= 2019–20 William & Mary Tribe men's basketball team =

American college basketball season

2019–20 William & Mary Tribe men's basketball
- Conference: Colonial Athletic Association
- Record: 21–11 (13–5 CAA)
- Head coach: Dane Fischer (1st season)
- Assistant coaches: Mike Howland; Jason Kemp; Julian Boatner
- Home arena: Kaplan Arena

2019–20 CAA men's basketball standings
	Conf.				Overall
Team	W		L	PCT	W		L	PCT
Hofstra†	14	–	4	.778	26	–	8	.765
William & Mary	13	–	5	.722	21	–	11	.656
Towson	12	–	6	.667	19	–	13	.594
Delaware	11	–	7	.611	22	–	11	.667
Charleston	11	–	7	.611	17	–	14	.548
Northeastern	9	–	9	.500	17	–	16	.515
Elon	7	–	11	.389	13	–	21	.382
Drexel	6	–	12	.333	14	–	19	.424
UNC Wilmington	5	–	13	.278	10	–	22	.313
James Madison	2	–	16	.111	9	–	21	.300
† 2020 CAA tournament winner

The 2019–20 William & Mary Tribe men's basketball team represented the College of William & Mary during the 2019–20 NCAA Division I men's basketball season. The Tribe, led by first-year head coach Dane Fischer, played their home games at Kaplan Arena in Williamsburg, Virginia as members of the Colonial Athletic Association.

== Previous season ==
The Tribe finished the 2018–19 season 14–17, 10–6 in CAA play to finish in fourth place. They lost in the quarterfinals of the CAA tournament to Delaware.

== Offseason ==
=== Departures ===
Name	Number	Pos.	Height	Weight	Year	Hometown	Reason for departure
Matt Milon	2	G	6'5"	195	RS junior	Oviedo, FL	Graduate transferred to UCF
L.J. Owens	11	G	6'3"	165	Freshman	Annapolis, MD	Transferred to UMBC
Chase Audige	15	G	6'4"	190	RS freshman	Coram, NY	Transferred to Northwestern
Paul Rowley	22	F	6'8"	205	RS senior	Purcellville, VA	Graduated
Justin Pierce	23	G/F	6'6"	215	Junior	Glen Ellyn, IL	Graduate transferred to North Carolina
Christian Clark	33	F	6'6"	205	Senior	Chester, VA	Walk-on; graduated

=== Incoming transfers ===
Name	Number	Pos.	Height	Weight	Year	Hometown	Previous school
Tyler Hamilton	2	G	6'4"	205	RS senior	Atlanta, GA	Transferred from Penn. Was eligible to play immediately, since he graduated from Penn.
Bryce Barnes	5	G	5'11"	172	Senior	Chicago, IL	Transferred from Milwaukee. Was eligible to play immediately, since he graduated from UW Milwaukee.

=== 2019 recruiting class ===
College recruiting
Name	Hometown	School	Height	Weight	Commit date
Miguel Ayesa; SG	Madrid, Spain	National Top Sports Institute	6 ft 5 in (1.96 m)	197 lb (89 kg)	May 16, 2019
Miguel Ayesa; SG	Recruit ratings: Scout: Rivals: (NR)				
Rainers Hermanovskis; SG	Smiltene, Latvia	BK Jēkabpils	6 ft 4 in (1.93 m)	194 lb (88 kg)	Jun 9, 2019
Rainers Hermanovskis; SG	Recruit ratings: Scout: Rivals: (NR)				
Thatcher Stone; SF	Medford, MA	Dexter Southfield School	6 ft 7 in (2.01 m)	180 lb (82 kg)	Jun 24, 2019
Thatcher Stone; SF	Recruit ratings: Scout: Rivals: (NR)				
Ben Wight; C	Worthington, OH	Thomas Worthington High School	6 ft 9 in (2.06 m)	200 lb (91 kg)	May 16, 2019
Ben Wight; C	Recruit ratings: Scout: Rivals: (NR)				
Overall recruit ranking: 247Sports: 287
Note: In many cases, Scout, Rivals, 247Sports, On3, and ESPN may conflict in their listings of height and weight.; In these cases, the average was taken. ESPN grades are on a 100-point scale.; Sources: "2019 Team Ranking". Rivals.

=== 2020 recruiting class ===
College recruiting (2020)
Name	Hometown	School	Height	Weight	Commit date
Connor Kochera; SF	Arlington Heights, IL	Saint Viator High School	6 ft 4 in (1.93 m)	N/A	Jul 3, 2019
Connor Kochera; SF	Recruit ratings: Scout: Rivals: (NR)				
Jake Milkereit; SG	Dallas, TX	Bishop Lynch High School	6 ft 3 in (1.91 m)	185 lb (84 kg)	Sep 25, 2019
Jake Milkereit; SG	Recruit ratings: Scout: Rivals: (NR)				
Overall recruit ranking:
Note: In many cases, Scout, Rivals, 247Sports, On3, and ESPN may conflict in their listings of height and weight.; In these cases, the average was taken. ESPN grades are on a 100-point scale.; Sources: "2020 Team Ranking". Rivals.

== Roster ==
2019–20 William & Mary Tribe men's basketball team
Players
Coaches

Pos.	#	Name	Height	Weight	Year	Previous school	Hometown
G	0	Jihar Williams	6 ft 5 in (1.96 m)	201 lb (91 kg)	Jr	Friends School of Baltimore	Baltimore, MD
G	1	Thornton Scott	6 ft 4 in (1.93 m)	177 lb (80 kg)	So	Holy Trinity HS	Glen Cove, NY
G	2	Tyler Hamilton	6 ft 4 in (1.93 m)	210 lb (95 kg)	RS Sr	Cheshire Academy; Penn	Atlanta, GA
G	4	Miodrag Dronjak (W)	6 ft 2 in (1.88 m)	185 lb (84 kg)	RS Jr	Virginia Beach Friends School; Richard Bland College	Kladovo, Serbia
G	5	Bryce Barnes	5 ft 11 in (1.8 m)	189 lb (86 kg)	Sr	Bogan HS; Milwaukee	Chicago, IL
G	10	Rainers Hermanovskis	6 ft 4 in (1.93 m)	204 lb (93 kg)	Fr		Smiltene, Latvia
F/C	11	Andy Van Vliet	7 ft 0 in (2.13 m)	231 lb (105 kg)	RS Sr	Antwerp Giants; Wisconsin	Antwerp, Belgium
G	12	Luke Loewe	6 ft 4 in (1.93 m)	188 lb (85 kg)	Jr	Fond du Lac HS	Fond du Lac, WI
C	13	Nathan Knight	6 ft 10 in (2.08 m)	253 lb (115 kg)	Sr	Nottingham HS/Kimball Union Academy	Syracuse, NY
G	15	Miguel Ayesa	6 ft 4 in (1.93 m)	195 lb (88 kg)	Fr	National Top Sports Institute	Madrid, Spain
F	21	Quinn Blair	6 ft 8 in (2.03 m)	218 lb (99 kg)	RS So	Divine Child HS	Livonia, MI
G/F	22	Thatcher Stone	6 ft 6 in (1.98 m)	190 lb (86 kg)	Fr	Dexter Southfield School	Medford, MA
G	24	Austin Washburn (W)	6 ft 3 in (1.91 m)	168 lb (76 kg)	So	Powhatan HS	Powhatan, VA
F/C	30	Mehkel Harvey	6 ft 9 in (2.06 m)	221 lb (100 kg)	RS So	Ocean View HS	Huntington Beach, CA
F	35	Ben Wight	6 ft 9 in (2.06 m)	200 lb (91 kg)	Fr	Thomas Worthington HS	Columbus, OH

Head coach

- Dane Fischer (Ithaca)

Assistant coach(es)

- Mike Howland (DePauw)
- Jason Kemp (UW–La Crosse)
- Julian Boatner (William & Mary)

Legend

- (C) Team captain
- (S) Suspended
- (I) Ineligible
- (W) Walk-on
- Injured
- Current redshirt

Roster

== Schedule and results ==
Date time, TV	Rank^{#}	Opponent^{#}	Result	Record	Site (attendance) city, state
Non-conference regular season
November 5, 2019*; 7:00 pm, ESPN+		at High Point	W 70–56	1–0	Millis Athletic Convocation Center (1,292); High Point, NC
November 8, 2019*; 7:00 pm		at American	W 79–70	2–0	Bender Arena (1,018); Washington, D.C.
November 12, 2019*; 7:00 pm, ESPN+		at Wofford; CBE Hall of Fame Classic campus-site game	W 80–79	3–0	Jerry Richardson Indoor Stadium (1,840); Spartanburg, SC
November 15, 2019*; 7:00 pm, Cox Yurview		Hampton	W 78–65	4–0	Kaplan Arena (3,735); Williamsburg, VA
November 18, 2019*; 7:00 pm, MASN2		at Oklahoma; CBE Hall of Fame Classic campus-site game	L 70–75	4–1	Lloyd Noble Center (6,393); Norman, OK
November 21, 2019*; 10:00 pm, P12N		at Stanford; CBE Hall of Fame Classic campus-site game	L 50–81	4–2	Maples Pavilion (2,502); Stanford, CA
November 26, 2019*; 7:30 pm, FloSports		Morehead State; CBE Hall of Fame Classic campus-site game	W 95–84	5–2	Kaplan Arena (2,882); Williamsburg, VA
November 30, 2019*; 2:00 pm, ESPN+		at Buffalo	L 77–88	5–3	Alumni Arena (3,420); Amherst, NY
December 3, 2019*; 7:00 pm, Cox Yurview		Old Dominion; Rivalry	W 63–46	6–3	Kaplan Arena (3,371); Williamsburg, VA
December 8, 2019*; 2:00 pm, ESPN+		at Fairfield	W 62–58	7–3	Alumni Hall (2,161); Fairfield, CT
December 15, 2019*; 12:00 pm, FloSports		Goucher	W 90–30	8–3	Kaplan Arena (2,554); Williamsburg, VA
December 19, 2019*; 7:00 pm, ESPN+		at Saint Joseph's	L 69–84	8–4	Hagan Arena (1,513); Philadelphia, PA
December 22, 2019*; 1:00 pm, FloSports		vs. Saint Francis (PA); D.C. Holiday Hoops fest Showcase	L 72–78	8–5	Entertainment and Sports Arena; Washington, D.C.
CAA regular season
December 30, 2019; 7:00 pm, CBSSN		at Elon	W 74–73	9–5 (1–0)	Schar Center (1,923); Elon, NC
January 2, 2020; 7:00 pm, FloSports		at Hofstra	W 88–61	10–5 (2–0)	Mack Sports Complex (1,725); Hempstead, NY
January 4, 2020; 4:00 pm, FloSports		at Northeastern	W 66–64	11–5 (3–0)	Matthews Arena (901); Boston, MA
January 9, 2020; 7:00 pm, FloSports		UNC Wilmington	W 79–63	12–5 (4–0)	Kaplan Arena (3,328); Williamsburg, VA
January 11, 2020; 2:00 pm, FloSports		College of Charleston	W 67–56	13–5 (5–0)	Kaplan Arena (4,384); Williamsburg, VA
January 16, 2020; 7:00 pm, FloSports		at Delaware	W 77–68	14–5 (6–0)	Bob Carpenter Center (1,955); Newark, DE
January 18, 2020; 2:00 pm, FloSports		at Drexel	L 57–84	14–6 (6–1)	Daskalakis Athletic Center (1,587); Philadelphia, PA
January 23, 2020; 7:00 pm, FloSports		James Madison	W 88–75	15–6 (7–1)	Kaplan Arena (4,429); Williamsburg, VA
January 25, 2020; 4:00 pm, FloSports		Towson	L 58–70	15–7 (7–2)	Kaplan Arena (4,848); Williamsburg, VA
January 30, 2020; 7:00 pm, FloSports		at Northeastern	W 59–58	16–7 (8–2)	Kaplan Arena (3,405); Williamsburg, VA
February 1, 2020; 4:00 pm, FloSports		Hofstra	L 60–83	16–8 (8–3)	Kaplan Arena (5,325); Williamsburg, VA
February 6, 2020; 7:00 pm, FloSports		at College of Charleston	L 50–68	16–9 (8–4)	TD Arena (4,186); Charleston, SC
February 8, 2020; 7:00 pm, FloSports		at UNC Wilmington	L 64–70	16–10 (8–5)	Trask Coliseum (4,155); Wilmington, NC
February 13, 2020; 7:00 pm, FloSports		Drexel	W 77–72	17–10 (9–5)	Kaplan Arena (3,590); Williamsburg, VA
February 15, 2020; 4:00 pm, Cox Yurview		Delaware	W 81–77	18–10 (10–5)	Kaplan Arena (5,090); Williamsburg, VA
February 20, 2020; 7:00 pm, FloSports		at Towson	W 61–51	19–10 (11–5)	SECU Arena (2,613); Towson, MD
February 22, 2020; 4:00 pm, FloSports		at James Madison	W 78–74	20–10 (12–5)	JMU Convocation Center (3,125); Harrisonburg, VA
February 29, 2020; 4:00 pm, Cox Yurview		Elon	W 86–79	21–10 (13–5)	Kaplan Arena (5,180); Williamsburg, VA
CAA Tournament
March 8, 2020; 6:00 pm, FloHoops	(2)	vs. (7) Elon; Quarterfinals	L 63–68	21–11	Entertainment and Sports Arena; Washington, D.C.
*Non-conference game. ^{#}Rankings from AP Poll. (#) Tournament seedings in parentheses. All times are in Eastern Time.
