= 2019–20 Colonial Athletic Association men's basketball season =

- League: NCAA Division I
- Sport: Basketball
- Duration: November, 2019 – March, 2020
- Teams: 10

Regular Season
- Champions: Hofstra
- Runners-up: William & Mary
- Season MVP: Nathan Knight (William & Mary)
- Top scorer: Jordan Roland (Northeastern)

Tournament
- Champions: Hofstra
- Runners-up: Northeastern
- Finals MVP: Desure Buie (Hofstra)

CAA men's basketball seasons
- ← 2018–19 2020–21 →

2019–20 CAA men's basketball standings
	Conf.				Overall
Team	W		L	PCT	W		L	PCT
Hofstra†	14	–	4	.778	26	–	8	.765
William & Mary	13	–	5	.722	21	–	11	.656
Towson	12	–	6	.667	19	–	13	.594
Delaware	11	–	7	.611	22	–	11	.667
Charleston	11	–	7	.611	17	–	14	.548
Northeastern	9	–	9	.500	17	–	16	.515
Elon	7	–	11	.389	13	–	21	.382
Drexel	6	–	12	.333	14	–	19	.424
UNC Wilmington	5	–	13	.278	10	–	22	.313
James Madison	2	–	16	.111	9	–	21	.300
† 2020 CAA tournament winner

The 2019–20 CAA men's basketball season will mark the 35th season of Colonial Athletic Association basketball, taking place between November 2019 and March 2020. Practices will commence in October 2019, and the season will end with the 2020 CAA men's basketball tournament.

== Head coaches ==
=== Coaching changes ===
- On March 13, 2019, William & Mary announced that head coach Tony Shaver would not be retained for the following season. On April 2, 2019, William & Mary announced that Dane Fischer was hired to replace Tony Shaver as head coach.
- Elon fired head coach Matt Matheny on March 18, 2019, following two consecutive losing seasons. On April 5, 2019, Elon announced the hiring of Mike Schrage as head men's basketball coach.

=== Coaches ===
Team	Head coach	Previous job	Year at school	Overall record	CAA record	CAA championships	NCAA Tournaments
College of Charleston	Earl Grant	Clemson (asst.)	6	101–65	51–39	1	1
Delaware	Martin Ingelsby	Notre Dame (asst.)	4	44–55	19–35	0	0
Drexel	Zach Spiker	Army	4	35–62	16–38	0	0
Elon	Mike Schrage	Ohio State (asst.)	1	0–0	0–0	0	0
Hofstra	Joe Mihalich	Niagara	7	115–84	63–43	0	0
James Madison	Louis Rowe	Bowling Green (asst.)	4	34–64	19–35	0	0
Northeastern	Bill Coen	Boston College (asst.)	14	224–197	137–95	2	2
Towson	Pat Skerry	Pittsburgh (asst.)	9	124–137	68–74	0	0
UNC Wilmington	C.B. McGrath	North Carolina (asst.)	3	21–44	12–24	0	0
William & Mary	Dane Fischer	George Mason (asst.)	1	0–0	0–0	0	0

Notes:

- All records, appearances, titles, etc. are from time with current school only.
- Year at school includes 2019–20 season.
- Overall and CAA records are from time at current school and are through the end of the 2018–19 season.

== Preseason ==
=== Preseason poll ===
Rank	Team	Points
1	Hofstra (14)	331
2	College of Charleston (18)	323
3	Northeastern (4)	291
4	James Madison (3)	253
5	Delaware (2)	241
6	Towson	194
7	William & Mary	131
8	Drexel	125
9	UNC Wilmington	118
10	Elon	48

() first place votes

=== Preseason All-Conference Teams ===
Award	Recipients
First Team	Brian Fobbs (Towson); Nathan Knight (William & Mary); Matt Lewis (James Madison); Eli Pemberton (Hofstra); Grant Riller (Charleston)
Second Team	Ryan Allen (Delaware); Darius Banks (James Madison); Desure Buie (Hofstra); Jordan Roland (Northeastern); Camren Wynter (Drexel)
Honorable Mention	Bolden Brace (Northeastern); Kai Toews (UNCW); Kevin Anderson (Delaware); Marcus Sheffield II (Elon); James Butler (Drexel)

Colonial Athletic Association Preseason Player of the Year: Grant Riller (Charleston)

== Regular season ==
=== Rankings ===
Legend
Increase in ranking
Decrease in ranking
Not ranked previous week

		Pre	Wk 2	Wk 3	Wk 4	Wk 5	Wk 6	Wk 7	Wk 8	Wk 9	Wk 10	Wk 11	Wk 12	Wk 13	Wk 14	Wk 15	Wk 16	Wk 17	Wk 18	Wk 19	Final
College of Charleston	AP																				
College of Charleston	C																				
Delaware	AP					RV															
Delaware	C																				
Drexel	AP																				
Drexel	C																				
Elon	AP																				
Elon	C																				
Hofstra	AP																				
Hofstra	C																				
James Madison	AP																				
James Madison	C																				
Northeastern	AP																				
Northeastern	C																				
Towson	AP																				
Towson	C																				
UNC Wilmington	AP																				
UNC Wilmington	C																				
William & Mary	AP																				
William & Mary	C																				

=== Conference matrix ===
This table summarizes the head-to-head results between teams in conference play.

	Charleston	Delaware	Drexel	Elon	Hofstra	James Madison	Northeastern	Towson	UNC Wilmington	William & Mary
vs. Charleston	–	0–1	0–1	1–1	1–1	0–2	2–0	0–2	1–0	1–1
vs. Delaware	1–0	–	1–1	0–2	0–1	0–2	0–1	1–1	0–1	2–0
vs. Drexel	1–0	1–1	–	1–1	1–0	0–2	1–0	2–0	0–1	1–1
vs. Elon	1–1	2–0	1–1	–	2–0	0–1	1–1	1–0	0–2	1–0
vs. Hofstra	1–1	1–0	0–1	0–2	–	0–1	0–2	0–1	0–2	1–1
vs. James Madison	2–0	2–0	2–0	1–0	1–0	–	1–0	2–0	0–2	1–0
vs. Northeastern	0–2	1–0	0–1	1–1	2–0	0–1	–	0–1	1–1	2–0
vs. Towson	2–0	1–1	0–2	0–1	1–0	0–2	1–0	–	0–2	0–1
vs. UNC Wilmington	0–1	1–0	1–0	2–0	2–0	2–0	1–1	2–0	–	1–1
vs. William & Mary	1–1	0–2	1–1	0–1	1–1	0–1	0–2	1–0	1–1	–
Total	9–6	9–5	6–8	6–9	11–3	2–12	7–7	9–5	3–12	10–5

== Postseason ==
=== Colonial Athletic Association tournament ===
- March 7–10, 2020: Colonial Athletic Association Men's Basketball Tournament, St. Elizabeths East Entertainment and Sports Arena, Washington, D.C.

=== NCAA tournament ===
The CAA had one confirmed bid to the 2020 NCAA Division I men's basketball tournament, that being the automatic bid of Hofstra by winning the conference tournament. The tournament was cancelled before any other at-large bids were awarded.

=== National Invitation tournament ===
The 2020 National Invitation Tournament was canceled due to the COVID-19 pandemic.

=== College Basketball Invitational ===
The 2020 College Basketball Invitational was canceled due to the COVID-19 pandemic.

=== CollegeInsider.com Postseason tournament ===
The 2020 CollegeInsider.com Postseason Tournament was canceled due to the COVID-19 pandemic.

== Awards and honors ==
=== Regular season ===
==== CAA Player-of-the-Week ====
- Nov. 11 – Jordan Roland (Northeastern)
- Nov. 18 – Andy Van Vliet (William & Mary)
- Nov. 25 – Desure Buie (Hofstra)
- Dec. 2 – Nathan Knight (William & Mary), Justyn Mutts (Delaware)
- Dec. 9 – Nathan Knight (William & Mary)(2)
- Dec. 16 – Nate Darling (Delaware), Brian Fobbs (Towson)
- Dec. 23 – Eli Pemberton (Hofstra)
- Dec. 31 – Desure Buie (Hofstra)(2)
- Jan. 6 – Nathan Knight (William & Mary)(3), Grant Riller (Charleston)
- Jan. 13 – Allen Betrand (Towson)
- Jan. 20 – Camren Wynter (Drexel)
- Jan. 27 – Nate Darling (Delaware)(2)
- Feb. 3 – Desure Buie (Hofstra)(3), Grant Riller (Charleston)(2)
- Feb. 10 – Nate Darling (Delaware)(3), Marcus Sheffield II (Elon)
- Feb. 17 – Nathan Knight (William & Mary)(4)
- Feb. 24 – Desure Buie (Hofstra)(4)
- Mar. 3 – Brian Fobbs (Towson)(2)

==== CAA Rookie-of-the-Week ====
- Nov. 11 – Tyson Walker (Northeastern)
- Nov. 18 – Julien Wooden (James Madison)
- Nov. 25 – Tyson Walker (Northeastern)(2)
- Dec. 2 – Michael Christmas (James Madison)
- Dec. 9 – Hunter Woods (Elon)
- Dec. 16 – Hunter McIntosh (Elon)
- Dec. 23 – Shykeim Phillips (UNCW)
- Dec. 31 – Tyson Walker (Northeastern)(3)
- Jan. 6 – Tyson Walker (Northeastern)(4)
- Jan. 13 – Zac Ervin (Elon)
- Jan. 20 – Shykeim Phillips (UNCW)(2)
- Jan. 27 – Jason Gibson (Towson)
- Feb. 3 – Hunter McIntosh (Elon)(2)
- Feb. 10 – Imajae Dodd (UNCW)
- Feb. 17 – Hunter McIntosh (Elon)(3)
- Feb. 24 – Hunter McIntosh (Elon)(4)
- Mar. 3 – Shykeim Phillips (UNCW)(3)

=== Postseason ===
==== CAA All-Conference Teams and Awards ====
Award	Recipients
Player of the Year	Nathan Knight (William & Mary)
Coach of the Year	Dane Fischer (William & Mary)
Rookie of the Year	Hunter McIntosh (Elon)
Defensive Player of the Year	Nathan Knight (William & Mary)
Sixth Man of the Year	Nicolas Timberlake (Towson)
Dean Ehlers Leadership Award	Desure Buie (Hofstra)
Scholar-Athlete of the Year	Tareq Coburn (Hofstra)
First Team	Desure Buie (Hofstra); Nate Darling (Delaware); Nathan Knight (William & Mary); Grant Riller (Charleston); Jordan Roland (Northeastern)
Second Team	Brian Fobbs (Towson); Matt Lewis (James Madison); Eli Pemberton (Hofstra); Marcus Sheffield (Elon); Camren Wynter (Drexel)
Third Team	Kevin Anderson (Delaware); Allen Bertrand (Towson); James Butler (Drexel); Isaac Kante (Hofstra); Andy Van Vliet (William & Mary)
All-Defensive Team	Desure Buie (Hofstra); Brevin Galloway (Charleston); Nathan Knight (William & Mary); Luke Loewe (William & Mary); Dennis Tunstall (Towson)
All-Rookie Team	Jason Gibson (Towson); Hunter McIntosh (Elon); Shykeim Phillips (UNCW); Tyson Walker (Northeastern); Hunter Woods (Elon)

== Attendance ==
Team	Arena	Capacity	Game 1	Game 2	Game 3	Game 4	Game 5	Game 6	Game 7	Game 8	Total	Average	% of Capacity
Team	Arena	Capacity	Game 9	Game 10	Game 11	Game 12	Game 13	Game 14	Game 15	Game 16	Total	Average	% of Capacity
Charleston	TD Arena	5,100	4,014	3,853	5,005	3,726	3,938	3,651	3,350	4,224	63,435	4,229	83%
Charleston	TD Arena	5,100	4,340	4,301	4,905	4,186	5,108	3,762	5,072		63,435	4,229	83%
Delaware	Bob Carpenter Center	5,100											0%
Drexel	Daskalakis Athletic Center	2,509	1,129	795	882	1,201	1,233	1,066	830	926	15,883	1,059	42%
Drexel	Daskalakis Athletic Center	2,509	1,109	1,007	1,147	950	1,162	852	1,594		15,883	1,059	42%
Elon	Schar Center	5,100											0%
Hofstra	Mack Sports Complex	5,023	4,223	3,897	2,072	3,111	2,257	1,725	1,809	2,291	39,718	2,837	56%
Hofstra	Mack Sports Complex	5,023	2,453	3,835	2,502	2,506	3,194	3,843			39,718	2,837	56%
James Madison	JMU Convocation Center	6,426											0%
Northeastern	Matthews Arena	6,000											0%
Towson	SECU Arena	5,200											0%
UNC Wilmington	Trask Coliseum	5,200											0%
William & Mary	Kaplan Arena	8,600	3,735	2,882	3,371	2,554	3,328	4,384	4,429	4,848	52,121	4,009	47%
William & Mary	Kaplan Arena	8,600	3,405	5,325	3,590	5,090	5,180				52,121	4,009	47%
