= 2019–20 Hofstra Pride men's basketball team =

American college basketball season

2019–20 Hofstra Pride men's basketball

CAA regular-season and tournament champions
- Conference: Colonial Athletic Association
- Record: 26–8 (14–4 CAA)
- Head coach: Joe Mihalich (7th season)
- Assistant coaches: Mike Farrelly; Speedy Claxton; Colin Curtin
- Home arena: Mack Sports Complex

2019–20 CAA men's basketball standings
	Conf.				Overall
Team	W		L	PCT	W		L	PCT
Hofstra†	14	–	4	.778	26	–	8	.765
William & Mary	13	–	5	.722	21	–	11	.656
Towson	12	–	6	.667	19	–	13	.594
Delaware	11	–	7	.611	22	–	11	.667
Charleston	11	–	7	.611	17	–	14	.548
Northeastern	9	–	9	.500	17	–	16	.515
Elon	7	–	11	.389	13	–	21	.382
Drexel	6	–	12	.333	14	–	19	.424
UNC Wilmington	5	–	13	.278	10	–	22	.313
James Madison	2	–	16	.111	9	–	21	.300
† 2020 CAA tournament winner

The 2019–20 Hofstra Pride men's basketball team represented Hofstra University during the 2019–20 NCAA Division I men's basketball season. The Pride, led by seventh-year head coach Joe Mihalich, played their home games at Mack Sports Complex in Hempstead, New York as members of the Colonial Athletic Association (CAA), and won the regular season championship for the second year in a row.

After beating Northeastern 70–61 in the CAA championship game, the Pride won the CAA's automatic bid to the 2020 NCAA Division I men's basketball tournament. However, they would not ultimately appear, as the tournament was canceled due to the COVID-19 pandemic.

== Previous season ==
The Pride finished the 2018–19 season 27–8, 15–3 in CAA play, to claim the regular season CAA championship. They advanced to the championship game of the CAA tournament where they lost to Northeastern. As a regular-season champion who failed to win their league tournament, they received an automatic bid to the National Invitation Tournament where they lost in the first round to NC State.

== Offseason ==
=== Departures ===
Name	Number	Pos.	Height	Weight	Year	Hometown	Reason for departure
Matija Radović	1	F	6'7"	205	Sophomore	Belgrade, Serbia	Transferred to American International
Kenny Wormley	2	G	6'4"	180	Senior	Landover, MD	Graduated
Justin Wright-Foreman	3	G	6'2"	190	Senior	Queens, NY	Graduated/2019 NBA draft
Jacquil Taylor	23	F	6'10"	240	RS Senior	Cambridge, MA	Graduated
Dan Dwyer	30	F	6'8"	215	RS Senior	River Forest, IL	Graduated

=== Incoming transfers ===
Name	Number	Pos.	Height	Weight	Year	Hometown	Previous school
Omar Silverio	2	G	6'4"	190	Sophomore	The Bronx, NY	Transferred from Rhode Island. Silverio was granted a waiver for immediate eligibility and will have three years of remaining eligibility.

=== 2019 recruiting class ===
College recruiting information
Name	Hometown	School	Height	Weight	Commit date
Caleb Burgess; PG	Kernersville, NC	Moravian Preparatory School	6 ft 3 in (1.91 m)	170 lb (77 kg)	Dec 16, 2018
Caleb Burgess; PG	Recruit ratings: Scout: Rivals: (NR)				
Jermaine Miranda; SG	Juncos, Puerto Rico	NBA Global Academy	6 ft 4 in (1.93 m)	185 lb (84 kg)	May 27, 2019
Jermaine Miranda; SG	Recruit ratings: Scout: Rivals: (NR)				
Kvonn Cramer; SF	Wilmington, DE	Mount Pleasant High School	6 ft 7 in (2.01 m)	165 lb (75 kg)	Nov 15, 2018
Kvonn Cramer; SF	Recruit ratings: Scout: Rivals: 247Sports: (NR)				
Overall recruit ranking:
Note: In many cases, Scout, Rivals, 247Sports, On3, and ESPN may conflict in their listings of height and weight.; In these cases, the average was taken. ESPN grades are on a 100-point scale.; Sources: "2019 Team Ranking". Rivals.

=== 2020 recruiting class ===
College recruiting information (2020)
Name	Hometown	School	Height	Weight	Commit date
Zion Bethea; SG	Wayne, NJ	DePaul Catholic High School	6 ft 1 in (1.85 m)	N/A	Sep 10, 2019
Zion Bethea; SG	Recruit ratings: Scout: Rivals: (77)				
David Green; SF	Ocoee, FL	Ocoee High School	6 ft 7 in (2.01 m)	215 lb (98 kg)	Jun 28, 2019
David Green; SF	Recruit ratings: Scout: Rivals: (77)				
Overall recruit ranking:
Note: In many cases, Scout, Rivals, 247Sports, On3, and ESPN may conflict in their listings of height and weight.; In these cases, the average was taken. ESPN grades are on a 100-point scale.; Sources: "2020 Team Ranking". Rivals.

== Roster ==
2019–20 Hofstra Pride men's basketball team
Players
Coaches

Pos.	#	Name	Height	Weight	Year	Previous school	Hometown
G	0	Tareq Coburn	6 ft 5 in (1.96 m)	205 lb (93 kg)	RS Jr	St. Bonaventure	Rosedale, NY
G	1	Caleb Burgess	6 ft 3 in (1.91 m)	170 lb (77 kg)	Fr	Moravian Prep	Winston-Salem, NC
G	2	Omar Silverio	6 ft 3 in (1.91 m)	200 lb (91 kg)	So	Rhode Island	The Bronx, NY
G	3	Jermaine Miranda	6 ft 4 in (1.93 m)	190 lb (86 kg)	Fr	NBA Academy Latin America	Juncos, Puerto Rico
G	4	Desure Buie	5 ft 11 in (1.8 m)	160 lb (73 kg)	RS Sr	Wings Academy	The Bronx, NY
G	5	Eli Pemberton	6 ft 5 in (1.96 m)	195 lb (88 kg)	Sr	Cheshire Academy	Middletown, CT
F/C	11	Hal Hughes	6 ft 9 in (2.06 m)	220 lb (100 kg)	RS Fr	Sydney Grammar	Sydney, Australia
G	12	Carl Gibson Jr. (W)	6 ft 2 in (1.88 m)	170 lb (77 kg)	Fr	Cherry Hill East	Cherry Hill, NJ
F/C	14	Kevin Schutte	6 ft 9 in (2.06 m)	235 lb (107 kg)	Jr	CSE Zwolle	Zwolle, the Netherlands
F	15	Stafford Trueheart	6 ft 8 in (2.03 m)	205 lb (93 kg)	RS Jr	Canisius High School	Lancaster, NY
G	20	Jalen Ray	6 ft 2 in (1.88 m)	175 lb (79 kg)	Jr	Hampton	Hampton, VA
F	23	Kvonn Cramer	6 ft 6 in (1.98 m)	205 lb (93 kg)	Fr	Mount Pleasant	Wilmington, DE
G	24	Connor Klementowicz	6 ft 2 in (1.88 m)	210 lb (95 kg)	Sr	Gill St. Bernard's School	Freehold, NJ
F/C	32	Isaac Kante	6 ft 7 in (2.01 m)	240 lb (109 kg)	RS So	Georgia	Brooklyn, NY

Head coach

- Joe Mihalich (La Salle)

Assistant coach(es)

- Mike Farrelly (Saint Joseph's)
- Speedy Claxton (Hofstra)
- Colin Curtin (Niagara)

Legend

- (C) Team captain
- (S) Suspended
- (I) Ineligible
- (W) Walk-on
- Injured
- Current redshirt

Roster
Last update: May 23, 2024

== Schedule and results ==
Date time, TV	Rank^{#}	Opponent^{#}	Result	Record	Site (attendance) city, state
Non-conference regular season
November 6, 2019*; 7:00 pm, FloSports		San Jose State	L 71–79	0–1	Mack Sports Complex (4,223); Hempstead, NY
November 9, 2019*; 4:00 pm, FloSports		Monmouth	W 94–74	1–1	Mack Sports Complex (3,897); Hempstead, NY
November 13, 2019*; 7:00 pm		at Bucknell	L 71–86	1–2	Sojka Pavilion (1,952); Lewisburg, PA
November 15, 2019*; 5:00 pm, FloSports		NY Tech	W 111–69	2–2	Mack Sports Complex (2,072); Hempstead, NY
November 21, 2019*; 11:00 pm, P12N		at UCLA	W 88–78	3–2	Pauley Pavilion (4,836); Los Angeles, CA
November 24, 2019*; 8:00 pm		at Cal State Fullerton	W 79–57	4–2	Titan Gym (588); Fullerton, CA
November 27, 2019*; 10:00 pm		at San Diego; Boca Raton Classic non-bracket game	L 69–79	4–3	Jenny Craig Pavilion (907); San Diego, CA
December 1, 2019*; 3:00 pm		vs. Holy Cross; Boca Raton Beach Classic Naismith semifinals	W 91–69	5–3	FAU Arena; Boca Raton, FL
December 2, 2019*; 2:00 pm		vs. Canisius; Boca Raton Beach Classic Naismith championship	W 64–57	6–3	FAU Arena; Boca Raton, FL
December 7, 2019*; 2:30 pm, ESPN+		at St. Bonaventure	L 45–73	6–4	Reilly Center (5,480); Olean, NY
December 10, 2019*; 7:00 pm, FloSports		Stony Brook	W 71–63	7–4	Mack Sports Complex (3,111); Hempstead, NY
December 19, 2019*; 7:00 pm, ESPN+		at Princeton	W 87–72	8–4	Jadwin Gymnasium (1,196); Princeton, NJ
December 22, 2019*; 12:00 pm, FloSports		Manhattan	W 63–51	9–4	Mack Sports Complex (2,257); Hempstead, NY
CAA regular season
December 28, 2019; 4:00 pm, FloSports		at James Madison	W 82–76	10–4 (1–0)	JMU Convocation Center (1,987); Harrisonburg, VA
December 30, 2019; 2:00 pm, FloSports		at Towson	W 75–67	11–4 (2–0)	SECU Arena (1,225); Towson, MD
January 2, 2020; 7:00 pm, FloSports		William & Mary	L 61–88	11–5 (2–1)	Mack Sports Complex (1,725); Hempstead, NY
January 4, 2020; 4:00 pm, FloSports		Elon	W 102–75	12–5 (3–1)	Mack Sports Complex (1,809); Hempstead, NY
January 9, 2020; 8:00 pm, CBSSN		at Northeastern	W 74–72	13–5 (4–1)	Matthews Arena (1,202); Boston, MA
January 16, 2020; 7:00 pm, FloSports		at UNC Wilmington	W 63–61	14–5 (5–1)	Trask Coliseum (2,816); Wilmington, NC
January 18, 2020; 4:00 pm, FloSports		at College of Charleston	L 67–69	14–6 (5–2)	TD Arena (4,301); Charleston, SC
January 23, 2020; 6:30 pm, CBSSN		Delaware	L 71–73	14–7 (5–3)	Mack Sports Complex (2,291); Hempstead, NY
January 25, 2020; 4:00 pm, FloSports		Drexel	W 72–59	15–7 (6–3)	Mack Sports Complex (2,453); Hempstead, NY
January 30, 2020; 7:00 pm, FloSports		at Elon	W 86–63	16–7 (7–3)	Schar Center (1,676); Elon, NC
February 1, 2020; 4:00 pm, FloSports		at William & Mary	W 83–60	17–7 (8–3)	Kaplan Arena (5,325); Williamsburg, VA
February 8, 2020; 4:00 pm, FloSports		Northeastern	W 75–71	18–7 (9–3)	Mack Sports Complex (3,835); Hempstead, NY
February 13, 2020; 7:00 pm, CBSSN		College of Charleston	W 76–63	19–7 (10–3)	Mack Sports Complex (2,502); Hempstead, NY
February 15, 2020; 4:00 pm, FloSports		UNC Wilmington	W 78–64	20–7 (11–3)	Mack Sports Complex (2,506); Hempstead, NY
February 20, 2020; 7:00 pm, FloSports		at Drexel	W 81–74	21–7 (12–3)	Daskalakis Athletic Center (852); Philadelphia, PA
February 22, 2020; 4:00 pm, FloSports		at Delaware	W 78–62	22–7 (13–3)	Bob Carpenter Center (4,722); Newark, DE
February 27, 2020; 7:00 pm, FloSports		Towson	L 65–76	22–8 (13–4)	Mack Sports Complex (3,194); Hempstead, NY
February 29, 2020; 4:00 pm, FloSports		James Madison	W 97–81	23–8 (14–4)	Mack Sports Complex (3,843); Hempstead, NY
CAA tournament
March 8, 2020; 12:00 pm, FloHoops	(1)	vs. (8) Drexel; Quarterfinals	W 61–43	24–8	Entertainment and Sports Arena; Washington, D.C.
March 9, 2020; 6:00 pm, CBSSN	(1)	vs. (5) Delaware; Semifinals	W 75–61	25–8	Entertainment and Sports Arena; Washington, D.C.
March 10, 2020; 7:00 pm, CBSSN	(1)	vs. (6) Northeastern; Championship	W 70–61	26–8	Entertainment and Sports Arena; Washington, D.C.
*Non-conference game. ^{#}Rankings from AP poll. (#) Tournament seedings in parentheses. All times are in Eastern Time.
