= 2019–20 Drexel Dragons men's basketball team =

American college basketball season

2019–20 Drexel Dragons men's basketball

Boardwalk Battle champions
- Conference: Colonial Athletic Association
- Record: 14–19 (6–12 CAA)
- Head coach: Zach Spiker (4th season)
- Assistant coaches: Paul Fortier (4th season); Justin Jennings (4th season); Rob O'Driscoll (4th season)
- MVP: Camren Wynter
- Captains: James Butler; Camren Wynter
- Home arena: Daskalakis Athletic Center

2019–20 CAA men's basketball standings
	Conf.				Overall
Team	W		L	PCT	W		L	PCT
Hofstra†	14	–	4	.778	26	–	8	.765
William & Mary	13	–	5	.722	21	–	11	.656
Towson	12	–	6	.667	19	–	13	.594
Delaware	11	–	7	.611	22	–	11	.667
Charleston	11	–	7	.611	17	–	14	.548
Northeastern	9	–	9	.500	17	–	16	.515
Elon	7	–	11	.389	13	–	21	.382
Drexel	6	–	12	.333	14	–	19	.424
UNC Wilmington	5	–	13	.278	10	–	22	.313
James Madison	2	–	16	.111	9	–	21	.300
† 2020 CAA tournament winner

The 2019–20 Drexel Dragons men's basketball team represented Drexel University during the 2019–20 NCAA Division I men's basketball season. The Dragons, led by fourth-year head coach Zach Spiker, played their home games at the Daskalakis Athletic Center in Philadelphia, Pennsylvania as members of the Colonial Athletic Association (CAA). They finished the season 14–19, 6–12 in CAA play, to finish in eighth place.

== Previous season ==
The Dragons finished the 2018–19 season 13–19, 7–11 in CAA play, to finish in a tie for sixth place. They lost to Charleston in the CAA tournament.

== Offseason ==
=== Departures ===
Name	Number	Pos.	Height	Weight	Year	Hometown	Notes
Troy Harper	3	G	6' 1"	175	RS Senior	Philadelphia, PA	Graduated
Jesse Reid	12	G	6' 2"	175	Sophomore	Bloomfield, NJ	Left team
Trevor John	23	G	6' 3"	190	RS Senior	Danville, CA	Graduated; Signed to ABC Athletic Constanța
Kevin Doi	24	F	5' 9"	165	RS Senior	Rolling Hills Estates, CA	Graduated
Alihan Demir	30	F	6' 9"	223	RS Junior	Ankara, Turkey	Transferred to Minnesota

=== 2019 recruiting class ===
College recruiting information
Name	Hometown	School	Height	Weight	Commit date
T.J. Bickerstaff; SF	Tyrone, GA	Sandy Creek High School	6 ft 8 in (2.03 m)	196 lb (89 kg)	Oct 19, 2018
T.J. Bickerstaff; SF	Recruit ratings: Rivals: 247Sports:				
Mate Okros; SG	Preston, England	Myerscough College	6 ft 5 in (1.96 m)	175 lb (79 kg)	Nov 15, 2018
Mate Okros; SG	Recruit ratings: 247Sports:				
Overall recruit ranking:
Note: In many cases, Scout, Rivals, 247Sports, On3, and ESPN may conflict in their listings of height and weight.; In these cases, the average was taken. ESPN grades are on a 100-point scale.; Sources: "Drexel 2019 Basketball Commitments". Rivals.; "Drexel Dragons". ESPN.; "2019 Team Ranking". Rivals.

=== Class of 2020 early commitments ===
College recruiting information (2020)
Name	Hometown	School	Height	Weight	Commit date
Lamar Oden Jr; SF	Atlanta, GA	Greenforest McCalep	6 ft 6 in (1.98 m)	180 lb (82 kg)	Sep 10, 2019
Lamar Oden Jr; SF	Recruit ratings: No ratings found				
Xavier Bell; SG	Andover, KS	Andover Central High School	6 ft 4 in (1.93 m)	175 lb (79 kg)	Jan 25, 2020
Xavier Bell; SG	Recruit ratings: No ratings found				
Amari Williams; C	Nottingham, England	Myerscough College	6 ft 11 in (2.11 m)	223 lb (101 kg)	Feb 5, 2020
Amari Williams; C	Recruit ratings: No ratings found				
Overall recruit ranking:
Note: In many cases, Scout, Rivals, 247Sports, On3, and ESPN may conflict in their listings of height and weight.; In these cases, the average was taken. ESPN grades are on a 100-point scale.; Sources: "Drexel 2020 Basketball Commitments". Rivals.; "Drexel Dragons". ESPN.; "2020 Team Ranking". Rivals.

== Preseason ==
In a poll of the league coaches, media relations directors, and media members at the CAA's media day, Drexel was picked to finish in eighth place in the CAA. Sophomore guard Camren Wynter was named as an honorable mention to the preseason All-Conference second team.

== Roster ==
2019–20 Drexel Dragons men's basketball team
Players
Coaches

Pos.	#	Name	Height	Weight	Year	Previous school	Hometown
G	0	Coletrane Washington	6 ft 4 in (1.93 m)	170 lb (77 kg)	So	Quaker Valley HS	Sewickley, PA
G	1	Kurk Jr. Lee	5 ft 9 in (1.75 m)	150 lb (68 kg)	Sr	St. Frances (MD)	Baltimore, MD
F	2	Jarvis Doles	6 ft 9 in (2.06 m)	215 lb (98 kg)	Jr	Hammond HS (MD)/Mt. Zion Prep (MD)	Baltimore, MD
F	4	Sam Green	6 ft 6 in (1.98 m)	230 lb (104 kg)	RS Jr	Bishop McNamara HS	Bowie, MD
F	5	Zach Walton	6 ft 6 in (1.98 m)	205 lb (93 kg)	RS Sr	Morton HS (WA)/Edmonds CC	Morton, WA
G	11	Camren Wynter (C)	6 ft 2 in (1.88 m)	175 lb (79 kg)	So	Holy Trinity HS/DME Academy	Hempstead, NY
F	13	Tim Jr. Perry	6 ft 10 in (2.08 m)	230 lb (104 kg)	RS So	Cherry Hill HS East/The Phelps School	Cherry Hill, NJ
G	15	Matej Juric	5 ft 11 in (1.8 m)	193 lb (88 kg)	So	Lake Forest Academy/Oakwood	Toronto, ON
G	20	Julian Adams (W)	6 ft 1 in (1.85 m)	175 lb (79 kg)	Sr	Dallastown Area HS	York, PA
F	21	Mate Okros	6 ft 6 in (1.98 m)	193 lb (88 kg)	Fr	Myerscough College	Debrecen, Hungary
F	23	T.J. Bickerstaff	6 ft 9 in (2.06 m)	207 lb (94 kg)	Fr	Sandy Creek HS	Atlanta, GA
C	32	Tadas Kararinas	6 ft 10 in (2.08 m)	210 lb (95 kg)	Jr	Findlay Prep	Šilutė, Lithuania
F	51	James Butler (C)	6 ft 8 in (2.03 m)	242 lb (110 kg)	RS Jr	Lake Braddock/Navy	Fairfax Station, VA

Head coach

- Zach Spiker (Ithaca)

Assistant coach(es)

- Paul Fortier (Washington)
- Justin Jennings (Penn State Behrend)
- Rob O'Driscoll (Villanova)

Legend

- (C) Team captain
- (S) Suspended
- (I) Ineligible
- (W) Walk-on
- Injured
- Current redshirt

Roster
Last update: July 2, 2019

- Senior guard Kurk Lee Jr. left the team for personal reasons on 13 November 2019.

== Schedule and results ==
Date time, TV	Rank^{#}	Opponent^{#}	Result	Record	High points	High rebounds	High assists	Site (attendance) city, state
Non-conference regular season
November 5, 2019*; 8:00 p.m., ESPN3		at Temple; City 6	L 62–70	0–1	16 – Bickerstaff	15 – Butler	6 – Wynter	Liacouras Center (7,025); Philadelphia, PA
November 8, 2019*; 7:00 p.m., FloSports		Niagara; Garden State Showcase	W 72–64	1–1	22 – Butler	15 – Butler	9 – Wynter	Daskalakis Athletic Center (1,129); Philadelphia, PA
November 10, 2019*; 2:00 p.m., FloSports		Abilene Christian	W 86–83 ^{OT}	2–1	22 – Walton	13 – Butler	6 – Wynter	Daskalakis Athletic Center (795); Philadelphia, PA
November 13, 2019*; 8:00 p.m., BTN Plus		at Rutgers; Garden State Showcase	L 57–62	2–2	11 – Walton	8 – Butler	4 – Wynter	Louis Brown Athletic Center (6,017); Piscataway, NJ
November 16, 2019*; 6:30 p.m., ESPN3		at Stephen F. Austin; Garden State Showcase	L 67–82	2–3	23 – Butler	10 – Butler	4 – Juric	William R. Johnson Coliseum (2,365); Nacogdoches, TX
November 20, 2019*; 7:00 p.m., FloSports		Bryant; Garden State Showcase	W 86–74	3–3	32 – Walton	12 – Butler	14 – Wynter	Daskalakis Athletic Center (882); Philadelphia, PA
November 25, 2019*; 11:30 a.m., FloSports		Rosemont	W 84–51	4–3	20 – Butler	10 – Butler	5 – Juric	Daskalakis Athletic Center (1,201); Philadelphia, PA
November 30, 2019*; 1:00 p.m., ESPN3		at UMBC	W 85–60	4–4	16 – Green	9 – Butler	3 – tied	UMBC Event Center (1,308); Baltimore, MD
December 4, 2019*; 7:00 p.m., NBCSPHI+		Princeton	W 82–76	5–4	31 – Wynter	12 – Butler	5 – Wynter	Daskalakis Athletic Center (1,233); Philadelphia, PA
December 7, 2019*; 2:00 p.m., NBCSPHI+		La Salle; City 6	L 63–71	5–5	19 – Walton	12 – Butler	5 – Wynter	Daskalakis Athletic Center (1,066); Philadelphia, PA
December 15, 2019*; 4:00 p.m., ESPN3		at South Florida	L 61–81	5–6	21 – Walton	7 – Butler	5 – Wynter	Yuengling Center (4,480); Tampa, FL
December 20, 2019*; 4:30 p.m.		vs. Quinnipiac; Boardwalk Battle Semifinals	W 72–63	6–6	19 – Wynter	14 – Butler	8 – Wynter	Boardwalk Hall (500); Atlantic City, NJ
December 21, 2019*; 4:30 pm		vs. Norfolk State; Boardwalk Battle Finals	W 53–49	7–6	10 – tied	13 – James	6 – Wynter	Boardwalk Hall (500); Atlantic City, NJ
CAA regular season
December 28, 2019; 2:00 p.m., NBCSPHI+		College of Charleston	L 65–76	7–7 (0–1)	21 – Wynter	13 – Butler	4 – Wynter	Daskalakis Athletic Center (830); Philadelphia, PA
December 30, 2019; 7:00 p.m., NBCSPHI+		UNC Wilmington	W 71–66	8–7 (1–1)	30 – Wynter	11 – Butler	3 – tied	Daskalakis Athletic Center (926); Philadelphia, PA
January 3, 2020; 7:00 p.m., NBCSPHI+		Delaware	W 61–55	9–7 (2–1)	18 – Wynter	16 – Butler	5 – Wynter	Daskalakis Athletic Center (1,109); Philadelphia, PA
January 9, 2020; 6:00 p.m., CBSSN		at Towson	L 73–89	9–8 (2–2)	22 – Wynter	9 – Butler	3 – tied	SECU Arena (1,123); Towson, MD
January 11, 2020; 4:00 p.m.		at James Madison	W 78–71	10–8 (3–2)	17 – Wynter	13 – Butler	7 – Wynter	JMU Convocation Center (1,967); Harrisonburg, VA
January 16, 2020; 7:00 p.m., NBCS+		Elon	W 63–41	11–8 (4–2)	27 – Wynter	15 – Butler	4 – Juric	Daskalakis Athletic Center (1,007); Philadelphia, PA
January 18, 2020; 2:00 p.m.		William & Mary	W 84–57	12–8 (5–2)	23 – Walton	12 – Butler	7 – Wynter	Daskalakis Athletic Center (1,147); Philadelphia, PA
January 23, 2020; 7:00 p.m., NESN		at Northeastern	L 52–85	12–9 (5–3)	16 – Butler	8 – Butler	5 – Wynter	Matthews Arena (794); Boston, MA
January 25, 2020; 4:00 p.m.		at Hofstra	L 59–72	12–10 (5–4)	21 – Butler	12 – Butler	4 – Wynter	Mack Sports Complex (2,453); Hempstead, NY
February 1, 2020; 2:00 p.m.		at Delaware	L 72–80	12–11 (5–5)	22 – Wynter	16 – Butler	4 – Wynter	Bob Carpenter Center (3,340); Newark, DE
February 6, 2020; 7:00 p.m., NBCS+		James Madison	W 78–67	13–11 (6–5)	18 – Butler	14 – Butler	5 – Okros	Daskalakis Athletic Center (950); Philadelphia, PA
February 8, 2020; 2:00 p.m., NBCS+		Towson	L 69–76	13–12 (6–6)	24 – Wynter	8 – Butler	4 – Wynter	Daskalakis Athletic Center (1,162); Philadelphia, PA
February 13, 2020; 7:00 p.m.		at William & Mary	L 72–77	13–13 (6–7)	24 – Wynter	9 – Wynter	8 – Wynter	Kaplan Arena (3,590); Williamsburg, VA
February 15, 2020; 4:00 p.m.		at Elon	L 70–75	13–14 (6–8)	23 – Wynter	12 – Butler	6 – Wynter	Schar Center (2,673); Elon, NC
February 20, 2020; 7:00 p.m.		Hofstra	L 74–81	13–15 (6–9)	23 – Butler	14 – Butler	9 – Butler	Daskalakis Athletic Center (852); Philadelphia, PA
February 22, 2020; 4:00 p.m.		Northeastern	L 68–77	13–16 (6–10)	20 – Wynter	7 – tied	5 – Wynter	Daskalakis Athletic Center (1,594); Philadelphia, PA
February 27, 2020; 7:00 p.m.		at UNC Wilmington	L 65–76	13–17 (6–11)	16 – Butler	12 – Butler	5 – Juric	Trask Coliseum (2,981); Wilmington, NC
February 29, 2020; 4:00 p.m.		at College of Charleston	L 66–75	13–18 (6–12)	18 – tied	11 – Butler	7 – Wynter	TD Arena (5,072); Charleston, SC
CAA tournament
March 7, 2020; 4:00 pm, FloSports	(8)	vs. (9) UNC Wilmington; First round	W 66–55	14–18	18 – Wynter	14 – Butler	3 – Wynter	Entertainment and Sports Arena; Washington, D.C.
March 8, 2020; 12:00 pm, FloSports	(8)	vs. (1) Hofstra; Quarterfinals	L 43–61	14–19	14 – Butler	14 – Butler	3 – Walton	Entertainment and Sports Arena; Washington, D.C.
*Non-conference game. ^{#}Rankings from AP poll. (#) Tournament seedings in parentheses. All times are in Eastern.

== Awards and honors ==
James Butler

- CAA All-Conference Third Team
- Preseason CAA All-Conference Honorable Mention
- "Sweep" Award (team leader in blocks)

Sam Green

- Donald Shank Spirit & Dedication Award

Matej Juric

- Dragon "D" Award (team's top defensive player)
- Team Academic Award

Coletrane Washington

- Samuel D. Cozen Award (team's most improved player)

Camren Wynter

- CAA All-Conference Second Team
- CAA Player of the Week
- Preseason CAA All-Conference Second Team
- Team Most Valuable Player
- Assist Award (team leader in assists)
- Battle of the Boardwalk MVP

== See also ==
- 2019–20 Drexel Dragons women's basketball team
