= 2019–20 Delaware Fightin' Blue Hens men's basketball team =

American college basketball season

2019–20 Delaware Fightin' Blue Hens men's basketball

Sunshine Slam champions
- Conference: Colonial Athletic Association
- Record: 22–11 (11–7 CAA)
- Head coach: Martin Ingelsby (4th season)
- Assistant coaches: Bill Phillips; Corey McCrae; Torrian Jones
- Home arena: Bob Carpenter Center

2019–20 CAA men's basketball standings
	Conf.				Overall
Team	W		L	PCT	W		L	PCT
Hofstra†	14	–	4	.778	26	–	8	.765
William & Mary	13	–	5	.722	21	–	11	.656
Towson	12	–	6	.667	19	–	13	.594
Delaware	11	–	7	.611	22	–	11	.667
Charleston	11	–	7	.611	17	–	14	.548
Northeastern	9	–	9	.500	17	–	16	.515
Elon	7	–	11	.389	13	–	21	.382
Drexel	6	–	12	.333	14	–	19	.424
UNC Wilmington	5	–	13	.278	10	–	22	.313
James Madison	2	–	16	.111	9	–	21	.300
† 2020 CAA tournament winner

The 2019–20 Delaware Fightin' Blue Hens men's basketball team represented the University of Delaware during the 2019–20 NCAA Division I men's basketball season. The Blue Hens were led by fourth-year head coach Martin Ingelsby and played their home games at the Bob Carpenter Center as members of the Colonial Athletic Association.

== Previous season ==
The Fightin' Blue Hens finished the 2018–19 season 17–16, 8–10 in CAA play to finish in fifth place. They defeated William & Mary in the quarterfinals of the CAA tournament before losing in the semifinals to Hofstra.

== Offseason ==
=== Departures ===
Name	Number	Pos.	Height	Weight	Year	Hometown	Reason for departure
Curtis Lochner	2	G	5'10"	175	Senior	Willow Grove, PA	Walk-on; graduated
Darian Bryant	4	G	6'4"	220	RS Senior	Bowie, Maryland	Graduated
Eric Carter	5	F	6'9"	235	RS Senior	Jackson, NJ	Graduated
Connor Rufo	10	G	6'3"	190	Sophomore	Hockessin, DE	Walk-on; left the team for personal reasons
Chyree Walker	11	F	6'5"	195	Sophomore	Fairfax, VA	Mid season transferred to Radford
Ithiel Horton	12	G	6'3"	180	Freshman	Vauxhall, NJ	Transferred to Pittsburgh
Ryan Johnson	13	G	6'5"	190	RS Senior	Greensboro, NC	Graduated
Matt Veretto	32	F	6'7"	190	Freshman	Manchester, CT	Left the team for personal reasons

=== Incoming transfers ===
Name	Number	Pos.	Height	Weight	Year	Hometown	Previous School
Dylan Painter	2	F	6'10"	225	RS Junior	Hershey, PA	Midseason transferred from Villanova in December during the 2018–19 season. Under NCAA transfer rules, Painter has to sit out until December and will be eligible to start in December during the 2019–20 season. Painter has one and a half years of remaining eligibility.
Reggie Gardner Jr.	5	G/F	6'3"	175	Junior	Bowie, MD	Transferred from North Carolina Central. Under NCAA transfer rules, Gardner Jr. will have to sit out for the 2019–20 season. Will have two years of remaining eligibility.

=== Recruiting class of 2019 ===
College recruiting information
Name	Hometown	School	Height	Weight	Commit date
John McCoy; SF	Mansfield, MA	The Tilton School	6 ft 5 in (1.96 m)	N/A	May 3, 2018
John McCoy; SF	Recruit ratings: No ratings found				
Ebby Asamoah, Jr. SG	Rockville, MD	Colonel Zadok A. Magruder High School	6 ft 4 in (1.93 m)	185 lb (84 kg)	May 10, 2019
Ebby Asamoah, Jr. SG	Recruit ratings: No ratings found				
Overall recruit ranking:
Note: In many cases, Scout, Rivals, 247Sports, On3, and ESPN may conflict in their listings of height and weight.; In these cases, the average was taken. ESPN grades are on a 100-point scale.; Sources: "2019 Team Ranking". Rivals.

=== Recruiting class of 2020 ===
College recruiting information (2020)
Name	Hometown	School	Height	Weight	Commit date
Gianmarco Arletti; SG	Bologna, Italy	Holy Cross Preparatory Academy	6 ft 6 in (1.98 m)	188 lb (85 kg)	Oct 5, 2019
Gianmarco Arletti; SG	Recruit ratings: No ratings found				
Andrew Carr; PF	West Chester, PA	West Chester East High School	6 ft 9 in (2.06 m)	185 lb (84 kg)	Aug 2, 2019
Andrew Carr; PF	Recruit ratings: No ratings found				
Overall recruit ranking:
Note: In many cases, Scout, Rivals, 247Sports, On3, and ESPN may conflict in their listings of height and weight.; In these cases, the average was taken. ESPN grades are on a 100-point scale.; Sources: "2020 Team Ranking". Rivals.

== Roster ==
2019–20 Delaware Fightin' Blue Hens men's basketball team
Players
Coaches

Pos.	#	Name	Height	Weight	Year	Previous school	Hometown
G	0	Ryan Allen	6 ft 2 in (1.88 m)	200 lb (91 kg)	Jr	DeMatha Catholic HS	Bowie, Maryland
G	1	Kevin Anderson	6 ft 5 in (1.96 m)	190 lb (86 kg)	Jr	St. John Neumann HS	Williamsport, Pennsylvania
F	2	Dylan Painter	6 ft 10 in (2.08 m)	225 lb (102 kg)	RS Jr	Hershey HS; Villanova	Hershey, Pennsylvania
G	3	Nate Darling	6 ft 5 in (1.96 m)	200 lb (91 kg)	RS Jr	DeMatha Catholic HS; UAB	Halifax, Nova Scotia
G	5	Reggie Gardner Jr. (redshirt)	6 ft 3 in (1.91 m)	175 lb (79 kg)	Jr	DeMatha Catholic HS; North Carolina Central	Bowie, Maryland
G	10	Johnny McCoy	6 ft 5 in (1.96 m)	190 lb (86 kg)	Fr	Tilton School	Mansfield, Massachusetts
G	11	Fred Rullo IV (W)	5 ft 11 in (1.8 m)	155 lb (70 kg)	Fr	Devon Prep	Newtown Square, Pennsylvania
G	14	Ebby Asamoah	6 ft 4 in (1.93 m)	185 lb (84 kg)	Fr	Magruder HS	Rockville, Maryland
F	15	Aleks Navakovich	6 ft 9 in (2.06 m)	200 lb (91 kg)	RS Fr	Hobart HS/Don Bosco Institute	Hobart, Indiana
F	22	Jacob Cushing	6 ft 8 in (2.03 m)	215 lb (98 kg)	Sr	Neuqua Valley HS	Naperville, Illinois
G	23	Davis Long (W)	6 ft 2 in (1.88 m)	185 lb (84 kg)	So	Sherwood HS	Brookeville, Maryland
F	25	Justyn Mutts	6 ft 7 in (2.01 m)	220 lb (100 kg)	RS So	St. Augustine Prep; High Point	Millville, New Jersey
F	33	Collin Goss	6 ft 11 in (2.11 m)	230 lb (104 kg)	RS Sr	St. Stephen's & St. Agnes School; George Washington	Manassas, Virginia

Head coach

- Martin Ingelsby (Notre Dame)

Assistant coach(es)

- Bill Phillips (St. Joseph's)
- Corey McCrae (Fordham)
- Torrian Jones (Notre Dame)

Legend

- (C) Team captain
- (S) Suspended
- (I) Ineligible
- (W) Walk-on
- Injured
- Current redshirt

Roster

== Schedule ==
Date time, TV	Rank^{#}	Opponent^{#}	Result	Record	High points	High rebounds	High assists	Site (attendance) city, state
Preseason
Oct 27, 2019*; 12:00 pm		at Penn State	L 49–75		29 – Darling	11 – Watkins	3 – Novakovich	Bryce Jordan Center; State College, PA
Non-conference regular season
Nov 5, 2019*; 7:00 pm		Bridgewater	W 97–51	1–0	23 – Mutts	13 – Mutts	9 – Anderson	Bob Carpenter Center (1,599); Newark, DE
Nov 8, 2019*; 5:00 pm, FloSports		vs. Oakland; Sunshine Slam	W 56–53	2–0	22 – Darling	10 – Goss	6 – Anderson	Silver Spurs Arena; Kissimmee, FL
Nov 9, 2019*; 2:00 pm, FloSports		vs. Southern Illinois; Sunshine Slam	W 56–54	3–0	18 – Darling	12 – Mutts	5 – Anderson	Silver Spurs Arena; Kissimmee, FL
Nov 10, 2019*; 3:00 pm, FloSports		vs. UTSA; Sunshine Slam	W 91–79	4–0	37 – Darling	9 – Goss	5 – Anderson	Silver Spurs Arena (539); Kissimmee, FL
Nov 16, 2019*; 5:00 pm		at Lafayette	W 81–73	5–0	27 – Darling	7 – Goss	3 – Anderson	Kirby Sports Center (1,233); Easton, PA
Nov 19, 2019*; 7:00 pm		at Saint Francis (PA)	W 79–64	6–0	28 – Darling	11 – Mutts	3 – Mutts	DeGol Arena (901); Loretto, PA
Nov 27, 2019*; 7:00 pm, FloSports		Stony Brook	W 75–61	7–0	22 – Allen	10 – Mutts	5 – Anderson	Bob Carpenter Center (1,771); Newark, DE
Nov 29, 2019*; 7:00 pm, FloSports		UMES	W 75–56	8–0	23 – Darling	16 – Mutts	3 – Goss	Bob Carpenter Center (1,816); Newark, DE
Dec 2, 2019*; 7:00 pm, FloSports		Columbia	W 84–76	9–0	24 – Mutts	9 – Smith	7 – Smith	Bob Carpenter Center (2,142); Newark, DE
Dec 7, 2019*; 4:00 pm		at George Washington	L 56–66	9–1	15 – Goss	8 – Mutts	5 – Anderson	Charles E. Smith Center (2,201); Washington, DC
Dec 14, 2019*; 4:00 pm, ESPN2		vs. No. 20 Villanova; Never Forget Tribute Classic	L 70–78	9–2	29 – Darling	11 – Mutts	5 – Darling	Prudential Center (7,236); Newark, NJ
Dec 16, 2019*; 7:00 pm, FloSports		Delaware State; Route 1 Rivalry	W 86–78	10–2	19 – Painter	10 – Goss	7 – Darling	Bob Carpenter Center (1,936); Newark, DE
Dec 20, 2020*; 7:00 pm		at LIU	L 75–82 ^{OT}	10–3	20 – Darling	13 – Mutts	5 – Darling	Steinberg Wellness Center (649); Brooklyn, NY
CAA regular season
Dec 28, 2019; 7:00 pm, FloSports		UNC Wilmington	W 82–68	11–3 (1–0)	21 – Darling	9 – Mutts	6 – Allen	Bob Carpenter Center (2,101); Newark, DE
Dec 30, 2019; 7:00 pm, FloSports		College of Charleston	L 75–83	11–4 (1–1)	17 – Anderson	5 – Veretto	4 – Anderson	Bob Carpenter Center (1,726); Newark, DE
Jan 3, 2020; 7:00 pm, FloSports		at Drexel	L 55–61	11–5 (1–2)	13 – Allen	7 – Painter	2 – 4 tied	Daskalakis Athletic Center (1,109); Philadelphia, PA
Jan 9, 2020; 7:00 pm, FloSports		at James Madison	W 80–76	12–5 (2–2)	23 – Painter	10 – Painter	6 – Darling	JMU Convocation Center (1,976); Harrisonburg, VA
Jan 11, 2020; 2:00 pm, FloSports		at Towson	L 68–84	12–6 (2–3)	16 – Darling	7 – Mutts	3 – Tied	SECU Arena (1,402); Towson, MD
Jan 16, 2020; 7:00 pm, FloSports		William & Mary	L 68–77	12–7 (2–4)	25 – Anderson	9 – Painter	4 – Anderson	Bob Carpenter Center (1,955); Newark, DE
Jan 18, 2020; 2:00 pm, FloSports		Elon	W 79–78	13–7 (3–4)	21 – Darling	10 – Anderson	6 – Anderson	Bob Carpenter Center (1,881); Newark, DE
Jan 23, 2020; 7:00 pm, CBSSN		at Hofstra	W 73–71	14–7 (4–4)	30 – Mutts	13 – Mutts	5 – Darling	Mack Sports Complex (2,291); Hempstead, NY
Jan 25, 2020; 12:00 pm, FloSports		at Northeastern	W 76–74	15–7 (5–4)	34 – Darling	8 – Mutts	6 – Anderson	Matthews Arena (1,017); Boston, MA
Feb 1, 2020; 2:00 pm, FloSports		Drexel	W 80–72	16–7 (6–4)	27 – Darling	10 – Painter	4 – Allen	Bob Carpenter Center (3,340); Newark, DE
Feb 6, 2020; 7:00 pm, CBSSN		Towson	W 84–78	17–7 (7–4)	34 – Darling	9 – Painter	8 – Anderson	Bob Carpenter Center (4,675); Newark, DE
Feb 8, 2020; 2:00 pm, FloSports		James Madison	W 80–78	18–7 (8–4)	27 – Darling	14 – Mutts	3 – 3 tied	Bob Carpenter Center (3,778); Newark, DE
Feb 13, 2020; 7:00 pm, FloSports		at Elon	W 81–75	19–7 (9–4)	24 – Darling	6 – Painter	5 – Anderson	Schar Center (1,712); Elon, NC
Feb 15, 2020; 4:00 pm, FloSports		at William & Mary	L 77–81	19–8 (9–5)	36 – Darling	6 – Tied	4 – Tied	Kaplan Arena (5,090); Williamsburg, VA
Feb 20, 2020; 7:00 pm, FloSports		Northeastern	W 70–48	20–8 (10–5)	17 – Darling	8 – Mutts	4 – Mutts	Bob Carpenter Center (2,561); Newark, DE
Feb 22, 2020; 4:00 pm, FloSports		Hofstra	L 62–78	20–9 (10–6)	25 – Darling	13 – Mutts	5 – Allen	Bob Carpenter Center (4,722); Newark, DE
Feb 27, 2020; 6:00 pm, CBSSN		at College of Charleston	L 71–80	20–10 (10–7)	18 – Mutts	11 – Mutts	2 – Tied	TD Arena (3,762); Charleston, SC
Feb 29, 2020; 7:00 pm, FloSports		at UNC Wilmington	W 82–65	21–10 (11–7)	14 – Anderson	7 – Darling	8 – Anderson	Trask Coliseum (3,144); Wilmington, NC
CAA tournament
March 8, 2020; 2:30 pm, FloSports	(5)	vs. (4) College of Charleston; Quarterfinals	W 79–67	22–10	25 – Darling	11 – Mutts	5 – Mutts	Entertainment and Sports Arena; Washington, D.C.
March 9, 2020; 6:00 pm, CBSSN	(5)	vs. (1) Hofstra; Semifinals	L 61–75	22–11	13 – Tied	8 – Darling	4 – Mutts	Entertainment and Sports Arena; Washington, D.C.
*Non-conference game. ^{#}Rankings from AP Poll. (#) Tournament seedings in parentheses. All times are in Eastern Time.
