= 2019–20 Charleston Cougars men's basketball team =

American college basketball season

2019–20 Charleston Cougars men's basketball
- Conference: Colonial Athletic Association
- Record: 17–14 (11–7 CAA)
- Head coach: Earl Grant (6th season)
- Assistant coaches: J.D. Powell; Eric Wilson; Mantoris Robinson
- Home arena: TD Arena

2019–20 CAA men's basketball standings
	Conf.				Overall
Team	W		L	PCT	W		L	PCT
Hofstra†	14	–	4	.778	26	–	8	.765
William & Mary	13	–	5	.722	21	–	11	.656
Towson	12	–	6	.667	19	–	13	.594
Delaware	11	–	7	.611	22	–	11	.667
Charleston	11	–	7	.611	17	–	14	.548
Northeastern	9	–	9	.500	17	–	16	.515
Elon	7	–	11	.389	13	–	21	.382
Drexel	6	–	12	.333	14	–	19	.424
UNC Wilmington	5	–	13	.278	10	–	22	.313
James Madison	2	–	16	.111	9	–	21	.300
† 2020 CAA tournament winner

The 2019–20 Charleston Cougars men's basketball team represented the College of Charleston during the 2019–20 NCAA Division I men's basketball season. The Cougars, led by fifth-year head coach Earl Grant, played their home games at the TD Arena in Charleston, South Carolina as members of the Colonial Athletic Association (CAA). In a season limited due to the COVID-19 pandemic, the Cougars finished the season 9–10, 6–4 CAA play, to finish in third place. They lost in the quarterfinals of the CAA tournament to Drexel.

Following the season, head coach Grant was hired as the new coach at Boston College. Shortly thereafter, the school named Winthrop coach Pat Kelsey the team's new head coach.

== Previous season ==
The Cougars finished the 2018–19 season 24–9, 12–6 in CAA play, to finish in third place in the conference. At the CAA tournament they defeated Drexel before losing to Northeastern in the semifinals.

== Offseason ==
=== Departures ===
Name	Number	Pos.	Height	Weight	Year	Hometown	Reason for departure
Jarrell Brantley	5	F	6'7"	250	Senior	Columbia, SC	Graduated
Isaih Moore	11	F	6'9"	195	Freshman	Columbia, SC	Transferred to Tallahassee CC
Trent Robinson	15	G	5'11"	180	Senior	Columbia, SC	Graduated
Marquise Pointer	21	G	6'0"	220	Senior	Jonesboro, AR	Graduated
Jermaine Blackmon Jr.	22	G	6'2"	230	Senior	Charlotte, NC	Graduated
Nick Harris	23	F	6'10"	260	Senior	Dacula, GA	Graduated

=== 2019 recruiting class ===
College recruiting information
Name	Hometown	School	Height	Weight	Commit date
Brenden Tucker #35 PG	Dacula, GA	Dacula High School	6 ft 1 in (1.85 m)	170 lb (77 kg)	Aug 24, 2018
Brenden Tucker #35 PG	Recruit ratings: Scout: Rivals: 247Sports: (79)				
Trevon Reddish; PG	McDonough, GA	Eagles Landing Christian Academy	6 ft 4 in (1.93 m)	185 lb (84 kg)	Sep 30, 2018
Trevon Reddish; PG	Recruit ratings: Scout: Rivals: 247Sports: (0)				
DeAngelo Epps; SF	Charlotte, NC	Charlotte Country Day	6 ft 5 in (1.96 m)	200 lb (91 kg)	May 16, 2018
DeAngelo Epps; SF	Recruit ratings: Scout: Rivals: 247Sports: (NR)				
Overall recruit ranking:
Note: In many cases, Scout, Rivals, 247Sports, On3, and ESPN may conflict in their listings of height and weight.; In these cases, the average was taken. ESPN grades are on a 100-point scale.; Sources: "2019 Team Ranking". Rivals.

== Roster ==
2019–20 Charleston Cougars men's basketball team
Players
Coaches

Pos.	#	Name	Height	Weight	Year	Previous school	Hometown
G	0	Jaylen Richard	6 ft 4 in (1.93 m)	175 lb (79 kg)	So	Charles E. Jordan HS	Durham, NC
G	1	Grant Riller	6 ft 3 in (1.91 m)	195 lb (88 kg)	RS Sr	Ocoee HS	Ocoee, FL
G	2	Brevin Galloway	6 ft 2 in (1.88 m)	215 lb (98 kg)	RS Jr	Seneca Senior HS	Anderson, SC
F	3	Deangelo Epps	6 ft 4 in (1.93 m)	205 lb (93 kg)	Fr	Carmel Christian School	Charlotte, NC
F	4	Dontavius King	6 ft 7 in (2.01 m)	250 lb (113 kg)	Fr	Potter's House Christian Academy	Greenville, SC
G	5	Brenden Tucker	6 ft 2 in (1.88 m)	180 lb (82 kg)	Fr	Dacula HS	Lawrenceville, GA
G	10	Zep Jasper	6 ft 1 in (1.85 m)	170 lb (77 kg)	RS So	Laney HS	Augusta, GA
G	13	Quan McCluney	6 ft 6 in (1.98 m)	200 lb (91 kg)	So	Gaston Day School	Gastonia, NC
F	20	Sam Miller	6 ft 9 in (2.06 m)	240 lb (109 kg)	Sr	Gonzaga College HS	Arlington, VA
G	23	Trevon Reddish	6 ft 4 in (1.93 m)	195 lb (88 kg)	Sr	Eagle's Landing Christian Academy	Carrollton, GA
F	24	Jaylen McManus	6 ft 7 in (2.01 m)	230 lb (104 kg)	Sr	North Mecklenburg HS	Charlotte, NC
G	31	Zach Rabinowitz (W)	6 ft 2 in (1.88 m)	200 lb (91 kg)	Sr	Providence HS	Charlotte, NC
G	32	Jeffrey Pizano-McInnis	6 ft 1 in (1.85 m)	205 lb (93 kg)	Fr	Marvin Ridge	Moline, IL
F/C	33	Osinachi Smart	6 ft 8 in (2.03 m)	235 lb (107 kg)	RS Jr	New Garden Friends School	Umuahia, Nigeria
C	40	Samba Ndiaye	6 ft 10 in (2.08 m)	230 lb (104 kg)	Jr	Sunrise Christian Academy (KS)	Thiès, Senegal

Head coach

- Earl Grant (Georgia College)

Assistant coach(es)

- J.D. Powell (Clemson)
- Eric Wilson (Western Carolina)
- Mantoris Robinson (Winthrop)

Legend

- (C) Team captain
- (S) Suspended
- (I) Ineligible
- (W) Walk-on
- Injured
- Current redshirt

Roster
Last update: December 16, 2019

== Schedule and results ==
Date time, TV	Rank^{#}	Opponent^{#}	Result	Record	Site (attendance) city, state
Exhibition
October 29, 2019*; 7:00 p.m.		Nebraska Wesleyan	W 91–67		TD Arena (3,164); Charleston, SC
Non-conference regular season
November 5, 2019*; 7:00 p.m., FloSports		USC Upstate	W 74–55	1–0	TD Arena (4,014); Charleston, SC
November 9, 2019*; 2:00 p.m., FloSports		Georgia State	W 84–80	2–0	TD Arena (3,853); Charleston, SC
November 13, 2019*; 9:00 p.m., CBSSN		Oklahoma State	L 54–73	2–1	TD Arena (5,005); Charleston, SC
November 19, 2019*; 7:00 p.m.		at Marshall	W 76–66	3–1	Cam Henderson Center (6,384); Huntington, WV
November 23, 2019*; 2:00 p.m., ESPN3		at UCF; Wooden Legacy campus-site game	L 71–72	3–2	Addition Financial Arena (4,578); Orlando, FL
November 28, 2019*; 4:30 p.m., ESPNews		vs. Wake Forest; Wooden Legacy quarterfinals	L 56–65	3–3	Anaheim Arena; Anaheim, CA
November 29, 2019*; 4:30 p.m., ESPNU		vs. Providence; Wooden Legacy 2nd-round consolation	W 63–55	4–3	Anaheim Arena (1,158); Anaheim, CA
December 1, 2019*; 4:00 p.m., ESPNU		vs. UCF; Wooden Legacy 5th-place game	L 56–77	4–4	Anaheim Arena; Anaheim, CA
December 8, 2019*; 2:00 p.m., FloSports		Coker	W 76–50	5–4	TD Arena (3,726); Charleston, SC
December 14, 2019*; 5:00 p.m., NBCSN		at Richmond	L 71–78	5–5	Robins Center (5,804); Richmond, VA
December 18, 2019*; 7:00 p.m., FloSports		VCU; A10–CAA Challenge	L 71–76	5–6	TD Arena (3,938); Charleston, SC
December 21, 2019*; 4:00 p.m., FloSports		South Carolina State	W 73–61	6–6	TD Arena (3,651); Charleston, SC
CAA regular season
December 28, 2019; 2:00 p.m., FloSports		at Drexel	W 76–65	7–6 (1–0)	Daskalakis Athletic Center (830); Philadelphia, PA
December 30, 2019; 7:00 p.m., FloSports		at Delaware	W 83–75	8–6 (2–0)	Bob Carpenter Center (1,725); Newark, DE
January 2, 2020; 7:00 p.m., FloSports		Towson	W 81–69	9–6 (3–0)	TD Arena (3,350); Charleston, SC
January 4, 2020; 4:00 p.m., FloSports		James Madison	W 85–69	10–6 (4–0)	TD Arena (4,224); Charleston, SC
January 9, 2020; 7:00 p.m., FloSports		at Elon	W 73–65	11–6 (5–0)	Schar Center (2,017); Elon, NC
January 11, 2020; 2:00 p.m., FloSports		at William & Mary	L 56–67	11–7 (5–1)	Kaplan Arena (4,384); Williamsburg, VA
January 16, 2020; 7:00 p.m., FloSports		Northeastern	L 76–79	11–8 (5–2)	TD Arena (4,340); Charleston, SC
January 18, 2020; 4:00 p.m., FloSports		Hofstra	W 69–67	12–8 (6–2)	TD Arena (4,301); Charleston, SC
January 25, 2020; 4:00 p.m., FloSports		UNC Wilmington	L 70–72	12–9 (6–3)	TD Arena (4,905); Charleston, SC
January 30, 2020; 6:30 p.m., CBSSN		at James Madison	W 87–68	13–9 (7–3)	JMU Convocation Center (2,482); Harrisonburg, VA
February 1, 2020; 2:00 p.m., FloSports		at Towson	W 79–70	14–9 (8–3)	SECU Arena (2,408); Towson, MD
February 6, 2020; 7:00 p.m., FloSports		William & Mary	W 68–50	15–9 (9–3)	TD Arena (4,186); Charleston, SC
February 8, 2020; 4:00 p.m., FloSports		Elon	L 65–72	15–10 (9–4)	TD Arena (5,108); Charleston, SC
February 13, 2020; 7:00 p.m., CBSSN		at Hofstra	L 63–76	15–11 (9–5)	Mack Sports Complex (2,502); Hempstead, NY
February 15, 2020; 12:00 p.m., FloSports		at Northeastern	L 51–65	15–12 (9–6)	Matthews Arena (1,473); Boston, MA
February 22, 2020; 7:00 p.m., FloSports		at UNC Wilmington	L 55–68	15–13 (9–7)	Trask Coliseum (3,557); Wilmington, NC
February 27, 2020; 6:00 p.m., CBSSN		Delaware	W 80–71	16–13 (10–7)	TD Arena (3,762); Charleston, SC
February 29, 2020; 4:00 p.m., FloSports		Drexel	W 75–66	17–13 (11–7)	TD Arena (5,072); Charleston, SC
CAA tournament
March 8, 2020; 2:30 p.m., FloSports	(4)	vs. (5) Delaware; Quarterfinals	L 67–79	17–14	Entertainment and Sports Arena (2,149); Washington, D.C.
*Non-conference game. ^{#}Rankings from AP poll. (#) Tournament seedings in parentheses. All times are in Eastern.
