= 2020 CAA men's basketball tournament =

- Classification: Division I
- Season: 2019–20
- Teams: 10
- Site: Entertainment and Sports Arena; Washington, D.C.
- Champions: Hofstra (1st title)
- Winning coach: Joe Mihalich (1st title)
- MVP: Desure Buie (Hofstra)
- Top scorer: Eli Pemberton (Hofstra) (62 points)
- Television: FloHoops, CBSSN

2019–20 CAA men's basketball standings
	Conf.				Overall
Team	W		L	PCT	W		L	PCT
Hofstra†	14	–	4	.778	26	–	8	.765
William & Mary	13	–	5	.722	21	–	11	.656
Towson	12	–	6	.667	19	–	13	.594
Delaware	11	–	7	.611	22	–	11	.667
Charleston	11	–	7	.611	17	–	14	.548
Northeastern	9	–	9	.500	17	–	16	.515
Elon	7	–	11	.389	13	–	21	.382
Drexel	6	–	12	.333	14	–	19	.424
UNC Wilmington	5	–	13	.278	10	–	22	.313
James Madison	2	–	16	.111	9	–	21	.300
† 2020 CAA tournament winner

The 2020 Colonial Athletic Association men's basketball tournament was the postseason men's basketball tournament for the Colonial Athletic Association for the 2019–20 NCAA Division I men's basketball season. The tournament was held March 7–10, 2020 at the Entertainment and Sports Arena in Washington, D.C.

== Seeds ==
All 10 CAA teams participate in the tournament. Teams are seeded by conference record, with a tiebreaker system used to seed teams with identical conference records. The top six teams receive a bye to the quarterfinals.

Seed	School	Conf.	Tiebreaker
1	Hofstra	14–4	
2	William & Mary	13–5	
3	Towson	12–6	
4	Charleston	11–7	2–0 vs. Delaware
5	Delaware	11–7	0–2 vs. Charleston
6	Northeastern	9–9	
7	Elon	7–11	
8	Drexel	6–12	
9	UNC Wilmington	5–13	
10	James Madison	2–16	

== Schedule ==
Session	Game	Time*	Matchup	Score	Television
First round – Saturday, March 7
1	1	4:00 pm	No. 8 Drexel vs. No. 9 UNC Wilmington	66–55	FloHoops
1	2	6:30 pm	No. 7 Elon vs. No. 10 James Madison	63–61	FloHoops
Quarterfinals – Sunday, March 8
2	3	12:00 pm	No. 1 Hofstra vs. No. 8 Drexel	61–43	FloHoops
2	4	2:30 pm	No. 4 Charleston vs. No. 5 Delaware	67–79	FloHoops
3	5	6:00 pm	No. 2 William & Mary vs. No. 7 Elon	63–68	FloHoops
3	6	8:30 pm	No. 3 Towson vs. No. 6 Northeastern	62–72	FloHoops
Semifinals – Monday, March 9
4	7	6:00 pm	No. 1 Hofstra vs. No. 5 Delaware	75–61	CBSSN
4	8	8:30 pm	No. 7 Elon vs. No. 6 Northeastern	60–68	CBSSN
Championship – Tuesday, March 10
5	9	7:00 pm	No. 1 Hofstra vs. No. 6 Northeastern	70–61	CBSSN
*Game times in ET. Rankings denote tournament seed

== Bracket ==
First round Saturday, March 7 FloHoops
8	Drexel	66
9	UNC Wilmington	55
7	Elon	63
10	James Madison	61

Quarterfinals; Sunday, March 8 FloHoops
1	Hofstra	61
8	Drexel	43
4	Charleston	67
5	Delaware	79
2	William & Mary	63
7	Elon	68
3	Towson	62
6	Northeastern	72

Semifinals; Monday, March 9 CBS Sports Network
1	Hofstra	75
5	Delaware	61
7	Elon	60
6	Northeastern	68

Championship; Tuesday, March 10; CBS Sports Network
1	Hofstra	70
6	Northeastern	61

* denotes overtime game

== See also ==
- 2020 CAA women's basketball tournament
