= 2019–20 Northeastern Huskies men's basketball team =

American college basketball season

2019–1920 Northeastern Huskies men's basketball
- Conference: Colonial Athletic Association
- Record: 17–16 (9–9 CAA)
- Head coach: Bill Coen (14th season)
- Assistant coaches: Chris Markwood; Brian McDonald; Manny Adako
- Home arena: Matthews Arena

2019–20 CAA men's basketball standings
	Conf.				Overall
Team	W		L	PCT	W		L	PCT
Hofstra†	14	–	4	.778	26	–	8	.765
William & Mary	13	–	5	.722	21	–	11	.656
Towson	12	–	6	.667	19	–	13	.594
Delaware	11	–	7	.611	22	–	11	.667
Charleston	11	–	7	.611	17	–	14	.548
Northeastern	9	–	9	.500	17	–	16	.515
Elon	7	–	11	.389	13	–	21	.382
Drexel	6	–	12	.333	14	–	19	.424
UNC Wilmington	5	–	13	.278	10	–	22	.313
James Madison	2	–	16	.111	9	–	21	.300
† 2020 CAA tournament winner

The 2019–20 Northeastern Huskies men's basketball team represented Northeastern University during the 2019–20 NCAA Division I men's basketball season. The Huskies, led by 14th-year head coach Bill Coen, played their home games at Matthews Arena in Boston, Massachusetts as members of the Colonial Athletic Association (CAA).

The Huskies finished the season 17–16, 9–9 in CAA play, to finish in sixth place. They lost in the finals of the CAA tournament to first seed Hofstra.

== Previous season ==
The Huskies finished the 2018–19 season 23–11, 14–4 in CAA play, to finish second place. In the CAA tournament they defeated UNC Wilmington, College of Charleston and Hofstra to become CAA tournament champions. They earned the CAA's automatic bid to the NCAA tournament as a #13 seed where they lost in the first round to Kansas.

== Offseason ==
=== Departures ===
Name	Number	Pos.	Height	Weight	Year	Hometown	Reason for departure
Shawn Occeus	1	G	6' 4"	208	Junior	Boynton Beach, FL	Declared for 2019 NBA G League draft
Vasa Pušica	4	G	6' 5"	210	RS Senior	Belgrade, Serbia	Graduated/signed to play in professional in Italy with VL Pesaro
Jeremy Miller	11	F	6' 10"	225	Senior	Milton, MA	Graduated
Donnell Gresham Jr.	22	G	6' 1"	203	RS Junior	Maplewood, MN	Graduate transferred to Georgia
Anthony Green	30	C	6' 10"	252	Senior	Quincy, MA	Graduated

=== Incoming transfers ===
Name	Number	Pos.	Height	Weight	Year	Hometown	Previous school
Guilien Smith	21	G	6' 2"	205	RS Senior	Boston, MA	Transferred from Dartmouth. Will eligible to play since Smith graduated from Dartmouth.

=== Recruiting class of 2019 ===
College recruiting
Name	Hometown	School	Height	Weight	Commit date
Tyson Walker; PG	Brooklyn, NY	New Hampton High School	6 ft 0 in (1.83 m)	150 lb (68 kg)	Jul 10, 2018
Tyson Walker; PG	Recruit ratings: Scout: Rivals: 247Sports: ESPN: (0)				
Vito Čubrilo; SG	Zagreb, Croatia	Športska Gimnazija Zagreb	6 ft 4 in (1.93 m)	194 lb (88 kg)	Apr 29, 2019
Vito Čubrilo; SG	Recruit ratings: Scout: Rivals: 247Sports: ESPN: (0)				
Quirin Emanga; SF	Wissembourg, France	Otto-Hahn-Gymnasium	6 ft 5 in (1.96 m)	215 lb (98 kg)	Jan 2, 2019
Quirin Emanga; SF	Recruit ratings: Scout: Rivals: 247Sports: ESPN: (0)				
Connor Braun; PF	Chandler, AZ	Valley Christian High School	6 ft 9 in (2.06 m)	200 lb (91 kg)	Apr 19, 2019
Connor Braun; PF	Recruit ratings: Scout: Rivals: 247Sports: ESPN: (0)				
Overall recruit ranking:
Note: In many cases, Scout, Rivals, 247Sports, On3, and ESPN may conflict in their listings of height and weight.; In these cases, the average was taken. ESPN grades are on a 100-point scale.; Sources: "2019 Team Ranking". Rivals.

=== Recruiting class of 2020 ===
College recruiting (2020)
Name	Hometown	School	Height	Weight	Commit date
Andre Weir; PF	Hollywood, FL	Chaminade-Madonna College Preparatory School	6 ft 10 in (2.08 m)	265 lb (120 kg)	Oct 9, 2019
Andre Weir; PF	Recruit ratings: Scout: Rivals: 247Sports: ESPN: (0)				
Coleman Stucke; SF	Burlington, ON	Orangeville Prep	6 ft 8 in (2.03 m)	208 lb (94 kg)	
Coleman Stucke; SF	Recruit ratings: Scout: Rivals: 247Sports: ESPN: (0)				
Overall recruit ranking:
Note: In many cases, Scout, Rivals, 247Sports, On3, and ESPN may conflict in their listings of height and weight.; In these cases, the average was taken. ESPN grades are on a 100-point scale.; Sources: "2020 Team Ranking". Rivals.

== Roster ==
2019–20 Northeastern Huskies men's basketball team
Players
Coaches

Pos.	#	Name	Height	Weight	Year	Previous school	Hometown
F	00	Jason Strong	6 ft 8 in (2.03 m)	217 lb (98 kg)	RS So	Westminster Academy	Coconut Creek, FL
G	1	Vito Cubrilo	6 ft 4 in (1.93 m)	194 lb (88 kg)	Fr	Sports Gymnasium Zagreb	Zagreb, Croatia
G	2	Tyson Walker	6 ft 0 in (1.83 m)	162 lb (73 kg)	Fr	New Hampton School	Westbury, NY
F	10	Greg Eboigbodin	6 ft 9 in (2.06 m)	225 lb (102 kg)	RS So	University of Detroit Jesuit HS; Illinois	Benin City, Nigeria
G	12	Jordan Roland	6 ft 1 in (1.85 m)	171 lb (78 kg)	RS Sr	Westhill HS; George Washington	Syracuse, NY
G	13	Myles Franklin	6 ft 4 in (1.93 m)	170 lb (77 kg)	Jr	Villa Park	Brea, CA
G/F	14	Maxime Boursiquot	6 ft 5 in (1.96 m)	211 lb (96 kg)	RS Jr	Immaculata	Ottawa, ON
G	20	Bolden Brace	6 ft 6 in (1.98 m)	225 lb (102 kg)	Sr	Santa Barbara HS	Santa Barbara, CA
G	21	Guilien Smith	6 ft 1 in (1.85 m)	200 lb (91 kg)	RS Sr	Catholic Memorial School; Dartmouth	Boston, MA
G	22	Quirin Emanga	6 ft 5 in (1.96 m)	215 lb (98 kg)	Fr	Otto-Hahn-Gymnasium	Marbach am Neckar, Germany
G/F	24	Shaquille Walters	6 ft 6 in (1.98 m)	190 lb (86 kg)	RS So	City of London Academy/Lee Academy; Santa Clara	London, England
F	32	Connor Braun	6 ft 9 in (2.06 m)	200 lb (91 kg)	Fr	Valley Christian HS	Tempe, AZ
F	33	Tomas Murphy	6 ft 8 in (2.03 m)	230 lb (104 kg)	Jr	Northfield Mount Hermon School	Wakefield, RI

Head coach

- Bill Coen (Hamilton College)

Assistant coach(es)

- Chris Markwood (Maine)
- Brian McDonald (Northeastern)
- Manny Adako (Northeastern)

Legend

- (C) Team captain
- (S) Suspended
- (I) Ineligible
- (W) Walk-on
- Injured
- Current redshirt

Roster
Last update: September 8, 2025

== Schedule and results ==
Date time, TV	Rank^{#}	Opponent^{#}	Result	Record	Site (attendance) city, state
Non-conference regular season
November 5, 2019*; 7:00 p.m.		at Boston University	W 72–67	1–0	Case Gym (1,171); Boston, MA
November 8, 2019*; 8:00 p.m., NESN		Harvard	W 84–79	2–0	Matthews Arena (1,557); Boston, MA
November 12, 2019*; 7:00 p.m., NESN+		at Massachusetts	L 71–80	2–1	Mullins Center (2,145); Amherst, MA
November 16, 2019*; 1:00 p.m., FloSports		Old Dominion	L 69–76	2–2	Matthews Arena (2,209); Boston, MA
November 19, 2019*; 7:00 p.m.		at Holy Cross	W 101–44	3–2	Hart Center (1,432); Worcester, MA
November 25, 2019*; 11:00 am, FloSports		vs. South Alabama; Gulf Coast Showcase first round	L 62–74	3–3	Hertz Arena (346); Estero, FL
November 26, 2019*; 11:00 am, FloSports		vs. Drake; Gulf Coast Showcase consolation second round	L 56–59	3–4	Hertz Arena (427); Estero, FL
November 27, 2019*; 11:00 am, FloSports		vs. Weber State; Gulf Coast Showcase seventh-place game	W 79–69	4–4	Hertz Arena (317); Estero, FL
December 4, 2018*; 7:00 p.m., NESN		Maine	W 78–63	5–4	Matthews Arena (628); Boston, MA
December 7, 2019*; 4:00 p.m., NESN+		Davidson	L 63–70	5–5	Matthews Arena (1,501); Boston, MA
December 17, 2019*; 7:00 p.m., ESPN+		at Eastern Michigan	L 55–60	5–6	Convocation Center (1,077); Ypsilanti, MI
December 19, 2019*; 7:00 p.m., ESPN3		at Detroit Mercy	W 74–61	6–6	Calihan Hall (1,151); Detroit, MI
CAA regular season
December 28, 2019; 2:00 p.m., FloSports		at Towson	W 61–45	7–6 (1–0)	SECU Arena (1,102); Towson, MD
December 30, 2019; 7:00 p.m., FloSports		at James Madison	W 88–72	8–6 (2–0)	JMU Convocation Center (1,890); Harrisonburg, VA
January 2, 2020; 7:00 p.m., NESN+		Elon	W 77–68	9–6 (3–0)	Matthews Arena (631); Boston, MA
January 4, 2020; 4:00 p.m., NESN+		William & Mary	L 64–66	9–7 (3–1)	Matthews Arena (901); Boston, MA
January 9, 2020; 8:00 p.m., CBSSN		Hofstra	L 72–74	9–8 (3–2)	Matthews Arena (1,202); Boston, MA
January 16, 2020; 7:00 p.m., FloSports		at College of Charleston	W 79–76	10–8 (4–2)	TD Arena (4,340); Charleston, SC
January 18, 2020; 7:00 p.m., FloSports		at UNC Wilmington	L 74–76 ^{OT}	10–9 (4–3)	Trask Coliseum (3,212); Wilmington, NC
January 23, 2020; 7:00 p.m., NESN		Drexel	W 85–52	11–9 (5–3)	Matthews Arena (794); Boston, MA
January 25, 2020; 12:00 p.m., NESN+		Delaware	L 74–76	11–10 (5–4)	Matthews Arena (1,017); Boston, MA
January 30, 2020; 7:00 p.m., FloSports		at William & Mary	L 58–59	11–11 (5–5)	Kaplan Arena (3,405); Williamsburg, VA
February 1, 2020; 4:00 p.m., FloSports		at Elon	L 69–74	11–12 (5–6)	Schar Center (2,023); Elon, NC
February 8, 2020; 4:00 p.m., FloSports		at Hofstra	L 71–75	11–13 (5–7)	Mack Sports Complex (3,835); Hempstead, NY
February 13, 2020; 7:00 p.m., NESN		UNC Wilmington	W 71–63	12–13 (6–7)	Matthews Arena (802); Boston, MA
February 15, 2020; 12:00 p.m., FloSports		College of Charleston	W 65–51	13–13 (7–7)	Matthews Arena (1,473); Boston, MA
February 20, 2020; 7:00 p.m., FloSports		at Delaware	L 48–70	13–14 (7–8)	Bob Carpenter Center (2,561); Newark, DE
February 22, 2020; 2:00 p.m., FloSports		at Drexel	W 77–68	14–14 (8–8)	Daskalakis Athletic Center (1,594); Philadelphia, PA
February 27, 2020; 8:00 p.m., NESN+		James Madison	W 77–57	15–14 (9–8)	Matthews Arena (901); Boston, MA
March 1, 2020; 4:00 p.m., CBSSN		Towson	L 72–75	15–15 (9–9)	Matthews Arena (1,803); Boston, MA
CAA tournament
March 8, 2020; 8:30 p.m., FloSports	(6)	vs. (3) Towson; Quarterfinals	W 72–62	16–15	Entertainment and Sports Arena; Washington, D.C.
March 9, 2020; 8:30 p.m., CBSSN	(6)	vs. (7) Elon; Semifinals	W 68–60	17–15	Entertainment and Sports Arena; Washington, D.C.
March 10, 2020; 7:00 p.m., CBSSN	(6)	vs. (1) Hofstra; Championship	L 61–70	17–16	Entertainment and Sports Arena; Washington, D.C.
*Non-conference game. ^{#}Rankings from AP poll. (#) Tournament seedings in parentheses. All times are in Eastern.
