= 2019–20 Elon Phoenix men's basketball team =

American college basketball season

2019–20 Elon Phoenix men's basketball
- Conference: Colonial Athletic Association
- Record: 13–21 (7–11 CAA)
- Head coach: Mike Schrage (1st season)
- Assistant coaches: Jonathan Holmes; Mark Adams; Allen Payne
- Home arena: Schar Center

2019–20 CAA men's basketball standings
| | Conf. | | | | Overall |
| Team | W | | L | PCT | W | | L | PCT |
|---|---|---|---|---|---|---|---|---|
| Hofstra† | 14 | – | 4 | .778 | 26 | – | 8 | .765 |
| William & Mary | 13 | – | 5 | .722 | 21 | – | 11 | .656 |
| Towson | 12 | – | 6 | .667 | 19 | – | 13 | .594 |
| Delaware | 11 | – | 7 | .611 | 22 | – | 11 | .667 |
| Charleston | 11 | – | 7 | .611 | 17 | – | 14 | .548 |
| Northeastern | 9 | – | 9 | .500 | 17 | – | 16 | .515 |
| Elon | 7 | – | 11 | .389 | 13 | – | 21 | .382 |
| Drexel | 6 | – | 12 | .333 | 14 | – | 19 | .424 |
| UNC Wilmington | 5 | – | 13 | .278 | 10 | – | 22 | .313 |
| James Madison | 2 | – | 16 | .111 | 9 | – | 21 | .300 |
† 2020 CAA tournament winner

The 2019–20 Elon Phoenix men's basketball team were an American basketball team who represented Elon University during the 2019–20 NCAA Division I men's basketball season. The Phoenix, led by first-year head coach Mike Schrage, played as sixth-year members of the Colonial Athletic Association and played their home games at the Schar Center.

== Previous season ==
The Phoenix finished the 2018–19 season 11–20, 7–11 in CAA play to finish in a two-way tie for sixth place. They lost in the first round of the CAA tournament to UNC Wilmington.

Following the season, head coach Matt Matheny was fired and former Ohio State assistant coach Mike Schrage was hired.

== Offseason ==
=== Departures ===
| Name | Number | Pos. | Height | Weight | Year | Hometown | Reason for departure |
|---|---|---|---|---|---|---|---|
| Karolis Kundrotas | 10 | F | 6'11" | 240 | Senior | Kaunas, Lithuania | Graduated |
| Maxwell Chester (W) | 11 | G | 6'1" | 185 | Junior | Atlanta, Georgia | Left team |
| Nathan Priddy | 12 | G | 6'2" | 185 | Sophomore | Argyle, Texas | Left team |
| Dainan Swoope | 13 | G | 6'0" | 180 | Senior | Overland Park, Kansas | Transferred to Sam Houston State |
| Sheldon Eberhardt | 20 | G | 6'5" | 190 | Senior | Pforzheim, Germany | Graduated |
| Steven Santa Ana | 22 | G | 6'4" | 190 | Senior | Charlotte, North Carolina | Graduated |
| Tyler Seibring | 41 | G | 6'9" | 225 | Senior | Normal, Illinois | Graduated |

=== 2019 recruiting class ===
College recruiting information
| Name | Hometown | School | Height | Weight | Commit date |
|---|---|---|---|---|---|
| Hunter McIntosh; PG | Snellville, GA | Greater Atlanta Christian School | 6 ft 3 in (1.91 m) | 180 lb (82 kg) | Apr 23, 2019 |
| Hunter McIntosh; PG | Recruit ratings: Scout: Rivals: ESPN: (NR) | | | | |
| Zac Ervin; SG | Gate City, VA | Gate City High School | 6 ft 5 in (1.96 m) | 215 lb (98 kg) | Apr 29, 2019 |
| Zac Ervin; SG | Recruit ratings: Scout: Rivals: ESPN: (NR) | | | | |
| Hunter Woods; G | Pasadena, CA | John Muir High School | 6 ft 6 in (1.98 m) | 193 lb (88 kg) | May 13, 2019 |
| Hunter Woods; G | Recruit ratings: Scout: Rivals: ESPN: (NR) | | | | |
Overall recruit ranking:
Note: In many cases, Scout, Rivals, 247Sports, On3, and ESPN may conflict in their listings of height and weight.; In these cases, the average was taken. ESPN grades are on a 100-point scale.; Sources: "Elon". ESPN.; "2019 Team Ranking". Rivals.

=== Incoming transfers ===
| Name | Number | Pos. | Height | Weight | Year | Hometown | Notes |
|---|---|---|---|---|---|---|---|
| Marcus Sheffield II | 4 | G/F | 6'4" | 180 | Graduate | Alpharetta, GA | Transferred from Stanford. Will be immediately eligible to play as he graduated from Stanford. |
| Jerald Gillens-Butler | 13 | G/F | 6'4" | 230 | Junior | Orlando, FL | Transferred from Butler. Under NCAA rules, Gillens-Butler will redshirt for the 2019–20 season and have two years of eligibility remaining. |

== Roster ==
2019–20 Elon Phoenix men's basketball team
Players
Coaches

| Pos. | # | Name | Height | Weight | Year | Previous school | Hometown |
|---|---|---|---|---|---|---|---|
| G | 0 | Hunter McIntosh | 6 ft 3 in (1.91 m) | 180 lb (82 kg) | Fr | Greater Atlanta Christian School | Snellville, GA |
| F | 1 | Chuck Hannah | 6 ft 6 in (1.98 m) | 230 lb (104 kg) | So | Northfield Mount Hermon School | Boston, MA |
| G | 3 | Seth Fuller | 5 ft 11 in (1.8 m) | 180 lb (82 kg) | RS Jr | Dublin Coffman HS | Dublin, OH |
| G | 4 | Marcus Sheffield II | 6 ft 5 in (1.96 m) | 180 lb (82 kg) | GS | Stanford | Alpharetta, GA |
| F | 5 | Federico Poser | 6 ft 8 in (2.03 m) | 230 lb (104 kg) | So | I.I.S.S. Marco Fanno School | Mareno di Piave, Italy |
| G | 10 | Kris Wooten | 6 ft 3 in (1.91 m) | 190 lb (86 kg) | Fr | Arendell Parrott Academy | Kinston, NC |
| G/F | 13 | Jerald Gillens-Butler (redshirt) | 6 ft 4 in (1.93 m) | 230 lb (104 kg) | Jr | Butler | Orlando, FL |
| G/F | 14 | Zac Ervin | 6 ft 5 in (1.96 m) | 215 lb (98 kg) | Fr | Gate City High School | Gate City, VA |
| G | 15 | Christian Scott | 6 ft 1 in (1.85 m) | 170 lb (77 kg) | Jr | St. Andrew's Episcopal School | New Orleans, LA |
| G | 21 | Andy Pack | 6 ft 4 in (1.93 m) | 200 lb (91 kg) | So | Northern Guilford HS | Summerfield, NC |
| G | 23 | Ben Daugherty (W) | 6 ft 3 in (1.91 m) | 190 lb (86 kg) | Fr | La Jolla Country Day School | Chagrin Falls, OH |
| G/F | 25 | Hunter Woods | 6 ft 6 in (1.98 m) | 193 lb (88 kg) | Fr | John Muir HS | Pasadena, CA |
| G | 30 | John Stubbs (W) | 6 ft 4 in (1.93 m) | 190 lb (86 kg) | So | Woodlands HS | Houston |
| F | 33 | Simon Wright | 6 ft 7 in (2.01 m) | 215 lb (98 kg) | Jr | Hopkins HS | Minneapolis, MN |
| F/C | 41 | Duje Radja | 6 ft 8 in (2.03 m) | 235 lb (107 kg) | Jr | Kimball Union Academy | Split, Croatia |

Head coach

- Mike Schrage (Indiana)

Assistant coach(es)

- Jonathan Holmes (North Carolina)
- Mark Adams (St. John Fisher)
- Allen Payne (Auburn)

Legend

- (C) Team captain
- (S) Suspended
- (I) Ineligible
- (W) Walk-on
- Injured
- Current redshirt

Roster
Last update: October 25, 2019

== Schedule and results ==
| Date time, TV | Rank^{#} | Opponent^{#} | Result | Record | Site (attendance) city, state |
Exhibition
| October 26, 2019*; 5:00 pm | | at Gardner–Webb | L 68–71 | | Paul Porter Arena; Boiling Springs, NC |
| October 30, 2019*; 7:00 pm | | Indiana University of Pennsylvania | W 79–71 ^{OT} | | Schar Center (740); Elon, NC |
Non-conference regular season
| November 5, 2019*; 7:30 pm, FloSports | | Mars Hill | W 90–84 | 1–0 | Schar Center (1,456); Elon, NC |
| November 8, 2019*; 7:00 pm, FloSports | | Milligan | W 95–54 | 2–0 | Schar Center (1,541); Elon, NC |
| November 11, 2019*; 7:30 pm, ACCNX | | at Georgia Tech | L 41–64 | 2–1 | McCamish Pavilion (4,624); Atlanta, GA |
| November 15, 2019*; 7:00 pm, BTN | | at Michigan; Battle 4 Atlantis campus-site game | L 50–70 | 2–2 | Crisler Center (12,707); Ann Arbor, MI |
| November 20, 2019*; 8:30 pm, ACCRSN | | at No. 5 North Carolina; Battle 4 Atlantis campus-site game | L 61–75 | 2–3 | Dean Smith Center (20,251); Chapel Hill |
| November 23, 2019*; 4:00 pm, FloSports | | Manhattan | L 64–69 | 2–4 | Schar Center (1,137); Elon, NC |
| November 26, 2019*; 7:00 pm, FloSports | | Furman; Battle 4 Atlantis campus-site game | L 61–97 | 2–5 | Schar Center (1,264); Elon, NC |
| November 28, 2019*; Noon, FloSports | | UT Arlington; Battle 4 Atlantis campus-site game | L 67–77 | 2–6 | Schar Center (875); Elon, NC |
| December 2, 2019; 7:00 pm, FloSports | | Kennesaw State | W 70–46 | 3–6 | Schar Center (1,402); Elon, NC |
| December 5, 2019*; 7:00 pm, ESPN+ | | at High Point | L 66–70 ^{OT} | 3–7 | Millis Athletic Convocation Center (1,831); High Point, NC |
| December 14, 2019*; 1:30 pm, FloSports | | North Carolina Wesleyan | W 91–60 | 4–7 | Schar Center (1,027); Elon, NC |
| December 17, 2019*; 7:00 pm, ESPN+ | | at Campbell | L 46–60 | 4–8 | Pope Convocation Center (1,178); Buies Creek, NC |
| December 21, 2019*; 7:00 pm, ESPN+ | | at Winthrop | L 80–85 | 4–9 | Winthrop Coliseum (2,139); Rock Hill, SC |
CAA regular season
| December 30, 2019; 7:00 pm, CBSSN | | William & Mary | L 73–74 | 4–10 (0–1) | Schar Center (1,923); Elon, NC |
| January 2, 2020; 7:00 pm, FloSports | | at Northeastern | L 68–77 | 4–11 (0–2) | Matthews Arena (631); Boston, MA |
| January 4, 2020; 4:00 pm, FloSports | | at Hofstra | L 75–102 | 4–12 (0–3) | Mack Sports Complex (1,809); Hempstead, NY |
| January 9, 2020; 7:00 pm, FloSports | | College of Charleston | L 65–73 | 4–13 (0–4) | Schar Center (2,017); Elon, NC |
| January 11, 2020; 4:00 pm, FloSports | | UNC Wilmington | W 80–63 | 5–13 (1–4) | Schar Center (2,068); Elon, NC |
| January 16, 2020; 2:00 pm, FloSports | | at Drexel | L 41–63 | 5–14 (1–5) | Daskalakis Athletic Center (1,007); Philadelphia, PA |
| January 18, 2020; 2:00 pm, FloSports | | at Delaware | L 78–79 | 5–15 (1–6) | Bob Carpenter Center (1,881); Newark, DE |
| January 23, 2020; 7:00 pm, FloSports | | Towson | L 61–72 | 5–16 (1–7) | Schar Center (1,732); Elon, NC |
| January 25, 2020; 4:00 pm, FloSports | | James Madison | W 82–73 | 6–16 (2–7) | Schar Center (1,896); Elon, NC |
| January 30, 2019; 7:00 pm, FloSports | | Hofstra | L 63–86 | 6–17 (2–8) | Schar Center (1,676); Elon, NC |
| February 1, 2020; 4:00 pm, FloSports | | Northeastern | W 74–69 | 7–17 (3–8) | Schar Center (2,023); Elon, NC |
| February 6, 2020; 7:00 pm, FloSports | | at UNC Wilmington | W 62–56 | 8–17 (4–8) | Trask Coliseum (2,417); Wilmington, NC |
| February 8, 2020; 4:00 pm, FloSports | | at College of Charleston | W 72–65 | 9–17 (5–8) | TD Arena (5,108); Charleston, SC |
| February 13, 2020; 7:00 pm, FloSports | | Delaware | L 75–81 | 9–18 (5–9) | Schar Center (1,712); Elon, NC |
| February 15, 2020; 7:00 pm, FloSports | | Drexel | L 70–75 | 10–18 (6–9) | Schar Center (2,673); Elon, NC |
| February 20, 2020; 7:00 pm, FloSports | | James Madison | W 70–62 | 11–18 (7–9) | JMU Convocation Center (2,078); Harrisonburg, VA |
| February 22, 2020; 2:00 pm, FloSports | | at Towson | L 71–84 | 11–19 (7–10) | SECU Arena (2,511); Towson, MD |
| February 29, 2020; 4:00 pm, FloSports | | at William & Mary | L 79–86 | 11–20 (7–11) | Kaplan Arena (5,180); Williamsburg, VA |
CAA tournament
| March 7, 2020; 6:30 pm, FloSports | (7) | vs. (10) James Madison; First round | W 63–61 | 12–20 | Entertainment and Sports Arena; Washington, D.C. |
| March 8, 2020; 6:00 pm, FloSports | (7) | vs. (2) William & Mary; Quarterfinals | W 68–63 | 13–20 | Entertainment and Sports Arena; Washington, D.C. |
| March 9, 2020; 8:30 pm, CBSSN | (7) | vs. (6) Northeastern; Semifinals | L 60–68 | 13–21 | Entertainment and Sports Arena; Washington, D.C. |
*Non-conference game. ^{#}Rankings from AP Poll. (#) Tournament seedings in parentheses. All times are in Eastern Time.
