= 2019–20 James Madison Dukes men's basketball team =

American college basketball season

2019–20 James Madison Dukes men's basketball
- Conference: Colonial Athletic Association
- Record: 9–21 (2–16 CAA)
- Head coach: Louis Rowe (4th season)
- Assistant coaches: Byron Taylor; Josh Oppenheimer; Ryan Kardok
- Home arena: JMU Convocation Center

2019–20 CAA men's basketball standings
	Conf.				Overall
Team	W		L	PCT	W		L	PCT
Hofstra†	14	–	4	.778	26	–	8	.765
William & Mary	13	–	5	.722	21	–	11	.656
Towson	12	–	6	.667	19	–	13	.594
Delaware	11	–	7	.611	22	–	11	.667
Charleston	11	–	7	.611	17	–	14	.548
Northeastern	9	–	9	.500	17	–	16	.515
Elon	7	–	11	.389	13	–	21	.382
Drexel	6	–	12	.333	14	–	19	.424
UNC Wilmington	5	–	13	.278	10	–	22	.313
James Madison	2	–	16	.111	9	–	21	.300
† 2020 CAA tournament winner

The 2019–20 James Madison Dukes men's basketball team represented James Madison University during the 2019–20 NCAA Division I men's basketball season. The Dukes, led by fourth-year head coach Louis Rowe, played their home games at the James Madison University (JMU) Convocation Center in Harrisonburg, Virginia as members of the Colonial Athletic Association (CAA). They finished the season 9–21, 2–16 in CAA play, to finish in last place. They lost in the first round of the CAA tournament to Elon.

On March 9, 2020, the school announced that head coach Louis Rowe would not return as head coach for the Dukes. A few weeks later, the school named Georgia Southern head coach Mark Byington the Dukes' new head coach.

This was the final season the Dukes would play their home games in the JMU Convocation Center as the new Atlantic Union Bank Center will be their new home for the 2020–21 season.

== Previous season ==
The Dukes finished the 2018–19 season 14–19, 6–12 in CAA play, to finish in a tie for eighth place. They defeated Towson in the first round of the CAA tournament before losing to Hofstra in the quarterfinals.

== Departures ==
Name	Number	Pos.	Height	Weight	Year	Hometown	Reason for departure
Stuckey Mosley	3	G	6' 3"	190	RS Senior	Orlando, FL	Graduated
Matthew Urbach	4	G	6' 5"	180	Freshman	Fairfax, VA	Transferred
Greg Jones	10	F	6' 7"	220	Sophomore	Richmond, VA	Transferred to Southern Connecticut
Develle Phillips	12	F	6' 9"	210	Senior	Bowie, MD	Graduated
Jonathan Hicklin	15	G	6' 4"	205	Freshman	Charlotte, NC	Transferred to Winston-Salem State
Cameron Smith	21	F	6' 7"	210	RS Senior	Tallahassee, FL	Graduated
Alex Schulz	33	F	6' 11"	265	Sophomore	Herndon, VA	Walk-on; transferred

=== Recruiting class of 2019 ===
College recruiting information
Name	Hometown	School	Height	Weight	Commit date
Michael Christmas; SF	Virginia Beach, VA	Landstown High School	6 ft 6 in (1.98 m)	195 lb (88 kg)	Oct 9, 2018
Michael Christmas; SF	Recruit ratings: Scout: Rivals: 247Sports: ESPN: (78)				
Quinn Richey; SG	Johns Creek, GA	Mount Pisgah Christian	6 ft 5 in (1.96 m)	187 lb (85 kg)	Sep 23, 2018
Quinn Richey; SG	Recruit ratings: Scout: Rivals: 247Sports: ESPN: (NR)				
Mike Fowler; PF	Raleigh, NC	Greensboro Day School	6 ft 9 in (2.06 m)	220 lb (100 kg)	Sep 23, 2018
Mike Fowler; PF	Recruit ratings: Scout: Rivals: 247Sports: ESPN: (NR)				
Julien Wooden; PF	Roanoke, VA	Northside High School	6 ft 8 in (2.03 m)	210 lb (95 kg)	Sep 28, 2018
Julien Wooden; PF	Recruit ratings: Scout: Rivals: 247Sports: ESPN: (NR)				
Jayvis Harvey; SG	Durham, NC	Southern Durham High School	6 ft 3 in (1.91 m)	N/A	Mar 13, 2019
Jayvis Harvey; SG	Recruit ratings: Scout: Rivals: 247Sports: ESPN: (NR)				
Zyon Dobbs; PG	Fairmont, WV	Fairmont Senior High School	6 ft 2 in (1.88 m)	170 lb (77 kg)	Jun 13, 2019
Zyon Dobbs; PG	Recruit ratings: Scout: Rivals: 247Sports: ESPN: (NR)				
Overall recruit ranking:
Note: In many cases, Scout, Rivals, 247Sports, On3, and ESPN may conflict in their listings of height and weight.; In these cases, the average was taken. ESPN grades are on a 100-point scale.; Sources: "2019 Team Ranking". Rivals.

== Roster ==
2019–20 James Madison Dukes men's basketball team
Players
Coaches

Pos.	#	Name	Height	Weight	Year	Previous school	Hometown
G	1	Matt Lewis	6 ft 5 in (1.96 m)	195 lb (88 kg)	Jr	Bishop O'Connell HS	Woodbridge, VA
G	2	Antanee Pinkard	6 ft 4 in (1.93 m)	205 lb (93 kg)	Sr	Hill College	Lancaster, PA
G	3	Deshon Parker	6 ft 4 in (1.93 m)	195 lb (88 kg)	So	Wayne HS	Huber Heights, OH
G	4	Dyon Dobbs	6 ft 3 in (1.91 m)	195 lb (88 kg)	Fr	Fairmont Sr. HS	Fairmont, WV
G	5	Darius Banks	6 ft 5 in (1.96 m)	220 lb (100 kg)	Jr	St. Petersburg HS	St. Petersburg, FL
F	11	Zach Jacobs	6 ft 8 in (2.03 m)	230 lb (104 kg)	Jr	Trinity Episcopal	Richmond, VA
G	13	Quinn Richey	6 ft 5 in (1.96 m)	195 lb (88 kg)	Fr	Mount Pisgah Christian	Johns Creek, GA
G	14	Jayvis Harvey	6 ft 3 in (1.91 m)	200 lb (91 kg)	Fr	Southern Durham	Durham, NC
F	20	Dalton Jefferson (W)	6 ft 7 in (2.01 m)	175 lb (79 kg)	Fr	East Rockingham	Elkton, VA
F	22	Julien Wooden	6 ft 8 in (2.03 m)	220 lb (100 kg)	Fr	Northside HS	Roanoke, VA
F	23	Michael Christmas	6 ft 6 in (1.98 m)	225 lb (102 kg)	Fr	Landstown HS	Virginia Beach, VA
F	24	Dwight Wilson	6 ft 8 in (2.03 m)	250 lb (113 kg)	Jr	Lincoln HS	Tallahassee, FL
F	35	Devon Flowers	6 ft 8 in (2.03 m)	215 lb (98 kg)	RS Fr	Potomac School	Hyattsville, MD

Head coach

- Louis Rowe (James Madison)

Assistant coach(es)

- Byron Taylor (Florida A&M)
- Josh Oppenheimer (Cal State Dominguez Hills)
- Ryan Kardok (South Florida)

Legend

- (C) Team captain
- (S) Suspended
- (I) Ineligible
- (W) Walk-on
- Injured
- Current redshirt

Roster
Last update: October 14, 2024

== Schedule and results ==
Date time, TV	Rank^{#}	Opponent^{#}	Result	Record	Site (attendance) city, state
Non-conference regular season
November 6, 2019*; 7:30 p.m., FloSports		Charlotte	W 79–74	1–0	JMU Convocation Center (3,083); Harrisonburg, VA
November 10, 2019*; 6:00 p.m., ESPNU		at No. 11 Virginia	L 34–65	1–1	John Paul Jones Arena (13,524); Charlottesville, VA
November 13, 2019*; 4:00 p.m., FloSports		Shenandoah	W 96–48	2–1	JMU Convocation Center (2,193); Harrisonburg, VA
November 16, 2019*; 7:00 p.m., MASN		at George Mason	L 70–83	2–2	EagleBank Arena (4,410); Fairfax, VA
November 20, 2019*; 7:00 p.m., ESPN3		at Old Dominion; Rivalry	W 80–78	3–2	Chartway Arena (7,001); Norfolk, VA
November 23, 2019*; 2:00 p.m., FloSports		New Hampshire	W 78–71	4–2	JMU Convocation Center (2,080); Harrisonburg, VA
November 26, 2019*; 7:00 p.m., FloSports		Coppin State	L 78–94	4–3	JMU Convocation Center (2,089); Harrisonburg, VA
November 30, 2019*; 4:00 p.m., FloSports		East Carolina	W 99–89	5–3	JMU Convocation Center (2,068); Harrisonburg, VA
December 4, 2019*; 7:00 p.m., ESPN+		at Radford	L 71–94	5–4	Dedmon Center (1,879); Radford, VA
December 16, 2019*; 7:00 p.m., FloSports		Charleston Southern	W 81–60	6–4	JMU Convocation Center (2,046); Harrisonburg, VA
December 20, 2018*; 7:00 p.m., ESPN+		at Fordham	W 75–69	7–4	Rose Hill Gymnasium (1,510); The Bronx, NY
CAA regular season
December 28, 2019; 4:00 p.m., FloSports		Hofstra	L 76–82	7–5 (0–1)	JMU Convocation Center (1,987); Harrisonburg, VA
December 30, 2019; 7:00 p.m., FloSports		Northeastern	L 72–88	7–6 (0–2)	JMU Convocation Center (1,890); Harrisonburg, VA
January 2, 2020; 7:00 p.m., CBSSN		at UNC Wilmington	W 64–60	8–6 (1–2)	Trask Coliseum (2,380); Wilmington, NC
January 4, 2020; 4:00 p.m., FloSports		at College of Charleston	L 69–85	8–7 (1–3)	TD Arena (4,224); Charleston, SC
January 9, 2020; 7:00 p.m., MASN		Delaware	L 76–80	8–8 (1–4)	JMU Convocation Center (1,976); Harrisonburg, VA
January 11, 2020; 4:00 p.m., FloSports		Drexel	L 71–78	8–9 (1–5)	JMU Convocation Center (1,967); Harrisonburg, VA
January 18, 2020; 2:00 p.m., FloSports		Towson	L 61–69	8–10 (1–6)	SECU Arena (1,320); Towson, MD
January 23, 2020; 7:00 p.m., FloSports		at William & Mary	L 75–88	8–11 (1–7)	Kaplan Arena (4,429); Williamsburg, VA
January 25, 2020; 4:00 p.m., FloSports		at Elon	L 73–82	8–12 (1–8)	Schar Center (1,896); Elon, NC
January 30, 2020; 7:00 p.m., CBSSN		College of Charleston	L 68–87	8–13 (1–9)	JMU Convocation Center (2,482); Harrisonburg, VA
February 1, 2020; 4:00 p.m., MASN2		UNC Wilmington	W 83–66	9–13 (2–9)	JMU Convocation Center (4,495); Harrisonburg, VA
February 6, 2020; 7:00 p.m., FloSports		at Drexel	L 67–78	9–14 (2–10)	Daskalakis Athletic Center (950); Philadelphia, PA
February 8, 2020; 2:00 p.m., FloSports		at Delaware	L 78–80	9–15 (2–11)	Bob Carpenter Center (3,778); Newark, DE
February 15, 2020; 8:00 p.m., FloSports		Towson	L 48–63	9–16 (2–12)	JMU Convocation Center (2,959); Harrisonburg, VA
February 20, 2020; 7:00 p.m., MASN2		Elon	L 62–70	9–17 (2–13)	JMU Convocation Center (2,078); Harrisonburg, VA
February 22, 2020; 4:00 p.m., FloSports		William & Mary	L 74–78	9–18 (2–14)	JMU Convocation Center (3,125); Harrisonburg, VA
February 27, 2020; 8:00 p.m., FloSports		at Northeastern	L 57–77	9–19 (2–15)	Matthews Arena (901); Boston, MA
February 29, 2020; 4:00 p.m., FloSports		at Hofstra	L 81–97	9–20 (2–16)	Mack Sports Complex (3,843); Hempstead, NY
CAA tournament
March 7, 2020; 6:30 p.m., FloSports	(10)	vs. (7) Elon; First round	L 61–63	9–21	Entertainment and Sports Arena; Washington, D.C.
*Non-conference game. ^{#}Rankings from AP poll. (#) Tournament seedings in parentheses. All times are in Eastern.
