= 2019–20 Towson Tigers men's basketball team =

American college basketball season

2019–20 Towson Tigers men's basketball
- Conference: Colonial Athletic Association
- Record: 19–13 (12–6 CAA)
- Head coach: Pat Skerry (9th season)
- Assistant coaches: Kevin Clark; Pat O'Connell; Branden McDonald
- Home arena: SECU Arena

2019–20 CAA men's basketball standings
	Conf.				Overall
Team	W		L	PCT	W		L	PCT
Hofstra†	14	–	4	.778	26	–	8	.765
William & Mary	13	–	5	.722	21	–	11	.656
Towson	12	–	6	.667	19	–	13	.594
Delaware	11	–	7	.611	22	–	11	.667
Charleston	11	–	7	.611	17	–	14	.548
Northeastern	9	–	9	.500	17	–	16	.515
Elon	7	–	11	.389	13	–	21	.382
Drexel	6	–	12	.333	14	–	19	.424
UNC Wilmington	5	–	13	.278	10	–	22	.313
James Madison	2	–	16	.111	9	–	21	.300
† 2020 CAA tournament winner

The 2019–20 Towson Tigers men's basketball team represented Towson University during the 2019–20 NCAA Division I men's basketball season. The Tigers, led by ninth-year head coach Pat Skerry, played their home games at the SECU Arena in Towson, Maryland as members of the Colonial Athletic Association (CAA). They finished the season 19–13, 12–6 in CAA play, to finish in third place.

== Previous season ==
The Tigers finished the 2018–19 season 10–22, 6–12 in CAA play, to finish in a tie for eighth place. They lost in the first round of the CAA tournament to James Madison.

== Offseason ==
=== Departures ===
Name	Number	Pos.	Height	Weight	Year	Hometown	Reason for departure
Jordan McNeil	2	G	6' 5"	190	RS Senior	Baltimore, MD	Graduated
Yagizhan Selcuk	10	F	6' 7"	235	Freshman	Istanbul, Turkey	Mid-season transferred to Montana
Quinton Drayton	13	G	6' 4"	206	RS Freshman	Bowie, MD	Transferred to Moberly Area CC
Alex Thomas	44	F	6' 9"	268	Senior	Hawthorne, NJ	Graduated

=== Incoming transfers ===
Name	Number	Pos.	Height	Weight	Year	Hometown	Previous school
Demetrius Mims	2	G/F	6' 6"	170	Sophomore	Baltimore, MD	Transferred from Long Beach State
Victor Uyaelunmo	34	F	6' 11"	220	Junior	Miami, FL	Transferred from USC

=== 2019 recruiting class ===
College recruiting information
Name	Hometown	School	Height	Weight	Commit date
Charles Thompson; C	Alexandria, VA	St. Stephen's & St. Agnes School	6 ft 8 in (2.03 m)	225 lb (102 kg)	Aug 18, 2018
Charles Thompson; C	Recruit ratings: Scout: Rivals: (51)				
Jason Gibson; PG	Washington, D.C.	Sidwell Friends School	6 ft 1 in (1.85 m)	150 lb (68 kg)	Mar 4, 2019
Jason Gibson; PG	Recruit ratings: Scout: Rivals: (0)				
Overall recruit ranking:
Note: In many cases, Scout, Rivals, 247Sports, On3, and ESPN may conflict in their listings of height and weight.; In these cases, the average was taken. ESPN grades are on a 100-point scale.; Sources: "2019 Team Ranking". Rivals.

=== 2020 recruiting class ===
College recruiting information (2020)
Name	Hometown	School	Height	Weight	Commit date
Darrick Jones Jr. SG	Richmond, VA	Oak Hill Academy	6 ft 3 in (1.91 m)	180 lb (82 kg)	Sep 24, 2019
Darrick Jones Jr. SG	Recruit ratings: Scout: Rivals: (0)				
Cory Barnes Jr. PG	Lewes, DE	Archbishop John Carroll High School	6 ft 1 in (1.85 m)	166 lb (75 kg)	Jun 25, 2019
Cory Barnes Jr. PG	Recruit ratings: Scout: Rivals: (0)				
Chris Biekeu; PF	Montreal, QC	Vanier College	6 ft 7 in (2.01 m)	210 lb (95 kg)	Sep 15, 2019
Chris Biekeu; PF	Recruit ratings: Scout: Rivals: (0)				
Overall recruit ranking:
Note: In many cases, Scout, Rivals, 247Sports, On3, and ESPN may conflict in their listings of height and weight.; In these cases, the average was taken. ESPN grades are on a 100-point scale.; Sources: "2020 Team Ranking". Rivals.

== Roster ==
2019–20 Towson Tigers men's basketball team
Players
Coaches

Pos.	#	Name	Height	Weight	Year	Previous school	Hometown
G	0	Tobias Howard	6 ft 2 in (1.88 m)	195 lb (88 kg)	Sr	Chipola College	Lithonia, GA
G/F	1	Demetrius Mims (redshirt)	6 ft 6 in (1.98 m)	185 lb (84 kg)	So	Long Beach State	Baltimore, Maryland
G	2	Allen Betrand	6 ft 5 in (1.96 m)	200 lb (91 kg)	RS So	Roman Catholic HS	Philadelphia, PA
G	4	Nigel Haughton (W)	6 ft 1 in (1.85 m)	170 lb (77 kg)	Fr	South Kent	Bel Air, MD
G	5	Jakigh Dottin	6 ft 2 in (1.88 m)	211 lb (96 kg)	So	Cambridge Rindge & Latin	Cambridge, MA
G	10	Jason Gibson	6 ft 1 in (1.85 m)	—	Fr	Sidwell Friends	Severna Park, MD
F	11	Dennis Tunstall	6 ft 9 in (2.06 m)	225 lb (102 kg)	RS Sr	Life Center Academy	Willingboro, NJ
F	12	Juwan Gray	6 ft 8 in (2.03 m)	215 lb (98 kg)	RS Jr	San Diego	Dover, DE
G	15	Chris Caliguiran (W)	5 ft 6 in (1.68 m)	140 lb (64 kg)	So	Bishop Ireton	Accokeek, MD
F	20	Nakye Sanders	6 ft 8 in (2.03 m)	240 lb (109 kg)	RS Sr	Duquesne	Staten Island, NY
F	22	Solomon Uyaelunmo (injured) (redshirt)	6 ft 7 in (2.01 m)	230 lb (104 kg)	So	Calvary Christian HS	Fort Lauderdale, FL
G	23	Brian Fobbs	6 ft 5 in (1.96 m)	210 lb (95 kg)	Sr	Genesee CC	New York City, NY
G	24	Greg Cross (W)	6 ft 4 in (1.93 m)	213 lb (97 kg)	Jr	Springbrook	Silver Spring, MD
G	25	Nicolas Timberlake	6 ft 4 in (1.93 m)	200 lb (91 kg)	RS Fr	Braintree	Braintree, MA
F	32	Charles Thompson	6 ft 7 in (2.01 m)	235 lb (107 kg)	Fr	St. Stephen's & St. Agnes	Fort Washington, MD
F	34	Victor Uyaelunmo (redshirt)	7 ft 0 in (2.13 m)	220 lb (100 kg)	Jr	USC	Miami, FL
G	44	Justin Patterson (W)	6 ft 4 in (1.93 m)	215 lb (98 kg)	Fr	Landon School	Bowie, MD

Head coach

- Pat Skerry (Tufts)

Assistant coach(es)

- Kevin Clark (Clark)
- Pat O'Connell (Johns Hopkins)
- Branden McDonald (Virginia Union)

Legend

- (C) Team captain
- (S) Suspended
- (I) Ineligible
- (W) Walk-on
- Injured
- Current redshirt

Roster
Last update: October 27, 2024

== Schedule and results ==
Date time, TV	Rank^{#}	Opponent^{#}	Result	Record	Site (attendance) city, state
Regular season
November 5, 2019*; 7:00 p.m.		George Washington	W 72–58	1–0	SECU Arena (2,005); Towson, MD
November 8, 2019*; 7:00 p.m.		Bryn Athyn	W 100–31	2–0	SECU Arena (1,210); Towson, MD
November 11, 2019*; 7:00 p.m.		Kent State	L 80–84	2–1	SECU Arena (1,823); Towson, MD
November 14, 2019*; 7:00 p.m., ESPN2		at No. 15 Florida; Charleston Classic non-bracket game	L 60–66	2–2	O'Connell Center (8,055); Gainesville, FL
November 21, 2019*; 7:00 a.m., ESPNU		vs. No. 18 Xavier; Charleston Classic quarterfinals	L 51–73	2–3	TD Arena; Charleston, SC
November 22, 2019*; 7:00 p.m., ESPNU		vs. Buffalo; Charleston Classic consolation 2nd round	L 73–76	2–4	TD Arena; Charleston, SC
November 24, 2019*; 6:00 p.m., ESPNU		vs. Saint Joseph's; Charleston Classic 7th-place game	W 76–64	3–4	TD Arena; Charleston, SC
December 1, 2019*; 4:00 p.m., ESPN+		at Cornell	Cancelled		Newman Arena; Ithaca, NY
December 4, 2019*; 7:00 p.m.		at Morgan State	W 76–59	4–4	Talmadge L. Hill Field House (3,789); Baltimore, MD
December 7, 2019*; 7:00 p.m., ESPN3		at Vermont	L 38–55	4–5	Patrick Gym (2,970); Burlington, VT
December 10, 2019*; 7:00 p.m.		UMBC	W 77–71	5–5	SECU Arena (1,811); Towson, MD
December 20, 2019*; 5:00 p.m.		vs. Liberty; DC Holiday Hoops semifinals	L 54–66	5–6	Entertainment and Sports Arena (707); Washington, D.C.
December 21, 2019*; 1:00 p.m.		vs. Tulane; DC Holiday Hoops 3rd-place game	W 86–82 ^{OT}	6–6	Entertainment and Sports Arena; Washington, D.C.
December 28, 2019; 2:00 p.m.		Northeastern	L 45–61	6–7 (0–1)	SECU Arena (1,102); Towson, MD
December 30, 2019; 2:00 p.m.		Hofstra	L 67–75	6–8 (0–2)	SECU Arena (1,225); Towson, MD
January 2, 2020; 7:00 p.m.		at College of Charleston	L 69–81	6–9 (0–3)	TD Arena (3,350); Charleston, SC
January 4, 2020; 7:00 p.m.		at UNC Wilmington	W 67–60	7–9 (1–3)	Trask Coliseum (2,899); Wilmington, NC
January 9, 2020; 6:00 p.m., CBSSN		Drexel	W 89–73	8–9 (2–3)	SECU Arena (1,123); Towson, MD
January 11, 2020; 2:00 p.m.		Delaware; Rivalry	W 83–68	9–9 (3–3)	SECU Arena (1,402); Towson, MD
January 18, 2020; 2:00 p.m.		James Madison	W 69–61	10–9 (4–3)	SECU Arena (1,320); Towson, MD
January 23, 2020; 7:00 p.m.		at Elon	W 72–61	11–9 (5–3)	Schar Center (1,732); Elon, NC
January 25, 2020; 4:00 p.m.		at William & Mary	W 70–58	12–9 (6–3)	Kaplan Arena (4,848); Williamsburg, VA
January 30, 2020; 7:00 p.m.		UNC Wilmington	W 77–66	13–9 (7–3)	SECU Arena (2,112); Towson, MD
February 1, 2020; 4:00 p.m.		College of Charleston	L 70–79	13–10 (7–4)	SECU Arena (2,408); Towson, MD
February 6, 2020; 7:00 p.m., CBSSN		at Delaware; Rivalry	L 78–84	13–11 (7–5)	Bob Carpenter Center (4,675); Newark, DE
February 8, 2020; 2:00 p.m.		at Drexel	W 76–69	14–11 (8–5)	Daskalakis Athletic Center (1,162); Philadelphia, PA
February 12, 2020; 7:00 p.m.		Regents	W 71–55	15–11	SECU Arena (1,096); Towson, MD
February 15, 2020; 8:00 p.m.		at James Madison	W 63–48	16–11 (9–5)	JMU Convocation Center (2,959); Harrisonburg, VA
February 20, 2020; 7:00 p.m.		William & Mary	L 51–61	16–12 (9–6)	SECU Arena (2,613); Towson, MD
February 22, 2020; 2:00 p.m.		Elon	W 84–71	17–12 (10–6)	SECU Arena (2,511); Towson, MD
February 27, 2020; 7:00 p.m.		at Hofstra	W 76–65	18–12 (11–6)	Mack Sports Complex (3,194); Hempstead, NY
March 1, 2020; 4:00 p.m., CBSSN		at Northeastern	W 75–72	19–12 (12–6)	Matthews Arena (1,803); Boston, MA
CAA tournament
March 8, 2020; 8:30 p.m.	(3)	vs. (6) Northeastern; Quarterfinals	L 62–72	19–13	Entertainment and Sports Arena (2,718); Washington, D.C.
*Non-conference game. ^{#}Rankings from AP poll. (#) Tournament seedings in parentheses. All times are in Eastern.
