= 2019–20 UNC Wilmington Seahawks men's basketball team =

American college basketball season

2019–20 UNC Wilmington Seahawks men's basketball
- Conference: Colonial Athletic Association
- Record: 10–22 (5–13 CAA)
- Head coach: C.B. McGrath (3rd season, fired 1/13/20); Rob Burke (interim)
- Assistant coaches: Doug Esleeck; Jackie Manuel; Rob Burke (until 1/13/20)
- Home arena: Trask Coliseum

2019–20 CAA men's basketball standings
	Conf.				Overall
Team	W		L	PCT	W		L	PCT
Hofstra†	14	–	4	.778	26	–	8	.765
William & Mary	13	–	5	.722	21	–	11	.656
Towson	12	–	6	.667	19	–	13	.594
Delaware	11	–	7	.611	22	–	11	.667
Charleston	11	–	7	.611	17	–	14	.548
Northeastern	9	–	9	.500	17	–	16	.515
Elon	7	–	11	.389	13	–	21	.382
Drexel	6	–	12	.333	14	–	19	.424
UNC Wilmington	5	–	13	.278	10	–	22	.313
James Madison	2	–	16	.111	9	–	21	.300
† 2020 CAA tournament winner

The 2019–20 UNC Wilmington Seahawks men's basketball team represented the University of North Carolina at Wilmington during the 2019–20 NCAA Division I men's basketball season. The Seahawks were led by interim head coach Rob Burke who took over for C. B. McGrath after an 0–6 start to conference play. They played their home games at Trask Coliseum as members of the Colonial Athletic Association.

Point guard Kai Toews left the team in December to pursue professional opportunities.

== Previous season ==
The Seahawks finished the 2018–19 season 10–23, 5–13 in CAA play to finish in last place. They defeated Elon in the quarterfinals of the CAA tournament before losing in the semifinals to Northeastern.

== Offseason ==
=== Departures ===
Name	Number	Pos.	Height	Weight	Year	Hometown	Reason for departure
Jaylen Fornes	1	G	6'3"	210	Junior	Pamlico County, NC	Transferred to Nicholls State
Jeantal Cylla	2	F	6'7"	215	RS Junior	Lake Worth, FL	Graduate transferred to Arkansas
Shawn O'Connell	4	F	6'8"	205	Senior	Roswell, GA	Graduated
Jeffrey Gary	5	G	6'4"	175	Sophomore	Austin, TX	Transferred to Mercer
Jacque Brown	13	G	5'10"	150	Senior	Beaufort, NC	Walk-on; graduated
Devontae Cacok	15	F	6'7"	240	Senior	Riverdale, GA	Graduated
Matt Elmore	20	F	6'9"	250	Sophomore	Jacksonville, NC	Transferred to Barton College
Ty Taylor	21	G	6'3"	170	RS Junior	Grandview, MO	Graduate transferred to Eastern Kentucky
Daniel Etoroma	22	G	6'6"	220	Junior	Raleigh, NC	Walk-on; Graduated
Trey Kalina	33	C	7'0"	264	Senior	Gadsden, AL	Graduated

=== Incoming transfers ===
Name	Number	Pos.	Height	Weight	Year	Hometown	Previous School
John Bowen	32	F	6'7"	200 lbs.	Junior	Bladenboro, NC	Transferred from Belmont Abbey College. Under NCAA transfer rules, Bowen would have sat out the 2019–20 season, but was granted a waiver to play immediately.

=== 2019 recruiting class ===
College recruiting information
Name	Hometown	School	Height	Weight	Commit date
Imajae Dodd; PF	Snow Hill, NC	Greene Central High School	6 ft 7 in (2.01 m)	200 lb (91 kg)	Sep 23, 2018
Imajae Dodd; PF	Recruit ratings: Scout: Rivals: (NR)				
Jake Boggs; PF	Charlotte, NC	Carmel Christian School	6 ft 7 in (2.01 m)	N/A	Sep 24, 2018
Jake Boggs; PF	Recruit ratings: Scout: Rivals: (NR)				
Overall recruit ranking:
Note: In many cases, Scout, Rivals, 247Sports, On3, and ESPN may conflict in their listings of height and weight.; In these cases, the average was taken. ESPN grades are on a 100-point scale.; Sources: "2019 Team Ranking". Rivals.

=== 2020 recruiting class ===
College recruiting information (2020)
Name	Hometown	School	Height	Weight	Commit date
Melvin Edwards Jr. SF	Carrollton, GA	Carrollton High School	6 ft 6 in (1.98 m)	195 lb (88 kg)	
Melvin Edwards Jr. SF	Recruit ratings: Scout: Rivals: 247Sports: (NR)				
Overall recruit ranking:
Note: In many cases, Scout, Rivals, 247Sports, On3, and ESPN may conflict in their listings of height and weight.; In these cases, the average was taken. ESPN grades are on a 100-point scale.; Sources: "2020 Team Ranking". Rivals.

== Roster ==
2019–20 UNC Wilmington Seahawks men's basketball team
Players
Coaches

Pos.	#	Name	Height	Weight	Year	Previous school	Hometown
G	0	Ty Gadsden	6 ft 1 in (1.85 m)	165 lb (75 kg)	Jr	Arlington Country Day School; Vincennes	Charlotte, NC
G	1	Brian Tolefree	6 ft 3 in (1.91 m)	195 lb (88 kg)	So	Eudora HS/Neosho County CC	Lawrence, KS
G	2	Shykeim Phillips	6 ft 0 in (1.83 m)	170 lb (77 kg)	Fr	South Central HS	Winterville, NC
G	4	Mike Okauru	6 ft 3 in (1.91 m)	185 lb (84 kg)	Jr	Ravenscroft School; Florida	Raleigh, NC
G	5	Jake Boggs	6 ft 7 in (2.01 m)	190 lb (86 kg)	Fr	Carmel Christian	Charlotte, NC
G	12	Jay Estime	6 ft 5 in (1.96 m)	185 lb (84 kg)	Jr	Berkmar HS	Lilburn, GA
G	22	Brent Jenkins	6 ft 5 in (1.96 m)	190 lb (86 kg)	So	Virginia Episcopal School	Elizabeth City, NC
F	23	Marten Linssen	6 ft 8 in (2.03 m)	255 lb (116 kg)	RS So	Valparaiso	Düsseldorf, Germany
F	24	Imajae Dodd	6 ft 6 in (1.98 m)	255 lb (116 kg)	Fr	Greene Central HS	Snow Hill, NC
G	30	Jaylen Sims	6 ft 6 in (1.98 m)	195 lb (88 kg)	So	United Faith Christian Academy	Charlotte, NC
F	32	John Bowen	6 ft 7 in (2.01 m)	200 lb (91 kg)	Jr	West Bladen HS/Belmont Abbey	Bladenboro, NC

Head coach

- C. B. McGrath (Kansas)

Assistant coach(es)

- Doug Esleek (North Carolina)
- Jackie Manuel (North Carolina)
- Rob Burke (Chowan)

Legend

- (C) Team captain
- (S) Suspended
- (I) Ineligible
- (W) Walk-on
- Injured
- Current redshirt

Roster
Last update: November 26, 2019

== Schedule and results ==
Date time, TV	Rank^{#}	Opponent^{#}	Result	Record	Site (attendance) city, state
Non-conference regular season
Nov 5, 2019*; 7:00 pm, FloSports		Johnson & Wales (NC)	W 103–83	1–0	Trask Coliseum (2,994); Wilmington, NC
Nov 8, 2019*; 7:00 pm, FloSports		No. 9 North Carolina	L 62–78	1–1	Trask Coliseum (5,100); Wilmington, NC
Nov 12, 2019*; 7:00 pm, FloSports		Campbell	W 81–76 ^{OT}	2–1	Trask Coliseum (3,107); Wilmington, NC
Nov 16, 2019*; 7:00 pm, ESPN+		at Davidson	L 49–87	2–2	John M. Belk Arena (3,764); Davidson, NC
Nov 19, 2019*; 7:00 pm, FloSports		NC Wesleyan; D.C. Classic	W 113–53	3–2	Trask Coliseum (3,065); Wilmington, NC
Nov 22, 2019*; 1:00 pm, FloSports		vs. Cleveland State; D.C. Classic	L 46–47	3–3	Entertainment and Sports Arena (512); Washington, D.C.
Nov 23, 2019*; 1:00 pm, FloSports		vs. FIU; D.C. Classic	W 66–63	4–3	Entertainment and Sports Arena (739); Washington, D.C.
Nov 26, 2019*; 7:00 pm, FloSports		Emory and Henry; D.C. Classic	W 122–66	5–3	Trask Coliseum (2,796); Wilmington, NC
Nov 29, 2019*; 9:00 pm		at Boise State	L 59–80	5–4	ExtraMile Arena (3,964); Boise, ID
Dec 1, 2019*; 4:00 pm, P12N		at Stanford	L 54–72	5–5	Maples Pavilion (3,298); Stanford, CA
Dec 7, 2019*; 2:00 pm, FloSports		Charlotte	L 57–76	5–6	Trask Coliseum (3,121); Wilmington, NC
Dec 16, 2019*; 7:00 pm, FloSports		Mercer	L 63–72	5–7	Trask Coliseum (2,423); Wilmington, NC
Dec 21, 2019*; 8:00 pm, SECN+		at Vanderbilt	L 73–88	5–8	Memorial Gymnasium (9,127); Nashville, TN
CAA regular season
Dec 28, 2019; 7:00 pm, FloSports		at Delaware	L 68–82	5–9 (0–1)	Bob Carpenter Center (2,101); Newark, DE
Dec 30, 2019; 7:00 pm, FloSports		at Drexel	L 66–71	5–10 (0–2)	Daskalakis Athletic Center (926); Philadelphia, PA
Jan 2, 2020; 6:30 pm, CBSSN		James Madison	L 60–64	5–11 (0–3)	Trask Coliseum (2,380); Wilmington, NC
Jan 4, 2020; 7:00 pm, FloSports		Towson	L 60–67	5–12 (0–4)	Trask Coliseum (2,899); Wilmington, NC
Jan 9, 2020; 7:00 pm, FloSports		at William & Mary	L 63–79	5–13 (0–5)	Kaplan Arena (3,328); Williamsburg, VA
Jan 11, 2020; 4:00 pm, FloSports		at Elon	L 63–80	5–14 (0–6)	Schar Center (2,068); Elon, NC
Jan 16, 2020; 7:00 pm, FloSports		Hofstra	L 61–63	5–15 (0–7)	Trask Coliseum (2,816); Wilmington, NC
Jan 18, 2020; 7:00 pm, FloSports		Northeastern	W 76–74 ^{OT}	6–15 (1–7)	Trask Coliseum (3,212); Wilmington, NC
Jan 25, 2020; 4:00 pm, FloSports		at Charleston	W 72–70	7–15 (2–7)	TD Arena (4,905); Charleston, SC
Jan 30, 2020; 7:00 pm, FloSports		at Towson	L 66–77	7–16 (2–8)	SECU Arena (2,112); Towson, MD
Feb 1, 2020; 4:00 pm, FloSports		at James Madison	L 66–83	7–17 (2–9)	JMU Convocation Center (4,495); Harrisonburg, VA
Feb 6, 2020; 7:00 pm, FloSports		Elon	L 56–62	7–18 (2–10)	Trask Coliseum (2,417); Wilmington, NC
Feb 8, 2020; 7:00 pm, FloSports		William & Mary	W 70–64	8–18 (3–10)	Trask Coliseum (4,155); Wilmington, NC
Feb 13, 2020; 7:00 pm, FloSports		at Northeastern	L 63–71	8–19 (3–11)	Matthews Arena (802); Boston, MA
Feb 15, 2020; 4:00 pm, FloSports		at Hofstra	L 64–78	8–20 (3–12)	Mack Sports Complex (2,506); Hempstead, NY
Feb 22, 2020; 7:00 pm, FloSports		Charleston	W 68–55	9–20 (4–12)	Trask Coliseum (3,557); Wilmington, NC
Feb 27, 2020; 7:00 pm, FloSports		Drexel	W 76–65	10–20 (5–12)	Trask Coliseum (2,981); Wilmington, NC
Feb 29, 2020; 7:00 pm, FloSports		Delaware	L 65–82	10–21 (5–13)	Trask Coliseum (3,144); Wilmington, NC
CAA tournament
Mar 7, 2020; 4:00 pm, FloSports	(9)	vs. (8) Drexel; First round	L 55-66	10-22	Entertainment and Sports Arena; Washington, D.C.
*Non-conference game. ^{#}Rankings from AP poll. (#) Tournament seedings in parentheses. All times are in Eastern Time.
