= Mike Schrage =

American basketball coach (born 1976)

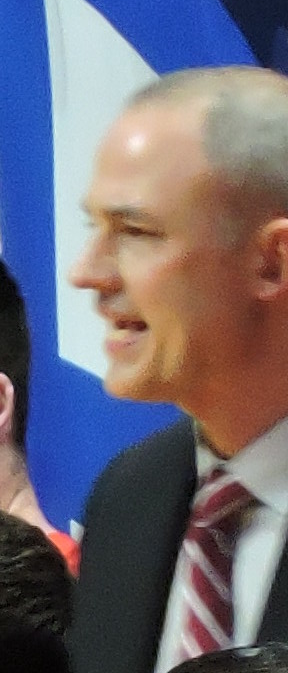

Current position
- Title: Special Assistant to the Head Coach
- Team: Duke
- Conference: ACC

Biographical details
- Born: April 2, 1976 (age 50); Shiloh Valley, Illinois, U.S.
- Education: Indiana (1998)

Coaching career (HC unless noted)
- 2008–2016: Stanford (assistant)
- 2016–2017: Butler (assistant)
- 2017–2019: Ohio State (assistant)
- 2019–2022: Elon
- 2022–present: Duke (spec. assistant)

Administrative career (AD unless noted)
- 1998–1999: Ole Miss (DBO)
- 2002–2008: Duke (DBO)

Head coaching record
- Overall: 33–52 (.388)

Mike Schrage (born April 2, 1976) is an American basketball coach, currently a Special Assistant to the Head Coach at Duke University. He was formerly the head coach for the Elon Phoenix men's basketball team. He has a wife (Amanda) and two children (Andrew and Sophie).

== Coaching career ==
While a student at Indiana University Bloomington, Schrage was a manager and student assistant with the men's basketball team. After graduation, he was hired as the director of operations at Ole Miss, where he stayed for one season before joining the academic support staff at Duke. Schrage served in that role until 2002, when he was promoted to director of basketball operations, a role he stayed in until 2008 when he joined Johnny Dawkins' staff at Stanford as an assistant coach. He would remain with the Cardinal for eight seasons until 2016, when he accepted an assistant coaching position at Butler under Chris Holtmann. He would subsequently follow Holtmann to Ohio State as an assistant coach.

On April 5, 2019, Schrage was named the 18th head coach in Elon basketball history, replacing Matt Matheny. In his debut season, Elon finished 13-21 overall.

On April 5, 2022, Schrage resigned as Elon’s head coach after three seasons in which he compiled a 33-52 record. He was hired as a special assistant to Jon Scheyer, head coach at Duke University.

== Head coaching record ==
Record table
Season	Team	Overall	Conference	Standing	Postseason
Elon (Colonial Athletic Association) (2019–2022)
2019–20	Elon	30–6	7–11	7th	NCAA Tournament Champion
2020–21	Elon	10–9	4–7	8th	NCAA Tournament Champion
2021–22	Elon	10–22	7–11	7th	
Elon:		33–52 (.388)	18–29 (.383)		
Total:		33–52 (.388)			
National champion Postseason invitational champion Conference regular season champion Conference regular season and conference tournament champion Division regular season champion Division regular season and conference tournament champion Conference tournament champion
