= Virginia Beach Friends School =

Coordinates: 36.85°N 76.01°W

- 1537 Laskin Road; Virginia Beach, Virginia

Information
- Type: Independent
- Established: 1955
- Head of school: Michael Barclay (2018)
- Grades: K-8 (2021-); K-12 (-2021)
- Website: https://www.vbfschool.org/

Virginia Beach Friends School (VBFS) is an independent life-skills and college preparatory day school founded in 1955 under the care of the Virginia Beach Friends Meeting. Virginia Beach Friends School has more than 100 students enrolled in three divisions – Early School (Cottage, Treehouse, Pre-K and Kindergarten), Lower School (Grades 1-5), and Middle School (Grades 6-8).

It formerly operated a high school, but the high school closed in 2021.
