= 2022–23 UNC Wilmington Seahawks men's basketball team =

American college basketball season

2022–23 UNC Wilmington Seahawks men's basketball

Nassau Championship champions
- Conference: Colonial Athletic Association
- Record: 24–10 (12–6 CAA)
- Head coach: Takayo Siddle (3rd season)
- Associate head coach: Kurt Kanaskie
- Assistant coaches: Craig Ponder; Paul Hemrick
- Home arena: Trask Coliseum

2022–23 CAA men's basketball standings
	Conf.				Overall
Team	W		L	PCT	W		L	PCT
Hofstra	16	–	2	.889	25	–	10	.714
Charleston †	16	–	2	.889	31	–	4	.886
Towson	12	–	6	.667	21	–	12	.636
UNC Wilmington	12	–	6	.667	24	–	10	.706
Drexel	10	–	8	.556	17	–	15	.531
Delaware	8	–	10	.444	17	–	16	.515
North Carolina A&T	8	–	10	.444	13	–	19	.406
William & Mary	7	–	11	.389	13	–	20	.394
Elon	6	–	12	.333	8	–	24	.250
Stony Brook	6	–	12	.333	11	–	22	.333
Northeastern	6	–	12	.333	10	–	20	.333
Hampton	5	–	13	.278	8	–	24	.250
Monmouth	5	–	13	.278	7	–	26	.212
† 2023 CAA tournament winner

The 2022–23 UNC Wilmington Seahawks men's basketball team represented the University of North Carolina Wilmington in the 2022–23 NCAA Division I men's basketball season. The Seahawks, led by third-year head coach Takayo Siddle, played their home games at Trask Coliseum in Wilmington, North Carolina as members of the Colonial Athletic Association (CAA).

== Previous season ==
The Seahawks finished the 2021–22 season 27–9, 15–3 in CAA play, to finish as CAA regular season co-champions, alongside Towson. As the No. 2 seed, they defeated No. 7 seed Elon and College of Charleston to reach the championship game of the CAA tournament. They were upset by No. 5 seed Delaware in the championship game. They were invited to the CBI, where they defeated VMI, Drake, Northern Colorado and Middle Tennessee to win the CBI championship.

== Roster ==
2022–23 UNC Wilmington Seahawks men's basketball team
Players
Coaches

Pos.	#	Name	Height	Weight	Year	Previous school	Hometown
G	0	Jamarii Thomas	6 ft 0 in (1.83 m)	185 lb (84 kg)	So	The Burlington School	Greensboro, NC
F	1	Eric Van Der Heijden	6 ft 9 in (2.06 m)	215 lb (98 kg)	So	Ole Miss	Raleigh, NC
G	2	Shykeim Phillips	6 ft 2 in (1.88 m)	185 lb (84 kg)	Sr	South Central High School	Winterville, NC
G	3	Maleeck Harden-Hayes	6 ft 7 in (2.01 m)	195 lb (88 kg)	Sr	North Dakota State	Moorhead, MN
G	4	Nolan Hodge	6 ft 7 in (2.01 m)	180 lb (82 kg)	Fr	Northern Guilford High School	Greensboro, NC
G	5	Noah Ross	6 ft 7 in (2.01 m)	200 lb (91 kg)	Fr	Trinity Academy	Apex, NC
G	10	Jamahri Harvey	6 ft 4 in (1.93 m)	170 lb (77 kg)	Jr	Moravian Prep	Fayetteville, NC
C	12	Victor Enoh	6 ft 8 in (2.03 m)	250 lb (113 kg)	GS	Marist	Decatur, GA
F	13	Trazarien White	6 ft 6 in (1.98 m)	190 lb (86 kg)	So	Collin College	Mansfield, TX
G	14	Riley Berkoff	6 ft 4 in (1.93 m)	180 lb (82 kg)	Fr	St. David's School	Chapel Hill, NC
F	21	Khamari McGriff	6 ft 8 in (2.03 m)	200 lb (91 kg)	RS Fr	James S. Rickards High School	Tallahassee, FL
F	23	Amari Kelly	6 ft 9 in (2.06 m)	225 lb (102 kg)	Sr	Duquesne	Norcross, GA
G	24	Makoa Surigao	6 ft 2 in (1.88 m)	195 lb (88 kg)	So	E.A. Laney High School	Wilmington, NC
G	30	Nick Farrar	6 ft 7 in (2.01 m)	230 lb (104 kg)	Jr	Charleston	Apex, NC
G	55	Donovan Newby	6 ft 1 in (1.85 m)	185 lb (84 kg)	Jr	Milwaukee	Chicago Heights, IL

Head coach

- Takayo Siddle (Gardner–Webb)

Assistant coach(es)

- Kurt Kanaskie (La Salle)
- Craig Ponder (UNC Wilmington)
- Paul Hemrick (Georgia)

Legend

- (C) Team captain
- (S) Suspended
- (I) Ineligible
- (W) Walk-on
- Injured
- Current redshirt

Roster
Last update: November 8, 2022

== Schedule and results ==
Date time, TV	Rank^{#}	Opponent^{#}	Result	Record	Site (attendance) city, state
Exhibition
November 2, 2022*; 7:00 p.m., FloHoops		Emory & Henry	W 88–47	–	Trask Coliseum (2,837); Wilmington, NC
Non-conference regular season
November 7, 2022*; 9:00 p.m., ACCN		at No. 1 North Carolina	L 56–69	0–1	Dean Smith Center (19,744); Chapel Hill, NC
November 11, 2022*; 7:00 p.m., FloHoops		Allen	W 104–55	1–1	Trask Coliseum (3,517); Wilmington, NC
November 15, 2022*; 8:00 p.m., ESPN+		at Oklahoma	L 53–74	1–2	Lloyd Noble Center (4,819); Norman, OK
November 18, 2022*; 8:30 p.m., FS2		at No. 25 UConn	L 50–86	1–3	Harry A. Gampel Pavilion (7,766); Storrs, CT
November 21, 2022*; 7:00 p.m., FloHoops		Mount Olive	W 94–47	2–3	Trask Coliseum (3,310); Wilmington, NC
November 25, 2022*; 2:30 p.m., FloHoops		vs. Missouri State; Nassau Championship first round	W 68–54	3–3	Baha Mar Convention Center (374); Nassau, Bahamas
November 26, 2022*; 5:30 p.m., FloHoops		vs. Vermont; Nassau Championship semifinals	W 68–66	4–3	Baha Mar Convention Center (311); Nassau, Bahamas
November 27, 2022*; 8:00 p.m., FloHoops		vs. North Texas; Nassau Championship final	W 55–51	5–3	Baha Mar Convention Center (414); Nassau, Bahamas
November 30, 2022*; 7:00 p.m., ESPN+		at Coastal Carolina	W 60–58	6–3	HTC Center (1,509); Conway, SC
December 6, 2022*; 7:00 p.m., FloHoops		East Carolina	W 74–61	7–3	Trask Coliseum (5,221); Wilmington, NC
December 10, 2022*; 4:00 p.m., FloHoops		Jacksonville	W 81–53	8–3	Trask Coliseum (3,055); Wilmington, NC
December 18, 2022*; 2:00 p.m., FloHoops		High Point	W 85–82	9–3	Trask Coliseum (3,745); Wilmington, NC
December 21, 2022*; 2:00 p.m., ESPN+		at Campbell	W 74–66	10–3	Gore Arena (1,514); Buses Creek, NC
CAA regular season
December 28, 2022; 5:00 p.m., CBSSN		at Monmouth	W 68–55	11–3 (1–0)	OceanFirst Bank Center (1,754); West Long Branch, NJ
December 31, 2022; 5:00 p.m., FloHoops		Hampton	W 82–65	12–3 (2–0)	Trask Coliseum (3,667); Wilmington, NC
January 4, 2023; 7:00 p.m., FloHoops		at Elon	W 81–66	13–3 (3–0)	Schar Center (1,852); Elon, NC
January 7, 2023; 2:00 p.m., FloHoops		at North Carolina A&T	W 66–61	14–3 (4–0)	Corbett Sports Center (1,904); Greensboro, NC
January 11, 2023; 7:00 p.m., FloHoops		No. 22 College of Charleston	L 69–71	14–4 (4–1)	Trask Coliseum (5,221); Wilmington, NC
January 14, 2023; 5:00 p.m., CBSSN		William & Mary	L 67–69	14–5 (4–2)	Trask Coliseum (4,571); Wilmington, NC
January 16, 2023; 7:00 p.m., FloHoops		Elon	W 62–54	15–5 (5–2)	Trask Coliseum (3,241); Wilmington, NC
January 19, 2023; 7:00 p.m., CBSSN		at Hofstra	L 46–70	15–6 (5–3)	Mack Sports Complex (1,732); Hempstead, NY
January 21, 2023; 1:00 p.m., FloHoops		at Stony Brook	W 62–51	16–6 (6–3)	Island Federal Arena (2,030); Stony Brook, NY
January 26, 2023; 7:00 p.m., FloHoops		Monmouth	W 52–49	17–6 (7–3)	Trask Coliseum (3,503); Wilmington, NC
February 2, 2023; 7:00 p.m., FloHoops		North Carolina A&T	W 87–63	18–6 (8–3)	Trask Coliseum (3,848); Wilmington, NC
February 4, 2023; 2:00 p.m., FloHoops		at William & Mary	W 70–63	19–6 (9–3)	Kaplan Arena (5,053); Williamsburg, VA
February 8, 2023; 7:00 p.m., FloHoops		at College of Charleston	L 61–93	19–7 (9–4)	TD Arena (5,101); Charleston, SC
February 11, 2023; 7:00 p.m., FloHoops		Northeastern	W 71–59	20–7 (10–4)	Trask Coliseum (5,221); Wilmington, NC
February 16, 2023; 7:00 p.m., FloHoops		at Drexel	W 72–71 ^{2OT}	21–7 (11–4)	Daskalakis Athletic Center (1,118); Philadelphia, PA
February 18, 2023; 4:00 p.m., FloHoops		at Delaware	L 66–75	21–8 (11–5)	Bob Carpenter Center (2,628); Newark, DE
February 23, 2023; 7:00 p.m., FloHoops		Stony Brook	W 76–69	22–8 (12–5)	Trask Coliseum (3,707); Wilmington, NC
February 25, 2023; 7:00 p.m., FloHoops		Towson	L 53–57	22–9 (12–6)	Trask Coliseum (4,844); Wilmington, NC
CAA tournament
March 5, 2023; 2:30 p.m., FloHoops	(4)	vs. (5) Drexel; Quarterfinals	W 73–68	23–9	Entertainment and Sports Arena (1,821); Washington, D.C.
March 6, 2023; 6:00 p.m., CBSSN	(4)	vs. (1) Hofstra; Semifinals	W 79–73 ^{OT}	24–9	Entertainment and Sports Arena; Washington, D.C.
March 7, 2023; 7:00 p.m., CBSSN	(4)	vs. (2) College of Charleston; Championship	L 58–63	24–10	Entertainment and Sports Arena (2,072); Washington, D.C.
*Non-conference game. ^{#}Rankings from AP poll. (#) Tournament seedings in parentheses. All times are in Eastern.
