= 2021–22 Colonial Athletic Association men's basketball season =

- League: NCAA Division I
- Sport: Basketball
- Duration: November, 2021 – March, 2022
- Teams: 10

Regular Season
- Co-champions: Towson, UNC Wilmington
- Runners-up: Hofstra
- Season MVP: Aaron Estrada (Hofstra)
- Top scorer: Aaron Estrada (Hofstra)

Tournament
- Champions: Delaware
- Runners-up: UNC Wilmington
- Finals MVP: Jyare Davis (Delaware)

CAA men's basketball seasons
- ← 2020–21 2022–23 →

2021–22 CAA men's basketball standings
	Conf.				Overall
Team	W		L	PCT	W		L	PCT
Towson	15	–	3	.833	25	–	9	.735
UNC Wilmington	15	–	3	.833	27	–	9	.750
Hofstra	13	–	5	.722	21	–	11	.656
Drexel	10	–	8	.556	15	–	14	.517
Delaware †	10	–	8	.556	22	–	13	.629
Charleston	8	–	10	.444	17	–	15	.531
Elon	7	–	11	.389	10	–	22	.313
James Madison*	6	–	12	.333	15	–	14	.517
William & Mary	4	–	14	.222	5	–	27	.156
Northeastern	2	–	16	.111	9	–	22	.290
† 2022 CAA tournament winner *Ineligible for conference tournament due to changing conferences in 2022

The 2021–22 CAA men's basketball season is the 36th season of Colonial Athletic Association basketball, taking place between November 2021 and March 2022. Practices began in October 2021, and the season ended with the 2022 CAA men's basketball tournament.

This is the final CAA season for James Madison, which joins the Sun Belt Conference on July 1, 2022.

== Head coaches ==
=== Coaching changes ===
- Pat Kelsey replaced Earl Grant as Charleston head coach.
- Speedy Claxton replaced Joe Mihalich as Hofstra head coach.

=== Coaches ===
Team	Head coach	Previous job	Year at school	Overall record	CAA record	CAA championships	NCAA Tournaments
College of Charleston	Pat Kelsey	Winthrop	1	0–0	0–0	0	0
Delaware	Martin Ingelsby	Notre Dame (asst.)	6	73–73	35–46	0	0
Drexel	Zach Spiker	Army	6	61–89	26–55	1	1
Elon	Mike Schrage	Ohio State (asst.)	3	23–30	10–18	0	0
Hofstra	Speedy Claxton	Hofstra (asst.)	1	0–0	0–0	0	0
James Madison	Mark Byington	Georgia Southern	2	13–7	8–2	0	0
Northeastern	Bill Coen	Boston College (asst.)	16	251–222	154–106	2	2
Towson	Pat Skerry	Pittsburgh (asst.)	11	147–164	83–89	0	0
UNC Wilmington	Takayo Siddle	NC State (asst.)	2	7–10	1–6	0	0
William & Mary	Dane Fischer	George Mason (asst.)	3	28–21	17–11	0	0

Notes:

- All records, appearances, titles, etc. are from time with current school only.
- Year at school includes 2021–22 season.
- Overall and CAA records are from time at current school and are through the end of the 2020–21 season.

== Preseason ==
=== Preseason poll ===
Rank	Team	Points
1	Delaware (19)	296
2	Northeastern (7)	246
3	Drexel (5)	234
4	James Madison (3)	224
5	Hofstra (1)	211
6	Elon (1)	202
7	College of Charleston	148
8	Towson	93
9	UNC Wilmington	64
10	William & Mary	62

() first place votes

=== Preseason All-Conference Teams ===
Award	Recipients
First Team	James Butler (Drexel); Hunter McIntosh (Elon); Dylan Painter (Delaware); Jalen Ray (Hofstra); Camren Wynter (Drexel)
Second Team	Ryan Allen (Delaware); Connor Kochera (William & Mary); Vado Morse (James Madison); Jahmyl Telfort (Northeastern); Shaquille Walters (Northeastern)
Honorable Mention	John Meeks (Charleston); Kevin Anderson (Delaware); Jameer Nelson Jr. (Delaware); Jerald Gillens-Butler (Elon); Kvonn Cramer (Hofstra); Takal Molson (James Madison); Mike Okauru (UNC Wilmington); Jaylen Sims (UNC Wilmington)

Colonial Athletic Association Preseason Player of the Year: Camren Wynter (Drexel)

== Regular season ==
=== Rankings ===
Legend
Increase in ranking
Decrease in ranking
Not ranked previous week

		Pre	Wk 2	Wk 3	Wk 4	Wk 5	Wk 6	Wk 7	Wk 8	Wk 9	Wk 10	Wk 11	Wk 12	Wk 13	Wk 14	Wk 15	Wk 16	Wk 17	Wk 18	Wk 19	Final
College of Charleston	AP																				
College of Charleston	C																				
Delaware	AP																				
Delaware	C																				
Drexel	AP																				
Drexel	C																				
Elon	AP																				
Elon	C																				
Hofstra	AP																				
Hofstra	C																				
James Madison	AP																				
James Madison	C																				
Northeastern	AP																				
Northeastern	C																				
Towson	AP																				
Towson	C																				
UNC Wilmington	AP																				
UNC Wilmington	C																				
William & Mary	AP																				
William & Mary	C																				

=== Conference matrix ===
This table summarizes the head-to-head results between teams in conference play.

	Charleston	Delaware	Drexel	Elon	Hofstra	James Madison	Northeastern	Towson	UNC Wilmington	William & Mary
vs. Charleston	–	1–1	1–1	0–2	2–0	2–0	0–2	2–0	2–0	0–2
vs. Delaware	1–1	–	1–1	0–2	2–0	0–2	0–2	2–0	2–0	0–2
vs. Drexel	1–1	1–1	–	0–2	2–0	0–2	0–2	1–1	2–0	1–1
vs. Elon	2–0	2–0	2–0	–	1–1	0–2	0–2	2–0	1–1	1–1
vs. Hofstra	0–2	0–2	0–2	1–1	–	0–2	0–2	2–0	1–1	1–1
vs. James Madison	0–2	2–0	2–0	2–0	2–0	–	0–2	2–0	2–0	0–2
vs. Northeastern	2–0	2–0	2–0	2–0	2–0	2–0	–	1–1	2–0	1–1
vs. Towson	0–2	0–2	1–1	0–2	0–2	0–2	1–1	–	1–1	0–2
vs. UNC Wilmington	0–2	0–2	0–2	1–1	1–1	0–2	0–2	1–1	–	0–2
vs. William & Mary	2–0	2–0	1–1	1–1	1–1	2–0	1–1	2–0	2–0	–
Total	8–10	10–8	10–8	7–11	13–5	6–12	2–16	15–3	15–2	4–14

== Postseason ==
=== NCAA tournament ===
The CAA had one bid to the 2022 NCAA Division I men's basketball tournament, that being the automatic bid of Delaware by winning the conference tournament.

Seed	Region	School	First Four	First Round	Second Round	Sweet 16	Elite Eight	Final Four	Championship
15	South	Delaware	Bye	Eliminated by (2) Villanova 60–80					
Bids		W-L (%):	0–0 (–)	0–1 (.000)	0–0 (–)	0–0 (–)	0–0 (–)	0–0 (–)	TOTAL: 0–1 (.000)

=== National Invitation tournament ===
Towson received an automatic bid to the 2022 National Invitation Tournament as regular season conference champions.

Seed	School	First Round	Second Round	Quarterfinals	Semifinals	Championship
7	Towson	Eliminated by (2) Wake Forest 64–74				
Bids	W-L (%):	0–1 (.000)	0–0 (–)	0–0 (–)	0–0 (–)	TOTAL: 0–1 (.000)

=== College Basketball Invitational ===
UNC Wilmington was invited to play in the 2022 College Basketball Invitational.

Seed	School	First Round	Quarterfinals	Semifinals	Championship
9	UNC Wilmington	Defeated (8) VMI 93–78	Defeated (1) Drake 76–75	Defeated (12) Northern Colorado 80–64	Defeated (2) Middle Tennessee 96–90
Bids	W-L (%):	1–0 (1.000)	1–0 (1.000)	1–0 (1.000)	TOTAL: 4–0 (1.000)

== Awards and honors ==
=== Regular season ===
==== CAA Player of the Week ====
- Nov. 15 – Zach Cooks (Hofstra)
- Nov. 22 – Ryan Allen (Delaware)
- Nov. 29 – Cam Holden (Towson)
- Dec. 6 – Aaron Estrada (Hofstra)
- Dec. 13 – Jason Gibson (Towson)
- Dec. 20 – Aaron Estrada (Hofstra)(2)
- Dec. 27 – Nicolas Timberlake (Towson)
- Jan. 3 – Darius Burford (Elon)
- Jan. 10 – Aaron Estrada (Hofstra)(3)
- Jan. 17 – Charles Falden (James Madison)
- Jan. 24 – Dylan Painter (Delaware), Shykeim Phillips (UNCW)
- Jan. 31 – Charles Thompson (Towson)
- Feb. 7 – Aaron Estrada (Hofstra)(4)
- Feb. 14 – Aaron Estrada (Hofstra)(5)
- Feb. 21 – Jaylen Sims (UNCW)
- Feb. 28 – Dimitrius Underwood (Charleston), Amari Williams (Drexel)

==== CAA Rookie of the Week ====
- Nov. 15 – Reyne Smith (Charleston)
- Nov. 22 – Reyne Smith (Charleston)(2)
- Nov. 29 – Reyne Smith (Charleston)(3)
- Dec. 6 – Reyne Smith (Charleston)(4)
- Dec. 13 – Ben Burnham (Charleston)
- Dec. 20 – Trazarien White (UNCW)
- Dec. 27 – Ben Burnham (Charleston)(2)
- Jan. 3 – Julian Lewis (William & Mary)
- Jan. 10 – Ben Burnham (Charleston)(3)
- Jan. 17 – Langdon Hatton (William & Mary)
- Jan. 24 – Reyne Smith (Charleston)(5)
- Jan. 31 – Jyare Davis (Delaware)
- Feb. 7 – Jyare Davis (Delaware)(2)
- Feb. 14 – Jyare Davis (Delaware)(3)
- Feb. 21 – Jyare Davis (Delaware)(4)
- Feb. 28 – Jyare Davis (Delaware)(5)

=== Postseason ===
==== CAA All-Conference Teams and Awards ====
Award	Recipients
Player of the Year	Aaron Estrada (Hofstra)
Coach of the Year	Takayo Siddle (UNCW)
Rookie of the Year	Jyare Davis (Delaware)
Defensive Player of the Year	Amari Williams (Drexel)
Sixth Man of the Year	Zach Cooks (Hofstra)
Dean Ehlers Leadership Award	Matey Juric (Drexel)
Scholar-Athlete of the Year	Hunter McIntosh (Elon)
First Team	Aaron Estrada (Hofstra); Cam Holden (Towson); Jaylen Sims (UNCW); Nicolas Timberlake (Towson); Camren Wynter (Drexel)
Second Team	John Meeks (Charleston); Vado Morse (James Madison); Jameer Nelson Jr. (Delaware); Mike Okauru (UNCW); Charles Thompson (Towson)
Third Team	Darius Burford (Elon); Hunter McIntosh (Elon); Jalen Ray (Hofstra); Dimitrius Underwood (Charleston); Amari Williams (Drexel)
All-Defensive Team	Cam Holden (Towson); Shykeim Phillips (UNCW); Charles Thompson (Towson); Dimitrius Underwood (Charleston); Amari Williams (Drexel)
All-Rookie Team	Ben Burnham (Charleston); Jyare Davis (Delaware); Julian Lewis (William & Mary); Tyler Rice (William & Mary); Reyne Smith (Charleston)

== Attendance ==
Team	Arena	Capacity	Game 1	Game 2	Game 3	Game 4	Game 5	Game 6	Game 7	Game 8	Total	Average	% of Capacity
Team	Arena	Capacity	Game 9	Game 10	Game 11	Game 12	Game 13	Game 14	Game 15	Game 16	Total	Average	% of Capacity
Charleston	TD Arena	5,100	4,448	4,151	4,166	5,203	3,852	3,648	3,394	3,635	60,783	4,052	79%
Charleston	TD Arena	5,100	3,844	3,230	3,719	4,634	3,516	4,283	5,060		60,783	4,052	79%
Delaware	Bob Carpenter Center	5,100	2,032	1,451	1,434	1,636	1,396	1,560	1,664	1,574	25,652	1,832	36%
Delaware	Bob Carpenter Center	5,100	2,844	2,347	1,916	1,298	1,706	2,794			25,652	1,832	36%
Drexel	Daskalakis Athletic Center	2,509	1,846	852	1,155	624	857	788	1,710	743	12,159	1,013	40%
Drexel	Daskalakis Athletic Center	2,509	838	872	690	1,184					12,159	1,013	40%
Elon	Schar Center	5,100	1,949	1,638	1,522	3,158	1,256	1,487	1,821	1,684	26,785	1,913	38%
Elon	Schar Center	5,100	1,585	2,405	2,690	1,232	1,902	2,456			26,785	1,913	38%
Hofstra	Mack Sports Complex	5,023	2,424	1,845	1,775	1,978	1,117	1,465	1,106	1,398	25,933	1,852	37%
Hofstra	Mack Sports Complex	5,023	3,793	1,359	2,556	1,454	2,247	1,416			25,933	1,852	37%
James Madison	Atlantic Union Bank Center	8,500	3,691	5,011	4,505	3,390	8,439	4,713	3,527	2,783	69,327	4,333	51%
James Madison	Atlantic Union Bank Center	8,500	3,878	4,721	3,927	4,590	3,414	4,538	3,032	5,168	69,327	4,333	51%
Northeastern	Matthews Arena	6,000	1,699	872	912	1,252	1,197	0	0	0	10,364	740	12%
Northeastern	Matthews Arena	6,000	564	667	817	518	749	1,117			10,364	740	12%
Towson	SECU Arena	5,200	2,040	1,742	1,121	1,357	1,565	732	918	968	22,301	1,593	31%
Towson	SECU Arena	5,200	1,273	1,587	1,683	1,832	3,032	2,451			22,301	1,593	31%
UNC Wilmington	Trask Coliseum	5,200	3,229	4,101	3,067	2,172	2,378	2,959	2,595	4,146	51,094	3,650	70%
UNC Wilmington	Trask Coliseum	5,200	4,206	4,310	5,250	3,020	4,411	5,250			51,094	3,650	70%
William & Mary	Kaplan Arena	8,600	2,799	1,614	2,286	2,007	1,673	1,778	1,693	2,496	32,265	2,305	27%
William & Mary	Kaplan Arena	8,600	1,783	2,472	2,352	3,885	2,295	3,132			32,265	2,305	27%
