= 2021–22 Hofstra Pride men's basketball team =

American college basketball season

2021–22 Hofstra Pride men's basketball
- Conference: Colonial Athletic Association
- Record: 21–11 (13–5 CAA)
- Head coach: Speedy Claxton (1st season)
- Assistant coaches: Tom Parrotta; Serge Clement; Mike DePaoli
- Home arena: Mack Sports Complex

2021–22 CAA men's basketball standings
	Conf.				Overall
Team	W		L	PCT	W		L	PCT
Towson	15	–	3	.833	25	–	9	.735
UNC Wilmington	15	–	3	.833	27	–	9	.750
Hofstra	13	–	5	.722	21	–	11	.656
Drexel	10	–	8	.556	15	–	14	.517
Delaware †	10	–	8	.556	22	–	13	.629
Charleston	8	–	10	.444	17	–	15	.531
Elon	7	–	11	.389	10	–	22	.313
James Madison*	6	–	12	.333	15	–	14	.517
William & Mary	4	–	14	.222	5	–	27	.156
Northeastern	2	–	16	.111	9	–	22	.290
† 2022 CAA tournament winner *Ineligible for conference tournament due to changing conferences in 2022

The 2021–22 Hofstra Pride men's basketball team represented Hofstra University during the 2021–22 NCAA Division I men's basketball season. The Pride was coached by Speedy Claxton, who was in his first season. They played their home games at Mack Sports Complex in Hempstead, New York as members of the Colonial Athletic Association.

== Previous season ==
The Pride finished the 2020–21 season 13–10, 8–6 in CAA play to come in fourth place. They lost to Elon in the semifinals of the CAA tournament.

== Roster ==
2021–22 Hofstra Pride men's basketball team
Players
Coaches

Pos.	#	Name	Height	Weight	Year	Previous school	Hometown
G	0	Darlinstone Dubar	6 ft 7 in (2.01 m)	202 lb (92 kg)	So	Iowa State	Charlotte, NC
G	1	Caleb Burgess	6 ft 3 in (1.91 m)	170 lb (77 kg)	Jr	Moravian Prep	Winston-Salem, NC
F	2	Jarrod Simmons	6 ft 8 in (2.03 m)	215 lb (98 kg)	GS	Penn	Crescent, PA
G	3	Zach Cooks	5 ft 11 in (1.8 m)	170 lb (77 kg)	GS	NJIT	Lawrenceville, GA
G	4	Aaron Estrada	6 ft 3 in (1.91 m)	190 lb (86 kg)	Jr	Oregon	Woodbury, NJ
G	5	Zion Bethea	6 ft 3 in (1.91 m)	205 lb (93 kg)	So	Immaculate Conception HS	South Orange, NJ
G	11	Jaquan Carlos	6 ft 0 in (1.83 m)	160 lb (73 kg)	Fr	Thomas Jefferson HS	Brooklyn, NY
G	12	Griffin Barrouk	6 ft 5 in (1.96 m)	210 lb (95 kg)	Fr	Bayard Rustin HS	Glen Mills, PA
G	15	Omar Silverio	6 ft 3 in (1.91 m)	200 lb (91 kg)	Sr	Rhode Island	Santiago de los Caballeros, Dominican Republic
G	20	Jalen Ray	6 ft 2 in (1.88 m)	175 lb (79 kg)	GS	Hampton	Hampton, VA
F	23	Kvonn Cramer	6 ft 6 in (1.98 m)	205 lb (93 kg)	RS So	Mount Pleasant HS	Wilmington, DE
G	24	Amar'e Marshall	6 ft 4 in (1.93 m)	204 lb (93 kg)	Fr	Roselle Catholic HS	Montclair, NJ
F	33	Christian Tomasco	6 ft 9 in (2.06 m)	190 lb (86 kg)	Fr	Archbishop Ryan HS	Moorestown, NJ
F	35	Abayomi Iyiola	6 ft 10 in (2.08 m)	215 lb (98 kg)	RS Sr	Arkansas	Atlanta, GA

Head coach

- Speedy Claxton (Hofstra)

Assistant coach(es)

- Tom Parrotta (Fordham)
- Serge Clement (SUNY Potsdam)
- Mike DePaoli (Saint Rose)

Legend

- (C) Team captain
- (S) Suspended
- (I) Ineligible
- (W) Walk-on
- Injured
- Current redshirt

Roster
Last update: January 22, 2022

== Schedule and results ==
Date time, TV	Rank^{#}	Opponent^{#}	Result	Record	Site (attendance) city, state
Non-conference regular season
November 9, 2021*; 7:00 pm, ESPN+		at No. 15 Houston	L 75–83 ^{OT}	0–1	Fertitta Center (6,883); Houston, TX
November 13, 2021*; 7:00 pm, ESPN+		at Duquesne	W 73–63	1–1	UPMC Cooper Fieldhouse (2,312); Pittsburgh, PA
November 16, 2021*; 7:00 pm, ESPN3		at Iona	L 74–82	1–2	Hynes Athletic Center (2,172); New Rochelle, NY
November 19, 2021*; 6:30 pm, FS1		at No. 20 Maryland	L 67–69	1–3	Xfinity Center (12,810); College Park, MD
November 22, 2021*; 7:00 pm, ESPN+		at Richmond	L 68–81	1–4	Robins Center (5,201); Richmond, VA
November 24, 2021*; 5:00 pm, FloHoops		Molloy	W 87–49	2–4	Mack Sports Complex (2,424); Hempstead, NY
November 27, 2021*; 2:00 pm, FloHoops		Detroit Mercy	W 98–84	3–4	Mack Sports Complex (1,845); Hempstead, NY
December 1, 2021*; 7:00 pm, FloHoops		Princeton	W 81–77	4–4	Mack Sports Complex (1,775); Hempstead, NY
December 4, 2021*; 2:00 pm, SNY/FloHoops		Bucknell	W 88–69	5–4	Mack Sports Complex (1,978); Hempstead, NY
December 8, 2021*; 7:00 pm, SNY/ESPN3		at Stony Brook	L 62–79	5–5	Island Federal Arena (2,120); Stony Brook, NY
December 12, 2021*; 2:00 pm, FloHoops		John Jay	W 102–51	6–5	Mack Sports Complex (1,117); Hempstead, NY
December 18, 2021*; 7:00 pm		vs. No. 24 Arkansas	W 89–81	7–5	Simmons Bank Arena (14,685); North Little Rock, AR
December 22, 2021*; 7:00 pm, ESPN3		at Monmouth	W 77–71	8–5	OceanFirst Bank Center (1,265); West Long Branch, NJ
CAA regular season
December 29, 2021; 7:00 pm, FloHoops		at William & Mary	L 62–63	8–6 (0–1)	Kaplan Arena (1,778); Williamsburg, VA
December 31, 2021; 12:00 pm, FloHoops		at Elon	Postponed due to COVID-19 protocols		Schar Center; Elon, NC
January 3, 2022; 12:00 pm, FloHoops		UNC Wilmington	Postponed due to COVID-19 protocols at UNC Wilmington		Mack Sports Complex; Hempstead, NY
January 5, 2022; 7:00 pm, FloHoops		College of Charleston	Postponed due to COVID-19 protocols at Charleston		Mack Sports Complex; Hempstead, NY
January 9, 2022; 4:00 pm, FloHoops		at James Madison	W 87–80	9–6 (1–1)	Atlantic Union Bank Center (3,527); Harrisonburg, VA
January 11, 2022; 5:00 pm, CBSSN		at Towson	L 66–78	9–7 (1–2)	SECU Arena (918); Towson, MD
January 15, 2022; 2:00 pm, FloHoops		Delaware	W 82–77	10–7 (2–2)	Mack Sports Complex (1,465); Hempstead, NY
January 17, 2022; 4:00 pm, SNY/FloHoops		Drexel	W 71–68	11–7 (3–2)	Mack Sports Complex (1,106); Hempstead, NY
January 22, 2022; 12:00 pm, FloHoops		at Northeastern	W 72–50	12–7 (4–2)	Matthews Arena (0); Boston, MA
January 27, 2022; 7:00 pm, FloHoops		at College of Charleston	W 76–73	13–7 (5–2)	TD Arena (3,719); Charleston, SC
January 29, 2022; 7:00 pm, FloHoops		at UNC Wilmington	L 72–78	13–8 (5–3)	Trask Coliseum (4,206); Wilmington, NC
February 3, 2022; 7:00 pm, SNY/FloHoops		Towson	L 68–78	13–9 (5–4)	Mack Sports Complex (1,398); Hempstead, NY
February 5, 2022; 2:00 pm, FloHoops		James Madison	W 85–78 ^{OT}	14–9 (6–4)	Mack Sports Complex (3,793); Hempstead, NY
February 7, 2022; 7:00 pm, CBSSN		UNC Wilmington; Rescheduled from January 3	W 73–71	15–9 (7–4)	Mack Sports Complex (1,359); Hempstead, NY
February 10, 2022; 7:00 pm, FloHoops		at Drexel	W 83–73	16–9 (8–4)	Daskalakis Athletic Center (838); Philadelphia, PA
February 12, 2022; 6:30 pm, FloHoops		at Delaware	W 80–66	17–9 (9–4)	Bob Carpenter Center (1,916); Newark, DE
February 15, 2022; 7:00 pm, FloHoops		at Elon; Rescheduled from December 31	W 97–64	18–9 (10–4)	Schar Center (1,323); Elon, NC
February 19, 2022; 2:00 pm, FloHoops		Northeastern	W 76–73	19–9 (11–4)	Mack Sports Complex (2,556); Hempstead, NY
February 24, 2022; 7:00 pm, SNY/FloHoops		Elon	L 55–81	19–10 (11–5)	Mack Sports Complex (1,454); Hempstead, NY
February 26, 2022; 2:00 pm, FloHoops		William & Mary	W 83–67	20–10 (12–5)	Mack Sports Complex (2,247); Hempstead, NY
February 28, 2022; 7:00 pm, FloHoops		College of Charleston; Rescheduled from January 5	W 89–84	21–10 (13–5)	Mack Sports Complex (1,416); Hempstead, NY
CAA tournament
March 6, 2022; 8:30 pm, FloHoops	(3)	vs. (6) College of Charleston; Quarterfinals	L 76–92	21–11	Entertainment and Sports Arena (1,578); Washington, D.C.
*Non-conference game. ^{#}Rankings from AP Poll. (#) Tournament seedings in parentheses. All times are in Eastern Time.
