= 2021–22 William & Mary Tribe men's basketball team =

American college basketball season

2021–22 William & Mary Tribe men's basketball
- Conference: Colonial Athletic Association
- Record: 5–27 (4–14 CAA)
- Head coach: Dane Fischer (3rd season)
- Assistant coaches: Mike Howland; Nate Bollinger; Julian Boatner
- Home arena: Kaplan Arena

2021–22 CAA men's basketball standings
	Conf.				Overall
Team	W		L	PCT	W		L	PCT
Towson	15	–	3	.833	25	–	9	.735
UNC Wilmington	15	–	3	.833	27	–	9	.750
Hofstra	13	–	5	.722	21	–	11	.656
Drexel	10	–	8	.556	15	–	14	.517
Delaware †	10	–	8	.556	22	–	13	.629
Charleston	8	–	10	.444	17	–	15	.531
Elon	7	–	11	.389	10	–	22	.313
James Madison*	6	–	12	.333	15	–	14	.517
William & Mary	4	–	14	.222	5	–	27	.156
Northeastern	2	–	16	.111	9	–	22	.290
† 2022 CAA tournament winner *Ineligible for conference tournament due to changing conferences in 2022

The 2021–22 William & Mary Tribe men's basketball team represented the College of William & Mary in the 2021–22 NCAA Division I men's basketball season. The Tribe, led by third-year head coach Dane Fischer, played their home games at Kaplan Arena in Williamsburg, Virginia as members of the Colonial Athletic Association (CAA).

The Tribe finished the season 5–27, 4–14 in CAA play, to finish in ninth place. In the CAA tournament, they were defeated by Northeastern in the first round.

== Previous season ==
In a season limited due to the ongoing COVID-19 pandemic, the Tribe finished the 2020–21 season 7–10, 4–6 in CAA play, to finish in seventh place. They lost to Northeastern in the quarterfinals of the CAA tournament.

== Offseason ==
=== Departures ===
Name	Number	Pos.	Height	Weight	Year	Hometown	Reason for departure
Miodrag Dronjak	4	G	6' 3"	196	Senior	Kladovo, Serbia	Graduated
Luke Loewe	12	G	6' 4"	188	Senior	Fond du Lac, WI	Graduate transferred to Minnesota
Thornton Scott	11	G	6' 5"	185	Senior	Glen Cove, NY	Retired
Thatcher Stone	11	G/F	6' 6"	200	Sophomore	Medford, MA	Left team, later transferred to Stonehill

=== Incoming transfers ===
Name	Number	Pos.	Height	Weight	Year	Hometown	Previous school
Brandon Carroll	4	G	6' 7"	210	Graduate student	The Bronx, NY	Transferred from Florida Southern. Eligible to play immediately since Carroll graduated from Florida Southern.

=== 2021 recruiting class ===
College recruiting information
Name	Hometown	School	Height	Weight	Commit date
Langdon Hatton; F	Georgetown, IN	North Harrison High School	6 ft 10 in (2.08 m)	230 lb (100 kg)	Sep 4, 2020
Langdon Hatton; F	Recruit ratings: Scout: Rivals: (NR)				
Julian Lewis; SG	Ann Arbor, MI	Huron High School	6 ft 6 in (1.98 m)	200 lb (91 kg)	Jun 1, 2021
Julian Lewis; SG	Recruit ratings: Scout: Rivals: (NR)				
Tyler Rice; PG	Columbia, SC	Ridge View High School	6 ft 1 in (1.85 m)	178 lb (81 kg)	Jun 24, 2020
Tyler Rice; PG	Recruit ratings: Scout: Rivals: (NR)				
Overall recruit ranking: 247Sports: 242
Note: In many cases, Scout, Rivals, 247Sports, On3, and ESPN may conflict in their listings of height and weight.; In these cases, the average was taken. ESPN grades are on a 100-point scale.; Sources: "2021 Team Ranking". Rivals.

== Roster ==
2021–22 William & Mary Tribe men's basketball team
Players
Coaches

Pos.	#	Name	Height	Weight	Year	Previous school	Hometown
F	0	Kurt Jr. Samuels	6 ft 5 in (1.96 m)	230 lb (104 kg)	So	St. Stephen's & St. Agnes School	Alexandria, VA
G	1	Jake Milkereit	6 ft 5 in (1.96 m)	200 lb (91 kg)	So	Bishop Lynch HS	Dallas, TX
G	2	Julian Lewis	6 ft 6 in (1.98 m)	200 lb (91 kg)	Fr	Huron HS	Ann Arbor, MI
G/F	4	Brandon Carroll	6 ft 7 in (2.01 m)	210 lb (95 kg)	GS	Florida Southern	The Bronx, NY
G	5	Yuri Covington	6 ft 1 in (1.85 m)	192 lb (87 kg)	So	National Christian Academy	Wilkes-Barre, PA
G	10	Rainers Hermanovskis	6 ft 4 in (1.93 m)	201 lb (91 kg)	Jr	Riga Secondary School Nr.49	Smiltene, Latvia
G	12	Tyler Rice	6 ft 1 in (1.85 m)	178 lb (81 kg)	Fr	Ridge View HS	Columbia, SC
G	15	Miguel Ayesa	6 ft 5 in (1.96 m)	201 lb (91 kg)	Jr	National Top Sports Institute	Madrid, Spain
F	21	Quinn Blair	6 ft 7 in (2.01 m)	225 lb (102 kg)	RS Sr	Dearborn Divine Child HS	Livonia, MI
G	23	Connor Kochera	6 ft 5 in (1.96 m)	200 lb (91 kg)	So	Saint Viator HS	Arlington Heights, IL
G	24	Austin Washburn	6 ft 4 in (1.93 m)	175 lb (79 kg)	Sr	Powhatan HS	Powhatan, VA
F/C	30	Mehkel Harvey	6 ft 9 in (2.06 m)	225 lb (102 kg)	Sr	Ocean View HS	Huntington Beach, CA
F	33	Langdon Hatton	6 ft 10 in (2.08 m)	230 lb (104 kg)	Fr	North Harrison HS	Georgetown, IN
F	35	Ben Wight	6 ft 9 in (2.06 m)	205 lb (93 kg)	So	Thomas Worthington HS	Columbus, OH

Head coach

- Dane Fischer (Ithaca)

Assistant coach(es)

- Mike Howland (DePauw)
- Julian Boatner (William & Mary)
- Nate Bollinger (Millersville)

Legend

- (C) Team captain
- (S) Suspended
- (I) Ineligible
- (W) Walk-on
- Injured
- Current redshirt

Roster
Last update: January 22, 2022

== Schedule and results ==
Date time, TV	Rank^{#}	Opponent^{#}	Result	Record	Site (attendance) city, state
Non-conference regular season
November 10, 2021*; 7:00 p.m., ACCNX/ESPN+		at Wake Forest	L 59–77	0–1	LJVM Coliseum (3,710); Winston-Salem, NC
November 12, 2021*; 7:00 p.m., FloHoops		American	L 62–74	0–2	Kaplan Arena (2,799); Williamsburg, VA
November 16, 2021*; 7:00 p.m.		at Norfolk State	L 74–91	0–3	Joseph G. Echols Memorial Hall (1,898); Norfolk, VA
November 20, 2021*; 5:00 p.m.		vs. Georgia State; Legends Classic at High Point	L 59–77	0–4	Qubein Center (1,570); High Point, NC
November 21, 2021*; 5:00 p.m., ESPN+		vs. Howard; Legends Classic at High Point	L 76–82	0–5	Qubein Center (1,230); High Point, NC
November 24, 2021*; 5:00 p.m., ESPN+		at Radford	L 54–67	0–6	Dedmon Center (1,016); Radford, VA
November 27, 2021*; 4:00 p.m., FloHoops		Mary Baldwin	W 87–50	1–6	Kaplan Arena (1,614); Williamsburg, VA
December 1, 2021*; 7:00 p.m., ESPN+		at Navy	L 56–75	1–7	Alumni Hall (889); Annapolis, MD
December 4, 2021*; 3:00 p.m., ESPN+		at Davidson	L 46–70	1–8	John M. Belk Arena (2,899); Davidson, NC
December 7, 2021*; 7:00 p.m., FloHoops COX		Old Dominion; Rivalry	L 59–74	1–9	Kaplan Arena (2,286); Williamsburg, VA
December 9, 2021*; 7:00 p.m., FloHoops COX		Hampton	L 53–54	1–10	Kaplan Arena (2,007); Williamsburg, VA
December 12, 2021*; 1:00 p.m., FloHoops		Fairfield	L 47–70	1–11	Kaplan Arena (1,673); Williamsburg, VA
December 22, 2021*; 1:00 p.m., ESPN3		at Valparaiso	L 66–88	1–12	Athletics–Recreation Center (2,125); Valparaiso, IN
CAA regular season
December 29, 2021; 7:00 p.m., FloHoops COX		Hofstra	W 63–62	2–12 (1–0)	Kaplan Arena (1,778); Williamsburg, VA
December 31, 2021; 2:00 p.m., FloHoops COX		Northeastern	W 71–70	3–12 (2–0)	Kaplan Arena (1,693); Williamsburg, VA
January 15, 2022; 4:00 p.m., FloHoops COX		James Madison	L 91–95 ^{OT}	3–13 (2–1)	Kaplan Arena (2,496); Williamsburg, VA
January 17, 2022; 7:00 p.m., FloHoops		Towson	L 69–91	3–14 (2–2)	Kaplan Arena (1,783); Williamsburg, VA
January 20, 2022; 7:00 p.m., FloHoops		at Delaware	L 74–84	3–15 (2–3)	Bob Carpenter Center (1,560); Newark, DE
January 22, 2022; 2:00 p.m., FloHoops		at Drexel	W 83–75	4–15 (3–3)	Daskalakis Athletic Center (1,710); Philadelphia, PA
January 25, 2022; 7:00 p.m., FloHoops		at College of Charleston; Rescheduled from January 11	L 73–74	4–16 (3–4)	TD Arena (3,230); Charleston, SC
January 27, 2022; 7:00 p.m., FloHoops		at Elon; Rescheduled from January 5	L 54–61	4–17 (3–5)	Schar Center (1,585); Elon, NC
January 29, 2022; 4:00 p.m., FloHoops COX		Elon	W 65–61	5–17 (4–5)	Kaplan Arena (2,472); Williamsburg, VA
February 3, 2022; 7:00 p.m., FloHoops COX		College of Charleston	L 61–84	5–18 (4–6)	Kaplan Arena (2,352); Williamsburg, VA
February 5, 2022; 4:00 p.m., CBSSN		UNC Wilmington	L 70–92	5–19 (4–7)	Kaplan Arena (3,885); Williamsburg, VA
February 10, 2022; 7:00 p.m., FloHoops		at Towson	L 60–75	5–20 (4–8)	SECU Arena (1,683); Towson, MD
February 12, 2022; 4:00 p.m., FloHoops		at James Madison	L 55–69	5–21 (4–9)	Atlantic Union Bank Center (4,358); Harrisonburg, VA
February 14, 2022; 2:00 p.m., FloHoops		at UNC Wilmington; Rescheduled from January 9	L 73–80 ^{OT}	5–22 (4–10)	Trask Coliseum (3,020); Wilmington, NC
February 17, 2022; 7:00 p.m., FloHoops		Drexel	L 57–72	5–23 (4–11)	Kaplan Arena (2,295); Williamsburg, VA
February 19, 2022; 4:00 p.m., FloHoops COX		Delaware	L 69–73	5–24 (4–12)	Kaplan Arena (3,132); Williamsburg, VA
February 24, 2022; 7:00 p.m., FloHoops		at Northeastern	L 28–62	5–25 (4–13)	Matthews Arena (749); Boston, MA
February 26, 2022; 2:00 p.m., FloHoops		at Hofstra	L 67–83	5–26 (4–14)	Mack Sports Complex (2,247); Hempstead, NY
CAA tournament
March 5, 2022; 4:00 p.m., FloHoops	(8)	vs. (9) Northeastern; First round	L 63–68 ^{OT}	5–27	Entertainment and Sports Arena (2,503); Washington, D.C.
*Non-conference game. ^{#}Rankings from AP poll. (#) Tournament seedings in parentheses. All times are in Eastern.
