= 2021–22 Northeastern Huskies men's basketball team =

American college basketball season

2021–22 Northeastern Huskies men's basketball
- Conference: Colonial Athletic Association
- Record: 9–22 (2–16 CAA)
- Head coach: Bill Coen (16th season)
- Assistant coaches: Brian McDonald; Manny Adako; Joel Smith
- Home arena: Matthews Arena

2021–22 CAA men's basketball standings
| | Conf. | | | | Overall |
| Team | W | | L | PCT | W | | L | PCT |
|---|---|---|---|---|---|---|---|---|
| Towson | 15 | – | 3 | .833 | 25 | – | 9 | .735 |
| UNC Wilmington | 15 | – | 3 | .833 | 27 | – | 9 | .750 |
| Hofstra | 13 | – | 5 | .722 | 21 | – | 11 | .656 |
| Drexel | 10 | – | 8 | .556 | 15 | – | 14 | .517 |
| Delaware † | 10 | – | 8 | .556 | 22 | – | 13 | .629 |
| Charleston | 8 | – | 10 | .444 | 17 | – | 15 | .531 |
| Elon | 7 | – | 11 | .389 | 10 | – | 22 | .313 |
| James Madison* | 6 | – | 12 | .333 | 15 | – | 14 | .517 |
| William & Mary | 4 | – | 14 | .222 | 5 | – | 27 | .156 |
| Northeastern | 2 | – | 16 | .111 | 9 | – | 22 | .290 |
† 2022 CAA tournament winner *Ineligible for conference tournament due to changing conferences in 2022

The 2021–22 Northeastern Huskies men's basketball team represented Northeastern University during the 2021–22 NCAA Division I men's basketball season. The Huskies, led by 16th-year head coach Bill Coen, play their home games at Matthews Arena in Boston, Massachusetts as members of the Colonial Athletic Association.

== Previous season ==
In a season limited due to the ongoing COVID-19 pandemic, the Huskies finished the 2020–21 season 10–9, 8–2 in CAA to finish as conference co-champions with James Madison. They lost in the semifinals of the CAA tournament to Drexel.

== Roster ==
2021–22 Northeastern Huskies men's basketball team
Players
Coaches

| Pos. | # | Name | Height | Weight | Year | Previous school | Hometown |
|---|---|---|---|---|---|---|---|
| F | 00 | Jason Strong | 6 ft 8 in (2.03 m) | 210 lb (95 kg) | RS Sr | Westminster Academy | Coconut Creek, FL |
| G | 1 | Vito Cubrilo | 6 ft 4 in (1.93 m) | 195 lb (88 kg) | Jr | Sports Gymnasium Zagreb | Zagreb, Croatia |
| G | 2 | Glen McClintock | 6 ft 2 in (1.88 m) | 185 lb (84 kg) | So | Rockhurst HS; Air Force | Kansas City, MO |
| G | 10 | Tyreek Scott-Grayson | 6 ft 5 in (1.96 m) | 180 lb (82 kg) | GS | Suffield Academy; UAB | Brick, NJ |
| G | 11 | Jahmyl Telfort | 6 ft 7 in (2.01 m) | 230 lb (104 kg) | So | New Hampton HS | Boucherville, QC |
| F | 12 | Alexander Nwagha | 6 ft 8 in (2.03 m) | 225 lb (102 kg) | So | Orangeville Prep | Milton, ON |
| G | 12 | Nikola Djogo | 6 ft 8 in (2.03 m) | 230 lb (104 kg) | GS | Athlete Institute Prep; Notre Dame | Hamilton, ON |
| F | 15 | Coleman Stucke | 6 ft 7 in (2.01 m) | 215 lb (98 kg) | So | Orangeville Prep | Oakville, ON |
| G | 22 | Quirin Emanga | 6 ft 5 in (1.96 m) | 220 lb (100 kg) | Jr | Otto-Hahn-Gymnasium | Marbach am Neckar, Germany |
| G | 23 | Joe Pridgen | 6 ft 5 in (1.96 m) | 210 lb (95 kg) | Jr | The Governor's Academy; UNC Wilmington | Winchendon, MA |
| G | 24 | Shaquille Walters | 6 ft 6 in (1.98 m) | 200 lb (91 kg) | RS Sr | Lee Academy | London, England |
| F | 32 | Connor Braun | 6 ft 9 in (2.06 m) | 205 lb (93 kg) | RS So | Valley Christian HS | Tempe, AZ |
| F | 33 | Chris Doherty | 6 ft 7 in (2.01 m) | 240 lb (109 kg) | RS Jr | Marlborough HS; Notre Dame | Marlborough, MA |
| G | 55 | To Randriasalama | 6 ft 3 in (1.91 m) | 170 lb (77 kg) | Fr | Collège Jean-de-Brébeuf | Montreal, QC |

Head coach

- Bill Coen (Hamilton College)

Assistant coach(es)

- Brian McDonald (Northeastern)
- Manny Adako (Northeastern)
- Joel Smith (Northeastern)

Legend

- (C) Team captain
- (S) Suspended
- (I) Ineligible
- (W) Walk-on
- Injured
- Current redshirt

Roster
Last update: December 23, 2021

== Schedule and results ==
| Date time, TV | Rank^{#} | Opponent^{#} | Result | Record | Site (attendance) city, state |
Non-conference regular season
| November 9, 2021*; 7:00 pm, NESN/ESPN+ | | at Colgate | L 58–65 | 0–1 | Cotterell Court (1,013); Hamilton, NY |
| November 12, 2021*; 1:00 pm, ESPN+ | | at Georgia State | L 64–83 | 0–2 | GSU Sports Arena (1,008); Atlanta, GA |
| November 16, 2021*; 7:00 pm, NESN | | Boston University | W 49–48 | 1–2 | Matthews Arena (1,699); Boston, MA |
| November 19, 2021*; 5:45 pm, ESPN3 | | vs. Duquesne; Paradise Jam Quarterfinals | W 71–55 | 2–2 | Sports and Fitness Center; Saint Thomas, U.S. Virgin Islands |
| November 21, 2021*; 8:00 pm, ESPN3 | | vs. Southern Illinois; Paradise Jam Semifinals | W 59–47 | 3–2 | Sports and Fitness Center (879); Saint Thomas, U.S. Virgin Islands |
| November 22, 2021*; 8:00 pm, ESPN3 | | vs. Colorado State; Paradise Jam Championship | L 61–71 | 3–3 | Sports and Fitness Center (924); Saint Thomas, U.S. Virgin Islands |
| November 27, 2021*; 5:00 pm, NESN/ESPN+ | | at Harvard | L 57–77 | 3–4 | Lavietes Pavilion (1,183); Boston, MA |
| November 30, 2021*; 7:00 pm, FloHoops | | Detroit Mercy | W 66–56 | 4–4 | Matthews Arena (872); Boston, MA |
| December 3, 2021*; 7:00 pm, FloHoops | | Colgate | W 74–69 | 5–4 | Matthews Arena (912); Boston, MA |
| December 7, 2021*; 7:00 pm, NESN+ | | UMass | W 82–76 | 6–4 | Matthews Arena (1,252); Boston, MA |
| December 12, 2021*; 1:00 pm, FloHoops | | Davidson | L 69–79 | 6–5 | Matthews Arena (1,197); Boston, MA |
| December 19, 2021*; 1:00 pm | | Vermont | Canceled due to COVID-19 protocols | | Matthews Arena; Boston, MA |
| December 22, 2021*; 12:00 pm | | St. Bonaventure | Canceled due to COVID-19 protocols | | Matthews Arena; Boston, MA |
CAA Regular Season
| December 29, 2021; 7:00 pm, FloHoops | | at Elon | L 62–79 | 6–6 (0–1) | Schar Center (1,487); Elon, NC |
| December 31, 2021; 2:00 pm, FloHoops | | at William & Mary | L 70–71 | 6–7 (0–2) | Kaplan Arena (1,693); Williamsburg, VA |
| January 9, 2022; 7:00 pm, FloHoops | | at Towson | L 67–70 | 6–8 (0–3) | SECU Arena (732); Towson, MD |
| January 11, 2022; 7:00 pm, FloHoops | | at James Madison | L 66–89 | 6–9 (0–4) | Atlantic Union Bank Center (2,783); Harrisonburg, VA |
| January 15, 2022; 2:00 pm, NESN+ | | Drexel | L 68–76 | 6–10 (0–5) | Matthews Arena; Boston, MA |
| January 17, 2022; 7:00 pm, CBSSN | | Delaware | L 76–82 ^{OT} | 6–11 (0–6) | Matthews Arena; Boston, MA |
| January 22, 2022; 12:00 pm, FloHoops | | Hofstra | L 50–72 | 6–12 (0–7) | Matthews Arena (0); Boston, MA |
| January 24, 2022; 7:00 pm, NESN+ | | UNC Wilmington; Rescheduled from January 5 | L 68–74 | 6–13 (0–8) | Matthews Arena (564); Boston, MA |
| January 27, 2022; 7:00 pm, FloHoops | | at UNC Wilmington | L 62–67 | 6–14 (0–9) | Trask Coliseum (4,146); Wilmington, NC |
| January 29, 2022; 4:00 pm, FloHoops | | at College of Charleston | L 63-81 | 6–15 (0–10) | TD Arena (4,364); Charleston, SC |
| February 3, 2022; 7:00 pm, FloHoops | | James Madison | L 71-76 | 6–16 (0–11) | Matthews Arena (667); Boston, MA |
| February 5, 2022; 1:00 pm, NESN+ | | Towson | W 58–53 | 7–16 (1–11) | Matthews Arena (817); Boston, MA |
| February 10, 2022; 7:00 pm, FloHoops | | at Delaware | L 61–74 | 7–17 (1–12) | Bob Carpenter Center (2,347); Newark, DE |
| February 12, 2022; 2:00 pm, FloHoops | | at Drexel | L 51–67 | 7–18 (1–13) | Daskalakis Athletic Center (872); Philadelphia, PA |
| February 19, 2022; 2:00 pm, FloHoops | | at Hofstra | L 73–76 | 7–19 (1–14) | Mack Sports Complex (2,556); Hempstead, NY |
| February 22, 2022; 7:00 pm, NESN | | College of Charleston; Rescheduled from January 3 | L 72–83 | 7–20 (1–15) | Matthews Arena (518); Boston, MA |
| February 24, 2022; 6:30 pm, NESN | | William & Mary | W 62–28 | 8–20 (2–15) | Matthews Arena (749); Boston, MA |
| February 26, 2022; 12:00 pm, CBSSN | | Elon | L 54–67 | 8–21 (2–16) | Matthews Arena (1,117); Boston, MA |
CAA tournament
| March 5, 2022; 4:00 pm, FloHoops | (9) | vs. (8) William & Mary; First round | W 68–63 ^{OT} | 9–21 | Entertainment and Sports Arena (2,503); Washington, D.C. |
| March 6, 2022; 12:00 pm, FloHoops | (9) | vs. (1) Towson; Quarterfinals | L 61–68 | 9–22 | Entertainment and Sports Arena (1,811); Washington, D.C. |
*Non-conference game. ^{#}Rankings from AP Poll. (#) Tournament seedings in parentheses. All times are in Eastern.
