= 2021–22 James Madison Dukes men's basketball team =

American college basketball season

2021–22 James Madison Dukes men's basketball
- Conference: Colonial Athletic Association
- Record: 15–14 (6–12 CAA)
- Head coach: Mark Byington (2nd season)
- Assistant coaches: Andrew Wilson; Xavier Joyner; Jon Cremins
- Home arena: Atlantic Union Bank Center

2021–22 CAA men's basketball standings
	Conf.				Overall
Team	W		L	PCT	W		L	PCT
Towson	15	–	3	.833	25	–	9	.735
UNC Wilmington	15	–	3	.833	27	–	9	.750
Hofstra	13	–	5	.722	21	–	11	.656
Drexel	10	–	8	.556	15	–	14	.517
Delaware †	10	–	8	.556	22	–	13	.629
Charleston	8	–	10	.444	17	–	15	.531
Elon	7	–	11	.389	10	–	22	.313
James Madison*	6	–	12	.333	15	–	14	.517
William & Mary	4	–	14	.222	5	–	27	.156
Northeastern	2	–	16	.111	9	–	22	.290
† 2022 CAA tournament winner *Ineligible for conference tournament due to changing conferences in 2022

The 2021–22 James Madison Dukes men's basketball team represented James Madison University in the 2021–22 NCAA Division I men's basketball season. The Dukes, led by second-year head coach Mark Byington, played their home games at the Atlantic Union Bank Center in Harrisonburg, Virginia as members of the Colonial Athletic Association. They finished the season 15–14, 6–12 in CAA play to finish in eighth place.

On November 6, 2021, the school announced that it would leave the CAA to join the Sun Belt Conference effective June 30, 2022. In response, the CAA banned the Dukes from all CAA championships for the remainder of their time in the conference, including the CAA tournament.

== Previous season ==
In a season limited due to the ongoing COVID-19 pandemic, the Dukes finished the 2020–21 season finished the season 13–7, 8–2 in CAA play to earn a share of the regular season championship. They lost in the quarterfinals of the CAA tournament to Elon.

Byington was named the CAA Coach of the Year while guard Matt Lewis was named the CAA Player of the Year.

== Preseason ==
In the conference's preseason poll, the Dukes were picked to finish fourth, but were one of six schools to receive first place votes. Additionally, guard Vado Morse was named to the preseason All-Conference Second Team while guard Takal Molson was an honorable mention.

== Roster ==
2021–22 James Madison Dukes men's basketball team
Players
Coaches

Pos.	#	Name	Height	Weight	Year	Previous school	Hometown
F	0	Justin Amadi	6 ft 7 in (2.01 m)	220 lb (100 kg)	RS Fr	Paul M. Dorman HS	Greenville, SC
G	1	Devon Savage	6 ft 4 in (1.93 m)	190 lb (86 kg)	Fr	Riverdale Baptist School	Washington, D.C.
G	2	Jaylen Stinson	6 ft 0 in (1.83 m)	170 lb (77 kg)	Fr	Archbishop Wood Catholic HS	Philadelphia, PA
G	3	Andrew McConnell	6 ft 0 in (1.83 m)	170 lb (77 kg)	Fr	Lanier HS	Buford, GA
G	4	Vado Morse	6 ft 0 in (1.83 m)	170 lb (77 kg)	RS Jr	Mount St. Mary's	Suitland, MD
G/F	5	Terrence Edwards Jr.	6 ft 6 in (1.98 m)	190 lb (86 kg)	RS Fr	Tucker HS	Atlanta, GA
G	10	Terell Strickland	6 ft 0 in (1.83 m)	170 lb (77 kg)	RS Fr	Scotland Campus Sports	Tampa, FL
G	11	Charles Falden	6 ft 3 in (1.91 m)	210 lb (95 kg)	GS	Winthrop	Richmond, VA
G	13	Jalen Hodge	6 ft 1 in (1.85 m)	180 lb (82 kg)	RS Jr	Louisiana–Monroe	O'Fallon, IL
G	14	Tyree Ihenacho	6 ft 4 in (1.93 m)	195 lb (88 kg)	RS Fr	North Dakota	Prior Lake, MN
G	15	Takal Molson	6 ft 4 in (1.93 m)	210 lb (95 kg)	GS	Seton Hall	Buffalo, NY
G	20	Dylan Hamrick	6 ft 0 in (1.83 m)	170 lb (77 kg)	So	Central HS	Strasburg, VA
G	21	Hollman Smith	6 ft 0 in (1.83 m)	180 lb (82 kg)	RS Fr	Tilton School	Falls Church, VA
F	22	Julien Wooden	6 ft 8 in (2.03 m)	225 lb (102 kg)	RS So	Northside HS	Roanoke, VA
F	25	Alonzo Sule	6 ft 7 in (2.01 m)	215 lb (98 kg)	GS	Texas State	Houston, TX
F	30	Shane Feden	6 ft 6 in (1.98 m)	170 lb (77 kg)	Fr	Woodbridge HS	Woodbridge, VA

Head coach

- Mark Byington (UNC Wilmington)

Assistant coach(es)

- Andrew Wilson (Florida State)
- Xavier Joyner (Husson)
- Jon Cremins (Valdosta State)

Legend

- (C) Team captain
- (S) Suspended
- (I) Ineligible
- (W) Walk-on
- Injured
- Current redshirt

Roster
Last update: January 22, 2022

== Schedule and results ==
Date time, TV	Rank^{#}	Opponent^{#}	Result	Record	Site (attendance) city, state
Non-conference regular season
November 10, 2021*; 7:00 pm		Carlow	W 135–40	1–0	Atlantic Union Bank Center (3,691); Harrisonburg, VA
November 13, 2021*; 4:00 pm		Old Dominion; Rivalry	W 58–53	2–0	Atlantic Union Bank Center (5,011); Harrisonburg, VA
November 16, 2021*; 7:00 pm, ESPN+		at Eastern Kentucky	W 79–78	3–0	Alumni Coliseum (3,791); Richmond, KY
November 19, 2021*; 7:00 pm, NBCSW+/FloHoops		George Mason	W 67–64	4–0	Atlantic Union Bank Center (4,505); Harrisonburg, VA
November 22, 2021*; 12:00 pm, FloHoops		vs. Kent State; Naples Invitational First Round	L 69–74	4–1	Community School of Naples (607); Naples, FL
November 23, 2021*; 12:00 pm, FloHoops		vs. Wright State; Naples Invitational Consolation 2nd Round	W 78–76	5–1	Community School of Naples (337); Naples, FL
November 24, 2021*; 2:30 pm, FloHoops		vs. Murray State; Naples Invitational 5th place game	L 62–74	5–2	Community School of Naples (117); Naples, FL
November 28, 2021*; 2:00 pm		at Florida Atlantic	W 69–65	6–2	FAU Arena (939); Boca Raton, FL
December 2, 2021*; 7:00 pm, FloHoops		Eastern Mennonite	W 96–54	7–2	Atlantic Union Bank Center (3,390); Harrisonburg, VA
December 7, 2021*; 6:30 pm, CBSSN		Virginia	W 52–49	8–2	Atlantic Union Bank Center (8,439); Harrisonburg, VA
December 11, 2021*; 7:00 pm, FloHoops		Radford	W 79–70	9–2	Atlantic Union Bank Center (4,713); Harrisonburg, VA
December 21, 2021*; 6:00 pm		at Morgan State	Canceled due to COVID-19 protocols		Talmadge L. Hill Field House; Baltimore, MD
December 28, 2021*; 2:00 pm, ESPN+		at Penn	Canceled due to COVID-19 protocols		Palestra; Philadelphia, PA
CAA regular season
January 9, 2022; 4:00 pm, FloHoops		Hofstra	L 80–87	9–3 (0–1)	Atlantic Union Bank Center (3,527); Harrisonburg, VA
January 11, 2022; 7:00 pm, NBCSW+/FloHoops		Northeastern	W 89–66	10–3 (1–1)	Atlantic Union Bank Center (2,783); Harrisonburg, VA
January 15, 2022; 4:00 pm, FloHoops		at William & Mary	W 95–91 ^{OT}	11–3 (2–1)	Kaplan Arena (2,496); Williamsburg, VA
January 17, 2022; 4:00 pm, FloHoops		at Elon	L 67–90	11–4 (2–2)	Schar Center (1,684); Elon, NC
January 20, 2022; 7:00 pm, NBCSW/FloHoops		UNC Wilmington	L 70–71	11–5 (2–3)	Atlantic Union Bank Center (3,878); Harrisonburg, VA
January 22, 2022; 4:00 pm, FloHoops		College of Charleston	W 95–94	12–5 (3–3)	Atlantic Union Bank Center (4,721); Harrisonburg, VA
January 27, 2022; 7:00 pm, NBCSW/FloHoops		Drexel	L 82–88	12–6 (3–4)	Atlantic Union Bank Center (3,927); Harrisonburg, VA
January 29, 2022; 4:00 pm, NBCSW/FloHoops		Delaware	L 69–85	12–7 (3–5)	Atlantic Union Bank Center (4,590); Harrisonburg, VA
February 3, 2022; 7:00 pm, FloHoops		at Northeastern	W 76–71	13–7 (4–5)	Matthews Arena (667); Boston, MA
February 5, 2022; 2:00 pm, FloHoops		at Hofstra	L 78–85 ^{OT}	13–8 (4–6)	Mack Sports Complex (3,793); Hempstead, NY
February 7, 2022; 7:00 pm, FloHoops		at Drexel	L 66–72	13–9 (4–7)	Daskalakis Athletic Center (743); Philadelphia, PA
February 10, 2022; 5:00 pm, FloHoops		Elon	L 66–70	13–10 (4–8)	Atlantic Union Bank Center (3,414); Harrisonburg, VA
February 12, 2022; 4:00 pm, NBCSW/FloHoops		William & Mary	W 69–55	14–10 (5–8)	Atlantic Union Bank Center (4,538); Harrisonburg, VA
February 14, 2022; 7:00 pm, FloHoops		at Delaware; Rescheduled from January 3	L 60–81	14–11 (5–9)	Bob Carpenter Center (1,298); Newark, DE
February 17, 2022; 7:00 pm, FloHoops		at College of Charleston	W 71–63	15–11 (6–9)	TD Arena (4,283); Charleston, SC
February 19, 2022; 7:00 pm, FloHoops		at UNC Wilmington	L 77–78 ^{OT}	15–12 (6–10)	Trask Coliseum (5,250); Wilmington, NC
February 23, 2022; 4:00 pm, FloHoops		at Towson; Rescheduled from December 31	L 65–84	15–13 (6–11)	SECU Arena (3,032); Towson, MD
February 26, 2022; 4:00 pm, FloHoops		Towson	L 59–95	15–14 (6–12)	Atlantic Union Bank Center (5,168); Harrisonburg, VA
*Non-conference game. ^{#}Rankings from AP Poll. (#) Tournament seedings in parentheses. All times are in Eastern.
