= 2021–22 Drexel Dragons men's basketball team =

American college basketball season

2021–22 Drexel Dragons men's basketball
- Conference: Colonial Athletic Association
- Record: 15–14 (10–8 CAA)
- Head coach: Zach Spiker (6th season)
- Assistant coaches: Paul Fortier (6th season); Justin Jennings (6th season); Rob O'Driscoll (6th season); Will Chavis (1st season)
- MVP: Camren Wynter
- Captain: Matej Juric
- Home arena: Daskalakis Athletic Center

2021–22 CAA men's basketball standings
	Conf.				Overall
Team	W		L	PCT	W		L	PCT
Towson	15	–	3	.833	25	–	9	.735
UNC Wilmington	15	–	3	.833	27	–	9	.750
Hofstra	13	–	5	.722	21	–	11	.656
Drexel	10	–	8	.556	15	–	14	.517
Delaware †	10	–	8	.556	22	–	13	.629
Charleston	8	–	10	.444	17	–	15	.531
Elon	7	–	11	.389	10	–	22	.313
James Madison*	6	–	12	.333	15	–	14	.517
William & Mary	4	–	14	.222	5	–	27	.156
Northeastern	2	–	16	.111	9	–	22	.290
† 2022 CAA tournament winner *Ineligible for conference tournament due to changing conferences in 2022

The 2021–22 Drexel Dragons men's basketball team represented Drexel University during the 2021–22 NCAA Division I men's basketball season. The Dragons, led by sixth-year head coach Zach Spiker, played their home games at the Daskalakis Athletic Center in Philadelphia, Pennsylvania as members of the Colonial Athletic Association (CAA).

== Previous season ==
In a season limited due to the ongoing COVID-19 pandemic, the Dragons finished the 2020–21 season 14–18, 4–5 in CAA play, to finish in 6th place. They defeated Charleston, Northeastern and Elon to win the CAA tournament championship. As a result, they received the conference's automatic bid to the NCAA tournament as the No. 16 seed in the Midwest region. There they lost to No. 1-seeded Illinois.

== Offseason ==
=== Departures ===
Name	Number	Pos.	Height	Weight	Year	Hometown	Notes
Zach Walton	5	F	6'6"	205	RS Senior	Morton, WA	Graduated
Anto Keshgegian	12	G	6'3"	185	RS Senior	Media, PA	Graduated
Tim Perry Jr.	13	F	6'10"	230	RS Junior	Cherry Hill, NJ	Left team
Julian Adams	20	G	6'1"	175	RS Senior	York, PA	Graduated
T.J. Bickerstaff	23	F	6'9"	207	Sophomore	Atlanta, GA	Transferred to Boston College
Tadas Kararinas	32	C	6'10"	210	Senior	Šilutė, Lithuania	Signed to BC Kuršiai
Chuka Mekkam	55	C	6'1"	185	Junior	Portland, OR	Left team; transferred to Neumann

=== Incoming transfers ===
College recruiting information
Name	Hometown	School	Height	Weight	Commit date
Trevion Brown; PG	Tacoma, WA	Colorado State–Pueblo	6 ft 2 in (1.88 m)	175 lb (79 kg)	Mar 30, 2021
Trevion Brown; PG	Recruit ratings: No ratings found				
Melik Martin; SF	York, PA	Monmouth	6 ft 6 in (1.98 m)	200 lb (91 kg)	Apr 20, 2021
Melik Martin; SF	Recruit ratings: No ratings found				
Overall recruit ranking:
Note: In many cases, Scout, Rivals, 247Sports, On3, and ESPN may conflict in their listings of height and weight.; In these cases, the average was taken. ESPN grades are on a 100-point scale.; Sources: "Drexel 2021 Basketball Commitments". Rivals.; "Drexel Dragons". ESPN.; "2021 Team Ranking". Rivals.

=== Recruiting classes ===
==== 2021 recruiting class ====
College recruiting information
Name	Hometown	School	Height	Weight	Commit date
Terrence Butler Jr. SF	Upper Marlboro, MD	Bishop McNamara High School	6 ft 6 in (1.98 m)	210 lb (95 kg)	Jul 20, 2020
Terrence Butler Jr. SF	Recruit ratings: No ratings found				
Ata Can Atsüren; PG	Turkey	Tofaş S.K.	6 ft 2 in (1.88 m)	N/A	Aug 15, 2021
Ata Can Atsüren; PG	Recruit ratings: No ratings found				
Overall recruit ranking:
Note: In many cases, Scout, Rivals, 247Sports, On3, and ESPN may conflict in their listings of height and weight.; In these cases, the average was taken. ESPN grades are on a 100-point scale.; Sources: "Drexel 2021 Basketball Commitments". Rivals.; "Drexel Dragons". ESPN.; "2021 Team Ranking". Rivals.

==== 2022 recruiting class early commitments ====
College recruiting information (2022)
Name	Hometown	School	Height	Weight	Commit date
Kobe Magee; SG	[[Allentown, PA]]	Executive Education Academy Charter School	6 ft 5 in (1.96 m)	N/A	Jun 23, 2021
Kobe Magee; SG	Recruit ratings: No ratings found				
Justin Moore; PG	Wyncote, PA	Archbishop Wood	6 ft 3 in (1.91 m)	170 lb (77 kg)	Sep 28, 2021
Justin Moore; PG	Recruit ratings: No ratings found				
Shane Blakeney; PG	Rock Hill, SC	Legion Collegiate Academy	6 ft 4 in (1.93 m)	170 lb (77 kg)	Oct 1, 2021
Shane Blakeney; PG	Recruit ratings: No ratings found				
Overall recruit ranking:
Note: In many cases, Scout, Rivals, 247Sports, On3, and ESPN may conflict in their listings of height and weight.; In these cases, the average was taken. ESPN grades are on a 100-point scale.; Sources: "Drexel 2022 Basketball Commitments". Rivals.; "Drexel Dragons". ESPN.; "2022 Team Ranking". Rivals.

== Preseason ==
In a poll of the league coaches, media relations directors, and media members at the CAA's media day, Drexel was picked to finish in third place in the CAA. Graduate student James Butler and senior guard Camren Wynter were selected to the Preseason CAA All-Conference First Team. Camren Wynter was also selected as the Preseason CAA Player of the Year.

== Roster ==
2021–22 Drexel Dragons men's basketball team
Players
Coaches

Pos.	#	Name	Height	Weight	Year	Previous school	Hometown
G	0	Coletrane Washington	6 ft 4 in (1.93 m)	183 lb (83 kg)	RS Jr	Quaker Valley HS	Sewickley, PA
G/F	1	Lamar Jr. Oden	6 ft 6 in (1.98 m)	211 lb (96 kg)	So	Greenforest McCalep	Atlanta, GA
G/F	2	Melik Martin	6 ft 6 in (1.98 m)	220 lb (100 kg)	RS Sr	York Catholic HS/Monmouth	York, PA
G	3	Trevion Brown	6 ft 2 in (1.88 m)	173 lb (78 kg)	RS Jr	Gateway Legacy/Colorado State–Pueblo	Tacoma, WA
G	4	Xavier Bell	6 ft 3 in (1.91 m)	185 lb (84 kg)	So	Andover Central HS	Wichita, KS
G	11	Camren Wynter	6 ft 2 in (1.88 m)	185 lb (84 kg)	Sr	Holy Trinity HS/DME Academy	Hempstead, NY
G	12	Dean Wang (W)	6 ft 1 in (1.85 m)	185 lb (84 kg)	So	Friends Select School	Philadelphia, PA
F	14	Luke House	6 ft 4 in (1.93 m)	215 lb (98 kg)	Jr	Archbishop John Carroll HS/Cal (PA)	Norristown, PA
G	15	Matej Juric (C)	5 ft 11 in (1.8 m)	190 lb (86 kg)	Sr	Lake Forest Academy/Oakwood	Toronto, ON
F	21	Mate Okros	6 ft 6 in (1.98 m)	209 lb (95 kg)	Jr	Myerscough College	Debrecen, Hungary
C	22	Amari Williams	6 ft 10 in (2.08 m)	250 lb (113 kg)	So	Myerscough	Nottingham, United Kingdom
G	23	Ata Can Atsüren	6 ft 3 in (1.91 m)	192 lb (87 kg)	Fr	Özlüce Doğa Koleji/Tofaş S.K.	Nilüfer, Turkey
F	24	Terrence Jr. Butler (redshirt)	6 ft 7 in (2.01 m)	230 lb (104 kg)	Fr	Bishop McNamara HS	Upper Marlboro, MD
F	51	James Butler (6th-year Sr)	6 ft 8 in (2.03 m)	235 lb (107 kg)	RS Sr	Lake Braddock/Navy	Fairfax Station, VA

Head coach

- Zach Spiker (Ithaca)

Assistant coach(es)

- Paul Fortier (Washington)
- Justin Jennings (Penn State Behrend)
- Rob O'Driscoll (Villanova)
- Will Chavis (Texas Tech)

Legend

- (C) Team captain
- (S) Suspended
- (I) Ineligible
- (W) Walk-on
- Injured
- Current redshirt

Roster
Last update: 8 November 2021

== Schedule and results ==
The Dragons' November 12, 2021 game against Fairleigh Dickinson was postponed due to travel issues. The game was rescheduled for December 2.

Date time, TV	Rank^{#}	Opponent^{#}	Result	Record	High points	High rebounds	High assists	Site (attendance) city, state
Non-conference regular season
November 9, 2021*; 8:00 p.m.		Neumann	W 103–74	1–0	16 – J. Butler	7 – Williams	8 – Wynter	Daskalakis Athletic Center (1,846); Philadelphia, PA
November 14, 2021*; 5:00 p.m., ESPN2		Syracuse	L 60–75	1–1	16 – Okros	5 – Williams	4 – Brown	Carrier Dome (20,841); Syracuse, NY
November 17, 2021*; 7:00 p.m., ESPN+		at Saint Joseph's	W 78–75	2–1	23 – J. Butler	11 – J. Butler	6 – Wynter	Hagan Arena (1,669); Philadelphia, PA
November 22, 2021*; 2:30 p.m., FloHoops		vs. Tulane; Nassau Championship quarterfinal	L 87–90 ^{OT}	2–2	27 – Martin	10 – J. Butler	4 – Bell	Baha Mar Convention Center; Nassau, Bahamas
November 23, 2021*; 2:30 p.m., FloHoops		vs. Charlotte; Nassau Championship consolation	W 67–55	3–2	20 – Wynter	16 – J. Butler	5 – Wynter	Baha Mar Convention Center; Nassau, Bahamas
November 24, 2021*; 2:30 p.m., FloHoops		vs. Jacksonville State; Nassau Championship 5th-place game	L 64–72	3–3	14 – tied	8 – J. Butler	4 – Wynter	Baha Mar Convention Center; Nassau, Bahamas
December 2, 2021*; 7:00 p.m.		Fairleigh Dickinson; Rescheduled from November 12	W 86–65	4–3	25 – J. Butler	14 – J. Butler	6 – Wynter	Daskalakis Athletic Center (852); Philadelphia, PA
December 4, 2021*; 4:00 p.m., ESPN+		at Princeton	L 79–81 ^{OT}	4–4	18 – Wynter	12 – J. Butler	3 – Okros	Jadwin Gymnasium (1,312); Princeton, NJ
December 11, 2021*; 7:00 p.m., ESPN+		at Abilene Christian	L 56–73	4–5	12 – Oden Jr.	13 – J. Butler	2 – J. Butler	Teague Center (603); Abilene, TX
December 14, 2021*; 8:00 p.m.		Coppin State	W 76–69	5–5	15 – Oden Jr.	11 – J. Butler	6 – Wynter	Daskalakis Athletic Center (1,155); Philadelphia, PA
December 18, 2021*; 2:00 p.m., ESPN+		at Temple	Canceled due to COVID-19 protocols		Liacouras Center; Philadelphia, PA			
December 21, 2021*; 4:00 p.m., ESPN+		at La Salle	Canceled due to COVID-19 protocols		Tom Gola Arena; Philadelphia, PA			
CAA regular season
January 3, 2022; 6:00 p.m., CBSSN		Towson	W 65–61	6–5 (1–0)	15 – Okros	5 – 3 tied	7 – Wynter	Daskalakis Athletic Center (624); Philadelphia, PA
January 11, 2022; 7:00 p.m., NBCSPHI+		Delaware	L 77–81	6–6 (1–1)	18 – Bell	7 – tied	5 – Wynter	Daskalakis Athletic Center (857); Philadelphia, PA
January 15, 2022; 2:00 p.m.		at Northeastern	W 76–68	7–6 (2–1)	26 – Wynter	10 – Willilams	9 – Wynter	Matthews Arena (0); Boston, MA
January 17, 2022; 2:00 p.m.		at Hofstra	L 68–71	7–7 (2–2)	30 – Bell	7 – Williams	5 – Bell	Mack Sports Complex (1,106); Hempstead, NY
January 20, 2022; 7:00 p.m., NBCSPHI+		Elon	W 77–49	8–7 (3–2)	17 – tied	6 – Martin	3 – tied	Daskalakis Athletic Center (788); Philadelphia, PA
January 22, 2022; 2:00 p.m.		William & Mary	L 75–83	8–8 (3–3)	26 – Wynter	9 – tied	6 – Wynter	Daskalakis Athletic Center (1,710); Philadelphia, PA
January 27, 2022; 7:00 p.m.		at James Madison	W 88–82	9–8 (4–3)	21 – Williams	12 – Williams	6 – Wynter	Atlantic Union Bank Center (3,927); Harrisonburg, VA
January 29, 2022; 2:00 p.m.		at Towson	L 62–66	9–9 (4–4)	20 – Wynter	8 – Williams	3 – Wynter	SECU Arena (1,587); Towson, MD
January 31, 2022; 7:00 p.m.		at UNC Wilmington; Rescheduled from December 31	L 63–70	9–10 (4–5)	14 – Washington	8 – Butler	3 – Wynter	Trask Coliseum (4,310); Wilmington, NC
February 3, 2022; 6:00 p.m., CBSSN		at Delaware	W 76–68	10–10 (5–5)	21 – Martin	10 – Williams	5 – Wynter	Bob Carpenter Center (2,844); Newark, DE
February 7, 2022; 7:00 p.m., NBCSPHI+		James Madison; Rescheduled from January 5	W 72–66	11–10 (6–5)	27 – Wynter	13 – Williams	6 – Wynter	Daskalakis Athletic Center (743); Philadelphia, PA
February 10, 2022; 7:00 p.m., NBCSPHI+		Hofstra	L 73–83	11–11 (6–6)	19 – Williams	6 – Martin	4 – Wynter	Daskalakis Athletic Center (838); Philadelphia, PA
February 12, 2022; 2:00 p.m.		Northeastern	W 67–51	12–11 (7–6)	22 – Bell	7 – Wynter	7 – Wynter	Daskalakis Athletic Center (872); Philadelphia, PA
February 14, 2022; 7:00 p.m.		at Charleston; Rescheduled from December 29	L 75–79	12–12 (7–7)	21 – Washington	11 – Williams	8 – Wynter	TD Arena (3,516); Charleston, SC
February 17, 2022; 7:00 p.m.		at William & Mary	W 72–57	13–12 (8–7)	14 – Wynter	9 – Butler	3 – tied	Kaplan Arena (2,295); Williamsburg, VA
February 19, 2022; 4:00 p.m.		at Elon	W 71–60	14–12 (9–7)	12 – Martin	8 – Williams	4 – Wynter	Schar Center (2,456); Elon, NC
February 24, 2022; 7:00 p.m., NBCSPHI		UNC Wilmington	L 63–69	14–13 (9–8)	20 – Williams	19 – Williams	4 – Wynter	Daskalakis Athletic Center (690); Philadelphia, PA
February 26, 2022; 4:00 p.m., NBCSPHI		Charleston	W 80–79	15–13 (10–8)	18 – Wynter	11 – Williams	5 – Wynter	Daskalakis Athletic Center (1,184); Philadelphia, PA
CAA tournament
March 6, 2022; 2:30 p.m.	(4)	vs. (5) Delaware; Quarterfinal	L 56–66	15–14	28 – Wynter	10 – Martin	2 – Butler	Entertainment and Sports Arena (1,811); Washington, D.C.
*Non-conference game. ^{#}Rankings from AP poll. (#) Tournament seedings in parentheses. All times are in Eastern.

== Awards ==
James Butler

- Preseason CAA All-Conference First Team
- "Sweep" Award (team leader in rebounds)

Luke House

- Donald Shank Spirit & Dedication Award

Matej Juric

- CAA Dean Ehlers Leadership Award
- Team Academic Award

Melik Martin

- City of Basketball Love All–City 6 Second Team

Amari Williams

- CAA Defensive Player of the Year
- CAA All-Conference Third Team
- CAA All-Defensive Team
- City of Basketball Love Most Improved Player
- CAA Player of the Week
- Dragon "D" Award (team's top defensive player)
- Samuel D. Cozen Award (team's most improved player)

Camren Wynter

- CAA All-Conference First Team
- City of Basketball Love All–City 6 First Team
- Preseason CAA Player of the Year
- Preseason CAA All-Conference First Team
- Team Most Valuable Player
- Assist Award (team leader in assists)

== See also ==
- 2021–22 Drexel Dragons women's basketball team
