= 2021–22 Towson Tigers men's basketball team =

American college basketball season

2021–22 Towson Tigers men's basketball

CAA regular season co-champions

NIT, First Round
- Conference: Colonial Athletic Association
- Record: 25–9 (15–3 CAA)
- Head coach: Pat Skerry (11th season)
- Assistant coaches: Kevin Clark; Pat O'Connell; Parfait Bitee
- Home arena: SECU Arena

2021–22 CAA men's basketball standings
	Conf.				Overall
Team	W		L	PCT	W		L	PCT
Towson	15	–	3	.833	25	–	9	.735
UNC Wilmington	15	–	3	.833	27	–	9	.750
Hofstra	13	–	5	.722	21	–	11	.656
Drexel	10	–	8	.556	15	–	14	.517
Delaware †	10	–	8	.556	22	–	13	.629
Charleston	8	–	10	.444	17	–	15	.531
Elon	7	–	11	.389	10	–	22	.313
James Madison*	6	–	12	.333	15	–	14	.517
William & Mary	4	–	14	.222	5	–	27	.156
Northeastern	2	–	16	.111	9	–	22	.290
† 2022 CAA tournament winner *Ineligible for conference tournament due to changing conferences in 2022

The 2021–22 Towson Tigers men's basketball team represented Towson University during the 2021–22 NCAA Division I men's basketball season. The Tigers, led by 11th-year head coach Pat Skerry, played their home games at the SECU Arena in Towson, Maryland as members of the Colonial Athletic Association. The Tigers finished the 2021–22 season 25–9, 15–3 in CAA play to finish as CAA regular season co-champions, alongside UNC Wilmington. As the top seed in the CAA tournament, they defeated Northeastern in the quarterfinals, before being upset by No. 5 seed Delaware in the semifinals. As a regular season champion, who failed to win their league tournament, the Tigers earned an automatic bid to the NIT, where they lost in the first round to Wake Forest.

== Previous season ==
The Tigers finished the 2020–21 season 4–14, 3–9 in CAA play to finish in ninth place. They lost in the first round of the CAA tournament to Elon.

== Roster ==
2021–22 Towson Tigers men's basketball team
Players
Coaches

Pos.	#	Name	Height	Weight	Year	Previous school	Hometown
G	0	Antonio Rizzuto	6 ft 3 in (1.91 m)	210 lb (95 kg)	Sr	Albany	York, PA
G	1	Terry Nolan Jr.	6 ft 4 in (1.93 m)	200 lb (91 kg)	GS	Bradley	Baltimore, MD
G	2	Tyler Gill	5 ft 11 in (1.8 m)	170 lb (77 kg)	Fr	Trinity Academy	Raleigh, NC
F	3	Tyler Coleman	6 ft 7 in (2.01 m)	230 lb (104 kg)	Fr	Paul VI HS	Woodbridge, VA
G	10	Rahdir Hicks	6 ft 0 in (1.83 m)	160 lb (73 kg)	Fr	Malvern Prep	Coatesville, PA
G	11	Jason Gibson	6 ft 1 in (1.85 m)	175 lb (79 kg)	Jr	Sidwell Friends School	Severna Park, MD
F	12	Juwan Gray	6 ft 8 in (2.03 m)	225 lb (102 kg)	GS	San Diego	Dover, DE
F	13	Chase Paar	6 ft 10 in (2.08 m)	250 lb (113 kg)	Jr	George Washington	Mount Airy, MD
G	15	Chris Caliguiran	5 ft 6 in (1.68 m)	140 lb (64 kg)	Sr	Washington Academy	Accokeek, MD
G	23	Darrick Jones Jr.	6 ft 5 in (1.96 m)	200 lb (91 kg)	So	Oak Hill Academy	Richmond, VA
G	25	Nicolas Timberlake	6 ft 4 in (1.93 m)	200 lb (91 kg)	RS Jr	Kimball Union Academy	Braintree, MA
F	32	Charles Thompson	6 ft 7 in (2.01 m)	240 lb (109 kg)	Jr	St. Stephen's & St. Agnes School	Fort Washington, MD
G	33	Brandon Held	6 ft 3 in (1.91 m)	185 lb (84 kg)	RS Fr	Marriotts Ridge HS	Marriottsville, MD
F	35	Chris Biekeu	6 ft 7 in (2.01 m)	235 lb (107 kg)	So	Vanier College	Montreal, Quebec, Canada
G	44	Justin Patterson	6 ft 4 in (1.93 m)	215 lb (98 kg)	RS Jr	Landon School	Bowie, MD
G	45	Olugbemi Joseph	6 ft 4 in (1.93 m)	200 lb (91 kg)	RS Fr	Bowie HS	Bowie, MD
G	55	Cam Holden	6 ft 5 in (1.96 m)	200 lb (91 kg)	Sr	UT Martin	Forsyth, GA

Head coach

- Pat Skerry (Tufts)

Assistant coach(es)

- Kevin Clark (Clark)
- Pat O'Connell (Johns Hopkins)
- Parfait Bitee (Rhode Island)

Legend

- (C) Team captain
- (S) Suspended
- (I) Ineligible
- (W) Walk-on
- Injured
- Current redshirt

Roster
Last update: January 21, 2022

== Schedule and results ==
Date time, TV	Rank^{#}	Opponent^{#}	Result	Record	Site (attendance) city, state
Non-conference regular season
November 9, 2021*; 7:00 pm, ESPN3		at Albany	W 77–56	1–0	SEFCU Arena (4,215); Guilderland, NY
November 13, 2021*; 7:00 pm, FloHoops		Monmouth	L 71–79	1–1	SECU Arena (2,040); Towson, MD
November 16, 2021*; 7:00 pm, FloHoops		Hampton	W 78–54	2–1	SECU Arena (1,742); Towson, MD
November 19, 2021*; 6:00 pm, ACCN		at Pittsburgh	L 59–63	2–2	Petersen Events Center (7,612); Pittsburgh, PA
November 23, 2021*; 2:00 pm, FloHoops		Penn	W 76–61	3–2	SECU Arena (1,121); Towson, MD
November 25, 2021*; 9:30 pm, FS1		vs. San Francisco; Las Vegas Invitational Semifinals	L 61–71	3–3	Orleans Arena; Paradise, NV
November 26, 2021*; 9:00 pm, FS2		vs. New Mexico; Las Vegas Invitational Consolation	W 73–58	4–3	Orleans Arena; Paradise, NV
December 2, 2021*; 7:00 pm, FloHoops		LIU	W 72–63	5–3	SECU Arena (1,357); Towson, MD
December 6, 2021*; 7:00 pm, ESPN3		at Kent State	W 73–58	6–3	MAC Center (1,397); Kent, OH
December 8, 2021*; 9:00 pm, ESPNU		at Ohio State	L 74–85	6–4	Value City Arena (9,472); Columbus, OH
December 11, 2021*; 3:00 pm		at Coppin State	W 89-75	7–4	Physical Education Complex (400); Baltimore, MD
December 14, 2021*; 7:00 pm, FloHoops		UNC Greensboro	W 74–64	8–4	SECU Arena (1,565); Towson, MD
December 22, 2021*; 1:00 pm, ESPN+		at Navy	W 69–52	9–4	Alumni Hall (789); Annapolis, MD
CAA regular season
December 31, 2021; 2:00 pm, FloHoops		James Madison	Postponed due to COVID-19 protocols at James Madison		SECU Arena; Towson, MD
January 3, 2022; 6:00 pm, CBSSN		at Drexel	L 61–65	9–5 (0–1)	Daskalakis Athletic Center (624); Philadelphia, PA
January 5, 2022; 7:00 pm, FloHoops		at Delaware	Postponed due to COVID-19 protocols at Delaware		Bob Carpenter Center; Newark, DE
January 9, 2022; 4:30 pm, FloHoops		Northeastern	W 70–67	10–5 (1–1)	SECU Arena (732); Towson, MD
January 11, 2022; 5:00 pm, CBSSN		Hofstra	W 78–66	11–5 (2–1)	SECU Arena (918); Towson, MD
January 15, 2022; 4:00 pm, FloHoops		at Elon	W 59–54	12–5 (3–1)	Schar Center (1,821); Elon, NC
January 17, 2022; 7:00 pm, FloHoops		at William & Mary	W 91–69	13–5 (4–1)	Kaplan Arena (1,783); Williamsburg, VA
January 20, 2022; 7:00 pm, FloHoops		College of Charleston	W 74–67	14–5 (5–1)	SECU Arena (968); Towson, MD
January 22, 2022; 2:00 pm, FloHoops		UNC Wilmington	L 77–81	14–6 (5–2)	SECU Arena (1,273); Towson, MD
January 24, 2022; 7:00 pm, FloHoops		at Delaware; Rescheduled from January 5	W 69–62	15–6 (6–2)	Bob Carpenter Center (1,574); Newark, DE
January 27, 2022; 7:00 pm, FloHoops		Delaware	Suspended at halftime with Delaware leading 38–29 due to unsafe court conditions.		SECU Arena; Towson, MD
January 29, 2022; 2:00 pm, FloHoops		Drexel	W 66-62	16-6 (7-2)	SECU Arena (1,587); Towson, MD
February 3, 2022; 7:00 pm, FloHoops		at Hofstra	W 78–68	16–7 (8–2)	Mack Sports Complex (1,398); Hempstead, NY
February 5, 2022; 4:00 pm, FloHoops		at Northeastern	L 53–58	17–7 (8–3)	Matthews Arena (817); Boston, MA
February 10, 2022; 7:00 pm, FloHoops		William & Mary	W 75–60	18–7 (9–3)	SECU Arena (1,683); Towson, MD
February 12, 2022; 2:00 pm, FloHoops		Elon	W 86–50	19–7 (10–3)	SECU Arena (1,832); Towson, MD
February 17, 2022; 7:00 pm, FloHoops		at UNC Wilmington	W 79–55	20–7 (11–3)	Trask Coliseum (4,411); Wilmington, NC
February 19, 2022; 4:00 pm, FloHoops		at College of Charleston	W 80–77	21–7 (12–3)	TD Arena (5,060); Charleston, SC
February 23, 2022; 7:00 pm, FloHoops		James Madison; Rescheduled from December 31	W 84–65	22–7 (13–3)	SECU Arena (3,032); Towson, MD
February 26, 2022; 4:00 pm, FloHoops		at James Madison	W 95–59	23–7 (14–3)	Atlantic Union Bank Center (5,168); Harrisonburg, VA
February 28, 2022; 6:00 pm, FloHoops		Delaware; Resumption from January 27	W 69–57	24–7 (15–3)	SECU Arena (2,451); Towson, MD
CAA tournament
March 6, 2022; 12:00 pm, FloHoops	(1)	vs. (9) Northeastern; Quarterfinals	W 68–61	25–7	Entertainment and Sports Arena (1,811); Washington, D.C.
March 7, 2022; 6:00 pm, CBSSN	(1)	vs. (5) Delaware; Semifinals	L 56–69	25–8	Entertainment and Sports Arena (1,707); Washington, D.C.
NIT
March 16, 2022; 7:00 pm, ESPN+		at (2) Wake Forest; First Round – Texas A&M Bracket	L 64–74	25–9	LJVM Coliseum; Winston-Salem, NC
*Non-conference game. ^{#}Rankings from AP. (#) Tournament seedings in parentheses. All times are in Eastern Time.
