= 2021–22 Delaware Fightin' Blue Hens men's basketball team =

American college basketball season

2021–22 Delaware Fightin' Blue Hens men's basketball

CAA tournament champions

NCAA tournament, First Round
- Conference: Colonial Athletic Association
- Record: 22–13 (10–8 CAA)
- Head coach: Martin Ingelsby (6th season)
- Assistant coaches: Bill Phillips; Corey McCrae; Torrian Jones
- Home arena: Bob Carpenter Center

2021–22 CAA men's basketball standings
	Conf.				Overall
Team	W		L	PCT	W		L	PCT
Towson	15	–	3	.833	25	–	9	.735
UNC Wilmington	15	–	3	.833	27	–	9	.750
Hofstra	13	–	5	.722	21	–	11	.656
Drexel	10	–	8	.556	15	–	14	.517
Delaware †	10	–	8	.556	22	–	13	.629
Charleston	8	–	10	.444	17	–	15	.531
Elon	7	–	11	.389	10	–	22	.313
James Madison*	6	–	12	.333	15	–	14	.517
William & Mary	4	–	14	.222	5	–	27	.156
Northeastern	2	–	16	.111	9	–	22	.290
† 2022 CAA tournament winner *Ineligible for conference tournament due to changing conferences in 2022

The 2021–22 Delaware Fightin' Blue Hens men's basketball team represented the University of Delaware in the 2021–22 NCAA Division I men's basketball season. The Fightin' Blue Hens, led by sixth-year head coach Martin Ingelsby, played their home games at the Bob Carpenter Center in Newark, Delaware as members of the Colonial Athletic Association. They finished the season 22–13, 10–8 in CAA Play to finish a tie for fourth place. As the No. 5 seed, they defeated Drexel, Towson, and UNC Wilmington to win the CAA tournament. They received the conference’s automatic bid to the NCAA tournament as the No. 15 seed in the South Region, where they lost in the first round to Villanova.

== Previous season ==
The Fightin' Blue Hens finished the 2020–21 season 7–8, 5–4 in CAA play to finish in fifth place. They lost to Hofstra in the quarterfinals of the CAA tournament.

== Roster ==
2021–22 Delaware Fightin' Blue Hens men's basketball team
Players
Coaches

Pos.	#	Name	Height	Weight	Year	Previous school	Hometown
G	0	Jameer Nelson Jr.	6 ft 1 in (1.85 m)	200 lb (91 kg)	Jr	George Washington	Haverford, PA
G	1	Kevin Anderson	6 ft 5 in (1.96 m)	205 lb (93 kg)	Sr	St. John Neumann HS	Williamsport, PA
G	2	Ryan Allen	6 ft 2 in (1.88 m)	200 lb (91 kg)	Sr	DeMatha Catholic HS	Bowie, MD
G	3	Logan Curtis	6 ft 3 in (1.91 m)	185 lb (84 kg)	RS So	East Carolina	Baltimore, MD
G	4	Gianmarco Arletti	6 ft 6 in (1.98 m)	205 lb (93 kg)	So	Holy Cross Prep	Bologna, Italy
G	5	Reggie Gardner	6 ft 3 in (1.91 m)	175 lb (79 kg)	RS Sr	North Carolina Central	Bowie, MD
G	10	Johnny McCoy	6 ft 5 in (1.96 m)	190 lb (86 kg)	Jr	Tilton School	Mansfield, MA
G	11	Fred Rullo IV	5 ft 11 in (1.8 m)	165 lb (75 kg)	Jr	Devon Prep	Newtown Square, PA
F	13	Jyáre Davis	6 ft 7 in (2.01 m)	215 lb (98 kg)	RS Fr	Providence	Newark, DE
G	14	Ebby Asamoah	6 ft 4 in (1.93 m)	200 lb (91 kg)	Jr	Magruder HS	Rockville, MD
F	15	Aleks Novakovich	6 ft 9 in (2.06 m)	230 lb (104 kg)	RS Jr	Don Bosco Institute	Hobart, IN
F	21	Andrew Carr	6 ft 9 in (2.06 m)	220 lb (100 kg)	So	West Chester East HS	West Chester, PA
G	23	Davis Long	6 ft 2 in (1.88 m)	185 lb (84 kg)	Sr	Sherwood HS	Brookeville, MD
G	24	Wes Peterson	6 ft 6 in (1.98 m)	180 lb (82 kg)	Fr	Bishop O'Connell HS	Arlington, VA
F	32	Anthony Ochefu	6 ft 8 in (2.03 m)	240 lb (109 kg)	Sr	Stony Brook	West Chester, PA
F	34	O.D. Ogunbo	6 ft 8 in (2.03 m)	205 lb (93 kg)	So	Delcastle HS	Lagos, Nigeria
F	42	Dylan Painter	6 ft 10 in (2.08 m)	235 lb (107 kg)	GS	Villanova	Hershey, PA

Head coach

- Martin Ingelsby (Notre Dame)

Assistant coach(es)

- Bill Phillips (Saint Joseph's)
- Corey McCrae (Fordham)
- Torrian Jones (Notre Dame)

Legend

- (C) Team captain
- (S) Suspended
- (I) Ineligible
- (W) Walk-on
- Injured
- Current redshirt

Roster
Last update: January 21, 2022

== Schedule and results ==
Date time, TV	Rank^{#}	Opponent^{#}	Result	Record	Site (attendance) city, state
Non-conference regular season
November 9, 2021*; 7:00 pm, ESPN+		at Davidson	L 71–93	0–1	John M. Belk Arena (2,779); Davidson, NC
November 13, 2021*; 7:00 pm, ESPN+		at Siena	W 83–63	1–1	Times Union Center (5,842); Albany, NY
November 17, 2021*; 7:00 pm, FloHoops		La Salle	W 85–82 ^{OT}	2–1	Bob Carpenter Center (2,032); Newark, DE
November 22, 2021*; 7:30 pm, FloHoops		vs. Appalachian State; Gulf Coast Showcase	W 75–68	3–1	Hertz Arena (386); Estero, FL
November 23, 2021*; 7:30 pm, FloHoops		vs. Fordham; Gulf Coast Showcase	W 81–71	4–1	Hertz Arena (393); Estero, FL
November 24, 2021*; 7:30 pm, FloHoops		vs. Oakland; Gulf Coast Showcase	L 73–81	4–2	Hertz Arena (237); Estero, FL
November 27, 2021*; 7:00 pm, ESPN+		at Temple	L 74–75	4–3	Liacouras Center (3,979); Philadelphia, PA
November 30, 2021*; 7:00 pm, FloHoops		LIU	W 75–67	5–3	Bob Carpenter Center (1,451); Newark, DE
December 2, 2021*; 7:00 pm		at Delaware State; Route 1 Rivalry	W 59–48	6–3	Memorial Hall (1,200); Dover, DE
December 5, 2021*; 2:00 pm, FloHoops		UMBC	W 70–60	7–3	Bob Carpenter Center (1,434); Newark, DE
December 8, 2021*; 7:00 pm, FloHoops		Lafayette	W 68–58	8–3	Bob Carpenter Center (1,636); Newark, DE
December 10, 2021*; 7:00 pm, FloHoops		Moravian	W 94–55	9–3	Bob Carpenter Center (1,396); Newark, DE
December 21, 2021*; 7:30 pm		vs. Iona	L 72–83	9–4	UBS Arena (823); Elmont, NY
CAA regular season
December 29, 2021; 7:00 pm, FloHoops		at UNC Wilmington	L 68–70	9–5 (0–1)	Trask Coliseum (2,959); Wilmington, NC
December 31, 2021; 2:00 pm, FloHoops		at College of Charleston	W 67–66	10–5 (1–1)	TD Arena (3,394); Charleston, SC
January 11, 2022; 7:00 pm, NBCSPHI		at Drexel	W 81–77	11–5 (2–1)	Daskalakis Athletic Center (857); Philadelphia, PA
January 15, 2022; 2:00 pm, FloHoops		at Hofstra	L 77–82	11–6 (2–2)	Mack Sports Complex (1,465); Hempstead, NY
January 17, 2022; 7:00 pm, CBSSN		at Northeastern	W 82–76 ^{OT}	12–6 (3–2)	Matthews Arena; Boston, MA
January 20, 2022; 7:00 pm, FloHoops		William & Mary	W 84–74	13–6 (4–2)	Bob Carpenter Center (1,560); Newark, DE
January 22, 2022; 1:00 pm, NBCSPHI		Elon	W 80–77	14–6 (5–2)	Bob Carpenter Center (1,664); Newark, DE
January 24, 2022; 7:00 pm, FloHoops		Towson; Rescheduled from January 5	L 62–69	14–7 (5–3)	Bob Carpenter Center (1,574); Newark, DE
January 29, 2022; 4:00 pm, FloHoops		at James Madison	W 85–69	15–7 (6–3)	Atlantic Union Bank Center (4,590); Harrisonburg, VA
February 3, 2022; 6:00 pm, CBSSN		Drexel	L 68–76	15–8 (6–4)	Bob Carpenter Center (2,844); Newark, DE
February 10, 2022; 7:00 pm, NBCSPHI		Northeastern	W 74–61	16–8 (7–4)	Bob Carpenter Center (2,347); Newark, DE
February 12, 2022; 6:30 pm, FloHoops		Hofstra	L 66–80	16–9 (7–5)	Bob Carpenter Center (1,916); Newark, DE
February 14, 2022; 7:00 pm, FloHoops		James Madison; Rescheduled from January 3	W 81–60	17–9 (8–5)	Bob Carpenter Center (1,298); Newark, DE
February 17, 2022; 7:00 pm, FloHoops		at Elon	W 71–62	18–9 (9–5)	Schar Center (1,902); Elon, NC
February 19, 2022; 4:00 pm, FloHoops		at William & Mary	W 73–69	19–9 (10–5)	Kaplan Arena (3,132); Williamsburg, VA
February 24, 2022; 7:00 pm, NBCSPHI		College of Charleston	L 96–99	19–10 (10–6)	Bob Carpenter Center (1,706); Newark, DE
February 26, 2022; 4:00 pm, FloHoops		UNC Wilmington	L 62–69	19–11 (10–7)	Bob Carpenter Center (2,794); Newark, DE
February 28, 2022; 6:00 pm, FloHoops		at Towson; Resumption from Jan. 27	L 57–69	19–12 (10–8)	SECU Arena (2,451); Towson, MD
CAA tournament
March 6, 2022; 2:30 pm, FloHoops	(5)	vs. (4) Drexel; Quarterfinals	W 66–56	20–12	Entertainment and Sports Arena (1,811); Washington, D.C.
March 7, 2022; 6:00 pm, CBSSN	(5)	vs. (1) Towson; Semifinals	W 69–56	21–12	Entertainment and Sports Arena (1,707); Washington, D.C.
March 8, 2022; 7:00 pm, CBSSN	(5)	vs. (2) UNC Wilmington; Championship	W 59–55	22–12	Entertainment and Sports Arena (1,869); Washington, D.C.
NCAA tournament
March 18, 2022; 2:45 p.m., CBS	(15 S)	vs. (2 S) No. 6 Villanova; First Round	L 60–80	22–13	PPG Paints Arena (18,738); Pittsburgh, PA
*Non-conference game. ^{#}Rankings from AP Poll. (#) Tournament seedings in parentheses. All times are in Eastern.
