= 2021–22 Charleston Cougars men's basketball team =

American college basketball season

2021–22 Charleston Cougars men's basketball

Rising Coaches Classic champions
- Conference: Colonial Athletic Association
- Record: 17–15 (8–10 CAA)
- Head coach: Pat Kelsey (1st season)
- Associate head coach: Dave Davis
- Assistant coaches: Brian Kloman; Michael Cassidy
- Home arena: TD Arena

2021–22 CAA men's basketball standings
	Conf.				Overall
Team	W		L	PCT	W		L	PCT
Towson	15	–	3	.833	25	–	9	.735
UNC Wilmington	15	–	3	.833	27	–	9	.750
Hofstra	13	–	5	.722	21	–	11	.656
Drexel	10	–	8	.556	15	–	14	.517
Delaware †	10	–	8	.556	22	–	13	.629
Charleston	8	–	10	.444	17	–	15	.531
Elon	7	–	11	.389	10	–	22	.313
James Madison*	6	–	12	.333	15	–	14	.517
William & Mary	4	–	14	.222	5	–	27	.156
Northeastern	2	–	16	.111	9	–	22	.290
† 2022 CAA tournament winner *Ineligible for conference tournament due to changing conferences in 2022

The 2021–22 College of Charleston Cougars men's basketball team represented the College of Charleston in the 2021–22 NCAA Division I men's basketball season. The Cougars, led by first-year head coach Pat Kelsey, played their home games at the TD Arena in Charleston, South Carolina as members of the Colonial Athletic Association. The Cougars finished the season 17–15, 8–10 in CAA play to finish in sixth place. They defeated Hofstra in the quarterfinals of the CAA tournament before losing to UNC Wilmington in the semifinals.

== Previous season ==
In a season limited due to the ongoing COVID-19 pandemic, the Cougars finished the 2020–21 season 9–10, 6–4 CAA play to finish in third place. They lost in the quarterfinals of the CAA tournament to Drexel.

Following the season, head coach Earl Grant was hired as the new coach at Boston College. Shortly thereafter, the school named Winthrop coach Pat Kelsey the team's new head coach.

== Offseason ==
=== 2021 recruiting class ===
College recruiting information
Name	Hometown	School	Height	Weight	Commit date
Raekwon Horton; F	Santee, SC	Vermont Academy	6 ft 7 in (2.01 m)	205 lb (93 kg)	Sep 5, 2020
Raekwon Horton; F	Recruit ratings: Scout: Rivals: 247Sports: (NR)				
Reyne Smith; G	Ulverstone, Tasmania	Australian Institute of Sports	6 ft 2 in (1.88 m)	190 lb (86 kg)	Mar 8, 2021
Reyne Smith; G	Recruit ratings: Scout: Rivals: 247Sports: (NR)				
Babacar Faye; F	Saly, Senegal	NBA Academy Africa	6 ft 8 in (2.03 m)	205 lb (93 kg)	Jun 30, 2021
Babacar Faye; F	Recruit ratings: Scout: Rivals: 247Sports: (NR)				
Ben Burnham; F	Matthews, NC	Carmel Christian Academy	6 ft 7 in (2.01 m)	220 lb (100 kg)	Jul 1, 2021
Ben Burnham; F	Recruit ratings: Scout: Rivals: 247Sports: (NR)				
Overall recruit ranking:
Note: In many cases, Scout, Rivals, 247Sports, On3, and ESPN may conflict in their listings of height and weight.; In these cases, the average was taken. ESPN grades are on a 100-point scale.; Sources: "2021 Team Ranking". Rivals.

== Roster ==
2021–22 College of Charleston Cougars men's basketball team
Players
Coaches

Pos.	#	Name	Height	Weight	Year	Previous school	Hometown
G	1	Jordan Sechan	6 ft 1 in (1.85 m)	—	GS	Bucknell	New Canaan, CT
G	2	Reyne Smith	6 ft 2 in (1.88 m)	180 lb (82 kg)	Fr	Australian Institute of Sport	Ulverstone, Australia
G	3	Dalton Bolon	6 ft 4 in (1.93 m)	205 lb (93 kg)	GS	West Liberty	Gnadenhutten, OH
F	4	Raekwon Horton	6 ft 6 in (1.98 m)	200 lb (91 kg)	Fr	Vermont Academy	Santee, SC
G	5	Brenden Tucker	6 ft 3 in (1.91 m)	180 lb (82 kg)	Jr	Dacula HS	Lawrenceville, GA
G/F	11	Dimitrius Underwood	6 ft 4 in (1.93 m)	215 lb (98 kg)	GS	UT Dallas	Mesquite, TX
F	12	John Meeks	6 ft 6 in (1.98 m)	224 lb (102 kg)	GS	Bucknell	Burlington, NC
F	25	Ben Burnham	6 ft 7 in (2.01 m)	200 lb (91 kg)	Fr	Carmel Christian School	Fort Mill, SC
F	30	Nick Farrar	6 ft 6 in (1.98 m)	250 lb (113 kg)	So	NC State	Apex, NC
G	31	Jack Miller	5 ft 11 in (1.8 m)	—	Fr	Ocean Township HS	Ocean Township, NJ
F/C	33	Osinachi Smart	6 ft 8 in (2.03 m)	240 lb (109 kg)	GS	New Garden Friends School	Umuahia, Nigeria
F	34	Charles Lampten	6 ft 11 in (2.11 m)	230 lb (104 kg)	Jr	Dawson CC	Roanoke, TX
F	35	Babacar Faye	6 ft 8 in (2.03 m)	—	Fr	NBA Academy Africa	Saly, Senegal
G	41	Nikita Evdokimov	6 ft 5 in (1.96 m)	—	Fr	Lokomotiv Kuban	Chekhov, Russia
G	45	Dylan Ritter	6 ft 1 in (1.85 m)	—	Fr	Zionsville HS	Zionsville, IN
F	50	Adam Comer	6 ft 9 in (2.06 m)	—	Fr	Broome HS	Spartanburg, SC

Head coach

- Pat Kelsey (Xavier)

Assistant coach(es)

- Dave Davis (Warren Wilson)
- Brian Kloman (Tennessee)
- Michael Cassidy (ACPE)

Legend

- (C) Team captain
- (S) Suspended
- (I) Ineligible
- (W) Walk-on
- Injured
- Current redshirt

Roster
Last update: January 23, 2022

== Schedule and results ==
Date time, TV	Rank^{#}	Opponent^{#}	Result	Record	High points	High rebounds	High assists	Site (attendance) city, state
Non-conference regular season
November 11, 2021*; 7:00 pm, FloHoops		South Carolina State; Rising Coaches Classic	W 106–74	1–0	19 – Meeks	8 – Smart	4 – Underwood	TD Arena (4,448); Charleston, SC
November 12, 2021*; 7:30 pm, FloHoops		Lipscomb; Rising Coaches Classic	W 86–77	2–0	16 – Meeks	11 – Smart	6 – Ali	TD Arena (4,151); Charleston, SC
November 13, 2021*; 5:00 pm, FloHoops		Loyola (MD); Rising Coaches Classic	W 79–72	3–0	20 – Tucker	12 – Underwood	6 – Meeks	TD Arena (4,166); Charleston, SC
November 16, 2021*; 8:30 pm, CBSSN		No. 18 North Carolina	L 83–94	3–1	19 – Smith	7 – Team	4 – Ali	TD Arena (5,203); Charleston, SC
November 22, 2021*; 8:00 pm, ESPN+		at Oklahoma State	L 66–96	3–2	22 – Meeks	10 – Team	2 – Underwood	Gallagher-Iba Arena (8,307); Stillwater, OK
November 27, 2021*; 4:00 pm, ESPN+		at Chattanooga	W 68–66	4–2	18 – Smith	5 – Smart	3 – Ali	McKenzie Arena (2,244); Chattanooga, TN
November 30, 2021*; 7:30 pm, FloHoops		Tulane	W 81–77	5–2	22 – Smith	8 – Meeks	6 – Meeks	TD Arena (3,852); Charleston, SC
December 3, 2021*; 7:00 pm, ESPN+		at Furman	L 88–91 ^{OT}	5–3	24 – Smith	9 – Underwood	3 – Ali	Timmons Arena (2,015); Greenville, SC
December 7, 2021*; 8:00 pm, ESPN+		at Tulane	W 86–72	6–3	15 – Smith	8 – Underwood	8 – Ali	Devlin Fieldhouse (653); New Orleans, LA
December 12, 2021*; 2:00 pm, FloHoops		Presbyterian	W 78–76 ^{OT}	7–3	23 – Tucker	10 – Burnham	6 – Underwood	TD Arena (3,648); Charleston, SC
December 16, 2021*; 7:00 pm, ESPN+		at Stetson	L 59–67	7–4	14 – Horton	9 – Horton	3 – Smith	Edmunds Center (399); DeLand, FL
December 19, 2021*; 2:00 pm		vs. Rhode Island; Holiday Hoops Fest	Canceled due to COVID-19 protocols at Rhode Island					Entertainment and Sports Arena; Washington, D.C.
December 22, 2021*; 7:00 pm, ODUSports.com		at Old Dominion	W 82–80	8–4	13 – Underwood	10 – Smart	3 – Underwood	Chartway Arena (4,272); Norfolk, VA
CAA regular season
December 31, 2021; 2:00 pm, FloHoops		Delaware	L 66–67	8–5 (0–1)	17 – Meeks	10 – Smart	4 – Underwood	TD Arena (3,394); Charleston, SC
January 9, 2022; 4:00 pm, FloHoops		Elon	W 65–61	9–5 (1–1)	19 – Meeks	7 – Meeks	2 – Smith	TD Arena (3,635); Charleston, SC
January 17, 2022; 7:00 pm, FloHoops		UNC Wilmington	L 78–86	9–6 (1–2)	27 – Meeks	9 – Underwood	3 – Meeks	TD Arena (3,844); Charleston, SC
January 20, 2022; 7:00 pm, FloHoops		at Towson	L 67–74	9–7 (1–3)	16 – Meeks	9 – Underwood	4 – Meeks	SECU Arena (968); Towson, MD
January 22, 2022; 4:00 pm, FloHoops		at James Madison	L 94–95	9–8 (1–4)	21 – Smith	9 – Smart	3 – Smith	Atlantic Union Bank Center (4,721); Harrisonburg, VA
January 25, 2022; 7:00 pm, FloHoops		William & Mary; Rescheduled from January 11	W 74–73	10–8 (2–4)	25 – Smith	7 – Burnham	5 – Underwood	TD Arena (3,230); Charleston, SC
January 27, 2022; 7:00 pm, FloHoops		Hofstra	L 73–76	10–9 (2–5)	17 – Tucker	9 – Underwood	4 – Smith	TD Arena (3,719); Charleston, SC
January 29, 2022; 4:00 pm, FloHoops		Northeastern	W 81–63	11–9 (3–5)	22 – Meeks	7 – Burnham	6 – Underwood	TD Arena (4,634); Charleston, SC
February 3, 2022; 7:00 pm, FloHoops		at William & Mary	W 84–61	12–9 (4–5)	21 – Tucker	8 – Underwood	5 – Meeks	Kaplan Arena (2,352); Williamsburg, VA
February 5, 2022; 4:00 pm, FloHoops		at Elon	W 66–64	13–9 (5–5)	23 – Farrar	8 – Tucker	2 – Horton	Schar Center (2,690); Elon, NC
February 12, 2022; 7:00 pm, FloHoops		at UNC Wilmington	L 79–85	13–10 (5–6)	21 – Meeks	9 – Meeks	5 – Tucker	Trask Coliseum (5,250); Wilmington, NC
February 14, 2022; 7:00 pm, FloHoops		Drexel; Rescheduled from December 29	W 79–75	14–10 (6–6)	17 – Farrar	7 – Underwood	5 – Meeks	TD Arena (3,516); Charleston, SC
February 17, 2022; 7:00 pm, FloHoops		James Madison	L 63–71	14–11 (6–7)	14 – Underwood	12 – Underwood	3 – Underwood	TD Arena (4,283); Charleston, SC
February 19, 2022; 4:00 pm, FloHoops		Towson	L 77–80	14–12 (6–8)	21 – Underwood	11 – Underwood	6 – Underwood	TD Arena (5,060); Charleston, SC
February 22, 2022; 7:00 pm, FloHoops		at Northeastern; Rescheduled from January 3	W 83–72	15–12 (7–8)	19 – Underwood	8 – Underwood	8 – Underwood	Matthews Arena (518); Boston, MA
February 24, 2022; 7:00 pm, FloHoops		at Delaware	W 99–96	16–12 (8–8)	22 – Smith	11 – Underwood	8 – Underwood	Bob Carpenter Center (1,706); Newark, DE
February 26, 2022; 4:00 pm, FloHoops		at Drexel	L 79–80	16–13 (8–9)	23 – Underwood	10 – Horton	6 – Underwood	Daskalakis Athletic Center (1,184); Philadelphia, PA
February 28, 2022; 7:00 pm, FloHoops		at Hofstra; Rescheduled from January 5	L 84–89	16–14 (8–10)	19 – Smith	13 – Burnham	6 – Smith	Mack Sports Complex (1,416); Hempstead, NY
CAA tournament
March 6, 2022; 8:30 pm, FloHoops	(6)	vs. (3) Hofstra; Quarterfinals	W 92–76	17–14	31 – Meeks	8 – Horton	4 – Tucker	Entertainment and Sports Arena (1,578); Washington, D.C.
March 7, 2022; 8:30 pm, CBSSN	(6)	vs. (2) UNC Wilmington; Semifinals	L 57–60	17–15	21 – Underwood	10 – Horton	1 – Tucker	Entertainment and Sports Arena (1,707); Washington, D.C.
*Non-conference game. ^{#}Rankings from AP Poll. (#) Tournament seedings in parentheses. All times are in Eastern.

== Awards and honors ==
Conference honors
Honors	Player	Position
CAA All-Tournament Team	John Meeks	F
All-CAA Second Team	John Meeks	F
All-CAA Third Team	Dimitrius Underwood	G/F
CAA All-Rookie Team	Reyne Smith	G
CAA All-Rookie Team	Ben Burnham	F
CAA All-Defensive Team	Dimitrius Underwood	G/F
