= Martin Ingelsby =

American basketball player and coach

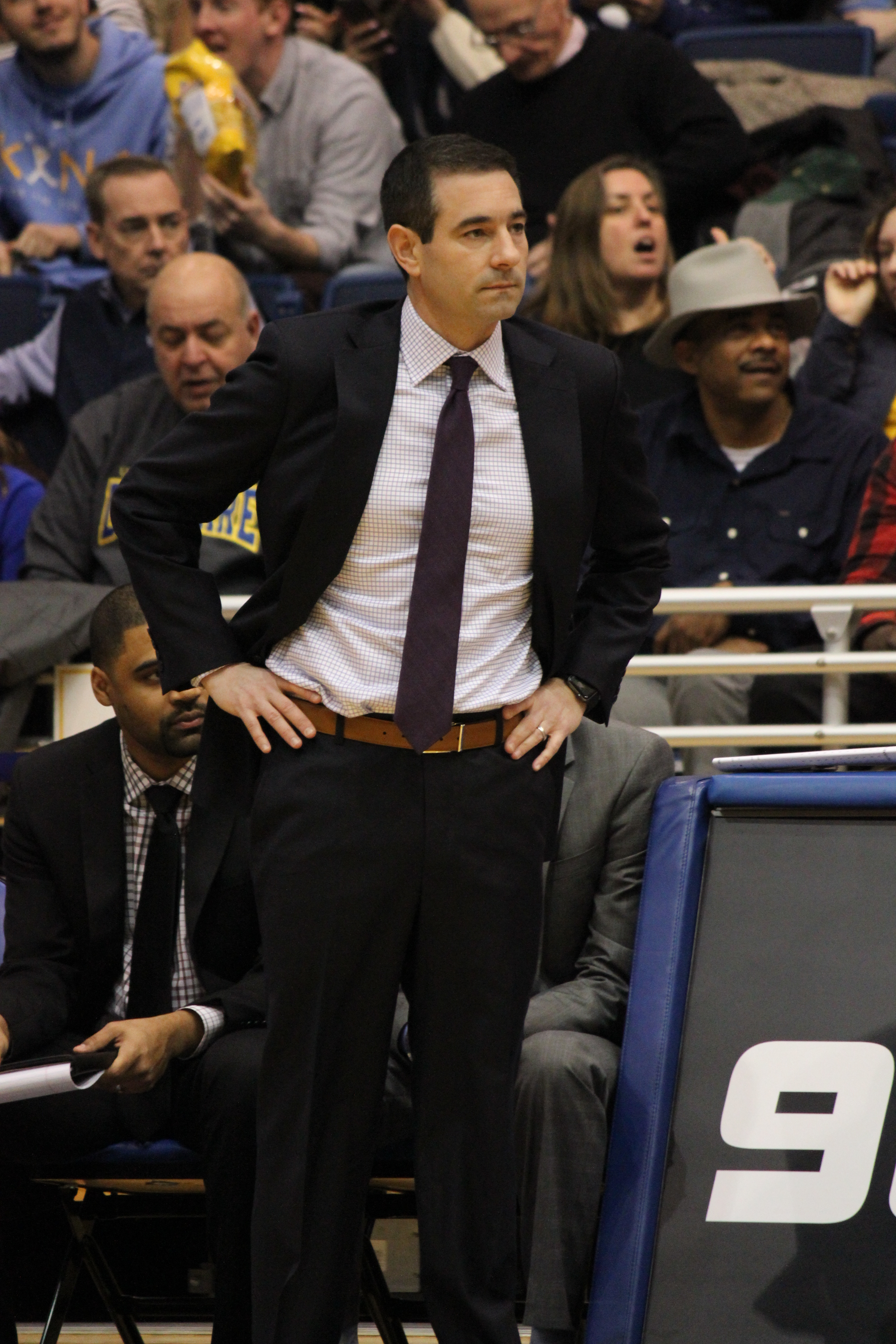

Current position
- Title: Head coach
- Team: Delaware
- Conference: C-USA
- Record: 157–158 (.498)

Biographical details
- Born: November 24, 1978 (age 47); Media, Pennsylvania, U.S.

Playing career
- 1997–2001: Notre Dame
- Position: Point guard

Coaching career (HC unless noted)
- 2002–2003: Wagner (assistant)
- 2009–2016: Notre Dame (assistant)
- 2016–present: Delaware

Administrative career (AD unless noted)
- 2003–2009: Notre Dame (coord. ops.)

Head coaching record
- Overall: 157–158 (.498)
- Tournaments: 0–1 (NCAA Division I)

Accomplishments and honors

Championships
- CAA tournament (2022)

Martin Ingelsby (born November 24, 1978) is an American college basketball coach and the current head coach for the University of Delaware.

Ingelsby played basketball at Archbishop Carroll High School and Notre Dame. He was a standout point guard, starting for three seasons for the Fighting Irish. Following the close of his college career, Inglesby pursued a coaching career, landing at Wagner for one season before returning to his alma mater as the coordinator of basketball operations in 2003. In 2009, he was promoted to a full assistant on Mike Brey's staff. On May 24, 2016, Ingelsby was named the 24th head coach in Delaware history.

Ingelsby is the son of former National Basketball Association (NBA) player Tom Ingelsby. His brother Brad Ingelsby is a screenwriter.

== Head coaching record ==
Record table
Season	Team	Overall	Conference	Standing	Postseason
Delaware Fightin' Blue Hens (Coastal Athletic Association) (2016–2025)
2016–17	Delaware	13–20	5–13	9th	
2017–18	Delaware	14–19	6–12	T–7th	
2018–19	Delaware	17–16	8–10	5th	
2019–20	Delaware	22–11	11–7	T–4th	
2020–21	Delaware	7–8	5–4	5th	
2021–22	Delaware	22–13	10–8	T–4th	NCAA Division I Round of 64
2022–23	Delaware	17–16	8–10	T–6th	
2023–24	Delaware	19–14	10–8	T–6th	
2024–25	Delaware	16–20	5–13	12th	
Delaware Fightin' Blue Hens (Conference USA) (2025–present)
2025–26	Delaware	10–21	6–14	12th	
2026–27	Delaware	0–0	0–0		
Delaware:		157–158 (.498)	75–99 (.431)		
Total:		157–158 (.498)			
National champion Postseason invitational champion Conference regular season champion Conference regular season and conference tournament champion Division regular season champion Division regular season and conference tournament champion Conference tournament champion
