= 2022 CAA men's basketball tournament =

- Classification: Division I
- Season: 2021–22
- Teams: 9
- Site: Entertainment and Sports Arena; Washington, D.C.
- Champions: Delaware (2nd title)
- Winning coach: Martin Ingelsby (1st title)
- MVP: Jyare Davis (Delaware)
- Top scorer: Jaylen Sims (UNCW) (60 points)
- Television: FloHoops, CBSSN

2021–22 CAA men's basketball standings
	Conf.				Overall
Team	W		L	PCT	W		L	PCT
Towson	15	–	3	.833	25	–	9	.735
UNC Wilmington	15	–	3	.833	27	–	9	.750
Hofstra	13	–	5	.722	21	–	11	.656
Drexel	10	–	8	.556	15	–	14	.517
Delaware †	10	–	8	.556	22	–	13	.629
Charleston	8	–	10	.444	17	–	15	.531
Elon	7	–	11	.389	10	–	22	.313
James Madison*	6	–	12	.333	15	–	14	.517
William & Mary	4	–	14	.222	5	–	27	.156
Northeastern	2	–	16	.111	9	–	22	.290
† 2022 CAA tournament winner *Ineligible for conference tournament due to changing conferences in 2022

The 2022 Colonial Athletic Association men's basketball tournament was the postseason men's college basketball tournament for the Colonial Athletic Association for the 2021–22 NCAA Division I men's basketball season. The tournament was held March 5–8, 2022, at the Entertainment and Sports Arena in Washington, D.C. The winner, the Delaware Fightin' Blue Hens, received the conference's automatic bid to the 2022 NCAA tournament.

== Seeds ==
Seed	School	Conf.	Tiebreaker
1	Towson	15–3	2–0 vs. Hofstra
2	UNC Wilmington	15–3	1–1 vs. Hofstra
3	Hofstra	13–5	
4	Drexel	10–8	1–1 vs. Towson
5	Delaware	10–8	0–2 vs. Towson
6	Charleston	8–10	
7	Elon	7–11	
8	William & Mary	4–14	
9	Northeastern	2–16	

== Schedule ==
Session	Game	Time*	Matchup	Score	Television
First round – Saturday, March 5
1	1	5:00 pm	No. 8 William & Mary vs. No. 9 Northeastern	63–68	FloHoops
Quarterfinals – Sunday, March 6
2	2	12:00 pm	No. 1 Towson vs. No. 9 Northeastern	68–61	FloHoops
2	3	2:30 pm	No. 4 Drexel vs. No. 5 Delaware	56–66	FloHoops
3	4	6:00 pm	No. 2 UNCW vs. No. 7 Elon	75–58	FloHoops
3	5	8:30 pm	No. 3 Hofstra vs. No. 6 Charleston	76–92	FloHoops
Semifinals – Monday, March 7
4	6	6:00 pm	No. 1 Towson vs. No. 5 Delaware	56–69	CBSSN
4	7	8:30 pm	No. 2 UNCW vs. No. 6 Charleston	60–57	CBSSN
Championship – Tuesday, March 8
5	8	7:00 pm	No. 5 Delaware vs. No. 2 UNCW	59–55	CBSSN
*Game times in ET. Rankings denote tournament seed

== Bracket ==
First round Saturday, March 5 FloHoops
8	William & Mary	63
9	Northeastern	68*

Quarterfinals; Sunday, March 6 FloHoops
1	Towson	68
9	Northeastern	61
4	Drexel	56
5	Delaware	66
2	UNC Wilmington	75
7	Elon	58
3	Hofstra	76
6	Charleston	92

Semifinals; Monday, March 7 CBS Sports Network
1	Towson	56
5	Delaware	69
2	UNC Wilmington	60
6	Charleston	57

Championship; Tuesday, March 8 CBS Sports Network
5	Delaware	59
2	UNC Wilmington	55

* denotes overtime game

== See also ==
- 2022 CAA women's basketball tournament
