= 2021–22 Elon Phoenix men's basketball team =

American college basketball season

2021–22 Elon Phoenix men's basketball
- Conference: Colonial Athletic Association
- Record: 10–22 (7–11 CAA)
- Head coach: Mike Schrage (3rd season)
- Assistant coaches: Jonathan Holmes; Allen Payne; Noel Gillespie
- Home arena: Schar Center

2021–22 CAA men's basketball standings
| | Conf. | | | | Overall |
| Team | W | | L | PCT | W | | L | PCT |
|---|---|---|---|---|---|---|---|---|
| Towson | 15 | – | 3 | .833 | 25 | – | 9 | .735 |
| UNC Wilmington | 15 | – | 3 | .833 | 27 | – | 9 | .750 |
| Hofstra | 13 | – | 5 | .722 | 21 | – | 11 | .656 |
| Drexel | 10 | – | 8 | .556 | 15 | – | 14 | .517 |
| Delaware † | 10 | – | 8 | .556 | 22 | – | 13 | .629 |
| Charleston | 8 | – | 10 | .444 | 17 | – | 15 | .531 |
| Elon | 7 | – | 11 | .389 | 10 | – | 22 | .313 |
| James Madison* | 6 | – | 12 | .333 | 15 | – | 14 | .517 |
| William & Mary | 4 | – | 14 | .222 | 5 | – | 27 | .156 |
| Northeastern | 2 | – | 16 | .111 | 9 | – | 22 | .290 |
† 2022 CAA tournament winner *Ineligible for conference tournament due to changing conferences in 2022

The 2021–22 Elon Phoenix men's basketball team represented Elon University in the 2021–22 NCAA Division I men's basketball season. The Phoenix, led by third-year head coach Mike Schrage, played their home games at the Schar Center in Elon, North Carolina as members of the Colonial Athletic Association (CAA). They finished the season 10–22, 7–11 in CAA play, to finish in seventh place. They lost in the quarterfinals of the CAA tournament to UNC Wilmington.

== Previous season ==
In a season limited due to the ongoing COVID-19 pandemic, the Phoenix finished the 2020–21 season 10–9, 4–7 in CAA play, to finish in eighth place. In the CAA tournament, they defeated Towson, top-seeded James Madison, and Hofstra to advance to the tournament championship game for the first time in program history. There they lost to Drexel.

== Roster ==
2021–22 Elon Phoenix men's basketball team
Players
Coaches

| Pos. | # | Name | Height | Weight | Year | Previous school | Hometown |
|---|---|---|---|---|---|---|---|
| G | 0 | Hunter McIntosh | 6 ft 2 in (1.88 m) | 180 lb (82 kg) | Jr | Greater Atlanta Christian School | Snellville, GA |
| F/C | 1 | Chuck Hannah | 6 ft 7 in (2.01 m) | 229 lb (104 kg) | Sr | Northfield Mount Hermon | Boston, MA |
| G/F | 2 | JaDun Michael | 6 ft 5 in (1.96 m) | 198 lb (90 kg) | So | The Burlington School | Burlington, NC |
| G | 3 | Charlie Mendys | 6 ft 0 in (1.83 m) | 183 lb (83 kg) | RS Sr | Roanoke College | Carrboro, NC |
| F/C | 4 | Sam Sherry | 6 ft 10 in (2.08 m) | 220 lb (100 kg) | Fr | Cumberland Valley HS | Mechanicsburg, PA |
| G/F | 5 | Torrence Watson | 6 ft 5 in (1.96 m) | 199 lb (90 kg) | Sr | Missouri | St. Louis, MO |
| G | 10 | Kris Wooten | 6 ft 2 in (1.88 m) | 194 lb (88 kg) | Sr | Arendell Parrott Academy | Kinston, NC |
| G | 11 | RJ Noord | 6 ft 3 in (1.91 m) | 170 lb (77 kg) | Fr | Heritage HS | Decatur, GA |
| G | 12 | Darius Burford | 6 ft 0 in (1.83 m) | 166 lb (75 kg) | So | Bolingbrook HS | Bolingbrook, IL |
| G/F | 13 | Jerald Gillens-Butler | 6 ft 5 in (1.96 m) | 227 lb (103 kg) | RS Sr | Butler | Orlando, FL |
| G | 14 | Zac Ervin | 6 ft 5 in (1.96 m) | 201 lb (91 kg) | Jr | Gate City HS | Gate City, VA |
| F/C | 21 | Michael Graham | 6 ft 8 in (2.03 m) | 221 lb (100 kg) | So | Canterbury School | Brooklyn, NY |
| G | 23 | Ben Daugherty | 6 ft 1 in (1.85 m) | 183 lb (83 kg) | Jr | Western Reserve Academy | Chagrin Falls, OH |
| G | 24 | Reece Clark | 6 ft 4 in (1.93 m) | 181 lb (82 kg) | Fr | Northfield Mount Hermon | Weston, MA |
| G/F | 25 | Hunter Woods | 6 ft 6 in (1.98 m) | 197 lb (89 kg) | Jr | John Muir HS | Pasadena, CA |
| C | 30 | Andrew Junkin | 7 ft 0 in (2.13 m) | 236 lb (107 kg) | RS Jr | Mississippi State | New Hope, MS |

Head coach

- Mike Schrage (Indiana)

Assistant coach(es)

- Jonathan Holmes (North Carolina)
- Allen Payne (Auburn)
- Noel Gillespie (UW–Whitewater)

Legend

- (C) Team captain
- (S) Suspended
- (I) Ineligible
- (W) Walk-on
- Injured
- Current redshirt

Roster
Last update: December 31, 2021

== Schedule and results ==
| Date time, TV | Rank^{#} | Opponent^{#} | Result | Record | High points | High rebounds | High assists | Site (attendance) city, state |
Non-conference regular season
| November 9, 2021*; 8:00 p.m., SECN+ | | at Florida | L 61–74 | 0–1 | 16 – Graham | 9 – Graham | 3 – Gillens-Butler | O'Connell Center (9,275); Gainesville, FL |
| November 12, 2021*; 7:00 p.m., FloHoops | | Randolph | W 107–62 | 1–1 | 18 – Wooten | 10 – Graham | 5 – 2 tied | Schar Center (1,949); Elon, NC |
| November 14, 2021*; 2:00 p.m., FloHoops | | Bluefield | W 89–72 | 2–1 | 29 – Ervin | 12 – Burford | 6 – Burford | Schar Center (1,638); Elon, NC |
| November 18, 2021*; 9:30 p.m., ESPN2 | | vs. West Virginia; Charleston Classic first round | L 68–87 | 2–2 | 15 – Watson | 7 – 2 tied | 4 – Watson | TD Arena (4,213); Charleston, SC |
| November 19, 2021*; 9:00 p.m., ESPN3 | | vs. Ole Miss; Charleston Classic consolation 2nd round | L 56–74 | 2–3 | 16 – Burford | 8 – Woods | 4 – Burford | TD Arena (4,672); Charleston, SC |
| November 21, 2021*; 10:30 a.m., ESPNU | | vs. Temple; Charleston Classic 7th-place game | L 58–75 | 2–4 | 16 – McIntosh | 7 – Burford | 4 – McIntosh | TD Arena; Charleston, SC |
| November 27, 2021*; 1:00 p.m., FloHoops | | Jacksonville State | L 81–93 | 2–5 | 18 – Ervin | 8 – Woods | 6 – McIntosh | Schar Center (1,522); Elon, NC |
| November 30, 2021*; 7:00 p.m., ESPN+ | | at UNC Greensboro | L 61–74 | 2–6 | 15 – Burford | 7 – Graham | 5 – McIntosh | Greensboro Coliseum (1,847); Greensboro, NC |
| December 4, 2021*; 7:00 p.m., FloHoops | | High Point | L 77–83 | 2–7 | 34 – Watson | 7 – Hannah | 5 – 2 tied | Schar Center (3,158); Elon, NC |
| December 11, 2021*; 8:00 p.m., ACCN | | at North Carolina | L 63–80 | 2–8 | 16 – McIntosh | 5 – Watson | 6 – Watson | Dean Smith Center (16,607); Chapel Hill, NC |
| December 15, 2021*; 7:00 p.m., FloHoops | | Winthrop | W 63–61 | 3–8 | 13 – Graham | 15 – Graham | 6 – McIntosh | Schar Center (1,256); Elon, NC |
| December 18, 2021*; 4:00 p.m., ACCN | | at No. 2 Duke | L 56–87 | 3–9 | 14 – Gillens-Butler | 6 – 2 tied | 3 – Burford | Cameron Indoor Stadium (9,314); Durham, NC |
| December 21, 2021*; 7:00 p.m., SECN+ | | at Arkansas | L 55–81 | 3–10 | 14 – Graham | 7 – Woods | 3 – 2 tied | Bud Walton Arena (19,200); Fayetteville, AR |
CAA regular season
| December 29, 2021; 7:00 p.m., FloHoops | | Northeastern | W 79–62 | 4–10 (1–0) | 23 – Burford | 7 – Gillens-Butler | 3 – 4 tied | Schar Center (1,487); Elon, NC |
| January 9, 2022; 4:00 p.m., FloHoops | | at College of Charleston | L 61–65 | 4–11 (1–1) | 22 – McIntosh | 8 – Graham | 3 – Burford | TD Arena (3,635); Charleston, SC |
| January 12, 2022; 7:00 p.m., FloHoops | | at UNC Wilmington | L 66–73 | 4–12 (1–2) | 23 – Burford | 7 – Woods | 4 – Burford | Trask Coliseum (2,595); Wilmington, NC |
| January 15, 2022; 4:00 p.m., FloHoops | | Towson | L 54–59 | 4–13 (1–3) | 13 – McIntosh | 8 – Burford | 5 – McIntosh | Schar Center (1,821); Elon, NC |
| January 17, 2022; 4:00 p.m., FloHoops | | James Madison | W 90–67 | 5–13 (2–3) | 23 – Wooten | 8 – Burford | 7 – McIntosh | Schar Center (1,684); Elon, NC |
| January 20, 2022; 7:00 p.m., FloHoops | | at Drexel | L 49–77 | 5–14 (2–4) | 16 – Woods | 17 – Graham | 1 – 6 tied | Daskalakis Athletic Center (788); Philadelphia, PA |
| January 22, 2022; 1:00 p.m., FloHoops | | at Delaware | L 77–80 | 5–15 (2–5) | 20 – Watson | 11 – Graham | 4 – 2 tied | Bob Carpenter Center (1,664); Newark, DE |
| January 27, 2022; 7:00 p.m., FloHoops | | William & Mary; Rescheduled from January 5 | W 61–54 | 6–15 (3–5) | 20 – Graham | 12 – Graham | 6 – Woods | Schar Center (1,585); Elon, NC |
| January 29, 2022; 4:00 p.m., FloHoops | | at William & Mary | L 61–65 | 6–16 (3–6) | 20 – Burford | 11 – Graham | 8 – Burford | Kaplan Arena (2,472); Williamsburg, VA |
| February 3, 2022; 7:00 p.m., FloHoops | | UNC Wilmington | W 78–65 | 7–16 (4–6) | 27 – Burford | 11 – Graham | 4 – McIntosh | Schar Center (2,405); Elon, NC |
| February 5, 2022; 4:00 p.m., FloHoops | | College of Charleston | L 64–66 | 7–17 (4–7) | 20 – McIntosh | 6 – Ervin | 4 – Burford | Schar Center (2,690); Elon, NC |
| February 10, 2022; 7:00 p.m., FloHoops | | at James Madison | W 70–66 | 8–17 (5–7) | 23 – McIntosh | 6 – Hannah | 6 – Woods | Atlantic Union Bank Center (3,414); Harrisonburg, VA |
| February 12, 2022; 2:00 p.m., FloHoops | | at Towson | L 50–86 | 8–18 (5–8) | 9 – tied | 7 – Woods | 4 – Burford | SECU Arena (1,832); Towson, MD |
| February 15, 2022; 7:00 p.m., FloHoops | | Hofstra; Rescheduled from December 31 | L 64–97 | 8–19 (5–9) | 19 – McIntosh | 8 – Junkin | 4 – Woods | Schar Center (1,232); Elon, NC |
| February 17, 2022; 7:00 p.m., FloHoops | | Delaware | L 62–71 | 8–20 (5–10) | 21 – Burford | 9 – Graham | 3 – McIntosh | Schar Center (1,902); Elon, NC |
| February 19, 2022; 4:00 p.m., FloHoops | | Drexel | L 60–71 | 8–21 (5–11) | 31 – Burford | 9 – Hannah | 3 – McIntosh | Schar Center (2,456); Elon, NC |
| February 24, 2022; 7:00 p.m., FloHoops | | at Hofstra | W 81–55 | 9–21 (6–11) | 21 – Burford | 10 – Junkin | 3 – 2 tied | Mack Sports Complex (1,454); Hempstead, NY |
| February 26, 2022; 4:00 p.m., CBSSN | | at Northeastern | W 67–54 | 10–21 (7–11) | 21 – McIntosh | 10 – Graham | 3 – Burford | Matthews Arena (1,117); Boston, MA |
CAA tournament
| March 6, 2022; 6:00 p.m., FloHoops | (7) | vs. (2) UNC Wilmington; Quarterfinals | L 58–75 | 10–22 | 15 – McIntosh | 5 – Hannah | 4 – McIntosh | Entertainment and Sports Arena (1,578); Washington, D.C. |
*Non-conference game. ^{#}Rankings from AP poll. (#) Tournament seedings in parentheses. All times are in Eastern.
