= Trinity Academy (Raleigh, North Carolina) =

Private, Protestant, Christian school in North Carolina

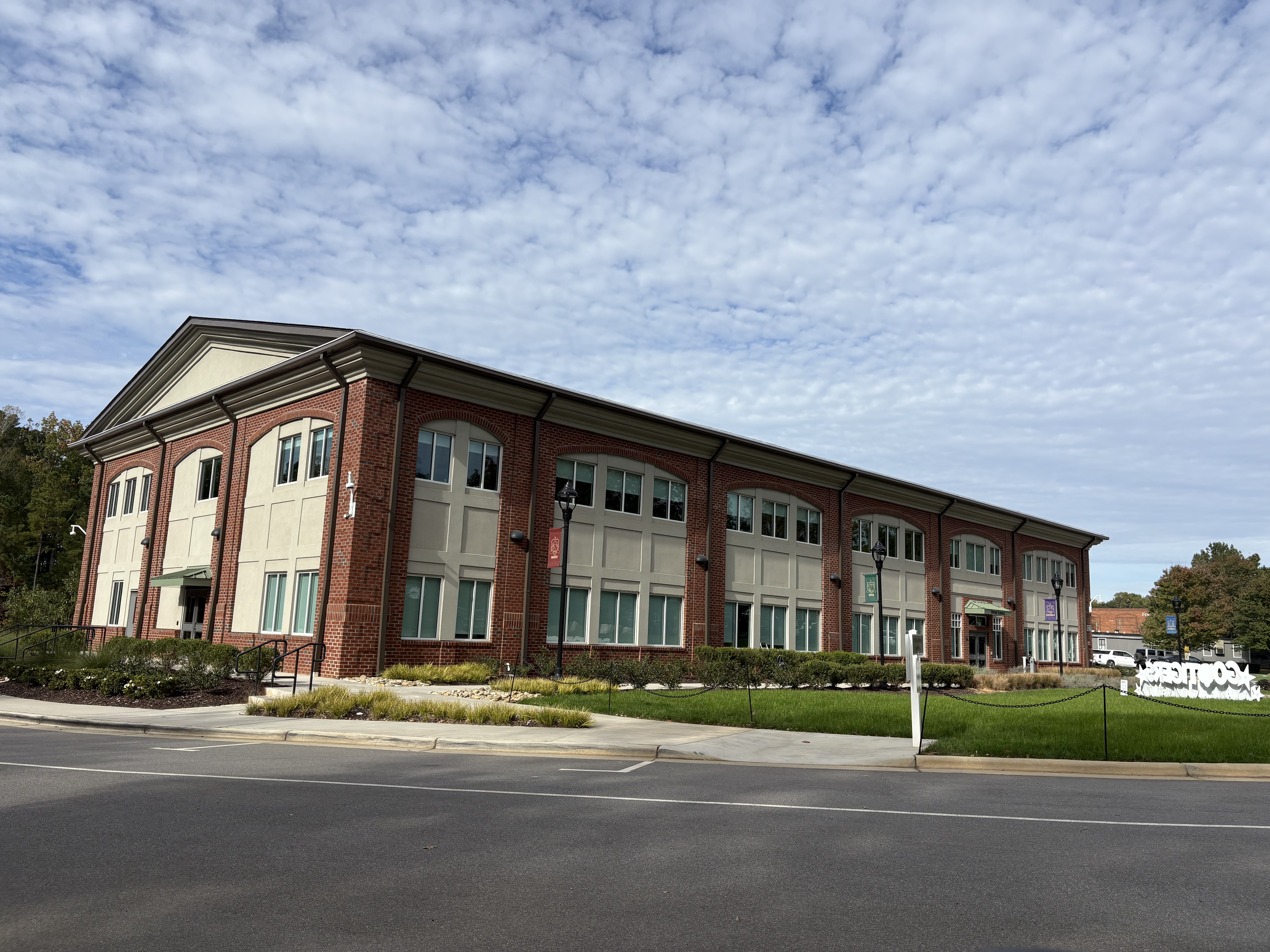
- The school in 2025

Location
- 10224 Baileywick Rd; Raleigh, North Carolina 27613; United States; 35°54′39″N 78°41′48″W

Information
- Type: Private
- Religious affiliation: Protestant Christian
- Denomination: Interdenominational
- Established: 1995 (31 years ago)
- CEEB code: 343241
- Headmaster: Timothy Bridges
- Faculty: 61.3 (on an FTE basis)
- Grades: PK–12
- Enrollment: 476 (2020–21)
- Campus size: 38 acres
- Campus type: Suburban
- Colors: Black and Vegas gold
- Athletics: North Carolina Independent Schools Athletic Association (NCISAA)
- Athletics conference: Triangle Triad Athletic Conference (varsity), Capital Area Middle School Conference (middle school)
- Mascot: Tigers
- Accreditation: SACS and NCAIS
- Tuition: $5196 (Half-Day TK) $9390 (Full Day TK) $11309 (Kindergarten) $14659 (grades 1–6) $15485 (grades 7–12) plus student activity fees for all grades
- Website: www.trinityacademy.com

Trinity Academy, formerly Trinity Academy of Raleigh, is a private Christian classical school in Raleigh, North Carolina.

== History ==
Trinity Academy was founded in September 1995 by a board of directors. In 1998, Trinity Academy of Raleigh was formed when Trinity Academy (a high school) and Regent School of Raleigh (K–8) merged. Originally, the two divisions were on different campuses: (Asbury United Methodist Church and Calvary Presbyterian Church). In 2002, the entire school moved to Providence Baptist Church, and then again in 2005 to 10224 Baileywick Road campus where the school resides today.
