= 2020–21 Colonial Athletic Association men's basketball season =

- League: NCAA Division I
- Sport: Basketball
- Duration: November, 2020 – March, 2021
- Teams: 10

Regular Season
- Co-champions: James Madison, Northeastern
- Runners-up: Charleston
- Season MVP: Matt Lewis (James Madison)
- Top scorer: Jalen Ray (Hofstra)

Tournament
- Champions: Drexel
- Runners-up: Elon
- Finals MVP: Camren Wynter (Drexel)

CAA men's basketball seasons
- ← 2019–20 2021–22 →

2020–21 CAA men's basketball standings
	Conf.				Overall
Team	W		L	PCT	W		L	PCT
James Madison	8	–	2	.800	13	–	7	.650
Northeastern	8	–	2	.800	10	–	9	.526
Charleston	6	–	4	.600	9	–	10	.474
Hofstra	8	–	6	.571	13	–	10	.565
Delaware	5	–	4	.556	7	–	8	.467
Drexel †	4	–	5	.444	12	–	8	.600
William & Mary	4	–	6	.400	7	–	10	.412
Elon	4	–	7	.364	10	–	9	.526
Towson	3	–	9	.250	4	–	14	.222
UNC Wilmington	1	–	6	.143	7	–	10	.412
† 2021 CAA tournament winner

The 2020–21 CAA men's basketball season narked the 35th season of Colonial Athletic Association basketball, taking place between November 2020 and March 2021. The season began with practices in November 2020, followed by the start of the 2020–21 NCAA Division I men's basketball season in late November, delayed due to the COVID-19 pandemic. The season ended with the 2021 CAA men's basketball tournament.

== Head coaches ==
=== Coaching changes ===
- Takayo Siddle replaced C. B. McGrath as UNC Wilmington head coach.
- Mark Byington replaced Louis Rowe as James Madison head coach.

=== Coaches ===
Team	Head coach	Previous job	Year at school	Overall record	CAA record	CAA championships	NCAA Tournaments
College of Charleston	Earl Grant	Clemson (asst.)	7	118–79	62–46	1	1
Delaware	Martin Ingelsby	Notre Dame (asst.)	5	66–66	30–42	0	0
Drexel	Zach Spiker	Army	5	49–81	22–50	0	0
Elon	Mike Schrage	Ohio State (asst.)	2	13–21	7–11	0	0
Hofstra	Joe Mihalich	Niagara	8	141–92	77–47	1	0
James Madison	Mark Byington	Georgia Southern	1	0–0	0–0	0	0
Northeastern	Bill Coen	Boston College (asst.)	15	241–213	146–104	2	2
Towson	Pat Skerry	Pittsburgh (asst.)	10	143–150	80–80	0	0
UNC Wilmington	Takayo Siddle	NC State (asst.)	1	0–0	0–0	0	0
William & Mary	Dane Fischer	George Mason (asst.)	2	21–11	13–5	0	0

Notes:

- All records, appearances, titles, etc. are from time with current school only.
- Year at school includes 2020–21 season.
- Overall and CAA records are from time at current school and are through the end of the 2019–20 season.

== Preseason ==
=== Preseason poll ===
Rank	Team	Points
1	Hofstra (16)	290
2	Delaware (11)	270
3	Drexel (7)	242
4	Towson (4)	230
5	Elon	215
6	College of Charleston	196
7	Northeastern	167
8	UNC Wilmington	110
9	James Madison	101
10	William & Mary	69

() first place votes

=== Preseason All-Conference Teams ===
Award	Recipients
First Team	James Butler (Drexel); Isaac Kante (Hofstra); Matt Lewis (James Madison); Zane Martin (Towson); Camren Wynter (Drexel)
Second Team	Ryan Allen (Delaware); Kevin Anderson (Delaware); Brevin Galloway (Charleston); Hunter McIntosh (Elon); Tyson Walker (Northeastern)
Honorable Mention	Tareq Coburn (Hofstra); Luke Loewe (William & Mary); Jalen Ray (Hofstra); Jaylen Sims (UNCW); Payton Willis (Charleston); Hunter Woods (Elon)

Colonial Athletic Association Preseason Player of the Year: Matt Lewis (James Madison)

== Regular season ==
=== Rankings ===
Legend
Increase in ranking
Decrease in ranking
Not ranked previous week

		Pre	Wk 2	Wk 3	Wk 4	Wk 5	Wk 6	Wk 7	Wk 8	Wk 9	Wk 10	Wk 11	Wk 12	Wk 13	Wk 14	Wk 15	Wk 16	Wk 17	Wk 18	Wk 19	Final
College of Charleston	AP																				
College of Charleston	C																				
Delaware	AP																				
Delaware	C																				
Drexel	AP																				
Drexel	C																				
Elon	AP																				
Elon	C																				
Hofstra	AP																				
Hofstra	C																				
James Madison	AP																				
James Madison	C																				
Northeastern	AP																				
Northeastern	C																				
Towson	AP																				
Towson	C																				
UNC Wilmington	AP																				
UNC Wilmington	C																				
William & Mary	AP																				
William & Mary	C																				

=== Conference matrix ===
This table summarizes the head-to-head results between teams in conference play.

	Charleston	Delaware	Drexel	Elon	Hofstra	James Madison	Northeastern	Towson	UNC Wilmington	William & Mary
vs. Charleston	–	1–1	0–2	1–1	0–0	0–0	2–0	0–2	0–0	0–0
vs. Delaware	1–1	–	0–0	0–2	1–1	0–0	0–0	0–0	1–1	1–0
vs. Drexel	2–0	0–0	–	0–0	1–1	1–1	0–0	0–0	0–0	1–2
vs. Elon	1–1	2–0	0–0	–	0–0	2–0	2–0	0–0	0–0	0–2
vs. Hofstra	0–0	1–1	1–1	0–0	–	2–0	2–0	0–2	0–2	0–2
vs. James Madison	0–0	0–0	0–1	0–2	0–2	–	1–1	0–2	0–0	0–0
vs. Northeastern	0–2	0–0	0–0	0–2	0–2	1–1	–	1–1	0–0	0–0
vs. Towson	2–0	0–0	0–0	0–0	2–0	2–0	1–1	–	0–2	2–0
vs. UNC Wilmington	0–0	1–1	0–0	0–0	2–0	0–0	0–0	2–0	–	0–0
vs. William & Mary	0–0	0–1	2–1	2–0	2–0	0–0	0–0	0–2	0–0	–
Total	6–4	5–4	3–5	3–7	8–6	8–2	8–2	3–9	1–5	4–6

== Postseason ==
=== NCAA tournament ===
The CAA had one bid to the 2021 NCAA Division I men's basketball tournament, that being the automatic bid of Drexel by winning the conference tournament.

Seed	Region	School	First Four	First round	Second round	Sweet 16	Elite Eight	Final Four	Championship
16	Midwest	Drexel	Bye	Eliminated by (1) Illinois 49–78					
Bids		W-L (%):	0–0 (–)	0–1 (.000)	0–0 (–)	0–0 (–)	0–0 (–)	0–0 (–)	TOTAL: 0–1 (.000)

== Awards and honors ==
=== Regular season ===
==== CAA Player-of-the-Week ====
- Nov. 30 – Jaylen Sims (UNCW)
- Dec. 7 – Camren Wynter (Drexel)
- Dec. 14 – Tyson Walker (Northeastern)
- Dec. 21 – Jalen Ray (Hofstra)
- Dec. 28 – Jalen Ray (Hofstra) (2)
- Jan. 4 – Isaac Kante (Hofstra)
- Jan. 11 – Tyson Walker (Northeastern) (2)
- Jan. 18 – Matt Lewis (James Madison), Dylan Painter (Delaware)
- Jan. 25 – Tareq Coburn (Hofstra)
- Feb. 1 – Connor Kochera (William & Mary)
- Feb. 8 – Zep Jasper (Charleston)
- Feb. 15 – Tyson Walker (Northeastern) (3)
- Feb. 22 – Darius Burford (Elon)
- Mar. 1 – Camren Wynter (Drexel) (2)

==== CAA Rookie-of-the-Week ====
- Nov. 30 – Connor Kochera (William & Mary)
- Dec. 7 – Kvonn Cramer (Hofstra)
- Dec. 14 – Jahmyl Telfort (Northeastern)
- Dec. 21 – Yuri Covington (William & Mary)
- Dec. 28 – Kvonn Cramer (Hofstra) (2)
- Jan. 4 – Jahmyl Telfort (Northeastern) (2)
- Jan. 11 – Justin Amadi (James Madison)
- Jan. 18 – Andrew Carr (Delaware)
- Jan. 25 – Jahmyl Telfort (Northeastern) (3)
- Feb. 1 – Kvonn Cramer (Hofstra) (3)
- Feb. 8 – Terell Strickland (James Madison)
- Feb. 15 – Terrence Edwards (James Madison)
- Feb. 22 – Darius Burford (Elon)
- Mar. 1 – Darius Burford (Elon) (2)

=== Postseason ===
==== CAA All-Conference Teams and Awards ====
Award	Recipients
Player of the Year	Matt Lewis (James Madison)
Coach of the Year	Mark Byington (James Madison)
Rookie of the Year	Connor Kochera (William & Mary)
Defensive Player of the Year	Tyson Walker (Northeastern)
Sixth Man of the Year	Jahmyl Telfort (Northeastern)
Dean Ehlers Leadership Award	Tareq Coburn (Hofstra)
Scholar-Athlete of the Year	Tareq Coburn (Hofstra)
First Team	Matt Lewis (James Madison); Dylan Painter (Delaware); Jalen Ray (Hofstra); Tyson Walker (Northeastern); Camren Wynter (Drexel)
Second Team	Zep Jasper (Charleston); Isaac Kante (Hofstra); Luke Loewe (William & Mary); Zane Martin (Towson); Hunter McIntosh (Elon)
Third Team	Ryan Allen (Delaware); James Butler (Drexel); Tareq Coburn (Hofstra); Vado Morse (James Madison); Mike Okauru (UNCW)
All-Defensive Team	Mehkel Harvey (William & Mary); Zep Jasper (Charleston); Luke Loewe (William & Mary); Dylan Painter (Delaware); Charles Thompson (Towson); Tyson Walker (Northeastern)
All-Rookie Team	Justin Amadi (James Madison); Darius Burford (Elon); Kvonn Cramer (Hofstra); Connor Kochera (William & Mary); Jahmyl Telfort (Northeastern)

== Attendance ==
Team	Arena	Capacity	Game 1	Game 2	Game 3	Game 4	Game 5	Game 6	Game 7	Game 8	Total	Average	% of Capacity
Team	Arena	Capacity	Game 9	Game 10	Game 11	Game 12	Game 13	Game 14	Game 15	Game 16	Total	Average	% of Capacity
Charleston	TD Arena	5,100											0%
Delaware	Bob Carpenter Center	5,100											0%
Drexel	Daskalakis Athletic Center	2,509	0	0	0	0	0				0	0	0%
Elon	Schar Center	5,100											0%
Hofstra	Hofstra Arena	5,023											0%
James Madison	Harrisonburg, VA	8,500											0%
Northeastern	Matthews Arena	6,000											0%
Towson	SECU Arena	5,200											0%
UNC Wilmington	Trask Coliseum	5,200											0%
William & Mary	Kaplan Arena	8,600											0%
