= 2020–21 Charleston Cougars men's basketball team =

American college basketball season

2020–21 Charleston Cougars men's basketball
- Conference: Colonial Athletic Association
- Record: 9–10 (6–4 CAA)
- Head coach: Earl Grant (7th season)
- Associate head coach: J.D. Powell
- Assistant coaches: Eric Wilson; Mantoris Robinson
- Home arena: TD Arena

2020–21 CAA men's basketball standings
	Conf.				Overall
Team	W		L	PCT	W		L	PCT
James Madison	8	–	2	.800	13	–	7	.650
Northeastern	8	–	2	.800	10	–	9	.526
Charleston	6	–	4	.600	9	–	10	.474
Hofstra	8	–	6	.571	13	–	10	.565
Delaware	5	–	4	.556	7	–	8	.467
Drexel †	4	–	5	.444	12	–	8	.600
William & Mary	4	–	6	.400	7	–	10	.412
Elon	4	–	7	.364	10	–	9	.526
Towson	3	–	9	.250	4	–	14	.222
UNC Wilmington	1	–	6	.143	7	–	10	.412
† 2021 CAA tournament winner

The 2020–21 College of Charleston Cougars men's basketball team represented the College of Charleston in the 2020–21 NCAA Division I men's basketball season. The Cougars, led by seventh-year head coach Earl Grant, play their home games at the TD Arena in Charleston, South Carolina as members of the Colonial Athletic Association. In a season limited due to the ongoing COVID-19 pandemic, the Cougars finished the season 9–10, 6–4 CAA play to finish in third place. They lost in the quarterfinals of the CAA tournament to Drexel.

== Previous season ==
The Cougars finished the 2019–20 season 17–14, 11–7 in CAA play to finish in a tie for fourth place. They lost in the quarterfinals of the CAA tournament to Delaware.

== Offseason ==
=== Departures ===
Name	Number	Pos.	Height	Weight	Year	Hometown	Reason for departure
Jaylen Richard	0	G	6'4"	175	Sophomore	Durham, NC	Entered transfer portal
Grant Riller	1	G	6'3"	195	RS Senior	Ocoee, FL	Declared for the 2020 NBA draft; Drafted 56th overall by the Charlotte Hornets
Quan McCluney	13	G	6'6"	200	Sophomore	Gastonia, NC	Trandferred to Queens (NC)
Sam Miller	20	F	6'9"	240	Senior	Arlington, VA	Graduated
Trevon Reddish	23	G	6'4"	195	Senior	Carrollton, GA	Transferred to Presbyterian
Jaylen McManus	24	F	6'7"	230	Senior	Charlotte, NC	Graduated
Zach Rabinowitz	31	G	6'2"	200	Senior	Charlotte, NC	Walk on; Graduated

=== Incoming transfers ===
Name	Number	Pos.	Height	Weight	Year	Hometown	Previous School
Payton Willis	0	G	6'4"	190	Senior	Fayetteville, Arkansas	Minnesota
Lorenzo Edwards	21	F	6'8"	215	Senior	Lake Forest, Illinois	Saint Joseph's

=== 2020 recruiting class ===
College recruiting information
Name	Hometown	School	Height	Weight	Commit date
D'Avian Houston; PG	Bellaire, Texas	Episcopal High School	6 ft 1 in (1.85 m)	185 lb (84 kg)	
D'Avian Houston; PG	Recruit ratings: Scout: Rivals: (NR)				
RJ Ogom; PF	Chicago, Ill.	Homewood-Flossmoor High School	6 ft 5 in (1.96 m)	210 lb (95 kg)	
RJ Ogom; PF	Recruit ratings: Scout: Rivals: (NR)				
Overall recruit ranking:
Note: In many cases, Scout, Rivals, 247Sports, On3, and ESPN may conflict in their listings of height and weight.; In these cases, the average was taken. ESPN grades are on a 100-point scale.; Sources: "2020 Team Ranking". Rivals.

== Roster ==
2020–21 College of Charleston Cougars men's basketball team
Players
Coaches

Pos.	#	Name	Height	Weight	Year	Previous school	Hometown
G	0	Payton Willis	6 ft 4 in (1.93 m)	190 lb (86 kg)	Sr	Minnesota	Fayetteville, Arkansas
G	2	D'Avian Houston	6 ft 1 in (1.85 m)	215 lb (98 kg)	Fr	Episcopal High School	Houston, Texas
F	3	DeAngelo Epps	6 ft 5 in (1.96 m)	200 lb (91 kg)	So	Carmel Christian School (NC)	Charlotte, North Carolina
F	4	Dontavius King	6 ft 7 in (2.01 m)	240 lb (109 kg)	RS Fr	Potter's House Christian Academy	Greenville, South Carolina
G	5	Brenden Tucker	6 ft 3 in (1.91 m)	180 lb (82 kg)	So	Dacula High School	Lawrenceville, Georgia
G/F	10	Cameron Copeland	6 ft 7 in (2.01 m)	185 lb (84 kg)	Jr	McLennan Community College	Douglasville, Georgia
C	11	Samba Ndiaye	6 ft 9 in (2.06 m)	240 lb (109 kg)	RS Jr	Sunrise Christian Academy	Thiès, Senegal
G	12	Zep Jasper	6 ft 1 in (1.85 m)	170 lb (77 kg)	Jr	Laney High School	Augusta, Georgia
F	14	Keegan Harvey	6 ft 11 in (2.11 m)	220 lb (100 kg)	Fr	Montverde Academy	Newcastle, Australia
F	21	Lorenzo Edwards	6 ft 8 in (2.03 m)	215 lb (98 kg)	Sr	Saint Joseph's	Lake Forest, Illinois
F	23	RJ Ogom	6 ft 5 in (1.96 m)	240 lb (109 kg)	Fr	Homewood-Flossmoor High School	Chicago, Illinois
G	32	Jeffrey Pizano-McInnis	6 ft 1 in (1.85 m)	175 lb (79 kg)	So	Marvin Ridge High School	Moline, Illinois
F/C	33	Osinachi Smart	6 ft 8 in (2.03 m)	240 lb (109 kg)	Sr	New Garden Friends School	Umuahia, Nigeria
G	55	Brevin Galloway	6 ft 2 in (1.88 m)	220 lb (100 kg)	Sr	Seneca High School	Anderson, South Carolina

Head coach

- Earl Grant (Georgia College)

Assistant coach(es)

- J.D. Powell (Clemson)
- Eric Wilson (Western Carolina)
- Mantoris Robinson (Winthrop)

Legend

- (C) Team captain
- (S) Suspended
- (I) Ineligible
- (W) Walk-on
- Injured
- Current redshirt

Roster
Last update: February 1, 2021

== Schedule and results ==
Date time, TV	Rank^{#}	Opponent^{#}	Result	Record	Site (attendance) city, state
Regular season
November 25, 2020*; 6:00 pm, ACCN		at No. 16 North Carolina	L 60–79	0–1	Dean Smith Center; Chapel Hill, NC
November 28, 2020*; 1:00 pm, FloSports		Limestone	W 99–59	1–1	TD Arena (1,439); Charleston, SC
December 2, 2020*; 7:00 pm, FloSports		No. 19 Richmond	Canceled		TD Arena; Charleston, SC
December 5, 2020*; 2:00 pm, FloSports		Furman	L 57–81	1–2	TD Arena (1,453); Charleston, SC
December 9, 2020*; 7:00 pm, FloSports		Marshall	L 72–84	1–3	TD Arena (1,419); Charleston, SC
December 11, 2020*; 7:00 pm, FloSports		South Carolina State	W 90–63	2–3	TD Arena (1,361); Charleston, SC
December 18, 2020*; 7:00 pm, FloSports		Western Carolina	L 70–76 ^{OT}	2–4	TD Arena (1,471); Charleston, SC
December 21, 2020*; 7:00 pm, ESPN+		at Georgia State	L 55–72	2–5	GSU Sports Arena (630); Atlanta, GA
January 2, 2021; 2:00 pm, FloSports		at Delaware	L 67–70	2–6 (0–1)	Bob Carpenter Center; Newark, DE
January 3, 2021; 2:00 pm, FloSports		at Delaware	W 66–59	3–6 (1–1)	Bob Carpenter Center; Newark, DE
January 9, 2021; 1:00 pm, FloSports		Drexel	W 61–60	4–6 (2–1)	TD Arena (1,420); Charleston, SC
January 10, 2021; 1:00 pm, FloSports		Drexel	W 73–68	5–6 (3–1)	TD Arena (1,410); Charleston, SC
January 16, 2021; 1:00 pm, FloSports		Northeastern	L 62–67	5–7 (3–2)	TD Arena (1,530); Charleston, SC
January 17, 2021; 1:00 pm, FloSports		Northeastern	L 66–68	5–8 (3–3)	TD Arena (1,451); Charleston, SC
January 23, 2021; 1:00 pm, FloSports		at William & Mary	Postponed		Kaplan Arena; Williamsburg, VA
January 24, 2021; 1:00 pm, FloSports		at William & Mary	Postponed		Kaplan Arena; Williamsburg, VA
January 30, 2021; 2:00 pm, FloSports		at James Madison	Postponed		Atlantic Union Bank Center; Harrisonburg, VA
January 31, 2021; 2:00 pm, FloSports		at James Madison	Postponed		Atlantic Union Bank Center; Harrisonburg, VA
February 6, 2021; 1:00 pm, FloSports		Towson	W 90–88 ^{2OT}	6–8 (4–3)	TD Arena (1,493); Charleston, SC
February 7, 2021; 1:00 pm, FloSports		Towson	W 66–53	7–8 (5–3)	TD Arena (1,445); Charleston, SC
February 13, 2021; 1:00 pm, FloSports		Elon	W 71–53	8–8 (6–3)	TD Arena (1,502); Charleston, SC
February 14, 2021; 1:00 pm, FloSports		Elon	L 55–66	8–9 (6–4)	TD Arena (1,467); Charleston, SC
February 20, 2021*; 1:00 pm		Columbus State	W 86–83	9–9	TD Arena (895); Charleston, SC
CAA tournament
March 7, 2021; 9:30 pm, FloSports	(3)	vs. (6) Drexel; Quarterfinals	L 75–80	9–10	Atlantic Union Bank Center (250); Harrisonburg, VA
*Non-conference game. ^{#}Rankings from AP Poll. (#) Tournament seedings in parentheses. All times are in Eastern.
