= 2020–21 William & Mary Tribe men's basketball team =

American college basketball season

2020–21 William & Mary Tribe men's basketball
- Conference: Colonial Athletic Association
- Record: 7–10 (4–6 CAA)
- Head coach: Dane Fischer (2nd season)
- Assistant coaches: Mike Howland; Jason Kemp; Julian Boatner
- Home arena: Kaplan Arena

2020–21 CAA men's basketball standings
	Conf.				Overall
Team	W		L	PCT	W		L	PCT
James Madison	8	–	2	.800	13	–	7	.650
Northeastern	8	–	2	.800	10	–	9	.526
Charleston	6	–	4	.600	9	–	10	.474
Hofstra	8	–	6	.571	13	–	10	.565
Delaware	5	–	4	.556	7	–	8	.467
Drexel †	4	–	5	.444	12	–	8	.600
William & Mary	4	–	6	.400	7	–	10	.412
Elon	4	–	7	.364	10	–	9	.526
Towson	3	–	9	.250	4	–	14	.222
UNC Wilmington	1	–	6	.143	7	–	10	.412
† 2021 CAA tournament winner

The 2020–21 William & Mary Tribe men's basketball team represented the College of William & Mary in the 2020–21 NCAA Division I men's basketball season. The Tribe, led by second-year head coach Dane Fischer, played their home games at Kaplan Arena in Williamsburg, Virginia as members of the Colonial Athletic Association.

== Previous season ==
The Tribe finished the 2019–20 season 21–11, 13–5 in CAA play to finish in second place. They were upset by Elon in the quarterfinals of the CAA tournament.

== Offseason ==
=== Departures ===
Name	Number	Pos.	Height	Weight	Year	Hometown	Reason for departure
Jihar Williams	0	G	6'5"	201	Junior	Baltimore, Maryland	Transferred to Frostburg State
Tyler Hamilton	2	G	6'4"	210	RS senior	Atlanta, Georgia	Graduated
Bryce Barnes	5	G	5'11"	189	Senior	Chicago, Illinois	Graduated
Andy Van Vliet	11	F/C	7'0"	231	RS senior	Antwerp, Belgium	Graduated
Nathan Knight	13	C	6'10"	253	Senior	Syracuse, New York	Declared for the NBA draft

=== 2020 recruiting class ===
College recruiting
Name	Hometown	School	Height	Weight	Commit date
Connor Kochera; SF	Arlington Heights, IL	Saint Viator High School	6 ft 4 in (1.93 m)	N/A	Jul 3, 2019
Connor Kochera; SF	Recruit ratings: Scout: Rivals: (NR)				
Jake Milkereit; SG	Dallas, TX	Bishop Lynch High School	6 ft 3 in (1.91 m)	185 lb (84 kg)	Sep 25, 2019
Jake Milkereit; SG	Recruit ratings: Scout: Rivals: (NR)				
Overall recruit ranking: 247Sports: 251
Note: In many cases, Scout, Rivals, 247Sports, On3, and ESPN may conflict in their listings of height and weight.; In these cases, the average was taken. ESPN grades are on a 100-point scale.; Sources: "2020 Team Ranking". Rivals.

== Roster ==
2020–21 William & Mary Tribe men's basketball team
Players
Coaches

Pos.	#	Name	Height	Weight	Year	Previous school	Hometown
F	0	Kurt Samuels Jr.	6 ft 5 in (1.96 m)	230 lb (104 kg)	Fr	St. Stephen's & St. Agnes School	Alexandria, Virginia
G	1	Jake Milkereit	6 ft 5 in (1.96 m)	200 lb (91 kg)	Fr	Bishop Lynch High School	Dallas, Texas
G	4	Miodrag Dronjak	6 ft 3 in (1.91 m)	196 lb (89 kg)	Sr	Richard Bland College	Kladovo, Serbia
G	5	Yuri Covington	6 ft 1 in (1.85 m)	192 lb (87 kg)	Fr	National Christian Academy	Wilkes-Barre, Pennsylvania
G	10	Rainers Hermanovskis	6 ft 4 in (1.93 m)	201 lb (91 kg)	So	Riga Secondary School Nr.49	Smiltene, Latvia
G	11	Thornton Scott	6 ft 5 in (1.96 m)	185 lb (84 kg)	Jr	Vermont Academy	Glen Cove, New York
G	12	Luke Loewe	6 ft 4 in (1.93 m)	186 lb (84 kg)	Sr	Fond du Lac High School	Fond du Lac, Wisconsin
G	15	Miguel Ayesa	6 ft 5 in (1.96 m)	201 lb (91 kg)	So	National Top Sports Institute	Madrid, Spain
F	21	Quinn Blair	6 ft 7 in (2.01 m)	225 lb (102 kg)	Jr	Dearborn Divine Child High School	Livonia, Michigan
G/F	22	Thatcher Stone	6 ft 6 in (1.98 m)	200 lb (91 kg)	So	Dexter Southfield School	Medford, Massachusetts
G	23	Connor Kochera	6 ft 5 in (1.96 m)	200 lb (91 kg)	Fr	Saint Viator High School	Arlington Heights, Illinois
G	24	Austin Washburn	6 ft 4 in (1.93 m)	175 lb (79 kg)	Jr	Powhatan High School	Powhatan, Virginia
F/C	30	Mehkel Harvey	6 ft 9 in (2.06 m)	225 lb (102 kg)	Jr	Ocean View High School	Huntington Beach, California
F	35	Ben Wight	6 ft 9 in (2.06 m)	205 lb (93 kg)	RS Fr	Thomas Worthington High School	Columbus, Ohio

Head coach

- Dane Fischer (Ithaca)

Assistant coach(es)

- Mike Howland (DePauw)
- Jason Kemp (UW–La Crosse)
- Julian Boatner (William & Mary)

Legend

- (C) Team captain
- (S) Suspended
- (I) Ineligible
- (W) Walk-on
- Injured
- Current redshirt

Roster
Last update: January 30, 2021

== Schedule and results ==
Date time, TV	Rank^{#}	Opponent^{#}	Result	Record	Site (attendance) city, state
Non-conference regular season
November 28, 2020*; 7:00 pm, ODUSports.com		at Old Dominion; Rivalry	L 78–86	0–1	Chartway Arena (250); Norfolk, VA
November 30, 2020*; 7:00 pm, ACCN		at NC State	Canceled		Reynolds Coliseum; Raleigh, NC
December 3, 2020*; 7:00 pm, FloHoops		Hampton	Postponed		Kaplan Arena; Williamsburg, VA
December 9, 2020*; 7:00 pm		at Norfolk State	Canceled		Joseph G. Echols Memorial Hall; Norfolk, VA
December 14, 2020*; 7:00 pm, CBSSN		at George Washington	W 85–84 ^{OT}	1–1	Charles E. Smith Center; Washington, D.C.
December 16, 2020*; 6:00 pm, ESPN+		at Hampton	W 75–58	2–1	Hampton Convocation Center; Hampton, VA
December 19, 2020*; 2:00 pm, FloHoops		High Point	L 49–71	2–2	Kaplan Arena; Williamsburg, VA
December 22, 2020*; 2:00 pm, ACCN		at No. 16 Virginia	L 40–76	2–3	John Paul Jones Arena (250); Charlottesville, VA
CAA regular season
January 2, 2021; 2:00 pm, FloHoops		at Hofstra	L 56–61	2–4 (0–1)	Mack Sports Complex; Hempstead, NY
January 3, 2021; 2:00 pm, FloHoops		at Hofstra	L 73–82	2–5 (0–2)	Mack Sports Complex; Hempstead, NY
January 9, 2021; 2:00 pm, Cox Yurview/FloHoops		Delaware	W 67–62	3–5 (1–2)	Kaplan Arena; Williamsburg, VA
January 10, 2021; 2:00 pm, Cox Yurview/FloHoops		Delaware	Postponed		Kaplan Arena; Williamsburg, VA
January 16, 2021; 1:00 pm, FloHoops		at Drexel	L 58–82	3–6 (1–3)	Daskalakis Athletic Center; Philadelphia, PA
January 17, 2021; 1:00 pm, FloHoops		at Drexel	W 69–64	4–6 (2–3)	Daskalakis Athletic Center; Philadelphia, PA
January 23, 2021; 1:00 pm, FloHoops		Drexel	L 64–79	4–7 (2–4)	Kaplan Arena; Williamsburg, VA
January 23, 2021; 1:00 pm, Cox Yurview/FloHoops		College of Charleston	Postponed		Kaplan Arena; Williamsburg, VA
January 24, 2021; 1:00 pm, Cox Yurview/FloHoops		College of Charleston	Postponed		Kaplan Arena; Williamsburg, VA
January 30, 2021; 1:00 pm, FloHoops		at Towson	W 84–74	5–7 (3–4)	SECU Arena; Towson, MD
January 31, 2021; 1:00 pm, FloHoops		at Towson	W 75–74	6–7 (4–4)	SECU Arena; Towson, MD
February 6, 2021; 2:00 pm, Cox Yurview/FloHoops		James Madison	Postponed		Kaplan Arena; Williamsburg, VA
February 7, 2021; 2:00 pm, Cox Yurview/FloHoops		James Madison	Postponed		Kaplan Arena; Williamsburg, VA
February 13, 2021; 1:00 pm, FloHoops		at UNC Wilmington	Postponed		Trask Coliseum; Wilmington, NC
February 14, 2021; 1:00 pm, FloHoops		at UNC Wilmington	Postponed		Trask Coliseum; Wilmington, NC
February 20, 2021; 2:00 pm, Cox Yurview/FloHoops		Elon	L 54–75	6–8 (4–5)	Kaplan Arena; Williamsburg, VA
February 22, 2021; 7:00 pm, FloHoops		at Elon	L 54–73	6–9 (4–6)	Schar Center; Elon, NC
CAA Tournament
March 6, 2021; 7:00 pm, FloHoops	(7)	vs. (10) UNC Wilmington; First round	W 73–60	7–9	Atlantic Union Bank Center (250); Harrisonburg, VA
March 7, 2021; 6:00 pm, FloHoops	(7)	vs. (2) Northeastern; Quarterfinals	L 47–63	7–10	Atlantic Union Bank Center (250); Harrisonburg, VA
*Non-conference game. ^{#}Rankings from AP Poll. (#) Tournament seedings in parentheses. All times are in Eastern.
