= 2020–21 Elon Phoenix men's basketball team =

American college basketball season

2020–21 Elon Phoenix men's basketball
- Conference: Colonial Athletic Association
- Record: 10–9 (4–7 CAA)
- Head coach: Mike Schrage (2nd season)
- Assistant coaches: Jonathan Holmes; Mark Adams; Allen Payne
- Home arena: Schar Center

2020–21 CAA men's basketball standings
	Conf.				Overall
Team	W		L	PCT	W		L	PCT
James Madison	8	–	2	.800	13	–	7	.650
Northeastern	8	–	2	.800	10	–	9	.526
Charleston	6	–	4	.600	9	–	10	.474
Hofstra	8	–	6	.571	13	–	10	.565
Delaware	5	–	4	.556	7	–	8	.467
Drexel †	4	–	5	.444	12	–	8	.600
William & Mary	4	–	6	.400	7	–	10	.412
Elon	4	–	7	.364	10	–	9	.526
Towson	3	–	9	.250	4	–	14	.222
UNC Wilmington	1	–	6	.143	7	–	10	.412
† 2021 CAA tournament winner

The 2020–21 Elon Phoenix men's basketball team represented Elon University during the 2020–21 NCAA Division I men's basketball season. The Phoenix, led by second-year head coach Mike Schrage, played as seventh-year members of the Colonial Athletic Association (CAA) and played their home games at the Schar Center in Elon, North Carolina.

== Previous season ==
The Phoenix finished the 2019–20 season 13–21, 7–11 in CAA play, to finish in seventh place. They played in the 2020 CAA men's basketball tournament, where they defeated 10-seed James Madison in the first round, upset 2-seed William & Mary in the quarterfinals, and lost to 6-seed Northeastern in the semifinals.

== Offseason ==
=== Departures ===
Name	Number	Pos.	Height	Weight	Year	Hometown	Reason for departure
Seth Fuller	3	G	5'11"	180	RS Junior	Dublin, OH	Graduated; left team
Marcus Sheffield II	4	G	6'5"	180	RS Senior	Alpharetta, GA	Graduated
Andy Pack	21	G	6'4"	200	Sophomore	Summerfield, NC	Transferred to Bridgewater College
Duje Radja	42	F/C	6'8"	235	Junior	Split, Croatia	Left team

=== Incoming transfers ===
Name	Number	Pos.	Height	Weight	Year	Hometown	Previous school
Charles Mendys	3	G	6'0"	180	RS Junior	Carrboro, NC	Roanoke College
Ikenna Ndugba	11	G	6'0"	186	Graduate Student	Boston, MA	Bryant

=== 2020 recruiting class ===
College recruiting information
Name	Hometown	School	Height	Weight	Commit date
Darius Burford; PG	Bolingbrook, IL	Bolingbrook	6 ft 0 in (1.83 m)	165 lb (75 kg)	Apr 18, 2020
Darius Burford; PG	Recruit ratings: Scout: Rivals: ESPN: (NR)				
Michael Graham; PF	Brooklyn, NY	Xaverian	6 ft 7 in (2.01 m)	195 lb (88 kg)	Jul 7, 2020
Michael Graham; PF	Recruit ratings: Scout: Rivals: ESPN: (NR)				
Brandon Harris; SG	Savannah, GA	Johnson	6 ft 6 in (1.98 m)	185 lb (84 kg)	Jun 12, 2019
Brandon Harris; SG	Recruit ratings: Scout: Rivals: ESPN: (NR)				
JaDun Michael; SF	Burlington, NC	The Burlington School	6 ft 5 in (1.96 m)	185 lb (84 kg)	Apr 6, 2020
JaDun Michael; SF	Recruit ratings: Scout: Rivals: ESPN: (NR)				
Overall recruit ranking:
Note: In many cases, Scout, Rivals, 247Sports, On3, and ESPN may conflict in their listings of height and weight.; In these cases, the average was taken. ESPN grades are on a 100-point scale.; Sources: "2020 Team Ranking". Rivals.

== Roster ==
2020–21 Elon Phoenix men's basketball team
Players
Coaches

Pos.	#	Name	Height	Weight	Year	Previous school	Hometown
G	0	Hunter McIntosh	6 ft 3 in (1.91 m)	180 lb (82 kg)	So	Greater Atlanta Christian School	Snellville, GA
F	1	Chuck Hannah	6 ft 6 in (1.98 m)	230 lb (104 kg)	Jr	Northfield Mount Hermon School	Boston, MA
F	2	JaDun Michael	6 ft 5 in (1.96 m)	185 lb (84 kg)	Fr	The Burlington School	Burlington, NC
G	3	Charles Mendys	6 ft 0 in (1.83 m)	180 lb (82 kg)	RS Jr	Roanoke College	Carrboro, NC
G	4	Brandon Harris	6 ft 6 in (1.98 m)	188 lb (85 kg)	Fr	Potters House Christian	Savannah, GA
F	5	Federico Poser	6 ft 9 in (2.06 m)	245 lb (111 kg)	Jr	I.I.S.S. Marco Fanno School	Mareno di Piave, Italy
G	10	Kris Wooten	6 ft 3 in (1.91 m)	190 lb (86 kg)	So	Arendell Parrott Academy	Kinston, NC
G	11	Ikenna Ndugba	6 ft 0 in (1.83 m)	186 lb (84 kg)	GS	Bryant	Boston, MA
G	12	Darius Burford	6 ft 0 in (1.83 m)	160 lb (73 kg)	Fr	Bolingbrook High School	Bolingbrook, IL
G/F	13	Jerald Gillens-Butler	6 ft 4 in (1.93 m)	230 lb (104 kg)	RS Jr	Butler	Orlando, FL
G/F	14	Zac Ervin	6 ft 5 in (1.96 m)	215 lb (98 kg)	So	Gate City High School	Gate City, VA
G	20	Lars Nilsen	6 ft 4 in (1.93 m)	200 lb (91 kg)	Fr	The Burlington School	Skien, Norway
F	21	Michael Graham	6 ft 8 in (2.03 m)	215 lb (98 kg)	Fr	Xaverian High School	Brooklyn, NY
G	23	Ben Daugherty (W)	6 ft 3 in (1.91 m)	190 lb (86 kg)	So	La Jolla Country Day School	Chagrin Falls, OH
G/F	25	Hunter Woods	6 ft 6 in (1.98 m)	193 lb (88 kg)	So	John Muir HS	Pasadena, CA
F	33	Simon Wright	6 ft 7 in (2.01 m)	215 lb (98 kg)	Sr	Hopkins HS	Minneapolis, MN

Head coach

- Mike Schrage (Indiana)

Assistant coach(es)

- Jonathan Holmes (North Carolina)
- Mark Adams (St. John Fisher)
- Allen Payne (Auburn)

Legend

- (C) Team captain
- (S) Suspended
- (I) Ineligible
- (W) Walk-on
- Injured
- Current redshirt

Roster
Last update: August 15, 2024

== Schedule and results ==
Elon has had to cancel three games and postpone nine games due to COVID-19.

Date time, TV	Rank^{#}	Opponent^{#}	Result	Record	High points	High rebounds	High assists	Site (attendance) city, state
Non-conference season
November 25, 2020; 7:00 p.m.		NC Wesleyan	W 82–52	1–0	19 – Gillens-Butler	9 – Gillens-Butler	4 – McIntosh	Schar Center (0); Elon, NC
November 28, 2020; 4:00 p.m.		High Point	W 76–75	2–0	21 – McIntosh	6 – Gillens-Butler	6 – Wooten	Schar Center (0); Elon, NC
December 12, 2020; 3:00 p.m.		Campbell	W 66–56	3–0	23 – McIntosh	7 – tied	3 – tied	Schar Center (0); Elon, NC
December 19, 2020; 1:00 p.m.		at UNC Greensboro	L 64–71	3–1	19 – Woods	8 – Woods	3 – Ndugba	Schar Center (0); Elon, NC
CAA regular season
January 2, 2021; 12:00 p.m.		at Northeastern	L 52–75	3–2 (0–1)	16 – McIntosh	8 – Woods	2 – tied	Matthews Arena (0); Boston, MA
January 3, 2021; 12:00 p.m.		at Northeastern	L 58–66	3–3 (0–2)	17 – McIntosh	9 – Woods	4 – Hannah	Matthews Arena (0); Boston, MA
January 30, 2021; 2:00 p.m.		at Delaware	L 43–66	3–4 (0–3)	10 – McIntosh	6 – Woods	2 – tied	Bob Carpenter Center (0); Newark, DE
January 31, 2021; 2:00 p.m.		at Delaware	L 70–74	3–5 (0–4)	30 – McIntosh	7 – Woods	7 – McIntosh	Bob Carpenter Center (0); Newark, DE
February 3, 2021; 4:00 p.m.		at James Madison	L 57–78	3–6 (0–5)	19 – McIntosh	10 – Woods	7 – Ndugba	Atlantic Union Bank Center (250); Harrisonburg, VA
February 9, 2021; 7:00 p.m.		James Madison	L 61–70	3–7 (0–6)	17 – Wright	13 – Woods	3 – Ndugba	Schar Center (0); Elon, NC
February 13, 2021; 2:00 p.m.		at College of Charleston	L 53–71	3–8 (0–7)	15 – Burford	6 – tied	3 – Ndugba	TD Arena (1,502); Charleston, SC
February 14, 2021; 2:00 p.m.		at College of Charleston	W 66–55	4–8 (1–7)	20 – McIntosh	6 – Burford	4 – Woods	TD Arena (1,467); Charleston, SC
February 20, 2021; 2:00 p.m.		at William & Mary	W 75–54	5–8 (2–7)	27 – Burford	8 – Ndugba	4 – Ndugba	Kaplan Arena (0); Williamsburg, VA
February 22, 2021; 7:00 p.m.		William & Mary	W 73–54	6–8 (3–7)	17 – Ndugba	6 – tied	4 – Ndugba	Schar Center (0); Elon, NC
February 27, 2021; 6:00 p.m.		at UNC Wilmington	W 80–77	7–8 (4–7)	23 – Burford	9 – Ndugba	4 – tied	Trask Coliseum (800); Wilmington, NC
CAA tournament
March 6, 2021; 3:00 p.m., FloSports	(8)	vs. (9) Towson; First round	W 69–48	8–8	13 – McIntosh	8 – Woods	4 – Ndugba	Atlantic Union Bank Center (250); Harrisonburg, VA
March 7, 2021; 2:30 p.m., FloSports	(8)	at (1) James Madison; Quarterfinals	W 72–71	9–8	24 – McIntosh	9 – McIntosh	6 – Ndugba	Atlantic Union Bank Center (250); Harrisonburg, VA
March 8, 2021; 6:00 p.m., CBSSN	(8)	vs. (4) Hofstra; Semifinals	W 76–58	10–8	19 – Burford	10 – Ndugba	6 – Burford	Atlantic Union Bank Center (250); Harrisonburg, VA
March 9, 2021; 7:00 p.m., CBSSN	(8)	vs. (6) Drexel; Championship	L 56–63	10–9	19 – McIntosh	5 – tied	4 – Ndugba	Atlantic Union Bank Center (250); Harrisonburg, VA
*Non-conference game. ^{#}Rankings from AP poll. (#) Tournament seedings in parentheses. All times are in Eastern.
