= 2020–21 James Madison Dukes men's basketball team =

American college basketball season

2020–21 James Madison Dukes men's basketball

CAA regular-season co-champions
- Conference: Colonial Athletic Association
- Record: 13–7 (8–2 CAA)
- Head coach: Mark Byington (1st season)
- Assistant coaches: Andrew Wilson; Xavier Joyner; Jon Cremins
- Home arena: Atlantic Union Bank Center

2020–21 CAA men's basketball standings
	Conf.				Overall
Team	W		L	PCT	W		L	PCT
James Madison	8	–	2	.800	13	–	7	.650
Northeastern	8	–	2	.800	10	–	9	.526
Charleston	6	–	4	.600	9	–	10	.474
Hofstra	8	–	6	.571	13	–	10	.565
Delaware	5	–	4	.556	7	–	8	.467
Drexel †	4	–	5	.444	12	–	8	.600
William & Mary	4	–	6	.400	7	–	10	.412
Elon	4	–	7	.364	10	–	9	.526
Towson	3	–	9	.250	4	–	14	.222
UNC Wilmington	1	–	6	.143	7	–	10	.412
† 2021 CAA tournament winner

The 2020–21 James Madison Dukes men's basketball team represented James Madison University in the 2020–21 NCAA Division I men's basketball season. The Dukes, led by first-year head coach Mark Byington, played their home games at the newly opened Atlantic Union Bank Center in Harrisonburg, Virginia as members of the Colonial Athletic Association (CAA). In a season limited due to the ongoing COVID-19 pandemic, they finished the season 13–7, 8–2 in CAA play, to earn a share of the regular-season championship. They lost in the quarterfinals of the CAA tournament to Elon.

Byington was named the CAA Coach of the Year while guard Matt Lewis was named the CAA Player of the Year.

== Previous season ==
The Dukes finished the 2019–20 season 9–21, 2–16 in CAA play, to finish in last place. They lost in the first round of the CAA tournament to Elon.

On March 9, 2020, the school announced that head coach Louis Rowe would not return as head coach for the Dukes. A few weeks later, the school named Georgia Southern head coach Mark Byington the Dukes' new head coach.

== Offseason ==
Guard Matt Lewis opted to test the waters in the 2020 NBA draft; however, he ultimately returned to the Dukes for his senior season.

=== Departures ===
Name	Number	Pos.	Height	Weight	Year	Hometown	Reason for departure
Antanee Pinkard	2	G	6' 4"	205	Senior	Lancaster, PA	Graduated
Deshon Parker	3	G	6' 4"	195	Sophomore	Huber Heights, OH	Transferred to Appalachian State
Zyon Dobbs	4	G	6' 3"	195	Freshman	Fairmont, WV	Transferred to Fairmont State
Darius Banks	5	G	6' 5"	220	Junior	St. Petersburg, FL	Transferred to Chattanooga
Quinn Richey	13	G	6' 5"	195	Freshman	Johns Creek, GA	Transferred to Samford
Dalton Jefferson	20	F	6' 7"	175	Freshman	Elkton, VA	Walk-on; didn't return
Dwight Wilson	24	F	6' 8"	250	Junior	Tallahassee, FL	Transferred to Ohio
Devon Flowers	35	F	6' 8"	215	RS Freshman	Hyattsville, MD	Transferred to Clark Atlanta

== Preseason ==
In the preseason CAA poll, the Dukes were picked to finish ninth while Matt Lewis was chosen the preseason CAA Player of the Year.

== Roster ==
2020–21 James Madison Dukes men's basketball team
Players
Coaches

Pos.	#	Name	Height	Weight	Year	Previous school	Hometown
F	0	Justin Amadi	6 ft 7 in (2.01 m)	220 lb (100 kg)	Fr	Paul M. Dorman High School	Greenville, SC
G	1	Matt Lewis (injured)	6 ft 5 in (1.96 m)	200 lb (91 kg)	Sr	Bishop O'Connell High School	Woodbridge, VA
G/F	2	T. J. Taylor	6 ft 6 in (1.98 m)	210 lb (95 kg)	Jr	Wyoming	Chesapeake, VA
G	4	Vado Morse	6 ft 0 in (1.83 m)	170 lb (77 kg)	Jr	Mount St. Mary's	Suitland, MD
G/F	5	Terrence Edwards Jr.	6 ft 6 in (1.98 m)	190 lb (86 kg)	Fr	Tucker High School	Atlanta, GA
G	10	Terell Strickland	6 ft 0 in (1.83 m)	170 lb (77 kg)	Fr	Scotland Campus Sports	Tampa, FL
F	11	Zach Jacobs	6 ft 8 in (2.03 m)	235 lb (107 kg)	Sr	Trinity Episcopal School	Richmond, VA
G	12	Tyce McNair	6 ft 1 in (1.85 m)	190 lb (86 kg)	Fr	East Rockingham High School	McGaheysville, VA
G	13	Jalen Hodge	6 ft 1 in (1.85 m)	180 lb (82 kg)	Jr	Louisiana–Monroe	O'Fallon, IL
G	14	Jayvis Harvey	6 ft 3 in (1.91 m)	210 lb (95 kg)	So	Southern Durham High School	Durham, NC
G	21	Hollman Smith	6 ft 0 in (1.83 m)	180 lb (82 kg)	Fr	Tilton School	Falls Church, VA
F	22	Julien Wooden	6 ft 8 in (2.03 m)	225 lb (102 kg)	So	Northside High School	Roanoke, VA
F	23	Michael Christmas	6 ft 6 in (1.98 m)	225 lb (102 kg)	So	Landstown High School	Virginia Beach, VA
F	35	Joel Mensah	6 ft 10 in (2.08 m)	220 lb (100 kg)	Jr	San Diego State	Accra, Ghana

Head coach

- Mark Byington (UNC Wilmington)

Assistant coach(es)

- Andrew Wilson (Florida State)
- Xavier Joyner (Husson)
- Jon Cremins (Valdosta State)

Legend

- (C) Team captain
- (S) Suspended
- (I) Ineligible
- (W) Walk-on
- Injured
- Current redshirt

Roster
Last update: February 28, 2021

== Schedule and results ==
Date time, TV	Rank^{#}	Opponent^{#}	Result	Record	Site (attendance) city, state
Regular season
November 25, 2020*; 12:00 p.m., FloHoops		Limestone University	W 89–55	1–0	Atlantic Union Bank Center (250); Harrisonburg, VA
November 27, 2020*; 12:00 p.m., FloHoops		Norfolk State	L 73–83	1–1	Atlantic Union Bank Center (250); Harrisonburg, VA
November 29, 2020*; 8:30 p.m., FloHoops		Radford	W 67–59	2–1	Atlantic Union Bank Center (250); Harrisonburg, VA
December 5, 2020*; 6:00 p.m.		Maryland	Canceled due to COVID-19		Atlantic Union Bank Center; Harrisonburg, VA
December 7, 2020*; 7:00 p.m.		Old Dominion	Canceled due to COVID-19		Atlantic Union Bank Center; Harrisonburg, VA
December 10, 2020*		Coppin State	Canceled due to COVID-19		Atlantic Union Bank Center; Harrisonburg, VA
December 12, 2020*; 11:00 a.m.		vs. George Mason	Canceled due to COVID-19		Siegel Center; Richmond, VA
December 19, 2020*; 1:00 p.m., ESPN+		at East Carolina	L 64–73	2–2	Williams Arena (73); Greenville, NC
December 20, 2020*; 5:00 p.m., FloHoops		Alice Lloyd	W 98–55	3–2	Atlantic Union Bank Center (250); Harrisonburg, VA
December 22, 2020*; 4:00 p.m., MASN/ESPN+		at VCU	L 81–82	3–3	Siegel Center (250); Richmond, VA
January 3, 2021*; 6:00 p.m., FloHoops		Morgan State	L 73–80	3–4	Atlantic Union Bank Center (250); Harrisonburg, VA
January 5, 2021*; 4:00 p.m., FloHoops		Florida Atlantic	W 79–70	4–4	Atlantic Union Bank Center (250); Harrisonburg, VA
January 10, 2021; 1:00 p.m., FloHoops		at UNC Wilmington	Postponed due to COVID-19		Trask Coliseum; Wilmington, NC
January 10, 2021*; 2:00 p.m., FloHoops		Chowan	W 100–76	5–4	Atlantic Union Bank Center (250); Harrisonburg, VA
January 16, 2021; 2:00 p.m., FloHoops		at Towson	W 81–72	6–4 (1–0)	SECU Arena; Towson, MD
January 23, 2021; 12:00 p.m., FloHoops		at Northeastern	L 62–73	6–5 (1–1)	Cabot Center; Boston, MA
January 24, 2021; 12:00 p.m., FloHoops		at Northeastern	W 79–72	7–5 (2–1)	Cabot Center; Boston, MA
January 27, 2021; 4:00 p.m., FloHoops		Towson	W 78–63	8–5 (3–1)	Atlantic Union Bank Center (250); Harrisonburg, VA
January 30, 2021; 2:00 p.m., FloHoops		College of Charleston	Postponed due to COVID-19		Atlantic Union Bank Center; Harrisonburg, VA
January 31, 2021; 2:00 p.m., NBCSW/FloHoops		College of Charleston	Postponed due to COVID-19		Atlantic Union Bank Center; Harrisonburg, VA
January 31, 2021; 2:00 p.m., FloHoops		Drexel	W 73–64	9–5 (4–1)	Atlantic Union Bank Center (250); Harrisonburg, VA
February 3, 2021; 4:00 p.m., NBCSW/FloHoops		Elon	W 78–57	10–5 (5–1)	Atlantic Union Bank Center (250); Harrisonburg, VA
February 6, 2021; 2:00 p.m., FloHoops		at William & Mary	Postponed due to COVID-19		Kaplan Arena; Williamsburg, VA
February 7, 2021; 2:00 p.m., FloHoops		at William & Mary	Postponed due to COVID-19		Kaplan Arena; Williamsburg, VA
February 9, 2021; 6:00 p.m., NBCSW/FloHoops		at Elon	W 70–61	11–5 (6–1)	Schar Center; Elon, NC
February 13, 2021; 2:00 p.m., NBCSW/FloHoops		Hofstra	W 93–89	12–5 (7–1)	Atlantic Union Bank Center (250); Harrisonburg, VA
February 14, 2021; 2:00 p.m., FloHoops		Hofstra	W 74–70	13–5 (8–1)	Atlantic Union Bank Center (250); Harrisonburg, VA
February 20, 2021; 6:00 p.m., FloHoops		at Delaware	Postponed due to COVID-19		Bob Carpenter Center; Newark, DE
February 21, 2021; 5:00 p.m., FloHoops		at Delaware	Postponed due to COVID-19		Bob Carpenter Center; Newark, DE
February 26, 2021; 6:00 p.m., FloHoops		Drexel	L 78–84	13–6 (8–2)	Atlantic Union Bank Center (250); Harrisonburg, VA
CAA tournament
March 7, 2021; 2:30 p.m., FloHoops	(1)	(8) Elon; Quarterfinals	L 71–72	13–7	Atlantic Union Bank Center (250); Harrisonburg, VA
*Non-conference game. ^{#}Rankings from AP poll. (#) Tournament seedings in parentheses. All times are in Eastern.
