= 2020–21 Drexel Dragons men's basketball team =

American college basketball season

2020–21 Drexel Dragons men's basketball

CAA Tournament champions

NCAA tournament, first round
- Conference: Colonial Athletic Association
- Record: 12–8 (4–5 CAA)
- Head coach: Zach Spiker (5th season)
- Assistant coaches: Paul Fortier (5th season); Justin Jennings (5th season); Rob O’Driscoll (5th season); Michael-Hakim Jordan (1st season)
- MVP: Camren Wynter
- Captains: James Butler; Camren Wynter
- Home arena: Daskalakis Athletic Center

2020–21 CAA men's basketball standings
	Conf.				Overall
Team	W		L	PCT	W		L	PCT
James Madison	8	–	2	.800	13	–	7	.650
Northeastern	8	–	2	.800	10	–	9	.526
Charleston	6	–	4	.600	9	–	10	.474
Hofstra	8	–	6	.571	13	–	10	.565
Delaware	5	–	4	.556	7	–	8	.467
Drexel †	4	–	5	.444	12	–	8	.600
William & Mary	4	–	6	.400	7	–	10	.412
Elon	4	–	7	.364	10	–	9	.526
Towson	3	–	9	.250	4	–	14	.222
UNC Wilmington	1	–	6	.143	7	–	10	.412
† 2021 CAA tournament winner

The 2020–21 Drexel Dragons men's basketball team represented Drexel University during the 2020–21 NCAA Division I men's basketball season. The Dragons, led by fifth-year head coach Zach Spiker, played their home games at the Daskalakis Athletic Center in Philadelphia, Pennsylvania as members of the Colonial Athletic Association.

In the 2020–21 season, the Dragons had many games postponed or cancelled due to the COVID-19 pandemic, and did not have fans in attendance for all home games.

They finished the season 12–8, 4–5 in CAA Play to finish in 6th place. They defeated Charleston, Northeastern, and Elon to be champions of the CAA tournament. They received the conference’s automatic bid to the NCAA tournament where they lost in the first round to Illinois.

== Previous season ==
The Dragons finished the 2019–20 season 14–19, 6–12 in CAA play to finish in 8th place. They lost to Hofstra in the CAA tournament quarterfinals.

== Offseason ==
On 14 July, 2020, Drexel announced the addition of Michael-Hakim Jordan as an assistant coach.

=== Departures ===
Name	Number	Pos.	Height	Weight	Year	Hometown	Notes
Kurk Lee Jr	1	G	5'9"	150	Senior	Baltimore, MD	Transferred to Alcorn State
Jarvis Doles	2	F	6'9"	215	Junior	Baltimore, MD	Transferred to Albany
Sam Green	4	F	6'6"	220	Junior	Bowie, MD	Transferred to Howard

=== Incoming transfers ===
College recruiting information
Name	Hometown	School	Height	Weight	Commit date
Luke House; SF	Norristown, PA	California University of Pennsylvania	6 ft 4 in (1.93 m)	210 lb (95 kg)	Mar 30, 2020
Luke House; SF	Recruit ratings: No ratings found				
Chuka Mekkam; PG	Portland, OR	Vincennes University	6 ft 0 in (1.83 m)	185 lb (84 kg)	May 25, 2020
Chuka Mekkam; PG	Recruit ratings: No ratings found				
Overall recruit ranking:
Note: In many cases, Scout, Rivals, 247Sports, On3, and ESPN may conflict in their listings of height and weight.; In these cases, the average was taken. ESPN grades are on a 100-point scale.; Sources: "Drexel 2020 Basketball Commitments". Rivals.; "Drexel Dragons". ESPN.; "2020 Team Ranking". Rivals.

=== 2020 recruiting class ===
College recruiting information
Name	Hometown	School	Height	Weight	Commit date
Lamar Oden Jr; SF	Atlanta, GA	Greenforest McCalep	6 ft 6 in (1.98 m)	180 lb (82 kg)	Sep 10, 2019
Lamar Oden Jr; SF	Recruit ratings: No ratings found				
Xavier Bell; SG	Andover, KS	Andover Central High School	6 ft 4 in (1.93 m)	175 lb (79 kg)	Jan 25, 2020
Xavier Bell; SG	Recruit ratings: No ratings found				
Amari Williams; C	Nottingham, United Kingdom	Myerscough College	6 ft 11 in (2.11 m)	223 lb (101 kg)	Feb 5, 2020
Amari Williams; C	Recruit ratings: No ratings found				
Overall recruit ranking:
Note: In many cases, Scout, Rivals, 247Sports, On3, and ESPN may conflict in their listings of height and weight.; In these cases, the average was taken. ESPN grades are on a 100-point scale.; Sources: "Drexel 2020 Basketball Commitments". Rivals.; "Drexel Dragons". ESPN.; "2020 Team Ranking". Rivals.

=== Class of 2021 early commitments ===
College recruiting information (2021)
Name	Hometown	School	Height	Weight	Commit date
Terrence Butler Jr; SF	Upper Marlboro, MD	Bishop McNamara High School	6 ft 6 in (1.98 m)	210 lb (95 kg)	Jul 20, 2020
Terrence Butler Jr; SF	Recruit ratings: No ratings found				
Trevion Brown; PG	Tacoma, WA	Colorado State–Pueblo	6 ft 2 in (1.88 m)	175 lb (79 kg)	Mar 30, 2021
Trevion Brown; PG	Recruit ratings: No ratings found				
Overall recruit ranking:
Note: In many cases, Scout, Rivals, 247Sports, On3, and ESPN may conflict in their listings of height and weight.; In these cases, the average was taken. ESPN grades are on a 100-point scale.; Sources: "Drexel 2021 Basketball Commitments". Rivals.; "Drexel Dragons". ESPN.; "2021 Team Ranking". Rivals.

== Preseason ==
In a poll of the league coaches, media relations directors, and media members at the CAA's media day, Drexel was picked to finish in third place in the CAA. Redshirt senior James Butler and Junior guard Camren Wynter were selected to the Preseason CAA All-Conference First Team.

== Roster ==
2020–21 Drexel Dragons men's basketball team
Players
Coaches

Pos.	#	Name	Height	Weight	Year	Previous school	Hometown
G	0	Coletrane Washington (injured) (redshirt)	6 ft 4 in (1.93 m)	170 lb (77 kg)	Jr	Quaker Valley HS	Sewickley, PA
F	1	Lamar Oden Jr	6 ft 6 in (1.98 m)	210 lb (95 kg)	Fr	Greenforest McCalep	Atlanta, GA
G	4	Xavier Bell	6 ft 3 in (1.91 m)	178 lb (81 kg)	Fr	Andover Central HS	Wichita, KS
F	5	Zach Walton	6 ft 6 in (1.98 m)	205 lb (93 kg)	RS Sr	Morton HS (WA)/Edmonds CC	Morton, WA
G	11	Camren Wynter (C)	6 ft 2 in (1.88 m)	175 lb (79 kg)	Jr	Holy Trinity HS/DME Academy	Hempstead, NY
G	12	Anto Keshgegian (W)	6 ft 3 in (1.91 m)	185 lb (84 kg)	RS Sr	St. Joseph's Prep/Temple	Media, PA
F	13	Tim Perry Jr	6 ft 10 in (2.08 m)	230 lb (104 kg)	RS Jr	Cherry Hill HS East/The Phelps School	Cherry Hill, NJ
F	14	Luke House (W)	6 ft 4 in (1.93 m)	210 lb (95 kg)	So	Archbishop John Carroll HS/Cal (PA)	Norristown, PA
G	15	Matej Juric	5 ft 11 in (1.8 m)	193 lb (88 kg)	Jr	Lake Forest Academy/Oakwood	Toronto, ON, Canada
G	20	Julian Adams (W)	6 ft 1 in (1.85 m)	175 lb (79 kg)	RS Sr	Dallastown Area HS	York, PA
F	21	Mate Okros	6 ft 6 in (1.98 m)	193 lb (88 kg)	So	Myerscough College	Debrecen, Hungary
C	22	Amari Williams	6 ft 10 in (2.08 m)	227 lb (103 kg)	Fr	Myerscough	Nottingham, United Kingdom
F	23	T.J. Bickerstaff	6 ft 9 in (2.06 m)	207 lb (94 kg)	So	Sandy Creek HS	Atlanta, GA
C	32	Tadas Kararinas	6 ft 10 in (2.08 m)	210 lb (95 kg)	Sr	Findlay Prep	Šilutė, Lithuania
F	51	James Butler (C)	6 ft 8 in (2.03 m)	242 lb (110 kg)	RS Sr	Lake Braddock/Navy	Fairfax Station, VA
C	55	Chuka Mekkam	6 ft 1 in (1.85 m)	185 lb (84 kg)	Jr	Bridgton Academy/Vincennes	Portland, OR

Head coach

- Zach Spiker (Ithaca)

Assistant coach(es)

- Paul Fortier (Washington)
- Justin Jennings (Penn State Behrend)
- Rob O'Driscoll (Villanova)
- Michael-Hakim Jordan (Penn)

Legend

- (C) Team captain
- (S) Suspended
- (I) Ineligible
- (W) Walk-on
- Injured
- Current redshirt

Roster
Last update: 1 December 2020

== Schedule and results ==
Date time, TV	Rank^{#}	Opponent^{#}	Result	Record	High points	High rebounds	High assists	Site (attendance) city, state
Non-conference regular season
November 25, 2020*; 1:00 pm, BTN+		at Penn State	Postponed due to COVID-19 pandemic					Bryce Jordan Center; University Park, PA
November 28, 2020*; 1:00 pm, ACCNX		at Pittsburgh	L 74–83	0–1	24 – Wynter	8 – Butler	5 – Juric	Petersen Events Center (500); Pittsburgh, PA
December 2, 2020*; 7:30 pm		vs. Quinnipiac; Hall of Fame Tip Off	W 66–48	1–1	17 – Wynter	12 – Butler	5 – Wynter	Mohegan Sun Arena (0); Uncasville, CT
December 3, 2020*; 2:00 pm		vs. Quinnipiac; Hall of Fame Tip Off	W 70–58	2–1	23 – Wynter	8 – Butler	7 – Wynter	Mohegan Sun Arena (0); Uncasville, CT
December 6, 2020*; 2:00 pm, NBCSPHI		Coppin State	W 69–54	3–1	15 – Wynter	9 – Butler	6 – Wynter	Daskalakis Athletic Center (0); Philadelphia, PA
December 12, 2020*; 2:00 pm, NBCSPHI		La Salle	L 48–58	3–2	15 – Wynter	9 – Butler	4 – Okros	Daskalakis Athletic Center (0); Philadelphia, PA
December 16, 2020*; 6:00 pm, NBCSPHI		Saint Joseph's	Postponed					Daskalakis Athletic Center; Philadelphia, PA
December 17, 2020*; 6:00 pm, NBCSPHI+		Saint Joseph's	W 81–77	4–2	21 – Butler	16 – Butler	7 – Wynter	Daskalakis Athletic Center (0); Philadelphia, PA
December 19, 2020*; 2:00 pm		at Fairleigh Dickinson	W 85–68	5–2	31 – Wynter	7 – Tied	4 – Juric	Rothman Center (0); Hackensack, NJ
December 22, 2020*; 2:00 pm, NBCSPHI+		Siena	Postponed due to COVID-19 pandemic					Daskalakis Athletic Center; Philadelphia, PA
CAA regular season
January 2, 2021; 1:00 pm		UNC Wilmington	Postponed due to COVID-19 pandemic					Daskalakis Athletic Center; Philadelphia, PA
January 3, 2021; 1:00 pm		UNC Wilmington	Postponed due to COVID-19 pandemic					Daskalakis Athletic Center; Philadelphia, PA
January 9, 2021; 1:00 pm		at Charleston	L 60–61	5–3 (0–1)	20 – Butler	14 – Butler	6 – Wynter	TD Arena (1,420); Charleston, SC
January 10, 2021; 1:00 pm		at Charleston	L 68–73	5–4 (0–2)	19 – Wynter	10 – Butler	5 – Wynter	TD Arena (1,410); Charleston, SC
January 16, 2021; 1:00 pm, NBCSPHI		William & Mary	W 82–58	6–4 (1–2)	20 – Walton	8 – Butler	11 – Wynter	Daskalakis Athletic Center (0); Philadelphia, PA
January 17, 2021; 1:00 pm		William & Mary	L 64–69	6–5 (1–3)	17 – Okros	10 – Butler	11 – Wynter	Daskalakis Athletic Center (0); Philadelphia, PA
January 23, 2021; 1:00 pm		at Elon	Postponed due to COVID-19 pandemic					Schar Center; Elon, NC
January 23, 2021; 1:00 pm		at William & Mary; Added due to Elon Postponement	W 79–64	7–5 (2–3)	21 – Butler	8 – Bickerstaff	4 – Wynter	Kaplan Arena (0); Williamsburg, VA
January 24, 2021; 1:00 pm		at Elon	Postponed due to COVID-19 pandemic					Schar Center; Elon, NC
January 30, 2021; 1:00 pm, NBCSPHI		Northeastern	Postponed due to COVID-19 pandemic					Daskalakis Athletic Center; Philadelphia, PA
January 31, 2021; 1:00 pm		Northeastern	Postponed due to COVID-19 pandemic					Daskalakis Athletic Center; Philadelphia, PA
January 31, 2021; 2:00 pm		at James Madison; Rescheduled from February 27	L 64–73	7–6 (2–4)	29 – Wynter	6 – 4 tied	3 – Wynter	Atlantic Union Bank Center (250); Harrisonburg, VA
February 6, 2021; 2:00 pm		at Hofstra	W 73–71	8–6 (3–4)	18 – Bickerstaff	5 – Tied	6 – Bickerstaff	Mack Sports Complex (0); Hempstead, NY
February 7, 2021; 2:00 pm		at Hofstra	L 74–79	8–7 (3–5)	18 – Bickerstaff	13 – Butler	6 – Wynter	Mack Sports Complex (0); Hempstead, NY
February 11, 2021; 6:30 pm, NBCSPHI+		Delaware	Postponed due to COVID-19 pandemic					Daskalakis Athletic Center; Philadelphia, PA
February 13, 2021; 2:00 pm		at Delaware	Postponed due to COVID-19 pandemic					Bob Carpenter Center; Newark, DE
February 20, 2021; 1:00 pm, NBCSPHI		Towson	Postponed due to COVID-19 pandemic					Daskalakis Athletic Center; Philadelphia, PA
February 21, 2021; 1:00 pm		Towson	Postponed due to COVID-19 pandemic					Daskalakis Athletic Center; Philadelphia, PA
February 26, 2021; 4:00 pm		at James Madison; Rescheduled from February 28	W 84–78	9–7 (4–5)	18 – Wynter	9 – Butler	7 – Wynter	Atlantic Union Bank Center (250); Harrisonburg, VA
CAA Tournament
March 7, 2021; 9:30 pm	(6)	vs. (3) Charleston; Quarterfinals	W 80–75	10–7	17 – Walton	8 – Tied	4 – Wynter	Atlantic Union Bank Center (0); Harrisonburg, VA
March 8, 2021; 9:30 pm, CBSSN	(6)	vs. (2) Northeastern; Semifinals	W 74–67	11–7	15 – Walton	12 – Butler	4 – Wynter	Atlantic Union Bank Center (0); Harrisonburg, VA
March 9, 2021; 7:00 pm, CBSSN	(6)	vs. (8) Elon; Championship	W 63–56	12–7	14 – Okros	9 – Tied	4 – Wynter	Atlantic Union Bank Center (250); Harrisonburg, VA
NCAA tournament
March 19, 2021; 1:15 pm, TBS	(16 MW)	vs. (1 MW) No. 2 Illinois; First Round	L 49–78	12–8	12 – Bell	10 – Butler	3 – Williams	Indiana Farmers Coliseum (968); Indianapolis, IN
*Non-conference game. ^{#}Rankings from AP. (#) Tournament seedings in parentheses. MW=Midwest. All times are in Eastern Time.

== Awards ==
James Butler

- CAA All-Tournament Team
- CAA All-Conference Third Team
- Preseason CAA All-Conference First Team
- "Sweep" Award (team leader in blocks)

Matej Juric

- Team Academic Award

Zach Walton

- CAA All-Tournament Team

Camren Wynter

- Lou Henson Award Finalist
- CAA Tournament Most Outstanding Player
- CAA All-Tournament Team
- CAA All-Conference First Team
- CAA Player of the Week (2)
- Preseason CAA All-Conference First Team
- Team Most Valuable Player

== See also ==
- 2020–21 Drexel Dragons women's basketball team
