= 2020–21 Towson Tigers men's basketball team =

American college basketball season

2020–21 Towson Tigers men's basketball
- Conference: Colonial Athletic Association
- Record: 4–14 (3–9 CAA)
- Head coach: Pat Skerry (10th season)
- Assistant coaches: Kevin Clark; Pat O'Connell; Branden McDonald
- Home arena: SECU Arena

2020–21 CAA men's basketball standings
	Conf.				Overall
Team	W		L	PCT	W		L	PCT
James Madison	8	–	2	.800	13	–	7	.650
Northeastern	8	–	2	.800	10	–	9	.526
Charleston	6	–	4	.600	9	–	10	.474
Hofstra	8	–	6	.571	13	–	10	.565
Delaware	5	–	4	.556	7	–	8	.467
Drexel †	4	–	5	.444	12	–	8	.600
William & Mary	4	–	6	.400	7	–	10	.412
Elon	4	–	7	.364	10	–	9	.526
Towson	3	–	9	.250	4	–	14	.222
UNC Wilmington	1	–	6	.143	7	–	10	.412
† 2021 CAA tournament winner

The 2020–21 Towson Tigers men's basketball team represented Towson University during the 2020–21 NCAA Division I men's basketball season. The Tigers, led by 10th-year head coach Pat Skerry, played their home games at the SECU Arena in Towson, Maryland as members of the Colonial Athletic Association. In a season limited due to the ongoing COVID-19 pandemic, they finished the season 4–14, 3–9 in CAA play to finish ninth place. They lost to Elon in the first round of the CAA tournament.

== Previous season ==
The Tigers finished the 2019–20 season 19–13, 12–6 in CAA play to finish in third place. They lost in the first round of the CAA tournament to Northeastern.

== Offseason ==
=== Departures ===
Name	Number	Pos.	Height	Weight	Year	Hometown	Reason for departure
Allen Betrand	2	G	6'5"	200	Sophomore	Philadelphia, Pennsylvania	Transferred to Rhode Island
Nigel Haughton	4	G	6'1"	170	Freshman	Bel Air, Maryland	Transferred to Chestnut Hill College
Dennis Tunstall	11	F	6'9"	225	RS Senior	Willingboro, New Jersey	Graduated
Nakye Sanders	20	F	6'8"	240	RS Senior	Staten Island, New York	Graduated
Brian Fobbs	23	G	6'5"	210	Senior	Rochester, New York	Graduated

=== Incoming transfers ===
Name	Number	Pos.	Height	Weight	Year	Hometown	Previous School
Curtis Holland III	0	G	6'2"	220	Junior	Churchton, Maryland	Transferred from High Point
Cam Allen	3	G	6'1"	185	Graduate	Greenville, South Carolina	Transferred from Cal State Bakersfield

=== 2020 recruiting class ===
College recruiting information
Name	Hometown	School	Height	Weight	Commit date
Darrick Jones Jr. G	Richmond, VA	Oak Hill Academy	6 ft 5 in (1.96 m)	190 lb (86 kg)	Sep 24, 2019
Darrick Jones Jr. G	Recruit ratings: Scout: Rivals: (77)				
Chris Biekeu; F	Montreal, QB	Vanier College	6 ft 7 in (2.01 m)	210 lb (95 kg)	Nov 15, 2019
Chris Biekeu; F	Recruit ratings: Scout: Rivals: (0)				
Overall recruit ranking:
Note: In many cases, Scout, Rivals, 247Sports, On3, and ESPN may conflict in their listings of height and weight.; In these cases, the average was taken. ESPN grades are on a 100-point scale.; Sources: "2020 Team Ranking". Rivals.

== Roster ==
2020–21 Towson Tigers men's basketball team
Players
Coaches

Pos.	#	Name	Height	Weight	Year	Previous school	Hometown
G	0	Curtis Holland III	6 ft 2 in (1.88 m)	220 lb (100 kg)	Jr	High Point University	Churchton, Maryland
G/F	1	Demetrius Mims	6 ft 6 in (1.98 m)	185 lb (84 kg)	RS So	Long Beach State	Baltimore, Maryland
G	2	Zane Martin	6 ft 4 in (1.93 m)	205 lb (93 kg)	RS Sr	Neumann-Goretti	Philadelphia, PA
G	3	Cam Allen	6 ft 1 in (1.85 m)	185 lb (84 kg)	GS	Cal State Bakersfield	Greenville, South Carolina
G	5	Jakigh Dottin	6 ft 2 in (1.88 m)	211 lb (96 kg)	Jr	Woodstock Academy	Cambridge, MA
G	11	Jason Gibson	6 ft 1 in (1.85 m)	165 lb (75 kg)	So	Sidwell Friends	Severna Park, MD
F	12	Juwan Gray	6 ft 8 in (2.03 m)	215 lb (98 kg)	RS Sr	San Diego	Dover, DE
G	15	Chris Caliguiran (W)	5 ft 6 in (1.68 m)	140 lb (64 kg)	Jr	Bishop Ireton	Accokeek, MD
F	22	Solomon Uyaelunmo	6 ft 7 in (2.01 m)	230 lb (104 kg)	RS So	Calvary Christian HS	Fort Lauderdale, FL
G	23	Darrick Jones Jr.	6 ft 5 in (1.96 m)	190 lb (86 kg)	Fr	Oak Hill Academy	Richmond, Virginia
G	24	Greg Cross (W)	6 ft 4 in (1.93 m)	213 lb (97 kg)	Sr	Springbrook	Silver Spring, MD
G	25	Nicolas Timberlake	6 ft 4 in (1.93 m)	200 lb (91 kg)	RS So	Kimball Union	Braintree, MA
F	32	Charles Thompson	6 ft 7 in (2.01 m)	235 lb (107 kg)	So	St. Stephen's & St. Agnes	Fort Washington, MD
C	34	Victor Uyaelunmo	7 ft 0 in (2.13 m)	220 lb (100 kg)	RS Jr	USC	Miami, FL
F	35	Chris Biekeu	6 ft 7 in (2.01 m)	210 lb (95 kg)	Fr	Vanier College	Montreal, Quebec
G	44	Justin Patterson (W)	6 ft 4 in (1.93 m)	215 lb (98 kg)	Fr	Landon School	Bowie, MD

Head coach

- Pat Skerry (Tufts)

Assistant coach(es)

- Kevin Clark (Clark)
- Pat O'Connell (Johns Hopkins)
- Branden McDonald (Virginia Union)

Legend

- (C) Team captain
- (S) Suspended
- (I) Ineligible
- (W) Walk-on
- Injured
- Current redshirt

Roster

== Schedule and results ==
Date time, TV	Rank^{#}	Opponent^{#}	Result	Record	Site (attendance) city, state
Non-conference regular season
November 25, 2020*; 1:30 pm, FloHoops		No. 4 Virginia; Bubbleville	L 54–89	0–1	Mohegan Sun Arena; Uncasville, CT
November 26, 2020*; 3:30 pm, FloHoops		San Francisco; Bubbleville	L 68–79	0–2	Mohegan Sun Arena; Uncasville, CT
November 27, 2020*; 4:30 pm, FloHoops		Buffalo; Bubbleville	L 65–74	0–3	Mohegan Sun Arena; Uncasville, CT
December 1, 2020*; 7:00 pm, BTN		at Maryland	Canceled due to COVID-19		Xfinity Center; College Park, MD
December 5, 2020*; 1:00 pm, ESPN3		at UMBC	Postponed due to COVID-19		UMBC Event Center; Catonsville, MD
December 7, 2020*; 7:00 pm, FloHoops		George Washington	Postponed due to COVID-19		SECU Arena; Towson, MD
December 16, 2020*; 5:00 pm, FloHoops		La Salle	Postponed due to COVID-19		SECU Arena; Towson, MD
December 23, 2020*; 4:00 pm, ESPN+		at George Mason	L 65–70	0–4	EagleBank Arena; Fairfax, VA
December 26, 2020*; 2:00 pm, FloHoops		Coppin State	W 78–73	1–4	SECU Arena; Towson, MD
December 29, 2020*; 3:00 pm, ESPN+		at Iona	Postponed due to COVID-19		Hynes Athletic Center; New Rochelle, NY
December 30, 2020*; 6:00 pm, FloHoops		Morgan State	Postponed due to COVID-19		SECU Arena; Towson, MD
CAA regular season
January 3, 2021; 1:00 pm, FloHoops		James Madison	Postponed due to COVID-19		SECU Arena; Towson, MD
January 5, 2021; 2:00 pm, FloHoops		at James Madison	Postponed due to COVID-19		Atlantic Union Bank Center; Harrisonburg, VA
January 9, 2021; 1:00 pm, FloHoops		at Elon	Postponed due to COVID-19		Schar Center; Elon, NC
January 10, 2021; 12:00 pm, FloHoops		at Elon	Postponed due to COVID-19		Schar Center; Elon, NC
January 16, 2021; 2:00 pm, FloHoops		James Madison	L 72–81	1–5 (0-1)	SECU Arena; Towson, MD
January 18, 2021; 2:00 pm, FloHoops		UNC Wilmington	W 72–69	2–5 (1–1)	SECU Arena; Towson, MD
January 19, 2021; 1:00 pm, FloHoops		UNC Wilmington	W 78–74	3–5 (2–1)	SECU Arena; Towson, MD
January 23, 2021; 2:00 pm, FloHoops		at Hofstra	L 58–71	3–6 (2–2)	Mack Sports Complex; Hempstead, NY
January 24, 2021; 2:00 pm, FloHoops		at Hofstra	L 69–74	3–7 (2–3)	Mack Sports Complex; Hempstead, NY
January 27, 2021; 4:00 pm, MASN		at James Madison	L 63–78	3–8 (2–4)	Atlantic Union Bank Center; Harrisonburg, VA
January 30, 2021; 1:00 pm, FloHoops		William & Mary	L 74–84	3–9 (2–5)	SECU Arena; Towson, MD
January 31, 2021; 1:00 pm, FloHoops		William & Mary	L 74–75	3–10 (2–6)	SECU Arena; Towson, MD
February 6, 2021; 1:00 pm, FloHoops		at Charleston	L 88–90 ^{2OT}	3–11 (2–7)	TD Arena (1,493); Charleston, SC
February 7, 2021; 1:00 pm, FloHoops		at Charleston	L 53–66	3–12 (2–8)	TD Arena (1,445); Charleston, SC
February 13, 2021; 1:00 pm, FloHoops		Northeastern	L 67–76	3–13 (2–9)	SECU Arena; Towson, MD
February 14, 2021; 1:00 pm, FloHoops		Northeastern	W 68–57	4–13 (3–9)	SECU Arena; Towson, MD
CAA tournament
March 6, 2021; 3:00 pm, FloHoops	(9)	vs. (8) Elon; First round	L 48–69	4–14	Atlantic Union Bank Center (250); Harrisonburg, VA
*Non-conference game. ^{#}Rankings from AP. (#) Tournament seedings in parentheses. All times are in Eastern Time.
