= 2020–21 Northeastern Huskies men's basketball team =

American college basketball season

2020–21 Northeastern Huskies men's basketball

CAA regular season co-champions
- Conference: Colonial Athletic Association
- Record: 10–9 (8–2 CAA)
- Head coach: Bill Coen (15th season)
- Assistant coaches: Chris Markwood; Brian McDonald; Manny Adako
- Home arena: Matthews Arena

2020–21 CAA men's basketball standings
	Conf.				Overall
Team	W		L	PCT	W		L	PCT
James Madison	8	–	2	.800	13	–	7	.650
Northeastern	8	–	2	.800	10	–	9	.526
Charleston	6	–	4	.600	9	–	10	.474
Hofstra	8	–	6	.571	13	–	10	.565
Delaware	5	–	4	.556	7	–	8	.467
Drexel †	4	–	5	.444	12	–	8	.600
William & Mary	4	–	6	.400	7	–	10	.412
Elon	4	–	7	.364	10	–	9	.526
Towson	3	–	9	.250	4	–	14	.222
UNC Wilmington	1	–	6	.143	7	–	10	.412
† 2021 CAA tournament winner

The 2020–21 Northeastern Huskies men's basketball team represented Northeastern University during the 2020–21 NCAA Division I men's basketball season. The Huskies, led by 15th-year head coach Bill Coen, played their home games at Matthews Arena in Boston, Massachusetts as members of the Colonial Athletic Association (CAA).

== Previous season ==
The Huskies finished the 2019–20 season 17–16, 9–9 in CAA play, to finish in sixth place. They lost in the finals of the CAA tournament to Hofstra.

== Roster ==
2020–21 Northeastern Huskies men's basketball team
Players
Coaches

Pos.	#	Name	Height	Weight	Year	Previous school	Hometown
F	00	Jason Strong	6 ft 8 in (2.03 m)	206 lb (93 kg)	RS Jr	Westminster Academy	Coconut Creek, FL
G	1	Vito Cubrilo	6 ft 4 in (1.93 m)	195 lb (88 kg)	So	Sports Gymnasium Zagreb	Zagreb, Croatia
G	2	Tyson Walker	6 ft 0 in (1.83 m)	166 lb (75 kg)	So	Christ the King HS	Westbury, NY
G	3	J'Vonne Hadley	6 ft 6 in (1.98 m)	201 lb (91 kg)	Fr	Cretin-Derham Hall HS	St. Paul, MN
F	10	Greg Eboigbodin	6 ft 9 in (2.06 m)	241 lb (109 kg)	RS Jr	University of Detroit Jesuit HS	Benin City, Nigeria
G	11	Jahmyl Telfort	6 ft 7 in (2.01 m)	228 lb (103 kg)	Fr	New Hampton HS	Boucherville, QC
F	12	Alexander Nwagha	6 ft 8 in (2.03 m)	223 lb (101 kg)	Fr	Orangeville Prep	Milton, ON
F	15	Coleman Stucke	6 ft 7 in (2.01 m)	215 lb (98 kg)	Fr	Orangeville Prep	Oakville, ON
G	22	Quirin Emanga	6 ft 5 in (1.96 m)	219 lb (99 kg)	So	Otto-Hahn-Gymnasium	Marbach am Neckar, Germany
G	24	Shaquille Walters	6 ft 6 in (1.98 m)	195 lb (88 kg)	RS Jr	Lee Academy	London, England
F	32	Connor Braun	6 ft 9 in (2.06 m)	200 lb (91 kg)	RS Fr	Valley Christian HS	Tempe, AZ
F	33	Richie Greaves	6 ft 7 in (2.01 m)	237 lb (108 kg)	RS So	Marlborough HS	Marlborough, MA

Head coach

- Bill Coen (Hamilton College)

Assistant coach(es)

- Chris Markwood (Maine)
- Brian McDonald (Northeastern)
- Manny Adako (Northeastern)

Legend

- (C) Team captain
- (S) Suspended
- (I) Ineligible
- (W) Walk-on
- Injured
- Current redshirt

Roster
Last update: December 4, 2020

== Schedule and results ==
Date time, TV	Rank^{#}	Opponent^{#}	Result	Record	Site (attendance) city, state
Regular season
December 9, 2020*; 7:00 p.m., NESN		UMass Lowell	Postponed due to positive COVID-19 tests		Matthews Arena; Boston, MA
December 11, 2020*; 1:30 p.m., NESN		at Massachusetts	L 79–94	0–1	Mullins Center (0); Amherst, MA
December 13, 2020*; 12:00 p.m., NESN		Massachusetts	W 78–75	1–1	Matthews Arena (0); Boston, MA
December 16, 2020*; 3:00 p.m., ACCN		at Syracuse	L 56–62	1–2	Carrier Dome (0); Syracuse, NY
December 20, 2020*; 2:00 p.m.		at Old Dominion	L 62–66	1–3	Chartway Arena (0); Norfolk, VA
December 22, 2020*; 7:00 p.m., SECN+		at Georgia	L 58–76	1–4	Stegeman Coliseum (1,638); Athens, GA
December 29, 2020*; 2:00 p.m., ESPN+		at No. 9 West Virginia	L 51–73	1–5	WVU Coliseum; Morgantown, WV
January 2, 2021; 12:00 p.m., NESN+		Elon	W 74–52	2–5 (1–0)	Matthews Arena; Boston, MA
January 3, 2021; 12:00 p.m., NESN		Elon	W 66–58	3–5 (2–0)	Matthews Arena; Boston, MA
January 7, 2021; 7:00 p.m., FloSports		at Hofstra	W 81–78 ^{OT}	4–5 (3–0)	Mack Sports Complex; Hempstead, NY
January 9, 2021; 12:00 p.m., FloSports		Hofstra	W 67–56	5–5 (4–0)	Matthews Arena; Boston, MA
January 16, 2021; 1:00 p.m., FloSports		at College of Charleston	W 67–62	6–5 (5–0)	TD Arena (1,530); Charleston, SC
January 17, 2021; 1:00 p.m., FloSports		at College of Charleston	W 68–66	7–5 (6–0)	TD Arena (1,451); Charleston, SC
January 23, 2021; 12:00 p.m., FloSports		James Madison	W 72–63	8–5 (7–0)	Matthews Arena; Boston, MA
January 24, 2021; 12:00 p.m., FloSports		James Madison	L 72–79	8–6 (7–1)	Matthews Arena; Boston, MA
January 30, 2021; 1:00 pm, FloSports		at Drexel	Postponed due to COVID-19		Daskalakis Athletic Center; Philadelphia, PA
January 31, 2021; 1:00 pm, FloSports		at Drexel	Postponed due to COVID-19		Daskalakis Athletic Center; Philadelphia, PA
February 6, 2021; 12:00 p.m., FloSports		Delaware	Postponed due to COVID-19		Matthews Arena; Boston, MA
February 7, 2021; 12:00 p.m., FloSports		Delaware	Postponed due to COVID-19		Matthews Arena; Boston, MA
February 13, 2021; 1:00 p.m., FloSports		at Towson	W 76–67	9–6 (8–1)	SECU Arena; Towson, MD
February 14, 2021; 1:00 p.m., FloSports		at Towson	L 57–68	9–7 (8–2)	SECU Arena; Towson, MD
February 17, 2021*; 7:00 pm, ACCNX		at North Carolina	L 62–82	9–8	Dean E. Smith Center; Chapel Hill, NC
CAA tournament
March 7, 2021; 6:00 pm, FloSports	(2)	vs. (7) William & Mary; Quarterfinals	W 63–47	10–8	Atlantic Union Bank Center (250); Harrisonburg, VA
March 8, 2021; 9:30 pm, CBSSN	(2)	vs. (6) Drexel; Semifinals	L 67–74	10–9	Atlantic Union Bank Center (250); Harrisonburg, VA
*Non-conference game. ^{#}Rankings from AP poll. (#) Tournament seedings in parentheses. All times are in Eastern.
