= 2020–21 Delaware Fightin' Blue Hens men's basketball team =

American college basketball season

2020–21 Delaware Fightin' Blue Hens men's basketball
- Conference: Colonial Athletic Association
- Record: 7–8 (5–4 CAA)
- Head coach: Martin Ingelsby (5th season)
- Assistant coaches: Bill Phillips; Corey McCrae; Torrian Jones
- Home arena: Bob Carpenter Center

2020–21 CAA men's basketball standings
	Conf.				Overall
Team	W		L	PCT	W		L	PCT
James Madison	8	–	2	.800	13	–	7	.650
Northeastern	8	–	2	.800	10	–	9	.526
Charleston	6	–	4	.600	9	–	10	.474
Hofstra	8	–	6	.571	13	–	10	.565
Delaware	5	–	4	.556	7	–	8	.467
Drexel †	4	–	5	.444	12	–	8	.600
William & Mary	4	–	6	.400	7	–	10	.412
Elon	4	–	7	.364	10	–	9	.526
Towson	3	–	9	.250	4	–	14	.222
UNC Wilmington	1	–	6	.143	7	–	10	.412
† 2021 CAA tournament winner

The 2020–21 Delaware Fightin' Blue Hens men's basketball team represented the University of Delaware in the 2020–21 NCAA Division I men's basketball season. The Fightin' Blue Hens, led by fifth-year head coach Martin Ingelsby, play their home games at the Bob Carpenter Center in Newark, Delaware as members of the Colonial Athletic Association.

== Previous season ==
The Fightin' Blue Hens finished the 2019–20 season 22–11, 11–7 in CAA play to finish in a tie for fourth place. They defeated the College of Charleston in the quarterfinals of the CAA tournament, before falling to top seeded Hofstra in the semifinals.

== Offseason ==
=== Departures ===
Name	Number	Pos.	Height	Weight	Year	Hometown	Reason for departure
Nate Darling	3	G	6'5"	200	RS Junior	Halifax, Nova Scotia	Declared for the NBA draft
Jacob Cushing	22	F	6'8"	215	Senior	Naperville, Illinois	Graduated
Eric Carter	5	F	6'9"	235	RS Senior	Jackson, New Jersey	Graduated
Justyn Mutts	25	F	6'7"	220	RS Sophomore	Millville, New Jersey	Transferred to Virginia Tech
Collin Goss	33	F	6'11"	230	RS Senior	Manassas, Virginia	Graduated

=== Incoming transfers ===
Name	Number	Pos.	Height	Weight	Year	Hometown	Previous School
Logan Curtis	55	G	6'3"	185	RS Sophomore	Baltimore, Maryland	Transferred from East Carolina. Under NCAA transfer rules, Curtis has to sit out the entirety of the 2020–21 season. He will have three years of remaining eligibility.

=== Recruiting class of 2020 ===
College recruiting
Name	Hometown	School	Height	Weight	Commit date
Gianmarco Arletti; SG	Bologna, Italy	Holy Cross Preparatory Academy	6 ft 6 in (1.98 m)	188 lb (85 kg)	Oct 5, 2019
Gianmarco Arletti; SG	Recruit ratings: No ratings found				
Andrew Carr; PF	West Chester, PA	West Chester East High School	6 ft 9 in (2.06 m)	185 lb (84 kg)	Aug 2, 2019
Andrew Carr; PF	Recruit ratings: No ratings found				
Overall recruit ranking:
Note: In many cases, Scout, Rivals, 247Sports, On3, and ESPN may conflict in their listings of height and weight.; In these cases, the average was taken. ESPN grades are on a 100-point scale.; Sources: "2020 Team Ranking". Rivals.

== Roster ==
2020–21 Delaware Fightin' Blue Hens men's basketball team
Players
Coaches

Pos.	#	Name	Height	Weight	Year	Previous school	Hometown
G	0	Ryan Allen	6 ft 2 in (1.88 m)	200 lb (91 kg)	Sr	DeMatha Catholic High School	Bowie, Maryland
G	1	Kevin Anderson	6 ft 5 in (1.96 m)	205 lb (93 kg)	Sr	St. John Neumann High School	Williamsport, Pennsylvania
F	2	Dylan Painter	6 ft 10 in (2.08 m)	235 lb (107 kg)	RS Sr	Villanova	Hershey, Pennsylvania
G	4	Gianmarco Arletti	6 ft 6 in (1.98 m)	205 lb (93 kg)	Fr	Holy Cross Prep	Bologna, Italy
G	5	Reggie Gardner	6 ft 3 in (1.91 m)	175 lb (79 kg)	RS Jr	North Carolina Central	Bowie, Maryland
G	10	Johnny McCoy	6 ft 5 in (1.96 m)	190 lb (86 kg)	So	Tilton School	Mansfield, Massachusetts
G	11	Fred Rullo IV	5 ft 11 in (1.8 m)	165 lb (75 kg)	So	Devon Prep	Newtown Square, Pennsylvania
G	14	Ebby Asamoah	6 ft 4 in (1.93 m)	200 lb (91 kg)	So	Magruder High School	Rockville, Maryland
F	15	Aleks Novakovich	6 ft 9 in (2.06 m)	230 lb (104 kg)	RS So	Don Bosco Institute	Hobart, Indiana
F	21	Andrew Carr	6 ft 9 in (2.06 m)	210 lb (95 kg)	Fr	West Chester East High School	West Chester, Pennsylvania
G	23	Davis Long	6 ft 2 in (1.88 m)	185 lb (84 kg)	Jr	Sherwood High School	Brookeville, Maryland
F	32	Anthony Ochefu	6 ft 8 in (2.03 m)	240 lb (109 kg)	Sr	Stony Brook	West Chester, Pennsylvania
F	40	O.D. Ogunbo	6 ft 8 in (2.03 m)	205 lb (93 kg)	Fr	Delcastle High School	Lagos, Nigeria
G	55	Logan Curtis	6 ft 3 in (1.91 m)	185 lb (84 kg)	So	East Carolina	Baltimore, Maryland

Head coach

- Martin Ingelsby (Notre Dame)

Assistant coach(es)

- Bill Phillips (St. Joseph's)
- Corey McCrae (Fordham)
- Torrian Jones (Notre Dame)

Legend

- (C) Team captain
- (S) Suspended
- (I) Ineligible
- (W) Walk-on
- Injured
- Current redshirt

Roster
Last update: January 23, 2021

== Schedule and results ==
Date time, TV	Rank^{#}	Opponent^{#}	Result	Record	Site (attendance) city, state
Non-conference regular season
December 5, 2020*; 2:00 pm, FloHoops		Salem	W 79–76	1–0	Bob Carpenter Center; Newark, DE
December 8, 2020*; 4:00 pm		at UMBC	L 61–76	1–1	UMBC Event Center; Catonsville, MD
December 11, 2020*; 7:00 pm, FloHoops		George Washington	W 68–65	2–1	Bob Carpenter Center; Newark, DE
December 19, 2020*; 4:30 pm, NBCSN		at La Salle	L 61–71	2–2	Tom Gola Arena; Philadelphia, PA
December 21, 2020*; 7:00 pm, FloHoops		Morgan State	L 59–65	2–3	Bob Carpenter Center; Newark, DE
CAA regular season
January 2, 2021; 2:00 pm, FloHoops		College of Charleston	W 70–67	3–3 (1–0)	Bob Carpenter Center; Newark, DE
January 3, 2021; 2:00 pm, FloHoops		College of Charleston	L 59–66	3–4 (1–1)	Bob Carpenter Center; Newark, DE
January 9, 2021; 2:00 pm, FloHoops		at William & Mary	L 62–67	3–5 (1–2)	Kaplan Arena; Williamsburg, VA
January 10, 2021; 2:00 pm, FloHoops		at William & Mary	Cancelled due to COVID-19		Kaplan Arena; Williamsburg, VA
January 15, 2021; 1:00 pm, FloHoops		Hofstra	W 74–56	4–5 (2–2)	Bob Carpenter Center; Newark, DE
January 17, 2021; 1:00 pm, FloHoops		Hofstra	L 67–68	4–6 (2–3)	Bob Carpenter Center; Newark, DE
January 23, 2021; 1:00 pm, FloSports		at UNC Wilmington	L 70–77	4–7 (2–4)	Trask Coliseum; Wilmington, NC
January 24, 2021; 1:00 pm, FloHoops		at UNC Wilmington	W 67–62	5–7 (3–4)	Trask Coliseum; Wilmington, NC
January 30, 2021; 2:00 pm, FloHoops		Elon	W 66–43	6–7 (4–4)	Bob Carpenter Center; Newark, DE
January 31, 2021; 2:00 pm, FloHoops		Elon	W 75–70	7–7 (5–4)	Bob Carpenter Center; Newark, DE
February 6, 2021; 12:00 pm, FloHoops		at Northeastern	Cancelled due to COVID-19		Cabot Center; Boston, MA
February 7, 2021; 12:00 pm, FloHoops		at Northeastern	Cancelled due to COVID-19		Cabot Center; Boston, MA
February 11, 2021; 7:00 pm, FloHoops		at Drexel	Cancelled due to COVID-19		Daskalakis Athletic Center; Philadelphia, PA
February 13, 2021; 2:00 pm, FloHoops		Drexel	Cancelled due to COVID-19		Bob Carpenter Center; Newark, DE
February 20, 2021; 6:00 pm, FloHoops		James Madison	Cancelled due to COVID-19		Bob Carpenter Center; Newark, DE
February 21, 2021; 5:00 pm, FloHoops		James Madison	Cancelled due to COVID-19		Bob Carpenter Center; Newark, DE
February 27, 2021; 1:00 pm, FloHoops		at Towson	Cancelled due to COVID-19		SECU Arena; Towson, MD
February 28, 2021; 1:00 pm, FloHoops		at Towson	Cancelled due to COVID-19		SECU Arena; Towson, MD
CAA tournament
March 7, 2021; 11:00 am, FloHoops	(5)	vs. (4) Hofstra; Quarterfinals	L 75–83	7–8	Atlantic Union Bank Center; Harrisonburg, VA
*Non-conference game. ^{#}Rankings from AP Poll. (#) Tournament seedings in parentheses. All times are in Eastern.
