= 2020–21 Hofstra Pride men's basketball team =

American college basketball season

2020–21 Hofstra Pride men's basketball
- Conference: Colonial Athletic Association
- Record: 13–10 (8–6 CAA)
- Head coach: Mike Farrelly (acting, 1st season)
- Assistant coaches: Speedy Claxton; Colin Curtin
- Home arena: Mack Sports Complex

2020–21 CAA men's basketball standings
	Conf.				Overall
Team	W		L	PCT	W		L	PCT
James Madison	8	–	2	.800	13	–	7	.650
Northeastern	8	–	2	.800	10	–	9	.526
Charleston	6	–	4	.600	9	–	10	.474
Hofstra	8	–	6	.571	13	–	10	.565
Delaware	5	–	4	.556	7	–	8	.467
Drexel †	4	–	5	.444	12	–	8	.600
William & Mary	4	–	6	.400	7	–	10	.412
Elon	4	–	7	.364	10	–	9	.526
Towson	3	–	9	.250	4	–	14	.222
UNC Wilmington	1	–	6	.143	7	–	10	.412
† 2021 CAA tournament winner

The 2020–21 Hofstra Pride men's basketball team represented Hofstra University during the 2020–21 NCAA Division I men's basketball season. The Pride were coached by Mike Farrelly, who served as acting head coach while Joe Mihalich was out on a temporary medical leave of absence. They played their home games at Mack Sports Complex in Hempstead, New York as members of the Colonial Athletic Association. In a season limited due to the ongoing COVID-19 pandemic, the Pride finished the season 13–10, 8–6 in CAA play to finish in fourth place. They defeated Delaware in the quarterfinals of the CAA tournament before losing to Elon in the semifinals.

== Previous season ==
The Pride finished the 2019–20 season 26–8, 14–4 in CAA play to win the regular season CAA championship. They defeated Drexel and Delaware to advance to the championship game of the CAA tournament. There they defeated Northeastern to win the tournament championship and receive the conference's automatic bid to the NCAA tournament. However, the tournament was canceled due to the COVID-19 pandemic.

== Offseason ==
=== Departures ===
Name	Number	Pos.	Height	Weight	Year	Hometown	Reason for departure
Jermaine Miranda	3	G	6'4"	190	Freshman	Juncos, Puerto Rico	Transferred to California Baptist
Desure Buie	4	G	5'11"	160	RS Senior	Bronx, NY	Graduated
Eli Pemberton	5	G	6'5"	195	Senior	Middletown, CT	Graduated
Hal Hughes	11	F/C	6'9"	220	RS Freshman	Sydney, Australia	Entered transfer portal
Connor Klementowicz	24	G	6'2"	210	Senior	Freehold, New Jersey	Graduated

=== Incoming transfers ===
Name	Number	Pos.	Height	Weight	Year	Hometown	Previous School
Cole Eiber	31	G	6'1"	185	Graduate Student	Albertson, NY	Graduate transfer from Western New England; will have immediate eligibility.

=== 2020 recruiting class ===
College recruiting information
Name	Hometown	School	Height	Weight	Commit date
Zion Bethea; SG	South Orange, NJ	Immaculate Conception High School	6 ft 3 in (1.91 m)	205 lb (93 kg)	Sep 10, 2019
Zion Bethea; SG	Recruit ratings: Scout: Rivals: (NR)				
David Green; SF	Apopka, FL	Ocoee High School	6 ft 7 in (2.01 m)	215 lb (98 kg)	Jun 28, 2019
David Green; SF	Recruit ratings: Scout: Rivals: (NR)				
Vukasin Masic; SG	Belgrade, Serbia	Hoosac School	6 ft 5 in (1.96 m)	195 lb (88 kg)	Feb 25, 2020
Vukasin Masic; SG	Recruit ratings: Scout: Rivals: (NR)				
Overall recruit ranking:
Note: In many cases, Scout, Rivals, 247Sports, On3, and ESPN may conflict in their listings of height and weight.; In these cases, the average was taken. ESPN grades are on a 100-point scale.; Sources: "2020 Team Ranking". Rivals.

== Roster ==
2020–21 Hofstra Pride men's basketball team
Players
Coaches

Pos.	#	Name	Height	Weight	Year	Previous school	Hometown
G	0	Tareq Coburn	6 ft 5 in (1.96 m)	205 lb (93 kg)	RS Sr	St. Bonaventure	Queens, New York
G	1	Caleb Burgess	6 ft 3 in (1.91 m)	170 lb (77 kg)	So	Moravian Prep	Winston-Salem, North Carolina
G	2	Omar Silverio	6 ft 3 in (1.91 m)	200 lb (91 kg)	Jr	Rhode Island	Santiago de los Caballeros, Dominican Republic
G/F	4	David Green	6 ft 7 in (2.01 m)	215 lb (98 kg)	Fr	Ocoee	Apopka, Florida
G	5	Zion Bethea	6 ft 3 in (1.91 m)	205 lb (93 kg)	Fr	Immaculate Conception	South Orange, New Jersey
G	12	Carl Gibson Jr. (W)	6 ft 2 in (1.88 m)	170 lb (77 kg)	So	Cherry Hill East	Cherry Hill, New Jersey
F/C	14	Kevin Schutte	6 ft 9 in (2.06 m)	235 lb (107 kg)	RS Jr	CSE Zwolle	Zwolle, Overijssel, The Netherlands
F	15	Stafford Trueheart	6 ft 8 in (2.03 m)	215 lb (98 kg)	RS Sr	Canisius	Buffalo, New York
G	20	Jalen Ray	6 ft 2 in (1.88 m)	175 lb (79 kg)	Sr	Hampton	Hampton, Virginia
F	23	Kvonn Cramer	6 ft 6 in (1.98 m)	205 lb (93 kg)	RS Fr	Mount Pleasant	Wilmington, Delaware
G	25	Vukasin Masic	6 ft 5 in (1.96 m)	195 lb (88 kg)	Fr	Hoosac	Belgrade, Serbia
G	31	Cole Eiber	6 ft 1 in (1.85 m)	185 lb (84 kg)	GS	Western New England	Albertson, New York
F/C	32	Isaac Kante	6 ft 7 in (2.01 m)	240 lb (109 kg)	RS Jr	Georgia	Brooklyn, New York

Head coach

- Mike Farrelly (Saint Joseph's)

Assistant coach(es)

- Speedy Claxton (Hofstra)
- Colin Curtin (Niagara)

Legend

- (C) Team captain
- (S) Suspended
- (I) Ineligible
- (W) Walk-on
- Injured
- Current redshirt

Roster
Last update: March 24, 2021

== Schedule and results ==
Date time, TV	Rank^{#}	Opponent^{#}	Result	Record	Site (attendance) city, state
Non-conference regular season
November 29, 2020*; 4:00 pm, BTN		at No. 24 Rutgers	L 56–70	0–1	Rutgers Athletic Center; Piscataway, NJ
November 30, 2020*; 7:00 pm, FloSports		Fairleigh Dickinson	W 73–58	1–1	Mack Sports Complex; Hempstead, NY
December 5, 2020*; 4:00 pm, FloSports		Iona	L 74–82	1–2	Mack Sports Complex; Hempstead, NY
December 9, 2020*; 7:00 pm, FloSports		Stony Brook	W 72–67	2–2	Mack Sports Complex; Hempstead, NY
December 15, 2020*; 7:00 pm, ESPN3		at Monmouth	W 96–88	3–2	OceanFirst Bank Center; West Long Branch, NJ
December 19, 2020*; 2:00 pm, ESPN+		at St. Bonaventure	L 69–77	3–3	Reilly Center; St. Bonaventure, NY
December 22, 2020*; 2:00 pm, ESPN+		at Richmond	W 76–71	4–3	Robins Center; Richmond, VA
CAA regular season
January 2, 2021; 2:00 pm, FloSports		William & Mary	W 61–56	5–3 (1–0)	Mack Sports Complex; Hempstead, NY
January 3, 2021; 2:00 pm, FloSports		William & Mary	W 82–73	6–3 (2–0)	Mack Sports Complex; Hempstead, NY
January 7, 2021; 5:00 pm, FloSports		Northeastern	L 78–81 ^{OT}	6–4 (2–1)	Mack Sports Complex; Hempstead, NY
January 9, 2021; 12:00 pm, FloSports		at Northeastern	L 56–67	6–5 (2–2)	Cabot Center; Boston, MA
January 15, 2021; 1:00 pm, FloSports		at Delaware	L 56–74	6–6 (2–3)	Bob Carpenter Center; Newark, DE
January 17, 2021; 1:00 pm, FloSports		at Delaware	W 68–67	7–6 (3–3)	Bob Carpenter Center; Newark, DE
January 23, 2021; 2:00 pm, FloSports		Towson	W 71–58	8–6 (4–3)	Mack Sports Complex; Hempstead, NY
January 24, 2021; 2:00 pm, FloSports		Towson	W 74–69	9–6 (5–3)	Mack Sports Complex; Hempstead, NY
January 30, 2021; 1:00 pm, FloSports		at UNC Wilmington	W 82–73	10–6 (6–3)	Trask Coliseum (25); Wilmington, NC
January 31, 2021; 1:00 pm, FloSports		at UNC Wilmington	W 89–83	11–6 (7–3)	Trask Coliseum (25); Wilmington, NC
February 6, 2021; 2:00 pm, FloSports		Drexel	L 71–73	11–7 (7–4)	Mack Sports Complex; Hempstead, NY
February 7, 2021; 2:00 pm, FloSports		Drexel	W 79–74	12–7 (8–4)	Mack Sports Complex; Hempstead, NY
February 13, 2021; 2:00 pm, FloSports		at James Madison	L 89–93	12–8 (8–5)	Atlantic Union Bank Center (250); Harrisonburg, VA
February 14, 2021; 2:00 pm, FloSports		at James Madison	L 70–74	12–9 (8–6)	Atlantic Union Bank Center (250); Harrisonburg, VA
CAA tournament
March 7, 2021; 11:00 am, FloHoops	(4)	vs. (5) Delaware; Quarterfinals	W 83–75	13–9	Atlantic Union Bank Center (250); Harrisonburg, VA
March 8, 2021; 6:00 pm, CBSSN	(4)	vs. (8) Elon; Semifinals	L 58–76	13–10	Atlantic Union Bank Center (250); Harrisonburg, VA
*Non-conference game. ^{#}Rankings from AP Poll. (#) Tournament seedings in parentheses. All times are in Eastern Time.
