= 2020–21 UNC Wilmington Seahawks men's basketball team =

American college basketball season

2020–21 UNC Wilmington Seahawks men's basketball
- Conference: Colonial Athletic Association
- Record: 7–10 (1–6 CAA)
- Head coach: Takayo Siddle (1st season)
- Assistant coaches: Travis Hackert; Kurt Kanaskie; Monty Sanders
- Home arena: Trask Coliseum

2020–21 CAA men's basketball standings
	Conf.				Overall
Team	W		L	PCT	W		L	PCT
James Madison	8	–	2	.800	13	–	7	.650
Northeastern	8	–	2	.800	10	–	9	.526
Charleston	6	–	4	.600	9	–	10	.474
Hofstra	8	–	6	.571	13	–	10	.565
Delaware	5	–	4	.556	7	–	8	.467
Drexel †	4	–	5	.444	12	–	8	.600
William & Mary	4	–	6	.400	7	–	10	.412
Elon	4	–	7	.364	10	–	9	.526
Towson	3	–	9	.250	4	–	14	.222
UNC Wilmington	1	–	6	.143	7	–	10	.412
† 2021 CAA tournament winner

The 2020–21 UNC Wilmington Seahawks men's basketball team represented the University of North Carolina Wilmington during the 2020–21 NCAA Division I men's basketball season. The Seahawks was led by Takayo Siddle, who took over from C.B. McGrath when he was fired by UNCW in January 2020. They played their home games at Trask Coliseum as part of the Colonial Athletic Association.

== Previous season ==
The Seahawks finished the 2019–20 season with a 10–22 record and 5–13 in conference play. They were eliminated in the first round of the 2020 CAA men's basketball tournament when they lost to the Drexel Dragons.

== Offseason ==
=== Departures ===
Name	Number	Pos.	Height	Weight	Year	Hometown	Reason for departure
Kai Toews	10	G	6'2"	180	Sophomore	Tokyo	Pursuing basketball career in his hometown.

== Roster ==
2020–21 UNC Wilmington Seahawks men's basketball team
Players
Coaches

Pos.	#	Name	Height	Weight	Year	Previous school	Hometown
G	0	Ty Gadsden	6 ft 1 in (1.85 m)	165 lb (75 kg)	Sr	Arlington Country Day School; Vincennes	Charlotte, NC
G	1	Brian Tolefree	6 ft 5 in (1.96 m)	195 lb (88 kg)	Jr	Eudora HS/Neosho County CC	Lawrence, KS
G	2	Shykeim Phillips	6 ft 0 in (1.83 m)	170 lb (77 kg)	Fr	South Central HS	Winterville, NC
G	4	Mike Okauru	6 ft 3 in (1.91 m)	185 lb (84 kg)	Sr	Ravenscroft School; Florida	Raleigh, NC
G	5	Jake Boggs	6 ft 5 in (1.96 m)	190 lb (86 kg)	So	Carmel Christian	Charlotte, NC
G	10	Jamahri Harvey	6 ft 5 in (1.96 m)	175 lb (79 kg)	Fr	Moravian Prep	Fayetteville, NC
G	12	Jay Estime	6 ft 5 in (1.96 m)	185 lb (84 kg)	So	Berkmar HS	Lilburn, GA
G	13	Ian Steere	6 ft 9 in (2.06 m)	245 lb (111 kg)	Fr	Northwood Temple Academy	Sanford, NC
G	14	Joe Pridgen	6 ft 5 in (1.96 m)	210 lb (95 kg)		Governor's Academy	Winchendon, MA
G	22	Brent Jenkins	6 ft 5 in (1.96 m)	190 lb (86 kg)	Jr	Virginia Episcopal School	Elizabeth City, NC
G	23	Ja'juan Carr	6 ft 2 in (1.88 m)	180 lb (82 kg)	Fr	Pender High School	Rocky Point, NC
F	24	Imajae Dodd	6 ft 6 in (1.98 m)	255 lb (116 kg)	So	Greene Central HS	Snow Hill, NC
G	30	Jaylen Sims	6 ft 6 in (1.98 m)	195 lb (88 kg)	Jr	United Faith Christian Academy	Charlotte, NC
F	32	John Bowen	6 ft 7 in (2.01 m)	200 lb (91 kg)	Jr	West Bladen HS/Belmont Abbey	Bladenboro, NC

Head coach

- Takayo Siddle (Gardner–Webb)

Assistant coach(es)

- Travis Hackert (Louisville)
- Kurt Kanaskie (La Salle)
- Monty Sanders (Chowan)

Legend

- (C) Team captain
- (S) Suspended
- (I) Ineligible
- (W) Walk-on
- Injured
- Current redshirt

Roster
Last update: August 18, 2020

== Schedule and results ==
Date time, TV	Rank^{#}	Opponent^{#}	Result	Record	Site (attendance) city, state
Non-conference regular season
Nov 25, 2020*; 4:00 pm, ESPN+		vs. Western Carolina; Mako Medical Asheville Classic	L 76–98	0–1	Kimmel Arena; Asheville, NC
Nov 27, 2020*; 3:30 pm, ESPN+		at UNC Asheville; Mako Medical Asheville Classic	W 76–68	1–1	Kimmel Arena; Asheville, NC
Nov 28, 2020*; 1:00 pm, ESPN+		vs. Troy; Mako Medical Asheville Classic	W 73–50	2–1	Kimmel Arena; Asheville, NC
Dec 7, 2020*; 5:00 pm, ESPN+		at East Carolina	L 78–88	2–2	Williams Arena (65); Greenville, NC
Dec 9, 2020*; 7:00 pm, FloSports		St. Andrews	W 116–66	3–2	Trask Coliseum; Wilmington, NC
Dec 12, 2020*; 5:00 pm, SECN Alt.		at Ole Miss	L 58–78	3–3	The Pavilion at Ole Miss (895); Oxford, MS
Dec 18, 2020*; 4:00 pm, FloSports		at Norfolk State	W 80–72	4–3	Joseph G. Echols Memorial Hall (110); Norfolk, VA
Dec 21, 2020*; 1:00 pm, ESPN+		at Campbell	W 78–59	5–3	Gore Arena; Buies Creek, NC
Dec 23, 2020*; 12:00 pm, FloSports		Delaware State	W 87–63	6–3	Trask Coliseum; Wilmington, NC
CAA regular season
Jan 2, 2021; 1:00 pm, FloSports		at Drexel	Postponed due to COVID-19 issues		Daskalakis Athletic Center; Philadelphia, PA
Jan 3, 2021; 1:00 pm, FloSports		at Drexel	Postponed due to COVID-19 issues		Daskalakis Athletic Center; Philadelphia, PA
Jan 9, 2021; 1:00 pm, FloSports		James Madison	Postponed due to COVID-19 issues		Trask Coliseum; Wilmington, NC
Jan 18, 2021; 2:00 pm, FloSports		at Towson	L 69–72	6–4 (0–1)	SECU Arena; Towson, MD
Jan 19, 2021; 1:00 pm, FloSports		at Towson	L 74–78	6–5 (0–2)	SECU Arena; Towson, MD
Jan 23, 2021; 1:00 pm, FloSports		Delaware	W 77–70	7–5 (1–2)	Trask Coliseum (25); Wilmington, NC
Jan 24, 2021; 1:00 pm, FloSports		Delaware	L 62–67	7–6 (1–3)	Trask Coliseum (25); Wilmington, NC
Jan 30, 2021; 1:00 pm, FloSports		Hofstra	L 73–82	7–7 (1–4)	Trask Coliseum (25); Wilmington, NC
Jan 31, 2021; 1:00 pm, FloSports		Hofstra	L 83–89	7–8 (1–5)	Trask Coliseum (25); Wilmington, NC
Feb 6, 2020; 1:00 pm, FloSports		at Elon	Postponed due to COVID-19 issues		Schar Center; Elon, NC
Feb 7, 2020; 1:00 pm, FloSports		at Elon	Postponed due to COVID-19 issues		Schar Center; Elon, NC
Feb 13, 2020; 1:00 pm, FloSports		William & Mary	Postponed due to COVID-19 issues		Trask Coliseum; Wilmington, NC
Feb 14, 2020; 1:00 pm, FloSports		William & Mary	Postponed due to COVID-19 issues		Trask Coliseum; Wilmington, NC
Feb 20, 2021; 12:00 pm, FloSports		at Northeastern	Postponed due to COVID-19 issues		Cabot Center; Boston, MA
Feb 21, 2021; 12:00 pm, FloSports		at Northeastern	Postponed due to COVID-19 issues		Cabot Center; Boston, MA
Feb 25, 2021; 7:00 pm, FloSports		College of Charleston	Postponed due to COVID-19 issues		Trask Coliseum; Wilmington, NC
Feb 27, 2021; 6:00 pm, FloSports		Elon	L 77–80	7–9 (1–6)	Trask Coliseum (800); Wilmington, NC
CAA tournament
March 6, 2021; 7:00 pm, FloHoops	(10)	vs. (7) William & Mary; First round	L 60–73	7–10	Atlantic Union Bank Center (250); Harrisonburg, VA
*Non-conference game. ^{#}Rankings from AP poll. (#) Tournament seedings in parentheses. All times are in Eastern Time.
