= Mike Jordan (basketball, born 1977) =

American basketball player-coach

Personal information
- Born: June 24, 1977 (age 49) Philadelphia, Pennsylvania, U.S.
- Listed height: 6 ft 0 in (1.83 m)

Career information
- High school: Abington Friends (Jenkintown, Pennsylvania)
- College: Penn (1996–2000)
- NBA draft: 2000: undrafted
- Playing career: 2000–2011
- Position: Point guard
- Coaching career: 2012–present

Career history

Playing
- 2000: Besançon BCD
- 2001: Trenton Shooting Stars
- 2001–2002: Murcia
- 2002: Margarita
- 2002–2005: Artland Dragons
- 2005: Ventspils
- 2005–2006: Köln 99ers
- 2006–2007: Pallacanestro Cantù
- 2007–2008: Spirou Charleroi
- 2008: P.A.O.K.
- 2008: Ironi Ashkelon
- 2008–2009: Brose Baskets
- 2009: Köln 99ers
- 2009–2010: Phoenix Hagen
- 2010–2011: Mitteldeutscher
- 2011: Gießen 46ers

Coaching
- 2012–2020: Colgate (assistant)
- 2020–2021: Drexel (assistant)
- 2021–2022: Colgate (assistant)
- 2022–2023: Lafayette

Career highlights
- Italian A1 League All-Star (2007); 2× Bundesliga champion; Ivy League Player of the Year (2000); 3× First Team All-Ivy League (1998–2000); Ivy League Rookie of the Year (1997)

Michael-Hakim Jordan (born June 24, 1977), is an American basketball coach and former professional player who was formerly the men's basketball head coach of the Lafayette Leopards men's basketball team.

== Playing career ==
After starring at the Abington Friends School, Jordan moved on to a college basketball career at the University of Pennsylvania, where he was the 1999–2000 Ivy League Player of the Year as a senior. While playing for the Quakers, Jordan was part of two Ivy League regular-season titles and appeared in the NCAA Tournament in 1999 and 2000.

The 6-foot-0-inch (1.83 m) point guard then went on to try out in semi-professional leagues such as the USBL, the IBL and the NRL. Prior the National Basketball Association's 2000–01 regular season, he tried out with the Philadelphia 76ers and the Boston Celtics but was unsuccessful in securing a contract with either. He has since played in countries such as Spain, Venezuela, Latvia, France, and more recently for the Artland Dragons Quakenbrück and RheinEnergie Köln in Germany. In 2006–07 season, he played in the Italian Serie A league for Pallacanestro Cantù. In 2007–08, he played for Spirou Charleroi and PAOK BC. During the latter part of the 2008–09 season, Jordan rejoined the Koln 99ers of the Basketball Bundesliga. During the 2009–10 season, he joined Phoenix Hagen also of the Basketball Bundesliga.

== Coaching career ==
Jordan got his start as an assistant coach in 2012 under his former college teammate Matt Langel at Colgate. With the Raiders, he was part of the team's 2018–19 and 2019–20 Patriot League regular-season titles, including the 2019 Patriot League tournament title and a bid in the 2019 NCAA tournament. Jordan would take an assistant coaching position at Drexel for one season in 2020–21, where he was on the Dragons' coaching staff that guided the team to the 2021 CAA tournament title and a berth in the 2021 NCAA tournament. He'd return to Colgate the following season, where once again he was on staff for regular season and tournament title wins and another Colgate appearance in the NCAA Tournament.

On March 29, 2022, Jordan was appointed to succeed Fran O'Hanlon as head coach at Lafayette. On February 21, 2023, Lafayette announced that Jordan was being placed on paid administrative leave while it investigates a complaint filed against him. Mike McGarvey was appointed as acting head coach. On March 29, 2023, Jordan was fired, leaving McGarvey's position as the head coach as permanent.

== Personal life ==
For most of his life he was known as Michael Jordan, but since he is not related to the more prominent American basketball player of the same name, and got tired of the constant comparisons, he included his second name to his title, thus he became also referred to as Michael-Hakim Jordan.

== Head coaching record ==
Record table
| Season | Team | Overall | Conference | Standing | Postseason |
|---|---|---|---|---|---|
Lafayette Leopards (Patriot League) (2022–present)
| 2022–23 | Lafayette | 9–20 | 7–9 | 6th | |
| Lafayette: | | 9–20 (.310) | 7–9 (.438) | | |
| Total: | | 9–20 (.310) | | | |
National champion Postseason invitational champion Conference regular season champion Conference regular season and conference tournament champion Division regular season champion Division regular season and conference tournament champion Conference tournament champion
