= Northeastern Huskies men's basketball =

Men's basketball team of Northeastern University

2026–27 Northeastern Huskies men's basketball team
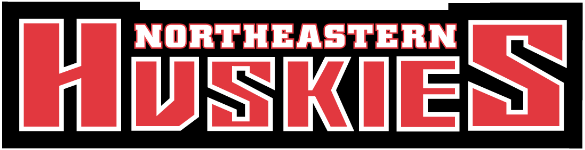
- University: Northeastern University
- Head coach: Bill Coen (20th season)
- Location: Boston, Massachusetts
- Arena: Cabot Center (capacity: 1,500)
- Conference: Coastal Athletic Association
- Nickname: Huskies
- Colors: Red and black
- Student section: The Doghouse
- All-time record: 1,308–1,223 (.517)

NCAA Division I tournament Elite Eight
- 1962*, 1963*
Other NCAA Division I tournament results
Sweet Sixteen	1962*, 1963*, 1964*
Appearances	1962*, 1963*, 1964*, 1966*, 1968*, 1981, 1982, 1984, 1985, 1986, 1987, 1991, 2015, 2019

Conference tournament champions
- America East: 1981, 1982, 1984, 1985, 1986, 1987, 1991; Colonial: 2015, 2019

Conference regular-season champions
- 1981, 1982, 1984, 1985, 1986, 1987, 1990, 1991, 2013, 2015, 2018, 2021

Uniforms
Home	Away	Alternate
- * at Division II level

The Northeastern Huskies men's basketball team represents Northeastern University, located in Boston, Massachusetts, in NCAA Division I basketball competition. The team has competed in the Coastal Athletic Association (CAA) since 2005 and has won two tournament titles, having previously played in the America East Conference, where they won seven tournament titles. The Huskies have appeared in nine NCAA tournaments, most recently in 2019.

The Huskies currently play home games at the 1,500-seat Cabot Center, following the late-2025 closure and subsequent demolition of the team's former home of Matthews Arena. Since 2006, the Huskies have been coached by Bill Coen.

== Current team ==
=== Roster ===
As of January 22, 2025.

2024-25 Men's Basketball Roster
Name	Position	Year	No.	Height	Weight	Hometown	Last School	Previous Team(s)
Nate Francois	G	Sr.	0	6-1	200	Boston, MA	Brighton High School	
Masai Troutman	G	Jr.	1	6'4	202	Frederick, MD	St. Andrew's Episcopal School	
Alexander Nwagha	F	Gr.	2	6'7	233	Milton, ON	Orangeville Prep	
LA Pratt	G	Jr.	3	6'5	192	Columbus, OH	Lincoln Park High School	Elon University
Rashad King	G	Jr.	4	6'6	204	Evans, GA	Evans High School	
Youri Fritz	F	Jr.	7	6'8	215	Tiel, Netherlands	Leidsche Rijn College	Canisius University
William Kermoury	G	Soph.	8	6'5	194	Stockholm, Sweden	Sodertalje BBK	
Harold Woods	G	Jr.	10	6'5	215	Hammond, IN	Hammond High School	
J.B. Frankel	G	Soph.	11	6'3	192	New York, NY	Brewster Academy	
Ryan Williams	G	Frosh.	20	6'4	180	Phoenixville, PA	Malvern Prep	
Luca Soroa	G	Frosh.	22	6'6	195	Valencia, Spain	Team Speights	
Sam Thomson	F	Grad.	30	6'8	232	Kitchener, ON	Brooks School	Colgate University
Collin Metcalf	C	Jr.	45	6'9	233	Nortorf, Germany	Humphreys High School	

=== Coaching staff ===
Name	Title	College
Bill Coen	Head coach	Hamilton College
Brian McDonald	Assistant coach	Northeastern University
Matt Janning	Assistant coach	Northeastern University
Joel Smith	Assistant coach	Northeastern University
Tom Murphy	Coord. of Basketball Advancement	Springfield College
Patrick Isberg	Director of Operations	Northeastern University

== Season-by-season ==
Year	Overall record			America East record				Postseason	Head coach
Year	W	L	Win %	W	L	Win %	Finish	Postseason	Head coach
2001–02	7	21	.250	5	11	.313	7th		Ron Everhart
2002–03	16	15	.516	8	8	.500	5th		Ron Everhart
2003–04	19	11	.633	13	5	.722	3rd		Ron Everhart
2004–05	21	10	.677	15	3	.833	2nd	NIT first round	Ron Everhart
Year	Overall record			CAA record				Postseason	Head coach
Year	W	L	Win %	W	L	Win %	Finish	Postseason	Head coach
2005–06	19	11	.633	12	6	.667	5th		Ron Everhart
2006–07	13	19	.406	9	9	.500	T-5th		Bill Coen
2007–08	14	17	.452	9	9	.500	T-6th		Bill Coen
2008–09	19	13	.594	12	6	.667	T-3rd	CBI Quarterfinals	Bill Coen
2009–10	20	13	.606	14	4	.778	2nd	NIT first round	Bill Coen
2010–11	11	20	.355	6	12	.333	T-9th		Bill Coen
2011–12	14	17	.452	9	9	.500	7th		Bill Coen
2012–13	20	13	.606	14	4	.778	1st	NIT first round	Bill Coen
2013–14	11	21	.344	7	19	.438	5th		Bill Coen
2014–15	23	12	.657	12	6	.667	1st	NCAA first round	Bill Coen
2015–16	18	15	.545	9	9	.500	6th		Bill Coen
2016–17	15	16	.484	8	10	.444	6th		Bill Coen
2017–18	23	10	.697	14	4	.778	T-1st		Bill Coen
2018–19	23	10	.697	14	4	.778	2nd	NCAA first round	Bill Coen
2019–20	17	16	.515	9	9	.500	6th	Cancelled due to the Coronavirus Pandemic	Bill Coen
2020–21	10	9	.526	8	2	.800	T-1st		Bill Coen
2021–22	9	22	.290	2	16	.111	10th		Bill Coen
2022–23	10	20	.333	6	12	.333	T-9th		Bill Coen
2023–24	12	20	.400	7	11	.389	10th		Bill Coen
2024–25	17	15	.531	9	9	.500	T-7th		Bill Coen

== Postseason ==
=== NCAA Division I tournament results ===
The Huskies have appeared in the NCAA Division I tournament nine times. Their combined record is 3–9.

Year	Seed	Round	Opponent	Result
1981	#11	First round Second Round	Fresno State; Utah	W 55–53; L 69–94
1982	#11	First round Second Round	Saint Joseph's; Villanova	W 63–62; L 72–76^{3OT}
1984	#11	Preliminary Round; First round	Long Island; VCU	W 90–87; L 69–70
1985	#14	First round	Illinois	L 57–76
1986	#13	First round	Oklahoma	L 74–80
1987	#14	First round	Purdue	L 95–104
1991	#16	First round	North Carolina	L 66–101
2015	#14	First round	Notre Dame	L 65–69
2019	#13	First round	Kansas	L 53–87

=== NCAA Division II tournament results ===
The Huskies have appeared in the NCAA Division II tournament five times. Their combined record is 7–5.

Year	Round	Opponent	Result
1962	Regional semifinals Regional Finals; Elite Eight	Saint Anselm; Fairfield; Southern Illinois	W 88–78; W 80–69; L 57–73
1963	Regional semifinals Regional Finals; Elite Eight	Assumption; Springfield; Wittenberg	W 74–60; W 47–45; L 47–48
1964	Regional semifinals Regional Finals	Assumption; Adelphi	W 79–68; L 66–68
1966	Regional Quarterfinals; Regional semifinals	Springfield; Assumption	W 93–80; L 69–96
1968	Regional Quarterfinals; Regional consolation Game	Rochester; Le Moyne	L 70–73; W 67–54

=== NIT results ===
The Huskies have appeared in the National Invitation Tournament (NIT) three times. Their combined record is 0–3.

Year	Round	Opponent	Result
2005	First round	Memphis	L 65–90
2010	First round	Connecticut	L 57–59
2013	First round	Alabama	L 43–62

=== CBI results ===
The Huskies have appeared in the College Basketball Invitational (CBI) one time. Their record is 1–1.

Year	Round	Opponent	Result
2009	First round Quarterfinals	Wyoming; UTEP	W 64–62; L 66–75

== Huskies in the NBA ==
Five former Huskies players have gone on to play in the NBA.

- J. J. Barea (Undrafted, 2006 NBA draft, Dallas Mavericks)
- Harry Barnes (37th pick, 1968 NBA draft, San Diego Rockets
- Reggie Lewis (22nd pick, 1987 NBA draft, Boston Celtics)
- Perry Moss (69th pick, 1982 NBA draft, Boston Celtics
- Rick Weitzman (110th pick, 1967 NBA draft, Boston Celtics)
