= Bill Coen =

American basketball player-coach

Current position
- Title: Head coach
- Team: Northeastern
- Conference: CAA
- Record: 308–326 (.486)

Biographical details
- Born: May 3, 1961 (age 65)

Playing career
- 1979–1983: Hamilton

Coaching career (HC unless noted)
- 1987–1989: Hamilton (assistant)
- 1989–1997: Rhode Island (assistant)
- 1997–2006: Boston College (assistant)
- 2006–present: Northeastern

Head coaching record
- Overall: 308–326 (.486)
- Tournaments: 0–2 (NCAA Division I); 0–2 (NIT); 1–1 (CBI)

Accomplishments and honors

Championships
- 4 CAA regular season (2013, 2015, 2018, 2021); 2 CAA tournament (2015, 2019)

Awards
- CAA Coach of the Year (2018)

Bill Coen (born May 3, 1961) is an American college basketball coach and the current head men's basketball coach at the Northeastern University. He was previously an assistant coach under Al Skinner at Boston College and Rhode Island. Under his coaching, the Huskies have won two CAA tournament championships and played in the NCAA Division I men's basketball tournament two times.

== Head coaching record ==
Record table
Season	Team	Overall	Conference	Standing	Postseason
Northeastern Huskies (Colonial Athletic Association) (2006–2023)
2006–07	Northeastern	13–19	9–9	T–5th	
2007–08	Northeastern	14–17	9–9	T–6th	
2008–09	Northeastern	19–13	12–6	T–3rd	CBI Quarterfinal
2009–10	Northeastern	20–13	14–4	2nd	NIT First Round
2010–11	Northeastern	11–20	6–12	T–9th	
2011–12	Northeastern	14–17	9–9	7th	
2012–13	Northeastern	20–13	14–4	1st	NIT First Round
2013–14	Northeastern	11–21	7–9	5th	
2014–15	Northeastern	23–12	12–6	T–1st	NCAA Division I Round of 64
2015–16	Northeastern	18–15	9–9	6th	
2016–17	Northeastern	15–16	8–10	6th	
2017–18	Northeastern	23–10	14–4	T–1st	
2018–19	Northeastern	23–11	14–4	2nd	NCAA Division I Round of 64
2019–20	Northeastern	17–16	9–9	6th	
2020–21	Northeastern	10–9	8–2	T–1st	
2021–22	Northeastern	9–22	2–16	10th	
2022–23	Northeastern	10–20	6–12	T–9th	
Northeastern Huskies (Coastal Athletic Association) (2023–present)
2023–24	Northeastern	12–20	7–11	9th	
2024–25	Northeastern	17–15	9–9	T–7th	
2025–26	Northeastern	7–24	2–16	13th	
2026–27	Northeastern	2–3	0–0		
Northeastern:		308–326 (.486)	180–170 (.514)		
Total:		308–326 (.486)			
National champion Postseason invitational champion Conference regular season champion Conference regular season and conference tournament champion Division regular season champion Division regular season and conference tournament champion Conference tournament champion
