= Zach Spiker =

American basketball coach (born 1976)

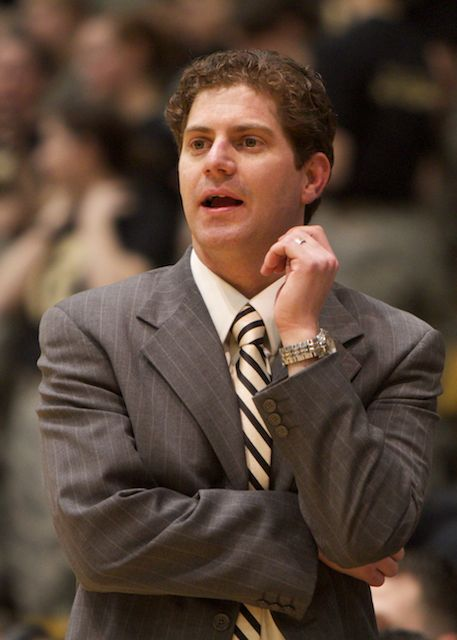
- Spiker coaching at Army in 2011

Current position
- Title: Head coach
- Team: Drexel
- Conference: CAA
- Record: 149–163 (.478)

Biographical details
- Born: September 30, 1976 (age 50); Morgantown, West Virginia, U.S.
- Education: Ithaca College (2000)

Playing career
- 1996–2000: Ithaca

Coaching career (HC unless noted)
- 2000–2002: Winthrop (GA)
- 2004–2009: Cornell (asst.)
- 2009–2016: Army
- 2016–present: Drexel

Administrative career (AD unless noted)
- 2002–2004: West Virginia (admin. asst.)

Head coaching record
- Overall: 251–275 (.477)
- Tournaments: 0–1 (NCAA Division I); 0–1 (CIT)

Accomplishments and honors

Championships
- CAA tournament (2021)

Awards
- Patriot League Coach of the Year (2013); Skip Prosser Man of the Year Award (2016)

Zachary John Spiker (born September 30, 1976) is an American college basketball coach who is the current head basketball coach for the Drexel Dragons.

== Early life ==
A native of Morgantown, West Virginia, Spiker attended The Hill School before playing college basketball at Ithaca College.

== Coaching career ==
=== Cornell (2004-2009) ===
Spiker served for five years as assistant coach for Cornell Big Red under head coach Steve Donahue. In 2009, he was hired by the Army Black Knights to replace the recently-fired Jim Crews.

=== Army (2009—2016) ===
In the 2012–13 season, Spiker lead Army to its first overall winning record since 1984–85 (a drought of 28 years), and also the Black Knights' first ever winning record in the Patriot League. For his efforts, Spiker was named 2012-13 Patriot League Coach of the Year, the first Army head coach in eleven years to win the award.

Spiker has joined Bob Knight and Mike Krzyzewski as the only coaches in Army history to win at least 65 games in their first five seasons.

In 2013–14, the Black Knights set a school record for wins in the Patriot League (10), had only their second season with a winning conference record, and had their first ever back-to-back seasons with winning conference records - all under Spiker.

Finally, under Spiker, Army had its first four-year streak of 15 plus wins (2012–16) since 1920–24.

=== Drexel (2016–present) ===
On March 25, 2016, Spiker was hired as head coach of Drexel to replace former head coach Bruiser Flint. His first year at Drexel concluded with a 9-23 record.

On February 22, 2018, Spiker led Drexel to a 34-point comeback win over Delaware, the largest comeback win in Division 1 history.

== Head coaching record ==
Record table
| Season | Team | Overall | Conference | Standing | Postseason |
|---|---|---|---|---|---|
Army Black Knights (Patriot League) (2009–2016)
| 2009–10 | Army | 14–15 | 4–10 | 8th | |
| 2010–11 | Army | 11–19 | 3–11 | 8th | |
| 2011–12 | Army | 12–18 | 5–9 | 6th | |
| 2012–13 | Army | 16–15 | 8–6 | 4th | |
| 2013–14 | Army | 15–16 | 10–8 | 5th | |
| 2014–15 | Army | 15–15 | 6–12 | 10th | |
| 2015–16 | Army | 19–14 | 9–9 | T–4th | CIT first round |
| Army: | | 102–112 (.477) | 45–65 (.409) | | |
Drexel Dragons (Colonial Athletic Association) (2016–2023)
| 2016–17 | Drexel | 9–23 | 3–15 | 10th | |
| 2017–18 | Drexel | 13–20 | 6–12 | T–7th | |
| 2018–19 | Drexel | 13–19 | 7–11 | T–6th | |
| 2019–20 | Drexel | 14–19 | 6–12 | 8th | |
| 2020–21 | Drexel | 12–8 | 4–5 | 6th | NCAA Division I Round of 64 |
| 2021–22 | Drexel | 15–14 | 10–8 | T–4th | |
| 2022–23 | Drexel | 17–15 | 10–8 | 5th | |
Drexel Dragons (Coastal Athletic Association) (2023–present)
| 2023–24 | Drexel | 20–12 | 13–5 | 2nd | |
| 2024–25 | Drexel | 18–15 | 9–9 | T–7th | |
| 2025–26 | Drexel | 17–16 | 10–8 | T–5th | |
| 2026–27 | Drexel | 3–2 | 0–0 | | |
| Drexel: | | 149–163 (.478) | 76–93 (.450) | | |
| Total: | | 251–275 (.477) | | | |
National champion Postseason invitational champion Conference regular season champion Conference regular season and conference tournament champion Division regular season champion Division regular season and conference tournament champion Conference tournament champion

== Personal life ==
He is married to Jennifer DePrez, a former college soccer player for the University of Rochester. They have 3 children.
