= 2021 CAA men's basketball tournament =

- Classification: Division I
- Season: 2020–21
- Teams: 10
- Site: Atlantic Union Bank Center; Harrisonburg, VA
- Champions: Drexel (1st title)
- Winning coach: Zach Spiker (1st title)
- MVP: Camren Wynter (Drexel)
- Top scorer: Hunter McIntosh (Elon) (66 points)
- Television: FloHoops, CBSSN

2020–21 CAA men's basketball standings
	Conf.				Overall
Team	W		L	PCT	W		L	PCT
James Madison	8	–	2	.800	13	–	7	.650
Northeastern	8	–	2	.800	10	–	9	.526
Charleston	6	–	4	.600	9	–	10	.474
Hofstra	8	–	6	.571	13	–	10	.565
Delaware	5	–	4	.556	7	–	8	.467
Drexel †	4	–	5	.444	12	–	8	.600
William & Mary	4	–	6	.400	7	–	10	.412
Elon	4	–	7	.364	10	–	9	.526
Towson	3	–	9	.250	4	–	14	.222
UNC Wilmington	1	–	6	.143	7	–	10	.412
† 2021 CAA tournament winner

The 2021 Colonial Athletic Association men's basketball tournament was the postseason men's basketball tournament for the Colonial Athletic Association for the 2020–21 NCAA Division I men's basketball season. The tournament was held March 6–9, 2021 at the Atlantic Union Bank Center in Harrisonburg, Virginia. The tournament was originally scheduled to be played at the Entertainment and Sports Arena in Washington, D.C., however it was relocated due to the COVID-19 pandemic. This was the first time since 1986 that the CAA has crowned its men's basketball champion at an on-campus facility.

== Seeds ==
All 10 CAA teams participated in the tournament.

Seed	School	Conf.	Tiebreaker
1	James Madison	8–2	2–0 vs. Towson
2	Northeastern	8–2	1–1 vs. Towson
3	Charleston	6–4	
4	Hofstra	8–6	
5	Delaware	5–4	
6	Drexel	4–5	
7	William & Mary	4–6	
8	Elon	4–7	
9	Towson	3–9	
10	UNC Wilmington	1–6	

== Schedule ==
Session	Game	Time*	Matchup	Score	Television
First round – Saturday, March 6
1	1	3:00 pm	No. 8 Elon vs. No. 9 Towson	69–48	FloHoops
1	2	6:30 pm	No. 7 William & Mary vs. No. 10 UNC Wilmington	73–60	FloHoops
Quarterfinals – Sunday, March 7
2	3	11:00 am	No. 4 Hofstra vs. No. 5 Delaware	83–75	FloHoops
2	4	2:30 pm	No. 1 James Madison vs. No. 8 Elon	71–72	FloHoops
3	5	6:00 pm	No. 2 Northeastern vs. No. 7 William & Mary	63–47	FloHoops
3	6	9:30 pm	No. 3 Charleston vs. No. 6 Drexel	75–80	FloHoops
Semifinals – Monday, March 8
4	7	6:00 pm	No. 4 Hofstra vs. No. 8 Elon	58–76	CBSSN
4	8	9:30 pm	No. 2 Northeastern vs. No. 6 Drexel	67–74	CBSSN
Championship – Tuesday, March 9
5	9	7:00 pm	No. 8 Elon vs. No. 6 Drexel	56–63	CBSSN
*Game times in ET. Rankings denote tournament seed

== Bracket ==
First round Saturday, March 6 FloHoops
8	Elon	69
9	Towson	48
7	William & Mary	73
10	UNC Wilmington	60

Quarterfinals; Sunday, March 7 FloHoops
1	James Madison	71
8	Elon	72
4	Hofstra	83
5	Delaware	75
2	Northeastern	63
7	William & Mary	47
3	Charleston	75
6	Drexel	80

Semifinals; Monday, March 8 CBS Sports Network
8	Elon	76
4	Hofstra	58
2	Northeastern	67
6	Drexel	74

Championship; Tuesday, March 9 CBS Sports Network
8	Elon	56
6	Drexel	63

* denotes overtime game

== See also ==
- 2021 CAA women's basketball tournament
