= Matt Lewis (basketball) =

American basketball player (born 1998)

No. 11 – Rasta Vechta
- Position: Small forward / shooting guard
- League: Basketball Bundesliga

Personal information
- Born: December 21, 1998 (age 27) Woodbridge, Virginia, U.S.
- Listed height: 6 ft 5 in (1.96 m)
- Listed weight: 200 lb (91 kg)

Career information
- High school: Bishop O'Connell (Arlington, Virginia)
- College: James Madison (2017–2021)
- NBA draft: 2021: undrafted
- Playing career: 2021–present

Career history
- 2021–2023: Iowa Wolves
- 2023–2024: Le Mans
- 2024–2025: Karditsa
- 2025–2026: Panionios
- 2026–present: Rasta Vechta

Career highlights
- CAA Player of the Year (2021); First-team All-CAA (2021); Second-team All-CAA (2020); Third-team All-CAA (2019); CAA All-Rookie Team (2018)
- Stats at NBA.com
- Stats at Basketball Reference

Matt Lewis (born December 21, 1998) is an American professional basketball player for Rasta Vechta of the Basketball Bundesliga. He played college basketball player for the James Madison Dukes.

== College career ==
Lewis starred at Bishop O'Connell High School in Arlington, Virginia and chose James Madison University (JMU) for college. He entered the starting lineup for the Dukes, averaging 14.5 points and 3.5 rebounds per game in his freshman season, earning Colonial Athletic Association (CAA) All-Rookie Team honors. Lewis followed this up with a sophomore year where he averaged 16.4 points, 4.2 rebounds and 3.2 assists, garnering third-team All-CAA honors. In his junior year, Lewis again improved his scoring average to 19 points per game and earned second-team All-CAA honors, though the Dukes experienced little on-court success, finishing in last place. After head coach Louis Rowe was fired, Lewis chose to declare for the 2020 NBA draft, though he retained his college eligibility by not hiring an agent.

Ultimately Lewis decided to return to JMU for his senior season under new coach Mark Byington, who helped advise Lewis and his family through the testing process. In advance of his senior season, Lewis was chosen as the preseason CAA Player of the Year, although the Dukes were predicted to finish ninth in the 10-team league. While the Dukes' 2020–21 season were paused several times due to COVID-19 protocols, both Lewis and the Dukes team experienced success. Lewis was named the national player of the week by the United States Basketball Writers Association on January 17, 2021, after hitting a school record nine three-pointers in a 30-point effort against Towson. Lewis' 2020–21 season ended prematurely when he suffered a knee injury on February 14, 2021, and was later ruled out for the remainder of the year. On March 5, he was named the 2021 Colonial Athletic Association Player of the Year.

== Professional career ==
=== Iowa Wolves (2021–2023) ===
After going undrafted in the 2021 NBA draft, Lewis signed with the Minnesota Timberwolves on September 20, 2021. However, he was waived on October 15. On October 26, he signed with the Iowa Wolves as an affiliate player.

=== Le Mans (2023–2024) ===
On July 18, 2023, Lewis signed with Le Mans of the French LNB Pro A.

On June 13, 2024, Lewis was drafted by the Valley Suns in the 2024 NBA G League expansion draft.

=== Karditsa (2024–2025) ===
On August 9, 2024, he moved to Karditsa of the Greek Basketball League.

=== Panionios (2025–present) ===
On June 30, 2025, Lewis joined Panionios of the Greek Basketball League.
