= Payton Willis =

American basketball player (born 1998)

- Payton Willis in maroon Minnesota jersey.

No. 2 – Kolossos Rodou
- Position: Guard
- League: Greek Basketball League

Personal information
- Born: January 31, 1998 (age 28) Fayetteville, Arkansas, U.S.
- Listed height: 6 ft 4 in (1.93 m)
- Listed weight: 200 lb (91 kg)

Career information
- High school: Fayetteville (Fayetteville, Arkansas)
- College: Vanderbilt (2016–2018); Minnesota (2019–2020); College of Charleston (2020–2021); Minnesota (2021–2022)
- NBA draft: 2022: undrafted
- Playing career: 2022–present

Career history
- 2022–2023: Hapoel Gilboa Galil
- 2023–2024: Pistoia 2000
- 2024: Tenerife
- 2024–2026: Vanoli Cremona
- 2026–present: Kolossos H Hotels

Career highlights
- All-LBA Team (2024)

Payton Terrell Willis (born January 31, 1998) is an American basketball player for Kolossos Rodou of the Greek Basketball League. He played college basketball for the Vanderbilt Commodores, the Minnesota Golden Gophers of the Big Ten Conference, and the College of Charleston Cougars.

== Early life ==
He is the son of Curtis Willis and Christy Duggar, and his hometown is Fayetteville, Arkansas. He is 6 feet 4 inches (193 cm) tall, and weighs 200 pounds (91 kg).

Willis attended Fayetteville High School. In his sophomore season, he was named all-conference and all-state. In his junior season, he averaged 15.9 points, 3.6 rebounds, 3.5 assists, and 1.5 steals per game while shooting 44.7% from three-point range. He was again named all-conference and all-state.

== College career ==
In college, Willis played basketball for the Vanderbilt Commodores, the Minnesota Golden Gophers of the Big Ten Conference, and the College of Charleston Cougars.

He played for Vanderbilt in 2016–18. Willis averaged 5.1 points per game. He sat out 2018–19 in accordance with NCAA transfer rules.

Willis played for Minnesota in 2019–20. He averaged 11.8 points per game. The COVID-19 pandemic ended the team's season early.

He played for Charleston as a graduate transfer in 2020–21, where Willis was a hospitality and tourism management major, and was Preseason All-Colonial Athletic Association Honorable Mention. He started every game and averaged 15.9 points per game, 3.1 assists per game (9th in the Colonial Athletic Association), and 1.4 steals per game (5th), shot 40% from 3-point range, and was team co-captain.

Willis played for Minnesota again in 2021–22, as he was allowed to play a fifth season - along with other athletes - given that the pandemic had shortened his earlier seasons, and shifted from shooting guard to point guard. He was team captain and averaged 17.5 points per game and 4.3 assists per game (8th in the Big Ten), while leading the Big Ten in 3-point percentage (.428; the sixth best in team history). In 2022 he was Asheville Championship MVP, All-Big Ten Honorable Mention (Coaches), and All-Big Ten Honorable Mention (Media).

== Professional career ==
In July 2022 he joined the Golden State Warriors for NBA Summer League.

Willis plays in 2022 for Hapoel Gilboa Galil in the Israeli Basketball Premier League, Israel's highest level basketball league, having signed a contract with the team in July 2022.

On July 14, 2023, he signed with Pistoia Basket 2000 of the Lega Basket Serie A (LBA).

On July 8, 2024, he signed with La Laguna Tenerife of the Spanish Liga ACB. On November 4, 2024, he left the team. In four games, he averaged 5.8 points per game.

On November 5, 2024, he signed with Vanoli Cremona of the Italian Lega Basket Serie A (LBA).
