= Atlantic Union Bank Center =

Indoor arena at James Madison University

- Interactive map of Atlantic Union Bank Center
- Location: 645 University Boulevard; Harrisonburg, Virginia
- Coordinates: 38.430436676216985°N 78.85957444213402°W
- Operator: James Madison University
- Capacity: 8,500

Construction
- Groundbreaking: April 2018
- Opened: November 25, 2020
- Architects: Moseley Architects; Populous

Tenant
- James Madison Dukes

Atlantic Union Bank Center is a multi-purpose arena on the campus of James Madison University in Harrisonburg, Virginia that plays host to the James Madison Dukes men's and women's basketball teams. It seats 8,500 and opened for the 2020–21 NCAA Division I men's and women's basketball season, replacing the JMU Convocation Center. Atlantic Union Bank is the arena's naming partner.

The first games at the arena were played on November 25, 2020, when the men's team beat Limestone University 89–55, followed by the women's team winning 69–55 over Mount St. Mary's University.

Atlantic Union Bank Center was the host of the 2021 CAA men's basketball tournament. The conference moved the men's basketball tournament to Harrisonburg from the Entertainment and Sports Arena in Washington, D.C. as a result of the ongoing COVID-19 pandemic. The tournament was won by Drexel University.
