= SECU =

Secu or SECU may refer to:

- Secu – a commune in Dolj County, Romania
- SECU – a common abbreviation for State Employees Credit Union
  - North Carolina State Employees Credit Union
  - Pennsylvania State Employees Credit Union
  - South Carolina State Employees Credit Union
  - State Employees Credit Union of New Mexico
  - State Employees Credit Union of Maryland
  - Washington State Employees Credit Union
- abbreviation for the Canadian House of Commons Standing Committee on Public Safety and National Security
- SECU – an academic arm of the Southeastern Conference
- SECU (container) – Stora Enso Cargo Unit, a type of shipping container
- The ICAO airport code for Mariscal Lamar Airport in Cuenca, Ecuador
