= PSECU =

Not-for-profit financial cooperative

PSECU Pennsylvania State Employees Credit Union
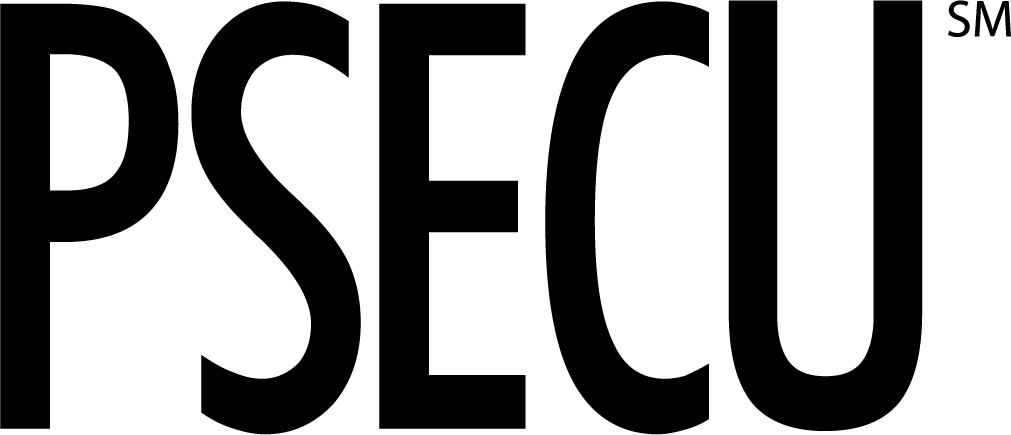
- Company type: Credit union
- Industry: Financial services
- Founded: 1934
- Headquarters: Harrisburg, Pennsylvania, United States
- Key people: George Rudolph (President and CEO)
- Products: Savings; checking; consumer loans; mortgages; credit cards; online banking
- Total assets: ▲US$7.5 billion (2020)
- Number of employees: 900
- Subsidiaries: PSECU Financial Services
- Website: www.psecu.com

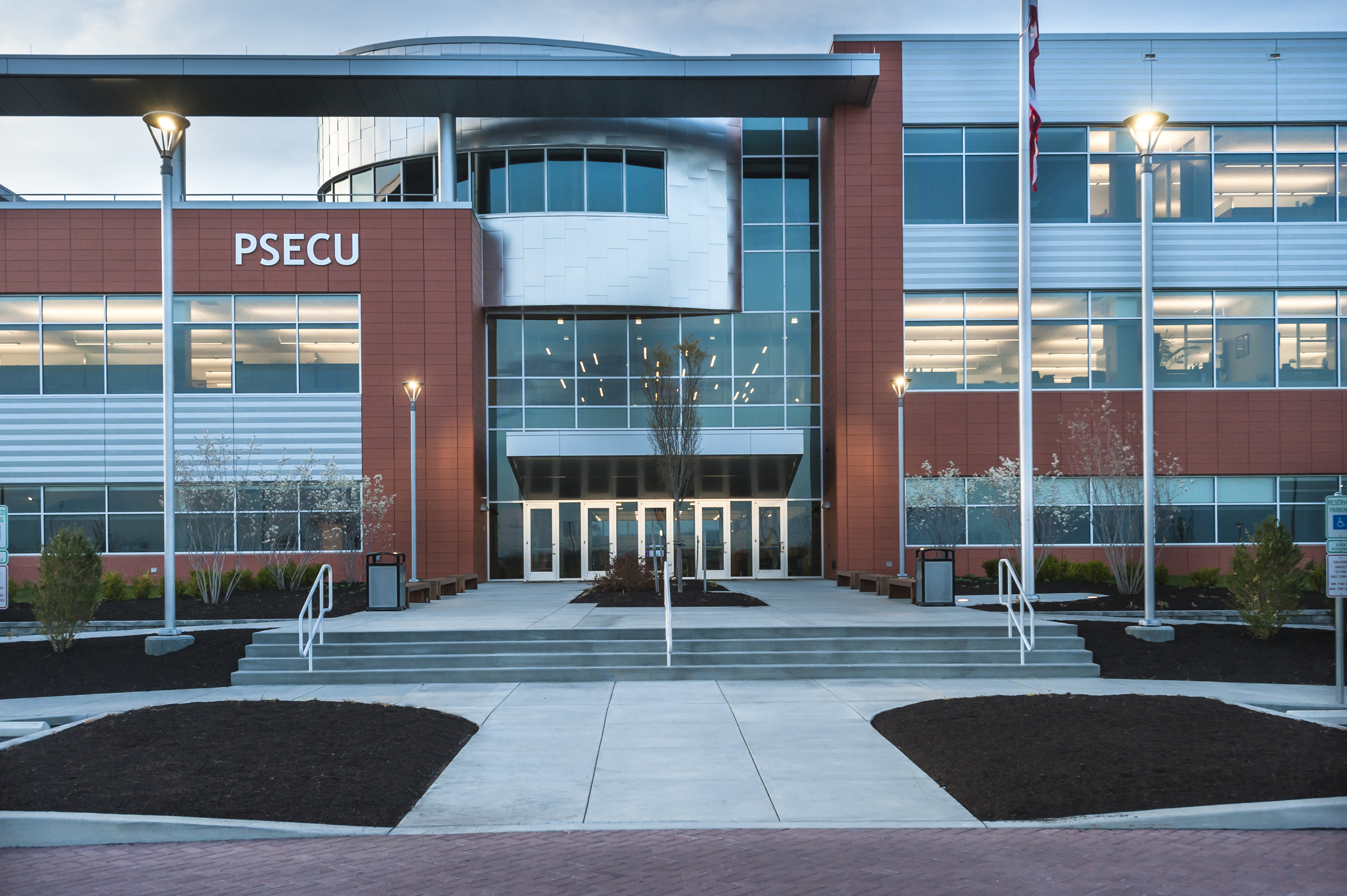
PSECU headquarters in Harrisburg, Pennsylvania

PSECU (also known as Pennsylvania State Employees Credit Union) is a state-chartered credit union headquartered in Harrisburg, Pennsylvania. PSECU is a not-for-profit financial entity that serves more than 480,000 members and manages over $7.5 billion in assets. Deposits by the members are regulated and insured by National Credit Union Administration (NCUA).

== History ==
PSECU was started in 1934 by 22 state employees who pooled $90 in assets to found the credit union and provide better lives for their families.

In 2022, PSECU was named as the Best-In-State credit union for the fourth year by Forbes. That same year, PSECU's president and chief executive officer, George Rudolph, was named to the Banking & Finance Power List. PSECU's management philosophy in 2022 was described, in part, by Barb Bowker, PSECU's chief member experience officer, as follows: "Tapping into someone’s emotions — giving them a truly great experience as a member — is what builds loyalty and helps retain members for a lifetime."

== See also ==
- State ECU
- State Employees Credit Union of Maryland
- State Employees Credit Union (North Carolina)
- S.C. State Credit Union
- Washington State Employees Credit Union
