= Washington State Employees Credit Union =

Not-for-profit financial cooperative

WSECU
- Company type: Credit union
- Industry: Financial services
- Founded: 1957
- Headquarters: Olympia, Washington
- Number of locations: 22 branch banks
- Area served: Washington State
- Key people: Gary Swindler (President & CEO)
- Products: Savings; checking; consumer loans; mortgages; credit cards; investments; online banking; Payday loan alternative
- Net income: ▼US$4.4 million (2024)
- Total assets: ▼US$5.1 billion (2024)
- Members: 293,651 (2025)
- Number of employees: 747
- Subsidiaries: WSECU Investment Management; One Washington Financial
- Website: wsecu.org

Washington State Employees Credit Union (WSECU) is an American not-for-profit financial cooperative and the fourth largest credit union in the state of Washington. Membership is open to those who live, work, or worship in the state, and their relatives.

As a financial cooperative, WSECU is overseen by an all-volunteer Board of Directors and Supervisory Committee who are WSECU members elected by fellow members.

== History ==
WSECU was founded on July 17, 1957 by 40 Washington state government employees. The charter was initially limited to employees of Local No. 443, but expanded in 1958 to include all state employees, Washington State Employees Association and the Washington Federation of State Employees and Credit Union Employees. In 2013, WSECU became a community-chartered credit union.

The credit union experienced steady growth over the next two decades and expanded with four new branches during the 1970s. A merger with Lewis County Employees Credit Union in 1984 established another branch, with two more added in that decade. In the 1990s, five more branches opened, including a cooperative branch with Twin Star Credit Union. Early in the millennial decade, the credit union further expanded with two additional branches while surpassing the $1 billion mark. In 2007, a milestone was reached when WSECU celebrated its 50th year of service. In 2009, WSECU opened its third and current headquarters building in downtown Olympia. It was sustainably built and was awarded LEEDS Gold by the U.S. Green Building Council.

In 2023, WSECU completed a merger with the State Highway Credit Union, which added one more branch in Union Gap, Washington.

== Locations ==
Headquartered in Thurston County, WSECU serves members throughout Washington state. Branches are located in Bellevue, Chehalis, Everett, Lacey, Lakewood, Olympia, Seattle and Tumwater in western Washington; and Ellensburg, Medical Lake, Pullman, Spokane, Spokane Valley and Yakima in eastern Washington.

== Community support programs ==
WSECU is a supporter of the communities it serves, providing sponsorships, financial support and employee volunteerism. In 2017 the credit union partnered with Hands On Children's Museum of Olympia to launch the Learning for All Initiative, helping to expand museum programs and offer free access to underserved families in Thurston County. Four percent of the annual net income is reserved for community give-back to local non-profits that fall within the credit union's three pillars of giving: Education, Self-sufficiency and Public Employees and Assets.

=== Scholarships ===
WSECU scholarships are available to any WSECU member who is pursuing higher education and meets the qualifications. Annual scholarships are awarded to 29 recipients and are broken into two categories: two-year community colleges and four-year colleges and universities.

== See also ==
- Pennsylvania State Employees Credit Union
- State Employees Credit Union of Maryland
- State Employees Credit Union of New Mexico
- State Employees Credit Union (North Carolina)
- S.C. State Credit Union
