= USS North Carolina (BB-55) =

Fast battleship of the United States Navy

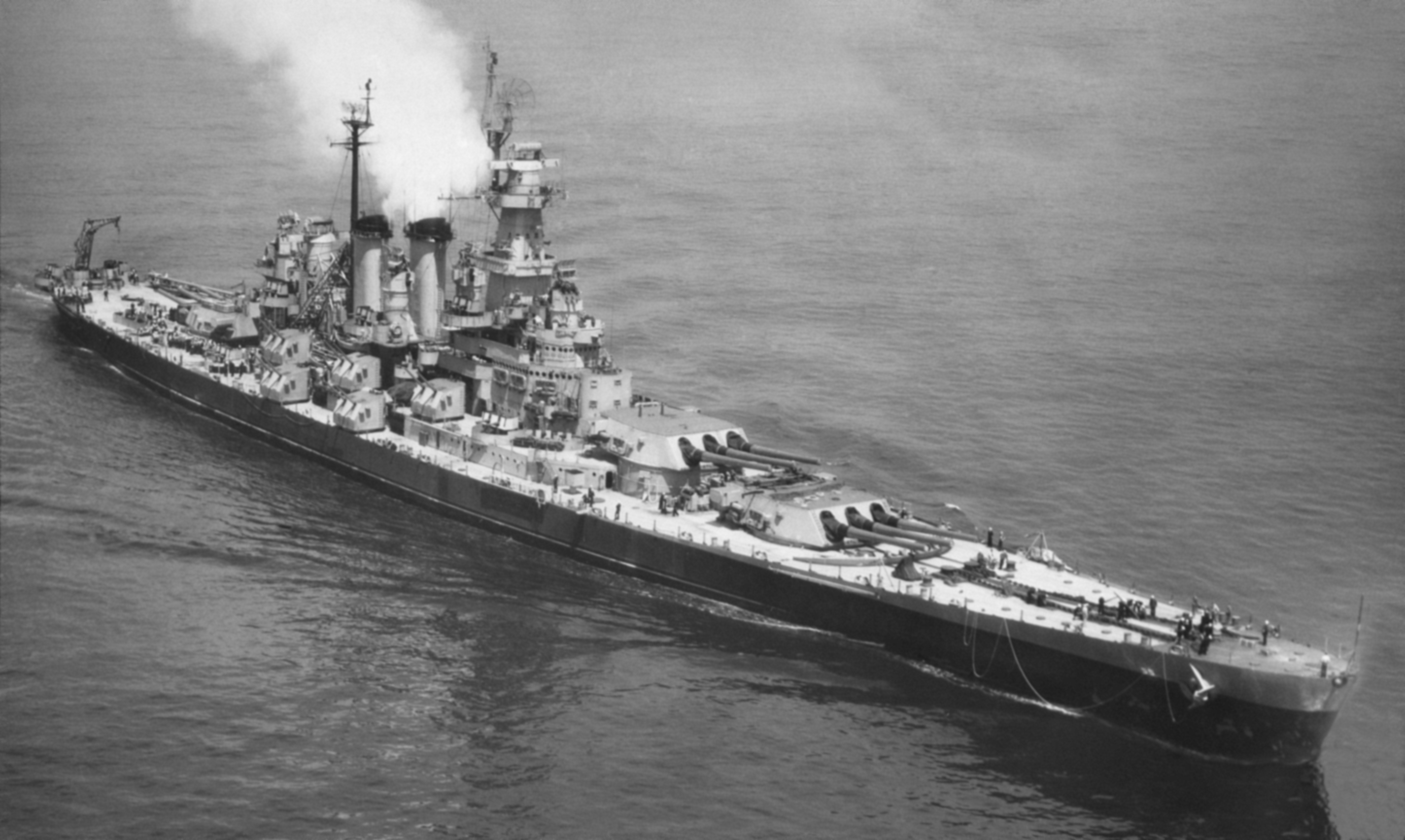
- North Carolina underway on 3 June 1946.

History

United States
- Name: North Carolina
- Namesake: North Carolina
- Owner: US Navy
- Ordered: 1 August 1937
- Builder: New York Naval Shipyard
- Laid down: 27 October 1937
- Launched: 13 June 1940
- Commissioned: 9 April 1941
- Decommissioned: 27 June 1947
- Stricken: 1 June 1960
- Nickname(s): "Showboat"
- Status: Museum ship since 29 April 1962 in Wilmington, North Carolina

General characteristics
- Class & type: North Carolina-class battleship
- Displacement: Standard: 35,000 long tons (35,562 t); Full load: 44,800 long tons (45,519 t)
- Length: 728 ft 9 in (222.12 m)
- Beam: 108 ft 4 in (33.02 m)
- Draft: 32 ft 11.5 in (10.046 m)
- Installed power: 8 × Babcock & Wilcox boilers; 121,000 shp (90,000 kW)
- Propulsion: 4 × General Electric steam turbines; 4 × screw propellers
- Speed: 28 knots (52 km/h; 32 mph)
- Range: 17,450 nmi (32,320 km; 20,080 mi) at 15 knots (28 km/h; 17 mph)
- Complement: 1,800
- Armament: 9 × 16 in (406 mm)/45 caliber Mark 6 guns; 20 × 5 in (127 mm)/38 caliber dual-purpose guns; 16 × 1.1 in (28 mm) anti-aircraft guns; 18 × .50-cal machine guns
- Armor: Belt: 12 in (305 mm); Gun turret: 16 in (406 mm); Deck: 5.5 in (140 mm); Conning tower: 14.7 in (373 mm)
- Aircraft carried: 3 × Vought OS2U Kingfisher floatplanes
- Aviation facilities: 2 × trainable catapults on her fantail

USS North Carolina, hull number BB-55, is the lead ship of the North Carolina class of fast battleships, the first vessel of the type built for the United States Navy. Built under the Washington Treaty system, North Carolina's design was limited in displacement and armament, though the United States used a clause in the Second London Naval Treaty to increase the main battery from the original armament of twelve 14-inch (356 mm) guns in quadruple turrets to nine 16 in (406 mm) guns in triple turrets. The ship was laid down in 1937 and completed in April 1941, while the United States was still neutral during World War II.

Following the Japanese attack on Pearl Harbor in December, North Carolina mobilized for war and was initially sent to counter a possible sortie by the German battleship Tirpitz, though this did not materialize and North Carolina was promptly transferred to the Pacific to strengthen Allied forces during the Guadalcanal campaign. There, she screened aircraft carriers engaged in the campaign and took part in the Battle of the Eastern Solomons on 24–25 August 1942, where she shot down several Japanese aircraft. The next month, she was torpedoed by a Japanese submarine but was not seriously damaged. After repairs, she returned to the campaign and continued to screen carriers during the campaigns across the central Pacific in 1943 and 1944, including the Gilberts and Marshall Islands and the Mariana and Palau Islands, where she saw action during the Battle of the Philippine Sea.

The ship was undergoing a refit during the invasion of the Philippines but took part in the later stages of the Philippines campaign and was present when the fleet was damaged by Typhoon Cobra. She took part in offensive operations in support of the Battles of Iwo Jima and Okinawa in 1945, including numerous attacks on Japan. Following the surrender of Japan in August, she carried American personnel home during Operation Magic Carpet. North Carolina operated briefly off the east coast of the United States in 1946 before being decommissioned the next year and placed in reserve. Stricken from the Naval Vessel Register in 1960, the ship was saved from the breaker's yard by a campaign to preserve the vessel as a museum ship in her namesake state. In 1962, the North Carolina museum was opened in Wilmington, North Carolina.

== Design ==
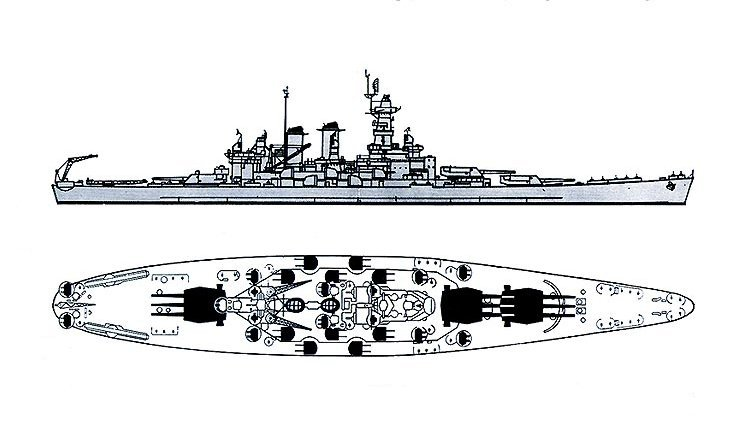
Recognition drawing of the North Carolina class

The North Carolina class was the first new battleship design built under the Washington Naval Treaty system; her design was bound by the terms of the Second London Naval Treaty of 1936, which added a restriction on her main battery of guns that they be no larger than 14 inches (356 mm). The General Board evaluated a number of designs ranging from traditional 23-knot (43 km/h; 26 mph) battleships akin to the "standard" series or fast battleships, and ultimately a fast battleship armed with twelve 14-inch guns was selected. After the ships were authorized, however, the United States invoked the escalator clause in the treaty that permitted an increase to 16 in (406 mm) guns in the event that any member nation refused to sign the treaty, which Japan refused to do.

North Carolina is 728 feet 9 inches (222.12 m) long overall and has a beam of 108 ft 4 in (33.02 m) and a draft of 32 ft 11.5 in (10.046 m). Her standard displacement amounted to 35,000 long tons (35,562 t) and increased to 44,800 long tons (45,519 t) at full combat load. The ship was powered by four General Electric steam turbines, each driving one propeller shaft, using steam provided by eight oil-fired Babcock & Wilcox boilers. Rated at 121,000 shaft horsepower (90,000 kW), the turbines were intended to give a top speed of 28 knots (52 km/h; 32 mph). The ship had a cruising range of 17,450 nautical miles (32,320 km; 20,080 mi) at a speed of 15 knots (28 km/h; 17 mph). She carried three Vought OS2U Kingfisher floatplanes for aerial reconnaissance, which were launched by a pair of aircraft catapults on her fantail. Her peace time crew numbered 1,800 officers and enlisted men, but during the war the crew swelled to 99 officers and 2,035 enlisted.

The ship is armed with a main battery of nine 16 in /45 caliber Mark 6 guns (Note: /45 refers to the length of the gun in terms of calibers. A /45 gun is 45 times long as it is in bore diameter.) in a trio of three-gun turrets on the centerline, two of which were placed in a superfiring pair forward, with the third aft. The secondary battery consisted of twenty 5 in (127 mm) /38 caliber dual-purpose guns mounted in twin turrets clustered amidships, five turrets on either side. As designed, the ship was equipped with an anti-aircraft battery of sixteen 1.1 in (28 mm) /75-caliber guns and eighteen .50-caliber (12.7 mm) M2 Browning machine guns, (Note: In the context of small arms, caliber refers to the bore diameter; in this case, a .50-caliber machine gun is a half-inch in diameter.) but her anti-aircraft battery was expanded greatly during her career.

The main armored belt is 12 in (305 mm) thick, while the main armored deck is up to 5.5 in (140 mm) thick. The main battery gun turrets have 16 in (406 mm) thick faces, and they were mounted atop barbettes that were protected with the same thickness of steel. The conning tower had 14.7 in (373 mm) thick sides. The ship's armor layout was designed with opponents equipped with 14-inch guns in mind, but since the treaty system broke down just before construction began, her design could not be revised to improve the scale of protection to defend against heavier guns. Despite this shortcoming, the North Carolina class proved to be more successful battleships than the better-armored but very cramped South Dakota class.

=== Modifications ===
North Carolina received a number of upgrades over the course of her career, primarily consisting of radar and improved anti-aircraft batteries. By November 1942, the ship had received three Mark 3 fire-control radar sets for the main battery, four Mark 4 radars for the secondary guns, a CXAM air-search radar, and an SG surface-search radar. During her early 1944 refit, she received an SK air-search radar in place of the CXAM and a second SG radar; her Mark 3 radars were replaced with more advanced Mark 8 sets, though she retained one of the Mark 3s as a backup. In September, the SK radar was replaced with an SK-2 set, and her Mark 4 radars were replaced with a combination of Mark 12 and Mark 22 sets. After the war, she received a secondary SR air search radar and an SCR-720 search radar.

During her refit in late 1942, North Carolina's anti-aircraft battery was replaced with ten quadruple-mount 40 mm (1.6 in) Bofors guns (forty guns), and forty-six 20 mm (0.79 in) Oerlikon autocannon in single mounts. By June 1943, her anti-aircraft armament had been increased with four more 40 mm quadruple mounts, and in November, an additional mount was added atop the rear main battery turret, giving her 60 Bofors guns in 15 quad mounts. Two more 20 mm cannon were added by late 1944, and another eight were installed in April 1945. By the end of the war in August, her 20 mm battery had been reduced to eight twin mounts and twenty single mounts.

== Service history ==
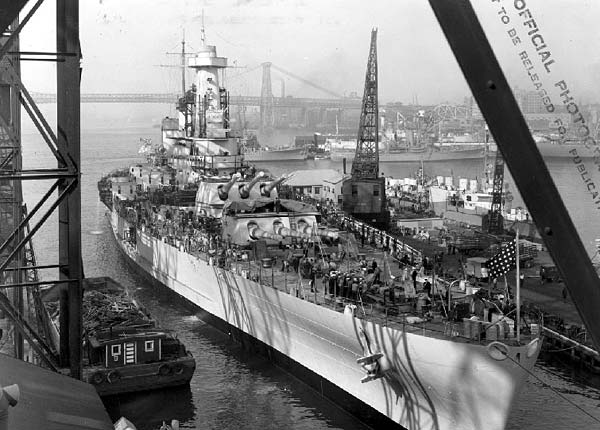
Fitting-out stage, 17 April 1941

The keel for North Carolina was laid down at the New York Naval Shipyard on 27 October 1937. Her completed hull was launched on 13 June 1940 and the ship was commissioned into the fleet on 9 April 1941 in a ceremony attended by Governor of North Carolina J. Melville Broughton. The ship's first commanding officer was Captain Olaf M. Hustvedt. North Carolina embarked on her shakedown cruise in the Caribbean Sea and spent the rest of the year working up while the United States remained neutral during World War II. Following the Japanese attack on Pearl Harbor on 7 December, North Carolina began extensive battle training to prepare for combat in the Pacific War.

Her first operation came in April 1942, when she was deployed to Naval Station Argentia on 23 April as part of a force intended to block a potential sortie by the German battleship Tirpitz if she attempted to break out into the convoy lanes of the North Atlantic. Tirpitz remained in Norway, however, and North Carolina was quickly replaced by the battleship South Dakota, allowing North Carolina to get underway for the Pacific in mid-1942. She passed through the Panama Canal on 10 June in company with the aircraft carriers Wasp and Long Island and nine destroyers. On 15 June, North Carolina was assigned to Task Force (TF) 18, centered on Wasp, along with four cruisers and nine destroyers, under the command of Rear Admiral Leigh Noyes.

=== Guadalcanal campaign ===
North Carolina was sent to join the Guadalcanal campaign as part of TF 16, which also included the aircraft carrier Enterprise, the heavy cruiser Portland, the light cruiser Atlanta, and six destroyers. The unit was part of TF 61, commanded by Vice Admiral Frank Fletcher, and sent to cover the landing of the 1st Marine Division on Guadalcanal to seize the airfield being constructed there by the Japanese. TF 61 also included the carriers Saratoga and Wasp. North Carolina covered Enterprise on the first day of the invasion of Guadalcanal and Tulagi on 7 August, and thereafter remained in company with Enterprise to protect the carrier from Japanese air attacks. Fear of Japanese land-based torpedo bombers prompted Fletcher to withdraw the carrier groups the next day. The initial landing met little resistance, but a Japanese cruiser squadron attacked the invasion fleet on the night of 9 August, inflicting a major defeat on Allied naval forces in the Battle of Savo Island. The Navy briefly considered forming a surface combat force to counter the Japanese cruisers that would have been centered on North Carolina, with five heavy and one light cruiser and four destroyers, but it was determined that the need to protect the carrier task forces was too great to strip away their heavy units.

In this role, she participated in the Battle of the Eastern Solomons on 24–25 August. American forces had detected a group of Japanese carriers on the 24th and immediately launched attacks from Saratoga that sank the light carrier Ryūjō. A Japanese counterattack struck the American fleet, and North Carolina was the first to detect it, shortly after 16:00, using her air-search radar. The Japanese initially concentrated on Enterprise, and North Carolina contributed her anti-aircraft fire to her defense. Enterprise increased speed to 30 knots (56 km/h; 35 mph), causing North Carolina to drop back, ultimately falling to around 4,000 yards (3,700 m) astern. A group of seven Aichi D3A dive bombers attacked North Carolina at 16:43 but they all missed. North Carolina emerged from the battle unscathed, though one man was killed by a strafing aircraft. Enterprise was hit by three bombs but aircraft from Saratoga severely damaged the seaplane tender Chitose in return.

North Carolina's anti-aircraft claimed to have shot down between 7 and 14 aircraft, though evaluation of the gunners' effectiveness is mixed. The historian Richard B. Frank noted that the Japanese lost a total of eighteen D3As and credited Enterprise's Grumman F4F Wildcat fighters with half of them, with the rest shot down by the ships, "with the lion's share to gunners aboard Enterprise. The naval analyst Norman Friedman highlighted the effectiveness of the 5-inch guns aboard Enterprise and North Carolina, but noted that the ship had difficulty tracking targets with her fire control radar, owing to a combination of rapid maneuvering to avoid attacks, excessive vibration from steaming at high speed, and the number of friendly and hostile aircraft aloft. Contemporary observers took an optimistic view of the ship's performance; her captain credited her with shooting down five to seven aircraft, Admiral Chester W. Nimitz, the Commander, U.S. Pacific Fleet, noted that her 5-inch fire was particularly effective in dissuading Japanese attacks.

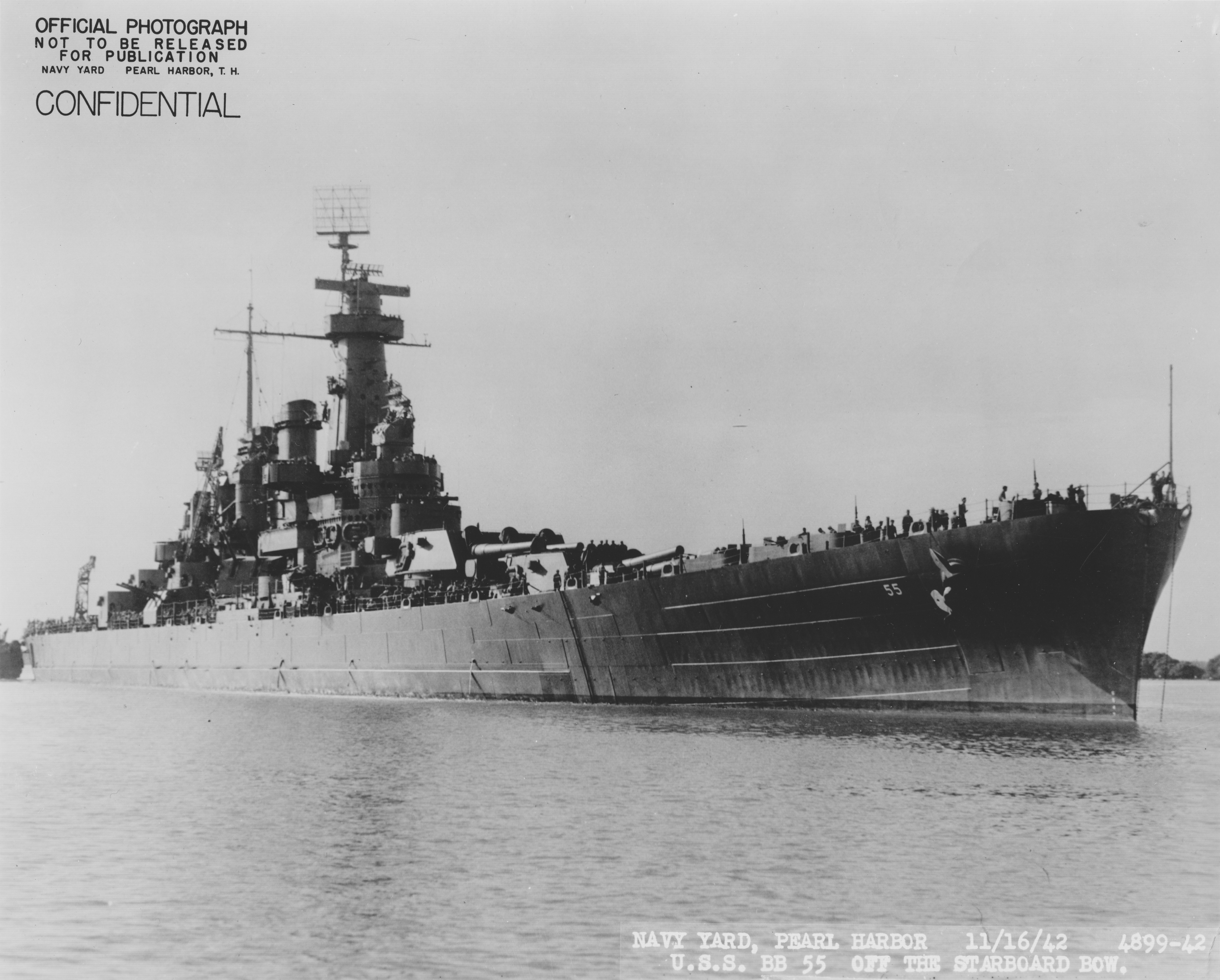
North Carolina in Pearl Harbor in November 1942 for repairs

While Enterprise withdrew for repairs, North Carolina was transferred to TF 17 to cover Saratoga, along with Atlanta and a pair of destroyers. The ships operated off Guadalcanal for the next several weeks, during which time Japanese submarines attempted to torpedo North Carolina twice. The first, on 6 September, passed some 300 yd (270 m) off her port side, but the second, from the submarine I-19 on 15 September, damaged the ship. I-19 had fired a spread of six torpedoes at Wasp in TF 18, two or three of which hit. Two of the Type 95 torpedoes continued on to the ships of TF 17, some 5 nautical miles (9.3 km; 5.8 mi) away. One hit the destroyer O'Brien, and a fourth hit North Carolina. The hit on North Carolina struck the ship 20 ft (6.1 m) below the waterline on her port side and tore a 32-by-18-foot (9.8 by 5.5 m) hole in the plating. Five men were killed in the attack, but the torpedo inflicted little serious damage, apart from the shock of the blast that disabled the forward turret. Flooding occurred and North Carolina took on a list of 5.5 degrees to port, but this was quickly corrected with counter-flooding and she was able to remain on station with Saratoga, cruising at a speed of 25 knots (46 km/h; 29 mph). The other two ships were not so lucky, with Wasp being scuttled that evening and O'Brien eventually foundering a month later when her hull finally buckled from the damage. After withdrawing from the area, North Carolina was detached to Pearl Harbor to make repairs, which lasted from 30 September to 17 November.

After returning to the South Pacific, North Carolina resumed screening Saratoga and Enterprise, which had also completed repairs by this time. The American fleet had been strengthened by North Carolina's sister ship Washington, which served as the flagship of Rear Admiral Willis Lee. The two battleships were grouped together as TF 64 under Lee's command. The ships covered convoys carrying soldiers and supplies to the Solomon Islands for the rest of 1942 and into 1943 as the Guadalcanal campaign ground on. These operations included covering a group of seven transports carrying elements of the 25th Infantry Division to Guadalcanal from 1 to 4 January 1943. During another of these convoy operations later that month, the battleships, which by this time had been reinforced by the battleship Indiana, were too far south to be able to reach the American cruiser force during the Battle of Rennell Island at the end of the month.

North Carolina returned to Pearl Harbor in March for a refit that lasted for more than a month and included the installation of radars and improved fire control equipment. On returning to the South Pacific, she joined the battleship group of TF 36, now commanded by Rear Admiral Glenn B. Davis and consisting of Indiana and Massachusetts. The battleship and carrier groups covered amphibious assault forces during Operation Cartwheel, the campaign to isolate the Japanese stronghold at Rabaul, in late June and early July. They did not see action during the campaign, as fighting was limited to both sides' light forces. In September, she made another trip to Pearl Harbor to make preparations for the attack on the Gilbert Islands.

=== Gilbert and Marshall Islands campaign ===
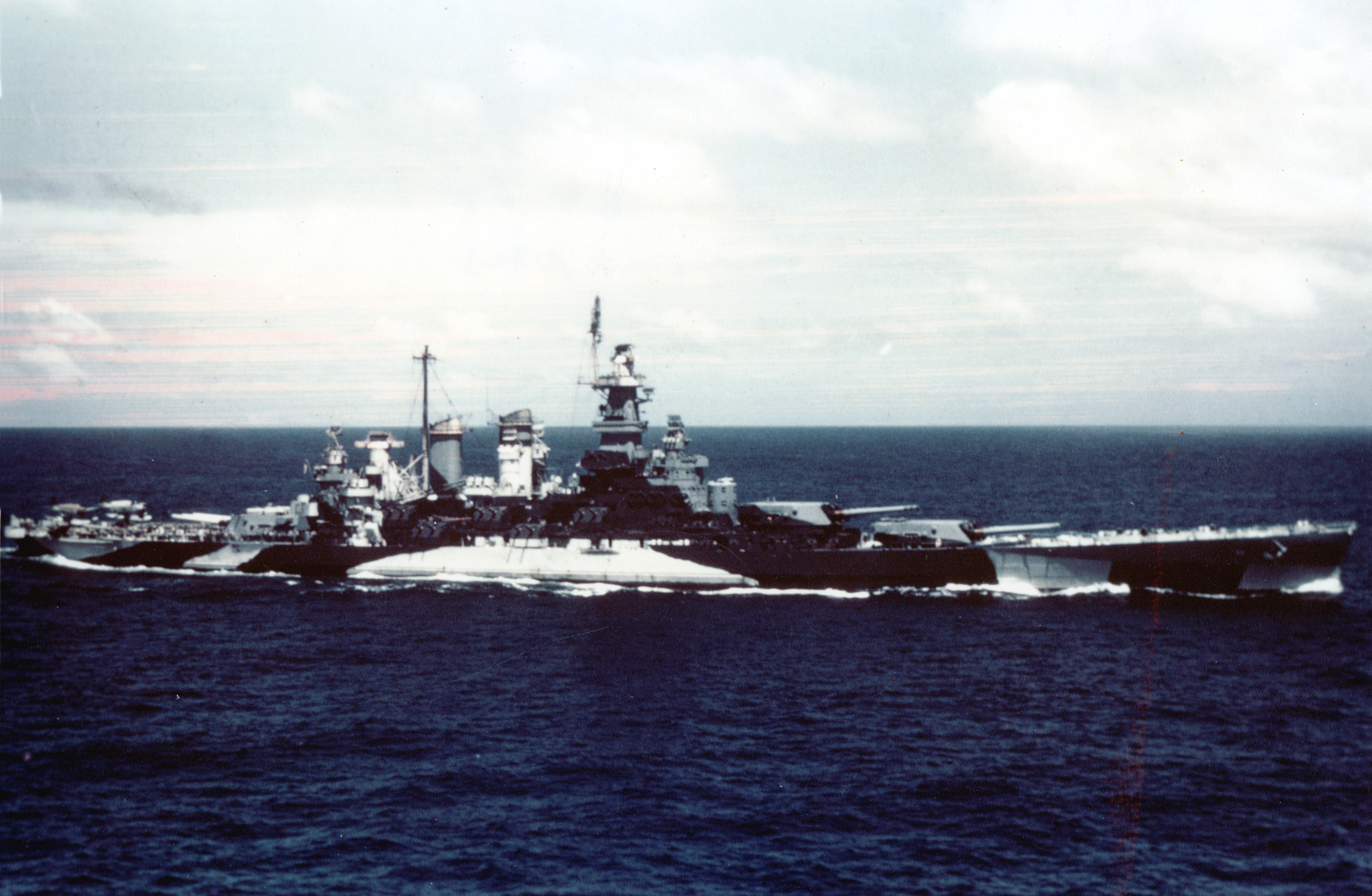
North Carolina underway during the Gilberts campaign

For the assault on the Gilberts, the fleet was organized into TF 50, which was divided into several task groups (TG). The ship sortied on 10 November, once again in company with Enterprise as part of TG 50.2 to support the Gilbert and Marshall Islands campaign, which began with assaults on Makin, Tarawa, and Abemama. The group also included Massachusetts and Indiana and a pair of light carriers and six destroyers. North Carolina covered the carriers while they raided the islands beginning on 19 November. On 8 December, North Carolina was detached to form TG 50.8 with the other battleships of the fleet—Massachusetts, Indiana, South Dakota, and Washington—again under Lee's command. The ships bombarded the island of Nauru while the fleet prepared for the next operation in the campaign in the Marshalls. North Carolina then escorted the carrier Bunker Hill during a series of strikes on Kavieng on the island of New Ireland in late December.

On 6 January 1944, TF 58, the fast carrier task force, was created under the command of Rear Admiral Marc Mitscher; North Carolina continued in her role as an escort for the fleet's carriers with the unit as part of TG 58.2. During the Battle of Kwajalein, North Carolina initially remained with the carriers during the pre-invasion bombardment, but was then detached to close with the island and join the bombardment group targeting Roi-Namur, which also included Washington, Indiana, and Massachusetts. During the attack, she sank a cargo ship in the harbor. After the islands were conquered in four days of heavy fighting, TF 58 departed to raid Truk, which had been Japan's primary staging area in the central Pacific. By this time, North Carolina had been transferred to TG 58.3. The attack, codenamed Operation Hailstone, inflicted serious damage, sinking or destroying 39 ships, destroying 211 aircraft and damaging another 104 planes.

With the Marshalls and Gilberts secured, the fast carrier task force embarked on a series of raids in the central Pacific to prepare for the upcoming attack on the Mariana Islands. The fleet sortied from Majuro, its new base in the Marshalls, in late March to begin the first attack on Palau and Woleai, conducted from 31 March to 1 April. During these operations, North Carolina shot down a Japanese aircraft. The fleet then sailed south to support the US Army's landing at Hollandia during the New Guinea campaign from 13 to 24 April. Another attack on Truk followed on 29–30 April; North Carolina shot down another Japanese aircraft during the attack. Two of her Kingfisher floatplanes were sent to rescue a downed pilot who had crashed off the reef; one of them capsized on landing and the second was unable to take off with the additional weight from the first plane's crew and the pilot they had gone to pick up, so the submarine Tang picked up the men instead. On 1 May, North Carolina and six other battleships organized as TG 58.7 bombarded Pohnpei, destroying Japanese artillery batteries, anti-aircraft guns, and damaging the airfield on the island. TF 58 then returned to its bases in Majuro and Eniwetok on 4 May; from there, North Carolina departed to Pearl Harbor for repairs to her rudder.

=== Mariana and Palau Islands campaign ===
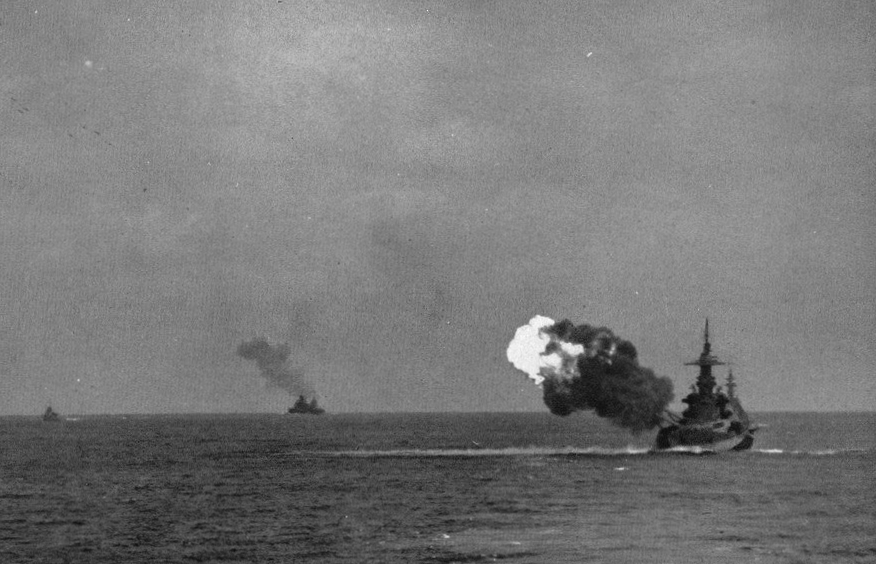
North Carolina firing a broadside, c. 1944

After completing repairs, North Carolina rejoined the fleet at Majuro while it was preparing for the attack on the Marianas. On arriving, she returned to TG 58.7, which was distributed between the four carrier task groups. She and the rest of TF 58 sortied on 6 June to launch the first assault in the campaign, targeting the island of Saipan. In addition to screening the carriers, North Carolina also bombarded the island to cover the minesweepers as they cleared paths to the invasion beach. She shelled Tanapag Harbor, sank several small vessels, and destroyed several supply dumps. On 15 June, the marines went ashore and a Japanese counterattack struck the fleet, though all but two of the aircraft were shot down by the carriers' combat air patrol; of those two, North Carolina shot one down. The landing was a breach of Japan's inner defensive perimeter that triggered the Japanese fleet to launch a major counter-thrust with the 1st Mobile Fleet, the main carrier strike force.

As the Japanese fleet approached, North Carolina and the rest of TF 58 steamed to meet it on 18 June, leading to the Battle of the Philippine Sea on 19–20 June. North Carolina and the other battleships, with four cruisers and thirteen destroyers, were deployed some 15 nautical miles (28 km; 17 mi) west of the carrier groups to screen the likely path of approach. The Japanese launched their aircraft first, and as they probed the American fleet's defenses, North Carolina and Washington were the first battleships to open fire on the attacking Japanese aircraft. During the action, which was fought primarily by the carriers, the US fleet inflicted serious losses on the Japanese, destroying hundreds of their aircraft and sinking three carriers. In the course of the battle, North Carolina shot down two Japanese aircraft. North Carolina remained on station off the Marianas for the next two weeks before being detached for an overhaul at the Puget Sound Navy Yard.

=== Later operations ===
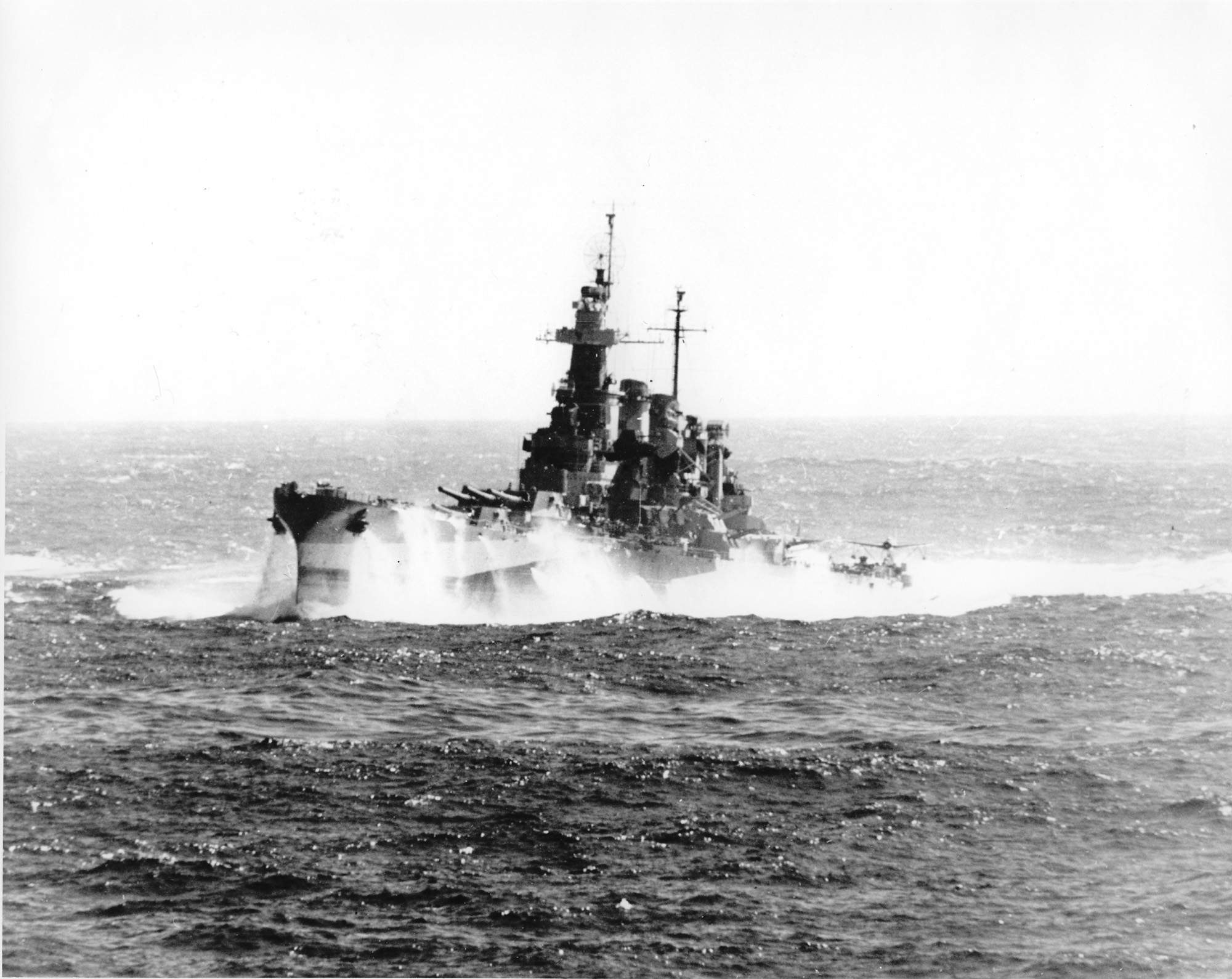
North Carolina in heavy seas in December 1944

Repairs lasted through October, keeping North Carolina from participating in much of the Philippines campaign, and she rejoined the fleet at its new forward base at Ulithi on 7 November. There, she joined TG 38.3, the fast carrier task force having passed from Fifth Fleet to Third Fleet command and accordingly being renumbered from 50-series to 30-series designations. The carriers then embarked on a series of strikes on Japanese positions on Leyte, Luzon, and the Visayas to support Army operations ashore. During these operations, North Carolina shot down a kamikaze suicide aircraft. The attacks continued into mid-December and intensified during the invasion of Mindoro on 15 December. Three days later, the fleet was cruising off the Philippines when it was hit by Typhoon Cobra. North Carolina was not seriously damaged, but three destroyers were sunk in the storm.

After returning to Ulithi, the fast carrier task force began a series of strikes on targets on Formosa, the coast of French Indochina, occupied China, and the Ryukyu Islands in January 1945. North Carolina remained in TG 38.3 for the operation, and her carrier group struck northern Formosa on 3–4 January, but poor weather hampered flight operations. Further attacks struck targets on Luzon on 6 and 7 January to destroy reserves of kamikazes there. On 10 January, the carrier groups entered the South China Sea to strike targets in French Indochina on the assumption that significant Japanese naval forces were present, but only merchant ships and a number of minor warships were caught and sunk there. During these raids, other elements of the Allied fleet invaded Lingayen Gulf on Luzon.

In February, she escorted carriers during attacks on the Japanese island of Honshu to disrupt Japanese air forces that might interfere with the planned invasion of Iwo Jima in the Bonin Islands. Fifth Fleet had re-assumed command of the fast carrier task force by this point, and North Carolina was now part of TG 58.4. The fleet sortied from Ulithi on 10 February, and after conducting training exercises off Tinian on the 12th, refueled at sea on 14 February and continued on north to launch strikes on the Tokyo area two days later. The raids continued through 17 February and the next day, the fleet withdrew to refuel and TG 58.4 was sent to hit other islands in the Bonin chain to further isolate Iwo Jima. During the preparatory bombardment for that attack, North Carolina, Washington, and the heavy cruiser Indianapolis were detached from the task group to reinforce TF 54, the assault force for the invasion; she remained on station during the marine assault and provided fire support as they fought their way across the island through 22 February. The next day, the carrier groups reassembled and refueled on 24 February for further operations against the Japanese mainland.

After leaving Iwo Jima, the fleet resumed air attacks on the Home Islands to prepare for the next amphibious assault on Okinawa in the Ryukyus. The first of these, on 25 and 26 February, hit targets in the Tokyo area, followed by another attack on Iwo Jima the next day. The fleet refueled on 28 February and on 1 March raided Okinawa, thereafter returning to Ulithi on 4 March. While in Ulithi, the fleet was reorganized and North Carolina was transferred to TG 58.3. The fleet sortied on 14 March for additional attacks on Japan; the ships refueled on 16 March on the way and they launched their aircraft two days later to hit targets on Kyushu. The attacks continued into the next day, causing significant damage to Japanese facilities on the island and sinking or damaging numerous warships. The task groups withdrew to refuel and reorganize on 22 March, as several carriers had been damaged by kamikaze and air attacks. The carriers Wasp and Franklin were badly damaged by bombs, and North Carolina was assigned to the group of ships tasked with escorting them back to Ulithi for repairs.

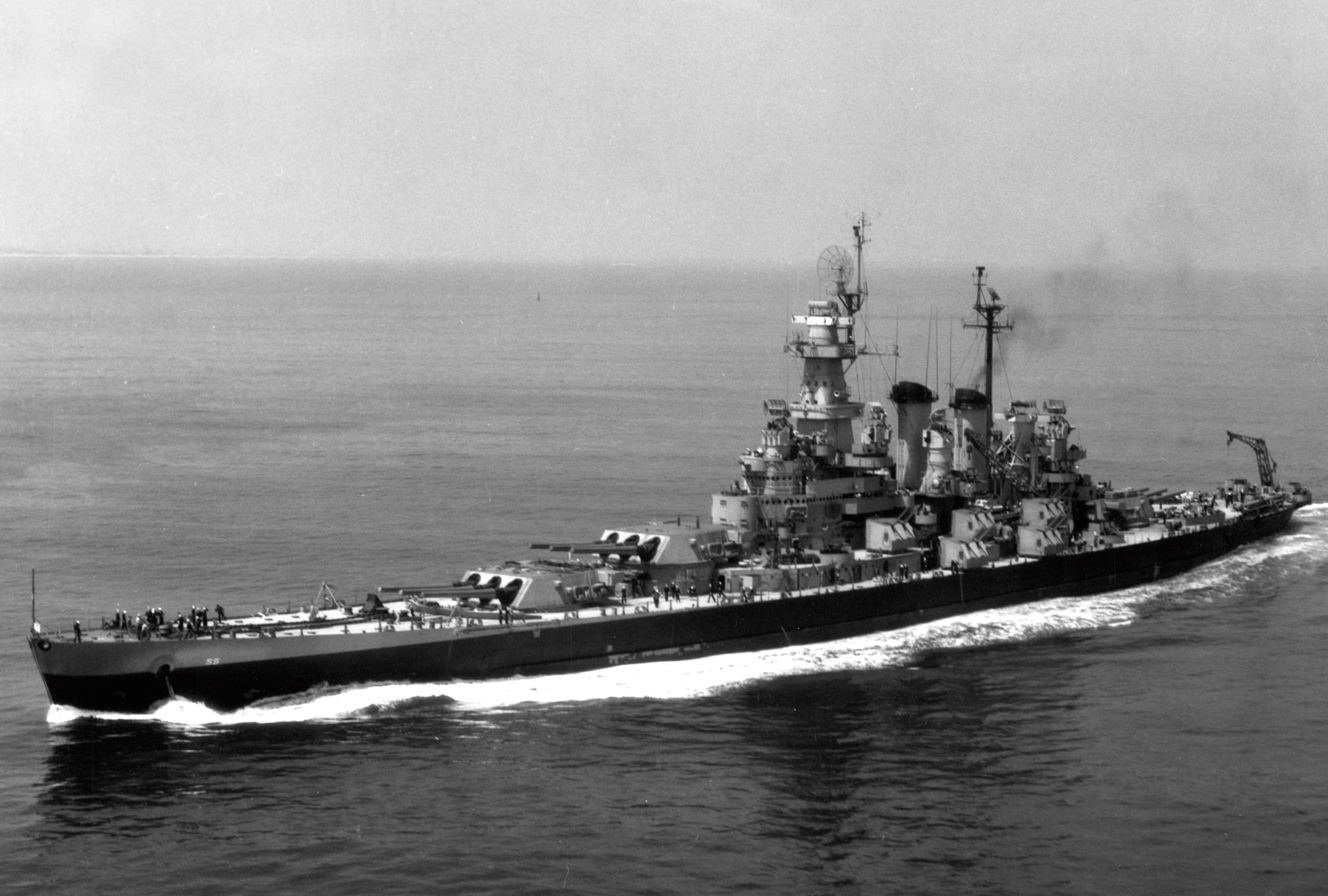
North Carolina off New York in June 1946

Carrier raids on the Home Islands and the Ryukyus continued after the landing on Okinawa on 1 April. When North Carolina returned to the fleet, she was assigned to TG 58.2. Five days later, North Carolina shot down three kamikazes. In the furious anti-aircraft barrage, another ship accidentally hit North Carolina with a 5-inch shell, killing three and wounding forty-four. On 7 April, the Japanese launched a major air–naval counterattack on the landing centered on the battleship Yamato, which was largely defeated by the carriers, though North Carolina shot down one Japanese bomber. Another major kamikaze attack struck the fleet on 11 April. She shot down two more on 17 April, and two days later she was sent to support infantry attacks on Okinawa before departing for another overhaul at Pearl Harbor.

North Carolina returned to the fleet in Leyte Gulf in late June before it embarked on another series of attacks on Japan on 1 July. By this time, the fast carrier task force had been transferred to Third Fleet, so the battleship joined TG 38.3. The air attacks began on 10 July, with over a thousand aircraft hitting airfields around Tokyo. The strikes continued for more than a week, until a typhoon approached and forced the fleet to withdraw to avoid it on 19 July. During these operations, one of her Kingfishers picked up a downed pilot in Tokyo Bay under heavy fire. Following the Japanese surrender on 15 August, North Carolina contributed men for the initial occupation force and entered Sagami Bay on 27 August with the rest of the fleet. She thereafter patrolled the coast until 5 September, when she steamed into Tokyo Bay to reembark the men. The next day, she was assigned to TF 11 along with the three New Mexico-class battleships, a pair of light carriers, and a squadron of destroyers to return to the United States. From there, she sailed south to Okinawa to take on men bound for home as part of Operation Magic Carpet. The ship suffered a total of 10 crew dead and 67 wounded during her wartime service. The ship received 15 battle stars during her wartime service, the most of any battleship in the US fleet and placing her among the most decorated US Naval vessels of World War II.

She transited the Panama Canal on 8 October and arrived in Boston on 17 October. Subsequently she underwent an overhaul in the Brooklyn Navy Yard and thereafter conducted training operations off the east coast, including a training cruise for midshipmen from the US Naval Academy in the Caribbean in mid-1946. North Carolina was the only American treaty battleship to see any significant service after the end of the war.

=== Decommissioning ===
The ship was decommissioned on 27 June 1947 in New York and placed in reserve. While she was out of service, the Navy considered several plans to modernize or convert the ship for other purposes. The first series of studies in 1954 revolved around improving the ship's speed to 31 knots (57 km/h; 36 mph), which would require a significant reduction in displacement and a much more powerful propulsion system. The displacement issue could be solved by the removal of the rear turret, but there was not enough room in the hull to place a power plant necessary to reach the desired speed. The Navy also evaluated a proposal to convert North Carolina into a helicopter carrier; the plan would have involved removing all of her main and secondary guns (though the forward turret would be retained to keep the ship balanced properly) in exchange for a flight deck and facilities for twenty-eight helicopters and a battery of sixteen 3-inch (76 mm) guns. The Navy ultimately decided that a new, purpose-built helicopter carrier would be cheaper and so the project was abandoned.

She remained in the Navy's inventory until she was stricken from the Naval Vessel Register on 1 June 1960, slated to be broken up for scrap. A North Carolina man, James Craig, founded a campaign to save the vessel modeled on the Battleship Texas Commission that had successfully acquired the old battleship Texas for preservation as a museum ship. He convinced Governor Luther H. Hodges to ask the Navy to delay the scrapping of the ship, and then led a campaign to raise the $250,000 necessary to prepare a site to host the vessel, to tow her there, and work to prepare her for visitors. With the help of the WRAL TV station—which broadcast a "Save Our Ship" advertisement campaign—and numerous state newspapers, Craig was able to secure more than $330,000 for the project. Next were considerations of the site to be used; three cities were considered: Southport, Morehead City, and Wilmington. The latter was selected, since it was further inland and thus more protected from hurricanes.

== Memorial and museum ==
- USS North Carolina (Battleship)
- U.S. National Register of Historic Places
- U.S. National Historic Landmark
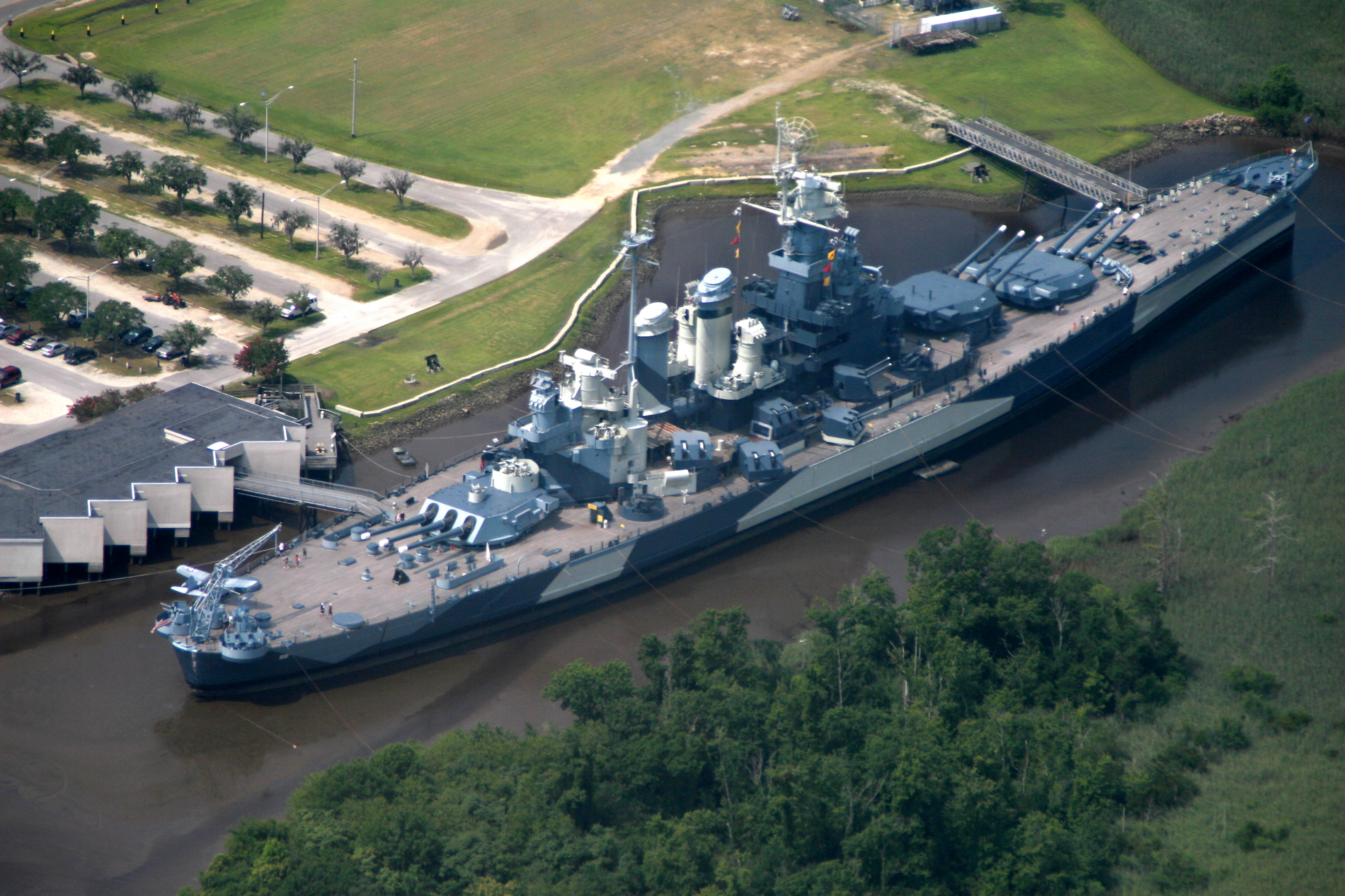
- USS North Carolina Battleship Memorial
- Location: Wilmington, North Carolina
- Coordinates: 34°14′11″N 77°57′15″W
- Built: 1941
- Architect: Brooklyn Navy Yard
- NRHP reference No.: 82004893

Significant dates
- Added to NRHP: 10 November 1982
- Designated NHL: 14 January 1986

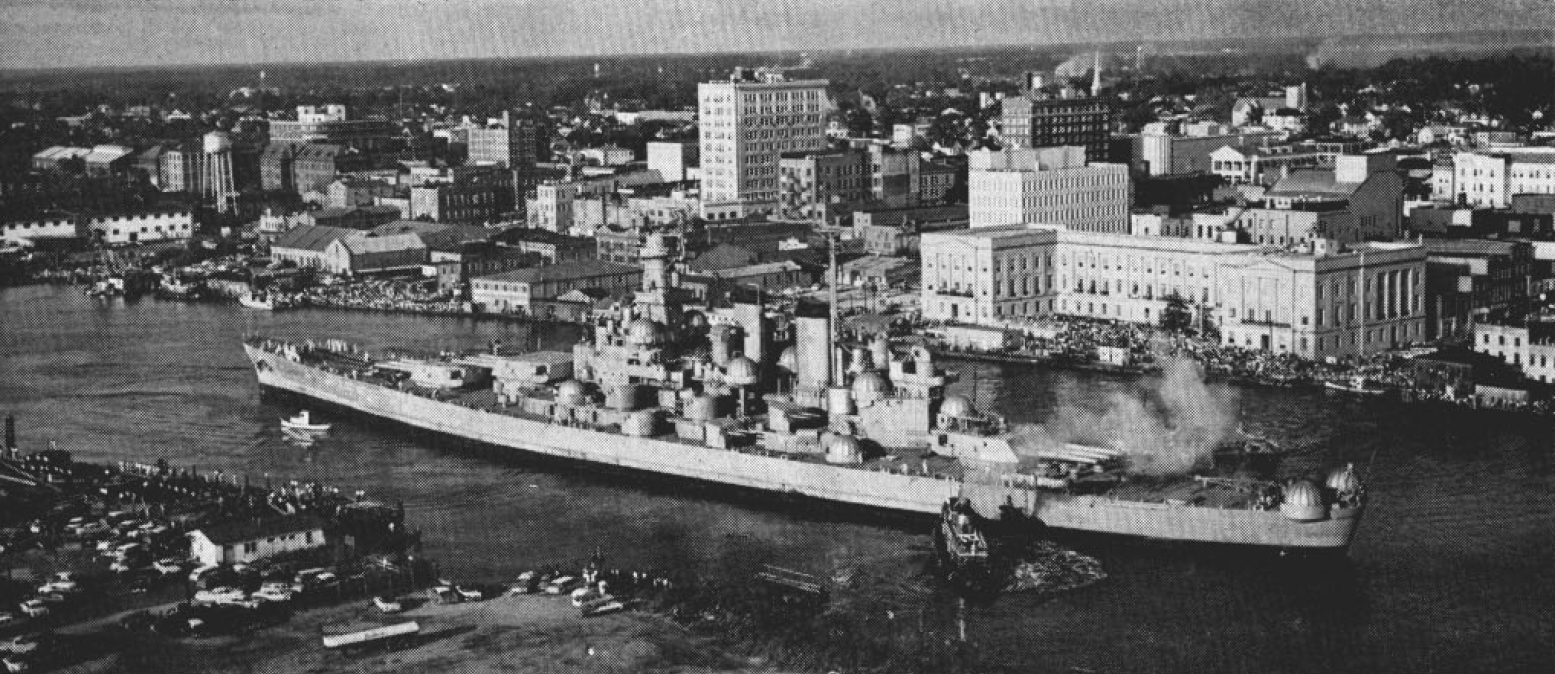
North Carolina being towed to Wilmington in 1961

On 6 September 1961, North Carolina was transferred to the state. The ship was towed out of Bayonne, New Jersey, bound for Wilmington, by a group of nine tugboats on 25 September. At one point during the trip, on 2 October, the tugs lost control of the ship in the Cape Fear River and she collided with a floating seafood restaurant, though surprisingly causing only minor damage. After her berth – located across the Cape Fear River from downtown Wilmington, about 28 miles (45 km) from the river's confluence with the Atlantic Ocean — was completed and repairs to the ship effected, she was formally opened on 29 April 1962 as a memorial to more than 11,000 North Carolinians who died while serving in the United States armed forces during World War II.

In 1964, a Kingfisher that had crashed in British Columbia, Canada, during the war and then subsequently been salvaged was donated to the museum.

In the early 1980s, when the Navy reactivated the four Iowa-class battleships, parts were cannibalized from North Carolina and the other preserved battleships, including Alabama and Massachusetts, to restore the Iowas to service. Engine room components that were no longer available in the Navy's inventory accounted for most of the material removed from the ships. The battleship was declared a National Historic Landmark on 10 November 1982; the application noted that the ship was in almost excellent condition and remained in its wartime configuration.

Work to maintain the ship and improve the facility is an on-going effort. In 1998, the museum's operators ran Operation Ship Shape, a donation drive to secure funds to make repairs to the vessel, including the ship's teak deck, which was replaced with teak from Myanmar. Funds from the campaign were also allocated to repair the ship's hull, which by the early 2000s had deteriorated significantly; in some places, corrosion had reduced the thickness of the hull plating from its original 0.625-to-0.75-inch (15.9 to 19.1 mm) thickness to as thin as 0.15 inches (3.8 mm). After considering moving the ship to a drydock for the work, which would have been prohibitively expensive, the ship's caretakers decided to use the same method used to refurbish the battleship Alabama: erect a cofferdam around the hull and pump it dry. In addition to replacing damaged hull plates, the hull also received a new coat of paint to better protect it from the elements. In 2018, a walkway was erected around the ship to allow visitors to view the ship from all sides, with funding provided by the SECU Foundation. The walkway sits atop the cofferdam necessary for the ship's repairs. Repairs to the ship's hull were completed in 2021.

As of the beginning of 2024, the memorial and museum is one of North Carolina's most-visited tourist sites. In 2022, the museum had nearly 250,000 visitors and enjoyed the most financially successful year in its history.

During the early 21st century, flooding due to a climate change-related rise in sea level became an increasing problem at the museum site. A National Oceanic and Atmospheric Administration tidal gauge 0.5-mile (0.8 km) from the museum recorded a 9-inch (23 cm) rise in sea level between its installation in 1935 and 2023, and the museum's leaders documented a 7,000 percent increase in flooding incidents between 1961 and 2023, with 20 flooding incidents at the site during 2011. After 2013, flooding problems accelerated dramatically: In 2020, the site experienced flooding during about half of the year, and flooding continued to accelerate after that, with 200 days of flooding during 2022. By the beginning of 2024, waters from the Cape Fear River routinely overtopped seawalls, flooding hundreds of spaces in the museum's parking lot as well as sidewalks and grassy areas, killing oak trees on the property, and occasionally forcing the museum to close when its only access road became submerged.

To increase drainage, improve both water quality, and enhance safety of visitors, the museum's leaders decided to embark on a US$4.1 million construction project – expected to last from January to September 2024 – which would allow the museum to accommodate the changing landscape rather than attempt to prevent the intrusion of water. Plans called for the removal of about 800 feet (244 m) of concrete and rock barriers and their replacement with a "living shoreline" of earthen berms and native vegetation that would reduce erosion and attract a variety of animals including shrimp and blue crabs; the removal of several acres of the parking lot prone to flooding and restoring the tidal creek and wetland that existed there before 1961, to hold back water and redirect it into the river; raising the remaining portion of the parking lot above the high tide level; and planting 100 trees and shrubs in the parking lot and 130,000 native marsh plants to filter storm water runoff and create a habitat for migratory and nesting birds. The project will be funded with nearly US$2 million from United States Government and North Carolina state grants, more than US$1 million from the North Carolina state budget, and funding from the North Carolina Department of Natural and Cultural Resources.

With sea level rise at the site expected to increase by about 1 foot (0.3 m) between 2024 and 2050, the 2024 construction project is expected to address drainage problems until sometime between 2039 and 2044, when additional measures may become necessary to address flooding. The 2024 project is designed to accommodate additional changes that probably will be required in the mid-21st century.
