= Latino Community Credit Union =

Credit union in the US

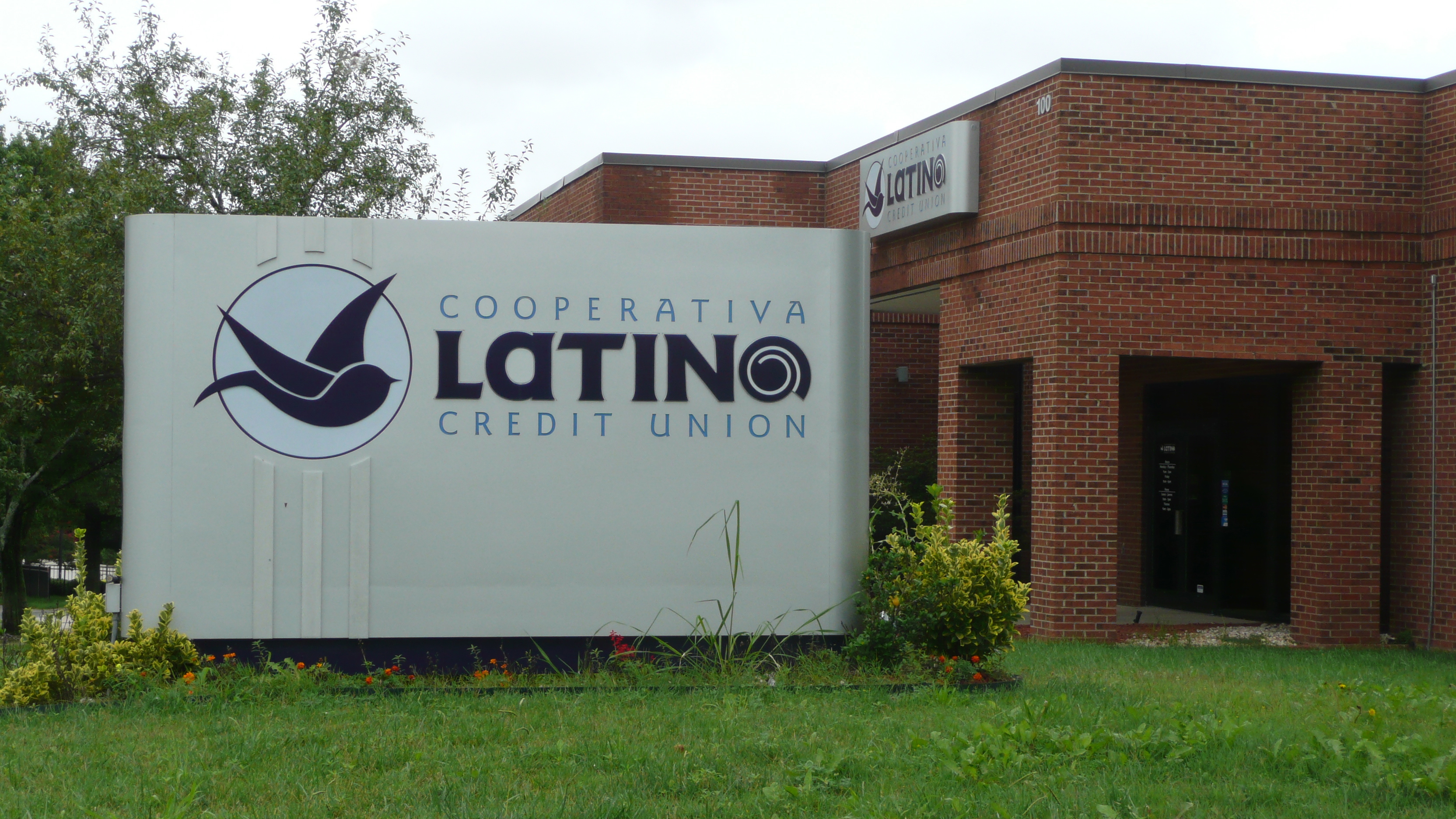
- Type: Credit union
- Industry: Financial services
- Founded: July 1, 2000; 26 years ago
- Headquarters: Durham, North Carolina
- Area served: North Carolina
- Products: Savings; checking; consumer loans; mortgages; credit cards; investments; online banking
- Total assets: ▲$720M USD (December 2021)
- Website: Latinoccu.org

The Latino Community Credit Union (LCCU) is located in Durham, North Carolina. The LCCU was established in 2000 in Downtown Durham, North Carolina. It became the first Latino credit union in North Carolina and is currently the only Latino Credit Union in the state. Today, it has over 90,000 members and 15 locations across North Carolina.

== History ==
The LCCU arose in response to a Latino exclusion from local banking services due to illiteracy, lack of documentation, and language barriers, as well as response to the increasing violence in Durham against these communities.

=== Latinos in Durham during the 1990s ===
Durham’s Latino immigrant community experienced issues regarding violence and theft in the 1990s. According to John Herrera, vice president for Latino affairs at the Durham-based Self-Help Credit union, “in 1996, [Durham] experienced an outbreak of violence in the community– home invasions, attacks, and robberies– due to the lack of access to financial institutions”. Latinos paid everything with cash; from rent to car payments. Latinos became victims and “easy targets” for violent crimes, making them vulnerable to the ongoing violence that took place in Durham. Additionally, the cash culture among Latino immigrants resulted in a lack of credit history because individuals could not report any activity to credit agencies. Without a credit history, Latinos and Hispanics could not build a foundation for borrowing funds to purchase homes, cars, or establish new businesses. Understanding and trusting banks in the United States became a huge barrier for many Latino and Hispanic immigrants. To overcome this barrier, educating communities became crucial to the success of this community.

=== Founding ===
Leaders of the Triangle’s Hispanic community came together to resolve the situation among Latinos in Durham. Ivan Parra, Executive Director of El Centro Hispano in Durham, and John Herrera led the initiative to establish a credit union for Hispanics and Latinos; both community members that had extensive involvement in community engagement and groups before. Organizations and groups from a diverse range of sectors came together to share resources in an attempt to create a successful credit union that would give opportunities to the largest minority group in Durham. These groups included immigrant support groups, the North Carolina State Employees’ Credit Union, marketing partners, and other local foundations. Start-up deposits from these groups totaled around $2.5 million, resulting in a strong financial footing that led to considerable future success.

=== Establishment ===
In 2000, the LCCU established itself at El Centro Hispano on Chapel Hill Road in Durham. El Centro Hispano is a local non-profit organization founded in 1992, whose mission has been to “strengthen the [Hispanic] community [in Durham], build bridges, and advocate for equity and inclusion” by providing a variety of services to the community. When the credit union opened members of the center automatically enrolled into the credit union, and anyone who joined the credit union would also belong to the center. This membership drive aimed to have at least 5,000 members enrolled in both institutions, hoping to aid the Hispanic community with as many resources as possible in an accessible manner. The credit union started by offering free cash-checking services, savings accounts, loans, and money wiring services.

== Community support programs ==
In 2002, the LCCU sponsored the creation of the Latino Community Development Center, or LCDC. This organization “promotes financial literacy, access to financial services, and economic development for the low income immigrant Latino population in North Carolina.”

By 2010, the LCCU offered a financial education program, Building a Better Future, consisting of six workshops that teach financial literacy to members of the credit union. Over 180 participants graduated from the program within the first few years of its establishment.

In 2016, the LCCU established a scholarship program with the goal of increasing access to higher education among its members. Scholarship recipients are supported to launch their professional careers in a variety of areas, aimed to “empower its members to achieve their dreams and give back to their community”.

== Assets ==
In 2003, the LCCU held $11 million in assets and had 8,000 members. By 2013, the LCCU had over 55,000 members, $125 million in assets, and $227 million in financing. Of the people it served, 95% came from low-income backgrounds, 75% had never opened a bank account, and 2,000 became first-time homeowners. As of December 2021, the credit union had over $720 million in assets, $1.3 billion in local financing, and its scholarship program awarded over $455,000 since its start.

== Branches ==
The LCCU grew substantially by 2010, opening new branches in Winston-Salem, Charlotte, Garner, Carrboro, and Monroe. As of April 2022, the LCCU had a total of 15 branches across North Carolina. The credit union serves over 90,000 members.

Branches
Region	Locations
Triangle Region	Downtown Durham; Durham North Roxboro; Raleigh; Carrboro; Garner; Fayetteville
Charlotte Region	Charlotte Meridian; Charlotte University City Boulevard; Monroe; Charlotte South Boulevard; Charlotte Milton Road
Triad Region	High Point; Greensboro W Market; Winston Salem; Greensboro
