= SECU Stadium =

Home stadium of the Maryland Terrapins. College Park, Maryland

- The Shell
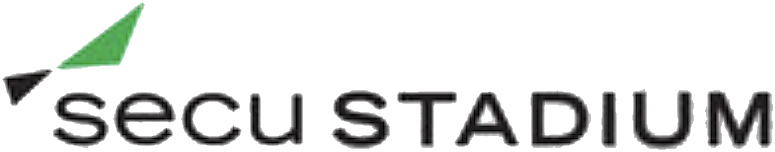

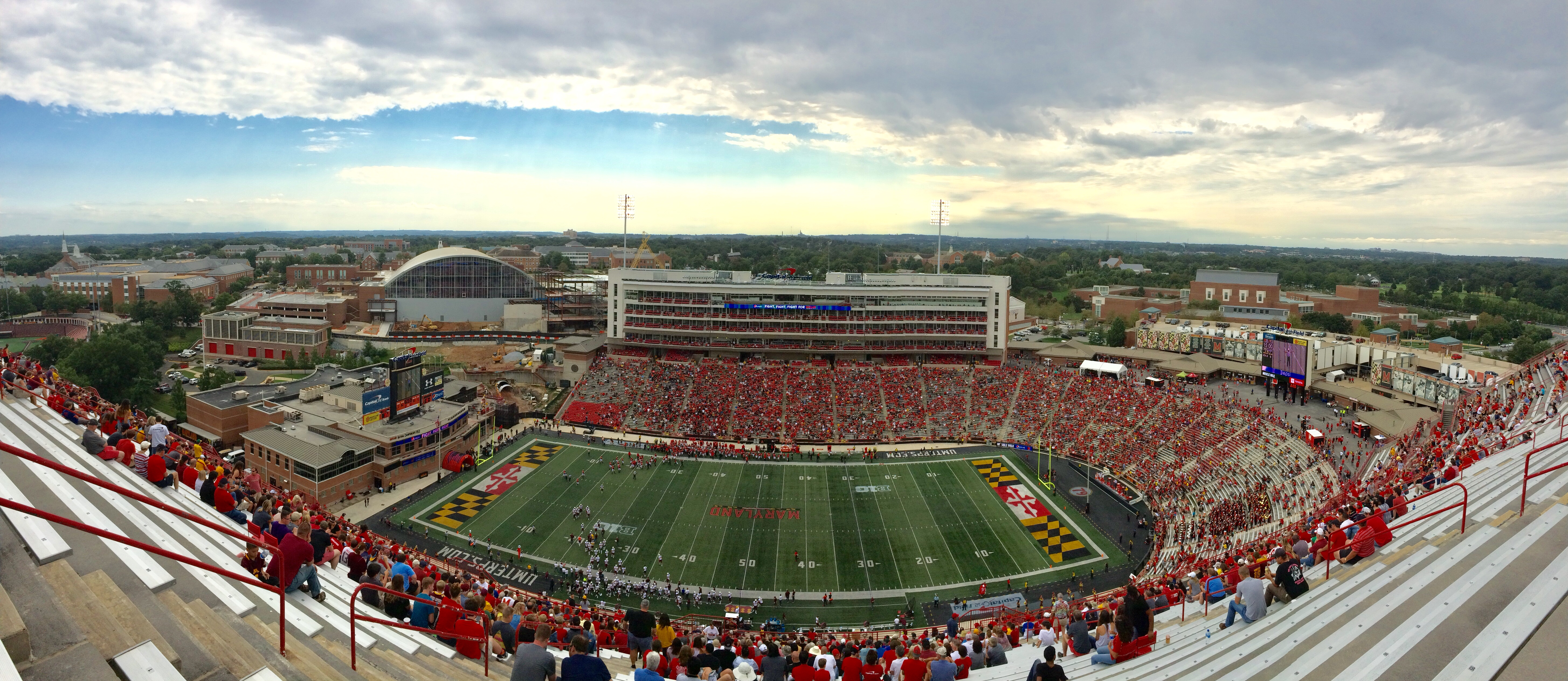
- Then-Maryland Stadium during a game on September 22, 2018

- Location within Maryland Location within the United States
- Interactive map of SECU Stadium
- Former names: List: Byrd Stadium (1950–2006); Chevy Chase Bank Field at Byrd Stadium (2006–2009); Capital One Field at Byrd Stadium (2009–2015); Capital One Field at Maryland Stadium (2015–2022)
- Address: 90 Stadium Drive; College Park, Maryland; U.S. 20742
- Coordinates: 38°59′25″N 76°56′50″W
- Owner: University of Maryland, College Park
- Operator: University of Maryland, College Park
- Capacity: 46,185 (2025–present) Former capacity List: 51,802 (2012–2024); 54,000 (2009–2011); 51,500 (2002–2008); 48,055 (1995–2001); 45,000 (1976–1994); 34,680 (1950–1975)
- Surface: FieldTurf (2012–present); Grass (1950–2012)
- Record attendance: 58,973 (1975 vs. Penn State)

Construction
- Groundbreaking: January 1949
- Opened: September 30, 1950
- Expanded: 1995, 2002, 2008
- Cost: US$1 million ($13.4 million in 2025 dollars)
- Architects: James R. Edmunds Jr. Populous (renovations)
- General contractors: Baltimore Contractors, Inc.

Tenants
- Maryland Terrapins (NCAA) 1950–present Baltimore Stars (USFL) 1985; Presidential Cup Bowl (NCAA) 1950

Website
- umterps.com/secu-stadium

SECU Stadium is an outdoor athletic stadium on the campus of the University of Maryland in College Park, Maryland, United States. It is the home of Maryland Terrapins football and men's lacrosse teams, which compete in the Big Ten Conference. The facility was formerly named Byrd Stadium after Harry "Curley" Byrd, a multi-sport athlete, football coach, and university president in the first half of the 20th century, and temporarily Maryland Stadium after objections to Byrd's naming due to his history of supporting segregation.

== History ==
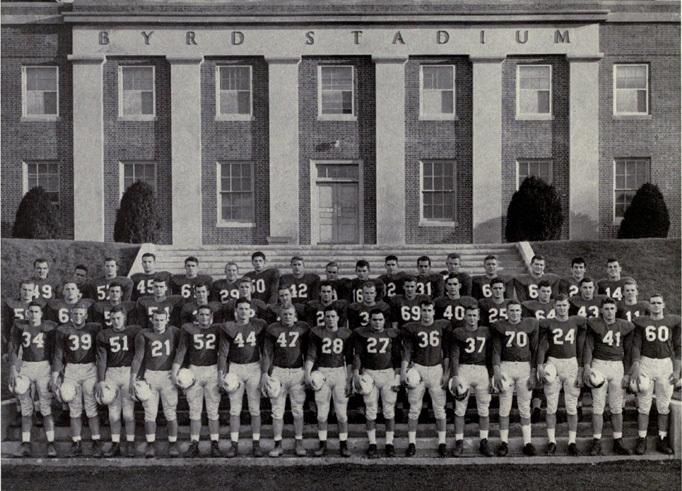
Maryland team posing in front of the stadium in 1951

SECU Stadium opened on September 30, 1950, as Byrd Stadium after construction at a cost of $1 million, replacing the much smaller Old Byrd Stadium on the site currently used for the university's Fraternity Row east of Baltimore Avenue. For 26 seasons, Maryland Stadium consisted of a horseshoe-shaped bowl with capacity of 34,680.

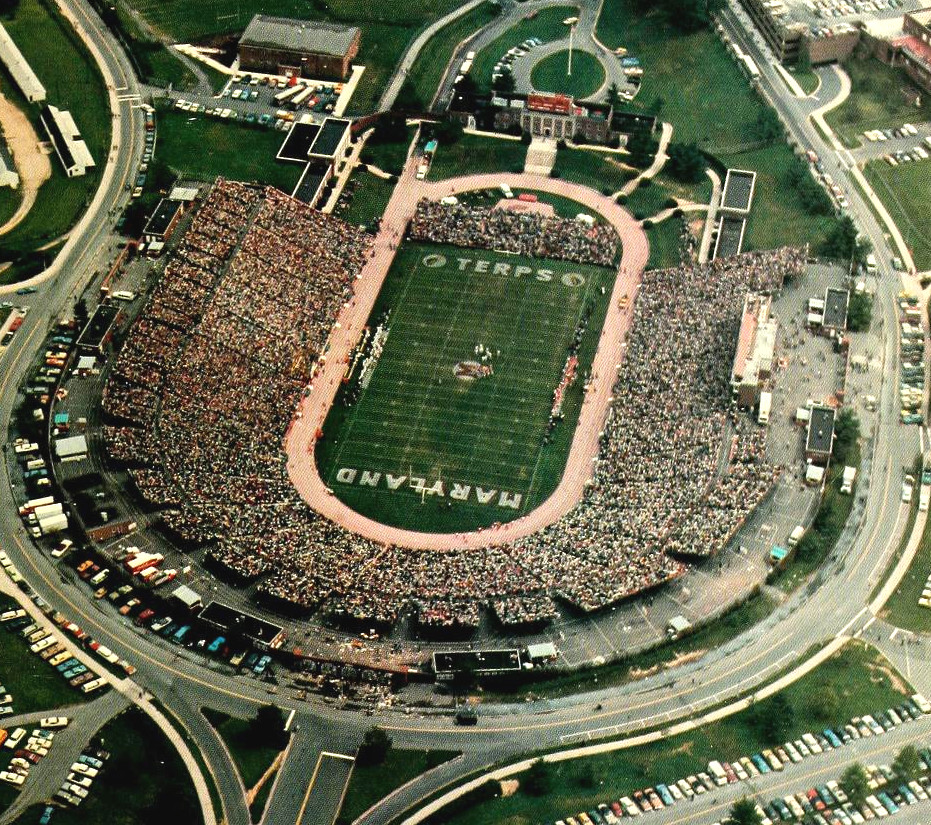
An aerial 1975 photo of then-Byrd Stadium

Permanent lights were installed in 1985.

In 1991, the stadium added the five-story Tyser Tower on its south side, featuring luxury suites and an expanded press area. That same year, the university opened the Gossett Football Team House adjacent to the east endzone.

In 1995, the stadium's capacity increased to 48,055 through the addition of a 12,000-seat upper deck on the north side of the stadium. In 2001, during the Terrapins' ACC championship run, bleachers were installed to add an additional 3,000 seats. In 2002, a full-color video scoreboard was added in the east endzone, and the Gossett Football Team House started an expansion project.

Between 2007 and 2009, the stadium underwent a $50.8 million expansion, increasing overall capacity, adding skyboxes and lowering the field to improve spectators' sightlines. The project rebuilt Tyser Tower, adding 63 suites and mezzanine seating. The expansion increased the stadium capacity to 54,000. A second LED video board was installed on the west side of the stadium before the 2008 season. The university had also announced plans to extend the upper deck around the west endzone, adding another 8,000 seats, but the expansion project was completed without this construction.

The university installed a new artificial playing surface field in 2012, replacing its natural grass field used since the stadium's opening. The upgrade included a new technology known as "CoolPlay" that reportedly keeps the field cooler (up to 15 °F cooler) than traditional turf fields with rubber infill. It was the first installation of its kind in the United States.

In 2021, a larger videoboard was installed behind the west endzone. The screen was first used during a night game against Iowa on October 1, 2021.

SECU Stadium's attendance record is 58,973, set on November 1, 1975. The record was achieved with temporary seating for a game featuring the #14 Terps and #9 Penn State.

The lone version of the Presidential Cup college football bowl game was held here in December 1950. The USFL Baltimore Stars called the stadium home in 1985. SECU Stadium has also hosted the Division I NCAA Men's Lacrosse Championship ten times.

== Field naming rights ==
On August 24, 2006, the University of Maryland announced that it had agreed to a $20 million deal with Chevy Chase Bank to name the field Chevy Chase Bank Field, leaving the Byrd Stadium name intact. The revenue from the deal was used to pay for renovations and upgrades to the stadium.

After Chevy Chase Bank was acquired by Capital One in 2009, the field was renamed Capital One Field.

The bank branding is not displayed on the outside of the stadium, but since 2006 the full name including the branded field has been used in the university's marketing materials for the stadium.

On September 16, 2022, the university announced that the stadium would be renamed SECU Stadium as part of a 10-year deal between the credit union and the university. The deal is worth $11 million and includes $2.5 million that will go towards athletic facility improvements.

== Stadium name change ==
The stadium's original namesake was Harry C. "Curley" Byrd, a former Maryland football player who later taught English and History and served as athletic director before rising to university president, serving from 1935 until 1954. During his tenure, the campus grew significantly, and Byrd is credited with transforming UMD from "an undistinguished agricultural college to something resembling a modern university." However, in 2015, the Maryland Student Government Association passed resolution in support of removing Byrd's name from the stadium because of his prominent support of segregation during his tenure. That same year, then-university president Wallace Loh appointed a task force to consider the issue. Loh issued a recommendation to the University System of Maryland to change the name, and the Board of Regents voted 12–5 in December 2015 to rename the facility as "Maryland Stadium." On September 16, 2022, the university announced that the stadium would be renamed SECU Stadium as part of a 10-year deal between the credit union and the university.

== Gallery ==
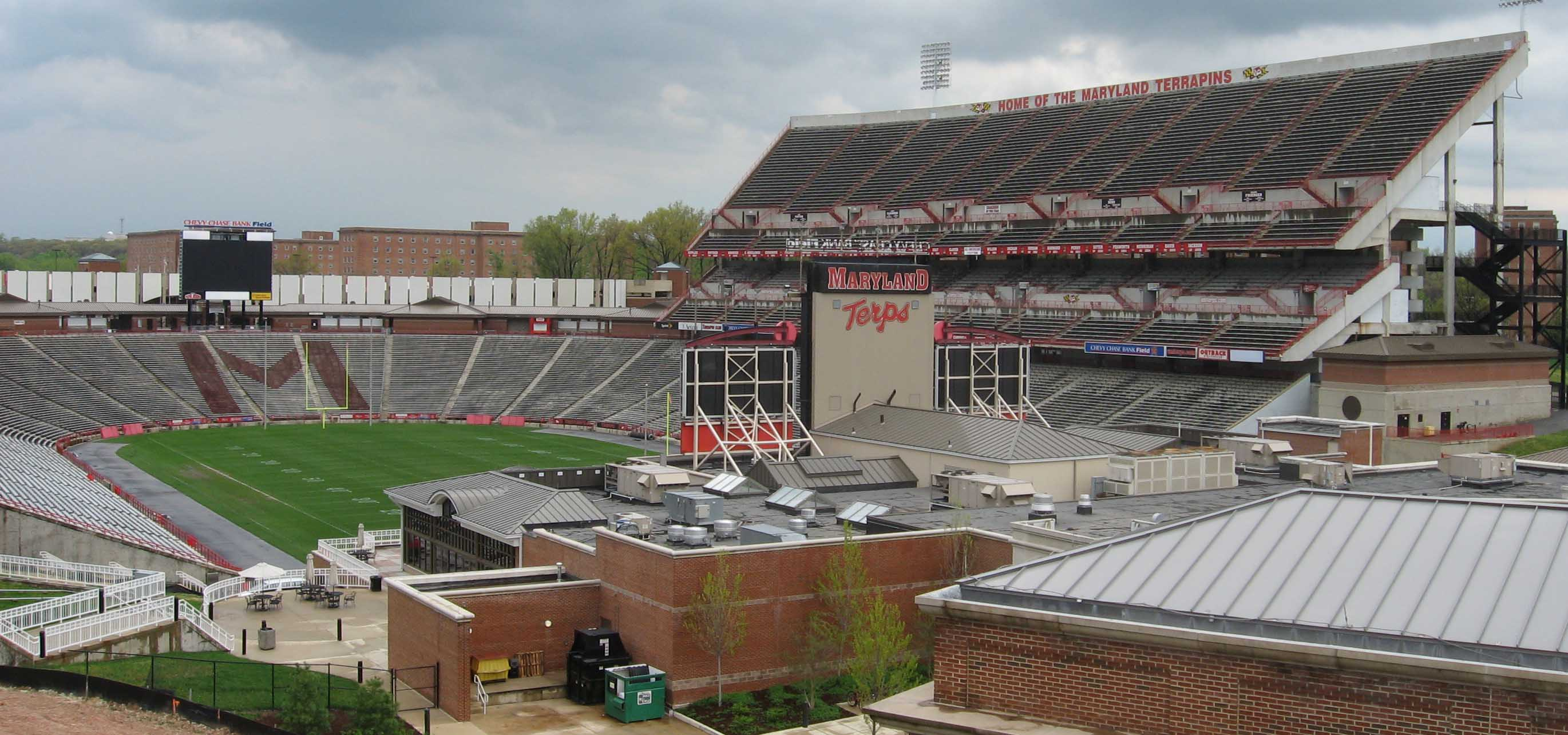
Interior view, 2008

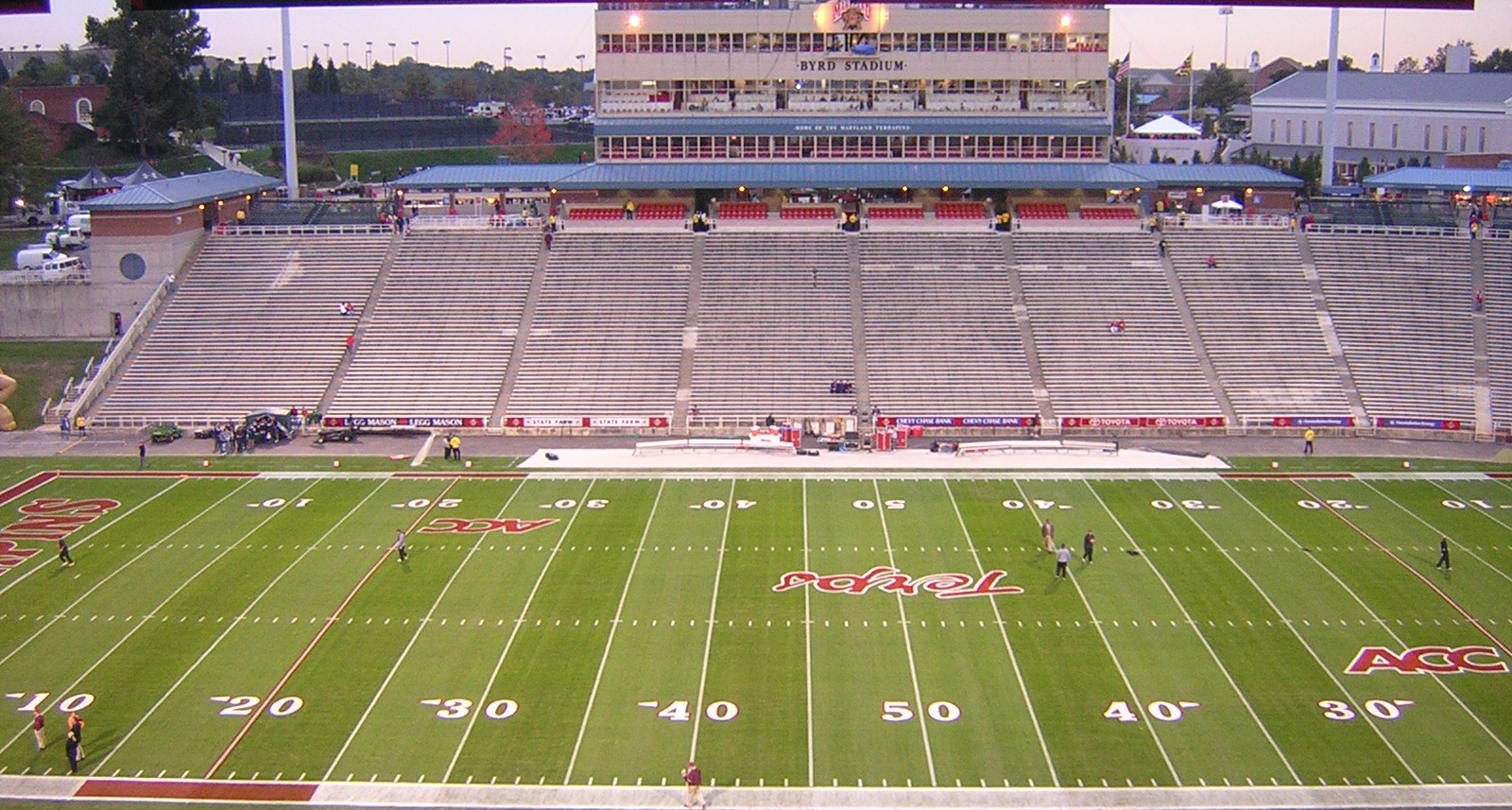
Lateral view, 2005

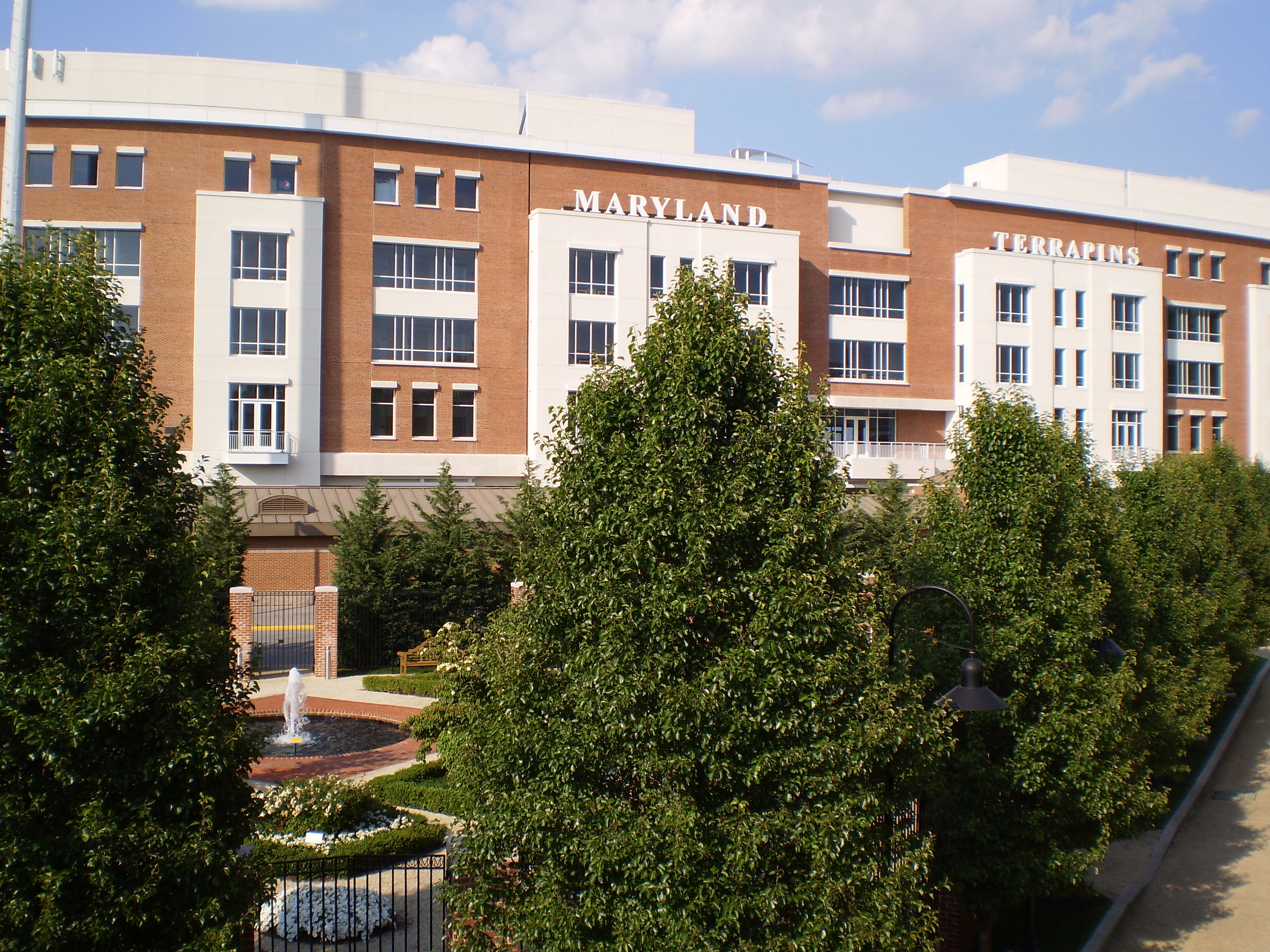
View of Tyser Tower

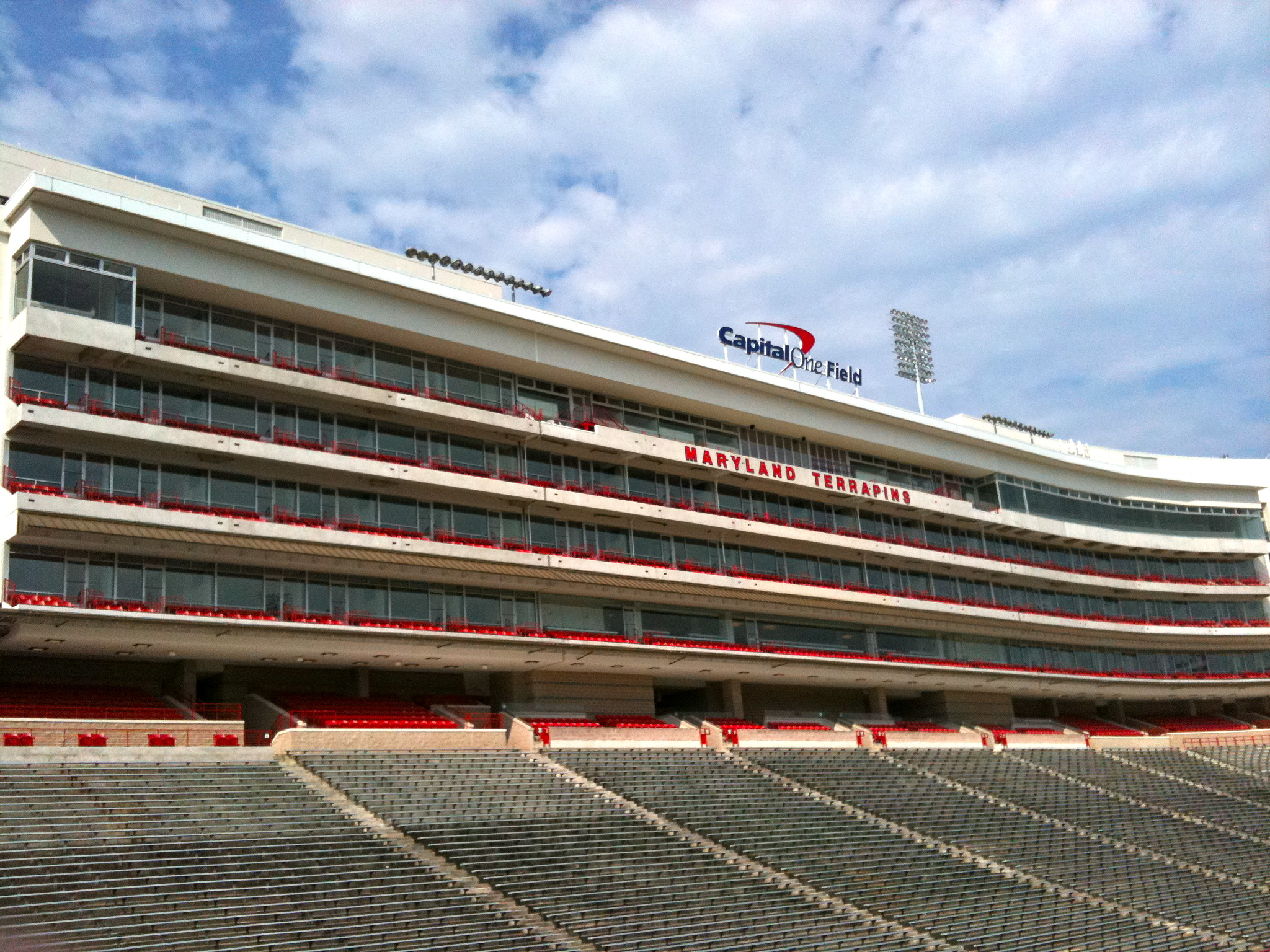
Tyser Tower contains 63 luxury suites (2010)

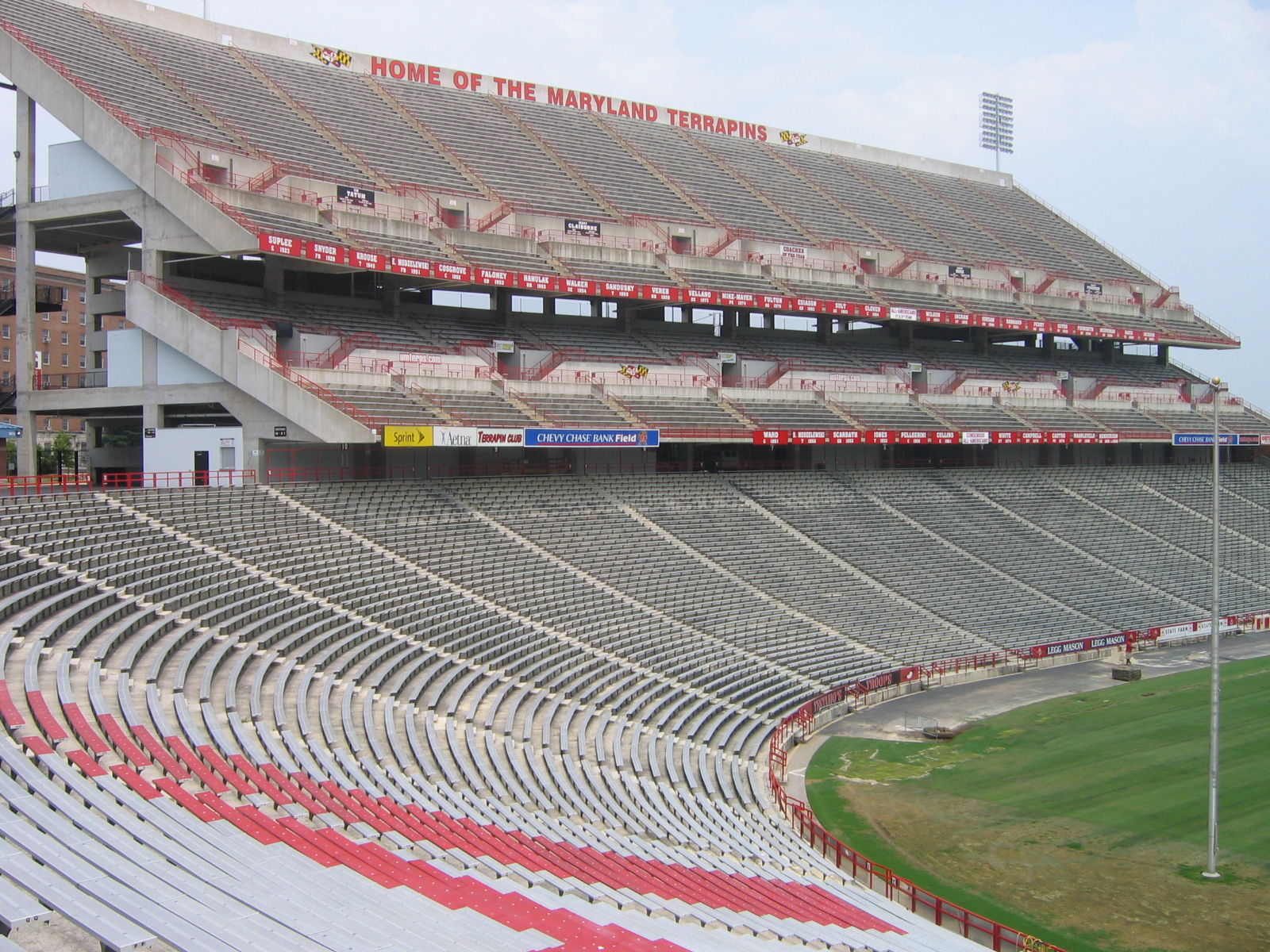
Goal grandstand

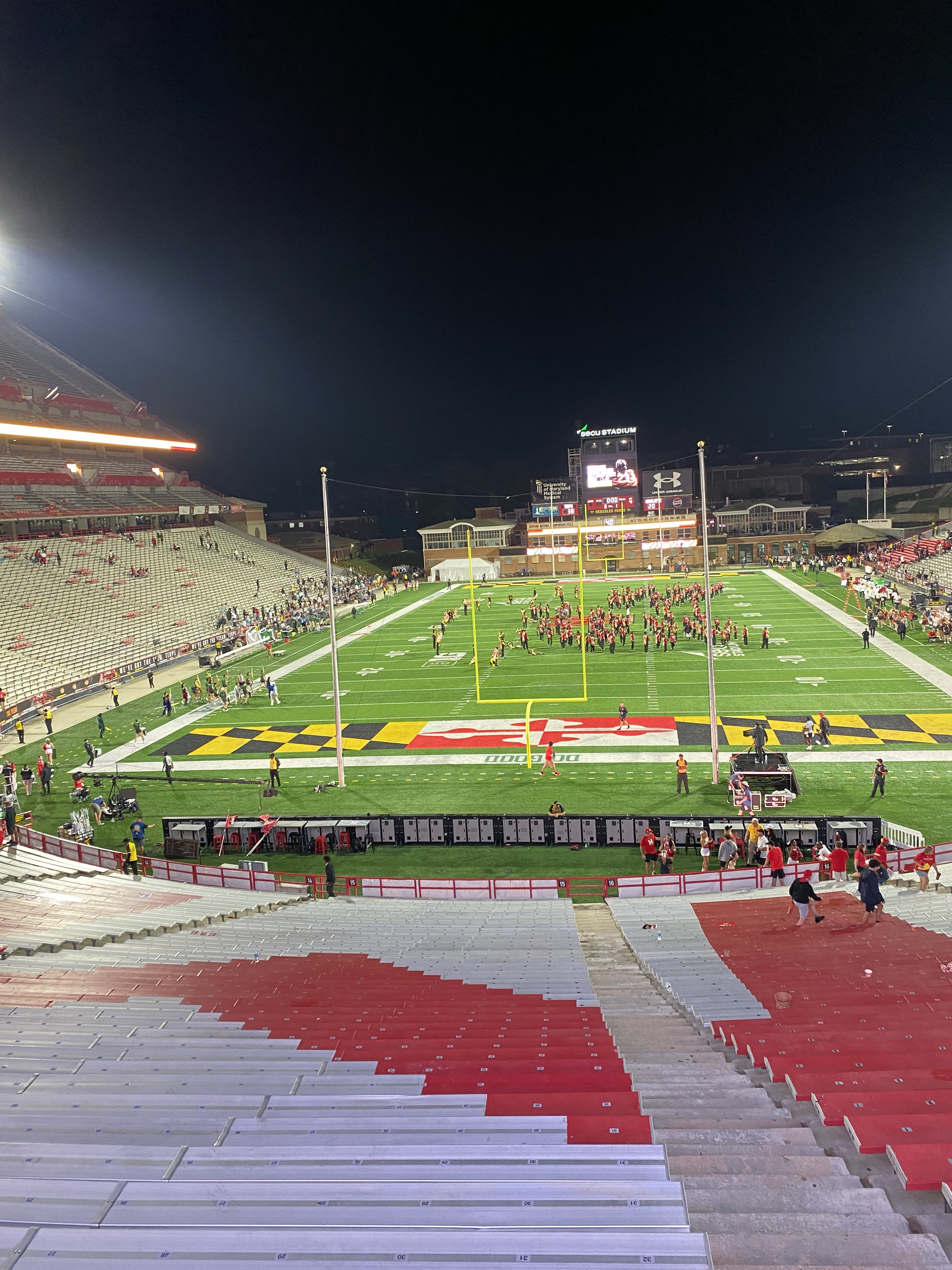
View of the lower bowl of SECU stadium at night (2023)

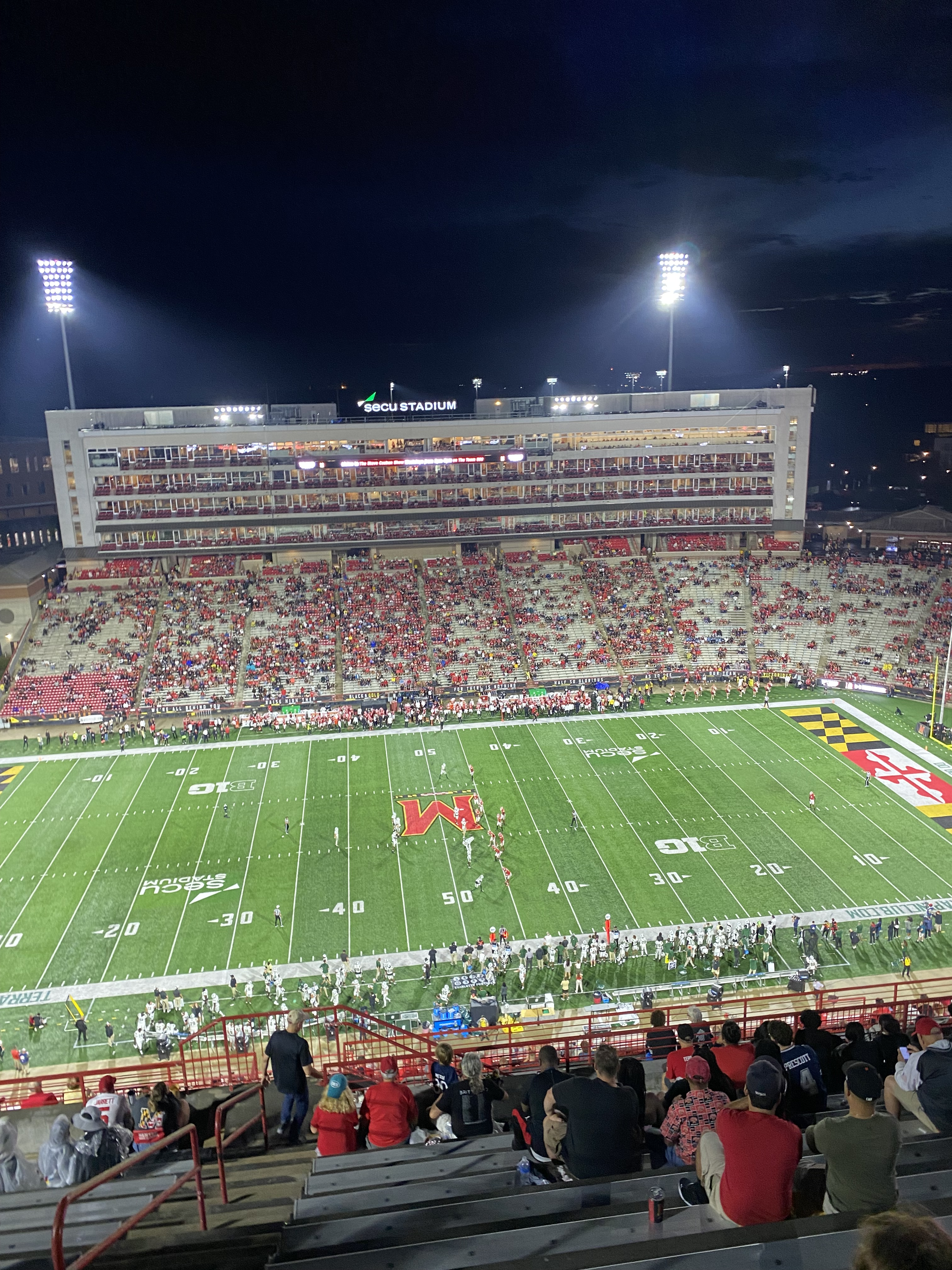
View from the upper deck of SECU stadium at night (2023)

== See also ==
- List of NCAA Division I FBS football stadiums

Events and tenants
Preceded by Camp Randall Stadium	Host of the Drum Corps International; World Championship; 2000	Succeeded by Ralph Wilson Stadium
Preceded by Hofstra Stadium	Home of the NCAA Lacrosse Final Four; 1972	Succeeded by Franklin Field
Preceded by Rutgers Stadium I	Home of the NCAA Lacrosse Final Four; 1979	Succeeded by Schoellkopf Field
Preceded by Carrier Dome	Home of the NCAA Lacrosse Final Four; 1989	Succeeded by Rutgers Stadium I
Preceded by Franklin Field	Home of the NCAA Lacrosse Final Four; 1993 – 1997	Succeeded by Rutgers Stadium
Preceded by Rutgers Stadium	Home of the NCAA Lacrosse Final Four; 1999 – 2000	Succeeded by Rutgers Stadium
