= SECU Arena =

Multi-purpose arena in Towson, Maryland, U.S.

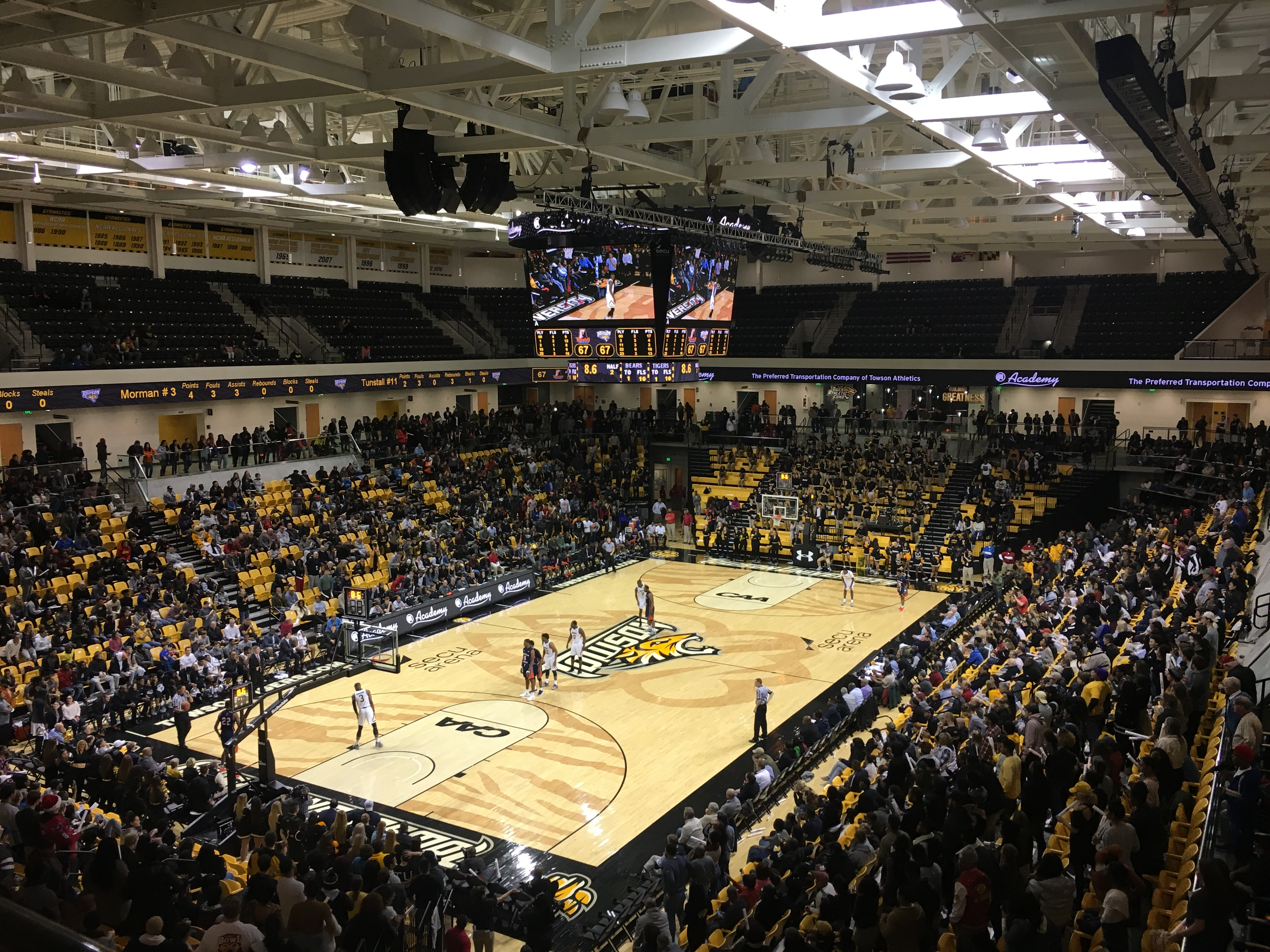
- Towson vs. Morgan State, December 2017

- Location within Maryland Location within the United States
- Interactive map of SECU Arena
- Former names: SECU Arena (October 2013–September 2023); TU Arena (October 2023–April 2025)
- Address: Auburn Drive; Towson, Maryland; US
- Coordinates: 39°23′14.5″N 76°37′1.5″W
- Owner: Towson University
- Operator: Towson University
- Capacity: 5,200; 3,580 (Baltimore Blast)
- Surface: Multi-surface

Construction
- Groundbreaking: May 10, 2011
- Opened: June 19, 2013
- Cost: $85 million
- Structural engineers: Faisant, Inc.
- Services engineer: James Posey Associates
- General contractor: Gilbane Building Company

Tenants
- Towson Tigers (CAA) 2013–present Men's and women's basketball, women's volleyball and gymnastics Baltimore Blast (MASL) 2017–present FC Baltimore 1729 (MASL2) 2025–present

Website
- www.towson.edu/campus/landmarks/arena/

SECU Arena (formerly TU Arena) is a 5,200-seat multi-purpose arena on the Towson University campus in Towson, Maryland, United States. The arena was completed and opened in 2013, and now hosts the men's and women's basketball teams, as well as the volleyball and gymnastics teams. It replaced the Towson Center, which had been in use since 1976. The arena has 340 club seats, four private suites and 96 courtside seats.

Before the arena opened, SECU secured the naming rights in a ten-year deal running through September 2023, after which the facility was known as TU Arena. In May 2025, SECU returned as naming rights sponsor with a seven-year deal.

In addition to being the home of several Towson sports teams, the arena also serves several other functions. It has been used as a concert arena for artists. Since opening, the arena has been host to an annual performance by the Harlem Globetrotters. Additionally, both the university and local Baltimore County high schools use the facility for their commencement ceremonies.

In 2017, the Baltimore Blast of the Major Arena Soccer League moved to the arena after 37 years at CFG Bank Arena.

== See also ==
- List of NCAA Division I basketball arenas
- State Employees Credit Union of Maryland (SECU Maryland, the current naming rights holder)
