= State Employees Credit Union =

Public employees' credit union in North Carolina

State Employees' Credit Union

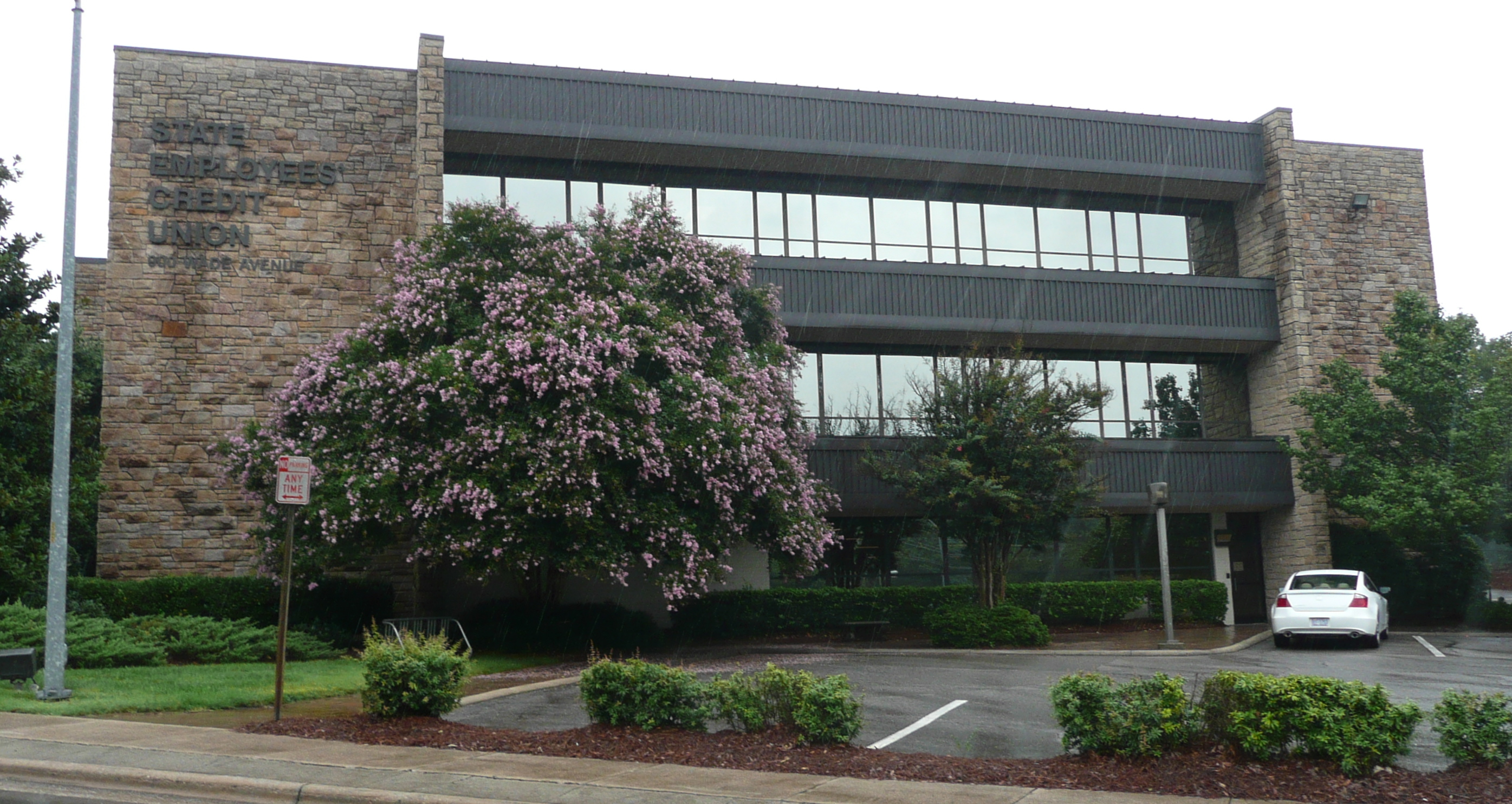
- State Employees Credit Union, Wade Ave., Raleigh, North Carolina
- Type: Credit union
- Industry: Financial services
- Founded: June 4, 1937; 89 years ago
- Headquarters: Raleigh, North Carolina, U.S.
- Key people: Leigh Brady (CEO)
- Products: Savings; checking; consumer loans; mortgages; credit cards; investments; online banking; insurance
- Total assets: ▲$59.7B USD (July 2026)
- Number of employees: 8,000
- Website: ncsecu.org

State Employees' Credit Union (SECU) is an American state-chartered credit union headquartered in Raleigh, North Carolina regulated under the authority of the Credit Union Division of the North Carolina Department of Commerce. SECU member deposits are insured by National Credit Union Administration (NCUA) of the U.S. federal government. SECU is the second largest natural member credit union in the United States, both in asset size and in membership. As of July 2026, SECU has $59.7 billion in assets, over 3 million members, and 275 branches with locations in all of North Carolina's 100 counties. SECU operates the no-fee CashPoints automated teller machine network, which is the largest ATM network in North Carolina. Membership in the credit union is primarily limited to employees of the state of North Carolina and their immediate family or the immediate family of current SECU members.

== History ==
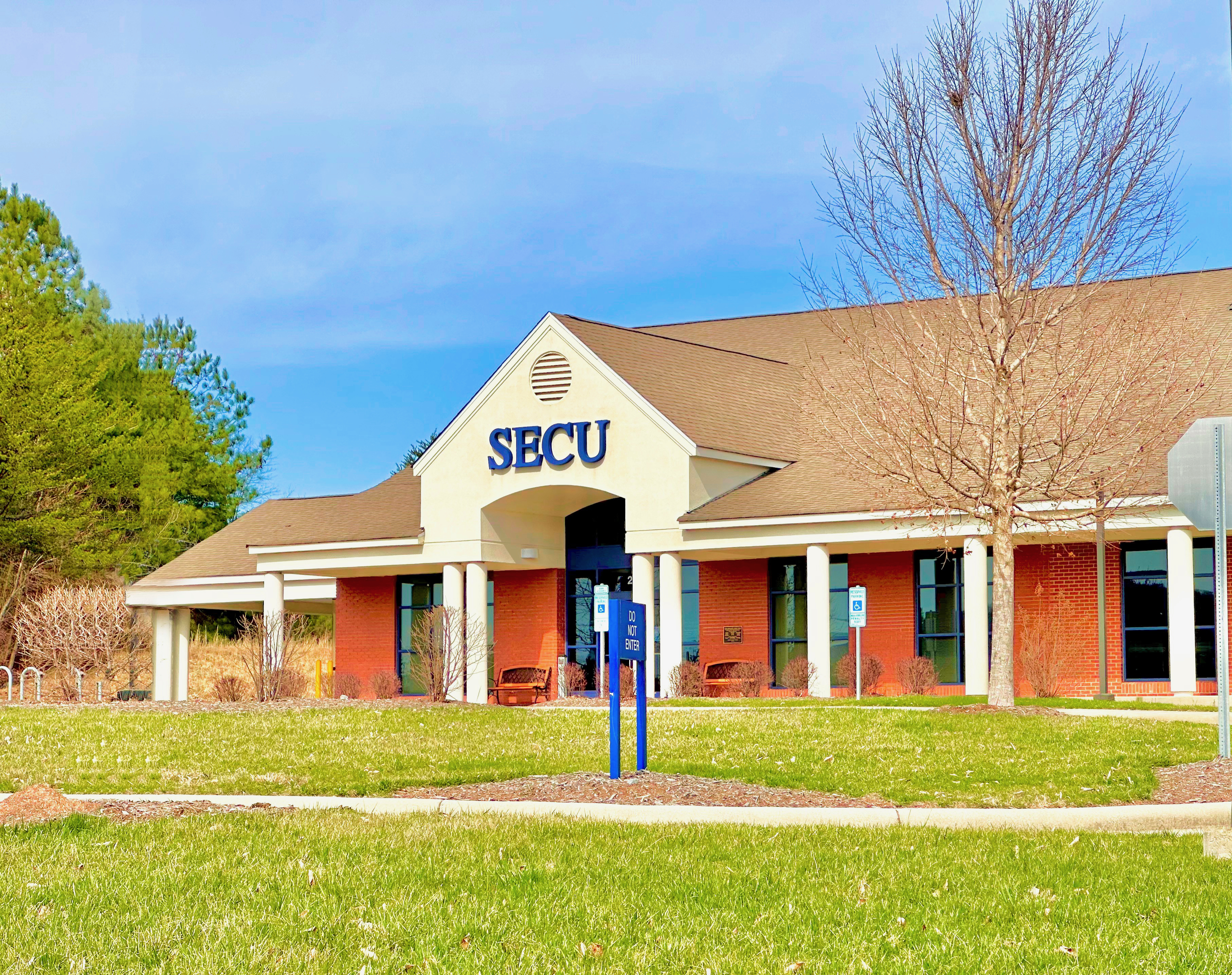
A State Employees' Credit Union branch in Hayesville, North Carolina

State Employees' Credit Union was originally incorporated on June 4, 1937 by employees of the State of North Carolina. The credit union began with $437 in assets and 17 members and was first operated from the basement of Raleigh's Agriculture Building. By 1960, the credit union grew to serve over 70,000 members and had assets of almost $25 million.

As of 2026, SECU has over $59.7 billion is assets and over 3 million members. It is the second largest credit union in the United States in terms of assets and membership. Total membership amounts to more than one-quarter of all North Carolinians.

== Shared Branches ==
A few otherwise independent credit unions have shared SECU's branches.

Civic Federal Credit Union serves employees of county, city, and other local government agencies in North Carolina. It operates largely as a virtual credit union (see Direct Bank). For about four decades, local employees had access to SECU's branch network, via an arrangement with Local Government Federal Credit Union (LGFCU). LGFCU eventually became the fourth largest credit union in North Carolina. However, LGFCU executives started Civic Credit Union as a lower-cost alternative to SECU's extensive branch network. The transition from Local Government Federal Credit Union to Civic Credit Union was completed in June of 2025.

The North Carolina Press Association Federal Credit Union (NCPAFCU) is open to employees and other persons associated with member newspapers of the North Carolina Press Association.

== Community support programs ==
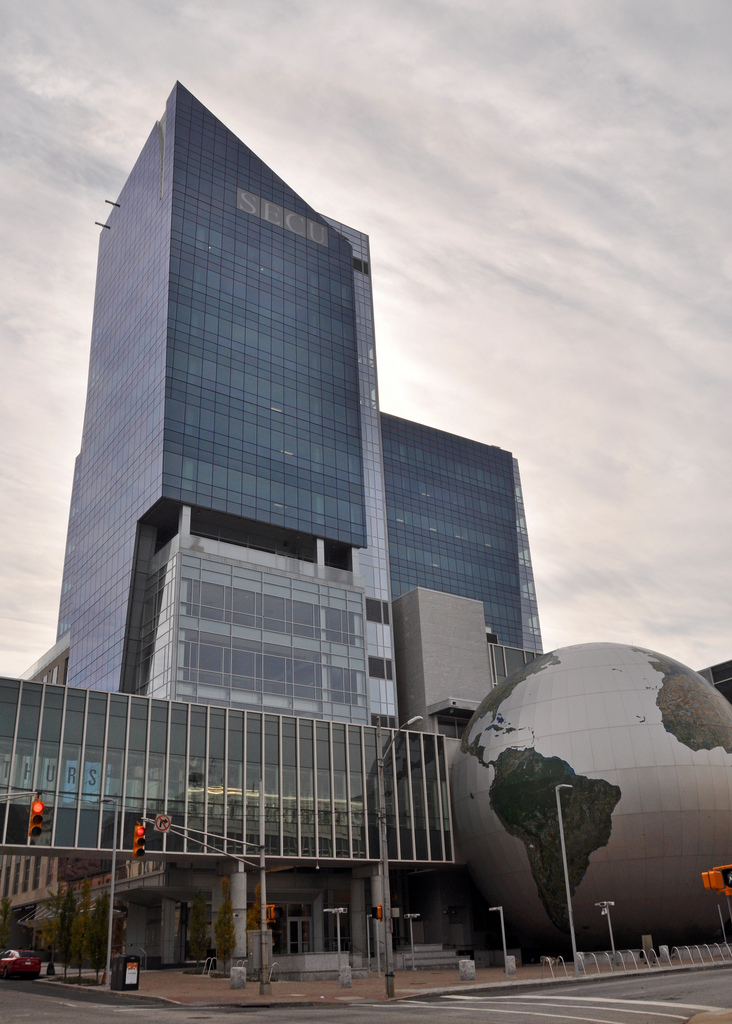
SECU building in downtown Raleigh, NC.

In 2004, SECU Foundation was formed by SECU to promote community development in North Carolina communities. The Foundation promotes local and community development by primarily funding high impact projects in the areas of housing, education, healthcare and human services. The State Employees’ Credit Union Board of Directors chartered the SECU Foundation to help identify and address community issues that are beyond the normal scope of State Employees’ Credit Union. Funding is provided by individual members that make the contribution, enforcing the core concept of State Employees’ Credit Union as a member-owned cooperative. Projects are funded by the SECU Foundation through “member-owners of SECU,” not by the Credit Union. Therefore, credit for the projects will rightfully be awarded to the SECU members making the contributions. SECU Foundation does not fund projects outside the state of North Carolina.

In 2009, SECU announced a $4 million grant to the North Carolina Museum of Natural Sciences for their planned Nature Research Center.

== See also ==
- Pennsylvania State Employees Credit Union
- S.C. State Credit Union
- State Employees Credit Union of Maryland
- State Employees Credit Union of New Mexico
- Washington State Employees Credit Union
