= State ECU =

Not-for-profit financial cooperative

State Employees Credit Union of New Mexico State ECU
- Type: Credit union
- Industry: Financial services
- Founded: 1958
- Headquarters: Santa Fe, New Mexico
- Number of locations: 7 (2025)
- Area served: New Mexico
- Key people: Andy Ramos (President & CEO)
- Products: Savings; checking; consumer loans; mortgages; credit cards; investments; online banking
- Revenue: ▲$35 million (2024)
- Total assets: ▲$1.25 billion (2024)
- Owners: Members
- Number of employees: 208
- Website: secunm.org stateecu.com

State ECU (also known as State Employees Credit Union of New Mexico or SECU New Mexico) is a state chartered, federally insured, not-for-profit credit union headquartered in Santa Fe, New Mexico. As of 2024, State ECU has $1,255,970,945 in assets, over 53,000 Members, and seven branches across New Mexico. Deposits by the Members are regulated and insured by National Credit Union Administration (NCUA) under latter's western region jurisdiction.

== History ==
State Employees Credit Union was formed in 1958 to serve employees of New Mexico and residents of Bernalillo, Doña Ana, Rio Arriba, Sandoval, Santa Fe, San Miguel, and Valencia counties. Over the decades, it expanded membership eligibility and services to include a broader range of individuals and businesses across the state.

In 2016, the credit union underwent a rebranding, shortening its name to State ECU and introducing a new logo to distinguish itself from other states employees credit unions.

In recent years, State ECU has expanded its branch network, introduced mobile and online banking enhancements, and offered financial products, including home equity lines of credit (HELOCs), auto loans, and small business services.

== Leadership ==
State ECU is governed by a volunteer Board of Directors and led by President/CEO Andy Ramos. The board oversees strategic direction, regulatory compliance, and member-focused initiatives.

== Community support programs ==
State ECU is actively involved in community service and financial literacy initiatives. Programs include:

- Cars for Kids – An annual fundraising event supporting Children’s Miracle Network and Connect Academy in New Mexico.
- Financial Literacy – Offers free resources on budgeting, credit building, and homeownership.
- Non-Profit Partnerships & Fundraising – The credit union has raised hundreds of thousands of dollars for local organizations, including Children’s Miracle Network, The Food Depot, Girls on the Run, and Big Brothers Big Sisters.

During the COVID-19 pandemic in New Mexico, State ECU established the State ECU Covid Relief Fund, which provided financial support to local businesses and nonprofits.

== Awards & Recognition ==
State ECU has been recognized for its contributions to financial services and community support. Recent accolades include:

- Bauer Financial – 5-Star Rating
- Newsweek – America’s Best Credit Unions
- CU Today – Top Performing Credit Union
- Albuquerque Business First – Best Places to Work
- Best of Santa Fe 2024 –
  - 1st Place: Best Mortgage Lender
  - 2nd Place: Best Financial Advisor
  - 2nd Place: Best Financial Institution
  - 2nd Place: Best Employer
  - 3rd Place: Best Business on St. Michael's Drive
- Rio Rancho Observer - Reader's Choice Winner (Mortgage Company, Financial Planner, and Credit Union)
- Valencia County News-Bulletin Best of Valencia County - Best Mortgage Lender
