= S.C. State Credit Union =

S.C. State Federal Credit Union
- Type: Credit union
- Industry: Financial services
- Founded: May 26, 1952
- Headquarters: Columbia, South Carolina
- Number of locations: 20 (2021)
- Area served: South Carolina
- Key people: Jim Kinard (President & CEO)
- Products: Savings; checking; consumer loans; mortgages; credit cards; investments; online banking
- Revenue: ▲
- Total assets: ▲$1.33 Billion (2024)
- Owners: members
- Number of employees: 270
- Website: scscu.com

State Credit Union, a federal credit union commonly known as "State Credit Union," is headquartered in Columbia, South Carolina. It is the sixth largest credit union in the state measured by asset size, according to National Credit Union Administration reports as of September 2010. State Credit Union serves over 100,000 members and has assets of over $1.33 billion as of December, 2024.

== History ==
State Credit Union originally was chartered as S.C. State Employees' Cooperative Credit Union on May 26, 1952. The first full-time staff member was employed in 1960. In 1975, the name was shortened to S.C. State Employees' Credit Union and the following year, the credit union moved into its own facility at 800 Huger Street. Over the years, the credit union expanded into new markets and currently operates 20 branches in 12 South Carolina cities.

== Membership ==
In addition to serving city, county and state employees who are enrolled in SC Retirement Systems, State Credit Union membership is open to other specified groups. These include:

- People who live, work or attend school in Aiken, Anderson, Florence, Greenwood, Oconee, Orangeburg, Pickens or Spartanburg County;
- Students, professors or staff members of any SC Technical college or any state-chartered college or university;
- Relatives (by blood or marriage) of existing members.
