= State Employees Credit Union of Maryland =

Public employees' credit union in Maryland

State Employees Credit Union of Maryland SECU Maryland SECU MD
- Type: Credit union
- Industry: Banking and Financial services
- Founded: October 1, 1951; 74 years ago
- Headquarters: Linthicum, Maryland, U.S.
- Number of locations: 55 branches, 109 ATMs (2020)
- Area served: Maryland
- Key people: Dave Sweiderk (President & CEO); Mark Reger (Chairman of the Board)
- Products: savings accounts; checking accounts; consumer loans; business loans; mortgages; credit cards; investments; and online banking;
- Revenue: ▲US$193 million (2019)
- Total assets: ▲US$4 billion (May 2020)
- Owners: members
- Number of employees: 586
- Subsidiaries: SECU Maryland Foundation
- Website: secumd.org/

State Employees Credit Union of Maryland (also known as SECU of Maryland or SECU Maryland or SECU MD) is a state-chartered credit union headquartered in Linthicum, Maryland. It is the largest federally-insured credit union in the state and is regulated under the authority of The Office of the Commissioner of Financial Regulation, State of Maryland.

== History ==
SECU Maryland began its operation in 1951 with then-Governor Theodore McKeldin as its first member. In the spring of 1953, it opened its first office. From 1959 to 1975, its operational head office moved within Baltimore multiple times. Finally, by 1979–80, SECU Maryland moved its headquarters to Towson. During the same period, it crossed the 50,000th membership enrollment mark. Currently, the new headquarters are located in Linthicum, Maryland.

As of June 2020, SECU Maryland has over $4 billion in assets and over 250,000 members. Its ATM distribution network spans over 55 branches and 54 remote locations across the state of Maryland. Member deposits are insured by the National Credit Union Administration (NCUA).

== Community support programs ==
In 2007, SECU Maryland created a foundation to support the educational goals of its members by providing scholarships. The scholarships are available to any SECU MD member who is pursuing higher education and meets the qualifications. Annual scholarships are generally awarded to 26 recipients enrolling for two or four years of college or university programs; including trade and technical schools.

In 2020, to overcome the on-going COVID-19 pandemic in Maryland, SECU Maryland Foundation created multiple grants and aid programs for local businesses and nonprofits as a part of COVID-19 community relief efforts.

=== Other programs ===
On June 19, 2013, SECU Maryland Foundation-sponsored TU Arena, named SECU Arena at the time, a 5,200-seat multi-purpose sports complex, was inaugurated on the Towson University campus. It eventually replaced Towson Center. It hosts the men's and women's basketball teams, as well as the respective volleyball and gymnastics teams. In October 2023, SECU's naming rights to the arena expired, and the arena was renamed to TU Arena. SECU returned as the arena's naming rights sponsor in 2025 under a seven-year deal.

On September 16, 2022, the University of Maryland announced that Maryland Stadium would be renamed SECU Stadium as part of a 10-year deal between the credit union and the university. The deal is worth $11 million and includes $2.5 million for athletic facility improvements.

== Compensation ==
Net profit for 2022 was more than $42 million, while total executive compensation surpassed $10 million. President & CEO Dave Sweiderk was compensated more than $1.4 million, while 6 other executives and highest-paid employees had total compensation packages in excess of $500,000 each. Salaries and wages for all other employees of the credit union totalled $23.9 million.
