= 2023–24 Coastal Athletic Association men's basketball season =

- League: NCAA Division I
- Sport: Basketball
- Duration: November, 2023 – March, 2024
- Teams: 14

Regular season
- Champion: Charleston
- Runners-up: Drexel
- Season MVP: Tyler Thomas (Hofstra)
- Top scorer: Tyler Thomas (Hofstra)

Tournament
- Champions: Charleston
- Runners-up: Stony Brook
- Finals MVP: Reyne Smith (Charleston)

CAA men's basketball seasons
- ← 2022–23 2024–25 →

2023–24 CAA men's basketball standings
	Conf.				Overall
Team	W		L	PCT	W		L	PCT
Charleston †	15	–	3	.833	27	–	8	.771
Drexel	13	–	5	.722	20	–	12	.625
Hofstra	12	–	6	.667	20	–	13	.606
UNC Wilmington	12	–	6	.667	21	–	10	.677
Towson	11	–	7	.611	20	–	14	.588
Delaware	10	–	8	.556	19	–	14	.576
Stony Brook	10	–	8	.556	20	–	15	.571
Monmouth	10	–	8	.556	18	–	15	.545
Campbell	8	–	10	.444	14	–	18	.438
Northeastern	7	–	11	.389	12	–	20	.375
Elon	6	–	12	.333	13	–	19	.406
North Carolina A&T	5	–	13	.278	7	–	25	.219
William & Mary	4	–	14	.222	10	–	23	.303
Hampton	3	–	15	.167	9	–	24	.273
† 2024 CAA tournament winner

The 2023–24 CAA men's basketball season was the 38th season of Coastal Athletic Association basketball, taking place between November 2023 and March 2024. The season ended with the 2024 CAA men's basketball tournament.

This was the first season for the conference under the Coastal Athletic Association name. On July 20, 2023, the CAA announced it had changed its name from the Colonial Athletic Association to the Coastal Athletic Association. This was also the first CAA season with new conference member, Campbell.

== Head coaches ==
=== Coaching changes ===
- Monté Ross replaced Phillip Shumpert as North Carolina A&T head coach.

=== Coaches ===
Team	Head coach	Previous job	Year at school	Record at school	CAA record	CAA championships	NCAA tournaments
Campbell	Kevin McGeehan	Richmond (assoc.)	11	155–164	0–0	0	0
Charleston	Pat Kelsey	Winthrop	3	48–19	24–12	1	1
Delaware	Martin Ingelsby	Notre Dame (asst.)	8	112–103	53–64	1	1
Drexel	Zach Spiker	Army	8	93–118	46–71	1	1
Elon	Billy Taylor	Iowa (asst.)	2	8–24	6–12	0	0
Hampton	Edward Joyner	Hampton (asst.)	15	213–233	5–13	0	3
Hofstra	Speedy Claxton	Hofstra (asst.)	3	46–21	29–7	0	0
Monmouth	King Rice	Vanderbilt (asst.)	13	189–193	5–13	0	0
North Carolina A&T	Monté Ross	Temple (asst.)	1	0–0	0–0	0	0
Northeastern	Bill Coen	Boston College (asst.)	18	270–264	162–134	2	2
Stony Brook	Geno Ford	Stony Brook (Interim HC)	6	48–63	6–12	0	0
Towson	Pat Skerry	Pittsburgh (asst.)	13	193–185	110–98	0	0
UNC Wilmington	Takayo Siddle	NC State (asst.)	4	58–29	28–15	0	0
William & Mary	Dane Fischer	George Mason (asst.)	5	46–68	28–36	0	0

Notes:

- All records, appearances, titles, etc. are from time with current school only.
- Year at school includes 2023–24 season.
- Overall and CAA records are from time at current school and are through the end of the 2022–23 season.

== Preseason ==
=== Preseason poll ===
Rank	Team	Points
1	Charleston (10)	165
2	UNC Wilmington (3)	157
3	Drexel (1)	140
4	Hofstra	137
t5	Delaware	115
t5	Towson	115
7	Northeastern	84
8	William & Mary	77
9	Stony Brook	76
10	Elon	62
11	Monmouth	50
12	Campbell	45
13	Hampton	31
14	North Carolina A&T	20

() first place votes

=== Preseason All-Conference teams ===
Award	Recipients
First Team	Ante Brzovic (Charleston); Tyler Thomas (Hofstra); Charles Thompson (Towson); Trazarien White (UNC Wilmington); Amari Williams (Drexel)
Second Team	Jyáre Davis (Delaware); Anthony Dell'Orso (Campbell); Max Mackinnon (Elon); Reyne Smith (Charleston); Tyler Stephenson-Moore (Stony Brook)
Honorable Mention	Gabe Dorsey (William & Mary); Chris Doherty (Northeastern); Darlinstone Dubar (Hofstra); Maleeck Harden-Hayes (UNC Wilmington); Justin Moore (Drexel); Jordan Nesbitt (Hampton); Frankie Policelli (Charleston); Xander Rice (Monmouth)

Coastal Athletic Association Preseason Player of the Year: Amari Williams (Drexel)

== Regular season ==
=== Rankings ===
Legend
	Increase in ranking
	Decrease in ranking
	Not ranked previous week
RV	Received votes
(Italics)	Number of first place votes

		Pre	Wk 2	Wk 3	Wk 4	Wk 5	Wk 6	Wk 7	Wk 8	Wk 9	Wk 10	Wk 11	Wk 12	Wk 13	Wk 14	Wk 15	Wk 16	Wk 17	Wk 18	Wk 19	Final
Campbell	AP																				
Campbell	C																				
Charleston	AP	RV																			
Charleston	C																				
Delaware	AP																				
Delaware	C																				
Drexel	AP																				
Drexel	C																				
Elon	AP																				
Elon	C																				
Hampton	AP																				
Hampton	C																				
Hofstra	AP																				
Hofstra	C																				
Monmouth	AP																				
Monmouth	C																				
North Carolina A&T	AP																				
North Carolina A&T	C																				
Northeastern	AP																				
Northeastern	C																				
Stony Brook	AP																				
Stony Brook	C																				
Towson	AP																				
Towson	C																				
UNC Wilmington	AP																				
UNC Wilmington	C																				
William & Mary	AP																				
William & Mary	C																				

=== Conference matrix ===
This table summarizes the head-to-head results between teams in conference play.

	Campbell	Charleston	Delaware	Drexel	Elon	Hampton	Hofstra	Monmouth	North Carolina A&T	Northeastern	Stony Brook	Towson	UNC Wilmington	William & Mary
vs. Campbell	–	0-0	0–0	0–0	0–0	0–0	0–0	0–0	0–0	0–0	0–0	0–0	0–0	0–0
vs. Charleston	0–0	–	0–0	0–0	0–0	0–0	0–0	0–0	0–0	0–0	0–0	0–0	0–0	0–0
vs. Delaware	0–0	0–0	–	0–0	0–0	0–0	0–0	0–0	0–0	0–0	0–0	0–0	0–0	0–0
vs. Drexel	0–0	0–0	0–0	–	0–0	0–0	0–0	0–0	0–0	0–0	0–0	0–0	0–0	0–0
vs. Elon	0–0	0–0	0–0	0–0	–	0–0	0–0	0–0	0–0	0–0	0–0	0–0	0–0	0–0
vs. Hampton	0–0	0–0	0–0	0–0	0–0	–	0–0	0–0	0–0	0–0	0–0	0–0	0–0	0–0
vs. Hofstra	0–0	0–0	0–0	0–0	0–0	0–0	–	0–0	0–0	0–0	0–0	0–0	0–0	0–0
vs. Monmouth	0–0	0–0	0–0	0–0	0–0	0–0	0–0	–	0–0	0–0	0–0	0–0	0–0	0–0
vs. North Carolina A&T	0–0	0–0	0–0	0–0	0–0	0–0	0–0	0–0	–	0–0	0–0	0–0	0–0	0–0
vs. Northeastern	0–0	0–0	0–0	0–0	0–0	0–0	0–0	0–0	0–0	–	0–0	0–0	0–0	0–0
vs. Stony Brook	0–0	0–0	0–0	0–0	0–0	0–0	0–0	0–0	0–0	0–0	–	0–0	0–0	0–0
vs. Towson	0–0	0–0	0–0	0–0	0–0	0–0	0–0	0–0	0–0	0–0	0–0	–	0–0	0–0
vs. UNC Wilmington	0–0	0–0	0–0	0–0	0–0	0–0	0–0	0–0	0–0	0–0	0–0	0–0	–	0–0
vs. William & Mary	0–0	0–0	0–0	0–0	0–0	0–0	0–0	0–0	0–0	0–0	0–0	0–0	0–0	–
Total	0-0	0–0	0–0	0–0	0–0	0–0	0–0	0–0	0–0	0–0	0–0	0–0	0–0	0–0

== Postseason ==
=== NCAA tournament ===
The CAA had one bid to the 2023 NCAA Division I men's basketball tournament, that being the automatic bid of Charleston by winning the conference tournament.

Seed	Region	School	First Four	First Round	Second Round	Sweet 16	Elite Eight	Final Four	Championship
14	West	Charleston	Bye	vs (4) Alabama					
Bids		W-L (%):	0–0 (–)	0–1 (.000)	0–0 (–)	0–0 (–)	0–0 (–)	0–0 (–)	TOTAL: 0–0 (–)

=== National Invitation tournament ===
Hofstra received an automatic bid to the 2023 National Invitation Tournament as regular-season conference champions.

Seed	School	First Round	Second Round	Quarterfinals	Semifinals	Championship
Bids	W-L (%):	0–0 (–)	0–0 (–)	0–0 (–)	0–0 (–)	TOTAL: 0–0 (–)

=== College Basketball Invitational ===
Seed	School	First Round	Quarterfinals	Semifinals	Championship
Bids	W-L (%):	0–0 (–)	0–0 (–)	0–0 (–)	TOTAL: 0–0 (–)

== Awards and honors ==
=== Regular season ===
==== CAA Player of the Week ====
- Nov. 13 – Xander Rice (Monmouth)
- Nov. 20 – Ty Simpkins (Elon)
- Nov. 27 – Tyler Thomas (Hofstra)
- Dec. 4 – Trazarien White (UNC Wilmington)
- Dec. 11 – Christian May (Towson), Jalun Trent (Delaware)
- Dec. 18 – Jyáre Davis (Delaware)
- Dec. 26 – Landon Glasper (North Carolina A&T)
- Jan. 1 – Jalun Trent (Delaware)(2)
- Jan. 8 – Bryce Butler (Charleston)
- Jan. 15 – Xander Rice (Monmouth)(2)
- Jan. 22 – Landon Glasper (North Carolina A&T)(2)
- Jan. 29 – Darlinstone Dubar (Hofstra), Christian May (Towson)(2)
- Feb. 5 – Tyler Thomas (Hofstra)(2)
- Feb. 12 – Jyáre Davis (Delaware)(2)
- Feb. 19 – Max Mackinnon (Elon)
- Feb. 26 – Tyler Thomas (Hofstra)(3)
- Mar. 4 – Reyne Smith (Charleston)

==== CAA Rookie of the Week ====
- Nov. 13 – Tyler Tejada (Towson)
- Nov. 20 – Nick Dorn (Elon)
- Nov. 27 – Abdi Bashir Jr. (Monmouth)
- Dec. 4 – Jordan Crawford (Charleston)
- Dec. 11 – Jared Frey (Stony Brook)
- Dec. 18 – James Scott (Charleston)
- Dec. 26 – James Scott (Charleston)(2)
- Jan. 1 – Nick Dorn (Elon)(2)
- Jan. 8 – Nick Dorn (Elon)(3)
- Jan. 15 – Tyler Tejada (Towson)(2)
- Jan. 22 – Tyler Tejada (Towson)(3)
- Jan. 29 – Dylan Williamson (Towson)
- Feb. 5 – Jerry Deng (Hampton), Dylan Williamson (Towson)(2)
- Feb. 12 – Jaret Valencia (Monmouth)
- Feb. 19 – Jaret Valencia (Monmouth)(2)
- Feb. 26 – Tyler Tejada (Towson)(4)
- Mar. 4 – Nick Dorn (Elon)(4)

=== Postseason ===
==== CAA All-Conference teams and awards ====
Award	Recipients
Player of the Year	Tyler Thomas (Hofstra)
Coach of the Year	Pat Kelsey (Charleston)
Rookie of the Year	Tyler Tejada (Towson)
Defensive Player of the Year	Amari Williams (Drexel)
Sixth Man of the Year	Bryce Butler (Charleston)
Dean Ehlers Leadership Award	Zac Ervin (Elon)
Scholar-Athlete of the Year	Christian Ray (Delaware)
First Team	Ante Brzovic (Charleston); Xander Rice (Monmouth); Tyler Thomas (Hofstra); Trazarien White (UNC Wilmington); Amari Williams (Drexel)
Second Team	Jyáre Davis (Delaware); Anthony Dell'Orso (Campbell); Darlinstone Dubar (Hofstra); Reyne Smith (Charleston); Tyler Stephenson-Moore (Stony Brook)
Third Team	Ben Burnham (Charleston); Landon Glasper (North Carolina A&T); Justin Moore (Drexel); Shykeim Phillips (UNC Wilmington); Charles Thompson (Towson)
All-Defensive Team	Jaquan Carlos (Hofstra); Shykeim Phillips (UNC Wilmington); Charles Thompson (Towson); Jaret Valencia (Monmouth); Amari Williams (Drexel)
All-Rookie Team	Nick Dorn (Elon); James Scott (Charleston); Tyler Tejada (Towson); Jaret Valencia (Monmouth); Dylan Williamson (Towson)
All-Tournament Team	Reyne Smith (Charleston); Frankie Policelli (Charleston); Kobe Rodgers (Charleston); Keenan Fitzmorris (Stony Brook); Tyler Stephenson-Moore (Stony Brook); Tyler Thomas (Hofstra)
Tournament MVP	Reyne Smith (Charleston)

== Attendance ==
Team	Arena	Capacity	Game 1	Game 2	Game 3	Game 4	Game 5	Game 6	Game 7	Game 8	Total	Average	% of Capacity
Team	Arena	Capacity	Game 9	Game 10	Game 11	Game 12	Game 13	Game 14	Game 15	Game 16	Total	Average	% of Capacity
Campbell	John W. Pope Jr. Convocation Center	3,095											0%
Charleston	TD Arena	5,100											0%
Delaware	Bob Carpenter Center	5,100											0%
Drexel	Daskalakis Athletic Center	2,509											0%
Elon	Schar Center	5,100											0%
Hampton	Hampton Convocation Center	7,200											0%
Hofstra	Mack Sports Complex	5,023											0%
Monmouth	OceanFirst Bank Center	4,100											0%
North Carolina A&T	Corbett Sports Center	5,000											0%
Northeastern	Matthews Arena	6,000											0%
Stony Brook	Island Federal Credit Union Arena	4,160											0%
Towson	SECU Arena	5,200											0%
UNC Wilmington	Trask Coliseum	5,200											0%
William & Mary	Kaplan Arena	8,600											0%
