= 2023–24 Elon Phoenix men's basketball team =

American college basketball season

2023–24 Elon Phoenix men's basketball
- Conference: Coastal Athletic Association
- Record: 13–19 (6–12 CAA)
- Head coach: Billy Taylor (2nd season)
- Assistant coaches: Greg Herenda; Josh Gross; Ryan Saunders
- Home arena: Schar Center

2023–24 CAA men's basketball standings
	Conf.				Overall
Team	W		L	PCT	W		L	PCT
Charleston †	15	–	3	.833	27	–	8	.771
Drexel	13	–	5	.722	20	–	12	.625
Hofstra	12	–	6	.667	20	–	13	.606
UNC Wilmington	12	–	6	.667	21	–	10	.677
Towson	11	–	7	.611	20	–	14	.588
Delaware	10	–	8	.556	19	–	14	.576
Stony Brook	10	–	8	.556	20	–	15	.571
Monmouth	10	–	8	.556	18	–	15	.545
Campbell	8	–	10	.444	14	–	18	.438
Northeastern	7	–	11	.389	12	–	20	.375
Elon	6	–	12	.333	13	–	19	.406
North Carolina A&T	5	–	13	.278	7	–	25	.219
William & Mary	4	–	14	.222	10	–	23	.303
Hampton	3	–	15	.167	9	–	24	.273
† 2024 CAA tournament winner

The 2023–24 Elon Phoenix men's basketball team represented Elon University during the 2023–24 NCAA Division I men's basketball season. The Phoenix, led by second-year head coach Billy Taylor, played their home games at the Schar Center in Elon, North Carolina as members of the Coastal Athletic Association (CAA).

The Phoenix finished the season 13–19, 6–12 in CAA play, to finish in eleventh place. They were defeated by Hampton in the first round of the CAA tournament.

== Previous season ==
The Phoenix finished the 2022–23 season 8–24, 6–12 in CAA play, to finish in a three-way tie for ninth place. They were defeated by William & Mary in the second round of the CAA tournament.

== Roster ==
2023–24 Elon Phoenix men's basketball team
Players
Coaches

Pos.	#	Name	Height	Weight	Year	Previous school	Hometown
G	0	Nick Dorn	6 ft 7 in (2.01 m)	200 lb (91 kg)	Fr	Julius L. Chambers HS	Charlotte, NC
F	1	Kendall Campbell	6 ft 8 in (2.03 m)	243 lb (110 kg)	Fr	Combine Academy	Atlanta, GA
F	2	JaDun Michael	6 ft 5 in (1.96 m)	198 lb (90 kg)	Sr	The Burlington School	Burlington, NC
G	3	Max Mackinnon	6 ft 5 in (1.96 m)	205 lb (93 kg)	So	Lake Ginninderra College	Brisbane, Australia
F	4	Sam Sherry	6 ft 10 in (2.08 m)	220 lb (100 kg)	Jr	Cumberland Valley HS	Mechanicsburg, PA
G	5	Grant II Gondrezick	6 ft 1 in (1.85 m)	173 lb (78 kg)	Fr	Benton Harbor HS	Benton Harbor, MI
G	10	Rob Higgins	6 ft 1 in (1.85 m)	179 lb (81 kg)	Sr	St. Francis Brooklyn	Middletown, NJ
G	11	TK Simpkins	6 ft 4 in (1.93 m)	184 lb (83 kg)	So	Northwest Florida State College	Brooklyn, NY
F	12	Isaac Harrell	6 ft 8 in (2.03 m)	195 lb (88 kg)	Fr	Jonesboro HS	Jonesboro, AR
G	13	Savion Taylor	6 ft 4 in (1.93 m)	210 lb (95 kg)	Fr	The Burlington School	Burlington, NC
G	14	Zac Ervin	6 ft 5 in (1.96 m)	201 lb (91 kg)	GS	Gate City HS	Gate City, VA
G	15	Ned Hull	6 ft 3 in (1.91 m)	180 lb (82 kg)	Fr	Charlotte Latin School	Charlotte, NC
G	22	LA Pratt	6 ft 5 in (1.96 m)	185 lb (84 kg)	So	Lincoln Park HS	Columbus, OH
F	23	Otto Luessenhop	6 ft 8 in (2.03 m)	190 lb (86 kg)	So	Northfield Mount Hermon School	Amagansett, NY
F	55	Deandre Smart	6 ft 6 in (1.98 m)	230 lb (104 kg)	So	Loomis Chaffee School	Savannah, GA

Head coach

- Billy Taylor (Notre Dame)

Assistant coach(es)

- Greg Herenda (Merrimack)
- Josh Gross (UNC Greensboro)
- Ryan Saunders (Barry)

Legend

- (C) Team captain
- (S) Suspended
- (I) Ineligible
- (W) Walk-on
- Injured
- Current redshirt

Roster

== Schedule and results ==
Date time, TV	Rank^{#}	Opponent^{#}	Result	Record	High points	High rebounds	High assists	Site (attendance) city, state
Exhibition
October 31, 2023*; 7:00 p.m.		William Peace	W 98–68	–	22 – Ervin	10 – Smart	6 – Hull	Schar Center (452); Elon, NC
Non-conference regular season
November 6, 2023*; 8:00 p.m., ACCNX/ESPN+		at Wake Forest	L 78–101	0–1	17 – Ervin	5 – Simpkins	4 – Mackinnon	LJVM Coliseum (6,641); Winston-Salem, NC
November 9, 2023*; 7:00 p.m., FloHoops		East Tennessee State	W 79–76	1–1	17 – Mackinnon	7 – Mackinnon	3 – 2 tied	Schar Center (1,514); Elon, NC
November 12, 2023*; 2:00 p.m.		at North Dakota	L 68–85	1–2	17 – Mackinnon	8 – Sherry	3 – 2 tied	Betty Engelstad Sioux Center (1,291); Grand Forks, ND
November 17, 2023*; 7:30 p.m., ESPN+		vs. IUPUI; Rock Hill Classic	W 86–72	2–2	19 – 2 tied	5 – 2 tied	10 – Higgins	Rock Hill Sports & Event Center (909); Rock Hill, SC
November 18, 2023*; 7:30 p.m., ESPN+		vs. Holy Cross; Rock Hill Classic	W 83–69	3–2	16 – Mackinnon	6 – Sherry	6 – Pratt	Rock Hill Sports & Event Center (711); Rock Hill, SC
November 19, 2023*; 2:30 p.m., ESPN+		vs. Winthrop; Rock Hill Classic	L 70–78	3–3	20 – Higgins	7 – Simpkins	5 – Simpkins	Rock Hill Sports & Event Center (944); Rock Hill, SC
November 27, 2023*; 7:00 p.m., FloHoops		Presbyterian	W 82–79	4–3	18 – Ervin	9 – Simpkins	3 – Pratt	Schar Center (1,284); Elon, NC
November 30, 2023*; 7:00 p.m., FloHoops		Warren Wilson	W 127–56	5–3	14 – Smart	10 – Mackinnon	5 – Mackinnon	Schar Center (1,371); Elon, NC
December 3, 2023*; 2:00 p.m., ESPN+		at Radford	L 72–82	5–4	23 – Simpkins	7 – Campbell	2 – 3 tied	Dedmon Center (1,514); Radford, VA
December 10, 2023*; 4:00 p.m., ESPN+		at UNC Greensboro	L 73–82	5–5	20 – Higgins	11 – Sherry	3 – Pratt	Greensboro Coliseum (1,484); Greensboro, NC
December 15, 2023*; 7:00 p.m., FloHoops		Bridgewater	W 104–70	6–5	25 – Dorn	7 – Sherry	6 – Higgins	Schar Center (1,319); Elon, NC
December 22, 2023*; 6:00 p.m., SECN		at South Carolina	L 43–70	6–6	12 – Sherry	8 – Simpkins	2 – 3 tied	Colonial Life Arena (10,203); Columbia, SC
December 29, 2023*; 2:00 p.m., FloHoops		Valparaiso	W 82–78	7–6	19 – Higgins	7 – Pratt	4 – 2 tied	Schar Center (1,620); Elon, NC
CAA regular season
January 4, 2024; 7:00 p.m., FloHoops		at William & Mary	L 70–77	7–7 (0–1)	19 – Higgins	6 – Mackinnon	3 – 2 tied	Kaplan Arena (2,733); Williamsburg, VA
January 6, 2024; 7:00 p.m., FloHoops		North Carolina A&T	W 77–59	8–7 (1–1)	20 – Sherry	9 – Sherry	8 – Higgins	Schar Center (2,281); Elon, NC
January 11, 2024; 7:00 p.m., FloHoops		at Charleston	L 62–80	8–8 (1–2)	17 – Mackinnon	8 – Mackinnon	4 – Simpkins	TD Arena (4,679); Charleston, SC
January 13, 2024; 7:00 p.m., FloHoops		Drexel	L 69–89	8–9 (1–3)	18 – Higgins	5 – Simpkins	6 – Simpkins	Schar Center (1,770); Elon, NC
January 18, 2024; 7:00 p.m., FloHoops		UNC Wilmington	L 70–82	8–10 (1–4)	16 – 2 tied	7 – 2 tied	4 – Simpkins	Schar Center (2,078); Elon, NC
January 20, 2024; 7:00 p.m., FloHoops		Northeastern	L 72–84	8–11 (1–5)	20 – Mackinnon	5 – Sherry	5 – Higgins	Schar Center (2,068); Elon, NC
January 25, 2024; 5:00 p.m., CBSSN		at Campbell	L 68–78	8–12 (1–6)	19 – Ervin	10 – Dorn	3 – Simpkins	Gore Arena (1,813); Buies Creek, NC
January 27, 2024; 2:00 p.m., FloHoops		at Hampton	W 80–74	9–12 (2–6)	16 – Sherry	6 – Harrell	7 – Mackinnon	Hampton Convocation Center (1,122); Hampton, VA
February 1, 2024; 7:00 p.m., FloHoops		Campbell	L 67–69	9–13 (2–7)	15 – Sherry	7 – Mackinnon	4 – Mackinnon	Schar Center (2,160); Elon, NC
February 3, 2024; 2:00 p.m., CBSSN		at North Carolina A&T	W 69–65	10–13 (3–7)	12 – Ervin	8 – Harrell	4 – Mackinnon	Corbett Sports Center (2,006); Greensboro, NC
February 8, 2024; 7:00 p.m., FloHoops		Stony Brook	L 64–79	10–14 (3–8)	15 – 2 tied	5 – Harrell	10 – Simpkins	Schar Center (2,045); Elon, NC
February 12, 2024; 9:00 p.m., CBSSN		at Towson	L 55–80	10–15 (3–9)	19 – Simpkins	6 – Simpkins	3 – Pratt	SECU Arena (2,112); Towson, MD
February 15, 2024; 7:00 p.m., FloHoops		Delaware	W 73–67	11–15 (4–9)	26 – Mackinnon	6 – Simpkins	4 – Simpkins	Schar Center (1,670); Elon, NC
February 17, 2024; 7:00 p.m., FloHoops		at UNC Wilmington	W 73–72	12–15 (5–9)	21 – Mackinnon	8 – Harrell	5 – Mackinnon	Trask Coliseum (5,100); Wilmington, NC
February 22, 2024; 7:00 p.m., FloHoops		at Northeastern	L 58–61	12–16 (5–10)	14 – Dorn	10 – Sherry	3 – 2 tied	Matthews Arena (1,147); Boston, MA
February 24, 2024; 2:00 p.m., FloHoops		at Hofstra	L 64–87	12–17 (5–11)	24 – Simpkins	8 – Sherry	4 – Simpkins	Mack Sports Complex (2,613); Hempstead, NY
February 29, 2024; 7:00 p.m., CBSSN		William & Mary	W 76–71	13–17 (6–11)	18 – Simpkins	8 – Simpkins	5 – Mackinnon	Schar Center (1,836); Elon, NC
March 2, 2024; 1:00 p.m., FloHoops		Monmouth	L 70–85	13–18 (6–12)	31 – Simpkins	9 – Simpkins	5 – Simpkins	Schar Center (1,735); Elon, NC
CAA tournament
March 8, 2024; 4:30 p.m., FloHoops	(11)	vs. (14) Hampton; First round	L 55–56	13–19	18 – Simpkins	10 – 2 tied	4 – Simpkins	Entertainment and Sports Arena (1,706); Washington, D.C.
*Non-conference game. ^{#}Rankings from AP poll. (#) Tournament seedings in parentheses. All times are in Eastern.
