= 2023–24 William & Mary Tribe men's basketball team =

American college basketball season

2023–24 William & Mary Tribe men's basketball
- Conference: Coastal Athletic Association
- Record: 10–23 (4–14 CAA)
- Head coach: Dane Fischer (5th season)
- Assistant coaches: Mike Howland; Julian Boatner; Jimmy Fenerty
- Home arena: Kaplan Arena

2023–24 CAA men's basketball standings
	Conf.				Overall
Team	W		L	PCT	W		L	PCT
Charleston †	15	–	3	.833	27	–	8	.771
Drexel	13	–	5	.722	20	–	12	.625
Hofstra	12	–	6	.667	20	–	13	.606
UNC Wilmington	12	–	6	.667	21	–	10	.677
Towson	11	–	7	.611	20	–	14	.588
Delaware	10	–	8	.556	19	–	14	.576
Stony Brook	10	–	8	.556	20	–	15	.571
Monmouth	10	–	8	.556	18	–	15	.545
Campbell	8	–	10	.444	14	–	18	.438
Northeastern	7	–	11	.389	12	–	20	.375
Elon	6	–	12	.333	13	–	19	.406
North Carolina A&T	5	–	13	.278	7	–	25	.219
William & Mary	4	–	14	.222	10	–	23	.303
Hampton	3	–	15	.167	9	–	24	.273
† 2024 CAA tournament winner

The 2023–24 William & Mary Tribe men's basketball team represented the College of William & Mary during the 2023–24 NCAA Division I men's basketball season. The Tribe, led by fifth-year head coach Dane Fischer, played their home games at Kaplan Arena in Williamsburg, Virginia as members of the Coastal Athletic Association (CAA).

== Previous season ==
The Tribe finished the 2022–23 season 13–20, 7–11 in CAA play, to finish in eighth place. They defeated Elon in the second round of the CAA tournament, before falling to top-seeded Hofstra in the quarterfinals.

== Offseason ==
=== Departures ===
Name	Number	Pos.	Height	Weight	Year	Hometown	Reason for departure
Anders Nelson	0	G	6' 1"	172	Graduate student	Edina, MN	Graduated and signed with Starwings Basel
Tyler Rice	12	G	6' 1"	183	Sophomore	Columbia, SC	Transferred to East Tennessee State
Miguel Ayesa	15	G	6' 5"	200	Senior	Madrid, Spain	Transferred to USC Upstate
Chris Mullins	24	G	6' 3"	192	Graduate student	Grand Prairie, TX	Graduated
Ben Wight	35	F	6' 9"	220	Junior	Columbus, OH	Transferred to Toledo

=== Incoming transfers ===
Name	Number	Pos.	Height	Weight	Year	Hometown	Previous school
Caleb Dorsey	0	F	6' 8"	235	Junior	Westminster, MD	Transferred from Penn State
Sean Houpt	7	G	6' 4"	200	Graduate student	Danville, IL	Transferred from Florida Tech
Trey Moss	8	G	6' 3"	180	Sophomore	Orlando, FL	Transferred from USF

=== 2023 recruiting class ===
College recruiting information
Name	Hometown	School	Height	Weight	Commit date
Jayden Lemond; G	Marietta, GA	Blair Academy	6 ft 4 in (1.93 m)	180 lb (82 kg)	Nov 13, 2022
Jayden Lemond; G	Recruit ratings: Scout: Rivals: (80)				
Tai Hamilton; F	Charlotte, NC	1 of 1 Academy	6 ft 10 in (2.08 m)	192 lb (87 kg)	Apr 13, 2023
Tai Hamilton; F	Recruit ratings: Scout: Rivals: (NR)				
Overall recruit ranking: 247Sports: 105
Note: In many cases, Scout, Rivals, 247Sports, On3, and ESPN may conflict in their listings of height and weight.; In these cases, the average was taken. ESPN grades are on a 100-point scale.; Sources: "2023 Team Ranking". Rivals.

== Roster ==
2023–24 William & Mary Tribe men's basketball team
Players
Coaches

Pos.	#	Name	Height	Weight	Year	Previous school	Hometown
F	0	Caleb Dorsey	6 ft 8 in (2.03 m)	235 lb (107 kg)	Jr	Penn State	Westminster, MD
G	1	Jake Milkereit	6 ft 5 in (1.96 m)	200 lb (91 kg)	Sr	Bishop Lynch High School	Dallas, TX
G	2	Chase Lowe	6 ft 5 in (1.96 m)	201 lb (91 kg)	So	Weddington High School	Weddington, NC
G	4	Matteus Case	6 ft 5 in (1.96 m)	196 lb (89 kg)	Jr	Providence	Pickering, ON
F	5	Noah Collier	6 ft 8 in (2.03 m)	220 lb (100 kg)	Jr	Pittsburgh	Mullica Hill, NJ
G	7	Sean Houpt	6 ft 4 in (1.93 m)	200 lb (91 kg)	GS	Florida Tech	Danville, IL
G	8	Trey Moss	6 ft 3 in (1.91 m)	180 lb (82 kg)	So	South Florida	Orlando, FL
G/F	11	Jack Karasinski	6 ft 7 in (2.01 m)	206 lb (93 kg)	So	Catholic Central High School	Grand Rapids, MI
G	12	Jayden Lemond	6 ft 4 in (1.93 m)	180 lb (82 kg)	Fr	Blair Academy	Marietta, GA
G/F	21	Gabe Dorsey	6 ft 6 in (1.98 m)	215 lb (98 kg)	Jr	Vanderbilt	Westminster, MD
F	22	Nick Evans	6 ft 9 in (2.06 m)	200 lb (91 kg)	RS Fr	Gonzaga	Alexandria, VA
F	24	Tai Hamilton	6 ft 10 in (2.08 m)	192 lb (87 kg)	Fr	1 of 1 Academy	Charlotte, NC
G	25	Miles Hicks	6 ft 1 in (1.85 m)	156 lb (71 kg)	So	St. Albans School	Upper Marlboro, MD
F	33	Charlie Williams	6 ft 10 in (2.08 m)	220 lb (100 kg)	So	Carmel High School	Carmel, IN

Head coach

- Dane Fischer (Ithaca)

Assistant coach(es)

- Mike Howland (DePauw)
- Julian Boatner (William & Mary)
- Jimmy Fenerty (Dickinson)

Legend

- (C) Team captain
- (S) Suspended
- (I) Ineligible
- (W) Walk-on
- Injured
- Current redshirt

Roster
Last update: November 21, 2023

== Schedule and results ==
Date time, TV	Rank^{#}	Opponent^{#}	Result	Record	Site (attendance) city, state
Non-conference regular season
November 6, 2023*; 7:30 p.m., FloHoops		Regent	W 84–29	1–0	Kaplan Arena (3,267); Williamsburg, VA
November 9, 2023*; 7:00 p.m., FloHoops		American	W 75–56	2–0	Kaplan Arena (2,716); Williamsburg, VA
November 11, 2023*; 1:00 p.m., ESPN+		at George Washington	L 89–95	2–1	Charles E. Smith Center (1,754); Washington, D.C.
November 16, 2023*; 9:00 p.m., MWN		vs. Omaha; Air Force Classic	L 83–89	2–2	Clune Arena (127); Colorado Springs, CO
November 17, 2023*; 6:30 p.m., MWN		at Air Force; Air Force Classic	L 71–80 ^{OT}	2–3	Clune Arena (1,411); Colorado Springs, CO
November 19, 2023*; 1:30 p.m., MWN		vs. Lindenwood; Air Force Classic	L 60–71	2–4	Clune Arena (126); Colorado Springs, CO
November 25, 2023*; 2:00 p.m., FloHoops		UMBC; Black Out	W 96–81	3–4	Kaplan Arena (2,742); Williamsburg, VA
November 28, 2023*; 7:00 p.m., HBCU+		at Norfolk State	L 62–96	3–5	Joseph G. Echols Memorial Hall (1,079); Norfolk, VA
December 2, 2023*; 6:00 p.m., ESPN+/Monumental		at Richmond	L 69–88	3–6	Robins Center (5,542); Richmond, VA
December 6, 2023*; 7:00 p.m., FloHoops		Old Dominion; Rivalry	W 84–79	4–6	Kaplan Arena (3,204); Williamsburg, VA
December 10, 2023*; 2:00 p.m., FloHoops		Virginia–Lynchburg	W 99–50	5–6	Kaplan Arena (2,551); Williamsburg, VA
December 21, 2023*; 7:00 p.m., ESPN+		at Pepperdine	L 59–71	5–7	Firestone Fieldhouse (207); Malibu, CA
December 30, 2023*; 12:00 p.m., ESPN+		at Navy	L 65–77	5–8	Alumni Hall (1,597); Annapolis, MD
CAA regular season
January 4, 2024; 7:00 p.m., FloHoops		Elon	W 77–70	6–8 (1–0)	Kaplan Arena (2,733); Williamsburg, VA
January 6, 2024; 2:00 p.m., FloHoops		Drexel	L 55–77	6–9 (1–1)	Kaplan Arena (3,286); Williamsburg, VA
January 11, 2024; 7:00 p.m., FloHoops		at Hampton	W 73–61	7–9 (2–1)	Hampton Convocation Center (1,372); Hampton, VA
January 13, 2024; 1:00 p.m., FloHoops		Stony Brook	L 59–63	7–10 (2–2)	Kaplan Arena (2,886); Williamsburg, VA
January 18, 2024; 7:00 p.m., FloHoops		Campbell	L 64–77	7–11 (2–3)	Kaplan Arena (2,748); Williamsburg, VA
January 20, 2024; 2:00 p.m., FloHoops		at North Carolina A&T	L 69–76	7–12 (2–4)	Corbett Sports Center (2,418); Greensboro, NC
January 25, 2024; 7:00 p.m., FloHoops		at Hofstra	L 55–64	7–13 (2–5)	Mack Sports Complex (1,376); Hempstead, NY
January 27, 2024; 12:00 p.m., FloHoops		at Northeastern	W 72–68	8–13 (3–5)	Matthews Arena (1,101); Boston, MA
February 1, 2024; 7:00 p.m., CBSSN		Delaware	L 53–81	8–14 (3–6)	Kaplan Arena (3,057); Williamsburg, VA
February 3, 2024; 2:00 p.m., FloHoops		Charleston	L 83–84	8–15 (3–7)	Kaplan Arena (5,062); Williamsburg, VA
February 8, 2024; 7:00 p.m., FloHoops		at Monmouth	L 64–68	8–16 (3–8)	OceanFirst Bank Center (1,586); West Long Branch, NJ
February 10, 2024; 4:00 p.m., FloHoops		at Delaware	L 58–69	8–17 (3–9)	Bob Carpenter Center (2,651); Newark, DE
February 15, 2024; 7:00 p.m., FloHoops		Towson	L 52–61	8–18 (3–10)	Kaplan Arena (2,352); Williamsburg, VA
February 19, 2024; 8:00 p.m., CBSSN		at Charleston	L 57–65	8–19 (3–11)	TD Arena (4,517); Charleston, SC
February 22, 2024; 7:00 p.m., FloHoops		UNC Wilmington	L 65–81	8–20 (3–12)	Kaplan Arena (2,179); Williamsburg, VA
February 24, 2024; 1:00 p.m., FloHoops		at Stony Brook	L 62–75	8–21 (3–13)	Island Federal Arena (2,340); Stony Brook, NY
February 29, 2024; 7:00 p.m., CBSSN		at Elon	L 71–76	8–22 (3–14)	Schar Center (1,836); Elon, NC
March 2, 2024; 2:00 p.m., FloHoops		Hampton	W 85–73	9–22 (4–14)	Kaplan Arena (3,916); Williamsburg, VA
CAA tournament
March 8, 2024; 2:00 p.m., FloHoops	(13)	vs. (12) North Carolina A&T; First round	W 79–62	10–22	Entertainment and Sports Arena; Washington, D.C.
March 9, 2024; 2:30 p.m., FloHoops	(13)	vs. (5) Towson; Second round	L 56–67	10–23	Entertainment and Sports Arena (1,883); Washington, D.C.
*Non-conference game. ^{#}Rankings from AP poll. (#) Tournament seedings in parentheses. All times are in Eastern.
