= 2023–24 Delaware Fightin' Blue Hens men's basketball team =

American college basketball season

2023–24 Delaware Fightin' Blue Hens men's basketball
- Conference: Coastal Athletic Association
- Record: 19–14 (10–8 CAA)
- Head coach: Martin Ingelsby (8th season)
- Associate head coach: Bill Phillips
- Assistant coaches: James Robinson III; JJ Butler
- Home arena: Bob Carpenter Center

2023–24 CAA men's basketball standings
	Conf.				Overall
Team	W		L	PCT	W		L	PCT
Charleston †	15	–	3	.833	27	–	8	.771
Drexel	13	–	5	.722	20	–	12	.625
Hofstra	12	–	6	.667	20	–	13	.606
UNC Wilmington	12	–	6	.667	21	–	10	.677
Towson	11	–	7	.611	20	–	14	.588
Delaware	10	–	8	.556	19	–	14	.576
Stony Brook	10	–	8	.556	20	–	15	.571
Monmouth	10	–	8	.556	18	–	15	.545
Campbell	8	–	10	.444	14	–	18	.438
Northeastern	7	–	11	.389	12	–	20	.375
Elon	6	–	12	.333	13	–	19	.406
North Carolina A&T	5	–	13	.278	7	–	25	.219
William & Mary	4	–	14	.222	10	–	23	.303
Hampton	3	–	15	.167	9	–	24	.273
† 2024 CAA tournament winner

The 2023–24 Delaware Fightin' Blue Hens men's basketball team represented the University of Delaware during the 2023–24 NCAA Division I men's basketball season. The Fightin' Blue Hens, led by eighth-year head coach Martin Ingelsby, played their home games at the Bob Carpenter Center in Newark, Delaware as members of the Coastal Athletic Association (CAA).

== Previous season ==
The Fightin' Blue Hens finished the 2022–23 season 17–16, 8–10 in CAA play, to finish in a tie for sixth place. They defeated Northeastern in the second round of the CAA tournament, before falling to Towson in the quarterfinals.

== Roster ==
2023–24 Delaware Fightin' Blue Hens men's basketball team
Players
Coaches

Pos.	#	Name	Height	Weight	Year	Previous school	Hometown
G	0	Zion Bethea	6 ft 4 in (1.93 m)	205 lb (93 kg)	Sr	St. Francis Brooklyn	South Orange, NJ
G	1	Gerald Jr. Drumgoole	6 ft 5 in (1.96 m)	205 lb (93 kg)	GS	Albany	Rochester, NY
G	2	Jalun Trent	6 ft 4 in (1.93 m)	190 lb (86 kg)	Sr	North Dakota	Baltimore, MD
G	3	Cavan Reilly	6 ft 4 in (1.93 m)	188 lb (85 kg)	So	Bishop O'Connell High School	Lovettsville, VA
G	4	Niels Lane	6 ft 5 in (1.96 m)	215 lb (98 kg)	Sr	Florida	Freehold, NJ
G	5	Christian Ray	6 ft 6 in (1.98 m)	210 lb (95 kg)	Sr	La Salle	Gap, PA
G	10	Brandon Baffone	6 ft 1 in (1.85 m)	175 lb (79 kg)	Fr	Salesianum School	Hockessin, DE
G	11	Kobe Jerome	6 ft 4 in (1.93 m)	190 lb (86 kg)	Jr	UC Riverside	Harlem, NY
F	13	Jyáre Davis	6 ft 7 in (2.01 m)	215 lb (98 kg)	Sr	Providence	Newark, DE
F	15	Houston Emory	6 ft 9 in (2.06 m)	195 lb (88 kg)	So	Blue Ridge School	Devon, PA
F	23	Gabe Moss	6 ft 8 in (2.03 m)	218 lb (99 kg)	So	The Hill School	Pottstown, PA
G	24	Wes Jr. Peterson	6 ft 6 in (1.98 m)	205 lb (93 kg)	Jr	Bishop O'Connell High School	Alexandria, Virginia
F	34	O.D. Ogunbo	6 ft 8 in (2.03 m)	205 lb (93 kg)	Sr	Delcastle High School	Lagos, Nigeria
F	44	Tyler Houser	6 ft 9 in (2.06 m)	235 lb (107 kg)	So	VMI	Camp Hill, PA

Head coach

- Martin Ingelsby (Notre Dame)

Assistant coach(es)

- Bill Phillips (Saint Joseph's)
- James Robinson III (Pittsburgh)
- JJ Butler (Lipscomb)

Legend

- (C) Team captain
- (S) Suspended
- (I) Ineligible
- (W) Walk-on
- Injured
- Current redshirt

Roster
Last update: November 2, 2023

== Schedule and results ==
Date time, TV	Rank^{#}	Opponent^{#}	Result	Record	Site (attendance) city, state
Non-conference regular season
November 6, 2023*; 7:00 p.m., ESPN+		at Bucknell	W 78–57	1–0	Sojka Pavilion (2,427); Lewisburg, PA
November 8, 2023*; 7:00 p.m., FloHoops		Goldey–Beacom	W 101–68	2–0	Bob Carpenter Center (2,239); Newark, DE
November 12, 2023*; 1:00 p.m., FloHoops		Air Force	W 65–57	3–0	Bob Carpenter Center (2,028); Newark, DE
November 15, 2023*; 7:00 p.m., YouTube		at Delaware State	W 78–67	4–0	Memorial Hall (1,544); Dover, DE
November 24, 2023*; 1:30 p.m., FloHoops		vs. Brown; Nassau Championship first round	W 67–59	5–0	Baha Mar Convention Center (213); Nassau, Bahamas
November 25, 2023*; 4:30 p.m., FloHoops		vs. UNC Greensboro; Nassau Championship semifinals	L 77–88	5–1	Baha Mar Convention Center (293); Nassau, Bahamas
November 26, 2023*; 4:30 p.m., FloHoops		vs. George Washington; Nassau Championship 3rd-place game	L 71–81	5–2	Baha Mar Convention Center (379); Nassau, Bahamas
December 2, 2023*; 2:00 p.m., ESPN+		at Ohio	L 73–74	5–3	Convocation Center (4,512); Athens, OH
December 5, 2023*; 6:30 p.m., FS1		at Xavier	W 87–80	6–3	Cintas Center (10,035); Cincinnati, OH
December 11, 2023*; 7:00 p.m., ESPN+		at Robert Morris	W 73–69	7–3	UPMC Events Center (953); Moon Township, PA
December 16, 2023*; 4:30 p.m., FloHoops		vs. Rhode Island; Holiday Hoopfest	W 67–56	8–3	UBS Arena; Elmont, NY
December 20, 2023*; 7:00 p.m., FloHoops		Rider	L 85–88 ^{OT}	8–4	Bob Carpenter Center (1,582); Newark, DE
December 30, 2023*; 2:00 p.m., NBCSPHI		Princeton	L 82–84	8–5	Bob Carpenter Center (3,340); Newark, DE
CAA regular season
January 4, 2024; 7:00 p.m., FloHoops		Hampton	W 80–53	9–5 (1–0)	Bob Carpenter Center (1,824); Newark, DE
January 6, 2024; 2:00 p.m., FloHoops		at Hofstra	L 71–76	9–6 (1–1)	Mack Sports Complex (2,027); Hempstead, NY
January 11, 2024; 7:00 p.m., FloHoops		at Campbell	W 68–62	10–6 (2–1)	Gore Arena (1,843); Buies Creek, NC
January 14, 2024; 4:00 p.m., CBSSN		at UNC Wilmington	L 74–79	10–7 (2–2)	Trask Coliseum (5,100); Wilmington, NC
January 18, 2024; 7:00 p.m., NBCSPHI/SNY		Stony Brook	W 71–68	11–7 (3–2)	Bob Carpenter Center (1,747); Newark, DE
January 20, 2024; 2:00 p.m., FloHoops		at Drexel	L 67–86	11–8 (3–3)	Daskalakis Athletic Center (2,461); Philadelphia, PA
January 25, 2024; 7:00 p.m., FloHoops		North Carolina A&T	W 90–71	12–8 (4–3)	Bob Carpenter Center (1,661); Newark, DE
January 27, 2024; 2:00 p.m., CBSSN		Towson	L 56–67	12–9 (4–4)	Bob Carpenter Center (2,792); Newark, DE
February 1, 2024; 7:00 p.m., CBSSN		at William & Mary	W 81–53	13–9 (5–4)	Kaplan Arena (3,057); Williamsburg, VA
February 3, 2024; 2:00 p.m., FloHoops		Monmouth	W 84–80	14–9 (6–4)	Bob Carpenter Center (3,037); Newark, DE
February 8, 2024; 7:00 p.m., FloHoops		at Towson	W 74–62	15–9 (7–4)	SECU Arena (3,505); Towson, MD
February 10, 2024; 4:00 p.m., FloHoops		William & Mary	W 69–58	16–9 (8–4)	Bob Carpenter Center (2,651); Newark, DE
February 15, 2024; 7:00 p.m., FloHoops		at Elon	L 67–73	16–10 (8–5)	Schar Center (1,670); Elon, NC
February 17, 2024; 2:00 p.m., FloHoops		at North Carolina A&T	W 62–54	17–10 (9–5)	Corbett Sports Center (1,293); Greensboro, NC
February 22, 2024; 7:00 p.m., NBCSPHI		Charleston	L 71–90	17–11 (9–6)	Bob Carpenter Center (2,191); Newark, DE
February 26, 2024; 6:30 p.m., CBSSN		Drexel	L 60–70	17–12 (9–7)	Bob Carpenter Center (3,390); Newark, DE
February 29, 2024; 7:00 p.m., FloHoops		Northeastern	W 73–67	18–12 (10–7)	Bob Carpenter Center (1,798); Newark, DE
March 2, 2024; 6:30 p.m., FloHoops		at Stony Brook	L 56–79	18–13 (10–8)	Island Federal Arena (2,961); Stony Brook, NY
CAA tournament
March 9, 2024; 8:30 p.m., FloHoops	(6)	vs. (14) Hampton; Second round	W 80-50	19–13	Entertainment and Sports Arena (1,752); Washington, D.C.
March 10, 2024; 8:30 p.m., FloHoops	(6)	vs. (3) Hofstra; Quarterfinals	L 58–73	19–14	Entertainment and Sports Arena (1,688); Washington, D.C.
*Non-conference game. ^{#}Rankings from AP poll. (#) Tournament seedings in parentheses. All times are in Eastern.
