= 2023–24 North Carolina A&T Aggies men's basketball team =

Basketball team season

2023–24 North Carolina A&T Aggies men's basketball
- Conference: Coastal Athletic Association
- Record: 7–25 (5–13 CAA)
- Head coach: Monté Ross (1st season)
- Associate head coach: Jeff Rafferty
- Assistant coaches: Dorian Long; Ricky Moore
- Home arena: Corbett Sports Center

2023–24 CAA men's basketball standings
	Conf.				Overall
Team	W		L	PCT	W		L	PCT
Charleston †	15	–	3	.833	27	–	8	.771
Drexel	13	–	5	.722	20	–	12	.625
Hofstra	12	–	6	.667	20	–	13	.606
UNC Wilmington	12	–	6	.667	21	–	10	.677
Towson	11	–	7	.611	20	–	14	.588
Delaware	10	–	8	.556	19	–	14	.576
Stony Brook	10	–	8	.556	20	–	15	.571
Monmouth	10	–	8	.556	18	–	15	.545
Campbell	8	–	10	.444	14	–	18	.438
Northeastern	7	–	11	.389	12	–	20	.375
Elon	6	–	12	.333	13	–	19	.406
North Carolina A&T	5	–	13	.278	7	–	25	.219
William & Mary	4	–	14	.222	10	–	23	.303
Hampton	3	–	15	.167	9	–	24	.273
† 2024 CAA tournament winner

The 2023–24 North Carolina A&T Aggies men's basketball team represented North Carolina A&T State University during the 2023–24 NCAA Division I men's basketball season. The Aggies, led by first-year head coach Monté Ross, played their home games at the Corbett Sports Center in Greensboro, North Carolina as members of the Coastal Athletic Association (CAA).

== Previous season ==
The Aggies finished the 2022–23 season 13–19, 8–10 in CAA play, to finish in tied for sixth place. They were defeated by Stony Brook in the first round of the CAA tournament. On April 10, it was announced that former Temple assistant and Delaware head coach Monté Ross was announced as the team's next head coach.

== Roster ==
2023–24 North Carolina A&T Aggies men's basketball team
Players
Coaches

Pos.	#	Name	Height	Weight	Year	Hometown
G	0	Kyle Duke	6 ft 4 in (1.93 m)	185 lb (84 kg)	Jr	Toronto, ON
F	1	Jeremy Robinson	6 ft 6 in (1.98 m)	215 lb (98 kg)	GS	Raleigh, NC
G	2	Qua Brown	6 ft 4 in (1.93 m)	200 lb (91 kg)	Fr	Covington, GA
G	3	Camian Shell	5 ft 10 in (1.78 m)	170 lb (77 kg)	So	Winston-Salem, NC
G	4	Nai Ashley-Emory	6 ft 2 in (1.88 m)	185 lb (84 kg)	Jr	Atlanta, GA
F	5	Evan Joyner	6 ft 8 in (2.03 m)	180 lb (82 kg)	RS So	Greensboro, NC
G	7	Landon Glasper	6 ft 2 in (1.88 m)	170 lb (77 kg)	So	Fayetteville, AR
G	10	Uchenna Kellman-Nicholes	6 ft 5 in (1.96 m)	180 lb (82 kg)	Fr	Orlando, FL
C	13	Jason Murphy	6 ft 9 in (2.06 m)	245 lb (111 kg)	Jr	Owings Mills, MD
G	15	Jalal McKie	6 ft 5 in (1.96 m)	195 lb (88 kg)	Fr	Atlanta, GA
F	16	Nikolaos Chitikoudis	6 ft 9 in (2.06 m)	215 lb (98 kg)	Fr	East Thessaloniki, Greece
G	21	Brayden Smith	6 ft 6 in (1.98 m)	210 lb (95 kg)	Fr	Lomita, CA
G	23	Ahmad Hamilton	6 ft 2 in (1.88 m)	170 lb (77 kg)	RS Jr	Durham, NC
G	25	Dantae Watson	6 ft 2 in (1.88 m)	195 lb (88 kg)	Jr	Winston-Salem, NC
G	30	Dylan Swift	5 ft 11 in (1.8 m)	170 lb (77 kg)	Fr	West Hartford, CT
G	33	Julius Reese	6 ft 3 in (1.91 m)	190 lb (86 kg)	Fr	Kernersville, NC
C	34	Will Felton	6 ft 9 in (2.06 m)	260 lb (118 kg)	RS So	Raleigh, NC
G	35	Jordan Martin	6 ft 1 in (1.85 m)	190 lb (86 kg)	So	Columbia, SC

Head coach

- Monté Ross (Winston-Salem State)

Assistant coach(es)

- Jeff Rafferty (Springfield)
- Dorian Long (Neumann)
- Ricky Moore (Connecticut)

Legend

- (C) Team captain
- (S) Suspended
- (I) Ineligible
- (W) Walk-on
- Injured
- Current redshirt

Roster
Last update: October 27, 2023

== Schedule and results ==
Date time, TV	Rank^{#}	Opponent^{#}	Result	Record	Site (attendance) city, state
Non-conference regular season
November 6, 2023*; 7:00 p.m., ACCNX		at Pittsburgh	L 52–100	0–1	Petersen Events Center (6,797); Pittsburgh, PA
November 10, 2023*; 7:00 p.m., ESPN+		at UNC Greensboro; Battle of Market Street	L 78–94	0–2	Greensboro Coliseum (3,132); Greensboro, NC
November 14, 2023*; 7:00 p.m., ACCNX		at Virginia	L 51–80	0–3	John Paul Jones Arena (12,905); Charlottesville, VA
November 22, 2023*; 5:30 p.m.		vs. Merrimack; Samford Tournament	L 73–96	0–4	Pete Hanna Center (331); Homewood, AL
November 24, 2023*; 2:00 p.m.		vs. Alabama State; Samford Tournament	L 73–88	0–5	Pete Hanna Center (373); Homewood, AL
November 25, 2023*; 3:00 p.m., ESPN+		at Samford; Samford Tournament	L 83–101	0–6	Pete Hanna Center (411); Homewood, AL
December 2, 2023*; 2:00 p.m., FloHoops		The Citadel	L 68–85	0–7	Corbett Sports Center (2,357); Greensboro, NC
December 8, 2023*; 7:00 p.m., ESPN+		at High Point	L 62–75	0–8	Qubein Center (3,512); High Point, NC
December 12, 2023*; 7:00 p.m., FloHoops		North Carolina Central; Rivalry	L 62–67	0–9	Corbett Sports Center (4,033); Greensboro, NC
December 16, 2023*; 9:30 p.m., ESPN+		vs. Texas Southern; CP3 HBCU Challenge	W 85–79	1–9	Michelob Ultra Arena; Paradise, NV
December 17, 2023*; 8:30 p.m., ESPN+		vs. Jackson State; CP3 HBCU Challenge	L 60–68	1–10	Michelob Ultra Arena; Paradise, NV
December 21, 2023*; 7:00 p.m., ESPN+		at Coastal Carolina	W 85–82	2–10	HTC Center (1,033); Conway, SC
December 30, 2023*; 2:00 p.m., ESPN+		at George Mason	L 69–94	2–11	EagleBank Arena (4,554); Fairfax, VA
CAA regular season
January 4, 2024; 7:00 p.m., FloHoops		Campbell	W 76–62	3–11 (1–0)	Corbett Sports Center (1,089); Greensboro, NC
January 6, 2024; 7:00 p.m., FloHoops		at Elon	L 59–77	3–12 (1–1)	Schar Center (2,281); Elon, NC
January 11, 2024; 7:00 p.m., FloHoops		Drexel	L 63–67	3–13 (1–2)	Corbett Sports Center (758); Greensboro, NC
January 15, 2024; 7:00 p.m., CBSSN		at Hampton	W 81–80	4–13 (2–2)	Hampton Convocation Center (3,020); Hampton, VA
January 18, 2024; 7:00 p.m., FloHoops		Northeastern	W 72–65	5–13 (3–2)	Corbett Sports Center (1,539); Greensboro, NC
January 20, 2024; 2:00 p.m., FloHoops		William & Mary	W 76–69	6–13 (4–2)	Corbett Sports Center (2,418); Greensboro, NC
January 25, 2024; 7:00 p.m., FloHoops		at Delaware	L 71–90	6–14 (4–3)	Bob Carpenter Center (1,661); Newark, DE
January 27, 2024; 2:00 p.m., FloHoops		at Drexel	L 47–62	6–15 (4–4)	Daskalakis Athletic Center (1,739); Philadelphia, PA
February 1, 2024; 7:00 p.m., FloHoops		Hampton	W 59–58	7–15 (5–4)	Corbett Sports Center (5,700); Greensboro, NC
February 3, 2024; 2:00 p.m., CBSSN		Elon	L 65–69	7–16 (5–5)	Corbett Sports Center (2,006); Greensboro, NC
February 8, 2024; 8:00 p.m., CBSSN		at Charleston	L 58–80	7–17 (5–6)	TD Arena (4,624); Charleston, SC
February 10, 2024; 2:00 p.m., FloHoops		Hofstra	L 49–81	7–18 (5–7)	Corbett Sports Center (1,054); Greensboro, NC
February 15, 2024; 7:00 p.m., FloHoops		at UNC Wilmington	L 54–73	7–19 (5–8)	Trask Coliseum (4,851); Wilmington, NC
February 17, 2024; 2:00 p.m., FloHoops		Delaware	L 54–62	7–20 (5–9)	Corbett Sports Center (1,293); Greensboro, NC
February 22, 2024; 6:30 p.m., FloHoops		at Stony Brook	L 64–80	7–21 (5–10)	Island Federal Arena (2,246); Stony Brook, NY
February 24, 2024; 2:00 p.m., FloHoops		at Monmouth	L 67–83	7–22 (5–11)	OceanFirst Bank Center (2,353); West Long Branch, NJ
February 29, 2024; 7:00 p.m., FloHoops		Towson	L 58–84	7–23 (5–12)	Corbett Sports Center (2,953); Greensboro, NC
March 2, 2024; 4:00 p.m., FloHoops		at Campbell	L 62–64	7–24 (5–13)	Gore Arena (1,547); Buies Creek, NC
CAA tournament
March 8, 2024; 2:00 p.m., FloHoops	(12)	vs. (13) William & Mary; First round	L 62–79	7–25	Entertainment and Sports Arena; Washington, D.C.
*Non-conference game. ^{#}Rankings from AP poll. (#) Tournament seedings in parentheses. All times are in Eastern.

== See also ==
- 2023–24 North Carolina A&T Aggies women's basketball team
