= 2023–24 Northeastern Huskies men's basketball team =

Basketball team season

2023–24 Northeastern Huskies men's basketball
- Conference: Coastal Athletic Association
- Record: 12–20 (7–11 CAA)
- Head coach: Bill Coen (18th season)
- Assistant coaches: Brian McDonald; Manny Adako; Joel Smith
- Home arena: Matthews Arena

2023–24 CAA men's basketball standings
	Conf.				Overall
Team	W		L	PCT	W		L	PCT
Charleston †	15	–	3	.833	27	–	8	.771
Drexel	13	–	5	.722	20	–	12	.625
Hofstra	12	–	6	.667	20	–	13	.606
UNC Wilmington	12	–	6	.667	21	–	10	.677
Towson	11	–	7	.611	20	–	14	.588
Delaware	10	–	8	.556	19	–	14	.576
Stony Brook	10	–	8	.556	20	–	15	.571
Monmouth	10	–	8	.556	18	–	15	.545
Campbell	8	–	10	.444	14	–	18	.438
Northeastern	7	–	11	.389	12	–	20	.375
Elon	6	–	12	.333	13	–	19	.406
North Carolina A&T	5	–	13	.278	7	–	25	.219
William & Mary	4	–	14	.222	10	–	23	.303
Hampton	3	–	15	.167	9	–	24	.273
† 2024 CAA tournament winner

The 2023–24 Northeastern Huskies men's basketball team represented Northeastern University during the 2023–24 NCAA Division I men's basketball season. The Huskies, led by 18th-year head coach Bill Coen, played their home games at Matthews Arena in Boston, Massachusetts, as members of the Coastal Athletic Association.

== Previous season ==
The Huskies finished the 2022–23 season 10–20, 6–12 in CAA play to finish in A three-way tie for ninth place. They lost in overtime to Delaware in the second round of the CAA tournament.

== Roster ==
2023–24 Northeastern Huskies men's basketball team
Players
Coaches

Pos.	#	Name	Height	Weight	Year	Previous school	Hometown
G	0	Joe Pridgen	6 ft 5 in (1.96 m)	227 lb (103 kg)	RS Sr	UNC Wilmington	Winchendon, Massachusetts
G	1	Masai Troutman	6 ft 6 in (1.98 m)	200 lb (91 kg)	So	St. Andrew's Episcopal School	Frederick, Maryland
G	2	Glen McClintock	6 ft 2 in (1.88 m)	196 lb (89 kg)	Sr	Air Force	Kansas City, Missouri
G/F	3	Kyle Squires	6 ft 8 in (2.03 m)	190 lb (86 kg)	So	Lafayette	Kingston, Massachusetts
G	4	Rashad King	6 ft 6 in (1.98 m)	198 lb (90 kg)	So	Evans High School	Evans, Georgia
G	8	William Kermoury	6 ft 5 in (1.96 m)	195 lb (88 kg)	Fr	Södertälje BBK	Stockholm, Sweden
G	9	Luka Sakota	6 ft 6 in (1.98 m)	198 lb (90 kg)	GS	Harvard	Etobicoke, Ontario
G	10	Harold Woods	6 ft 5 in (1.96 m)	201 lb (91 kg)	So	Don Bosco Prep	Hammond, Indiana
G	11	JB Frankel	6 ft 4 in (1.93 m)	190 lb (86 kg)	Fr	Brewster Academy	New York, New York
F	12	Alexander Nwagha	6 ft 8 in (2.03 m)	221 lb (100 kg)	Sr	Orangeville Prep	Milton, Ontario
G/F	13	Jared Turner	6 ft 8 in (2.03 m)	208 lb (94 kg)	So	Gonzaga College High School	Silver Spring, Maryland
F	21	Bryce Johnson	6 ft 6 in (1.98 m)	221 lb (100 kg)	GS	Sacred Heart	Stockton, California
F	33	Chris Doherty	6 ft 7 in (2.01 m)	236 lb (107 kg)	GS	Notre Dame	Marlborough, Massachusetts
C	45	Collin Metcalf	6 ft 9 in (2.06 m)	228 lb (103 kg)	So	Mercersburg Academy	Nortorf, Germany

Head coach

- Bill Coen (Hamilton)

Assistant coach(es)

- Brian McDonald (Northeastern)
- Manny Adako (Northeastern)
- Joel Smith (Northeastern)

Legend

- (C) Team captain
- (S) Suspended
- (I) Ineligible
- (W) Walk-on
- Injured
- Current redshirt

Roster
Last update: November 21, 2023

== Schedule and results ==
Date time, TV	Rank^{#}	Opponent^{#}	Result	Record	Site (attendance) city, state
Non-conference regular season
November 6, 2023*; 8:00 pm, NESN+/FloHoops		Boston University	W 67–58	1–0	Matthews Arena (2,336); Boston, MA
November 11, 2023*; 3:30 pm, ESPN+		at La Salle	L 74–79	1–1	Tom Gola Arena (2,871); Philadelphia, PA
November 14, 2023*; 7:00 pm, ESPN+		at Harvard	L 56–80	1–2	Lavietes Pavilion (946); Cambridge, MA
November 19, 2023*; 2:00 pm, ESPN+		at East Carolina; TowneBank Holiday Classic	W 82–76	2–2	Williams Arena (3,673); Greenville, NC
November 20, 2023*; 3:00 pm, ESPN+		vs. Kennesaw State; TowneBank Holiday Classic	L 77–79	2–3	Williams Arena (212); Greenville, NC
November 21, 2023*; 3:00 pm, ESPN+		vs. Georgia Southern; TowneBank Holiday Classic	W 93–76	3–3	Williams Arena (129); Greenville, NC
November 25, 2023*; 2:00 pm, ESPN+		at Princeton	L 66–80	3–4	Jadwin Gymnasium (2,470); Princeton, NJ
November 29, 2023*; 6:30 pm, FS2		at Seton Hall	L 75–88	3–5	Prudential Center (8,045); Newark, NJ
December 2, 2023*; 2:00 pm, NESN+/FloHoops		Old Dominion	W 81–68	4–5	Matthews Arena (1,033); Boston, MA
December 6, 2023*; 7:00 pm, NESN/FloHoops		Vermont	L 71–73	4–6	Matthews Arena (987); Boston, MA
December 16, 2023*; 6:00 pm, ACCN		at No. 22 Virginia	L 54–56	4–7	John Paul Jones Arena (13,676); Charlottesville, VA
December 19, 2023*; 7:00 p.m., NEC Front Row		at Central Connecticut	W 79–74	5–7	William H. Detrick Gymnasium (1,015); New Britain, CT
December 30, 2023*; 1:00 pm, ESPN+		at Rhode Island	L 71–82	5–8	Ryan Center (4,311); Kingston, RI
CAA regular season
January 4, 2024; 7:00 pm, CBSSN		Stony Brook	L 53–62	5–9 (0–1)	Matthews Arena (632); Boston, MA
January 8, 2024; 8:00 pm, CBSSN		at Monmouth	L 62–81	5–10 (0–2)	OceanFirst Bank Center (1,190); West Long Branch, NJ
January 11, 2024; 7:00 pm, CBSSN		Hofstra	W 71–68	6–10 (1–2)	Matthews Arena (972); Boston, MA
January 13, 2024; 2:00 pm, NESN/FloHoops		Towson	W 67–59	7–10 (2–2)	Matthews Arena (1,015); Boston, MA
January 18, 2024; 7:00 pm, FloHoops		at North Carolina A&T	L 65–72	7–11 (2–3)	Corbett Sports Center (1,539); Greensboro, NC
January 20, 2024; 7:00 pm, FloHoops		at Elon	W 84–72	8–11 (3–3)	Schar Center (2,068); Elon, NC
January 25, 2024; 7:00 pm, NESN+/FloHoops		UNC Wilmington	L 54–77	8–12 (3–4)	Matthews Arena (802); Boston, MA
January 27, 2024; 12:00 pm, NESN+/FloHoops		William & Mary	L 68–72	8–13 (3–5)	Matthews Arena (1,101); Boston, MA
February 1, 2024; 7:00 pm, FloHoops		at Towson	L 76–83	8–14 (3–6)	SECU Arena (1,950); Towson, MD
February 3, 2024; 6:30 pm, FloHoops		at Stony Brook	L 55–59	8–15 (3–7)	Island Federal Arena (3,610); Stony Brook, NY
February 8, 2024; 7:00 pm, FloHoops		at Campbell	W 86–76	9–15 (4–7)	Gore Arena (1,024); Buies Creek, NC
February 10, 2024; 1:00 pm, NESN+/FloHoops		Monmouth	W 77–65	10–15 (5–7)	Matthews Arena (801); Boston, MA
February 15, 2024; 7:00 pm, NESN+/FloHoops		Charleston	L 73–77	10–16 (5–8)	Matthews Arena (1,127); Boston, MA
February 17, 2024; 2:00 pm, FloHoops		at Hofstra	L 62–82	10–17 (5–9)	Mack Sports Complex (2,122); Hempstead, NY
February 22, 2024; 7:00 pm, NESN+/FloHoops		Elon	W 61–58	11–17 (6–9)	Matthews Arena (1,147); Boston, MA
February 24, 2024; 12:00 pm, NESN+/FloHoops		Hampton	W 70–62	12–17 (7–9)	Matthews Arena (1,128); Boston, MA
February 29, 2024; 7:00 pm, FloHoops		at Delaware	L 67–73	12–18 (7–10)	Bob Carpenter Center (1,798); Newark, DE
March 2, 2024; 2:00 pm, FloHoops		at Drexel	L 59–73	12–19 (7–11)	Daskalakis Athletic Center (2,007); Philadelphia, PA
CAA Tournament
March 9, 2024; 6:00 pm, FloHoops	(10)	vs. (7) Stony Brook; Second round	L 65-75	12-20	Entertainment and Sports Arena (1,752); Washington, D.C.
*Non-conference game. ^{#}Rankings from AP Poll. (#) Tournament seedings in parentheses. All times are in Eastern.
