= 2023–24 Hampton Pirates basketball team =

American college basketball season

2023–24 Hampton Pirates basketball
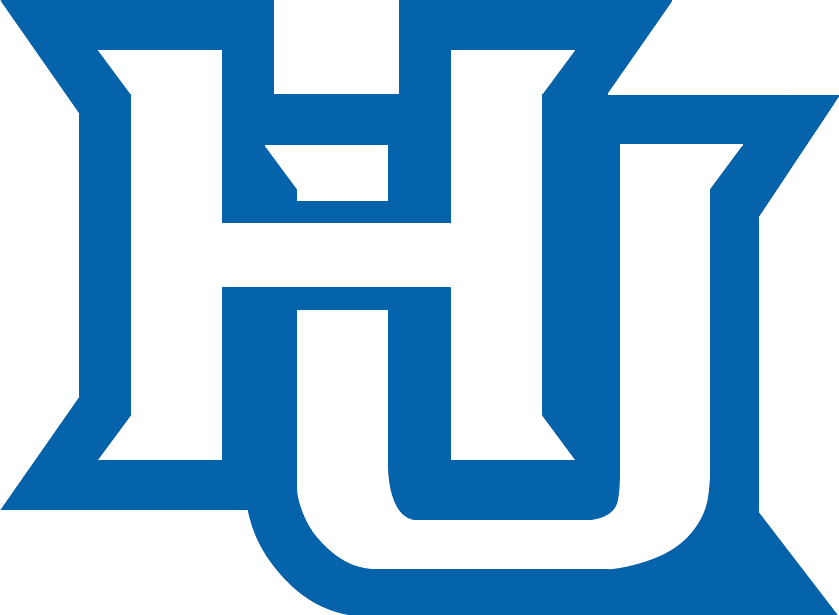
- Conference: Coastal Athletic Association
- Record: 9–24 (3–15 CAA)
- Head coach: Edward Joyner (15th season)
- Associate head coach: Darryl Sharp
- Assistant coaches: Matthew Hamilton; Derrick Wall
- Home arena: Hampton Convocation Center

2023–24 CAA men's basketball standings
	Conf.				Overall
Team	W		L	PCT	W		L	PCT
Charleston †	15	–	3	.833	27	–	8	.771
Drexel	13	–	5	.722	20	–	12	.625
Hofstra	12	–	6	.667	20	–	13	.606
UNC Wilmington	12	–	6	.667	21	–	10	.677
Towson	11	–	7	.611	20	–	14	.588
Delaware	10	–	8	.556	19	–	14	.576
Stony Brook	10	–	8	.556	20	–	15	.571
Monmouth	10	–	8	.556	18	–	15	.545
Campbell	8	–	10	.444	14	–	18	.438
Northeastern	7	–	11	.389	12	–	20	.375
Elon	6	–	12	.333	13	–	19	.406
North Carolina A&T	5	–	13	.278	7	–	25	.219
William & Mary	4	–	14	.222	10	–	23	.303
Hampton	3	–	15	.167	9	–	24	.273
† 2024 CAA tournament winner

The 2023–24 Hampton Pirates basketball team represented Hampton University during the 2023–24 NCAA Division I men's basketball season. The Pirates, led by 15th-year head coach Edward Joyner, played their home games at the Hampton Convocation Center in Hampton, Virginia as members of the Coastal Athletic Association (CAA).

The Pirates finished the season 9–24, 3–15 in CAA play, to finish in 14th (last) place. They upset Elon before falling to Delaware in the second round of the CAA tournament.

== Previous season ==
The Pirates finished the 2022–23 season 8–24, 5–13 in CAA play, to finish in tied for sixth place. They were defeated by Monmouth in the first round of the CAA tournament.

== Roster ==
2023–24 Hampton Pirates men's basketball team
Players
Coaches

Pos.	#	Name	Height	Weight	Year	Previous school	Hometown
G	0	Tedrick Jr. Wilcox	6 ft 6 in (1.98 m)	188 lb (85 kg)	GS	St. Francis Brooklyn	Pawtucket, RI
G	1	Tristan Maxwell	6 ft 3 in (1.91 m)	205 lb (93 kg)	Jr	Georgia Tech	Huntersville, NC
F	3	Kyrese Mullen	6 ft 7 in (2.01 m)	230 lb (104 kg)	So	Massanutten Military Academy	Norfolk, VA
F	4	Joshua Lusane	6 ft 7 in (2.01 m)	240 lb (109 kg)	GS	Campbell	Americus, GA
F/C	5	Donovan Raymond	6 ft 9 in (2.06 m)	210 lb (95 kg)	Fr	West Charlotte High School	Charlotte, NC
G	8	Jordan Nesbitt	6 ft 6 in (1.98 m)	210 lb (95 kg)	Jr	Saint Louis	St. Louis, MO
G	11	Amir Nesbitt	6 ft 1 in (1.85 m)	180 lb (82 kg)	Jr	Miller School	Newport News, VA
G	12	Quentin Livingston	6 ft 4 in (1.93 m)	185 lb (84 kg)	So	King's Fork High School	Suffolk, VA
G	13	Tre Thomas	6 ft 2 in (1.88 m)	185 lb (84 kg)	So	Spire Institute	Washington, D.C.
F	15	Jerry Deng	6 ft 9 in (2.06 m)	220 lb (100 kg)	Fr	Norcross High School	Norcross, GA
G	20	Tyler Chatman	6 ft 3 in (1.91 m)	180 lb (82 kg)	Sr	King's Fork High School	Suffolk, VA
F	21	Ja'Von Benson	6 ft 8 in (2.03 m)	253 lb (115 kg)	Jr	South Carolina	Columbia, SC
G	23	Dan Jr. Banister	6 ft 6 in (1.98 m)	190 lb (86 kg)	Sr	Cape Henry Collegiate School	Chesapeake, VA
G	24	Ford Cooper	6 ft 3 in (1.91 m)	202 lb (92 kg)	GS	South Carolina	Charlotte, NC
F	34	Will Henderson	6 ft 9 in (2.06 m)	210 lb (95 kg)	So	Life Christian Academy	Richmond, VA

Head coach

- Edward Joyner (Hampton)

Assistant coach(es)

- Darryl Sharp (Bloomsburg)
- Matthew Hamilton (Appalachian State)
- Derrick Wall (UNC Pembroke)

Legend

- (C) Team captain
- (S) Suspended
- (I) Ineligible
- (W) Walk-on
- Injured
- Current redshirt

Roster
Last update: November 7, 2023

== Schedule and results ==
Date time, TV	Rank^{#}	Opponent^{#}	Result	Record	Site (attendance) city, state
Non-conference regular season
November 6, 2023*; 7:00 p.m., ESPN+		at Howard; The Real HU	L 80–92	0–1	Burr Gymnasium (2,500); Washington, D.C.
November 9, 2023*; 7:00 p.m., FloHoops		Mid-Atlantic Christian	W 109–46	1–1	Hampton Convocation Center (2,210); Hampton, VA
November 13, 2023*; 7:00 p.m.		at Norfolk State; Battle of the Bay	L 68–75	1–2	Joseph G. Echols Memorial Hall (4,500); Norfolk, VA
November 17, 2023*; 6:00 p.m., ESPN+		vs. Kent State; Paradise Jam first round	L 62–100	1–3	Sports and Fitness Center; St. Thomas, USVI
November 18, 2023*; 5:45 p.m., ESPN+		vs. Florida Gulf Coast; Paradise Jam consolation 2nd round	W 92–85	2–3	Sports and Fitness Center (1,024); St. Thomas, USVI
November 20, 2023*; 3:15 p.m., ESPN+		vs. San Jose State; Paradise Jam 5th-place game	L 52–71	2–4	Sports and Fitness Center (376); St. Thomas, USVI
November 27, 2023*; 7:00 p.m., FloHoops		UMBC	L 76–80	2–5	Hampton Convocation Center (1,002); Hampton, VA
December 1, 2023*; 8:00 p.m., FloHoops		at Maryland Eastern Shore	Cancelled		Hytche Athletic Center; Princess Anne, MD
December 3, 2023*; 3:00 p.m., FloHoops		Virginia–Lynchburg	W 121–66	3–5	Hampton Convocation Center (477); Hampton, VA
December 11, 2023*; 7:00 p.m., FloHoops		Mary Baldwin	W 100–53	4–5	Hampton Convocation Center (460); Hampton, VA
December 16, 2023*; 2:00 p.m., FloHoops		No. 20 James Madison	L 71–88	4–6	Hampton Convocation Center (2,068); Hampton, VA
December 19, 2023*; 11:00 a.m., ESPN+		at Bowling Green	L 65–75	4–7	Stroh Center (2,995); Bowling Green, OH
December 21, 2023*; 1:00 p.m., ESPN+		at Eastern Michigan	L 69–72	4–8	George Gervin GameAbove Center (1,870); Ypsilanti, MI
CAA regular season
January 1, 2024; 12:00 p.m., CBSSN		at Drexel	L 65–99	4–9 (0–1)	Daskalakis Athletic Center (1,123); Philadelphia, PA
January 4, 2024; 7:00 p.m., FloHoops		at Delaware	L 53–80	4–10 (0–2)	Bob Carpenter Center (1,824); Newark, DE
January 6, 2024; 2:00 p.m., FloHoops		Campbell	L 69–80	4–11 (0–3)	Hampton Convocation Center (537); Hampton, VA
January 11, 2024; 7:00 p.m., FloHoops		William & Mary	L 61–73	4–12 (0–4)	Hampton Convocation Center (1,372); Hampton, VA
January 15, 2024; 9:00 p.m., CBSSN		North Carolina A&T	L 80–81	4–13 (0–5)	Hampton Convocation Center (3,020); Hampton, VA
January 18, 2024; 7:00 p.m., FloHoops		at Hofstra	L 77–86	4–14 (0–6)	Mack Sports Complex (1,244); Hempstead, NY
January 20, 2024; 2:00 p.m., FloHoops		at Monmouth	L 77–85	4–15 (0–7)	OceanFirst Bank Center (2,440); West Long Branch, NJ
January 25, 2024; 7:00 p.m., FloHoops		Charleston	L 86–107	4–16 (0–8)	Hampton Convocation Center (897); Hampton, VA
January 27, 2024; 2:00 p.m., FloHoops		Elon	L 74–80	4–17 (0–9)	Hampton Convocation Center (1,122); Hampton, VA
February 1, 2024; 7:00 p.m., FloHoops		at North Carolina A&T	L 58–59	4–18 (0–10)	Corbett Sports Center (5,700); Greensboro, NC
February 3, 2024*; 4:00 p.m., TNT		vs. Howard; Invesco QQQ Legacy Classic	W 63–61	5–18	Prudential Center (13,834); Newark, NJ
February 8, 2024; 7:00 p.m., FloHoops		Hofstra	L 59–63	5–19 (0–11)	Hampton Convocation Center (1,004); Hampton, VA
February 10, 2024; 2:00 p.m., FloHoops		UNC Wilmington	L 65–95	5–20 (0–12)	Hampton Convocation Center (1,949); Hampton, VA
February 15, 2024; 6:31 p.m., FloHoops		at Stony Brook	L 73–93	5–21 (0–13)	Island Federal Arena (2,031); Stony Brook, NY
February 17, 2024; 2:00 p.m., FloHoops		Towson	W 67–61	6–21 (1–13)	Hampton Convocation Center (2,421); Hampton, VA
February 22, 2024; 7:00 p.m., FloHoops		at Campbell	W 72–68	7–21 (2–13)	Gore Arena (1,109); Buies Creek, NC
February 24, 2024; 12:00 p.m., FloHoops		at Northeastern	L 62–70	7–22 (2–14)	Matthews Arena (1,128); Boston, MA
February 29, 2024; 7:00 p.m., FloHoops		Monmouth	W 64–56	8–22 (3–14)	Hampton Convocation Center (1,008); Hampton, VA
March 2, 2024; 2:00 p.m., FloHoops		at William & Mary	L 73–85	8–23 (3–15)	Kaplan Arena (3,916); Williamsburg, VA
CAA tournament
March 8, 2024; 4:30 p.m., FloHoops	(14)	vs. (11) Elon; First round	W 56–55	9–23	Entertainment and Sports Arena (1,706); Washington, D.C.
March 9, 2024; 8:30 p.m., FloHoops	(14)	vs. (6) Delaware; Second round	L 50–80	9–24	Entertainment and Sports Arena (1,752); Washington, D.C.
*Non-conference game. ^{#}Rankings from AP poll. (#) Tournament seedings in parentheses. All times are in Eastern.
