= Reyne Smith =

Australian basketball player (born 2002)

No. 2 – Cairns Taipans
- Position: Shooting guard
- League: NBL

Personal information
- Born: 28 October 2002 (age 24) Ulverstone, Tasmania, Australia
- Listed height: 6 ft 2 in (1.88 m)
- Listed weight: 190 lb (86 kg)

Career information
- College: Charleston (2021–2024); Louisville (2024–2025)
- NBA draft: 2025: undrafted
- Playing career: 2019–present

Career history
- 2019: North-West Tasmania Thunder
- 2020–2021: BA Centre of Excellence
- 2025–present: Cairns Taipans
- 2026: Maitland Mustangs

Career highlights
- Second-team All-CAA (2024); CAA All-Rookie Team (2022); CAA tournament MVP (2024)
Medals
Men's basketball
Representing Australia
FIBA Asia Cup
Gold medal – first place	2025 Saudi Arabia
FIBA Oceania Under-17 Championship
Gold medal – first place	2019 New Caledonia	Team

Reyne Smith (born 28 October 2002) is an Australian professional basketball player for the Cairns Taipans of the National Basketball League (NBL). He played college basketball for the Charleston Cougars and Louisville Cardinals.

== Early life ==
Smith hails from Ulverstone, Tasmania. In 2019, he played for the North-West Tasmania Thunder of the NBL1 in the inaugural NBL1 season. He went on to attend the Australian Institute of Sport (AIS) in Canberra, where he played for the BA Centre of Excellence in the Waratah League in 2020 and 2021.

== College career ==
=== Charleston ===
==== Freshman year ====
Smith began his college basketball career with the Charleston Cougars. He set the new school record for three's recorded by a freshman with 90 on the season, surpassing Andrew Goudelock's record of 74 on 22 February 2022, against Northeastern. He averaged 12.1 points, 1.4 assists, and 2.3 rebounds in 32 games and was named to the CAA All-Freshman team.

==== Sophomore year ====
In Smith's sophomore season the 2022–23 Charleston Cougars won 31 games before qualifying for the 2023 NCAA tournament, a record for the school's Division I era. On 14 November 2022, he tied Charleston's single game three-point record with 8 in an overtime game against Richmond, also scoring a career-high 29 points. Smith's personal 14–0 run against Towson in the CAA Tournament Semifinals was instrumental in the team's eventual Championship victory against UNC Wilmington. He finished the regular season with a turnover percentage of 5.8, good for the sixth best in Division I basketball that year. Overall Smith averaged 10.8 points, 1.3 assists, and 2.0 rebounds in 35 games. He scored 7 points against National-Runner Up San Diego State in the first round of the NCAA Tournament.

==== Junior year ====
Coming in to the season, Smith was named to the All-CAA Preseason Second Team. He recorded his 200th career three-pointer on 2 December 2023, against Florida Atlantic, and scored a new career-high 31 points against Saint Joseph's on 21 December. That same evening Smith set a new school record for the most three's in a single game, scoring nine, and he later broke both records by scoring 32 points on 10 three's against Campbell on 29 February 2024. He recorded his 1,000th career point against UNC Wilmington on 1 February and finished the season with 294 career-three's, the second most in school history. His 112 made-three's were the ninth most made by a player in Division I that season. He was named to the postseason All-CAA Second Team after averaging 12.8 points, 1.7 assists, and 2.1 rebounds in 35 games.

Smith earned the title of CAA Tournament MVP and a spot on the All-Tournament team after leading the 2023–24 Charleston Cougars through the postseason. His 16 points in the semifinals against Towson led the Cougars to a championship matchup against Stony Brook, where Smith's 23 points and last second steal brought the game into overtime. In the final five minutes, Smith went on a personal 6–3 run ensuring victory against the Seawolves. He scored 13 points against Final Four team Alabama in the first round of the 2024 NCAA Tournament.

=== Louisville ===
==== Senior year ====
Smith announced on 30 March 2024, that he would be following Charleston's head coach Pat Kelsey to the Louisville Cardinals for the 2024–25 season.

On 23 December 2024, Smith was named ACC Player of the Week after putting up a season-high 27 points in a victory over Florida State. One month later he broke Louisville's record for the most 3-pointers made in a single game with 10, tying his career-high and setting the new school record in a victory at SMU on 21 January 2025. Smith suffered a high-ankle sprain during a win against California on 5 March 2025, causing him to miss the final game of the regular season, and all three games of the 2025 ACC Tournament. He returned to play against Creighton in the first round of the NCAA Tournament, where he put up 5 points before reinjuring his ankle, effectively ending his season.

Across 31 games, Smith averaged a career-high 13.1 points, 2.8 rebounds, and 1.3 assists per game. He led the ACC and ranked third nationally with 3.5 three-pointers per game, and his 107 made three-point shots are the second most ever made by a Louisville player in one season.

== Professional career ==
After going undrafted in the 2025 NBA draft, Smith played for the Denver Nuggets and the Washington Wizards during the 2025 NBA Summer League.

On 13 August 2025, Smith signed a two-year deal with the Cairns Taipans of the National Basketball League (NBL), with the second year being a club option. He missed much of the 2025–26 season with a plantar fascia tear that sidelined him between round seven and round 21.

Smith joined the Maitland Mustangs of the NBL1 East for the 2026 NBL1 season. On 9 May 2026, he scored 43 points and made 12 3-pointers against the Albury Wodonga Bandits.

On 13 April 2026, the Taipans exercised the club option on Smith's contract for the 2026–27 NBL season.

== National team career ==
Smith represented the Australia under-17 team at the 2019 FIBA Under-17 Oceania Championship in New Caledonia, winning the gold medal while averaging 11.6 points across five games. He later represented the Australia under-19 team at the 2021 FIBA U19 World Cup, averaging 7.1 points per game with a 19-point performance against Puerto Rico.

In July 2025, Smith was named in the Australian Boomers squad in the lead up to the 2025 FIBA Asia Cup in Saudi Arabia, and was later named in the final squad for the tournament. Smith averaged 9.0 points and 3.2 rebounds per game across five games to help Australia win their third gold medal in a row.

In February 2026, Smith was named in the Boomers squad for two FIBA World Cup Asian qualifiers. In June 2026, he was named as a replacement player for the next qualifier window. In November 2026, he was named in the squad for two more Asian qualifiers.

== Career statistics ==
Legend
GP	Games played	GS	Games started	MPG	Minutes per game
FG%	Field goal percentage	3P%	3-point field goal percentage	FT%	Free throw percentage
RPG	Rebounds per game	APG	Assists per game	SPG	Steals per game
BPG	Blocks per game	PPG	Points per game	**Bold**	Career high

=== College ===
Year	Team	GP	GS	MPG	FG%	3P%	FT%	RPG	APG	SPG	BPG	PPG
2021–22	Charleston	32	27	27.6	.377	.375	.929	2.3	1.4	**0.8**	0.0	12.1
2022–23	Charleston	**35**	**34**	24.7	.349	.341	.901	2.0	1.3	0.7	0.0	10.8
2023–24	Charleston	**35**	28	25.9	**.410**	**.394**	.855	2.1	**1.7**	0.5	**0.1**	12.8
2024–25	Louisville	31	18	**30.4**	.391	.379	**.944**	**2.8**	0.8	0.6	**0.1**	**13.1**
Career		133	107	27.0	.382	.373	.904	2.3	1.3	0.7	0.1	12.2
