= 2024 CAA men's basketball tournament =

U.S. collegiate basketball event

- Classification: Division I
- Season: 2023–24
- Teams: 14
- Site: Entertainment and Sports Arena; Washington, D.C.
- Champions: Charleston (3rd title)
- Winning coach: Pat Kelsey (2nd title)
- MVP: Reyne Smith (Charleston)
- Attendance: 12,876 (total); 1,954 (championship)
- Television: FloHoops, CBSSN

2023–24 CAA men's basketball standings
	Conf.				Overall
Team	W		L	PCT	W		L	PCT
Charleston †	15	–	3	.833	27	–	8	.771
Drexel	13	–	5	.722	20	–	12	.625
Hofstra	12	–	6	.667	20	–	13	.606
UNC Wilmington	12	–	6	.667	21	–	10	.677
Towson	11	–	7	.611	20	–	14	.588
Delaware	10	–	8	.556	19	–	14	.576
Stony Brook	10	–	8	.556	20	–	15	.571
Monmouth	10	–	8	.556	18	–	15	.545
Campbell	8	–	10	.444	14	–	18	.438
Northeastern	7	–	11	.389	12	–	20	.375
Elon	6	–	12	.333	13	–	19	.406
North Carolina A&T	5	–	13	.278	7	–	25	.219
William & Mary	4	–	14	.222	10	–	23	.303
Hampton	3	–	15	.167	9	–	24	.273
† 2024 CAA tournament winner

The 2024 Coastal Athletic Association men's basketball tournament was the postseason men's college basketball tournament for the Coastal Athletic Association for the 2023–24 NCAA Division I men's basketball season. The tournament was held March 8–12, 2024, at the Entertainment and Sports Arena in Washington, D.C. The winner, Charleston, received the conference's automatic bid to the 2024 NCAA tournament.

This was the first men's basketball tournament held under the Coastal Athletic Association name.

== Seeds ==
All 14 CAA teams will participate in the tournament. Teams will be seeded by record within the conference, with a tiebreaker system to seed teams with identical conference records. The top 10 teams will receive a first round bye and the top four teams will receive a double bye, automatically advancing them into the quarterfinals.

Seed	School	Conf.	Tiebreaker
1	Charleston	15–3	
2	Drexel	13–5	
3	Hofstra	12–6	1–0 vs. UNCW
4	UNC Wilmington	12–6	0–1 vs. Hofstra
5	Towson	11–7	
6	Delaware	10–8	2–1 vs. Stony Brook/Monmouth
7	Stony Brook	10–8	2–2 vs. Delaware/Monmouth
8	Monmouth	10–8	1–2 vs. Delaware/Stony Brook
9	Campbell	8–10	
10	Northeastern	7–11	
11	Elon	6–12	
12	North Carolina A&T	5–13	
13	William & Mary	4–14	
14	Hampton	3–15	

== Schedule ==
Session	Game	Time*	Matchup	Score	Television	Attendance
First Round – Friday, March 8
1	1	2:00 pm	No. 12 North Carolina A&T vs. No. 13 William & Mary	62–79	FloHoops	1,706
1	2	4:30 pm	No. 11 Elon vs. No. 14 Hampton	55–56	FloHoops	1,706
Second Round – Saturday, March 9
2	3	12:00 pm	No. 8 Monmouth vs. No. 9 Campbell	90–67	FloHoops	1,883
2	4	2:30 pm	No. 5 Towson vs. No. 13 William & Mary	67–56	FloHoops	1,883
3	5	6:00 pm	No. 7 Stony Brook vs. No. 10 Northeastern	75–65	FloHoops	1,752
3	6	8:30 pm	No. 6 Delaware vs. No. 14 Hampton	80–50	FloHoops	1,752
Quarterfinals – Sunday, March 10
4	7	12:00 pm	No. 1 Charleston vs. No. 8 Monmouth	83–59	FloHoops	2,108
4	8	2:30 pm	No. 4 UNC Wilmington vs. No. 5 Towson	66–56	FloHoops	2,108
5	9	6:00 pm	No. 2 Drexel vs. No. 7 Stony Brook	91–88^{2OT}	FloHoops	1,688
5	10	8:30 pm	No. 3 Hofstra vs. No. 6 Delaware	73–58	FloHoops	1,688
Semifinals – Monday, March 11
6	11	6:00 pm	No. 1 Charleston vs. No. 5 Towson	61–56	CBSSN	1,785
6	12	8:30 pm	No. 7 Stony Brook vs. No. 3 Hofstra	63–59	CBSSN	1,785
Championship – Tuesday, March 12
7	13	7:00 pm	No. 1 Charleston vs. No. 7 Stony Brook	82–79^{OT}	CBSSN	1,954
*Game times in ET. Rankings denote tournament seed						

== Bracket ==
First Round; Friday, March 8 FloHoops
12	North Carolina A&T	62
13	William & Mary	79
11	Elon	55
14	Hampton	56

Second Round; Saturday, March 9 FloHoops
8	Monmouth	90
9	Campbell	67
5	Towson	67
13	William & Mary	56
7	Stony Brook	75
10	Northeastern	65
6	Delaware	80
14	Hampton	50

Quarterfinals; Sunday, March 10; FloHoops
1	Charleston	83
8	Monmouth	59
4	UNC Wilmington	56
5	Towson	66
2	Drexel	88
7	Stony Brook	91**
3	Hofstra	73
6	Delaware	58

Semifinals; Monday, March 11; CBS Sports Network
1	Charleston	61
5	Towson	56
7	Stony Brook	63
3	Hofstra	59

Championship; Tuesday, March 12; CBS Sports Network
1	Charleston	82*
7	Stony Brook	79

* denotes number of overtime periods

== Honors ==
CAA All-Tournament Team	Player	School
CAA All-Tournament Team	Reyne Smith (MVP)	Charleston
CAA All-Tournament Team	Frankie Policelli	Charleston
CAA All-Tournament Team	Kobe Rodgers	Charleston
CAA All-Tournament Team	Keenan Fitzmorris	Stony Brook
CAA All-Tournament Team	Tyler Stephenson-Moore	Stony Brook
CAA All-Tournament Team	Tyler Thomas	Hofstra

== See also ==
- 2024 CAA women's basketball tournament
