= 2023–24 Stony Brook Seawolves men's basketball team =

American college basketball season

2023–24 Stony Brook Seawolves men's basketball
- Conference: Coastal Athletic Association
- Record: 20–15 (10–8 CAA)
- Head coach: Geno Ford (5th season)
- Associate head coach: Dan Rickard
- Assistant coaches: Jalen Avery; Jaden Uken
- Home arena: Island Federal Arena

2023–24 CAA men's basketball standings
	Conf.				Overall
Team	W		L	PCT	W		L	PCT
Charleston †	15	–	3	.833	27	–	8	.771
Drexel	13	–	5	.722	20	–	12	.625
Hofstra	12	–	6	.667	20	–	13	.606
UNC Wilmington	12	–	6	.667	21	–	10	.677
Towson	11	–	7	.611	20	–	14	.588
Delaware	10	–	8	.556	19	–	14	.576
Stony Brook	10	–	8	.556	20	–	15	.571
Monmouth	10	–	8	.556	18	–	15	.545
Campbell	8	–	10	.444	14	–	18	.438
Northeastern	7	–	11	.389	12	–	20	.375
Elon	6	–	12	.333	13	–	19	.406
North Carolina A&T	5	–	13	.278	7	–	25	.219
William & Mary	4	–	14	.222	10	–	23	.303
Hampton	3	–	15	.167	9	–	24	.273
† 2024 CAA tournament winner

The 2023–24 Stony Brook Seawolves men's basketball team represented Stony Brook University during the 2023–24 NCAA Division I men's basketball season. The Seawolves, led by fifth-year head coach Geno Ford, played their home games at the Island Federal Arena located in Stony Brook, New York as second-year members of the Coastal Athletic Association.

== Previous season ==
The Seawolves finished the 2022–23 season 10–21, 6–12 in CAA play to finish in a three-way tie for ninth place. In the CAA tournament, they defeated North Carolina A&T in the second round, before falling to Charleston in the quarterfinals.

== Roster ==
2023–24 Stony Brook Seawolves men's basketball team
Players
Coaches

Pos.	#	Name	Height	Weight	Year	Previous school	Hometown
G	1	Sabry Philip	6 ft 4 in (1.93 m)	205 lb (93 kg)	GS	Navarro College	Edmonton, Alberta
G	3	Toby Onyekonwu	6 ft 1 in (1.85 m)	170 lb (77 kg)	So	Joliet West HS	Joliet, Illinois
F	4	Chris Maidoh	6 ft 10 in (2.08 m)	223 lb (101 kg)	GS	Fairfield	New Carrollton, Maryland
G	5	Aaron Clarke	6 ft 1 in (1.85 m)	193 lb (88 kg)	GS	Sacred Heart	Parsippany, New Jersey
G	11	Ra'Sean Frederick	6 ft 5 in (1.96 m)	228 lb (103 kg)	RS So	Hutchinson CC	Atlanta, Georgia
G/F	12	Peyton Frey	6 ft 6 in (1.98 m)	210 lb (95 kg)	Fr	Davidson HS	Columbus, Ohio
G	13	Dean Noll	6 ft 2 in (1.88 m)	187 lb (85 kg)	GS	Cornell	Medford, New Jersey
G	14	Tyler Stephenson-Moore	6 ft 3 in (1.91 m)	195 lb (88 kg)	GS	Long Island Lutheran HS	Jamaica, New York
G/F	21	Andre Snoddy	6 ft 6 in (1.98 m)	223 lb (101 kg)	Jr	Central Connecticut	Melville, New York
G	23	Kaiden Space	6 ft 0 in (1.83 m)	180 lb (82 kg)	Fr	Simeon Career Academy	Chicago, Illinois
G	24	Jared Frey	6 ft 4 in (1.93 m)	190 lb (86 kg)	So	Andrews Osborne Academy	Columbus, Ohio
C	32	Keenan Fitzmorris	7 ft 0 in (2.13 m)	250 lb (113 kg)	GS	Stanford	Overland Park, Kansas
F	33	Leon Nahar	6 ft 10 in (2.08 m)	218 lb (99 kg)	So	Asheville School	Alkmaar, Netherlands
C	34	Rocco Muratori	7 ft 3 in (2.21 m)	275 lb (125 kg)	So	IMG Academy	West Lafayette, Indiana

Head coach

- Geno Ford (Ohio)

Assistant coach(es)

- Dan Rickard (Stony Brook)
- Jalen Avery (Kent State)
- Jaden Uken (Nebraska)

Legend

- (C) Team captain
- (S) Suspended
- (I) Ineligible
- (W) Walk-on
- Injured
- Current redshirt

Roster
Last update: November 19, 2023

== Schedule and results ==
Date time, TV	Rank^{#}	Opponent^{#}	Result	Record	Site (attendance) city, state
Non-conference regular season
November 7, 2023*; 7:00 pm, FS1		at St. John's	L 74–90	0–1	Carnesecca Arena (5,602); Queens, NY
November 10, 2023*; 6:31 pm, SNY/FloHoops		St. Joseph's–Long Island	W 91–50	1–1	Island Federal Arena (2,741); Stony Brook, NY
November 13, 2023*; 7:00 pm, ESPN+		at Duquesne; Cornhusker Classic	L 63–85	1–2	UPMC Cooper Fieldhouse; Pittsburgh, PA
November 15, 2023*; 8:00 pm, B1G+		at Nebraska; Cornhusker Classic	L 63–84	1–3	Pinnacle Bank Arena (13,614); Lincoln, NE
November 20, 2023*; 6:31 pm, FloHoops		Rider; Cornhusker Classic	W 55–48	2–3	Island Federal Arena (1,689); Stony Brook, NY
November 29, 2023*; 7:00 pm, ESPN+		at Yale	L 71–79	2–4	John J. Lee Amphitheater (629); New Haven, CT
December 2, 2023*; 3:30 pm, SNY/FloHoops		Wagner	L 59–60	2–5	Island Federal Arena (1,765); Stony Brook, NY
December 6, 2023*; 6:31 pm, FloHoops		Stonehill	W 81–62	3–5	Island Federal Arena (1,592); Stony Brook, NY
December 9, 2023*; 6:31 pm, SNY/FloHoops		Bryant	W 86–75	4–5	Island Federal Arena (2,225); Stony Brook, NY
December 13, 2023*; 6:31 pm, FloHoops		Norfolk State	W 84–78	5–5	Island Federal Arena (1,812); Stony Brook, NY
December 17, 2023*; 1:00 pm, ESPN+		at Army	W 78–74 ^{OT}	6–5	Christl Arena (854); West Point, NY
December 21, 2023*; 6:30 pm, B1G+		at Michigan State	L 55–99	6–6	Breslin Center (14,797); East Lansing, MI
December 29, 2023*; 6:31 pm, FloHoops		Brown	W 69–65	7–6	Island Federal Arena (2,429); Stony Brook, NY
CAA regular season
January 4, 2024; 7:00 pm, CBSSN		at Northeastern	W 62–53	8–6 (1–0)	Matthews Arena (632); Boston, MA
January 6, 2024; 6:31 pm, SNY/FloHoops		Charleston	L 87–93	8–7 (1–1)	Island Federal Arena (2,416); Stony Brook, NY
January 11, 2024; 7:00 pm, FloHoops		at Towson	L 64–73 ^{OT}	8–8 (1–2)	SECU Arena (1,025); Towson, MD
January 13, 2024; 1:00 pm, FloHoops		at William & Mary	W 63–59	9–8 (2–2)	Kaplan Arena (2,886); Williamsburg, VA
January 18, 2024; 7:00 pm, FloHoops		at Delaware	L 68–71	9–9 (2–3)	Bob Carpenter Center (1,747); Newark, DE
January 22, 2024; 9:00 pm, CBSSN		Hofstra	L 74–80	9–10 (2–4)	Island Federal Arena (3,027); Stony Brook, NY
January 25, 2024; 6:31 pm, SNY/FloHoops		Monmouth	W 72–65	10–10 (3–4)	Island Federal Arena (1,905); Stony Brook, NY
January 27, 2024; 4:00 pm, CBSSN		UNC Wilmington	W 86–78	11–10 (4–4)	Island Federal Arena (2,871); Stony Brook, NY
February 1, 2024; 7:00 pm, MSGSN/FloHoops		at Hofstra	L 71–72	11–11 (4–5)	Mack Sports Complex (2,062); Hempstead, NY
February 3, 2024; 6:31 pm, SNY/FloHoops		Northeastern	W 59–55	12–11 (5–5)	Island Federal Arena (3,610); Stony Brook, NY
February 8, 2024; 7:00 pm, FloHoops		at Elon	W 79–64	13–11 (6–5)	Schar Center (2,045); Elon, NC
February 10, 2024; 2:00 pm, FloHoops		at Campbell	L 77–95	13–12 (6–6)	Gore Arena (1,742); Buies Creek, NC
February 15, 2024; 6:31 pm, SNY/FloHoops		Hampton	W 93–73	14–12 (7–6)	Island Federal Arena (2,031); Stony Brook, NY
February 17, 2024; 4:00 pm, SNY/FloHoops		at Monmouth	L 61–84	14–13 (7–7)	OceanFirst Bank Center (2,511); West Long Branch, NJ
February 22, 2024; 6:31 pm, SNY/FloHoops		North Carolina A&T	W 80–64	15–13 (8–7)	Island Federal Arena (2,246); Stony Brook, NY
February 24, 2024; 4:00 pm, SNY/FloHoops		William & Mary	W 75–62	16–13 (9–7)	Island Federal Arena (2,340); Stony Brook, NY
February 29, 2024; 7:00 pm, SNY/FloHoops		at Drexel	L 86–90	16–14 (9–8)	Daskalakis Athletic Center (1,467); Philadelphia, PA
March 2, 2024; 4:00 pm, SNY/FloHoops		Delaware	W 79–56	17–14 (10–8)	Island Federal Arena (2,961); Stony Brook, NY
CAA Tournament
March 9, 2024; 6:00 pm, FloHoops	(7)	vs. (10) Northeastern; Second round	W 75–65	18–14	Entertainment and Sports Arena (1,752); Washington, D.C.
March 10, 2024; 6:00 pm, FloHoops	(7)	vs. (2) Drexel; Quarterfinals	W 91–88 ^{2OT}	19–14	Entertainment and Sports Arena; Washington, D.C.
March 11, 2024; 8:30 pm, CBSSN	(7)	vs. (3) Hofstra; Semifinals	W 63–59	20–14	Entertainment and Sports Arena (1,785); Washington, D.C.
March 12, 2024; 7:00 pm, CBSSN	(7)	vs. (1) Charleston; Championship	L 79–82 ^{OT}	20–15	Entertainment and Sports Arena (1,954); Washington, D.C.
*Non-conference game. ^{#}Rankings from AP Poll. (#) Tournament seedings in parentheses. All times are in Eastern.
