= 2023–24 UNC Wilmington Seahawks men's basketball team =

American college basketball season

2023–24 UNC Wilmington Seahawks men's basketball
- Conference: Coastal Athletic Association
- Record: 21–10 (12–6 CAA)
- Head coach: Takayo Siddle (4th season)
- Associate head coach: Kurt Kanaskie
- Assistant coaches: Craig Ponder; Paul Hemrick; Hunter Henderson; Austin Parker
- Home arena: Trask Coliseum

2023–24 CAA men's basketball standings
| | Conf. | | | | Overall |
| Team | W | | L | PCT | W | | L | PCT |
|---|---|---|---|---|---|---|---|---|
| Charleston † | 15 | – | 3 | .833 | 27 | – | 8 | .771 |
| Drexel | 13 | – | 5 | .722 | 20 | – | 12 | .625 |
| Hofstra | 12 | – | 6 | .667 | 20 | – | 13 | .606 |
| UNC Wilmington | 12 | – | 6 | .667 | 21 | – | 10 | .677 |
| Towson | 11 | – | 7 | .611 | 20 | – | 14 | .588 |
| Delaware | 10 | – | 8 | .556 | 19 | – | 14 | .576 |
| Stony Brook | 10 | – | 8 | .556 | 20 | – | 15 | .571 |
| Monmouth | 10 | – | 8 | .556 | 18 | – | 15 | .545 |
| Campbell | 8 | – | 10 | .444 | 14 | – | 18 | .438 |
| Northeastern | 7 | – | 11 | .389 | 12 | – | 20 | .375 |
| Elon | 6 | – | 12 | .333 | 13 | – | 19 | .406 |
| North Carolina A&T | 5 | – | 13 | .278 | 7 | – | 25 | .219 |
| William & Mary | 4 | – | 14 | .222 | 10 | – | 23 | .303 |
| Hampton | 3 | – | 15 | .167 | 9 | – | 24 | .273 |
† 2024 CAA tournament winner

The 2023–24 UNC Wilmington Seahawks men's basketball team represented the University of North Carolina Wilmington during the 2023–24 NCAA Division I men's basketball season. The Seahawks, led by fourth-year head coach Takayo Siddle, played their home games at Trask Coliseum in Wilmington, North Carolina as members of the Coastal Athletic Association (CAA). The Seahawks finished the season with a 21–10 record, 12–6 in CAA play, to finish in a tie with Hofstra for third place. They were defeated by fifth seed Towson in the quarterfinals of the CAA tournament.

== Previous season ==
The Seahawks finished the 2022–23 season 24–10, 12–6 in CAA play, to finish in a tie for third place. They defeated Drexel in the quarterfinals and upset top-seeded Hofstra in the semifinals before losing to Charleston in the championship game of the CAA tournament.

== Roster ==
2023–24 UNC Wilmington Seahawks men's basketball team
Players
Coaches

| Pos. | # | Name | Height | Weight | Year | Previous school | Hometown |
|---|---|---|---|---|---|---|---|
| G | 0 | KJ Jenkins | 6 ft 2 in (1.88 m) | 180 lb (82 kg) | GS | New Mexico | Atlanta, GA |
| G | 1 | Donovan Newby | 6 ft 1 in (1.85 m) | 185 lb (84 kg) | Sr | Milwaukee | Chicago Heights, IL |
| G | 2 | Shykeim Phillips | 6 ft 2 in (1.88 m) | 190 lb (86 kg) | GS | South Central HS | Winterville, NC |
| G | 3 | Maleeck Harden-Hayes | 6 ft 7 in (2.01 m) | 200 lb (91 kg) | GS | North Dakota State | Moorhead, MN |
| G | 4 | Nolan Hodge | 6 ft 7 in (2.01 m) | 180 lb (82 kg) | So | Northern Guilford HS | Greensboro, NC |
| G | 5 | Noah Ross | 6 ft 7 in (2.01 m) | 205 lb (93 kg) | So | Trinity Academy | Apex, NC |
| F | 10 | Matt Moore | 6 ft 9 in (2.06 m) | 220 lb (100 kg) | Fr | Joliet West HS | Chicago, IL |
| G | 11 | Shane Anthony | 6 ft 2 in (1.88 m) | 170 lb (77 kg) | Fr | Crossroads Christian HS | Raleigh, NC |
| F | 13 | Trazarien White | 6 ft 7 in (2.01 m) | 190 lb (86 kg) | Jr | Collin College | Mansfield, TX |
| G | 20 | Jake Murphy | 6 ft 4 in (1.93 m) | 205 lb (93 kg) | RS So | Air Force | Phoenix, AZ |
| F | 21 | Khamari McGriff | 6 ft 9 in (2.06 m) | 210 lb (95 kg) | RS So | James S. Rickards HS | Tallahassee, FL |
| G | 22 | Shemar Rathan-Mayes | 5 ft 11 in (1.8 m) | 175 lb (79 kg) | Sr | Youngstown State | Scarborough, ON |
| F | 23 | Eric Van Der Heijden | 6 ft 9 in (2.06 m) | 225 lb (102 kg) | Jr | Ole Miss | Raleigh, NC |
| G | 24 | Makoa Surigao | 6 ft 2 in (1.88 m) | 200 lb (91 kg) | Jr | E. A. Laney HS | Wilmington, NC |
| F | 25 | Ahmard Harvey | 6 ft 7 in (2.01 m) | 205 lb (93 kg) | Sr | High Point | Freeport, Bahamas |
| G | 30 | Nick Farrar | 6 ft 7 in (2.01 m) | 255 lb (116 kg) | Sr | Charleston | Apex, NC |

Head coach

- Takayo Siddle (Gardner–Webb)

Assistant coach(es)

- Kurt Kanaskie (La Salle)
- Craig Ponder (UNC Wilmington)
- Paul Hemrick (Georgia)
- Hunter Henderson (NC State)
- Austin Parker (NC State)

Legend

- (C) Team captain
- (S) Suspended
- (I) Ineligible
- (W) Walk-on
- Injured
- Current redshirt

Roster
Last update: November 19, 2023

== Schedule and results ==
| Date time, TV | Rank^{#} | Opponent^{#} | Result | Record | Site (attendance) city, state |
Exhibition
| November 1, 2023*; 7:00 p.m., FloHoops | | Coker | W 131–92 | – | Trask Coliseum (2,786); Wilmington, NC |
Non-conference regular season
| November 6, 2023*; 7:00 p.m., FloHoops | | Mount Olive | W 105–66 | 1–0 | Trask Coliseum (3,577); Wilmington, NC |
| November 11, 2023*; 2:00 p.m., ESPN+ | | at UNC Asheville | W 83–66 | 2–0 | Kimmel Arena (2,170); Asheville, NC |
| November 14, 2023*; 7:00 p.m., FloHoops | | Columbia International | W 116–80 | 3–0 | Trask Coliseum (4,089); Wilmington, NC |
| November 20, 2023*; 1:30 p.m. | | vs. Murray State; Fort Myers Tip-Off Palms Division | W 83–82 ^{OT} | 4–0 | Suncoast Credit Union Arena (487); Fort Myers, FL |
| November 21, 2023*; 12:00 p.m. | | vs. Appalachian State; Fort Myers Tip-Off Palms Division | L 56–86 | 4–1 | Suncoast Credit Union Arena (512); Fort Myers, FL |
| November 25, 2023*; 4:30 p.m., ESPN+ | | at Florida Gulf Coast | W 71–55 | 5–1 | Alico Arena (1,551); Fort Myers, FL |
| November 30, 2023*; 7:00 p.m., ESPN+ | | at East Carolina | L 66–74 | 5–2 | Williams Arena (5,182); Greenville, NC |
| December 2, 2023*; 4:00 p.m., SECN | | at No. 12 Kentucky | W 80–73 | 6–2 | Rupp Arena (19,990); Lexington, KY |
| December 10, 2023*; 2:00 p.m., FloHoops | | Montreat | W 119–50 | 7–2 | Trask Coliseum (4,512); Wilmington, NC |
| December 16, 2023*; 3:00 p.m., ESPN+ | | at Georgia Southern | W 82–77 | 8–2 | Hanner Fieldhouse (1,127); Statesboro, GA |
| December 21, 2023*; 7:00 p.m., ESPN+ | | at Marshall | W 78–69 | 9–2 | Cam Henderson Center (4,034); Huntington, WV |
| December 30, 2023*; 7:00 p.m., SECN | | at Arkansas | L 90–106 | 9–3 | Bud Walton Arena (19,200); Fayetteville, AR |
CAA regular season
| January 4, 2024; 7:00 p.m., FloHoops | | at Drexel | L 63–78 | 9–4 (0–1) | Daskalakis Athletic Center (1,006); Philadelphia, PA |
| January 6, 2024; 2:00 p.m., FloHoops | | at Towson | L 64–67 | 9–5 (0–2) | SECU Arena (1,832); Towson, MD |
| January 11, 2024; 7:00 p.m., FloHoops | | Monmouth | W 69–56 | 10–5 (1–2) | Trask Coliseum (5,100); Wilmington, NC |
| January 14, 2024; 4:00 p.m., CBSSN | | Delaware | W 79–74 | 11–5 (2–2) | Trask Coliseum (5,100); Wilmington, NC |
| January 18, 2024; 7:00 p.m., FloHoops | | at Elon | W 82–70 | 12–5 (3–2) | Schar Center (2,078); Elon, NC |
| January 20, 2024; 6:00 p.m., CBSSN | | Charleston | W 78–69 | 13–5 (4–2) | Trask Coliseum (5,100); Wilmington, NC |
| January 25, 2024; 7:00 p.m., FloHoops | | at Northeastern | W 77–54 | 14–5 (5–2) | Matthews Arena (802); Boston, MA |
| January 27, 2024; 4:00 p.m., CBSSN | | at Stony Brook | L 78–86 ^{OT} | 14–6 (5–3) | Island Federal Arena (2,871); Stony Brook, NY |
| February 1, 2024; 7:00 p.m., FloHoops | | at Charleston | W 80–74 | 15–6 (6–3) | TD Arena (5,021); Charleston, SC |
| February 3, 2024; 7:00 p.m., FloHoops | | Campbell | W 77–74 | 16–6 (7–3) | Trask Coliseum (5,100); Wilmington, NC |
| February 8, 2024; 7:00 p.m., FloHoops | | Drexel | W 75–56 | 17–6 (8–3) | Trask Coliseum (5,100); Wilmington, NC |
| February 10, 2024; 2:00 p.m., FloHoops | | at Hampton | W 95–65 | 18–6 (9–3) | Hampton Convocation Center (1,949); Hampton, VA |
| February 15, 2024; 7:00 p.m., FloHoops | | North Carolina A&T | W 73–54 | 19–6 (10–3) | Trask Coliseum (4,851); Wilmington, NC |
| February 17, 2024; 7:00 p.m., FloHoops | | Elon | L 72–73 | 19–7 (10–4) | Trask Coliseum (5,100); Wilmington, NC |
| February 22, 2024; 7:00 p.m., FloHoops | | at William & Mary | W 81–65 | 20–7 (11–4) | Kaplan Arena (2,179); Williamsburg, VA |
| February 26, 2024; 8:30 p.m., CBSSN | | at Campbell | L 100–105 ^{2OT} | 20–8 (11–5) | Gore Arena (1,794); Buies Creek, NC |
| February 29, 2024; 7:00 p.m., FloHoops | | Hofstra | L 58–69 | 20–9 (11–6) | Trask Coliseum (4,937); Wilmington, NC |
| March 2, 2024; 7:00 p.m., FloHoops | | Towson | W 75–64 | 21–9 (12–6) | Trask Coliseum (5,100); Wilmington, NC |
CAA tournament
| March 10, 2024; 2:30 p.m., FloHoops | (4) | vs. (5) Towson; Quarterfinals | L 56–66 | 21–10 | Entertainment and Sports Arena (2,108); Washington, D.C. |
*Non-conference game. ^{#}Rankings from AP poll. (#) Tournament seedings in parentheses. All times are in Eastern.
