= 2023–24 Campbell Fighting Camels men's basketball team =

American college basketball season

2023–24 Campbell Fighting Camels men's basketball
- Conference: Coastal Athletic Association
- Record: 14–18 (8–10 CAA)
- Head coach: Kevin McGeehan (11th season)
- Assistant coaches: Chris Long; Monty Sanders; Mike Summey
- Home arena: Gore Arena

2023–24 CAA men's basketball standings
	Conf.				Overall
Team	W		L	PCT	W		L	PCT
Charleston †	15	–	3	.833	27	–	8	.771
Drexel	13	–	5	.722	20	–	12	.625
Hofstra	12	–	6	.667	20	–	13	.606
UNC Wilmington	12	–	6	.667	21	–	10	.677
Towson	11	–	7	.611	20	–	14	.588
Delaware	10	–	8	.556	19	–	14	.576
Stony Brook	10	–	8	.556	20	–	15	.571
Monmouth	10	–	8	.556	18	–	15	.545
Campbell	8	–	10	.444	14	–	18	.438
Northeastern	7	–	11	.389	12	–	20	.375
Elon	6	–	12	.333	13	–	19	.406
North Carolina A&T	5	–	13	.278	7	–	25	.219
William & Mary	4	–	14	.222	10	–	23	.303
Hampton	3	–	15	.167	9	–	24	.273
† 2024 CAA tournament winner

The 2023–24 Campbell Fighting Camels men's basketball team represented Campbell University in the 2023–24 NCAA Division I men's basketball season. The Fighting Camels, led by 11th-year head coach Kevin McGeehan, played their home games at Gore Arena in Buies Creek, North Carolina as first-year members of the Coastal Athletic Association (CAA).

The Fighting Camels finished the season 14–18, 8–10 in CAA play, to finish in ninth place. They were defeated by Monmouth in the second round of the CAA tournament.

== Previous season ==
The Fighting Camels finished the 2022–23 season 16–18, 8–10 in Big South play, to finish in seventh place. As the #7 seed in the Big South tournament, they defeated #10 seed Presbyterian in the first round, #2 seed Longwood in the quarterfinals, and #3 seed Radford in the semifinals, before falling to #1 seed UNC Asheville in the championship game.

== Roster ==
2023–24 Campbell Fighting Camels men's basketball team
Players
Coaches

Pos.	#	Name	Height	Weight	Year	Hometown
G	0	Gediminas Mokseckas	6 ft 4 in (1.93 m)	200 lb (91 kg)	Sr	Vilnius, Lithuania
G	1	Tasos Cook	6 ft 2 in (1.88 m)	200 lb (91 kg)	Jr	Columbus, OH
F	2	Colby Duggan	6 ft 7 in (2.01 m)	210 lb (95 kg)	Fr	Monson, MA
G	4	Broc Bidwell	6 ft 0 in (1.83 m)	170 lb (77 kg)	RS So	Cumming, GA
G	5	Elijah Walsh	6 ft 5 in (1.96 m)	185 lb (84 kg)	So	Leeds, England
G	7	Efe Gucoglu	6 ft 3 in (1.91 m)	180 lb (82 kg)	Fr	Istanbul, Turkey
G/F	10	Mason Grant	6 ft 5 in (1.96 m)	205 lb (93 kg)	RS So	North Charleston, SC
G	11	Omar Harris	6 ft 3 in (1.91 m)	180 lb (82 kg)	So	Plymouth, NC
F	12	Sam Perez	6 ft 8 in (2.03 m)	210 lb (95 kg)	So	Raleigh, NC
G	13	Jasin Sinani	6 ft 3 in (1.91 m)	195 lb (88 kg)	Jr	Oak Creek, WI
G	14	Mehmet Bener	6 ft 1 in (1.85 m)	180 lb (82 kg)	Fr	Ankara, Turkey
G	15	Justin Boggs	6 ft 2 in (1.88 m)	180 lb (82 kg)	Fr	Ashburn, VA
G	21	Nolan Dorsey	6 ft 5 in (1.96 m)	205 lb (93 kg)	Sr	Knightdale, NC
F	22	Laurynas Vaistaras	6 ft 6 in (1.98 m)	215 lb (98 kg)	Sr	Plungė, Lithuania
C	24	Wesley Johnson	7 ft 0 in (2.13 m)	230 lb (104 kg)	So	Raleigh, NC
G	30	Anthony Dell'Orso	6 ft 6 in (1.98 m)	190 lb (86 kg)	So	Melbourne, Australia
F	35	Alex Kotov	6 ft 10 in (2.08 m)	230 lb (104 kg)	GS	Moscow, Russia

Head coach

- Kevin McGeehan (Gettysburg)

Assistant coach(es)

- Chris Long (Elon)
- Monty Sanders (Elon)
- Mike Summey (NC State)

Legend

- (C) Team captain
- (S) Suspended
- (I) Ineligible
- (W) Walk-on
- Injured
- Current redshirt

Roster
Last update: November 17, 2023

== Schedule and results ==
Date time, TV	Rank^{#}	Opponent^{#}	Result	Record	Site (attendance) city, state
Non-conference regular season
November 6, 2023*; 8:00 p.m., FloHoops		Navy	W 59–48	1–0	Gore Arena (1,357); Buies Creek, NC
November 11, 2023*; 2:00 p.m., ESPN+		at East Carolina	L 63–77	1–1	Williams Arena (4,621); Greenville, NC
November 15, 2023*; 6:00 p.m., ACCNX/ESPN+		at Virginia Tech	L 44–60	1–2	Cassell Coliseum (5,899); Blacksburg, VA
November 20, 2023*; 7:00 p.m., FloHoops		North Carolina Central; Campbell Classic	L 75–78 ^{OT}	1–3	Gore Arena (1,109); Buies Creek, NC
November 21, 2023*; 7:00 p.m., FloHoops		Idaho State; Campbell Classic	L 55–69	1–4	Gore Arena (886); Buies Creek, NC
November 22, 2023*; 5:00 p.m., FloHoops		The Citadel	W 65–58	2–4	Gore Arena (901); Buies Creek, NC
November 29, 2023*; 6:00 p.m., ESPN+		at Jacksonville	L 48–62	2–5	Swisher Gymnasium (456); Jacksonville, FL
December 2, 2023*; 2:00 p.m., FloHoops		Southern Virginia	W 87–56	3–5	Gore Arena (1,031); Buies Creek, NC
December 6, 2023*; 7:00 p.m., ESPN+		at Davidson	L 50–62	3–6	John M. Belk Arena (2,223); Davidson, NC
December 12, 2023*; 7:00 p.m., FloHoops		Pfeiffer	W 88–59	4–6	Gore Arena (787); Buies Creek, NC
December 14, 2023*; 7:00 p.m., FloHoops		St. Augustine's	W 97–48	5–6	Gore Arena (801); Buies Creek, NC
December 18, 2023*; 7:00 p.m., FloHoops		Morgan State	W 83–76	6–6	Gore Arena (871); Buies Creek, NC
December 30, 2023*; 4:00 p.m., NEC Front Row		at Saint Francis (PA)	L 76–78	6–7	DeGol Arena (603); Loretto, PA
CAA regular season
January 4, 2024; 7:00 p.m., FloHoops		at North Carolina A&T	L 62–76	6–8 (0–1)	Corbett Sports Center (1,089); Greensboro, NC
January 6, 2024; 4:00 p.m., FloHoops		at Hampton	W 80–69	7–8 (1–1)	Hampton Convocation Center (537); Hampton, VA
January 11, 2024; 7:00 p.m., FloHoops		Delaware	L 62–68	7–9 (1–2)	Gore Arena (1,843); Buies Creek, NC
January 13, 2024; 2:00 p.m., FloHoops		Hofstra	W 69–68	8–9 (2–2)	Gore Arena (1,122); Buies Creek, NC
January 18, 2024; 7:00 p.m., FloHoops		at William & Mary	W 77–64	9–9 (3–2)	Kaplan Arena (2,748); Williamsburg, VA
January 20, 2024; 2:00 p.m., FloHoops		at Towson	L 43–77	9–10 (3–3)	SECU Arena (2,108); Towson, MD
January 25, 2024; 5:00 p.m., CBSSN		Elon	W 78–68	10–10 (4–3)	Gore Arena (1,813); Buies Creek, NC
January 27, 2024; 2:00 p.m., FloHoops		Charleston	L 67–90	10–11 (4–4)	Gore Arena (1,617); Buies Creek, NC
February 1, 2024; 7:00 p.m., FloHoops		at Elon	W 69–67	11–11 (5–4)	Schar Center (2,160); Elon, NC
February 3, 2024; 7:00 p.m., FloHoops		at UNC Wilmington	L 74–77	11–12 (5–5)	Trask Coliseum (5,100); Wilmington, NC
February 8, 2024; 7:00 p.m., FloHoops		Northeastern	L 76–86	11–13 (5–6)	Gore Arena (1,024); Buies Creek, NC
February 10, 2024; 2:00 p.m., FloHoops		Stony Brook	W 95–77	12–13 (6–6)	Gore Arena (1,742); Buies Creek, NC
February 15, 2024; 7:00 p.m., FloHoops		at Monmouth	L 87–88	12–14 (6–7)	OceanFirst Bank Center (1,582); West Long Branch, NJ
February 17, 2024; 2:00 p.m., FloHoops		at Drexel	L 66–81	12–15 (6–8)	Daskalakis Athletic Center (1,502); Philadelphia, PA
February 22, 2024; 7:00 p.m., FloHoops		Hampton	L 68–72	12–16 (6–9)	Gore Arena (1,109); Buies Creek, NC
February 26, 2024; 8:30 p.m., CBSSN		UNC Wilmington	W 105–100 ^{2OT}	13–16 (7–9)	Gore Arena (1,794); Buies Creek, NC
February 29, 2024; 7:00 p.m., FloHoops		at Charleston	L 73–96	13–17 (7–10)	TD Arena (4,905); Charleston, SC
March 2, 2024; 4:00 p.m., FloHoops		North Carolina A&T	W 64–62	14–17 (8–10)	Gore Arena (1,547); Buies Creek, NC
CAA tournament
March 9, 2024; 12:00 p.m., FloHoops	(9)	vs. (8) Monmouth; Second round	L 67–90	14–18	Entertainment and Sports Arena; Washington, D.C.
*Non-conference game. ^{#}Rankings from AP poll. (#) Tournament seedings in parentheses. All times are in Eastern.
