= Kevin McGeehan =

American basketball coach (born 1973)

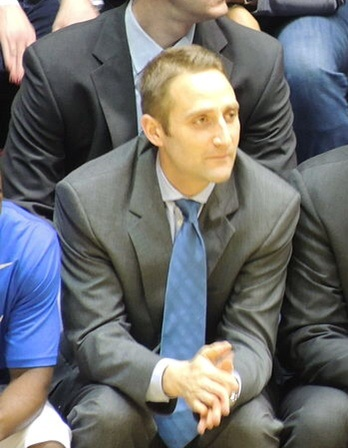

Current position
- Title: Assistant coach
- Team: Wofford
- Conference: Southern Conference

Biographical details
- Born: October 30, 1973 (age 52)

Playing career
- 1991–1995: Gettysburg

Coaching career (HC unless noted)
- 1998–2000: Beaver College (assistant)
- 2000–2002: Beaver College
- 2002–2004: Springfield Township HS
- 2004–2005: Air Force (assistant)
- 2005–2008: Richmond (assistant)
- 2008–2013: Richmond (AHC)
- 2013–2025: Campbell
- 2025–present: Wofford (assistant)

Head coaching record
- Overall: 184–199 (.480)
- Tournaments: 0–1 (NIT); 2–1 (CBI); 2–1 (CIT)

Accomplishments and honors

Championships
- Big South regular season (2019)

Awards
- Big South Coach of the Year (2019)

Kevin McGeehan (born October 30, 1973) is an American college basketball coach who is currently an assistant coach at Wofford College.

McGeehan was an assistant coach at the University of Richmond for eight seasons.

In 2013 he was hired at Campbell University in April 2013, replacing Robbie Laing. He was named Big South Coach of the Year in 2019.

In September 2025, McGeehan was named assistant men's basketball coach at Wofford College.

== NCAA Division I coaching record ==
Record table
Season	Team	Overall	Conference	Standing	Postseason
Campbell Fighting Camels (Big South Conference) (2013–2023)
2013–14	Campbell	12–20	6–10	4th (North)	
2014–15	Campbell	10–22	4–14	10th	
2015–16	Campbell	12–18	5–13	T–8th	
2016–17	Campbell	19–18	6–12	T–6th	CIT Quarterfinals
2017–18	Campbell	18–16	10–8	4th	CBI Semifinals
2018–19	Campbell	20–13	12–4	T–1st	NIT First Round
2019–20	Campbell	15–16	6–12	T–10th	
2020–21	Campbell	17–10	11–6	3rd	
2021–22	Campbell	16–13	8–8	2nd (North)	
2022–23	Campbell	16–18	8–10	7th	
Campbell Fighting Camels (Coastal Athletic Association) (2023–2025)
2023–24	Campbell	14–18	8–10	9th	
2024–25	Campbell	15–17	10–8	T–5th	
Campbell:		184–199 (.480)	94–116 (.448)		
Total:		184–199 (.480)			
National champion Postseason invitational champion Conference regular season champion Conference regular season and conference tournament champion Division regular season champion Division regular season and conference tournament champion Conference tournament champion
