= Dane Fischer =

American basketball coach (born 1979)

Biographical details
- Born: September 20, 1979 (age 47); Rochester, Minnesota, U.S.

Playing career
- 1999–2002: Ithaca

Coaching career (HC unless noted)
- 2003–2005: Williams (assistant)
- 2005–2008: Rider (assistant)
- 2008–2015: Bucknell (assistant)
- 2015–2019: George Mason (assistant)
- 2019–2024: William & Mary

Head coaching record
- Overall: 56–91 (.381)

Accomplishments and honors

Awards
- CAA Coach of the Year (2020)

Dane Fischer (born September 20, 1979) is an American basketball coach and the former head coach of the William & Mary Tribe men's basketball team.

== Playing career ==
Fischer played college basketball at Ithaca College, where he graduated in the top 10 in career steals and assists while helping guide the Bombers to an NCAA Tournament appearance.

== Coaching career ==
Upon graduation, Fischer entered the coaching ranks, taking an assistant coaching position at Williams College under Dave Paulsen, where the Ephs reached the national championship game of the 2004 NCAA Division III Tournament. In 2005, Fischer headed to the Division I ranks joining the coaching staff at Rider, where he stayed until 2008 before reuniting with Paulsen who had taken the head coaching position at Bucknell. While on staff with the Bison, Fischer was part of two NCAA Tournament squads and four Patriot League regular season championship teams. In 2015, Fischer followed Paulsen to George Mason to serve as assistant coach.

On April 2, 2019, Fischer was named the 31st head men's basketball coach in William & Mary history, replacing Tony Shaver.

Fischer was fired on March 10, 2024, with a five-year record of 56–91.

== Head coaching record ==
Record table
Season	Team	Overall	Conference	Standing	Postseason
William & Mary (Coastal Athletic Association) (2019–2024)
2019–20	William & Mary	21–11	13–5	2nd	
2020–21	William & Mary	7–10	4–6	7th	
2021–22	William & Mary	5–27	4–14	9th	
2022–23	William & Mary	13–20	7–11	8th	
2023–24	William & Mary	10–23	4–14	13th	
William & Mary:		56–91 (.381)	32–50 (.390)		
Total:		56–91 (.381)			
National champion Postseason invitational champion Conference regular season champion Conference regular season and conference tournament champion Division regular season champion Division regular season and conference tournament champion Conference tournament champion
