= Phillip Shumpert =

American college basketball coach (born 1974)

Current position
- Title: Assistant coach
- Team: Southern Jaguars
- Conference: Southwestern Athletic Conference

Biographical details
- Born: July 10, 1974 (age 52); Fulton, Mississippi, U.S.
- Education: United States Sports Academy (2006)

Coaching career (HC unless noted)
- 2006–2007: Columbia HS (assistant)
- 2007–2008: Lawson State CC (assistant)
- 2008–2009: West Alabama (assistant)
- 2009–2013: Lawson State CC
- 2013–2014: Southern Poly (assistant)
- 2014–2015: Jackson State (assistant)
- 2015–2016: Lawson State CC
- 2016–2017: Starr's Mill HS (associate head coach)
- 2019–2022: North Carolina A&T (assistant)
- 2022–2023: North Carolina A&T (interim HC)
- 2023–2025: Louisiana (assistant)
- 2025–present: Southern (assistant)

Head coaching record
- Overall: 13–19 (.406)

Phillip Shumpert (born June 10, 1974) is an American college basketball coach, who is currently an assistant coach for the Southern Jaguars. He was the interim head coach at North Carolina A&T.

== Coaching career ==
Shumpert started his coaching career at Columbia High School as an assistant where he would coach for one year. He would then move on to Lawson as an assistant coach for one year, before receiving an assistant coaching job at West Alabama which he accepted and coached at for one year. He would then return as the head coach for Lawson where he would stay for four years. Next he would be hired as an assistant at Southern Poly for one year. From there he would take an assistant coaching job at Jackson State for one year. He would then return to Lawson as their head coach for one year. Shumpert would then go to Starr's Mill High School as their associate head coach for a year, before becoming a consultant Georgia Hoop Circle for two years. He would then return to the college ranks as an assistant coach for North Carolina A&T. He would hold that position for three years, but on August 18, 2022, head coach Will Jones was fired and Shumpert was named as the Interim head coach for North Carolina A&T. In his season as the interim head coach for the Aggies he went 13-19 and was not retained at the end of the year.

He was named an assistant coach for the Louisiana Ragin' Cajuns on September 1, 2023.

== Head coaching record ==
=== College ===
Record table
Season	Team	Overall	Conference	Standing	Postseason
North Carolina A&T (Colonial Athletic Association) (2022–2023)
2022–23	North Carolina A&T	13–19	8–10	7th	
North Carolina A&T:		13–19 (.406)	8–10 (.444)		
Total:		13–19 (.406)			
National champion Postseason invitational champion Conference regular season champion Conference regular season and conference tournament champion Division regular season champion Division regular season and conference tournament champion Conference tournament champion
