= Tyler Thomas (basketball) =

American basketball player (born 2000)

No. 23 – Alba Fehérvár
- Position: Shooting guard
- League: Nemzeti Bajnokság I/A

Personal information
- Born: February 2, 2000 (age 26) New York City, New York, U.S.
- Listed height: 6 ft 3 in (1.91 m)
- Listed weight: 195 lb (88 kg)

Career information
- High school: Amity Regional (Woodbridge, Connecticut); Williston Northampton School (Easthampton, Massachusetts)
- College: Sacred Heart (2019–2022); Hofstra (2022–2024)
- NBA draft: 2024: undrafted
- Playing career: 2024–present

Career history
- 2024–present: Alba Fehérvár

Career highlights
- CAA Player of the Year (2024); First-team All-CAA (2024); Second-team All-CAA (2023); Second-team All-NEC (2021); Haggerty Award winner (2024)

Tyler Thomas (born February 2, 2000) is an American basketball player who graduated from Hofstra University in 2024, and is now playing professionally in Hungary with Alba Fehérvár.

== Early life ==
Thomas was born in New York City and has a younger brother, Tanner, who is also a basketball player. He attended Amity Regional High School. As a senior, Thomas led the team to the CIAC state championship game and was named the New Haven Register’s Area MVP, finishing his career with 1,531 points for the Spartans. He opted to do a postgraduate year at Williston Northampton School and received All-NEPSAC honors. Thomas committed to play college basketball at Sacred Heart over Merrimack.

== College career ==
Thomas averaged 5.6 points per game as a freshman on a team led by E. J. Anosike. He averaged 19.1 points and 5.2 rebounds per game as a sophomore, and was named to the Second-team All-NEC as well as NEC Most Improved Player. As a junior, Thomas averaged 16.4 points and 3.4 rebounds per game, earning Third Team All-NEC honors. He decided to transfer to Hofstra after the season.

Thomas averaged 16.5 points, 3.8 rebounds and 1.3 assists per game as a senior. He declared for the 2023 NBA draft after the season before withdrawing and returning to Hofstra for his final season of eligibility. On January 26, 2024, Thomas passed the 2,000-point threshold in a win against William & Mary. At the conclusion of the regular season he was named CAA Player of the Year.

== Professional career ==
After playing in two games for the Chicago Bulls in the NBA Summer League, Thomas signed with Alba Fehérvár of the Hungarian Nemzeti Bajnokság I/A (NB I/A) on August 9, 2024.
