= 2022–23 Colonial Athletic Association men's basketball season =

- League: NCAA Division I
- Sport: Basketball
- Duration: November, 2022 – March, 2023
- Teams: 13

Regular season
- Champions: Charleston; Hofstra
- Runners-up: Towson
- Season MVP: Aaron Estrada (Hofstra)
- Top scorer: Jameer Nelson Jr. (Delaware)

Tournament
- Champions: Charleston
- Runners-up: UNC Wilmington
- Finals MVP: Ryan Larson (Charleston)

CAA men's basketball seasons
- ← 2021–22 2023–24 →

2022–23 CAA men's basketball standings
	Conf.				Overall
Team	W		L	PCT	W		L	PCT
Hofstra	16	–	2	.889	25	–	10	.714
Charleston †	16	–	2	.889	31	–	4	.886
Towson	12	–	6	.667	21	–	12	.636
UNC Wilmington	12	–	6	.667	24	–	10	.706
Drexel	10	–	8	.556	17	–	15	.531
Delaware	8	–	10	.444	17	–	16	.515
North Carolina A&T	8	–	10	.444	13	–	19	.406
William & Mary	7	–	11	.389	13	–	20	.394
Elon	6	–	12	.333	8	–	24	.250
Stony Brook	6	–	12	.333	11	–	22	.333
Northeastern	6	–	12	.333	10	–	20	.333
Hampton	5	–	13	.278	8	–	24	.250
Monmouth	5	–	13	.278	7	–	26	.212
† 2023 CAA tournament winner

The 2022–23 CAA men's basketball season was the 37th season of Colonial Athletic Association basketball, taking place between November 2022 and March 2023. The season ended with the 2023 CAA men's basketball tournament.

This was the first CAA season after James Madison left to join the Sun Belt Conference, and also the first season for four new CAA members—Hampton, Monmouth, North Carolina A&T, and Stony Brook.

This was also the last season for the conference under the Colonial Athletic Association name. On July 20, 2023, the CAA announced it had changed its name to Coastal Athletic Association.

== Head coaches ==
=== Coaching changes ===
- Billy Taylor replaced Mike Schrage as Elon head coach.
- Willie Jones was fired as North Carolina A&T head coach before the season began. Phillip Shumpert was hired as interim head coach.

=== Coaches ===
Team	Head coach	Previous job	Year at school	Record at school	CAA record	CAA championships	NCAA tournaments
Charleston	Pat Kelsey	Winthrop	2	17–15	8–10	0	0
Delaware	Martin Ingelsby	Notre Dame (asst.)	7	95–86	45–54	1	1
Drexel	Zach Spiker	Army	7	76–103	36–63	1	1
Elon	Billy Taylor	Iowa (asst.)	1	0–0	0–0	0	0
Hampton	Edward Joyner	Hampton (asst.)	14	206–209	0–0	0	3
Hofstra	Speedy Claxton	Hofstra (asst.)	2	21–11	13–5	0	0
Monmouth	King Rice	Vanderbilt (asst.)	12	182–166	0–0	0	0
North Carolina A&T	Phillip Shumpert (interim)	North Carolina A&T (asst.)	0	0–0	0–0	0	0
Northeastern	Bill Coen	Boston College (asst.)	17	260–244	156–122	2	2
Stony Brook	Geno Ford	Stony Brook (Interim HC)	5	37–41	0–0	0	0
Towson	Pat Skerry	Pittsburgh (asst.)	12	172–173	98–92	0	0
UNC Wilmington	Takayo Siddle	NC State (asst.)	3	34–19	16–9	0	0
William & Mary	Dane Fischer	George Mason (asst.)	4	33–48	21–25	0	0

Notes:

- All records, appearances, titles, etc. are from time with current school only.
- Year at school includes 2022–23 season.
- Overall and CAA records are from time at current school and are through the end of the 2021–22 season.

== Preseason ==
=== Preseason poll ===
Rank	Team	Points
1	Towson (12)	144
2	Hofstra	122
3	Delaware	121
4	Charleston (1)	119
5	UNC Wilmington	101
6	Northeastern	84
7	Drexel	82
8	William & Mary	52
9	Stony Brook	50
10	Monmouth	49
11	North Carolina A&T	35
12	Elon	30
13	Hampton	25

() first place votes

=== Preseason All-Conference Teams ===
Award	Recipients
First Team	Aaron Estrada (Hofstra); Cam Holden (Towson); Jameer Nelson Jr (Delaware); Charles Thompson (Towson); Nicolas Timberlake (Towson)
Second Team	Jyáre Davis (Delaware); Shykeim Phillips (UNC Wilmington); Reyne Smith (Charleston); Jahmyl Telfort (Northeastern); Amari Williams (Drexel)
Honorable Mention	Ben Burnham (Charleston); Aaron Clarke (Stony Brook); Deuce Dean (Hampton); Chris Doherty (Northeastern); Darlinstone Dubar (Hofstra); Marcus Watson (North Carolina A&T); Ben Wight (William & Mary)

Colonial Athletic Association Preseason Player of the Year: Aaron Estrada (Hofstra)

== Regular season ==
=== Rankings ===
Legend
	Increase in ranking
	Decrease in ranking
	Not ranked previous week
RV	Received votes
(Italics)	Number of first place votes

		Pre	Wk 2	Wk 3	Wk 4	Wk 5	Wk 6	Wk 7	Wk 8	Wk 9	Wk 10	Wk 11	Wk 12	Wk 13	Wk 14	Wk 15	Wk 16	Wk 17	Wk 18	Wk 19	Final
Charleston	AP			RV	RV	RV	RV	RV	RV	23	22	18	18	RV	RV	RV	RV	RV	RV		
Charleston	C			RV	RV	RV	RV	RV	RV	RV	24	21	18	RV	RV	RV					
Delaware	AP																				
Delaware	C																				
Drexel	AP																				
Drexel	C																				
Elon	AP																				
Elon	C																				
Hampton	AP																				
Hampton	C																				
Hofstra	AP																				
Hofstra	C																				
Monmouth	AP																				
Monmouth	C																				
North Carolina A&T	AP																				
North Carolina A&T	C																				
Northeastern	AP																				
Northeastern	C																				
Stony Brook	AP																				
Stony Brook	C																				
Towson	AP																				
Towson	C																				
UNC Wilmington	AP																				
UNC Wilmington	C																				
William & Mary	AP																				
William & Mary	C																				

=== Conference matrix ===
This table summarizes the head-to-head results between teams in conference play.

	Charleston	Delaware	Drexel	Elon	Hampton	Hofstra	Monmouth	North Carolina A&T	Northeastern	Stony Brook	Towson	UNC Wilmington	William & Mary
vs. Charleston	–	0–0	0–0	0–0	0–0	0–0	0–0	0–0	0–0	0–0	0–0	0–0	0–0
vs. Delaware	0–0	–	0–0	0–0	0–0	0–0	0–0	0–0	0–0	0–0	0–0	0–0	0–0
vs. Drexel	0–0	0–0	–	0–0	0–0	0–0	0–0	0–0	0–0	0–0	0–0	0–0	0–0
vs. Elon	0–0	0–0	0–0	–	0–0	0–0	0–0	0–0	0–0	0–0	0–0	0–0	0–0
vs. Hampton	0–0	0–0	0–0	0–0	–	0–0	0–0	0–0	0–0	0–0	0–0	0–0	0–0
vs. Hofstra	0–0	0–0	0–0	0–0	0–0	–	0–0	0–0	0–0	0–0	0–0	0–0	0–0
vs. Monmouth	0–0	0–0	0–0	0–0	0–0	0–0	–	0–0	0–0	0–0	0–0	0–0	0–0
vs. North Carolina A&T	0–0	0–0	0–0	0–0	0–0	0–0	0–0	–	0–0	0–0	0–0	0–0	0–0
vs. Northeastern	0–0	0–0	0–0	0–0	0–0	0–0	0–0	0–0	–	0–0	0–0	0–0	0–0
vs. Stony Brook	0–0	0–0	0–0	0–0	0–0	0–0	0–0	0–0	0–0	–	0–0	0–0	0–0
vs. Towson	0–0	0–0	0–0	0–0	0–0	0–0	0–0	0–0	0–0	0–0	–	0–0	0–0
vs. UNC Wilmington	0–0	0–0	0–0	0–0	0–0	0–0	0–0	0–0	0–0	0–0	0–0	–	0–0
vs. William & Mary	0–0	0–0	0–0	0–0	0–0	0–0	0–0	0–0	0–0	0–0	0–0	0–0	–
Total	0–0	0–0	0–0	0–0	0–0	0–0	0–0	0–0	0–0	0–0	0–0	0–0	0–0

== Postseason ==
=== NCAA tournament ===
The CAA had one bid to the 2023 NCAA Division I men's basketball tournament, that being the automatic bid of Charleston by winning the conference tournament.

Seed	Region	School	First Four	First Round	Second Round	Sweet 16	Elite Eight	Final Four	Championship
12	South	Charleston	Bye	vs (12) San Diego State					
Bids		W-L (%):	0–0 (–)	0–0 (–)	0–0 (–)	0–0 (–)	0–0 (–)	0–0 (–)	TOTAL: 0–0 (–)

=== National Invitation tournament ===
Hofstra received an automatic bid to the 2023 National Invitation Tournament as regular-season conference champions.

Seed	School	First Round	Second Round	Quarterfinals	Semifinals	Championship
	Hofstra	vs Rutgers				
Bids	W-L (%):	0–0 (–)	0–0 (–)	0–0 (–)	0–0 (–)	TOTAL: 0–0 (–)

=== College Basketball Invitational ===
Seed	School	First Round	Quarterfinals	Semifinals	Championship
Bids	W-L (%):	0–0 (–)	0–0 (–)	0–0 (–)	TOTAL: 0–0 (–)

== Awards and honors ==
=== Regular season ===
==== CAA Player of the Week ====
- Nov. 14 – Nicolas Timberlake (Towson)
- Nov. 21 – Aaron Estrada (Hofstra), Ryan Larson (Charleston)
- Nov. 28 – Cam Holden (Towson)
- Dec. 5 – Jyáre Davis (Delaware), Jordan Nesbitt (Hampton)
- Dec. 12 – Jameer Nelson Jr. (Delaware)
- Dec. 19 – Jyáre Davis (Delaware)(2)
- Dec. 26 – Maleeck Harden-Hayes (UNCW)
- Jan. 2 – Amari Williams (Drexel)
- Jan. 9 – Aaron Estrada (Hofstra)(2), Nicolas Timberlake (Towson)(2)
- Jan. 16 – Dalton Bolon (Charleston)
- Jan. 23 – Nicolas Timberlake (Towson)(3)
- Jan. 30 – Aaron Estrada (Hofstra)(3)
- Feb. 6 – Tyler Thomas (Hofstra)
- Feb. 13 – Pat Robinson III (Charleston)
- Feb. 20 – Jameer Nelson Jr. (Delaware)(2)
- Feb. 27 – Jameer Nelson Jr. (Delaware)(3)

==== CAA Rookie of the Week ====
- Nov. 14 – Amar’e Marshall (Hofstra)
- Nov. 21 – Amar’e Marshall (Hofstra)(2)
- Nov. 28 – Amar’e Marshall (Hofstra)(3)
- Dec. 5 – Jack Collins (Monmouth)
- Dec. 12 – Amar’e Marshall (Hofstra)(4)
- Dec. 19 – Noah Ross (UNCW)
- Dec. 26 – Max Mackinnon (Elon), Jared Turner (Northeastern)
- Jan. 2 – Duncan Powell (North Carolina A&T)
- Jan. 9 – Duncan Powell (North Carolina A&T)(2)
- Jan. 16 – Charlie Williams (William & Mary)
- Jan. 23 – Justin Moore (Drexel)
- Jan. 30 – Jack Collins (Monmouth)(2)
- Feb. 6 – Max Mackinnon (Elon)(2)
- Feb. 13 – Max Mackinnon (Elon)(3)
- Feb. 20 – Max Mackinnon (Elon)(4)
- Feb. 27 – Kyrese Mullen (Hampton)

=== Postseason ===
==== CAA All-Conference Teams and Awards ====
Award	Recipients
Player of the Year	Aaron Estrada (Hofstra)
Coach of the Year	Speedy Claxton (Hofstra)
Rookie of the Year	Max Mackinnon (Elon)
Defensive Player of the Year	Amari Williams (Drexel)
Sixth Man of the Year	Pat Robinson III (Charleston)
Dean Ehlers Leadership Award	Coleman Stucke (Northeastern)
Scholar-Athlete of the Year	Zac Ervin (Elon)
First Team	Dalton Bolon (Charleston); Aaron Estrada (Hofstra); Jameer Nelson Jr. (Delaware); Nicolas Timberlake (Towson); Amari Williams (Drexel)
Second Team	Cam Holden (Towson); Tyler Thomas (Hofstra); Charles Thompson (Towson); Trazarien White (UNCW); Kam Woods (North Carolina A&T)
Third Team	Ante Brzovic (Charleston); Jyáre Davis (Delaware); Ryan Larson (Charleston); Tyler Stephenson-Moore (Stony Brook); Jahmyl Telfort (Northeastern)
All-Defensive Team	Jaquan Carlos (Hofstra); Jameer Nelson Jr. (Delaware); Jaylon Scott (Charleston); Charles Thompson (Towson); Amari Williams (Drexel)
All-Rookie Team	Jack Collins (Monmouth); Max Mackinnon (Elon); Justin Moore (Drexel); Kyrese Mullen (Hampton); Duncan Powell (North Carolina A&T)
All-Tournament Team	Ante Brzovic (Charleston); Aaron Estrada (Hofstra); Ryan Larson (Charleston); Donovan Newby (UNCW); Nicolas Timberlake (Towson) Trazarien White (UNCW)
Tournament MVP	Ryan Larson (Charleston)

== Attendance ==
Team	Arena	Capacity	Game 1	Game 2	Game 3	Game 4	Game 5	Game 6	Game 7	Game 8	Total	Average	% of Capacity
Team	Arena	Capacity	Game 9	Game 10	Game 11	Game 12	Game 13	Game 14	Game 15	Game 16	Total	Average	% of Capacity
Charleston	TD Arena	5,100											0%
Delaware	Bob Carpenter Center	5,100											0%
Drexel	Daskalakis Athletic Center	2,509											0%
Elon	Schar Center	5,100											0%
Hampton	Hampton Convocation Center	7,200											0%
Hofstra	Mack Sports Complex	5,023											0%
Monmouth	OceanFirst Bank Center	4,100											0%
North Carolina A&T	Corbett Sports Center	5,000											0%
Northeastern	Matthews Arena	6,000											0%
Stony Brook	Island Federal Credit Union Arena	4,160											0%
Towson	SECU Arena	5,200											0%
UNC Wilmington	Trask Coliseum	5,200											0%
William & Mary	Kaplan Arena	8,600											0%
