= Ante Brzović =

Croatian basketball player (born 2000)

No. 10 – ZTE KK
- Position: Power forward / small forward
- League: NB I/A

Personal information
- Born: June 2, 2000 (age 26) Zagreb, Croatia
- Listed height: 6 ft 10 in (2.08 m)
- Listed weight: 225 lb (102 kg)

Career information
- High school: Zdravstveno uciliste Zagreb (Zagreb, Croatia)
- College: SE Oklahoma State (2021–2022); Charleston (2022–2025)
- Playing career: 2017–present

Career history
- 2017–2020: Cedevita/Cedevita Junior
- 2019–2020: Bosco
- 2025: Vendée Challans
- 2025–2026: Stal Ostrów Wielkopolski
- 2026–present: Zalakerámia ZTE KK

Career highlights
- 2× First-team All-CAA (2024, 2025); Third-team All-CAA (2023); First-team All-GAC (2022); GAC Rookie of the Year (2022)

Ante Brzović (born June 2, 2000) is a Croatian professional basketball player for Zalakerámia ZTE KK of the Hungarian Nemzeti Bajnokság I/A. He played college basketball for the Charleston Cougars and the Southeastern Oklahoma State Savage Storm.

== Early life and junior career ==
Ante Brzović grew up in Zagreb, Croatia as the son of Ivan and Ivana Brzović. He played high school basketball for Zdravstveno uciliste Zagreb. Brzović also played two seasons in the Junior ABA League for the Cedevita Olimpija U19 Team, averaging 11.7 points and 7.7 rebounds per game during the 2018–19 season. He scored 15 points and grabbed 8 rebounds in the Semifinals of the 2019 League Championship. Brzovic played for the Krešimir Ćosić Cup with Cedevita in 2019–20, and later that year played for KK Bosco in the Prva Liga, before the season was cut short due to the COVID-19 pandemic.

== College career ==
=== Southeastern Oklahoma State ===
==== Freshman year ====
Brzović began his college career playing at Southeastern Oklahoma State in the Great American Conference at the Division II level. He helped lead the 2021–22 team to a regular season championship after averaging 17.8 points and 11.0 rebounds per game. After the season Brzović was named GAC Rookie of the Year and earned spots on the All-GAC First Team and the D2CCA All-Central Region Second Team.

=== Charleston ===
==== Sophomore year ====
For his sophomore season Brzović transferred to the Division I Charleston Cougars, and he quickly made his mark on the team after scoring 15 points against No. 1 North Carolina on November 11, 2022. He matched those 15 points one week later in the Charleston Classic Championship game, hitting back-to-back three's in the final moments of the game to defeat Virginia Tech and win the trophy. Brzović started 24 games throughout the season, helping to lead the 2022–23 Charleston Cougars to 31 wins, a record for the school's Division I era.

Brzović recorded three double-double's throughout the season, first at The Citadel (16 pts, 11 reb) on December 3, second at Towson (22 pts, 12 reb) on New Year's Eve, and third against Delaware (11 pts, 12 reb) on January 7, 2023. He scored a season-high 23 points against UNC Wilmington on February 8 and scored another 23 points five days later against Northeastern. Overall Brzović averaged 11.6 points, 0.9 assists, and 5.9 rebounds in 35 games, earning him a spot on the All-CAA Third Team.

All three games of the CAA Tournament saw Brzović score in the double-digits. He put up 15 points in the Quarterfinals against Stony Brook, 19 points in the Semifinals against Towson, and 16 points in the Championship against UNC Wilmington, all of which culminated in his being named to the CAA All-Tournament team. He scored 12 points and grabbed 8 rebounds against National Runner Up San Diego State in the first round of the 2023 NCAA Tournament.

==== Junior year ====
Coming in to the season Brzović was named to the All-CAA Preseason First Team. He led the 2023–24 Charleston Cougars with 16 points in the first game of the season against Iona on November 6, and recorded his fourth career double-double with 13 points and 10 rebounds against Duquesne on November 10, 2023. His fifth career double-double came on November 19 against Coastal Carolina, and he scored his 1,000th career point during a win against Rhode Island on December 10.

Brzović recorded three double-doubles in a week and a half, putting up 12 points and 12 rebounds against Monmouth on January 13, a season-high 27 points and 11 rebounds against UNC Wilmington on January 20, and a new career-high 31 points and 12 rebounds against Hampton on January 25, 2024. By the end of the season Brzović averaged 12.1 points, 2.4 assists, and 6.3 rebounds in 35 games, earning him a First Team All-CAA selection.

During the 2024 CAA Tournament Brzović averaged 11.0 points and 5.6 rebounds per game. He scored four points and grabbed eight rebounds against Final Four Team Alabama in the first round of the 2024 NCAA Tournament.

==== Senior year ====
Despite the departure of Head Coach Pat Kelsey, Brzović decided to return to the Cougars for his senior season under the leadership of new Head Coach Chris Mack. On October 18, Brzović was selected as the CAA Preseason Player of the Year, making him the third Cougar to earn the distinction, after Joe Chealey (2017) and Grant Riller (2019).

On November 8, during the first home game of the season, Brzović put up a career-high 34 points to lead his team to a victory over South Florida. After averaging 30.5 points on 63.9% shooting during the first week of the season, Brzović was named CAA Player of the Week for the first time in his career. He followed this up with a new career-high 39 point, 13 rebound performance in a double overtime thriller against Florida Atlantic on November 15, winning the game for the Cougars on a buzzer beater three point shot. Brzović earned two more Player of the Week distinctions throughout the season, first on January 6, 2025, after recording back-to-back double-doubles over Hampton and Towson, and again on February 10, after recording his league-leading eighth double-double of the year against Elon.

Brzović averaged 18.4 points, 8.1 rebounds, and 2.8 assists per game with a .544 shooting percentage through 33 games in his senior year, resulting in his second First Team All-CAA selection.

== Professional career ==
After going undrafted in the 2025 NBA draft, Brzović played for the Memphis Grizzlies during the 2025 NBA Summer League.

On August 9, 2025, Brzović signed a one-year deal to play for Vendée Challans Basket in the French Pro B League.

On September 23, 2025, he signed with Stal Ostrów Wielkopolski of the Polish Basketball League (PLK).

On March 5, 2026, Brzović signed with Zalakerámia ZTE KK of the Hungarian Nemzeti Bajnokság I/A (NB I/A).

== Career statistics ==
Legend
GP	Games played	GS	Games started	MPG	Minutes per game
FG%	Field goal percentage	3P%	3-point field goal percentage	FT%	Free throw percentage
RPG	Rebounds per game	APG	Assists per game	SPG	Steals per game
BPG	Blocks per game	PPG	Points per game	**Bold**	Career high

=== NCAA Division II ===
Year	Team	GP	GS	MPG	FG%	3P%	FT%	RPG	APG	SPG	BPG	PPG
2021–22	SE Oklahoma State	28	16	29.2	.528	.329	.725	11.0	1.8	0.4	0.5	17.8

=== NCAA Division I ===
Year	Team	GP	GS	MPG	FG%	3P%	FT%	RPG	APG	SPG	BPG	PPG
2022–23	Charleston	**35**	24	19.1	.461	.300	**.718**	5.9	0.9	0.7	0.5	11.6
2023–24	Charleston	**35**	30	22.6	.467	.221	.653	6.3	2.4	0.4	0.4	12.1
2024–25	Charleston	33	**33**	**32.6**	**.544**	**.322**	.669	**8.1**	**2.8**	**0.8**	**1.0**	**18.4**
Career		103	87	24.6	.496	.280	.679	6.7	2.0	0.7	0.6	13.9
