= Ryan Larson =

American basketball player (born 2000)

Personal information
- Born: June 8, 2000 (age 26) Saint Paul, Minnesota, U.S.
- Listed height: 6 ft 1 in (1.85 m)
- Listed weight: 181 lb (82 kg)

Career information
- High school: Cretin-Derham Hall (Saint Paul, Minnesota)
- College: Wofford (2018–2022); Charleston (2022–2023)
- NBA draft: 2023: undrafted
- Playing career: 2023–2024

Career history
- 2023: S.C. Lusitânia
- 2023–2024: BC Gargždai-SC
- 2024: CBet Jonava

Career highlights
- Third-team All-CAA (2023); CAA tournament MVP (2023)

Ryan Larson (born June 8, 2000) is an American former professional basketball player who last played for CBet Jonava of the Lithuanian Basketball League (LKL). He played college basketball for the Wofford Terriers and the Charleston Cougars.

== Early life ==
A Saint Paul, Minnesota native, Larson began playing basketball at a young age, and won the Class 2A State Championship in his sophomore year at Braham High School. Larson later transferred to Cretin-Durham Hall, helping to lead the 2017–18 team to a 24–2 record and a Class 4A State Championship.

== College career ==
=== Wofford (2018–2022) ===
Larson played for the Wofford Terriers for four years, and was an instrumental in the 2018–19 squad's 30-win season and appearance in the AP Top 25, both for the first time in program history. In only his freshman year, the Terriers won the 2019 SoCon tournament, and went on to defeat Seton Hall in the first round of the 2019 NCAA tournament.

Larson made 80 starts in 120 games for the Terriers, leading them to an 83–43 record over four years. He finished his career at Wofford with 624 points, 321 assists, 133 steals, and a spot on the 2020–21 Academic All-SoCon Team.

=== Charleston (2022–2023) ===
Larson transferred to the College of Charleston for his final year of eligibility, adding a veteran presence to the team as the 2022–23 Cougars won 31 games before qualifying for the 2023 NCAA tournament, a record for the school's Division I era. Larson quickly made his presence known after averaging 14.3 points on 56% shooting during the 2022 Charleston Classic Tournament, leading his team past Virginia Tech to a championship victory, and a tournament MVP for himself.

Throughout the season Larson averaged 10.6 points, 4.0 assists, and 1.6 steals per game, all career-highs, resulting in an All-CAA Third Team selection. In the 2023 CAA tournament championship game, Larson started a 12–0 run with back-to-back three-pointers to defeat UNC Wilmington. He had 23 points and four steals on the night, earning him a spot on the All-Tournament Team and the title of Tournament MVP. Larson's college career ended after scoring 11 points against national runner-up San Diego State in his second NCAA tournament appearance.

== Professional career ==
=== S.C. Lusitânia (2023) ===
In July 2023 Larson signed on to play for S.C. Lusitânia in the Liga Portuguesa de Basquetebol (LPB). He averaged 21.0 points and 7.3 assists in three games.

=== BC Gargždai-SC (2023–24) ===
Larson reunited with former Charleston player Jaylon Scott in October 2023, after joining BC Gargždai-SC in the Lithuanian Basketball League (LKL). He averaged 11.8 points, 6.1 assists, and 2.5 rebounds in thirteen games. Larson's stint with Gargždai ended suddenly in January 2024 after the team declared bankruptcy mid-season and was kicked out of the league.

=== CBet Jonava (2024) ===
Larson signed with another Lithuanian team, CBet Jonava, averaging 10.9 points and 3.2 assists across fifteen games to finish the season.

== Career statistics ==
Legend
GP	Games played	GS	Games started	MPG	Minutes per game
FG%	Field goal percentage	3P%	3-point field goal percentage	FT%	Free throw percentage
RPG	Rebounds per game	APG	Assists per game	SPG	Steals per game
BPG	Blocks per game	PPG	Points per game	**Bold**	Career high

=== College ===
Year	Team	GP	GS	MPG	FG%	3P%	FT%	RPG	APG	SPG	BPG	PPG
2018–19	Wofford	**35**	2	14.0	**.433**	.310	.789	1.2	2.2	0.8	0.0	3.0
2019–20	Wofford	32	29	21.3	.396	.292	.722	2.2	1.8	1.2	0.0	3.5
2020–21	Wofford	21	19	26.3	.426	**.455**	.643	**4.6**	3.2	1.1	**0.1**	5.9
2021–22	Wofford	32	32	**32.3**	.419	.386	**.816**	3.5	3.6	1.3	**0.1**	8.8
2022–23	Charleston	**35**	**35**	28.1	.420	.315	.772	3.3	**4.0**	**1.6**	**0.1**	**10.6**
Career		155	117	24.1	.419	.351	.758	2.8	3.0	1.2	0.1	6.4
