= BC Gargždai-SC =

Lithuanian Professional Basketball team

BC Gargždai
- League: Lithuanian Basketball League
- Founded: 2014
- History: BC Gargždai (2014–2024)
- Location: Gargždai, Lithuania
- Team colors: gold and black
- Championships: 1 NKL; 1 RKL; 1 RKL B Division
Home	Away

BC Gargždai was a professional basketball club based in Gargždai, Lithuania. The club won the 2021–22 National Basketball League championship, which saw them promoted to the Lithuanian Basketball League for the 2022–23 season. They played their home matches at Švyturys Arena in Klaipėda.

In February 2024, during the Lithuanian Basketball League season, the club declared bankruptcy and ceased all operations.

== Final roster ==
Note: Flags indicate national team eligibility at FIBA-sanctioned events. Players may hold other non-FIBA nationalities not displayed.

BC Gargždai roster
Players
Coaches

Pos.	No.	Nat.	Name	Ht.	Wt.	Age
G	0	(United States)	Scott, Jaylon	1.96 m (6 ft 5 in)	93 kg (205 lb)	25 – 28 July 2000
G	1	(Switzerland)	Mbala, Boris	1.90 m (6 ft 3 in)	88 kg (194 lb)	30 – 19 January 1996
G	6	(Lithuania)	Jonkus, Ernestas	1.87 m (6 ft 2 in)	85 kg (187 lb)	26 – 3 July 1999
F	8	(Lithuania)	Virkutis, Juozas	2.03 m (6 ft 8 in)	103 kg (227 lb)	20 – 31 January 2006
F	9	(Lithuania)	Urkis, Armandas	2.00 m (6 ft 7 in)	98 kg (216 lb)	27 – 10 January 1999
SG	10	(Lithuania)	Leščiauskas, Gediminas	1.96 m (6 ft 5 in)	95 kg (209 lb)	24 – 26 June 2001
PG	11	(United States)	Larson, Ryan	1.85 m (6 ft 1 in)	80 kg (176 lb)	25 – 8 June 2000
SF	12	(Lithuania)	Furmanavičius, Justas	1.99 m (6 ft 6 in)	95 kg (209 lb)	31 – 14 September 1994
PF	13	(Lithuania)	Majauskas, Aurimas	2.02 m (6 ft 8 in)	100 kg (220 lb)	32 – 11 May 1993
C	17	(Lithuania)	Kararinas, Tadas	2.08 m (6 ft 10 in)	108 kg (238 lb)	27 – 26 July 1998
PF	23	(Serbia)	Gavrilović, Ivan	2.04 m (6 ft 8 in)	103 kg (227 lb)	30 – 6 March 1996
PF	35	(Lithuania)	Kulikauskas, Paulius	2.03 m (6 ft 8 in)	95 kg (209 lb)	19 – 28 July 2006
C	44	(United States)	Ward, Nick	2.06 m (6 ft 9 in)	115 kg (254 lb)	28 – 2 September 1997
G	8	(France)	Ortega, Joris	1.88 m (6 ft 2 in)	80 kg (176 lb)	32 – 5 December 1993

Head coach

- (Lithuania) Laimonas Eglinskas

Assistant coach(es)

- (Lithuania) Lukas Aleksandravičius

Athletic trainer(s)

- (Lithuania) Žilvinas Kriukovas

Legend

- (C) Team captain
- Injured

- Roster
Updated: 22 October 2023

== Depth chart ==
Pos.	Starting 5	Bench 1	Bench 2
C	Nick Ward	Tadas Kararinas
PF	Ivan Gavrilović	Aurimas Majauskas	Paulius Kulikauskas
SF	Justas Furmanavičius	Amandas Urkis	Juozas Virkutis
SG	Ryan Larson	Boris Mbala	Deinas Kuodys
PG	Jaylon Scott	Ernestas Jonkus

== Club achievements ==
Season	League	Pos.
2021–22	NKL	1st
2022–23	LKL	11th
2023–24	LKL	n/a

== Junior team ==
BC Gargždai-2 participated in RKL B division (4th basketball division in Lithuania) since 2018.
