= 2022–23 Elon Phoenix men's basketball team =

American college basketball season

2022–23 Elon Phoenix men's basketball
- Conference: Colonial Athletic Association
- Record: 8–24 (6–12 CAA)
- Head coach: Billy Taylor (1st season)
- Assistant coaches: Greg Herenda; Josh Gross; Ryan Saunders
- Home arena: Schar Center

2022–23 CAA men's basketball standings
	Conf.				Overall
Team	W		L	PCT	W		L	PCT
Hofstra	16	–	2	.889	25	–	10	.714
Charleston †	16	–	2	.889	31	–	4	.886
Towson	12	–	6	.667	21	–	12	.636
UNC Wilmington	12	–	6	.667	24	–	10	.706
Drexel	10	–	8	.556	17	–	15	.531
Delaware	8	–	10	.444	17	–	16	.515
North Carolina A&T	8	–	10	.444	13	–	19	.406
William & Mary	7	–	11	.389	13	–	20	.394
Elon	6	–	12	.333	8	–	24	.250
Stony Brook	6	–	12	.333	11	–	22	.333
Northeastern	6	–	12	.333	10	–	20	.333
Hampton	5	–	13	.278	8	–	24	.250
Monmouth	5	–	13	.278	7	–	26	.212
† 2023 CAA tournament winner

The 2022–23 Elon Phoenix men's basketball team represented Elon University in the 2022–23 NCAA Division I men's basketball season. The Phoenix, led by first-year head coach Billy Taylor, played their home games at the Schar Center in Elon, North Carolina as members of the Colonial Athletic Association (CAA). The Phoenix finished the season 8–24, 6–12 in CAA play, to finish in a three-way tie for ninth place.

== Previous season ==
The Phoenix finished the 2021–22 season 10–22, 7–11 in CAA play, to finish in seventh place. They were defeated by UNC Wilmington in the quarterfinals of the CAA tournament. On April 5, head coach Mike Schrage announced his resignation after three years at the helm. On April 15, Iowa assistant coach Billy Taylor was announced as Schrage's successor.

== Roster ==
2022–23 Elon Phoenix men's basketball team
Players
Coaches

Pos.	#	Name	Height	Weight	Year	Previous school	Hometown
G	0	Sean Halloran	6 ft 0 in (1.83 m)	160 lb (73 kg)	GS	Belmont Abbey	Orlando, FL
G/F	2	JaDun Michael	6 ft 5 in (1.96 m)	198 lb (90 kg)	Jr	The Burlington School	Burlington, NC
G/F	3	Max Mackinnon	6 ft 5 in (1.96 m)	205 lb (93 kg)	Fr	Lake Ginninderra College	Brisbane, Australia
F/C	4	Sam Sherry	6 ft 10 in (2.08 m)	220 lb (100 kg)	So	Cumberland Valley HS	Mechanicsburg, PA
G/F	5	Torrence Watson	6 ft 5 in (1.96 m)	199 lb (90 kg)	GS	Missouri	St. Louis, MO
G	11	RJ Noord	6 ft 3 in (1.91 m)	170 lb (77 kg)	So	Heritage HS	Decatur, GA
F	13	Otto Luessenhop	6 ft 8 in (2.03 m)	190 lb (86 kg)	Fr	Northfield Mount Hermon	Amagansett, NY
G/F	14	Zac Ervin	6 ft 5 in (1.96 m)	201 lb (91 kg)	Sr	Gate City HS	Gate City, VA
G/F	21	Jerald Gillens-Butler	6 ft 5 in (1.96 m)	227 lb (103 kg)	GS	Butler	Orlando, FL
G	22	LA Pratt	6 ft 5 in (1.96 m)	185 lb (84 kg)	Fr	Lincoln Park HS	Columbus, OH
G	24	Austin Williams	6 ft 1 in (1.85 m)	175 lb (79 kg)	Fr	Glenelg Country School	Laurel, MD
C	30	Andrew Junkin	7 ft 0 in (2.13 m)	236 lb (107 kg)	RS Sr	Mississippi State	New Hope, MS
F	33	John III Bowen	6 ft 9 in (2.06 m)	215 lb (98 kg)	GS	UNC Wilmington	Bladenboro, NC
F	55	Deandre Smart	6 ft 6 in (1.98 m)	230 lb (104 kg)	Fr	Loomis Chaffee School	Savannah, GA

Head coach

- Billy Taylor (Notre Dame)

Assistant coach(es)

- Greg Herenda (Merrimack)
- Josh Gross (UNC Greensboro)
- Ryan Saunders (Barry)

Legend

- (C) Team captain
- (S) Suspended
- (I) Ineligible
- (W) Walk-on
- Injured
- Current redshirt

Roster
Last update: July 8, 2024

== Schedule and results ==
Date time, TV	Rank^{#}	Opponent^{#}	Result	Record	High points	High rebounds	High assists	Site (attendance) city, state
Non-conference regular season
November 7, 2022*; 7:00 p.m., FloHoops		Erskine	W 80–55	1–0	16 – Watson	9 – Watson	5 – Halloran	Schar Center (1,816); Elon, NC
November 11, 2022*; 8:30 p.m., ESPN+		vs. East Tennessee State; Asheville Championship semifinals	L 64–77	1–1	17 – Bowen	5 – Mackinnon	6 – Halloran	Harrah's Cherokee Center (575); Asheville, NC
November 13, 2022*; 2:00 p.m., ESPNU		vs. Harvard; Asheville Championship 3rd-place game	L 77–92	1–2	14 – 2 tied	7 – Smart	3 – 2 tied	Harrah's Cherokee Center; Asheville, NC
November 17, 2022*; 8:00 p.m., FloHoops		North Dakota	L 73–77	1–3	21 – Halloran	8 – Michael	3 – 2 tied	Schar Center (1,738); Elon, NC
November 19, 2022*; 1:00 p.m., ACCNX		at NC State	L 63–74	1–4	20 – Watson	8 – Watson	6 – Halloran	PNC Arena (11,351); Raleigh, NC
November 22, 2022*; 7:00 p.m., ESPN+		at Jacksonville State	L 53–78	1–5	16 – Ervin	4 – Bowen III	2 – 4 tied	Pete Mathews Coliseum (1,455); Jacksonville, AL
November 27, 2022*; 2:00 p.m., FloHoops		Radford	L 53–69	1–6	15 – Halloran	7 – Sherry	4 – Halloran	Schar Center (1,486); Elon, NC
November 30, 2022*; 7:00 p.m., ESPN+		at High Point	L 70–84	1–7	24 – Mackinnon	12 – Mackinnon	7 – Halloran	Qubein Center (4,872); High Point, NC
December 3, 2022*; 4:00 p.m., FloHoops		UNC Greensboro	L 61–65	1–8	21 – Halloran	9 – Bowen III	5 – Halloran	Schar Center (1,677); Elon, NC
December 11, 2022*; 2:00 p.m., FloHoops		Johnson & Wales (NC)	W 101–69	2–8	24 – Sherry	7 – 2 tied	11 – Halloran	Schar Center (1,297); Elon, NC
December 15, 2022*; 12:00 p.m., ESPN+		at Presbyterian	L 63–69	2–9	15 – Halloran	4 – Halloran	6 – Mackinnon	Templeton Physical Education Center (645); Clinton, SC
December 18, 2022*; 2:00 p.m., ESPN+		at Valparaiso	L 66–71	2–10	18 – Mackinnon	7 – Sherry	3 – 3 tied	Athletics–Recreation Center (1,057); Valparaiso, IN
December 20, 2022*; 7:00 p.m., BTN		at No. 18 Indiana	L 72–96	2–11	19 – Mackinnon	6 – Mackinnon	6 – Halloran	Simon Skjodt Assembly Hall (12,356); Bloomington, IN
CAA regular season
December 29, 2022; 4:00 p.m., FloHoops		at Drexel	L 50–62	2–12 (0–1)	11 – 2 tied	5 – 2 tied	3 – Mackinnon	Daskalakis Athletic Center (1,225); Philadelphia, PA
December 31, 2022; 2:00 p.m., FloHoops		at Delaware	L 52–57	2–13 (0–2)	18 – Ervin	8 – 2 tied	3 – Pratt	Bob Carpenter Center (1,895); Newark, DE
January 4, 2023; 7:00 p.m., FloHoops		UNC Wilmington	L 66–81	2–14 (0–3)	16 – Ervin	8 – Watson	2 – 4 tied	Schar Center (1,852); Elon, NC
January 11, 2023; 7:00 p.m., FloHoops		North Carolina A&T	L 71–80	2–15 (0–4)	15 – Watson	9 – Watson	5 – Halloran	Schar Center (1,804); Elon, NC
January 14, 2023; 4:00 p.m., FloHoops		at No. 22 College of Charleston	L 60–78	2–16 (0–5)	17 – Mackinnon	13 – Mackinnon	7 – Halloran	TD Arena (5,095); Charleston, SC
January 16, 2023; 7:00 p.m., FloHoops		at UNC Wilmington	L 54–62	2–17 (0–6)	20 – Ervin	10 – Bowen III	2 – 2 tied	Trask Coliseum (3,241); Wilmington, NC
January 21, 2023; 4:00 p.m., FloHoops		Towson	L 62–66	2–18 (0–7)	14 – Gillens-Butler	8 – Sherry	4 – Ervin	Schar Center (1,672); Elon, NC
January 26, 2023; 7:00 p.m., FloHoops		Hofstra	L 65–82	2–19 (0–8)	24 – Halloran	11 – Watson	6 – Mackinnon	Schar Center (1,493); Elon, NC
January 28, 2023; 4:00 p.m., FloHoops		Drexel	W 72–58	3–19 (1–8)	18 – Halloran	10 – Watson	5 – Halloran	Schar Center (1,911); Elon, NC
February 2, 2023; 7:00 p.m., FloHoops		at Stony Brook	W 69–55	4–19 (2–8)	19 – Gillens-Butler	8 – Mackinnon	7 – Halloran	Island Federal Arena (1,651); Stony Brook, NY
February 4, 2023; 2:00 p.m., FloHoops		at Northeastern	W 74–73	5–19 (3–8)	20 – Mackinnon	8 – Watson	8 – Mackinnon	Matthews Arena (1,322); Boston, MA
February 8, 2023; 7:00 p.m., FloHoops		at North Carolina A&T	L 61–66	5–20 (3–9)	17 – Watson	10 – Watson	4 – Halloran	Corbett Sports Center (2,903); Greensboro, NC
February 11, 2023; 2:00 p.m., FloHoops		William & Mary	W 66–55	6–20 (4–9)	22 – Mackinnon	9 – Mackinnon	3 – tied	Schar Center (2,467); Elon, NC
February 13, 2023; 9:00 p.m., CBSSN		Hampton	W 70–68	7–20 (5–9)	18 – Mackinnon	10 – Watson	7 – Halloran	Schar Center (1,673); Elon, NC
February 16, 2023; 7:00 p.m., FloHoops		College of Charleston	L 66–88	7–21 (5–10)	25 – Watson	9 – Watson	4 – Halloran	Schar Center (1,829); Elon, NC
February 18, 2023; 2:00 p.m., FloHoops		at Monmouth	W 75–68	8–21 (6–10)	16 – Halloran	10 – Mackinnon	7 – Mackinnon	OceanFirst Bank Center (2,106); West Long Branch, NJ
February 23, 2023; 7:00 p.m., FloHoops		at William & Mary	L 60–73	8–22 (6–11)	18 – Mackinnon	8 – Watson	2 – tied	Kaplan Arena (2,178); Williamsburg, VA
February 25, 2023; 7:00 p.m., FloHoops		Delaware	L 54–70	8–23 (6–12)	15 – Halloran	6 – Sherry	4 – Gillens-Butler	Schar Center (1,721); Elon, NC
CAA tournament
March 4, 2023; 12:00 p.m., FloHoops	(9)	vs. (8) William & Mary; Second round	L 51–73	8–24	15 – Sherry	12 – Sherry	3 – Watson	Entertainment and Sports Arena; Washington, D.C.
*Non-conference game. ^{#}Rankings from AP poll. (#) Tournament seedings in parentheses. All times are in Eastern.
