= Nick Ward (basketball) =

American basketball player (born 1997)

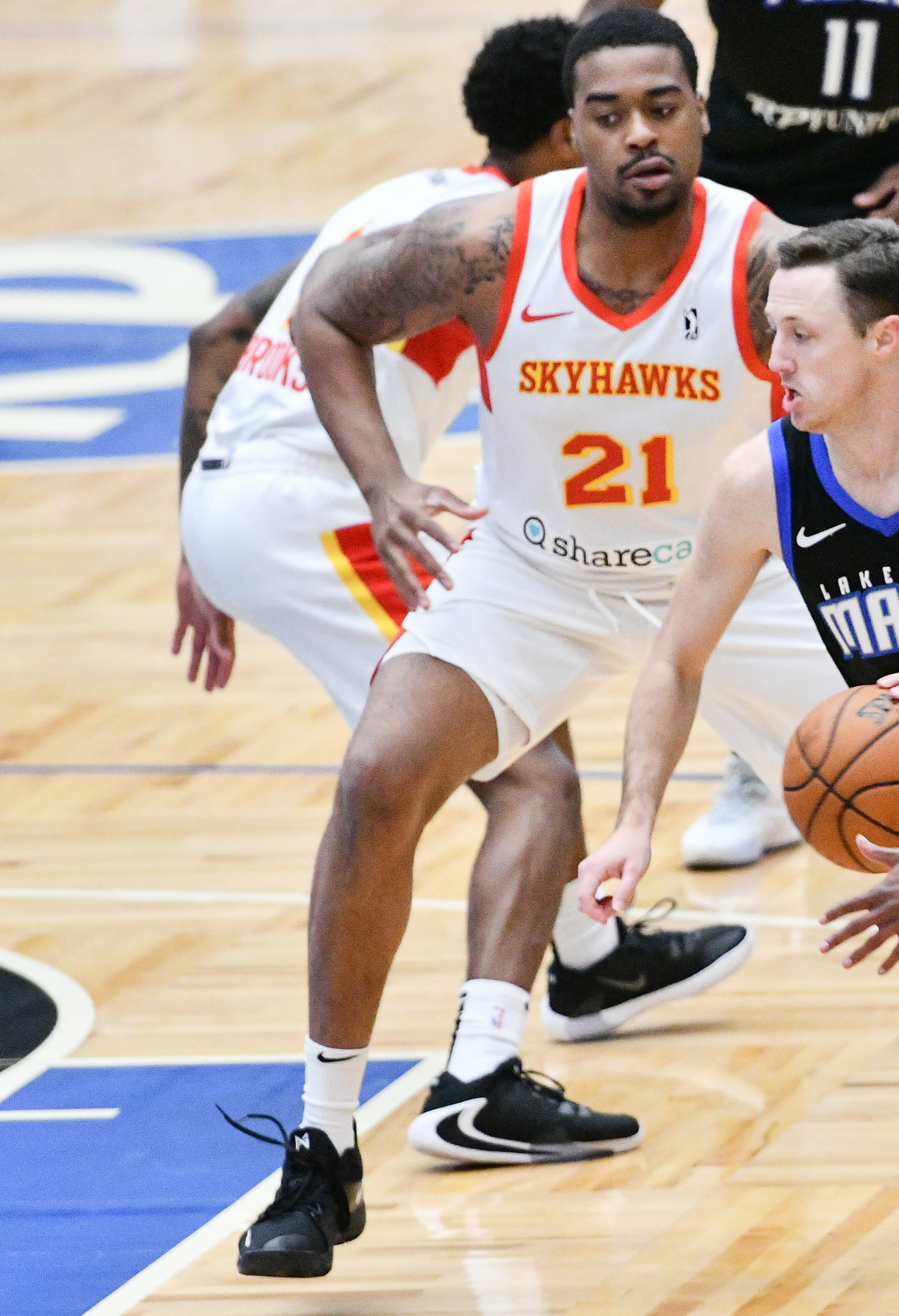
- Ward (21) in 2019

No. 32 – Santos del Potosí
- Position: Center
- League: LNBP

Personal information
- Born: September 2, 1997 (age 29)
- Listed height: 6 ft 9 in (2.06 m)
- Listed weight: 245 lb (111 kg)

Career information
- High school: Lincoln (Gahanna, Ohio)
- College: Michigan State (2016–2019)
- NBA draft: 2019: undrafted
- Playing career: 2019–present

Career history
- 2019: Fethiye Belediyespor
- 2019–2020: College Park Skyhawks
- 2020–2021: Istanbul Basket
- 2021: Ottawa Blackjacks
- 2021–2022: Básquet Coruña
- 2022–2023: Al-Najma
- 2023: Vancouver Bandits
- 2023: Sigal Prishtina
- 2023–2024: BC Gargždai
- 2024: Metropolitans 92
- 2024: Vancouver Bandits
- 2024–2025: Sporting CP
- 2025: Vancouver Bandits
- 2025-2026: Al Qurain
- 2026-present: Santos del Potosí

Career highlights
- 2× All-CEBL First Team (2021, 2024); Third-team All-Big Ten (2019)

Nicholas Jeffrey Ward (born September 2, 1997) is an American basketball player. He played college basketball for the Michigan State Spartans.

== High school career ==
Nick began playing basketball at a young age and shot the ball right handed despite being naturally left-handed. He starred at Lincoln High School in Gahanna, Ohio and averaged 21.0 points and 8.5 rebounds per game as a senior. He verbally committed to Michigan State in April 2015. Ward was a four-star prospect and a consensus top-50 recruit in the 2016 class.

== College career ==
=== Freshman ===
Ward had 18 points in Michigan State's home opener on November 18, 2016, versus Mississippi Valley State. He carried the Spartans against Oral Roberts on December 3, scoring 24 points and adding 10 rebounds. With Ward's career-high 25 points against Oakland on December 21, the Spartans were able to pull away from Oakland in the second half to win 77–65. Ward scored 22 points and grabbed 10 rebounds in a comeback win against Minnesota on December 27 in a game in which Miles Bridges sat out. He had 16 points in a loss to Penn State on January 7, 2018. On January 29, Ward contributed 13 points for the Spartans as they ended their three-game losing streak with a win over Michigan. He had 10 points in a win against Nebraska on February 2 despite suffering from the flu. On February 23 versus Nebraska, Ward and Bridges each had 20 points marking the first time since January 5, 1978, when Magic Johnson and Jay Vincent did it, that MSU had two freshmen score 20 points in a game. Ward's 22 points and nine rebounds led Michigan State to a victory against Wisconsin on February 27. He had 22 points and career-high 16 rebounds in a loss to Maryland on March 3.

Ward scored 15 points and added 11 rebounds but struggled defensively in a loss to Minnesota in the Big Ten tournament. In the NCAA Tournament, Ward had 19 points in a 78–58 win over Miami. Ward contributed 13 points in a second round loss to Kansas, but suffered foul trouble that limited his effectiveness. At the conclusion of the regular season, he was a Big Ten Honorable Mention by the coaches and media. He averaged 13.9 points on 59.2 percent shooting and grabbed 6.5 rebounds per game as a freshman.

=== Sophomore ===
Coming into his sophomore season, Ward was named to the preseason All-Big Ten team. He added 16 points in the opening game win against North Florida. The following game, Ward scored 19 points in a loss to Duke in Chicago. Ward led all scorers with 22 points in a 93–71 win against Stony Brook on November 19. In a win against Nebraska on December 3, Ward was in foul trouble but managed to score 22 points in 16 minutes to lead the Spartans. He was perfect from the field in scoring 20 points in an easy win against Houston Baptist on December 18. Ward made seven of his eight shots, scoring 22 points and grabbed 15 rebounds in a win against Cleveland State on December 28. He followed that up with 21 points in a 108–52 win against Savannah State and was named Big Ten player of the week on January 2, 2018. Ward contributed 18 points and 13 rebounds in a win versus Indiana on January 19. He scored 17 points in only 12 minutes in a win against Iowa on February 6, missed much of the second half with four fouls.

At the conclusion of the regular season, Ward was named to the All-Big Ten Third Team by the media. He was an All-Big Ten Honorable Mention by the coaches. As a sophomore, Ward posted 12.4 points and 7.1 rebounds per game. His 64.8 field goal percentage was second-best in the Big Ten. On March 29, Ward announced he would enter the 2018 NBA draft, but he would not sign with an agent. He withdrew from the draft on May 29.

=== Junior ===
Once again Ward was named to the preseason All-Big Ten team. In the opening game of the season against Kansas Ward scored 9 points, and in the following game against Florida Gulf Coast he scored 25 points. In the next game against Louisiana-Monroe Ward scored just 4 points, but Ward rebounded in the next game against Tennessee Tech by scoring 23 points. At the Las Vegas Invitational Ward scored 16 and 6 against UCLA and Texas respectively. In the ACC/Big Ten Challenge game against Louisville Ward scored 14 points. Ward continued to produce in the Spartans next game against Rutgers, scoring 20 points to open Big Ten play. In MSU's December 12 meeting with Iowa, Ward was a perfect from the field scoring 26 points. The Spartans next game was at Florida, where Ward scored 13 points. Ward put up 28 points against Green Bay and 14 points against Oakland In the following game against Northern Illinois, Ward scored 11 points. Big Ten play resumed for the Spartans on January 2 against Northwestern and Ward scored 21 points. In the Spartans' game against Ohio State on February 17, Ward scored 9 points before injuring his left hand, resulting in him missing multiple games. He would return for the 2019 postseason (that year's Big Ten tournament and NCAA tournament) where he averaged just 13 minutes per game, 5.8 points, and 4.1 rebounds over eight games as the Spartans won the Big Ten tournament and made it to the NCAA Final Four.

== Professional career ==
On June 21, 2019, Ward signed with the Atlanta Hawks to play for their NBA Summer League team.

On September 2, 2019, Ward signed his first professional contract with Hapoel Gilboa Galil of the Israeli Premier League. On September 25, 2019, he parted ways with Gilboa Galil after appearing in one pre-season tournament game.

On September 28, 2019, Ward signed with Fethiye Belediyespor of the Turkish Basketball First League. In 4 games played for Belediyespor, he averaged 22 points and 6.2 rebounds per game. On November 15, 2019, Ward parted ways with Belediyespor.

On November 15, 2019, Ward signed with the College Park Skyhawks of the NBA G League. Ward posted 22 points and 18 rebounds in a loss to the Grand Rapids Drive on January 15, 2020. He averaged 13.2 points and 6.5 rebounds per game for the Skyhawks.

On October 25, 2020, Ward signed with Istanbul Basket of the Turkish Basketball First League.

On March 26, 2021, Ward signed with the Ottawa Blackjacks of the Canadian Elite Basketball League. In October, he signed with Básquet Coruña of the LEB Oro.

On August 21, 2023, Ward signed with Sigal Prishtina of the Kosovo Basketball Superleague. On October 13, he signed with BC Gargždai of the Lithuanian Basketball League (LKL).

On September 2, 2024, Ward signed with Sporting CP of the Liga Portuguesa de Basquetebol.

== The Basketball Tournament ==
Ward joined Big X, a team composed primarily of former Big Ten players in The Basketball Tournament 2020. He led Big X with 18 points in a 79–74 win over alternate D2 in the first round.

== Career statistics ==
Legend
GP	Games played	GS	Games started	MPG	Minutes per game
FG%	Field goal percentage	3P%	3-point field goal percentage	FT%	Free throw percentage
RPG	Rebounds per game	APG	Assists per game	SPG	Steals per game
BPG	Blocks per game	PPG	Points per game	**Bold**	Career high

=== College ===
Year	Team	GP	GS	MPG	FG%	3P%	FT%	RPG	APG	SPG	BPG	PPG
2016–17	Michigan State	**35**	21	19.8	.592	–	.615	6.5	.4	**.3**	**1.5**	**13.9**
2017–18	Michigan State	**35**	**34**	18.9	**.648**	**1.000**	.621	**7.1**	.5	**.3**	1.3	12.4
2018–19	Michigan State	34	25	**20.8**	.580	**1.000**	**.653**	6.1	**.7**	**.3**	1.2	12.9
Career		104	80	19.8	.605	1.000	.629	6.6	.5	.3	1.4	13.1
