= 2022–23 Hampton Pirates basketball team =

American college basketball season

2022–23 Hampton Pirates basketball
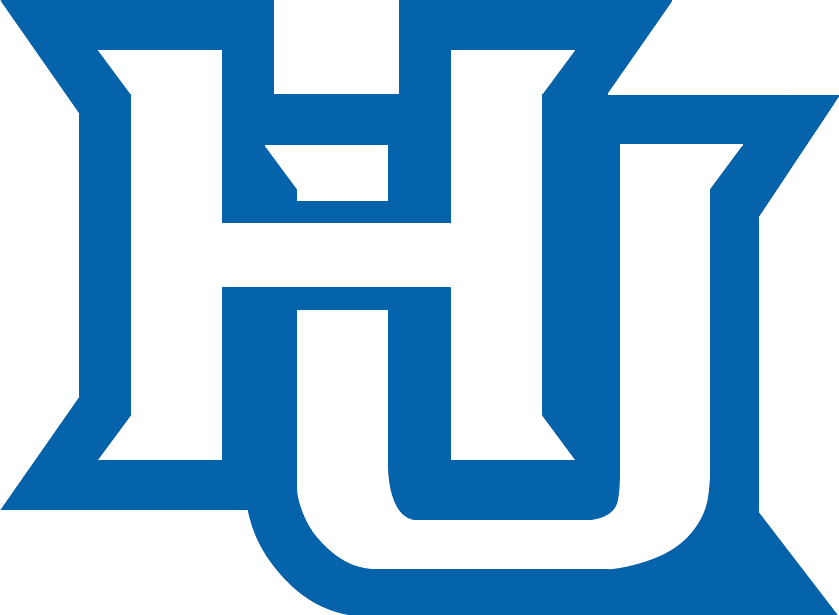
- Conference: Colonial Athletic Association
- Record: 8–24 (5–13 CAA)
- Head coach: Edward Joyner (14th season)
- Associate head coach: Darryl Sharp
- Assistant coaches: Matthew Hamilton; Keith Coutreyer
- Home arena: Hampton Convocation Center

2022–23 CAA men's basketball standings
	Conf.				Overall
Team	W		L	PCT	W		L	PCT
Hofstra	16	–	2	.889	25	–	10	.714
Charleston †	16	–	2	.889	31	–	4	.886
Towson	12	–	6	.667	21	–	12	.636
UNC Wilmington	12	–	6	.667	24	–	10	.706
Drexel	10	–	8	.556	17	–	15	.531
Delaware	8	–	10	.444	17	–	16	.515
North Carolina A&T	8	–	10	.444	13	–	19	.406
William & Mary	7	–	11	.389	13	–	20	.394
Elon	6	–	12	.333	8	–	24	.250
Stony Brook	6	–	12	.333	11	–	22	.333
Northeastern	6	–	12	.333	10	–	20	.333
Hampton	5	–	13	.278	8	–	24	.250
Monmouth	5	–	13	.278	7	–	26	.212
† 2023 CAA tournament winner

The 2022–23 Hampton Pirates men's basketball team represented Hampton University in the 2022–23 NCAA Division I men's basketball season. The Pirates, led by 14th-year head coach Edward Joyner, played their home games at the Hampton Convocation Center in Hampton, Virginia as first-year members of the Colonial Athletic Association (CAA).

The Pirates finished the season 8–24, 5–13 in CAA play, to finish in tied for sixth place. They were defeated by Monmouth in the first round of the CAA tournament.

== Previous season ==
The Pirates finished the 2021–22 season 9–19, 5–11 in Big South play, to finish in last place in the North division. As the No. 10 seed in the Big South tournament, they lost to High Point in the first round.

The season marked the school's last season as a member of the Big South Conference, as the Pirates joined the Colonial Athletic Association in 2022.

== Roster ==
2022–23 Hampton Pirates men's basketball team
Players
Coaches

Pos.	#	Name	Height	Weight	Year	Previous school	Hometown
G	0	Marquis Godwin	6 ft 5 in (1.96 m)	195 lb (88 kg)	Sr	Old Dominion	Hampton, VA
G	1	Russell (Deuce) Dean	6 ft 5 in (1.96 m)	200 lb (91 kg)	Sr	York Prep	Columbia, SC
F	3	Kyrese Mullen	6 ft 7 in (2.01 m)	230 lb (104 kg)	Fr	Massanutten Military Academy	Norfolk, VA
G/F	4	Raymond Jr. Bethea	6 ft 5 in (1.96 m)	200 lb (91 kg)	Sr	Howard	Atlantic City, NJ
G	5	Jordan Nesbitt	6 ft 6 in (1.98 m)	210 lb (95 kg)	So	Saint Louis	St. Louis, MO
G	11	Amir Nesbitt	6 ft 1 in (1.85 m)	180 lb (82 kg)	So	Miller School	Newport News, VA
G	12	Quentin Livingston	6 ft 4 in (1.93 m)	185 lb (84 kg)	Fr	King's Fork HS	Suffolk, VA
G	13	Tre Thomas	6 ft 2 in (1.88 m)	180 lb (82 kg)	Fr	Spire Institute	Washington, D.C.
G/F	20	Tyler Chatman	6 ft 3 in (1.91 m)	180 lb (82 kg)	Jr	King's Fork HS	Suffolk, VA
F	21	Luc Therrien	6 ft 10 in (2.08 m)	220 lb (100 kg)	So	Bull City Prep	Vancouver, BC
G/F	23	Daniel Banister	6 ft 5 in (1.96 m)	190 lb (86 kg)	Jr	Cape Henry Collegiate	Chesapeake, VA
G/F	25	Bryce Earle	6 ft 0 in (1.83 m)	160 lb (73 kg)	Sr	Cardinal Newman HS	Columbia, SC
G	30	Ishan Duncan	6 ft 1 in (1.85 m)	200 lb (91 kg)	Fr	Hampton HS	Hampton, VA
F	33	Toure Banks	6 ft 6 in (1.98 m)	215 lb (98 kg)	Sr	Friends' Central School	Philadelphia, PA
F	50	Najee Thomas	6 ft 10 in (2.08 m)	210 lb (95 kg)	Sr	Brunswick CC	Fayetteville, NC

Head coach

- Edward Joyner (Hampton)

Assistant coach(es)

- Darryl Sharp (Bloomsburg)
- Matthew Hamilton (Appalachian State)
- Keith Coutreyer (Washington Adventist)

Legend

- (C) Team captain
- (S) Suspended
- (I) Ineligible
- (W) Walk-on
- Injured
- Current redshirt

Roster
Last update: November 21, 2022

== Schedule and results ==
Date time, TV	Rank^{#}	Opponent^{#}	Result	Record	Site (attendance) city, state
Regular season
November 9, 2022*; 7:00 p.m., ESPN+		at James Madison	L 58–106	0–1	Atlantic Union Bank Center (3,768); Harrisonburg, VA
November 12, 2022*; 8:00 p.m., FloHoops		Regent	W 89–60	1–1	Hampton Convocation Center; Hampton, VA
November 16, 2022*; 7:00 p.m., ESPN+		at East Carolina	L 73–82	1–2	Williams Arena (4,054); Greenville, NC
November 21, 2022*; 9:00 p.m., ESPN+		at UC Santa Barbara; Santa Barbara Beach Classic	L 66–79	1–3	The Thunderdome; Santa Barbara, CA
November 22, 2022*; 3:00 p.m., ESPN+		vs. North Alabama; Santa Barbara Beach Classic	L 74–75	1–4	The Thunderdome (53); Santa Barbara, CA
November 26, 2022*; 12:30 p.m., ACCN		at Wake Forest	L 70–97	1–5	LJVM Coliseum (5,151); Winston-Salem, NC
November 30, 2022*; 7:00 p.m., SECN+/ESPN+		at Georgia	L 54–73	1–6	Stegeman Coliseum (5,911); Athens, GA
December 3, 2022*; 5:00 p.m., FloHoops		Howard	W 74–65	2–6	Hampton Convocation Center; Hampton, VA
December 7, 2022*; 7:00 p.m., FloHoops		Loyola (MD)	W 65–61	3–6	Hampton Convocation Center (263); Hampton, VA
December 11, 2022*; 4:00 p.m., FloHoops		Bowling Green	L 72–86	3–7	Hampton Convocation Center (2,103); Hampton, VA
December 17, 2022*; 4:00 p.m., ESPN+		vs. Norfolk State; Boost Mobile HBCU Challenge hosted by Chris Paul	L 66–78	3–8	MGM Grand Garden Arena; Las Vegas, NV
December 18, 2022*; 4:30 p.m., ESPNU		vs. Texas Southern; Boost Mobile HBCU Challenge hosted by Chris Paul	L 77–82	3–9	MGM Grand Garden Arena (2,029); Las Vegas, NV
December 29, 2022; 7:00 p.m., FloHoops		at College of Charleston	L 61–89	3–10 (0–1)	TD Arena (5,045); Charleston, SC
December 31, 2022; 2:00 p.m., FloHoops		at UNC Wilmington	L 65–82	3–11 (0–2)	Trask Coliseum (3,667); Wilmington, NC
January 5, 2023; 7:00 p.m., FloHoops		Hofstra	L 51–67	3–12 (0–3)	Hampton Convocation Center (147); Hampton, VA
January 7, 2023; 4:00 p.m., FloHoops		Northeastern	L 63–79	3–13 (0–4)	Hampton Convocation Center; Hampton, VA
January 11, 2023; 7:00 p.m., FloHoops		at William & Mary	L 65–81	3–14 (0–5)	Kaplan Arena (2,015); Williamsburg, VA
January 16, 2023; 7:00 p.m., FloHoops		North Carolina A&T	L 67–79	3–15 (0–6)	Hampton Convocation Center (3,825); Hampton, VA
January 19, 2023; 7:00 p.m., FloHoops		at Drexel	L 73–79	3–16 (0–7)	Daskalakis Athletic Center (1,173); Philadelphia, PA
January 21, 2023; 2:30 p.m., FloHoops		at Monmouth	W 83–66	4–16 (1–7)	OceanFirst Bank Center (1,466); West Long Branch, NJ
January 26, 2023; 7:00 p.m., FloHoops		Delaware	W 67–66	5–16 (2–7)	Hampton Convocation Center (2,705); Hampton, VA
January 28, 2023; 4:00 p.m., FloHoops		Stony Brook	L 66–71	5–17 (2–8)	Hampton Convocation Center; Hampton, VA
February 2, 2023; 7:00 p.m., FloHoops		William & Mary	W 62–57	6–17 (3–8)	Hampton Convocation Center (1,112); Hampton, VA
February 4, 2023*; 5:00 p.m., TNT		vs. Norfolk State; Invesco QQQ Legacy Classic	L 71–83	6–18	Prudential Center (13,451); Newark, NJ
February 8, 2023; 7:00 p.m., FloHoops		at Towson	L 72–86	6–19 (3–9)	SECU Arena (2,140); Towson, MD
February 11, 2023; 4:00 p.m., FloHoops		College of Charleston	L 70–83	6–20 (3–10)	Hampton Convocation Center; Hampton, VA
February 13, 2023; 9:00 p.m., CBSSN		at Elon	L 68–70	6–21 (3–11)	Schar Center (1,673); Elon, NC
February 16, 2023; 7:00 p.m., FloHoops		at Hofstra	L 43–73	6–22 (3–12)	Mack Sports Complex (1,833); Hempstead, NY
February 18, 2023; 4:00 p.m., FloHoops		Drexel	W 75–72	7–22 (4–12)	Hampton Convocation Center; Hampton, VA
February 23, 2023; 7:00 p.m., FloHoops		Monmouth	W 86–81	8–22 (5–12)	Hampton Convocation Center (1,537); Hampton, VA
February 25, 2023; 2:00 p.m., FloHoops		at North Carolina A&T	L 72–73 ^{OT}	8–23 (5–13)	Corbett Sports Center (3,002); Greensboro, NC
CAA tournament
March 3, 2023; 2:00 p.m., FloHoops	(12)	vs. (13) Monmouth; First round	L 64–100	8–24	Entertainment and Sports Arena (1,529); Washington, D.C.
*Non-conference game. ^{#}Rankings from AP poll. (#) Tournament seedings in parentheses. All times are in Eastern.
