= 2022–23 Monmouth Hawks men's basketball team =

American college basketball season

2022–23 Monmouth Hawks men's basketball
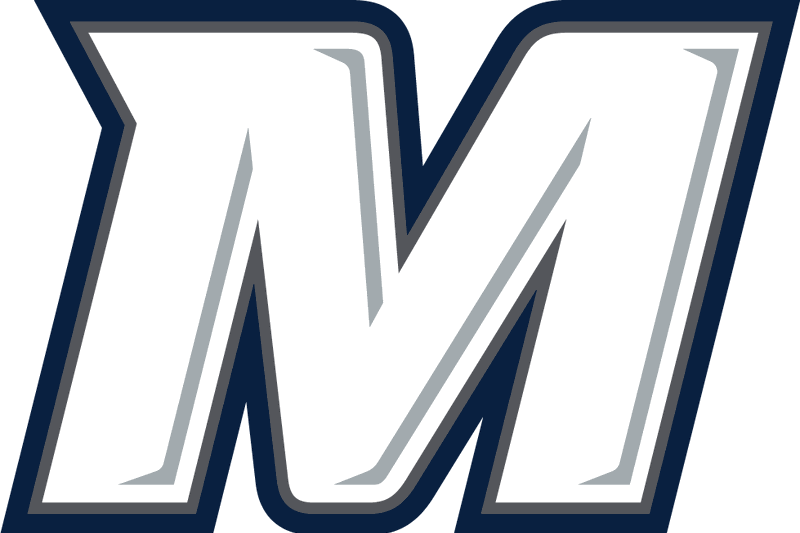
- Conference: Colonial Athletic Association
- Record: 7–26 (5–13 CAA)
- Head coach: King Rice (12th season)
- Assistant coaches: Rick Callahan; Brian Reese; Clive Bentick
- Home arena: OceanFirst Bank Center

2022–23 CAA men's basketball standings
	Conf.				Overall
Team	W		L	PCT	W		L	PCT
Hofstra	16	–	2	.889	25	–	10	.714
Charleston †	16	–	2	.889	31	–	4	.886
Towson	12	–	6	.667	21	–	12	.636
UNC Wilmington	12	–	6	.667	24	–	10	.706
Drexel	10	–	8	.556	17	–	15	.531
Delaware	8	–	10	.444	17	–	16	.515
North Carolina A&T	8	–	10	.444	13	–	19	.406
William & Mary	7	–	11	.389	13	–	20	.394
Elon	6	–	12	.333	8	–	24	.250
Stony Brook	6	–	12	.333	11	–	22	.333
Northeastern	6	–	12	.333	10	–	20	.333
Hampton	5	–	13	.278	8	–	24	.250
Monmouth	5	–	13	.278	7	–	26	.212
† 2023 CAA tournament winner

The 2022–23 Monmouth Hawks men's basketball team represented Monmouth University in the 2022–23 NCAA Division I men's basketball season. The Hawks, led by twelfth-year head coach King Rice, played their home games at OceanFirst Bank Center in West Long Branch, New Jersey, as first-year members of the Colonial Athletic Association (CAA). They finished the season 7–26, and 5–13 in CAA play to finish in 13th (and last) place.

== Previous season ==
The Hawks finished the 2021–22 season 21–13, 11–9 in Metro Atlantic Athletic Conference (MAAC) play, to finish in fourth place. In the MAAC tournament, they defeated Niagara and Rider, before falling to Saint Peter's in the championship game. This was the team's final season as a member of the Metro Atlantic Athletic Conference, as they moved to the Colonial Athletic Association, starting in the 2022–23 season.

== Roster ==
2022–23 Monmouth Hawks men's basketball team
Players
Coaches

Pos.	#	Name	Height	Weight	Year	Previous school	Hometown
G	1	Jayden Doyle	6 ft 4 in (1.93 m)	185 lb (84 kg)	So	South Kent School	Knoxville, TN
F	2	Jaret Valencia	6 ft 9 in (2.06 m)	180 lb (82 kg)	Fr	Legacy SSS	Quibdó, Colombia
G	3	Jakari Spence	6 ft 2 in (1.88 m)	165 lb (75 kg)	Jr	Robert Morris	Toms River, NJ
G	4	Andrew Ball	6 ft 6 in (1.98 m)	185 lb (84 kg)	Fr	Shawnee High School	Marlton, NJ
F	5	Myles Foster	6 ft 7 in (2.01 m)	235 lb (107 kg)	Jr	Brooks School	Brooklyn, New York
F	10	Jarvis Vaughan	6 ft 9 in (2.06 m)	220 lb (100 kg)	Sr	Massanutten Military Academy	Staunton, VA
G	13	Jack Collins	6 ft 5 in (1.96 m)	195 lb (88 kg)	Fr	The Phelps School	Manasquan, NJ
G	14	Jack Holmstrom	6 ft 6 in (1.98 m)	190 lb (86 kg)	Jr	Guilford High School	Rockford, IL
C	15	Tadhg Crowley	6 ft 10 in (2.08 m)	230 lb (104 kg)	So	Trinity-Pawling School	Yonkers, NY
G	20	Tahron Allen	6 ft 5 in (1.96 m)	200 lb (91 kg)	So	Brooklyn Collegiate High School	Brooklyn, NY
G	24	Myles Ruth	6 ft 0 in (1.83 m)	160 lb (73 kg)	Jr	Don Bosco Prep	Hillside, NJ
G	30	Sam Fagan	6 ft 1 in (1.85 m)	170 lb (77 kg)	So	Neptune High School	Lake Como, NJ
C	33	Amaan Sandhu	7 ft 1 in (2.16 m)	255 lb (116 kg)	Fr	First Love Christian Academy	Punjab, India
F	35	Klemen Vuga	6 ft 9 in (2.06 m)	230 lb (104 kg)	Jr	Virginia Episcopal School	Mengeš, Slovenia

Head coach

- King Rice (North Carolina)

Assistant coach(es)

- Rick Callahan (Salem International)
- Brian Reese (North Carolina)
- Clive Bentick (Canisius)

Legend

- (C) Team captain
- (S) Suspended
- (I) Ineligible
- (W) Walk-on
- Injured
- Current redshirt

Roster
Last update: January 12, 2023

== Schedule and results ==
Date time, TV	Rank^{#}	Opponent^{#}	Result	Record	Site (attendance) city, state
Non-conference regular season
November 9, 2022*; 8:00 p.m., FS1		at Seton Hall	L 52–79	0–1	Prudential Center (8,626); Newark, NJ
November 11, 2022*; 9:00 p.m., YES/ACC RSN		at No. 18 Virginia; Continental Tire Main Event on-campus game	L 42–89	0–2	John Paul Jones Arena (13,487); Charlottesville, VA
November 14, 2022*; 9:00 p.m., BTN		at No. 19 Illinois; Continental Tire Main Event on-campus game	L 65–103	0–3	State Farm Center (13,772); Champaign, IL
November 17, 2022*; 7:00 p.m., FloHoops/SNY		Norfolk State; Continental Tire Main Event on-campus game	L 59–64	0–4	OceanFirst Bank Center (1,669); West Long Branch, NJ
November 21, 2022*; 7:00 p.m., ESPN+		at Colgate	L 66–85	0–5	Cotterell Court (684); Hamilton, NY
November 25, 2022*; 2:00 p.m., FloHoops		Cornell	L 63–81	0–6	OceanFirst Bank Center (1,526); West Long Branch, NJ
November 27, 2022*; 7:00 p.m., ESPN+		at Lehigh	L 76–80	0–7	Stabler Arena (531); Bethlehem, PA
November 30, 2022*; 8:00 p.m., ESPN+		at Rider	L 62–88	0–8	Alumni Gymnasium (1,650); Lawrenceville, NJ
December 4, 2022*; 2:00 p.m., ESPN+		at Manhattan	W 76–69	1–8	Draddy Gymnasium (628); Riverdale, NY
December 10, 2022*; 7:00 p.m., ESPN+		at Princeton	L 54–91	1–9	Jadwin Gymnasium (1,372); Princeton, NJ
December 12, 2022*; 8:00 p.m., ACCN		at Syracuse	L 71–86	1–10	JMA Wireless Dome (19,262); Syracuse, NY
December 17, 2022*; 2:00 p.m., FloHoops/SNY/NBCSPHI		Charlotte	L 46–80	1–11	OceanFirst Bank Center (1,470); West Long Branch, NJ
December 22, 2022*; 7:00 p.m., FloHoops/SNY/NBCSPHI		Yale	L 44–76	1–12	OceanFirst Bank Center (1,296); West Long Branch, NJ
CAA regular season
December 28, 2022; 5:00 p.m., CBSSN		UNC Wilmington	L 55–68	1–13 (0–1)	OceanFirst Bank Center (1,754); West Long Branch, NJ
January 5, 2023; 7:00 p.m., FloHoops		Stony Brook	L 56–67	1–14 (0–2)	OceanFirst Bank Center (1,224); West Long Branch, NJ
January 7, 2023; 2:00 p.m., FloHoops		at Drexel	L 35–67	1–15 (0–3)	Daskalakis Athletic Center (984); Philadelphia, PA
January 11, 2023; 7:00 p.m., FloHoops		at Hofstra	L 57–77	1–16 (0–4)	Mack Sports Complex (1,427); Hempstead, NY
January 14, 2023; 3:00 p.m., CBSSN		at Towson	L 48–68	1–17 (0–5)	SECU Arena (1,801); Towson, MD
January 19, 2023; 7:00 p.m., FloHoops		No. 18 College of Charleston	L 55–69	1–18 (0–6)	OceanFirst Bank Center (1,478); West Long Branch, NJ
January 21, 2023; 2:30 p.m., FloHoops/SNY		Hampton	L 66–83	1–19 (0–7)	OceanFirst Bank Center (1,433); West Long Branch, NJ
January 26, 2023; 7:00 p.m., FloHoops		at UNC Wilmington	L 49–52	1–20 (0–8)	Trask Coliseum (3,503); Wilmington, NC
January 28, 2023; 2:00 p.m., FloHoops		at North Carolina A&T	W 79–64	2–20 (1–8)	Corbett Sports Center (1,555); Greensboro, NC
February 2, 2023; 7:00 p.m., FloHoops		Delaware	W 70–62	3–20 (2–8)	OceanFirst Bank Center (1,597); West Long Branch, NJ
February 4, 2023; 2:00 p.m., FloHoops/SNY/NBCSPHI		Drexel	W 69–67	4–20 (3–8)	OceanFirst Bank Center (1,562); West Long Branch, NJ
February 8, 2023; 6:30 p.m., FloHoops		at Stony Brook	W 61–54	5–20 (4–8)	Island Federal Arena (2,070); Stony Brook, NY
February 11, 2023; 2:00 p.m., FloHoops/SNY		Hofstra	L 57–86	5–21 (4–9)	OceanFirst Bank Center (2,109); West Long Branch, NJ
February 13, 2023; 7:00 p.m., FloHoops/SNY/NBCSPHI		North Carolina A&T	W 85–71	6–21 (5–9)	OceanFirst Bank Center (1,394); West Long Branch, NJ
February 16, 2023; 7:00 p.m., FloHoops/NESN+		at Northeastern	L 62–77	6–22 (5–10)	Matthews Arena (583); Boston, MA
February 18, 2023; 2:00 p.m., FloHoops/SNY/NBCSPHI		Elon	L 68–75	6–23 (5–11)	OceanFirst Bank Center (2,106); West Long Branch, NJ
February 23, 2023; 7:00 p.m., FloHoops		at Hampton	L 81–86	6–24 (5–12)	Hampton Convocation Center (1,537); Hampton, VA
February 25, 2023; 2:00 p.m., FloHoops		at William & Mary	L 62–74	6–25 (5–13)	Kaplan Arena (3,470); Williamsburg, VA
CAA tournament
March 3, 2023; 2:00 p.m., FloHoops	(13)	vs. (12) Hampton; First round	W 100–64	7–25	Entertainment and Sports Arena (1,529); Washington, D.C.
March 4, 2023; 2:30 p.m., FloHoops	(13)	vs. (5) Drexel; Second round	L 45–64	7–26	Entertainment and Sports Arena (2,031); Washington, D.C.
*Non-conference game. ^{#}Rankings from AP poll. (#) Tournament seedings in parentheses. All times are in Eastern.

== See also ==
- 2022–23 Monmouth Hawks women's basketball team
