= 2022–23 William & Mary Tribe men's basketball team =

American college basketball season

2022–23 William & Mary Tribe men's basketball
- Conference: Colonial Athletic Association
- Record: 13–20 (7–11 CAA)
- Head coach: Dane Fischer (4th season)
- Assistant coaches: Mike Howland; Julian Boatner; Nate Bollinger
- Home arena: Kaplan Arena

2022–23 CAA men's basketball standings
| | Conf. | | | | Overall |
| Team | W | | L | PCT | W | | L | PCT |
|---|---|---|---|---|---|---|---|---|
| Hofstra | 16 | – | 2 | .889 | 25 | – | 10 | .714 |
| Charleston † | 16 | – | 2 | .889 | 31 | – | 4 | .886 |
| Towson | 12 | – | 6 | .667 | 21 | – | 12 | .636 |
| UNC Wilmington | 12 | – | 6 | .667 | 24 | – | 10 | .706 |
| Drexel | 10 | – | 8 | .556 | 17 | – | 15 | .531 |
| Delaware | 8 | – | 10 | .444 | 17 | – | 16 | .515 |
| North Carolina A&T | 8 | – | 10 | .444 | 13 | – | 19 | .406 |
| William & Mary | 7 | – | 11 | .389 | 13 | – | 20 | .394 |
| Elon | 6 | – | 12 | .333 | 8 | – | 24 | .250 |
| Stony Brook | 6 | – | 12 | .333 | 11 | – | 22 | .333 |
| Northeastern | 6 | – | 12 | .333 | 10 | – | 20 | .333 |
| Hampton | 5 | – | 13 | .278 | 8 | – | 24 | .250 |
| Monmouth | 5 | – | 13 | .278 | 7 | – | 26 | .212 |
† 2023 CAA tournament winner

The 2022–23 William & Mary Tribe men's basketball team represented the College of William & Mary in the 2022–23 NCAA Division I men's basketball season. The Tribe, led by fourth-year head coach Dane Fischer, played their home games at Kaplan Arena in Williamsburg, Virginia as members of the Colonial Athletic Association (CAA).

== Previous season ==
The Tribe finished the 2021–22 season 5–27, 4–14 in CAA play, to finish in ninth place. In the CAA tournament, they were defeated by Northeastern in the first round.

== Offseason ==
=== Departures ===
| Name | Number | Pos. | Height | Weight | Year | Hometown | Reason for departure |
|---|---|---|---|---|---|---|---|
| Quinn Blair | 21 | F | 6'7" | 225 | Redshirt senior | Livonia, MI | Graduated |
| Brandon Carroll | 4 | G/F | 6'7" | 210 | Graduate student | The Bronx, NY | Graduated |
| Yuri Covington | 5 | G | 6'1" | 192 | Sophomore | Wilkes-Barre, PA | Transferred to UMass Lowell |
| Mehkel Harvey | 30 | F/C | 6'9" | 225 | Senior | Huntington Beach, CA | Graduated |
| Langdon Hatton | 33 | F | 6'10" | 230 | Freshman | Georgetown, IN | Transferred to Bellarmine |
| Rainers Hermanovskis | 10 | G | 6'4" | 201 | Junior | Smiltene, Latvia | Left team |
| Connor Kochera | 23 | G | 6'5" | 200 | Sophomore | Arlington Heights, IL | Transferred to Davidson |
| Julian Lewis | 2 | G | 6'6" | 200 | Freshman | Ann Arbor, MI | Transferred to Miami University |
| Kurt Samuels Jr. | 0 | G | 6'5" | 230 | Sophomore | Alexandria, VA | Left team |
| Austin Washburn | 24 | G | 6'4" | 175 | Senior | Powhatan, VA | Graduated |

=== Incoming transfers ===
| Name | Number | Pos. | Height | Weight | Year | Hometown | Previous school |
|---|---|---|---|---|---|---|---|
| Matteus Case | 4 | G | 6'5" | 196 | Sophomore | Pickering, ON | Transferred from Providence |
| Noah Collier | 5 | F | 6'8" | 220 | Junior | Mullica Hill, NJ | Transferred from Pittsburgh |
| Gabe Dorsey | 21 | G/F | 6'6" | 215 | Sophomore | Westminster, MD | Transferred from Vanderbilt |
| Chris Mullins | 24 | G | 6'3" | 192 | Graduate student | Grand Prairie, TX | Transferred from Rice |
| Anders Nelson | 0 | G | 6'1" | 172 | Graduate student | Edina, MN | Transferred from St. Thomas |

=== 2022 recruiting class ===
College recruiting
| Name | Hometown | School | Height | Weight | Commit date |
|---|---|---|---|---|---|
| Nick Evans; F | Alexandria, VA | Gonzaga College High School | 6 ft 9 in (2.06 m) | 200 lb (91 kg) | Jun 12, 2022 |
| Nick Evans; F | Recruit ratings: Scout: Rivals: (NR) | | | | |
| Miles Hicks; G | Upper Marlboro, MD | St. Albans School | 6 ft 1 in (1.85 m) | 156 lb (71 kg) | Jun 12, 2022 |
| Miles Hicks; G | Recruit ratings: Scout: Rivals: (NR) | | | | |
| Jack Karasinski; G/F | Grand Rapids, MI | Catholic Central High School | 6 ft 7 in (2.01 m) | 206 lb (93 kg) | Jun 1, 2021 |
| Jack Karasinski; G/F | Recruit ratings: Scout: Rivals: (NR) | | | | |
| Chase Lowe; G | Matthews, NC | Weddington High School | 6 ft 5 in (1.96 m) | 201 lb (91 kg) | Apr 13, 2022 |
| Chase Lowe; G | Recruit ratings: Scout: Rivals: (NR) | | | | |
| Charlie Williams; F | Carmel, IN | Carmel High School | 6 ft 10 in (2.08 m) | 220 lb (100 kg) | Nov 10, 2021 |
| Charlie Williams; F | Recruit ratings: Scout: Rivals: (NR) | | | | |
Overall recruit ranking: 247Sports: 173
Note: In many cases, Scout, Rivals, 247Sports, On3, and ESPN may conflict in their listings of height and weight.; In these cases, the average was taken. ESPN grades are on a 100-point scale.; Sources: "2022 Team Ranking". Rivals.

== Roster ==
2022–23 William & Mary Tribe men's basketball team
Players
Coaches

| Pos. | # | Name | Height | Weight | Year | Previous school | Hometown |
|---|---|---|---|---|---|---|---|
| G | 0 | Anders Nelson | 6 ft 1 in (1.85 m) | 172 lb (78 kg) | GS | St. Thomas | Edina, MN |
| G | 1 | Jake Milkereit | 6 ft 5 in (1.96 m) | 200 lb (91 kg) | Jr | Bishop Lynch High School | Dallas, TX |
| G | 2 | Chase Lowe | 6 ft 5 in (1.96 m) | 201 lb (91 kg) | Fr | Weddington High School | Weddington, NC |
| G | 3 | Matteus Case | 6 ft 5 in (1.96 m) | 196 lb (89 kg) | So | Providence | Pickering, ON |
| F | 5 | Noah Collier | 6 ft 8 in (2.03 m) | 220 lb (100 kg) | Jr | Pittsburgh | Mullica Hill, NJ |
| G/F | 11 | Jack Karasinski | 6 ft 7 in (2.01 m) | 206 lb (93 kg) | Fr | Catholic Central High School | Grand Rapids, MI |
| G | 12 | Tyler Rice | 6 ft 1 in (1.85 m) | 183 lb (83 kg) | So | Ridge View High School | Columbia, SC |
| G | 15 | Miguel Ayesa | 6 ft 5 in (1.96 m) | 200 lb (91 kg) | Sr | National Top Sports Institute | Madrid, Spain |
| G/F | 21 | Gabe Dorsey | 6 ft 6 in (1.98 m) | 215 lb (98 kg) | So | Vanderbilt | Westminster, MD |
| F | 22 | Nick Evans | 6 ft 9 in (2.06 m) | 200 lb (91 kg) | Fr | Gonzaga College High School | Alexandria, VA |
| G | 24 | Chris Mullins | 6 ft 3 in (1.91 m) | 192 lb (87 kg) | GS | Rice | Grand Prairie, TX |
| G | 25 | Miles Hicks | 6 ft 1 in (1.85 m) | 156 lb (71 kg) | Fr | Saint Albans High School | Upper Marlboro, MD |
| F | 33 | Charlie Williams | 6 ft 10 in (2.08 m) | 220 lb (100 kg) | Fr | Carmel High School | Carmel, IN |
| F | 35 | Ben Wight | 6 ft 9 in (2.06 m) | 220 lb (100 kg) | Jr | Thomas Worthington High School | Columbus, OH |

Head coach

- Dane Fischer (Ithaca)

Assistant coach(es)

- Mike Howland (DePauw)
- Julian Boatner (William & Mary)
- Nate Bollinger (Millersville)

Legend

- (C) Team captain
- (S) Suspended
- (I) Ineligible
- (W) Walk-on
- Injured
- Current redshirt

Roster
Last update: December 22, 2022

== Schedule and results ==
| Date time, TV | Rank^{#} | Opponent^{#} | Result | Record | Site (attendance) city, state |
Non-conference regular season
| November 7, 2022*; 7:30 p.m., FloHoops/Cox YurView | | Navy | L 59–74 | 0–1 | Kaplan Arena (3,772); Williamsburg, VA |
| November 10, 2022*; 7:00 p.m., FloHoops | | Mid-Atlantic Christian | W 116–40 | 1–1 | Kaplan Arena (1,693); Williamsburg, VA |
| November 13, 2022*; 6:00 p.m., ACCRSN | | at Virginia Tech | L 77–94 | 1–2 | Cassell Coliseum (7,936); Blacksburg, VA |
| November 16, 2022*; 7:00 p.m., ESPN+ | | at American | L 64–71 | 1–3 | Bender Arena (1,204); Washington, D.C. |
| November 19, 2022*; 4:00 p.m., FloHoops/Cox YurView | | Army; William & Mary MTE | W 76–67 | 2–3 | Kaplan Arena (3,170); Williamsburg, VA |
| November 23, 2022*; 2:00 p.m., FloHoops/Cox YurView | | Radford; William & Mary MTE | W 62–51 | 3–3 | Kaplan Arena (1,776); Williamsburg, VA |
| November 25, 2022*; 7:00 p.m., ACCNX | | at Pittsburgh | L 64–80 | 3–4 | Petersen Events Center (5,649); Pittsburgh, PA |
| November 29, 2022*; 7:00 p.m., ACCNX | | at NC State | L 64–85 | 3–5 | PNC Arena (10,029); Raleigh, NC |
| December 3, 2022*; 7:00 p.m., FloHoops/Cox YurView | | Richmond | W 58–57 | 3–6 | Kaplan Arena (3,179); Williamsburg, VA |
| December 7, 2022*; 7:00 p.m., ESPN+ | | at Old Dominion; Rivalry | L 62–72 | 4–6 | Chartway Arena (4,579); Norfolk, VA |
| December 10, 2022*; 4:00 p.m., FloHoops/Cox YurView | | Norfolk State | L 53–67 | 4–7 | Kaplan Arena (2,541); Williamsburg, VA |
| December 18, 2022*; 1:00 p.m., ESPN+ | | at UMBC | L 62–78 | 4–8 | Chesapeake Employers Insurance Arena (1,036); Catonsville, MD |
| December 21, 2022*; 2:00 p.m., FloHoops | | Randolph | W 90–56 | 5–8 | Kaplan Arena (1,822); Williamsburg, VA |
CAA regular season
| December 31, 2022; 2:00 p.m., FloHoops | | at Drexel | L 56–66 | 5–9 (0–1) | Daskalakis Athletic Center (1,002); Philadelphia, PA |
| January 5, 2023; 7:00 p.m., FloHoops | | Northeastern | W 69–66 | 6–9 (1–1) | Kaplan Arena (1,777); Williamsburg, VA |
| January 7, 2023; 2:00 p.m., FloHoops | | Hofstra | L 62–75 | 6–10 (1–2) | Kaplan Arena (2,152); Williamsburg, VA |
| January 11, 2023; 7:00 p.m., FloHoops/Cox YurView | | Hampton | W 81–65 | 7–10 (2–2) | Kaplan Arena (2,015); Williamsburg, VA |
| January 14, 2023; 5:00 p.m., CBSSN | | at UNC Wilmington | W 69–67 | 8–10 (3–2) | Trask Coliseum (4,571); Wilmington, NC |
| January 16, 2023; 5:00 p.m., FloHoops | | at No. 18 College of Charleston | L 54–82 | 8–11 (3–3) | TD Arena (5,120); Charleston, SC |
| January 19, 2023; 7:00 p.m., FloHoops | | at Delaware | L 53–80 | 8–12 (3–4) | Bob Carpenter Center (2,192); Newark, DE |
| January 21, 2023; 2:00 p.m., FloHoops | | North Carolina A&T | L 86–90 | 8–13 (3–5) | Kaplan Arena (2,892); Williamsburg, VA |
| January 26, 2023; 7:00 p.m., FloHoops | | Stony Brook | W 77–74 | 9–13 (4–5) | Kaplan Arena (2,616); Williamsburg, VA |
| January 28, 2023; 4:00 p.m., FloHoops | | at Towson | L 73–92 | 9–14 (4–6) | SECU Arena (2,325); Towson, MD |
| February 2, 2023; 7:00 p.m., FloHoops | | at Hampton | L 57–62 | 9–15 (4–7) | Hampton Convocation Center (1,112); Hampton, VA |
| February 4, 2023; 2:00 p.m., FloHoops/Cox YurView | | UNC Wilmington | L 63–70 | 9–16 (4–8) | Kaplan Arena (5,053); Williamsburg, VA |
| February 11, 2023; 2:00 p.m., FloHoops | | at Elon | L 55–66 | 9–17 (4–9) | Schar Center (2,467); Elon, NC |
| February 13, 2023; 7:00 p.m., FloHoops/Cox YurView | | Towson | W 68–66 | 10–17 (5–9) | Kaplan Arena (2,005); Williamsburg, VA |
| February 16, 2023; 7:00 p.m., FloHoops | | at Stony Brook | L 66–71 | 10–18 (5–10) | Island Federal Arena (1,709); Stony Brook, NY |
| February 18, 2023; 12:00 p.m., FloHoops | | at Northeastern | L 57–69 | 10–19 (5–11) | Matthews Arena (1,011); Boston, MA |
| February 23, 2023; 7:00 p.m., FloHoops | | Elon | W 73–60 | 11–19 (6–11) | Kaplan Arena (2,178); Williamsburg, VA |
| February 25, 2023; 2:00 p.m., FloHoops | | Monmouth | W 74–62 | 12–19 (7–11) | Kaplan Arena (3,470); Williamsburg, VA |
CAA tournament
| March 4, 2023; 12:00 p.m., FloHoops | (8) | vs. (9) Elon; Second round | W 73–51 | 13–19 | Entertainment and Sports Arena; Washington, D.C. |
| March 5, 2023; 12:00 p.m., FloHoops | (8) | vs. (1) Hofstra; Quarterfinals | L 46–94 | 13–20 | Entertainment and Sports Arena; Washington, D.C. |
*Non-conference game. ^{#}Rankings from AP poll. (#) Tournament seedings in parentheses. All times are in Eastern.
