= 2023 CAA men's basketball tournament =

U.S. collegiate basketball event

- Classification: Division I
- Season: 2022–23
- Teams: 13
- Site: Entertainment and Sports Arena; Washington, D.C.
- Champions: Charleston (2nd title)
- Winning coach: Pat Kelsey (1st title)
- MVP: Ryan Larson (Charleston)
- Television: FloHoops, CBSSN

2022–23 CAA men's basketball standings
| | Conf. | | | | Overall |
| Team | W | | L | PCT | W | | L | PCT |
|---|---|---|---|---|---|---|---|---|
| Hofstra | 16 | – | 2 | .889 | 25 | – | 10 | .714 |
| Charleston † | 16 | – | 2 | .889 | 31 | – | 4 | .886 |
| Towson | 12 | – | 6 | .667 | 21 | – | 12 | .636 |
| UNC Wilmington | 12 | – | 6 | .667 | 24 | – | 10 | .706 |
| Drexel | 10 | – | 8 | .556 | 17 | – | 15 | .531 |
| Delaware | 8 | – | 10 | .444 | 17 | – | 16 | .515 |
| North Carolina A&T | 8 | – | 10 | .444 | 13 | – | 19 | .406 |
| William & Mary | 7 | – | 11 | .389 | 13 | – | 20 | .394 |
| Elon | 6 | – | 12 | .333 | 8 | – | 24 | .250 |
| Stony Brook | 6 | – | 12 | .333 | 11 | – | 22 | .333 |
| Northeastern | 6 | – | 12 | .333 | 10 | – | 20 | .333 |
| Hampton | 5 | – | 13 | .278 | 8 | – | 24 | .250 |
| Monmouth | 5 | – | 13 | .278 | 7 | – | 26 | .212 |
† 2023 CAA tournament winner

The 2023 Colonial Athletic Association men's basketball tournament was the postseason men's college basketball tournament for the Colonial Athletic Association for the 2022–23 NCAA Division I men's basketball season. The tournament was held March 3–7, 2023 at the Entertainment and Sports Arena in Washington, D.C. Charleston won the tournament, claiming the conference's automatic bid to the 2023 NCAA tournament.

This was the final men's basketball tournament held under the Colonial Athletic Association name. On July 20, 2023, the CAA announced it had changed its name to Coastal Athletic Association. The name change did not affect the CAA initialism, and the conference kept its existing logo.

== Seeds ==
| Seed | School | Conf. | Tiebreaker |
|---|---|---|---|
| 1 | Hofstra | 16–2 | 1–0 vs. Charleston |
| 2 | Charleston | 16–2 | 0–1 vs. Hofstra |
| 3 | Towson | 12–6 | 1–0 vs. UNC Wilmington |
| 4 | UNC Wilmington | 12–6 | 0–1 vs. Towson |
| 5 | Drexel | 10–8 | |
| 6 | Delaware | 8–10 | 1–0 vs. North Carolina A&T |
| 7 | North Carolina A&T | 8–10 | 0–1 vs. Delaware |
| 8 | William & Mary | 7–11 | |
| 9 | Elon | 6–12 | 2–0 vs. Northeastern/Stony Brook |
| 10 | Stony Brook | 6–12 | 1–1 vs. Northeastern; 1–0 vs. Drexel |
| 11 | Northeastern | 6–12 | 1–1 vs. Stony Brook; 0–2 vs. Drexel |
| 12 | Hampton | 5–13 | 2–0 vs. Monmouth |
| 13 | Monmouth | 5–13 | 0–2 vs. Hampton |

== Schedule ==
| Session | Game | Time* | Matchup | Score | Television |
First round – Friday, March 3
| 1 | 1 | 2:00 pm | No. 12 Hampton vs. No. 13 Monmouth | 64–100 | FloHoops |
Second round – Saturday, March 4
| 2 | 2 | 12:00 pm | No. 8 William & Mary vs. No. 9 Elon | 73–51 | FloHoops |
| 2 | 3 | 2:30 pm | No. 5 Drexel vs. No. 13 Monmouth | 64–45 | FloHoops |
| 3 | 4 | 6:00 pm | No. 7 North Carolina A&T vs. No. 10 Stony Brook | 61–76 | FloHoops |
| 3 | 5 | 8:30 pm | No. 6 Delaware vs. No. 11 Northeastern | 77–74^{OT} | FloHoops |
Quarterfinals – Sunday, March 5
| 4 | 6 | 12:00 pm | No. 1 Hofstra vs. No. 8 William & Mary | 94–46 | FloHoops |
| 4 | 7 | 2:30 pm | No. 4 UNC Wilmington vs. No. 5 Drexel | 73–68 | FloHoops |
| 5 | 8 | 6:00 pm | No. 2 Charleston vs. No. 10 Stony Brook | 74–52 | FloHoops |
| 5 | 9 | 8:30 pm | No. 3 Towson vs. No. 6 Delaware | 86–60 | FloHoops |
Semifinals – Monday, March 6
| 6 | 10 | 6:00 pm | No. 1 Hofstra vs. No. 4 UNC Wilmington | 73–79^{OT} | CBSSN |
| 6 | 11 | 8:30 pm | No. 2 Charleston vs. No. 3 Towson | 77–72 | CBSSN |
Championship – Tuesday, March 7
| 7 | 12 | 7:00 pm | No. 4 UNC Wilmington vs. No. 2 Charleston | 58–63 | CBSSN |
*Game times in ET. Rankings denote tournament seed

== Bracket ==
First round Friday, March 3 FloHoops
12 | Hampton | 64
13 | Monmouth | 100

Second round Saturday, March 4 FloHoops
8 | William & Mary | 73
9 | Elon | 51
5 | Drexel | 64
13 | Monmouth | 45
7 | North Carolina A&T | 61
10 | Stony Brook | 76
6 | Delaware | 77*
11 | Northeastern | 74

Quarterfinals; Sunday, March 5 FloHoops
1 | Hofstra | 94
8 | William & Mary | 46
4 | UNC Wilmington | 73
5 | Drexel | 68
2 | Charleston | 74
10 | Stony Brook | 52
3 | Towson | 86
6 | Delaware | 60

Semifinals; Monday, March 6 CBS Sports Network
1 | Hofstra | 73
4 | UNC Wilmington | 79*
2 | Charleston | 77
3 | Towson | 72

Championship; Tuesday, March 7 CBS Sports Network
4 | UNC Wilmington | 58
2 | Charleston | 63

* denotes overtime game

== Honors ==
| CAA All-Tournament Team | Player | School |
|---|---|---|
| CAA All-Tournament Team | Ante Brzovic | Charleston |
| CAA All-Tournament Team | Aaron Estrada | Hofstra |
| CAA All-Tournament Team | Ryan Larson (MVP) | Charleston |
| CAA All-Tournament Team | Donovan Newby | UNC Wilmington |
| CAA All-Tournament Team | Nicolas Timberlake | Towson |
| CAA All-Tournament Team | Trazarien White | UNC Wilmington |

== See also ==
- 2023 CAA women's basketball tournament
