= Aurimas Majauskas =

Lithuanian basketball player (born 1993)

- Majauskas with Lleida in 2026

Personal information
- Born: 11 May 1993 (age 33) Marijampolė, Lithuania
- Listed height: 203 cm (6 ft 8 in)
- Listed weight: 103 kg (227 lb)

Career information
- High school: Los Angeles Harbor College
- College: Sam Houston State (2013–2017)
- NBA draft: 2017: undrafted
- Playing career: 2011–present
- Position: Power forward / center

Career history
- 2011–2012: Sūduva-Mantinga
- 2017: Dynamic
- 2018: Vytis
- 2018–2019: BC Kuršiai
- 2019: Sūduva-Mantinga
- 2019–2020: Njarðvík
- 2020–2021: BC Zaporizhya
- 2021–2022: London Lions
- 2022: BK Ventspils
- 2022–2023: BC Budivelnyk
- 2023: CBet Jonava
- 2023–2024: Gargždai
- 2024–2025: CBet Jonava
- 2025–2026: Neptūnas Klaipėda
- 2026: Força Lleida

Aurimas Majauskas (born 11 May 1993) is a Lithuanian professional basketball player. He played college basketball for Sam Houston State from 2013 to 2017.

== Professional career ==
After graduating from Sam Houston State Bearkats in 2017, on 29 August 2017 he signed with Serbian basketball team KK Dynamic. On 30 December 2017 he parted ways with Dynamic. Over nine 2017–18 season games of the Second Adriatic League, he averaged 5.4 points, 3.4 rebounds and 0.9 assists per game.

In December 2019, Majauskas signed with Njarðvík of the Icelandic Úrvalsdeild karla. He averaged 15.1 points and 7.0 rebounds in 10 games for Njarðvík before the rest of the season was canceled due to the coronavirus pandemic in Iceland.

In August 2020, Majauskas signed with Ukrainian professional basketball club, BC Zaporizhzhia. In the 2020–21 season of the Ukrainian Basketball SuperLeague, he averages 13.3 points, 5.6 rebounds and 1.6 assists per game.

In August 2021, he signed with UK basketball club London Lions to play in the FIBA Europe Cup competition, averaging 9.8 points, 3.1 rebounds and 1.3 assists. After this, he signed in March 2022 with Latvian basketball team BK Ventspils of the Latvian–Estonian Basketball League. There he averaged 10.4 points and 5.6 rebounds.

On 7 August 2022, he signed with BC Budivelnyk of the European North Basketball League.

On 16 April 2023, Majauskas signed with CBet Jonava of the Lithuanian Basketball League (LKL).

On 16 November 2025, Majauskas signed with Neptūnas Klaipėda of the Lithuanian Basketball League (LKL) and the EuroCup.

== Career statistics ==
Legend
| GP | Games played | GS | Games started | MPG | Minutes per game |
| FG% | Field-goal percentage | 3P% | 3-point field-goal percentage | FT% | Free-throw percentage |
| RPG | Rebounds per game | APG | Assists per game | SPG | Steals per game |
| BPG | Blocks per game | PPG | Points per game | PIR | Performance index rating |
| **Bold** | Career high |

=== EuroCup ===
| Year | Team | GP | GS | MPG | FG% | 3P% | FT% | RPG | APG | SPG | BPG | PPG | PIR |
|---|---|---|---|---|---|---|---|---|---|---|---|---|---|
| 2025–26 | Neptūnas Klaipėda | 11 | 7 | 18.9 | .593 | .471 | .773 | 3.2 | .6 | .5 | .0 | 8.6 | 8.1 |
| Career | | 11 | 7 | 18.9 | .593 | .471 | .773 | 3.2 | .6 | .5 | .0 | 8.6 | 8.1 |
