= 2022–23 North Carolina A&T Aggies men's basketball team =

American college basketball season

2022–23 North Carolina A&T Aggies men's basketball
- Conference: Colonial Athletic Association
- Record: 13–19 (8–10 CAA)
- Head coach: Phillip Shumpert (interim)
- Assistant coaches: Sam Hunt; Bruce Martin
- Home arena: Corbett Sports Center

2022–23 CAA men's basketball standings
	Conf.				Overall
Team	W		L	PCT	W		L	PCT
Hofstra	16	–	2	.889	25	–	10	.714
Charleston †	16	–	2	.889	31	–	4	.886
Towson	12	–	6	.667	21	–	12	.636
UNC Wilmington	12	–	6	.667	24	–	10	.706
Drexel	10	–	8	.556	17	–	15	.531
Delaware	8	–	10	.444	17	–	16	.515
North Carolina A&T	8	–	10	.444	13	–	19	.406
William & Mary	7	–	11	.389	13	–	20	.394
Elon	6	–	12	.333	8	–	24	.250
Stony Brook	6	–	12	.333	11	–	22	.333
Northeastern	6	–	12	.333	10	–	20	.333
Hampton	5	–	13	.278	8	–	24	.250
Monmouth	5	–	13	.278	7	–	26	.212
† 2023 CAA tournament winner

The 2022–23 North Carolina A&T Aggies men's basketball team represented North Carolina A&T State University in the 2022–23 NCAA Division I men's basketball season. The Aggies, led by interim head coach Phillip Shumpert, played their home games at the Corbett Sports Center in Greensboro, North Carolina as first-year members of the Colonial Athletic Association (CAA). They finished the season 13–18, 8–10 in CAA play, to finish in a tie for sixth place. They were defeated by Stony Brook in the second round of the CAA tournament.

== Previous season ==
The Aggies finished the 2021–22 season 12–20, 6–10 in Big South Conference play, to finish in fifth place in the North Division. In the Big South tournament, they defeated Radford in the first round before falling to top-seeded Longwood in the quarterfinals. This would be the team's only season as a member of the Big South Conference, as they moved to the Colonial Athletic Association, effective July 1, 2022. On August 18, the school announced the firing of head coach Willie Jones, after only two years at the helm. Assistant coach Phillip Shumpert was the interim head coach for the 2022–23 season, as the school looked for a new head coach following the end of the season.

== Roster ==
2022–23 North Carolina A&T Aggies men's basketball team
Players
Coaches

Pos.	#	Name	Height	Weight	Year	Hometown
G	0	Kyle Duke	6 ft 4 in (1.93 m)	185 lb (84 kg)	So	Toronto, ON
F	1	Jeremy Robinson	6 ft 6 in (1.98 m)	215 lb (98 kg)	Sr	Raleigh, NC
G	2	Love Bettis	6 ft 0 in (1.83 m)	170 lb (77 kg)	So	Pensacola, FL
G	3	Kam Woods	6 ft 2 in (1.88 m)	185 lb (84 kg)	So	Bessemer, AL
F	4	Marcus Watson	6 ft 6 in (1.98 m)	235 lb (107 kg)	RS Jr	Buford, GA
G	5	Tyrese Elliott	6 ft 2 in (1.88 m)	190 lb (86 kg)	Fr	Grayson, GA
G	10	Justin Brooks	6 ft 1 in (1.85 m)	185 lb (84 kg)	Jr	Auburn, AL
G	11	Garrison Powell	6 ft 4 in (1.93 m)	185 lb (84 kg)	Fr	Atlanta, GA
F	13	Austin Johnson	6 ft 9 in (2.06 m)	235 lb (107 kg)	Sr	Austell, GA
C	14	Harry Morrice	6 ft 11 in (2.11 m)	235 lb (107 kg)	Sr	Warrington, England
G	15	Trey Crews	6 ft 1 in (1.85 m)	170 lb (77 kg)	RS Fr	Durham, NC
G	20	Chase McDuffie	6 ft 5 in (1.96 m)	210 lb (95 kg)	RS Fr	Columbia, SC
G	23	Ahmad Hamilton	6 ft 2 in (1.88 m)	170 lb (77 kg)	RS So	Durham, NC
G	24	Demetric Horton	6 ft 5 in (1.96 m)	200 lb (91 kg)	Sr	Raleigh, NC
F	25	Webster Filmore	6 ft 7 in (2.01 m)	225 lb (102 kg)	GS	Charlotte, NC
F	31	Duncan Powell	6 ft 8 in (2.03 m)	225 lb (102 kg)	RS Fr	Dallas, TX
C	34	Will Felton	6 ft 9 in (2.06 m)	260 lb (118 kg)	RS Fr	Raleigh, NC

Head coach

- Phillip Shumpert (interim, US Sports Academy)

Assistant coach(es)

- Sam Hunt (NC State)
- Bruce Martin (Clemson)

Legend

- (C) Team captain
- (S) Suspended
- (I) Ineligible
- (W) Walk-on
- Injured
- Current redshirt

Roster
Last update: January 15, 2023

== Schedule and results ==
Date time, TV	Rank^{#}	Opponent^{#}	Result	Record	Site (attendance) city, state
Non-conference regular season
November 7, 2022*; 7:00 p.m., FloHoops		Edward Waters	W 100–61	1–0	Corbett Sports Center (3,857); Greensboro, NC
November 11, 2022*; 8:00 p.m., BTN+		at Iowa	L 71–112	1–1	Carver–Hawkeye Arena (11,296); Iowa City, IA
November 13, 2022*; 1:00 p.m., Big 12 Now		at Iowa State	L 43–80	1–2	Hilton Coliseum (12,731); Ames, IA
November 19, 2022*; 5:00 p.m.		at Gardner–Webb; Battle of the Carolinas	L 64–66	1–3	Jerry Richardson Indoor Stadium (268); Spartanburg, SC
November 20, 2022*; 5:00 p.m., ESPN+		at Wofford; Battle of the Carolinas	L 64–78	1–4	Jerry Richardson Indoor Stadium (506); Spartanburg, SC
November 22, 2022*; 6:00 p.m., FloHoops		St. Andrews	W 109–57	2–4	Corbett Sports Center (706); Greensboro, NC
November 26, 2022*; 2:00 p.m., FloHoops		Greensboro	W 78–51	3–4	Corbett Sports Center (851); Greensboro, NC
November 30, 2022*; 7:00 p.m., FloHoops		UNC Greensboro; Battle of Market Street	W 73–56	4–4	Corbett Sports Center (4,704); Greensboro, NC
December 13, 2022*; 8:00 p.m., ESPN+		at No. 5 Houston	L 46–74	4–5	Fertitta Center (7,268); Houston, TX
December 17, 2022*; 6:30 p.m., ESPN+		vs. Texas Southern; Boost Mobile HBCU Challenge	W 67–66 ^{OT}	5–5	MGM Grand Garden Arena; Las Vegas, NV
December 18, 2022*; 2:00 p.m., ESPNU		vs. Norfolk State; Boost Mobile HBCU Challenge	L 66–70	5–6	MGM Grand Garden Arena; Las Vegas, NV
December 21, 2022*; 9:30 p.m.		at UTEP; Sun Bowl Invitational	L 62–75	5–7	Don Haskins Center (4,255); El Paso, TX
December 22, 2022*; 7:30 p.m.		vs. New Mexico State; Sun Bowl Invitational	L 76–85	5–8	Don Haskins Center; El Paso, TX
CAA regular season
December 29, 2022; 7:00 p.m., FloHoops		at Northeastern	L 76–88	5–9 (0–1)	Matthews Arena (817); Boston, MA
December 31, 2022; 1:00 p.m., FloHoops		at Hofstra	W 81–79	6–9 (1–1)	Mack Sports Complex (1,667); Hempstead, NY
January 4, 2023; 5:00 p.m., CBSSN		No. 23 College of Charleston	L 79–92	6–10 (1–2)	Corbett Sports Center (2,655); Greensboro, NC
January 7, 2023; 2:00 p.m., FloHoops		UNC Wilmington	L 61–66	6–11 (1–3)	Corbett Sports Center (1,904); Greensboro, NC
January 11, 2023; 7:00 p.m., FloHoops		at Elon	W 80–71	7–11 (2–3)	Schar Center (1,804); Elon, NC
January 14, 2023; 2:00 p.m., FloHoops		Stony Brook	W 61–59	8–11 (3–3)	Corbett Sports Center (1,346); Greensboro, NC
January 16, 2023; 7:00 p.m., FloHoops		at Hampton	W 79–67	9–11 (4–3)	Hampton Convocation Center (3,825); Hampton, VA
January 19, 2023; 7:00 p.m., FloHoops		Towson	L 67–79	9–12 (4–4)	Corbett Sports Center (5,700); Greensboro, NC
January 21, 2023; 2:00 p.m., FloHoops		at William & Mary	W 90–86	10–12 (5–4)	Kaplan Arena (2,892); Williamsburg, VA
January 26, 2023; 7:00 p.m., FloHoops		Drexel	W 68–55	11–12 (6–4)	Corbett Sports Center (2,456); Greensboro, NC
January 28, 2023; 2:00 p.m., FloHoops		Monmouth	L 64–79	11–13 (6–5)	Corbett Sports Center (1,555); Greensboro, NC
February 2, 2023; 7:00 p.m., FloHoops		at UNC Wilmington	L 63–87	11–14 (6–6)	Trask Coliseum (3,848); Wilmington, NC
February 8, 2023; 7:00 p.m., FloHoops		Elon	W 66–61	12–14 (7–6)	Corbett Sports Center (2,903); Greensboro, NC
February 11, 2023; 2:00 p.m., FloHoops		at Stony Brook	L 59–69	12–15 (7–7)	Island Federal Arena (2,125); Stony Brook, NY
February 13, 2023; 7:00 p.m., FloHoops		at Monmouth	L 71–85	12–16 (7–8)	OceanFirst Bank Center (1,394); West Long Branch, NJ
February 18, 2023; 4:00 p.m., FloHoops		at Towson	L 75–87	12–17 (7–9)	SECU Arena (3,598); Towson, MD
February 23, 2023; 7:00 p.m., FloHoops		Delaware	L 71–73	12–18 (7–10)	Corbett Sports Center (1,658); Greensboro, NC
February 25, 2023; 2:00 p.m., FloHoops		Hampton	W 73–72 ^{OT}	13–18 (8–10)	Corbett Sports Center (3,002); Greensboro, NC
CAA tournament
March 4, 2023; 6:00 p.m., FloHoops	(7)	vs. (10) Stony Brook; Second round	L 61–76	13–19	Entertainment and Sports Arena; Washington, D.C.
*Non-conference game. ^{#}Rankings from AP poll. (#) Tournament seedings in parentheses. All times are in Eastern.
