= 2022–23 Charleston Cougars men's basketball team =

American college basketball season

2022–23 Charleston Cougars men's basketball

CAA co-regular season and tournament champions Charleston Classic champions

NCAA tournament, First Round
- Conference: Colonial Athletic Association
- Record: 31–4 (16–2 CAA)
- Head coach: Pat Kelsey (2nd season)
- Associate head coach: Brian Kloman
- Assistant coaches: Michael Cassidy; Thomas Carr
- Home arena: TD Arena

2022–23 CAA men's basketball standings
	Conf.				Overall
Team	W		L	PCT	W		L	PCT
Hofstra	16	–	2	.889	25	–	10	.714
Charleston †	16	–	2	.889	31	–	4	.886
Towson	12	–	6	.667	21	–	12	.636
UNC Wilmington	12	–	6	.667	24	–	10	.706
Drexel	10	–	8	.556	17	–	15	.531
Delaware	8	–	10	.444	17	–	16	.515
North Carolina A&T	8	–	10	.444	13	–	19	.406
William & Mary	7	–	11	.389	13	–	20	.394
Elon	6	–	12	.333	8	–	24	.250
Stony Brook	6	–	12	.333	11	–	22	.333
Northeastern	6	–	12	.333	10	–	20	.333
Hampton	5	–	13	.278	8	–	24	.250
Monmouth	5	–	13	.278	7	–	26	.212
† 2023 CAA tournament winner

The 2022–23 College of Charleston Cougars men's basketball team represented the College of Charleston in the 2022–23 NCAA Division I men's basketball season. The Cougars, led by second-year head coach Pat Kelsey, played their home games at the TD Arena in Charleston, South Carolina as members of the Colonial Athletic Association.

On January 2, 2023, the Cougars were ranked in the AP poll for the first time in 20 years. They remained ranked for four weeks, the earliest in any season that the Cougars have been ranked for multiple consecutive weeks.

The team defeated Stony Brook, Towson, and UNC Wilmington to win the CAA tournament, claiming the conference's automatic bid to the NCAA tournament. The team won 31 games before qualifying for the NCAA tournament, a record for the school's Division I era.

This was the 6th NCAA tournament appearance in program history. As a No. 12 seed in the NCAA tournament's Southern region, they were defeated in the first round by No. 5 seed San Diego State, a team that went on to upset No. 1 seed Alabama in the Sweet 16 and later played in the national championship game.

== Previous season ==
The Cougars finished the 2021–22 season 17–15, 8–10 in CAA play, to finish in sixth place. They defeated Hofstra in the quarterfinals of the CAA tournament before losing to UNC Wilmington in the semifinals.

== Offseason ==
=== Departures ===
Charleston departures
Name	Number	Pos.	Height	Weight	Year	Hometown	Reason for departure
Jordan Sechan	1	G	6'1"		GS	New Canaan, Connecticut	Graduated
Brendan Tucker	5	G	6'3"	180	JR	Lawrenceville, Georgia	Transferred to Georgia State
Dimitrius Underwood	11	G/F	6'4"	215	GS	Mesquite, Texas	Graduated
John Meeks	12	F	6'6"	224	GS	Burlington, North Carolina	Graduated
Nick Farrar	30	F	6'6"	250	SO	Apex, North Carolina	Transferred to UNC Wilmington
Osinachi Smart	33	F/C	6'8"	240	GS	Umuahia, Nigeria	Graduated

=== Incoming transfers ===
Charleston incoming transfers
Name	Number	Pos	Height	Weight	Year	Hometown	Previous school	Years remaining	Date eligible
Ante Brzovic	10	F	6'10"	230	SO	Zagreb, Croatia	Southeastern Oklahoma State	3	October 1, 2022
Ryan Larson	11	G	6'1"	180	GS	Saint Paul, Minnesota	Wofford	1	October 1, 2022
Pat Robinson III	15	G	6'3"	195	GS	Chesterfield, New Jersey	West Liberty	1	October 1, 2022
Jaylon Scott	21	G	6'5"	195	GS	Allen, Texas	Bethel	1	October 1, 2022

=== 2022 recruiting class ===
College recruiting information
Name	Hometown	School	Height	Weight	Commit date
Jordan Crawford; SG	Huntersville, NC	North Mecklenbeurg	6 ft 2 in (1.88 m)	180 lb (82 kg)	Jul 1, 2022
Jordan Crawford; SG	Recruit ratings: Scout: Rivals: 247Sports: (NR)				
Khalil London; CG	Oyster Bay, NY	Scotland Campus	6 ft 3 in (1.91 m)	180 lb (82 kg)	Aug 12, 2022
Khalil London; CG	Recruit ratings: Scout: Rivals: 247Sports: (NR)				
Overall recruit ranking:
Note: In many cases, Scout, Rivals, 247Sports, On3, and ESPN may conflict in their listings of height and weight.; In these cases, the average was taken. ESPN grades are on a 100-point scale.; Sources: "2022 Team Ranking". Rivals.

== Preseason ==
In the conference's preseason poll, the Cougars were picked to finish in fourth place.

2022 All-CAA Rookie Team members Reyne Smith and Ben Burnham continued for a second year on the team, and Dalton Bolon returned after an injury early last season.

== Roster ==
2022–23 College of Charleston Cougars men's basketball team
Players
Coaches

Pos.	#	Name	Height	Weight	Year	Previous school	Hometown
G	0	Jordan Crawford	6 ft 2 in (1.88 m)	—	Fr	North Mecklenburg HS	Charlotte, NC
G	1	Evan Kilminster	6 ft 1 in (1.85 m)	—	Fr	Australian Institute of Sport	Newcastle, Australia
G	2	Reyne Smith	6 ft 2 in (1.88 m)	180 lb (82 kg)	So	Australian Institute of Sport	Ulverstone, Australia
G	3	Dalton Bolon	6 ft 4 in (1.93 m)	205 lb (93 kg)	GS	West Liberty	Gnadenhutten, OH
G	4	Khalil London	6 ft 3 in (1.91 m)	180 lb (82 kg)	Fr	St. Dominic HS	Wyandanch, NY
F	5	Raekwon Horton	6 ft 6 in (1.98 m)	200 lb (91 kg)	So	Vermont Academy	Santee, SC
F	10	Ante Brzovic	6 ft 10 in (2.08 m)	230 lb (104 kg)	So	Southeastern Oklahoma State	Zagreb, Croatia
G	11	Ryan Larson	6 ft 1 in (1.85 m)	180 lb (82 kg)	GS	Wofford	Saint Paul, MN
G	15	Pat Robinson III	6 ft 3 in (1.91 m)	195 lb (88 kg)	GS	West Liberty	Chesterfield, NJ
G	21	Jaylon Scott	6 ft 5 in (1.96 m)	195 lb (88 kg)	GS	Bethel	Allen, TX
F	25	Ben Burnham	6 ft 7 in (2.01 m)	200 lb (91 kg)	So	Carmel Christian School	Fort Mill, SC
G	31	Jack Miller	5 ft 11 in (1.8 m)	—	So	Ocean Township HS	Ocean Township, NJ
F	35	Babacar Faye	6 ft 8 in (2.03 m)	—	So	NBA Academy Africa	Saly, Senegal
G	40	Frankie Idlett	6 ft 0 in (1.83 m)	166 lb (75 kg)	Fr	IMG Academy	Miami, FL
F	41	Spencer Legg	6 ft 6 in (1.98 m)	200 lb (91 kg)	Fr	Woodberry Forest School	Washington, D.C.
F	42	Charles Lampten	6 ft 11 in (2.11 m)	230 lb (104 kg)	Sr	Dawson CC	Roanoke, TX
G	45	Dylan Ritter	6 ft 1 in (1.85 m)	—	So	Zionsville HS	Zionsville, IN
F	50	Adam Comer	6 ft 9 in (2.06 m)	—	So	Broome HS	Spartanburg, SC

Head coach

- Pat Kelsey (Xavier)

Assistant coach(es)

- Brian Kloman (Tennessee)
- Michael Cassidy (ACPE)
- Thomas Carr (Pfeiffer)

Legend

- (C) Team captain
- (S) Suspended
- (I) Ineligible
- (W) Walk-on
- Injured
- Current redshirt

Roster
Last update: November 22, 2022

== Schedule and results ==
Date time, TV	Rank^{#}	Opponent^{#}	Result	Record	High points	High rebounds	High assists	Site (attendance) city, state
Non-conference regular season
November 7, 2022*; 7:30 pm, FloHoops		Chattanooga	W 85–78	1–0	24 – Smith	8 – Lampten	4 – Larson	TD Arena (4,006); Charleston, SC
November 11, 2022*; 7:00 pm, Bally Sports		at No. 1 North Carolina	L 86–102	1–1	16 – Bolon	8 – Faye	7 – Scott	Dean Smith Center (17,892); Chapel Hill, NC
November 14, 2022*; 7:00 pm, FloHoops		Richmond	W 92–90 ^{OT}	2–1	29 – Smith	10 – Faye	7 – Scott	TD Arena (4,515); Charleston, SC
November 17, 2022*; 7:00 pm, ESPNU		Davidson; Charleston Classic First Round	W 89–66	3–1	21 – Bolon	7 – Bolon	5 – Larson	TD Arena (5,017); Charleston, SC
November 18, 2022*; 5:00 pm, ESPN2		Colorado State; Charleston Classic Semifinals	W 74–64	4–1	12 – Scott	8 – Faye	2 – Scott	TD Arena; Charleston, SC
November 20, 2022*; 3:30 pm, ESPN2		Virginia Tech; Charleston Classic Championship	W 77–75	5–1	15 – Brzovic	8 – Faye	3 – Larson	TD Arena (5,405); Charleston, SC
November 23, 2022*; 6:00 pm, FloHoops		Kent State	W 74–72	6–1	16 – Larson	8 – Faye	5 – Larson	TD Arena (3,954); Charleston, SC
November 29, 2022*; 7:00 pm, FloHoops		Old Dominion	W 75–60	7–1	17 – Larson	4 – Smith	7 – Larson	TD Arena (3,935); Charleston, SC
December 3, 2022*; 1:00 pm, ESPN+		at The Citadel	W 79–57	8–1	16 – Brzovic	11 – Brzovic	3 – Horton	McAlister Field House (4,630); Charleston, SC
December 6, 2022*; 7:00 pm, ESPN+		at Presbyterian	W 67–62	9–1	15 – Horton	7 – Scott	2 – Horton	Templeton Physical Education Center (573); Clinton, SC
December 11, 2022*; 2:00 pm, FloHoops		North Greenville	W 96–67	10–1	22 – Bolon	8 – Burnham	8 – Larson	TD Arena (4,019); Charleston, SC
December 14, 2022*; 7:00 pm, FloHoops		Stetson	W 65–60	11–1	16 – Bolon	9 – Brzovic	5 – Scott	TD Arena (3,632); Charleston, SC
December 19, 2022*; 7:30 pm, ESPN+		at Coastal Carolina	W 83–69	12–1	23 – Smith	9 – Scott	7 – Larson	HTC Center (3,212); Conway, SC
CAA regular season
December 29, 2022; 7:00 pm, FloHoops		Hampton	W 89–61	13–1 (1–0)	19 – Robinson III	7 – Scott	5 – Scott	TD Arena (5,100); Charleston, SC
December 31, 2022; 12:00 pm, NBCSWA		at Towson	W 76–74 ^{OT}	14–1 (2–0)	22 – Brzovic	12 – Brzovic	5 – Larson	SECU Arena (2,472); Towson, MD
January 4, 2023; 5:00 pm, CBSSN	No. 23	at North Carolina A&T	W 92–79	15–1 (3–0)	22 – Bolon	10 – Bolon	4 – Larson	Corbett Sports Center (2,655); Greensboro, NC
January 7, 2023; 5:00 pm, CBSSN	No. 23	Delaware	W 75–64	16–1 (4–0)	13 – Bolon	12 – Brzovic	6 – Larson	TD Arena (5,162); Charleston, SC
January 11, 2023; 7:00 pm, FloHoops	No. 22	at UNC Wilmington	W 71–69	17–1 (5–0)	16 – Bolon	7 – Brzovic	7 – Larson	Trask Coliseum (5,221); Wilmington, NC
January 14, 2023; 4:00 pm, FloHoops	No. 22	Elon; Hall of Fame	W 78–60	18–1 (6–0)	21 – Bolon	11 – Scott	7 – Scott	TD Arena (5,095); Charleston, SC
January 16, 2023; 5:00 pm, FloHoops	No. 18	William & Mary	W 82–54	19–1 (7–0)	17 – Brzovic	8 – Burnham	5 – Larson	TD Arena (5,120); Charleston, SC
January 19, 2023; 7:00 pm, FloHoops	No. 18	at Monmouth	W 69–55	20–1 (8–0)	27 – Smith	6 – Brzovic	5 – Larson	OceanFirst Bank Center (1,478); West Long Branch, NJ
January 21, 2023; 12:00 pm, FloHoops	No. 18	at Northeastern	W 87–61	21–1 (9–0)	15 – Burnham	8 – Faye	4 – Larson	Matthews Arena (1,437); Boston, MA
January 28, 2023; 4:00 pm, FloHoops	No. 18	Hofstra	L 81–85	21–2 (9–1)	18 – Brzovic	9 – Bolon	6 – Larson	TD Arena (5,109); Charleston, SC
February 2, 2023; 7:00 pm, FloHoops		at Drexel	L 69–70	21–3 (9–2)	19 – Bolon	8 – Scott	3 – Smith	Daskalakis Athletic Center (2,009); Philadelphia, PA
February 4, 2023; 2:00 pm, FloHoops		at Delaware	W 84–67	22–3 (10–2)	18 – Bolon	9 – Brzovic	5 – Larson	Bob Carpenter Center (2,875); Newark, DE
February 8, 2023; 7:00 pm, FloHoops		UNC Wilmington; White Out	W 93–61	23–3 (11–2)	23 – Brzovic	7 – Brzovic	3 – Larson	TD Arena (5,101); Charleston, SC
February 11, 2023; 4:00 pm, FloHoops		at Hampton	W 83–70	24–3 (12–2)	30 – Robinson III	7 – Brzovic	6 – Larson	Hampton Convocation Center; Hampton, VA
February 13, 2023; 7:00 pm, FloHoops		Northeastern	W 99–63	25–3 (13–2)	23 – Brzovic	6 – Scott	4 – Larson	TD Arena (4,564); Charleston, SC
February 16, 2023; 7:00 pm, FloHoops		at Elon	W 88–66	26–3 (14–2)	15 – Smith	11 – Brzovic	7 – Scott	Schar Center (1,829); Elon, NC
February 23, 2023; 7:00 pm, CBSSN		Towson; Black Out	W 83–75	27–3 (15–2)	13 – Smith	8 – Scott	4 – Larson	TD Arena (5,102); Charleston, SC
February 25, 2023; 12:00 pm, CBSSN		Stony Brook; Senior Day	W 92–52	28–3 (16–2)	25 – Burnham	7 – Burnham	5 – Larson	TD Arena (5,116); Charleston, SC
CAA tournament
March 5, 2023; 6:00 pm, FloHoops	(2)	vs. (10) Stony Brook; Quarterfinals	W 74–52	29–3	15 – Brzovic	8 – Bolon	5 – Larson	Entertainment and Sports Arena; Washington, D.C.
March 6, 2023; 8:30 pm, CBSSN	(2)	vs. (3) Towson; Semifinals	W 77–72	30–3	20 – Smith	9 – Brzovic	2 – Smith	Entertainment and Sports Arena (2,002); Washington, D.C.
March 7, 2023; 7:00 pm, CBSSN	(2)	vs. (4) UNC Wilmington; Championship	W 63–58	31–3	23 – Larson	8 – Brzovic	3 – Brzovic	Entertainment and Sports Arena (2,072); Washington, D.C.
NCAA tournament
March 16, 2023*; 3:10 pm, TruTV	(12 S)	vs. (5 S) No. 18 San Diego State; First Round	L 57–63	31–4	12 – Brzovic	8 – Brzovic	4 – Scott	Amway Center (15,650); Orlando, FL
*Non-conference game. ^{#}Rankings from AP poll. (#) Tournament seedings in parentheses. S=South. All times are in Eastern.

== Awards and honors ==
Invitational tournament honors
Honors	Player	Position	Ref.
Charleston Classic Most Outstanding Player	Ryan Larson	Guard	

Conference honors
Honors	Player	Position
CAA Tournament Most Outstanding Player	Ryan Larson	G
CAA All-Tournament Team	Ryan Larson	G
CAA All-Tournament Team	Ante Brzovic	F
CAA Sixth Man of the Year	Pat Robinson III	G
All-CAA First Team	Dalton Bolon	G
All-CAA Third Team	Ryan Larson	G
All-CAA Third Team	Ante Brzovic	F
CAA All-Defensive Team	Jaylon Scott	G

National honors
Honors	Player	Position	Ref.
Academic All-America First Team	Dalton Bolon	Guard	

== Rankings ==
Ranking movements Legend: ██ Increase in ranking ██ Decrease in ranking — = Not ranked RV = Received votes
	Week																			
Poll	Pre	1	2	3	4	5	6	7	8	9	10	11	12	13	14	15	16	17	18	Final
AP	—	—	RV	RV	RV	RV	RV	RV	23	22	18	18	RV	RV	RV	RV	RV	RV	RV	Not released
Coaches	—	—	RV	RV	RV	RV	RV	RV	RV	24	21	18	RV	RV	RV	RV				

*AP does not release post-NCAA tournament rankings.
