= Jaylon Scott =

American basketball player (born 2000)

Personal information
- Born: July 28, 2000 (age 26) Allen, Texas
- Listed height: 6 ft 5 in (1.96 m)
- Listed weight: 223 lb (101 kg)

Career information
- High school: Allen High School (Allen, Texas)
- College: Bethel College (2018–2022); Charleston (2022–2023)
- NBA draft: 2023: undrafted
- Playing career: 2023–2024
- Position: Shooting guard / small forward

Career history
- 2023–2024: BC Gargždai-SC
- 2024: CSM Constanța

Career highlights
- CAA All-Defensive Team (2023); 2× All-NAIA First Team (2021, 2022); KCAC Player of the Year (2021, 2022); All-KCAC First Team (2022); 3× KCAC Defensive Player of the Year (2020–2022); 4× All-KCAC Defensive Team (2019–2022); KCAC Freshman of the Year (2019)

Jaylon Scott (born July 28, 2000) is an American former professional basketball player who last played for CSM Constanța of the Romanian Basketball League (LNBM).

== College career ==
=== Bethel College (2018–2022) ===
In his freshman year, Scott averaged 12.9 points, 10.3 rebounds per game and 2.0 steals per game. In his first collegiate game, he recorded 13 points, 7 rebounds and 3 blocks in a 69-83 losing effort over the William Woods Owls. The following game, he recorded his first double-double as he notched 21 points and 13 rebounds in a 77-69 win over the Doane College Tigers. Due to his strong outing in his first collegiate season, he was awarded the KCAC Freshman of the Year in 2019.

He recorded his first triple-double of his collegiate career after notching 10 points, 14 rebounds and 13 assists in a 92-112 loss to the William Penn University Statesmen.

During his senior year, he recorded a monstrous double-double involving 22 rebounds and a collegiate career-high 14 assists in a 73-75 losing effort to the Oklahoma Wesleyan University Eagles. He was also honored as one of the players mentioned in the NAIA All-American Team list.

=== College of Charleston (2022–2023) ===
On April 27, 2022, Scott was signed to become a member of the Charleston Cougars under head coach Pat Kelsey. With Scott, the 2022–23 Cougars won 31 games before qualifying for the 2023 NCAA tournament, a record for the school's Division I era. He averaged 4.3 points, 5.3 rebounds, 2.7 assists, and 1.1 steals while starting all 35 games for the Cougars, culminating in a spot on the CAA All-Defensive Team.

== Professional career ==
=== BC Gargždai (2023–2024) ===
After going undrafted in the 2023 NBA draft, Scott signed with BC Gargždai-SC of the Lithuanian Basketball League (LKL) in July 2023. He averaged 10.4 points, 6.3 rebounds, 5.5 assists, and 1.8 steals over 17 games in which Gargždai went 3–14. Scott's season ended suddenly in January 2024 after the team declared bankruptcy mid-season and was kicked out of the league.

=== CSM Constanța (2024–present) ===
Scott signed with CSM Constanța of the Romanian Basketball League (LNBM) in February 2024.

== Personal life ==
Jaylon Scott was raised in Plano, Texas where he attended Weatherford elementary school and Wilson middle school. Scott has two siblings, an older brother named Kenton Scott and a younger sister named Maya. At age 13 he moved with his family to Allen, Texas. Scott attended Allen High School in Allen, Texas and was a major in Business Administration. He attended College of Charleston MBA emphasizing in marketing. In spring of 2023 he made his first international trip to Istanbul Turkey.

== Career statistics ==
Legend
GP	Games played	GS	Games started	MPG	Minutes per game
FG%	Field goal percentage	3P%	3-point field goal percentage	FT%	Free throw percentage
RPG	Rebounds per game	APG	Assists per game	SPG	Steals per game
BPG	Blocks per game	PPG	Points per game	**Bold**	Career high

=== College ===
Year	Team	GP	GS	MPG	FG%	3P%	FT%	RPG	APG	SPG	BPG	PPG
2018–19	Bethel College	30	30	31.6	.429	.318	.661	10.3	2.4	2.0	**1.1**	12.9
2019–20	Bethel College	32	32	34.5	.429	**.321**	.647	11.8	2.6	2.1	.7	13.3
2020–21	Bethel College	28	28	34.6	**.455**	.213	.662	**12.0**	4.7	2.0	.9	16.5
2021–22	Bethel College	31	31	**34.7**	**.455**	.316	**.679**	11.3	**5.2**	**2.5**	.6	**19.1**
2022–23	College of Charleston	**35**	**35**	27.2	.452	.214	.650	5.3	2.7	1.1	.7	4.3
