= 2022–23 Northeastern Huskies men's basketball team =

American college basketball season

2022–23 Northeastern Huskies men's basketball
- Conference: Colonial Athletic Association
- Record: 10–20 (6–12 CAA)
- Head coach: Bill Coen (17th season)
- Assistant coaches: Brian McDonald; Manny Adako; Joel Smith
- Home arena: Matthews Arena

2022–23 CAA men's basketball standings
	Conf.				Overall
Team	W		L	PCT	W		L	PCT
Hofstra	16	–	2	.889	25	–	10	.714
Charleston †	16	–	2	.889	31	–	4	.886
Towson	12	–	6	.667	21	–	12	.636
UNC Wilmington	12	–	6	.667	24	–	10	.706
Drexel	10	–	8	.556	17	–	15	.531
Delaware	8	–	10	.444	17	–	16	.515
North Carolina A&T	8	–	10	.444	13	–	19	.406
William & Mary	7	–	11	.389	13	–	20	.394
Elon	6	–	12	.333	8	–	24	.250
Stony Brook	6	–	12	.333	11	–	22	.333
Northeastern	6	–	12	.333	10	–	20	.333
Hampton	5	–	13	.278	8	–	24	.250
Monmouth	5	–	13	.278	7	–	26	.212
† 2023 CAA tournament winner

The 2022–23 Northeastern Huskies men's basketball team represented Northeastern University in the 2022–23 NCAA Division I men's basketball season. The Huskies, led by 17th-year head coach Bill Coen, played their home games at Matthews Arena in Boston, Massachusetts as members of the Colonial Athletic Association (CAA).

== Previous season ==
The Huskies finished the 2021–22 season 9–22, 2–16 in CAA play, to finish in last place. As the No. 9 seed, they defeated No. 8 seed William & Mary in the first round of the CAA tournament, before falling to top-seeded Towson in the quarterfinals.

== Roster ==
2022–23 Northeastern Huskies men's basketball team
Players
Coaches

Pos.	#	Name	Height	Weight	Year	Previous school	Hometown
G	1	Masai Troutman	6 ft 6 in (1.98 m)	194 lb (88 kg)	Fr	St. Andrew's Episcopal School	Frederick, MD
G	2	Glen McClintock	6 ft 2 in (1.88 m)	201 lb (91 kg)	Jr	Air Force	Kansas City, MO
G	3	Chase Cormier	6 ft 2 in (1.88 m)	166 lb (75 kg)	Fr	Milton High School	Milton, GA
G	4	Rashad King	6 ft 6 in (1.98 m)	198 lb (90 kg)	Fr	Evans High School	Evans, GA
G	10	Harold Woods	6 ft 5 in (1.96 m)	194 lb (88 kg)	Fr	Hammond High School	Hammond, IN
G	11	Jahmyl Telfort	6 ft 7 in (2.01 m)	224 lb (102 kg)	Jr	New Hampton School	Boucherville, QC
F	12	Alexander Nwagha	6 ft 8 in (2.03 m)	223 lb (101 kg)	Jr	Orangeville Prep	Milton, ON
G/F	13	Jared Turner	6 ft 8 in (2.03 m)	198 lb (90 kg)	Fr	Gonzaga College High School	Silver Spring, MD
F	15	Coleman Stucke	6 ft 7 in (2.01 m)	226 lb (103 kg)	Jr	Orangeville Prep	Oakville, ON
G	23	Joe Pridgen	6 ft 5 in (1.96 m)	223 lb (101 kg)	RS Jr	UNC Wilmington	Winchendon, MA
F	33	Chris Doherty	6 ft 7 in (2.01 m)	240 lb (109 kg)	RS Sr	Notre Dame	Marlborough, MA
C	45	Collin Metcalf	6 ft 9 in (2.06 m)	227 lb (103 kg)	Fr	Mercersburg Academy	Nortorf, Germany
G	55	To Randriasalama	6 ft 3 in (1.91 m)	178 lb (81 kg)	So	Collège Jean-de-Brébeuf	Montreal, QC

Head coach

- Bill Coen (Hamilton College)

Assistant coach(es)

- Brian McDonald (Northeastern)
- Manny Adako (Northeastern)
- Joel Smith (Northeastern)

Legend

- (C) Team captain
- (S) Suspended
- (I) Ineligible
- (W) Walk-on
- Injured
- Current redshirt

Roster
Last update: November 11, 2022

== Schedule and results ==
Date time, TV	Rank^{#}	Opponent^{#}	Result	Record	Site (attendance) city, state
Non-conference regular season
November 7, 2022*; 7:30 p.m., ESPN+		at Boston University	L 63–72	0–1	Case Gym (1,971); Boston, MA
November 12, 2022*; 8:00 p.m., FS2		at Providence	L 65–89	0–2	Amica Mutual Pavilion (12,011); Providence, RI
November 16, 2022*; 7:00 p.m., NESN/FloHoops		Harvard	L 69–70	0–3	Matthews Arena (1,339); Boston, MA
November 19, 2022*; 5:00 p.m., ACCN		at Syracuse	L 48–76	0–4	JMA Wireless Dome (15,668); Syracuse, NY
November 24, 2022*; 12:00 p.m.		vs. Manhattan; London Basketball Classic	W 69–67 ^{OT}	1–4	Copper Box Arena (1,551); London, England
November 26, 2022*; 12:00 p.m.		vs. Princeton; London Basketball Classic	L 54–56	1–5	Copper Box Arena (2,074); London, England
December 2, 2022*; 7:30 p.m., ACCNX		at Georgia Tech	L 63–81	1–6	McCamish Pavilion (3,494); Atlanta, GA
December 4, 2022*; 2:00 p.m., NESN/FloHoops		Georgia State	W 66–46	2–6	Matthews Arena (627); Boston, MA
December 10, 2022*; 2:00 p.m., NESN/FloHoops		Holy Cross	W 59–58	3–6	Matthews Arena (837); Boston, MA
December 18, 2022*; 2:00 p.m., ESPN+		at UIC	L 73–81	3–7	Credit Union 1 Arena (1,218); Chicago, IL
December 21, 2022*; 1:00 p.m., ESPN+		at Davidson	W 73–70	4–7	John M. Belk Arena (3,589); Davidson, NC
CAA regular season
December 29, 2022; 7:00 p.m.		North Carolina A&T	W 88–76	5–7 (1–0)	Matthews Arena (817); Boston, MA
December 31, 2022; 12:00 p.m., CBSSN		Stony Brook	L 61–65	5–8 (1–1)	Matthews Arena (801); Boston, MA
January 5, 2023; 7:00 p.m., FloHoops		at William & Mary	L 66–69	5–9 (1–2)	Kaplan Arena (1,777); Williamsburg, VA
January 7, 2023; 4:00 p.m., FloHoops		at Hampton	W 79–63	6–9 (2–2)	Hampton Convocation Center; Hampton, VA
January 14, 2023; 12:00 p.m., FloHoops		Drexel	L 55–76	6–10 (2–3)	Matthews Arena (912); Boston, MA
January 16, 2023; 6:00 p.m., NESN/FloHoops		Delaware	W 59–58	7–10 (3–3)	Matthews Arena (716); Boston, MA
January 19, 2023; 7:00 p.m., FloHoops		at Stony Brook	W 79–66	8–10 (4–3)	Island Federal Arena (1,651); Stony Brook, NY
January 21, 2023; 12:00 p.m., FloHoops		No. 18 College of Charleston	L 61–87	8–11 (4–4)	Matthews Arena (1,437); Boston, MA
January 26, 2023; 7:00 p.m., FloHoops		at Towson	L 63–72	8–12 (4–5)	SECU Arena (1,212); Towson, MD
January 28, 2023; 12:00 p.m., CBSSN		at Delaware	L 78–81	8–13 (4–6)	Bob Carpenter Center (2,561); Newark, DE
February 4, 2023; 2:00 p.m., NESN/FloHoops		Elon	L 73–74	8–14 (4–7)	Matthews Arena (1,322); Boston, MA
February 8, 2023; 6:00 p.m., CBSSN		Hofstra	L 53–72	8–15 (4–8)	Matthews Arena (899); Boston, MA
February 11, 2023; 7:00 p.m., FloHoops		at UNC Wilmington	L 59–71	8–16 (4–9)	Trask Coliseum (5,221); Wilmington, NC
February 13, 2023; 7:00 p.m., FloHoops		at College of Charleston	L 63–99	8–17 (4–10)	TD Arena (4,564); Charleston, SC
February 16, 2023; 7:00 p.m., NESN+/FloHoops		Monmouth	W 77–62	9–17 (5–10)	Matthews Arena (583); Boston, MA
February 18, 2023; 12:00 p.m., NESN+/FloHoops		William & Mary	W 69–24	10–17 (6–10)	Matthews Arena (1,011); Boston, MA
February 23, 2023; 7:00 p.m., FloHoops		at Drexel	L 48–75	10–18 (6–11)	Daskalakis Athletic Center (1,410); Philadelphia, PA
February 25, 2023; 2:00 p.m., CBSSN		at Hofstra	L 52–84	10–19 (6–12)	Mack Sports Complex (3,616); Hempstead, NY
CAA tournament
March 4, 2023; 8:30 p.m., FloHoops	(11)	vs. (6) Delaware; Second round	L 74–77 ^{OT}	10–20	Entertainment and Sports Arena (2,067); Washington, D.C.
*Non-conference game. ^{#}Rankings from AP poll. (#) Tournament seedings in parentheses. All times are in Eastern.
