= 2022–23 Stony Brook Seawolves men's basketball team =

American college basketball season

2022–23 Stony Brook Seawolves men's basketball
- Conference: Colonial Athletic Association
- Record: 11–22 (6–12 CAA)
- Head coach: Geno Ford (4th season)
- Associate head coach: Dan Rickard
- Assistant coaches: Jalen Avery; Jaden Uken
- Home arena: Island Federal Arena

2022–23 CAA men's basketball standings
	Conf.				Overall
Team	W		L	PCT	W		L	PCT
Hofstra	16	–	2	.889	25	–	10	.714
Charleston †	16	–	2	.889	31	–	4	.886
Towson	12	–	6	.667	21	–	12	.636
UNC Wilmington	12	–	6	.667	24	–	10	.706
Drexel	10	–	8	.556	17	–	15	.531
Delaware	8	–	10	.444	17	–	16	.515
North Carolina A&T	8	–	10	.444	13	–	19	.406
William & Mary	7	–	11	.389	13	–	20	.394
Elon	6	–	12	.333	8	–	24	.250
Stony Brook	6	–	12	.333	11	–	22	.333
Northeastern	6	–	12	.333	10	–	20	.333
Hampton	5	–	13	.278	8	–	24	.250
Monmouth	5	–	13	.278	7	–	26	.212
† 2023 CAA tournament winner

The 2022–23 Stony Brook Seawolves men's basketball team represented Stony Brook University in the 2022–23 NCAA Division I men's basketball season. The Seawolves, led by fourth-year head coach Geno Ford, played their home games at the Island Federal Arena in Stony Brook, New York as first-year members of the Colonial Athletic Association (CAA). They finished the season 10–21, 6–12 in CAA play, to finish in a three-way tie for 9th place. In the CAA tournament, they defeated North Carolina A&T in the second round before falling to College of Charleston in the quarterfinals.

== Previous season ==
The Seawolves finished the 2021–22 season 18–13, 10–8 in America East play, to finish in a tie for third place. Due to the team's impending move to the Colonial Athletic Association, the school was barred from participating in the America East tournament due to a conference bylaw.

== Roster ==
2022–23 Stony Brook Seawolves men's basketball team
Players
Coaches

Pos.	#	Name	Height	Weight	Year	Previous school	Hometown
G	1	Sabry Philip	6 ft 4 in (1.93 m)	190 lb (86 kg)	Sr	Navarro College	Edmonton, AB
F	2	Frankie Policelli	6 ft 7 in (2.01 m)	215 lb (98 kg)	GS	Dayton	New Hartford, NY
G	3	Toby Onyekonwu	6 ft 0 in (1.83 m)	170 lb (77 kg)	Fr	Joliet West HS	Joliet, IL
G	5	Aaron Clarke	6 ft 1 in (1.85 m)	185 lb (84 kg)	GS	Sacred Heart	Parsippany, NJ
G	10	Kaine Roberts	6 ft 2 in (1.88 m)	175 lb (79 kg)	So	Santa Margarita HS	Tokyo, Japan
G	11	Tanahj Pettway	6 ft 2 in (1.88 m)	185 lb (84 kg)	Jr	Indian River State College	Worcester, MA
G	13	Dean Noll	6 ft 2 in (1.88 m)	180 lb (82 kg)	GS	Cornell	Medford, NJ
G	14	Tyler Stephenson-Moore	6 ft 3 in (1.91 m)	186 lb (84 kg)	Sr	Long Island Lutheran HS	Jamaica, NY
G	15	Andrew Heiden	6 ft 4 in (1.93 m)	185 lb (84 kg)	Fr	George C. Marshall HS	Vienna, VA
F	22	Kenan Sarvan	6 ft 10 in (2.08 m)	225 lb (102 kg)	Jr	Mineral Area College	Heeze, Netherlands
G	24	Jared Frey	6 ft 4 in (1.93 m)	170 lb (77 kg)	Fr	Andrews Osborne Academy	Columbus, OH
C	32	Keenan Fitzmorris	7 ft 0 in (2.13 m)	235 lb (107 kg)	GS	Stanford	Overland Park, KS
F	33	Leon Nahar	6 ft 10 in (2.08 m)	198 lb (90 kg)	Fr	Asheville School	Alkmaar, Netherlands
C	34	Rocco Muratori	7 ft 3 in (2.21 m)	270 lb (122 kg)	Fr	IMG Academy	West Lafayette, IN

Head coach

- Geno Ford (Ohio)

Assistant coach(es)

- Dan Rickard (Stony Brook)
- Jalen Avery (Kent State)
- Jaden Uken (Nebraska)

Legend

- (C) Team captain
- (S) Suspended
- (I) Ineligible
- (W) Walk-on
- Injured
- Current redshirt

Roster
Last update: December 12, 2022

== Schedule and results ==
Date time, TV	Rank^{#}	Opponent^{#}	Result	Record	Site (attendance) city, state
Non-conference regular season
November 7, 2022*; 8:00 p.m., SECN+		at Florida	L 45–81	0–1	O'Connell Center (7,377); Gainesville, FL
November 11, 2022*; 6:31 p.m., FloHoops		Miami Hamilton	W 86–65	1–1	Island Federal Arena (2,240); Stony Brook, NY
November 15, 2022*; 7:00 p.m., ESPN+		at Rhode Island	L 64–74	1–2	Ryan Center (4,484); Kingston, RI
November 17, 2022*; 7:00 p.m., ESPN+		at Brown	L 53–64	1–3	Pizzitola Sports Center (408); Providence, RI
November 23, 2022*; 7:00 p.m.		at FIU; Florida International Tournament	L 50–83	1–4	Ocean Bank Convocation Center (676); Miami, FL
November 25, 2022*; 5:30 p.m.		vs. Eastern Washington; Florida International Tournament	L 52–81	1–5	Ocean Bank Convocation Center (35); Miami, FL
November 29, 2022*; 6:31 p.m., FloHoops		St. Joseph's (LI)	W 89–48	2–5	Island Federal Arena (2,074); Stony Brook, NY
December 3, 2022*; 6:31 p.m., SNY/FloHoops		Yale	L 72–77	2–6	Island Federal Arena (2,515); Stony Brook, NY
December 9, 2022*; 6:00 p.m., ESPN+		at Bryant	L 60–79	2–7	Chace Athletic Center (900); Smithfield, RI
December 12, 2022*; 6:31 p.m., SNY/FloHoops		Sacred Heart	W 71–64	3–7	Island Federal Arena (1,708); Stony Brook, NY
December 15, 2022*; 7:00 p.m.		at Wagner	L 55–58	3–8	Spiro Sports Center (742); Staten Island, NY
December 18, 2022*; 1:00 p.m., SNY/FloHoops		Army	W 66–59	4–8	Island Federal Arena (1,726); Stony Brook, NY
December 22, 2022*; 6:00 p.m., ESPN+		at West Virginia	L 64–75	4–9	WVU Coliseum; Morgantown, WV
CAA regular season
December 31, 2022; 12:00 p.m., CBSSN		at Northeastern	W 65–61	5–9 (1–0)	Matthews Arena (801); Boston, MA
January 5, 2023; 7:00 p.m., FloHoops		at Monmouth	W 67–56	6–9 (2–0)	OceanFirst Bank Center (1,224); West Long Branch, NJ
January 7, 2023; 6:31 p.m., SNY/FloHoops		Towson	L 55–67	6–10 (2–1)	Island Federal Arena (2,125); Stony Brook, NY
January 12, 2023; 7:00 p.m., CBSSN		Drexel	W 67–66	7–10 (3–1)	Island Federal Arena (2,840); Stony Brook, NY
January 14, 2023; 2:00 p.m., FloHoops		at North Carolina A&T	L 59–61	7–11 (3–2)	Corbett Sports Center (1,346); Greensboro, NC
January 19, 2023; 7:00 p.m., SNY/FloHoops		Northeastern	L 66–79	7–12 (3–3)	Island Federal Arena (1,651); Stony Brook, NY
January 21, 2023; 1:00 p.m., FloHoops		UNC Wilmington	L 51–62	7–13 (3–4)	Island Federal Arena (2,030); Stony Brook, NY
January 26, 2023; 7:00 p.m., FloHoops		at William & Mary	L 74–77	7–14 (3–5)	Kaplan Arena (2,616); Williamsburg, VA
January 28, 2023; 4:00 p.m., FloHoops		at Hampton	W 71–66	8–14 (4–5)	Hampton Convocation Center; Hampton, VA
February 2, 2023; 7:00 p.m., SNY/FloHoops		Elon	L 55–69	8–15 (4–6)	Island Federal Arena (1,651); Stony Brook, NY
February 4, 2023; 4:00 p.m., FloHoops		at Hofstra	L 58–79	8–16 (4–7)	Mack Sports Complex (3,901); Hempstead, NY
February 8, 2023; 6:31 p.m., FloHoops		Monmouth	L 54–61	8–17 (4–8)	Island Federal Arena (2,070); Stony Brook, NY
February 11, 2023; 2:00 p.m., FloHoops		North Carolina A&T	W 69–59	9–17 (5–8)	Island Federal Arena (2,125); Stony Brook, NY
February 13, 2023; 7:00 p.m., FloHoops		at Delaware	L 60–71	9–18 (5–9)	Bob Carpenter Center (2,449); Newark, DE
February 16, 2023; 7:00 p.m., SNY/FloHoops		William & Mary	W 71–66	10–18 (6–9)	Island Federal Arena (1,709); Stony Brook, NY
February 18, 2023; 6:31 p.m., SNY/FloHoops		Hofstra	L 65–68	10–19 (6–10)	Island Federal Arena (4,009); Stony Brook, NY
February 23, 2023; 7:00 p.m., FloHoops		at UNC Wilmington	L 69–76	10–20 (6–11)	Trask Coliseum (3,707); Wilmington, NC
February 25, 2023; 4:00 p.m., FloHoops		at College of Charleston	L 52–92	10–21 (6–12)	TD Arena (5,116); Charleston, SC
CAA tournament
March 4, 2023; 6:00 p.m., FloHoops	(10)	vs. (7) North Carolina A&T; Second round	W 76–61	11–21	Entertainment and Sports Arena; Washington, D.C.
March 5, 2023; 6:00 p.m., FloHoops	(10)	vs. (2) College of Charleston; Quarterfinals	L 52–74	11–22	Entertainment and Sports Arena; Washington, D.C.
*Non-conference game. ^{#}Rankings from AP poll. (#) Tournament seedings in parentheses. All times are in Eastern.
