= 2022–23 Delaware Fightin' Blue Hens men's basketball team =

American college basketball season

2022–23 Delaware Fightin' Blue Hens men's basketball
- Conference: Colonial Athletic Association
- Record: 17–16 (8–10 CAA)
- Head coach: Martin Ingelsby (7th season)
- Associate head coach: Bill Phillips
- Assistant coaches: Torrian Jones; James Robinson III
- Home arena: Bob Carpenter Center

2022–23 CAA men's basketball standings
	Conf.				Overall
Team	W		L	PCT	W		L	PCT
Hofstra	16	–	2	.889	25	–	10	.714
Charleston †	16	–	2	.889	31	–	4	.886
Towson	12	–	6	.667	21	–	12	.636
UNC Wilmington	12	–	6	.667	24	–	10	.706
Drexel	10	–	8	.556	17	–	15	.531
Delaware	8	–	10	.444	17	–	16	.515
North Carolina A&T	8	–	10	.444	13	–	19	.406
William & Mary	7	–	11	.389	13	–	20	.394
Elon	6	–	12	.333	8	–	24	.250
Stony Brook	6	–	12	.333	11	–	22	.333
Northeastern	6	–	12	.333	10	–	20	.333
Hampton	5	–	13	.278	8	–	24	.250
Monmouth	5	–	13	.278	7	–	26	.212
† 2023 CAA tournament winner

The 2022–23 Delaware Fightin' Blue Hens men's basketball team represented the University of Delaware in the 2022–23 NCAA Division I men's basketball season. The Fightin' Blue Hens, led by seventh-year head coach Martin Ingelsby, played their home games at the Bob Carpenter Center in Newark, Delaware as members of the Colonial Athletic Association (CAA).

== Previous season ==
The Fightin' Blue Hens finished the 2021–22 season 22–13, 10–8 in CAA play, to finish a tie for fourth place. As the No. 5 seed, they defeated Drexel, Towson and UNC Wilmington to win the CAA tournament. They received the conference's automatic bid to the NCAA tournament as the No. 15 seed in the South Region, where they lost in the first round to Villanova.

== Roster ==
2022–23 Delaware Fightin' Blue Hens men's basketball team
Players
Coaches

Pos.	#	Name	Height	Weight	Year	Previous school	Hometown
G	0	Jameer Nelson Jr.	6 ft 1 in (1.85 m)	200 lb (91 kg)	RS Jr	George Washington	Haverford, PA
G	1	LJ Owens	6 ft 3 in (1.91 m)	165 lb (75 kg)	GS	UMBC	Annapolis, MD
G	2	Fred Rullo IV	5 ft 11 in (1.8 m)	165 lb (75 kg)	Sr	Devon Prep	Newtown Square, PA
G	3	Logan Curtis	6 ft 3 in (1.91 m)	185 lb (84 kg)	RS Jr	East Carolina	Baltimore, MD
G	4	Gianmarco Arletti	6 ft 6 in (1.98 m)	205 lb (93 kg)	Jr	Holy Cross Prep	Bologna, Italy
G	5	Christian Ray	6 ft 6 in (1.98 m)	210 lb (95 kg)	Sr	La Salle	Gap, PA
G	10	Johnny McCoy	6 ft 5 in (1.96 m)	190 lb (86 kg)	RS Jr	Tilton School	Mansfield, MA
G	11	Cavan Reilly	6 ft 4 in (1.93 m)	188 lb (85 kg)	Fr	Bishop O'Connell HS	Arlington, VA
F	12	Houston Emory	6 ft 9 in (2.06 m)	195 lb (88 kg)	Fr	Blue Ridge School	Devon, PA
F	13	Jyáre Davis	6 ft 7 in (2.01 m)	215 lb (98 kg)	RS So	Providence	Newark, DE
G	14	Ebby Asamoah	6 ft 4 in (1.93 m)	200 lb (91 kg)	Sr	Magruder HS	Rockville, MD
F	15	Aleks Novakovich	6 ft 9 in (2.06 m)	230 lb (104 kg)	RS Sr	Don Bosco Institute	Hobart, IN
F	23	Gabe Moss	6 ft 8 in (2.03 m)	218 lb (99 kg)	Fr	The Hill School	Pottstown, PA
G	24	Wes Peterson	6 ft 6 in (1.98 m)	180 lb (82 kg)	So	Bishop O'Connell HS	Arlington, VA
F	34	O.D. Ogunbo	6 ft 8 in (2.03 m)	205 lb (93 kg)	Jr	Delcastle HS	Lagos, Nigeria
F	45	Nigel Shadd	6 ft 9 in (2.06 m)	260 lb (118 kg)	GS	Pacific	Mesa, AZ

Head coach

- Martin Ingelsby (Notre Dame)

Assistant coach(es)

- Bill Phillips (Saint Joseph's)
- Torrian Jones (Notre Dame)
- James Robinson III (Pittsburgh)

Legend

- (C) Team captain
- (S) Suspended
- (I) Ineligible
- (W) Walk-on
- Injured
- Current redshirt

Roster
Last update: December 12, 2022

== Schedule and results ==
Date time, TV	Rank^{#}	Opponent^{#}	Result	Record	Site (attendance) city, state
Non-conference regular season
November 7, 2022*; 7:00 p.m., FloHoops		Wilmington	W 78–54	1–0	Bob Carpenter Center (2,255); Newark, DE
November 11, 2022*; 5:00 p.m., MW Network		at Air Force	L 71–75	1–1	Clune Arena (1,625); Colorado Springs, CO
November 18, 2022*; 7:00 p.m., ACC RSN		at No. 7 Duke	L 58–92	1–2	Cameron Indoor Stadium (9,314); Durham, NC
November 25, 2022*; 2:00 p.m., ESPN+		vs. Colgate; Cathedral Classic	W 72–68	2–2	The Palestra; Philadelphia, PA
November 26, 2022*; 2:00 p.m., ESPN+		vs. Hartford; Cathedral Classic	W 78–50	3–2	The Palestra; Philadelphia, PA
November 27, 2022*; 4:30 p.m., ESPN+		at Penn; Cathedral Classic	L 73–86	3–3	The Palestra (1,586); Philadelphia, PA
December 1, 2022*; 7:00 p.m., FloHoops		Cornell	L 67–74	3–4	Bob Carpenter Center (1,426); Newark, DE
December 3, 2022*; 2:00 p.m., NBCSPHI		Davidson	W 69–67	4–4	Bob Carpenter Center (1,859); Newark, DE
December 7, 2022*; 7:00 p.m., FloHoops		Delaware State	W 77–69	5–4	Bob Carpenter Center (2,260); Newark, DE
December 11, 2022*; 2:00 p.m., FloHoops		Siena	W 75–64	6–4	Bob Carpenter Center (1,554); Newark, DE
December 16, 2022*; 7:00 p.m., ESPN+		at Princeton	W 76–69	7–4	Jadwin Gymnasium (1,599); Princeton, NJ
December 19, 2022*; 7:00 p.m., ESPN+		at Rider	W 60–59	8–4	Alumni Gymnasium (1,650); Lawrenceville, NJ
December 21, 2022*; 7:00 p.m., FloHoops		Ohio	L 76–95	8–5	Bob Carpenter Center (1,568); Newark, DE
CAA regular season
December 29, 2022; 7:00 p.m., CBSSN		Hofstra	L 73–87	8–6 (0–1)	Bob Carpenter Center (2,121); Newark, DE
December 31, 2022; 2:00 p.m., FloHoops		Elon	W 57–52	9–6 (1–1)	Bob Carpenter Center (1,895); Newark, DE
January 7, 2023; 5:00 p.m., CBSSN		at No. 23 College of Charleston	L 64–75	9–7 (1–2)	TD Arena (5,162); Charleston, SC
January 11, 2023; 7:00 p.m., FloHoops		Towson	W 72–59	10–7 (2–2)	Bob Carpenter Center (1,671); Newark, DE
January 14, 2023; 2:00 p.m., FloHoops		at Hofstra	L 62–86	10–8 (2–3)	Mack Sports Complex (2,037); Hempstead, NY
January 16, 2023; 6:00 p.m., FloHoops		at Northeastern	L 58–59	10–9 (2–4)	Matthews Arena (716); Boston, MA
January 19, 2023; 7:00 p.m., FloHoops		William & Mary	W 80–53	11–9 (3–4)	Bob Carpenter Center (2,192); Newark, DE
January 21, 2023; 2:00 p.m., FloHoops		at Drexel	L 74–77 ^{OT}	11–10 (3–5)	Daskalakis Athletic Center (2,407); Philadelphia, PA
January 26, 2023; 7:00 p.m., FloHoops		at Hampton	L 66–67	11–11 (3–6)	Hampton Convocation Center (2,705); Hampton, VA
January 28, 2023; 12:00 p.m., CBSSN		Northeastern	W 81–78	12–11 (4–6)	Bob Carpenter Center (2,561); Newark, DE
February 2, 2023; 7:00 p.m., FloHoops		at Monmouth	L 62–70	12–12 (4–7)	OceanFirst Bank Center (1,597); West Long Branch, NJ
February 4, 2023; 2:00 p.m., NBCSPHI		College of Charleston	L 67–84	12–13 (4–8)	Bob Carpenter Center (2,875); Newark, DE
February 8, 2023; 7:00 p.m., NBCSPHI		Drexel	L 54–58	12–14 (4–9)	Bob Carpenter Center (2,685); Newark, DE
February 13, 2023; 7:00 p.m., FloHoops		Stony Brook	W 71–60	13–14 (5–9)	Bob Carpenter Center (2,449); Newark, DE
February 16, 2023; 7:00 p.m., FloHoops		at Towson	L 72–95	13–15 (5–10)	SECU Arena (3,010); Towson, MD
February 18, 2023; 4:00 p.m., FloHoops		UNC Wilmington	W 75–66	14–15 (6–10)	Bob Carpenter Center (2,628); Newark, DE
February 23, 2023; 7:00 p.m., FloHoops		at North Carolina A&T	W 73–71	15–15 (7–10)	Corbett Sports Center (1,658); Greensboro, NC
February 25, 2023; 7:00 p.m., FloHoops		at Elon	W 70–54	16–15 (8–10)	Schar Center (1,721); Elon, NC
CAA tournament
March 4, 2023; 8:30 p.m., FloHoops	(6)	vs. (11) Northeastern; Second round	W 77–74 ^{OT}	17–15	Entertainment and Sports Arena (2,067); Washington, D.C.
March 5, 2023; 8:30 p.m., FloHoops	(6)	vs. (3) Towson; Quarterfinals	L 60–86	17–16	Entertainment and Sports Arena (2,089); Washington, D.C.
*Non-conference game. ^{#}Rankings from AP poll. (#) Tournament seedings in parentheses. All times are in Eastern.
