= 2023–24 Maine Black Bears men's basketball team =

American college basketball season

2023–24 Maine Black Bears men's basketball
- Conference: America East Conference
- Record: 15–17 (7–9 America East)
- Head coach: Chris Markwood (2nd season)
- Assistant coaches: Rob O'Driscoll; Pete Gash; Jordon Bronner
- Home arena: Cross Insurance Center

2023–24 America East Conference men's basketball standings
	Conf.				Overall
Team	W		L	PCT	W		L	PCT
Vermont †	15	–	1	.938	28	–	7	.800
UMass Lowell	11	–	5	.688	22	–	10	.688
Bryant	11	–	5	.688	20	–	13	.606
New Hampshire	7	–	9	.438	16	–	15	.516
Binghamton	7	–	9	.438	15	–	15	.500
Maine	7	–	9	.438	15	–	17	.469
UMBC	6	–	10	.375	11	–	21	.344
Albany	5	–	11	.313	13	–	19	.406
NJIT	3	–	13	.188	7	–	21	.250
† 2024 AmEast tournament winner

The 2023–24 Maine Black Bears men's basketball team represented the University of Maine in the 2023–24 NCAA Division I men's basketball season. The Black Bears, led by second-year head coach Chris Markwood, played their home games at Cross Insurance Center in Bangor, Maine, with some games at Memorial Gymnasium in Orono, Maine, as members of the America East Conference.

== Previous season ==
The Black Bears finished the 2022–23 season 13–17, 7–9 in America East play, to finish in seventh place. They lost in the quarterfinals of the America East Tournament to UMass Lowell.

== Roster ==
2023–24 Maine Black Bears men's basketball team
Players
Coaches

Pos.	#	Name	Height	Weight	Year	Previous school	Hometown
G	0	Logan Carey	6 ft 3 in (1.91 m)	—	Fr	St. Paul's School	Shelton, CT
G	1	Kellen Tynes	6 ft 3 in (1.91 m)	175 lb (79 kg)	Jr	Montana State	Dartmouth, NS
G	2	Ja'Shonté Wright-McLeish	6 ft 4 in (1.93 m)	185 lb (84 kg)	GS	Collège Jean-de-Brébeuf	Montreal, QC
G	3	Jaden Clayton	6 ft 4 in (1.93 m)	—	So	Fort Erie International Academy	Whitby, ON
F	4	Adam Cisse	6 ft 10 in (2.08 m)	220 lb (100 kg)	GS	Manhattan	The Bronx, NY
G	5	Isaac Bonilla	6 ft 0 in (1.83 m)	—	Fr	Bradford Christian Academy	Danville, NH
G	10	Okay Djamgouz	6 ft 5 in (1.96 m)	190 lb (86 kg)	GS	Drake	Oakville, ON
F	11	Kristians Feierbergs	6 ft 8 in (2.03 m)	—	Jr	GBA Academy	Riga, Latvia
F	12	Milos Nenadic	6 ft 10 in (2.08 m)	—	Jr	Western Reserve Academy	Kitchener, ON
F	14	AJ Lopez	6 ft 5 in (1.96 m)	170 lb (77 kg)	Jr	New Hampshire	Queens, NY
F	15	John Shea	6 ft 6 in (1.98 m)	—	So	Edward Little HS	Auburn, ME
G	22	Quion Burns	6 ft 6 in (1.98 m)	180 lb (82 kg)	Jr	LIU	White Plains, NY
G	23	Bryce Lausier	6 ft 4 in (1.93 m)	—	Sr	Saint Anselm	Glenburn, ME
F	25	Keelan Steele	6 ft 10 in (2.08 m)	—	So	Victory Academy	Alton, ON
G	31	Novak Perovic	6 ft 7 in (2.01 m)	—	Jr	Hoosac School	Belgrade, Serbia
F	32	Ayme Daguilh	6 ft 5 in (1.96 m)	—	So	Bridgton Academy	West Boylston, MA
F	44	Peter Filipovity	6 ft 7 in (2.01 m)	—	Sr	Utah State Eastern	Kaposvár, Hungary

Head coach

- Chris Markwood (Maine)

Assistant coach(es)

- Rob O'Driscoll (Villanova)
- Pete Gash (Chattanooga)
- Jordon Bronner (New Hampshire)

Legend

- (C) Team captain
- (S) Suspended
- (I) Ineligible
- (W) Walk-on
- Injured
- Current redshirt

Roster
Last update: November 11, 2023

== Schedule and results ==
Date time, TV	Rank^{#}	Opponent^{#}	Result	Record	Site (attendance) city, state
Non-conference regular season
November 6, 2023*; 7:00 p.m., ESPN+		at Charlotte	L 52–69	0–1	Dale F. Halton Arena (3,510); Charlotte, NC
November 8, 2023*; 6:00 p.m., ESPN+		UMaine Presque Isle	W 111–59	1–1	Memorial Gymnasium; Orono, ME
November 12, 2023*; 4:00 p.m., ESPN+		Merrimack	L 65–71	1–2	Memorial Gymnasium (815); Orono, ME
November 16, 2023*; 4:00 p.m., ESPN+		vs. Northwestern State; UNF MTE	W 78–65	2–2	UNF Arena (135); Jacksonville, FL
November 17, 2023*; 4:00 p.m., ESPN+		vs. Presbyterian; UNF MTE	W 80–66	3–2	UNF Arena (144); Jacksonville, FL
November 18, 2023*; 5:00 p.m., ESPN+		at North Florida; UNF MTE	L 58–67	3–3	UNF Arena (1,259); Jacksonville, FL
November 22, 2023*; 7:00 p.m., ESPN+		at South Florida	W 70–59	4–3	Yuengling Center (3,134); Tampa, FL
November 25, 2023*; 1:00 p.m., ESPN+		at Columbia	L 56–75	4–4	Levien Gymnasium (898); New York, NY
November 29, 2023*; 7:00 p.m., ESPN+		at Holy Cross	W 72–57	5–4	Hart Center (777); Worcester, MA
December 3, 2023*; 12:00 p.m., ESPN+		Brown	W 60–49	6–4	Memorial Gymnasium (631); Orono, ME
December 6, 2023*; 7:00 p.m., ESPN+		at Boston University	W 74–65	7–4	Case Gym (653); Boston, MA
December 9, 2023*; 2:00 p.m., ESPN+		Central Connecticut	W 69–56	8–4	Memorial Gymnasium (732); Orono, ME
December 18, 2023*; 7:00 p.m., ESPN+		at UCF	L 51–74	8–5	Addition Financial Arena (5,014); Orlando, FL
December 21, 2023*; 7:00 p.m., ESPN+		at FIU	L 74–82	8–6	Ocean Bank Convocation Center (602); Miami, FL
December 29, 2023*; 7:00 p.m., Peacock		at Minnesota	L 62–80	8–7	Williams Arena (8,658); Minneapolis, MN
America East Conference regular season
January 6, 2024; 2:00 p.m., ESPN+		at Vermont	L 58–65	8–8 (0–1)	Patrick Gym (2,704); Burlington, VT
January 11, 2024; 6:00 p.m., ESPN+		New Hampshire	L 74–79	8–9 (0–2)	Cross Insurance Center (612); Bangor, ME
January 18, 2024; 7:00 p.m., ESPN+		at UMBC	L 65–70	8–10 (0–3)	Chesapeake Employers Insurance Arena (365); Catonsville, MD
January 20, 2024; 2:00 p.m., ESPN+		at NJIT	W 70–64	9–10 (1–3)	Wellness and Events Center (655); Newark, NJ
January 25, 2024; 6:00 p.m., ESPN+		Albany	W 81–73	10–10 (2–3)	Memorial Gymnasium (724); Orono, ME
January 27, 2024; 2:00 p.m., ESPN+		Binghamton	L 50–51	10–11 (2–4)	Cross Insurance Center (1,287); Bangor, ME
February 1, 2024; 6:30 p.m., ESPN+		at UMass Lowell	L 62–76	10–12 (2–5)	Costello Athletic Center (768); Lowell, MA
February 3, 2024; 3:00 p.m., ESPN+		Bryant	W 79–72	11–12 (3–5)	Memorial Gymnasium (855); Orono, ME
February 10, 2024; 7:00 p.m., ESPN+		at New Hampshire	L 57–60	11–13 (3–6)	Lundholm Gym (1,017); Durham, NH
February 15, 2024; 7:00 p.m., ESPN+		at Bryant	L 72–77	11–14 (3–7)	Chace Athletic Center (1,001); Smithfield, RI
February 17, 2024; 3:00 p.m., ESPN+		Vermont	L 57–68	11–15 (3–8)	Memorial Gymnasium (940); Orono, ME
February 22, 2024; 6:00 p.m., ESPN+		UMBC	W 62–56	12–15 (4–8)	Memorial Gymnasium (647); Orono, ME
February 24, 2024; 2:00 p.m., ESPN+		NJIT	W 68–58	13–15 (5–8)	Memorial Gymnasium (689); Orono, ME
February 29, 2024; 6:00 p.m., ESPN+		at Binghamton	L 74–76 ^{OT}	13–16 (5–9)	Binghamton University Events Center (2,539); Vestal, NY
March 2, 2024; 4:00 p.m., ESPN+		at Albany	W 74–71 ^{OT}	14–16 (6–9)	Broadview Center (2,268); Albany, NY
March 5, 2024; 6:00 p.m., ESPN+		UMass Lowell	W 71–65	15–16 (7–9)	Memorial Gymnasium (647); Orono, ME
America East tournament
March 9, 2024; 2:00 p.m., ESPN+	(6)	at (3) Bryant; Quarterfinals	L 58–84	15–17	Chace Athletic Center (1,147); Smithfield, RI
*Non-conference game. ^{#}Rankings from AP poll. (#) Tournament seedings in parentheses. All times are in Eastern.
