= 2023–24 UMBC Retrievers men's basketball team =

Basketball team season

2023–24 UMBC Retrievers men's basketball
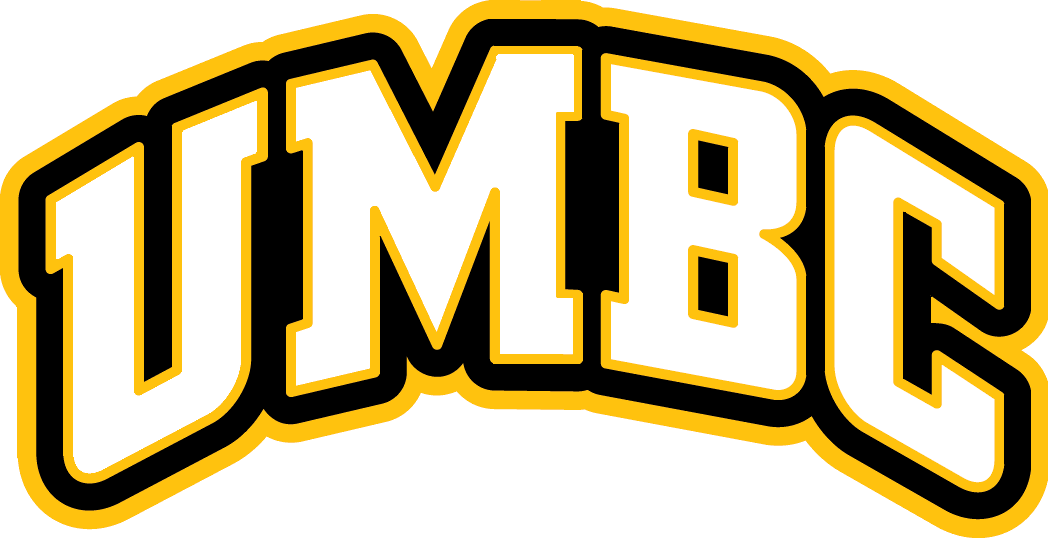
- Conference: America East Conference
- Record: 11–21 (6–10 America East)
- Head coach: Jim Ferry (3rd season)
- Assistant coaches: Danny Lawson; Evann Baker; Brian Baudinet
- Home arena: Chesapeake Employers Insurance Arena

2023–24 America East Conference men's basketball standings
	Conf.				Overall
Team	W		L	PCT	W		L	PCT
Vermont †	15	–	1	.938	28	–	7	.800
UMass Lowell	11	–	5	.688	22	–	10	.688
Bryant	11	–	5	.688	20	–	13	.606
New Hampshire	7	–	9	.438	16	–	15	.516
Binghamton	7	–	9	.438	15	–	15	.500
Maine	7	–	9	.438	15	–	17	.469
UMBC	6	–	10	.375	11	–	21	.344
Albany	5	–	11	.313	13	–	19	.406
NJIT	3	–	13	.188	7	–	21	.250
† 2024 AmEast tournament winner

The 2023–24 UMBC Retrievers men's basketball team represented the University of Maryland, Baltimore County during the 2023–24 NCAA Division I men's basketball season. The Retrievers, led by third-year head coach Jim Ferry, played their home games at the Chesapeake Employers Insurance Arena in Catonsville, Maryland as members of the America East Conference.

The Retrievers finished the season 11–21, 6–10 in America East play, to finish in seventh place. They were defeated by UMass Lowell in the quarterfinals of the America East tournament.

== Previous season ==
The Retrievers finished the 2022–23 season 18–14, 8–8 in America East play, to finish in a three-way tie for fourth place. They were defeated by Binghamton in the first round of the America East tournament.

== Roster ==
2023–24 UMBC Retrievers men's basketball team
Players
Coaches

Pos.	#	Name	Height	Weight	Year	Hometown
G/F	0	Regimantas Ciunys	6 ft 6 in (1.98 m)	190 lb (86 kg)	So	Vilnius, Lithuania
G	1	Anthony "Ace" Valentine	6 ft 3 in (1.91 m)	190 lb (86 kg)	Fr	Baltimore, MD
G	3	Isaac Varghese	6 ft 1 in (1.85 m)	170 lb (77 kg)	Fr	Jericho, NY
G	4	Marlon Short	6 ft 6 in (1.98 m)	190 lb (86 kg)	Jr	Richmond, CA
F/C	5	Max Lorca-Lloyd	6 ft 9 in (2.06 m)	230 lb (104 kg)	GS	Brooklyn, NY
G/F	10	Devan Sapp	6 ft 4 in (1.93 m)	215 lb (98 kg)	Jr	San Jose, CA
F/C	11	Khydarius Smith	6 ft 8 in (2.03 m)	220 lb (100 kg)	GS	Fort Mill, SC
F	12	Marcel Gardner	6 ft 8 in (2.03 m)	200 lb (91 kg)	Fr	Potomac, MD
G	13	Dion Brown	6 ft 3 in (1.91 m)	185 lb (84 kg)	So	Great Barrington, MA
G/F	14	Alpha Chibambe	6 ft 5 in (1.96 m)	210 lb (95 kg)	Fr	Kinshasa, Democratic Republic of the Congo
G	15	Ashton Reese	6 ft 5 in (1.96 m)	185 lb (84 kg)	Fr	Scottsdale, AZ
G	20	JC Harris	6 ft 1 in (1.85 m)	190 lb (86 kg)	Jr	Gaithersburg, MD
G	21	Franck Emmou	6 ft 5 in (1.96 m)	190 lb (86 kg)	Fr	Mansfield, TX
G	22	Ethan Lynch	6 ft 2 in (1.88 m)	230 lb (104 kg)	Sr	Washington, D.C.
G	23	Bryce Johnson	6 ft 4 in (1.93 m)	190 lb (86 kg)	Jr	Orlando, FL
G	24	Marcus Jr. Banks	6 ft 3 in (1.91 m)	195 lb (88 kg)	Jr	Hampton, VA

Head coach

- Jim Ferry (Keene State)

Assistant coach(es)

- Danny Lawson (Bentley)
- Evann Baker (Quinnipiac)
- Brian Baudinet (UMass)

Legend

- (C) Team captain
- (S) Suspended
- (I) Ineligible
- (W) Walk-on
- Injured
- Current redshirt

Roster
Last update: October 25, 2023

== Schedule and results ==
Date time, TV	Rank^{#}	Opponent^{#}	Result	Record	Site (attendance) city, state
Exhibition
October 29, 2023*; 4:00 p.m.		at Fordham; Able Athletics Charity Game	L 75–79	–	Rose Hill Gymnasium; The Bronx, NY
Non-conference regular season
November 6, 2023*; 7:00 p.m., ESPN+/ACCNX		at Louisville	L 93–94	0–1	KFC Yum! Center (11,010); Louisville, KY
November 11, 2023*; 3:30 p.m., ESPN+		Marist	L 59–65	0–2	Chesapeake Employers Insurance Arena (1,306); Catonsville, MD
November 14, 2023*; 6:00 p.m., ESPN+		Penn State York	W 84–65	1–2	Chesapeake Employers Insurance Arena (1,382); Catonsville, MD
November 17, 2023*; 11:00 a.m., ESPN+		Sacred Heart	W 85–80	2–2	Chesapeake Employers Insurance Arena (1,618); Catonsville, MD
November 19, 2023*; 1:00 p.m., ESPN+		Loyola (MD)	W 94–79	3–2	Chesapeake Employers Insurance Arena (1,183); Catonsville, MD
November 21, 2023*; 7:00 p.m., B1G		at Maryland	L 68–92	3–3	Xfinity Center (13,146); College Park, MD
November 25, 2023*; 2:00 p.m.		at William & Mary	L 81–96	3–4	Kaplan Arena (2,742); Williamsburg, VA
November 27, 2023*; 7:00 p.m.		at Hampton	W 80–76	4–4	Hampton Convocation Center (1,002); Hampton, VA
November 30, 2023*; 7:00 p.m.		at Coppin State	L 70–89	4–5	Physical Education Complex; Baltimore, MD
December 2, 2023*; 1:00 p.m., ESPN+		Lehigh	W 92–87	5–5	Chesapeake Employers Insurance Arena (1,325); Catonsville, MD
December 6, 2023*; 6:00 p.m.		at Morgan State	L 80–92	5–6	Talmadge L. Hill Field House (973); Baltimore, MD
December 9, 2023*; 1:00 p.m., MASN/ESPN+		Towson	L 73–89	5–7	Chesapeake Employers Insurance Arena (2,513); Catonsville, MD
December 12, 2023*; 7:00 p.m., ESPN+		at Saint Peter's	L 60–66	5–8	Run Baby Run Arena (560); Jersey City, NJ
December 20, 2023*; 7:00 p.m., B1G		at Iowa	L 81–103	5–9	Carver–Hawkeye Arena (8,357); Iowa City, IA
December 29, 2023*; 7:30 p.m., ESPN+		American	L 85–87	5–10	Chesapeake Employers Insurance Arena (1,087); Catonsville, MD
America East regular season
January 6, 2024; 1:00 p.m., ESPN+		Bryant	L 67–81	5–11 (0–1)	Chesapeake Employers Insurance Arena (715); Catonsville, MD
January 11, 2024; 7:00 p.m., ESPN+		at Vermont	L 72–77	5–12 (0–2)	Patrick Gym (2,052); Burlington, VT
January 13, 2024; 2:00 p.m., ESPN+		at UMass Lowell	L 82–86	5–13 (0–3)	Costello Athletic Center (626); Lowell, MA
January 18, 2024; 7:00 p.m., ESPN+		Maine	W 70–65	6–13 (1–3)	Chesapeake Employers Insurance Arena (365); Catonsville, MD
January 20, 2024; 1:00 p.m., ESPN+		New Hampshire	L 58–64	6–14 (1–4)	Chesapeake Employers Insurance Arena (468); Catonsville, MD
January 27, 2024; 7:00 p.m., ESPN+		NJIT	L 74–75	6–15 (1–5)	Chesapeake Employers Insurance Arena (1,685); Catonsville, MD
February 1, 2024; 7:00 p.m., ESPN+		at Bryant	L 95–99	6–16 (1–6)	Chace Athletic Center (975); Smithfield, RI
February 3, 2024; 7:00 p.m., ESPN+		at Albany	W 114–102	7–16 (2–6)	Broadview Center (3,709); Albany, NY
February 8, 2024; 7:00 p.m., ESPN+		UMass Lowell	L 80–93	7–17 (2–7)	Chesapeake Employers Insurance Arena (1,163); Catonsville, MD
February 10, 2024; 1:00 p.m., ESPN+		Vermont	L 70–72	7–18 (2–8)	Chesapeake Employers Insurance Arena (1,710); Catonsville, MD
February 15, 2024; 6:07 p.m., ESPN+		at Binghamton	W 89–78	8–18 (3–8)	Binghamton University Events Center (2,102); Vestal, NY
February 17, 2024; 1:00 p.m., ESPN+		Albany	W 80–75	9–18 (4–8)	Chesapeake Employers Insurance Arena (1,565); Catonsville, MD
February 22, 2024; 6:00 p.m., ESPN+		at Maine	L 56–62	9–19 (4–9)	Memorial Gymnasium (647); Orono, ME
February 24, 2024; 1:00 p.m., ESPN+		at New Hampshire	W 86–68	10–19 (5–9)	Lundholm Gym (760); Durham, NH
February 29, 2024; 7:00 p.m., ESPN+		at NJIT	W 79–60	11–19 (6–9)	Wellness and Events Center (515); Newark, NJ
March 5, 2024; 7:00 p.m., ESPN+		Binghamton	L 71–72	11–20 (6–10)	Chesapeake Employers Insurance Arena (1,875); Catonsville, MD
America East tournament
March 9, 2024; 3:00 p.m., ESPN+	(7)	at (2) UMass Lowell; Quarterfinals	L 89–94 ^{OT}	11–21	Costello Athletic Center (684); Lowell, MA
*Non-conference game. ^{#}Rankings from AP poll. (#) Tournament seedings in parentheses. All times are in Eastern.
