= 2023–24 Albany Great Danes men's basketball team =

American college basketball season

2023–24 Albany Great Danes men's basketball
- Conference: America East Conference
- Record: 13–19 (5–11 America East)
- Head coach: Dwayne Killings (3rd season)
- Assistant coaches: Jim Whitesell; KJ Baptiste; Ryan Daly; Dan Madhavapallil
- Home arena: Broadview Center

2023–24 America East Conference men's basketball standings
	Conf.				Overall
Team	W		L	PCT	W		L	PCT
Vermont †	15	–	1	.938	28	–	7	.800
UMass Lowell	11	–	5	.688	22	–	10	.688
Bryant	11	–	5	.688	20	–	13	.606
New Hampshire	7	–	9	.438	16	–	15	.516
Binghamton	7	–	9	.438	15	–	15	.500
Maine	7	–	9	.438	15	–	17	.469
UMBC	6	–	10	.375	11	–	21	.344
Albany	5	–	11	.313	13	–	19	.406
NJIT	3	–	13	.188	7	–	21	.250
† 2024 AmEast tournament winner

The 2023–24 Albany Great Danes men's basketball team represented the University at Albany, SUNY during the 2023–24 NCAA Division I men's basketball season. They were members of the America East Conference and played their home games at the Broadview Center in Albany, New York. They were led by third-year head coach Dwayne Killings.

== Previous season ==
The Great Danes finished the 2022–23 season 8–23, 3–13 in America East play, to finish in last place. They failed to qualify for the America East tournament.

== Roster ==
2023–24 Albany Great Danes men's basketball team
Players
Coaches

Pos.	#	Name	Height	Weight	Year	Previous school	Hometown
F	0	Marcus Filien	6 ft 7 in (2.01 m)	—	GS	Cornell	Rensselaer, NY
G	1	Amar'e Marshall	6 ft 4 in (1.93 m)	—	RS So	Hofstra	Montclair, NJ
F	2	Aaron Reddish	6 ft 7 in (2.01 m)	195 lb (88 kg)	Jr	Pebblebrook High School	Norristown, PA
G	3	Ny'Mire Little	6 ft 4 in (1.93 m)	205 lb (93 kg)	RS So	Westtown School	Chester, PA
G	4	Sebastian Thomas	6 ft 1 in (1.85 m)	—	Jr	Rhode Island	Providence, RI
F	5	Jack Margoupis	6 ft 8 in (2.03 m)	—	Fr	Cushing Academy	Sutton, MA
F	11	Muneer Newton	6 ft 5 in (1.96 m)	—	Jr	William Penn	Philadelphia, PA
F	12	Justin Neely	6 ft 6 in (1.98 m)	210 lb (95 kg)	RS So	West Oaks Academy	Miami, FL
G	14	Zach Matulu (W)	6 ft 2 in (1.88 m)	—	Fr	Shaker High School	Albany, NY
F	15	Jonathan Beagle	6 ft 10 in (2.08 m)	240 lb (109 kg)	So	St. Thomas More School	Hudson Falls, NY
G	22	Will Amica	6 ft 0 in (1.83 m)	170 lb (77 kg)	Sr	West Genesee High School	Syracuse, NY
G	23	Tyler Bertram	6 ft 3 in (1.91 m)	—	GS	UAB	Cooperstown, NY
G	24	Zane Adnan	6 ft 2 in (1.88 m)	—	Fr	Bullis School	Gaithersburg, MD
F	33	Mike Walker (W)	6 ft 7 in (2.01 m)	225 lb (102 kg)	Fr	Xaverian High School	Brooklyn, NY
G	44	Marcus Jackson	6 ft 2 in (1.88 m)	180 lb (82 kg)	So	Cushing Academy	Amsterdam, NY

Head coach

- Dwayne Killings (Hampton)

Assistant coach(es)

- Jim Whitesell (Luther)
- KJ Baptiste (Brandeis)
- Ryan Daly (Saint Joseph's)
- Dan Madhavapallil (Marquette)

Legend

- (C) Team captain
- (S) Suspended
- (I) Ineligible
- (W) Walk-on
- Injured
- Current redshirt

Roster
Last update: November 12, 2023

== Schedule and results ==
Date time, TV	Rank^{#}	Opponent^{#}	Result	Record	Site (attendance) city, state
Non-conference regular season
November 7, 2023*; 7:00 p.m., ESPN+		at UMass	L 71–92	0–1	Mullins Center (3,015); Amherst, MA
November 11, 2023*; 7:00 p.m., ESPN+		at Columbia	W 78–75	1–1	Levien Gymnasium (761); New York, NY
November 15, 2023*; 6:30 p.m., FS1		at Seton Hall	L 71–96	1–2	Prudential Center (7,712); Newark, NJ
November 19, 2023*; 2:00 p.m., ESPN+		at Quinnipiac; Doc Sauers Classic	L 82–85	1–3	M&T Bank Arena (763); Hamden, CT
November 21, 2023*; 7:00 p.m., ESPN+		vs. Army; Doc Sauers Classic	W 62–59	2–3	Cool Insuring Arena (2,011); Glens Falls, NY
November 26, 2023*; 5:00 p.m., ESPN+		at Siena; Albany Cup	W 86–51	3–3	MVP Arena (7,605); Albany, NY
November 29, 2023*; 7:00 p.m., ESPN+		Boston University	W 86–72	4–3	Broadview Center (3,103); Albany, NY
December 2, 2023*; 5:00 p.m., ESPN+		Dartmouth	W 73–68	5–3	Broadview Center (2,075); Albany, NY
December 5, 2023*; 7:00 p.m., ESPN+		SUNY Potsdam	W 98–59	6–3	Broadview Center (1,653); Albany, NY
December 10, 2023*; 7:00 p.m., YES		vs. Temple; NABC Brooklyn Showcase	L 73–78	6–4	Barclays Center; Brooklyn, NY
December 16, 2023*; 2:00 p.m., FloHoops		at Drexel	L 52–71	6–5	Daskalakis Athletic Center; Philadelphia, PA
December 19, 2023*; 7:00 p.m., ESPN+		Sacred Heart	W 93–79	7–5	Broadview Center (1,415); Albany, NY
December 22, 2023*; 2:00 p.m., ESPN+		at South Florida	L 73–89	7–6	Yuengling Center (2,759); Tampa, FL
December 28, 2023*; 7:00 p.m., ESPN+		at LIU	W 86–69	8–6	Steinberg Wellness Center (1,704); Brooklyn, NY
January 2, 2024*; 7:30 p.m., ESPN+		at Harvard	L 71–76	8–7	Lavietes Pavilion (837); Cambridge, MA
America East regular season
January 6, 2024; 3:30 p.m., ESPN+		at NJIT	W 79–73	9–7 (1–0)	Wellness and Events Center (323); Newark, NJ
January 13, 2024; 4:00 p.m., ESPN+		Binghamton	W 95–75	10–7 (2–0)	Broadview Center (2,164); Albany, NY
January 18, 2024; 7:00 p.m., ESPN+		UMass Lowell	L 76–97	10–8 (2–1)	Broadview Center (2,004); Albany, NY
January 20, 2024; 7:00 p.m., ESPN+		Bryant	L 89–98	10–9 (2–2)	Broadview Center (2,501); Albany, NY
January 25, 2024; 6:00 p.m., ESPN+		at Maine	L 73–81	10–10 (2–3)	Memorial Gymnasium (724); Orono, ME
January 27, 2024; 12:00 p.m., ESPN+		at New Hampshire	W 86–79	11–10 (3–3)	Lundholm Gym (561); Durham, NH
February 1, 2024; 7:00 p.m., ESPN+		at Vermont	L 59–81	11–11 (3–4)	Patrick Gym (2,338); Burlington, VT
February 3, 2024; 7:00 p.m., ESPN+		UMBC	L 102–114	11–12 (3–5)	Broadview Center (3.709); Albany, NY
February 8, 2024; 6:07 p.m., ESPN+		at Binghamton	L 57–69	11–13 (3–6)	Binghamton University Events Center (2,543); Vestal, NY
February 15, 2024; 7:00 p.m., ESPN+		NJIT	W 83–58	12–13 (4–6)	Broadview Center (1,453); Albany, NY
February 17, 2024; 1:00 p.m., ESPN+		at UMBC	L 75–80	12–14 (4–7)	Chesapeake Employers Insurance Arena (1,565); Catonsville, MD
February 22, 2024; 7:00 p.m., ESPN+		Vermont	L 80–94	12–15 (4–8)	Broadview Center (2,541); Albany, NY
February 24, 2024; 1:00 p.m., ESPN+		at UMass Lowell	L 95–104	12–16 (4–9)	Costello Athletic Center (702); Lowell, MA
February 29, 2024; 7:00 p.m., ESPN+		New Hampshire	W 91–67	13–16 (5–9)	Broadview Center (1,505); Albany, NY
March 2, 2024; 4:00 p.m., ESPN+		Maine	L 71–74 ^{OT}	13–17 (5–10)	Broadview Center (2,268); Albany, NY
March 5, 2024; 7:00 p.m., ESPN+		at Bryant	L 79–83	13–18 (5–11)	Chace Athletic Center (669); Smithfield, RI
America East tournament
March 9, 2024; 3:00 p.m., ESPN+	(8)	at (1) Vermont; Quarterfinals	L 72–75	13–19	Patrick Gym (2,692); Burlington, VT
*Non-conference game. ^{#}Rankings from AP poll. (#) Tournament seedings in parentheses. All times are in Eastern.
