= 2023–24 New Hampshire Wildcats men's basketball team =

American college basketball season

2023–24 New Hampshire Wildcats men's basketball
- Conference: America East Conference
- Record: 16–15 (7–9 America East)
- Head coach: Nathan Davis (1st season)
- Associate head coach: Jimmy Allen
- Assistant coaches: Tyler Wilson; Luis Guzman
- Home arena: Lundholm Gym

2023–24 America East Conference men's basketball standings
	Conf.				Overall
Team	W		L	PCT	W		L	PCT
Vermont †	15	–	1	.938	28	–	7	.800
UMass Lowell	11	–	5	.688	22	–	10	.688
Bryant	11	–	5	.688	20	–	13	.606
New Hampshire	7	–	9	.438	16	–	15	.516
Binghamton	7	–	9	.438	15	–	15	.500
Maine	7	–	9	.438	15	–	17	.469
UMBC	6	–	10	.375	11	–	21	.344
Albany	5	–	11	.313	13	–	19	.406
NJIT	3	–	13	.188	7	–	21	.250
† 2024 AmEast tournament winner

The 2023–24 New Hampshire Wildcats men's basketball team represented the University of New Hampshire during the 2023–24 NCAA Division I men's basketball season. The Wildcats, who were led by first-year head coach Nathan Davis, played their home games at the Lundholm Gym located in Durham, New Hampshire as members of the America East Conference.

== Previous season ==
The Wildcats finished the 2022–23 season 15–15, 9–7 in America East play to finish in third place. They defeated Bryant in the quarterfinals of the America East Tournament, before losing to UMass Lowell in the semifinals.

On March 14, 2023, it was announced that head coach Bill Herrion's contract would not be renewed by the school, ending his 18-year tenure with the team. On April 7, 2023, it was announced that Bucknell head coach Nathan Davis would be named Herrion's successor.

== Roster ==
2023–24 New Hampshire Wildcats men's basketball team
Players
Coaches

Pos.	#	Name	Height	Weight	Year	Previous school	Hometown
G	0	Jon Willeman	6 ft 2 in (1.88 m)	177 lb (80 kg)	Sr	Lebanon HS	Lebanon, NH
G	1	Rex Sunderland	6 ft 4 in (1.93 m)	192 lb (87 kg)	So	Davis HS	Kaysville, UT
G	2	Dior Davis	6 ft 2 in (1.88 m)	155 lb (70 kg)	So	Ellsworth CC	New York, NY
F	3	Jaxson Baker (C)	6 ft 8 in (2.03 m)	215 lb (98 kg)	GS	Central Arkansas	Phoenix, AZ
G	4	Ahmad Robinson	5 ft 10 in (1.78 m)	172 lb (78 kg)	Jr	Western Texas College	West Orange, NJ
G	5	Naim Miller	6 ft 4 in (1.93 m)	205 lb (93 kg)	GS	Edinboro	Pittsburgh, PA
F	10	Paul Gakmar	6 ft 8 in (2.03 m)	185 lb (84 kg)	Jr	Hillsborough CC	Perth, Australia
G	11	Christian Moore	6 ft 1 in (1.85 m)	180 lb (82 kg)	So	Hargrave Military Academy	Virginia Beach, VA
F	12	Promise Opurum	6 ft 7 in (2.01 m)	215 lb (98 kg)	RS Fr	Woodstock Academy	New Rochelle, NY
F	15	Davide Poser	6 ft 4 in (1.93 m)	206 lb (93 kg)	Fr	Bernareggio	Veneto, Italy
F	21	Clarence Daniels (C)	6 ft 6 in (1.98 m)	210 lb (95 kg)	Sr	Lake Region State College	Brooklyn Park, MN
G/F	22	Alex Tavares	6 ft 3 in (1.91 m)	205 lb (93 kg)	Jr	Great Bay CC	Portsmouth, NH
F	23	Ridvan Tutic	6 ft 10 in (2.08 m)	242 lb (110 kg)	So	Gimnazija Novi Pazar	Novi Pazar, Serbia
F	33	Trey Woodyard	6 ft 6 in (1.98 m)	196 lb (89 kg)	Jr	Valparaiso	London, OH

Head coach

- Nathan Davis (Randolph–Macon)

Assistant coach(es)

- Jimmy Allen (Emory & Henry)
- Tyler Wilson (Manhattan)
- Luis Guzman (Temple)

Legend

- (C) Team captain
- (S) Suspended
- (I) Ineligible
- (W) Walk-on
- Injured
- Current redshirt

Roster
Last update: November 12, 2023

== Schedule and results ==
Date time, TV	Rank^{#}	Opponent^{#}	Result	Record	Site (attendance) city, state
Non-conference regular season
November 6, 2023*; 7:00 pm, ACCNX/ESPN+		at Syracuse	L 72–83	0–1	JMA Wireless Dome (19,130); Syracuse, NY
November 8, 2023*; 7:00 pm, AE.TV		Curry	W 115–38	1–1	Lundholm Gym (455); Durham, NH
November 14, 2023*; 7:00 pm, ESPN+		Brown	W 82–64	2–1	Lundholm Gym (578); Durham, NH
November 18, 2023*; 1:00 pm, ESPN+		at George Washington	L 67–79	2–2	Charles E. Smith Center (1,009); Washington, D.C.
November 21, 2023*; 7:00 pm, ESPN+		Marist	W 74–71	3–2	Lundholm Gym (462); Durham, NH
November 24, 2023*; 7:00 pm, ESPN+		at Fairfield	W 83–80	4–2	Leo D. Mahoney Arena (1,455); Fairfield, CT
November 27, 2023*; 7:00 pm, CBSSN		at No. 4 UConn	L 64–84	4–3	Harry A. Gampel Pavilion (10,299); Storrs, CT
November 30, 2023*; 7:00 pm, NEC Front Row		at Sacred Heart	W 90–84	5–3	William H. Pitt Center (664); Fairfield, CT
December 3, 2023*; 12:00 pm, ESPN+		Columbia	W 80–71	6–3	Lundholm Gym (421); Durham, NH
December 6, 2023*; 7:00 pm, ESPN+		at Dartmouth; Rivalry	L 64–76	6–4	Leede Arena (519); Hanover, NH
December 11, 2023*; 7:00 pm, ESPN+		Stonehill	W 75–62	7–4	Lundholm Gym (410); Durham, NH
December 21, 2023*; 6:00 pm, ESPN+		at Rhode Island	W 81–71	8–4	Ryan Center (3,300); Kingston, RI
December 31, 2023*; 1:00 pm, ESPN+		at Iowa State	L 70–85	8–5	Hilton Coliseum (14,267); Ames, IA
America East regular season
January 6, 2024; 12:00 pm, ESPN+		UMass Lowell	L 75–82	8–6 (0–1)	Lundholm Gym (823); Durham, NH
January 11, 2024; 6:00 pm, ESPN+		at Maine	W 79–74	9–6 (1–1)	Cross Insurance Center (612); Bangor, ME
January 13, 2024; 7:00 pm, ESPN+		Bryant	L 74–89	9–7 (1–2)	Lundholm Gym (652); Durham, NH
January 18, 2024; 7:00 pm, ESPN+		at NJIT	W 70–62	10–7 (2–2)	Wellness and Events Center (646); Newark, NJ
January 20, 2024; 1:00 pm, ESPN+		at UMBC	W 64–58	11–7 (3–2)	Chesapeake Employers Insurance Arena (468); Catonsville, MD
January 25, 2024; 7:00 pm, ESPN+		Binghamton	W 79–73 ^{OT}	12–7 (4–2)	Lundholm Gym (526); Durham, NH
January 27, 2024; 12:00 pm, ESPN+		Albany	L 79–86	12–8 (4–3)	Lundholm Gym (561); Durham, NH
February 3, 2024; 5:00 pm, ESPN+		at UMass Lowell	W 89–73	13–8 (5–3)	Tsongas Center (3,583); Lowell, MA
February 8, 2024; 7:00 pm, ESPN+		at Bryant	L 66–85	13–9 (5–4)	Chace Athletic Center (924); Smithfield, RI
February 10, 2024; 7:00 pm, ESPN+		Maine	W 60–57	14–9 (6–4)	Lundholm Gym (1,017); Durham, NH
February 15, 2024; 7:00 pm, ESPN+		at Vermont	L 54–70	14–10 (6–5)	Patrick Gym (2,375); Burlington, VT
February 22, 2024; 7:00 pm, ESPN+		NJIT	W 83–78	15–10 (7–5)	Lundholm Gym (462); Durham, NH
February 24, 2024; 1:00 pm, ESPN+		UMBC	L 68–86	15–11 (7–6)	Lundholm Gym (760); Durham, NH
February 29, 2024; 7:00 pm, ESPN+		at Albany	L 67–91	15–12 (7–7)	Broadview Center (1,505); Albany, NY
March 2, 2024; 2:00 pm, ESPN+		at Binghamton	L 74–87	15–13 (7–8)	Binghamton University Events Center (2,071); Vestal, NY
March 5, 2024; 7:00 pm, ESPN+		Vermont	L 64–68	15–14 (7–9)	Lundholm Gym (776); Durham, NH
America East tournament
March 9, 2024; 3:00 pm, ESPN+	(4)	(5) Binghamton; Quarterfinals	W 77–64	16–14	Lundholm Gym (974); Durham, NH
March 12, 2024; 5:00 pm, ESPN+	(4)	at (1) Vermont; Semifinals	L 59–66	16–15	Patrick Gym (2,487); Burlington, VT
*Non-conference game. ^{#}Rankings from AP Poll. (#) Tournament seedings in parentheses. All times are in Eastern.
