= 2023–24 Hofstra Pride men's basketball team =

American college basketball season

2023–24 Hofstra Pride men's basketball

Gulf Coast Showcase champions
- Conference: Coastal Athletic Association
- Record: 20–13 (12–6 CAA)
- Head coach: Speedy Claxton (3rd season)
- Assistant coaches: Mike DePaoli; Serge Clement; Tom Parrotta
- Home arena: Mack Sports Complex

2023–24 CAA men's basketball standings
	Conf.				Overall
Team	W		L	PCT	W		L	PCT
Charleston †	15	–	3	.833	27	–	8	.771
Drexel	13	–	5	.722	20	–	12	.625
Hofstra	12	–	6	.667	20	–	13	.606
UNC Wilmington	12	–	6	.667	21	–	10	.677
Towson	11	–	7	.611	20	–	14	.588
Delaware	10	–	8	.556	19	–	14	.576
Stony Brook	10	–	8	.556	20	–	15	.571
Monmouth	10	–	8	.556	18	–	15	.545
Campbell	8	–	10	.444	14	–	18	.438
Northeastern	7	–	11	.389	12	–	20	.375
Elon	6	–	12	.333	13	–	19	.406
North Carolina A&T	5	–	13	.278	7	–	25	.219
William & Mary	4	–	14	.222	10	–	23	.303
Hampton	3	–	15	.167	9	–	24	.273
† 2024 CAA tournament winner

The 2023–24 Hofstra Pride men's basketball team represented Hofstra University during the 2023–24 NCAA Division I men's basketball season. The Pride, led by third-year head coach Speedy Claxton, played their home games at the Mack Sports Complex in Hempstead, New York, as members of the Coastal Athletic Association.

== Previous season ==
The Pride finished the 2022–23 season 25–10, 16–2 in CAA play to finish as CAA regular season co–champions, alongside Charleston. Due to tiebreakers, they received the #1 seed in the CAA tournament, where they defeated #8 seed William & Mary in the quarterfinals, before being upset by #4 seed UNC Wilmington in the semifinals. As a regular season conference champion who failed to win their conference tournament, they received an automatic bid to the NIT, where, in the first round, they would upset #1 seed Rutgers in overtime, before falling to Cincinnati in the second round.

== Roster ==
2023–24 Hofstra Pride men's basketball team
Players
Coaches

Pos.	#	Name	Height	Weight	Year	Previous school	Hometown
G	0	KiJan Robinson	6 ft 3 in (1.91 m)	170 lb (77 kg)	Fr	Wekiva High School	Apopka, Florida
G	1	Darlinstone Dubar	6 ft 8 in (2.03 m)	211 lb (96 kg)	Jr	Iowa State	Charlotte, North Carolina
G	2	Bryce Washington	6 ft 4 in (1.93 m)	187 lb (85 kg)	GS	Penn	Southfield, Michigan
G	3	Khalil Farmer	6 ft 4 in (1.93 m)	188 lb (85 kg)	RS Fr	Roman Catholic High School	Philadelphia, Pennsylvania
F	4	Myles Wilmoth	6 ft 9 in (2.06 m)	215 lb (98 kg)	RS Sr	Butler	Chestnut Ridge, New York
G	5	Jaquan Carlos	6 ft 0 in (1.83 m)	170 lb (77 kg)	Jr	Thomas Jefferson High School	Brooklyn, New York
F	11	Jacco Fritz	6 ft 10 in (2.08 m)	215 lb (98 kg)	GS	Canisius	Tiel, Netherlands
G	12	Griffin Barrouk	6 ft 5 in (1.96 m)	204 lb (93 kg)	RS So	Bayard Rustin High School	Glen Mills, Pennsylvania
G	14	Aiden Best	5 ft 9 in (1.75 m)	150 lb (68 kg)	So	Lawrence Woodmere Academy	Hempstead, New York
G	15	Jayden Henriquez	6 ft 1 in (1.85 m)	180 lb (82 kg)	Fr	East Meadow High School	East Meadow, New York
G	23	Tyler Thomas	6 ft 3 in (1.91 m)	200 lb (91 kg)	GS	Sacred Heart	New Haven, Connecticut
G	24	Eric Parnell	6 ft 3 in (1.91 m)	170 lb (77 kg)	So	Eastern Florida State	Melbourne, Florida
G	25	German Plotnikov	6 ft 6 in (1.98 m)	197 lb (89 kg)	Jr	North Platte Community College	Minsk, Belarus
F	30	Silas Sunday	7 ft 0 in (2.13 m)	280 lb (127 kg)	So	Iona	Lucan, Ireland
F	33	Christian Tomasco	6 ft 9 in (2.06 m)	205 lb (93 kg)	RS So	Archbishop Ryan High School	Moorestown, New Jersey

Head coach

- Speedy Claxton (Hofstra)

Assistant coach(es)

- Mike DePaoli (Saint Rose)
- Serge Clement (SUNY Potsdam)
- Tom Parrotta (Fordham)

Legend

- (C) Team captain
- (S) Suspended
- (I) Ineligible
- (W) Walk-on
- Injured
- Current redshirt

Roster
Last update: November 21, 2023

== Schedule and results ==
Date time, TV	Rank^{#}	Opponent^{#}	Result	Record	Site (attendance) city, state
Non-conference regular season
November 6, 2023*; 11:30 am, FloHoops		St. Joseph's–Long Island	W 101–48	1–0	Mack Sports Complex (2,147); Hempstead, NY
November 10, 2023*; 7:00 pm, FloHoops		Princeton	L 67–74	1–1	Mack Sports Complex (3,217); Hempstead, NY
November 14, 2023*; 7:00 pm, ESPN+		at George Washington	L 60–71	1–2	Charles E. Smith Center (1,169); Washington, D.C.
November 20, 2023*; 7:30 pm, FloHoops		vs. Buffalo; Gulf Coast Showcase first round	W 102–68	2–2	Hertz Arena (314); Estero, FL
November 21, 2023*; 7:30 pm, FloHoops		vs. Wright State; Gulf Coast Showcase semifinals	W 85–76	3–2	Hertz Arena (342); Estero, FL
November 22, 2023*; 7:30 pm, FloHoops		vs. High Point; Gulf Coast Showcase championship	W 97–92 ^{OT}	4–2	Hertz Arena (413); Estero, FL
November 30, 2023*; 7:00 pm, FloHoops/MSG2		South Florida	W 82–63	5–2	Mack Sports Complex (1,758); Hempstead, NY
December 6, 2023*; 7:00 pm, ESPN+		at Iona	W 62–57	6–2	Hynes Athletics Center (1,744); New Rochelle, NY
December 9, 2023*; 3:00 pm, ESPN+		at Saint Louis	L 68–71	6–3	Chaifetz Arena (5,127); St. Louis, MO
December 12, 2023*; 7:00 pm, ESPN2		at No. 21 Duke	L 68–89	6–4	Cameron Indoor Stadium (9,314); Durham, NC
December 16, 2023*; 2:00 pm, FloHoops		Norfolk State	W 74–58	7–4	Mack Sports Complex (1,969); Hempstead, NY
December 21, 2023*; 10:00 pm		at UNLV	L 56–74	7–5	Thomas & Mack Center (5,065); Paradise, NV
December 30, 2023*; 12:00 pm, FS1		at St. John's	L 79–84	7–6	UBS Arena (7,486); Elmont, NY
CAA regular season
January 4, 2024; 7:00 pm, FloHoops/MSG2		Charleston	L 61–73	7–7 (0–1)	Mack Sports Complex (1,412); Hempstead, NY
January 6, 2024; 2:00 pm, FloHoops/MSG		Delaware	W 76–71	8–7 (1–1)	Mack Sports Complex (2,027); Hempstead, NY
January 11, 2024; 7:00 pm, CBSSN		at Northeastern	L 68–71	8–8 (1–2)	Matthews Arena (972); Boston, MA
January 13, 2024; 2:00 pm, FloHoops		at Campbell	L 68–69	8–9 (1–3)	Gore Arena (1,122); Buies Creek, NC
January 18, 2024; 7:00 pm, FloHoops		Hampton	W 86–77	9–9 (2–3)	Mack Sports Complex (1,244); Hempstead, NY
January 22, 2024; 9:00 pm, CBSSN		at Stony Brook	W 80–74	10–9 (3–3)	Island Federal Arena (3,027); Stony Brook, NY
January 25, 2024; 7:00 pm, FloHoops		William & Mary	W 64–55	11–9 (4–3)	Mack Sports Complex (1,376); Hempstead, NY
January 27, 2024; 2:00 pm, FloHoops		at Monmouth	L 78–81	11–10 (4–4)	OceanFirst Bank Center (2,276); West Long Branch, NJ
February 1, 2024; 7:00 pm, FloHoops/MSGSN		Stony Brook	W 72–71	12–10 (5–4)	Mack Sports Complex (2,062); Hempstead, NY
February 3, 2024; 6:00 pm, CBSSN		Towson	W 59–56	13–10 (6–4)	Mack Sports Complex (3,743); Hempstead, NY
February 8, 2024; 7:00 pm, FloHoops		at Hampton	W 63–59	14–10 (7–4)	Hampton Convocation Center (1,004); Hampton, VA
February 10, 2024; 2:00 pm, FloHoops		at North Carolina A&T	W 81–49	15–10 (8–4)	Corbett Sports Center (1,054); Greensboro, NC
February 15, 2024; 7:00 pm, FloHoops		at Drexel	L 77–79	15–11 (8–5)	Daskalakis Athletic Center (1,678); Philadelphia, PA
February 17, 2024; 2:00 pm, FloHoops/MSG		Northeastern	W 82–62	16–11 (9–5)	Mack Sports Complex (2,122); Hempstead, NY
February 22, 2024; 7:00 pm, CBSSN		Drexel	W 69–57	17–11 (10–5)	Mack Sports Complex (2,674); Hempstead, NY
February 24, 2024; 7:00 pm, FloHoops/MSG		Elon	W 87–64	18–11 (11–5)	Mack Sports Complex (2,613); Hempstead, NY
February 29, 2024; 7:00 pm, FloHoops		at UNC Wilmington	W 69–58	19–11 (12–5)	Trask Coliseum (4,937); Wilmington, NC
March 2, 2024; 2:00 pm, FloHoops		at Charleston	L 76–87	19–12 (12–6)	TD Arena (5,127); Charleston, SC
CAA Tournament
March 10, 2024; 8:30 pm, FloHoops	(3)	vs. (6) Delaware; Quarterfinals	W 73–58	20–12	Entertainment and Sports Arena (1,688); Washington, D.C.
March 11, 2024; 8:30 pm, CBSSN	(3)	vs. (7) Stony Brook; Semifinals	L 59–63	20–13	Entertainment and Sports Arena (1,785); Washington, D.C.
*Non-conference game. ^{#}Rankings from AP Poll. (#) Tournament seedings in parentheses. All times are in Eastern.
