= 2023–24 NJIT Highlanders men's basketball team =

American college basketball season

2023–24 NJIT Highlanders men's basketball
- Conference: America East Conference
- Record: 7–21 (3–13 America East)
- Head coach: Grant Billmeier (1st season)
- Assistant coaches: RaShawn Stores; Pete Lappas; Thomas Messinger; Mike Hamlin
- Home arena: Wellness and Events Center

2023–24 America East Conference men's basketball standings
	Conf.				Overall
Team	W		L	PCT	W		L	PCT
Vermont †	15	–	1	.938	28	–	7	.800
UMass Lowell	11	–	5	.688	22	–	10	.688
Bryant	11	–	5	.688	20	–	13	.606
New Hampshire	7	–	9	.438	16	–	15	.516
Binghamton	7	–	9	.438	15	–	15	.500
Maine	7	–	9	.438	15	–	17	.469
UMBC	6	–	10	.375	11	–	21	.344
Albany	5	–	11	.313	13	–	19	.406
NJIT	3	–	13	.188	7	–	21	.250
† 2024 AmEast tournament winner

The 2023–24 NJIT Highlanders men's basketball team represented the New Jersey Institute of Technology (NJIT) during the 2023–24 NCAA Division I men's basketball season. The Highlanders were led by first-year head coach Grant Billmeier and played their home games at the Wellness and Events Center in Newark, New Jersey as third-year members of the America East Conference. They finished the season 7–21, 3–13 in America East play, to finish in ninth (last) place. They failed to qualify for the America East tournament.

== Previous season ==
The Highlanders finished the 2022–23 season 7–23, 4–12 in America East play, to finish in eighth place. They lost in the quarterfinals of the America East tournament to Vermont.

On March 6, 2023, it was announced that head coach Brian Kennedy had resigned as head coach, after seven years at the helm. A month later on April 6, Maryland assistant coach Grant Billmeier was named as the Highlanders' next head coach.

== Roster ==
2023–24 NJIT Highlanders men's basketball team
Players
Coaches

Pos.	#	Name	Height	Weight	Year	Previous school	Hometown
G	0	Sebastian Robinson	6 ft 1 in (1.85 m)	190 lb (86 kg)	Fr	Roselle Catholic High School	Montclair, NJ
G	1	Jalen Robinson	5 ft 9 in (1.75 m)	170 lb (77 kg)	Fr	Columbia High School	South Orange, NJ
G	2	Justin Anderson	6 ft 3 in (1.91 m)	170 lb (77 kg)	GS	Bloomsburg	Philadelphia, PA
G	3	Isaac Hester	5 ft 11 in (1.8 m)	180 lb (82 kg)	Fr	Ranney School	Ocean Township, NJ
G	4	Adam Hess	6 ft 4 in (1.93 m)	205 lb (93 kg)	GS	Eastern New Mexico	Westlake Village, CA
G	5	Jake Goldberg	6 ft 4 in (1.93 m)	190 lb (86 kg)	Fr	IMG Academy	Pasadena, CA
G	7	Cameron Piggee	6 ft 0 in (1.83 m)	180 lb (82 kg)	Fr	Rutgers Prep	North Brunswick, NJ
F	8	Jeffrey Akintolu	6 ft 7 in (2.01 m)	210 lb (95 kg)	Fr	Avon Old Farms	Welling, England
F	10	Eyal Nankin	6 ft 7 in (2.01 m)	210 lb (95 kg)	Jr	Emek Harod	Ra'anana, Israel
F	11	Daniel Schreier	6 ft 9 in (2.06 m)	225 lb (102 kg)	GS	Manhattan	Santa Monica, CA
F	12	JJ Chaikovsky	6 ft 7 in (2.01 m)	205 lb (93 kg)	Fr	El Segundo High School	Manhattan Beach, CA
G	20	Tariq Francis	6 ft 0 in (1.83 m)	180 lb (82 kg)	Fr	First Love Christian Academy	Pittsburgh, PA
F	22	Levi Lawal	6 ft 7 in (2.01 m)	195 lb (88 kg)	Fr	Mt. Zion Prep	Laurel, MD
G	24	Mekhi Gray	6 ft 4 in (1.93 m)	190 lb (86 kg)	Sr	Putnam Science Academy	Montrose, NY
G	30	Elijah Buchanan	6 ft 5 in (1.96 m)	190 lb (86 kg)	GS	Manhattan	The Bronx, NY
F	33	Kjell de Graaf	6 ft 10 in (2.08 m)	230 lb (104 kg)	GS	Canarias Basketball Academy	Rotterdam, Netherlands

Head coach

- Grant Billmeier (Seton Hall)

Assistant coach(es)

- RaShawn Stores (Manhattan)
- Pete Lappas (Boston College)
- Thomas Messinger (Emerson)

Legend

- (C) Team captain
- (S) Suspended
- (I) Ineligible
- (W) Walk-on
- Injured
- Current redshirt

Roster
Last update: November 12, 2023

== Schedule and results ==
Date time, TV	Rank^{#}	Opponent^{#}	Result	Record	Site (attendance) city, state
Exhibition
October 28, 2023*; 4:00 p.m.		Seton Hall; Charity Exhibition	L 60–68	–	Wellness and Events Center (1,012); Newark, NJ
Non-conference regular season
November 6, 2023*; 7:00 p.m., ACCNX/ESPN+		at No. 13 Miami (FL)	L 60–101	0–1	Watsco Center (6,861); Coral Gables, FL
November 11, 2023*; 4:00 p.m., ESPN+		Saint Peter's	L 48–75	0–2	Wellness and Events Center (616); Newark, NJ
November 16, 2023*; 7:00 p.m., ESPN+		at American	L 73–87	0–3	Bender Arena (909); Washington, D.C.
November 20, 2023*; 7:00 p.m., ESPN+		Delaware State	W 81–72	1–3	Wellness and Events Center (383); Newark, NJ
November 25, 2023*; 1:00 p.m., NEC Front Row		at Wagner	L 51–64	1–4	Spiro Sports Center (558); Staten Island, NY
November 29, 2023*; 7:00 p.m., ESPN+		at George Mason	L 68–86	1–5	EagleBank Arena (2,443); Fairfax, VA
December 2, 2023*; 3:30 p.m., ESPN+		Fairleigh Dickinson	L 68–71	1–6	Wellness and Events Center; Newark, NJ
December 6, 2023*; 7:00 p.m., ESPN+		at Fordham	W 80–77	2–6	Rose Hill Gymnasium (1,503); The Bronx, NY
December 9, 2023*; 8:00 p.m., ACCN		at Wake Forest	L 59–83	2–7	LJVM Coliseum (7,224); Winston-Salem, NC
December 16, 2023*; 1:00 p.m., ESPN+		at Niagara	L 81–89	2–8	Gallagher Center (362); Lewiston, NY
December 22, 2023*; 1:00 p.m., ESPN+		Medgar Evers	W 127–51	3–8	Wellness and Events Center (313); Newark, NJ
December 31, 2023*; 4:30 p.m., ESPN+		Morgan State	W 69–53	4–8	Wellness and Events Center (363); Newark, NJ
America East regular season
January 6, 2024; 3:30 p.m., ESPN+		Albany	L 73–79	4–9 (0–1)	Wellness and Events Center (323); Newark, NJ
January 11, 2024; 6:30 p.m., ESPN+		at UMass Lowell	L 62–70	4–10 (0–2)	Costello Athletic Center (373); Lowell, MA
January 13, 2024; 2:00 p.m., ESPN+		at Vermont	L 55–76	4–11 (0–3)	Patrick Gym (2,434); Burlington, VT
January 18, 2024; 7:00 p.m., ESPN+		New Hampshire	L 62–70	4–12 (0–4)	Wellness and Events Center (646); Newark, NJ
January 20, 2024; 2:00 p.m., ESPN+		Maine	L 64–70	4–13 (0–5)	Wellness and Events Center (655); Newark, NJ
January 25, 2024; 7:00 p.m., ESPN+		Bryant	L 55–70	4–14 (0–6)	Wellness and Events Center (444); Newark, NJ
January 27, 2024; 7:00 p.m., ESPN+		at UMBC	W 75–74	5–14 (1–6)	Chesapeake Employers Insurance Arena (1,685); Catonsville, MD
February 1, 2024; 6:07 p.m., ESPN+		at Binghamton	L 66–75	5–15 (1–7)	Binghamton University Events Center (1,898); Vestal, NY
February 8, 2024; 7:00 p.m., ESPN+		Vermont	W 63–61	6–15 (2–7)	Wellness and Events Center (474); Newark, NJ
February 10, 2024; 4:00 p.m., ESPN+		UMass Lowell	W 71–64	7–15 (3–7)	Wellness and Events Center (471); Newark, NJ
February 15, 2024; 7:00 p.m., ESPN+		at Albany	L 58–83	7–16 (3–8)	Broadview Center (1,453); Albany, NY
February 17, 2024; 3:30 p.m., ESPN+		Binghamton	L 55–69	7–17 (3–9)	Wellness and Events Center (472); Newark, NJ
February 22, 2024; 7:00 p.m., ESPN+		at New Hampshire	L 78–83	7–18 (3–10)	Lundholm Gym (462); Durham, NH
February 24, 2024; 2:00 p.m., ESPN+		at Maine	L 58–68	7–19 (3–11)	Memorial Gymnasium (689); Orono, ME
February 29, 2024; 7:00 p.m., ESPN+		UMBC	L 60–79	7–20 (3–12)	Wellness and Events Center (515); Newark, NJ
March 2, 2024; 4:00 p.m., ESPN+		at Bryant	L 82–101	7–21 (3–13)	Chace Athletic Center (777); Smithfield, RI
*Non-conference game. ^{#}Rankings from AP poll. (#) Tournament seedings in parentheses. All times are in Eastern.
