= 2023–24 UMass Lowell River Hawks men's basketball team =

American college basketball season

2023–24 UMass Lowell River Hawks men's basketball
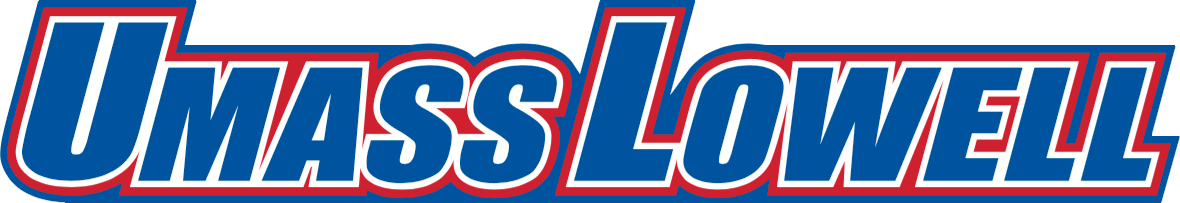
- Conference: America East Conference
- Record: 22–10 (11–5 America East)
- Head coach: Pat Duquette (11th season)
- Assistant coaches: Jon Iati; Matt Graves; Ryan Herrion
- Home arena: Costello Athletic Center

2023–24 America East Conference men's basketball standings
	Conf.				Overall
Team	W		L	PCT	W		L	PCT
Vermont †	15	–	1	.938	28	–	7	.800
UMass Lowell	11	–	5	.688	22	–	10	.688
Bryant	11	–	5	.688	20	–	13	.606
New Hampshire	7	–	9	.438	16	–	15	.516
Binghamton	7	–	9	.438	15	–	15	.500
Maine	7	–	9	.438	15	–	17	.469
UMBC	6	–	10	.375	11	–	21	.344
Albany	5	–	11	.313	13	–	19	.406
NJIT	3	–	13	.188	7	–	21	.250
† 2024 AmEast tournament winner

The 2023–24 UMass Lowell River Hawks men's basketball team represented the University of Massachusetts Lowell during the 2023–24 NCAA Division I men's basketball season. They played their home games at the Costello Athletic Center in Lowell, Massachusetts, with two games being played at the Tsongas Center, and were led by 11th-year head coach Pat Duquette.

The River Hawks finished the season with a 22–10, including an 11–5 mark in America East play, to finish in a tie for second place. They defeated UMBC and Bryant, before falling to top-seeded Vermont in the America East tournament championship game.

== Previous season ==
The River Hawks finished the 2022–23 season 26–8, 11–5 in America East play, to finish in second place. They defeated Maine and New Hampshire, before losing to Vermont in the championship game of the America East tournament.

== Roster ==
2023–24 UMass Lowell River Hawks men's basketball team
Players
Coaches

Pos.	#	Name	Height	Weight	Year	Previous school	Hometown
F	0	Keenan Bey	6 ft 7 in (2.01 m)	198 lb (90 kg)	Fr	Bishop Gorman HS	Las Vegas, NV
G	1	Brayden O'Connor	6 ft 4 in (1.93 m)	207 lb (94 kg)	So	Notre Dame HS	Ottawa, ON
G	2	Ayinde Hikim	5 ft 11 in (1.8 m)	180 lb (82 kg)	Sr	La Salle	Washington, D.C.
G	3	Quinton Mincey	6 ft 7 in (2.01 m)	195 lb (88 kg)	Sr	Mount St. Mary's	Upper Marlboro, MD
G	4	Yuri Covington	6 ft 1 in (1.85 m)	192 lb (87 kg)	Sr	William & Mary	Wilkes-Barre, PA
G	5	Anthony Maxwell	6 ft 1 in (1.85 m)	180 lb (82 kg)	Fr	Dynastie Prep	Montreal, QC
F	10	Max Brooks	6 ft 7 in (2.01 m)	205 lb (93 kg)	Sr	St. Charles HS	Waldorf, MD
G	11	Andres Fulgencio	6 ft 4 in (1.93 m)	205 lb (93 kg)	Jr	Bloomfield	Englewood, NJ
F	12	Abdoul Karim Coulibaly	6 ft 9 in (2.06 m)	235 lb (107 kg)	Sr	St. Bonaventure	Bamako, Mali
G	14	Anthony Blunt	6 ft 2 in (1.88 m)	185 lb (84 kg)	Sr	St. Vincent Pallotti HS	Crownsville, MD
G	20	Jordan Thompson	6 ft 1 in (1.85 m)	170 lb (77 kg)	Jr	Southmoore HS	Oklahoma City, OK
F	23	Cam III Morris	6 ft 8 in (2.03 m)	205 lb (93 kg)	Jr	IMG Academy	Alexander City, AL
F	24	Xzavier Lino	6 ft 6 in (1.98 m)	200 lb (91 kg)	Jr	Whitman College	Phoenix, AZ
F	33	Ephraim Acquah	6 ft 7 in (2.01 m)	192 lb (87 kg)	Jr	Williamsport HS	Hagerstown, MD

Head coach

- Pat Duquette (Williams)

Assistant coach(es)

- Jon Iati (Albany)
- Matt Graves (Belmont Abbey)
- Ryan Herrion (New Hampshire)

Legend

- (C) Team captain
- (S) Suspended
- (I) Ineligible
- (W) Walk-on
- Injured
- Current redshirt

Roster
Last update: November 11, 2023

== Schedule and results ==
Date time, TV	Rank^{#}	Opponent^{#}	Result	Record	Site (attendance) city, state
Non-conference regular season
November 6, 2023*; 6:00 p.m., ESPN+		Rivier	W 96–51	1–0	Costello Athletic Center (719); Lowell, MA
November 10, 2023*; 6:00 p.m., ESPN+		at Dartmouth	W 81–48	2–0	Leede Arena (637); Hanover, NH
November 14, 2023*; 7:30 p.m., ESPN+/ACCNX		at Georgia Tech	W 74–71	3–0	McCamish Pavilion (3,778); Atlanta, GA
November 16, 2023*; 9:00 p.m., P12N		at Arizona State	L 69–71	3–1	Desert Financial Arena (6,857); Tempe, AZ
November 20, 2023*; 7:00 p.m., ESPN+		at Saint Peter's	W 69–61	4–1	Run Baby Run Arena (745); Jersey City, NJ
November 29, 2023*; 4:30 p.m.		at Stonehill	W 80–74	5–1	Merkert Gymnasium (759); Easton, MA
December 2, 2023*; 7:00 p.m., ESPN+		at Merrimack	L 68–74	5–2	Hammel Court (2,347); North Andover, MA
December 5, 2023*; 6:00 p.m., ESPN+		Fisher	W 117–69	6–2	Costello Athletic Center (434); Lowell, MA
December 9, 2023*; 12:00 p.m., ESPN+		at UMass	L 77–91	6–3	Mullins Center (3,028); Amherst, MA
December 12, 2023*; 6:00 p.m., ESPN+		LIU	W 78–65	7–3	Costello Athletic Center (475); Lowell, MA
December 16, 2023*; 5:00 p.m., ESPN+		Central Connecticut	L 54–57	7–4	Tsongas Center (1,379); Lowell, MA
December 22, 2023*; 12:00 p.m., ESPN+		at Boston University	W 71–63	8–4	Case Gym (450); Boston, MA
December 31, 2023*; 1:00 p.m., ESPN+		Emerson	W 116–48	9–4	Costello Athletic Center (455); Lowell, MA
America East regular season
January 6, 2024; 12:00 p.m., ESPN+		at New Hampshire	W 82–75	10–4 (1–0)	Lundholm Gym (823); Durham, NH
January 11, 2024; 6:30 p.m., ESPN+		NJIT	W 70–62	11–4 (2–0)	Costello Athletic Center (373); Lowell, MA
January 13, 2024; 2:00 p.m., ESPN+		UMBC	W 86–82	12–4 (3–0)	Costello Athletic Center (626); Lowell, MA
January 18, 2024; 7:00 p.m., ESPN+		at Albany	W 97–76	13–4 (4–0)	Broadview Center (2,004); Albany, NY
January 20, 2024; 2:00 p.m., ESPN+		at Binghamton	W 80–60	14–4 (5–0)	Binghamton University Events Center (2,028); Vestal, NY
January 25, 2024; 6:30 p.m., ESPN+		Vermont	L 65–72 ^{OT}	14–5 (5–1)	Costello Athletic Center (957); Lowell, MA
February 1, 2024; 6:30 p.m., ESPN+		Maine	W 76–62	15–5 (6–1)	Costello Athletic Center (768); Lowell, MA
February 3, 2024; 5:00 p.m., ESPN+		New Hampshire	L 73–89	15–6 (6–2)	Tsongas Center (3,583); Lowell, MA
February 8, 2024; 7:00 p.m., ESPN+		at UMBC	W 93–80	16–6 (7–2)	Chesapeake Employers Insurance Arena (1,163); Catonsville, MD
February 10, 2024; 4:00 p.m., ESPN+		at NJIT	L 64–71	16–7 (7–3)	Wellness and Events Center (471); Newark, NJ
February 17, 2024; 4:00 p.m., ESPN+		at Bryant	W 86–77	17–7 (8–3)	Chace Athletic Center (1,022); Smithfield, RI
February 22, 2024; 6:30 p.m., ESPN+		Binghamton	W 87–80	18–7 (9–3)	Costello Athletic Center (625); Lowell, MA
February 24, 2024; 1:00 p.m., ESPN+		Albany	W 104–95	19–7 (10–3)	Costello Athletic Center (702); Lowell, MA
February 29, 2024; 6:30 p.m., ESPN+		Bryant	W 89–67	20–7 (11–3)	Costello Athletic Center (703); Lowell, MA
March 2, 2024; 4:30 p.m., ESPN+		at Vermont	L 62–74	20–8 (11–4)	Patrick Gym (3,015); Burlington, VT
March 5, 2024; 6:00 p.m., ESPN+		at Maine	L 65–71	20–9 (11–5)	Memorial Gymnasium (647); Orono, ME
America East tournament
March 9, 2024; 3:00 p.m., ESPN+	(2)	(7) UMBC; Quarterfinals	W 94–89 ^{OT}	21–9	Costello Athletic Center (684); Lowell, MA
March 12, 2024; 5:00 p.m., ESPN+	(2)	(3) Bryant; Semifinals	W 77–70	22–9	Costello Athletic Center (957); Lowell, MA
March 16, 2024; 11:00 a.m., ESPN2	(2)	at (1) Vermont; Championship	L 61–66	22–10	Patrick Gym (3,000); Burlington, VT
*Non-conference game. ^{#}Rankings from AP poll. (#) Tournament seedings in parentheses. All times are in Eastern.
