= 2023–24 Drexel Dragons men's basketball team =

American college basketball team

2023–24 Drexel Dragons men's basketball
- Conference: Coastal Athletic Association
- Record: 20–12 (13–5 CAA)
- Head coach: Zach Spiker (8th season)
- Assistant coaches: Paul Fortier (8th season); Will Chavis (3rd season); Frantz Massenat (1st season)
- MVP: Amari Williams
- Home arena: Daskalakis Athletic Center

2023–24 CAA men's basketball standings
| | Conf. | | | | Overall |
| Team | W | | L | PCT | W | | L | PCT |
|---|---|---|---|---|---|---|---|---|
| Charleston † | 15 | – | 3 | .833 | 27 | – | 8 | .771 |
| Drexel | 13 | – | 5 | .722 | 20 | – | 12 | .625 |
| Hofstra | 12 | – | 6 | .667 | 20 | – | 13 | .606 |
| UNC Wilmington | 12 | – | 6 | .667 | 21 | – | 10 | .677 |
| Towson | 11 | – | 7 | .611 | 20 | – | 14 | .588 |
| Delaware | 10 | – | 8 | .556 | 19 | – | 14 | .576 |
| Stony Brook | 10 | – | 8 | .556 | 20 | – | 15 | .571 |
| Monmouth | 10 | – | 8 | .556 | 18 | – | 15 | .545 |
| Campbell | 8 | – | 10 | .444 | 14 | – | 18 | .438 |
| Northeastern | 7 | – | 11 | .389 | 12 | – | 20 | .375 |
| Elon | 6 | – | 12 | .333 | 13 | – | 19 | .406 |
| North Carolina A&T | 5 | – | 13 | .278 | 7 | – | 25 | .219 |
| William & Mary | 4 | – | 14 | .222 | 10 | – | 23 | .303 |
| Hampton | 3 | – | 15 | .167 | 9 | – | 24 | .273 |
† 2024 CAA tournament winner

The 2023–24 Drexel Dragons men's basketball team represented Drexel University during the 2023–24 NCAA Division I men's basketball season. The Dragons, led by eighth-year head coach Zach Spiker, played their home games at the Daskalakis Athletic Center in Philadelphia, Pennsylvania as members of the Coastal Athletic Association.

== Previous season ==
The Dragons finished the 2022–23 season 17–15, 10–8 in CAA play to finish in fifth place. They lost to UNC Wilmington in the CAA tournament quarterfinals.

== Offseason ==
On August 23, 2023, Drexel announced that the team hired former Dragons player Frantz Massenat as an assistant coach.

=== Departures ===
| Name | Number | Pos. | Height | Weight | Year | Hometown | Notes |
|---|---|---|---|---|---|---|---|
| Coletrane Washington | 0 | G | 6'4" | 190 | RS Senior | Sewickley, PA | Graduated |
| Terrence Butler Jr. | 24 | F | 6'7" | 235 | RS Sophomore | Upper Marlboro, MD | Died during offseason (suicide) |

=== Incoming transfers ===
College recruiting information
| Name | Hometown | School | Height | Weight | Commit date |
|---|---|---|---|---|---|
| Lucas Monroe; G | Gaithersburg, MD | Odessa | 6 ft 6 in (1.98 m) | 200 lb (91 kg) | Apr 24, 2023 |
| Lucas Monroe; G | Recruit ratings: No ratings found | | | | |
Overall recruit ranking:
Note: In many cases, Scout, Rivals, 247Sports, On3, and ESPN may conflict in their listings of height and weight.; In these cases, the average was taken. ESPN grades are on a 100-point scale.; Sources: "Drexel 2023 Basketball Commitments". Rivals.; "Drexel Dragons". ESPN.; "2023 Team Ranking". Rivals.; "Drexel 2023 Basketball Commits". 247Sports.

=== Recruiting class ===
==== 2023 recruiting class ====
College recruiting information
| Name | Hometown | School | Height | Weight | Commit date |
|---|---|---|---|---|---|
| Horace Simmons; SF | Wyndmoor, PA | La Salle College High School | 6 ft 6 in (1.98 m) | 180 lb (82 kg) | Aug 25, 2022 |
| Horace Simmons; SF | Recruit ratings: 247Sports: ESPN: (77) | | | | |
Overall recruit ranking:
Note: In many cases, Scout, Rivals, 247Sports, On3, and ESPN may conflict in their listings of height and weight.; In these cases, the average was taken. ESPN grades are on a 100-point scale.; Sources: "Drexel 2023 Basketball Commitments". Rivals.; "Drexel Dragons". ESPN.; "2023 Team Ranking". Rivals.; "Drexel 2023 Basketball Commits". 247Sports.

==== 2024 recruiting class ====
College recruiting information (2024)
| Name | Hometown | School | Height | Weight | Commit date |
|---|---|---|---|---|---|
| Josh Reed; PG | Philadelphia, PA | Archbishop Wood High School | 6 ft 3 in (1.91 m) | N/A | Sep 13, 2023 |
| Josh Reed; PG | Recruit ratings: No ratings found | | | | |
| Clemson Edomwonyin; PF | Elche, Spain | South Kent School | 6 ft 9 in (2.06 m) | N/A | Jan 26, 2024 |
| Clemson Edomwonyin; PF | Recruit ratings: No ratings found | | | | |
Overall recruit ranking:
Note: In many cases, Scout, Rivals, 247Sports, On3, and ESPN may conflict in their listings of height and weight.; In these cases, the average was taken. ESPN grades are on a 100-point scale.; Sources: "Drexel 2024 Basketball Commitments". Rivals.; "Drexel Dragons". ESPN.; "2024 Team Ranking". Rivals.; "Drexel 2024 Basketball Commits". 247Sports.

== Roster ==
2023–24 Drexel Dragons men's basketball team
Players
Coaches

| Pos. | # | Name | Height | Weight | Year | Previous school | Hometown |
|---|---|---|---|---|---|---|---|
| F | 0 | Horace Simmons (redshirt) | 6 ft 6 in (1.98 m) | 200 lb (91 kg) | Fr | La Salle College HS | Glenside, PA |
| G/F | 1 | Lamar Oden Jr | 6 ft 6 in (1.98 m) | 215 lb (98 kg) | Sr | Greenforest McCalep | Douglasville, GA |
| G | 2 | Lucas Monroe | 6 ft 6 in (1.98 m) | 205 lb (93 kg) | RS Sr | Abington Senior HS/Penn | Abington, PA |
| G | 3 | Jamie Bergens | 6 ft 2 in (1.88 m) | 190 lb (86 kg) | Sr | West Nottingham/Oral Roberts | Almere, Netherlands |
| G | 4 | Shane Blakeney | 6 ft 5 in (1.96 m) | 190 lb (86 kg) | RS Fr | Legion Collegiate Academy | Rock Hill, SC |
| G | 5 | Kobe Magee | 6 ft 6 in (1.98 m) | 190 lb (86 kg) | So | Executive Education Academy | Allentown, PA |
| G | 11 | Justin Moore | 6 ft 3 in (1.91 m) | 187 lb (85 kg) | So | Archbishop Wood | Philadelphia, PA |
| G | 12 | Dean Wang (W) | 6 ft 1 in (1.85 m) | 190 lb (86 kg) | Sr | Friends Select School | Philadelphia, PA |
| F | 13 | Garfield Turner | 6 ft 8 in (2.03 m) | 230 lb (104 kg) | Jr | Mt. Zion Prep/Odessa | Gaithersburg, MD |
| F | 14 | Luke House | 6 ft 4 in (1.93 m) | 215 lb (98 kg) | | Archbishop John Carroll HS/Cal (PA) | Norristown, PA |
| F | 15 | Cole Hargrove | 6 ft 8 in (2.03 m) | 230 lb (104 kg) | So | Methacton High School | Norristown, PA |
| G | 20 | Hubert Bayigamba (W) | 6 ft 2 in (1.88 m) | 190 lb (86 kg) | Sr | Wootton HS | Gaithersburg, MD |
| F | 21 | Mate Okros | 6 ft 6 in (1.98 m) | 215 lb (98 kg) | GS | Myerscough | Debrecen, Hungary |
| C | 22 | Amari Williams | 6 ft 10 in (2.08 m) | 255 lb (116 kg) | Sr | Myerscough | Nottingham, United Kingdom |
| F | 23 | Yame Butler | 6 ft 5 in (1.96 m) | 210 lb (95 kg) | Sr | Fork Union/Fordham | Greenbelt, MD |
| G | 25 | Max Davis (W) (redshirt) | 6 ft 4 in (1.93 m) | 205 lb (93 kg) | So | IMG Academy | New York, NY |
| G | 30 | Maximus Fuentes (W) | 6 ft 3 in (1.91 m) | 185 lb (84 kg) | So | North Broward Prep | Boca Raton, FL |

Head coach

- Zach Spiker (Ithaca)

Assistant coach(es)

- Paul Fortier (Washington)
- Will Chavis (Texas Tech)
- Frantz Massenat (Drexel)

Legend

- (C) Team captain
- (S) Suspended
- (I) Ineligible
- (W) Walk-on
- Injured
- Current redshirt

Roster
Last update: October 24, 2023

== Schedule and results ==
| Date time, TV | Rank^{#} | Opponent^{#} | Result | Record | High points | High rebounds | High assists | Site (attendance) city, state |
Non-conference regular season
| November 7, 2023*; 6:30 pm, ESPN+ | | at La Salle; Big 5 Classic Pod 1 | L 61–67 | 0–1 | 16 – Williams | 7 – Tied | 5 – Moore | Tom Gola Arena (1,641); Philadelphia, PA |
| November 11, 2023*; 5:30 pm, ESPN+ | | at Winthrop | W 74–72 | 1–1 | 18 – Williams | 11 – Williams | 4 – Moore | Winthrop Coliseum (2,501); Rock Hill, SC |
| November 14, 2023*; 7:00 pm, NBCSPHI+ | | Temple; Big 5 Classic Pod 1 | L 64–66 | 1–2 | 20 – House | 9 – Williams | 4 – Moore | Daskalakis Athletic Center (2,509); Philadelphia, PA |
| November 17, 2023*; 7:00 pm, NBCSPHI | | Fairfield; Market Street Challenge | W 65–47 | 2–2 | 13 – Williams | 13 – Williams | 3 – Tied | Daskalakis Athletic Center (1,706); Philadelphia, PA |
| November 19, 2023*; 2:00 pm, FloHoops | | Queens; Market Street Challenge | W 62–52 | 3–2 | 13 – Turner | 9 – Oden, Jr. | 3 – Tied | Daskalakis Athletic Center (871); Philadelphia, PA |
| November 26, 2023*; 2:00 pm, ESPN+ | | at Old Dominion | L 61–68 ^{OT} | 3–3 | 19 – Williams | 9 – Oden Jr. | 3 – Moore | Chartway Arena (4,238); Norfolk, VA |
| November 29, 2023*; 7:00 pm, ESPN+ | | at Lafayette | W 69–48 | 4–3 | 14 – Okros | 7 – Tied | 3 – MaGee | Kirby Sports Center (1,017); Easton, PA |
| December 2, 2023*; 2:00 pm, NBCSPHI+ | | vs. No. 18 Villanova; Big 5 Classic fifth place game | W 57–55 | 5–3 | 12 – Williams | 6 – Tied | 4 – Moore | Wells Fargo Center (15,215); Philadelphia, PA |
| December 5, 2023*; 7:00 pm, ESPN+ | | at Princeton | L 70–81 | 5–4 | 19 – Moore | 7 – House | 1 – Tied | Jadwin Gymnasium (1,478); Princeton, NJ |
| December 9, 2023*; 4:00 pm, ESPN+ | | at West Virginia | L 60–66 | 5–5 | 20 – Moore | 15 – Williams | 4 – Moore | WVU Coliseum (9,414); Morgantown, WV |
| December 16, 2023*; 2:00 pm, FloHoops | | Albany | W 71–52 | 6–5 | 14 – Williams | 11 – Williams | 3 – Tied | Daskalakis Athletic Center (991); Philadelphia, PA |
| December 18, 2023*; 11:00 am, FloHoops | | Penn State Greater Allegheny | W 117–49 | 7–5 | 16 – Okros | 7 – Oden Jr. | 6 – Tied | Daskalakis Athletic Center (1,367); Philadelphia, PA |
| December 22, 2023*; 11:00 am, ESPN+ | | at Bryant | L 86–104 | 7–6 | 34 – Moore | 10 – Williams | 5 – Williams | Chace Athletic Center (1,201); Smithfield, RI |
CAA regular season
| January 1, 2024; 12:00 pm, CBSSN | | Hampton | W 99–65 | 8–6 (1–0) | 20 – Okros | 6 – Tied | 5 – Moore | Daskalakis Athletic Center (1,123); Philadelphia, PA |
| January 4, 2024; 7:00 pm, NBCSPHI | | UNC Wilmington | W 78–63 | 9–6 (2–0) | 25 – House | 7 – Moore | 7 – Moore | Daskalakis Athletic Center (1,006); Philadelphia, PA |
| January 6, 2024; 2:00 pm, FloHoops | | at William & Mary | W 77–55 | 10–6 (3–0) | 22 – Moore | 11 – Monroe | 3 – Tied | Kaplan Arena (3,286); Williamsburg, VA |
| January 11, 2024; 7:00 pm, FloHoops | | at North Carolina A&T | W 67–63 | 11–6 (4–0) | 15 – Williams | 9 – Williams | 2 – Tied | Corbett Sports Center (758); Greensboro, NC |
| January 13, 2024; 7:00 pm, FloHoops | | at Elon | W 89–69 | 12–6 (5–0) | 22 – Okros | 7 – Turner | 7 – Moore | Schar Center (1,770); Elon, NC |
| January 18, 2024; 7:00 pm, CBSSN | | Monmouth | W 78–74 | 13–6 (6–0) | 21 – Williams | 11 – Williams | 4 – Moore | Daskalakis Athletic Center (1,348); Philadelphia, PA |
| January 20, 2024; 2:00 pm, NBCSPHI | | Delaware | W 86–67 | 14–6 (7–0) | 18 – Moore | 12 – Monroe | 7 – Moore | Daskalakis Athletic Center (2,461); Philadelphia, PA |
| January 25, 2024; 7:00 pm, FloHoops | | at Towson | L 67–70 | 14–7 (7–1) | 17 – Moore | 11 – Williams | 5 – Moore | SECU Arena (2,804); Towson, MD |
| January 27, 2024; 2:00 pm, FloHoops | | North Carolina A&T | W 62–47 | 15–7 (8–1) | 12 – Blakeney | 9 – Turner | 3 – Moore | Daskalakis Athletic Center (1,739); Philadelphia, PA |
| February 1, 2024; 7:00 pm, FloHoops | | at Monmouth | L 62–67 | 15–8 (8–2) | 12 – Tied | 8 – Tied | 2 – Tied | OceanFirst Bank Center (1,672); West Long Branch, NJ |
| February 8, 2024; 7:00 pm, FloHoops | | at UNC Wilmington | L 56–75 | 15–9 (8–3) | 16 – Bergens | 14 – Williams | 2 – Tied | Trask Coliseum (5,100); Wilmington, NC |
| February 10, 2024; 3:30 pm, FloHoops | | at Charleston | L 70–80 | 15–10 (8–4) | 20 – Williams | 8 – Williams | 4 – Moore | TD Arena (4,750); Charleston, SC |
| February 15, 2024; 7:00 pm, NBCSPHI | | Hofstra | W 79–77 | 16–10 (9–4) | 16 – Bergens | 6 – Williams | 4 – Moore | Daskalakis Athletic Center (1,678); Philadelphia, PA |
| February 17, 2024; 2:00 pm, FloHoops | | Campbell | W 81–66 | 17–10 (10–4) | 18 – House | 9 – Monroe | 4 – Moore | Daskalakis Athletic Center (1,502); Philadelphia, PA |
| February 22, 2024; 7:00 pm, CBSSN | | at Hofstra | L 57–69 | 17–11 (10–5) | 15 – Williams | 6 – Tied | 2 – Butler | Mack Sports Complex; Hempstead, NY |
| February 26, 2024; 6:30 pm, CBSSN | | at Delaware | W 70–60 | 18–11 (11–5) | 20 – Moore | 11 – Williams | 4 – Moore | Bob Carpenter Center (3,390); Newark, DE |
| February 29, 2024; 7:00 pm, NBCSPHI | | Stony Brook | W 90–86 | 19–11 (12–5) | 25 – Moore | 8 – Williams | 6 – Moore | Daskalakis Athletic Center (1,467); Philadelphia, PA |
| March 2, 2024; 4:00 pm, FloHoops | | Northeastern | W 73–59 | 20–11 (13–5) | 23 – House | 9 – Monroe | 6 – Bergens | Daskalakis Athletic Center (2,007); Philadelphia, PA |
CAA Tournament
| March 10, 2024; 6:00 pm, FloHoops | (2) | vs. (7) Stony Brook; Quarterfinal | L 88–91 ^{2OT} | 20–12 | 28 – House | 9 – Turner | 6 – Moore | Entertainment and Sports Arena; Washington, D.C. |
*Non-conference game. ^{#}Rankings from AP. (#) Tournament seedings in parentheses. All times are in Eastern Time.

== Awards ==
Zach Spiker

- Philadelphia Big 5 Coach Of The Year

Luke House

- Donald Shank Spirit & Dedication Award

Kobe MaGee

- Samuel D. Cozen Award (team's most improved player)

Justin Moore

- CAA All-Conference Third Team
- Preseason CAA All-Conference Honorable Mention
- Assist Award (team leader in assists)

Mate Okros

- Team Academic Award

Amari Williams

- CAA Defensive Player of the Year
- CAA All-Conference First Team
- CAA All-Defensive Team
- Philadelphia Big 5 First Team
- Preseason CAA Player of the Year
- Preseason CAA All-Conference First Team
- Team Most Valuable Player
- Dragon "D" Award (team's top defensive player)
- "Sweep" Award (team leader in rebounds)

== See also ==
- 2023–24 Drexel Dragons women's basketball team
