= 2023–24 Binghamton Bearcats men's basketball team =

American college basketball season

2023–24 Binghamton Bearcats men's basketball
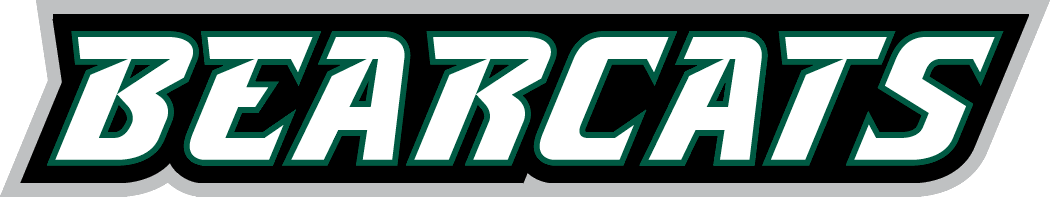
- Conference: America East Conference
- Record: 15–15 (7–9 America East)
- Head coach: Levell Sanders (3rd season)
- Associate head coach: Brian Johnson
- Assistant coaches: Marlon Guild; Patrick Norris
- Home arena: Binghamton University Events Center

2023–24 America East Conference men's basketball standings
	Conf.				Overall
Team	W		L	PCT	W		L	PCT
Vermont †	15	–	1	.938	28	–	7	.800
UMass Lowell	11	–	5	.688	22	–	10	.688
Bryant	11	–	5	.688	20	–	13	.606
New Hampshire	7	–	9	.438	16	–	15	.516
Binghamton	7	–	9	.438	15	–	15	.500
Maine	7	–	9	.438	15	–	17	.469
UMBC	6	–	10	.375	11	–	21	.344
Albany	5	–	11	.313	13	–	19	.406
NJIT	3	–	13	.188	7	–	21	.250
† 2024 AmEast tournament winner

The 2023–24 Binghamton Bearcats men's basketball team represented Binghamton University during the 2023–24 NCAA Division I men's basketball season. They played their home games at the Binghamton University Events Center located in Vestal, New York, and were led by third-year head coach Levell Sanders.

== Previous season ==
The Bearcats finished the 2022–23 season 13–18, 8–8 in America East play for a three-way-tie for fourth place. They defeated UMBC in the quarterfinals of the America East Tournament, before losing to Vermont in the semifinals.

== Roster ==
2023–24 Binghamton Bearcats men's basketball team
Players
Coaches

Pos.	#	Name	Height	Weight	Year	Previous school	Hometown
G	0	Tymu Chenery	6 ft 6 in (1.98 m)	195 lb (88 kg)	Jr	Quinnipiac	Philadelphia, PA
F	1	Tariq Balogun	6 ft 10 in (2.08 m)	245 lb (111 kg)	Sr	Eastern Kentucky	London, England
G	2	Armon Harried	6 ft 5 in (1.96 m)	205 lb (93 kg)	Sr	Canisius	Baltimore, MD
G	3	Evan Ashe	6 ft 3 in (1.91 m)	190 lb (86 kg)	Fr	The Winchendon School	Charlotte, NC
G	4	Masud Stewart	6 ft 1 in (1.85 m)	190 lb (86 kg)	So	Neumann-Goretti High School	Philadelphia, PA
G	5	Robby Phillips	6 ft 5 in (1.96 m)	205 lb (93 kg)	So	Fairleigh Dickinson	Ridgewood, NJ
F	10	Taveion White	6 ft 8 in (2.03 m)	220 lb (100 kg)	GS	Clarendon College	Prosper, TX
G	11	Dan Petcash	6 ft 4 in (1.93 m)	205 lb (93 kg)	GS	Pine-Richland High School	Pittsburgh, PA
G	13	Chris Walker	6 ft 6 in (1.98 m)	195 lb (88 kg)	So	Little Rock	West Palm Beach, FL
F	22	Gavin Walsh	6 ft 8 in (2.03 m)	225 lb (102 kg)	Fr	Loyola Blakefield	Baltimore, MD
G	23	Symir Torrence	6 ft 3 in (1.91 m)	200 lb (91 kg)	GS	Syracuse	Syracuse, NY
F	24	Nehemiah Benson	6 ft 7 in (2.01 m)	215 lb (98 kg)	Sr	Lutheran High School East	Streetsboro, OH
F	33	Stephan Snagg	6 ft 7 in (2.01 m)	190 lb (86 kg)	Fr	New Hampton School	Queens, NY
G	35	Max Sims	6 ft 5 in (1.96 m)	190 lb (86 kg)	Fr	IMG Academy	Tampa, FL

Head coach

- Levell Sanders (Seton Hall)

Assistant coach(es)

- Brian Johnson (Delaware)
- Marlon Guild (Hartford)
- Patrick Norris (Notre Dame)

Legend

- (C) Team captain
- (S) Suspended
- (I) Ineligible
- (W) Walk-on
- Injured
- Current redshirt

Roster
Last update: November 12, 2023

== Schedule and results ==
Date time, TV	Rank^{#}	Opponent^{#}	Result	Record	Site (attendance) city, state
Exhibition
November 1, 2023*; 6:07 pm		D'Youville	W 88–56	–	Binghamton University Events Center (1,027); Vestal, NY
Non-conference regular season
November 6, 2023*; 8:00 pm, B1G+		at Northwestern	L 61–72	0–1	Welsh–Ryan Arena (4,170); Evanston, IL
November 10, 2023*; 7:00 pm, ACCNX/ESPN+		at Pittsburgh	L 60–89	0–2	Petersen Events Center (7,747); Pittsburgh, PA
November 12, 2023*; 6:07 pm, ESPN+		Keystone	W 104–50	1–2	Binghamton University Events Center (1,138); Vestal, NY
November 15, 2023*; 7:00 pm, ESPN+		at Loyola (MD)	W 63–57	2–2	Reitz Arena (1,204); Baltimore, MD
November 18, 2023*; 3:30 pm, ESPN+		Marist	W 82–59	3–2	Binghamton University Events Center (2,164); Vestal, NY
November 21, 2023*; 11:30 am, NEC Front Row		at Sacred Heart	L 75–89	3–3	William H. Pitt Center (1,209); Fairfield, CT
November 25, 2023*; 2:00 pm, ESPN+		Army	W 75–68	4–3	Binghamton University Events Center (1,508); Vestal, NY
November 29, 2023*; 8:30 pm, ESPN+		at Colgate	L 49–84	4–4	Cotterell Court (762); Hamilton, NY
December 2, 2023*; 2:00 pm, NEC Front Row		at Stonehill	W 79–64	5–4	Merkert Gymnasium (725); Easton, MA
December 9, 2023*; 2:00 pm, ESPN+		Le Moyne	W 91–79	6–4	Binghamton University Events Center (3,583); Vestal, NY
December 19, 2023*; 6:07 pm, ESPN+		Niagara	W 74–69	7–4	Binghamton University Events Center (1,533); Vestal, NY
December 22, 2023*; 7:00 pm, ESPN+		at St. Bonaventure	L 64–90	7–5	Reilly Center (3,965); St. Bonaventure, NY
December 30, 2023*; 3:30 pm, ESPN+		Marywood	W 108–52	8–5	Binghamton University Events Center (1,947); Vestal, NY
America East regular season
January 11, 2024; 7:00 pm, ESPN+		at Bryant	L 69–77	8–6 (0–1)	Chace Athletic Center (874); Smithfield, RI
January 13, 2024; 4:00 pm, ESPN+		at Albany	L 75–95	8–7 (0–2)	Broadview Center (2,164); Albany, NY
January 18, 2024; 6:07 pm, ESPN+		Vermont	L 62–82	8–8 (0–3)	Binghamton University Events Center (3,345); Vestal, NY
January 20, 2024; 2:00 pm, ESPN+		UMass Lowell	L 60–80	8–9 (0–4)	Binghamton University Events Center (2,028); Vestal, NY
January 25, 2024; 7:00 pm, ESPN+		at New Hampshire	L 73–79 ^{OT}	8–10 (0–5)	Lundholm Gym (526); Durham, NH
January 27, 2024; 2:00 pm, ESPN+		at Maine	W 51–50	9–10 (1–5)	Memorial Gymnasium (1,287); Orono, ME
February 1, 2024; 6:07 pm, ESPN+		NJIT	W 75–66	10–10 (2–5)	Binghamton University Events Center (1,898); Vestal, NY
February 3, 2024; 2:00 pm, ESPN+		at Vermont	L 49–62	10–11 (2–6)	Patrick Gym (3,000); Burlington, VT
February 8, 2024; 6:07 pm, ESPN+		Albany	W 69–57	11–11 (3–6)	Binghamton University Events Center (2,543); Vestal, NY
February 10, 2024; 2:00 pm, ESPN+		Bryant	L 69–70	11–12 (3–7)	Binghamton University Events Center (2,831); Vestal, NY
February 15, 2024; 6:07 pm, ESPN+		UMBC	L 78–89	11–13 (3–8)	Binghamton University Events Center (2,102); Vestal, NY
February 17, 2024; 3:30 pm, ESPN+		at NJIT	W 69–55	12–13 (4–8)	Wellness and Events Center (472); Newark, NJ
February 22, 2024; 6:30 pm, ESPN+		at UMass Lowell	L 80–87	12–14 (4–9)	Costello Athletic Center (625); Lowell, MA
February 29, 2024; 6:07 pm, ESPN+		Maine	W 76–74 ^{OT}	13–14 (5–9)	Binghamton University Events Center (2,539); Vestal, NY
March 2, 2024; 2:00 pm, ESPN+		New Hampshire	W 87–74	14–14 (6–9)	Binghamton University Events Center (2,071); Vestal, NY
March 5, 2024; 7:00 pm, ESPN+		at UMBC	W 72–71	15–14 (7–9)	Chesapeake Employers Insurance Arena (1,875); Catonsville, MD
America East tournament
March 9, 2024; 3:00 pm, ESPN+	(5)	at (4) New Hampshire; Quarterfinals	L 64–77	15–15	Lundholm Gym (974); Durham, NH
*Non-conference game. ^{#}Rankings from AP Poll. (#) Tournament seedings in parentheses. All times are in Eastern.
