= 2023–24 Monmouth Hawks men's basketball team =

American college basketball season

2023–24 Monmouth Hawks men's basketball
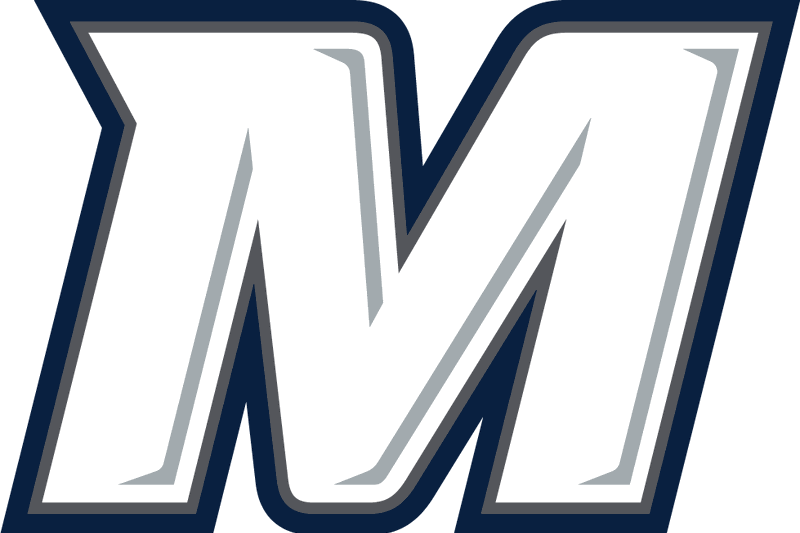
- Conference: Coastal Athletic Association
- Record: 18–15 (10–8 CAA)
- Head coach: King Rice (13th season)
- Assistant coaches: Rick Callahan; Brian Reese; Clive Bentick; Justin Dempsey
- Home arena: OceanFirst Bank Center

2023–24 CAA men's basketball standings
	Conf.				Overall
Team	W		L	PCT	W		L	PCT
Charleston †	15	–	3	.833	27	–	8	.771
Drexel	13	–	5	.722	20	–	12	.625
Hofstra	12	–	6	.667	20	–	13	.606
UNC Wilmington	12	–	6	.667	21	–	10	.677
Towson	11	–	7	.611	20	–	14	.588
Delaware	10	–	8	.556	19	–	14	.576
Stony Brook	10	–	8	.556	20	–	15	.571
Monmouth	10	–	8	.556	18	–	15	.545
Campbell	8	–	10	.444	14	–	18	.438
Northeastern	7	–	11	.389	12	–	20	.375
Elon	6	–	12	.333	13	–	19	.406
North Carolina A&T	5	–	13	.278	7	–	25	.219
William & Mary	4	–	14	.222	10	–	23	.303
Hampton	3	–	15	.167	9	–	24	.273
† 2024 CAA tournament winner

The 2023–24 Monmouth Hawks men's basketball team represented Monmouth University during the 2023–24 NCAA Division I men's basketball season. The Hawks, led by 13th-year head coach King Rice, played their home games at OceanFirst Bank Center in West Long Branch, New Jersey, as members of the Coastal Athletic Association (CAA).

== Previous season ==
The Hawks finished the 2022–23 season 7–26, 5–13 in CAA play, to finish tied for last place. They defeated Hampton in the first round of the CAA tournament, before losing to Drexel in the second round.

== Roster ==
2023–24 Monmouth Hawks men's basketball team
Players
Coaches

Pos.	#	Name	Height	Weight	Year	Previous school	Hometown
G	0	Jayden Doyle	6 ft 4 in (1.93 m)	200 lb (91 kg)	RS So	South Kent School	Knoxville, TN
G	1	Abdi Jr. Bashir	6 ft 7 in (2.01 m)	160 lb (73 kg)	Fr	PHHoenix Prep	Omaha, NE
F	2	Jaret Valencia	6 ft 9 in (2.06 m)	190 lb (86 kg)	RS Fr	Legacy SSS	Quibdó, Colombia
G	3	Jakari Spence	6 ft 2 in (1.88 m)	175 lb (79 kg)	Sr	Robert Morris	Toms River, NJ
G	4	Andrew Ball	6 ft 8 in (2.03 m)	210 lb (95 kg)	So	Shawnee HS	Marlton, NJ
G	5	Corey Miller	6 ft 2 in (1.88 m)	185 lb (84 kg)	Fr	The Pennington School	Ocean Township, NJ
G	10	Jack Leahy	6 ft 5 in (1.96 m)	210 lb (95 kg)	Fr	Wyoming Seminary	Long Branch, NJ
G	11	Gabe Spinelli	6 ft 2 in (1.88 m)	190 lb (86 kg)	So	Evansville	Worcester, MA
G	13	Jack Collins	6 ft 5 in (1.96 m)	200 lb (91 kg)	So	The Phelps School	Manasquan, NJ
G	14	Jack Holmstrom	6 ft 6 in (1.98 m)	200 lb (91 kg)	GS	Guilford HS	Rockford, IL
C	15	Amaan Sandhu	7 ft 1 in (2.16 m)	265 lb (120 kg)	So	First Love Christian Academy	Punjab, India
G	21	Xander Rice	6 ft 3 in (1.91 m)	190 lb (86 kg)	GS	Bucknell	West Long Branch, NJ
F	23	Cornelius Jr. Robinson	6 ft 6 in (1.98 m)	225 lb (102 kg)	Fr	Camden HS	Willingboro Township, NJ
F	25	Nikita Konstantynovskyi	6 ft 10 in (2.08 m)	245 lb (111 kg)	GS	Tulsa	Kyiv, Ukraine
G	30	Sam Fagan	6 ft 1 in (1.85 m)	175 lb (79 kg)	Jr	Neptune HS	Lake Como, NJ
F	35	Klemen Vuga	6 ft 9 in (2.06 m)	240 lb (109 kg)	Sr	Virginia Episcopal School	Mengeš, Slovenia
F	42	Quinn Peters	6 ft 6 in (1.98 m)	210 lb (95 kg)	Fr	Manasquan HS	Spring Lake Heights, NJ
F	50	Braedan Allen	6 ft 8 in (2.03 m)	225 lb (102 kg)	Sr	CC of Baltimore County Essex	Warrenton, VA
C	99	Tadhg Crowley	6 ft 10 in (2.08 m)	270 lb (122 kg)	Jr	Trinity-Pawling School	Yonkers, NY

Head coach

- King Rice (North Carolina)

Assistant coach(es)

- Rick Callahan (Salem)
- Brian Reese (North Carolina)
- Clive Bentick (Canisius)
- Justin Dempsey (Monmouth)

Legend

- (C) Team captain
- (S) Suspended
- (I) Ineligible
- (W) Walk-on
- Injured
- Current redshirt

Roster
Last update: November 21, 2023

== Schedule and results ==
Date time, TV	Rank^{#}	Opponent^{#}	Result	Record	Site (attendance) city, state
Exhibition
October 21, 2023*; 6:00 p.m.		Rhode Island College	W 91–44	–	OceanFirst Bank Center (471); West Long Branch, NJ
Non-conference regular season
November 6, 2023*; 7:00 p.m., ESPN+		at George Mason	L 61–72	0–1	EagleBank Arena (3,145); Fairfax, VA
November 10, 2023*; 7:00 p.m., ESPN+		at West Virginia	W 73–65	1–1	WVU Coliseum (10,473); Morgantown, WV
November 18, 2023*; 2:00 p.m., FloHoops/SNY		Princeton	L 57–82	1–2	OceanFirst Bank Center (2,656); West Long Branch, NJ
November 21, 2023*; 7:00 p.m., FloHoops/NBCSPHI		Lehigh	W 88–79	2–2	OceanFirst Bank Center (1,310); West Long Branch, NJ
November 24, 2023*; 2:00 p.m., ESPN+		vs. Belmont; Cathedral of College Basketball Classic	W 93–84	3–2	The Palestra; Philadelphia, PA
November 25, 2023*; 2:00 p.m., ESPN+		vs. Lafayette; Cathedral of College Basketball Classic	W 63–53	4–2	The Palestra; Philadelphia, PA
November 26, 2023*; 2:30 p.m., ESPN+		at Penn; Cathedral of College Basketball Classic	L 61–76	4–3	The Palestra (840); Philadelphia, PA
November 29, 2023*; 7:00 p.m., ESPN+		at Cornell	L 87–91	4–4	Newman Arena (871); Ithaca, NY
December 9, 2023*; 2:00 p.m., FloHoops/SNY/NBCSPHI		Northern Illinois	W 74–71	5–4	OceanFirst Bank Center (1,722); West Long Branch, NJ
December 12, 2023*; 6:30 p.m., FS1		at Seton Hall	L 61–70	5–5	Prudential Center (8,053); Newark, NJ
December 16, 2023*; 2:00 p.m., FloHoops/SNY/NBCSPHI		Rider	W 77–71	6–5	OceanFirst Bank Center (1,776); West Long Branch, NJ
December 21, 2023*; 2:00 p.m., FloHoops/SNY		Manhattan	W 77–71	7–5	OceanFirst Bank Center (1,407); West Long Branch, NJ
December 31, 2023*; 2:00 p.m., ESPN+		at No. 12 Oklahoma	L 56–72	7–6	Lloyd Noble Center (6,683); Norman, OK
CAA regular season
January 4, 2024; 7:00 p.m., FloHoops/SNY		Towson	W 51–43	8–6 (1–0)	OceanFirst Bank Center (1,484); West Long Branch, NJ
January 8, 2024; 7:00 p.m., CBSSN		Northeastern	W 81–62	9–6 (2–0)	OceanFirst Bank Center (1,190); West Long Branch, NJ
January 11, 2024; 7:00 p.m., FloHoops		at UNC Wilmington	L 56–69	9–7 (2–1)	Trask Coliseum (5,100); Wilmington, NC
January 13, 2024; 4:30 p.m., FloHoops		at Charleston	L 83–94	9–8 (2–2)	TD Arena (4,790); Charleston, SC
January 18, 2024; 7:00 p.m., CBSSN		at Drexel	L 74–78	9–9 (2–3)	Daskalakis Athletic Center (1,348); Philadelphia, PA
January 20, 2024; 2:00 p.m., FloHoops		Hampton	W 85–77	10–9 (3–3)	OceanFirst Bank Center (2,440); West Long Branch, NJ
January 25, 2024; 6:30 p.m., FloHoops		at Stony Brook	L 65–72	10–10 (3–4)	Island Federal Arena (1,905); Stony Brook, NY
January 27, 2024; 2:00 p.m., FloHoops		Hofstra	W 81–78	11–10 (4–4)	OceanFirst Bank Center (2,276); West Long Branch, NJ
February 1, 2024; 7:00 p.m., FloHoops/SNY/NBCSPHI		Drexel	W 67–62	12–10 (5–4)	OceanFirst Bank Center (1,672); West Long Branch, NJ
February 3, 2024; 2:00 p.m., FloHoops		at Delaware	L 80–84	12–11 (5–5)	Bob Carpenter Center (3,037); Newark, DE
February 8, 2024; 7:00 p.m., FloHoops/SNY/NBCSPHI		William & Mary	W 68–64	13–11 (6–5)	OceanFirst Bank Center (1,586); West Long Branch, NJ
February 10, 2024; 1:00 p.m., FloHoops		at Northeastern	L 65–77	13–12 (6–6)	Matthews Arena (801); Boston, MA
February 15, 2024; 7:00 p.m., FloHoops		Campbell	W 88–87	14–12 (7–6)	OceanFirst Bank Center (1,582); West Long Branch, NJ
February 17, 2024; 4:00 p.m., FloHoops/SNY/NBCSPHI		Stony Brook	W 84–61	15–12 (8–6)	OceanFirst Bank Center (2,511); West Long Branch, NJ
February 22, 2024; 7:00 p.m., FloHoops		at Towson	L 61–80	15–13 (8–7)	SECU Arena (1,910); Towson, MD
February 24, 2024; 2:00 p.m., FloHoops/NBCSPHI		North Carolina A&T	W 83–67	16–13 (9–7)	OceanFirst Bank Center (2,353); West Long Branch, NJ
February 29, 2024; 7:00 p.m., FloHoops		at Hampton	L 56–64	16–14 (9–8)	Hampton Convocation Center (1,008); Hampton, VA
March 2, 2024; 1:00 p.m., FloHoops		at Elon	W 85–70	17–14 (10–8)	Schar Center (1,735); Elon, NC
CAA tournament
March 9, 2024; 12:00 p.m., FloHoops	(8)	vs. (9) Campbell; Second round	W 90–67	18–14	Entertainment and Sports Arena; Washington, D.C.
March 10, 2024; 12:00 p.m., FloHoops	(8)	vs. (1) Charleston; Quarterfinals	L 59–83	18–15	Entertainment and Sports Arena (–); Washington, D.C.
*Non-conference game. ^{#}Rankings from AP poll. (#) Tournament seedings in parentheses. All times are in Eastern.
