= 2024 America East men's basketball tournament =

American college basketball postseason tournament

- Classification: Division I
- Season: 2023–24
- Teams: 8
- Site: Campus sites
- Champions: Vermont (10th title)
- Winning coach: John Becker (6th title)
- MVP: Shamir Bogues (Vermont)
- Attendance: 11,941 (total); 3,000 (championship)
- Television: ESPN+ ESPN2

2023–24 America East Conference men's basketball standings
| | Conf. | | | | Overall |
| Team | W | | L | PCT | W | | L | PCT |
|---|---|---|---|---|---|---|---|---|
| Vermont † | 15 | – | 1 | .938 | 28 | – | 7 | .800 |
| UMass Lowell | 11 | – | 5 | .688 | 22 | – | 10 | .688 |
| Bryant | 11 | – | 5 | .688 | 20 | – | 13 | .606 |
| New Hampshire | 7 | – | 9 | .438 | 16 | – | 15 | .516 |
| Binghamton | 7 | – | 9 | .438 | 15 | – | 15 | .500 |
| Maine | 7 | – | 9 | .438 | 15 | – | 17 | .469 |
| UMBC | 6 | – | 10 | .375 | 11 | – | 21 | .344 |
| Albany | 5 | – | 11 | .313 | 13 | – | 19 | .406 |
| NJIT | 3 | – | 13 | .188 | 7 | – | 21 | .250 |
† 2024 AmEast tournament winner

The 2024 America East Men's Basketball Conference tournament was the postseason men's basketball tournament for the America East Conference. It was held March 9–16, 2024, at campus sites of the higher seeds. The winner, Vermont, received the conference's automatic bid to the 2024 NCAA Tournament. The tournament was sponsored by Jersey Mike's Subs.

== Seeds ==
Eight of the nine America East teams qualified for the tournament. The teams were seeded by record in conference, with a tiebreaker system to seed teams with identical conference records.

The tiebreaker steps are 1) head-to-head records in games involving the tied teams; 2) winning percentage versus conference opponents in descending rank order, taking into account groups of teams tied in the standings rather than individual tied teams; 3) winning percentage in conference road games; 4} better NCAA NET ranking through end of conference regular-season games. If a multiple-team tiebreaker resolves part but not all of the tie, the remaining tied teams revert to the first step of a new tiebreaker.

| Seed | School | AEC Record | Tiebreaker 1 | Tiebreaker 2 |
|---|---|---|---|---|
| 1 | Vermont | 15–1 | | |
| 2 | UMass Lowell | 11–5 | 2–0 vs. Bryant | |
| 3 | Bryant | 11–5 | 0–2 vs. UMass Lowell | |
| 4 | New Hampshire | 7–9 | 3–1 vs. Binghamton/Maine | 1–1 vs. UMass Lowell |
| 5 | Binghamton | 7–9 | 3–1 vs. UNH/Maine | 0–2 vs. UMass Lowell |
| 6 | Maine | 7–9 | 0–4 vs. UNH/Binghamton | |
| 7 | UMBC | 6–10 | | |
| 8 | Albany | 5–11 | | |
| DNQ | NJIT | 3–13 | | |

== Schedule ==
| Game | Time* | Matchup^{#} | Score | Television | Attendance |
Quarterfinals – Saturday, March 9
| 1 | 3:00 pm | No. 8 Albany at No. 1 Vermont | 72–75 | ESPN+ | 2,692 |
| 2 | 3:00 pm | No. 7 UMBC at No. 2 UMass Lowell | 89–94 ^{OT} | ESPN+ | 684 |
| 3 | 2:00 pm | No. 6 Maine at No. 3 Bryant | 58–84 | ESPN+ | 1,147 |
| 4 | 3:00 pm | No. 5 Binghamton at No. 4 New Hampshire | 64–77 | ESPN+ | 974 |
Semifinals – Tuesday, March 12
| 5 | 5:00 pm | No. 4 New Hampshire at No. 1 Vermont | 59–66 | ESPN2 | 2,487 |
| 6 | 6:00 pm | No. 3 Bryant at No. 2 UMass Lowell | 70–77 | ESPN+ | 957 |
Championship – Saturday, March 16
| 7 | 11:00 am | No. 2 UMass Lowell at No. 1 Vermont | 61–66 | ESPN2 | 3,000 |
*Game times in EST. #-Rankings denote tournament seeding.

== Bracket ==
Quarterfinals; March 8, 2024; ESPN
1 | Vermont | 75
8 | Albany | 72
4 | New Hampshire | 77
5 | Binghamton | 64
(Pairings are reseeded after the first round)
2 | UMass Lowell | 94*
7 | UMBC | 89
3 | Bryant | 84
6 | Maine | 58

Semifinals; March 11, 2024; ESPN3/ESPN
1 | Vermont | 66
4 | New Hampshire | 59
2 | UMass Lowell | 77
3 | Bryant | 70

Championship; March 15, 2024; ESPN3
1 | Vermont | 66
2 | UMass Lowell | 61

* denotes overtime

== See also ==
- America East Conference men's basketball tournament
