= 2023–24 Bryant Bulldogs men's basketball team =

American college basketball season

2023–24 Bryant Bulldogs men's basketball
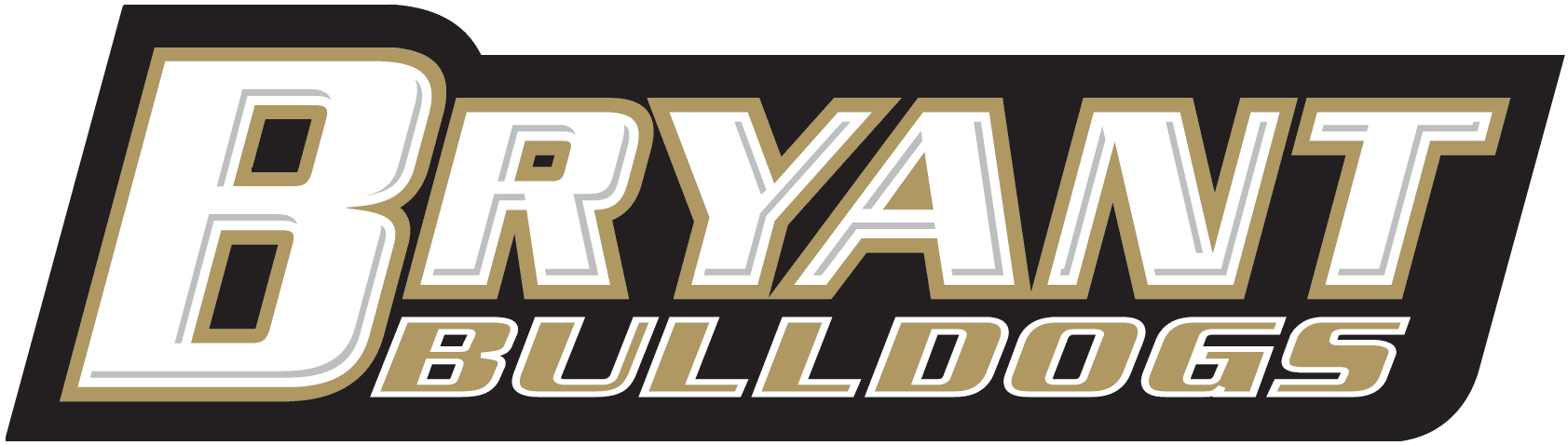
- Conference: America East Conference
- Record: 20–13 (11–5 America East)
- Head coach: Phil Martelli Jr. (1st season)
- Associate head coach: Chris Cole
- Assistant coaches: Brett Putz; Brendan Phelps
- Home arena: Chace Athletic Center

2023–24 America East Conference men's basketball standings
| | Conf. | | | | Overall |
| Team | W | | L | PCT | W | | L | PCT |
|---|---|---|---|---|---|---|---|---|
| Vermont † | 15 | – | 1 | .938 | 28 | – | 7 | .800 |
| UMass Lowell | 11 | – | 5 | .688 | 22 | – | 10 | .688 |
| Bryant | 11 | – | 5 | .688 | 20 | – | 13 | .606 |
| New Hampshire | 7 | – | 9 | .438 | 16 | – | 15 | .516 |
| Binghamton | 7 | – | 9 | .438 | 15 | – | 15 | .500 |
| Maine | 7 | – | 9 | .438 | 15 | – | 17 | .469 |
| UMBC | 6 | – | 10 | .375 | 11 | – | 21 | .344 |
| Albany | 5 | – | 11 | .313 | 13 | – | 19 | .406 |
| NJIT | 3 | – | 13 | .188 | 7 | – | 21 | .250 |
† 2024 AmEast tournament winner

The 2023–24 Bryant Bulldogs men's basketball team represented Bryant University during the 2023–24 NCAA Division I men's basketball season. The Bulldogs, led by first-year head coach Phil Martelli Jr., played their home games at the Chace Athletic Center in Smithfield, Rhode Island as members of the America East Conference.

On November 13, after being placed on leave in September, head coach Jared Grasso announced his resignation, with assistant coach Phil Martelli Jr. initially being named the interim head coach for the remainder of the 2023–24 season. Two days later, the interim tag was removed from Martelli and he was officially named head coach.

The Bulldogs finished the season 20–13, 11–5 in America East play, to finish in a tie for second place. They defeated Maine in the quarterfinals of the America East tournament before falling to UMass Lowell in the semifinals.

== Previous season ==
The Bulldogs finished the 2022–23 season 17–13, 8–8 in America East play, for a three-way tie for fourth place. They lost in the quarterfinals of the America East Tournament to New Hampshire.

== Roster ==
2023–24 Bryant Bulldogs men's basketball team
Players
Coaches

| Pos. | # | Name | Height | Weight | Year | Hometown |
|---|---|---|---|---|---|---|
| G | 0 | Earl Timberlake | 6 ft 6 in (1.98 m) | 220 lb (100 kg) | Sr | Washington, D.C. |
| F | 1 | Kvonn Cramer | 6 ft 7 in (2.01 m) | 225 lb (102 kg) | Sr | Wilmington, DE |
| G | 2 | Tyler Brelsford | 6 ft 4 in (1.93 m) | 183 lb (83 kg) | Sr | Ellicott City, MD |
| G | 3 | Sherif Gross-Bullock | 6 ft 5 in (1.96 m) | 215 lb (98 kg) | Sr | Washington, D.C. |
| G/F | 5 | Daniel Rivera | 6 ft 6 in (1.98 m) | 210 lb (95 kg) | Jr | San Juan, Puerto Rico |
| F | 7 | Connor Withers | 6 ft 8 in (2.03 m) | 200 lb (91 kg) | Sr | Manassas, VA |
| G | 10 | Todd Rochelle | 6 ft 3 in (1.91 m) | 185 lb (84 kg) | So | Queens, NY |
| G | 12 | Timmy Kiggins | 6 ft 0 in (1.83 m) | 180 lb (82 kg) | Sr | Westbury, NY |
| G | 13 | Greg Cantwell | 6 ft 3 in (1.91 m) | 165 lb (75 kg) | Fr | Mineola, NY |
| F | 15 | John Shannon | 6 ft 4 in (1.93 m) | 200 lb (91 kg) | So | Milford, CT |
| G | 20 | Miles Latimer | 6 ft 6 in (1.98 m) | 186 lb (84 kg) | Sr | Fairfax, VA |
| G | 21 | Aaron Davis | 6 ft 7 in (2.01 m) | 215 lb (98 kg) | Fr | Bay Shore, NY |
| F | 22 | Keyshawn Mitchell | 6 ft 11 in (2.11 m) | 215 lb (98 kg) | Fr | Brooklyn, NY |
| G | 24 | Rafael Pinzon | 6 ft 6 in (1.98 m) | 195 lb (88 kg) | Jr | Arecibo, Puerto Rico |
| G | 25 | Doug Edert | 6 ft 2 in (1.88 m) | 185 lb (84 kg) | Sr | Nutley, NJ |
| G | 40 | Jason Arukhe | 6 ft 6 in (1.98 m) | 200 lb (91 kg) | Fr | Calgary, AB |
| F | 50 | Josh Ozabor | 6 ft 7 in (2.01 m) | 220 lb (100 kg) | Jr | Johannesburg, South Africa |

Head coach

- Phil Martelli Jr. (Saint Joseph's)

Assistant coach(es)

- Chris Cole (New Mexico State)
- Brett Putz (St. Cloud State)
- Brendan Phelps (Eastern Connecticut State)

Legend

- (C) Team captain
- (S) Suspended
- (I) Ineligible
- (W) Walk-on
- Injured
- Current redshirt

Roster
Last update: July 17, 2024

== Schedule and results ==
| Date time, TV | Rank^{#} | Opponent^{#} | Result | Record | Site (attendance) city, state |
Non-conference regular season
| November 6, 2023*; 7:30 p.m., ESPN+ | | Manhattan | L 59–61 | 0–1 | Chace Athletic Center (752); Smithfield, RI |
| November 8, 2023*; 4:00 p.m., ESPN+ | | Fisher | W 140–79 | 1–1 | Chace Athletic Center (468); Smithfield, RI |
| November 12, 2023*; 12:00 p.m., B1G+ | | at Rutgers | L 57–66 | 1–2 | Jersey Mike's Arena (8,000); Piscataway, NJ |
| November 16, 2023*; 7:00 p.m., ESPN+ | | at Boston University | L 79–95 | 1–3 | Case Gym (1,268); Boston, MA |
| November 18, 2023*; 6:00 p.m., ESPN+ | | at No. 10 Florida Atlantic | W 61–52 | 2–3 | Eleanor R. Baldwin Arena (3,161); Boca Raton, FL |
| November 20, 2023*; 7:00 p.m., ESPN+ | | Howard | W 67–61 | 3–3 | Chace Athletic Center (754); Smithfield, RI |
| November 24, 2023*; 12:00 p.m., FS1 | | at Xavier | L 75–100 | 3–4 | Cintas Center (10,224); Cincinnati, OH |
| November 27, 2023*; 7:00 p.m., ESPN+ | | Springfield | W 108–74 | 4–4 | Chace Athletic Center (634); Smithfield, RI |
| December 1, 2023*; 7:00 p.m., ESPN+ | | at Brown; Ocean State Cup | W 69–66 | 5–4 | Pizzitola Sports Center (1,113); Providence, RI |
| December 6, 2023*; 7:00 p.m., ESPN+ | | at Siena | W 67–51 | 6–4 | MVP Arena (4,233); Albany, NY |
| December 9, 2023*; 6:31 pm, SNY/FloHoops | | at Stony Brook | L 75–86 | 6–5 | Island Federal Arena (2,225); Stony Brook, NY |
| December 12, 2023*; 7:00 p.m., ESPN+ | | at Cincinnati | L 53–85 | 6–6 | Fifth Third Arena (9,303); Cincinnati, OH |
| December 16, 2023*; 2:00 p.m., FloHoops | | vs. Towson; Holiday Hoopfest | W 101–93 ^{2OT} | 7–6 | UBS Arena; Elmont, NY |
| December 22, 2023*; 11:00 a.m., ESPN+ | | Drexel | W 104–86 | 8–6 | Chace Athletic Center (1,201); Smithfield, RI |
| December 31, 2023*; 4:00 p.m., SECN | | at No. 24 Ole Miss | L 78–95 | 8–7 | SJB Pavilion (7,934); Oxford, MS |
America East regular season
| January 6, 2024; 1:00 p.m., ESPN+ | | at UMBC | W 81–67 | 9–7 (1–0) | Chesapeake Employers Insurance Arena (715); Catonsville, MD |
| January 11, 2024; 7:00 p.m., ESPN+ | | Binghamton | W 77–69 | 10–7 (2–0) | Chace Athletic Center (874); Smithfield, RI |
| January 13, 2024; 7:00 p.m., ESPN+ | | at New Hampshire | W 89–74 | 11–7 (3–0) | Lundholm Gym (652); Durham, NH |
| January 20, 2024; 7:00 p.m., ESPN+ | | at Albany | W 98–89 | 12–7 (4–0) | Broadview Center (2,501); Albany, NY |
| January 25, 2024; 7:00 p.m., ESPN+ | | at NJIT | W 70–55 | 13–7 (5–0) | Wellness and Events Center (444); Newark, NJ |
| January 27, 2024; 4:00 p.m., ESPN+ | | Vermont | L 57–67 | 13–8 (5–1) | Chace Athletic Center; Smithfield, RI |
| February 1, 2024; 7:00 p.m., ESPN+ | | UMBC | W 99–95 | 14–8 (6–1) | Chace Athletic Center (975); Smithfield, RI |
| February 3, 2024; 3:00 p.m., ESPN+ | | at Maine | L 72–79 | 14–9 (6–2) | Memorial Gymnasium (855); Orono, ME |
| February 8, 2024; 7:00 p.m., ESPN+ | | New Hampshire | W 85–66 | 15–9 (7–2) | Chace Athletic Center (924); Smithfield, RI |
| February 10, 2024; 2:00 p.m., ESPN+ | | at Binghamton | W 70–69 | 16–9 (8–2) | Binghamton University Events Center (2,831); Vestal, NY |
| February 15, 2024; 7:00 p.m., ESPN+ | | Maine | W 77–72 | 17–9 (9–2) | Chace Athletic Center (1,001); Smithfield, RI |
| February 17, 2024; 4:00 p.m., ESPN+ | | UMass Lowell | L 77–86 | 17–10 (9–3) | Chace Athletic Center (1,022); Smithfield, RI |
| February 24, 2024; 7:00 p.m., ESPN+ | | at Vermont | L 48–65 | 17–11 (9–4) | Patrick Gym (3,000); Burlington, VT |
| February 29, 2024; 7:00 p.m., ESPN+ | | at UMass Lowell | L 67–89 | 17–12 (9–5) | Costello Athletic Center (703); Lowell, MA |
| March 2, 2024; 4:00 p.m., ESPN+ | | NJIT | W 101–82 | 18–12 (10–5) | Chace Athletic Center (777); Smithfield, RI |
| March 5, 2024; 7:00 p.m., ESPN+ | | Albany | W 83–79 | 19–12 (11–5) | Chace Athletic Center (669); Smithfield, RI |
America East tournament
| March 9, 2024; 2:00 p.m., ESPN+ | (3) | (6) Maine; Quarterfinals | W 84–58 | 20–12 | Chace Athletic Center (1,147); Smithfield, RI |
| March 12, 2024; 5:00 p.m., ESPN+ | (3) | at (2) UMass Lowell; Semifinals | L 70–77 | 20–13 | Costello Athletic Center; Lowell, MA |
*Non-conference game. ^{#}Rankings from AP poll. (#) Tournament seedings in parentheses. All times are in Eastern.
