= 2023–24 Towson Tigers men's basketball team =

American college basketball season

2023–24 Towson Tigers men's basketball
- Conference: Coastal Athletic Association
- Record: 20–14 (11–7 CAA)
- Head coach: Pat Skerry (13th season)
- Associate head coach: Pat O'Connell
- Assistant coaches: Parfait Bitee; Chris Conway
- Home arena: SECU Arena

2023–24 CAA men's basketball standings
	Conf.				Overall
Team	W		L	PCT	W		L	PCT
Charleston †	15	–	3	.833	27	–	8	.771
Drexel	13	–	5	.722	20	–	12	.625
Hofstra	12	–	6	.667	20	–	13	.606
UNC Wilmington	12	–	6	.667	21	–	10	.677
Towson	11	–	7	.611	20	–	14	.588
Delaware	10	–	8	.556	19	–	14	.576
Stony Brook	10	–	8	.556	20	–	15	.571
Monmouth	10	–	8	.556	18	–	15	.545
Campbell	8	–	10	.444	14	–	18	.438
Northeastern	7	–	11	.389	12	–	20	.375
Elon	6	–	12	.333	13	–	19	.406
North Carolina A&T	5	–	13	.278	7	–	25	.219
William & Mary	4	–	14	.222	10	–	23	.303
Hampton	3	–	15	.167	9	–	24	.273
† 2024 CAA tournament winner

The 2023–24 Towson Tigers men's basketball team represented Towson University in the 2023–24 NCAA Division I men's basketball season. The Tigers, led by 13th-year head coach Pat Skerry, played their home games at the SECU Arena in Towson, Maryland as members of the Coastal Athletic Association (CAA).

== Previous season ==
The Tigers finished the 2022–23 season 20–11, 12–6 in CAA play, to finish as in a tie for third place with UNC Wilmington. As the No. 3 seed in the CAA tournament, they defeated Delaware in the quarterfinals before losing to No. 1 seed Charleston in the semifinals.

== Roster ==
2023–24 Towson Tigers men's basketball team
Players
Coaches

Pos.	#	Name	Height	Weight	Year	Previous school	Hometown
F	1	Tomiwa Sulaiman	6 ft 6 in (1.98 m)	215 lb (98 kg)	Jr	IUP	London, England
G	2	Jaiden Cole	6 ft 4 in (1.93 m)	165 lb (75 kg)	Fr	NBA Academy Latin America	Toronto, ON
F	3	Tyler Coleman	6 ft 7 in (2.01 m)	220 lb (100 kg)	Jr	Paul VI HS	Woodbridge, VA
G	4	Dylan Williamson	6 ft 1 in (1.85 m)	180 lb (82 kg)	RS Fr	Our Lady of Good Counsel HS	Upper Marlboro, MD
G/F	5	Christian May	6 ft 5 in (1.96 m)	210 lb (95 kg)	So	Bishop O'Connell HS	Edinburg, VA
G	10	Rahdir Hicks	6 ft 0 in (1.83 m)	180 lb (82 kg)	Jr	Malvern Prep	Coatesville, PA
G/F	11	Mekhi Lowery	6 ft 6 in (1.98 m)	200 lb (91 kg)	Fr	Oswego East HS	Bellwood, IL
F/C	13	Chase Paar	6 ft 10 in (2.08 m)	255 lb (116 kg)	GS	George Washington	Mount Airy, MD
G/F	15	Tyler Tejada	6 ft 8 in (2.03 m)	220 lb (100 kg)	Fr	Teaneck HS	Teaneck, NJ
G	20	Kordell Lewis	5 ft 10 in (1.78 m)	170 lb (77 kg)	Jr	Richard Montgomery HS	Rockville, MD
F	23	Marcus Watson	6 ft 6 in (1.98 m)	215 lb (98 kg)	RS Jr	North Carolina A&T	Buford, GA
G	24	Nendah Tarke	6 ft 4 in (1.93 m)	200 lb (91 kg)	RS Jr	Coppin State	Gaithersburg, MD
F	25	Messiah Jones	6 ft 6 in (1.98 m)	230 lb (104 kg)	Sr	Wofford	Chicago, IL
F	30	Cole Paar	6 ft 9 in (2.06 m)	235 lb (107 kg)	RS Fr	Glenelg Country School	Mount Airy, MD
F	32	Charles Thompson	6 ft 7 in (2.01 m)	250 lb (113 kg)	GS	St. Stephen's & St. Agnes School	Fort Washington, MD
G	33	Brandon Held	6 ft 3 in (1.91 m)	185 lb (84 kg)	RS Jr	Marriotts Ridge HS	Marriottsville, MD
G	45	Jackson Prince	6 ft 4 in (1.93 m)	200 lb (91 kg)	Fr	Westlake HS	Waldorf, MD

Head coach

- Pat Skerry (Tufts)

Assistant coach(es)

- Pat O'Connell (Johns Hopkins)
- Parfait Bitee (Rhode Island)
- Chris Conway (York College)
- John Auslander (Maryland)
- Caleb Kupa (West Chester)

Legend

- (C) Team captain
- (S) Suspended
- (I) Ineligible
- (W) Walk-on
- Injured
- Current redshirt

Roster
Last update: November 16, 2023

== Schedule and results ==
Date time, TV	Rank^{#}	Opponent^{#}	Result	Record	Site (attendance) city, state
Non-conference regular season
November 6, 2023*; 5:30 p.m., P12N		at Colorado	L 57–75	0–1	CU Events Center (6,078); Boulder, CO
November 9, 2023*; 8:00 p.m.		at Coppin State	W 70–49	1–1	Physical Education Complex (1,106); Baltimore, MD
November 13, 2022*; 7:00 p.m., FloHoops		Robert Morris	W 66–62	2–1	SECU Arena (1,903); Towson, MD
November 16, 2023*; 6:30 p.m., ESPN2		vs. No. 6 Houston; Charleston Classic quarterfinals	L 49–65	2–2	TD Arena; Charleston, SC
November 17, 2023*; 7:00 p.m., ESPNU		vs. Wake Forest; Charleston Classic consolation 2nd round	L 61–71	2–3	TD Arena (3,029); Charleston, SC
November 19, 2023*; 12:30 p.m., ESPN+		vs. North Texas; Charleston Classic 7th-place game	L 39–65	2–4	TD Arena; Charleston, SC
November 26, 2023*; 4:00 p.m., FloHoops		Morgan State	W 67–58	3–4	SECU Arena (1,613); Towson, MD
December 1, 2022*; 8:00 p.m.		at South Dakota State	L 48–61	3–5	Frost Arena (2,326); Brookings, SD
December 6, 2023*; 7:00 p.m., FloHoops		UMass	W 81–71	4–5	SECU Arena (1,802); Towson, MD
December 9, 2023*; 1:00 p.m., MASN		at UMBC	W 89–73	5–5	Chesapeake Employers Insurance Arena (2,513); Catonsville, MD
December 16, 2023*; 2:00 p.m., FloHoops		vs. Bryant; Holiday Hoopfest	L 93–101 ^{2OT}	5–6	UBS Arena; Elmont, NY
December 22, 2022*; 4:00 p.m., FloHoops		Nicholls	W 65–55	6–6	SECU Arena (2,011); Towson, MD
December 30, 2023*; 2:00 p.m., FloHoops		Arcadia	W 97–46	7–6	SECU Arena (2,624); Towson, MD
CAA regular season
January 4, 2024; 7:00 p.m., FloHoops		at Monmouth	L 43–51	7–7 (0–1)	OceanFirst Bank Center (1,484); West Long Branch, NJ
January 6, 2024; 2:00 p.m., FloHoops		UNC Wilmington	W 67–64	8–7 (1–1)	SECU Arena (1,832); Towson, MD
January 11, 2024; 7:00 p.m., FloHoops		Stony Brook	W 73–64 ^{OT}	9–7 (2–1)	SECU Arena (1,025); Towson, MD
January 13, 2024; 12:00 p.m., FloHoops		at Northeastern	L 59–67	9–8 (2–2)	Matthews Arena (1,015); Boston, MA
January 18, 2024; 7:00 p.m., FloHoops		at Charleston	W 82–78	10–8 (3–2)	TD Arena (4,858); Charleston, SC
January 20, 2024; 4:00 p.m., NBCSWA/FloHoops		Campbell	W 77–43	11–8 (4–2)	SECU Arena (2,108); Towson, MD
January 25, 2024; 7:00 p.m., FloHoops		Drexel	W 70–67	12–8 (5–2)	SECU Arena (2,804); Towson, MD
January 27, 2024; 2:00 p.m., CBSSN		at Delaware	W 67–56	13–8 (6–2)	Bob Carpenter Center (2,792); Newark, DE
February 1, 2024; 7:00 p.m., FloHoops		Northeastern	W 83–76	14–8 (7–2)	SECU Arena (1,950); Towson, MD
February 3, 2024; 6:00 p.m., CBSSN		at Hofstra	L 56–59	14–9 (7–3)	Mack Sports Complex (3,743); Hempstead, NY
February 8, 2024; 7:00 p.m., FloHoops		Delaware	L 62–74	14–10 (7–4)	SECU Arena (3,505); Towson, MD
February 12, 2024; 9:00 p.m., CBSSN		Elon	W 80–55	15–10 (8–4)	SECU Arena (2,112); Towson, MD
February 15, 2024; 7:00 p.m., FloHoops		at William & Mary	W 61–52	16–10 (9–4)	Kaplan Arena (2,352); Williamsburg, VA
February 17, 2024; 2:00 p.m., FloHoops		at Hampton	L 61–67	16–11 (9–5)	Hampton Convocation Center (2,421); Hampton, VA
February 22, 2024; 7:00 p.m., FloHoops		Monmouth	W 80–61	17–11 (10–5)	SECU Arena (1,910); Towson, MD
February 24, 2024; 12:00 p.m., CBSSN		Charleston	L 56–72	17–12 (10–6)	SECU Arena (4,322); Towson, MD
February 29, 2024; 7:00 p.m., FloHoops		at North Carolina A&T	W 84-58	18–12 (11–6)	Corbett Sports Center (2,953); Greensboro, NC
March 2, 2024; 7:00 p.m., FloHoops		at UNC Wilmington	L 64–75	18–13 (11–7)	Trask Coliseum (5,100); Wilmington, NC
CAA tournament
March 9, 2024; 2:30 p.m., FloHoops	(5)	vs. (13) William & Mary; Second round	W 67–56	19–13	Entertainment and Sports Arena (1,883); Washington, D.C.
March 10, 2024; 2:30 p.m., FloHoops	(5)	vs. (4) UNC Wilmington; Quarterfinals	W 66–56	20–13	Entertainment and Sports Arena (2,108); Washington, D.C.
March 11, 2024; 6:00 p.m., CBSSN	(5)	vs. (1) Charleston; Semifinals	L 56–61	20–14	Entertainment and Sports Arena; Washington, D.C.
*Non-conference game. ^{#}Rankings from AP poll. (#) Tournament seedings in parentheses. All times are in Eastern.
