= 2023–24 Vermont Catamounts men's basketball team =

American college basketball season

2023–24 Vermont Catamounts men's basketball

America East regular-season and tournament champions

NCAA tournament, first round
- Conference: America East Conference
- Record: 28–7 (15–1 America East)
- Head coach: John Becker (13th season)
- Associate head coach: Ryan Schneider
- Assistant coaches: Chris Santo; Nathan Johnson
- Home arena: Patrick Gym

2023–24 America East Conference men's basketball standings
	Conf.				Overall
Team	W		L	PCT	W		L	PCT
Vermont †	15	–	1	.938	28	–	7	.800
UMass Lowell	11	–	5	.688	22	–	10	.688
Bryant	11	–	5	.688	20	–	13	.606
New Hampshire	7	–	9	.438	16	–	15	.516
Binghamton	7	–	9	.438	15	–	15	.500
Maine	7	–	9	.438	15	–	17	.469
UMBC	6	–	10	.375	11	–	21	.344
Albany	5	–	11	.313	13	–	19	.406
NJIT	3	–	13	.188	7	–	21	.250
† 2024 AmEast tournament winner

The 2023–24 Vermont Catamounts men's basketball team represented the University of Vermont during the 2023–24 NCAA Division I men's basketball season. The Catamounts, led by 13th-year head coach John Becker, played their home games at the Patrick Gym located in Burlington, Vermont as members of the America East Conference.

== Previous season ==
The Catamounts finished the 2022–23 season 23–11, 14–2 in America East play, to finish as America East regular-season champions. They defeated NJIT, Binghamton and UMass Lowell to win the America East tournament championship. As a result, they received the conference's automatic bid to the NCAA tournament as the No. 15 seed in the East region. There, they lost to Marquette.

== Roster ==
2023–24 Vermont Catamounts men's basketball team
Players
Coaches

Pos.	#	Name	Height	Weight	Year	Previous school	Hometown
F	0	Ileri Ayo-Faleye	6 ft 8 in (2.03 m)	210 lb (95 kg)	RS Jr	Rhode Island	Lebanon, PA
G	1	Aaron Deloney	6 ft 0 in (1.83 m)	170 lb (77 kg)	GS	Grant High School	Portland, OR
G	2	Sam Alamutu	6 ft 5 in (1.96 m)	215 lb (98 kg)	RS So	Rothesay Netherwood School	Ajax, ON
G	3	TJ Hurley	6 ft 5 in (1.96 m)	190 lb (86 kg)	So	The Rock School	Pelham, ON
F	4	Jackson Skipper	6 ft 7 in (2.01 m)	170 lb (77 kg)	RS Fr	Link Year Prep	Tulsa, OK
G	5	Brenton Mills	6 ft 3 in (1.91 m)	185 lb (84 kg)	GS	Bowling Green	Allen, TX
G	12	Shamir Bogues	6 ft 4 in (1.93 m)	190 lb (86 kg)	Jr	Tarleton State	Killeen, TX
G	13	Jace Roquemore	6 ft 5 in (1.96 m)	170 lb (77 kg)	GS	UC San Diego	Henderson, NV
F	14	Michael Mora	6 ft 6 in (1.98 m)	205 lb (93 kg)	Fr	Asheville School	Palo Alto, CA
G	15	Charlie Moore	6 ft 4 in (1.93 m)	185 lb (84 kg)	Fr	New Hampton School	Santa Monica, CA
G	20	TJ Long	6 ft 4 in (1.93 m)	195 lb (88 kg)	Jr	Fairfield	Rockville Centre, NY
F	21	Seth Joba	6 ft 9 in (2.06 m)	225 lb (102 kg)	Fr	Bridgton Academy	Orchard Park, NY
F	24	Matt Veretto	6 ft 8 in (2.03 m)	220 lb (100 kg)	GS	Delaware	South Windsor, CT
G	25	Michel Ndayishimiye	5 ft 10 in (1.78 m)	180 lb (82 kg)	RS So	Rice Memorial High School	Burlington, VT
F	32	Nick Fiorillo	6 ft 8 in (2.03 m)	225 lb (102 kg)	GS	Scarborough High School	Scarborough, ME
F	34	Noah Barnett	6 ft 9 in (2.06 m)	205 lb (93 kg)	Fr	Don Bosco Prep	Poughkeepsie, NY

Head coach

- John Becker (Catholic)

Assistant coach(es)

- Ryan Schneider (Marist)
- Chris Santo (Saint Anselm)
- Nathan Johnson (St. Francis Xavier)

Legend

- (C) Team captain
- (S) Suspended
- (I) Ineligible
- (W) Walk-on
- Injured
- Current redshirt

Roster
Last update: November 11, 2023

== Schedule and results ==
Date time, TV	Rank^{#}	Opponent^{#}	Result	Record	Site (attendance) city, state
Exhibition
October 28, 2023*; 1:00 p.m.		Catholic	W 85–59	–	Patrick Gym; Burlington, VT
November 1, 2023*; 7:00 p.m.		Saint Michael's	W 65–47	–	Patrick Gym; Burlington, VT
Non-conference regular season
November 6, 2023*; 7:30 p.m., ESPN+		Merrimack	W 67–55	1–0	Patrick Gym (2,077); Burlington, VT
November 11, 2023*; 7:00 p.m., ESPN+		Plattsburgh State	W 92–41	2–0	Patrick Gym (2,389); Burlington, VT
November 16, 2023*; 11:30 a.m., ESPNU		vs. Charleston; Myrtle Beach Invitational first round	W 73–64	3–0	HTC Center (1,154); Conway, SC
November 17, 2023*; 12:00 p.m., ESPN2		vs. Saint Louis; Myrtle Beach Invitational semifinals	W 78–68	4–0	HTC Center (1,126); Conway, SC
November 19, 2023*; 5:30 p.m., ESPN2		vs. Liberty; Myrtle Beach Invitational championship	L 61–71	4–1	HTC Center (1,228); Conway, SC
November 22, 2023*; 7:00 p.m., ESPN+		Vermont State–Johnson	W 106–57	5–1	Patrick Gym (1,855); Burlington, VT
November 25, 2023*; 8:00 p.m., ESPN+		at Bradley	L 70–79	5–2	Carver Arena (5,068); Peoria, IL
November 29, 2023*; 7:00 p.m., ESPN+		Dartmouth	W 64–53	6–2	Patrick Gym (2,080); Burlington, VT
December 2, 2023*; 7:00 p.m., ESPN+		Yale	W 66–65	7–2	Patrick Gym; Burlington, VT
December 6, 2023*; 7:00 p.m., NESN		at Northeastern	W 73–71	8–2	Matthews Arena (987); Boston, MA
December 9, 2023*; 2:00 p.m., ESPN+		Colgate	L 71–77	8–3	Patrick Gym (2,641); Burlington, VT
December 16, 2023*; 4:00 p.m., ACCN		at Virginia Tech	L 51–73	8–4	Cassell Coliseum (4,918); Blacksburg, VA
December 20, 2023*; 7:00 p.m., ESPN+		at Toledo	W 86–60	9–4	Savage Arena (4,031); Toledo, OH
December 22, 2023*; 1:00 p.m., ESPN+		at Miami (OH)	L 69–70	9–5	Millett Hall (1,186); Oxford, OH
January 2, 2024*; 7:00 p.m., ESPN+		at Brown	W 71–70	10–5	Pizzitola Sports Center (623); Providence, RI
America East Conference regular season
January 6, 2024; 2:00 p.m., ESPN+		Maine	W 65–58	11–5 (1–0)	Patrick Gym (2,704); Burlington, VT
January 11, 2024; 7:00 p.m., ESPN+		UMBC	W 77–72	12–5 (2–0)	Patrick Gym (2,052); Burlington, VT
January 13, 2024; 2:00 p.m., ESPN+		NJIT	W 76–55	13–5 (3–0)	Patrick Gym (2,434); Burlington, VT
January 18, 2024; 6:07 p.m., ESPN+		at Binghamton	W 82–62	14–5 (4–0)	Binghamton University Events Center (3,345); Vestal, NY
January 25, 2024; 6:30 p.m., ESPN+		at UMass Lowell	W 72–65 ^{OT}	15–5 (5–0)	Costello Athletic Center (957); Lowell, MA
January 27, 2024; 4:00 p.m., ESPN+		at Bryant	W 67–57	16–5 (6–0)	Chace Athletic Center; Smithfield, RI
February 1, 2024; 7:00 p.m., ESPN+		Albany	W 81–59	17–5 (7–0)	Patrick Gym (2,338); Burlington, VT
February 3, 2024; 2:00 p.m., ESPN+		Binghamton	W 62–49	18–5 (8–0)	Patrick Gym (3,000); Burlington, VT
February 8, 2024; 7:00 p.m., ESPN+		at NJIT	L 61–63	18–6 (8–1)	Wellness and Events Center (474); Newark, NJ
February 10, 2024; 1:00 p.m., ESPN+		at UMBC	W 72–70	19–6 (9–1)	Chesapeake Employers Insurance Arena (1,710); Catonsville, MD
February 15, 2024; 7:00 p.m., ESPN+		New Hampshire	W 70–54	20–6 (10–1)	Patrick Gym (2,375); Burlington, VT
February 17, 2024; 3:00 p.m., ESPN+		at Maine	W 68–57	21–6 (11–1)	Memorial Gymnasium (940); Orono, ME
February 22, 2024; 7:00 p.m., ESPN+		at Albany	W 94–80	22–6 (12–1)	Broadview Center (2,541); Albany, NY
February 24, 2024; 7:00 p.m., ESPN+		Bryant	W 65–48	23–6 (13–1)	Patrick Gym (3,000); Burlington, VT
March 2, 2024; 4:30 p.m., ESPN+		UMass Lowell	W 74–62	24–6 (14–1)	Patrick Gym (3,015); Burlington, VT
March 5, 2024; 7:00 p.m., ESPN+		at New Hampshire	W 68–64	25–6 (15–1)	Lundholm Gym (776); Durham, NH
America East tournament
March 9, 2024; 3:00 p.m., ESPN+	(1)	(8) Albany; Quarterfinals	W 75–72	26–6	Patrick Gym (2,692); Burlington, VT
March 12, 2024; 5:00 p.m., ESPN+	(1)	(4) New Hampshire; Semifinals	W 66–59	27–6	Patrick Gym (2,487); Burlington, VT
March 16, 2024; 11:00 a.m., ESPN2	(1)	(2) UMass Lowell; Championship	W 66–61	28–6	Patrick Gym (3,000); Burlington, VT
NCAA tournament
March 22, 2024; 7:10 p.m., CBS	(13 S)	vs. (4 S) No. 13 Duke; First round	L 47–64	28–7	Barclays Center; Brooklyn, NY
*Non-conference game. ^{#}Rankings from AP poll. (#) Tournament seedings in parentheses. S=South region. All times are in Eastern.
