= ProA Young Player of the Year =

The ProA Young Player of the Year Award is an award that is handed out to the best young player (under-22) of a given ProA season. The ProA is the second highest basketball division of Germany. The award was first handed out in the inaugural 2007–08 ProA season, to Per Günther of Phoenix Hagen.

== Winners ==
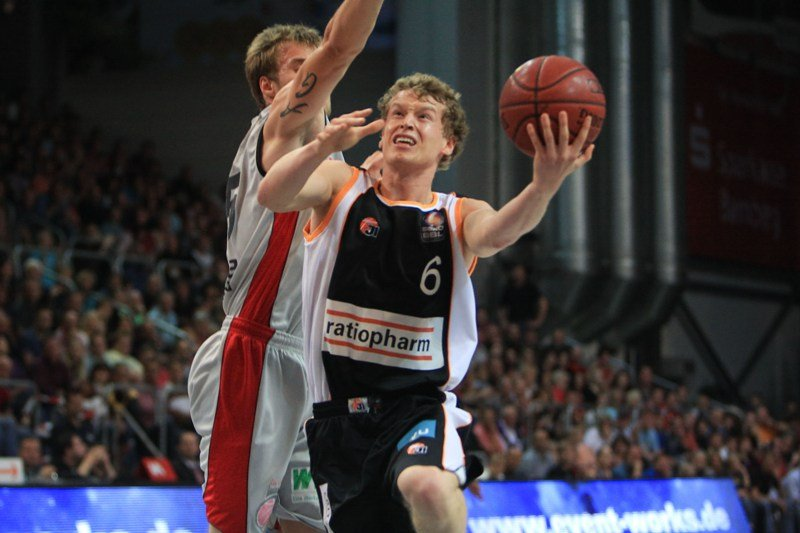
Per Günther was the inaugural winner

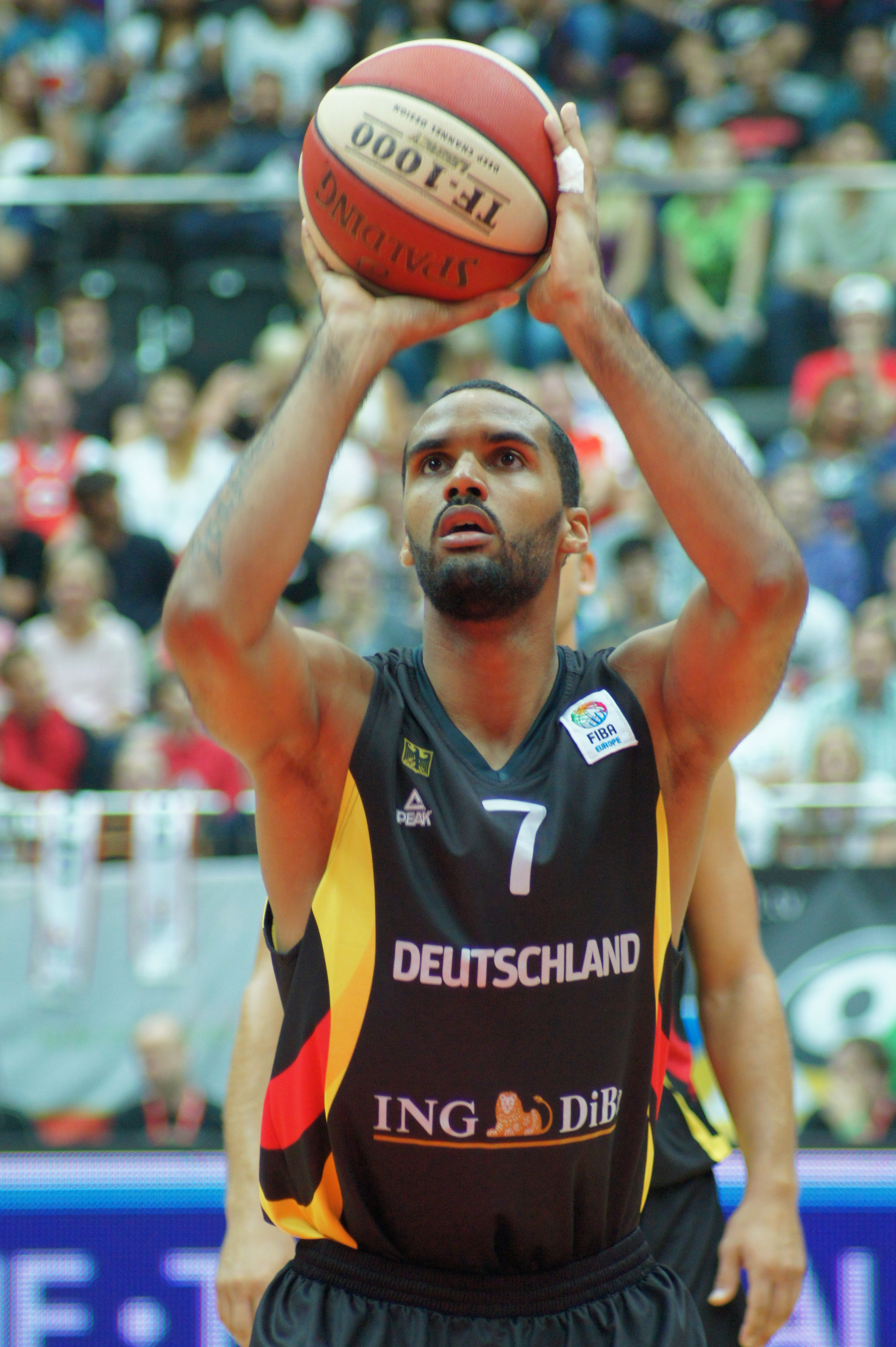
Akeem Vargas won the award in 2013

| ^ | Denotes player who is still active in the ProA |
| * | Inducted into the FIBA Hall of Fame |
| † | Denotes player whose team won championship that year |
| Player (X) | Denotes the number of times the player has received the award |

| Season | Player | Position | Nationality | Club | Ref. |
|---|---|---|---|---|---|
| 2007–08 | Per Günther | Guard | Germany | Phoenix Hagen | |
| 2008–09 | Johannes Lischka | | Germany | LTi Lich | |
| 2009–10 | Simon Schmitz | | Germany | Science City Jena | |
| 2010–11 | Bastian Doreth | Guard | Germany | Bayern Munich | |
| 2011–12 | Jusuf El-Domiaty | Guard | Germany | Cuxhaven BasCats | |
| 2012–13 | Akeem Vargas | Guard | Germany | Göttingen | |
| 2013–14 | Stephan Haukohl | Forward | Germany | Ehingen Urspring | |
| 2014–15 | Besnik Bekteshi | Guard | Germany (Note: Bekteshi, born in Ferizaj, Serbia, also owns the Albanian nationality. He represents Germany in international competitions.) | Gießen 46ers | |
| 2015–16 | Johannes Thiemann | Forward/center | Germany | Baunach Young Pikes | |
| 2016–17 | Jonas Richter | Forward | Germany | Niners Chemnitz | |
| 2017–18 | William McDowell-White | Guard | Australia | Baunach Young Pikes | |
| 2018–19 | Justus Hollatz | Guard | Germany | Hamburg Towers | |
| 2022–23 | Lorenz Bank | Forward | Germany | Phoenix Hagen | |
| 2023–24 | Jack Kayil | Guard | Germany | Rasta Vechta | |
| 2024–25 | Alexander Richardson | Center | Germany/Great Britain | ART Giants Düsseldorf | |
| 2025–26 | Lenny Liedtke | Forward | Germany | BBC Bayreuth | |
