= Jusuf El-Domiaty =

German basketball player (born 1990)

SC Langenhagen
- Position: Point guard / shooting guard
- League: Regionalliga West

Personal information
- Born: October 11, 1990 (age 36) Braunschweig, Germany
- Listed height: 1.87 m (6 ft 2 in)

Career information
- Playing career: 2006–present

Career history
- 2006–2011: SUM Braunschweig
- 2009–2011: →Phantoms Braunschweig
- 2011–2012: Cuxhaven BasCats
- 2012–2016: Eisbären Bremerhaven
- 2016–2017: Dresden Titans
- 2017–present: SC Langenhagen

Career highlights
- ProA Young Player of the Year (2012)

Jusuf El-Domiaty (born 11 October 1990, Braunschweig, Lower Saxony, Germany) is a German professional basketball player of Egyptian and Bosnian descent. El-Domiaty played initially successful in his hometown basketball and became a youth international. From 2011 to 2016 he played for Eisbären Bremerhaven, initially only the cooperation partner Cuxhaven BasCats second division ProA and since the 2012–13 season in the first division Basketball Bundesliga squad.

He currently plays for Dresden Titans of the German ProA.

== Professional career ==
El-Domiaty played in the youth teams of SG Braunschweig and by double license already from 2006 in the men's team Spot Up Media Baskets (SUM Baskets) in ProB. Having almost reached the U18 national team at the European Championship finals in 2008 against relegation in the group of 16 best European junior national teams, he played in the ProB 2008–09 mainly for SUM Baskets and came used only sporadically in the junior Basketball-Bundesliga. In the ProB 2009–10 he confirmed this with an operating time of almost 30 minutes and ten points per game and received first short minutes for the New Yorker Phantoms Braunschweig in the top-level basketball league. After not receiving more playing time in the following season, he decided to change clubs in 2011. Since El-Domiaty 2011 played in Bremerhaven. The BBL club Eisbären at first did send him to their partner club Cuxhaven BasCats from the second division ProA in the 2011–12 season, however.

In the ProA 2011–12 El-Domiaty was one of the strongest players and was called "Youngster of January 2012" Award and the end of the season as "Youngster of the Year" (the 2011–12 season). After using the double license already in the 2011–12 basketball league had three brief assignments with the polar bears in the top division, he was in the 2012-13 Basketball Bundesliga underwritten in the squad of Eisbären Bremerhaven.

- In June 2014, El Domiaty extended his contract with Eisbären Bremerhaven another season (2014–2015).
- In September 2015, he signed a 3-month contract with the team . and he was waived by the club in November 2015.
- In July 2016, he signed a contract with Pro A team Dresden Titans for the 2016–2017 season.
- In January 2018, he signed a contract with 2. Regionalliga West team SC Langenhagen for the rest of season.
