= ProA Player of the Year =

German basketball award

The ProA Player of the Year Award (German: ProA Spieler des Jahres) is a most valuable player award that is handed out to the best player of a given ProA season. The ProA is the second highest basketball division of Germany.

== Winners ==
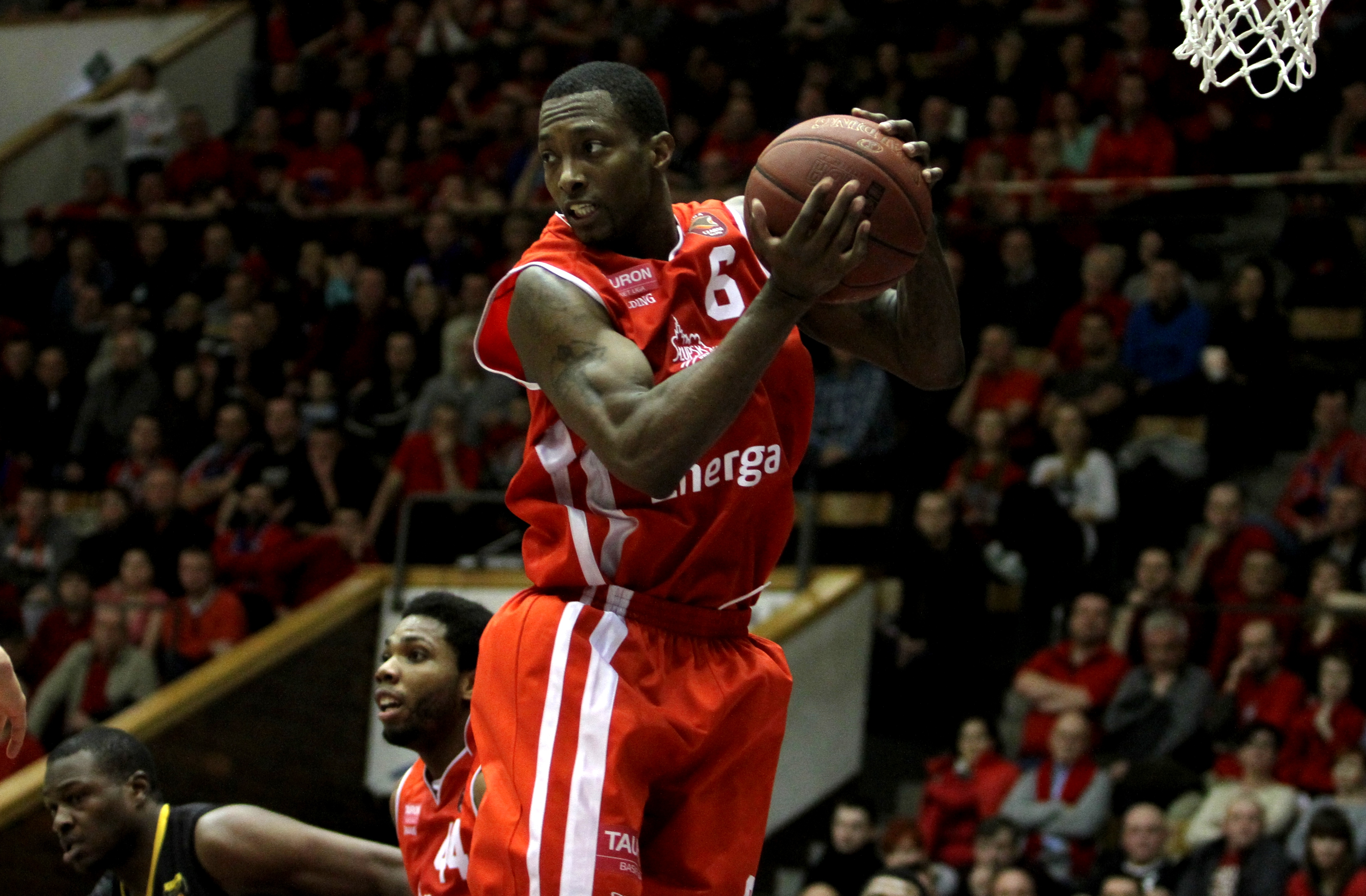
Roderick Trice was the inaugural winner

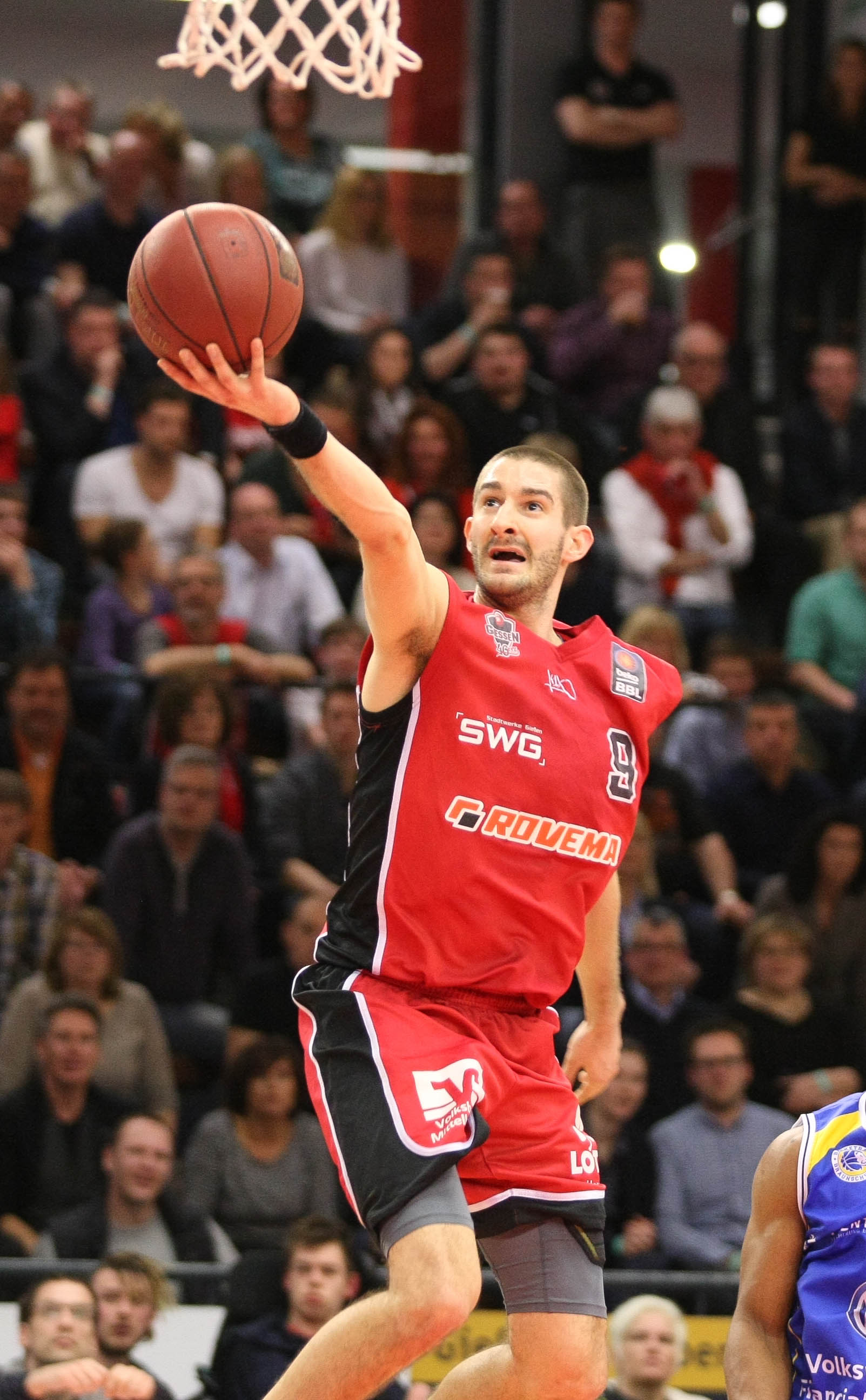
Braydon Hobbs won the award for the 2014–15 season

^	Denotes player who is still active in the ProA
*	Inducted into the FIBA Hall of Fame
†	Denotes player whose team won championship that year
Player (X)	Denotes the number of times the player has received the award

Season	Player	Position	Nationality	Club	Ref.
2007–08	Roderick Trice	Guard	United States	Cuxhaven BasCats	
2008–09†	Wayne Bernard	Guard	United States	Mitteldeutscher	
2009–10†	Jaivon Harris	Guard/forward	United States	Bayreuth	
2010–11	Lee Jeka	Guard/forward	Australia	s.Oliver Baskets	
2011–12†	Arizona Reid	Forward	United States	Mitteldeutscher	
2012–13†	Richie Williams	Guard	United States	Rasta Vechta	
2013–14†	Harper Kamp	Forward	United States	Göttingen	
2014–15	Braydon Hobbs	Guard	United States	Nürnberger	
2015–16	Christian Standhardinger	Forward/center	Philippines (Note: Christian Standhardinger, born in Munich, has German nationality as well but represents the Philippines internationally.)	Rasta Vechta	
2016–17	Leon Kratzer	Center	Germany	Baunach Young Pikes	
2017–18†	Seth Hinrichs	Forward	United States	Rasta Vechta	
2018–19	Malte Ziegenhagen	Guard	Germany	Chemnitz 99	
2019–20	Kendale McCullum	Guard	United States	Uni Baskets Paderborn	
2020–21	Haris Hujic	Guard	Germany	Bayer Giants Leverkusen	
2023–24	Michael Flowers	Guard	United States	Bozic Estriche Knights Kirchheim	
2024–25	Keith Braxton	Guard	United States	VfL AstroStars Bochum	
2025–26	Ben Burnham	Forward	United States	Artland Dragons	
