= Dennis Schröder =

German basketball player (born 1993)

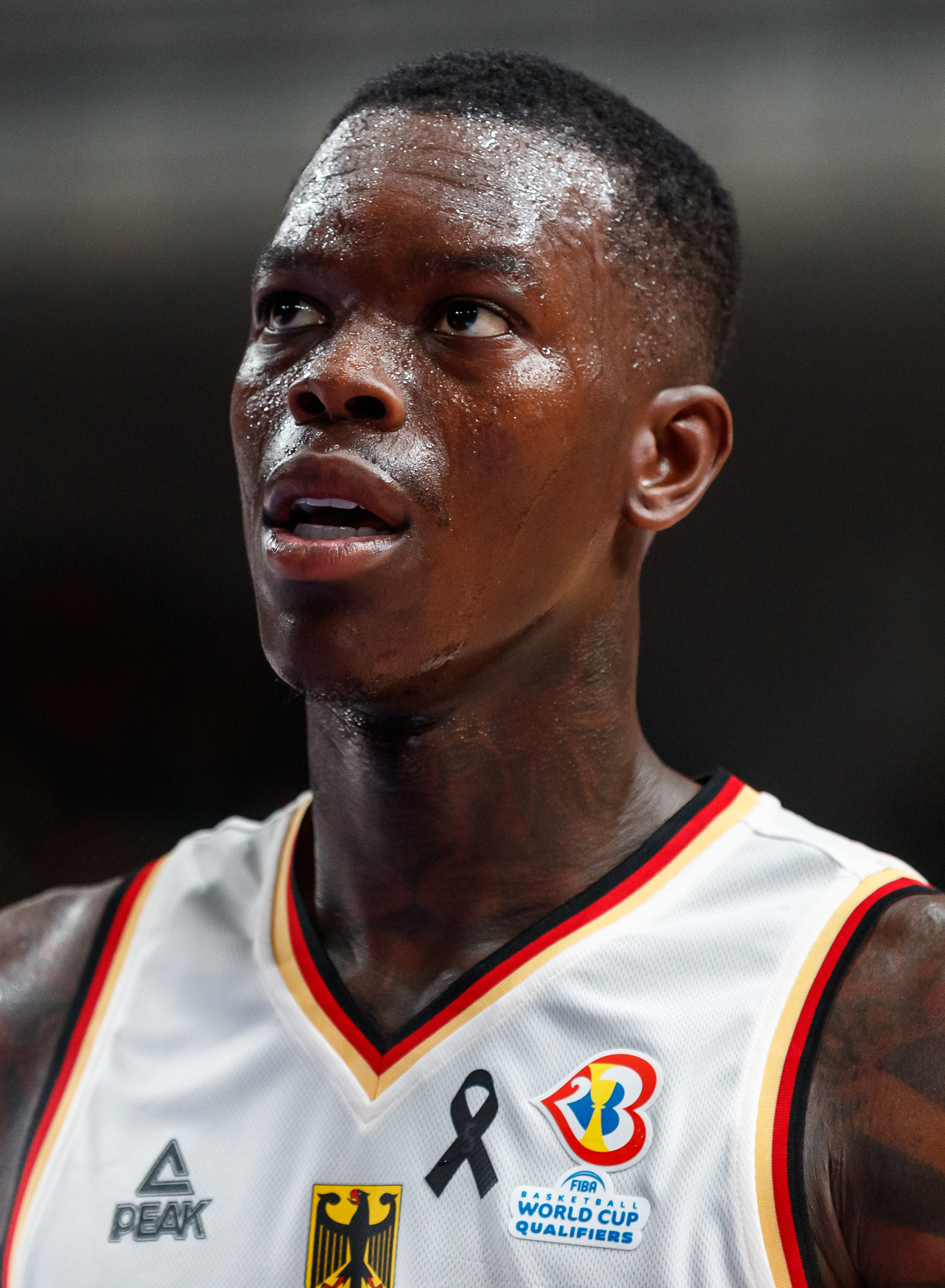
- Schröder with Germany in 2022

No. 17 – Charlotte Hornets
- Position: Point guard
- League: NBA

Personal information
- Born: 15 September 1993 (age 33) Braunschweig, Germany
- Listed height: 6 ft 1 in (1.85 m)
- Listed weight: 175 lb (79 kg)

Career information
- NBA draft: 2013: 1st round, 17th overall pick
- Drafted by: Atlanta Hawks
- Playing career: 2010–present

Career history
- 2010–2013: SG Braunschweig
- 2011–2013: Phantoms Braunschweig
- 2013–2018: Atlanta Hawks
- 2013: →Bakersfield Jam
- 2018–2020: Oklahoma City Thunder
- 2020–2021: Los Angeles Lakers
- 2021–2022: Boston Celtics
- 2022: Houston Rockets
- 2022–2023: Los Angeles Lakers
- 2023–2024: Toronto Raptors
- 2024: Brooklyn Nets
- 2024–2025: Golden State Warriors
- 2025: Detroit Pistons
- 2025–2026: Sacramento Kings
- 2026: Cleveland Cavaliers
- 2026–present: Charlotte Hornets

Career highlights
- FIBA World Cup MVP (2023); FIBA EuroBasket MVP (2025); Bundesliga Most Improved Player (2013); Bundesliga Best German Young Player (2013)
- Stats at NBA.com
- Stats at Basketball Reference
Medals
Men's basketball
Representing Germany
FIBA World Cup
Gold medal – first place	2023 Philippines–Japan–Indonesia
EuroBasket
Gold medal – first place	2025 Cyprus–Finland–Poland–Latvia
Bronze medal – third place	2022 Czech Republic–Georgia–Italy–Germany

Dennis Malik Schröder (/ˈʃruːdər/ SHROO-der; German pronunciation: ['denɪs ˈʃʁøːdɐ]; born 15 September 1993) is a German professional basketball player for the Charlotte Hornets of the National Basketball Association (NBA). He previously played for SG Braunschweig and Phantoms Braunschweig in Germany, before joining the Atlanta Hawks for his first five seasons in the NBA. He is the sole owner of his German hometown team, Basketball Loewen Braunschweig of the Basketball Bundesliga, and had been the majority shareholder of the team since 2018.

Debuting for the German national team in 2014, Schröder helped the team to its first major medal in 17 years when Germany won bronze at the 2022 EuroBasket. In 2023, he led the national team to their first World Cup title at the 2023 FIBA Basketball World Cup while being named the FIBA World Cup MVP. The following year, Schröder was the flag bearer for Germany along with judoka Anna-Maria Wagner at 2024 Summer Olympics in Paris. He helped Germany to a fourth place finish and was named to the FIBA Olympics All-Star Five team. In 2025, he led Germany to the EuroBasket 2025 title.

== Early life ==
Schröder is the son of an ethnic German father named Axel Schröder who played basketball in Gambia before meeting Schroder's Gambian mother Fatou, who gave birth to eldest brother Talha and the younger daughter Farida. Schröder has two elder half-siblings from Fatou's previous marriage before relocating to Germany. He and his brother were both heavily involved with skateboarding until he found basketball at age 11. He started focusing on the latter career after his father died in 2009, choosing to wear the jersey number 17 in his honor, as it was his favorite number. His agent was former German basketball national player Ademola Okulaja.

== Professional career ==
=== Phantoms Braunschweig (2010–2013) ===
Schröder started playing professional basketball in 2010 for SG Braunschweig, farm team of Phantoms Braunschweig. In his first season with SUM Baskets Braunschweig, he averaged 7.8 points, 2.1 assists and 1.6 rebounds per game in a second-tier German league. In the 2011–12 season he made a breakthrough, averaging 17.8 points and 6.7 assists over 23 regular-season games. His team went in the playoffs where he averaged 18.8 points and 5.1 assists over four games. In the same season, he also played 30 games for Phantoms Braunschweig of the German league, averaging 2.3 points, 0.7 assists and 0.8 rebounds in about 8 minutes per game.

In the 2012–13 season he played 32 games for Phantoms Braunschweig, averaging 12 points, 3.2 assists and 2.5 rebounds in 25 minutes per game. For the season, he was named the League's Most Improved Player as well as Best Young German Player.

In 2013, Schröder was announced to play at the 2013 Nike Hoop Summit for the World Select Team. Before officially playing at the Nike Hoop Summit, Schröder decided to declare for the 2013 NBA draft. On 20 April 2013, Schröder led his team to a 112–98 win. He finished with 18 points, 6 assists and 2 rebounds in 29 minutes.

=== Atlanta Hawks (2013–2018) ===
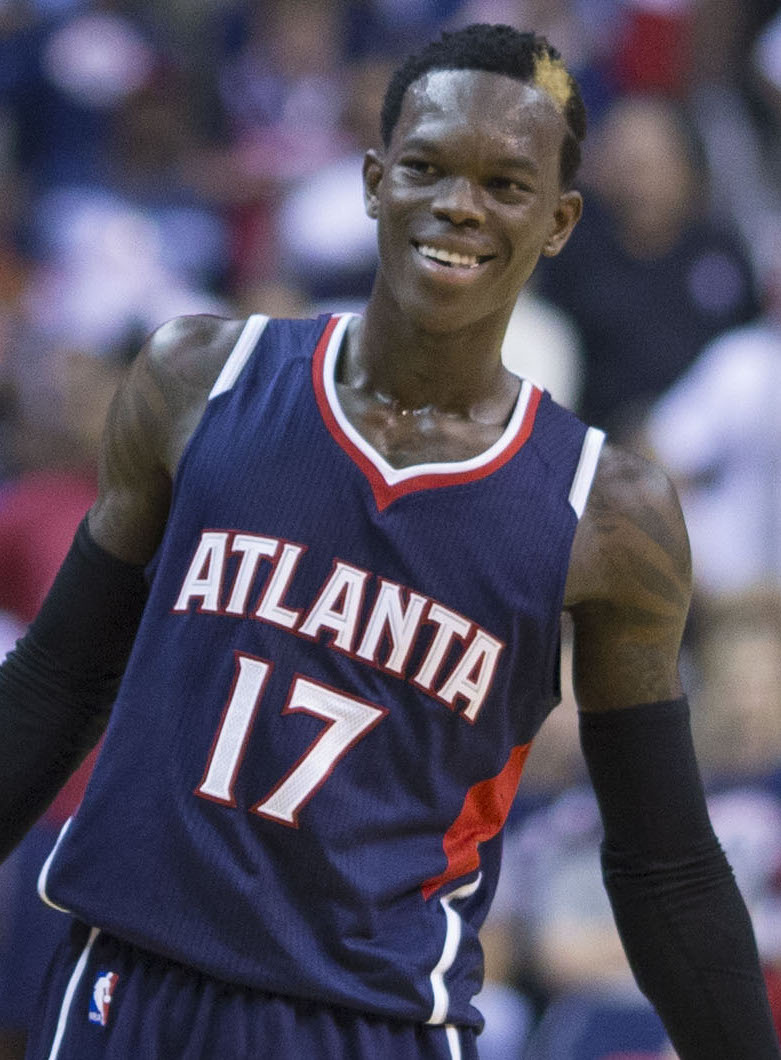
Schröder with the Hawks in 2015

On 27 June 2013, Schröder was selected by the Atlanta Hawks with the 17th overall pick in the 2013 NBA draft. On 11 July 2013, he signed with the Hawks. Schröder's minutes were cut due to frequent turnovers early in the season, with Shelvin Mack taking over the second-string point guard. He spent time in the NBA Development League in December, with the Bakersfield Jam, and finished his rookie season playing in just 49 games for the Hawks, with 3.7 points in 13.1 minutes per game.

On 22 December 2014, Schröder scored a career-high 22 points in a 105–102 win over the Dallas Mavericks. Schröder participated in the Rising Stars Challenge on 13 February 2015, recording 13 points, a game-high nine assists and three steals in Team World's 121–112 win over Team USA. His performance was lauded by ESPN analysts as looking like a "young Tony Parker". On 15 March 2015, he had 24 points and 10 assists in a 91–86 win over the Los Angeles Lakers. Schröder had a "breakout year" in 2014–15, increasing his averages to 10.0 points and 4.1 assists in 19.7 minutes per game, appearing in 77 regular season games with 10 starts.

Schröder continued to play behind All-Star Jeff Teague in 2015–16, making just six starts in 80 games. He averaged 11.0 points and 4.4 assists in 20.3 minutes per game, shooting 42% from the field and 32% from 3-point range, leading to defenders often daring him to shoot the three. On 20 February 2016, he recorded 25 points and 10 assists in a 117–109 overtime loss to the Milwaukee Bucks. In Game 1 of the Hawks' second round playoff series against the Cleveland Cavaliers, Schröder scored a playoff career-high 27 points in a 104–93 loss.

On 26 October 2016, Schröder signed a four-year, $70 million contract extension with the Hawks. He took the reins as the Hawks' lead guard in 2016–17 following Teague's trade to the Indiana Pacers. On 8 November 2016, Schröder scored a then career-high 28 points in a 110–106 win over the Cleveland Cavaliers. On 30 November 2016, he scored 14 of his career-high 31 points in the fourth quarter of the Hawks' 109–107 loss to the Phoenix Suns. On 9 December 2016, he set a new career high with 33 points in a 114–110 win over the Milwaukee Bucks. In Game 5 of the Hawks' first-round playoff series against the Washington Wizards, Schröder led the Hawks with 29 points, making a career-high-tying five 3s, and 11 assists in a 103–99 loss.

On 23 December 2017, Schröder matched his career high with 33 points, including 27 in the second half, to help the Hawks beat the Dallas Mavericks 112–107. On 12 January 2018, he scored a career-high 34 points in a 110–105 loss to the Brooklyn Nets. On 20 March 2018, he set a new career high with 41 points in a 99–94 win over the Utah Jazz.

=== Oklahoma City Thunder (2018–2020) ===
On 25 July 2018, Schröder was traded to the Oklahoma City Thunder in a three-team deal involving the Hawks and the Philadelphia 76ers. In his first season in Oklahoma, he was positioned as the team's sixth man, coming off the bench behind superstar point guard Russell Westbrook. In his debut for the Thunder in their season opener on 16 October, Schröder recorded 21 points, eight rebounds, six assists and three steals in a 108–100 loss to the Golden State Warriors. On 7 November, he scored a then season-high 28 points in a 95–86 win over the Cleveland Cavaliers. On 21 November, he scored a season-high 32 points off the bench in a 123–95 win over the Warriors. On 1 February 2019, he scored 24 of his 28 points in the second quarter of the Thunder's 118–102 win over the Miami Heat. On 3 March, he recorded 17 points and a career-high 11 rebounds in a 99–95 win over the Memphis Grizzlies. His second season with the team saw him in the role of the sixth man yet again, this time behind veteran All-Star point guard Chris Paul and Shai Gilgeous-Alexander. Schröder led the league in scoring off the bench with 18.9 points per game, while shooting a career-high 46.9% from the field, including 38.5% on 3-point field goals. He finished as the runner-up to Montrezl Harrell in voting for the NBA Sixth Man of the Year.

=== Los Angeles Lakers (2020–2021) ===
On 18 November 2020, Schröder was traded to the Los Angeles Lakers in exchange for Danny Green and the draft rights to first-round pick Jaden McDaniels. On 22 December 2020, Schröder made his Lakers debut, putting up 14 points, 12 rebounds, and eight assists, in a 116–109 loss to the Los Angeles Clippers. At the end of March 2021, there were rumors that he rejected the Lakers' contract extension offer of four years, $84 million to pursue a larger deal in the off-season as an unrestricted free agent which he later clarified was not true. He was sidelined twice during the season due to the league's COVID-19 health protocols, including missing seven games late in the season. Schröder started 61 games during the regular season, averaging 15.4 points and 5.8 assists per games and shooting 43.7% shooting from the field and 33.5% on 3-pointers. His numbers dropped in the playoffs to 14.3 points and 2.8 assists while shooting 40.3% from the field and 31.9% from three-point range, and the Lakers were eliminated in six games by Phoenix. During the off-season, the Lakers traded for point guard Russell Westbrook, signaling that the Lakers would inevitably be moving on from Schröder.

=== Boston Celtics (2021–2022) ===
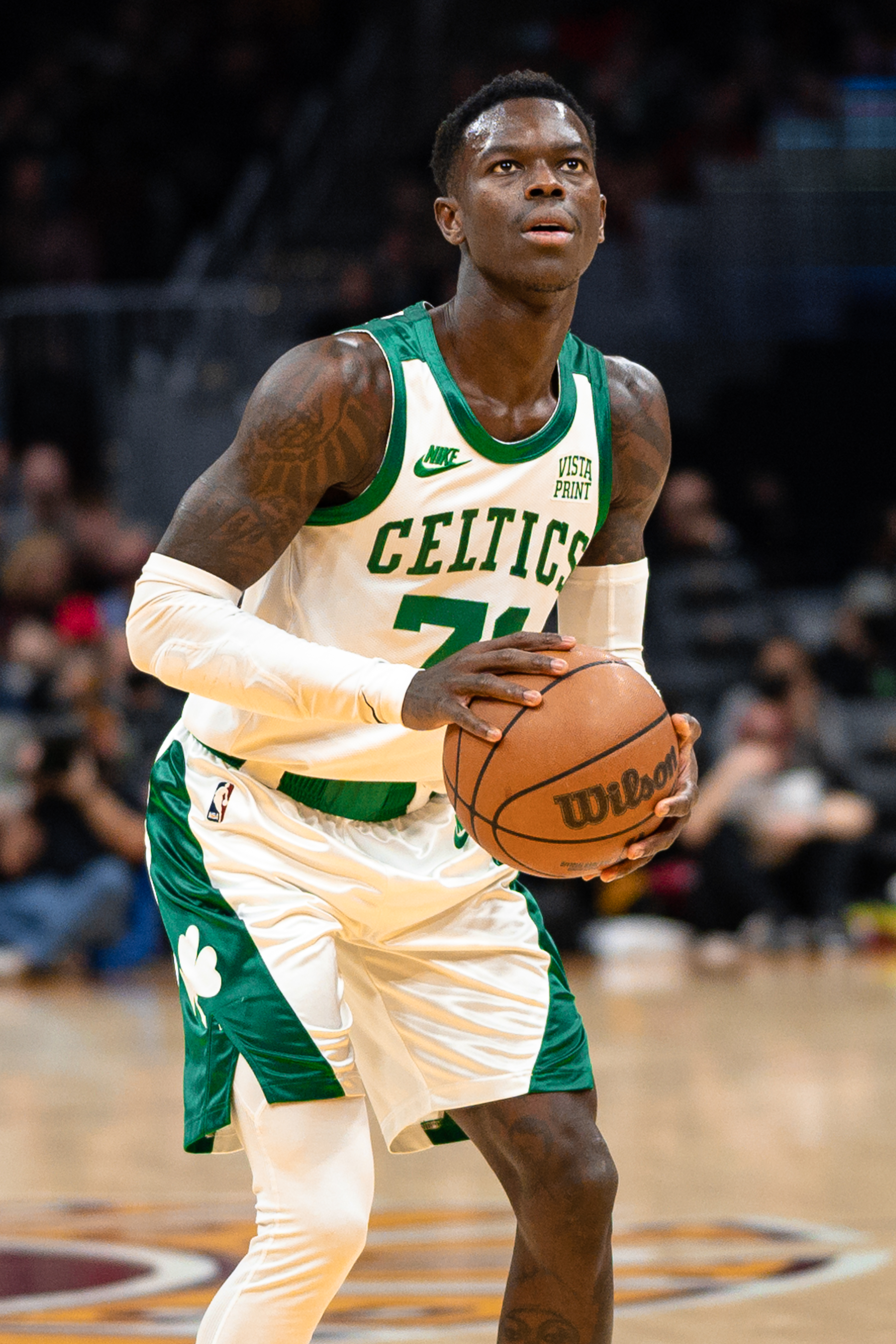
Schröder with the Celtics in 2021

On 13 August 2021, Schröder signed with the Boston Celtics, on a one-year, $5.9 million taxpayer mid-level exception contract. The Celtics, who had recently moved on from starting point guard Kemba Walker via trade earlier in the off-season, were in search of backcourt depth and Schröder fit the bill at a much-discounted price than his rumored $84 million contract extension with the Lakers during the 2020–21 season. Schröder chose to wear number 71 with the Celtics as his usual number 17 had been retired by the Celtics in honor of John Havlicek. He became only the fourth-known player in the history of the league to wear the number 71 and the first since McCoy McLemore in 1965.

=== Houston Rockets (2022) ===
On 10 February 2022, Schröder was traded, along with Enes Freedom and Bruno Fernando, to the Houston Rockets in exchange for Daniel Theis. On 29 March, Schröder was ruled out for the remainder of the season with a shoulder injury.

=== Return to the Lakers (2022–2023) ===
On 16 September 2022, the Los Angeles Lakers signed Schröder to a one-year, $2.64 million deal for his return to the team. Schröder chose the Lakers over the Toronto Raptors and Phoenix Suns citing "unfinished business" with the Lakers. After completing his first practice on his second stint with the team, he claimed during the media interviews that the Lakers never offered him a four-year, $84 million contract extension that he was eligible to sign during the previous free agency before the start of the 2021–22 NBA season.

Schröder scored 14 of his season-high 32 points in the fourth quarter to lead the Lakers to a 112–109 win over the Miami Heat during their regular season game on 4 January 2023. and on 20 January 2023, he put up 19 points, eight rebounds, eight assists, and made a game-winning layup in a 122–121 win over the Memphis Grizzlies.

Schröder was also a big factor in the Lakers struggling return to the playoffs after missing last year's playoffs. During their play-in game on 11 April 2023 against the Minnesota Timberwolves, Dennis scored 21 points on 41.7% field goal shooting, along with 75% three-point shooting, including a tie-breaking corner three-point shot in regulation and the winning two free throws in overtime, clinching the 7th seed in the Western Conference and successfully securing a spot in the 2023 NBA playoffs.

=== Toronto Raptors (2023–2024) ===
On 30 June 2023, Schröder signed a two-year, $26 million contract with the Toronto Raptors. The deal took up Toronto's entire mid-level exception allowing the organization about $8.7 million below the luxury tax threshold. It was Dennis' sixth team as he entered his tenth season in the NBA.

On 25 October 2023, Schröder made his Raptors debut, putting up 22 points and seven assists in a 97–94 win over the Minnesota Timberwolves.

On 13 December 2023, after a 135-128 win against the Atlanta Hawks, in which he had recorded 17 points, seven assists, and 3 rebounds, along with a block and a steal, Schröder achieved 10,000 career points.

=== Brooklyn Nets (2024) ===
On 8 February 2024, Schröder was traded alongside Thaddeus Young to the Brooklyn Nets in exchange for Spencer Dinwiddie. On 10 February, Schröder made his Nets debut, putting up 15 points and 12 assists in a 123–103 win over the San Antonio Spurs.

=== Golden State Warriors (2024–2025) ===
On 15 December 2024, Schröder was traded alongside a 2025 second-round pick to the Golden State Warriors in exchange for De'Anthony Melton, Reece Beekman, and three second-round picks.

=== Detroit Pistons (2025) ===
On 6 February 2025, Schröder was traded to the Detroit Pistons, who also acquired Lindy Waters III and a future second round pick, as part of a five team trade by the Warriors to acquire Jimmy Butler. On 21 April, during the first round of the playoffs, Schröder recorded 20 points and three assists in a 100–94 Game 2 win against the New York Knicks.

=== Sacramento Kings (2025–2026) ===
On 7 July, Schröder was traded to the Sacramento Kings in a sign-and-trade deal with the Detroit Pistons, signing a three-year, $44.4 million contract. The deal continued Schröder’s journeyman trajectory, as he joined his tenth team in twelve seasons. Schröder made 40 appearances (including 14 starts) for Sacramento during the 2025–26 NBA season, recording averages of 12.8 points, 3.1 rebounds, and 5.3 assists.

=== Cleveland Cavaliers (2026) ===
On 1 February 2026, Schröder was traded to the Cleveland Cavaliers in a three-team deal involving the Chicago Bulls, sending De'Andre Hunter to the Kings. On 2 April, during the fourth quarter of a game against the Golden State Warriors, Draymond Green shoved Schröder after the latter hard-fouled LJ Cryer by the back, causing both of them and coach Kenny Atkinson to receive a technical foul. Four days later, with James Harden out for a matchup against the Memphis Grizzlies, Schröder was inserted into the starting line-up and recorded a double-double, scoring 22 points and dishing out 11 assists en route to a victory.

=== Charlotte Hornets (2026–present) ===
On 20 August 2026, Schröder was traded to the Charlotte Hornets in a five-team deal. He made his debut for the team on 21 October, recording 19 points, four rebounds and six assists in a 110–103 win over the Brooklyn Nets.

== National team career ==
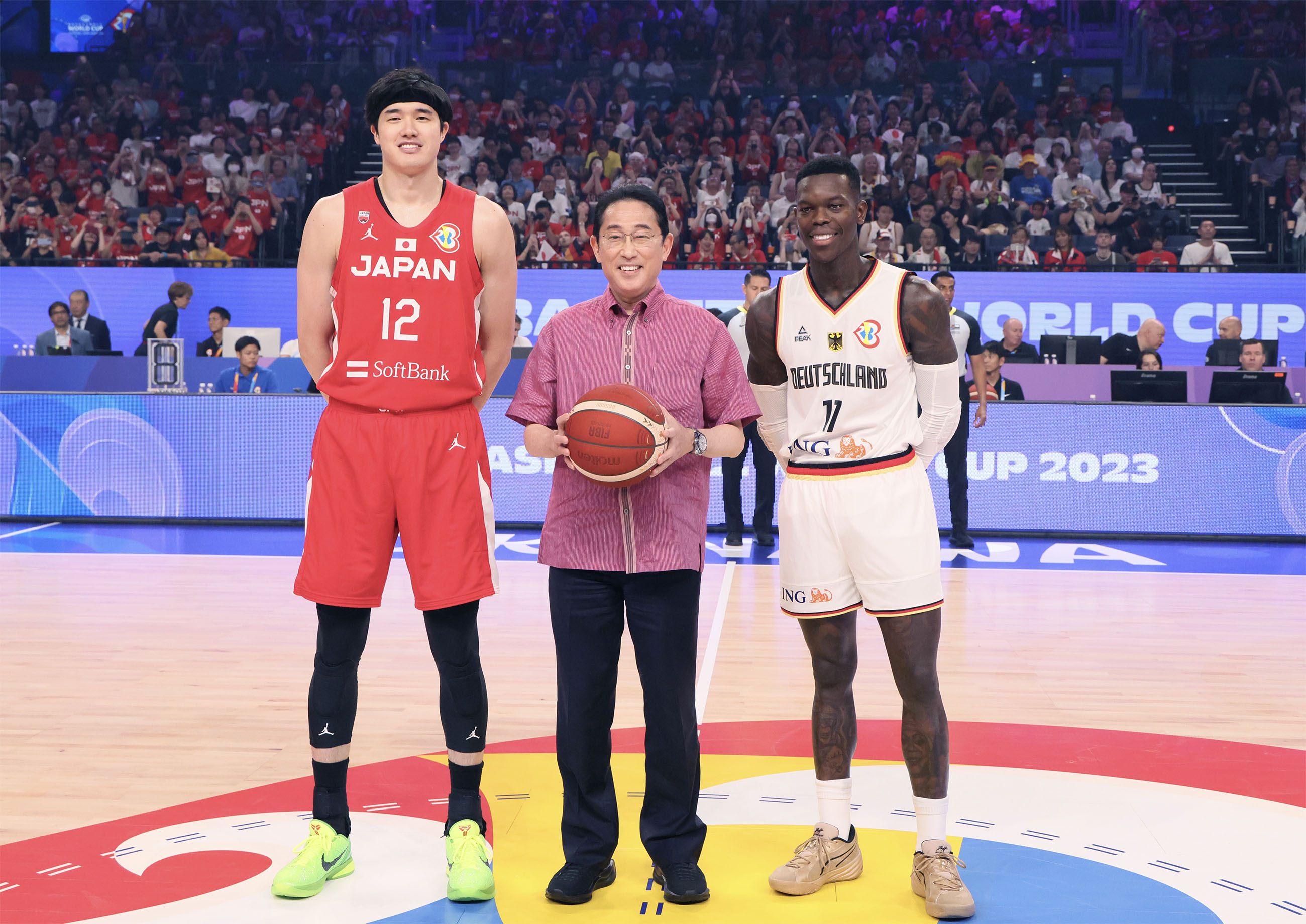
Schröder (right) with Germany alongside Japanese player Yuta Watanabe and Japanese prime minister Fumio Kishida in 2023

Schröder has been a member of the German national under-18 and German national under-20 teams. He played in the 2012 FIBA Europe Under-20 Championship and helped the German team to fifth place, averaging 6.1 points, 2 assists and 1.8 rebounds in 14.6 minutes on the court. On 27 July 2014, he made his debut for the senior Germany national basketball team in a game against Finland.

Schröder played at EuroBasket 2015, in the group stage that was hosted in Berlin. Germany did not qualify for the knock-out stage and finished on the 18th place in the final rankings.

He returned for EuroBasket 2017, leading Germany to the quarterfinals and averaging a team-high 23.7 points and 5.6 assists per game.

Schröder had expressed a desire to play for Germany at the 2020 Summer Olympics; however, the German Basketball Federation was unable to meet the financial insurance requirements.

He returned to EuroBasket 2022 and led Germany as captain to third place, being named to the EuroBasket All-Tournament Team in the process. The run included a famous win over Greece in the quarterfinals, which had Giannis Antetokounmpo on the roster. Schröder averaged team highs of 22.1 points and 7.1 assists per game.

Schröder led the German national team to their first World Cup title at the 2023 FIBA Basketball World Cup. The team went undefeated, defeating top-ranked teams such as Australia and the United States. After the final between Germany and Serbia, he was named FIBA World Cup MVP and to the FIBA Basketball World Cup All-Tournament Team, averaging 17.9 points and 6.7 assists per game.

At 2024 Summer Olympics in Paris, Schröder was the flag bearer for Germany along with judoka Anna-Maria Wagner. After going unbeaten in Group B and beating Greece in the quarterfinals, Germany lost to France, 69–73, in the semifinals. In the bronze medal game, Germany lost to Serbia 83–93. For his play, Schröder was named to the FIBA Olympics All-Star Five team.

Schröder had another successful tournament at EuroBasket 2025, as he led Germany to their first European title since 1993. He scored 16 points and had 12 assists in the final, which Germany won 88–83 over Turkey. Following the conclusion of the tournament, he was named the FIBA EuroBasket MVP following his averages of 20.3 points, 3.4 rebounds, 7.2 assists and 0.8 steals. He became the third German player to win the award, after Chris Welp in 1993 and Dirk Nowitzki in 2005.

== Awards and honors ==
Basketball Bundesliga

- Bundesliga Most Improved Player: 2013
- Bundesliga Best German Young Player: 2013

German Basketball

- Olympics All-Star Five: 2024
- FIBA World Cup gold medalist: 2023
- FIBA World Cup MVP 2023
- FIBA Basketball World Cup All-Tournament Team: 2023
- EuroBasket gold medalist: 2025
- EuroBasket bronze medalist: 2022
- FIBA EuroBasket MVP: 2025
- 2x EuroBasket All-Tournament Team: 2022, 2025

== Career statistics ==
Legend
GP	Games played	GS	Games started	MPG	Minutes per game
FG%	Field goal percentage	3P%	3-point field goal percentage	FT%	Free throw percentage
RPG	Rebounds per game	APG	Assists per game	SPG	Steals per game
BPG	Blocks per game	PPG	Points per game	**Bold**	Career high

=== NBA ===
==== Regular season ====
Year	Team	GP	GS	MPG	FG%	3P%	FT%	RPG	APG	SPG	BPG	PPG
2013–14	Atlanta	49	0	13.1	.383	.238	.674	1.2	1.9	.3	.0	3.7
2014–15	Atlanta	77	10	19.7	.427	.351	.827	2.1	4.1	.6	.1	10.0
2015–16	Atlanta	**80**	6	20.3	.421	.322	.791	2.6	4.4	.9	.1	11.0
2016–17	Atlanta	79	**78**	31.5	.451	.340	.855	3.1	6.3	.9	.2	17.9
2017–18	Atlanta	67	67	31.0	.436	.290	.849	3.1	6.2	**1.1**	.1	**19.4**
2018–19	Oklahoma City	79	14	29.3	.414	.341	.819	**3.6**	4.1	.8	.2	15.5
2019–20	Oklahoma City	65	2	30.8	**.469**	.385	.839	**3.6**	4.0	.7	.2	18.9
2020–21	L.A. Lakers	61	61	32.1	.437	.335	.848	3.5	5.8	**1.1**	.2	15.4
2021–22	Boston	49	25	29.2	.440	.349	.848	3.3	4.2	.8	.1	14.4
2021–22	Houston	15	4	27.0	.393	.328	.872	3.3	5.9	.8	.2	10.9
2022–23	L.A. Lakers	66	50	30.1	.415	.329	.857	2.5	4.5	.8	.2	12.6
2023–24	Toronto	51	33	30.6	.442	.350	.852	2.7	6.1	.9	.2	13.7
2023–24	Brooklyn	29	25	32.0	.424	**.412**	.797	3.5	6.0	.6	**.3**	14.6
2024–25	Brooklyn	23	23	**33.6**	.452	.387	**.889**	3.0	**6.6**	**1.1**	.2	18.4
2024–25	Golden State	24	18	26.2	.375	.322	.744	2.3	4.4	1.0	.1	10.6
2024–25	Detroit	28	8	25.2	.378	.302	.833	2.6	5.3	.5	.2	10.8
2025–26	Sacramento	40	14	26.4	.408	.343	.820	3.1	5.3	.8	.2	12.8
2025–26	Cleveland	30	3	21.4	.401	.290	.861	2.3	4.3	.8	.2	8.2
Career		912	441	27.1	.430	.341	.836	2.9	4.9	.8	.1	13.7

==== Playoffs ====
Year	Team	GP	GS	MPG	FG%	3P%	FT%	RPG	APG	SPG	BPG	PPG
2014	Atlanta	2	0	3.5	**1.000**	**1.000**	.000	1.0	.0	.0	.0	2.5
2015	Atlanta	16	0	18.1	.386	.235	**.857**	1.8	3.9	.6	.0	9.0
2016	Atlanta	10	0	19.1	.452	.343	.846	1.9	3.6	.4	.1	11.7
2017	Atlanta	6	**6**	**35.2**	.455	.425	.838	2.3	**7.7**	1.0	.0	**24.7**
2019	Oklahoma City	5	0	30.2	.455	.300	.722	3.2	3.4	.8	.0	13.8
2020	Oklahoma City	7	0	32.4	.404	.289	.800	**3.7**	3.6	.6	.1	17.3
2021	L.A. Lakers	6	**6**	32.7	.400	.308	.846	3.0	2.8	1.0	**.2**	14.3
2023	L.A. Lakers	16	3	26.1	.398	.333	.821	1.9	2.9	1.0	**.2**	7.4
2025	Detroit	6	0	27.3	.491	.476	.813	2.3	3.7	**1.2**	**.2**	12.5
2026	Cleveland	**17**	0	15.9	.381	.333	.792	1.5	2.4	.4	**.2**	5.5
Career		91	15	23.4	.420	.337	.819	2.1	3.4	.7	.1	10.7

== Personal life ==
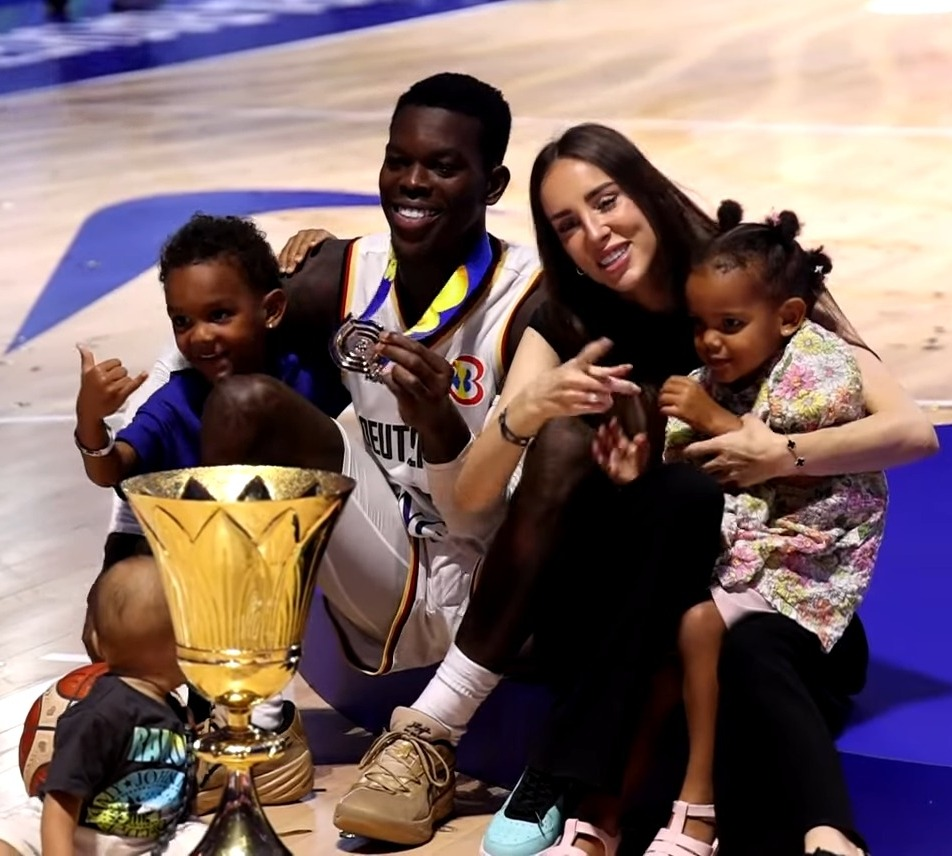
Schröder and his family

Schröder is married and has three children.

Schröder became known earlier in his career for his "signature" patch of bleached blonde hair which he adopted upon leaving Germany for the United States. It came at the suggestion of his mother who thought it would help people to recognize him in public.

Schröder is a devout Muslim. He prays before games and before going to sleep. Schröder is a teetotaler and has never consumed alcohol in his life.

Schröder missed games on two different occasions due to COVID-19 protocols in place. In May 2021, he said that he was the only Lakers player who had not been vaccinated against the virus.

After the Nets were eliminated from the 2024 playoffs, Schröder joined FC Germania Bleckenstedt soccer team of the German Landesliga Braunschweig.

Olympic Games
Preceded by Laura Ludwig; Patrick Hausding	Flagbearer for Germany; París 2024; With: Anna-Maria Wagner	Succeeded by Incumbent
