= Düsseldorf Baskets =

- Founded: 2008
- Dissolved: 2014
- History: See Names
- Arena: Turkish Airlines Arena; 3,670 seats
- Location: Düsseldorf, Germany
- Team colors: Turquoise, White

Düsseldorf Baskets was a professional basketball club based in Düsseldorf, North Rhine-Westphalia, Germany.

== History ==
The team was formed in 2008, when the Bayer company decided to dramatically decrease its sponsorship for its Bayer Giants Leverkusen. As a result, the Bayer Giants went down to Germany's Regional 1 (4th division) to restructure. The license for the Basketball Bundesliga was transferred to Düsseldorf, who chose to keep the name Giants. The tourism investment of Ozaltin Group, Gloria Hotels & Resorts became the main sponsor of Germany Beko Basketball League’s entrenched team Duesseldorf Giants. The name of the team was changed to "Gloria Giants" for the 2010-11 season. They ended on the 17th place in the 2009–10 season and relegated from the Bundesliga, but Gloria Hotels & Resorts invested more money in the club to get an immediate return to the first tier with a wild-card. The following season the team relegated again. In 2012 the club name was changed to Düsseldorf Baskets. After the 2012/2013 season the license of the team for playing in the second tier league in 2013/2014 was revoked by the ProA. Due to that the team did not take part in any competition in the 2013/2014 season. In March 2014 the team filed for bankruptcy.

== Names ==
- 2008–2010: Düsseldorf Giants
- 2010–2012: Gloria Giants Düsseldorf
- 2012–2014: Düsseldorf Baskets

== Results ==
Season	Tier	League	Pos.	Postseason
2008–09	1	BBL	12	–
2009–10	1	BBL	17	Relegated
2010–11	1	BBL	18	Relegated
2011–12	2	Pro A	6	Semifinalist
2012–13	2	Pro A	3	Runner-up
