= 2023–24 Charleston Cougars men's basketball team =

American college basketball season

2023–24 Charleston Cougars men's basketball

CAA regular season and tournament champions

NCAA tournament, First Round
- Conference: Coastal Athletic Association
- Record: 27–8 (15–3 CAA)
- Head coach: Pat Kelsey (3rd season)
- Associate head coach: Brian Kloman
- Assistant coaches: Michael Cassidy; Thomas Carr
- Home arena: TD Arena

2023–24 CAA men's basketball standings
	Conf.				Overall
Team	W		L	PCT	W		L	PCT
Charleston †	15	–	3	.833	27	–	8	.771
Drexel	13	–	5	.722	20	–	12	.625
Hofstra	12	–	6	.667	20	–	13	.606
UNC Wilmington	12	–	6	.667	21	–	10	.677
Towson	11	–	7	.611	20	–	14	.588
Delaware	10	–	8	.556	19	–	14	.576
Stony Brook	10	–	8	.556	20	–	15	.571
Monmouth	10	–	8	.556	18	–	15	.545
Campbell	8	–	10	.444	14	–	18	.438
Northeastern	7	–	11	.389	12	–	20	.375
Elon	6	–	12	.333	13	–	19	.406
North Carolina A&T	5	–	13	.278	7	–	25	.219
William & Mary	4	–	14	.222	10	–	23	.303
Hampton	3	–	15	.167	9	–	24	.273
† 2024 CAA tournament winner

The 2023–24 Charleston Cougars men's basketball team represented the College of Charleston in the 2023–24 NCAA Division I men's basketball season. The Cougars, led by third-year head coach Pat Kelsey, played their home games at TD Arena in Charleston, South Carolina, as members of the Coastal Athletic Association. They finished the 27–8, 15–3 in CAA play to win the regular season championship. The team defeated Monmouth, Towson, and Stony Brook to win the CAA tournament. As a result, they received the conference's automatic bid to the NCAA tournament as the No. 13 seed in the West region. There they lost in the first round to Alabama, a team that went on to that year's Final Four.

On March 28, 2024, head coach Pat Kelsey left the team to take the head coaching position at Louisville.

== Previous season ==
The Cougars finished the 2022–23 season 31–4, 16–2 in CAA play to finish tied for first place with Hofstra. The team defeated Stony Brook, Towson, and UNC Wilmington to win the CAA tournament, claiming the conference's automatic bid to the NCAA tournament. The team won 31 games before qualifying for the NCAA Tournament, a record for the school's Division I era.

This was the 6th NCAA tournament appearance in program history. As a No. 12 seed in the NCAA tournament's Southern region, they were defeated in the First Round by No. 5 seed San Diego State, a team that went on to upset No. 1 seed Alabama in the Sweet 16 and later played in the national championship game.

On November 20, 2022, the Cougars defeated the Virginia Tech Hokies in the Charleston Classic Championship game, winning the local tournament for the first time in program history. On January 2, 2023, the Cougars were ranked in the AP poll for the first time in 20 years. They remained ranked for four weeks, the earliest in any season that the Cougars have been ranked for multiple consecutive weeks.

== Offseason ==
=== Departures ===
Charleston departures
Name	Number	Pos.	Height	Weight	Year	Hometown	Reason for departure
Dalton Bolon	3	G	6'4"	205	GS	Gnadenhutten, Ohio	Graduated
Raekwon Horton	5	F	6'6"	200	SO	Santee, South Carolina	Transferred to James Madison
Ryan Larson	11	G	6'1"	180	GS	Saint Paul, Minnesota	Graduated
Pat Robinson III	15	G	6'3"	195	GS	Chesterfield, New Jersey	Graduated
Jaylon Scott	21	G	6'5"	195	GS	Allen, Texas	Graduated
Babacar Faye	35	F	6'8"	190	FR	Saly, Senegal	Transferred to Western Kentucky
Charles Lampten	42	F	6'11"	230	SR	Roanoke, Texas	Transferred to Western Carolina

=== Incoming transfers ===
Charleston incoming transfers
Name	Number	Pos	Height	Weight	Year	Hometown	Previous school	Years remaining	Date eligible
Frankie Policelli	1	F	6'9"	225	GS	New Hartford, New York	Stony Brook	1	October 1, 2023
Bryce Butler	4	G	6'5"	205	GS	Latrobe, Pennsylvania	West Liberty	1	October 1, 2023
Kobe Rodgers	11	G	6'3"	180	JR	Cincinnati, Ohio	Nova Southeastern	2	October 1, 2023
CJ Fulton	12	G	6'2"	190	JR	Belfast, Northern Ireland	Lafayette	2	October 1, 2023

=== 2023 recruiting class ===
College recruiting information
Name	Hometown	School	Height	Weight	Commit date
Mayar Wol; F	Hickory, NC	Moravian Prep	6 ft 8 in (2.03 m)	190 lb (86 kg)	Jun 12, 2022
Mayar Wol; F	Recruit ratings: Scout: Rivals: 247Sports: (79)				
James Scott; C	Fayetteville, NC	Seventy-First Senior	6 ft 10 in (2.08 m)	200 lb (91 kg)	Nov 9, 2022
James Scott; C	Recruit ratings: Scout: Rivals: 247Sports: (77)				
Overall recruit ranking:
Note: In many cases, Scout, Rivals, 247Sports, On3, and ESPN may conflict in their listings of height and weight.; In these cases, the average was taken. ESPN grades are on a 100-point scale.; Sources: "2023 Team Ranking". Rivals.

== Preseason ==
In the conference's preseason poll, the Cougars were picked to finish in first place.

Juniors Ante Brzovic (CAA Preseason First Team), Reyne Smith (CAA Preseason Second Team) and Ben Burnham announced that they would be returning to the team.

== Roster ==
2023–24 College of Charleston Cougars men's basketball team
Players
Coaches

Pos.	#	Name	Height	Weight	Year	Previous school	Hometown
G	0	Jordan Crawford	6 ft 2 in (1.88 m)	180 lb (82 kg)	Fr	North Mecklenburg HS	Charlotte, NC
F	1	Frankie Policelli	6 ft 9 in (2.06 m)	225 lb (102 kg)	GS	Stony Brook	New Hartford, NY
G	2	Reyne Smith	6 ft 2 in (1.88 m)	190 lb (86 kg)	Jr	Australian Institute of Sport	Ulverstone, Australia
G	3	Khalil London	6 ft 3 in (1.91 m)	185 lb (84 kg)	Fr	St. Dominic HS	Wyandanch, NY
G	4	Bryce Butler	6 ft 5 in (1.96 m)	205 lb (93 kg)	GS	West Liberty	Latrobe, PA
G	5	Evan Kilminster	6 ft 4 in (1.93 m)	180 lb (82 kg)	Fr	Australian Institute of Sport	Newcastle, Australia
F	10	Ante Brzovic	6 ft 10 in (2.08 m)	225 lb (102 kg)	Jr	Southeastern Oklahoma State	Zagreb, Croatia
G	11	Kobe Rodgers	6 ft 3 in (1.91 m)	180 lb (82 kg)	Jr	Nova Southeastern	Cincinnati, OH
G	12	CJ Fulton	6 ft 2 in (1.88 m)	190 lb (86 kg)	Jr	Lafayette	Belfast, Northern Ireland
F	13	Ben Burnham	6 ft 7 in (2.01 m)	220 lb (100 kg)	Jr	Carmel Christian School	Fort Mill, SC
F	15	Mayar Wol	6 ft 8 in (2.03 m)	185 lb (84 kg)	Fr	Word of God Christian Academy	Raleigh, NC
F	23	James Scott	6 ft 11 in (2.11 m)	210 lb (95 kg)	Fr	E.E. Smith HS	Fayetteville, NC
G	31	Jack Miller	5 ft 11 in (1.8 m)	180 lb (82 kg)	Jr	Ocean Township HS	Ocean Township, NJ
G	40	Frankie Idlett	6 ft 0 in (1.83 m)	185 lb (84 kg)	So	IMG Academy	Miami, FL
F	41	Spencer Legg	6 ft 6 in (1.98 m)	205 lb (93 kg)	So	Woodberry Forest School	Washington, D.C.
G	45	Dylan Ritter	6 ft 1 in (1.85 m)	185 lb (84 kg)	Jr	Zionsville HS	Zionsville, IN
F	50	Adam Comer	6 ft 19 in (2.31 m)	220 lb (100 kg)	Jr	Broome HS	Spartanburg, SC

Head coach

- Pat Kelsey (Xavier)

Assistant coach(es)

- Brian Kloman (Tennessee)
- Michael Cassidy (ACPE)
- Thomas Carr (Pfeiffer)

Legend

- (C) Team captain
- (S) Suspended
- (I) Ineligible
- (W) Walk-on
- Injured
- Current redshirt

Roster
Last update: October 9, 2023

== Schedule and results ==
Date time, TV	Rank^{#}	Opponent^{#}	Result	Record	High points	High rebounds	High assists	Site (attendance) city, state
Non-conference regular season
November 6, 2023*; 7:00 pm, FloHoops		Iona	W 71–69	1–0	16 – Brzovic	8 – Policelli	4 – Smith	TD Arena (5,265); Charleston, SC
November 10, 2023*; 6:00 pm, CBSSN		vs. Duquesne; Veterans Classic	L 72–90	1–1	14 – Rodgers	10 – Brzovic	4 – Fulton	Alumni Hall (2,340); Annapolis, MD
November 16, 2023*; 11:30 am, ESPNU		vs. Vermont; Myrtle Beach Invitational First Round	L 64–73	1–2	13 – Burnham	6 – Tied	2 – Brzovic	HTC Center (1,154); Conway, SC
November 17, 2023*; 2:30 pm, ESPNU		vs. Wyoming; Myrtle Beach Invitational Consolation 2nd Round	L 60–67	1–3	19 – Burnham	8 – Burnham	3 – Fulton	HTC Center (1,152); Conway, SC
November 19, 2023*; 1:00 pm, ESPN+		at Coastal Carolina; Myrtle Beach Invitational 7th Place Game	W 80–72	2–3	24 – Smith	11 – Brzovic	6 – Fulton	HTC Center (1,172); Conway, SC
November 26, 2023*; 5:30 pm, ESPN+		at Kent State	W 84–78	3–3	21 – Smith	7 – Butler	7 – Fulton	MAC Center (1,813); Kent, OH
December 1, 2023*; 6:00 pm, FloHoops		vs. Liberty; Field of 68 Tip-Off	W 76–67	4–3	18 – Burnham	6 – Tied	3 – Brzovic	Eleanor R. Baldwin Arena (526); Boca Raton, FL
December 2, 2023*; 6:00 pm, ESPNU		at No. 13 Florida Atlantic; Field of 68 Tip-Off	L 74–90	4–4	14 – Smith	9 – Brzovic	3 – Tied	Eleanor R. Baldwin Arena (3,161); Boca Raton, FL
December 10, 2023*; 2:00 pm, FloHoops		Rhode Island	W 85–70	5–4	23 – Burnham	5 – Tied	5 – Fulton	TD Arena (4,974); Charleston, SC
December 14, 2023*; 7:00 pm, FloHoops		The Citadel	W 86–71	6–4	15 – Policelli	9 – Brzovic	8 – Fulton	TD Arena (4,911); Charleston, SC
December 18, 2023*; 6:00 pm, FloHoops		Coastal Carolina	W 84–81	7–4	16 – Scott	10 – Rodgers	3 – Tied	TD Arena (4,993); Charleston, SC
December 21, 2023*; 7:00 pm, FloHoops		Saint Joseph's	W 89–82	8–4	31 – Smith	7 – Tied	8 – Fulton	TD Arena (4,854); Charleston, SC
December 29, 2023*; 7:00 pm, FloHoops		Montreat	W 96–59	9–4	19 – Burnham	8 – Brzovic	4 – Tied	TD Arena (5,027); Charleston, SC
CAA regular season
January 4, 2024; 7:00 pm, FloHoops		at Hofstra	W 73–61	10–4 (1–0)	18 – Butler	7 – Tied	8 – Fulton	Mack Sports Complex (1,412); Hempstead, NY
January 6, 2024; 6:30 pm, FloHoops		at Stony Brook	W 93–87	11–4 (2–0)	20 – Smith	6 – Policelli	6 – Brzovic	Island Federal Arena (2,416); Stony Brook, NY
January 11, 2024; 7:00 pm, FloHoops		Elon	W 80–62	12–4 (3–0)	20 – Tied	8 – Tied	5 – Brzovic	TD Arena (4,679); Charleston, SC
January 13, 2024; 4:30 pm, FloHoops		Monmouth; Hall of Fame	W 94–83	13–4 (4–0)	19 – Rodgers	12 – Brzovic	6 – Tied	TD Arena (4,790); Charleston, SC
January 18, 2024; 7:00 pm, FloHoops		Towson	L 78–82	13–5 (4–1)	24 – Rodgers	9 – Brzovic	1 – Tied	TD Arena (4,858); Charleston, SC
January 20, 2024; 7:00 pm, CBSSN		at UNC Wilmington	L 69–78	13–6 (4–2)	27 – Brzovic	11 – Brzovic	5 – Fulton	Trask Coliseum (5,100); Wilmington, NC
January 25, 2024; 7:00 pm, FloHoops		at Hampton	W 107–86	14–6 (5–2)	31 – Brzovic	12 – Brzovic	7 – Fulton	Hampton Convocation Center (897); Hampton, VA
January 27, 2024; 2:00 pm, FloHoops		at Campbell	W 90–67	15–6 (6–2)	16 – Burnham	6 – Policelli	3 – Tied	Gore Arena (1,617); Buies Creek, NC
February 1, 2024; 7:00 pm, FloHoops		UNC Wilmington	L 74–80	15–7 (6–3)	20 – Rodgers	9 – Policelli	5 – Fulton	TD Arena (5,021); Charleston, SC
February 3, 2024; 2:00 pm, FloHoops		at William & Mary	W 84–83	16–7 (7–3)	20 – Burnham	7 – Burnham	5 – Brzovic	Kaplan Arena (5,062); Williamsburg, VA
February 8, 2024; 8:00 pm, CBSSN		North Carolina A&T	W 80–58	17–7 (8–3)	21 – Burnham	16 – Policelli	5 – Fulton	TD Arena (4,624); Charleston, SC
February 10, 2024; 3:30 pm, FloHoops		Drexel; Black Out	W 80–70	18–7 (9–3)	22 – Policelli	5 – Tied	3 – Tied	TD Arena (4,750); Charleston, SC
February 15, 2024; 7:00 pm, FloHoops		at Northeastern	W 77–73	19–7 (10–3)	21 – Smith	6 – Tied	4 – Fulton	Matthews Arena (1,127); Boston, MA
February 19, 2024; 8:00 pm, CBSSN		William & Mary	W 65–57	20–7 (11–3)	15 – Tied	12 – Brzovic	2 – Tied	TD Arena (4,517); Charleston, SC
February 22, 2024; 7:00 pm, FloHoops		at Delaware	W 90–71	21–7 (12–3)	20 – Rodgers	7 – Burnham	6 – Fulton	Bob Carpenter Center (2,191); Newark, DE
February 24, 2024; 2:00 pm, CBSSN		at Towson	W 72–56	22–7 (13–3)	17 – Policelli	5 – Rodgers	5 – Fulton	SECU Arena (4,322); Towson, MD
February 29, 2024; 7:00 pm, FloHoops		Campbell	W 96–73	23–7 (14–3)	32 – Smith	8 – Burnham	7 – Rodgers	TD Arena (4,905); Charleston, SC
March 2, 2024; 2:00 pm, FloHoops		Hofstra; Senior Day White Out	W 87–76	24–7 (15–3)	21 – Smith	7 – Policelli	8 – Rodgers	TD Arena (5,127); Charleston, SC
CAA tournament
March 10, 2024; 12:00 pm, FloHoops	(1)	vs. (8) Monmouth; Quarterfinals	W 83–59	25–7	16 – Burnham	9 – Brzovic	7 – Fulton	Entertainment and Sports Arena; Washington, D.C.
March 11, 2024; 6:00 pm, CBSSN	(1)	vs. (5) Towson; Semifinals	W 61–56	26–7	16 – Smith	6 – Brzovic	3 – Fulton	Entertainment and Sports Arena; Washington, D.C.
March 12, 2024; 7:00 pm, CBSSN	(1)	vs. (7) Stony Brook; Championship	W 82–79 ^{OT}	27–7	23 – Smith	7 – Burnham	6 – Fulton	Entertainment and Sports Arena (1,954); Washington, D.C.
NCAA tournament
March 22, 2024; 7:35 pm, TruTV	(13 W)	vs. (4 W) No. 19 Alabama; First Round	L 96–109	27–8	19 – Burnham	8 – Tied	4 – Rodgers	Spokane Veterans Memorial Arena; Spokane, WA
*Non-conference game. ^{#}Rankings from AP Poll. (#) Tournament seedings in parentheses. W=West. All times are in Eastern.

== Awards and honors ==
Conference honors
Honors	Player	Position
CAA Tournament Most Outstanding Player	Reyne Smith	G
CAA All-Tournament Team	Reyne Smith	G
CAA All-Tournament Team	Frankie Policelli	F
CAA All-Tournament Team	Kobe Rodgers	G
CAA Sixth Man of the Year	Bryce Butler	G
All-CAA First Team	Ante Brzovic	F
All-CAA Second Team	Reyne Smith	G
All-CAA Third Team	Ben Burnham	F
CAA All-Rookie Team	James Scott	F

Coaching honors
Honors	Coach	Position	Ref.
Coastal Athletic Association Men's Basketball Coach of the Year	Pat Kelsey	Head coach	
