= Christian Standhardinger =

Filipino-German basketball player

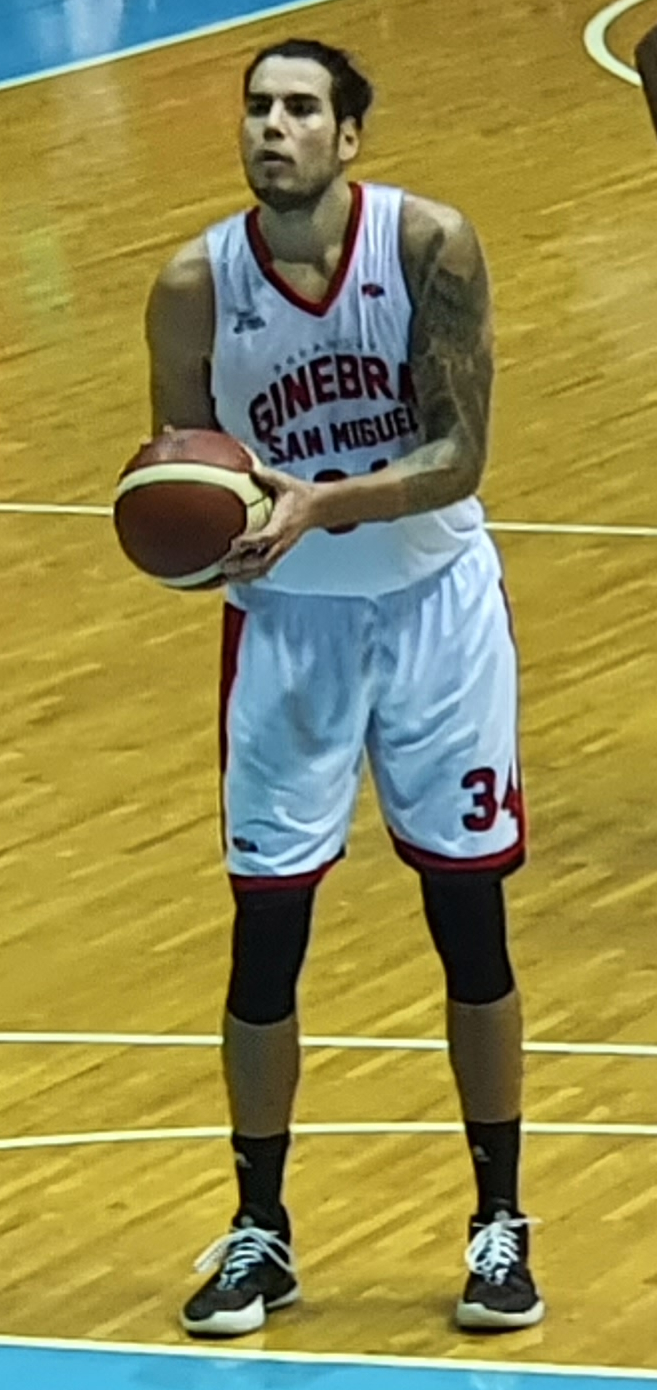
- Standhardinger with the Barangay Ginebra San Miguel in 2021

Free agent
- Position: Center / power forward

Personal information
- Born: July 4, 1989 (age 37) Munich, West Germany
- Listed height: 6 ft 8 in (2.03 m)
- Listed weight: 220 lb (100 kg)

Career information
- High school: Erdgas Ehingen (Ehingen, Germany)
- College: Nebraska (2009–2011); Hawaii (2012–2014)
- NBA draft: 2014: undrafted
- PBA draft: 2017: 1st round1st overall
- Drafted by: San Miguel Beermen
- Playing career: 2006–present

Career history
- 2006–2009: Ehingen Urspring
- 2014–2015: Mitteldeutscher BC
- 2015–2017: Rasta Vechta
- 2017–2018: Hong Kong Eastern
- 2018–2019: San Miguel Beermen
- 2019–2020: NorthPort Batang Pier
- 2021–2024: Barangay Ginebra San Miguel
- 2024: Terrafirma Dyip

Career highlights
- 4× PBA champion (2019 Philippine, 2019 Commissioner's, 2021 Governors', 2022–23 Commissioner's); PBA Finals MVP (2022–23 Commissioner's); 2× PBA Best Player of the Conference (2019 Governors', 2023 PBA Governors'); 2× PBA All-Star (2023, 2024); 3× PBA Mythical First Team (2019, 2023, 2024); PBA Mythical Second Team (2021); 2× PBA All-Defensive Team (2020, 2023); PBA All-Rookie Team (2018); ProA MVP (2016); BBL All-Star (2015); ProB Most Improved Player (2008); All-ProB First Team (2008)

Christian Karl Hermoso Standhardinger (born July 4, 1989) is a Filipino-German professional basketball player who last played for the Terrafirma Dyip of the Philippine Basketball Association (PBA). He has won four PBA championships, two PBA Best Player of the Conference Awards, and one PBA Finals MVP Award.

Born and raised in Germany, Standhardinger started his career in the 2. Basketball Bundesliga. He then moved to the United States to play college basketball for the Nebraska Cornhuskers and Hawaii Rainbow Warriors. After going undrafted in the 2014 NBA draft, he returned to Germany where he was named ProA Player of the Year during his stint with Rasta Vechta. He then played in the ASEAN Basketball League for Hong Kong Eastern.

In the 2017 PBA draft, he was selected first overall by the San Miguel Beermen, with whom he won the 2019 Philippine and Commissioner's Cups. He was then traded to NorthPort and was named Best Player of the Conference in the 2019 Governors' Cup. In 2021 he was traded to Barangay Ginebra San Miguel, winning the 2021 Governors' and 2022–23 Commissioner's Cups, and was named Finals MVP in the latter. He won his second Best Player of the Conference Award in the 2023 Governors' Cup.

Standhardinger represented the Philippines national team from 2017 to 2023. He played in the 2017 FIBA Asia Cup and 2018 Asian Games and won gold medals in three SEA Games (2017, 2019, and 2023). He also played in the 2018 FIBA 3x3 World Cup. Despite being born to a Filipino mother, Standhardinger is classified by FIBA as a naturalized player, since he acquired his Philippine passport after he turned 16 years old.

In 2024, Standhardinger married Denielle Magno in Palawan.

== Early life ==
Standhardinger was born on July 4, 1989, in Munich, in then West Germany to a Filipino mother. His mother, Elizabeth Santos Hermoso traces her roots to the town of Angono, Rizal. Growing up in Germany, Standhardinger's maternal grandfather, Boy Hermoso, who played in the Philippines' CYMCA basketball championship in the 1950s introduced him to the sport of basketball.

== College career ==
Standhardinger began his first 2 years of college basketball at Nebraska. During his freshman season, he had to sit out the first 15 games due to NCAA's ruling since he played for a professional team in Germany before heading to the United States for college. He averaged 8.1 points and 3.9 rebounds per game in 16 games as a freshman. During his sophomore year, Standhardinger was suspended by his coach Doc Sadler after playing only 6 games into the season for academic reasons. Standhardinger eventually left the team. He continued his junior and senior years playing for Hawaii.

== Professional career ==
=== Ehingen Urspring (2006–2009) ===
He started his professional career in the Erdgas Ehingen/Urspringschule in the ProA of 2. Basketball Bundesliga in 2006. He played for the Urspring until 2009.

=== 2014 NBA draft ===
Christian Standhardinger went undrafted in the 2014 NBA Draft making him an unrestricted free agent.

=== Mitteldeutscher BC (2014–2015) ===
Standhardinger signed a contract with Mitteldeutscher BC of the Basketball Bundesliga (BBL). In his first season, he was selected as a reserve for the BBL All-Star Game.

=== SC Rasta Vechta (2015–2017) ===
On 2015, Standhardinger returned to ProA and signed with the SC Rasta Vechta during offseason where he won his first MVP award.

=== Hong Kong Eastern (2017–2018) ===
Standhardinger signed a contract with Hong Kong Eastern of the ASEAN Basketball League as their Heritage import. On December 3, 2017, Standhardinger scored 40 points and pulled down 17 rebounds winning over Mono Vampire, 112–105.

=== San Miguel Beermen (2018–2019) ===
On October 29, 2017, Standhardinger was selected 1st overall in the 2017 PBA draft by the San Miguel Beermen. He missed the entire 2017–18 PBA Philippine Cup while he played out his contract with the Hong Kong Eastern in the Asean Basketball League. On May 9, 2018, Standhardinger played his first game with the Beermen during their 2018 PBA Commissioner's Cup opener against the Meralco Bolts. San Miguel lost the game 93–85. Standhardinger posted four points, five rebounds, two assists and two steals in his debut.

With his frequent use of brute strength and barreling plays toward the basket, he has been dubbed as "The Bulldozer".

=== NorthPort Batang Pier (2019–2020) ===
On October 14, 2019, Standhardinger was traded to the NorthPort Batang Pier in exchange for Moala Tautuaa.

=== Barangay Ginebra San Miguel (2021–2024) ===
On March 5, 2021, Standhardinger was traded to the Barangay Ginebra San Miguel in exchange for Greg Slaughter. On January 5, 2022, Standhardinger signed a three-year contract extension with Barangay Ginebra.

=== Terrafirma Dyip (2024) ===
On July 13, 2024, Standhardinger, along with Stanley Pringle and a 2023 first-round pick, was traded to the Terrafirma Dyip for Isaac Go, Stephen Holt, and a 2023 first-round pick. He played in six games for Terrafirma at the 2024 Governors' Cup before he was sidelined by an injury.

He did not play at the 2024–25 Commissioner's Cup. In November 2024, Terrafirma announced that Standhardinger is retiring from the PBA.

== Career statistics ==
=== PBA ===
Legend
GP	Games played	MPG	Minutes per game	FG%	Field-goal percentage
3FG%	3-point field-goal percentage	4P%	4-point field-goal percentage	FT%	Free-throw percentage
RPG	Rebounds per game	APG	Assists per game	SPG	Steals per game
BPG	Blocks per game	PPG	Points per game	**127**	Career high

As of the end of 2024–25 season

==== Season-by-season averages ====
Year	Team	GP	MPG	FG%	3P%	4P%	FT%	RPG	APG	SPG	BPG	PPG
2017–18	San Miguel	27	26.8	**.559**	.000	—	**.657**	9.3	1.5	.8	.3	16.1
2019	San Miguel	**58**	24.8	.541	.000	—	.639	6.9	1.4	.9	.2	12.3
2019	NorthPort	**58**	24.8	.541	.000	—	.639	6.9	1.4	.9	.2	12.3
2020	NorthPort	10	37.5	.494	**.333**	—	.494	**12.0**	3.8	**1.3**	.1	**19.9**
2021	Barangay Ginebra	36	35.3	.516	—	—	.531	9.4	2.6	.7	.1	14.6
2022–23	Barangay Ginebra	57	32.4	.558	.000	—	.474	8.7	4.0	.7	.2	15.3
2023–24	Barangay Ginebra	34	**38.9**	.505	.167	—	.513	10.2	**5.0**	.6	**.4**	19.2
2024–25	Terrafirma	6	34.8	.535	.000	—	.478	8.7	3.2	.8	.3	16.3
Career		228	31.5	.530	.105	—	.547	8.8	3.0	.8	.2	15.3

=== NCAA ===
Legend
GP	Games played	GS	Games started	MPG	Minutes per game
FG%	Field goal percentage	3P%	3-point field goal percentage	FT%	Free throw percentage
RPG	Rebounds per game	APG	Assists per game	SPG	Steals per game
BPG	Blocks per game	PPG	Points per game	**Bold**	Career high

Year	Team	GP	GS	MPG	FG%	3P%	FT%	RPG	APG	SPG	BPG	PPG
2009–10	Nebraska	16	—	15.4	.409	.375	.783	3.8	0.8	0.6	0.1	8.1
2010–11	Nebraska	6	—	17.7	.463	.000	.760	5.5	0.7	0.2	0.2	9.5
2011–12	Hawaii	32	—	30.1	.510	.333	.644	7.9	1.3	1.4	0.5	15.8
2012–13	Hawaii	31	—	31.9	.474	.277	.768	8.4	1.5	1.4	0.7	18.1
Career		85	—	27.1	.482	.301	.725	7.1	1.2	1.2	0.5	14.7

== National team career ==
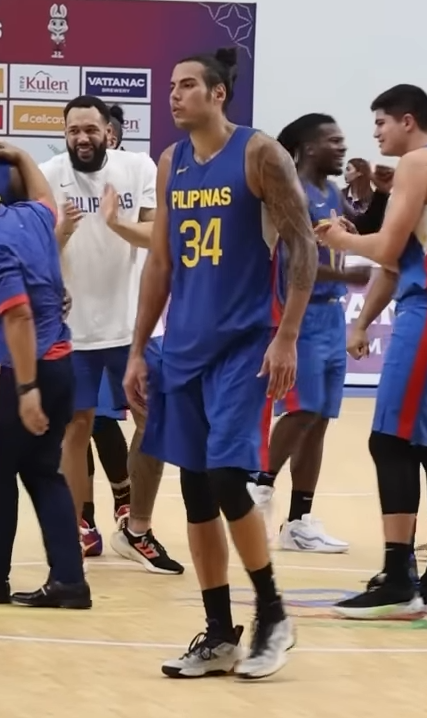
Standhardinger in 2023.

In 2007, Standhardinger played for the national under-18 team of Germany.

Standhardinger is eligible to play for the Philippines but only as a naturalized player since he acquired his Philippine passport after he became 16 years old. In June 2017, Standhardinger joined the national men's basketball team of the Philippines. He played with the team at the 2017 William Jones Cup and the 2017 FIBA Asia Cup.

After Andray Blatche pulled out for the 2017 FIBA Asia Cup due to security concerns over the militant situation in the host country Lebanon, Standhardinger replaced him as the Philippine team's naturalized player.

Standhardinger played with the Philippine team at the 2017 Southeast Asian Games in Kuala Lumpur, Malaysia. They won the gold medal after beating Indonesia 94–55, Standhardinger scored 11 points in the gold medal game.

In June 2018, Standhardinger suited up for the Philippines for the FIBA 3x3 World Cup which the country hosted despite a lingering knee injury. They finished the tournament at 11th place.

On August 5, 2018, Standhardinger was selected to be a part of the Philippine team for the 2018 Asian Games played between August 14 to September 1, 2018. They finished the tournament at 5th place.

Weeks after the 2018 Asian Games, Standhardinger suited up for the revamped Philippine team under Coach Yeng Guiao. On September 13, 2018, Standhardinger had 30 points and 12 rebounds against Iran for his FIBA World Cup Asian Qualifiers debut.

On May 20, 2023, Standhardinger announced his retirement with the national team after participating in the 2023 SEA Games which was considered his last game.
