= Per Günther =

German basketball player (born 1988)

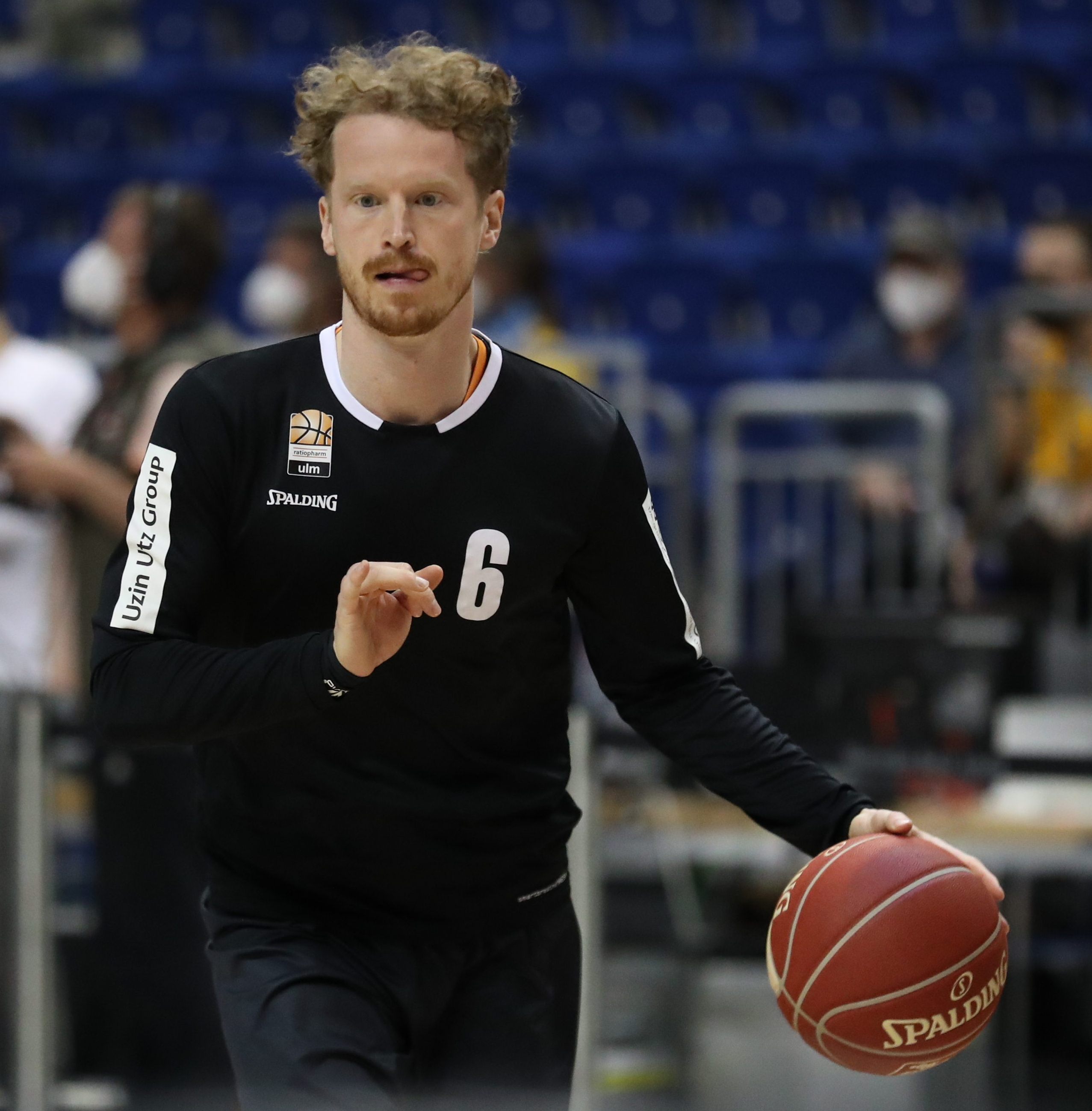
- Günther for Ulm in 2021

Personal information
- Born: 5 February 1988 (age 38) Hagen, West Germany
- Listed height: 6 ft 0.5 in (1.84 m)
- Listed weight: 175 lb (79 kg)

Career information
- Playing career: 2006–2022
- Position: Point guard
- Number: 6

Career history
- 2006–2008: Phoenix Hagen
- 2008–2022: Ratiopharm Ulm

Career highlights
- 8× BBL All-Star (2010–2017); BBL All-Star Game MVP (2016); ProA Young Player of the Year (2008); BBL Rookie of the Year (2009); 5x BBL Most Likeable Player (2012–2016)

Per Günther (born 5 February 1988) is a German former basketball player. He saw action in 500 games of the Basketball Bundesliga for Ratiopharm Ulm. He also competed with the German national basketball team at the 2010 FIBA World Championship. Günther is known as one of the best domestic players in Germany of his time, as he has played in eight BBL All-Star Games.

== Professional career ==
Born in Hagen, West Germany, Günther began his professional career with German side Phoenix Hagen, then a part of the German ProA (the second tier of German basketball). Günther had a highly successful 2007–08 season for Hagen, averaging 14.5 points and 2.4 assists per game. Following the season, he was named the league's Most Improved Player and was voted to the Eurobasket.com All-ProA Second Team.

On the heels of his successful season with Hagen, Günther joined Basketball Bundesliga (BBL) side ratiopharm Ulm for the 2008–09 season, helping the team to a fifth place league finish. In the 2009–10 season, he averaged 6.6 points and 2.5 assists for Ulm, although the team struggled to a 13th-place finish in the league.

On 9 January 2016, Günther participated in his sixth BBL All-Star game and he was named the BBL All-Star Game MVP. Günther retired in May 2022.

== International career ==
Günther was one of the top junior players in Germany. He first played with the German national basketball team at the 2004 FIBA Europe Under-16 Championship. He later competed with the junior squads at both the 2007 and 2008 FIBA Europe Under-20 Championship.

Günther's first major tournament as a member of the German senior national team was the 2010 FIBA World Championship in Turkey. He won a total of 65 caps for Germany's national team.

== Personal ==
His brother Jasper Günther has also been a successful basketball player.
