= Michael Flowers (basketball) =

American basketball player (born 1999)

No. 12 – Élan Béarnais
- Position: Point guard
- League: LNB Élite

Personal information
- Born: January 14, 1999 (age 27) Southfield, Michigan, U.S.
- Listed height: 6 ft 1 in (1.85 m)
- Listed weight: 190 lb (86 kg)

Career information
- High school: Southfield A&T (Southfield, Michigan)
- College: Western Michigan (2017–2020); South Alabama (2020–2021); Washington State (2021–2022)

Career history
- 2022–2023: VfL Kirchheim Knights
- 2023: Ottawa BlackJacks
- 2023–2024: VfL Kirchheim Knights
- 2024–2025: Antwerp Giants
- 2025: USC Heidelberg
- 2025–2026: Lietkabelis Panevėžys
- 2026: Petkim Spor
- 2026–present: Élan Béarnais

Career highlights
- BNXT League Second Team (2025); Second-team All-Pac-12 (2022); First-team All-Sun Belt (2021); Sun Belt Newcomer of the Year (2021); ProA Player of the Year (2024)

Michael John Flowers (born January 14, 1999) is an American basketball player for Élan Béarnais of the LNB Élite. He previously played for the Western Michigan Broncos, South Alabama Jaguars and the Washington State Cougars. He was named second-team All-Pac-12 with Washington State in 2022.

== High school career ==
Flowers played basketball for Southfield High School for the Arts and Technology in Southfield, Michigan. As a junior, he averaged 25 points, six rebounds and two steals per game. In his senior season, Flowers averaged 23 points, six assists and five rebounds per game. He was a two-time all-state selection in high school.

== College career ==
As a freshman at Western Michigan, Flowers averaged 3.4 points per game. On December 15, 2018, he scored a sophomore season-high 31 points and seven rebounds in a 70–62 loss to Michigan. As a sophomore, Flowers averaged 15.7 points, 3.9 rebounds and 3.3 assists per game. On March 9, 2020, he scored a career-high 35 points in a 76–73 loss to Toledo at the first round of the MAC tournament. As a junior, he averaged 16.9 points, 3.3 assists and 2.9 rebounds per game, earning All-MAC honorable mention. He entered the transfer portal following the departure of head coach Steve Hawkins at the end of the season.

For his senior season, Flowers transferred to South Alabama. He was initially denied a waiver for immediate eligibility by the NCAA. Flowers alleged that Western Michigan had given away his scholarship without his knowledge while he was in the transfer portal, and that inconsistent communication from its athletic department caused some programs to stop recruiting him and resulted in his ineligibility. Before the season, the NCAA reversed its decision and ruled him eligible. On March 5, 2021, Flowers posted a season-high 34 points, five rebounds and four assists in an 80–72 victory against Louisiana–Monroe at the first round of the Sun Belt tournament. As a senior, he averaged 21 points, 4.6 rebounds and 3.6 assists per game, earning First Team All-Sun Belt and Newcomer of the Year recognition.

Flowers opted to return to college for a fifth season of eligibility, granted due to the COVID-19 pandemic, and transferred to Washington State. He chose the Cougars over offers from Arkansas, USC, Miami (Florida), Texas A&M, Florida, Colorado, and Marquette. He was named second-team All-Pac-12.

== Professional career ==
=== VfL Kirchheim Knights (2022–2023) ===
After going undrafted in the 2022 NBA draft, Flowers signed with VfL Kirchheim Knights of the German ProA. He averaged 16.9 points, 3.0 rebounds, 3.3 assists and 27.8 minutes in 33 games played.

=== Ottawa BlackJacks (2023) ===
The Ottawa BlackJacks announced they had signed Flowers on May 2, 2023.

=== Return to VfL Kirchheim Knights (2023–2024) ===
On August 15, 2023, Flowers returned to VfL Kirchheim Knights.

=== Antwerp Giants (2024–2025) ===
On July 2, 2024, he signed with Antwerp Giants of the BNXT League.

=== USC Heidelberg (2025) ===
On August 1, 2025, he signed with MLP Academics Heidelberg of the Basketball Bundesliga (BBL).

=== Lietkabelis Panevėžys (2025–2026) ===
On October 23, 2025, Flowers signed a contract until the end of the 2025–26 season with Lietkabelis Panevėžys of the Lithuanian Basketball League (LKL) and the EuroCup. On February 16, 2026, Flowers left Lietkabelis by mutual agreement.

=== Petkim Spor (2026) ===
On February 17, 2026, Flowers signed with Petkim Spor of the Basketbol Süper Ligi (BSL).

=== Élan Béarnais (2026–present) ===
On July 23, 2026, he signed with Élan Béarnais of the LNB Élite.

== Career statistics ==
Legend
GP	Games played	GS	Games started	MPG	Minutes per game
FG%	Field-goal percentage	3P%	3-point field-goal percentage	FT%	Free-throw percentage
RPG	Rebounds per game	APG	Assists per game	SPG	Steals per game
BPG	Blocks per game	PPG	Points per game	PIR	Performance index rating
**Bold**	Career high

=== EuroCup ===
Year	Team	GP	GS	MPG	FG%	3P%	FT%	RPG	APG	SPG	BPG	PPG	PIR
2025–26	Lietkabelis Panevėžys	**14**	**7**	**26.3**	**.421**	**.328**	**.859**	**2.1**	**3.5**	**1.2**	**.2**	**13.1**	**13.9**
Career		14	7	26.3	.421	.328	.859	2.1	3.5	1.2	.2	13.1	13.9

=== College ===
Year	Team	GP	GS	MPG	FG%	3P%	FT%	RPG	APG	SPG	BPG	PPG
2017–18	Western Michigan	23	0	8.7	**.460**	**.480**	.700	1.0	.5	.2	.0	3.4
2018–19	Western Michigan	32	32	31.3	.387	.332	.784	3.9	3.3	.9	**.1**	15.7
2019–20	Western Michigan	32	32	32.2	.428	.368	**.844**	2.9	3.3	.8	.0	16.9
2020–21	South Alabama	28	28	**37.2**	.438	.388	.818	**4.6**	**3.6**	**1.6**	**.1**	**21.0**
2021–22	Washington State	**37**	**37**	32.5	.400	.369	.854	3.2	3.4	1.1	**.1**	14.2
Career		152	129	29.4	.415	.368	.815	3.2	2.9	.9	.1	14.7

=== Professional ===
Year	Team	GP	GS	MPG	FG%	3P%	FT%	RPG	APG	SPG	BPG	PPG
2022-2023	VfL Kirchheim Knights	33	27	27.8	.438	.373	.890	3.0	3.3	.8	.0	16.9
2023	Ottawa Blackjacks	18	11	23.1	.388	.323	.861	3.0	2.6	.6	.1	10.5
Career		51	38	26.1	.420	.355	.880	3.0	3.1	.7	.0	14.6

== Personal life ==
Flowers' mother, Joyce, died in 2018 after a three-year battle with pancreatic cancer. In November 2020, his father, Henry, died from cancer after a lengthy fight.
