= Rocky Trice =

American basketball player (born 1984)

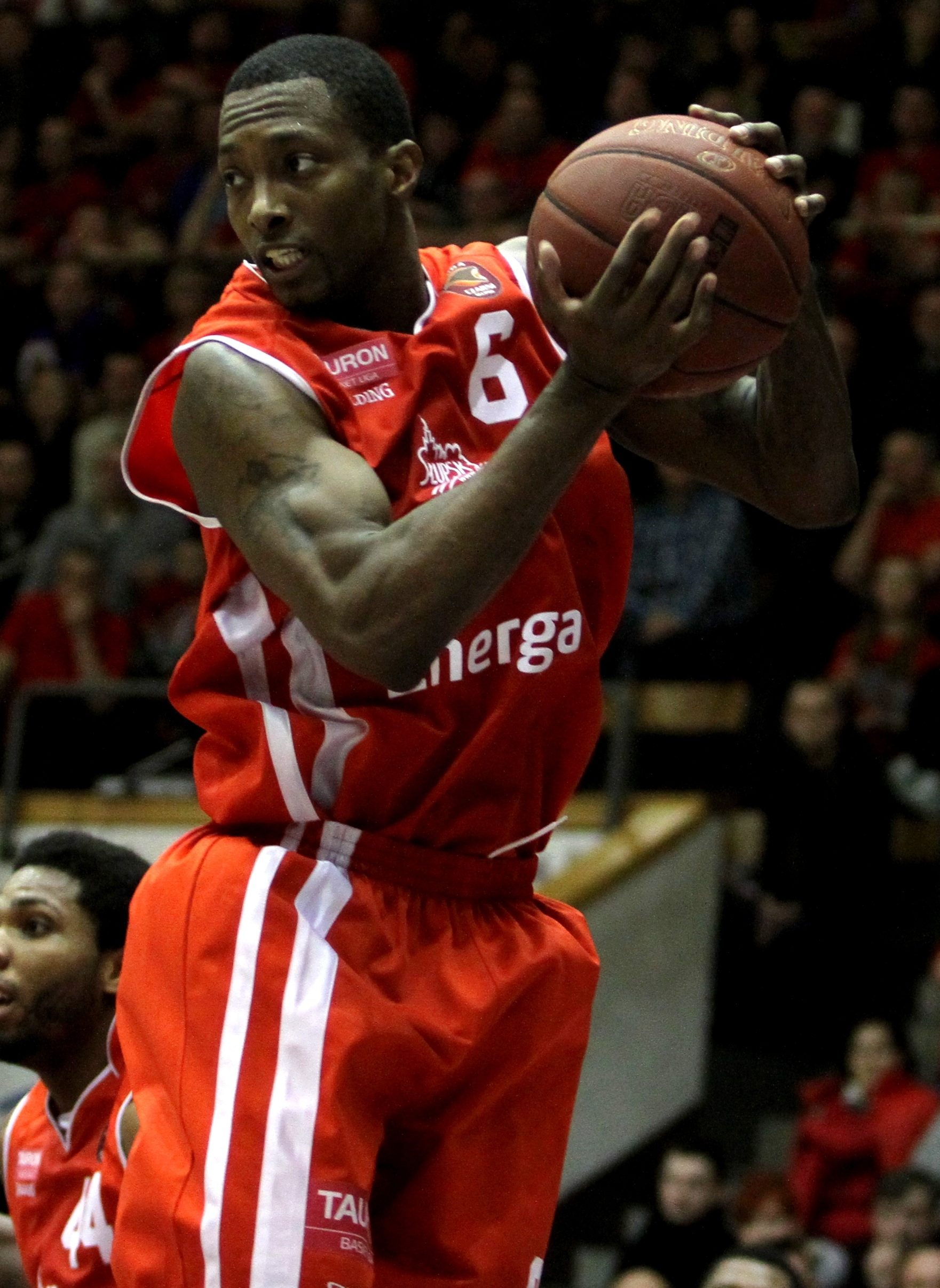
- Trice with Czarni Słupsk in December 2013

Personal information
- Born: June 14, 1984 (age 42) Atlanta, Georgia
- Listed height: 1.91 m (6 ft 3 in)
- Listed weight: 82 kg (181 lb)

Career information
- High school: Swainsboro (Swainsboro, Georgia)
- College: Georgia Perimeter (2002–2004); South Carolina (2004–2006)
- NBA draft: 2006: undrafted
- Playing career: 2006–2018
- Position: Shooting guard
- Number: 24

Career history
- 2006–2007: Rome Gladiators
- 2007–2008: Cuxhaven BasCats
- 2008–2009: Göttingen
- 2009–2012: ratiopharm Ulm
- 2013–2014: Czarni Słupsk
- 2014–2015: Śląsk Wrocław
- 2015–2016: Riesen Ludwigsburg
- 2016: MKS Dąbrowa Górnicza
- 2017–2018: Riesen Ludwigsburg

Career highlights
- German League Most Improved Player (2009); German 2nd Division Player of the Year (2008)

Roderick "Rocky" Trice (born June 14, 1984) is an American retired basketball player.

== Professional career ==
In June 2006, Trice signed with ratiopharm Ulm for the 2009–10 season. Trice spent the 2014-15 season with Śląsk Wrocław and averaged 13 points and 2.3 assists per game. He signed with Riesen Ludwigsburg on August 3, 2015.
