= Basketball Bundesliga Most Improved Player =

German basketball award

The Basketball Bundesliga Most Improved Player was an award that was handed out yearly to the player who made the most progress in the regular season of the Basketball Bundesliga. The first time the award was handed out was in 2003, the first winner was Philip Zwiener. Since the 2015–16 season, the award is not handed out any more.

== Winners ==
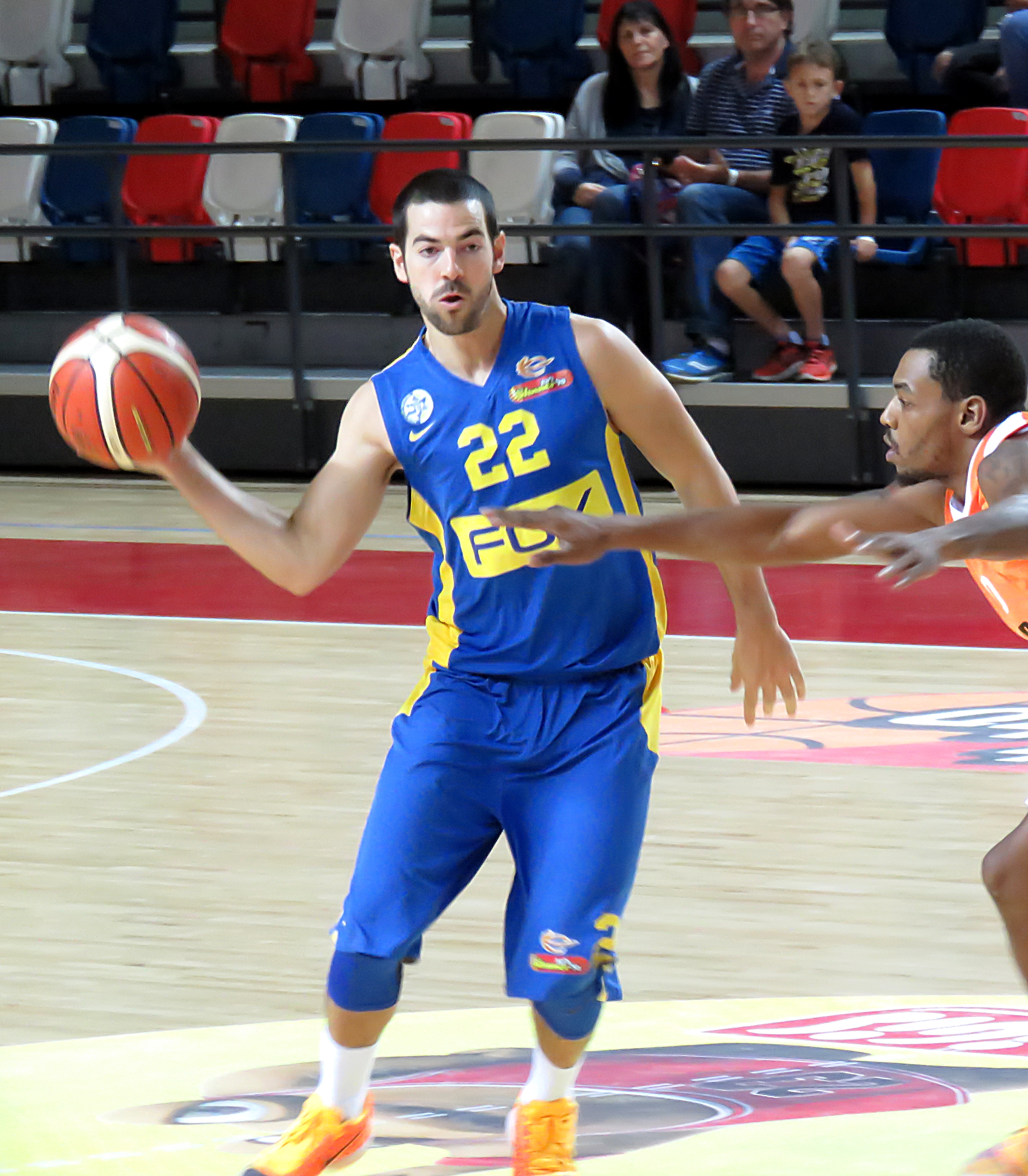
Taylor Rochestie was the German League's Most Improved Player, in 2010

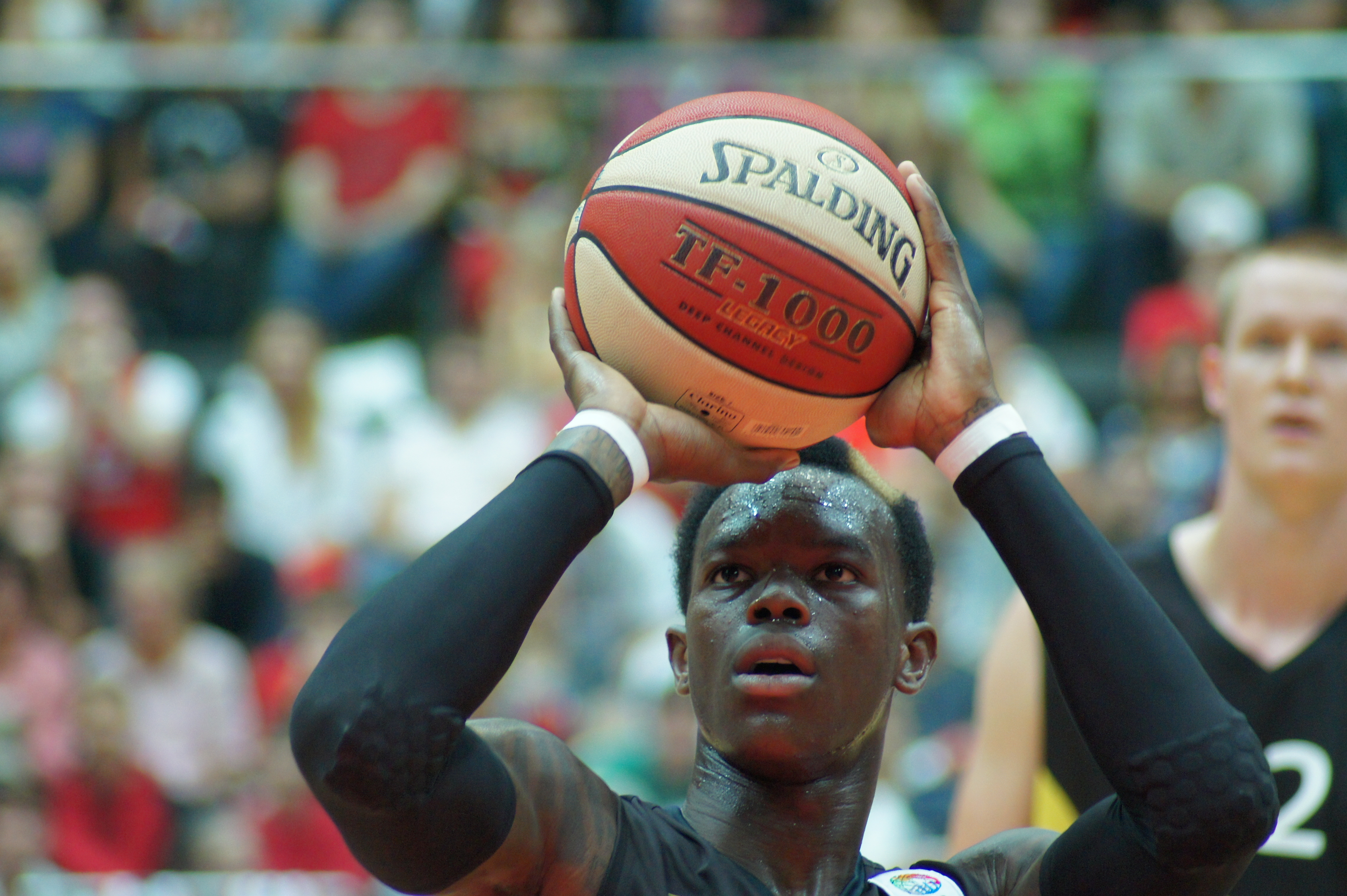
Dennis Schröder was the German League's Most Improved Player, in 2013

Key
Player (X)	Name of the player and number of times they had won the award at that point (if more than one)

Note: Flags indicate national team eligibility at FIBA-sanctioned events. Players may hold other non-FIBA nationalities not displayed.

Season	Player	Position	Nationality	Team	Ref(s)
Newcomer of the Year (2002–03 to 2009–10)
2002–03	Steffen Hamann	PG	Germany	Brose Baskets	
2003–04	Demond Greene	SG	Germany	Bayer Giants Leverkusen	
2004–05	Anton Gavel	SG	Germany	Gießen 46ers	
2005–06	Andrew Wisniewski	PG	United States	Telekom Baskets Bonn	
2006–07	Je'Kel Foster	SG	United States	EnBW Ludwigsburg	
2007–08	Bobby Brown	PG	United States	ALBA Berlin	
2008–09	Rocky Trice	SG	United States	BG Göttingen	
2009–10	Taylor Rochestie	SG	Montenegro	BG Göttingen	
Most Improved Player (2010–11 to 2014–15)
2010–11	Philip Zwiener	SF	Germany	TBB Trier	
2011–12	Maik Zirbes	C	Germany	TBB Trier	
2012–13	Dennis Schröder	PG	Germany	New Yorker Phantoms Braunschweig	
2013–14	Danilo Barthel	PF	Germany	Fraport Skyliners	
2014–15	Johannes Voigtmann	C	Germany	Fraport Skyliners	

== Awards won by nationality ==
Country	Total
Germany	8
United States	4
Montenegro	1

== Awards won by club ==
Country	Total
TBB Trier	2
Fraport Skyliners	2
BG Göttingen	2
New Yorker Phantoms Braunschweig	1
Telekom Baskets Bonn	1
ALBA Berlin	1
EnBW Ludwigsburg	1
Gießen 46ers	1
Brose Baskets	1
Bayer Giants Leverkusen	1
