= Will McDowell-White =

Australian basketball player

William McDowell-White
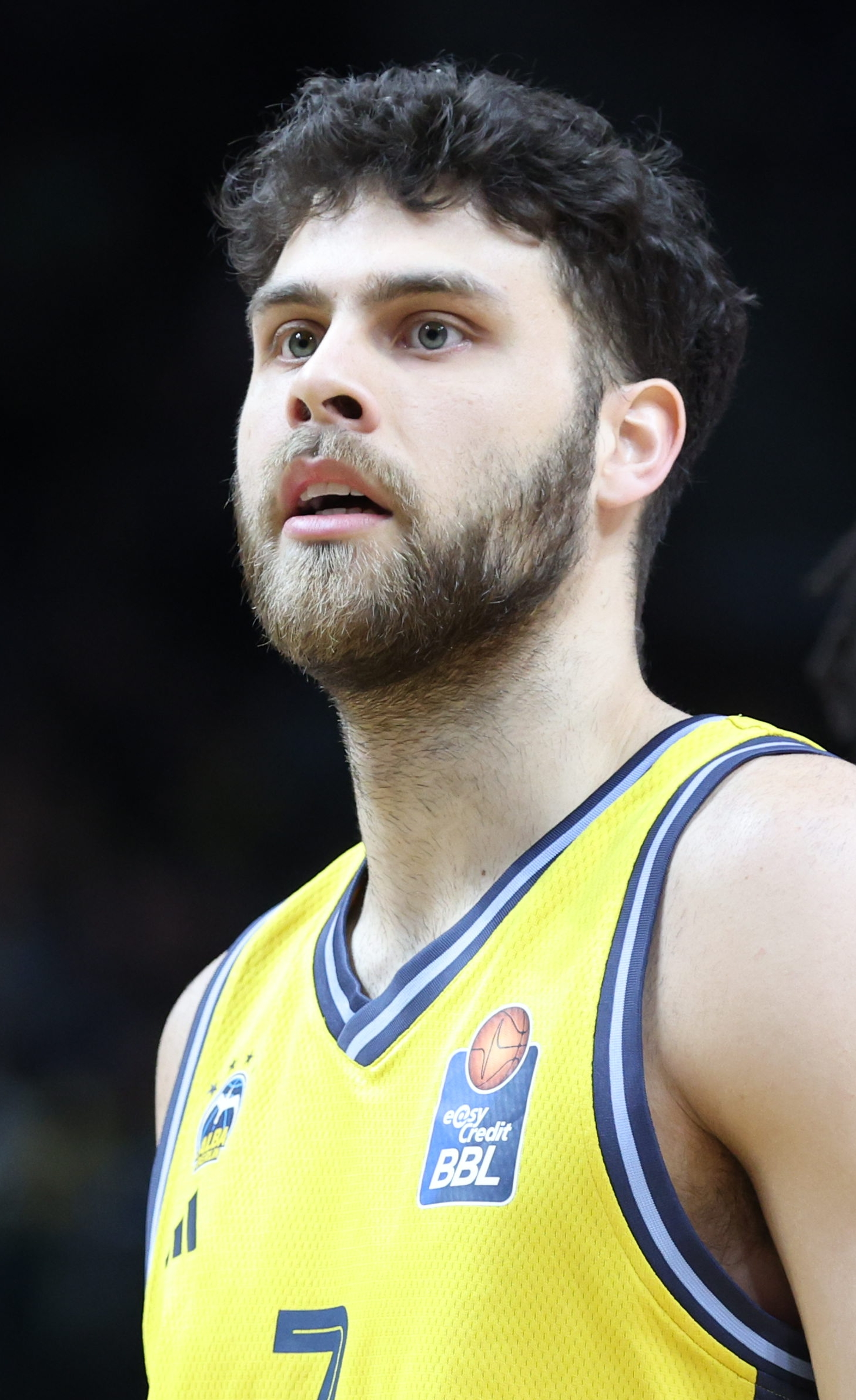
- McDowell-White with Alba Berlin in 2024

No. 7 – Openjobmetis Varese
- Position: Point guard / shooting guard
- League: LBA; Champions League

Personal information
- Born: 13 April 1998 (age 28) Brisbane, Queensland, Australia
- Listed height: 196 cm (6 ft 5 in)
- Listed weight: 89 kg (196 lb)

Career information
- High school: Anglican Church Grammar School (Brisbane, Queensland); Ignatius Park College (Townsville, Queensland)
- NBA draft: 2019: undrafted
- Playing career: 2014–present

Career history
- 2014, 2016–2017: Brisbane Spartans
- 2016–2017: Sydney Kings
- 2017–2019: Brose Bamberg
- 2017–2019: →Baunach Young Pikes
- 2019: Southern Districts Spartans
- 2019–2021: Rio Grande Valley Vipers
- 2020: RedCity Roar
- 2021–2024: New Zealand Breakers
- 2024–2025: Alba Berlin
- 2025–2026: JL Bourg
- 2026–present: Varese

Career highlights
- EuroCup champion (2026); ProA Young Player of the Year (2018)
- Stats at Basketball Reference
Medals
Men's basketball
Representing Australia
FIBA Asia Cup
Gold medal – first place	2022 Jakarta

William McDowell-White (born 13 April 1998) is an Australian professional basketball player for Pallacanestro Varese of the Lega Basket Serie A (LBA). He debuted in the NBL in 2016 with the Sydney Kings before playing two seasons in Germany and then two seasons in the NBA G League. He joined the Breakers in 2021.

== Early life and career ==
McDowell-White was born in Brisbane, into a family of Indigenous Australian (Torres Strait Islander, Warumungu and Arrernte) descent. His father, Darryl White, played Australian rules football for the Brisbane Bears/Lions, where he won three AFL premierships. McDowell-White grew up playing Australian rules football for Coorparoo and was placed in the Brisbane Lions talent academy at the age of 13. At age 15, he decided to focus on basketball.

In 2014 and 2016, McDowell-White played in the SEABL for the Brisbane Spartans. He re-joined the Spartans in 2017 with their move to the QBL.

== Professional career ==
=== Sydney Kings (2016–2017) ===
In December 2016, McDowell-White joined the Sydney Kings of Australia's NBL as a development player for the rest of the 2016–17 season.

=== Brose Bamberg / Baunach Young Pikes (2017–2019) ===
McDowell-White signed a four-year deal with Brose Bamberg, of the Basketball Bundesliga, which is Germany's top division, in July 2017. He was later assigned to Baunach Young Pikes, the farm team of Brose Bamberg, for the 2017–18 season's German 2nd Division season. He was recalled to Brose Bamberg, on 17 December. In the 2017–18 season, while playing for Baunach, he was named the ProA Young Player of the Year. After testing the waters for the 2018 NBA draft, McDowell-White returned to Brose Bamberg for the 2018–19 season. He spent most of the season with Baunach again.

In May 2019, McDowell-White had a one-game stint with the Southern Districts Spartans in the QBL.

=== Rio Grande Valley Vipers / RedCity Roar (2019–2021) ===
After failing to be drafted in the 2019 NBA draft, McDowell-White signed an Exhibit-10 contract with the Houston Rockets, and would go on to play for the Rockets in the 2019 NBA Summer League. He later had his contract converted to a two-way deal, a decision that was later reversed. On 27 September, McDowell-White was waived by the Rockets to make room on their training camp roster for Ryan Anderson. McDowell-White was then added to the roster of the Rockets' NBA G League affiliate, the Rio Grande Valley Vipers. He suffered an injury in November and was inactive for several weeks.

McDowell-White played for the RedCity Roar of the Queensland State League during the 2020 season.

McDowell-White turned down multiple offers from NBL teams to return to the NBA G League for the 2020–21 season. After another quick stint with the Rockets in December 2020, he played for the Vipers in the G League hub season between February and March 2021.

=== New Zealand Breakers (2021–2024) ===
On 13 March 2021, McDowell-White signed with the New Zealand Breakers. On 16 April 2021, he recorded 13 points, 14 assists and 10 rebounds in a 91–71 win over the Brisbane Bullets. He became just the second player in Breakers' history to record a triple-double, joining Cedric Jackson.

On 26 June 2021, McDowell-White re-signed with the Breakers for the 2021–22 NBL season.

On 25 May 2022, McDowell-White re-signed with the Breakers for the 2022–23 NBL season.

On 11 April 2023, McDowell-White re-signed with the Breakers on a two-year deal. He missed the start of the 2023–24 NBL season with a hand injury. On 17 November 2023, he was ruled out for six weeks with a fractured fibula. He parted ways with the Breakers following the 2023–24 season.

=== Alba Berlin (2024–present) ===
On May 15, 2024, McDowell-White signed a two-year deal with Alba Berlin of the German Basketball Bundesliga (BBL).

=== JL Bourg (2025–2026) ===
On July 7, 2025, he signed with JL Bourg of the LNB Pro A.

=== Pallacanestro Varese (2026–present) ===
On July 7, 2026, he signed with Pallacanestro Varese of the Lega Basket Serie A (LBA).

== National team career ==
In 2013, McDowell-White represented Australia at the FIBA Oceania Under-16 Championship. Two years later, he played for Australia at the 2015 FIBA Under-19 World Championship.

In June 2022, McDowell-White was named in the Boomers' World Cup Qualifiers team.

In July 2022, McDowell-White represented the Boomers at the Asia Cup, who won the gold medal. He averaged 8.2 points, 5.8 assists and 5.3 rebounds for the tournament.

== Career statistics ==
Legend
GP	Games played	GS	Games started	MPG	Minutes per game
FG%	Field-goal percentage	3P%	3-point field-goal percentage	FT%	Free-throw percentage
RPG	Rebounds per game	APG	Assists per game	SPG	Steals per game
BPG	Blocks per game	PPG	Points per game	PIR	Performance index rating
**Bold**	Career high

=== EuroLeague ===
Year	Team	GP	GS	MPG	FG%	3P%	FT%	RPG	APG	SPG	BPG	PPG	PIR
2017–18	Bamberg	2	0	1.0	—	1.000	—	—	—	—	—	1.5	1.5
Career		2	0	1.0	—	1.000	—	—	—	—	—	1.5	1.5
