= Ben Burnham =

American basketball player (born 2002)

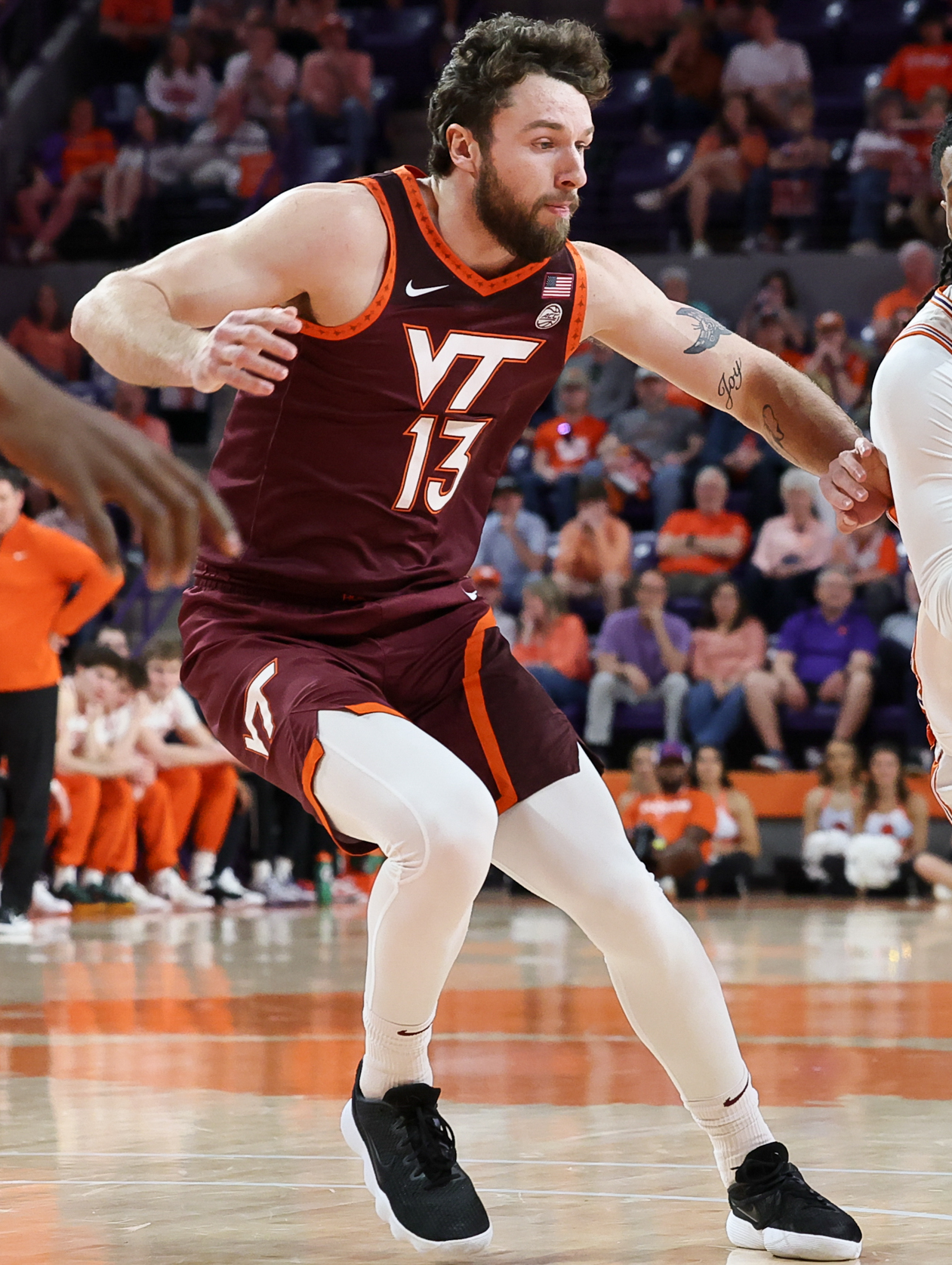
- Burnham in 2025

No. 25 – Niners Chemnitz
- Position: Forward
- League: Basketball Bundesliga; EuroCup

Personal information
- Born: April 3, 2002 (age 24) Nashville, Tennessee, U.S.
- Listed height: 6 ft 7 in (2.01 m)
- Listed weight: 220 lb (100 kg)

Career information
- High school: Carmel Christian School (Matthews, North Carolina)
- College: Charleston (2021–2024); Virginia Tech (2024–2025)
- NBA draft: 2025: undrafted
- Playing career: 2025–present

Career history
- 2025–2026: Artland Dragons
- 2026–present: Niners Chemnitz

Career highlights
- ProA Player of the Year (2026); Third-team All-CAA (2024); All-CAA Rookie Team (2022)

Benjamin "Ben" Forrest Burnham (born April 3, 2002) is an American professional basketball player for Niners Chemnitz of the Basketball Bundesliga (BBL) and the EuroCup. He played college basketball for the Charleston Cougars and the Virginia Tech Hokies. He also played one season for the Artland Dragons of the German ProA League.

== Early life and high school career ==
Burnham was born in Nashville, Tennessee and grew up in Fort Mill, South Carolina. His grandfather and uncle both played basketball for South Carolina and his father, Roger, holds the all-time points record for a freshman at Virginia Wesleyan. He played high school basketball for Carmel Christian Academy in Charlotte, North Carolina, and as a senior lead his team to second place in the state championship. He was selected for the NCISAA All-State Team in both his junior and senior seasons.

== College career ==
=== Charleston ===
In his freshman season for the Charleston Cougars, Burnham averaged 7.7 points per game on 47.3% shooting, earning him a spot on the Coastal Athletic Association (CAA) all-rookie team. In his sophomore year he averaged 8.8 points per game on 53 percent shooting, helping his team win the 2023 CAA tournament and qualify for the NCAA tournament. Burnham scored a career-high 25 points against Stony Brook on February 25, 2023, a win which helped the 2022–23 Cougars clinch the regular season championship. Burnham improved in his junior year, scoring 11.9 points per game and earning a spot on the All-CAA Third Team. The 2023–24 Cougars went back-to-back in winning the CAA tournament and qualifying for the NCAA tournament, where Burnham put up 19 points against Final Four Team Alabama.

=== Virginia Tech ===
On April 4, 2024, Burnham announced that he would be transferring to the Virginia Tech Hokies for his senior season. Across 32 games, Burnham averaged 7.5 points, 3.9 rebounds, and 0.9 assists per game.

== Professional career ==
After going undrafted in the 2025 NBA Draft, Burnham signed with the Artland Dragons of the German ProA League. Across 36 games, Burnham averaged 20.3 points (second-most in the league), 2.3 assists, 1.3 steals, and a league-leading 9.6 rebounds per game. After the conclusion of the season he was voted ProA Player of the Year, Forward of the Year, and selected to the All-Imports Team.

On June 15, 2026, he signed with Niners Chemnitz of the Basketball Bundesliga (BBL).

== Career statistics ==
Legend
GP	Games played	GS	Games started	MPG	Minutes per game
FG%	Field goal percentage	3P%	3-point field goal percentage	FT%	Free throw percentage
RPG	Rebounds per game	APG	Assists per game	SPG	Steals per game
BPG	Blocks per game	PPG	Points per game	**Bold**	Career high

=== College ===
Year	Team	GP	GS	MPG	FG%	3P%	FT%	RPG	APG	SPG	BPG	PPG
2021–22	Charleston	32	26	19.8	.473	.324	.651	4.3	0.8	0.7	**0.5**	7.7
2022–23	Charleston	**35**	0	16.8	**.530**	**.446**	**.720**	3.7	0.5	0.3	0.3	8.8
2023–24	Charleston	**35**	**35**	**22.0**	.464	.368	.695	**4.5**	**0.9**	**0.9**	**0.5**	**11.9**
2024–25	Virginia Tech	32	2	**22.0**	.450	.427	.704	3.9	**0.9**	0.5	0.4	7.5
Career		134	63	20.1	.478	.393	.693	4.1	0.8	0.6	0.4	9.0
