= Cuxhaven BasCats =

- Founded: 2004
- Dissolved: 2015
- Arena: Rundturnhalle Cuxhaven
- Capacity: 1,531
- Location: Cuxhaven, Germany
Home	Away

Cuxhaven BasCats was a professional basketball club based in Cuxhaven, Germany. The BasCats play in the ProA, the second tier professional league in Germany.

In 2015, the club was declared bankrupt and its license was handed over to Rot-Weiss, another team based in Cuxhaven.

== Season by season ==
Season	Tier	League	Pos.	Postseason
2007–08	2	ProA	2	–
2008–09	2	ProA	12	–
2009–10	2	ProA	2	–
2010–11	2	ProA	11	–
2011–12	2	ProA	13	–
2012–13	2	ProA	5	Quarterfinalist

== Players ==
=== Individual awards ===
ProA Player of the Year

- (United States) Roderick Trice – 2008

=== Notable players ===
Note: Flags indicate national team eligibility at FIBA-sanctioned events. Players may hold other non-FIBA nationalities not displayed.

Criteria

To appear in this section a player must have either:

- Set a club record or won an individual award while at the club
- Played at least one official international match for their national team at any time
- Played at least one official NBA match at any time.

- (United States) Danny Gibson
- (United States) Monta McGhee
- (United States) Quinnel Brown
- (United States) Roderick Trice
