= 2012–13 ProA =

ProA
- Teams: 16

Regular season
- Season MVP: (United States) Richie Williams
- Promoted: Rasta Vechta
- Relegated: ~~Kirchheim Knights~~; Uni-Riesen Leipzig

Finals
- Champions: Rasta Vechta; 1st title
- Runners-up: Gloria Giants Düsseldorf

Awards
- Youngster o/t Year: (Germany) Akeem Vargas
- Coach o/t Year: (United States) Patrick Elzie

Statistical leaders
Points	(United States) Logan Stutz	20.1
Rebounds	(United States) Donald Lawson	10.3
Assists	(United States) Richie Williams	6.7

The 2012–13 ProA was the 6th season of the ProA, the second level of basketball in Germany. SC Rasta Vechta won the league and promoted to the Basketball Bundesliga by winning 2–0 in the Finals over Gloria Giants Düsseldorf.

== Standings ==
Pos	Team	Pld	W	L	PF	PA	PD	Qualification or relegation
1	SC Rasta Vechta	30	23	7	2781	2488	+293	Playoffs
2	BG Göttingen	30	22	8	2411	2198	+213	Playoffs
3	Gloria Giants Düsseldorf	30	22	8	2306	2221	+85	Playoffs
4	BG Karlsruhe	30	18	12	2446	2346	+100	Playoffs
5	Cuxhaven BasCats	30	17	13	2554	2518	+36	Playoffs
6	Nürnberger BC	30	16	14	2472	2513	−41	Playoffs
7	Science City Jena	30	15	15	2597	2578	+19	Playoffs
8	Erdgas Ehingen/Urspringschule	30	15	15	2224	2217	+7	Playoffs
9	MLP Heidelberg	30	14	16	2509	2452	+57	–
10	BV Chemnitz 99	32	14	18	2204	2290	−86	–
11	Crailsheim Merlins	30	13	17	2414	2446	−32	–
12	ETB Wohnbau Baskets	30	12	18	2326	2452	−126	–
13	finke baskets Paderborn	30	12	18	2416	2515	−99	–
14	Oettinger Rockets Gotha	30	11	19	2380	2478	−98	–
15	Kirchheim Knights	30	10	20	2515	2655	−140	Relegation to 2013–14 Pro B
16	Uni-Riesen Leipzig	30	8	22	2449	2637	−188	Relegation to 2013–14 Pro B

== Playoffs ==
Quarterfinals
1	SC Rasta Vechta	3
8	Erdgas Ehingen/Urspringschule	0
4	BG Karlsruhe	3
5	Cuxhaven BasCats	1
2	BG Göttingen	1
7	Science City Jena	3
3	Gloria Giants Düsseldorf	3
6	Nürnberger BC	2

Semifinals
1	SC Rasta Vechta	3
4	BG Karlsruhe	2
7	Science City Jena	0
3	Gloria Giants Düsseldorf	3

Finals
1	SC Rasta Vechta	2
3	Gloria Giants Düsseldorf	0

== Awards ==
- Player of the Year: (United States) Richie Williams (SC Rasta Vechta)
- Young Player of the Year: (Germany) Akeem Vargas (BG Göttingen)
- Coach of the Year: (United States) Patrick Elzie (SC Rasta Vechta)

== Statistical leaders ==
=== Points ===
Rank	Name	Team	PPG
1	(United States) Logan Stutz	ETB Wohnbau	20.1
2	(United States) Scott Thomas	Cuxhaven	19.7
3	(United States) Chase Griffin	Gotha	18.2
4	(United States) Devin White	Heidelberg	16.8
5	(United States) Zamal Nixon	Nürnberger BC	16.8

=== Rebounds ===
Rank	Name	Team	RPG
1	(United States) Donald Lawson	Chemnitz	10.3
2	(United States) Jeremy Black	Karlsruhe	8.8
3	(United States) Chris Gadley	Düsseldorf	8.8
4	(United States) Logan Stutz	ETB Wohnbau	8.1
5	(United States) Stevie Johnson	Crailsheim	7.9

=== Assists ===
Rank	Name	Team	APG
1	(United States) Richie Williams	Rasta Vechta	6.7
2	(United States) Derek Coleman	Crailsheim	6.1
3	(United States) Ahmad Smith	Nürnberger	5.7
4	(Israel) Guy Aud	finke Paderborn	5.5
5	(United States) Aaron Cook	ETB Wohnbau	5.1
