= 2025–26 Campbell Fighting Camels men's basketball team =

American college basketball season

2025–26 Campbell Fighting Camels men's basketball
- Conference: Coastal Athletic Association
- Record: 16–18 (8–10 CAA)
- Head coach: John Andrzejek (1st season)
- Associate head coach: Landry Kosmalski; Eddie Hill
- Assistant coaches: Anthony Lorenzo; Austin Burnette; Joseph Yesufu
- Home arena: Gore Arena

2025–26 CAA men's basketball standings
	Conf.				Overall
Team	W		L	PCT	W		L	PCT
UNC Wilmington	15	–	3	.833	26	–	6	.813
Charleston	14	–	4	.778	21	–	11	.656
Hofstra	12	–	6	.667	23	–	10	.697
Monmouth	11	–	7	.611	19	–	14	.576
Drexel	10	–	8	.556	17	–	16	.515
William & Mary	10	–	8	.556	20	–	12	.625
Towson	9	–	9	.500	19	–	15	.559
Stony Brook	9	–	9	.500	17	–	15	.531
Campbell	8	–	10	.444	16	–	18	.471
Hampton	7	–	11	.389	13	–	19	.406
Elon	6	–	12	.333	14	–	18	.438
North Carolina A&T	4	–	14	.222	11	–	19	.367
Northeastern	2	–	16	.111	7	–	24	.226
† 2026 CAA tournament winner As of March 9, 2026

The 2025–26 Campbell Fighting Camels men's basketball team represented Campbell University during the 2025–26 NCAA Division I men's basketball season. The Fighting Camels, led by first-year head coach John Andrzejek, played their home games at Gore Arena in Buies Creek, North Carolina as third-year members of the Coastal Athletic Association.

== Previous season ==
The Fighting Camels finished the 2024–25 season 15–17, 10–8 in CAA play, to finish in a tie for fifth place. They were upset by #12 seed Delaware in the second round of the CAA tournament.

On March 9, the day after their upset loss to Delaware, the school announced that they would not be renewing the contract of head coach Kevin McGeehan, ending his 12-season tenure with the team. A month later, on April 9, the school announced that they would be hiring Florida assistant coach John Andrzejek as McGeehan's successor.

== Preseason ==
On October 2, 2025, the CAA released their preseason coaches poll. Campbell was picked to finish seventh in the conference.

=== Preseason rankings ===
CAA Preseason Poll
Place	Team	Points
1	Towson	136 (7)
2	UNC Wilmington	132 (5)
3	Charleston	130 (1)
4	William & Mary	93
5	Hampton	80
6	Monmouth	76
7	Campbell	75
T-8	Hofstra	66
T-8	Northeastern	66
10	Drexel	63
11	Stony Brook	41
12	Elon	35
13	North Carolina A&T	17
(#) first-place votes

=== Preseason All-CAA Teams ===
Preseason All-CAA Honorable Mention
Player	Year	Position
Dovydas Butka	Sophomore	Forward

== Roster ==
2025–26 Campbell Fighting Camels men's basketball team
Players
Coaches

Pos.	#	Name	Height	Weight	Year	Previous school	Hometown
F	0	Chris Fields Jr.	6 ft 7 in (2.01 m)	240 lb (109 kg)	Jr	Norfolk State	Petersburg, Virginia
G	1	Tasos Cook	6 ft 2 in (1.88 m)	200 lb (91 kg)	GS	Vincennes	Columbus, Ohio
G	2	Jeremiah Johnson	6 ft 4 in (1.93 m)	180 lb (82 kg)	So	Green Bay	Del City, Oklahoma
G	4	Broc Bidwell	6 ft 0 in (1.83 m)	170 lb (77 kg)	RS Sr	Milton High School	Cumming, Georgia
G	5	Enoch Kalambay	6 ft 6 in (1.98 m)	215 lb (98 kg)	GS	Western Kentucky	Gatineau, Quebec
G	7	Cam Gregory	6 ft 5 in (1.96 m)	170 lb (77 kg)	Sr	Saint Francis (PA)	Accokeek, Maryland
G	9	DJ Smith	6 ft 0 in (1.83 m)	160 lb (73 kg)	GS	Robert Morris	North Little Rock, Arkansas
G	10	Klairus Amir	6 ft 7 in (2.01 m)	180 lb (82 kg)	Fr	Dream City Christian School	Sydney, Australia
F	11	Muneer Newton	6 ft 5 in (1.96 m)	225 lb (102 kg)	GS	Delaware State	Philadelphia, Pennsylvania
F	12	Israel Yaw	6 ft 9 in (2.06 m)	205 lb (93 kg)	Sr	Maryland Eastern Shore	Georgetown, Guyana
F	13	Dovydas Butka	6 ft 9 in (2.06 m)	215 lb (98 kg)	So	Pepperdine	Panevėžys, Lithuania
G	22	Dominykas Butka	6 ft 6 in (1.98 m)	220 lb (100 kg)	Fr	BC Žalgiris-2	Panevėžys, Lithuania
F	32	Daniel Marcellinus	6 ft 11 in (2.11 m)	275 lb (125 kg)	Fr	Hoosac School	Abia State, Nigeria

Head coach

- John Andrzejek (Columbia)

Assistant coach(es)

- Landry Kosmalski (Davidson)
- Eddie Hill (Washington State)
- Anthony Lorenzo (Rutgers)
- Austin Burnette (Campbell)
- Joseph Yesufu (West Virginia)

Legend

- (C) Team captain
- (S) Suspended
- (I) Ineligible
- (W) Walk-on
- Injured
- Current redshirt

Roster
Last update: October 14, 2025

== Schedule and results ==
Date time, TV	Rank^{#}	Opponent^{#}	Result	Record	Site (attendance) city, state
Non-conference regular season
November 3, 2025*; 8:00 pm, B1G+		at No. 24 Wisconsin	L 64–96	0–1	Kohl Center (13,695); Madison, WI
November 6, 2025*; 7:00 pm, ESPN+		at West Virginia	L 65–73	0–2	Hope Coliseum (9,251); Morgantown, WV
November 9, 2025*; 12:30 pm, FloHoops		Western Michigan	W 91–82	1–2	Gore Arena (1,392); Buies Creek, NC
November 13, 2025*; 7:00 pm, FloHoops		Mid-Atlantic Christian	W 108–55	2–2	Gore Arena (1,193); Buies Creek, NC
November 19, 2025*; 10:00 pm, ESPN+		at Weber State; Weber State Tournament	L 85–91	2–3	Dee Events Center (2,224); Ogden, UT
November 21, 2025*; 3:00 pm, ESPN+		vs. UT Arlington; Weber State Tournament	W 71–67	3–3	Dee Events Center (307); Ogden, UT
November 25, 2025*; 7:00 pm, ACCNX		at Wake Forest	L 51–99	3–4	LJVM Coliseum (6,049); Winston-Salem, NC
December 2, 2025*; 6:00 pm, BTN		at Penn State	L 76–87	3–5	Bryce Jordan Center (6,139); University Park, PA
December 7, 2025*; 4:00 pm, FloHoops		Virginia Lynchburg	W 149–62	4–5	Gore Arena (1,077); Buies Creek, NC
December 14, 2025*; 2:00 pm, FloHoops		Ball State	W 69–64	5–5	Gore Arena (1,139); Buies Creek, NC
December 17, 2025*; 9:00 pm, ESPN+		at No. 7 Gonzaga	L 70–98	5–6	McCarthey Athletic Center (6,000); Spokane, WA
December 21, 2025*; 6:00 pm, BTN		at Minnesota	L 50–78	5–7	Williams Arena (7,988); Minneapolis, MN
December 23, 2025*; 12:00 pm, FloHoops		Green Bay	W 102–79	6–7	Gore Arena (1,411); Buies Creek, NC
CAA regular season
December 29, 2025; 7:00 pm, FloHoops		at Hofstra	L 72–86	6–8 (0–1)	Mack Sports Complex (1,935); Hempstead, NY
December 31, 2025; 2:00 pm, FloHoops		at Monmouth	W 68–65	7–8 (1–1)	OceanFirst Bank Center (2,015); West Long Branch, NJ
January 3, 2026; 6:00 pm, CBSSN		Northeastern	W 97–82	8–8 (2–1)	Gore Arena (2,206); Buies Creek, NC
January 8, 2026; 7:00 pm, FloHoops		Hampton	W 86–72	9–8 (3–1)	Gore Arena (1,298); Buies Creek, NC
January 10, 2026; 7:00 pm, FloHoops		at Elon	L 82–83	9–9 (3–2)	Schar Center (1,743); Elon, NC
January 17, 2026; 7:00 pm, FloHoops		at UNC Wilmington	L 75−78	9−10 (3−3)	Trask Coliseum (5,220); Wilmington, NC
January 22, 2026; 7:00 pm, FloHoops		at Charleston	L 83−87	9−11 (3−4)	TD Arena (5,079); Charleston, SC
January 24, 2026; 4:00 pm, FloHoops		Monmouth	L 73−88	9−12 (3−5)	Gore Arena (1,415); Buies Creek, NC
January 29, 2026; 7:00 pm, FloHoops		Stony Brook	L 69−81	9−13 (3−6)	Gore Arena (1,411); Buies Creek, NC
January 31, 2026; 12:00 pm, CBSSN		at William & Mary	W 104−96	10−13 (4−6)	Kaplan Arena (4,860); Williamsburg, VA
February 5, 2026; 7:00 pm, FloHoops		Drexel	W 81–60	11–13 (5–6)	Gore Arena (1,336); Buies Creek, NC
February 7, 2026; 2:00 pm, FloHoops		at North Carolina A&T	W 79–71	12–13 (6–6)	Corbett Sports Center (1,411); Greensboro, NC
February 15, 2026; 5:00 pm, CBSSN		Charleston	L 57–62	12–14 (6–7)	Gore Arena (2,087); Buies Creek, NC
February 19, 2026; 7:00 pm, FloHoops		William & Mary	W 84–83	13–14 (7–7)	Gore Arena (1,332); Buies Creek, NC
February 21, 2026; 4:00 pm, FloHoops		UNC Wilmington	L 68–73	13–15 (7–8)	Gore Arena (2,765); Buies Creek, NC
February 26, 2026; 7:00 pm, FloHoops		at Drexel	L 60–65	13–16 (7–9)	Daskalakis Athletic Center (1,044); Philadelphia, PA
February 28, 2026; 2:00 pm, FloHoops		at Towson	L 67–71	13–17 (7–10)	TU Arena (3,212); Towson, MD
March 3, 2026; 7:00 pm, FloHoops		North Carolina A&T	W 90–72	14–17 (8–10)	Gore Arena (1,327); Buies Creek, NC
CAA tournament
March 7, 2026; 12:00 pm, FloHoops	(9)	vs. (8) Stony Brook; Second round	W 96–89	15–17	CareFirst Arena; Washington, D.C.
March 8, 2026; 12:00 pm, FloHoops	(9)	vs. (1) UNC Wilmington; Quarterfinal	W 85–70	16–17	CareFirst Arena (1,652); Washington, D.C.
March 9, 2026; 6:00 pm, CBSSN	(9)	vs. (4) Monmouth; Semifinal	L 64–74	16–18	CareFirst Arena (1,567); Washington, D.C.
*Non-conference game. ^{#}Rankings from AP Poll. (#) Tournament seedings in parentheses. All times are in Eastern.
