= 2025–26 UNC Wilmington Seahawks men's basketball team =

American college basketball season

2025–26 UNC Wilmington Seahawks men's basketball

CAA regular season champions

NIT, Second Round
- Conference: Coastal Athletic Association
- Record: 27–7 (15–3 CAA)
- Head coach: Takayo Siddle (6th season)
- Associate head coach: Kurt Kanaskie
- Assistant coaches: Craig Ponder; Paul Hemrick; Hunter Henderson; Austin Parker
- Home arena: Trask Coliseum

2025–26 CAA men's basketball standings
| | Conf. | | | | Overall |
| Team | W | | L | PCT | W | | L | PCT |
|---|---|---|---|---|---|---|---|---|
| UNC Wilmington | 15 | – | 3 | .833 | 27 | – | 7 | .794 |
| Charleston | 14 | – | 4 | .778 | 21 | – | 11 | .656 |
| Hofstra † | 12 | – | 6 | .667 | 24 | – | 11 | .686 |
| Monmouth | 11 | – | 7 | .611 | 19 | – | 15 | .559 |
| Drexel | 10 | – | 8 | .556 | 17 | – | 16 | .515 |
| William & Mary | 10 | – | 8 | .556 | 20 | – | 12 | .625 |
| Towson | 9 | – | 9 | .500 | 19 | – | 15 | .559 |
| Stony Brook | 9 | – | 9 | .500 | 17 | – | 15 | .531 |
| Campbell | 8 | – | 10 | .444 | 16 | – | 18 | .471 |
| Hampton | 7 | – | 11 | .389 | 13 | – | 19 | .406 |
| Elon | 6 | – | 12 | .333 | 14 | – | 18 | .438 |
| North Carolina A&T | 4 | – | 14 | .222 | 11 | – | 19 | .367 |
| Northeastern | 2 | – | 16 | .111 | 7 | – | 24 | .226 |
† 2026 CAA tournament winner

The 2025–26 UNC Wilmington Seahawks men's basketball team represented the University of North Carolina Wilmington during the 2025–26 NCAA Division I men's basketball season. The Seahawks, led by sixth-year head coach Takayo Siddle, played their home games at Trask Coliseum in Wilmington, North Carolina as members of the Coastal Athletic Association.

== Previous season ==
The Seahawks finished the 2024–25 season 27–8, 14–4 in CAA play, to finish in second place. They defeated Hampton, Charleston, and Delaware to win the CAA tournament championship, earning their first trip to the NCAA tournament since 2017. In the NCAA tournament, the Seahawks would receive the #14 seed in the West Region, where they would lose in the First Round to #3 region seed Texas Tech.

== Preseason ==
On October 2, 2025, the CAA released their preseason coaches poll. UNC Wilmington was picked to finish second in the conference, while receiving five first-place votes.

=== Preseason rankings ===
CAA Preseason Poll
| Place | Team | Points |
|---|---|---|
| 1 | Towson | 136 (7) |
| 2 | UNC Wilmington | 132 (5) |
| 3 | Charleston | 130 (1) |
| 4 | William & Mary | 93 |
| 5 | Hampton | 80 |
| 6 | Monmouth | 76 |
| 7 | Campbell | 75 |
| T-8 | Hofstra | 66 |
| T-8 | Northeastern | 66 |
| 10 | Drexel | 63 |
| 11 | Stony Brook | 41 |
| 12 | Elon | 35 |
| 13 | North Carolina A&T | 17 |
(#) first-place votes

=== Preseason All-CAA Teams ===
Preseason All-CAA First Team
| Player | Year | Position |
|---|---|---|
| CJ Luster II | Senior | Guard |

Preseason All-CAA Honorable Mention
| Player | Year | Position |
|---|---|---|
| Nolan Hodge | Senior | Guard |
| Noah Ross | Senior | Guard |

== Roster ==
2025–26 UNC Wilmington Seahawks men's basketball team
Players
Coaches

| Pos. | # | Name | Height | Weight | Year | Previous school | Hometown |
|---|---|---|---|---|---|---|---|
| G | 0 | Jahnathan Lamothe | 6 ft 4 in (1.93 m) | 192 lb (87 kg) | Jr | North Carolina A&T | Baltimore, Maryland |
| G | 1 | Madison Durr | 6 ft 5 in (1.96 m) | 195 lb (88 kg) | Sr | Monmouth | Atlanta, Georgia |
| F | 2 | Patrick Wessler | 7 ft 0 in (2.13 m) | 250 lb (113 kg) | RS Jr | Virginia Tech | Matthews, North Carolina |
| G | 3 | CJ Luster II | 6 ft 3 in (1.91 m) | 165 lb (75 kg) | Sr | Stony Brook | Denton, Texas |
| G | 4 | Nolan Hodge | 6 ft 7 in (2.01 m) | 190 lb (86 kg) | Sr | Northern Guilford High School | Greensboro, North Carolina |
| G | 5 | Noah Ross | 6 ft 7 in (2.01 m) | 210 lb (95 kg) | Sr | Trinity Academy | Apex, North Carolina |
| G | 7 | Greedy Williams | 6 ft 5 in (1.96 m) | 190 lb (86 kg) | Sr | Chipola College | Montgomery, Alabama |
| G/F | 8 | Christian May | 6 ft 5 in (1.96 m) | 210 lb (95 kg) | Sr | Towson | Edinburg, Virginia |
| G | 10 | Grady Whitt | 6 ft 3 in (1.91 m) | 170 lb (77 kg) | RS So | Colorado | Raleigh, North Carolina |
| G | 12 | Makel Smith | 6 ft 0 in (1.83 m) | 175 lb (79 kg) | So | Morehead High School | Eden, North Carolina |
| F | 13 | Makoi Mabor Makoi | 6 ft 11 in (2.11 m) | 240 lb (109 kg) | So | Gaston Christian School | Rumbek, South Sudan |
| G | 14 | JoJo Fullwood | 6 ft 2 in (1.88 m) | 195 lb (88 kg) | Sr | Brunswick Community College | Currie, North Carolina |
| F | 22 | Gavin Walsh | 6 ft 8 in (2.03 m) | 225 lb (102 kg) | Jr | Binghamton | Baltimore, Maryland |
| F/C | 24 | Matija Prodanovic | 6 ft 11 in (2.11 m) | 230 lb (104 kg) | Fr | KK Mladost VEBA | Užice, Serbia |
| F/C | 35 | Adam Tokpah | 6 ft 11 in (2.11 m) | 230 lb (104 kg) | Fr | The Sheffield College | Sheffield, England |

Head coach

- Takayo Siddle (Gardner–Webb)

Assistant coach(es)

- Kurt Kanaskie (La Salle)
- Craig Ponder (UNC Wilmington)
- Paul Hemrick (Georgia)
- Hunter Henderson (NC State)
- Austin Parker (NC State)

Legend

- (C) Team captain
- (S) Suspended
- (I) Ineligible
- (W) Walk-on
- Injured
- Current redshirt

Roster
Last update: October 18, 2025

== Schedule and results ==
| Date time, TV | Rank^{#} | Opponent^{#} | Result | Record | Site (attendance) city, state |
Exhibition
| October 18, 2025*; 2:00 pm | | High Point | L 98–99 ^{OT} | | Trask Coliseum; Wilmington, NC |
| October 26, 2025*; 2:00 pm | | Francis Marion | W 84–68 | | Trask Coliseum; Wilmington, NC |
Non-conference regular season
| November 3, 2025*; 7:00 pm, FloCollege | | Mount Olive | W 106–77 | 1–0 | Trask Coliseum (5,220); Wilmington, NC |
| November 10, 2025*; 7:00 pm, ESPN+ | | at Kent State | L 77–86 | 1–1 | MAC Center (2,435); Kent, OH |
| November 15, 2025*; 7:00 pm, FloCollege | | USC Upstate | W 73–60 | 2–1 | Trask Coliseum (5,220); Wilmington, NC |
| November 18, 2025*; 7:00 pm, FloCollege | | East Carolina | W 85–60 | 3–1 | Trask Coliseum (5,220); Wilmington, NC |
| November 21, 2025*; 7:00 pm, ESPN+ | | at Radford | W 81–73 | 4–1 | Dedmon Center (1,584); Radford, VA |
| November 26, 2025*; 7:00 pm, FloCollege | | Southeastern Louisiana; Live Oak Bank Holiday Classic | W 70–57 | 5–1 | Trask Coliseum (4,246); Wilmington, NC |
| November 28, 2025*; 3:00 pm, FloCollege | | Navy; Live Oak Bank Holiday Classic | W 87–57 | 6–1 | Trask Coliseum (5,220); Wilmington, NC |
| November 29, 2025*; 3:00 pm, FloCollege | | Gardner–Webb; Live Oak Bank Holiday Classic | W 88–62 | 7–1 | Trask Coliseum (4,119); Wilmington, NC |
| December 3, 2025*; 7:00 pm, FloCollege | | Marshall | W 70–69 | 8–1 | Trask Coliseum (5,220); Wilmington, NC |
| December 6, 2025*; 4:00 pm, ESPN+ | | at Louisiana | W 70–63 | 9–1 | Cajundome (2,382); Lafayette, LA |
| December 13, 2025*; 3:00 pm, ESPN+ | | at Valparaiso | W 73–70 | 10–1 | Athletics–Recreation Center (1,603); Valparaiso, IN |
| December 20, 2025*; 2:00 pm, FloCollege | | Howard | L 66–67 | 10–2 | Trask Coliseum (5,220); Wilmington, NC |
| December 27, 2025*; 12:00 pm, FloCollege | | Columbia (SC) | W 100–56 | 11–2 | Trask Coliseum (4,945); Wilmington, NC |
CAA regular season
| December 29, 2025; 7:00 pm, CBSSN | | at North Carolina A&T | W 87–78 | 12–2 (1–0) | Corbett Sports Center (1,429); Greensboro, NC |
| December 31, 2025; 7:00 pm, FloCollege | | Drexel | W 65–53 | 13–2 (2–0) | Trask Coliseum (5,038); Wilmington, NC |
| January 3, 2026; 7:00 pm, FloCollege | | Hampton | W 49–45 | 14–2 (3–0) | Trask Coliseum (5,220); Wilmington, NC |
| January 8, 2026; 7:00 pm, FloCollege | | at Northeastern | W 87–78 | 15–2 (4–0) | Cabot Center (653); Boston, MA |
| January 10, 2026; 6:00 pm, FloCollege | | at Stony Brook | W 75–71 | 16–2 (5–0) | Stony Brook Arena (1,845); Stony Brook, NY |
| January 17, 2026; 7:00 pm, FloCollege | | Campbell | W 78–75 | 17–2 (6–0) | Trask Coliseum (5,220); Wilmington, NC |
| January 22, 2026; 7:00 pm, FloCollege | | at William & Mary | L 70–77 | 17–3 (6–1) | Kaplan Arena (4,205); Williamsburg, VA |
| January 24, 2026; 12:00 pm, FloCollege | | at Hampton | W 75–67 | 18–3 (7–1) | Hampton Convocation Center (852); Hampton, VA |
| January 29, 2026; 9:00 pm, CBSSN | | at Towson | W 82–73 | 19–3 (8–1) | TU Arena (2,801); Towson, MD |
| February 5, 2026; 7:00 pm, CBSSN | | William & Mary | L 78–85 | 19–4 (8–2) | Trask Coliseum (5,220); Wilmington, NC |
| February 9, 2026; 8:00 pm, CBSSN | | at Charleston | W 76–64 | 20–4 (9–2) | TD Arena (5,176); Charleston, SC |
| February 12, 2026; 7:00 pm, FloCollege | | Elon | W 65–54 | 21–4 (10–2) | Trask Coliseum (5,220); Wilmington, NC |
| February 14, 2026; 4:00 pm, CBSSN | | Hofstra | W 70–66 | 22–4 (11–2) | Trask Coliseum (5,220); Wilmington, NC |
| February 19, 2026; 7:00 pm, FloCollege | | Monmouth | W 79–69 | 23–4 (12–2) | Trask Coliseum (5,220); Wilmington, NC |
| February 21, 2026; 4:00 pm, FloCollege | | at Campbell | W 73–68 | 24–4 (13–2) | Gore Arena (2,765); Buies Creek, NC |
| February 26, 2026; 7:00 pm, FloCollege | | North Carolina A&T | W 88–65 | 25–4 (14–2) | Trask Coliseum (5,220); Wilmington, NC |
| March 1, 2026; 7:00 pm, CBSSN | | Charleston | L 76–79 | 25–5 (14–3) | Trask Coliseum (5,220); Wilmington, NC |
| March 3, 2026; 7:00 pm, FloCollege | | at Elon | W 76–57 | 26–5 (15–3) | Schar Center (2,419); Elon, NC |
CAA tournament
| March 8, 2026; 12:00 pm, FloHoops | (1) | vs. (9) Campbell; Quarterfinals | L 70–85 | 26–6 | CareFirst Arena (1,652); Washington, D.C. |
NIT
| March 17, 2026; 7:00 p.m., ESPN+ | | at (3 WS) Yale; First round | W 68–67 | 27–6 | Payne Whitney Gymnasium (542); New Haven, CT |
| March 21, 2026; 7:00 p.m., ESPN+ | | (2 WS) Dayton; Second round | L 61–80 | 27–7 | Trask Coliseum (5,038); Wilmington, NC |
*Non-conference game. ^{#}Rankings from AP Poll. (#) Tournament seedings in parentheses. WS=Winston-Salem. All times are in Eastern.
