= 2026 CAA men's basketball tournament =

American college basketball postseason tournament

- Classification: Division I
- Season: 2025–26
- Teams: 13
- Site: CareFirst Arena; Washington, D.C.
- Champions: Hofstra (2nd title)
- Winning coach: Speedy Claxton (1st title)
- MVP: Preston Edmead (Hofstra)
- Television: FloHoops, CBSSN

2025–26 CAA men's basketball standings
	Conf.				Overall
Team	W		L	PCT	W		L	PCT
UNC Wilmington	15	–	3	.833	27	–	7	.794
Charleston	14	–	4	.778	21	–	11	.656
Hofstra †	12	–	6	.667	24	–	11	.686
Monmouth	11	–	7	.611	19	–	15	.559
Drexel	10	–	8	.556	17	–	16	.515
William & Mary	10	–	8	.556	20	–	12	.625
Towson	9	–	9	.500	19	–	15	.559
Stony Brook	9	–	9	.500	17	–	15	.531
Campbell	8	–	10	.444	16	–	18	.471
Hampton	7	–	11	.389	13	–	19	.406
Elon	6	–	12	.333	14	–	18	.438
North Carolina A&T	4	–	14	.222	11	–	19	.367
Northeastern	2	–	16	.111	7	–	24	.226
† 2026 CAA tournament winner

The 2026 Coastal Athletic Association men's basketball tournament was the postseason men's college basketball tournament for the Coastal Athletic Association for the 2025–26 NCAA Division I men's basketball season. The tournament was held March 6–10, 2026, at CareFirst Arena in Washington, D.C. The winner, Hofstra, received the conference's automatic bid to the 2026 NCAA tournament.

== Seeds ==
All 13 CAA teams participated in the tournament. Teams were seeded by record within the conference, with a tiebreaker system to seed teams with identical conference records. The top 11 teams received a first round bye, and the top four teams received a double bye, automatically advancing them into the quarterfinals.

Seed	School	Conf.	Tiebreaker
1	UNC Wilmington	15–3	
2	Charleston	14–4	
3	Hofstra	12–6	
4	Monmouth	11–7	
5	Drexel	10–8	1–0 vs. William & Mary
6	William & Mary	10–8	0–1 vs. Drexel
7	Towson	9–9	2–0 vs. Stony Brook
8	Stony Brook	9–9	0–2 vs. Towson
9	Campbell	8–10	
10	Hampton	7–11	
11	Elon	6–12	
12	North Carolina A&T	4–14	
13	Northeastern	2–16	

== Schedule ==
Session	Game	Time*	Matchup	Score	Television
First Round – Friday, March 6
1	1	2:00 p.m.	No. 12 North Carolina A&T vs. No. 13 Northeastern	72–88	FloHoops
Second Round – Saturday, March 7
2	2	12:00 p.m.	No. 8 Stony Brook vs. No. 9 Campbell	89–96	FloHoops
2	3	2:30 p.m.	No. 5 Drexel vs. No. 13 Northeastern	84–77	FloHoops
3	4	6:00 p.m.	No. 7 Towson vs. No. 10 Hampton	74–68	FloHoops
3	5	8:30 p.m.	No. 6 William & Mary vs. No. 11 Elon	72–62	FloHoops
Quarterfinals – Sunday, March 8
4	6	12:00 p.m.	No. 1 UNC Wilmington vs. No. 9 Campbell	70–85	FloHoops
4	7	2:30 p.m.	No. 4 Monmouth vs. No. 5 Drexel	65–57	FloHoops
5	8	6:00 p.m.	No. 2 Charleston vs. No. 7 Towson	56–81	FloHoops
5	9	8:30 p.m.	No. 3 Hofstra vs. No. 6 William & Mary	92–61	FloHoops
Semifinals – Monday, March 9
6	10	6:00 p.m.	No. 4 Monmouth vs. No. 9 Campbell	74–64	CBSSN
6	11	8:30 p.m.	No. 3 Hofstra vs. No. 7 Towson	68–65^{OT}	CBSSN
Championship – Tuesday, March 10
7	12	7:00 p.m.	No. 3 Hofstra vs. No. 4 Monmouth	75–69	CBSSN
*Game times in ET. Rankings denote tournament seed

== Bracket ==
First round Friday, March 6
12	North Carolina A&T	72
13	Northeastern	88

Second round Saturday, March 7
8	Stony Brook	89
9	Campbell	96
5	Drexel	84
13	Northeastern	77
7	Towson	74
10	Hampton	68
6	William & Mary	72
11	Elon	62

Quarterfinals; Sunday, March 8
1	UNC Wilmington	70
9	Campbell	85
4	Monmouth	65
5	Drexel	57
2	Charleston	56
7	Towson	81
3	Hofstra	92
6	William & Mary	61

Semifinals; Monday, March 9
9	Campbell	64
4	Monmouth	74
7	Towson	65
3	Hofstra	68*

Championship; Tuesday, March 10
4	Monmouth	69
3	Hofstra	75

* denotes overtime period

== Awards and Honors ==
=== All-Tournament Team ===
Player	Team
**Preston Edmead**	Hofstra
Cruz Davis	Hofstra
Kavion McClain	Monmouth
Jason Rivera-Torres	Monmouth
Jeremiah Johnson	Campbell
Tyler Tejada	Towson

MVP in bold

== See also ==
- 2026 CAA women's basketball tournament
