= 2025–26 Northeastern Huskies men's basketball team =

American college basketball season

2025–26 Northeastern Huskies men's basketball
- Conference: Coastal Athletic Association
- Record: 7–24 (2–16 CAA)
- Head coach: Bill Coen (20th season)
- Assistant coaches: Matt Janning; Brian McDonald; Joel Smith
- Home arena: Matthews Arena (first two games); Cabot Center

2025–26 CAA men's basketball standings
	Conf.				Overall
Team	W		L	PCT	W		L	PCT
UNC Wilmington	15	–	3	.833	26	–	6	.813
Charleston	14	–	4	.778	21	–	11	.656
Hofstra †	12	–	6	.667	24	–	10	.706
Monmouth	11	–	7	.611	19	–	15	.559
Drexel	10	–	8	.556	17	–	16	.515
William & Mary	10	–	8	.556	20	–	12	.625
Towson	9	–	9	.500	19	–	15	.559
Stony Brook	9	–	9	.500	17	–	15	.531
Campbell	8	–	10	.444	16	–	18	.471
Hampton	7	–	11	.389	13	–	19	.406
Elon	6	–	12	.333	14	–	18	.438
North Carolina A&T	4	–	14	.222	11	–	19	.367
Northeastern	2	–	16	.111	7	–	24	.226
† 2026 CAA tournament winner As of March 10, 2026

The 2025–26 Northeastern Huskies men's basketball team represented Northeastern University during the 2025–26 NCAA Division I men's basketball season. The Huskies, led by 20th-year head coach Bill Coen, played their first two home games at the Matthews Arena, before moving to the Cabot Center for the remainder of the season, due to the planned demolition of the Matthews Arena. They competed as members of the Coastal Athletic Association.

== Previous season ==
The Huskies finished the 2024–25 season 17–15, 9–9 in CAA play, to finish in a tie for seventh place. They were defeated by Hampton in the second round of the CAA tournament.

== Preseason ==
On October 2, 2025, the CAA released their preseason coaches poll. Northeastern was picked to finish tied for eighth in the conference.

=== Preseason rankings ===
CAA Preseason Poll
Place	Team	Points
1	Towson	136 (7)
2	UNC Wilmington	132 (5)
3	Charleston	130 (1)
4	William & Mary	93
5	Hampton	80
6	Monmouth	76
7	Campbell	75
T-8	Hofstra	66
T-8	Northeastern	66
10	Drexel	63
11	Stony Brook	41
12	Elon	35
13	North Carolina A&T	17
(#) first-place votes

=== Preseason All-CAA Teams ===
Preseason All-CAA Second Team
Player	Year	Position
LA Pratt	Senior	Guard

== Roster ==
2025–26 Northeastern Huskies men's basketball team
Players
Coaches

Pos.	#	Name	Height	Weight	Year	Previous school	Hometown
F	0	Xander Alarie	6 ft 8 in (2.03 m)	233 lb (106 kg)	RS Fr	Miami (FL)	Bethesda, Maryland
G	1	Xavier Abreu	6 ft 3 in (1.91 m)	184 lb (83 kg)	Fr	Phillips Academy	Lynn, Massachusetts
G	2	Ryan Williams	6 ft 4 in (1.93 m)	180 lb (82 kg)	So	Malvern Prep	Phoenixville, Pennsylvania
G	3	LA Pratt	6 ft 5 in (1.96 m)	192 lb (87 kg)	Sr	Elon	Columbus, Ohio
G	4	Mike Loughnane	6 ft 4 in (1.93 m)	182 lb (83 kg)	Jr	Davidson	Quincy, Massachusetts
F	7	Youri Fritz	6 ft 9 in (2.06 m)	220 lb (100 kg)	Sr	Canisius	Tiel, Netherlands
G	8	William Kermoury	6 ft 5 in (1.96 m)	194 lb (88 kg)	Jr	Södertälje BBK	Stockholm, Sweden
F	9	Ty Francis	6 ft 7 in (2.01 m)	198 lb (90 kg)	Fr	Hotchkiss School	Brooklyn, New York
G	10	Miles Newton	6 ft 3 in (1.91 m)	204 lb (93 kg)	Fr	Breck School	Eden Prairie, Minnesota
G	11	JB Frankel	6 ft 3 in (1.91 m)	194 lb (88 kg)	Jr	Brewster Academy	New York, New York
C	12	Liam Koelsch	6 ft 9 in (2.06 m)	224 lb (102 kg)	Fr	Bishop O'Connell High School	Alexandria, Virginia
G	13	Luca Soroa Schaller	6 ft 7 in (2.01 m)	215 lb (98 kg)	So	212 Sports Academy	Valencia, Spain
C	21	Petar Pinter	6 ft 11 in (2.11 m)	202 lb (92 kg)	Fr	Gimnazija Stojan Cerovic	Nikšić, Montenegro
F	22	Haris Elezovic	6 ft 8 in (2.03 m)	230 lb (104 kg)	GS	West Virginia	Sherbrooke, Quebec

Head coach

- Bill Coen (Hamilton)

Assistant coach(es)

- Matt Janning (Northeastern)
- Brian McDonald (Northeastern)
- Joel Smith (Northeastern)

Legend

- (C) Team captain
- (S) Suspended
- (I) Ineligible
- (W) Walk-on
- Injured
- Current redshirt

Roster
Last update: October 17, 2025

== Schedule and results ==
Date time, TV	Rank^{#}	Opponent^{#}	Result	Record	High points	High rebounds	High assists	Site (attendance) city, state
Non-conference regular season
November 3, 2025*; 7:30 pm, NESN/FloCollege		Boston University	L 75–76 ^{OT}	0–1	26 – Pratt	6 – Alarie	4 – Pratt	Matthews Arena (2,189); Boston, MA
November 7, 2025*; 5:00 pm, ESPN+		at Colgate	W 68–65	1–1	21 – Fritz	13 – Alarie	5 – Pratt	Cotterell Court (766); Hamilton, NY
November 11, 2025*; 7:00 pm, ESPN+		at Harvard	W 77–60	2–1	23 – Alarie	13 – Fritz	6 – Schaller	Lavietes Pavilion (901); Allston, MA
November 15, 2025*; 1:00 pm, NESN+/FloCollege		Vermont	L 74–85	2–2	16 – Fritz	7 – Fritz	6 – Schaller	Matthews Arena (3,335); Boston, MA
November 20, 2025*; 7:00 pm, ESPN+		at Princeton	L 57–70	2−3	17 – Abreu	8 – Alarie	4 – Schaller	Jadwin Gymnasium; Princeton, NJ
November 22, 2025*; 4:00 pm		vs. Duquesne; Morgan & Morgan Classic	W 93–86	3–3	32 – Abreu	10 – Elezovic	3 – Alarie	LeBron James Arena (1,118); Akron, OH
November 28, 2025*; 12:00 pm, ACCNX		at Wake Forest	L 73–86	3–4	22 – Newton	6 – Alarie	6 – Alarie	LJVM Coliseum (6,853); Winston-Salem, NC
December 3, 2025*; 6:00 pm, ESPN+		at Holy Cross	L 59–76	3–5	15 – Loughnane	7 – Koelsch	4 – Loughnane	Hart Center (831); Worcester, MA
December 7, 2025*; 1:00 pm, FloCollege		Central Connecticut	W 73–56	4–5	18 – Kermoury	12 – Francis	4 – Loughnane	Cabot Center (653); Boston, MA
December 20, 2025*; 4:00 pm, ACCNX		at Syracuse	L 83–91	4–6	20 – Williams	11 – Alarie	7 – Loughnane	JMA Wireless Dome (13,273); Syracuse, NY
December 22, 2025*; 7:00 pm, ESPN+		at Rhode Island	L 77–85	4–7	21 – Williams	8 – Alarie	4 – Williams	Ryan Center (3,585); Kingston, RI
CAA regular season
December 29, 2025; 7:00 pm, FloCollege		at Elon	L 91–103	4–8 (0–1)	23 – Francis	5 – Fritz	6 – Schaller	Schar Center (1,231); Elon, NC
December 31, 2025; 3:00 pm, FloCollege		at North Carolina A&T	W 85–74	5–8 (1–1)	22 – Abreu	4 – Loughnane	4 – Loughnane	Corbett Sports Center (804); Greensboro, NC
January 3, 2026; 12:00 pm, CBSSN		at Campbell	L 82–97	5–9 (1–2)	23 – Loughnane	8 – Francis	7 – Schaller	Gore Arena (2,206); Buies Creek, NC
January 8, 2025; 7:00 pm, NESN+/FloCollege		UNC Wilmington	L 78–87	5–10 (1–3)	21 – Fritz	6 – Francis	6 – Loughnane	Cabot Center (653); Boston, MA
January 10, 2026; 2:00 pm, NESN/FloCollege		Towson	L 78–87	5–11 (1–4)	28 – Kermoury	5 – Kermoury	5 – Kermoury	Cabot Center (797); Boston, MA
January 15, 2026; 7:00 pm, NESN+/FloCollege		Elon	W 85–78	6–11 (2–4)	31 – Kermoury	9 – Pinter	9 – Loughnane	Cabot Center (811); Boston, MA
January 19, 2026; 11:00 am, CBSSN		at Monmouth	L 68–81	6–12 (2–5)	15 – Loughnane	7 – Loughnane	2 – Loughnane	OceanFirst Bank Center (2,313); West Long Branch, NJ
January 22, 2026; 7:00 pm, FloCollege		Stony Brook	L 80–95	6–13 (2–6)	15 – Abreu	6 – Schaller	6 – Loughnane	Cabot Center (652); Boston, MA
January 24, 2026; 2:00 pm, FloCollege		at Drexel	L 78–83	6–14 (2–7)	19 – Abreu	7 – Abreu	4 – Frankel	Daskalakis Athletic Center (2,002); Philadelphia, PA
January 31, 2026; 2:00 pm, NESN/FloCollege		Charleston	L 84–89	6–15 (2–8)	36 – Kermoury	15 – Schaller	6 – Schaller	Cabot Center (912); Boston, MA
February 5, 2026; 7:00 pm, FloCollege		at Hofstra	L 63–80	6–16 (2–9)	16 – Abreu	9 – Schaller	5 – Kermoury	Mack Sports Complex (1,773); Hempstead, NY
February 7, 2026; 4:00 pm, FloCollege		at Stony Brook	L 55–69	6–17 (2–10)	17 – Loughnane	7 – Schaller	2 – Williams	Stony Brook Arena (2,197); Stony Brook, NY
February 12, 2026; 7:00 pm, NESN/FloCollege		William & Mary	L 67–94	6–18 (2–11)	24 – Abreu	7 – Fritz	5 – Frankel	Cabot Center (713); Boston, MA
February 19, 2026; 7:00 pm, NESN/FloCollege		Drexel	L 61–70	6–19 (2–12)	19 – Abreu	7 – Fritz	3 – Kermoury	Cabot Center (812); Boston, MA
February 21, 2026; 2:00 pm, NESN+/FloCollege		Hofstra	L 68–82	6–20 (2–13)	17 – Kermoury	11 – Fritz	6 – Loughnane	Cabot Center (912); Boston, MA
February 26, 2026; 6:00 pm, FloCollege		at William & Mary	L 77–84	6–21 (2–14)	29 – Williams	12 – Fritz	9 – Loughnane	Kaplan Arena (4,319); Williamsburg, VA
February 28, 2026; 4:00 pm, FloCollege		at Hampton	L 65–76	6–22 (2–15)	13 – Kermoury	10 – Kermoury	3 – Fritz	Hampton Convocation Center (1,897); Hampton, VA
March 3, 2026; 7:00 pm, FloCollege		Monmouth	L 83–89	6–23 (2–16)	22 – Loughnane	7 – Fritz	9 – Frankel	Cabot Center (513); Boston, MA
CAA tournament
March 6, 2026; 2:00 pm, FloCollege	(13)	vs. (12) North Carolina A&T; First Round	W 88–72	7–23	18 – Tied	7 – Fritz	6 – Loughnane	CareFirst Arena (1,240); Washington, D.C.
March 7, 2026; 2:00 pm, FloCollege	(13)	vs. (5) Drexel; Second Round	L 77–84	7–24	29 – Loughnane	7 – Koelsch	6 – Loughnane	CareFirst Arena (1,557); Washington, D.C.
*Non-conference game. ^{#}Rankings from AP Poll. (#) Tournament seedings in parentheses. All times are in Eastern.
