= 2025–26 Stony Brook Seawolves men's basketball team =

American college basketball season

2025–26 Stony Brook Seawolves men's basketball
- Conference: Coastal Athletic Association
- Record: 17–15 (9–9 CAA)
- Head coach: Geno Ford (7th season)
- Associate head coach: Andy Hipsher
- Assistant coaches: Jaden Uken; Mark Dixon
- Home arena: Stony Brook Arena

2025–26 CAA men's basketball standings
	Conf.				Overall
Team	W		L	PCT	W		L	PCT
UNC Wilmington	15	–	3	.833	26	–	5	.839
Charleston	14	–	4	.778	21	–	10	.677
Hofstra	12	–	6	.667	21	–	10	.677
Monmouth	11	–	7	.611	17	–	14	.548
Drexel	10	–	8	.556	17	–	15	.531
William & Mary	10	–	8	.556	20	–	11	.645
Towson	9	–	9	.500	18	–	14	.563
Stony Brook	9	–	9	.500	17	–	15	.531
Campbell	8	–	10	.444	15	–	17	.469
Hampton	7	–	11	.389	13	–	19	.406
Elon	6	–	12	.333	14	–	18	.438
North Carolina A&T	4	–	14	.222	11	–	19	.367
Northeastern	2	–	16	.111	7	–	24	.226
† 2026 CAA tournament winner As of March 7, 2026

The 2025–26 Stony Brook Seawolves men's basketball team represented Stony Brook University during the 2025–26 NCAA Division I men's basketball season. The Seawolves, led by seventh-year head coach Geno Ford, played their home games at Stony Brook Arena located in Stony Brook, New York as members of the Coastal Athletic Association.

== Previous season ==
The Seawolves finished the 2024–25 season 8–24, 4–14 in CAA play, to finish in 13th place. They were defeated by Delaware in the first round of the CAA tournament.

== Preseason ==
On October 2, 2025, the CAA released their preseason coaches poll. Stony Brook was picked to finish eleventh in the conference.

=== Preseason rankings ===
CAA Preseason Poll
Place	Team	Points
1	Towson	136 (7)
2	UNC Wilmington	132 (5)
3	Charleston	130 (1)
4	William & Mary	93
5	Hampton	80
6	Monmouth	76
7	Campbell	75
T-8	Hofstra	66
T-8	Northeastern	66
10	Drexel	63
11	Stony Brook	41
12	Elon	35
13	North Carolina A&T	17
(#) first-place votes

=== Preseason All-CAA Teams ===
Preseason All-CAA Second Team
Player	Year	Position
Collin O'Connor	Sophomore	Guard

== Roster ==
2025–26 Stony Brook Seawolves men's basketball team
Players
Coaches

Pos.	#	Name	Height	Weight	Year	Previous school	Hometown
G	1	Erik Pratt	6 ft 5 in (1.96 m)	185 lb (84 kg)	GS	Milwaukee	Lake Worth Beach, Florida
G	2	Rob Brown III	6 ft 4 in (1.93 m)	195 lb (88 kg)	GS	Nicholls	Albany, New York
G	4	Toby Onyekonwu	6 ft 2 in (1.88 m)	170 lb (77 kg)	Sr	Joliet West High School	Joliet, Illinois
G	5	Jonah Butler	6 ft 6 in (1.98 m)	210 lb (95 kg)	Fr	Calloway County High School	Murray, Kentucky
G	6	Liam Dagostino	6 ft 5 in (1.96 m)	180 lb (82 kg)	Fr	Canterbury School	Saratoga, New York
G	7	Ethan Simmon	6 ft 5 in (1.96 m)	205 lb (93 kg)	Sr	New Haven	Edison, New Jersey
F	10	Andrew Okafor	6 ft 8 in (2.03 m)	205 lb (93 kg)	Fr	Archbishop McCarthy High School	Pembroke Pines, Florida
G	11	Jake Harbatkin	6 ft 3 in (1.91 m)	185 lb (84 kg)	Fr	Olympic Heights High School	West Palm Beach, Florida
F	12	Richard Goods	6 ft 9 in (2.06 m)	225 lb (102 kg)	So	Hampton	Greensboro, North Carolina
G	13	Collin O'Connor	6 ft 3 in (1.91 m)	195 lb (88 kg)	So	Western Reserve Academy	Dayton, Ohio
F	15	Quin Gorman	6 ft 8 in (2.03 m)	210 lb (95 kg)	So	Flint Hill School	Falls Church, Virginia
F	17	Oleg Kojenets	7 ft 0 in (2.13 m)	228 lb (103 kg)	GS	Wyoming	Kaunas, Lithuania
F	21	Tomas Valentiny	6 ft 6 in (1.98 m)	201 lb (91 kg)	Fr	Lions Jindřichův Hradec	Žilina, Slovakia
G	29	Andrej Shoshkikj	6 ft 2 in (1.88 m)	182 lb (83 kg)	Fr	KK Rabotnički	Skopje, North Macedonia
F	33	Leon Nahar	6 ft 10 in (2.08 m)	218 lb (99 kg)	Jr	Asheville School	Alkmaar, Netherlands

Head coach

- Geno Ford (Ohio)

Assistant coach(es)

- Andy Hipsher (Akron)
- Jaden Uken (Nebraska)
- Mark Dixon (FIU)

Legend

- (C) Team captain
- (S) Suspended
- (I) Ineligible
- (W) Walk-on
- Injured
- Current redshirt

Roster
Last update: October 17, 2025

== Schedule and results ==
Date time, TV	Rank^{#}	Opponent^{#}	Result	Record	Site (attendance) city, state
Non-conference regular season
November 3, 2025*; 6:31 pm, FloCollege		Farmingdale State	W 66–59	1–0	Stony Brook Arena (1,876); Stony Brook, NY
November 8, 2025*; 5:00 pm, FloCollege		Maine	W 71–60	2–0	Stony Brook Arena (1,803); Stony Brook, NY
November 11, 2025*; 6:31 pm, FloCollege		St. Joseph's–Long Island	W 107–43	3–0	Stony Brook Arena (1,377); Stony Brook, NY
November 15, 2025*; 1:00 pm, ESPN+		at Yale	L 79–86	3–1	John J. Lee Amphitheater (1,153); New Haven, CT
November 20, 2025*; 6:31 pm, FloCollege		Brown	W 80–70	4–1	Stony Brook Arena (1,243); Stony Brook, NY
November 24, 2025*; 11:30 am, BallerTV		vs. Pacific; Sunshine Slam Ocean Bracket Semifinals	L 58–86	4–2	Ocean Center; Daytona Beach, FL
November 25, 2025*; 11:00 am, BallerTV		vs. Bethune–Cookman; Sunshine Slam Ocean Bracket Consolation Game	W 61–54	5–2	Ocean Center; Daytona Beach, FL
November 28, 2025*; 10:00 pm, ESPN+		at Loyola Marymount; Sunshine Slam campus site game	W 71–68	6–2	Gersten Pavilion (784); Los Angeles, CA
December 6, 2025*; 2:00 pm, ESPN+		at Duquesne	L 75–84	6–3	UPMC Cooper Fieldhouse (2,104); Pittsburgh, PA
December 9, 2025*; 7:00 pm, FloCollege		Columbia	W 77–73 ^{OT}	7–3	Stony Brook Arena (1,196); Stony Brook, NY
December 13, 2025*; 12:00 pm, FloCollege		Central Michigan	W 78–55	8–3	Stony Brook Arena (1,314); Stony Brook, NY
December 17, 2025*; 7:00 pm, FloCollege		Albany	L 55–71	8–4	Stony Brook Arena (1,250); Stony Brook, NY
December 21, 2025*; 1:00 pm, ESPN+		at Marist	L 51–70	8–5	McCann Arena (1,322); Poughkeepsie, NY
CAA regular season
December 29, 2025; 7:00 pm, FloCollege		at Hampton	L 59–62	8–6 (0–1)	Hampton Convocation Center (579); Hampton, VA
December 31, 2025; 2:00 pm, CBSSN		at William & Mary	L 57–76	8–7 (0–2)	Kaplan Arena (3,455); Williamsburg, VA
January 3, 2026; 4:00 pm, FloCollege		North Carolina A&T	W 81–80	9–7 (1–2)	Stony Brook Arena (1,740); Stony Brook, NY
January 8, 2026; 7:00 pm, FloCollege		at Drexel	L 37-56	9-8 (1-3)	Daskalakis Athletic Center (936); Philadelphia, PA
January 10, 2026; 6:00 pm, FloCollege		UNC Wilmington	L 71-75	9-9 (1-4)	Stony Brook Arena (1845); Stony Brook, NY
January 15, 2026; 7:00 pm, FloCollege		Hofstra; Battle of Long Island	W 76-71	10-9 (2-4)	Stony Brook Arena (1890); Stony Brook, NY
January 17, 2026; 4:00 pm, FloCollege		Charleston	W 112–106	11–9 (3–4)	Stony Brook Arena (1,815); Stony Brook, NY
January 22, 2026; 7:00 pm, FloCollege		at Northeastern	W 95–80	12–9 (4–4)	Cabot Center (652); Boston, MA
January 29, 2026; 7:00 pm, FloCollege		at Campbell	W 81–69	13–9 (5–4)	Gore Arena (1,411); Buies Creek, NC
January 31, 2026; 7:00 pm, FloCollege		at Elon	W 72–68	14–9 (6–4)	Schar Center (1,161); Elon, NC
February 5, 2026; 7:00 pm, FloCollege		Monmouth	L 75–76	14–10 (6–5)	Stony Brook Arena (1,768); Stony Brook, NY
February 7, 2026; 4:00 pm, FloCollege		Northeastern	W 69–55	15–10 (7–5)	Stony Brook Arena (2,197); Stony Brook, NY
February 12, 2026; 7:00 pm, FloCollege		at Towson	L 57–69	15–11 (7–6)	TU Arena (2,642); Towson, MD
February 16, 2026; 8:00 pm, CBSSN		Drexel	W 72–69	16–11 (8–6)	Stony Brook Arena (2,530); Stony Brook, NY
February 21, 2026; 4:00 pm, FloCollege		Hampton	W 79–72	17–11 (9–6)	Stony Brook Arena (2,433); Stony Brook, NY
February 26, 2026; 7:00 pm, FloCollege		at Monmouth	L 69–82	17–12 (9–7)	OceanFirst Bank Center (1,637); West Long Branch, NJ
February 28, 2026; 7:00 pm, FloCollege		at Hofstra; Battle of Long Island	L 58–67	17–13 (9–8)	Mack Sports Complex (2,516); Hempstead, NY
March 3, 2026; 6:31 pm, FloCollege		Towson	L 57–69	17–14 (9–9)	Stony Brook Arena (2,521); Stony Brook, NY
CAA tournament
March 7, 2026; 12:00 pm, FloCollege	(8)	vs. (9) Campbell; Second round	L 85–96	17–15	CareFirst Arena; Washington, D.C.
*Non-conference game. ^{#}Rankings from AP Poll. (#) Tournament seedings in parentheses. All times are in Eastern.
