= 2025–26 Hofstra Pride men's basketball team =

American college basketball season

2025–26 Hofstra Pride men's basketball
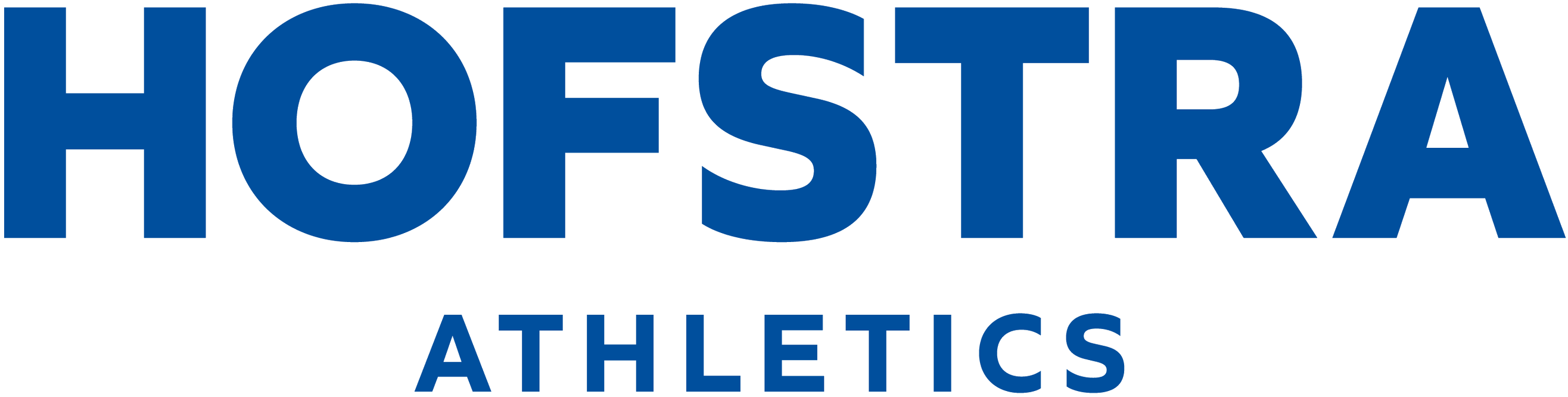

CAA tournament champions

NCAA tournament, First round
- Conference: Coastal Athletic Association
- Record: 24–11 (12–6 CAA)
- Head coach: Speedy Claxton (5th season)
- Associate head coach: Mike DePaoli
- Assistant coaches: Tom Parrotta; Antwon Portley; Drew Metz
- Home arena: Mack Sports Complex

2025–26 CAA men's basketball standings
	Conf.				Overall
Team	W		L	PCT	W		L	PCT
UNC Wilmington	15	–	3	.833	27	–	7	.794
Charleston	14	–	4	.778	21	–	11	.656
Hofstra †	12	–	6	.667	24	–	11	.686
Monmouth	11	–	7	.611	19	–	15	.559
Drexel	10	–	8	.556	17	–	16	.515
William & Mary	10	–	8	.556	20	–	12	.625
Towson	9	–	9	.500	19	–	15	.559
Stony Brook	9	–	9	.500	17	–	15	.531
Campbell	8	–	10	.444	16	–	18	.471
Hampton	7	–	11	.389	13	–	19	.406
Elon	6	–	12	.333	14	–	18	.438
North Carolina A&T	4	–	14	.222	11	–	19	.367
Northeastern	2	–	16	.111	7	–	24	.226
† 2026 CAA tournament winner

The 2025–26 Hofstra Pride men's basketball team represented Hofstra University during the 2025–26 NCAA Division I men's basketball season. The Pride, led by fifth-year head coach Speedy Claxton, played their home games at the Mack Sports Complex in Hempstead, New York as members of the Coastal Athletic Association.

== Previous season ==
The Pride finished the 2024–25 season 15–18, 6–12 in CAA play, to finish in eleventh place. They defeated North Carolina A&T in the first round of the CAA tournament, before falling to Monmouth in the second round.

== Preseason ==
On October 2, 2025, the CAA released their preseason coaches poll. Hofstra was picked to finish tied for eighth in the conference.

=== Preseason rankings ===
CAA Preseason Poll
Place	Team	Points
1	Towson	136 (7)
2	UNC Wilmington	132 (5)
3	Charleston	130 (1)
4	William & Mary	93
5	Hampton	80
6	Monmouth	76
7	Campbell	75
T-8	Hofstra	66
T-8	Northeastern	66
10	Drexel	63
11	Stony Brook	41
12	Elon	35
13	North Carolina A&T	17
(#) first-place votes

=== Preseason All-CAA Teams ===
Preseason All-CAA First Team
Player	Year	Position
Cruz Davis	Junior	Guard

== Roster ==
2025–26 Hofstra Pride men's basketball team
Players
Coaches

Pos.	#	Name	Height	Weight	Year	Previous school	Hometown
G	0	Biggie Patterson	6 ft 7 in (2.01 m)	204 lb (93 kg)	Sr	Iona	Richmond, Virginia
G	1	Preston Edmead	6 ft 1 in (1.85 m)	170 lb (77 kg)	Fr	Williston Northampton School	Deer Park, New York
G	2	A.J. Wills	6 ft 0 in (1.83 m)	160 lb (73 kg)	Jr	Wyoming	Richmond, Virginia
G	3	Trey Boyd III	6 ft 4 in (1.93 m)	185 lb (84 kg)	Jr	Pace	Durham, North Carolina
F	4	Joshua DeCady	6 ft 8 in (2.03 m)	220 lb (100 kg)	So	Kimball Union Academy	Queens Village, New York
G	5	Cruz Davis	6 ft 3 in (1.91 m)	170 lb (77 kg)	Jr	St. John's	Plano, Texas
F/C	6	Victory Onuetu	6 ft 10 in (2.08 m)	235 lb (107 kg)	Jr	IES Fuente Lucena	Alhaurín el Grande, Spain
G	7	Jaeden Roberts	6 ft 3 in (1.91 m)	160 lb (73 kg)	Fr	Putnam Science Academy	Boston, Massachusetts
G	8	Carlos Lopez	6 ft 1 in (1.85 m)	180 lb (82 kg)	Jr	Saint Francis (PA)	Atlantic City, New Jersey
G	11	Amir Williams	6 ft 4 in (1.93 m)	195 lb (88 kg)	So	Neumann Goretti High School	Newark, Delaware
G	15	Joshua Aaron Reaves	6 ft 3 in (1.91 m)	195 lb (88 kg)	GS	UIC	Hamden, Connecticut
F/C	17	Alex Tsynkevich	6 ft 10 in (2.08 m)	245 lb (111 kg)	GS	Kentucky Wesleyan	Minsk, Belarus
G	25	German Plotnikov	6 ft 5 in (1.96 m)	200 lb (91 kg)	GS	North Platte Community College	Minsk, Belarus
F	33	Silas Sunday	7 ft 0 in (2.13 m)	282 lb (128 kg)	Sr	Iona	Lucan, Ireland
G	55	Brandon Morgan	6 ft 4 in (1.93 m)	190 lb (86 kg)	Sr	Western Carolina	Greensboro, North Carolina

Head coach

- Speedy Claxton (Hofstra)

Assistant coach(es)

- Mike DePaoli (Saint Rose)
- Tom Parrotta (Fordham)
- Antwon Portley (Fordham)
- Drew Metz (St. John's)

Legend

- (C) Team captain
- (S) Suspended
- (I) Ineligible
- (W) Walk-on
- Injured
- Current redshirt

Roster
Last update: October 15, 2025

== Schedule and results ==
Date time, TV	Rank^{#}	Opponent^{#}	Result	Record	Site (attendance) city, state
Non-conference regular season
November 3, 2025*; 8:00 pm, ESPN+		at UCF	L 78–82	0–1	Addition Financial Arena (6,029); Orlando, FL
November 7, 2025*; 7:00 pm, ESPN+		at Iona	L 73–81	0–2	Hynes Athletics Center (2,327); New Rochelle, NY
November 10, 2025*; 11:30 am, FloCollege		Molloy	W 95–61	1–2	Mack Sports Complex (2,432); Hempstead, NY
November 14, 2025*; 7:00 pm, ESPN+		at Bucknell	W 83–77	2–2	Sojka Pavilion (1,232); Lewisburg, PA
November 19, 2025*; 7:00 p.m., ESPN+		at Temple	L 76–81	2–3	Liacouras Center (2,442); Philadelphia, PA
November 28, 2025*; 2:00 pm, ESPN+		vs. La Salle; Cathedral Classic	W 63–58	3–3	Palestra; Philadelphia, PA
November 29, 2025*; 2:00 pm, ESPN+		vs. Merrimack; Cathedral Classic	W 78–58	4–3	Palestra (1,989); Philadelphia, PA
November 30, 2025*; 2:30 pm, ESPN+		at Penn; Cathedral Classic	W 77−60	5−3	Palestra (973); Philadelphia, PA
December 3, 2025*; 7:00 pm, ESPN+		at Columbia	L 70–72	5–4	Levien Gymnasium (671); New York, NY
December 7, 2025*; 4:00 pm, ACCN		at Pittsburgh	W 80–73	6–4	Petersen Events Center (4,660); Pittsburgh, PA
December 10, 2025*; 7:00 pm, FloCollege		Old Westbury	W 92–23	7–4	Mack Sports Complex (1,212); Hempstead, NY
December 13, 2025*; 4:00 pm, ACCN		at Syracuse	W 70–69	8–4	JMA Wireless Dome (13,282); Syracuse, NY
December 21, 2025*; 1:00 pm, FloCollege		Quinnipiac	W 74–66	9–4	Mack Sports Complex (2,267); Hempstead, NY
CAA regular season
December 29, 2025; 7:00 pm, FloCollege		Campbell	W 86–72	10–4 (1–0)	Mack Sports Complex (1,935); Hempstead, NY
January 3, 2025; 2:00 pm, FloCollege		at Drexel	W 70–67	11–4 (2–0)	Daskalakis Athletic Center (882); Philadelphia, PA
January 8, 2026; 12:30 pm, FloCollege		at Towson	W 78–67	12–4 (3–0)	TU Arena (2,103); Towson, MD
January 10, 2026; 2:00 pm, FloCollege		Monmouth	W 67–64	13–4 (4–0)	Mack Sports Complex (1,796); Hempstead, NY
January 15, 2026; 7:00 pm, FloCollege		at Stony Brook; Battle of Long Island	L 71–76	13–5 (4–1)	Stony Brook Arena (1,890); Stony Brook, NY
January 17, 2026; 12:00 pm, CBSSN		Elon	L 85–89	13–6 (4–2)	Mack Sports Complex (1,721); Hempstead, NY
January 22, 2026; 7:00 pm, FloCollege		at North Carolina A&T	L 78–79	13–7 (4–3)	Corbett Sports Center (5,405); Greensboro, NC
January 24, 2026; 2:00 pm, FloCollege		at William & Mary	L 82–89	13–8 (4–4)	Kaplan Arena (4,095); Williamsburg, VA
January 29, 2026; 7:00 pm, FloCollege		Charleston	L 64–66	13–9 (4–5)	Mack Sports Complex (1,444); Hempstead, NY
January 31, 2026; 2:00 pm, FloCollege		at Monmouth	W 73–57	14–9 (5–5)	OceanFirst Bank Center (2,572); West Long Branch, NJ
February 5, 2026; 7:00 pm, FloCollege		Northeastern	W 80–63	15–9 (6–5)	Mack Sports Complex (1,773); Hempstead, NY
February 7, 2026; 4:00 pm, CBSSN		Towson	W 71–49	16–9 (7–5)	Mack Sports Complex (3,525); Hempstead, NY
February 12, 2026; 7:00 p.m., FloCollege		at Charleston	W 66–62	17–9 (8–5)	TD Arena (4,611); Charleston, SC
February 14, 2026; 4:00 p.m., CBSSN		at UNC Wilmington	L 66–70	17–10 (8–6)	Trask Coliseum (5,220); Wilmington, NC
February 19, 2026; 8:00 pm, CBSSN		Hampton	W 79–43	18–10 (9–6)	Mack Sports Complex (1,921); Hempstead, NY
February 21, 2026; 2:00 pm, FloCollege		at Northeastern	W 82–68	19–10 (10–6)	Cabot Center (912); Boston, MA
February 28, 2026; 7:00 pm, MSG2/FloCollege		Stony Brook; Battle of Long Island	W 67–58	20–10 (11–6)	Mack Sports Complex (2,516); Hempstead, NY
March 3, 2026; 7:00 pm, FloCollege		Drexel	W 62–51	21–10 (12–6)	Mack Sports Complex (1,402); Hempstead, NY
CAA tournament
March 8, 2026; 8:30 pm, FloHoops	(3)	vs. (6) William & Mary; Quarterfinal	W 92–61	22–10	CareFirst Arena; Washington, D.C.
March 9, 2026; 8:30 pm, CBSSN	(3)	vs. (7) Towson; Semifinal	W 68–65 ^{OT}	23–10	CareFirst Arena (1,582); Washington, D.C.
March 10, 2026; 7:00 pm, CBSSN	(3)	vs. (4) Monmouth; Championship	W 75–69	24–10	CareFirst Arena (1,359); Washington, D.C.
NCAA tournament
March 20, 2026; 3:15 p.m., TruTV	(13 MW)	vs. (4 MW) No. 18 Alabama; First round	L 70–90	24–11	Benchmark International Arena (17,769); Tampa, FL
*Non-conference game. ^{#}Rankings from AP Poll. (#) Tournament seedings in parentheses. MW=Midwest. All times are in Eastern.
