= Landry Kosmalski =

American basketball coach

Campbell Fighting Camels
- Title: Associate head coach
- League: Coastal Athletic Association

Personal information
- Born: May 1, 1978 (age 48) Nashville, Tennessee, U.S.
- Listed height: 6 ft 7 in (2.01 m)
- Listed weight: 215 lb (98 kg)

Career information
- High school: Trinity (Euless, Texas)
- College: Davidson (1996–2000)
- NBA draft: 2000: undrafted
- Playing career: 2000–2004
- Position: Small forward
- Coaching career: 2004–present

Career history

Playing
- 2000–2002: 08 Stockholm
- 2002–2003: Södertälje Kings
- 2003–2004: Valence Condom Gers Basket

Coaching
- 2004–2006: Davidson (assistant)
- 2006–2007: 08 Stockholm (development team)
- 2007–2009: Webb School of Knoxville
- 2009–2012: Davidson (assistant)
- 2012–2025: Swarthmore
- 2025–present: Campbell (AHC)

Career highlights
- As player: Swedish Basketligan champion (2001); As coach: NABC Division III Coach of the Year (2020); 4× Centennial Conference Coach of the Year (2016, 2017, 2019, 2020)

Landry Kosmalski (born May 1, 1978) is an American basketball coach and former player. He is currently the associate head coach at Campbell University.

== Early life ==
Growing up, Kosmalski studied books on the Boston Celtics under coach Red Auerbach, and was impressed that the team only used seven plays. Kosmalski attended Trinity in Euless, Texas, where he was a Texas Sports Writers Association All-State First Team honoree as a senior. Kosmalski was also named Northeast Tarrant County Co-Player of the Year alongside teammate Dylan Osean. Kosmalski averaged 20 points and 13 rebounds per game during his senior season, and he had 34 points and 26 rebounds in two playoff games.

== College career ==
Kosmalski played college basketball at Davidson under Bob McKillop from 1996 to 2000. Kosmalski was named the Southern Conference Freshman of the Year in 1997. As a sophomore, he helped lead the team to the NCAA Tournament but was slowed by tendonitis. He was named to the All-Southern Conference First Team in 1999 and 2000. Kosmalski averaged 13.9 points and 8.6 rebounds per game during his junior season. As a senior, Kosmalski was ranked the 18th best small forward by one publication, and had 17 points and 11 rebounds against Wake Forest.

Kosmalski finished his Davidson career 4th all-time in rebounding (877), 17th in scoring (1,438), and 12th in steals (121), and in 2014 he was inducted into the Davidson Athletic Hall of Fame.

== Professional career ==
Between 2000 and 2004, Kosmalski played professionally in Sweden and France.

== Coaching career ==
=== Davidson (2004–2006) ===
Kosmalski began his coaching career in 2004 as an assistant at Davidson under Bob McKillop. Kosmalski helped lead the Wildcats to the NCAA Tournament in 2006 as well as a Southern Conference championship. He said that he met Stephen Curry at a summer camp and watched him in high school but was not actively involved in his recruiting to Davidson.

=== 08 Stockholm Human Rights (2006–2007) ===
In the 2006–07 season, Kosmalski left to become the head coach of the 08 Stockholm Human Rights developmental team and assistant coach of the senior team.

=== Webb School of Knoxville (2007–2009) ===
Kosmalski accepted a job as head basketball coach and dean of students at The Webb School of Knoxville in Knoxville, Tennessee. He was responsible for maintaining discipline and improved the team's win record by nine games in his second season.

=== Return to Davidson (2009–2012) ===
In 2009, Kosmalski returned to Davidson as an assistant after Matt Matheny left to become the head coach at Elon. Responsible for developing big men, he helped De'Mon Brooks and Jake Cohen be named the 2012 Southern Conference player of the year by the coaches and media, respectively. Kosmalski helped Davidson win the Southern Conference and reach the NCAA Tournament in 2012, and he helped the Wildcats achieve an overall record of 102–58 in his two stints there.

=== Swarthmore (2012–2025) ===
In May 2012, Kosmalski was named head basketball coach at Swarthmore College. When he arrived, Kosmalski envisioned Swarthmore, which had not won a conference title since 1951, becoming one of the best Division III programs and sent letters to this effect to recruits. He inherited a 3–22 team, and he briefly benched the program's leading scorer after he arrived. In Koswalski's first season, the Garnet won seven games, eight games in his second and 11 games in his third. Before the 2015–16 season, Koswalski recruited Swarthmore's first All-American, Cam Wiley, and the program showed immediate improvement, winning 22 games. The Garnet finished second in their conference and broke an 18-year streak of losing records. He earned his first Centennial Conference Coach of the Year honors.

The following year, they had 23 wins and won the conference championship, reaching the second round of its first NCAA tournament. They won 25 games and reached a regional final in 2017–18, finishing as one of the top defensive teams. In the 2018–19 season the Garnet reached the title game, where they lost to Wisconsin–Oshkosh.

After listening to a TED talk by Shawn Achor, author of “The Happiness Advantage”, Kosmalski decided to apply his principles of positivity leading to a more productive work environment. In the 2019–20 season, the team was ranked preseason No. 1 by d3hoops.com. Swarthmore began the season 26–0 before losing to eighth-ranked Johns Hopkins in the Centennial Conference championship game. The team's leading scorer and rebounder was Zac O’Dell, who published an article in the journal Environmental Science & Technology entitled “In Situ Quantification of Silver Nanoparticle Dissolution Kinetics in Simulated Sweat Using Linear Sweep Stripping Voltammetry.” The team finished the season 28–1 after the remainder of the NCAA Tournament was cancelled due to the coronavirus pandemic. Kosmalski was named the NCAA Division III National Coach of the Year, which he called a "team honor".

=== Campbell (2025–present) ===
In March 2025, Kosmalski announced that he would be departing from Swarthmore to become the associate head coach at Campbell University under new head coach John Andrzejek.

== Personal life ==
Kosmalski is the son of Len Kosmalski, who played collegiately at Tennessee, then played professionally with the NBA's Chicago Bulls and Kansas City Kings as well as in Europe. Landry's younger brother Logan played collegiately at Baylor for two years before transferring to Davidson.

Kosmalski's wife Lauren Santi was a former cheerleader at the University of Alabama and also worked in Davidson's office of sports information. They have three children named Lincoln, Bexley, and Larkin.

== Head coaching record ==
Record table
| Season | Team | Overall | Conference | Standing | Postseason |
|---|---|---|---|---|---|
Swarthmore (Centennial Conference) (2012–present)
| 2012–13 | Swarthmore | 7–18 | 6–12 | | |
| 2013–14 | Swarthmore | 8–17 | 5–13 | | |
| 2014–15 | Swarthmore | 11–14 | 7–11 | | |
| 2015–16 | Swarthmore | 22–8 | 13–5 | | |
| 2016–17 | Swarthmore | 23–6 | 14–4 | | NCAA Division III Second Round |
| 2017–18 | Swarthmore | 25–6 | 15–3 | | NCAA Division III Elite Eight |
| 2018–19 | Swarthmore | 29–4 | 15–3 | | NCAA Division III Runner-up |
| 2019–20 | Swarthmore | 28–1 | 18–0 | | NCAA Division III Sweet 16* |
| Swarthmore: | | 153–74 (.674) | 93–51 (.646) | | |
| Total: | | 170–59 (.742) | | | |
National champion Postseason invitational champion Conference regular season champion Conference regular season and conference tournament champion Division regular season champion Division regular season and conference tournament champion Conference tournament champion
