= 2025–26 Towson Tigers men's basketball team =

American college basketball season

2025–26 Towson Tigers men's basketball
- Conference: Coastal Athletic Association
- Record: 19–15 (9–9 CAA)
- Head coach: Pat Skerry (15th season)
- Associate head coach: Pat O'Connell; Parfait Bitee
- Assistant coaches: Chris Conway; John Auslander; Beruk Asfaw
- Home arena: TU Arena

2025–26 CAA men's basketball standings
	Conf.				Overall
Team	W		L	PCT	W		L	PCT
UNC Wilmington	15	–	3	.833	26	–	6	.813
Charleston	14	–	4	.778	21	–	11	.656
Hofstra	12	–	6	.667	22	–	10	.688
Monmouth	11	–	7	.611	18	–	14	.563
Drexel	10	–	8	.556	17	–	16	.515
William & Mary	10	–	8	.556	20	–	12	.625
Towson	9	–	9	.500	19	–	14	.576
Stony Brook	9	–	9	.500	17	–	15	.531
Campbell	8	–	10	.444	16	–	17	.485
Hampton	7	–	11	.389	13	–	19	.406
Elon	6	–	12	.333	14	–	18	.438
North Carolina A&T	4	–	14	.222	11	–	19	.367
Northeastern	2	–	16	.111	7	–	24	.226
† 2026 CAA tournament winner As of March 8, 2026

The 2025–26 Towson Tigers men's basketball team represented Towson University during the 2025–26 NCAA Division I men's basketball season. The Tigers, led by 15th-year head coach Pat Skerry, played their home games at TU Arena in Towson, Maryland as members of the Coastal Athletic Association.

== Previous season ==
The Tigers finished the 2024–25 season 22–11, 16–2 in CAA play, to finish as CAA regular season champions. They defeated Drexel in the quarterfinals of the CAA tournament, before being upset by #12 seed Delaware in the semifinals.

== Preseason ==
On October 2, 2025, the CAA released their preseason coaches poll. Towson was picked to finish first in the conference, while receiving seven first-place votes.

=== Preseason rankings ===
CAA Preseason Poll
Place	Team	Points
1	Towson	136 (7)
2	UNC Wilmington	132 (5)
3	Charleston	130 (1)
4	William & Mary	93
5	Hampton	80
6	Monmouth	76
7	Campbell	75
T-8	Hofstra	66
T-8	Northeastern	66
10	Drexel	63
11	Stony Brook	41
12	Elon	35
13	North Carolina A&T	17
(#) first-place votes

=== CAA Preseason Player of the Year ===
CAA Preseason Player of the Year
Player	Year	Position
Tyler Tejada	Junior	Guard/Forward

=== Preseason All-CAA Teams ===
Preseason All-CAA First Team
Player	Year	Position
Tyler Tejada	Junior	Guard/Forward
Dylan Williamson	RS Junior	Guard

== Roster ==
2025–26 Towson Tigers men's basketball team
Players
Coaches

Pos.	#	Name	Height	Weight	Year	Previous school	Hometown
G	0	Ryan Conway	6 ft 1 in (1.85 m)	185 lb (84 kg)	RS Sr	Howard Community College	Baltimore, Maryland
G	1	Tyler Schmidt	6 ft 3 in (1.91 m)	205 lb (93 kg)	GS	Valparaiso	Valparaiso, Indiana
G	2	Jaiden Cole	6 ft 4 in (1.93 m)	180 lb (82 kg)	Jr	NBA Academy Latin America	Toronto, Ontario
F	3	Tyler Coleman	6 ft 7 in (2.01 m)	220 lb (100 kg)	RS Sr	Paul VI High School	Woodbridge, Virginia
G	4	Dylan Williamson	6 ft 1 in (1.85 m)	180 lb (82 kg)	RS Jr	Our Lady of Good Counsel High School	Upper Marlboro, Maryland
G	5	Jon Barton	6 ft 2 in (1.88 m)	215 lb (98 kg)	Fr	St. John's College High School	Waldorf, Maryland
F	12	Abdou Samb	6 ft 8 in (2.03 m)	220 lb (100 kg)	RS Sr	IUPUI	Upper Marlboro, Maryland
G/F	13	Chike Ndefo	6 ft 7 in (2.01 m)	215 lb (98 kg)	RS Fr	Vermont Academy	Elmont, New York
G/F	15	Tyler Tejada	6 ft 9 in (2.06 m)	230 lb (104 kg)	Jr	Teaneck High School	Teaneck, New Jersey
G	21	Jack Doumbia Jr.	6 ft 6 in (1.98 m)	205 lb (93 kg)	GS	Wright State	Lanham, Maryland
G	22	Ryan Skerry	6 ft 4 in (1.93 m)	200 lb (91 kg)	Jr	Dulaney High School	Timonium, Maryland
F	23	Caleb Embeya	6 ft 9 in (2.06 m)	235 lb (107 kg)	So	St. Maria Goretti High School	Kinshasa, Democratic Republic of the Congo
G/F	24	Jaquan Womack	6 ft 6 in (1.98 m)	225 lb (102 kg)	Fr	Paul VI High School	Manassas, Virginia
F	30	Brandon Holmes	6 ft 8 in (2.03 m)	230 lb (104 kg)	Fr	Mount Saint Joseph High School	Columbia, Maryland
C	41	Mor Seck	7 ft 0 in (2.13 m)	235 lb (107 kg)	Sr	Fresno State	Ngayene Daour, Senegal

Head coach

- Pat Skerry (Tufts)

Assistant coach(es)

- Pat O'Connell (Johns Hopkins)
- Parfait Bitee (Rhode Island)
- Chris Conway (York College)
- John Auslander (Maryland)
- Beruk Asfaw (Washington)

Legend

- (C) Team captain
- (S) Suspended
- (I) Ineligible
- (W) Walk-on
- Injured
- Current redshirt

Roster
Last update: October 18, 2025

== Schedule and results ==
Date time, TV	Rank^{#}	Opponent^{#}	Result	Record	Site (attendance) city, state
Exhibition
October 18, 2025*; 2:00 pm, ESPN+		at No. 5 St. John's	L 63–73	–	Carnesecca Arena (5,260); Queens, NY
Non-conference regular season
November 3, 2025*; 9:00 pm, MNMT		vs. Loyola (MD); Hall of Fame Series Baltimore	W 67–56	1–0	CFG Bank Arena (3,167); Baltimore, MD
November 8, 2025*; 3:00 pm, ESPN+		at No. 2 Houston	L 48–65	1–1	Fertitta Center (7,035); Houston, TX
November 11, 2025*; 7:30 pm, FloCollege		Wilson	W 101–62	2–1	TU Arena (2,044); Towson, MD
November 14, 2025*; 7:00 pm, FloCollege/MNMT		Norfolk State	W 51–41	3–1	TU Arena (2,323); Towson, MD
November 18, 2025*; 7:00 pm, ESPN+		at James Madison	L 75–81	3–2	Atlantic Union Bank Center (3,072); Harrisonburg, VA
November 24, 2025*; 11:00 am, ESPN2		vs. Rhode Island; ESPN Events Invitational Adventure Bracket quarterfinals	W 62–55	4–2	State Farm Field House; Bay Lake, FL
November 25, 2025*; 12:00 pm, ESPN2		vs. Liberty; ESPN Events Invitational Adventure Bracket semifinals	W 72–69	5–2	State Farm Field House; Bay Lake, FL
November 26, 2025*; 12:00 p.m., ESPN2		vs. UC San Diego; ESPN Events Invitational Adventure Bracket championship game	L 73–87	5–3	State Farm Field House; Bay Lake, FL
December 3, 2025*; 7:00 pm, FloCollege		Cornell	W 93–80	6–3	TU Arena (2,215); Towson, MD
December 7, 2025*; 7:00 pm, ESPN+		at UCF	L 61–86	6–4	Addition Financial Arena (5,346); Orlando, FL
December 16, 2025*; 9:00 pm, ESPN		at No. 17 Kansas	L 49–73	6–5	Allen Fieldhouse (15,300); Lawrence, KS
December 19, 2025*; 6:00 pm, FloCollege		Notre Dame (MD)	W 107–60	7–5	TU Arena (2,022); Towson, MD
December 22, 2025*; 2:00 pm, FloCollege/MNMT		Sacred Heart	W 72–47	8–5	TU Arena (1,115); Towson, MD
CAA regular season
December 29, 2025; 5:00 pm, FloCollege		at William & Mary	L 70–84	8–6 (0–1)	Kaplan Arena (3,509); Williamsburg, VA
December 31, 2025; 2:30 pm, FloCollege		at Hampton	L 62–63	8–7 (0–2)	Hampton Convocation Center (1,548); Hampton, VA
January 3, 2026; 6:00 pm, FloCollege/MNMT		Monmouth	L 48–62	8–8 (0–3)	TU Arena (2,524); Towson, MD
January 8, 2026; 12:30 pm, FloCollege/MNMT		Hofstra	L 67–78	8–9 (0–4)	TU Arena (2,103); Towson, MD
January 10, 2026; 2:00 pm		at Northeastern	W 87–78	9–9 (1–4)	Cabot Center (797); Boston, MA
January 15, 2026; 8:00 pm, CBSSN		Charleston	W 61–52	10–9 (2–4)	TU Arena (1,850); Towson, MD
January 19, 2026; 1:00 pm, CBSSN		Drexel	W 59–58	11–9 (3–4)	TU Arena (3,188); Towson, MD
January 22, 2026; 7:00 pm		at Elon	W 72–59	12–9 (4–4)	Schar Center (1,509); Elon, NC
January 24, 2026; 2:00 pm		at North Carolina A&T	L 73–80	12–10 (4–5)	Corbett Sports Center (526); Greensboro, NC
January 29, 2026; 9:00 pm, CBSSN		UNC Wilmington	L 73–82	12–11 (4–6)	TU Arena (2,801); Towson, MD
January 31, 2026; 2:00 pm, FloCollege/MNMT		Hampton	W 82–50	13–11 (5–6)	TU Arena (3,615); Towson, MD
February 7, 2026; 4:00 pm, CBSSN		at Hofstra	L 49–71	13–12 (5–7)	Mack Sports Complex (3,525); Hempstead, NY
February 12, 2026; 7:00 pm, FloCollege/MNMT		Stony Brook	W 69–57	14–12 (6–7)	TU Arena (2,642); Towson, MD
February 15, 2026; 7:00 pm, CBSSN		at Monmouth	L 71–72	14–13 (6–8)	OceanFirst Bank Center (1,929); West Long Branch, NJ
February 22, 2026; 2:00 pm, CBSSN		at Drexel	L 62–68	14–14 (6–9)	Daskalakis Athletic Center (1,127); Philadelphia, PA
February 26, 2026; 7:00 pm, FloCollege		Elon	W 58–56	15–14 (7–9)	TU Arena (2,599); Towson, MD
February 28, 2026; 2:00 pm, FloCollege/MNMT		Campbell	W 71–67	16–14 (8–9)	TU Arena (3,212); Towson, MD
March 3, 2026; 6:30 pm, FloCollege		at Stony Brook	W 69–57	17–14 (9–9)	Stony Brook Arena (2,521); Stony Brook, NY
CAA tournament
March 7, 2026; 6:00 pm, FloCollege	(7)	vs. (10) Hampton; Second round	W 74–68	18–14	CareFirst Arena (1,770); Washington, D.C.
March 8, 2026; 6:00 pm, FloCollege	(7)	vs. (2) Charleston; Quarterfinals	W 81–56	19–14	CareFirst Arena; Washington, D.C.
March 9, 2026; 8:30 pm, CBSSN	(7)	vs. (3) Hofstra; Semifinals	L 65–68 ^{OT}	19–15	CareFirst Arena (1,582); Washington, D.C.
*Non-conference game. ^{#}Rankings from AP Poll. (#) Tournament seedings in parentheses. All times are in Eastern.
