= 2025–26 William & Mary Tribe men's basketball team =

American college basketball season

2025–26 William & Mary Tribe men's basketball

Jacksonville Classic co-champions
- Conference: Coastal Athletic Association
- Record: 20–12 (10–8 CAA)
- Head coach: Brian Earl (2nd season)
- Assistant coaches: Jimmy Fenerty; Max Ginsberg; Alex Mumphard
- Home arena: Kaplan Arena

2025–26 CAA men's basketball standings
	Conf.				Overall
Team	W		L	PCT	W		L	PCT
UNC Wilmington	15	–	3	.833	27	–	7	.794
Charleston	14	–	4	.778	21	–	11	.656
Hofstra †	12	–	6	.667	24	–	11	.686
Monmouth	11	–	7	.611	19	–	15	.559
Drexel	10	–	8	.556	17	–	16	.515
William & Mary	10	–	8	.556	20	–	12	.625
Towson	9	–	9	.500	19	–	15	.559
Stony Brook	9	–	9	.500	17	–	15	.531
Campbell	8	–	10	.444	16	–	18	.471
Hampton	7	–	11	.389	13	–	19	.406
Elon	6	–	12	.333	14	–	18	.438
North Carolina A&T	4	–	14	.222	11	–	19	.367
Northeastern	2	–	16	.111	7	–	24	.226
† 2026 CAA tournament winner

The 2025–26 William & Mary Tribe men's basketball team represented the College of William & Mary during the 2025–26 NCAA Division I men's basketball season. The Tribe, led by second-year head coach Brian Earl, play their home games at Kaplan Arena in Williamsburg, Virginia as members of the Coastal Athletic Association (CAA).

== Previous season ==
The Tribe finished the 2024–25 season 17–15, 11–7 in CAA play, to finish in fourth place. After having a double bye in the CAA tournament, the team lost to Delaware in their first tournament game played.

== Offseason ==
=== Departures ===
Name	Number	Pos.	Height	Weight	Year	Hometown	Reason for departure
Caleb Dorsey	0	G	6' 8"	230	Senior	Westminster, MD	Graduated
Isaiah Mbeng	1	G	6' 1"	175	Freshman	Potomac, MD	Transferred to East Carolina
Matteus Case	4	G	6' 5"	183	Senior	Pickering, ON	Graduated
Noah Collier	5	F	6' 8"	215	Senior	Mullica Hill, NJ	Transferred to La Salle
Malachi Ndur	10	F	6' 8"	225	Graduate student	Marietta, GA	Graduated
Luke Kinkade	12	G	6' 1"	185	Freshman	Naperville, IL	Left team
Gabe Dorsey	21	F	6' 6"	215	Senior	Westminster, MD	Graduated
Nick Evans	22	F	6' 8"	215	Senior	Alexandria, VA	Graduated
Keller Boothby	22	F	6' 8"	215	Graduate student	Plano, TX	Graduated

=== Incoming transfers ===
Name	Number	Pos.	Height	Weight	Year	Hometown	Previous school
Reese Miller	0	G	6' 5"	165	Junior	Round Rock, TX	Transferred from Blinn College
Cade Haskins	1	F	6' 6"	220	Graduate student	Minneapolis, MN	Transferred from Dartmouth
Ethan Connery	5	G	6' 4"	170	Junior	Cuyahoga Falls, OH	Transferred from Casper
Tunde Vahlberg Fasasi	16	G	6' 8"	210	Junior	Stockholm, Sweden	Transferred from La Salle
Jo'el Emanuel	24	F	6' 6"	205	Graduate student	Suffern, NY	Transferred from Fairleigh Dickinson
Kilian Brockhoff	22	F	6' 9"	230	Junior	Cuxhaven, Germany	Transferred from St. Louis

=== 2025 recruiting class ===
College recruiting
Name	Hometown	School	Height	Weight	Commit date
Kaleb Spencer; F	Manteo, NC	Fork Union Military Academy	6 ft 9 in (2.06 m)	218 lb (99 kg)	May 21, 2025
Kaleb Spencer; F	Recruit ratings: Scout: Rivals: (NR)				
Overall recruit ranking:
Note: In many cases, Scout, Rivals, 247Sports, On3, and ESPN may conflict in their listings of height and weight.; In these cases, the average was taken. ESPN grades are on a 100-point scale.; Sources: "2025 Team Ranking". Rivals.

== Roster ==
2025–26 William & Mary Tribe men's basketball team
Players
Coaches

Pos.	#	Name	Height	Weight	Year	Previous school	Hometown
G	0	Reese Miller	6 ft 5 in (1.96 m)	165 lb (75 kg)	Jr	Blinn College	Round Rock, TX
G	1	Cade Haskins	6 ft 6 in (1.98 m)	220 lb (100 kg)	GS	Dartmouth	Minneapolis, MN
G	2	Chase Lowe	6 ft 5 in (1.96 m)	200 lb (91 kg)	Sr	Weddington High School	Weddington, NC
G	5	Ethan Connery	6 ft 4 in (1.93 m)	170 lb (77 kg)	Jr	Casper	Cuyahoga Falls, OH
G	6	Colin Ndaw	6 ft 3 in (1.91 m)	175 lb (79 kg)	So	IMG Academy	Dakar, Senegal
G	7	Kyle Frazier	6 ft 2 in (1.88 m)	190 lb (86 kg)	Sr	Belmont Abbey	Matthews, NC
G	11	Kyle Pulliam	6 ft 4 in (1.93 m)	185 lb (84 kg)	Sr	St. Thomas Aquinas	Silver Spring, MD
G/F	15	Ryan Jackson	6 ft 6 in (1.98 m)	205 lb (93 kg)	So	AZ Compass Prep School	Mesa, AZ
F	16	Tunde Vahlberg Fasasi	6 ft 8 in (2.03 m)	210 lb (95 kg)	Jr	La Salle	Stockholm, Sweden
F	21	Jo'el Emanuel	6 ft 6 in (1.98 m)	205 lb (93 kg)	GS	Fairleigh Dickinson	Suffern, NY
F	22	Kilian Brockhoff	6 ft 9 in (2.06 m)	230 lb (104 kg)	Jr	St. Louis	Cuxhaven, Germany
F	22	Kaleb Spencer	6 ft 9 in (2.06 m)	218 lb (99 kg)	Fr	Fork Union Military Academy	Manteo, NC
G	25	Miles Hicks	6 ft 0 in (1.83 m)	160 lb (73 kg)	Sr	St. Albans School	Upper Marlboro, MD
F	43	Finn lally	6 ft 8 in (2.03 m)	215 lb (98 kg)	Sr	Trinidad State	Hamilton, New Zealand

Head coach

- Brian Earl (Princeton)

Assistant coach(es)

- Jimmy Fenerty (Dickinson)
- Max Ginsberg (Cornell)
- Alex Mumphard (Greenville)

Legend

- (C) Team captain
- (S) Suspended
- (I) Ineligible
- (W) Walk-on
- Injured
- Current redshirt

Roster
Last update: June 14, 2025

== Schedule and results ==
Date time, TV	Rank^{#}	Opponent^{#}	Result	Record	Site (attendance) city, state
Non-conference regular season
November 3, 2025*; 7:00 pm, FloCollege		Georgian Court	W 110–63	1–0	Kaplan Arena (2,478); Williamsburg, VA
November 8, 2025*; 4:00 pm, ESPN+		at Norfolk State	W 81–78	2–0	Echols Hall (1,863); Norfolk, VA
November 11, 2025*; 7:00 pm, ESPN+/MASN		at Richmond	L 86–90	2–1	Robins Center (4,226); Richmond, VA
November 15, 2025*; 6:00 pm, truTV		at No. 13 St. John's	L 60–93	2–2	Carnesecca Arena (5,260); Queens, NY
November 19, 2025*; 7:00 pm, ESPN+		at Bowling Green	W 82–74	3–2	Stroh Center (1,848); Bowling Green, OH
November 21, 2025*; 11:00 am, FloCollege		Regent	W 104–57	4–2	Kaplan Arena (2,675); Williamsburg, VA
November 24, 2025*; 4:00 pm, PTB Live		vs. UTEP; Jacksonville Classic	W 74–63	5–2	John Hurst Adams Gymnasium (246); Jacksonville, FL
November 25, 2025*; 6:30 pm, PTB Live		vs. Abilene Christian; Jacksonville Classic	W 92–58	6–2	John Hurst Adams Gymnasium (246); Jacksonville, FL
November 30, 2025*; 2:00 pm, FloCollege		Old Dominion; Rivalry	W 88–75	7–2	Kaplan Arena (3,424); Williamsburg, VA
December 2, 2025*; 7:00 pm, ESPN+		at Duquesne	W 83–79	8–2	UPMC Cooper Fieldhouse (2,033); Pittsburgh, PA
December 6, 2025*; 6:00 pm, ESPN+		at George Washington	L 86–99	8–3	Charles E. Smith Center (2,258); Washington, D.C.
December 18, 2025*; 7:00 pm, FloCollege/MASN		Radford	W 96–83	9–3	Kaplan Arena (2,790); Williamsburg, VA
CAA regular season
December 29, 2025; 5:00 pm, FloCollege/MASN		Towson	W 84–70	10–3 (1–0)	Kaplan Arena (3,509); Williamsburg, VA
December 31, 2025; 2:00 pm, CBSSN		Stony Brook	W 76–57	11–3 (2–0)	Kaplan Arena (3,455); Williamsburg, VA
January 5, 2026; 7:00 pm, CBSSN		at Charleston	L 79–88	11–4 (2–1)	TD Arena (4,862); Charleston, SC
January 8, 2026; 7:00 pm, FloCollege		at Monmouth	L 70–81	11–5 (2–2)	OceanFirst Bank Center (1,124); West Long Branch, NJ
January 10, 2026; 2:00 pm, FloCollege		at Drexel	L 58–64	11–6 (2–3)	Daskalakis Athletic Center (1,011); Philadelphia, PA
January 15, 2026; 7:00 pm, FloCollege/MASN		North Carolina A&T	W 97–89	12–6 (3–3)	Kaplan Arena (3,241); Williamsburg, VA
January 22, 2026; 7:00 pm, FloCollege/MASN		UNC Wilmington	W 77–70	13–6 (4–3)	Kaplan Arena (4,205); Williamsburg, VA
January 24, 2026; 2:00 pm, FloCollege/MASN		Hofstra	W 89–82	14–6 (5–3)	Kaplan Arena (4,095); Williamsburg, VA
January 29, 2026; 7:00 pm, FloCollege		at Elon	L 76–79	13–9 (5–4)	Schar Center (1,815); Elon, NC
January 31, 2026; 12:00 pm, CBSSN		Campbell	L 96–104	14–8 (5–5)	Kaplan Arena (4,860); Williamsburg, VA
February 5, 2026; 7:00 pm, CBSSN		at UNC Wilmington	W 85–78	15–8 (6–5)	Trask Coliseum (5,220); Wilmington, NC
February 7, 2026; 2:30 pm, FloCollege		at Hampton	L 74–77	15–9 (6–6)	Hampton Convocation Center (1,293); Hampton, VA
February 12, 2026; 7:00 pm, FloCollege		at Northeastern	W 94–67	16–9 (7–6)	Cabot Center (713); Boston, MA
February 14, 2026; 2:00 pm, FloCollege/MASN		Elon	L 78–81	16–10 (7–7)	Kaplan Arena (5,074); Williamsburg, VA
February 19, 2026; 7:00 pm, FloCollege		at Campbell	L 83–84	16–11 (7–8)	Gore Arena (1,332); Buies Creek, NC
February 26, 2026; 7:00 pm, FloCollege/MASN		Northeastern	W 84–77	17–11 (8–8)	Kaplan Arena (4,319); Williamsburg, VA
February 28, 2026; 2:00 pm, FloCollege		at North Carolina A&T	W 91–88	18–11 (9–8)	Corbett Sports Center (1,109); Greensboro, NC
March 3, 2026; 7:00 pm, FloCollege		Hampton	W 94–85	19–11 (10–8)	Kaplan Arena (4,268); Williamsburg, VA
CAA tournament
March 7, 2026; 8:30 pm, FloCollege	(6)	vs. (11) Elon; Second round	W 72–62	20–11	CareFirst Arena (1,817); Washington, D.C.
March 8, 2026; 8:30 pm, FloCollege	(6)	vs. (3) Hofstra; Quarterfinals	L 61–92	20–12	CareFirst Arena; Washington, D.C.
*Non-conference game. ^{#}Rankings from AP Poll. (#) Tournament seedings in parentheses. All times are in Eastern.
