= 2025–26 Monmouth Hawks men's basketball team =

American college basketball season

2025–26 Monmouth Hawks men's basketball
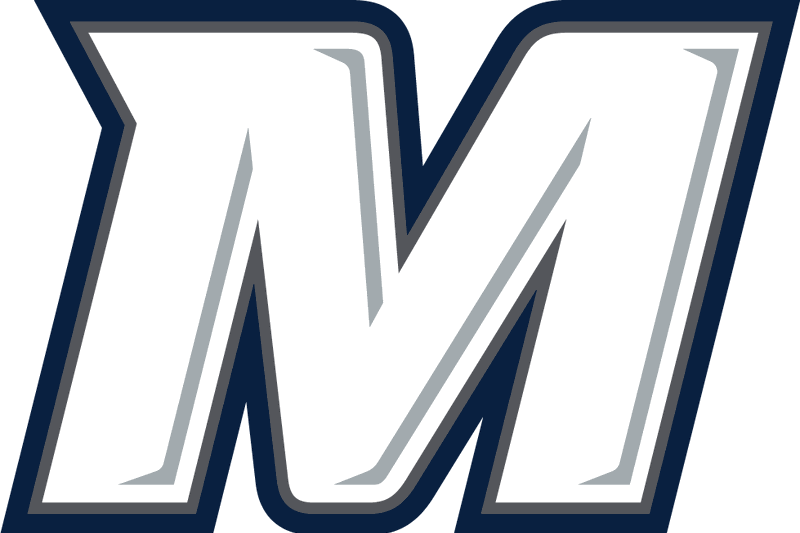
- Conference: Coastal Athletic Association
- Record: 19–15 (11–7 CAA)
- Head coach: King Rice (15th season)
- Assistant coaches: Rick Callahan; Brian Reese; Clive Bentick; Micah Seaborn; Justin Dempsey
- Home arena: OceanFirst Bank Center

2025–26 CAA men's basketball standings
	Conf.				Overall
Team	W		L	PCT	W		L	PCT
UNC Wilmington	15	–	3	.833	26	–	6	.813
Charleston	14	–	4	.778	21	–	11	.656
Hofstra †	12	–	6	.667	24	–	10	.706
Monmouth	11	–	7	.611	19	–	15	.559
Drexel	10	–	8	.556	17	–	16	.515
William & Mary	10	–	8	.556	20	–	12	.625
Towson	9	–	9	.500	19	–	15	.559
Stony Brook	9	–	9	.500	17	–	15	.531
Campbell	8	–	10	.444	16	–	18	.471
Hampton	7	–	11	.389	13	–	19	.406
Elon	6	–	12	.333	14	–	18	.438
North Carolina A&T	4	–	14	.222	11	–	19	.367
Northeastern	2	–	16	.111	7	–	24	.226
† 2026 CAA tournament winner As of March 10, 2026

The 2025–26 Monmouth Hawks men's basketball team represented Monmouth University during the 2025–26 NCAA Division I men's basketball season. The Hawks, led by 15th-year head coach King Rice, played their home games at OceanFirst Bank Center in West Long Branch, New Jersey as members of the Coastal Athletic Association.

== Previous season ==
The Hawks finished the 2024–25 season 13–20, 10–8 in CAA play, to finish in a tie for fifth place. They defeated Hofstra in the second round of the CAA tournament, before falling to Charleston in the quarterfinals.

== Preseason ==
On October 2, 2025, the CAA released their preseason coaches poll. Monmouth was picked to finish fifth in the conference.

=== Preseason rankings ===
CAA Preseason Poll
Place	Team	Points
1	Towson	136 (7)
2	UNC Wilmington	132 (5)
3	Charleston	130 (1)
4	William & Mary	93
5	Hampton	80
6	Monmouth	76
7	Campbell	75
T-8	Hofstra	66
T-8	Northeastern	66
10	Drexel	63
11	Stony Brook	41
12	Elon	35
13	North Carolina A&T	17
(#) first-place votes

=== Preseason All-CAA Teams ===
Preseason All-CAA Second Team
Player	Year	Position
Jack Collins	Senior	Guard

== Roster ==
2025–26 Monmouth Hawks men's basketball team
Players
Coaches

Pos.	#	Name	Height	Weight	Year	Previous school	Hometown
C	0	Dok Muordar	7 ft 1 in (2.16 m)	195 lb (88 kg)	Sr	Cleveland State	Rumbek, South Sudan
G	1	Jason Rivera-Torres	6 ft 7 in (2.01 m)	195 lb (88 kg)	Jr	San Francisco	Bronx, New York
G	2	Kavion McClain	5 ft 10 in (1.78 m)	165 lb (75 kg)	Sr	Texas Southern	Memphis, Tennessee
G	3	Anthony Martinez	6 ft 2 in (1.88 m)	175 lb (79 kg)	Fr	Lycée Léonard Limosin	Le Bouscat, France
G	4	Andrew Ball	6 ft 9 in (2.06 m)	215 lb (98 kg)	RS Jr	Shawnee High School	Marlton, New Jersey
G	5	Corey Miller	6 ft 2 in (1.88 m)	180 lb (82 kg)	Jr	The Pennington School	Ocean Township, New Jersey
G	7	Justin Ray	6 ft 3 in (1.91 m)	175 lb (79 kg)	So	Eastside High School	Greer, South Carolina
F	8	O'Marion Harvey	6 ft 7 in (2.01 m)	190 lb (86 kg)	Fr	St. Francis Episcopal School	Katy, Texas
G	9	Lucas Orchard	6 ft 3 in (1.91 m)	195 lb (88 kg)	So	Perkiomen School	Wayne, Pennsylvania
G	10	Jack Leahy	6 ft 5 in (1.96 m)	205 lb (93 kg)	Jr	Wyoming Seminary	Long Branch, New Jersey
G	13	Jack Collins	6 ft 5 in (1.96 m)	205 lb (93 kg)	Sr	The Phelps School	Manasquan, New Jersey
F	15	Stefanos Spartalis	6 ft 9 in (2.06 m)	220 lb (100 kg)	Fr	Olympiacos B.C.	Chios, Greece
G	20	Zubayr Griffin	6 ft 4 in (1.93 m)	180 lb (82 kg)	Fr	Binghamton High School	Binghamton, New York
F	23	Cornelius Robinson III	6 ft 7 in (2.01 m)	225 lb (102 kg)	Jr	Camden High School	Willingboro, New Jersey
G	24	Jinup Dobuol	6 ft 8 in (2.03 m)	205 lb (93 kg)	So	Portland	St. Cloud, Minnesota
F	42	Quinn Peters	6 ft 6 in (1.98 m)	205 lb (93 kg)	Jr	Manasquan High School	Spring Lake Heights, New Jersey

Head coach

- King Rice (North Carolina)

Assistant coach(es)

- Rick Callahan (Salem)
- Brian Reese (North Carolina)
- Clive Bentick (Canisius)
- Micah Seaborn (Monmouth)
- Justin Dempsey (Monmouth)

Legend

- (C) Team captain
- (S) Suspended
- (I) Ineligible
- (W) Walk-on
- Injured
- Current redshirt

Roster
Last update: October 15, 2025

== Schedule and results ==
Date time, TV	Rank^{#}	Opponent^{#}	Result	Record	Site (attendance) city, state
Exhibition
October 20, 2025*; 7:00 pm		Rhode Island College	W 103–67		OceanFirst Bank Center (243); West Long Branch, NJ
October 25, 2025*; 2:00 pm		Manhattan	W 81–62		OceanFirst Bank Center (551); West Long Branch, NJ
Non-conference regular season
November 4, 2025*; 7:00 pm, FloCollege/SNY		Caldwell	W 96–68	1–0	OceanFirst Bank Center (1,274); West Long Branch, NJ
November 8, 2025*; 3:30 pm, ESPN+		at La Salle	L 60–73	1–1	John Glaser Arena (2,942); Philadelphia, PA
November 13, 2025*; 7:00 pm, ESPN+		at Seton Hall	L 58–70	1–2	Prudential Center (6,179); Newark, NJ
November 18, 2025*; 9:00 pm, ACCNX		at Syracuse	L 73–78	1–3	JMA Wireless Dome (18,515); Syracuse, NY
November 23, 2025*; 2:00 pm, FloCollege		Robert Morris	W 71–70 ^{OT}	2–3	OceanFirst Bank Center (1,583); West Long Branch, NJ
November 28, 2025*; 2:00 pm, ESPN+		vs. Ball State; Lafayette Classic	W 80–73	3–3	Kirby Sports Center (574); Easton, PA
November 29, 2025*; 2:00 pm, ESPN+		vs. Le Moyne; Lafayette Classic	L 79–83	3–4	Kirby Sports Center (506); Easton, PA
November 30, 2025*; 4:30 pm, ESPN+		at Lafayette; Lafayette Classic	W 88–74	4–4	Kirby Sports Center (477); Easton, PA
December 3, 2025*; 8:00 pm, FloCollege/NBCSP		Princeton	W 63–58	5–4	OceanFirst Bank Center (1,517); West Long Branch, NJ
December 6, 2025*; 12:00 pm, ACCNX		at Georgia Tech	L 67–79	5–5	McCamish Pavilion (4,595); Atlanta, GA
December 14, 2025*; 2:00 pm, ESPN+		at Fairfield	L 65–73	5–6	Leo D. Mahoney Arena (1,474); Fairfield, CT
December 17, 2025*; 7:00 pm, FloCollege/NBCSP		Quinnipiac	L 75–85	5–7	OceanFirst Bank Center (1,179); West Long Branch, NJ
December 21, 2025*; 1:00 pm, FloCollege/NBCSP/SNY		Lehigh	W 76–62	6–7	OceanFirst Bank Center (1,527); West Long Branch, NJ
CAA regular season
December 31, 2025; 2:00 pm, FloCollege		Campbell	L 65–68	6–8 (0–1)	OceanFirst Bank Center (2,015); West Long Branch, NJ
January 3, 2025; 7:00 pm, FloCollege		at Towson	W 62–48	7–8 (1–1)	TU Arena (2,524); Towson, MD
January 8, 2026; 7:00 pm, FloCollege		William & Mary	W 81–70	8–8 (2–1)	OceanFirst Bank Center (1,124); West Long Branch, NJ
January 10, 2026; 2:00 pm, FloCollege		at Hofstra	L 64–67 ^{OT}	8–9 (2–2)	Mack Sports Complex (1,796); Hempstead, NY
January 15, 2026; 7:00 pm, FloCollege		Drexel	L 51–73	8–10 (2–3)	OceanFirst Bank Center (1,196); West Long Branch, NJ
January 17, 2026; 2:00 pm, FloCollege		Northeastern	W 81–68	9–10 (3–3)	OceanFirst Bank Center (2,313); West Long Branch, NJ
January 22, 2026; 7:00 pm, FloCollege		at Hampton	L 63–65	9–11 (3–4)	Hampton Convocation Center (1,273); Hampton, VA
January 24, 2026; 4:00 pm, FoCollege		at Campbell	W 88–73	10–11 (4–4)	Gore Arena (1,415); Buies Creek, NC
January 29, 2026; 7:00 pm, FloCollege		North Carolina A&T	W 83–81 ^{OT}	11–11 (5–4)	OceanFirst Bank Center (1,419); West Long Branch, NJ
January 31, 2026; 2:00 pm, FloCollege; SNY		Hofstra	L 57–73	11–12 (5–5)	OceanFirst Bank Center (2,572); West Long Branch, NJ
February 5, 2026; 7:00 pm, FloCollege; SNY		at Stony Brook	W 76–75	12–12 (6–5)	Stony Brook Arena (1,768); Stony Brook, NY
February 12, 2026; 7:00 pm, FloCollege		at Drexel	W 93–73	13–12 (7–5)	Daskalakis Athletic Center (1,363); Philadelphia, PA
February 14, 2026; 2:00 pm, FloCollege/CBSSN		Towson	W 72–71	14–12 (8–5)	OceanFirst Bank Center (1,929); West Long Branch, NJ
February 19, 2026; 7:00 pm, FloCollege		at UNC Wilmington	L 69–79	14–13 (8–6)	Trask Coliseum (5,220); Wilmington, NC
February 21, 2026; 3:00pm, SNY		at Charleston	L 63–74	14–14 (8–7)	TD Arena (5,048); Charleston, SC
February 26, 2026; 7:00 pm, FloCollege		Stony Brook	W 82–69	15–14 (9–7)	OceanFirst Bank Center (1,637); West Long Branch, NJ
February 28, 2026; 3:00 pm, FloCollege		Elon	W 73–57	16–14 (10–7)	OceanFirst Bank Center (2,959); West Long Branch, NJ
March 3, 2026; 7:00 pm, FloCollege		at Northeastern	W 89–83	17–14 (11–7)	Cabot Center (513); Boston, MA
CAA tournament
March 8, 2026; 2:30 pm, FloCollege	(4)	vs. (5) Drexel; Quarterfinal	W 65–57	18–14	CareFirst Arena (1,666); Washington, D.C.
March 9, 2026; 6:00 pm, CBSSN	(4)	vs. (9) Campbell; Semifinal	W 74–64	19–14	CareFirst Arena (1,567); Washington, D.C.
March 10, 2026; 7:00 pm, CBSSN	(4)	vs. (3) Hofstra; Championship	L 69–75	19–15	CareFirst Arena (1,359); Washington, D.C.
*Non-conference game. ^{#}Rankings from AP Poll. (#) Tournament seedings in parentheses. All times are in Eastern.
