= 2025–26 Elon Phoenix men's basketball team =

American college basketball season

2025–26 Elon Phoenix men's basketball
- Conference: Coastal Athletic Association
- Record: 14–18 (6–12 CAA)
- Head coach: Billy Taylor (4th season)
- Assistant coaches: Courtney Eldridge; Sean Halloran; Ryan Saunders; Al Seibert; Darius Stokes
- Home arena: Schar Center

2025–26 CAA men's basketball standings
	Conf.				Overall
Team	W		L	PCT	W		L	PCT
UNC Wilmington	15	–	3	.833	26	–	5	.839
Charleston	14	–	4	.778	21	–	10	.677
Hofstra	12	–	6	.667	21	–	10	.677
Monmouth	11	–	7	.611	17	–	14	.548
Drexel	10	–	8	.556	17	–	15	.531
William & Mary	10	–	8	.556	20	–	11	.645
Towson	9	–	9	.500	18	–	14	.563
Stony Brook	9	–	9	.500	17	–	15	.531
Campbell	8	–	10	.444	15	–	17	.469
Hampton	7	–	11	.389	13	–	19	.406
Elon	6	–	12	.333	14	–	18	.438
North Carolina A&T	4	–	14	.222	11	–	19	.367
Northeastern	2	–	16	.111	7	–	24	.226
† 2026 CAA tournament winner As of March 7, 2026

The 2025–26 Elon Phoenix men's basketball team represented Elon University during the 2025–26 NCAA Division I men's basketball season. The Phoenix, led by fourth-year head coach Billy Taylor, played their home games at the Schar Center in Elon, North Carolina as members of the Coastal Athletic Association.

== Previous season ==
The Phoenix finished the 2024–25 season 17–16, 8–10 in CAA play, to finish in a tie for ninth place. They were defeated by Drexel in the second round of the CAA tournament. They received an invitation to the CBI, where they would be defeated by Army in the first round.

== Preseason ==
On October 2, 2025, the CAA released their preseason coaches poll. Elon was picked to finish 12th in the conference.

=== Preseason rankings ===
CAA Preseason Poll
Place	Team	Points
1	Towson	136 (7)
2	UNC Wilmington	132 (5)
3	Charleston	130 (1)
4	William & Mary	93
5	Hampton	80
6	Monmouth	76
7	Campbell	75
T-8	Hofstra	66
T-8	Northeastern	66
10	Drexel	63
11	Stony Brook	41
12	Elon	35
13	North Carolina A&T	17
(#) first-place votes

=== Preseason All-CAA Teams ===
No players were named to the All-CAA First or Second Teams.

== Roster ==
2025–26 Elon Phoenix men's basketball team
Players
Coaches

Pos.	#	Name	Height	Weight	Year	Previous school	Hometown
G	0	Bryson Cokley	6 ft 6 in (1.98 m)	196 lb (89 kg)	So	George Mason	Whiteville, North Carolina
G	1	Trey O'Neil	6 ft 1 in (1.85 m)	185 lb (84 kg)	So	IMG Academy	Ardmore, Pennsylvania
G	2	Ja'Juan Carr	6 ft 2 in (1.88 m)	195 lb (88 kg)	GS	UNC Pembroke	Burgaw, North Carolina
F	4	Iker Garmendia	6 ft 9 in (2.06 m)	220 lb (100 kg)	RS Fr	UIC	Barcelona, Spain
C	5	Caleb Middleton	6 ft 11 in (2.11 m)	230 lb (104 kg)	So	New Hampshire	Dover, New Hampshire
F	6	Kacper Klaczek	6 ft 8 in (2.03 m)	225 lb (102 kg)	GS	Albany	Chorzów, Poland
F	7	Chandler Cuthrell	6 ft 8 in (2.03 m)	225 lb (102 kg)	GS	Purdue Fort Wayne	Baltimore, Maryland
G	8	DeMarco Johnson	6 ft 4 in (1.93 m)	176 lb (80 kg)	Fr	Oak Hill Academy	Long Beach, California
G	10	Austin Williams	6 ft 1 in (1.85 m)	185 lb (84 kg)	Sr	Glenelg Country School	Laurel, Maryland
G	11	Randall Pettus II	6 ft 3 in (1.91 m)	197 lb (89 kg)	Jr	Northern Kentucky	Bessemer City, North Carolina
F	12	Isaac Harrell	6 ft 8 in (2.03 m)	218 lb (99 kg)	Jr	Jonesboro High School	Jonesboro, Arkansas
G	13	Savion Taylor	6 ft 4 in (1.93 m)	200 lb (91 kg)	RS Fr	The Burlington School	Burlington, North Carolina
G	14	Alex Brabec	6 ft 2 in (1.88 m)	185 lb (84 kg)	Fr	Skyline High School	Ann Arbor, Michigan
G	22	Ned Hull	6 ft 3 in (1.91 m)	195 lb (88 kg)	RS So	Charlotte Latin School	Charlotte, North Carolina
F	25	Alex Olander	6 ft 4 in (1.93 m)	235 lb (107 kg)	So	Millbrook High School	Raleigh, North Carolina
F	33	Bryson Spell	6 ft 9 in (2.06 m)	230 lb (104 kg)	GS	Liberty	Virginia Beach, Virginia

Head coach

- Billy Taylor (Notre Dame)

Assistant coach(es)

- Courtney Eldridge (UNC Greensboro)
- Sean Halloran (Elon)
- Ryan Saunders (Barry)
- Al Seibert (Fredonia State)
- Darius Stokes (Iowa)

Legend

- (C) Team captain
- (S) Suspended
- (I) Ineligible
- (W) Walk-on
- Injured
- Current redshirt

Roster
Last update: October 14, 2025

== Schedule and results ==
Date time, TV	Rank^{#}	Opponent^{#}	Result	Record	Site (attendance) city, state
Non-conference regular season
November 5, 2025*; 7:00 pm, FloCollege		Belmont Abbey	W 99–51	1–0	Schar Center (1,344); Elon, NC
November 8, 2025*; 4:00 pm, ESPN+		at UNC Greensboro	W 92–90 ^{OT}	2–0	Bodford Arena (1,718); Greensboro, NC
November 12, 2025*; 7:00 pm, ESPN+		at Marshall	L 89–96	2–1	Cam Henderson Center (3,797); Huntington, WV
November 15, 2025*; 8:00 pm, FloCollege		Gardner–Webb	W 95–84	3–1	Schar Center (1,467); Elon, NC
November 20, 2025*; 7:00 pm, ACCNX		at Miami (FL)	L 72–99	3–2	Watsco Center (4,131); Coral Gables, FL
November 24, 2025*; 6:30 pm, ESPN+		at Appalachian State	W 88–53	4–2	Holmes Center (2,021); Boone, NC
November 29, 2025*; 4:00 pm, FloCollege		Mercer	L 84–91	4–3	Schar Center (1,026); Elon, NC
December 3, 2025*; 7:00 pm, FloCollege		Furman	L 88–97	4–4	Schar Center (1,468); Elon, NC
December 6, 2025*; 4:00 pm, ESPN+		at Wofford	W 73–52	5–4	Jerry Richardson Indoor Stadium (1,165); Spartanburg, SC
December 13, 2025*; 1:00 pm, FloCollege		Northern Illinois	W 85–79	6–4	Schar Center (1,092); Elon, NC
December 17, 2025*; 7:00 pm, FloCollege		Richmond	W 73–70	7–4	Schar Center (1,228); Elon, NC
December 20, 2025*; 2:00 pm, ACCNX		at Virginia Tech	L 81–82 ^{OT}	7–5	Cassell Coliseum (4,380); Blacksburg, VA
December 22, 2025*; 4:00 pm, FloCollege		Greensboro	W 97–63	8–5	Schar Center (1,057); Elon, NC
CAA regular season
December 29, 2025; 7:00 pm, FloCollege		Northeastern	W 103–91	9–5 (1–0)	Schar Center (1,231); Elon, NC
December 31, 2025; 2:00 pm, FloCollege		Charleston	L 81–85	9–6 (1–1)	Schar Center; Elon, NC
January 8, 2026; 7:00 pm, FloCollege		at North Carolina A&T	W 69–64	10–6 (2–1)	Corbett Sports Center (908); Greensboro, NC
January 10, 2026; 7:00 pm, FloCollege		Campbell	W 83–82	11–6 (3–1)	Schar Center (1,743); Elon, NC
January 15, 2026; 7:00 pm, FloCollege		at Northeastern	L 78–85	11–7 (3–2)	Cabot Center (811); Boston, MA
January 17, 2026; 12:00 pm, CBSSN		at Hofstra	W 89–85	12–7 (4–2)	Mack Sports Complex (1,721); Hempstead, NY
January 22, 2026; 7:00 pm, FloCollege		Towson	L 59–72	12–8 (4–3)	Schar Center (1,509); Elon, NC
January 24, 2026; 4:00 pm, FloCollege		at Charleston	L 70–80	12–9 (4–4)	TD Arena (4,961); Charleston, SC
January 29, 2026; 7:00 pm, FloCollege		William & Mary	W 79–76	13–9 (5–4)	Schar Center (1,815); Elon, NC
January 31, 2026; 7:00 pm, FloCollege		Stony Brook	L 68–72	13–10 (5–5)	Schar Center (1,161); Elon, NC
February 5, 2026; 7:00 pm, FloCollege		at Hampton	L 79–87 ^{2OT}	13–11 (5–6)	Hampton Convocation Center (977); Hampton, VA
February 7, 2026; 7:00 pm, CBSSN		Drexel	L 77–82	13–12 (5–7)	Schar Center (2,021); Elon, NC
February 12, 2026; 7:00 pm, FloCollege		at UNC Wilmington	L 54–65	13–13 (5-8)	Trask Coliseum (5,220); Wilmington, NC
February 14, 2026; 2:00 pm, FloCollege		at William & Mary	W 81–78	14–13 (6–8)	Kaplan Arena (5,074); Williamsburg, VA
February 21, 2026; 7:00 pm, FloCollege		North Carolina A&T	L 82–102	14–14 (6–9)	Schar Center (2,312); Elon, NC
February 26, 2026; 7:00 pm, FloCollege		at Towson	L 56–58	14–15 (6–10)	TU Arena (2,599); Towson, MD
February 28, 2026; 3:00 pm, FloCollege		at Monmouth	L 57–73	14–16 (6–11)	OceanFirst Bank Center (2,959); West Long Branch, NJ
March 3, 2026; 7:00 pm, FloCollege		UNC Wilmington	L 57–79	14–17 (6–12)	Schar Center (2,419); Elon, NC
CAA tournament
March 7, 2026; 8:30 pm, FloCollege	(11)	vs. (6) William & Mary; Second round	L 62–72	14–18	CareFirst Arena (1,817); Washington, D.C.
*Non-conference game. ^{#}Rankings from AP Poll. (#) Tournament seedings in parentheses. All times are in Eastern.
