= Ivan Thomas (basketball) =

American basketball player and coach (born 1975)

Current position
- Title: Head coach
- Team: Hampton
- Conference: CAA
- Record: 31–37 (.456)

Biographical details
- Born: January 1, 1975 (age 51); Norfolk, Virginia, U.S.
- Education: VCU ('97)

Coaching career (HC unless noted)
- 1997–2000: Schaumburg HS (assistant)
- 2002–2005: Edison HS
- 2006–2008: T.C. Williams HS
- 2009–2015: Kecoughtan HS
- 2016–2023: Providence (assistant)
- 2023–2024: Georgetown (Associate HC)
- 2024–present: Hampton

Administrative career (AD unless noted)
- 2015–2016: Providence (assoc. DPD)

Head coaching record
- Overall: 31–37 (.456) (college)

Ivan C. Thomas (born January 1, 1975) is an American college basketball coach who is the current head coach of the Hampton Pirates men's basketball team.

== Coaching career ==
Thomas got his first coaching job in 1997 as an assistant coach for Schaumburg High School where he helped lead them to a state title in 2000. In 2002, Thomas got his first head coaching job at Edison High School. In 2005, Thomas was hired by T.C. Williams High School to be the school head coach where he led them to a state title in 2008 and was named the Virginia Coach of the Year in 2008. Then in 2008, Thomas joined Kecoughtan High School as the school's head coach. In 2015, Thomas got his first collegiate coaching job as the Associate Director of Player Development for the Providence Friars. In 2016, the Friars promoted Thomas to serve as an assistant coach. For the 2023 season, Thomas was hired by the Georgetown Hoyas to be the team's associate head coach. On March 13, 2024, Thomas was hired by the Hampton Pirates to be the team's next head coach.

== Head coaching record ==
Record table
Season	Team	Overall	Conference	Standing	Postseason
Hampton Pirates (Coastal Athletic Association) (2024–present)
2024–25	Hampton	17–16	8–10	T–9th	
2025–26	Hampton	13–19	7–11	10th	
2026–27	Hampton	1–2	0–0		
Hampton:		31–37 (.456)	15–21 (.417)		
Total:		31–37 (.456)			
National champion Postseason invitational champion Conference regular season champion Conference regular season and conference tournament champion Division regular season champion Division regular season and conference tournament champion Conference tournament champion
