= 2025–26 North Carolina A&T Aggies men's basketball team =

American college basketball season

2025–26 North Carolina A&T Aggies men's basketball
- Conference: Coastal Athletic Association
- Record: 11–19 (4–14 CAA)
- Head coach: Monté Ross (3rd season)
- Associate head coach: Ricky Moore
- Assistant coaches: Dorian Long; Colin Daly
- Home arena: Corbett Sports Center

2025–26 CAA men's basketball standings
	Conf.				Overall
Team	W		L	PCT	W		L	PCT
UNC Wilmington	15	–	3	.833	27	–	7	.794
Charleston	14	–	4	.778	21	–	11	.656
Hofstra †	12	–	6	.667	24	–	11	.686
Monmouth	11	–	7	.611	19	–	15	.559
Drexel	10	–	8	.556	17	–	16	.515
William & Mary	10	–	8	.556	20	–	12	.625
Towson	9	–	9	.500	19	–	15	.559
Stony Brook	9	–	9	.500	17	–	15	.531
Campbell	8	–	10	.444	16	–	18	.471
Hampton	7	–	11	.389	13	–	19	.406
Elon	6	–	12	.333	14	–	18	.438
North Carolina A&T	4	–	14	.222	11	–	19	.367
Northeastern	2	–	16	.111	7	–	24	.226
† 2026 CAA tournament winner

The 2025–26 North Carolina A&T Aggies men's basketball team represented North Carolina A&T State University during the 2025–26 NCAA Division I men's basketball season. The Aggies, led by third-year head coach Monté Ross, played their home games at the Corbett Sports Center in Greensboro, North Carolina as members of the Coastal Athletic Association.

== Previous season ==
The Aggies finished the 2024–25 season 7–25, 3–15 in CAA play, to finish in last place. They were defeated by Hofstra in the first round of the CAA tournament.

== Preseason ==
On October 2, 2025, the CAA released their preseason coaches poll. North Carolina A&T was picked to finish last in the conference.

=== Preseason rankings ===
CAA Preseason Poll
Place	Team	Points
1	Towson	136 (7)
2	UNC Wilmington	132 (5)
3	Charleston	130 (1)
4	William & Mary	93
5	Hampton	80
6	Monmouth	76
7	Campbell	75
T-8	Hofstra	66
T-8	Northeastern	66
10	Drexel	63
11	Stony Brook	41
12	Elon	35
13	North Carolina A&T	17
(#) first-place votes

=== Preseason All-CAA Teams ===
No players were named to the All-CAA First or Second Teams.

== Roster ==
2025–26 North Carolina A&T Aggies men's basketball team
Players
Coaches

Pos.	#	Name	Height	Weight	Year	Previous school	Hometown
G	0	Lureon Walker	6 ft 5 in (1.96 m)	190 lb (86 kg)	RS Jr	Mount Olive	Durham, North Carolina
G	1	Trent Middleton Jr.	6 ft 3 in (1.91 m)	—	Jr	Delaware	Philadelphia, Pennsylvania
G	2	Mujahiid Burton	6 ft 5 in (1.96 m)	180 lb (82 kg)	Jr	Wabash Valley College	Minneapolis, Minnesota
G	4	Bryson Ogletree	6 ft 4 in (1.93 m)	190 lb (86 kg)	Jr	South Plains College	Hampton, Georgia
F	5	Lewis Walker	6 ft 6 in (1.98 m)	230 lb (104 kg)	RS Fr	UMass	Winston-Salem, North Carolina
G	7	Brooklyn Vick	6 ft 2 in (1.88 m)	150 lb (68 kg)	RS Fr	Hargrave Military Academy	Deerfield Beach, Florida
F	8	Zamoku Weluche-Ume	6 ft 8 in (2.03 m)	220 lb (100 kg)	Jr	George Washington	London, England
G	9	Yancarlos Cueto	6 ft 5 in (1.96 m)	180 lb (82 kg)	Fr	St. George's School	Providence, Rhode Island
G	10	Uchenna Kellman-Nicholes	6 ft 5 in (1.96 m)	180 lb (82 kg)	Jr	Seminole High School	Orlando, Florida
G	11	Dwayne Pierce	6 ft 5 in (1.96 m)	215 lb (98 kg)	So	Iowa State	New York, New York
F	14	Amadou Doumbia	6 ft 11 in (2.11 m)	215 lb (98 kg)	So	UMass	Bamako, Mali
G	15	Jalal McKie	6 ft 4 in (1.93 m)	195 lb (88 kg)	Jr	Westlake High School	Atlanta, Georgia
G	20	Chanler Montgomery	6 ft 3 in (1.91 m)	172 lb (78 kg)	So	Salem High School	Blacksburg, Virginia
C	31	Efstratios Kalliontzis	6 ft 11 in (2.11 m)	225 lb (102 kg)	RS So	La Salle	Mitilini, Greece
F	32	KJ Debrick (5th)	6 ft 9 in (2.06 m)	240 lb (109 kg)	Sr	Cleveland State	Springfield, Illinois
C	34	Will Felton	6 ft 9 in (2.06 m)	260 lb (118 kg)	RS Jr	Arizona State	Raleigh, North Carolina

Head coach

- Monté Ross (Winston-Salem State)

Assistant coach(es)

- Ricky Moore (Connecticut)
- Dorian Long (Neumann)
- Colin Daly (Temple)

Legend

- (C) Team captain
- (S) Suspended
- (I) Ineligible
- (W) Walk-on
- (5th) Fifth-year senior
- Injured
- Current redshirt

Roster
Last update: October 16, 2025

== Schedule and results ==
Date time, TV	Rank^{#}	Opponent^{#}	Result	Record	Site (attendance) city, state
Exhibition
October 25, 2025*; 7:00 pm		High Point	L 60–88		Qubein Center; High Point, NC
Non-conference regular season
November 4, 2025*; 7:00 pm, SECN+		at South Carolina	L 72–91	0–1	Colonial Life Arena (12,344); Columbia, SC
November 10, 2025*; 7:00 pm, FloCollege		South Carolina State	W 85–62	1–1	Corbett Sports Center (3,923); Greensboro, NC
November 13, 2025*; 7:00 pm, FloCollege		Washington Adventist	W 89–83	2–1	Corbett Sports Center (1,907); Greensboro, NC
November 18, 2025*; 7:00 pm		at Morgan State	W 79–73	3–1	Hill Field House (2,496); Baltimore, MD
November 28, 2025*; 4:00 pm, ESPN+		at Davidson	L 74–90	3–2	John M. Belk Arena (2,795); Davidson, NC
December 3, 2025*; 7:00 pm, ESPN+		at Charlotte	L 57–74	3–3	Dale F. Halton Arena (2,822); Charlotte, NC
December 6, 2025*; 4:30 pm, ESPN+		at North Carolina Central; Rivalry	W 69–54	4–3	McDougald–McLendon Arena (2,631); Durham, NC
December 9, 2025*; 7:00 pm		vs. Howard	L 69–73	4–4	Cameron Indoor Stadium (780); Durham, NC
December 12, 2025*; 7:00 pm, FloCollege		Maryland Eastern Shore	W 82–79	5–4	Corbett Sports Center (859); Greensboro, NC
December 16, 2025*; 7:00 pm, ESPN+		at UNC Greensboro; Battle of Market Street	W 71–65	6–4	First Horizon Coliseum (1,237); Greensboro, NC
December 20, 2025*; 12:00 pm, FloCollege		Mid-Atlantic Christian	W 95–55	7–4	Corbett Sports Center (926); Greensboro, NC
CAA regular season
December 29, 2025; 7:00 pm, CBSSN		UNC Wilmington	L 78–87	7–5 (0–1)	Corbett Sports Center (1,429); Greensboro, NC
December 31, 2025; 3:00 pm, FloCollege		Northeastern	L 74–85	7–6 (0–2)	Corbett Sports Center (804); Greensboro, NC
January 3, 2026; 4:00 pm, FloCollege		at Stony Brook	L 80–81	7–7 (0–3)	Stony Brook Arena (1,740); Stony Brook, NY
January 8, 2026; 7:00 pm, FloCollege		Elon	L 64–69	7–8 (0–4)	Corbett Sports Center (908); Greensboro, NC
January 15, 2026; 7:00 pm, FloCollege		at William & Mary	L 89–97	7–9 (0–5)	Kaplan Arena (3,241); Williamsburg, VA
January 19, 2026; 9:00 pm, CBSSN		at Hampton	L 61–82	7–10 (0–6)	Hampton Convocation Center (4,776); Hampton, VA
January 22, 2026; 7:00 pm, FloCollege		Hofstra	W 79–78	8–10 (1–6)	Corbett Sports Center (5,405); Greensboro, NC
January 24, 2026; 2:00 pm, FloCollege		Towson	W 80–73	9–10 (2–6)	Corbett Sports Center (526); Greensboro, NC
January 29, 2026; 7:00 pm, FloCollege		at Monmouth	L 81–83 ^{OT}	9–11 (2–7)	OceanFirst Bank Center (1,419); West Long Branch, NJ
January 31, 2026; 2:00 pm, FloCollege		at Drexel	L 60–61	9–12 (2–8)	Daskalakis Athletic Center (1,277); Philadelphia, PA
February 5, 2026; 7:00 pm, FloCollege		at Charleston	L 62–78	9–13 (2–9)	TD Arena (4,859); Charleston, SC
February 7, 2026; 2:00 pm, FloCollege		Campbell	L 71–79	9–14 (2–10)	Corbett Sports Center (1,411); Greensboro, NC
February 13, 2026; 11:00 pm, ESPN2		vs. Hampton; NBA HBCU Classic	W 71–70	10–14 (3–10)	Kia Forum; Inglewood, CA
February 19, 2026; 7:00 pm, FloCollege		Charleston	L 61–74	10–15 (3–11)	Corbett Sports Center (3,892); Greensboro, NC
February 21, 2026; 7:00 pm, FloCollege		at Elon	W 102–82	11–15 (4–11)	Schar Center (2,312); Elon, NC
February 26, 2026; 7:00 pm, FloCollege		at UNC Wilmington	L 65–88	11–16 (4–12)	Trask Coliseum (5,220); Wilmington, NC
February 28, 2026; 2:00 pm, FloCollege		William & Mary	L 88–91	11–17 (4–13)	Corbett Sports Center (1,109); Greensboro, NC
March 3, 2026; 7:00 pm, FloCollege		at Campbell	L 72–90	11–18 (4–14)	Gore Arena (1,327); Buies Creek, NC
CAA tournament
March 6, 2026; 2:00 pm, FloCollege	(12)	vs. (13) Northeastern; First Round	L 72–88	11–19	CareFirst Arena; Washington, D.C.
*Non-conference game. ^{#}Rankings from AP Poll. (#) Tournament seedings in parentheses. All times are in Eastern.
