= 2025–26 Hampton Pirates basketball team =

American college basketball season

2025–26 Hampton Pirates basketball
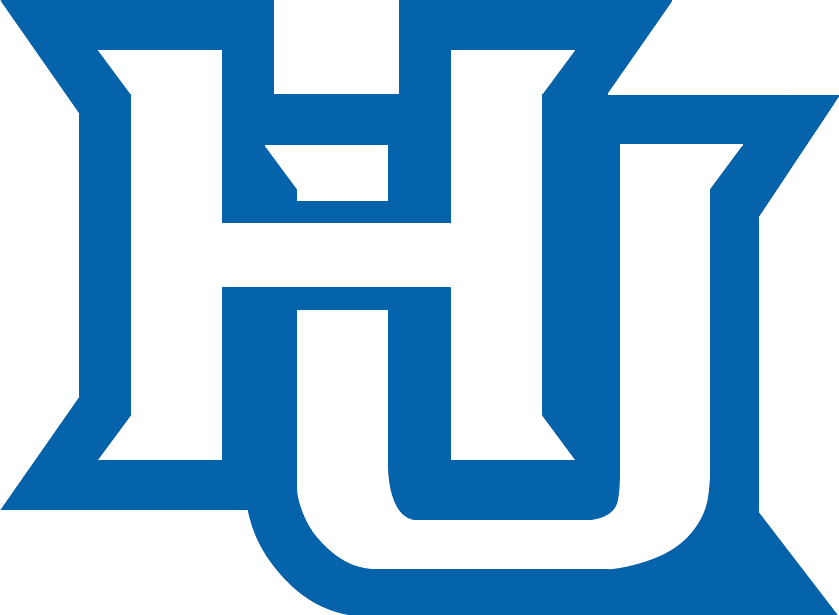
- Conference: Coastal Athletic Association
- Record: 13–19 (7–11 CAA)
- Head coach: Ivan Thomas (2nd season)
- Associate head coach: Greg Fahey
- Assistant coaches: Calvin Cage; Mike Carr; Kyron Cartwright
- Home arena: Hampton Convocation Center

2025–26 CAA men's basketball standings
	Conf.				Overall
Team	W		L	PCT	W		L	PCT
UNC Wilmington	15	–	3	.833	27	–	7	.794
Charleston	14	–	4	.778	21	–	11	.656
Hofstra †	12	–	6	.667	24	–	11	.686
Monmouth	11	–	7	.611	19	–	15	.559
Drexel	10	–	8	.556	17	–	16	.515
William & Mary	10	–	8	.556	20	–	12	.625
Towson	9	–	9	.500	19	–	15	.559
Stony Brook	9	–	9	.500	17	–	15	.531
Campbell	8	–	10	.444	16	–	18	.471
Hampton	7	–	11	.389	13	–	19	.406
Elon	6	–	12	.333	14	–	18	.438
North Carolina A&T	4	–	14	.222	11	–	19	.367
Northeastern	2	–	16	.111	7	–	24	.226
† 2026 CAA tournament winner

The 2025–26 Hampton Pirates basketball team represented Hampton University during the 2025–26 NCAA Division I men's basketball season. The Pirates, led by second-year head coach Ivan Thomas, played their home games at the Hampton Convocation Center in Hampton, Virginia as members of the Coastal Athletic Association.

== Previous season ==
The Pirates finished the 2024–25 season 17–16, 8–10 in CAA play, to finish in a tie for ninth place. They defeated Northeastern in the second round of the CAA tournament, before falling to eventual tournament champions UNC Wilmington in the quarterfinals.

== Preseason ==
On October 2, 2025, the CAA released their preseason coaches poll. Hampton was picked to finish fifth in the conference.

=== Preseason rankings ===
CAA Preseason Poll
Place	Team	Points
1	Towson	136 (7)
2	UNC Wilmington	132 (5)
3	Charleston	130 (1)
4	William & Mary	93
5	Hampton	80
6	Monmouth	76
7	Campbell	75
T-8	Hofstra	66
T-8	Northeastern	66
10	Drexel	63
11	Stony Brook	41
12	Elon	35
13	North Carolina A&T	17
(#) first-place votes

=== Preseason All-CAA Teams ===
Preseason All-CAA Honorable Mention
Player	Year	Position
Daniel Johnson	Sophomore	Guard
Xzavier Long	Senior	Forward

== Roster ==
2025–26 Hampton Pirates men's basketball team
Players
Coaches

Pos.	#	Name	Height	Weight	Year	Previous school	Hometown
G	0	Kody Williams	6 ft 0 in (1.83 m)	190 lb (86 kg)	Sr	Hawaiʻi	Minnetonka, Minnesota
G/F	1	Christian Watson	6 ft 6 in (1.98 m)	205 lb (93 kg)	Sr	Southern Miss	Lanham, Maryland
G	2	Jalyke Gaines-Wyatt	6 ft 0 in (1.83 m)	186 lb (84 kg)	Jr	Alcorn State	Wyandanch, New York
G	3	Michael Eley	6 ft 4 in (1.93 m)	180 lb (82 kg)	Sr	Tulane	Fort Wayne, Indiana
G	5	Etienne Strothers	6 ft 2 in (1.88 m)	210 lb (95 kg)	RS So	Appalachian State	Newport News, Virginia
G	8	Elijah Kennedy	6 ft 4 in (1.93 m)	180 lb (82 kg)	Sr	Texas State	Virginia Beach, Virginia
G	11	Daniel Johnson	6 ft 7 in (2.01 m)	190 lb (86 kg)	So	Brewster Academy	Chicago, Illinois
F	12	Peter Oduro	6 ft 8 in (2.03 m)	230 lb (104 kg)	Sr	Coppin State	Gainesville, Virginia
F	13	Aidan Haskins	6 ft 8 in (2.03 m)	210 lb (95 kg)	Fr	Friendship Tech Prep	Washington, D.C.
F	15	Eunique Rink	6 ft 10 in (2.08 m)	220 lb (100 kg)	So	College Achieve Asbury Park	Newark, New Jersey
G/F	21	John-Howard Wesley	6 ft 6 in (1.98 m)	190 lb (86 kg)	Jr	Ole Miss	Alexandria, Virginia
G	22	Kellan Lewis	6 ft 0 in (1.83 m)	165 lb (75 kg)	RS Fr	Lake Highland Prep	Orlando, Florida
F	23	Josh Ogundele	7 ft 0 in (2.13 m)	275 lb (125 kg)	GS	Tennessee State	London, England
G	24	Quintin Cooper	6 ft 2 in (1.88 m)	180 lb (82 kg)	Fr	Coolidge High School	Washington, D.C.
F	25	Xzavier Long	6 ft 7 in (2.01 m)	190 lb (86 kg)	Sr	Canisius	Washington, D.C.
G	30	Hamza Asadallah	6 ft 1 in (1.85 m)	—	RS Fr	American School	Kuwait City, Kuwait

Head coach

- Ivan Thomas (VCU)

Assistant coach(es)

- Greg Fahey (Marist)
- Calvin Cage (Buffalo)
- Mike Carr (Indiana)
- Kyron Cartwright (Providence)

Legend

- (C) Team captain
- (S) Suspended
- (I) Ineligible
- (W) Walk-on
- Injured
- Current redshirt

Roster
Last update: October 14, 2025

== Schedule and results ==
Date time, TV	Rank^{#}	Opponent^{#}	Result	Record	Site (attendance) city, state
Exhibition
October 26, 2025*; 2:00 pm		at Old Dominion	W 82–79		Chartway Arena; Norfolk, VA
Non-conference regular season
November 3, 2025*; 8:00 pm, ESPN+		at Milwaukee	L 86–90	0–1	UWM Panther Arena (1,744); Milwaukee, WI
November 6, 2025*; 7:00 pm, FloCollege/MASN		Mid-Atlantic Christian	W 103–43	1–1	Hampton Convocation Center (1,251); Hampton, VA
November 11, 2025*; 9:00 pm, ACCNX		at Virginia	L 53–91	1–2	John Paul Jones Arena (11,393); Charlottesville, VA
November 14, 2025*; 8:15 pm, ESPN+		at Brown; College Hill Classic	W 72–63	2–2	Pizzitola Sports Center (407); Providence, RI
November 16, 2025*; 1:00 pm		vs. Holy Cross; College Hill Classic	L 61–67	2–3	Pizzitola Sports Center (225); Providence, RI
November 18, 2025*; 7:00 pm, ACCNX		at Boston College	L 52–63	2–4	Conte Forum (3,751); Chestnut Hill, MA
November 21, 2025*; 8:00 pm		at Norfolk State; Battle of the Bay	L 60–62	2–5	Echols Hall (3,912); Norfolk, VA
November 25, 2025*; 7:00 pm		at Maryland Eastern Shore	W 74–68	3–5	Hytche Athletic Center (2,112); Princess Anne, MD
December 1, 2025*; 7:00 pm, FloCollege/MASN		The Apprentice School	W 94–58	4–5	Hampton Convocation Center (867); Hampton, VA
December 3, 2025*; 7:00 pm, FloCollege/MASN		Loyola (MD)	W 93–71	5–5	Hampton Convocation Center (775); Hampton, VA
December 13, 2025*; 3:00 pm, ESPN+		vs. Howard; Battle of the Real HU	L 57–61	5–6	CareFirst Arena; Washington, D.C.
December 18, 2025*; 5:00 pm, ESPNU		vs. Jackson State; Chris Paul HBCU Classic	W 84–77	6–6	Gateway Center Arena (425); College Park, GA
December 19, 2025*; 5:00 pm, ESPNU		vs. Grambling State; Chris Paul HBCU Classic	L 72–81	6–7	Gateway Center Arena (486); College Park, GA
CAA regular season
December 29, 2025; 7:00 pm, FloCollege		Stony Brook	W 62–59	7–7 (1–0)	Hampton Convocation Center (579); Hampton, VA
December 31, 2025; 2:30 pm, FloCollege/MASN		Towson	W 63–62	8–7 (2–0)	Hampton Convocation Center (1,548); Hampton, VA
January 3, 2026; 7:00 pm, FloCollege		at UNC Wilmington	L 45–49	8–8 (2–1)	Trask Coliseum (5,220); Wilmington, NC
January 8, 2026; 7:00 pm, FloCollege		at Campbell	L 72–86	8–9 (2–2)	Gore Arena (1,298); Buies Creek, NC
January 10, 2026; 5:00 pm, FloCollege		at Charleston	L 70–74	8–10 (2–3)	TD Arena (4,875); Charleston, SC
January 19, 2026; 9:00 pm, CBSSN		North Carolina A&T	W 82–61	9–10 (3–3)	Hampton Convocation Center (4,776); Hampton, VA
January 22, 2026; 7:00 pm, CBSSN		Monmouth	W 65–63	10–10 (4–3)	Hampton Convocation Center (1,273); Hampton, VA
January 24, 2026; 12:00 pm, FloCollege/MASN		UNC Wilmington	L 67–75	10–11 (4–4)	Hampton Convocation Center (852); Hampton, VA
January 29, 2026; 7:00 pm, FloCollege		at Drexel	L 51–58	10–12 (4–5)	Daskalakis Athletic Center (917); Philadelphia, PA
January 31, 2026; 2:00 pm, FloCollege		at Towson	L 50–82	10–13 (4–6)	TU Arena (3,615); Towson, MD
February 5, 2026; 7:00 pm, FloCollege		Elon	W 87–79 ^{2OT}	11–13 (5–6)	Hampton Convocation Center (977); Hampton, VA
February 7, 2026; 2:30 pm, FloCollege/MASN		William & Mary	W 77–74	12–13 (6–6)	Hampton Convocation Center (1,293); Hampton, VA
February 13, 2026; 11:00 pm, ESPN2/NBA TV/Peacock/NBCSN		vs. North Carolina A&T; NBA HBCU Classic	L 70–71	12–14 (6–7)	Kia Forum; Inglewood, CA
February 19, 2026; 8:00 pm, CBSSN		at Hofstra	L 43–79	12–15 (6–8)	Mack Sports Complex (1,921); Hempstead, NY
February 21, 2026; 4:00 pm, FloCollege		at Stony Brook	L 72–79	12–16 (6–9)	Stony Brook Arena (2,433); Stony Brook, NY
February 26, 2026; 11:00 am, FloCollege/MASN		Charleston	L 71–85	12–17 (6–10)	Hampton Convocation Center (1,017); Hampton, VA
February 28, 2026; 4:00 pm, FloCollege/MASN		Northeastern	W 76–65	13–17 (7–10)	Hampton Convocation Center (1,897); Hampton, VA
March 3, 2026; 7:00 pm, FloCollege		at William & Mary	L 85–94	13–18 (7–11)	Kaplan Arena (4,268); Williamsburg, VA
CAA tournament
March 7, 2026; 6:00 pm, FloCollege	(10)	vs. (7) Towson; Second round	L 68–74	13–19	CareFirst Arena (1,770); Washington, D.C.
*Non-conference game. ^{#}Rankings from AP Poll. (#) Tournament seedings in parentheses. All times are in Eastern.
