= John Andrzejek =

American basketball coach

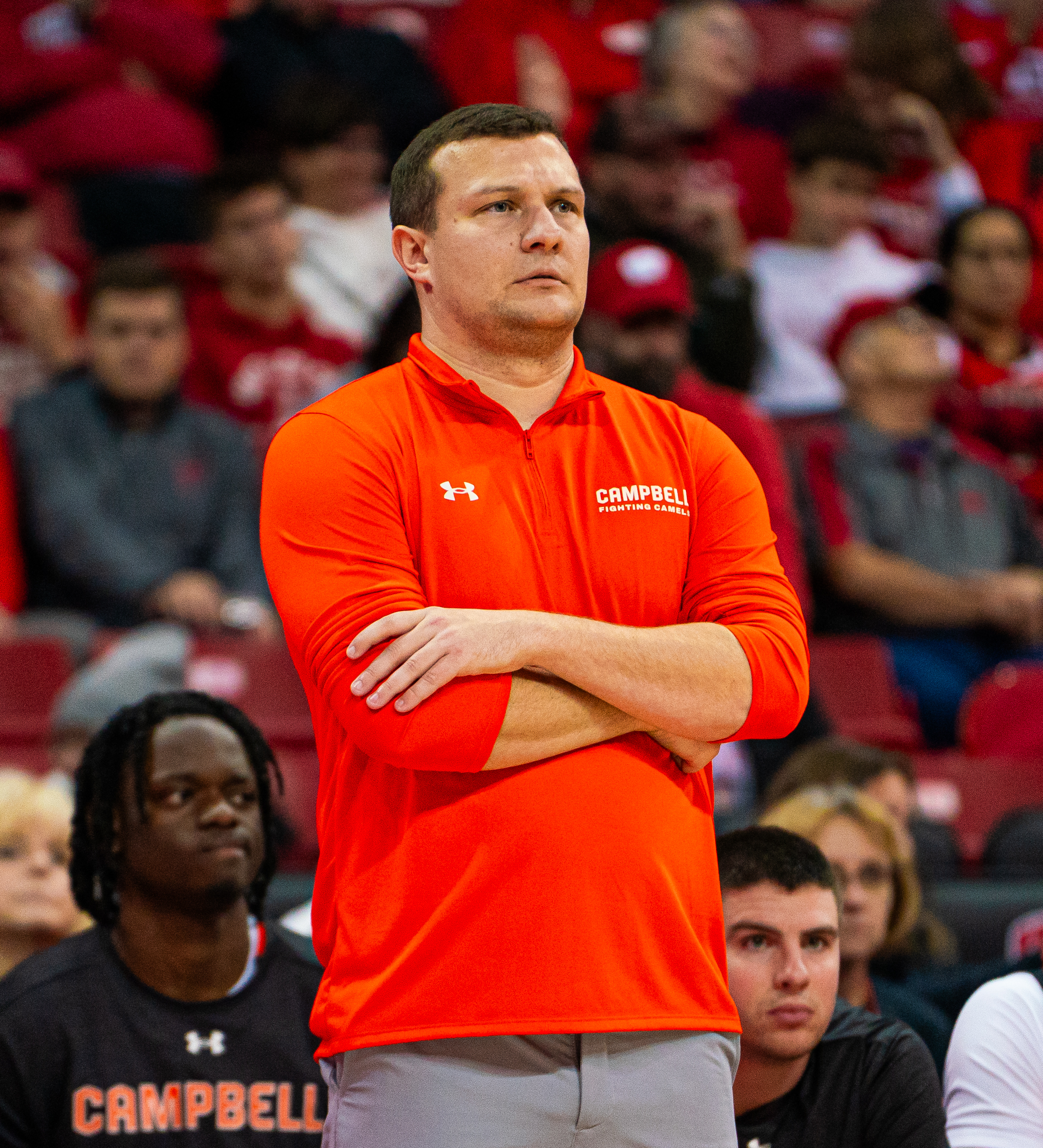
- Andrzejek with Campbell in 2025

Current position
- Title: Associate Head coach
- Team: Louisville
- Conference: ACC

Biographical details
- Education: Columbia ('13)

Coaching career (HC unless noted)
- 2017–2018: Johns Hopkins (assistant)
- 2018–2019: Dartmouth (assistant)
- 2019–2023: Washington State (assistant)
- 2023–2025: Florida (assistant)
- 2025–2026: Campbell
- 2026–present: Louisville (associate HC)

Administrative career (AD unless noted)
- 2012–2014: Columbia (student manager)
- 2014–2016: Columbia (DBO)
- 2016–2017: San Francisco (DBO)

Head coaching record
- Overall: 16–18 (.471)

John Andrzejek is an American college basketball coach who is the current associate head coach at the University of Louisville. He previously served as the head men's basketball coach at Campbell University as well as an assistant for Columbia, San Francisco, Johns Hopkins, Dartmouth, Washington State, and Florida.

== Early life ==
Andrzejek is from Hamilton, New York. He attended Hamilton High School where he played basketball, football, and baseball, helping the baseball team to a state Final Four appearance in 2009. He then attended Columbia University, graduating in two and a half years with an undergraduate degree in philosophy.

== Coaching career ==
While attending Columbia, Andrzejek served as a student manager from 2012 to 2014 and then became the director of basketball operations starting with the 2014–15 season. He later joined the San Francisco Dons in the same role from 2016–17. He worked as an assistant coach for the Johns Hopkins Blue Jays from 2017 to 2018 and then for the Dartmouth Big Green from 2018 to 2019. Afterwards, Andrezejek was an assistant with the Washington State Cougars from 2019 to 2023.

Andrzejek was selected to ESPN's 2020 40 Under 40 list, highlighting the best young college basketball coaches. After his stint at Washington State, he left to become an assistant with the Florida Gators in 2023. In two seasons at Florida, he helped the Gators to winning seasons each year, including the 2024-2025 national championship, in which the team started 30–4 and was a number one seed in the NCAA Tournament. He also helped the Gators win their first Southeastern Conference (SEC) title since 2014.

On March 20, 2025, Andrzejek was announced as the new head coach for Campbell University. He coached a 16-18 team that finished 8-10 in conference play (9th in CAA), making a historic run in the conference tournament ending with a loss to Monmouth in the semifinals. This run marked the team's first ever CAA conference tournament victory, when they defeated Stony Brook 81-69.

On April 1, 2026, Andrzejek resigned after just one season, citing a lack of commitment to basketball from the university, while announcing that he'd be joining Louisville as associate head coach.

== Head coaching record ==
Record table
Season	Team	Overall	Conference	Standing	Postseason
Campbell Fighting Camels (Coastal Athletic Association) (2025–2026)
2025–26	Campbell	16–18	8–10	9th	
Campbell:		16–18 (.471)	8–10 (.444)		
Total:		16–18 (.471)			
National champion Postseason invitational champion Conference regular season champion Conference regular season and conference tournament champion Division regular season champion Division regular season and conference tournament champion Conference tournament champion
