= 2024–25 Coastal Athletic Association men's basketball season =

- League: NCAA Division I
- Sport: Basketball
- Duration: November, 2024 – March, 2025
- Teams: 14

Regular season
- Champion: Towson
- Runners-up: UNC Wilmington
- Season MVP: Tyler Tejada (Towson)
- Top scorer: Abdi Bashir Jr. (Monmouth)

Tournament
- Champions: UNC Wilmington
- Runners-up: Delaware
- Finals MVP: Donovan Newby (UNC Wilmington)

CAA men's basketball seasons
- ← 2023–24 2025–26 →

2024–25 CAA men's basketball standings
	Conf.				Overall
Team	W		L	PCT	W		L	PCT
Towson	16	–	2	.889	22	–	11	.667
UNC Wilmington †	14	–	4	.778	27	–	8	.771
Charleston	13	–	5	.722	24	–	9	.727
William & Mary	11	–	7	.611	17	–	15	.531
Campbell	10	–	8	.556	15	–	17	.469
Monmouth	10	–	8	.556	13	–	20	.394
Northeastern	9	–	9	.500	17	–	15	.531
Drexel	9	–	9	.500	18	–	15	.545
Elon	8	–	10	.444	17	–	16	.515
Hampton	8	–	10	.444	17	–	16	.515
Hofstra	6	–	12	.333	15	–	18	.455
Delaware	5	–	13	.278	16	–	20	.444
Stony Brook	4	–	14	.222	8	–	24	.250
North Carolina A&T	3	–	15	.167	7	–	25	.219
† 2025 CAA tournament winner

The 2024–25 CAA men's basketball season was the 39th season of Coastal Athletic Association basketball, taking place between November 2024 and March 2025. The season ended with the 2025 CAA men's basketball tournament.

This was the final CAA season for Delaware, which joins the C-USA on July 1, 2025.

== Head coaches ==
=== Coaching changes ===
- Chris Mack replaced Pat Kelsey as Charleston's head coach.
- Ivan Thomas replaced Edward Joyner as Hampton's head coach.
- Brian Earl replaced Dane Fischer as William & Mary's head coach.

=== Coaches ===
Team	Head coach	Previous job	Year at school	Record at school	CAA record	CAA championships	NCAA tournaments
Campbell	Kevin McGeehan	Richmond (assoc.)	12	169–182	8–10	0	0
Charleston	Chris Mack	Louisville (HC)	1	0–0	0–0	0	0
Delaware	Martin Ingelsby	Notre Dame (asst.)	9	131–117	63–72	1	1
Drexel	Zach Spiker	Army (HC)	9	113–130	59–76	1	1
Elon	Billy Taylor	Iowa (asst.)	3	21–43	12–24	0	0
Hampton	Ivan Thomas	Georgetown (assoc. HC)	1	0–0	0–0	0	0
Hofstra	Speedy Claxton	Hofstra (asst.)	4	66–34	41–13	0	0
Monmouth	King Rice	Vanderbilt (asst.)	14	207–208	15–21	0	0
North Carolina A&T	Monté Ross	Temple (asst.)	2	7–25	5–13	0	0
Northeastern	Bill Coen	Boston College (asst.)	19	282–284	169–145	2	2
Stony Brook	Geno Ford	Stony Brook (Interim HC)	7	78–78	16–20	0	0
Towson	Pat Skerry	Pittsburgh (asst.)	14	213–199	121–105	0	0
UNC Wilmington	Takayo Siddle	NC State (asst.)	5	79–39	41–21	0	0
William & Mary	Brian Earl	Cornell (HC)	1	0–0	0–0	0	0

Notes:

- All records, appearances, titles, etc. are from time with current school only.
- Year at school includes 2024–25 season.
- Overall and CAA records are from time at current school and are through the end of the 2023–24 season.

== Preseason ==
=== Preseason poll ===
Rank	Team	Points
1	Towson (10)	166
2	Charleston (3)	157
3	UNC Wilmington (1)	143
4	Hofstra	122
5	Delaware	102
6	Northeastern	96
7	William & Mary	91
8	Monmouth	87
9	Stony Brook	80
10	North Carolina A&T	67
11	Drexel	66
12	Elon	46
13	Campbell	27
14	Hampton	24

() first place votes

=== Preseason All-Conference teams ===
Award	Recipients
First Team	Ante Brzovic (Charleston); Gabe Dorsey (William & Mary); Landon Glasper (North Carolina A&T); Kyrese Mullen (Hampton); Tyler Tejada (Towson)
Second Team	CJ Fulton (Charleston); Christian May (Towson); TK Simpkins (Elon); Masai Troutman (Northeastern); Jaret Valencia (Monmouth)
Honorable Mention	Derrin Boyd (Charleston); Joshua Corbin (UNC Wilmington); Jack Collins (Monmouth); Chase Lowe (William & Mary); Bo Montgomery (UNC Wilmington); Joe Octave (Stony Brook); Camian Shell (North Carolina A&T); Jasin Sinani (Campbell); Dylan Williamson (Towson)

Coastal Athletic Association Preseason Player of the Year: Ante Brzovic (Charleston)

== Regular season ==
=== Rankings ===
Legend
	Increase in ranking
	Decrease in ranking
	Not ranked previous week
RV	Received votes
(Italics)	Number of first place votes

		Pre	Wk 2	Wk 3	Wk 4	Wk 5	Wk 6	Wk 7	Wk 8	Wk 9	Wk 10	Wk 11	Wk 12	Wk 13	Wk 14	Wk 15	Wk 16	Wk 17	Wk 18	Wk 19	Wk 20	Final
Campbell	AP	NV	NV	NV	NV	NV	NV	NV	NV	NV	NV	NV	NV	NV	NV	NV	NV	NV	NV	NV	NV	NV
Campbell	C	NV	NV	NV	NV	NV	NV	NV	NV	NV	NV	NV	NV	NV	NV	NV	NV	NV	NV	NV	NV	NV
Charleston	AP	NV	NV	NV	NV	NV	NV	NV	NV	NV	NV	NV	NV	NV	NV	NV	NV	NV	NV	NV	NV	NV
Charleston	C	NV	NV	NV	NV	NV	NV	NV	NV	NV	NV	NV	NV	NV	NV	NV	NV	NV	NV	NV	NV	NV
Delaware	AP	NV	NV	NV	NV	NV	NV	NV	NV	NV	NV	NV	NV	NV	NV	NV	NV	NV	NV	NV	NV	NV
Delaware	C	NV	NV	NV	NV	NV	NV	NV	NV	NV	NV	NV	NV	NV	NV	NV	NV	NV	NV	NV	NV	NV
Drexel	AP	NV	NV	NV	NV	NV	NV	NV	NV	NV	NV	NV	NV	NV	NV	NV	NV	NV	NV	NV	NV	NV
Drexel	C	NV	NV	NV	NV	NV	NV	NV	NV	NV	NV	NV	NV	NV	NV	NV	NV	NV	NV	NV	NV	NV
Elon	AP	NV	NV	NV	NV	NV	NV	NV	NV	NV	NV	NV	NV	NV	NV	NV	NV	NV	NV	NV	NV	NV
Elon	C	NV	NV	NV	NV	NV	NV	NV	NV	NV	NV	NV	NV	NV	NV	NV	NV	NV	NV	NV	NV	NV
Hampton	AP	NV	NV	NV	NV	NV	NV	NV	NV	NV	NV	NV	NV	NV	NV	NV	NV	NV	NV	NV	NV	NV
Hampton	C	NV	NV	NV	NV	NV	NV	NV	NV	NV	NV	NV	NV	NV	NV	NV	NV	NV	NV	NV	NV	NV
Hofstra	AP	NV	NV	RV	NV	NV	NV	NV	NV	NV	NV	NV	NV	NV	NV	NV	NV	NV	NV	NV	NV	NV
Hofstra	C	NV	NV	NV	NV	NV	NV	NV	NV	NV	NV	NV	NV	NV	NV	NV	NV	NV	NV	NV	NV	NV
Monmouth	AP	NV	NV	NV	NV	NV	NV	NV	NV	NV	NV	NV	NV	NV	NV	NV	NV	NV	NV	NV	NV	NV
Monmouth	C	NV	NV	NV	NV	NV	NV	NV	NV	NV	NV	NV	NV	NV	NV	NV	NV	NV	NV	NV	NV	NV
North Carolina A&T	AP	NV	NV	NV	NV	NV	NV	NV	NV	NV	NV	NV	NV	NV	NV	NV	NV	NV	NV	NV	NV	NV
North Carolina A&T	C	NV	NV	NV	NV	NV	NV	NV	NV	NV	NV	NV	NV	NV	NV	NV	NV	NV	NV	NV	NV	NV
Northeastern	AP	NV	NV	NV	NV	NV	NV	NV	NV	NV	NV	NV	NV	NV	NV	NV	NV	NV	NV	NV	NV	NV
Northeastern	C	NV	NV	NV	NV	NV	NV	NV	NV	NV	NV	NV	NV	NV	NV	NV	NV	NV	NV	NV	NV	NV
Stony Brook	AP	NV	NV	NV	NV	NV	NV	NV	NV	NV	NV	NV	NV	NV	NV	NV	NV	NV	NV	NV	NV	NV
Stony Brook	C	NV	NV	NV	NV	NV	NV	NV	NV	NV	NV	NV	NV	NV	NV	NV	NV	NV	NV	NV	NV	NV
Towson	AP	NV	NV	NV	NV	NV	NV	NV	NV	NV	NV	NV	NV	NV	NV	NV	NV	NV	NV	NV	NV	NV
Towson	C	NV	NV	NV	NV	NV	NV	NV	NV	NV	NV	NV	NV	NV	NV	NV	NV	NV	NV	NV	NV	NV
UNC Wilmington	AP	NV	NV	NV	NV	NV	NV	NV	NV	NV	NV	NV	NV	NV	NV	NV	NV	NV	NV	NV	NV	NV
UNC Wilmington	C	NV	NV	NV	NV	NV	NV	NV	NV	NV	NV	NV	NV	NV	NV	NV	NV	NV	NV	NV	NV	NV
William & Mary	AP	NV	NV	NV	NV	NV	NV	NV	NV	NV	NV	NV	NV	NV	NV	NV	NV	NV	NV	NV	NV	NV
William & Mary	C	NV	NV	NV	NV	NV	NV	NV	NV	NV	NV	NV	NV	NV	NV	NV	NV	NV	NV	NV	NV	NV

=== Conference matrix ===
This table summarizes the head-to-head results between teams in conference play.

	Campbell	Charleston	Delaware	Drexel	Elon	Hampton	Hofstra	Monmouth	North Carolina A&T	Northeastern	Stony Brook	Towson	UNC Wilmington	William & Mary
vs. Campbell	–	0-0	0–0	0–1	0–0	0–1	0–0	0–0	0–0	0–0	0–0	0–0	1–0	0–0
vs. Charleston	0–0	–	0–0	0–0	0–0	0–1	0–1	1–0	0–0	0–0	0–0	0–1	0–0	0–0
vs. Delaware	0–0	0–0	–	0–0	0–0	1–0	0–0	0–1	0–1	1–0	0–0	0–0	0–0	0–0
vs. Drexel	1–0	0–0	0–0	–	0–0	0–0	0–0	0–0	0–1	0–0	0–1	1–0	0–0	0–0
vs. Elon	0–0	0–0	0–0	0–0	–	0–1	0–0	0–0	0–1	0–0	0–0	0–0	0–0	1–0
vs. Hampton	1–0	1–0	0–1	0–0	1–0	–	0–0	0–0	0–1	0–0	0–0	0–0	0–0	0–0
vs. Hofstra	0–0	1–0	0–0	0–0	0–0	0–0	–	0–0	0–0	0–1	0–0	0–0	0–1	1–0
vs. Monmouth	0–0	0–1	1–0	0–0	0–0	0–0	0–0	–	0–0	0–0	0–1	0–0	1–0	0–0
vs. North Carolina A&T	0–0	0–0	1–0	1–0	1–0	0–0	0–0	0–0	–	0–0	0–0	0–0	0–0	1–0
vs. Northeastern	0–0	0–0	0–1	0–0	0–0	0–0	1–0	0–0	0–0	–	0–1	1–0	0–0	0–0
vs. Stony Brook	0–0	0–0	0–0	1–0	0–0	0–0	0–0	1–0	0–0	1–0	–	0–0	0–0	1–0
vs. Towson	0–0	1–0	0–0	0–1	0–0	0–0	0–0	0–0	0–0	0–1	0–0	–	0–1	0–0
vs. UNC Wilmington	0–1	0–0	0–0	0–0	0–0	0–0	1–0	0–1	0–0	0–0	0–0	1–0	–	0–0
vs. William & Mary	0–0	0–0	0–0	0–0	0–1	0–0	0–1	0–0	0–1	0–0	0–1	0–0	0–0	–
Total	2-1	3–1	2–2	2–2	2–1	2–3	2–2	2–2	0–5	2–2	0–4	3–1	2–2	4–0

== Postseason ==
=== NCAA tournament ===
The CAA had one bid to the 2025 NCAA Division I men's basketball tournament, that being the automatic bid of UNC Wilmington by winning the conference tournament.

Seed	Region	School	First Four	First Round	Second Round	Sweet 16	Elite Eight	Final Four	Championship
14	West	UNC Wilmington	Bye	L 72–82 vs. (3) Texas Tech	DNP				
Bids		W-L (%):	0–0 (–)	0–1 (.000)	0–0 (–)	0–0 (–)	0–0 (–)	0–0 (–)	TOTAL: 0–1 (.000)

=== National Invitation tournament ===
Towson received an automatic bid to the 2025 National Invitation Tournament as regular-season conference champions.

Seed	School	First Round	Second Round	Quarterfinals	Semifinals	Championship
Bids	W-L (%):	0–0 (–)	0–0 (–)	0–0 (–)	0–0 (–)	TOTAL: 0–0 (–)

=== College Basketball Invitational ===
School	First Round	Quarterfinals	Semifinals	Championship
Elon	L 78–83 vs. Army	DNP		
W-L (%):	0–1 (.000)	0–0 (–)	0–0 (–)	TOTAL: 0–1 (.000)

== Awards and honors ==
=== Regular season ===
==== CAA Player & Rookie of the Week ====
Week	Date Awarded	Player of the week	Rookie of the week	Reference
Week 1	November 11	Ante Brzovic – Charleston	Collin O'Connor – Stony Brook	
Week 2	November 18	Jean Aranguren – Hofstra	Ryan Williams – Northeastern	
Week 2	November 18	Abdi Bashir Jr. – Monmouth	Ryan Williams – Northeastern	
Week 3	November 25	Nick Dorn – Elon	Izaiah Pasha – Delaware	
Week 4	December 2	Cruz Davis – Hofstra	Izaiah Pasha (2) – Delaware	
Week 5	December 9	Rashad King – Northeastern	Collin O'Connor (2) – Stony Brook	
Week 6	December 16	Nolan Dorsey – Campbell	Justas Stonkus – Charleston	
Week 7	December 23	Donovan Newby – UNC Wilmington	Etienne Strothers – Hampton	
Week 7	December 23	Sam Sherry – Elon	Etienne Strothers – Hampton	
Week 8	December 30	Deywilk Tavarez – Charleston	Daniel Johnson – Hampton	
Week 9	January 6	Ante Brzovic (2) – Charleston	Isaiah Mbeng – William & Mary	
Week 10	January 13	Nendah Tarke – Towson	Caleb Embeya – Towson	
Week 11	January 20	John Camden – Delaware	Izaiah Pasha (3) – Delaware	
Week 11	January 20	Deywilk Tavarez (2) – Charleston	Izaiah Pasha (3) – Delaware	
Week 12	January 27	Colby Duggan – Campbell	Isaiah Mbeng (2) – William & Mary	
Week 12	January 27	Bo Montgomery – UNC Wilmington	Isaiah Mbeng (2) – William & Mary	
Week 13	February 3	Madison Durr – Monmouth	Collin O'Connor (3) – Stony Brook	
Week 14	February 10	Ante Brzovic (3) – Charleston	Izaiah Pasha (4) – Delaware	
Week 14	February 10	Rashad King (2) – Northeastern	Izaiah Pasha (4) – Delaware	
Week 15	February 17	Colby Duggan (2) – Campbell	Izaiah Pasha (5) – Delaware	
Week 15	February 17	Rashad King (3) – Northeastern	Izaiah Pasha (5) – Delaware	
Week 16	February 24	Jahnathan Lamothe – North Carolina A&T	Izaiah Pasha (6) – Delaware	
Week 16	February 24	TK Simpkins – Elon	Izaiah Pasha (6) – Delaware	
Week 17	March 3	Abdi Bashir Jr. (2) - Monmouth	Collin O'Connor (4) - Stony Brook	

=== Postseason ===
==== CAA All-Conference teams and awards ====
Award	Recipients
Player of the Year	Tyler Tejada (Towson)
Coach of the Year	Pat Skerry (Towson)
Rookie of the Year	Izaiah Pasha (Delaware)
Defensive Player of the Year	Nolan Dorsey (Campbell)
Sixth Man of the Year	Nendah Tarke (Towson)
Dean Ehlers Leadership Award	Khamari McGriff (UNC Wilmington)
Scholar-Athlete of the Year	CJ Fulton (Charleston)
First Team	Tyler Tejada (Towson); Ante Brzovic (Charleston); Colby Duggan (Campbell); Abdi Bashir Jr. (Monmouth); Rashad King (Northeastern)
Second Team	TK Simpkins (Elon); John Camden (Delaware); Donovan Newby (UNC Wilmington); Dylan Williamson (Towson); Gabe Dorsey (William & Mary)
Third Team	Derrin Boyd (Charleston); CJ Fulton (Charleston); Kobe MaGee (Drexel); Noah Farrakhan (Hampton); CJ Luster (Stony Brook)
All-Defensive Team	Nolan Dorsey (Campbell); Cole Hargrove (Drexel); Matthew Van Komen (Elon); Collin Metcalf (Northeastern); Sean Moore (UNC Wilmington)
All-Rookie Team	Izaiah Pasha (Delaware); Justas Stonkus (Charleston); Daniel Johnson (Hampton); Collin O'Connor (Stony Brook); Isaiah Mbeng (William & Mary)
All-Tournament Team	Donovan Newby (UNC Wilmington); Khamari McGriff (UNC Wilmington); Noah Ross (UNC Wilmington); John Camden (Delaware); Niels Lane (Delaware); Izaiah Pasha (Delaware)
Tournament MVP	Donovan Newby (UNC Wilmington)

== Attendance ==
Team	Arena	Capacity	Game 1	Game 2	Game 3	Game 4	Game 5	Game 6	Game 7	Game 8	Total	Average	% of Capacity
Team	Arena	Capacity	Game 9	Game 10	Game 11	Game 12	Game 13	Game 14	Game 15	Game 16	Total	Average	% of Capacity
Campbell	John W. Pope Jr. Convocation Center	3,095											0%
Charleston	TD Arena	5,100											0%
Delaware	Bob Carpenter Center	5,100											0%
Drexel	Daskalakis Athletic Center	2,509											0%
Elon	Schar Center	5,100											0%
Hampton	Hampton Convocation Center	7,200											0%
Hofstra	Mack Sports Complex	5,023											0%
Monmouth	OceanFirst Bank Center	4,100											0%
North Carolina A&T	Corbett Sports Center	5,000											0%
Northeastern	Matthews Arena	6,000											0%
Stony Brook	Island Federal Credit Union Arena	4,160											0%
Towson	SECU Arena	5,200											0%
UNC Wilmington	Trask Coliseum	5,200											0%
William & Mary	Kaplan Arena	8,600											0%
