= 2024–25 Campbell Fighting Camels men's basketball team =

American college basketball season

2024–25 Campbell Fighting Camels men's basketball
- Conference: Coastal Athletic Association
- Record: 15–17 (10–8 CAA)
- Head coach: Kevin McGeehan (12th season)
- Associate head coach: Chris Long
- Assistant coaches: Emmanuel Matey; Kevin Grek; Brett Carey
- Home arena: Gore Arena

2024–25 CAA men's basketball standings
	Conf.				Overall
Team	W		L	PCT	W		L	PCT
Towson	16	–	2	.889	22	–	11	.667
UNC Wilmington †	14	–	4	.778	27	–	8	.771
Charleston	13	–	5	.722	24	–	9	.727
William & Mary	11	–	7	.611	17	–	15	.531
Campbell	10	–	8	.556	15	–	17	.469
Monmouth	10	–	8	.556	13	–	20	.394
Northeastern	9	–	9	.500	17	–	15	.531
Drexel	9	–	9	.500	18	–	15	.545
Elon	8	–	10	.444	17	–	16	.515
Hampton	8	–	10	.444	17	–	16	.515
Hofstra	6	–	12	.333	15	–	18	.455
Delaware	5	–	13	.278	16	–	20	.444
Stony Brook	4	–	14	.222	8	–	24	.250
North Carolina A&T	3	–	15	.167	7	–	25	.219
† 2025 CAA tournament winner

The 2024–25 Campbell Fighting Camels men's basketball team represented Campbell University during the 2024–25 NCAA Division I men's basketball season. The Fighting Camels, led by 12th-year head coach Kevin McGeehan, played their home games at Gore Arena in Buies Creek, North Carolina as second-year members of the Coastal Athletic Association.

== Previous season ==
The Fighting Camels finished the 2023–24 season 14–18, 8–10 in CAA play to finish in ninth place. They were defeated by Monmouth in the second round of the CAA tournament.

== Roster ==
2024–25 Campbell Fighting Camels men's basketball team
Players
Coaches

Pos.	#	Name	Height	Weight	Year	Previous school	Hometown
G	0	Gediminas Mokseckas	6 ft 4 in (1.93 m)	200 lb (91 kg)	GS	Archbishop Ryan High School	Vilnius, Lithuania
G	1	Tasos Cook	6 ft 2 in (1.88 m)	200 lb (91 kg)	Sr	Vincennes	Columbus, Ohio
F	2	Colby Duggan	6 ft 7 in (2.01 m)	210 lb (95 kg)	So	Phillips Academy	Monson, Massachusetts
G	4	Broc Bidwell	6 ft 0 in (1.83 m)	170 lb (77 kg)	RS Jr	Milton High School	Cumming, Georgia
G	5	Elijah Walsh	6 ft 5 in (1.96 m)	185 lb (84 kg)	Jr	The Master's Academy	Leeds, England
G	6	Bragi Guðmundsson	6 ft 5 in (1.96 m)	175 lb (79 kg)	So	Penn State	Grindavík, Iceland
G	7	Cam Gregory	6 ft 5 in (1.96 m)	165 lb (75 kg)	Jr	Saint Francis (PA)	Accokeek, Maryland
G	10	Jacob Lawton	5 ft 6 in (1.68 m)	150 lb (68 kg)	Fr	Millbrook High School	Raleigh, North Carolina
G	11	Omar Harris	6 ft 3 in (1.91 m)	180 lb (82 kg)	Jr	South Central High School	Plymouth, North Carolina
F	12	Israel Yaw	6 ft 9 in (2.06 m)	205 lb (93 kg)	Jr	Maryland Eastern Shore	Georgetown, Guyana
G	13	Jasin Sinani	6 ft 3 in (1.91 m)	195 lb (88 kg)	Sr	Milwaukee	Oak Creek, Wisconsin
F	14	Caleb Zurliene	6 ft 8 in (2.03 m)	205 lb (93 kg)	GS	McKendree	Aviston, Illinois
F	15	Terren Frank	6 ft 8 in (2.03 m)	230 lb (104 kg)	GS	Idaho	Los Angeles, California
G	21	Nolan Dorsey	6 ft 5 in (1.96 m)	205 lb (93 kg)	GS	Holy Cross	Knightdale, North Carolina
F	23	Eric Van Der Heijden	6 ft 9 in (2.06 m)	225 lb (102 kg)	Sr	UNC Wilmington	Raleigh, North Carolina
C	24	Wesley Johnson	7 ft 0 in (2.13 m)	230 lb (104 kg)	Jr	Leesville Road High School	Raleigh, North Carolina

Head coach

- Kevin McGeehan (Gettysburg)

Assistant coach(es)

- Chris Long (Elon)
- Emmanuel Matey (Gannon)
- Kevin Grek (Kean)
- Brett Carey (UNC Asheville)

Legend

- (C) Team captain
- (S) Suspended
- (I) Ineligible
- (W) Walk-on
- Injured
- Current redshirt

Roster
Last update: October 29, 2024

== Schedule and results ==
Date time, TV	Rank^{#}	Opponent^{#}	Result	Record	Site (attendance) city, state
Exhibition
October 18, 2024*; 7:00 p.m.		Allen	W 73–49	–	Gore Arena; Buies Creek, NC
Non-conference regular season
November 4, 2024*; 7:30 p.m., FloHoops		Pfeiffer	W 96–49	1–0	Gore Arena (1,637); Buies Creek, NC
November 6, 2024*; 7:00 p.m., ACCNX/ESPN+		at Virginia	L 56–65	1–1	John Paul Jones Arena (13,414); Charlottesville, VA
November 10, 2024*; 2:00 p.m., FloHoops		Saint Francis	L 64–65	1–2	Gore Arena (1,069); Buies Creek, NC
November 13, 2024*; 7:00 p.m., FloHoops		Newberry	W 83–40	2–2	Gore Arena (1,107); Buies Creek, NC
November 17, 2024*; 1:00 p.m., ESPN+		at Navy	W 86–66	3–2	Alumni Hall (902); Annapolis, MD
November 22, 2024*; 6:00 p.m., BTN		at Ohio State	L 60–104	3–3	Value City Arena (10,557); Columbus, OH
November 24, 2024*; 4:00 p.m., ESPN+		at Evansville	L 53–66	3–4	Ford Center (3,823); Evansville, IN
November 30, 2024*; 1:00 p.m., ESPN+		at Green Bay	W 72–66	4–4	Resch Center (1,920); Ashwaubenon, WI
December 4, 2024*; 7:00 p.m., FloHoops		Coastal Carolina	L 57–58	4–5	Gore Arena (1,283); Buies Creek, NC
December 12, 2024*; 7:00 p.m., ESPN+		at The Citadel	W 86–58	5–5	McAlister Field House (835); Charleston, SC
December 15, 2024*; 2:00 p.m.		at Morgan State	L 76–86	5–6	Talmadge L. Hill Field House (117); Baltimore, MD
December 18, 2024*; 7:00 p.m., FloHoops		Longwood	L 55–77	5–7	Gore Arena (1,077); Buies Creek, NC
December 29, 2024*; 8:00 p.m., ACCN		at North Carolina	L 81–97	5–8	Dean Smith Center (19,959); Chapel Hill, NC
CAA regular season
January 2, 2025; 7:00 p.m., FloHoops		Drexel	W 57–54	6–8 (1–0)	Gore Arena (1,051); Buies Creek, NC
January 4, 2025; 7:00 p.m., FloHoops		at UNC Wilmington	L 69–77	6–9 (1–1)	Trask Coliseum (5,200); Wilmington, NC
January 9, 2025; 7:00 p.m., FloHoops		at Hampton	W 66–55	7–9 (2–1)	Hampton Convocation Center (1,257); Hampton, VA
January 13, 2025; 9:00 p.m., CBSSN		at Elon	L 68–81	7–10 (2–2)	Schar Center (2,061); Elon, NC
January 16, 2025; 7:00 p.m., FloHoops		Charleston	L 61–67	7–11 (2–3)	Gore Arena (1,359); Buies Creek, NC
January 18, 2025; 2:00 p.m., FloHoops		Monmouth	W 81–58	8–11 (3–3)	Gore Arena (1,615); Buies Creek, NC
January 23, 2025; 7:00 p.m., FloHoops		at Stony Brook	W 79–54	9–11 (4–3)	Stony Brook Arena (1,702); Stony Brook, NY
January 25, 2025; 12:00 p.m., CBSSN		at Hofstra	W 69–67 ^{OT}	10–11 (5–3)	Mack Sports Complex (1,565); Hempstead, NY
January 30, 2025; 7:00 p.m., FloHoops		William & Mary	W 96–55	11–11 (6–3)	Gore Arena (1,459); Buies Creek, NC
February 1, 2025; 1:00 p.m., FloHoops		Hofstra	W 75–52	12–11 (7–3)	Gore Arena (1,223); Buies Creek, NC
February 6, 2025; 7:00 p.m., FloHoops		Elon	W 76–58	13–11 (8–3)	Gore Arena (1,913); Buies Creek, NC
February 10, 2025; 8:00 p.m., CBSSN		North Carolina A&T	W 66–62	14–11 (9–3)	Gore Arena (2,232); Buies Creek, NC
February 13, 2025; 7:00 p.m., FloHoops		at Northeastern	L 58–67	14–12 (9–4)	Matthews Arena (608); Boston, MA
February 15, 2025; 4:00 p.m., FloHoops		at Delaware	W 96–91	15–12 (10–4)	Bob Carpenter Center (2,347); Newark, DE
February 20, 2025; 7:00 p.m., FloHoops		at North Carolina A&T	L 50–53	15–13 (10–5)	Corbett Sports Center (1,259); Greensboro, NC
February 22, 2025; 2:00 p.m., FloHoops		Towson	L 67–76	15–14 (10–6)	Gore Arena (2,271); Buies Creek, NC
February 27, 2025; 7:00 p.m., FloHoops		UNC Wilmington	L 60–79	15–15 (10–7)	Gore Arena (2,350); Buies Creek, NC
March 1, 2025; 6:00 p.m., FloHoops		at Charleston	L 65–87	15–16 (10–8)	TD Arena (5,165); Charleston, SC
CAA tournament
March 8, 2025; 2:30 p.m., FloHoops	(5)	vs. (12) Delaware; Second round	L 62–79	15–17	CareFirst Arena (2,310); Washington, D.C.
*Non-conference game. ^{#}Rankings from AP Poll. (#) Tournament seedings in parentheses. All times are in Eastern.
