= 2024–25 Northeastern Huskies men's basketball team =

American college basketball season

2024–25 Northeastern Huskies men's basketball
- Conference: Coastal Athletic Association
- Record: 17–15 (9–9 CAA)
- Head coach: Bill Coen (19th season)
- Assistant coaches: Matt Janning; Brian McDonald; Joel Smith
- Home arena: Matthews Arena

2024–25 CAA men's basketball standings
	Conf.				Overall
Team	W		L	PCT	W		L	PCT
Towson	16	–	2	.889	22	–	11	.667
UNC Wilmington †	14	–	4	.778	27	–	8	.771
Charleston	13	–	5	.722	24	–	9	.727
William & Mary	11	–	7	.611	17	–	15	.531
Campbell	10	–	8	.556	15	–	17	.469
Monmouth	10	–	8	.556	13	–	20	.394
Northeastern	9	–	9	.500	17	–	15	.531
Drexel	9	–	9	.500	18	–	15	.545
Elon	8	–	10	.444	17	–	16	.515
Hampton	8	–	10	.444	17	–	16	.515
Hofstra	6	–	12	.333	15	–	18	.455
Delaware	5	–	13	.278	16	–	20	.444
Stony Brook	4	–	14	.222	8	–	24	.250
North Carolina A&T	3	–	15	.167	7	–	25	.219
† 2025 CAA tournament winner

The 2024–25 Northeastern Huskies men's basketball team represented Northeastern University during the 2024–25 NCAA Division I men's basketball season. The Huskies, led by 19th-year head coach Bill Coen, played their home games at Matthews Arena in Boston, Massachusetts as members of the Coastal Athletic Association (CAA).

== Previous season ==
The Huskies finished the 2023–24 season 12–20, 7–11 in CAA play to finish in tenth place. They were defeated by Stony Brook in the second round of the CAA tournament.

== Roster ==
2024–25 Northeastern Huskies men's basketball team
Players
Coaches

Pos.	#	Name	Height	Weight	Year	Previous school	Hometown
G	0	Nate Francois (W)	6 ft 1 in (1.85 m)	200 lb (91 kg)	Sr	Brighton High School	Boston, MA
G	1	Masai Troutman	6 ft 4 in (1.93 m)	202 lb (92 kg)	Jr	St. Andrew's Episcopal School	Frederick, MD
F	2	Alexander Nwagha	6 ft 7 in (2.01 m)	233 lb (106 kg)	GS	Orangeville Prep	Milton, ON
G	3	LA Pratt	6 ft 5 in (1.96 m)	192 lb (87 kg)	Jr	Elon	Columbus, OH
G	4	Rashad King	6 ft 6 in (1.98 m)	204 lb (93 kg)	Jr	Evans High School	Evans, GA
F	7	Youri Fritz	6 ft 8 in (2.03 m)	215 lb (98 kg)	Jr	Canisius	Tiel, Netherlands
G	8	William Kermoury	6 ft 5 in (1.96 m)	194 lb (88 kg)	So	Södertälje BBK	Stockholm, Sweden
G	10	Harold Woods	6 ft 5 in (1.96 m)	215 lb (98 kg)	Jr	Hammond High School	Hammond, IN
G	11	JB Frankel	6 ft 3 in (1.91 m)	192 lb (87 kg)	So	Brewster Academy	New York City, NY
G	20	Ryan Williams	6 ft 4 in (1.93 m)	180 lb (82 kg)	Fr	Malvern Prep	Phoenixville, PA
G	22	Luca Soroa	6 ft 6 in (1.98 m)	195 lb (88 kg)	Fr	212 Sports Academy	Valencia, Spain
F	30	Sam Thomson	6 ft 8 in (2.03 m)	232 lb (105 kg)	GS	Colgate	Kitchener–Waterloo, ON
C	45	Collin Metcalf	6 ft 9 in (2.06 m)	233 lb (106 kg)	Jr	Mercersburg Academy	Nortorf, Germany

Head coach

- Bill Coen (Hamilton)

Assistant coach(es)

- Matt Janning (Northeastern)
- Brian McDonald (Northeastern)
- Joel Smith (Northeastern)

Legend

- (C) Team captain
- (S) Suspended
- (I) Ineligible
- (W) Walk-on
- Injured
- Current redshirt

Roster
Last update: November 3, 2024

== Schedule and results ==
Date time, TV	Rank^{#}	Opponent^{#}	Result	Record	Site (attendance) city, state
Non-conference regular season
November 4, 2024*; 7:30 p.m., ESPN+		at Boston University	W 80–72	1–0	Case Gym; Boston, MA
November 10, 2024*; 2:00 p.m., NESN/FloHoops		Princeton	L 76–79	1–1	Matthews Arena (1,732); Boston, MA
November 13, 2024*; 7:00 p.m., NESN/FloHoops		Harvard	W 78–56	2–1	Matthews Arena (1,477); Boston, MA
November 16, 2024*; 6:00 p.m.		vs. Central Connecticut; Atlantic Slam	W 80–62	3–1	Avenir Centre (2,173); Moncton, NB
November 22, 2024*; 1:00 p.m.		vs. FIU; Homewood Suites Classic	W 60–58	4–1	Alico Arena (57); Fort Myers, FL
November 23, 2024*; 1:00 p.m., ESPN+		at Florida Gulf Coast; Homewood Suites Classic	W 59–55	5–1	Alico Arena (1,543); Fort Myers, FL
November 24, 2024*; 12:00 p.m.		vs. Cal State Bakersfield; Homewood Suites Classic	L 60–68	5–2	Alico Arena (123); Fort Myers, FL
November 30, 2024*; 1:00 p.m., ESPN+		at Vermont	L 64–68	5–3	Patrick Gym (2,316); Burlington, VT
December 3, 2024*; 7:00 p.m., NESN/FloHoops		La Salle	W 82–68	6–3	Matthews Arena (687); Boston, MA
December 8, 2024*; 2:00 p.m., NESN/FloHoops		Colgate	W 78–75	7–3	Matthews Arena (1,009); Boston, MA
December 15, 2024*; 1:00 p.m., ESPN+		at Old Dominion	W 75–71	8–3	Chartway Arena (4,050); Norfolk, VA
December 18, 2024*; 7:00 p.m., NESN/ESPN+		at UMass	L 72–77	8–4	Mullins Center (2,033); Amherst, MA
December 29, 2024*; 1:30 p.m., Peacock		at Northwestern	L 60–85	8–5	Welsh–Ryan Arena (5,944); Evanston, IL
CAA regular season
January 2, 2025; 7:00 p.m., FloHoops		Delaware	W 80–77	9–5 (1–0)	Matthews Arena (602); Boston, MA
January 4, 2025; 12:00 p.m., NESN+/FloHoops		Hofstra	L 37–55	9–6 (1–1)	Matthews Arena (872); Boston, MA
January 9, 2025; 7:00 p.m., FloHoops		at Towson	L 73–80	9–7 (1–2)	TU Arena (1,020); Towson, MD
January 11, 2025; 7:00 p.m., FloHoops		at Stony Brook	W 70–66	10–7 (2–2)	Stony Brook Arena (2,367); Stony Brook, NY
January 16, 2025; 7:00 p.m., FloHoops		at UNC Wilmington	L 72–80	10–8 (2–3)	Trask Coliseum (5,200); Wilmington, NC
January 18, 2025; 5:00 p.m., FloHoops		at Charleston	L 85–87	10–9 (2–4)	TD Arena (5,132); Charleston, SC
January 23, 2025; 7:00 p.m., FloHoops		Drexel	W 70–61	11–9 (3–4)	Matthews Arena (1,237); Boston, MA
January 27, 2025; 9:00 p.m., CBSSN		Towson	L 65–75	11–10 (3–5)	Matthews Arena (645); Boston, MA
January 30, 2025; 7:00 p.m., FloHoops		at Hampton	W 78–69	12–10 (4–5)	Hampton Convocation Center (757); Hampton, VA
February 1, 2025; 7:00 p.m., FloHoops		at Elon	L 60–71	12–11 (4–6)	Schar Center (2,621); Elon, NC
February 6, 2025; 7:00 p.m., FloHoops		at Hofstra	W 77–68	13–11 (5–6)	Mack Sports Complex (1,224); Hempstead, NY
February 8, 2025; 4:00 p.m., NESN+/FloHoops		Hampton	L 75–84	13–12 (5–7)	Matthews Arena (1,150); Boston, MA
February 13, 2025; 7:00 p.m., NESN/FloHoops		Campbell	W 67–58	14–12 (6–7)	Matthews Arena (608); Boston, MA
February 15, 2025; 3:30 p.m., CBSSN		Stony Brook	W 71–60	15–12 (7–7)	Matthews Arena (1,124); Boston, MA
February 20, 2025; 7:00 p.m., FloHoops		Charleston	L 62–73	15–13 (7–8)	Matthews Arena (1,227); Boston, MA
February 24, 2025; 7:00 p.m., CBSSN		at Monmouth	L 73–78	15–14 (7–9)	OceanFirst Bank Center (1,862); West Long Branch, NJ
February 27, 2025; 7:00 p.m., NESN+/FloHoops		North Carolina A&T	W 69–55	16–14 (8–9)	Matthews Arena (1,164); Boston, MA
March 1, 2025; 2:00 p.m., FloHoops		at William & Mary	W 70–68	17–14 (9–9)	Kaplan Arena (4,355); Williamsburg, VA
CAA tournament
March 8, 2025; 6:00 p.m., FloHoops	(7)	vs. (10) Hampton; Second round	L 65–70	17–15	CareFirst Arena; Washington, D.C.
*Non-conference game. ^{#}Rankings from AP poll. (#) Tournament seedings in parentheses. All times are in Eastern.
