= 2024–25 Hampton Pirates basketball team =

American college basketball season

2024–25 Hampton Pirates basketball
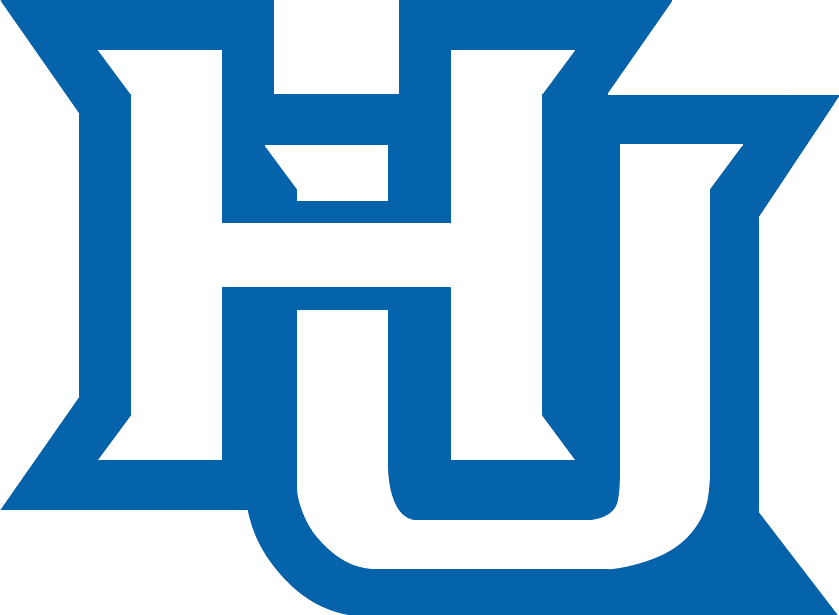
- Conference: Coastal Athletic Association
- Record: 17–16 (8–10 CAA)
- Head coach: Ivan Thomas (1st season)
- Associate head coach: Brian Graves; Greg Fahey
- Assistant coaches: Calvin Cage; Mike Carr; Kyron Cartwright
- Home arena: Hampton Convocation Center

2024–25 CAA men's basketball standings
	Conf.				Overall
Team	W		L	PCT	W		L	PCT
Towson	16	–	2	.889	22	–	11	.667
UNC Wilmington †	14	–	4	.778	27	–	8	.771
Charleston	13	–	5	.722	24	–	9	.727
William & Mary	11	–	7	.611	17	–	15	.531
Campbell	10	–	8	.556	15	–	17	.469
Monmouth	10	–	8	.556	13	–	20	.394
Northeastern	9	–	9	.500	17	–	15	.531
Drexel	9	–	9	.500	18	–	15	.545
Elon	8	–	10	.444	17	–	16	.515
Hampton	8	–	10	.444	17	–	16	.515
Hofstra	6	–	12	.333	15	–	18	.455
Delaware	5	–	13	.278	16	–	20	.444
Stony Brook	4	–	14	.222	8	–	24	.250
North Carolina A&T	3	–	15	.167	7	–	25	.219
† 2025 CAA tournament winner

The 2024–25 Hampton Pirates basketball team represented Hampton University during the 2024–25 NCAA Division I men's basketball season. The Pirates, led by first-year head coach Ivan Thomas, played their home games at the Hampton Convocation Center in Hampton, Virginia as members of the Coastal Athletic Association.

== Previous season ==
The Pirates finished the 2023–24 season 9–24, 3–15 in CAA play to finish in 14th (last) place. They upset Elon, before falling to Delaware in the second round of the CAA tournament.

On March 11, 2024, the school announced that they would be parting ways with head coach Edward Joyner, ending his 15-year tenure with the team. On March 14, the school announced that Georgetown associate head coach Ivan Thomas would be named the Pirates' new head coach.

== Roster ==
2024–25 Hampton Pirates men's basketball team
Players
Coaches

Pos.	#	Name	Height	Weight	Year	Previous school	Hometown
G	0	George Beale Jr.	6 ft 4 in (1.93 m)	200 lb (91 kg)	Jr	Norfolk State	Suffolk, Virginia
G	1	Noah Farrakhan	6 ft 1 in (1.85 m)	170 lb (77 kg)	GS	West Virginia	Newark, New Jersey
G	2	Trevor Smith	6 ft 0 in (1.83 m)	165 lb (75 kg)	So	Richmond	Newport News, Virginia
F	3	Kyrese Mullen	6 ft 7 in (2.01 m)	230 lb (104 kg)	Jr	Massanutten Military Academy	Norfolk, Virginia
G/F	4	Daniel Nixon	6 ft 7 in (2.01 m)	225 lb (102 kg)	RS Jr	Western Texas College	Bronx, New York
G	5	Etienne Strothers	6 ft 2 in (1.88 m)	170 lb (77 kg)	RS Fr	Appalachian State	Newport News, Virginia
G	7	Ryan Hite	6 ft 4 in (1.93 m)	210 lb (95 kg)	RS Fr	Converse	Suffolk, Virginia
G	8	Elijah Kennedy	6 ft 4 in (1.93 m)	180 lb (82 kg)	Jr	Texas State	Virginia Beach, Virginia
F	10	Richard Goods	6 ft 9 in (2.06 m)	225 lb (102 kg)	Fr	Grimsley High School	Greensboro, North Carolina
G	11	KJ Satterfield	6 ft 4 in (1.93 m)	180 lb (82 kg)	So	UAB	Bronx, New York
G	12	Tyler Rice	6 ft 1 in (1.85 m)	190 lb (86 kg)	Sr	East Tennessee State	Columbia, South Carolina
G	13	Daniel Johnson	6 ft 7 in (2.01 m)	—	Fr	Brewster Academy	Chicago, Illinois
F	15	Eunique Rink	6 ft 10 in (2.08 m)	220 lb (100 kg)	Fr	College Achieve Asbury Park	Newark, New Jersey
G	22	Kellan Lewis	6 ft 0 in (1.83 m)	165 lb (75 kg)	Fr	Lake Highland Prep	Orlando, Florida
G/F	23	Dan Banister Jr.	6 ft 6 in (1.98 m)	190 lb (86 kg)	GS	Cape Henry Collegiate School	Chesapeake, Virginia
F	25	Xzavier Long	6 ft 7 in (2.01 m)	190 lb (86 kg)	Jr	Canisius	Washington, D.C.
G	30	Hamza Asadallah	6 ft 1 in (1.85 m)	—	Fr	American School	Kuwait City, Kuwait
G	31	Wayne Bristol Jr.	6 ft 6 in (1.98 m)	195 lb (88 kg)	GS	Georgetown	Upper Marlboro, Maryland

Head coach

- Ivan Thomas (VCU)

Assistant coach(es)

- Brian Graves (Hampton)
- Greg Fahey (Marist)
- Calvin Cage (Buffalo)
- Jack Manning (Providence)
- Kyron Cartwright (Providence)

Legend

- (C) Team captain
- (S) Suspended
- (I) Ineligible
- (W) Walk-on
- Injured
- Current redshirt

Roster
Last update: November 1, 2024

== Schedule and results ==
Date time, TV	Rank^{#}	Opponent^{#}	Result	Record	Site (attendance) city, state
Exhibition
October 17, 2024*; 7:00 pm		Bowie State	L 71–73	–	Hampton Convocation Center (378); Hampton, VA
Regular season
November 4, 2024*; 7:00 pm, FloHoops		Mid-Atlantic Christian	W 110–53	1–0	Hampton Convocation Center (917); Hampton, VA
November 8, 2024*; 7:00 pm, ESPN+		at George Washington	L 54–82	1–1	Charles E. Smith Center (2,118); Washington, D.C.
November 12, 2024*; 6:30 pm, FS1		at Providence	L 51–60	1–2	Amica Mutual Pavilion (7,821); Providence, RI
November 16, 2024*; 8:00 pm, FloHoops		Norfolk State; Battle of the Bay	L 58–67	1–3	Hampton Convocation Center (6,539); Hampton, VA
November 19, 2024*; 7:00 pm, ESPN+		at UMBC	W 78–68	2–3	Chesapeake Employers Insurance Arena (1,743); Catonsville, MD
November 24, 2024*; 11:00 am, FloHoops		vs. Boise State; Cayman Islands Classic Quarterfinals	L 69–83	2–4	John Gray Gymnasium (919); George Town, Cayman Islands
November 25, 2024*; 11:00 am, FloHoops		vs. Duquesne; Cayman Islands Classic consolation game	W 64–59	3–4	John Gray Gymnasium (905); George Town, Cayman Islands
November 26, 2024*; 1:30 pm, FloHoops		vs. High Point; Cayman Islands Classic 5th place game	L 73–76	3–5	John Gray Gymnasium (925); George Town, Cayman Islands
December 3, 2024; 7:00 pm, FloHoops		North Carolina A&T	W 82–71	4–5 (1–0)	Hampton Convocation Center (1,778); Hampton, VA
December 10, 2024*; 7:00 pm, FloHoops		Apprentice School	W 86–68	5–5	Hampton Convocation Center (375); Hampton, VA
December 18, 2024*; 7:00 pm, FloHoops		Regent	W 108–65	6–5	Hampton Convocation Center (367); Hampton, VA
December 21, 2024*; 1:00 pm, ESPN+		at Loyola (MD)	W 76–68	7–5	Reitz Arena (524); Baltimore, MD
December 28, 2024*; 4:00 pm, CBS/Paramount+		Howard; CBS Sports Classic: HBCU Showcase	W 83–67	8–5	Hampton Convocation Center (4,213); Hampton, VA
January 2, 2025; 7:00 pm, FloHoops		at Charleston	L 67–94	8–6 (1–1)	TD Arena (5,070); Charleston, SC
January 4, 2025; 7:00 pm, FloHoops		at Elon	L 62–70	8–7 (1–2)	Schar Center (2,465); Elon, NC
January 9, 2025; 7:00 pm, FloHoops		Campbell	L 55–66	8–8 (1–3)	Hampton Convocation Center (1,257); Hampton, VA
January 11, 2025; 2:00 pm, FloHoops		Delaware	W 83–77	9–8 (2–3)	Hampton Convocation Center (527); Hampton, VA
January 16, 2025; 4:00 pm, FloHoops		William & Mary	L 64–67	9–9 (2–4)	Hampton Convocation Center (1,654); Hampton, VA
January 20, 2025; 9:00 pm, CBSSN		at North Carolina A&T	W 74–73	10–9 (3–4)	Corbett Sports Center (4,218); Greensboro, NC
January 23, 2025; 5:00 pm, CBSSN		at William & Mary	L 83–94	10–10 (3–5)	Kaplan Arena (3,019); Williamsburg, VA
January 25, 2025; 7:00 pm, FloHoops		at UNC Wilmington	L 62–83	10–11 (3–6)	Trask Coliseum (5,200); Wilmington, NC
January 30, 2025; 7:00 pm, FloHoops		Northeastern	L 69–78	10–12 (3–7)	Hampton Convocation Center (757); Hampton, VA
February 1, 2025*; 3:00 pm		vs. Howard	W 80–79 ^{OT}	11–12	Entertainment and Sports Arena (2,100); Washington, D.C.
February 6, 2025; 7:00 pm, FloHoops		at Monmouth	L 63–68	11–13 (3–8)	OceanFirst Bank Center (1,929); West Long Branch, NJ
February 8, 2025; 4:00 pm, FloHoops		at Northeastern	W 84–75	12–13 (4–8)	Matthews Arena (1,150); Boston, MA
February 13, 2025; 7:00 pm, FloHoops		Drexel	W 63–58	13–13 (5–8)	Hampton Convocation Center (408); Hampton, VA
February 15, 2025; 2:00 pm, FloHoops		Hofstra	W 67–49	14–13 (6–8)	Hampton Convocation Center (2,203); Hampton, VA
February 22, 2025; 2:00 pm, CBSSN		UNC Wilmington	W 83–70	15–13 (7–8)	Hampton Convocation Center (3,416); Hampton, VA
February 24, 2025; 12:00 pm, FloHoops		Stony Brook	W 81–49	16–13 (8–8)	Hampton Convocation Center (478); Hampton, VA
February 27, 2025; 7:00 pm, FloHoops		at Drexel	L 52–53	16–14 (8–9)	Daskalakis Athletic Center (1,357); Philadelphia, PA
March 1, 2025; 4:00 pm, FloHoops		at Towson	L 72–75	16–15 (8–10)	TU Arena (4,705); Towson, MD
CAA tournament
March 8, 2025; 6:00 pm, FloHoops	(10)	vs. (7) Northeastern; Second round	W 70–65	17–15	CareFirst Arena; Washington, D.C.
March 9, 2025; 6:00 pm, FloHoops	(10)	vs. (2) UNC Wilmington; Quarterfinals	L 65–79	17–16	CareFirst Arena; Washington, D.C.
*Non-conference game. ^{#}Rankings from AP Poll. (#) Tournament seedings in parentheses. All times are in Eastern.
