= 2024–25 Hofstra Pride men's basketball team =

American college basketball season

2024–25 Hofstra Pride men's basketball
- Conference: Coastal Athletic Association
- Record: 15–18 (6–12 CAA)
- Head coach: Speedy Claxton (4th season)
- Assistant coaches: Mike DePaoli; Tom Parrotta; Colin Curtin; Antwon Portley
- Home arena: Mack Sports Complex

2024–25 CAA men's basketball standings
	Conf.				Overall
Team	W		L	PCT	W		L	PCT
Towson	16	–	2	.889	22	–	11	.667
UNC Wilmington †	14	–	4	.778	27	–	8	.771
Charleston	13	–	5	.722	24	–	9	.727
William & Mary	11	–	7	.611	17	–	15	.531
Campbell	10	–	8	.556	15	–	17	.469
Monmouth	10	–	8	.556	13	–	20	.394
Northeastern	9	–	9	.500	17	–	15	.531
Drexel	9	–	9	.500	18	–	15	.545
Elon	8	–	10	.444	17	–	16	.515
Hampton	8	–	10	.444	17	–	16	.515
Hofstra	6	–	12	.333	15	–	18	.455
Delaware	5	–	13	.278	16	–	20	.444
Stony Brook	4	–	14	.222	8	–	24	.250
North Carolina A&T	3	–	15	.167	7	–	25	.219
† 2025 CAA tournament winner

The 2024–25 Hofstra Pride men's basketball team represented Hofstra University during the 2024–25 NCAA Division I men's basketball season. The Pride, led by fourth-year head coach Speedy Claxton, played their home games at the Mack Sports Complex in Hempstead, New York, as members of the Coastal Athletic Association.

== Previous season ==
The Pride finished the 2023–24 season 20–13, 12–6 in CAA play to finish in a tie for third place. They defeated Delaware, before being upset by Stony Brook in the semifinals of the CAA tournament.

== Roster ==
2024–25 Hofstra Pride men's basketball team
Players
Coaches

Pos.	#	Name	Height	Weight	Year	Previous school	Hometown
G	0	KiJan Robinson	6 ft 3 in (1.91 m)	175 lb (79 kg)	So	Wekiva HS	Apopka, Florida
G	1	TJ Gadsden	6 ft 7 in (2.01 m)	205 lb (93 kg)	Sr	Canisius	New York, New York
G	2	Jaquan Sanders	6 ft 4 in (1.93 m)	215 lb (98 kg)	Jr	Seton Hall	Far Rockaway, New York
G	3	Khalil Farmer	6 ft 3 in (1.91 m)	190 lb (86 kg)	RS So	Roman Catholic HS	Philadelphia, Pennsylvania
F	4	Joshua DeCady	6 ft 8 in (2.03 m)	220 lb (100 kg)	Fr	Kimball Union Academy	Queens Village, New York
G	5	Cruz Davis	6 ft 3 in (1.91 m)	170 lb (77 kg)	So	St. John's	Plano, Texas
G	7	Jean Aranguren	6 ft 3 in (1.91 m)	190 lb (86 kg)	So	Iona	Valencia, Venezuela
G	8	Carlos Lopez	6 ft 1 in (1.85 m)	180 lb (82 kg)	So	Saint Francis (PA)	Atlantic City, New Jersey
G	11	Amir Williams	6 ft 4 in (1.93 m)	195 lb (88 kg)	Fr	Neumann Goretti HS	Newark, Delaware
F	12	Michael Graham	6 ft 8 in (2.03 m)	229 lb (104 kg)	GS	Loyola Marymount	Brooklyn, New York
G	15	Jayden Henriquez	6 ft 0 in (1.83 m)	186 lb (84 kg)	So	East Meadow HS	East Meadow, New York
G	24	Eric Parnell	6 ft 3 in (1.91 m)	175 lb (79 kg)	RS So	Eastern Florida State	Melbourne, Florida
G	25	German Plotnikov	6 ft 5 in (1.96 m)	200 lb (91 kg)	Sr	North Platte CC	Minsk, Belarus
F	30	Miguel Mantilla Pacchiano	6 ft 6 in (1.98 m)	220 lb (100 kg)	Jr	Lake Travis HS	Austin, Texas
F	33	Silas Sunday	7 ft 0 in (2.13 m)	282 lb (128 kg)	Jr	Iona	Lucan, Ireland

Head coach

- Speedy Claxton (Hofstra)

Assistant coach(es)

- Mike DePaoli (Saint Rose)
- Tom Parrotta (Fordham)
- Colin Curtin (Niagara)
- Antwon Portley (Fordham)

Legend

- (C) Team captain
- (S) Suspended
- (I) Ineligible
- (W) Walk-on
- Injured
- Current redshirt

Roster
Last update: January 26, 2025

== Schedule and results ==
Date time, TV	Rank^{#}	Opponent^{#}	Result	Record	Site (attendance) city, state
Non-conference regular season
November 4, 2024*; 5:00 pm, FloHoops		SUNY Old Westbury	W 89–62	1–0	Mack Sports Complex (1,543); Hempstead, NY
November 8, 2024*; 7:00 pm, FloHoops/MSGSN		Iona	W 90–76	2–0	Mack Sports Complex (3,347); Hempstead, NY
November 13, 2024*; 8:00 pm, MSGSN		vs. Seton Hall; Icons of the Game	W 49–48	3–0	Nassau Coliseum (1,400); Uniondale, NY
November 16, 2024*; 7:00 pm, ESPN+		at UMass	W 75–71 ^{OT}	4–0	Mullins Center (3,155); Amherst, MA
November 19, 2024*; 7:00 pm, ACCNX/ESPN+		at Florida State	L 61–79	4–1	Donald L. Tucker Center (3,253); Tallahassee, FL
November 22, 2024*; 7:00 pm, ESPN+		at No. 7 Houston	L 44–80	4–2	Fertitta Center (7,035); Houston, TX
November 29, 2024*; 7:30 pm, FloHoops		vs. Rice; Nassau Championship	W 68–63 ^{OT}	5–2	Baha Mar Convention Center (321); Nassau, Bahamas
November 30, 2024*; 4:30 pm, FloHoops		vs. Tarleton State; Nassau Championship	L 59–61	5–3	Baha Mar Convention Center (362); Nassau, Bahamas
December 1, 2024*; 4:30 pm, FloHoops		vs. Arkansas State; Nassau Championship	W 68–66	6–3	Baha Mar Convention Center (376); Nassau, Bahamas
December 6, 2024*; 11:30 am, FloHoops		St. Joseph's–Long Island	W 114–46	7–3	Mack Sports Complex (4,013); Hempstead, NY
December 9, 2024*; 7:00 pm		at Norfolk State	W 80–67	8–3	Joseph G. Echols Memorial Hall (1,562); Norfolk, VA
December 15, 2024*; 12:00 pm, FloHoops/MSG		Temple	L 42–60	8–4	Mack Sports Complex (2,274); Hempstead, NY
December 29, 2024*; 1:00 pm, ESPN+		at Quinnipiac	L 69–75 ^{OT}	8–5	M&T Bank Arena (1,504); Hamden, CT
CAA regular season
January 2, 2025; 7:00 pm, FloHoops/MSG2		William & Mary	L 56–74	8–6 (0–1)	Mack Sports Complex (1,992); Hempstead, NY
January 4, 2025; 12:00 pm, FloHoops		at Northeastern	W 55–37	9–6 (1–1)	Matthews Arena (872); Boston, MA
January 9, 2025; 7:00 pm, FloHoops/MSG2		Charleston	L 61–67	9–7 (1–2)	Mack Sports Complex (1,504); Hempstead, NY
January 11, 2025; 1:00 pm, FloHoops/MSG		UNC Wilmington	W 66–63	10–7 (2–2)	Mack Sports Complex (1,738); Hempstead, NY
January 16, 2025; 7:00 pm, CBSSN		at Towson	L 60–65	10–8 (2–3)	TU Arena (2,016); Towson, MD
January 20, 2025; 3:00 pm, CBSSN		at Drexel	L 55–60	10–9 (2–4)	Daskalakis Athletic Center (1,136); Philadelphia, PA
January 23, 2025; 7:00 pm, FloHoops/MSGSN		Delaware	W 93–68	11–9 (3–4)	Mack Sports Complex (1,502); Hempstead, NY
January 25, 2025; 12:00 pm, CBSSN		Campbell	L 67–69 ^{OT}	11–10 (3–5)	Mack Sports Complex (1,565); Hempstead, NY
January 30, 2025; 7:00 pm, FloHoops		at Elon	W 74–63	12–10 (4–5)	Schar Center; Elon, NC
February 1, 2025; 1:00 pm, FloHoops		at Campbell	L 52–75	12–11 (4–6)	Gore Arena (1,223); Buies Creek, NC
February 6, 2025; 7:00 pm, FloHoops/MSG		Northeastern	L 68–77	12–12 (4–7)	Mack Sports Complex (1,224); Hempstead, NY
February 8, 2025; 4:00 pm, FloHoops/MSG		Stony Brook; Battle of Long Island	L 75–80	12–13 (4–8)	Mack Sports Complex (3,819); Hempstead, NY
February 13, 2025; 7:00 pm, FloHoops		at William & Mary	L 60–61	12–14 (4–9)	Kaplan Arena (2,855); Williamsburg, VA
February 15, 2025; 2:00 pm, FloHoops		at Hampton	L 49–67	12–15 (4–10)	Hampton Convocation Center (2,203); Hampton, VA
February 20, 2025; 7:00 pm, CBSSN		Monmouth	L 62–68	12–16 (4–11)	Mack Sports Complex (1,460); Hempstead, NY
February 22, 2025; 4:00 pm, FloHoops		at Delaware	W 78–65	13–16 (5–11)	Bob Carpenter Center (2,281); Newark, DE
February 27, 2025; 7:00 pm, FloHoops		at Stony Brook; Battle of Long Island	L 56–59	13–17 (5–12)	Stony Brook Arena (2,286); Stony Brook, NY
March 1, 2025; 2:00 pm, FloHoops/MSG		North Carolina A&T	W 70–49	14–17 (6–12)	Mack Sports Complex (1,982); Hempstead, NY
CAA tournament
March 7, 2025; 4:30 pm, FloHoops	(11)	vs. (14) North Carolina A&T; First round	W 77–55	15–17	CareFirst Arena (2,245); Washington, D.C.
March 8, 2025; 8:30 pm, FloHoops	(11)	vs. (6) Monmouth; Second round	L 60–65	15–18	CareFirst Arena (2,556); Washington, D.C.
*Non-conference game. ^{#}Rankings from AP Poll. (#) Tournament seedings in parentheses. All times are in Eastern.
