= 2024–25 North Carolina A&T Aggies men's basketball team =

American college basketball season

2024–25 North Carolina A&T Aggies men's basketball
- Conference: Coastal Athletic Association
- Record: 7–25 (3–15 CAA)
- Head coach: Monté Ross (2nd season)
- Associate head coach: Jeff Rafferty
- Assistant coaches: Dorian Long; Ricky Moore; Patrick Herron; Colin Daly
- Home arena: Corbett Sports Center

2024–25 CAA men's basketball standings
	Conf.				Overall
Team	W		L	PCT	W		L	PCT
Towson	16	–	2	.889	22	–	11	.667
UNC Wilmington †	14	–	4	.778	27	–	8	.771
Charleston	13	–	5	.722	24	–	9	.727
William & Mary	11	–	7	.611	17	–	15	.531
Campbell	10	–	8	.556	15	–	17	.469
Monmouth	10	–	8	.556	13	–	20	.394
Northeastern	9	–	9	.500	17	–	15	.531
Drexel	9	–	9	.500	18	–	15	.545
Elon	8	–	10	.444	17	–	16	.515
Hampton	8	–	10	.444	17	–	16	.515
Hofstra	6	–	12	.333	15	–	18	.455
Delaware	5	–	13	.278	16	–	20	.444
Stony Brook	4	–	14	.222	8	–	24	.250
North Carolina A&T	3	–	15	.167	7	–	25	.219
† 2025 CAA tournament winner

The 2024–25 North Carolina A&T Aggies men's basketball team represented North Carolina A&T State University during the 2024–25 NCAA Division I men's basketball season. The Aggies, led by second-year head coach Monté Ross, played their home games at the Corbett Sports Center in Greensboro, North Carolina as members of the Coastal Athletic Association (CAA).

== Previous season ==
The Aggies finished the 2023–24 season 7–25, 5–13 in CAA play, to finish in 12th place. They were defeated by William & Mary in the first round of the CAA tournament.

== Roster ==
2024–25 North Carolina A&T Aggies men's basketball team
Players
Coaches

Pos.	#	Name	Height	Weight	Year	Hometown
G	0	Kyle Duke	6 ft 4 in (1.93 m)	185 lb (84 kg)	Sr	Mississauga, ON
G	1	Ryan Forrest	6 ft 4 in (1.93 m)	190 lb (86 kg)	So	Marion, AR
G	2	Qua Brown	6 ft 3 in (1.91 m)	200 lb (91 kg)	RS Fr	Covington, GA
G	3	Camian Shell	5 ft 10 in (1.78 m)	170 lb (77 kg)	Jr	Winston-Salem, NC
G	4	Bryson Ogletree	6 ft 4 in (1.93 m)	190 lb (86 kg)	So	Hampton, GA
G	5	Jahnathan Lamothe	6 ft 4 in (1.93 m)	192 lb (87 kg)	So	Baltimore, MD
G	7	Landon Glasper	6 ft 2 in (1.88 m)	170 lb (77 kg)	Jr	Fayetteville, AR
G	10	Uchenna Kellman-Nicholes	6 ft 5 in (1.96 m)	180 lb (82 kg)	So	Orlando, FL
G	11	Jordan Martin	6 ft 1 in (1.85 m)	190 lb (86 kg)	Jr	Columbia, SC
C	13	Jason Murphy	6 ft 9 in (2.06 m)	245 lb (111 kg)	Sr	Owings Mills, MD
G	15	Jalal McKie	6 ft 4 in (1.93 m)	195 lb (88 kg)	So	Atlanta, GA
F	16	Nikolaos Chitikoudis	6 ft 9 in (2.06 m)	215 lb (98 kg)	So	East Thessaloniki, Greece
G	20	Chanler Montgomery	6 ft 3 in (1.91 m)	172 lb (78 kg)	Fr	Blacksburg, VA
C	31	Efstratios Kalliontzis	6 ft 11 in (2.11 m)	225 lb (102 kg)	RS Fr	Mitilini, Greece
G	33	Julius Reese	6 ft 1 in (1.85 m)	180 lb (82 kg)	So	Kernersville, NC
C	34	Will Felton	6 ft 9 in (2.06 m)	260 lb (118 kg)	RS So	Raleigh, NC

Head coach

- Monté Ross (Winston-Salem State)

Assistant coach(es)

- Jeff Rafferty (Springfield)
- Dorian Long (Neumann)
- Ricky Moore (Connecticut)
- Patrick Herron (Winston-Salem State)
- Colin Daly (Temple)

Legend

- (C) Team captain
- (S) Suspended
- (I) Ineligible
- (W) Walk-on
- Injured
- Current redshirt

Roster
Last update: November 2, 2024

== Schedule and results ==
Date time, TV	Rank^{#}	Opponent^{#}	Result	Record	Site (attendance) city, state
Regular season
November 4, 2024*; 7:00 p.m., FloHoops		Cheyney	W 107–55	1–0	Corbett Sports Center (2,911); Greensboro, NC
November 7, 2024*; 7:00 p.m., ACCNX/ESPN+		at Wake Forest	L 64–80	1–1	LJVM Coliseum (8,829); Winston-Salem, NC
November 12, 2024*; 7:00 p.m., ESPN+		at George Washington	L 80–85	1–2	Charles E. Smith Center (1,598); Washington, D.C.
November 17, 2024*; 2:00 p.m., ESPN+		at The Citadel	W 82–73	2–2	McAlister Field House (913); Charleston, SC
November 20, 2024*; 7:00 p.m., FloHoops		Morgan State	W 86–83	3–2	Corbett Sports Center (2,459); Greensboro, NC
November 25, 2024*; 7:00 p.m., ESPN+		at Buffalo	L 81–82	3–3	Alumni Arena (1,181); Amherst, NY
November 29, 2024*; 5:30 p.m., ESPN+		at East Carolina	L 69–93	3–4	Williams Arena (4,260); Greenville, NC
December 3, 2024; 7:00 p.m., FloHoops		at Hampton	L 71–82	3–5 (0–1)	Hampton Convocation Center (1,778); Hampton, VA
December 7, 2024*; 2:00 p.m., FloHoops		UNC Greensboro; Battle of Market Street	L 55–67	3–6	Corbett Sports Center (2,365); Greensboro, NC
December 12, 2024*; 7:00 p.m., ACCNX		at Virginia Tech	L 67–95	3–7	Cassell Coliseum (4,856); Blacksburg, VA
December 14, 2024*; 7:00 p.m., ESPN+		at Liberty	L 74–83	3–8	Liberty Arena (2,685); Lynchburg, VA
December 17, 2024*; FloHoops		Coastal Carolina	L 68–73	3–9	Corbett Sports Center (923); Greensboro, NC
December 21, 2024*; 2:30 p.m., SECN		at Arkansas	L 67–95	3–10	Bud Walton Arena (19,200); Fayetteville, AR
December 28, 2024*; 2:00 p.m., CBS		North Carolina Central; CBS Sports Classic: HBCU Showcase/Rivalry	W 85–72	4–10	Corbett Sports Center (4,011); Greensboro, NC
January 2, 2025; 7:00 p.m., FloHoops		Elon	L 67–75	4–11 (0–2)	Corbett Sports Center (1,092); Greensboro, NC
January 4, 2025; 2:00 p.m., FloHoops		Drexel	L 59–68	4–12 (0–3)	Corbett Sports Center (714); Greensboro, NC
January 9, 2025; 7:00 p.m., FloHoops		Delaware	L 88–98	4–13 (0–4)	Corbett Sports Center (708); Greensboro, NC
January 11, 2025; 2:00 p.m., FloHoops		at William & Mary	L 78–81	4–14 (0–5)	Kaplan Arena (2,641); Williamsburg, VA
January 16, 2025; 7:00 p.m., FloHoops		Monmouth	L 63–72	4–15 (0–6)	Corbett Sports Center (2,858); Greensboro, NC
January 20, 2025; 9:00 p.m., CBSSN		Hampton	L 73–74	4–16 (0–7)	Corbett Sports Center (4,218); Greensboro, NC
January 23, 2025; 7:00 p.m., FloHoops		at Towson	L 67–83	4–17 (0–8)	TU Arena (1,857); Towson, MD
January 25, 2025; 12:00 p.m., FloHoops		at Stony Brook	L 74–89	4–18 (0–9)	Stony Brook Arena (2,804); Stony Brook, NY
January 30, 2025; 7:00 p.m., FloHoops		UNC Wilmington	L 59–83	4–19 (0–10)	Corbett Sports Center (1,658); Greensboro, NC
February 6, 2025; 6:00 p.m., CBSSN		at Charleston	L 63–66	4–20 (0–11)	TD Arena (4,600); Charleston, SC
February 10, 2025; 8:00 p.m., FloHoops		at Campbell	L 62–66	4–21 (0–12)	Gore Arena (2,232); Buies Creek, NC
February 13, 2025; 7:00 p.m., FloHoops		at Elon	W 60–59	5–21 (1–12)	Schar Center (1,857); Elon, NC
February 15, 2025; 2:00 p.m., FloHoops		Charleston	L 59–69	5–22 (1–13)	Corbett Sports Center (1,201); Greensboro, NC
February 20, 2025; 7:00 p.m., FloHoops		Campbell	W 53–50	6–22 (2–13)	Corbett Sports Center (1,259); Greensboro, NC
February 22, 2025; 2:00 p.m., FloHoops		Stony Brook	W 73–72	7–22 (3–13)	Corbett Sports Center (1,203); Greensboro, NC
February 27, 2025; 7:00 p.m., FloHoops		at Northeastern	L 55–69	7–23 (3–14)	Matthews Arena (1,164); Boston, MA
March 1, 2025; 4:00 p.m., FloHoops		at Hofstra	L 49–70	7–24 (3–15)	Mack Sports Complex (1,982); Hempstead, NY
CAA tournament
March 7, 2025; 4:30 p.m., FloHoops	(14)	vs. (11) Hofstra; First round	L 55–77	7–25	CareFirst Arena (2,245); Washington, D.C.
*Non-conference game. ^{#}Rankings from AP poll. (#) Tournament seedings in parentheses. All times are in Eastern.
