= 2025 CAA men's basketball tournament =

U.S. collegiate basketball event

- Classification: Division I
- Season: 2024–25
- Teams: 14
- Site: CareFirst Arena; Washington, D.C.
- Champions: UNC Wilmington (7th title)
- Winning coach: Takayo Siddle (1st title)
- MVP: Donovan Newby (UNC Wilmington)
- Television: FloHoops, CBSSN

2024–25 CAA men's basketball standings
	Conf.				Overall
Team	W		L	PCT	W		L	PCT
Towson	16	–	2	.889	22	–	11	.667
UNC Wilmington †	14	–	4	.778	27	–	8	.771
Charleston	13	–	5	.722	24	–	9	.727
William & Mary	11	–	7	.611	17	–	15	.531
Campbell	10	–	8	.556	15	–	17	.469
Monmouth	10	–	8	.556	13	–	20	.394
Northeastern	9	–	9	.500	17	–	15	.531
Drexel	9	–	9	.500	18	–	15	.545
Elon	8	–	10	.444	17	–	16	.515
Hampton	8	–	10	.444	17	–	16	.515
Hofstra	6	–	12	.333	15	–	18	.455
Delaware	5	–	13	.278	16	–	20	.444
Stony Brook	4	–	14	.222	8	–	24	.250
North Carolina A&T	3	–	15	.167	7	–	25	.219
† 2025 CAA tournament winner

The 2025 Coastal Athletic Association men's basketball tournament was the postseason men's college basketball tournament for the Coastal Athletic Association for the 2024–25 NCAA Division I men's basketball season. The tournament was held March 7–11, 2025, at the CareFirst Arena in Washington, D.C. The winner, UNC Wilmington, received the conference's automatic bid to the 2025 NCAA tournament.

== Seeds ==
All 14 CAA teams participated in the tournament. Teams were seeded by record within the conference, with a tiebreaker system to seed teams with identical conference records. The top 10 teams received a first round bye and the top four teams received a double bye, automatically advancing them into the quarterfinals.

Seed	School	Conf.	Tiebreaker
1	Towson	16–2	
2	UNC Wilmington	14–4	
3	Charleston	13–5	
4	William & Mary	11–7	
5	Campbell	10–8	1–0 vs. Monmouth
6	Monmouth	10–8	0–1 vs. Campbell
7	Northeastern	9–9	1–0 vs. Drexel
8	Drexel	9–9	0–1 vs. Northeastern
9	Elon	8–10	1–0 vs. Hampton
10	Hampton	8–10	0–1 vs. Elon
11	Hofstra	6–12	
12	Delaware	5–13	
13	Stony Brook	4–14	
14	North Carolina A&T	3–15	

== Schedule ==
Session	Game	Time*	Matchup	Score	Television
First Round – Friday, March 7
1	1	2:00 pm	No. 12 Delaware vs. No. 13 Stony Brook	80–76	FloHoops
1	2	4:30 pm	No. 11 Hofstra vs. No. 14 North Carolina A&T	77–55	FloHoops
Second Round – Saturday, March 8
2	3	12:00 pm	No. 8 Drexel vs. No. 9 Elon	91–74	FloHoops
2	4	2:30 pm	No. 5 Campbell vs. No. 12 Delaware	62–79	FloHoops
3	5	6:00 pm	No. 7 Northeastern vs. No. 10 Hampton	65–70	FloHoops
3	6	8:30 pm	No. 6 Monmouth vs. No. 11 Hofstra	65–60	FloHoops
Quarterfinals – Sunday, March 9
4	7	12:00 pm	No. 1 Towson vs. No. 8 Drexel	82–76	FloHoops
4	8	2:30 pm	No. 4 William & Mary vs. No. 12 Delaware	78–100	FloHoops
5	9	6:00 pm	No. 2 UNC Wilmington vs. No. 10 Hampton	79–65	FloHoops
5	10	8:30 pm	No. 3 Charleston vs. No. 6 Monmouth	79–78^{OT}	FloHoops
Semifinals – Monday, March 10
6	11	6:00 pm	No. 1 Towson vs. No. 12 Delaware	72–82	CBSSN
6	12	8:30 pm	No. 2 UNC Wilmington vs. No. 3 Charleston	68–67	CBSSN
Championship – Tuesday, March 11
7	13	7:00 pm	No. 2 UNC Wilmington vs. No. 12 Delaware	76–72	CBSSN
*Game times in EST for the first and second rounds and EDT from the quarterfinals onward. Rankings denote tournament seed.

== Bracket ==
First Round; Friday, March 7 FloHoops
12	Delaware	80
13	Stony Brook	76
11	Hofstra	77
14	North Carolina A&T	55

Second Round; Saturday, March 8 FloHoops
8	Drexel	91
9	Elon	74
5	Campbell	62
12	Delaware	79
7	Northeastern	65
10	Hampton	70
6	Monmouth	65
11	Hofstra	60

Quarterfinals; Sunday, March 9 FloHoops
1	Towson	82
8	Drexel	76
4	William & Mary	78
12	Delaware	100
2	UNC Wilmington	79
10	Hampton	65
3	Charleston	79^{OT}
6	Monmouth	78

Semifinals; Monday, March 10; CBS Sports Network
1	Towson	72
12	Delaware	82
2	UNC Wilmington	68
3	Charleston	67

Championship; Tuesday, March 11; CBS Sports Network
12	Delaware	72
2	UNC Wilmington	76

== Honors ==
CAA All-Tournament Team	Player	School
CAA All-Tournament Team	Donovan Newby (MVP)	UNC Wilmington
CAA All-Tournament Team	Khamari McGriff	UNC Wilmington
CAA All-Tournament Team	Noah Ross	UNC Wilmington
CAA All-Tournament Team	John Camden	Delaware
CAA All-Tournament Team	Niels Lane	Delaware
CAA All-Tournament Team	Izaiah Pasha	Delaware

== See also ==
- 2025 CAA women's basketball tournament
