= 2024–25 Elon Phoenix men's basketball team =

American college basketball season

2024–25 Elon Phoenix men's basketball

CBI, first round
- Conference: Coastal Athletic Association
- Record: 17–16 (8–10 CAA)
- Head coach: Billy Taylor (3rd season)
- Assistant coaches: Greg Herenda; Ryan Saunders; Darius Stokes
- Home arena: Schar Center

2024–25 CAA men's basketball standings
	Conf.				Overall
Team	W		L	PCT	W		L	PCT
Towson	16	–	2	.889	22	–	11	.667
UNC Wilmington †	14	–	4	.778	27	–	8	.771
Charleston	13	–	5	.722	24	–	9	.727
William & Mary	11	–	7	.611	17	–	15	.531
Campbell	10	–	8	.556	15	–	17	.469
Monmouth	10	–	8	.556	13	–	20	.394
Northeastern	9	–	9	.500	17	–	15	.531
Drexel	9	–	9	.500	18	–	15	.545
Elon	8	–	10	.444	17	–	16	.515
Hampton	8	–	10	.444	17	–	16	.515
Hofstra	6	–	12	.333	15	–	18	.455
Delaware	5	–	13	.278	16	–	20	.444
Stony Brook	4	–	14	.222	8	–	24	.250
North Carolina A&T	3	–	15	.167	7	–	25	.219
† 2025 CAA tournament winner

The 2024–25 Elon Phoenix men's basketball team represented Elon University during the 2024–25 NCAA Division I men's basketball season. The Phoenix, led by third-year head coach Billy Taylor, played their home games at the Schar Center in Elon, North Carolina as members of the Coastal Athletic Association (CAA).

The Phoenix finished the season 17–16, 8–10 in CAA play, to finish in a tie for ninth place. They were defeated by Drexel in the second round of the CAA tournament. The Phoenix were eliminated by Army in the first round of the CBI.

== Previous season ==
The Phoenix finished the 2023–24 season 13–19, 6–12 in CAA play, to finish in eleventh place. They were defeated by Hampton in the first round of the CAA tournament.

== Roster ==
2024–25 Elon Phoenix men's basketball team
Players
Coaches

Pos.	#	Name	Height	Weight	Year	Previous school	Hometown
G	0	Nick Dorn	6 ft 7 in (2.01 m)	200 lb (91 kg)	So	Julius L. Chambers High School	Charlotte, NC
F	1	Kendall Campbell	6 ft 8 in (2.03 m)	243 lb (110 kg)	So	Combine Academy	Atlanta, GA
G	2	TJ Simpkins	6 ft 5 in (1.96 m)	185 lb (84 kg)	So	Northwest Florida State College	Brooklyn, NY
G	3	TK Simpkins	6 ft 4 in (1.93 m)	184 lb (83 kg)	Jr	Northwest Florida State College	Brooklyn, NY
F	4	Sam Sherry	6 ft 11 in (2.11 m)	240 lb (109 kg)	Sr	Cumberland Valley High School	Mechanicsburg, PA
G	5	Savion Taylor	6 ft 4 in (1.93 m)	210 lb (95 kg)	RS Fr	The Burlington School	Burlington, NC
G	6	Ned Hull	6 ft 3 in (1.91 m)	180 lb (82 kg)	So	Charlotte Latin School	Charlotte, NC
G	8	Trey O'Neil	6 ft 1 in (1.85 m)	180 lb (82 kg)	Fr	IMG Academy	Ardmore, PA
G	10	Andrew King	6 ft 3 in (1.91 m)	189 lb (86 kg)	RS So	UIC	Phoenix, AZ
G	11	Austin Williams	6 ft 1 in (1.85 m)	175 lb (79 kg)	Jr	Trinity-Pawling School	Laurel, MD
F	12	Isaac Harrell	6 ft 8 in (2.03 m)	195 lb (88 kg)	So	Jonesboro High School	Jonesboro, AR
G	13	Jameel Rideout	6 ft 2 in (1.88 m)	185 lb (84 kg)	Jr	USC Aiken	Philadelphia, PA
F	14	Brayden Crump	6 ft 8 in (2.03 m)	220 lb (100 kg)	RS Fr	Winston-Salem Christian School	Morganton, NC
F	22	Matthew Van Komen	7 ft 4 in (2.24 m)	260 lb (118 kg)	GS	Hawaii Pacific	Lehi, UT
F	23	Otto Luessenhop	6 ft 8 in (2.03 m)	190 lb (86 kg)	Jr	Northfield Mount Hermon School	Amagansett, NY
F	55	Deandre Smart	6 ft 6 in (1.98 m)	230 lb (104 kg)	Jr	Loomis Chaffee School	Savannah, GA

Head coach

- Billy Taylor (Notre Dame)

Assistant coach(es)

- Greg Herenda (Merrimack)
- Ryan Saunders (Barry)
- Darius Stokes (Iowa)

Legend

- (C) Team captain
- (S) Suspended
- (I) Ineligible
- (W) Walk-on
- Injured
- Current redshirt

Roster
Last update: November 1, 2024

== Schedule and results ==
Date time, TV	Rank^{#}	Opponent^{#}	Result	Record	High points	High rebounds	High assists	Site (attendance) city, state
Non-conference regular season
November 4, 2024*; 9:00 p.m., ACCN		at No. 9 North Carolina	L 76–90	0–1	17 – Dorn	8 – Sherry	4 – King	Dean Smith Center (17,242); Chapel Hill, NC
November 9, 2024*; 8:00 p.m., FloHoops		Bluefield	W 103–66	1–1	21 – TJ Simpkins	8 – Van Komen	4 – King	Schar Center (1,125); Elon, NC
November 16, 2024*; 7:00 p.m., ESPN+		at Gardner–Webb	L 79–80	1–2	17 – 2 tied	6 – Dorn	5 – King	Paul Porter Arena (350); Boiling Springs, NC
November 20, 2024*; 7:00 p.m., ESPN+		at Northern Illinois	W 75–48	2–2	19 – TK Simpkins	10 – 2 tied	6 – King	Convocation Center (1,081); DeKalb, IL
November 22, 2024*; 7:30 p.m., ACCNX		at Notre Dame	W 84–77	3–2	24 – Dorn	7 – Sherry	6 – TK Simpkins	Joyce Center (4,475); South Bend, IN
November 29, 2024*; 2:00 p.m., ESPN+		vs. Maine; Cathedral Classic Invitational	L 56–69	3–3	21 – TK Simpkins	8 – Sherry	5 – TJ Simpkins	The Palestra; Philadelphia, PA
November 30, 2024*; 2:00 p.m., ESPN+		vs. Navy; Cathedral Classic Invitational	W 69–63	4–3	21 – Dorn	12 – Van Komen	4 – King	The Palestra; Philadelphia, PA
December 1, 2024*; 2:30 p.m., ESPN+		at Penn; Cathedral Classic Invitational	W 68–53	5–3	16 – Sherry	14 – Van Komen	5 – TK Simpkins	The Palestra (597); Philadelphia, PA
December 7, 2024*; 7:00 p.m., FloHoops		Wofford	W 79–56	6–3	22 – Sherry	12 – Van Komen	7 – TJ Simpkins	Schar Center (2,167); Elon, NC
December 14, 2024*; 7:00 p.m., FloHoops		Virginia Lynchburg	W 114–52	7–3	16 – TJ Simpkins	9 – 2 tied	5 – King	Schar Center (1,145); Elon, NC
December 18, 2024*; 7:00 p.m., ESPN+		at East Tennessee State	L 58–84	7–4	27 – TJ Simpkins	9 – Crump	3 – TJ Simpkins	Freedom Hall Civic Center (3,177); Johnson City, TN
December 21, 2024*; 7:00 p.m., FloHoops		UNC Greensboro	W 73–69	8–4	28 – Sherry	14 – Sherry	4 – TJ Simpkins	Schar Center (1,828); Elon, NC
December 28, 2024*; 7:00 p.m., FloHoops		Marshall	W 73–59	9–4	29 – Dorn	14 – Van Komen	5 – TJ Simpkins	Schar Center (1,956); Elon, NC
CAA regular season
January 2, 2025; 7:00 p.m., FloHoops		at North Carolina A&T	W 75–67	10–4 (1–0)	19 – TJ Simpkins	10 – Van Komen	3 – 3 tied	Corbett Sports Center (1,092); Greensboro, NC
January 4, 2025; 7:00 p.m., FloHoops		Hampton	W 70–62	11–4 (2–0)	24 – Dorn	12 – Sherry	3 – King	Schar Center (2,465); Elon, NC
January 9, 2025; 7:00 p.m., CBSSN		at William & Mary	L 65–78	11–5 (2–1)	14 – Sherry	11 – Sherry	4 – TJ Simpkins	Kaplan Arena (2,018); Williamsburg, VA
January 13, 2025; 9:00 p.m., CBSSN		Campbell	W 81–68	12–5 (3–1)	23 – Sherry	10 – 2 tied	6 – TJ Simpkins	Schar Center (2,061); Elon, NC
January 16, 2025; 7:00 p.m., FloHoops		at Drexel	W 65–54	13–5 (4–1)	19 – Sherry	9 – Sherry	3 – 2 tied	Daskalakis Athletic Center (959); Philadelphia, PA
January 18, 2025; 2:00 p.m., FloHoops		at Delaware	L 77–79	13–6 (4–2)	21 – TJ Simpkins	6 – 2 tied	4 – TK Simpkins	Bob Carpenter Center (2,262); Newark, DE
January 23, 2025; 7:00 p.m., FloHoops		Monmouth	W 83–71	14–6 (5–2)	26 – TJ Simpkins	8 – Sherry	3 – 2 tied	Schar Center (2,078); Elon, NC
January 25, 2025; 7:00 p.m., FloHoops		Charleston	L 62–76	14–7 (5–3)	20 – TK Simpkins	7 – Sherry	4 – TJ Simpkins	Schar Center (2,657); Elon, NC
January 30, 2025; 7:00 p.m., FloHoops		Hofstra	L 63–74	14–8 (5–4)	18 – TJ Simpkins	10 – Sherry	4 – 2 tied	Schar Center; Elon, NC
February 1, 2025; 7:00 p.m., FloHoops		Northeastern	W 71–60	15–8 (6–4)	19 – Dorn	14 – Van Komen	4 – TK Simpkins	Schar Center (2,621); Elon, NC
February 6, 2025; 7:00 p.m., FloHoops		at Campbell	L 58–76	15–9 (6–5)	12 – Sherry	10 – Van Komen	2 – 2 tied	Gore Arena (1,913); Buies Creek, NC
February 8, 2025; 6:00 p.m., FloHoops		at Charleston	L 83–88 ^{OT}	15–10 (6–6)	21 – Dorn	10 – Van Komen	5 – King	TD Arena (5,007); Charleston, SC
February 13, 2025; 7:00 p.m., FloHoops		North Carolina A&T	L 59–60	15–11 (6–7)	14 – TJ Simpkins	8 – Van Komen	3 – Sherry	Schar Center (1,857); Elon, NC
February 15, 2025; 7:00 p.m., FloHoops		at UNC Wilmington	W 81–70	16–11 (7–7)	32 – TK Simpkins	7 – 2 tied	7 – King	Trask Coliseum (5,200); Wilmington, NC
February 20, 2025; 7:00 p.m., FloHoops		Towson	W 69–63	17–11 (8–7)	28 – TK Simpkins	8 – Van Komen	6 – King	Schar Center (1,859); Elon, NC
February 22, 2025; 7:00 p.m., FloHoops		William & Mary	L 70–79	17–12 (8–8)	30 – TK Simpkins	11 – Van Komen	3 – TK Simpkins	Schar Center (2,102); Elon, NC
February 27, 2025; 7:00 p.m., FloHoops		at Monmouth	L 76–79	17–13 (8–9)	22 – TK Simpkins	12 – Van Komen	7 – King	OceanFirst Bank Center (2,102); West Long Branch, NJ
March 1, 2025; 6:00 p.m., CBSSN		at Stony Brook	L 66–71	17–14 (8–10)	19 – TK Simpkins	7 – Harrell	5 – TK Simpkins	Stony Brook Arena (2,926); Stony Brook, NY
CAA tournament
March 8, 2025; 12:00 p.m., FloHoops	(9)	vs. (8) Drexel; Second round	L 74–91	17–15	23 – 2 tied	5 – Sherry	8 – King	CareFirst Arena; Washington, D.C.
CBI
March 23, 2025; 2:00 p.m., FloHoops		vs. Army; First round	L 78–83	17–16	23 – Sherry	14 – Sherry	4 – O'Neil	Ocean Center; Daytona Beach, FL
*Non-conference game. ^{#}Rankings from AP poll. (#) Tournament seedings in parentheses. All times are in Eastern.
