= 2024–25 UNC Wilmington Seahawks men's basketball team =

American college basketball season

2024–25 UNC Wilmington Seahawks men's basketball

CAA tournament champions

NCAA tournament, First Round
- Conference: Coastal Athletic Association
- Record: 27–8 (14–4 CAA)
- Head coach: Takayo Siddle (5th season)
- Associate head coach: Kurt Kanaskie
- Assistant coaches: Craig Ponder; Paul Hemrick; Hunter Henderson; Austin Parker
- Home arena: Trask Coliseum

2024–25 CAA men's basketball standings
	Conf.				Overall
Team	W		L	PCT	W		L	PCT
Towson	16	–	2	.889	22	–	11	.667
UNC Wilmington †	14	–	4	.778	27	–	8	.771
Charleston	13	–	5	.722	24	–	9	.727
William & Mary	11	–	7	.611	17	–	15	.531
Campbell	10	–	8	.556	15	–	17	.469
Monmouth	10	–	8	.556	13	–	20	.394
Northeastern	9	–	9	.500	17	–	15	.531
Drexel	9	–	9	.500	18	–	15	.545
Elon	8	–	10	.444	17	–	16	.515
Hampton	8	–	10	.444	17	–	16	.515
Hofstra	6	–	12	.333	15	–	18	.455
Delaware	5	–	13	.278	16	–	20	.444
Stony Brook	4	–	14	.222	8	–	24	.250
North Carolina A&T	3	–	15	.167	7	–	25	.219
† 2025 CAA tournament winner

The 2024–25 UNC Wilmington Seahawks men's basketball team represented the University of North Carolina Wilmington during the 2024–25 NCAA Division I men's basketball season. The Seahawks were led by fifth-year head coach Takayo Siddle and played their home games at Trask Coliseum in Wilmington, North Carolina as members of the Coastal Athletic Association (CAA).

== Previous season ==
The Seahawks finished the 2023–24 season 21–10, 12–6 in CAA play, to finish in a tie for third place. They were defeated by fifth seed Towson in the quarterfinals of the CAA tournament.

== Roster ==
2024–25 UNC Wilmington Seahawks men's basketball team
Players
Coaches

Pos.	#	Name	Height	Weight	Year	Previous school	Hometown
G	0	Bo Montgomery	6 ft 5 in (1.96 m)	205 lb (93 kg)	GS	Holy Cross	Memphis, TN
G	1	Donovan Newby	6 ft 1 in (1.85 m)	185 lb (84 kg)	GS	Milwaukee	Chicago Heights, IL
F	3	Sean Moore	6 ft 7 in (2.01 m)	200 lb (91 kg)	GS	Fairleigh Dickinson	Columbus, OH
G	4	Nolan Hodge	6 ft 7 in (2.01 m)	190 lb (86 kg)	Jr	Northern Guilford HS	Greensboro, NC
G	5	Noah Ross	6 ft 7 in (2.01 m)	210 lb (95 kg)	Jr	Trinity Academy	Apex, NC
G	6	Makel Smith	6 ft 0 in (1.83 m)	175 lb (79 kg)	Fr	Morehead HS	Eden, NC
G	7	Greedy Williams	6 ft 5 in (1.96 m)	190 lb (86 kg)	Jr	Northwestern State	Montgomery, AL
G	8	Jake Murphy	6 ft 4 in (1.93 m)	205 lb (93 kg)	RS Jr	Air Force	Phoenix, AZ
G	12	Shane Anthony	6 ft 2 in (1.88 m)	170 lb (77 kg)	So	Crossroads Christian HS	Raleigh, NC
F	13	Makoi Mabor	6 ft 11 in (2.11 m)	240 lb (109 kg)	Fr	Gaston Christian	Rumbek, South Sudan
F	21	Khamari McGriff	6 ft 9 in (2.06 m)	210 lb (95 kg)	RS Jr	James S. Rickards HS	Tallahassee, FL
G	22	JoJo Fullwood	6 ft 2 in (1.88 m)	185 lb (84 kg)	Jr	Brunswick CC	Burgaw, NC
G	32	Joshua Corbin	6 ft 3 in (1.91 m)	190 lb (86 kg)	GS	Robert Morris	Gahanna, OH
F	55	Harlan Obioha	7 ft 0 in (2.13 m)	280 lb (127 kg)	Jr	Niagara	Hoxie, KS

Head coach

- Takayo Siddle (Gardner–Webb)

Assistant coach(es)

- Kurt Kanaskie (La Salle)
- Craig Ponder (UNC Wilmington)
- Paul Hemrick (Georgia)
- Hunter Henderson (NC State)
- Austin Parker (NC State)

Legend

- (C) Team captain
- (S) Suspended
- (I) Ineligible
- (W) Walk-on
- Injured
- Current redshirt

Roster
Last update: August 9, 2024

== Schedule and results ==
Date time, TV	Rank^{#}	Opponent^{#}	Result	Record	Site (attendance) city, state
Exhibition
October 30, 2024*; 7:00 p.m., FloHoops		Fayetteville State	W 77–71	–	Trask Coliseum (4,233); Wilmington, NC
Non-conference regular season
November 4, 2024*; 7:00 p.m., FloHoops		Mount Olive	W 143–91	1–0	Trask Coliseum (4,422); Wilmington, NC
November 8, 2024*; 7:00 p.m., FloHoops		Georgia Southern	W 92–84	2–0	Trask Stadium (4,949); Wilmington, NC
November 15, 2024*; 7:00 p.m., ESPN+		at USC Upstate	W 89–85	3–0	G. B. Hodge Center (596); Spartanburg, SC
November 19, 2024*; 8:00 p.m., ESPN+		at No. 1 Kansas	L 66–84	3–1	Allen Fieldhouse (15,300); Lawrence, KS
November 27, 2024*; 7:00 p.m., FloHoops		Colgate; Live Oak Bank Holiday Classic	L 59–72	3–2	Trask Coliseum (3,354); Wilmington, NC
November 29, 2024*; 4:00 p.m., FloHoops/Fox Wilmington		Sam Houston; Live Oak Bank Holiday Classic	W 69–60	4–2	Trask Coliseum (3,374); Wilmington, NC
November 30, 2024*; 3:00 p.m., FloHoops/Fox Wilmington		Appalachian State; Live Oak Bank Holiday Classic	W 76–61	5–2	Trask Coliseum (3,801); Wilmington, NC
December 3, 2024*; 7:00 p.m., ESPN+		at East Carolina	W 67–53	6–2	Williams Arena (4,515); Greenville, NC
December 7, 2024*; 2:00 p.m., FloSports/Fox Wilmington		Marshall	W 78–69	7–2	Trask Coliseum (4,811); Wilmington, NC
December 14, 2024*; 3:00 p.m., ESPN+		at Howard	L 83–88	7–3	Burr Gymnasium (499); Washington, D.C.
December 18, 2024*; 7:00 p.m., FloHoops		Florida Gulf Coast	W 79–66	8–3	Trask Coliseum (4,474); Wilmington, NC
December 21, 2024*; 2:00 p.m., FloHoops/Fox Wilmington		UNC Asheville	W 85–74	9–3	Trask Coliseum (3,402); Wilmington, NC
December 28, 2024*; 2:00 p.m., FloHoops/Fox Wilmington		Spartanburg Methodist	W 99–47	10–3	Trask Coliseum (4,536); Wilmington, NC
CAA regular season
January 2, 2025; 7:00 p.m., FloSports/Fox Wilmington		Towson	L 61–65 ^{OT}	10–4 (0–1)	Trask Coliseum (4,719); Wilmington, NC
January 4, 2025; 7:00 p.m., FloSports		Campbell	W 77–69	11–4 (1–1)	Trask Coliseum (5,200); Wilmington, NC
January 9, 2025; 7:00 p.m., FloSports		at Monmouth	W 64–55	12–4 (2–1)	OceanFirst Bank Center (1,238); West Long Branch, NJ
January 11, 2025; 1:00 p.m., FloSports		at Hofstra	L 63–66	12–5 (2–2)	Mack Sports Complex (1,738); Hempstead, NY
January 16, 2025; 7:00 p.m., FloSports/Fox Wilmington		Northeastern	W 80–72	13–5 (3–2)	Trask Coliseum (5,200); Wilmington, NC
January 20, 2025; 1:00 p.m., CBSSN		William & Mary	W 85–74	14–5 (4–2)	Trask Coliseum (5,200); Wilmington, NC
January 23, 2025; 7:00 p.m., FloSports		at Charleston	W 85–83	15–5 (5–2)	TD Arena (5,090); Charleston, SC
January 25, 2025; 7:00 p.m., FloHoops		Hampton	W 83–62	16–5 (6–2)	Trask Coliseum (5,200); Wilmington, NC
January 30, 2025; 7:00 p.m., FloSports		at North Carolina A&T	W 83–59	17– 5 (7–2)	Corbett Sports Center (1,658); Greensboro, NC
February 1, 2025; 7:00 p.m., FloHoops		Stony Brook	W 80–70	18–5 (8–2)	Trask Coliseum (5,200); Wilmington, NC
February 6, 2025; 6:30 p.m., FloSports		at Delaware	W 77–67	19–5 (9–2)	Bob Carpenter Center (2,031); Newark, DE
February 8, 2025; 2:00 p.m., CBSSN		at Drexel	W 81–79 ^{2OT}	20–5 (10–2)	Daskalakis Athletic Center (1,163); Philadelphia, PA
February 13, 2025; 7:00 p.m., CBSSN		Charleston	W 86–66	21–5 (11–2)	Trask Coliseum (5,200); Wilmington, NC
February 15, 2025; 7:00 p.m., CBSSN		Elon	L 70–81	21–6 (11–3)	Trask Coliseum (5,200); Wilmington, NC
February 22, 2025; 2:00 p.m., CBSSN		at Hampton	L 70–83	21–7 (11–4)	Hampton Convocation Center (3,416); Hampton, VA
February 24, 2025; 6:00 p.m., FloHoops		at William & Mary; Rescheduled from February 20	W 79–70	22–7 (12–4)	Kaplan Arena (3,464); Williamsburg, VA
February 27, 2025; 7:00 p.m., FloHoops		at Campbell	W 79–60	23–7 (13–4)	Gore Arena (2,350); Buies Creek, NC
March 1, 2025; 7:00 p.m., FloHoops		Delaware	W 88–58	24–7 (14–4)	Trask Coliseum (5,200); Wilmington, NC
CAA tournament
March 9, 2025; 6:00 p.m., FloHoops	(2)	vs. (10) Hampton; Quarterfinals	W 79–65	25–7	CareFirst Arena; Washington, D.C.
March 10, 2025; 8:30 p.m., CBSSN	(2)	vs. (3) Charleston; Semifinals	W 68–67	26–7	CareFirst Arena (2,367); Washington, D.C.
March 11, 2025; 7:00 p.m., CBSSN	(2)	vs. (12) Delaware; Championship	W 76–72	27–7	CareFirst Arena; Washington, D.C.
NCAA tournament
March 20, 2025*; 10:10 p.m., TruTV	(14 W)	vs. (3 W) No. 9 Texas Tech; First Round	L 72–82	27–8	Intrust Bank Arena; Wichita, KS
*Non-conference game. ^{#}Rankings from AP poll. (#) Tournament seedings in parentheses. W=West. All times are in Eastern.
