= 2024–25 Stony Brook Seawolves men's basketball team =

American college basketball season

2024–25 Stony Brook Seawolves men's basketball

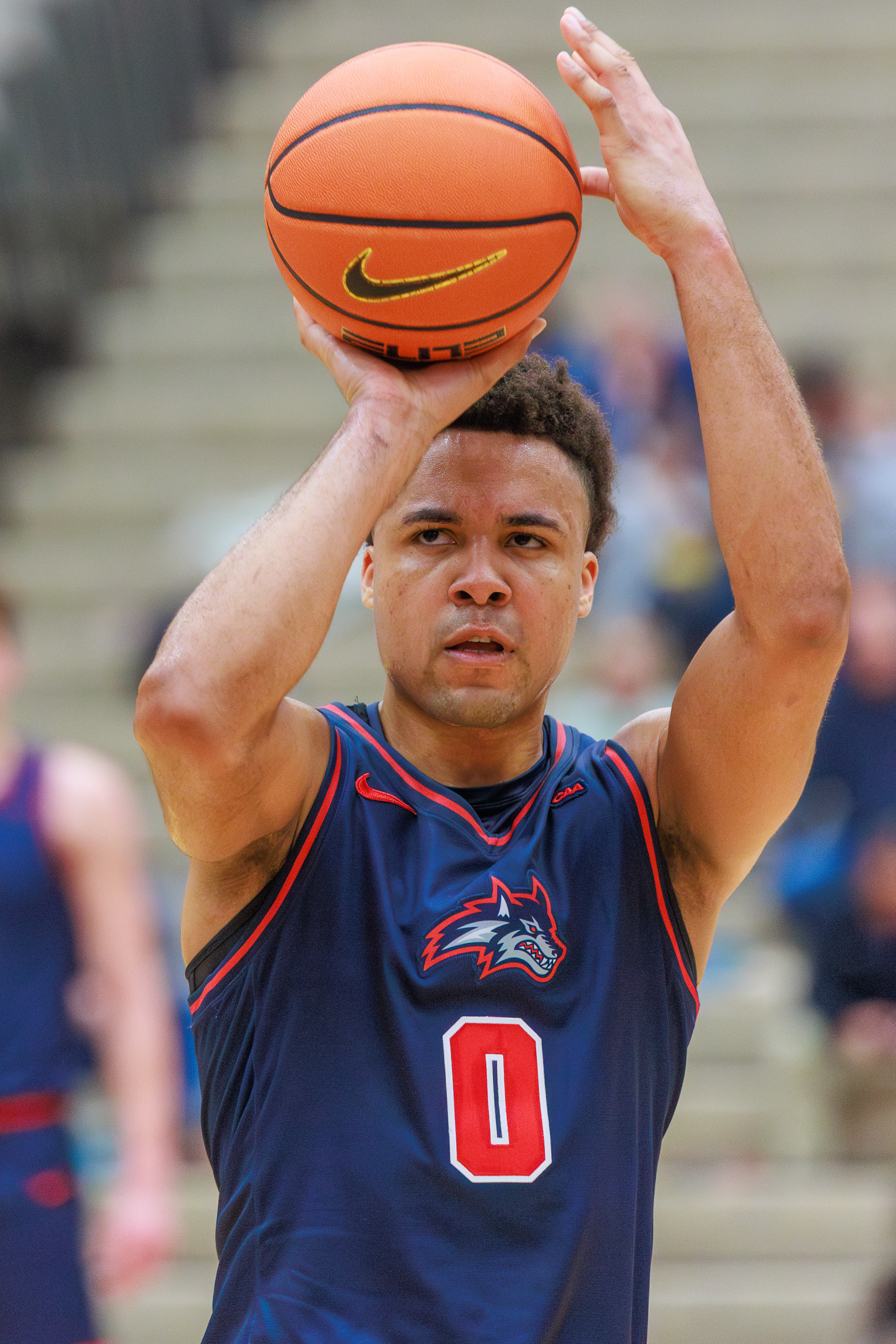
- Seawolf Joe Octave scored 24 points against Brown
- Conference: Coastal Athletic Association
- Record: 8–24 (4–14 CAA)
- Head coach: Geno Ford (6th season)
- Associate head coach: Dan Rickard
- Assistant coaches: Jaden Uken; Mark Dixon
- Home arena: Stony Brook Arena

2024–25 CAA men's basketball standings
	Conf.				Overall
Team	W		L	PCT	W		L	PCT
Towson	16	–	2	.889	22	–	11	.667
UNC Wilmington †	14	–	4	.778	27	–	8	.771
Charleston	13	–	5	.722	24	–	9	.727
William & Mary	11	–	7	.611	17	–	15	.531
Campbell	10	–	8	.556	15	–	17	.469
Monmouth	10	–	8	.556	13	–	20	.394
Northeastern	9	–	9	.500	17	–	15	.531
Drexel	9	–	9	.500	18	–	15	.545
Elon	8	–	10	.444	17	–	16	.515
Hampton	8	–	10	.444	17	–	16	.515
Hofstra	6	–	12	.333	15	–	18	.455
Delaware	5	–	13	.278	16	–	20	.444
Stony Brook	4	–	14	.222	8	–	24	.250
North Carolina A&T	3	–	15	.167	7	–	25	.219
† 2025 CAA tournament winner

The 2024–25 Stony Brook Seawolves men's basketball team represented Stony Brook University during the 2024–25 NCAA Division I men's basketball season. The Seawolves, led by sixth-year head coach Geno Ford, played their home games at Stony Brook Arena located in Stony Brook, New York as members of the Coastal Athletic Association.

== Previous season ==
The Seawolves finished the 2023–24 season 20–15, 10–8 in CAA play to finish in a three-way tie for sixth place. They defeated Northeastern, Drexel, and Hofstra before falling to top-seeded Charleston in the CAA tournament championship game.

== Roster ==
2024–25 Stony Brook Seawolves men's basketball team
Players
Coaches

Pos.	#	Name	Height	Weight	Year	Previous school	Hometown
G	0	Joe Octave	6 ft 4 in (1.93 m)	200 lb (91 kg)	GS	Holy Cross	Gardena, California
G	1	Sabry Philip	6 ft 4 in (1.93 m)	205 lb (93 kg)	GS	Navarro College	Edmonton, Alberta
G	3	CJ Luster II	6 ft 3 in (1.91 m)	165 lb (75 kg)	Jr	Salt Lake CC	Denton, Texas
G	4	Toby Onyekonwu	6 ft 2 in (1.88 m)	170 lb (77 kg)	Jr	Joliet West HS	Joliet, Illinois
F	5	Ben Wight	6 ft 9 in (2.06 m)	220 lb (100 kg)	GS	Toledo	Columbus, Ohio
G	6	Jared Frey	6 ft 6 in (1.98 m)	196 lb (89 kg)	So	Andrews Osborne Academy	Columbus, Ohio
G/F	11	Nick Woodard	6 ft 6 in (1.98 m)	215 lb (98 kg)	Jr	Southwest Tennessee CC	Oglethorpe, Georgia
G	12	Bryan Mitchell	6 ft 1 in (1.85 m)	160 lb (73 kg)	Fr	IMG Academy	Englewood Cliffs, New Jersey
G	13	Collin O'Connor	6 ft 3 in (1.91 m)	195 lb (88 kg)	Fr	Western Reserve Academy	Dayton, Ohio
F	15	Quin Gorman	6 ft 8 in (2.03 m)	210 lb (95 kg)	Fr	Flint Hill School	Falls Church, Virginia
G/F	21	Andre Snoddy	6 ft 6 in (1.98 m)	223 lb (101 kg)	Sr	Central Connecticut	Melville, New York
G/F	24	Peyton Frey	6 ft 6 in (1.98 m)	210 lb (95 kg)	So	Hilliard Davidson HS	Columbus, Ohio
F	33	Leon Nahar	6 ft 10 in (2.08 m)	218 lb (99 kg)	So	Asheville School	Alkmaar, Netherlands
F	34	Jeremiah Nyarko	6 ft 9 in (2.06 m)	200 lb (91 kg)	Jr	Western Texas College	Accra, Ghana

Head coach

- Geno Ford (Ohio)

Assistant coach(es)

- Dan Rickard (Stony Brook)
- Jaden Uken (Nebraska)
- Mark Dixon (FIU)

Legend

- (C) Team captain
- (S) Suspended
- (I) Ineligible
- (W) Walk-on
- Injured
- Current redshirt

Roster
Last update: November 4, 2024

== Schedule and results ==
Date time, TV	Rank^{#}	Opponent^{#}	Result	Record	Site (attendance) city, state
Non-conference regular season
November 4, 2024*; 8:30 pm, FS1		at No. 18 Marquette; Marquette Challenge	L 62–102	0–1	Fiserv Forum (14,546); Milwaukee, WI
November 7, 2024*; 7:00 pm, ESPN+		at Central Michigan; Marquette Challenge	W 73–72	1–1	McGuirk Arena (2,002); Mount Pleasant, MI
November 11, 2024*; 7:00 pm, ESPN+		at George Mason; Marquette Challenge	L 56–94	1–2	EagleBank Arena (2,916); Fairfax, VA
November 16, 2024*; 6:31 pm, FloHoops		St. Joseph's–Long Island	W 93–45	2–2	Stony Brook Arena (2,526); Stony Brook, NY
November 20, 2024*; 6:31 pm, FloHoops		Yale	L 64–86	2–3	Stony Brook Arena (1,851); Stony Brook, NY
November 23, 2024*; 7:00 pm, SNY/ESPN+		at Columbia	L 63–82	2–4	Levien Gymnasium (914); New York, NY
November 27, 2024*; 2:00 pm, ESPN+		at Brown	L 54–77	2–5	Pizzitola Sports Center (394); Providence, RI
December 1, 2024*; 1:00 pm, FloHoops		Norfolk State	L 66–77	2–6	Stony Brook Arena; Stony Brook, NY
December 7, 2024*; 4:00 pm		vs. Air Force; Texas Legends Showcase	L 61–69	2–7	Comerica Center (1,142); Frisco, TX
December 14, 2024*; 1:00 pm, ESPN+		at Rider	W 72–55	3–7	Alumni Gymnasium (1,009); Lawrenceville, NJ
December 17, 2024*; 7:00 pm, FloHoops		Marist	L 66–68	3–8	Stony Brook Arena (1,699); Stony Brook, NY
December 21, 2024*; 1:00 pm, FloHoops		Maine	W 74–72	4–8	Stony Brook Arena (2,081); Stony Brook, NY
December 29, 2024*; 2:00 pm, ESPN+		at Albany	L 70–77	4–9	Broadview Center (1,667); Albany, NY
CAA regular season
January 2, 2025; 7:00 pm, FloHoops		at Monmouth	L 56–78	4–10 (0–1)	OceanFirst Bank Center (1,310); West Long Branch, NJ
January 4, 2025; 12:00 pm, FloHoops		William & Mary	L 76–83	4–11 (0–2)	Stony Brook Arena (2,031); Stony Brook, NY
January 9, 2025; 7:00 pm, FloHoops		Drexel	L 51–67	4–12 (0–3)	Stony Brook Arena (1,636); Stony Brook, NY
January 11, 2025; 7:00 pm, FloHoops		Northeastern	L 66–70	4–13 (0–4)	Stony Brook Arena (2,367); Stony Brook, NY
January 16, 2025; 6:30 pm, FloHoops		at Delaware	L 74–84	4–14 (0–5)	Bob Carpenter Center (1,443); Newark, DE
January 18, 2025; 2:00 pm, FloHoops		at Towson	L 49–53	4–15 (0–6)	TU Arena (2,611); Towson, MD
January 23, 2025; 7:00 pm, FloHoops		Campbell	L 54–79	4–16 (0–7)	Stony Brook Arena (1,702); Stony Brook, NY
January 25, 2025; 12:00 pm, FloHoops		North Carolina A&T	W 89–74	5–16 (1–7)	Stony Brook Arena (2,804); Stony Brook, NY
January 30, 2025; 6:00 pm, CBSSN		at Charleston	L 74–81	5–17 (1–8)	TD Arena (4,727); Charleston, SC
February 1, 2025; 7:00 pm, FloHoops		at UNC Wilmington	L 70–80	5–18 (1–9)	Trask Coliseum (5,200); Wilmington, NC
February 6, 2025; 6:31 pm, FloHoops		Towson	L 59–66	5–19 (1–10)	Stony Brook Arena (1,526); Stony Brook, NY
February 8, 2025; 4:00 pm, FloHoops/MSG		at Hofstra; Battle of Long Island	W 80–75	6–19 (2–10)	Mack Sports Complex (3,819); Hempstead, NY
February 13, 2025; 5:00 pm, CBSSN		Monmouth	L 69–79	6–20 (2–11)	Stony Brook Arena (1,428); Stony Brook, NY
February 15, 2025; 3:30 pm, CBSSN		at Northeastern	L 60–71	6–21 (2–12)	Matthews Arena (1,124); Boston, MA
February 22, 2025; 2:00 pm, FloHoops		at North Carolina A&T	L 72–73	6–22 (2–13)	Corbett Sports Center (1,203); Greensboro, NC
February 24, 2025; 12:00 pm, FloHoops		at Hampton	L 49–81	6–23 (2–14)	Hampton Convocation Center (478); Hampton, VA
February 27, 2025; 7:00 pm, FloHoops		Hofstra; Battle of Long Island	W 59–56	7–23 (3–14)	Stony Brook Arena (2,286); Stony Brook, NY
March 1, 2025; 6:00 pm, CBSSN		Elon	W 71–66	8–23 (4–14)	Stony Brook Arena (2,926); Stony Brook, NY
CAA tournament
March 7, 2025; 2:00 pm, FloHoops	(13)	vs. (12) Delaware; First round	L 76–80	8–24	CareFirst Arena; Washington, D.C.
*Non-conference game. ^{#}Rankings from AP Poll. (#) Tournament seedings in parentheses. All times are in Eastern.
