= 2024–25 William & Mary Tribe men's basketball team =

American college basketball season

2024–25 William & Mary Tribe men's basketball
- Conference: Coastal Athletic Association
- Record: 17–15 (11–7 CAA)
- Head coach: Brian Earl (1st season)
- Assistant coaches: Jimmy Fenerty; Max Ginsberg; Alex Mumphard
- Home arena: Kaplan Arena

2024–25 CAA men's basketball standings
	Conf.				Overall
Team	W		L	PCT	W		L	PCT
Towson	16	–	2	.889	22	–	11	.667
UNC Wilmington †	14	–	4	.778	27	–	8	.771
Charleston	13	–	5	.722	24	–	9	.727
William & Mary	11	–	7	.611	17	–	15	.531
Campbell	10	–	8	.556	15	–	17	.469
Monmouth	10	–	8	.556	13	–	20	.394
Northeastern	9	–	9	.500	17	–	15	.531
Drexel	9	–	9	.500	18	–	15	.545
Elon	8	–	10	.444	17	–	16	.515
Hampton	8	–	10	.444	17	–	16	.515
Hofstra	6	–	12	.333	15	–	18	.455
Delaware	5	–	13	.278	16	–	20	.444
Stony Brook	4	–	14	.222	8	–	24	.250
North Carolina A&T	3	–	15	.167	7	–	25	.219
† 2025 CAA tournament winner

The 2024–25 William & Mary Tribe men's basketball team represented the College of William & Mary during the 2024–25 NCAA Division I men's basketball season. The Tribe, led by first-year head coach Brian Earl, played their home games at Kaplan Arena in Williamsburg, Virginia, as members of the Coastal Athletic Association.

== Previous season ==
The Tribe finished the 2023–24 season 10–23, 4–14 in CAA play to finish in 13th place. They defeated North Carolina A&T in the first round of the CAA tournament, before falling to Towson in the second round.

== Offseason ==
=== Departures ===
Name	Number	Pos.	Height	Weight	Year	Hometown	Reason for departure
Jake Milkereit	1	G	6'5"	200	Senior	Dallas, Texas	Graduated
Sean Houpt	7	G	6'4"	200	Graduate Student	Danville, Illinois	Graduated
Trey Moss	8	G	6'3"	185	Sophomore	Orlando, Florida	Transferred to George Washington
Jack Karasinski	11	G/F	6'7"	215	Sophomore	Grand Rapids, Michigan	Transferred to Bellarmine
Jayden Lemond	12	G	6'4"	185	Freshman	Marietta, Georgia	Transferred to Binghamton
Tai Hamilton	24	G/F	6'10"	195	Freshman	Upper Marlboro, Maryland	Transferred to Winthrop
Charlie Williams	33	F	6'10"	220	Sophomore	Carmel, Indiana	Transferred to Lipscomb

=== Incoming transfers ===
Name	Number	Pos.	Height	Weight	Year	Hometown	Previous School
Kyle Frazier	7	G	6'3"	195	Junior	Matthews, North Carolina	Transferred from Belmont Abbey
Malachi Ndur	10	F	6'8"	225	Graduate Student	St. Thomas, Ontario	Transferred from Brown
Kyle Pulliam	12	G	6'5"	180	Junior	Silver Spring, Maryland	Transferred from St. Thomas Aquinas
Keller Boothby	24	F	6'7"	210	Graduate Student	Plano, Texas	Transferred from Cornell
Finn Lally	43	F	6'9"	210	Junior	Hamilton, New Zealand	Transferred from Trinidad State

=== 2024 recruiting class ===
College recruiting information
Name	Hometown	School	Height	Weight	Commit date
Isaiah Mbeng; G	Potomac, Maryland	Winston Churchill High School	6 ft 2 in (1.88 m)	170 lb (77 kg)	Jun 3, 2024
Isaiah Mbeng; G	Recruit ratings: Scout: Rivals: (NR)				
Colin Ndaw; G	Dakar, Senegal	IMG Academy	6 ft 4 in (1.93 m)	180 lb (82 kg)	Jul 31, 2024
Colin Ndaw; G	Recruit ratings: Scout: Rivals: (NR)				
Luke Kinkade; G	Naperville, Illinois	Neuqua Valley High School	6 ft 2 in (1.88 m)	180 lb (82 kg)	Jul 31, 2024
Luke Kinkade; G	Recruit ratings: Scout: Rivals: (NR)				
Ryan Jackson Jr. G/F	Mesa, Arizona	AZ Compass Prep School	6 ft 7 in (2.01 m)	205 lb (93 kg)	Apr 29, 2024
Ryan Jackson Jr. G/F	Recruit ratings: Scout: Rivals: (NR)				
Overall recruit ranking:
Note: In many cases, Scout, Rivals, 247Sports, On3, and ESPN may conflict in their listings of height and weight.; In these cases, the average was taken. ESPN grades are on a 100-point scale.; Sources: "2024 Team Ranking". Rivals.

== Roster ==
2024–25 William & Mary Tribe men's basketball team
Players
Coaches

Pos.	#	Name	Height	Weight	Year	Previous school	Hometown
F	0	Caleb Dorsey	6 ft 8 in (2.03 m)	235 lb (107 kg)	Sr	Penn State	Westminster, Maryland
G	1	Isaiah Mbeng	6 ft 2 in (1.88 m)	170 lb (77 kg)	Fr	Winston Churchill High School	Potomac, Maryland
G	2	Chase Lowe	6 ft 5 in (1.96 m)	201 lb (91 kg)	Jr	Weddington High School	Weddington, North Carolina
G	4	Matteus Case	6 ft 5 in (1.96 m)	196 lb (89 kg)	Sr	Providence	Pickering, Ontario
F	5	Noah Collier	6 ft 8 in (2.03 m)	220 lb (100 kg)	Sr	Pittsburgh	Mullica Hill, New Jersey
G	6	Colin Ndaw	6 ft 4 in (1.93 m)	180 lb (82 kg)	Fr	IMG Academy	Dakar, Senegal
G	7	Kyle Frazier	6 ft 3 in (1.91 m)	195 lb (88 kg)	Jr	Belmont Abbey	Matthews, North Carolina
F	10	Malachi Ndur	6 ft 8 in (2.03 m)	225 lb (102 kg)	GS	Brown	St. Thomas, Ontario
G	12	Kyle Pulliam	6 ft 5 in (1.96 m)	180 lb (82 kg)	Jr	St. Thomas Aquinas	Silver Spring, Maryland
G	12	Luke Kinkade	6 ft 2 in (1.88 m)	180 lb (82 kg)	Fr	Neuqua Valley High School	Naperville, Illinois
G/F	15	Ryan Jackson	6 ft 7 in (2.01 m)	205 lb (93 kg)	Fr	AZ Compass Prep School	Mesa, Arizona
G/F	21	Gabe Dorsey	6 ft 6 in (1.98 m)	215 lb (98 kg)	Sr	Vanderbilt	Westminster, Maryland
F	22	Nick Evans	6 ft 9 in (2.06 m)	212 lb (96 kg)	RS So	Gonzaga	Alexandria, Virginia
F	24	Keller Boothby	6 ft 7 in (2.01 m)	210 lb (95 kg)	GS	Cornell	Plano, Texas
G	25	Miles Hicks	6 ft 1 in (1.85 m)	156 lb (71 kg)	Jr	St. Albans School	Upper Marlboro, Maryland
G	43	Finn lally	6 ft 9 in (2.06 m)	210 lb (95 kg)	Fr	Trinidad State	Hamilton, New Zealand

Head coach

- Brian Earl (Princeton)

Assistant coach(es)

- Jimmy Fenerty (Dickinson)
- Max Ginsberg (Cornell)
- Alex Mumphard (Greenville)

Legend

- (C) Team captain
- (S) Suspended
- (I) Ineligible
- (W) Walk-on
- Injured
- Current redshirt

Roster
Last update: August 27, 2024

== Schedule and results ==
Date time, TV	Rank^{#}	Opponent^{#}	Result	Record	Site (attendance) city, state
Non-conference regular season
November 4, 2024*; 7:00 pm, FloHoops		Dickinson	W 84–36	1–0	Kaplan Arena (2,152); Williamsburg, VA
November 8, 2024*; 7:00 pm, ESPN+		at Radford	L 77–89	1–1	Dedmon Center (1,211); Radford, VA
November 12, 2024*; 7:00 pm, FloHoops		Norfolk State	W 84–73	2–1	Kaplan Arena (2,210); Williamsburg, VA
November 15, 2024*; 5:00 pm, ESPN+		at Winthrop; Rock Hill Classic	L 85–86	2–2	Rock Hill Sports & Event Center (777); Rock Hill, SC
November 16, 2024*; 7:30 pm, ESPN+		vs. North Carolina Central; Rock Hill Classic	L 76–78	2–3	Rock Hill Sports & Event Center (1,597); Rock Hill, SC
November 17, 2024*; 12:00 pm, ESPN+		vs. Georgia Southern; Rock Hill Classic	W 102–87	3–3	Rock Hill Sports & Event Center; Rock Hill, SC
November 22, 2024*; 7:00 pm, ACCNX/ESPN+		at NC State	L 61–84	3–4	Lenovo Center (13,219); Raleigh, NC
November 24, 2024*; 1:00 pm, ESPN+		at Appalachian State	L 76–79	3–5	Holmes Center (2,852); Boone, NC
December 2, 2024*; 7:00 pm, ESPN+		at Old Dominion; Rivalry	L 83–88	3–6	Chartway Arena (4,563); Norfolk, VA
December 4, 2024*; 7:00 pm, FloHoops		Virginia Lynchburg	W 109–55	4–6	Kaplan Arena (1,719); Williamsburg, VA
December 18, 2024*; 7:00 pm, FloHoops		Richmond	W 93–87	5–6	Kaplan Arena (2,393); Williamsburg, VA
December 22, 2024*; 2:00 pm, ESPN+		at VCU	L 70–90	5–7	Siegel Center (7,637); Richmond, VA
December 29, 2024*; 1:00 pm, FloHoops		Navy	W 82–76	6–7	Kaplan Arena (3,077); Williamsburg, VA
CAA regular season
January 2, 2025; 7:00 pm, FloHoops		at Hofstra	W 74–56	7–7 (1–0)	Mack Sports Complex (1,992); Hempstead, NY
January 4, 2025; 12:00 pm, FloHoops		at Stony Brook	W 83–76	8–7 (2–0)	Stony Brook Arena (2,031); Stony Brook, NY
January 9, 2025; 7:00 pm, CBSSN		Elon	W 78–65	9–7 (3–0)	Kaplan Arena (2,018); Williamsburg, VA
January 11, 2025; 2:00 pm, FloHoops		North Carolina A&T	W 81–78	10–7 (4–0)	Kaplan Arena (2,641); Williamsburg, VA
January 16, 2025; 7:00 pm, FloHoops		at Hampton	W 67–64	11–7 (5–0)	Hampton Convocation Center (1,654); Hampton, VA
January 20, 2025; 1:00 pm, CBSSN		at UNC Wilmington	L 74–85	11–8 (5–1)	Trask Coliseum (5,200); Wilmington, NC
January 23, 2025; 5:00 pm, CBSSN		Hampton	W 94–83	12–8 (6–1)	Kaplan Arena (3,019); Williamsburg, VA
January 25, 2025; 2:00 pm, FloHoops		Monmouth	W 78–73	13–8 (7–1)	Kaplan Arena (4,688); Williamsburg, VA
January 30, 2025; 7:00 pm, FloHoops		at Campbell	L 55–96	13–9 (7–2)	Gore Arena (1,459); Buies Creek, NC
February 3, 2025; 8:00 pm, CBSSN		Charleston	W 90–75	14–9 (8–2)	Kaplan Arena (3,461); Williamsburg, VA
February 6, 2025; 7:00 pm, FloHoops		at Drexel	L 66–86	14–10 (8–3)	Daskalakis Athletic Center (1,085); Philadelphia, PA
February 8, 2025; 2:00 pm, FloHoops		at Delaware	L 64–74	14–11 (8–4)	Bob Carpenter Center (2,405); Newark, DE
February 13, 2025; 7:00 pm, FloHoops		Hofstra	W 61–60	15–11 (9–4)	Kaplan Arena (2,855); Williamsburg, VA
February 15, 2025; 2:00 pm, FloHoops		Drexel	W 72–59	16–11 (10–4)	Kaplan Arena (5,103); Williamsburg, VA
February 22, 2025; 7:00 pm, FloHoops		at Elon	W 79–70	17–11 (11–4)	Schar Center (2,102); Elon, NC
February 24, 2025; 6:00 pm, FloHoops		UNC Wilmington	L 70–79	17–12 (11–5)	Kaplan Arena (3,464); Williamsburg, VA
February 27, 2025; 7:00 pm, FloHoops		at Towson	L 73–88	17–13 (11–6)	TU Arena (4,750); Towson, MD
March 1, 2025; 2:00 pm, FloHoops		Northeastern	L 68–70	17–14 (11–7)	Kaplan Arena (4,355); Williamsburg, VA
CAA tournament
March 9, 2025; 2:30 pm, FloHoops	(4)	vs. (12) Delaware; Quarterfinals	L 78–100	17–15	CareFirst Arena (2,878); Washington, D.C.
*Non-conference game. ^{#}Rankings from AP Poll. (#) Tournament seedings in parentheses. All times are in Eastern.
