= UNC Wilmington Seahawks men's basketball =

Men's basketball team

2025–26 UNC Wilmington Seahawks men's basketball team
- University: University of North Carolina Wilmington
- First season: 1976
- Head coach: Takayo Siddle (6th season)
- Location: Wilmington, North Carolina
- Arena: Trask Coliseum (capacity: 5,200)
- Conference: Coastal Athletic Association
- Nickname: Seahawks
- Colors: Teal, gold, and navy
- Student section: Screaming Seahawks

NCAA Division I tournament round of 32
- 2002

NCAA Division I tournament appearances
- 2000, 2002, 2003, 2006, 2016, 2017, 2025

Conference tournament champions
- 2000, 2002, 2003, 2006, 2016, 2017, 2025

Conference regular-season champions
- 1997, 1998, 2002, 2003, 2006, 2015, 2016, 2017, 2022, 2026

Uniforms
Home	Away

The UNC Wilmington Seahawks men's basketball team represents the University of North Carolina Wilmington. The team plays in the Coastal Athletic Association. The Seahawks are currently coached by Takayo Siddle. UNC Wilmington has appeared seven times in the NCAA Division I men's basketball tournament, most recently in 2025. At the 2002 NCAA tournament, the Seahawks won their first-ever NCAA tournament game, upsetting 4-seed USC 93-89 in overtime.

== History ==
=== Conference memberships ===
- 1976–1984: Independent
- 1984–present: Coastal Athletic Association

== Season-by-season results ==
Record table
Season	Coach	Overall	Conference	Standing	Postseason
Mel Gibson (Independent) (1976–1986)
1976–77	Mel Gibson	16–10	–	–	–
1977–78	Mel Gibson	19–7	–	–	–
1978–79	Mel Gibson	19–8	–	–	–
1979–80	Mel Gibson	19–10	–	–	–
1980–81	Mel Gibson	13–13	–	–	–
1981–82	Mel Gibson	13–14	–	–	–
1982–83	Mel Gibson	11–16	–	–	–
1983–84	Mel Gibson	11–17	–	–	–
Mel Gibson (Colonial Athletic Association) (1984–1986)
1984–85	Mel Gibson	12–16	4–11	6th	–
1985–86	Mel Gibson	16–13	7–9	4th	–
Mel Gibson:		149–124	11–20		
Robert McPherson (Colonial Athletic Association) (1986–1990)
1986–87	Robert McPherson	18–12	11–6	2nd	–
1987–88	Robert McPherson	15–14	9–7	4th	–
1988–89	Robert McPherson	16–14	9–5	3rd	–
1989–90	Robert McPherson	8–20	3–11	7th	–
Robert McPherson:		57–60	34–31		
Kevin Eastman (Colonial Athletic Association) (1990–1994)
1990–91	Kevin Eastman	11–17	6–8	5th	–
1991–92	Kevin Eastman	13–15	6–8	5th	–
1992–93	Kevin Eastman	17–11	6–8	4th	–
1993–94	Kevin Eastman	18–10	9–5	3rd	–
Kevin Eastman:		59–53	29–33		
Jerry Wainwright (Colonial Athletic Association) (1994–2002)
1994–95	Jerry Wainwright	16–11	10–4	2nd	–
1995–96	Jerry Wainwright	13–16	9–7	3rd	–
1996–97	Jerry Wainwright	16–14	10–6	T1st	–
1997–98	Jerry Wainwright	20–11	13–3	T1st	NIT First round
1998–99	Jerry Wainwright	11–17	9–7	T–4th	–
1999–2000	Jerry Wainwright	18–13	8–8	4th	NCAA first round
2000–01	Jerry Wainwright	19–11	11–5	T–2nd	NIT First round
2001–02	Jerry Wainwright	23–10	14–4	1st	NCAA second round
Jerry Wainwright:		136–103	84–44		
Brad Brownell (Colonial Athletic Association) (2002–2006)
2002–03	Brad Brownell	24–7	15–3	1st	NCAA first round
2003–04	Brad Brownell	15–15	9–9	7th	–
2004–05	Brad Brownell	19–10	13–5	T–2nd	–
2005–06	Brad Brownell	25–8	15–3	1st	NCAA first round
Brad Brownell:		83–40	52–20		
Benny Moss (Colonial Athletic Association) (2006–2010)
2006–07	Benny Moss	7–22	4–14	T–10th	–
2007–08	Benny Moss	20–13	12–6	T–2nd	–
2008–09	Benny Moss	7–25	3–15	12th	–
2009–10	Benny Moss	7–14	3–7	n/a	
Benny Moss:		41–74	22–42		
Brooks Lee (Colonial Athletic Association) (2010–2010)
2009–10	Brooks Lee	2–8	2–6	T–9th	
Brooks Lee:		2–8	2–6		
Buzz Peterson (Colonial Athletic Association) (2010–2014)
2010–11	Buzz Peterson	13–17	7–11	7th	
2011–12	Buzz Peterson	10–20	5–13	T–8th	
2012–13	Buzz Peterson	10–20	5–13	9th	
2013–14	Buzz Peterson	9–23	3–13	9th	
Buzz Peterson:		42–80	20–50		
Kevin Keatts (Colonial Athletic Association) (2014–2017)
2014–15	Kevin Keatts	18–14	12–6	T–1st	CIT first round
2015–16	Kevin Keatts	25–8	14–4	T–1st	NCAA first round
2016–17	Kevin Keatts	29–6	15–3	1st	NCAA first round
Kevin Keatts:		72–28	41–13		
C. B. McGrath (Colonial Athletic Association) (2017–2020)
2017–18	C. B. McGrath	11–21	7–11	6th	
2018–19	C. B. McGrath	10–23	5–13	10th	
2019–20	C. B. McGrath	5–14	0–6	n/a	
C. B. McGrath:		26–58	12–30		
Rob Burke (Colonial Athletic Association) (2020–2020)
2019–20	Rob Burke	5-8	5–7	9th	
Rob Burke:		5-8	5-7		
Takayo Siddle (Colonial/Coastal Athletic Association) (2020–present)
2020–21	Takayo Siddle	7-10	1-6	10th	
2021–22	Takayo Siddle	27-9	15-3	T-1st	CBI Champion
2022–23	Takayo Siddle	24-10	12-6	T-3rd	
2023–24	Takayo Siddle	21-10	12-6	T-3rd	
2024-25	Takayo Siddle	27–8	14–4	2nd	NCAA first round
2025–26	Takayo Siddle	27–7	15–3	1st	NIT second round
Takayo Siddle:		133-54	69-28		
Total:		762–660			
National champion Postseason invitational champion Conference regular season champion Conference regular season and conference tournament champion Division regular season champion Division regular season and conference tournament champion Conference tournament champion

UNC Wilmington began playing Division I NCAA basketball in the 1976–77 season. The above records do not include the years UNC Wilmington played as a junior college (1951–63) or in the NAIA (1963–76).

== Postseason results ==
=== Division I NCAA tournament results ===
The Seahawks have appeared in the Division I NCAA tournament seven times. Their combined record is 1–7.

Year	Round	Seed	Opponent	Result
2000	First Round	#15	#2 Cincinnati	L 47–64
2002	First Round; Second Round	#13	#4 USC #5 Indiana	W 93–89 ^{OT} L 67–76
2003	First Round	#11	#6 Maryland	L 73–75
2006	First Round	#9	#8 George Washington	L 85–88 ^{OT}
2016	First Round	#13	#4 Duke	L 85–93
2017	First Round	#12	#5 Virginia	L 71–76
2025	First Round	#14	#3 Texas Tech	L 72–82

=== NIT results ===
The Seahawks have appeared in the National Invitation Tournament (NIT) three times. Their combined record is 1–3.

Year	Seed	Round	Opponent	Result
1998		First Round	Wake Forest	L 52–56
2001		First Round	Dayton	L 59–68
2026		First Round; Second Round	Yale; Dayton	W 68–67; L 61-80

=== CBI results ===
The Seahawks have appeared in the College Basketball Invitational (CBI) one time. They were the champions of the 2022 College Basketball Invitational. Their combined record is 4–0.

Year	Seed	Round	Opponent	Result
2022	#9	First Round; Quarterfinals; Semifinals; Finals	#8 VMI #1 Drake #12 Northern Colorado #2 MTSU	W 93–78; W 76–75; W 80–64; W 96–90^{2OT}

=== CIT results ===
The Seahawks appeared in the CollegeInsider.com Postseason Tournament (CIT) one time, with a record of 0–1.

Year	Round	Opponent	Result
2015	First Round	Sam Houston State	L 71–87

== Seahawks in the NBA ==
- Brian Rowsom
- Matt Fish
- Devontae Cacok
- Jaylen Sims

== Seahawks in international leagues ==
- Devontae Cacok (born 1996), basketball center for Hapoel Jerusalem of the Israeli Basketball Premier League, and formerly the NBA
- Adam Smith (born 1992), basketball player for Hapoel Holon in the Israel Basketball Premier League

== Former Seahawks as head coaches ==
Former UNC Wilmington Players

- Mark Byington, (1994–1998), Head basketball coach of Georgia Southern (2013–2020), James Madison (2020–2024),Vanderbilt (2024–present)
- John Calipari, (1978–80), Head basketball coach of UMass (1988–96), NBA New Jersey Nets (1996–99), Memphis (2000–09), Kentucky (2009–24), Arkansas (2024–present)
- Billy Donlon, (1995–99), Head basketball coach of Wright State (2010–2016), UMKC (2019–2022)
- Todd Lickliter, (1975–76), Head basketball coach of Butler (2001–07), Iowa (2007–10), Marian (2012–2015), Evansville (2020–2022)

Former UNC Wilmington Coaches

- Brad Brownell, UNC Wilmington Head Coach (2002–2006), Head basketball coach of Wright State (2006–10), Clemson (2010–present)
- Kirk Earlywine, UNC Wilmington Asst Coach (2006–07), Head basketball coach of Eastern Washington (2007–2011)
- Kevin Eastman, UNC Wilmington Head Coach (1990–94), Head basketball coach of Washington State (1994–99), NBA Boston Celtics Asst Coach (2004–2005)
- Frank Haith, UNC Wilmington Asst Coach (1990–92), Head basketball coach of Miami (FL) (2004–2011), Missouri (2011–2014), Tulsa (2014–2022)
- Dave Hanners, UNC Wilmington Asst Coach (1986–89), NBA Asst Coach Philadelphia 76ers (2000–03), Asst Detroit Pistons (2003–05), Asst New York Knicks (2005–06), Asst Charlotte Bobcats (2008–2010), Asst New Orleans Pelicans, (2010–2015)
- Kevin Keatts, UNC Wilmington Head Coach (2014–17), Head basketball coach of NC State (2017–2025)
- Jeff Reynolds, UNC Wilmington Asst Coach (1990–94), Head basketball coach of Wingate (1997–2000), US Air Force Academy (2007–2012)
- Byron Samuels, UNC Wilmington Asst Coach (1992–94), Head basketball coach of Hampton (1995–97), Radford (2002–2007), Florida A&M (2014–2017)
- Rodney Terry, UNC Wilmington Asst Coach (1998-2002), Head basketball coach of Fresno State (2011-2018), UTEP (2018–2021), Texas (2022-2025)
- Matt McMahon, UNC Wilmington Asst Coach (2010-11), Head basketball coach of Murray State (2015-2022), Head basketball coach of LSU (2022-present)
- Jerry Wainwright, UNC Wilmington Head Coach (1994–2002), Head basketball coach of Richmond (2002–05), DePaul (2005–2010)
