= Takayo Siddle =

American basketball player and coach (born 1986)

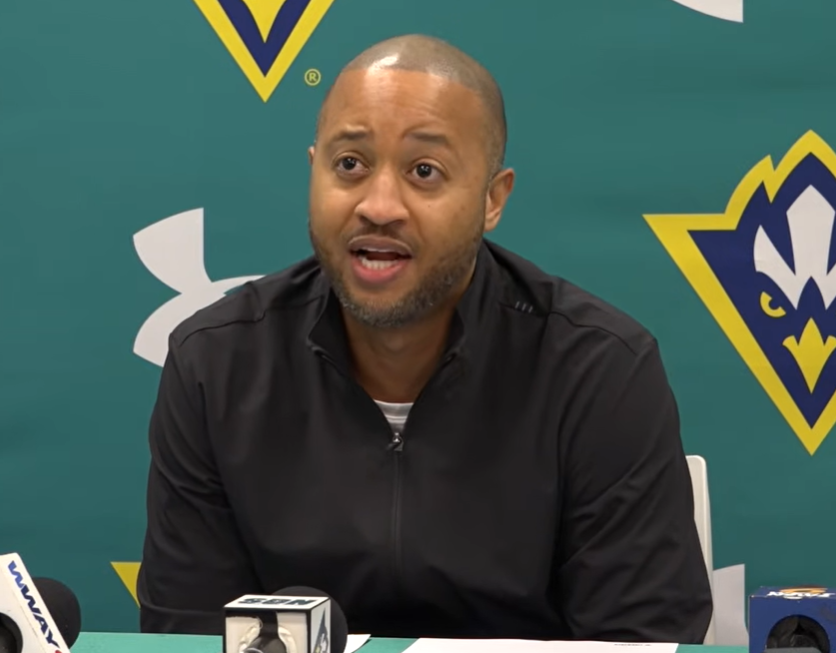
- Siddle in 2026

Current position
- Title: Head coach
- Team: UNC Wilmington
- Conference: CAA
- Record: 133–54 (.711)
- Annual salary: $1,000,000

Biographical details
- Born: May 25, 1986 (age 40); Eden, North Carolina, U.S.

Playing career
- 2005–2009: Gardner–Webb

Coaching career (HC unless noted)
- 2009–2010: Hargrave Military Academy (asst.)
- 2010–2014: Gardner–Webb (asst.)
- 2014–2017: UNC Wilmington (asst.)
- 2017–2020: NC State (asst.)
- 2020–present: UNC Wilmington

Head coaching record
- Overall: 133–54 (.711)
- Tournaments: 0–1 (NCAA); 4–0 (CBI); 1–1 (NIT)

Accomplishments and honors

Championships
- CBI (2022); 2× CAA regular season (2022, 2026); CAA tournament (2025)

Awards
- 2× CAA Coach of the Year (2022, 2026)

Takayo Lemont Siddle (born May 25, 1986) is an American basketball coach who is the current head coach of the UNC Wilmington Seahawks men's basketball team.

== Playing career ==
Siddle was a basketball standout at John Motley Morehead High School in Eden, North Carolina, averaging 27.0 points, 6.0 assists and 2.0 steals per game as a senior. He attended Hargrave Military Academy in 2004–05 and helped the team reach the prep school championship game. Siddle played college basketball at Gardner–Webb under Rick Scruggs. As a sophomore, Siddle averaged 8.6 points per game. In his junior season, Siddle scored eight points in a 84–68 Runnin' Bulldogs win at Rupp Arena vs. 20th-ranked Kentucky to advance to the final four of the 2007 2K Sports College Hoops Classic in Madison Square Garden.

== Coaching career ==
=== Assistant coach ===
After his playing career, Siddle became an assistant coach at Hargrave Military Academy for one season under Kevin Keatts. He then returned to his alma mater to work for as an assistant coach at Gardner–Webb for four seasons under both Chris Holtmann and Tim Craft.

Siddle then reunited with Keatts as an assistant coach at UNC Wilmington, where the Seahawks won back-to-back CAA regular season and conference tournament titles in 2016 and 2017. He was named interim coach of the Seahawks in March 2017.

He followed Keatts as an assistant at NC State from 2017 to 2020 before returning to UNC Wilmington as head coach on March 13, 2020, as the 13th head coach in Seahawk history. Siddle signed a five-year deal with a base salary of $300,000 plus supplemental compensation.

=== UNC Wilmington ===
Siddle took over a UNCW program that was 31-64 (.326) in the previous three seasons. Since then he has led UNCW to unprecedented success.

From the 2021-22 Season, Siddle has led the Seahawks to five-straight 20+ win seasons. He is the first coach in UNCW history with more than two 20-win seasons (Kevin Keatts and Brad Brownell both with two 20-win seasons).

Siddle also set the UNCW record for consecutive wins in back-to-back seasons: 12-straight wins in 2021-22; 13-straight wins in 2022-23.

In his first return to Rupp Arena since helping Gardner-Webb beat Kentucky as a player, Siddle led UNCW to an 80-73 win against Kentucky as head coach in December 2023.

== Head coaching record ==
Record table
Season	Team	Overall	Conference	Standing	Postseason
UNC Wilmington Seahawks (Colonial Athletic Association) (2020–2023)
2020–21	UNC Wilmington	7–10	1–6	10th	
2021–22	UNC Wilmington	27–9	15–3	T–1st	CBI Champion
2022–23	UNC Wilmington	24–10	12–6	T–3rd	
UNC Wilmington Seahawks (Coastal Athletic Association) (2023–present)
2023–24	UNC Wilmington	21–10	12–6	T–3rd	
2024–25	UNC Wilmington	27–8	14–4	2nd	NCAA Division I Round of 64
2025–26	UNC Wilmington	27–7	15–3	1st	NIT Second Round
2026–27	UNC Wilmington	0–0	0–0		
UNC Wilmington:		133–54 (.711)	69–28 (.711)		
Total:		133–54 (.711)			
National champion Postseason invitational champion Conference regular season champion Conference regular season and conference tournament champion Division regular season champion Division regular season and conference tournament champion Conference tournament champion
