= Tyler Tejada =

American basketball player (born 2005)

No. 8 – Cincinnati Bearcats
- Position: Small forward
- Conference: Big 12 Conference

Personal information
- Born: February 2, 2005 (age 21)
- Listed height: 6 ft 9 in (2.06 m)
- Listed weight: 230 lb (104 kg)

Career information
- High school: Teaneck (Teaneck, New Jersey)
- College: Towson (2023–2026); Cincinnati (2026–present)

Career highlights
- CAA Player of the Year (2025); First-team All-CAA (2025); CAA Rookie of the Year (2024); CAA All-Rookie Team (2024)

Tyler Tejada (born February 2, 2005) is an American college basketball player for the Cincinnati Bearcats of the Big 12 Conference. He previously played for the Towson Tigers. He was named Coastal Athletic Association Player of the Year in 2025, the first sophomore to earn the distinction since 1999.

== Early life ==
Tejada was born in Teaneck, New Jersey, and played varsity basketball for the Teaneck High School Highwaymen.

== College career ==
In his freshman year Tejada averaged 10.1 points and 3.3 rebounds per game, earning the title of CAA Rookie of the Year, and a spot on the CAA All-Rookie Team. In his sophomore season Tejada improved to 16.7 points and 3.9 rebounds per game, earning the title of CAA Player of the Year, and a spot on the All-CAA First Team. He averaged 17.7 points and 5.5 rebounds per game as a junior. Following the season he transferred to Cincinnati.

== Career statistics ==
Legend
GP	Games played	GS	Games started	MPG	Minutes per game
FG%	Field goal percentage	3P%	3-point field goal percentage	FT%	Free throw percentage
RPG	Rebounds per game	APG	Assists per game	SPG	Steals per game
BPG	Blocks per game	PPG	Points per game	**Bold**	Career high

=== NCAA Division I ===
Year	Team	GP	GS	MPG	FG%	3P%	FT%	RPG	APG	SPG	BPG	PPG
2023–24	Towson	**34**	27	23.2	.417	**.352**	.843	3.3	0.8	0.3	**0.4**	10.1
2024–25	Towson	27	25	31.8	.431	.331	.824	3.9	0.8	0.5	0.2	16.7
2025–26	Towson	32	**31**	**35.6**	**.432**	.291	**.882**	**5.5**	**2.3**	**0.8**	**0.4**	**17.7**
Career		93	83	30.0	.428	.323	.857	4.2	1.3	0.5	0.3	14.6
