= 2025–26 Charleston Cougars men's basketball team =

American college basketball season

2025–26 Charleston Cougars men's basketball
- Conference: Coastal Athletic Association
- Record: 21–11 (14–4 CAA)
- Head coach: Chris Mack (2nd season)
- Assistant coaches: Jeff McInnis; Jeremy Growe; Chris Harriman
- Home arena: TD Arena

2025–26 CAA men's basketball standings
	Conf.				Overall
Team	W		L	PCT	W		L	PCT
UNC Wilmington	15	–	3	.833	27	–	7	.794
Charleston	14	–	4	.778	21	–	11	.656
Hofstra †	12	–	6	.667	24	–	11	.686
Monmouth	11	–	7	.611	19	–	15	.559
Drexel	10	–	8	.556	17	–	16	.515
William & Mary	10	–	8	.556	20	–	12	.625
Towson	9	–	9	.500	19	–	15	.559
Stony Brook	9	–	9	.500	17	–	15	.531
Campbell	8	–	10	.444	16	–	18	.471
Hampton	7	–	11	.389	13	–	19	.406
Elon	6	–	12	.333	14	–	18	.438
North Carolina A&T	4	–	14	.222	11	–	19	.367
Northeastern	2	–	16	.111	7	–	24	.226
† 2026 CAA tournament winner

The 2025–26 Charleston Cougars men's basketball team represented the College of Charleston in the 2025–26 NCAA Division I men's basketball season. The Cougars, led by second-year head coach Chris Mack, played their home games at TD Arena in Charleston, South Carolina as a member of the Coastal Athletic Association. The Cougars finished the season 21–11, 14–4 in CAA play to finish in second place. They lost to Towson in the quarterfinals of the CAA tournament.

== Previous season ==
The Cougars, led by first-year head coach Chris Mack, finished the season 24–9, 13–5 in CAA play to finish in third place. The team defeated Monmouth in the quarterfinals of the CAA Tournament, before losing to UNC Wilmington in the semifinals.

== Offseason ==
=== Departures ===
Charleston departures
Name	Number	Pos.	Height	Weight	Year	Hometown	Reason for departure
AJ Smith	1	G	6'5"	210	JR	Charlotte, North Carolina	Transferred to Temple
Elijah Jones	3	F	6'7"	210	SR	South Holland, Illinois	Transferred to Longwood
Derrin Boyd	4	G	6'3"	210	GS	Princeton, Kentucky	Graduated
Deywilk Tavarez	5	G	6'3"	190	SO	Pennsauken, New Jersey	Transferred to Loyola Chicago
CJ Fulton	6	G	6'3"	190	SR	Belfast, Northern Ireland	Graduated
Justas Stonkus	8	G	6'6"	210	FR	Plungė, Lithuania	Transferred to N/A
Ante Brzovic	10	F	6'10"	225	SR	Zagreb, Croatia	Graduated
Stef van Bussel	15	C	6'10"	255	SO	Ommel, Netherlands	Transferred to Duquesne
Lazar Đjoković	17	F	6'10"	230	SO	Gornji Milanovac, Serbia	Transferred to VCU
Jack Miller	31	G	5'11"	180	SR	Ocean Township, New Jersey	Graduated
Adam Comer	50	F	6'9"	220	SR	Spartanburg, South Carolina	Graduated

=== Incoming transfers ===
Charleston incoming transfers
Name	Number	Pos	Height	Weight	Year	Hometown	Previous school	Years remaining	Date eligible
Colby Duggan	2	F	6'7"	220	JR	Monson, Massachusetts	Campbell	2	October 1, 2025
Mister Dean	3	G	6'6"	200	SO	Miami, Florida	USC Upstate	3	October 1, 2025
Connor Hickman	10	G	6'3"	200	GS	Bloomington, Indiana	Cincinnati	1	October 1, 2025
Chol Machot	11	C	7'0"	190	SO	Melbourne, Australia	Florida SouthWestern	3	October 1, 2025
Will Mortimore	15	F	6'10"	220	SO	Maitland, Australia	Colorado Mesa	3	October 1, 2025
Kendall Taylor	23	G	6'5"	210	GS	Sacramento, California	Wingate	1	October 1, 2025
Christian Reeves	32	C	7'2"	255	JR	Charlotte, North Carolina	Clemson	2	October 1, 2025
Bryce Baker	55	G	6'5"	200	SR	Mooresville, North Carolina	Winthrop	1	October 1, 2025
Jlynn Counter	82	G	6'3"	195	GS	Oklahoma City, Oklahoma	Middle Tennessee	1	October 1, 2025

=== 2025 recruiting class ===
College recruiting
Name	Hometown	School	Height	Weight	Commit date
Chadlyn Traylor; PG	Huntersville, NC	North Mecklenburg HS	6 ft 2 in (1.88 m)	180 lb (82 kg)	Nov 13, 2024
Chadlyn Traylor; PG	Recruit ratings: Scout: Rivals: 247Sports: (0)				
AJ Fowler; G	Fayetteville, Arkansas	Jackson Hole HS	6 ft 4 in (1.93 m)	150 lb (68 kg)	May 4, 2025
AJ Fowler; G	Recruit ratings: Scout: Rivals: 247Sports: (0)				
Martin Kalu; G	Osnabrück, Germany	Löwen Braunschweig (Germany)	6 ft 5 in (1.96 m)	210 lb (95 kg)	Apr 23, 2025
Martin Kalu; G	Recruit ratings: Scout: Rivals: 247Sports: (0)				
Chris Davis Jr. G	Madison, Wisconsin	Sun Prairie HS	6 ft 4 in (1.93 m)	200 lb (91 kg)	Dec 5, 2025
Chris Davis Jr. G	Recruit ratings: Scout: Rivals: 247Sports: (0)				
Overall recruit ranking:
Note: In many cases, Scout, Rivals, 247Sports, On3, and ESPN may conflict in their listings of height and weight.; In these cases, the average was taken. ESPN grades are on a 100-point scale.; Sources: "2025 Team Ranking". Rivals.

== Roster ==
2025–26 College of Charleston Cougars men's basketball team
Players
Coaches

Pos.	#	Name	Height	Weight	Year	Previous school	Hometown
G	0	Jaxon Prunty	6 ft 6 in (1.98 m)	203 lb (92 kg)	RS Fr	Lexington HS	Lexington, SC
G	1	Chadlyn Traylor	6 ft 3 in (1.91 m)	170 lb (77 kg)	Fr	North Mecklenburg HS	Charlotte, NC
F	2	Colby Duggan	6 ft 7 in (2.01 m)	225 lb (102 kg)	Jr	Campbell	Monson, MA
G	3	Mister Dean	6 ft 6 in (1.98 m)	200 lb (91 kg)	So	USC Upstate	Miami, FL
G	4	Đorđe Ćurčić	6 ft 3 in (1.91 m)	190 lb (86 kg)	Jr	Saint Louis	Čačak, Serbia
G	5	Martin Kalu	6 ft 6 in (1.98 m)	210 lb (95 kg)	Fr	Löwen Braunschweig	Quakenbrück, Germany
G	6	Chris Davis Jr.	6 ft 4 in (1.93 m)	200 lb (91 kg)	Fr	Sun Prairie East HS	Madison, WI
G	7	AJ Fowler	6 ft 4 in (1.93 m)	150 lb (68 kg)	Fr	Jackson Hole HS	Fayetteville, AR
G	10	Connor Hickman	6 ft 3 in (1.91 m)	200 lb (91 kg)	GS	Cincinnati	Bloomington IN
C	11	Chol Machot	7 ft 0 in (2.13 m)	190 lb (86 kg)	RS So	Florida SouthWestern	Melbourne, Australia
F	15	Will Mortimore	6 ft 10 in (2.08 m)	220 lb (100 kg)	So	Colorado Mesa	Maitland, Australia
G	23	Kendall Taylor	6 ft 5 in (1.96 m)	210 lb (95 kg)	GS	Wingate	Sacramento, CA
C	32	Christian Reeves	7 ft 2 in (2.18 m)	255 lb (116 kg)	RS Jr	Clemson	Charlotte, NC
G	33	Joey Scarpitti	5 ft 11 in (1.8 m)	170 lb (77 kg)	So	St. Edward HS	Cleveland, OH
G	55	Bryce Baker	6 ft 5 in (1.96 m)	195 lb (88 kg)	Sr	Winthrop	Mooresville, NC
G	82	Jlynn Counter	6 ft 3 in (1.91 m)	205 lb (93 kg)	GS	Middle Tennessee	Oklahoma City, OK

Head coach

- Chris Mack (Xavier)

Assistant coach(es)

- Chris Harriman (Augusta State)
- Jeremy Growe (Indiana)
- Jeff McInnis (North Carolina)

Legend

- (C) Team captain
- (S) Suspended
- (I) Ineligible
- (W) Walk-on
- Injured
- Current redshirt

Roster
Last update: August 11. 2025

== Schedule and results ==
Date time, TV	Rank^{#}	Opponent^{#}	Result	Record	High points	High rebounds	High assists	Site (attendance) city, state
Non-conference regular season
November 3, 2025*; 7:00 p.m., FloHoops		Tusculum	W 79–58	1–0	14 – Tied	11 – Taylor	7 – Counter	TD Arena (5,122); Charleston, SC
November 7, 2025*; 6:00 p.m., ESPN+		at Liberty; Field of 68 Tip Off	L 75–90	1–1	22 – Kalu	9 – Machot	6 – Counter	Liberty Arena (3,998); Lynchburg, VA
November 8, 2025*; 6:00 p.m., ESPN+		vs. Florida Atlantic; Field of 68 Tip Off	L 77–94	1–2	22 – Counter	8 – Reeves	4 – Traylor	Liberty Arena (303); Lynchburg, VA
November 14, 2025*; 7:00 p.m., FloHoops		South Carolina State	W 88–61	2–2	12 – Tied	10 – Reeves	5 – Tied	TD Arena (5,241); Charleston, SC
November 17, 2025*; 7:00 p.m., FloHoops		Drake	L 62–71	2–3	21 – Counter	9 – Machot	3 – Dean	TD Arena (4,786); Charleston, SC
November 21, 2025*; 3:00 p.m., ESPN+		vs. UMass; Paradise Jam quarterfinals	W 69–65	3–3	12 – Counter	4 – Kalu	2 – Prunty	Sports and Fitness Center (1,224); Saint Thomas, USVI
November 23, 2025*; 5:30 p.m., ESPN+		vs. Yale; Paradise Jam semifinals	L 63–74	3–4	15 – Machot	6 – Machot	2 – Tied	Sports and Fitness Center; Saint Thomas, USVI
November 24, 2025*; 5:30 p.m., ESPN+		vs. Evansville; Paradise Jam 3rd place game	W 78–59	4–4	21 – Kalu	8 – Hickman	5 – Traylor	Sports and Fitness Center; Saint Thomas, USVI
November 30, 2025*; 3:30 p.m., FloHoops		Belmont	L 73–96	4–5	20 – Hickman	6 – Tied	6 – Counter	TD Arena (4,581); Charleston, SC
December 10, 2025*; 7:00 p.m., ESPN+		at South Florida	L 75–81	4–6	19 – Counter	6 – Reeves	3 – Tied	Yuengling Center (3,199); Tampa, FL
December 14, 2025*; 4:00 p.m., FloHoops		Charlotte	W 74–67	5–6	18 – Kalu	8 – Kalu	4 – Tied	TD Arena (4,969); Charleston, SC
December 17, 2025*; 7:00 p.m., FloHoops		The Citadel	W 82–78	6–6	22 – Counter	10 – Reeves	6 – Counter	TD Arena (4,763); Charleston, SC
December 21, 2025*; 12:00 p.m., ESPN+		at Northern Kentucky	W 85–74	7–6	26 – Counter	11 – Counter	6 – Counter	Truist Arena (2,828); Highland Heights, KY
CAA regular season
December 29, 2025; 7:00 p.m., FloHoops		Drexel	W 72–63	8–6 (1–0)	29 – Counter	7 – Reeves	6 – Counter	TD Arena (5,234); Charleston, SC
December 31, 2025; 2:00 p.m., FloHoops		at Elon	W 85–81	9–6 (2–0)	19 – Kalu	15 – Machot	9 – Counter	Schar Center; Elon, NC
January 5, 2026; 7:00 p.m., CBSSN		William & Mary	W 88–79	10–6 (3–0)	17 – Tied	10 – Tied	6 – Counter	TD Arena (4,862); Charleston, SC
January 10, 2026; 5:00 p.m., FloHoops		Hampton	W 74–70	11–6 (4–0)	22 – Duggan	7 – Machot	7 – Counter	TD Arena (4,875); Charleston, SC
January 15, 2026; 8:00 p.m., CBSSN		at Towson	L 52–61	11–7 (4–1)	20 – Hickman	13 – Machot	6 – Counter	TU Arena (1,850); Towson, MD
January 17, 2026; 4:00 p.m., FloHoops		at Stony Brook	L 106–112 ^{2OT}	11–8 (4–2)	28 – Counter	7 – Tied	6 – Tied	Stony Brook Arena (1,815); Stony Brook, NY
January 22, 2026; 7:00 p.m., FloHoops		Campbell	W 87–83	12–8 (5–2)	23 – Counter	9 – Reeves	9 – Counter	TD Arena (5,079); Charleston, SC
January 24, 2026; 12:00 p.m., FloHoops		Elon	W 80–70	13–8 (6–2)	29 – Reeves	18 – Reeves	6 – Counter	TD Arena (4,961); Charleston, SC
January 29, 2026; 7:00 p.m., FloHoops		at Hofstra	W 66–64	14–8 (7–2)	22 – Counter	13 – Reeves	5 – Counter	Mack Sports Complex (1,444); Hempstead, NY
January 31, 2026; 2:00 p.m., FloHoops		at Northeastern	W 89–84	15–8 (8–2)	28 – Counter	9 – Reeves	11 – Counter	Matthews Arena (912); Boston, MA
February 5, 2026; 7:00 p.m., FloHoops		North Carolina A&T	W 78–62	16–8 (9–2)	16 – Tied	7 – Kalu	6 – Counter	TD Arena (4,859); Charleston, SC
February 9, 2026; 8:00 p.m., CBSSN		UNC Wilmington	L 64–76	16–9 (9–3)	20 – Counter	11 – Reeves	3 – Counter	TD Arena (5,176); Charleston, SC
February 12, 2026; 7:00 p.m., FloHoops		Hofstra	L 62–66	16–10 (9–4)	14 – Tied	7 – Reeves	8 – Counter	TD Arena (4,611); Charleston, SC
February 15, 2026; 5:00 p.m., CBSSN		at Campbell	W 62–57	17–10 (10–4)	18 – Reeves	15 – Reeves	8 – Counter	Gore Arena (2,087); Buies Creek, NC
February 19, 2026; 7:00 p.m., FloHoops		at North Carolina A&T	W 74–61	18–10 (11–4)	16 – Counter	10 – Davis Jr.	7 – Counter	Corbett Sports Center (3,892); Greensboro, NC
February 21, 2026; 4:00 p.m., CBSSN		Monmouth	W 74–63	19–10 (12–4)	19 – Reeves	10 – Reeves	6 – Counter	TD Arena (5,048); Charleston, SC
February 26, 2026; 11:00 a.m., FloHoops		at Hampton	W 85–71	20–10 (13–4)	21 – Kalu	12 – Reeves	7 – Traylor	Hampton Convocation Center (1,017); Hampton, VA
March 1, 2026; 7:00 p.m., CBSSN		at UNC Wilmington	W 79–76	21–10 (14–4)	23 – Counter	6 – Reeves	7 – Counter	Trask Coliseum (5,220); Wilmington, NC
CAA tournament
March 8, 2026; 6:00 p.m., FloHoops	(2)	vs. (7) Towson; Quarterfinals	L 56–81	21–11	13 – Reeves	6 – Reeves	5 – Duggan	CareFirst Arena; Washington, D.C.
*Non-conference game. ^{#}Rankings from AP Poll. (#) Tournament seedings in parentheses. All times are in Eastern.

== Awards and honors ==
Conference honors
Honors	Player	Position
All-CAA First Team	Jlynn Counter	G
All-CAA Third Team	Christian Reeves	C
CAA Defensive Player of the Year	Chol Machot	C
CAA All-Defensive Team	Chol Machot	C
CAA All-Defensive Team	Christian Reeves	C
CAA All-Rookie Team	Chris Davis Jr.	G
