= Grace Preparatory Academy =

Location
- 3300 West Interstate 20; Arlington, Texas 76017; United States; 32.673435°N 97.159468°W

Information
- Type: Private school
- Established: 1992
- Principal: Susan Crosier
- Faculty: 92
- Grades: K-12
- Enrollment: 511 (2022-2023)
- Color
- Team name: Lions
- Website: Official Website

Grace Preparatory Academy (GPA) is a private, college-preparatory Christian school located in Arlington, Texas, United States. Founded in 1992, it offers programs for Kindergarten through Twelfth Grade students drawn from the Dallas–Fort Worth metroplex. It is the founding member of the National Association of University-Model Schools and is accredited by the Southern Association of Colleges and Schools.

== History ==
In the spring of 1992, a group of parents met to share their vision for a new model of education that blended the best of their individual public, private, and home-school model experiences. They incorporated the school on December 18, 1992; and held its first day of classes on August 16, 1993. In 2005, the National Association of University Model Schools (NAUMS) — which was founded as the outreach arm of GPA — became a separate entity, and GPA also became accredited with the Southern Association of Colleges and Schools (SACS).

== Educational model ==
GPA was the first to implement the educational model known as the University-Model School (UMS) which combines two elements of educational success, the professional classroom instruction of a teacher and the at-home mentoring of a parent, into a unified, college-like program. Students attend classes on campus two to three days per week, and instruction continues at home on the rest of the week.

== Athletics, academic competition and extracurricular ==
GPA secondary students compete with other non-public schools in athletic and academic events as a member of the Texas Association of Private and Parochial Schools. Athletic teams include Baseball, Boys' Basketball, Girls' Basketball, Cross Country, Track & Field, Football, Golf, and Volleyball. Academic teams compete in Academic/Speech, Art, and Music. Extracurricular organizations include: Cheerleading, Journalism, Spanish Club, Fellowship of Christian Athletes, and Robotics Club.

== Notable students ==
- Isaiah Austin, former center for the Baylor Bears and honorary pick in the 2014 NBA draft
- Jamal Branch, professional basketball player
- Tahj Chambers, professional football player for the Indianapolis Colts
- Justin Forsett, professional football player for the Denver Broncos
- Je'lon Hornbeak, professional basketball player for the Fort Wayne Mad Ants
- Jordan Mickey, professional basketball player for the Boston Celtics
- Emmanuel Mudiay, professional basketball player for the New York Knicks
- Mike Norvell, Florida State University football head coach
- Sadiel Rojas, professional basketball player for CB Murcia
