= Tahj Chambers =

American football player (born 2000)

No. 44 – Indianapolis Colts
- Position: Linebacker
- Roster status: Active

Personal information
- Born: April 9, 2000 (age 26); New Orleans, Louisiana, U.S.
- Listed height: 6 ft 2 in (1.88 m)
- Listed weight: 230 lb (104 kg)

Career information
- High school: Grace Preparatory Academy (Arlington, Texas)
- College: Missouri State (2020–2024); Ole Miss (2025)
- NFL draft: 2026: undrafted

Career history
- Indianapolis Colts (2026–present)

Awards and highlights
- Second-team All-MVFC (2024)
- Stats at Pro Football Reference

Tahj Joshua Chambers (born April 9, 2000) is an American professional football linebacker for the Indianapolis Colts of the National Football League (NFL). He played college football for the Missouri State Bears and Ole Miss Rebels.

== Early life ==
Chambers was born on April 9, 2000, in New Orleans, Louisiana. He attended Grace Preparatory Academy in Arlington, Texas. Chambers played linebacker and wide receiver, recording 65 tackles and 11 touchdowns in his senior year. He committed to play college football at Missouri State University.

== College career ==
Chambers played college football for the Missouri State Bears from 2020 to 2024 and Ole Miss Rebels in 2025. In five seasons, he played in 45 games, starting 28, where he made 199 tackles, including for 17 for loss, three sacks, two interceptions, eight pass deflections, two forced fumbles and one fumble recovery. Chambers earned second-team All-MVFC honors in 2024.

On December 20, 2024, Chambers committed to Ole Miss. In his lone season for the Rebels, he played in all 15 games and recorded 45 tackles and three pass deflections.

== Professional career ==
Pre-draft measurables
Height	Weight	Arm length	Hand span	Wingspan	40-yard dash	10-yard split	20-yard split	20-yard shuttle	Three-cone drill	Vertical jump	Broad jump	Bench press
6 ft 1 7/8 in (1.88 m)	231 lb (105 kg)	31 1/4 in (0.79 m)	8 7/8 in (0.23 m)	6 ft 6 3/4 in (2.00 m)	4.62 s	1.65 s	2.63 s	4.43 s	7.00 s	32.5 in (0.83 m)	9 ft 10 in (3.00 m)	16 reps
All values from Pro Day

After going undrafted in the 2026 NFL draft, Chambers signed with the Indianapolis Colts as an undrafted free agent.
