= 2024–25 Charleston Cougars men's basketball team =

American college basketball season

2024–25 Charleston Cougars men's basketball
- Conference: Coastal Athletic Association
- Record: 24–9 (13–5 CAA)
- Head coach: Chris Mack (1st season)
- Assistant coaches: Jeff McInnis; Jeremy Growe; Chris Harriman
- Home arena: TD Arena

2024–25 CAA men's basketball standings
	Conf.				Overall
Team	W		L	PCT	W		L	PCT
Towson	16	–	2	.889	22	–	11	.667
UNC Wilmington †	14	–	4	.778	27	–	8	.771
Charleston	13	–	5	.722	24	–	9	.727
William & Mary	11	–	7	.611	17	–	15	.531
Campbell	10	–	8	.556	15	–	17	.469
Monmouth	10	–	8	.556	13	–	20	.394
Northeastern	9	–	9	.500	17	–	15	.531
Drexel	9	–	9	.500	18	–	15	.545
Elon	8	–	10	.444	17	–	16	.515
Hampton	8	–	10	.444	17	–	16	.515
Hofstra	6	–	12	.333	15	–	18	.455
Delaware	5	–	13	.278	16	–	20	.444
Stony Brook	4	–	14	.222	8	–	24	.250
North Carolina A&T	3	–	15	.167	7	–	25	.219
† 2025 CAA tournament winner

The 2024–25 Charleston Cougars men's basketball team represented the College of Charleston in the 2024–25 NCAA Division I men's basketball season. They were led by first-year head coach Chris Mack. The team played its home games at TD Arena in Charleston, South Carolina, as a member of the Coastal Athletic Association. The Cougars finished the season 24–9, 13–5 in CAA play to finish in third place. They defeated Monmouth in the quarterfinals of the CAA tournament before losing to UNC Wilmington in the semifinals.

== Previous season ==
The Cougars, led by third-year head coach Pat Kelsey, finished the season 27–8, 15–3 in CAA play to win their second-straight regular season championship. The team defeated Monmouth, Towson, and Stony Brook in overtime to win their second-straight CAA tournament. They lost in the first round of the NCAA Tournament to Alabama, a team that went on to that year's Final Four.

After the season head coach Pat Kelsey left the program to coach at the University of Louisville, and Chris Mack was later hired as the 25th coach in Charleston history.

== Offseason ==
=== Departures ===
Charleston departures
Name	Number	Pos.	Height	Weight	Year	Hometown	Reason for departure
Jordan Crawford	0	G	6'2"	180	FR	Charlotte, North Carolina	Transferred to Eastern Kentucky
Frankie Policelli	1	F	6'9"	225	GS	New Hartford, New York	Graduated
Reyne Smith	2	G	6'2"	190	JR	Ulverstone, Tasmania	Transferred to Louisville
Khalil London	3	G	6'3"	185	FR	Wyandanch, New York	Transferred to Tennessee State
Bryce Butler	4	G	6'5"	205	GS	Latrobe, Pennsylvania	Graduated
Kobe Rodgers	11	G	6'3"	180	JR	Cincinnati, Ohio	Transferred to Louisville
Ben Burnham	13	F	6'7"	220	JR	Fort Mill, South Carolina	Transferred to Virginia Tech
Mayar Wol	15	F	6'8"	185	FR	Raleigh, North Carolina	Transferred to Eastern Kentucky
James Scott	23	F	6'11"	210	FR	Fayetteville, North Carolina	Transferred to Louisville

=== Incoming transfers ===
Mack's new coaching staff quickly made use of the transfer portal and signed Derrin Boyd, a graduate student from Lipscomb who led his team with 17.6 points per game last season, earning an All-ASUN Second Team selection. Two sophomores who had previously played for the Serbian U-19 National Team then committed to Charleston, Đorđe Ćurčić from Saint Louis and Lazar Đjoković from Xavier, reuniting on the court for the first time since the 2023 U-19 World Cup. Another international player, Stef van Bussel, signed to the Cougars after playing for the Netherlands National U-18 and U-16 Teams, the Bayer Giants Leverkusen of the German pro league, and the Saint Louis Billikens. That same day another sophomore, Deywilk Tavarez, transferred in from Delaware State after averaging 17.0 points per game as a freshman and winning MEAC Rookie of the Year. The coaching staff then signed AJ Smith, a junior from The Citadel, who led Charleston's crosstown-rival in scoring with 16.2 points per game last season. The transfer class was finalized with the addition of senior Elijah Jones, who led Green Bay in rebounding last season and won the NJCAA National Championship in 2023.

Charleston incoming transfers
Name	Number	Pos	Height	Weight	Year	Hometown	Previous school	Years remaining	Date eligible
AJ Smith	1	G	6'4"	215	JR	Charlotte, North Carolina	The Citadel	2	October 1, 2024
Elijah Jones	3	F	6'7"	n/a	SR	South Holland, Illinois	Green Bay	1	October 1, 2024
Derrin Boyd	4	G	6'3"	210	GS	Princeton, Kentucky	Lipscomb	1	October 1, 2024
Deywilk Tavarez	5	G	6'2"	n/a	SO	Pennsauken, New Jersey	Delaware State	3	October 1, 2024
Stef van Bussel	15	C	6'10"	255	SO	Ommel, Netherlands	Saint Louis	3	October 1, 2024
Lazar Đjoković	17	F	6'10"	230	SO	Gornji Milanovac, Serbia	Xavier	3	October 1, 2024
Đorđe Ćurčić	44	G	6'2"	185	SO	Čačak, Serbia	Saint Louis	3	October 1, 2024

=== 2024 recruiting class ===
College recruiting information
Name	Hometown	School	Height	Weight	Commit date
Joey Scarpitti; G	Lakewood, OH	St. Edward (OH)	5 ft 11 in (1.80 m)	160 lb (73 kg)	Apr 25, 2024
Joey Scarpitti; G	Recruit ratings: Scout: Rivals: 247Sports: (0)				
Justas Stonkus; G	Plungė, Lithuania	BC Žalgiris-2	6 ft 6 in (1.98 m)	195 lb (88 kg)	Apr 26, 2024
Justas Stonkus; G	Recruit ratings: Scout: Rivals: 247Sports: (0)				
Jaxon Prunty; SF	Lexington, SC	Lexington High School	6 ft 6 in (1.98 m)	170 lb (77 kg)	May 2, 2024
Jaxon Prunty; SF	Recruit ratings: Scout: Rivals: 247Sports: (78)				
Overall recruit ranking:
Note: In many cases, Scout, Rivals, 247Sports, On3, and ESPN may conflict in their listings of height and weight.; In these cases, the average was taken. ESPN grades are on a 100-point scale.; Sources: "2024 Team Ranking". Rivals.

== Preseason ==
In the conference's preseason poll, the Cougars were picked to finish in second place.

Despite the change in head coach, 2024 First Team All-CAA member Ante Brzovic decided to return for his senior season, as did Irish National Team guard CJ Fulton.

== Roster ==
2024–25 College of Charleston Cougars men's basketball team
Players
Coaches

Pos.	#	Name	Height	Weight	Year	Previous school	Hometown
G	0	Jaxon Prunty	6 ft 6 in (1.98 m)	170 lb (77 kg)	Fr	Lexington HS	Lexington, SC
G	1	AJ Smith	6 ft 5 in (1.96 m)	210 lb (95 kg)	Jr	The Citadel	Charlotte, NC
F	3	Elijah Jones	6 ft 7 in (2.01 m)	210 lb (95 kg)	Sr	Green Bay	South Holland, IL
G	4	Derrin Boyd	6 ft 3 in (1.91 m)	210 lb (95 kg)	Sr	Lipscomb	Princeton, KY
G	5	Deywilk Tavarez	6 ft 3 in (1.91 m)	190 lb (86 kg)	So	Delaware State	Pennsauken, NJ
G	6	CJ Fulton	6 ft 3 in (1.91 m)	190 lb (86 kg)	Sr	Lafayette	Belfast, Northern Ireland
G	7	Evan Kilminster	6 ft 1 in (1.85 m)	180 lb (82 kg)	RS So	Australian Institute of Sport	Newcastle, Australia
G	8	Justas Stonkus	6 ft 6 in (1.98 m)	210 lb (95 kg)	Fr	BC Žalgiris-2	Plungė, Lithuania
F	10	Ante Brzovic	6 ft 10 in (2.08 m)	225 lb (102 kg)	Sr	Southeastern Oklahoma State	Zagreb, Croatia
G	14	Cade Higgins	6 ft 4 in (1.93 m)	195 lb (88 kg)	Fr	IMG Academy	Fort Worth, TX
C	15	Stef van Bussel	6 ft 10 in (2.08 m)	250 lb (113 kg)	So	Saint Louis	Asten, Netherlands
F	17	Lazar Đjoković	6 ft 10 in (2.08 m)	230 lb (104 kg)	So	Xavier	Gornji Milanovac, Serbia
G	31	Jack Miller	5 ft 11 in (1.8 m)	180 lb (82 kg)	Sr	Ocean Township HS	Ocean Township, NJ
G	33	Joey Scarpitti	6 ft 0 in (1.83 m)	170 lb (77 kg)	Fr	St. Edward HS	Cleveland, OH
G	44	Đorđe Ćurčić	6 ft 3 in (1.91 m)	185 lb (84 kg)	So	Saint Louis	Čačak, Serbia
F	50	Adam Comer	6 ft 9 in (2.06 m)	220 lb (100 kg)	Sr	Broome HS	Spartanburg, SC

Head coach

- Chris Mack (Xavier)

Assistant coach(es)

- Chris Harriman (Augusta State)
- Jeremy Growe (Indiana)
- Jeff McInnis (North Carolina)

Legend

- (C) Team captain
- (S) Suspended
- (I) Ineligible
- (W) Walk-on
- Injured
- Current redshirt

Roster
Last update: September 4. 2024

== Schedule and results ==
Date time, TV	Rank^{#}	Opponent^{#}	Result	Record	High points	High rebounds	High assists	Site (attendance) city, state
Non-conference regular season
November 4, 2024*; 12:00 pm, YouTube		vs. Southern Illinois; Field of 68 Opening Day Showcase	W 90–80	1−0	27 – Brzovic	9 – Brzovic	7 – Fulton	Sanford Pentagon (2,300); Sioux Falls, SD
November 8, 2024*; 7:00 pm, FloHoops		South Florida	W 86–71	2−0	34 – Brzovic	9 – Brzovic	6 – Fulton	TD Arena (5,457); Charleston, SC
November 15, 2024*; 7:00 pm, YouTube		Florida Atlantic; Field of 68 Tip-Off	W 119–116 ^{2OT}	3−0	39 – Brzovic	13 – Brzovic	6 – Tied	TD Arena (4,963); Charleston, SC
November 17, 2024*; 4:00 pm, YouTube		Liberty; Field of 68 Tip-Off	L 47–68	3−1	15 – Đjoković	8 – Đjoković	4 – Fulton	TD Arena (4,858); Charleston, SC
November 20, 2024*; 6:00 pm, ESPN+		at The Citadel; Rivalry	W 76–61	4−1	22 – Brzovic	14 – Brzovic	6 – Brzovic	McAlister Field House (3,231); Charleston, SC
November 24, 2024*; 1:00 pm, ESPN+		at Rhode Island	L 53–91	4–2	10 – Smith	6 – Brzovic	4 – Boyd	Ryan Center (3,778); Kingston, RI
November 27, 2024*; 1:00 pm, FloHoops		Northern Kentucky	W 79–64	5–2	22 – Boyd	13 – Brzovic	6 – Tied	TD Arena (4,718); Charleston, SC
December 3, 2024*; 7:00 pm, FloHoops		Tusculum	W 94–71	6–2	17 – Đjoković	6 – Smith	7 – Fulton	TD Arena (4,388); Charleston, SC
December 10, 2024*; 7:00 pm, ESPN+		at Saint Joseph's	W 78–75	7–2	18 – Smith	5 – Tied	9 – Fulton	Hagan Arena (2,062); Philadelphia, PA
December 16, 2024*; 7:00 pm, FloHoops		Wofford	W 77–67	8–2	21 – Brzovic	7 – Brzovic	8 – Fulton	TD Arena (4,748); Charleston, SC
December 22, 2024*; 3:00 pm, ESPNU		vs. Oregon State; Diamond Head Classic Quarterfinals	L 65–74	8–3	13 – Tied	8 – Đjoković	4 – Fulton	Stan Sheriff Center; Honolulu, HI
December 23, 2024*; 5:30 pm, ESPNU		vs. Loyola Chicago; Diamond Head Classic Consolation 2nd Round	W 77–68	9–3	30 – Tavarez	6 – Brzovic	5 – Brzovic	Stan Sheriff Center; Honolulu, HI
December 25, 2024*; 3:30 pm, ESPNU		vs. Charlotte; Diamond Head Classic 5th Place Game	W 84–81	10–3	32 – Brzovic	14 – Brzovic	7 – Fulton	Stan Sheriff Center (4,163); Honolulu, HI
CAA regular season
January 2, 2025; 7:00 pm, FloHoops		Hampton	W 94–67	11–3 (1–0)	26 – Boyd	9 – Brzovic	6 – Tavarez	TD Arena (5,070); Charleston, SC
January 4, 2025; 2:00 pm, FloHoops		Towson	W 77–69	12–3 (2–0)	20 – Tied	11 – Brzovic	5 – Tied	TD Arena (5,116); Charleston, SC
January 9, 2025; 7:00 pm, FloHoops		at Hofstra	W 67–61	13–3 (3–0)	23 – Brzovic	11 – Brzovic	12 – Fulton	Mack Sports Complex (1,504); Hempstead, NY
January 11, 2025; 2:00 pm, FloHoops		at Monmouth	L 73–84	13–4 (3–1)	20 – Tavarez	9 – Tavarez	7 – Fulton	OceanFirst Bank Center (1,904); West Long Branch, NJ
January 16, 2025; 7:00 pm, FloHoops		at Campbell	W 67–61	14–4 (4–1)	15 – Tied	15 – Đjoković	6 – Fulton	Gore Arena (1,359); Buies Creek, NC
January 18, 2025; 5:00 pm, FloHoops		Northeastern	W 87–85	15−4 (5−1)	32 – Tavarez	9 – Brzovic	6 – Fulton	TD Arena (5,132); Charleston, SC
January 23, 2025; 7:00 pm, FloHoops		UNC Wilmington	L 83–85	15−5 (5−2)	24 – Boyd	9 – Đjoković	9 – Fulton	TD Arena (5,090); Charleston, SC
January 25, 2025; 7:00 pm, FloHoops		at Elon	W 78–62	16−5 (6−2)	20 – Smith	12 – Brzovic	5 – Brzovic	Schar Center (2,657); Elon, NC
January 30, 2025; 6:00 pm, CBSSN		Stony Brook	W 81–74	17−5 (7−2)	25 – Tied	11 – Fulton	11 – Fulton	TD Arena (4,727); Charleston, SC
February 3, 2025; 8:00 pm, CBSSN		at William & Mary	L 75–90	17−6 (7−3)	20 – Brzovic	11 – Đjoković	6 – Fulton	Kaplan Arena (3,461); Williamsburg, VA
February 6, 2025; 6:00 pm, CBSSN		North Carolina A&T	W 66–63	18−6 (8−3)	24 – Brzovic	9 – Brzovic	8 – Fulton	TD Arena (4,600); Charleston, SC
February 8, 2025; 6:00 pm, FloHoops		Elon	W 88–83 ^{OT}	19–6 (9–3)	27 – Brzovic	10 – Tied	5 – Tied	TD Arena (5,007); Charleston, SC
February 13, 2025; 7:00 pm, CBSSN		at UNC Wilmington	L 66–86	19–7 (9–4)	14 – Smith	8 – Brzovic	6 – Fulton	Trask Coliseum (5,200); Wilmington, NC
February 15, 2025; 6:00 pm, FloHoops		at North Carolina A&T	W 69–59	20–7 (10–4)	20 – Tavarez	6 – Brzovic	11 – Fulton	Corbett Sports Center (1,201); Greensboro, NC
February 20, 2025; 7:00 pm, FloHoops		at Northeastern	W 73–62	21–7 (11–4)	20 – Brzovic	11 – Tavarez	6 – Fulton	Matthews Arena (1,227); Boston, MA
February 22, 2025; 12:00 pm, CBSSN		at Drexel	L 55–64	21–8 (11–5)	16 – Brzovic	6 – Brzovic	4 – Tied	Daskalakis Athletic Center (1,723); Philadelphia, PA
February 27, 2025; 7:00 pm, FloHoops		Delaware	W 94–84	22–8 (12–5)	27 – Brzovic	9 – Đjoković	10 – Fulton	TD Arena (4,939); Charleston, SC
March 1, 2025; 6:00 pm, FloHoops		Campbell	W 87–65	23–8 (13–5)	25 – Boyd	8 – Tied	10 – Fulton	TD Arena (5,165); Charleston, SC
CAA tournament
March 9, 2025; 8:30 pm, FloHoops	(3)	vs. (6) Monmouth; Quarterfinals	W 79–78 ^{OT}	24–8	22 – Brzovic	8 – Tied	5 – Fulton	CareFirst Arena (2,580); Washington, D.C.
March 10, 2025; 8:30 pm, CBSSN	(3)	vs. (2) UNC Wilmington; Semifinals	L 67–68	24–9	18 – Boyd	11 – Đjoković	5 – Fulton	CareFirst Arena (2,367); Washington, D.C.
*Non-conference game. ^{#}Rankings from AP Poll. (#) Tournament seedings in parentheses. All times are in Eastern.

== Awards and honors ==
Conference honors
Honors	Player	Position
All-CAA First Team	Ante Brzovic	F
All-CAA Third Team	Derrin Boyd	G
All-CAA Third Team	CJ Fulton	G
CAA All-Rookie Team	Justas Stonkus	G
CAA Scholar Athlete of the Year	CJ Fulton	G
