= 2024–25 Monmouth Hawks men's basketball team =

American college basketball season

2024–25 Monmouth Hawks men's basketball
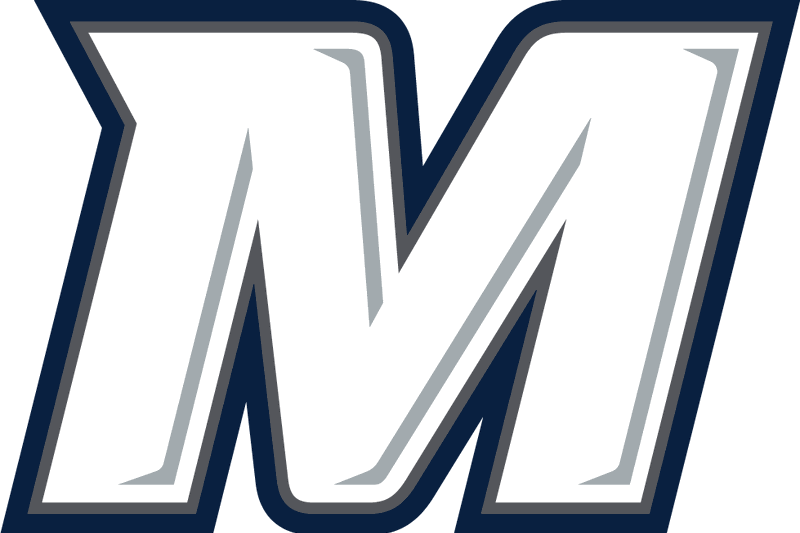
- Conference: Coastal Athletic Association
- Record: 13–20 (10–8 CAA)
- Head coach: King Rice (14th season)
- Assistant coaches: Rick Callahan; Brian Reese; Clive Bentick; Micah Seaborn; Je'lon Hornbeak
- Home arena: OceanFirst Bank Center

2024–25 CAA men's basketball standings
	Conf.				Overall
Team	W		L	PCT	W		L	PCT
Towson	16	–	2	.889	22	–	11	.667
UNC Wilmington †	14	–	4	.778	27	–	8	.771
Charleston	13	–	5	.722	24	–	9	.727
William & Mary	11	–	7	.611	17	–	15	.531
Campbell	10	–	8	.556	15	–	17	.469
Monmouth	10	–	8	.556	13	–	20	.394
Northeastern	9	–	9	.500	17	–	15	.531
Drexel	9	–	9	.500	18	–	15	.545
Elon	8	–	10	.444	17	–	16	.515
Hampton	8	–	10	.444	17	–	16	.515
Hofstra	6	–	12	.333	15	–	18	.455
Delaware	5	–	13	.278	16	–	20	.444
Stony Brook	4	–	14	.222	8	–	24	.250
North Carolina A&T	3	–	15	.167	7	–	25	.219
† 2025 CAA tournament winner

The 2024–25 Monmouth Hawks men's basketball team represented Monmouth University during the 2024–25 NCAA Division I men's basketball season. The Hawks, led by 14th-year head coach King Rice, played their home games at OceanFirst Bank Center in West Long Branch, New Jersey as members of the Coastal Athletic Association (CAA).

== Previous season ==
The Hawks finished the 2023–24 season 18–15, 10–8 in CAA play, to finish in a three-way tie for sixth place. They defeated Campbell, before falling to top-seeded and eventual tournament champions Charleston in the quarterfinals of the CAA tournament.

== Roster ==
2024–25 Monmouth Hawks men's basketball team
Players
Coaches

Pos.	#	Name	Height	Weight	Year	Previous school	Hometown
C	0	Dok Muordar	7 ft 1 in (2.16 m)	195 lb (88 kg)	Jr	Cleveland State	Rumbek, South Sudan
G	1	Abdi Jr. Bashir	6 ft 7 in (2.01 m)	160 lb (73 kg)	So	PHHoenix Prep	Omaha, NE
F	2	Jaret Valencia	6 ft 9 in (2.06 m)	190 lb (86 kg)	RS So	Legacy SSS	Quibdó, Colombia
G	3	Madison Durr	6 ft 5 in (1.96 m)	195 lb (88 kg)	Jr	The Citadel	Atlanta, GA
G	4	Andrew Ball	6 ft 9 in (2.06 m)	215 lb (98 kg)	RS So	Shawnee High School	Marlton, NJ
G	5	Corey Miller	6 ft 2 in (1.88 m)	180 lb (82 kg)	So	The Pennington School	Ocean Township, NJ
F	6	Jordan Meka	6 ft 8 in (2.03 m)	225 lb (102 kg)	GS	Georgia Tech	Yaoundé, Cameroon
G	7	Justin Ray	6 ft 3 in (1.91 m)	175 lb (79 kg)	Fr	Eastside High School	Greer, SC
G	8	Chris Green	5 ft 11 in (1.8 m)	190 lb (86 kg)	So	Nyack College	Brooklyn, NY
G	9	Lucas Orchard	6 ft 3 in (1.91 m)	195 lb (88 kg)	Fr	Perkiomen School	Wayne, PA
G	10	Jack Leahy	6 ft 5 in (1.96 m)	205 lb (93 kg)	So	Wyoming Seminary	Long Branch, NJ
G	11	Aric Demings	6 ft 1 in (1.85 m)	180 lb (82 kg)	So	Utah Tech	DeSoto, TX
G	13	Jack Collins	6 ft 5 in (1.96 m)	205 lb (93 kg)	Jr	The Phelps School	Manasquan, NJ
F	21	Chris Morgan	6 ft 9 in (2.06 m)	245 lb (111 kg)	Sr	North Texas	Grand Prairie, TX
F	23	Cornelius Jr. Robinson	6 ft 7 in (2.01 m)	225 lb (102 kg)	So	Camden High School	Willingboro, NJ
G	30	Sam Fagan	6 ft 1 in (1.85 m)	190 lb (86 kg)	Sr	Neptune High School	Lake Como, NJ
F	42	Quinn Peters	6 ft 6 in (1.98 m)	205 lb (93 kg)	So	Manasquan High School	Spring Lake Heights, NJ
C	99	Tadhg Crowley	6 ft 10 in (2.08 m)	270 lb (122 kg)	Sr	Trinity-Pawling School	Yonkers, NY

Head coach

- King Rice (North Carolina)

Assistant coach(es)

- Rick Callahan (Salem)
- Brian Reese (North Carolina)
- Clive Bentick (Canisius)
- Micah Seaborn (Monmouth)
- Je'lon Hornbeak (Monmouth)

Legend

- (C) Team captain
- (S) Suspended
- (I) Ineligible
- (W) Walk-on
- Injured
- Current redshirt

Roster
Last update: November 1, 2024

== Schedule and results ==
Date time, TV	Rank^{#}	Opponent^{#}	Result	Record	Site (attendance) city, state
Exhibition
October 25, 2024*; 7:00 p.m.		Rhode Island College	W 95–65	–	OceanFirst Bank Center (520); West Long Branch, NJ
Non-conference regular season
November 4, 2024*; 7:00 p.m., BTN+		at Michigan State	L 57–81	0–1	Breslin Center (14,797); East Lansing, MI
November 8, 2024*; 6:00 p.m., JerseyJam.net		vs. Temple; Jersey Jam	L 74–103	0–2	CURE Insurance Arena (2,247); Trenton, NJ
November 12, 2024*; 7:00 p.m., ESPN+		at Northern Illinois	L 66–79	0–3	Convocation Center (1,033); DeKalb, IL
November 15, 2024*; 6:30 p.m., BTN		at No. 24 Rutgers	L 81–98	0–4	Jersey Mike's Arena (8,000); Piscataway, NJ
November 18, 2024*; 7:30 p.m., ESPN+		at Wichita State	L 66–70	0–5	Charles Koch Arena (5,582); Wichita, KS
November 21, 2024*; 5:00 p.m.		vs. Youngstown State; Axe 'Em Classic	L 62–72	0–6	William R. Johnson Coliseum (117); Nacogdoches, TX
November 22, 2024*; 6:00 p.m., ESPN+		at Stephen F. Austin; Axe 'Em Classic	L 67–72	0–7	William R. Johnson Coliseum (1,438); Nacogdoches, TX
November 23, 2024*; 12:00 p.m.		vs. Presbyterian; Axe 'Em Classic	L 61–71	0–8	William R. Johnson Coliseum (103); Nacogdoches, TX
November 30, 2024*; 12:00 p.m., FS2		at Seton Hall	W 63–51	1–8	Prudential Center (8,606); Newark, NJ
December 4, 2024*; 7:00 p.m., ESPN+		at Lehigh	L 63–90	1–9	Stabler Arena (473); Bethlehem, PA
December 10, 2024*; 7:00 p.m., ESPN+		at Princeton	L 67–71	1–10	Jadwin Gymnasium (1,523); Princeton, NJ
December 21, 2024*; 1:00 p.m., FloHoops		Fairfield	W 88–74	2–10	OceanFirst Bank Center (1,804); West Long Branch, NJ
December 30, 2024*; 6:30 p.m., SECN+		at No. 2 Auburn	L 58–87	2–11	Neville Arena (9,121); Auburn, AL
CAA regular season
January 2, 2025; 7:00 p.m., FloHoops		Stony Brook	W 78–56	3–11 (1–0)	OceanFirst Bank Center (1,310); West Long Branch, NJ
January 4, 2025; 4:00 p.m., FloHoops		at Delaware	L 64–84	3–12 (1–1)	Bob Carpenter Center (1,981); Newark, DE
January 9, 2025; 7:00 p.m., FloHoops		UNC Wilmington	L 55–64	3–13 (1–2)	OceanFirst Bank Center (1,238); West Long Branch, NJ
January 11, 2025; 2:00 p.m., FloHoops		Charleston	W 84–73	4–13 (2–2)	OceanFirst Bank Center (1,904); West Long Branch, NJ
January 16, 2025; 7:00 p.m., FloHoops		at North Carolina A&T	W 72–63	5–13 (3–2)	Corbett Sports Center (2,858); Greensboro, NC
January 18, 2025; 2:00 p.m., FloHoops		at Campbell	L 58–81	5–14 (3–3)	Gore Arena (1,615); Buies Creek, NC
January 23, 2025; 7:00 p.m., FloHoops		at Elon	L 71–83	5–15 (3–4)	Schar Center (2,078); Elon, NC
January 25, 2025; 2:00 p.m., FloHoops		at William & Mary	L 73–78	5–16 (3–5)	Kaplan Arena (4,688); Williamsburg, VA
January 30, 2025; 7:00 p.m., FloHoops		Drexel	W 104–97 ^{2OT}	6–16 (4–5)	OceanFirst Bank Center (1,724); West Long Branch, NJ
February 1, 2025; 2:00 p.m., FloHoops		Delaware	W 92–83	7–16 (5–5)	OceanFirst Bank Center (2,586); West Long Branch, NJ
February 6, 2025; 7:00 p.m., FloHoops		Hampton	W 68–63	8–16 (6–5)	OceanFirst Bank Center (1,929); West Long Branch, NJ
February 8, 2025; 4:00 p.m., CBSSN		Towson	L 67–73	8–17 (6–6)	OceanFirst Bank Center (2,756); West Long Branch, NJ
February 13, 2025; 5:00 p.m., CBSSN		at Stony Brook	W 79–69	9–17 (7–6)	Stony Brook Arena (1,428); Stony Brook, NY
February 15, 2025; 2:00 p.m., FloHoops		at Towson	L 54–80	9–18 (7–7)	TU Arena (3,104); Towson, MD
February 20, 2025; 7:00 p.m., CBSSN		at Hofstra	W 68–62	10–18 (8–7)	Mack Sports Complex (1,460); Hempstead, NY
February 24, 2025; 7:00 p.m., CBSSN		Northeastern	W 78–73	11–18 (9–7)	OceanFirst Bank Center (1,862); West Long Branch, NJ
February 27, 2025; 7:00 p.m., FloHoops		Elon	W 79–76	12–18 (10–7)	OceanFirst Bank Center (2,102); West Long Branch, NJ
March 1, 2025; 2:00 p.m., FloHoops		at Drexel	L 61–71	12–19 (10–8)	Daskalakis Athletic Center (1,193); Philadelphia, PA
CAA tournament
March 8, 2025; 8:30 p.m., FloHoops	(6)	vs. (11) Hofstra; Second round	W 65–60	13–19	CareFirst Arena (2,556); Washington, D.C.
March 9, 2025; 8:30 p.m., FloHoops	(6)	vs. (3) Charleston; Quarterfinals	L 78–79 ^{OT}	13–20	CareFirst Arena (2,580); Washington, D.C.
*Non-conference game. ^{#}Rankings from AP poll. (#) Tournament seedings in parentheses. All times are in Eastern.
