= Deywilk Tavarez =

American basketball player (born 2004)

Hofstra Pride
- Position: Point guard
- League: Coastal Athletic Association

Personal information
- Born: August 27, 2004 (age 22) Pennsauken, New Jersey
- Listed height: 6 ft 2 in (1.88 m)
- Listed weight: 185 lb (84 kg)

Career information
- High school: Academy of the New Church (Bryn Athyn, Pennsylvania)
- College: Delaware State (2023–2024); Charleston (2024–2025); Loyola Chicago (2025–2026); Hofstra (2026–present)

Career highlights
- MEAC Rookie of the Year (2024); Third-team All-MEAC (2024); MEAC All-Rookie Team (2024)

Deywilk Tavarez (born August 27, 2004) is a Dominican American college basketball player for the Hofstra Pride. He previously played for the Loyola Ramblers, Charleston Cougars and the Delaware State Hornets.

== Early life and high school career ==
Tavarez is of Dominican descent. He grew up in Pennsauken, New Jersey, and attended the Academy of the New Church in Bryn Athyn, Pennsylvania. While playing for the varsity team, he tore his left and right meniscus during both his sophomore and junior seasons. As a senior, Tavarez led his team in scoring, rebounds, assists and steals after he averaged 19.5 points, 6.8 rebounds, 3.5 steals, and 4.7 assists per game through 24 games. To bolster his recruitment chances he played in front of scouts in the Amateur Athletic Union, where Delaware State head coach Stan Waterman first discovered him.

== College career ==
=== Delaware State ===
Tavarez quickly made an impact for the Hornets, making his way into the starting lineup of 30 out of 33 games during the 2023–24 season. On March 2, 2024, he led the Hornets to an 85–71 victory over Norfolk State, scoring a career-high 31 points and dishing out a career-high 10 assists for his first collegiate double-double. Through the season Tavarez averaged 13.7 points, 3.6 assists, and 3.4 rebounds per game, and led the Hornets with 116 total assists. After earning five separate Rookie of the Week distinctions during the regular season, Tavarez was named MEAC Rookie of the Year, and earned spots on the All-MEAC Third Team and All-Rookie Team.

=== Charleston ===
On April 15, 2024, Tavarez entered the transfer portal. On April 30, Tavarez officially signed to play for the Charleston Cougars under the program's new head coach, Chris Mack.

During the 2024 Diamond Head Classic Tavarez averaged 22.5 points, 4.5 rebounds, and 2.0 assists to lead the Cougars to victories over Loyola Chicago and Charlotte. After these performances he was named to the Diamond Head Classic All-Tournament Team, and earned his first CAA Player of the Week distinction. On January 18, 2025, Tavarez scored a career-high 32 points in an 87–85 victory over Northeastern, earning him his second CAA Player of the Week selection. Tavarez suffered an undisclosed foot injury in late January, causing him to miss six games. He finished the season averaging 12.9 points, 3.6 rebounds, and 2.5 assists across 27 games.

=== Loyola Chicago ===
On April 13, 2025, Tavarez announced that he would be transferring to play for the Loyola Chicago Ramblers. The 2025–26 Ramblers finished the season with a 9–24 record, good for last place in the Atlantic 10, as Tavarez averaged 8.9 points, 2.3 rebounds, and 1.8 assists per game across 33 games.

=== Hofstra ===
After entering the transfer portal for a third time, Tavarez signed to play for the Hofstra Pride on June 29, 2026.

== Career statistics ==
Legend
GP	Games played	GS	Games started	MPG	Minutes per game
FG%	Field goal percentage	3P%	3-point field goal percentage	FT%	Free throw percentage
RPG	Rebounds per game	APG	Assists per game	SPG	Steals per game
BPG	Blocks per game	PPG	Points per game	**Bold**	Career high

=== College ===
Year	Team	GP	GS	MPG	FG%	3P%	FT%	RPG	APG	SPG	BPG	PPG
2023–24	Delaware State	**33**	**30**	**30.9**	.396	.362	.769	3.4	**3.6**	**2.0**	0.0	**13.7**
2024–25	Charleston	27	23	27.5	**.413**	**.415**	.681	**3.6**	2.5	1.1	0.0	12.9
2025–26	Loyola	**33**	17	22.8	.343	.314	**.886**	2.3	1.8	0.6	**0.1**	8.9
Career		93	70	27.0	.386	.359	.764	3.1	2.6	1.2	0.0	11.8
