= 2024–25 Drexel Dragons men's basketball team =

American college basketball season

2024–25 Drexel Dragons men's basketball
- Conference: Coastal Athletic Association
- Record: 18–15 (9–9 CAA)
- Head coach: Zach Spiker (9th season)
- Assistant coaches: Paul Fortier (9th season); Will Chavis (4th season); Frantz Massenat (2nd season)
- Home arena: Daskalakis Athletic Center

2024–25 CAA men's basketball standings
	Conf.				Overall
Team	W		L	PCT	W		L	PCT
Towson	16	–	2	.889	22	–	11	.667
UNC Wilmington †	14	–	4	.778	27	–	8	.771
Charleston	13	–	5	.722	24	–	9	.727
William & Mary	11	–	7	.611	17	–	15	.531
Campbell	10	–	8	.556	15	–	17	.469
Monmouth	10	–	8	.556	13	–	20	.394
Northeastern	9	–	9	.500	17	–	15	.531
Drexel	9	–	9	.500	18	–	15	.545
Elon	8	–	10	.444	17	–	16	.515
Hampton	8	–	10	.444	17	–	16	.515
Hofstra	6	–	12	.333	15	–	18	.455
Delaware	5	–	13	.278	16	–	20	.444
Stony Brook	4	–	14	.222	8	–	24	.250
North Carolina A&T	3	–	15	.167	7	–	25	.219
† 2025 CAA tournament winner

The 2024–25 Drexel Dragons men's basketball team represented Drexel University during the 2024–25 NCAA Division I men's basketball season. The Dragons, led by ninth-year head coach Zach Spiker, played their home games at the Daskalakis Athletic Center in Philadelphia, Pennsylvania as members of the Coastal Athletic Association (CAA).

== Previous season ==
The Dragons finished the 2023–24 season 20–12, 13–5 in CAA play, to finish in second place. They lost to Stony Brook in the CAA tournament quarterfinals.

== Offseason ==
=== Departures ===
Name	Number	Pos.	Height	Weight	Year	Hometown	Notes
Lamar Oden Jr	1	G/F	6' 6"	215	Senior	Douglasville, GA	Transferred to Charleston Southern
Lucas Monroe	2	G	6' 6"	200	RS Senior	Abington, PA	Graduated
Jamie Bergens	3	G	6' 2"	185	Senior	Almere, Netherlands	Transferred to Fairfield
Justin Moore	11	G	6' 3"	170	Sophomore	Philadelphia, PA	Transferred to Loyola
Dean Wang	12	G	6' 1"	190	Senior	Philadelphia, PA	Graduated
Luke House	14	F	6' 4"	210	6th-year senior	Norristown, PA	Graduated
Mate Okros	21	F	6' 6"	215	6th-year senior	Debrecen, Hungary	Graduated
Hubert Bayigamba	20	G	6' 2"	182	Senior	Gaithersburg, MD	Transferred to Ellsworth Community College
Amari Williams	22	C	6' 10"	250	Senior	Nottingham, England	Transferred to Kentucky
Maximus Fuentes	30	G	6' 3"	180	Junior	Boca Raton, FL	Transferred to Jacksonville

=== Incoming transfers ===
College recruiting information
Name	Hometown	School	Height	Weight	Commit date
Kevon Vanderhorst; G	Raleigh, NC	Brunswick Community College	6 ft 3 in (1.91 m)	N/A	Apr 22, 2024
Kevon Vanderhorst; G	Recruit ratings: No ratings found				
Victor Panov; PF	Saint Petersburg, Russia	Daytona State College	6 ft 7 in (2.01 m)	225 lb (102 kg)	Apr 26, 2024
Victor Panov; PF	Recruit ratings: No ratings found				
Jason Drake; G	Southfield, MI	Butler Community College	6 ft 2 in (1.88 m)	188 lb (85 kg)	Jun 18, 2024
Jason Drake; G	Recruit ratings: 247Sports: ESPN:				
Villiam Garcia Adsten; G	Stockholm, Sweden	Pacific University	6 ft 8 in (2.03 m)	210 lb (95 kg)	Sep 12, 2024
Villiam Garcia Adsten; G	Recruit ratings: No ratings found				
Overall recruit ranking:
Note: In many cases, Scout, Rivals, 247Sports, On3, and ESPN may conflict in their listings of height and weight.; In these cases, the average was taken. ESPN grades are on a 100-point scale.; Sources: "Drexel 2024 Basketball Commitments". Rivals.; "Drexel Dragons". ESPN.; "2024 Team Ranking". Rivals.; "Drexel 2024 Basketball Commits". 247Sports.

=== Recruiting class ===
==== 2024 recruiting class ====
College recruiting information
Name	Hometown	School	Height	Weight	Commit date
Josh Reed; PG	Philadelphia, PA	Archbishop Wood High School	6 ft 3 in (1.91 m)	180 lb (82 kg)	Sep 13, 2023
Josh Reed; PG	Recruit ratings: No ratings found				
Clemson Edomwonyin; PF	Elche, Spain	South Kent School	6 ft 9 in (2.06 m)	N/A	Jan 26, 2024
Clemson Edomwonyin; PF	Recruit ratings: No ratings found				
Ralph Akuta; C	Ijamsville, MD	Hargrave Military Academy	6 ft 11 in (2.11 m)	N/A	Apr 16, 2024
Ralph Akuta; C	Recruit ratings: No ratings found				
Overall recruit ranking:
Note: In many cases, Scout, Rivals, 247Sports, On3, and ESPN may conflict in their listings of height and weight.; In these cases, the average was taken. ESPN grades are on a 100-point scale.; Sources: "Drexel 2024 Basketball Commitments". Rivals.; "Drexel Dragons". ESPN.; "2024 Team Ranking". Rivals.; "Drexel 2024 Basketball Commits". 247Sports.

== Roster ==
2024–25 Drexel Dragons men's basketball team
Players
Coaches

Pos.	#	Name	Height	Weight	Year	Previous school	Hometown
F	0	Horace Simmons	6 ft 6 in (1.98 m)	205 lb (93 kg)	RS Fr	La Salle College HS	Glenside, PA
F	1	Victor Panov	6 ft 7 in (2.01 m)	225 lb (102 kg)	Jr	DME Academy/Daytona State	Saint Petersburg, Russia
G	2	Josh Reed	6 ft 2 in (1.88 m)	185 lb (84 kg)	Fr	Archbishop Wood HS	Wyndmoor, PA
G	3	Kevon Vanderhorst	6 ft 2 in (1.88 m)	170 lb (77 kg)	So	Trinity Academy (NC)/Brunswick CC	Raleigh, NC
G	4	Shane Blakeney	6 ft 5 in (1.96 m)	195 lb (88 kg)	RS So	Legion Collegiate Academy	Rock Hill, SC
G	5	Kobe MaGee	6 ft 6 in (1.98 m)	195 lb (88 kg)	Jr	Executive Education Academy	Allentown, PA
F	6	Clem Edomwonyin	6 ft 9 in (2.06 m)	200 lb (91 kg)	Fr	London Academy	East London, England
G	11	Jason Drake	6 ft 2 in (1.88 m)	185 lb (84 kg)	Jr	Butler CC (KS)/Cleveland State	Oak Park, MI
F	13	Garfield Turner (injured) (redshirt)	6 ft 8 in (2.03 m)	240 lb (109 kg)	Sr	Mt. Zion Prep/Odessa	Gaithersburg, MD
F	15	Cole Hargrove	6 ft 8 in (2.03 m)	235 lb (107 kg)	Jr	Methacton High School	Norristown, PA
G	22	Villiam Garcia Adsten	6 ft 8 in (2.03 m)	210 lb (95 kg)	So	Korrespondensgymnasiet	Stockholm, Sweden
F	23	Yame Butler	6 ft 5 in (1.96 m)	215 lb (98 kg)		Fork Union/Fordham	Greenbelt, MD
G	25	Max Davis (W)	6 ft 4 in (1.93 m)	200 lb (91 kg)	RS So	IMG Academy	New York, NY
C	33	Ralph Akuta	7 ft 1 in (2.16 m)	245 lb (111 kg)	Fr	Hargrave Military Academy	Ijamsville, MD

Head coach

- Zach Spiker (Ithaca)

Assistant coach(es)

- Paul Fortier (Washington)
- Will Chavis (Texas Tech)
- Frantz Massenat (Drexel)

Legend

- (C) Team captain
- (S) Suspended
- (I) Ineligible
- (W) Walk-on
- Injured
- Current redshirt

Roster
Last update: September 12, 2024

== Schedule and results ==
Date time, TV	Rank^{#}	Opponent^{#}	Result	Record	High points	High rebounds	High assists	Site (attendance) city, state
Exhibition
October 29, 2024; 6:00 p.m.		Chestnut Hill	W 80–50	1–0	19 – MaGee	9 – 2 tied	–	Daskalakis Athletic Center; Philadelphia, PA
Non-conference regular season
November 4, 2024*; 6:00 p.m., FloHoops		Georgian Court	W 95–43	1–0	24 – Simmons	8 – 2 tied	6 – 2 tied	Daskalakis Athletic Center (1,022); Philadelphia, PA
November 9, 2024*; 2:00 p.m., NBCSPHI		Colgate	W 73–56	2–0	28 – MaGee	9 – 2 tied	3 – 2 tied	Daskalakis Athletic Center (1,507); Philadelphia, PA
November 12, 2024*; 7:00 p.m., ESPN+		at Temple; Big 5 Classic Pod 1	L 61–69	2–1	17 – MaGee	12 – Hargrove	4 – Butler	Liacouras Center (4,547); Philadelphia, PA
November 16, 2024*; 2:00 p.m., FloSports		La Salle; Big 5 Classic Pod 1	L 68–71	2–2	18 – Drake	15 – Hargrove	4 – 2 tied	Daskalakis Athletic Center (1,948); Philadelphia, PA
November 19, 2024*; 7:00 p.m., ESPN+		at Fairfield	W 67–61	3–2	16 – Blakeney	9 – Blakeney	4 – Hargrove	Leo D. Mahoney Arena (1,581); Fairfield, CT
November 22, 2024*; 7:00 p.m., ESPN+		at Fordham; Sunshine Slam campus game	W 73–71	4–2	15 – Drake	6 – Butler	7 – Drake	Rose Hill Gymnasium (1,237); The Bronx, New York
November 25, 2024*; 12:30 p.m.		vs. Purdue Fort Wayne; Sunshine Slam Ocean Bracket semifinal	L 81–87	4–3	19 – Hargrove	14 – Hargrove	5 – Drake	Ocean Center; Daytona Beach, FL
November 26, 2024*; 10:30 a.m.		vs. Chicago State; Sunshine Slam Ocean Bracket consolation	W 83–71	5–3	23 – MaGee	9 – MaGee	4 – Hargrove	Ocean Center; Daytona Beach, FL
December 2, 2024*; 7:00 p.m., NBCSPHI		Bryant	L 73–78	5–4	28 – Butler	7 – 2 tied	4 – 2 tied	Daskalakis Athletic Center (1,061); Philadelphia, PA
December 7, 2024*; 2:00 p.m., NBCSPHI		vs. Penn; Big 5 Classic 5th-place game	W 60–47	6–4	17 – Hargrove	13 – Hargrove	3 – Blakeney	Wells Fargo Center; Philadelphia, PA
December 14, 2024*; 7:00 p.m., ESPN+		at Albany	W 77–70	7–4	17 – MaGee	8 – Hargrove	4 – Hargrove	Broadview Center (1,577); Albany, NY
December 17, 2024*; 4:00 p.m., ESPN+		at Howard	W 68–65	8–4	21 – Drake	10 – Hargrove	4 – MaGee	Burr Gymnasium (683); Washington, D.C.
December 21, 2024*; 12:00 p.m., NBCSPHI		vs. Penn State; Holiday Hoopfest	L 64–75	8–5	16 – Butler	7 – Butler	3 – 3 tied	Wells Fargo Center (2,312); Philadelphia, PA
CAA regular season
January 2, 2025; 7:00 p.m., FloHoops		at Campbell	L 54–57	8–6 (0–1)	15 – MaGee	9 – Hargrove	3 – Drake	Gore Arena (1,051); Buies Creek, NC
January 4, 2025; 2:00 p.m., FloHoops		at North Carolina A&T	W 68–59	9–6 (1–1)	24 – Butler	8 – MaGee	4 – 2 tied	Corbett Sports Center (714); Greensboro, NC
January 9, 2025; 7:00 p.m., FloHoops		at Stony Brook	W 67–51	10–6 (2–1)	24 – MaGee	10 – 2 tied	4 – Panov	Stony Brook Arena (1,636); Stony Brook, NY
January 11, 2025; 2:00 p.m., FloHoops		Towson	L 82–93 ^{OT}	10–7 (2–2)	21 – Butler	8 – Hargrove	4 – Drake	Daskalakis Athletic Center (1,436); Philadelphia, PA
January 16, 2025; 7:00 p.m., FloHoops		Elon	L 54–65	10–8 (2–3)	17 – MaGee	6 – 2 tied	3 – Hargrove	Daskalakis Athletic Center (959); Philadelphia, PA
January 20, 2025; 3:00 p.m., CBSSN		Hofstra	W 60–55	11–8 (3–3)	15 – Hargrove	9 – Hargrove	3 – Drake	Daskalakis Athletic Center (1,136); Philadelphia, PA
January 23, 2025; 7:00 p.m., FloHoops		at Northeastern	L 61–70	11–9 (3–4)	17 – Butler	8 – MaGee	2 – 3 tied	Matthews Arena (1,237); Boston, MA
January 25, 2025; 2:00 p.m., FloHoops		Delaware	W 67–54	12–9 (4–4)	22 – MaGee	8 – Hargrove	2 – 4 Tied	Daskalakis Athletic Center (2,446); Philadelphia, PA
January 30, 2025; 7:00 p.m., FloHoops		at Monmouth	L 97–104 ^{2OT}	12–10 (4–5)	17 – Tied	10 – Butler	3 – Tied	OceanFirst Bank Center (1,724); West Long Branch, NJ
February 1, 2025; 6:00 p.m., CBSSN		at Towson	L 54–55	12–11 (4–6)	11 – Tied	12 – MaGee	2 – Tied	TU Arena (3,204); Towson, MD
February 6, 2025; 7:00 p.m., FloHoops		William & Mary	W 86–66	13–11 (5–6)	25 – Drake	8 – Hargrove	9 – Drake	Daskalakis Athletic Center (1,085); Philadelphia, PA
February 8, 2024; 2:00 p.m., CBSSN		UNC Wilmington	L 79–81 ^{2OT}	13–12 (5–7)	21 – Drake	10 – MaGee	5 – Drake	Daskalakis Athletic Center (1,163); Philadelphia, PA
February 13, 2025; 7:00 p.m., FloHoops		at Hampton	L 58–63	13–13 (5–8)	11 – Tied	7 – MaGee	4 – Blakeney	Hampton Convocation Center (408); Hampton, VA
February 15, 2025; 2:00 p.m., FloHoops		at William & Mary	L 59–72	13–14 (5–9)	15 – Blakeney	5 – Tied	5 – Drake	Kaplan Arena (5,103); Williamsburg, VA
February 20, 2025; 6:30 p.m., FloHoops		at Delaware	W 78–74	14–14 (6–9)	14 – Drake	7 – Tied	6 – Drake	Bob Carpenter Center (1,951); Newark, DE
February 22, 2025; 12:00 p.m., CBSSN		Charleston	W 64–55	15–14 (7–9)	19 – MaGee	6 – Drake	4 – Blakeney	Daskalakis Athletic Center (1,723); Philadelphia, PA
February 27, 2025; 7:00 p.m., FloHoops		Hampton	W 53–52	16–14 (8–9)	15 – Drake	9 – Hargrove	3 – Tied	Daskalakis Athletic Center (1,357); Philadelphia, PA
March 1, 2025; 2:00 p.m., FloHoops		Monmouth	W 71–61	17–14 (9–9)	20 – Butler	8 – MaGee	2 – Tied	Daskalakis Athletic Center (1,193); Philadelphia, PA
CAA tournament
March 8, 2025; 12:00 pm, FloHoops	(8)	vs. (9) Elon; Second round	W 91–74	18–14	25 – Drake	10 – Hargrove	4 – Tied	CareFirst Arena; Washington, D.C.
March 9, 2025; 12:00 pm, FloHoops	(8)	vs. (1) Towson; Quarterfinals	L 76–82	18–15	24 – Blakeney	8 – Hargrove	3 – Tied	CareFirst Arena; Washington, D.C.
*Non-conference game. ^{#}Rankings from AP. (#) Tournament seedings in parentheses. All times are in Eastern.

== Awards ==
Cole Hargrove

- CAA All-Defensive Team
- Philadelphia Big 5 Most Improved Player

Kobe MaGee

- CAA All-Conference Third Team
- Philadelphia Big 5 Second Team

== See also ==
- 2024–25 Drexel Dragons women's basketball team
