= Chris Mack (basketball) =

American basketball coach (born 1969)

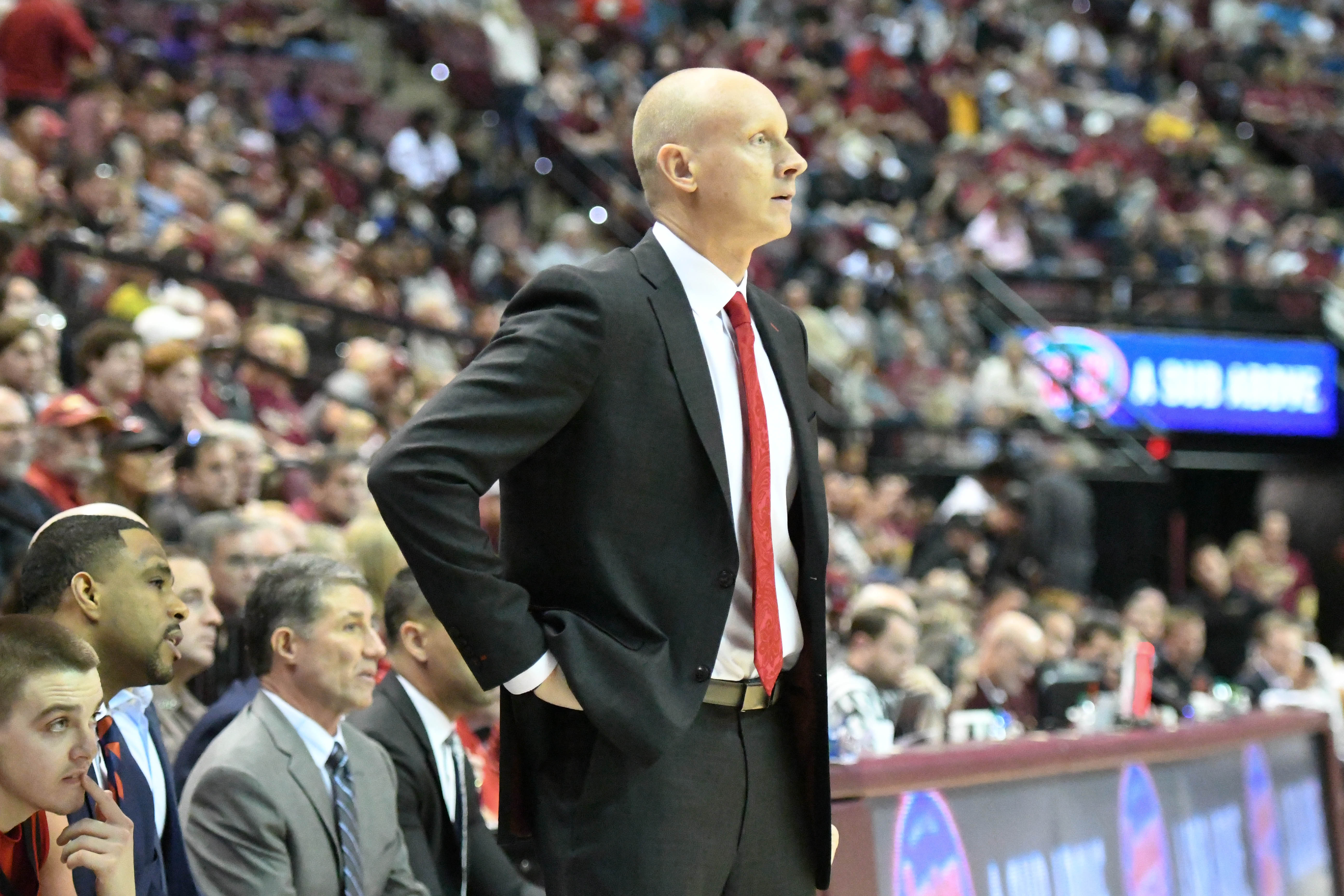
- Mack in 2019

Current position
- Title: Head coach
- Team: South Florida
- Conference: American
- Record: 3–2 (.600)

Biographical details
- Born: December 30, 1969 (age 56); Cleveland, Ohio, U.S.

Playing career
- 1988–1990: Evansville
- 1991–1993: Xavier

Coaching career (HC unless noted)
- 1993–1994: McAuley HS (JV)
- 1995–1999: Mount Notre Dame HS
- 1999–2001: Xavier (assistant)
- 2001–2004: Wake Forest (assistant)
- 2004–2009: Xavier (assistant)
- 2009–2018: Xavier
- 2018–2022: Louisville
- 2024–2026: Charleston
- 2026–present: South Florida

Head coaching record
- Overall: 326–155 (.678)
- Tournaments: NCAA: 11–9 (.550)

Accomplishments and honors

Championships
- Big East regular season (2018); 2 Atlantic 10 regular season (2010, 2011)

Awards
- Big East Coach of the Year (2018); Henry Iba Award (2016); Atlantic 10 Coach of the Year (2011); Skip Prosser Man of the Year Award (2011)

Christopher Lee Mack (born December 30, 1969) is an American college basketball coach who is currently the head coach at the University of South Florida. He formerly served as head coach for the College of Charleston, University of Louisville and Xavier University.

== Background ==
Chris Mack was born in Cleveland, Ohio and grew up in North College Hill, Ohio, a suburb of Cincinnati. He graduated in 1988 from St. Xavier High School in Cincinnati, where he was named 1987–88 Cincinnati Post Metro Player of the Year.

Mack continued on to the University of Evansville, where he played basketball for two seasons. He then transferred to Xavier University in 1990, where he played his final two seasons of eligibility (after redshirting one due to then-current NCAA transfer rules), and graduated in 1992 with a B.A. in Communication Arts. He is married to the former Christi Hester, a Louisville native and former University of Dayton guard (1996–2000). They have three children.

== Coaching career ==
=== High school ===
Mack started his coaching career as junior varsity head coach at McAuley High School, an all-girls high school in Cincinnati, in 1993. In 1995, Mack was named head coach of the girls varsity basketball team at Mount Notre Dame High School in Reading, Ohio, where he received the 1996 Coach of the Year award from the Cincinnati Post.

=== College ===
==== Xavier and Wake Forest ====
In 1999, he was named Director of Basketball Operations at Xavier University, serving under the late Skip Prosser, whom he followed as an assistant coach to Wake Forest in 2001.

==== Return to Xavier ====
In 2004 Mack returned to Xavier, joining new head coach Sean Miller as his top assistant.

==== Head coach at Xavier ====
When Miller left for the University of Arizona in 2009, on April 15, 2009, it was announced that Mack would replace Miller as Xavier's head coach. The first top 25 ranking by a Mack-led Xavier team was March 1, 2010 when it made its season debut in the Associated Press Poll at #25. During that season, the Jordan Crawford-led Musketeers won the Atlantic 10 Conference and advanced to the NCAA Sweet 16.

The Musketeers had question marks heading into the next season, yet Mack guided the team to its fifth consecutive Atlantic 10 Championship before falling to Marquette in the first round of the NCAA tournament. During both of these years, Mack earned Atlantic 10 Coach of the Year awards. Heading into the 2011–2012 campaign, the Musketeers were slated to be one of the top teams in the country. With senior All-American Tu Holloway returning, Mack and Xavier were on the cusp of a special year. Xavier got off to a good start and were ranked as high as #7 before a bench-clearing brawl with their in-city rival, the Cincinnati Bearcats. Mack's squad advanced to the NCAA Sweet 16 with wins over Notre Dame and Lehigh.

After Xavier joined the reconfigured Big East for the 2013–14 season, it continued to build on success attained in the A-10, making the Sweet Sixteen for a third time in six years during the 2014–15 season while attaining regular Top 25 rankings. Mack won several national coach of the year awards following the 2015–16 season in which Xavier finished 28–6, including the Hank Iba Award.

The Musketeers had the highest preseason ranking in school history of 7th (Associated Press) under Mack prior to the 2016–17. After overcoming multiple injuries to key players, Xavier defeated 6th-seeded Maryland, 3rd-seeded Florida State and 2nd-seeded Arizona, landing in the Elite Eight for the third time in school history.

On January 18, 2018, Mack passed former Xavier head coach Pete Gillen and became the all-time leader in Xavier coaching wins after defeating St. Johns 88–82. Mack eventually would lead his 2018 Xavier squad to the school's first No. 1 seed, becoming the 1-seed in the NCAA Tournament's West Region. The team would eventually bow out of the tournament in the second round to Florida State, losing 75–70 to the West Region's 9-seed. Xavier finished the 2018 season with a 29–6 record.

==== University of Louisville ====
On March 27, 2018, Mack agreed to terms on a seven-year contract worth about $4 million annually to become the next head coach at the University of Louisville. In December 2019 Mack's Louisville basketball team was ranked #1 in the country for two weeks before stumbling and losing 3 out of 5 games. In January 2020 the team recovered to beat #3 ranked Duke in a statement win.

Mack was suspended from the first six games of the 2021–22 season. The university claimed that Mack violated the school's guidelines while dealing with former assistant coach Dino Gaudio's extortion attempts. Unbeknownst to Gaudio, Mack recorded the conversation, in which he fired the assistant coach and was threatened by Gaudio for doing so. On January 26, 2022, it was announced that Mack was out as head coach of the University of Louisville. Louisville paid Mack $4.8 million — $133,000 per month for three years with his termination.

==== College of Charleston ====
After a two-year coaching hiatus, Mack signed a five-year contract worth roughly $1.1 million annually to lead the College of Charleston men's basketball team, after former Mack-assistant and Charleston head coach Pat Kelsey left to coach at the University of Louisville. Mack earned the 300th win of his career on February 27, 2025, in a 94–84 victory over the Delaware Fightin' Blue Hens.

==== University of South Florida ====
On March 25, 2026 Mack accepted the head-coaching job at The University of South Florida (USF).

== Head coaching record ==
Record table
Season	Team	Overall	Conference	Standing	Postseason
Xavier Musketeers (Atlantic 10 Conference) (2009–2013)
2009–10	Xavier	26–9	14–2	T–1st	NCAA Division I Sweet 16
2010–11	Xavier	24–8	15–1	1st	NCAA Division I Round of 64
2011–12	Xavier	23–13	10–6	3rd	NCAA Division I Sweet 16
2012–13	Xavier	17–14	9–7	T–6th	
Xavier Musketeers (Big East Conference) (2013–2018)
2013–14	Xavier	21–13	10–8	T–3rd	NCAA Division I First Four
2014–15	Xavier	23–14	9–9	6th	NCAA Division I Sweet 16
2015–16	Xavier	28–6	14–4	2nd	NCAA Division I Round of 32
2016–17	Xavier	24–14	9–9	7th	NCAA Division I Elite Eight
2017–18	Xavier	29–6	15–3	1st	NCAA Division I Round of 32
Xavier:		215–97 (.689)	105–49 (.682)		
Louisville Cardinals (Atlantic Coast Conference) (2018–2022)
2018–19	Louisville	20–14	10–8	T–6th	NCAA Division I Round of 64
2019–20	Louisville	24–7	15–5	T–2nd	No postseason due to COVID-19 pandemic
2020–21	Louisville	13–7	8–5	7th	
2021–22	Louisville	6–8	5–5		
Louisville:		63–36 (.636)	38–23 (.623)		
Charleston Cougars (Coastal Athletic Association) (2024–2026)
2024–25	Charleston	24–9	13–5	3rd	
2025–26	Charleston	21–11	14–4	2nd	
Charleston:		45–20 (.692)	27–9 (.750)		
South Florida Bulls (The American) (2026–present)
2026–27	South Florida	3–2	0–0		
South Florida:		3–2 (.600)	0–0 (–)		
Total:		326–155 (.678)			
