= 2023–24 Saint Louis Billikens men's basketball team =

American college basketball season

2023–24 Saint Louis Billikens men's basketball
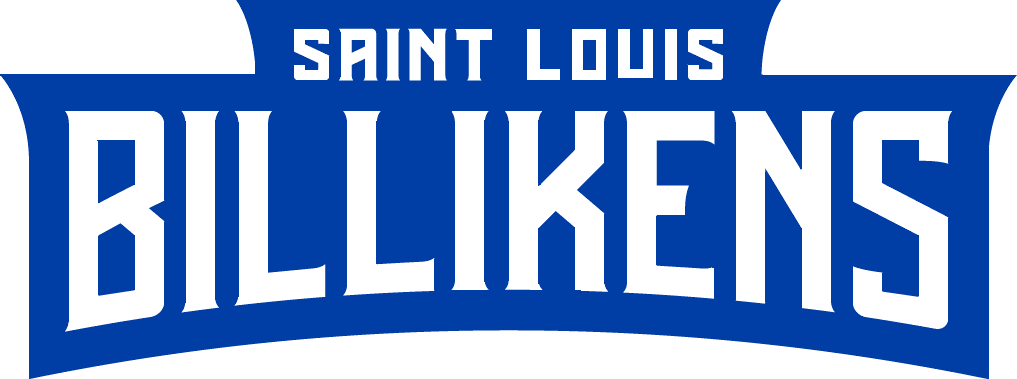
- Conference: Atlantic 10 Conference
- Record: 13–20 (5–13 A–10)
- Head coach: Travis Ford (8th season)
- Associate head coach: Corey Tate
- Assistant coaches: Chris Harriman; Charles Thomas
- Home arena: Chaifetz Arena

2023–24 Atlantic 10 men's basketball standings
| | Conf. | | | | Overall |
| Team | W | | L | PCT | W | | L | PCT |
|---|---|---|---|---|---|---|---|---|
| Richmond | 15 | – | 3 | .833 | 23 | – | 10 | .697 |
| Loyola Chicago | 15 | – | 3 | .833 | 23 | – | 10 | .697 |
| No. 24 Dayton | 14 | – | 4 | .778 | 25 | – | 8 | .758 |
| UMass | 11 | – | 7 | .611 | 20 | – | 11 | .645 |
| VCU | 11 | – | 7 | .611 | 24 | – | 14 | .632 |
| Duquesne † | 10 | – | 8 | .556 | 25 | – | 12 | .676 |
| St. Bonaventure | 9 | – | 9 | .500 | 20 | – | 13 | .606 |
| George Mason | 9 | – | 9 | .500 | 20 | – | 12 | .625 |
| Saint Joseph's | 9 | – | 9 | .500 | 21 | – | 14 | .600 |
| La Salle | 6 | – | 12 | .333 | 16 | – | 17 | .485 |
| Rhode Island | 6 | – | 12 | .333 | 12 | – | 20 | .375 |
| Fordham | 6 | – | 12 | .333 | 13 | – | 20 | .394 |
| Davidson | 5 | – | 13 | .278 | 15 | – | 17 | .469 |
| Saint Louis | 5 | – | 13 | .278 | 13 | – | 20 | .394 |
| George Washington | 4 | – | 14 | .222 | 15 | – | 17 | .469 |
† 2024 A-10 tournament winner Rankings from AP poll

The 2023–24 Saint Louis Billikens men's basketball team represented Saint Louis University during the 2023–24 NCAA Division I men's basketball season. They were led by eighth-year head coach Travis Ford and played their home games at Chaifetz Arena as a member of the Atlantic 10 Conference.

== Previous season ==
The Billikens finished the 2022–23 season 21–12, 12–6 in A-10 Play to finish in a three-way tie for second place. As a No. 4 seed they defeated George Mason in the quarterfinals of the A-10 tournament before losing to VCU. Despite having 21 wins, they did not participate in a postseason tournament.

== Offseason ==
=== Departures ===
| Name | Number | Pos. | Height | Weight | Year | Hometown | Reason for departure |
|---|---|---|---|---|---|---|---|
| Yuri Collins | 1 | G | 6'0" | 190 | Junior | St. Louis, MO | Graduated |
| Javonte Perkins | 3 | G/F | 6'6" | 205 | RS Senior | St. Louis, MO | Graduated |
| Javon Pickett | 4 | G | 6'5" | 215 | Senior | Belleville, IL | Graduated |
| Francis Okoro | 5 | F | 6'9" | 230 | RS Senior | Imo, Nigeria | Graduated |
| Fred Thatch Jr. | 20 | G | 6'3" | 215 | RS Junior | Sikeston, MO | Graduated |
| Jake Forrester | 10 | F | 6'9" | 225 | Senior | Harrisburg, PA | Graduated |
| Daniel Rivera | 11 | F | 6'6" | 210 | Sophomore | San Juan, PR | Transferred to Bryant |
| Nick Kramer | 13 | G | 6'3" | 210 | Freshman | St. Louis, MO | Transferred to Missouri State |
| Mohamadou Cisse | 35 | C | 6'10" | 210 | Freshman | Dakar, Senegal | Transferred to Trinity Valley CC |

=== Incoming transfers ===
| Name | Number | Pos. | Height | Weight | Year | Hometown | Previous School |
|---|---|---|---|---|---|---|---|
| Bradley Ezewiro | 3 | F | 6'8" | 246 | Junior | Torrance, CA | Georgetown |
| Tim Dalger | 5 | F | 6'7" | 218 | RS Senior | Fort Lauderdale, FL | Tulsa |
| Michael Meadows | 7 | G | 6'2" | 175 | RS Senior | Hollywood, CA | Portland |

=== Recruiting classes ===
==== 2023 recruiting class ====
College recruiting information
| Name | Hometown | School | Height | Weight | Commit date |
|---|---|---|---|---|---|
| Cian Medley; PG | Camden, NJ | Camden High School | 6 ft 0 in (1.83 m) | 150 lb (68 kg) | Jul 12, 2022 |
| Cian Medley; PG | Recruit ratings: Rivals: 247Sports: | | | | |
| Abou Magassa; PF | Morsang-sur-Orge, France | Chorale Roanne Basket | 6 ft 9 in (2.06 m) | N/A | Jun 9, 2023 |
| Abou Magassa; PF | Recruit ratings: No ratings found | | | | |
| Bruce Zhang; C | Beijing, China | Skill Factory | 7 ft 1 in (2.16 m) | 250 lb (110 kg) | Nov 15, 2022 |
| Bruce Zhang; C | Recruit ratings: No ratings found | | | | |
| Đorđe Ćurčić; PG | Čačak, Serbia | Košarkaški klub Borac Čačak | 6 ft 3 in (1.91 m) | N/A | Jul 3, 2023 |
| Đorđe Ćurčić; PG | Recruit ratings: No ratings found | | | | |
| Stef van Bussel; C | Ommel, Netherlands | Bayer Giants Leverkusen | 6 ft 10 in (2.08 m) | N/A | May 3, 2023 |
| Stef van Bussel; C | Recruit ratings: No ratings found | | | | |
Overall recruit ranking:
Note: In many cases, Scout, Rivals, 247Sports, On3, and ESPN may conflict in their listings of height and weight.; In these cases, the average was taken. ESPN grades are on a 100-point scale.; Sources: "2023 Team Ranking". Rivals.

==== 2024 recruiting class ====
College recruiting information (2024)
| Name | Hometown | School | Height | Weight | Commit date |
|---|---|---|---|---|---|
| Ja'Quavis Williford; SF | Los Angeles, CA | Middlebrooks Academy | 6 ft 6 in (1.98 m) | 180 lb (82 kg) | Oct 19, 2023 |
| Ja'Quavis Williford; SF | Recruit ratings: 247Sports: | | | | |
Overall recruit ranking:
Note: In many cases, Scout, Rivals, 247Sports, On3, and ESPN may conflict in their listings of height and weight.; In these cases, the average was taken. ESPN grades are on a 100-point scale.; Sources: "2024 Team Ranking". Rivals.

== Roster ==
2023–24 Saint Louis Billikens men's basketball team
Players
Coaches

| Pos. | # | Name | Height | Weight | Year | Previous school | Hometown |
|---|---|---|---|---|---|---|---|
| G | 0 | Kellen Thames | 6 ft 5 in (1.96 m) | 205 lb (93 kg) | So | Pattonville | St. Louis, MO |
| G | 1 | Cian Medley | 5 ft 11 in (1.8 m) | 165 lb (75 kg) | Fr | Camden | Sicklerville, NJ |
| G | 2 | Larry Hughes Jr. | 6 ft 4 in (1.93 m) | 185 lb (84 kg) | So | CBC | St. Louis, MO |
| F | 3 | Bradley Ezewiro | 6 ft 9 in (2.06 m) | 265 lb (120 kg) | Jr | Oak Hill Academy; Georgetown | Torrance, CA |
| G | 4 | Đorđe Ćurčić | 6 ft 2 in (1.88 m) | 185 lb (84 kg) | Fr | Gimnazija | Čačak, Serbia |
| F | 5 | Tim Dalger | 6 ft 7 in (2.01 m) | 215 lb (98 kg) | RS Sr | Calvary Christian; Tulsa | Fort Lauderdale, FL |
| G | 7 | Michael Meadows | 6 ft 2 in (1.88 m) | 175 lb (79 kg) | RS Sr | Campbell Hall School; Portland | Hollywood, CA |
| F | 10 | Abou Magassa | 6 ft 7 in (2.01 m) | 215 lb (98 kg) | Fr | Chorale Roanne Basket | Morsang-sur-Orge, France |
| F | 11 | Alex Nokes (W) | 6 ft 6 in (1.98 m) | 210 lb (95 kg) | Fr | Beverly Hills | Pacific Palisades, CA |
| C | 12 | Bruce Zhang | 7 ft 0 in (2.13 m) | 265 lb (120 kg) | Fr | The Skill Factory (GA) | Nanchang, China |
| F | 13 | Tsvet Sotirov (W) | 6 ft 7 in (2.01 m) | 210 lb (95 kg) | Fr | Rolling Meadows | Rolling Meadows, IL |
| C | 15 | Stef Van Bussel | 6 ft 10 in (2.08 m) | 255 lb (116 kg) | Fr | Philips van Horne/Peelland College | Ommel, Netherlands |
| G | 21 | Sincere Parker | 6 ft 3 in (1.91 m) | 195 lb (88 kg) | Jr | Rockford East; Moberly Area Community College | Rockford, IL |
| F | 22 | Terrence Hargrove Jr. | 6 ft 5 in (1.96 m) | 215 lb (98 kg) | Sr | East St. Louis | East St. Louis, IL |
| G | 24 | Gibson Jimerson | 6 ft 5 in (1.96 m) | 215 lb (98 kg) | RS Jr | Montverde Academy | Richmond, VA |
| G | 25 | Phil Jones (W) | 6 ft 1 in (1.85 m) | 185 lb (84 kg) | So | Mount Carmel | Chicago, IL |
| G | 33 | Lamont Evans IV (W) | 6 ft 0 in (1.83 m) | 155 lb (70 kg) | Jr | Blanche Ely; South Florida | Hollywood, FL |

Head coach

- Travis Ford (Kentucky)

Assistant coach(es)

- Corey Tate (Missouri)
- Chris Harriman (Augusta State)
- Charles Thomas (Eastern Michigan)

Legend

- (C) Team captain
- (S) Suspended
- (I) Ineligible
- (W) Walk-on
- Injured
- Current redshirt

Roster

== Schedule and results ==
| Date time, TV | Rank^{#} | Opponent^{#} | Result | Record | High points | High rebounds | High assists | Site (attendance) city, state |
Exhibition
| October 24, 2023*; 7:00 p.m. | | Kentucky Wesleyan | W 85–75 | | 21 – Jimerson | 8 – Dalger | 4 – Medley | Chaifetz Arena; St. Louis, MO |
| October 29, 2023*; 3:00 p.m. | | Berea | W 98–60 | | 18 – Parker | 10 – Dalger | 4 – Tied | Chaifetz Arena; St. Louis, MO |
Non-conference regular season
| November 6, 2023*; 7:00 p.m., BSMW/ESPN+ | | Southern Indiana | W 75–63 | 1–0 | 27 – Meadows | 15 – Hargrove Jr. | 5 – Jimerson | Chaifetz Arena (4,989); St. Louis, MO |
| November 8, 2023*; 7:00 p.m., BSMW/ESPN+ | | Lincoln (MO) | W 102–66 | 2–0 | 20 – Parker | 9 – Van Bussel | 4 – Meadows | Chaifetz Arena (3,189); St. Louis, MO |
| November 11, 2023*; 7:00 p.m., BSMWX/ESPN+ | | Illinois State | W 80–71 | 3–0 | 20 – Jimmerson | 9 – Parker | 2 – Tied | Chaifetz Arena (5,332); St. Louis, MO |
| November 16, 2023*; 1:00 p.m., ESPN2 | | vs. Wyoming; Myrtle Beach Invitational quarterfinals | W 79–69 | 4–0 | 22 – Parker | 8 – Parker | 3 – Tied | HTC Center (1,201); Conway, SC |
| November 17, 2023*; 11:00 a.m., ESPN2 | | vs. Vermont; Myrtle Beach Invitational semifinals | L 68–78 | 4–1 | 18 – Jimerson | 6 – Tied | 5 – Meadows Jr. | HTC Center (1,126); Conway, SC |
| November 19, 2023*; 7:00 p.m., ESPN2 | | vs. Wichita State; Myrtle Beach Invitational 3rd place game | L 69–88 | 4–2 | 21 – Hargrove Jr. | 7 – Hargrove Jr. | 7 – Meadows Jr. | HTC Center (1,233); Conway, SC |
| November 25, 2023*; 7:00 p.m., BSMW/ESPN+ | | Dartmouth | W 66–65 | 5–2 | 23 – Jimerson | 8 – Dalger | 3 – Medley | Chaifetz Arena (4,523); St. Louis, MO |
| November 28, 2023*; 7:00 p.m., BSMWX/ESPN+ | | Utah State | L 76–81 | 5–3 | 28 – Jimerson | 4 – Tied | 5 – Jimerson | Chaifetz Arena (4,721); St. Louis, MO |
| December 2, 2023*; 2:30 p.m. | | at Southern Illinois | L 62–101 | 5–4 | 18 – Dalger | 11 – Thames | 3 – Jimerson | Banterra Center (5,021); Carbondale, IL |
| December 6, 2023*; 7:00 p.m., ESPN+ | | at Drake | L 69–75 | 5–5 | 23 – Jimerson | 9 – Hargrove Jr. | 3 – Medley | Knapp Center (3,124); Des Moines, IA |
| December 9, 2023*; 2:00 p.m., BSMW/ESPN+ | | Hofstra | W 71–68 | 6–5 | 21 – Jimerson | 8 – Medley | 5 – Tied | Chaifetz Arena (5,127); St. Louis, MO |
| December 16, 2023*; 7:00 p.m., BSMWX/ESPN+ | | Louisiana Tech | W 75–74 | 7–5 | 23 – Jimerson | 7 – Zhang | 7 – Medley | Chaifetz Arena (4,789); St. Louis, MO |
| December 20, 2023*; 6:00 p.m., ACCNX/ESPN+ | | at NC State | L 70–82 | 7–6 | 18 – Ezewiro | 9 – Ezewiro | 6 – Medley | PNC Arena (12,555); Raleigh, NC |
Atlantic 10 regular season
| January 3, 2024; 6:00 p.m., BSMW/ESPN+ | | Loyola Chicago | L 73–80 | 7–7 (0–1) | 19 – Jimerson | 10 – Ezewiro | 5 – Meadows | Chaifetz Arena (7,068); St. Louis, MO |
| January 6, 2024; 1:00 p.m., USA | | at George Mason | L 67–79 | 7–8 (0–2) | 20 – Jimerson | 8 – Ezewiro | 3 – Thames | EagleBank Arena (3,456); Fairfax, VA |
| January 10, 2024; 6:00 p.m., CBSSN | | Saint Joseph's | W 88–85 | 8–8 (1–2) | 27 – Jimerson | 6 – Ezewiro | 5 – Medley | Chaifetz Arena (6,245); St. Louis, MO |
| January 16, 2024; 7:00 p.m., CBSSN | | at No. 21 Dayton | L 65–70 | 8–9 (1–3) | 13 – Jimerson | 7 – Ezewiro | 3 – Medley | UD Arena (13,407); Dayton, OH |
| January 19, 2024; 6:00 p.m., ESPN2 | | at VCU | L 61–85 | 8–10 (1–4) | 21 – Parker | 6 – Ezewiro | 5 – Medley | Siegel Center (7,637); Richmond, VA |
| January 24, 2024; 6:00 p.m., BSMW/ESPN+ | | Davidson | L 61–84 | 8–11 (1–5) | 20 – Ezewiro | 6 – Tied | 4 – Medley | Chaifetz Arena (5,647); St. Louis, MO |
| January 27, 2024; 7:00 p.m., BSMW/ESPN+ | | UMass | L 73–84 | 8–12 (1–6) | 16 – Jimerson | 5 – Thames | 7 – Meadows, Jr | Chaifetz Arena (7,423); St. Louis, MO |
| January 30, 2024; 7:00 p.m., BSMW/ESPN+ | | at Loyola Chicago | L 62–77 | 8–13 (1–7) | 16 – Jimerson | 9 – Jimerson | 4 – Medley | Joseph J. Gentile Arena (3,488); Chicago, IL |
| February 3, 2024; 1:30 p.m., USA | | Fordham | L 65–67 | 8–14 (1–8) | 15 – Ezewiro | 8 – Hughes II | 5 – Medley | Chaifetz Arena (6,947); St. Louis, MO |
| February 7, 2024; 5:30 p.m., BSMW/ESPN+ | | at La Salle | W 102–84 | 9–14 (2–8) | 33 – Parker | 7 – Ezewiro | 6 – Medley | Tom Gola Arena (1,202); Philadelphia, PA |
| February 10, 2024; 11:30 a.m., USA | | at Saint Joseph's | L 86–87 | 9–15 (2–9) | 34 – Parker | 9 – Parker | 2 – Medley | Hagan Arena (2,407); Philadelphia, PA |
| February 16, 2024; 6:00 p.m., ESPN2 | | VCU | L 85–95 | 9–16 (2–10) | 30 – Parker | 4 – Tied | 5 – Tied | Chaifetz Arena (5,382); St. Louis, MO |
| February 20, 2024; 6:00 p.m., BSMW/ESPN+ | | at Duquesne | L 66–81 | 9–17 (2–11) | 17 – Hargrove | 7 – Ezewiro | 4 – Tied | UPMC Cooper Fieldhouse (2,178); Pittsburgh, PA |
| February 24, 2024; 2:00 p.m., BSMW/ESPN+ | | George Washington | W 96–91 | 10–17 (3–11) | 19 – Jimerson | 8 – Hargrove Jr. | 7 – Medley | Chaifetz Arena (7,239); St. Louis, MO |
| February 28, 2024; 7:00 p.m., BSMW/ESPN+ | | Richmond | L 64–80 | 10–18 (3–12) | 21 – Jimerson | 11 – Ezewiro | 5 – Medley | Chaifetz Arena (5,359); St. Louis, MO |
| March 2, 2024; 3:00 p.m., CBSSN | | at Rhode Island | W 94–91 | 11–18 (4–12) | 30 – Jimerson | 10 – van Bussel | 5 – Medley | Ryan Center (4,671); Kingston, RI |
| March 5, 2024; 8:00 p.m., CBSSN | | No. 25 Dayton | L 83–100 | 11–19 (4–13) | 24 – Jimerson | 5 – Hargrove Jr. | 5 – Tied | Chaifetz Arena (6,358); St. Louis, MO |
| March 9, 2024; 11:30 a.m., USA | | at St. Bonaventure | W 73–65 | 12–19 (5–13) | 17 – Hargrove Jr. | 10 – Medley | 10 – Medley | Reilly Center (4,702); Olean, NY |
A-10 tournament
| March 12, 2024; 3:30 p.m., ESPN+ | (14) | vs. (11) Rhode Island; First round | W 74–71 | 13–19 | 26 – Jimerson | 11 – Ezewiro | 9 – Medley | Barclays Center (5,946); Brooklyn, NY |
| March 13, 2024; 7:30 p.m., USA | (14) | vs. (6) Duquesne; Second round | L 73–83 | 13–20 | 22 – Jimerson | 6 – Hargrove Jr. | 5 – Medley | Barclays Center (6,432); Brooklyn, NY |
*Non-conference game. ^{#}Rankings from AP Poll. (#) Tournament seedings in parentheses. All times are in Central Time.
