= 2024–25 Towson Tigers men's basketball team =

American college basketball season

2024–25 Towson Tigers men's basketball

CAA regular season champions
- Conference: Coastal Athletic Association
- Record: 22–11 (16–2 CAA)
- Head coach: Pat Skerry (14th season)
- Associate head coach: Pat O'Connell
- Assistant coaches: Parfait Bitee; Chris Conway; John Auslander; Beruk Asfaw
- Home arena: TU Arena

2024–25 CAA men's basketball standings
	Conf.				Overall
Team	W		L	PCT	W		L	PCT
Towson	16	–	2	.889	22	–	11	.667
UNC Wilmington †	14	–	4	.778	27	–	8	.771
Charleston	13	–	5	.722	24	–	9	.727
William & Mary	11	–	7	.611	17	–	15	.531
Campbell	10	–	8	.556	15	–	17	.469
Monmouth	10	–	8	.556	13	–	20	.394
Northeastern	9	–	9	.500	17	–	15	.531
Drexel	9	–	9	.500	18	–	15	.545
Elon	8	–	10	.444	17	–	16	.515
Hampton	8	–	10	.444	17	–	16	.515
Hofstra	6	–	12	.333	15	–	18	.455
Delaware	5	–	13	.278	16	–	20	.444
Stony Brook	4	–	14	.222	8	–	24	.250
North Carolina A&T	3	–	15	.167	7	–	25	.219
† 2025 CAA tournament winner

The 2024–25 Towson Tigers men's basketball team represented Towson University during the 2024–25 NCAA Division I men's basketball season. The Tigers, led by 14th-year head coach Pat Skerry, played their home games at TU Arena in Towson, Maryland as members of the Coastal Athletic Association.

== Previous season ==
The Tigers finished the 2023–24 season 20–14, 11–7 in CAA play to finish in fifth place. They defeated William & Mary and UNC Wilmington, before falling to eventual tournament champions Charleston in the semifinals of the CAA tournament.

== Roster ==
2024–25 Towson Tigers men's basketball team
Players
Coaches

Pos.	#	Name	Height	Weight	Year	Previous school	Hometown
F	1	Tomiwa Sulaiman	6 ft 6 in (1.98 m)	215 lb (98 kg)	Sr	IUP	London, England
G	2	Jaiden Cole	6 ft 4 in (1.93 m)	180 lb (82 kg)	So	NBA Academy Latin America	Toronto, Ontario
F	3	Tyler Coleman	6 ft 7 in (2.01 m)	220 lb (100 kg)	Sr	Paul VI HS	Woodbridge, Virginia
G	4	Dylan Williamson	6 ft 1 in (1.85 m)	180 lb (82 kg)	RS So	Our Lady of Good Counsel HS	Upper Marlboro, Maryland
G/F	5	Christian May	6 ft 5 in (1.96 m)	210 lb (95 kg)	Jr	Bishop O'Connell HS	Edinburg, Virginia
G	10	Rahdir Hicks	6 ft 0 in (1.83 m)	180 lb (82 kg)	Sr	Malvern Prep	Coatesville, Pennsylvania
G/F	11	Mekhi Lowery	6 ft 7 in (2.01 m)	205 lb (93 kg)	So	Oswego East HS	Bellwood, Illinois
F	12	Abdou Samb	6 ft 8 in (2.03 m)	220 lb (100 kg)	Jr	IUPUI	Upper Marlboro, Maryland
G/F	13	Chike Ndefo	6 ft 7 in (2.01 m)	215 lb (98 kg)	Fr	Vermont Academy	Elmont, New York
G/F	15	Tyler Tejada	6 ft 9 in (2.06 m)	220 lb (100 kg)	So	Teaneck HS	Teaneck, New Jersey
G	20	Amir Shaheed	5 ft 11 in (1.8 m)	170 lb (77 kg)	Fr	Atholton HS	Columbia, Maryland
G	21	Mandela Tarke	5 ft 11 in (1.8 m)	180 lb (82 kg)	Fr	Gaithersburg HS	Silver Spring, Maryland
G	22	Ryan Skerry	6 ft 4 in (1.93 m)	195 lb (88 kg)	So	Dulaney HS	Timonium, Maryland
F	23	Caleb Embeya	6 ft 9 in (2.06 m)	220 lb (100 kg)	Fr	St. Maria Goretti HS	Kinshasa, DR Congo
G	24	Nendah Tarke	6 ft 4 in (1.93 m)	210 lb (95 kg)	RS Sr	Coppin State	Gaithersburg, Maryland
F	25	Messiah Jones	6 ft 6 in (1.98 m)	230 lb (104 kg)	GS	Wofford	Chicago, Illinois

Head coach

- Pat Skerry (Tufts)

Assistant coach(es)

- Pat O'Connell (Johns Hopkins)
- Parfait Bitee (Rhode Island)
- Chris Conway (York College)
- John Auslander (Maryland)
- Beruk Asfaw (Washington)

Legend

- (C) Team captain
- (S) Suspended
- (I) Ineligible
- (W) Walk-on
- Injured
- Current redshirt

Roster
Last update: November 4, 2024

== Schedule and results ==
Date time, TV	Rank^{#}	Opponent^{#}	Result	Record	Site (attendance) city, state
Exhibition
October 26, 2024*; 12:00 pm		at St. John's	L 46–64	–	Carnesecca Arena (1,742); Queens, NY
Non-conference regular season
November 4, 2024*; 10:00 pm, ESPN+		at Saint Mary's	L 69–76	0–1	University Credit Union Pavilion (3,326); Moraga, CA
November 8, 2024*; 6:00 pm, FloHoops		Penn State Wilkes-Barre	W 89–34	1–1	TU Arena (1,350); Towson, MD
November 12, 2024*; 7:00 pm, SECN+/ESPN+		at South Carolina	L 54–80	1–2	Colonial Life Arena (11,577); Columbia, SC
November 16, 2024*; 8:00 pm, Monumental/FloHoops		James Madison	W 67–63	2–2	TU Arena (3,036); Towson, MD
November 20, 2024*; 7:30 pm, ESPN+		at Nicholls	W 70–64	3–2	Stopher Gymnasium (655); Thibodaux, LA
November 24, 2024*; 4:00 pm, ESPN+		at Morgan State	W 64–60	4–2	Hill Field House (687); Baltimore, MD
November 28, 2024*; 9:30 pm, ESPN+		vs. Kent State; Western Slam	L 54–65	4–3	VisitLethbridge.com Arena (1,256); Lethbridge, AB
November 29, 2024*; 7:30 pm, ESPN+		vs. Kennesaw State; Western Slam	L 63–67 ^{OT}	4–4	VisitLethbridge.com Arena; Lethbridge, AB
November 30, 2024*; 9:30 pm, ESPN+		vs. UC Irvine; Western Slam	L 60–67	4–5	VisitLethbridge.com Arena (1,603); Lethbridge, AB
December 7, 2024*; 1:00 pm, Monumental/FloHoops		UMBC	L 71–84	4–6	TU Arena (1,965); Towson, MD
December 14, 2024*; 6:00 pm		vs. Duquesne; LeBron James Classic	L 47–65	4–7	LeBron James Arena (814); Akron, OH
December 17, 2024*; 7:00 pm, ESPN+		at Robert Morris	L 67–68	4–8	UPMC Events Center (754); Moon Township, PA
December 22, 2024*; 1:00 pm, Monumental/FloHoops		Bryant	W 70–65	5–8	TU Arena (1,500); Towson, MD
CAA regular season
January 2, 2025; 7:00 pm, FloHoops		at UNC Wilmington	W 65–61 ^{OT}	6–8 (1–0)	Trask Coliseum (4,719); Wilmington, NC
January 4, 2025; 2:00 pm, FloHoops		at Charleston	L 69–77	6–9 (1–1)	TD Arena (5,116); Charleston, SC
January 9, 2025; 7:00 pm, Monumental/FloHoops		Northeastern	W 80–73	7–9 (2–1)	TU Arena (1,020); Towson, MD
January 11, 2025; 2:00 pm, FloHoops		at Drexel	W 93–82 ^{OT}	8–9 (3–1)	Daskalakis Athletic Center (1,436); Philadelphia, PA
January 16, 2025; 7:00 pm, CBSSN		Hofstra	W 65–60	9–9 (4–1)	TU Arena (2,016); Towson, MD
January 18, 2025; 2:00 pm, Monumental/FloHoops		Stony Brook	W 53–49	10–9 (5–1)	TU Arena (2,611); Towson, MD
January 23, 2025; 7:00 pm, FloHoops		North Carolina A&T	W 83–67	11–9 (6–1)	TU Arena (1,857); Towson, MD
January 27, 2025; 9:00 pm, CBSSN		at Northeastern	W 75–65	12–9 (7–1)	Matthews Arena (645); Boston, MA
January 30, 2025; 6:30 pm, FloHoops		at Delaware	W 76–66	13–9 (8–1)	Bob Carpenter Center (2,193); Newark, DE
February 1, 2025; 6:00 pm, CBSSN		Drexel	W 55–54	14–9 (9–1)	TU Arena (3,204); Towson, MD
February 6, 2025; 6:31 pm, FloHoops		at Stony Brook	W 66–59	15–9 (10–1)	Stony Brook Arena (1,526); Stony Brook, NY
February 8, 2025; 4:00 pm, CBSSN		at Monmouth	W 73–67	16–9 (11–1)	OceanFirst Bank Center (2,756); West Long Branch, NJ
February 13, 2025; 7:00 pm, Monumental/FloHoops		Delaware	W 75–70	17–9 (12–1)	TU Arena (3,302); Towson, MD
February 15, 2025; 2:00 pm, Monumental/FloHoops		Monmouth	W 80–54	18–9 (13–1)	TU Arena (3,104); Towson, MD
February 20, 2025; 7:00 pm, FloHoops		at Elon	L 63–69	18–10 (13–2)	Schar Center (1,859); Elon, NC
February 22, 2025; 2:00 pm, FloHoops		at Campbell	W 76–67	19–10 (14–2)	Gore Arena (2,171); Buies Creek, NC
February 27, 2025; 7:00 pm, Monumental/FloHoops		William & Mary	W 88–73	20–10 (15–2)	TU Arena (4,750); Towson, MD
March 1, 2025; 4:00 pm, Monumental/FloHoops		Hampton	W 75–72	21–10 (16–2)	TU Arena (4,705); Towson, MD
CAA tournament
March 9, 2025; 12:00 pm, FloHoops	(1)	vs. (8) Drexel; Quarterfinals	W 82–76	22–10	CareFirst Arena; Washington, D.C.
March 10, 2025; 6:00 pm, CBSSN	(1)	vs. (12) Delaware; Semifinals	L 72–82	22–11	CareFirst Arena; Washington, D.C.
*Non-conference game. ^{#}Rankings from AP Poll. (#) Tournament seedings in parentheses. All times are in Eastern.
