= 2024–25 Delaware Fightin' Blue Hens men's basketball team =

American college basketball season

2024–25 Delaware Fightin' Blue Hens men's basketball
- Conference: Coastal Athletic Association
- Record: 16–20 (5–13 CAA)
- Head coach: Martin Ingelsby (9th season)
- Associate head coach: Bill Phillips
- Assistant coaches: JJ Butler; Danny O'Connor; Christian Nunez
- Home arena: Bob Carpenter Center

2024–25 CAA men's basketball standings
	Conf.				Overall
Team	W		L	PCT	W		L	PCT
Towson	16	–	2	.889	22	–	11	.667
UNC Wilmington †	14	–	4	.778	27	–	8	.771
Charleston	13	–	5	.722	24	–	9	.727
William & Mary	11	–	7	.611	17	–	15	.531
Campbell	10	–	8	.556	15	–	17	.469
Monmouth	10	–	8	.556	13	–	20	.394
Northeastern	9	–	9	.500	17	–	15	.531
Drexel	9	–	9	.500	18	–	15	.545
Elon	8	–	10	.444	17	–	16	.515
Hampton	8	–	10	.444	17	–	16	.515
Hofstra	6	–	12	.333	15	–	18	.455
Delaware	5	–	13	.278	16	–	20	.444
Stony Brook	4	–	14	.222	8	–	24	.250
North Carolina A&T	3	–	15	.167	7	–	25	.219
† 2025 CAA tournament winner

The 2024–25 Delaware Fightin' Blue Hens men's basketball team represented the University of Delaware during the 2024–25 NCAA Division I men's basketball season. The Fightin' Blue Hens, led by ninth-year head coach Martin Ingelsby, played their home games at the Bob Carpenter Center in Newark, Delaware as members of the Coastal Athletic Association.

This was Delaware's final season as members of the Coastal Athletic Association, as they will be moving to Conference USA, starting in the 2025–26 season.

== Previous season ==
The Fightin' Blue Hens finished the 2023–24 season 19–14, 10–8 in CAA play to finish in a three-way tie for sixth place. They defeated Hampton, before falling to Hofstra in the quarterfinals of the CAA tournament.

== Roster ==
2024–25 Delaware Fightin' Blue Hens men's basketball team
Players
Coaches

Pos.	#	Name	Height	Weight	Year	Previous school	Hometown
F	00	Gabe Moss	6 ft 8 in (2.03 m)	218 lb (99 kg)	Jr	The Hill School	Pottstown, Pennsylvania
G	1	Izaiah Pasha	6 ft 4 in (1.93 m)	190 lb (86 kg)	Fr	Cardinal O'Hara HS	Harrisburg, Pennsylvania
F	2	John Camden	6 ft 8 in (2.03 m)	220 lb (100 kg)	Sr	Virginia Tech	Downingtown, Pennsylvania
G	3	Cavan Reilly	6 ft 4 in (1.93 m)	188 lb (85 kg)	Jr	Bishop O'Connell HS	Lovettsville, Virginia
G	4	Niels Lane	6 ft 5 in (1.96 m)	215 lb (98 kg)	Sr	Florida	Freehold, New Jersey
F	5	Macon Emory	6 ft 8 in (2.03 m)	185 lb (84 kg)	Fr	Perkiomen School	Devon, Pennsylvania
G	7	Tahron Allen	6 ft 5 in (1.96 m)	200 lb (91 kg)	Sr	Wagner	Brooklyn, New York
F	8	Kevin Kogbara	6 ft 8 in (2.03 m)	275 lb (125 kg)	Jr	Bishop State CC	Peoria, Arizona
G	10	Brandon Baffone	6 ft 1 in (1.85 m)	175 lb (79 kg)	So	Salesianum School	Hockessin, Delaware
G	11	Kobe Jerome	6 ft 4 in (1.93 m)	190 lb (86 kg)	Sr	UC Riverside	Harlem, New York
G	12	Alex McFadden	6 ft 1 in (1.85 m)	160 lb (73 kg)	Fr	Radnor HS	Wayne, Pennsylvania
G	13	Trent Middleton Jr.	6 ft 3 in (1.91 m)	180 lb (82 kg)	So	Ball State	Philadelphia, Pennsylvania
F	15	Houston Emory	6 ft 9 in (2.06 m)	195 lb (88 kg)	Jr	Blue Ridge School	Devon, Pennsylvania
G	20	Erik Timko	6 ft 5 in (1.96 m)	200 lb (91 kg)	GS	Jefferson	Audubon, Pennsylvania
F	44	Tyler Houser	6 ft 9 in (2.06 m)	235 lb (107 kg)	Jr	VMI	Camp Hill, Pennsylvania

Head coach

- Martin Ingelsby (Notre Dame)

Assistant coach(es)

- Bill Phillips (Saint Joseph's)
- JJ Butler (Lipscomb)
- Danny O'Connor (Indiana)
- Christian Nunez (Farmingdale State)

Legend

- (C) Team captain
- (S) Suspended
- (I) Ineligible
- (W) Walk-on
- Injured
- Current redshirt

Roster
Last update: October 30, 2024

== Schedule and results ==
Date time, TV	Rank^{#}	Opponent^{#}	Result	Record	Site (attendance) city, state
Non-conference regular season
November 4, 2024*; 6:30 pm, FloHoops		Bucknell	L 73–85	0–1	Bob Carpenter Center (1,775); Newark, DE
November 7, 2024*; 6:30 pm, FloHoops		Robert Morris	W 81–77	1–1	Bob Carpenter Center (1,402); Newark, DE
November 12, 2024*; 7:00 pm, ESPN+		at Iona	W 64–58	2–1	Hynes Athletics Center (2,028); New Rochelle, NY
November 18, 2024*; 6:30 pm, FloHoops		Bryant	L 84–85	2–2	Bob Carpenter Center (2,384); Newark, DE
November 23, 2024*; 12:00 pm, ESPN+		vs. Vermont; Hall of Fame Tip-Off	L 71–75	2–3	Mohegan Sun Arena; Uncasville, CT
November 24, 2024*; 6:00 pm, ESPNU		vs. Yale; Hall of Fame Tip-Off	W 100–94	3–3	Mohegan Sun Arena (3,124); Uncasville, CT
November 30, 2024*; 2:00 pm, ESPN+		at Rider	W 72–66	4–3	Alumni Gymnasium (1,328); Lawrenceville, NJ
December 3, 2024*; 6:30 pm, FloHoops		Delaware State	W 93–80	5–3	Bob Carpenter Center (2,104); Newark, DE
December 6, 2024*; 6:00 pm, ESPN+		at Duquesne	L 66–80	5–4	UPMC Cooper Fieldhouse (2,033); Pittsburgh, PA
December 10, 2024*; 6:30 pm, FloHoops		Chestnut Hill	W 78–58	6–4	Bob Carpenter Center (1,609); Newark, DE
December 17, 2024*; 11:00 am, FloHoops		Misericordia	W 92–75	7–4	Bob Carpenter Center (3,202); Newark, DE
December 20, 2024*; 7:00 pm, ESPN+		at Saint Peter's	L 64–72	7–5	Run Baby Run Arena (495); Jersey City, NJ
December 28, 2024*; 6:00 pm, FS1		at St. John's	L 76–97	7–6	Carnesecca Arena (5,602); Queens, NY
CAA regular season
January 2, 2025; 7:00 pm, FloHoops		at Northeastern	L 77–80	7–7 (0–1)	Matthews Arena (602); Boston, MA
January 4, 2025; 4:00 pm, FloHoops		Monmouth	W 84–64	8–7 (1–1)	Bob Carpenter Center (1,981); Newark, DE
January 9, 2025; 7:00 pm, FloHoops		at North Carolina A&T	W 98–88	9–7 (2–1)	Corbett Sports Center (708); Greensboro, NC
January 11, 2025; 2:00 pm, FloHoops		at Hampton	L 77–83	9–8 (2–2)	Hampton Convocation Center (527); Hampton, VA
January 16, 2025; 6:30 pm, FloHoops		Stony Brook	W 84–74	10–8 (2–3)	Bob Carpenter Center (1,443); Newark, DE
January 18, 2025; 2:00 pm, FloHoops		Elon	W 79–77	11–8 (4–2)	Bob Carpenter Center (2,262); Newark, DE
January 23, 2025; 7:00 pm, FloHoops		at Hofstra	L 68–93	11–9 (4–3)	Mack Sports Complex (1,502); Hempstead, NY
January 25, 2025; 2:00 pm, FloHoops		at Drexel	L 54–67	11–10 (4–4)	Daskalakis Athletic Center (2,446); Philadelphia, PA
January 30, 2025; 6:30 pm, FloHoops		Towson	L 66–76	11–11 (4–5)	Bob Carpenter Center (2,193); Newark, DE
February 1, 2025; 2:00 pm, FloHoops		at Monmouth	L 83–92	11–12 (4–6)	OceanFirst Bank Center (2,586); West Long Branch, NJ
February 6, 2025; 6:30 pm, FloHoops		UNC Wilmington	L 67–77	11–13 (4–7)	Bob Carpenter Center (2,031); Newark, DE
February 8, 2025; 2:00 pm, FloHoops		William & Mary	W 74–64	12–13 (5–7)	Bob Carpenter Center (2,405); Newark, DE
February 13, 2025; 7:00 pm, FloHoops		at Towson	L 70–75	12–14 (5–8)	TU Arena (3,302); Towson, MD
February 15, 2025; 4:00 pm, FloHoops		Campbell	L 91–96	12–15 (5–9)	Bob Carpenter Center (2,347); Newark, DE
February 20, 2025; 6:30 pm, FloHoops		Drexel	L 74–78	12–16 (5–10)	Bob Carpenter Center (1,951); Newark, DE
February 22, 2025; 4:00 pm, FloHoops		Hofstra	L 65–78	12–17 (5–11)	Bob Carpenter Center (2,261); Newark, DE
February 27, 2025; 7:00 pm, FloHoops		at Charleston	L 84–94	12–18 (5–12)	TD Arena (4,939); Charleston, SC
March 1, 2025; 7:00 pm, FloHoops		at UNC Wilmington	L 58–88	12–19 (5–13)	Trask Coliseum (5,200); Wilmington, NC
CAA tournament
March 7, 2025; 2:00 pm, FloHoops	(12)	vs. (13) Stony Brook; First round	W 80–76	13–19	CareFirst Arena; Washington, D.C.
March 8, 2025; 2:30 pm, FloHoops	(12)	vs. (5) Campbell; Second round	W 79–62	14–19	CareFirst Arena (2,310); Washington, D.C.
March 9, 2025; 2:30 pm, FloHoops	(12)	vs. (4) William & Mary; Quarterfinals	W 100–78	15–19	CareFirst Arena (2,878); Washington, D.C.
March 10, 2025; 6:00 pm, CBSSN	(12)	vs. (1) Towson; Semifinals	W 82–72	16–19	CareFirst Arena; Washington, D.C.
March 11, 2025; 7:00 pm, CBSSN	(12)	vs. (2) UNC Wilmington; Championship	L 72–76	16–20	CareFirst Arena; Washington, D.C.
*Non-conference game. ^{#}Rankings from AP Poll. (#) Tournament seedings in parentheses. All times are in Eastern.
