= Đorđe Ćurčić (basketball, born 2004) =

Serbian basketball player

No. 44 – Charleston Cougars
- Position: Point guard / shooting guard
- League: Coastal Athletic Association

Personal information
- Born: 10 July 2004 (age 22) Čačak, Serbia and Montenegro
- Listed height: 1.91 m (6 ft 3 in)

Career information
- College: Saint Louis (2023–2024); Charleston (2024–present)
- Playing career: 2020–present

Career history
- 2020–2023: Borac Čačak
- 2021–2022: →Čačak 94
Medals
Men's basketball
Representing Serbia
FIBA U18 European Championship
Bronze medal – third place	2022 Turkey	Team

Đorđe Ćurčić (Serbian Cyrillic: Ђорђе Ћурчић; born 10 July 2004), also credited to as Đorđe V. Ćurčić, is a Serbian college basketball player for the Charleston Cougars of the Coastal Athletic Association. Standing at 1.88 m (6 ft 2 in), he plays both guards positions.

== Career ==
Ćurčić grew up with a youth system of his hometown club Borac. On 25 September 2021, Ćurčić made his ABA League debut in a 91–89 loss to Igokea m:tel with no records in 3 minutes of playing time. Ćurčić played 18 games for the Saint Louis Billikens during the 2023–24 college basketball season, averaging 2.8 points and 2.9 rebounds before transferring to the Charleston Cougars for his sophomore season.

== National team career ==
In August 2021, Ćurčić was a member of the Serbia U-18 at the FIBA U18 European Challengers in Skopje, North Macedonia. Over five tournament games, he averaged 12.6 points, 2.4 rebounds, and 2.8 assists per game. In July and August 2022, Ćurčić was a member of the under-18 team at the FIBA U18 European Championship in İzmir, Turkey. Over seven tournament games, he averaged 10.9 points, 3.0 rebounds, and 1.4 assists per game.

== Career statistics ==
Legend
GP	Games played	GS	Games started	MPG	Minutes per game
FG%	Field goal percentage	3P%	3-point field goal percentage	FT%	Free throw percentage
RPG	Rebounds per game	APG	Assists per game	SPG	Steals per game
BPG	Blocks per game	PPG	Points per game	**Bold**	Career high

=== College ===
Year	Team	GP	GS	MPG	FG%	3P%	FT%	RPG	APG	SPG	BPG	PPG
2023–24	Saint Louis	18	0	**9.8**	**.528**	**.429**	**1.00**	0.4	**0.5**	**0.5**	**0.1**	**2.9**
2024–25	Charleston	**23**	**1**	9.4	.333	.310	.833	**0.8**	0.2	0.3	0.0	2.2
Career		41	1	9.6	.417	.357	.889	0.6	0.3	0.4	0.0	2.5
