= Je'lon Hornbeak =

American basketball player and coach

Monmouth Hawks
- Position: Assistant coach
- League: Coastal Athletic Association

Personal information
- Born: May 1, 1994 (age 32) Long Beach, California, U.S.
- Listed height: 6 ft 3 in (1.91 m)
- Listed weight: 190 lb (86 kg)

Career information
- High school: Grace Prep (Arlington, Texas)
- College: Oklahoma (2012–2014); Monmouth (2015–2017)
- NBA draft: 2017: undrafted
- Playing career: 2017–2019
- Coaching career: 2024–present

Career history

Playing
- 2017–2019: Fort Wayne Mad Ants

Coaching
- 2024–present: Monmouth (assistant)

Je'lon Ajani Hornbeak (born May 1, 1994) is an American basketball coach and former player who is currently an assistant coach at his alma mater, Monmouth University.

== College career ==
=== Oklahoma (2012–2014) ===
Hornbeak was a four-star recruit out of Grace Prep and committed to Oklahoma. He played two seasons for the Sooners and was a part of two NCAA Tournament teams. Hornbeak averaged 5.1 points and 2.6 assists as a sophomore coming off the bench after starting most of his freshman year.

=== Monmouth (2015-2017) ===
After his sophomore season he transferred to Monmouth and sat out a season per NCAA regulations, undergoing surgery on his right foot in October 2014.

On December 15, 2015, Hornbeak scored a season-high 18 points in an 83–68 upset of Georgetown.

Hornbeak was indefinitely suspended by coach King Rice for conduct detrimental to the team on January 2, 2016. He returned to the lineup on January 12, helping fill in for Deon Jones, who missed five games with a hand injury. Hornbeak averaged 8.9 points per game as a redshirt junior, helping the team to a 28–8 record and NIT berth. As a senior, Hornbeak averaged 11.9 points, 4.3 rebounds, 1.8 assists and 1.5 steals per game.

== Professional career ==
After going undrafted in the 2017 NBA draft, Hornbeak attended an open tryout for the Fort Wayne Mad Ants of the NBA G League in September and made the team. He scored 18 points in a 104–77 victory over Raptors 905 in November. On February 14, 2019, Hornbeak was suspended five games for violating the league's anti-drug policy.

== Coaching career ==
Hornbeak returned to Monmouth in 2024 as an assistant coach.
