= 2023–24 St. Bonaventure Bonnies men's basketball team =

American college basketball season

2023–24 St. Bonaventure Bonnies men's basketball
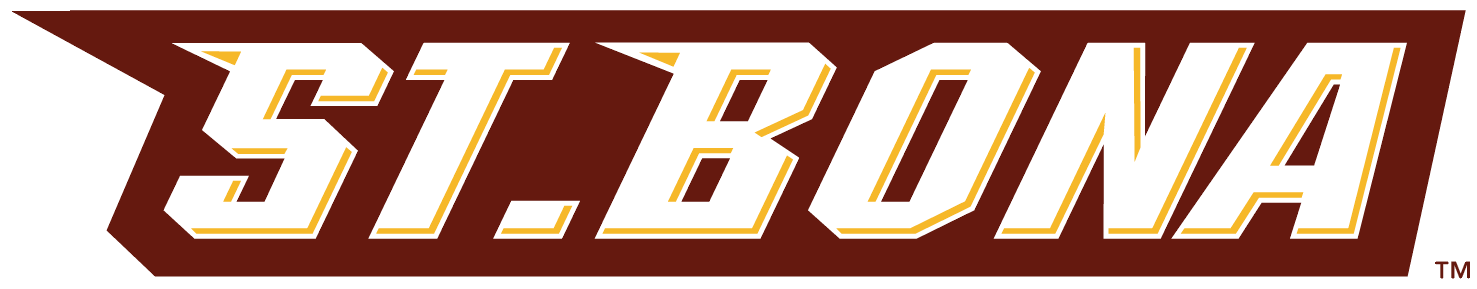
- Conference: Atlantic 10 Conference
- Record: 20–13 (9–9 A–10)
- Head coach: Mark Schmidt (17th season)
- Associate head coach: Sean Neal
- Assistant coaches: Chris Lowe; Dana Valentine
- Home arena: Reilly Center

2023–24 Atlantic 10 men's basketball standings
	Conf.				Overall
Team	W		L	PCT	W		L	PCT
Richmond	15	–	3	.833	23	–	10	.697
Loyola Chicago	15	–	3	.833	23	–	10	.697
No. 24 Dayton	14	–	4	.778	25	–	8	.758
UMass	11	–	7	.611	20	–	11	.645
VCU	11	–	7	.611	24	–	14	.632
Duquesne †	10	–	8	.556	25	–	12	.676
St. Bonaventure	9	–	9	.500	20	–	13	.606
George Mason	9	–	9	.500	20	–	12	.625
Saint Joseph's	9	–	9	.500	21	–	14	.600
La Salle	6	–	12	.333	16	–	17	.485
Rhode Island	6	–	12	.333	12	–	20	.375
Fordham	6	–	12	.333	13	–	20	.394
Davidson	5	–	13	.278	15	–	17	.469
Saint Louis	5	–	13	.278	13	–	20	.394
George Washington	4	–	14	.222	15	–	17	.469
† 2024 A-10 tournament winner Rankings from AP poll

The 2023–24 St. Bonaventure Bonnies men's basketball team represented St. Bonaventure University during the 2023–24 NCAA Division I men's basketball season. The Bonnies, led by 17th-year head coach Mark Schmidt, played their home games at the Reilly Center in Olean, New York as members of the Atlantic 10 Conference.

== Previous season ==
The Bonnies finished the 2022–23 season 14–18, 8–10 in A-10 Play to finish in a 3 way tie for eighth place. As a 9th seed, they lost in the second round to Davidson of the A–10 Tournament.

== Offseason ==
=== Departures ===
Name	Number	Pos.	Height	Weight	Year	Hometown	Reason for departure
Max Amadasun	10	C	6'9"	250	RS Sophomore	Dublin, Ireland	Transferred to Augusta
Anouar Mellouk	11	F	6'8"	205	RS Freshman	Almere, Netherlands	Transferred to Odessa College
Brett Rumpel	24	G	6'4"	190	Freshman	Binghamton, NY	Transferred to Manhattan
Anquan Hill	35	F	6'9"	200	Sophomore	Philadelphia, PA	Transferred to Sacred Heart

=== Incoming transfers ===
Name	Number	Pos.	Height	Weight	Year	Hometown	Previous School
Mika Adams-Woods	3	G	6'3'	180	GS Senior	Syracuse, NY	Cincinnati
Charles Pride	5	G	6'4"	200	GS Senior	Syracuse, NY	Bryant
Noel Brown	20	C	6'11"	260	RS Junior	Leesburg, VA	George Washington

=== Recruiting classes ===
==== 2023 recruiting class ====
College recruiting information
Name	Hometown	School	Height	Weight	Commit date
Miles Rose; SG	Rochester, NY	Putnam Science Academy	6 ft 4 in (1.93 m)	185 lb (84 kg)	Sep 16, 2022
Miles Rose; SG	Recruit ratings: No ratings found				
Duane Thompson; PF	Rochester, NY	Putnam Science Academy	6 ft 8 in (2.03 m)	215 lb (98 kg)	May 7, 2023
Duane Thompson; PF	Recruit ratings: No ratings found				
Overall recruit ranking:
Note: In many cases, Scout, Rivals, 247Sports, On3, and ESPN may conflict in their listings of height and weight.; In these cases, the average was taken. ESPN grades are on a 100-point scale.; Sources: "2023 Team Ranking". Rivals.

==== 2024 recruiting class ====
College recruiting information (2024)
Name	Hometown	School	Height	Weight	Commit date
Ebrahim Kaba; SF	East Orange, NJ	The Peddie School	6 ft 9 in (2.06 m)	200 lb (91 kg)	Jun 23, 2023
Ebrahim Kaba; SF	Recruit ratings: No ratings found				
Overall recruit ranking:
Note: In many cases, Scout, Rivals, 247Sports, On3, and ESPN may conflict in their listings of height and weight.; In these cases, the average was taken. ESPN grades are on a 100-point scale.; Sources: "2024 Team Ranking". Rivals.

== Roster ==
2023–24 St. Bonaventure Bonnies men's basketball team
Players
Coaches

Pos.	#	Name	Height	Weight	Year	Previous school	Hometown
F	0	Barry Evans	6 ft 8 in (2.03 m)	215 lb (98 kg)	So	Putnam Science Academy	Baltimore, Maryland
G	1	Kyrell Luc	5 ft 11 in (1.8 m)	165 lb (75 kg)	Jr	Holy Cross	Dorchester, Massachusetts
F	2	Yann Farell	6 ft 6 in (1.98 m)	210 lb (95 kg)	So	Keystone Academy (PA)	Libreville, Gabon
G	3	Mika Adams-Woods	6 ft 3 in (1.91 m)	180 lb (82 kg)	GS	Cincinnati	Syracuse, New York
G	4	Moses Flowers	6 ft 3 in (1.91 m)	185 lb (84 kg)	RS Sr	Hartford	Dorchester, Massachusetts
G	5	Daryl Banks III	6 ft 3 in (1.91 m)	175 lb (79 kg)	RS Sr	Saint Peter's	Los Angeles, California
G	7	Charles Pride	6 ft 4 in (1.93 m)	200 lb (91 kg)	GS	Bryant	Syracuse, New York
G	10	Miles Rose	6 ft 4 in (1.93 m)	190 lb (86 kg)	Fr	Putnam Science Academy	Rochester, New York
F	11	Duane Thompson	6 ft 8 in (2.03 m)	205 lb (93 kg)	Fr	Putnam Science Academy	Boston, Massachusetts
G	15	Jack DeRose (W)	6 ft 0 in (1.83 m)	172 lb (78 kg)	Fr	Olean High School	Olean, New York
C	20	Noel Brown	6 ft 11 in (2.11 m)	265 lb (120 kg)	RS Jr	George Washington	Leesburg, Virginia
F/C	21	Melian Martinez	6 ft 10 in (2.08 m)	225 lb (102 kg)	RS Fr	North Florida Educational Institute	Santo Domingo, Dominican Republic
G	23	Anthony Belardinelli (W)	6 ft 3 in (1.91 m)	185 lb (84 kg)	Sr	Northern Highlands High School	Upper Saddle River, New Jersey
G	30	Broek Ostrom (W)	6 ft 2 in (1.88 m)	185 lb (84 kg)	So	Holley Jr. Sr. High School	Holley, New York
F	32	Chad Venning	6 ft 10 in (2.08 m)	255 lb (116 kg)	RS Jr	Morgan State	Brooklyn, New York

Head coach

- Mark Schmidt (Boston College)

Assistant coach(es)

- Sean Neal (La Salle)
- Chris Lowe (UMass)
- Dana Valentine (Worcester State)

Legend

- (C) Team captain
- (S) Suspended
- (I) Ineligible
- (W) Walk-on
- Injured
- Current redshirt

Roster

== Schedule and results ==
Date time, TV	Rank^{#}	Opponent^{#}	Result	Record	High points	High rebounds	High assists	Site (attendance) city, state
Exhibition
November 1, 2023*; 7:00 p.m., ESPN+		Alfred	W 80–41		12 – Flowers	9 – Brown	6 – Banks III	Reilly Center (2,536); St. Bonaventure, NY
Non-conference regular season
November 6, 2023*; 7:00 p.m., ESPN+		Longwood	W 73–69	1–0	21 – Pride	11 – Zapala	4 – Napper	Reilly Center (3,577); St. Bonaventure, NY
November 11, 2023*; 4:00 p.m., ESPN+		Canisius	L 67–70	1–1	16 – Pride	9 – Pride	4 – Adams-Woods	Reilly Center (4,850); St. Bonaventure, NY
November 16, 2023*; 6:30 p.m., ESPNU		vs. Oklahoma State; Legends Classic semifinals	W 66–64	2–1	17 – Adams-Woods	7 – Tied	4 – Banks	Barclays Center; Brooklyn, NY
November 17, 2023*; 7:00 p.m., ESPN2		vs. Auburn; Legends Classic championship	L 60–77	2–2	14 – Venning	7 – Evans	3 – Tied	Barclays Center (4,849); Brooklyn, NY
November 22, 2023*; 7:00 p.m., ESPN+		Bucknell	W 67–61	3–2	16 – Adams-Woods	7 – Pride	5 – Pride	Reilly Center (3,497); St. Bonaventure, NY
November 25, 2023*; 2:00 p.m., ESPN+		Miami (OH)	W 90–60	4–2	18 – Pride	7 – Pride	8 – Adams-Woods	Reilly Center (3,433); St. Bonaventure, NY
December 2, 2023*; 2:00 p.m., ESPN+		at Buffalo	W 80–65	5–2	23 – Venning	8 – Evans	8 – Adams-Woods	Alumni Arena (3,324); Amherst, NY
December 6, 2023*; 7:00 p.m., ESPN+		at Niagara	W 94–60	6–2	25 – Adams-Woods	10 – Evans	5 – Adams-Woods	Gallagher Center (1,494); Lewiston, NY
December 9, 2023*; 4:00 p.m., ESPN+		Siena; Franciscan Cup	W 89–56	7–2	23 – Adams-Woods	12 – Essamvous	4 – Tied	Reilly Center (4,022); St. Bonaventure, NY
December 16, 2023*; 4:00 p.m., ESPNU		vs. No. 15 Florida Atlantic; Basketball Hall of Fame Classic	L 54–64	7–3	12 – Flowers	7 – Tied	4 – Luc	MassMutual Center (2,745); Springfield, MA
December 22, 2023*; 7:00 p.m., ESPN+		Binghamton	W 90–64	8–3	25 – Flowers	8 – Evans	6 – Adams-Woods	Reilly Center (3,965); St. Bonaventure, NY
December 30, 2023*; 4:00 p.m., ESPN+		vs. Akron; Legends of Basketball Showcase	W 62–61	9–3	14 – Venning	10 – Tied	2 – Pride	Rocket Mortgage FieldHouse; Cleveland, OH
A-10 regular season
January 3, 2024; 9:00 p.m., CBSSN		at VCU	W 89–78	10–3 (1–0)	19 – Venning	11 – Venning	3 – Banks III	Siegel Center (6,348); Richmond, VA
January 6, 2024; 4:00 p.m., ESPN+		at Richmond	L 54–65	10–4 (1–1)	15 – Flowers	8 – Pride	3 – Pride	Robins Center (6,619); Richmond, VA
January 13, 2024; 2:30 p.m., USA		Fordham	L 74–80	10–5 (1–2)	22 – Venning	11 – Pride	2 – Tied	Reilly Center (3,819); St. Bonaventure, NY
January 17, 2024; 7:00 p.m., ESPN+		Rhode Island	W 99–64	11–5 (2–2)	25 – Pride	9 – Essamvous	5 – Adams-Woods	Reilly Center (3,881); St. Bonaventure, NY
January 20, 2024; 2:00 p.m., ESPN+		at George Mason	L 60–69	11–6 (2–3)	17 – Venning	9 – Evans	2 – Tied	EagleBank Arena (4,614); Fairfax, VA
January 23, 2024; 7:00 p.m., ESPN+		at Duquesne	L 50–54	11–7 (2–4)	14 – Pride	8 – Essamvous	1 – Tied	UPMC Cooper Fieldhouse (2,489); Pittsburgh, PA
January 26, 2024; 8:30 p.m., ESPN2		Saint Joseph's	W 91–72	12–7 (3–4)	29 – Banks III	7 – Evans	6 – Evans	Reilly Center (4,396); St. Bonaventure, NY
January 30, 2024; 7:00 p.m., CBSSN		VCU	W 67–62	13–7 (4–4)	15 – Banks III	10 – Pride	5 – Pride	Reilly Center (3,901); St. Bonaventure, NY
February 2, 2024; 7:00 p.m., ESPN2		at No. 21 Dayton	L 71–76	13–8 (4–5)	17 – Adams-Woods	11 – Pride	4 – Pride	UD Arena (13,407); Dayton, OH
February 7, 2024; 7:00 p.m., NBC Sports App		UMass	W 79–73	14–8 (5–5)	19 – Pride	8 – Essamvous	3 – Essamvous	Reilly Center (3,748); St. Bonaventure, NY
February 10, 2024; 2:00 p.m., ESPNU		Duquesne	L 69–75	14–9 (5–6)	22 – Pride	8 – Tied	4 – Banks III	Reilly Center (4,750); St. Bonaventure, NY
February 14, 2024; 7:00 p.m., ESPN+		at Fordham	W 85–67	15–9 (6–6)	23 – Essamvous	6 – Flowers	10 – Adams-Woods	Rose Hill Gymnasium (1,520); Bronx, NY
February 17, 2024; 3:30 p.m., CBSSN		Davidson	W 81–80 ^{OT}	16–9 (7–6)	15 – Tied	6 – Banks III	5 – Adams-Woods	Reilly Center (4,750); St. Bonaventure, NY
February 21, 2024; 6:30 p.m., ESPN+		at La Salle	L 59–72	16–10 (7–7)	22 – Venning	6 – Adams-Woods	5 – Adams-Woods	Tom Gola Arena (1,439); Philadelphia, PA
February 24, 2024; 2:30 p.m., USA		at UMass	W 75–67	17–10 (8–7)	16 – Venning	10 – Venning	5 – Tied	Mullins Center (7,016); Amherst, MA
February 27, 2024; 7:00 p.m., ESPN+		Loyola Chicago	W 79–64	18–10 (9–7)	26 – Banks III	8 – Flowers	4 – Flowers	Reilly Center (3,855); St. Bonaventure, NY
March 6, 2024; 7:00 p.m., ESPN+		at George Washington	L 75–86	18–11 (9–8)	23 – Banks III	6 – Essamvous	5 – Adams-Woods	Charles E. Smith Center (1,428); Washington, D.C.
March 9, 2024; 12:30 p.m., USA		Saint Louis	L 65–73	18–12 (9–9)	17 – Adams-Woods	6 – Evans	2 – Tied	Reilly Center (4,702); St. Bonaventure, NY
A-10 tournament
March 13, 2024; 5:00 p.m., USA	(7)	vs. (10) La Salle; Second round	W 75–73	19–12	15 – Adams-Woods	9 – Essamvous	6 – Adams-Woods	Barclays Center; Brooklyn, NY
March 14, 2024; 5:00 p.m., USA	(7)	vs. (2) Loyola Chicago; Quarterfinals	W 75–74 ^{2OT}	20–12	22 – Banks III	8 – Banks III	2 – Tied	Barclays Center; Brooklyn, NY
March 16, 2024; 3:30 p.m., CBSSN	(7)	vs. (6) Duquesne; Semifinals	L 60–70	20–13	14 – Banks III	7 – Evans	5 – Adams-Woods	Barclays Center (8,037); Brooklyn, NY
*Non-conference game. ^{#}Rankings from AP Poll. (#) Tournament seedings in parentheses. All times are in Eastern Time.
