= 2023–24 Fordham Rams men's basketball team =

American college basketball season

2023–24 Fordham Rams men's basketball
- Conference: Atlantic 10
- Record: 13–20 (6–12 A–10)
- Head coach: Keith Urgo (2nd season)
- Associate head coach: Tray Woodall
- Assistant coaches: Ronald Ramón; Henry Lowe
- Home arena: Rose Hill Gymnasium

2023–24 Atlantic 10 men's basketball standings
	Conf.				Overall
Team	W		L	PCT	W		L	PCT
Richmond	15	–	3	.833	23	–	10	.697
Loyola Chicago	15	–	3	.833	23	–	10	.697
No. 24 Dayton	14	–	4	.778	25	–	8	.758
UMass	11	–	7	.611	20	–	11	.645
VCU	11	–	7	.611	24	–	14	.632
Duquesne †	10	–	8	.556	25	–	12	.676
St. Bonaventure	9	–	9	.500	20	–	13	.606
George Mason	9	–	9	.500	20	–	12	.625
Saint Joseph's	9	–	9	.500	21	–	14	.600
La Salle	6	–	12	.333	16	–	17	.485
Rhode Island	6	–	12	.333	12	–	20	.375
Fordham	6	–	12	.333	13	–	20	.394
Davidson	5	–	13	.278	15	–	17	.469
Saint Louis	5	–	13	.278	13	–	20	.394
George Washington	4	–	14	.222	15	–	17	.469
† 2024 A-10 tournament winner Rankings from AP poll

The 2023–24 Fordham Rams men's basketball team represented Fordham University during the 2023–24 NCAA Division I men's basketball season. The Rams, led by second-year head coach Keith Urgo, played their home games at Rose Hill Gymnasium in The Bronx, New York as a member of the Atlantic 10 Conference.

== Previous season ==
This was the Rams' first 20-win season since the 1990–91 season. The Rams finished the 2022–23 season 25–8, 12–6 in A-10 Play for a three-way tie for 2nd place. They defeated La Salle in the quarterfinals of the Atlantic 10 Tournament before losing to Dayton in the semifinals. Despite having 25 wins, they didn’t participate in a postseason tournament.

== Offseason ==
=== Departures ===
Name	Number	Pos.	Height	Weight	Year	Hometown	Reason for departure
Khalid Moore	2	F	6'7"	208	GS Senior	Briarwood, NY	Graduated
Darius Quisenberry	3	G	6'1"	188	GS Senior	Springfield, OH	Graduated
Rostyslav Novitskyi	15	C	6'10"	225	Senior	Kyiv, Ukraine	Left the team for personal reasons
Patrick Kelly	23	F	6'8"	223	RS Sophomore	Raeligh, NC	Left the team for personal reasons
Lake Hardenburg	25	G	6'6"	183	Freshman	Dallas, TX	Walk-on; transferred

=== Incoming transfers ===
Name	Number	Pos.	Height	Weight	Year	Hometown	Previous School
Japhet Medor	0	G	6'0"	168	RS Senior	Wellington, FL	UTSA
Ogheneyole Akuwovo	15	F	6'9"	220	GS Senior	Delta State, Nigeria	Binghamton
Josh Rivera	55	F	6'7"	220	Sophomore	New Brunswick, NJ	Lafayette

=== Recruiting classes ===
==== 2023 recruiting class ====
College recruiting information
Name	Hometown	School	Height	Weight	Commit date
Jahmere Tripp #46 SF	Brooklyn, NY	Collegiate School	6 ft 5 in (1.96 m)	220 lb (100 kg)	Nov 1, 2022
Jahmere Tripp #46 SF	Recruit ratings: Rivals: 247Sports: ESPN: (79)				
Overall recruit ranking:
Note: In many cases, Scout, Rivals, 247Sports, On3, and ESPN may conflict in their listings of height and weight.; In these cases, the average was taken. ESPN grades are on a 100-point scale.; Sources: "2023 Team Ranking". Rivals.

==== 2024 recruiting class ====
College recruiting information (2024)
Name	Hometown	School	Height	Weight	Commit date
Ryan Pettis; CG	San Mateo, CA	Junipero Serra High School	6 ft 2 in (1.88 m)	170 lb (77 kg)	Oct 18, 2023
Ryan Pettis; CG	Recruit ratings: No ratings found				
Overall recruit ranking:
Note: In many cases, Scout, Rivals, 247Sports, On3, and ESPN may conflict in their listings of height and weight.; In these cases, the average was taken. ESPN grades are on a 100-point scale.; Sources: "2024 Team Ranking". Rivals.

== Roster ==
2023–24 Fordham Rams men's basketball team
Players
Coaches

Pos.	#	Name	Height	Weight	Year	Previous school	Hometown
G	0	Japhet Medor	6 ft 0 in (1.83 m)	165 lb (75 kg)	RS Sr	UTSA	Wellington, Florida
G	1	Will Richardson	6 ft 3 in (1.91 m)	170 lb (77 kg)	So	Bergen Catholic High School	Teaneck, New Jersey
F	2	Romad Dean	6 ft 7 in (2.01 m)	210 lb (95 kg)	So	Mount Saint Michael Academy	Freeport, Bahamas
G/F	3	Jahmere Tripp	6 ft 6 in (1.98 m)	230 lb (104 kg)	Fr	Our Saviour Lutheran	Brooklyn, New York
G	4	Noah Best	6 ft 5 in (1.96 m)	175 lb (79 kg)	RS Fr	Mount Saint Michael Academy	Bronx, New York
F	5	Angel Montas	6 ft 6 in (1.98 m)	228 lb (103 kg)	So	Life Christian Academy (FL)	La Romana, DR
G	10	Kyle Rose	6 ft 4 in (1.93 m)	192 lb (87 kg)	Sr	Eleanor Roosevelt High School	Upper Marlboro, Maryland
F	12	Elijah Gray	6 ft 8 in (2.03 m)	220 lb (100 kg)	So	Hargrave Military Academy	Charlotte, NC
G	13	Zach Riley	6 ft 5 in (1.96 m)	195 lb (88 kg)	Jr	Rangitoto College	Auckland, New Zealand
G	14	Albe Evans (W)	5 ft 11 in (1.8 m)	160 lb (73 kg)	Sr	Schuylkill Haven High School	Schuylkill Haven, Pennsylvania
F	15	Ogheneyole Akuwovo	6 ft 9 in (2.06 m)	220 lb (100 kg)	GS	Binghamton	Delta State, Nigeria
G	22	Brian Nussbaum (W)	6 ft 2 in (1.88 m)	165 lb (75 kg)	Jr	The Winchendon School	South Salem, New York
G	24	Antrell Charlton	6 ft 5 in (1.96 m)	205 lb (93 kg)	Sr	Seward County Community College	Live Oak, Florida
F	30	Abdou Tsimbila	6 ft 9 in (2.06 m)	245 lb (111 kg)	Sr	Penn State	Yaoundé, Cameroon
G	31	Wayne Franklin (W)	6 ft 1 in (1.85 m)	185 lb (84 kg)	So	Paramus Catholic High School	Paramus, New Jersey
F	55	Joshua Rivera	6 ft 6 in (1.98 m)	215 lb (98 kg)	So	Lafayette	New Brunswick, New Jersey

Head coach

- Keith Urgo (Fairfield)

Assistant coach(es)

- Tray Woodall (Pittsburgh)
- Ronald Ramón (Pittsburgh)
- Henry Lowe (Villanova)

Legend

- (C) Team captain
- (S) Suspended
- (I) Ineligible
- (W) Walk-on
- Injured
- Current redshirt

Roster

== Schedule and results ==
Date time, TV	Rank^{#}	Opponent^{#}	Result	Record	High points	High rebounds	High assists	Site (attendance) city, state
Exhibition
October 29, 2023*; 4:00 p.m.		UMBC	W 79–75		23 – Medor	14 – Rivera	3 – Tied	Rose Hill Gymnasium; Bronx, NY
Non-conference regular season
November 6, 2023*; 7:00 p.m., SNY/ESPN+		Wagner	W 68–64 ^{OT}	1–0	17 – Medor	8 – Tsimbila	6 – Medor	Rose Hill Gymnasium (1,837); Bronx, NY
November 11, 2023*; 1:00 p.m., SNY/ESPN+		Cornell	L 73–78	1–1	17 – Medor	7 – Rivera	3 – Rose	Rose Hill Gymnasium (1,414); Bronx, NY
November 17, 2023*; 1:00 p.m., ESPN+		vs. Norfolk State; Paradise Jam First Round	W 77–64	2–1	16 – Tsimbila	9 – Tsimbila	3 – Richardson	Sports and Fitness Center (524); Saint Thomas, USVI
November 19, 2023*; 5:45 p.m., ESPN+		vs. Abilene Christian; Paradise Jam Semifinals	L 45–59	2–2	11 – Tsimbila	11 – Tsimbila	2 – Richardson	Sports and Fitness Center; Saint Thomas, USVI
November 20, 2023*; 5:45 p.m., ESPN+		at Kent State; Paradise Jam 3rd Place Game	L 72–79	2–3	18 – Medor	7 – Rivera	3 – Charlton	Sports and Fitness Center; Saint Thomas, USVI
November 27, 2023*; 7:00 p.m., SNY/ESPN+		Manhattan; Battle of the Bronx	W 93–61	3–3	16 – Medor	9 – Tsimbila	6 – Medor	Rose Hill Gymnasium (1,873); Bronx, NY
November 30, 2023*; 7:00 p.m., SNY/ESPN+		Fairleigh Dickinson	W 80–54	4–3	13 – Rivera	7 – Tied	4 – Tied	Rose Hill Gymnasium (1,320); Bronx, NY
December 3, 2023*; 12:00 p.m., SNY/ESPN+		Tulane	L 81–89	4–4	18 – Charlton	14 – Tsimbila	6 – Rose	Rose Hill Gymnasium (1,481); Bronx, NY
December 6, 2023*; 7:00 p.m., SNY/ESPN+		NJIT	L 77–80	4–5	18 – Tsimbila	14 – Tsimbila	8 – Charlton	Rose Hill Gymnasium (1,503); Bronx, NY
December 10, 2023*; 11:30 a.m., YES		vs. North Texas; NABC Brooklyn Showcase	W 60–59	5–5	10 – Charlton	6 – Tied	4 – Tied	Barclays Center; Brooklyn, NY
December 16, 2023*; 3:30 p.m., FS1		at St. John's; MSG Holiday Festival/Rivalry	L 55–77	5–6	15 – Rivera	7 – Tied	4 – Medor	Madison Square Garden (12,720); New York, NY
December 21, 2023*; 12:00 p.m., SNY/ESPN+		Central Connecticut	L 80–82	5–7	23 – Medor	9 – Tsimbila	4 – Tied	Rose Hill Gymnasium (2,800); Bronx, NY
December 30, 2023*; 1:00 p.m., SNY/ESPN+		Columbia	W 87–78	6–7	16 – Medor	9 – Rose	4 – Richardson	Rose Hill Gymnasium (1,969); Bronx, NY
Atlantic 10 regular season
January 3, 2024; 7:00 p.m., ESPN+		at George Washington	W 119–113 ^{3OT}	7–7 (1–0)	24 – Medor	9 – Rose	6 – Richardson	Charles E. Smith Center (1,258); Washington, D.C.
January 6, 2024; 12:00 p.m., USA		La Salle	L 76–81	7–8 (1–1)	18 – Gray	7 – Gray	4 – Richardson	Rose Hill Gymnasium (1,246); Bronx, NY
January 13, 2024; 2:30 p.m., USA		at St. Bonaventure	W 80–74	8–8 (2–1)	19 – Rose	7 – Tied	3 – Charlton	Reilly Center (3,819); Olean, NY
January 17, 2024; 7:00 p.m., ESPN+		Davidson	L 69–79	8–9 (2–2)	16 – Richardson	11 – Gray	5 – Charlton	Rose Hill Gymnasium (2,131); Bronx, NY
January 20, 2024; 1:00 p.m., SNY/ESPN+		Loyola Chicago	L 61–65	8–10 (2–3)	15 – Gray	6 – Charlton	3 – Tied	Rose Hill Gymnasium (1,756); Bronx, NY
January 24, 2024; 7:00 p.m., ESPN+		at Rhode Island	W 71–68	9–10 (3–3)	24 – Rose	6 – Rose	6 – Charlton	Ryan Center (4,703); Kingston, RI
January 27, 2024; 12:30 p.m., USA		at Duquesne	L 59–68	9–11 (3–4)	19 – Gray	9 – Rose	4 – Charlton	UPMC Cooper Fieldhouse (3,027); Pittsburgh, PA
January 31, 2024; 7:00 p.m., SNY/ESPN+		Richmond	L 69–83	9–12 (3–5)	16 – Richardson	7 – Rose	4 – Richardson	Rose Hill Gymnasium (1,860); Bronx, NY
February 3, 2024; 2:30 p.m., USA		at Saint Louis	W 67–65	10–12 (4–5)	26 – Rose	4 – Tied	4 – Rose	Chaifetz Arena (6,947); St. Louis, MO
February 6, 2024; 7:00 p.m., ESPN+		VCU	L 60–75	10–13 (4–6)	17 – Medor	6 – Tied	5 – Rose	Rose Hill Gymnasium (1,627); Bronx, NY
February 14, 2024; 7:00 p.m., ESPN+		St. Bonaventure	L 67–85	10–14 (4–7)	10 – Tied	4 – Tied	4 – Richardson	Rose Hill Gymnasium (1,520); Bronx, NY
February 17, 2024; 1:30 p.m., CBSSN		at No. 16 Dayton	L 70–78	10–15 (4–8)	17 – Tied	6 – Tied	3 – Tied	UD Arena (13,407); Dayton, OH
February 20, 2024; 7:00 p.m., ESPN+		at Davidson	L 53–68	10–16 (4–9)	9 – Tied	7 – Dean	3 – Charlton	John M. Belk Arena (3,009); Davidson, NC
February 23, 2024; 8:30 p.m., ESPN2		Duquesne	W 79–67	11–16 (5–9)	23 – Rose	8 – Dean	8 – Charlton	Rose Hill Gymnasium (2,850); Bronx, NY
February 27, 2024; 7:00 p.m., ESPN+		George Mason	W 61–60	12–16 (6–9)	16 – Rose	9 – Tsimbila	4 – Tied	Rose Hill Gymnasium (1,246); Bronx, NY
March 2, 2024; 12:30 p.m., USA		at Saint Joseph's	L 69–82	12–17 (6–10)	31 – Rose	12 – Dean	2 – Tied	Hagan Arena (2,676); Philadelphia, PA
March 6, 2024; 7:00 p.m., ESPN+		at UMass	L 64–66	12–18 (6–11)	15 – Rose	10 – Tsimbila	5 – Rose	Mullins Center (3,245); Amherst, MA
March 9, 2024; 1:00 p.m., SNY/ESPN+		Rhode Island	L 50–58	12–19 (6–12)	11 – Richardson	7 – Tsimbila	3 – Tied	Rose Hill Gymnasium (2,850); Bronx, NY
Atlantic 10 tournament
March 12, 2024; 11:30 a.m., ESPN+	(12)	vs. (13) Davidson; First round	W 71–63 ^{OT}	13–19	19 – Richardson	10 – Tsimbila	4 – Tied	Barclays Center (5,946); Brooklyn, NY
March 13, 2024; 2:00 p.m., USA	(12)	vs. (5) VCU; Second round	L 62–69	13–20	19 – Rose	6 – Dean	1 – Tied	Barclays Center (7,725); Brooklyn, NY
*Non-conference game. ^{#}Rankings from AP Poll. (#) Tournament seedings in parentheses. All times are in Eastern Time.
