= 2024 Atlantic 10 men's basketball tournament =

American college basketball postseason tournament

- Classification: Division I
- Season: 2023–24
- Teams: 15
- Site: Barclays Center; Brooklyn, New York
- Champions: Duquesne (2nd title)
- Winning coach: Keith Dambrot (1st title)
- Attendance: 49,089 (total); 7,805 (championship)
- Television: ESPN+, USA Network/Peacock, CBSSN, CBS/Paramount+

2023–24 Atlantic 10 men's basketball standings
	Conf.				Overall
Team	W		L	PCT	W		L	PCT
Richmond	15	–	3	.833	23	–	10	.697
Loyola Chicago	15	–	3	.833	23	–	10	.697
No. 24 Dayton	14	–	4	.778	25	–	8	.758
UMass	11	–	7	.611	20	–	11	.645
VCU	11	–	7	.611	24	–	14	.632
Duquesne †	10	–	8	.556	25	–	12	.676
St. Bonaventure	9	–	9	.500	20	–	13	.606
George Mason	9	–	9	.500	20	–	12	.625
Saint Joseph's	9	–	9	.500	21	–	14	.600
La Salle	6	–	12	.333	16	–	17	.485
Rhode Island	6	–	12	.333	12	–	20	.375
Fordham	6	–	12	.333	13	–	20	.394
Davidson	5	–	13	.278	15	–	17	.469
Saint Louis	5	–	13	.278	13	–	20	.394
George Washington	4	–	14	.222	15	–	17	.469
† 2024 A-10 tournament winner Rankings from AP poll

The 2024 Atlantic 10 men's basketball tournament was the postseason men's basketball tournament for the 2023–24 season of the Atlantic 10 Conference (A-10). It was held from March 12–17, 2024, in Brooklyn, New York, at Barclays Center. It was the 48th annual edition of the tournament. Notably, all four top seeds lost on the same day in the Quarterfinals.

== Seeds ==
All 15 A-10 schools will participate in the tournament. Teams will be seeded by winning percentage within the conference, with a tiebreaker system to seed teams with identical percentages. The top 9 teams will receive a first-round bye and the top four teams will receive a double-bye, automatically advancing them to the quarterfinals.

Seed	School	Conference Record	Tiebreaker #1	Tiebreaker #2
1	Richmond	15–3	1–0 vs. Loyola Chicago	
2	Loyola Chicago	15–3	0–1 vs. Richmond	
3	Dayton	14–4		
4	UMass	11–7	1–0 vs. VCU	
5	VCU	11–7	0–1 vs. UMass	
6	Duquesne	10–8		
7	St. Bonaventure	9–9	1–1 vs. George Mason/Saint Joseph's	1–1 vs. Richmond/Loyola
8	George Mason	9–9	1–1 vs. St. Bonaventure/Saint Joseph's	1–3 vs. Richmond/Loyola
9	Saint Joseph's	9–9	1–1 vs. St. Bonaventure/George Mason	0–3 vs. Richmond/Loyola
10	La Salle	6–12	2–1 vs. Rhode Island/Fordham	
11	Rhode Island	6–12	2–2 vs. La Salle/Fordham	
12	Fordham	6–12	1–2 vs. La Salle/Rhode Island	
13	Davidson	5–13	1–0 vs. Saint Louis	
14	Saint Louis	5–13	0–1 vs. Davidson	
15	George Washington	4–14		

== Schedule ==
Session	Game	Time	Matchup	Score	Television	Attendance
First round – Tuesday, March 12
1	1	11:30 am	No. 12 Fordham vs No. 13 Davidson	71–63 ^{OT}	ESPN+	5,946
1	2	2:30 pm	No. 10 La Salle vs No. 15 George Washington	61–60	ESPN+	5,946
1	3	5:00 pm	No. 11 Rhode Island vs. No. 14 Saint Louis	71–74	ESPN+	5,946
Second round – Wednesday, March 13
2	4	11:30 am	No. 8 George Mason vs No. 9 Saint Joseph's	57–64	USA Network	7,725
2	5	2:00 pm	No. 5 VCU vs No. 12 Fordham	69–62	USA Network	7,725
3	6	5:00 pm	No. 7 St. Bonaventure vs No. 10 La Salle	75−73	USA Network	6,432
3	7	7:30 pm	No. 6 Duquesne vs No. 14 Saint Louis	83–73	USA Network	6,432
Quarterfinals – Thursday, March 14
4	8	11:30 am	No. 1 Richmond vs No. 9 Saint Joseph's	61–66	USA Network	6,817
4	9	2:00 pm	No. 4 UMass vs No. 5 VCU	59–73	USA Network	6,817
5	10	5:00 pm	No. 2 Loyola Chicago vs No. 7 St. Bonaventure	74–75^{2OT}	USA Network	6,327
5	11	7:30 pm	No. 3 Dayton vs No. 6 Duquesne	57–65	USA Network	6,327
Semifinals – Saturday, March 16
6	12	1:00 pm	No. 9 Saint Joseph's vs No. 5 VCU	60–66	CBSSN	8,037
6	13	3:30 pm	No. 7 St. Bonaventure vs No. 6 Duquesne	60–70	CBSSN	8,037
Championship – Sunday, March 17
7	14	1:00 pm	No. 5 VCU vs No. 6 Duquesne	51–57	CBS	7,805

*Game times in Eastern Time.

== Bracket ==
First round Tuesday, March 12; ESPN+
12	Fordham	71*
13	Davidson	63
10	La Salle	61
15	George Washington	60
11	Rhode Island	71
14	Saint Louis	74

Second round Wednesday, March 13; USA Network
8	George Mason	57
9	Saint Joseph's	64
5	VCU	69
12	Fordham	62
7	St. Bonaventure	75
10	La Salle	73
6	Duquesne	83
14	Saint Louis	73

Quarterfinals; Thursday, March 14; USA Network
1	Richmond	61
9	Saint Joseph's	66
4	UMass	59
5	VCU	73
2	Loyola Chicago	74
7	St. Bonaventure	75**
3	Dayton	57
6	Duquesne	65

Semifinals; Saturday, March 16; CBSSN
9	Saint Joseph's	60
5	VCU	66
7	St. Bonaventure	60
6	Duquesne	70

Championship; Sunday, March 17; CBS
5	VCU	51
6	Duquesne	57

* denotes overtime period
