= 2023–24 La Salle Explorers men's basketball team =

American college basketball season

2023–24 La Salle Explorers men's basketball
- Conference: Atlantic 10 Conference
- Record: 16–17 (6–12 A–10)
- Head coach: Fran Dunphy (2nd season)
- Assistant coaches: John Cox; Donnie Carr; Mark Hueber
- Home arena: Tom Gola Arena

2023–24 Atlantic 10 men's basketball standings
	Conf.				Overall
Team	W		L	PCT	W		L	PCT
Richmond	15	–	3	.833	23	–	10	.697
Loyola Chicago	15	–	3	.833	23	–	10	.697
No. 24 Dayton	14	–	4	.778	25	–	8	.758
UMass	11	–	7	.611	20	–	11	.645
VCU	11	–	7	.611	24	–	14	.632
Duquesne †	10	–	8	.556	25	–	12	.676
St. Bonaventure	9	–	9	.500	20	–	13	.606
George Mason	9	–	9	.500	20	–	12	.625
Saint Joseph's	9	–	9	.500	21	–	14	.600
La Salle	6	–	12	.333	16	–	17	.485
Rhode Island	6	–	12	.333	12	–	20	.375
Fordham	6	–	12	.333	13	–	20	.394
Davidson	5	–	13	.278	15	–	17	.469
Saint Louis	5	–	13	.278	13	–	20	.394
George Washington	4	–	14	.222	15	–	17	.469
† 2024 A-10 tournament winner Rankings from AP poll

The 2023–24 La Salle Explorers men's basketball team represented La Salle University in the 2023–24 NCAA Division I men's basketball season. The Explorers, led by second-year head coach Fran Dunphy, played their home games at Tom Gola Arena in Philadelphia, Pennsylvania as members of the Atlantic 10 Conference. This season was the final season the Explorers played at Tom Gola Arena.

== Previous season ==
The Explorers finished the 2022–23 season 15–19, 7–11 in A-10 play to finish in a tie for 11th place. As the No. 11 seed in the A-10 tournament, they defeated Rhode Island in the first round, Duquesne in the second round before losing to Fordham in the quarterfinals.

== Offseason ==
=== Departures ===
Name	Number	Pos.	Height	Weight	Year	Hometown	Reason for departure
Hassan Drame	4	F	6'7"	200	Senior	Bamako, Mali	Graduate transferred to Duquesne
Josh Nickelberry	10	G	6'4"	205	Senior	Fayetteville, NC	Graduate transferred to Florida State
Fousseyni Drame	11	F	6'7"	200	Senior	Bamako, Mali	Graduate transferred to Duquesne
Mamadou Doucoure	14	F	6'9"	250	GS Senior	Bamako, Mali	Graduated

=== Incoming transfers ===
Name	Num	Pos.	Height	Weight	Year	Hometown	Previous School
Milos Kovacevic	31	F	6'9"		Junior	Belgrade, Serbia	Highland CC

=== 2023 recruiting class ===
College recruiting
Name	Hometown	School	Height	Weight	Commit date
Tunde Vahlberg Fasasi; SF	Stockholm, Sweden	Hoosac School	6 ft 8 in (2.03 m)	N/A	May 6, 2023
Tunde Vahlberg Fasasi; SF	Recruit ratings: No ratings found				
Efe Tahmaz; SF	Kadıköy, Turkey	Beşiktaş Basketbol	6 ft 9 in (2.06 m)	N/A	Aug 22, 2023
Efe Tahmaz; SF	Recruit ratings: No ratings found				
Overall recruit ranking:
Note: In many cases, Scout, Rivals, 247Sports, On3, and ESPN may conflict in their listings of height and weight.; In these cases, the average was taken. ESPN grades are on a 100-point scale.; Sources: "2023 Team Ranking". Rivals.

== Roster ==
2023–24 La Salle Explorers men's basketball team
Players
Coaches

Pos.	#	Name	Height	Weight	Year	Previous school	Hometown
G	0	Andrés Marrero	6 ft 5 in (1.96 m)	200 lb (91 kg)	RS So	Upper Room Christian School (NY)	Caracas, Venezuela
G	1	Charles Ireland (W)	6 ft 2 in (1.88 m)	165 lb (75 kg)	Jr	La Salle College	Glenside, PA
G	2	Jhamir Brickus	5 ft 11 in (1.8 m)	205 lb (93 kg)	Sr	Coatesville	Coatesville, PA
G	3	Anwar Gill	6 ft 4 in (1.93 m)	205 lb (93 kg)	Sr	Montverde Academy	Washington, D.C.
G	5	Khalil Brantley	6 ft 1 in (1.85 m)	175 lb (79 kg)	Jr	Our Savior Lutheran	Bronx, NY
G	10	Jorge Sanchez-Ramos	6 ft 2 in (1.88 m)	160 lb (73 kg)	So	Colegio Peñalar	Torrelodones, Spain
G/F	11	James Joseph (W)	6 ft 7 in (2.01 m)	200 lb (91 kg)	Sr	Springfield Township; Montgomery County CC	Torrelodones, Spain
G	12	Tommy Gardler (W)	6 ft 1 in (1.85 m)	185 lb (84 kg)	Jr	The Phelps School; USciences	Broomall, PA
G	13	Daeshon Shepherd	6 ft 5 in (1.96 m)	200 lb (91 kg)	Jr	Archbishop Wood	Philadelphia, PA
F	14	Efe Tahmaz	6 ft 8 in (2.03 m)	210 lb (95 kg)	Fr	Smartanac	Istanbul, Turkey
F	21	Ryan Zan	6 ft 7 in (2.01 m)	200 lb (91 kg)	So	Rutgers Prep	Princeton, NJ
G/F	25	Lucas Mercandino	6 ft 6 in (1.98 m)	170 lb (77 kg)	So	IPEM 21 Alfonsina Storni	Córdoba, Argentina
F	31	Milos Kovacevic	6 ft 9 in (2.06 m)	235 lb (107 kg)	Jr	Sagemont (FL); Highland CC	Princeton, NJ
G/F	34	Tunde Vahlberg Fasasi	6 ft 8 in (2.03 m)	210 lb (95 kg)	Fr	Hoosac School (NY)	Stockholm, Sweden
F	35	Rokas Jocius	6 ft 10 in (2.08 m)	260 lb (118 kg)	So	Vilniaus Perlas Energija	Kaunas, Lithuania

Head coach

- Fran Dunphy (La Salle)

Assistant coach(es)

- Kyle Griffin (Siena)
- Donnie Carr (La Salle)
- Mark Hueber (Immaculata)

Legend

- (C) Team captain
- (S) Suspended
- (I) Ineligible
- (W) Walk-on
- Injured
- Current redshirt

Roster

== Schedule and results ==
Date time, TV	Rank^{#}	Opponent^{#}	Result	Record	High points	High rebounds	High assists	Site (attendance) city, state
Non-conference regular season
November 7, 2023*; 6:30 p.m., ESPN+		Drexel; Big 5 Classic Pod 1	W 67–61	1–0	18 – Brickus	9 – Jocius	4 – Gill	Tom Gola Arena (1,641); Philadelphia, PA
November 11, 2023*; 3:30 p.m., ESPN+		Northeastern	W 79–74	2–0	22 – Brickus	5 – Gill	7 – Gill	Tom Gola Arena (2,871); Philadelphia, PA
November 14, 2023*; 6:30 p.m., ESPN+		Bucknell; Blue Devil Challenge	W 69–57	3–0	22 – Shepherd	9 – Shepherd	6 – Brantley	Tom Gola Arena (1,612); Philadelphia, PA
November 18, 2023*; 2:00 p.m., ESPN+		Southern Indiana; Blue Devil Challenge	W 79–78	4–0	30 – Brantley	8 – Shepherd	6 – Gill	Tom Gola Arena (1,254); Philadelphia, PA
November 21, 2023*; 7:00 p.m., ACCN		at No. 9 Duke; Blue Devil Challenge	L 66–95	4–1	17 – Gill	9 – Jocius	4 – Brickus	Cameron Indoor Stadium (9,314); Durham, NC
November 26, 2023*; 1:00 p.m., ESPN+		Coppin State	W 81–62	5–1	21 – Gill	10 – Jocius	6 – Brantley	Tom Gola Arena (1,473); Philadelphia, PA
November 29, 2023*; 7:00 p.m., ESPN+		at Temple; Big 5 Classic Pod 1	L 99–106 ^{3OT}	5–2	41 – Brickus	14 – Brantley	5 – Brantley	Liacouras Center (4,229); Philadelphia, PA
December 2, 2023*; 4:45 p.m., NBCSP+/Peacock		vs. Penn; Big 5 Classic third place game	W 93–92 ^{OT}	6–2	24 – Brantley	8 – Shepherd	7 – Gill	Wells Fargo Center; Philadelphia, PA
December 6, 2023*; 6:30 p.m., ESPN+		Loyola (MD)	W 62–61	7–2	18 – Marrero	9 – Shepherd	8 – Brickus	Tom Gola Arena (1,269); Philadelphia, PA
December 9, 2023*; 2:00 p.m., ESPN+		at Lafayette	W 67–51	8–2	20 – Marrero	9 – Brantley	8 – Brickus	Kirby Sports Center (1,009); Easton, PA
December 16, 2023*; 12:00 p.m., The CW		at No. 24 Miami (FL)	L 77–84	8–3	23 – Brantley	8 – Shepherd	8 – Brickus	Watsco Center (6,407); Coral Gables, FL
December 21, 2023*; 2:30 p.m., ESPN+		Rosemont	W 107–41	9–3	19 – Zan	7 – Zan	12 – Brantley	Tom Gola Arena (1,045); Philadelphia, PA
December 30, 2023*; 2:00 p.m., ESPN+		Howard	L 66–71	9–4	17 – Brantley	13 – Shepherd	3 – Brantley	Tom Gola Arena (1,732); Philadelphia, PA
Atlantic 10 regular season
January 3, 2024; 6:30 p.m., ESPN+		George Mason	L 62–77	9–5 (0–1)	19 – Brickus	5 – Tied	4 – Tied	Tom Gola Arena (1,243); Philadelphia, PA
January 6, 2024; 12:00 p.m., USA		at Fordham	W 81–76	10–5 (1–1)	15 – Shepherd	8 – Shepherd	5 – Tied	Rose Hill Gymnasium (1,246); Bronx, NY
January 10, 2024; 7:00 p.m., NBC Sports App		at UMass	L 65–81	10–6 (1–2)	14 – Vahlberg Fasasi	8 – Shepherd	6 – Brickus	Mullins Center (2,227); Amherst, MA
January 13, 2024; 12:30 p.m., USA		VCU	L 65–71	10–7 (1–3)	20 – Brickus	9 – Zan	3 – Marrero	Tom Gola Arena (1,647); Philadelphia, PA
January 15, 2024; 4:00 p.m., CBSSN		at Saint Joseph's	L 62–82	10–8 (1–4)	16 – Brantley	5 – Marrero	5 – Brantley	Hagan Arena (2,796); Philadelphia, PA
January 23, 2024; 6:30 p.m., ESPN+		No. 16 Dayton	L 54–66	10–9 (1–5)	13 – Marrero	7 – Tied	6 – Brantley	Tom Gola Arena (1,571); Philadelphia, PA
January 27, 2024; 6:00 p.m., ESPN+		at George Washington	W 80–70	11–9 (2–5)	20 – Brantley	8 – Brantley	8 – Brickus	Charles E. Smith Center (2,054); Washington, D.C.
January 31, 2024; 7:00 p.m., ESPN+		at Rhode Island	L 69–71	11–10 (2–6)	19 – Brantley	13 – Jocius	6 – Brickus	Ryan Center (4,033); Kingston, RI
February 3, 2024; 12:00 p.m., ESPNU		Saint Joseph's	L 82–88	11–11 (2–7)	24 – Brickus	8 – Brickus	8 – Brickus	Tom Gola Arena (3,174); Philadelphia, PA
February 7, 2024; 6:30 p.m., ESPN+		Saint Louis	L 84–102	11–12 (2–8)	24 – Gill	10 – Brantley	6 – Brickus	Tom Gola Arena (1,202); Philadelphia, PA
February 10, 2024; 2:00 p.m., ESPN+		at Richmond	L 65–82	11–13 (2–9)	22 – Brantley	10 – Jocius	4 – Brickus	Robins Center (7,201); Richmond, VA
February 13, 2024; 7:00 p.m., ESPN+		at Davidson	L 56–71	11–14 (2–10)	16 – Brantley	7 – Shepherd	3 – Brantley	John M. Belk Arena (2,268); Davidson, NC
February 17, 2024; 2:00 p.m., ESPN+		UMass	W 82–81	12–14 (3–10)	19 – Tied	10 – Brantley	6 – Tied	Tom Gola Arena (1,636); Philadelphia, PA
February 21, 2024; 6:30 p.m., ESPN+		St. Bonaventure	W 72–59	13–14 (4–10)	23 – Shepherd	7 – Tied	7 – Brantley	Tom Gola Arena (1,439); Philadelphia, PA
February 25, 2024; 12:00 p.m., USA		Rhode Island	W 84–61	14–14 (5–10)	22 – Brantley	8 – Shepherd	6 – Gill	Tom Gola Arena (1,642); Philadelphia, PA
February 28, 2024; 7:00 p.m., ESPN+		at Duquesne	L 63–75	14–15 (5–11)	17 – Shepherd	7 – Tied	7 – Brantley	UPMC Cooper Fieldhouse (2,233); Pittsburgh, PA
March 2, 2024; 2:00 p.m., ESPN+		George Washington	W 72–66	15–15 (6–11)	15 – Tied	7 – Brantley	6 – Brantley	Tom Gola Arena (2,278); Philadelphia, PA
March 9, 2024; 4:00 p.m., ESPN+		at Loyola Chicago	L 54–64	15–16 (6–12)	11 – Brickus	6 – Tied	4 – Brickus	Joseph J. Gentile Arena (4,557); Chicago, IL
Atlantic 10 tournament
March 12, 2024; 2:00 p.m., ESPN+	(10)	vs. (15) George Washington; First round	W 61–60	16–16	21 – Brickus	9 – Brantley	3 – Brickus	Barclays Center; Brooklyn, NY
March 13, 2024; 5:00 p.m., USA	(10)	vs. (7) St. Bonaventure; Second round	L 73–75	16–17	15 – Jocius	7 – Jocius	5 – Brickus	Barclays Center; Brooklyn, NY
*Non-conference game. ^{#}Rankings from AP Poll. (#) Tournament seedings in parentheses. All times are in Eastern Time.
