= 2023–24 UMass Minutemen basketball team =

American college basketball season

2023–24 UMass Minutemen basketball
- Conference: Atlantic 10 Conference
- Record: 20–11 (11–7 A–10)
- Head coach: Frank Martin (2nd season)
- Associate head coach: Allen Edwards
- Assistant coaches: Brian Steele; Brett Nelson
- Home arena: Mullins Center

2023–24 Atlantic 10 men's basketball standings
	Conf.				Overall
Team	W		L	PCT	W		L	PCT
Richmond	15	–	3	.833	23	–	10	.697
Loyola Chicago	15	–	3	.833	23	–	10	.697
No. 24 Dayton	14	–	4	.778	25	–	8	.758
UMass	11	–	7	.611	20	–	11	.645
VCU	11	–	7	.611	24	–	14	.632
Duquesne †	10	–	8	.556	25	–	12	.676
St. Bonaventure	9	–	9	.500	20	–	13	.606
George Mason	9	–	9	.500	20	–	12	.625
Saint Joseph's	9	–	9	.500	21	–	14	.600
La Salle	6	–	12	.333	16	–	17	.485
Rhode Island	6	–	12	.333	12	–	20	.375
Fordham	6	–	12	.333	13	–	20	.394
Davidson	5	–	13	.278	15	–	17	.469
Saint Louis	5	–	13	.278	13	–	20	.394
George Washington	4	–	14	.222	15	–	17	.469
† 2024 A-10 tournament winner Rankings from AP poll

The 2023–24 UMass Minutemen basketball team represented the University of Massachusetts Amherst during the 2023–24 NCAA Division I men's basketball season. The Minutemen were led by second-year head coach Frank Martin and played their home games at the William D. Mullins Memorial Center in Amherst, Massachusetts as members of the Atlantic 10 Conference.

Although the Minutemen were picked to finish 13th (of 15) in the Atlantic 10, the 2023-24 squad outperformed expectations, finishing 11-7 in the conference and a fourth-place finish. Josh Cohen and Matt Cross each earned Atlantic 10 First Team honors at the end of the season, and the team finished with a 20-11 overall record, their most wins in ten seasons.

== Previous season ==
The Minutemen finished the 2022–23 season 15–16, 6–12 in A-10 play to finish in 13th place. They lost in the first round of the A-10 tournament to Richmond. The team then saw seven players transfer out, and lost a total of 72% of their scoring output.

== Offseason ==
=== Departures ===
Name	Number	Pos.	Height	Weight	Year	Hometown	Reason for departure
Wildens Leveque	0	F/C	6'10"	255	Senior	Brockton, MA	Graduate transferred to Texas A&M
Brandon Martin	1	F	6'5"	223	GS Senior	Miami, FL	Graduated
Tafara Gapare	2	F	6'9"	185	Freshman	Wellington, New Zealand	Transferred to Georgia Tech
Ta'Quan Woodley	5	F	6'8"	280	Sophomore	Camden, NJ	Left the team for personal reasons
Isaac Kante	10	F	6'7"	259	GS Senior	Brooklyn, NY	Graduated
Noah Fernandes	11	G	5'11"	180	Senior	Mattapoisett, MA	Graduate transferred to Rutgers
RJ Luis Jr.	12	G	6'7"	196	Freshman	Miami, FL	Transferred to St. John's
Gianni Thompson	13	F	6'8"	210	Sophomore	Newton, MA	Left team, no detail announced
T.J. Weeks Jr.	23	G	6'4"	190	RS Junior	Warwick, RI	Transferred to Rider
John Kelly	44	F	6'7"	212	RS Junior	Shelton, CT	Walk-on; transferred to Assumption
Dyondre Dominguez	45	F	6'9"	200	Junior	Providence, RI	Transferred to Arkansas State

=== Incoming transfers ===
Name	Number	Pos.	Height	Weight	Year	Hometown	Previous School
Daniel Hankins-Sanford	1	F	6'8"	233	Sophomore	Charlotte, NC	South Carolina
Josh Cohen	23	F	6'10"	220	RS Senior	Lincroft, NJ	Saint Francis (PA)

=== 2023 recruiting class ===
College recruiting information
Name	Hometown	School	Height	Weight	Commit date
Sawyer Mayhugh #51 C	Weston, MA	Brewster Academy	6 ft 10 in (2.08 m)	220 lb (100 kg)	Oct 1, 2022
Sawyer Mayhugh #51 C	Recruit ratings: Scout: Rivals: 247Sports: ESPN: (79)				
Jaylen Curry #42 PG	Charlotte, NC	Calvary Christian Academy	6 ft 0 in (1.83 m)	160 lb (73 kg)	Apr 28, 2023
Jaylen Curry #42 PG	Recruit ratings: Scout: Rivals: 247Sports: ESPN: (81)				
Jayden Ndjigue; SF	Weston, MA	The Rivers School	6 ft 4 in (1.93 m)	190 lb (86 kg)	Aug 9, 2022
Jayden Ndjigue; SF	Recruit ratings: Scout: Rivals: 247Sports: ESPN: (NR)				
Robert Davis; SF	Castaic, CA	Southern California Academy	6 ft 6 in (1.98 m)	190 lb (86 kg)	Aug 26, 2022
Robert Davis; SF	Recruit ratings: Scout: Rivals: 247Sports: ESPN: (NR)				
Rollie Castineyra; PG	Exeter, NH	Phillips Exeter Academy	6 ft 1 in (1.85 m)	180 lb (82 kg)	Sep 23, 2022
Rollie Castineyra; PG	Recruit ratings: Scout: Rivals: 247Sports: ESPN: (NR)				
Marqui Worthy; SG	Garden Grove, CA	Veritas Prep	6 ft 3 in (1.91 m)	180 lb (82 kg)	Oct 17, 2022
Marqui Worthy; SG	Recruit ratings: Scout: Rivals: 247Sports: ESPN: (NR)				
Tarique Foster; SF	Bronx, NY	Putnam Science Academy	6 ft 8 in (2.03 m)	180 lb (82 kg)	Jun 26, 2023
Tarique Foster; SF	Recruit ratings: Scout: Rivals: 247Sports: ESPN: (NR)				
Overall recruit ranking:
Note: In many cases, Scout, Rivals, 247Sports, On3, and ESPN may conflict in their listings of height and weight.; In these cases, the average was taken. ESPN grades are on a 100-point scale.; Sources: "2023 Team Ranking". Rivals.

Sawyer Mayhugh participated with the team in the summer 2023 program, but left the university in October.

=== 2024 recruiting class ===
College recruiting information (2024)
Name	Hometown	School	Height	Weight	Commit date
Nate Guerengomba; SF	Washington, DC	South Kent School	6 ft 4 in (1.93 m)	200 lb (91 kg)	Aug 6, 2023
Nate Guerengomba; SF	Recruit ratings: Scout: Rivals: 247Sports: ESPN: (0)				
Overall recruit ranking:
Note: In many cases, Scout, Rivals, 247Sports, On3, and ESPN may conflict in their listings of height and weight.; In these cases, the average was taken. ESPN grades are on a 100-point scale.; Sources: "2024 Team Ranking". Rivals.

== Roster ==
2023–24 UMass Minutemen men's basketball team
Players
Coaches

Pos.	#	Name	Height	Weight	Year	Previous school	Hometown
F	1	Daniel Hankins-Sanford	6 ft 8 in (2.03 m)	233 lb (106 kg)	So	Julius L. Chambers HS; South Carolina	Charlotte, NC
G	2	Jaylen Curry	6 ft 0 in (1.83 m)	160 lb (73 kg)	Fr	Calvary Christian Academy (FL)	Charlotte, NC
G	3	Rahsool Diggins	6 ft 2 in (1.88 m)	185 lb (84 kg)	Jr	Archbishop Wood HS; UConn	Philadelphia, PA
G	4	Robert Davis Jr.	6 ft 6 in (1.98 m)	175 lb (79 kg)	Fr	Southern California Academy	Detroit, MI
G	5	Keon Thompson	6 ft 0 in (1.83 m)	210 lb (95 kg)	So	Hargrave Military Academy	Merrillville, IN
G	10	Marqui Worthy	6 ft 3 in (1.91 m)	185 lb (84 kg)	Fr	Veritas Academy (CA)	Anaheim, CA
G	11	Jayden Ndjigue	6 ft 4 in (1.93 m)	190 lb (86 kg)	Fr	The Rivers School	Ayer, MA
F	12	Tarique Foster	6 ft 8 in (2.03 m)	175 lb (79 kg)	Fr	Cardinal Hayes HS	Bronx, NY
G	20	Ryan Marcus (W)	6 ft 3 in (1.91 m)	185 lb (84 kg)	Sr	Wakefield Memorial HS	Wakefield, MA
G	22	Jackson Cronin (W)	6 ft 0 in (1.83 m)	187 lb (85 kg)	Jr	Great Neck North HS; Nebraska	Great Neck, NY
F	23	Josh Cohen	6 ft 10 in (2.08 m)	220 lb (100 kg)	RS Sr	Christian Brothers Academy; Saint Francis (PA)	Lincroft, NJ
F	24	Tyler Mason	6 ft 10 in (2.08 m)	225 lb (102 kg)	Fr	Phhoenix Prep	Stafford, VA
F	33	Matt Cross	6 ft 7 in (2.01 m)	230 lb (104 kg)	Sr	Brewster Academy; Louisville	Beverly, MA
C	34	Mathok Majok	7 ft 3 in (2.21 m)	210 lb (95 kg)	Fr	Bridgeport Prep (CT)	Kuajok, South Sudan
G	44	Rollie Castineyra (W)	6 ft 1 in (1.85 m)	180 lb (82 kg)	Fr	Phillips Exeter Academy (NH)	Marblehead, MA

Head coach

- Frank Martin (FIU)

Assistant coach(es)

- Allen Edwards (Kentucky)
- Brian Steele (South Carolina)
- Brett Nelson (Florida)

Legend

- (C) Team captain
- (S) Suspended
- (I) Ineligible
- (W) Walk-on
- Injured
- Current redshirt

Roster

Tyler Mason joined the team in December, after reclassifying.

== Schedule and results ==
Date time, TV	Rank^{#}	Opponent^{#}	Result	Record	High points	High rebounds	High assists	Site (attendance) city, state
Exhibition
October 25, 2023*; 7:00 p.m.		Western Connecticut State	W 85–41		20 – Davis Jr.	14 – Majok	6 – Ndjigue	Mullins Center; Amherst, MA
Non-conference regular season
November 7, 2023*; 7:00 p.m., NESN/ESPN+		Albany	W 92–71	1–0	22 – Cohen	8 – Cohen	6 – Thompson	Mullins Center (3,015); Amherst, MA
November 13, 2023*; 7:00 p.m., NESN/ESPN+		Quinnipiac	W 102–81	2–0	22 – Diggins	7 – Cohen	5 – Cohen	Mullins Center (2,382); Amherst, MA
November 17, 2023*; 7:00 p.m., NESN+/ESPN+		Harvard	L 75–78 ^{OT}	2–1	16 – Cross	16 – Cross	4 – Curry	Mullins Center (3,735); Amherst, MA
November 22, 2023*; 7:00 p.m., NESN/ESPN+		Central Connecticut	W 89–60	3–1	31 – Cross	9 – Cross	6 – Diggins	Mullins Center (2,054); Amherst, MA
December 2, 2023*; 1:00 p.m., NESN/ESPN+		South Florida	W 66–56	4–1	21 – Cohen	11 – Cross	3 – Diggins	Mullins Center (3,254); Amherst, MA
December 6, 2023*; 7:00 p.m., FloSports		at Towson	L 71–81	4–2	19 – Thompson	8 – Tied	4 – Ndjigue	SECU Arena (1,802); Towson, MD
December 9, 2023*; 12:00 p.m., NESN+/ESPN+		UMass Lowell	W 91–77	5–2	25 – Cohen	14 – Cohen	6 – Thompson	Mullins Center (3,028); Amherst, MA
December 16, 2023*; 6:30 p.m., ESPNU		vs. West Virginia; Basketball Hall of Fame Classic	W 87–79	6–2	19 – Cohen	13 – Cross	5 – Cross	MassMutual Center (4,264); Springfield, MA
December 21, 2023*; 9:00 p.m., ESPN2		vs. Georgia Tech; Diamond Head Classic quarterfinals	L 70–73	6–3	17 – Cross	9 – Cross	4 – Thompson	Stan Sheriff Center; Honolulu, HI
December 23, 2023*; 1:00 a.m., ESPN2		vs. Portland; Diamond Head Classic Consolation Round	W 100–78	7–3	28 – Cohen	8 – Cross	6 – Thompson	Stan Sheriff Center (4,919); Honolulu, HI
December 24, 2023*; 3:30 p.m., ESPN2		vs. Old Dominion; Diamond Head Classic 5th Place Game	W 87–65	8–3	28 – Cohen	7 – Cross	5 – Cross	Stan Sheriff Center (4,342); Honolulu, HI
December 30, 2023*; 1:00 p.m., NESN/ESPN+		Siena	W 79–66	9–3	24 – Cross	9 – Cross	5 – Cross	Mullins Center (4,036); Amherst, MA
A-10 regular season
January 3, 2024; 7:00 p.m., ESPN+		Duquesne	W 80–61	10–3 (1–0)	16 – Diggins	8 – Cross	6 – Thompson	Mullins Center (2,561); Amherst, MA
January 7, 2024; 1:00 p.m., ESPN2		at Dayton	L 60–64	10–4 (1–1)	18 – Cross	14 – Cross	3 – Tied	UD Arena (13,407); Dayton, OH
January 10, 2024; 7:00 p.m., NBC Sports App		La Salle	W 81–65	11–4 (2–1)	24 – Cohen	13 – Hankins-Sanford	4 – Tied	Mullins Center (2,227); Amherst, MA
January 13, 2024; 2:00 p.m., ESPN+		at Rhode Island	L 77–89	11–5 (2–2)	23 – Cohen	11 – Cohen	4 – Curry	Ryan Center (5,496); Kingston, RI
January 17, 2024; 7:00 p.m., CBSSN		at Loyola Chicago	L 78–79	11–6 (2–3)	28 – Cohen	8 – Cohen	3 – Thompson	Joseph J. Gentile Arena (2,748); Chicago, IL
January 20, 2024; 12:00 p.m., NESN/ESPN+		George Washington	W 81–67	12–6 (3–3)	25 – Diggins	12 – Cohen	5 – Diggins	Mullins Center (3,586); Amherst, MA
January 23, 2024; 7:00 p.m., NESN/ESPN+		Saint Joseph's	L 77–78	12–7 (3–4)	17 – Diggins	11 – Ndjigue	4 – Tied	Mullins Center (3,210); Amherst, MA
January 27, 2024; 8:00 p.m., ESPN+		at Saint Louis	W 84–73	13–7 (4–4)	19 – Cross	10 – Hankins-Sanford	5 – Cross	Chaifetz Arena (7,423); St. Louis, MO
February 3, 2024; 12:00 p.m., NESN/ESPN+		George Mason	W 66–65	14–7 (5–4)	17 – Cohen	9 – Cross	5 – Ndjigue	Mullins Center; Amherst, MA
February 7, 2024; 7:00 p.m., NBC Sports App		at St. Bonaventure	L 73–79	14–8 (5–5)	19 – Cross	7 – Thompson	5 – Cross	Reilly Center (3,748); Olean, NY
February 11, 2024; 2:00 p.m., USA		Rhode Island	W 81–79	15–8 (6–5)	18 – Diggins	7 – Cross	6 – Cross	Mullins Center (3,553); Amherst, MA
February 14, 2024; 7:00 p.m., ESPN+		at Richmond	W 69–59	16–8 (7–5)	16 – Cross	13 – Cross	2 – Tied	Robins Center (4,797); Richmond, VA
February 17, 2024; 2:00 p.m., ESPN+		at La Salle	L 81–82	16–9 (7–6)	21 – Cohen	13 – Cohen	3 – Diggins	Tom Gola Arena (1,636); Philadelphia, PA
February 20, 2024; 7:00 p.m., CBSSN		VCU	W 74–52	17–9 (8–6)	20 – Cohen	12 – Cross	4 – Cohen	Mullins Center (4,313); Amherst, MA
February 24, 2024; 2:30 p.m., USA		St. Bonaventure	L 67–75	17–10 (8–7)	18 – Cohen	7 – Tied	5 – Thompson	Mullins Center (7,016); Amherst, MA
February 27, 2024; 7:00 p.m., ESPN+		at George Washington	W 69–57	18–10 (9–7)	17 – Cross	7 – Cross	4 – Thompson	Charles E. Smith Center (1,259); Washington, D.C.
March 2, 2024; 2:30 p.m., USA		at Davidson	W 69–67	19–10 (10–7)	26 – Cross	13 – Hankins-Sanford	2 – Tied	John M. Belk Arena (3,771); Davidson, NC
March 6, 2024; 7:00 p.m., ESPN+		Fordham	W 66–64	20–10 (11–7)	19 – Cohen	9 – Tied	3 – Ndjigue	Mullins Center (3,245); Amherst, MA
A-10 tournament
March 14, 2024; 2:00 p.m., USA	(4)	vs. (5) VCU; Quarterfinals	L 59–73	20–11	21 – Diggins	8 – Cross	5 – Cross	Barclays Center; Brooklyn, NY
*Non-conference game. ^{#}Rankings from AP Poll / Coaches' Poll. (#) Tournament seedings in parentheses. All times are in Eastern.
