= 2023–24 Duquesne Dukes men's basketball team =

American college basketball season

2023–24 Duquesne Dukes men's basketball

Atlantic 10 tournament champions

NCAA tournament, Second Round
- Conference: Atlantic 10 Conference
- Record: 25–12 (10–8 A–10)
- Head coach: Keith Dambrot (7th season)
- Associate head coach: Dru Joyce III
- Assistant coaches: Rick McFadden; Terry Weigand; Steve Wright; Ari Stern
- Home arena: UPMC Cooper Fieldhouse

2023–24 Atlantic 10 men's basketball standings
	Conf.				Overall
Team	W		L	PCT	W		L	PCT
Richmond	15	–	3	.833	23	–	10	.697
Loyola Chicago	15	–	3	.833	23	–	10	.697
No. 24 Dayton	14	–	4	.778	25	–	8	.758
UMass	11	–	7	.611	20	–	11	.645
VCU	11	–	7	.611	24	–	14	.632
Duquesne †	10	–	8	.556	25	–	12	.676
St. Bonaventure	9	–	9	.500	20	–	13	.606
George Mason	9	–	9	.500	20	–	12	.625
Saint Joseph's	9	–	9	.500	21	–	14	.600
La Salle	6	–	12	.333	16	–	17	.485
Rhode Island	6	–	12	.333	12	–	20	.375
Fordham	6	–	12	.333	13	–	20	.394
Davidson	5	–	13	.278	15	–	17	.469
Saint Louis	5	–	13	.278	13	–	20	.394
George Washington	4	–	14	.222	15	–	17	.469
† 2024 A-10 tournament winner Rankings from AP poll

The 2023–24 Duquesne Dukes men's basketball team represented Duquesne University during the 2023–24 NCAA Division I men's basketball season. The team was led by seventh-year head coach Keith Dambrot in his final season as head coach, and played their home games at the UPMC Cooper Fieldhouse in Pittsburgh, Pennsylvania as a member of the Atlantic 10 Conference (A-10). They finished the season 25–12, 10–8 in A-10 play, to finish in sixth place. As the 6 seed, they defeated Saint Louis, Dayton, St. Bonaventure and VCU to be champions of the A-10 tournament. As a result, they received the conference's automatic bid to the NCAA tournament for the sixth time in school history and first since 1977. As the No. 11 seed in the East Region, they upset BYU in the first round before losing in the second round to Illinois 89–63.

== Previous season ==
The Dukes finished the 2022–23 season 20–11, 10–8 in A-10 play, to finish in a tie for sixth place. They lost to La Salle in the first round of the A-10 tournament. The Dukes were invited to the College Basketball Invitational where they were defeated by Rice in the first round.

== Offseason ==
=== Departures ===
Name	Number	Pos.	Height	Weight	Year	Hometown	Reason for departure
Tevin Brewer	0	G	5'8"	160	GS Senior	Fort Smith, AR	Graduated
Joe Reece	20	F	6'8"	200	Senior	St. Louis, MO	Left the team for personal reasons
Rodney Gunn Jr.	21	F	6'7"	230	GS Senior	Columbia, SC	Graduated
Devin Carney	23	G	6'1"	180	Freshman	Butler, PA	Transferred to Denver
Jaylen Cole-Williams	25	G	6'1"	175	RS Sophomore	Reston, VA	Walk-on; transferred
Jake Harper	30	G	6'3"	180	Junior	Dayton, OH	Walk-on; left the team for personal reasons
Austin Rotroff	34	F	6'10"	240	GS Senior	Wauseon, OH	Graduated
Kevin Easley Jr.	35	F	6'7"	230	RS Junior	Indianapolis, IN	Transferred to Coastal Carolina
Quincy McGriff	55	G	6'6"	200	Sophomore	Los Angeles, CA	Transferred to Cal State Northridge

=== Incoming transfers ===
Name	Number	Pos.	Height	Weight	Year	Hometown	Previous school
Dusan Mahorcic	0	F	6'10"	225	GS Senior	Belgrade, Serbia	NC State
Andrei Savrasov	23	F	6'7"	225	GS Senior	Saint Petersburg, Russia	Georgia Southern
Hassan Drame	33	F	6'7"	200	GS Senior	Bamako, Mali	La Salle
Fousseyni Drame	34	F	6'7"	200	GS Senior	Bamako, Mali	La Salle

=== 2023 recruiting class ===
College recruiting information
Name	Hometown	School	Height	Weight	Commit date
Kailon Nicholls; PG	Toronto, ON	Hargrave Military Academy	6 ft 0 in (1.83 m)	160 lb (73 kg)	Apr 19, 2023
Kailon Nicholls; PG	Recruit ratings: No ratings found				
Jakub Nečas; PF	Czech Republic	Basketball Club Brno	6 ft 8 in (2.03 m)	210 lb (95 kg)	Jul 12, 2023
Jakub Nečas; PF	Recruit ratings: No ratings found				
Overall recruit ranking:
Note: In many cases, Scout, Rivals, 247Sports, On3, and ESPN may conflict in their listings of height and weight.; In these cases, the average was taken. ESPN grades are on a 100-point scale.; Sources: "2023 Team Ranking". Rivals.

=== 2024 recruiting class ===
College recruiting information (2024)
Name	Hometown	School	Height	Weight	Commit date
Dominique Aekins; PG	Columbus, OH	Walnut Ridge High School	5 ft 8 in (1.73 m)	N/A	Jul 19, 2023
Dominique Aekins; PG	Recruit ratings: No ratings found				
Overall recruit ranking:
Note: In many cases, Scout, Rivals, 247Sports, On3, and ESPN may conflict in their listings of height and weight.; In these cases, the average was taken. ESPN grades are on a 100-point scale.; Sources: "2024 Team Ranking". Rivals.

== Roster ==
2023–24 Duquesne Dukes men's basketball team
Players
Coaches

Pos.	#	Name	Height	Weight	Year	Previous school	Hometown
F	0	Dusan Mahorcic	6 ft 10 in (2.08 m)	235 lb (107 kg)	GS	Notre Dame College Prep; Utah	Belgrade, Serbia
G	1	Jimmy Clark III	6 ft 3 in (1.91 m)	185 lb (84 kg)	RS Sr	Newton HS; Northwest Florida State College	Covington, GA
F	2	David Dixon	6 ft 9 in (2.06 m)	215 lb (98 kg)	So	Speights Academy (FL)	Memphis, TN
G	3	Dae Dae Grant	6 ft 2 in (1.88 m)	185 lb (84 kg)	Sr	Lorain HS; Miami (OH)	Lorain, OH
C	4	Tre Williams	6 ft 7 in (2.01 m)	250 lb (113 kg)	RS Sr	Woodstock Academy; Indiana State	Reynoldsburg, OH
F	5	Halil Barre	6 ft 9 in (2.06 m)	220 lb (100 kg)	So	Scotland Campus (PA)	Cotonou, Benin
F	7	Jakub Necas	6 ft 8 in (2.03 m)	210 lb (95 kg)	Fr	Gymnázium Blansko	Blansko, Czech Republic
F	14	Matúš Hronský	6 ft 8 in (2.03 m)	205 lb (93 kg)	So	Wasatch Academy (UT)	Poruba, Slovakia
F	22	Andy Barba	6 ft 6 in (1.98 m)	200 lb (91 kg)	Jr	International Sports Academy	Cleveland, OH
F	23	Andrei Savrasov	6 ft 7 in (2.01 m)	225 lb (102 kg)	GS	BC Zenit; Georgia Southern	Saint Petersburg, Russia
G	25	Ethan Anish (W)	6 ft 1 in (1.85 m)	170 lb (77 kg)	Fr	Taylor Allderdice	Pittsburgh, PA
G	30	Lucas Perusek (W)	6 ft 1 in (1.85 m)	175 lb (79 kg)	Fr	St. Edward	Willoughby Hills, OH
G	31	Seamus McDermott (W)	6 ft 2 in (1.88 m)	185 lb (84 kg)	Fr	Holy Ghost Prep	Holland, PA
G	32	Kareem Rozier	5 ft 9 in (1.75 m)	160 lb (73 kg)	So	St. Mary's Prep	Detroit, MI
F	33	Hassan Drame	6 ft 7 in (2.01 m)	200 lb (91 kg)	GS	Our Savior New American; La Salle	Bamako, Mali
F	34	Fousseyni Drame	6 ft 7 in (2.01 m)	200 lb (91 kg)	GS	Our Savior New American; La Salle	Bamako, Mali
G	44	Jake DiMichele (W)	6 ft 4 in (1.93 m)	185 lb (84 kg)	Fr	First Love Christian Academy	McKees Rocks, PA
G	55	Kailon Nicholls	6 ft 0 in (1.83 m)	160 lb (73 kg)	Fr	Hargrave Military Academy	Toronto, ON

Head coach

- Keith Dambrot (Akron)

Assistant coach(es)

- Dru Joyce III (Akron)
- Rick McFadden (Akron)
- Terry Weigand (Ashland)
- Steve Wright (Bowling Green)
- Ari Stern (The College of Wooster)

Legend

- (C) Team captain
- (S) Suspended
- (I) Ineligible
- (W) Walk-on
- Injured
- Current redshirt

Roster
Last update: April 6, 2024

== Schedule and results ==
Date time, TV	Rank^{#}	Opponent^{#}	Result	Record	High points	High rebounds	High assists	Site (attendance) city, state
Regular season
November 6, 2023*; 7:00 p.m., SNPT/ESPN+		Cleveland State	W 79–77	1–0	21 – Grant	6 – Dixon	8 – Clark III	UPMC Cooper Fieldhouse (2,364); Pittsburgh, PA
November 10, 2023*; 6:00 p.m., CBSSN		vs. Charleston; Veterans Classic	W 90–72	2–0	22 – Grant	9 – F. Drame	7 – Clark III	Alumni Hall; Annapolis, MD
November 13, 2023*; 7:00 p.m., SNPT/ESPN+		Stony Brook; Cornhusker Classic	W 85–63	3–0	24 – Clark III	11 – F. Drame	7 – Rozier	UPMC Cooper Fieldhouse; Pittsburgh, PA
November 15, 2023*; 7:00 p.m., SNPT/ESPN+		Princeton	L 67–70	3–1	17 – Clark III	5 – Rozier	3 – tied	UPMC Cooper Fieldhouse (2,877); Pittsburgh, PA
November 17, 2023*; 7:00 p.m., SNPT/ESPN+		Rider; Cornhusker Classic	W 77–58	4–1	23 – Grant	10 – Drame	3 – Rozier	UPMC Cooper Fieldhouse (2,153); Pittsburgh, PA
November 22, 2023*; 8:00 p.m., BTN		at Nebraska; Cornhusker Classic	L 79–89	4–2	24 – Grant	8 – Drame	3 – Grant	Pinnacle Bank Arena (14,426); Lincoln, NE
November 29, 2023*; 7:00 p.m., SNPT/ESPN+		UC Irvine	W 66–62	5–2	15 – Savrasov	7 – Savrasov	5 – Clark III	UPMC Cooper Fieldhouse (2,193); Pittsburgh, PA
December 6, 2023*; 7:00 p.m., ESPN+		at Marshall	W 85–72	6–2	24 – Clark III	9 – Savrasov	4 – Rozier	Cam Henderson Center (3,947); Huntington, WV
December 8, 2023*; 7:00 p.m., ESPN+		Saint Peter's	W 68–59	7–2	19 – Grant	7 – Drame	5 – Clark III	UPMC Cooper Fieldhouse (2,088); Pittsburgh, PA
December 18, 2023*; 7:00 p.m.		vs. Bradley	W 69–67	8–2	21 – Clark III	5 – tied	4 – Clark III	LeBron James Arena (1,375); Akron, OH
December 23, 2023*; 5:00 p.m., FloSports		vs. Santa Clara	L 73–81	8–3	32 – Grant	5 – tied	3 – tied	Orleans Arena; Paradise, NV
December 30, 2023*; 2:00 p.m., ESPN+		Cleary	W 95–47	9–3	15 – tied	9 – Drame	5 – Grant	UPMC Cooper Fieldhouse (2,188); Pittsburgh, PA
January 3, 2024; 7:00 p.m., SNPT/ESPN+		at UMass	L 61–80	9–4 (0–1)	18 – Grant	9 – Drame	3 – tied	Mullins Center (2,561); Amherst, MA
January 6, 2024; 4:00 p.m., CBSSN		at Loyola Chicago	L 67–72	9–5 (0–2)	19 – Dixon	8 – Grant	5 – Rozier	Joseph J. Gentile Arena (2,671); Chicago, IL
January 12, 2024; 7:00 p.m., ESPN2		No. 16 Dayton	L 62–72	9–6 (0–3)	14 – Grant	7 – Dixon	5 – Rozier	UPMC Cooper Fieldhouse (3,724); Pittsburgh, PA
January 16, 2024; 7:00 p.m., SNPT/ESPN+		Richmond	L 61–63	9–7 (0–4)	16 – Clark III	6 – tied	4 – Clark III	UPMC Cooper Fieldhouse (2,463); Pittsburgh, PA
January 20, 2024; 2:30 p.m., USA		at Saint Joseph's	L 69–71	9–8 (0–5)	21 – Clark III	6 – Dixon	4 – Rozier	Hagan Arena (2,507); Philadelphia, PA
January 23, 2024; 7:00 p.m., ESPN+		St. Bonaventure	W 54–50	10–8 (1–5)	9 – Clark III	8 – Williams	4 – Hronský	UPMC Cooper Fieldhouse (2,489); Pittsburgh, PA
January 27, 2024; 12:30 p.m., USA		Fordham	W 68–59	11–8 (2–5)	15 – DiMichele	6 – Dixon	7 – Clark III	UPMC Cooper Fieldhouse (3,027); Pittsburgh, PA
January 31, 2024*; 7:00 p.m., SNPT/ESPN+		Chicago State	W 65–60	12–8	17 – Grant	10 – Drame	3 – tied	UPMC Cooper Fieldhouse (2,366); Pittsburgh, PA
February 3, 2024; 12:30 p.m., USA		at Rhode Island	W 85–71	13–8 (3–5)	31 – Grant	5 – Clark III	5 – tied	Ryan Center (5,822); Kingston, RI
February 7, 2024; 7:00 p.m., ESPN+		Davidson	L 59–72	13–9 (3–6)	15 – DiMichele	5 – tied	3 – Rozier	UPMC Cooper Fieldhouse (2,535); Pittsburgh, PA
February 10, 2024; 2:00 p.m., ESPNU		at St. Bonaventure	W 75–69	14–9 (4–6)	16 – Drame	14 – Drame	8 – Clark III	Reilly Center (4,750); Olean, NY
February 13, 2024; 7:00 p.m., ESPN+		at No. 16 Dayton	L 59–75	14–10 (4–7)	14 – Clark III	5 – Williams	6 – Grant	UD Arena (13,407); Dayton, OH
February 17, 2024; 2:30 p.m., USA		Saint Joseph's	W 66–56	15–10 (5–7)	17 – Dixon	10 – Dixon	4 – Clark III	UPMC Cooper Fieldhouse (3,017); Pittsburgh, PA
February 20, 2024; 7:00 p.m., ESPN+		Saint Louis	W 81–66	16–10 (6–7)	31 – Grant	9 – DiMichele	7 – Clark III	UPMC Cooper Fieldhouse (2,178); Pittsburgh, PA
February 23, 2024; 8:30 p.m., ESPN2		at Fordham	L 67–79	16–11 (6–8)	15 – Grant	4 – tied	2 – tied	Rose Hill Gymnasium (2,850); The Bronx, NY
February 28, 2024; 7:00 p.m., SNPT/ESPN+		La Salle	W 75–63	17–11 (7–8)	22 – Clark III	6 – Grant	8 – Clark III	UPMC Cooper Fieldhouse (2,233); Pittsburgh, PA
March 2, 2024; 2:00 p.m., ESPN+		at George Mason	W 59–51	18–11 (8–8)	13 – Grant	4 – tied	2 – tied	EagleBank Arena (5,058); Fairfax, VA
March 5, 2024; 7:00 p.m., ESPN+		at VCU	W 69–59	19–11 (9–8)	26 – Grant	6 – tied	4 – Clark III	Siegel Center (7,044); Richmond, VA
March 9, 2024; 2:00 p.m., SNPT/ESPN+		George Washington	W 67–65	20–11 (10–8)	22 – Clark III	7 – tied	3 – tied	UPMC Cooper Fieldhouse (3,134); Pittsburgh, PA
A-10 tournament
March 13, 2024; 7:30 p.m., USA	(6)	vs. (14) Saint Louis; Second Round	W 83–73	21–11	20 – Clark III	6 – Dixon	7 – Grant	Barclays Center (6,432); Brooklyn, NY
March 14, 2024; 7:30 p.m., USA	(6)	vs. (3) No. 24 Dayton; Quarterfinals	W 65–57	22–11	16 – Clark III	8 – Drame	4 – Clark III	Barclays Center (6,327); Brooklyn, NY
March 16, 2024; 3:30 p.m., CBSSN	(6)	vs. (7) St. Bonaventure; Semifinals	W 70–60	23–11	27 – Grant	8 – tied	6 – Clark III	Barclays Center (8,037); Brooklyn, NY
March 17, 2024; 1:00 p.m., CBS	(6)	vs. (5) VCU; Championship	W 57–51	24–11	10 – Grant	12 – Drame	3 – tied	Barclays Center (7,805); Brooklyn, NY
NCAA tournament
March 21, 2024; 12:40 p.m., TruTV	(11 E)	vs. (6 E) No. 21 BYU; First Round	W 71–67	25–11	19 – Grant	8 – F. Drame	4 – Clark III	CHI Health Center Omaha; Omaha, NE
March 23, 2024; 8:40 p.m., TNT	(11 E)	vs. (3 E) No. 10 Illinois; Second Round	L 63–89	25–12	14 – Clark III	6 – Dixon	4 – Clark III	CHI Health Center Omaha (17,387); Omaha, NE
*Non-conference game. ^{#}Rankings from AP poll. (#) Tournament seedings in parentheses. All times are in Eastern Time.
