= 2023–24 Davidson Wildcats men's basketball team =

American college basketball season

2023–24 Davidson Wildcats men's basketball
- Conference: Atlantic 10 Conference
- Record: 15–17 (5–13 A-10)
- Head coach: Matt McKillop (2nd season)
- Assistant coaches: Matt Matheny; Will Reigel; Joshua Heyliger
- Home arena: John M. Belk Arena

2023–24 Atlantic 10 men's basketball standings
	Conf.				Overall
Team	W		L	PCT	W		L	PCT
Richmond	15	–	3	.833	23	–	10	.697
Loyola Chicago	15	–	3	.833	23	–	10	.697
No. 24 Dayton	14	–	4	.778	25	–	8	.758
UMass	11	–	7	.611	20	–	11	.645
VCU	11	–	7	.611	24	–	14	.632
Duquesne †	10	–	8	.556	25	–	12	.676
St. Bonaventure	9	–	9	.500	20	–	13	.606
George Mason	9	–	9	.500	20	–	12	.625
Saint Joseph's	9	–	9	.500	21	–	14	.600
La Salle	6	–	12	.333	16	–	17	.485
Rhode Island	6	–	12	.333	12	–	20	.375
Fordham	6	–	12	.333	13	–	20	.394
Davidson	5	–	13	.278	15	–	17	.469
Saint Louis	5	–	13	.278	13	–	20	.394
George Washington	4	–	14	.222	15	–	17	.469
† 2024 A-10 tournament winner Rankings from AP poll

The 2023–24 Davidson Wildcats men's basketball team represented Davidson College during the 2023–24 NCAA Division I men's basketball season. The Wildcats were led by second-year head coach Matt McKillop and played their home games at the John M. Belk Arena in Davidson, North Carolina as members of the Atlantic 10 Conference (A-10).

== Previous season ==
The Wildcats finished the 2022–23 season 16–16, 8–10 in A-10 play, to finish in a three-way tie for eighth place. As an eighth seed, they defeated St. Bonaventure in the second round of the A-10 tournament before losing to VCU in the quarterfinals.

== Offseason ==
=== Departures ===
Name	Number	Pos.	Height	Weight	Year	Hometown	Reason for departure
Foster Loyer	0	G	6' 0"	175	GS Senior	Clarkston, MI	Graduated
Sam Mennenga	3	F	6' 9"	240	RS Junior	Auckland, New Zealand	Signed to play professionally in Australia with Cairns Taipans
Desmond Watson	4	G/F	6' 5"	205	Sophomore	Columbus, OH	Transferred to Loyola Chicago
Styrmir Snær Þrastarson	34	G/F	6' 7"	210	Sophomore	Reykjavík, Iceland	Signed to play professionally in Wallonia with Belfius Mons-Hainaut
Joe Thomson	50	F	6' 7"	190	Freshman	Sunderland, MA	Walk-on; no longer on team roster

=== Incoming transfers ===
Name	Num	Pos.	Height	Weight	Year	Hometown	Previous school
Jarvis Moss	0	G	6' 4"	190	Junior	Concord, NC	Stanford
Angelo Brizzi	14	G	6' 3"	190	RS Sophomore	Warrenton, VA	Villanova

=== Recruiting classes ===
==== 2023 recruiting class ====
College recruiting
Name	Hometown	School	Height	Weight	Commit date
Michael Loughnane; CG	Exeter, NH	Phillips Exeter Academy	6 ft 4 in (1.93 m)	170 lb (77 kg)	Jun 30, 2022
Michael Loughnane; CG	Recruit ratings: Scout: Rivals: 247Sports: ESPN: (NR)				
Bobby Durkin; SF	Bradenton, FL	IMG Academy	6 ft 7 in (2.01 m)	195 lb (88 kg)	Aug 3, 2022
Bobby Durkin; SF	Recruit ratings: Scout: Rivals: 247Sports: ESPN: (NR)				
Rikus Schulte; PF	Münster, Germany	Alba Berlin	6 ft 9 in (2.06 m)	N/A	Jul 12, 2023
Rikus Schulte; PF	Recruit ratings: Scout: Rivals: 247Sports: ESPN: (NR)				
Overall recruit ranking:
Note: In many cases, Scout, Rivals, 247Sports, On3, and ESPN may conflict in their listings of height and weight.; In these cases, the average was taken. ESPN grades are on a 100-point scale.; Sources: "2023 Team Ranking". Rivals.

==== 2024 recruiting class ====
College recruiting (2024)
Name	Hometown	School	Height	Weight	Commit date
Nick Coval; PG	Allentown, PA	Parkland High School	6 ft 1 in (1.85 m)	160 lb (73 kg)	Jun 27, 2023
Nick Coval; PG	Recruit ratings: Scout: Rivals: 247Sports: ESPN: (NR)				
Overall recruit ranking:
Note: In many cases, Scout, Rivals, 247Sports, On3, and ESPN may conflict in their listings of height and weight.; In these cases, the average was taken. ESPN grades are on a 100-point scale.; Sources: "2024 Team Ranking". Rivals.

== Roster ==
2023–24 Davidson Wildcats men's basketball team
Players
Coaches

Pos.	#	Name	Height	Weight	Year	Previous school	Hometown
G	0	Jarvis Moss	6 ft 4 in (1.93 m)	200 lb (91 kg)	Jr	Cannon School; Stanford	Concord, NC
G	1	Reed Bailey	6 ft 11 in (2.11 m)	220 lb (100 kg)	So	Brewster Academy	Harvard, MA
F	2	Bobby Durkin	6 ft 7 in (2.01 m)	215 lb (98 kg)	Fr	Glenbard West High School	Darien, IL
G	3	Achile Spadone (W)	6 ft 4 in (1.93 m)	195 lb (88 kg)	So	Isberne	Geneva, Switzerland
G	4	Mike Loughnane	6 ft 4 in (1.93 m)	200 lb (91 kg)	Fr	Phillips Exeter Academy	Quincy, MA
G	5	Grant Huffman (C)	6 ft 4 in (1.93 m)	190 lb (86 kg)	Sr	St. Edward's High School	Aurora, OH
G	12	Hunter Adam	6 ft 7 in (2.01 m)	215 lb (98 kg)	RS Fr	Christs College of Canterbury	Christchurch, New Zealand
G	14	Angelo Brizzi	6 ft 3 in (1.91 m)	190 lb (86 kg)	RS So	Highland School; Villanova	Warrenton, VA
F	15	Sean Logan	6 ft 10 in (2.08 m)	220 lb (100 kg)	So	Westfield High School	Westfield, NJ
F	20	Rikus Schulte	6 ft 9 in (2.06 m)	240 lb (109 kg)	Fr	SLZB	Münster, Germany
G	22	Riccardo Ghedini	6 ft 7 in (2.01 m)	210 lb (95 kg)	RS So	Collegio San Carlo	Milan, Italy
G	23	Connor Kochera (C)	6 ft 5 in (1.96 m)	205 lb (93 kg)	Sr	St. Viator High School; William & Mary	Arlington Heights, IL
G/F	24	Michael Katsock (W)	6 ft 6 in (1.98 m)	205 lb (93 kg)	Jr	St. Albans School	Washington, D.C.
C	42	David Skogman (C)	6 ft 10 in (2.08 m)	235 lb (107 kg)	RS Sr	Waukesha West High School; Buffalo	Waukesha, WI
G	51	Brock Matheny (W)	5 ft 10 in (1.78 m)	155 lb (70 kg)	So	Burlington Christian Academy	Davidson, NC
G	55	Chris Sosnik (W,C)	6 ft 2 in (1.88 m)	195 lb (88 kg)	Sr	St. Albans School	Washington, D.C.

Head coach

- Matt McKillop (Davidson)

Assistant coach(es)

- Will Reigel (Davidson)
- Matt Matheny (Davidson)
- Joshua Heyliger (Stonehill)

Legend

- (C) Team captain
- (S) Suspended
- (I) Ineligible
- (W) Walk-on
- Injured
- Current redshirt

Roster
Last update: April 7, 2024

== Schedule and results ==
Date time, TV	Rank^{#}	Opponent^{#}	Result	Record	High points	High rebounds	High assists	Site (attendance) city, state
Non-conference regular season
November 6, 2023*; 7:00 p.m., ESPN+		Washington and Lee	W 86–63	1–0	15 – Brizzi	9 – Bailey	4 – Huffman	John M. Belk Arena (2,404); Davidson, NC
November 10, 2023*; 7:00 p.m., ESPNU		vs. Maryland; Asheville Championship semifinals	W 64–61	2–0	16 – Durkin	8 – Skogman	7 – Huffman	Harrah's Cherokee Center; Asheville, NC
November 12, 2023*; 3:00 p.m., ESPN2		vs. Clemson; Asheville Championship game	L 65–68	2–1	12 – Huffman	7 – tied	5 – Huffman	Harrah's Cherokee Center (3,129); Asheville, NC
November 17, 2023*; 7:00 p.m., ESPN+		at East Tennessee State	L 68–70	2–2	17 – Bailey	6 – Kochera	2 – Skogman	Freedom Hall Civic Center (4,479); Johnson City, TN
November 21, 2023*; 7:00 p.m., ESPN+		Boston University	W 69–45	3–2	23 – Kochera	8 – Bailey	6 – Huffman	John M. Belk Arena (2,463); Davidson, NC
November 24, 2023*; 4:00 p.m., ESPN+		at Saint Mary's (CA)	L 55–89	3–3	13 – Huffman	3 – tied	2 – Huffman	University Credit Union Pavilion (3,411); Moraga, CA
November 29, 2023*; 8:00 p.m., ESPN+		at Charlotte	W 85–81	4–3	30 – Skogman	7 – Skogman	11 – Huffman	Dale F. Halton Arena (4,030); Charlotte, NC
December 2, 2023*; 3:00 p.m., ESPN+		Wright State	W 82–73	5–3	20 – Huffman	8 – Bailey	7 – Huffman	John M. Belk Arena (2,783); Davidson, NC
December 6, 2023*; 7:00 p.m., ESPN+		Campbell	W 62–50	6–3	13 – Durkin	8 – Durkin	3 – tied	John M. Belk Arena (2,223); Davidson, NC
December 9, 2023*; 2:00 p.m., ESPN+		Miami (OH)	W 79–61	7–3	19 – tied	7 – tied	3 – tied	John M. Belk Arena (2,838); Davidson, NC
December 16, 2023*; 3:00 p.m., ESPN+		Lynchburg	W 98–63	8–3	17 – Kochera	4 – Spadone	8 – Huffman	John M. Belk Arena (2,148); Davidson, NC
December 21, 2023*; 7:00 p.m., ESPN+		USC Upstate	W 62–59	9–3	14 – Huffman	8 – Durkin	5 – Huffman	John M. Belk Arena (2,839); Davidson, NC
December 30, 2023*; 1:30 p.m., ESPN+		vs. Ohio; Legends of Basketball Showcase	W 72–69	10–3	15 – tied	7 – Kochera	3 – Bailey	Rocket Mortgage FieldHouse; Cleveland, OH
Atlantic 10 regular season
January 3, 2024; 7:00 p.m., CBSSN		Dayton	L 59–72	10–4 (0–1)	14 – Durkin	6 – Durkin	5 – Huffman	John M. Belk Arena (3,244); Davidson, NC
January 9, 2024; 7:00 p.m., ESPN+		Rhode Island	L 74–79	10–5 (0–2)	20 – Skogman	4 – tied	5 – Huffman	John M. Belk Arena (2,511); Davidson, NC
January 13, 2024; 2:00 p.m., ESPN+		at George Washington	L 79–83 ^{OT}	10–6 (0–3)	24 – Huffman	7 – tied	5 – Huffman	Charles E. Smith Center (1,863); Washington, D.C.
January 17, 2024; 7:00 p.m., ESPN+		at Fordham	W 79–69	11–6 (1–3)	24 – tied	12 – Bailey	3 – Huffman	Rose Hill Gymnasium (1,895); The Bronx, New York
January 20, 2024; 4:00 p.m., ESPN+		Richmond	L 64–69 ^{OT}	11–7 (1–4)	24 – Skogman	8 – Skogman	5 – Huffman	John M. Belk Arena (4,235); Davidson, NC
January 24, 2024; 7:00 p.m., ESPN+		at Saint Louis	W 84–61	12–7 (2–4)	23 – Huffman	7 – tied	5 – tied	Chaifetz Arena (5.647); St. Louis, MO
January 27, 2024; 8:00 p.m., CBSSN		VCU	L 58–63	12–8 (2–5)	19 – Kochera	9 – Bailey	5 – Huffman	John M. Belk Arena (3,861); Davidson, NC
February 4, 2024; 1:00 p.m., CBSSN		at Loyola Chicago	L 63–76	12–9 (2–6)	23 – tied	8 – Huffman	7 – Huffman	Joseph J. Gentile Arena (4,253); Chicago, IL
February 7, 2024; 7:00 p.m., ESPN+		at Duquesne	W 72–59	13–9 (3–6)	19 – Kochera	8 – Bailey	6 – Durkin	UPMC Cooper Fieldhouse (2,535); Pittsburgh, PA
February 10, 2024; 2:30 p.m., USA		George Mason	L 55–57	13–10 (3–7)	22 – Bailey	6 – Bailey	4 – Huffman	John M. Belk Arena (3,609); Davidson, NC
February 13, 2024; 7:00 p.m., ESPN+		La Salle	W 71–56	14–10 (4–7)	22 – Bailey	12 – Bailey	7 – Huffman	John M. Belk Arena (2,268); Davidson, NC
February 17, 2024; 3:30 p.m., CBSSN		at St. Bonaventure	L 80–81 ^{OT}	14–11 (4–8)	29 – Kochera	8 – tied	8 – Huffman	Reilly Center (4,750); Olean, NY
February 20, 2024; 7:00 p.m., ESPN+		Fordham	W 68–53	15–11 (5–8)	21 – Kochera	6 – tied	4 – Huffman	John M. Belk Arena (3,009); Davidson, NC
February 24, 2024; 6:00 p.m., ESPN+		at Richmond	L 63–66	15–12 (5–9)	23 – Bailey	11 – Bailey	4 – Huffman	Robins Center (7,201); Richmond, VA
February 27, 2024; 7:00 p.m., ESPN+		at No. 21 Dayton	L 66–80	15–13 (5–10)	18 – Kochera	7 – Huffman	3 – tied	UD Arena (13,407); Dayton, OH
March 2, 2024; 2:30 p.m., USA		UMass	L 67–69	15–14 (5–11)	22 – Bailey	6 – tied	9 – Huffman	John M. Belk Arena (3,771); Davidson, NC
March 6, 2024; 7:00 p.m., ESPN+		Loyola Chicago	L 59–69	15–15 (5–12)	22 – Kochera	7 – Bailey	6 – Huffman	John M. Belk Arena (2,856); Davidson, NC
March 9, 2024; 1:00 p.m., ESPN+		at Saint Joseph's	L 71–89	15–16 (5–13)	19 – Bailey	8 – Huffman	9 – Huffman	Hagan Arena (2,257); Philadelphia, PA
Atlantic 10 tournament
March 13, 2024; 11:30 a.m., ESPN+	(13)	vs. (12) Fordham; First round	L 63–71 ^{OT}	15–17	24 – Kochera	7 – Kochera	5 – Huffman	Barclays Center; Brooklyn, NY
*Non-conference game. ^{#}Rankings from AP poll. (#) Tournament seedings in parentheses. All times are in Eastern.
