= 2023–24 George Washington Revolutionaries men's basketball team =

American college basketball season

2023–24 George Washington Revolutionaries men's basketball
- Conference: Atlantic 10 Conference
- Record: 15–17 (4–14 A–10)
- Head coach: Chris Caputo (2nd season)
- Assistant coaches: Dwayne Lee; Zak Boisvert; Lamont Franklin
- Home arena: Charles E. Smith Center

2023–24 Atlantic 10 men's basketball standings
	Conf.				Overall
Team	W		L	PCT	W		L	PCT
Richmond	15	–	3	.833	23	–	10	.697
Loyola Chicago	15	–	3	.833	23	–	10	.697
No. 24 Dayton	14	–	4	.778	25	–	8	.758
UMass	11	–	7	.611	20	–	11	.645
VCU	11	–	7	.611	24	–	14	.632
Duquesne †	10	–	8	.556	25	–	12	.676
St. Bonaventure	9	–	9	.500	20	–	13	.606
George Mason	9	–	9	.500	20	–	12	.625
Saint Joseph's	9	–	9	.500	21	–	14	.600
La Salle	6	–	12	.333	16	–	17	.485
Rhode Island	6	–	12	.333	12	–	20	.375
Fordham	6	–	12	.333	13	–	20	.394
Davidson	5	–	13	.278	15	–	17	.469
Saint Louis	5	–	13	.278	13	–	20	.394
George Washington	4	–	14	.222	15	–	17	.469
† 2024 A-10 tournament winner Rankings from AP poll

The 2023–24 George Washington Revolutionaries men's basketball team represented George Washington University during the 2023–24 NCAA Division I men's basketball season. The team, led by second-year head coach Chris Caputo, played their home games at Charles E. Smith Center in Washington, D.C. as a member of the Atlantic 10 Conference (A-10). They finished the season 15–17, 4–14 in A-10 play, to finish in last (15th) place.

On May 24, 2023, the school changed the nickname of its athletic teams to Revolutionaries. The school's teams were previously nicknamed the Colonials.

== Previous season ==
The Colonials finished the 2022–23 season 16–16, 10–8 in A-10 play, to finish in a tie for sixth place. They lost to Saint Joseph's in the second round of the A-10 tournament.

== Offseason ==
=== Departures ===
Name	Number	Pos.	Height	Weight	Year	Hometown	Reason for departure
E. J. Clark	1	G	5' 11"	165	GS Senior	Dallas, TX	Graduated
Amir Harris	3	G	6' 5"	210	GS Senior	Frederick, MD	Graduated
Ricky Lindo Jr.	4	F	6' 8"	220	RS Senior	Washington, D.C.	Graduated
Jabari West Jr.	5	F	6' 8"	230	Freshman	Hot Springs, AR	Transferred to South Plains College
Brendan Adams	10	G	6' 4"	205	GS Senior	Baltimore, MD	Graduated
Hunter Dean	13	F	6' 10"	235	Senior	Mandeville, LA	Graduate transferred to LSU
Qwanzi Samuels	20	F	6' 9"	205	Senior	District Heights, MD	Graduate transferred to IUPUI
Noel Brown	21	C	6' 11"	260	Junior	Leesburg, VA	Transferred to St. Bonaventure
Daniel Nixon	23	F	6' 7"	225	Sophomore	White Plains, NY	Transferred to Western Texas College
Theofanis Stamoulis	34	G	6' 3"	175	GS Senior	Athens, Greece	Walk-on; graduated

=== Incoming transfers ===
Name	Number	Pos.	Height	Weight	Year	Hometown	Previous school
Darren Buchanan Jr.	3	F	6' 7"	235	Sophomore	Washington, D.C.	Virginia Tech
Garrett Johnson	9	G	6' 8"	210	RS Freshman	Oakton, VA	Princeton
Babatunde Akingbola	23	C	6' 10"	245	GS Senior	Ogun, Nigeria	Auburn
Benny Schröder	24	G	6' 7"	198	Sophomore	Munich, Germany	Oklahoma
Antoine Smith	34	F	6' 7"		GS Senior	Westerville, OH	Evansville

=== Recruiting classes ===
==== 2023 recruiting class ====
College recruiting information
Name	Hometown	School	Height	Weight	Commit date
Jacoi Hutchinson #58 PG	Bradenton, FL	IMG Academy	6 ft 1 in (1.85 m)	165 lb (75 kg)	Oct 31, 2022
Jacoi Hutchinson #58 PG	Recruit ratings: Scout: Rivals: 247Sports: ESPN: (79)				
Christian Jones; SG	The Bronx, NY	Our Saviour Lutheran School	6 ft 4 in (1.93 m)	170 lb (77 kg)	Oct 22, 2022
Christian Jones; SG	Recruit ratings: Scout: Rivals: 247Sports: ESPN: (NR)				
Trey Autry; SG	Hudson, OH	Western Reserve Academy	6 ft 3 in (1.91 m)	180 lb (82 kg)	Oct 17, 2022
Trey Autry; SG	Recruit ratings: Scout: Rivals: 247Sports: ESPN: (NR)				
Zamoku Weluche-Ume; PF	London, England	Barking Abbey School	6 ft 8 in (2.03 m)	N/A	May 8, 2023
Zamoku Weluche-Ume; PF	Recruit ratings: Scout: Rivals: 247Sports: ESPN: (NR)				
Overall recruit ranking:
Note: In many cases, Scout, Rivals, 247Sports, On3, and ESPN may conflict in their listings of height and weight.; In these cases, the average was taken. ESPN grades are on a 100-point scale.; Sources: "2023 Team Ranking". Rivals.

== Roster ==
2023–24 George Washington Revolutionaries men's basketball team
Players
Coaches

Pos.	#	Name	Height	Weight	Year	Previous school	Hometown
G	0	Trey Autry	6 ft 4 in (1.93 m)	200 lb (91 kg)	Fr	Western Reserve Academy	Jamesville, NY
G	1	Amir Arrington (W)	5 ft 10 in (1.78 m)	170 lb (77 kg)	Fr	The Galloway School	Atlanta, GA
G	2	Maximus Edwards	6 ft 5 in (1.96 m)	215 lb (98 kg)	RS So	Kansas State	Stratford, CT
F	3	Darren Jr. Buchanan	6 ft 7 in (2.01 m)	235 lb (107 kg)	RS Fr	Virginia Tech	Washington, D.C.
G	4	Jacoi Hutchinson	6 ft 3 in (1.91 m)	185 lb (84 kg)	Fr	IMG Academy	Laurel, MD
G	5	Christian Jones	6 ft 2 in (1.88 m)	190 lb (86 kg)	Fr	Our Saviour Lutheran School	Stratford, CT
F	8	Zamoku Weluche-Ume	6 ft 8 in (2.03 m)	220 lb (100 kg)	Fr	Barking Abbey School	London, England
G/F	9	Garrett Johnson	6 ft 8 in (2.03 m)	210 lb (95 kg)	RS Fr	Princeton	Oakton, VA
G	10	Laziz Talipov (W)	6 ft 1 in (1.85 m)	165 lb (75 kg)	Jr	Trinity Preparatory School	Orlando, FL
G	11	James IV Bishop	6 ft 2 in (1.88 m)	190 lb (86 kg)	Sr	LSU	Baltimore, MD
F	14	Keegan Harvey	6 ft 11 in (2.11 m)	230 lb (104 kg)	RS Jr	Charleston	Newcastle, Australia
C	23	Babatunde Akingbola	6 ft 10 in (2.08 m)	225 lb (102 kg)	GS	Auburn	Ogun, Nigeria
G/F	24	Benny Schröder	6 ft 7 in (2.01 m)	200 lb (91 kg)	So	Oklahoma	Munich, Germany
F	32	Luke Cronin (W)	6 ft 8 in (2.03 m)	215 lb (98 kg)	Fr	Great Neck North High School	Great Neck, NY
F	34	Antoine Jr. Smith	6 ft 7 in (2.01 m)	210 lb (95 kg)	GS	Evansville	Westerville, OH

Head coach

- Chris Caputo (Westfield State)

Assistant coach(es)

- Dwayne Lee (Saint Joseph's)
- Zak Boisvert (Fordham)
- Lamont Franklin (UNC Wilmington)

Legend

- (C) Team captain
- (S) Suspended
- (I) Ineligible
- (W) Walk-on
- Injured
- Current redshirt

Roster
Last update: December 10, 2023

== Schedule and results ==
Date time, TV	Rank^{#}	Opponent^{#}	Result	Record	High points	High rebounds	High assists	Site (attendance) city, state
Non-conference regular season
November 6, 2023*; 8:00 p.m., ESPN+		Stonehill	W 89–44	1–0	21 – Johnson	9 – Johnson	3 – Akingbola	Charles E. Smith Center (2,303); Washington, D.C.
November 11, 2023*; 1:00 p.m., ESPN+		William & Mary	W 95–89	2–0	32 – Bishop IV	11 – Edwards	5 – Bishop IV	Charles E. Smith Center (1,754); Washington, D.C.
November 14, 2023*; 7:00 p.m., ESPN+		Hofstra	W 71–60	3–0	17 – Bishop IV	8 – Johnson	5 – Buchanan Jr.	Charles E. Smith Center (1,169); Washington, D.C.
November 18, 2023*; 1:00 p.m., ESPN+		New Hampshire	W 79–67	4–0	18 – Johnson	10 – Johnson	8 – Bishop IV	Charles E. Smith Center (1,009); Washington, D.C.
November 24, 2023*; 7:00 p.m., FloSports		vs. Ohio; Nassau Championship quarterfinals	W 99–94 ^{2OT}	5–0	28 – Bishop IV	13 – Edwards	5 – Bishop IV	Baha Mar Convention Center (277); Nassau, Bahamas
November 25, 2023*; 7:00 p.m., FloSports		vs. UIC; Nassau Championship semifinals	L 79–89	5–1	22 – Bishop IV	7 – Edwards	6 – Bishop IV	Baha Mar Convention Center (297); Nassau, Bahamas
November 26, 2023*; 1:30 p.m., FloSports		vs. Delaware; Nassau Championship 3rd-place game	W 81–71	6–1	28 – Bishop IV	9 – Akingbola	4 – Bishop IV	Baha Mar Convention Center (379); Nassau, Bahamas
December 1, 2023*; 7:00 p.m., SECN+/ESPN+		at South Carolina	L 67–89	6–2	18 – Buchanan Jr.	8 – Edwards	5 – Hutchinson	Colonial Life Arena (10,936); Columbia, SC
December 5, 2023*; 7:00 p.m., Monumental/ESPN+		Navy	W 79–77 ^{OT}	7–2	18 – 2 tied	11 – Johnson	4 – Bishop IV	Charles E. Smith Center (1,869); Washington, D.C.
December 9, 2023*; 6:00 p.m., ESPN+		Coppin State	W 76–45	8–2	14 – Buchanan Jr.	8 – 2 tied	6 – Bishop IV	Charles E. Smith Center (1,363); Washington, D.C.
December 12, 2023*; 7:00 p.m., ESPN+		Bowie State	W 88–73	9–2	13 – 2 tied	7 – Autry	6 – Buchanan Jr.	Charles E. Smith Center (1,204); Washington, D.C.
December 21, 2023*; 2:00 p.m., ESPN+		Alcorn State	W 79–75	10–2	23 – Johnson	10 – Buchanan Jr.	5 – Bishop IV	Charles E. Smith Center (1,149); Washington, D.C.
December 30, 2023*; 6:00 p.m., ESPN+		Maryland Eastern Shore	W 69–63	11–2	18 – Johnson	10 – Johnson	3 – 2 tied	Charles E. Smith Center (1,020); Washington, D.C.
Atlantic 10 regular season
January 3, 2024; 7:00 p.m., ESPN+		Fordham	L 113–119 ^{3OT}	11–3 (0–1)	38 – Buchanan Jr.	11 – Edwards	6 – Bishop IV	Charles E. Smith Center (1,258); Washington, D.C.
January 6, 2024; 4:00 p.m., USA		at VCU	W 84–82	12–3 (1–1)	28 – Bishop IV	6 – Edwards	3 – Bishop IV	Siegel Center (7,207); Richmond, VA
January 13, 2024; 2:00 p.m., Monumental/ESPN+		Davidson	W 83–79 ^{OT}	13–3 (2–1)	23 – Johnson	13 – Edwards	7 – Bishop IV	Charles E. Smith Center (1,863); Washington, D.C.
January 15, 2024; 2:00 p.m., CBSSN		George Mason; Revolutionary Rivalry	W 75–62	14–3 (3–1)	21 – Buchanan Jr.	11 – Akingbola	3 – 2 tied	Charles E. Smith Center (2,585); Washington, D.C.
January 20, 2024; 12:00 p.m., ESPN+		at UMass	L 67–81	14–4 (3–2)	16 – Johnson	11 – Edwards	3 – 3 tied	Mullins Center (3,586); Amherst, MA
January 24, 2024; 7:00 p.m., NBC Sports App		at Richmond	L 74–82	14–5 (3–3)	17 – Johnson	14 – Akingbola	3 – Bishop IV	Robins Center (5,082); Richmond, VA
January 27, 2024; 6:00 p.m., Monumental/ESPN+		La Salle	L 70–80	14–6 (3–4)	24 – Buchanan Jr.	12 – Buchanan Jr.	4 – Bishop IV	Charles E. Smith Center (2,054); Washington, D.C.
January 30, 2024; 7:00 p.m., ESPN+		at No. 21 Dayton	L 61–83	14–7 (3–5)	13 – Buchanan Jr.	8 – Buchanan Jr.	3 – Bishop IV	UD Arena (13,407); Dayton, OH
February 6, 2024; 7:00 p.m., ESPN+		Rhode Island	L 65–88	14–8 (3–6)	23 – Buchanan Jr.	6 – 3 tied	5 – Bishop IV	Charles E. Smith Center (1,272); Washington, D.C.
February 10, 2024; 12:00 p.m., Monumental/ESPN+		Loyola Chicago	L 73–81	14–9 (3–7)	25 – Bishop IV	8 – 2 tied	7 – Bishop IV	Charles E. Smith Center (2,520); Washington, D.C.
February 13, 2024; 7:00 p.m., ESPN+		at George Mason; Revolutionary Rivalry	L 67–90	14–10 (3–8)	13 – Smith Jr.	6 – 2 tied	3 – Hutchinson	EagleBank Arena (3,390); Fairfax, VA
February 17, 2024; 12:30 p.m., USA		Richmond	L 74–90	14–11 (3–9)	23 – Bishop IV	9 – Akingbola	4 – Bishop IV	Charles E. Smith Center (2,233); Washington, D.C.
February 21, 2024; 7:00 p.m., ESPN+		at Saint Joseph's	L 75–79	14–12 (3–10)	32 – Bishop IV	7 – Hutchinson	5 – Hutchinson	Hagan Arena (1,707); Philadelphia, PA
February 24, 2024; 3:00 p.m., ESPN+		at Saint Louis	L 91–96	14–13 (3–11)	34 – Bishop IV	7 – Hutchinson	6 – Bishop IV	Chaifetz Arena (7,239); St. Louis, MO
February 27, 2024; 7:00 p.m., ESPN+		UMass	L 57–69	14–14 (3–12)	21 – Buchanan Jr.	7 – Buchanan Jr.	4 – Bishop IV	Charles E. Smith Center (1,259); Washington, D.C.
March 2, 2024; 2:00 p.m., ESPN+		at La Salle	L 66–72	14–15 (3–13)	21 – Buchanan Jr.	7 – Akingbola	2 – 3 tied	Tom Gola Arena (2,278); Philadelphia, PA
March 6, 2024; 7:00 p.m., ESPN+		St. Bonaventure	W 86–75	15–15 (4–13)	27 – Bishop IV	7 – Edwards	7 – Hutchinson	Charles E. Smith Center (1,428); Washington, D.C.
March 9, 2024; 2:00 p.m., ESPN+		at Duquesne	L 65–67	15–16 (4–14)	19 – Buchanan Jr.	7 – Buchanan Jr.	4 – 2 tied	UPMC Cooper Fieldhouse (3,134); Pittsburgh, PA
A-10 tournament
March 12, 2024; 2:00 p.m., ESPN+	(15)	vs. (10) La Salle; First round	L 60–61	15–17	19 – Bishop IV	10 – Akingbola	6 – Buchanan Jr.	Barclays Center; Brooklyn, NY
*Non-conference game. ^{#}Rankings from AP poll. (#) Tournament seedings in parentheses. All times are in Eastern.
