= 2023–24 Saint Joseph's Hawks men's basketball team =

American college basketball season

2023–24 Saint Joseph's Hawks men's basketball
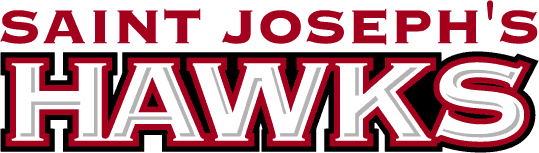

Big 5 Classic champions

NIT, First Round
- Conference: Atlantic 10 Conference
- Record: 21–14 (9–9 A–10)
- Head coach: Billy Lange (5th season)
- Associate head coach: Justin Scott
- Assistant coaches: John Linehan; Thomas Boyle
- Home arena: Hagan Arena

2023–24 Atlantic 10 men's basketball standings
	Conf.				Overall
Team	W		L	PCT	W		L	PCT
Richmond	15	–	3	.833	23	–	10	.697
Loyola Chicago	15	–	3	.833	23	–	10	.697
No. 24 Dayton	14	–	4	.778	25	–	8	.758
UMass	11	–	7	.611	20	–	11	.645
VCU	11	–	7	.611	24	–	14	.632
Duquesne †	10	–	8	.556	25	–	12	.676
St. Bonaventure	9	–	9	.500	20	–	13	.606
George Mason	9	–	9	.500	20	–	12	.625
Saint Joseph's	9	–	9	.500	21	–	14	.600
La Salle	6	–	12	.333	16	–	17	.485
Rhode Island	6	–	12	.333	12	–	20	.375
Fordham	6	–	12	.333	13	–	20	.394
Davidson	5	–	13	.278	15	–	17	.469
Saint Louis	5	–	13	.278	13	–	20	.394
George Washington	4	–	14	.222	15	–	17	.469
† 2024 A-10 tournament winner Rankings from AP poll

The 2023–24 Saint Joseph's Hawks basketball team represented Saint Joseph's University during the 2023–24 NCAA Division I men's basketball season. The Hawks, led by fifth-year head coach Billy Lange, played their home games at Hagan Arena in Philadelphia, Pennsylvania as members of the Atlantic 10 Conference.

== Previous season ==
The Hawks finished the 2022–23 season with a 16–17 overall record and an 8–10 mark in A-10 play, ending in a three-way tie for eighth place.

As the No. 10 seed in the A-10 Tournament, they defeated Loyola Chicago in the first round and George Washington in the second before falling to Dayton in the quarterfinals.

== Offseason ==
=== Departures ===
Name	Number	Pos.	Height	Weight	Year	Hometown	Reason for departure
Anton Jansson	10	C	6'11"	250	Junior	Stockhol, Sweden	Transferred
Quin Berger	12	G	6'1"	200	Freshman	Malvern, PA	Transferred to Bucknell
Ejike Obinna	50	F/C	6'10"	245	GS Senior	Enugu, Nigeria	Graduated
Louis Bleechmore	55	F	6'5"	200	Junior	Sydney, Australia	Transferred to Fairfield

=== Recruiting classes ===
==== 2023 recruiting class ====
College recruiting information
Name	Hometown	School	Height	Weight	Commit date
Xzayvier Brown #35 PG	Philadelphia, PA	Roman Catholic High School	6 ft 0 in (1.83 m)	160 lb (73 kg)	Jul 28, 2022
Xzayvier Brown #35 PG	Recruit ratings: Scout: Rivals: 247Sports: ESPN: (80)				
Shawn Simmons #42 PF	Phoenix, AZ	Hillcrest Prep	6 ft 7 in (2.01 m)	185 lb (84 kg)	Aug 20, 2022
Shawn Simmons #42 PF	Recruit ratings: Scout: Rivals: 247Sports: ESPN: (79)				
Anthony Finkley #48 PF	Philadelphia, PA	Roman Catholic High School	6 ft 7 in (2.01 m)	N/A	Jun 20, 2022
Anthony Finkley #48 PF	Recruit ratings: Scout: Rivals: 247Sports: ESPN: (79)				
Dasear Haskins; PF	Camden, NJ	Camden High School	6 ft 9 in (2.06 m)	N/A	Apr 12, 2023
Dasear Haskins; PF	Recruit ratings: No ratings found				
Overall recruit ranking:
Note: In many cases, Scout, Rivals, 247Sports, On3, and ESPN may conflict in their listings of height and weight.; In these cases, the average was taken. ESPN grades are on a 100-point scale.; Sources: "Saint Joseph's Hawks". ESPN.; "2023 Team Ranking". Rivals.

== Roster ==
2023–24 Saint Joseph's Hawks men's basketball team
Players
Coaches

Pos.	#	Name	Height	Weight	Year	Previous school	Hometown
G	0	Kacper Klaczek	6 ft 8 in (2.03 m)	225 lb (102 kg)	Jr	Long Island Lutheran High School	Chorzów, Poland
G	1	Christian Winborne	6 ft 2 in (1.88 m)	185 lb (84 kg)	So	Gilman School	Baltimore, Maryland
G	2	Erik Reynolds II	6 ft 2 in (1.88 m)	175 lb (79 kg)	Jr	Bullis School	Potomac, Maryland
G	3	Cameron Brown	6 ft 5 in (1.96 m)	225 lb (102 kg)	GS	Eleanor Roosevelt High School	Laurel, Maryland
G	5	Lynn Greer III	6 ft 2 in (1.88 m)	180 lb (82 kg)	Jr	Dayton	Philadelphia, Pennsylvania
G	10	Shawn Simmons II	6 ft 6 in (1.98 m)	190 lb (86 kg)	Fr	Hillcrest Prep (AZ)	Philadelphia, Pennsylvania
G	11	Xzayvier Brown	6 ft 2 in (1.88 m)	165 lb (75 kg)	Fr	Roman Catholic	Philadelphia, Pennsylvania
F	13	Rasheer Fleming	6 ft 9 in (2.06 m)	230 lb (104 kg)	So	Camden High School	Camden, New Jersey
G	15	Cooper Vogel (W)	6 ft 3 in (1.91 m)	180 lb (82 kg)	Sr	Howell High School	Howell, New Jersey
G	20	Chris Arizin (W)	6 ft 3 in (1.91 m)	200 lb (91 kg)	Sr	St. Joseph's Prep	Media, Pennsylvania
C	22	Christ Essandoko	7 ft 0 in (2.13 m)	285 lb (129 kg)	RS Fr	Winston Salem Christian School	Paris, France
F	23	Anthony Finkley	6 ft 6 in (1.98 m)	240 lb (109 kg)	Fr	Roman Catholic	Philadelphia, Pennsylvania
G	25	Brian Geatens (W)	6 ft 0 in (1.83 m)	180 lb (82 kg)	Sr	St. Joseph's Prep	Harleysville, Pennsylvania
F/C	32	Charles Coleman	7 ft 0 in (2.13 m)	265 lb (120 kg)	RS Sr	East Carolina	Boston, Massachusetts
F	35	Dasear Haskins	6 ft 8 in (2.03 m)	185 lb (84 kg)	Fr	Camden	Willingboro, New Jersey

Head coach

- Billy Lange (Rowan)

Assistant coach(es)

- Justin Scott (East Stroudsburg)
- John Linehan (Providence)
- Thomas Boyle (Saint Joseph's)

Legend

- (C) Team captain
- (S) Suspended
- (I) Ineligible
- (W) Walk-on
- Injured
- Current redshirt

Roster

== Schedule and results ==
Date time, TV	Rank^{#}	Opponent^{#}	Result	Record	High points	High rebounds	High assists	Site (attendance) city, state
Exhibition
October 28, 2023*; 1:00 p.m., –		Manhattan	W 78–68	–	18 – Greer III	15 – Essandoko	6 – Essandoko	Hagan Arena (1,234); Philadelphia, PA
Non-conference regular season
November 6, 2023*; 7:00 p.m., ESPN+		Lafayette	W 81–60	1–0	18 – Reynolds II	6 – Klaczek	4 – Tied	Hagan Arena (1,793); Philadelphia, PA
November 10, 2023*; 6:30 p.m., ESPN+		Penn; Big 5 Classic Pod 1	W 69–61	2–0	13 – Tied	10 – Essandoko	11 – Greer III	Hagan Arena (2,738); Philadelphia, PA
November 14, 2023*; 7:00 p.m., ESPN+		Stonehill; Wildcat Challenge	W 100–56	3–0	21 – X. Brown	6 – Finkley	4 – Tied	Hagan Arena (1,734); Philadelphia, PA
November 17, 2023*; 7:00 p.m., ESPN+		Texas A&M–Commerce; Wildcat Challenge	L 54–57	3–1	13 – Greer III	8 – C. Brown	3 – Greer III	Hagan Arena (1,901); Philadelphia, PA
November 20, 2023*; 7:00 p.m., SECN		at No. 16 Kentucky; Wildcat Challenge	L 88–96 ^{OT}	3–2	28 – Reynolds II	9 – Tied	6 – X. Brown	Rupp Arena (18,680); Lexington, KY
November 26, 2023*; 1:00 p.m., ESPN+		Sacred Heart	W 64–55	4–2	16 – C. Brown	7 – Greer III	5 – X. Brown	Hagan Arena (1,501); Philadelphia, PA
November 29, 2023*; 6:30 p.m., FS1		at No. 18 Villanova; Big 5 Classic Pod 2/Holy War	W 78–65	5–2	24 – Reynolds II	11 – Fleming	7 – Greer III	Finneran Pavilion (6,501); Villanova, PA
December 2, 2023*; 7:30 p.m., NBCPHI+/Peacock		vs. Temple; Big 5 Classic championship game	W 74–65	6–2	22 – Fleming	9 – Fleming	5 – Reynolds	Wells Fargo Center (15,215); Philadelphia, PA
December 6, 2023*; 7:00 p.m., ESPN+		American	W 69–53	7–2	20 – X. Brown	9 – Fleming	5 – Reynolds II	Hagan Arena (1,517); Philadelphia, PA
December 10, 2023*; 1:00 p.m., ESPN+		Princeton	W 74–70	8–2	21 – Reynolds II	6 – Greer III	3 – Tied	Hagan Arena (3,004); Philadelphia, PA
December 16, 2023*; 7:00 p.m., –		vs. Iona; Holiday Hoopfest	W 83–58	9–2	26 – Reynolds II	7 – Brown	4 – Reynolds II	UBS Arena (3,877); Elmont, NY
December 21, 2023*; 7:00 p.m., FloSports		at Charleston	L 82–89	9–3	21 – C. Brown	9 – Fleming	8 – Greer III	TD Arena (4,854); Charleston, SC
December 29, 2023*; 7:00 p.m., ESPN+		Loyola (MD)	W 97–56	10–3	19 – Fleming	9 – Fleming	6 – Tied	Hagan Arena (2,872); Philadelphia, PA
Atlantic 10 regular season
January 3, 2024; 7:00 p.m., ESPN+		at Rhode Island	L 74–78	10–4 (0–1)	21 – Greer III	12 – Fleming	3 – Greer III	Ryan Center (3,252); Kingston, RI
January 10, 2024; 7:00 p.m., CBSSN		at Saint Louis	L 85–88	10–5 (0–2)	27 – Reynolds II	8 – Essandoko	5 – Greer III	Chaifetz Arena (6,245); St. Louis, MO
January 13, 2024; 4:00 p.m., ESPNU		Loyola Chicago	L 75–78	10–6 (0–3)	26 – Reynolds II	9 – Greer III	4 – Reynolds II	Hagan Arena (2,142); Philadelphia, PA
January 15, 2024; 4:00 p.m., CBSSN		La Salle	W 82–62	11–6 (1–3)	19 – X. Brown	12 – Fleming	5 – Essandoko	Hagan Arena (2,796); Philadelphia, PA
January 20, 2024; 2:30 p.m., USA		Duquesne	W 71–69	12–6 (2–3)	21 – Essandoko	12 – Essandoko	5 – X. Brown	Hagan Arena (2,507); Philadelphia, PA
January 23, 2024; 7:00 p.m., ESPN+		at UMass	W 78–77	13–6 (3–3)	31 – Reynolds II	11 – Fleming	4 – Greer III	Mullins Center (3,210); Amherst, MA
January 26, 2024; 8:30 p.m., ESPN2		at St. Bonaventure	L 72–91	13–7 (3–4)	16 – C. Brown	7 – Essandoko	6 – X. Brown	Reilly Center (4,396); Olean, NY
January 31, 2024; 7:00 p.m., ESPN+		George Mason	W 75–73	14–7 (4–4)	16 – X. Brown	15 – Essandoko	4 – Tied	Hagan Arena (1,844); Philadelphia, PA
February 3, 2024; 12:00 p.m., ESPNU		at La Salle	W 88–82	15–7 (5–4)	21 – Reynolds	10 – Greer III	3 – Tied	Tom Gola Arena (3,174); Philadelphia, PA
February 6, 2024; 7:00 p.m., CBSSN		No. 18 Dayton	L 79–94	15–8 (5–5)	19 – C. Brown	6 – Tied	4 – Greer III	Hagan Arena (2,923); Philadelphia, PA
February 10, 2024; 12:30 p.m., USA		Saint Louis	W 87–86	16–8 (6–5)	27 – X. Brown	7 – C. Brown	7 – X. Brown	Hagan Arena (2,407); Philadelphia, PA
February 14, 2024; 8:00 p.m., ESPN+		at Loyola Chicago	L 59–64	16–9 (6–6)	29 – X. Brown	7 – X. Brown	4 – Finkley	Joseph J. Gentile Arena (2,794); Chicago, IL
February 17, 2024; 2:30 p.m., USA		at Duquesne	L 56–66	16–10 (6–7)	18 – C. Brown	12 – Fleming	3 – Tied	UPMC Cooper Fieldhouse (3,017); Pittsburgh, PA
February 21, 2024; 7:00 p.m., ESPN+		George Washington	W 79–75	17–10 (7–7)	20 – Reynolds II	6 – Greer III	6 – Reynolds II	Hagan Arena (1,707); Philadelphia, PA
February 25, 2024; 4:00 p.m., CBSSN		at VCU	L 69–73	17–11 (7–8)	21 – Tied	6 – Tied	3 – Tied	Siegel Center (7,637); Richmond, VA
March 2, 2024; 12:30 p.m., USA		Fordham	W 82–69	18–11 (8–8)	16 – Klaczek	6 – Klaczek	6 – Klaczek	Hagan Arena (2,676); Philadelphia, PA
March 6, 2024; 7:00 p.m., ESPN+		at Richmond	L 66–73	18–12 (8–9)	21 – Tied	9 – Fleming	3 – Klaczek	Robins Center (5,942); Richmond, VA
March 9, 2024; 1:00 p.m., ESPN+		Davidson	W 89–71	19–12 (9–9)	23 – Fleming	9 – Fleming	7 – X. Brown	Hagan Arena (2,257); Philadelphia, PA
A-10 tournament
March 13, 2024; 11:30 a.m., USA	(9)	vs. (8) George Mason; Second Round	W 64–57	20–12	16 – C. Brown	8 – Fleming	5 – Greer III	Barclays Center; Brooklyn, NY
March 14, 2024; 11:30 a.m., USA	(9)	vs. (1) Richmond; Quarterfinals	W 66–61	21–12	30 – Reynolds II	12 – Fleming	2 – Tied	Barclays Center; Brooklyn, NY
March 16, 2024; 1:00 p.m., CBSSN	(9)	vs. (5) VCU; Semifinals	L 60–66	21–13	18 – Reynolds II	12 – Fleming	6 – Greer III	Barclays Center; Brooklyn, NY
NIT
March 20, 2024; 7:00 p.m., ESPN2		at (1) Seton Hall; First Round - Seton Hall Bracket	L 72–75 ^{OT}	21–14	27 – Reynolds II	8 – Essandoko	10 – Brown	Walsh Gymnasium (1,233); South Orange, NJ
*Non-conference game. ^{#}Rankings from AP Poll. (#) Tournament seedings in parentheses. All times are in Eastern Time.
