= 2023–24 Rhode Island Rams men's basketball team =

American college basketball season

2023–24 Rhode Island Rams men's basketball
- Conference: Atlantic 10 Conference
- Record: 12–20 (6–12 A-10)
- Head coach: Archie Miller (2nd season)
- Assistant coaches: Austin Carroll; Christen Cunningham; Kenny Johnson
- Home arena: Ryan Center

2023–24 Atlantic 10 men's basketball standings
	Conf.				Overall
Team	W		L	PCT	W		L	PCT
Richmond	15	–	3	.833	23	–	10	.697
Loyola Chicago	15	–	3	.833	23	–	10	.697
No. 24 Dayton	14	–	4	.778	25	–	8	.758
UMass	11	–	7	.611	20	–	11	.645
VCU	11	–	7	.611	24	–	14	.632
Duquesne †	10	–	8	.556	25	–	12	.676
St. Bonaventure	9	–	9	.500	20	–	13	.606
George Mason	9	–	9	.500	20	–	12	.625
Saint Joseph's	9	–	9	.500	21	–	14	.600
La Salle	6	–	12	.333	16	–	17	.485
Rhode Island	6	–	12	.333	12	–	20	.375
Fordham	6	–	12	.333	13	–	20	.394
Davidson	5	–	13	.278	15	–	17	.469
Saint Louis	5	–	13	.278	13	–	20	.394
George Washington	4	–	14	.222	15	–	17	.469
† 2024 A-10 tournament winner Rankings from AP poll

The 2023–24 Rhode Island Rams basketball team represented the University of Rhode Island during the 2023–24 NCAA Division I men's basketball season. The Rams, led by second-year head coach Archie Miller, played their home games at the Ryan Center in Kingston, Rhode Island as members of the Atlantic 10 Conference (A-10).

== Previous season ==
The Rams finished the 2022–23 season 9–22, 5–13 in A-10 play, to finish in 14th place. They lost in the first round of the A-10 tournament to La Salle.

== Offseason ==
=== Departures ===
Name	Number	Pos.	Height	Weight	Year	Hometown	Reason for departure
Anthony Harris	0	G	6' 4"	195	RS Sophomore	Woodbridge, VA	Transferred to St. Thomas (FL)
Abdou Samb	1	F	6' 8"	210	Sophomore	Upper Marlboro, MD	Transferred to IUPUI
Brayon Freeman	2	G	6' 2"	180	Sophomore	Washington, D.C.	Transferred to Coastal Carolina
Sebastian Thomas	4	G	6' 1"	180	Sophomore	Providence, RI	Transferred to Albany
Jalen Carey	5	G	6' 3"	186	RS Junior	Harlem, NY	Transferred
Ishmael Leggett	10	G	6' 2"	180	RS Sophomore	Washington, D.C.	Transferred to Pittsburgh
Malik Martin	12	G	6' 6"	210	RS Senior	Staten Island, NY	Graduated
Alex Tchikou	22	F	6' 11"	230	RS Sophomore	Paris, France	Transferred to Detroit Mercy
Louis Hutchinson	24	G/F	6' 7"	185	Freshman	Upper Marlboro, MD	Transferred to Charleston Southern

=== Incoming transfers ===
Name	Number	Pos.	Height	Weight	Year	Hometown	Previous school
Zek Montgomery	0	G	6' 6"	210	Junior	Louisville, KY	Bradley
Luis Kortright	1	G	6' 3"	200	Junior	Manhattan, NY	Quinnipiac
Jaden House	2	G	6' 4"	201	Junior	Richmond, VA	High Point
Always Wright	5	G	6' 3"	175	Sophomore	Carthage, MO	Northeastern Oklahoma A&M
Tyson Brown	10	F	6' 9"	225	Junior	Virginia Beach, VA	Florida SouthWestern State
David Green	23	F	6' 7"	215	RS Junior	Apopka, FL	Louisiana Tech

=== Recruiting classes ===
==== 2023 recruiting class ====
College recruiting information
Name	Hometown	School	Height	Weight	Commit date
Connor Dubsky; SG	Woodbridge, VA	Sunrise Christian Academy	6 ft 4 in (1.93 m)	190 lb (86 kg)	Aug 12, 2022
Connor Dubsky; SG	Recruit ratings: Scout: Rivals: 247Sports: (NR)				
Cam Estevez; PG	New Milford, CT	Canterbury School	6 ft 4 in (1.93 m)	195 lb (88 kg)	Aug 24, 2023
Cam Estevez; PG	Recruit ratings: Scout: Rivals: 247Sports: (NR)				
David Fuchs; PF	Vienna, Austria	Ratiopharm Ulm	6 ft 8 in (2.03 m)	N/A	May 25, 2023
David Fuchs; PF	Recruit ratings: Scout: Rivals: 247Sports: (NR)				
Overall recruit ranking:
Note: In many cases, Scout, Rivals, 247Sports, On3, and ESPN may conflict in their listings of height and weight.; In these cases, the average was taken. ESPN grades are on a 100-point scale.; Sources: "2023 Team Ranking". Rivals.

==== 2024 recruiting class ====
College recruiting information (2024)
Name	Hometown	School	Height	Weight	Commit date
Ben Hammond #45 PG	Fairfax, VA	Paul VI High School	5 ft 8 in (1.73 m)	165 lb (75 kg)	Jun 27, 2023
Ben Hammond #45 PG	Recruit ratings: Scout: Rivals: 247Sports: ESPN: (80)				
Tyonne Farrell; SF	Baltimore, MD	Mount Saint Joseph College	6 ft 6 in (1.98 m)	N/A	Jun 30, 2022
Tyonne Farrell; SF	Recruit ratings: Scout: Rivals: (NR)				
Overall recruit ranking:
Note: In many cases, Scout, Rivals, 247Sports, On3, and ESPN may conflict in their listings of height and weight.; In these cases, the average was taken. ESPN grades are on a 100-point scale.; Sources: "2024 Team Ranking". Rivals.

== Roster ==
2023–24 Rhode Island Rams men's basketball team
Players
Coaches

Pos.	#	Name	Height	Weight	Year	Previous school	Hometown
G	0	Zek Montgomery	6 ft 6 in (1.98 m)	215 lb (98 kg)	Jr	St. Louis Christian Academy; Bradley	Louisville, KY
G	1	Luis Kortright	6 ft 3 in (1.91 m)	200 lb (91 kg)	Jr	St. Raymond; Quinnipiac	Manhattan, NY
G	2	Jaden House	6 ft 4 in (1.93 m)	201 lb (91 kg)	Jr	Middleburg Academy; High Point	Richmond, VA
G	4	Cam Estevez	6 ft 3 in (1.91 m)	180 lb (82 kg)	Fr	Canterbury School	Harlem, NY
G	5	Always Wright	6 ft 3 in (1.91 m)	175 lb (79 kg)	So	Joplin; Northeastern Oklahoma A&M	Carthage, MO
F	10	Tyson Brown	6 ft 9 in (2.06 m)	225 lb (102 kg)	Jr	Massanutten; Florida SouthWestern State	Virginia Beach, VA
C	11	Jeremy Foumena	6 ft 11 in (2.11 m)	235 lb (107 kg)	RS Fr	Orangeville Prep	Montreal, QC
G	14	Connor Dubsky	6 ft 4 in (1.93 m)	190 lb (86 kg)	Fr	Sunrise Christian Academy	Woodbridge, VA
F	15	Rory Stewart	6 ft 8 in (2.03 m)	230 lb (104 kg)	So	Orangeville Prep	Toronto, ON
G/F	20	Brandon Weston	6 ft 5 in (1.96 m)	200 lb (91 kg)	RS So	Hillcrest Prep Academy; Seton Hall	Brooklyn, NY
F	21	Josaphat Bilau	6 ft 10 in (2.08 m)	235 lb (107 kg)	RS Jr	Spire Academy; New Mexico JC	La Roche-sur-Yon, France
F	23	David Green	6 ft 7 in (2.01 m)	215 lb (98 kg)	RS Jr	Ocoee; Louisiana Tech	Apopka, FL
F	24	David Fuchs	6 ft 9 in (2.06 m)	225 lb (102 kg)	Fr	Ratiopharm Ulm (Germany)	Vienna, Austria
G	30	Jimmy Ball (W)	6 ft 2 in (1.88 m)	175 lb (79 kg)	So	Arlington Catholic	Medford, MA
G	34	Ray III Allen (W)	6 ft 1 in (1.85 m)	185 lb (84 kg)	Fr	Gulliver Prep	Miami, FL
G	35	Jameson Smith (W)	6 ft 1 in (1.85 m)	185 lb (84 kg)	Fr	Wilbraham & Munson	Falls Church, VA

Head coach

- Archie Miller (NC State)

Assistant coach(es)

- Austin Carroll (American)
- Christen Cunningham (Louisville)
- Kenny Johnson (Maryland)

Legend

- (C) Team captain
- (S) Suspended
- (I) Ineligible
- (W) Walk-on
- Injured
- Current redshirt

Roster
Last update: January 20, 2025

== Schedule and results ==
Date time, TV	Rank^{#}	Opponent^{#}	Result	Record	High points	High rebounds	High assists	Site (attendance) city, state
Exhibition
November 1, 2023*; 7:00 p.m.		Assumption	W 96–54		19 – House	11 – Fuchs	4 – Wright	Ryan Center (3,641); Kingston, RI
Non-conference regular season
November 6, 2023*; 7:00 p.m., ESPN+		Central Connecticut	W 81–70	1–0	25 – House	6 – Brown	9 – Wright	Ryan Center (4,118); Kingston, RI
November 9, 2023*; 7:00 p.m., ESPN+		Fairfield	W 93–80	2–0	22 – House	11 – Fuchs	4 – Fuchs	Ryan Center (4,155); Kingston, RI
November 14, 2023*; 7:00 p.m., ESPN+		Wagner	W 69–53	3–0	16 – Foumena	11 – Montgomery	6 – Montgomery	Ryan Center (3,795); Kingston, RI
November 18, 2023*; 12:00 p.m., ESPN+		vs. Northwestern; Hall of Fame Tip-Off semifinals	L 61–72	3–1	18 – Montgomery	7 – House	2 – Montgomery	Mohegan Sun Arena (5,112); Uncasville, CT
November 19, 2023*; 3:30 p.m., ESPNU		vs. Washington State; Hall of Fame Tip-Off 3rd-place game	L 57–78	3–2	19 – Montgomery	5 – tied	3 – Kortright	Mohegan Sun Arena (3,024); Uncasville, CT
November 22, 2023*; 2:00 p.m., ESPN+		Johnson & Wales	W 97–59	4–2	17 – Weston	13 – Fuchs	4 – Wright	Ryan Center (3,584); Kingston, RI
November 26, 2023*; 4:00 p.m., ESPN+		Yale	W 76–72	5–2	15 – Kortright	9 – Montgomery	4 – Kortright	Ryan Center (3,511); Kingston, RI
December 2, 2023*; 7:30 p.m., FS1		at Providence; Ocean State Rivalry	L 69–84	5–3	18 – House	9 – Bilau	4 – Kortright	Amica Mutual Pavilion (12,513); Providence, RI
December 6, 2023*; 7:00 p.m., ESPN+		Brown	L 64–67	5–4	16 – House	9 – Bilau	5 – Kortright	Ryan Center (4,475); Kingston, RI
December 10, 2023*; 2:00 p.m., FloSports		at College of Charleston	L 70–85	5–5	13 – Estevez	5 – tied	6 – Wright	TD Arena (4,974); Charleston, SC
December 16, 2023*; 4:30 p.m., FloSports		vs. Delaware; Holiday Hoopfest	L 56–67	5–6	17 – Estevez	7 – Brown	3 – tied	UBS Arena; Elmont, NY
December 21, 2023*; 6:00 p.m., ESPN+		New Hampshire	L 71–81	5–7	18 – Montgomery	10 – Foumena	3 – Estevez	Ryan Center (3,300); Kingston, RI
December 30, 2023*; 1:00 p.m., ESPN+		Northeastern	W 82–71	6–7	19 – House	12 – Fuchs	4 – Montgomery	Ryan Center (4,311); Kingston, RI
A-10 regular season
January 3, 2024; 7:00 p.m., ESPN+		Saint Joseph's	W 78–74	7–7 (1–0)	16 – Green	10 – Green	5 – Kortright	Ryan Center (3,252); Kingston, RI
January 9, 2024; 7:00 p.m., ESPN+		at Davidson	W 79–74	8–7 (2–0)	26 – Kortright	11 – Fuchs	5 – Kortright	John M. Belk Arena (2,511); Davidson, NC
January 13, 2024; 2:00 p.m., ESPN+		UMass	W 89–77	9–7 (3–0)	29 – House	6 – tied	5 – Kortright	Ryan Center (5,496); Kingston, RI
January 17, 2024; 7:00 p.m., ESPN+		at St. Bonaventure	L 64–99	9–8 (3–1)	13 – Kortright	8 – Green	5 – Kortright	Reilly Center (3,881); Olean, NY
January 20, 2024; 12:30 p.m., USA		at No. 21 Dayton	L 62–96	9–9 (3–2)	27 – House	7 – Brown	2 – tied	UD Arena (13,407); Dayton, OH
January 24, 2024; 7:00 p.m., ESPN+		Fordham	L 68–71	9–10 (3–3)	13 – Foumena	17 – Fuchs	9 – Kortright	Ryan Center (4,703); Kingston, RI
January 27, 2024; 4:00 p.m., ESPN+		at George Mason	L 84–92	9–11 (3–4)	29 – Green	6 – tied	4 – Kortright	EagleBank Arena (6,756); Fairfax, VA
January 31, 2024; 7:00 p.m., ESPN+		La Salle	W 71–69	10–11 (4–4)	20 – Green	6 – Weston	3 – Montgomery	Ryan Center (4,033); Kingston, RI
February 3, 2024; 12:30 p.m., USA		Duquesne	L 71–85	10–12 (4–5)	20 – Green	5 – Green	4 – Kortright	Ryan Center (5,822); Kingston, RI
February 6, 2024; 7:00 p.m., ESPN+		at George Washington	W 88–65	11–12 (5–5)	30 – Montgomery	12 – Kortright	5 – Kortright	Charles E. Smith Center (1,272); Washington, D.C.
February 11, 2024; 2:00 p.m., USA		at UMass	L 79–81	11–13 (5–6)	22 – House	7 – Kortright	5 – Weston	Mullins Center (3,553); Amherst, MA
February 18, 2024; 12:00 p.m., CBSSN		Loyola Chicago	L 67–77	11–14 (5–7)	15 – Weston	6 – Weston	3 – tied	Ryan Center (5,407); Kingston, RI
February 21, 2024; 7:00 p.m., ESPN+		Richmond	L 77–85	11–15 (5–8)	23 – Fuchs	12 – Fuchs	5 – Kortright	Ryan Center (4,252); Kingston, RI
February 25, 2024; 12:00 p.m., USA		at La Salle	L 61–84	11–16 (5–9)	12 – Weston	7 – Montgomery	2 – tied	Tom Gola Arena (1,642); Philadelphia, PA
February 28, 2024; 6:30 p.m., CBSSN		at VCU	L 67–88	11–17 (5–10)	16 – Green	7 – Brown	4 – Wright	Siegel Center (7,107); Richmond, VA
March 2, 2024; 4:00 p.m., CBSSN		Saint Louis	L 91–94	11–18 (5–11)	21 – Green	8 – tied	8 – Kortright	Ryan Center (4,671); Kingston, RI
March 6, 2024; 7:00 p.m., ESPN+		George Mason	L 51–69	11–19 (5–12)	16 – Green	5 – Green	3 – Kortright	Ryan Center (3,139); Kingston, RI
March 9, 2024; 1:00 p.m., ESPN+		at Fordham	W 58–50	12–19 (6–12)	12 – Brown	11 – Brown	5 – Kortright	Rose Hill Gymnasium (2,850); The Bronx, NY
A-10 tournament
March 12, 2024; 4:30 p.m., ESPN+	(11)	vs. (14) Saint Louis; First round	L 71–74	12–20	18 – House	6 – tied	5 – Kortright	Barclays Center (5,946); Brooklyn, NY
*Non-conference game. ^{#}Rankings from AP poll. (#) Tournament seedings in parentheses. All times are in Eastern.
