= 2023–24 Atlantic 10 Conference men's basketball season =

- League: NCAA Division I
- Sport: Basketball
- Teams: 15

Regular Season
- Regular Season Champions: Loyola Chicago, Richmond
- Season MVP: DaRon Holmes II, Dayton Jordan King, Richmond

Atlantic 10 Conference Tournament
- Champions: Duquesne
- Finals MVP: Dae Dae Grant, Duquesne

Seasons
- ← 2022–23 2024–25 →

2023–24 Atlantic 10 men's basketball standings
	Conf.				Overall
Team	W		L	PCT	W		L	PCT
Richmond	15	–	3	.833	23	–	10	.697
Loyola Chicago	15	–	3	.833	23	–	10	.697
No. 24 Dayton	14	–	4	.778	25	–	8	.758
UMass	11	–	7	.611	20	–	11	.645
VCU	11	–	7	.611	24	–	14	.632
Duquesne †	10	–	8	.556	25	–	12	.676
St. Bonaventure	9	–	9	.500	20	–	13	.606
George Mason	9	–	9	.500	20	–	12	.625
Saint Joseph's	9	–	9	.500	21	–	14	.600
La Salle	6	–	12	.333	16	–	17	.485
Rhode Island	6	–	12	.333	12	–	20	.375
Fordham	6	–	12	.333	13	–	20	.394
Davidson	5	–	13	.278	15	–	17	.469
Saint Louis	5	–	13	.278	13	–	20	.394
George Washington	4	–	14	.222	15	–	17	.469
† 2024 A-10 tournament winner Rankings from AP poll

The 2023–24 Atlantic 10 Conference men's basketball season was part of the 2023–24 NCAA Division I men's basketball season. The teams in the conference started non-conference play on November 6, 2023, and began conference play on January 3, 2024. The regular season ended March 8, 2024, followed by the 2024 Atlantic 10 men's basketball tournament from March 12 to March 17, 2024.

Richmond and Loyola Chicago shared the regular season championship, while Duquesne won the tournament. It was Richmond's first ever regular season title as members of the Atlantic 10 Conference, and their first overall regular season title since 2001. Duquesne won their second overall Atlantic 10 tournament, and it was their first since 1977.

Duquesne earned the conference's automatic bid into the 2024 NCAA Division I men's basketball tournament, while Dayton earned an at-large bid. Both teams reached the round of 32 before being eliminated. Richmond, Loyola Chicago, Saint Joseph's, and VCU earned at-large bids into the 2024 National Invitation Tournament. Richmond, Loyola Chicago, and Saint Joseph's were eliminated in the first round, while VCU reached the quarterfinals.

Dayton's DaRon Holmes II and Richmond's Jordan King were co-MVPs of the Atlantic 10 Conference.

== Previous season ==
The 2022–23 Atlantic 10 Conference men's basketball season coincided with the larger 2022–23 NCAA Division I men's basketball season. Atlantic 10 teams began non-conference play on November 7, 2022 and began conference play on December 31, 2022. The VCU Rams won both the Atlantic 10 regular season and the 2023 Atlantic 10 men's basketball tournament, beating the Dayton Flyers in both competitions. VCU point guard, Adrian Baldwin, was named the Atlantic 10 Conference Men's Basketball Player of the Year. Baldwin was joined by Dayton's Toumani Camara and DaRon Holmes II, Josh Oduro (George Mason), James Bishop IV (George Washington) and Yuri Collins (Saint Louis) for the Atlantic 10 Conference first-team.

Collins was named as an Associated Press All-American honorable mention.

== Head coaches ==
=== Coaching changes ===
Following the 2022–23 season, two coaches resigned. George Mason head coach, Kim English resigned to become the head coach at Providence. George Mason hired Maryland assistant coach, Tony Skinn to replace English. Skinn was part of Mason's Final Four run in 2006. VCU head coach, Mike Rhoades resigned to become the head coach at Penn State. VCU hired Utah State head coach, Ryan Odom the same day Rhoades resigned.

=== Coaches ===
Team	Head coach	Previous job	Years at school	Overall record	A10 record	A10 titles	A10 tournament titles	NCAA Tournaments	NCAA Final Fours	NCAA Championships
Davidson	Matt McKillop	Davidson (Asst.)	2	31–33 (.484)	13–23 (.361)	0	0	0	0	0
Dayton	Anthony Grant	Oklahoma City Thunder (Asst.)	6	148–71 (.676)	88–36 (.710)	1	0	1	0	0
Duquesne	Keith Dambrot	Akron	6	115–95 (.548)	56–65 (.463)	0	1	1	0	0
Fordham	Keith Urgo	Fordham (Assoc.)	2	38–28 (.576)	18–18 (.500)	0	0	0	0	0
George Mason	Tony Skinn	Maryland (Asst.)	1	20–12 (.625)	9–9 (.500)	0	0	0	0	0
George Washington	Chris Caputo	Miami (FL) (Assoc.)	2	31–33 (.484)	14–22 (.389)	0	0	0	0	0
La Salle	Fran Dunphy	Temple	2	31–36 (.463)	13–23 (.361)	0	0	0	0	0
Loyola Chicago	Drew Valentine	Loyola Chicago (Asst.)	3	33–30 (.524)	19–17 (.528)	1	0	0	0	0
Rhode Island	Archie Miller	Indiana	2	21–42 (.333)	11–25 (.306)	0	0	0	0	0
Richmond	Chris Mooney	Air Force	18	350–271 (.564)	176–141 (.555)	1	2	3	0	0
St. Bonaventure	Mark Schmidt	Robert Morris	16	302–226 (.572)	158–130 (.549)	2	2	3	0	0
Saint Joseph's	Billy Lange	Philadelphia 76ers (Asst.)	5	59–90 (.396)	27–57 (.321)	0	0	0	0	0
Saint Louis	Travis Ford	Oklahoma State	8	146–109 (.573)	72–64 (.529)	0	1	1	0	0
UMass	Frank Martin	South Carolina	2	35–27 (.565)	17–19 (.472)	0	0	0	0	0
VCU	Ryan Odom	Utah State	1	22–13 (.629)	11–7 (.611)	0	0	0	0	0

Notes:

- All records, appearances, titles, etc. are from time with current school only.
- Year at school includes 2023–24 season.
- Overall and Atlantic 10 records are from time at current school only and are through the beginning of the season.

== Preseason ==
=== Preseason men's basketball poll ===
First place votes in parentheses

1. Dayton (20) - 370
2. VCU (3) - 321
3. St. Bonaventure (1) - 319
4. Duquesne - 302
5. Saint Joseph's - 257
6. Saint Louis - 225
7. Fordham (1) - 215
8. Loyola Chicago - 177
9. George Washington - 173
10. George Mason -146
11. Richmond - 137
12. Davidson - 118
13. UMass - 93
14. Rhode Island -76
15. La Salle - 71

Source: Atlantic 10

=== Preseason Honors ===
Honor	Recipient	Postseason
Preseason All-Atlantic 10 First Team	DaRon Holmes II, Dayton	First Team, co-Atlantic 10 Player of the Year
Preseason All-Atlantic 10 First Team	Dae Dae Grant, Duquesne	Second Team
Preseason All-Atlantic 10 First Team	James Bishop IV, George Washington	Third Team
Preseason All-Atlantic 10 First Team	Daryl Banks III, St. Bonaventure	
Preseason All-Atlantic 10 First Team	Erik Reynolds II, St. Joseph's	First Team
Preseason All-Atlantic 10 First Team	Gibson Jimerson, St. Louis	Third Team
Preseason All-Atlantic 10 Second Team	Jimmie Clark III, Duquesne	Second Team
Preseason All-Atlantic 10 Second Team	Malachi Smith, Dayton	
Preseason All-Atlantic 10 Second Team	Maximus Edwards, George Washington	
Preseason All-Atlantic 10 Second Team	Khalil Brantly, La Salle	
Preseason All-Atlantic 10 Second Team	Phillp Alston, Loyola Chicago	Third Team
Preseason All-Atlantic 10 Second Team	Max Shulga, VCU	First Team
Preseason All-Atlantic 10 Third Team	Ronald Polite III, George Mason	
Preseason All-Atlantic 10 Third Team	Matt Cross, UMass	First Team
Preseason All-Atlantic 10 Third Team	Neal Quinn, Richmond	Second Team
Preseason All-Atlantic 10 Third Team	Chad Venning, St. Bonaventure	Second Team
Preseason All-Atlantic 10 Third Team	Cameron Brown, St. Joseph's	
Preseason All-Atlantic 10 Third Team	Sean Bairstow, VCU	

Source: Atlantic 10

== Regular season ==
=== Conference matrix ===
	Davidson	Dayton	Duquesne	Fordham	George Mason	George Washington	La Salle	Loyola Chicago	Rhode Island	Richmond	St. Bonaventure	Saint Joseph's	Saint Louis	UMass	VCU
vs. Davidson	—	2–0	0–1	0–2	1–0	1–0	0–1	2–0	1–0	2–0	1–0	1–0	0–1	1–0	1–0
vs. Dayton	0–2	—	0–2	0–1	1–0	0–1	0–1	1–0	0–1	1–0	0–1	0–1	0–2	0–1	1–1
vs. Duquesne	1–0	2–0	—	1–1	0–1	0–1	0–1	1–0	0–1	1–0	0–2	1–1	0–1	1–0	0–1
vs. Fordham	2–0	1–0	1–1	—	0–1	0–1	1–0	1–0	1–1	1–0	1–1	1–0	0–1	1–0	1–0
vs. George Mason	0–1	0–1	1–0	1–0	—	1–1	0–1	2–0	0–2	1–1	0–1	1–0	0–1	1–0	1–0
vs. George Washington	0–1	1–0	1–0	1–0	1–1	—	2–0	1–0	1–0	2–0	0–1	1–0	1–0	2–0	0–1
vs. La Salle	1–0	1–0	1–0	0–1	1–0	0–2	—	1–0	1–1	1–0	0–1	2–0	1–0	1–1	1–0
vs. Loyola Chicago	0–2	0–1	0–1	0–1	0–2	0–1	0–1	—	0–1	1–0	1–0	0–2	0–2	0–1	1–0
vs. Rhode Island	0–1	1–0	1–0	1–1	2–0	0–1	1–1	1–0	—	1–0	1–0	0–1	1–0	1–1	1–0
vs. Richmond	0–2	0–1	0–1	0–1	1–1	0–2	0–1	0–1	0–1	—	0–1	0–1	0–1	1–0	1–1
vs. St. Bonaventure	0–1	1–0	2–0	1–1	1–0	1–0	1–0	0–1	0–1	1–0	—	0–1	1–0	0–2	0–2
vs. Saint Joseph's	0–1	1–0	1–1	0–1	0–1	0–1	0–2	2–0	1–0	1–0	1–0	—	1–1	0–1	1–0
vs. Saint Louis	1–0	2–0	1–0	1–0	1–0	0–1	0–1	2–0	0–1	1–0	0–1	1–1	—	1–0	2–0
vs. UMass	0–1	1–0	0–1	0–1	0–1	0–2	1–1	1–0	1–1	0–1	2–0	1–0	0–1	—	0–1
vs. VCU	0–1	1–1	1–0	0–1	0–1	1–0	0–1	0–1	0–1	1–1	2–0	0–1	0–2	1–0	—
Total	5–13	14–4	10–8	6–12	9–9	4–14	6–12	15–3	6–12	15–3	9–9	9–9	5–13	11–7	11–7

=== Early season tournaments ===
	Tournament	Place/Finish
Davidson	Asheville Championship	2nd
Dayton	Charleston Classic	2nd
Duquesne	Cornhusker Classic	2nd
Fordham	Paradise Jam	4th
George Mason	Jacksonville Classic	3rd
George Washington	Nassau Championship	3rd
La Salle	Blue Devil Challenge	2nd
Loyola Chicago	Hall of Fame Classic	3rd
Rhode Island	Hall of Fame Tip-Off	4th
Richmond	Sunshine Slam	3rd
St. Bonaventure	Legends Classic	3rd
Saint Joseph's	Wildcat Challenge	3rd
Saint Louis	Myrtle Beach Invitational	4th
UMass	Diamond Head Classic	7th
VCU	ESPN Events Invitational	7th

== Rankings ==
=== National polls ===
		Pre	Wk 1	Wk 2	Wk 3	Wk 4	Wk 5	Wk 6	Wk 7	Wk 8	Wk 9	Wk 10	Wk 11	Wk 12	Wk 13	Wk 14	Wk 15	Wk 16	Wk 17	Wk 18	Wk 19	Final
Davidson	AP																					
Davidson	C																					
Dayton	AP												21	16	21	18	16	16	21	25	24	
Dayton	C																					
Duquesne	AP																					
Duquesne	C																					
Fordham	AP																					
Fordham	C																					
George Mason	AP																					
George Mason	C																					
George Washington	AP																					
George Washington	C																					
La Salle	AP																					
La Salle	C																					
Loyola Chicago	AP																					
Loyola Chicago	C																					
Rhode Island	AP																					
Rhode Island	C																					
Richmond	AP																					
Richmond	C																					
St. Bonaventure	AP																					
St. Bonaventure	C																					
Saint Joseph's	AP																					
Saint Joseph's	C																					
Saint Louis	AP																					
Saint Louis	C																					
UMass	AP																					
UMass	C																					
VCU	AP																					
VCU	C																					

=== Mid-major polls ===
Legend
Increase in ranking
Decrease in ranking
Not ranked previous week

SB Nation ranks teams that are not in the Power 6 Conferences, CollegeInsider.com does not consider the Atlantic 10 to be a mid-major conference in their poll.

	Wk 1	Wk 2	Wk 3	Wk 4	Wk 5	Wk 6	Wk 7	Wk 8	Wk 9	Wk 10	Wk 11	Wk 12	Wk 13	Wk 14	Wk 15	Wk 16	Wk 17	Wk 18	Final
Davidson		RV																	-
Dayton	8	12	9																-
Duquesne	16	7	15																-
Fordham																			-
George Mason			RV																-
George Washington																			-
La Salle																			-
Loyola Chicago	25	25	RV																-
Rhode Island																			-
Richmond		RV																	-
St. Bonaventure	15	RV																	-
Saint Joseph's		RV																	-
Saint Louis		21	RV																-
UMass																			-
VCU	13	RV	RV																-

== Record vs Other Conferences ==
The Atlantic 10 has a record of 146–74 in non-conference play. Updated March 18, 2024.

Power 6 Conferences
Conference	Record
ACC	1–3
Big East	2–1
Big Ten	2–3
Big 12	1–3
Pac–12	0–1
SEC	1–2
Combined	7–13

Other Conferences
Conference	Record
America East	3–1
American	3–5
ASUN	2–0
Big Sky	0–0
Big South	2–0
Big West	0–0
CAA	8–0
Conference USA	0–0
Horizon	2–0
Independents/Non-Division I	4–0
Ivy	4–3
MAAC	4–1
MAC	2–1
MEAC	2–0
Missouri Valley	1–2
Mountain West	2–2
Northeast	8–0
OVC	4–0
Patriot	4–0
Southern	2–1
Southland	1–2
SWAC	0–0
Summit	1–0
Sun Belt	0–0
West Coast	0–1
WAC	1–1
Combined	60–20

== Postseason ==
=== Atlantic 10 tournament ===
First round Tuesday, March 12; ESPN+
12	Fordham	71*
13	Davidson	63
10	La Salle	61
15	George Washington	60
11	Rhode Island	71
14	Saint Louis	74

Second round Wednesday, March 13; USA Network
8	George Mason	57
9	Saint Joseph's	64
5	VCU	69
12	Fordham	62
7	St. Bonaventure	75
10	La Salle	73
6	Duquesne	83
14	Saint Louis	73

Quarterfinals; Thursday, March 14; USA Network
1	Richmond	61
9	Saint Joseph's	66
4	UMass	59
5	VCU	73
2	Loyola Chicago	74
7	St. Bonaventure	75**
3	Dayton	57
6	Duquesne	65

Semifinals; Saturday, March 16; CBSSN
9	Saint Joseph's	60
5	VCU	66
7	St. Bonaventure	60
6	Duquesne	70

Championship; Sunday, March 17; CBS
5	VCU	51
6	Duquesne	57

* denotes overtime period

=== NCAA Tournament ===
Seed	Region	School	First Four	First round	Second round	Sweet 16	Elite Eight	Final Four	Championship
7	West	Dayton	Bye	Defeated (10) Nevada 63–60 (Salt Lake City)	Lost to (2) Arizona 68–78 (Salt Lake City)	DNP			
11	East	Duquesne	Bye	Defeated (6) BYU 71–67 (Omaha)	Lost to (3) Illinois 63–89 (Omaha)	DNP			
		W-L (%):		2–0 (1.000)	0–2 (.000)	0–0 (–)	0–0 (–)	0–0 (–)	TOTAL: 2–2 (.500)

=== NIT ===
Seed	Bracket	School	First round	Second round	Quarterfinals	Semifinals	Final
—	Wake Forest	Richmond	Lost to (3) Virginia Tech 58–74	DNP			
—	Seton Hall	Saint Joseph's	Lost to (1) Seton Hall 72–75^{OT}	DNP			
—	Indiana State	Loyola Chicago	Lost to (3) Bradley 62–74	DNP			
—	Villanova	VCU	Defeated (1) Villanova 70–61	Defeated South Florida, 70–65	vs. (2) Utah		
		W-L (%):	1–3 (.250)	1–0 (1.000)	0–0 (–)	0–0 (–)	TOTAL: 2–3 (.400)
