= 2023–24 Dayton Flyers men's basketball team =

American college basketball season

2023–24 Dayton Flyers men's basketball

NCAA tournament, Second Round
- Conference: Atlantic 10 Conference

Ranking
- AP: No. 24
- Record: 25–8 (14–4 A–10)
- Head coach: Anthony Grant (7th season)
- Associate head coach: Ricardo Greer (7th season)
- Assistant coaches: Darren Hertz (5th season); James Kane (4th season); Jermaine Henderson (1st season); Sean Damaska (1st season)
- Home arena: UD Arena

2023–24 Atlantic 10 men's basketball standings
	Conf.				Overall
Team	W		L	PCT	W		L	PCT
Richmond	15	–	3	.833	23	–	10	.697
Loyola Chicago	15	–	3	.833	23	–	10	.697
No. 24 Dayton	14	–	4	.778	25	–	8	.758
UMass	11	–	7	.611	20	–	11	.645
VCU	11	–	7	.611	24	–	14	.632
Duquesne †	10	–	8	.556	25	–	12	.676
St. Bonaventure	9	–	9	.500	20	–	13	.606
George Mason	9	–	9	.500	20	–	12	.625
Saint Joseph's	9	–	9	.500	21	–	14	.600
La Salle	6	–	12	.333	16	–	17	.485
Rhode Island	6	–	12	.333	12	–	20	.375
Fordham	6	–	12	.333	13	–	20	.394
Davidson	5	–	13	.278	15	–	17	.469
Saint Louis	5	–	13	.278	13	–	20	.394
George Washington	4	–	14	.222	15	–	17	.469
† 2024 A-10 tournament winner Rankings from AP poll

The 2023–24 Dayton Flyers men's basketball team represented the University of Dayton in the 2023–24 NCAA Division I men's basketball season. They were led by head coach, Anthony Grant, in his seventh season with the Flyers. The Flyers played their home games at UD Arena in Dayton, Ohio as members of the Atlantic 10 Conference (A-10). The Dayton Flyers men's basketball team drew an average home attendance of 13,407 in 15 games in 2023–24, the 20th highest in college basketball.

== Previous season ==
The Flyers finished the 2022–23 season 20–11, 12–6 in A-10 play, to finish a three-way tie for second place. They defeated Saint Joseph's in the quarterfinals and Fordham in the semifinals, before losing to VCU in the championship game of the A-10 tournament. They received an at-large bid to the NIT, but declined to participate.

== Offseason ==
=== Departures ===
Name	Number	Pos.	Height	Weight	Year	Hometown	Reason for departure
Tyrone Baker	0	C	6'9"	205	Sophomore	Fort Myers, FL	Transferred to Florida SouthWestern State College
Toumani Camara	2	F	6'8"	220	Junior	Brussels, Belgium	Declared for 2023 NBA draft; selected 52nd overall by Phoenix Suns
Kaleb Washington	10	F	6'7"	190	Sophomore	Mableton, GA	Transferred mid-season
Richard Amaefule	21	F	6'9"	224	RS Sophomore	London, England	Transferred
Mustapha Amzil	22	F	6'10"	224	Junior	Helsinki, Finland	Transferred to New Mexico
R. J. Blakney	23	G/F	6'6"	195	RS Sophomore	Baltimore, MD	Transferred to Old Dominion
Ty Locklear	50	G	6'1"	180	Freshman	Oberlin, OH	Walk-on; no longer on team roster
Cole Hatkevich	52	G	5'9"	165	Freshman	Granger, IN	Walk-on; no longer on team roster
Mike Sharavjamts	55	G/F	6'8"	180	Freshman	Ulaanbaatar, Mongolia	Transferred to San Francisco

=== Incoming transfers ===
Name	Number	Pos.	Height	Weight	Year	Hometown	Previous school
Javon Bennett	0	G	5'11"		Sophomore	Orlando, FL	Merrimack
Nate Santos	2	F	6'7"	215	Junior	Geneva, IL	Pittsburgh
Enoch Cheeks	6	G	6'3"	190	Junior	Providence, RI	Robert Morris
Isaac Jack	13	C	6'11"	251	Freshman	Port Alberni, BC	Buffalo
C.J. Napier	22	F	6'6"	225	GS Senior	Miamisburg, OH	Ohio Northern

=== 2023 recruiting class ===
College recruiting information
Name	Hometown	School	Height	Weight	Commit date
Marvel Allen #26 SG	Fort Lauderdale, FL	Montverde Academy	6 ft 3 in (1.91 m)	175 lb (79 kg)	May 8, 2023
Marvel Allen #26 SG	Recruit ratings: Rivals: 247Sports: ESPN: (82)				
Jaiun Simon; SF	Mableton, GA	Pebblebrook High School	6 ft 6 in (1.98 m)	190 lb (86 kg)	Oct 27, 2022
Jaiun Simon; SF	Recruit ratings: Rivals: 247Sports: ESPN: (NR)				
Petras Padegimas; SF	Kaunas, Lithuania	DME Academy	6 ft 8 in (2.03 m)	215 lb (98 kg)	Jul 2, 2023
Petras Padegimas; SF	Recruit ratings: Rivals: 247Sports: ESPN: (NR)				
Overall recruit ranking:
Note: In many cases, Scout, Rivals, 247Sports, On3, and ESPN may conflict in their listings of height and weight.; In these cases, the average was taken. ESPN grades are on a 100-point scale.; Sources: "Dayton 2023 Basketball Commitments". Rivals.; "Dayton Flyers 2023 Player Commits". ESPN.; "2023 Team Ranking". Rivals.

== Roster ==
2023–24 Dayton Flyers men's basketball team
Players
Coaches

Pos.	#	Name	Height	Weight	Year	Previous school	Hometown
G	0	Javon Bennett	5 ft 10 in (1.78 m)	155 lb (70 kg)	So	Merrimack	Orlando, FL
F	2	Nate Santos	6 ft 7 in (2.01 m)	210 lb (95 kg)	Jr	Pittsburgh	Geneva, IL
F	3	Jaiun Simon	6 ft 6 in (1.98 m)	220 lb (100 kg)	Fr	Pebblebrook High School	Mableton, GA
G	4	Koby Brea	6 ft 6 in (1.98 m)	205 lb (93 kg)	Jr	Monsignor Scanlan High School	Washington Heights, NY
G	6	Enoch Cheeks	6 ft 3 in (1.91 m)	195 lb (88 kg)	Jr	Robert Morris	Providence, RI
G	7	Evan Dickey (W)	6 ft 3 in (1.91 m)	180 lb (82 kg)	Fr	Chaminade Julienne High School	Dayton, OH
G	8	Marvel Allen	6 ft 4 in (1.93 m)	200 lb (91 kg)	Fr	Montverde Academy	Fort Lauderdale, FL
G	11	Malachi Smith (injured)	6 ft 0 in (1.83 m)	180 lb (82 kg)	Jr	St. Raymond High School for Boys	The Bronx, NY
F	12	Petras Padegimas	6 ft 8 in (2.03 m)	215 lb (98 kg)	Fr	DME Academy	Kaunas, Lithuania
F	13	Isaac Jack	6 ft 11 in (2.11 m)	250 lb (113 kg)	So	Buffalo	Port Alberni, BC
F	15	DaRon Holmes II	6 ft 10 in (2.08 m)	235 lb (107 kg)	Jr	AZ Compass Prep	Goodyear, AZ
G	21	Brady Uhl	6 ft 2 in (1.88 m)	200 lb (91 kg)	Jr	Cumberlands	Dayton, OH
F	22	CJ Napier (W)	6 ft 6 in (1.98 m)	215 lb (98 kg)	GS	Ohio Northern	Miamisburg, OH
G	24	Kobe Elvis	6 ft 2 in (1.88 m)	180 lb (82 kg)	Jr	DePaul	Brampton, ON
G	25	Will Maxwell (W)	6 ft 4 in (1.93 m)	200 lb (91 kg)	Fr	Oakwood High School	Oakwood, OH
G	33	Makai Grant (W)	6 ft 1 in (1.85 m)	190 lb (86 kg)	Fr	Chaminade Julienne High School	Dayton, OH
F	45	Zimi Nwokeji	6 ft 7 in (2.01 m)	215 lb (98 kg)	RS Jr	SPIRE Academy	Quincy, FL
G/F	54	Atticus Schuler (W)	6 ft 6 in (1.98 m)	200 lb (91 kg)	So	St. Francis DeSales High School	Westerville, OH

Head coach

- Anthony Grant (Dayton)

Assistant coach(es)

- Ricardo Greer (Pittsburgh)
- Darren Hertz (Florida)
- James Kane (Florida)
- Jermaine Henderson (Miami (OH))
- Sean Damaska (Northern Illinois)

Legend

- (C) Team captain
- (S) Suspended
- (I) Ineligible
- (W) Walk-on
- Injured
- Current redshirt

Roster
Last update: December 10, 2023

== Schedule and results ==
Date time, TV	Rank^{#}	Opponent^{#}	Result	Record	High points	High rebounds	High assists	Site (attendance) city, state
Exhibition
October 22, 2023*; 6:00 p.m., BSOH		Ohio State	L 70–78	–	17 – Cheeks	7 – Santos	4 – Smith	UD Arena (13,407); Dayton, OH
October 28, 2023*; 2:00 p.m., –		Cedarville	W 75–40	–	18 – Holmes II	12 – Holmes II	3 – Tied	UD Arena (13,407); Dayton, OH
Non-conference regular season
November 6, 2023*; 7:00 p.m., SPEC1/ESPN+		SIU Edwardsville	W 63–47	1–0	19 – Holmes II	14 – Santos	6 – Bennett	UD Arena (13,407); Dayton, OH
November 10, 2023*; 8:30 p.m., BTN		at Northwestern	L 66–71	1–1	17 – Holmes II	7 – Holmes II	6 – Holmes II	Welsh–Ryan Arena (5,769); Evanston, IL
November 16, 2023*; 4:00 p.m., ESPN2		vs. LSU; Charleston Classic quarterfinals	W 70–67	2–1	19 – Santos	10 – Cheeks	5 – Elvis	TD Arena (3,879); Charleston, SC
November 17, 2023*; 2:00 p.m., ESPN2		vs. St. John's; Charleston Classic semifinals	W 88–81	3–1	21 – Holmes II	6 – Brea	5 – Elvis	TD Arena (3,927); Charleston, SC
November 19, 2023*; 8:30 p.m., ESPN		vs. No. 6 Houston; Charleston Classic championship	L 55–69	3–2	16 – Holmes II	5 – Tied	9 – Elvis	TD Arena (3,841); Charleston, SC
November 24, 2023*; 7:00 p.m., BSOH/ESPN+		Youngstown State	W 77–69	4–2	18 – Holmes II	13 – Santos	4 – Tied	UD Arena (13,407); Dayton, OH
November 29, 2023*; 8:00 p.m., ESPN+		at SMU	W 65–63	5–2	22 – Brea	7 – Tied	6 – Holmes II	Moody Coliseum (4,908); Dallas, TX
December 2, 2023*; 2:00 p.m., BSOH/ESPN+		Grambling State	W 76–46	6–2	26 – Santos	6 – Holmes II	8 – Bennett	UD Arena (13,407); Dayton, OH
December 6, 2023*; 9:00 p.m., CBSSN		UNLV	Canceled due to the 2023 UNLV shooting					UD Arena (–); Dayton, OH
December 9, 2023*; 12:30 p.m., USA		Troy	W 82–70	7–2	24 – Elvis	17 – Holmes II	4 – Holmes II	UD Arena (13,407); Dayton, OH
December 16, 2023*; 7:00 p.m., ESPN+		vs. Cincinnati; Hoops Classic	W 82–68	8–2	28 – Holmes II	8 – Santos	3 – Elvis	Heritage Bank Center (12,547); Cincinnati, OH
December 20, 2023*; 7:00 p.m., SPEC1/ESPN+		Oakland	W 91–67	9–2	19 – Bennett	8 – Holmes II	9 – Bennett	UD Arena (13,407); Dayton, OH
December 30, 2023*; 2:00 p.m., SPEC1/ESPN+		Longwood	W 78–69	10–2	27 – Holmes II	10 – Holmes II	4 – Tied	UD Arena (13,407); Dayton, OH
Atlantic 10 regular season
January 3, 2024; 7:00 p.m., CBSSN		at Davidson	W 72–59	11–2 (1–0)	18 – Holmes II	10 – Cheeks	6 – Bennett	John M. Belk Arena (3,244); Davidson, NC
January 7, 2024; 1:00 p.m., ESPN2		UMass	W 64–60	12–2 (2–0)	18 – Holmes II	7 – Brea	4 – Holmes II	UD Arena (13,407); Dayton, OH
January 12, 2024; 7:00 p.m., ESPN2		at Duquesne	W 72–62	13–2 (3–0)	33 – Holmes II	12 – Holmes II	6 – Bennett	UPMC Cooper Fieldhouse (3,724); Pittsburgh, PA
January 16, 2024; 8:00 p.m., CBSSN	No. 21	Saint Louis	W 70–65	14–2 (4–0)	29 – Holmes II	14 – Holmes II	3 – Elvis	UD Arena (13,407); Dayton, OH
January 20, 2024; 12:30 p.m., USA	No. 21	Rhode Island	W 96–62	15–2 (5–0)	22 – Bennett	6 – Holmes II	6 – Elvis	UD Arena (13,407); Dayton, OH
January 23, 2024; 6:30 p.m., ESPN+	No. 16	at La Salle	W 66–54	16–2 (6–0)	22 – Holmes II	8 – Holmes II	4 – Tied	Tom Gola Arena (1,571); Philadelphia, PA
January 27, 2024; 6:00 p.m., CBSSN	No. 16	at Richmond	L 64–69	16–3 (6–1)	18 – Bennett	12 – Cheeks	4 – Elvis	Robins Center (7,201); Richmond, VA
January 30, 2024; 7:00 p.m., SPEC1/ESPN+	No. 21	George Washington	W 83–61	17–3 (7–1)	25 – Holmes II	12 – Holmes II	4 – Tied	UD Arena (13,407); Dayton, OH
February 2, 2024; 7:00 p.m., ESPN2	No. 21	St. Bonaventure	W 76–71	18–3 (8–1)	34 – Holmes	7 – Tied	4 – Bennett	UD Arena (13,407); Dayton, OH
February 6, 2024; 8:00 p.m., CBSSN	No. 18	at Saint Joseph's	W 94–79	19–3 (9–1)	21 – Tied	7 – Tied	10 – Elvis	Hagan Arena (2,923); Philadelphia, PA
February 9, 2024; 7:00 p.m., ESPN2	No. 18	at VCU	L 47–49	19–4 (9–2)	19 – Santos	11 – Holmes II	4 – Bennett	Siegel Center (7,637); Richmond, VA
February 13, 2024; 7:00 p.m., SPEC1/ESPN+	No. 16	Duquesne	W 75–59	20–4 (10–2)	24 – Holmes II	11 – Holmes II	4 – Bennett	UD Arena (13,407); Dayton, OH
February 17, 2024; 1:30 p.m., CBSSN	No. 16	Fordham	W 78–70	21–4 (11–2)	29 – Holmes II	10 – Holmes II	3 – Tied	UD Arena (13,407); Dayton, OH
February 21, 2024; 7:00 p.m., ESPN+	No. 16	at George Mason	L 67–71	21–5 (11–3)	26 – Holmes II	7 – Holmes II	5 – Bennett	EagleBank Arena (5,286); Fairfax, VA
February 27, 2024; 7:00 p.m., CBSSN	No. 21	Davidson	W 80–66	22–5 (12–3)	15 – Cheeks	10 – Holmes II	5 – Elvis	UD Arena (13,407); Dayton, OH
March 1, 2024; 9:00 p.m., ESPN2	No. 21	at Loyola Chicago	L 72–77	22–6 (12–4)	20 – Holmes II	9 – Holmes II	5 – Elvis	Joseph J. Gentile Arena (4,557); Chicago, IL
March 5, 2024; 9:00 p.m., CBSSN	No. 25	at Saint Louis	W 100–83	23–6 (13–4)	25 – Holmes II	13 – Holmes II	5 – Tied	Chaifetz Arena (6,358); St. Louis, MO
March 8, 2024; 7:00 p.m., ESPN2	No. 25	VCU	W 91–86 ^{OT}	24–6 (14–4)	23 – Holmes II	10 – Holmes II	6 – Tied	UD Arena (13,407); Dayton, OH
A-10 tournament
March 14, 2024; 7:30 p.m, USA	(3) No. 24	vs. (6) Duquesne; Quarterfinals	L 57–65	24–7	24 – Holmes II	13 – Holmes II	3 – Holmes II	Barclays Center (6,327); Brooklyn, NY
NCAA tournament
March 21, 2024*; 4:30 p.m, TBS	(7 W)	vs. (10 W) Nevada; First Round	W 63–60	25–7	15 – Holmes II	9 – Holmes II	5 – Elvis	Delta Center; Salt Lake City, UT
March 23, 2024*; 12:45 p.m., CBS	(7 W)	vs. (2 W) No. 9 Arizona; Second Round	L 68–78	25–8	23 – Holmes II	11 – Holmes II	3 – Holmes II	Delta Center; Salt Lake City, UT
*Non-conference game. ^{#}Rankings from AP poll. (#) Tournament seedings in parentheses. All times are in Eastern Time.

== Rankings ==
Ranking movements Legend: ██ Increase in ranking ██ Decrease in ranking — = Not ranked RV = Received votes
	Week																				
Poll	Pre	1	2	3	4	5	6	7	8	9	10	11	12	13	14	15	16	17	18	19	Final
AP	—	—	—	—	—	RV	RV	RV	RV	RV	21	16	21	18	16	16	21	25	24	RV	24
Coaches	—	—	—	—	—	—	RV	—	—	RV	23	17	19	17	18	16	20	RV	24	RV	RV
