= Al-Amir Dawes =

American basketball player (born 2001)

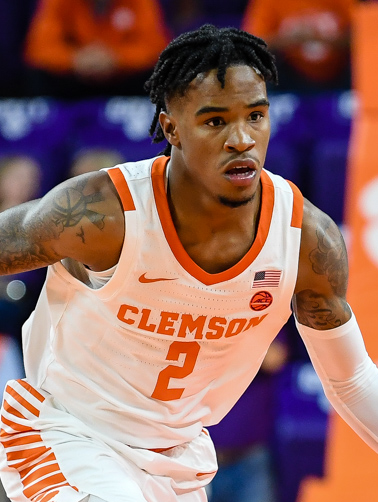

No. 2 – BK Děčín
- Position: Point guard
- League: National Basketball League

Personal information
- Born: September 28, 2001 (age 25)
- Listed height: 6 ft 2 in (1.88 m)
- Listed weight: 180 lb (82 kg)

Career information
- High school: The Patrick School (Hillside, New Jersey)
- College: Clemson (2019–2022); Seton Hall (2022–2024)
- NBA draft: 2024: undrafted
- Playing career: 2024–present

Career history
- 2024–2025: APOEL B.C.
- 2025–2026: Saint-Chamond
- 2026–present: BK Děčín

Career highlights
- NIT champion (2024); NIT MVP (2024)
Medals
Men's basketball
Representing United States
Summer Universiade
Gold medal – first place	2019 Italy	Team

Al-Amir Maurice Dawes (born September 28, 2001) is an American professional basketball player for BK Děčín of the Czech National Basketball League. He played college basketball player for the Seton Hall Pirates and the Clemson Tigers.

== High school career ==
Dawes grew up in Newark, New Jersey and began playing basketball at the age of three. He attended The Patrick School, where he played behind Bryce Aiken as a freshman. Dawes averaged 6.7 points per game as a sophomore, on a team that finished 28–4 and won the New Jersey Tournament of Champions. As a junior, he averaged 11.8 points per game, helping The Patrick School reach the Union County Tournament final. Dawes averaged 15.5 points, 4.3 assists, 3.1 rebounds and 2.1 steals per game in Nike EYBL play. He was considered to be a four-star recruit and the fifth-best prospect in New Jersey. Dawes committed to Clemson over offers from Rutgers, Providence, Seton Hall, St. John's and UConn.

== College career ==
Dawes became the first freshman to be a regular starter at Clemson since Demontez Stitt in the 2007–08 season. He struggled with his turnovers early in the season and scored in double figures six times in Clemson's first 21 games. On February 22, 2020, Dawes scored a career-high 22 points in an 82–64 win against Boston College. He scored 18 points against Florida State on February 29, hitting the game-winning layup with a second remaining. As a freshman, Dawes averaged 9 points, 2.8 rebounds and 2.5 assists per game. He scored a sophomore season-high 21 points on March 6, 2021, in a 77–62 win against Pittsburgh. Dawes averaged 9 points per game as a sophomore, shooting 39.4 percent from three-point range. As a junior, he averaged 11.3 points and 2.3 assists per game. Following the season, Dawes transferred to Seton Hall.

As a senior, Dawes averaged 12.6 points, 2.6 rebounds, 1.7 assists and 1.1 steals per game while shooting 38.2 percent from three-point range. He returned for his fifth season of eligibility. Dawes helped Seton Hall win the 2024 NIT and was named MVP after scoring 24 points in the title game against Indiana State. He averaged 15.0 points, 2.8 rebounds, and 2.3 assists per game.

== Professional career ==
Dawes began his professional career with APOEL B.C. of the Cypriot league, signing with the team on September 3, 2024. He averaged 20.3 points, 3.5 rebounds and 4.2 assists per game. In 2025, Dawes joined Saint-Chamond of the French LNB Pro B and averaged 10 points per game in 12 games. On March 26, 2026, he signed with BK Děčín of the Czech National Basketball League.

== National team career ==
Dawes was a part of the Clemson team chosen to represent the United States in the 2019 Summer Universiade in Italy. The U.S. received a gold medal after defeating Ukraine in the title game, and Dawes averaged 7 points per game during the tournament. In the 75–73 semifinal win against Israel, Dawes posted 16 points.

== Career statistics ==
Legend
GP	Games played	GS	Games started	MPG	Minutes per game
FG%	Field goal percentage	3P%	3-point field goal percentage	FT%	Free throw percentage
RPG	Rebounds per game	APG	Assists per game	SPG	Steals per game
BPG	Blocks per game	PPG	Points per game	**Bold**	Career high

=== College ===
Year	Team	GP	GS	MPG	FG%	3P%	FT%	RPG	APG	SPG	BPG	PPG
2019–20	Clemson	31	26	**29.8**	.381	.318	.789	**2.8**	**2.5**	1.0	.0	9.0
2020–21	Clemson	24	15	25.5	**.421**	.394	.742	2.0	1.9	.9	**.2**	9.0
2021–22	Clemson	**33**	25	29.7	.405	**.398**	**.847**	**2.8**	2.3	.9	.0	11.3
2022–23	Seton Hall	**33**	**29**	31.5	.391	.382	.827	2.6	1.7	**1.1**	.1	**12.6**
Career		121	95	29.4	.398	.375	.811	2.6	2.1	1	.1	10.6
