= 2024 National Invitation Tournament =

Men's college basketball tournament

- Season: 2023–24
- Teams: 32
- Finals site: Hinkle Fieldhouse, Indianapolis, Indiana
- Champions: Seton Hall Pirates (2nd title)
- Runner-up: Indiana State Sycamores (1st title game)
- Semifinalists: Georgia Bulldogs (3rd semifinal); Utah Utes (5th semifinal)
- Winning coach: Shaheen Holloway (1st title)
- MVP: Al-Amir Dawes (Seton Hall)

The 2024 National Invitation Tournament was a single-elimination tournament of 32 NCAA Division I men's college basketball teams not selected to participate in the 2024 NCAA tournament. The tournament began on March 19 and ended on April 4. The first three rounds were played on campuses, with the semifinal and championship final played at Hinkle Fieldhouse in Indianapolis, Indiana.

== Participants ==
Teams and pairings for the 2024 NIT were released by the NIT Committee on Sunday, March 17, 2024. 32 teams qualified for the NIT, including both automatic qualifiers and at-large selections. In 2023, the North Texas Mean Green won the NIT championship.

=== Automatic qualifiers ===
In a change from previous tournaments, teams which had the best regular-season record in their conference but failed to win their conference tournament no longer automatically qualified for the NIT. Instead, the top two teams (based on NET ranking) from six major conferences (ACC, Big East, Big Ten, Big 12, Pac-12 and SEC) not selected for the NCAA tournament received automatic bids, regardless of their win-loss records. These 12 teams also were given the opportunity to host first-round games. If a team declined an automatic bid, it was offered to the team with the next best NET ranking in the declining team's conference. Despite this new automatic qualification criterion, only one automatic qualifier from the Pac-12 accepted a 2024 NIT bid, meaning only 11 automatic bids were awarded.

Team	Conference	Overall record	Appearance	Last bid
Wake Forest	ACC	20–13	7th	2022
Virginia Tech	ACC	18–14	15th	2023
Villanova	Big East	18–15	19th	2023
Providence	Big East	21–13	21st	2019
Ohio State	Big Ten	20–13	10th	2016
Iowa	Big Ten	18–14	9th	2017
Cincinnati	Big 12	20–14	12th	2023
UCF	Big 12	17–15	4th	2023
Utah	Pac-12	19–14	15th	2018
LSU	SEC	17–15	9th	2018
Georgia	SEC	17–16	15th	2017

The NET rankings through games of March 17, 2024, of non-NCAA tournament teams from automatically qualifying conferences are listed below. Teams in bold accepted a bid, teams in italics were eligible for an automatic bid, but declined.

Team	NET Rank
Atlantic Coast Conference
Pittsburgh	40
**Wake Forest**	43
**Virginia Tech**	60
Boston College	81
Syracuse	84
Florida State	96
Miami (FL)	101
Notre Dame	124
Georgia Tech	127
Louisville	216
Big East Conference
St. John's	32
**Villanova**	41
**Providence**	58
Xavier	64
Seton Hall	67
Butler	68
Georgetown	205
DePaul	320

Team	NET Rank
Big Ten Conference
**Ohio State**	49
**Iowa**	62
Maryland	82
Penn State	86
Minnesota	89
Indiana	98
Rutgers	103
Michigan	133
Big 12 Conference
**Cincinnati**	37
Oklahoma	46
**UCF**	61
Kansas State	70
Oklahoma State	123
West Virginia	156

Team	NET Rank
Pac-12 Conference
**Utah**	48
Washington	69
USC	88
UCLA	107
Stanford	113
California	128
Arizona State	134
Oregon State	165
Southeastern Conference
Ole Miss	90
**LSU**	94
**Georgia**	100
Arkansas	115
Missouri	158
Vanderbilt	202

=== At-large bids ===
The following teams were awarded at-large bids.

Team	Conference	Overall record	Appearance	Last bid
Appalachian State	Sun Belt	27–6	2nd	2007
Boston College	ACC	19–15	13th	2018
Bradley	Missouri Valley	22–11	23rd	2023
Butler	Big East	18–14	10th	2019
Cornell	Ivy League	22–7	1st	Never
Indiana State†	Missouri Valley	28–6	5th	2014
Kansas State	Big 12	19–14	8th	2009
Loyola Chicago	Atlantic 10	23–9	6th	2019
Minnesota	Big Ten	18–14	16th	2014
North Texas	American	18–14	3rd	2023
Princeton	Ivy League	24–4	8th	2022
Richmond	Atlantic 10	23–9	11th	2021
Saint Joseph's	Atlantic 10	21–13	17th	2013
San Francisco	West Coast	23–10	7th	2014
Seton Hall‡	Big East	20–12	19th	2023
SMU	American	20–12	6th	2022
South Florida	American	24–7	9th	2010
UC Irvine	Big West	24–9	8th	2023
UNLV	Mountain West	19–12	11th	2009
VCU	Atlantic 10	22–13	7th	2022
Xavier	Big East	16–17	10th	2022

† Team was one of the first four out of the NCAA tournament and entitled to deference from the NIT Committee in determining home-court advantage for first-round games.
‡ Team was one of the first four out of the NCAA tournament and went on to win the 2024 NIT championship.

=== Declined bids ===
The following schools declined to play in the 2024 NIT:

- Arizona State
- Oklahoma
- Stanford
- California
- Ole Miss
- Syracuse
- Florida State
- Oregon State
- UCLA
- Indiana
- Pittsburgh
- USC
- Maryland
- St. Bonaventure
- Washington
- Memphis
- St. John's

== Bracket ==
The 32-team bracket was announced at 9:30 p.m. EDT on ESPN2.

First round March 19–20; Campus sites
1	Seton Hall	75^{OT}
8	Saint Joseph's	72
4	LSU	77
5	North Texas	84
2	Princeton	77
7	UNLV	84
3	Providence	57
6	Boston College	62

Second round March 23–24; Campus sites
1	Seton Hall	72
5	North Texas	58
7	UNLV	79
6	Boston College	70

Quarterfinal; March 27
1	Seton Hall	91
7	UNLV	68

First round March 19–20; Campus sites
1	Wake Forest	87
8	Appalachian State	76
4	Georgia	78
5	Xavier	76
2	Ohio State	88
7	Cornell	83
3	Virginia Tech	74
6	Richmond	58

Second round March 23–24; Campus sites
1	Wake Forest	66
4	Georgia	72
2	Ohio State	81
3	Virginia Tech	73

Quarterfinal; March 26
4	Georgia	79
2	Ohio State	77

First round March 19–20; Campus sites
1	Indiana State	101
8	SMU	92
4	Butler	72
5	Minnesota	73
2	Cincinnati	73^{OT}
7	San Francisco	72
3	Bradley	74
6	Loyola Chicago	62

Second round March 23–24; Campus sites
1	Indiana State	76
5	Minnesota	64
2	Cincinnati	74
3	Bradley	57

Quarterfinal; March 26
1	Indiana State	85
2	Cincinnati	81

First round March 19–20; Campus sites
1	Villanova	61
8	VCU	70
4	UCF	77
5	South Florida	83
2	Utah	84
7	UC Irvine	75
3	Iowa	91
6	Kansas State	82

Second round March 23–24; Campus sites
8	VCU	70
5	South Florida	65
2	Utah	91
3	Iowa	82

Quarterfinal; March 27
8	VCU	54
2	Utah	74

Semifinals; April 2 Hinkle Fieldhouse
1	Seton Hall	84
4	Georgia	67
1	Indiana State	100
2	Utah	90

Final; April 4 Hinkle Fieldhouse
1	Seton Hall	79
1	Indiana State	77

== Game summaries ==
All times are in Eastern Daylight Time (UTC−4)

=== First round ===
SECN

March 19
7:00 p.m.

Box

North Texas 84, LSU 77
Scoring by half: 38–31, 46–46
Pts: Noland 21; Rebs: Scott, Sissoko 7 Asts: Jones 4	Pts: Wright 25; Rebs: Hannibal 9 Asts: Hannibal, Wright 4
North Texas advances to NIT second round

Pete Maravich Assembly Center
Baton Rouge, Louisiana
Attendance: 2,210
Referees: Michael Wallace, Robert Felder, Chase Shaw

ESPNU

March 19
7:00 p.m.

Box

Boston College 62, Providence 57
Scoring by half: 31–30, 31–27
Pts: Harris 17; Rebs: McGlockton 9 Asts: Zackery 5	Pts: Pierre 21; Rebs: Oduro 9 Asts: Oduro 4
Boston College advances to NIT second round

Amica Mutual Pavilion
Providence, Rhode Island
Attendance: 6,507
Referees: Vasili Mallios, Mike Fleury, Michael Luckie

ESPN

March 19
7:00 p.m.

Box

Xavier 76, Georgia 78
Scoring by half: 34–46, 42–32
Pts: Claude 30; Rebs: Ousmane 10; Asts: Claude 5	Pts: Demary 16; Rebs: James, Tchewa 6 Asts: Demary, Tchewa 4
Georgia advances to NIT second round

Stegeman Coliseum
Athens, Georgia
Attendance: 2,756
Referees: Shaun Seales, Josue Nieves, Garrick Shannon

ESPN2

March 19
7:00 p.m.

Box

Cornell 83, Ohio State 88
Scoring by half: 38–44, 45–44
Pts: Gray 19; Rebs: Ragland 9 Asts: Okereke 6	Pts: Battle, Gayle 17; Rebs: Battle 8 Asts: Battle 5
Ohio State advances to NIT second round

Value City Arena
Columbus, Ohio
Attendance: 4,517
Referees: Jim Bruno, Mason Siler, Tim Comer

ESPN2

March 19
9:00 p.m.

Box

Richmond 58, Virginia Tech 74
Scoring by half: 28–33, 30–41
Pts: Bailey, Bigelow 15; Rebs: Bigelow 7 Asts: King 4	Pts: Kidd 20; Rebs: Kidd 8 Asts: Pedulla 7
Virginia Tech advances to NIT second round

Cassell Coliseum
Blacksburg, Virginia
Attendance: 3,183
Referees: Adam Flore, Kellen Miliner, Raymond Styons Jr.

ESPNU

March 19
9:00 p.m.

Box

Minnesota 73, Butler 72
Scoring by half: 36–38, 37–34
Pts: Garcia 25; Rebs: Hawkins 6 Asts: Garcia 4	Pts: Telfort 25; Rebs: Telfort, Thomas 6 Asts: Davis 7
Minnesota advances to NIT second round

Hinkle Fieldhouse
Indianapolis, Indiana
Attendance: 3,478
Referees: Connor Mooney, Nic Terry, Michael Kitts

ESPN+

March 19
9:00 p.m.

Box

South Florida 83, UCF 77
Scoring by half: 49–35, 34–42
Pts: Miguel 19; Rebs: Stroud 9 Asts: Stroud 3	Pts: Sellers 24; Rebs: Avery 9 Asts: Johnson 4
South Florida advances to NIT second round

Addition Financial Arena
Orlando, Florida
Attendance: 4,164
Referees: Anthony Eades, Blake Harris, Landon Brandes

ESPN

March 19
9:00 p.m.

Box

Kansas State 82, Iowa 91
Scoring by half: 39–50, 43–41
Pts: Ames 16; Rebs: McNair, N'Guessan 7 Asts: Ames 5	Pts: Sandfort 30; Rebs: Sandfort 12; Asts: Perkins 8
Iowa advances to NIT second round

Carver–Hawkeye Arena
Iowa City, Iowa
Attendance: 4,532
Referees: Rob Kueneman, Jourdan Love, Tony Meeks

ESPN2

March 19
11:00 p.m.

Box

UC Irvine 75, Utah 84
Scoring by half: 40–46, 35–38
Pts: Saran 16; Rebs: Tillis 7 Asts: Crockrell 5	Pts: Br. Carlson 21; Rebs: Br. Carlson 11; Asts: Smith 10
Utah advances to NIT second round

Jon M. Huntsman Center
Salt Lake City, Utah
Attendance: 3,137
Referees: Chad Shepherd, Casey McClellan, Ryan Holmes

ESPN2

March 20
7:00 p.m.

Box

Saint Joseph's 72, Seton Hall 75 (OT)
Scoring by half: 40–37, 28–31 Overtime: 4–7
Pts: Reynolds 27; Rebs: Essandoko 8 Asts: X. Brown 10	Pts: Dawes 26; Rebs: Davis 11; Asts: Richmond 5
Seton Hall advances to NIT second round

Walsh Gymnasium
South Orange, New Jersey
Attendance: 1,233
Referees: Jason Bradwell, Greg Moyer, Eddie Corbett Jr.

ESPN+

March 20
7:00 p.m.

Box

SMU 92, Indiana State 101
Scoring by half: 49–40, 43–61
Pts: Hudson, Phelps 21; Rebs: Phelps 7 Asts: Harris 4	Pts: Kent 35; Rebs: Kent 9 Asts: Avila, Larry 7
Indiana State advances to NIT second round

Hulman Center
Terre Haute, Indiana
Attendance: 6,421
Referees: Chase Shaw, James Duke, Kelly Self

ESPN+

March 20
7:00 p.m.

Box

Loyola Chicago 62, Bradley 74
Scoring by half: 19–36, 43–38
Pts: Norris 17; Rebs: Adelekun, Rubin 7 Asts: Dolan, Quinn 2	Pts: Deen 18; Rebs: Leons 10; Asts: Deen 4
Bradley advances to NIT second round

Carver Arena
Peoria, Illinois
Attendance: 4,691
Referees: Mike O'Neill, Kenneth Morehead, Steve Honaki

ESPN+

March 20
8:00 p.m.

Box

UNLV 84, Princeton 77
Scoring by half: 36–38, 48–39
Pts: Whaley 21; Rebs: Ke. Boone 11; Asts: Nowell, Thomas 4	Pts: Pierce 22; Rebs: Pierce 6 Asts: Lee 6
UNLV advances to NIT second round

Jadwin Gymnasium
Princeton, New Jersey
Attendance: 1,708

ESPN+

March 20
8:00 p.m.

Box

Appalachian State 76, Wake Forest 87
Scoring by half: 27–36, 49–51
Pts: Huntley 16; Rebs: Spillers 10; Asts: Tate 5	Pts: Miller 31; Rebs: Reid 12; Asts: Miller, Reid 3
Wake Forest advances to NIT second round

LJVM Coliseum
Winston-Salem, North Carolina
Attendance: 6,733
Referees: Isaac Barnett, Raymond Styons, Jerry Heater

ESPN+

March 20
9:00 p.m.

Box

San Francisco 72, Cincinnati 73 (OT)
Scoring by half: 35–38, 32–29 Overtime: 5–6
Pts: Thomas 31; Rebs: Mogbo 10; Asts: Mogbo, Williams 7	Pts: Lukošius 28; Rebs: Newman 9 Asts: Thomas 8
Cincinnati advances to NIT second round

Fifth Third Arena
Cincinnati, Ohio
Attendance: 3,899
Referees: Alexander Thompson, Shane Staggs, Craig Murley

ESPN2

March 20
9:00 p.m.

Box

VCU 70, Villanova 61
Scoring by half: 31–30, 39–31
Pts: Bamisile 17; Rebs: Lawal 10; Asts: Shulga 6	Pts: Dixon 21; Rebs: Dixon 13; Asts: Armstrong 5
VCU advances to NIT second round

Finneran Pavilion
Villanova, Pennsylvania
Attendance: 1,763
Referees: Mike Millione, Mike Nardone, Steven Perry

=== Second round ===
ESPN2

March 23
11:30 a.m.

Box

North Texas 58, Seton Hall 72
Scoring by half: 24–33, 34–39
Pts: Edwards 23; Rebs: Noland 7 Asts: Scott 5	Pts: Davis 18; Rebs: Richmond 15; Asts: Richmond 6
Seton Hall advances to NIT quarterfinals

Walsh Gymnasium
South Orange, New Jersey
Attendance: 1,204
Referees: Michael Fleury, Adam Vandenburgh, Mike Millione

ESPN+

March 23
2:00 p.m.

Box

Bradley 57, Cincinnati 74
Scoring by half: 28–36, 29–38
Pts: Leons 16; Rebs: Davis 8 Asts: Hannah 3	Pts: James 25; Rebs: Newman 10; Asts: Newman 4
Cincinnati advances to NIT quarterfinals

Fifth Third Arena
Cincinnati, Ohio
Attendance: 4,732
Referees: Hunter Allen, Stephen Orkus Jr., Landon Brandes

ESPN+

March 23
7:00 p.m.

Box

Virginia Tech 73, Ohio State 81
Scoring by half: 26–36, 47–45
Pts: Cattoor, Pedulla 18; Rebs: Kidd, Pedulla, Poteat 6 Asts: Pedulla 8	Pts: Battle 21; Rebs: Battle 10; Asts: Thornton 7
Ohio State advances to NIT quarterfinals

Value City Arena
Columbus, Ohio
Attendance: 7,541
Referees: Mike Pearson, Anthony Burris, Bill Ek

ESPN2

March 24
2:00 p.m.

Box

Minnesota 64, Indiana State 76
Scoring by half: 28–38, 36–38
Pts: Payne 16; Rebs: Garcia 12; Asts: Payne 3	Pts: Conwell 23; Rebs: Kent 11; Asts: Conwell 5
Indiana State advances to NIT quarterfinals

Hulman Center
Terre Haute, Indiana
Attendance: 8,239
Referees: Shane Staggs, James Hicks, John St. Clair

ESPN2

March 24
4:00 p.m.

Box

Georgia 72, Wake Forest 66
Scoring by half: 39–24, 33–42
Pts: Hill 21; Rebs: Anselem-Ibe 8 Asts: DeLoach 4	Pts: Carr 31; Rebs: Carr 11; Asts: Clark, Hildreth 4
Georgia advances to NIT quarterfinals

LJVM Coliseum
Winston-Salem, North Carolina
Attendance: 4,772
Referees: JW Lucas, Jeff Pon, Raymond Styons Jr.

ESPNU

March 24
7:30 p.m.

Box

VCU 70, South Florida 65
Scoring by half: 32–30, 38–35
Pts: Jackson 14; Rebs: Bairstow 6 Asts: Bairstow, Shulga 4	Pts: Youngblood 28; Rebs: Pryor 10; Asts: Pryor 3
VCU advances to NIT quarterfinals

Yuengling Center
Tampa, Florida
Attendance: 6,398
Referees: Erroll Lewis, Michael Wallace, Shane Land

ESPN2

March 24
9:00 p.m.

Box

Iowa 82, Utah 91
Scoring by half: 36–48, 46–43
Pts: McCaffery 19; Rebs: Freeman 7 Asts: Freeman, Harding 4	Pts: Madsen 31; Rebs: Lovering, Smith 10; Asts: Smith 10
Utah advances to NIT quarterfinals

Jon M. Huntsman Center
Salt Lake City, Utah
Attendance: 3,804
Referees: Layne Barney, Matt Basham, Matt Rafferty

ESPNU

March 24
9:30 p.m.

Box

Boston College 70, UNLV 79
Scoring by half: 37–37, 33–42
Pts: Post 22; Rebs: Post 9 Asts: McGlockton 5	Pts: Ke. Boone 19; Rebs: Ke. Boone 8 Asts: Thomas, Whaley 5
UNLV advances to NIT quarterfinals

Thomas & Mack Center
Paradise, Nevada
Attendance: 5,543
Referees: Deron White, Crystal Hogan, Ryan Holmes

=== Quarterfinals ===
ESPN

March 26
7:00 p.m.

Box

Georgia 79, Ohio State 77
Scoring by half: 36–35, 43–42
Pts: Thomasson 21; Rebs: Anselem-Ibe 10; Asts: Hill 5	Pts: Battle 22; Rebs: Battle 8 Asts: Thornton 10
Georgia advances to NIT semifinals

Value City Arena
Columbus, Ohio
Attendance: 7,641
Referees: Andy O'Brian, Alfred Smith, John Floyd

ESPN

March 26
9:00 p.m.

Box

Cincinnati 81, Indiana State 85
Scoring by half: 36–32, 45–53
Pts: Lukošius 26; Rebs: Skillings 12; Asts: James 5	Pts: Avila 22; Rebs: Kent 7 Asts: Avila 6
Indiana State advances to NIT semifinals

Hulman Center
Terre Haute, Indiana
Attendance: 8,057
Referees: Steve Divine, Edwin Young, Bret Smith

ESPN2

March 27
7:00 p.m.

Box

UNLV 68, Seton Hall 91
Scoring by half: 26–44, 42–47
Pts: Ka. Boone 16; Rebs: Whaley 7 Asts: Thomas, Webster 4	Pts: Dawes 21; Rebs: Davis 7 Asts: Richmond 10
Seton Hall advances to NIT semifinals

Walsh Gymnasium
South Orange, New Jersey
Attendance: 1,316
Referees: Michael Palau, Greg Evans, Evon Burroughs

ESPN2

March 27
9:00 p.m.

Box

VCU 54, Utah 74
Scoring by half: 26–36, 28–38
Pts: Bairstow 13; Rebs: Fermin 9 Asts: Bamisile 2	Pts: Madsen 18; Rebs: Smith 11; Asts: Smith 12
Utah advances to NIT semifinals

Jon M. Huntsman Center
Salt Lake City, Utah
Attendance: 6,008
Referees: Mike Littlewood, DG Nelson, Tommy Johnson

=== Semifinals ===
ESPN

April 2
7:00 p.m.

Box

Utah 90, Indiana State 100
Scoring by half: 44–46, 44–56
Pts: Smith 28; Rebs: Smith 7 Asts: Smith 6	Pts: Conwell 27; Rebs: Avila 10; Asts: Larry 8
Indiana State advances to NIT final

Hinkle Fieldhouse
Indianapolis, Indiana
Attendance: 8,889
Referees: D.J. Carstensen, Brooks Wells, Randy Richardson

ESPN2

April 2
9:35 p.m.

Box

Georgia 67, Seton Hall 84
Scoring by half: 29–42, 42–42
Pts: Demary Jr. 19; Rebs: DeLoach, Melendez, Thomasson 4 Asts: Demary Jr. 4	Pts: Dawes 20; Rebs: Davis, Richmond 9 Asts: Richmond 6
Seton Hall advances to NIT final

Hinkle Fieldhouse
Indianapolis, Indiana
Referees: Lamar Simpson, Bart Lenox, Tommy Morrissey

=== Final ===
ESPN

April 4
7:00 p.m.

Box

Indiana State 77, Seton Hall 79
Scoring by half: 39–39, 38-40
Pts: Swope 19; Rebs: Conwell 12; Asts: Larry 6	Pts: Dawes 24; Rebs: Richmond 13; Asts: Richmond 5
Seton Hall wins NIT Championship

Hinkle Fieldhouse
Indianapolis, Indiana
Attendance: 9,100
Referees: Jeb Hartness, Brent Hampton, Steven Anderson

== Media ==
ESPN, Inc. has exclusive rights to all of the NIT games. It telecast every game across ESPN, ESPN2, ESPNU, ESPN3 and ESPN+. Westwood One has exclusive radio rights to the semifinals and the championship.

== See also ==
- 2024 Women's National Invitation Tournament
- 2024 NCAA Division I men's basketball tournament
- 2024 College Basketball Invitational
- 2024 CollegeInsider.com Postseason Tournament
