= 2023–24 Loyola Ramblers men's basketball team =

American college basketball season

2023–24 Loyola Ramblers men's basketball

Atlantic 10 regular season co-champions

NIT, First Round
- Conference: Atlantic 10 Conference
- Record: 23–10 (15–3 A–10)
- Head coach: Drew Valentine (3rd season)
- Assistant coaches: Sean Dwyer; Will Bailey; Justin Bradley
- Home arena: Joseph J. Gentile Arena

2023–24 Atlantic 10 men's basketball standings
	Conf.				Overall
Team	W		L	PCT	W		L	PCT
Richmond	15	–	3	.833	23	–	10	.697
Loyola Chicago	15	–	3	.833	23	–	10	.697
No. 24 Dayton	14	–	4	.778	25	–	8	.758
UMass	11	–	7	.611	20	–	11	.645
VCU	11	–	7	.611	24	–	14	.632
Duquesne †	10	–	8	.556	25	–	12	.676
St. Bonaventure	9	–	9	.500	20	–	13	.606
George Mason	9	–	9	.500	20	–	12	.625
Saint Joseph's	9	–	9	.500	21	–	14	.600
La Salle	6	–	12	.333	16	–	17	.485
Rhode Island	6	–	12	.333	12	–	20	.375
Fordham	6	–	12	.333	13	–	20	.394
Davidson	5	–	13	.278	15	–	17	.469
Saint Louis	5	–	13	.278	13	–	20	.394
George Washington	4	–	14	.222	15	–	17	.469
† 2024 A-10 tournament winner Rankings from AP poll

The 2023–24 Loyola Ramblers men's basketball team represented Loyola University Chicago during the 2023–24 NCAA Division I men's basketball season. The Ramblers, led by third-year head coach Drew Valentine, played their home games at the Joseph J. Gentile Arena in Chicago, Illinois as second-year members of the Atlantic 10 Conference (A-10). They finished the season 23–10, 15–3 in A-10 play to finish in a tie for the regular season championship. As the No. 2 seed in the A-10 tournament, they lost to St. Bonaventure in the quarterfinals. They received a bid to the National Invitation Tournament where they lost to Bradley in the first round.

== Previous season ==
The Ramblers finished 2022–23 season 10–21, 4–14 in A-10 play, to finish in last place. They lost to Saint Joseph's in the first round of the A-10 tournament.

== Offseason ==
=== Departures ===
Name	Number	Pos.	Height	Weight	Year	Hometown	Reason for departure
Saint Thomas	0	F	6'7"	215	Sophomore	Omaha, NE	Transferred to Northern Colorado
Marquise Kennedy	12	G	6'1"	190	Senior	Chicago, IL	Graduate transferred to UIC
Jacob Hutson	22	C	6'11"	250	Junior	Edina, MN	Transferred to Northern Iowa
Jeameril Wilson	25	F	6'7"	200	GS Senior	Chicago, IL	Graduated
Nolan Marold	32	F	6'8"	230	Freshman	Highlands Ranch, CO	Walk-on; transferred to Saint Michael's
Bryce Golden	35	C	6'9"	245	GS Senior	Richmond, VA	Graduated

=== Incoming transfers ===
Name	Number	Pos.	Height	Weight	Year	Hometown	Previous school
Desmond Watson	0	G/F	6'5"	205	Junior	Columbus, OH	Davidson
Greg Dolan	12	G	6'3"	188	GS Senior	Williamsville, NY	Cornell
Patrick Mwamba	30	F	6'7"	206	GS Senior	Kinshasa, Congo	Oral Roberts
Dame Adelekun	32	F	6'8"	220	GS Senior	Gastonia, NC	Dartmouth

=== 2023 recruiting class ===
College recruiting information
Name	Hometown	School	Height	Weight	Commit date
Miles Rubin #47 PF	Chicago, IL	Simeon Career Academy	6 ft 8 in (2.03 m)	210 lb (95 kg)	Jun 20, 2021
Miles Rubin #47 PF	Recruit ratings: Rivals: 247Sports: ESPN: (77)				
Overall recruit ranking:
Note: In many cases, Scout, Rivals, 247Sports, On3, and ESPN may conflict in their listings of height and weight.; In these cases, the average was taken. ESPN grades are on a 100-point scale.; Sources: "2023 Loyola Ramblers Recruiting Class". ESPN.; "2023 Team Ranking". Rivals.

=== 2024 recruiting class ===
College recruiting information (2024)
Name	Hometown	School	Height	Weight	Commit date
Jack Turner; SG	Bellflower, CA	St. John Bosco High School	6 ft 8 in (2.03 m)	210 lb (95 kg)	Oct 25, 2022
Jack Turner; SG	Recruit ratings: Rivals: 247Sports: ESPN: (NR)				
Brayden Young; C	Houston, TX	Cy Falls High School	6 ft 9 in (2.06 m)	205 lb (93 kg)	Oct 19, 2023
Brayden Young; C	Recruit ratings: Rivals: 247Sports: ESPN: (NR)				
Overall recruit ranking:
Note: In many cases, Scout, Rivals, 247Sports, On3, and ESPN may conflict in their listings of height and weight.; In these cases, the average was taken. ESPN grades are on a 100-point scale.; Sources: "2024 Loyola Ramblers Recruiting Class". ESPN.; "2024 Team Ranking". Rivals.

== Roster ==
2023–24 Loyola Ramblers men's basketball team
Players
Coaches

Pos.	#	Name	Height	Weight	Year	Previous school	Hometown
G/F	0	Desmond Watson	6 ft 5 in (1.96 m)	210 lb (95 kg)	Jr	St. Francis DeSales; Davidson	Columbus, OH
G	1	Jayden Dawson	6 ft 4 in (1.93 m)	195 lb (88 kg)	So	Omaha Central	Omaha, NE
G	2	Jalen Quinn	6 ft 3 in (1.91 m)	195 lb (88 kg)	So	Tuscola	Tuscola, IL
G	4	Braden Norris	6 ft 0 in (1.83 m)	180 lb (82 kg)	GS	Hilliard Bradley; Oakland	Hilliard, OH
G	5	Trey Lewis	6 ft 6 in (1.98 m)	200 lb (91 kg)	RS Fr	Ferndale	Ferndale, MI
F	10	Tom Welch	6 ft 8 in (2.03 m)	220 lb (100 kg)	GS	Naperville North	Naperville, IL
G	12	Greg Dolan	6 ft 3 in (1.91 m)	188 lb (85 kg)	Sr	Northfield Mount Hermon; Cornell	Williamsville, NY
G	13	Sheldon Edwards	6 ft 4 in (1.93 m)	190 lb (86 kg)	Sr	TLAP Sports Academy; Valparaiso	West Palm Beach, FL
G	14	Caleb Reese (W)	5 ft 11 in (1.8 m)	160 lb (73 kg)	So	De La Salle	Warren, MI
F	23	Philip Alston	6 ft 6 in (1.98 m)	235 lb (107 kg)	Jr	Westerville North; California (PA)	Columbus, OH
C	24	Miles Rubin	6 ft 10 in (2.08 m)	205 lb (93 kg)	Fr	Simeon	Chicago, IL
F	30	Patrick Mwamba	6 ft 7 in (2.01 m)	210 lb (95 kg)	GS	NBA Academy Africa; Oral Roberts	Kinshasa, Congo
G	31	Will Smythe (W)	6 ft 4 in (1.93 m)	170 lb (77 kg)	RS So	St. Mary's Prep	Rochester Hills, MI
F	32	Dame Adelekun	6 ft 8 in (2.03 m)	230 lb (104 kg)	GS	Gaston Day School; Dartmouth	Gastonia, NC
G/F	33	Ben Schwieger	6 ft 7 in (2.01 m)	205 lb (93 kg)	RS So	Waubonsie Valley	Aurora, IL
F	34	Matthew Mortenson (W)	6 ft 4 in (1.93 m)	215 lb (98 kg)	Fr	IMG Academy	Plano, TX

Head coach

- Drew Valentine (Oakland)

Assistant coach(es)

- Sean Dwyer (Michigan State)
- Will Bailey (UAB)
- Justin Bradley (Guilford)

Legend

- (C) Team captain
- (S) Suspended
- (I) Ineligible
- (W) Walk-on
- Injured
- Current redshirt

Roster
Last update: April 6, 2024

== Schedule and results ==
Date time, TV	Rank^{#}	Opponent^{#}	Result	Record	High points	High rebounds	High assists	Site (attendance) city, state
Exhibition
October 29, 2023*; 3:30 p.m.		Trinity Christian	W 104–44		17 – Alston	8 – Adelekun	9 – Norris	Joseph J. Gentile Arena (2,169); Chicago, IL
Non-conference regular season
November 8, 2023*; 6:00 p.m., Barstool.tv		vs. No. 10 Florida Atlantic; Barstool Sports Invitational	L 62–75	0–1	15 – Alston	6 – Alston	3 – tied	Wintrust Arena (2,169); Chicago, IL
November 11, 2023*; 7:00 p.m., NBCSCHI+/ESPN+		Eastern Illinois	W 89–65	1–1	24 – Watson	7 – Rubin	7 – Norris	Joseph J. Gentile Arena (3,311); Chicago, IL
November 14, 2023*; 7:00 p.m., NBCSCHI/ESPN+		UIC	L 67–72	1–2	13 – Watson	7 – Norris	5 – Norris	Joseph J. Gentile Arena (2,659); Chicago, IL
November 18, 2023*; 3:00 p.m., NBCSCHI+/ESPN+		New Orleans	W 73–70	2–2	22 – Adelekun	11 – Adelekun	7 – Dolan	Joseph J. Gentile Arena (2,833); Chicago, IL
November 22, 2023*; 3:00 p.m., CBSSN		vs. No. 8 Creighton; Hall of Fame Classic semifinals	L 65–88	2–3	15 – Watson	7 – Rubin	5 – Norris	T-Mobile Center; Kansas City, MO
November 23, 2023*; 12:30 p.m., CBSSN		vs. Boston College; Hall of Fame Classic consolation game	W 71–68	3–3	20 – Norris	7 – Norris	5 – Dolan	T-Mobile Center; Kansas City, MO
November 28, 2023*; 7:00 p.m., ESPN+		Chicago State	W 62–53	4–3	15 – Quinn	5 – Watson	6 – Norris	Joseph J. Gentile Arena (2,003); Chicago, IL
December 2, 2023*; 3:00 p.m., NBCSCHI+/ESPN+		Harvard	W 75–53	5–3	16 – Alston	9 – Rubin	7 – Dolan	Joseph J. Gentile Arena (3,754); Chicago, IL
December 5, 2023*; 7:30 p.m., ESPN+		at Tulsa	L 77–88	5–4	26 – Dawson	7 – Dawson	7 – Norris	Reynolds Center (2,822); Tulsa, OK
December 9, 2023*; 5:00 p.m., NBCSCHI+/ESPN+		Goshen	W 115–64	6–4	25 – Alston	7 – Adelekun	6 – Norris	Joseph J. Gentile Arena (2,286); Chicago, IL
December 17, 2023*; 3:00 p.m., ESPN+		at South Florida	L 64–77	6–5	27 – Alston	6 – Norris	7 – Norris	Yuengling Center; Tampa, FL
December 19, 2023*; 7:00 p.m., ESPN+		Charleston Southern	W 72–59	7–5	12 – tied	7 – Rubin	3 – tied	Joseph J. Gentile Arena (2,004); Chicago, IL
December 30, 2023*; 1:00 p.m., NBCSCHI/ESPN+		Central Michigan	W 73–35	8–5	15 – Alston	9 – Rubin	6 – Norris	Joseph J. Gentile Arena (2,377); Chicago, IL
Atlantic 10 regular season
January 3, 2024; 6:00 p.m., ESPN+		at Saint Louis	W 80–73	9–5 (1–0)	24 – Watson	6 – tied	7 – Norris	Chaifetz Arena (7,068); St. Louis, MO
January 6, 2024; 3:00 p.m., CBSSN		Duquesne	W 72–67	10–5 (2–0)	17 – Alston	7 – Dawson	5 – Dawson	Joseph J. Gentile Arena (2,671); Chicago, IL
January 9, 2024; 7:00 p.m., NBCSCHI/ESPN+		Richmond	L 56–58	10–6 (2–1)	16 – Dawson	8 – Dawson	5 – Quinn	Joseph J. Gentile Arena (1,834); Chicago, IL
January 13, 2024; 3:00 p.m., ESPNU		at Saint Joseph's	W 78–75	11–6 (3–1)	20 – Dawson	7 – tied	4 – Watson	Hagan Arena (2,142); Philadelphia, PA
January 17, 2024; 6:00 p.m., CBSSN		UMass	W 79–78	12–6 (4–1)	23 – Alston	9 – Watson	6 – Norris	Joseph J. Gentile Arena (2,748); Chicago, IL
January 20, 2024; 12:00 p.m., ESPN+		at Fordham	W 65–61	13–6 (5–1)	19 – Watson	5 – Dolan	3 – tied	Rose Hill Gymnasium (1,756); The Bronx, NY
January 23, 2024; 6:00 p.m., CBSSN		at VCU	L 67–74	13–7 (5–2)	14 – Adelekun	10 – Rubin	4 – Norris	Siegel Center (7,204); Richmond, VA
January 30, 2024; 7:00 p.m., NBCSCHI+/ESPN+		Saint Louis	W 77–62	14–7 (6–2)	20 – Watson	7 – Rubin	3 – Watson	Joseph J. Gentile Arena (3,488); Chicago, IL
February 4, 2024; 12:00 p.m., CBSSN		Davidson	W 76–63	15–7 (7–2)	18 – Watson	9 – Adelekun	6 – Watson	Joseph J. Gentile Arena (4,253); Chicago, IL
February 7, 2024; 6:00 p.m., ESPN+		at George Mason	W 85–79	16–7 (8–2)	27 – Edwards	5 – Adelekun	3 – tied	EagleBank Arena (2,645); Fairfax, VA
February 10, 2024; 11:00 a.m., ESPN+		at George Washington	W 81–73	17–7 (9–2)	18 – Edwards	8 – Alston	4 – tied	Charles E. Smith Center (2,520); Washington, D.C.
February 14, 2024; 7:00 p.m., NBCSCHI+/ESPN+		Saint Joseph's	W 64–59	18–7 (10–2)	14 – Alston	8 – tied	7 – Norris	Joseph J. Gentile Arena (2,794); Chicago, IL
February 18, 2024; 11:00 a.m., CBSSN		at Rhode Island	W 77–67	19–7 (11–2)	21 – tied	10 – Alston	8 – Norris	Ryan Center (5,407); Kingston, RI
February 24, 2024; 3:30 p.m., USA		George Mason	W 80–59	20–7 (12–2)	10 – tied	7 – Watson	8 – Norris	Joseph J. Gentile Arena (4,557); Chicago, IL
February 27, 2024; 6:00 p.m., ESPN+		at St. Bonaventure	L 64–79	20–8 (12–3)	12 – Alston	9 – Watson	7 – Norris	Reilly Center (3,855); Olean, NY
March 1, 2024; 8:00 p.m., ESPN2		No. 21 Dayton	W 77–72	21–8 (13–3)	24 – Watson	7 – Alston	11 – Norris	Joseph J. Gentile Arena (4,557); Chicago, IL
March 6, 2024; 6:00 p.m., ESPN+		at Davidson	W 69–59	22–8 (14–3)	13 – tied	9 – Rubin	5 – Watson	John M. Belk Arena (2,856); Davidson, NC
March 9, 2024; 3:00 p.m., NBCSCHI+/ESPN+		La Salle	W 64–54	23–8 (15–3)	12 – Adelekun	10 – Adelekun	3 – tied	Joseph J. Gentile Arena (4,557); Chicago, IL
A-10 tournament
March 14, 2024; 5:00 p.m., USA	(2)	vs. (7) St. Bonaventure; Quarterfinals	L 74–75 ^{2OT}	23–9	22 – Alston	8 – tied	6 – Watson	Barclays Center; Brooklyn, NY
NIT
March 20, 2024; 6:00 p.m., ESPN+		at (3) Bradley; First Round – Indiana State Bracket	L 62–74	23–10	17 – Norris	7 – tied	2 – tied	Carver Arena (4,691); Peoria, IL
*Non-conference game. ^{#}Rankings from AP poll. (#) Tournament seedings in parentheses. All times are in Central Time.
