= 2023–24 VCU Rams men's basketball team =

American college basketball season

2023–24 VCU Rams men's basketball

NIT, Quarterfinals
- Conference: Atlantic 10 Conference
- Record: 24–14 (11–7 A-10)
- Head coach: Ryan Odom (1st season)
- Assistant coaches: Darius Theus; Bryce Crawford; Matt Henry
- Home arena: Stuart C. Siegel Center

2023–24 Atlantic 10 men's basketball standings
	Conf.				Overall
Team	W		L	PCT	W		L	PCT
Richmond	15	–	3	.833	23	–	10	.697
Loyola Chicago	15	–	3	.833	23	–	10	.697
No. 24 Dayton	14	–	4	.778	25	–	8	.758
UMass	11	–	7	.611	20	–	11	.645
VCU	11	–	7	.611	24	–	14	.632
Duquesne †	10	–	8	.556	25	–	12	.676
St. Bonaventure	9	–	9	.500	20	–	13	.606
George Mason	9	–	9	.500	20	–	12	.625
Saint Joseph's	9	–	9	.500	21	–	14	.600
La Salle	6	–	12	.333	16	–	17	.485
Rhode Island	6	–	12	.333	12	–	20	.375
Fordham	6	–	12	.333	13	–	20	.394
Davidson	5	–	13	.278	15	–	17	.469
Saint Louis	5	–	13	.278	13	–	20	.394
George Washington	4	–	14	.222	15	–	17	.469
† 2024 A-10 tournament winner Rankings from AP poll

The 2023–24 VCU Rams men's basketball team represented Virginia Commonwealth University during the 2023–24 NCAA Division I men's basketball season. The Rams, led by first-year head coach Ryan Odom, played their home games at the Siegel Center in Richmond, Virginia as a member of the Atlantic 10 Conference.

== Previous season ==
The Rams finished the 2022–23 season 27–8, 15–3 in A-10 play to win the regular season championship. They defeated Davidson, Saint Louis, and Dayton to win the A-10 tournament championship, their first since 2015. As a result, they received the conference's automatic bid to the NCAA tournament as the No. 12 seed in the West region. There they lost to Saint Mary's in the first round. VCU guard, Ace Baldwin Jr., was named the Atlantic 10 Conference Men's Basketball Player of the Year.

On March 29, 2023, head coach Mike Rhoades left the school to take the head coaching position at Penn State. That same day, the school named Utah State head coach Ryan Odom the team's new coach. On April 8, Odom announced former VCU player, Darius Theus as an assistant coach to his staff.

== Offseason ==
=== Departures ===
Name	Number	Pos.	Height	Weight	Year	Hometown	Notes
Jamir Watkins	0	F	6 ft 7 in (2.01 m)	210	RS Sophomore	Trenton, New Jersey	Transferred to Florida State
Ace Baldwin Jr.	1	G	6 ft 1 in (1.85 m)	190	Junior	Baltimore, Maryland	Transferred to Penn State
Jalen DeLoach	4	F	6 ft 9 in (2.06 m)	215	Junior	Savannah, Georgia	Transferred to Georgia
Arnold Henderson VI	15	G	5 ft 10 in (1.78 m)	180	Senior	Mechanicsville, Virginia	Graduated
Jarren McAllister	21	G	6 ft 4 in (1.93 m)	205	RS Junior	Wake Forest, North Carolina	Transferred to TBD
Jayden Nunn	23	F	6 ft 4 in (1.93 m)	190	Junior	Flint, Michigan	Transferred to Baylor
Nick Kern Jr.	24	F	6 ft 6 in (1.98 m)	190	Junior	St. Louis, Missouri	Transferred to Penn State
Brandon Johns Jr.	30	F	6 ft 8 in (2.03 m)	240	Graduate	Lansing, Michigan	Graduated
Josh Banks	33	G	6 ft 5 in (1.96 m)	175	Junior	Charlotte, North Carolina	Transferred to UNC Asheville
David Shriver	35	F	6 ft 6 in (1.98 m)	220	RS Senior	Philippi, West Virginia	Graduated

=== Incoming transfers ===
Name	Number	Pos.	Height	Weight	Year	Hometown	Previous school
Sean Bairstow	7	G	6 ft 8 in (2.03 m)	205	Graduate	Brisbane, Australia	Transferred from Utah State
Joe Bamisile	22	G	6 ft 5 in (1.96 m)	195	Senior	Richmond, Virginia	Transferred from Oklahoma
Jason Nelson	1	G	5 ft 10 in (1.78 m)	175	RS Sophomore	Richmond, Virginia	Transferred from Richmond
Max Shulga	11	G	6 ft 4 in (1.93 m)	197	Senior	Kyiv, Ukraine	Transferred from Utah State
Roosevelt Wheeler	4	F/C	6 ft 11 in (2.11 m)	240	Junior	Richmond, Virginia	Transferred from Louisville

=== 2023 recruits ===
No players have officially committed to VCU.

== Roster ==
As of April 23, 2023

2023–24 VCU Rams men's basketball team
Players
Coaches

Pos.	#	Name	Height	Weight	Year	Previous school	Hometown
G	1	Jason Nelson	5 ft 10 in (1.78 m)	175 lb (79 kg)	RS So	Richmond	Richmond, VA
G	2	Zeb Jackson	6 ft 5 in (1.96 m)	180 lb (82 kg)	Sr	Michigan	Toledo, OH
F/C	4	Roosevelt Wheeler	6 ft 11 in (2.11 m)	240 lb (109 kg)	Jr	Louisville	Richmond, VA
G/F	5	Alphonzo Billups III	6 ft 7 in (2.01 m)	180 lb (82 kg)	So	Varina	Richmond, VA
G	7	Sean Bairstow	6 ft 8 in (2.03 m)	205 lb (93 kg)	GS	Utah State	Brisbane, QLD
G	8	Michael Belle	6 ft 7 in (2.01 m)	205 lb (93 kg)	Fr	Strasbourg	London, ENG
F	10	Tobi Lawal	6 ft 8 in (2.03 m)	200 lb (91 kg)	So	Lee Academy	London, ENG
G	11	Max Shulga	6 ft 9 in (2.06 m)	197 lb (89 kg)	Sr	Utah State	Kyiv, UKR
F	13	Kuany Kuany	6 ft 9 in (2.06 m)	200 lb (91 kg)	GS	California	Melbourne, VIC
G	14	Connor Odom	5 ft 11 in (1.8 m)	165 lb (75 kg)	Sr	Utah State	Annapolis, MD
F	21	Christian Fermin	6 ft 10 in (2.08 m)	215 lb (98 kg)	So	Pocono Mountain West	Tobyhanna, PA
G	22	Joe Bamisile	6 ft 5 in (1.96 m)	195 lb (88 kg)	Sr	Oklahoma	Richmond, VA
F	34	Obinnaya Okafor (W)	6 ft 9 in (2.06 m)	216 lb (98 kg)	So	Bethel	Hampton, VA

Head coach

- Ryan Odom (Hampden–Sydney)

Assistant coach(es)

- Bryce Crawford (Ohio State)
- Matt Henry (Trinity (TX))
- Darius Theus (VCU)

Legend

- (C) Team captain
- (S) Suspended
- (I) Ineligible
- (W) Walk-on
- Injured
- Current redshirt

Roster

== Schedule and results ==
Date time, TV	Rank^{#}	Opponent^{#}	Result	Record	High points	High rebounds	High assists	Site (attendance) city, state
Exhibition
October 28, 2023*; 7:00 p.m.		Mars Hill	W 110–50		21 – Nelson	8 – Belle	10 – Jackson	Siegel Center (5,017); Richmond, VA
Non-conference regular season
November 6, 2023*; 7:00 p.m., MASN/ESPN+		McNeese	L 65–76	0–1	22 – Shulga	7 – Jackson	8 – Jackson	Siegel Center (7,637); Richmond, VA
November 10, 2023*; 7:00 p.m., MASN/ESPN+		Samford	W 75–65	1–1	17 – Shulga	10 – Fermin	7 – Jackson	Siegel Center (7,114); Richmond, VA
November 15, 2023*; 7:00 p.m., MASN/ESPN+		Radford	W 73–50	2–1	19 – Nelson	10 – Lawal	5 – Jackson	Siegel Center (7,045); Richmond, VA
November 18, 2023*; 2:00 p.m., MASN/ESPN+		Seattle	W 60–56	3–1	20 – Jackson	9 – Fermin	7 – Shulga	Siegel Center (6,421); Richmond, VA
November 23, 2023*; 5:30 p.m., ESPN2		vs. Iowa State; ESPN Events Invitational quarterfinals	L 64–68	3–2	17 – Shulga	5 – Jackson	8 – Shulga	State Farm Field House; Bay Lake, FL
November 24, 2023*; 8:00 p.m., ESPN2/ESPNU		vs. Boise State; ESPN Events Invitational consolation 2nd round	L 61–65	3–3	24 – Shulga	9 – Lawal	3 – Tied	State Farm Field House (2,579); Bay Lake, FL
November 26, 2023*; 10:30 a.m., ESPNU		vs. Penn State; ESPN Events Invitational 7th place game	W 86–74	4–3	22 – Jackson	9 – Belle	6 – Jackson	State Farm Field House; Bay Lake, FL
December 1, 2023*; 7:00 p.m., MASN/ESPN+		Norfolk State	L 60–63	4–4	15 – Jackson	11 – Belle	3 – Tied	Siegel Center; Richmond, VA
December 6, 2023*; 7:00 p.m., ESPNU		Memphis	L 80–85 ^{OT}	4–5	14 – Shulga	8 – Tied	5 – Shulga	Siegel Center (7,637); Richmond, VA
December 10, 2023*; 2:00 p.m., MASN/ESPN+		Alcorn State	W 86–58	5–5	18 – Jackson	10 – Lawal	7 – Jackson	Siegel Center (6,389); Richmond, VA
December 16, 2023*; 2:00 p.m., MASN/ESPN+		Temple	W 87–78	6–5	19 – Jackson	7 – Lawal	7 – Jackson	Siegel Center (7,189); Richmond, VA
December 22, 2023*; 7:00 p.m., MASN/ESPN+		Maryland Eastern Shore	W 75–51	7–5	14 – Shulga	7 – Lawal	7 – Nelson	Siegel Center (7,098); Richmond, VA
December 30, 2023*; 7:00 p.m., MASN/ESPN+		Gardner–Webb	W 87–73	8–5	22 – Bairstow	10 – Lawal	5 – Tied	Siegel Center (7,188); Richmond, VA
Atlantic 10 regular season
January 3, 2024; 9:00 p.m., CBSSN		St. Bonaventure	L 78–89	8–6 (0–1)	15 – Fermin	9 – Fermin	6 – Bairstow	Siegel Center (6,348); Richmond, VA
January 6, 2024; 4:00 p.m., USA		George Washington	L 82–84	8–7 (0–2)	20 – Shulga	14 – Fermin	4 – Shulga	Siegel Center (7,207); Richmond, VA
January 9, 2024; 7:00 p.m., ESPN+		at George Mason; Rivalry	W 54–50	9–7 (1–2)	13 – Shulga	8 – Bairstow	3 – Shulga	EagleBank Arena (4,000); Fairfax, VA
January 13, 2024; 12:30 p.m., USA		at La Salle	W 71–65	10–7 (2–2)	14 – Bairstow	10 – Lawal	12 – Bairstow	Tom Gola Arena (1,647); Philadelphia, PA
January 19, 2024; 7:00 p.m., ESPN2		Saint Louis	W 85–61	11–7 (3–2)	29 – Bamisile	5 – Tied	6 – Bairstow	Siegel Center (7,637); Richmond, VA
January 23, 2024; 7:00 p.m., CBSSN		Loyola Chicago	W 74–67	12–7 (4–2)	25 – Bamisile	9 – Fermin	6 – Bairstow	Siegel Center (7,204); Richmond, VA
January 27, 2024; 8:00 p.m., CBSSN		at Davidson	W 63–58	13–7 (5–2)	18 – Shulga	6 – Lawal	4 – Bairstow	John M. Belk Arena (3,861); Davidson, NC
January 30, 2024; 7:00 p.m., CBSSN		at St. Bonaventure	L 62–67	13–8 (5–3)	25 – Shulga	6 – Jackson	3 – Tied	Reilly Center (3,901); Olean, NY
February 3, 2024; 4:00 p.m., ESPNU		Richmond; Capital City Classic	W 63–52	14–8 (6–3)	15 – Tied	8 – Lawal	6 – Jackson	Siegel Center (7,637); Richmond, VA
February 6, 2024; 7:00 p.m., ESPN+		at Fordham	W 75–60	15–8 (7–3)	13 – Shulga	10 – Shulga	7 – Shulga	Rose Hill Gymnasium (1,627); Bronx, NY
February 9, 2024; 7:00 p.m., ESPN2		No. 18 Dayton	W 49–47	16–8 (8–3)	11 – Nelson	8 – Bairstow	5 – Shulga	Siegel Center (7,637); Richmond, VA
February 16, 2024; 7:00 p.m., ESPN2		at Saint Louis	W 95–85	17–8 (9–3)	27 – Bamisile	10 – Lawal	5 – Bairstow	Chaifetz Arena (5,382); St. Louis, MO
February 20, 2024; 7:00 p.m., CBSSN		at UMass	L 52–74	17–9 (9–4)	13 – Bamisile	8 – Bairstow	6 – Bairstow	Mullins Center (4,313); Amherst, MA
February 25, 2024; 4:00 p.m., CBSSN		Saint Joseph's	W 73–69	18–9 (10–4)	16 – Tied	10 – Lawal	6 – Bairstow	Siegel Center (7,637); Richmond, VA
February 28, 2024; 6:30 p.m., CBSSN		Rhode Island	W 88–67	19–9 (11–4)	24 – Bamisile	8 – Lawal	5 – Jackson	Siegel Center (7,107); Richmond, VA
March 2, 2024; 6:00 p.m., CBSSN		at Richmond; Capital City Classic	L 76–79	19–10 (11–5)	19 – Shulga	6 – Jackson	5 – Bairstow	Robins Center (7,201); Richmond, VA
March 5, 2024; 7:00 p.m., MASN/ESPN+		Duquesne	L 59–69	19–11 (11–6)	18 – Bamisile	5 – Tied	5 – Nelson	Siegel Center (7,044); Richmond, VA
March 8, 2024; 7:00 p.m., ESPN2		at No. 25 Dayton	L 86–91 ^{OT}	19–12 (11–7)	26 – Jackson	6 – Shulga	5 – Shulga	UD Arena (13,407); Dayton, OH
A-10 tournament
March 13, 2024; 2:00 p.m., USA	(5)	vs. (12) Fordham; Second Round	W 69–62	20–12	14 – Shulga	7 – Shulga	4 – Shulga	Barclays Center (7,725); Brooklyn, NY
March 14, 2024; 2:00 p.m., USA	(5)	vs. (4) UMass; Quarterfinals	W 73–59	21–12	18 – Bamisile	6 – Tied	7 – Shulga	Barclays Center (6,817); Brooklyn, NY
March 16, 2024; 1:00 p.m., CBSSN	(5)	vs. (9) Saint Joseph's; Semifinals	W 66–60	22–12	25 – Shulga	8 – Jackson	3 – Shulga	Barclays Center; Brooklyn, NY
March 17, 2024; 1:00 p.m., CBS	(5)	vs. (6) Duquesne; Championship	L 51–57	22–13	20 – Bamisile	9 – Lawal	2 – Tied	Barclays Center; Brooklyn, NY
NIT
March 20, 2024*; 9:00 p.m., ESPN2		at (1) Villanova; First Round - Villanova Bracket	W 70–61	23–13	17 – Bamisile	10 – Lawal	6 – Shulga	Finneran Pavilion (1,763); Villanova, PA
March 24, 2024*; 7:30 p.m., ESPNU		at South Florida; Second Round - Villanova Bracket	W 70–65	24–13	14 – Jackson	6 – Bairstow	4 – Bairstow	Yuengling Center (6,398); Tampa, FL
March 27, 2024*; 9:00 p.m., ESPN2		at (2) Utah; Quarterfinals - Villanova Bracket	L 54–74	24–14	13 – Bairstow	9 – Fermin	2 – Bamisile	Jon M. Huntsman Center (6,008); Salt Lake City, UT
*Non-conference game. ^{#}Rankings from AP Poll. (#) Tournament seedings in parentheses. All times are in Eastern Time.

== See also ==
- 2023–24 VCU Rams women's basketball team
