= 2023–24 George Mason Patriots men's basketball team =

American college basketball season

2023–24 George Mason Patriots men's basketball
- Conference: Atlantic 10 Conference
- Record: 20–12 (9–9 A–10)
- Head coach: Tony Skinn (1st season)
- Assistant coaches: Steve Curran; Louis Hinnant; Mike Ekanem
- Home arena: EagleBank Arena

2023–24 Atlantic 10 men's basketball standings
	Conf.				Overall
Team	W		L	PCT	W		L	PCT
Richmond	15	–	3	.833	23	–	10	.697
Loyola Chicago	15	–	3	.833	23	–	10	.697
No. 24 Dayton	14	–	4	.778	25	–	8	.758
UMass	11	–	7	.611	20	–	11	.645
VCU	11	–	7	.611	24	–	14	.632
Duquesne †	10	–	8	.556	25	–	12	.676
St. Bonaventure	9	–	9	.500	20	–	13	.606
George Mason	9	–	9	.500	20	–	12	.625
Saint Joseph's	9	–	9	.500	21	–	14	.600
La Salle	6	–	12	.333	16	–	17	.485
Rhode Island	6	–	12	.333	12	–	20	.375
Fordham	6	–	12	.333	13	–	20	.394
Davidson	5	–	13	.278	15	–	17	.469
Saint Louis	5	–	13	.278	13	–	20	.394
George Washington	4	–	14	.222	15	–	17	.469
† 2024 A-10 tournament winner Rankings from AP poll

The 2023–24 George Mason Patriots Men's basketball team represented George Mason University during the 2023–24 NCAA Division I men's basketball season. The season was the 58th for the program, the first under newly hired head coach Tony Skinn, and the eleventh as members of the Atlantic 10 Conference (A-10). The Patriots played their home games at EagleBank Arena in Fairfax, Virginia.

== Previous season ==
The Patriots finished the previous season 20–13, 11–7 in A-10 play, to finish in fifth place. This was the first season since 2017 that the Patriots finished the season with at least 20 wins. They defeated Richmond in the second round of the A-10 tournament before losing to Saint Louis.

On March 23, 2023, head coach Kim English left the school to take the head coaching job at Providence. On March 30, the school named Maryland assistant coach Tony Skinn the team's new head coach.

== Offseason ==
=== Departures ===
Name	Number	Pos.	Height	Weight	Year	Hometown	Notes
Victor Bailey	2	G	6'4"	182	Graduate senior	Austin, TX	Graduated
Devon Cooper	0	G	6'4"	201	Graduate senior	Louisville, KY	Graduated
Justyn Fernandez	4	G	6'5"	200	Freshman	Richmond, VA	Transferred to Providence
Davonte Gaines	3	G	6'7"	175	Senior	Buffalo, NY	Transferred to Providence
Blake Jones	24	F	6'10"	222	Sophomore	Canberra, Australia	Transferred to Montana
Peter Oduro	12	F	6'7"	224	Freshman	Gainesville, VA	Transferred to Odessa College
Josh Oduro	13	F	6'9"	235	Senior	Gainesville, VA	Transferred to Providence
Ginika Ojaiko	20	F	6'10"	240	Graduate senior	Lagos, Nigeria	Transferred to Coastal Carolina
Elvis Nnaji	23	F	6'7"	222	Freshman	Hopkins, MN	Transferred to Grambling State

=== Arrivals ===
Name	Number	Pos.	Height	Weight	Year	Hometown	Notes
Berke Arslan	25	G	6'3"		Freshman	Istanbul, Turkey	
Austin Ball	24	G	6'7"		Freshman	Man, WV	
Jared Billups	0	G	6'4"	189	Junior	Waldorf, MD	Transferred from Siena
Keyshawn Hall	4	G/F	6'7"	250	Sophomore	Cleveland, OH	Transferred from UNLV
Jalen Hayes	11	F	6'8"	200	Junior	Fort Lauderdale, FL	Transferred from East Tennessee State
Amari Kelly	23	F/C	6'9"	225	Graduate senior	Norcross, GA	Transferred from UNC Wilmington
Darrius Maddox	13	G	6'5"	185	Senior	Bowie, MD	Transferred from Virginia Tech
Woody Newton	2	G/F	6'9"	195	Junior	District Heights, MD	Transferred from Oklahoma State
Baraka Okojie	3	G	6'3"		Freshman	Brampton, ON	
Nicolas Pavrette	22	F/C	6'11"	210	Junior	Lyon, France	Transferred from Central Michigan
Tre' Wood	8	G	6'1"	170	Graduate Senior	Largo, MD	Transferred from Long Island University

== Honors and awards ==
Atlantic 10 Player of the Week

- Keyshawn Hall – November 20

Atlantic 10 Rookie of the Week

- Baraka Okojie – January 29

== Roster ==
2023–24 George Mason Patriots men's basketball team
Players
Coaches

Pos.	#	Name	Height	Weight	Year	Previous school	Hometown
G	0	Jared Billups	6 ft 4 in (1.93 m)	195 lb (88 kg)	Jr	Siena	Waldorf, MD
G	1	Ronald Polite III	6 ft 2 in (1.88 m)	185 lb (84 kg)	Sr	Oxon Hill High School	Temple Hills, MD
G/F	2	Woody Newton	6 ft 9 in (2.06 m)	200 lb (91 kg)	Sr	Oklahoma State	District Heights, MD
G	3	Baraka Okojie	6 ft 3 in (1.91 m)	175 lb (79 kg)	Fr	DME Academy	Brampton, ON
G/F	4	Keyshawn Hall	6 ft 7 in (2.01 m)	230 lb (104 kg)	So	UNLV	Cleveland, OH
G	5	Devin Dinkins (injured)	5 ft 10 in (1.78 m)	165 lb (75 kg)	So	Gonzaga High School	Washington, D.C.
G	7	Andrei O.'Grady-Cook (injured)	5 ft 10 in (1.78 m)	175 lb (79 kg)	So	Commonwealth Academy	Alexandria, VA
G	8	Tre' Wood	6 ft 1 in (1.85 m)	175 lb (79 kg)	GS	LIU	Largo, MD
G	9	Kam Johnson	5 ft 11 in (1.8 m)	175 lb (79 kg)	Jr	Charles City County High School	Charles City, VA
F	11	Jalen Haynes	6 ft 8 in (2.03 m)	260 lb (118 kg)	Jr	East Tennessee State	Fort Lauderdale, FL
G	13	Darius Maddox	6 ft 5 in (1.96 m)	175 lb (79 kg)	Sr	Virginia Tech	Bowie, MD
F/C	23	Amari Kelly	6 ft 9 in (2.06 m)	225 lb (102 kg)	GS	UNC Wilmington	Norcross, GA
G	24	Austin Ball	6 ft 7 in (2.01 m)	200 lb (91 kg)	Fr	The Miller School	Man, WV
G	25	Berke Arslan	6 ft 3 in (1.91 m)	190 lb (86 kg)	Fr	Montverde Academy	Istanbul, Turkey
G	30	Chase Tucker (W)	6 ft 1 in (1.85 m)	180 lb (82 kg)	Jr	Mount Pisgah Christian School	Alpharetta, GA
F	35	Malik Henry	6 ft 8 in (2.03 m)	230 lb (104 kg)	Sr	Longview High School	Longview, TX

Head coach

- Tony Skinn (George Mason)

Assistant coach(es)

- Steve Curran (Merrimack)
- Louis Hinnant (Boston College)
- Mike Ekanem (Texas Lutheran)

Legend

- (C) Team captain
- (S) Suspended
- (I) Ineligible
- (W) Walk-on
- Injured
- Current redshirt

Roster
Last update: December 10, 2023

== Player statistics ==
Player	GP	GS	MPG	FG%	3FG%	FT%	RPG	APG	SPG	BPG	PPG
Keyshawn Hall	29	28	30.7	.474	.357	.844	8.1	1.4	0.4	0.3	16.6
Darius Maddox	29	27	33.9	.443	.414	.857	3.4	1.8	0.6	0.3	14.0
Amari Kelly	31	31	28.5	.549	.424	.760	6.3	1.1	0.5	1.3	12.2
Baraka Okojie	32	10	24.5	.468	.256	.728	2.8	2.4	1.4	0.1	8.1
Ronald Polite III	30	27	25.0	.405	.297	.846	2.1	2.7	0.8	0.2	7.5
Woody Newton	32	5	18.4	.387	.282	.609	3.9	0.4	0.6	0.7	5.8
Jared Billups	32	32	25.5	.413	.229	.621	4.3	1.2	0.9	0.2	4.3
Malik Henry	28	0	10.1	.643	.000	.417	2.0	0.1	0.2	0.4	2.9
Austin Ball	23	0	9.7	.418	.323	.500	1.0	0.5	0.2	0.0	2.5
Andrei O'Grady-Cook	3	0	8.7	.407	.320	.833	0.7	0.7	0.3	0.3	2.3
Kam Johnson	6	0	2.8	.625	.333	.500	0.7	0.0	0.0	0.0	2.0
Tre' Wood	22	0	7.3	.419	.333	.500	0.7	0.5	0.1	0.0	2.0
Chase Tucker	6	0	1.5	.000	.000	.500	0.2	0.2	0.0	0.0	0.2
Berke Arslan	4	0	1.5	.000	.000	.000	0.3	0.0	0.0	0.0	0.0

== Schedule and results ==
Date time, TV	Rank^{#}	Opponent^{#}	Result	Record	High points	High rebounds	High assists	Site (attendance) city, state
Exhibition
October 23, 2023*; 7:00 p.m.		St. Thomas (FL)	W 64–52	-	13 – Maddox	9 – Hall	2 – tied	EagleBank Arena (1,837); Fairfax, VA
October 27, 2023*; 7:00 p.m., ESPN+		at West Virginia	L 78–85	-	18 – Maddox	6 – Newton	3 – Okojie	WVU Coliseum (9,437); Morgantown, WV
Non-conference regular season
November 6, 2023*; 7:00 p.m., ESPN+		Monmouth	W 72–61	1–0	17 – tied	10 – Hall	5 – Polite III	EagleBank Arena (3,145); Fairfax, VA
November 10, 2023*; 7:00 p.m., ESPN+		Austin Peay	W 67–45	2–0	14 – Hall	10 – Hall	2 – Billups	EagleBank Arena (4,295); Fairfax, VA
November 15, 2023*; 7:30 p.m., ESPN+		Cornell; Jacksonville Classic campus site game	W 90–83	3–0	29 – Hall	12 – Hall	3 – Hall	EagleBank Arena (2,976); Fairfax, VA
November 19, 2023*; 5:30 p.m.		vs. Charlotte; Jacksonville Classic Coast Semifinals	L 49–54	3–1	18 – Hall	8 – Hall	2 – O'Grady- Cook	UNF Arena (351); Jacksonville, FL
November 20, 2023*; 6:00 p.m.		vs. South Dakota State; Jacksonville Classic Coast Consolation	W 73–71	4–1	21 – Hall	15 – Hall	4 – tied	UNF Arena (425); Jacksonville, FL
November 25, 2023*; 2:00 p.m., ESPN+		East Carolina	W 81–59	5–1	19 – Maddox	10 – Hall	5 – Kelly	EagleBank Arena (3,268); Fairfax, VA
November 29, 2023*; 7:00 p.m., ESPN+		NJIT	W 86–68	6–1	18 – Polite III	11 – Kelly	6 – Polite III	EagleBank Arena (2,443); Fairfax, VA
December 2, 2023*; 7:00 p.m., ESPN+		at Toledo	W 86–77	7–1	24 – Kelly	10 – Kelly	4 – Maddox	Savage Arena (3,907); Toledo, OH
December 5, 2023*; 6:30 p.m., SECN+/ESPN+		at No. 17 Tennessee	L 66–87	7–2	15 – Maddox	6 – Hall	3 – tied	Thompson–Boling Arena (16,513); Knoxville, TN
December 16, 2023*; 6:00 p.m., ESPN+		Loyola (MD)	W 62–54	8–2	17 – Hall	13 – Hall	3 – Okojie	EagleBank Arena (2,780); Fairfax, VA
December 19, 2023*; 7:00 p.m., ESPN+		Bridgewater	W 84–60	9–2	36 – Hall	12 – Hall	3 – Ball	EagleBank Arena (2,427); Fairfax, VA
December 22, 2023*; 2:00 p.m., ESPN+		at Tulane	W 69–66	10–2	16 – tied	11 – Hall	6 – Polite III	Devlin Fieldhouse (1,645); New Orleans, LA
December 30, 2023*; 2:00 p.m., ESPN+		North Carolina A&T	W 94–69	11–2	18 – Hall	7 – Hall	4 – Polite III	EagleBank Arena (4,554); Fairfax, VA
A-10 regular season
January 3, 2024; 6:30 p.m., ESPN+		at La Salle	W 77–62	12–2 (1–0)	27 – Hall	13 – Hall	4 – Polite III	Tom Gola Arena (1,243); Philadelphia, PA
January 6, 2024; 2:00 p.m., USA		Saint Louis	W 79–67	13–2 (2–0)	22 – Hall	8 – Hall	3 – Polite III	EagleBank Arena (3,456); Fairfax, VA
January 9, 2024; 7:00 p.m., ESPN+		VCU; Rivalry	L 50–54	13–3 (2–1)	14 – Hall	7 – Kelly	2 – Maddox	EagleBank Arena (4,000); Fairfax, VA
January 13, 2024; 6:00 p.m., ESPN+		at Richmond	L 70–77	13–4 (2–2)	18 – Maddox	9 – Hall	6 – Polite III	Robins Center (6,275); Richmond, VA
January 15, 2024; 2:00 p.m., CBSSN		at George Washington; Revolutionary Rivalry	L 62–75	13–5 (2–3)	19 – Hall	9 – Hall	4 – Polite III	Charles E. Smith Center (2,585); Washington, D.C.
January 20, 2024; 2:00 p.m., ESPN+		St. Bonaventure	W 69–60	14–5 (3–3)	13 – tied	8 – Hall	4 – Okojie	EagleBank Arena (4,614); Fairfax, VA
January 27, 2024; 4:00 p.m., ESPN+		Rhode Island; Homecoming	W 92–84	15–5 (4–3)	24 – Maddox	12 – Billups	4 – Hall	EagleBank Arena (6,756); Fairfax, VA
January 31, 2024; 7:00 p.m., ESPN+		at Saint Joseph's	L 73–75	15–6 (4–4)	19 – Hall	8 – tied	6 – Okojie	Hagan Arena (1,844); Philadelphia, PA
February 3, 2024; 12:00 p.m., ESPN+		at UMass	L 65–66	15–7 (4–5)	23 – Hall	6 – Newton	4 – Okojie	Mullins Center (4,418); Amherst, MA
February 7, 2024; 7:00 p.m., ESPN+		Loyola Chicago	L 79–85	15–8 (4–6)	20 – Hall	8 – Hall	3 – tied	EagleBank Arena (2,645); Fairfax, VA
February 10, 2024; 2:30 p.m., USA		at Davidson	W 57–55	16–8 (5–6)	25 – Hall	8 – Henry	3 – Okojie	John M. Belk Arena (3,609); Davidson, NC
February 13, 2024; 7:00 p.m., ESPN+		George Washington; Revolutionary Rivalry	W 90–67	17–8 (6–6)	20 – Hall	12 – Hall	4 – tied	EagleBank Arena (3,390); Fairfax, VA
February 21, 2024; 7:00 p.m., ESPN+		No. 16 Dayton	W 71–67	18–8 (7–6)	19 – Okojie	6 – Hall	4 – Maddox	EagleBank Arena (5,286); Fairfax, VA
February 24, 2024; 4:30 p.m., USA		at Loyola Chicago	L 59–80	18–9 (7–7)	19 – Kelly	7 – Hall	3 – tied	Joseph J. Gentile Arena (4,557); Chicago, IL
February 27, 2024; 7:00 p.m., ESPN+		at Fordham	L 60–61	18–10 (7–8)	15 – Hall	8 – Kelly	4 – tied	Rose Hill Gymnasium (1,246); The Bronx, NY
March 2, 2024; 2:00 p.m., ESPN+		Duquesne	L 51–59	18–11 (7–9)	22 – Maddox	10 – Kelly	6 – Okojie	EagleBank Arena (5,508); Fairfax, VA
March 6, 2024; 7:00 p.m., ESPN+		at Rhode Island	W 69–51	19–11 (8–9)	21 – Maddox	9 – Newton	4 – Okojie	Ryan Center (3,139); Kingston, RI
March 9, 2024; 2:30 p.m., ESPN+		Richmond	W 64–46	20–11 (9–9)	18 – Maddox	11 – Newton	5 – Okojie	EagleBank Arena (5,576); Fairfax, VA
A-10 tournament
March 13, 2024; 11:30 a.m., USA	(8)	vs. (9) Saint Joseph's; Second round	L 57–64	20–12	22 – Okojie	10 – Newton	3 – Okojie	Barclays Center; Brooklyn, NY
*Non-conference game. ^{#}Rankings from AP poll. (#) Tournament seedings in parentheses. All times are in Eastern Time.
