= 2023–24 Richmond Spiders men's basketball team =

2023–24 Richmond Spiders men's basketball

2023–24 Richmond Spiders men's basketball

Atlantic 10 regular-season co-champions

NIT, first round
- Conference: Atlantic 10 Conference
- Record: 23–10 (15–3 A-10)
- Head coach: Chris Mooney (19th season)
- Associate head coach: Peter Thomas
- Assistant coaches: David Boyden; Will Gipe; Mark McGonigal; Jack Fahed
- Home arena: Robins Center

2023–24 Atlantic 10 men's basketball standings
	Conf.				Overall
Team	W		L	PCT	W		L	PCT
Richmond	15	–	3	.833	23	–	10	.697
Loyola Chicago	15	–	3	.833	23	–	10	.697
No. 24 Dayton	14	–	4	.778	25	–	8	.758
UMass	11	–	7	.611	20	–	11	.645
VCU	11	–	7	.611	24	–	14	.632
Duquesne †	10	–	8	.556	25	–	12	.676
St. Bonaventure	9	–	9	.500	20	–	13	.606
George Mason	9	–	9	.500	20	–	12	.625
Saint Joseph's	9	–	9	.500	21	–	14	.600
La Salle	6	–	12	.333	16	–	17	.485
Rhode Island	6	–	12	.333	12	–	20	.375
Fordham	6	–	12	.333	13	–	20	.394
Davidson	5	–	13	.278	15	–	17	.469
Saint Louis	5	–	13	.278	13	–	20	.394
George Washington	4	–	14	.222	15	–	17	.469
† 2024 A-10 tournament winner Rankings from AP poll

The 2023–24 Richmond Spiders men's basketball team represented the University of Richmond during the 2023–24 NCAA Division I men's basketball season. They were led by 19th-year head coach Chris Mooney and played their home games at the Robins Center in Richmond, Virginia as members of the Atlantic 10 Conference.

Richmond secured the Atlantic 10 Conference regular-season championship with a 73–66 win over Saint Joseph's on March 6, 2024.

Mooney returned to the team as head coach after missing the final six games of the 2022–23 season due to heart surgery to address an aneurysm in his ascending aorta. Assistant coach and former Richmond player Peter Thomas served as interim head coach in Mooney's absence, and Mooney returned to his position after the conclusion of the season.

== Previous season ==
The Spiders finished the 2022–23 season 15–18, 7–11 in Atlantic 10 play, to finish in 11th place. The Spiders defeated UMass in the first round of the A-10 tournament before losing to George Mason to end their season.

== Offseason ==
=== Departures ===
Name	Number	Pos.	Height	Weight	Year	Hometown	Reason for departure
Jason Nelson	1	G	5' 10"	175	Redshirt freshman	Richmond, VA	Transferred to VCU
Marcus Randolph	2	G	6' 5"	195	Sophomore	Willingboro, NJ	Transferred to Saint Peter's
Tyler Burton	3	F	6' 7"	215	Senior	Uxbridge, MA	Graduated and transferred to Villanova
Connor Crabtree	5	G	6' 6"	200	Graduate student	Hillsborough, NC	Graduated
Malcolm Dread	12	G	6' 4"	210	Redshirt freshman	Detroit, MI	Transferred to Mount St. Mary's
Matt Grace	15	F	6' 9"	230	Graduate student	Hamilton, ON	Graduated
Andre Gustavson	22	G	6' 5"	205	Graduate student	Helsinki, Finland	Graduated
Gabe Arizin	34	G	6'4"	190	Senior	West Chester, PA	Walk-on; graduated

=== 2023 recruiting class ===
College recruiting information
Name	Hometown	School	Height	Weight	Commit date
Trevor Smith; G	Newport News, VA	Woodside High School	6 ft 0 in (1.83 m)	165 lb (75 kg)	Apr 26, 2022
Trevor Smith; G	Recruit ratings: Rivals: 247Sports: (3)				
Collin Tanner; G	Creedmoor, NC	Combine Academy	6 ft 6 in (1.98 m)	195 lb (88 kg)	Aug 28, 2022
Collin Tanner; G	Recruit ratings: Rivals: 247Sports: (NR)				
Mikkel Tyne; G	Toronto, ON	Bishop Walsh School (MD)	5 ft 10 in (1.78 m)	180 lb (82 kg)	Jun 9, 2023
Mikkel Tyne; G	Recruit ratings: Rivals: 247Sports: (NR)				
Ryan Soulis; F	Athens, Greece	Asheville School (NC)	6 ft 10 in (2.08 m)	215 lb (98 kg)	Jul 23, 2023
Ryan Soulis; F	Recruit ratings: Rivals: 247Sports: (NR)				
Overall recruit ranking:
Note: In many cases, Scout, Rivals, 247Sports, On3, and ESPN may conflict in their listings of height and weight.; In these cases, the average was taken. ESPN grades are on a 100-point scale.; Sources: "Rivals.com 2023 Richmond Commitments". Rivals.; "ESPN 2023 Richmond Commitments". ESPN.; "2023 Team Ranking". Rivals.

=== Incoming transfers ===
In addition to the four scholarship freshmen and walk-on freshman Jack Graham, Richmond also brought in three new players via transfer: DeLonnie Hunt from Wagner, Jordan King from East Tennessee State, and Tyler Harris from Western Carolina.

=== Coaching staff changes ===
In June 2023, assistant coach Peter Thomas was elevated to the role of associate head coach. Thomas had served as interim head coach for the final few weeks of the 2022–23 season with head coach Chris Mooney on leave due to heart surgery.

Under a new NCAA rule permitting two additional staff members to be designated as assistant coaches without being able to participate in off-campus recruiting, Mark McGonigal and Jack Fahed were elevated from their previous staff roles in September 2023.

== Preseason ==
In a preseason poll of league head coaches and select media members, Richmond was chosen to finish 11th out of 15 teams in the Atlantic 10 Conference in 2023–24. Neal Quinn was selected to the Preseason All-Conference Third Team.

== Roster ==
2023–24 Richmond Spiders men's basketball team
Players
Coaches

Pos.	#	Name	Height	Weight	Year	Previous school	Hometown
G	1	Trevor Smith	6 ft 0 in (1.83 m)	165 lb (75 kg)	Fr	Woodside High School	Newport News, VA
G	2	Jordan King	6 ft 0 in (1.83 m)	175 lb (79 kg)	GS	Christian Brothers Academy; East Tennessee State	Albany, NY
G	3	DeLonnie Hunt	6 ft 0 in (1.83 m)	175 lb (79 kg)	Sr	Rock Creek Christian Academy; Wagner	Upper Marlboro, MD
G	4	Dji Bailey	6 ft 5 in (1.96 m)	195 lb (88 kg)	Sr	Greenfield School	Wilson, NC
G	5	Collin Tanner	6 ft 6 in (1.98 m)	195 lb (88 kg)	Fr	Combine Academy	Creedmoor, NC
F	9	Tyler Harris	6 ft 7 in (2.01 m)	205 lb (93 kg)	GS	Independence High School; Western Carolina	Charlotte, NC
G	10	Liam Weaver (W)	6 ft 2 in (1.88 m)	190 lb (86 kg)	Jr	Pembroke Hill School	Kansas City, MO
G	11	Jason Roche	6 ft 5 in (1.96 m)	200 lb (91 kg)	Jr	Saint Mary's College High School	Berkeley, CA
G	12	Mikkel Tyne	5 ft 10 in (1.78 m)	180 lb (82 kg)	Fr	Bishop Walsh School	Toronto, ON
G	13	Jack Graham (W)	6 ft 3 in (1.91 m)	185 lb (84 kg)	Fr	Milton Academy	Smithfield, RI
F	16	Ryan Soulis	6 ft 10 in (2.08 m)	215 lb (98 kg)	Fr	Asheville School	Athens, Greece
C	21	Mike Walz	6 ft 11 in (2.11 m)	250 lb (113 kg)	So	Conestoga High School	Berwyn, PA
F	24	Isaiah Bigelow	6 ft 7 in (2.01 m)	205 lb (93 kg)	GS	Ben L. Smith High School; Wofford	Greensboro, NC
G	25	Quentin Southall (W)	6 ft 3 in (1.91 m)	195 lb (88 kg)	Sr	Georgetown Prep	Alexandria, VA
C	32	Neal Quinn	7 ft 0 in (2.13 m)	260 lb (118 kg)	GS	Ramapo High School	Allendale, NJ
F	35	Aidan Noyes	6 ft 7 in (2.01 m)	195 lb (88 kg)	RS So	Moeller High School	Cincinnati, OH

Head coach

- Chris Mooney (Princeton)

Assistant coach(es)

- Peter Thomas (Richmond)
- David Boyden (Western Kentucky)
- Will Gipe (Virginia Tech)
- Mark McGonigal (Richmond)
- Jack Fahed (James Madison)

Legend

- (C) Team captain
- (S) Suspended
- (I) Ineligible
- (W) Walk-on
- Injured
- Current redshirt

Roster
Last update: September 15, 2023

== Schedule and results ==
Richmond announced a 13-game non-conference schedule on August 25, 2023, followed by its 18-game Atlantic 10 schedule on September 6, 2023. The non-conference schedule began on November 6 with a home game against VMI and concluded with a December 30 home game against Lafayette. Richmond's Atlantic 10 schedule began on January 6, 2024, and saw the Spiders facing VCU, Davidson, George Mason, and George Washington twice each and all other conference teams once each.

Date time, TV	Rank^{#}	Opponent^{#}	Result	Record	High points	High rebounds	High assists	Site (attendance) city, state
Non-conference regular season
November 6, 2023*; 7:00 p.m., MASN2/ESPN+		VMI	W 93–75	1–0	34 – King	10 – Quinn	7 – Quinn	Robins Center (5,176); Richmond, VA
November 11, 2023*; 8:00 p.m., ESPN+		Siena; Sunshine Slam campus game	W 90–48	2–0	17 – Bigelow	5 – Walz	4 – tied	Robins Center (4,543); Richmond, VA
November 15, 2023*; 7:00 p.m., ACCNX/ESPN+		at Boston College	L 61–68	2–1	21 – Quinn	6 – tied	5 – Quinn	Conte Forum (3,886); Boston, MA
November 20, 2023*; 8:00 p.m., CBSSN		vs. No. 18 Colorado; Sunshine Slam Beach Bracket semifinals	L 59–64	2–2	23 – King	6 – King	2 – Tyne	Ocean Center (2,153); Daytona Beach, FL
November 21, 2023*; 6:30 p.m., FloHoops		vs. UNLV; Sunshine Slam Beach Bracket consolation game	W 82–65	3–2	21 – King	7 – tied	7 – Bailey	Ocean Center; Daytona Beach, FL
November 25, 2023*; 7:00 p.m., MASN/ESPN+		Queens	W 90–61	4–2	24 – King	9 – Bigelow	4 – Tyne	Robins Center (4,953); Richmond, VA
November 29, 2023*; 7:30 p.m., ESPN+		at Wichita State	L 68–80	4–3	18 – Quinn	8 – Bailey	5 – Bailey	Charles Koch Arena (6,195); Wichita, KS
December 2, 2023*; 6:00 p.m., Monumental/ESPN+		William & Mary	W 88–69	5–3	29 – King	8 – tied	5 – Quinn	Robins Center (5,542); Richmond, VA
December 6, 2023*; 8:00 p.m., ESPN+		at Northern Iowa	L 73–78	5–4	20 – King	8 – Quinn	3 – Bailey	McLeod Center (3,153); Cedar Falls, IA
December 9, 2023*; 4:00 p.m., SECN		vs. Florida; Orange Bowl Basketball Classic	L 76–87	5–5	17 – tied	7 – Bigelow	6 – tied	Amerant Bank Arena (8,162); Sunrise, FL
December 16, 2023*; 7:00 p.m., MASN/ESPN+		Charlotte	W 64–56	6–5	14 – King	9 – Bigelow	3 – tied	Robins Center (5,222); Richmond, VA
December 21, 2023*; 7:00 p.m., MASN/ESPN+		Buffalo	W 72–66	7–5	23 – Quinn	12 – Bigelow	4 – tied	Robins Center (4,897); Richmond, VA
December 30, 2023*; 4:00 p.m., Monumental/ESPN+		Lafayette	W 59–38	8–5	14 – Bigelow	10 – Bigelow	5 – King	Robins Center (5,484); Richmond, VA
A-10 regular season
January 6, 2024; 4:00 p.m., Monumental/ESPN+		St. Bonaventure	W 65–54	9–5 (1–0)	18 – King	13 – Bigelow	4 – Quinn	Robins Center (6,619); Richmond, VA
January 9, 2024; 8:00 p.m., ESPN+		at Loyola Chicago	W 58–56	10–5 (2–0)	16 – King	7 – Quinn	4 – Quinn	Joseph J. Gentile Arena (1,834); Chicago, IL
January 13, 2024; 6:00 p.m., MASN/ESPN+		George Mason	W 77–70	11–5 (3–0)	31 – King	8 – Bigelow	2 – Quinn	Robins Center (6,275); Richmond, VA
January 16, 2024; 7:00 p.m., ESPN+		at Duquesne	W 63–61	12–5 (4–0)	16 – Quinn	8 – tied	4 – tied	UPMC Cooper Fieldhouse (2,463); Pittsburgh, PA
January 20, 2024; 4:00 p.m., ESPN+		at Davidson	W 69–64 ^{OT}	13–5 (5–0)	24 – King	13 – Bigelow	4 – Hunt	John M. Belk Arena (4,235); Davidson, NC
January 24, 2024; 7:00 p.m., NBC Sports App		George Washington	W 82–74	14–5 (6–0)	32 – King	9 – Quinn	4 – Quinn	Robins Center (5,082); Richmond, VA
January 27, 2024; 6:00 p.m., CBSSN		No. 16 Dayton	W 69–64	15–5 (7–0)	17 – King	15 – Bigelow	4 – Quinn	Robins Center (7,201); Richmond, VA
January 31, 2024; 7:00 p.m., SNY/ESPN+		at Fordham	W 83–69	16–5 (8–0)	29 – King	9 – Bigelow	6 – Quinn	Rose Hill Gymnasium (1,860); New York, NY
February 3, 2024; 4:00 p.m., ESPNU/ESPN+		at VCU; Capital City Classic	L 52–63	16–6 (8–1)	12 – tied	9 – Quinn	6 – Quinn	Siegel Center (7,637); Richmond, VA
February 10, 2024; 2:00 p.m., Monumental/ESPN+		La Salle	W 82–65	17–6 (9–1)	22 – Bailey	7 – Bailey	5 – King	Robins Center (7,201); Richmond, VA
February 14, 2024; 7:00 p.m., MASN/ESPN+		UMass	L 59–69	17–7 (9–2)	11 – King	7 – Bailey	2 – tied	Robins Center (4,797); Richmond, VA
February 17, 2024; 12:30 p.m., USA		at George Washington	W 90–74	18–7 (10–2)	24 – King	9 – Bigelow	7 – Quinn	Charles E. Smith Center (2,233); Washington, D.C.
February 21, 2024; 7:00 p.m., ESPN+		at Rhode Island	W 85–77	19–7 (11–2)	25 – King	6 – Bailey	7 – tied	Ryan Center (4,252); Kingston, RI
February 24, 2024; 6:00 p.m., MASN/ESPN+		Davidson	W 66–63	20–7 (12–2)	15 – King	7 – Bailey	5 – Bailey	Robins Center (7,201); Richmond, VA
February 28, 2024; 8:00 p.m., ESPN+		at Saint Louis	W 80–64	21–7 (13–2)	27 – King	9 – Bailey	7 – Quinn	Chaifetz Arena (5,359); St. Louis, MO
March 2, 2024; 6:00 p.m., CBSSN		VCU; Capital City Classic	W 79–76	22–7 (14–2)	27 – King	9 – Quinn	3 – tied	Robins Center (7,201); Richmond, VA
March 6, 2024; 7:00 p.m., MASN/ESPN+		Saint Joseph's	W 73–66	23–7 (15–2)	21 – Quinn	6 – Bigelow	4 – Quinn	Robins Center (5,942); Richmond, VA
March 9, 2024; 2:30 p.m., USA		at George Mason	L 46–64	23–8 (15–3)	11 – tied	4 – tied	2 – tied	EagleBank Arena (5,576); Fairfax, VA
A-10 tournament
March 14, 2024; 11:30 a.m., USA	(1)	vs. (9) Saint Joseph's; Quarterfinals	L 61–66	23–9	21 – Quinn	11 – Bigelow	4 – tied	Barclays Center (6,817); Brooklyn, NY
NIT
March 19, 2024; 9:00 p.m., ESPN2		at (3) Virginia Tech; First round – Wake Forest Bracket	L 58–74	23–10	15 – tied	7 – Bigelow	4 – King	Cassell Coliseum (3,183); Blacksburg, VA
*Non-conference game. ^{#}Rankings from AP poll. (#) Tournament seedings in parentheses. All times are in Eastern.

== Rankings ==
Ranking movements Legend: ██ Increase in ranking ██ Decrease in ranking — = Not ranked RV = Received votes
	Week																				
Poll	Pre	1	2	3	4	5	6	7	8	9	10	11	12	13	14	15	16	17	18	19	Final
AP	—	—	—	—	—	—	—	—	—	—	—	—	RV	—	—	—	—	RV	—	—	—
Coaches	—	—	—	—	—	—	—	—	—	—	—	—	—	—	RV	—	—	—	—	—	—
