= Jordan King (basketball) =

American basketball player (born 2001)

No. 2 – Le Mans
- Position: Point guard
- League: LNB Élite; EuroCup

Personal information
- Born: March 2, 2001 (age 25) Albany, New York, U.S.
- Listed height: 6 ft 0 in (1.83 m)
- Listed weight: 175 lb (79 kg)

Career information
- High school: Christian Brothers Academy (Albany, New York)
- College: Siena (2019–2021); East Tennessee State (2021–2023); Richmond (2023–2024)
- NBA draft: 2024: undrafted
- Playing career: 2024–present

Career history
- 2024–2025: Lucentum Alicante
- 2025–2026: Maroussi
- 2026–present: Le Mans

Career highlights
- Atlantic 10 co-Player of the Year (2024); First-team All-Atlantic 10 (2024); 2× Third-team All-SoCon (2022, 2023)

Jordan James King (born March 2, 2001) is an American basketball player for Le Mans of the LNB Élite and the EuroCup. He played college basketball for the Siena Saints, East Tennessee State Buccaneers and Richmond Spiders.

== High school career ==
King attended Christian Brothers Academy in Albany, New York. As a senior, he averaged over 24 points per game, before committing to play college basketball at Siena College.

== College career ==
As a freshman at Siena, King appeared in 30 games, averaging 4.7 points per game. His production increased the following season, as he averaged 12.2 points per game, before entering the transfer portal.

On June 9, 2021, King announced that he would be transferring to East Tennessee State University to play for the East Tennessee State Buccaneers. In his first season with East Tennessee State, he averaged 14.6 points per game while shooting 42.9% from three-point range. The following season, in a game against The Citadel in January 2023, King scored a career-high 42 points in a 96–74 rout. He finished the year averaging 15.6 points and 3.6 rebounds per game before entering the transfer portal for a second time.

In April 2023, King announced that he would be transferring to the University of Richmond to play for the Richmond Spiders. In his Richmond debut, King scored 34 points, helping lead Richmond to a 93–75 victory.

== Professional career ==
Following the close of his college career, King signed his first professional contract, with Lucentum Alicante of Spain's Primera FEB.

On July 14, 2025, King signed a two–year deal with Maroussi of the Greek Basket League.

On June 29, 2026, he signed with Le Mans of the LNB Pro A.

== Career statistics ==
Legend
GP	Games played	GS	Games started	MPG	Minutes per game
FG%	Field goal percentage	3P%	3-point field goal percentage	FT%	Free throw percentage
RPG	Rebounds per game	APG	Assists per game	SPG	Steals per game
BPG	Blocks per game	PPG	Points per game	**Bold**	Career high

=== College ===
Year	Team	GP	GS	MPG	FG%	3P%	FT%	RPG	APG	SPG	BPG	PPG
2019–20	Siena	30	2	18.0	.348	.370	.917	1.3	.7	.5	.0	4.7
2020–21	Siena	17	17	33.8	.413	.344	.828	1.6	1.9	.8	.1	12.2
2021–22	East Tennessee State	32	31	32.7	.450	.429	.768	3.3	2.3	.8	.1	14.6
2022–23	East Tennessee State	32	31	35.9	.399	.315	.853	3.6	3.1	1.1	.1	15.6
2023–24	Richmond	33	33	35.2	.454	.414	.816	3.8	2.5	1.3	.1	18.0
