= DaRon Holmes II =

American basketball player (born 2002)

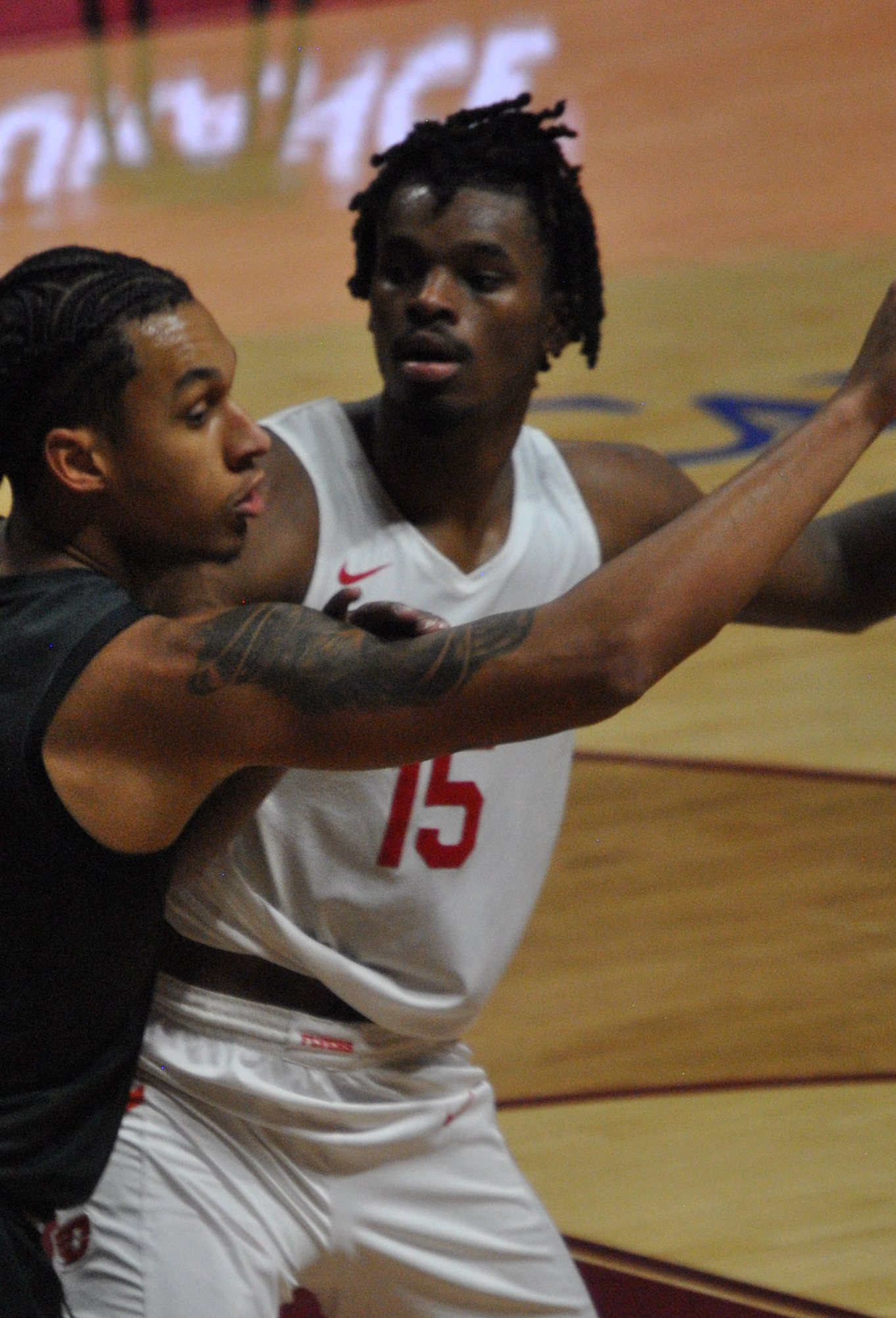
- Holmes with Dayton in 2022

No. 14 – Grand Rapids Gold
- Position: Power forward
- League: NBA G League

Personal information
- Born: August 15, 2002 (age 24) Overland Park, Kansas, U.S.
- Listed height: 6 ft 9 in (2.06 m)
- Listed weight: 225 lb (102 kg)

Career information
- High school: Millennium (Goodyear, Arizona); Montverde Academy (Montverde, Florida); AZ Compass Prep (Chandler, Arizona)
- College: Dayton (2021–2024)
- NBA draft: 2024: 1st round, 22nd overall pick
- Drafted by: Phoenix Suns
- Playing career: 2024–present

Career history
- 2024–present: Denver Nuggets
- 2025–present: →Grand Rapids Gold

Career highlights
- Consensus second-team All-American (2024); Atlantic 10 co-Player of the Year (2024); 2× First-team All-Atlantic 10 (2023, 2024); Second-team All-Atlantic 10 (2022); Atlantic 10 Defensive Player of the Year (2024); Atlantic 10 Rookie of the Year (2022)
- Stats at NBA.com
- Stats at Basketball Reference

DaRon Rodrick Holmes II (born August 15, 2002) is an American professional basketball player for the Grand Rapids Gold of the NBA G League, on assignment from the Denver Nuggets of the National Basketball Association (NBA). He played college basketball for the Dayton Flyers.

== Early life and high school career ==
Holmes grew up in Goodyear, Arizona and initially attended Millennium High School. He was named the Arizona Gatorade Player of the Year after averaging 23.7 points, 10.6 rebounds, 3.8 blocks, and 3.1 assists per game as a junior. Holmes transferred to Montverde Academy in Montverde, Florida prior to the start of his senior year. He ultimately moved back to Arizona during his winter break and transferred a second time to AZ Compass Prep School in Chandler, Arizona. Holmes was rated a four-star recruit and committed to playing college basketball for Dayton over offers from Arizona, Marquette, and California.

== College career ==
Holmes started all 35 of the Dayton Flyers' games as a freshman and led the team with 12.8 points per game and also averaged 6.1 rebounds and 2.3 blocks per game. He also set a school record with 81 total blocks in a season. Holmes was named the Atlantic 10 Conference Rookie of the Year, second-team All-Atlantic 10, and to the conference All-Defense team.

Holmes entered his sophomore season on the watch list for the Karl Malone Award. As a sophomore, he averaged 18.4 points, 8.1 rebounds, and 1.9 blocks per game and was named first-team All-Atlantic 10 team.

On April 24, 2023, Holmes declared for the 2023 NBA draft while maintaining his college eligibility. He later withdrew from the draft on the day of the deadline and announced that he would return to Dayton for his junior season.

On May 30, 2024, Holmes declared for the 2024 NBA draft. On June 26, he was selected as the 22nd overall pick by the Phoenix Suns, who subsequently traded him to the Denver Nuggets in exchange for the draft rights to Ryan Dunn (No. 28), the draft rights to the 56th pick (which they later traded to the New York Knicks), a 2026 second-round selection and a 2031 second-round selection. As the No. 22 overall pick, he became the fifth Flyer to be an NBA first round draft pick.

== Professional career ==
Holmes was selected with the 22nd overall pick by the Phoenix Suns in the 2024 NBA draft, however, immediately on draft night, he was traded for the 28th and 56th overall picks in the 2024 draft alongside second-round picks in 2026 and 2031 and on July 9, he signed with the Nuggets. Three days later, he suffered a torn right Achilles tendon in his Summer League debut, ending his season.

On October 25, 2025, Holmes made his professional debut. recording 3 points and a foul in three minutes of play. On December 31, 2025 he scored a career-high 11 points along with 3 rebounds, 1 assist, and a block.

== Career statistics ==
Legend
| GP | Games played | GS | Games started | MPG | Minutes per game |
| FG% | Field goal percentage | 3P% | 3-point field goal percentage | FT% | Free throw percentage |
| RPG | Rebounds per game | APG | Assists per game | SPG | Steals per game |
| BPG | Blocks per game | PPG | Points per game | **Bold** | Career high |

=== NBA ===
==== Regular season ====
| Year | Team | GP | GS | MPG | FG% | 3P% | FT% | RPG | APG | SPG | BPG | PPG |
|---|---|---|---|---|---|---|---|---|---|---|---|---|
| 2025–26 | Denver | 25 | 6 | 8.4 | .508 | .444 | .786 | 1.4 | .6 | .0 | .2 | 3.7 |
| Career | | 25 | 6 | 8.4 | .508 | .444 | .786 | 1.4 | .6 | .0 | .2 | 3.7 |

==== Playoffs ====
| Year | Team | GP | GS | MPG | FG% | 3P% | FT% | RPG | APG | SPG | BPG | PPG |
|---|---|---|---|---|---|---|---|---|---|---|---|---|
| 2026 | Denver | 2 | 0 | 2.0 | — | — | — | 1.0 | .0 | .0 | .0 | .0 |
| Career | | 2 | 0 | 2.0 | — | — | — | 1.0 | .0 | .0 | .0 | .0 |

=== College ===
| Year | Team | GP | GS | MPG | FG% | 3P% | FT% | RPG | APG | SPG | BPG | PPG |
|---|---|---|---|---|---|---|---|---|---|---|---|---|
| 2021–22 | Dayton | **35** | **35** | 30.7 | **.649** | .143 | .586 | 6.1 | 1.3 | .4 | **2.3** | 12.8 |
| 2022–23 | Dayton | 34 | 34 | **34.3** | .590 | .316 | .669 | 8.1 | 1.7 | .7 | 1.9 | 18.4 |
| 2023–24 | Dayton | 33 | 33 | 32.5 | .544 | **.386** | **.713** | **8.5** | **2.6** | **.9** | 2.1 | **20.4** |
| Career | | 102 | 102 | 32.5 | .588 | .358 | .671 | 7.5 | 1.9 | .7 | 2.1 | 17.1 |
