= South Alabama Jaguars men's basketball statistical leaders =

The South Alabama Jaguars men's basketball statistical leaders are individual statistical leaders of the South Alabama Jaguars men's basketball program in various categories, including points, assists, blocks, rebounds, and steals. Within those areas, the lists identify single-game, single-season, and career leaders. The Jaguars represent the University of South Alabama in the NCAA's Sun Belt Conference.

South Alabama began competing in intercollegiate basketball in 1968. The NCAA did not officially record assists as a stat until the 1983–84 season, and blocks and steals until the 1985–86 season, but South Alabama's record books include players in these stats before these seasons. These lists are updated through the end of the 2020–21 season.

== Scoring ==
Career
Rk	Player	Points	Seasons
1	Jeff Hodge	2,221	1985–86 1986–87 1987–88 1988–89
2	Augustine Rubit	1,917	2010–11 2011–12 2012–13 2013–14
3	Terry Catledge	1,866	1982–83 1983–84 1984–85
4	Ed Rains	1,801	1977–78 1978–79 1979–80 1980–81
5	Junie Lewis	1,726	1986–87 1987–88 1988–89
	Rory White	1,726	1977–78 1978–79 1979–80 1980–81 1981–82
7	Ken Williams	1,723	2013–14 2014–15 2015–16 2016–17
8	Josh Ajayi	1,691	2016–17 2017–18 2018–19 2019–20
9	Demetric Bennett	1,405	2005–06 2006–07 2007–08
10	Andy Denny	1,352	1969–70 1970–71 1971–72

Season
Rk	Player	Points	Season
1	Terry Catledge	718	1984–85
2	Jeff Hodge	695	1988–89
3	Demetric Bennett	649	2007–08
4	Isaiah Moore	642	2022–23
5	Chaze Harris	633	2025–26
6	Junie Lewis	630	1987–88
7	Jeff Hodge	603	1987–88
8	Rodrick Sikes	597	2017–18
	Terry Catledge	597	1983–84
10	Michael Flowers	588	2020–21

Single game
Rk	Player	Points	Season	Opponent
1	Eugene Oliver	46	1973–74	Southern Miss
	Barry Dunning Jr.	46	2024–25	Texas State
3	Junie Lewis	41	1987–88	Virginia Commonwealth
	Roger Webb	41	1969–70	Florida Tech
5	Roger Webb	40	1970–71	Abilene Christian
6	Demetric Bennett	39	2007–08	Mississippi State
	Michael Gerren	39	1982–83	Jacksonville
	John Bennett	39	1978–79	South Florida

== Rebounds ==
Career
Rk	Player	Rebounds	Seasons
1	Augustine Rubit	1,183	2010–11 2011–12 2012–13 2013–14
2	Terry Catledge	932	1982–83 1983–84 1984–85
3	Josh Ajayi	829	2016–17 2017–18 2018–19 2019–20
4	Rory White	737	1977–78 1978–79 1979–80 1980–81 1981–82
5	Ed Rains	720	1977–78 1978–79 1979–80 1980–81
6	Trhae Mitchell	704	2016–17 2017–18 2018–19 2019–20
7	Henry Williams	695	2000–01 2001–02 2002–03 2003–04
8	Virgil Stanescu	648	1998–99 1999–00 2000–01
9	John May	639	1977–78 1978–79 1979–80 1980–81
10	Georgi Boyanov	598	2013–14 2014–15 2015–16 2016–17

Season
Rk	Player	Rebounds	Season
1	Terry Catledge	332	1983–84
2	Terry Catledge	322	1984–85
3	Augustine Rubit	315	2012–13
4	Augustine Rubit	308	2010–11
5	Kevin Samuel	305	2022–23
6	Augustine Rubit	292	2013–14
7	John Mallard	291	1976–77
8	Gabe Estaba	286	1988–89
9	Terry Catledge	278	1982–83
	Virgil Stanescu	278	2000–01

Single game
Rk	Player	Rebounds	Season	Opponent
1	Leon Williams	28	1972–73	Texas-Arlington
2	Terry Catledge	26	1984–85	UNC Charlotte
3	Steve Schmitt	24	1971–72	Memphis
	Wally Prescott	24	1969–70	Roanoke
5	Rick Sinclair	23	1974–75	St. Bernard

== Assists ==
Career
Rk	Player	Assists	Seasons
1	Cedric Yelding	566	1989–90 1990–91 1991–92 1992–93
2	Jeff Hodge	461	1985–86 1986–87 1987–88 1988–89
3	Demetrice Williams	429	1999–00 2000–01 2001–02 2002–03
4	Scott Williams	400	1977–78 1978–79 1979–80 1980–81
5	Junie Lewis	390	1986–87 1987–88 1988–89
6	Anthony Foster	373	1992–93 1993–94 1994–95
7	Daon Merritt	346	2006–07 2007–08
8	Ken Williams	343	2013–14 2014–15 2015–16 2016–17
9	Trhae Mitchell	310	2016–17 2017–18 2018–19 2019–20
10	Barrington Stevens III	300	2012–13 2013–14 2014–15 2015–16

Season
Rk	Player	Assists	Season
1	Anthony Foster	203	1994–95
2	Junie Lewis	188	1988–89
3	Cedric Yelding	184	1991–92
4	Herb Andrew	183	1980–81
5	Daon Merritt	182	2007–08
6	Ray Edwards	174	1974–75
7	Alonzo Lambert	165	1975–76
8	Daon Merritt	164	2006–07
9	Chaze Harris	163	2025–26
10	Isaiah Moore	158	2022–23

Single game
Rk	Player	Assists	Season	Opponent
1	Herb Andrew	19	1980–81	Mississippi Valley State
2	Cedric Yelding	17	1991–92	Louisiana-Lafayette
3	Anthony Foster	16	1994–95	Arkansas-Little Rock
4	Isaiah Moore	13	2022–23	New Mexico
	Daon Merritt	13	2007–08	Troy
	Lonnie Legette	13	1977–78	New Orleans
	Kevin Courtney	13	1976–77	Northwestern State
	Ray Edwards	13	1974–75	Samford

== Steals ==
Career
Rk	Player	Steals	Seasons
1	Cedric Yelding	241	1989–90 1990–91 1991–92 1992–93
2	Jeff Hodge	223	1985–86 1986–87 1987–88 1988–89
	Demetrice Williams	223	1999–00 2000–01 2001–02 2002–03
4	Ed Rains	162	1977–78 1978–79 1979–80 1980–81
5	Carlos Smith	133	2003–04 2004–05 2005–06 2006–07
6	Junie Lewis	132	1986–87 1987–88 1988–89
7	Scott Williams	131	1977–78 1978–79 1979–80 1980–81
8	Demetric Bennett	124	2005–06 2006–07 2007–08
9	Dexter Shouse	116	1983–84 1984–85
10	Ericson Beck	115	1999–00 2000–01
	John Pettway	115	2017–18 2018–19 2019–20 2020–21

Season
Rk	Player	Steals	Season
1	Cedric Yelding	84	1992–93
2	Dexter Shouse	77	1984–85
3	Demetrice Williams	76	1999–00
4	Cedric Yelding	70	1991–92
5	Ericson Beck	69	2000–01
6	Eugene Oliver	68	1973–74
7	Glenn Selph	64	1973–74
	Jeff Hodge	64	1987–88
9	Demetrice Williams	62	2000–01
10	Darrian Evans	61	1997–98

Single game
Rk	Player	Steals	Season	Opponent
1	Ed Rains	9	1979–80	Oregon Tech
2	Ericson Beck	8	2000–01	West Florida
3	Demetric Bennett	7	2006–07	Texas College
	Demetrice Williams	7	2002–03	North Georgia
	Cedric Yelding	7	1991–92	Western Kentucky
	Cedric Yelding	7	1992–93	Baylor
	Kenny Gibson	7	1984–85	Old Dominion
	Jimmy Tate	7	1976–77	Oglethorpe
	Michael Gerren	7	1982–83	South Florida

== Blocks ==
Career
Rk	Player	Blocks	Seasons
1	Kelly Blaine	213	1981–82 1982–83 1983–84 1984–85
2	Javier Carter	204	2009–10 2010–11 2011–12 2012–13
3	Trhae Mitchell	185	2016–17 2017–18 2018–19 2019–20
4	Augustine Rubit	139	2010–11 2011–12 2012–13 2013–14
5	Brandon Davis	114	2006–07 2007–08 2008–09
6	John May	111	1977–78 1978–79 1979–80 1980–81
7	Ronald Douglas	96	2007–08 2008–09
8	Rory White	95	1977–78 1978–79 1979–80 1980–81 1981–82
9	Frank Wilson	86	1993–94 1994–95
10	Kevin Samuel	86	2022–23

Season
Rk	Player	Blocks	Season
1	Kevin Samuel	86	2022–23
2	Kelvin Cato	85	1993–94
3	Kelly Blaine	78	1984–85
4	Javier Carter	72	2012–13
	Javier Carter	72	2011–12
6	Trhae Mitchell	71	2018–19
7	Kelly Blaine	65	1983–84
8	Ronald Douglas	62	2008–09
9	Cesar Portillo	60	1990–91
10	Kelly Blaine	48	1982–83

Single game
Rk	Player	Blocks	Season	Opponent
1	Trhae Mitchell	9	2019–20	Pikeville
	Frank Wilson	9	1994–95	UAB
	Kelly Blaine	9	1984–85	Alabama State
4	Trhae Mitchell	8	2018–19	Arkansas State
	Javier Carter	8	2011–12	Western Kentucky
	Kelvin Cato	8	1993–94	West Virginia
