= 1989 Sun Belt Conference men's basketball tournament =

- Classification: Division I
- Season: 1988–89
- Teams: 8
- Site: Charlotte Coliseum; Charlotte, NC
- Champions: South Alabama (1st title)
- Winning coach: Ronnie Arrow (1st title)
- MVP: Jeff Hodge (South Alabama)

1988–89 Sun Belt Conference men's basketball standings
	Conf.				Overall
Team	W		L	PCT	W		L	PCT
South Alabama †	11	–	3	.786	23	–	9	.719
UNC Charlotte	10	–	4	.714	17	–	12	.586
VCU	9	–	5	.643	13	–	15	.464
UAB	8	–	6	.571	22	–	12	.647
Old Dominion	7	–	7	.500	15	–	13	.536
Jacksonville	5	–	9	.357	14	–	16	.467
Western Kentucky	4	–	10	.286	14	–	15	.483
South Florida	2	–	12	.143	7	–	21	.250
† 1989 Sun Belt Conference tournament winner Rankings from AP Poll

The 1989 Sun Belt Conference men's basketball tournament was held March 4–6 at the Charlotte Coliseum in Charlotte, North Carolina.

Top-seeded South Alabama easily defeated Jacksonville in the championship game, 105–59, to win their first Sun Belt men's basketball tournament.

The Jaguars, in turn, received an automatic bid to the 1989 NCAA tournament. No other Sun Belt members received at-large bids to the tournament.

== Format ==
There were no changes to the existing tournament format. All eight conference members were placed into the initial quarterfinal round and each team was seeded based on its regular season conference record.

== Bracket ==
Quarterfinals; Saturday, March 4
1	South Alabama	70
8	South Florida	65
5	Old Dominion	87
4	UAB	89
3	VCU	85
6	Jacksonville	93
7	Western Kentucky	65
2	UNC Charlotte	63

Semifinals; Sunday, March 5
1	South Alabama	103
4	UAB	84
6	Jacksonville	77
7	Western Kentucky	72

Championship; Monday, March 6
1	South Alabama	105
6	Jacksonville	59

== See also ==
- Sun Belt Conference women's basketball tournament
