= Sun Belt Conference Men's Basketball Player of the Year =

US sporting award

- Awarded for: the most outstanding men's basketball player in the Sun Belt Conference
- Country: United States
- Presented by: Sun Belt Conference

History
- First award: 1977
- Most recent: Chaze Harris, South Alabama

The Sun Belt Conference Men's Basketball Player of the Year is an award given to the most outstanding men's basketball player in the Sun Belt Conference (SBC). The award was first given following the conference's first basketball season of 1976–77. Four players have been selected twice (Terry Catledge, Chris Gatling, Chico Fletcher, and R. J. Hunter), while no player has earned a three-time player of the year selection.

Western Kentucky (which left the SBC for Conference USA in 2014) is tied with current member South Alabama for the most all-time winners with seven each.

== Key ==
| † | Co-Players of the Year |
| * | Awarded a national player of the year award that same season: Helms Foundation College Basketball Player of the Year (1904–05 to 1978–79); UPI College Basketball Player of the Year (1954–55 to 1995–96); Oscar Robertson Trophy (1958–59 to present); Naismith College Player of the Year (1968–69 to present); John R. Wooden Award (1976–77 to present) |
| Player (X) | Denotes the number of times the player has been awarded the Sun Belt Player of the Year award at that point |

== Winners ==
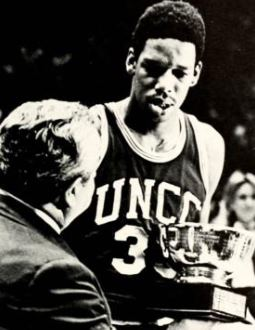
Cedric Maxwell, Charlotte, 1977

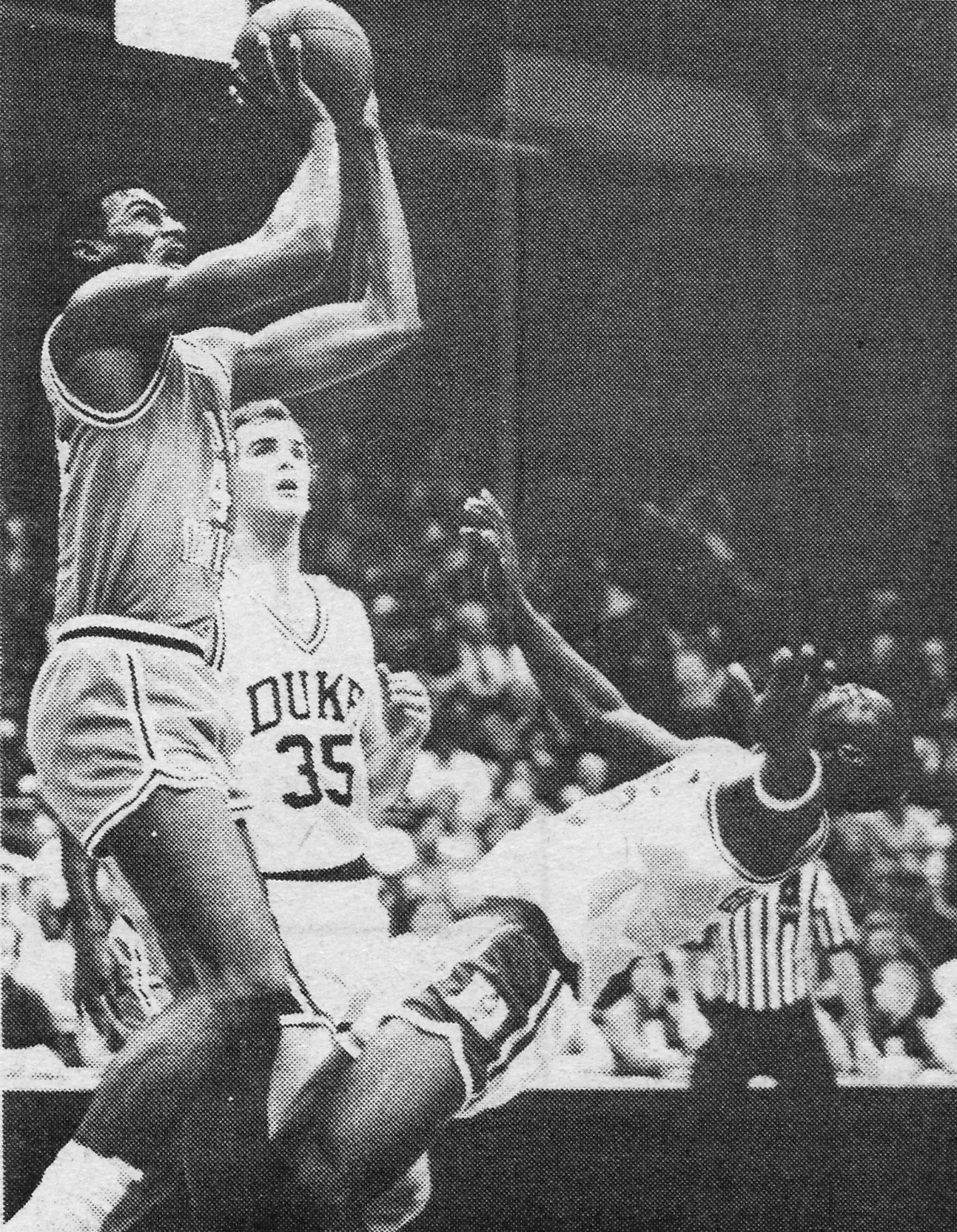
Kenny Gattison (l), Old Dominion, 1986

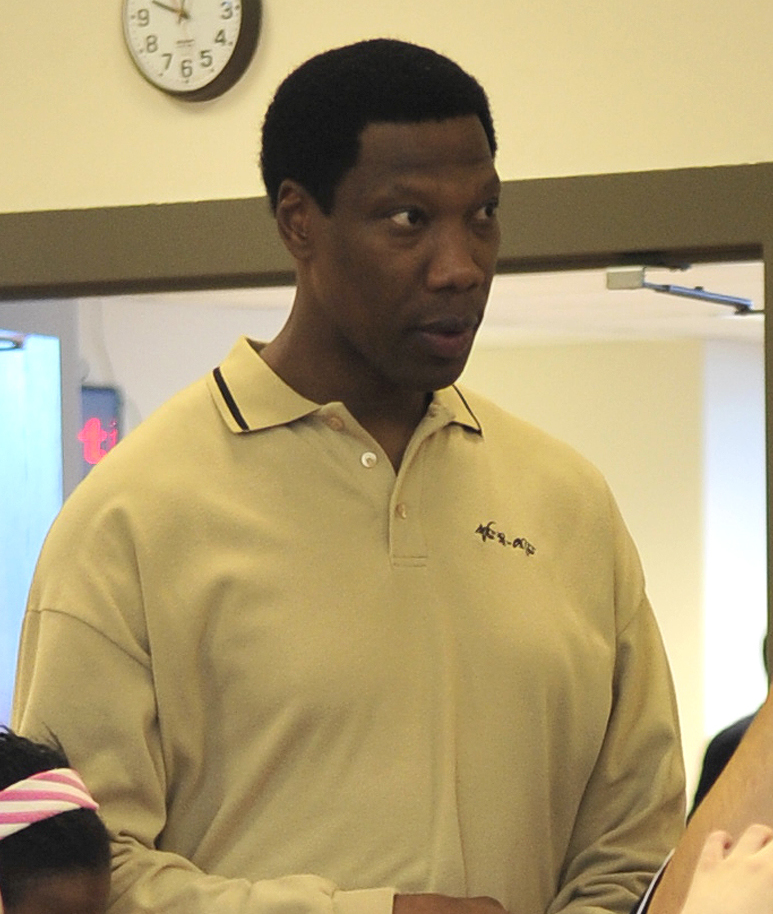
Ervin Johnson, New Orleans, 1993

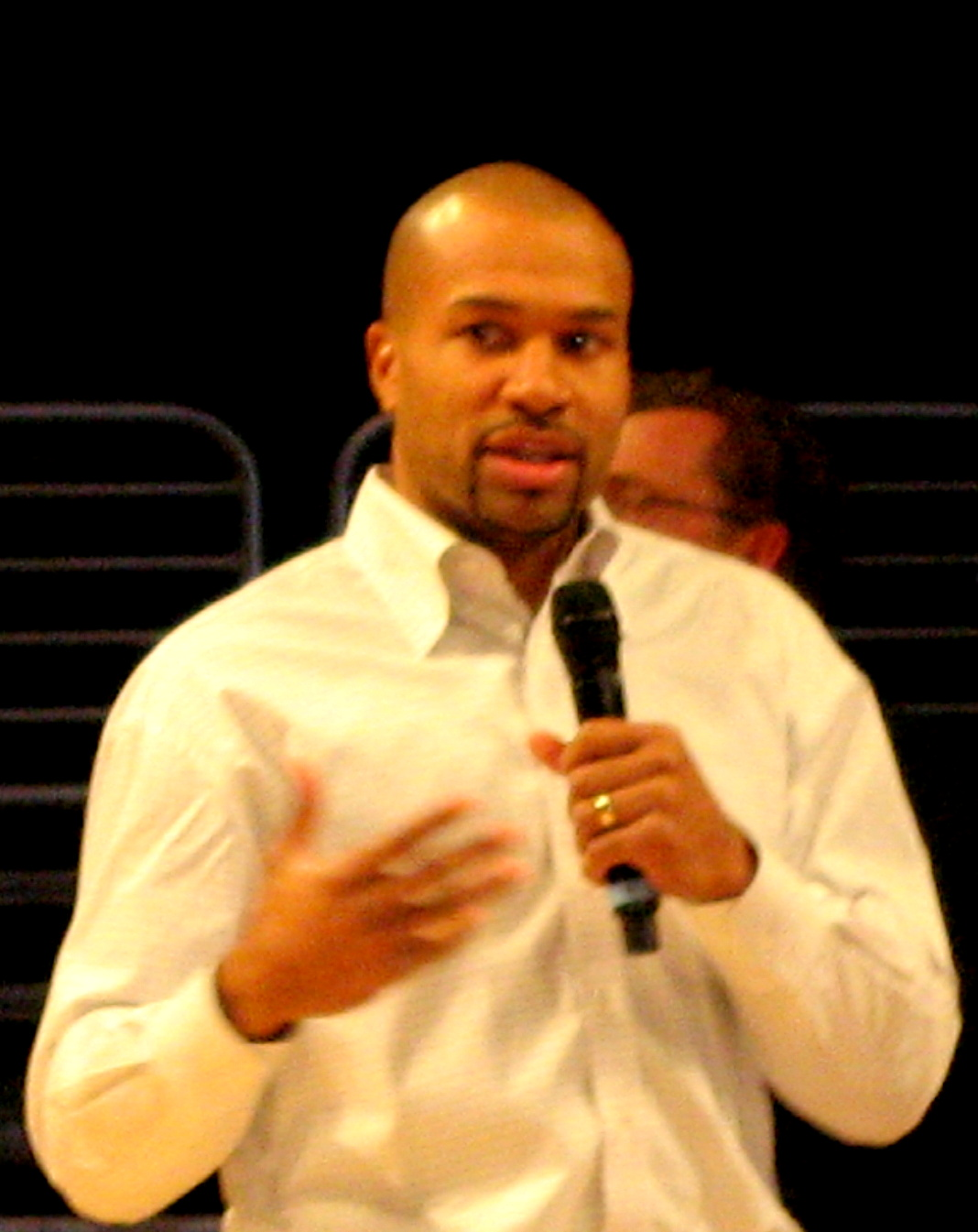
Derek Fisher, Little Rock, 1996

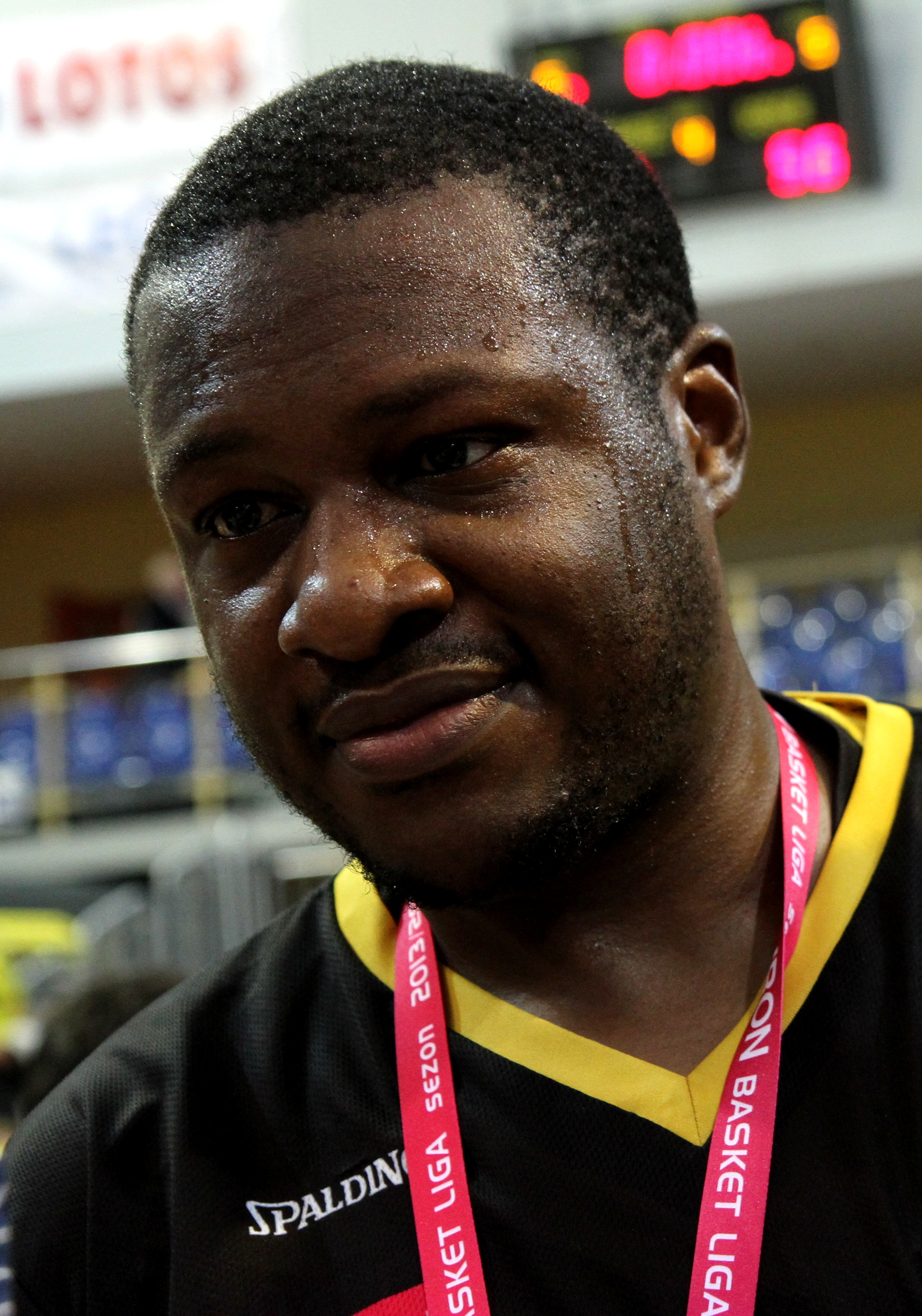
Yemi Nicholson, Denver, 2005

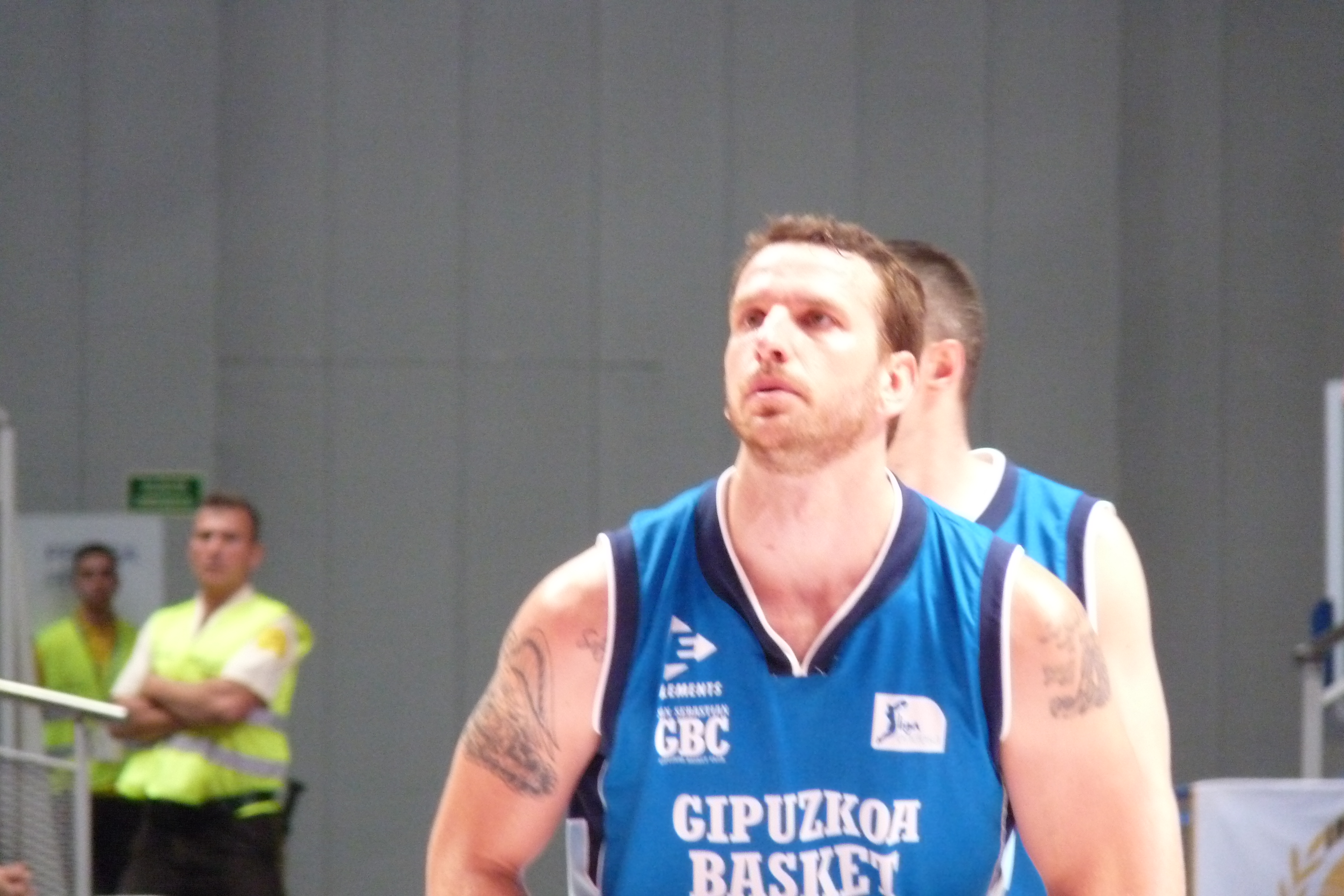
Anthony Winchester, Western Kentucky, 2006

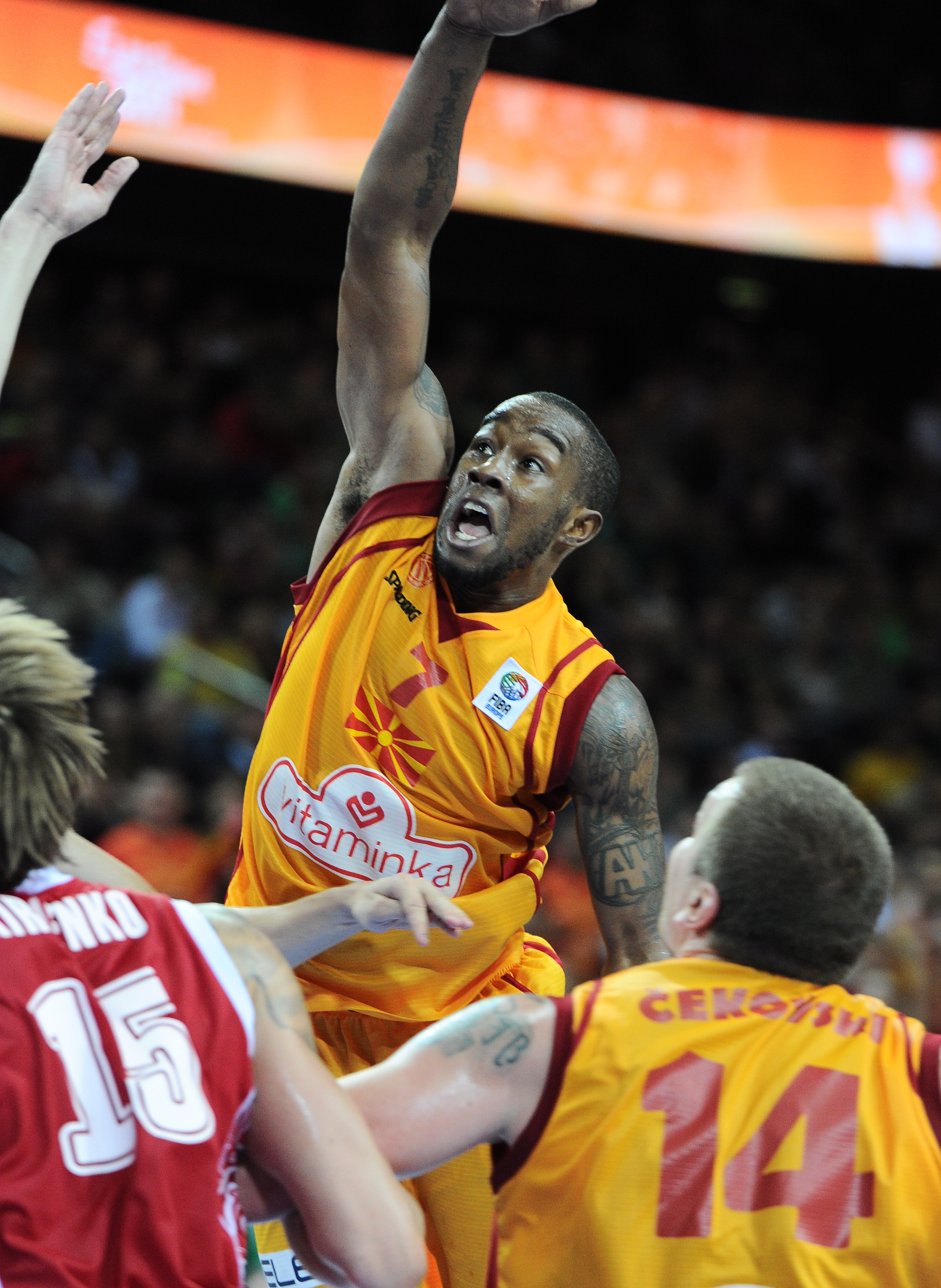
Bo McCalebb, New Orleans, 2007

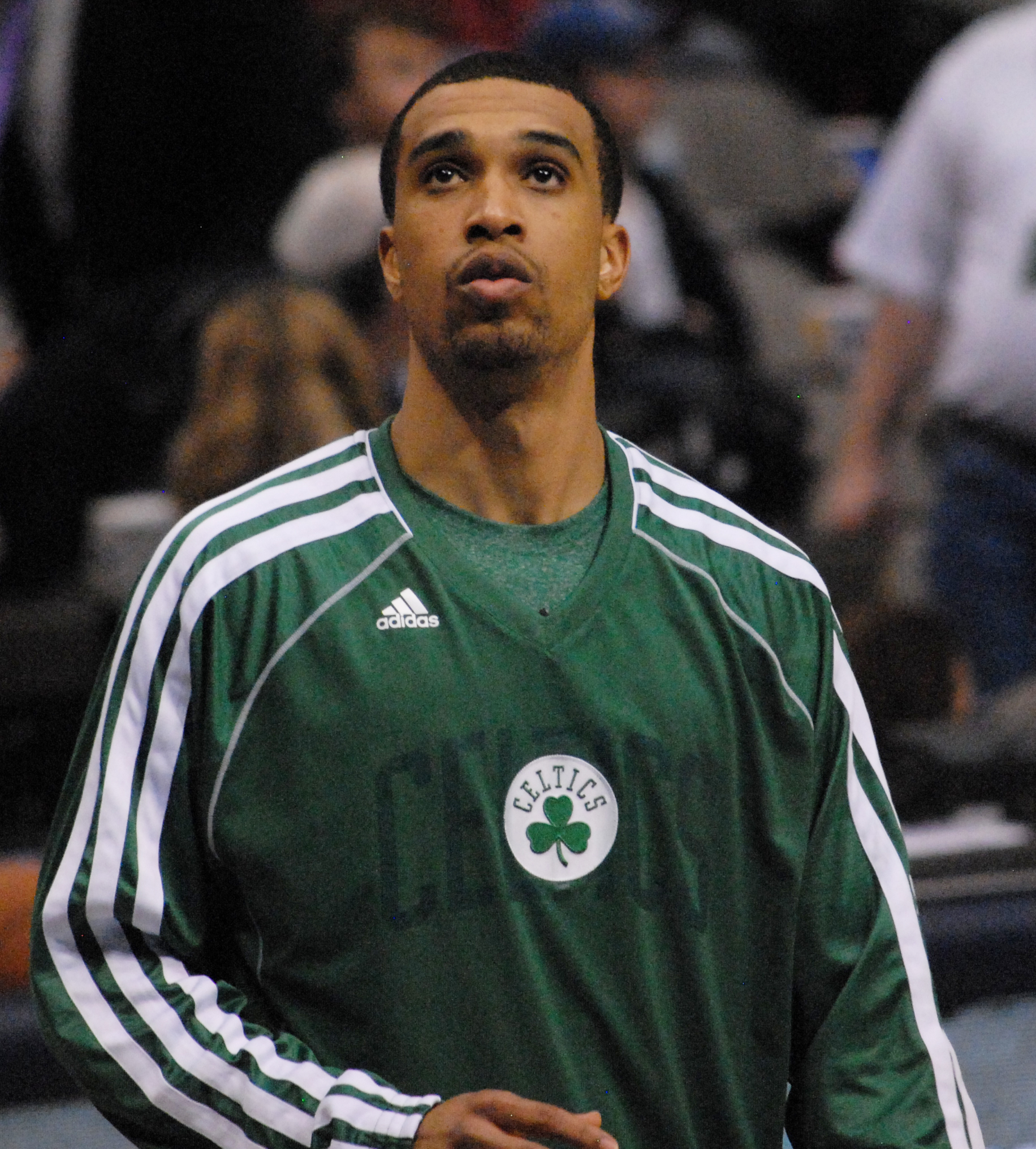
Courtney Lee, Western Kentucky, 2008

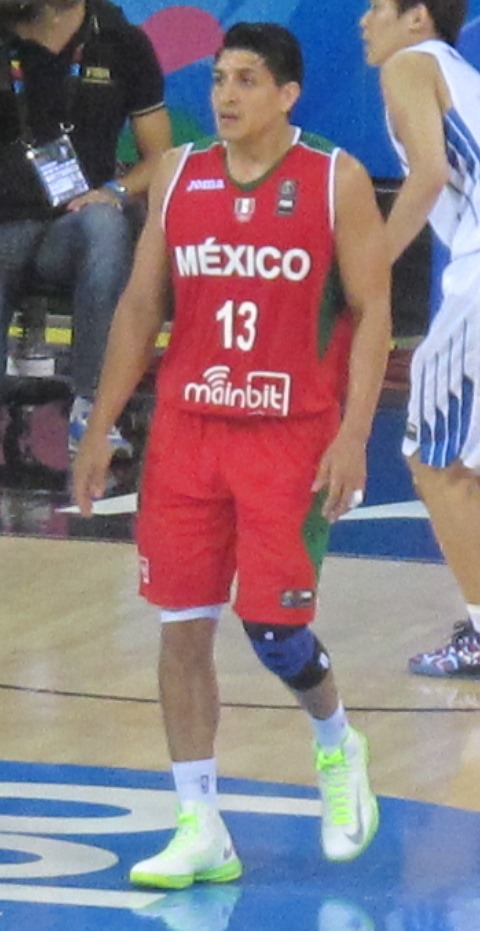
Orlando Méndez-Valdez, Western Kentucky, 2009

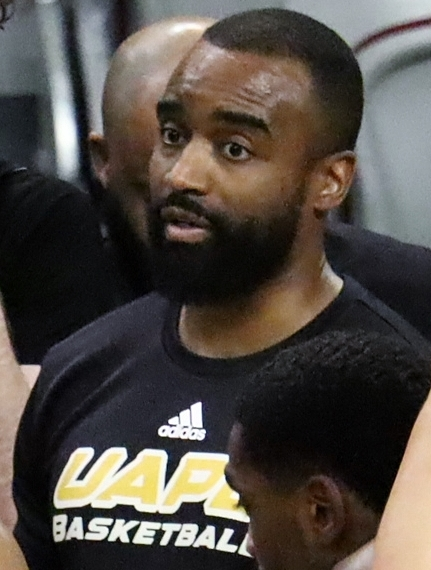
Solomon Bozeman, Little Rock, 2011

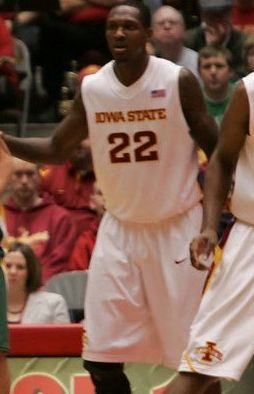
LaRon Dendy, Middle Tennessee, 2012

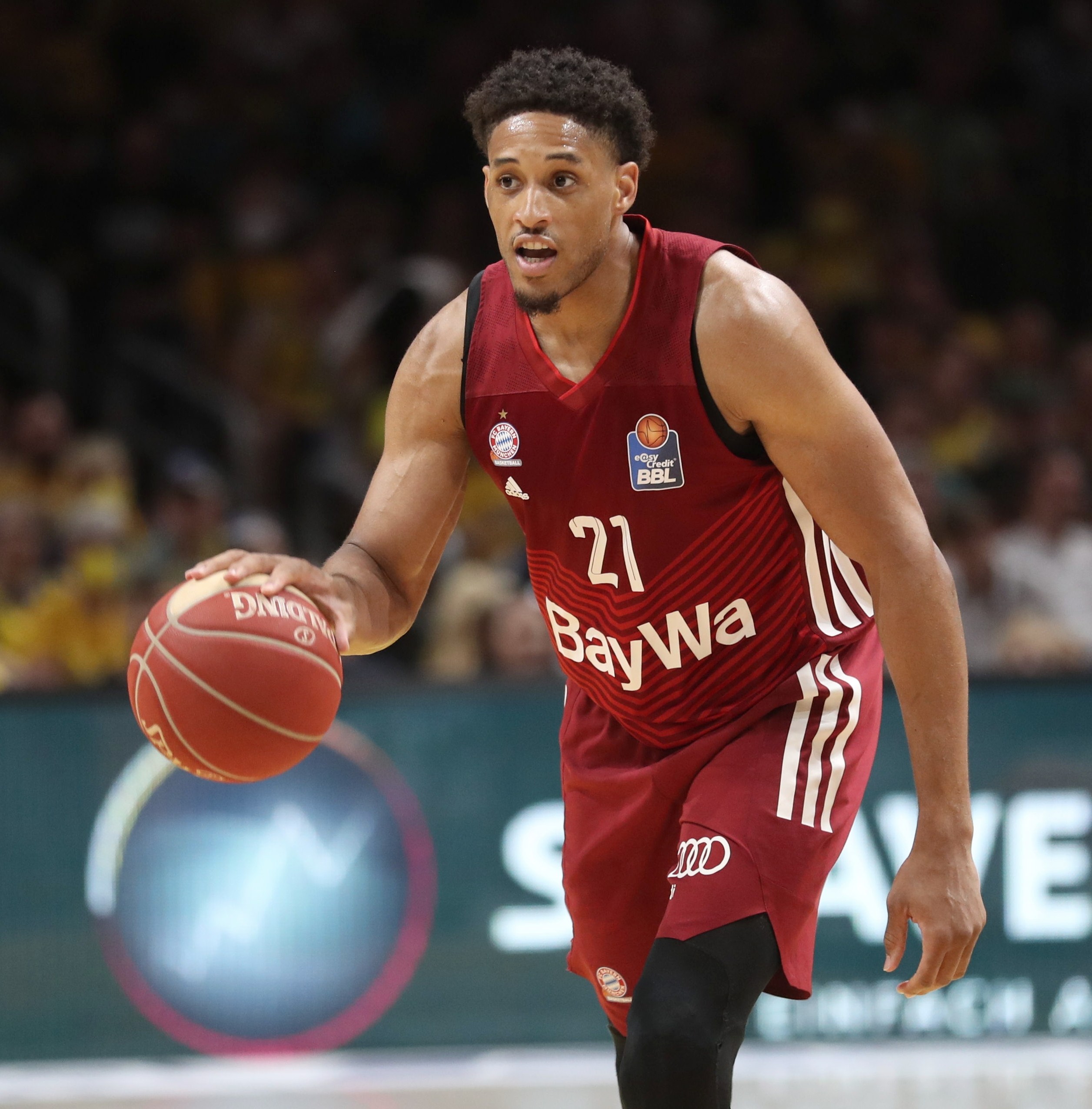
Augustine Rubit, South Alabama, 2013

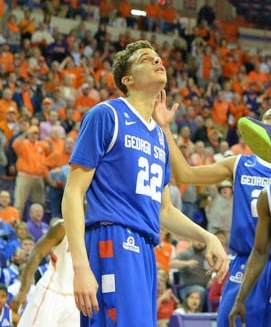
R. J. Hunter, Georgia State, 2014 and 2015

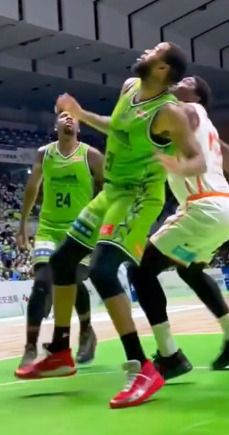
Shawn Long, Louisiana, 2016

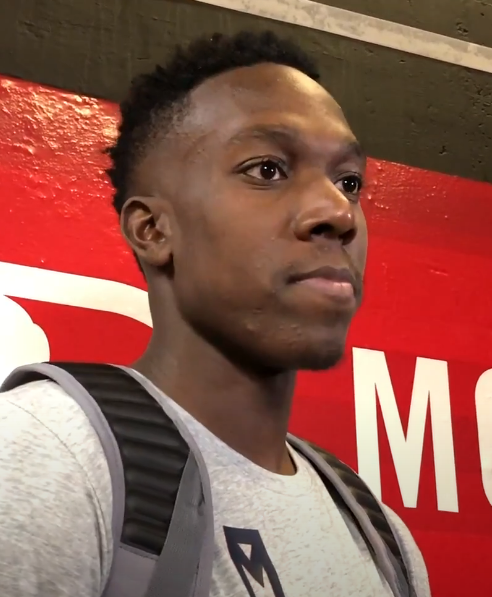
Kevin Hervey, UT Arlington, 2017

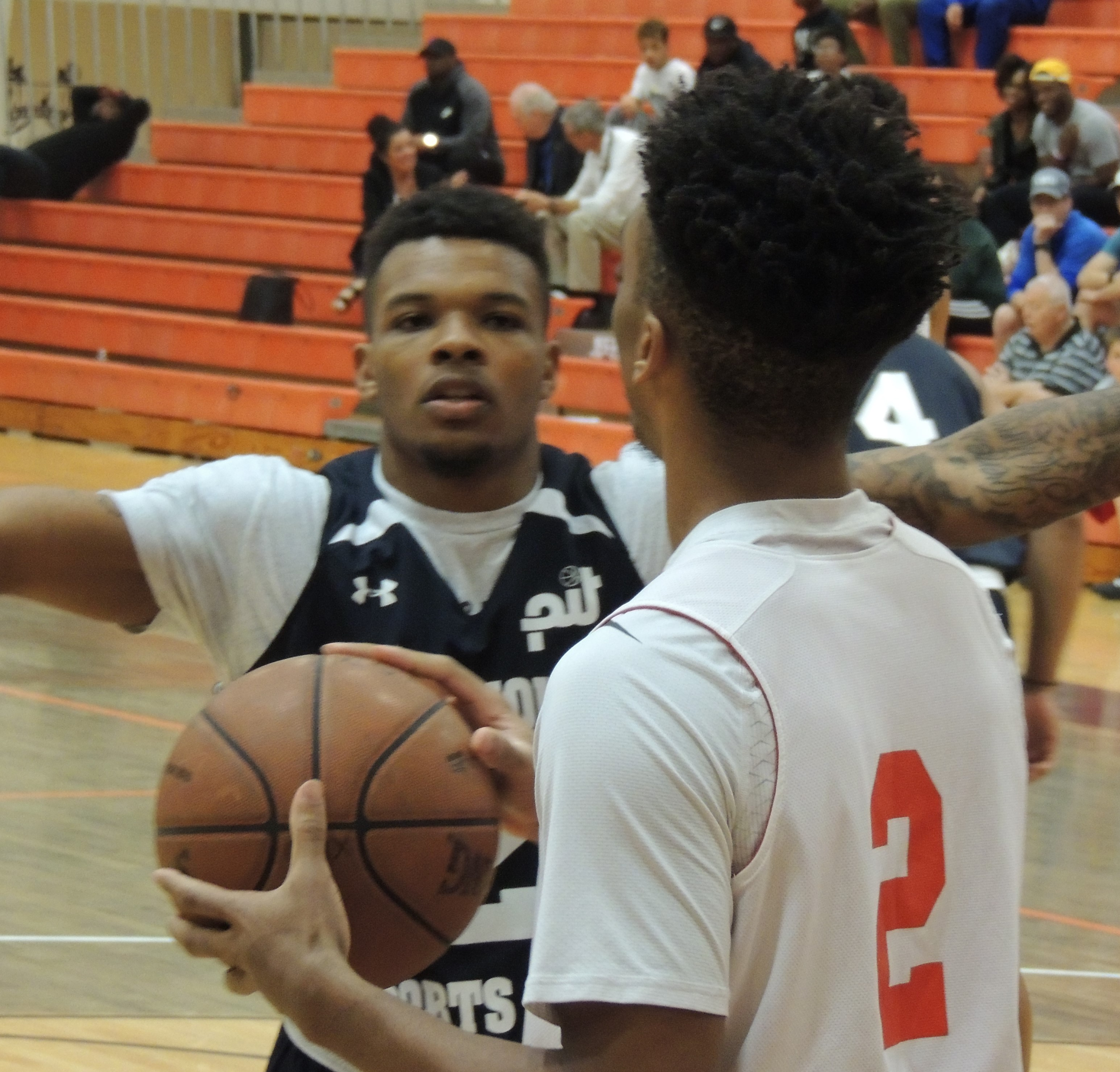
Tookie Brown, Georgia Southern, 2019

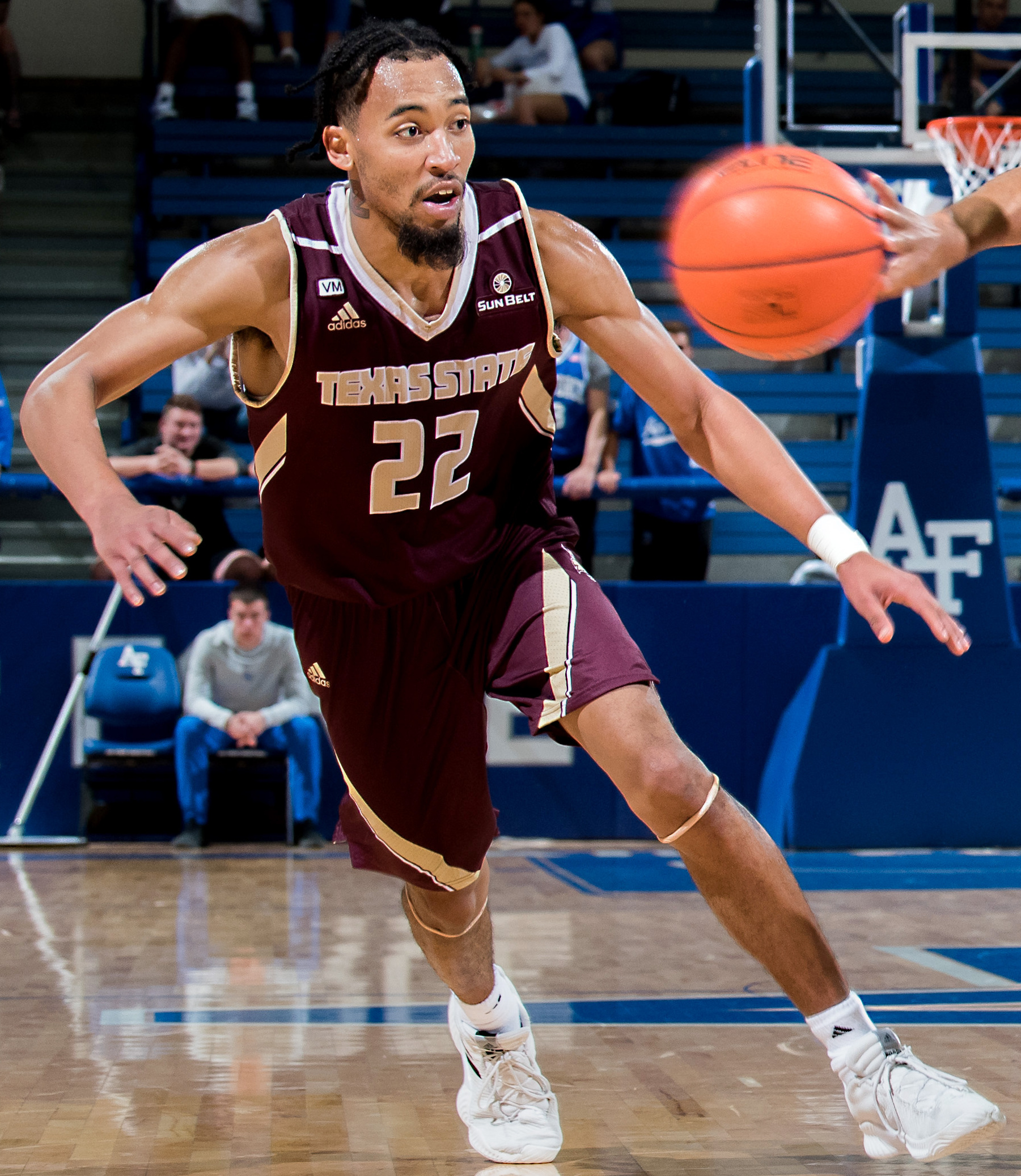
Nijal Pearson, Texas State, 2020

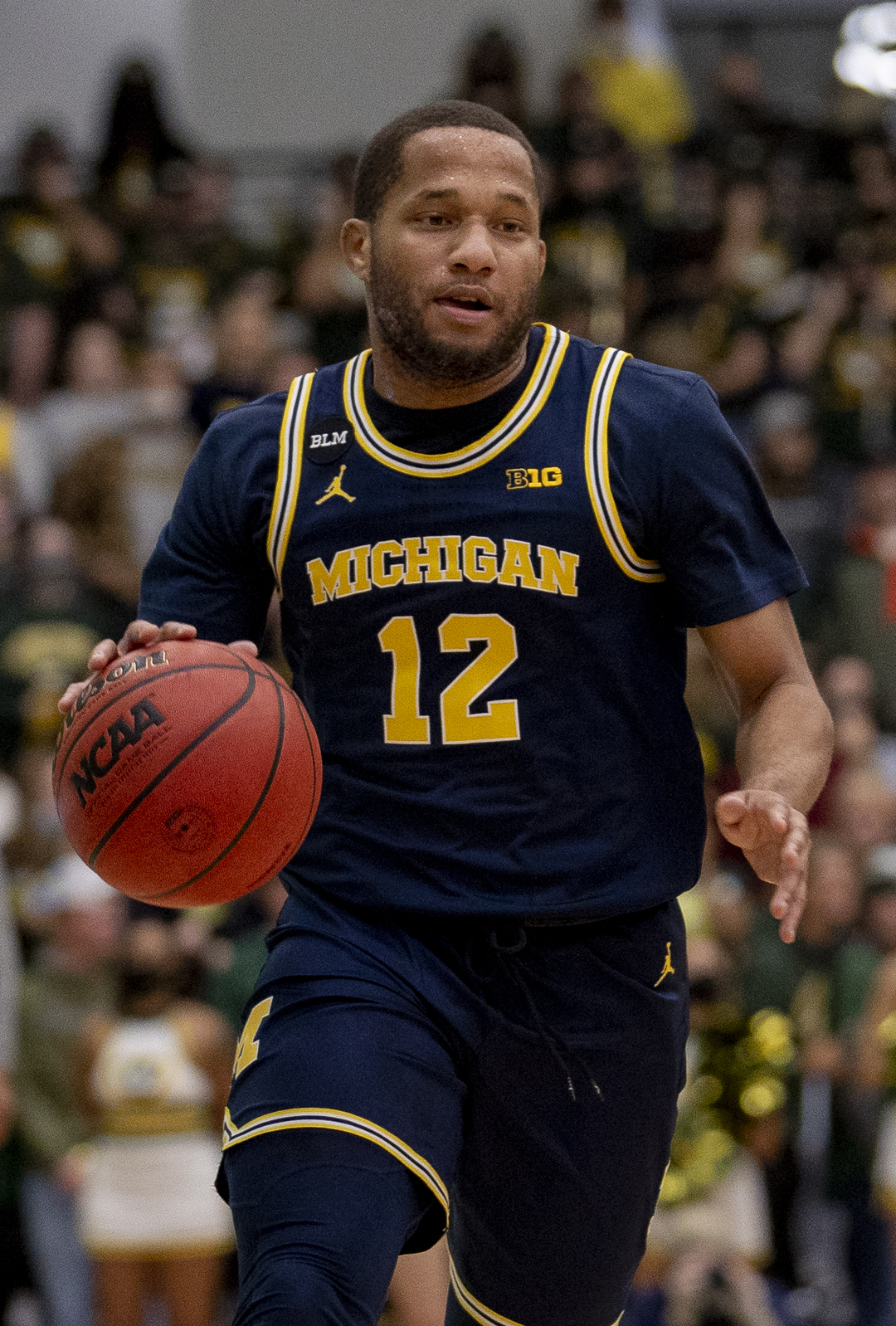
DeVante' Jones, Coastal Carolina, 2021

| Season | Player | School | Position | Class | Reference |
|---|---|---|---|---|---|
| 1976–77 | Cedric Maxwell | Charlotte | PF / C | Senior | |
| 1977–78 | Wayne Cooper | New Orleans | C | Senior | |
| 1978–79 | Rory White | South Alabama | PF | Sophomore | |
| 1979–80 | James Ray | Jacksonville | PF | Senior | |
| 1980–81 | Ed Rains | South Alabama | SF | Senior | |
| 1981–82 | Oliver Robinson | UAB | SG | Senior | |
| 1982–83^{†} | Charlie Bradley | South Florida | SF | Sophomore | |
| 1982–83^{†} | Calvin Duncan | VCU | SG | Sophomore | |
| 1983–84 | Terry Catledge | South Alabama | PF | Junior | |
| 1984–85 | Terry Catledge (2) | South Alabama | PF | Senior | |
| 1985–86 | Kenny Gattison | Old Dominion | C | Senior | |
| 1986–87 | Tellis Frank | Western Kentucky | PF | Senior | |
| 1987–88 | Byron Dinkins | Charlotte | PG | Junior | |
| 1988–89 | Jeff Hodge | South Alabama | SG | Senior | |
| 1989–90 | Chris Gatling | Old Dominion | PF | Junior | |
| 1990–91 | Chris Gatling (2) | Old Dominion | PF | Senior | |
| 1991–92 | Ron Ellis | Louisiana Tech | PF | Senior | |
| 1992–93 | Ervin Johnson | New Orleans | C | Senior | |
| 1993–94^{†} | Michael Allen | Louisiana | G | Senior | |
| 1993–94^{†} | Jeff Clifton | Arkansas State | F | Senior | |
| 1994–95 | Chris Robinson | Western Kentucky | SG | Junior | |
| 1995–96 | Derek Fisher | Little Rock | SG | Senior | |
| 1996–97 | Muntrelle Dobbins | Little Rock | PF | Senior | |
| 1997–98 | Chico Fletcher | Arkansas State | PG | Sophomore | |
| 1998–99 | Chico Fletcher (2) | Arkansas State | PG | Junior | |
| 1999–00 | Gerrod Henderson | Louisiana Tech | SG | Sophomore | |
| 2000–01 | Chris Marcus | Western Kentucky | C | Junior | |
| 2001–02 | Héctor Romero | New Orleans | SF | Junior | |
| 2002–03 | James Moore | New Mexico State | F | Junior | |
| 2003–04 | Mike Wells | Western Kentucky | SG / PG | Senior | |
| 2004–05 | Yemi Nicholson | Denver | C | Junior | |
| 2005–06 | Anthony Winchester | Western Kentucky | SG | Senior | |
| 2006–07 | Bo McCalebb | New Orleans | PG | Junior | |
| 2007–08 | Courtney Lee | Western Kentucky | SG | Senior | |
| 2008–09 | Orlando Méndez-Valdez | Western Kentucky | PG | Senior | |
| 2009–10 | Tyren Johnson | Louisiana | PF | Senior | |
| 2010–11 | Solomon Bozeman | Little Rock | SG | Senior | |
| 2011–12 | LaRon Dendy | Middle Tennessee | PF | Senior | |
| 2012–13 | Augustine Rubit | South Alabama | PF / C | Junior | |
| 2013–14 | R. J. Hunter | Georgia State | SG | Sophomore | |
| 2014–15 | R. J. Hunter (2) | Georgia State | SG | Junior | |
| 2015–16 | Shawn Long | Louisiana | PF | Senior | |
| 2016–17 | Kevin Hervey | UT Arlington | PF | Junior | |
| 2017–18 | D'Marcus Simonds | Georgia State | SG | Sophomore | |
| 2018–19 | Tookie Brown | Georgia Southern | PG | Senior | |
| 2019–20 | Nijal Pearson | Texas State | SG | Senior | |
| 2020–21 | DeVante' Jones | Coastal Carolina | SG | Junior | |
| 2021–22 | Norchad Omier | Arkansas State | PF | Sophomore | |
| 2022–23 | Taevion Kinsey | Marshall | SG | Senior | |
| 2023–24 | Terrence Edwards Jr. | James Madison | SG | Senior | |
| 2024–25 | Tayton Conerway | Troy | PG | Senior | |
| 2025–26 | Chaze Harris | South Alabama | SG | Senior | |

== Winners by school ==
| School (year joined) | Winners | Years |
|---|---|---|
| South Alabama (1976) | 7 | 1979, 1981, 1984, 1985, 1989, 2013, 2026 |
| Western Kentucky (1982) (Note: Western Kentucky left for Conference USA (CUSA) in 2014.) | 7 | 1987, 1995, 2001, 2004, 2006, 2008, 2009 |
| Arkansas State (1991) | 4 | 1994^{†}, 1998, 1999, 2022 |
| New Orleans (1976) (Note: New Orleans left in 1980 but later rejoined in 1991. It left a second time in 2010, planning to transition to NCAA Division II. The Privateers instead chose to remain in Division I, and joined the Southland Conference in 2013. The university's name and athletic identity changed to LSU New Orleans in 2026.) | 4 | 1978, 1993, 2002, 2007 |
| Georgia State (1976/2013) (Note: Georgia State, a charter member of the conference, left in 1981 to become independent. After later having been members of two other conferences, the Panthers rejoined the SBC in 2013.) | 3 | 2014, 2015, 2018 |
| Little Rock (1991) (Note: Little Rock left in 2022 for the Ohio Valley Conference, and moved to the United Athletic Conference in 2026.) | 3 | 1996, 1997, 2011 |
| Louisiana (1991) | 3 | 1994^{†}, 2010, 2016 |
| Old Dominion (1982/2022) (Note: Old Dominion left in 1991 to join what is now the Coastal Athletic Association (CAA). After later moving to CUSA, the Monarchs returned to the SBC in 2022.) | 3 | 1986, 1990, 1991 |
| Charlotte (1976) (Note: Charlotte left in 1991 for the Metro Conference (not to be confused with the current Metro Conference). It became a charter member of CUSA when the Metro merged with the Great Midwest Conference, and still later moved to the Atlantic 10 Conference (A-10), by which time it had adopted "Charlotte" as its athletic identity. The 49ers rejoined CUSA in 2013, and joined what is now the American Conference (American) in 2023.) | 2 | 1977, 1988 |
| Louisiana Tech (1991/2026) (Note: Louisiana Tech left in 2001 to join the Western Athletic Conference (WAC), and joined CUSA in 2013. It rejoined the SBC in 2026.) | 2 | 1992, 2000 |
| Coastal Carolina (2016) | 1 | 2021 |
| Denver (1999) (Note: Denver left in 2012 for the WAC, and has since changed conferences twice—first to the Summit League in 2013, and most recently to the West Coast Conference in 2026.) | 1 | 2005 |
| Georgia Southern (2014) | 1 | 2019 |
| Jacksonville (1976) (Note: Jacksonville left in 1998 for the Trans America Athletic Conference, now known as the Atlantic Sun Conference.) | 1 | 1980 |
| James Madison (2022) | 1 | 2024 |
| Marshall (2022) | 1 | 2023 |
| Middle Tennessee (2001) (Note: FIU, Florida Atlantic, Middle Tennessee, and North Texas all joined CUSA in 2013. Florida Atlantic and North Texas moved to the American in 2023.) | 1 | 2012 |
| New Mexico State (2001) (Note: New Mexico State left in 2005 to join the WAC, and moved to CUSA in 2023.) | 1 | 2003 |
| South Florida (1976) (Note: South Florida left in 1991 for the Metro Conference (the CUSA predecessor, not the current conference of that name). The Bulls are now in the American.) | 1 | 1983^{†} |
| Texas State (2013) (Note: Texas State joined the Pac-12 Conference in 2026.) | 1 | 2020 |
| Troy (2005) | 1 | 2025 |
| UAB (1979) (Note: UAB left in 1991 for the Great Midwest. The Blazers became charter members of CUSA, remaining there until joining the American in 2023.) | 1 | 1982 |
| UT Arlington (2013) (Note: UT Arlington left for the Western Athletic Conference in 2022. The WAC rebranded as the United Athletic Conference in 2026 with UTA as a continuing member.) | 1 | 2017 |
| VCU (1979) (Note: VCU left in 1991 to join the CAA, and moved from there to the A-10 in 2012.) | 1 | 1983^{†} |
| Appalachian State (2014) | 0 | — |
| Florida Atlantic (2006) | 0 | — |
| FIU (1998) | 0 | — |
| Louisiana–Monroe (2001) | 0 | — |
| North Texas (2001) | 0 | — |
| Southern Miss (2022) | 0 | — |
