= 1988–89 South Alabama Jaguars basketball team =

American college basketball season

1988–89 South Alabama Jaguars men's basketball

Sun Belt Regular season champions Sun Belt tournament champions

NCAA tournament, second round
- Conference: Sun Belt Conference
- East Division
- Record: 23–9 (11–3 Sun Belt)
- Head coach: Ronnie Arrow (2nd season)
- Home arena: Mitchell Center

1988–89 Sun Belt Conference men's basketball standings
	Conf.				Overall
Team	W		L	PCT	W		L	PCT
South Alabama †	11	–	3	.786	23	–	9	.719
UNC Charlotte	10	–	4	.714	17	–	12	.586
VCU	9	–	5	.643	13	–	15	.464
UAB	8	–	6	.571	22	–	12	.647
Old Dominion	7	–	7	.500	15	–	13	.536
Jacksonville	5	–	9	.357	14	–	16	.467
Western Kentucky	4	–	10	.286	14	–	15	.483
South Florida	2	–	12	.143	7	–	21	.250
† 1989 Sun Belt Conference tournament winner Rankings from AP Poll

The 1988–89 South Alabama Jaguars basketball team represented the University of South Alabama during the 1988–89 NCAA Division I men's basketball season. The Jaguars were led by head coach Ronnie Arrow, in the second year of his first stint as head coach. They played their home games at the Mobile Civic Center, and were members of the Sun Belt Conference. They finished the season 23–9, 11–3 in Sun Belt play to finish in first place. They won the Sun Belt tournament to earn an automatic bid to the 1989 NCAA tournament as the 11 seed in the Southeast region. In the opening round, the Jaguars upset Alabama before losing to the eventual National champion, Michigan, in the second round.

== Roster ==
1988–89 South Alabama Jaguars men's basketball team
Players
Coaches

Pos.	#	Name	Height	Weight	Year	Hometown
G		Jeff Hodge	6 ft 3 in (1.91 m)	175 lb (79 kg)	Sr	Birmingham, Alabama
G		Junie Lewis	6 ft 3 in (1.91 m)	180 lb (82 kg)	Sr	Abington, Pennsylvania
F		Gabriel Estaba	6 ft 7 in (2.01 m)	—	So
G		Terrance Brodnick	5 ft 10 in (1.78 m)	—	Sr
F		John Jimmerson	6 ft 5 in (1.96 m)	—	Jr
F		Neil Smith	6 ft 6 in (1.98 m)	—	So
G		Derek Turner	6 ft 2 in (1.88 m)	—	Fr
C		Phillip Darden	6 ft 8 in (2.03 m)	—	Jr
G		Dennis Rhodes	5 ft 7 in (1.7 m)	—	Sr
G		Darrell Nelson	6 ft 4 in (1.93 m)	—	Jr
F		James Neal	6 ft 7 in (2.01 m)	—	Sr
F		Michael Hurring	6 ft 9 in (2.06 m)	—	So
F		Scott Zimos	6 ft 6 in (1.98 m)	—	Fr

Head coach

- Ronnie Arrow (Texas State)

Assistant coach(es)

Legend

- (C) Team captain
- (S) Suspended
- (I) Ineligible
- (W) Walk-on
- Injured
- Current redshirt

== Schedule and results ==
Date time, TV	Rank^{#}	Opponent^{#}	Result	Record	Site (attendance) city, state
Regular season
Nov 25, 1988*		vs. Fairfield	W 70–50	1–0	Providence Civic Center; Providence, Rhode Island
Nov 26, 1988*		at Providence	L 88–93 ^{OT}	1–1	Providence Civic Center; Providence, Rhode Island
Dec 3, 1988*		Coastal Carolina	W 88–65	2–1	Jaguar Gym; Mobile, Alabama
Dec 7, 1988*		at Marshall	L 110–111	2–2	Cam Henderson Center; Huntington, West Virginia
Dec 10, 1988*		at New Orleans	W 69–64 ^{OT}	3–2	Lakefront Arena; New Orleans, Louisiana
Dec 14, 1988*		at No. 12 Florida State	L 82–87	3–3	Tallahassee-Leon County Civic Center; Tallahassee, Florida
Dec 22, 1988*		Stephen F. Austin	W 108–69	4–3	Jaguar Gym; Mobile, Alabama
Dec 30, 1988*		at Southwestern Louisiana	W 86–69	5–3	Cajundome; Lafayette, Louisiana
Jan 2, 1989*		vs. Arkansas	L 71–103	5–4	Pine Bluff Convention Center (5,260); Pine Bluff, Arkansas
Jan 8, 1989		Western Kentucky	W 87–74	6–4 (1–0)	Jaguar Gym; Mobile, Alabama
Jan 11, 1989*		Alabama State	W 104–84	7–4	Jaguar Gym; Mobile, Alabama
Jan 15, 1989		UNC Charlotte	W 97–83	8–4 (2–0)	Jaguar Gym; Mobile, Alabama
Jan 18, 1989		UAB	W 114–84	9–4 (3–0)	Jaguar Gym; Mobile, Alabama
Jan 21, 1989		at UNC Charlotte	L 70–72	9–5 (3–1)	Bojangles Coliseum; Charlotte, North Carolina
Jan 23, 1989		Jacksonville	W 103–74	10–5 (4–1)	Jaguar Gym; Mobile, Alabama
Jan 26, 1989		at Old Dominion	W 82–75	11–5 (5–1)	Norfolk Scope; Norfolk, Virginia
Jan 31, 1989		VCU	W 95–91	12–5 (6–1)	Jaguar Gym; Mobile, Alabama
Feb 6, 1989		at VCU	L 81–85	12–6 (6–2)	Richmond Coliseum; Richmond, Virginia
Feb 9, 1989*		at Southern Miss	L 92–94	12–7	Reed Green Coliseum; Hattiesburg, Mississippi
Feb 11, 1989		at UAB	L 91–93	12–8 (6–3)	UAB Arena; Birmingham, Alabama
Feb 13, 1989		South Florida	W 96–70	13–8 (7–3)	Jaguar Gym; Mobile, Alabama
Feb 16, 1989		at Western Kentucky	W 96–92 ^{OT}	14–8 (8–3)	E. A. Diddle Arena; Bowling Green, Kentucky
Feb 18, 1989*; 7:05 p.m.		UMKC	W 91–72	15–8	Jaguar Gym (3,375); Mobile, Alabama
Feb 21, 1989		Old Dominion	W 92–81	16–8 (9–3)	Jaguar Gym; Mobile, Alabama
Feb 23, 1989		at South Florida	W 96–84	17–8 (10–3)	USF Sun Dome; Tampa, Florida
Feb 25, 1989		at Jacksonville	W 93–78	18–8 (11–3)	Jacksonville Memorial Coliseum; Jacksonville, Florida
Mar 1, 1989*		Nicholls State	W 116–66	19–8	Jaguar Gym; Mobile, Alabama
Sun Belt Conference tournament
Mar 4, 1989*	(1)	vs. (8) South Florida; Sun Belt Tournament Quarterfinal	W 70–65	20–8	Charlotte Coliseum; Charlotte, North Carolina
Mar 5, 1989*	(1)	vs. (4) UAB; Sun Belt Tournament Semifinal	W 103–84	21–8	Charlotte Coliseum; Charlotte, North Carolina
Mar 6, 1989*	(1)	vs. (6) Jacksonville; Sun Belt tournament championship	W 105–59	22–8	Charlotte Coliseum; Charlotte, North Carolina
NCAA tournament
Mar 17, 1989*	(11 SE)	vs. (6 SE) No. 20 Alabama; First Round	W 86–84	23–8	Omni Coliseum; Atlanta, Georgia
Mar 19, 1989*	(11 SE)	vs. (3 SE) No. 10 Michigan; Second Round	L 82–91	23–9	Omni Coliseum; Atlanta, Georgia
*Non-conference game. ^{#}Rankings from AP Poll. (#) Tournament seedings in parentheses. SE=Southeast. All times are in Central Time.

== NBA draft ==
Round	Pick	Player	NBA Club
2	48	Junie Lewis	Utah Jazz
2	53	Jeff Hodge	Dallas Mavericks
