= 1988–89 UAB Blazers men's basketball team =

American college basketball season

1988–89 UAB Blazers men's basketball

NIT, third place
- Conference: Sun Belt Conference
- Record: 22–12 (8–6 Sun Belt)
- Head coach: Gene Bartow (11th season)
- Home arena: UAB Arena

1988–89 Sun Belt Conference men's basketball standings
	Conf.				Overall
Team	W		L	PCT	W		L	PCT
South Alabama †	11	–	3	.786	23	–	9	.719
UNC Charlotte	10	–	4	.714	17	–	12	.586
VCU	9	–	5	.643	13	–	15	.464
UAB	8	–	6	.571	22	–	12	.647
Old Dominion	7	–	7	.500	15	–	13	.536
Jacksonville	5	–	9	.357	14	–	16	.467
Western Kentucky	4	–	10	.286	14	–	15	.483
South Florida	2	–	12	.143	7	–	21	.250
† 1989 Sun Belt Conference tournament winner Rankings from AP Poll

The 1988–89 UAB Blazers men's basketball team represented the University of Alabama at Birmingham as a member of the Sun Belt Conference during the 1988–89 NCAA Division I men's basketball season. This was head coach Gene Bartow's 11th season at UAB, and the Blazers played their home games at UAB Arena. They finished the season 22–12, 8–6 in Sun Belt play and lost in the semifinals of the Sun Belt tournament. Michigan State received a bid to the National Invitation Tournament where they beat Georgia Southern, Richmond, and Connecticut to reach the semifinals at Madison Square Garden. In the semifinals, they lost to St. John's. In the third place game, they won against Michigan State in overtime.

== Roster ==
1988–89 UAB Blazers men's basketball team
Players
Coaches

Pos.	#	Name	Height	Weight	Year	Hometown
G	3	Barry Bearden	5 ft 11 in (1.8 m)	175 lb (79 kg)	Jr	Birmingham, Alabama
G	13	Andy Kennedy	6 ft 8 in (2.03 m)	195 lb (88 kg)	So	Louisville, Mississippi
G	15	JJ Smith	5 ft 11 in (1.8 m)	170 lb (77 kg)	Fr	Memphis, Tennessee
G	22	Jack Kramer	6 ft 3 in (1.91 m)	195 lb (88 kg)	So	Quincy, Illinois
G	23	Elbert Rogers	6 ft 7 in (2.01 m)	240 lb (109 kg)	Fr	Pascagoula, Mississippi
F	25	Keelon Lawson	6 ft 6 in (1.98 m)	190 lb (86 kg)	Fr	Memphis, Tennessee
F	34	Dylan Howard	6 ft 7 in (2.01 m)	215 lb (98 kg)	Sr	Fort Wayne, Indiana
G	35	Tony Lewis	6 ft 3 in (1.91 m)	185 lb (84 kg)	Fr	Memphis, Tennessee
F	40	Larry Rembert	6 ft 8 in (2.03 m)	240 lb (109 kg)	Jr	Orrville, Alabama
F	50	Doug Turner	6 ft 11 in (2.11 m)	200 lb (91 kg)	Fr	Knob Noster, Missouri
C	53	Alan Ogg	7 ft 2 in (2.18 m)	220 lb (100 kg)	Jr	Mount Olive, Alabama
F	55	Bruce Baker	6 ft 7 in (2.01 m)	195 lb (88 kg)	Sr	Benton, Illinois

Head coach

- Gene Bartow

Assistant coach(es)

Legend

- (C) Team captain
- (S) Suspended
- (I) Ineligible
- (W) Walk-on
- Injured
- Current redshirt

Roster
Last update: September 2, 2025

== Schedule and results ==
Date time, TV	Rank^{#}	Opponent^{#}	Result	Record	Site (attendance) city, state
Regular season
Nov 28, 1988*		at Hawaii Pacific	W 86–63	1–0	Neal S. Blaisdell Center; Kaneohe, Hawaii
Dec 3, 1988*		Vanderbilt	W 76–69	2–0	Bartow Arena; Birmingham, Alabama
Dec 8, 1988*		Alabama State	W 87–85	3–0	Bartow Arena; Birmingham, Alabama
Dec 10, 1988*		at Wyoming	L 91–109	3–1	Arena-Auditorium; Laramie, Wyoming
Dec 16, 1988*		Florida A&M; UAB Classic	W 93–56	4–1	Bartow Arena; Birmingham, Alabama
Dec 17, 1988*		Louisiana Tech; UAB Classic	W 97–79	5–1	Bartow Arena; Birmingham, Alabama
Dec 20, 1988*		vs. No. 19 Tennessee; McDonald's Classic	L 99–111	5–2	Peterson Gymnasium; San Diego, California
Dec 21, 1988*		vs. Hardin-Simmons; McDonald's Classic	W 72–50	6–2	Peterson Gymnasium; San Diego, California
Dec 26, 1988*		Long Beach State	W 90–75	7–2	Bartow Arena; Birmingham, Alabama
Dec 29, 1988*		vs. Kent State; Coca-Cola Classic	L 66–75	7–3	Chattanooga, Tennessee
Dec 30, 1988*		vs. Tennessee State; Coca-Cola Classic	W 84–56	8–3	Chattanooga, Tennessee
Jan 7, 1989		at Old Dominion	L 89–101	8–4 (0–1)	Norfolk Scope; Norfolk, Virginia
Jan 10, 1989		Western Kentucky	W 76–60	9–4 (1–1)	Bartow Arena; Birmingham, Alabama
Jan 14, 1989		at South Florida	W 73–61	10–4 (2–1)	USF Sun Dome; Tampa, Florida
Jan 16, 1989		Jacksonville	W 93–86	11–4 (3–1)	Bartow Arena; Birmingham, Alabama
Jan 18, 1989		at South Alabama	L 84–114	11–5 (3–2)	Jaguar Gym; Mobile, Alabama
Jan 26, 1989		at VCU	L 75–79	11–6 (3–3)	Richmond Coliseum; Richmond, Virginia
Jan 28, 1989		UNC Charlotte	L 72–86	11–7 (3–4)	Bartow Arena; Birmingham, Alabama
Feb 4, 1989		Old Dominion	W 92–77	12–7 (4–4)	Bartow Arena; Birmingham, Alabama
Feb 9, 1989		at Western Kentucky	W 80–70	13–7 (5–4)	E. A. Diddle Arena; Bowling Green, Kentucky
Feb 11, 1989		South Alabama	W 93–91	14–7 (6–4)	Bartow Arena; Birmingham, Alabama
Feb 15, 1989*		at Bradley	L 90–96	14–8	Carver Arena; Peoria, Illinois
Feb 18, 1989		at Jacksonville	L 79–98	14–9 (6–5)	Jacksonville Memorial Coliseum; Jacksonville, Florida
Feb 21, 1989		South Florida	W 87–59	15–9 (7–5)	Bartow Arena; Birmingham, Alabama
Feb 23, 1989		VCU	W 78–62	16–9 (8–5)	Bartow Arena; Birmingham, Alabama
Feb 25, 1989*		Auburn	W 105–76	17–9	BJCC Coliseum; Birmingham, Alabama
Feb 27, 1989		at UNC Charlotte	L 74–76	17–10 (8–6)	Bojangles Coliseum; Charlotte, North Carolina
Sun Belt tournament
Mar 4, 1989*	(4)	vs. (5) Old Dominion; Quarterfinals	W 89–87 ^{OT}	18–10	Charlotte Coliseum; Charlotte, North Carolina
Mar 5, 1989*	(4)	vs. (1) South Alabama; Semifinals	L 84–103	18–11	Charlotte Coliseum; Charlotte, North Carolina
NIT
Mar 16, 1989*		Georgia Southern; First round	W 83–74	19–11	Bartow Arena; Birmingham, Alabama
Mar 20, 1989*		at Richmond; Second round	W 64–61	20–11	Robins Center; Richmond, Virginia
Mar 22, 1989*		at Connecticut; Quarterfinals	W 85–79	21–11	Hugh S. Greer Field House (4,604); Storrs, Connecticut
Mar 27, 1989*		vs. St. John's; Semifinals	L 65–76	21–12	Madison Square Garden; New York, New York
Mar 29, 1989*		vs. Michigan State; Third place game	W 78–76 ^{OT}	22–12	Madison Square Garden; New York, New York
*Non-conference game. ^{#}Rankings from AP poll. (#) Tournament seedings in parentheses. E=East. All times are in Central Time.
