= Tookie Brown =

American basketball player

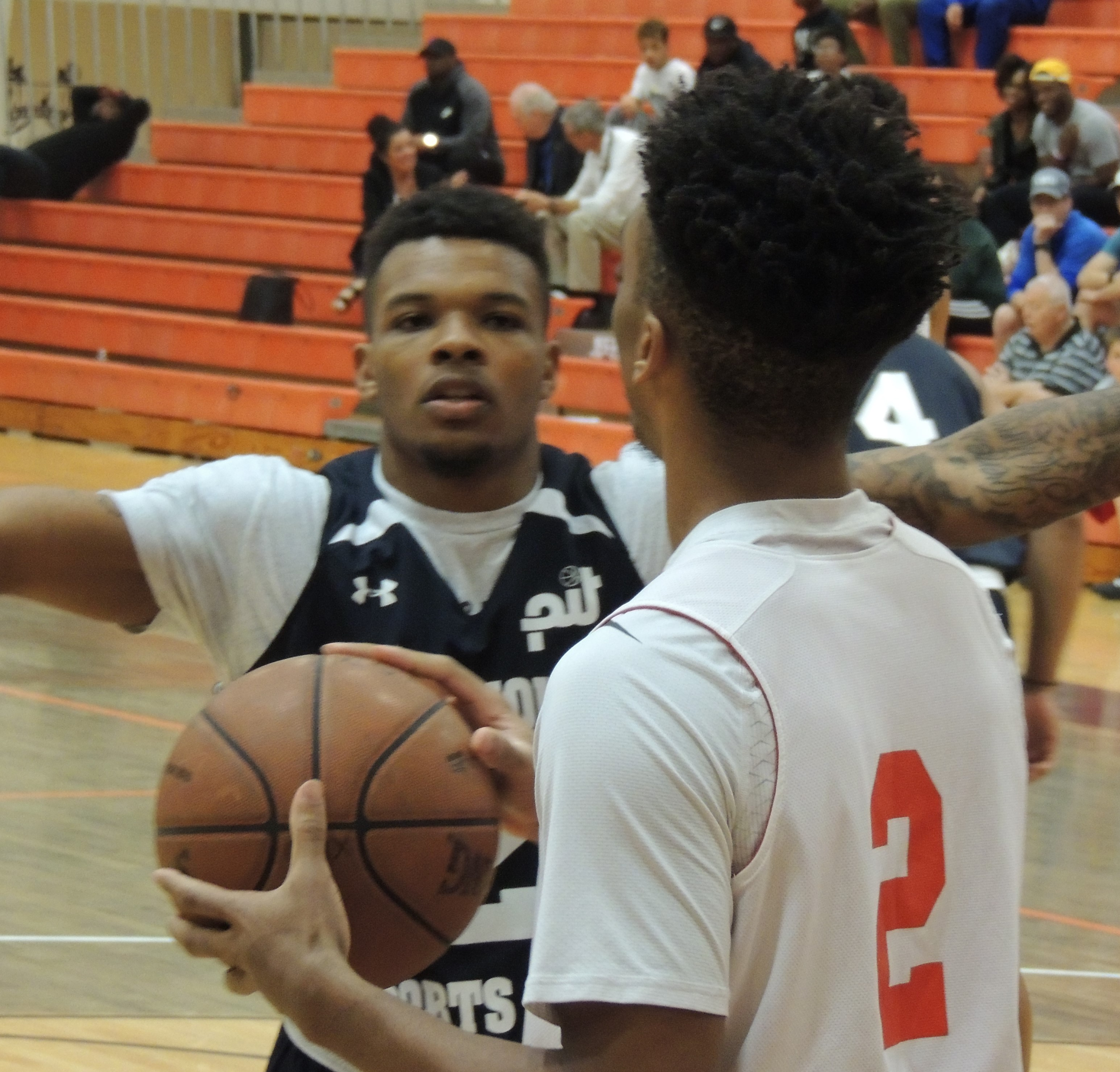
- Brown at the Portsmouth Invitational Tournament in April 2019

Neftçi SC Baku
- Position: Point guard
- League: Azerbaijan Basketball League

Personal information
- Born: November 22, 1995 (age 30) Augusta, Georgia, U.S.
- Listed height: 5 ft 11 in (1.80 m)
- Listed weight: 180 lb (82 kg)

Career information
- High school: Morgan County (Madison, Georgia)
- College: Georgia Southern (2015–2019)
- NBA draft: 2019: undrafted
- Playing career: 2019–present

Career history
- 2019–2020: Limburg United
- 2020–2021: Wilki Morskie Szczecin
- 2021–2022: Basketball Löwen Braunschweig
- 2023: Lakeland Magic
- 2023–2024: AEK Larnaca
- 2024–2025: Juventus Utena
- 2025-present: Neftçi SC Baku

Career highlights
- Cypriot Cup winner (2023); Cypriot League All-Star (2023); Sun Belt Player of the Year (2019); 4× First-team All-Sun Belt (2016–2019); Sun Belt Freshman of the Year (2016)

Quindarious Deavundre "Tookie" Brown (born November 22, 1995) is an American professional basketball player. He played college basketball for the Georgia Southern University and was named the 2019 Sun Belt Conference Player of the Year.

== College career ==
Brown went to Georgia Southern from Morgan County High School in Madison, Georgia, where he scored over 3,000 points and led the school to its first state title. He originally committed to Mississippi State, but withdrew his commitment when the Bulldogs experienced a coaching change. He immediately made an impact for the Eagles, averaging 17.8 points, 3.4 assists and 3.2 rebounds, earning Sun Belt Conference Freshman of the Year honors and a spot on the All-Sun Belt first team. Brown declared for the 2018 NBA draft, later opting to return for his senior season.

Brown would go on to have perhaps the most decorated career in Georgia Southern program history. He is the first player to receive first-team All-Sun Belt Conference honors four times, and became the Eagles' all-time leading Division I scorer early in his senior season. On January 17, 2019, Brown scored his 2,000th career point. At the close of his senior year, Brown became the first Eagle to be named Sun Belt Player of the Year.

== Professional career ==
After going undrafted in the 2019 NBA draft, Brown signed his first professional contract with Limburg United of the Belgian Pro Basketball League. He opted to return to the United States after the season was cancelled on March 13, 2020.

On December 20, 2020, he signed with Wilki Morskie Szczecin of the PLK.

On August 1, 2021, he signed with Basketball Löwen Braunschweig of the German Pro Basketball League.

=== Lakeland Magic (2023) ===
On January 1, 2023, Brown was acquired by the Lakeland Magic. Brown was waived later that same day.
