= LaRon Dendy =

American basketball player (born 1988)

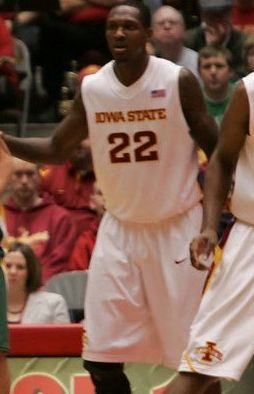
- Dendy in 2010

Personal information
- Born: December 18, 1988 (age 37) Greenville, South Carolina, U.S.
- Listed height: 6 ft 9 in (2.06 m)
- Listed weight: 230 lb (104 kg)

Career information
- High school: Greer (Greer, South Carolina); Hope Christian Academy (Asheville, North Carolina)
- College: Indian Hills CC (2007–2009); Iowa State (2009–2010); Middle Tennessee (2011–2012)
- NBA draft: 2012: undrafted
- Playing career: 2012–2021
- Position: Power forward / center

Career history
- 2012–2013: Kolossos Rodou
- 2013: Darüşşafaka
- 2013–2014: Ferro-ZNTU
- 2014–2015: Melikşah Üniversitesi
- 2015–2016: Fos Provence
- 2016–2017: Düzce Belediyesi
- 2017: Hapoel Tel Aviv
- 2017–2018: Juventus Utena
- 2018–2019: Donar
- 2019–2020: APOEL
- 2020–2021: Kharkivski Sokoly
- 2021: Peja

Career highlights
- Cypriot League All-Star (2019); Sun Belt Player of the Year (2012); AP Honorable mention All-American (2012); First-team All-Sun Belt (2012)

LaRon Dendy (born December 18, 1988) is an American former basketball player. Dendy was an All-American college player at Middle Tennessee State University before beginning his professional career in 2012.

== Career ==
Dendy, a 6 ft 9 in (2.06 m) power forward and center from Greenville, South Carolina, originally committed to Clemson. He instead went to Indian Hills Community College and played two years for the NJCAA school. He then went to Iowa State for the 2009–10 season, where he averaged 7.2 points and 3.6 rebounds per game in a reserve role. Following the season, Dendy announced plans to transfer.

With one year of college eligibility left, Dendy landed at Middle Tennessee. He had a strong year, averaging 14.6 points and 7.1 rebounds per game and leading the Blue Raiders to the Sun Belt Conference regular season title. He was rewarded with the Sun Belt Conference Men's Basketball Player of the Year and an Associated Press honorable mention All-American designation.

Following the close of his college career, Dendy went undrafted in the 2012 NBA draft. After playing in the Washington Wizards' Summer League team, he signed with Kolossos Rodou of the Greek Basket League. He finished the season with Darüşşafaka of the Turkish Basketball League.

On April 24, 2017, Dendy signed with Hapoel Tel Aviv. On December 28, 2018, Dendy signed with Donar of the Dutch Basketball League. He played there for one and a half months and had to leave the team in February 2019.

== The Basketball Tournament ==
LaRon Dendy played for Team Fancy in the 2018 edition of The Basketball Tournament. In 2 games, he averaged 5 points, 4 rebounds, and shot 43 percent from the field. Team Fancy reached the second round before falling to Boeheim's Army.
