= Ron Ellis (basketball) =

American basketball player (born 1968)

Personal information
- Born: September 18, 1968 (age 58) Monroe, Louisiana, U.S.
- Listed height: 6 ft 7 in (2.01 m)
- Listed weight: 215 lb (98 kg)

Career information
- High school: Rayville (Rayville, Louisiana)
- College: Tyler JC (1988–1990); Louisiana Tech (1990–1992)
- NBA draft: 1992: 2nd round, 49th overall pick
- Drafted by: Phoenix Suns
- Playing career: 1992–2007
- Position: Power forward

Career history
- 1992–1993: Fort Wayne Fury
- 1993: Rochester Renegade
- 1993–1999: Spirou Charleroi
- 1999–2000: Iraklis B.C.
- 2000–2004: Spirou Charleroi
- 2004–2005: Antwerp Giants
- 2005–2007: Liège

Career highlights
- Sun Belt Player of the Year (1992); First-team All-Sun Belt (1992)
- Stats at Basketball Reference

Ron Ellis (born September 18, 1968) is an American former basketball player. He was a standout college player at Louisiana Tech University, a second round NBA draft pick and played professionally for 15 years.

== College career ==
Ellis, a 6'7" power forward from Rayville, Louisiana, played collegiately for Tyler Junior College and Louisiana Tech. As a senior in the 1991–92 season, Ellis averaged 15.7 points and 7.7 rebounds per game and was named Sun Belt Conference Player of the Year.

== Professional career ==
Following the close of his college career, Ellis was drafted in the second round of the 1992 NBA draft (49th pick overall) by the Phoenix Suns, however he did not play in the league. He spent the 1992–93 season in the Continental Basketball Association, averaging 11.3 points and 5.5 rebounds per game for the Fort Wayne Fury and Rochester Renegade. He played briefly in Greece and for several years in Belgium (mostly for Spirou Charleroi), ultimately obtaining Belgian citizenship.
