= Solomon Bozeman =

American basketball player and coach (born 1987)

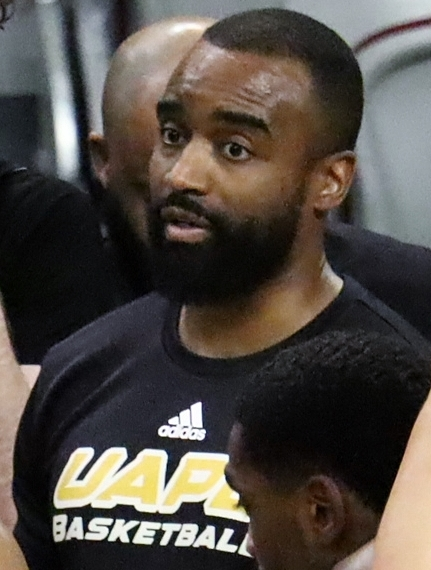
- Bozeman with Arkansas–Pine Bluff in 2023

Arkansas–Pine Bluff Golden Lions
- Title: Head coach
- League: Southwestern Athletic Conference

Personal information
- Born: December 18, 1987 (age 38) Little Rock, Arkansas, U.S.
- Listed height: 6 ft 1 in (1.85 m)
- Listed weight: 174 lb (79 kg)

Career information
- High school: Oxford (Oxford, Mississippi); Magnolia (Magnolia, Arkansas)
- College: South Florida (2006–2008); Little Rock (2009–2011)
- NBA draft: 2011: undrafted
- Playing career: 2011–2014
- Position: Point guard
- Coaching career: 2014–present

Career history

Playing
- 2011–2012: Austin Toros
- 2012: KK Feni Industries
- 2012: BC Kalev
- 2012: Hapoel Yokneam/Megido
- 2012–2013: Texas Legends
- 2013: Kryvbas
- 2014: Al Sadd Doha

Coaching
- 2014–2016: Abilene Christian (assistant)
- 2016–2018: Little Rock (assistant)
- 2018–2021: Oral Roberts (assistant)
- 2021–present: Arkansas–Pine Bluff

Career highlights
- Sun Belt Player of the Year (2011); First-team All-Sun Belt (2011); AP honorable mention All-American (2011)

Solomon Bozeman (born December 18, 1987) is an American former professional basketball player and current head coach for the University of Arkansas at Pine Bluff. He played college basketball for the University of South Florida and the University of Arkansas at Little Rock.

== High school career ==
Bozeman, son of a college coach, starred at Oxford High School in Oxford, Mississippi for three years as his father served as an assistant at Ole Miss. In 2005, his father was named the head coach at Southern Arkansas University and Solomon played his senior season at Magnolia High School in Magnolia, Arkansas. In his senior season, he averaged 28.5 points per game and led the school to the Arkansas state championship game.

== College career ==
Out of high school, Bozeman signed with South Florida. As a freshman in the 2006–07 season, he averaged 9.6 points and 3.5 assists in 30.6 minutes per game. In his sophomore season, Bozeman saw a coaching change and also saw his minutes per game drop. At the conclusion of the season, he decided to transfer to Arkansas–Little Rock (UALR).

At UALR, Bozeman was a two-year starter. As a senior in 2010–11, Bozeman averaged 16.6 points per game and led the Trojans to their first NCAA tournament bid in 21 years. UALR defeated North Texas in the Sun Belt Conference tournament championship. Bozeman scored 20 points in the final, including the game-winner, and was named Most Valuable Player of the tournament. For the regular season, he was named the Sun Belt Conference Player of the Year and an honorable mention All-American by the Associated Press.

== Professional career ==
After his college career, Bozeman was not selected in the 2011 NBA draft, but he was taken in the fifth round of the 2011 NBA Development League Draft by the Austin Toros. He started his professional career in Austin, averaging 8 points per game in 12 contests. He spent the rest of the season moving between teams in the Republic of Macedonia, Estonia and Israel. Bozeman returned to the D-League's Texas Legends. He averaged 8.4 points per game for the 2012–13 season.

For the 2013–14 season, Bozeman signed with Kryvbas of the Ukrainian SuperLeague. In January 2014, he was waived by Kryvbas.

== Coaching career ==
In June 2014, Bozeman was hired as an assistant coach at Abilene Christian under former Little Rock assistant coach Joe Golding.

On April 19, 2016, Bozeman returned to Little Rock as an assistant coach under new head coach Wes Flanigan.

Bozeman was named head coach of Arkansas–Pine Bluff on June 11, 2021.

== Head coaching record ==
Record table
Season	Team	Overall	Conference	Standing	Postseason
Arkansas–Pine Bluff Golden Lions (Southwestern Athletic Conference) (2021–present)
2021–22	Arkansas–Pine Bluff	7–24	5–13	11th	
2022–23	Arkansas–Pine Bluff	10–21	6–12	T–9th	
2023–24	Arkansas–Pine Bluff	13–18	8–10	T–8th	
2024–25	Arkansas–Pine Bluff	6–25	3–15	11th	
2025–26	Arkansas–Pine Bluff	13–19	10–8	T–4th	
2026–27	Arkansas–Pine Bluff	0–0	0–0		
Arkansas–Pine Bluff:		49–107 (.314)	32–58 (.356)		
Total:		49–107 (.314)			
National champion Postseason invitational champion Conference regular season champion Conference regular season and conference tournament champion Division regular season champion Division regular season and conference tournament champion Conference tournament champion
