= Adonis Jordan =

American basketball player (born 1970)

Personal information
- Born: August 21, 1970 (age 56) Brooklyn, New York, U.S.
- Listed height: 5 ft 11 in (1.80 m)
- Listed weight: 170 lb (77 kg)

Career information
- High school: Roosevelt (Yonkers, New York); Cleveland (Reseda, California)
- College: Kansas (1989–1993)
- NBA draft: 1993: 2nd round, 42nd overall pick
- Drafted by: Seattle SuperSonics
- Playing career: 1993–2010
- Position: Point guard
- Number: 1, 11

Career history
- 1993: Denver Nuggets
- 1993: Rochester Renegade
- 1994: Sioux Falls Skyforce
- 1994–1995: South-East Melbourne Magic
- 1995–1996: Maccabi Jerusalem
- 1997: Cocodrilos de Caracas
- 1997–1998: Winlinkg
- 1998: Kwangju Nasan Flamans BC
- 1999: Milwaukee Bucks
- 1999–2000: Tapiolan Honka
- 2002: Townsville Crocodiles
- 2001–2002: ASGE
- 2002–2003: Victoria Giants
- 2010: Chelsea Gulls

Career highlights
- All-NBL Third Team (1995); First-team All-Big Eight (1992)
- Stats at NBA.com
- Stats at Basketball Reference
Medals
Men's basketball
Representing United States
Summer Universiade
Gold medal – first place	1991 Sheffield	National team

Adonis Adelecino Jordan (born August 21, 1970) is an American former professional basketball player. An All-Big Eight guard who played collegiately at the University of Kansas, Jordan was the starting point guard during the school's 1991 and 1993 Final Four appearances. Together with shooting guard teammate Rex Walters, the two established Kansas as having one of the top backcourts in the NCAA during the 1992–93 season. He was later drafted in the 1993 NBA draft but only appeared in only 10 career games in the league (six with the Denver Nuggets during the 1993–94 season and four with the Milwaukee Bucks during the lockout-shortened 1999 NBA season). He spent the bulk of his professional career playing overseas with various basketball clubs.

== Early life ==
Adonis Jordan was born as the fourth son to Josephine Jordan in Brooklyn, New York. His mother named her son after the Greek mythological character Adonis, a handsome young man who was fabled to be the love interest of the goddess Aphrodite. She worked as a secretary for an insurance company while her son spent his time playing pick-up street basketball on Brooklyn blacktop courts. Jordan was enrolled by his mother at Theodore Roosevelt High School in Yonkers, New York, across town from where she worked. Although the decision necessitated a 45-minute commute each way, she could be assured that her son would receive an education in a safer environment compared to their Brooklyn surroundings. Jordan played high school basketball at Roosevelt High and blossomed in his second year, being one of only two sophomores named to the New York All-City team. However, Jordan's stay in New York was cut short when his mother suddenly decided to relocate to California in 1987 after a two-week visit to see relatives in the state.

I didn't like my name when I was small. People couldn't pronounce it. Kids used to call me 'A Doughnut' to tease me...[b]ut once I got older and realized what it meant–the Greek god of love–I started to like it because it's a unique name. I tell all the girls that I'm named after the Greek god of love.

— Adonis Jordan

Jordan moved from one coast to another and resettled in Los Angeles after his sophomore year in high school. He transferred to Cleveland High School in Reseda and joined future NBA veteran Lucious Harris as stars of the school's varsity basketball team. The New York native was a big factor on the Cleveland High Cavaliers' squad, playing big roles on offense (averaging 13.8 points a game) and defense (averaging 5.9 steals per game) during the 1987–88 season. At the start of his senior year, Jordan was considered by some to be one of the state's top point guards and was named among the nation's 50 top-rated high school seniors by basketball scout Bob Gibbons. He completed his final high school season averaging 24.3 points and 13.4 assists per game, leading the Cavaliers to a 23–3 record and to the quarterfinals of the City Section tournament while earning back-to-back Valley 4-A All-League First Team recognition.

== College career ==
While at Cleveland High, Jordan was heavily recruited by collegiate basketball programs, including the University of Kansas. At the time, Kansas was suffering from NCAA sanctions that stemmed from recruiting violations under former coach Larry Brown. Though the scandal dissuaded other potential high school prospects from attending Kansas, Jordan nonetheless decided to take a chance with the school after he was impressed by the university's friendly and personal atmosphere. In the 1989–90 season, freshman Jordan came off the bench to back up starting Jayhawks point guard Kevin Pritchard. Together they helped lead Kansas to a surprising record of 30–5 under second-year coach Roy Williams. With Pritchard's graduation, Jordan became the starting point guard for the 1990–91 season, leading the 27–8 Kansas Jayhawks to the Final Four during his sophomore year. Jordan averaged 12.5 points and recorded 151 assists that season while the team managed three upset victories in the 1991 NCAA Tournament against Indiana (Sweet Sixteen), the Southeast Regional number one seed Arkansas (Elite Eight) and Eastern Regional number one seed North Carolina (National Semifinals) before finishing as National Runner-up to Duke in the National Championship game.

I'll tell you why I chose Kansas...[i]t was more of a family-type thing there than a business...In Kansas, the people there welcomed me with open arms. Even now, we go to the coach's house, watch TV, his wife cooks dinner. Some teams, once practice is over, everybody goes their own way. At Kansas we do things as a team.

— Adonis Jordan

Two years later, senior Jordan and teammate Rex Walters helped lead the Jayhawks to further success when they captured the 1993 Big Eight Regular Season Championship and the second seed in the Midwest Region of the 1993 NCAA Men's Division I Basketball Tournament with a 25–6 record. Jordan and Walters' stellar backcourt performance earned them a reputation as one of the NCAA's best guard combinations. Kansas marched through the NCAA tournament, beating Midwest Region number one seed Indiana in the Regional Final to advance to the Final Four for the second time in three years. Though Kansas eventually finished at 29–7 with a loss to North Carolina in the Final Four, the team's outstanding performance that year earned the squad a top ten nationwide ranking during the regular season, including a brief time spent at number one. Jordan's legacy with Kansas is also recognized in holding the Jayhawks' number six spot for most assists in the school's history and is 22nd on the school's all-time scoring list.

== Professional career ==
Jordan was drafted by the Seattle SuperSonics in the 1993 NBA draft after a storied basketball career at Kansas. Seattle ended up cutting the rookie at the start of the 1993–94 NBA season but Jordan reemerged in the league after being picked up by the Denver Nuggets later in the month on a 10-day contract. He appeared in six games with Denver before being waived again but finished the season in the CBA with the Rochester Renegades and the Sioux Falls Skyforce. The former Jayhawk headed to Australia in what would become the start of a series of overseas stints. His first stop landed him with the Australian National Basketball League's South East Melbourne Magic, where he led the team to an impressive record in 1994. After playing one season in Israel, Jordan headed to Venezuela where he joined the Cocodrilos de Caracas of the Liga Profesional de Baloncesto. With five years of overseas experience, the globetrotter returned to the States and signed two 10-day contracts with the Milwaukee Bucks in early 1999. He donned a Bucks uniform in four games before ultimately being released in March. Jordan returned overseas later that same year, where he would eventually finish his professional career. He played a season with the Finnish Tapiolan Honka basketball club in 1999–2000 and returned to Australia where he retired after playing for the Victoria Giants. In 2010, Jordan returned to basketball with the Chelsea Gulls of the Big V Division Two, where he averaged 15.4 points in 21 games. Later that year, he became a coach with the Nunawading Spectres.

== Personal life ==
Jordan appeared in the 1994 basketball film, Blue Chips as the starting point guard for a college team called Coast. After retiring from basketball, Jordan accepted an offer to coach the Topeka Tornado of the short-lived semi-pro All-American Professional Basketball League in 2005. He now resides in Victoria, Australia with his daughter.

== Awards and accomplishments ==
- 2x Valley 4-A All-League First Team (1987–88, 1988–89)
- Street & Smith's All-American Honorable Mention (1988)
- U.S. Olympic Festival: Men's Basketball West Team (1989)
- World University Games: United States Men's Basketball (1991)
- AP All-Big Eight Second Team (1990–91)
- AP All-Big Eight First Team (1991–92)
- 1998 KBL All Star
