= Anthony Winchester =

American basketball player (born 1983)

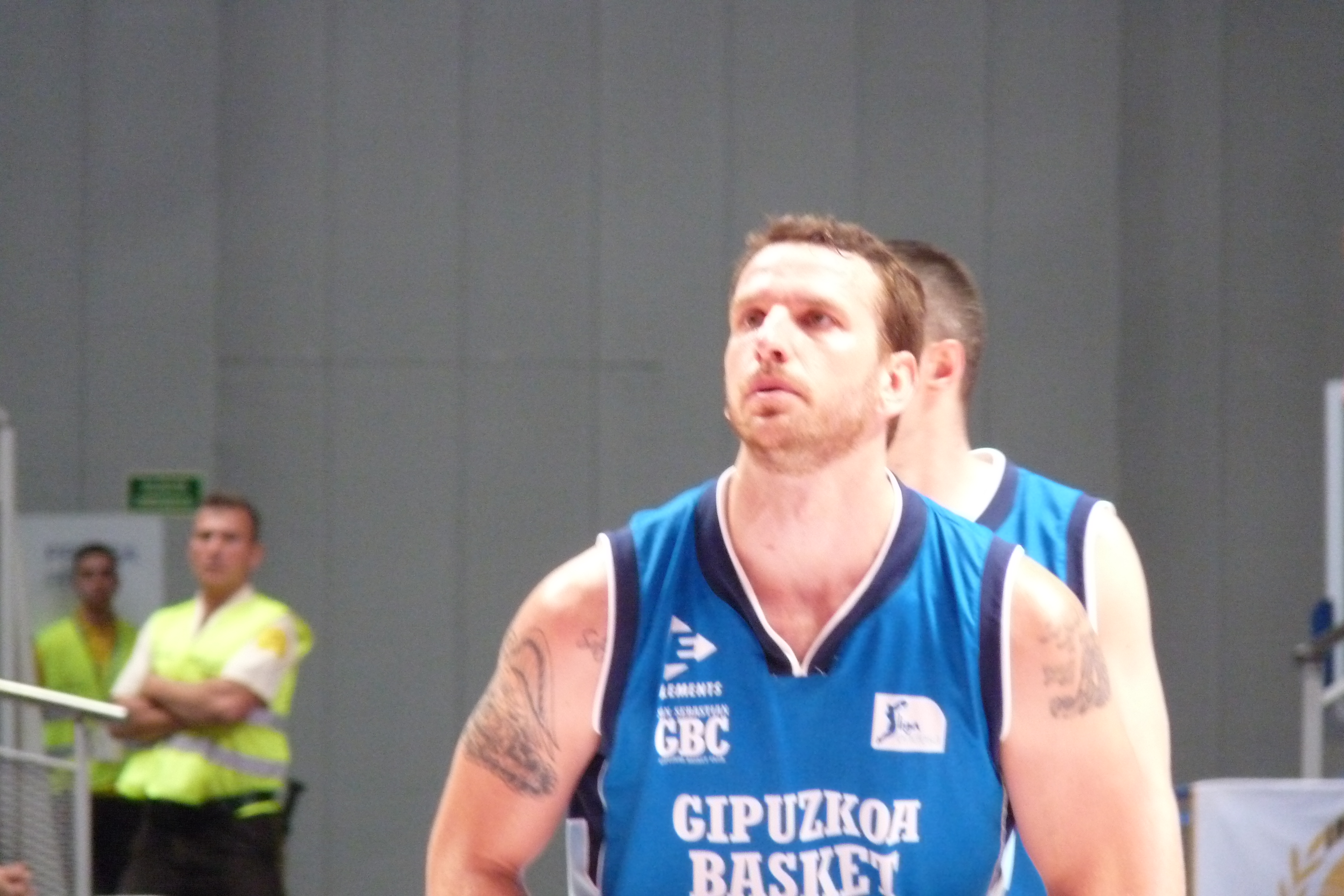
- Winchester in 2014

Kansas State Wildcats
- Title: Assistant coach
- League: Big 12 Conference

Personal information
- Born: May 15, 1983 (age 43) Seymour, Indiana, U.S.
- Listed height: 6 ft 4 in (1.93 m)
- Listed weight: 205 lb (93 kg)

Career information
- High school: Austin (Austin, Indiana)
- College: Western Kentucky (2002–2006)
- NBA draft: 2006: undrafted
- Playing career: 2006–2014
- Position: Shooting guard
- Coaching career: 2008–present

Career history

Playing
- 2006–2007: Club Melilla Baloncesto
- 2007: CB Atapuerca
- 2012–2013: CB Breogán
- 2013: Atléticos de San Germán
- 2013–2014: Gipuzkoa Basket

Coaching
- 2007–2008: Bowling Green HS (assistant)
- 2008–2010: Western Kentucky (director of operations)
- 2010–2011: Scottsburg HS
- 2018–2019: Loyola Marymount (graduate assistant)
- 2019–2020: Southern Miss (video coordinator)
- 2020–2021: Pacific (director of operations)
- 2021–2022: Southern Miss (assistant)
- 2022–present: Kansas State (Director of Video Operations)

Career highlights
- AP Honorable mention All-American (2006); Sun Belt Player of the Year (2006); 2× First-team All-Sun Belt (2005, 2006)

Anthony David Winchester (born May 15, 1983) is an American basketball coach and former professional basketball player. Winchester is currently an assistant coach at Kansas State. He played college basketball at Western Kentucky.

== High school career ==
Winchester attended Austin High School. He averaged 34.7 points per game as a senior and led Austin to the 2002 2A Final Four and Mid-Southern Conference Championship. Winchester was the runner-up for Indiana Mr. Basketball. He finished his career with 2,256 points.

== College career ==
Winchester played college basketball at Western Kentucky. In February 2004, he scored 40 points in a loss to Louisiana-Lafayette. He averaged 18.2 points and 7.2 rebounds per game as a junior, despite playing out of position at power forward due to injuries. As a senior, Winchester averaged 18.5 points, 5.3 rebounds, 2.5 assists and 1 steal per game. He was named Sun Belt Player of the Year and Honorable Mention All-American. Winchester concluded his college career with 1,732 points.

== Professional career ==
Winchester was selected by the Dodge City Legend with the fourth pick of the 2006 USBL draft. In August 2006, he signed with Club Melilla Baloncesto of the Spanish LEB Oro. Winchester led the team with 12.8 points per game and was twice named Player of the Month. He joined CB Atapuerca for the 2007–08 season but suffered a back injury in October 2007. He decided not to play professionally for five years, citing lack of motivation. In 2012, Winchester signed with CB Breogán. He averaged 15.3 points per game and was named Guard of the Year. Winchester joined Gipuzkoa Basket for the 2013–14 season and averaged 10.2 points per game.

== Coaching career ==
Winchester became an assistant coach at Bowling Green High School for the 2007–2008 season. In 2008, he joined Ken McDonald's staff at Western Kentucky as a graduate assistant. He was promoted to director of operations for the 2009–10 season. In July 2010, Winchester was hired as the head coach of Scottsburg Senior High School. In his only season, the Warriors finished 3–18.

Winchester served as a graduate assistant at Loyola Marymount during the 2018–19 season. In May 2019, he joined Southern Miss as a video coordinator. Winchester was inducted into Western Kentucky's Athletic Hall of Fame in October 2019. He joined Pacific as the director of operations for the 2020–21 season. In August 2021, Winchester was hired as an assistant coach at Southern Miss.
