= Rochester Renegade =

American basketball team

- Conference: American
- Division: Mideast (1992–94)
- League: CBA
- Established: 1992
- Folded: 1994
- Arena: Mayo Civic Center
- Capacity: 7,200
- Location: Rochester, Minnesota
- Team colors: 1992–93: white, green, navy 1993–94: white, red, black
- Ownership: Tom McMillan

The Rochester Renegade (later Rochester Renegades) were a professional basketball team based in Rochester, Minnesota. They played 2 seasons in the Continental Basketball Association (CBA), the defunct development league for the National Basketball Association (NBA).

== History ==
After the Birmingham Bandits of Birmingham, Alabama had recorded the worst attendance of the CBA in the 1991–92 season, on May 28, 1992 their owner Tom McMillan announced that the Kahler Corporation had acquired the franchise, and the team was relocated to Rochester, Minnesota, becoming the Rochester Renegade. The team was intentionally named Renegade and not Renegades, and played their games at the Mayo Civic Center, while the team had their headquarters at 100 First Ave. SW in Rochester. The Renegade were affiliated with two NBA teams: the Atlanta Hawks and the Utah Jazz. The CBA placed the team in the Mideast Division of the American Conference, together with the Rockford Lightning, the Quad City Thunder and the La Crosse Catbirds. In their first season under coach Ron Ekker the team finished with the worst record in CBA history with 6 wins and 50 losses. Forward Tony Farmer led the team in scoring with 22.5 points per game in 16 appearances, while Ronnie Grandison averaged a double-double with 19.9 points and 10.6 rebounds in 23 games played.

In July 1993 the team management named Bill Musselman head coach and vice-president of basketball operations. The name changed to Rochester Renegades and the team colors switched from white, green and blue to white, red and black. In the 1993–94 season the Renegades won 31 games, losing 25, and qualified for the playoffs. During the season Dell Demps was called up to the NBA by the Golden State Warriors, and two Renegades player won personal awards: Ronnie Grandison was named the CBA MVP, while Rodney Monroe was the Newcomer of the Year. The 1993–94 Renegades team used 41 different players, some of them only for 1 game; Monroe was the team leader in points per game with 20.2, while Grandison contributed with 16.5 points and 11.8 rebounds.

Despite the improved performance of the second season, the team still had one of the worst attendance records in the CBA with 2,200 tickets sold per game: owner Tom McMillan sold the team in May 1994, and the franchise relocated to Harrisburg, Pennsylvania, becoming the Harrisburg Hammerheads.

== Season-by-season records ==
Years	Wins	Losses	Winning percentage	Head coach(s)	Ref
1992–93	6	50	.107	Ron Ekker	
1992–93	31	25	.554	Bill Musselman	

== All-time roster ==
- George Ackles
- Ron Anderson
- Elmer Bennett
- Curtis Blair
- David Cain
- Rick Calloway
- Chris Collier
- Michael Cutright
- David Daniels
- Dell Demps
- Radenko Dobraš
- Patrick Eddie
- Jay Edwards
- Ron Ellis
- A. J. English
- Tony Farmer
- Steve Garrity
- Jay Goodman
- Orlando Graham
- Ronnie Grandison
- Jerome Harmon
- David Harris
- Kevin Holland
- Mike Hopkins
- Anthony Houston
- Alfredrick Hughes
- Mike Iuzzolino
- Dave Jamerson
- Adonis Jordan
- Stan Kimbrough
- Frank Kornet
- Kurk Lee
- Vada Martin
- Gary Massey
- Wes Matthews
- Travis Mays
- Ralph McPherson
- Cozell McQueen
- Scott Meents
- Jared Miller
- Dirk Minniefield
- Rodney Monroe
- Tod Murphy
- Dyron Nix
- Alan Ogg
- Leo Parent
- Bobby Parks
- Danny Pearson
- Elliot Perry
- Kenny Perry
- Mike Ratliff
- Eddie Rivera
- Melvin Robinson
- Elbert Rogers
- Bennie Seltzer
- Matt Steigenga
- Brook Steppe
- Jerry Stroman
- Lamont Strothers
- Brett Szabo
- Jay Taylor
- Stephen Thompson
- Gundars Vētra
- Bruce Wheatley
- Clinton Wheeler
- Nikita Wilson

== Awards ==
- CBA Most Valuable Player: Ronnie Grandison (1993–94)
- CBA Newcomer of the Year: Rodney Monroe (1993–94)
