= Josh Ajayi =

Nigerian basketball player (born 1996)

No. 9 – Anwil Włocławek
- Position: Small forward
- League: Polish Basketball League

Personal information
- Born: December 27, 1996 (age 29) Abuja, Nigeria
- Listed height: 6 ft 6 in (1.98 m)
- Listed weight: 229 lb (104 kg)

Career information
- High school: San Gabriel Academy (San Gabriel, California); Cheshire Academy (Cheshire, Connecticut)
- College: South Alabama (2016–2020)
- NBA draft: 2020: undrafted
- Playing career: 2020–present

Career history
- 2020–2021: Hermine Nantes
- 2021–2022: SLUC Nancy Basket
- 2022–2023: Saint-Chamond Basket
- 2023–2024: Balıkesir Belediyespor
- 2024: Skyliners Frankfurt
- 2024–2025: Basket Torino
- 2026–present: Anwil Włocławek

Career highlights
- First-team All-Sun Belt (2020); Second-team All-Sun Belt (2019)

Ifeoluwa Joshua Ajayi (born December 27, 1996) is a Nigerian professional basketball player for Anwil Włocławek of the Polish Basketball League. He played college basketball for South Alabama.

== Early life ==
Ajayi attended San Gabriel Academy where he averaged a double-double his final two seasons. He averaged 16.5 points and 11.8 rebounds per game as a junior. Ajayi did a postgraduate year at Cheshire Academy in Cheshire, Connecticut. He averaged 15 points and 10 rebounds per game and earned Class AA Honorable Mention All-New England honors from the New England Preparatory School Athletic Council. Ajayi signed with South Alabama out of high school.

== College career ==
Ajayi redshirted his true freshman season as a partial academic qualifier. He averaged 10.6 points and 5.4 rebounds per game as a redshirt freshman, and he scored 27 points against FIU. As a sophomore, Ajayi averaged 12.9 points and 6.7 rebounds per game. Ajayi averaged 16.4 points and 7.4 rebounds per game as a junior, shooting 56 percent from the floor. He earned Second Team All-Sun Belt honors. On November 12, 2019, Ajayi was named Sun Belt player of the week after posting a career-high 30 points as well as seven rebounds in a 75-69 victory over Southern Miss. He was again named conference player of the week on January 20, 2020, after posting 24 points in a 74-68 win over Georgia Southern. As a senior, Ajayi averaged 14.6 points and 7.2 rebounds per game, helping the Jaguars finish 20-11, and led the conference with a 56.2 field goal percentage. He was named to the First Team All-Sun Belt as well as First-Team All-District by the NABC.

== Professional career ==
On June 29, 2020, Ajayi signed his first professional contract with Hermine Nantes of the French LNB Pro B. He averaged 10.8 points, 4.4 rebounds, and 1.1 assists per game. On July 8, 2021, Ajayi signed with SLUC Nancy Basket.
