= 2025–26 South Alabama Jaguars men's basketball team =

American college basketball season

2025–26 South Alabama Jaguars men's basketball

NIT, First Round
- Conference: Sun Belt Conference
- Record: 21–12 (11–7 Sun Belt)
- Head coach: Richie Riley (8th season)
- Associate head coach: Rodney Crawford
- Assistant coaches: Orin Bailey, Jr.; Riley Conroy; Ogi Vasiljevic
- Home arena: Mitchell Center

2025–26 Sun Belt Conference men's basketball standings
	Conf.				Overall
Team	W		L	PCT	W		L	PCT
Troy †	12	–	6	.667	22	–	12	.647
Marshall	11	–	7	.611	19	–	13	.594
Coastal Carolina	11	–	7	.611	19	–	13	.594
Appalachian State	11	–	7	.611	19	–	13	.594
Texas State	11	–	7	.611	19	–	13	.594
South Alabama	11	–	7	.611	21	–	12	.636
Arkansas State	11	–	7	.611	20	–	12	.625
Southern Miss	9	–	9	.500	19	–	16	.543
James Madison	9	–	9	.500	18	–	15	.545
Georgia Southern	8	–	10	.444	21	–	16	.568
Old Dominion	7	–	11	.389	12	–	21	.364
Louisiana	7	–	11	.389	11	–	22	.333
Georgia State	7	–	11	.389	10	–	22	.313
Louisiana–Monroe	1	–	17	.056	4	–	28	.125
† 2026 Sun Belt tournament winner

The 2025–26 South Alabama Jaguars men's basketball team represented the University of South Alabama in the 2025–26 NCAA Division I men's basketball season. The Jaguars, led by eighth-year head coach Richie Riley, played their home games at the Mitchell Center in Mobile, Alabama as members in the Sun Belt Conference.

== Previous season ==
The Jaguars finished the 2024–25 season 21–11, 13–5 in Sun Belt play to finish in a four-way tie for first place. In the Sun Belt tournament, they lost in the semifinals to Arkansas State.

The Jaguars were briefly offered a bid to the 2025 National Invitation Tournament, but the offer was revoked when UC Riverside withdrew from the College Basketball Invitational to accept an NIT bid.

== Offseason ==
=== Departures ===
Name	Number	Pos.	Height	Weight	Year	Hometown	Reason for departure
Cantia Rahming	0	F	6'7"	205	GS Senior	Tampa, FL	Graduated; Signed to play with Medi Bayreuth
Dylan Fasoyiro	2	G	6'3"	195	GS Senior	Houston, TX	Graduated; Signed to play with BBC Coburg of ProB League
Elijah Ormiston	3	F	6'8"	220	Senior	Minneapolis, MN	Graduated; Signed to play with MBK Komárno
Julian Margrave	12	F	6'10"	210	Junior	Louisburg, KS	Transferred to Omaha
Myles Corey	20	G	6'0"	185	GS Senior	Ontario, CA	Transferred to Rhode Island
Ethan Kizer	21	F	6'5"	195	Sophomore	Metamora, IL	Transferred to South Dakota
Barry Dunning Jr.	22	G	6'6"	195	Junior	Mobile, AL	Transferred to Pittsburgh
Judah Brown	25	F	6'6"	225	GS Senior	Bermuda Dunes, CA	Graduated; Signed to play with SKN St. Pölten
Caleb Kizer	32	F	6'7"	230	Senior	Metamora, IL	Transferred to South Dakota

=== Incoming transfers ===
Name	Number	Pos.	Height	Weight	Year	Hometown	Previous School
Chaze Harris	2	G	6'6"	190	Senior	Cleveland, OH	Life
Hantz Louis-Jeune	4	G	6'5"	185	Graduate	Lake Worth, FL	Lenoir–Rhyne
Brian Hawthorne	7	G	6'2"	190	Junior	Shawnee, KS	Rockhurst
Peyton Law	9	F	6'7"	220	Senior	Calhoun, GA	Freed–Hardeman
Adam Olsen	12	F	6'8"	225	Junior	Surrey, BC	UBC

=== Recruiting classes ===
==== 2025 recruiting class ====
College recruiting
Name	Hometown	School	Height	Weight	Commit date
Samuel Shoptaw; PG	Windermere, FL	Windermere Prep	6 ft 2 in (1.88 m)	185 lb (84 kg)	Aug 27, 2024
Samuel Shoptaw; PG	Recruit ratings: No ratings found				
Desmond Williams; PG	Mobile, AL	Baker High School	6 ft 2 in (1.88 m)	160 lb (73 kg)	Jun 4, 2024
Desmond Williams; PG	Recruit ratings: No ratings found				
Stephen Williams; PF	Monroeville, AL	Coastal Alabama - North	6 ft 9 in (2.06 m)	220 lb (100 kg)	Mar 19, 2025
Stephen Williams; PF	Recruit ratings: No ratings found				
Overall recruit ranking:
Note: In many cases, Scout, Rivals, 247Sports, On3, and ESPN may conflict in their listings of height and weight.; In these cases, the average was taken. ESPN grades are on a 100-point scale.; Sources: "2025 Team Ranking". Rivals.

==== 2026 recruiting class ====
College recruiting (2026)
Name	Hometown	School	Height	Weight	Commit date
Lenni Kunzewitsch; SF	Germany, DEU	Ratiopharm Ulm	6 ft 9 in (2.06 m)	205 lb (93 kg)	May 2, 2026
Lenni Kunzewitsch; SF	Recruit ratings: No ratings found				
Diego Roman; PG	Switzerland, CHE	Switzerland	6 ft 6 in (1.98 m)	200 lb (91 kg)	Apr 8, 2026
Diego Roman; PG	Recruit ratings: No ratings found				
Overall recruit ranking:
Note: In many cases, Scout, Rivals, 247Sports, On3, and ESPN may conflict in their listings of height and weight.; In these cases, the average was taken. ESPN grades are on a 100-point scale.; Sources: "2026 Team Ranking". Rivals.

== Preseason ==
=== Preseason Sun Belt Conference poll ===
The Jaguars were picked to finish in third place in the conference's preseason poll. Redshirt sophomore guard John Broom was named to the conference preseason third team.

Coaches poll
Predicted finish	Team (1st place Votes)
1	James Madison - 175 (1)
2	Arkansas State - 154 (3)
3	South Alabama - 152 (4)
4	Troy - 148 (1)
5	Old Dominion - 145 (2)
6	Marshall - 128 (1)
7	App State - 123 (1)
8	Texas State - 106
9	Louisiana - 95 (1)
10	Georgia Southern - 66
11	Georgia State - 59
12	Southern Miss - 57
13	Coastal Carolina - 43
14	ULM - 19

== Roster ==
2025–26 South Alabama Jaguars men's basketball team
Players
Coaches

Pos.	#	Name	Height	Weight	Year	Previous school	Hometown
G	0	Samuel Shoptaw	6 ft 2 in (1.88 m)	205 lb (93 kg)	Fr	Windermere Prep	London, KY
G	1	Jayden Cooper	6 ft 2 in (1.88 m)	185 lb (84 kg)	Jr	Pike Road HS; Faulkner	Pike Road, AL
G	2	Chaze Harris	6 ft 6 in (1.98 m)	190 lb (86 kg)	Sr	Bedford HS; Life	Cleveland, OH
F	3	Stephen Williams	6 ft 9 in (2.06 m)	240 lb (109 kg)	So	Escambia County HS; Coastal Alabama CC	Atmore, AL
G	4	Hantz Louis-Jeune	6 ft 5 in (1.96 m)	185 lb (84 kg)	GS	Park Vista Community HS; Lenoir–Rhyne	Lake Worth, FL
G	6	JJ Wheat	6 ft 0 in (1.83 m)	180 lb (82 kg)	Sr	Clarksville HS; Freed–Hardeman	Clarksville, TN
G	7	Brian Hawthorne	6 ft 2 in (1.88 m)	190 lb (86 kg)	Jr	St. James Academy; Rockhurst	Shawnee, KS
G	8	Desmond Williams	6 ft 2 in (1.88 m)	185 lb (84 kg)	Fr	Baker HS	Mobile, AL
F	9	Peyton Law	6 ft 7 in (2.01 m)	220 lb (100 kg)	Sr	Calhoun HS; Freed–Hardeman	Calhoun, GA
G	10	Maxwell Land	6 ft 4 in (1.93 m)	200 lb (91 kg)	RS Sr	Archbishop Moeller HS; Saint Francis (PA)	Cincinnati, OH
F	12	Adam Olsen	6 ft 8 in (2.03 m)	225 lb (102 kg)	Jr	Elgin Park Secondary; UBC	Surrey, BC
G	14	John Broom	6 ft 5 in (1.96 m)	185 lb (84 kg)	RS So	Jacksonville HS	Jacksonville, AL
G/F	34	Randy Brady	6 ft 5 in (1.96 m)	215 lb (98 kg)	Sr	Hamilton Heights HS; Chattanooga	Chattanooga, TN

Head coach

- Richie Riley (Eastern Kentucky)

Assistant coach(es)

- Rodney Crawford (Cincinnati)
- Orin Bailey Jr. (Houston)
- Riley Conroy (Tulane)
- Ogi Vasiljevic (Ohio Valley)

Legend

- (C) Team captain
- (S) Suspended
- (I) Ineligible
- (W) Walk-on
- Injured
- Current redshirt

Roster

== Schedule and results ==
Date time, TV	Rank^{#}	Opponent^{#}	Result	Record	High points	High rebounds	High assists	Site (attendance) city, state
Exhibition
October 28, 2025*; 7:00 p.m.		West Florida	W 88–76		25 – Harris	11 – Law	5 – Wheat	Mitchell Center; Mobile, AL
Regular season
November 3, 2025*; 6:00 p.m., ESPN+		at Toledo; MAC–SBC Challenge	W 76–74	1–0	23 – Olsen	10 – Brady	7 – Harris	Savage Arena (3,626); Toledo, OH
November 6, 2025*; 7:00 p.m., ESPN+		Alcorn State	W 76–70	2–0	29 – Law	9 – Law	7 – Harris	Mitchell Center (1,654); Mobile, AL
November 8, 2025*; 3:00 p.m., ESPN+		Spring Hill	W 99–50	3–0	17 – Louis Jeune	15 – Williams	3 – Tied	Mitchell Center (1,450); Mobile, AL
November 13, 2025*; 10:00 a.m., YouTube		vs. Central Michigan; Showdown in St. Pete	W 66–64	4–0	21 – Olsen	9 – Harris	2 – Harris	McArthur Center (148); St. Petersburg, FL
November 15, 2025*; 10:00 a.m., YouTube		vs. Coppin State; Showdown in St. Pete	W 72–62	5–0	25 – Olsen	7 – Williams	6 – Harris	McArthur Center (243); St. Petersburg, FL
November 19, 2025*; 6:00 p.m., ESPN+		at Jacksonville State	W 71–65	6–0	19 – Harris	8 – Brady	3 – Harris	Pete Mathews Coliseum (2,366); Jacksonville, AL
November 21, 2025*; 6:30 p.m., ESPN+		at UAB	L 72–80	6–1	25 – Harris	8 – Brady	4 – Tied	Bartow Arena (3,531); Birmingham, AL
November 30, 2025*; 1:00 p.m., ESPN+		at UTSA	W 82–58	7–1	20 – Olsen	8 – Tied	9 – Harris	Convocation Center (960); San Antonio, TX
December 2, 2025*; 6:00 p.m.		vs. New Mexico State	W 77–75	8–1	21 – Olsen	7 – Brady	4 – Tied	Leonard E. Merrell Center (195); Katy, TX
December 5, 2025*; 6:00 p.m., ESPN+		at East Tennessee State	L 65–91	8–2	19 – Cooper	6 – Brady	7 – Harris	Freedom Hall Civic Center (2,473); Johnson City, TN
December 14, 2025*; 4:30 p.m., ESPN+		North Texas	L 57−58	8−3	20 – Harris	7 – Harris	3 – Tied	Mitchell Center (1,804); Mobile, AL
December 17, 2025; 6:30 p.m., ESPN+		at Louisiana–Monroe	W 96−92 ^{2OT}	9−3 (1−0)	38 – Harris	12 – Brady	8 – Harris	Fant–Ewing Coliseum (1,215); Monroe, LA
December 20, 2025; 2:30 p.m., ESPN+		at Texas State	L 65−67	9−4 (1−1)	22 – Harris	6 – Tied	1 – Tied	Strahan Arena (1,224); San Marcos, TX
December 29, 2025*; 7:00 p.m., ESPN+		Mobile	W 85–52	10–4	18 – Louis Jeune	9 – Brady	4 – Brady	Mitchell Center; Mobile, AL
December 31, 2025; 12:00 p.m., ESPN+		at Louisiana	W 63–58	11–4 (2–1)	26 – Olsen	8 – Brady	4 – Harris	Cajundome (2,337); Lafayette, LA
January 3, 2026; 3:30 p.m., ESPN+		at Troy	L 49–59	11–5 (2–2)	18 – Harris	13 – Williams	2 – Hawthorne	Trojan Arena (3,639); Troy, AL
January 10, 2026; 1:00 p.m., ESPNU		Georgia Southern	W 87–71	12–5 (3–2)	22 – Olsen	9 – Williams	8 – Harris	Mitchell Center (2,509); Mobile, AL
January 15, 2026; 7:00 p.m., ESPN+		Arkansas State	W 91–87 ^{OT}	13–5 (4–2)	38 – Harris	9 – Brady	5 – Harris	Mitchell Center (2,480); Mobile, AL
January 17, 2026; 3:00 p.m., ESPN+		Louisiana	L 56–59	13–6 (4–3)	18 – Harris	9 – Olsen	3 – Harris	Mitchell Center (2,617); Mobile, AL
January 22, 2026; 6:00 p.m., ESPN+		at James Madison	W 90–83	14–6 (5–3)	26 – Olsen	9 – Tied	3 – Tied	Atlantic Union Bank Center (3,046); Harrisonburg, VA
January 29, 2026; 7:00 p.m., ESPN+		Coastal Carolina	W 53–48	15–6 (6–3)	16 – Olsen	8 – Tied	4 – Tied	Mitchell Center (2,016); Mobile, AL
January 31, 2026; 7:00 p.m., ESPN+		Georgia State	W 69–67	16–6 (7–3)	15 – Harris	11 – Olsen	6 – Harris	Mitchell Center (2,125); Mobile, AL
February 4, 2026; 5:30 p.m., ESPN+		at Appalachian State	L 57–65	16–7 (7–4)	17 – Harris	5 – Cooper	6 – Harris	Holmes Convocation Center (2,014); Boone, NC
February 7, 2026*; 3:00 p.m., ESPN+		Buffalo; MAC–SBC Challenge	W 81–69	17–7	23 – Olsen	7 – Broom	4 – Tied	Mitchell Center; Mobile, AL
February 12, 2026; 7:30 p.m., ESPN+		at Southern Miss	W 84–78	18–7 (8–4)	34 – Cooper	6 – Brady	4 – Harris	Reed Green Coliseum (2,846); Hattiesburg, MS
February 14, 2026; 2:00 p.m., ESPN+		at Arkansas State	W 92–88 ^{OT}	19–7 (9–4)	30 – Harris	9 – Brady	5 – Tied	First National Bank Arena (3,823); Jonesboro, AR
February 16, 2026; 6:00 p.m., ESPN+		at Marshall	L 80–84	19–8 (9–5)	28 – Harris	11 – Williams	8 – Harris	Cam Henderson Center (3,932); Huntington, WV
February 19, 2026; 7:00 p.m., ESPN+		Texas State	L 82–90 ^{OT}	19–9 (9–6)	28 – Harris	6 – Brady	8 – Harris	Mitchell Center; Mobile, AL
February 21, 2026; 3:00 p.m., ESPN+		Troy	W 65–54	20–9 (10–6)	17 – Tied	7 – Olsen	5 – Harris	Mitchell Center (5,250); Mobile, AL
February 25, 2026; 7:30 p.m., ESPN+		Louisiana–Monroe	W 89–54	21–9 (11–6)	29 – Olsen	8 – Brady	5 – Harris	Mitchell Center (1,991); Mobile, AL
February 27, 2026; 7:30 p.m., ESPN+		Southern Miss	L 55–68	21–10 (11–7)	23 – Harris	9 – Harris	2 – Brady	Mitchell Center (3,678); Mobile, AL
Sun Belt tournament
March 6, 2026; 7:30 p.m., ESPN+	(6)	vs. (10) Georgia Southern; Fourth round	L 85–94	21–11	17 – Harris	7 – Williams	10 – Harris	Pensacola Bay Center (1,867); Pensacola, FL
NIT
March 17, 2026; 9:00 p.m., ESPN2		at (1 AU) Auburn; First round	L 67–78	21–12	29 – Harris	9 – Williams	6 – Harris	Neville Arena (2,169); Auburn, AL
*Non-conference game. ^{#}Rankings from AP Poll. (#) Tournament seedings in parentheses. AU=Auburn. All times are in Central Time.
