= Terry Catledge =

American basketball player (born 1963)

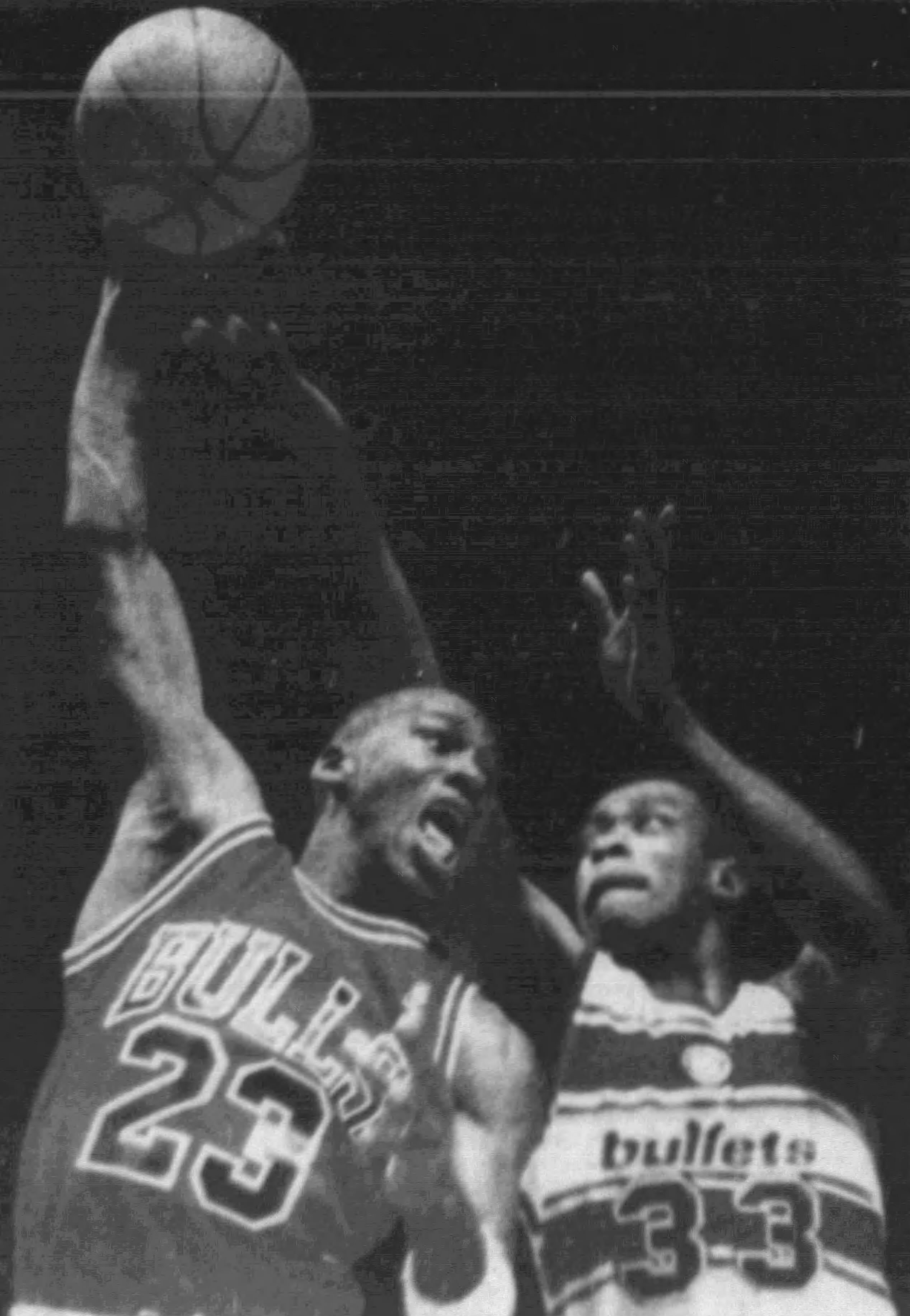
- Catledge against Michael Jordan in 1986

Personal information
- Born: August 22, 1963 (age 63) Houston, Mississippi, U.S.
- Listed height: 6 ft 8 in (2.03 m)
- Listed weight: 220 lb (100 kg)

Career information
- High school: Houston (Houston, Mississippi)
- College: South Alabama (1982–1985)
- NBA draft: 1985: 1st round, 21st overall pick
- Drafted by: Philadelphia 76ers
- Playing career: 1985–1996
- Position: Power forward
- Number: 23, 33

Career history
- 1985–1986: Philadelphia 76ers
- 1986–1989: Washington Bullets
- 1989–1993: Orlando Magic
- 1993: Pau-Orthez
- 1993: Oklahoma City Cavalry
- 1994: Mississippi Coast Gamblers
- 1994: Aris
- 1994–1995: Shreveport Crawdads
- 1996: Shreveport Storm
- 1996: Atenas de Córdoba

Career highlights
- 2× Sun Belt Player of the Year (1984, 1985); 3× First-team All-Sun Belt (1983–1985); No. 23 retired by South Alabama Jaguars

Career NBA statistics
- Points: 6,520 (12.7 ppg)
- Rebounds: 3,314 (6.4 rpg)
- Stats at NBA.com
- Stats at Basketball Reference

Terry DeWayne Catledge (born August 22, 1963) is an American former professional basketball player who was a forward in the National Basketball Association (NBA). He played college basketball for the South Alabama Jaguars. Catledge was selected by the Philadelphia 76ers in the first round of the 1985 NBA draft with the 21st overall pick. He spent eight seasons (1985–1993) in the NBA as a member of the 76ers, Washington Bullets, and Orlando Magic.

== High school ==
Catledge attended Houston High School in Houston, Mississippi where he played basketball and averaged 31 points, 15 rebounds and four blocked shots during his career.

== College career ==
Catledge initially enrolled at the University of South Alabama in April 1981. By August, he was back in Houston due to homesickness and enrolled at Itawamba Junior College in nearby Fulton, Mississippi. He returned to South Alabama in September but the NCAA considered him a transfer and he lost a year of eligibility. In three seasons at South Alabama, he averaged 21.7 points and 10.8 rebounds per game and was a two-time Sun Belt Player Conference of the Year and three-time First-team All-Sun Belt. His number was retired by the Jaguars in 1985 and in 1999, he was inducted into the South Alabama Athletic Hall of Fame.

== Professional career ==
=== NBA ===
Following his college career, Catledge was drafted by the Philadelphia 76ers in the first round of the 1985 NBA draft. Backing up Charles Barkley, he averaged 7.7 points and 4.3 rebounds during his rookie season. His playing time increased in the playoffs, due to an injury to Moses Malone, and he went on to average 10.4 points and 6.8 rebounds, including a 27-point outburst in the deciding game five of the 76ers first round clash against the Washington Bullets. In June 1986, he was traded along with Moses Malone and a draft pick to the Washington Bullets for Jeff Ruland and Cliff Robinson.

He spent three seasons with the Bullets, averaging 11.4 points and 6.7 rebounds, before being selected by the Orlando Magic with the fifth pick in the 1989 NBA expansion draft.

During the 1989-1990 season, he led the Magic with an NBA career high of 19.4 points per game. After four seasons with the Magic, Catledge negotiated a buyout of his remaining three years of his contract following training camp in October 1993 due to decreasing playing time and the Magic's move to younger players. Shaquille O'Neal has said that Catledge refused to give him #33, hence why he wore #32 while playing in Orlando.

=== Later career ===
Following his departure from the Magic, he signed with Pau-Orthez in France in October. He appeared in two league games for the team, averaging 20.0 points and 6.0 rebounds, before returning to the United States in November of the same year. He later joined Oklahoma City Cavalry in the Continental Basketball Association. In December 1993, the Cavalry traded him to the Fargo-Moorhead Fever for Barry Sumpter. He never played for the Fever, instead joined the Mississippi Coast Gamblers of the United States Basketball League. In his debut for the Gamblers, Catledge scored 44 points. For the season, he averaged 33 points per game.

Catledge started the 1994–1995 season with Aris in Greece but had left the team after a short stint. In November he agreed to sign with CBA's Shreveport Crawdads but difficulties in getting his official release from Aris pushed his debut with the Crawdads until 3 January 1995. He would go on appearing in 10 games for the Crawdads, averaging 20.7 and 8.9 rebounds per game. He left the club in February 1995 with the intention of signing in Spain though the contract later fell through. In September the same year, he was invited by the Bullets to a free agent mini camp but ended not getting signed.

In January 1996, he returned to Shreveport, now called Storm. After his first game for the Storm, where he scored 6 points, Catledge requested to be put on the inactive list ahead of the teams next game, siding lack of conditioning and leg pain. He would not suit up for the team again.

Later in 1996, Catledge joined Atenas de Córdoba of the Argentine Liga Nacional de Básquetbol. He appeared in five games for Córdoba, averaging 17 points and 6 rebounds.

== Career statistics ==
Legend
GP	Games played	GS	Games started	MPG	Minutes per game
FG%	Field goal percentage	3P%	3-point field goal percentage	FT%	Free throw percentage
RPG	Rebounds per game	APG	Assists per game	SPG	Steals per game
BPG	Blocks per game	PPG	Points per game	**Bold**	Career high

=== NBA ===
==== Regular season ====
Year	Team	GP	GS	MPG	FG%	3P%	FT%	RPG	APG	SPG	BPG	PPG
1985–86	Philadelphia	64	7	17.1	.469	.000	.647	4.3	.3	.5	.1	7.7
1986–87	Washington	78	**77**	27.6	.495	.000	.594	7.2	.7	.6	.2	13.1
1987–88	Washington	70	40	23.0	**.506**	.000	.655	5.7	.9	.5	.1	10.7
1988–89	Washington	**79**	**77**	26.3	.490	.200	.602	7.2	.9	.6	**.3**	10.4
1989–90	Orlando	74	72	**33.3**	.474	**.250**	.702	**7.6**	1.0	.5	.2	**19.4**
1990–91	Orlando	51	38	28.6	.462	.000	.624	7.0	1.1	**.7**	.2	14.6
1991–92	Orlando	78	67	31.2	.496	.000	.694	7.0	**1.4**	**.7**	.2	14.8
1992–93	Orlando	21	1	12.5	.493	–	**.794**	2.2	.2	.2	.0	4.7
Career		515	379	26.3	.485	.094	.654	6.4	.9	.6	.2	12.7

==== Playoffs ====
Year	Team	GP	GS	MPG	FG%	3P%	FT%	RPG	APG	SPG	BPG	PPG
1986	Philadelphia	**11**	**10**	26.6	.393	–	.579	6.8	**.5**	.5	**.7**	10.4
1987	Washington	3	3	**32.7**	**.561**	–	.529	**8.3**	.0	**1.0**	.3	**18.3**
1988	Washington	5	0	9.0	.364	.000	**.750**	1.2	.4	.0	.0	2.2
Career		19	13	22.9	.432	.000	.576	5.6	.4	.5	.5	9.5
