= Junie Lewis =

American basketball player (born 1966)

Personal information
- Born: January 11, 1966 (age 60) Abington, Pennsylvania, U.S.
- Listed height: 6 ft 3 in (1.91 m)
- Listed weight: 180 lb (82 kg)

Career information
- High school: Abington (Abington, Pennsylvania)
- College: Pittsburgh (1984–1985); South Alabama (1986–1989)
- NBA draft: 1989: 2nd round, 48th overall pick
- Drafted by: Utah Jazz
- Position: Guard

Career history
- 1991–1992: Oklahoma City Cavalry

Career highlights
- No. 11 retired by South Alabama Jaguars
- Stats at Basketball Reference

Eugene Junie Lewis (born January 11, 1966) is a retired American basketball player. He was drafted by the Utah Jazz in the second round of the 1989 NBA draft out of the University of South Alabama.

== College career ==
During the 1988–89 season, Lewis averaged 17.7 points, 6.7 rebounds, and 5.9 assists.

During their playing days at South Alabama, Lewis and fellow guard Jeff Hodge were usually referred to as "peanut butter and jelly", respectively. Lewis's number (11) was retired alongside Hodge's in a ceremony on January 20, 2018.
