= Chaze Harris =

American basketball player (born 2003)

Charlotte 49ers
- Position: Small forward
- League: American Conference

Personal information
- Listed height: 6 ft 6 in (1.98 m)
- Listed weight: 200 lb (91 kg)

Career information
- High school: Bedford (Bedford, Ohio)
- College: Lakeland CC (2021–2022); Shawnee State (2023–2024); Life (2024–2025); South Alabama (2025–2026); Charlotte (2026–present)

Career highlights
- NAIA First-team All-American (2025); SSAC Player of the Year (2025); Sun Belt Player of the Year (2026); First-team All-Sun Belt (2026); First-team All-River States (2024)

Chaze Harris is an American college basketball player for the Charlotte 49ers of the American Conference. He previously played for the South Alabama Jaguars, Life Running Eagles, and Shawnee State Bears.

== High school career ==
Harris attended Bedford High School in Bedford, Ohio. As a senior, he was named First Team All-Division I.

== College career ==
Harris began his collegiate career at Lakeland Community College. For his sophomore season, he transferred to Shawnee State. For his junior season, Harris transferred to Life University. He averaged 19.7 points, 6.9 assists, 6.6 rebounds, and 2.1 steals per game and was named NAIA First-Team All-American. Harris transferred to South Alabama for his senior year. As a senior, Harris averaged 19.2 points, 4.8 rebounds and 4.9 assists per game. He was named Sun Belt Player of the Year. Following the season, Harris transferred to Charlotte.
