= Jeff Hodge =

American basketball player (born 1966)

Personal information
- Born: November 18, 1966 (age 59) Birmingham, Alabama, U.S.
- Listed height: 6 ft 3 in (1.91 m)
- Listed weight: 175 lb (79 kg)

Career information
- High school: Woodlawn (Birmingham, Alabama)
- College: South Alabama (1985–1989)
- NBA draft: 1989: 2nd round, 53rd overall pick
- Drafted by: Dallas Mavericks
- Position: Guard

Career history
- 1989–1990: Wichita Falls Texans
- 1991–1992: Oklahoma City Cavalry

Career highlights
- Sun Belt Player of the Year (1989); 3× First-team All-Sun Belt (1987–1989); No. 5 retired by South Alabama Jaguars
- Stats at Basketball Reference

Jeffery Allen Hodge (born November 18, 1966) is an American retired professional basketball player. He was a second round pick in the 1989 NBA draft out of the University of South Alabama.

== High school ==
Hodge played basketball at Woodlawn High School. He won multiple awards:

- 6A Player of the Year
- Super 5
- Was one of many players from his high school to play in All State or All Tournament.

== College career ==
Hodge was well known for his 3-pointer against the state rivals, University of Alabama. He sank the needed 3-pointer with two seconds left in regulation; it was needed to win the game and advance. This happened in the first round of the National Collegiate Athletic Association Southeast Regional Tournament. In the next game South Alabama would play the eventual NCAA Division I champion University of Michigan, but would lose 91–82.

During their playing days at South Alabama, fellow guard Junie Lewis and Hodge were usually referred to as "peanut butter and jelly", respectively. Hodge's jersey (5) was retired alongside Lewis's in a ceremony on January 20, 2018.

== Professional career ==
Following the close of his college career, Hodge was drafted in the second round of the 1989 NBA draft (53rd pick overall) by the Dallas Mavericks. He never played in the NBA, but did play in the Continental Basketball Association (CBA) for the Wichita Falls Texans and Oklahoma City Cavalry. He averaged 17 points per game for his 64-game CBA career.
