= 2025–26 Sun Belt Conference men's basketball season =

Basketball sports season

- League: NCAA Division I
- Sport: Basketball
- Duration: November 3, 2025 – February 27, 2026
- Teams: 14
- TV partner: ESPN

2025–26 NCAA Division I men's basketball season
- Regular season champions: Troy
- Season MVP: Chaze Harris, South Alabama

Tournament
- Champions: Troy
- Runners-up: Georgia Southern
- Finals MVP: Thomas Dowd, Troy

Basketball seasons
- ← 2024–25 2026–27 →

2025–26 Sun Belt Conference men's basketball standings
	Conf.				Overall
Team	W		L	PCT	W		L	PCT
Troy †	12	–	6	.667	22	–	12	.647
Marshall	11	–	7	.611	19	–	13	.594
Coastal Carolina	11	–	7	.611	19	–	13	.594
Appalachian State	11	–	7	.611	19	–	13	.594
Texas State	11	–	7	.611	19	–	13	.594
South Alabama	11	–	7	.611	21	–	12	.636
Arkansas State	11	–	7	.611	20	–	12	.625
Southern Miss	9	–	9	.500	19	–	16	.543
James Madison	9	–	9	.500	18	–	15	.545
Georgia Southern	8	–	10	.444	21	–	16	.568
Old Dominion	7	–	11	.389	12	–	21	.364
Louisiana	7	–	11	.389	11	–	22	.333
Georgia State	7	–	11	.389	10	–	22	.313
Louisiana–Monroe	1	–	17	.056	4	–	28	.125
† 2026 Sun Belt tournament winner

The 2025–26 Sun Belt Conference men's basketball season is the upcoming season for Sun Belt Conference men's basketball teams that will began with practices in October 2025, followed by the start of the 2025–26 NCAA Division I men's basketball season in November. Conference play will begin in December 2025, and conclude on February 27, 2026. The 2026 Sun Belt Conference men's basketball tournament will take place from March 3–9, 2026, at the Pensacola Bay Center in Pensacola, Florida.

== Head coaches ==
=== Coaching Changes ===
==== Arkansas State ====
On March 24, 2025, head coach Bryan Hodgson left to become head coach of South Florida. On March 30, 2025, former Alabama assistant coach, Ryan Pannone was named head coach.

==== Louisiana ====
Houston associate head coach, Quannas White was named head coach of the Ragin' Cajuns on March 10, 2025. This comes after 15-year head coach, Bob Marlin was fired on December 19, 2024.

==== Louisiana–Monroe ====
Keith Richard retired at the end of the 2024–25 basketball season after fifteen seasons. Assistant head coach, Phil Cuningham was named his successor

=== Coaches ===
Team	Head coach	Previous job	Years at school	Overall record	Sun Belt record	Sun Belt titles	Sun Belt Tournament titles	NCAA Tournaments
Appalachian State	Dustin Kerns	Presbyterian	7	133–91 (.594)	76–49 (.608)	1	1	1
Arkansas State	Ryan Pannone	Alabama (Asst.)	1	20–11 (.645)	11–7 (.611)	0	0	0
Coastal Carolina	Justin Gray	Western Carolina	2	29–34 (.460)	14–22 (.389)	0	0	0
Georgia Southern	Charlie Henry	Alabama (Asst.)	3	26–41 (.388)	6–20 (.231)	0	0	0
Georgia State	Jonas Hayes	Xavier (Assoc.)	3	38–58 (.396)	19–35 (.352)	0	0	0
James Madison	Preston Spradlin	Morehead State	2	20–13 (.606)	13–5 (.722)	1	0	0
Louisiana	Quannas White	Houston (Assoc.)	1	0–1 (.000)	0–0 (–)	1	1	1
Louisiana–Monroe	Phil Cunningham	Louisiana-Monroe (Asst.)	1	0–1 (.000)	0–0 (–)	0	0	0
Marshall	Cornelius Jackson	Marshall (Assoc.)	2	21–13 (.618)	12–6 (.667)	0	0	0
Old Dominion	Mike Jones	Maryland (Asst.)	2	15–21 (.417)	.444	0	0	0
South Alabama	Richie Riley	Nicholls State	8	132–94 (.584)	70–55 (.560)	1	0	0
Southern Miss	Jay Ladner	Southeastern Louisiana	7	76–112 (.404)	38–69 (.355)	0	0	0
Texas State	Terrence Johnson	Texas State (Asst.)	6	86–69 (.555)	46–38 (.548)	2	0	0
Troy	Scott Cross	TCU (Asst.)	7	104–87 (.545)	56–50 (.528)	2	2	2

== Preseason ==
=== Preseason Coaches Poll ===
On October 20, 2025, the conference announced a preseason conference poll as voted by the league's 14 head coaches.

Rank	Team
1.	James Madison (1)
2.	Arkansas State (3)
3.	South Alabama (4)
4.	Troy (1)
5.	Old Dominion (2)
6.	Marshall (1)
7.	App State (1)
8.	Texas State
9.	Louisiana (1)
10.	Georgia Southern
11.	Georgia State
12.	Southern Miss
13.	Coastal Carolina
14.	Louisiana–Monroe

==== Sun Belt preseason player of the year ====
- Robert Davis Jr. –Old Dominion

==== Preseason All-Sun Belt team ====
2025-26 Sun Belt Men's Basketball Preseason All-Conference Teams
First Team	Second Team	Third Team
Robert Davis Jr. – Old Dominion; Bradley Douglas – James Madison; Thomas Dowd - Troy; Tyren Moore – Georgia Southern; Jalen Speer – Marshall	Eren Banks – Appalachian State; Mark Drone – Texas State; Jelani Hamilton – Georgia State; Chandler Jackson – Arkansas State; RaSheed Jones – Coastal Carolina	Jordan Battle – Old Dominion; John Broom – South Alabama; Kaden Grumbs – TexasState; Matt Van Komen – Marshall; Nakavieon White – Georgia Southern

== Regular season ==
=== Early season tournaments ===
Team	Tournament	Finish
Arkansas State	Arkansas State Multi Team Event	1st
Coastal Carolina	Western Illinois MTE	1st
Georgia State	Cancún Challenge	–
James Madison	FIU MTE	1st
Louisiana–Monroe	ETSU MTE	3rd
South Alabama	Showdown in St. Pete	1st
Texas State	Resort World Las Vegas Classic	4th
Troy	Coconut Hoops	3rd

=== Conference matrix ===
	APP	ASU	CCU	GSO	GST	JMU	UL	ULM	MAR	ODU	USA	USM	TXS	TROY
vs. Appalachian State	—	0–0	67–49; 62–67	0–0	63–70; 52–50	80–65	0–0	0–0	81–88	81–73; 73–75	65–57	0–0	0–0	0–0
vs. Arkansas State	0–0	—	0–0	0–0	0–0	74–78	0–0	0–0	0–0	0–0	0–0	93–86	89–70	86–74
vs. Coastal Carolina	49–67; 67–62	0–0	—	81–82	0–0	0–0	0–0	0–0	0–0	76–74; 66–70	0–0	0–0	0–0	0–0
vs. Georgia Southern	0–0	0–0	82–81	—	90−67	0–0	0–0	0–0	0–0	93–86	0–0	0–0	0–0	0–0
vs. Georgia State	70–63; 50–52	0–0	0–0	67–90	—	96–92	0–0	0–0	80–84	0–0	0–0	0–0	0–0	0–0
vs. James Madison	65–80	0–0	0–0	0–0	92–96	—	64–66	0–0	0–0	68–74; 70–69	0–0	0–0	0–0	0–0
vs. Louisiana	0–0	0–0	0–0	0–0	0–0	0–0	—	76–62	0–0	0–0	58–63	54–62; 74–67	0–0	0–0
vs. Louisiana–Monroe	0–0	0–0	0–0	0–0	0–0	0–0	62–76	—	0–0	0–0	92–96	0–0	0–0	0–0
vs. Marshall	88–81	0–0	0–0	0–0	84–80	66–64	0–0	0–0	—	0–0	0–0	0–0	0–0	63–70
vs. Old Dominion	73–81; 75–73	0–0	74–76; 70–66	86–93	0–0	74–68; 69–70	0–0	0–0	0–0	—	0–0	0–0	0–0	0–0
vs. South Alabama	57–65	0–0	0–0	0–0	0–0	0–0	63–58	96–92	0–0	0–0	—	0–0	65−67	49–59
vs. Southern Miss	0–0	86–93	0–0	0–0	0–0	0–0	62–54; 74–67	0–0	0–0	0–0	0–0	—	0–0	0–0
vs. Texas State	0–0	70–89	0–0	0–0	0–0	0–0	0–0	0–0	0–0	0–0	67–65	0–0	—	0–0
vs. Troy	0–0	0–0	0–0	0–0	0–0	0–0	0–0	0–0	70–63	0–0	59–49	0–0	0–0	—
Total	0–0	0–0	0–0	0–0	0–0	0–0	0–0	0–0	0–0	0–0	0–0	0–0	0–0	0–0

=== Player of the week ===
Week	Player(s) of the Week	School
Nov 10	Cooper Campbell	Troy
Nov 17	Spudd Webb	Georgia Southern
Nov 24	Tylik Weeks	Southern Miss
Dec 1	Justin McBride	James Madison
Dec 8	Spudd Webb (2)	Georgia Southern
Dec 16	Alonzo Dodd	Appalachian State
Dec 23	Chaze Harris	South Alabama
Dec 30	A.J. Dancler	Coastal Carolina
Jan 5	Jalen Speer	Marshall
Jan 12	Adam Olsen	South Alabama
Jan 19	Victor Valdes	Troy
Jan 27	Jelani Hamilton	Georgia State
Feb 2	Kasen Jennings	Appalachian State
Feb 9	Djahi Binet	Southern Miss
Feb 16	Chaze Harris (2)	South Alabama
Feb 23	Cliff Davis	James Madison
Mar 2	A.J. Dancler (2)	Coastal Carolina

=== Records against other conferences ===
Power 6 Conferences
Conference	Record
ACC	0–5
Big East	0–1
Big Ten	0–2
Big 12	0–2
Pac–12	0–0
SEC	0–2
Combined	0–12
Other NCAA Division I Conferences	Record
America East	0–0
American	3–5
ASUN	1–3
Atlantic 10	0–2
Big Sky	0–0
Big South	5–4
Big West	0–2
CAA	2–5
Conference USA	7–2
Horizon	0–1
Independents/Non-Division I	0–0
Ivy	1–0
MAAC	0–0
MAC	4–11
MEAC	5–1
Missouri Valley	0–1
Mountain West	1–0
Northeast	2–0
OVC	4–1
Patriot	0–1
Southern	1–2
Southland	4–3
SWAC	6–1
Summit	2–1
West Coast	0–3
WAC	2–0
Combined	49–51

== Postseason ==
=== Sun Belt tournament ===
First round Tuesday, March 3 ESPN+
12	Louisiana	84
13	Georgia State	75
11	Old Dominion	87
14	Louisiana-Monroe	80

Second round Wednesday, March 4 ESPN+
9	James Madison	87
12	Louisiana	72
10	Georgia Southern	88
11	Old Dominion	84

Third round Thursday, March 5 ESPN+
8	Southern Miss	86
9	James Madison	80
7	Arkansas State	77
10	Georgia State	80

Fourth round Friday, March 6 ESPN+
5	Texas State	77
8	Southern Miss	81
6	South Alabama	85
10	Georgia State	94

Quarterfinals; Saturday, March 7 ESPN+
4	Appalachian State	73
8	Southern Miss	86
3	Coastal Carolina
10	Georgia State

Semifinals; Sunday, March 8 ESPN+
1	Troy
2	Marshall

Championship; Monday, March 9 ESPN 2

* – Denotes overtime period

- The tournament will be held at the Pensacola Bay Center in Pensacola, Florida, from March 3–9, 2026.

=== NCAA tournament ===
Seed	Region	School	First Four	First round
13	South	Troy	Bye	L 47–76 vs. (4) Nebraska
		W–L (%):	0–0 (–)	0–1 (.000) Total: 0–1 (.000)

=== National Invitation Tournament ===
Seed	Bracket	School	1st round
	Auburn	South Alabama	L 67–78 at (1) Auburn
		W–L (%):	0–1 (.000) Total: 0–1 (.000)

== Honors and awards ==
=== Sun Belt Awards ===
2024-25 Sun Belt Men's Basketball Individual Awards
Award	Recipient(s)
Player of the Year	Chaze Harris – South Alabama
Coach of the Year	Scott Cross – Troy
Defensive Player of the Year	Luke Wilson – Appalachian State
Newcomer of the Year	Joshua Beadle – Coastal Carolina
Freshman of the Year	D.J. Hall – Texas State
Sixth Man Award	Joey Chammaa – Arkansas State

2025-26 Sun Belt Men's Basketball All-Conference Teams
First Team	Second Team	Third Team
Joshua Beadle – Coastal Carolina; Thomas Dowd – Troy; Wyatt Fricks – Marshall; Chaze Harris – South Alabama; Tylik Weeks – Southern Miss	D.J. Hall – Texas State; Jelani Hamilton – Georgia Southern; Kasen Jennings – Appalachian State; Adam Olsen – South Alabama; Jalen Speer – Marshall	Cliff Davis – James Madison; Alonzo Dodd – Appalachian State; Christian Harmon – Arkansas State; Justin McBride – James Madison; Victor Valdes – Troy
