= 2025–26 Troy Trojans men's basketball team =

American college basketball season

2025–26 Troy Trojans men's basketball

Sun Belt regular season and tournament champions

NCAA tournament, First round
- Conference: Sun Belt Conference
- Record: 22–12 (12–6 Sun Belt)
- Head coach: Scott Cross (7th season)
- Associate head coach: Kaleb Canales (1st season)
- Assistant coaches: Scott Campbell; Larry Cordaro; Brandon Gilbert; Kelvin Lewis
- Home arena: Trojan Arena

2025–26 Sun Belt Conference men's basketball standings
	Conf.				Overall
Team	W		L	PCT	W		L	PCT
Troy †	12	–	6	.667	22	–	12	.647
Marshall	11	–	7	.611	19	–	13	.594
Coastal Carolina	11	–	7	.611	19	–	13	.594
Appalachian State	11	–	7	.611	19	–	13	.594
Texas State	11	–	7	.611	19	–	13	.594
South Alabama	11	–	7	.611	21	–	12	.636
Arkansas State	11	–	7	.611	20	–	12	.625
Southern Miss	9	–	9	.500	19	–	16	.543
James Madison	9	–	9	.500	18	–	15	.545
Georgia Southern	8	–	10	.444	21	–	16	.568
Old Dominion	7	–	11	.389	12	–	21	.364
Louisiana	7	–	11	.389	11	–	22	.333
Georgia State	7	–	11	.389	10	–	22	.313
Louisiana–Monroe	1	–	17	.056	4	–	28	.125
† 2026 Sun Belt tournament winner

The 2025–26 Troy Trojans men's basketball team represented Troy University in the 2025–26 NCAA Division I men's basketball season. The Trojans, led by seventh-year head coach Scott Cross, played their home games at Trojan Arena in Troy, Alabama as members of the Sun Belt Conference.

== Previous season ==
The Trojans finished the 2024–25 season 23–11, 13–5 in Sun Belt play to finish in a four-way tie for first place. The Trojans won the Sun Belt Conference tournament against Arkansas State. They would secure a spot in the NCAA tournament, where they lost to Kentucky in the first round.

== Offseason ==
=== Departures ===
Name	Number	Pos.	Height	Weight	Year	Hometown	Reason for departure
Marcus Rigsby Jr.	2	G	6'3"	203	Junior	Fort Worth, TX	Transferred to UT Arlington
Myles Rigsby	4	F	6'6"	190	Sophomore	Fort Worth, TX	Transferred to Tulsa
Tayton Conerway	12	G	6'3"	186	Senior	Burleson, TX	Transferred to Indiana
Jackson Fields	15	F	6'8"	210	Junior	Missouri City, TX	Transferred to West Virginia
Jackson Porch	20	G	6'0"	175	Freshman	Guntersville, AL	Transferred to Calhoun CC
Braydon Whitaker	21	G	6'0"	185	Senior	Slocomb, AL	Graduated
Randarius Jones	24	C	6'7"	235	Senior	Monroe, LA	Transferred to Grambling State

=== Incoming transfers ===
Name	Number	Pos.	Height	Weight	Year	Hometown	Previous School
Javier Gilgeous-Glasgow	7	G	6'2"	150	Senior	Brampton, Ontario	Toronto Metropolitan
Corbin Green	22	F	6'4"	230	Senior	Midlothian, TX	Texas Tech

=== Recruiting classes ===
==== 2025 recruiting class ====
College recruiting information
Name	Hometown	School	Height	Weight	Commit date
Emmanuel Clarton; G	Livingston, AL	Sumter Central High School	6 ft 5 in (1.96 m)	190 lb (86 kg)	
Emmanuel Clarton; G	Recruit ratings: No ratings found				
Javen Colbert; G	Decatur, TX	Decatur High School	6 ft 1 in (1.85 m)	155 lb (70 kg)	
Javen Colbert; G	Recruit ratings: No ratings found				
Overall recruit ranking:
Note: In many cases, Scout, Rivals, 247Sports, On3, and ESPN may conflict in their listings of height and weight.; In these cases, the average was taken. ESPN grades are on a 100-point scale.; Sources: "2025 Team Ranking". Rivals.

== Preseason ==
=== Preseason Sun Belt Conference poll ===
The Trojans were picked to finish in fourth place in the conference's preseason poll. Junior forward Thomas Dowd was named to the conference preseason first team.

Coaches poll
Predicted finish	Team (1st place Votes)
1	James Madison - 175 (1)
2	Arkansas State - 154 (3)
3	South Alabama - 152 (4)
4	Troy - 148 (1)
5	Old Dominion - 145 (2)
6	Marshall - 128 (1)
7	App State - 123 (1)
8	Texas State - 106
9	Louisiana - 95 (1)
10	Georgia Southern - 66
11	Georgia State - 59
12	Southern Miss - 57
13	Coastal Carolina - 43
14	ULM - 19

== Roster ==
2025–26 Troy Trojans men's basketball team
Players
Coaches

Pos.	#	Name	Height	Weight	Year	Previous school	Hometown
F	0	Kerrington Kiel	6 ft 6 in (1.98 m)	195 lb (88 kg)	RS So	Ramsay High School	Birmingham, Alabama
F	1	Thomas Dowd	6 ft 8 in (2.03 m)	225 lb (102 kg)	Jr	Dothan High School	Dothan, Alabama
G	2	Cobi Campbell	6 ft 2 in (1.88 m)	195 lb (88 kg)	RS Jr	North Idaho College	Puyallup, Washington
G	3	Cooper Campbell	6 ft 1 in (1.85 m)	195 lb (88 kg)	So	Phoenix Prep	Puyallup, Washington
G	4	Emmanuel Clarton	6 ft 5 in (1.96 m)	190 lb (86 kg)	Fr	Sumter Central High School	Livingston, Alabama
G	5	Javen Colbert	6 ft 1 in (1.85 m)	155 lb (70 kg)	Fr	Decatur High School	Decatur, Texas
G	7	Javier Gilgeous-Glasgow	6 ft 2 in (1.88 m)	—	Sr	Toronto Metropolitan University	Brampton, Ontario
F	10	Jerrell Bellamy	6 ft 9 in (2.06 m)	235 lb (107 kg)	RS Sr	Chattahoochee Valley Community College	Phenix City, Alabama
F	11	Victor Valdes	6 ft 7 in (2.01 m)	235 lb (107 kg)	Jr	Zentro Basket Madrid	Monterrey, Nuevo León
G	14	Kamryn Mitchell (W)	6 ft 4 in (1.93 m)	190 lb (86 kg)	Sr	Houston Academy	Dothan, Alabama
F	22	Corbin Green	6 ft 4 in (1.93 m)	230 lb (104 kg)	Sr	Texas Tech	Midlothian, Texas
F	25	Evan Griffin	6 ft 9 in (2.06 m)	230 lb (104 kg)	RS Fr	Geneva High School	Geneva, Alabama
G	30	Hikaru Awata	5 ft 7 in (1.7 m)	170 lb (77 kg)	RS Fr	Hachioji Senior High School	Hachioji, Japan
F	33	Theo Seng	6 ft 9 in (2.06 m)	225 lb (102 kg)	GS	Eastern Arizona College	Davis, California
G	95	Austin Cross	6 ft 3 in (1.91 m)	200 lb (91 kg)	RS Fr	Charles Henderson High School	Mansfield, Texas

Head coach

- Scott Cross (UT Arlington)

Assistant coach(es)

- Kaleb Canales (UT Arlington)
- Scott Campbell (Seattle Pacific)
- Larry Cordaro (LSU)
- Brandon Gilbert (North Texas)
- Kelvin Lewis (Houston)

Legend

- (C) Team captain
- (S) Suspended
- (I) Ineligible
- (W) Walk-on
- Injured
- Current redshirt

Roster
Last update: September 25, 2025

== Schedule and results ==
Date time, TV	Rank^{#}	Opponent^{#}	Result	Record	High points	High rebounds	High assists	Site (attendance) city, state
Exhibition
October 26, 2025*; 1:00 p.m.		at Georgia	L 65–81		20 – Cob. Campbell	9 – Seng	4 – Coo. Campbell	Stegeman Coliseum (5,715); Athens, GA
Regular season
November 3, 2025*; 6:00 p.m., ESPN+		at Kent State; MAC–SBC Challenge	W 103–97 ^{OT}	1–0	24 – Seng	13 – Dowd	8 – Coo. Campbell	MAC Center (2,131); Kent, OH
November 7, 2025*; 6:00 p.m., ESPN+		at Furman	W 64–61	2–0	21 – Coo. Campbell	7 – Seng	3 – Coo. Campbell	Timmons Arena (2,207); Greenville, SC
November 11, 2025*; 6:00 p.m., ESPN+		Pensacola Christian	W 121–56	3–0	16 – Dowd	8 – Dowd	8 – Coo. Campbell	Trojan Arena (3,094); Troy, AL
November 14, 2025*; 9:00 p.m., ESPN+		at Loyola Marymount	L 63–74	3–1	24 – Vide	7 – McBride	5 – Vide	Gersten Pavilion (833); Los Angeles, CA
November 16, 2025*; 7:00 p.m., ESPN+		at Cal State Northridge	L 85–94	3–2	18 – Cob. Campbell	8 – Dowd	8 – Valdes	Premier America Credit Union Arena (659); Northridge, CA
November 18, 2025*; 9:00 p.m., MW Network		at San Diego State	W 108–107 ^{2OT}	4–2	25 – Dowd	19 – Dowd	4 – Tied	Viejas Arena (11,531); San Diego, CA
November 20, 2025*; 9:00 p.m., BTN		at USC	L 106–107 ^{3OT}	4–3	32 – Campbell	12 – Tied	8 – Coo. Campbell	Galen Center (3,342); Los Angeles, CA
November 24, 2025*; 10:00 a.m., FloCollege		vs. Toledo; Coconut Hoops Royal Palm Division Semifinals	L 68–75	4–4	18 – Seng	11 – Dowd	5 – Coo. Campbell	Alico Arena (212); Fort Myers, FL
November 26, 2025*; 10:00 a.m., FloCollege		vs. Saint Francis (PA); Coconut Hoops Royal Palm Division Consolation	W 74–64	5–4	18 – Dowd	11 – Dowd	4 – Coo. Campbell	Alico Arena (101); Fort Myers, FL
December 1, 2025*; 6:00 p.m., ESPN+		West Georgia	L 89–93 ^{2OT}	5–5	29 – Valdes	14 – Dowd	6 – Valdes	Trojan Arena (2,223); Troy, AL
December 6, 2025*; 3:30 p.m., ESPN+		LaGrange	W 101–47	6–5	14 – Griffin	11 – Bellamy	6 – Colbert	Trojan Arena (2,014); Troy, AL
December 14, 2025*; 2:00 p.m., ESPN2		at UAB	W 86–85	7–5	26 – Valdes	8 – Seng	9 – Coo. Campbell	Bartow Arena (3,542); Birmingham, AL
December 20, 2025; 1:00 p.m., ESPN+		Marshall	W 70–63	8–5 (1–0)	18 – Tied	9 – Dowd	6 – Valdes	Trojan Arena (2,181); Troy, AL
December 31, 2025; 1:00 p.m., ESPN+		Texas State	W 100–80	9–5 (2–0)	22 – Dowd	9 – Kiel	6 – Coo. Campbell	Trojan Arena (2,570); Troy, AL
January 3, 2026; 3:30 p.m., ESPN+		South Alabama	W 59–49	10–5 (3–0)	18 – Dowd	15 – Dowd	6 – Coo. Campbell	Trojan Arena (3,639); Troy, AL
January 7, 2026; 7:00 p.m., ESPN+		at Arkansas State	L 74–86	10–6 (3–1)	23 – Seng	10 – Dowd	7 – Coo. Campbell	First National Bank Arena (3,782); Jonesboro, AR
January 10, 2026; 12:00 p.m., ESPN+		at Louisiana	W 90–70	11–6 (4–1)	15 – Dowd	8 – Dowd	7 – Valdes	Cajundome (2,318); Lafayette, LA
January 14, 2026; 6:00 p.m., ESPN+		Southern Miss	W 91–65	12–6 (5–1)	30 – Cob. Campbell	10 – Dowd	4 – Dowd	Trojan Arena (2,946); Troy, AL
January 17, 2026; 3:30 p.m., ESPN+		Arkansas State	W 99–74	13–6 (6–1)	24 – Dowd	10 – Dowd	14 – Valdes	Trojan Arena (3,321); Troy, AL
January 21, 2026; 6:00 p.m., ESPN+		at Old Dominion	W 83–77 ^{2OT}	14–6 (7–1)	24 – Seng	15 – Dowd	5 – Coo. Campbell	Chartway Arena (5,263); Norfolk, VA
January 24, 2026; 2:00 p.m., ESPN+		at Georgia Southern	W 83–78	15–6 (8–1)	22 – Valdes	12 – Dowd	3 – Tied	Hill Convocation Center (3,025); Statesboro, GA
January 29, 2026; 6:00 p.m., ESPN+		James Madison	L 64–73	15–7 (8–2)	16 – Valdes	10 – Dowd	6 – Dowd	Trojan Arena (2,602); Troy, AL
January 31, 2026; 3:30 p.m., ESPN+		Appalachian State	L 44–66	15–8 (8–3)	13 – Seng	8 – Dowd	5 – Coo. Campbell	Trojan Arena (3,256); Troy, AL
February 4, 2026; 6:00 p.m., ESPN+		at Georgia State	W 74–63	16–8 (9–3)	16 – Dowd	15 – Dowd	9 – Valdes	GSU Convocation Center (2,037); Atlanta, GA
February 7, 2026*; 5:00 p.m., ESPN2		Akron; MAC–SBC Challenge	W 79–69	17–8	25 – Coo. Campbell	8 – Dowd	6 – Valdes	Trojan Arena (3,712); Troy, AL
February 11, 2026; 7:00 p.m., ESPN+		at Texas State	L 62–74	17–9 (9–4)	22 – Valdes	6 – Dowd	3 – Dowd	Strahan Arena (2,741); San Marcos, TX
February 14, 2026; 7:30 p.m., ESPN+		at Southern Miss	L 65–69	17–10 (9–5)	13 – Dowd	8 – Tied	6 – Valdes	Reed Green Coliseum (2,821); Hattiesburg, MS
February 18, 2026; 6:30 p.m., ESPN+		at Louisiana–Monroe	W 77–76	18–10 (10–5)	15 – Kiel	11 – Dowd	6 – Dowd	Fant–Ewing Coliseum (1,621); Monroe, LA
February 21, 2026; 3:00 p.m., ESPN+		at South Alabama	L 54–65	18–11 (10–6)	26 – Coo. Campbell	9 – Bellamy	4 – Cob. Campbell	Mitchell Center (5,250); Mobile, AL
February 24, 2026; 6:00 p.m., ESPN+		Louisiana	W 78–59	19–11 (11–6)	25 – Bellamy	8 – Dowd	8 – Coo. Campbell	Trojan Arena (3,035); Troy, AL
February 27, 2026; 6:00 p.m., ESPN+		Louisiana–Monroe	W 80–65	20–11 (12–6)	22 – Dowd	11 – Dowd	6 – Valdes	Trojan Arena (3,339); Troy, AL
Sun Belt Tournament
March 8, 2026; 5:00 p.m., ESPN+	(1)	vs. (8) Southern Miss; Semifinal	W 78–70	21–11	22 – Bellamy	8 – Dowd	5 – Valdes	Pensacola Bay Center (1,850); Pensacola, FL
March 9, 2026; 6:00 p.m., ESPN2	(1)	vs. (10) Georgia Southern; Championship	W 77–61	22–11	23 – Dowd	13 – Dowd	6 – Valdes	Pensacola Bay Center (2,555); Pensacola, FL
NCAA Tournament
March 19, 2026; 11:40 a.m., truTV	(13 S)	vs. (4 S) No. 15 Nebraska; First round	L 47–76	22–12	14 – Valdes	9 – Dowd	5 – Coo. Campbell	Paycom Center (15,677); Oklahoma City, OK
*Non-conference game. ^{#}Rankings from AP Poll. (#) Tournament seedings in parentheses. S=South. All times are in Central.
