= 2025–26 Old Dominion Monarchs men's basketball team =

American college basketball season

2025–26 Old Dominion Monarchs men's basketball
- Conference: Sun Belt Conference
- Record: 12–21 (7–11 Sun Belt)
- Head coach: Mike Jones (2nd season)
- Assistant coaches: Jamal Robinson; Ryan Nadeau; James Robinson
- Home arena: Chartway Arena

2025–26 Sun Belt Conference men's basketball standings
	Conf.				Overall
Team	W		L	PCT	W		L	PCT
Troy †	12	–	6	.667	22	–	12	.647
Marshall	11	–	7	.611	19	–	13	.594
Coastal Carolina	11	–	7	.611	19	–	13	.594
Appalachian State	11	–	7	.611	19	–	13	.594
Texas State	11	–	7	.611	19	–	13	.594
South Alabama	11	–	7	.611	21	–	12	.636
Arkansas State	11	–	7	.611	20	–	12	.625
Southern Miss	9	–	9	.500	19	–	16	.543
James Madison	9	–	9	.500	18	–	15	.545
Georgia Southern	8	–	10	.444	21	–	16	.568
Old Dominion	7	–	11	.389	12	–	21	.364
Louisiana	7	–	11	.389	11	–	22	.333
Georgia State	7	–	11	.389	10	–	22	.313
Louisiana–Monroe	1	–	17	.056	4	–	28	.125
† 2026 Sun Belt tournament winner

The 2025–26 Old Dominion Monarchs men's basketball team represented Old Dominion University during the 2025–26 NCAA Division I men's basketball season. The Monarchs, led by second-year head coach Mike Jones, played their home games at Chartway Arena in Norfolk, Virginia as members of the Sun Belt Conference.

== Previous season ==
The Monarchs finished the 2024–25 season 15–20, 8–10 in Sun Belt play, to finish in a four-way tie for eighth place. They defeated Louisiana, Texas State, and Appalachian State, before falling to eventual tournament champions Troy in the quarterfinals of the Sun Belt tournament.

== Preseason ==
On October 20, 2025, the Sun Belt released their preseason poll. Old Dominion was picked to finish fifth in the conference, while receiving two first-place vote.

=== Preseason rankings ===
Sun Belt Preseason Poll
Place	Team	Points
1	James Madison	175 (1)
2	Arkansas State	154 (3)
3	South Alabama	152 (4)
4	Troy	148 (1)
5	Old Dominion	145 (2)
6	Marshall	128 (1)
7	Appalachian State	123 (1)
8	Texas State	106
9	Louisiana	95 (1)
10	Georgia Southern	66
11	Georgia State	59
12	Southern Miss	57
13	Coastal Carolina	43
14	Louisiana–Monroe	19
(#) first-place votes

=== Sun Belt Preseason Player of the Year ===
Sun Belt Preseason Player of the Year
Player	Year	Position
Robert Davis Jr.	Junior	Guard

=== Preseason All-Sun Belt Teams ===
Preseason All-Sun Belt Teams
Team	Player	Year	Position
First	Robert Davis Jr.	Junior	Guard
Third	Jordan Battle	Senior	Guard

== Roster ==
2025–26 Old Dominion Monarchs men's basketball team
Players
Coaches

Pos.	#	Name	Height	Weight	Year	Previous school	Hometown
G	0	KC Shaw	6 ft 4 in (1.93 m)	195 lb (88 kg)	Sr	Maryland Eastern Shore	Charlotte, North Carolina
F	1	Stephaun Walker	6 ft 7 in (2.01 m)	220 lb (100 kg)	Sr	Robert Morris	Washington, D.C.
G	2	Zacch Wiggins	6 ft 4 in (1.93 m)	200 lb (91 kg)	Fr	Wesleyan Christian Academy	Greensboro, North Carolina
G	3	Scottie Hubbard	6 ft 6 in (1.98 m)	210 lb (95 kg)	So	Jackson-Reed High School	Washington, D.C.
G	4	Robert Davis Jr.	6 ft 6 in (1.98 m)	190 lb (86 kg)	Jr	UMass	Detroit, Michigan
G	6	LJ Thomas	6 ft 2 in (1.88 m)	205 lb (93 kg)	Sr	Austin Peay	Plant City, Florida
G/F	7	Drew McKenna	6 ft 7 in (2.01 m)	220 lb (100 kg)	So	Georgetown	Laurel, Maryland
F	8	Donovan Raymond	6 ft 10 in (2.08 m)	225 lb (102 kg)	So	Hampton	Charlotte, North Carolina
F	10	Elijah Flowers	6 ft 7 in (2.01 m)	195 lb (88 kg)	Fr	Brewster Academy	Washington, D.C.
G	11	Rieco Hellams	5 ft 10 in (1.78 m)	165 lb (75 kg)	Jr	Our Lady of Good Counsel High School	Washington, D.C.
F	13	Jared Turner	6 ft 8 in (2.03 m)	215 lb (98 kg)	Jr	Northeastern	Silver Spring, Maryland
G	15	CJ Parker	6 ft 6 in (1.98 m)	210 lb (95 kg)	So	Maury High School	Norfolk, Virginia
G	23	Jordan Battle	6 ft 2 in (1.88 m)	190 lb (86 kg)	Sr	Coastal Carolina	Norfolk, Virginia
G	30	Cooper Jones	6 ft 2 in (1.88 m)	175 lb (79 kg)	Sr	Walsingham Academy	Lanexa, Virginia
F	35	Caelum Swanton-Rodger	7 ft 0 in (2.13 m)	240 lb (109 kg)	Sr	Maryland	Calgary, Alberta
F	42	Ben Nacey	6 ft 8 in (2.03 m)	250 lb (113 kg)	So	Frank W. Cox High School	Virginia Beach, Virginia

Head coach

- Mike Jones (Old Dominion)

Assistant coach(es)

- Jamal Robinson (Virginia)
- Ryan Nadeau (Michigan State)
- James Robinson (Pittsburgh)

Legend

- (C) Team captain
- (S) Suspended
- (I) Ineligible
- (W) Walk-on
- Injured
- Current redshirt

Roster
Last update: November 7, 2025

== Schedule and results ==
Date time, TV	Rank^{#}	Opponent^{#}	Result	Record	High points	High rebounds	High assists	Site (attendance) city, state
Exhibition
October 26, 2025*; 2:00 pm		Hampton	L 79–82		–	–	–	Chartway Arena; Norfolk, VA
Regular season
November 3, 2025*; 7:00 pm, ESPN+		at Miami (OH); MAC-SBC Challenge	L 72–87	0–1	13 – Thomas	7 – Battle	6 – Thomas	Millett Hall (2,131); Oxford, OH
November 6, 2025*; 7:00 pm, ESPN+		Randolph	W 93–53	1–1	22 – Shaw	7 – Swanton-Rodger	3 – Thomas	Chartway Arena (4,411); Norfolk, VA
November 11, 2025*; 7:00 pm, ESPN+		Norfolk State; Rivalry	W 60–57	2–1	20 – Thomas	6 – Swanton-Rodger	3 – Thomas	Chartway Arena (7,951); Norfolk, VA
November 15, 2025*; 6:00 pm, ESPN+		at George Washington	L 73–96	2–2	14 – Tied	7 – Hubbard	5 – Thomas	Charles E. Smith Center (2,179); Washington, D.C.
November 18, 2025*; 7:00 pm, ESPN+		at Xavier	L 69–99	2–3	13 – Thomas	4 – Swanton-Rodger	6 – Thomas	Cintas Center (9,326); Cincinnati, OH
November 21, 2025*; 7:00 pm, ESPN+		Morgan State	W 88–56	3–3	18 – Wiggins	8 – Battle	5 – Battle	Chartway Arena (4,844); Norfolk, VA
November 23, 2025*; 2:00 pm, FloCollege		at Drexel	L 71–75	3–4	21 – Battle	9 – Battle	5 – Battle	Daskalakis Athletic Center (767); Philadelphia, PA
November 25, 2025*; 7:00 pm, ESPN+		at Villanova	L 75–89	3–5	19 – Battle	7 – McKenna	5 – Thomas	Finneran Pavilion (6,501); Villanova, PA
November 30, 2025*; 2:00 pm, FloCollege		at William & Mary; Rivalry	L 75–88	3–6	24 – Battle	7 – Battle	3 – Tied	Kaplan Arena (3,424); Williamsburg, VA
December 6, 2025*; 12:30 pm, USA		at Richmond	L 77–86	3–7	19 – Thomas	7 – Tied	6 – Shaw	Robins Center (4,602); Richmond, VA
December 13, 2025*; 12:30 pm, USA		at George Mason	L 61–73	3–8	14 – Tied	9 – Swanton-Rodger	3 – Davis Jr.	EagleBank Arena (4,433); Fairfax, VA
December 17, 2025; 7:00 pm, ESPN+		James Madison; Royal Rivalry	W 77–68	4–8 (1–0)	22 – Shaw	7 – Turner	3 – Battle	Chartway Arena (5,788); Norfolk, VA
December 20, 2025; 2:00 pm, ESPN+		Coastal Carolina	L 74–76	4–9 (1–1)	23 – Battle	10 – Tied	3 – Battle	Chartway Arena (4,367); Norfolk, VA
December 28, 2025*; 6:00 pm, BTN		at Maryland	L 58–73	4–10	19 – Shaw	7 – Raymond	1 – Tied	Xfinity Center (13,254); College Park, MD
December 31, 2025; 2:00 pm, ESPN+		Appalachian State	L 73–81	4–11 (1–2)	20 – Battle	6 – Battle	4 – Tied	Chartway Arena (4,184); Norfolk, VA
January 3, 2026; 3:30 pm, ESPN+		Georgia Southern	L 86–93	4–12 (1–3)	23 – Shaw	9 – McKenna	5 – Battle	Chartway Arena (4,665); Norfolk, VA
January 8, 2026; 7:00 pm, ESPN+		at Coastal Carolina	W 70–66	5–12 (2–3)	29 – Davis Jr.	7 – Tied	3 – Tied	HTC Center (1,302); Conway, SC
January 10, 2026; 4:00 pm, ESPN+		at James Madison; Royal Rivalry	L 69–70	5–13 (2–4)	18 – Shaw	7 – Shaw	2 – Tied	Atlantic Union Bank Center (5,585); Harrisonburg, VA
January 15, 2026; 7:00 pm, ESPN+		at Georgia Southern	L 84–87	5–14 (2–5)	20 – Davis Jr.	7 – Turner	5 – Thomas	Hill Convocation Center (2,864); Statesboro, GA
January 17, 2026; 1:00 pm, ESPN+		at Appalachian State	W 75–73	6–14 (3–5)	25 – Battle	7 – Tied	4 – Tied	Holmes Center (2,415); Boone, NC
January 21, 2026; 7:00 pm, ESPN+		Troy	L 77–83 ^{2OT}	6–15 (3–6)	34 – Shaw	9 – Battle	3 – Thomas	Chartway Arena (5,263); Norfolk, VA
January 28, 2026; 8:00 pm, ESPN+		at Arkansas State	W 75–71	7–15 (4–6)	20 – Battle	9 – Swanton-Rodger	6 – Battle	First National Bank Arena (4,776); Jonesboro, AR
January 31, 2026; 1:00 pm, ESPN+		at Texas State	L 64–81	7–16 (4–7)	20 – Shaw	11 – Shaw	4 – Shaw	Strahan Arena (1,667); San Marcos, TX
February 4, 2026; 7:00 pm, ESPN+		Louisiana–Monroe	L 79–85	7–17 (4–8)	23 – Battle	7 – Tied	3 – Battle	Chartway Arena (4,311); Norfolk, VA
February 7, 2026*; 7:00 pm, ESPN+		Ohio; MAC-SBC Challenge	W 78–72	8–17	17 – Shaw	7 – Swanton-Rodger	6 – Thomas	Chartway Arena (6,657); Norfolk, VA
February 11, 2026; 7:30 pm, ESPN+		Marshall	L 79–81	8–18 (4–9)	18 – Thomas	7 – Turner	6 – Battle	Chartway Arena (4,367); Norfolk, VA
February 14, 2026; 3:30 pm, ESPN+		Georgia State	W 78–55	9–18 (5–9)	28 – Shaw	10 – Swanton-Rodger	5 – Battle	Chartway Arena (4,759); Norfolk, VA
February 16, 2026; 5:00 pm, ESPN+		Louisiana	W 83–72	10–18 (6–9)	27 – Battle	4 – Tied	5 – Shaw	Chartway Arena (6,058); Norfolk, VA
February 21, 2026; 3:00 pm, ESPN+		at Southern Miss	L 81–86	10–19 (6–10)	18 – Shaw	6 – Thomas	4 – Thomas	Reed Green Coliseum (2,747); Hattiesburg, MS
February 24, 2026; 7:00 pm, ESPN+		at Marshall	L 88–97	10–20 (6–11)	26 – Shaw	7 – Shaw	4 – Battle	Cam Henderson Center (4,156); Huntington, WV
February 27, 2026; 7:00 pm, ESPN+		at Georgia State	W 81–73	11–20 (7–11)	20 – Battle	7 – Wiggins	4 – Thomas	GSU Convocation Center (2,752); Atlanta, GA
Sun Belt tournament
March 3, 2026; 8:30 p.m., ESPN+	(11)	vs. (14) Louisiana–Monroe; First round	W 87–80	12–20	25 – Shaw	9 – Shaw	7 – Shaw	Pensacola Bay Center (719); Pensacola, FL
March 4, 2026; 8:30 p.m., ESPN+	(11)	vs. (10) Georgia Southern; Second round	L 84–88	12–21	45 – Battle	8 – Hubbard	5 – Thomas	Pensacola Bay Center; Pensacola, FL
*Non-conference game. ^{#}Rankings from AP Poll. (#) Tournament seedings in parentheses. All times are in Eastern.
