= 2025–26 Coastal Carolina Chanticleers men's basketball team =

American college basketball season

2025–26 Coastal Carolina Chanticleers men's basketball
- Conference: Sun Belt Conference
- Record: 19–13 (11–7 Sun Belt)
- Head coach: Justin Gray (2nd season)
- Assistant coaches: Ryne Lightfoot; Jason Allison; Kylen Butler; Brian Graves
- Home arena: HTC Center

2025–26 Sun Belt Conference men's basketball standings
	Conf.				Overall
Team	W		L	PCT	W		L	PCT
Troy †	12	–	6	.667	22	–	11	.667
Marshall	11	–	7	.611	19	–	13	.594
Coastal Carolina	11	–	7	.611	19	–	13	.594
Appalachian State	11	–	7	.611	19	–	13	.594
Texas State	11	–	7	.611	19	–	13	.594
South Alabama	11	–	7	.611	21	–	11	.656
Arkansas State	11	–	7	.611	20	–	12	.625
Southern Miss	9	–	9	.500	19	–	16	.543
James Madison	9	–	9	.500	18	–	15	.545
Georgia Southern	8	–	10	.444	21	–	16	.568
Old Dominion	7	–	11	.389	12	–	21	.364
Louisiana	7	–	11	.389	11	–	22	.333
Georgia State	7	–	11	.389	10	–	22	.313
Louisiana–Monroe	1	–	17	.056	4	–	28	.125
† 2026 Sun Belt tournament winner As of March 9, 2026

The 2025–26 Coastal Carolina Chanticleers men's basketball team represented Coastal Carolina University in the 2025–26 NCAA Division I men's basketball season. The Chanticleers, led by 2nd-year head coach Justin Gray, played their home games at the HTC Center in Conway, South Carolina as members of the Sun Belt Conference.

== Previous season ==
The Chanticleers finished the 2024–25 season 10–22, 3–15 in Sun Belt play, to finish in thirteenth place. They lost to Southern Miss in the first round of the Sun Belt Conference tournament.

== Preseason ==
=== Preseason Sun Belt Conference poll ===
The Chanticleers were picked to finish in thirteenth place in the conference's preseason poll. Junior guard RaSheed Jones was named to the conference preseason second team.

Coaches poll
Predicted finish	Team (1st place Votes)
1	James Madison - 175 (1)
2	Arkansas State - 154 (3)
3	South Alabama - 152 (4)
4	Troy - 148 (1)
5	Old Dominion - 145 (2)
6	Marshall - 128 (1)
7	App State - 123 (1)
8	Texas State - 106
9	Louisiana - 95 (1)
10	Georgia Southern - 66
11	Georgia State - 59
12	Southern Miss - 57
13	Coastal Carolina - 43
14	ULM - 19

== Roster ==
2025–26 Coastal Carolina Chanticleers men's basketball team
Players
Coaches

Pos.	#	Name	Height	Weight	Year	Previous school	Hometown
G	0	AJ Dancler	6 ft 2 in (1.88 m)	180 lb (82 kg)	Jr	Le Moyne	Indianapolis, IN
G	1	Tristan Thompson	6 ft 5 in (1.96 m)	215 lb (98 kg)	Fr	Wilson	Florence, SC
G	2	Rasheed Jones	6 ft 6 in (1.98 m)	190 lb (86 kg)	RS Jr	Western Carolina	Marion, IN
G	3	DaJohn Craig	6 ft 1 in (1.85 m)	165 lb (75 kg)	So	Oregon State	Indianapolis, IN
F/C	4	Nadjrick Peat	6 ft 10 in (2.08 m)	235 lb (107 kg)	GS	Hawaii–Hilo	Alexandria, Jamaica
G	5	Joshua Beadle	6 ft 3 in (1.91 m)	180 lb (82 kg)	GS	Boston College	Columbia, SC
G	7	Andre Mulibea	6 ft 6 in (1.98 m)	225 lb (102 kg)	RS Sr	Eastern Washington	Kigoma, Tanzania
G	11	Jackson Keil	6 ft 2 in (1.88 m)	190 lb (86 kg)	Sr	Western Wyoming Community College	Sterling, CO
F	12	Devin Brown	6 ft 7 in (2.01 m)	225 lb (102 kg)	Fr	Academy of Science	Milwaukee, WI
F	13	Braeden MacVicar	6 ft 11 in (2.11 m)	235 lb (107 kg)	RS So	Rothesay Netherwood School	Port Williams, Nova Scotia
F/C	14	Jerry Ngopot	6 ft 10 in (2.08 m)	250 lb (113 kg)	GS	Louisiana-Monroe	Bangui, Central African Republic
F	15	Derrick Green	6 ft 9 in (2.06 m)	275 lb (125 kg)	So	Brunswick Community College	Fayetteville, NC
F	20	Connor Martin	6 ft 4 in (1.93 m)	205 lb (93 kg)	RS Jr	Trevecca	Clinton, TN
F	21	Reggie Hill	6 ft 7 in (2.01 m)	225 lb (102 kg)	GS	Midwestern State	Melbourne, FL
G	30	Charles Dunlap	6 ft 2 in (1.88 m)	180 lb (82 kg)	Sr	Spring Valley	Columbia, SC

Head coach

- Justin Gray (Wake Forest)

Assistant coach(es)

- Ryne Lightfoot (Bethel (IN))
- Jason Allison (Liberty)
- Kylen Butler (Indianapolis)
- Brian Graves (Catawba)

Legend

- (C) Team captain
- (S) Suspended
- (I) Ineligible
- (W) Walk-on
- Injured
- Current redshirt

Roster
Last update: October 14, 2025

== Schedule and results ==
Date time, TV	Rank^{#}	Opponent^{#}	Result	Record	High points	High rebounds	High assists	Site (attendance) city, state
Regular season
November 3, 2025*; 7:00 p.m., ESPN+		at Western Michigan; MAC–SBC Challenge	L 71–76	0–1	21 – Tied	8 – Peat	4 – Beadle	University Arena (1,443); Kalamazoo, MI
November 7, 2025*; 7:00 p.m., ESPN+		Virginia–Lynchburg	W 121–44	1–1	19 – Ngopot	13 – MacVicar	6 – Jones	HTC Center (2,230); Conway, SC
November 11, 2025*; 7:00 p.m., ESPN+		Winthrop	W 72–66	2–1	23 – Beadle	8 – Ngopot	4 – Jones	HTC Center (2,663); Conway, SC
November 14, 2025*; 7:00 p.m., ESPN+		at Jacksonville State	L 67–74	2–2	20 – Beadle	8 – Hill	3 – Tied	Pete Mathews Coliseum (2,023); Jacksonville, AL
November 21, 2025*; 7:00 p.m., ESPN+		at Western Illinois; Western Illinois MTE	W 84–64	3–2	20 – Jones	12 – Hill	4 – Tied	Western Hall (655); Macomb, IL
November 22, 2025*; 7:00 p.m., ESPN+		vs. North Dakota; Western Illinois MTE	W 75–58	4–2	31 – Dancler	7 – Thompson	6 – Dancler	Western Hall (165); Macomb, IL
November 23, 2025*; 5:00 p.m., ESPN+		at Illinois State	L 42–94	4–3	11 – Beadle	7 – Thompson	2 – Dancler	CEFCU Arena (3,512); Normal, IL
November 30, 2025*; 3:30 p.m., ESPN+		Alabama A&M	W 67–60	5–3	19 – Dancler	9 – Dancler	3 – Beadle	HTC Center (1,502); Conway, SC
December 3, 2025*; 7:00 p.m., ESPN+		at USC Upstate	L 78–85 ^{OT}	5–4	19 – Jones	8 – Peat	4 – Tied	G. B. Hodge Center (717); Spartanburg, SC
December 6, 2025*; 2:00 p.m., ESPN+		at Winthrop	W 88–84	6–4	23 – Jones	9 – Hill	5 – Jones	Winthrop Coliseum (1,626); Rock Hill, SC
December 13, 2025*; 8:00 p.m., MW Network		at Grand Canyon	L 61–82	6–5	18 – Beadle	6 – Hill	6 – Beadle	Global Credit Union Arena (7,102); Phoenix, AZ
December 18, 2025; 6:30 p.m., ESPN+		at Appalachian State	L 49–67	6–6 (0–1)	13 – Jones	7 – Tied	4 – Beadle	Holmes Center (1,447); Boone, NC
December 20, 2025; 2:00 p.m., ESPN+		at Old Dominion	W 76–74	7–6 (1–1)	23 – Jones	9 – Peat	4 – Beadle	Chartway Arena (4,367); Norfolk, VA
December 22, 2025*; 7:00 p.m., ESPN+		at Saint Joseph's	W 68–62	8–6	21 – Dancler	12 – Dancler	5 – Jones	Hagan Arena (1,697); Philadelphia, PA
January 1, 2026; 1:00 p.m., ESPN+		Georgia Southern	L 81–82 ^{OT}	8–7 (1–2)	21 – Beadle	15 – Peat	4 – Beadle	HTC Center (1,508); Conway, SC
January 3, 2026; 1:00 p.m., ESPN+		Georgia State	L 71–89	8–8 (1–3)	18 – Jones	7 – Tied	6 – Beadle	HTC Center (2,026); Conway, SC
January 8, 2026; 7:00 p.m., ESPN+		Old Dominion	L 66–70	8–9 (1–4)	18 – Beadle	8 – Dancler	3 – Tied	HTC Center (1,302); Conway, SC
January 10, 2026; 1:00 p.m., ESPN+		Appalachian State	W 67–62	9–9 (2–4)	25 – Beadle	7 – Beadle	5 – Beadle	HTC Center (1,672); Conway, SC
January 14, 2026; 7:00 p.m., ESPN+		at Marshall	W 85–83	10–9 (3–4)	26 – Tied	7 – Beadle	3 – Jones	Cam Henderson Center (3,857); Huntington, WV
January 17, 2026; 3:00 p.m., ESPN+		at Georgia Southern	W 79–75 ^{OT}	11–9 (4–4)	28 – Jones	10 – Dancler	2 – Tied	Hill Convocation Center (2,732); Statesboro, GA
January 22, 2026; 7:00 p.m., ESPN+		Texas State	W 72–70	12–9 (5–4)	32 – Beadle	7 – Beadle	3 – Dancler	HTC Center (2,126); Conway, SC
January 24, 2026; 1:00 p.m., ESPN+		Southern Miss	W 85–67	13–9 (6–4)	24 – Jones	8 – Dancler	5 – Jones	HTC Center (1,763); Conway, SC
January 29, 2026; 8:00 p.m., ESPN+		at South Alabama	L 48–53	13–10 (6–5)	11 – Beadle	9 – Peat	5 – Jones	Mitchell Center (2,016); Mobile, AL
February 1, 2026; 2:00 p.m., ESPN+		at Louisiana-Monroe	W 83–79	14–10 (7–5)	32 – Dancler	8 – Tied	6 – Jones	Fant–Ewing Coliseum (984); Monroe, LA
February 4, 2026; 7:00 p.m., ESPN+		Arkansas State	L 66–70	14–11 (7–6)	16 – Beadle	7 – Hill	8 – Jones	HTC Center (2,041); Conway, SC
February 7, 2026*; 1:00 p.m., ESPN+		UMass; MAC–SBC Challenge	W 94–91 ^{3OT}	15–11	26 – Jones	13 – Hill	4 – Jones	HTC Center (1,924); Conway, SC
February 12, 2026; 8:00 p.m., ESPN+		at Louisiana	W 69–65	16–11 (8–6)	29 – Beadle	6 – Peat	1 – Tied	Cajundome (2,516); Lafayette, LA
February 18, 2026; 7:00 p.m., ESPN+		James Madison	L 65–67	16–12 (8–7)	31 – Beadle	11 – Hill	4 – Jones	HTC Center (2,203); Conway, SC
February 21, 2026; 1:00 p.m., ESPN+		Marshall	W 79–75	17–12 (9–7)	29 – Jones	13 – Peat	5 – Beadle	HTC Center (2,140); Conway, SC
February 24, 2026; 7:30 p.m., ESPN+		at Georgia State	W 76–71	18–12 (10–7)	32 – Dancler	7 – Tied	4 – Beadle	GSU Convocation Center (2,267); Atlanta, GA
February 27, 2026; 8:00 p.m., ESPN+		at James Madison	W 69–68	19–12 (11–7)	29 – Beadle	10 – Peat	3 – Dancler	Atlantic Union Bank Center (4,042); Harrisonburg, VA
Sun Belt tournament
March 7, 2026; 9:00 p.m., ESPN+	(3)	vs. (10) Georgia Southern; Quarterfinals	L 72–96	19–13	23 – Beadle	7 – Tied	3 – Beadle	Pensacola Bay Center (1,685); Pensacola, FL
*Non-conference game. ^{#}Rankings from AP poll. (#) Tournament seedings in parentheses. All times are in Eastern.
