= 2025–26 Marshall Thundering Herd men's basketball team =

American college basketball season

2025–26 Marshall Thundering Herd men's basketball
- Conference: Sun Belt Conference
- Record: 19–13 (11–7 Sun Belt)
- Head coach: Cornelius Jackson (2nd season)
- Associate head coach: Rob Fulford
- Assistant coaches: Adam Williams; Steve Snell
- Home arena: Cam Henderson Center

2025–26 Sun Belt Conference men's basketball standings
	Conf.				Overall
Team	W		L	PCT	W		L	PCT
Troy †	12	–	6	.667	22	–	12	.647
Marshall	11	–	7	.611	19	–	13	.594
Coastal Carolina	11	–	7	.611	19	–	13	.594
Appalachian State	11	–	7	.611	19	–	13	.594
Texas State	11	–	7	.611	19	–	13	.594
South Alabama	11	–	7	.611	21	–	12	.636
Arkansas State	11	–	7	.611	20	–	12	.625
Southern Miss	9	–	9	.500	19	–	16	.543
James Madison	9	–	9	.500	18	–	15	.545
Georgia Southern	8	–	10	.444	21	–	16	.568
Old Dominion	7	–	11	.389	12	–	21	.364
Louisiana	7	–	11	.389	11	–	22	.333
Georgia State	7	–	11	.389	10	–	22	.313
Louisiana–Monroe	1	–	17	.056	4	–	28	.125
† 2026 Sun Belt tournament winner

The 2025–26 Marshall Thundering Herd men's basketball team represented Marshall University during the 2025–26 NCAA Division I men's basketball season. The Thundering Herd, led by second-year head coach Cornelius Jackson, played their home games at the Cam Henderson Center as members of the Sun Belt Conference. They finished the season 19–13, 11–7 in Sun Belt play to finish in a tie for second place. As the No. 2 seed in the Sun Belt tournament, they lost to Georgia Southern in the semifinals.

== Previous season ==
The Thundering Herd finished the season 20–13, 12–6 in Sun Belt play to finish in fifth place. As the No. 5 seed in the Sun Belt tournament, they defeated Georgia State in the fourth round before losing to Arkansas State in the quarterfinals.

== Offseason ==
=== Departures ===
Name	Number	Pos.	Height	Weight	Year	Hometown	Notes
Obinna Anochili-Killen	25	F	6'8"	220	GS Senior	Lagos, Nigeria	Graduated
Mikal Dawson	23	G	6'5"	222	GS Senior	Huntington, West Virginia	Graduated
Cade Gibbs	5	F	6'6"	222	Senior	Plainfield, Indiana	Graduated
Jakob Gibbs	4	F	6'5"	208	Senior	Plainfield, Indiana	Graduated
Nate Martin	41	F	6'8"	225	Senior	Houston, Texas	Graduated
Ryan Nutter	7	G	6'4"	189	Sophomore	Dublin, Ohio	Did not return
Dezayne Mingo	3	G	6'4"	185	Junior	Hamilton, Ontario	Transferred to Charlotte
Kycen Pruett	8	G	6'4"	184	Sophomore	Mount Dora, Florida	Transferred to Coastal Georgia
Chreighton Thieneman	13	G	6'5"	195	RS Junior	Louisville, Kentucky	Walk-on; did not return

=== Incoming transfers ===
Name	Number	Pos.	Height	Weight	Year	Hometown	Previous School
Wilson Dubinsky	3	G	6'3"	199	GS Senior	Ottawa, Ontario	South Carolina State
Andrew Fuquay	4	F	6'8"	221	Junior	Detroit, Michigan	Gillette
Caleb Hollenbeck	15	G	6'4"	189	Junior	Rapid City, South Dakota	Gillette
Shamarrie Hugie	9	G	6'6"	188	Junior	Savannah, Georgia	Cowley
Noah Otshudi	5	G	6'2"	198	Senior	Hamilton, Ontario	Western
Matt Van Komen	13	C	7'4"	255	GS Senior	Lehi, Utah	Elon

=== 2025 recruiting class ===
College recruiting
Name	Hometown	School	Height	Weight	Commit date
Bryce Slay; SG	Charlotte, North Carolina	United Faith Christian Academy	6 ft 5 in (1.96 m)	175 lb (79 kg)	Sep 5, 2024
Bryce Slay; SG	Recruit ratings: 247Sports: (NR)				
Landen Joseph; PG	Fort Lauderdale, Florida	Northeast High School	6 ft 2 in (1.88 m)	170 lb (77 kg)	Aug 14, 2025
Landen Joseph; PG	Recruit ratings: (NR)				
Overall recruit ranking: Rivals: NR 247Sports: 189 ESPN: NR
Note: In many cases, Scout, Rivals, 247Sports, On3, and ESPN may conflict in their listings of height and weight.; In these cases, the average was taken. ESPN grades are on a 100-point scale.; Sources: "Marshall Basketball Commitment List". Rivals.; "ESPN". ESPN.; "2025 Team Ranking". Rivals.

== Preseason ==
=== Preseason Sun Belt Conference poll ===
The Thundering Herd were picked to finish in sixth place in the conference's preseason poll. Graduate center Matt Von Komen was named to the conference preseason third team.

Coaches poll
Predicted finish	Team (1st place Votes)
1	James Madison - 175 (1)
2	Arkansas State - 154 (3)
3	South Alabama - 152 (4)
4	Troy - 148 (1)
5	Old Dominion - 145 (2)
6	Marshall - 128 (1)
7	App State - 123 (1)
8	Texas State - 106
9	Louisiana - 95 (1)
10	Georgia Southern - 66
11	Georgia State - 59
12	Southern Miss - 57
13	Coastal Carolina - 43
14	ULM - 19

== Roster ==
2025–26 Marshall Thundering Herd men's basketball team
Players
Coaches

Pos.	#	Name	Height	Weight	Year	Previous school	Hometown
G	0	Kai Spears (W)	6 ft 3 in (1.91 m)	175 lb (79 kg)	RS Jr	Alabama	Pittsburgh, Pennsylvania
G	1	Kaiden White	6 ft 3 in (1.91 m)	189 lb (86 kg)	So	Olympia	Orlando, Florida
F	2	Wyatt Fricks	6 ft 10 in (2.08 m)	216 lb (98 kg)	RS Sr	Winder-Barrow	Winder, Georgia
G	3	Wilson Dubinsky	6 ft 3 in (1.91 m)	199 lb (90 kg)	GS	South Carolina State	Ottawa, Ontario
F	4	Andrew Fuquay	6 ft 8 in (2.03 m)	221 lb (100 kg)	Jr	Gillette	Detroit, Michigan
G	5	Noah Otshudi	6 ft 2 in (1.88 m)	198 lb (90 kg)	Sr	Western	Hamilton, Ontario
G	6	Landen Joseph	6 ft 2 in (1.88 m)	163 lb (74 kg)	Fr	Northeast	Fort Lauderdale, Florida
G	8	Bryce Slay	6 ft 6 in (1.98 m)	184 lb (83 kg)	Fr	Carmel Christian	Charlotte, North Carolina
G	9	Shamarrie Hugie	6 ft 6 in (1.98 m)	188 lb (85 kg)	Jr	Cowley	Savannah, Georgia
F	11	Erich Harding	6 ft 10 in (2.08 m)	222 lb (101 kg)	So	Combine Academy	Charlotte, North Carolina
G	12	Will Moore	6 ft 7 in (2.01 m)	190 lb (86 kg)	So	West Forsyth	Cumming, Georgia
C	13	Matt Van Komen	7 ft 4 in (2.24 m)	255 lb (116 kg)	GS	Elon	Lehi, Utah
G	14	Grant Moore (W)	6 ft 6 in (1.98 m)	200 lb (91 kg)	RS Jr	Columbus State	Alpharetta, Georgia
G	15	Caleb Hollenbeck	6 ft 4 in (1.93 m)	189 lb (86 kg)	Jr	Gillette	Rapid City, South Dakota
G	50	Jalen Speer	6 ft 1 in (1.85 m)	186 lb (84 kg)	GS	Florida A&M	Gainesville, Florida

Head coach

- Cornelius Jackson (Marshall)

Assistant coach(es)

- Rob Fulford (Marshall)
- Adam Williams (Marshall)
- Steve Snell (Radford)

Legend

- (C) Team captain
- (S) Suspended
- (I) Ineligible
- (W) Walk-on
- Injured
- Current redshirt

Roster
Last update: 10/9/2025

== Schedule and results ==
Date time, TV	Rank^{#}	Opponent^{#}	Result	Record	High points	High rebounds	High assists	Site (attendance) city, state
Exhibition
October 21, 2025*; 7:00 p.m.		Alice Lloyd	W 123–63	–	21 – Otshudi	12 – Van Komen	8 – Speer	Cam Henderson Center; Huntington, WV
October 28, 2025*; 7:00 p.m.		Davis & Elkins	W 90–62	–	18 – Van Komen	13 – Van Komen	3 – Tied	Cam Henderson Center; Huntington, WV
Regular season
November 3, 2025*; 7:00 p.m., ESPN+		at UMass; MAC–SBC Challenge	W 78–72	1–0	16 – Fricks	9 – Dubinsky	9 – Otshudi	Mullins Center (2,256); Amherst, MA
November 8, 2025*; 2:00 p.m., ESPN+		at Toledo	W 85–73	2–0	20 – Speer	10 – Van Komen	5 – Speer	Savage Arena (4,026); Toledo, OH
November 12, 2025*; 7:00 p.m., ESPN+		Elon	W 96–89	3–0	34 – Fricks	9 – Fricks	12 – Speer	Cam Henderson Center (3,797); Huntington, WV
November 15, 2025*; 12:00 p.m., ACCNX		at Virginia	L 78–104	3–1	22 – Joseph	11 – Van Komen	4 – Otshudi	John Paul Jones Arena (11,776); Charlottesville, VA
November 20, 2025*; 4:00 p.m., ESPN+		Arkansas–Pine Bluff; Marshall MTE	W 98–70	4–1	23 – Hollenbeck	8 – Speer	11 – Speer	Cam Henderson Center (3,373); Huntington, WV
November 23, 2025*; 7:00 p.m., ESPN+		Mercyhurst; Marshall MTE	W 69–60	5–1	21 – Speer	13 – Van Komen	6 – Speer	Cam Henderson Center (3,433); Huntington, WV
November 26, 2025*; 4:00 p.m., ESPN+		Lipscomb	L 67–90	5–2	17 – Otshudi	6 – Joseph	4 – Otshudi	Cam Henderson Center (3,649); Huntington, WV
December 3, 2025*; 7:00 p.m., FloCollege		at UNC Wilmington	L 69–70	5–3	18 – Otshudi	7 – Van Komen	4 – Otshudi	Trask Coliseum (5,220); Wilmington, NC
December 6, 2025*; 4:00 p.m., ESPN+		at Ohio	L 81–88	5–4	21 – Otshudi	8 – Tied	5 – Speer	Convocation Center (3,723); Athens, OH
December 10, 2025*; 7:00 p.m., ESPN+		Western Kentucky	W 77–61	6–4	24 – Speer	13 – Van Komen	7 – Otshudi	Cam Henderson Center (4,420); Huntington, WV
December 13, 2025*; 4:00 p.m., ESPN+		Wright State	W 76–74	7–4	19 – Fricks	11 – Van Komen	7 – Speer	Cam Henderson Center (3,755); Huntington, WV
December 20, 2025; 2:00 p.m., ESPN+		at Troy	L 63–70	7–5 (0–1)	22 – Otshudi	9 – Harding	4 – Tied	Trojan Arena (2,181); Troy, AL
December 23, 2025*; 7:00 p.m., ESPN+		West Virginia Tech	W 102–52	8–5	25 – Hollenbeck	8 – Tied	7 – Speer	Cam Henderson Center (3,587); Huntington, WV
December 31, 2025; 4:00 p.m., ESPN+		Georgia State	W 84–80	9–5 (1–1)	26 – Speer	7 – Speer	7 – Speer	Cam Henderson Center (3,684); Huntington, WV
January 3, 2026; 4:00 p.m., ESPN+		Appalachian State	W 88–81	10–5 (2–1)	21 – Speer	6 – Tied	7 – Speer	Cam Henderson Center (3,933); Huntington, WV
January 7, 2026; 7:00 p.m., ESPN+		at James Madison	W 66–64	11–5 (3–1)	16 – Otshudi	5 – 3 tied	4 – Speer	Atlantic Union Bank Center (2,435); Harrisonburg, VA
January 10, 2026; 4:00 p.m., ESPN+		at Georgia State	L 73–81	11–6 (3-2)	21 – Fricks	10 – Fricks	8 – Speer	GSU Convocation Center (1,892); Atlanta, GA
January 14, 2026; 7:00 p.m., ESPN+		Coastal Carolina	L 83–85	11–7 (3–3)	30 – Otshudi	13 – Van Komen	4 – Tied	Cam Henderson Center (3,857); Huntington, WV
January 17, 2026; 4:00 p.m., ESPN+		James Madison	W 77–72	12–7 (4–3)	22 – Speer	13 – Van Komen	3 – Speer	Cam Henderson Center (4,336); Huntington, WV
January 22, 2026; 12:00 p.m., ESPN+		Louisiana–Monroe	W 115–60	13–7 (5–3)	17 – Dubinsky	9 – Fricks	7 – Joseph	Cam Henderson Center (3,312); Huntington, WV
January 28, 2026; 8:00 p.m., ESPN+		at Texas State	L 68–72	13–8 (5–4)	16 – Fricks	10 – Van Komen	3 – Speer	Strahan Arena (1,936); San Marcos, TX
January 31, 2026; 3:00 p.m., ESPN+		at Arkansas State	W 70–61	14–8 (6–4)	23 – Dubinsky	8 – Tied	8 – Speer	First National Bank Arena (3,932); Jonesboro, AR
February 4, 2026; 7:00 p.m., ESPN+		Southern Miss	W 81–77	15–8 (7–4)	25 – Fricks	7 – Fricks	8 – Speer	Cam Henderson Center (4,034); Huntington, WV
February 7, 2026*; 4:00 p.m., ESPN+		No. 23 Miami (OH); MAC–SBC Challenge	L 74–90	15–9	23 – Otshudi	10 – Fricks	3 – Tied	Cam Henderson Center (5,475); Huntington, WV
February 11, 2026; 7:30 p.m., ESPN+		at Old Dominion	W 81–79	16–9 (8–4)	24 – Fricks	13 – Fricks	10 – Speer	Chartway Arena (4,367); Norfolk, VA
February 14, 2026; 8:30 p.m., ESPNU		at Georgia Southern	L 87–101	16–10 (8–5)	20 – Speer	7 – Fuquay	6 – Speer	Hill Convocation Center (1,511); Statesboro, GA
February 16, 2026; 7:00 p.m., ESPN+		South Alabama	W 84–80	17–10 (9–5)	27 – Fricks	8 – Speer	7 – Tied	Cam Henderson Center (3,932); Huntington, WV
February 19, 2026; 6:30 p.m., ESPN+		at Appalachian State	W 94–93	18–10 (10–5)	24 – Tied	5 – Fuquay	4 – Joseph	Holmes Center (3,011); Boone, NC
February 21, 2026; 1:00 p.m., ESPN+		at Coastal Carolina	L 75–79	18–11 (10–6)	39 – Speer	9 – Hugie	2 – Tied	HTC Center (2,140); Conway, SC
February 24, 2026; 7:00 p.m., ESPN+		Old Dominion	W 97–88	19–11 (11–6)	28 – Fricks	6 – Harding	6 – Tied	Cam Henderson Center (4,156); Huntington, WV
February 27, 2026; 9:00 p.m., ESPN2		Georgia Southern	L 82–99	19–12 (11–7)	25 – Fricks	8 – Fricks	5 – Tied	Cam Henderson Center (5,167); Huntington, WV
Sun Belt Conference Tournament
March 8, 2026; 8:30 p.m., ESPN+	(2)	vs. (10) Georgia Southern; Semifinals	L 78–82	19–13	19 – Hugie	8 – Tied	5 – Speer	Pensacola Bay Center (2,103); Pensacola, FL
*Non-conference game. ^{#}Rankings from AP Poll. (#) Tournament seedings in parentheses. All times are in Eastern Time.
