= 2025–26 James Madison Dukes men's basketball team =

American college basketball season

2025–26 James Madison Dukes men's basketball
- Conference: Sun Belt Conference
- Record: 18–15 (9–9 Sun Belt)
- Head coach: Preston Spradlin (2nd season)
- Associate head coach: Dominic Lombardi
- Assistant coaches: Cason Burk; Dionte Ferguson; Calvin Baker; Brendan Foley
- Home arena: Atlantic Union Bank Center

2025–26 Sun Belt Conference men's basketball standings
	Conf.				Overall
Team	W		L	PCT	W		L	PCT
Troy †	12	–	6	.667	22	–	12	.647
Marshall	11	–	7	.611	19	–	13	.594
Coastal Carolina	11	–	7	.611	19	–	13	.594
Appalachian State	11	–	7	.611	19	–	13	.594
Texas State	11	–	7	.611	19	–	13	.594
South Alabama	11	–	7	.611	21	–	12	.636
Arkansas State	11	–	7	.611	20	–	12	.625
Southern Miss	9	–	9	.500	19	–	16	.543
James Madison	9	–	9	.500	18	–	15	.545
Georgia Southern	8	–	10	.444	21	–	16	.568
Old Dominion	7	–	11	.389	12	–	21	.364
Louisiana	7	–	11	.389	11	–	22	.333
Georgia State	7	–	11	.389	10	–	22	.313
Louisiana–Monroe	1	–	17	.056	4	–	28	.125
† 2026 Sun Belt tournament winner

The 2025–26 James Madison Dukes men's basketball team represented James Madison University during the 2025–26 NCAA Division I men's basketball season. The Dukes, led by second-year head coach Preston Spradlin, played their home games at the Atlantic Union Bank Center in Harrisonburg, Virginia as members of the Sun Belt Conference.

== Previous season ==
The Dukes finished the 2024–25 season 20–12, 13–5 in Sun Belt play, to finish in a four-way tie for first place. They were defeated by Troy in the semifinals of the Sun Belt tournament.

== Preseason ==
On October 20, 2025, the Sun Belt released their preseason poll. James Madison was picked to finish atop the conference, while receiving one first-place vote.

=== Preseason rankings ===
Sun Belt Preseason Poll
Place	Team	Points
1	James Madison	175 (1)
2	Arkansas State	154 (3)
3	South Alabama	152 (4)
4	Troy	148 (1)
5	Old Dominion	145 (2)
6	Marshall	128 (1)
7	Appalachian State	123 (1)
8	Texas State	106
9	Louisiana	95 (1)
10	Georgia Southern	66
11	Georgia State	59
12	Southern Miss	57
13	Coastal Carolina	43
14	Louisiana–Monroe	19
(#) first-place votes

=== Preseason All-Sun Belt Teams ===
Preseason All-Sun Belt Teams
Team	Player	Year	Position
First	Bradley Douglas	Graduate Student	Guard

== Roster ==
2025–26 James Madison Dukes men's basketball team
Players
Coaches

Pos.	#	Name	Height	Weight	Year	Previous school	Hometown
F	0	Christian Brown	6 ft 8 in (2.03 m)	236 lb (107 kg)	Fr	Franklin High School	Franklin, Tennessee
G	1	Paul Jones III	6 ft 4 in (1.93 m)	174 lb (79 kg)	So	Winthrop	Suffolk, Virginia
G	2	Bradley Douglas (5th)	6 ft 1 in (1.85 m)	193 lb (88 kg)	Sr	Georgia Southern	Eustis, Florida
F	3	Eddie Ricks III	6 ft 7 in (2.01 m)	215 lb (98 kg)	Jr	Morehead State	Clarksville, Tennessee
G	4	Chance Lundy	6 ft 0 in (1.83 m)	170 lb (77 kg)	Sr	Colgan High School	Woodbridge, Virginia
F	5	Justin Taylor	6 ft 6 in (1.98 m)	222 lb (101 kg)	Sr	Syracuse	Charlottesville, Virginia
G	10	Cliff Davis (5th)	6 ft 2 in (1.88 m)	194 lb (88 kg)	Sr	UT Rio Grande Valley	Thomasville, Georgia
G	11	Paul Lewis	6 ft 2 in (1.88 m)	175 lb (79 kg)	RS Jr	Vanderbilt	Woodbridge, Virginia
G	12	Kose Egbule	6 ft 2 in (1.88 m)	195 lb (88 kg)	RS Sr	Dickinson State	Houston, Texas
F	13	Preston Fowler	6 ft 8 in (2.03 m)	227 lb (103 kg)	Fr	Brewster Academy	Vernon, Connecticut
G	15	Josh Stephen	6 ft 0 in (1.83 m)	165 lb (75 kg)	Sr	Shenandoah	Virginia Beach, Virginia
F	21	Justin McBride	6 ft 7 in (2.01 m)	240 lb (109 kg)	Jr	Nevada	Plano, Texas
G	23	Ike Cornish	6 ft 6 in (1.98 m)	210 lb (95 kg)	Sr	Nicholls	Baltimore, Maryland
F	25	Eli Wilborn	6 ft 8 in (2.03 m)	252 lb (114 kg)	Jr	Duquesne	Middletown, Connecticut
F	33	Gabe Newhof	6 ft 9 in (2.06 m)	236 lb (107 kg)	Sr	Spring Arbor	Hudsonville, Michigan

Head coach

- Preston Spradlin (Alice Lloyd)

Assistant coach(es)

- Dominic Lombardi (Indiana (PA))
- Cason Burk (Jackson State)
- Dionte Ferguson (South Alabama)
- Calvin Baker (Virginia)
- Brendan Foley (Kansas State)

Legend

- (C) Team captain
- (S) Suspended
- (I) Ineligible
- (W) Walk-on
- (5th) Fifth-year senior
- Injured
- Current redshirt

Roster
Last update: November 5, 2025

== Schedule and results ==
Date time, TV	Rank^{#}	Opponent^{#}	Result	Record	High points	High rebounds	High assists	Site (attendance) city, state
Exhibition
October 25, 2025*; 6:00 pm		at Richmond	L 58–63	–	14 – McBride	15 – Ricks III	3 – Douglas	Robins Center (4,130); Richmond, VA
Regular season
November 3, 2025*; 7:00 pm, ESPN+		at Akron; MAC–SBC Challenge	L 71–85	0–1	14 – Tied	6 – Fowler	5 – Lewis	James A. Rhodes Arena (2,461); Akron, OH
November 5, 2025*; 7:00 pm, ESPN+		Washington and Lee	W 70–56	1–1	20 – Newhof	9 – Fowler	3 – Tied	Atlantic Union Bank Center (3,394); Harrisonburg, VA
November 9, 2025*; 1:00 pm, ESPN+		Coppin State	W 84–70	2–1	16 – Davis	6 – Fowler	4 – Tied	Atlantic Union Bank Center (2,665); Harrisonburg, VA
November 12, 2025*; 7:00 pm, ESPN+		at Longwood	L 72–82	2–2	22 – Douglas	12 – Ricks III	7 – Douglas	Joan Perry Brock Center (3,117); Farmville, VA
November 15, 2025*; 7:00 pm, NECFR		at LIU	L 79–88	2–3	16 – Douglas	8 – Ricks III	4 – Lewis	Steinberg Wellness Center (626); Brooklyn, NY
November 18, 2025*; 7:00 pm, ESPN+		Towson	W 81–75	3–3	22 – Douglas	11 – Ricks III	6 – Douglas	Atlantic Union Bank Center (3,072); Harrisonburg, VA
November 24, 2025*; 7:00 pm, ESPN+		at FIU; FIU MTE	W 80–72	4–3	26 – McBride	11 – Brown	5 – Douglas	Ocean Bank Convocation Center; Miami, FL
November 25, 2025*; 7:00 pm, ESPN+		vs. Omaha; FIU MTE	W 88–77	5–3	24 – McBride	5 – McBride	8 – Douglas	Ocean Bank Convocation Center (99); Miami, FL
November 29, 2025*; 2:00 pm, ESPN+		at George Mason	L 66–82	5–4	22 – Douglas	7 – Ricks III	5 – Douglas	EagleBank Arena (5,262); Fairfax, VA
December 3, 2025*; 7:00 pm, ESPN+		North Carolina Central	W 67–62	6–4	18 – Davis	7 – Ricks III	3 – Tied	Atlantic Union Bank Center (2,492); Harrisonburg, VA
December 6, 2025*; 2:00 pm, ESPN+		Norfolk State	W 68–67	7–4	33 – McBride	8 – McBride	6 – Douglas	Atlantic Union Bank Center (2,730); Harrisonburg, VA
December 17, 2025; 7:00 pm, ESPN+		at Old Dominion; Royal Rivalry	L 68–74	7–5 (0–1)	24 – McBride	7 – McBride	7 – Douglas	Chartway Arena (5,788); Norfolk, VA
December 20, 2025; 5:00 pm, ESPN+		at Georgia Southern	L 92–96 ^{OT}	7–6 (0–2)	27 – Douglas	10 – Ricks III	2 – McBride	Hill Convocation Center (1,265); Statesboro, GA
December 29, 2025*; 7:00 pm, SECN+		at No. 18 Arkansas	L 74–103	7–7	19 – Douglas	6 – Ricks III	4 – Douglas	Bud Walton Arena (19,200); Fayetteville, AR
January 3, 2026; 3:00 pm, ESPN+		at Arkansas State	W 78–74	8–7 (1–2)	24 – Davis	7 – McBride	4 – McBride	First National Bank Arena (4,017); Jonesboro, AR
January 7, 2026; 7:00 pm, ESPN+		Marshall	L 64–66	8–8 (1–3)	14 – McBride	8 – Fowler	4 – Douglas, Davis	Atlantic Union Bank Center (2,435); Harrisonburg, VA
January 10, 2026; 4:00 pm, ESPN+		Old Dominion; Royal Rivalry	W 70–69	9–8 (2–3)	29 – McBride	9 – Ricks III	6 – Douglas	Atlantic Union Bank Center (5,585); Harrisonburg, VA
January 15, 2026; 6:30 pm, ESPN+		at Appalachian State	L 65–80	9–9 (2–4)	15 – Davis	5 – McBride	4 – Douglas	Holmes Center (2,177); Boone, NC
January 17, 2026; 4:00 pm, ESPN+		at Marshall	L 72–77	9–10 (2–5)	20 – Davis	10 – Fowler	4 – Douglas	Cam Henderson Center (4,336); Huntington, WV
January 22, 2026; 7:00 pm, ESPN+		South Alabama	L 83–90	9–11 (2–6)	30 – McBride	12 – McBride	6 – Davis	Atlantic Union Bank Center (3,046); Harrisonburg, VA
January 24, 2026; 4:00 pm, ESPN+		Texas State	W 82–57	10–11 (3–6)	18 – Tied	9 – Brown	3 – Tied	Atlantic Union Bank Center (3,556); Harrisonburg, VA
January 29, 2026; 7:00 pm, ESPN+		at Troy	W 73–64	11–11 (4–6)	23 – Davis	13 – Brown	4 – Douglas	Trojan Arena (2,602); Troy, AL
January 31, 2026; 3:00 pm, ESPN+		at Southern Miss	L 65–73	11–12 (4–7)	18 – Tied	6 – Tied	2 – Douglas	Reed Green Coliseum (2,996); Hattiesburg, MS
February 4, 2026; 7:00 pm, ESPN+		Louisiana	L 61–64	11–13 (4–8)	12 – Davis	8 – Wilborn	4 – Egbule	Atlantic Union Bank Center (4,140); Harrisonburg, VA
February 7, 2026*; 4:00 pm, ESPN+		Toledo; MAC–SBC Challenge	W 73–71	12–13	18 – Davis	9 – Fowler	3 – Tied	Atlantic Union Bank Center (3,417); Harrisonburg, VA
February 12, 2026; 7:00 pm, ESPN+		Georgia State	W 81–79 ^{OT}	13–13 (5–8)	26 – Davis	9 – McBride	7 – Egbule	Atlantic Union Bank Center (2,947); Harrisonburg, VA
February 14, 2026; 4:00 pm, ESPN+		Appalachian State	W 69–58	14–13 (6–8)	21 – McBride	7 – McBride	5 – Davis	Atlantic Union Bank Center (4,528); Harrisonburg, VA
February 18, 2026; 7:00 pm, ESPN+		at Coastal Carolina	W 67–65	15–13 (7–8)	22 – Davis	6 – Davis	2 – McBide	HTC Center (2,203); Conway, SC
February 21, 2026; 4:00 pm, ESPN+		at Georgia State	W 80–65	16–13 (8–8)	27 – Davis	9 – Egbule	2 – Tied	GSU Convocation Center (1,396); Atlanta, GA
February 25, 2026; 8:00 pm, ESPN+		Georgia Southern	W 82–66	17–13 (9–8)	24 – Davis	11 – Fowler	5 – Ricks III	Atlantic Union Bank Center (3,136); Harrisonburg, VA
February 27, 2026; 8:00 pm, ESPN+		Coastal Carolina	L 68–69	17–14 (9–9)	25 – Davis	7 – McBride	3 – Egbule	Atlantic Union Bank Center (4,042); Harrisonburg, VA
Sun Belt tournament
March 4, 2026; 6:00 pm, ESPN+	(9)	vs. (12) Louisiana; Second round	W 87–72	18–14	21 – Davis	8 – McBride	3 – Tied	Pensacola Bay Center (824); Pensacola, FL
March 5, 2026; 6:00 pm, ESPN+	(9)	vs. (8) Southern Miss; Third round	L 80–86	18–15	19 – Davis	7 – McBride	4 – McBride	Pensacola Bay Center; Pensacola, FL
*Non-conference game. ^{#}Rankings from AP Poll. (#) Tournament seedings in parentheses. All times are in Eastern.
