= 2026 Sun Belt Conference men's basketball tournament =

American college basketball postseason tournament

- Classification: Division I
- Season: 2025–26
- Teams: 14
- Site: Pensacola Bay Center; Pensacola, Florida
- Champions: Troy (3rd title)
- Winning coach: Scott Cross (2nd title)
- MVP: Thomas Dowd (Troy)
- Television: ESPN2, ESPN+

2025–26 Sun Belt Conference men's basketball standings
	Conf.				Overall
Team	W		L	PCT	W		L	PCT
Troy †	12	–	6	.667	22	–	12	.647
Marshall	11	–	7	.611	19	–	13	.594
Coastal Carolina	11	–	7	.611	19	–	13	.594
Appalachian State	11	–	7	.611	19	–	13	.594
Texas State	11	–	7	.611	19	–	13	.594
South Alabama	11	–	7	.611	21	–	12	.636
Arkansas State	11	–	7	.611	20	–	12	.625
Southern Miss	9	–	9	.500	19	–	16	.543
James Madison	9	–	9	.500	18	–	15	.545
Georgia Southern	8	–	10	.444	21	–	16	.568
Old Dominion	7	–	11	.389	12	–	21	.364
Louisiana	7	–	11	.389	11	–	22	.333
Georgia State	7	–	11	.389	10	–	22	.313
Louisiana–Monroe	1	–	17	.056	4	–	28	.125
† 2026 Sun Belt tournament winner

The 2026 Sun Belt Conference men's basketball tournament was the postseason men's basketball tournament for Sun Belt Conference during the 2025–26 NCAA Division I men's basketball season. All tournament games were played at Pensacola Bay Center between March 3–9, 2026. The winner, Troy, received the conference's automatic bid to the 2026 NCAA tournament.

== Seeds ==
All fourteen conference teams will qualify for the tournament. Teams will be seeded by record within the conference, with a tiebreaker system to seed teams with identical conference records. The tournament will use a unique stepladder system giving the top two teams byes to the tournament semifinals and the No. 3 and No. 4 teams byes to the tournament quarterfinals. The top ten teams will receive at least one bye.

Seed	School	Conference record	Tiebreaker 1	Tiebreaker 2	Tiebreaker 3	Tiebreaker 4	Tiebreaker 5	Tiebreaker 6
1	Troy	12–6						
2	Marshall	11–7	3–0 vs. USM/JMU					
3	Coastal Carolina	11–7	2–1 vs. USM/JMU	2–0 vs. MRSH	1–0 vs. TXST			
4	Appalachian State	11–7	2–1 vs. USM/JMU	0–2 vs. MRSH		1–0 vs. Troy		
5	Texas State	11–7	1–2 vs. USM/JMU	1–0 vs. MRSH	0–1 vs. CCU	1–1 vs. Troy	1–0 vs. MRSH	
6	South Alabama	11–7	2–1 vs. USM/JMU	0–1 vs. MRSH		1–1 vs. Troy	0–1 vs. MRSH	2–0 vs. ARST
7	Arkansas State	11–7	2–1 vs. USM/JMU	0–1 vs. MRSH		1–1 vs. Troy	0–1 vs. MRSH	0–2 vs. USA
8	Southern Miss	9–9	1–0 vs. JMU					
9	James Madison	9–9	0–1 vs. USM					
10	Georgia Southern	8–10						
11	Old Dominion	7–11	3–0 vs. UL/GAST					
12	Louisiana	7–11	1–1 vs. ODU/GAST	1–0 vs. GAST				
13	Georgia State	7–11	0–3 vs. ODU/UL	0–1 vs. UL				
14	Louisiana–Monroe	1–17						

== Schedule ==
Game	Time	Matchup	Score	Attendance	Television
First round – Tuesday, March 3
1	5:00 p.m.	No. 12 Louisiana vs. No. 13 Georgia State	84–75	629	ESPN+
2	7:30 p.m.	No. 11 Old Dominion vs. No. 14 Louisiana–Monroe	87–80	719	ESPN+
Second round – Wednesday, March 4
3	5:00 p.m.	No. 9 James Madison vs. No. 12 Louisiana	87–72	824	ESPN+
4	7:30 p.m.	No. 10 Georgia Southern vs. No. 11 Old Dominion	88–84	931	ESPN+
Third round – Thursday, March 5
5	5:00 p.m.	No. 8 Southern Miss vs. No. 9 James Madison	86–80	1,081	ESPN+
6	7:30 p.m.	No. 7 Arkansas State vs. No. 10 Georgia Southern	77–80	1,374	ESPN+
Fourth round – Friday, March 6
7	5:00 p.m.	No. 5 Texas State vs. No. 8 Southern Miss	77–81	1,248	ESPN+
8	7:30 p.m.	No. 6 South Alabama vs. No. 10 Georgia Southern	85–94	1,867	ESPN+
Quarterfinals – Saturday, March 7
9	5:30 p.m.	No. 4 Appalachian State vs. No. 8 Southern Miss	73–86	1,534	ESPN+
10	8:00 p.m.	No. 3 Coastal Carolina vs. No. 10 Georgia Southern	72–96	1,685	ESPN+
Semifinals – Sunday, March 8
11	5:00 p.m.	No. 1 Troy vs. No. 8 Southern Miss	78–70	1,850	ESPN+
12	8:00 p.m.	No. 2 Marshall vs. No. 10 Georgia Southern	78–82	2,103	ESPN+
Final – Monday, March 9
13	6:00 p.m.	No. 1 Troy vs. No. 10 Georgia Southern	77–61	2,555	ESPN2
Game times in CT; ranking denotes tournament seed

== Bracket ==
First round Tuesday, March 3 ESPN+
12	Louisiana	84
13	Georgia State	75
11	Old Dominion	87
14	Louisiana–Monroe	80

Second round Wednesday, March 4 ESPN+
9	James Madison	87
12	Louisiana	72
10	Georgia Southern	88
11	Old Dominion	84

Third round Thursday, March 5 ESPN+
8	Southern Miss	86
9	James Madison	80
7	Arkansas State	77
10	Georgia Southern	80

Fourth round Friday, March 6 ESPN+
5	Texas State	77
8	Southern Miss	81
6	South Alabama	85
10	Georgia Southern	94

Quarterfinals; Saturday, March 7 ESPN+
4	Appalachian State	73
8	Southern Miss	86
3	Coastal Carolina	72
10	Georgia Southern	96

Semifinals; Sunday, March 8 ESPN+
1	Troy	78
8	Southern Miss	70
2	Marshall	78
10	Georgia Southern	82

Final; Monday, March 9 ESPN2
1	Troy	77
10	Georgia Southern	61

== Awards and honors ==
Tournament MVP: Thomas Dowd, Troy

SBC All-Tournament Team
- Thomas Dowd, Troy
- Jerrell Bellamy, Troy
- Alden Applewhite, Georgia Southern
- Tyren Moore, Georgia Southern
- Spudd Webb, Georgia Southern
- Tylik Weeks, Southern Miss

== See also ==
- 2026 Sun Belt Conference women's basketball tournament
