= 2025–26 Texas State Bobcats men's basketball team =

American college basketball season

2025–26 Texas State Bobcats men's basketball
- Conference: Sun Belt Conference
- Record: 19–13 (11–7 Sun Belt)
- Head coach: Terrence Johnson (6th season)
- Associate head coach: Bennie Seltzer
- Assistant coaches: Donte Mathis; Jay Smith; Dwight Thorne II
- Home arena: Strahan Arena

2025–26 Sun Belt Conference men's basketball standings
	Conf.				Overall
Team	W		L	PCT	W		L	PCT
Troy †	12	–	6	.667	22	–	11	.667
Marshall	11	–	7	.611	19	–	13	.594
Coastal Carolina	11	–	7	.611	19	–	13	.594
Appalachian State	11	–	7	.611	19	–	13	.594
Texas State	11	–	7	.611	19	–	13	.594
South Alabama	11	–	7	.611	21	–	11	.656
Arkansas State	11	–	7	.611	20	–	12	.625
Southern Miss	9	–	9	.500	19	–	16	.543
James Madison	9	–	9	.500	18	–	15	.545
Georgia Southern	8	–	10	.444	21	–	16	.568
Old Dominion	7	–	11	.389	12	–	21	.364
Louisiana	7	–	11	.389	11	–	22	.333
Georgia State	7	–	11	.389	10	–	22	.313
Louisiana–Monroe	1	–	17	.056	4	–	28	.125
† 2026 Sun Belt tournament winner As of March 9, 2026

The 2025–26 Texas State Bobcats men's basketball team represented Texas State University during the 2025–26 NCAA Division I men's basketball season. The Bobcats, led by sixth-year head coach Terrence Johnson, played their home games at Strahan Arena in San Marcos, Texas as members of the Sun Belt Conference.

== Previous season ==
The Bobcats finished the 2024–25 season 16–16, 9–9 in Sun Belt play, to finish in seventh place. They were defeated by Old Dominion in the third round of the Sun Belt tournament.

== Preseason ==
On October 20, 2025, the Sun Belt released their preseason poll. Texas State was picked to finish eighth in the conference.

=== Preseason rankings ===
Sun Belt Preseason Poll
Place	Team	Points
1	James Madison	175 (1)
2	Arkansas State	154 (3)
3	South Alabama	152 (4)
4	Troy	148 (1)
5	Old Dominion	145 (2)
6	Marshall	128 (1)
7	Appalachian State	123 (1)
8	Texas State	106
9	Louisiana	95 (1)
10	Georgia Southern	66
11	Georgia State	59
12	Southern Miss	57
13	Coastal Carolina	43
14	Louisiana–Monroe	19
(#) first-place votes

=== Preseason All-Sun Belt Teams ===
Preseason All-Sun Belt Teams
Team	Player	Year	Position
Second	Mark Drone	Senior	Guard
Third	Kaden Gumbs	Junior	Guard

== Roster ==
2025–26 Texas State Bobcats men's basketball team
Players
Coaches

Pos.	#	Name	Height	Weight	Year	Previous school	Hometown
F	0	DJ Hall	6 ft 7 in (2.01 m)	220 lb (100 kg)	Fr	Plano East High School	Plano, Texas
G	1	Ky Pernell	6 ft 3 in (1.91 m)	182 lb (83 kg)	Jr	Jones College	Moorhead, Mississippi
G	2	Franck Emmou	6 ft 5 in (1.96 m)	190 lb (86 kg)	RS So	UMBC	Arlington, Texas
C	3	Robert Fields	6 ft 9 in (2.06 m)	220 lb (100 kg)	Fr	McDonogh School	Baltimore, Maryland
G	4	Mark Drone	6 ft 0 in (1.83 m)	180 lb (82 kg)	Sr	Southwest Mississippi Community College	Jackson, Mississippi
G	5	Jalen Bolden	6 ft 5 in (1.96 m)	200 lb (91 kg)	Sr	Louisiana–Monroe	Zachary, Louisiana
G	6	Cameron Simpson	6 ft 7 in (2.01 m)	181 lb (82 kg)	RS Fr	UCF	Orlando, Florida
G	7	Dimp Pernell	6 ft 3 in (1.91 m)	180 lb (82 kg)	Jr	Jones College	Moorhead, Mississippi
G	9	Kyndall Davis (5th)	6 ft 5 in (1.96 m)	200 lb (91 kg)	Sr	Louisiana	Chicago, Illinois
G	10	Jaelyn Lee	6 ft 6 in (1.98 m)	200 lb (91 kg)	RS Jr	Texas A&M	Paris, Texas
G	11	Kaden Gumbs	6 ft 2 in (1.88 m)	179 lb (81 kg)	Jr	San Marcos High School	San Marcos, Texas
G	21	Deke Thompson	6 ft 4 in (1.93 m)	205 lb (93 kg)	Fr	Charles Page High School	Jenks, Oklahoma
C	22	Makai Willis	6 ft 8 in (2.03 m)	235 lb (107 kg)	Sr	Louisiana–Monroe	Tallahassee, Florida
F	23	Isaiah Barganier	6 ft 7 in (2.01 m)	250 lb (113 kg)	RS Jr	UT Rio Grande Valley	Fulshear, Texas
C	24	Tay Knox	6 ft 9 in (2.06 m)	2150 lb (975 kg)	Sr	Western Illinois	Troy, Alabama

Head coach

- Terrence Johnson (Southern)

Assistant coach(es)

- Bennie Seltzer (Washington State)
- Donte Mathis (Texas State)
- Jay Smith (LSU–Alexandria)
- Dwight Thorne II (Colorado)

Legend

- (C) Team captain
- (S) Suspended
- (I) Ineligible
- (W) Walk-on
- (5th) Fifth-year senior
- Injured
- Current redshirt

Roster
Last update: November 7, 2025

== Schedule and results ==
Date time, TV	Rank^{#}	Opponent^{#}	Result	Record	High points	High rebounds	High assists	Site (attendance) city, state
Exhibition
October 26, 2025*; 4:00 pm		Huston–Tillotson	W 102–52	–	15 – Emmou	6 – Tied	4 – Gumbs	Strahan Arena (1,155); San Marcos, TX
Regular season
November 3, 2025*; 6:00 pm, ESPN+		at Bowling Green; MAC–SBC Challenge	L 48–83	0–1	12 – Emmou	5 – Emmou	3 – D. Pernell	Stroh Center (3,003); Bowling Green, OH
November 5, 2025*; 7:00 pm, ESPN+		Texas A&M–San Antonio	W 114–55	1–1	19 – Drone	7 – Willis	8 – Gumbs	Strahan Arena; San Marcos, TX
November 8, 2025*; 1:00 pm, ESPN+		at Tulane	L 71–79	1–2	14 – Hall	7 – Hall	7 – Gumbs	Devlin Fieldhouse (1,059); New Orleans, LA
November 12, 2025*; 7:00 pm, ESPN+		UTSA; I-35 Rivalry	W 80–69	2–2	19 – D. Pernell	11 – Fields	7 – Gumbs	Strahan Arena (2,752); San Marcos, TX
November 15, 2025*; 4:00 pm, ESPN+		Texas Southern	W 77–67	3–2	19 – Drone	7 – Tied	3 – Tied	Strahan Arena (1,236); San Marcos, TX
November 18, 2025*; 7:00 pm, ESPN+		Abilene Christian	W 63–49	4–2	13 – D. Pernell	10 – Hall	2 – Tied	Strahan Arena (1,215); San Marcos, TX
November 21, 2025*; 7:00 pm, ESPN+		Little Rock	W 65–56	5–2	13 – Tied	8 – Davis	5 – D. Pernell	Strahan Arena (1,180); San Marcos, TX
November 24, 2025*; 6:00 pm, ESPN+		Texas Lutheran	W 93–41	6–2	24 – Bolden	8 – Bolden	6 – Gumbs	Strahan Arena (1,287); San Marcos, TX
November 28, 2025*; 1:00 pm, FloCollege		vs. Seattle; Resorts World Las Vegas Classic semifinals	L 52–66	6–3	10 – Drone	6 – Tied	3 – Tied	Resorts World Events Center; Winchester, NV
November 29, 2025*; 1:00 pm, FloCollege		vs. Lehigh; Resorts World Las Vegas Classic 3rd place game	L 74–78 ^{OT}	6–4	23 – Hall	12 – Hall	3 – Tied	Resorts World Events Center; Winchester, NV
December 3, 2025*; 8:00 pm, ESPN+		at Rice	L 72–77	6–5	23 – Drone	12 – Hall	3 – Tied	Tudor Fieldhouse (1,055); Houston, TX
December 10, 2025*; 7:30 pm, ESPN+		Southern	W 86–83	7–5	23 – Drone	8 – Davis	5 – Drone	Strahan Arena (1,428); San Marcos, TX
December 17, 2025; 7:30 pm, ESPN+		Arkansas State	L 70–89	7–6 (0–1)	15 – Hall	7 – Hall	6 – Gumbs	Strahan Arena (1,203); San Marcos, TX
December 20, 2025; 2:30 pm, ESPN+		South Alabama	W 67–65	8–6 (1–1)	15 – Hall	9 – Tied	3 – Tied	Strahan Arena (1,224); San Marcos, TX
December 31, 2025; 1:00 pm, ESPN+		at Troy	L 80–100	8–7 (1–2)	22 – Hall	9 – Hall	8 – Drone	Trojan Arena (2,570); Troy, AL
January 3, 2026; 2:30 pm, ESPN+		at Louisiana–Monroe	W 84–79	9–7 (2–2)	24 – Drone	7 – Hall	7 – Gumbs	Fant–Ewing Coliseum (1,412); Monroe, LA
January 8, 2026; 7:00 pm, ESPN+		at Southern Miss	L 70–80 ^{OT}	9–8 (2–3)	18 – Drone	8 – Tied	2 – Tied	Reed Green Coliseum (2,357); Hattiesburg, MS
January 10, 2026; 2:00 pm, ESPN+		at Arkansas State	L 82–83	9–9 (2–4)	16 – Hall	12 – Hall	4 – Emmou	First National Bank Arena (4,059); Jonesboro, AR
January 14, 2026; 7:00 pm, ESPN+		Louisiana	W 59–54	10–9 (3–4)	18 – Gumbs	14 – Hall	4 – Lee	Strahan Arena (1,103); San Marcos, TX
January 17, 2026; 3:30 pm, ESPN+		Southern Miss	W 74–67	11–9 (4–4)	18 – Gumbs	8 – Gumbs	3 – Gumbs	Strahan Arena (1,563); San Marcos, TX
January 22, 2026; 6:00 pm, ESPN+		at Coastal Carolina	L 70–72	11–10 (4–5)	24 – Drone	7 – Hall	2 – Tied	HTC Center (2,126); Conway, SC
January 24, 2026; 2:00 pm, ESPN+		at James Madison	L 57–82	11–11 (4–6)	17 – Drone	6 – Fields	4 – Gumbs	Atlantic Union Bank Center (3,556); Harrisonburg, VA
January 28, 2026; 7:00 pm, ESPN+		Marshall	W 72–68	12–11 (5–6)	17 – Drone	9 – Davis	4 – Davis	Strahan Arena (1,936); San Marcos, TX
January 31, 2026; 1:00 pm, ESPN+		Old Dominion	W 81–64	13–11 (6–6)	24 – Hall	7 – Tied	8 – Drone	Strahan Arena (1,667); San Marcos, TX
February 4, 2026; 6:00 pm, ESPN+		at Georgia Southern	W 77–71	14–11 (7–6)	16 – Hall	10 – Hall	7 – Drone	Hill Convocation Center (1,505); Statesboro, GA
February 7, 2026*; 2:00 pm, ESPN+		Western Michigan; MAC–SBC Challenge	W 77–61	15–11	20 – Drone	6 – Tied	3 – Tied	Strahan Arena (2,774); San Marcos, TX
February 11, 2026; 7:00 pm, ESPN+		Troy	W 74–62	16–11 (8–6)	21 – Hall	6 – Tied	4 – Gumbs	Strahan Arena (2,741); San Marcos, TX
February 14, 2026; 2:00 pm, ESPN+		Louisiana–Monroe	W 95−84	17−11 (9−6)	27 – Hall	9 – Hall	5 – Tied	Strahan Arena (1,378); San Marcos, TX
February 19, 2026; 7:00 pm, ESPN+		at South Alabama	W 90–82 ^{OT}	18–11 (10–6)	24 – Hall	8 – Tied	8 – Drone	Mitchell Center; Mobile, AL
February 21, 2026; 12:00 pm, ESPN+		at Louisiana	L 54–67	18–12 (10–7)	18 – Hall	6 – Hall	3 – Drone	Cajundome (2,484); Lafayette, LA
February 27, 2026; 7:00 pm, ESPN+		Appalachian State	W 60–57	19–12 (11–7)	23 – Drone	11 – Hall	4 – Drone	Strahan Arena (4,054); San Marcos, TX
Sun Belt tournament
March 6, 2026; 5:00 p.m., ESPN+	(5)	vs. (8) Southern Miss; Fourth round	L 77–81	19–13	25 – Hall	11 – Hall	4 – Emmou	Pensacola Bay Center (1,248); Pensacola, FL
*Non-conference game. ^{#}Rankings from AP Poll. (#) Tournament seedings in parentheses. All times are in Central.
