= 2025–26 Louisiana–Monroe Warhawks men's basketball team =

American college basketball season

2025–26 Louisiana–Monroe Warhawks men's basketball
- Conference: Sun Belt Conference
- Record: 4–28 (1–17 Sun Belt)
- Head coach: Phil Cunningham (1st season)
- Associate head coach: Derrick Zimmerman
- Assistant coaches: Franklin Miskelly; Christopher Woodall; Reid Roberts; Noah Stansbury
- Home arena: Fant–Ewing Coliseum

2025–26 Sun Belt Conference men's basketball standings
	Conf.				Overall
Team	W		L	PCT	W		L	PCT
Troy	12	–	6	.667	20	–	11	.645
Marshall	11	–	7	.611	19	–	12	.613
Coastal Carolina	11	–	7	.611	19	–	12	.613
Appalachian State	11	–	7	.611	19	–	12	.613
Texas State	11	–	7	.611	19	–	12	.613
South Alabama	11	–	7	.611	21	–	10	.677
Arkansas State	11	–	7	.611	20	–	11	.645
Southern Miss	9	–	9	.500	16	–	15	.516
James Madison	9	–	9	.500	17	–	14	.548
Georgia Southern	8	–	10	.444	16	–	15	.516
Old Dominion	7	–	11	.389	11	–	20	.355
Louisiana	7	–	11	.389	10	–	21	.323
Georgia State	7	–	11	.389	10	–	21	.323
Louisiana–Monroe	1	–	17	.056	4	–	27	.129
† 2026 Sun Belt tournament winner As of February 27, 2026

The 2025–26 Louisiana–Monroe Warhawks men's basketball team represented the University of Louisiana at Monroe during the 2025–26 NCAA Division I men's basketball season. The Warhawks, led by first-year head coach Phil Cunningham, played their home games at Fant–Ewing Coliseum in Monroe, Louisiana, as members of the Sun Belt Conference.

== Previous season ==
The Warhawks finished the 2024–25 season 7–25, 3–15 Sun Belt play, to finish in a tie for 13th (last) place. They were defeated by Louisiana in the first round of the Sun Belt tournament.

During the season, on December 20, 2024, head coach Keith Richard announced that he would be retiring, effective at the end of the season, after 15 seasons at the helm. On March 18, 2025, the school announced that they would be naming assistant coach Phil Cunningham as Richard's successor.

== Preseason ==
On October 20, 2025, the Sun Belt released their preseason poll. Louisiana–Monroe was picked to finish last in the conference.

=== Preseason rankings ===
Sun Belt Preseason Poll
Place	Team	Points
1	James Madison	175 (1)
2	Arkansas State	154 (3)
3	South Alabama	152 (4)
4	Troy	148 (1)
5	Old Dominion	145 (2)
6	Marshall	128 (1)
7	Appalachian State	123 (1)
8	Texas State	106
9	Louisiana	95 (1)
10	Georgia Southern	66
11	Georgia State	59
12	Southern Miss	57
13	Coastal Carolina	43
14	Louisiana–Monroe	19
(#) first-place votes

=== Preseason All-Sun Belt Teams ===
No players were named to the First, Second or Third All-Sun Belt Teams.

== Roster ==
2025–26 Louisiana–Monroe Warhawks men's basketball team
Players
Coaches

Pos.	#	Name	Height	Weight	Year	Previous school	Hometown
G	0	Dylan Diaz	6 ft 2 in (1.88 m)	170 lb (77 kg)	Jr	Daytona State College	Clermont, Florida
F	1	Przemek Hartman	6 ft 9 in (2.06 m)	216 lb (98 kg)	Fr	ORPEG	Gdańsk, Poland
G	2	Micah Caster	6 ft 2 in (1.88 m)	180 lb (82 kg)	So	Jackson High School	McIntosh, Alabama
G	3	Krystian Lewis	6 ft 3 in (1.91 m)	185 lb (84 kg)	So	Pearl River Community College	Monroe, Louisiana
G/F	4	Lavell Brodnex	6 ft 5 in (1.96 m)	190 lb (86 kg)	Sr	Cameron	Saginaw, Michigan
F	5	Renars Sondors	6 ft 9 in (2.06 m)	215 lb (98 kg)	So	Marupe SC	Riga, Latvia
G	6	Ajay Tew	5 ft 11 in (1.8 m)	175 lb (79 kg)	Jr	Jonesboro-Hodge High School	Jonesboro, Louisiana
G	8	Alex Molofeev	6 ft 5 in (1.96 m)	205 lb (93 kg)	Fr	Znaika	Moscow, Russia
F/C	9	Brentay Noel	6 ft 10 in (2.08 m)	220 lb (100 kg)	Jr	Southern	Baton Rouge, Louisiana
G	11	Wiggy Ball	6 ft 3 in (1.91 m)	180 lb (82 kg)	Fr	Hartfield Academy	Flowood, Mississippi
G/F	12	Alex Huguet Carrasco	6 ft 7 in (2.01 m)	185 lb (84 kg)	Fr	Universitat Oberta de Catalunya	Palma de Mallorca, Spain
G	21	MJ Russell	6 ft 3 in (1.91 m)	195 lb (88 kg)	RS Jr	Mississippi State	Coker, Alabama
G	32	Cam Campbell	6 ft 3 in (1.91 m)	195 lb (88 kg)	RS So	Asbury	Brownsville, Kentucky

Head coach

- Phil Cunningham (Campbellsville)

Assistant coach(es)

- Derrick Zimmerman (Mississippi State)
- Franklin Miskelly (Mississippi State)
- Christopher Woodall (William Carey)
- Reid Roberts (FIU)
- Noah Stansbury (Memphis)

Legend

- (C) Team captain
- (S) Suspended
- (I) Ineligible
- (W) Walk-on
- Injured
- Current redshirt

Roster
Last update: November 9, 2025

== Schedule and results ==
Date time, TV	Rank^{#}	Opponent^{#}	Result	Record	High points	High rebounds	High assists	Site (attendance) city, state
Regular season
November 3, 2025*; 7:00 pm, ESPN+		at Northern Illinois; MAC–SBC Challenge	L 82–102	0–1	22 – Lewis	5 – Hartman	5 – Lewis	Convocation Center (1,071); DeKalb, IL
November 7, 2025*; 6:30 pm, SECN+		at Ole Miss	L 65–86	0–2	17 – Lewis	5 – Diaz	3 – Tied	SJB Pavilion (8,212); Oxford, MS
November 10, 2025*; 6:30 pm, ESPN+		Rust	W 88–55	1–2	20 – Russell	8 – Huguet Carrasco	6 – Lewis	Fant–Ewing Coliseum (989); Monroe, LA
November 13, 2025*; 7:00 pm, ESPN+		at Houston Christian	L 61–72	1–3	15 – Russell	8 – Lewis	5 – Lewis	Sharp Gymnasium (200); Houston, TX
November 17, 2025*; 6:30 pm, ESPN+		Lamar	L 66–79	1–4	24 – Russell	7 – Brodnex	4 – Molofeev	Fant–Ewing Coliseum (1,002); Monroe, LA
November 22, 2025*; 5:00 pm		vs. Morehead State; ETSU MTE	L 80–83	1–5	24 – Russell	12 – Brodnex	4 – Tied	Freedom Hall Civic Center (57); Johnson City, TN
November 23, 2025*; 3:00 pm, ESPN+		at East Tennessee State; ETSU MTE	L 55–97	1–6	15 – Sondors	5 – Brodnex	4 – Ball	Freedom Hall Civic Center (2,267); Johnson City, TN
December 3, 2025*; 6:30 pm, ESPN+		Mississippi Valley State	W 66–52	2–6	22 – Lewis	9 – Brodnex	3 – Tied	Fant–Ewing Coliseum (938); Monroe, LA
December 7, 2025*; 2:00 pm, ESPN+		at Stephen F. Austin	L 76–96	2–7	23 – Brodnex	11 – Brodnex	4 – Russell	William R. Johnson Coliseum (982); Nacogdoches, TX
December 9, 2025*; 12:00 pm, ESPN+		Arkansas Baptist	W 79–69	3–7	22 – Brodnex	18 – Brodnex	4 – Brodnex	Fant–Ewing Coliseum (7,341); Monroe, LA
December 13, 2025*; 11:00 am, ACCNX		at Miami (FL)	L 79–104	3–8	18 – Russell	13 – Brodnex	4 – Tied	Watsco Center (3,751); Coral Gables, FL
December 17, 2025; 6:30 pm, ESPN+		South Alabama	L 92–96 ^{2OT}	3–9 (0–1)	29 – Lewis	12 – Brodnex	7 – Russell	Fant–Ewing Coliseum (1,215); Monroe, LA
December 20, 2025; 2:00 pm, ESPN+		Louisiana	L 62–76	3–10 (0–2)	16 – Lewis	9 – Brodnex	5 – Brodnex	Fant–Ewing Coliseum (1,347); Monroe, LA
December 28, 2025*; 1:00 pm, ESPN+		at Kansas State	L 85–94	3–11	25 – Lewis	8 – Brodnex	4 – Diaz	Bramlage Coliseum (8,163); Manhattan, KS
January 1, 2026; 4:00 pm, ESPN+		Southern Miss	L 73–87	3–12 (0–3)	20 – Brodnex	5 – Brodnex	5 – Ball	Fant–Ewing Coliseum (1,298); Monroe, LA
January 3, 2026; 2:30 pm, ESPN+		Texas State	L 79–84	3–13 (0–4)	23 – Brodnex	7 – Brodnex	6 – Lewis	Fant–Ewing Coliseum (1,412); Monroe, LA
January 8, 2026; 7:30 pm, ESPN+		at Louisiana	L 79–85	3–14 (0–5)	25 – Lewis	7 – Lewis	3 – Lewis	Cajundome (2,341); Lafayette, LA
January 10, 2026; 2:00 pm, ESPN+		at Southern Miss	L 60–70	3–15 (0–6)	20 – Lewis	10 – Lewis	4 – Lewis	Reed Green Coliseum (2,840); Hattiesburg, MS
January 17, 2026; 2:30 pm, ESPN+		Georgia State	L 57–77	3–16 (0–7)	18 – Sondors	9 – Brodnex	3 – Brodnex	Fant–Ewing Coliseum (1,402); Monroe, LA
January 22, 2026; 11:00 am, ESPN+		at Marshall	L 60–115	3–17 (0–8)	16 – Sondors	5 – Sondors	3 – Lewis	Cam Henderson Center (3,312); Huntington, WV
January 23, 2026; 11:00 am, ESPN+		at Appalachian State	L 43–59	3–18 (0–9)	21 – Russell	9 – Lewis	2 – Lewis	Holmes Center (805); Boone, NC
January 30, 2026; 2:00 pm, ESPN+		Georgia Southern	L 76–79	3–19 (0–10)	21 – Lewis	14 – Sondors	4 – Lewis	Fredrick C. Hobdy Assembly Center; Grambling, LA
February 1, 2026; 1:00 pm, ESPN+		Coastal Carolina	L 79–83	3–20 (0–11)	20 – Lewis	10 – Brodnex	4 – Brodnex	Fant–Ewing Coliseum (984); Monroe, LA
February 4, 2026; 6:00 pm, ESPN+		at Old Dominion	W 85–79	4–20 (1–11)	28 – Lewis	10 – Brodnex	6 – Lewis	Chartway Arena (4,311); Norfolk, VA
February 7, 2026*; 2:00 pm, ESPN+		Ball State; MAC–SBC Challenge	L 68–73	4–21	26 – Lewis	13 – Brodnex	3 – Tied	Fant–Ewing Coliseum (1,521); Monroe, LA
February 11, 2026; 7:00 pm, ESPN+		at Arkansas State	L 70–103	4–22 (1–12)	32 – Lewis	7 – Brodnex	3 – Russell	First National Bank Arena (3,286); Jonesboro, AR
February 14, 2026; 2:00 pm, ESPN+		at Texas State	L 84−95	4−23 (1−13)	31 – Brodnex	5 – Bamisile	4 – Lewis	Strahan Arena (1,378); San Marcos, TX
February 18, 2026; 6:30 pm, ESPN+		Troy	L 76–77	4−24 (1−14)	19 – Lewis	7 – Molofeev	6 – Lewis	Fant–Ewing Coliseum (1,621); Monroe, LA
February 21, 2026; 2:00 pm, ESPN+		Arkansas State	L 94–102	4–25 (1–15)	33 – Lewis	10 – Brodnex	9 – Lewis	Fant–Ewing Coliseum (1,606); Monroe, LA
February 25, 2026; 7:30 pm, ESPN+		at South Alabama	L 54–89	4–26 (1–16)	20 – Lewis	7 – Lewis	5 – Molofeev	Mitchell Center (1,991); Mobile, AL
February 27, 2026; 6:00 pm, ESPN+		at Troy	L 65–80	4–27 (1–17)	20 – Brodnex	9 – Brodnex	3 – Lewis	Trojan Arena; Troy, AL
Sun Belt tournament
March 3, 2026; 7:30 pm, ESPN+	(14)	vs. (11) Old Dominion; First round	L 80–87	4–28	27 – Lewis	15 – Brodnex	3 – Brodnex	Pensacola Bay Center (719); Pensacola, FL
*Non-conference game. ^{#}Rankings from AP Poll. (#) Tournament seedings in parentheses. All times are in Central.
