= 2025–26 Southern Miss Golden Eagles basketball team =

American college basketball season

2025–26 Southern Miss Golden Eagles basketball

Pensacola Invitational champions
- Conference: Sun Belt Conference
- Record: 19–16 (9–9 Sun Belt)
- Head coach: Jay Ladner (7th season)
- Associate head coach: Win Case
- Assistant coaches: Luke Adams; Noah Croak; Bryce Garris; Scott Moses
- Home arena: Reed Green Coliseum

2025–26 Sun Belt Conference men's basketball standings
	Conf.				Overall
Team	W		L	PCT	W		L	PCT
Troy	12	–	6	.667	21	–	11	.656
Marshall	11	–	7	.611	19	–	13	.594
Coastal Carolina	11	–	7	.611	19	–	13	.594
Appalachian State	11	–	7	.611	19	–	13	.594
Texas State	11	–	7	.611	19	–	13	.594
South Alabama	11	–	7	.611	21	–	11	.656
Arkansas State	11	–	7	.611	20	–	12	.625
Southern Miss	9	–	9	.500	19	–	16	.543
James Madison	9	–	9	.500	18	–	15	.545
Georgia Southern	8	–	10	.444	21	–	15	.583
Old Dominion	7	–	11	.389	12	–	21	.364
Louisiana	7	–	11	.389	11	–	22	.333
Georgia State	7	–	11	.389	10	–	22	.313
Louisiana–Monroe	1	–	17	.056	4	–	28	.125
† 2026 Sun Belt tournament winner As of March 8, 2026

The 2025–26 Southern Miss Golden Eagles basketball team represented the University of Southern Mississippi during the 2025–26 NCAA Division I men's basketball season. The Golden Eagles, led by seventh-year head coach Jay Ladner, played their home games at Reed Green Coliseum in Hattiesburg, Mississippi as members of the Sun Belt Conference.

== Previous season ==
The Golden Eagles finished the 2024–25 season 11–22, 5–13 in Sun Belt play, to finish in 12th place. They defeated Coastal Carolina, before falling to Georgia Southern in the second round of the Sun Belt tournament.

== Preseason ==
On October 20, 2025, the Sun Belt released their preseason poll. Southern Miss was picked to finish 12th in the conference.

=== Preseason rankings ===
Sun Belt Preseason Poll
Place	Team	Points
1	James Madison	175 (1)
2	Arkansas State	154 (3)
3	South Alabama	152 (4)
4	Troy	148 (1)
5	Old Dominion	145 (2)
6	Marshall	128 (1)
7	Appalachian State	123 (1)
8	Texas State	106
9	Louisiana	95 (1)
10	Georgia Southern	66
11	Georgia State	59
12	Southern Miss	57
13	Coastal Carolina	43
14	Louisiana–Monroe	19
(#) first-place votes

=== Preseason All-Sun Belt Teams ===
No players were named to the First, Second or Third All-Sun Belt Teams.

== Roster ==
2025–26 Southern Miss Golden Eagles men's basketball team
Players
Coaches

Pos.	#	Name	Height	Weight	Year	Previous school	Hometown
G	0	Israel 'Izzy' Hart	6 ft 3 in (1.91 m)	164 lb (74 kg)	RS Sr	Central Oklahoma	Midwest City, Oklahoma
G	1	Curt Lewis	6 ft 5 in (1.96 m)	218 lb (99 kg)	GS	East Tennessee State	Louisville, Kentucky
G	2	Brewer Carruth	6 ft 4 in (1.93 m)	195 lb (88 kg)	So	Parklane Academy	Lake Dixie Springs, Mississippi
G	3	Chiante' Tramble	6 ft 2 in (1.88 m)	199 lb (90 kg)	So	Independence Community College	Edmond, Oklahoma
F	4	Tylik Weeks	6 ft 7 in (2.01 m)	225 lb (102 kg)	Jr	Southwest Mississippi Community College	New York, New York
G	5	Jett Montgomery	5 ft 11 in (1.8 m)	190 lb (86 kg)	So	Independence High School	Franklin, Tennessee
G	6	Robert Cowherd	6 ft 5 in (1.96 m)	213 lb (97 kg)	RS Jr	Ole Miss	Grayson, Georgia
C	7	Fallou Diagne	6 ft 11 in (2.11 m)	214 lb (97 kg)	RS Sr	Western Kentucky	Dakar, Senegal
G	8	Chandler Watts	6 ft 6 in (1.98 m)	201 lb (91 kg)	So	Eastern Florida State College	Clermont, Florida
G	9	Dalyn Brandon	6 ft 5 in (1.96 m)	190 lb (86 kg)	GS	Winston-Salem State	Baltimore, Maryland
G	10	Isaac Taveras	6 ft 6 in (1.98 m)	185 lb (84 kg)	Jr	South Plains College	Santo Domingo, Dominican Republic
F	11	EJ Paymon	6 ft 9 in (2.06 m)	243 lb (110 kg)	RS Fr	Mississippi State	Raymond, Mississippi
G	12	Felipe Patino	6 ft 4 in (1.93 m)	190 lb (86 kg)	So	Eastern Florida State College	Mississauga, Ontario
G	13	Dylan Brumfield	6 ft 5 in (1.96 m)	189 lb (86 kg)	Sr	William Carey	Hattiesburg, Mississippi
G	14	Blake Lander	6 ft 5 in (1.96 m)	205 lb (93 kg)	Sr	LIU	Beverly Hills, California
F	15	Djahi Binet	6 ft 7 in (2.01 m)	215 lb (98 kg)	GS	Alcorn State	Nice, France
F	21	IJ Ezuma	6 ft 8 in (2.03 m)	239 lb (108 kg)	RS Jr	South Plains College	Raleigh, North Carolina
C	22	Tegra Izay	7 ft 0 in (2.13 m)	269 lb (122 kg)	GS	Harcum College	Montreal, Quebec

Head coach

- Jay Ladner (Southern Miss)

Assistant coach(es)

- Win Case (USAO)
- Luke Adams (Texas Tech)
- Noah Croak (Indiana)
- Bryce Garris (Indiana)
- Scott Moses (UMass)

Legend

- (C) Team captain
- (S) Suspended
- (I) Ineligible
- (W) Walk-on
- Injured
- Current redshirt

Roster
Last update: November 9, 2025

== Schedule and results ==
Date time, TV	Rank^{#}	Opponent^{#}	Result	Record	High points	High rebounds	High assists	Site (attendance) city, state
Exhibition
October 20, 2025*; 6:00 pm		Houston Christian	L 64–69	–	23 – Taveras	7 – Taveras	4 – Brumfield	Reed Green Coliseum; Hattiesburg, MS
October 27, 2025*; 8:00 pm		at Jackson State	W 81–71	–	20 – Taveras	–	–	Williams Assembly Center; Jackson, MS
Regular season
November 3, 2025*; 5:30 pm, ESPN+		at Buffalo; MAC–SBC Challenge	L 79–85	0–1	28 – Taveras	6 – Tied	5 – Weeks	Alumni Arena (1,631); Amherst, NY
November 6, 2025*; 7:00 pm, ESPN+		Tougaloo	W 93–57	1–1	18 – Patino	10 – Taveras	4 – Brumfield	Reed Green Coliseum (2,176); Hattiesburg, MS
November 9, 2025*; 5:30 pm, SECN		at South Carolina	L 79–83 ^{OT}	1–2	25 – Taveras	8 – Taveras	4 – Hart	Colonial Life Arena (11,420); Columbia, SC
November 13, 2025*; 6:30 pm, SWACTV		at Grambling State	L 70–75	1–3	19 – Tied	9 – Taveras	3 – Tied	Fredrick C. Hobdy Assembly Center (1,578); Grambling, LA
November 18, 2025*; 7:30 pm, ESPN+		William Carey	W 82–59	2–3	13 – Taveras	8 – Tied	5 – Brumfield	Reed Green Coliseum (3,553); Hattiesburg, MS
November 22, 2025*; 7:00 pm, YouTube		vs. North Florida; Pensacola Invitational semifinals	W 92–83	3–3	37 – Weeks	8 – Taveras	7 – Brumfield	Pensacola Bay Center (874); Pensacola, FL
November 23, 2025*; 4:30 pm, YouTube		vs. UT Martin; Pensacola Invitational Championship Game	W 70–60	4–3	14 – Tied	7 – Weeks	3 – Tied	Pensacola Bay Center (932); Pensacola, FL
December 3, 2025*; 6:00 pm, ESPN+		at Radford	W 82–75	5–3	18 – Tied	13 – Binet	3 – Taveras	Dedmon Center (1,788); Radford, VA
December 6, 2025*; 11:00 am, ACCN		at Miami (FL)	L 64–88	5–4	12 – Tied	9 – Binet	5 – Tied	Watsco Center (3,907); Coral Gables, FL
December 8, 2025*; 7:00 pm, ESPN+		Grambling State	W 68–60	6–4	19 – Weeks	8 – Taveras	5 – Taveras	Reed Green Coliseum (2,347); Hattiesburg, MS
December 13, 2025*; 2:00 pm, SECN+		vs. Ole Miss; Mississippi Coast Coliseum Classic	L 67–71	6–5	20 – Taveras	10 – Weeks	4 – Weeks	Mississippi Coast Coliseum; Biloxi, MS
December 18, 2025; 7:30 pm, ESPN+		Louisiana	W 62–54	7–5 (1–0)	17 – Hart	8 – Tied	4 – Brumfield	Reed Green Coliseum (2,606); Hattiesburg, MS
December 20, 2025; 3:30 pm, ESPN+		Arkansas State	L 86–93	7–6 (1–1)	25 – Weeks	6 – Tied	3 – Tied	Reed Green Coliseum (2,827); Hattiesburg, MS
December 29, 2025*; 7:00 pm, SECN+		at LSU	L 62–90	7–7	12 – Weeks	4 – Tied	4 – Lewis	Pete Maravich Assembly Center (7,995); Baton Rouge, LA
January 1, 2026; 4:00 pm, ESPN+		at Louisiana–Monroe	W 87–73	8–7 (2–1)	24 – Weeks	14 – Binet	5 – Tied	Fant–Ewing Coliseum (1,298); Monroe, LA
January 3, 2026; 12:00 pm, ESPN+		at Louisiana	W 74–67	9–7 (3–1)	24 – Binet	8 – Binet	4 – Tied	Cajundome (2,434); Lafayette, LA
January 8, 2026; 7:00 pm, ESPN+		Texas State	W 80–70	10–7 (4–1)	25 – Weeks	15 – Binet	4 – Weeks	Reed Green Coliseum (2,357); Hattiesburg, MS
January 10, 2026; 2:00 pm, ESPN+		Louisiana–Monroe	W 70–60	11–7 (5–1)	20 – Weeks	11 – Binet	3 – Tied	Reed Green Coliseum (2,840); Hattiesburg, MS
January 14, 2026; 6:00 pm, ESPN+		at Troy	L 65–91	11–8 (5–2)	12 – Hart	11 – Binet	2 – Brumfield	Trojan Arena (2,946); Troy, AL
January 17, 2026; 3:30 pm, ESPN+		at Texas State	L 67–74	11–9 (5–3)	24 – Weeks	5 – Brumfield	2 – Brumfield	Strahan Arena (1,563); San Marcos, TX
January 22, 2026; 6:00 pm, ESPN+		at Georgia State	L 62–69	11–10 (5–4)	13 – Brumfield	9 – Binet	5 – Brumfield	GSU Convocation Center (1,478); Atlanta, GA
January 24, 2026; 12:00 pm, ESPN+		at Coastal Carolina	L 67–85	11–11 (5–5)	22 – Weeks	6 – Brumfield	2 – Tied	HTC Center (1,763); Conway, SC
January 29, 2026; 7:00 pm, ESPN+		Appalachian State	L 63–70	11–12 (5–6)	21 – Weeks	12 – Binet	3 – Weeks	Reed Green Coliseum (3,164); Hattiesburg, MS
January 31, 2026; 2:00 pm, ESPN+		James Madison	W 73–65	12–12 (6–6)	28 – Weeks	7 – Binet	3 – Weeks	Reed Green Coliseum (2,996); Hattiesburg, MS
February 4, 2026; 6:00 pm, ESPN+		at Marshall	L 77–81	12–13 (6–7)	31 – Binet	15 – Binet	4 – Brumfield	Cam Henderson Center (4,034); Huntington, WV
February 7, 2026*; 2:00 pm, ESPN+		Kent State; MAC–SBC Challenge	W 66–65	13–13	17 – Binet	11 – Weeks	2 – Tied	Reed Green Coliseum (2,734); Hattiesburg, MS
February 12, 2026; 7:30 pm, ESPN+		South Alabama	L 78–84	13–14 (6–8)	25 – Weeks	12 – Binet	7 – Weeks	Reed Green Coliseum (2,846); Hattiesburg, MS
February 14, 2026; 7:30 pm, ESPN+		Troy	W 69–65	14–14 (7–8)	32 – Weeks	18 – Binet	5 – Brumfield	Reed Green Coliseum (2,821); Hattiesburg, MS
February 21, 2026; 2:00 pm, ESPN+		Old Dominion	W 86–81	15–14 (8–8)	27 – Weeks	9 – Binet	4 – Tied	Reed Green Coliseum (2,747); Hattiesburg, MS
February 24, 2026; 7:30 pm, ESPN+		at Arkansas State	L 84–89	15–15 (8–9)	21 – Weeks	8 – Brumfield	9 – Weeks	First National Bank Arena (4,875); Jonesboro, AR
February 27, 2026; 7:30 pm, ESPN+		at South Alabama	W 68–55	16–15 (9–9)	19 – Weeks	12 – Binet	5 – Weeks	Mitchell Center (3,678); Mobile, AL
Sun Belt tournament
March 5, 2026; 5:00 pm, ESPN+	(8)	vs. (9) James Madison; Third round	W 86–80	17–15	31 – Weeks	8 – Taveras	4 – Brumfield	Pensacola Bay Center (1,081); Pensacola, FL
March 6, 2026; 5:00 pm, ESPN+	(8)	vs. (5) Texas State; Fourth round	W 81–77	18–15	32 – Weeks	7 – Binet	2 – Tied	Pensacola Bay Center (1,248); Pensacola, FL
March 7, 2026; 5:30 pm, ESPN+	(8)	vs. (4) Appalachian State; Quarterfinals	W 86–73	19–15	28 – Weeks	9 – Tied	5 – Brumfield	Pensacola Bay Center (1,534); Pensacola, FL
March 8, 2026; 5:00 pm, ESPN+	(8)	vs. (1) Troy; Semifinals	L 70–78	19–16	32 – Taveras	9 – Taveras	5 – Brumfield	Pensacola Bay Center (1,850); Pensacola, FL
*Non-conference game. ^{#}Rankings from AP Poll. (#) Tournament seedings in parentheses. All times are in Central.
