= 2025–26 Arkansas State Red Wolves men's basketball team =

American college basketball season

2025–26 Arkansas State Red Wolves men's basketball
- Conference: Sun Belt Conference
- Record: 20–12 (11–7 Sun Belt)
- Head coach: Ryan Pannone (1st season)
- Assistant coaches: Jordan Fair; Rashaad Richardson; Hayden Sowers; Dean Cooper; Anthony Goods
- Home arena: First National Bank Arena

2025–26 Sun Belt Conference men's basketball standings
	Conf.				Overall
Team	W		L	PCT	W		L	PCT
Troy †	12	–	6	.667	22	–	11	.667
Marshall	11	–	7	.611	19	–	13	.594
Coastal Carolina	11	–	7	.611	19	–	13	.594
Appalachian State	11	–	7	.611	19	–	13	.594
Texas State	11	–	7	.611	19	–	13	.594
South Alabama	11	–	7	.611	21	–	11	.656
Arkansas State	11	–	7	.611	20	–	12	.625
Southern Miss	9	–	9	.500	19	–	16	.543
James Madison	9	–	9	.500	18	–	15	.545
Georgia Southern	8	–	10	.444	21	–	16	.568
Old Dominion	7	–	11	.389	12	–	21	.364
Louisiana	7	–	11	.389	11	–	22	.333
Georgia State	7	–	11	.389	10	–	22	.313
Louisiana–Monroe	1	–	17	.056	4	–	28	.125
† 2026 Sun Belt tournament winner As of March 9, 2026

The 2025–26 Arkansas State Red Wolves men's basketball team represented Arkansas State University in the 2025–26 NCAA Division I men's basketball season. The Red Wolves, led by first-year head coach Ryan Pannone, played their home games at the First National Bank Arena in Jonesboro, Arkansas as members of the Sun Belt Conference.

== Previous season ==
The Red Wolves finished the 2024–25 season 25–11, 13–5 in Sun Belt play to finish tied for 1st place, 4th seed in the Sun Belt tournament. They defeated Marshall in the quarterfinals and South Alabama in the semifinals of the Sun Belt tournament before losing to Troy in the championship game.

They were invited to play in the National Invitation Tournament, where they defeated Saint Louis in the first round before losing to North Texas in the second round.

== Preseason ==
=== Preseason Sun Belt Conference poll ===
The Red Wolves were picked to finish in second place in the conference's preseason poll. Junior guard Chandler Jackson was named to the conference preseason second team.

Coaches poll
Predicted finish	Team (1st place Votes)
1	James Madison - 175 (1)
2	Arkansas State - 154 (3)
3	South Alabama - 152 (4)
4	Troy - 148 (1)
5	Old Dominion - 145 (2)
6	Marshall - 128 (1)
7	App State - 123 (1)
8	Texas State - 106
9	Louisiana - 95 (1)
10	Georgia Southern - 66
11	Georgia State - 59
12	Southern Miss - 57
13	Coastal Carolina - 43
14	ULM - 19

== Roster ==
2025–26 Arkansas State Red Wolves men's basketball team
Players
Coaches

Pos.	#	Name	Height	Weight	Year	Previous school	Hometown
G	0	Chandler Jackson	6 ft 5 in (1.96 m)	205 lb (93 kg)	Sr	Florida State	Memphis, Tennessee
G	1	Matt Hayman	6 ft 5 in (1.96 m)	204 lb (93 kg)	GS	Stephen F. Austin	Delhi, Louisiana
G	2	TJ Caldwell	6 ft 4 in (1.93 m)	190 lb (86 kg)	Jr	Ole Miss	Dallas, Texas
G	3	Royal Blue Smith	6 ft 4 in (1.93 m)	185 lb (84 kg)	Fr	Gillion Academy	Parkland, Florida
G	4	Tim Matthews	6 ft 5 in (1.96 m)	180 lb (82 kg)	Fr	Cleveland HS	Memphis, Tennessee
G	5	Christian Harmon	6 ft 6 in (1.98 m)	205 lb (93 kg)	Jr	Gulf Coast State College	Rochester, New York
F	7	Grayson Bennett	6 ft 9 in (2.06 m)	190 lb (86 kg)	Fr	La Lumiere	Houston, Texas
G	8	Weston Honeycutt	6 ft 4 in (1.93 m)	175 lb (79 kg)	Fr	Westside HS	Jonesboro, Arkansas
F	10	Chudi Dioramma	6 ft 10 in (2.08 m)	245 lb (111 kg)	RS So	Sacramento State	London, England
G	12	Jalen Hampton	6 ft 7 in (2.01 m)	200 lb (91 kg)	Sr	Missouri State	St. Louis, Missouri
F	13	Aly Tounkara	7 ft 0 in (2.13 m)	215 lb (98 kg)	So	Lindenwood	Conakry, Guinea
G	15	CJ Geathers	6 ft 4 in (1.93 m)	249 lb (113 kg)	Fr	Chapel Hill HS	Lithia Springs, Georgia
G	20	Joey Chammaa	5 ft 11 in (1.8 m)	180 lb (82 kg)	So	San Diego	Los Angeles, California
G/F	21	Fredy-Salam Sylla	6 ft 8 in (2.03 m)	210 lb (95 kg)	So	Eastern Florida State College	Paris, France
F	22	Jaxon Ellingsworth	6 ft 9 in (2.06 m)	210 lb (95 kg)	Sr	UT Arlington	Morehead City, North Carolina

Head coach

- Ryan Pannone (South Florida)

Assistant coach(es)

- Jordan Fair (St. Petersburg)
- Rashaad Richardson (Georgia State)
- Hayden Sowers (Mississippi)
- Dean Cooper (Aquinas)
- Anthony Goods (Stanford)

Legend

- (C) Team captain
- (S) Suspended
- (I) Ineligible
- (W) Walk-on
- Injured
- Current redshirt

Roster
Last update: 19 October 2025

== Schedule and results ==
Date time, TV	Rank^{#}	Opponent^{#}	Result	Record	High points	High rebounds	High assists	Site (attendance) city, state
Exhibition
October 26, 2025*; 2:00 p.m.		UT Martin	W 76–59		15 – Jackson	13 – Jackson	4 – Jackson	First National Bank Arena; Jonesboro, AR
Regular season
November 3, 2025*; 6:00 p.m., ESPN+		at Ohio; MAC–SBC Challenge	W 89–85	1–0	21 – Tied	8 – Jackson	5 – Jackson	Convocation Center (5,545); Athens, OH
November 7, 2025*; 6:00 p.m., ESPN+		at Stephen F. Austin	L 65–90	1–1	17 – Chammaa	6 – Ellingsworth	3 – Hayman	William R. Johnson Coliseum (1,923); Nacogdoches, TX
November 11, 2025*; 7:00 p.m., ESPN+		at Missouri State	W 86–85	2–1	33 – Jackson	11 – Harmon	4 – Harmon	Great Southern Bank Arena (2,201); Springfield, MO
November 15, 2025*; 7:00 p.m., ESPN+		Christian Brothers	W 95–67	3–1	20 – Ellingsworth	7 – Tied	7 – Jackson	First National Bank Arena (3,182); Jonesboro, AR
November 19, 2025*; 9:00 p.m., ESPN+		at Saint Mary's	L 72–85	3–2	21 – Harmon	6 – Hayman	6 – Jackson	University Credit Union Pavilion (3,087); Moraga, CA
November 21, 2025*; 8:00 p.m., ACCN		at SMU	L 69–100	3–3	20 – Caldwell	9 – Hampton	1 – Tied	Moody Coliseum (4,502); Dallas, Texas
November 24, 2025*; 7:00 p.m., ESPN+		Jacksonville State; Arkansas State Multi-Team Event	W 74–63	4–3	21 – Harmon	7 – Tied	5 – Jackson	First National Bank Arena (3,071); Jonesboro, AR
November 28, 2025*; 2:00 p.m., ESPN+		North Dakota State; Arkansas State Multi-Team Event	W 85–80 ^{OT}	5–3	19 – Caldwell	11 – Hampton	5 – Jackson	First National Bank Arena (3,167); Jonesboro, AR
December 2, 2025*; 7:00 p.m., ESPN+		UT Arlington	W 83–63	6–3	19 – Hampton	8 – Hampton	7 – Jackson	First National Bank Arena (3,389); Jonesboro, AR
December 6, 2025*; 8:00 p.m., ESPN+		at Little Rock	W 90–78	7–3	19 – Caldwell	13 – Hampton	4 – Tied	Jack Stephens Center (2,691); Little Rock, AR
December 13, 2025*; 2:00 p.m., ESPN+		at Rice	L 76–77	7–4	17 – Jackson	5 – Tied	2 – Tied	Tudor Fieldhouse (1,125); Houston, TX
December 17, 2025; 7:30 p.m., ESPN+		at Texas State	W 89–70	8–4 (1–0)	21 – Harmon	8 – Dioramma	8 – Jackson	Strahan Arena (1,203); San Marcos, TX
December 20, 2025; 3:30 p.m., ESPN+		at Southern Miss	W 93–86	9–4 (2–0)	18 – Jackson	7 – Hampton	5 – Harmon	Reed Green Coliseum (2,827); Hattiesburg, MS
December 30, 2025*; 7:00 p.m., ESPN+		Arkansas Tech	W 107–63	10–4	17 – Tied	5 – Tied	6 – Harmon	First National Bank Arena (3,978); Jonesboro, AR
January 3, 2026; 2:00 p.m., ESPN+		James Madison	L 74–78	10–5 (2–1)	23 – Hayman	13 – Hampton	6 – Jackson	First National Bank Arena (4,017); Jonesboro, AR
January 7, 2026; 7:00 p.m., ESPN+		Troy	W 86–74	11–5 (3–1)	18 – Harmon	7 – Hampton	4 – Hayman	First National Bank Arena (3,782); Jonesboro, AR
January 10, 2026; 2:00 p.m., ESPN+		Texas State	W 83–82	12–5 (4–1)	16 – Jackson	12 – Hampton	4 – Jackson	First National Bank Arena (4,059); Jonesboro, AR
January 15, 2026; 7:00 p.m., ESPN+		at South Alabama	L 87–91 ^{OT}	12–6 (4–2)	18 – Tied	13 – Ellingsworth	5 – Harmon	Mitchell Center (2,480); Mobile, AL
January 17, 2026; 3:30 p.m., ESPN+		at Troy	L 74–99	12–7 (4–3)	17 – Caldwell	9 – Hampton	5 – Hayman	Trojan Arena (3,321); Troy, AL
January 22, 2025; 6:00 p.m., ESPN+		at Georgia Southern	W 85–68	13–7 (5–3)	15 – Chammaa	14 – Hammpton	6 – Chammaa	Hill Convocation Center (2,676); Statesboro, GA
January 24, 2025; 1:00 p.m., ESPN+		at Georgia State	L 81–82	13–8 (5–4)	23 – Harmon	12 – Hampton	6 – Jackson	GSU Convocation Center (2,078); Atlanta, GA
January 28, 2026; 7:00 p.m., ESPN+		Old Dominion	L 71–75	13–9 (5–5)	20 – Harmon	12 – Hampton	8 – Jackson	First National Bank Arena (4,776); Jonesboro, AR
January 31, 2026; 2:00 p.m., ESPN+		Marshall	L 61–70	13–10 (5–6)	17 – Hayman	10 – Hampton	4 – Harmon	First National Bank Arena (3,932); Jonesboro, AR
February 4, 2026; 6:00 p.m., ESPN+		at Coastal Carolina	W 70–66	14–10 (6–6)	16 – Harmon	12 – Hampton	5 – Jackson	HTC Center (2,041); Conway, SC
February 7, 2026*; 2:00 p.m., ESPN+		Bowling Green; MAC–SBC Challenge	W 91–54	15–10	18 – Harmon	10 – Tounkara	8 – Jackson	First National Bank Arena (3,570); Jonesboro, AR
February 11, 2026; 7:00 p.m., ESPN+		Louisiana–Monroe	W 103–70	16–10 (7–6)	21 – Harmon	10 – Diorama	6 – Jackson	First National Bank Arena (3,286); Jonesboro, AR
February 14, 2026; 2:00 p.m., ESPN+		South Alabama	L 88–92 ^{OT}	16–11 (7–7)	33 – Harmon	16 – Hampton	7 – Jackson	First National Bank Arena (3,823); Jonesboro, AR
February 19, 2026; 7:00 p.m., ESPN+		at Louisiana	W 79–62	17–11 (8–7)	31 – Jackson	12 – Hampton	2 – Tied	Cajundome (2,552); Lafayette, LA
February 21, 2026; 2:00 p.m., ESPN+		at Louisiana–Monroe	W 102–94	18–11 (9–7)	21 – Chammaa	12 – Tounkara	5 – Chammaa	Fant–Ewing Coliseum (1,606); Monroe, LA
February 24, 2026; 7:30 p.m., ESPN+		Southern Miss	W 89–84	19–11 (10–7)	17 – Hampton	13 – Hampton	5 – Jackson	First National Bank Arena (4,875); Jonesboro, AR
February 27, 2026; 7:30 p.m., ESPN+		Louisiana	W 81–58	20–11 (11–7)	19 – Caldwell	10 – Tied	5 – Hayman	First National Bank Arena (5,074); Jonesboro, AR
Sun Belt tournament
March 5, 2026; 7:30 p.m., ESPN+	(7)	vs. (10) Georgia Southern; Third round	L 77–80	20–12	21 – Hayman	12 – Hampton	10 – Jackson	Pensacola Bay Center; Pensacola, FL
*Non-conference game. ^{#}Rankings from AP Poll. (#) Tournament seedings in parentheses. All times are in Central.
