= Ryan Pannone =

American basketball coach (born 1985)

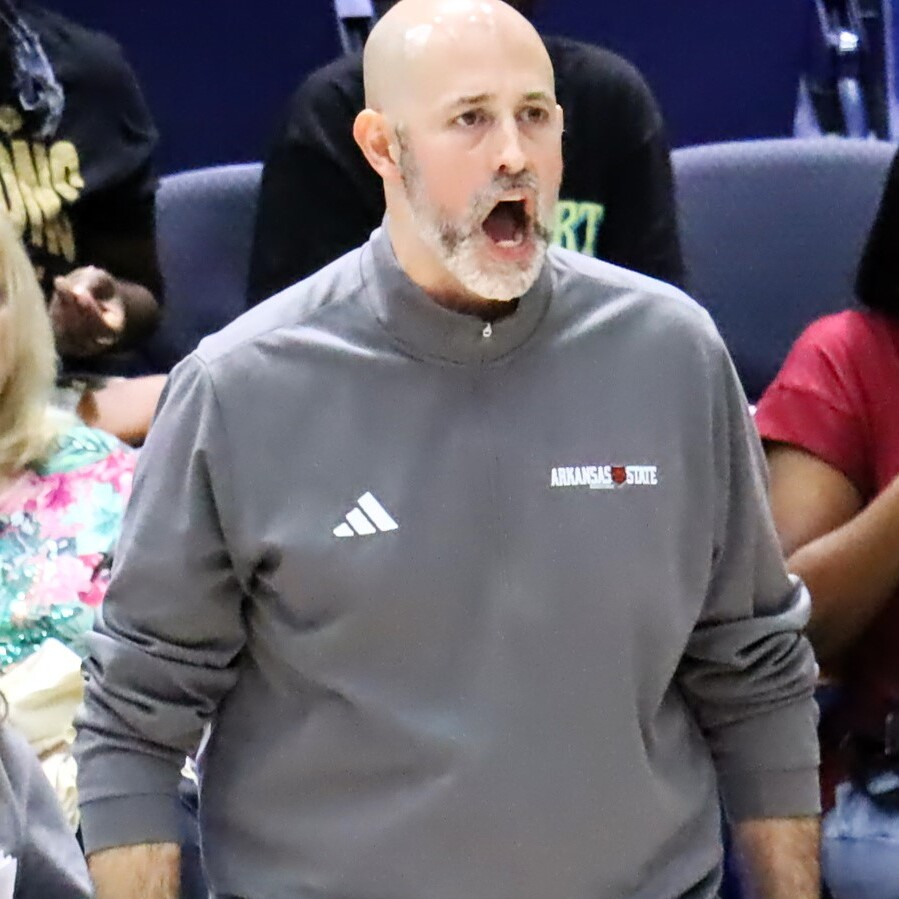
- Pannone with Arkansas State in 2025

Current position
- Title: Head coach
- Team: Arkansas State
- Conference: Sun Belt Conference
- Record: 20–12 (.625)

Biographical details
- Born: January 25, 1985 (age 41); Clearwater, Florida, U.S.
- Education: University of South Florida

Coaching career (HC unless noted)
- 2011–2012: Wallace State CC (assistant)
- 2012–2013: Foshan Long Lions (assistant)
- 2014–2015: Erie BayHawks (assistant)
- 2015–2016: White Wings Hanau (assistant)
- 2016–2017: Hapoel Jerusalem (assistant)
- 2017–2018: Prievidza
- 2018–2019: Hapoel Jerusalem (assistant)
- 2019–2022: Birmingham Squadron
- 2022–2023: New Orleans Pelicans (assistant)
- 2023–2025: Alabama (assistant)
- 2025–present: Arkansas State

Head coaching record
- Overall: 20–12 (.625)

Accomplishments and honors

Championships
- As assistant coach: Israeli League champion (2017); Israeli State Cup winner (2019)

Raymond "Ryan" Pannone (born January 28, 1985) is an American basketball coach who currently serves as the head coach for Arkansas State University.

== Coaching career ==
A native of Clearwater, Florida, Pannone served as assistant coach at Oldsmar Christian School in Oldsmar, Florida from 2003 to 2006. After working as a coach on the AAU circuit, he returned to Oldsmar Christian School, where he worked as head coach from 2006 to 2011, compiling a record of 131–42 during his five-year tenure.

In the 2011–12 season, Pannone served as assistant coach at Wallace State Community College in Hanceville, Alabama and then moved to China to accept the assistant coaching job with the Foshan Long Lions of the Chinese Basketball Association (CBA). At Foshan, he worked under head coach Joe Whelton. In 2013, Pannone worked as an assistant coach for the Memphis Grizzlies in the NBA Summer League in Las Vegas, Nevada. He worked for the Erie BayHawks in the NBA D-League, followed by a one-year tenure as assistant coach at German ProA side WhiteWings Hanau. Between 2015 and 2017, he also spent some time working for the LG Lakers in South Korea.

In the 2016–17 campaign, Pannone served as assistant coach for Hapoel Jerusalem of Israel's top-tier. He won the Israeli championship with Hapoel and reached the EuroCup semifinals in 2016–17. He was named head coach of BC Prievidza of the Slovak Basketball League, the top-tier league in Slovakia, in June 2017 and stayed on that job until the end of the 2017–18 season. In August 2018, he returned to Hapoel Jerusalem to rejoin their staff as an assistant coach. He also became of member of the coaching staff of the Angola men's national team, serving as scout and video coordinator.

As a player development coach, he has worked with numerous NBA players.

In 2019, Pannone was a member of the New Orleans Pelicans' NBA Summer League coaching staff. In August 2019, he was named head coach of the Pelicans' new NBA G League affiliate, the Erie BayHawks. He continued as head coach when the BayHawks relocated to Birmingham, Alabama, as the Birmingham Squadron in 2021.

In September 2022, he took an assistant coach position with the NBA's New Orleans Pelicans. On June 6, 2023, Pannone was appointed assistant coach of the Alabama Crimson Tide men's basketball team.

=== Arkansas State (2025–present) ===
On March 30, 2025, he was named Head Coach of the Arkansas State Red Wolves men's basketball team.

== Head coaching record ==
Record table
Season	Team	Overall	Conference	Standing	Postseason
Arkansas State Red Wolves (Sun Belt Conference) (2025–present)
2025–26	Arkansas State	20–12	11–7	T–2nd	
Arkansas State:		20–12 (.625)	11–7 (.611)		
Total:		20–12 (.625)			
National champion Postseason invitational champion Conference regular season champion Conference regular season and conference tournament champion Division regular season champion Division regular season and conference tournament champion Conference tournament champion
