= Houston Cougars men's basketball statistical leaders =

The Houston Cougars men's basketball statistical leaders are individual statistical leaders of the Houston Cougars men's basketball program in various categories, including points, rebounds, assists, steals, and blocks. Within those areas, the lists identify single-game, single-season, and career leaders. The Cougars represent the University of Houston in the NCAA Division I Big 12 Conference.

Houston began competing in intercollegiate basketball in 1945. However, the school's record book does not generally list records from before the 1950s, as records from before this period are often incomplete and inconsistent. Since scoring was much lower in this era, and teams played much fewer games during a typical season, it is likely that few or no players from this era would appear on these lists anyway.

The NCAA did not officially record assists as a stat until the 1983–84 season, and blocks and steals until the 1985–86 season, but Houston's record books includes players in these stats before these seasons. These lists are updated through the end of the 2025–26 season.

== Scoring ==
Career
Rank	Player	Points	Seasons
1	Elvin Hayes	2,884	1965–66 1966–67 1967–68
2	Otis Birdsong	2,832	1973–74 1974–75 1975–76 1976–77
3	Michael Young	2,043	1980–81 1981–82 1982–83 1983–84
4	Craig Upchurch	1,880	1987–88 1988–89 1989–90 1991–92
5	Rob Williams	1,838	1979–80 1980–81 1981–82
6	Louis Dunbar	1,765	1972–73 1973–74 1974–75
7	Dwight Davis	1,741	1969–70 1970–71 1971–72
8	Rob Gray	1,710	2015–16 2016–17 2017–18
9	Emanuel Sharp	1,702	2022–23 2023–24 2024–25 2025–26
10	Alvin Franklin	1,684	1982–83 1983–84 1984–85 1985–86

Season
Rank	Player	Points	Season
1	Elvin Hayes	1,214	1967–68
2	Otis Birdsong	1,090	1976–77
3	Aubrey Coleman	895	2009–10
4	Elvin Hayes	881	1966–67
5	Robert McKiver	801	2007–08
6	Elvin Hayes	789	1965–66
7	Rob Williams	749	1980–81
8	Michael Young	734	1983–84
9	Ollie Taylor	733	1969–70
10	Otis Birdsong	730	1975–76

Single game
Rank	Player	Points	Season	Opponent
1	Elvin Hayes	62	1967–68	Valparaiso
2	Elvin Hayes	55	1965–66	Southwestern
3	Robert McKiver	52	2007–08	Southern Miss
4	Elvin Hayes	51	1967–68	Virginia Tech
5	Elvin Hayes	50	1967–68	Centenary (LA)
	Lyle Harger	50	1962–63	Trinity (TX)
	Don Boldebuck	50	1954–55	Sam Houston State
8	Elvin Hayes	49	1967–68	Loyola (IL)
9	Elvin Hayes	48	1967–68	Fairfield
10	Elvin Hayes	45	1967–68	Marquette
	Elvin Hayes	45	1967–68	Montana State

== Rebounds ==
Career
Rank	Player	Rebounds	Seasons
1	Elvin Hayes	1,602	1965–66 1966–67 1967–68
2	Akeem Olajuwon	1,067	1981–82 1982–83 1983–84
3	J'Wan Roberts	1,053	2020–21 2021–22 2022–23 2023–24 2024–25
4	Greg Anderson	1,045	1983–84 1984–85 1985–86 1986–87
5	Rickie Winslow	969	1983–84 1984–85 1985–86 1986–87
6	Dwight Davis	961	1969–70 1970–71 1971–72
7	Clyde Drexler	948	1980–81 1981–82 1982–83
8	Don Boldebuck	863	1954–55 1955–56
9	Ken Spain	859	1966–67 1967–68 1968–69
10	TaShawn Thomas	833	2011–12 2012–13 2013–14

Season
Rank	Player	Rebounds	Season
1	Elvin Hayes	624	1967–68
2	Akeem Olajuwon	500	1983–84
3	Elvin Hayes	490	1965–66
4	Elvin Hayes	488	1966–67
5	Don Boldebuck	453	1954–55
6	Ken Spain	422	1967–68
7	Don Boldebuck	410	1955–56
8	Akeem Olajuwon	388	1982–83
9	Dwight Jones	380	1972–73
10	Mike Schultz	362	1976–77

Single game
Rank	Player	Rebounds	Season	Opponent
1	Elvin Hayes	37	1967–68	Centenary (LA)
2	Elvin Hayes	30	1965–66	Southwestern
3	Lyle Harger	29	1962–63	Texas Wesleyan
4	Elvin Hayes	28	1965–66	Pacific
	Elvin Hayes	28	1965–66	Centenary (LA)
6	Elvin Hayes	27	1967–68	Loyola (IL)
	Elvin Hayes	27	1967–68	Virginia Tech
	Elvin Hayes	27	1967–68	Valparaiso
	Elvin Hayes	27	1965–66	TCU
	Don Boldebuck	27	1954–55	Missouri
	Don Boldebuck	27	1955–56	Trinity (TX)

== Assists ==
Career
Rank	Player	Assists	Seasons
1	Reid Gettys	740	1981–82 1982–83 1983–84 1984–85
2	Derrick Daniels	711	1988–89 1989–90 1990–91 1991–92
3	Jamal Shead	693	2020–21 2021–22 2022–23 2023–24
4	Ken Ciolli	629	1975–76 1976–77 1977–78 1978–79
5	Galen Robinson Jr.	578	2015–16 2016–17 2017–18 2018–19
6	Alvin Franklin	502	1982–83 1983–84 1984–85 1985–86
	Lanny Smith	502	2003–04 2004–05 2005–06 2006–07 2007–08
8	Rob Williams	407	1979–80 1980–81 1981–82
9	Otis Birdsong	365	1973–74 1974–75 1975–76 1976–77
10	Joe Hamood	346	1963–64 1964–65 1965–66

Season
Rank	Player	Assists	Season
1	Reid Gettys	309	1983–84
2	Jamal Shead	233	2023–24
3	Jamal Shead	221	2021–22
4	Reid Gettys	209	1982–83
5	Reid Gettys	208	1984–85
6	Ken Ciolli	201	1976–77
7	Jamal Shead	200	2022–23
8	Derrick Daniels	196	1989–90
9	Kingston Flemings	192	2025–26
10	Joe Hamood	190	1965–66

Single game
Rank	Player	Assists	Season	Opponent
1	Reid Gettys	17	1984–85	Rice
2	Derrick Daniels	16	1989–90	Rice
3	Randy Brown	15	1987–88	Fordham
	Reid Gettys	15	1983–84	Kansas
	Poo Welch	15	1969–70	Loyola (LA)
	George Reynolds	15	1967–68	Valparaiso
7	Derrick Daniels	14	1989–90	Texas A&M
	Gerry McGee	14	1985–86	Texas Wesleyan
	Poo Welch	14	1969–70	South Alabama
	Vern Lewis	14	1967–68	Ohio State

== Steals ==
Career
Rank	Player	Steals	Seasons
1	Clyde Drexler	268	1980–81 1981–82 1982–83
2	Ken Ciolli	237	1975–76 1976–77 1977–78 1978–79
3	Jamal Shead	226	2020–21 2021–22 2022–23 2023–24
4	Otis Birdsong	217	1973–74 1974–75 1975–76 1976–77
5	Michael Young	215	1980–81 1981–82 1982–83 1983–84
6	Kenneth Williams	209	1976–77 1977–78 1978–79 1979–80
7	Rickie Winslow	207	1983–84 1984–85 1985–86 1986–87
8	Oliver Lafayette	183	2005–06 2006–07
9	Aubrey Coleman	168	2008–09 2009–10
10	Emanuel Sharp	159	2022–23 2023–24 2024–25 2025–26

Season
Rank	Player	Steals	Season
1	Clyde Drexler	113	1982–83
2	Oliver Lafayette	105	2005–06
3	Clyde Drexler	97	1981–82
4	Aubrey Coleman	93	2009–10
5	Brian Latham	84	2004–05
6	Jamal Shead	80	2023–24
7	Ken Ciolli	78	1977–78
	Oliver Lafayette	78	2006–07
9	Randy Brown	77	1987–88
10	Ken Ciolli	75	1978–79
	Aubrey Coleman	75	2008–09

Single game
Rank	Player	Steals	Season	Opponent
1	Clyde Drexler	11	1982–83	Syracuse
2	Kingston Flemings	8	2025–26	Florida State
	Jamal Shead	8	2020–21	Our Lady of the Lake
	Oliver Lafayette	8	2005–06	BYU
	Dominic Smith	8	2000–01	Charlotte
	Ken Ciolli	8	1976–77	Illinois State
	Ken Ciolli	8	1977–78	Texas Lutheran
	Ken Ciolli	8	1977–78	Xavier
	Cecile Rose	8	1975–76	Houston Baptist
10	Aubrey Coleman	7	2009–10	Tulsa
	Aubrey Coleman	7	2009–10	San Diego
	Aubrey Coleman	7	2008–09	Toledo
	Brian Latham	7	2004–05	South Florida
	Bernard Smith	7	1999–00	Southern Miss
	Rickie Winslow	7	1985–86	UTSA
	Eric Dickens	7	1984–85	TCU
	Michael Young	7	1983–84	Arkansas
	Clyde Drexler	7	1982–83	TCU
	Clyde Drexler	7	1981–82	UC Santa Barbara

== Blocks ==
Career
Rank	Player	Blocks	Seasons
1	Akeem Olajuwon	454	1981–82 1982–83 1983–84
2	Dwight Davis	231	1969–70 1970–71 1971–72
3	Greg Anderson	227	1983–84 1984–85 1985–86 1986–87
4	Bo Outlaw	211	1991–92 1992–93
5	TaShawn Thomas	209	2011–12 2012–13 2013–14
6	Joseph Tugler	162	2023–24 2024–25 2025–26
7	Anwar Ferguson	160	2002–03 2003–04
8	Dwight Jones	155	1970–71 1971–72 1972–73
9	Ja'Vier Francis	146	2021–22 2022–23 2023–24 2024–25
10	Danrad Knowles	137	2013–14 2014–15 2015–16 2016–17

Season
Rank	Player	Blocks	Season
1	Akeem Olajuwon	207	1983–84
2	Akeem Olajuwon	175	1982–83
3	Dwight Davis	125	1970–71
4	Bo Outlaw	114	1992–93
5	Anwar Ferguson	111	2003–04
6	Dwight Davis	106	1971–72
7	Dwight Jones	97	1972–73
	Bo Outlaw	97	1991–92
9	TaShawn Thomas	90	2013–14
10	Tim Moore	83	1994–95

Single game
Rank	Player	Blocks	Season	Opponent
1	Akeem Olajuwon	16	1983–84	Biscayne
2	Dwight Jones	14	1972–73	Houston Baptist
3	Akeem Olajuwon	11	1983–84	Texas
	Akeem Olajuwon	11	1982–83	Arkansas
	Akeem Olajuwon	11	1982–83	NC State
	Akeem Olajuwon	11	1982–83	Southwestern Louisiana
7	Bo Outlaw	10	1992–93	Texas A&M
	Akeem Olajuwon	10	1983–84	Arkansas
	Akeem Olajuwon	10	1983–84	Rice
	Akeem Olajuwon	10	1983–84	Texas A&M
	Akeem Olajuwon	10	1983–84	Texas Tech
	Akeem Olajuwon	10	1983–84	Louisville
	Akeem Olajuwon	10	1982–83	Texas
