= 2024–25 Houston Cougars men's basketball team =

American college basketball season

2024–25 Houston Cougars men's basketball

NCAA tournament, Runner-up Big 12 tournament champions Big 12 regular season champions

National Championship Game, L 63–65 vs. Florida
- Conference: Big 12 Conference

Ranking
- Coaches: No. 2
- AP: No. 2
- Record: 35–5 (19–1 Big 12)
- Head coach: Kelvin Sampson (11th season)
- Associate head coach: Quannas White
- Assistant coaches: K.C. Beard; Hollis Price; Kellen Sampson
- Home arena: Fertitta Center

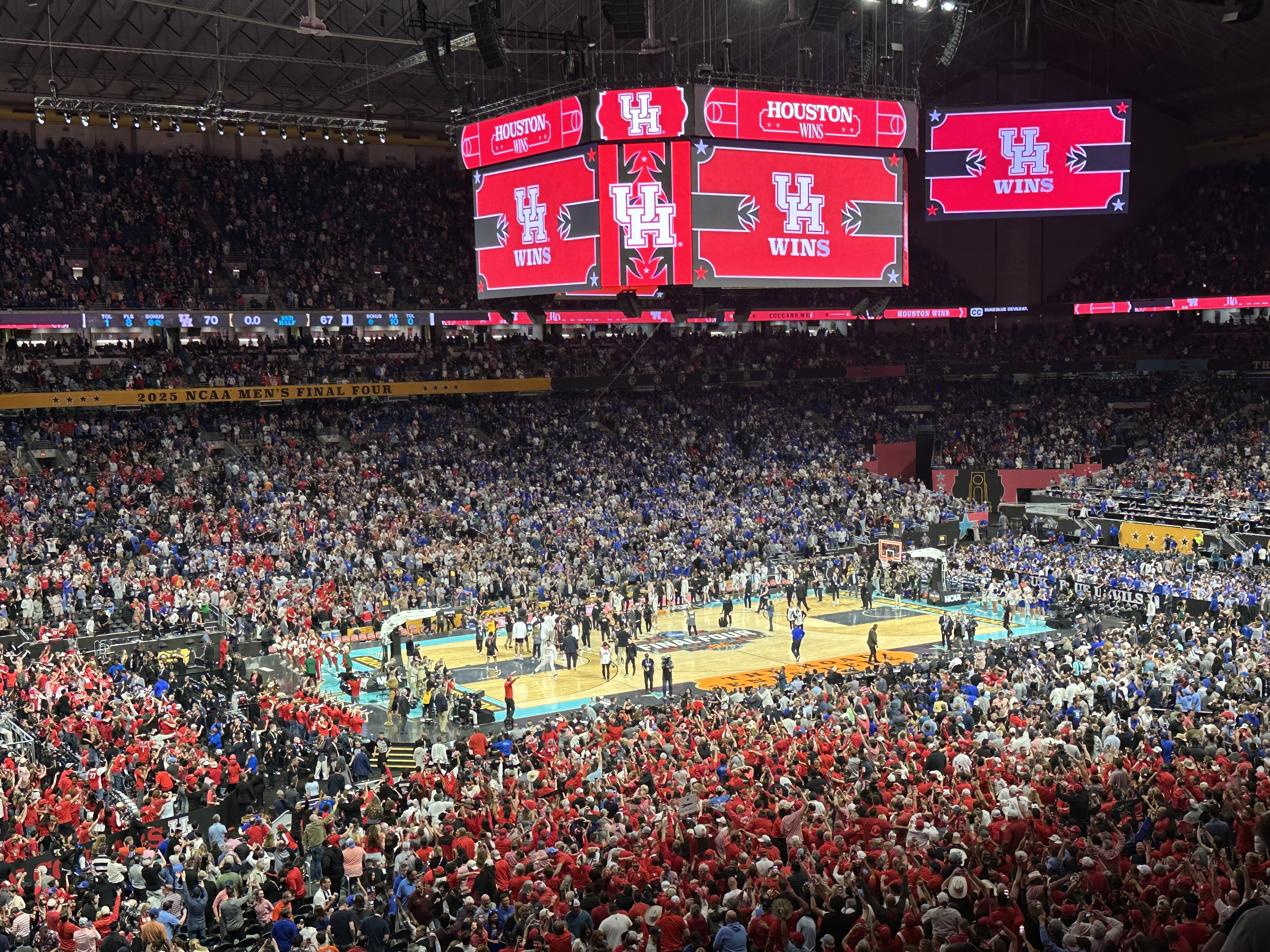
The Alamodome after Houston's 70–67 win over Duke in the 2025 Final Four in San Antonio

2024–25 Big 12 men's basketball standings
	Conf.				Overall
Team	W		L	PCT	W		L	PCT
No. 2 Houston †	19	–	1	.950	35	–	5	.875
No. 8 Texas Tech	15	–	5	.750	28	–	9	.757
No. 15 Arizona	14	–	6	.700	24	–	13	.649
No. 13 BYU	14	–	6	.700	26	–	10	.722
No. 17 Iowa State	13	–	7	.650	25	–	10	.714
Kansas	11	–	9	.550	21	–	13	.618
Baylor	10	–	10	.500	20	–	15	.571
West Virginia	10	–	10	.500	19	–	13	.594
TCU	9	–	11	.450	16	–	16	.500
Kansas State	9	–	11	.450	16	–	17	.485
Utah	8	–	12	.400	16	–	17	.485
Oklahoma State	7	–	13	.350	17	–	18	.486
Cincinnati	7	–	13	.350	19	–	16	.543
UCF	7	–	13	.350	20	–	17	.541
Arizona State	4	–	16	.200	13	–	20	.394
Colorado	3	–	17	.150	14	–	21	.400
† 2025 Big 12 tournament winner Rankings from AP poll

The 2024–25 Houston Cougars men's basketball team represented the University of Houston in the 2024–25 NCAA Division I men's basketball season. The Cougars were led by 11th-year head coach Kelvin Sampson. The team played their home games at the Fertitta Center as second-year members of the Big 12 Conference.

With a win over Cincinnati on March 1, 2025, the Cougars clinched their second straight outright Big 12 regular season conference championship.

As the No. 1 seed in the 2025 Big 12 men's basketball tournament, held at T-Mobile Center in Kansas City, Missouri, Houston received a bye to the quarterfinals. There, they defeated Colorado, 77–68, to advance to the semifinals, where they defeated BYU, 74–54, to advance to the championship game, where they secured a 72–64 victory over Arizona to claim their first tournament title.

As the tournament champion, Houston received an automatic bid to the 2025 NCAA tournament, also as the No. 1 seed. They were seeded in the Midwest region. There, they defeated SIU Edwardsville, 78–40, in the first round, Gonzaga, 81–76, in the second round, Purdue, 62–60, in the Sweet Sixteen, and Tennessee, 69–50, in the Elite Eight to advance to their first Final Four since 2021. In the Final Four, they overcame a 14-point deficit to defeat Duke, 70–67, to advance to their first national championship since 1984. In the championship game, despite leading for nearly the entire game – the same thing Duke did to them in the Final Four – Houston ultimately lost to Florida, 65–63, denying them their first national title.

== Previous season ==
The Cougars finished the 2023–24 season 28–3, 15–3 in Big 12 play to win the regular season championship in their first year in the conference. They defeated TCU and Texas Tech to advance to the Big 12 tournament championship game, where they lost to Iowa State. They received an at-large bid to the NCAA tournament as the No. 1 seed in the South Regional. They defeated Longwood in the First Round and Texas A&M in overtime in the Second Round to advance to their fifth consecutive Sweet Sixteen. There, they were defeated by Duke after losing starting point guard, Jamal Shead, to an ankle sprain during the game.

== Offseason ==
=== Departing players ===
Houston departures
Name	Number	Pos.	Height	Weight	Year	Hometown	Reason for departure
Jamal Shead	1	G	6'1"	200	Senior	Manor, TX	Graduated/declared for the 2024 NBA draft; selected 45th overall by the Sacramento Kings
Damian Dunn	11	G	6'5"	205	(redshirt) Senior	Kinston, NC	Graduated; transferred to Pittsburgh
Ryan Elvin	20	G	6'1"	170	Senior	Round Rock, TX	Walk-on; graduated

=== Incoming transfers ===
Houston incoming transfers
Name	Number	Pos.	Height	Weight	Year	Hometown	Previous school
Milos Uzan	7	G	6'4"	193	Junior	Las Vegas, NV	Oklahoma

=== 2024 recruiting class ===
College recruiting
Name	Hometown	School	Height	Weight	Commit date
Mercy Miller; CG	Sherman Oaks, CA	Notre Dame High School	6 ft 4 in (1.93 m)	180 lb (82 kg)	Aug 30, 2021
Mercy Miller; CG	Recruit ratings: Rivals: 247Sports: (85)				
Chase McCarty; SF	Huntsville, AL	IMG Academy	6 ft 6 in (1.98 m)	200 lb (91 kg)	Oct 13, 2023
Chase McCarty; SF	Recruit ratings: Rivals: 247Sports: (82)				
Overall recruit ranking: 247Sports: 45
Note: In many cases, Scout, Rivals, 247Sports, On3, and ESPN may conflict in their listings of height and weight.; In these cases, the average was taken. ESPN grades are on a 100-point scale.; Sources: "2024 Team Ranking". Rivals.

== Preseason ==
Big 12 preseason poll

	Big 12 Coaches	Points
1.	Kansas	215 (9)
2.	Houston	211 (5)
3.	Iowa State	194 (1)
4.	Baylor	185
5.	Arizona	179 (1)
6.	Cincinnati	140
7.	Texas Tech	135
8.	Kansas State	133
9.	BYU	116
10.	TCU	90
11.	UCF	83
12.	Arizona State	64
13.	West Virginia	62
14.	Oklahoma State	46
15.	Colorado	37
16.	Utah	30
Reference: (#) first-place votes

Pre-Season All-Big 12 Team

First Team

Player	School
Caleb Love	Arizona
LJ Cryer	Houston
J’Wan Roberts	Houston
Tamin Lipsey	Iowa State
Hunter Dickinson†	Kansas
† denotes unanimous selection Reference:

Second Team

Player	School
Norchad Omier	Baylor
Jeremy Roach	Baylor
Keshon Gilbert	Iowa State
Dajuan Harris Jr.	Kansas
Coleman Hawkins	Kansas State
† denotes unanimous selection Reference:

- Player of the Year: Hunter Dickinson, Kansas
- Co-Newcomer of the Year: Jeremy Roach, Baylor & Coleman Hawkins, Kansas State
- Freshman of the Year: V. J. Edgecombe, Baylor

== Roster ==
2024–25 Houston Cougars men's basketball team
Players
Coaches

Pos.	#	Name	Height	Weight	Year	Previous school	Hometown
G	0	Kordelius Jefferson	6 ft 3 in (1.91 m)	200 lb (91 kg)	RS Fr	Martin HS	Arlington, TX
C	2	Cedric Lath	6 ft 9 in (2.06 m)	260 lb (118 kg)	RS So	Balboa School	Abidjan, Ivory Coast
G	3	Ramon Walker Jr.	6 ft 5 in (1.96 m)	215 lb (98 kg)	Sr	Shadow Creek HS	Pearland, TX
G	4	LJ Cryer	6 ft 1 in (1.85 m)	200 lb (91 kg)	GS	Baylor	Katy, TX
F	5	Ja'Vier Francis	6 ft 8 in (2.03 m)	235 lb (107 kg)	Sr	Montverde Academy	New Orleans, LA
G	7	Milos Uzan	6 ft 4 in (1.93 m)	190 lb (86 kg)	Jr	Oklahoma	Las Vegas, NV
G	8	Mylik Wilson	6 ft 3 in (1.91 m)	175 lb (79 kg)	GS	Texas Tech	Rayville, LA
F	11	Joseph Tugler	6 ft 8 in (2.03 m)	230 lb (104 kg)	So	Cypress Falls HS	Houston, TX
C	12	Jacob McFarland	6 ft 11 in (2.11 m)	215 lb (98 kg)	RS Fr	Rancho Verde HS	Moreno Valley, CA
F	13	J'Wan Roberts	6 ft 8 in (2.03 m)	235 lb (107 kg)	GS	Shoemaker HS	Saint Thomas, USVI
G	21	Emanuel Sharp	6 ft 3 in (1.91 m)	210 lb (95 kg)	RS Jr	Bishop McLaughlin CHS	Tampa, FL
G	23	Terrance Arceneaux	6 ft 6 in (1.98 m)	205 lb (93 kg)	RS So	Beaumont United HS	Beaumont, TX
F	24	Chase McCarty (redshirt)	6 ft 6 in (1.98 m)	220 lb (100 kg)	Fr	IMG Academy	Huntsville, AL
G	25	Mercy Miller	6 ft 4 in (1.93 m)	200 lb (91 kg)	Fr	Notre Dame HS	Sherman Oaks, CA

Head coach

- Kelvin Sampson (UNC Pembroke)

Assistant coach(es)

- K.C. Beard (Boise State)
- Hollis Price (Oklahoma)
- Kellen Sampson (Oklahoma)
- Quannas White (Oklahoma)

Legend

- (C) Team captain
- (S) Suspended
- (I) Ineligible
- (W) Walk-on
- Injured
- Current redshirt

Roster
Last update: September 2, 2024

== Schedule and results ==
Date time, TV	Rank^{#}	Opponent^{#}	Result	Record	High points	High rebounds	High assists	Site (attendance) city, state
Exhibition
October 27, 2024*; 4:00 p.m., ESPN+	No. 4	No. 13 Texas A&M	W 79–64	−	18 – Cryer	9 – Tugler	4 – Wilson	Fertitta Center (5,981); Houston, TX
Non-conference regular season
November 4, 2024*; 7:00 p.m., ESPN+	No. 4	Jackson State	W 97–40	1–0	16 – Cryer	7 – Tied	10 – Uzan	Fertitta Center (7,035); Houston, TX
November 9, 2024*; 8:30 p.m., ESPNU	No. 4	vs. No. 11 Auburn; The Battleground 2k24	L 69–74	1–1	13 – Tied	7 – Roberts	4 – Uzan	Toyota Center (6,901); Houston, TX
November 13, 2024*; 7:00 p.m., ESPN+	No. 8	Louisiana	W 91–45	2–1	14 – Arceneaux	6 – Roberts	5 – Uzan	Fertitta Center (7,035); Houston, TX
November 22, 2024*; 7:00 p.m., ESPN+	No. 7	Hofstra	W 80–44	3–1	17 – Tugler	9 – Miller	6 – Uzan	Fertitta Center (7,035); Houston, TX
November 26, 2024*; 7:00 p.m., TBS	No. 6	vs. No. 9 Alabama; Players Era Festival Impact Tournament	L 80–85 ^{OT}	3–2	30 – Cryer	8 – Tugler	2 – Tied	MGM Grand Garden Arena (7,602); Paradise, NV
November 27, 2024*; 11:30 p.m., TBS	No. 6	vs. Notre Dame; Players Era Festival Impact Tournament	W 65–54	4–2	17 – Sharp	8 – Roberts	9 – Uzan	MGM Grand Garden Arena; Paradise, NV
November 30, 2024*; 6:00 p.m., TNT/TruTV	No. 6	vs. San Diego State; Players Era Festival 3rd place game	L 70–73 ^{OT}	4–3	23 – Sharp	12 – Roberts	3 – Tied	MGM Grand Garden Arena; Paradise, NV
December 7, 2024*; 4:30 p.m., ESPN2	No. 17	Butler; Big East–Big 12 Battle	W 79–51	5–3	20 – Cryer	12 – Roberts	3 – Tied	Fertitta Center (7,035); Houston, TX
December 10, 2024*; 7:00 p.m., ESPN+	No. 15	Troy	W 62–42	6–3	22 – Cryer	9 – Roberts	5 – Uzan	Fertitta Center (7,035); Houston, TX
December 18, 2024*; 7:00 p.m., ESPN+	No. 15	Toledo	W 78–49	7–3	16 – Arceneaux	9 – Arceneaux	4 – Tied	Fertitta Center (7,035); Houston, TX
December 21, 2024*; 1:00 p.m., CBSSN	No. 15	Texas A&M–Corpus Christi	W 87–51	8–3	18 – Sharp	11 – Wilson	6 – Uzan	Fertitta Center (7,035); Houston, TX
Big 12 regular season
December 30, 2024; 7:00 p.m., ESPN+	No. 14	at Oklahoma State	W 60–47	9–3 (1–0)	20 – Roberts	11 – Roberts	4 – Uzan	Gallagher-Iba Arena (7,365); Stillwater, OK
January 4, 2025; 4:00 p.m., ESPN+	No. 14	BYU	W 86–55	10–3 (2–0)	18 – Sharp	6 – Tied	8 – Uzan	Fertitta Center (7,035); Houston, TX
January 6, 2025; 7:00 p.m., ESPN2	No. 12	TCU	W 65–46	11–3 (3–0)	14 – Sharp	6 – Tugler	3 – Tied	Fertitta Center (7,035); Houston, TX
January 11, 2025; 5:00 p.m., ESPN+	No. 12	at Kansas State	W 87–57	12–3 (4–0)	15 – Sharp	10 – Tugler	3 – Roberts	Bramlage Coliseum (8,332); Manhattan, KS
January 15, 2025; 7:00 p.m., ESPN+	No. 10	West Virginia	W 70–54	13–3 (5–0)	22 – Roberts	7 – Uzan	4 – Uzan	Fertitta Center (7,035); Houston, TX
January 18, 2025; 11:00 a.m., CBSSN	No. 10	at UCF	W 69–68	14–3 (6–0)	21 – Roberts	10 – Francis	5 – Uzan	Addition Financial Arena (9,014); Orlando, FL
January 22, 2025; 5:00 p.m., ESPN+	No. 7	Utah	W 70–36	15–3 (7–0)	14 – Uzan	7 – Wilson	5 – Uzan	Fertitta Center (7,035); Houston, TX
January 25, 2025; 5:30 p.m., ESPN	No. 7	at No. 12 Kansas	W 92–86 ^{2OT}	16–3 (8–0)	24 – Roberts	9 – Tied	9 – Uzan	Allen Fieldhouse (15,300); Lawrence, KS
January 29, 2025; 6:00 p.m., ESPN+	No. 6	at West Virginia	W 63–49	17–3 (9–0)	17 – Cryer	7 – Tugler	3 – Tied	WVU Coliseum (12,083); Morgantown, WV
February 1, 2025; 5:00 p.m., ESPN2	No. 6	No. 22 Texas Tech	L 81–82 ^{OT}	17–4 (9–1)	22 – Cryer	8 – Tugler	3 – Roberts	Fertitta Center (7,324); Houston, TX
February 4, 2025; 7:00 p.m., ESPN+	No. 5	Oklahoma State	W 72–63	18–4 (10–1)	18 – Cryer	10 – Roberts	6 – Arceneaux	Fertitta Center (7,035); Houston, TX
February 8, 2025; 3:00 p.m., ESPN+	No. 5	at Colorado	W 69–59	19–4 (11–1)	20 – Roberts	10 – Tugler	3 – Tied	CU Events Center (7,485); Boulder, CO
February 10, 2025; 8:00 p.m., ESPN	No. 6	Baylor	W 76–65	20–4 (12–1)	14 – Cryer	8 – Tugler	6 – Uzan	Fertitta Center (7,035); Houston, TX
February 15, 2025; 1:00 p.m., ESPN	No. 6	at No. 13 Arizona	W 62–58	21–4 (13–1)	19 – Uzan	7 – Francis	5 – Uzan	McKale Center (14,688); Tucson, AZ
February 18, 2025; 8:00 p.m., ESPN2	No. 5	at Arizona State	W 80–65	22–4 (14–1)	18 – Cryer	7 – Wilson	6 – Cryer	Desert Financial Arena (8,315); Tempe, AZ
February 22, 2025; 1:00 p.m., ESPN	No. 5	No. 8 Iowa State; College GameDay	W 68–59	23–4 (15–1)	28 – Cryer	6 – Tied	2 – Tied	Fertitta Center (7,377); Houston, TX
February 24, 2025; 8:00 p.m., ESPN	No. 4	at No. 10 Texas Tech	W 69–61	24–4 (16–1)	22 – Uzan	7 – Roberts	3 – Tied	United Supermarkets Arena (15,098); Lubbock, TX
March 1, 2025; 3:30 p.m., CBS	No. 4	Cincinnati	W 73–64	25–4 (17–1)	20 – Cryer	6 – Francis	3 – Tugler	Fertitta Center (7,035); Houston, TX
March 3, 2025; 8:00 p.m., ESPN	No. 3	Kansas	W 65–59	26–4 (18–1)	22 – Cryer	8 – Tugler	6 – Wilson	Fertitta Center (7,231); Houston, TX
March 8, 2025; 9:00 p.m., ESPN	No. 3	at Baylor	W 65–61	27–4 (19–1)	23 – Cryer	10 – Roberts	3 – Uzan	Foster Pavilion (7,500); Waco, TX
Big 12 tournament
March 13, 2025; 2:00 p.m., ESPN2	(1) No. 2	vs. (16) Colorado; Quarterfinals	W 77–68	28–4	19 – Sharp	9 – Tugler	2 – Wilson	T-Mobile Center (15,366); Kansas City, MO
March 14, 2025; 6:00 p.m., ESPN2	(1) No. 2	vs. (4) No. 17 BYU; Semifinals	W 74–54	29–4	26 – Sharp	13 – Wilson	5 – Uzan	T-Mobile Center (13,946); Kansas City, MO
March 15, 2025; 5:00 p.m., ESPN	(1) No. 2	vs. (3) Arizona; Championship	W 72–64	30–4	25 – Uzan	7 – Tied	4 – Uzan	T-Mobile Center (13,768); Kansas City, MO
NCAA tournament
March 20, 2025*; 1:00 p.m., TBS	(1 MW) No. 2	vs. (16 MW) SIU Edwardsville; First Round	W 78–40	31–4	16 – Uzan	9 – Wilson	4 – Cryer	Intrust Bank Arena (14,355); Wichita, KS
March 22, 2025*; 7:45 p.m., TNT	(1 MW) No. 2	vs. (8 MW) No. 24 Gonzaga; Second Round	W 81–76	32–4	30 – Cryer	11 – Tugler	8 – Uzan	Intrust Bank Arena (14,168); Wichita, KS
March 28, 2025*; 9:09 p.m., TBS	(1 MW) No. 2	vs. (4 MW) No. 22 Purdue; Sweet Sixteen	W 62–60	33–4	22 – Uzan	12 – Roberts	6 – Uzan	Lucas Oil Stadium (28,968); Indianapolis, IN
March 30, 2025*; 1:20 p.m., CBS	(1 MW) No. 2	vs. (2 MW) No. 6 Tennessee; Elite Eight	W 69–50	34–4	17 – Cryer	9 – Tugler	4 – Tied	Lucas Oil Stadium (18,567); Indianapolis, IN
April 5, 2025; 7:49 p.m., CBS	(1 MW) No. 2	vs. (1 E) No. 1 Duke; Final Four	W 70–67	35–4	26 – Cryer	12 – Roberts	5 – Roberts	Alamodome (68,252); San Antonio, TX
April 7, 2025; 7:50 p.m., CBS	(1 MW) No. 2	vs. (1 W) No. 3 Florida; National Championship	L 63–65	35–5	19 – Cryer	8 – Roberts	2 – Cryer	Alamodome (66,602); San Antonio, TX
*Non-conference game. ^{#}Rankings from AP Poll. (#) Tournament seedings in parentheses. MW=Midwest region. E=East region. W=West region. All times are in Central Time.

== Rankings ==
Ranking movements Legend: ██ Increase in ranking ██ Decrease in ranking ( ) = First-place votes
	Week																				
Poll	Pre	1	2	3	4	5	6	7	8	9	10	11	12	13	14	15	16	17	18	19	Final
AP	4 (4)	8	7	6	17	15	15	15	14	12	10	7	6	5	6	5	4	3	2 (5)	2 (6)	2
Coaches	4 (4)	10	8	7	18	13	12	12	14	11	8	5	5	5	6	5	4	3	2 (2)	2 (2)	2
