= 2023–24 Houston Cougars men's basketball team =

American college basketball season

2023–24 Houston Cougars men's basketball

Big 12 regular season champions Charleston Classic champions

NCAA tournament, Sweet Sixteen
- Conference: Big 12 Conference

Ranking
- Coaches: No. 3
- AP: No. 3
- Record: 32–5 (15–3 Big 12)
- Head coach: Kelvin Sampson (10th season)
- Associate head coach: Quannas White
- Assistant coaches: K.C. Beard; Hollis Price; Kellen Sampson
- Home arena: Fertitta Center

2023–24 Big 12 men's basketball standings
	Conf.				Overall
Team	W		L	PCT	W		L	PCT
No. 3т Houston	15	–	3	.833	32	–	5	.865
No. 8 Iowa State †	13	–	5	.722	29	–	8	.784
No. 16 Baylor	11	–	7	.611	24	–	11	.686
Texas Tech	11	–	7	.611	23	–	11	.676
BYU	10	–	8	.556	23	–	11	.676
No. 19 Kansas	10	–	8	.556	23	–	11	.676
Texas	9	–	9	.500	21	–	13	.618
TCU	9	–	9	.500	21	–	13	.618
Oklahoma	8	–	10	.444	20	–	12	.625
Kansas State	8	–	10	.444	19	–	15	.559
Cincinnati	7	–	11	.389	22	–	15	.595
UCF	7	–	11	.389	17	–	16	.515
Oklahoma State	4	–	14	.222	12	–	20	.375
West Virginia	4	–	14	.222	9	–	23	.281
† 2024 Big 12 tournament winner Rankings from AP poll

The 2023–24 Houston Cougars men's basketball team represented the University of Houston in the 2023–24 NCAA Division I men's basketball season. The Cougars were led by tenth-year head coach Kelvin Sampson. The team played their home games at the Fertitta Center as first-year members of the Big 12 Conference.

Houston finished the regular season 28–3, 15–3 in conference play, and were regular-season champions of the Big 12 in their first year in the conference. In the Big 12 tournament, Houston defeated TCU and Texas Tech before losing to Iowa State in the championship game. They received an at-large bid to the NCAA tournament as the #1 seed in the South Regional. They defeated Longwood in the first round and Texas A&M in overtime in the second round to advance to their fifth consecutive Sweet Sixteen appearance. There, they were defeated by Duke after losing their starting point guard, Jamal Shead, to an ankle sprain during the game.

== Previous season ==
The Cougars finished the 2022–23 season 29–2, 17–1 in AAC play to win the AAC regular season championship. They defeated East Carolina and Cincinnati to advance to the AAC tournament championship game where they lost to Memphis. They received an at-large bid to the NCAA tournament as the #1 seed in the Midwest Regional. They defeated Northern Kentucky and Auburn to advance to the Sweet Sixteen for the fourth consecutive year. There they lost to Miami (FL).

On November 28, 2022, the team reached the number one ranking in the AP Poll, marking the first time they had held the top spot since 1983. The season marked Houston's last as a member of the AAC. They became a member of the Big 12 Conference on July 1, 2023.

== Offseason ==
=== Departing players ===
Houston departures
Name	Number	Pos.	Height	Weight	Year	Hometown	Reason for departure
Marcus Sasser	0	G	6'2"	195	Senior	Dallas, TX	Graduated/declared for the 2023 NBA draft; selected 25th overall by the Memphis Grizzlies
Darius Bowser	4	C	6'9"	250	Graduate student	Gaffney, SC	Exhausted eligibility
Tramon Mark	12	G	6'5"	195	(redshirt) Sophomore	Dickinson, TX	Transferred to Arkansas
Jarace Walker	25	F	6'8"	240	Freshman	New Freedom, PA	Declared for the 2023 NBA draft; selected 8th overall by the Washington Wizards
Reggie Chaney	32	F	6'8"	230	Graduate student	Tulsa, OK	Exhausted eligibility

=== Incoming transfers ===
Houston incoming transfers
Name	Number	Pos.	Height	Weight	Year	Hometown	Previous school
LJ Cryer	4	G	6'1"	185	Senior	Katy, TX	Baylor
Damian Dunn	11	G	6'5"	195	(redshirt) Senior	Kinston, NC	Temple

=== 2023 recruiting class ===
College recruiting
Name	Hometown	School	Height	Weight	Commit date
Kordelius Jefferson; CG	Arlington, TX	Martin High School	6 ft 3 in (1.91 m)	180 lb (82 kg)	May 16, 2022
Kordelius Jefferson; CG	Recruit ratings: Rivals: 247Sports: (79)				
Joseph Tugler; PF / C	Houston, TX	Cypress Falls High School	6 ft 7 in (2.01 m)	215 lb (98 kg)	May 25, 2022
Joseph Tugler; PF / C	Recruit ratings: Rivals: 247Sports: (83)				
Jacob McFarland; C	Moreno Valley, CA	Rancho Verde High School	6 ft 10 in (2.08 m)	205 lb (93 kg)	Sep 23, 2022
Jacob McFarland; C	Recruit ratings: Rivals: 247Sports: (82)				
Cedric Lath; C	Abidjan, Ivory Coast	Balboa School (CA)	6 ft 10 in (2.08 m)	235 lb (107 kg)	Nov 16, 2022
Cedric Lath; C	Recruit ratings: 247Sports:				
Overall recruit ranking: 247Sports: 23
Note: In many cases, Scout, Rivals, 247Sports, On3, and ESPN may conflict in their listings of height and weight.; In these cases, the average was taken. ESPN grades are on a 100-point scale.; Sources: "2023 Team Ranking". Rivals.

== Roster ==
2023–24 Houston Cougars men's basketball team
Players
Coaches

Pos.	#	Name	Height	Weight	Year	Previous school	Hometown
G	1	Jamal Shead	6 ft 1 in (1.85 m)	200 lb (91 kg)	Sr	Manor HS	Manor, TX
C	2	Cedric Lath	6 ft 9 in (2.06 m)	265 lb (120 kg)	RS Fr	Balboa School	Abidjan, Ivory Coast
G	3	Ramon Walker Jr.	6 ft 4 in (1.93 m)	210 lb (95 kg)	Jr	Shadow Creek HS	Pearland, TX
G	4	LJ Cryer	6 ft 1 in (1.85 m)	200 lb (91 kg)	Sr	Baylor	Katy, TX
F	5	Ja'Vier Francis	6 ft 8 in (2.03 m)	240 lb (109 kg)	Jr	Montverde Academy	New Orleans, LA
G	8	Mylik Wilson	6 ft 2 in (1.88 m)	175 lb (79 kg)	RS Sr	Texas Tech	Rayville, LA
G	11	Damian Dunn	6 ft 5 in (1.96 m)	205 lb (93 kg)	RS Sr	Temple	Kinston, NC
C	12	Jacob McFarland (redshirt)	6 ft 11 in (2.11 m)	210 lb (95 kg)	Fr	Rancho Verde HS	Moreno Valley, CA
F	13	J'Wan Roberts	6 ft 7 in (2.01 m)	235 lb (107 kg)	RS Sr	Shoemaker HS	Saint Thomas, USVI
G	15	Kordelius Jefferson (redshirt)	6 ft 3 in (1.91 m)	200 lb (91 kg)	Fr	Martin HS	Arlington, TX
G	20	Ryan Elvin (W)	6 ft 1 in (1.85 m)	170 lb (77 kg)	Sr	Cedar Ridge HS	Round Rock, TX
G	21	Emanuel Sharp	6 ft 3 in (1.91 m)	205 lb (93 kg)	RS So	Bishop McLaughlin CHS	Tampa, FL
G	23	Terrance Arceneaux	6 ft 5 in (1.96 m)	205 lb (93 kg)	So	Beaumont United HS	Beaumont, TX
F	25	Joseph Tugler	6 ft 7 in (2.01 m)	230 lb (104 kg)	Fr	Cypress Falls HS	Houston, TX

Head coach

- Kelvin Sampson (UNC Pembroke)

Assistant coach(es)

- K.C. Beard (Boise State)
- Hollis Price (Oklahoma)
- Kellen Sampson (Oklahoma)
- Quannas White (Oklahoma)

Legend

- (C) Team captain
- (S) Suspended
- (I) Ineligible
- (W) Walk-on
- Injured
- Current redshirt

Roster

== Schedule and results ==
Date time, TV	Rank^{#}	Opponent^{#}	Result	Record	High points	High rebounds	High assists	Site (attendance) city, state
Exhibition
October 28, 2023*; 3:00 p.m.	No. 7	UNC Pembroke	W 86–47	−	21 – Cryer	9 – Tugler	8 – Shead	Fertitta Center (6,746); Houston, TX
Non-conference regular season
November 6, 2023*; 7:00 p.m., ESPN+	No. 7	Louisiana–Monroe	W 84–31	1–0	20 – Sharp	7 – Tied	8 – Shead	Fertitta Center (6,832); Houston, TX
November 11, 2023*; 12:30 p.m., ESPN+	No. 7	Texas A&M–Corpus Christi	W 82–50	2–0	17 – Roberts	9 – Roberts	4 – Tied	Fertitta Center (7,145); Houston, TX
November 13, 2023*; 7:00 p.m., ESPN+	No. 6	Stetson	W 79–48	3–0	21 – Cryer	7 – Francis	8 – Shead	Fertitta Center (7,104); Houston, TX
November 16, 2023*; 5:30 p.m., ESPN2	No. 6	vs. Towson; Charleston Classic quarterfinals	W 65–49	4–0	18 – Cryer	11 – Roberts	8 – Shead	TD Arena; Charleston, SC
November 17, 2023*; 3:30 p.m., ESPN2	No. 6	vs. Utah; Charleston Classic semifinals	W 76–66	5–0	15 – Sharp	12 – Roberts	5 – Shead	TD Arena; Charleston, SC
November 19, 2023*; 7:30 p.m., ESPN	No. 6	vs. Dayton; Charleston Classic championship	W 69–55	6–0	18 – Cryer	9 – Francis	4 – Shead	TD Arena (3,841); Charleston, SC
November 24, 2023*; 3:00 p.m., ESPN+	No. 6	Montana	W 79–44	7–0	24 – Cryer	9 – Arceneaux	7 – Shead	Fertitta Center (7,451); Houston, TX
December 1, 2023*; 5:30 p.m., FS1	No. 6	at Xavier; Big East–Big 12 Battle	W 66–60	8–0	23 – Cryer	12 – Roberts	4 – Tied	Cintas Center (10,472); Cincinnati, OH
December 6, 2023*; 7:00 p.m., ESPN+	No. 3	Rice; Rivalry	W 75–39	9–0	15 – Cryer	9 – Arceneaux	8 – Shead	Fertitta Center (7,159); Houston, TX
December 9, 2023*; 3:00 p.m., ESPN+	No. 3	Jackson State	W 89–55	10–0	25 – Sharp	10 – Arceneaux	6 – Shead	Fertitta Center (7,122); Houston, TX
December 16, 2023*; 1:30 p.m., ESPN2	No. 4	vs. Texas A&M; The Halal Guys Showcase	W 70–66	11–0	21 – Sharp	11 – Roberts	8 – Shead	Toyota Center (12,152); Houston, TX
December 21, 2023*; 7:00 p.m., ESPN+	No. 3	Texas State	W 72–37	12–0	17 – Sharp	7 – Wilson	3 – Cryer	Fertitta Center (7,231); Houston, TX
December 30, 2023*; 6:00 p.m., ESPN+	No. 3	Penn	W 81–42	13–0	16 – Cryer	9 – Francis	4 – Tied	Fertitta Center (7,216); Houston, TX
Big 12 regular season
January 6, 2024; 1:00 p.m., ESPN+	No. 3	West Virginia	W 89–55	14–0 (1–0)	20 – Cryer	7 – Sharp	11 – Shead	Fertitta Center (7,387); Houston, TX
January 9, 2024; 6:00 p.m., ESPN2	No. 2	at Iowa State	L 53–57	14–1 (1–1)	20 – Sharp	8 – Roberts	3 – Tied	Hilton Coliseum (14,267); Ames, IA
January 13, 2024; 6:00 p.m., ESPN	No. 2	at TCU	L 67–68	14–2 (1–2)	20 – Roberts	13 – Roberts	5 – Tied	Schollmaier Arena (6,151); Fort Worth, TX
January 17, 2024; 8:00 p.m., ESPNU	No. 5	No. 25 Texas Tech	W 77–54	15–2 (2–2)	29 – Shead	7 – Roberts	10 – Shead	Fertitta Center (7,586); Houston, TX
January 20, 2024; 1:00 p.m., ESPN+	No. 5	UCF	W 57–42	16–2 (3–2)	16 – Cryer	7 – Tied	5 – Shead	Fertitta Center (7,184); Houston, TX
January 23, 2024; 8:00 p.m., ESPN+	No. 4	at No. 21 BYU	W 75–68	17–2 (4–2)	23 – Cryer	9 – Sharp	4 – Shead	Marriott Center (16,553); Provo, UT
January 27, 2024; 11:00 a.m., ESPN	No. 4	Kansas State	W 74–52	18–2 (5–2)	17 – Shead	8 – Francis	3 – Shead	Fertitta Center (7,260); Houston, TX
January 29, 2024; 8:00 p.m., ESPN	No. 4	at Texas	W 76–72 ^{OT}	19–2 (6–2)	25 – Shead	8 – Tied	4 – Shead	Moody Center (11,313); Austin, TX
February 3, 2024; 3:00 p.m., ESPN	No. 4	at No. 8 Kansas	L 65–78	19–3 (6–3)	24 – Cryer	13 – Roberts	9 – Shead	Allen Fieldhouse (16,300); Lawrence, KS
February 6, 2024; 6:00 p.m., ESPN2	No. 5	Oklahoma State	W 79–63	20–3 (7–3)	23 – Shead	6 – Tied	4 – Tied	Fertitta Center (7,205); Houston, TX
February 10, 2024; 3:00 p.m., ESPN2	No. 5	at Cincinnati	W 67–62	21–3 (8–3)	20 – Roberts	8 – Roberts	4 – Shead	Fifth Third Arena (12,715); Cincinnati, OH
February 17, 2024; 12:00 p.m., CBS	No. 3	Texas	W 82–61	22–3 (9–3)	26 – Cryer	11 – Shead	6 – Shead	Fertitta Center (7,904); Houston, TX
February 19, 2024; 8:00 p.m., ESPN	No. 2	No. 6 Iowa State	W 73–65	23–3 (10–3)	26 – Shead	7 – Francis	6 – Shead	Fertitta Center (7,895); Houston, TX
February 24, 2024; 11:00 a.m., CBS	No. 2	at No. 11 Baylor	W 82–76 ^{OT}	24–3 (11–3)	18 – Sharp	8 – Roberts	10 – Shead	Foster Pavilion (7,500); Waco, TX
February 27, 2024; 6:00 p.m., ESPN2	No. 1	Cincinnati	W 67–59	25–3 (12–3)	22 – Cryer	5 – Tied	11 – Shead	Fertitta Center (7,352); Houston, TX
March 2, 2024; 7:00 p.m., ESPN2	No. 1	at Oklahoma	W 87–85	26–3 (13–3)	23 – Cryer	5 – Tied	6 – Shead	Lloyd Noble Center (10,960); Norman, OK
March 6, 2024; 7:00 p.m., ESPN+	No. 1	at UCF	W 67–59	27–3 (14–3)	25 – Cryer	8 – Francis	8 – Shead	Addition Financial Arena (9,390); Orlando, FL
March 9, 2024; 3:00 p.m., ESPN	No. 1	No. 14 Kansas	W 76–46	28–3 (15–3)	13 – Shead	8 – Roberts	8 – Shead	Fertitta Center (7,933); Houston, TX
Big 12 tournament
March 14, 2024; 2:00 p.m., ESPN	(1) No. 1	vs. (8) TCU; Quarterfinals	W 60–45	29–3	14 – Sharp	10 – Roberts	5 – Shead	T-Mobile Center (17,186); Kansas City, MO
March 15, 2024; 6:00 p.m., ESPN2	(1) No. 1	vs. (4) No. 25 Texas Tech; Semifinals	W 82–59	30–3	20 – Cryer	9 – Francis	10 – Shead	T-Mobile Center (19,135); Kansas City, MO
March 16, 2024; 5:00 p.m., ESPN	(1) No. 1	vs. (2) No. 7 Iowa State; Championship	L 41–69	30–4	10 – Shead	10 – Wilson	3 – Shead	T-Mobile Center (19,135); Kansas City, MO
NCAA tournament
March 22, 2024; 8:20 p.m., TNT	(1 S) No. 2	vs. (16 S) Longwood; First Round	W 86–46	31–4	17 – Tied	6 – Wilson	9 – Shead	FedExForum (13,797); Memphis, TN
March 24, 2024; 7:40 p.m., TNT	(1 S) No. 2	vs. (9 S) Texas A&M; Second Round	W 100–95 ^{OT}	32–4	30 – Sharp	8 – Roberts	10 – Shead	FedExForum (13,506); Memphis, TN
March 29, 2024; 8:39 p.m., CBS	(1 S) No. 2	vs. (4 S) No. 13 Duke; Sweet Sixteen	L 51–54	32–5	15 – Cryer	8 – Tied	3 – Shead	American Airlines Center (18,751); Dallas, TX
*Non-conference game. ^{#}Rankings from AP Poll. (#) Tournament seedings in parentheses. S=South region. All times are in Central Time.

== Rankings ==
Ranking movements Legend: ██ Increase in ranking ██ Decrease in ranking ( ) = First-place votes
	Week																				
Poll	Pre	1	2	3	4	5	6	7	8	9	10	11	12	13	14	15	16	17	18	19	Final
AP	7	6	6	6	3 (3)	4 (1)	3 (8)	3 (9)	3 (9)	2 (7)	5	4	4 (1)	5	3	2	1 (53)	1 (52)	1 (52)	2 (1)	3
Coaches	6	6	6	5	2 (5)	3 (3)	3 (9)	3 (7)	3 (8)	2 (10)	5	4	4	5	3	2	1 (25)	1 (28)	1 (29)	2	3
