= 2022–23 Houston Cougars men's basketball team =

2022–23 Houston Cougars men's basketball

AAC regular season champions

NCAA tournament, Sweet Sixteen
- Conference: American Athletic Conference

Ranking
- Coaches: No. 6
- AP: No. 2
- Record: 33–4 (17–1 AAC)
- Head coach: Kelvin Sampson (9th season)
- Assistant coaches: K.C. Beard; Hollis Price; Kellen Sampson; Quannas White
- Home arena: Fertitta Center

2022–23 American Athletic Conference men's basketball standings
| | Conf. | | | | Overall |
| Team | W | | L | PCT | W | | L | PCT |
|---|---|---|---|---|---|---|---|---|
| No. 2 Houston | 17 | – | 1 | .944 | 33 | – | 4 | .892 |
| No. 24 Memphis † | 13 | – | 5 | .722 | 26 | – | 9 | .743 |
| Tulane | 12 | – | 6 | .667 | 20 | – | 11 | .645 |
| Cincinnati | 11 | – | 7 | .611 | 23 | – | 13 | .639 |
| Temple | 10 | – | 8 | .556 | 16 | – | 16 | .500 |
| Wichita State | 9 | – | 9 | .500 | 17 | – | 15 | .531 |
| UCF | 8 | – | 10 | .444 | 19 | – | 15 | .559 |
| South Florida | 7 | – | 11 | .389 | 14 | – | 18 | .438 |
| East Carolina | 6 | – | 12 | .333 | 16 | – | 17 | .485 |
| SMU | 5 | – | 13 | .278 | 10 | – | 22 | .313 |
| Tulsa | 1 | – | 17 | .056 | 5 | – | 25 | .167 |
† 2023 AAC tournament winner Rankings from AP poll

The 2022–23 Houston Cougars men's basketball team represented the University of Houston in the 2022–23 NCAA Division I men's basketball season. The Cougars were led by ninth-year head coach Kelvin Sampson. The team played their home games at the Fertitta Center as members of the American Athletic Conference. In September 2021, Houston and fellow conference members Cincinnati and UCF accepted bids to join the Big 12 Conference. They finished the season 33–4, 17–1 in AAC play, to win the AAC regular season championship. They defeated East Carolina and Cincinnati to advance to the AAC tournament championship game where they lost to Memphis. They received an at-large bid to the NCAA tournament as the #1 seed in the Midwest Regional. They defeated Northern Kentucky and Auburn to advance to the Sweet Sixteen for the fourth consecutive year. There they lost to Miami (FL).

On November 28, 2022, the team reached the number one ranking in the AP poll, marking the first time they had held the top spot since 1983. The season marked Houston's last as a member of the AAC. They became a member of the Big 12 Conference on July 1, 2023.

== Previous season ==
The Cougars finished the 2021–22 season 26–5, 15–3 in AAC play, to win the AAC regular season championship. They defeated Cincinnati, Tulane and Memphis to win the AAC tournament championship. As a result, they received the conference's automatic bid to the NCAA tournament as the No. 5 seed in the South region. They defeated UAB and Illinois to advance to the Sweet Sixteen for the third consecutive season. There they defeated Arizona before losing to Villanova in the Elite Eight.

== Offseason ==
=== Departing players ===
Houston departing players
| Name | Number | Pos. | Height | Weight | Year | Hometown | Reason for departure |
|---|---|---|---|---|---|---|---|
| Robbie Armbrester | 2 | G | 6'4" | 220 | Freshman | Atlanta, GA | Transferred to Stephen F. Austin |
| Tazé Moore | 4 | G | 6'5" | 195 | Graduate student | Southaven, MS | Exhausted eligibility |
| Kyler Edwards | 11 | G | 6'4" | 205 | Senior | Arlington, TX | Graduated; declared for the 2022 NBA draft |
| Josh Carlton | 25 | F/C | 6'10" | 245 | Graduate student | Winterville, NC | Exhausted eligibility |
| Fabian White Jr. | 35 | F | 6'8" | 230 | Graduate student | Atascocita, TX | Exhausted eligibility |
| Kiyron Powell | 52 | C | 6'8" | 210 | Sophomore | Evansville, IN | Transferred to Southern Indiana |

=== Incoming transfers ===
Houston incoming transfers
| Name | Number | Pos. | Height | Weight | Year | Hometown | Previous school |
|---|---|---|---|---|---|---|---|
| Mylik Wilson | 13 | G | 6'3" | 175 | Senior | Rayville, LA | Texas Tech |
| Sadarius Bowser | 22 | C | 6'9" | 230 | Graduate student | Gaffney, SC | Charleston Southern |

=== 2022 recruiting class ===
College recruiting information
| Name | Hometown | School | Height | Weight | Commit date |
|---|---|---|---|---|---|
| Emanuel Sharp; SG | Tampa, FL | Bishop McLaughlin Catholic High School | 6 ft 4 in (1.93 m) | 200 lb (91 kg) | May 13, 2021 |
| Emanuel Sharp; SG | Recruit ratings: Rivals: 247Sports: (82) | | | | |
| Terrance Arceneaux; SF | Beaumont, TX | Beaumont United High School | 6 ft 7 in (2.01 m) | 190 lb (86 kg) | Sep 17, 2021 |
| Terrance Arceneaux; SF | Recruit ratings: Rivals: 247Sports: (83) | | | | |
| Jarace Walker; PF / SF | New Freedom, PA | IMG Academy | 6 ft 8 in (2.03 m) | 220 lb (100 kg) | Nov 4, 2021 |
| Jarace Walker; PF / SF | Recruit ratings: Rivals: 247Sports: (92) | | | | |
Overall recruit ranking: 247Sports: 12
Note: In many cases, Scout, Rivals, 247Sports, On3, and ESPN may conflict in their listings of height and weight.; In these cases, the average was taken. ESPN grades are on a 100-point scale.; Sources: "2022 Team Ranking". Rivals.

=== 2023 recruiting class ===
College recruiting information (2023)
| Name | Hometown | School | Height | Weight | Commit date |
|---|---|---|---|---|---|
| Kordelius Jefferson; CG | Arlington, TX | Martin High School | 6 ft 3 in (1.91 m) | 180 lb (82 kg) | May 16, 2022 |
| Kordelius Jefferson; CG | Recruit ratings: Rivals: 247Sports: (79) | | | | |
| Joseph Tugler; PF / C | Houston, TX | Cypress Falls High School | 6 ft 7 in (2.01 m) | 215 lb (98 kg) | May 25, 2022 |
| Joseph Tugler; PF / C | Recruit ratings: Rivals: 247Sports: (83) | | | | |
| Jacob McFarland; C | Moreno Valley, CA | Rancho Verde High School | 6 ft 10 in (2.08 m) | 205 lb (93 kg) | Sep 23, 2022 |
| Jacob McFarland; C | Recruit ratings: Rivals: 247Sports: (82) | | | | |
| Cedric Lath; C | Abidjan, Ivory Coast | Balboa School (CA) | 6 ft 10 in (2.08 m) | 235 lb (107 kg) | Nov 16, 2022 |
| Cedric Lath; C | Recruit ratings: 247Sports: | | | | |
Overall recruit ranking: 247Sports: 23
Note: In many cases, Scout, Rivals, 247Sports, On3, and ESPN may conflict in their listings of height and weight.; In these cases, the average was taken. ESPN grades are on a 100-point scale.; Sources: "2023 Team Ranking". Rivals.

== Preseason ==
=== AAC preseason media poll ===
On October 12, The American released the preseason poll and other preseason awards.

Coaches Poll
| Predicted finish | Team | Votes (1st place) |
| 1 | Houston | 100 (10) |
| 2 | Memphis | 87 (1) |
| 3 | Cincinnati | 82 |
| 4 | Tulane | 74 |
| 5 | Temple | 66 |
| 6 | UCF | 51 |
| 7 | SMU | 43 |
| 8 | Wichita State | 35 |
| 9 | South Florida | 33 |
| 10 | Tulsa | 21 |
| 11 | East Carolina | 13 |

=== Preseason awards ===
- Player of the Year – Marcus Sasser
- Rookie of the Year – Jarace Walker
- All-AAC First Team – Marcus Sasser
- All-AAC Second Team – Jamal Shead

== Roster ==
2022–23 Houston Cougars men's basketball team
Players
Coaches

| Pos. | # | Name | Height | Weight | Year | Previous school | Hometown |
|---|---|---|---|---|---|---|---|
| G | 0 | Marcus Sasser | 6 ft 2 in (1.88 m) | 195 lb (88 kg) | Sr | Red Oak HS | Dallas, TX |
| G | 1 | Jamal Shead | 6 ft 1 in (1.85 m) | 195 lb (88 kg) | Jr | Manor HS | Manor, TX |
| G | 3 | Ramon Walker Jr. | 6 ft 4 in (1.93 m) | 210 lb (95 kg) | So | Shadow Creek HS | Pearland, TX |
| C | 4 | Darius Bowser | 6 ft 9 in (2.06 m) | 250 lb (113 kg) | GS | Charleston Southern | Gaffney, SC |
| F | 5 | Ja'Vier Francis | 6 ft 8 in (2.03 m) | 235 lb (107 kg) | So | Montverde Academy | New Orleans, LA |
| G | 12 | Tramon Mark | 6 ft 5 in (1.96 m) | 195 lb (88 kg) | RS So | Dickinson HS | Dickinson, TX |
| F | 13 | J'Wan Roberts | 6 ft 7 in (2.01 m) | 230 lb (104 kg) | RS Jr | Shoemaker HS | Saint Thomas, USVI |
| G | 20 | Ryan Elvin (W) | 6 ft 1 in (1.85 m) | 170 lb (77 kg) | Jr | Cedar Ridge HS | Round Rock, TX |
| G | 21 | Emanuel Sharp | 6 ft 3 in (1.91 m) | 205 lb (93 kg) | RS Fr | Bishop McLaughlin CHS | Tampa, FL |
| G | 23 | Terrance Arceneaux | 6 ft 5 in (1.96 m) | 195 lb (88 kg) | Fr | Beaumont United HS | Beaumont, TX |
| G | 24 | Mylik Wilson (redshirt) | 6 ft 2 in (1.88 m) | 175 lb (79 kg) | Sr | Texas Tech | Rayville, LA |
| F | 25 | Jarace Walker | 6 ft 8 in (2.03 m) | 240 lb (109 kg) | Fr | IMG Academy | New Freedom, PA |
| F | 32 | Reggie Chaney | 6 ft 8 in (2.03 m) | 230 lb (104 kg) | GS | Arkansas | Tulsa, OK |

Head coach

- Kelvin Sampson (UNC Pembroke)

Assistant coach(es)

- K.C. Beard (Boise State)
- Hollis Price (Oklahoma)
- Kellen Sampson (Oklahoma)
- Quannas White (Oklahoma)

Legend

- (C) Team captain
- (S) Suspended
- (I) Ineligible
- (W) Walk-on
- Injured
- Current redshirt

Roster
Last update: March 30, 2024

== Schedule and results ==
| Date time, TV | Rank^{#} | Opponent^{#} | Result | Record | High points | High rebounds | High assists | Site (attendance) city, state |
Non-conference regular season
| November 7, 2022*; 7:00 p.m., ESPN+ | No. 3 | Northern Colorado | W 83–36 | 1–0 | 21 – Sasser | 12 – J. Walker | 9 – Shead | Fertitta Center (7,042); Houston, TX |
| November 11, 2022*; 5:00 p.m., CBSSN | No. 3 | vs. Saint Joseph's; Veterans Classic | W 81–55 | 2–0 | 23 – J. Walker | 12 – Roberts | 8 – Shead | Alumni Hall (2,889); Annapolis, MD |
| November 14, 2022*; 7:00 p.m., ESPN+ | No. 3 | Oral Roberts; Cougar Classic | W 83–45 | 3–0 | 23 – Mark | 11 – Francis | 3 – Shead | Fertitta Center (7,246); Houston, TX |
| November 16, 2022*; 7:00 p.m., ESPN+ | No. 3 | Texas Southern; Cougar Classic | W 83–48 | 4–0 | 20 – Sasser | 6 – J. Walker | 6 – tied | Fertitta Center (7,322); Houston, TX |
| November 20, 2022*; 8:30 p.m., ESPN | No. 3 | at Oregon | W 66–56 | 5–0 | 16 – Sasser | 6 – J. Walker | 4 – Shead | Matthew Knight Arena (7,002); Eugene, OR |
| November 26, 2022*; 1:30 p.m., ESPN+ | No. 2 | Kent State | W 49–44 | 6–0 | 19 – Sasser | 14 – Roberts | 3 – Mark | Fertitta Center (7,378); Houston, TX |
| November 29, 2022*; 7:00 p.m., ESPN+ | No. 1 | Norfolk State | W 100–52 | 7–0 | 25 – Sasser | 8 – tied | 11 – Shead | Fertitta Center (7,308); Houston, TX |
| December 3, 2022*; 8:30 p.m., ESPN2 | No. 1 | vs. Saint Mary's; The Battleground 2k22 | W 53–48 | 8–0 | 15 – Roberts | 8 – Roberts | 4 – Sasser | Dickies Arena (2,812); Fort Worth, TX |
| December 6, 2022*; 7:00 p.m., ESPN+ | No. 1 | North Florida | W 76–42 | 9–0 | 14 – Francis | 10 – J. Walker | 10 – Shead | Fertitta Center (7,283); Houston, TX |
| December 10, 2022*; 2:00 p.m., ABC | No. 1 | No. 8 Alabama | L 65–71 | 9–1 | 19 – Shead | 9 – Roberts | 3 – Shead | Fertitta Center (7,718); Houston, TX |
| December 13, 2022*; 7:00 p.m., ESPN+ | No. 5 | North Carolina A&T | W 74–46 | 10–1 | 17 – tied | 15 – Francis | 4 – Shead | Fertitta Center (7,268); Houston, TX |
| December 17, 2022*; 1:00 p.m., ESPN2 | No. 5 | at No. 2 Virginia | W 69–61 | 11–1 | 17 – J. Walker | 7 – J. Walker | 4 – tied | John Paul Jones Arena (14,629); Charlottesville, VA |
| December 21, 2022*; 7:00 p.m., ESPN+ | No. 3 | McNeese | W 83–44 | 12–1 | 23 – Francis | 13 – Francis | 9 – Shead | Fertitta Center (7,418); Houston, TX |
AAC Regular Season
| December 28, 2022; 8:00 p.m., ESPNU | No. 3 | at Tulsa | W 89–50 | 13–1 (1–0) | 15 – Roberts | 9 – Roberts | 5 – Sasser | Reynolds Center (4,807); Tulsa, OK |
| December 31, 2022; 1:00 p.m., ESPN+ | No. 3 | UCF | W 71–65 | 14–1 (2–0) | 19 – Mark | 7 – Francis | 4 – Shead | Fertitta Center (7,457); Houston, TX |
| January 5, 2023; 6:00 p.m., ESPN2 | No. 2 | SMU; Rivalry | W 87–53 | 15–1 (3–0) | 23 – J. Walker | 10 – J. Walker | 7 – Sasser | Fertitta Center (7,478); Houston, TX |
| January 8, 2023; 2:00 p.m., ESPN | No. 2 | at Cincinnati | W 72–59 | 16–1 (4–0) | 21 – J. Walker | 11 – Roberts | 5 – Mark | Fifth Third Arena (10,264); Cincinnati, OH |
| January 11, 2023; 7:00 p.m., ESPN+ | No. 1 | South Florida | W 83–77 | 17–1 (5–0) | 31 – Sasser | 6 – tied | 4 – Sasser | Fertitta Center (7,473); Houston, TX |
| January 17, 2023; 6:00 p.m., ESPN+ | No. 1 | at Tulane | W 80–60 | 18–1 (6–0) | 23 – Sasser | 9 – J. Walker | 7 – Shead | Devlin Fieldhouse (3,621); New Orleans, LA |
| January 22, 2023; 2:00 p.m., ESPN | No. 1 | Temple | L 55–56 | 18–2 (6–1) | 13 – Shead | 12 – J. Walker | 5 – Sasser | Fertitta Center (7,484); Houston, TX |
| January 25, 2023; 6:00 p.m., ESPN+ | No. 3 | at UCF | W 82–71 | 19–2 (7–1) | 18 – Sharp | 9 – Roberts | 10 – Shead | Addition Financial Arena (9,383); Orlando, FL |
| January 28, 2023; 1:15 p.m., CBS | No. 3 | Cincinnati | W 75–69 | 20–2 (8–1) | 25 – J. Walker | 7 – J. Walker | 5 – Shead | Fertitta Center (7,477); Houston, TX |
| February 2, 2023; 8:00 p.m., ESPN2 | No. 3 | at Wichita State | W 70–61 | 21–2 (9–1) | 15 – tied | 6 – tied | 7 – Shead | Charles Koch Arena (7,274); Wichita, KS |
| February 5, 2023; 5:00 p.m., ESPN2 | No. 3 | at Temple | W 81–65 | 22–2 (10–1) | 23 – J. Walker | 6 – J. Walker | 7 – Shead | Liacouras Center (10,206); Philadelphia, PA |
| February 8, 2023; 7:00 p.m., ESPN+ | No. 2 | Tulsa | W 80–42 | 23–2 (11–1) | 25 – Sasser | 10 – Roberts | 12 – Shead | Fertitta Center (7,369); Houston, TX |
| February 16, 2023; 6:00 p.m., ESPN2 | No. 2 | at SMU; Rivalry | W 80–65 | 24–2 (12–1) | 20 – Sasser | 10 – Roberts | 8 – Shead | Moody Coliseum (6,278); University Park, TX |
| February 19, 2023; 2:00 p.m., ESPN | No. 2 | Memphis | W 72–64 | 25–2 (13–1) | 20 – tied | 12 – Roberts | 3 – J. Walker | Fertitta Center (7,730); Houston, TX |
| February 22, 2023; 8:00 p.m., ESPNU | No. 1 | Tulane | W 89–59 | 26–2 (14–1) | 26 – Roberts | 13 – J. Walker | 6 – tied | Fertitta Center (7,763); Houston, TX |
| February 25, 2023; 7:00 p.m., ESPN2 | No. 1 | at East Carolina | W 76–57 | 27–2 (15–1) | 22 – Sasser | 12 – Roberts | 3 – tied | Williams Arena (7,589); Greenville, NC |
| March 2, 2023; 6:00 p.m., ESPN2 | No. 1 | Wichita State | W 83–66 | 28–2 (16–1) | 25 – Shead | 9 – J. Walker | 4 – tied | Fertitta Center (7,879); Houston, TX |
| March 5, 2023; 11:00 a.m., CBS | No. 1 | at Memphis | W 67–65 | 29–2 (17–1) | 16 – tied | 8 – Mark | 7 – Shead | FedExForum (18,437); Memphis, TN |
AAC tournament
| March 10, 2023; 12:00 p.m., ESPN2 | (1) No. 1 | vs. (9) East Carolina; Quarterfinals | W 60–46 | 30–2 | 30 – Sasser | 12 – Roberts | 4 – tied | Dickies Arena; Fort Worth, TX |
| March 11, 2023; 2:00 p.m., ESPN2 | (1) No. 1 | vs. (4) Cincinnati; Semifinals | W 69–48 | 31–2 | 16 – tied | 8 – tied | 9 – Shead | Dickies Arena; Fort Worth, TX |
| March 12, 2023; 2:15 p.m., ESPN | (1) No. 1 | vs. (2) Memphis; Championship | L 65–75 | 31–3 | 16 – Shead | 20 – Roberts | 4 – Shead | Dickies Arena; Fort Worth, TX |
NCAA tournament
| March 16, 2023*; 8:20 p.m., TNT | (1 MW) No. 2 | vs. (16 MW) Northern Kentucky; First Round | W 63–52 | 32–3 | 16 – J. Walker | 12 – Roberts | 6 – Shead | Legacy Arena (15,154); Birmingham, AL |
| March 18, 2023*; 6:10 p.m., TBS | (1 MW) No. 2 | vs. (9 MW) Auburn; Second Round | W 81–64 | 33–3 | 26 – Mark | 10 – J. Walker | 5 – Shead | Legacy Arena (15,198); Birmingham, AL |
| March 24, 2023*; 6:15 p.m., CBS | (1 MW) No. 2 | vs. (5 MW) No. 16 Miami (FL); Sweet Sixteen | L 75–89 | 33–4 | 16 – J. Walker | 11 – J. Walker | 5 – tied | T-Mobile Center (17,429); Kansas City, MO |
*Non-conference game. ^{#}Rankings from AP poll. (#) Tournament seedings in parentheses. All times are in Central Time.

== Rankings ==
Ranking movements Legend: ██ Increase in ranking ██ Decrease in ranking ( ) = First-place votes
| | Week | | | | | | | | | | | | | | | | | | | |
| Poll | Pre | 1 | 2 | 3 | 4 | 5 | 6 | 7 | 8 | 9 | 10 | 11 | 12 | 13 | 14 | 15 | 16 | 17 | 18 | Final |
|---|---|---|---|---|---|---|---|---|---|---|---|---|---|---|---|---|---|---|---|---|
| AP | 3 (1) | 3 (2) | 2 (9) | 1 (45) | 1 (37) | 5 | 3 | 3 | 2 | 1 (34) | 1 (34) | 3 | 3 | 2 (22) | 2 (22) | 1 (48) | 1 (49) | 1 (58) | 2 (9) | Not released |
| Coaches | 3 (1) | 3 (2) | 2 (7) | 1 (23) | 1 (21) | 4 | 3 | 3 | 2 (2) | 1 (14) | 1 (17) | 3 | 3 | 2 (13) | 2 (15) | 1 (24) | 1 (27) | 1 (29) | 1 (21) | 6 |

*AP does not release post-NCAA tournament rankings.

== Awards and honors ==
=== All-American ===
- Marcus Sasser – AP (1st), USBWA (1st), NABC (1st), SN (2nd)

=== Jerry West Award ===
- Marcus Sasser

=== American Athletic Conference honors ===
==== All-AAC Awards ====
- Player of the Year: Marcus Sasser
- Coach of the Year: Kelvin Sampson
- Freshman of the Year: Jarace Walker
- Defensive Player of the Year: Jamal Shead
- Most Improved Player: J'Wan Roberts
- Sixth Man of the Year: Reggie Chaney

==== All-AAC First Team ====
- Marcus Sasser

==== All-AAC Second Team ====
- Jamal Shead
- J'Wan Roberts
- Jarace Walker

==== All-Freshman Team ====
- Jarace Walker
- Terrance Arceneaux
- Emanuel Sharp
