= Zemaiah Vaughn =

American football player (born 2002)

No. 5 – Minnesota Vikings
- Position: Cornerback
- Roster status: Active

Personal information
- Born: April 2, 2002 (age 24); Beaumont, Texas, U.S.
- Listed height: 6 ft 3 in (1.91 m)
- Listed weight: 180 lb (82 kg)

Career information
- High school: Beaumont (TX)
- College: Utah (2020–2024)
- NFL draft: 2025: undrafted

Career history
- Minnesota Vikings (2025–present)

Career NFL statistics as of Week 10, 2026
- Total tackles: 1
- Stats at Pro Football Reference

Zemaiah Vaughn (born April 2, 2002) is an American professional football cornerback for the Minnesota Vikings of the National Football League (NFL). He played college football for the Utah Utes.

== Early life ==
Vaughn attended Beaumont United High School in Beaumont, Texas, where he played quarterback. As a senior, he had 854 passing yards with eight touchdowns and 1,049 rushing yards. He originally committed to play college football at Lamar University before switching to the University of Utah.

== College career ==
Vaughn played in four games his first year at Utah in 2020 and had one interception. In 2021, he played in 13 games with four starts and recorded 24 tackles. In 2022, he had seven starts in 14 games and finished with 25 tackles. Vaughn started all 13 games in 2023, recording 53 tackles and one interception. He returned to Utah for the 2024 season.

== Professional career ==
Pre-draft measurables
Height	Weight	Arm length	Hand span	Wingspan	40-yard dash	10-yard split	20-yard split	20-yard shuttle	Three-cone drill	Vertical jump	Broad jump
6 ft 2 1/2 in (1.89 m)	186 lb (84 kg)	32 in (0.81 m)	8 1/2 in (0.22 m)	6 ft 8 in (2.03 m)	4.45 s	1.55 s	2.57 s	4.37 s	7.31 s	39.5 in (1.00 m)	10 ft 9 in (3.28 m)
All values from Pro Day

Vaughn signed with the Minnesota Vikings as an undrafted free agent on April 26, 2025. He was waived on August 26 as part of final roster cuts. Vaughn was re-signed to the team's practice squad the next day. He was promoted to the active roster on December 29.
