= Terrance Arceneaux =

American basketball player

No. 23 – George Washington Revolutionaries
- Position: Shooting guard
- League: Atlantic 10 Conference

Personal information
- Born: November 13, 2003 (age 22) Beaumont, Texas, U.S.
- Listed height: 6 ft 6 in (1.98 m)
- Listed weight: 200 lb (91 kg)

Career information
- High school: Beaumont United (Beaumont, Texas)
- College: Houston (2022–2025); NC State (2025–2026); George Washington (2026–present)

Career highlights
- AAC All-Freshman Team (2023)

Terrance James Arceneaux (born November 13, 2003) is an American college basketball player for the George Washington Revolutionaries of the Atlantic 10 Conference. He previously played for the Houston Cougars and NC State Wolfpack.

== Early life and high school career ==
Arceneaux grew up in Beaumont, Texas and attended Beaumont United High School. He averaged 20.9 points, 7.7 rebounds, and four blocks per game during his junior season as Beaumont United won the Class 5A state championship. As a senior, Arceneaux averaged 15.1 points, 7.6 rebounds, two assists, 3.2 blocks, and 2.2 steals per game as Beaumont United repeated as state champions. He also played in the Iverson Classic during the season. Arceneaux was rated a four-star recruit and committed to playing college basketball for Houston over offers from Oklahoma, Texas A&M, and UNLV.

== College career ==
Arceneaux served as a key reserve during his freshman season at Houston. He was named to the American Athletic Conference (AAC) All-Freshman team at the end of the regular season. Arceneaux made his first career start in the 2023 American Athletic Conference tournament championship, replacing injured starter Marcus Sasser and scoring nine points in a 75–65 loss to Memphis. After a promising start to his sophomore season, Arceneaux suffered a season-ending achilles injury after just 11 games. In his redshirt sophomore season, he averaged 6.5 points, 2.7 rebounds and 0.7 assists per game. Arceneaux transferred to NC State after the season. He averaged 3.8 points, 2.6 rebounds and 0.5 assists per game for the Wolfpack. Following the season Arceneaux transferred to George Washington.

== Career statistics ==
Legend
GP	Games played	GS	Games started	MPG	Minutes per game
FG%	Field goal percentage	3P%	3-point field goal percentage	FT%	Free throw percentage
RPG	Rebounds per game	APG	Assists per game	SPG	Steals per game
BPG	Blocks per game	PPG	Points per game	**Bold**	Career high

=== College ===
Year	Team	GP	GS	MPG	FG%	3P%	FT%	RPG	APG	SPG	BPG	PPG
2022–23	Houston	34	1	13.9	.368	.250	.526	2.5	.6	.6	.1	3.7
2023–24	Houston	11	0	18.3	.386	.286	.526	**4.5**	**.7**	**.9**	**.5**	5.5
2024–25	Houston	**40**	**6**	**20.3**	**.443**	**.337**	**.729**	2.7	**.7**	**.9**	.3	**6.5**
Career		85	7	17.5	.411	.297	.640	2.9	.7	.8	.3	5.2
