= 2025–26 Louisiana Ragin' Cajuns men's basketball team =

American college basketball season

2025–26 Louisiana Ragin' Cajuns men's basketball
- Conference: Sun Belt Conference
- Record: 11–22 (7–11 Sun Belt)
- Head coach: Quannas White (1st season)
- Assistant coaches: Brandon Espinosa; Donald Reyes; Josh White; Giovonne Woods
- Home arena: Cajundome

2025–26 Sun Belt Conference men's basketball standings
	Conf.				Overall
Team	W		L	PCT	W		L	PCT
Troy	12	–	6	.667	20	–	11	.645
Marshall	11	–	7	.611	19	–	12	.613
Coastal Carolina	11	–	7	.611	19	–	12	.613
Appalachian State	11	–	7	.611	19	–	12	.613
Texas State	11	–	7	.611	19	–	12	.613
South Alabama	11	–	7	.611	21	–	10	.677
Arkansas State	11	–	7	.611	20	–	11	.645
Southern Miss	9	–	9	.500	16	–	15	.516
James Madison	9	–	9	.500	17	–	14	.548
Georgia Southern	8	–	10	.444	16	–	15	.516
Old Dominion	7	–	11	.389	12	–	20	.375
Louisiana	7	–	11	.389	11	–	21	.344
Georgia State	7	–	11	.389	10	–	22	.313
Louisiana–Monroe	1	–	17	.056	4	–	28	.125
† 2026 Sun Belt tournament winner As of March 3, 2026

The 2025–26 Louisiana Ragin' Cajuns men's basketball team represented the University of Louisiana at Lafayette during the 2025–26 NCAA Division I men's basketball season. The Ragin' Cajuns, led by first year head coach Quannas White, played their home games at the Cajundome as members of the Sun Belt Conference.

== Previous season ==
The Ragin' Cajuns finished the 2024–25 season 12–21, 8–10 in Sun Belt play to finish in a tie for eighth place. As the No. 11 seed in the Sun Belt tournament, they defeated Louisiana–Monroe in the first round, before losing to Old Dominion in the second round.

== Preseason ==
=== Preseason Sun Belt Conference poll ===
The Ragin' Cajuns were picked to finish in ninth place in the conference's preseason poll.

Coaches poll
Predicted finish	Team (1st place Votes)
1	James Madison - 175 (1)
2	Arkansas State - 154 (3)
3	South Alabama - 152 (4)
4	Troy - 148 (1)
5	Old Dominion - 145 (2)
6	Marshall - 128 (1)
7	App State - 123 (1)
8	Texas State - 106
9	Louisiana - 95 (1)
10	Georgia Southern - 66
11	Georgia State - 59
12	Southern Miss - 57
13	Coastal Carolina - 43
14	ULM - 19

== Roster ==
2025–26 Louisiana Ragin' Cajuns men's basketball team
Players
Coaches

Pos.	#	Name	Height	Weight	Year	Previous school	Hometown
F	0	Jeremiah Evans	6 ft 10 in (2.08 m)	210 lb (95 kg)	So	Southwood HS	Shreveport, LA
F	1	Zeke Cook	6 ft 6 in (1.98 m)	220 lb (100 kg)	GS	Starkville HS; Jackson State	Pheba, MS
F	2	Todd Jones	6 ft 9 in (2.06 m)	205 lb (93 kg)	So	Isidore Newman HS; Portland	New Orleans, LA
G	3	Dorian Finister	6 ft 5 in (1.96 m)	185 lb (84 kg)	Jr	Carver HS; Sam Houston	New Orleans, LA
F	4	Dariyus Woodson	6 ft 7 in (2.01 m)	220 lb (100 kg)	Sr	Goose Creek Memorial HS; North Dakota	Baytown, TX
F	5	Joshua Lewis	6 ft 7 in (2.01 m)	185 lb (84 kg)	Fr	Howard W. Blake HS	Tampa, FL
G	6	De'Vion Lavergne	6 ft 3 in (1.91 m)	170 lb (77 kg)	RS So	North Central HS; Purdue Fort Wayne	Melville, LA
G	7	Michael Collins	6 ft 1 in (1.85 m)	170 lb (77 kg)	Fr	Shadow Creek HS	Pearland, TX
G	8	Karris Bilal	6 ft 3 in (1.91 m)	190 lb (86 kg)	RS Fr	Riverwood International Charter; Vanderbilt	Atlanta, GA
G	10	Jaxon Olvera	6 ft 5 in (1.96 m)	190 lb (86 kg)	So	Golden State Prep; Pepperdine	Houston, TX
G	12	Michael Mouton	6 ft 4 in (1.93 m)	195 lb (88 kg)	So	St. Thomas More HS	Lafayette, LA
G	13	Christian Landry	6 ft 5 in (1.96 m)	190 lb (86 kg)	RS Jr	St. Thomas More HS; LSU Eunice	Lafayette, LA
G	14	Jamyron Keller	6 ft 3 in (1.91 m)	210 lb (95 kg)	Jr	Ellison HS	St. Matthews, SC
G	22	Logan Myers	6 ft 3 in (1.91 m)	170 lb (77 kg)	Fr	Teurlings Catholic HS	Lafayette, LA
F	23	Kyran Ratliff	6 ft 8 in (2.03 m)	205 lb (93 kg)	RS Jr	Booker T. Washington HS; Shaun Dumas Academy	New Orleans, LA
G	24	Milan Mejia (5Y)	6 ft 2 in (1.88 m)	185 lb (84 kg)	Sr	Louisiana State University Laboratory School; Loyola (New Orleans)	Baton Rouge, LA
F	33	Sean Elkinton	6 ft 8 in (2.03 m)	235 lb (107 kg)	Sr	Crosby HS; Louisiana Tech	Crosby, TX
F		Rahman Olajuwon	6 ft 8 in (2.03 m)	195 lb (88 kg)	RS So	Clements HS; Tyler JC	Houston, TX

Head coach

- Quannas White (Oklahoma)

Assistant coach(es)

- Brandon Espinosa (Dallas Christian)
- Donald Reyes (LSU)
- Josh White (North Texas)
- Giovonne Woods (Central Washington)

Legend

- (C) Team captain
- (S) Suspended
- (I) Ineligible
- (W) Walk-on
- Injured
- Current redshirt

Roster
Last update: November 6, 2025

== Schedule and results ==
Date time, TV	Rank^{#}	Opponent^{#}	Result	Record	High points	High rebounds	High assists	Site (attendance) city, state
Regular season
November 3, 2025*; 6:00 pm, ESPN+		at Ball State; MAC-SBC Challenge	L 64–75	0–1	21 – Keller	6 – Olvera	4 – Tied	Worthen Arena (2,582); Muncie, IN
November 7, 2025*; 7:30 pm, ESPN+		Southeastern Louisiana	W 58–52	1–1	20 – Olvera	6 – Lavergne	2 – Tied	Cajundome (3,304); Lafayette, LA
November 11, 2025*; 7:00 pm, ESPN+		Tulane	L 62–66	1–2	19 – Olvera	7 – Lavergne	3 – Tied	Cajundome (3,047); Lafayette, LA
November 14, 2025*; 6:00 pm, ESPN+		at McNeese	L 62–88	1–3	25 – Finister	7 – Olvera	2 – Tied	Townsley Law Arena (4,333); Lake Charles, LA
November 18, 2025*; 9:00 pm, ACCNX		at Stanford; Acrisure Series campus-site game	L 66–93	1–4	16 – Lewis	6 – Finister	2 – Woodson	Maples Pavilion (2,266); Stanford, CA
November 21, 2025*; 9:00 pm, ESPN+		at Santa Clara; Acrisure Series campus-site game	L 43–80	1–5	16 – Finister	5 – Tied	2 – Tied	Leavey Center (1,331); Santa Clara, CA
November 24, 2025*; 8:00 pm, ESPN+		at UC Davis; Acrisure Series campus-site game	L 56–77	1–6	11 – Lewis	5 – Tied	4 – Olvera	University Credit Union Center (1,316); Davis, CA
November 28, 2025*; 7:00 pm, ESPN+		Jackson State	L 45–51	1–7	13 – Woodson	10 – Lewis	2 – Tied	Cajundome (2,704); Lafayette, LA
December 3, 2025*; 6:00 pm, ESPN+		at Lamar	L 55–65	1–8	11 – Olvera	6 – Tied	3 – Collins	Montagne Center (1,499); Beaumont, TX
December 6, 2025*; 3:00 pm, ESPN+		UNC Wilmington	L 63–70	1–9	21 – Olvera	6 – Jones Jr.	4 – Olvera	Cajundome (2,382); Lafayette, LA
December 13, 2025*; 2:00 pm, ESPN+		at Louisiana Tech	L 44–65	1–10	14 – Finister	8 – Jones Jr.	3 – Tied	Thomas Assembly Center (2,320); Ruston, LA
December 18, 2025; 7:30 pm, ESPN+		at Southern Miss	L 54–62	1–11 (0–1)	20 – Finister	7 – Tied	1 – Tied	Reed Green Coliseum (2,606); Hattiesburg, MS
December 20, 2025; 2:00 pm, ESPN+		at Louisiana–Monroe	W 76–62	2–11 (1–1)	17 – Olvera	8 – Tied	7 – Finister	Fant–Ewing Coliseum (1,347); Monroe, LA
December 28, 2025*; 2:00 pm, ESPN+		Norfolk State	W 63–54	3–11	15 – Finister	9 – Finister	8 – Lavergne	Cajundome (2,454); Lafayette, LA
December 31, 2025; 12:00 pm, ESPN+		South Alabama	L 58–63	3–12 (1–2)	18 – Olvera	6 – Tied	7 – Olvera	Cajundome (2,337); Lafayette, LA
January 3, 2026; 12:00 pm, ESPN+		Southern Miss	L 67–74	3–13 (1–3)	18 – Lavergne	6 – Finister	3 – Lavergne	Cajundome (2,434); Lafayette, LA
January 8, 2026; 7:30 pm, ESPN+		Louisiana–Monroe	W 85–79	4–13 (2–3)	26 – Lewis	9 – Lewis	4 – Finister	Cajundome (2,341); Lafayette, LA
January 10, 2026; 12:00 pm, ESPN+		Troy	L 70–90	4–14 (2–4)	25 – Finister	3 – Woodson	3 – Lavergne	Cajundome (2,318); Lafayette, LA
January 14, 2026; 7:00 pm, ESPN+		at Texas State	L 54–59	4–15 (2–5)	18 – Finister	6 – Jones Jr.	2 – Tied	Strahan Arena (1,103); San Marcos, TX
January 17, 2026; 3:00 pm, ESPN+		at South Alabama	W 59–56	5–15 (3–5)	14 – Olvera	9 – Jones Jr.	5 – Tied	Mitchell Center (2,617); Mobile, AL
January 22, 2026; 5:30 pm, ESPN+		at Appalachian State	L 58–72	5–16 (3–6)	16 – Finister	7 – Jones Jr.	7 – Lavergne	Holmes Center (791); Boone, NC
January 29, 2026; 7:00 pm, ESPN+		Georgia State	W 82–72	6–16 (4–6)	23 – Lavergne	7 – Olvera	7 – Lavergne	Cajundome (2,436); Lafayette, LA
January 31, 2026; 3:00 pm, ESPN+		Georgia Southern	W 69–60	7–16 (5–6)	17 – Lavergne	7 – Olvera	3 – Tied	Cajundome (2,423); Lafayette, LA
February 4, 2026; 6:00 pm, ESPN+		at James Madison	W 64–61	8–16 (6–6)	18 – Finister	8 – Jones Jr.	4 – Olvera	Atlantic Union Bank Center (4,140); Harrisonburg, VA
February 7, 2026*; 2:00 pm, ESPN+		Central Michigan; MAC-SBC Challenge	W 85–80	9–16	19 – Lavergne	7 – Jones Jr.	8 – Finister	Cajundome (3,148); Lafayette, LA
February 12, 2026; 7:00 pm, ESPN+		Coastal Carolina	L 65–69	9–17 (6–7)	19 – Tied	7 – Finister	3 – Lavergne	Cajundome (2,516); Lafayette, LA
February 16, 2026; 4:00 pm, ESPN+		at Old Dominion	L 72–83	9–18 (6–8)	23 – Olvera	7 – Lavergne	3 – Lavergne	Chartway Arena (6,058); Norfolk, VA
February 19, 2026; 7:00 pm, ESPN+		Arkansas State	L 62–79	9–19 (6–9)	18 – Tied	6 – Bilal	3 – Lavergne	Cajundome (2,552); Lafayette, LA
February 21, 2026; 12:00 pm, ESPN+		Texas State	W 67–54	10–19 (7–9)	20 – Olvera	8 – Jones Jr.	5 – Finister	Cajundome (2,484); Lafayette, LA
February 24, 2026; 6:00 pm, ESPN+		at Troy	L 59–78	10–20 (7–10)	19 – Olvera	5 – Olvera	6 – Collins	Trojan Arena (3,035); Troy, AL
February 27, 2026; 7:30 pm, ESPN+		at Arkansas State	L 58–81	10–21 (7–11)	15 – Bilal	14 – Olvera	4 – Lavergne	First National Bank Arena (5,074); Jonesboro, AR
Sun Belt tournament
March 3, 2026; 5:00 pm, ESPN+	(12)	vs. (13) Georgia State; First round	W 84–75	11–21	29 – Olvera	9 – Olvera	5 – Lavergne	Pensacola Bay Center; Pensacola, FL
March 4, 2026; 5:00 pm, ESPN+	(12)	vs. (9) James Madison; Second round	L 72–87	11–22	28 – Olvera	8 – Olvera	1 – Tied	Pensacola Bay Center (824); Pensacola, FL
*Non-conference game. ^{#}Rankings from AP Poll. (#) Tournament seedings in parentheses. All times are in Central.
