= 2025–26 Appalachian State Mountaineers men's basketball team =

American college basketball season

2025–26 Appalachian State Mountaineers men's basketball
- Conference: Sun Belt Conference
- Record: 19–13 (11–7 Sun Belt)
- Head coach: Dustin Kerns (7th season)
- Associate head coach: Bob Szorc
- Assistant coaches: Tanner Smith; Tim Johnson; Raheem Martin; Bradley Fey
- Home arena: Holmes Center

2025–26 Sun Belt Conference men's basketball standings
	Conf.				Overall
Team	W		L	PCT	W		L	PCT
Troy †	12	–	6	.667	22	–	12	.647
Marshall	11	–	7	.611	19	–	13	.594
Coastal Carolina	11	–	7	.611	19	–	13	.594
Appalachian State	11	–	7	.611	19	–	13	.594
Texas State	11	–	7	.611	19	–	13	.594
South Alabama	11	–	7	.611	21	–	12	.636
Arkansas State	11	–	7	.611	20	–	12	.625
Southern Miss	9	–	9	.500	19	–	16	.543
James Madison	9	–	9	.500	18	–	15	.545
Georgia Southern	8	–	10	.444	21	–	16	.568
Old Dominion	7	–	11	.389	12	–	21	.364
Louisiana	7	–	11	.389	11	–	22	.333
Georgia State	7	–	11	.389	10	–	22	.313
Louisiana–Monroe	1	–	17	.056	4	–	28	.125
† 2026 Sun Belt tournament winner

The 2025–26 Appalachian State Mountaineers men's basketball team represented Appalachian State University in the 2025–26 NCAA Division I men's basketball season. The Mountaineers, led by seventh-year head coach Dustin Kerns, played their home games at the Holmes Center in Boone, North Carolina as members of the Sun Belt Conference.

== Previous season ==
The Mountaineers finished the 2024–25 season 17–14, 10–8 in Sun Belt play. The Mountaineers lost to Old Dominion in the first round of the Sun Belt tournament.

== Off season ==
=== Departures ===
Name	Number	Pos.	Height	Weight	Year	Hometown	Reason for departure
Anthony Alston	8	G	6'3"	180	Freshman	Fayetteville, NC	Transferred to Hutchinson
Jalil Beauburn	7	G	6'9"	189	Senior	Miramar, FL	Graduated
Will Coble	20	G	6'4"	183	GS Senior	Charlotte, NC	Graduated
Dior Conners	4	G	6'3"	183	Junior	Columbus, OH	Transferred to Ohio
Ben Ezeagu	6	F	6'9"	210	Junior	Toronto, ON	Transferred to Southern Indiana
C. J. Huntley	15	F	6'10"	185	GS Senior	Huntersville, NC	Graduated, signed a two-way contract with the Phoenix Suns
Jonah Long	13	G	6'4"	190	Freshman	Hickory, NC	
Jamil Muttilib	10	G	6'6"	189	Junior	Toronto, ON	Transferred to Grambling State
Jackson Threadgill	0	G	6'6"	200	GS Senior	Concord, NC	Graduated

=== Incoming transfers ===
Name	Number	Pos.	Height	Weight	Year	Hometown	Previous School
Eren Banks	4	G	6'3"	190	Junior	Eatonton, GA	Georgia Southern
Kasen Jennings	13	G	6'5"	210	GS Senior	Atlanta, GA	South Florida
Chad Moodie	23	F	6'8"	225	Junior	Grayson, GA	Alabama A&M
Jalen Tot	9	G	6'1"	170	GS Senior	Dallas, TX	Montana State Billings
KJ Vasser	0	G	6'1"	180	Junior	Chicago, IL	Moberly Area

=== 2025 recruiting class ===
College recruiting information
Name	Hometown	School	Height	Weight	Commit date
Jacari Brim; G	Winston-Salem, NC	West Forsyth	6 ft 2 in (1.88 m)	190 lb (86 kg)	
Jacari Brim; G	Recruit ratings: (NR)				
Grant Clayton; F	Asheville, NC	A.C. Reynolds	6 ft 7 in (2.01 m)	220 lb (100 kg)	
Grant Clayton; F	Recruit ratings: (NR)				
Tre McKinnon; G	Wilmington, NC	Lake Norman	6 ft 5 in (1.96 m)	177 lb (80 kg)	
Tre McKinnon; G	Recruit ratings: (NR)				
Ted Neal; G	Greensboro, GA	Newton	6 ft 7 in (2.01 m)	200 lb (91 kg)	
Ted Neal; G	Recruit ratings: (NR)				
Overall recruit ranking:
Note: In many cases, Scout, Rivals, 247Sports, On3, and ESPN may conflict in their listings of height and weight.; In these cases, the average was taken. ESPN grades are on a 100-point scale.; Sources: "2025 Team Ranking". Rivals.

== Preseason ==
=== Preseason Sun Belt Conference poll ===
The Mountaineers were picked to finish in seventh place in the conference's preseason poll. Junior guard Eren Banks was named to the conference preseason second team.

Coaches poll
Predicted finish	Team (1st place Votes)
1	James Madison - 175 (1)
2	Arkansas State - 154 (3)
3	South Alabama - 152 (4)
4	Troy - 148 (1)
5	Old Dominion - 145 (2)
6	Marshall - 128 (1)
7	App State - 123 (1)
8	Texas State - 106
9	Louisiana - 95 (1)
10	Georgia Southern - 66
11	Georgia State - 59
12	Southern Miss - 57
13	Coastal Carolina - 43
14	ULM - 19

== Roster ==
2025–26 Appalachian State Mountaineers men's basketball team
Players
Coaches

Pos.	#	Name	Height	Weight	Year	Previous school	Hometown
G	0	KJ Vasser	6 ft 1 in (1.85 m)	180 lb (82 kg)	Jr	Yorkville Christian; Moberly Area	Chicago, IL
G	2	Alonzo Dodd	6 ft 1 in (1.85 m)	170 lb (77 kg)	Sr	South St. Paul; Texas A&M Commerce	St. Paul, MN
C	3	Luke Wilson	6 ft 9 in (2.06 m)	255 lb (116 kg)	RS So	Augusta Christian School	Augusta, GA
G	4	Eren Banks	6 ft 3 in (1.91 m)	190 lb (86 kg)	Jr	Putnam County HS; Georgia Southern	Eatonton, GA
G	5	Jason Clarke Jr.	6 ft 0 in (1.83 m)	177 lb (80 kg)	So	Miller School	Silver Spring, MD
G	6	Jacari Brim	6 ft 2 in (1.88 m)	190 lb (86 kg)	Fr	West Forsyth HS	Winston-Salem, NC
G	7	Ted Neal	6 ft 7 in (2.01 m)	200 lb (91 kg)	Fr	Newton	Greensboro, GA
F	8	Tre McKinnon	6 ft 5 in (1.96 m)	177 lb (80 kg)	Fr	Lake Norman	Wilmington, NC
G	9	Jalen Tot	6 ft 1 in (1.85 m)	170 lb (77 kg)	GS	John Paul II HS; Montana State Billings	Dallas, TX
G	13	Kasen Jennings	6 ft 5 in (1.96 m)	210 lb (95 kg)	GS	Langston Hughes HS; South Florida	Atlanta, GA
G	14	Cameron O'Kelley	6 ft 3 in (1.91 m)	165 lb (75 kg)	So	Seneca Senior HS	Seneca, SC
F	21	Andrin Njock	6 ft 6 in (1.98 m)	205 lb (93 kg)	RS Fr	École nouvelle de la Suisse romande	Winterthur, Switzerland
F	23	Chad Moodie	6 ft 8 in (2.03 m)	225 lb (102 kg)	Jr	Grayson HS; Alabama A&M	Grayson, GA
G	32	Luke Ledford	6 ft 3 in (1.91 m)	190 lb (86 kg)	Jr	Broughton HS	Raleigh, NC
F	33	Grant Clayton	6 ft 7 in (2.01 m)	220 lb (100 kg)	Fr	A. C. Reynolds HS	Asheville, NC
F	44	Michael Marcus, Jr.	6 ft 9 in (2.06 m)	255 lb (116 kg)	So	Covenant Day	Indian Trail, NC

Head coach

- Dustin Kerns (Clemson)

Assistant coach(es)

- Bob Szorc (St. John's)
- Tim Johnson (Indiana State)
- Tanner Smith (Clemson)
- Raheem Martin (Greensboro)
- Bradley Fey (DePaul)

Legend

- (C) Team captain
- (S) Suspended
- (I) Ineligible
- (W) Walk-on
- Injured
- Current redshirt

Roster
Last update: October 21, 2025

== Schedule ==
Date time, TV	Rank^{#}	Opponent^{#}	Result	Record	High points	High rebounds	High assists	Site (attendance) city, state
Non-conference regular season
November 3, 2025*; 7:00 p.m., ESPN+		at Central Michigan; MAC–SBC Challenge	L 66–82	0–1	21 – Jennings	6 – Jennings	4 – Banks	McGuirk Arena (1,587); Mount Pleasant, MI
November 5, 2025*; 6:30 p.m., ESPN+		Carolina	W 92–46	1–1	14 – Wilson	9 – Njock	7 – Dodd	Holmes Center (1,522); Boone, NC
November 9, 2025*; 1:00 p.m., ESPN+		North Carolina Central	W 76–54	2–1	22 – Kasen	8 – Wilson	4 – Tied	Holmes Center (1,487); Boone, NC
November 11, 2025*; 6:30 p.m., B1G+		at Ohio State	L 53–75	2–2	12 – Jennings	7 – Wilson	3 – Banks	Value City Arena (7,938); Columbus, OH
November 16, 2025*; 12:00 p.m., ESPN+		at Dartmouth	W 85–77	3–2	21 – Jennings	7 – Banks	6 – Dodd	Leede Arena (807); Hanover, NH
November 21, 2025*; 6:30 p.m., ESPN+		Charlotte	W 65–63	4–2	15 – Jennings	5 – Marcus Jr.	3 – Banks	Holmes Center (3,043); Boone, NC
November 24, 2025*; 6:30 p.m., ESPN+		Elon	L 53–88	4–3	14 – Tot	6 – Wilson	3 – Jennings	Holmes Center (2,021); Boone, NC
November 26, 2025*; 2:00 p.m., ESPN+		at Mercer	L 67–75	4–4	16 – Jennings	8 – Marcus Jr.	4 – Jennings	Hawkins Arena (709); Macon, GA
November 30, 2025*; 1:30 p.m., ESPN+		at UNC Asheville	L 55–67	4–5	13 – Marcus Jr.	4 – Tied	3 – Jennings	Harrah's Cherokee Center (1,132); Asheville, NC
December 3, 2025*; 6:30 p.m., ESPN+		Virginia-Lynchburg	W 133–45	5–5	20 – Brim	16 – Njock	8 – Brim	Holmes Center (1,323); Boone, NC
December 11, 2025*; 7:00 p.m., ESPN+		at East Carolina	W 64–57	6–5	20 – Jennings	10 – Wilson	2 – Tied	Williams Arena (3,168); Greenville, NC
December 14, 2025*; 2:00 p.m., ESPN+		vs. High Point; Hickory Hoops Classic	W 86–78 ^{OT}	7-5	25 – Dodd	10 – Wilson	7 – Dodd	Shuford Arena (1,225); Hickory, NC
Sun Belt regular season
December 18, 2025; 6:30 p.m., ESPN+		Coastal Carolina	W 67–49	8–5 (1–0)	21 – Dodd	11 – Wilson	3 – Jennings	Holmes Center (1,447); Boone, NC
December 20, 2025; 1:00 p.m., ESPN+		Georgia State	L 63–70	8–6 (1–1)	19 – Dodd	10 – Wilson	3 – Banks	Holmes Center (1,711); Boone, NC
December 31, 2025; 2:00 p.m., ESPN+		at Old Dominion	W 81–73	9-6 (2–1)	20 – Marcus Jr.	10 – Marcus Jr.	7 – Dodd	Chartway Arena (4,184); Norfolk, VA
January 3, 2025; 4:00 p.m., ESPN+		at Marshall	L 81–88	9–7 (2–2)	21 – Marcus Jr.	9 – Tied	5 – Tied	Cam Henderson Center (3,933); Huntington, WV
January 8, 2025; 7:00 p.m., ESPN+		at Georgia State	W 52–50	10–7 (3–2)	14 – Tied	14 – Marcus Jr.	3 – Dodd	GSU Convocation Center (1,649); Atlanta, GA
January 10, 2025; 1:00 p.m., ESPN+		at Coastal Carolina	L 62-67	10–8 (3–3)	21 – Dodd	12 – Marcus Jr.	3 – Dodd	HTC Center (1,672); Conway, SC
January 15, 2026; 6:30 p.m., ESPN+		James Madison	W 80–65	11–8 (4–3)	23 – Tied	10 – Dodd	4 – Tot	Holmes Center (2,177); Boone, NC
January 17, 2026; 1:00 p.m., ESPN+		Old Dominion	L 73–75	11–9 (4–4)	27 – Dodd	9 – Wilson	9 – Dodd	Holmes Center (2,415); Boone, NC
January 22, 2026; 12:00 p.m., ESPN+		Louisiana	W 72–58	12–9 (5–4)	21 – Tot	9 – Wilson	10 – Dodd	Holmes Center (791); Boone, NC
January 23, 2026; 12:00 p.m., ESPN+		Louisiana–Monroe	W 59–43	13–9 (6–4)	14 – Tied	14 – Marcus Jr.	6 – Jennings	Holmes Center (805); Boone, NC
January 29, 2026; 8:00 p.m., ESPN+		at Southern Miss	W 70–63	14–9 (7–4)	19 – Tot	7 – Tied	3 – Banks	Reed Green Coliseum (3,164); Hattiesburg, MS
January 31, 2026; 4:33 p.m., ESPN+		at Troy	W 66–44	15–9 (8–4)	33 – Jennings	7 – Tied	9 – Dodd	Trojan Arena (3,256); Troy, AL
February 4, 2026; 6:30 p.m., ESPN+		South Alabama	W 65–57	16–9 (9–4)	23 – Tot	13 – Dodd	4 – Tied	Holmes Center (2,014); Boone, NC
February 7, 2026*; 1:00 p.m., ESPN+		Eastern Michigan; MAC–SBC Challenge	W 65–60	17–9	23 – Dodd	10 – Wilson	5 – Dodd	Holmes Center (1,870); Boone, NC
February 11, 2026; 8:00 p.m., ESPN+		at Georgia Southern	W 81–65	18–9 (10–4)	31 – Jennings	10 – Marcus Jr.	4 – Tot	Hill Convocation Center (1,812); Statesboro, GA
February 14, 2026; 4:00 p.m., ESPN+		at James Madison	L 58–69	18–10 (10–5)	18 – Tied	16 – Wilson	3 – Dodd	Atlantic Union Bank Center (4,528); Harrisonburg, VA
February 19, 2026; 6:30 p.m., ESPN+		Marshall	L 93–94	18–11 (10–6)	19 – Tied	7 – Dodd	7 – Dodd	Holmes Center (3,011); Boone, NC
February 21, 2026; 1:00 p.m., ESPN+		Georgia Southern	W 89–74	19–11 (11–6)	19 – Wilson	10 – Wilson	10 – Dodd	Holmes Center (3,701); Boone, NC
February 27, 2026; 8:00 p.m., ESPN+		Texas State	L 57–60	19–12 (11–7)	15 – Tied	13 – Wilson	3 – Jennings	Strahan Arena (4,054); San Marcos, TX
Sun Belt tournament
March 7, 2026; 6:30 p.m., ESPN+	(4)	vs. (8) Southern Miss; Quarterfinals	L 73–86	19–13	15 – Tied	14 – Wilson	3 – Banks	Pensacola Bay Center (11–7); Pensacola, FL
*Non-conference game. ^{#}Rankings from AP Poll. (#) Tournament seedings in parentheses. All times are in Eastern Time.
