= Emanuel Sharp =

Israeli-American professional basketball player (born 2004)

Emanuel Sharp עמנואל שארפ
No. 34 – Sacramento Kings
- Position: Shooting guard
- League: NBA

Personal information
- Born: March 7, 2004 (age 22) Tel Aviv, Israel
- Listed height: 6 ft 3 in (1.91 m)
- Listed weight: 212 lb (96 kg)

Career information
- High school: Bishop McLaughlin (Spring Hill, Florida)
- College: Houston (2022–2026)
- NBA draft: 2026: 2nd round, 45th overall pick
- Drafted by: Sacramento Kings
- Playing career: 2026–present

Career history
- 2026–present: Sacramento Kings

Career highlights
- First-team All-Big 12 (2026); Big 12 All-Defensive Team (2026); AAC All-Freshman Team (2023); Big 12 tournament MVP (2025)
- Stats at NBA.com
- Stats at Basketball Reference

Emanuel Christopher Sharp (Hebrew: עמנואל שארפ; born March 7, 2004) is an Israeli-American basketball shooting guard for the Sacramento Kings of the National Basketball Association (NBA).

Sharp played college basketball for the Houston Cougars, with whom in 2026 he was named First-team All-Big 12 and to the Big 12 All-Defensive Team. He was drafted by the Kings in the second round of the 2026 NBA draft,

== Early life ==
Sharp was born and raised in Tel Aviv, Israel. His father is naturalized Israeli and former Maccabi Tel Aviv basketball guard and captain Derrick Sharp. Derrick Sharp played college ball at the University of South Florida, where he averaged 15.1 points, 3.1 assists, and 1.1 steals per game while shooting 38.6% from three-point range and 82.5% from the free throw line. He then played his entire professional career in Israel, mostly with Maccabi Tel Aviv (for 15 years, from 1996 to 2011), helped them win the 2001 FIBA SuproLeague title and two EuroLeague titles, and was subsequently the assistant coach of the team from 2011 to 2013 under David Blatt.

Emanuel's Canadian-born mother Justine Ellison Sharp played basketball for the University of Toronto, led the team to two national silver medals, was named the women's 1996 university athlete of the year in her senior season, and was inducted into the school's Varsity Blues hall of fame in 2009. She went on to play professional basketball in Israel for a decade, and obtained Israeli citizenship upon marrying Derrick Sharp. Emanuel has three brothers, Gabriel (who played college basketball at Kalamazoo College), Noah, and Derrick Jr. (who plays pro basketball in Israel, and lives in Haifa), and a sister named Maya.

== High school ==
He was coached by his father in high school. As a sophomore in 2019–20, Sharp was Florida's fourth-leading scorer with 31.9 points per game at Blake High School in Tampa, Florida, and was named Florida Class 5A State Player of the Year. As a junior in 2020–21, he averaged 24.7 points, 3.9 assists, 2.6 rebounds, and 1.8 steals a game for Bishop McLaughlin Catholic High School, where he played alongside fellow future NBA draft pick Dillon Mitchell, and was named Florida Class 3A Player of the Year, and named to the Suncoast News All-County Team.

He did not compete as a senior in 2021–22, as he was recovering from a severe injury in which he broke his fibula and dislocated his ankle in a pickup game in May 2021; it took 18 months for him to recover from the injury. ESPN ranked Sharp the number 60 player nationally and the number 11 shooting guard nationally (he was ranked number 18 nationally by 247Sports, and number 20 by Rivals), and he was considered a 4-star recruit by ESPN, 247Sports, and Rivals.

Coming out of high school, Sharp committed to play college basketball for the Houston Cougars. He picked the team over other schools such as Texas Tech, Florida, Louisville, Georgia Tech, Rutgers, Arizona, Clemson, Penn State, SMU, Iona, and USF.

== College career ==
As a freshman in 2021–22 at the University of Houston, where he majored in integrated studies, Sharp was redshirted. As a redshirt freshman in 2022–23, he averaged 15.6 minutes, 5.9 points, and 2.2 rebounds per game while shooting 88.1% from the free throw line in 33 games off the bench. He was named to the 2022-23 AAC All-Freshman team.

During his 2023–24 sophomore season, Sharp averaged 12.6 points, 3.5 rebounds, and 1.5 steals (9th in the conference) per game while shooting 46.8% from three-point range (6th) and 85.1% from the free throw line (6th) in all of the team's 37 games (32 of which he started). In the second round of the 2024 NCAA Division I men's basketball tournament, Sharp led the way with 30 points and seven threes in a win over Texas A&M.

On November 22, 2024, Sharp hit five threes in a win over Hofstra. On November 30, he put up 23 points in an overtime loss to San Diego State. On January 25, 2025, Sharp scored eight points in a double overtime victory against Kansas. On February 18, he notched 17 points with four threes in a victory versus Arizona State. During the 2025 Big 12 men's basketball tournament and NCAA Midwest Regional, Sharp helped lead his team to a conference title, where he was named the tournament's Most Outstanding Player. In the March Madness tournament, Sharp and the Cougars would reach the championship game, where they fell short at the buzzer against Florida, with the final score being 65–63.

During the 2024–25 season, he averaged 12.6 points, 3.0 rebounds, and 1.4 steals per game while shooting 40.7% from three-point range and 86.8% from the free throw line (4th in the conference) in 37 games (36 of which he started). Sharp was named the 2025 Big 12 Tournament MVP, the 2025 NCAA Tournament Midwest Regional Most Outstanding Player, and to the 2025 All-Big 12 Tournament team, the 2025 NCAA Tournament All-Region team, and the 2025 Winter All-Big 12 Academic Team.

During his 2025–26 senior season, Sharp averaged 15.5 points, 3.0 rebounds, 1.7 assists, and 1.2 steals per game while shooting 37.2% from three-point range (6th in the conference) and a Big 12 Conference-leading 89.1% from the free throw line in 37 games (all of which he started). He was named to the 2025-26 All-Big 12 - 1st Team, and the 2025-26 Big 12 All-Defense team.

His career 87.0% free throw shooting percentage is third all-time in the Big 12 Conference. Sharp also set the Cougars' record for career three-pointers, with 309.

== Professional career ==
On June 24, 2026, Sharp was selected by the Sacramento Kings with the 45th overall pick in the 2026 NBA draft. At the time, there were three other Israeli players playing in the NBA: Deni Avdija, Ben Saraf, and Danny Wolf.

== National team ==
In 2019, at 15 years of age and between his freshman and sophomore years of high school, Sharp was a member of the Israeli Under-16 national team. He competed in the FIBA U16 European Championship, averaging 25 points per game. In 2025, Sharp said that he would play for Team Israel again, if the timing were right.

== Style of play ==
Analysts consider Sharp to be a high-IQ basketball player, with a very good quick release three-point shot, excellent off-the-ball skills, known for making few turnovers, and being an excellent defender. He was projected to specialize in shooting three-point shots and play top perimeter defense. Scouts compared his game to that of Tim Hardaway Jr., exhibiting toughness, effort, and reliability.

== Personal life ==
Sharp has Israeli, American and Canadian citizenship.

== Career statistics ==
Legend
GP	Games played	GS	Games started	MPG	Minutes per game
FG%	Field goal percentage	3P%	3-point field goal percentage	FT%	Free throw percentage
RPG	Rebounds per game	APG	Assists per game	SPG	Steals per game
BPG	Blocks per game	PPG	Points per game	**Bold**	Career high

=== College ===
Year	Team	GP	GS	MPG	FG%	3P%	FT%	RPG	APG	SPG	BPG	PPG
2021–22	Houston	Redshirt										
2022–23	Houston	33	0	15.6	.365	.347	.881	2.2	.5	.3	**.1**	5.9
2023–24	Houston	**37**	32	28.2	.373	.368	.851	**3.5**	.9	**1.5**	**.1**	12.6
2024–25	Houston	**37**	36	27.3	**.418**	**.407**	.868	3.0	.8	1.4	.0	12.6
2025–26	Houston	**37**	**37**	**29.4**	.413	.372	**.891**	3.0	**1.7**	1.2	**.1**	**15.5**
Career		144	105	25.4	.397	.376	.871	3.0	1.0	1.1	.1	11.8
