= J'Wan Roberts =

American basketball player (born 2001)

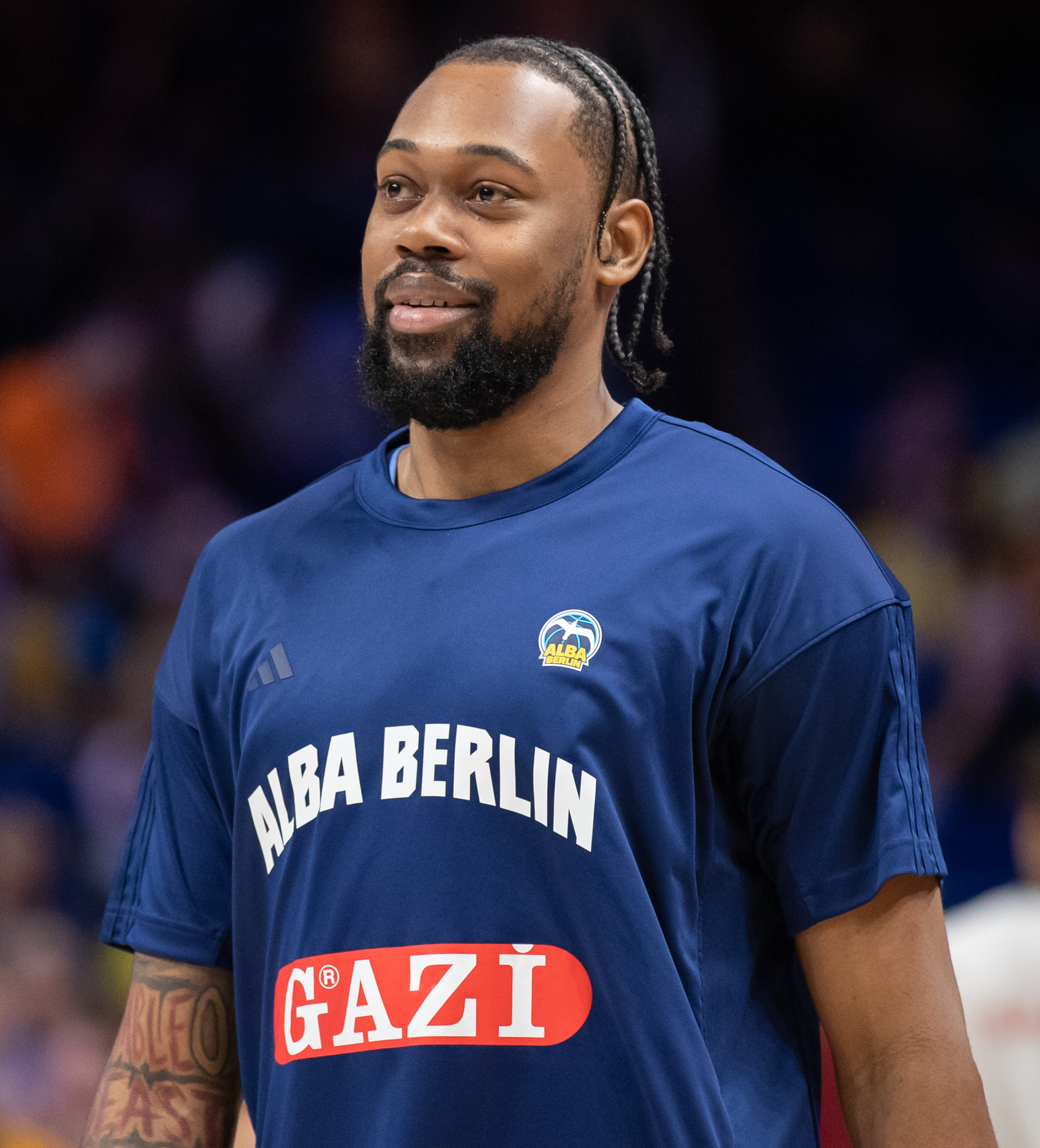
- Roberts in 2025

No. 3 – Nanterre 92
- Position: Forward
- League: LNB Élite; Champions League

Personal information
- Born: September 19, 2001 (age 25) Saint Thomas, U.S. Virgin Islands
- Listed height: 6 ft 8 in (2.03 m)
- Listed weight: 235 lb (107 kg)

Career information
- High school: Shoemaker (Killeen, Texas)
- College: Houston (2020–2025)
- NBA draft: 2025: undrafted
- Playing career: 2025–present

Career history
- 2025–2026: Alba Berlin
- 2026–present: Nanterre 92

Career highlights
- First-team All-Big 12 (2025); Third-team All-Big 12 (2024); Big 12 All-Defensive Team (2025); Second-team All-AAC (2023); AAC Most Improved Player (2023)

J'Wan Andone Roberts (born September 19, 2001) is an American professional basketball player for Nanterre 92 of the French LNB Élite and the Champions League.

== Early life and high school career ==
Roberts was born and raised in Saint Thomas, U.S. Virgin Islands. After completing the 8th grade, he moved to the United States to live with his aunt in Killeen, Texas, in order to pursue a basketball career and increase his exposure to scouts. Houston coach Kelvin Sampson first noticed Roberts in 2017 while scouting another player at an exhibition game in Las Vegas. Sampson began tracking Roberts' career and following a strong junior season at Shoemaker High School, offered him a scholarship. Following an official visit, Roberts committed to the University of Houston on September 2, 2018.

== College career ==
Roberts redshirted during the 2019–20 season. In 2020–21, he began to receive playing time while Fabian White Jr. was injured. Following White's return from injury, Roberts received less playing time as the Cougars made a run to the Final Four. Roberts emerged as a key player off the bench for the Cougars in 2021–22, establishing himself as one of the team's top rebounders. In 2022–23, Roberts' play continued to improve, and he was named a starter. Along with becoming a leader in the locker room, he helped Houston achieve their first AP Poll #1 ranking since 1983, garnering praise from former Cougar Hakeem Olajuwon.

Due to NCAA rules on granting a bonus year of eligibility for all student-athletes impacted by COVID during the 2020-21 season, Roberts had the chance to play for a fifth season with the 2024-25 season. During the year, he became the fourth player (Elvin Hayes, Hakeem Olajuwon, Cadillac Anderson) with 1,000 rebounds and 1,000 points in program history.

== Professional career ==
On August 27, 2025, he signed with Alba Berlin of the German Basketball Bundesliga (BBL).

On July 29, 2026, he signed with Nanterre 92 of the French LNB Élite.

== Career statistics ==
Legend
GP	Games played	GS	Games started	MPG	Minutes per game
FG%	Field goal percentage	3P%	3-point field goal percentage	FT%	Free throw percentage
RPG	Rebounds per game	APG	Assists per game	SPG	Steals per game
BPG	Blocks per game	PPG	Points per game	**Bold**	Career high

=== College ===
Year	Team	GP	GS	MPG	FG%	3P%	FT%	RPG	APG	SPG	BPG	PPG
2019–20	Houston	Redshirt										
2020–21	Houston	25	1	10.8	.559	–	.526	3.8	.3	.4	.6	1.9
2021–22	Houston	**38**	0	16.2	**.628**	**.000**	.500	4.9	.5	.6	.4	3.2
2022–23	Houston	37	36	26.4	.612	**.000**	**.686**	**7.7**	1.2	.7	**1.3**	10.0
2023–24	Houston	36	36	26.7	.596	**.000**	.511	6.8	**1.9**	**1.3**	.9	9.5
2024–25	Houston	37	**37**	**30.3**	.490	–	.625	6.5	1.8	1.0	.7	**10.6**
Career		173	110	20.7	.564	.000	.589	6.1	1.2	.8	.8	7.4

== See also ==
- List of NCAA Division I men's basketball career games played leaders
