= Ja'Vier Francis =

American basketball player (born 2003)

ASK Karditsas
- Position: Power forward
- League: GBL

Personal information
- Born: October 20, 2003 (age 23) New Orleans, Louisiana, U.S.
- Listed height: 6 ft 8 in (2.03 m)
- Listed weight: 235 lb (107 kg)

Career information
- High school: Westbury Christian (Houston, Texas); Montverde Academy (Montverde, Florida)
- College: Houston (2021–2025)
- NBA draft: 2025: undrafted
- Playing career: 2025–present

Career history
- 2025–2026: Santa Cruz Warriors
- 2026–present: Karditsa
- Stats at NBA.com
- Stats at Basketball Reference

Ja'Vier Joseph Francis (born October 20, 2003) is an American professional basketball player for Karditsa of the Greek Basketball League (GBL). He played college basketball for the Houston Cougars.

== Early life and high school ==
Francis attended Montverde Academy. He was rated as the 22nd overall center and the 127th overall player in the class of 2020 and committed to play college basketball for the Houston Cougars over other schools such as DePaul, SMU, Washington State, North Texas, Texas Southern and Stephen F. Austin.

== College career ==
On January 18, 2022, Francis put up two points, a rebound, and a block in a victory over South Florida. During the 2021–22 season, he averaged 1.2 points and 0.9 rebounds in 18 games. On December 13, 2022, Francis put up 17 points, 15 rebounds, and three blocks in a blowout win versus North Carolina A&T. In the 2022–23 season, he played in 35 games with one start, where he averaged 4.3 points, 3.5 rebounds, and 1.1 blocks per game. On January 6, 2024, he recorded 13 points in a victory over West Virginia. During the 2023–24 season, Francis became a full-time starter for the Cougars and averaged 6.0 points and 5.2 rebounds per game. On November 30, 2024, he put up five points and six rebounds in an overtime loss to San Diego State. On January 18, 2025, Francis recorded 16 points and ten rebounds in a victory over UCF. In the 2024–25 season, he played in 38 games with seven starts, where he averaged 5.1 points, 4.4 rebounds, and 1.0 block per game.

== Professional career ==
For the 2025–26 season, Francis was added to the roster of the Golden State Warriors' NBA G League affiliate, the Santa Cruz Warriors.

On July 29, he joined Karditsa of the Greek Basketball League (GBL). He was voted the MVP of the season opener against Aris, after posting 19 points, 9 rebounds and 4 blocks.

== Career statistics ==
Legend
GP	Games played	GS	Games started	MPG	Minutes per game
FG%	Field goal percentage	3P%	3-point field goal percentage	FT%	Free throw percentage
RPG	Rebounds per game	APG	Assists per game	SPG	Steals per game
BPG	Blocks per game	PPG	Points per game	**Bold**	Career high

=== College ===
Year	Team	GP	GS	MPG	FG%	3P%	FT%	RPG	APG	SPG	BPG	PPG
2021–22	Houston	18	0	4.1	.643	–	.333	.9	.0	.1	.6	1.2
2022–23	Houston	35	1	10.3	**.713**	–	.591	3.5	**.2**	.3	1.1	4.3
2023–24	Houston	37	**37**	**20.7**	.646	–	.529	**5.2**	**.2**	**.9**	**1.6**	**6.0**
2024–25	Houston	**38**	7	15.7	.608	**.000**	**.721**	4.4	**.2**	.4	1.0	5.1
Career		128	45	14.0	.649	.000	.602	3.9	.2	.5	1.1	4.6
