= Jamal Shead =

American basketball player (born 2002)

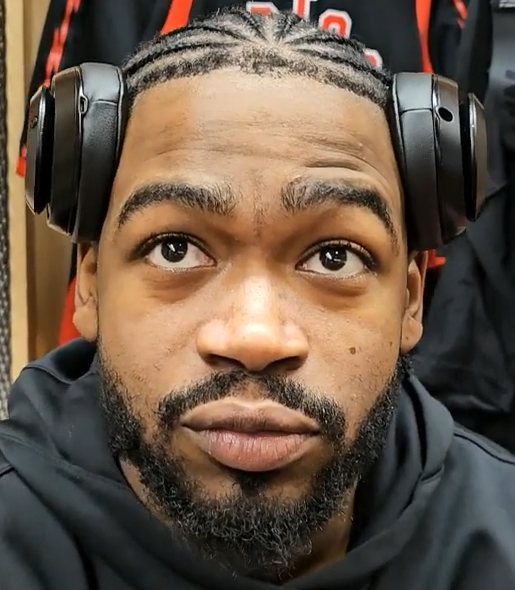
- Shead in 2025

No. 1 – Toronto Raptors
- Position: Point guard
- League: NBA

Personal information
- Born: July 24, 2002 (age 24) Austin, Texas, U.S.
- Listed height: 6 ft 1 in (1.85 m)
- Listed weight: 200 lb (91 kg)

Career information
- High school: John B. Connally (Austin, Texas); Manor (Manor, Texas)
- College: Houston (2020–2024)
- NBA draft: 2024: 2nd round, 45th overall pick
- Drafted by: Sacramento Kings
- Playing career: 2024–present

Career history
- 2024–present: Toronto Raptors
- 2024: →Raptors 905

Career highlights
- Consensus first-team All-American (2024); Naismith Defensive Player of the Year (2024); NABC Defensive Player of the Year (2024); Big 12 Player of the Year (2024); First-team All-Big 12 (2024); Big 12 Defensive Player of the Year (2024); Big 12 All-Defensive Team (2024); Second-team All-AAC (2023); Third-team All-AAC (2022); AAC Defensive Player of the Year (2023)
- Stats at NBA.com
- Stats at Basketball Reference

Jamal Daniel Shead (/ʃɛd/ SHED; born July 24, 2002) is an American professional basketball player for the Toronto Raptors of the National Basketball Association (NBA). He played college basketball for the Houston Cougars.

== Early life and high school career ==
Shead began his high school career at John B. Connally High School before transferring to Manor High School. He averaged 18.1 points, 6 rebounds and 3.9 assists per game as a junior. Shead led Manor High School to the state tournament for the first time in school history and scored 44 points in a win over Rudder High School, earning District 18-5A Most Valuable Player honors. As a senior, he averaged 19.3 points and 4.3 assists per game, helping Manor achieve a 28–10 record and the District 18-5A title. Considered a three-star recruit by the 247Sports Composite, Shead committed to playing college basketball for Houston over Texas A&M, SMU and Colorado State.

== College career ==
As a freshman, Shead averaged 3.3 points and 1.5 assists per game, logging minor minutes as a backup point guard on Houston's 2020–21 Final Four team. In 2021–22, Shead's sophomore season, he averaged 10 points and 5.8 assists per game. During the season he was promoted to the starting lineup after injuries to starting guards Marcus Sasser and Tramon Mark. Shead paced Houston's offense as the Cougars won both the American Athletic Conference (AAC) regular-season and tournament championships. In the NCAA tournament, Shead averaged 15 points per game en route to an Elite Eight berth for the Cougars, which included an upset of South Regional No. 1 seed Arizona in the Sweet 16, in which Shead led his team with 21 points. Shead was named to the All-AAC Third Team. As a junior, he averaged 10.5 points, 5.4 assists, 3.0 rebounds and 1.7 steals per game. Shead was named to the All-AAC Second Team and earned AAC Defensive Player of the Year honors. Following the season, he declared for the 2023 NBA draft but ultimately returned to Houston for his senior season. In 2023–24, their first year in the Big 12, Shead led the Cougars to a regular-season title with averages of 12.9 points, 6.3 assists and 2.2 steals per game. He was named the Big 12 Player of the Year and Defensive Player of the Year, becoming the first player to win both awards in the same season.

== Professional career ==
=== Toronto Raptors (2024–present) ===
In the 2024 NBA draft, Shead was selected with the 45th overall pick by the Sacramento Kings. He was traded on draft night along with Davion Mitchell, Aleksandar Vezenkov and a 2025 second-round pick to the Toronto Raptors in exchange for Jalen McDaniels. Shead started his rookie year as Toronto's third-string point guard, but was further prioritized by the mid-season trade deadline with Mitchell being sent out. From February 2025 onwards, his minutes and production increased as the Raptors starters dealt with injuries, him acting as the unit leader off the bench. He finished the season having played 74 games, averaging 7.1 points, 4.1 assists and 1.5 rebounds in approximately 20 minutes per game. He recorded 307 total assists, second among rookies in franchise history and fourth among rookies in the league. The Toronto Star wrote that despite his relatively meager statistics, his progress was "arguably the most positive development" of the season for the Raptors.

On December 29, 2025, Shead scored 19 points in an 107–106 Raptors win over the Orlando Magic. On January 11, 2026, Shead had a career-high and team-high 22 points in an 116–115 win over the Philadelphia 76ers. On January 16, 2026, Shead dished out 15 points and a career-high 13 assists in an 117–121 overtime loss to the Los Angeles Clippers. He appeared in all 82 games (starting 12) for Toronto during the 2025–26 season, recording averages of 6.6 points, 1.7 rebounds and 5.4 assists.

On October 1, 2026, Shead signed a three-year contract extension with the Raptors.

== Career statistics ==
Legend
GP	Games played	GS	Games started	MPG	Minutes per game
FG%	Field goal percentage	3P%	3-point field goal percentage	FT%	Free throw percentage
RPG	Rebounds per game	APG	Assists per game	SPG	Steals per game
BPG	Blocks per game	PPG	Points per game	**Bold**	Career high
*	Led the league

=== NBA ===
==== Regular season ====
Year	Team	GP	GS	MPG	FG%	3P%	FT%	RPG	APG	SPG	BPG	PPG
2024–25	Toronto	75	11	19.6	**.405**	**.323**	.768	1.5	4.2	.8	.1	**7.1**
2025–26	Toronto	**82***	**12**	**22.6**	.367	.321	**.784**	**1.7**	**5.4**	**.9**	**.2**	6.6
Career		157	23	21.1	.386	.322	.778	1.6	4.8	.9	.2	6.9

==== Playoffs ====
Year	Team	GP	GS	MPG	FG%	3P%	FT%	RPG	APG	SPG	BPG	PPG
2026	Toronto	7	4	32.0	.354	.333	.500	2.0	5.0	1.4	.1	9.0
Career		7	4	32.0	.354	.333	.500	2.0	5.0	1.4	.1	9.0

=== College ===
Year	Team	GP	GS	MPG	FG%	3P%	FT%	RPG	APG	SPG	BPG	PPG
2020–21	Houston	26	2	9.9	**.455**	.125	.750	1.1	1.5	.8	.2	3.3
2021–22	Houston	**38**	32	31.0	.405	.298	**.802**	3.0	5.8	1.6	.2	10.0
2022–23	Houston	37	**37**	**32.6**	.415	**.310**	.732	3.0	5.4	1.7	.2	10.5
2023–24	Houston	37	**37**	31.1	.409	.309	.779	**3.7**	**6.3**	**2.2**	**.5**	**12.9**
Career		138	108	27.5	.412	.296	.772	2.8	5.0	1.6	.3	9.7
