= Joseph Tugler =

American basketball player

No. 11 – Houston Cougars
- Position: Power forward
- League: Big 12 Conference

Personal information
- Born: Monroe, Louisiana, U.S.
- Listed height: 6 ft 8 in (2.03 m)
- Listed weight: 230 lb (104 kg)

Career information
- High school: Cypress Falls (Houston, Texas)
- College: Houston (2023–present)

Career highlights
- Lefty Driesell Award (2025); Third-team All-Big 12 (2025); Big 12 Defensive Player of the Year (2025); 2× Big 12 All-Defensive Team (2025, 2026); Big 12 All-Freshman team (2024)

Joseph De’Merrius "JoJo" Tugler is an American college basketball player for the Houston Cougars of the Big 12 Conference.

== Early life and high school ==
Tugler was born and initially grew up in Monroe, Louisiana before his family moved to Houston, Texas. He attended Cypress Falls High School. Tugler was named All-District 16-6A as a junior. He committed to play college basketball at Houston over offers from Kansas State, SMU, TCU, and Tulsa.

== College career ==
Tugler was a key reserve for the Houston Cougars during his freshman season. He suffered a broken foot in early March and missed the rest of his freshman season. Tugler averaged 3.8 points and 4.1 rebounds in 28 games.

== Personal life ==
Tugler's older twin sisters, Alexar and Elexar, both played college basketball for Louisiana–Monroe.

== Career statistics ==
Legend
GP	Games played	GS	Games started	MPG	Minutes per game
FG%	Field goal percentage	3P%	3-point field goal percentage	FT%	Free throw percentage
RPG	Rebounds per game	APG	Assists per game	SPG	Steals per game
BPG	Blocks per game	PPG	Points per game	**Bold**	Career high

=== College ===
Year	Team	GP	GS	MPG	FG%	3P%	FT%	RPG	APG	SPG	BPG	PPG
2023–24	Houston	28	1	16.0	.551	.000	.463	4.1	.3	.9	1.1	3.8
2024–25	Houston	**40**	33	21.7	.523	.273	.538	**5.9**	.9	1.0	**1.9**	5.5
2025–26	Houston	37	**36**	**23.5**	**.576**	**1.000**	**.707**	5.3	**1.3**	**1.3**	1.5	**8.4**
Career		105	70	20.8	.553	.286	.591	5.2	.9	1.1	1.5	6.0
