= Kellen Sampson =

American basketball coach (born 1985)

Current position
- Title: Assistant coach
- Team: Houston
- Conference: Big 12 Conference

Biographical details
- Born: June 18, 1985 (age 41); Butte, Montana, U.S.

Playing career
- 2004–2007: Oklahoma
- Position: Guard

Coaching career (HC unless noted)
- 2007–2008: Indiana (GA)
- 2008–2009: Oklahoma (GA)
- 2009–2010: Oklahoma (assistant S&C)
- 2010–2011: Stephen F. Austin (assistant)
- 2011–2014: Appalachian State (assistant)
- 2014–present: Houston (assistant)

Kellen Sampson (born June 18, 1985) is an American college basketball coach who is an assistant coach for the Houston Cougars men's basketball team.

== Early life and playing career ==
Sampson played college basketball for his father, Kelvin Sampson at Oklahoma. He remained with the Sooners to play his senior year after his father left to become the head coach of Indiana.

== Coaching career ==
Sampson began his coaching career as a graduate assistant on his father's staff at Indiana. After Kelvin was fired in 2008, Kellen left the Hoosiers and returned to Oklahoma as a graduate assistant. He spent the following season as an assistant strength & conditioning coach with the Sooners.

Sampson was hired as an assistant at Stephen F. Austin in 2010. After one season he was hired as an assistant at Appalachian State. Sampson spent three seasons at Appalachian State before being hired as an assistant at Houston after his father was named the head coach of the Cougars. On June 12, 2023, he was named head coach in waiting to succeed his father after they both signed new contracts to remain with the Cougars.
