= Beaumont United High School =

Location
- 3443 Fannett Rd; Beaumont, Texas 77705; United States; 30°3′9″N 94°6′54″W

Information
- Type: Public High school
- Established: 2018
- School district: Beaumont Independent School District
- Superintendent: Dr. Shannon Allen
- Principal: Tamara Long
- Grades: 9-12
- Enrollment: 2460.5 (2018 est.)
- Colors: Maroon and gold
- Athletics conference: 9 6-A Div 3 Football; 21-5A Volleyball, Basketball (girls and boys), Softball, Baseball, and soccer
- Mascot: Timberwolves
- Newspaper: The Howl
- Website: united.bmtisd.com

Beaumont United High School is a public high school in Beaumont, Texas. It is one of two high schools in the Beaumont Independent School District, serving its eastern half, and was established in fall 2018 by the merger of Clifton J. Ozen High School and Central High School. United uses the former Ozen campus, and the new school offers all of the courses offered at the former schools. The students of Ozen and Central voted on the school name, colors, and team name.

== History ==
In 2017, Hurricane Harvey severely damaged the Central High School campus. The Beaumont Independent School District decided in January 2018 to combine Central with Ozen High School on the Ozen campus as a new high school to serve the eastern half of the district, with West Brook High School serving the western half. The name Beaumont United, announced in February 2018, was the most popular in a vote open to all students at the schools to be combined; in the interests of unity, proposals to name the school after an individual, including Barack Obama, were not included on the ballot.

In January 2018, Central had approximately 1,300 students and Ozen approximately 1,150; the capacity of the Ozen campus, then 1,800, was increased by the addition of a modular building with 16 classrooms. These were used to create a Ninth Grade Academy to foster freshmen's transition to high school. All classes offered and all teachers at the two former schools were retained in the merger.

Enrollment in the school's first year was a little over 2,000; 475 seniors graduated in 2019. At the start of the 2019–20 school year, Charisma Popillion became principal.

== Demographics ==
The demographic breakdown of the 2,269 students from combining Ozen and Central students enrolled for the 2017–2018 school year is as follows:

- Male - 52.4%
- Female - 47.5%
- Black or African American - 69.2%
- Asian - 0.9%
- Hispanic - 26.9%
- Multiracial - 1.2%
- White - 1.5%

At the time of the merger, Texas Education Agency data indicated that Beaumont United would have approximately 90% economically disadvantaged students, as opposed to a little over half at West Brook.

== Athletics ==
Athletes at Beaumont United are Timberwolves, chosen together with the school's name and colors by student vote; other options included Wildcats. Central athletes had been Jaguars and Ozen athletes Panthers; the two schools were rivals in basketball.

The Timberwolves compete in the following sports:

- Baseball
- Boys Basketball
- Girls Basketball
- Boys Cross Country
- Girls Cross Country
- Football
- Boys Golf
- Girls Golf
- Boys Soccer
- Girls Soccer
- Softball
- Boys Swimming & Diving
- Girls Swimming & Diving
- Team Tennis
- Boys Tennis
- Girls Tennis
- Boys Track & Field
- Girls Track & Field
- Girls Volleyball
- Boys Wrestling
- Girls Wrestling

The boys' basketball team won the state 5A championship in 2021, the first basketball title for the district since 2001.

== Notable alumni ==
- Zemaiah Vaughn (2020), NFL cornerback
- Terrance Arceneaux (2022), college basketball player
- Chandler Rivers (2022), college football cornerback
