= Quannas White =

American basketball coach (born 1981)

Current position
- Title: Head coach
- Team: Louisiana
- Conference: Sun Belt
- Record: 11–22 (.333)

Biographical details
- Born: January 21, 1981 (age 45); New Orleans, Louisiana, U.S.

Playing career
- 1999–2001: Midland JC
- 2001–2003: Oklahoma
- 2003–2004: Besançon BCD
- 2005: Sioux Falls Skyforce
- 2005–2006: Austin Toros
- 2007–2008: Rio Grande Valley Vipers
- Position: Guard

Coaching career (HC unless noted)
- 2003–2004: Oklahoma (GA)
- 2005–2014: Louisiana Dynasty AAU
- 2014–2016: Tulane (assistant)
- 2016–2017: Western Kentucky (assistant)
- 2017–2023: Houston (assistant)
- 2023–2025: Houston (associate HC)
- 2025–present: Louisiana

Head coaching record
- Overall: 11–22 (.333)

Quannas White (born January 21, 1981) is an American college basketball coach who serves as the head coach for the Louisiana Ragin' Cajuns of the Sun Belt Conference.

== Playing career ==
White spent his first two seasons at Midland College before transferring to play for Oklahoma, where he averaged 11 points, six assists and 4.3 rebounds in his two-year Sooner career. He finished as the all-time leading 3-point shooter by percentage, and helped lead the team to the Final Four. After his college career, White spent time in NBA D-League with the Austin Toros and the Rio Grande Valley Vipers.

== Coaching career ==
In 2003, White got his first coaching job as a graduate assistant at his alma mater Oklahoma. From 2005 to 2014, he served as the head coach for the Louisiana Dynasty AAU basketball team. Ahead of the 2014 season, White was hired by Tulane as an assistant coach. In 2016, he was hired as an assistant coach at Western Kentucky. Ahead of the 2017 season, White joined Houston, in the same capacity as an assistant coach. In 2023, he was promoted to associate head coach. On March 10, 2025, White was hired by the Louisiana Ragin' Cajuns to be the team's next head coach.

== Head coaching record ==
Record table
Season	Team	Overall	Conference	Standing	Postseason
Louisiana Ragin' Cajuns (Sun Belt Conference) (2025–present)
2025–26	Louisiana	11–22	7–11	T–11th	
Louisiana:		11–22 (.333)	7–11 (.389)		
Total:		11–22 (.333)			
National champion Postseason invitational champion Conference regular season champion Conference regular season and conference tournament champion Division regular season champion Division regular season and conference tournament champion Conference tournament champion
