= Hollis Price =

American basketball player (born 1979)

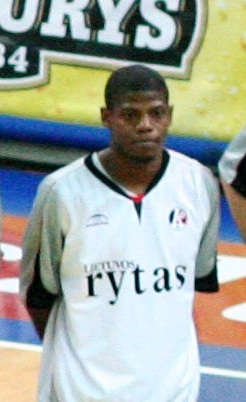

Houston Cougars
- Title: Assistant coach
- League: Big 12 Conference

Personal information
- Born: October 29, 1979 (age 47) New Orleans, Louisiana, U.S.
- Listed height: 6 ft 1.25 in (1.86 m)
- Listed weight: 195 lb (88 kg)

Career information
- High school: St. Augustine (New Orleans, Louisiana)
- College: Oklahoma (1999–2003)
- NBA draft: 2003: undrafted
- Playing career: 2003–2011
- Position: Shooting guard

Career history

Playing
- 2003–2005: Le Mans
- 2005–2006: Alba Berlin
- 2006–2007: Cajasol Sevilla
- 2007–2008: Lietuvos Rytas
- 2008–2009: Dynamo Moscow
- 2009–2010: Olimpia Milano
- 2010: Artland Dragons
- 2010–2011: Alba Berlin

Coaching
- 2013–2014: Texas Legends (assistant)
- 2014–2021: Houston (dir. player development)
- 2021–present: Houston (assistant)

Career highlights
- LKL All-Star Game MVP (2008); French Cup champion (2004); Consensus second-team All-American (2003); Third-team All-American – SN (2002)

Hollis Price (born October 29, 1979) is an American basketball coach and former professional basketball player. He is currently an assistant coach for the University of Houston men's basketball program.

== College career ==
Price played college basketball at the University of Oklahoma from 1999 to 2003. He helped to lead the Sooners to the Final Four in 2002. He is widely regarded as one of the best basketball players to come out of the University of Oklahoma since Wayman Tisdale.

== Professional career ==
He previously played for BC Lietuvos Rytas of Lithuania's LKL, ALBA Berlin of Germany, Le Mans Sarthe Basket of France, and CB Sevilla of ACB. In the 2007–08 Euroleague season, Price was the top scorer of the BC Lietuvos Rytas and its main play maker. Price was the first player signed by Dynamo Moscow following the hiring of coach David Blatt.

He joined Olimpia Milano in 2009. In February 2010 Price moved to Artland Dragons. On August 3, 2010, he returned to ALBA Berlin by signing a one-year contract, but was released in February 2011.

== Coaching career ==
On May 1, 2014, Price was hired as director of player development for the University of Houston men's basketball program. In 2021, he was named an assistant coach.

== EuroLeague career statistics ==
Legend
GP	Games played	GS	Games started	MPG	Minutes per game
FG%	Field-goal percentage	3P%	3-point field-goal percentage	FT%	Free-throw percentage
RPG	Rebounds per game	APG	Assists per game	SPG	Steals per game
BPG	Blocks per game	PPG	Points per game	PIR	Performance index rating
**Bold**	Career high

Year	Team	GP	GS	MPG	FG%	3P%	FT%	RPG	APG	SPG	BPG	PPG	PIR
2007–08	Lietuvos Rytas	**20**	**20**	**33.4**	**.523**	**.438**	**.873**	**2.2**	**3.9**	**1.0**	**.0**	**16.9**	**14.1**
2009–10	Milano	6	4	29.0	.444	.364	.833	2.3	1.8	.7	**.0**	9.5	6.0
