= 2026–27 South Alabama Jaguars men's basketball team =

American college basketball season

2026–27 South Alabama Jaguars men's basketball
- Conference: Sun Belt Conference
- Record: 2–3 (0–0 Sun Belt)
- Head coach: Richie Riley (9th season)
- Assistant coaches: Orin Bailey, Jr.; John Aiken; Mark Rutledge; Will Braden
- Home arena: Mitchell Center

2026–27 Sun Belt Conference men's basketball standings
| | Conf. | | | | Overall |
| Team | W | | L | PCT | W | | L | PCT |
|---|---|---|---|---|---|---|---|---|
| Old Dominion | 0 | – | 0 | – | 5 | – | 0 | 1.000 |
| Appalachian State | 0 | – | 0 | – | 3 | – | 1 | .750 |
| Arkansas State | 0 | – | 0 | – | 2 | – | 2 | .500 |
| James Madison | 0 | – | 0 | – | 2 | – | 2 | .500 |
| Louisiana Tech | 0 | – | 0 | – | 2 | – | 2 | .500 |
| Southern Miss | 0 | – | 0 | – | 2 | – | 2 | .500 |
| Coastal Carolina | 0 | – | 0 | – | 2 | – | 3 | .400 |
| Georgia State | 0 | – | 0 | – | 2 | – | 3 | .400 |
| South Alabama | 0 | – | 0 | – | 2 | – | 3 | .400 |
| Louisiana | 0 | – | 0 | – | 1 | – | 2 | .333 |
| Louisiana–Monroe | 0 | – | 0 | – | 2 | – | 5 | .286 |
| Georgia Southern | 0 | – | 0 | – | 1 | – | 3 | .250 |
| Marshall | 0 | – | 0 | – | 1 | – | 3 | .250 |
| Troy | 0 | – | 0 | – | 1 | – | 3 | .250 |
† 2027 Sun Belt tournament winner As of November 17, 2026; Rankings from AP poll

The 2026–27 South Alabama Jaguars men's basketball team will represent the University of South Alabama in the 2026–27 NCAA Division I men's basketball season. The Jaguars, led by ninth-year head coach Richie Riley, will play their home games at the Mitchell Center in Mobile, Alabama as members in the Sun Belt Conference.

== Previous season ==
The Jaguars finished the 2025–26 season 21–12, 11–7 in Sun Belt play to finish in a six-way tie for second place. In the Sun Belt tournament, they lost in the fourth round to Georgia Southern.

The Jaguars were offered a bid to the 2026 National Invitation Tournament, where they lost to Auburn in the first round.

== Offseason ==
=== Departures ===
| Name | Number | Pos. | Height | Weight | Year | Hometown | Reason for departure |
|---|---|---|---|---|---|---|---|
| Jayden Cooper | 1 | G | 6'2" | 185 | Junior | Pike Road, AL | Transferred to East Tennessee State |
| Chaze Harris | 2 | G | 6'6" | 190 | Senior | Cleveland, OH | Transferred to Charlotte |
| Hantz Louis Jeune | 4 | G | 6'5" | 185 | GS Senior | Lake Worth, FL | Graduated |
| JJ Wheat | 6 | G | 6'0" | 180 | Senior | Clarksville, TN | Graduated |
| Brian Hawthorne | 7 | G | 6'2" | 190 | Junior | Shawnee, KS | Transferred to Parkside |
| Maxwell Land | 10 | G | 6'4" | 200 | RS Senior | Cincinnati, OH | Graduated |
| Adam Olsen | 12 | F | 6'8" | 225 | Junior | Surrey, BC | Transferred to Auburn |
| John Broom | 14 | G | 6'5" | 185 | RS Sophomore | Jacksonville, AL | Transferred to Vermont |
| Randy Brady | 34 | G/F | 6'5" | 220 | Senior | Chattanooga, TN | Graduated |

=== Incoming transfers ===
| Name | Number | Pos. | Height | Weight | Year | Hometown | Previous School |
|---|---|---|---|---|---|---|---|
| Jalen Langsy | 1 | G | 6'1" | 185 | Junior | Shakopee, MN | Northwestern (IA) |
| Lenni Kunzewitsch | 6 | F | 6'10" | 220 | Junior | Gotha, Germany | Ratiopharm Ulm |
| Owen Kenney | 7 | F | 6'7" | 225 | Junior | Barrie, ON | Ottawa |
| Roderick Williams Jr. | 10 | F | 6'6" | 230 | Sophomore | Magnolia, AR | Southern Arkansas |
| Aedan Lewis | 12 | G | 6'4" | 205 | Junior | Pensacola, FL | Southwestern (TX) |
| Keyne Costa | 20 | F | 6'8" | 215 | Sophomore | Brussels, Belgium | Northeastern Oklahoma A&M |
| Aaron Goldstein | 21 | G | 6'0" | 180 | Senior | Staten Island, NY | College of Staten Island |
| Davaughn Hueitt | 24 | F | 6'9" | 220 | Sophomore | Chula Vista, CA | Hannibal–LaGrange |

=== Recruiting classes ===
==== 2026 recruiting class ====
College recruiting
| Name | Hometown | School | Height | Weight | Commit date |
|---|---|---|---|---|---|
| Lenni Kunzewitsch; SF | Germany, DEU | Ratiopharm Ulm | 6 ft 9 in (2.06 m) | 205 lb (93 kg) | May 2, 2026 |
| Lenni Kunzewitsch; SF | Recruit ratings: No ratings found | | | | |
| Diego Roman; PG | Switzerland, CHE | Switzerland | 6 ft 6 in (1.98 m) | 200 lb (91 kg) | Apr 8, 2026 |
| Diego Roman; PG | Recruit ratings: No ratings found | | | | |
Overall recruit ranking:
Note: In many cases, Scout, Rivals, 247Sports, On3, and ESPN may conflict in their listings of height and weight.; In these cases, the average was taken. ESPN grades are on a 100-point scale.; Sources: "2026 Team Ranking". Rivals.

==== 2027 recruiting class ====
College recruiting (2027)
| Name | Hometown | School | Height | Weight | Commit date |
|---|---|---|---|---|---|
Overall recruit ranking:
Note: In many cases, Scout, Rivals, 247Sports, On3, and ESPN may conflict in their listings of height and weight.; In these cases, the average was taken. ESPN grades are on a 100-point scale.; Sources: "2027 Team Ranking". Rivals.

== Roster ==
2026–27 South Alabama Jaguars men's basketball team
Players
Coaches

| Pos. | # | Name | Height | Weight | Year | Previous school | Hometown |
|---|---|---|---|---|---|---|---|
| G | 0 | Samuel Shoptaw | 6 ft 2 in (1.88 m) | 195 lb (88 kg) | So | Windermere Prep | London, KY |
| G | 1 | Jalen Langsy | 6 ft 1 in (1.85 m) | 185 lb (84 kg) | Jr | Shakopee HS; Northwestern (IA) | Shakopee, MN |
| G | 3 | Desmond Williams | 6 ft 3 in (1.91 m) | 185 lb (84 kg) | So | Baker HS | Mobile, AL |
| F | 4 | Stephen Williams | 6 ft 9 in (2.06 m) | 245 lb (111 kg) | Jr | Escambia County HS; Coastal Alabama CC | Atmore, AL |
| F | 6 | Lenni Kunzewitsch | 6 ft 10 in (2.08 m) | 220 lb (100 kg) | Jr | Ratiopharm Ulm | Gotha, Germany |
| F | 7 | Owen Kenney | 6 ft 7 in (2.01 m) | 225 lb (102 kg) | Jr | Orangeville Prep; Ottawa | Barrie, ON |
| F | 9 | Peyton Law | 6 ft 7 in (2.01 m) | 220 lb (100 kg) | GS | Calhoun HS; Freed–Hardeman | Calhoun, GA |
| F | 10 | Roderick Williams Jr. | 6 ft 6 in (1.98 m) | 230 lb (104 kg) | So | Magnolia HS; Southern Arkansas | Magnolia, AR |
| G | 12 | Aedan Lewis | 6 ft 4 in (1.93 m) | 205 lb (93 kg) | Jr | Lake Creek HS (TX); Southwestern (TX) | Pensacola, FL |
| G | 13 | Diego Roman | 6 ft 8 in (2.03 m) | 215 lb (98 kg) | Fr | Starwings Basket Regio Basel | Barcelona, Spain |
| F | 20 | Keyne Costa | 6 ft 8 in (2.03 m) | 215 lb (98 kg) | So | Ascension Life; Northeastern Oklahoma A&M | Brussels, Belgium |
| G | 21 | Aaron Goldstein | 6 ft 0 in (1.83 m) | 180 lb (82 kg) | Sr | Xaverian HS; College of Staten Island | Staten Island, NY |
| F | 24 | Davaughn Hueitt | 6 ft 9 in (2.06 m) | 220 lb (100 kg) | So | Mater Dei Catholic HS; Hannibal–LaGrange | Chula Vista, CA |
| F | 35 | Alexey Sereda | 7 ft 0 in (2.13 m) | 215 lb (98 kg) | Fr | BC Enisey Krasnoyarsk | Krasnoyarsk, Russia |

Head coach

- Richie Riley (Eastern Kentucky)

Assistant coach(es)

- Orin Bailey Jr. (Houston)
- John Aiken (Southern Maine)
- Mark Rutledge (Central Arkansas)
- Will Braden (Sewanee)

Legend

- (C) Team captain
- (S) Suspended
- (I) Ineligible
- (W) Walk-on
- Injured
- Current redshirt

Roster

== Schedule and results ==
| Date time, TV | Rank^{#} | Opponent^{#} | Result | Record | High points | High rebounds | High assists | Site (attendance) city, state |
Exhibition
| October 29, 2026*; 6:00 p.m. | | Mississippi College | W 99–83 | | – | – | – | Mitchell Center; Mobile, AL |
Regular season
| November 2, 2026*; 7:00 p.m., ESPN+ | | Ohio; MAC-SBC Challenge | L 77–86 | 0–1 | 25 – Langsy | 8 – S. Williams | 5 – Roman | Mitchell Center (1,537); Mobile, AL |
| November 5, 2026*; 7:00 p.m. | | Jacksonville State | W 83–80 ^{OT} | 1–1 | 27 – S. Williams | 13 – S. Williams | 7 – Roman | Mitchell Center (1,641); Mobile, AL |
| November 10, 2026*; 6:00 p.m., ESPN+ | | at UCF | W 76–69 | 1–2 | 20 – Goldstein | 11 – S. Williams | 4 – Langsy | Addition Financial Arena (5,108); Orlando, FL |
| November 12, 2026*; 7:00 p.m., YouTube | | vs. Loyola Marymount; Coastal Classic | W 79–72 | 2–2 | 27 – Langsy | 5 – S. Williams | 7 – Langsy | Pensacola Bay Center (442); Pensacola, FL |
| November 14, 2026*; 5:00 p.m., ESPN+ | | at North Texas | L 65–66 | 2–3 | 15 – Tied | 6 – Tied | 3 – Tied | The Super Pit (2,328); Denton, TX |
| November 17, 2026*; 6:00 p.m., ESPN+ | | Spring Hill | | | | | | Mitchell Center; Mobile, AL |
| November 20, 2026*; 7:00 p.m. | | at SMU | | | | | | Moody Coliseum; Dallas, TX |
| November 22, 2026*; 2:00 p.m., ESPN+ | | West Florida | | | | | | Mitchell Center; Mobile, AL |
| November 24, 2026*; 7:00 p.m., ESPN+ | | Florida A&M | | | | | | Mitchell Center; Mobile, AL |
| November 27, 2026*; 1:00 p.m. | | vs. Fresno State; Second Line Showcase | | | | | | Convocation Center; New Orleans, LA |
| November 28, 2026*; 5:00 p.m. | | vs. South Dakota State; Second Line Showcase | | | | | | Convocation Center; New Orleans, LA |
| December 5, 2026*; 2:00 p.m., ESPN+ | | UTSA | | | | | | Mitchell Center; Mobile, AL |
| December 16, 2026 | | at Arkansas State | | | | | | First National Bank Arena; Jonesboro, AR |
| December 19, 2026; 4:30 p.m., ESPN+ | | Old Dominion | | | | | | Mitchell Center; Mobile, AL |
| December 28, 2026*; 6:00 p.m., ESPN+ | | Mobile | | | | | | Mitchell Center; Mobile, AL |
| December 31, 2026; 3:00 p.m., ESPN+ | | at Marshall | | | | | | Cam Henderson Center; Huntington, WV |
| January 2, 2027; 12:00 p.m., ESPN+ | | at Appalachian State | | | | | | Holmes Center; Boone, NC |
| January 7, 2027; 7:00 p.m., ESPN+ | | Georgia Southern | | | | | | Mitchell Center; Mobile, AL |
| January 9, 2027; 3:00 p.m., ESPN+ | | Coastal Carolina | | | | | | Mitchell Center; Mobile, AL |
| January 14, 2027; 6:30 p.m., ESPN+ | | at Louisiana–Monroe | | | | | | Fant–Ewing Coliseum; Monroe, LA |
| January 16, 2027; 3:00 p.m., ESPN+ | | Louisiana Tech | | | | | | Mitchell Center; Mobile, AL |
| January 21, 2027; 7:30 p.m., ESPN+ | | at Louisiana | | | | | | Cajundome; Lafayette, LA |
| January 23, 2027; 4:30 p.m., ESPN+ | | Southern Miss | | | | | | Mitchell Center; Mobile, AL |
| January 27, 2027; 6:00 p.m., ESPN+ | | at Troy | | | | | | Trojan Arena; Troy, AL |
| January 30, 2027; 3:00 p.m., ESPN+ | | at Louisiana Tech | | | | | | Thomas Assembly Center; Ruston, LA |
| February 3, 2027; 7:00 p.m., ESPN+ | | Arkansas State | | | | | | Mitchell Center; Mobile, AL |
| February 6, 2027* | | vs. TBA; MAC-SBC Challenge | | | | | | TBA; TBA |
| February 13, 2027; 12:00 p.m., ESPN+ | | at Georgia State | | | | | | GSU Convocation Center; Atlanta, GA |
| February 18, 2027; 7:00 p.m., ESPN+ | | Troy | | | | | | Mitchell Center; Mobile, AL |
| February 20, 2027; 3:00 p.m., ESPN+ | | Louisiana | | | | | | Mitchell Center; Mobile, AL |
| February 24, 2027; 7:00 p.m., ESPN+ | | Louisiana–Monroe | | | | | | Mitchell Center; Mobile, AL |
| February 26, 2027; 8:00 p.m., ESPN+ | | at Southern Miss | | | | | | Reed Green Coliseum; Hattiesburg, MS |
Sun Belt tournament
| March 2–8, 2027 | | vs. TBA | | | | | | Pensacola Bay Center; Pensacola, FL |
*Non-conference game. ^{#}Rankings from AP Poll. (#) Tournament seedings in parentheses. All times are in Central Time.
