= Charles L. English =

American diplomat

Charles Lewis English (born 1951) is a former United States Ambassador to Bosnia and Herzegovina.

Charles L. English was sworn in as United States Ambassador to Bosnia and Herzegovina on September 20, 2007 and presented his credentials to the Government of Bosnia and Herzegovina on October 4, 2007. Prior to his appointment, Ambassador English served as the deputy director of the Office of Career Development and Assignments in the Bureau of Human Resources at the U.S. Department of State from 2006 to 2007. As deputy director, he was responsible for effecting the assignments of all members of the U.S. Foreign Service.

From 2003 to 2006, Ambassador English served as the director of the Office of South Central European Affairs in the Bureau for European and Eurasian Affairs, where he was responsible for coordinating the State Department's approach to relations with countries in the Western Balkans. From 2002 to 2003, he served as the director of the Office of European Union and Regional Affairs in the Bureau for European and Eurasian Affairs.

Ambassador English received a bachelor's degree from Princeton University and studied international economics at the graduate level at New York University. Ambassador English is also a graduate of Xaverian High School in Brooklyn, New York. He is married to Patricia Espey-English and they have two children, Cathryn and Matthew.

Diplomatic posts
Preceded by Douglas L. McElhaney	United States Ambassador to Bosnia and Herzegovina; 2007–2010	Succeeded by Patrick S. Moon
