= Maureen Cormack =

American diplomat (born 1957)

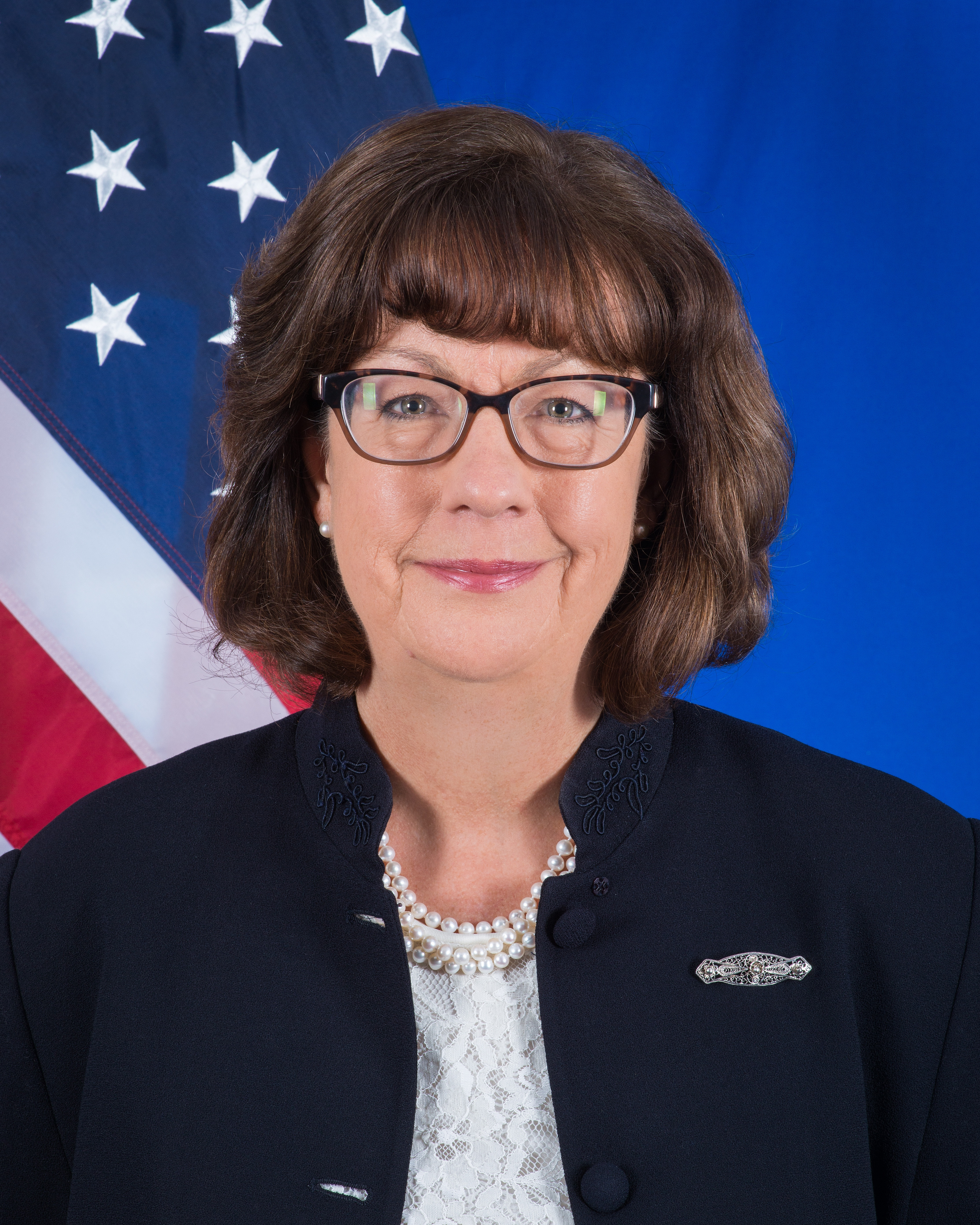

Acting Assistant Secretary of State for European and Eurasian Affairs
- In office August 2, 2021 – September 28, 2021
- President: Joe Biden
- Preceded by: Philip T. Reeker
- Succeeded by: Karen Donfried

United States Ambassador to Bosnia and Herzegovina
- In office January 16, 2015 – January 16, 2019
- President: Barack Obama; Donald Trump
- Preceded by: Patrick Moon
- Succeeded by: Eric Nelson

Personal details
- Born: 1957 (age 68–69)
- Education: University of Illinois, Urbana-Champaign; University of Chicago

Maureen Elizabeth Cormack (born 1957) is an American diplomat who served as the United States Ambassador to Bosnia and Herzegovina from 2015 to 2019. She served as acting Assistant Secretary of State for European and Eurasian Affairs from August to September 2021.

== Education and early career ==
Cormack received her B.A. in performing arts management from the University of Illinois. She worked for a Chicago law firm and the Ravinia Festival, an outdoor music series near Chicago, in fundraising, public relations, and artistic management. Her personal love of the arts continues today, and much of her career in the Foreign Service has been spent in public and cultural affairs. In an interview in Bosnia, she said "I am a fan of the symphony, the opera and the ballet," which, in Sarajevo, she enjoys at the restored National Theater. She then attended the University of Chicago, earning an M.A. in international relations in 1989.

== Diplomatic career ==
Ambassador Cormack joined the Foreign Service in 1989, and in early assignments served as Director of the American Centers in Kwangju, South Korea and Warsaw, Poland. She then served as Deputy Cultural Attaché at the U.S. embassy in Paris, and as Consul at the American Presence Post (APP) in western France.

In 2005, Cormack returned to Washington, DC and became a Pearson Fellow, working on Capitol Hill. The Pearson Fellowships give Foreign Service officers the chance to spend a year learning about the work of Congress. She worked with the House Homeland Security Committee.

In 2006, Cormack moved back to the State Department and became deputy director for Korean Affairs, where she served until 2009. Towards the end of her tenure, she helped deal with the arrest of two American journalists, Euna Lee and Laura Ling, by North Korea, who were eventually freed.

Cormack served as director of the Office of Western European Affairs until 2010. She was then named executive assistant in the Office of the Under Secretary for Public Diplomacy and Public Affairs. In July 2011, Cormack became principal deputy coordinator of the Bureau of International Information Programs. Prior to arriving in Sarajevo, she served in Washington D.C. as the Chief of Staff to the Special Presidential Envoy for the Global Coalition to Counter ISIL.

=== United States Ambassador Bosnia and Herzegovina ===
On November 21, 2013, President Barack Obama announced his intent to nominate Maureen Cormack, a career Foreign Service officer, as ambassador to Bosnia and Herzegovina. On January 6, 2014, her nomination was received in the U.S. Senate. On November 19, 2014, she was confirmed by the Senate by voice vote. She presented her credentials on January 16, 2015.

On August 23, 2018, President Donald Trump nominated Eric Nelson of Texas to be U.S. ambassador to Bosnia and Herzegovina. On January 16, 2019, Cormack's mission terminated. On February 19, 2019, Nelson presented his credentials to the Chairman of BiH Presidency as Ambassador of the United States, succeeding Cormack as the U.S. ambassador.

=== Bureau of European and Eurasian Affairs ===
Cormack served as a Distinguished Senior Fellow at the German Marshall Fund and Senior Advisor for the 2019 Global Entrepreneurship Summit, co-hosted by the United States and The Netherlands in The Hague until August 2019. From August 2019 to July 2021, she served as Principal Deputy Assistant Secretary of the Bureau of European and Eurasian Affairs. From August 2, 2021 to September 28, 2021, she served as acting Assistant Secretary of the Bureau of European and Eurasian Affairs.

Diplomatic posts
Preceded by Patrick Moon	United States Ambassador to Bosnia and Herzegovina; 2015–2019	Succeeded by Eric Nelson
