= 2026–27 Arkansas State Red Wolves men's basketball team =

American college basketball season

2026–27 Arkansas State Red Wolves men's basketball
- Conference: Sun Belt Conference
- Record: 1–1 (0–0 Sun Belt)
- Head coach: Ryan Pannone (2nd season)
- Assistant coaches: Jordan Fair; Rashaad Richardson; Hayden Sowers; Dean Cooper; Max Thorpe
- Home arena: First National Bank Arena

2026–27 Sun Belt Conference men's basketball standings
	Conf.				Overall
Team	W		L	PCT	W		L	PCT
Old Dominion	0	–	0	–	3	–	0	1.000
Appalachian State	0	–	0	–	2	–	1	.667
Louisiana Tech	0	–	0	–	2	–	1	.667
Arkansas State	0	–	0	–	1	–	1	.500
Georgia Southern	0	–	0	–	1	–	1	.500
South Alabama	0	–	0	–	1	–	1	.500
Southern Miss	0	–	0	–	1	–	1	.500
Coastal Carolina	0	–	0	–	1	–	2	.333
Georgia State	0	–	0	–	1	–	2	.333
Louisiana	0	–	0	–	1	–	2	.333
Marshall	0	–	0	–	1	–	2	.333
Louisiana–Monroe	0	–	0	–	1	–	2	.333
James Madison	0	–	0	–	0	–	2	.000
Troy	0	–	0	–	0	–	2	.000
† 2027 Sun Belt tournament winner As of November 10, 2026; Rankings from AP poll

The 2026–27 Arkansas State Red Wolves men's basketball team represent Arkansas State University in the 2026–27 NCAA Division I men's basketball season. The Red Wolves, led by second-year head coach Ryan Pannone, play their home games at the First National Bank Arena in Jonesboro, Arkansas as members of the Sun Belt Conference.

== Previous season ==
The Red Wolves finished the 2025–26 season 20–12, 11–7 in Sun Belt play to finish tied for 2nd place, 7th seed in the Sun Belt tournament. They were defeated by Georgia Southern in the third round.

The Red Wolves were not invited to a postseason tournament.

== Preseason ==
In September 2026, Pannone added former NBA player Corey Brewer to his staff as an assistant coach. A native of Portland, Tennessee, Brewer won back-to-back national championships at Florida in 2006 and 2007, was the seventh overall pick in the 2007 NBA draft, and won an NBA championship with the Dallas Mavericks in 2011 during a 13-year playing career. He arrived in Jonesboro after six seasons with the New Orleans Pelicans, first as a player development coach under Stan Van Gundy and then as an assistant coach under Willie Green beginning in 2024–25. Pannone, who had previously worked alongside Brewer with the Pelicans, said he had long envisioned having Brewer on his staff if he became a Division I head coach.

=== Preseason Sun Belt Conference poll ===
The Red Wolves were picked to finish in first place in the conference's preseason coaches poll, receiving three first-place votes. Guards Layne Taylor and Tameron Ferguson were named to the conference preseason second team.

Coaches poll
Predicted finish	Team (1st place Votes)
1	Arkansas State - 182 (3)
2	James Madison - 176 (9)
3	Troy - 143
4	South Alabama - 136
5	Marshall - 125
6	Louisiana - 117
7	Southern Miss - 109 (2)
8	App State - 105
9	Georgia Southern - 85
10	Georgia State - 79
11	Old Dominion - 76
12	Louisiana Tech - 64
13	Coastal Carolina - 58
14	ULM - 15

== Roster ==
2026–27 Arkansas State Red Wolves men's basketball team
Players
Coaches

Pos.	#	Name	Height	Weight	Year	Previous school	Hometown
G	0	Chaz Watson	6 ft 3 in (1.91 m)	187 lb (85 kg)	Jr	Indian Hills Community College	Kansas City, Missouri
G	1	Aaron McGee	6 ft 3 in (1.91 m)	179 lb (81 kg)	Fr	Gillion Academy	Melbourne, Florida
G	2	Tameron Ferguson	6 ft 4 in (1.93 m)	179 lb (81 kg)	Jr	Augustana (SD)	St. Cloud, Minnesota
G	3	Royal Blue Smith	6 ft 4 in (1.93 m)	189 lb (86 kg)	So	Gillion Academy	Parkland, Florida
F	4	Delang Muon	6 ft 8 in (2.03 m)	203 lb (92 kg)	Sr	New Mexico Junior College	Frankston, Victoria, Australia
G	5	CJ Geathers	6 ft 5 in (1.96 m)	190 lb (86 kg)	So	Chapel Hill HS	Lithia Springs, Georgia
F	6	Grayson Bennett	6 ft 8 in (2.03 m)	198 lb (90 kg)	So	La Lumiere	Houston, Texas
G	7	Jordan Pyke	6 ft 7 in (2.01 m)	205 lb (93 kg)	Sr	Incarnate Word	Greensboro, North Carolina
G	10	Anthony Hester	6 ft 6 in (1.98 m)	200 lb (91 kg)	Fr	Mills University Studies HS	Little Rock, Arkansas
F	11	Rho Omed	6 ft 11 in (2.11 m)	210 lb (95 kg)	So	The Academy Prep	Calgary, Alberta
G	13	Diggy Coleman	5 ft 11 in (1.8 m)	193 lb (88 kg)	Fr	Dothan HS	Marianna, Florida
F	14	Amadou Doumbia	7 ft 0 in (2.13 m)	212 lb (96 kg)	Jr	North Carolina A&T	Bamako, Mali
G	33	Layne Taylor	5 ft 11 in (1.8 m)	176 lb (80 kg)	Jr	Murray State	Farmington, Arkansas
F	34	Aliou Maiga	6 ft 8 in (2.03 m)	204 lb (93 kg)	Jr	South Plains College	Bamako, Mali
F	43	Moussa Sy	7 ft 0 in (2.13 m)	204 lb (93 kg)	Fr	West Oaks Academy	Dakar, Senegal

Head coach

- Ryan Pannone (South Florida)

Assistant coach(es)

- Jordan Fair (St. Petersburg)
- Hayden Sowers (Mississippi)
- Corey Brewer (Florida)
- Dean Cooper (Aquinas)
- Rashaad Richardson (Georgia State)
- Max Thorpe (Florida State)

Legend

- (C) Team captain
- (S) Suspended
- (I) Ineligible
- (W) Walk-on
- Injured
- Current redshirt

Roster
Last update: 1 November 2026

== Schedule and results ==
Date time, TV	Rank^{#}	Opponent^{#}	Result	Record	High points	High rebounds	High assists	Site (attendance) city, state
Regular season
November 2, 2026*; 7:00 p.m., ESPN+		Toledo; MAC–SBC Challenge	W 71–70	1–0	20 – Ferguson	9 – Tied	4 – Tied	First National Bank Arena (5,486); Jonesboro, AR
November 6, 2026*; 6:30 p.m., SECN+		at No. 20 Alabama	L 86–101	1–1	20 – Taylor	10 – Doumbia	6 – Tied	Coleman Coliseum (11,291); Tuscaloosa, AL
November 10, 2026*; 7:00 p.m., ESPN+		UT Martin						First National Bank Arena; Jonesboro, AR
November 14, 2026*; 7:00 p.m., ESPN+		Dillard						First National Bank Arena; Jonesboro, AR
November 18, 2026*; 7:00 p.m., ESPN+		Arkansas–Pine Bluff						First National Bank Arena; Jonesboro, AR
November 23, 2026*; 2:30 p.m., ESPN+		vs. Southern Utah; FIU Thanksgiving Multi-Team Event						Ocean Bank Convocation Center; University Park, FL
November 24, 2026*; 2:30 p.m., ESPN+		vs. Long Beach State; FIU Thanksgiving Multi-Team Event						Ocean Bank Convocation Center; University Park, FL
November 25, 2026*; 2:30 p.m., ESPN+		at FIU; FIU Thanksgiving Multi-Team Event						Ocean Bank Convocation Center; University Park, FL
November 29, 2026*; 1:00 p.m., ESPN+		Rice						First National Bank Arena; Jonesboro, AR
December 3, 2026*; 7:00 p.m., ESPN+		Missouri State						First National Bank Arena; Jonesboro, AR
December 6, 2026*; 2:00 p.m., ESPN+		Little Rock						First National Bank Arena; Jonesboro, AR
December 12, 2026*; 2:00 p.m., Midco Sports Plus		at St. Thomas						Lee and Penny Anderson Arena; St. Paul, MN
December 16, 2026; 7:00 p.m., ESPN+		South Alabama						First National Bank Arena; Jonesboro, AR
December 19, 2026; 2:00 p.m., ESPN+		Georgia Southern						First National Bank Arena; Jonesboro, AR
December 22, 2026*; 7:30 p.m., ESPN+		Crowley's Ridge						First National Bank Arena; Jonesboro, AR
December 31, 2026; 1:00 p.m., ESPN+		at James Madison						Atlantic Union Bank Center; Harrisonburg, VA
January 2, 2027; 3:00 p.m., ESPN+		at Marshall						Cam Henderson Center; Huntington, WV
January 7, 2027; 7:00 p.m.		Appalachian State						First National Bank Arena; Jonesboro, AR
January 9, 2027; 2:00 p.m., ESPN+		Georgia State						First National Bank Arena; Jonesboro, AR
January 14, 2027; 6:30 p.m., ESPN+		at Louisiana Tech						Thomas Assembly Center; Ruston, LA
January 16, 2027; 2:30 p.m., ESPN+		Southern Miss						First National Bank Arena; Jonesboro, AR
January 23, 2027; 6:00 p.m., ESPN+		at Old Dominion						Chartway Arena; Norfolk, VA
January 27, 2027; 7:00 p.m., ESPN+		Louisiana						First National Bank Arena; Jonesboro, AR
January 30, 2027; 3:33 p.m., ESPN+		at Troy						Trojan Arena; Troy, AL
February 3, 2027; 7:00 p.m., ESPN+		at South Alabama						Mitchell Center; Mobile, AL
February 6, 2027*; TBD, ESPN+		at TBD; MAC–SBC Challenge						TBD; TBD
February 10, 2027; 7:00 p.m., ESPN+		ULM						First National Bank Arena; Jonesboro, AR
February 13, 2027; 2:00 p.m., ESPN+		Troy						First National Bank Arena; Jonesboro, AR
February 17, 2027; 7:00 p.m., ESPN+		at Louisiana						Cajundome; Lafayette, LA
February 20, 2027; 2:30 p.m., ESPN+		at ULM						Fant–Ewing Coliseum; Monroe, LA
February 24, 2027; 7:30 p.m., ESPN+		at Southern Miss						Reed Green Coliseum; Hattiesburg, MS
February 26, 2027; 7:30 p.m.		Louisiana Tech						First National Bank Arena; Jonesboro, AR
*Non-conference game. ^{#}Rankings from AP Poll. (#) Tournament seedings in parentheses. All times are in Central.
