= 2026–27 James Madison Dukes men's basketball team =

American college basketball season

2026–27 James Madison Dukes men's basketball
- Conference: Sun Belt Conference
- Record: 0–1 (0–0 Sun Belt)
- Head coach: Preston Spradlin (3rd season)
- Associate head coach: Dominic Lombardi
- Assistant coaches: Cason Burk; Dionte Ferguson; Calvin Baker; Brendan Foley
- Home arena: Atlantic Union Bank Center

2026–27 Sun Belt Conference men's basketball standings
	Conf.				Overall
Team	W		L	PCT	W		L	PCT
Old Dominion	0	–	0	–	5	–	1	.833
Appalachian State	0	–	0	–	4	–	1	.800
Louisiana Tech	0	–	0	–	4	–	2	.667
Arkansas State	0	–	0	–	3	–	2	.600
James Madison	0	–	0	–	3	–	2	.600
Southern Miss	0	–	0	–	3	–	3	.500
South Alabama	0	–	0	–	3	–	4	.429
Troy	0	–	0	–	2	–	3	.400
Coastal Carolina	0	–	0	–	2	–	4	.333
Georgia Southern	0	–	0	–	2	–	4	.333
Georgia State	0	–	0	–	2	–	4	.333
Marshall	0	–	0	–	2	–	4	.333
Louisiana–Monroe	0	–	0	–	2	–	6	.250
Louisiana	0	–	0	–	1	–	3	.250
† 2027 Sun Belt tournament winner As of November 22, 2026; Rankings from AP poll

The 2026–27 James Madison Dukes men's basketball team represents James Madison University during the 2026–27 NCAA Division I men's basketball season. The Dukes, led by third-year head coach Preston Spradlin, play their home games at the Atlantic Union Bank Center in Harrisonburg, Virginia as members of the Sun Belt Conference.

== Previous season ==
The Dukes finished the 2025–26 season 18–15, 9–9 in Sun Belt play, to finish in a tie for eighth place. In the Sun Belt tournament, the Dukes defeated Louisiana in the second round before falling to Southern Miss in the third round.

== Preseason ==
=== Preseason Sun Belt Conference poll ===
The Dukes were picked to finish in second place in the conference's preseason coaches poll, receiving nine first-place votes. In the preseason All-Sun Belt teams, James Madison's three honorees were the most of any team, with sophomore guard Preston Fowler and junior guard Gage Lattimore on the Second Team, and junior guard K.J. Windham on the Third Team.

Coaches poll
Predicted finish	Team (1st place Votes)
1	Arkansas State - 182 (3)
2	James Madison - 176 (9)
3	Troy - 143
4	South Alabama - 136
5	Marshall - 125
6	Louisiana - 117
7	Southern Miss - 109 (2)
8	App State - 105
9	Georgia Southern - 85
10	Georgia State - 79
11	Old Dominion - 76
12	Louisiana Tech - 64
13	Coastal Carolina - 58
14	ULM - 15

== Roster ==
2026–27 James Madison Dukes men's basketball team
Players
Coaches

Pos.	#	Name	Height	Weight	Year	Previous school	Hometown
F	0	Marley Curtis	6 ft 7 in (2.01 m)	230 lb (104 kg)	So	North Dakota	St. Louis Park, Minnesota
G	1	Paul Jones III	6 ft 3 in (1.91 m)	174 lb (79 kg)	Jr	Winthrop	Suffolk, Virginia
G/F	2	Emarquis Jones	6 ft 5 in (1.96 m)	200 lb (91 kg)	Sr	Goldey–Beacom	Brooklyn, New York
G	3	Cavan Reilly (5th)	6 ft 4 in (1.93 m)	195 lb (88 kg)	Sr	Delaware	Lovettsville, Virginia
G/F	4	Adrian Myers	6 ft 6 in (1.98 m)	200 lb (91 kg)	Sr	San Jose State	Stephens City, Virginia
F	5	Jacob Hogarth	6 ft 9 in (2.06 m)	245 lb (111 kg)	Jr	Gardner–Webb	Brooklyn, New York
G	6	Ace Meeks	6 ft 0 in (1.83 m)	180 lb (82 kg)	Fr	DeMatha Catholic High School	Bowie, Maryland
F	8	Joseph Brown	6 ft 6 in (1.98 m)	—	So	Clarke	Cumming, Georgia
G	10	Matthew Owens	6 ft 3 in (1.91 m)	160 lb (73 kg)	Fr	Luray High School	Luray, Virginia
G	11	Gage Lattimore	6 ft 1 in (1.85 m)	195 lb (88 kg)	Jr	North Carolina Central	Greensboro, North Carolina
F	12	Garrett Sundra	6 ft 11 in (2.11 m)	235 lb (107 kg)	Jr	Notre Dame	Ashburn, Virginia
F	13	Preston Fowler	6 ft 8 in (2.03 m)	230 lb (104 kg)	So	Brewster Academy	Vernon, Connecticut
G	15	Brandon Lee	6 ft 4 in (1.93 m)	200 lb (91 kg)	So	Illinois	San Juan, Puerto Rico
F	23	AJ Evans	6 ft 9 in (2.06 m)	220 lb (100 kg)	Fr	Xavier High School	Cedar Rapids, Iowa
G	24	K.J. Windham	6 ft 3 in (1.91 m)	195 lb (88 kg)	Jr	Northwestern	Indianapolis, Indiana

Head coach

- Preston Spradlin (Alice Lloyd)

Assistant coach(es)

- Dominic Lombardi (Indiana (PA))
- Calvin Baker (Virginia)
- Cason Burk (Jackson State)
- Dionte Ferguson (South Alabama)
- Brendan Foley (Kansas State)

Legend

- (C) Team captain
- (S) Suspended
- (I) Ineligible
- (W) Walk-on
- (5th) Fifth-year senior
- Injured
- Current redshirt

Roster
Last update: November 6, 2026

== Schedule and results ==
Date time, TV	Rank^{#}	Opponent^{#}	Result	Record	High points	High rebounds	High assists	Site (attendance) city, state
Exhibition
October 18, 2026*; 2:00 p.m.		Richmond	W 90–81	–	–	–	–	Atlantic Union Bank Center; Harrisonburg, VA
October 25, 2026*; 2:00 p.m.		at VCU	L 87–92	–	–	–	–	Siegel Center (5,969); Richmond, VA
Regular season
November 2, 2026*; 7:00 p.m., ESPN+		Miami (OH); MAC–SBC Challenge	L 77–86	0–1	14 – Jones III	8 – Sundra	2 – Tied	Atlantic Union Bank Center (4,071); Harrisonburg, VA
November 6, 2026*; 7:00 p.m., SEC Network		at No. 23 Kentucky	L 80–89	0–2	26 – Lee	6 – Myers	5 – Windham	Rupp Arena (19,292); Lexington, KY
November 11, 2026*; 7:00 p.m., ESPN+		at Delaware	W 71–61	1–2	19 – Myers	11 – Sundra	4 – Windham	Bob Carpenter Center (1,694); Newark, DE
November 15, 2026*; 4:00 p.m., ESPN+		Mercyhurst	W 80–71	2–2	21 – Lee	12 – Fowler	4 – Windham	Atlantic Union Bank Center (2,888); Harrisonburg, VA
November 18, 2026*; 7:00 p.m.		at Towson	W 70–52	3–2	21 – Lee	7 – Myers	3 – Sundra	SECU Arena (2,630); Towson, MD
November 21, 2026*; 2:00 p.m., ESPN+		Virginia–Lynchburg	W 136–45	4–2	20 – Fowler	10 – Sundra	7 – Jones	Atlantic Union Bank Center (2,417); Harrisonburg, VA
November 24, 2026*; 7:00 p.m., ESPN+		Charleston Southern						Atlantic Union Bank Center; Harrisonburg, VA
November 29, 2026*; 4:00 p.m., ESPN+		William & Mary						Atlantic Union Bank Center; Harrisonburg, VA
December 3, 2026*; 7:00 p.m.		at Elon						Schar Center; Elon, NC
December 6, 2026*; 4:00 p.m., ESPN+		Longwood						Atlantic Union Bank Center; Harrisonburg, VA
December 9, 2026*; 7:00 p.m.		at North Carolina A&T						Corbett Sports Center; Greensboro, NC
December 16, 2026; 7:00 p.m., ESPN+		Georgia State						Atlantic Union Bank Center; Harrisonburg, VA
December 19, 2026; 3:00 p.m., ESPN+		at Southern Miss						Reed Green Coliseum; Hattiesburg, MS
December 22, 2026*; 3:00 p.m., ESPN+		Coppin State						Atlantic Union Bank Center; Harrisonburg, VA
December 28, 2026*; 7:00 p.m., ESPN+		Notre Dame (MD)						Atlantic Union Bank Center; Harrisonburg, VA
December 31, 2026; 2:00 p.m., ESPN+		Arkansas State						Atlantic Union Bank Center; Harrisonburg, VA
January 2, 2027; 2:00 p.m., ESPN+		Troy						Atlantic Union Bank Center; Harrisonburg, VA
January 7, 2027; 7:30 p.m., ESPN+		at Louisiana Tech						Thomas Assembly Center; Ruston, LA
January 9, 2027; 4:00 p.m., ESPN+		at Louisiana						Cajundome; Lafayette, LA
January 13, 2027; 7:00 p.m., ESPN+		at Georgia Southern						Jack and Ruth Ann Hill Convocation Center; Statesboro, GA
January 16, 2027; 2:00 p.m., ESPN+		Old Dominion						Atlantic Union Bank Center; Harrisonburg, VA
January 21, 2027; 7:00 p.m., ESPN+		Marshall						Atlantic Union Bank Center; Harrisonburg, VA
January 23, 2027; 3:00 p.m., ESPN+		at Georgia State						GSU Convocation Center; Atlanta,GA
January 30, 2027; 5:00 p.m., ESPN+		Louisiana–Monroe						Atlantic Union Bank Center; Harrisonburg, VA
February 3, 2027; 6:00 p.m., ESPN+		at Coastal Carolina						HTC Center; Conway, SC
February 6, 2027*; TBD, ESPN+		at TBD; MAC–SBC Challenge						TBD; TBD
February 10, 2027; 7:00 p.m., ESPN+		Appalachian State						Atlantic Union Bank Center; Harrisonburg, VA
February 13, 2027; 7:00 p.m., ESPN+		at Marshall						Cam Henderson Center; Huntington, WV
February 17, 2027; 7:00 p.m., ESPN+		at Old Dominion						Chartway Arena; Norfolk, VA
February 20, 2027; 5:00 p.m., ESPN+		Coastal Carolina						Atlantic Union Bank Center; Harrisonburg, VA
February 23, 2027; 8:00 p.m., ESPN+		Georgia Southern						Atlantic Union Bank Center; Harrisonburg, VA
February 26, 2027; 6:30 p.m., ESPN+		at Appalachian State						Holmes Convocation Center; Boone, NC
Sun Belt Tournament
March 2–9, 2027		vs. TBA						Pensacola Bay Center; Pensacola, FL
*Non-conference game. ^{#}Rankings from AP Poll. (#) Tournament seedings in parentheses. All times are in Eastern Time.
