= 2026–27 Appalachian State Mountaineers men's basketball team =

American college basketball season

2026–27 Appalachian State Mountaineers men's basketball
- Conference: Sun Belt Conference
- Record: 4–1 (0–0 Sun Belt)
- Head coach: Dustin Kerns (8th season)
- Associate head coach: Bob Szorc
- Assistant coaches: Jonathan Mitchell; AJ Martin; Bradley Fey; Carson Barrett
- Home arena: Holmes Center

2026–27 Sun Belt Conference men's basketball standings
	Conf.				Overall
Team	W		L	PCT	W		L	PCT
Old Dominion	0	–	0	–	5	–	1	.833
Appalachian State	0	–	0	–	4	–	1	.800
Louisiana Tech	0	–	0	–	4	–	2	.667
Arkansas State	0	–	0	–	3	–	2	.600
James Madison	0	–	0	–	3	–	2	.600
Southern Miss	0	–	0	–	3	–	3	.500
South Alabama	0	–	0	–	3	–	4	.429
Troy	0	–	0	–	2	–	3	.400
Coastal Carolina	0	–	0	–	2	–	4	.333
Georgia Southern	0	–	0	–	2	–	4	.333
Georgia State	0	–	0	–	2	–	4	.333
Marshall	0	–	0	–	2	–	4	.333
Louisiana–Monroe	0	–	0	–	2	–	6	.250
Louisiana	0	–	0	–	1	–	3	.250
† 2027 Sun Belt tournament winner As of November 22, 2026; Rankings from AP poll

The 2026–27 Appalachian State Mountaineers men's basketball team will represent Appalachian State University in the 2026–27 NCAA Division I men's basketball season. The Mountaineers, led by eighth-year head coach Dustin Kerns, will play their home games at the Holmes Center in Boone, North Carolina as members of the Sun Belt Conference.

== Previous season ==
The Mountaineers finished the 2024–25 season 19–13, 11–7 in Sun Belt play. The Mountaineers lost to Southern Miss in the first round of the Sun Belt tournament.

== Off season ==
Appalachian State departures
Name	Number	Pos.	Height	Weight	Year	Hometown	Reason for Departure
Jacari Brim	6	G	6'2"	190	Freshman	Winston-Salem, NC	Transferred NC State
Alonzo Dodd	2	G	6'11	170	Senior	St. Paul, MN	Transferred to East Texas A&M
Jason Clarke Jr.	5	G	6'0"	177	Sophomore	Silver Spring, MD	Transferred to IU Indy
Kasen Jennings	13	G	6'5	210	GS Senior	Atlanta, GA	Graduated
Tre McKinnon	8	F	6'5"	177	Freshman	Wilmington, NC	Transferred to Saint Leo
Michael Marcus Jr.	44	F	6'9"	255	Sophomore	Indian Trail, NC	Transferred to George Mason
Jalen Tot	9	G	6'1"	270	GS Senior	Dallas, TX	Graduated, signed with Panachaiki Gymnastiki
Luke Wilson	3	C	6'9"	255	RS Sophomore	Augusta, GA	Transferred to Syracuse

=== 2026 recruiting class ===
Appalachian State 2026 recruiting class
Name	Number	Pos.	Height	Hometown	High school
Brian Chretien; G	Amiens, France	Saint-Chamond	7 ft 0 in (2.13 m)	235 lb (107 kg)	
Brian Chretien; G	Recruit ratings: (NR)				
Jackson Love; F	Boone, NC	Watauga	6 ft 3 in (1.91 m)	170 lb (77 kg)	
Jackson Love; F	Recruit ratings: (NR)				
Jonathan Moss; G	Owensboro, KY	Daviess County	6 ft 1 in (1.85 m)	178 lb (81 kg)	
Jonathan Moss; G	Recruit ratings: (NR)				
Overall recruit ranking:
Note: In many cases, Scout, Rivals, 247Sports, On3, and ESPN may conflict in their listings of height and weight.; In these cases, the average was taken. ESPN grades are on a 100-point scale.; Sources: "2026 Team Ranking". Rivals.

== Preseason ==
On October 18, 2026, the Sun Belt released its preseason coaches' poll. Appalachian was picked to finish eighth out of the fourteen teams.

=== Preseason Sun Belt Conference poll ===
Sun Belt Preseason Poll
Place	Team	Points
1	Arkansas State	182 (3)
2	James Madison	176 (9)
3	Troy	143
4	South Alabama	136
5	Marshall	125
6	Louisiana	117
7	Southern Miss	109 (2)
8	Appalachian State	105
9	Georgia Southern	85
10	Georgia State	79
11	Old Dominion	75
12	Louisiana Tech	64
13	Coastal Carolina	58
14	Louisiana-Monoroe	15

== Roster ==
2026–27 Appalachian State Mountaineers men's basketball team
Players
Coaches

Pos.	#	Name	Height	Weight	Year	Previous school	Hometown
G	0	KJ Vasser	6 ft 1 in (1.85 m)	180 lb (82 kg)	Sr	Yorkville Christian; Moberly Area	Chicago, IL
G	2	Jonathan Moss	6 ft 1 in (1.85 m)	178 lb (81 kg)	Fr	Daviess County HS	Owensboro, KY
G	3	Mason Costello	6 ft 4 in (1.93 m)	195 lb (88 kg)	Jr	Waukee HS; Indian Hills Community College	Waukee, IA
G	4	Eren Banks	6 ft 3 in (1.91 m)	190 lb (86 kg)	Sr	Putnam County HS; Georgia Southern	Eatonton, GA
G	5	Ben Kopetzki	6 ft 0 in (1.83 m)	185 lb (84 kg)	Sr	Miller School	Andover, MN
F	6	Da'Mori Lynch	6 ft 6 in (1.98 m)	200 lb (91 kg)	Jr	Quality Education Academy; Walters State Community College	Dillon, SC
G	7	Ted Neal	6 ft 7 in (2.01 m)	200 lb (91 kg)	So	Newton	Greensboro, GA
G	9	Jaylen Colon	6 ft 2 in (1.88 m)	177 lb (80 kg)	Sr	Kell HS; South Plains College	Acworth, GA
C	12	Rrezon Elezaj	7 ft 2 in (2.18 m)	210 lb (95 kg)	So	Besiktas JK; UConn	Peja, Kosovo
G	13	Corbin Allen	6 ft 5 in (1.96 m)	175 lb (79 kg)	So	Oak Park HS; Kansas	Kansas City, MO
G	14	Cameron O'Kelley	6 ft 3 in (1.91 m)	165 lb (75 kg)	Jr	Seneca Senior HS	Seneca, SC
G	17	Bryan Chretien	7 ft 0 in (2.13 m)	235 lb (107 kg)	Fr	Saint-Chamond	Amiens, France
F	21	Andrin Njock	6 ft 6 in (1.98 m)	205 lb (93 kg)	So	École nouvelle de la Suisse romande	Winterthur, Switzerland
F	22	Jackson Love	6 ft 3 in (1.91 m)	170 lb (77 kg)	Fr	Watauga HS	Boone, NC
F	23	Chad Moodie	6 ft 8 in (2.03 m)	225 lb (102 kg)	Sr	Grayson HS; Alabama A&M	Quebec City, Quebec
F	25	Hermann Koffi	6 ft 4 in (1.93 m)	203 lb (92 kg)	So	Polyvalente de Thetford Mines; Stonehill	Asheville, NC
G	32	Luke Ledford	6 ft 3 in (1.91 m)	190 lb (86 kg)	Sr	Broughton HS	Raleigh, NC
F	33	Grant Clayton	6 ft 7 in (2.01 m)	220 lb (100 kg)	So	A. C. Reynolds HS	Asheville, NC

Head coach

- Dustin Kerns (Clemson)

Assistant coach(es)

- Bob Szorc (St. John's)
- Jonathan Mitchell (Florida)
- AJ Clark (Pfeiffer)
- Bradley Fey (DePaul)
- Carson Barrett (Purdue)

Legend

- (C) Team captain
- (S) Suspended
- (I) Ineligible
- (W) Walk-on
- Injured
- Current redshirt

Roster
Last update: November 8, 2026

== Schedule ==
Date time, TV	Rank^{#}	Opponent^{#}	Result	Record	High points	High rebounds	High assists	Site (attendance) city, state
Exhibition
Octobers 17, 2026*; 1:00 p.m.		at Winthrop	W 76–67		24 – Banks	10 – Njock	5 – Colon	Winthrop Coliseum; Rock Hill, SC
Octobers 17, 2026*; 6:30 p.m.		Western Carolina	L 76–83		–	–	–	Holmes Center; Boone, NC
Non-conference regular season
November 2, 2026*; 6:00 a.m., YouTube		vs. Merrimack; Field of 68 Opening Day Marathon	W 63-49	1–0	14 – Colon	7 – Elezaj	5 – Banks	Rock Hill Sports & Events Center; Rock Hill, SC
November 4, 2026*; 7:30 p.m., ESPN+		Christendom	W 108–43	2–0	15 – Costello	6 – Allen	5 – Colon	Holmes Center (844); Boone, NC
November 9, 2026*; 9:00 p.m., SEC Network		at Auburn	L 53–75	2–1	19 – Banks	7 – Colon	3 – Banks	Neville Arena (9,121); Auburn, AL
November 13, 2026*; 7:00 p.m., ESPN+		at Charlotte	W 66–60	3–1	22 – Kopetzki	7 – Kopetzski	2 – Tied	Dale F. Halton Arena (5,772); Charlotte, NC
November 20, 2026*; 6:30 p.m., ESPN+		North Texas	W 81–75	4–1	22 – Lytch	8 – Kopetski	5 – Colon	Holmes Center (1,836); Boone, NC
November 23, 2026*; 11:00 a.m., ESPN2		vs. St. Bonaventure; ESPN Events Invitational						State Farm Field House; Kissimmee, FL
November 24, 2026*; 3:00 p.m., ESPN+		vs. Yale; ESPN Events Invitational						State Farm Field House; Kissimmee, FL
November 25, 2026*; 3:00 p.m., ESPNU		vs. Akron; ESPN Events Invitational						State Farm Field House; Kissimmee, FL
November 29, 2026*; 1:00 p.m., ESPN+		Darthmouth						Holmes Center; Boone, NC
December 1, 2026*; 6:30 p.m., ESPN+		Carolina						Holmes Center; Boone, NC
December 5, 2026*; 1:00 p.m., SECN		at Kentucky						Rupp Arena; Lexington, KY
December 13, 2026*; 1:00 p.m., ESPN+		East Carolina						Holmes Center; Boone, NC
Sun Belt regular season
December 19, 2026; 4:00 p.m., ESPN+		at Louisiana Tech						Thomas Assembly Center; Ruston, LA
December 21, 2026*; 2:00 p.m.		at Grambling State						Fredrick C. Hobdy Assembly Center; Grambling, LA
December 31, 2026; 1:00 p.m., ESPN+		Troy						Holmes Center; Boone, NC
January 2, 2027; 1:00 p.m., ESPN+		South Alabama						Holmes Center; Boone, NC
January 7, 2027; 8:00 p.m., ESPN+		at Arkansas State						First National Bank Arena; Jonesboro, AR
January 9, 2027; 3:00 p.m., ESPN+		at Louisiana–Monroe						b1Bank Fant Coliseum; Monroe, LA
January 13, 2027; 7:00 p.m., ESPN+		at Old Dominion						Chartway Arena; Norfolk
January 16, 2027; 1:00 p.m., ESPN+		Georgia State						Holmes Center; Boone, NC
January 20, 2027; 6:30 p.m., ESPN+		Coastal Carolina						Holmes Center; Boone, NC
January 23, 2027; 5:00 p.m., ESPN+		at Georgia Southern						Hill Convocation Center; Statesboro, GA
January 27, 2027; 6:30 p.m., ESPN+		Old Dominion						Holmes Center; Boone, NC
January 30, 2027; 7:00 p.m., ESPN+		at Marshall						Cam Henderson Center; Huntington, WV
February 6, 2027; 1:00 p.m., ESPN+		Southern Miss						Holmes Center; Boone, NC
February 10, 2027; 7:00 p.m., ESPN+		at James Madison						Atlantic Union Bank Center; Harrisonburg, VA
February 13, 2027; 1:00 p.m., ESPN+		Georgia Southern						Holmes Center; Boone, NC
February 18, 2027; 6:30 p.m., ESPN+		Marshall						Holmes Center; Boone, NC
February 20, 2027; 3:00 p.m., ESPN+		at Georgia State						GSU Convocation Center; Atlanta, GA
February 23, 2027; 7:00 p.m., ESPN+		at Coastal Carolina						HTC Center; Conway, SC
February 26, 2027; 6:30 p.m., ESPN+		James Madison						Holmes Center; Boone, NC
February 13, 2027; 1:00 p.m., ESPN+		Georgia Southern						Holmes Center; Boone, NC
*Non-conference game. ^{#}Rankings from AP Poll. (#) Tournament seedings in parentheses. All times are in Eastern Time.
