= List of ambassadors of the United States to Bosnia and Herzegovina =

Ambassador of the United States to Bosnia and Herzegovina
- Ambasador Sjedinjenih Država u Bosni i Hercegovini; Амбасадор Сједињених Држава у Босни и Херцеговини
- Seal of the United States Department of State

- Flag of a United States ambassador

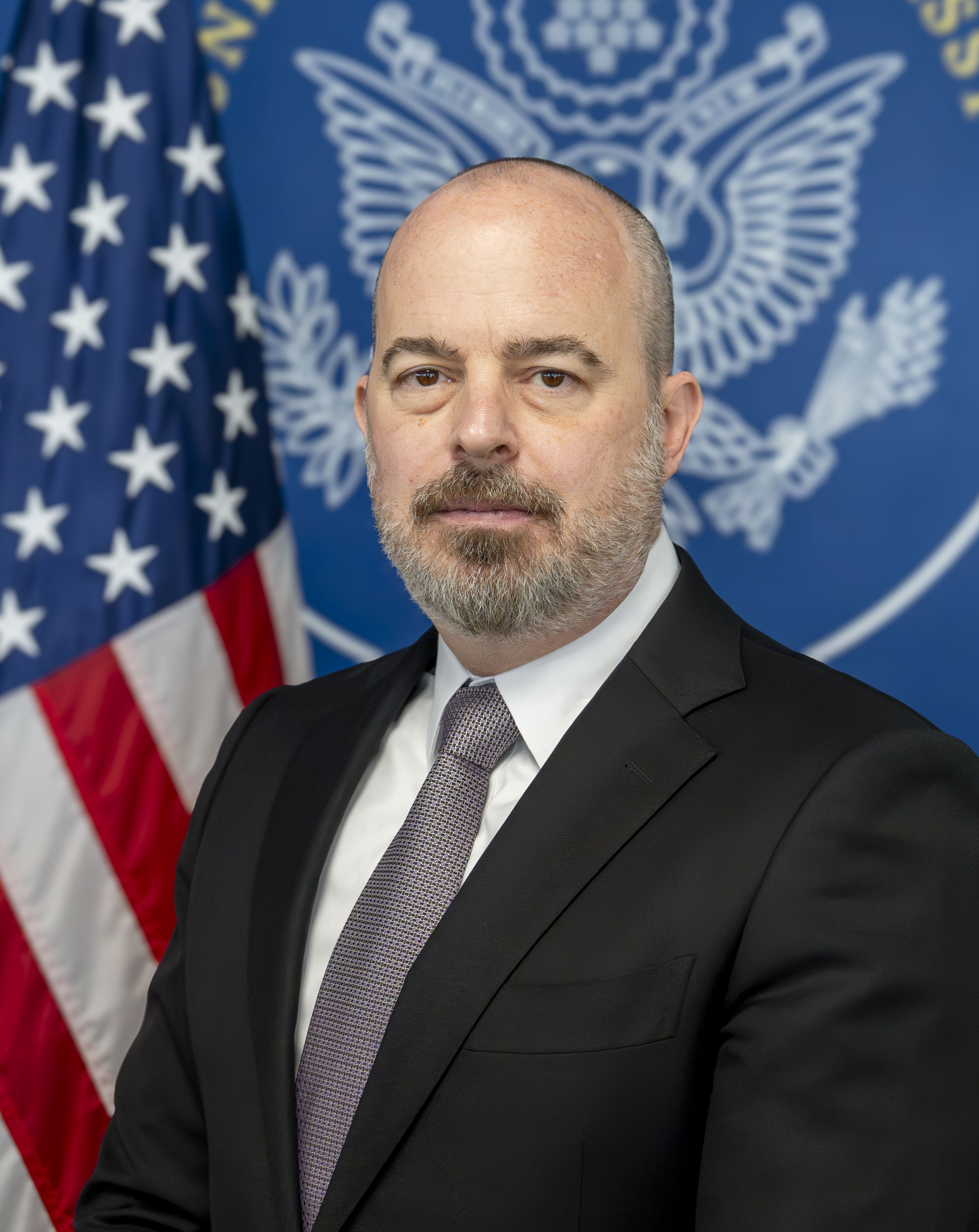
- Incumbent; John Ginkel; Chargé d'affaires since September 12, 2025
- Nominator: The president of the United States
- Appointer: The president with Senate advice and consent
- Inaugural holder: Victor Jackovich as Ambassador
- Formation: June 23, 1993
- Website: U.S. Embassy - Sarajevo

This is a list of United States ambassadors to Bosnia and Herzegovina.

The United States recognized the independence of Bosnia and Herzegovina on April 7, 1992, and announced the establishment of diplomatic relations on August 6, 1992. A U.S. Embassy was established on November 10, 1993, on the premises of the Vienna embassy. The embassy in Sarajevo was established on July 4, 1994.

== List ==
Ambassador extraordinary and plenipotentiary	Appointed	Presentation of credentials	Termination of mission	Background
Victor Jackovich	May 12, 1992	June 23, 1993	April 17, 1995	Career Foreign Service officer
John K. Menzies	October 3, 1995	January 7, 1996	December 15, 1996	Career Foreign Service officer
Richard Kauzlarich	August 1, 1997	August 28, 1997	August 20, 1999	Career Foreign Service officer
Thomas J. Miller	July 7, 1999	August 27, 1999	August 23, 2001	Career Foreign Service officer
Clifford G. Bond	October 1, 2001	November 2, 2001	August 6, 2004	Career Foreign Service officer
Douglas L. McElhaney	July 2, 2004	September 15, 2004	May 31, 2007	Career Foreign Service officer
Charles L. English	July 2, 2007	October 4, 2007	September 3, 2010	Career Foreign Service officer
Patrick S. Moon	August 8, 2010	September 14, 2010	August 24, 2013	Career Foreign Service officer
Maureen Cormack	November 24, 2014	January 16, 2015	January 16, 2019	Career Foreign Service officer
Eric G. Nelson	January 2, 2019	February 19, 2019	February 1, 2022	Career Foreign Service officer
Michael J. Murphy	December 18, 2021	February 23, 2022	February 15, 2025	Career Foreign Service officer

== See also ==
- Embassy of the United States, Sarajevo
- Bosnia and Herzegovina–United States relations
- Foreign relations of Bosnia and Herzegovina
- Ambassadors of the United States
