= 2026–27 Louisiana–Monroe Warhawks men's basketball team =

American college basketball season

2026–27 Louisiana–Monroe Warhawks men's basketball
- Conference: Sun Belt Conference
- Record: 2–6 (0–0 Sun Belt)
- Head coach: Ryan Cross (1st season)
- Assistant coaches: Jermaine Johnson; Noah Dartmann; Chris Forbes; Glen Mayo
- Home arena: b1Bank Fant Coliseum

2026–27 Sun Belt Conference men's basketball standings
	Conf.				Overall
Team	W		L	PCT	W		L	PCT
Old Dominion	0	–	0	–	5	–	1	.833
Appalachian State	0	–	0	–	3	–	1	.750
Louisiana Tech	0	–	0	–	3	–	2	.600
South Alabama	0	–	0	–	3	–	3	.500
Arkansas State	0	–	0	–	2	–	2	.500
James Madison	0	–	0	–	2	–	2	.500
Coastal Carolina	0	–	0	–	2	–	3	.400
Georgia State	0	–	0	–	2	–	3	.400
Marshall	0	–	0	–	2	–	3	.400
Southern Miss	0	–	0	–	2	–	3	.400
Troy	0	–	0	–	2	–	3	.400
Louisiana	0	–	0	–	1	–	2	.333
Louisiana–Monroe	0	–	0	–	2	–	5	.286
Georgia Southern	0	–	0	–	1	–	4	.200
† 2027 Sun Belt tournament winner As of November 19, 2026; Rankings from AP poll

The 2026–27 Louisiana–Monroe Warhawks men's basketball team represents the University of Louisiana at Monroe in the 2026–27 NCAA Division I men's basketball season. Led by first-year head coach Ryan Cross, the Warhawks play their home games at b1Bank Fant Coliseum in Monroe, Louisiana, as members of the Sun Belt Conference.

== Previous season ==
The Warhawks finished the 2025–26 season 4–28 overall and 1–17 in Sun Belt play. As the No. 14 seed in the Sun Belt tournament, they lost 87–80 to No. 11 seed Old Dominion in the first round.

== Offseason ==
=== Coaching changes ===
On March 9, 2026, ULM fired head coach Phil Cunningham after one season. Associate head coach Derrick Zimmerman was named interim head coach while the school ran a national search. Cunningham later joined the staff at Kansas State as an assistant coach.

On March 25, 2026, athletic director SJ Tuohy named UAB associate head coach Ryan Cross the ninth head coach in program history. Cross had been on ULM's staff from 2012 to 2020 under Keith Richard, first as an assistant and then as associate head coach from 2018. He then spent six seasons at UAB under Andy Kennedy, serving as associate head coach for the last three. According to the Shreveport-Bossier Journal, LSU Shreveport head coach Kyle Blankenship was the other finalist for the job. On April 14, Cross hired Jermaine Johnson, Noah Dartmann, Chris Forbes and Glen Mayo as assistant coaches. Johnson came from Memphis and Dartmann from UAB. The Sun Belt welcomed Cross in June, as one of three new head coaches in the league for 2026–27.

=== Roster turnover ===
Cross's first recruiting class had 14 players: one high school signee, six transfers from four-year schools and seven junior college players. Guard Cam Campbell was the only player from the 2025–26 roster who returned.

=== Departures ===
Name	Number	Pos.	Height	Weight	Year	Hometown	Reason for departure
Dylan Diaz	0	G	6'2"	170	Junior	Clermont, Florida	Left the program
Przemek Hartman	1	F	6'9"	216	Freshman	Gdańsk, Poland	Transferred to Le Moyne
Micah Caster	2	G	6'2"	180	Sophomore	McIntosh, Alabama	Transferred to Truman State
Krystian Lewis	3	G	6'3"	185	Sophomore	Monroe, Louisiana	Transferred to Tulane
Lavell Brodnex	4	G/F	6'5"	190	Senior	Saginaw, Michigan	Left the program
Renars Sondors	5	F	6'9"	215	Sophomore	Riga, Latvia	Transferred to Wyoming
Ajay Tew	6	G	5'11"	175	Junior	Jonesboro, Louisiana	Left the program
Alex Molofeev	8	G	6'5"	205	Freshman	Moscow, Russia	Left the program
Brentay Noel	9	F/C	6'10"	220	Junior	Baton Rouge, Louisiana	Left the program
Wiggy Ball	11	G	6'3"	180	Freshman	Flowood, Mississippi	Left the program
Alex Huguet Carrasco	12	G/F	6'7"	185	Freshman	Palma de Mallorca, Spain	Transferred to Loyola (MD)
MJ Russell	21	G	6'3"	195	Redshirt Junior	Coker, Alabama	Transferred to Stephen F. Austin
Ayomide Bamisile	23	F	6'7"	205	Redshirt Sophomore	Lagos, Nigeria	Transferred to Little Rock

=== Incoming transfers ===
Name	Number	Pos.	Height	Weight	Year	Hometown	Previous school
Quaran McPherson	0	G	6'4"	200	Senior	Queens, New York	UAB
Dayjaun Anderson	1	G	6'2"	185	Senior	Dayton, Ohio	UAB
Phillip Tillman	2	G	6'0"	185	Junior	Turrell, Arkansas	ASU Mid-South
Khalil London	3	G	6'3"	185	Junior	Wyandanch, New York	Tennessee State
Mike White	4	G	6'3"	210	Junior	Buford, Georgia	Lincoln Trail
Lance Carr	5	F	6'7"	205	Sophomore	Dallas, Texas	UAB
Robert Cowherd	6	G	6'5"	210	Junior	Grayson, Georgia	Southern Miss
Grant Chamberlain	8	F	6'6"	205	Senior	Orlando, Florida	Parkland College
Jakeel Registe	9	F	6'5"	200	Junior	Houston, Texas	Odessa
Martins Adonry	10	C	6'8"	245	Junior	Manchester, England	Lamar State
Ziyade Ndancky	11	C	6'10"	250	Junior	Bronx, New York	Odessa
Guillaume Schoentgen	20	F	6'9"	225	Sophomore	Waterloo, Belgium	South Georgia Tech
Jean Lafleur	34	C	6'10"	265	Senior	Memphis, Tennessee	Tennessee State

McPherson, Anderson and Carr followed Cross from UAB. Cowherd, a former four-star recruit, had also played at Ole Miss before Southern Miss, and London had played at Charleston before Tennessee State. Among the junior college players, Tillman and White were junior college All-Americans. Chamberlain, an NJCAA All-American, made 92 three-pointers at a 47 percent rate as Parkland won the NJCAA Division II national championship. Adonry led NJCAA Region 14 in rebounding, and Schoentgen has played for the Belgian national team.

=== 2026 recruiting class ===
Name	Number	Pos.	Height	Weight	Hometown	High school
Cooper Nelson	7	G	5'9"	160	Monroe, Louisiana	Sterlington High School

Nelson was the Louisiana Class 3A Player of the Year.

== Preseason ==
On October 18, 2026, the Sun Belt released its preseason coaches' poll. Louisiana–Monroe was picked to finish last of the 14 teams. No ULM players were named to the three preseason All-Sun Belt teams, and Southern Miss guard Isaac Taveras was named Preseason Player of the Year.

=== Sun Belt preseason poll ===
Sun Belt Preseason Poll
Place	Team	Points
1	Arkansas State	182 (3)
2	James Madison	176 (9)
3	Troy	143
4	South Alabama	136
5	Marshall	125
6	Louisiana	117
7	Southern Miss	109 (2)
8	Appalachian State	105
9	Georgia Southern	85
10	Georgia State	79
11	Old Dominion	76
12	Louisiana Tech	64
13	Coastal Carolina	58
14	Louisiana–Monroe	15
(#) first-place votes

== Roster ==
2026–27 Louisiana–Monroe Warhawks men's basketball team
Players
Coaches

Pos.	#	Name	Height	Weight	Year	Previous school	Hometown
G	0	Quaran McPherson	6 ft 4 in (1.93 m)	200 lb (91 kg)	Sr	UAB	Queens, New York
G	1	Dayjaun Anderson	6 ft 2 in (1.88 m)	185 lb (84 kg)	Sr	UAB	Dayton, Ohio
G	2	Phillip Tillman	6 ft 0 in (1.83 m)	185 lb (84 kg)	Jr	ASU Mid-South	Turrell, Arkansas
G	3	Khalil London	6 ft 3 in (1.91 m)	185 lb (84 kg)	Jr	Tennessee State	Wyandanch, New York
G	4	Mike White	6 ft 3 in (1.91 m)	210 lb (95 kg)	Jr	Lincoln Trail	Buford, Georgia
F	5	Lance Carr	6 ft 7 in (2.01 m)	205 lb (93 kg)	So	UAB	Dallas, Texas
G	6	Robert Cowherd	6 ft 5 in (1.96 m)	210 lb (95 kg)	Jr	Southern Miss	Grayson, Georgia
G	7	Cooper Nelson	5 ft 9 in (1.75 m)	160 lb (73 kg)	Fr	Sterlington High School	Monroe, Louisiana
F	8	Grant Chamberlain	6 ft 6 in (1.98 m)	205 lb (93 kg)	Sr	Parkland College	Orlando, Florida
F	9	Jakeel Registe	6 ft 5 in (1.96 m)	200 lb (91 kg)	Jr	Odessa	Houston, Texas
C	10	Martins Adonry	6 ft 8 in (2.03 m)	245 lb (111 kg)	Jr	Lamar State	Manchester, England
C	11	Ziyade Ndancky	6 ft 10 in (2.08 m)	250 lb (113 kg)	Jr	Odessa	Bronx, New York
G	13	Cam Campbell	6 ft 3 in (1.91 m)	195 lb (88 kg)	Jr	Asbury	Brownsville, Kentucky
F	20	Guillaume Schoentgen	6 ft 9 in (2.06 m)	225 lb (102 kg)	So	South Georgia Tech	Waterloo, Belgium
C	34	Jean Lafleur	6 ft 10 in (2.08 m)	265 lb (120 kg)	Sr	Tennessee State	Memphis, Tennessee

Head coach

- Ryan Cross (Buffalo)

Assistant coach(es)

- Jermaine Johnson
- Noah Dartmann
- Chris Forbes
- Glen Mayo

Legend

- (C) Team captain
- (S) Suspended
- (I) Ineligible
- (W) Walk-on
- Injured
- Current redshirt

Roster
Last update: November 13, 2026

== Schedule and results ==
Date time, TV	Rank^{#}	Opponent^{#}	Result	Record	High points	High rebounds	High assists	Site (attendance) city, state
Exhibition
October 28, 2026*; 6:30 p.m.		Centenary	W 96–61	–	–	–	–	b1Bank Fant Coliseum; Monroe, LA
Regular season
November 2, 2026*; 6:30 p.m., ESPN+		Central Michigan; MAC–SBC Challenge	L 78–83	0–1	24 – McPherson	10 – Carr	3 – Tied	b1Bank Fant Coliseum (1,310); Monroe, LA
November 4, 2026*; 6:30 p.m., ESPN+		Champion Christian	W 99–55	1–1	24 – Anderson	8 – White	5 – White	b1Bank Fant Coliseum (1,260); Monroe, LA
November 9, 2026*; 7:00 p.m., SECN+		at Texas A&M	L 67–108	1–2	16 – McPherson	8 – Anderson	4 – White	Reed Arena (6,283); College Station, TX
November 10, 2026*; 8:00 p.m., ESPN+		at TCU	L 92–100 ^{2OT}	1–3	20 – Anderson	14 – Carr	5 – Anderson	Schollmaier Arena (4,521); Fort Worth, TX
November 13, 2026*; 8:00 p.m., ESPN+		at Arizona State	L 62–92	1–4	17 – Anderson	8 – Anderson	1 – Tied	Desert Financial Arena (5,351); Tempe, AZ
November 14, 2026*; 7:00 p.m., MW+		at Grand Canyon	L 52–88	1–5	18 – Anderson	7 – Carr	2 – Anderson	Global Credit Union Arena; Phoenix, AZ
November 16, 2026*; 7:30 p.m., ESPN+		Dallas Christian	W 118–81	2–5	24 – Anderson	8 – Lafleur	5 – London	b1Bank Fant Coliseum (1,270); Monroe, LA
November 18, 2026*; 7:00 p.m., SECN+		at No. 25 LSU	L 67–79	2–6	21 – Tillman	8 – Lafleur	4 – Tillman	Pete Maravich Assembly Center (7,591); Baton Rouge, LA
November 24, 2026*; 6:30 p.m., ESPN+		Houston Christian						b1Bank Fant Coliseum; Monroe, LA
November 29, 2026*; 1:00 p.m., ESPN2		at Tulane						Devlin Fieldhouse; New Orleans, LA
December 2, 2026*; 6:00 p.m., ESPN+		at Lamar						Montagne Center; Beaumont, TX
December 5, 2026; 1:00 p.m., ESPN+		Georgia State						b1Bank Fant Coliseum; Monroe, LA
December 12, 2026*; 1:00 p.m., SECN+		vs. Ole Miss						Landers Center; Southaven, MS
December 16, 2026; 7:00 p.m., ESPN+		at Louisiana						Cajundome; Lafayette, LA
December 28, 2026*; 7:00 p.m., SECN+		at Oklahoma						Lloyd Noble Center; Norman, OK
December 31, 2026; 1:00 p.m., ESPN+		at Old Dominion						Chartway Arena; Norfolk, VA
January 2, 2027; 12:00 p.m.		at Coastal Carolina						HTC Center; Conway, SC
January 7, 2027; 6:30 p.m.		Marshall						b1Bank Fant Coliseum; Monroe, LA
January 9, 2027; 2:00 p.m.		Appalachian State						b1Bank Fant Coliseum; Monroe, LA
January 14, 2027; 6:30 p.m.		South Alabama						b1Bank Fant Coliseum; Monroe, LA
January 16, 2027; 3:30 p.m.		at Troy						Trojan Arena; Troy, AL
January 20, 2027; 7:00 p.m.		at Southern Miss						Reed Green Coliseum; Hattiesburg, MS
January 23, 2027; 2:30 p.m.		Louisiana Tech						b1Bank Fant Coliseum; Monroe, LA
January 30, 2027; 4:00 p.m.		at James Madison						Atlantic Union Bank Center; Harrisonburg, VA
February 3, 2027; 6:30 p.m.		Troy						b1Bank Fant Coliseum; Monroe, LA
February 6, 2027*; TBA		at TBA; MAC–SBC Challenge						TBA
February 10, 2027; 7:00 p.m.		at Arkansas State						First National Bank Arena; Jonesboro, AR
February 13, 2027; 3:00 p.m.		at Louisiana Tech						Thomas Assembly Center; Ruston, LA
February 17, 2027; 6:30 p.m.		Southern Miss						b1Bank Fant Coliseum; Monroe, LA
February 20, 2027; 2:30 p.m.		Arkansas State						b1Bank Fant Coliseum; Monroe, LA
February 24, 2027; 7:00 p.m.		at South Alabama						Mitchell Center; Mobile, AL
February 26, 2027; 6:30 p.m.		Louisiana						b1Bank Fant Coliseum; Monroe, LA
Sun Belt tournament
March 2–8, 2027; TBA		vs. TBD						Pensacola Bay Center; Pensacola, FL
*Non-conference game. ^{#}Rankings from AP poll. (#) Tournament seedings in parentheses. All times are in Central.
