= John Aiken (basketball) =

American basketball coach (born 1982)

Current position
- Title: Assistant coach
- Team: South Alabama
- Conference: Sun Belt Conference

Biographical details
- Born: April 30, 1982 (age 44); Portland, Maine, U.S.
- Education: Southern Maine

Coaching career (HC unless noted)
- 2007–2008: UNE (assistant)
- 2008–2012: Belhaven (assistant)
- 2012–2014: Belhaven
- 2014–2016: UT Martin (assistant)
- 2016–2018: Nicholls State (assistant)
- 2018–2021: McNeese (assistant)
- 2021–2023: McNeese
- 2024–2026: UT Martin (assistant)
- 2026–present: South Alabama (assistant)

Head coaching record
- Overall: 52–78 (.400)

John Aiken (born April 30, 1982) is an American basketball coach who currently serves as an assistant coach for the South Alabama. He previously served as the head men's basketball coach at McNeese State and as an assistant coach for the UT Martin Skyhawks.

== Coaching career ==
Aiken began his coaching career in his native Maine assisting at Greater Portland Christian School and Cheverus High School, the latter under former Boston University men's basketball coach Bob Brown, the father of Brett Brown. He'd get his start in the collegiate ranks as an assistant coach at the University of New England before becoming an assistant coach at Belhaven. After serving in the assistant role for four seasons, Aiken was elevated to head coach where he guided the Blazers to a 30–33 record in two seasons.

Moving into the Division I ranks, Aiken joined Heath Schroyer's staff at UT Martin, and followed it up with an assistant coaching stint at Nicholls State. He'd reunite with Schroyer at McNeese State as an assistant coach, and on March 11, 2021, Aiken would be elevated to head coach after Schroyer took on the position of athletic director full time. He was fired on March 8, 2023.

== Head coaching record ==
=== NAIA ===
Record table
Season	Team	Overall	Conference	Standing	Postseason
Belhaven Blazers (SSAC) (2012–2014)
2012–13	Belhaven	12–18	8–10	6th (West)	
2013–14	Belhaven	18–15	14–6	2nd (West)	
Belhaven:		30–33 (.476)	22–16 (.579)		
Total:		30–33 (.476)			
National champion Postseason invitational champion Conference regular season champion Conference regular season and conference tournament champion Division regular season champion Division regular season and conference tournament champion Conference tournament champion

=== NCAA DI ===
Record table
Season	Team	Overall	Conference	Standing	Postseason
McNeese State Cowboys (Southland Conference) (2021–2023)
2021–22	McNeese State	11–22	4–10	7th	
2022–23	McNeese State	11–23	6–12	8th	
McNeese State:		22–45 (.318)	10–22 (.313)		
Total:		22–45 (.318)			
National champion Postseason invitational champion Conference regular season champion Conference regular season and conference tournament champion Division regular season champion Division regular season and conference tournament champion Conference tournament champion
