= Richie Riley =

American basketball coach (born 1983)

Current position
- Title: Head coach
- Team: South Alabama
- Conference: Sun Belt
- Record: 152–106 (.589)

Biographical details
- Born: January 8, 1983 (age 43); London, Kentucky, U.S.

Playing career
- 2001–2002: Eastern Kentucky

Coaching career (HC unless noted)
- 2003–2005: Georgetown (KY) (assistant)
- 2005–2006: Hawaii Pacific (assistant)
- 2006–2009: Pikeville (assistant)
- 2009–2011: Coastal Carolina (assistant)
- 2011–2012: Eastern Kentucky (assistant)
- 2012–2014: UAB (assistant)
- 2014–2016: Clemson (assistant)
- 2016–2018: Nicholls State
- 2018–present: South Alabama

Head coaching record
- Overall: 187–134 (.583)
- Tournaments: 2–1 (TBC); 0–1 (NIT

Accomplishments and honors

Championships
- Southland regular season (2018); Sun Belt regular season (2025)

Awards
- Southland Coach of the Year (2018); Sun Belt Coach of the Year (2025)

Richard Allen Riley II (born January 8, 1983) is an American college basketball coach and current head coach at the University of South Alabama.

== Playing career ==
Riley played one collegiate season at Eastern Kentucky under coach Travis Ford. He graduated in 2005 from EKU.

== Coaching career ==
As a head coach in Division 1 Men's Basketball, Richie Riley was ranked 16th on ESPN.com's “40 Under 40” list in 2020, and a finalist for the Ben Jobe Award, presented annually to the top NCAA Division I minority coach by CollegeInsider.com.

Riley joined Cliff Ellis's staff at Coastal Carolina for his first Division one assistant coaching job, spending three seasons there before a one-year stop as an assistant coach at his alma mater, Eastern Kentucky. He then held assistant positions at UAB and Clemson before accepting the head coaching position at Nicholls State, becoming the 11th coach in program history, replacing J. P. Piper.

After two seasons with Nicholls State, Riley was named the 10th head coach in program history at South Alabama, replacing Matthew Graves.

== Head coaching record ==
=== NCAA DI ===
Record table
Season	Team	Overall	Conference	Standing	Postseason
Nicholls State Colonels (Southland Conference) (2016–2018)
2016–17	Nicholls State	14–17	7–11	T–8th	
2017–18	Nicholls State	21–11	15–3	T–1st	
Nicholls State:		35–28 (.556)	22–14 (.611)		
South Alabama Jaguars (Sun Belt Conference) (2018–present)
2018–19	South Alabama	17–17	8–10	8th	
2019–20	South Alabama	20–11	13–7	T–2nd	
2020–21	South Alabama	17–11	10–7	3rd (East)	
2021–22	South Alabama	21–12	9–7	5th	TBC Semifinals
2022–23	South Alabama	19–16	9–9	T–7th	
2023–24	South Alabama	16–16	8–10	T–7th	
2024–25	South Alabama	21–11	13–5	T–1st	
2025–26	South Alabama	21–12	11–7	T–2nd	NIT First Round
2026–27	South Alabama	0–0	0–0		
South Alabama:		152–106 (.589)	81–62 (.566)		
Total:		187–134 (.583)			
National champion Postseason invitational champion Conference regular season champion Conference regular season and conference tournament champion Division regular season champion Division regular season and conference tournament champion Conference tournament champion
