= Douglas L. McElhaney =

American diplomat

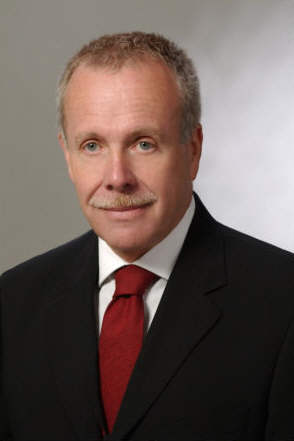
Douglas L. McElhaney

Douglas L. McElhaney (born 1947) is an American diplomat. He served as the Ambassador to Bosnia and Herzegovina 2004–2007.

McElhaney, a career officer of the United States Foreign Service, was sworn in as Ambassador to Bosnia and Herzegovina on August 6, 2004 at the State Department and arrived in Sarajevo on September 14.

Ambassador McElhaney joined the State Department in 1973 and was immediately assigned as Vice Consul to the American Embassy in Lisbon, Portugal. After working in the State Department Operations Center in 1975, he did further graduate work at Stanford University from 1977–78. During the next four years he worked on the Namibia negotiations that helped bring the southwest African nation to independence, followed by a tour in the U.S. Embassy in Brussels, Belgium.

As the Deputy Political Counselor at the U.S. Embassy in Cairo, Egypt, 1987–89, he worked on the Mideast peace negotiations. After an assignment in the U.S. Embassy in Rome, Italy, he returned to Washington to work on European military issues. From 1995–2000, he served as Political Counselor and then as U.S. Deputy Permanent Representative at the U.S. Mission to NATO. He was Deputy Chief of Mission at the U.S. Embassy in Paris, often serving as Chargé d'Affaires, before his most recent assignment as U.S. Consul General in Milan, Italy.

A 31-year veteran of the State Department, Ambassador McElhaney is a member of the American Foreign Service Association and has received numerous meritorious and superior honor awards during his career. He graduated with honors with a B.A. from the University of Michigan and an M.A. from Columbia University in international affairs.

== Sources ==
- U.S. Embassy Sarajevo: Ambassador’s biography

Diplomatic posts
Preceded by Clifford G. Bond	United States Ambassador to Bosnia and Herzegovina; 2004–2007	Succeeded by Charles L. English
