= 2026–27 Coastal Carolina Chanticleers men's basketball team =

American college basketball season

2026–27 Coastal Carolina Chanticleers men's basketball
- Conference: Sun Belt Conference
- Record: 2–4 (0–0 Sun Belt)
- Head coach: Justin Gray (3rd season)
- Associate head coach: Tim Koenig (1st season)
- Assistant coaches: Jason Allison; Kylen Butler; Brian Graves
- Home arena: HTC Center

2026–27 Sun Belt Conference men's basketball standings
	Conf.				Overall
Team	W		L	PCT	W		L	PCT
Old Dominion	0	–	0	–	5	–	1	.833
Appalachian State	0	–	0	–	4	–	1	.800
Louisiana Tech	0	–	0	–	4	–	2	.667
Arkansas State	0	–	0	–	3	–	2	.600
James Madison	0	–	0	–	3	–	2	.600
Southern Miss	0	–	0	–	3	–	3	.500
South Alabama	0	–	0	–	3	–	4	.429
Troy	0	–	0	–	2	–	3	.400
Coastal Carolina	0	–	0	–	2	–	4	.333
Georgia Southern	0	–	0	–	2	–	4	.333
Georgia State	0	–	0	–	2	–	4	.333
Marshall	0	–	0	–	2	–	4	.333
Louisiana–Monroe	0	–	0	–	2	–	6	.250
Louisiana	0	–	0	–	1	–	3	.250
† 2027 Sun Belt tournament winner As of November 21, 2026; Rankings from AP poll

The 2026–27 Coastal Carolina Chanticleers men's basketball team represented Coastal Carolina University in the 2026–27 NCAA Division I men's basketball season. The Chanticleers, led by 3rd-year head coach Justin Gray, played their home games at the HTC Center in Conway, South Carolina as members of the Sun Belt Conference.

== Previous season ==
The Chanticleers finished the 2025–26 season 19–13, 11–7 in Sun Belt play, to finish in thirteenth place. They lost to Georgia Southern in the quarterfinals of the Sun Belt Conference tournament.

== Preseason ==
=== Preseason Sun Belt Conference poll ===
The Chanticleers were picked to finish in thirteenth place in the conference's preseason poll.

Coaches poll
Predicted finish	Team (1st place Votes)
1	Arkansas State - 182 (3)
2	James Madison - 176 (9)
3	Troy - 143
4	South Alabama- 136
5	Marshall - 125
6	Louisiana- 117
7	Southern Miss - 109 (2)
8	App State - 105
9	Georgia Southern- 85
10	Georgia State- 79
11	Old Dominion - 76
12	Louisiana Tech - 64
13	Coastal Carolina - 58
14	ULM - 15

== Roster ==
2026–27 Coastal Carolina Chanticleers men's basketball team
Players
Coaches

Pos.	#	Name	Height	Weight	Year	Previous school	Hometown
G	0	Trey Perry	6 ft 1 in (1.85 m)	185 lb (84 kg)	So	Miami (OH)	Liberty Township, OH
G	1	Tristan Thompson	6 ft 5 in (1.96 m)	215 lb (98 kg)	So	Wilson	Florence, SC
G/F	2	Jaevian Alston	6 ft 6 in (1.98 m)	205 lb (93 kg)	So	Mount Olive	Louisburg, NC
G	3	DaJohn Craig	6 ft 1 in (1.85 m)	165 lb (75 kg)	Jr	Oregon State	Indianapolis, IN
G	4	Q Williams IV	5 ft 9 in (1.75 m)	180 lb (82 kg)	Fr	Forsyth Country Day School	Winston-Salem, NC
G	5	Darius Washington III	6 ft 5 in (1.96 m)	215 lb (98 kg)	So	Kennesaw State	Orlando, FL
F	6	Drew Fuquay	6 ft 8 in (2.03 m)	220 lb (100 kg)	Sr	Marshall	Detroit, MI
F	7	Ashton Hardaway	6 ft 8 in (2.03 m)	240 lb (109 kg)	Sr	Memphis	Carson, CA
G	9	Jaylen Cross	6 ft 4 in (1.93 m)	190 lb (86 kg)	So	Wake Forest	Greensboro, NC
C	10	Caleb Middleton	6 ft 11 in (2.11 m)	230 lb (104 kg)	Jr	Elon	Dover, NH
F	11	Jordan Buzzard	6 ft 9 in (2.06 m)	215 lb (98 kg)	Fr	East Mecklenburg	Charlotte, NC
G	12	Bryson Sams	6 ft 3 in (1.91 m)	215 lb (98 kg)	Fr	Socastee	Myrtle Beach, SC
F	15	Derrick Green	6 ft 9 in (2.06 m)	275 lb (125 kg)	Jr	Brunswick Community College	Fayetteville, NC
F	20	Fletcher Bigham	6 ft 8 in (2.03 m)	225 lb (102 kg)	Sr	Sewanee	Charlotte, NC
G	30	JT Kelsheimer	5 ft 10 in (1.78 m)	170 lb (77 kg)	Fr	Saint Edward	Cleveland, OH

Head coach

- Justin Gray (Wake Forest)

Assistant coach(es)

- Tim Koenig (Case Western Reserve)
- Jason Allison (Liberty)
- Kylen Butler (Indianapolis)
- Brian Graves (Catawba)

Legend

- (C) Team captain
- (S) Suspended
- (I) Ineligible
- (W) Walk-on
- Injured
- Current redshirt

Roster
Last update: October 14, 2025

== Schedule and results ==
Date time, TV	Rank^{#}	Opponent^{#}	Result	Record	High points	High rebounds	High assists	Site (attendance) city, state
Exhibition
October 28, 2026*; 7:00 p.m.		Columbia International	W 76–72		27 – Perry	10 – Tied	1 – Tied	HTC Center (837); Conway, SC
Regular season
November 2, 2026*; 7:00 p.m., ESPN+		Eastern Michigan; MAC–SBC Challenge	L 70–71	0–1	20 – Perry	8 – Cross	3 – Perry	HTC Center (1,886); Conway, SC
November 5, 2026*; 8:00 p.m., ACC Network		at No. 2 Duke	L 52–113	0–2	14 – Perry	4 – Tied	2 – Washington III	Cameron Indoor Stadium (9,314); Durham, NC
November 9, 2026*; 7:00 p.m., ESPN+		USC Upstate	W 65–56	1–2	18 – Perry	7 – Tied	5 – Cross	HTC Center (1,724); Conway, SC
November 12, 2026*; 7:00 p.m., ESPN+		Virginia–Lynchburg	W 103–54	2–2	16 – Cross	11 – Middleton	7 – Perry	HTC Center (2,076); Conway, SC
November 15, 2026*; 8:00 p.m., B1G Network		at Wisconsin	L 81–89	2–3	21 – Perry	10 – Washington III	4 – Washington III	Kohl Center (13,794); Madison, WI
November 20, 2026*; 7:00 p.m., SEC Network+		at No. 14 Tennessee	L 51–78	2–4	12 – Perry	7 – Thompson	2 – Tied	Thompson–Boling Arena (17,663); Knoxville, TN
November 24, 2026*; 7:00 p.m., ESPN+		Campbell						HTC Center; Conway, SC
November 28, 2026*; 3:00 p.m., ESPN+		Western Illinois						HTC Center; Conway, SC
December 2, 2026*; 7:00 p.m., ESPN+		at Queens						Curry Arena; Charlotte, NC
December 5, 2026*; 3:00 p.m., ESPN+		Winthrop						HTC Center; Conway, SC
December 9, 2026*; 7:00 p.m., ESPN+		at East Carolina						Williams Arena at Minges Coliseum; Greenville, NC
December 13, 2026*; 3:00 p.m., ESPN+		Carolina University						HTC Center; Conway, SC
December 16, 2026; 7:00 p.m., ESPN+		at Georgia Southern						Hill Convocation Center; Statesboro, GA
December 19, 2026; 4:30 p.m., ESPN+		at Troy						Trojan Arena; Troy, AL
December 22, 2026*; 12:00 p.m., FloSports		at William & Mary						Kaplan Arena; Williamsburg, VA
December 31, 2026; 3:00 p.m., ESPN+		Louisiana Tech						HTC Center; Conway, SC
January 2, 2027; 1:00 p.m., ESPN+		Louisiana-Monroe						HTC Center; Conway, SC
January 7, 2027; 8:00 p.m., ESPN+		at Southern Miss						Reed Green Coliseum; Hattiesburg, MS
January 9, 2027; 4:00 p.m., ESPN+		at South Alabama						Mitchell Center; Mobile, AL
January 15, 2027; 7:00 p.m., ESPN+		Louisiana						HTC Center; Conway, SC
January 20, 2027; 6:30 p.m., ESPN+		at Appalachian State						Holmes Center; Boone, NC
January 23, 2027; 3:00 p.m., ESPN+		Marshall						HTC Center; Conway, SC
January 27, 2027; 7:00 p.m., ESPN+		Georgia Southern						HTC Center; Conway, SC
January 30, 2027; 8:00 p.m., ESPN+		at Georgia State						Georgia State Convocation Center; Atlanta, GA
February 3, 2027; 7:00 p.m., ESPN+		James Madison						HTC Center; Conway, SC
February 6, 2027*; TBA, TBA		TBA; MAC–SBC Challenge						TBA; TBA
February 11, 2027; 7:00 p.m., ESPN+		at Marshall						Cam Henderson Center; Huntington, WV
February 13, 2027; 3:00 p.m., ESPN+		Old Domion						HTC Center; Conway, SC
February 20, 2027; 5:00 p.m., ESPN+		at James Madison						Atlantic Union Bank Center; Harrisonburg, VA
February 23, 2027; 7:00 p.m., ESPN+		Appalachian State						HTC Center; Conway, SC
February 26, 2027; 7:00 p.m., ESPN+		at Old Domion						Chartway Arena; Norfolk, VA
Sun Belt Tournament
March 2–9, 2027		vs. TBA						Pensacola Bay Center; Pensacola, FL
*Non-conference game. ^{#}Rankings from AP Poll. (#) Tournament seedings in parentheses. All times are in Eastern Time.
