= Michael J. Murphy (diplomat) =

American diplomat

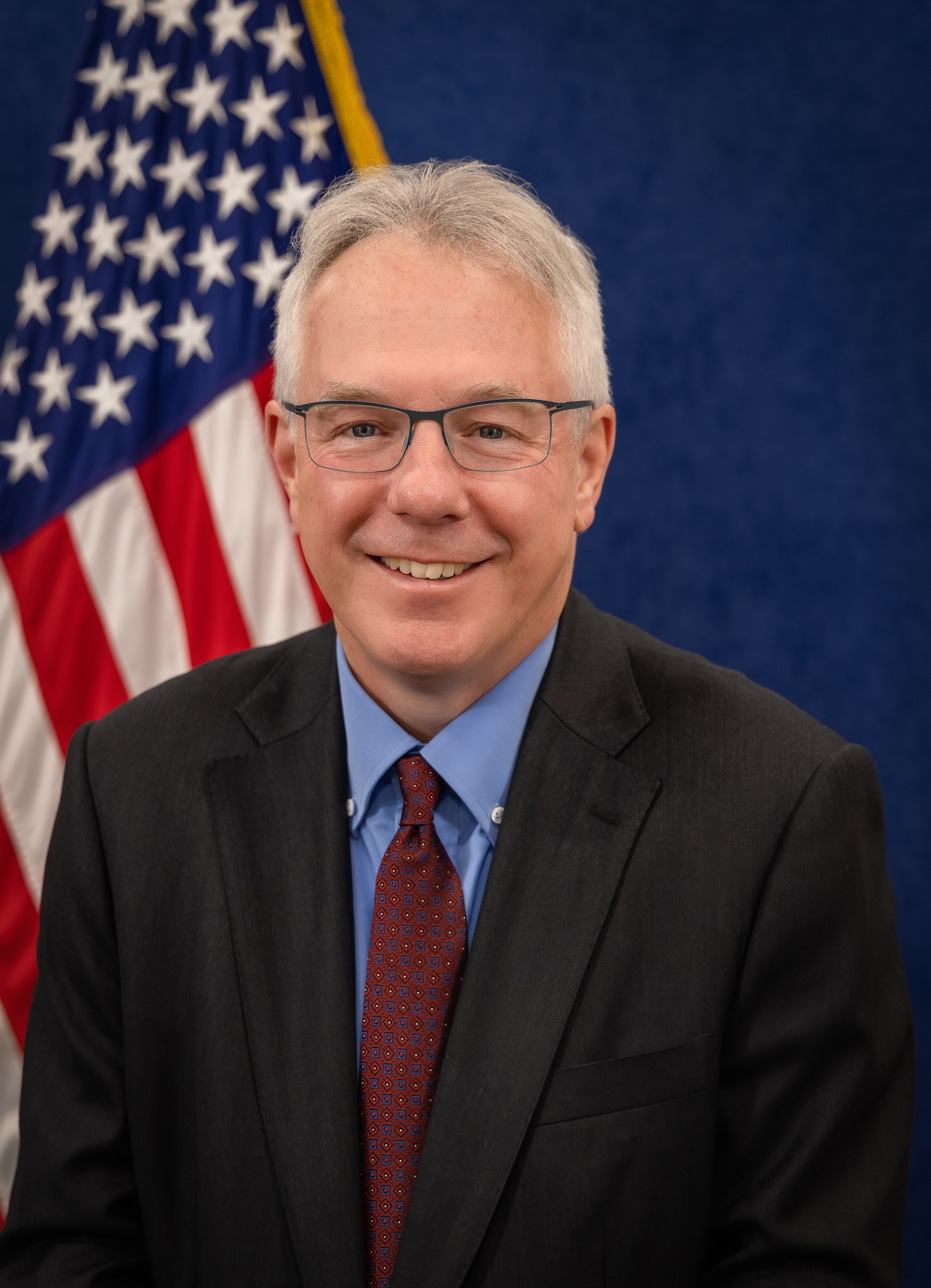

United States Ambassador to Bosnia and Herzegovina
- In office February 23, 2022 – February 15, 2025
- President: Joe Biden; Donald Trump
- Preceded by: Eric Nelson

Deputy Assistant Secretary of State for European and Eurasian Affairs
- In office June 18, 2018 – September 24, 2021
- President: Donald Trump; Joe Biden

Principal Deputy Assistant Secretary of State for European and Eurasian Affairs
- Acting
- In office February 18, 2019 – September 1, 2019

Personal details
- Born: Rochester, New York, U.S.
- Education: Hamilton College (BA)

Michael John Murphy is an American diplomat who served as the United States ambassador to Bosnia and Herzegovina from 2022 to 2025.

== Early life and education ==
Michael John Murphy was born in Rochester, New York to John Murphy and Barbara (Schafer) Murphy. He is the eldest of three sons. The family lived in Chili, New York until 1973 when they moved to East Greenbush, New York. Murphy attended Columbia High School, graduating in 1983. Murphy earned a Bachelor of Arts from Hamilton College in 1987 where he was also involved with Phi Beta Kappa. Murphy and his wife, Kimberly Haroz, met in their diplomatic training class in 1991, and the two married in Lagos, Nigeria in 1992. They have no children.

== Career ==
Murphy is a career member of the Senior Foreign Service with the rank of Minister-Counselor where he has served for 30 years. From 2017 to 2018, served as director of the office for European security & political-military affairs in the Bureau of European and Eurasian Affairs. From 2015 to 2017, he served as the associate dean of the leadership and management school at the National Foreign Affairs Training Center. From 2012 to 2015, Murphy was the deputy chief of mission at the U.S. Embassy in Gaborone, Botswana and also as Chargé d’Affaires, a.i., in Botswana from February 2014 to January 2015. From 2009 to 2012, he was deputy chief of mission at the U.S. Embassy in Pristina, Kosovo and served for three years as political counselor at the U.S. Embassy in Sarajevo, Bosnia and Herzegovina. Other overseas postings include London; Yaoundé, Cameroon; and Lagos, Nigeria. In Washington, D.C., he served as chief of staff to both the Assistant Secretary of State for European and Eurasian Affairs and the Director General of the Foreign Service. He also served as desk officer for Bulgaria and for the North Atlantic Treaty Organization. From June 18, 2018, until September 24, 2021, he had served as the Deputy Assistant Secretary of State in the Bureau of European and Eurasian Affairs.

=== United States ambassador to Bosnia and Herzegovina ===
On July 16, 2021, President Joe Biden nominated Murphy to be the next United States ambassador to Bosnia and Herzegovina. On October 5, 2021, a hearing on his nomination was held before the Senate Foreign Relations Committee. On October 19, 2021, his nomination was reported favorably out of committee. The United States Senate confirmed him on December 18, 2021 by voice vote. He presented his credentials on February 23, 2022. In April 2022, he supported UDIK's idea about monument at Kazani.

==== Accusations of Interference in Government Formation ====
Michael Murphy has been accused of interfering in the formation of the Bosnian government, specifically by actions perceived to undermine the electoral will of the Bosniak population through the suspension of the constitution through the OHR. These accusations have been levied by both opposition and ruling political stakeholders within Bosnia and Herzegovina and have not been publicly rebuffed.

==== Bosnian Gas Dispute ====
Murphy also faced criticism for his role in advocating for a law that would grant control of a natural gas pipeline project to BH Gas, a company predominantly controlled by Bosniaks.

The Heritage Foundation, a right-wing U.S. think tank, accused Murphy of prioritizing Bosniak interests over those of nationalist Bosnian Croats and Bosnian Serbs, potentially undermining U.S. foreign policy goals and benefiting Russia. The Heritage Foundation's letter, which was widely circulated, claimed that Murphy was acting at the behest of the Biden administration and that his actions would benefit Russia and Iran, while harming U.S.-Croatian relations. The letter also pointed to potential conflicts of interest involving Murphy and members of the Biden administration, citing connections to the Albright Stonebridge Group.

== Personal life ==
Murphy speaks Bosnian/Croatian/Serbian and French.

== See also ==
- Ambassadors of the United States

Diplomatic posts
Preceded by Eric Nelson	United States Ambassador to Bosnia and Herzegovina; 2022–2025	Vacant
