= 2026–27 Marshall Thundering Herd men's basketball team =

American college basketball season

2026–27 Marshall Thundering Herd men's basketball
- Conference: Sun Belt Conference
- Record: 1–2 (0–0 Sun Belt)
- Head coach: Cornelius Jackson (3rd season)
- Assistant coaches: Steve Snell; Scott Padgett; Ryan Taylor; Isaiah Carson
- Home arena: Cam Henderson Center

2026–27 Sun Belt Conference men's basketball standings
	Conf.				Overall
Team	W		L	PCT	W		L	PCT
Old Dominion	0	–	0	–	4	–	0	1.000
Appalachian State	0	–	0	–	3	–	1	.750
Louisiana Tech	0	–	0	–	2	–	1	.667
Coastal Carolina	0	–	0	–	2	–	2	.500
South Alabama	0	–	0	–	2	–	2	.500
Southern Miss	0	–	0	–	2	–	2	.500
Arkansas State	0	–	0	–	1	–	2	.333
James Madison	0	–	0	–	1	–	2	.333
Louisiana	0	–	0	–	1	–	2	.333
Marshall	0	–	0	–	1	–	2	.333
Georgia State	0	–	0	–	1	–	3	.250
Georgia Southern	0	–	0	–	1	–	3	.250
Troy	0	–	0	–	1	–	3	.250
Louisiana–Monroe	0	–	0	–	1	–	4	.200
† 2027 Sun Belt tournament winner As of November 14, 2026; Rankings from AP poll

The 2026–27 Marshall Thundering Herd men's basketball team will represent Marshall University during the 2026–27 NCAA Division I men's basketball season. The Thundering Herd, led by third-year head coach Cornelius Jackson, will play their home games at the Cam Henderson Center as members of the Sun Belt Conference.

== Previous season ==
The Thundering Herd finished the season 19–13, 11–7 in Sun Belt play to finish in a tie for second place. As the No. 2 seed in the Sun Belt tournament, they lost to Georgia Southern in the semifinals.

== Offseason ==
=== Departures ===
Name	Number	Pos.	Height	Weight	Year	Hometown	Notes
Wilson Dubinsky	3	G	6'3"	190	GS Senior	Ottawa, Ontario	Graduated
Wyatt Fricks	2	F	6'10"	222	RS Senior	Lawrenceville, Georgia	Graduated
Andrew Fuquay	4	F	6'8"	221	Junior	Detroit, Michigan	Transferred to Coastal Carolina
Caleb Hollenbeck	15	G	6'4"	189	Junior	Rapid City, South Dakota	Transferred to Tennessee Tech
Shamarrie Hugie	9	G	6'6"	188	Junior	Savannah, Georgia	Transferred to Austin Peay
Landen Joseph	6	G	6'2"	163	Freshman	Fort Lauderdale, Florida	Transferred to Dayton
Grant Moore	14	G	6'6"	200	RS Junior	Alpharetta, Georgia	Walk-on: did not return
Kai Spears	0	G	6'3"	175	RS Junior	Pittsburgh, Pennsylvania	Walk-on; transferred to West Liberty
Jalen Speer	50	G	6'1"	186	GS Senior	Gainesville, Florida	Graduated
Matt Van Komen	13	C	7'4"	245	GS Senior	Lehi, Utah	Graduated
Kaiden White	1	G	6'3"	189	Sophomore	Orlando, Florida	Transferred to Northwest Florida State

=== Incoming transfers ===
Name	Number	Pos.	Height	Weight	Year	Hometown	Previous School
Alex Charlotin	3	G	6'4"	180	Sophomore	Sainte-Marthe-sur-le-Lac, Quebec	Ellsworth
Boubacar Djigo	25	F	6'8"	237	Senior	Cleveland, Ohio	Concord
DeMarco Johnson	6	G	6'4"	176	Sophomore	Long Beach, California	Elon
Vasilije Kuridza	7	F	6'9"	235	Sophomore	Banja Luka, Bosnia and Herzegovina	Tulane
Colt Langdon	45	F	6'7"	230	RS Sophomore	Raleigh, North Carolina	NC State
Khaman Maker	14	C	7'1"	225	Junior	Juba, South Sudan	DePaul
Emmanuel Manyuon	1	G	6'2"	180	Junior	Austin, Minnesota	Pacific
Fazl Oshodi	0	G	6'3"	183	Junior	Swedesboro, New Jersey	Southern
Luke Rasmussen	4	G	6'8"	215	RS Junior	Haverford, Pennsylvania	Tulane

=== 2026 recruiting class ===
College recruiting
Name	Hometown	School	Height	Weight	Commit date
Kenan Gilao; PF	Thornhill, Ontario	King Heights Academy	6 ft 9 in (2.06 m)	190 lb (86 kg)	Apr 30, 2026
Kenan Gilao; PF	Recruit ratings: (NR)				
Mikel Bell Jr. SF	Port St. Lucie, Florida	TLAP Sports Academy	6 ft 8 in (2.03 m)	200 lb (91 kg)	Jun 19, 2026
Mikel Bell Jr. SF	Recruit ratings: (NR)				
Overall recruit ranking: 247Sports: 189 ESPN: NR
Note: In many cases, Scout, Rivals, 247Sports, On3, and ESPN may conflict in their listings of height and weight.; In these cases, the average was taken. ESPN grades are on a 100-point scale.; Sources: "Marshall Basketball Commitment List". Rivals.; "ESPN". ESPN.; "2026 Team Ranking". Rivals.

== Preseason ==
=== Preseason Sun Belt Conference poll ===
The Thundering Herd were picked to finish in fifth place in the conference's preseason poll. 5th year guard Noah Otshudi was named to the conference preseason first team.

Coaches poll
Predicted finish	Team (1st place Votes)
1	Arkansas State - 182 (3)
2	James Madison - 176 (9)
3	Troy - 143
4	South Alabama - 136
5	Marshall - 125
6	Louisiana - 117
7	Southern Miss - 109 (2)
8	App State - 105
9	Georgia Southern - 85
10	Georgia State - 79
11	Old Dominion - 76
12	Louisiana Tech - 64
13	Coastal Carolina - 58
14	ULM - 15

== Roster ==
2026–27 Marshall Thundering Herd men's basketball team
Players
Coaches

Pos.	#	Name	Height	Weight	Year	Previous school	Hometown
G	0	Fazl Oshodi	6 ft 3 in (1.91 m)	183 lb (83 kg)	Jr	Southern	Swedesboro, New Jersey
G	1	Emmanuel Manyuon	6 ft 2 in (1.88 m)	180 lb (82 kg)	Sr	Pacific	Austin, Minnesota
G	2	Bryce Slay	6 ft 6 in (1.98 m)	184 lb (83 kg)	So	Carmel Christian	Charlotte, North Carolina
G	3	Alex Charlotin	6 ft 4 in (1.93 m)	180 lb (82 kg)	Jr	Ellsworth CC	Sainte-Marthe-sur-le-Lac, Quebec
G	4	Luke Rasmussen	6 ft 8 in (2.03 m)	215 lb (98 kg)	RS Jr	Tulane	Haverford, Pennsylvania
G	5	Noah Otshudi	6 ft 4 in (1.93 m)	198 lb (90 kg)	GS	Western	Hamilton, Ontario
G	6	DeMarco Johnson	6 ft 4 in (1.93 m)	176 lb (80 kg)	So	Elon	Long Beach, California
F	7	Vasilije Kuridza	6 ft 9 in (2.06 m)	235 lb (107 kg)	So	Tulane	Banja Luka, Bosnia and Herzegovina
G	8	Mikal Bell Jr	6 ft 8 in (2.03 m)	200 lb (91 kg)	Fr	TLAP Sports Academy	Glen Carbon, Illinois
G	9	Kenan Gilao	6 ft 9 in (2.06 m)	180 lb (82 kg)	Fr	King Heights	Brampton, Ontario
F	11	Erich Harding	6 ft 10 in (2.08 m)	235 lb (107 kg)	Jr	Combine Academy	Charlotte, North Carolina
G	12	Will Moore	6 ft 7 in (2.01 m)	190 lb (86 kg)	Jr	West Forsyth	Cumming, Georgia
C	14	Khaman Maker	7 ft 1 in (2.16 m)	235 lb (107 kg)	Jr	DePaul	Juba, South Sudan
F	25	Boubacar Djigo	6 ft 8 in (2.03 m)	237 lb (108 kg)	Sr	Concord	Cleveland, Ohio
F	45	Colt Langdon	6 ft 7 in (2.01 m)	230 lb (104 kg)	RS So	NC State	Raleigh, North Carolina

Head coach

- Cornelius Jackson (Marshall)

Assistant coach(es)

- Steve Snell (Radford)
- Scott Padgett (Kentucky)
- Ryan Taylor (Marshall)
- Isaiah Carson (Valley Forge)

Legend

- (C) Team captain
- (S) Suspended
- (I) Ineligible
- (W) Walk-on
- Injured
- Current redshirt

Roster
Last update: 7/27/2024

== Schedule and results ==
Date time, TV	Rank^{#}	Opponent^{#}	Result	Record	High points	High rebounds	High assists	Site (attendance) city, state
Exhibition
October 22, 2026*; 7:00 p.m.		West Virginia Wesleyan	W 101–54	–	–	–	–	Cam Henderson Center; Huntington, WV
October 28, 2026*; 7:00 p.m.		Davis & Elkins	W 78–68	–	–	–	–	Cam Henderson Center; Huntington, WV
Regular season
November 2, 2026*; 7:00 p.m., ESPN+		Buffalo; MAC-SBC Challenge	W 92–65	1–0	22 – Manyuon	11 – Manyuon	6 – Otshudi	Cam Henderson Center (3,517); Huntington, WV
November 7, 2026*; 2:00 p.m., ESPN+		Toledo	L 76-81	1-1	23 – Slay	13 – Harding	4 – Tied	Cam Henderson Center (3,727); Huntington, WV
November 9, 2026*; 6:00 p.m., BTN		at Ohio State	L 74-84	1-2	27 – Otshudi	6 – Rasmussen	4 – Charlotin	Value City Arena (7,984); Columbus, OH
November 14, 2026*; 1:00 p.m., ESPN+		at Youngstown State						Beeghly Center; Youngstown, OH
November 17, 2026*; 7:00 p.m., ESPN+		East Tennessee State						Cam Henderson Center; Huntington, WV
November 20, 2026*; 9:00 p.m., ACCN		at North Carolina						Dean Smith Center; Chapel Hill, NC
November 25, 2026*; 4:00 p.m., ESPN+		Prairie View A&M						Cam Henderson Center; Huntington, WV
November 28, 2026*; 4:00 p.m., ESPN+		East Texas A&M						Cam Henderson Center; Huntington, WV
December 2, 2026*; 7:00 p.m., ESPN+		UNC Wilmington						Cam Henderson Center; Huntington, WV
December 5, 2026*; 7:00 p.m., ESPN+		Bethune–Cookman						Cam Henderson Center; Huntington, WV
December 12, 2026*; 7:00 p.m., ESPN+		Kentucky Christian						Cam Henderson Center; Huntington, WV
December 16, 2026; 7:00 p.m., ESPN+		Old Dominion						Cam Henderson Center; Huntington, WV
December 19, 2026; 4:00 p.m., ESPN+		at Louisiana						Cajundome; Lafayette, LA
December 23, 2026*; 7:00 p.m., ESPN+		West Virginia Tech						Cam Henderson Center; Huntington, WV
December 31, 2026; 4:00 p.m.		South Alabama						Cam Henderson Center; Huntington, WV
January 2, 2027; 4:00 p.m.		Arkansas State						Cam Henderson Center; Huntington, WV
January 7, 2027; 7:30 p.m., ESPN+		at Louisiana–Monroe						Fant–Ewing Coliseum; Monroe, LA
January 9, 2027; 4:00 p.m., ESPN+		at Louisiana Tech						Thomas Assembly Center; Ruston, LA
January 14, 2027; 3:00 p.m.		at Georgia State						GSU Convocation Center; Atlanta, GA
January 16, 2027; 7:00 p.m., ESPN+		Georgia Southern						Cam Henderson Center; Huntington, WV
January 21, 2027; 7:00 p.m., ESPN+		at James Madison						Atlantic Union Bank Center; Harrisonburg, VA
January 23, 2027; 3:00 p.m., ESPN+		at Coastal Carolina						HTC Center; Conway, SC
January 28, 2027; 7:00 p.m., ESPN+		Georgia State						Cam Henderson Center; Huntington, WV
January 30, 2027; 7:00 p.m., ESPN+		Appalachian State						Cam Henderson Center; Huntington, WV
February 3, 2027; 7:00 p.m.		at Georgia Southern						Hill Convocation Center; Statesboro, GA
February 6, 2027*		at TBD; MAC-SBC Challenge						TBD; TBD
February 11, 2027; 7:00 p.m., ESPN+		Coastal Carolina						Cam Henderson Center; Huntington, WV
February 13, 2027; 7:00 p.m., ESPN+		James Madison						Cam Henderson Center; Huntington, WV
February 18, 2027; 6:30 p.m., ESPN+		at Appalachian State						Holmes Center; Boone, NC
February 20, 2027; 7:00 p.m., ESPN+		at Old Dominion						Chartway Arena; Norfolk, VA
February 26, 2027; 9:00 p.m., ESPN+		Troy						Cam Henderson Center; Huntington, WV
Sun Belt tournament
March 2, 2027; TBA		vs. TBD						Pensacola Bay Center; Pensacola, FL
*Non-conference game. ^{#}Rankings from AP Poll. (#) Tournament seedings in parentheses. All times are in Eastern Time.
