= Eric G. Nelson =

American diplomat

Eric Nelson
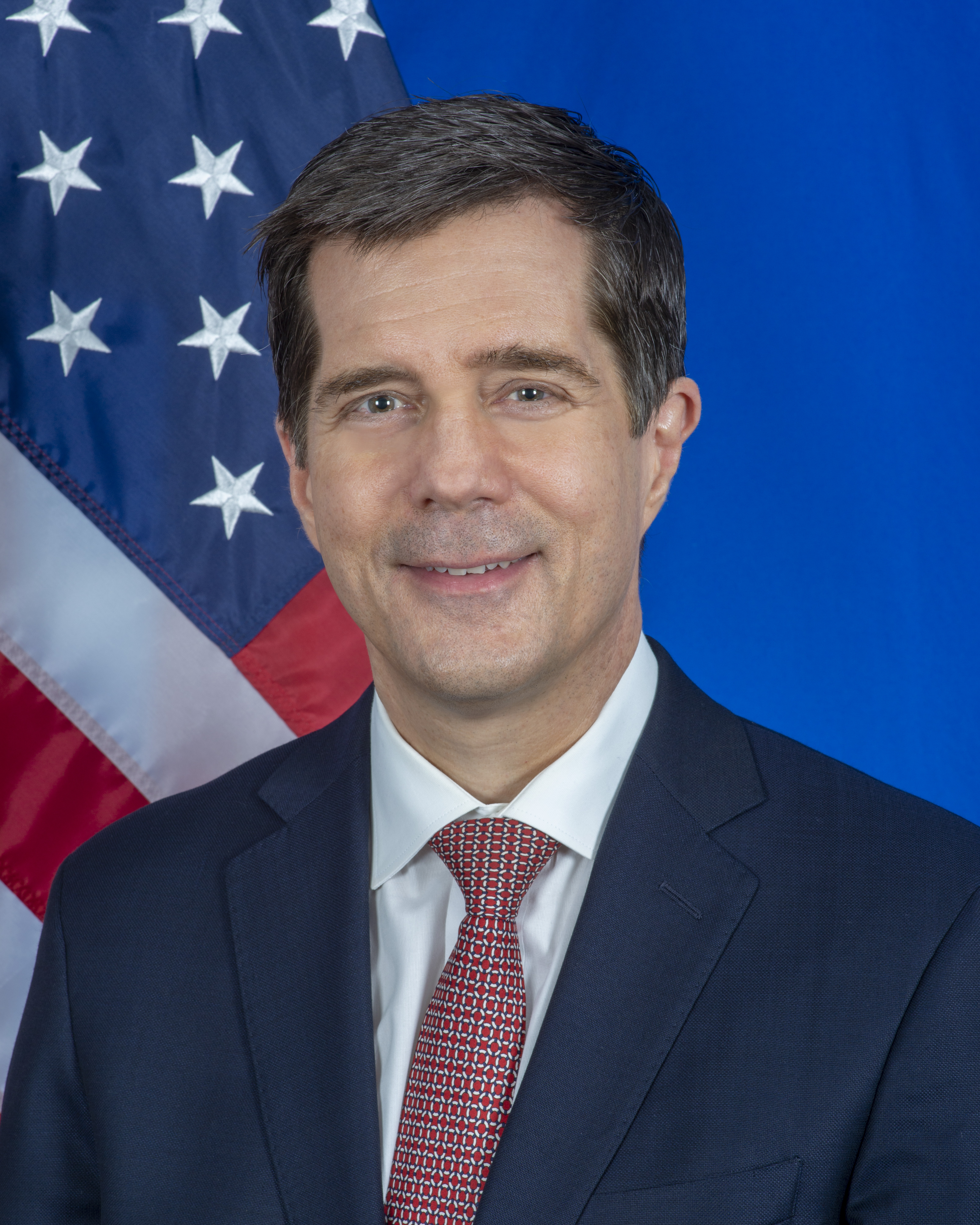

United States Ambassador to Bosnia and Herzegovina
- In office February 19, 2019 – February 1, 2022
- President: Donald Trump; Joe Biden
- Preceded by: Maureen Cormack
- Succeeded by: Michael Murphy

Personal details
- Born: Eric George Nelson
- Education: Rice University (BS); University of Texas, Austin (MBA)

Eric George Nelson is an American diplomat who served as the United States Ambassador to Bosnia and Herzegovina from 2019 to 2022.

== Education ==
Nelson received his Bachelor of Science degree in chemical engineering from Rice University and his Master of Business Administration from The University of Texas at Austin - Red McCombs School of Business.

== Career ==
Nelson began his career in as a Peace Corps volunteer in Liberia, West Africa. In 1990, he began working for the State Department. He has worked in seven United States missions overseas including in the U.S. Embassy in Santo Domingo, Dominican Republic, Consulate General of the United States, Munich and in the U.S. Embassy in Mexico City.

He served as Deputy Chief of Mission of the U.S. Embassy in Costa Rica from August 2010, through June 2013 and then as Chargé d'Affaires until August of that year.

=== Ambassador to Bosnia and Herzegovina ===
On August 23, 2018, President Donald Trump announced his intent to nominate Nelson as United States Ambassador to Bosnia and Herzegovina. On January 2, 2019, the Senate confirmed him by voice vote. On February 18, 2019, he presented his credentials to the Bosnian government. Nelson was one of five openly gay ambassadors appointed under the Trump administration. He left his post on February 1, 2022.

Nelson called for a new Constitution of Bosnia and Herzegovina, stating that the current constitution is an obstacle for Bosnia to join the "Transatlantic community". He added, "There is a whole range of constitutional issues which need to be dealt with so the country can fulfill Transatlantic standards. Many of those issues are difficult to solve, but none of them is impossible."

On April 1, 2021, Nelson met with Bosnian Presidency member Željko Komšić, with whom he spoke on the importance of a transparent and inclusive electoral reform process and Bosnia and Herzegovina's Reform Program as an opportunity to attract Ally support for reforms consistent with the country's EU path. On December 7, 2021, Nelson met with Bosnian Minister of Defence Sifet Podžić and U.S. envoy Gabriel Escobar, to discuss the political situation in Bosnia and Herzegovina, and the prospect of modernizing the country's Armed Forces.

== Personal life ==
Nelson speaks Spanish, German, and Italian.

== See also ==
- List of ambassadors appointed by Donald Trump

Diplomatic posts
Preceded by Maureen Cormack	United States Ambassador to Bosnia and Herzegovina; 2019–2022	Succeeded by Michael Murphy
