= Xaverian High School =

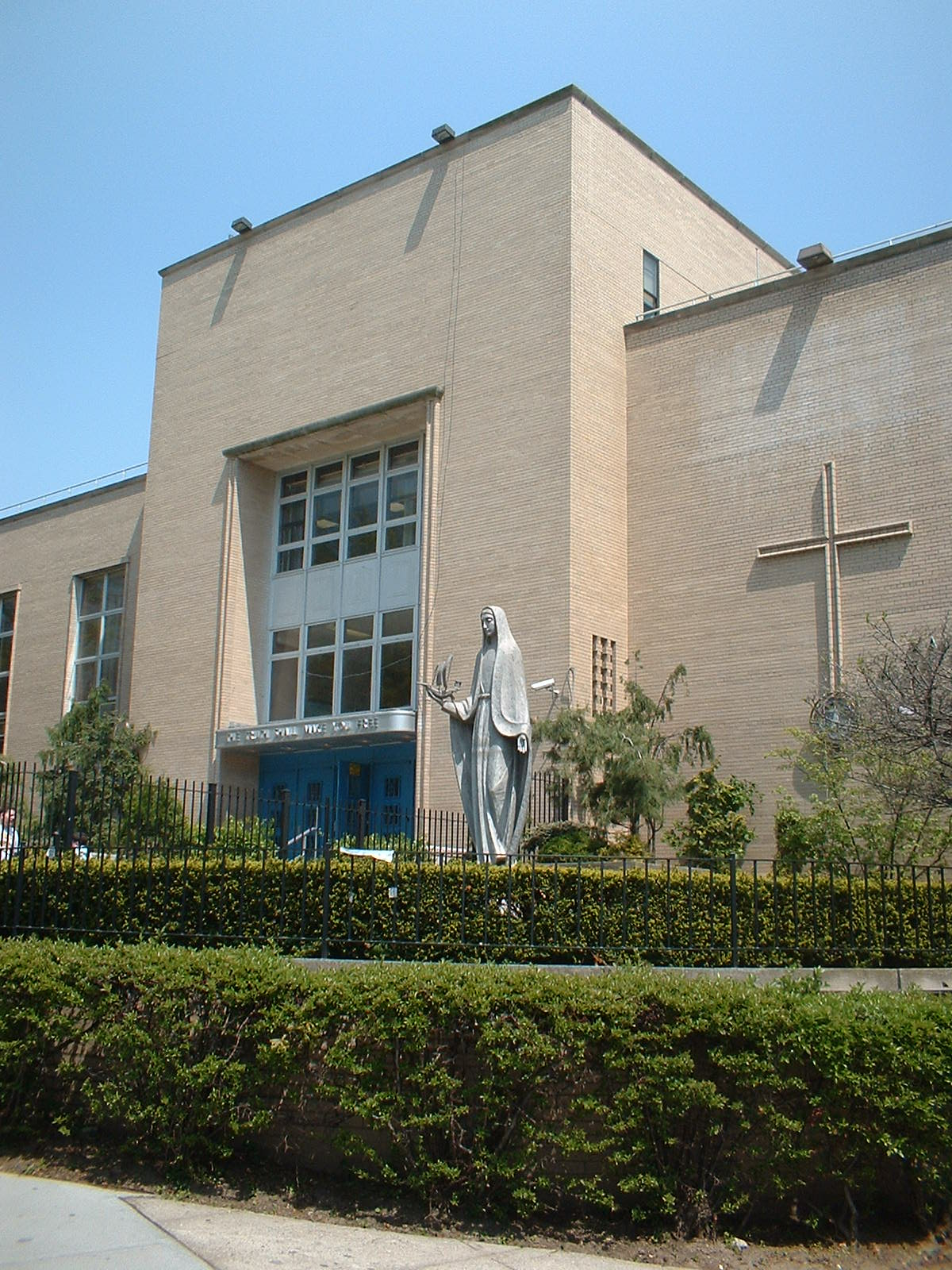

Location
- 7100 Shore Road; New York City (Bay Ridge, Brooklyn), New York 11209; United States; 40°38′12″N 74°2′10″W

Information
- Type: Private
- Motto: "The Truth Shall Make You Free." (John 8:32)
- Religious affiliations: Roman Catholic; Xaverian Brothers
- Established: 1957
- President: Robert Alesi
- Principal: Daniel Sharib
- Chaplain: Sean Suckiel
- Teaching staff: 91.8 (on an FTE basis)
- Grades: 6-12
- Student to teacher ratio: 18:1
- Colors: Blue and Gold
- Athletics conference: Catholic High School Athletic Association
- Mascot: Clipper Ship
- Team name: Clippers
- Accreditation: Middle States Association of Colleges and Schools
- Tuition: $19,300
- Affiliation: National Catholic Educational Association
- Website: http://www.xaverian.org

Xaverian High School is an independent Catholic high school located in the Bay Ridge neighborhood of Brooklyn, New York, serving grades 6 through 12. Grades 9-12 offer a college preparatory program and grades 6-8 are middle school.

== History ==
The school was founded in 1957 by the Xaverian Brothers. The school is a member of the Catholic High School Athletic Association (CHSAA). Xaverian is governed by a president and board of trustees. It is operated independently of the Roman Catholic Diocese of Brooklyn. As of 2021–22 the school had a total student population of 1,625. 1,157 students identified as White, 227 as Hispanic, 101 as Asian, 65 as Black, 4 as Native Hawaiian/Pacific Islander, and 71 as two or more races.

On March 5, 2015, the board of trustees made a decision to incorporate co-education to the high school, beginning in 2016. The school's first boys and girls class was admitted for the 2016–2017 school year. Xaverian High School also has a sister school located in Bruges, Belgium called the Sint-Franciscus-Xaveriusinstituut and maintains a yearly cultural exchange program with the school allowing exchange students to come to New York City in the fall and Xaverian students to go to Belgium in the winter.

Beyond academics, business, and athletics, Xaverian maintains a strong tradition of public service, with a notable proportion of its alumni pursuing careers within the New York City Police Department (NYPD) and the Fire Department of the City of New York (FDNY).

== September 11th Memorial ==
In the September 11, 2001 attacks on the World Trade Center, Xaverian lost 23 alumni—which, alongside Monsignor Farrell High School on Staten Island (which also lost 23 alumni), represents the highest casualty toll suffered by any secondary school in the New York metropolitan area. Among the victims from Xaverian were four firefighters from the New York City Fire Department who were killed during rescue operations.

In 2002, Xaverian dedicated a permanent 9/11 Alumni Memorial on its campus. The memorial consists of an 8-foot-tall, 7.5-foot-wide polished black granite featuring an eternal flame at its base. The central panel depicts the Twin Towers behind a crucifix, mounted above a section of structural steel recovered from the North Tower and donated by the New York City Office of Emergency Management. The left panel is engraved with the names of the 23 alumni, while the right panel bears the inscription, "All Lost Some, Some Lost All." At the start of the academic year each September, Xaverian holds an annual 9/11 Memorial Mass in its Performing Arts Center to honor the alumni victims and all those killed in the attacks, gathering family members, school leadership, and the broader community.

== Notable alumni ==
- Tom Abinanti, politician, lawyer, member of the New York State Assembly, 1964
- Oday Aboushi, NFL player
- Brian Alvey, internet entrepreneur, 1987
- Rich Aurilia, professional MLB baseball player, 1989
- Michael Badalucco, Emmy-winning actor, 1972
- Scott Baio, actor, 1978
- Pedro Beato, baseball player
- Justin Brannan, New York City Councilmember for the New York City's 43rd City Council district in Bay Ridge, Brooklyn
- Jason Calacanis, internet entrepreneur (CEO and co-founder of Weblogs, Inc., CEO of Mahalo), 1988
- John Chell, Chief of Department for the New York City Police Department
- Bill Corbett, writer and performer on Mystery Science Theater 3000
- Pete Davidson, actor, comedian, and cast member of Saturday Night Live, 2011
- Charles L. English, United States Ambassador to Bosnia and Herzegovenia
- Levance Fields, college basketball player, 2005
- Charles Robert Hadlock, applied mathematician, 1964
- Pedro Hernández, major league baseball player
- Mike Longabardi, NBA assistant coach, 2x NBA champion (2008, 2016)
- Ruddy Lugo, major league baseball player
- Chris Manno, retired MLB pitcher
- Ignacyo Matynia, actor, 2010
- Chris Mullin, "Dream Team" member and NBA player, former head coach of the St. John's Red Storm, 1981
- Tito Nieves, Latin music star
- Sterley Stanley, member of the New Jersey General Assembly
- Chris Taft, NBA player, 2003
