= Patrick S. Moon =

American diplomat (born 1950)

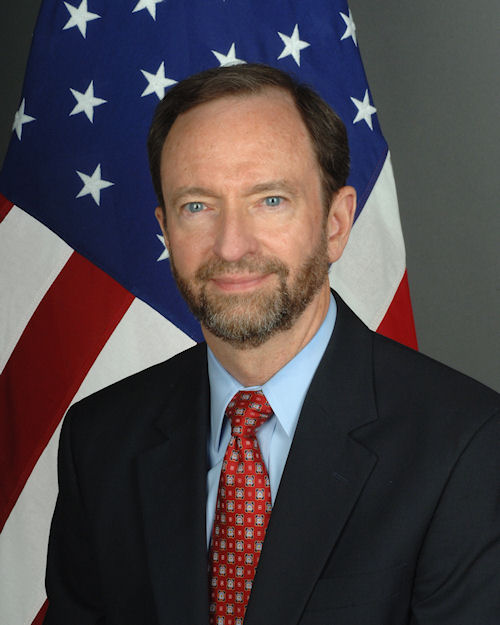
- Patrick S. Moon ambassador

United States Ambassador to Bosnia and Herzegovina
- In office 2010–2013
- President: Barack Obama
- Succeeded by: Maureen Cormack

Personal details
- Born: 1950 (age 75–76)
- Education: USAFA

Patrick S. Moon (born 1950) is a retired Senior Foreign Service Officer who served as the U.S. Ambassador to Bosnia and Herzegovina from 2010 to 2013.

Originally from Oklahoma City, he graduated from the U.S. Air Force Academy in 1972 and earned an M.A. degree in International Relations at the Fletcher School of Law and Diplomacy at Tufts University. Moon served as an officer in the U.S. Air Force for six years.

== Career ==
Moon was appointed Deputy Assistant Secretary of State in the Bureau of South and Central Asian Affairs six months after being designated Coordinator for Afghanistan. Moon served as the Executive Secretary of the U.S. Negotiating Group for Strategic Nuclear Arms Negotiations (START) in Geneva from 1986 to 1988.
