= South Alabama Jaguars men's basketball =

Basketball team

2026–27 South Alabama Jaguars men's basketball team
- University: University of South Alabama
- Head coach: Richie Riley (9th season)
- Location: Mobile, Alabama
- Arena: Mitchell Center (capacity: 10,041)
- Conference: Sun Belt Conference
- Nickname: Jaguars
- Colors: Blue, white, and red

NCAA Division I tournament round of 32
- 1979, 1989

NCAA Division I tournament appearances
- 1979, 1980, 1989, 1991, 1997, 1998, 2006, 2008

Conference tournament champions
- 1989, 1991, 1997, 1998, 2006

Conference regular-season champions
- 1979, 1980, 1981, 1989, 1991, 1997, 1998, 2000, 2007, 2008, 2025

Conference division champions
- Sun Belt West: 2001, 2006; Sun Belt East: 2007, 2008

Uniforms
Home	Away

The South Alabama Jaguars men's basketball program has competed in the Sun Belt Conference since 1978 when the league was formed. Since 1968, the Jaguars have compiled an overall record of 694–507 (.580). South Alabama has won the Sun Belt Conference championship five times and reached the NCAA tournament eight times. The Jaguars last NCAA tournament appearance was in 2008.

== History ==
Mitchell Center in Mobile, Alabama - Home of the South Alabama Jaguars

The University of South Alabama is a public, doctoral-level university in Mobile, Alabama, United States. The school was founded in 1963 and began its men's basketball program in the fall of 1968 under former Auburn standout and Alabama Sports Hall of Fame member Rex Frederick.

The Jags have participated in the NCAA tournament eight times with a record of 1–8. Their last tournament appearance was in 2008 when they lost to seventh seeded Butler 81–61 in the NCAA Birmingham Regional First Round.

The Jaguars have been invited to play in the NIT Tournament four times and have a record of 3–4 in the NIT.

== Postseason results ==
=== NCAA tournament results ===
The Jaguars have appeared in the NCAA tournament eight times. Their combined record is 1–8.

Year	Round	Opponent	Result
1979	Second Round	Louisville	L 66–69
1980	First Round	Alcorn State	L 62–70
1989	First Round; Second Round	Alabama; Michigan	W 86–84; L 82–91
1991	First Round	Utah	L 72–82
1997	First Round	Arizona	L 57–65
1998	First Round	Illinois	L 51–64
2006	First Round	Florida	L 50–76
2008	First Round	Butler	L 61–81

=== NIT results ===
The Jaguars have appeared in the National Invitation Tournament (NIT) five times. Their combined record is 3–5.

Year	Round	Opponent	Result
1981	First Round; Second Round; Quarterfinals	Texas–Arlington; Georgia; Tulsa	W 74–71; W 73–72; L 68–69
1984	First Round; Second Round	Florida; Virginia Tech	W 88–87; L 66–68
2001	First Round	Toledo	L 67–76
2007	First Round	Syracuse	L 73–79
2026	First Round	Auburn	L 67–78

=== CIT results ===
The Jaguars have appeared in the CollegeInsider.com Postseason Tournament (CIT) one time. Their record is 0–1.

Year	Round	Opponent	Result
2013	First Round	Tulane	L 73–84

=== The Basketball Classic results ===
The Jaguars have appeared in one The Basketball Classic Tournament. Their combined record is 2–1.

Year	Round	Opponent	Result
2022	First Round; Second Round; Semifinals	Southeastern Louisiana; USC Upstate; Coastal Carolina	W 70–68; W 83–79; L 68–69 (OT)

== Notable players ==
=== NBA ===
South Alabama has had 5 former players who have gone on to play in the NBA.

Name	Years in NBA
Terry Catledge	1986–1993
Kelvin Cato	1998–2007
Ed Rains	1982–1983
Dexter Shouse	1990
Rory White	1983–1987

=== International leagues ===
- Freddie Goldstein or Freddie Lish (born 1988), Thai-American basketball player
- Sam Iorio (born 1998), American-Israeli basketball player in the Israeli Basketball Premier League
- Augustine Rubit (born 1989), basketball player in the Israeli Basketball Premier League

== Coaches ==
USA Basketball Coaching History
Tenure	Coach	Yrs	Won	Lost	Pct.	Conf.
1968–1970	Frederick	2	19	29	.396	–
1970–1975	Taylor	5	75	53	.586	–
1975–1984	Ellis	9	171	84	.671	–
1984–1987	Hanks	3	45	43	.511	–
1987–1994	Arrow	8	114	93	.551	–
1994–1995	Prada	1	8	15	.348	–
1995–1997	Musselman	2	35	24	.593	–
1997–2002	Weltlich	5	81	65	.554	–
2002–2007	Pelphrey	5	80	67	.544	44–40
2007–2012	Arrow	3	63	34	.629	34–20
2012–2013	Price	1	12	8	.600	12-7
2013–2018	Graves	5	67	95	.414	21-36
2018–present	Riley	6	100	72	.584	49–40
Totals		45	748	546	.578	–

Cliff Ellis was head coach at the University of South Alabama from 1975 to 1984. He was the all-time winning coach in South Alabama history with a 171–84 (.671) record during nine seasons until Coach Ronnie Arrow surpassed him in 2010. When Ellis became head coach, the administrators at South Alabama were thinking of dropping to Division II. Four years later, he had the Jaguars in the NCAA tournament and six seasons later, they were ranked in the nation's top 10. Ellis, also was the athletic director during part of his tenure, led the Jaguars to three Sun Belt titles, two NCAA Tournament appearances and two NITs.

Former NBA Minnesota Timberwolves coach, Bill Musselman returned to the NCAA after a 25-year absence and led the Jaguars to back-to-back NCAA tournament bids in his two years as coach. Musselman's 1997 South Alabama team went 23–7 and nearly upset eventual champion University of Arizona in the opening round of the NCAA tournament.

Bob Weltlich was named interim coach at South Alabama in 1997 following Musselman's sudden resignation. Weltlich coached the Jags from 1997 to 2002 and compiled a record of 81–65 (.559) and three 20-win seasons.

John Pelphrey spent five seasons as head coach at South Alabama. In 2005–06 the Jaguars defeated Western Kentucky University in the Sun Belt Conference tournament championship game, earning USA's first NCAA tournament bid since 1998. The Jaguars lost to the tournament champions, Florida in the round of 64. In 2007, Pelphrey led the Jags to an NIT birth which resulted in a first-round loss to Syracuse (79–73). South Alabama finished the year with a 20–12 record, giving Pelphrey an overall record of 80–67 with the Jags and an offer to coach for the University of Arkansas in the SEC.

In his first eight seasons as the Jaguars coach, Ronnie Arrow compiled a record of 114–93 (.551) and was named Sun Belt Coach of the Year in 1989 and 1991. His squads led the Sun Belt Conference in scoring four of his seven seasons at South Alabama. His 1988–89 squad set a school and league record 91 points per game average and five of his seven teams tallied at least 80 points per game. Since his return in 2007, Ronnie Arrow has compiled a 63–34 (64.9%) record and became the all-time winningest coach in South Alabama history with a 177–127 record (11 seasons). He also garnered an at-large bid to the 2008 NCAA tournament, the first for Sun Belt Conference is many years.

Arrow retired December 19, 2012 and was replaced by Jeff Price on an interim basis. On March 25, 2013, Matthew Graves was named as the new head coach of the Jaguars.

On March 8, 2018, Graves was fired after 5 seasons after a 65–96 record with no postseason appearances. Exactly 1 week later, the Jaguars hired former Nicholls State head coach Richie Riley for the job.

== Arena ==
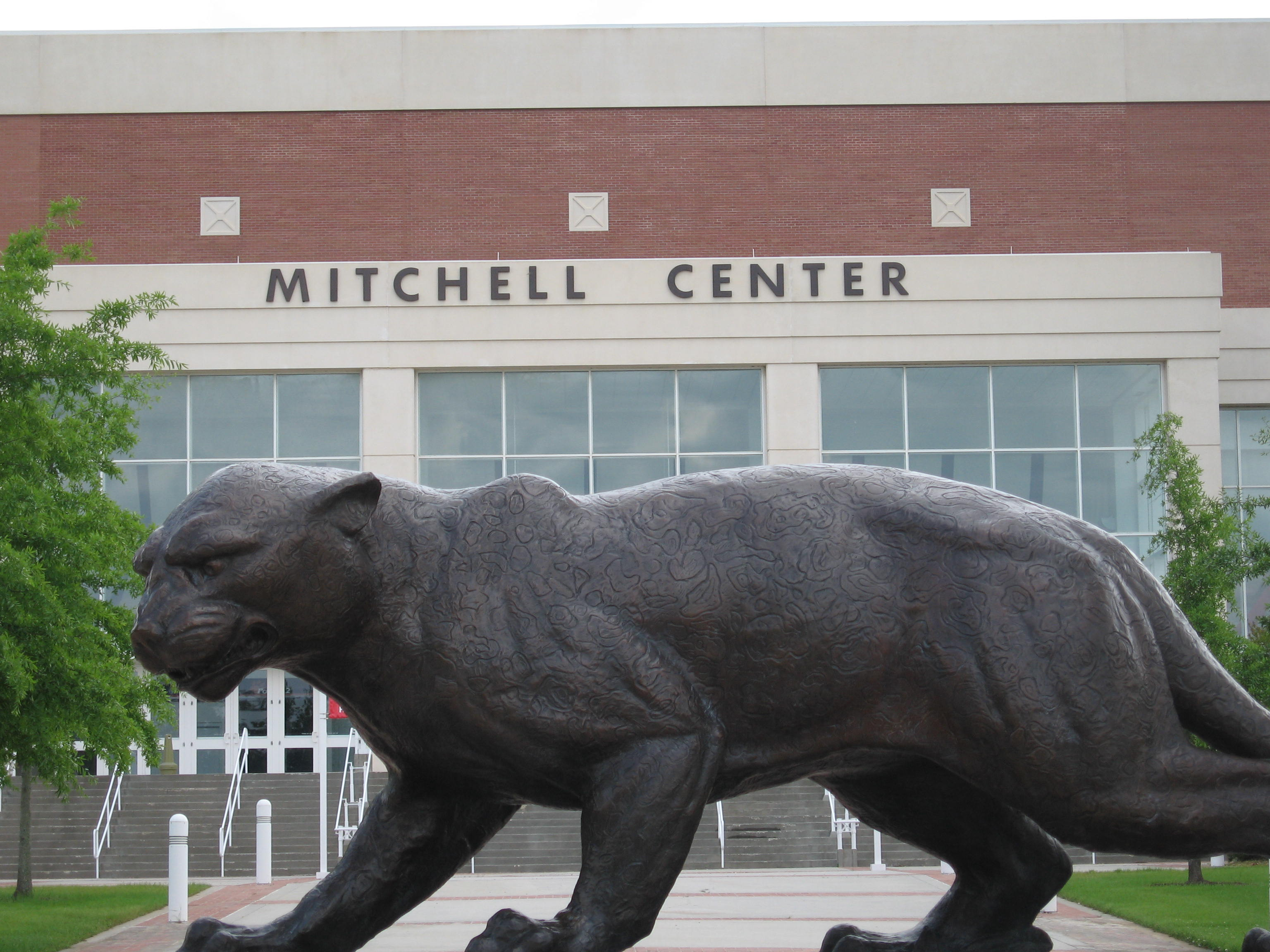
Mitchell Center North Entrance

The Mitchell Center 10,041-seat multi-purpose arena was built in 1998. It is home to the University of South Alabama Jaguars men's and women's basketball teams. The 2001 and 2008 Sun Belt Conference men's basketball tournaments were held at the Mitchell Center.

Prior to moving into the Mitchell Center, the Jaguars had played their home games from 1968 to 1998 at the Jag Gym and the Mobile Civic Center.

== Mascot ==
In 1965 the South Alabama Board of Trustees selected the Jaguar as the university's official mascot and during the late 1960s, USA housed a live Jaguar on the campus. However, the university later decided against housing a live animal on campus after Mischka, the jaguar, was accidentally set free on the campus after someone made the mistake of leaving her pen door unlocked.

In the 1971 Retrospect (Yearbook) a person is seen wearing a jaguar costume with a paper mache head covered with spotted fur. By 1972, the costume had changed to a look that showed the persons face and included a fur hat and body. In the late 1970s a mascot-naming contest was held and the name South Paw was chosen. In 1986 USA began its first structured mascot program, building the image of South Paw that exists today. A new costume with an enlarged soft head with comical expression have now replaced the old paper mache head.

Miss Pawla joined South Paw in 1992. Today, the duo of South Paw and Miss Pawla represent the Jaguars at USA athletic competitions and other events throughout the Mobile community.
