= 1992–93 Big East Conference men's basketball season =

American college basketball season

1992–93 Big East Conference Men's Basketball Season
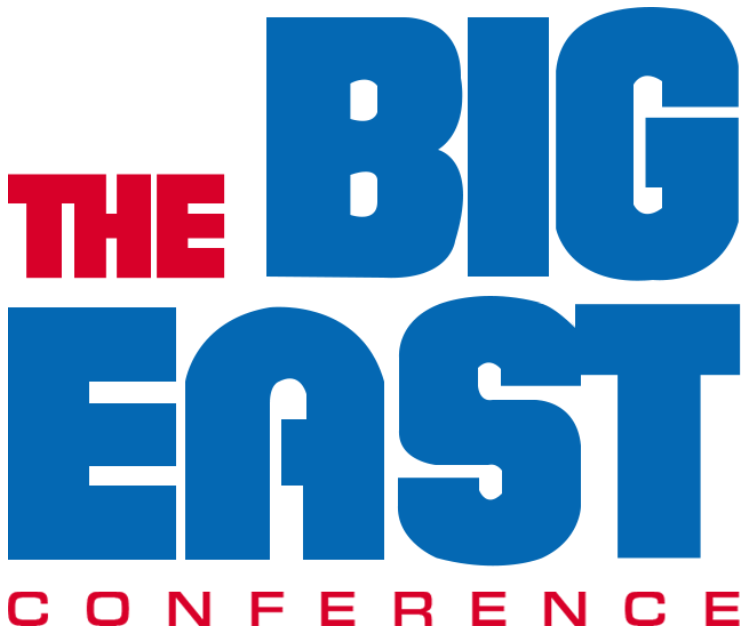
- League: NCAA Division I
- Sport: Basketball
- Duration: November 18, 1992 through March 14, 1993
- Teams: 10
- TV partner: ESPN

Regular Season
- Champion: Seton Hall (14–4)
- Season MVP: Terry Dehere – Seton Hall

Tournament
- Champions: Seton Hall
- Finals MVP: Terry Dehere – Seton Hall

Basketball seasons
- 1991–92 1993–94

1992–93 Big East men's basketball standings
	Conf.				Overall
Team	W		L	PCT	W		L	PCT
No. 6 Seton Hall †	14	–	4	.778	28	–	7	.800
St. John's	12	–	6	.667	19	–	11	.633
Syracuse	10	–	8	.556	20	–	9	.690
Connecticut	9	–	9	.500	15	–	13	.536
Providence	9	–	9	.500	20	–	13	.606
Pittsburgh	9	–	9	.500	17	–	11	.607
Boston College	9	–	9	.500	18	–	13	.581
Georgetown	8	–	10	.444	20	–	13	.606
Miami	7	–	11	.389	10	–	17	.370
Villanova	3	–	15	.167	8	–	19	.296
† 1993 Big East tournament winner As of April 5, 1993; Rankings from AP Poll

The 1992–93 Big East Conference men's basketball season was the 14th in conference history, and involved its ten full-time member schools.

Seton Hall was the regular-season champion with a record of 14–4. Seton Hall also won the Big East tournament championship.

== Season summary & highlights ==
- Seton Hall finished as the regular-season champion with a record of 14–4. It was the second regular-season championship or co-championship and first outright championship for Seton Hall.
- Seton Hall won its second Big East tournament championship.

== Head coaches ==
School	Coach	Season	Notes
Boston College	Jim O'Brien	7th	
Connecticut	Jim Calhoun	7th	
Georgetown	John Thompson, Jr.	21st	
Miami	Leonard Hamilton	3rd	
Pittsburgh	Paul Evans	7th	
Providence	Rick Barnes	5th	
St. John's	Brian Mahoney	1st	Big East Coach of the Year
Seton Hall	P. J. Carlesimo	11th	
Syracuse	Jim Boeheim	17th	
Villanova	Steve Lappas	1st	

== Rankings ==
Seton Hall spent the entire season in the Associated Press poll Top 25, both starting and finishing the season as No. 6. Boston College, Connecticut, Georgetown, Pittsburgh, St. John's, and Syracuse also spent time in the Top 25.

1992–93 Big East Conference Weekly Rankings Key: ██ Increase in ranking. ██ Decrease in ranking.
AP Poll	Pre	11/23	11/30	12/7	12/14	12/21	12/28	1/4	1/11	1/18	1/25	2/1	2/8	2/15	2/22	3/1	3/8	Final
Boston College									22				21					
Connecticut	16	16	25		24	22	23	19	15	17	22							
Georgetown	12	13	14	11	11	11	10	17	20	18	21	23						
Miami																		
Pittsburgh								24		20	13	15	17	17	25			
Providence																		
St. John's														25		25		
Seton Hall	6	6	6	7	7	7	7	7	7	10	9	14	19	16	14	10	9	6
Syracuse	18	17	17	15	14	13	12	21	24									
Villanova																		

== Regular-season statistical leaders ==
Scoring
Name	School	PPG
Terry Dehere	SHU	22.0
Lawrence Moten	Syr	17.9
Donyell Marshall	Conn	17.0
Othella Harrington	GU	16.8
Scott Burrell	Conn	16.1

Rebounding
Name	School	RPG
Michael Smith	Prov	11.4
Othella Harrington	GU	8.8
Shawnelle Scott	SJU	8.8
Chris McNeal	Pitt	8.5
Donyell Marshall	Conn	7.8

Assists
Name	School	APG
David Cain	SJU	7.1
Joey Brown	GU	6.2
Michael Gardner	Miami	5.7
Abdul Abdullah	Prov	5.7
Kevin Ollie	Conn	5.6

Steals
Name	School	SPG
Jonathan Haynes	Vill	2.7
Joey Brown	GU	2.5
Scott Burrell	Conn	2.4
David Cain	SJU	2.4
Jerry McCullough	Pitt	2.3

Blocks
Name	School	BPG
Constantin Popa	Mia	3.1
Conrad McRae	Syr	2.7
Luther Wright	SHU	2.2
Donyell Marshall	Conn	2.1
Eric Mobley	Pitt	1.9

Field Goals
Name	School	FG%
Shawnelle Scott	SJU	.585
Bill Curley	BC	.580
Othella Harrington	GU	.573
Constantin Popa	Mia	.527
Donyell Marshall	Conn	.500

3-Pt Field Goals
Name	School	3FG%
Steven Edwards	Mia	.382
(no other qualifiers)

Free Throws
Name	School	FT%
Bill Curley	BC	.849
Howard Eisley	BC	.834
Artūras Karnišovas	SHU	.832
Donyell Marshall	Conn	.829
Terry Dehere	SHU	.818

== Postseason ==
=== Big East tournament ===
==== Seeding ====
Seeding in the Big East tournament was based on conference record, with tiebreakers applied as necessary. Teams seeded seventh through tenth played a first-round game, and the other six teams received a bye into the quarterfinals.

The tournament's seeding was as follows: (1) Seton Hall, (2) St. John's, (3) Syracuse, (4) Connecticut, (5) Providence, (6) Pittsburgh, (7) Boston College, (8) Georgetown, (9) Miami, (10) Villanova.

==== Bracket ====
First round March 11, 1993
8	Georgetown	67
9	Miami	40
7	Boston College	74^{OT}
10	Villanova	70

Quarterfinals; March 12, 1993
1	#9 Seton Hall	83
8	Georgetown	69
4	Connecticut	55
5	Providence	73
3	Syracuse	55
6	Pittsburgh	50
2	St. John's	76
7	Boston College	56

Semifinals; March 13, 1993
1	#9 Seton Hall	69
5	Providence	60
3	Syracuse	84
2	St. John's	72

Championship Game; March 14, 1993
1	#9 Seton Hall	103
3	Syracuse	70

=== NCAA tournament ===
Three Big East teams received bids to the NCAA Tournament. Pittsburgh lost in the first round and St. John's and Seton Hall in the second round.

School	Region	Seed	Round 1	Round 2
Seton Hall	Southeast	2	15 Tennessee State, W 81–59	7 Western Kentucky, L 72–68
St. John's	East	5	12 Texas Tech, W 85–67	4 Arkansas, L 80–74
Pittsburgh	Southeast	9	8 Utah, L 86–65	

=== National Invitation Tournament ===
Four Big East teams received bids to the National Invitation Tournament, which did not yet have seeding. They played in three different unnamed brackets. Connecticut lost in the first round. Providence defeated Boston College in the quarterfinals, then lost in the semifinals. Georgetown advanced to the NIT championship game for the first time in school history but lost to Minnesota and finished as the tournament runner-up.

School	Round 1	Round 2	Quarterfinals	Semifinals	Final
Georgetown	Arizona State, W 78–68	UTEP, W 71–44	Miami (OH), W 66–53	UAB, W 45–41	Minnesota, L 62–61
Providence	James Madison, W 73–61	West Virginia, W 68–67	Boston College, W 75–58	Minnesota, L 76–70	
Boston College	Niagara, W 87–83	Rice, W 101–68	Providence, L 75–58		
Connecticut	Jackson State, L 90–88^{(OT)}				

== Awards and honors ==
=== Big East Conference ===
Player of the Year:

- * Terry Dehere, Seton Hall, G, Sr.

Defensive Player of the Year:

- Jerry Walker, Seton Hall, F, Sr.

Rookie of the Year:

- Othella Harrington, Georgetown, C, Fr.

Coach of the Year:

- Brian Mahoney, St. John's (1st season)

All-Big East First Team

- Bill Curley, Boston College, F Jr., 6 ft 9 in (206 cm), 220 lb (100 kg), Boston, Mass.
- Donyell Marshall, Connecticut, F, So., 6 ft 9 in (206 cm), 245 lb (111 kg), Reading, Pa.
- Terry Dehere, Seton Hall, G Sr., 6 ft 2 in (188 cm), 190 lb (86 kg), Jersey City, N.J.
- David Cain, St. John's, G Sr., 6 ft 0 in (183 cm), 175 lb (79 kg), The Bronx, N.Y.
- Lawrence Moten, Syracuse, G, So., 6 ft 5 in (196 cm), 185 lb (84 kg), Washington, D.C.

All-Big East Second Team:

- Howard Eisley, Boston College, G Jr., 6 ft 2 in (188 cm), 185 lb (84 kg), Detroit, Mich.
- Jerry McCullough, Pittsburgh, G, So., 5 ft 11 in (180 cm), 175 lb (79 kg), New York, N.Y.
- Michael Smith, Providence, F Jr., 6 ft 8 in (203 cm), 230 lb (104 kg), Washington, D.C.
- Artūras Karnišovas, Seton Hall, F Jr., 6 ft 8 in (203 cm), 227 lb (103 kg), Klaipėda, Lithuania
- Shawnelle Scott, St. John's, C Jr., 6 ft 10 in (208 cm), 250 lb (113 kg), New York, N.Y.

All-Big East Third Team:

- Scott Burrell, Connecticut, G Sr., 6 ft 7 in (201 cm), 218 lb (99 kg), New Haven, Conn.
- Constantin Popa, Miami, C, So., 7 ft 3 in (221 cm), 235 lb (107 kg), Bucharest, Romania
- Jerry Walker, Seton Hall, F Sr., 6 ft 7 in (201 cm)
- Lamont Middleton, St. John's, F Sr., 6 ft 6 in (198 cm), 234 lb (106 kg), The Bronx, N.Y.
- Adrian Autry, Syracuse, G Jr., 6 ft 4 in (193 cm), 207 lb (94 kg), Monroe, N.C.

Big East All-Rookie Team:

- Othella Harrington, Georgetown, C, Fr., 6 ft 9 in (206 cm), 240 lb (109 kg), Jackson, Miss.
- Steven Edwards, Miami, F, Fr., 6 ft 5 in (196 cm), 200 lb (91 kg), Miami, Fla.
- Michael Brown, Providence, G, Fr., 6 ft 1 in (185 cm), 185 lb (84 kg), North Syracuse, N.Y.
- John Wallace, Syracuse, F, Fr., 6 ft 8 in (203 cm), 225 lb (102 kg), Rochester, N.Y.
- Kerry Kittles, Villanova, G, Fr., 6 ft 5 in (196 cm), 179 lb (81 kg), Dayton, Ohio

=== All-Americans ===
The following players were selected to the 1993 Associated Press All-America teams.

Consensus All-America Second Team:

- Terry Dehere, Seton Hall, Key Stats: 22.0 ppg, 3.0 rpg, 2.7 apg, 46.1 FG%, 39.6 3P%, 770 points

Second Team All-America:

- Terry Dehere, Seton Hall, Key Stats: 22.0 ppg, 3.0 rpg, 2.7 apg, 46.1 FG%, 39.6 3P%, 770 points

AP Honorable Mention

- Bill Curley, Boston College
- Lawrence Moten, Syracuse

== See also ==
- 1992–93 NCAA Division I men's basketball season
- 1992–93 Connecticut Huskies men's basketball team
- 1992–93 Georgetown Hoyas men's basketball team
- 1992–93 Pittsburgh Panthers men's basketball team
- 1992–93 St. John's Redmen basketball team
- 1992–93 Seton Hall Pirates men's basketball team
