= 1992–93 Seton Hall Pirates men's basketball team =

American college basketball season

1992–93 Seton Hall Pirates men's basketball

Big East tournament champions Big East Regular Season Champions

NCAA tournament, second round
- Conference: Big East Conference

Ranking
- Coaches: No. 11
- AP: No. 6
- Record: 28–7 (14–4 Big East)
- Head coach: P. J. Carlesimo (11th season)
- Home arena: Brendan Byrne Arena

1992–93 Big East men's basketball standings
	Conf.				Overall
Team	W		L	PCT	W		L	PCT
No. 6 Seton Hall †	14	–	4	.778	28	–	7	.800
St. John's	12	–	6	.667	19	–	11	.633
Syracuse	10	–	8	.556	20	–	9	.690
Connecticut	9	–	9	.500	15	–	13	.536
Providence	9	–	9	.500	20	–	13	.606
Pittsburgh	9	–	9	.500	17	–	11	.607
Boston College	9	–	9	.500	18	–	13	.581
Georgetown	8	–	10	.444	20	–	13	.606
Miami	7	–	11	.389	10	–	17	.370
Villanova	3	–	15	.167	8	–	19	.296
† 1993 Big East tournament winner As of April 5, 1993; Rankings from AP Poll

The 1992–93 Seton Hall Pirates men's basketball team represented Seton Hall University during the 1992–93 NCAA men's college basketball season. The Pirates were led by eleventh year head coach P.J. Carlesimo.

The Pirates had two wins streaks of 10+ games, won the Big East regular season and tournament championships, and received an automatic bid to the NCAA tournament as #2 seed in the Southeast region. After a one sided victory over Tennessee State, Seton Hall would be upset by Western Kentucky 72–68.

== Roster ==
1992–93 Seton Hall Pirates men's basketball team
Players
Coaches

Pos.	#	Name	Height	Weight	Year	Previous school	Hometown
G/F	4	Adrian Griffin	6 ft 5 in (1.96 m)	210 lb (95 kg)	Fr	Wichita East HS	Wichita, Kansas
G	15	Dan Hurley	6 ft 2 in (1.88 m)	—	So	St. Anthony HS	Jersey City, New Jersey
F	21	Jerry Walker	6 ft 7 in (2.01 m)	—	Sr
G	24	Terry Dehere	6 ft 2 in (1.88 m)	185 lb (84 kg)	Sr	St. Anthony HS	Jersey City, New Jersey
C	50	Luther Wright	7 ft 2 in (2.18 m)	255 lb (116 kg)	Jr	Elizabeth HS	Jersey City, New Jersey
F	55	Artūras Karnišovas	6 ft 8 in (2.03 m)	220 lb (100 kg)	Jr

Head coach

- P. J. Carlesimo

Assistant coach(es)

Legend

- (C) Team captain
- (S) Suspended
- (I) Ineligible
- (W) Walk-on
- Injured
- Current redshirt

Roster

== Schedule and results ==
Date time, TV	Rank^{#}	Opponent^{#}	Result	Record	Site (attendance) city, state
Regular season
Nov 18, 1992*	No. 6	Delaware; Preseason NIT	W 75–54	1–0	Brendan Byrne Arena; East Rutherford, New Jersey
Nov 19, 1992*	No. 6	Tennessee; Preseason NIT	W 72–64	2–0	Brendan Byrne Arena; East Rutherford, New Jersey
Nov 25, 1992*	No. 6	vs. No. 24 UCLA; Preseason NIT	W 73–64	4–0	Madison Square Garden (12,641); New York, New York
Nov 27, 1992*	No. 6	vs. No. 4 Indiana; Preseason NIT	L 74–78	4–1	Madison Square Garden; New York, New York
Dec 1, 1992*	No. 7	Rider	W 87–74	5–1	Brendan Byrne Arena; East Rutherford, New Jersey
Dec 7, 1992	No. 7	Miami (FL)	W 65–56	6–1 (1–0)	Brendan Byrne Arena; East Rutherford, New Jersey
Dec 10, 1992*	No. 7	at Iona	W 75–61	7–1	John A. Mulcahy Campus Events Center; New Rochelle, New York
Dec 14, 1992*	No. 7	Saint Peter's	W 88–54	8–1	Brendan Byrne Arena; East Rutherford, New Jersey
Dec 20, 1992*	No. 7	Fairleigh Dickinson	W 81–61	9–1	Brendan Byrne Arena; East Rutherford, New Jersey
Dec 29, 1992*	No. 7	Cornell	W 75–59	10–1	Brendan Byrne Arena; East Rutherford, New Jersey
Dec 30, 1992*	No. 7	James Madison	W 87–66	11–1	Brendan Byrne Arena; East Rutherford, New Jersey
Jan 4, 1993	No. 7	No. 19 Connecticut	W 72–69	12–1 (2–0)	Brendan Byrne Arena; East Rutherford, New Jersey
Jan 9, 1993	No. 7	at Providence	W 91–79	13–1 (3–0)	Providence Civic Center; Providence, Rhode Island
Jan 11, 1993	No. 7	No. 24 Syracuse	W 80–73	14–1 (4–0)	Brendan Byrne Arena; East Rutherford, New Jersey
Jan 16, 1993	No. 7	at Pittsburgh	L 73–76	14–2 (4–1)	Fitzgerald Field House; Pittsburgh, Pennsylvania
Jan 19, 1993	No. 10	Villanova	W 66–61	15–2 (5–1)	Brendan Byrne Arena; East Rutherford, New Jersey
Jan 24, 1993*	No. 10	No. 3 North Carolina	L 66–70	15–3	Brendan Byrne Arena; East Rutherford, New Jersey
Jan 27, 1993	No. 9	at No. 21 Georgetown	L 62–73	15–4 (5–2)	USAir Arena; Washington, D.C.
Jan 31, 1993	No. 9	at Syracuse	L 67–76	15–5 (5–3)	Carrier Dome; Syracuse, New York
Feb 2, 1993	No. 14	Providence	W 90–71	16–5 (6–3)	Brendan Byrne Arena; East Rutherford, New Jersey
Feb 6, 1993	No. 14	at Boston College	L 62–63	16–6 (6–4)	Silvio O. Conte Forum; Chestnut Hill, Massachusetts
Feb 9, 1993	No. 19	No. 17 Pittsburgh	W 91–73	17–6 (7–4)	Brendan Byrne Arena; East Rutherford, New Jersey
Feb 13, 1993	No. 19	at Villanova	W 65–59	18–6 (8–4)	The Pavilion; Philadelphia, Pennsylvania
Feb 17, 1993	No. 16	at No. 25 St. John's	W 95–85	19–6 (9–4)	Madison Square Garden; New York, New York
Feb 21, 1993	No. 16	Georgetown	W 66–56	20–6 (10–4)	Brendan Byrne Arena; East Rutherford, New Jersey
Feb 23, 1993	No. 14	at Miami (FL)	W 85–73	21–6 (11–4)	Miami Arena; Miami, Florida
Feb 27, 1993	No. 14	at Connecticut	W 82–74	22–6 (12–4)	Harry A. Gampel Pavilion; Storrs, Connecticut
Mar 3, 1993	No. 10	Boston College	W 79–61	23–6 (13–4)	Brendan Byrne Arena; East Rutherford, NJ
Mar 6, 1993	No. 10	No. 25 St. John's	W 92–73	24–6 (14–4)	Brendan Byrne Arena; East Rutherford, NJ
Big East tournament
Mar 12, 1993*	No. 9	vs. Georgetown; Big East tournament Quarterfinal	W 83–69	25–6	Madison Square Garden; New York, NY
Mar 13, 1993*	No. 9	vs. Providence; Big East tournament Semifinal	W 69–60	26–6	Madison Square Garden; New York, NY
Mar 14, 1993*	No. 9	vs. Syracuse; Big East tournament championship	W 103–70	27–6	Madison Square Garden; New York, NY
NCAA Tournament
Mar 18, 1993*	(2 SE) No. 6	vs. (15 SE) Tennessee State; First Round	W 81–59	28–6	Orlando Arena; Orlando, FL
Mar 20, 1993*	(2 SE) No. 6	vs. (7 SE) No. 20 Western Kentucky; Second Round	L 68–72	28–7	Orlando Arena; Orlando, FL
*Non-conference game. ^{#}Rankings from AP Poll. (#) Tournament seedings in parentheses. SE=Southeast.

== Awards and honors ==
- Terry Dehere – Big East Player of the Year

== Players in the 1993 NBA draft ==
Round	Pick	Player	NBA club
1	13	Terry Dehere	Los Angeles Clippers
1	18	Luther Wright	Utah Jazz
