= 1992–93 Georgetown Hoyas men's basketball team =

American college basketball season

1992–93 Georgetown Hoyas men's basketball

National Invitation Tournament, Runner-Up
- Conference: Big East Conference
- Record: 20–13 (8–10 Big East)
- Head coach: John Thompson (21st season)
- Assistant coaches: Craig Esherick (11th season); Mike Riley (11th season); Mel Reid (3rd season)
- Captain: Joey Brown
- Home arena: Capital Centre

1992–93 Big East men's basketball standings
	Conf.				Overall
Team	W		L	PCT	W		L	PCT
No. 6 Seton Hall †	14	–	4	.778	28	–	7	.800
St. John's	12	–	6	.667	19	–	11	.633
Syracuse	10	–	8	.556	20	–	9	.690
Connecticut	9	–	9	.500	15	–	13	.536
Providence	9	–	9	.500	20	–	13	.606
Pittsburgh	9	–	9	.500	17	–	11	.607
Boston College	9	–	9	.500	18	–	13	.581
Georgetown	8	–	10	.444	20	–	13	.606
Miami	7	–	11	.389	10	–	17	.370
Villanova	3	–	15	.167	8	–	19	.296
† 1993 Big East tournament winner As of April 5, 1993; Rankings from AP Poll

The 1992–93 Georgetown Hoyas men's basketball team represented Georgetown University in the 1992–93 NCAA Division I college basketball season. John Thompson, coached them in his 21st season as head coach. They played their home games at the Capital Centre in Landover, Maryland, except for two games at McDonough Gymnasium on the Georgetown campus in Washington, D.C. They were members of the Big East Conference and finished the season with a record of 20–13, 8–10 in Big East play. They advanced to the quarterfinals of the 1993 Big East men's basketball tournament before losing to Seton Hall. Not invited to the NCAA Division I men's basketball tournament for the first time since the 1977-78 season, breaking a string of 14 consecutive NCAA tournament appearances, they participated in the 1993 National Invitation Tournament (NIT) – their first NIT appearance since 1978 – and became the first team in Georgetown men's basketball history to advance to the NIT final, which they lost to Minnesota.

== Season recap ==
Freshman Othella Harrington joined the team this season, succeeding May 1992 graduate Alonzo Mourning at center and starting all 33 games. He had double figures in both scoring and rebounds in three of the first four games of the year and scored 20 or more points in five of the first eight. In the first Big East game of the year, he had 16 points, 13 rebounds, and five blocked shots against Pittsburgh, and in the second conference game he scored 27 points, grabbed 13 rebounds, and blocked five shots at Miami. At the end of the season, he had scored in double figures in 30 games and had double figures in rebounds in 14 games. He combined with his taller teammate, fellow freshman center Duane Spencer, to average 25.5 points and 15.9 rebounds per game for the year.

Junior forward Robert Churchwell also started all 33 games. He led the team in scoring in six games and finished the year as its second-highest scorer and third in rebounds. He had a career-high 25 points against Connecticut and a 16-point, 11-rebound game against Miami.

Junior point guard and team captain Joey Brown missed only one game all season and started the other 32, scoring in double figures 20 times and leading the team in scoring three times. He tied the school single-season steal record set by guard Fred Brown in the 1980-81 season with 80 steals, and he had 199 assists, the fourth most in a single season in Georgetown history. In his best game of the year, he had 17 points, nine rebounds, nine assists, and four steals against Connecticut.

As the Big East season progressed, the lack of a reliable shooting guard hurt Georgetown. Four different underclassmen started at the position, and, with poor shooting from the field by guards John Jacques (36.2% in Big East play), Eric Micoud (34.3%), and Irvin Church (17.9%) plaguing the Hoyas, they lost eight of their last eleven conference games to finish the Big East regular season with an 8-10 record, good for only an eighth-place finish. In the Big East tournament, they defeated Miami in the first round but lost to ninth-ranked Seton Hall in the quarterfinal. Their 16-12 overall record at the end of the tournament, combined with their losing regular-season conference record and a weak non-conference schedule that included three non-Division I opponents, prevented them from receiving an invitation to the 1993 NCAA tournament, breaking a 14-season streak of NCAA Tournament appearances for Georgetown dating back to the 1978-79 season.

Georgetown instead received an invitation to the 1993 National Invitation Tournament (NIT) and made its first NIT appearance since the 1977-78 season. Harrington led the way, beginning the tournament by scoring 25 points and collecting 18 rebounds in a first-round win at Arizona State. In the second round, Georgetown met favored Texas-El Paso at McDonough Gymnasium on the Georgetown campus (held there because NIT rules at the time required host teams to play tournament games on campus) and held the Miners to 15% shooting from the field in the first half and 25% for the game behind a strong defensive effort by Joey Brown, whose 16 points, five rebounds, three assists, and three steals led the team. The Hoyas then defeated Miami of Ohio in the quarterfinals. Harrington had 20 rebounds in the Texas-El Paso and Miami of Ohio games.

In the semifinals, the Hoyas met Alabama-Birmingham in a tough game dominated by defense. With 13:48 to play in the game, Alabama-Birmingham held a 38-22 lead, but the Hoya defense clamped down after that, held the Blazers to three points in the next four minutes and no points in the final 9:24. Harrington had 11 points and five rebounds and Churchwell shot 6-for-7 (85.7%) from the field and scored 15 points as the Hoyas came from behind to win 45–41.

Georgetown thus advanced to the NIT final for the first time in school history, facing Minnesota in the championship game, in which Harrington scored 17 points. With 4:27 left to play and Minnesota leading 62–53, the Hoyas made another defensive stand that prevented the Golden Gophers from scoring for the rest of the game, and Georgetown cut Minnesota's lead to 62–61. On the last play of the game, Georgetown sophomore forward Kevin Millen, having no reliable shooting guard to get the ball to, took a long shot from outside himself. It missed. The game ended with the Golden Gophers deflecting a late pass to Harrington, preventing him from attempting a final shot for the win, and Minnesota won 62–61. Although the Hoyas did not win the tournament championship, as tournament runners-up they had the best NIT finish in school history.

== Roster ==
#	Name	Height	Weight (lbs.)	Position	Class	Hometown	Previous Team(s)
4	John Jacques	6'3"	175	F	So.	Delco, NC, U.S.	Acme-Delco HS
10	Joey Brown	5'10"	185	G	Jr.	Morgan City, LA, U.S.	Morgan City HS
11	Irvin Church	6'1"	185	G	So.	Riverdale, MD, U.S.	Parkdale HS
12	Éric Micoud	6'1"	185	G	Fr.	Lyon, France	St. John's HS (D.C.)
21	Lonnie Harrell	6'6"	180	G/F	So.	Washington, DC, U.S.	Eastern HS
22	Robert Churchwell	6'6"	210	F	Jr.	South Bend, IN, U.S.	Gonzaga College HS (D.C.)
24	Vladimir Bosanac	6'9"	190	F	Jr.	Belgrade, Yugoslavia	Second Economic School
32	Kevin Millen	6'6"	185	F	So.	Memphis, TN, U.S.	Raleigh-Egypt HS
34	Lamont Morgan	6'2"	185	G	So.	Washington, DC, U.S.	Gonzaga College HS
40	Duane Spencer	6'10"	205	F/C	Fr.	New Orleans, LA, U.S.	Walter L. Cohen HS
43	Derrick Patterson	6'6"	200	F	So.	Chicago, IL, U.S.	Dunbar Vocational HS
50	Othella Harrington	6'9"	240	C	Fr.	Jackson, MS, U.S.	Murrah HS
52	Don Reid	6'8"	270	F	So.	Largo, MD, U.S.	Largo HS

== Rankings ==
Ranking movement Legend: ██ Improvement in ranking. ██ Decrease in ranking. ██ Not ranked the previous week. RV=Others receiving votes.
Poll	Pre	Wk 1	Wk 2	Wk 3	Wk 4	Wk 5	Wk 6	Wk 7	Wk 8	Wk 9	Wk 10	Wk 11	Wk 12	Wk 13	Wk 14	Wk 15	Wk 16	Final
AP	12	13	14	11	11	11	10	17	20	18	21	23						
Coaches (Note: Sources do not provide Coaches' Poll rankings during the season, but confirm that Georgetown was not ranked in the Top 25 in the final poll.)	N/A	N/A	N/A	N/A	N/A	N/A	N/A	N/A	N/A	N/A	N/A	N/A	N/A	N/A	N/A	N/A	N/A	

== 1992–93 Schedule and results ==
Sources

- All times are Eastern

Date time, TV	Rank^{#}	Opponent^{#}	Result	Record	Site (attendance) city, state
Preseason
Sat., Nov. 28, 1992		Fort Hood (U.S. Army All−Star Team)	W 112−100	exhibition	McDonough Gymnasium (N/A); Washington, DC
Regular Season
Thu., Dec. 3, 1992*	No. 14	Saint Leo	W 88−41	1–0	Capital Centre (N/A); Landover, MD
Sat., Dec. 5, 1992*	No. 14	Southern-New Orleans	W 96−57	2–0	Capital Centre (5,078); Landover, MD
Wed., Dec. 9, 1992	No. 11	Pittsburgh	W 80−66	3–0 (1–0)	Capital Centre (10,173); Landover, MD
Sat., Dec. 12, 1992*	No. 11	Maryland Eastern Shore	W 87−64	4–0	McDonough Gymnasium (2,276); Washington, DC
Sat., Dec. 19, 1992*	No. 11	Morgan State	W 103−85	5–0	Capital Centre (9,752); Landover, MD
Mon., Dec. 28, 1992*	No. 10	vs. Hawaii Pacific; UCI Classic	W 78–65	6–0	Donald Bren Events Center (3,218); Irvine, CA
Wed., Dec. 30, 1992*	No. 10	at California-Irvine; UCI Classic	W 64–60	7–0	Donald Bren Events Center (5,022); Irvine, CA
Sat., Jan. 2, 1993	No. 10	at Miami	L 69–80	7–1 (1–1)	Miami Arena (4,497); Miami, FL
Tue., Jan. 5, 1993; 8:00 p.m.	No. 17	No. 21 Syracuse; Rivalry	W 64−60	8–1 (2–1)	Capital Centre (12,185); Landover, MD
Sat., Jan. 9, 1993	No. 17	Boston College	L 56–57	8–2 (2–2)	Capital Centre (11,223); Landover, MD
Wed., Jan. 13, 1993*	No. 20	DePaul	W 74−45	9–2	Capital Centre (N/A); Landover, MD
Sat., Jan. 16, 1993	No. 20	at Villanova	W 66−56	10–2 (3–2)	Spectrum (11,217); Philadelphia, PA
Mon., Jan. 18, 1993	No. 18	at No. 17 Connecticut; Rivalry	W 86–69	11–2 (4–2)	Hartford Civic Center (16,294); Hartford, CT
Sat., Jan. 23, 1993*	No. 18	at No. 15 Nevada-Las Vegas	L 80–96	11–3	Thomas & Mack Center (N/A); Las Vegas, NV
Wed., Jan. 27, 1993	No. 21	No. 9 Seton Hall	W 73–62	12–3 (5–2)	Capital Centre (13,528); Landover, MD
Sat., Jan. 30, 1993	No. 21	at Boston College	L 61–71	12–4 (5–3)	Silvio O. Conte Forum (8,606); Chestnut Hill, MA
Mon., Feb. 1, 1993	No. 23	at St. John's	L 61–79	12–5 (5–4)	Madison Square Garden (11,690); New York, NY
Sat., Feb. 6, 1993	No. 23	Providence	L 58–66 ^{OT}	12–6 (5–5)	Capital Centre (13,423); Landover, MD
Mon., Feb. 8, 1993; 7:30 p.m.		at Syracuse; Rivalry	L 61–76	12−7 (5–6)	Carrier Dome (28,861); Syracuse, NY
Sat., Feb. 13, 1993		at Providence	L 50–68	12−8 (5–7)	Providence Civic Center (13,106); Providence, RI
Wed., Feb. 17, 1993		Villanova	W 61–52	13–8 (6–7)	Capital Centre (9,182); Landover, MD
Sun., Feb. 21, 1993		at No. 16 Seton Hall	L 56–66	13–9 (6–8)	Brendan Byrne Arena (20,029); East Rutherford, NJ
Tue., Feb. 23, 1993		St. John's	L 56–61	13–10 (6–9)	Capital Centre (8,672); Landover, MD
Sun., Feb. 28, 1993		at Pittsburgh	L 48–51	13–11 (6–10)	Civic Arena (15,154); Pittsburgh, PA
Wed., Mar. 3, 1993		Miami	W 82–64	14–11 (7–10)	Capital Centre (9,051); Landover, MD
Sun., Mar. 7, 1993		Connecticut; Rivalry	W 70–56	15–11 (8–10)	Capital Centre (9,528); Landover, MD
Big East tournament
Thu., Mar. 11, 1993		vs. Miami; First Round	W 67–40	16–11	Madison Square Garden (18,992); New York, NY
Fri., Mar. 12, 1993		vs. No. 9 Seton Hall; Quarterfinal	L 69–83	16–12	Madison Square Garden (19,522); New York, NY
National Invitation Tournament
Thu., Mar. 18, 1993		at Arizona State; First Round	W 78–68	17–12	Arizona State University Activity Center (8,777); Tempe, AZ
Tue., Mar. 23, 1993		Texas-El Paso; Second Round	W 71–44	18–12	McDonough Gymnasium (2,249); Washington, DC
Thu., Mar. 25, 1993		vs. Miami (OH); Third Round	W 66–53	19–12	Patriot Center (2,929); Fairfax, VA
Mon., Mar. 29, 1993		vs. Alabama-Birmingham; Semifinal	W 45–41	20–12	Madison Square Garden (9,065); New York, NY
Wed., Mar. 31, 1993		vs. Minnesota; Final	L 61–62	20–13	Madison Square Garden (11,071); New York, NY
*Non-conference game. ^{#}Rankings from AP Poll. (#) Tournament seedings in parentheses.
