= Big East Coach of the Year =

Big East Coach of the Year may refer to:

- Big East Football Coach of the Year
- Big East Men's Basketball Coach of the Year
