= 1992–93 Connecticut Huskies men's basketball team =

American college basketball season

1992–93 Connecticut Huskies men's basketball

NIT, First Round
- Conference: Big East Conference
- Record: 15–13 (9–9 Big East)
- Head coach: Jim Calhoun (7th season)
- Assistant coaches: Howie Dickenman; Dave Leitao; Glen Miller
- Home arena: Hartford Civic Center; Harry A. Gampel Pavilion

1992–93 Big East men's basketball standings
	Conf.				Overall
Team	W		L	PCT	W		L	PCT
No. 6 Seton Hall †	14	–	4	.778	28	–	7	.800
St. John's	12	–	6	.667	19	–	11	.633
Syracuse	10	–	8	.556	20	–	9	.690
Connecticut	9	–	9	.500	15	–	13	.536
Providence	9	–	9	.500	20	–	13	.606
Pittsburgh	9	–	9	.500	17	–	11	.607
Boston College	9	–	9	.500	18	–	13	.581
Georgetown	8	–	10	.444	20	–	13	.606
Miami	7	–	11	.389	10	–	17	.370
Villanova	3	–	15	.167	8	–	19	.296
† 1993 Big East tournament winner As of April 5, 1993; Rankings from AP Poll

The 1992–93 Connecticut Huskies men's basketball team represented the University of Connecticut in the 1992–93 collegiate men's basketball season. The Huskies completed the season with a 15–13 overall record. The Huskies were members of the Big East Conference where they finished with a 9–9 record. UConn lost in the First Round of the 1993 National Invitation Tournament to Jackson State 90–88 in overtime.

The Huskies played their home games at Harry A. Gampel Pavilion in Storrs, Connecticut and the Hartford Civic Center in Hartford, Connecticut, and they were led by seventh-year head coach Jim Calhoun.

== Schedule ==
Date time, TV	Rank^{#}	Opponent^{#}	Result	Record	Site (attendance) city, state
Regular Season
11/28/1992*; ESPN	No. 16	vs. No. 24 Purdue; Hall of Fame Tip-Off Classic	L 69–73	0–1	Springfield Civic Center (8,999); Springfield, Massachusetts
12/5/1992*; ESPN	No. 25	at NC State	W 81–74	1–1	Reynolds Coliseum (9,100); Raleigh, North Carolina
12/8/1992; WTNH		St. John's	W 74–72 ^{OT}	2–1 (1–0)	Harry A. Gampel Pavilion (8,241); Storrs, Connecticut
12/10/1992*		Yale	W 65–38	3–1	Hartford Civic Center (14,567); Hartford, Connecticut
12/22/1992*	No. 22	Fairfield	W 90–66	4–1	Hartford Civic Center (15,820); Hartford, Connecticut
12/28/1992*	No. 23	Hartford; Connecticut Mutual Classic	W 91–66	5–1	Hartford Civic Center (16,040); Hartford, Connecticut
12/29/1992*	No. 23	Towson; Connecticut Mutual Classic	W 96–66	6–1	Hartford Civic Center (15,564); Hartford, Connecticut
1/4/1993; ESPN	No. 19	at No. 7 Seton Hall	L 69–72	6–2 (1–1)	Brendan Byrne Arena (14,965); East Rutherford, New Jersey
1/9/1993; WTNH	No. 19	at Villanova	W 87–80	7–2 (2–1)	The Pavilion (6,500); Villanova, Pennsylvania
1/12/1993; WTNH	No. 15	Pittsburgh	L 78–80	7–3 (2–2)	Hartford Civic Center (16,294); Hartford, Connecticut
1/16/1993; WTNH	No. 15	at Boston College	W 66–64	8–3 (3–2)	Conte Forum (8,606); Boston
1/18/1993; ESPN	No. 17	No. 18 Georgetown; Rivalry	L 69–86	8–4 (3–3)	Hartford Civic Center (16,294); Hartford, Connecticut
1/23/1993; WTNH	No. 17	Providence	W 68–61	9–4 (4–3)	Harry A. Gampel Pavilion (8,241); Storrs, Connecticut
1/26/1993; WTNH	No. 22	at Miami	L 65–80	9–5 (4–4)	Miami Arena (4,058); Miami, Florida
1/30/1993; WTNH	No. 22	at St. John's	L 59–72	9–6 (4–5)	Madison Square Garden (18,935); New York City
2/2/1993; WTNH		Syracuse; Rivalry	L 57–60	9–7 (4–6)	Hartford Civic Center (16,294); Hartford, Connecticut
2/6/1993*; CBS		No. 12 Florida State	L 74–86	9–8	Harry A. Gampel Pavilion (8,241); Storrs, Connecticut
2/9/1993; WTNH		Villanova	W 82–62	10–8 (5–6)	Harry A. Gampel Pavilion (8,241); Storrs, Connecticut
2/13/1993; WTNH		Miami	W 88–72	11–8 (6–6)	Harry A. Gampel Pavilion (8,241); Storrs, Connecticut
2/15/1993; ESPN		at Syracuse; Rivalry	W 80–76	12–8 (7–6)	Carrier Dome (26,980); Syracuse, New York
2/20/1993; WTNH		at No. 17 Pittsburgh	W 81–80	13–8 (8–6)	Civic Arena (6,798); Pittsburgh
2/22/1993*; ESPN		Maine	W 108–72	14–8	Hartford Civic Center (15,115); Hartford, Connecticut
2/24/1993; CBS		Boston College	W 69–64	15–8 (9–6)	Harry A. Gampel Pavilion (8,241); Storrs, Connecticut
2/27/1993		No. 14 Seton Hall	L 74–82	15–9 (9–7)	Hartford Civic Center (16,294); Hartford, Connecticut
3/2/1993; WTNH		at Providence	L 71–74	15–10 (9–8)	Providence Civic Center (13,106); Providence, Rhode Island
3/7/1993; CBS		at Georgetown; Rivalry	L 56–70	15–11 (9–9)	Capital Centre (9,528); Landover, Maryland
Big East tournament
3/12/1993; WTNH		vs. Providence; Quarterfinals	L 55–73	15–12	Madison Square Garden (19,522); New York
NIT
3/19/1993*		Jackson State; First Round	L 88–90 ^{OT}	15–13	Harry A. Gampel Pavilion (8,241); Storrs, Connecticut
*Non-conference game. ^{#}Rankings from AP Poll. (#) Tournament seedings in parentheses. All times are in Eastern Time.

Schedule Source:
