= Shaheen Holloway =

American basketball player and coach (born 1976)

- Holloway (left) with the ABA's Jersey Express in 2006

Seton Hall Pirates
- Title: Head coach
- League: Big East

Personal information
- Born: October 7, 1976 (age 50) Queens, New York, U.S.
- Listed height: 5 ft 10 in (1.78 m)
- Listed weight: 173 lb (78 kg)

Career information
- High school: St. Patrick (Elizabeth, New Jersey)
- College: Seton Hall (1996–2000)
- NBA draft: 2000: undrafted
- Playing career: 2000–2007
- Position: Point guard
- Number: 10
- Coaching career: 2007–present

Career history

Playing
- 2000–2001: Hapoel Holon
- 2001–2002: Chicago Skyliners
- 2002–2003: Chester Jets
- 2003: London Towers
- 2003–2004: İstanbul Teknik Üniversitesi
- 2004–2005: Ratiopharm Ulm
- 2005: Marineros de Puerto Plata
- 2005–2006: Jersey Express
- 2006–2007: Pennsylvania ValleyDawgs

Coaching
- 2007–2010: Iona (assistant)
- 2010–2018: Seton Hall (assistant)
- 2018–2022: Saint Peter's
- 2022–present: Seton Hall

Career highlights
- As player: 2× Second-team All-Big East (1997, 2000); Third-team All-Big East (1998); Big East Most Improved Player (2000); Big East All-Rookie Team (1997); 2× Second-team Parade All-American (1995, 1996); McDonald's All-American Game MVP (1996); As coach: NIT champion (2024); MAAC Tournament champion (2022); MAAC Coach of the Year (2020); Big East Coach of the Year (2026)

Shaheen Holloway (born October 7, 1976) is an American men's basketball coach and former player who is the coach for the Seton Hall Pirates. He played college basketball at Seton Hall from 1996 to 2000. A point guard, Holloway played professionally for seven seasons. He served as the head coach for the Saint Peter's Peacocks from 2018 to 2022, where he led the 15th seed Peacocks to the Elite Eight in the 2022 NCAA Division I Men's Basketball Tournament. As head coach of Seton Hall, he led the top-seeded Pirates to the 2024 National Invitation Tournament (NIT) championship.

== High school ==
Holloway was considered one of the top point guard prospects in his high school class playing for St. Patrick, with some of the scouting reports naming him as the best point guard in the nation. He and Mike Bibby were consistently named as the two best point guards of the 1996 class. Selected 3 times in the All-State selection, in 1995 he was amongst the top scorers of the Reebok Big Time Tournament with an average of 26.3 points per game, and he was selected to the Parade All-America Second Team. He averaged 22.5 points, 9.1 assists and 5.8 steals as a senior, for a total of 2,151 points, 727 assists and 540 steals during his time at St. Patrick, and was named to the Parade All-America second team (for the second year in a row) and was also named a McDonald's All-American. In the McDonald's All-American Game of 1996 Holloway was the starting point guard for the East team: he recorded 7 points, 8 assists and 6 steals, receiving the Most Valuable Player award over Kobe Bryant.

== College career ==
After considering offers from California, Duke, and Georgia Tech, Holloway accepted the scholarship offered by Seton Hall. Duke coach Mike Krzyzewski later told Holloway that he was the only recruit to not commit to Duke after twice visiting the school.

During his freshman year, Holloway posting averages of 17.3 points and 6.3 assists per game and was 5th in the Big East conference in scoring. He was selected for the Big East All-Rookie team and for the All-AAC second team. Despite his solid season, he decided not to declare for an early entry in the NBA draft. His second season was slightly worse than his rookie season and, despite leading the Big East in assists per game (6.5), he had worse averages in all the other major statistical categories. His junior season was his worst of his college career and all his statistics declined. This was the only season in which he averaged a single digit in points per game (9.3).

His senior season was his best and he was one of the main players on the Seton Hall team that reached the 2000 NCAA tournament Sweet Sixteen. He focused more on his 3-point shooting, improving his percentage to 40.3%, and was named the Big East Most Improved Player in 2000. In 978 total minutes played, he was Seton Hall's top player in assists per game, and he was second in scoring and rebounding (the top rebounder was future NBA center Samuel Dalembert). In the 2000 NCAA Tournament, he scored 27 points, including the winning basket with 1.9 seconds left in overtime, in the Pirates 72–71 first-round victory over seventh-seeded Oregon. In the next game against second-seeded Temple, Holloway suffered an ankle injury on a successful fastbreak drive for a layup, ending his season.

He finished his college career with 1,588 points and he became the all-time assist leader, with 681 assists, a record that he still holds as of 2018. He played a total of 3,865 minutes with the Pirates. In 2012 he was inducted into the Seton Hall Athletics Hall of Fame.

=== College statistics ===
| Year | Team | GP | GS | MPG | FG% | 3P% | FT% | RPG | APG | SPG | BPG | PPG |
|---|---|---|---|---|---|---|---|---|---|---|---|---|
| 1996–97 | Seton Hall | 28 | 28 | 37.4 | .364 | .341 | .544 | 3.8 | 6.3 | 2.8 | 0.4 | 17.3 |
| 1997–98 | Seton Hall | 29 | 28 | 36.7 | .344 | .242 | .629 | 3.8 | 6.5 | 2.1 | 0.2 | 15.0 |
| 1998–99 | Seton Hall | 28 | 22 | 27.7 | .358 | .221 | .675 | 2.8 | 5.0 | 1.5 | 0.1 | 9.3 |
| 1999–00 | Seton Hall | 31 | 31 | 31.5 | .447 | .403 | .780 | 5.1 | 5.6 | 1.7 | 0.0 | 13.2 |
| Career | | 116 | 109 | 33.3 | .374 | .305 | .640 | 3.9 | 5.9 | 2.0 | 0.2 | 13.7 |

== Professional career ==
After his senior season Holloway became automatically eligible for the 2000 NBA draft, but he was not drafted by any of the NBA teams. He was invited to the 2000 Summer League by the New York Knicks and the Washington Wizards. He was drafted in the seventh round of the 2000 USBL Draft by the Long Island Surf (67th overall pick). He played professionally for Israeli team Hapoel Holon in 2000–01, averaging 15.5 points and 4 assists in 4 games played. In 2001–02 he played for the Chicago Skyliners. For the 2002–03 season he signed with the Chester Jets, and he also played for the London Towers. In 2003 he transferred to Turkey, and signed with İstanbul Teknik Üniversitesi: there he averaged 12.2 points, 2.6 rebounds and 4.4 assists in 19 games played. He also played for Ratiopharm Ulm in Germany in 2004–05. In 2005 he returned in the United States, and signed with the Jersey Express. He also played for Marineros de Puerto Plata in the Dominican Republic, where he ranked second in the Liga Nacional de Baloncesto in assists per game (4.4 in 15 games). His last team was the Pennsylvania ValleyDawgs for the 2006–07 season.

== Coaching career ==
Instead of continuing his playing career in Germany, Holloway returned to New Jersey and took a position as a substitute teacher and assistant coach at Bloomfield Tech High School. He then joined the Seton Hall staff as an administrative assistant to the coach, Bobby Gonzalez. His high school coach, Kevin Boyle, recommended him to Kevin Willard, who had taken over as head coach at Iona College in 2007. Just months after moving to Iona, Gonzalez had an opening for an assistant coach and asked Holloway to return to the Pirates. Though he was tempted to return to his alma mater, he stayed at Iona. When Willard became Seton Hall head coach in 2010, Holloway followed him as one of his assistant coaches.

On April 10, 2018, Holloway was hired by Saint Peter's University as their new head coach. On March 17, 2022, Holloway led his team to an upset overtime victory in the NCAA tournament over the second seeded Kentucky Wildcats. Two days later, on March 19, 2022, Holloway advanced Saint Peter's to the Sweet Sixteen for the first time in school history, with a 70–60 win over the seventh seeded Murray State Racers, ending its 21-game winning streak. With the win, his team became just the third No. 15 seed in tournament history to advance to the second weekend of the tournament. On March 25, 2022, he coached Saint Peter's University to a victory over third seeded Purdue 67–64. This made Saint Peter’s the first No. 15 seed to advance to the Elite 8 in NCAA tournament history, where their Cinderella run ended with a 69-49 loss to No. 8 seed North Carolina.

On March 30, 2022, Holloway was hired by Seton Hall as their new head coach, replacing Willard, who had taken the job as head coach at the University of Maryland.

On April 4, 2024, Holloway's Pirates won the National Invitation Tournament, beating Indiana State 79-77 at Hinkle Fieldhouse.

== Personal life ==
Holloway and his wife, Kim, who graduated from Seton Hall in 2001, have two sons, Xavier and Tyson. He also became a father at age 16 and his daughter, Shatanik, is a 2018 graduate of Seton Hall.

== Head coaching record ==
Record table
| Season | Team | Overall | Conference | Standing | Postseason |
|---|---|---|---|---|---|
Saint Peter's Peacocks (Metro Atlantic Athletic Conference) (2018–2022)
| 2018–19 | Saint Peter's | 10–22 | 6–12 | T–9th | |
| 2019–20 | Saint Peter's | 18–12 | 14–6 | 2nd | |
| 2020–21 | Saint Peter's | 14–11 | 10–8 | T–3rd | |
| 2021–22 | Saint Peter's | 22–12 | 14–6 | 2nd | NCAA Division I Elite Eight |
| Saint Peter's: | | 64–57 (.529) | 44–32 (.579) | | |
Seton Hall Pirates (Big East Conference) (2022–present)
| 2022–23 | Seton Hall | 17–16 | 10–10 | T–6th | NIT First Round |
| 2023–24 | Seton Hall | 25–12 | 13–7 | 4th | NIT Champions |
| 2024–25 | Seton Hall | 7–25 | 2–18 | 11th | |
| 2025–26 | Seton Hall | 21–12 | 10–10 | 4th | |
| 2026–27 | Seton Hall | 5–1 | 0–0 | | |
| Seton Hall: | | 75–66 (.532) | 35–45 (.438) | | |
| Total: | | 139–123 (.531) | | | |
National champion Postseason invitational champion Conference regular season champion Conference regular season and conference tournament champion Division regular season champion Division regular season and conference tournament champion Conference tournament champion

== Bibliography ==
- Fitzsimmons, Brian (2011). Celtic Pride: How Coach Kevin Boyle Took St. Patrick to the Top of High School Basketball. iUniverse. ISBN 9781462063680.
