= 1992–93 St. John's Redmen basketball team =

American college basketball season

1992–1993 St. John's Redmen men's basketball

Lapchick Memorial Champions

NCAA men's Division I tournament, second round
- Conference: Big East Conference
- Record: 19–11 (12–6 Big East)
- Head coach: Brian Mahoney (1st year)
- Assistant coaches: Al LoBalbo; Ron Rutledge; George Felton
- Home arena: Alumni Hall; Madison Square Garden

1992–93 Big East men's basketball standings
	Conf.				Overall
Team	W		L	PCT	W		L	PCT
No. 6 Seton Hall †	14	–	4	.778	28	–	7	.800
St. John's	12	–	6	.667	19	–	11	.633
Syracuse	10	–	8	.556	20	–	9	.690
Connecticut	9	–	9	.500	15	–	13	.536
Providence	9	–	9	.500	20	–	13	.606
Pittsburgh	9	–	9	.500	17	–	11	.607
Boston College	9	–	9	.500	18	–	13	.581
Georgetown	8	–	10	.444	20	–	13	.606
Miami	7	–	11	.389	10	–	17	.370
Villanova	3	–	15	.167	8	–	19	.296
† 1993 Big East tournament winner As of April 5, 1993; Rankings from AP Poll

The 1992–93 St. John's Redmen basketball team represented St. John's University during the 1992–93 NCAA Division- basketball season. The team was coached by Brian Mahoney in his first year at the school after replacing long time head coach Lou Carnesecca. St. John's home games are played at Alumni Hall and Madison Square Garden and the team is a member of the Big East Conference.

== Off season ==
=== Departures ===
Name	Number	Pos.	Height	Weight	Year	Hometown	Notes
Jason Buchanan	13	G	6'2"		Senior		Graduated
Chucky Sproling		G	6'6"		Senior		Graduated
Terence Mullin		G			Senior		Graduated
Malik Sealy	21	F	6'8"		Senior		Graduated. Entered 1992 NBA draft
Robert Werdann	41	C	6'11"		Senior		Graduated. Entered 1992 NBA draft

=== Class of 1992 signees ===
College recruiting information
Name	Hometown	School	Height	Weight	Commit date
Rowan Barrett; SF	Scarborough, Ontario	West Hill Collegiate Institute	6 ft 5 in (1.96 m)	N/A	
Rowan Barrett; SF	Recruit ratings: No ratings found				
Charles Minlend; PF	Cameroon, Africa	St. Thomas More School	6 ft 5 in (1.96 m)	N/A	
Charles Minlend; PF	Recruit ratings: No ratings found				
Fred Lyson; PF	Oceanside, NY	Oceanside High School	6 ft 5 in (1.96 m)	N/A	
Fred Lyson; PF	Recruit ratings: No ratings found				
Maurice Brown; PG	Brooklyn, NY	William E. Grady High School	5 ft 9 in (1.75 m)	N/A	
Maurice Brown; PG	Recruit ratings: No ratings found				
Thomas Bayne; PF	Brentwood, NY	Brentwood High School	7 ft 0 in (2.13 m)	N/A	
Thomas Bayne; PF	Recruit ratings: No ratings found				
Overall recruit ranking:
Note: In many cases, Scout, Rivals, 247Sports, On3, and ESPN may conflict in their listings of height and weight.; In these cases, the average was taken. ESPN grades are on a 100-point scale.; Sources: "1992 Team Ranking". Rivals.

== Roster ==
1992–93 St. John's Red Storm men's basketball team
Players
Coaches

Pos.	#	Name	Height	Weight	Year	Previous school	Hometown
F	3	Sergio Luyk	6 ft 7 in (2.01 m)	—	RS So	University Heights (KY)	Madrid, Spain
G	5	Maurice Brown	5 ft 9 in (1.75 m)	—	Fr	William E. Grady	Brooklyn, NY
G	11	David Cain	6 ft 0 in (1.83 m)	—	Sr	Adlai E. Stevenson	Bronx, NY
G	13	Lee Green	6 ft 2 in (1.88 m)	—	Jr	Cheshire (CT)	Bronx, NY
F	15	Mitchell Foster	6 ft 9 in (2.06 m)	—	Sr	Arizona Western	Newark, NJ
F	22	Thomas Bayne	7 ft 0 in (2.13 m)	—	Fr	Brentwood	Brentwood, NY
G	23	Derek Brown	6 ft 3 in (1.91 m)	—	So	H. Frank Carey	Franklin Square, NY
G/F	24	Rowan Barrett	6 ft 5 in (1.96 m)	—	Fr	West Hill	Scarborough, Ontario
G	30	Carl Beckett	6 ft 4 in (1.93 m)	—	RS Jr	Christ the King	Queens, NY
F	31	Lamont Middleton	6 ft 6 in (1.98 m)	—	RS Sr	Walton/Hartford	Bronx, NY
F	34	Charles Minlend	6 ft 5 in (1.96 m)	—	Fr	St. Thomas More (CT)	Yaoundé, Cameroon
C	42	Shawnelle Scott	6 ft 11 in (2.11 m)	—	Jr	All Hallows	New York, NY
G/F	44	Fred Lyson	6 ft 5 in (1.96 m)	—	Fr	Oceanside	Oceanside, NY
G	45	Ron DeQueiroz	6 ft 4 in (1.93 m)	—	Jr	Xaverian	Rio de Janeiro, Brazil

Head coach

- Brian Mahoney (Manhattan)

Assistant coach(es)

- Al LoBalbo
- Ron Rutledge
- George Felton

Legend

- (C) Team captain
- (S) Suspended
- (I) Ineligible
- (W) Walk-on
- Injured
- Current redshirt

== Schedule and results ==
Date time, TV	Rank^{#}	Opponent^{#}	Result	Record	Site city, state
Regular season
12/01/92*		St. Francis (NY); Lapchick Tournament Opening Round	W 101-68	1-0	Alumni Hall; Queens, NY
12/02/92*		Iona; Lapchick Tournament Championship	W 90-74	2-0	Alumni Hall; Queens, NY
12/05/92*		vs. Niagara	W 75-71	3-0	Buffalo Memorial Auditorium; Buffalo, NY
12/08/92		at Connecticut	L 72-74 ^{OT}	3-1 (0-1)	Gampel Pavilion; Storrs, CT
12/10/92*		at Fordham	L 55-60	3-2	Rose Hill Gymnasium; Bronx, NY
12/19/92*		Hofstra	W 58-56	4-2	Alumni Hall; Queens, NY
12/23/92*		at No. 4 Indiana	L 80-105	4-3	Assembly Hall; Bloomington, IN
12/28/92*		Manhattan; ECAC Holiday Festival Semifinal	W 74-59	5-3	Madison Square Garden; New York, NY
12/30/92*		No. 3 Kentucky; ECAC Holiday Festival Championship	L 77-86	5-4	Madison Square Garden; New York, NY
01/05/93		Providence	W 86-76	6-4 (1-1)	Alumni Hall; Queens, NY
01/09/93		No. 24 Pittsburgh	W 85-77	7-4 (2-1)	Alumni Hall; Queens, NY
01/13/93		at Villanova	W 76-70	8-4 (3-1)	duPont Pavilion; Villanova, PA
01/16/93		Miami (F.L.)	W 78-74	9-4 (4-1)	Alumni Hall; Queens, NY
01/23/93		at Syracuse	W 78-71	10-4 (5-1)	Carrier Dome; Syracuse, NY
01/26/93		at Boston College	L 61-71	10-5 (5-2)	Silvio O. Conte Forum; Chestnut Hill, MA
01/30/93		No. 22 Connecticut	W 72-59	11-5 (6-2)	Madison Square Garden; New York, NY
02/01/93		No. 23 Georgetown	W 79-61	12-5 (7-2)	Madison Square Garden; New York, NY
02/06/93		at No. 15 Pittsburgh	L 69-71	12-6 (7-3)	Fitzgerald Field House; Pittsburgh, PA
02/09/93		at Providence	W 73-64	13-6 (8-3)	Providence Civic Center; Providence, RI
02/13/93		No. 21 Boston College	W 65-61	14-6 (9-3)	Alumni Hall; Queens, NY
02/17/93	No. 25	No. 16 Seton Hall	L 85-95 ^{OT}	14-7 (9-4)	Madison Square Garden; New York, NY
02/21/93	No. 25	at Miami (F.L.)	L 77-82	14-8 (9-5)	Miami Arena; Miami, FL
02/23/93		at Georgetown	W 61-56	15-8 (10-5)	Capital Centre; Landover, MD
02/27/93		Villanova	W 65-62	16-8 (11-5)	Madison Square Garden; New York, NY
02/01/93	No. 25	Syracuse	W 90-70	17-8 (12-5)	Madison Square Garden; New York, NY
03/06/93	No. 25	at No. 10 Seton Hall	L 73-92	17-9 (12-6)	Meadowlands Arena; East Rutherford, NJ
Big East tournament
03/12/93		vs. Boston College; Big East tournament quarterfinal	W 76-56	18-9 (12-6)	Madison Square Garden; New York, NY
03/13/93		vs. Syracuse; Big East tournament semifinal	L 72-84	18-10 (12-6)	Madison Square Garden; New York, NY
NCAA tournament
03/18/93*		vs. (12) Texas Tech; NCAA First Round	W 85-67	19-10	Lawrence Joel Arena; Winston-Salem, NC
03/20/93*		vs. (4) Arkansas; NCAA Second Round	L 74-80	19-11	Lawrence Joel Arena; Winston-Salem, NC
*Non-conference game. ^{#}Rankings from AP Poll. (#) Tournament seedings in parentheses.
