= Desi Rodriguez =

American basketball player (born 1996)

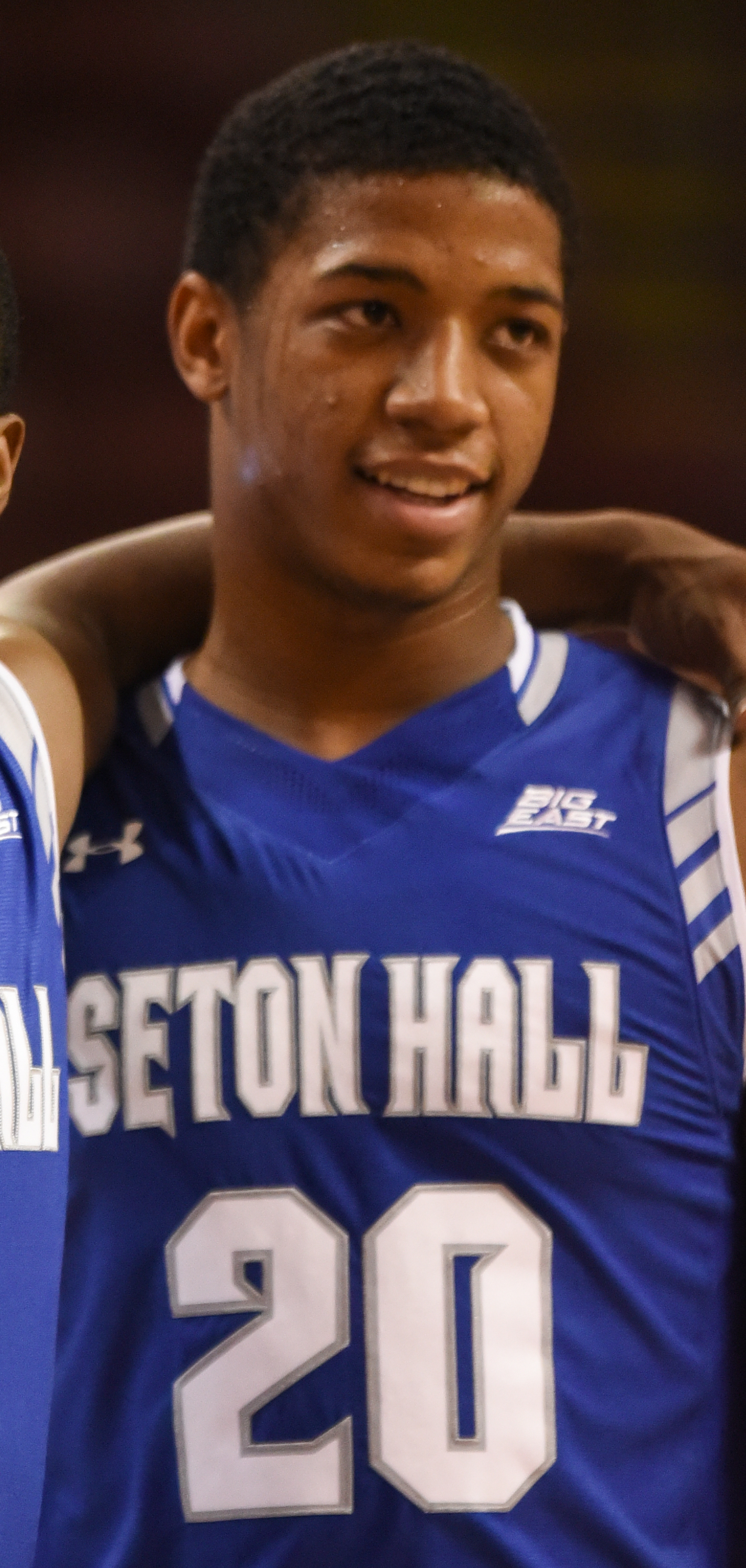
- Rodriguez with Seton Hall in 2015

No. 20 – Ironi Ness Ziona
- Position: Small forward
- League: Israeli Basketball Premier League

Personal information
- Born: March 23, 1996 (age 30) Bronx, New York, U.S.
- Listed height: 6 ft 6 in (1.98 m)
- Listed weight: 240 lb (109 kg)

Career information
- High school: Frederick Douglass (Manhattan, New York); Abraham Lincoln (Brooklyn, New York)
- College: Seton Hall (2014–2018)
- NBA draft: 2018: undrafted
- Playing career: 2018–present

Career history
- 2018–2019: Agua Caliente Clippers
- 2019: Hapoel Tel Aviv
- 2019–2020: Agua Caliente Clippers
- 2020–2021: Riesen Ludwigsburg
- 2021–2022: s.Oliver Würzburg
- 2022–2023: Limoges CSP
- 2023–2025: Nanterre 92
- 2025–present: Ironi Ness Ziona

Career highlights
- All-FIBA Champions League Second Team (2025); Second-team All-Big East (2018)
- Stats at Basketball Reference

Desi Rodriguez (born March 23, 1996) is an American professional basketball player for Ironi Ness Ziona of the Israeli Basketball Premier League. He played college basketball for Seton Hall before playing professionally in the NBA G League, Israel, and France.

== High school career ==
Rodriguez attended the Frederick Douglass Academy for two years. He transferred to Abraham Lincoln High School and befriended his teammate Isaiah Whitehead. He credits this transfer to changing his life as he played against higher levels of competition. Rodriguez helped the team to a PSAL city championship and earned a title-game MVP award. He mainly played center in high school and rarely took jump shots.

== College career ==
Rodriguez committed to Seton Hall, where he averaged 5.6 points per game in his freshman season. He recorded 12.4 points per game as a sophomore. Rodriguez increased his scoring average to 15.7 points per game as a junior. He had 22 points in the February 15, 2017 win against Creighton and joined the 1,000 point club.

Rodriguez was named Big East player of the Week on December 7, after contributing 29 points, eight rebounds and four assists against Louisville. He scored a career-high 33 points in the Pirates' 82–77 win against DePaul on February 18, 2018. Rodriguez injured his ankle in a game against Providence on February 21 and missed the next three games. Despite feeling like it was the end of his collegiate career, he returned in the Big East Tournament quarterfinal against Butler and scored eight points. Rodriguez averaged 17.8 points and 4.9 rebounds per game as a senior, shooting 37.9 percent from 3-point territory. He was named to the Second Team All-Big East. He participated in the 2018 Portsmouth Invitational Tournament.

== Professional career ==
=== 2018–19 season ===
After going undrafted in the 2018 NBA draft, Rodriguez signed with the Los Angeles Clippers for the NBA Summer League, joining Seton Hall teammate Angel Delgado. He had 17 points on 7-of-12 shooting in an 82–69 loss to the Los Angeles Lakers on July 12. Rodriguez signed a training camp contract with the Clippers on September 24. On October 9, 2018, Rodriguez was waived by the Clippers. He was then added to the roster of the Clippers’ NBA G League affiliate, the Agua Caliente Clippers. In 49 G League games played for the Clippers, he averaged 10.3 points, 4.7 rebounds and 2.2 assists per game.

=== 2019–20 season ===
On August 1, 2019, Rodriguez signed a one-year deal with Hapoel Tel Aviv of the Israeli Premier League. On November 8, 2019, he parted ways with Hapoel after appearing in four Israeli League games. He then re-joined the Agua Caliente Clippers on November 19. On January 25, 2020, Rodriguez posted 18 points, nine rebounds, two assists and one steal in a win over the Northern Arizona Suns. Rodriguez averaged 8.8 points and 4.6 rebounds per game.

=== 2020–21 season ===
On August 2, 2020, Rodriquez signed with Riesen Ludwigsburg of the Basketball Bundesliga.

=== 2021–22 season ===
On July 16, 2021, Rodriquez signed a one-year deal with s.Oliver Würzburg of the Basketball Bundesliga.

=== 2022–2023 ===
On June 28, 2022, Rodriguez signed with Limoges CSP of the French LNB Pro A.

=== 2023–present ===
On June 26, 2023, he signed with Nanterre 92 of the LNB Pro A.
