= Seton Hall Pirates men's basketball =

College basketball team

2026–27 Seton Hall Pirates men's basketball team
- University: Seton Hall University
- First season: 1903–04; 123 years ago
- Athletic director: Bryan Felt
- Head coach: Shaheen Holloway; 5th season, 69–64 (.519)
- Location: South Orange, New Jersey
- Arena: Prudential Center (10,481/18,711); Walsh Gymnasium (1,316)
- NCAA division: Division I
- Conference: Big East
- Nickname: Pirates
- Colors: Blue and white
- All-time record: 1639–1181–1 (.581)
- NCAA tournament record: 16–14 (.533)

NCAA Division I tournament runner-up
- 1989
Other NCAA Division I tournament results
Final Four	1989
Elite Eight	1989, 1991
Sweet Sixteen	1989, 1991, 1992, 2000
Appearances	1988, 1989, 1991, 1992, 1993, 1994, 2000, 2004, 2006, 2016, 2017, 2018, 2019, 2022

NIT champions
- 1953, 2024

Conference tournament champions
- Big East: 1991, 1993, 2016

Conference regular-season champions
- NY-NJ 7: 1977 Big East: 1992, 1993, 2020

Uniforms
Home	Away

The Seton Hall Pirates men's basketball program is the NCAA Division I intercollegiate men's basketball program of Seton Hall University in South Orange, New Jersey. The team competes in the Big East Conference and plays their home games in the Prudential Center in Newark, New Jersey. The Pirates are currently coached by Shaheen Holloway. Seton Hall has appeared 14 times in the NCAA tournament and were national runners-up in 1989.

== History ==
Seton Hall's first season of basketball occurred in 1903–04, but the school did not field a team again until 1908–09, the year in which the university achieved its first winning season. The school adopted the Pirate mascot in 1931, and the teams soon gained national prominence with the arrival of John "Honey" Russell in 1936. During an 18-year span, the Pirates racked up a 295–129 record that included an undefeated 19–0 record in 1939–40 as part of a 41-game unbeaten streak. Walsh Gymnasium was opened in 1941 to house the basketball team permanently and featured one of the best Seton Hall teams of all time, termed the "Wonder Five", which led by All-American Bob Davies, earned the school's first NIT bid in 1941. Following World War II, the Pirates were led by stars Frank Saul and Bobby Wanzer and regularly played games at Madison Square Garden. The peak of this era occurred in 1953 when Richie Regan and Walter Dukes defeated rival St. John's University for the NIT title. Perhaps the low point for the team occurred in 1961 when a point shaving scandal sullied the program, but the Pirates rebounded to return to the NIT in 1974 under coach Bill Raftery. Seton Hall became a charter member of the Big East Conference in 1979, where they are still a member to this day.

The 1908–09 Seton Hall basketball team recorded the school's first winning record in its second season of play

Although Seton Hall did have a lengthy American Football Team, The high point of the Big East era for Seton Hall came when P. J. Carlesimo was hired in 1982 and the team began playing in the Meadowlands Arena. By 1988, Carlesimo led the Pirates to the school's first NCAA tournament appearance, and in 1989, he led the Hall to an unexpected tournament run to the NCAA Championship game, where they were defeated by Michigan in overtime. Success under Carlesimo continued with a Big East tournament championship and an Elite Eight appearance in 1991, a regular season Big East Championship and Sweet Sixteen appearance in 1992, and Big East Regular Season and Big East tournament Championships in 1993. Carlesimo left to coach in the NBA following the 1993–94 season, but Seton Hall returned to the Sweet Sixteen in 2000 guided by coach Tommy Amaker, and appeared in the NCAA tournament in 2004 and 2006 coached by Louis Orr. In 2006–07, Bobby Gonzalez was hired to lead the Pirates, which moved its home games into the Prudential Center in 2007. Gonzalez amassed a 66–59 record at Seton Hall but was fired at the conclusion of the 2009–10 after a first-round NIT loss to Texas Tech. Concerns were raised in-house about the direction Gonzalez was taking the program, punctuated by several incidents, some involving Gonzalez and others involving student athletes. Shortly after his dismissal Gonzalez was arrested for shoplifting. Seton Hall then hired Kevin Willard for the 2010–11 season.

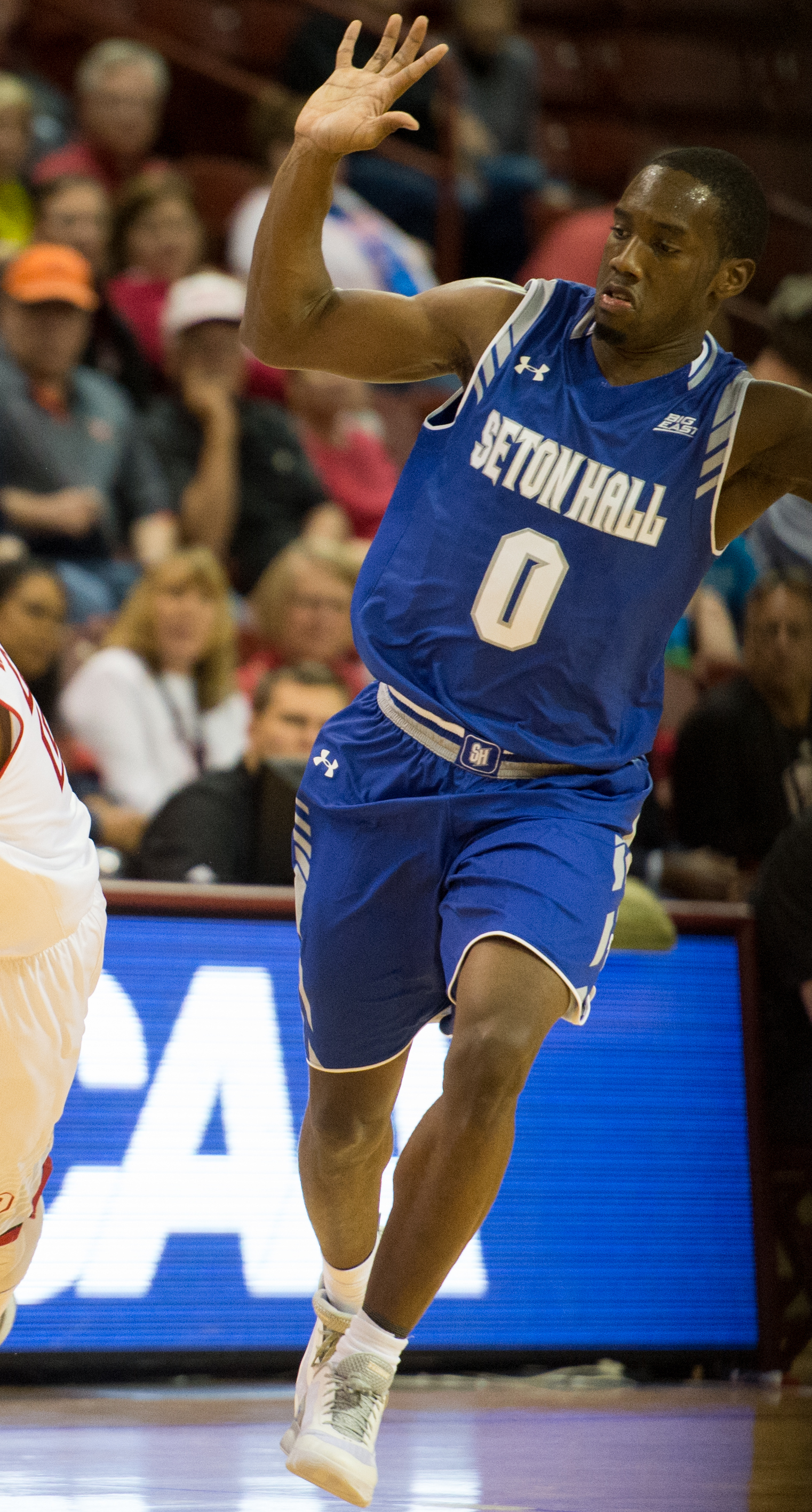
Khadeen Carrington

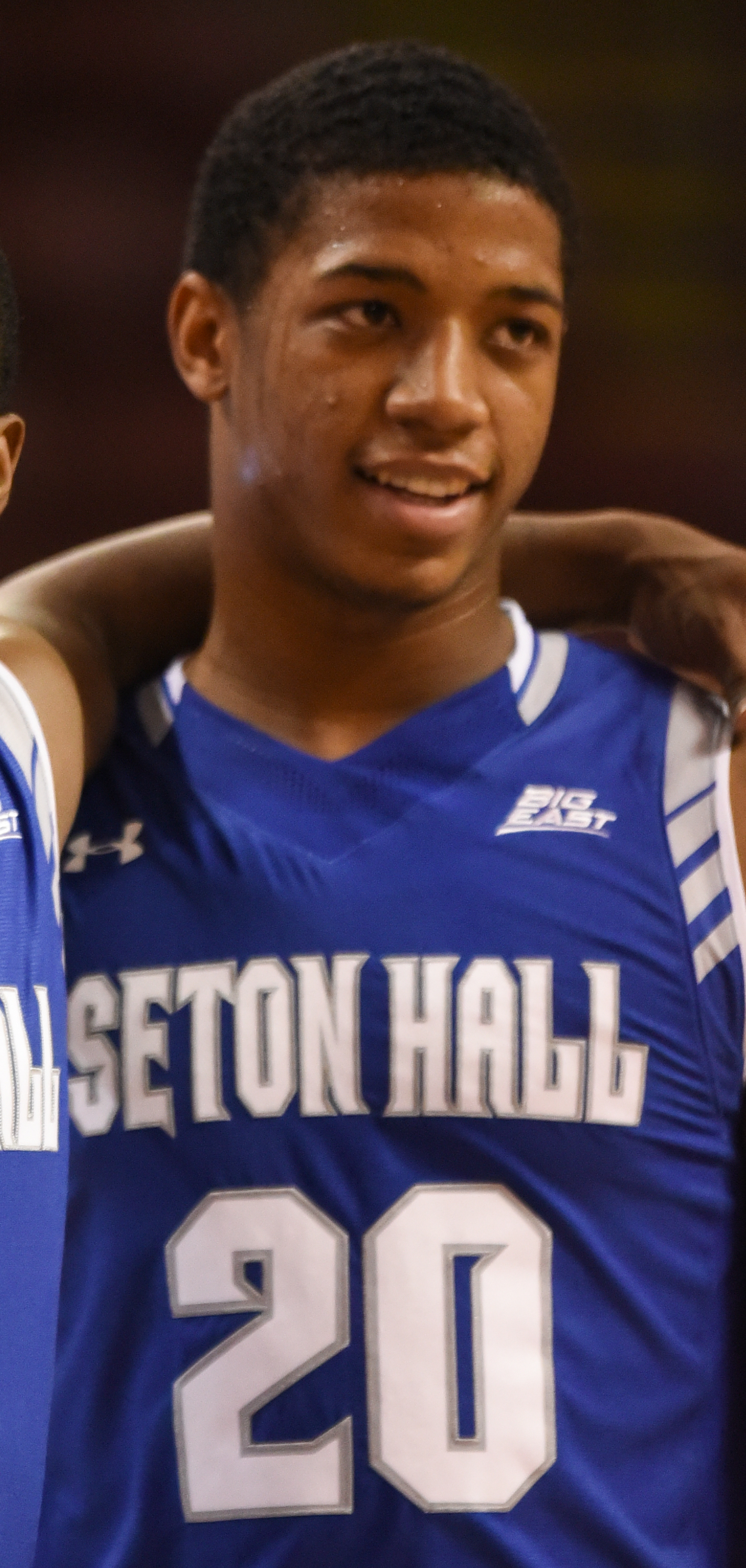
Desi Rodriguez

After struggling to maintain a .500 record through his first five seasons with the program, Willard's Pirates finally broke through in the 2015–16 season, as they won the Big East tournament Championship over the eventual national champion Villanova Wildcats. With the win, Seton Hall secured the school's first NCAA Tournament appearance since 2006 and the first Big East tournament Championship since 1993. However, the magic could not continue in the NCAA tournament, as the team was defeated by the 11th-seeded Gonzaga Bulldogs in the First Round. In 2017, the Pirates were again eliminated in the First Round of the NCAA tournament by the Arkansas Razorbacks, but the Pirates would win their first tournament game in fourteen years upon defeating the NC State Wolfpack in 2018's first round before being defeated by the Kansas Jayhawks in the Second Round.

Following the graduation of starting seniors Khadeen Carrington, Ángel Delgado, Desi Rodriguez, and Ismael Sanogo, the Pirates would appear in their fourth consecutive NCAA tournament for the second time in program history in 2019. Led by the play of standout junior guard Myles Powell, the Pirates, at risk of missing the tournament sitting on a 16–12 overall and 7–9 Big East record, won their final two regular season games at home against 16th-ranked Marquette and 23rd-ranked Villanova and advanced to the Big East Final where they lost a rematch to Villanova by two points. Ultimately, they secured a #10 seed in the tournament following their performance down the stretch, and fell to the Wofford Terriers in a first round game in which Fletcher Magee would break Division I's all-time three-point scoring record. In November 2021, Seton Hall traveled to Ann Arbor, Michigan to play the then #4 ranked Michigan Wolverines as part of the Big East-Big 10 Gavitt Games. Of note was that the game was the first time the two programs had met since the 1989 NCAA National Championship Game when Michigan beat Seton Hall by one on a controversial foul call. In the 2021 version, Seton Hall upset Michigan, making it the first time Seton Hall had won a road game against a non-conference AP top-five team in university history. They were 0–5 prior.

== All-time coaching records ==
Name	Years	Record	Win pct.
William Caffrey	1908–09	10–4	(.714)
Dick McDonough	1909–10	6–2	(.750)
Jim Flanagan	1910–11	4–0	(1.000)
Frank Hill	1911–30	192–75	(.719)
Dan Steinberg	1930–31	12–11	(.522)
Les Fries	1931–33	18–13	(.581)
John Colrick	1933–35	8–22	(.267)
Bob Davies	1946–47	24–3	(.889)
Jack Reitemeier	1947–49	34–12	(.739)
John Russell	1936–43; 1949-60	295–129	(.696)
Richard Regan	1960–70	112–131	(.461)
Bill Raftery	1970–81	154–141	(.522)
Hoddy Mahon	1981–82	11–16	(.407)
P.J. Carlesimo	1982–94	212–166	(.561)
George Blaney	1994–97	38–48	(.442)
Tommy Amaker	1997–01	68–55	(.540)
Louis Orr	2001–06	80–69	(.537)
Bobby Gonzalez	2006–10	66–59	(.528)
Kevin Willard	2010–22	225–161	(.583)
Shaheen Holloway	2022–present	70–65	(.519)

== Postseason ==
=== NCAA tournament results ===
The Pirates have appeared in the NCAA tournament 14 times. Their combined record is 16–14.

Year	Seed	Round	Opponent	Results
1988	#8	First Round; Second Round	#9 UTEP #1 Arizona	W 80–64; L 55–84
1989	#3	First Round; Second Round; Sweet Sixteen; Elite Eight; Final Four; National Championship Game	#14 Southwest Missouri State #11 Evansville #2 Indiana #4 UNLV #2 Duke #3 Michigan	W 60–51; W 87–73; W 78–65; W 84–61; W 95–78; L 79–80 ^{OT}
1991	#3	First Round; Second Round; Sweet Sixteen; Elite Eight	#14 Pepperdine #11 Creighton #2 Arizona #1 UNLV	W 71–51; W 81–69; W 81–77; L 65–77
1992	#4	First Round; Second Round; Sweet Sixteen	#13 La Salle #5 Missouri #1 Duke	W 78–76; W 88–71; L 69–81
1993	#2	First Round; Second Round	#15 Tennessee State #7 WKU	W 81–59; L 68–72
1994	#10	First Round	#7 Michigan State	L 73–84
2000	#10	First Round; Second Round; Sweet Sixteen	#7 Oregon #2 Temple #3 Oklahoma State	W 72–71 ^{OT} W 67–65 ^{OT} L 66–68
2004	#8	First Round; Second Round	#9 Arizona #1 Duke	W 80–76; L 62–90
2006	#10	First Round	#7 Wichita State	L 66–86
2016	#6	First Round	#11 Gonzaga	L 52–68
2017	#9	First Round	#8 Arkansas	L 71–77
2018	#8	First Round; Second Round	#9 NC State #1 Kansas	W 94–83; L 79–83
2019	#10	First Round	#7 Wofford	L 68–84
2022	#8	First Round	#9 TCU	L 42–69

=== NIT results ===
The Pirates have appeared in the National Invitation Tournament (NIT) 19 times. Their combined record is 13–19. They were NIT champions in 1953 and 2024.

Year	Round	Opponent	Result
1941	Quarterfinals; Semifinals; 3rd Place Game	Rhode Island; Long Island; CCNY	W 70–54; L 26–49; L 27–42
1951	First Round; Quarterfinals; Semifinals; 3rd Place Game	Beloit; NC State; BYU; St. John's	W 71–57; W 71–59; L 59–69; L 68–70
1952	First Round	La Salle	L 76–80
1953	Quarterfinals; Semifinals; Final	Niagara; Manhattan; St. John's	W 79–74; W 74–56; W 58–46
1955	First Round	Saint Francis (PA)	L 78–89
1956	First Round; Quarterfinals	Marquette; Saint Joseph's	W 96–78; L 65–74
1957	First Round	Xavier	L 79–85
1974	First Round	Memphis	L 72–73
1977	First Round	Massachusetts	L 85–86
1987	First Round	Niagara	L 65–74
1995	First Round	Canisius	L 71–83
1998	First Round	Georgia Tech	L 70–88
1999	First Round	Old Dominion	L 56–75
2001	First Round	Alabama	L 79–85
2003	First Round	Rhode Island	L 60–61
2010	First Round	Texas Tech	L 69–87
2012	First Round; Second Round	Stony Brook; Massachusetts	W 63–61; L 67–77
2023	First Round	Colorado	L 64–65
2024	First Round; Second Round; Quarterfinals; Semifinals; Final	Saint Joseph's; North Texas; UNLV; Georgia; Indiana State	W 75–72; W 72–58; W 91–68; W 84–67; W 79–77

== Notable players and coaches ==
In 2016, while playing for the Pirates, Derrick Gordon became the first openly gay man to play in the March Madness tournament.

=== Honored and retired jerseys ===
Seton Hall Pirates retired numbers
No.	Player	Position	Career
3	Frank Saul	G/F	1942–43, 1946–49
5	Walter Dukes	C	1950–53
8	Bobby Wanzer	G	1942–43, 1946–47
11	Bob Davies	G	1939–42
12	Richie Regan	G	1950–53
24	Terry Dehere	SG	1989–93
34	Glenn Mosley	PF	1973-77
44	Nick Werkman	G	1961–64

=== Naismith Memorial Basketball Hall of Fame ===
Year Inducted	Name	Position	Years at Seton Hall
1964	John "Honey" Russell	Coach	1936–1943, 1949–60
1970	Bob Davies	Player/Coach	1939–1942, 1946–47
1987	Bobby Wanzer	Player	1942–1943, 1946–47
2017	Nikos Galis	Player	1975–1979

=== FIBA Hall of Fame ===
Year Inducted	Name	Years at Seton Hall
2007	Nikos Galis	1975–1979
2013	Andrew Gaze	1988–1989

== Professional players ==
=== Pirates in the NBA ===
==== Current ====
Player	Team
Sandro Mamukelashvili	Los Angeles Lakers

==== All-time ====
32 Pirates have played at least one game in the NBA.

Name	NBA Draft	Draft Team	Years	Career Highlights and Awards
Anthony Avent	1991 Round 1 Pick 15	Atlanta Hawks	1991–2000	
Andre Barrett	2004 Undrafted	Undrafted	2004–2007	
Mark Bryant	1988 Round 1 Pick 21	Portland Trail Blazers	1988–2003	
Tommy Byrnes	1946 No NBA	Undrafted	1946–1951	
Chuck Connors	1946 No NBA	Undrafted	1946–1948	
Marcus Cousin	Undrafted	Undrafted	2010–2011	
Samuel Dalembert	2001 Round 1 Pick 26	Philadelphia 76ers	2001–2017	
Bob Davies	1942 No NBA	Undrafted	1945–1955	NBA champion (1951); 4× NBA All-Star (1951–1954); 4× All-BAA/NBA First Team (1949–1952); All-NBA Second Team (1953); NBA assists leader (1949); NBA 25th Anniversary Team (1971)
Terry Dehere	1993 Round 1 Pick 13	Los Angeles Clippers	1993–1999	
Ángel Delgado	2018 Undrafted	Undrafted	2018–2019	
Walter Dukes	1953 Territorial Pick	New York Knicks	1955–1963	2× NBA All-Star (1960, 1961)
Bob Fitzgerald	1945 No NBA	Undrafted	1945–1949	
Andrew Gaze	1989 Undrafted	Undrafted	1994–1999	NBA champion (1999)
Adrian Griffin	1996 Undrafted	Undrafted	1999–2008	
Eddie Griffin	2001 Round 1 Pick 7	New Jersey Nets	2001–2007	NBA All-Rookie Second Team (2002)
Howie Janotta	1949 Undrafted	Baltimore Bullets	1949–1950	
Johnny Macknowski	1948 Undrafted	Rochester Royals	1948–1951	
Sandro Mamukelashvili	2021 Round 2 Pick 54	Indiana Pacers	2021–present	
Mike McCarron	1946 No NBA	Undrafted	1946–1950	
John Morton	1989 Round 1 Pick 25	Cleveland Cavaliers	1989–1992	
Glenn Mosley	1977 Round 1 Pick 20	Philadelphia 76ers	1977–1979	
Al Negratti	1943 No NBA	Undrafted	1945–1947	
Myles Powell	2020 Undrafted	Undrafted	2021–2022	
Richie Regan	1953 Round 1 Pick 4	Rochester Royals	1955–1958	NBA All-Star (1957)
Kadary Richmond	2025 Undrafted	Undrafted	2021-2024	
Jared Rhoden	2022 Undrafted	Undrafted	2022–2025	
Ed Sadowski	1940 No NBA	Undrafted	1940–1950	
Pep Saul	1949 Round 1 Pick 10	Rochester Royals	1949–1955	4× NBA champion (1951–1954)
Ben Scharnus	1942 No NBA	Undrafted	1943–1949	
Bobby Wanzer	1948 Round 1 Pick 10	Rochester Royals	1948–1957	NBA champion (1951); 5× NBA All-Star (1952–1956); 3× All-NBA Second Team (1952–1954)
Isaiah Whitehead	2016 Round 2 Pick 42	Utah Jazz	2016–2018	
Luther Wright	1993 Round 1 Pick 18	Utah Jazz	1993–1994	

=== Pirates in international leagues ===
==== Current players overseas ====
Player	Team	Country
Jaden Bediako	Saskatoon Mamba	(Canada)
Khadeen Carrington	Hapoel Tel Aviv B.C.	(Israel)
Al-Amir Dawes	BK Děčín	(Czech Republic)
Myles Powell	Scarborough Shooting Stars	(Canada)
Jared Rhoden	Paris Basketball	(France)
Joshua Rivera	Gigantes de Carolina	(Puerto Rico)

==== All-time players overseas ====
- Myles Cale, in the Liga ACB
- Khadeen Carrington, in the Israeli Premier Basketball League
- KC Ndefo, in the Greek Elite League
- Desi Rodriguez, in the Israeli Premier Basketball League
- Isaiah Whitehead, in the Israeli Basketball Premier League

== Awards and honors ==
=== Individual Coaching honors ===
National Coach of the Year
1989	P.J. Carlesimo	NABC, Sporting News

Big East Coach of the Year Conference coach of the year
1988	P.J. Carlesimo
1989	P.J. Carlesimo
2003	Louis Orr
2016	Kevin Willard
2026	Shaheen Holloway

Lou Carnesecca "The Looie" Award
MWBA Division I coach of the year

1988	P.J. Carlesimo
1989	P.J. Carlesimo
2000	Tommy Amaker
2016	Kevin Willard

2017	Kevin Willard
2019	Kevin Willard
2024	Shaheen Holloway
2026	Shaheen Holloway

=== Individual Player honors ===
National Player of the Year
2001	Eddie Griffin	Wayman Tisdale Award
2018	Ángel Delgado	Kareem Abdul-Jabbar Award
2020	Myles Powell	Jerry West Award

Big East Conference Player of the Year
1982	Dan Callandrillo
1993	Terry Dehere
2020	Myles Powell
2021	Sandro Mamukelashvili

Big East Conference Tournament MVP Dave Gavitt Trophy
1991	Olive Taylor
1993	Terry Dehere
2016	Isaiah Whitehead

Haggerty Award MBWA Division I player of the year
1953	Walter Dukes
1964	Nick Werkman
1979	Nick Galis
1982	Dan Callandrillo
1988	Mark Bryant
1989	John Morton
1994	Artūras Karnišovas
1996	Adrian Griffin
2004	Andre Barrett
2016	Isaiah Whitehead
2017	Ángel Delgado
2019	Myles Powell
2020	Myles Powell
2021	Sandro Mamukelashvili

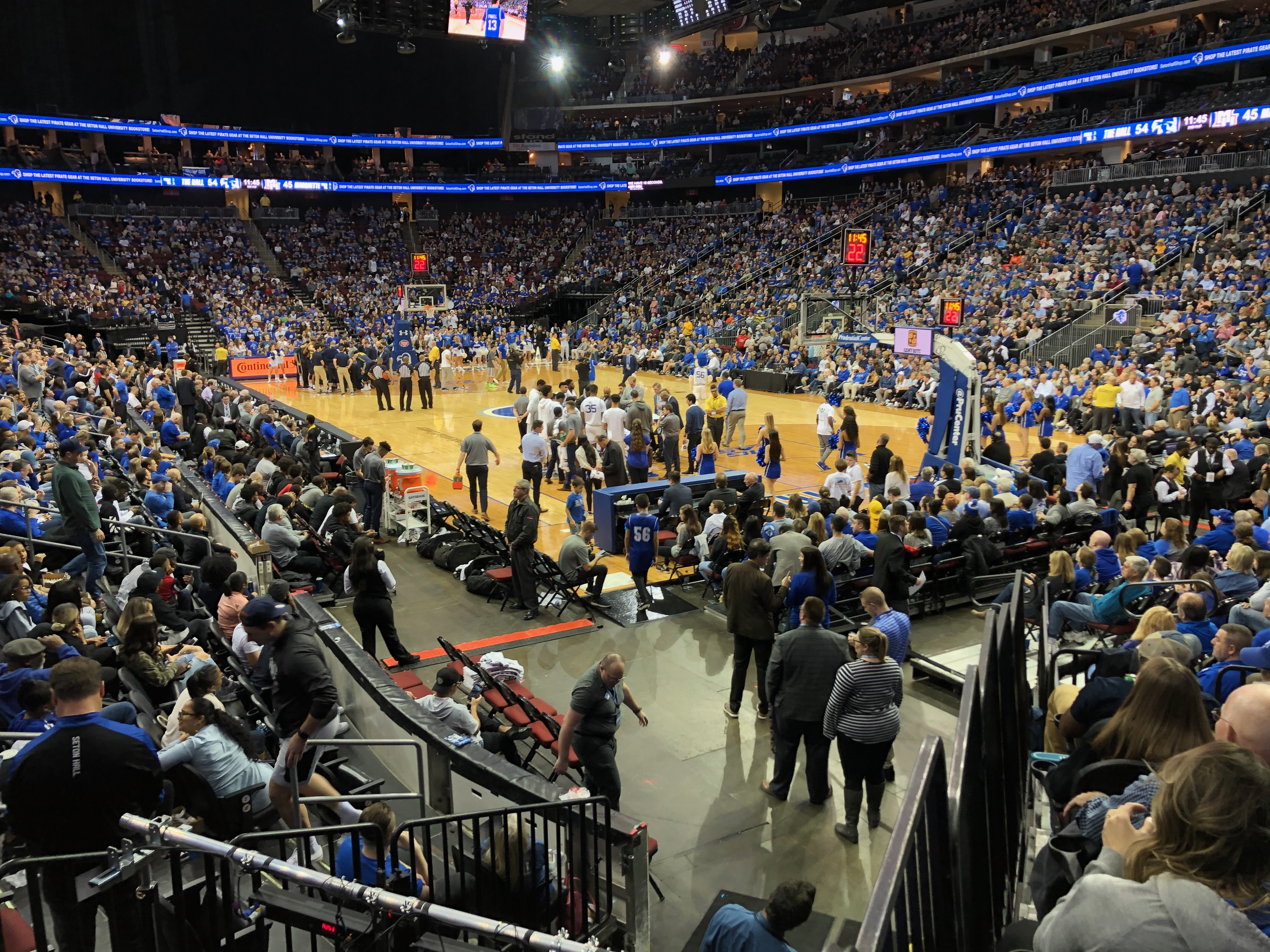
Seton Hall home game at the Prudential Center in Newark, New Jersey.

Conference Individual Awards
1989	Ramon Ramos	Big East Scholar-Athlete of the Year
1993	Artūras Karnišovas	Big East Scholar-Athlete of the Year
1993	Jerry Walker	Big East Defensive Player of the Year
1994	Artūras Karnišovas	Big East Scholar-Athlete of the Year
1996	Adrian Griffin	Big East Scholar-Athlete of the Year
2000	Shaheen Holloway	Big East Most Improved Player
2001	Eddie Griffin	Big East Rookie of the Year
2014	Fuquan Edwin	Big East Defensive Player of the Year
2015	Ángel Delgado	Big East Rookie of the Year
2018	Myles Powell	Big East Most Improved Player
2019	Michael Nzei	Big East Scholar-Athlete of the Year
2020	Romaro Gill	Big East Most Improved Player
2020	Romaro Gill	Big East Defensive Player of the Year
2021	Ike Obiagu	Big East Scholar-Athlete of the Year

MBWA Division I Rookie of the Year
1983	Andre McCloud
1990	Terry Dehere
1991	Jerry Walker
1997	Shaheen Holloway
2000	Darius Lane
2001	Eddie Griffin
2007	Eugene Harvey
2015	Ángel Delgado

McDonald's High School All-Americans

- Luther Wright – 1990
- Shaheen Holloway – 1996
- Andre Barrett – 2000
- Eddie Griffin – 2000
- Isaiah Whitehead – 2014

All-American team selections

Year	Name	Pos.
1942	Bob Davies*	G
1948	Frank Saul§	G
1949	Frank Saul§	G
1952	Walter Dukes§	C
1953	Walter Dukes*	C
1957	Dick Gaines§	G
1963	Nick Werkman‡	F

Year	Name	Pos.
1977	Glenn Mosley§	F
1978	Greg Tynes§	G
1982	Dan Callandrillo‡	G
1991	Anthony Avent§	F
1992	Terry Dehere§	G
1993	Terry Dehere†	G
2001	Eddie Griffin§	F

Year	Name	Pos.
2004	Andrew Barrett§	G
2016	Isaiah Whitehead§	G
2017	Ángel Delgado§	C
2018	Ángel Delgado§	C
2019	Myles Powell§	G
2020	Myles Powell*	G
2021	Sandro Mamukelashvili§	F

* – denotes consensus First-Team All-American
† – denotes consensus Second-Team All-American
‡ – denotes Third-Team AP All-American
§ – denotes AP Honorable Mention All-American

All-Conference team selections

Year	Name	Pos.
1980	Dan Callandrillo‡	G
1981	Dan Callandrillo‡	G
1982	Dan Callandrillo†	G
1987	Mark Bryant‡	F
1988	Mark Bryant†	F
1989	Ramon Ramos†	F
1991	Anthony Avent‡	F
1991	Terry Dehere†	G
1992	Jerry Walker‡	G
1992	Terry Dehere†	G
1993	Arturas Karnišovas‡	F
1993	Terry Dehere†	G
1994	Arturas Karnišovas‡	F

Year	Name	Pos.
1996	Adrian Griffin‡	F
1997	Shaheen Holloway‡	G
1998	Levell Sanders‡	G
2000	Shaheen Holloway‡	G
2001	Eddie Griffin‡	F
2003	Andre Barrett‡	G
2004	Andre Barrett†	G
2006	Kelly Whitney‡	F
2006	Donald Copeland‡	G
2007	Brain Laing‡	G
2008	Brain Laing†	G
2010	Jeremy Hazell‡	G
2012	Jordan Theodore‡	G

Year	Name	Pos.
2014	Fuquan Edwin‡	G
2015	Sterling Gibbs‡	G
2016	Isaiah Whitehead†	G
2017	Khadeen Carrington‡	G
2017	Ángel Delgado†	C
2018	Desi Rodriguez‡	F
2018	Ángel Delgado‡	C
2019	Myles Powell†	G
2020	Myles Powell†	G
2021	Sandro Mamukelashvili†	F
2022	Jared Rhoden†	G
2024	Kadary Richmond†	G

† – denotes First-Team All-Conference
‡ – denotes Second-Team All-Conference

Consensus First Team All-Metropolitan

- Dan Callandrillo – 1981, 1982
- Mark Bryant – 1988
- John Morton – 1989
- Ramon Ramos – 1989
- Michael Cooper – 1990
- Terry Dehere – 1990, 1991, 1992, 1993
- Anthony Avent – 1991
- Jerry Walker – 1992
- Arturas Karnišovas – 1993, 1994
- Bryan Caver – 1994
- Adrian Griffin – 1995, 1996
- Danny Hurley – 1996
- Shaheen Holloway – 1997, 2000
- Eddie Griffin – 2001
- Andre Barrett – 2002, 2003, 2004
- Kelly Whitney – 2004, 2006
- Eugene Harvey – 2007
- Brian Laing – 2008
- Jeremy Hazell – 2009, 2010, 2011
- Herb Pope – 2012
- Jordan Theodore – 2012
- Fuquan Edwin – 2013, 2014
- Isaiah Whitehead – 2016
- Khadeen Carrington – 2017
- Ángel Delgado – 2017, 2018
- Desi Rodriguez – 2018

== All-time career leaders ==
Lists are accurate through the 2024–25 season.

Points
Rank	Points	Player	Years
1	2494	Terry Dehere	1989–93
2	2273	Nick Werkman	1961–64
3	2252	Myles Powell	2016–20
4	2146	Jeremy Hazell	2007–11
5	2059	Greg Tynes	1974–78
6	1985	Dan Callandrillo	1978–82
7	1976	Andre McCloud	1982–86
8	1906	Mark Bryant	1984–88
9	1861	Andre Barrett	2000–04
10	1846	Khadeen Carrington	2014–18

Rebounds
Rank	Rebounds	Player	Years
1	1697	Walter Dukes	1950–53
2	1455	Angel Delgado	2014–18
3	1263	Glenn Mosley	1973–77
4	1149	Ken House	1969–72
5	1036	Nick Werkman	1961–64
6	922	Herb Pope	2009–12
7	912	Mark Bryant	1984–88
8	830	Richie Dec	1962–65
9	803	Adrian Griffin	1992–96
10	763	Kelly Whitney	2002–06

Assists
Rank	Assists	Player	Years
1	681	Shaheen Holloway	1996–00
2	662	Andre Barrett	2000–04
3	576	Eugene Harvey	2006–10
4	541	Jordan Theodore	2008–12
5	528	Gerald Greene	1985–89
6	452	John Morton	1985–89
7	443	Richie Regan	1950–53
8	439	Golden Sunkett	1961–64
9	437	Danny Hurley	1991–96
10	422	Kadary Richmond	2021–24

Steals
Rank	Steals	Player	Years
1	295	Fuquan Edwin	2010–14
2	260	Dan Callandrillo	1978–82
3	256	Paul Gause	2005–09
4	231	Shaheen Holloway	1996–00
5	207	Adrian Griffin	1992–96
5	207	John Morton	1985–89
7	203	Eugene Harvey	2006–10
8	202	Levell Sanders	1994–98
9	191	Jeremy Hazell	2007–11
10	183	Kadary Richmond	2021–24

Blocks
Rank	Blocks	Player	Years
1	206	Ike Obiagu	2019–22
2	167	Samuel Dalembert	1999–01
3	156	Howard McNeil	1978–82
4	153	Herb Pope	2009–12
5	149	John Garcia	2005–10
6	146	Ramon Ramos	1986–89
7	133	Eddie Griffin	2000–01
8	129	Romaro Gill	2018–20
9	125	Glenn Mosley	1973–77
10	121	Arturas Karnisovas	1990–94
10	121	Anthony Avent	1988–91

== See also ==
- NCAA Men's Division I Final Four appearances by coaches
- NCAA Men's Division I Final Four appearances by school
