= P. J. Carlesimo =

American basketball coach (born 1949)

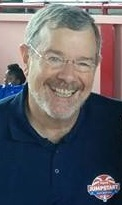
- Carlesimo in 2015

Personal information
- Born: May 30, 1949 (age 77) Scranton, Pennsylvania, U.S.
- Listed height: 6 ft 1 in (1.85 m)
- Listed weight: 185 lb (84 kg)

Career information
- High school: Scranton Prep (Scranton, Pennsylvania)
- College: Fordham (1968–1971)
- NBA draft: 1971: undrafted
- Position: Guard
- Coaching career: 1971–2013

Career highlights
- As head coach: NCAA Division I Regional — Final Four (1989); Mayflower regular season champion (1976); 2x Big East tournament champion (1991, 1993); 2x Big East regular season champion (1992, 1993); NABC Coach of the Year (1989); Sporting News Coach of the Year (1989); 2× Big East Coach of the Year (1988, 1989); As assistant coach: 3× NBA champion (2003, 2005, 2007)

Career coaching record
- NBA: 239–315 (.431)
- College: 277–259 (.517)
- Record at Basketball Reference
Medals
Assistant coach for United States
men's national basketball team
Olympic Games
Gold medal – first place	1992 Barcelona	Team

Peter John Carlesimo (born May 30, 1949) is an American former basketball coach who coached in both the National Basketball Association (NBA) and college basketball for nearly 40 years. He is also a television broadcaster and has worked with ESPN, The NBA on TNT, Westwood One, Fox Sports Southwest, Pac-12 Network, The NBA on NBC, and CSN New England.

Carlesimo served as the head coach of four NBA teams, the interim head coach of another NBA team, and was named Seton Hall University's "Coach of the Century". He was an assistant coach for the United States men's Olympic basketball team ("The Dream Team") that won the gold medal at the 1992 Summer Olympics. He was also an assistant coach for the San Antonio Spurs team that won three championships between 2003 and 2007.

== Early coaching career ==
Carlesimo is a 1971 graduate of Fordham University, where he played basketball under coach Digger Phelps. He began his coaching career as an assistant at the school after he graduated. He received his first head coaching job when he took over New Hampshire College (now Southern New Hampshire University) for one year, beginning in 1975. The New Hampshire Penmen ended the 1975–1976 season with a 14–13 record and won the Mayflower Conference championship. Carlesimo also had a successful coaching stint at Wagner College of Staten Island, New York, a Division I school, leading the team to one NIT berth in six years as coach from 1976 to 1982. In addition, Carlesimo spent time coaching in Puerto Rico during the summers.

== Seton Hall University coaching years ==
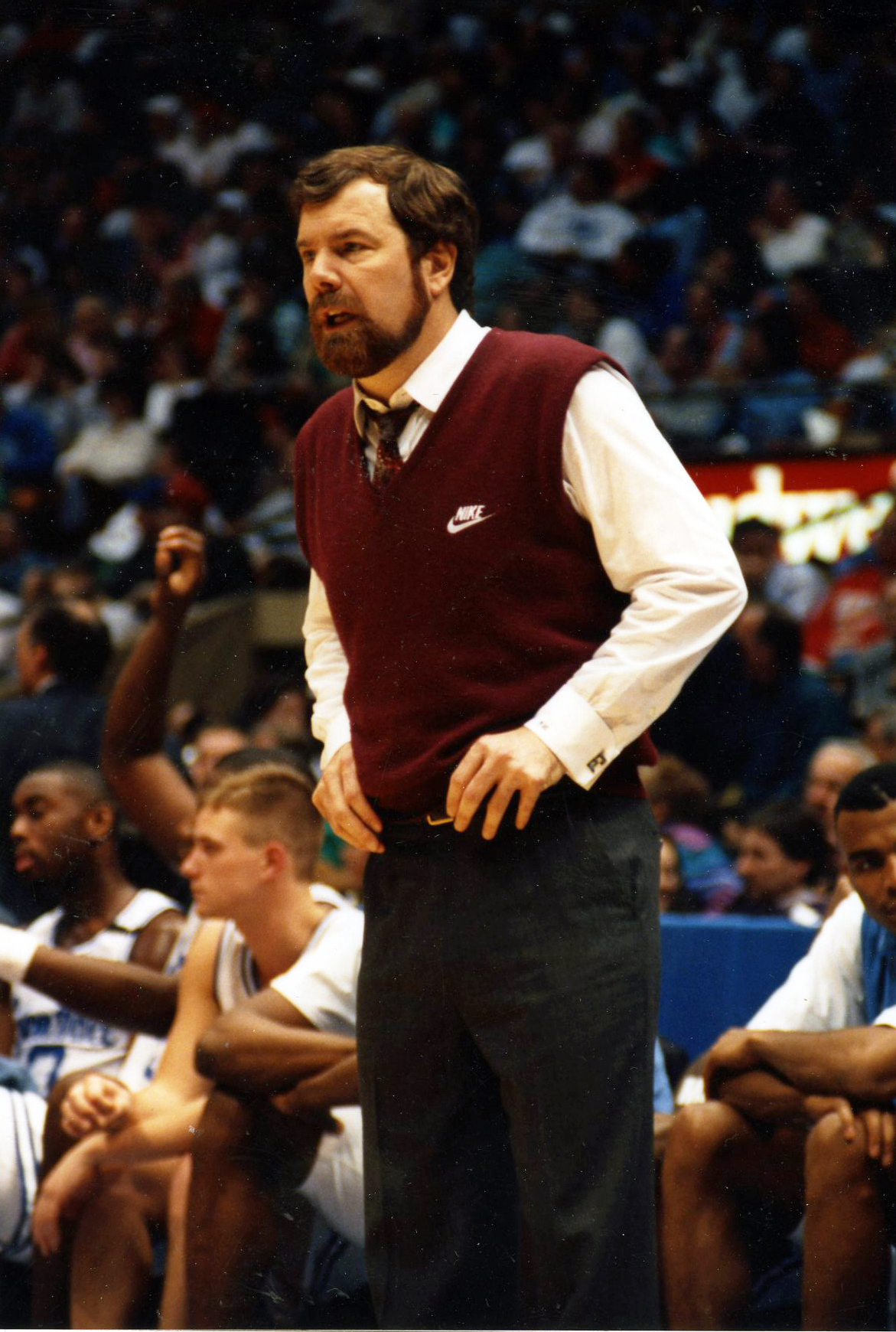
Carlesimo coaching at Seton Hall in the early 1990s.

Carlesimo coached Seton Hall University from 1982 to 1994, leading the turnaround of a struggling program. The Pirates made their first ever NCAA tournament in 1988, and Carlesimo was named the Big East Conference coach of the year.

In 1989, Carlesimo led the Pirates to their first-ever Final Four appearance following a 78–65 upset over the #2 seed Indiana Hoosiers coached by Bobby Knight. They advanced to the NCAA Championship game against the Michigan Wolverines, but lost in overtime 80–79. Carlesimo was again named Big East coach of the year, following the 1989 season.

During Carlesimo's tenure the Pirates went to the NCAA tournament six times, four of them consecutively from 1991 until 1994. After a 6–23 record in his first season, he turned the team into a consistent title contender and eventual tournament runner-up and number one seed. Compiling an overall record of 212–166, he was named Seton Hall's "Coach of the Century".

Carlesimo was an assistant coach under Mike Krzyzewski with the U.S. national team in the 1990 FIBA World Championship, winning the bronze medal. He also was an assistant coach on the 1992 Olympic "Dream Team", winning a gold medal.

== NBA coaching career ==
On June 23, 1994, Carlesimo was hired as head coach of the Portland Trail Blazers. Midway into his first season with the team, the team traded long-time Blazer Clyde Drexler in an effort to rebuild. However instead of falling in the standings, Carlesimo led the team to a winning record and the playoffs in his first season as an NBA head coach. He led the Blazers to the playoffs in each of his three years as their head coach, but was unable to lead the team out of the first round of the playoffs and was fired following the 1996–97 season.

In 1997, Carlesimo headed to the Golden State Warriors, again succeeding Rick Adelman as head coach (Adelman had previously coached the Trail Blazers prior to Carlesimo's hiring). He coached that team until December 1999, at which point he was fired after his team got off to a losing start for the third straight year.

During a practice during the 1997–98 season while Carlesimo was head coach of the Warriors, he was attacked by Latrell Sprewell. Sprewell choked Carlesimo for nearly 15 seconds until he was pulled off by other coaches and staff; Sprewell elbowed him several minutes later. The Warriors terminated Sprewell's contract, and the NBA suspended him for a year.

After leaving the Warriors, Carlesimo worked as a broadcaster and analyst with The NBA on TNT until being hired as an assistant coach under Gregg Popovich in 2002. He worked with the Spurs until 2007, winning three championships in five seasons (2003, 2005, and 2007). Spurs GM Sam Presti was hired as general manager of the Seattle SuperSonics after the 2007 championship, and hired Carlesimo as their head coach on July 5, 2007. The team broke up the core of Ray Allen and Rashard Lewis which made for a difficult first season. That season, their second overall pick Kevin Durant was named NBA Rookie of the Year.

The Sonics relocated to Oklahoma City a year later, where they became the Oklahoma City Thunder, making him the first head coach in Thunder history. Carlesimo was fired on November 22, 2008, by the Thunder after a 1–12 start. During his time with the Sonics and Thunder, he coached the USA select basketball team that scrimmaged with the US National Team in preparation for the 2007 FIBA tournament and 2008 Summer Olympics. The team included Kevin Durant and Jeff Green, both players with the Thunder.

On May 31, 2010, Carlesimo had reached an agreement to join the Toronto Raptors as an assistant coach under Jay Triano. After one season with the Raptors, he was hired as an assistant coach by the New Jersey Nets (now known as the Brooklyn Nets).

On December 27, 2012, he was promoted to interim head coach of the Nets after the firing of Avery Johnson. Carlesimo took a team floundering at 14–14, and compiled 35–19 record for a fourth-place finish in the East, earning home-court advantage for the Nets in the first round. On May 5, 2013, Nets general manager Billy King announced Carlesimo would not be retained as head coach after the team lost in their first round series against the Chicago Bulls in seven games.

== Head coaching record ==
=== College ===
Record table
Season	Team	Overall	Conference	Standing	Postseason
New Hampshire College Penmen (Mayflower Conference) (1975–1976)
1975–76	New Hampshire College	14–13		1st	
New Hampshire College:		14–13 (.519)			
Wagner Seahawks (NCAA Division I independent) (1976–1981)
1976–77	Wagner	3–21			
1977–78	Wagner	7–19			
1978–79	Wagner	21–7			NIT first round
1979–80	Wagner	14–13			
1980–81	Wagner	16–11			
Wagner Seahawks (Eastern College Athletic Conference) (1981–1982)
1981–82	Wagner	4–22	1–14 (North)		
Wagner:		65–93 (.411)	1–14 (.067)		
Seton Hall Pirates (Big East Conference) (1982–1994)
1982–83	Seton Hall	6–23	1–15	9th	
1983–84	Seton Hall	9–19	2–14	9th	
1984–85	Seton Hall	10–18	1–15	9th	
1985–86	Seton Hall	14–18	3–13	9th	
1986–87	Seton Hall	15–14	4–12	7th	NIT first round
1987–88	Seton Hall	22–13	8–8	6th	NCAA Division I second round
1988–89	Seton Hall	31–7	11–5	2nd	NCAA Division I Runner-up
1989–90	Seton Hall	12–16	5–11	7th	
1990–91	Seton Hall	25–9	9–7	T–3rd	NCAA Division I Elite Eight
1991–92	Seton Hall	23–9	12–6	T–1st	NCAA Division I Sweet 16
1992–93	Seton Hall	28–7	14–4	1st	NCAA Division I second round
1993–94	Seton Hall	17–13	8–10	7th	NCAA Division I first round
Seton Hall:		212–166 (.561)	72–109 (.398)		
Total:		291–272 (.517)			
National champion Postseason invitational champion Conference regular season champion Conference regular season and conference tournament champion Division regular season champion Division regular season and conference tournament champion Conference tournament champion

=== NBA ===
Legend
Regular season	G	Games coached	W	Games won	L	Games lost	W–L %	Win–loss %
Playoffs	PG	Playoff games	PW	Playoff wins	PL	Playoff losses	PW–L %	Playoff win–loss %

Team	Year	G	W	L	W–L%	Finish	PG	PW	PL	PW–L%	Result
Portland	1994–95	82	44	38	.537	4th in Pacific	3	0	3	.000	Lost in first round
Portland	1995–96	82	44	38	.537	3rd in Pacific	5	2	3	.400	Lost in first round
Portland	1996–97	82	49	33	.598	3rd in Pacific	4	1	3	.250	Lost in first round
Golden State	1997–98	82	19	63	.232	6th in Pacific	—	—	—	—	Missed playoffs
Golden State	1998–99	50	21	29	.420	6th in Pacific	—	—	—	—	Missed playoffs
Golden State	1999–00	27	6	21	.222	(fired)	—	—	—	—	—
Seattle	2007–08	82	20	62	.244	5th in Northwest	—	—	—	—	Missed playoffs
Oklahoma City	2008–09	13	1	12	.077	(fired)	—	—	—	—	—
Brooklyn	2012–13	54	35	19	.648	2nd in Atlantic	7	3	4	.429	Lost in first round
Career		554	239	315	.431		19	6	13	.316	

== Filmography ==
Year	Title	Role	Notes	Ref
2012	The Other Dream Team	Himself	Documentary about the Lithuania men's national basketball team at the 1992 Summer Olympics.	

== Personal life ==
Carlesimo is married and has two sons.

He is the son of college basketball coach and athletic director Peter A. Carlesimo.

== See also ==
- List of NCAA Division I men's basketball tournament Final Four appearances by coach
