= 1992–93 Pittsburgh Panthers men's basketball team =

American college basketball season

1992–93 Pittsburgh Panthers men's basketball

NCAA tournament, first round, L 65–86 vs. Utah
- Conference: Big East Conference (1979–2013)
- Record: 17–11 (9–9 Big East)
- Head coach: Paul Evans (7th season)
- Assistant coaches: Norm Law (7th season); Mark Coleman (7th season); Joe DeSantis (1st season)
- Home arena: Fitzgerald Field House (Capacity: 4,122)

1992–93 Big East men's basketball standings
| | Conf. | | | | Overall |
| Team | W | | L | PCT | W | | L | PCT |
|---|---|---|---|---|---|---|---|---|
| No. 6 Seton Hall † | 14 | – | 4 | .778 | 28 | – | 7 | .800 |
| St. John's | 12 | – | 6 | .667 | 19 | – | 11 | .633 |
| Syracuse | 10 | – | 8 | .556 | 20 | – | 9 | .690 |
| Connecticut | 9 | – | 9 | .500 | 15 | – | 13 | .536 |
| Providence | 9 | – | 9 | .500 | 20 | – | 13 | .606 |
| Pittsburgh | 9 | – | 9 | .500 | 17 | – | 11 | .607 |
| Boston College | 9 | – | 9 | .500 | 18 | – | 13 | .581 |
| Georgetown | 8 | – | 10 | .444 | 20 | – | 13 | .606 |
| Miami | 7 | – | 11 | .389 | 10 | – | 17 | .370 |
| Villanova | 3 | – | 15 | .167 | 8 | – | 19 | .296 |
† 1993 Big East tournament winner As of April 5, 1993; Rankings from AP Poll

The 1992–93 Pittsburgh Panthers men's basketball team represented the University of Pittsburgh in the 1992–93 NCAA Division I men's basketball season. Led by head coach Paul Evans, the Panthers finished with a record of 17–11. They received an at-large bid to the 1993 NCAA Division I men's basketball tournament where, as a #9 seed, they lost in the first round to Utah.
