= Éric Micoud =

French basketball player

Éric Micoud (born 18 March 1973 in Cotonou, Benin) is a French basketball player who played 20 games for the men's French national team between 1999 and 2001 .
