= Andrew Barrett =

Andrew or Andy Barrett may refer to:

- Andrew C. Barrett (born 1940), American attorney
- A. W. Barrett (Andrew Washington Barrett, 1845–1905), Los Angeles businessman
- Andy Barrett, a character from the Australian soap opera Home and Away
