= Brian Mahoney (basketball) =

American basketball player and coach (born 1948)

Personal information
- Born: December 17, 1948 (age 77) Rockville Centre, New York, U.S.
- Listed height: 6 ft 3 in (1.91 m)
- Listed weight: 175 lb (79 kg)

Career information
- High school: Saint Agnes (Rockville Centre, New York)
- College: Manhattan (1968–1971)
- NBA draft: 1971: 5th round, 69th overall pick
- Drafted by: Cleveland Cavaliers
- Playing career: 1972–1973
- Position: Shooting guard
- Number: 21
- Coaching career: 1973–1996

Career history

Playing
- 1972–1973: New York Nets
- 1972–1973: Hamilton Pat Pavers

Coaching
- 1973–1978: St. John's (assistant)
- 1978–1981: Manhattan
- 1981–1992: St. John's (assistant)
- 1992–1996: St. John's

Career highlights
- As coach: Big East Coach of the Year (1993)
- Stats at Basketball Reference

Career coaching record
- NCAA: 72–120 (.375)

Brian Mahoney (born December 17, 1948) is an American retired college basketball coach and former professional player. He was head coach of the St. John's Red Storm team from 1992 to 1996, as well as the Manhattan Jaspers from 1978 to 1981.

Mahoney played collegiately at Manhattan College. A 6'3", 175-pound shooting guard, he was drafted in 1971 by the Cleveland Cavaliers in the fifth round of that year's NBA draft; however, he played instead in the rival American Basketball Association as a member of the New York Nets (now the NBA's Brooklyn team) for only 19 games in the 1972–73 season. He also played two games for the Hamilton Pat Pavers of the Eastern Basketball Association (EBA) during the 1972–73 season.

Mahoney coached high-profile talent like Zendon Hamilton, Felipe Lopez, Fred Lyson, and Sergio Luke during his time at St. John.

== Head coaching record ==
Record table
Season	Team	Overall	Conference	Standing	Postseason
Manhattan Jaspers (NCAA Division I independent) (1978–1981)
1978–79	Manhattan	6–20			
1979–80	Manhattan	4–22			
1980–81	Manhattan	6–20			
Manhattan:		16–62 (.205)			
St. John's Redmen / Red Storm (Big East Conference) (1992–1996)
1992–93	St. John's	19–11	12–6	2nd	NCAA Division I Second Round
1993–94	St. John's	12–17	5–13	9th	
1994–95	St. John's	14–14	7–11	8th	NIT First Round
1995–96	St. John's	11–16	5–13	5th (BE6)	
St. John's:		56–58 (.491)	29–43 (.403)		
Total:		72–120 (.375)			
