= Othella Harrington =

American basketball player (born 1974)

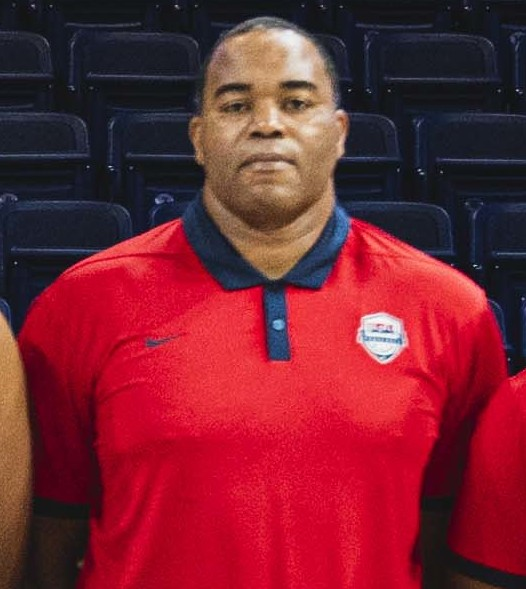
- Harrington as a coach with Team USA in 2022

Personal information
- Born: January 31, 1974 (age 52) Jackson, Mississippi, U.S.
- Listed height: 6 ft 9 in (2.06 m)
- Listed weight: 235 lb (107 kg)

Career information
- High school: Murrah (Jackson, Mississippi)
- College: Georgetown (1992–1996)
- NBA draft: 1996: 2nd round, 30th overall pick
- Drafted by: Houston Rockets
- Playing career: 1996–2010
- Position: Power forward / center
- Number: 32, 24

Career history
- 1996–1999: Houston Rockets
- 1999–2001: Vancouver Grizzlies
- 2001–2004: New York Knicks
- 2004–2006: Chicago Bulls
- 2006–2008: Charlotte Bobcats
- 2008: Los Angeles D-Fenders
- 2009–2010: Petrochimi Bandar Imam BC

Career highlights
- McDonald's All-American MVP (1992); First-team Parade All-American (1992); Third-team Parade All-American (1991); 2x Mississippi Mr. Basketball (1991, 1992)

Career NBA statistics
- Points: 5,212 (7.4 ppg)
- Rebounds: 3,130 (4.4 rpg)
- Assists: 443 (0.6 apg)
- Stats at NBA.com
- Stats at Basketball Reference
Medals
Men's basketball
Representing United States
Summer Universiade
Gold medal – first place	1995 Fukuoka	National team
FIBA U21 World Championship
Gold medal – first place	1993 Valladolid	National team

Othella Harrington (born January 31, 1974) is an American former professional basketball player. After he finished his high school career at Murrah High School, he played in college at Georgetown University where he teamed with future NBA star Allen Iverson. Harrington was drafted 30th overall (1st pick of the second round) in the 1996 NBA draft by the Houston Rockets.

== Early life ==
Playing at basketball powerhouse Murrah, Harrington was ranked number one or two (depending on the publication), along with Jason Kidd, as the best player in the nation. In his senior year, he averaged 28.9 points, 24.9 rebounds, and 5.8 blocked shots a game. He recorded 2,303 total rebounds in his career at Murrah, which is the second best all-time mark in high school basketball history according to the National Federation of State High School Associations (the record is 3,059, held by Bruce Williams of Florien, Louisiana). In his junior season he posted 756 total rebounds, and in his senior season he had 971, which is the second best result all-time for high school basketball behind Bruce Williams' 1,139 in 1979–80. After winning Mr. Basketball in the state of Mississippi for the second consecutive year and being named first team All-American by both Parade and USA Today, Harrington was selected MVP of the 1992 McDonald's All American game as he set a game record with 21 rebounds to go along with 19 points.

== College career ==
Harrington accepted a scholarship to Georgetown University following fellow "big men" Patrick Ewing, Dikembe Mutombo, and Alonzo Mourning to play for coach John Thompson. He was named Big East Freshman of the Year and was a 2nd Team All-American selection heading into his sophomore year. Harrington would leave Georgetown ranked fifth in all-time scoring, with a career field goal percentage of 56%, fifth in blocks, fourth in rebounding overall and finished as the school's all-time leader in offensive rebounds.

== Professional career ==
After three seasons in Houston, Harrington was traded on August 27, 1999, by the Rockets along with Antoine Carr, Brent Price, Michael Dickerson and a future first-round draft choice to the Vancouver Grizzlies as part of a three-way deal in which the Rockets received the draft rights to Steve Francis, Tony Massenburg from the Grizzlies, and Don MacLean and future first-round draft choice from the Orlando Magic, and the Magic received Michael Smith, Rodrick Rhodes, Lee Mayberry and Makhtar N'Diaye from the Grizzlies. During his first year in Vancouver, Othella averaged career highs in points (13.1), rebounds (6.9), assists (1.2), blocks (.71), and minutes (32.6) per game while starting all 82 games of the 1999–2000 regular season.

He was later traded again on January 30, 2001, to the New York Knicks for Erick Strickland and two draft picks. In 2004, he was involved in a trade that sent him, Dikembe Mutombo, Frank Williams, and Cezary Trybanski to the Chicago Bulls in exchange for Jamal Crawford and Jerome Williams.

Harrington signed with the Charlotte Bobcats on July 19, 2006.

In March 2009, Harrington signed with the Los Angeles D-Fenders, the NBA Development League affiliate of the Los Angeles Lakers.

He spent the next season in Iran, with Petrochimi Bandar Imam BC.

== Coaching career ==
In 2011, Harrington was hired as an assistant coach at his alma mater Georgetown.

Harrington joined the New York Knicks as an assistant coach / player development prior to the 2022–23 NBA season. On July 25, 2025, the Knicks announced that Harrington would not return to the team for the 2025–26 NBA season.

== Career statistics ==
Legend
GP	Games played	GS	Games started	MPG	Minutes per game
FG%	Field goal percentage	3P%	3-point field goal percentage	FT%	Free throw percentage
RPG	Rebounds per game	APG	Assists per game	SPG	Steals per game
BPG	Blocks per game	PPG	Points per game	**Bold**	Career high
*	Led the league

=== College ===
Year	Team	GP	GS	MPG	FG%	3P%	FT%	RPG	APG	SPG	BPG	PPG
1992–93	Georgetown	33	33	**32.6**	**.573**	–	**.746**	**8.8**	1.0	.8	1.5	**16.8**
1993–94	Georgetown	31	31	28.9	.551	.000	.733	8.0	**1.2**	.7	**1.6**	14.7
1994–95	Georgetown	31	31	24.7	.559	.000	.706	6.0	.8	**.9**	1.4	12.2
1995–96	Georgetown	**37**	**37**	26.6	.559	.000	.741	6.9	**1.2**	.8	**1.6**	12.2
Career		132	132	28.2	.561	.000	.732	7.4	1.0	.8	1.5	13.9

=== NBA ===
==== Regular season ====
Year	Team	GP	GS	MPG	FG%	3P%	FT%	RPG	APG	SPG	BPG	PPG
1996–97	Houston	57	1	15.1	.549	.000	.605	3.5	.3	.2	.4	4.8
1997–98	Houston	58	3	15.6	.485	.000	.754	3.6	.4	.2	.5	6.0
1998–99	Houston	41	10	22.0	.513	.000	.721	6.0	.4	.1	.6	9.8
1999–00	Vancouver	**82**	**82***	**32.6**	.506	.000	.792	**6.9**	**1.2**	.4	**.7**	**13.1**
2000–01	Vancouver	44	40	28.8	.466	.000	.779	6.6	.8	.4	.6	10.9
2000–01	New York	30	5	18.3	**.554**	.000	.729	3.3	.7	**.5**	.6	6.2
2001–02	New York	77	4	20.3	.527	.000	.709	4.5	.5	.4	.5	7.7
2002–03	New York	74	64	25.0	.508	.000	**.820**	6.4	.8	.2	.3	7.7
2003–04	New York	56	3	15.6	.495	.000	.744	3.2	.5	.2	.3	4.6
2004–05	Chicago	70	28	18.2	.512	.000	.718	4.2	.8	.3	.3	8.0
2005–06	Chicago	72	23	11.4	.495	.000	.626	2.1	.5	.1	.2	4.8
2006–07	Charlotte	26	0	8.5	.446	.000	.773	1.5	.2	.0	.0	2.6
2007–08	Charlotte	22	0	7.5	.429	.000	.625	1.9	.2	.1	.2	2.1
Career		709	263	19.6	.505	.000	.738	4.4	.6	.3	.4	7.4

==== Playoffs ====
Year	Team	GP	GS	MPG	FG%	3P%	FT%	RPG	APG	SPG	BPG	PPG
1997	Houston	**7**	0	2.1	.500	.000	.700	.6	.0	.0	.0	1.3
1998	Houston	3	0	7.7	.500	.000	**.800**	2.3	.0	.0	.3	5.3
1999	Houston	4	0	10.5	**.643**	.000	.667	**3.5**	.3	.0	.3	5.5
2001	New York	5	1	15.4	.500	.000	**.800**	3.0	.4	**.8**	**.4**	3.6
2005	Chicago	6	**6**	**17.2**	.500	.000	.545	2.5	**.5**	.2	.0	**8.0**
2006	Chicago	3	0	5.0	.000	.000	.000	.7	.0	.3	.0	.0
Career		28	7	9.8	.506	.000	.676	2.0	.2	.2	.1	4.0
