= 1993 Big East men's basketball tournament =

- Classification: Division I
- Season: 1992–93
- Teams: 10
- Site: Madison Square Garden; New York City
- Champions: Seton Hall (2nd title)
- Winning coach: P. J. Carlesimo (2nd title)
- MVP: Terry Dehere (Seton Hall)

1992–93 Big East men's basketball standings
	Conf.				Overall
Team	W		L	PCT	W		L	PCT
No. 6 Seton Hall †	14	–	4	.778	28	–	7	.800
St. John's	12	–	6	.667	19	–	11	.633
Syracuse	10	–	8	.556	20	–	9	.690
Connecticut	9	–	9	.500	15	–	13	.536
Providence	9	–	9	.500	20	–	13	.606
Pittsburgh	9	–	9	.500	17	–	11	.607
Boston College	9	–	9	.500	18	–	13	.581
Georgetown	8	–	10	.444	20	–	13	.606
Miami	7	–	11	.389	10	–	17	.370
Villanova	3	–	15	.167	8	–	19	.296
† 1993 Big East tournament winner As of April 5, 1993; Rankings from AP Poll

The 1993 Big East men's basketball tournament took place at Madison Square Garden in New York City, from March 11 to March 14, 1993. Its winner received the Big East Conference's automatic bid to the 1993 NCAA tournament. It is a single-elimination tournament with four rounds. Seton Hall finished with the best regular season conference and was awarded the #1 seed.

In the largest margin of victory in a Big East tournament championship game, Seton Hall defeated Syracuse, 103–70, to claim its second Big East tournament championship.

== Bracket ==
First round March 11, 1993
8	Georgetown	67
9	Miami	40
7	Boston College	74^{OT}
10	Villanova	70

Quarterfinals; March 12, 1993
1	#9 Seton Hall	83
8	Georgetown	69
4	Connecticut	55
5	Providence	73
3	Syracuse	55
6	Pittsburgh	50
2	St. John's	76
7	Boston College	56

Semifinals; March 13, 1993
1	#9 Seton Hall	69
5	Providence	60
3	Syracuse	84
2	St. John's	72

Championship Game; March 14, 1993
1	#9 Seton Hall	103
3	Syracuse	70

== Awards ==
Dave Gavitt Trophy (Most Valuable Player): Terry Dehere, Seton Hall

All Tournament Team

- Adrian Autry, Syracuse
- David Cain, St. John's
- Terry Dehere, Seton Hall
- Arturas Karnishovas, Seton Hall
- Lawrence Moten, Syracuse
- Dickey Simpkins, Providence
- Jerry Walker, Seton Hall
