= Luther Wright =

American basketball player (born 1971)

Personal information
- Born: September 22, 1971 (age 55) Jersey City, New Jersey, U.S.
- Listed height: 7 ft 2 in (2.18 m)
- Listed weight: 270 lb (122 kg)

Career information
- High school: Elizabeth (Elizabeth, New Jersey)
- College: Seton Hall (1990–1993)
- NBA draft: 1993: 1st round, 18th overall pick
- Drafted by: Utah Jazz
- Playing career: 1993–1994
- Position: Center
- Number: 44

Career history
- 1993–1994: Utah Jazz

Career highlights
- McDonald's All-American (1990); Second-team Parade All-American (1990)
- Stats at NBA.com
- Stats at Basketball Reference
Medals
Men's basketball
Representing United States
FIBA Americas U18 Championship
Gold medal – first place	1990 Montevideo	National team
Summer Universiade
Gold medal – first place	1991 Sheffield	National team

Luther A. Wright Jr. (born September 22, 1971) is an American former professional basketball player, in the center position.

== Basketball career ==
A native of Jersey City, New Jersey, Wright played high school ball for one season under coach Bob Hurley at powerhouse at St. Anthony High School before failing out and enrolling at Elizabeth High School in Elizabeth, New Jersey. He played two seasons of college basketball at Seton Hall University, averaging 9.0 points, 7.5 rebounds, and 2.2 blocked shots per game as a sophomore, before leaving school in 1993 to pursue professional basketball.

=== Professional ===
Wright was selected by the Utah Jazz in the 1st round (18th overall) of the 1993 NBA draft. Listed at 7'2" and 270 pounds in college, Wright arrived in Utah overweight and out-of-shape at 325 pounds. The Jazz were not short on size at that time, with Mark Eaton (7'4" and 290 pounds), Isaac Austin (6'10" and 290 pounds), and Felton Spencer (7'0" and 275 pounds) on the roster at center. Wright was seen as a project who the Jazz planned to develop slowly. However, poor play on the court, in addition to poor conditioning and mental health issues, limited Wright to only one season in the NBA. He averaged 1.3 points and 0.7 rebounds in 15 games.

== Personal problems ==
In January 1994, police found Wright at a highway rest area west of Salt Lake City, banging garbage cans and smashing in car windows.

After the season with the Jazz finished, he entered a mental institution. Still during his NBA stint, he was diagnosed with bipolar disorder and left the team. In 1996, he was released from Essex County Hospital Center, a psychiatric hospital, after a 30-day admission. Under the terms of his contract with the Jazz, Wright was to be paid US$153,000 per year for 25 full years. In his post-NBA time, he spent some time homeless.
