= Big East Conference Men's Basketball Coach of the Year =

Collegiate basketball coaching award

- Awarded for: the best coach in the Big East Conference
- Country: United States

History
- First award: 1980
- Most recent: Shaheen Holloway, Seton Hall

The Big East Conference Men's Basketball Coach of the Year award is given to the men's basketball coach in the Big East Conference voted as the best. It was first awarded at the end of the 1979–80 season, the inaugural season of the Big East.

== Key ==
†	Co-Coaches of the Year
*	Awarded a national Coach of the Year award: Associated Press College Basketball Coach of the Year (1966–67 to present); Naismith College Coach of the Year (1986–87 to present); Henry Iba Award (1958–59 to present); NABC Coach of the Year (1958–59 to present)
Coach (X)	Denotes the number of times the coach has been awarded the Big East Coach of the Year award at that point
Conf. W–L	Conference win–loss record for that season
Conf. St.^{T}	Conference standing at year's end (^{T}denotes a tie; BE6 stands for Big East 6 Division, BE7 for Big East 7 Division, E for Eastern Division, and W for Western Division)
Overall W–L	Overall win–loss record for that season

== Winners ==
Season	Coach	School	Conf. W–L	Conf. St.	Overall W–L
1979–80	John Thompson	Georgetown	5–1	1^{T}	26–6
1980–81	Tom Davis	Boston College	10–4	1	23–7
1981–82	Rollie Massimino	Villanova	11–3	1	24–8
1982–83	Lou Carnesecca	St. John's	12–4	1^{T}	28–5
1983–84	Jim Boeheim	Syracuse	12–4	2^{T}	23–9
1984–85	Lou Carnesecca (2)	St. John's	15–1	1	31–4
1985–86	Lou Carnesecca (3)	St. John's	14–2	1^{T}	31–5
1986–87	John Thompson (2)	Georgetown	12–4	1^{T}	29–5
1987–88	P. J. Carlesimo	Seton Hall	8–8	5^{T}	22–13
1988–89	P. J. Carlesimo (2)	Seton Hall	11–5	2	31–7
1989–90	Jim Calhoun	UConn	12–4	1^{T}	31–6
1990–91	Jim Boeheim (2)	Syracuse	12–4	1	26–6
1991–92	John Thompson (3)	Georgetown	12–6	1^{T}	22–10
1992–93	Brian Mahoney	St. John's	12–6	2	19–11
1993–94	Jim Calhoun (2)	UConn	16–2	1	29–5
1994–95	Leonard Hamilton	Miami (FL)	9–9	5	15–13
1995–96^{†}	Jim Calhoun (3)	UConn	17–1	1 (BE6)	32–3
1995–96^{†}	Jim O'Brien	Boston College	10–8	3 (BE6)	19–11
1996–97	John MacLeod	Notre Dame	8–10	4 (BE6)	16–14
1997–98	Jim Calhoun (4)	UConn	15–3	1 (BE6)	32–5
1998–99	Leonard Hamilton (2)	Miami (FL)	15–3	2	23–7
1999–00	Jim Boeheim (3)	Syracuse	13–3	1^{T}	26–6
2000–01	Al Skinner	Boston College	13–3	1 (E)	27–5
2001–02	Ben Howland	Pittsburgh	13–3	1 (W)	29–6
2002–03	Louis Orr	Seton Hall	10–6	2^{T} (W)	17–13
2003–04	Jamie Dixon	Pittsburgh	13–3	1	31–5
2004–05	Al Skinner (2)	Boston College	13–3	1^{T}	25–5
2005–06	Jay Wright	Villanova	14–2	1^{T}	28–5
2006–07	Mike Brey	Notre Dame	11–5	4	24–8
2007–08	Mike Brey (2)	Notre Dame	14–4	2^{T}	25–8
2008–09	Jay Wright (2)	Villanova	13–5	4	30–8
2009–10	Jim Boeheim (4)	Syracuse	15–3	1	30–5
2010–11	Mike Brey (3)	Notre Dame	14–4	2	27–7
2011–12	Stan Heath	South Florida	12–6	6	22–14
2012–13	John Thompson III	Georgetown	14–4	1^{T}	25–7
2013–14	Jay Wright (3)	Villanova	16–2	1	29–5
2014–15	Jay Wright (4)	Villanova	16–2	1	33–3
2015–16^{†}	Kevin Willard	Seton Hall	12–6	3	25–9
2015–16^{†}	Jay Wright (5)	Villanova	16–2	1	35–5
2016–17	Chris Holtmann	Butler	12–6	2	25–9
2017–18	Chris Mack	Xavier	15–3	1	29–6
2018–19	Jay Wright (6)	Villanova	13–5	1	26–10
2019–20	Greg McDermott	Creighton	13–5	1^{T}	24–7
2020–21	Mike Anderson	St. John's	10–9	4^{T}	16–10
2021–22	Ed Cooley	Providence	14–3	1	27–6
2022–23	Shaka Smart	Marquette	17–3	1	28–6
2023–24	Dan Hurley	UConn	18–2	1	37–3
2024–25	Rick Pitino	St. John's	18–2	1	31–5
2025–26	Shaheen Holloway	Seton Hall	10–10	4	TBD

== See also ==
- Big East Conference (1979–2013)
- Big East men's basketball tournament
- Associated Press College Basketball Coach of the Year
- Henry Iba Award
- NABC Coach of the Year
- Naismith College Coach of the Year
