= Terry Dehere =

American basketball player (born 1971)

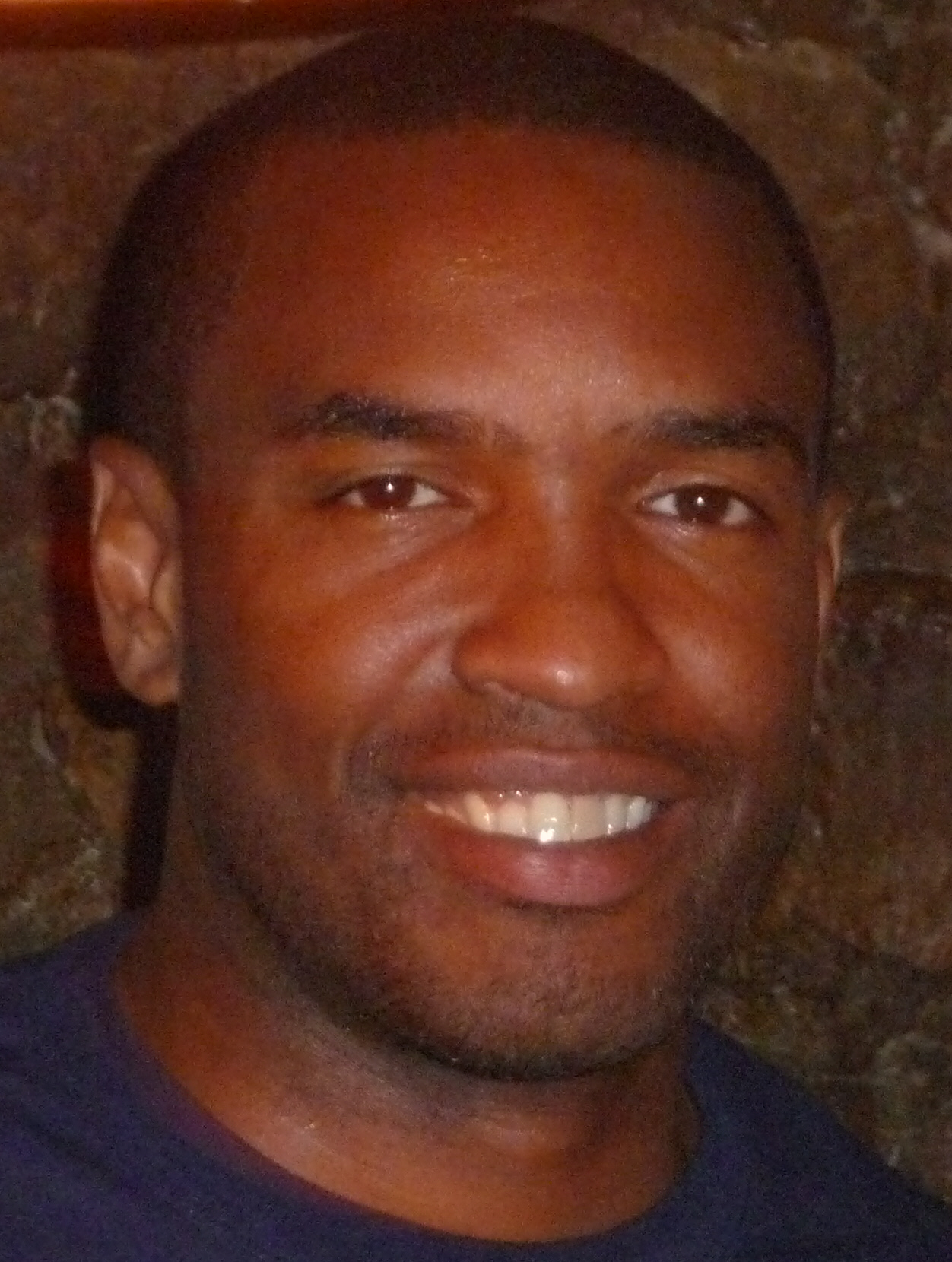

Personal information
- Born: September 12, 1971 (age 55) New York City, New York, U.S.
- Listed height: 6 ft 4 in (1.93 m)
- Listed weight: 190 lb (86 kg)

Career information
- High school: St. Anthony (Jersey City, New Jersey)
- College: Seton Hall (1989–1993)
- NBA draft: 1993: 1st round, 13th overall pick
- Drafted by: Los Angeles Clippers
- Playing career: 1993–2002
- Position: Point guard / shooting guard
- Number: 24

Career history
- 1993–1997: Los Angeles Clippers
- 1997–1999: Sacramento Kings
- 1999: Vancouver Grizzlies
- 1999–2000: Alba Berlin
- 2002: North Charleston Lowgators

Career highlights
- Consensus second-team All-American (1993); Big East Player of the Year (1993); 3× First-team All-Big East (1991–1993); No. 24 retired by Seton Hall Pirates

Career NBA statistics
- Points: 3,235 (8.0 ppg)
- Rebounds: 588 (1.5 rpg)
- Assists: 1,034 (2.6 apg)
- Stats at NBA.com
- Stats at Basketball Reference
Medals
Men's basketball
Representing United States
Pan American Games
Bronze medal – third place	1991 Havana	Team competition
FIBA Americas U18 Championship
Gold medal – first place	1990 Montevideo	Team competition

Lennox Dominique "Terry" Dehere (born September 12, 1971) is an American former basketball player who played six seasons in the National Basketball Association (NBA) and was an All-American college player at Seton Hall University. Following his playing career, Dehere became active in Democratic Party politics, as well as a restaurateur.

Dehere was born in New York City, and grew up in Jersey City, New Jersey, and played basketball under Coach Bob Hurley while attending St. Anthony High School in Jersey City, New Jersey. It is through this relationship that he is best friends with the coach's son, Bobby Hurley.

== College career ==
Dehere played for Seton Hall from 1989 until 1993, where he had held the school and conference record with 2,494 career points, as well as school career records for 3-point field goals made and 3-point field goals attempted. Dehere also holds single season records for 3-point field goals made and 3-point field goal percentage. He was named Big East Player of the Year in the 1992–93 season, as well as Conference Tournament MVP.

== Professional career ==
A 6'2", 190-lb. guard, he was selected 13th overall by the Los Angeles Clippers in the 1993 NBA draft. He played for the Clippers, Sacramento Kings and Vancouver Grizzlies averaging 8.0 ppg during his NBA career which spanned six seasons. Dehere also played two seasons in Germany. In January 2002, Dehere signed with the Florida Flame of the National Basketball Development League (NBDL).

== Community involvement ==
In 1994, Dehere donated $75,000 to rehabilitate the Garfield Park basketball court where he had played in his youth. He also worked with others in the community to rebuild the youth recreational basketball program at the park. The court was renamed by the City of Jersey City in Dehere's honor. After retiring from the NBA, Dehere returned to his hometown of Jersey City. He was the owner of Sanai's at the Newkirk-Summit House, a restaurant in the oldest standing building in the city. He is also the Chairman of the Jersey City Community Housing Corporation, a non-profit corporation involved in the construction of affordable housing.

== Politics ==
Dehere made his political debut as a candidate for an at-large council seat in the Jersey City municipal election of 2001.

On April 27, 2007, Dehere was elected to serve as a member of the Jersey City Board of Education where he served on the Legal and Affirmative Action Committees. He became vice president of the board on May 21, 2009. He served one term, which expired in April 2010, and was defeated for reelection.

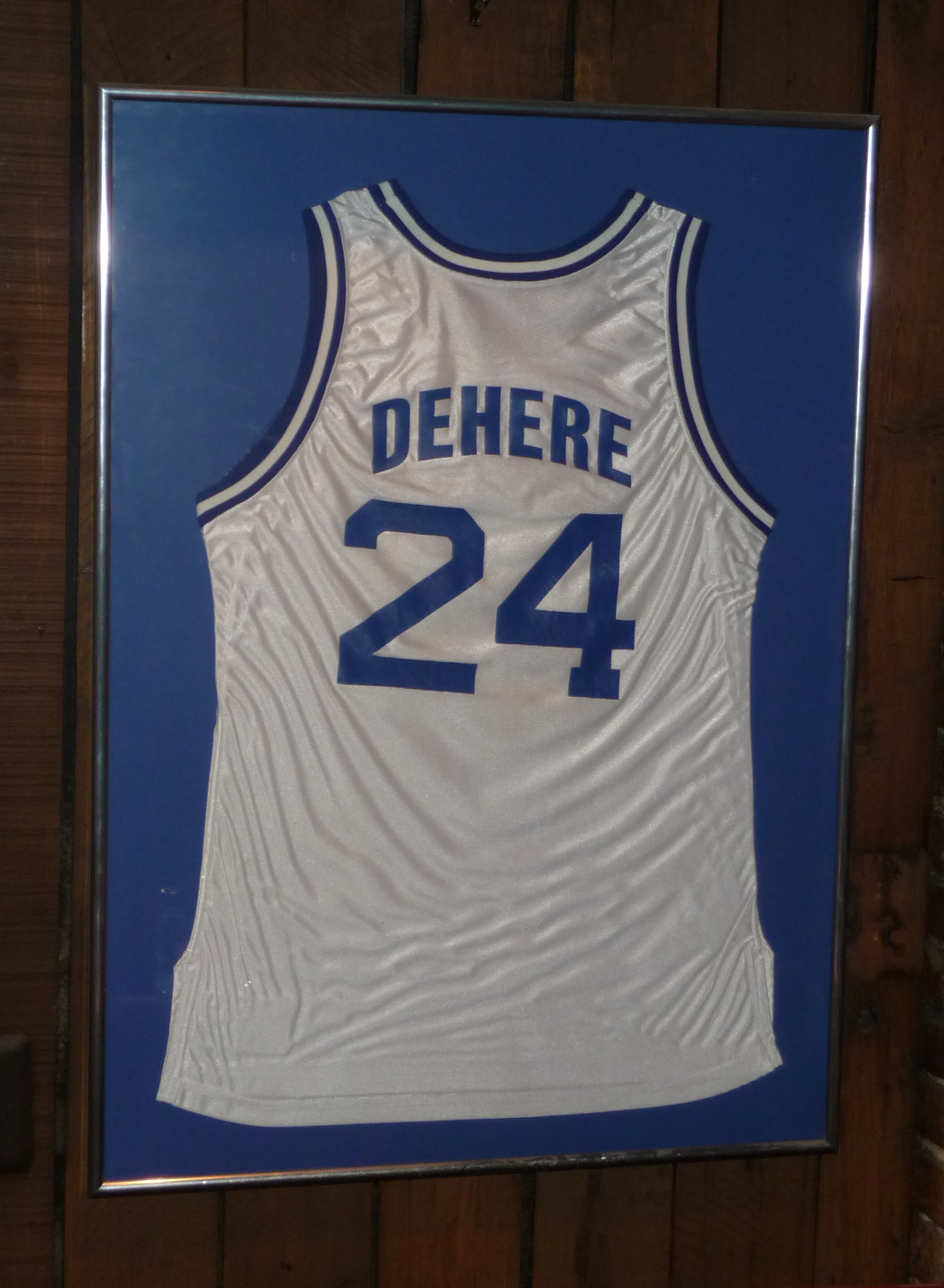
Dehere's Seton Hall jersey displayed in his Jersey City restaurant
