= Marcus Liberty =

American basketball player (born 1968)

Personal information
- Born: October 27, 1968 (age 58) Chicago, Illinois, U.S.
- Listed height: 6 ft 8 in (2.03 m)
- Listed weight: 205 lb (93 kg)

Career information
- High school: King College Prep (Chicago, Illinois)
- College: Illinois (1988–1990)
- NBA draft: 1990: 2nd round, 42nd overall pick
- Drafted by: Denver Nuggets
- Playing career: 1990–2002
- Position: Small forward
- Number: 30

Career history
- 1990–1993: Denver Nuggets
- 1993–1994: Detroit Pistons
- 1994–1995: Rapid City Thrillers
- 1995–1996: AEK Athens
- 1996–1997: Ortaköy Spor Kulübü
- 1997: Cariduros de Fajardo
- 1997–1998: Jämtland Ambassadors Östersund
- 1998: Polluelos de Aibonito
- 1998–1999: Zexel Bosch Blue Winds
- 1999–2000: Las Vegas Silver Bandits
- 2000: Alaska Aces
- 2000–2001: South Dakota Gold
- 2001: Potros de Villa Francisca
- 2001–2002: Español de Talca

Career highlights
- USA Today High School Player of the Year (1987); 2× First-team Parade All-American (1986, 1987); Illinois Mr. Basketball (1987); McDonald's All-American (1987)

Career NBA statistics
- Points: 1,942 (7.3 ppg)
- Rebounds: 925 (3.5 rpg)
- Stats at NBA.com
- Stats at Basketball Reference

Marcus Liberty (born October 27, 1968) is an American former professional basketball player. He played four seasons in the National Basketball Association (NBA). Liberty played college basketball for the University of Illinois.

== High school ==
After leading Chicago's Crane High School Cougars to a city title as a freshman, Liberty transferred to Chicago's King College Prep High School for his sophomore through senior seasons from 1984 to 1987. During his time at King, Liberty led his basketball teams to an IHSA State Championship in 1986 and a second-place finish in 1987. During the 1987 tournament run, Liberty scored 41, 23, 38 and 41 points consecutively. His 143-point effort during that tournament stands as a class AA record in the state of Illinois. He was named a McDonald's All-American in 1987, as well as the Parade Player of the Year.

In 2007, Liberty was voted one of the "100 Legends of the IHSA Boys Basketball Tournament," recognizing his superior performance in his appearances in the tournament. He was considered the top senior prep player in the nation by Sports Illustrated.

== College and NBA ==
Liberty played collegiately at the University of Illinois, and was a member of the team that advanced to the 1989 NCAA Final Four. That Fighting Illini team gained the moniker "Flyin' Illini" by Dick Vitale while broadcasting a game during the 1988–89 season. Along with Liberty, the other members of that team included Nick Anderson, Kendall Gill, Stephen Bardo, Kenny Battle, and Lowell Hamilton. He was then selected by the Denver Nuggets in the 2nd round (42nd overall) of the 1990 NBA draft. A 6-foot-8-inch (2.03 m), 205-pound (93 kg) small forward, Liberty played for the Nuggets and Detroit Pistons in 4 NBA seasons. His best year as a pro was during the 1991-92 NBA season when he appeared in 75 games for the Nuggets, averaging 9.3 ppg.

Awards and achievements
Preceded by Nick Anderson	Illinois Mr. Basketball Award Winner; 1987	Succeeded by Eric Anderson
