= 1988–89 Wisconsin Badgers men's basketball team =

American college basketball season

1988–89 Wisconsin Badgers men's basketball

National Invitation Tournament, Second Round
- Conference: Big Ten Conference
- Record: 18–12 (8–10 Big Ten)
- Head coach: Steve Yoder (7th season)
- Home arena: Wisconsin Field House

1988–89 Big Ten Conference men's basketball standings
	Conf.				Overall
Team	W		L	PCT	W		L	PCT
No. 8 Indiana	15	–	3	.833	27	–	8	.771
No. 3 Illinois	14	–	4	.778	31	–	5	.861
No. 10 Michigan	12	–	6	.667	30	–	7	.811
No. 14 Iowa	10	–	8	.556	23	–	10	.697
Minnesota	9	–	9	.500	19	–	12	.613
Wisconsin	8	–	10	.444	18	–	12	.600
Purdue	8	–	10	.444	15	–	16	.484
Ohio State	6	–	12	.333	19	–	15	.559
Michigan State	6	–	12	.333	18	–	15	.545
Northwestern	2	–	16	.111	9	–	19	.321
Rankings from AP Poll

The 1988–89 Wisconsin Badgers men's basketball team represented the University of Wisconsin as a member of the Big Ten Conference during the 1988–89 NCAA Division I men's basketball season. The team was coached by Steve Yoder, coaching his seventh season with Wisconsin. The Badgers finished 18–12, 8–10 in Big Ten play to finish tied for sixth place.

== Roster ==
1988–89 Wisconsin Badgers men's basketball team
Players
Coaches

Pos.	#	Name	Height	Weight	Year	Hometown
G	10	Billy Douglass	6 ft 5 in (1.96 m)	185 lb (84 kg)	RS Fr	Lake Forest, Illinois
G	12	Brian Good	6 ft 1 in (1.85 m)	180 lb (82 kg)	Fr	Rossville, Indiana
G	20	Byron Robinson	6 ft 5 in (1.96 m)	185 lb (84 kg)	RS So	Springfield, Illinois
G	21	James Gillespie	6 ft 4 in (1.93 m)	190 lb (86 kg)	Jr	Detroit, Michigan
G	22	Pollis Robertson	6 ft 7 in (2.01 m)	220 lb (100 kg)	Sr	Wayne, Michigan
F	23	Willie Simms	6 ft 5 in (1.96 m)	185 lb (84 kg)	So	Pontiac, Michigan
G/F	30	Tom Molaski (C)	6 ft 6 in (1.98 m)	195 lb (88 kg)	Sr	Grafton, Wisconsin
G	32	Trent Jackson (C)	6 ft 1 in (1.85 m)	178 lb (81 kg)	Sr	Bolingbrook, Illinois
F	40	John Ellenson (I*)	6 ft 7 in (2.01 m)	210 lb (95 kg)	So	Menomonie, Wisconsin
F	41	Rob Willey	6 ft 9 in (2.06 m)	220 lb (100 kg)	RS Jr	Neenah, Wisconsin
F	43	Patrick Tompkins (I^)	6 ft 6 in (1.98 m)	245 lb (111 kg)	So	Waukegan, Illinois
G	44	Tim Locum	6 ft 4 in (1.93 m)	175 lb (79 kg)	So	Flora, Illinois
F	50	Danny Jones (C)	6 ft 6 in (1.98 m)	240 lb (109 kg)	Jr	Rockford, Illinois
C	52	Darin Schubring	6 ft 10 in (2.08 m)	240 lb (109 kg)	Sr	Baraboo, Wisconsin
F	53	Kurt Portmann	6 ft 11 in (2.11 m)	225 lb (102 kg)	Jr	Sheboygan, Wisconsin
F/C	55	Greg Sipla (W)	6 ft 10 in (2.08 m)	225 lb (102 kg)	RS Jr	Racine, Wisconsin

Head coach

- Steve Yoder (Illinois Wesleyan)

Assistant coach(es)

- Brad McNulty (Purdue)
- Ray McCallum (Ball State)
- Rod Zentner (UW-La Crosse)

Legend

- (C) Team captain
- (S) Suspended
- (I) Ineligible
- (W) Walk-on
- Injured
- Current redshirt

*ineligible first semester due to transfer from Marquette ^academically ineligible second semester

== Schedule ==
Date time, TV	Rank^{#}	Opponent^{#}	Result	Record	Site city, state
Regular Season
11/26/1988*		Oregon	W 74–47	1–0	UW Fieldhouse; Madison, WI
11/28/1988*		Ferris State	W 98–61	2–0	UW Fieldhouse; Madison, WI
12/2/1988*		vs. Maine; First Bank Classic	W 89–72	3–0	Bradley Center; Milwaukee, WI
12/3/1988*		vs. Marquette; First Bank Classic	W 70–55	4–0	Bradley Center; Milwaukee, WI
12/5/1988*		Eastern Illinois	W 52–44	5–0	UW Fieldhouse; Madison, WI
12/7/1988*		at Loyola (IL)	L 76–90	5–1	Alumni Gym; Chicago, IL
12/10/1988*		at Butler	W 63–53	6–1	Hinkle Fieldhouse; Indianapolis, IN
12/14/1988*		Denver	W 89–34	7–1	UW Fieldhouse; Madison, WI
12/30/1988*		Eastern Michigan	W 84–69	8–1	UW Fieldhouse; Madison, WI
1/4/1989		Minnesota	W 75–67	9–1 (1–0)	UW Fieldhouse; Madison, WI
1/7/1989		at No. 14 Ohio State	L 70–73	9–2 (1–1)	St. John Arena; Columbus, OH
1/12/1989		at No. 2 Illinois	L 80–103	9–3 (1–2)	Assembly Hall; Champaign, IL
1/14/1989		Purdue	L 62–68	9–4 (1–3)	UW Fieldhouse; Madison, WI
1/19/1989		No. 19 Indiana	L 58–61 ^{OT}	9–5 (1–4)	UW Fieldhouse; Madison, WI
1/21/1989		No. 6 Michigan	W 71–68	10–5 (2–4)	UW Fieldhouse; Madison, WI
1/26/1989		at No. 12 Iowa	L 70–78	10–6 (2–5)	Carver–Hawkeye Arena; Iowa City, IA
1/28/1989		at Northwestern	W 59–58	11–6 (3–5)	Welsh–Ryan Arena; Evanston, IL
2/2/1989		Michigan State	W 69–64 ^{OT}	12–6 (4–5)	UW Fieldhouse; Madison, WI
2/8/1989		at Minnesota	L 58–59	12–7 (4–6)	Williams Arena; Minneapolis, MN
2/11/1989		at No. 8 Iowa	W 65–54	13–7 (5–6)	UW Fieldhouse; Madison, WI
2/15/1989		Northwestern	W 72–60	14–7 (6–6)	UW Fieldhouse; Madison, WI
2/18/1989		No. 5 Illinois	W 72–52	15–7 (7–6)	UW Fieldhouse; Madison, WI
2/22/1989*		Marquette	W 61–50	16–7	UW Fieldhouse; Madison, WI
2/25/1989		at No. 13 Michigan	L 70–92	16–8 (7–7)	Crisler Arena; Ann Arbor, MI
3/2/1989		at Purdue	L 60–65	16–9 (7–8)	Mackey Arena; West Lafayette, IN
3/4/1989		Ohio State	W 77–65	17–9 (8–8)	UW Fieldhouse; Madison, WI
3/9/1989		at No. 6 Indiana	L 64–75	17–10 (8–9)	Assembly Hall; Bloomington, IN
3/11/1989		at Michigan State	L 61–70	17–11 (8–10)	Breslin Center; East Lansing, MI
National Invitation Tournament
3/15/1989*		New Orleans; First Round	W 63–61	18–11	UW Fieldhouse; Madison, WI
3/20/1989*		Saint Louis; Second Round	L 68–73	18–12	UW Fieldhouse; Madison, WI
*Non-conference game. ^{#}Rankings from AP Poll. (#) Tournament seedings in parentheses.

== Player statistics ==
Individual player statistics (Final)
			Minutes		Scoring		Total FGs			3-point FGs			Free Throws			Rebounds								
Player	GP	GS	Tot	Avg	Pts	Avg	FG	FGA	Pct	3FG	3FA	Pct	FT	FTA	Pct	Off	Def	Tot	Avg	A	TO	Blk	Stl	PF
Jones, Danny	30	30	1062	35.4	611	20.4	231	449	.514	0	2	.000	149	199	.749	-	-	141	4.7	35	65	12	26	91
Jackson, Trent	30	30	1099	36.6	574	19.1	201	408	.493	73	163	.448	99	133	.744	-	-	90	3.0	101	91	1	50	79
Locum, Tim	30	6	733	24.4	265	8.8	83	168	.494	54	111	.486	45	55	.818	-	-	71	2.4	60	29	3	25	52
Simms, Willie	30	24	627	20.9	190	6.3	84	162	.519	1	2	.500	21	53	.396	-	-	99	3.3	52	49	12	27	64
Tompkins, Patrick	12	5	214	17.8	63	5.3	23	35	.657	0	1	.000	17	33	.515	-	-	46	3.8	10	15	8	2	14
Molaski, Tom	30	22	830	27.7	150	5.0	48	107	.449	13	39	.333	41	54	.759	-	-	83	2.8	108	54	2	40	60
Portmann, Kurt	30	24	689	23.0	135	4.5	63	113	.558	0	0	.000	9	18	.500	-	-	112	3.7	42	32	34	26	93
Gillespie, James	6	0	33	5.5	14	2.3	6	9	.667	0	0	.000	2	7	.286	-	-	8	1.3	4	3	1	2	4
Good, Brian	9	0	34	3.8	15	1.7	3	12	.250	3	5	.600	6	7	.857	-	-	2	0.2	1	6	0	1	1
Schubring, Darin	29	9	465	16.0	45	1.6	19	47	.404	0	0	.000	7	21	.333	-	-	102	3.5	11	22	9	8	61
Ellenson, John	9	0	60	6.7	11	1.2	4	8	.500	2	2	1.000	1	2	.500	-	-	9	1.0	4	6	1	1	8
Willey, Rob	9	0	27	3.0	8	0.9	4	8	.500	0	0	.000	0	0	.000	-	-	5	0.6	0	7	3	3	4
Robertson, Pollis	11	0	32	2.9	7	0.6	2	7	.286	0	0	.000	3	5	.600	-	-	8	0.7	0	3	0	0	1
Robinson, Byron	16	0	91	5.7	6	0.4	0	5	.000	0	0	.000	6	13	.462	-	-	15	0.9	17	9	0	7	4
Douglass, Billy	14	0	54	3.9	6	0.4	3	8	.375	0	1	.000	0	6	.000	-	-	8	0.6	5	6	0	2	5
Total	30	-	6050	40.3	2100	70.0	774	1546	.501	146	326	.448	406	606	.670	-	-	859	28.6	450	401	86	220	541
Opponents	30	-	6050	40.3	1941	64.7	699	1503	.465	105	267	.393	438	606	.723	-	-	885	29.5	367	470	71	162	583

Legend
GP	Games played	GS	Games started	Tot	Total count	Avg	Average per game	Pts	Points
FG	Field goals made	FGA	Field goal attempts	3FG	3-pointers made	3FA	3-point attempts	FT	Free throws made
FTA	Free throw attempts	Off	Offensive rebounds	Def	Defensive rebounds	A	Assists	TO	Turnovers
Blk	Blocks	Stl	Steals	PF	Personal fouls	Team high

== Awards and honors ==
All-American

- Danny Jones - Honorable Mention (AP)

All-Big Ten

- Danny Jones - 2nd team (AP and UPI)
- Trent Jackson - 2nd team (AP), 3rd team (UPI)

Big Ten Player of the Week

- Trent Jackson - Week of February 14

Team awards

- Trent Jackson - MVP
- Willie Simms - Most Improved
- Darin Schubring - Defensive POY
