= 1989 NCAA Division I men's basketball tournament =

Edition of USA college basketball tournament

- Season: 1988–89
- Teams: 64
- Finals site: Kingdome, Seattle, Washington
- Champions: Michigan Wolverines (1st title, 3rd title game, 4th Final Four)
- Runner-up: Seton Hall Pirates (1st title game, 1st Final Four)
- Semifinalists: Duke Blue Devils (7th Final Four); Illinois Fighting Illini (4th Final Four)
- Winning coach: Steve Fisher (1st title)
- MOP: Glen Rice (Michigan)
- Attendance: 613,242
- Top scorer: Glen Rice (Michigan) (184 points)

The 1989 NCAA Division I men's basketball tournament involved 64 schools playing in single-elimination play to determine the national champion of men's NCAA Division I college basketball. The 51st annual edition of the tournament began on March 16, 1989, and ended with the championship game on April 3 at the Kingdome in Seattle. A total of 63 games were played.

Michigan, coached by Steve Fisher, won the national title with an 80–79 overtime victory in the final game over Seton Hall, coached by P. J. Carlesimo. Glen Rice of Michigan set an NCAA tournament record by scoring 184 points in six games and was named the tournament's Most Outstanding Player. This was Michigan's last national championship until 2026.

Just prior to the start of this tournament, Michigan coach Bill Frieder had announced that he would accept the head coaching position at Arizona State University at the end of the season. Michigan athletic director Bo Schembechler promptly fired Frieder and appointed top assistant Fisher as interim coach, stating famously, that "a Michigan man is going to coach a Michigan team."

Two 16-seeded teams came within one point of victory in the first round (Georgetown vs. Princeton, Oklahoma vs. East Tennessee State), and a third came within six points. This tournament was also unusual in that all four 11-seeds advanced out of the first round.

The 1989 Tournament was the second one since 1980, with 1987 being the first, in which the defending national champion did not participate in the tournament. Kansas, winner of the 1988 NCAA title, had been placed on probation for violations committed by former coach Larry Brown and was barred from the tournament. Brown left Kansas immediately after winning the national championship to return to coaching in the NBA with the San Antonio Spurs, leaving first-year coach Roy Williams to coach the team. It is the only time the Jayhawks have missed the NCAA tournament from 1984 to the present day. The defending champion would not be left out of the next year's tournament again until 2008. The tournament was notable for the poor performance of the SEC. After traditional stalwart Kentucky missed the postseason after experiencing its first losing season since 1927, none of the five SEC teams won a game in the tournament.

== Schedule and venues ==
1989 first and second rounds
1989 Regionals (blue) and Final Four (red)

The following are the sites that were selected to host each round of the 1989 tournament, and their hosts:

First and Second Rounds

- March 16 and 18
  - East Region
    - Greensboro Coliseum, Greensboro, North Carolina (Host: Atlantic Coast Conference)
  - Midwest Region
    - Hoosier Dome, Indianapolis, Indiana (Hosts: Butler University, Midwestern Collegiate Conference)
  - Southeast Region
    - Memorial Gymnasium, Nashville, Tennessee (Host: Vanderbilt University)
  - West Region
    - BSU Pavilion, Boise, Idaho (Host: Boise State University)
- March 17 and 19
  - East Region
    - Providence Civic Center, Providence, Rhode Island (Host: Providence College)
  - Midwest Region
    - Reunion Arena, Dallas, Texas (Host: Southwest Conference)
  - Southeast Region
    - Omni Coliseum, Atlanta, Georgia (Host: Georgia Tech)
  - West Region
    - McKale Center, Tucson, Arizona (Host: University of Arizona)

Regional semifinals and finals (Sweet Sixteen and Elite Eight)

- March 23 and 25
  - Southeast Regional, Rupp Arena, Lexington, Kentucky (Host: University of Kentucky)
  - West Regional, McNichols Sports Arena, Denver, Colorado (Hosts: University of Colorado Boulder, Big 8 Conference)
- March 24 and 26
  - East Regional, Brendan Byrne Arena, East Rutherford, New Jersey (Hosts: Seton Hall University, Big East Conference)
  - Midwest Regional, Hubert H. Humphrey Metrodome, Minneapolis, Minnesota (Host: University of Minnesota)

National semifinals and championship (Final Four and championship)

- April 1 and 3
  - Kingdome, Seattle, Washington (Host: University of Washington)

== Teams ==
| Region | Seed | Team | Coach | Conference | Finished | Final Opponent | Score |
|---|---|---|---|---|---|---|---|
| East | 1 | Georgetown | John Thompson | Big East | Elite Eight | 2 Duke | L 85–77 |
| East | 2 | Duke | Mike Krzyzewski | Atlantic Coast | Final Four | 3 Seton Hall | L 95–78 |
| East | 3 | Stanford | Mike Montgomery | Pacific-10 | Round of 64 | 14 Siena | L 80–78 |
| East | 4 | Iowa | Tom Davis | Big Ten | Round of 32 | 5 NC State | L 102–96 |
| East | 5 | NC State | Jim Valvano | Atlantic Coast | Sweet Sixteen | 1 Georgetown | L 69–61 |
| East | 6 | Kansas State | Lon Kruger | Big Eight | Round of 64 | 11 Minnesota | L 86–75 |
| East | 7 | West Virginia | Gale Catlett | Atlantic 10 | Round of 32 | 2 Duke | L 70–63 |
| East | 8 | Vanderbilt | C. M. Newton | Southeastern | Round of 64 | 9 Notre Dame | L 81–65 |
| East | 9 | Notre Dame | Digger Phelps | Independent | Round of 32 | 1 Georgetown | L 81–74 |
| East | 10 | Tennessee | Don DeVoe | Southeastern | Round of 64 | 7 West Virginia | L 84–68 |
| East | 11 | Minnesota | Clem Haskins | Big Ten | Sweet Sixteen | 2 Duke | L 87–70 |
| East | 12 | South Carolina | George Felton | Metro | Round of 64 | 5 NC State | L 81–66 |
| East | 13 | Rutgers | Bob Wenzel | Atlantic 10 | Round of 64 | 4 Iowa | L 87–73 |
| East | 14 | Siena | Mike Deane | North Atlantic | Round of 32 | 11 Minnesota | L 80–67 |
| East | 15 | South Carolina State | Cy Alexander | Mid-Eastern | Round of 64 | 2 Duke | L 90–69 |
| East | 16 | Princeton | Pete Carril | Ivy League | Round of 64 | 1 Georgetown | L 50–49 |
| Region | Seed | Team | Coach | Conference | Finished | Final Opponent | Score |
| Midwest | 1 | Illinois | Lou Henson | Big Ten | Final Four | 3 Michigan | L 83–81 |
| Midwest | 2 | Syracuse | Jim Boeheim | Big East | Elite Eight | 1 Illinois | L 89–86 |
| Midwest | 3 | Missouri | Norm Stewart | Big Eight | Sweet Sixteen | 2 Syracuse | L 83–80 |
| Midwest | 4 | Louisville | Denny Crum | Metro | Sweet Sixteen | 1 Illinois | L 83–69 |
| Midwest | 5 | Arkansas | Nolan Richardson | Southwest | Round of 32 | 4 Louisville | L 93–84 |
| Midwest | 6 | Georgia Tech | Bobby Cremins | Atlantic Coast | Round of 64 | 11 Texas | L 76–70 |
| Midwest | 7 | Florida | Norm Sloan | Southeastern | Round of 64 | 10 Colorado State | L 68–46 |
| Midwest | 8 | Pittsburgh | Paul Evans | Big East | Round of 64 | 9 Ball State | L 68–64 |
| Midwest | 9 | Ball State | Rick Majerus | Mid-American | Round of 32 | 1 Illinois | L 72–60 |
| Midwest | 10 | Colorado State | Boyd Grant | Western Athletic | Round of 32 | 2 Syracuse | L 65–50 |
| Midwest | 11 | Texas | Tom Penders | Southwest | Round of 32 | 3 Missouri | L 108–89 |
| Midwest | 12 | Loyola Marymount | Paul Westhead | West Coast | Round of 64 | 5 Arkansas | L 120–101 |
| Midwest | 13 | Arkansas–Little Rock | Mike Newell | Trans America | Round of 64 | 4 Louisville | L 76–71 |
| Midwest | 14 | Creighton | Tony Barone | Missouri Valley | Round of 64 | 3 Missouri | L 85–69 |
| Midwest | 15 | Bucknell | Charlie Woollum | East Coast | Round of 64 | 2 Syracuse | L 104–81 |
| Midwest | 16 | McNeese State | Steve Welch | Southland | Round of 64 | 1 Illinois | L 77–71 |
| Region | Seed | Team | Coach | Conference | Finished | Final Opponent | Score |
| Southeast | 1 | Oklahoma | Billy Tubbs | Big Eight | Sweet Sixteen | 5 Virginia | L 86–80 |
| Southeast | 2 | North Carolina | Dean Smith | Atlantic Coast | Sweet Sixteen | 3 Michigan | L 92–87 |
| Southeast | 3 | Michigan | Steve Fisher | Big Ten | Champion | 3 Seton Hall | W 80–79 |
| Southeast | 4 | Florida State | Pat Kennedy | Metro | Round of 64 | 13 Middle Tennessee | L 97–83 |
| Southeast | 5 | Virginia | Terry Holland | Atlantic Coast | Elite Eight | 3 Michigan | L 102–65 |
| Southeast | 6 | Alabama | Wimp Sanderson | Southeastern | Round of 64 | 11 South Alabama | L 86–84 |
| Southeast | 7 | UCLA | Jim Harrick | Pacific-10 | Round of 32 | 2 North Carolina | L 88–81 |
| Southeast | 8 | La Salle | Speedy Morris | Metro Atlantic | Round of 64 | 9 Louisiana Tech | L 83–74 |
| Southeast | 9 | Louisiana Tech | Tommy Joe Eagles | American South | Round of 32 | 1 Oklahoma | L 124–81 |
| Southeast | 10 | Iowa State | Johnny Orr | Big Eight | Round of 64 | 7 UCLA | L 84–74 |
| Southeast | 11 | South Alabama | Ronnie Arrow | Sun Belt | Round of 32 | 3 Michigan | L 91–82 |
| Southeast | 12 | Providence | Rick Barnes | Big East | Round of 64 | 5 Virginia | L 100–97 |
| Southeast | 13 | Middle Tennessee | Bruce Stewart | Ohio Valley | Round of 32 | 5 Virginia | L 104–88 |
| Southeast | 14 | Xavier | Pete Gillen | Midwestern | Round of 64 | 3 Michigan | L 92–87 |
| Southeast | 15 | Southern | Ben Jobe | Southwest Athletic | Round of 64 | 2 North Carolina | L 93–79 |
| Southeast | 16 | East Tennessee State | Les Robinson | Southern | Round of 64 | 1 Oklahoma | L 72–71 |
| Region | Seed | Team | Coach | Conference | Finished | Final Opponent | Score |
| West | 1 | Arizona | Lute Olson | Pacific-10 | Sweet Sixteen | 4 UNLV | L 68–67 |
| West | 2 | Indiana | Bob Knight | Big Ten | Sweet Sixteen | 3 Seton Hall | L 78–65 |
| West | 3 | Seton Hall | P. J. Carlesimo | Big East | Runner Up | 3 Michigan | L 80–79 |
| West | 4 | UNLV | Jerry Tarkanian | Big West | Elite Eight | 3 Seton Hall | L 84–61 |
| West | 5 | Memphis State | Larry Finch | Metro | Round of 64 | 12 DePaul | L 66–63 |
| West | 6 | Oregon State | Ralph Miller | Pacific-10 | Round of 64 | 11 Evansville | L 94–90 |
| West | 7 | UTEP | Don Haskins | Western Athletic | Round of 32 | 2 Indiana | L 92–69 |
| West | 8 | Saint Mary's | Lynn Nance | West Coast | Round of 64 | 9 Clemson | L 83–70 |
| West | 9 | Clemson | Cliff Ellis | Atlantic Coast | Round of 32 | 1 Arizona | L 94–68 |
| West | 10 | LSU | Dale Brown | Southeastern | Round of 64 | 7 UTEP | L 85–74 |
| West | 11 | Evansville | Jim Crews | Missouri Valley | Round of 32 | 3 Seton Hall | L 87–73 |
| West | 12 | DePaul | Joey Meyer | Independent | Round of 32 | 4 UNLV | L 85–70 |
| West | 13 | Idaho | Kermit Davis | Big Sky | Round of 64 | 4 UNLV | L 68–56 |
| West | 14 | Southwest Missouri State | Charlie Spoonhour | Mid-Continent | Round of 64 | 3 Seton Hall | L 60–51 |
| West | 15 | George Mason | Ernie Nestor | Colonial | Round of 64 | 2 Indiana | L 99–85 |
| West | 16 | Robert Morris | Jarrett Durham | Northeast | Round of 64 | 1 Arizona | L 94–60 |

== Bracket ==
* – Denotes overtime period

=== East Regional – East Rutherford, New Jersey ===
First round
1 | Georgetown | 50
16 | Princeton | 49
Providence
8 | Vanderbilt | 65
9 | Notre Dame | 81
5 | NC State | 81
12 | South Carolina | 66
Providence
4 | Iowa | 87
13 | Rutgers | 73
6 | Kansas State | 75
11 | Minnesota | 86
Greensboro
3 | Stanford | 78
14 | Siena | 80
7 | West Virginia | 84
10 | Tennessee | 68
Greensboro
2 | Duke | 90
15 | South Carolina State | 69

Quarter-finals
1 | Georgetown | 81
9 | Notre Dame | 74
5 | NC State | 102**
4 | Iowa | 96
11 | Minnesota | 80
14 | Siena | 67
7 | West Virginia | 63
2 | Duke | 70

Regional semifinals
1 | Georgetown | 69
5 | NC State | 61
11 | Minnesota | 70
2 | Duke | 87

Regional Finals
1 | Georgetown | 77
2 | Duke | 85

==== First round summary ====
NCAA Productions
ESPN

Thursday, March 16
approx. 9:37 PM EST

box score

#2 Duke Blue Devils 90, #15 South Carolina State Bulldogs 69
| Pts: P. Henderson – 22; Rebs: D. Ferry – 8 Asts: Q. Snyder – 8 | Pts: A. Caldwell – 20; Rebs: T. Williams – 8 Asts: A. Caldwell, D. Gilmore – 2 Halftime Score: Duke, 49–34 |

Greensboro Coliseum – Greensboro, North Carolina
Attendance: 14,574
Referees: Terry Stoudt, Mack Chauvin, Paul Sternberger

NCAA Productions
ESPN

Friday, March 17
12:07 PM EST

box score

#5 North Carolina State Wolfpack 81, #12 South Carolina Gamecocks 66

Providence Civic Center – Providence, Rhode Island
Attendance: 12,106
Referees: Gordon Birk, David Hall, Frank Bosone

NCAA Productions
ESPN

Friday, March 17
7:07 PM EST

box score

#1 Georgetown Hoyas 50, #16 Princeton Tigers 49
| Pts: A. Mourning – 21; Rebs: A. Mourning – 13 | Pts: R. Scrabis – 15; Rebs: G. Leftwich – 5 Asts: K. Mueller – 8 Halftime Score: Princeton, 29–21 |

Providence Civic Center – Providence, Rhode Island
Attendance: 12,106
Referees: Dick Paparo, Charles Range, J. Don Ferguson

==== Second round summary ====
CBS

Saturday, March 18
12:20 PM EST

box score

#2 Duke Blue Devils 70, #7 West Virginia Mountaineers 63
| Pts: D. Ferry – 20; Rebs: A. Abdelnaby, D. Ferry – 8 Asts: D. Ferry – 4 | Pts: H. Brooks – 13; Rebs: R. Foster – 10; Asts: S. Berger – 5 Halftime Score: Duke, 35–28 |

Greensboro Coliseum – Greensboro, North Carolina
Attendance: 14,920
Referees: Wally Tanner, Tom Rucker, Mack Chauvin

CBS

Sunday, March 19
12:20 PM EST

box score

#1 Georgetown Hoyas 81, #9 Notre Dame Fighting Irish 74
| Pts: C. Smith – 34; Rebs: J. Jackson – 7 Asts: C. Smith – 6 | Pts: L. Ellis – 24; Rebs: L. Ellis – 10; Asts: T. Singleton – 6 Halftime Score: Notre Dame, 36–32 |

Providence Civic Center – Providence, Rhode Island
Attendance: 12,106
Referees: Don Rutledge, Gordon Birk, Richie Ballesteros

CBS

Sunday, March 17
approx. 2:50 PM EST

box score

#5 North Carolina State Wolfpack 102, #4 Iowa Hawkeyes 96 (2OT)

Providence Civic Center – Providence, Rhode Island
Attendance: 12,106
Referees: Dick Paparo

==== Regional Semi-final summary ====
CBS

Friday, March 24
7:41 PM EST

box score

#2 Duke Blue Devils 87, #11 Minnesota Golden Gophers 70
| Pts: R. Brickey, P. Henderson – 21; Rebs: C. Laettner – 11; Asts: Q. Snyder – 8 | Pts: W. Burton – 26; Rebs: W. Bond – 6 Asts: M. Newbern – 7 Halftime Score: Duke, 45–30 |

Brendan Byrne Arena – East Rutherford, New Jersey
Attendance: 19,508
Referees: John Clougherty, Dan Chrisman, Tom O'Neill

CBS

Friday, March 24
approx. 10:11 PM EST

box score

#1 Georgetown Hoyas 69, #5 North Carolina State Wolfpack 61
| Pts: D. Bryant – 21; Rebs: A. Mourning – 12; Asts: C. Smith – 5 | Pts: R. Monroe – 26; Rebs: C. Brown – 12; Asts: C. Corchiani – 4 Halftime Score: Georgetown, 42–28 |

Brendan Byrne Arena – East Rutherford, New Jersey
Attendance: 19,508
Referees: Tom Lopes, Jim Bain, Rick Hartzell

==== Regional Final summary ====
CBS

Sunday, March 26
4:05 PM EST

box score

#2 Duke Blue Devils 85, #1 Georgetown Hoyas 77
| Pts: C. Laettner – 24; Rebs: C. Laettner – 9 Asts: Q. Snyder – 7 | Pts: C. Smith – 21; Rebs: S. Jefferson – 7 Asts: D. Bryant – 3 Halftime Score: Georgetown, 40–38 |

Brendan Byrne Arena – East Rutherford, New Jersey
Attendance: 19,514
Referees: Ted Hillary, David Jones, Tom Harrington

=== West Regional – Denver, Colorado ===
First round
1 | Arizona | 94
16 | Robert Morris | 60
Boise
8 | Saint Mary's | 70
9 | Clemson | 83
5 | Memphis State | 63
12 | DePaul | 66
Boise
4 | UNLV | 68
13 | Idaho | 56
6 | Oregon State | 90
11 | Evansville | 94*
Tucson
3 | Seton Hall | 60
14 | Southwest Missouri State | 51
7 | UTEP | 85
10 | LSU | 74
Tucson
2 | Indiana | 99
15 | George Mason | 85

Quarter-finals
1 | Arizona | 94
9 | Clemson | 68
12 | DePaul | 70
4 | UNLV | 85
11 | Evansville | 73
3 | Seton Hall | 87
7 | UTEP | 69
2 | Indiana | 92

Regional semifinals
1 | Arizona | 67
4 | UNLV | 68
3 | Seton Hall | 78
2 | Indiana | 65

Regional Finals
4 | UNLV | 61
3 | Seton Hall | 84

==== First round summary ====
NCAA Productions
ESPN

Thursday, March 16
6:07 PM PST/9:07 PM EST

box score

#4 UNLV Runnin' Rebels 68, #13 Idaho Vandals 56
| Pts: S. Augmon – 17; Rebs: M. Scurry – 14; Asts: A. Hunt – 4 | Pts: R. Smith – 20; Rebs: R. Brown, J. Fitch – 9 Asts: L. Nash – 3 Halftime Score: UNLV, 27–22 |

BSU Pavilion – Boise, Idaho
Attendance: 12,241

NCAA Productions
ESPN

Friday, March 17
approx. 2:37 PM MST/4:37 PM EST

box score

#3 Seton Hall Pirates 60, #14 Southwest Missouri State Bears 51
| Pts: J. Morton – 26; Rebs: D. Walker – 6 Asts: A. Gaze – 4 | Pts: H. Henderson – 18; Rebs: H. Henderson – 6 Asts: D. Lewis – 6 Halftime Score: Seton Hall, 30–23 |

McKale Center – Tucson, Arizona
Attendance: 12,787
Referees: Don Shea, Allie Prescott, Jim Loustaldt

==== Second round summary ====
CBS

Saturday, March 18
2:00 PM PST/5:00 PM EST

box score

#4 UNLV Runnin' Rebels 85, #12 DePaul Blue Demons 70
| Pts: D. Butler – 23; Rebs: S. Augmon – 6 Asts: A. Hunt – 7 | Pts: T. Greene – 29; Rebs: S. Brundy – 15; Asts: T. Greene – 6 Halftime Score: 40–40 |

BSU Pavilion – Boise, Idaho
Attendance: 12,428

CBS

Sunday, March 19
12:25 PM MST/2:25 PM EST

box score

#3 Seton Hall Pirates 87, #11 Evansville Aces 73
| Pts: J. Morton – 17; Rebs: R. Ramos, D. Walker – 10; Asts: G. Greene, P. Wigington – 5 | Pts: S. Haffner – 20; Rebs: D. Godfread – 6 Asts: R. Crafton – 7 Halftime Score: Seton Hall, 49–41 |

McKale Center – Tucson, Arizona
Attendance: 13,391
Referees: John Moreau, Sid Rodeheffer, Mark DiStaolo

==== Regional Semi-final summary ====
CBS

Thursday, March 23
6:09 PM MST/8:09 PM EST

box score

#3 Seton Hall Pirates 78, #2 Indiana Hoosiers 65
| Pts: J. Morton – 17; Rebs: D. Walker – 10; Asts: G. Greene – 5 | Pts: J. Edwards – 18; Rebs: E. Anderson – 6 Asts: J. Hillman, L. Jones – 3 Halftime Score: Seton Hall, 42–33 |

McNichols Sports Arena – Denver, Colorado
Attendance: 16,813
Referees: Jody Sylvester, Dave Libbey, David Bair

CBS

Thursday, March 23
approx. 8:39 PM MST/10:39 PM EST

box score

#4 UNLV Runnin' Rebels 68, #1 Arizona Wildcats 67
| Pts: A. Hunt – 21; Rebs: G. Ackles, S. Augmon – 6 Asts: G. Anthony – 11 | Pts: S. Elliott – 22; Rebs: S. Elliott – 14; Asts: K. Lofton – 6 Halftime Score: UNLV, 37–36 |

McNichols Sports Arena – Denver, Colorado
Attendance: 16,813
Referees: Ed Hightower, Tom Rucker, Frank Scagliota

==== Regional Final summary ====
CBS

Saturday, March 25
2:05 PM MST/4:05 PM EST

box score

#3 Seton Hall Pirates 84, #4 UNLV Runnin' Rebels 61
| Pts: A. Gaze – 19; Rebs: D. Walker – 15; Asts: G. Greene – 3 | Pts: G. Anthony – 16; Rebs: M. Scurry – 14; Asts: G. Anthony – 4 Halftime Score: Seton Hall, 34–30 |

McNichols Sports Arena – Denver, Colorado
Attendance: 16,813
Referees: Lenny Wirtz, David Dodge, Larry Rose

=== Southeast Regional – Lexington, Kentucky ===
First round
1 | Oklahoma | 72
16 | East Tennessee State | 71
Nashville
8 | La Salle | 74
9 | Louisiana Tech | 83
5 | Virginia | 100
12 | Providence | 97
Nashville
4 | Florida State | 83
13 | Middle Tennessee State | 97
6 | Alabama | 84
11 | South Alabama | 86
Atlanta
3 | Michigan | 92
14 | Xavier | 87
7 | UCLA | 84
10 | Iowa State | 74
Atlanta
2 | North Carolina | 93
15 | Southern | 79

Quarter-finals
1 | Oklahoma | 124
9 | Louisiana Tech | 81
5 | Virginia | 104
13 | Middle Tennessee State | 88
11 | South Alabama | 82
3 | Michigan | 91
7 | UCLA | 81
2 | North Carolina | 88

Regional semifinals
1 | Oklahoma | 80
5 | Virginia | 86
3 | Michigan | 92
2 | North Carolina | 87

Regional Finals
5 | Virginia | 65
3 | Michigan | 102

==== First round summary ====
NCAA Productions
ESPN

Thursday, March 16
7:07 PM CST/8:07 EST

box score

#5 Virginia Cavaliers 100, #12 Providence Friars 97
| Pts: R. Morgan – 33; Rebs: M. Blundin, B. Stith – 7 Asts: J. Crotty – 10 | Pts: M. Conlon – 23; Rebs: A. Shamsid-Deen – 8 Asts: E. Murdick, C. Screen – 6 Halftime Score: Virginia, 50–49 |

Memorial Gymnasium – Nashville, Tennessee
Attendance: 12,541
Referees: Tom Harrington, Willis McJunkin, Tom Clark

NCAA Productions
ESPN

Friday, March 17
12:07 PM EST

box score

#3 Michigan Wolverines 92, #14 Xavier Musketeers 87
| Pts: G. Rice, R. Robinson – 23; Rebs: M. Hughes – 10; Asts: R. Robinson – 8 | Pts: T. Hill – 21; Rebs: D. Strong – 10; Asts: J. Walker – 9 Halftime Score: Xavier, 45–42 |

Omni Coliseum – Atlanta, Georgia
Attendance: 12,349
Referees: Nick Borucki, Dave Libbey, Bob Barnett

==== Second round summary ====
CBS

Saturday, March 18
approx. 3:55 PM CST/4:55 EST

box score

#5 Virginia Cavaliers 104, #13 Middle Tennessee State Blue Raiders 88
| Pts: R. Morgan– 33; Rebs: M. Blundin – 8 Asts: J. Crotty – 14 | Pts: R. Henry, C. Rainey – 23; Rebs: K. Hammonds – 15; Asts: K. Hammonds, C. Rainey – 5 Halftime Score: Virginia, 49–39 |

Memorial Gymnasium – Nashville, Tennessee
Attendance: 13,453
Referees: Tom Harrington, Jody Sylvester, Tom Clark

CBS

Sunday, March 19
2:20 PM EST

box score

#3 Michigan Wolverines 91, #11 South Alabama Jaguars 82
| Pts: G. Rice – 36; Rebs: G. Rice – 8 Asts: D. Calip, T. Mills, G. Rice, R. Robinson – 5 | Pts: J. Lewis – 25; Rebs: G. Estaba, J. Lewis – 9 Asts: T. Brodnick – 6 Halftime Score: South Alabama, 47–44 |

Omni Coliseum – Atlanta, Georgia
Attendance: 12,821
Referees: Dave Libbey, Gene Monje, Bob Barnett

==== Regional Semi-final summary ====
CBS

Thursday, March 23
7:41 PM EST

box score

#5 Virginia Cavaliers 86, #1 Oklahoma Sooners 80
| Pts: B. Stith – 28; Rebs: B. Dabbs – 14; Asts: J. Crotty – 8 | Pts: S. King – 22; Rebs: S. King – 6 Asts: M. Blaylock – 5 Halftime Score: Virginia, 42–37 |

Rupp Arena – Lexington, Kentucky
Attendance: 22,314
Referees: Gene Monje, Bob Dibler, Herman Ramsey

CBS

Thursday, March 23
approx. 10:11 PM EST

box score

#3 Michigan Wolverines 92, #2 North Carolina Tar Heels 87
| Pts: G. Rice – 34; Rebs: M. Hughes, T. Mills, G. Rice, L. Vaught – 6 Asts: R. Robinson – 13 | Pts: J.R. Reid – 26; Rebs: S. Bucknall – 7 Asts: S. Bucknall – 10; Halftime Score: Michigan, 50–47 |

Rupp Arena – Lexington, Kentucky
Attendance: 22,314
Referees: Don Rutledge, Tom Scott, Wally Tanner

==== Regional Final summary ====
CBS

Saturday, March 25
1:58 PM EST

box score

#3 Michigan Wolverines 102, #5 Virginia Cavaliers 65
| Pts: G. Rice – 32; Rebs: L. Vaught – 9 Asts: R. Robinson – 7 | Pts: R. Morgan – 15; Rebs: B. Dabbs – 12; Asts: J. Crotty – 7 Halftime Score: Michigan, 44–25 |

Rupp Arena – Lexington, Kentucky
Attendance: 22,755
Referees: Mickey Crowley, Jim Burr, Frank Bosone

=== Midwest Regional – Minneapolis ===
First round
1 | Illinois | 77
16 | McNeese State | 71
Indianapolis
8 | Pittsburgh | 64
9 | Ball State | 68
5 | Arkansas | 120
12 | Loyola Marymount | 101
Indianapolis
4 | Louisville | 76
13 | Arkansas–Little Rock | 71
6 | Georgia Tech | 70
11 | Texas | 76
Dallas
3 | Missouri | 85
14 | Creighton | 69
7 | Florida | 46
10 | Colorado State | 68
Dallas
2 | Syracuse | 104
15 | Bucknell | 81

Quarter-finals
1 | Illinois | 72
9 | Ball State | 60
5 | Arkansas | 84
4 | Louisville | 93
11 | Texas | 89
3 | Missouri | 108
10 | Colorado State | 50
2 | Syracuse | 65

Regional semifinals
1 | Illinois | 83
4 | Louisville | 69
3 | Missouri | 80
2 | Syracuse | 83

Regional Finals
1 | Illinois | 89
2 | Syracuse | 86

==== First round summary ====
NCAA Productions
ESPN

Thursday, March 16
12:07 PM EST

box score

#4 Louisville Cardinals 76, #13 Arkansas-Little Rock Trojans 71

Hoosier Dome – Indianapolis
Attendance: 37,232
Referees: Tom Lopes, Bruce Shapiro, Jerry Stone

NCAA Productions
ESPN

Thursday, March 16
7:07 PM EST

box score

#1 Illinois Fighting Illini 77, #16 McNeese State Cowboys 71
| Pts: K. Battle – 18; Rebs: N. Anderson – 12; Asts: L. Smith – 4 | Pts: M. Cutright – 5 Rebs: A. Pullard – 8 Asts: D. Davis – 5 Halftime Score: Illinois, 26–21 |

Hoosier Dome – Indianapolis
Attendance: 37,242
Referees: Bobby Dibler, John Hannon, David Dodge

NCAA Productions
ESPN

Friday, March 17
12:07 PM CST/1:07 PM EST

box score

#2 Syracuse Orangemen 104, #15 Bucknell Bison 81
| Pts: B. Owens – 27; Rebs: B. Owens – 13; Asts: S. Douglas – 9 | Pts: M. Butts – 22; Rebs: B. Heiden – 8 Asts: M. Joseph – 9 Halftime Score: Syracuse, 52–36 |

Reunion Arena – Dallas, Texas
Attendance: 8,711
Referees: George Evans, David Jones, Phil Bova

NCAA Productions
ESPN

Friday, March 17
7:07 PM CST/8:07 PM EST

box score

#3 Missouri Tigers 85, #14 Creighton Blue Jays 69

Reunion Arena – Dallas, Texas
Attendance: 9,484
Referees: John Clogherty, Samford, Jim Stupin

==== Second round summary ====
CBS

Saturday, March 18
2:20 PM EST

box score

#1 Illinois Fighting Illini 72, #9 Ball State Cardinals 60
| Pts: N. Anderson – 24; Rebs: K. Battle – 8 Asts: K. Gill – 7 | Pts: C. Kidd – 16; Rebs: P. McCurdy – 12; Asts: S. Nichols – 6 Halftime Score: Illinois, 34–23 |

Hoosier Dome – Indianapolis
Attendance: 37,444
Referees: Bobby Dibler, David Dodge, Herman Ramsey

CBS

Saturday, March 18
approx. 4:50 PM EST

box score

#4 Louisville Cardinals 93, #5 Arkansas Razorbacks 84

Hoosier Dome – Indianapolis
Attendance: 37,444
Referees: Larry Lembo, Tom Lopes, Larry Rose

CBS

Sunday, March 19
1:35 CST/2:35 PM EST

box score

#3 Missouri Tigers 108, #11 Texas Longhorns 89

Reunion Arena – Dallas, Texas
Attendance: 10,683
Referees: John Clougherty, David Jones, Odgen

CBS

Sunday, March 19
approx. 4:05 PM CST/5:05 PM EST

box score

#2 Syracuse Orangemen 65, #10 Colorado State Rams 50
| Pts: S. Thompson – 21; Rebs: D. Coleman – 7 Asts: S. Douglas – 8 | Pts: A. Anderson – 15; Rebs: P. Durham – 6 Asts: P. Durham – 4 Halftime Score: Syracuse, 38–28 |

Reunion Arena – Dallas, Texas
Attendance: 10,683
Referees: Jim Bain, Jerry Petro, Donnee Gray

==== Regional Semi-final summary ====
CBS

Friday, March 24
7:09 PM CST/8:09 PM EST

box score

#1 Illinois Fighting Illini 83, #4 Louisville Cardinals 69
| Pts: N. Anderson – 24; Rebs: S. Bardo, M. Liberty – 8 Asts: S. Bardo – 6 | Pts: K. Payne – 19; Rebs: P. Ellison – 9 Asts: P. Ellison, L. Smith – 4 Halftime Score: Illinois, 40–37 |

Hubert H. Humphrey Metrodome – Minneapolis, Minnesota
Attendance: 33,560
Referees: Dick Paparo, Tim Higgins, Donnee Gray

CBS

Friday, March 24
approx. 9:39 PM CST/10:39 PM EST

box score

#2 Syracuse Orangemen 83, #3 Missouri Tigers 80
| Pts: S. Douglas – 27; Rebs: D. Coleman – 12; Asts: S. Douglas – 7 | Pts: B. Irvin – 21; Rebs: D. Smith – 13; Asts: L. Coward – 6 Halftime Score: Missouri, 42–40 |

Hubert H. Humphrey Metrodome – Minneapolis, Minnesota
Attendance: 33,560
Referees: Richie Ballesteros, Sam Lickliter, Paul Housman

==== Regional Final summary ====
CBS

Sunday, March 26
12:58 PM CST/1:58 PM EST

box score

#1 Illinois Fighting Illini 89, #2 Syracuse Orangemen 86
| Pts: K. Battle – 28; Rebs: N. Anderson – 16; Asts: L. Smith, K. Gill – 5 | Pts: B. Owens – 22; Rebs: D. Coleman – 10; Asts: S. Douglas – 8 Halftime Score: Syracuse, 46–39 |

Hubert H. Humphrey Metrodome – Minneapolis, Minnesota
Attendance: 33,496
Referees: Larry Lembo, Jim Rife, John Moreau

=== Final Four – Seattle ===
National semifinals
E2 | Duke | 78
W3 | Seton Hall | 95
SE3 | Michigan | 83
MW1 | Illinois | 81

National Championship Game
W3 | Seton Hall | 79
SE3 | Michigan | 80^{OT}

==== Game summaries ====
CBS

Saturday, April 1
2:42 PM PST/5:42 PM EST

box score

#W3 Seton Hall Pirates 95, #E2 Duke Blue Devils 78
| Pts: A. Gaze – 20; Rebs: R. Ramos – 12; Asts: G. Greene – 8 | Pts: D. Ferry – 34; Rebs: D. Ferry – 10; Asts: P. Henderson – 5 Halftime Score: Duke, 38–33 |

Kingdome – Seattle, WA
Attendance: 39,187
Referees: Larry Lembo, Don Rutledge, Ed Hightower

CBS

Saturday, April 1
approx. 5:12 PM PST/8:12 PM EST

box score

#SE3 Michigan Wolverines 83, #MW1 Illinois Fighting Illini 81
| Pts: G. Rice – 28; Rebs: L. Vaught – 16; Asts: R. Robinson – 12 | Pts: K. Battle – 29; Rebs: L. Hamilton – 9 Asts: S. Bardo – 8 Halftime Score: Michigan, 39–38 |

Kingdome – Seattle, WA
Attendance: 39,187
Referees: Ted Hillary, David Jones, Tom Harrington

=== National Championship ===
CBS

Monday, April 3
6:12 PM PDT/9:12 PM EDT

box score

#SE3 Michigan Wolverines 80, #W3 Seton Hall Pirates 79 (OT)
| Pts: G. Rice – 31; Rebs: G. Rice – 11; Asts: R. Robinson – 11 | Pts: J. Morton – 35; Rebs: D. Walker – 11; Asts: G. Greene – 5 Halftime Score: Michigan, 37–32; End of Regulation: 71–71 |

Kingdome – Seattle, WA
Attendance: 39,187
Referees: Mickey Crowley, Tom Rucker, John Clougherty

== Announcers ==
=== Television ===
CBS Sports

- Jim Nantz & James Brown served as studio hosts.
- Brent Musburger and Billy Packer – first round (DePaul–Memphis State) at Boise, Idaho; second round at Indianapolis, Indiana and Atlanta, Georgia; East Regionals at East Rutherford, New Jersey; Final Four at Seattle, Washington
- Dick Stockton and Bill Raftery – second round at Greensboro, North Carolina and Dallas, Texas; West Regionals at Denver, Colorado
- Tim Brant and Len Elmore – second round at Boise, Idaho; Southeast Regionals at Lexington, Kentucky
- Verne Lundquist and Tom Heinsohn – first round (Louisiana State–UTEP) and Second Round at Tucson, Arizona; Midwest Regionals at Minneapolis, Minnesota
- Steve Zabriskie and Curry Kirkpatrick – second round at Nashville, Tennessee
- Greg Gumbel and Quinn Buckner – second round at Providence, Rhode Island

ESPN and NCAA Productions

- Tim Brando (NCAA Tournament Today) and John Saunders (NCAA Tournament Tonight) served as studio hosts and Dick Vitale served as studio analyst.
- Bob Carpenter and Quinn Buckner – first round (South Carolina–North Carolina State) & (Notre Dame–Vanderbilt) at Providence, Rhode Island
- Mike Gorman and Ron Perry – first round (Rutgers–Iowa) & (Princeton–Georgetown) at Providence, Rhode Island
- Mike Patrick and Dan Bonner – first round (Minnesota–Kansas State) & (South Carolina State–Duke) at Greensboro, North Carolina
- Bob Rathbun and Bucky Waters – first round (Siena–Stanford) & (Tennessee–West Virginia) at Greensboro, North Carolina
- Tom Hammond and Clark Kellogg – first round (UALR–Louisville) & (Ball State–Pittsburgh) at Indianapolis, Indiana
- Mick Hubert and Jim Gibbons – first round (Loyola Marymount–Arkansas) & (McNeese State–Illinois) at Indianapolis, Indiana
- Ron Franklin and Billy King – first round (Texas–Georgia Tech) at Dallas, Texas
- Frank Fallon and Bob Ortegel – first round (Colorado State–Florida), (Creighton–Missouri), & (Syracuse–Bucknell) at Dallas, Texas
- Wayne Larrivee and Jack Givens – first round (Louisiana Tech–LaSalle) & (Middle Tennessee State–Florida State) at Nashville, Tennessee
- John Sanders and Gary Thompson – first round (East Tennessee State–Oklahoma) & (Providence–Virginia) at Nashville, Tennessee
- Ralph Hacker and Dan Belluomini – first round (Xavier–Michigan) & (Iowa State–UCLA) at Atlanta, Georgia
- Fred White and Larry Conley – first round (South Alabama–Alabama) & (Southern–North Carolina) at Atlanta, Georgia
- Brad Nessler and Irv Brown – first round (Robert Morris–Arizona) & (Idaho–UNLV) at Boise, Idaho
- Ted Robinson and Mike Pratt– first round (Clemson–Saint Mary's) at Boise, Idaho
- Pete Solomon and Bob Elliott – first round (Evansville–Oregon State) at Tucson, Arizona
- Barry Tompkins and Bruce Larson – first round (SW Missouri State–Seton Hall) & (George Mason–Indiana) at Tucson, Arizona

=== Radio ===
==== First and second rounds ====
CBS Radio

==== Regionals ====
- – East Regionals at East Rutherford, New Jersey
- – Midwest Regionals at Minneapolis, Minnesota
- – Southeast Regionals at Lexington, Kentucky
- Ted Robinson and – West Regionals at Denver, Colorado

==== Final Four ====
- – at Seattle, Washington

| Region | Seed | Teams | Flagship station | Play-by-play announcer | Color analyst(s) |
|---|---|---|---|---|---|
| West | 3 | Seton Hall | WPAT–AM 930 | | |

== Legacy ==
The story of the Wolverines' success was cited as inspiration in another sport. When the Spain national football team manager Julen Lopetegui was sacked days before the 2018 FIFA World Cup started after agreeing to join Real Madrid after the tournament, Spanish defender Gerard Piqué drew parallels with Michigan's NCAA win amid similar circumstances. Unfortunately, Spain failed to advance beyond the round of 16 while France won the tournament.

== See also ==
- 1989 NCAA Division II men's basketball tournament
- 1989 NCAA Division III men's basketball tournament
- 1989 NCAA Division I women's basketball tournament
- 1989 NCAA Division II women's basketball tournament
- 1989 NCAA Division III women's basketball tournament
- 1989 National Invitation Tournament
- 1989 National Women's Invitation Tournament
- 1989 NAIA Division I men's basketball tournament
- 1989 NAIA Division I women's basketball tournament
