= Stephen Bardo =

American basketball player (born 1968)

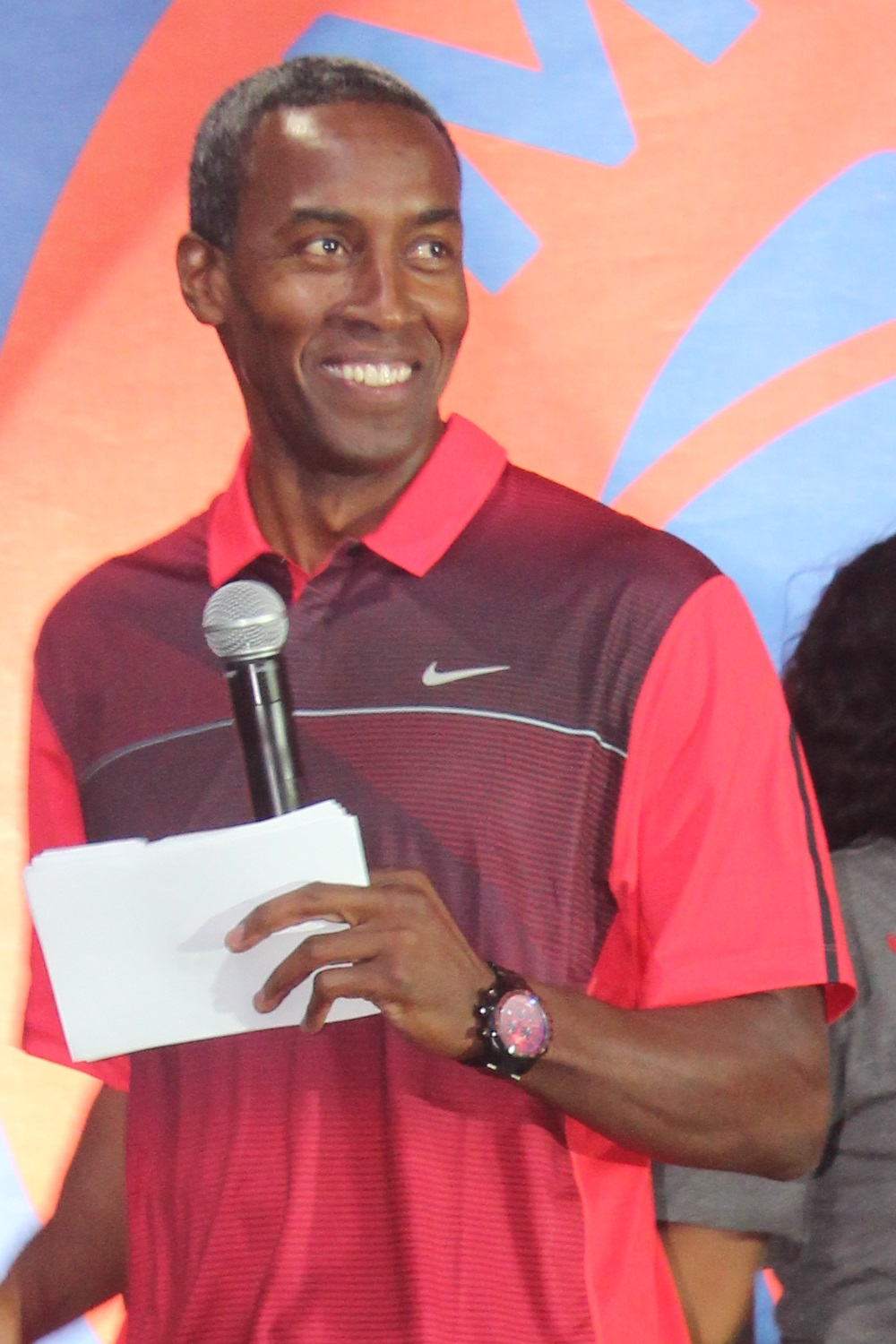
- Bardo at the 2014 World Basketball Festival

Personal information
- Born: April 5, 1968 (age 58) Henderson, Kentucky, U.S.
- Listed height: 6 ft 5 in (1.96 m)
- Listed weight: 190 lb (86 kg)

Career information
- High school: Carbondale (Carbondale, Illinois)
- College: Illinois (1986–1990)
- NBA draft: 1990: 2nd round, 41st overall pick
- Drafted by: Atlanta Hawks
- Playing career: 1990–2000
- Position: Shooting guard
- Number: 42, 23, 25

Career history
- 1990–1991: Quad City Thunder
- 1991: Atlanta Eagles
- 1991–1992: Quad City Thunder
- 1992: San Antonio Spurs
- 1992–1993: Dallas Mavericks
- 1993: Wichita Falls Texans
- 1993: Levallois
- 1993–1994: Teamsystem Fabriano
- 1994: Wichita Falls Texans
- 1994–1995: Chicago Rockers
- 1995: Joventut Badalona
- 1995–1996: Detroit Pistons
- 1996: Chicago Rockers
- 1996–2000: Toshiba Brave Thunders Kanagawa

Career highlights
- All-CBA First Team (1993); 2× All-CBA Second Team (1992, 1994); 2× CBA Defensive Player of the Year (1993, 1994); 3× CBA All-Defensive Team (1992–1994)
- Stats at NBA.com
- Stats at Basketball Reference

Stephen Dean Bardo (born April 5, 1968) is an American former professional basketball player who played three seasons in the National Basketball Association (NBA). He is currently a college basketball analyst.

== Basketball career ==
During his standout career at the University of Illinois, 6'5" Bardo scored 909 points and compiled 495 assists. He was part of the Flyin' Illini team that qualified for the 1989 NCAA men's basketball tournament Final Four. That Fighting Illini team gained the moniker "Flyin' Illini" by Dick Vitale while broadcasting a game during the 1988–89 season. Bardo was named Big Ten defensive player of the year in 1989. Along with Bardo, the other starting members of that team included Nick Anderson, Kendall Gill, Lowell Hamilton, Kenny Battle, and key reserve Marcus Liberty.

Bardo was selected in the 1990 NBA draft by the Atlanta Hawks, but never played for the team, playing one game (one minute) with the San Antonio Spurs during the 1991–92 NBA season. He also appeared for the Dallas Mavericks and Detroit Pistons, amassing 32 more regular season games, and leaving the National Basketball Association with per-game averages of 2 points, 2 rebounds and one assist.

Bardo also played in France, Italy, Japan, Spain, Venezuela overseas as well as the Continental Basketball Association (CBA). He was selected as CBA Defensive Player in 1993 and 1994. Bardo was named to the All-CBA First Team in 1993, All-CBA Second Team in 1992 and 1994, and All-Defensive Team in 1992, 1993 and 1994. He enjoyed a 10-year professional playing career.

== College stats ==
Season	Games	Points	PPG	Assists	APG	Steals	Big Ten Record	Overall Record	Postseason
1986–87	31	119	3.7	85	2.7	23	13–2	23–8	NCAA First Round
1987–88	33	216	6.5	125	3.8	41	11–7	21–10	NCAA Second Round
1988–89	36	293	8.1	148	4.4	34	14–4	31–5	NCAA Final Four
1989–90	29	281	9.7	137	4.7	37	11–7	21–8	NCAA First Round
Totals	129	909	7.0	353	3.0	203	49–20	96–31	4 appearances

== Post-retirement ==
Since retiring in 2000, Bardo has worked in broadcasting. He has served as a color analyst for the Illini Sports Network, a sports reporter for WBBM-TV in Chicago, an analyst and reporter for CBS Sports, and a color analyst for college basketball on ESPN and Big Ten Network. He has also participated on ESPN First Take. Additionally, he works as a motivational speaker, and authored the book How To Make The League Without Picking Up The Rock. In 2021, Bardo began filling in as an analyst on Bally Sports Wisconsin's Milwaukee Bucks broadcasts for regular color commentator Marques Johnson.

In May 2015, Bardo, who is African-American, publicly criticized the University of Illinois's athletic department over the lack of diversity among prominent head coaches at the university.
