= Joe Hillman =

American basketball and baseball player

Personal information
- Born: August 12, 1966 (age 60)
- Listed height: 6 ft 3 in (1.91 m)
- Listed weight: 195 lb (88 kg)

Career information
- High school: Hoover (Glendale, California)
- College: Indiana (1984–1989)
- NBA draft: 1989: undrafted
- Position: Point guard

Career history
- 1990–1991: North Melbourne Giants
- 1993: Manchester Giants

Career highlights
- All-NBL Second Team (1990); NCAA champion (1987); AP Honorable mention All-American (1989); First-team Academic All-American (1989); Second-team All-Big Ten (1989)

Joseph Thomas Hillman (born August 12, 1966) is an American former basketball and baseball player. He was an All-Big Ten Conference player at Indiana University (IU) and was a member of their 1987 NCAA championship team.

Hillman starred at Hoover High School in Glendale, California where as a senior he averaged 41.4 points per game and 26.6 points per game for his three-year high school career. He came to Indiana in 1984 as the first player from West of the Mississippi River to be recruited by Hall of Fame coach Bob Knight. Hillman played sparingly as a freshman, averaging 7 minutes and 1.5 points per game, and Knight chose to redshirt him for the 1985–86 season. Hillman returned for the 1986–87 season and was able to earn 13 minutes per game backing up starters Steve Alford and Keith Smart as the team's third guard. The Hoosiers won the NCAA title that year, defeating Syracuse in the championship game with Hillman collecting 6 assists, tied for team high.

In addition to his play on the hardcourt, Hillman also played baseball for the Hoosiers. He was selected by the Oakland A's in the 25th round of the 1988 Major League Baseball draft and signed with the A's, reporting to their A affiliate, the Southern Oregon A's for the 1988 season. As a first baseman for Southern Oregon, he hit .310 in his first professional season. He decided to return to Indiana for the 1988–89 season for his final remaining season of basketball eligibility, working with Coach Knight to allow him to finish his baseball season before returning to IU. In that redshirt senior season, Hillman became a key player for the Hoosiers, averaging 12.6 points per game and serving as captain of the eventual Big Ten champions. Despite his somewhat modest statistics, Hillman's importance to the team was recognized by opposing coaches, some of whom championed his candidacy for Big Ten Player of the Year (eventually shared by teammate Jay Edwards and Glen Rice of Michigan). He was named second-team all-conference and an honorable mention All-American by the Associated Press.

Following the close of his college basketball career, Hillman was not drafted in the 1989 NBA draft. He paused his minor league baseball career to try out for the National Basketball Association's Utah Jazz. He played for the Jazz in summer league and earned an invitation to Jazz training camp, but ultimately did not make the team. He finished out the baseball season with the Modesto A's, but it would prove to be his last. He played basketball professionally in Australia (for the North Melbourne Giants) and England.
