= 1988–89 Iowa Hawkeyes men's basketball team =

American college basketball season

1988–89 Iowa Hawkeyes men's basketball

Amana-Hawkeye Classic Champions

NCAA men's Division I tournament, Round of 32
- Conference: Big Ten Conference

Ranking
- Coaches: No. 15
- AP: No. 14
- Record: 23–10 (10–8 Big Ten)
- Head coach: Tom Davis (3rd season)
- Assistant coaches: Bruce Pearl (3rd season); Gary Close (3rd season); Rudy Washington
- MVPs: B. J. Armstrong; Ed Horton; Roy Marble
- Home arena: Carver-Hawkeye Arena

1988–89 Big Ten Conference men's basketball standings
	Conf.				Overall
Team	W		L	PCT	W		L	PCT
No. 8 Indiana	15	–	3	.833	27	–	8	.771
No. 3 Illinois	14	–	4	.778	31	–	5	.861
No. 10 Michigan	12	–	6	.667	30	–	7	.811
No. 14 Iowa	10	–	8	.556	23	–	10	.697
Minnesota	9	–	9	.500	19	–	12	.613
Wisconsin	8	–	10	.444	18	–	12	.600
Purdue	8	–	10	.444	15	–	16	.484
Ohio State	6	–	12	.333	19	–	15	.559
Michigan State	6	–	12	.333	18	–	15	.545
Northwestern	2	–	16	.111	9	–	19	.321
Rankings from AP Poll

The 1988–89 Iowa Hawkeyes men's basketball team represented the University of Iowa as members of the Big Ten Conference during the 1988–89 NCAA Division I men's basketball season. The team was led by third-year head coach Tom Davis and played their home games at Carver-Hawkeye Arena. They finished the season 23–10 overall and 10–8 in Big Ten play to finish in fourth place. The Hawkeyes received an at-large bid to the NCAA tournament as #4 seed in the East Region. After defeating Rutgers in the first round, they lost to #5 seed NC State in double overtime in the Round of 32.

== Roster ==
1988–89 Iowa Hawkeyes men's basketball team
Players
Coaches

Pos.	#	Name	Height	Weight	Year	Hometown
G	4	Brian Garner	6 ft 0 in (1.83 m)	—	Fr	Milwaukee, Wisconsin
G	10	B. J. Armstrong	6 ft 2 in (1.88 m)	—	Sr	Bloomfield Hills, Michigan
G	11	Troy Skinner	5 ft 11 in (1.8 m)	—	Fr	Palmer, Iowa
G/F	23	Roy Marble	6 ft 6 in (1.98 m)	—	Sr	Flint, Michigan
G/F	24	James Moses	6 ft 4 in (1.93 m)	—	Fr	Carson, California
F	25	Ed Horton	6 ft 8 in (2.03 m)	—	Sr	Springfield, Illinois
G	32	Ray Thompson	6 ft 5 in (1.96 m)	—	Fr	Summit, Illinois
F	34	Wade Lookingbill	6 ft 6 in (1.98 m)	—	Fr	Fort Dodge, Iowa
F	50	Matt Bullard	6 ft 10 in (2.08 m)	—	Jr	Des Moines, Iowa
C	51	Les Jepsen	7 ft 0 in (2.13 m)	—	Jr	Bowbells, North Dakota

Head coach

- Tom Davis (UW–Platteville)

Assistant coach(es)

- Bruce Pearl (Boston College)
- Gary Close (Arizona State)
- Rudy Washington (Redlands)

Legend

- (C) Team captain
- (S) Suspended
- (I) Ineligible
- (W) Walk-on
- Injured
- Current redshirt

== Schedule/results ==
Date time, TV	Rank^{#}	Opponent^{#}	Result	Record	Site city, state
Non-conference regular season
11/26/1988*	No. 7	McNeese State	W 77–56	1–0	Carver-Hawkeye Arena; Iowa City, IA
11/29/1988*	No. 6	at Drake; Iowa Big Four	W 96–72	2–0	Veterans Memorial Auditorium; Des Moines, IA
12/2/1988*	No. 6	Brown; Amana-Hawkeye Classic	W 109–61	3–0	Carver Hawkeye Arena; Iowa City, IA
12/3/1988*	No. 6	Georgia; Amana-Hawkeye Classic	W 102–76	4–0	Carver-Hawkeye Arena (15,500); Iowa City, IA
12/6/1988*; 7:00 pm	No. 5	Northern Iowa; Iowa Big Four	W 98–76	5–0	Carver-Hawkeye Arena (15,500); Iowa City, IA
12/10/1988*	No. 5	Iowa State; Rivalry	W 91–71	6–0	Carver-Hawkeye Arena (15,500); Iowa City, IA
12/12/1988*; 7:00 pm	No. 5	Jackson State	W 86–71	7–0	Carver-Hawkeye Arena (15,500); Iowa City, IA
12/14/1988*; 7:00 pm	No. 4	Central Florida	W 102–68	8–0	Carver-Hawkeye Arena (15,500); Iowa City, IA
12/23/1988*	No. 4	vs. Eastern Illinois; Chaminade Christmas Classic	W 89–71	9–0	Honolulu International Center; Honolulu, HI
12/24/1988*	No. 4	vs. Saint Louis; Chaminade Christmas Classic	W 83–80	10–0	Honolulu International Center; Honolulu, HI
12/25/1988*	No. 4	vs. UC Riverside; Chaminade Christmas Classic	L 92–110	10–1	Honolulu International Center; Honolulu, HI
12/30/1988*	No. 9	Texas State	W 96–77	11–1	Carver-Hawkeye Arena; Iowa City, IA
Big Ten Regular Season
1/5/1989	No. 9	at Michigan State	W 93–82	12–1 (1–0)	Jenison Fieldhouse; East Lansing, MI
1/7/1989	No. 9	at No. 6 North Carolina	W 98-97	13–1	Dean Smith Center; Chapel Hill, NC
1/14/1989	No. 5	at Minnesota	L 78–80	13–2 (1–1)	Williams Arena; Minnesota, MN
1/19/1989	No. 7	at No. 16 Ohio State	L 91–102	13–3 (1–2)	St. John Arena; Columbus, OH
1/21/1989	No. 7	at Purdue	W 67–66	14–3 (2–2)	Mackey Arena; West Lafayette, IN
1/26/1989	No. 12	Wisconsin	W 78–70	15–3 (3–2)	Carver-Hawkeye Arena; Iowa City, IA
1/30/1989	No. 12	at No. 16 Indiana	L 89–104	15–4 (3–3)	Assembly Hall; Bloomington, IN
2/2/1989	No. 9	Northwestern	W 102–84	16–4 (4–3)	Carver-Hawkeye Arena; Iowa City, IA
2/5/1989	No. 9	No. 2 Illinois	W 86–82	17–4 (5–3)	Carver-Hawkeye Arena (15,500); Iowa City, IA
2/9/1989	No. 8	No. 10 Michigan	L 107–108 ^{2 OT}	17–5 (5–4)	Carver-Hawkeye Arena (15,500); Iowa City, IA
2/11/1989	No. 8	at Wisconsin	L 54–65	17–6 (5–5)	Wisconsin Field House; Madison, WI
2/13/1989	No. 8	No. 16 Ohio State	W 83–75	18–6 (6–5)	Carver-Hawkeye Arena; Iowa City, IA
2/18/1989	No. 15	Minnesota	W 99–61	19–6 (7–5)	Carver-Hawkeye Arena; Iowa City, IA
2/22/1989	No. 14	at Northwestern	W 89–84	20–6 (8–5)	Welsh-Ryan Arena; Evanston, IL
2/26/1989	No. 14	Purdue	W 84–67	21–6 (9–5)	Carver-Hawkeye Arena; Iowa City, IA
3/2/1989	No. 11	Michigan State	L 81–83	21–7 (9–6)	Carver-Hawkeye Arena; Iowa City, IA
3/5/1989	No. 11	at No. 10 Michigan	L 96–119	21–8 (9–7)	Crisler Arena; Ann Arbor, MI
3/8/1989	No. 15	at No. 4 Illinois	L 94–118	21–9 (9–8)	Assembly Hall; Champaign, IL
3/11/1989	No. 15	No. 6 Indiana	W 87–70	22–9 (10–8)	Carver-Hawkeye Arena (15,500); Iowa City, IA
NCAA tournament
3/17/1989*	(4) No. 14	vs. (13) Rutgers; First Round	W 87–73	23–9	Providence Civic Center; Providence, RI
3/19/1989*; CBS	(4) No. 14	vs. (5) No. 19 NC State; Second Round	L 96–102 ^{2 OT}	23–10	Providence Civic Center; Providence, RI
*Non-conference game. ^{#}Rankings from AP Poll. (#) Tournament seedings in parentheses.

== Rankings ==
Ranking movements Legend: ██ Increase in ranking ██ Decrease in ranking т = Tied with team above or below
	Week																	
Poll	Pre	1	2	3	4	5	6	7	8	9	10	11	12	13	14	15	16	Final
AP	7	7	6	5	4	4	9	9	5	7	12	9	8	15	14	11	15	14
Coaches	9	9^	7	6	5	4	9	9	6	8 т	12	13	11	15	16	11	17	15

^Coaches did not release a Week 1 poll.

== Team players in the 1989 NBA draft ==
Round	Pick	Player	NBA club
1	18	B. J. Armstrong	Chicago Bulls
1	23	Roy Marble	Atlanta Hawks
2	39	Ed Horton	Washington Bullets
