= 1988–89 Michigan State Spartans men's basketball team =

American college basketball season

1988–89 Michigan State Spartans men's basketball

NIT, fourth place
- Conference: Big Ten Conference
- Record: 18–15 (6–12 Big Ten)
- Head coach: Jud Heathcote (13th season)
- Assistant coaches: Tom Izzo; Herb Williams; Jim Boylan
- Captains: Ken Redfield; Todd Wolfe
- Home arena: Jenison Fieldhouse

1988–89 Big Ten Conference men's basketball standings
	Conf.				Overall
Team	W		L	PCT	W		L	PCT
No. 8 Indiana	15	–	3	.833	27	–	8	.771
No. 3 Illinois	14	–	4	.778	31	–	5	.861
No. 10 Michigan	12	–	6	.667	30	–	7	.811
No. 14 Iowa	10	–	8	.556	23	–	10	.697
Minnesota	9	–	9	.500	19	–	12	.613
Wisconsin	8	–	10	.444	18	–	12	.600
Purdue	8	–	10	.444	15	–	16	.484
Ohio State	6	–	12	.333	19	–	15	.559
Michigan State	6	–	12	.333	18	–	15	.545
Northwestern	2	–	16	.111	9	–	19	.321
Rankings from AP Poll

The 1988–89 Michigan State Spartans men's basketball team represented Michigan State University in the 1988–89 NCAA Division I men's basketball season. The team played their home games at Jenison Field House in East Lansing, Michigan and were members of the Big Ten Conference. They were coached by Jud Heathcote in his 13th year at Michigan State. This season marked the Spartans' final season of basketball at Jenison Fieldhouse before moving to their current venue, the Breslin Center, the following season. The Spartans finished the season 18–15, 6–12 in Big Ten play to finish in eighth place. Michigan State received a bid to the National Invitation Tournament where they beat Kent State, Wichita State, and Villanova to reach the semifinals at Madison Square Garden. In the semifinals, they lost to Saint Louis. In the third place game, they lost to UAB in overtime.

== Previous season ==
The Spartans finished the 1987–88 season with an overall record of 10–18, 5–13 to finish in eighth place in Big Ten play.

== Roster and statistics ==
1988–89 Michigan State Spartans men's basketball team
No	Name	Pos	Year	Height	Pts	Reb	Ast
22	Jeff Casler	G	SO	6–0	0.8	0.6	0.7
23	Jesse Hall	G	SO	6–3	3.8	1.8	1.3
42	Parish Hickman	F	FR	6–7	5.1	3.2	0.4
10	Kirk Manns	G	JR	6–1	11.5	0.6	1.0
11	Mark Montgomery	G	FR	6–2	3.3	1.9	3.0
34	David Mueller	F	JR	6–9	0.3	0.6	0.0
20	Ken Redfield	F	JR	6–7	14.3	6.6	4.0
30	Jim Sarkine	F	SR	6–9	0.1	0.3	0.1
21	Steve Smith	G	SO	6–6	17.9	7.2	3.3
35	Matt Steigenga	F	FR	6–7	9.0	4.6	1.4
44	Scott Sekal	F	SR	6–8	2.1	0.9	0.0
24	Todd Wolfe	G/F	SR	6–5	8.1	3.0	1.1
25	Jon Zulauf	F	FR	6–7	0.0	3.0	0.0

== Schedule and results ==
Date time, TV	Rank^{#}	Opponent^{#}	Result	Record	Site city, state
Non-conference regular season
Nov 28, 1988*		Furman	W 98–68	1–0	Jenison Field House; East Lansing, MI
Nov 30, 1988*		at Nebraska	W 77–75	2–0	Bob Devaney Sports Center; Lincoln, NE
Dec 10, 1988*		Bowling Green State	W 89–72	3–0	Jenison Field House; East Lansing, MI
Dec 13, 1988*		UIC	W 96–74	4–0	Jenison Field House; East Lansing, MI
Dec 15, 1988*		at Detroit Mercy	W 96–74	5–0	Calihan Hall; Detroit, MI
Dec 16, 1988*		Bowling Green State	W 89–72	6–0	Jenison Field House; East Lansing, MI
Dec 17, 1988*		Austin Peay	W 70–60	7–0	Jenison Field House; East Lansing, MI
Dec 22, 1988*		Eastern Michigan	W 91–76	8–0	Jenison Field House; East Lansing, MI
Dec 27, 1988*		vs. Colorado; Far West Classic quarterfinals	W 60–57	9–0	Memorial Coliseum; Portland, OR
Dec 28, 1988*		vs. Oregon State; Far West Classic semifinals	L 58–63	9–1	Memorial Coliseum; Portland, OR
Dec 29, 1988*		vs. Oregon; Far West Classic third place game	W 76–61	10–1	Memorial Coliseum; Portland, OR
Big Ten regular season
Jan 5, 1989		No. 9 Iowa	L 82–93	10–2 (0–1)	Jenison Field House; East Lansing, MI
Jan 7, 1989		at No. 3 Illinois	L 54–71	10–3 (0–2)	Assembly Hall; Champaign, IL
Jan 11, 1989		at Northwestern	W 64–62	11–3 (1–2)	Welsh-Ryan Arena; Evanston, IL
Jan 14, 1989		No. 18 Ohio State	L 81–83	11–4 (1–3)	Jenison Field House; East Lansing, MI
Jan 21, 1989		at No. 19 Indiana	L 60–75	11–5 (1–4)	Assembly Hall; Bloomington, IN
Jan 25, 1989		Purdue	W 106–83	12–5 (2–4)	Jenison Field House; East Lansing, MI
Jan 28, 1989		Minnesota	W 73–64	13–5 (3–4)	Jenison Field House; East Lansing, MI
Feb 2, 1989		at Wisconsin	L 64–69	13–6 (3–5)	Wisconsin Field House; Madison, WI
Feb 4, 1989		at No. 11 Michigan; Rivalry	L 66–82	13–7 (3–6)	Crisler Arena; Ann Arbor, MI
Feb 11, 1989		at No. 16 Ohio State	L 75–81	13–8 (3–7)	St. John Arena; Columbus, OH
Feb 16, 1989		No. 5 Illinois	L 56–75	13–9 (3–8)	Jenison Field House; East Lansing, MI
Feb 18, 1989		at Purdue	L 65–76	13–10 (3–9)	Mackey Arena; West Lafayette, IN
Feb 23, 1989		No. 4 Indiana	L 65–76	13–11 (3–10)	Jenison Field House; East Lansing, MI
Feb 25, 1989		Northwestern	W 80–65	14–11 (4–10)	Jenison Field House; East Lansing, MI
Feb 27, 1989		No. 13 Michigan; Rivalry	L 52–79	14–12 (4–11)	Jenison Field House; East Lansing, MI
Mar 2, 1989		at No. 11 Iowa	W 83–81	15–12 (5–11)	Carver-Hawkeye Arena; Iowa City, IA
Mar 8, 1989		at Minnesota	L 61–77	15–13 (5–12)	Williams Arena; Minneapolis, MN
Mar 11, 1989		Wisconsin	W 70–61	16–13 (6–12)	Jenison Field House; East Lansing, MI
NIT
Mar 16, 1989*		Kent State first round	W 83–69	17–13	Cobo Arena; Detroit, MI
Mar 20, 1989*		Wichita State second round	W 79–67	18–13	Jenison Field House; East Lansing, MI
Mar 22, 1989*		at Villanova quarterfinals	W 70–63	19–13	The Pavilion; Villanova, PA
Mar 27, 1989*		vs. Saint Louis semifinals	L 64–74	19–14	Madison Square Garden; New York, NY
Mar 30, 1989*		vs. UAB third place game	L 76–78 ^{OT}	19–15	Madison Square Garden; New York, NY
*Non-conference game. ^{#}Rankings from AP Poll,. (#) Tournament seedings in parentheses. All times are in Central Time; Source.
