= Larry Smith (basketball, born 1968) =

Personal information
- Born: June 4, 1968 (age 58) Alton, Illinois
- Listed height: 6 ft 4 in (1.93 m)
- Listed weight: 195 lb (88 kg)

Career information
- High school: Alton (Alton, Illinois)
- College: Illinois (1986–1991)
- NBA draft: 1991: undrafted
- Position: Point guard

Career highlights
- Fourth-team Parade All-American (1986)

Larry Smith (born June 4, 1968) is an American former basketball player.

== High school career ==
At the conclusion of his senior year, Smith was a unanimous All-State pick while playing for Alton High School. He was named Co-News-Gazette Player of the Year with former University of Illinois great Nick Anderson. Smith was also named MVP in the Illinois Basketball Coaches Association All-Star game. Smith was also named a Street and Smith All-American at the conclusion of his senior year at Alton. During his high school playing time, Smith averaged 24.4 points, 4.9 rebounds, 8.0 assists and 4.1 steals per game in his senior season.

== College career ==
=== 1986-87 season ===
As a freshman, Smith appeared in 20 games while averaging 5.4 minutes. He totaled 38 points and dished out 16 assists.

=== 1987-88 season ===
During Smith's sophomore season, his playing time jumped to nearly 13 minutes per game, including five starts out of the 20 games he played. Amazingly, Smith played only 18 minutes against Chicago State, but scored 16 points on 6 of 8 shooting. Finally, he was third on the team with 80 assists.

=== 1988-89 season ===
Smith was an instrumental force in the 1988–89 Illinois Fighting Illini men's basketball team's drive to the Final Four. He started nine games during that season and played in all 36. Smith led the Fighting Illini in assists, dishing out 157 (4.4 per game) during that same season. His aggressive play off the bench sparked the Fighting Illini's running game while helping Illinois to a team average 86.4 points per game, its highest since 1966. Smith quarterbacked the Illinois offense in the stretch run, despite not being a starter. It was Smith who scored 12 points consecutively against Purdue and Ohio State, as Illinois kicked off a 10-game winning streak that included Big Ten wins over Indiana, Iowa and Michigan and five consecutive NCAA victories.

=== 1990-91 season ===
Smith experienced a redshirt season in 1989-90 which moved his fourth year of eligibility to the 1990-91 season. During that season, Smith was named a co-captain and started 29 of 31 games. He scored 394 total points while averaging 13.6 points per game. Smith made 24 of 63 three-point field goals and 90 of 129 free throws. He led the team in assists with 144, an average of 4.96 per game.

Season	Games	Points	PPG	Assists	Big Ten Record	Overall Record	Postseason
1986–87	20	38	1.9	16	13–2	23–8	NCAA First Round
1987–88	31	133	4.3	80	12–6	23–10	NCAA Second Round
1988–89	36	175	4.9	157	14–4	31–5	NCAA Final Four
1990–91	29	394	13.6	144	11–7	21–10	—
Totals	116	740	6.4	397	50–19	98–33	3 appearances
