= 1988–89 Michigan Wolverines men's basketball team =

American college basketball season

1988–89 Michigan Wolverines men's basketball

NCAA tournament National Champions Maui Classic champions

National Championship Game, W 80–79 ^{OT} vs. Seton Hall
- Conference: Big Ten Conference

Ranking
- Coaches: No. 10
- AP: No. 10
- Record: 30–7 (12–6 Big Ten)
- Head coach: Bill Frieder / Steve Fisher
- Assistant coaches: Mike Boyd; Steve Fisher; Brian Dutcher
- MVP: Glen Rice
- Captains: Glen Rice; Mark Hughes
- Home arena: Crisler Arena

1988–89 Big Ten Conference men's basketball standings
	Conf.				Overall
Team	W		L	PCT	W		L	PCT
No. 8 Indiana	15	–	3	.833	27	–	8	.771
No. 3 Illinois	14	–	4	.778	31	–	5	.861
No. 10 Michigan	12	–	6	.667	30	–	7	.811
No. 14 Iowa	10	–	8	.556	23	–	10	.697
Minnesota	9	–	9	.500	19	–	12	.613
Wisconsin	8	–	10	.444	18	–	12	.600
Purdue	8	–	10	.444	15	–	16	.484
Ohio State	6	–	12	.333	19	–	15	.559
Michigan State	6	–	12	.333	18	–	15	.545
Northwestern	2	–	16	.111	9	–	19	.321
Rankings from AP Poll

The 1988–89 Michigan Wolverines men's basketball team represented the University of Michigan in intercollegiate college basketball during the 1988–89 season. The head coach was Bill Frieder, who was dismissed before the 1989 NCAA Division I men's basketball tournament and replaced by assistant Steve Fisher. They played their home games at Crisler Arena in Ann Arbor, Michigan as members of the Big Ten Conference. They finished the season 30–7, 12–6 in Big Ten play to finish in third place. The Wolverines received an at-large bid to the NCAA tournament as the No. 3 seed in the Southeast region. They defeated Xavier and South Alabama to advance to the Sweet Sixteen. In the Sweet Sixteen, they defeated No. 5-ranked North Carolina and Virginia to advance to the Final Four. In the Final Four, they defeated fellow Big Ten member and No. 3-ranked Illinois to advance to the National Championship game. There they defeated No. 11 Seton Hall in overtime to win the school's first National Championship. This was Michigan’s last national championship until 2026.

== Previous season ==
The Wolverines finished the 1987–88 season 26–8, 13–5 in Big Ten play to finish in second place. They received an at-large bid to the NCAA tournament as a No. 3 seed. There they defeated Boise State and Florida to advance to the Sweet Sixteen before losing to North Carolina.

== Season summary ==
The team was ranked all eighteen weeks of the season in the Associated Press Top Twenty Poll where it began the season at number three, ended at number ten and peaked at number two. and it also ended the season ranked tenth in the final UPI Coaches' Poll.

The team repeated as the national statistical champion in team field goal percentage (56.6%, 1325 of 2341). During the season the team set numerous national and conference records. Glen Rice set the current Big Ten single-game three-point field goals percentage record against Wisconsin on February 25, 1989 (100% most made, 7 of 7). He also broke Mike McGee's Big Ten career points record with 2442, but that was eclipsed in 1993, although it remains the school record. The team set the following current Big Ten records: single-season points (3393), single-season field goals made (1325), single-season field goals attempted (2341), single-season field goal percentage (.566), single-season field goals percentage (conference games only, .561, 606 of 1,080), and single-season assists (745). Rice and Mark Hughes served as team co-captains and Rice earned team MVP. Rice was also recognized as a consensus All-American. Dave Balza was student manager.

Rice's 949 points established the current school single-season record, surpassing Cazzie Russell's 1966 record of 800. He also set the current school single-season field goals record of 363, surpassing Mike McGee. He set the current single-season three-point field goal percentage record of 51.56%, surpassing Gary Grant's previous season mark of 48.53%. Additionally, he set the school record for career and single-season three-point shots made with 135 and 99, respectively, that would last for ten years and eight years, respectively. He also set the current single-game field goal percentage record of 100% (7-for-7) against Wisconsin on February 25, 1989, surpassing Garde Thompson's 8-for-9 1986 performance. Loy Vaught also broke the Michigan single field goal percentage record of 62.18% that he set the prior year by reaching a 66.12%, which would stand as the record until 1995. For the third year in a row, the team established a new Michigan single-season scoring record with 3393 points. For the last of five consecutive seasons, the team set the school record for single-season field goal percentage on with a 56.6% (1325-for-2341) performance. This continues to be the school record. The team also set the current school single-season three-point field goal percentage record of 46.8% (196-for-419), surpassing the 1987 record, while setting a school record for three-point field goals made of 196 that would last until 1997. The team set the current school single-season free throws made record of 547, which surpassed the 1977 mark of 510. For the third of three consecutive seasons, the team set the school single-season total assist record with a total of 745, surpassing the prior total of 694 and establishing the current record. Rice ended his career with 134 games played, which surpassed Gary Grant's 1988 school record of 129 games. Vaught would surpass this record the following year.

The team earned numerous conference statistical championships. Rice won the scoring average championship for conference games only with a 24.8 average as well as the three-point shot championship with 55 in his conference games. Vaught won the field goal percentage title with a 67.7% mark. Terry Mills won the blocked shots championship with a 1.22 average in conference games. In addition, the team won scoring offense (87.8), scoring margin (10.3), field goal percentage (56.1%) and three-point field goals made (103).

During the six-game championship tournament run, Rice set the current NCAA Division I men's basketball tournament single-tournament records for points (184), field goals made (75), and three-point field goals made (27) as well as the career record for three-point field goal percentage (minimum 30 made, 56.5%, 35–62). In addition, Rumeal Robinson set the current championship game assists record (11 on April 3, 1989, vs. Seton Hall in overtime) as well as the current final four two-game assist record of 23. The team also set the final four two-game assist record of 42, which would be broken the following year.

In the 64-team NCAA Division I men's basketball tournament, number three seeded Michigan won the tournament by defeating the fourteen-seeded Xavier Musketeers 92–87, the six-seeded South Alabama 91–82, the two-seeded North Carolina, who had ousted them the prior two years, 92–87, the five-seeded Virginia 102–65, the one-seeded Illinois 83–81 and three-seeded Seton Hall 80–79 in overtime. Against North Carolina, the team set the school record of 13 three-point field goals made, which would last until February 22, 1998.

They became the first team in school history to win 30 games. They held the wins record until the 2018 team won 32 games making it to the Final Four. The team continues to rank second in NCAA history in single-season team field goal percentage: 56.6% (1325 of 2341).

== Roster ==
1988–89 Michigan Wolverines men's basketball team
Players
Coaches

Pos.	#	Name	Height	Weight	Year	Previous school	Hometown
G	13	Demetrius Calip	6 ft 1 in (1.85 m)	165 lb (75 kg)	So	Flint Northern	Flint, MI
G	20	Mike Griffin	6 ft 7 in (2.01 m)	215 lb (98 kg)	RS Jr	East Leyden	Rosemont, IL
G	21	Rumeal Robinson	6 ft 2 in (1.88 m)	195 lb (88 kg)	Jr	Cambridge Rindge and Latin	Cambridge, MA
G	23	Kirk Taylor	6 ft 3 in (1.91 m)	180 lb (82 kg)	So	missing	Dayton, Ohio
F	24	Sean Higgins	6 ft 9 in (2.06 m)	195 lb (88 kg)	So	Fairfax	Los Angeles, CA
G	25	Rob Pelinka	6 ft 5 in (1.96 m)	200 lb (91 kg)	Fr	Lake Forest	Lake Bluff, IL
G	30	Marc Koenig	6 ft 1 in (1.85 m)	185 lb (84 kg)	Jr	missing	Los Angeles, CA
F	32	James Voskuil	6 ft 7 in (2.01 m)	193 lb (88 kg)	Fr	Calvin Christian	Grand Rapids, MI
F	35	Loy Vaught	6 ft 9 in (2.06 m)	225 lb (102 kg)	RS Jr	East Kentwood	Grand Rapids, MI
F	41	Glen Rice	6 ft 7 in (2.01 m)	215 lb (98 kg)	Sr	Flint Northwestern	Flint, MI
C	42	Eric Riley	6 ft 10 in (2.08 m)	195 lb (88 kg)	Fr	St. Joseph	Cleveland, OH
G	45	Chris Seter	6 ft 9 in (2.06 m)	205 lb (93 kg)	Fr	missing	Brookfield, WI
F	52	Terry Mills	6 ft 10 in (2.08 m)	230 lb (104 kg)	Jr	Romulus	Romulus, MI
C	54	J.P. Oosterbaan	6 ft 10 in (2.08 m)	240 lb (109 kg)	Sr	Kalamazoo Christian	Kalamazoo, MI
C	55	Mark Hughes	6 ft 8 in (2.03 m)	235 lb (107 kg)	Sr	Muskegon Reeths-Puffer	Muskegon, MI

Head coach

- Steve Fisher

Assistant coach(es)

Legend

- (C) Team captain
- (S) Suspended
- (I) Ineligible
- (W) Walk-on
- Injured
- Current redshirt

== Schedule and results ==
Date time, TV	Rank^{#}	Opponent^{#}	Result	Record	Site city, state
Non-conference regular season
November 25*	No. 3	vs. Vanderbilt; Maui Classic quarterfinals	W 91–66	1–0	Lahaina Civic Center; Lahaina, HI
November 26*	No. 3	vs. Memphis State; Maui Classic semifinals	W 79–75	2–0	Lahaina Civic Center; Lahaina, HI
November 27*	No. 3	vs. No. 4 Oklahoma; Maui Classic championship	W 91–80	3–0	Lahaina Civic Center; Lahaina, HI
December 2*	No. 2	Grambling State	W 102–62	4–0	Crisler Arena; Ann Arbor, MI
December 3*	No. 2	South Dakota State	W 104–66	5–0	Crisler Arena; Ann Arbor, MI
December 5*	No. 2	Tampa	W 98–65	6–0	Crisler Arena; Ann Arbor, MI
December 7*	No. 2	Central Michigan	W 108–62	7–0	Crisler Arena; Ann Arbor, MI
December 10*	No. 2	at Western Michigan	W 107–60	8–0	University Arena; Kalamazoo, MI
December 12*	No. 2	Eastern Michigan	W 80–57	9–0	Crisler Arena; Ann Arbor, MI
December 20*	No. 2	Northern Michigan	W 125–75	10–0	Crisler Arena; Ann Arbor, MI
December 21*	No. 2	Youngstown State	W 121–72	11–0	Crisler Arena; Ann Arbor, MI
December 28*	No. 2	vs. Alaska-Anchorage; Utah Basketball Classic	L 66–70	11–1	Jon M. Huntsman Center; Salt Lake City, UT
December 29*	No. 2	vs. Holy Cross; Utah Basketball Classic	W 100–63	12–1	Jon M. Huntsman Center; Salt Lake City, UT
Big Ten regular season
January 7	No. 7	Northwestern	W 94–66	13–1 (1–0)	Crisler Arena; Ann Arbor, MI
January 12	No. 6	Minnesota	W 98–83	14–1 (2–0)	Crisler Arena; Ann Arbor, MI
January 14	No. 6	at No. 2 Illinois	L 84–96	14–2 (2–1)	Assembly Hall (14,499); Champaign, IL
January 16	No. 6	No. 18 Ohio State; Rivalry	W 99–73	15–2 (3–1)	Crisler Arena; Ann Arbor, MI
January 21	No. 6	at Wisconsin	L 68–71	15–3 (3–2)	UW Fieldhouse; Madison, WI
January 23	No. 6	No. 19 Indiana	L 70–71	15–4 (3–3)	Crisler Arena; Ann Arbor, MI
January 29	No. 10	at Purdue	W 99–88	16–4 (4–3)	Mackey Arena; West Lafayette, IN
February 4	No. 11	Michigan State; Rivalry	W 82–66	17–4 (5–3)	Crisler Arena; Ann Arbor, MI
February 9	No. 10	at No. 8 Iowa	W 108–107 ^{2OT}	18–4 (6–3)	Carver-Hawkeye Arena; Iowa City, IA
February 11	No. 10	at Minnesota	L 80–88	18–5 (6–4)	Williams Arena; Minneapolis, MN
February 16	No. 13	Purdue	W 84–70	19–5 (7–4)	Crisler Arena; Ann Arbor, MI
February 19	No. 13	at No. 9 Indiana	L 75–76	19–6 (7–5)	Assembly Hall; Bloomington, IN
February 23	No. 13	at Ohio State; Rivalry	W 89–72	20–6 (8–5)	St. John's Arena; Columbus, OH
February 25	No. 13	Wisconsin	W 92–70	21–6 (9–5)	Crisler Arena; Ann Arbor, MI
February 27	No. 13	at Michigan State; Rivalry	W 79–52	22–6 (10–5)	Jenison Fieldhouse; East Lansing, MI
March 4	No. 10	No. 11 Iowa	W 119–96	23–6 (11–5)	Crisler Arena; Ann Arbor, MI
March 9	No. 8	at Northwestern	W 88–79	24–6 (12–5)	Welsh-Ryan Arena; Evanston, IL
March 11	No. 8	No. 4 Illinois	L 73–89	24–7 (12–6)	Crisler Arena (13,609); Ann Arbor, MI
NCAA tournament
March 17*	(3 SE) No. 10	vs. (14 SE) Xavier; First Round	W 92–87	25–7	The Omni; Atlanta, GA
March 19*	(3 SE) No. 10	vs. (11 SE) South Alabama; Second Round	W 91–82	26–7	The Omni; Atlanta, GA
March 23*	(3 SE) No. 10	vs. (2 SE) No. 5 North Carolina; Sweet Sixteen	W 92–87	27–7	Rupp Arena; Lexington, KY
March 25*	(3 SE) No. 10	vs. (5 SE) Virginia; Elite Eight	W 102–65	28–7	Rupp Arena; Lexington, KY
April 1*	(3 SE) No. 10	vs. (1 MW) No. 3 Illinois; Final Four	W 83–81	29–7	Kingdome (39,187); Seattle, WA
April 3*	(3 SE) No. 10	vs. (3 W) No. 11 Seton Hall; NCAA Championship	W 80–79 ^{OT}	30–7	Kingdome; Seattle, WA
*Non-conference game. ^{#}Rankings from AP Poll. (#) Tournament seedings in parentheses. SE=Southeast.

== Rankings ==
Ranking movements Legend: ██ Increase in ranking ██ Decrease in ranking
	Week																	
Poll	Pre	1	2	3	4	5	6	7	8	9	10	11	12	13	14	15	16	Final
AP Poll	3	3	2	2	2	2	2	7	6	6	10	11	10	13	13	10	8	10

== Statistics ==
The team posted the following statistics:

Name	GP	GS	Min	Avg	FG	FGA	FG%	3FG	3FGA	3FG%	FT	FTA	FT%	OR	DR	RB	Avg	Ast	Avg	PF	DQ	TO	Stl	Blk	Pts	Avg
Glen Rice	37	37			363	629	0.577	99	192	0.516	124	149	0.832	77	155	232	6.3	85	2.3	75	1	81	39	11	949	25.6
Rumeal Robinson	37	36			199	357	0.557	30	64	0.469	122	186	0.656	31	94	125	3.4	233	6.3	105	5	131	70	4	550	14.9
Loy Vaught	37	21			201	304	0.661	2	5	0.400	63	81	0.778	94	202	296	8.0	36	1.0	94	3	50	19	11	467	12.6
Terry Mills	37	37			180	319	0.564	0	2	0.000	70	91	0.769	75	144	219	5.9	104	2.8	95	3	77	20	49	430	11.6
Sean Higgins	34	16			158	312	0.506	51	110	0.464	54	70	0.771	31	76	107	3.1	51	1.5	76	2	60	10	11	421	12.4
Mark Hughes	35	4			104	171	0.608	1	2	0.500	29	48	0.604	41	101	142	4.1	40	1.1	60	0	26	11	7	238	6.8
Michael Griffin	37	31			33	63	0.524	0	2	0.000	33	43	0.767	24	65	89	2.4	103	2.8	104	3	56	23	9	99	2.7
Kirk Taylor	21	2			33	69	0.478	7	18	0.389	21	36	0.583	12	34	46	2.2	46	2.2	30	1	23	20	6	94	4.5
Demetrius Calip	30	0	229	7.6	22	50	0.440	2	9	0.222	14	17	0.824	5	14	19	0.6	25	0.8	20	0	23	7	0	60	2.0
J.P. Oosterbaan	23	0			22	39	0.564	0	1	0.000	9	13	0.692	9	18	27	1.2	11	0.5	15	0	9	0	3	53	2.3
Rob Pelinka	24	1	108	4.5	9	25	0.360	4	14	0.286	7	10	0.700	5	10	15	0.6	10	0.4	7	0	12	3	2	29	1.2
Marc Koenig	6	0	9	1.5	1	1	1.000	0	0		0	0		0	1	1	0.2	1	0.2	1	0	3	2	0	2	0.3
TEAM	37													20	63	83	2.2					6				
Season Total	37				1325	2339	0.566	196	419	0.468	546	744	0.734	424	977	1401	37.9	745	20.1	682	18	557	224	113	3392	91.7
Opponents	37				1055	2322	0.454	164	466	0.352	493	710	0.694	411	699	1110	30.0	514	13.9	705	17	568	227	36	2767	74.8

== Awards and honors ==
- Glen Rice, NCAA Men's MOP Award

== Team players drafted into the NBA ==
Five players from this team were selected in the NBA draft.

Year	Round	Pick	Overall	Player	NBA club
1989	1	4	4	Glen Rice	Miami Heat
1990	1	10	10	Rumeal Robinson	Atlanta Hawks
1990	1	13	13	Loy Vaught	Los Angeles Clippers
1990	1	16	16	Terry Mills	Milwaukee Bucks
1990	2	27	54	Sean Higgins	San Antonio Spurs
