= 1988–89 Illinois Fighting Illini men's basketball team =

American college basketball season

1988–89 Illinois Fighting Illini men's basketball

Illini Classic, Champion Rainbow Classic, Champion

NCAA men's Division I tournament, Final Four
- Conference: Big Ten Conference

Ranking
- Coaches: No. 3
- AP: No. 3
- Record: 31–5 (14–4 Big Ten)
- Head coach: Lou Henson (14th season)
- Assistant coaches: Dick Nagy (10th season); Jimmy Collins (6th season); Mark Coomes (4th season)
- MVP: Nick Anderson
- Captains: Kenny Battle; Lowell Hamilton
- Home arena: Assembly Hall

1988–89 Big Ten Conference men's basketball standings
	Conf.				Overall
Team	W		L	PCT	W		L	PCT
No. 8 Indiana	15	–	3	.833	27	–	8	.771
No. 3 Illinois	14	–	4	.778	31	–	5	.861
No. 10 Michigan	12	–	6	.667	30	–	7	.811
No. 14 Iowa	10	–	8	.556	23	–	10	.697
Minnesota	9	–	9	.500	19	–	12	.613
Wisconsin	8	–	10	.444	18	–	12	.600
Purdue	8	–	10	.444	15	–	16	.484
Ohio State	6	–	12	.333	19	–	15	.559
Michigan State	6	–	12	.333	18	–	15	.545
Northwestern	2	–	16	.111	9	–	19	.321
Rankings from AP Poll

The 1988–89 Illinois Fighting Illini men's basketball team represented the University of Illinois.

== Regular season ==
The 1988–89 team may have been the most talented team ever assembled at the University of Illinois. The team was so athletic that they could "run and alley-oop" baskets using even the non-starting players, and a record number of 100+ game scores reflected this fact. The players known as the “Flying Illini,” included all the important pieces from the 1987-88 squad (Kenny Battle, Kendall Gill, Steve Bardo, Lowell Hamilton, Nick Anderson and Larry Smith) as well as junior college All-American P.J. Bowman and former high school All-American Marcus Liberty. The Fighting Illini won their first 16 games and were ranked No. 2 in the nation going into a nationally televised game against Georgia Tech, whom Illinois had already beaten, 80–75, at the Rainbow Classic in December. The Yellow Jackets led, 47–31, but Illinois managed to surge back to force overtime, eventually needing two extra periods to win the game. Along with the No. 1 ranking the next day came some bad news. Illinois’ catalyst, Gill, had broken a bone in his foot and would miss the next 12 games. Hurt by the loss of Gill, Illinois lost three of the next four games and its No. 1 ranking. The Illini rallied to finish second in the Big Ten with a 14–4 record and with Gill back in the lineup, the Illini were awarded a No. 1 seed in the Midwest Region of the NCAA tournament. After rolling to victories over McNeese State and Ball State at the Hoosier Dome, a powerpacked regional in Minneapolis with Missouri, Louisville and Syracuse, stood in the way of Illinois’ trip to the Final Four. Louisville fell victim to Illinois, losing 83–69, which set up a regional final matchup with Syracuse. The Fighting Illini held off Syracuse to advance to the Final Four in Seattle where Illinois faced Michigan, a team it had beaten twice already in conference play, in the national semifinals. Michigan was inspired by the firing of their coach prior to the tournament, and won a game that contained 33 lead changes. Despite Battle's 29-point, 11-rebound effort, Illinois fell to eventual national-champion Michigan, 83–81.

=== Roster ===
1988–89 Illinois Fighting Illini men's basketball team
Players
Coaches

Pos.	#	Name	Height	Weight	Year	Previous school	Hometown
G	10	P.J. Bowman	5 ft 10 in (1.78 m)	170 lb (77 kg)	Jr	Centennial High School	Champaign, Illinois
G	13	Kendall Gill	6 ft 4 in (1.93 m)	180 lb (82 kg)	Jr	Rich Central High School	Matteson, Illinois
G	15	Travis Smith	5 ft 11 in (1.8 m)	175 lb (79 kg)	So	Gallatin High School	Ridgway, Illinois
G	22	Eddie Manzke	6 ft 2 in (1.88 m)	170 lb (77 kg)	Sr	Marist High School	Orland Park, Illinois
G	23	Larry Smith	6 ft 4 in (1.93 m)	190 lb (86 kg)	Jr	Alton High School	Alton, Illinois
F	24	Ervin Small	6 ft 7 in (2.01 m)	215 lb (98 kg)	Jr	Simeon High School	Chicago, Illinois
G/F	25	Nick Anderson	6 ft 6 in (1.98 m)	215 lb (98 kg)	Jr	Simeon High School	Chicago, Illinois
G	30	Marcus Liberty	6 ft 8 in (2.03 m)	190 lb (86 kg)	So	King High School	Chicago, Illinois
G/F	32	Brian O'Connell	6 ft 4 in (1.93 m)	195 lb (88 kg)	Jr	Schaumburg High School	Schaumburg, Illinois
F	33	Kenny Battle (C)	6 ft 5 in (1.96 m)	210 lb (95 kg)	RS Sr	West Aurora High School	Aurora, Illinois
F	34	Andy Kaufmann	6 ft 6 in (1.98 m)	210 lb (95 kg)	Fr	Jacksonville High School	Jacksonville, Illinois
G/F	35	Stephen Bardo	6 ft 6 in (1.98 m)	200 lb (91 kg)	Jr	Carbondale Community High School	Carbondale, Illinois
F	50	Mike MacDonald	6 ft 6 in (1.98 m)	210 lb (95 kg)	Sr	Streamwood High School	Streamwood, Illinois
F/C	45	Lowell Hamilton (C)	6 ft 7 in (2.01 m)	210 lb (95 kg)	Sr	Providence St. Mel High School	Chicago, Illinois

Head coach

- Lou Henson (New Mexico State University) (14th year)

Assistant coach(es)

- Jimmy Collins (New Mexico State) (6th year)
- Dick Nagy (Hardin-Simmons University) (10th year)
- Mark Coomes (New Mexico State) (4th year)

Legend

- (C) Team captain
- (S) Suspended
- (I) Ineligible
- (W) Walk-on
- Injured
- Current redshirt

Roster

== Schedule ==
Date time, TV	Rank^{#}	Opponent^{#}	Result	Record	Site (attendance) city, state
Non-Conference regular season
11/26/1988*; 7 p.m., WCIA	No. 9	Illinois-Chicago	W 85-59	1-0	Assembly Hall (13,800); Champaign, IL
11/29/1988*; 7 p.m., WCIA	No. 7	Metro State	W 86-55	2-0	Assembly Hall (13,911); Champaign, IL
12/3/1988*; 7 p.m., WCIA	No. 7	Ole Miss	W 91-79	3-0	Assembly Hall (14,386); Champaign, IL
12/6/1988*; 8:30 p.m., ESPN	No. 7	No. 19 Florida	W 97-67	4-0	Assembly Hall (15,020); Champaign, IL
12/9/1988*; 7 p.m., WCIA	No. 7	Duquesne; Illini Classic	W 112-81	5-0	Assembly Hall (14,532); Champaign, IL
12/10/1988*; 8 p.m., WCIA	No. 7	Arkansas-Little Rock; Illini Classic	W 107-88	6-0	Assembly Hall (14,887); Champaign, IL
12/17/1988*; 7 p.m., WCIA	No. 6	Tennessee Tech	W 105-77	7-0	Assembly Hall (12,794); Champaign, IL
12/19/1988*; 8 p.m., WCIA	No. 6	vs. No. 10 Missouri; Braggin' Rights	W 87-84	8-0	St. Louis Arena (18,561); St. Louis, MO
12/22/1988*; 7:30 p.m., WCIA	No. 5	at Louisiana State	W 127-100	9-0	Pete Maravich Assembly Center (14,192); Baton Rouge, LA
12/28/1988*; 10 p.m., none	No. 4	vs. Tulsa; Rainbow Classic	W 85-58	10-0	Neal S. Blaisdell Center (3,173); Honolulu, HI
12/29/1988*; 6 p.m., none	No. 4	vs. No. 17 Georgia Tech; Rainbow Classic	W 80-75	11-0	Neal S. Blaisdell Center (5,775); Honolulu, HI
12/31/1988*; 12:15 a.m., none	No. 4	at Hawaii; Rainbow Classic	W 96-87	12-0	Neal S. Blaisdell Center (6,379); Honolulu, HI
Big Ten regular season
1/7/1989; 7 p.m., WCIA	No. 3	Michigan State	W 71-54	13-0 (1-0)	Assembly Hall (16,497); Champaign, IL
1/12/1989; 7 p.m., WCIA	No. 2	Wisconsin	W 103-80	14-0 (2-0)	Assembly Hall (14,433); Champaign, IL
1/14/1989; 12 p.m., WCIA	No. 2	No. 6 Michigan	W 96-84	15-0 (3-0)	Assembly Hall (14,499); Champaign, IL
1/19/1989; 9 p.m., ESPN	No. 2	at Northwestern; Rivalry	W 75-70	16-0 (4-0)	McGaw Hall (8,117); Evanston, IL
1/22/1989*; 12 p.m., ABC	No. 2	Georgia Tech	W 103-92 ^{2OT}	17-0	Assembly Hall (16,561); Champaign, IL
1/26/1989; 7 p.m., WCIA	No. 1	at Minnesota	L 62-69	17-1 (4-1)	Williams Arena (13,766); Minneapolis, MN
1/28/1989; 7 p.m., WCIA	No. 1	No. 16 Indiana; Rivalry	W 75-65	18-1 (5-1)	Assembly Hall (16,563); Champaign, IL
2/2/1989; 7 p.m., WCIA	No. 2	at Purdue	L 72-76	18-2 (5-2)	Mackey Arena (14,123); West Lafayette, IN
2/5/1989; 3 p.m., ABC	No. 2	at No. 9 Iowa; Rivalry	L 82-86	18-3 (5-3)	Carver–Hawkeye Arena (15,500); Iowa City, IA
2/9/1989; 7 p.m., WCIA	No. 7	No. 16 Ohio State	W 62-60	19-3 (6-3)	Assembly Hall (16,439); Champaign, IL
2/11/1989; 7 p.m., WCIA	No. 7	Northwestern; Rivalry	W 86-69	20-3 (7-3)	Assembly Hall (16,471); Champaign, IL
2/16/1989; 7 p.m., WCIA	No. 5	at Michigan State	W 75-56	21-3 (8-3)	Jenison Fieldhouse (10,004); East Lansing, MI
2/18/1989; 7 p.m., WCIA	No. 5	at Wisconsin	L 52-72	21-4 (8-4)	Wisconsin Field House (11,886); Madison, WI
2/20/1989; 8:30 p.m., ESPN	No. 5	Purdue	W 102-75	22-4 (9-4)	Assembly Hall (16,415); Champaign, IL
2/26/1989; 3 p.m., ABC	No. 10	at Ohio State	W 94-71	23-4 (10-4)	St. John Arena (13,276); Columbus, OH
3/2/1989; 7 p.m., WCIA	No. 8	Minnesota	W 63-58	24-4 (11-4)	Assembly Hall (16,455); Champaign, IL
3/5/1989; 3 p.m., ABC	No. 8	at No. 3 Indiana; Rivalry	W 70-67	25-4 (12-4)	Assembly Hall (17,311); Bloomington, IN
3/8/1989; 9 p.m., ESPN	No. 4	No. 15 Iowa; Rivalry	W 118-94	26-4 (13-4)	Assembly Hall (16,552); Champaign, IL
3/11/1989; 3 p.m., ABC	No. 4	at No. 8 Michigan	W 89-73	27-4 (14-4)	Crisler Arena (13,609); Ann Arbor, MI
NCAA tournament
3/16/1989*; 6 p.m., CBS	(1 MW) No. 3	vs. (16 MW) McNeese State; First Round	W 77-71	28-4	Hoosier Dome (37,242); Indianapolis, IN
3/18/1989*; 1:20 p.m., CBS	(1 MW) No. 3	vs. (9 MW) No. 18 Ball State; Second Round	W 72-60	29-4	Hoosier Dome (37,444); Indianapolis, IN
3/24/1989*; 7 p.m., CBS	(1 MW) No. 3	vs. (4 MW) No. 12 Louisville; Regional semifinals	W 83-69	30-4	Metrodome (33,560); Minneapolis, MN
3/26/1989*; 1 p.m., CBS	(1 MW) No. 3	vs. (2 MW) No. 7 Syracuse; Regional Finals	W 89-86	31-4	Metrodome (33,469); Minneapolis, MN
4/1/1989*; 7 p.m., CBS	(1 MW) No. 3	vs. (3 S) No. 10 Michigan; National semifinals	L 81-83	31-5	Kingdome (39,187); Seattle, WA
*Non-conference game. ^{#}Rankings from AP Poll. (#) Tournament seedings in parentheses. All times are in Central Time.

== Player stats ==
Player	Games Played	Minutes Played	2 pt. Field Goals	3 pt. Field Goals	Free Throws	Rebounds	Assists	Blocks	Steals	Points
Nick Anderson	36	1125	238	24	99	285	72	32	57	647
Kenny Battle	36	1105	209	9	151	174	64	13	89	596
Lowell Hamilton	36	943	219	0	50	204	24	31	21	488
Kendall Gill	24	681	105	38	46	70	91	6	51	370
Marcus Liberty	36	748	114	6	57	141	42	10	38	303
Stephen Bardo	36	1000	65	29	76	144	148	8	34	293
Larry Smith	36	695	63	3	40	73	157	5	28	175
P.J. Bowman	29	284	6	22	9	28	26	1	7	87
Ervin Small	36	392	26	0	27	76	5	0	10	77
Andy Kaufmann	12	136	11	5	14	20	8	1	5	51
Mike MacDonald	23	60	7	0	1	10	1	0	1	15
Brian O'Connell	4	5	1	0	2	3	0	0	0	4
Eddie Manzke	18	25	0	0	1	2	0	0	0	1

- Head Coach Lou Henson (14th year at Illinois)

== Awards and honors ==
- Stephen Bardo
  - Big Ten Defensive Player of the Year
- Nick Anderson
  - Team Most Valuable Player
  - NCAA Tournament Regional Most Outstanding Player
  - Fighting Illini All-Century team (2005)
- Kenny Battle
  - Fighting Illini All-Century team (2005)
- Kendall Gill
  - Fighting Illini All-Century team (2005)

== Team players drafted into the NBA ==
Player	NBA Club	Round	Pick
Kendall Gill	Charlotte Hornets	1	5
Nick Anderson	Orlando Magic	1	11
Kenny Battle	Detroit Pistons	2	27
