= 1988–89 Indiana Hoosiers men's basketball team =

American college basketball season

1988–89 Indiana Hoosiers men's basketball

Big Ten Champions

NCAA men's Division I tournament, Sweet Sixteen
- Conference: Big Ten Conference

Ranking
- Coaches: No. 6
- AP: No. 8
- Record: 27–8 (15–3 Big Ten)
- Head coach: Bobby Knight (18th season)
- Captain: Joe Hillman
- Home arena: Assembly Hall

1988–89 Big Ten Conference men's basketball standings
	Conf.				Overall
Team	W		L	PCT	W		L	PCT
No. 8 Indiana	15	–	3	.833	27	–	8	.771
No. 3 Illinois	14	–	4	.778	31	–	5	.861
No. 10 Michigan	12	–	6	.667	30	–	7	.811
No. 14 Iowa	10	–	8	.556	23	–	10	.697
Minnesota	9	–	9	.500	19	–	12	.613
Wisconsin	8	–	10	.444	18	–	12	.600
Purdue	8	–	10	.444	15	–	16	.484
Ohio State	6	–	12	.333	19	–	15	.559
Michigan State	6	–	12	.333	18	–	15	.545
Northwestern	2	–	16	.111	9	–	19	.321
Rankings from AP Poll

The 1988–89 Indiana Hoosiers men's basketball team represented Indiana University. Their head coach was Bobby Knight, who was in his 18th year. The team played its home games in Assembly Hall in Bloomington, Indiana, and was a member of the Big Ten Conference.

The Hoosiers finished the regular season with an overall record of 27–8 and a conference record of 15–3, finishing 1st in the Big Ten Conference. As the Big Ten Conference Champions, the Hoosiers were invited to participate in the 1989 NCAA tournament as a #2 seed. Indiana made it to the Sweet Sixteen, where they lost to Seton Hall.

== Roster ==
No.	Name	Position	Ht.	Year	Hometown
3	Jay Edwards	G/F	6–4	So.	Marion, Indiana
4	Lyndon Jones	G	6–2	So.	Marion, Indiana
5	Chuckie White	F	6–7	Jr.	Charlotte, North Carolina
10	Mark Robinson	F	6–5	Jr.	Van Nuys, California
11	Todd Jadlow	F/C	6–9	Sr.	Salina, Kansas
14	Magnus Pelkowski	C	6–10	Sr.	Bogotá, Colombia
21	Mike D'Aloisio	G	6–4	Sr.	Hillsborough, California
23	Jamal Meeks	G	6–1	Fr.	Freeport, Illinois
24	Matt Nover	F/C	6–8	RS Fr.	Chesterton, Indiana
32	Eric Anderson	F/C	6–9	Fr.	Chicago, Illinois
35	Jeff Oliphant	G	6–5	Jr.	Lyons, Indiana
42	Kreigh Smith	G/F	6–7	Sr.	Tipton, Indiana
44	Joe Hillman	G	6–2	Sr.	Glendale, California
45	Brian Sloan	F/C	6–8	Sr.	McLeansboro, Illinois

== Schedule/results ==
Date time, TV	Rank^{#}	Opponent^{#}	Result	Record	Site city, state
Regular season
11/18/1988*		Illinois State; Preseason NIT First Round	W 83–48	1–0	Assembly Hall; Bloomington, Indiana
11/20/1988*		Stanford; Preseason NIT Second Round	W 84–73	2–0	Assembly Hall; Bloomington, Indiana
11/23/1988*; ESPN	No. 20	vs. No. 6 Syracuse; Preseason NIT Semifinals	L 78–102	2–1	Madison Square Garden; New York City
11/25/1988*; ESPN	No. 20	vs. North Carolina; Preseason NIT consolation round	L 92–106	2–2	Madison Square Garden; New York City
11/29/1988*		at Miami (OH)	W 87–70	3–2	Millett Hall; Oxford, Ohio
12/3/1988*		vs. No. 13 Louisville	L 79–101	3–3	Hoosier Dome; Indianapolis
12/6/1988*		at Notre Dame	L 71–84	3–4	Joyce Center; Notre Dame, Indiana
12/9/1988*		VCU; Indiana Classic	W 85–68	4–4	Assembly Hall; Bloomington, Indiana
12/10/1988*		Santa Clara; Indiana Classic	W 64–49	5–4	Assembly Hall; Bloomington, Indiana
12/14/1988*		Arkansas-Little Rock	W 105–77	6–4	Assembly Hall; Bloomington, Indiana
12/17/1988*		UTEP	W 81–63	7–4	Assembly Hall; Bloomington, Indiana
12/20/1988*		at Kentucky; Indiana–Kentucky rivalry	W 75–52	8–4	Rupp Arena; Lexington, Kentucky
12/28/1988*		vs. St. Bonaventure; Hoosier Classic	W 103–66	9–4	Market Square Arena; Indianapolis
12/29/1988*		vs. Utah State; Hoosier Classic	W 73–61	10–4	Market Square Arena; Indianapolis
1/4/1989		No. 14 Ohio State	W 75–65	11–4 (1–0)	Assembly Hall; Bloomington, Indiana
1/9/1989		at Purdue; Rivalry	W 74–73	12–4 (2–0)	Mackey Arena; West Lafayette, Indiana
1/14/1989		Northwestern	W 92–76	13–4 (3–0)	Assembly Hall; Bloomington, Indiana
1/19/1989	No. 19	at Wisconsin	W 61–58	14–4 (4–0)	Wisconsin Field House; Madison, Wisconsin
1/21/1989	No. 19	Michigan State	W 75–60	15–4 (5–0)	Assembly Hall; Bloomington, Indiana
1/23/1989	No. 19	at No. 6 Michigan	W 71–70	16–4 (6–0)	Crisler Arena; Ann Arbor, Michigan
1/28/1989	No. 16	at No. 1 Illinois; Rivalry	L 65–75	16–5 (6–1)	Assembly Hall; Champaign, Illinois
1/30/1989	No. 16	No. 12 Iowa	W 104–89	17–5 (7–1)	Assembly Hall; Bloomington, Indiana
2/4/1989	No. 17	Minnesota	W 66–62	18–5 (8–1)	Assembly Hall; Bloomington, Indiana
2/9/1989	No. 13	at Northwestern	W 72–56	19–5 (9–1)	Welsh-Ryan Arena; Evanston, Illinois
2/12/1989; ABC	No. 13	Purdue; Rivalry	W 64–62	20–5 (10–1)	Assembly Hall; Bloomington, Indiana
2/19/1989; ABC	No. 9	No. 13 Michigan	W 76–75	21–5 (11–1)	Assembly Hall; Bloomington, Indiana
2/23/1989	No. 4	at Michigan State	W 76–65	22–5 (12–1)	Jenison Fieldhouse; East Lansing, Michigan
2/25/1989	No. 4	at Minnesota	W 75–62	23–5 (13–1)	Williams Arena; Minneapolis
3/1/1989	No. 3	at Ohio State	W 73–66	24–5 (14–1)	St. John Arena; Columbus, Ohio
3/5/1989; ABC	No. 3	No. 8 Illinois; Rivalry	L 67–70	24–6 (14–2)	Assembly Hall; Bloomington, Indiana
3/9/1989	No. 6	Wisconsin	W 75–64	25–6 (15–2)	Assembly Hall; Bloomington, Indiana
3/11/1989	No. 6	at No. 15 Iowa	L 70–87	25–7 (15–3)	Carver–Hawkeye Arena; Iowa City, Iowa
NCAA tournament
3/17/1989*; ESPN/NCAAP	(2 W) No. 8	vs. (15 W) George Mason; First Round	W 99–85	26–7 (15–3)	McKale Center; Tucson, Arizona
3/19/1989*; CBS	(2 W) No. 8	vs. (7 W) UTEP; Second Round	W 92–69	27–7 (15–3)	McKale Center; Tucson, Arizona
3/23/1989*; CBS	(2 W) No. 8	vs. (3 W) No. 11 Seton Hall; Sweet Sixteen	L 65–78	27–8 (15–3)	McNichols Sports Arena; Denver
*Non-conference game. ^{#}Rankings from AP Poll. (#) Tournament seedings in parentheses. W=West.
