= 1988–89 Minnesota Golden Gophers men's basketball team =

American college basketball season

1988–89 Minnesota Golden Gophers men's basketball

NCAA tournament, Sweet 16
- Conference: Big Ten Conference
- Record: 19–12 (9–9 Big Ten)
- Head coach: Clem Haskins (3rd season)
- Home arena: Williams Arena

1988–89 Big Ten Conference men's basketball standings
	Conf.				Overall
Team	W		L	PCT	W		L	PCT
No. 8 Indiana	15	–	3	.833	27	–	8	.771
No. 3 Illinois	14	–	4	.778	31	–	5	.861
No. 10 Michigan	12	–	6	.667	30	–	7	.811
No. 14 Iowa	10	–	8	.556	23	–	10	.697
Minnesota	9	–	9	.500	19	–	12	.613
Wisconsin	8	–	10	.444	18	–	12	.600
Purdue	8	–	10	.444	15	–	16	.484
Ohio State	6	–	12	.333	19	–	15	.559
Michigan State	6	–	12	.333	18	–	15	.545
Northwestern	2	–	16	.111	9	–	19	.321
Rankings from AP Poll

The 1988–89 Minnesota Golden Gophers men's basketball team represented the University of Minnesota during the 1988–89 NCAA Division I men's basketball season. Led by third-year head coach Clem Haskins, the Golden Gophers advanced to the Sweet 16 of the NCAA tournament and finished with a 19–12 record (9–9 Big Ten).

== Roster ==
1988–89 Minnesota Golden Gophers men's basketball team
Players
Coaches

Pos.	#	Name	Height	Weight	Year	Hometown
G	3	Kevin Lynch	6 ft 5 in (1.96 m)	195 lb (88 kg)	So	Bloomington, Minnesota
G	20	Melvin Newbern	6 ft 4 in (1.93 m)	200 lb (91 kg)	So	Toledo, Ohio
F	33	Richard Coffey	6 ft 6 in (1.98 m)	210 lb (95 kg)	Jr	Aurora, North Carolina
F	34	Willie Burton	6 ft 8 in (2.03 m)	210 lb (95 kg)	Jr	Detroit, Michigan
G	40	Walter Bond	6 ft 5 in (1.96 m)	200 lb (91 kg)	So	Chicago, Illinois
F/C	45	Jim Shikenjanski	6 ft 9 in (2.06 m)	—	Jr
C		Bob Martin	7 ft 0 in (2.13 m)	250 lb (113 kg)	Fr

Head coach

- Clem Haskins (Western Kentucky)

Assistant coach(es)

Legend

- (C) Team captain
- (S) Suspended
- (I) Ineligible
- (W) Walk-on
- Injured
- Current redshirt

== Schedule and results ==
Date time, TV	Rank^{#}	Opponent^{#}	Result	Record	Site city, state
Non-conference regular season
Nov 26, 1989*		Ball State	L 57–63 ^{OT}	0–1	Williams Arena; Minneapolis, MN
Nov 29, 1989*		Youngstown State	W 97–64	1–1	Williams Arena; Minneapolis, MN
Dec 3, 1989*		Maryland Eastern Shore	W 112–68	2–1	Williams Arena; Minneapolis, MN
Dec 10, 1989*		Florida International	W 99–75	3–1	Williams Arena; Minneapolis, MN
Dec 13, 1989*		at Drake	L 52–66	3–2	Veterans Memorial Auditorium; Des Moines, IA
Dec 17, 1989*		at Marquette	W 83–67	4–2	Bradley Center; Milwaukee, WI
Dec 21, 1989*		Detroit Mercy	W 93–69	5–2	Williams Arena; Minneapolis, MN
Dec 23, 1989*		at Northern Illinois	W 93–74	6–2	Chick Evans Field House; DeKalb, IL
Dec 30, 1989*		Denver	W 99–54	7–2	Williams Arena; Minneapolis, MN
Big Ten regular season
Jan 4, 1989		at Wisconsin	L 67–75	7–3 (0–1)	Wisconsin Field House; Madison, WI
Jan 7, 1989*		Kansas State	W 72–67	8–3	Williams Arena; Minneapolis, MN
Jan 12, 1989		at No. 6 Michigan	L 83–98	8–4 (0–2)	Crisler Arena; Ann Arbor, MI
Jan 14, 1989		No. 5 Iowa	W 80–78	9–4 (1–2)	Williams Arena; Minneapolis, MN
Jan 18, 1989		Purdue	W 76–66	10–4 (2–2)	Williams Arena; Minneapolis, MN
Jan 21, 1989		at Northwestern	L 67–75	10–5 (2–3)	Welsh-Ryan Arena; Evanston, IL
Jan 26, 1989		No. 1 Illinois	W 69–62	11–5 (3–3)	Williams Arena (13,766); Minneapolis, MN
Jan 28, 1989		at Michigan State	L 64–73	11–6 (3–4)	Jenison Field House; East Lansing, MI
Feb 1, 1989		No. 17 Ohio State	W 76–73	12–6 (4–4)	Williams Arena; Minneapolis, MN
Feb 4, 1989		at No. 17 Indiana	L 62–66	12–7 (4–5)	Assembly Hall; Bloomington, IN
Feb 8, 1989		Wisconsin	W 59–58	13–7 (5–5)	Williams Arena; Minneapolis, MN
Feb 11, 1989		Michigan	W 88–80	14–7 (6–5)	Williams Arena; Minneapolis, MN
Feb 18, 1989		at No. 14 Iowa	L 61–99	14–8 (6–6)	Carver-Hawkeye Arena; Iowa City, IA
Feb 23, 1989		at Purdue	L 63–78	14–9 (6–7)	Mackey Arena; West Lafayette, IN
Feb 25, 1989		No. 4 Indiana	L 62–75	14–10 (6–8)	Williams Arena; Minneapolis, MN
Mar 2, 1989		at No. 8 Illinois	L 58–63	14–11 (6–9)	Assembly Hall (16,455); Champaign, IL
Mar 4, 1989		Northwestern	W 78–59	15–11 (7–9)	Williams Arena; Minneapolis, MN
Mar 8, 1989		Michigan State	W 77–61	16–11 (8–9)	Williams Arena; Minneapolis, MN
Mar 11, 1989		at Ohio State	W 78–70	17–11 (9–9)	St. John Arena; Columbus, OH
NCAA Tournament
Mar 16, 1989*; CBS	(11 E)	vs. (6 E) Kansas State; First Round	W 86–75	18–11	Greensboro Coliseum; Greensboro, NC
Mar 18, 1989*; CBS	(11 E)	vs. (13 E) Siena; Second Round	W 80–67	19–11	Greensboro Coliseum; Greensboro, NC
Mar 24, 1989*; CBS	(11 E)	vs. (2 E) No. 9 Duke; Sweet 16	L 70–87	19–12	Brendan Byrne Arena; East Rutherford, NJ
*Non-conference game. ^{#}Rankings from AP Poll. (#) Tournament seedings in parentheses.
