= Danny Jones (basketball) =

American basketball player (born 1968)

Personal information
- Born: October 24, 1968 (age 58) Aurora, Illinois, U.S.
- Listed height: 6 ft 6 in (1.98 m)
- Listed weight: 245 lb (111 kg)

Career information
- High school: Boylan Catholic (Rockford, Illinois)
- College: Wisconsin (1986–1990)
- NBA draft: 1990: undrafted
- Playing career: 1990–2000?
- Position: Forward
- Number: 50, 34

Career history
- 1990–1991: Rockford Lightning
- 1991–1993: La Crosse Catbirds
- 1994–1995: Pittsburgh Piranhas
- 1997–1998: La Crosse Bobcats
- –2001: Soles de Jalisco

Career highlights
- 2× CIMEBA champion (2000, 2001); CBA champion (1992); AP Honorable Mention All-American (1989); 2× Second-team All-Big Ten (1989, 1990)

Danny Jones (born October 24, 1968) is an American former professional basketball player.

== Career ==
He was a standout for the University of Wisconsin but was never drafted to the National Basketball Association (NBA). Instead, he played for the Rockford Lightning in the 1990–91 Continental Basketball Association season where he averaged 12.2 points and 4.3 rebounds in 24 games. The following season, he played for the La Crosse Catbirds that won the league championship.

From there, Jones proceeded to the World Basketball League where he suited up for Erie Wave and normed 20.6 points per game. Initially, out of college, he saw action for Efes Pilsen in Turkey, and then went to the Philippines to play for Ginebra San Miguel in the Philippine Basketball Association.

He won back-to-back Circuito Mexicano de Básquetbol (CIMEBA) titles with the Soles de Jalisco.
