= Lowell Hamilton =

American former basketball player (born 1966)

Personal information
- Born: May 3, 1966 (age 60) Chicago, Illinois
- Listed height: 6 ft 7 in (2.01 m)
- Listed weight: 185 lb (84 kg)

Career information
- High school: Providence St. Mel (Chicago, Illinois)
- College: Illinois (1985–1989)
- NBA draft: 1989: undrafted
- Position: Center

Career highlights
- First-team Parade All-American (1985); Second-team Parade All-American (1984); McDonald's All-American (1985)

Lowell Hamilton (born May 3, 1966) is an American former basketball player.

== High school ==
Hamilton was a dominant high school basketball player at Chicago's Providence St. Mel, where he led the Knights to four consecutive IHSA boys' sectional championships from 1982 to 1985, three consecutive "Elite-Eight" appearances from 1983 to 1985 as well as appearances in the "Final-Four" in 1984 and a state championship in 1985. In his four years of varsity basketball, Hamilton scored 165 points in 11 IHSA tournament finals games, averaging 15.0 points per game and was named to the all-tournament team at center in '83, '84 and '85. While playing for St. Mel, Hamilton's teams would lose only 14 times while winning 116 games for an 89.2 winning percentage. Each season at St. Mel, Hamilton's teams would advance further in the state tournament. During his freshman year, under the direction of head coach Tom Shields, Hamilton's team would finish the season with a loss in the IHSA super-sectional to future Fighting Illini basketball player Scott Meents and the Herscher Tigers. As a sophomore, Hamilton's team would win the super-sectional but lose in the quarterfinals to future Indiana Hoosiers guard, Marty "The Mule" Simmons and the defending state champion, Lawrenceville Indians. It would be Hamilton's junior year when the Knights would dominate Illinois high school basketball, finishing the regular season with 22 wins and only 3 losses. As the final day of the season started, Hamilton's team had increased their win total to 29, however, a hot-shooting Mt. Pulaski High School would hold off the Knights on their way to the championship game, leaving a third-place game versus Lena-Winslow High School where they would earn their 30th victory.

As a senior, Hamilton and the Knights entered the post-season tournament ranked #1 in the state of Illinois with a record of 22 and 3. Hamilton's team won their regional, sectional and super-sectional contests on their path to the "Final-Four" in the IHSA. In the semifinal game, Hamilton's team was pitted against Thad Matta and the Cornjerkers from Hoopeston for the chance to play for a state championship. St. Mel won this game and moved into the championship game against Chrisman High School. The Knights dominated the game, taking a 30 to 8 lead after the first quarter and cruising to a final score of 95 to 63. Hamilton scored 21 points in the game and 64 points in the tournament and the St. Mel Knights finished the year with a record of 31 and 3. In his four years of varsity basketball, Hamilton's teams would win 116 games while only losing 14, winning 89.2 percent of all games played.

After the season, Hamilton was named a McDonald's All-American and played in the 1985 game with teammates Quin Snyder, Sean Elliott and Roy Marble while opposing Danny Ferry and Pervis Ellison. Hamilton would score 13 points in a losing effort for the West team.

In 2007, the Illinois High School Association named Hamilton one of the 100 Legends of the IHSA Boys Basketball Tournament.

Hamilton went on to play for the University of Illinois for four years, 1985–1989. He was part of the Flyin' Illini team that qualified for the 1989 NCAA men's basketball tournament Final Four. Hamilton scored 1,241 career points with 87 blocked shots while having a .534 field goal percentage for the Fighting Illini.

== College career ==
=== 1985–86 season ===
As a freshman, Hamilton appeared in 24 of the Illini's 32 games. He totaled 88 points and hauled in 41 rebounds.

=== 1986–87 season ===
During Hamilton's sophomore season, his playing time jumped to nearly 24 minutes per game, including 22 starts out of the 31 games he played. He finished the season with the fourth highest point total (334) averaging 10.8 points per game. Hamilton was tied with the highest field goal average at .578 and the third most rebounds with 121. Teammate Ken Norman finished the season with 48 blocked shots with Hamilton taking second place on the team with 31.

=== 1987–88 season ===
The Fighting Illini experienced a surge in performance sparked by the play of sophomore guards Nick Anderson and Kendall Gill along with the addition of junior forward Kenny Battle. These additions, however, limited Hamilton's playing time and reduced his starts to 6 out of the 33 games he played in during the season. Even with a reduced role, Hamilton finished the season with the fifth highest point total averaging 10 points per game, and the third most blocked shots.

=== 1988–89 season ===
Hamilton was an instrumental force in the 1988–89 Illinois Fighting Illini men's basketball team's drive to the Final Four. He started 33 games during that season and played in all 36. Hamilton was third on the Fighting Illini in scoring with 488 points (13.6 per game), second on the team in rebounding with 204 (5.7 per game) and second on the team in blocked shots with 31. His quiet, assertive play under the basket sparked the Fighting Illini's running game while helping Illinois to a team average 86.4 points per game, its highest since 1966. Hamilton was co-captain along with Battle during the "Flyin Illini's" magical run.

== Honors ==
=== High school ===
- 1983 – IHSA All-Tournament Team
- 1984 – IHSA All-Tournament Team
- 1984 – Parade Magazine 2nd Team All-American
- 1985 – All-State 1st Team
- 1985 – IHSA All-Tournament Team
- 1985 – Parade Magazine 1st Team All-American
- 1985 – McDonald's All-American
- 1998 – Inducted into the Illinois Basketball Coaches Association's Hall of Fame as a player.
- 2007 – Named one of the 100 Legends of the IHSA Boys Basketball Tournament.

=== College ===
- 1987 – Honorable Mention All-Big Ten
- 1989 – Honorable Mention All-Big Ten
- 1989 – Team Captain

== College statistics ==
Season	Games	Points	PPG	Field Goals	Attempts	Avg	Free Throws	Attempts	Avg	Rebounds	Avg	Assists	APG	Blocks	BPG
1985–86	24	88	3.7	36	67	.537	16	26	.615	41	1.7	4	0.2	6	0.2
1986–87	31	334	10.8	149	258	.578	36	66	.545	121	3.9	28	0.9	31	1.0
1987–88	33	331	10.0	141	271	.520	48	77	.623	127	3.8	9	0.3	19	0.6
1988–89	36	488	13.6	219	424	.518	50	89	.562	204	5.7	24	0.7	31	0.9
Totals	124	1241	10.0	545	1020	.534	150	258	.581	493	4.0	65	0.5	87	0.7
