= 1989 NCAA Men's Basketball All-Americans =

- Awarded for: 1988–89 NCAA Division I men's basketball season

The Consensus 1989 College Basketball All-American team, as determined by aggregating the results of four major All-American teams. To earn "consensus" status, a player must win honors from a majority of the following teams: the Associated Press, the USBWA, The United Press International and the National Association of Basketball Coaches.

== 1989 Consensus All-America team ==
Consensus First Team
Player	Position	Class	Team
Sean Elliott	F	Senior	Arizona
Pervis Ellison	C	Senior	Louisville
Danny Ferry	F	Senior	Duke
Chris Jackson	G	Freshman	Louisiana State
Stacey King	C	Senior	Oklahoma

Consensus Second Team
Player	Position	Class	Team
Mookie Blaylock	G	Senior	Oklahoma
Sherman Douglas	G	Senior	Syracuse
Jay Edwards	G	Sophomore	Indiana
Todd Lichti	G	Senior	Stanford
Glen Rice	F	Senior	Michigan
Lionel Simmons	F	Junior	La Salle

== Individual All-America teams ==
All-America Team
All-America Team	First team		Second team		Third team	
All-America Team	Player	School	Player	School	Player	School
Associated Press	Sean Elliott	Arizona	Glen Rice	Michigan	George McCloud	Florida State
Associated Press	Danny Ferry	Duke	Jay Edwards	Indiana	Todd Lichti	Stanford
Associated Press	Sherman Douglas	Syracuse	Mookie Blaylock	Oklahoma	Hank Gathers	Loyola Marymount
Associated Press	Chris Jackson	LSU	Pervis Ellison	Louisville	Alonzo Mourning	Georgetown
Associated Press	Stacey King	Oklahoma	Charles Smith	Georgetown	Lionel Simmons	La Salle
USBWA	Sean Elliott	Arizona	Glen Rice	Michigan	No third team	
USBWA	Pervis Ellison	Louisville	Mookie Blaylock	Oklahoma	No third team	
USBWA	Danny Ferry	Duke	Todd Lichti	Stanford	No third team	
USBWA	Chris Jackson	LSU	Hank Gathers	Loyola Marymount	No third team	
USBWA	Stacey King	Oklahoma	Lionel Simmons	La Salle	No third team	
NABC	Sean Elliott	Arizona	Charles Smith	Georgetown	George McCloud	Florida State
NABC	Danny Ferry	Duke	Jay Edwards	Indiana	Derrick Coleman	Syracuse
NABC	Mookie Blaylock	Oklahoma	Todd Lichti	Stanford	Sherman Douglas	Syracuse
NABC	Pervis Ellison	Louisville	Chris Jackson	LSU	Tom Hammonds	Georgia Tech
NABC	Stacey King	Oklahoma	Lionel Simmons	La Salle	J. R. Reid	North Carolina
UPI	Sean Elliott	Arizona	Pervis Ellison	Louisville	George McCloud	Florida State
UPI	Jay Edwards	Indiana	Derrick Coleman	Syracuse	Mookie Blaylock	Oklahoma
UPI	Danny Ferry	Duke	Todd Lichti	Stanford	Glen Rice	Michigan
UPI	Stacey King	Oklahoma	Charles Smith	Georgetown	Hank Gathers	Loyola Marymount
UPI	Chris Jackson	LSU	Lionel Simmons	La Salle	Alonzo Mourning	Georgetown

AP Honorable Mention:

- Nick Anderson, Illinois
- B. J. Armstrong, Iowa
- Stacey Augmon, UNLV
- Dana Barros, Boston College
- Kenny Battle, Illinois
- Ricky Blanton, LSU
- Chucky Brown, NC State
- Jay Burson, Ohio State
- Derrick Coleman, Syracuse
- Bimbo Coles, Virginia Tech
- Anthony Cook, Arizona
- Kendall Gill, Illinois
- Gerald Glass, Ole Miss
- Scott Haffner, Evansville
- Tom Hammonds, Georgia Tech
- Tim Hardaway, UTEP
- Steve Henson, Kansas State
- Tyrone Hill, Xavier
- Joe Hillman, Indiana
- Ed Horton, Iowa
- Byron Irvin, Missouri
- Danny Jones, Wisconsin
- Jeff Lebo, North Carolina
- Kurk Lee, Towson State
- Don MacLean, UCLA
- Mark Macon, Temple
- Roy Marble, Iowa
- Jeff Martin, Murray State
- Eric McLaughlin, Akron
- Rodney Monroe, NC State
- John Morton, Seton Hall
- Dyron Nix, Tennessee
- Gary Payton, Oregon State
- Elliot Perry, Memphis State
- Ramón Ramos, Seton Hall
- J. R. Reid, North Carolina
- Rumeal Robinson, Michigan
- Kenny Sanders, George Mason
- Dwayne Schintzius, Florida
- Brian Shorter, Pittsburgh
- Michael Smith, BYU
- John Taft, Marshall
- Stephen Thompson, Syracuse
- Loy Vaught, Michigan
- Randy White, Louisiana Tech
