= Kenny Battle =

American basketball player (born 1964)

Personal information
- Born: October 10, 1964 (age 62) Aurora, Illinois, U.S.
- Listed height: 6 ft 6 in (1.98 m)
- Listed weight: 210 lb (95 kg)

Career information
- High school: West Aurora (Aurora, Illinois)
- College: Northern Illinois (1984–1986); Illinois (1987–1989)
- NBA draft: 1989: 1st round, 27th overall pick
- Drafted by: Detroit Pistons
- Playing career: 1989–2000
- Position: Small forward
- Number: 3, 5, 8, 33

Career history
- 1989–1991: Phoenix Suns
- 1991: Denver Nuggets
- 1991–1992: La Crosse Catbirds
- 1992: Boston Celtics
- 1992: Golden State Warriors
- 1992: La Crosse Catbirds
- 1992: Boston Celtics
- 1992–1994: La Crosse Catbirds
- 1994–1995: Quad City Thunder
- 1995: Olimpia de Venado Tuerto
- 2000: Fargo-Moorhead Beez

Career highlights
- CBA champion (1992); First-team All-MAC (1986)
- Stats at NBA.com
- Stats at Basketball Reference

Kenneth R. Battle (born October 10, 1964) is an American former professional basketball player.

== High school career ==
In 1984, Battle led Aurora West High School to third place in the Illinois High School Association Class AA state basketball tournament. Battle led the tournament with 86 points in four games for third-place finisher Aurora West.

In 2007, the Illinois High School Association named Battle one of the 100 Legends of the IHSA Boys Basketball Tournament.

== College career ==
Battle played collegiately at Northern Illinois University from 1984 to 1986 before transferring to the University of Illinois. He was known as "King of the 360s" while playing at Northern Illinois. He was the captain of the 1989 Illinois team nicknamed the Flyin' Illini. The team reached the Final Four before being topped by Michigan. Battle was a fan favorite due to his hustle and spectacular slam dunks. The Illini awards the Kenny Battle Inspirational Award to the player who shows the most hustle during the season.

== Professional career ==
Battle was selected by the Detroit Pistons in the 1st round (27th overall) of the 1989 NBA draft and then traded on draft day to the Phoenix Suns along with Micheal Williams in exchange for the Suns' first round draft choice (24th overall pick), Anthony Cook. Battle played in 4 NBA seasons for the Phoenix Suns, Denver Nuggets, Boston Celtics and Golden State Warriors. His best year as a pro came during the 1991-92 NBA season when he split time with the Suns and Nuggets, appearing in 56 games and averaging 6.1 ppg. However, Battle's best game as a pro came on November 10, 1990, when he scored 23 points on 8/14 shooting in a Suns 173 – 143 victory over the Nuggets. Prior to that, he competed in the 1990 NBA Slam Dunk Contest, where he finished in last place (8th).

Battle won a Continental Basketball Association (CBA) championship with the La Crosse Catbirds in 1992.

Battle briefly joined the Fargo-Moorhead Beez of the International Basketball Association in 2000. Currently Kenny is the director of basketball at Camp Judaea in Hendersonville, North Carolina.

== Honors ==
=== Basketball ===
- 1985–96 – NABC National Dunker of the Year
- 1985 – 2nd Team All-Mid-American Conference
- 1985 – Mid-American Conference Freshman of the Year
- 1985 – Honorable Mention All American
- 1986 – Youngest player in MAC History to Reach 1,000 Career Points.
- 1986 – 1st Team All-Mid-American Conference
- 1986 – Honorable Mention All American
- 1987 – Illini Co-MVP
- 1988 – 3rd Team All-Big Ten
- 1988 – Honorable Mention All American
- 1989 – Team Co-Captain
- 1989 – Preseason Wooden Award Nominee
- 1989 – 2nd Team All-Big Ten
- 1989 – Honorable Mention All American
- 1989 – NCAA All-Regional Team
- 1989 – Kenny Battle Leadership Award
- 1996 – Inducted into the Illinois Basketball Coaches Association's Hall of Fame as a player.
- 2000 – Named to the Northern Illinois University All-Century Team.
- 2004 – Elected to the "Illini Men's Basketball All-Century Team".
- 2008 – Honored jersey which hangs in the State Farm Center to show regard for being the most decorated basketball players in the University of Illinois' history.

== Career statistics ==
Legend
GP	Games played	GS	Games started	MPG	Minutes per game
FG%	Field goal percentage	3P%	3-point field goal percentage	FT%	Free throw percentage
RPG	Rebounds per game	APG	Assists per game	SPG	Steals per game
BPG	Blocks per game	PPG	Points per game	**Bold**	Career high

=== College ===
==== Northern Illinois University ====
Season	Games	Points	PPG	Field Goals	Attempts	Avg	Free Throws	Attempts	Avg	Rebounds	RPG	Assists	APG	Steals	SPG
1984–85	27	544	20.1	195	369	.528	154	234	.658	167	6.2	59	2.2	60	2.2
1985–86	27	528	19.6	201	354	.568	126	193	.653	175	6.5	59	2.2	67*	2.5
**Totals**	**54**	**1,072**	**19.9**	**396**	**723**	**.548**	**280**	**427**	**.656**	**342**	**6.3**	**118**	**2.2**	**127**	**2.4**

* All-time Single Season Record in Northern Illinois University history

==== University of Illinois ====
Season	Games	Points	PPG	Field Goals	Attempts	Avg	Free Throws	Attempts	Avg	Rebounds	Avg	Assists	APG	Steals	SPG
1987–88	33	516	15.6	197	341	.578	122	179	.682	183	5.5	55	1.7	72	2.2
1988–89	36	596	16.6	218	361	.604	151	200	.755	174	4.8	64	1.8	89*	2.5
**Totals**	**69**	**1,112**	**16.1**	**415**	**702**	**.591**	**273**	**379**	**.720**	**357**	**5.2**	**119**	**1.7**	**161**	**2.3**

* All-time Single Season Record in University of Illinois history

==== Combined college statistics ====
Season	Games	Points	PPG	Field Goals	Attempts	Avg	Free Throws	Attempts	Avg	Rebounds	Avg	Assists	APG	Steals	SPG
**1984–89**	**123**	**2,184**	**17.8**	**811**	**1,425**	**.569**	**553**	**806**	**.686**	**699**	**5.7**	**237**	**1.9**	**288**	**2.3**

=== NBA ===
Source

=== Regular season ===
Year	Team	GP	GS	MPG	FG%	3P%	FT%	RPG	APG	SPG	BPG	PPG
1989–90	Phoenix	**59**	**8**	12.4	.547	**.250**	.671	2.1	.6	.6	.2	4.1
1990–91	Phoenix	16	4	16.4	.442	.000	.690	3.3	.9	**1.2**	**.4**	6.0
1990–91	Denver	40	4	**17.1**	.485	.136	.781	3.1	**1.2**	1.0	.3	**6.1**
1991–92	Boston	8	0	5.8	**.750**	–	**1.000**	1.1	.0	.1	.0	1.8
1991–92	Golden State	8	0	5.8	.615	.000	.500	.9	.5	.1	.3	2.3
1992–93	Boston	3	1	9.7	.462	.000	**1.000**	**3.7**	.7	.3	.0	4.7
Career		134	17	13.4	.504	.133	.725	2.4	.8	.7	.2	4.7

=== Playoffs ===
Year	Team	GP	GS	MPG	FG%	3P%	FT%	RPG	APG	SPG	BPG	PPG
1990	Phoenix	8	0	4.3	.308	–	1.000	.6	.0	.0	.0	1.1
