= 1988–89 Big East Conference men's basketball season =

American college basketball season

1988–89 Big East Conference Men's Basketball Season
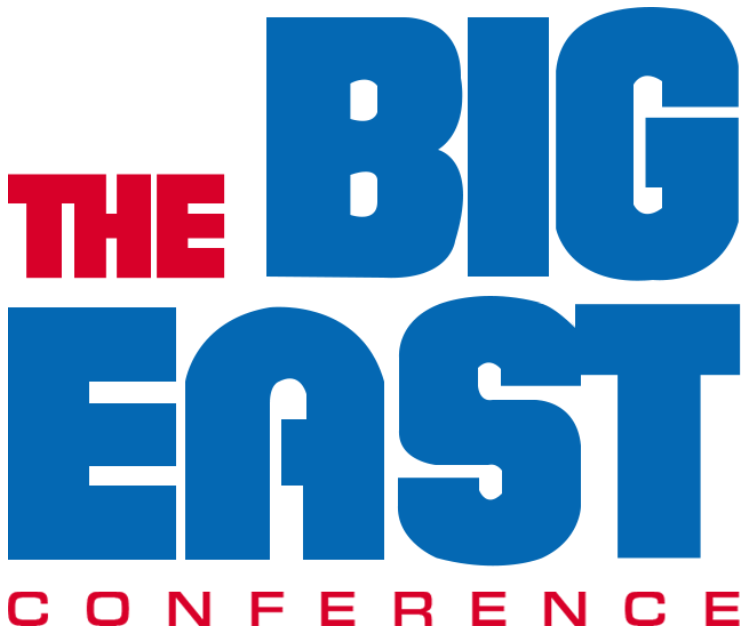
- League: NCAA Division I
- Sport: Basketball
- Duration: November 18, 1988 through March 12, 1989
- Teams: 9
- TV partner: ESPN

Regular Season
- Champion: Georgetown (13–3)
- Season MVP: Charles Smith – Georgetown

Tournament
- Champions: Georgetown
- Finals MVP: Charles Smith – Georgetown

Basketball seasons
- 1987–88 1989–90

1988–89 Big East men's basketball standings
| | Conf. | | | | Overall |
| Team | W | | L | PCT | W | | L | PCT |
|---|---|---|---|---|---|---|---|---|
| No. 2 Georgetown † | 13 | – | 3 | .813 | 29 | – | 5 | .853 |
| No. 11 Seton Hall | 11 | – | 5 | .688 | 31 | – | 7 | .816 |
| No. 7 Syracuse | 10 | – | 6 | .625 | 30 | – | 8 | .789 |
| Pittsburgh | 9 | – | 7 | .563 | 17 | – | 13 | .567 |
| Villanova | 7 | – | 9 | .438 | 18 | – | 16 | .529 |
| Providence | 7 | – | 9 | .438 | 18 | – | 11 | .621 |
| Connecticut | 6 | – | 10 | .375 | 18 | – | 13 | .581 |
| St. John's | 6 | – | 10 | .375 | 20 | – | 13 | .606 |
| Boston College | 3 | – | 13 | .188 | 12 | – | 17 | .414 |
† 1989 Big East tournament winner As of April 3, 1989; Rankings from AP poll

The 1988–89 Big East Conference men's basketball season was the 10th in conference history, and involved its nine full-time member schools.

Georgetown was the regular-season champion with a record of (13–3). Georgetown also won the Big East tournament championship.

In the 1989 NCAA tournament, Seton Hall reached the national championship game before losing to Michigan, finishing as the national runner-up.

St. John's won the 1989 National Invitation Tournament championship.

== Season summary & highlights ==
- Georgetown was the regular-season champion with a record of 13–3. It was Georgetown's fourth regular-season championship or co-championship and second outright championship.
- Georgetown won its sixth Big East tournament championship.
- The 66,144 people who attended the game Georgetown played against LSU at the Louisiana Superdome in New Orleans, Louisiana, on January 28, 1989, set the record for the largest crowd ever to attend a game involving Georgetown.
- Seton Hall reached the national championship game in the 1989 NCAA tournament before losing to Michigan, finishing as the national runner-up.
- St. John's won the 1989 National Invitation Tournament championship. It was the second consecutive NIT championship for a Big East school: Connecticut had won the 1988 NIT the previous season.
- St. John's junior forward Jayson Williams was named Most Valuable Player of the 1989 NIT.
- The Big East replaced its Freshman of the Year award with a new Rookie of the Year award. Both freshmen and first-year transfers into the Big East were eligible for the new award. Similarly, the conference began to name an annual All-Rookie Team, with the same eligibility criteria, rather than an annual All-Freshman Team. The conference did not retire the Rookie of the Year award and return to giving out a Freshman of the Year award until the 2015–16 season.

== Head coaches ==
| School | Coach | Season | Notes |
|---|---|---|---|
| Boston College | Jim O'Brien | 3rd | |
| Connecticut | Jim Calhoun | 3rd | |
| Georgetown | John Thompson Jr. | 17th | |
| Pittsburgh | Paul Evans | 3rd | |
| Providence | Rick Barnes | 1st | |
| St. John's | Lou Carnesecca | 19th | |
| Seton Hall | P. J. Carlesimo | 7th | Big East Coach of the Year (2nd award) |
| Syracuse | Jim Boeheim | 13th | |
| Villanova | Rollie Massimino | 14th | |

== Rankings ==
Georgetown was ranked No. 7 or higher in the Associated Press poll all season and spent most of the season at No. 5 or higher, reaching No. 2 in several weeks. Syracuse also was ranked for the entire season, was a Top Ten team for most of the year, and also reached No. 2. Seton Hall also spent much of the season in the Top 20, and Connecticut, Providence, and Villanova also made Top 20 appearances.

1988–89 Big East Conference Weekly Rankings Key: ██ Increase in ranking. ██ Decrease in ranking.
| AP Poll | Pre | 11/21 | 11/28 | 12/5 | 12/12 | 12/19 | 12/26 | 1/2 | 1/9 | 1/16 | 1/23 | 1/30 | 2/6 | 2/13 | 2/20 | 2/27 | 3/6 | Final |
|---|---|---|---|---|---|---|---|---|---|---|---|---|---|---|---|---|---|---|
| Boston College | | | | | | | | | | | | | | | | | | |
| Connecticut | | | | 18 | | | | | | | | | | | | | | |
| Georgetown | 2 | 2 | 3 | 4 | 5 | 6 | 5 | 5 | 7 | 3 | 2 | 6 | 2 | 4 | 3 | 2 | 3 | 2 |
| Pittsburgh | | | | | | | | | | | | | | | | | | |
| Providence | | | | | | | | | 20 | | 20 | | | | | | | |
| St. John's | | | | | | | | | | | | | | | | | | |
| Seton Hall | | | | 20 | 17 | 15 | 13 | 10 | 13 | 12 | 9 | 10 | 11 | 12 | 15 | 12 | 11 | 11 |
| Syracuse | 8 | 6 | 4 | 3 | 3 | 3 | 3 | 2 | 4 | 11 | 14 | 14 | 9 | 6 | 6 | 6 | 5 | 7 |
| Villanova | 12 | 11 | 18 | 17 | | | | | | | | | | | | | | |

== Regular-season statistical leaders ==
Scoring
| Name | School | PPG |
| Dana Barros | BC | 23.9 |
| Cliff Robinson | Conn | 20.0 |
| Brian Shorter | Pitt | 19.6 |
| Jayson Williams | SJU | 19.5 |
| Charles Smith | GU | 18.7 |

Rebounding
| Name | School | RPG |
| Derrick Coleman | Syr | 11.4 |
| Brian Shorter | Pitt | 9.6 |
| Jayson Williams | SJU | 7.9 |
| Bobby Martin | Pitt | 7.7 |
| Ramón Ramos | SHU | 7.6 |

Assists
| Name | School | APG |
| Sherman Douglas | Syr | 8.6 |
| Sean Miller | Pitt | 6.0 |
| Gerald Greene | SHU | 5.1 |
| Charles Smith | GU | 5.1 |
| Tate George | Conn | 4.9 |

Steals
| Name | School | SPG |
| Eric Murdock | Prov | 3.3 |
| Stephen Thompson | Syr | 1.9 |
| Gary Massey | Vill | 1.8 |
| Sherman Douglas | Syr | 1.8 |
| Cliff Robinson | Conn | 1.8 |

Blocks
| Name | School | BPG |
| Alonzo Mourning | GU | 5.0 |
| Derrick Coleman | Syr | 3.4 |
| Dikembe Mutombo | GU | 2.3 |
| Tom Greis | Vill | 1.7 |
| Cliff Robinson | Conn | 1.4 |

Field Goals
| Name | School | FG% |
| Stephen Thompson | Syr | .639 |
| Brian Shorter | Pitt | .600 |
| Derrick Coleman | Syr | .575 |
| Jayson Williams | SJU | .573 |
| Sherman Douglas | Syr | .546 |

3-Pt Field Goals
| Name | School | 3FG% |
| Dana Barros | BC | .429 |
(no other qualifiers)

Free Throws
| Name | School | FT% |
| Jason Matthews | Pitt | .899 |
| Dana Barros | BC | .857 |
| Matt Brust | SJU | .831 |
| John Morton | SHU | .820 |
| Billy Singleton | SJU | .802 |

== Postseason ==
=== Big East tournament ===
==== Seeding ====
Seeding in the Big East tournament was based on conference record, with tiebreakers applied as necessary. The eighth- and ninth-seeded teams played a first-round game, and the other seven teams received a bye into the quarterfinals.

The tournament's seeding was as follows: (1) Georgetown, (2) Seton Hall, (3) Syracuse, (4) Pittsburgh, (5) Villanova, (6) Providence, (7) Connecticut, (8) St. John's, (9) Boston College.

==== Bracket ====
First round March 9, 1989
8 | St. John's | 74
9 | Boston College | 81

Quarterfinals; March 10, 1989
1 | #3 Georgetown | 82
9 | Boston College | 52
4 | Pittsburgh | 71
5 | Villanova | 66
3 | #5 Syracuse | 79
6 | Providence | 76
2 | #11 Seton Hall | 74
7 | Connecticut | 66

Semifinals; March 11, 1989
1 | #3 Georgetown | 85
4 | Pittsburgh | 62
3 | #5 Syracuse | 81
2 | #11 Seton Hall | 78

Championship Game; March 12, 1989
1 | #3 Georgetown | 88
3 | #5 Syracuse | 79

=== NCAA tournament ===
Five Big East teams received bids to the NCAA Tournament, with Georgetown receiving a No. 1 seed in the East Region. Pittsburgh and Providence lost in the first round and Georgetown and Syracuse lost in the regional finals. Seton Hall finished as the national runner-up, losing to Michigan in the national championship game.

| School | Region | Seed | Round 1 | Round 2 | Sweet 16 | Elite 8 | Final 4 | Final |
|---|---|---|---|---|---|---|---|---|
| Seton Hall | West | 3 | 14 Southwest Missouri State, W 60–51 | 11 Evansville, W 87–73 | 2 Indiana, W 78–65 | 4 UNLV, W 84–61 | E2 Duke, W 95–78 | SE3 Michigan, L 80–79^{(OT)} |
| Georgetown | East | 1 | 16 Princeton, W 50–49 | 9 Notre Dame, W 81–74 | 5 NC State, W 69–61 | 2 Duke, L 85–77 | | |
| Syracuse | Midwest | 2 | 15 Bucknell, W 104–81 | 10 Colorado State, W 65–50 | 3 Missouri, W 83–80 | 1 Illinois, L 89–86 | | |
| Pittsburgh | Midwest | 8 | 9 Ball State, L 68–64 | | | | | |
| Providence | Southeast | 12 | 5 Virginia, L 100–97 | | | | | |

=== National Invitation Tournament ===
Three Big East teams received bids to the National Invitation Tournament, which did not yet have seeding. Playing in three different unnamed brackets, Connecticut and Villanova both lost in the quarterfinals, but St. John's defeated Saint Louis for the 1989 NIT championship. It was the second consecutive NIT championship for a Big East school. St. John's junior forward Jayson Williams was the tournament's Most Valuable Player.

| School | Round 1 | Round 2 | Quarterfinals | Semifinals | Final |
|---|---|---|---|---|---|
| St. John's | Ole Miss, W 70–67 | Oklahoma State, W 76–64 | Ohio State, W 83–80 | UAB, W 76–65 | Saint Louis, W 73–65 |
| Connecticut | Charlotte, W 67–62 | California, W 73–72 | UAB, L 85–79 | | |
| Villanova | Saint Peter's, W 76–56 | Penn State, W 76–67 | Michigan State, L 70–63 | | |

== Awards and honors ==
=== Big East Conference ===
Player of the Year:

- * Charles Smith, Georgetown, G Sr.

Defensive Player of the Year:

- Alonzo Mourning, Georgetown, C, Fr.

Rookie of the Year:

- Brian Shorter, Pittsburgh, F, So.

Coach of the Year:

- P. J. Carlesimo, Seton Hall (7th season)

All-Big East First Team

- Charles Smith, Georgetown, G Sr., 6 ft 1 in (185 cm), 160 lb (73 kg), Washington, D.C.
- Brian Shorter, Pittsburgh, F, So., 6 ft 6 in (198 cm), 242 lb (110 kg), Philadelphia, Pa.
- Ramón Ramos, Seton Hall, F Sr., 6 ft 6 in (198 cm), 242 lb (110 kg), Canóvanas, P.R.
- Derrick Coleman, Syracuse, F Jr., 6 ft 10 in (208 cm), 258 lb (117 kg), Mobile, Ala.
- Sherman Douglas, Syracuse, G Sr., 6 ft 0 in (183 cm), 180 lb (82 kg), Washington, D.C.

All-Big East Second Team:

- Dana Barros, Boston College, G Sr., 5 ft 11 in (180 cm), 163 lb (74 kg), Boston, Mass.
- Cliff Robinson, Connecticut, C Sr., 6 ft 10 in (208 cm), 245 lb (111 kg), Portland, Ore.
- Alonzo Mourning, Georgetown, C, Fr. 6 ft 10 in (208 cm), 261 lb (118 kg), Chesapeake, Va.
- Jayson Williams, St. John's, F Jr., 6 ft 9 in (206 cm), 240 lb (109 kg), Ritter, S.C.
- Stephen Thompson, Syracuse, G Jr., 6 ft 4 in (193 cm), 185 lb (84 kg), Los Angeles, Calif.

All-Big East Third Team:

- Jason Matthews, Pittsburgh, G, So., 6 ft 3 in (191 cm)
- Eric Murdock, Providence, G, So., 6 ft 1 in (185 cm), 190 lb (86 kg), Somerville, N.J.
- Andrew Gaze, Seton Hall, G Jr., 6 ft 7 in (201 cm), 209 lb (95 kg), Melbourne, Australia
- John Morton, Seton Hall, G Sr., 6 ft 3 in (191 cm), 180 lb (82 kg), The Bronx, N.Y.
- Doug West, Villanova, G Sr. 6 ft 6 in (198 cm), 200 lb (91 kg), Altoona, Pa.

Big East All-Rookie Team:

- Alonzo Mourning, Georgetown, C, Fr., 6 ft 10 in (208 cm), 261 lb (118 kg), Chesapeake, Va.
- Brian Shorter, Pittsburgh, F, So., 6 ft 6 in (198 cm), 242 lb (110 kg), Philadelphia, Pa.
- Malik Sealy, St. John's, F, Fr., 6 ft 8 in (203 cm), 200 lb (91 kg), The Bronx, N.Y.
- Billy Owens, Syracuse, F, Fr., 6 ft 8 in (203 cm), 220 lb (100 kg), Carlisle, Pa.
- Marc Dowdell, Villanova, F, Fr., 6 ft 9 in (206 cm)

=== All-Americans ===
The following players were selected to the 1989 Associated Press All-America teams.

Consensus All-America Second Team:

- Sherman Douglas, Syracuse, Key Stats: 18.2 ppg, 2.4 rpg, 8.6 apg, 54.6 FG%, 36.8 3P%, 693 points

First Team All-America:

- Sherman Douglas, Syracuse, Key Stats: 18.2 ppg, 2.4 rpg, 8.6 apg, 54.6 FG%, 36.8 3P%, 693 points

Second Team All-America:

- Charles Smith, Georgetown, Key Stats: 18.7 ppg, 3.6 rpg, 5.1 apg, 1.8 spg, 49.8 FG%, 40.4 3P%, 617 points

Third Team All-America:

- Alonzo Mourning, Georgetown, Key Stats: 13.1 ppg, 7.3 rpg, 5.0 bpg, 60.3 FG%, 447 points

AP Honorable Mention

- Dana Barros, Boston College
- Derrick Coleman, Syracuse
- John Morton, Seton Hall
- Ramón Ramos, Seton Hall
- Brian Shorter, Pittsburgh
- Stephen Thompson, Syracuse

== See also ==
- 1988–89 NCAA Division I men's basketball season
- 1988–89 Connecticut Huskies men's basketball team
- 1988–89 Georgetown Hoyas men's basketball team
- 1988–89 Pittsburgh Panthers men's basketball team
- 1988–89 Providence Friars men's basketball team
- 1988–89 St. John's Redmen basketball team
- 1988–89 Seton Hall Pirates men's basketball team
- 1988–89 Syracuse Orangemen basketball team
