= Seton Hall Pirates men's basketball statistical leaders =

The Seton Hall Pirates men's basketball statistical leaders are individual statistical leaders of the Seton Hall Pirates men's basketball program in various categories, including points, three-pointers, assists, blocks, rebounds, and steals. Within those areas, the lists identify single-game, single-season, and career leaders. The Pirates represent Seton Hall University in the NCAA's Big East Conference.

Seton Hall began competing in intercollegiate basketball in 1903. However, the school's record book does not generally list records from before the 1950s, as records from before this period are often incomplete and inconsistent. Since scoring was much lower in this era, and teams played much fewer games during a typical season, it is likely that few or no players from this era would appear on these lists anyway.

The NCAA did not officially record assists as a stat until the 1983–84 season, and blocks and steals until the 1985–86 season, but Seton Hall record books includes players in these stats before these seasons. These lists are updated through the end of the 2020–21 season.

== Scoring ==
Career
Rk	Player	Points	Seasons
1	Terry Dehere	2494	1989–90 1990–91 1991–92 1992–93
2	Nick Werkman	2273	1961–62 1962–63 1963–64
3	Myles Powell	2252	2016–17 2017–18 2018–19 2019–20
4	Jeremy Hazell	2146	2007–08 2008–09 2009–10 2010–11
5	Greg Tynes	2059	1974–75 1975–76 1976–77 1977–78
6	Dan Callandrillo	1985	1978–79 1979–80 1980–81 1981–82
7	Andre McCloud	1976	1982–83 1983–84 1984–85 1985–86
8	Mark Bryant	1906	1984–85 1985–86 1986–87 1987–88
9	Andre Barrett	1861	2000–01 2001–02 2002–03 2003–04
10	Khadeen Carrington	1846	2014–15 2015–16 2016–17 2017–18

Season
Rk	Player	Points	Season
1	Walter Dukes	861	1952–53
2	Nick Werkman	830	1963–64
3	Nick Werkman	793	1961–62
4	Myles Powell	784	2018–19
5	Terry Dehere	770	1992–93
6	Nick Galis	743	1978–79
7	Jeremy Hazell	726	2008–09
8	Mark Bryant	698	1987–88
	Dan Callandrillo	698	1981–82
10	Terry Dehere	672	1990–91

Single game
Rk	Player	Points	Season	Opponent
1	Nick Werkman	52	1963–64	Scranton
2	Nick Werkman	49	1961–62	St. Peter’s
3	Nick Galis	48	1978–79	Santa Clara
4	Dawan Scott	47	1977–78	Cal-Bakersfield
	Les Fries	47	1921–22	Brown
6	Nick Werkman	42	1962–63	St. Francis (PA)
	Nick Galis	42	1978–79	Fairleigh Dickinson
8	Khadeen Carrington	41	2016–17	Creighton
	Jeremy Hazell	41	2009–10	West Virginia
	Terry Dehere	41	1992–93	St. John’s
	Marco Lokar	41	1989–90	Pittsburgh

== Rebounds ==
NCAA Division I record

Career
Rk	Player	Rebounds	Seasons
1	Walter Dukes	1697	1950–51 1951–52 1952–53
2	Angel Delgado	1455	2014–15 2015–16 2016–17 2017–18
3	Glenn Mosley	1263	1973–74 1974–75 1975–76 1976–77
4	Ken House	1149	1969–70 1970–71 1971–72
5	Nick Werkman	1036	1961–62 1962–63 1963–64
6	Herb Pope	922	2009–10 2010–11 2011–12
7	Mark Bryant	912	1984–85 1985–86 1986–87 1987–88
8	Richie Dec	830	1962–63 1963–64 1964–65
9	Adrian Griffin	803	1992–93 1993–94 1994–95 1995–96
10	Kelly Whitney	763	2002–03 2003–04 2004–05 2005–06

Season
Rk	Player	Rebounds	Season
1	Walter Dukes	734	1952–53
2	Walter Dukes	513	1951–52
3	Glenn Mosley	473	1976–77
4	Walter Dukes	450	1950–51
5	Angel Delgado	431	2016–17
6	Nick Werkman	413	1961–62
7	Angel Delgado	402	2017–18
8	Ken House	394	1969–70
9	Ken House	385	1971–72
10	Ken House	370	1970–71

Single game
Rk	Player	Rebounds	Season	Opponent
1	Walter Dukes	34	1952–53	King’s
2	Nick Werkman	32	1962–63	Boston College
3	Walter Dukes	31	1951–52	Loyola (MD)
4	Nick Werkman	30	1962–63	St. Francis (PA)
5	Glenn Mosley	28	1976–77	Merrimack
6	Glenn Mosley	25	1976–77	St. Peter’s
7	Angel Delgado	23	2017–18	Kansas
8	Angel Delgado	22	2016–17	Butler
	Arnie Ring	22	1952–53	St. John’s
	Stephon Payne	22	2025–26	Marquette

== Assists ==
Career
Rk	Player	Assists	Seasons
1	Shaheen Holloway	681	1996–97 1997–98 1998–99 1999–00
2	Andre Barrett	662	2000–01 2001–02 2002–03 2003–04
3	Eugene Harvey	576	2006–07 2007–08 2008–09 2009–10
4	Jordan Theodore	541	2008–09 2009–10 2010–11 2011–12
5	Gerald Greene	528	1985–86 1986–87 1987–88 1988–89
6	John Morton	452	1985–86 1986–87 1987–88 1988–89
7	Richie Regan	443	1950–51 1951–52 1952–53
8	Golden Sunkett	439	1961–62 1962–63 1963–64
9	Dan Hurley	437	1991–92 1992–93 1993–94 1994–95 1995–96
10	Kadary Richmond	422	2021–22 2022–23 2023–24

Season
Rk	Player	Assists	Season
1	Jordan Theodore	226	2011–12
2	Golden Sunkett	197	1962–63
3	Paul Lape	195	1973–74
	Gerald Greene	195	1988–89
5	Shaheen Holloway	188	1997–98
6	Roger Kindel	186	1971–72
7	Mike Jones	185	1983–84
8	Andre Barrett	183	2003–04
9	Kadary Richmond	180	2023–24
10	Shaheen Holloway	177	1996–97

Single game
Rk	Player	Assists	Season	Opponent
1	Paul Lape	17	1972–73	Saint Peter’s
2	Gerald Greene	15	1985–86	Manhattan
	Dan Callandrillo	15	1978–79	Wagner
4	Mike Jones	14	1983–84	Monmouth
	Shaheen Holloway	14	1997–98	Syracuse
	Shaheen Holloway	14	1999–00	West Virginia
	Eugene Harvey	14	2009–10	Hartford
8	Dan Hurley	13	1994–95	USC
	Andre Barrett	13	2000–01	Saint Peter’s
	Andre Barrett	13	2001–02	Fairleigh Dickinson
	Jordan Theodore	13	2011–12	Providence
	Quincy McKnight	13	2019–20	Butler
	Kadary Richmond	13	2023–24	Xavier

== Steals ==
Career
Rk	Player	Steals	Seasons
1	Fuquan Edwin	295	2010–11 2011–12 2012–13 2013–14
2	Dan Callandrillo	260	1978–79 1979–80 1980–81 1981–82
3	Paul Gause	256	2005–06 2006–07 2007–08 2008–09
4	Shaheen Holloway	231	1996–97 1997–98 1998–99 1999–00
5	John Morton	207	1985–86 1986–87 1987–88 1988–89
	Adrian Griffin	207	1992–93 1993–94 1994–95 1995–96
7	Eugene Harvey	203	2006–07 2007–08 2008–09 2009–10
8	Levell Sanders	202	1994–95 1995–96 1996–97 1997–98
9	Jeremy Hazell	191	2007–08 2008–09 2009–10 2010–11
10	Kadary Richmond	183	2021–22 2022–23 2023–24

Season
Rk	Player	Steals	Season
1	Fuquan Edwin	102	2011–12
2	Paul Gause	90	2006–07
3	Paul Gause	85	2008–09
4	Dan Callandrillo	81	1979–80
5	Glenn Mosley	80	1976–77
6	Fuquan Edwin	79	2012–13
7	Fuquan Edwin	77	2013–14
	Shaheen Holloway	77	1996–97
	Kadary Richmond	77	2023–24
10	John Morton	75	1987–88

Single game
Rk	Player	Steals	Season	Opponent
1	Kadary Richmond	8	2023–24	UConn
	Fuquan Edwin	8	2013–14	Eastern Washington
	Fuquan Edwin	8	2011–12	Mercer
	Paul Gause	8	2006–07	Saint Mary’s
	Paul Gause	8	2007–08	Monmouth
	Paul Gause	8	2007–08	James Madison
	Levell Sanders	8	1996–97	Notre Dame
8	Eugene Harvey	7	2009–10	LIU-Brooklyn
	Fuquan Edwin	7	2011–12	Rutgers

== Blocks ==
Career
Rk	Player	Blocks	Seasons
1	Ike Obiagu	206	2019–20 2020–21 2021–22
2	Samuel Dalembert	167	1999–00 2000–01
3	Howard McNeil	156	1978–79 1979–80 1980–81 1981–82
4	Herb Pope	153	2009–10 2010–11 2011–12
5	John Garcia	149	2005–06 2006–07 2007–08 2008–09 2009–10
6	Ramon Ramos	146	1985–86 1986–87 1987–88 1988–89
7	Eddie Griffin	133	2000–01
8	Romaro Gill	129	2018–19 2019–20
9	Glenn Mosley	125	1973–74 1974–75 1975–76 1976–77
10	Anthony Avent	121	1988–89 1989–90 1990–91
	Artūras Karnišovas	121	1990–91 1991–92 1992–93 1993–94

Season
Rk	Player	Blocks	Season
1	Eddie Griffin	133	2000–01
2	Glenn Mosley	125	1976–77
3	Samuel Dalembert	107	1999–00
4	Romaro Gill	95	2019–20
5	Ike Obiagu	93	2021–22
6	Dawan Scott	88	1977–78
7	Ike Obiagu	77	2020–21
8	Luther Wright	76	1992–93
9	Najai Hines	69	2025–26
10	KC Ndefo	62	2022–23

Single game
Rk	Player	Blocks	Season	Opponent
1	Samuel Dalembert	11	1999–00	St. John’s
2	Eddie Griffin	10	2000–01	Norfolk State
3	Glenn Mosley	9	1974–75	St. John’s
	Samuel Dalembert	9	1999–00	Georgetown
	Ike Obiagu	9	2020–21	Georgetown
