= 1989 Big East men's basketball tournament =

- Classification: Division I
- Season: 1988–89
- Teams: 9
- Site: Madison Square Garden; New York City
- Champions: Georgetown (6th title)
- Winning coach: John Thompson (6th title)
- MVP: Charles Smith (Georgetown)
- Television: Big East Network, CBS (semifinals and championship game)

1988–89 Big East men's basketball standings
	Conf.				Overall
Team	W		L	PCT	W		L	PCT
No. 2 Georgetown †	13	–	3	.813	29	–	5	.853
No. 11 Seton Hall	11	–	5	.688	31	–	7	.816
No. 7 Syracuse	10	–	6	.625	30	–	8	.789
Pittsburgh	9	–	7	.563	17	–	13	.567
Villanova	7	–	9	.438	18	–	16	.529
Providence	7	–	9	.438	18	–	11	.621
Connecticut	6	–	10	.375	18	–	13	.581
St. John's	6	–	10	.375	20	–	13	.606
Boston College	3	–	13	.188	12	–	17	.414
† 1989 Big East tournament winner As of April 3, 1989; Rankings from AP poll

The 1989 Big East men's basketball tournament took place at Madison Square Garden in New York City, from March 9 to March 12, 1989. Its winner received the Big East Conference's automatic bid to the 1989 NCAA tournament. It is a single-elimination tournament with four rounds. Georgetown had the best regular season conference record and received the #1 seed.

Georgetown defeated Syracuse in the championship game 88–79, to claim its sixth Big East tournament championship.

== Bracket ==
First round March 9, 1989
8	St. John's	74
9	Boston College	81

Quarterfinals; March 10, 1989
1	#3 Georgetown	82
9	Boston College	52
4	Pittsburgh	71
5	Villanova	66
3	#5 Syracuse	79
6	Providence	76
2	#11 Seton Hall	74
7	Connecticut	66

Semifinals; March 11, 1989
1	#3 Georgetown	85
4	Pittsburgh	62
3	#5 Syracuse	81
2	#11 Seton Hall	78

Championship Game; March 12, 1989
1	#3 Georgetown	88
3	#5 Syracuse	79

=== Quarterfinals summary ===
Big East TV Network

Friday, March 10
12:00 PM EST

#2 Seton Hall Pirates 74, #7 Connecticut Huskies 66
Pts: R. Ramos – 21; Rebs: D. Walker – 10; Asts: G. Greene – 8	Pts: K. Gamble – 19; Rebs: K. Gamble – 7 Asts: T. George – 4 Halftime Score: Seton Hall, 31-30

Madison Square Garden – New York City, New York
Attendance: 19,591
Referees: Jody Sylvester, Larry Lembo, Bob Donato

=== Semifinals summary ===
CBS

Saturday, March 11
1:30 PM EST

#3 Syracuse Orangemen 81, #2 Seton Hall Pirates 78
Pts: – 27; Rebs: – 10; Asts: – 4	Pts: J. Morton – 27; Rebs: A. Gaze – 9 Asts: G. Greene – 6 Halftime Score: Seton Hall, 39-36

Madison Square Garden – New York City, New York
Attendance: 19,591
Referees: Larry Lembo, Joe Mingle, Gene Monje

== Announcers ==
Seed	Teams	Flagship station	Play-by-play announcer	Color analyst(s)
2	Seton Hall	WPAT–AM		

== Awards ==
Dave Gavitt Trophy (Most Valuable Player): Charles Smith, Georgetown

All Tournament Team

- Dana Barros, Boston College
- Sherman Douglas, Syracuse
- John Morton, Seton Hall
- Alonzo Mourning, Georgetown
- Ramón Ramos, Seton Hall
- Charles Smith, Georgetown
