= 1989 NCAA Division I men's basketball championship game =

American college basketball final

1989 NCAA tournament championship game
National championship game
Michigan Wolverines	Seton Hall Pirates
Big Ten	Big East
(29–7)	(31–6)
80	79
Head coach: Steve Fisher	Head coach: P.J. Carlesimo
- AP: 10
- Coaches: 10
- AP: 11
- Coaches: 11
	1st half	2nd half	OT	Total
Michigan Wolverines	37	34	9	80
Seton Hall Pirates	32	39	8	79
- Date: April 3, 1989
- Venue: Kingdome, Seattle, Washington
- MVP: Glen Rice, Michigan
- Favorite: Seton Hall by 2.5
- Referees: Mickey Crowley, Tom Rucker, John Clougherty
- Attendance: 39,187

United States TV coverage
- Network: CBS
- Announcers: Brent Musburger (play-by-play); Billy Packer (color)

The 1989 NCAA Division I men's basketball championship game was the final round of the 1989 NCAA Division I men's basketball tournament. It determined the national champion for the 1988–89 NCAA Division I men's basketball season, and was contested by the Southeast Regional Champions, No. 3-seeded Michigan Wolverines of the Big Ten and the West Regional Champions, No. 3-seeded Seton Hall Pirates of the Big East. Both teams were seeking their first national title. The game was played on April 3, 1989, at the Kingdome in Seattle, Washington.

Michigan defeated Seton Hall, 80–79 in OT, to claim their first national championship in basketball. It was also the first title for interim head coach Steve Fisher. Wolverine senior forward Glen Rice was named the NCAA Tournament Most Outstanding Player (MOP) as he established the tournament scoring record with 184 points.

== Participating teams ==
=== Michigan Wolverines ===
==== First round vs. #14 Xavier ====
NCAA Productions
ESPN

Friday, March 17
12:07 PM EST

box score

#3 Michigan Wolverines 92, #14 Xavier Musketeers 87
Pts: G. Rice, R. Robinson - 23; Rebs: M. Hughes - 10; Asts: R. Robinson - 8	Pts: T. Hill - 21; Rebs: D. Strong - 10; Asts: J. Walker - 9 Halftime Score: Xavier, 45-42

Omni Coliseum - Atlanta, GA
Attendance: 12,349
Referees: Nick Borucki, Dave Libbey, Bob Barnett

==== Second Round vs. #11 South Alabama ====
CBS

Sunday, March 19
2:20 PM EST

box score

#3 Michigan Wolverines 91, #11 South Alabama Jaguars 82
Pts: G. Rice - 36; Rebs: G. Rice - 8 Asts: D. Calip, T. Mills, G. Rice, R. Robinson - 5	Pts: J. Lewis - 25; Rebs: G. Estaba, J. Lewis - 9 Asts: T. Brodnick - 6 Halftime Score: South Alabama, 47-44

Omni Coliseum - Atlanta, GA
Attendance: 12,821
Referees: Dave Libbey, Gene Monje, Bob Barnett

==== Regional semifinals vs. #2 North Carolina ====
CBS

Thursday, March 23
approx. 10:11 PM EST

box score

#3 Michigan Wolverines 92, #2 North Carolina Tar Heels 87
Pts: G. Rice - 34; Rebs: M. Hughes, T. Mills, G. Rice, L. Vaught - 6 Asts: R. Robinson - 13	Pts: J.R. Reid - 26; Rebs: S. Bucknall - 7 Asts: S. Bucknall - 10; Halftime Score: Michigan, 50-47

Rupp Arena - Lexington, KY
Attendance: 22,314
Referees: Don Rutledge, Tom Scott, Wally Tanner

==== Regional finals vs. #5 Virginia ====
CBS

Saturday, March 25
1:58 PM EST

box score

#3 Michigan Wolverines 102, #5 Virginia Cavaliers 65
Pts: G. Rice - 32; Rebs: L. Vaught - 9 Asts: R. Robinson - 7	Pts: R. Morgan - 15; Rebs: B. Dabbs - 12; Asts: J. Crotty - 7 Halftime Score: Michigan, 44-25

Rupp Arena - Lexington, KY
Attendance: 22,755
Referees: Mickey Crowley, Jim Burr, Frank Bosone

==== Final Four vs. #1 Illinois ====
CBS

Saturday, April, 1
approx. 5:12 PM PST/8:12 PM EST

box score

#SE3 Michigan Wolverines 83, #MW1 Illinois Fighting Illini 81
Pts: G. Rice - 28; Rebs: L. Vaught - 16; Asts: R. Robinson - 12	Pts: K. Battle - 29; Rebs: L. Hamilton - 9 Asts: S. Bardo - 8 Halftime Score: Michigan, 39-38

Kingdome - Seattle, WA
Attendance: 39,187
Referees: Ted Hillary, David Jones, Tom Harrington

=== Seton Hall Pirates ===
==== First round vs. #14 Southwest Missouri State ====
NCAA Productions
ESPN

Friday, March 17
approx. 2:37 PM MST/4:37 PM EST

box score

#3 Seton Hall Pirates 60, #14 Southwest Missouri State Bears 51
Pts: J. Morton - 26; Rebs: D. Walker - 6 Asts: A. Gaze - 4	Pts: H. Henderson - 18; Rebs: H. Henderson - 6 Asts: D. Lewis - 6 Halftime Score: Seton Hall, 30-23

McKale Center - Tucson, AZ
Attendance: 12,787
Referees: Don Shea, Allie Prescott, Jim Loustaldt

==== Second Round vs. #11 Evansville ====
CBS

Sunday, March 19
12:25 PM MST/2:25 PM EST

box score

#3 Seton Hall Pirates 87, #11 Evansville Aces 73
Pts: J. Morton - 17; Rebs: R. Ramos, D. Walker - 10; Asts: G. Greene, P. Wigington - 5	Pts: S. Haffner - 20; Rebs: D. Godfread - 6 Asts: R. Crafton - 7 Halftime Score: Seton Hall, 49-41

McKale Center - Tucson, AZ
Attendance: 13,391
Referees: John Moreau, Sid Rodeheffer, Mark DiStaolo

==== Regional semifinals vs. #2 Indiana ====
CBS

Thursday, March 23
6:09 PM MST/8:09 PM EST

box score

#3 Seton Hall Pirates 78, #2 Indiana Hoosiers 65
Pts: J. Morton - 17; Rebs: D. Walker - 10; Asts: G. Greene - 5	Pts: J. Edwards - 18; Rebs: E. Anderson - 6 Asts: J. Hillman, L. Jones - 3 Halftime Score: Seton Hall, 42-33

McNichols Sports Arena - Denver, CO
Attendance: 16,813
Referees: Jody Sylvester, Dave Libbey, David Bair

==== Regional finals vs. #4 UNLV ====
CBS

Saturday, March 25
2:05 PM MST/4:05 PM EST

box score

#3 Seton Hall Pirates 84, #4 UNLV Runnin' Rebels 61
Pts: A. Gaze - 19; Rebs: D. Walker - 15; Asts: G. Greene - 3	Pts: G. Anthony - 16; Rebs: M. Scurry - 14; Asts: G. Anthony - 4 Halftime Score: Seton Hall, 34-30

McNichols Sports Arena - Denver, CO
Attendance: 16,813
Referees: Lenny Wirtz, David Dodge, Larry Rose

==== Final Four vs. #2 Duke ====
CBS

Saturday, April 1
2:42 PM PST/5:42 PM EST

box score

#W3 Seton Hall Pirates 95, #E2 Duke Blue Devils 78
Pts: A. Gaze - 20; Rebs: R. Ramos - 12; Asts: G. Greene - 8	Pts: D. Ferry - 34; Rebs: D. Ferry - 10; Asts: P. Henderson - 5 Halftime Score: Duke, 38-33

Kingdome - Seattle, WA
Attendance: 39,187
Referees: Larry Lembo, Don Rutledge, Ed Hightower

== Game summary ==
Michigan trailed by three, 79–76, with less than a minute remaining in overtime when Terry Mills hit a turnaround 11-footer to cut the Seton Hall lead to 79–78. After a defensive stop, the Pirates' Gerald Greene was controversially called for a foul on Rumeal Robinson with three seconds left in overtime. Robinson made both free throws, and, after Seton Hall's last-second shot came up short, Michigan won its first national championship.

CBS

Monday, April 3, 1989
6:12 PM PDT/9:12 PM EDT

box score

#SE3 Michigan Wolverines 80, #W3 Seton Hall Pirates 79 (OT)
Scoring by half: 37–32, 34–39 Overtime: 9–8
Pts: Glen Rice - 31; Rebs: Glen Rice - 11; Asts: Rumeal Robinson - 11	Pts: John Morton - 35; Rebs: Daryll Walker - 11; Asts: Gerald Greene - 5

Kingdome, Seattle, Washington
Attendance: 39,187
Referees: Mickey Crowley, Tom Rucker, John Clougherty

Starters:			Pts	Reb	Ast
G	21	Rumeal Robinson	21	3	11
G	11	Mike Griffin	0	4	3
F	41	Glen Rice	31	11	0
F	35	Loy Vaught	8	7	0
C	52	Terry Mills	8	6	2
Reserves:					
G/F	24	Sean Higgins	10	9	2
C	55	Mark Hughes	2	2	0
G	13	Demetrius Calip	0	0	1
Head coach:
Steve Fisher

Michigan	Seton Hall

Michigan	Statistics	Seton Hall
30/67 (45%)	Field goals	28/65 (43%)
6/16 (38%)	3-pt. field goals	7/23 (30%)
14/16 (88%)	Free throws	16/22 (73%)
11	Offensive rebounds	7
31	Defensive rebounds	27
42	Total rebounds	34
19	Assists	14
14	Turnovers	11
3	Steals	4
4	Blocks	2
16	Fouls	23

Starters:			Pts	Reb	Ast
G	15	Gerald Greene	13	5	5
G	24	Daryll Walker	13	11	1
F	10	Andrew Gaze	5	3	3
F	23	John Morton	35	4	3
C	25	Ramón Ramos	9	5	1
Reserves:					
F	31	Mike Cooper	0	2	0
F	32	Anthony Avent	2	3	1
G	30	Frantz Volcy	0	1	0
C	4	Pookey Wigington	2	0	0
Head coach:
P. J. Carlesimo

== Aftermath ==
As of 2026, this is the only appearance in the championship game for the Pirates. Since 1989, the closest Seton Hall got to another Final Four was the Elite Eight in 1991, where they lost to then-undefeated UNLV.

Michigan would make four more appearances in the national championship game after this in 1992, 1993, 2013, and 2018 (the former two were later vacated due to NCAA sanctions revolving around the eligibility of Chris Webber in a scandal), and the Wolverines would lose all four, which brought their record in the championship game to 1–6, the worst record among teams that have previously won a championship. However, Michigan would eventually win the championship again in 2026 over UConn.
