= Glenn Mosley =

Glenn Mosley may refer to:

- Glenn Mosley (minister), American reverend and theologian
- Glenn Mosley (basketball) (born 1955), American basketball player
