= 1988–89 Seton Hall Pirates men's basketball team =

American college basketball season

1988–89 Seton Hall Pirates men's basketball

NCAA tournament, Runner-up Great Alaska Shootout champions

National Championship Game, L 79-80 ^{OT} vs. Michigan
- Conference: Big East Conference

Ranking
- Coaches: No. 11
- AP: No. 11
- Record: 31–7 (11–5 Big East)
- Head coach: P.J. Carlesimo (7th season)
- Home arena: Walsh Gymnasium; Meadowlands Arena

1988–89 Big East men's basketball standings
	Conf.				Overall
Team	W		L	PCT	W		L	PCT
No. 2 Georgetown †	13	–	3	.813	29	–	5	.853
No. 11 Seton Hall	11	–	5	.688	31	–	7	.816
No. 7 Syracuse	10	–	6	.625	30	–	8	.789
Pittsburgh	9	–	7	.563	17	–	13	.567
Villanova	7	–	9	.438	18	–	16	.529
Providence	7	–	9	.438	18	–	11	.621
Connecticut	6	–	10	.375	18	–	13	.581
St. John's	6	–	10	.375	20	–	13	.606
Boston College	3	–	13	.188	12	–	17	.414
† 1989 Big East tournament winner As of April 3, 1989; Rankings from AP poll

The 1988–89 Seton Hall Pirates men's basketball team represented Seton Hall University as members of the Big East Conference during the 1988–89 NCAA men's basketball season. The Pirates were led by seventh year head coach P.J. Carlesimo. They played their home games at Walsh Gymnasium and Meadowlands Arena. Unranked to start the season, Seton Hall finished the season as national runner-up with a 31–7 overall record (11–5 in Big East play).

As the No. 3 seed in the West Regional of the 1989 NCAA tournament, they defeated Southwest Missouri State, Evansville, Indiana, and UNLV to reach the Final Four. In the national semifinals, the Pirates dispatched Duke 95–78. The magical tournament run ended with an 80–79 overtime loss to Michigan in the National Championship Game.

== Roster ==
1988–89 Seton Hall Pirates men's basketball team
Players
Coaches

Pos.	#	Name	Height	Weight	Year	Previous school	Hometown
F/C	32	Anthony Avent	6 ft 9 in (2.06 m)	235 lb (107 kg)	Fr	Malcolm X Shabazz	Newark, New Jersey
F	31	Mike Cooper	6 ft 5 in (1.96 m)	—	Jr
	21	Trevor Crowley	6 ft 4 in (1.93 m)	—	Jr
F	10	Andrew Gaze	6 ft 7 in (2.01 m)	209 lb (95 kg)	Jr	Albert Park High School	Melbourne, Australia
PG	15	Gerald Greene	6 ft 1 in (1.85 m)	—	Sr
	52	Nick Katsikis	6 ft 5 in (1.96 m)	—	Jr
	20	Khyiem Long	6 ft 7 in (2.01 m)	—	Sr
G	42	Rene Monteserin	6 ft 0 in (1.83 m)	—	Fr
G	23	John Morton	6 ft 3 in (1.91 m)	180 lb (82 kg)	Sr	Walton High School	Bronx, New York
F/C	25	Ramón Ramos	6 ft 8 in (2.03 m)	231 lb (105 kg)	Sr		Canóvanas, Puerto Rico
G	14	Jose Rebimbas	6 ft 0 in (1.83 m)	—	Jr
	30	Frantz Volcy	6 ft 8 in (2.03 m)	—	Jr
F	24	Daryll Walker	6 ft 8 in (2.03 m)	—	Sr
G	4	Pookey Wigington	5 ft 4 in (1.63 m)	—	Sr		Inglewood, California

Head coach

- P.J. Carlesimo

Assistant coach(es)

- Rod Baker
- John Carroll
- Bruce Hamburger
- Tom Sullivan

Legend

- (C) Team captain
- (S) Suspended
- (I) Ineligible
- (W) Walk-on
- Injured
- Current redshirt

Roster
Last update: 2016-Feb-21

== Schedule ==
Date time, TV	Rank^{#}	Opponent^{#}	Result	Record	High points	High rebounds	High assists	Site (attendance) city, state
Regular season
11/25/88*; 7:30 p.m.		vs. Utah; Great Alaska Shootout quarterfinals	W 86–68	1–0	22 – Morton	12 – Ramos	6 – Morton	Sullivan Arena (4,336); Anchorage, AK
11/26/88*; 4:00 p.m., ESPN		vs. Kentucky; Great Alaska Shootout semifinals	W 63–60	2–0	13 – Walker	7 – Tied	3 – Greene	Sullivan Arena (3,250); Anchorage, AK
11/28/88*; 11:00 p.m., ESPN		vs. Kansas; Great Alaska Shootout finals	W 92–81	3–0	18 – Gaze	7 – Cooper	7 – Wigington	Sullivan Arena (5,372); Anchorage, AK
12/02/88*; 6:30 p.m.		Central Connecticut; SHU Tipoff Tournament semifinals	W 81–42	4–0	22 – Morton	10 – Ramos	6 – Greene	Walsh Gymnasium (3,200); South Orange, NJ
12/03/88*; 8:30 p.m.		Mount St. Mary's; SHU Tipoff Tournament finals	W 107–75	5–0	21 – Gaze	10 – Ramos	6 – Gaze	Walsh Gymnasium (3,200); South Orange, NJ
12/06/88*; 8:00 p.m.	No. 20	St. Peter's	W 90–63	6–0	17 – Morton	9 – Ramos	6 – Wigington	Walsh Gymnasium (3,200); South Orange, NJ
12/10/88; 9:30 p.m., ESPN	No. 20	St. John's	W 74–63	7–0 (1–0)	17 – Morton	8 – Gaze	6 – Greene	Alumni Hall (6,008); Jamaica, NY
12/13/88*; 8:00 p.m.	No. 17	Rutgers	W 96–70	8–0	22 – Morton	10 – Morton	7 – Morton	Walsh Gymnasium (3,200); South Orange, NJ
12/16/88*; 8:00 p.m.	No. 17	at Fordham	W 78–64	9–0	22 – Greene	11 – Tied	4 – Tied	Rose Hill Gym (3,115); Bronx, NY
12/22/88*; 8:00 p.m.	No. 15	Princeton	W 64–46	10–0	16 – Morton	8 – Walker	4 – Greene	Walsh Gymnasium (3,200); South Orange, NJ
12/28/88*; 7:30 p.m.	No. 13	vs. Virginia; Sugar Bowl Tournament semifinals	W 84–67	11–0	18 – Morton	10 – Ramos	4 – Gaze	Louisiana Superdome (4,915); New Orleans, LA
12/29/88*; 10:00 p.m.	No. 13	vs. DePaul; Sugar Bowl Tournament finals	W 83–60	12–0	16 – Gaze	12 – Avent	6 – Greene	Louisiana Superdome (6,514); New Orleans, LA
01/03/89; 8:00 p.m., Big East TV Network	No. 10	No. 5 Georgetown	W 94–86	13–0 (2–0)	20 – Tied	17 – Walker	5 – Tied	Meadowlands Arena (19,761); East Rutherford, NJ
01/07/89; 8:00 p.m., Big East TV Network	No. 10	at No. 2 Syracuse	L 66–90	13–1 (2–1)	15 – Volcy	6 – Walker	6 – Greene	Carrier Dome (32,037); Syracuse, NY
01/11/89*; 8:00 p.m.	No. 13	at Iona	W 74–58	14–1	18 – Morton	11 – Walker	6 – Greene	Westchester County Center (2,629); White Plains, NY
01/14/89; 8:00 p.m., Big East TV Network	No. 13	Connecticut	W 76–62	15–1 (3–1)	21 – Walker	10 – Avent	4 – Greene	Meadowlands Arena (11,782); East Rutherford, NJ
01/16/89; 8:00 p.m., Big East TV Network	No. 13	Villanova	W 78–61	16–1 (4–1)	22 – Morton	8 – Walker	5 – Morton	Meadowlands Arena (15,127); East Rutherford, NJ
01/22/89*; 1:00 p.m.	No. 12	New Hampshire	W 108–67	17–1	20 – Tied	10 – Avent	9 – Greene	Walsh Gymnasium (3,200); South Orange, NJ
01/25/89; 8:00 p.m., ESPN	No. 9	Pittsburgh	L 79–82	17–2 (4–2)	23 – Greene	9 – Ramos	6 – Greene	Meadowlands Arena (10,975); East Rutherford, NJ
01/28/89; 8:00 p.m., Big East TV Network	No. 9	Boston College	W 103–79	18–2 (5–2)	30 – Morton	8 – Volcy	10 – Greene	Meadowlands Arena (10,721); East Rutherford, NJ
02/01/89; 8:00 p.m., Big East TV Network	No. 10	at No. 6 Georgetown	L 66–74	18–3 (5–3)	15 – Morton	11 – Ramos	7 – Greene	Capital Centre (14,185); Landover, MD
02/04/89; 8:00 p.m., Big East TV Network	No. 10	at Boston College	W 105–82	19–3 (6–3)	20 – Morton	13 – Ramos	6 – Greene	Conte Forum (8,291); Chestnut Hill, MA
02/06/89; 7:30 p.m., ESPN	No. 10	No. 14 Syracuse	L 79–85	19–4 (6–4)	24 – Ramos	10 – Ramos	7 – Gaze	Meadowlands Arena (19,761); East Rutherford, NJ
02/11/89; 8:00 p.m., Big East TV Network	No. 11	at Villanova	W 83–77	20–4 (7–4)	23 – Morton	12 – Ramos	5 – Greene	du Pont Pavilion (6,500); Villanova, PA
02/15/89; 8:00 p.m., ESPN	No. 12	at Connecticut	W 72–69	21–4 (8–4)	27 – Ramos	8 – Gaze	7 – Greene	Hartford Civic Center (15,122); Hartford, CT
02/18/89; 8:00 p.m., Big East TV Network	No. 12	at Pittsburgh	L 76–82	21–5 (8–5)	25 – Ramos	8 – Ramos	6 – Greene	Fitzgerald Field House (6,798); Pittsburgh, PA
02/21/89; 8:00 p.m., Big East TV Network	No. 15	St. John's	W 63–60	22–5 (9–5)	22 – Morton	11 – Ramos	3 – Ramos	Meadowlands Arena (13,126); East Rutherford, NJ
02/25/89; 1:00 p.m., Big East TV Network	No. 15	Providence	W 84–80	23–5 (10–5)	26 – Tied	10 – Tied	5 – Tied	Meadowlands Arena (14,147); East Rutherford, NJ
03/01/89; 7:00 p.m., ESPN	No. 12	at Providence	W 80–68	24–5 (11–5)	20 – Walker	9 – Ramos	7 – Greene	Providence Civic Center (12,733); Providence, RI
03/05/89*; 1:00 p.m.	No. 12	Brooklyn College	W 88–55	25–5	15 – Morton	11 – Ramos	7 – Greene	Walsh Gymnasium (3,200); South Orange, NJ
Big East tournament
03/10/89*; 12:00 p.m., Big East TV Network	(2) No. 11	vs. (7) Connecticut; Big East tournament quarterfinals	W 74–66	26–5	21 – Ramos	10 – Walker	8 – Greene	Madison Square Garden (19,591); New York City, NY
03/11/89*; 1:30 p.m., CBS	(2) No. 11	vs. (3) No. 5 Syracuse; Big East tournament semifinals	L 78–81	26–6	27 – Morton	9 – Gaze	6 – Greene	Madison Square Garden (19,591); New York City, NY
NCAA tournament
03/17/89*; 4:37 p.m., ESPN; NCAA Productions	(W3) No. 11	vs. (W14) SW Missouri State; NCAA first round	W 60–51	27–6	26 – Morton	6 – Walker	4 – Gaze	McKale Center (12,787); Tucson, AZ
03/19/89*; 2:25 p.m., CBS	(W3) No. 11	vs. (W11) Evansville; NCAA second round	W 87–73	28–6	17 – Morton	7 – Walker	5 – Tied	McKale Center (13,391); Tucson, AZ
03/23/89*; 8:09 p.m., CBS	(W3) No. 11	(W2) No. 8 Indiana; NCAA regional semifinals	W 78–65	29–6	17 – Morton	10 – Walker	4 – Greene	McNichols Arena (16,813); Denver, CO
03/25/89*; 4:05 p.m., CBS	(W3) No. 11	(W4) No. 15 UNLV; NCAA Regional Final	W 84–61	30–6	19 – Gaze	15 – Walker	5 – Greene	McNichols Arena (16,813); Denver, CO
04/01/89*; 5:42 p.m., CBS	(W3) No. 11	vs. (E2) No. 9 Duke; NCAA National semifinals	W 95–78	31–6	20 – Gaze	12 – Ramos	8 – Greene	Kingdome (39,187); Seattle, WA
04/03/89*; 9:12 p.m., CBS	(W3) No. 11	vs. (SE4) No. 10 Michigan; NCAA National Final	L 79–80 ^{OT}	31–7	35 – Morton	11 – Walker	5 – Greene	Kingdome (39,187); Seattle, WA
*Non-conference game. ^{#}Rankings from AP Poll. (#) Tournament seedings in parentheses. W=West Region. All times are in Eastern Time E=East Region SE=Southeast Region.

== Rankings ==
Ranking movement Legend: ██ Improvement in ranking. ██ Decrease in ranking. RV=Received votes.
Poll	Pre	Wk 1	Wk 2	Wk 3	Wk 4	Wk 5	Wk 6	Wk 7	Wk 8	Wk 9	Wk 10	Wk 11	Wk 12	Wk 13	Wk 14	Wk 15	Wk 16	Final
AP	NR	NR	NR	20	17	15	13	10	13	12	9	10	11	12	15	12	11	11
UPI	NR	NR	20	19	15	13	13	10	13	13	9	8	8	11	14	12	11	11

== Player statistics ==
Player	G	GS	MIN	FG	FGA	Pct.	3–FG	3–FGA	Pct.	FT	FTA	Pct.	REB	PF	AST	TO	BLK	STL	PTS	Avg.
John Morton	38	37	1082	210	482	.436	79	189	.418	159	194	.820	129	106	95	81	14	49	658	17.3
Andrew Gaze	38	37	1240	170	334	.509	94	221	.425	82	113	.726	172	108	110	81	19	36	516	13.6
Ramón Ramos	37	36	1016	161	303	.531	0	0	.000	119	149	.799	283	96	49	63	46	24	441	11.9
Daryll Walker	38	38	1044	147	283	.519	0	2	.000	144	183	.787	272	116	40	79	16	37	438	11.5
Gerald Greene	38	38	1192	91	216	.421	33	77	.429	129	173	.746	106	88	195	108	4	38	344	9.1
Frantz Volcy	37	1	462	72	129	.558	0	0	.000	47	69	.681	100	71	32	30	25	6	191	5.2
Mike Cooper	37	1	577	74	136	.544	0	0	.000	29	48	.604	116	71	32	36	16	12	177	4.8
Anthony Avent	38	1	395	68	149	.456	0	0	.000	32	49	.653	114	63	12	38	27	6	168	4.4
Khyiem Long	12	1	70	11	17	.647	0	0	.000	6	9	.667	19	8	4	7	3	2	28	2.3
Pookey Wigington	32	0	258	13	38	.342	1	3	.333	32	41	.780	22	33	52	37	1	13	59	1.8
Nick Katsikis	31	0	142	18	35	.514	11	22	.500	2	4	.500	19	19	14	10	2	4	49	1.6
Trevor Crowley	21	0	81	10	32	.313	6	20	.300	0	0	.000	7	7	6	6	0	4	26	1.2
Rene Monteserin	15	0	29	3	8	.375	0	0	.000	1	2	.500	0	3	5	6	0	1	7	0.5
Jose Rebimbas	16	0	37	1	4	.250	0	1	.000	3	5	.600	4	6	6	4	0	2	5	0.3
Seton Hall	38		7625	1049	2166	.484	224	535	.419	785	1039	.756	1513	795	632	586	173	234	3107	81.8
Opponents	38		7625	934	2265	.412	150	455	.330	613	881	.696	1252	840	470	523	128	259	2631	69.2

- Deadball rebounds: SHU 83, Opponents 104
- Team Rebounds: SHU 150, Opponents 158

== Awards and honors ==
- P. J. Carlesimo – Big East Coach of the Year
- John Morton – Third-team All-Big East, AP Honorable Mention All-American
- Ramón Ramos – First-team All-Big East, AP Honorable Mention All-American

== Local Radio ==
Station	Play–by–play	Color analyst	Studio host
WPAT–AM 930			

- –Some games broadcast on WPAT-FM 93.1 because of broadcast conflict with the New York Knicks of the (NBA) and the New York Rangers of the (NHL).
