= 1989 National Invitation Tournament =

Annual NCAA college basketball competition

- Season: 1988–89
- Teams: 32
- Finals site: Madison Square Garden, New York City
- Champions: St. John's Redmen (5th title)
- Runner-up: Saint Louis Billikens (3rd title game)
- Semifinalists: UAB Blazers (1st semifinal); Michigan State Spartans (1st semifinal)
- Winning coach: Lou Carnesecca (1st title)
- MVP: Jayson Williams (St. John's)

The 1989 National Invitation Tournament was the 1989 edition of the annual NCAA college basketball competition.

== Selected teams ==
Below is a list of the 32 teams selected for the tournament.

Team	Conference
Akron	Independent
Arkansas State	American South Conference
Boise State	Big Sky Conference
California	Pac-10 Conference
Charlotte	Sun Belt Conference
Connecticut	Big East Conference
Georgia Southern	Trans America Athletic Conference
Hawaii	Western Athletic Conference
Kent State	Mid-American Conference
Michigan State	Big Ten Conference
Murray State	Ohio Valley Conference
Nebraska	Big Eight Conference
New Mexico	Western Athletic Conference
New Mexico State	Big West Conference
New Orleans	American South Conference
Ohio State	Big Ten Conference
Oklahoma State	Big Eight Conference
Ole Miss	Southeast Conference
Penn State	Atlantic 10 Conference
Pepperdine	West Coast Athletic Conference
Richmond	Colonial Athletic Association
St. John's	Big East Conference
Saint Louis	Midwest Collegiate Conference
Saint Peter's	Metro Atlantic Athletic Conference
Santa Clara	West Coast Athletic Conference
Southern Illinois	Missouri Valley Conference
Temple	Atlantic 10 Conference
UAB	Sun Belt Conference
UC Santa Barbara	Big West Conference
Villanova	Big East Conference
Wichita State	Missouri Valley Conference
Wisconsin	Big Ten Conference

== Bracket ==
Below are the four first round brackets, along with the four-team championship bracket.

First Round
Connecticut	67
Charlotte	62
California	73
Hawaii	57
UAB	83
Georgia Southern	74
Richmond	70
Temple	56

Second Round
Connecticut	73
California	72
UAB	64
Richmond	61

Quarterfinals
Connecticut	79
UAB	85

First Round
St. John's	70
Ole Miss	67
Oklahoma State	69
Boise State	55
Nebraska	81
Arkansas State	79
Ohio State	81
Akron	70

Second Round
St. John's	76
Oklahoma State	64
Nebraska	74
Ohio State	85

Quarterfinals
St. John's	83
Ohio State	80

First Round
Villanova	76
Saint Peter's	56
Penn State	89
Murray State	73
Michigan State	83
Kent State	69
Wichita State	70
UC Santa Barbara	62

Second Round
Villanova	76
Penn State	67
Michigan State	79
Wichita State	67

Quarterfinals
Villanova	63
Michigan State	70

First Round
New Mexico	91
Santa Clara	76
Pepperdine	84
New Mexico State	69
Wisconsin	63
New Orleans	61
Saint Louis	87
Southern Illinois	54

Second Round
New Mexico	86
Pepperdine	69
Wisconsin	68
Saint Louis	73

Quarterfinals
New Mexico	65
Saint Louis	66

=== Semifinals & finals ===
Semifinals
UAB	65
St. John's	76
Michigan State	64
Saint Louis	74

Finals
St. John's	73
Saint Louis	65

Third place game
UAB	78
Michigan State	76

== See also ==
- 1989 National Women's Invitational Tournament
- 1989 NCAA Division I men's basketball tournament
- 1989 NCAA Division II men's basketball tournament
- 1989 NCAA Division III men's basketball tournament
- 1989 NCAA Division I women's basketball tournament
- 1989 NCAA Division II women's basketball tournament
- 1989 NCAA Division III women's basketball tournament
- 1989 NAIA Division I men's basketball tournament
- 1989 NAIA Division I women's basketball tournament
