= Big East Conference Men's Basketball Freshman of the Year =

Annual basketball award

The Big East Conference Men's Basketball Freshman of the Year, known as Big East Conference Men's Basketball Rookie of the Year from 1989 to 2015, is a Rookie of the Year award given annually by the Big East Conference to one or more men's basketball players in their first year of competitive play. It was first awarded by the original Big East Conference at the end of its inaugural 1979–80 season. When the conference split along football lines in 2013, the seven schools of the original Big East that did not play FBS football joined with three other schools and formed a new Big East Conference, with the FBS schools remaining in the former Big East structure under the new name American Athletic Conference (marketed as "The American"). While both offshoot conferences claim the same 1979 starting date and administrative history, the athletic history of the original league is claimed only by the current Big East.

The award, like the other conference awards, is voted on by conference coaches. Coaches are not permitted to vote for players on their teams. The recipient of the award is announced at a press conference immediately preceding the Big East men's basketball tournament, at the same time as the Big East Conference Men's Basketball Player of the Year and the Scholar-Athlete of the Year awards. The ceremony takes place at Madison Square Garden during the tournament. The most recent award recipient was Cam Whitmore of Villanova University.

The award was introduced in 1980 following the conference's first season, awarded to David Russell of St. John's. Through the 1987–88 season, the award was known as the "Freshman of the Year"; from the 1988–89 through the 2014–15 season, it was known as "Rookie of the Year", and first-year transfers were eligible for the award alongside freshmen. The award once again became "Freshman of the Year" in the 2015–2016 season, with eligibility restricted to freshmen. The award has been shared twice—first after the 2004–05 season by Rudy Gay and Jeff Green, and again after the 2007–08 season by Jonny Flynn and DeJuan Blair. As such, the award has been presented 40 times. As only freshmen are eligible (with first-year transfers also eligible from 1989 to 2015), it is impossible to win the award more than once. However, the coaches in the conference also award a Preseason Rookie of the Year to one or more players before the start of the NCAA basketball season.

== Winners ==
Season	Player	School
1979–80	David Russell	St. John's
1980–81	Fred Brown	Georgetown
1981–82	Patrick Ewing	Georgetown
1982–83	Earl Kelley	UConn (Note: The University of Connecticut used "Connecticut" as its primary athletic brand until the 2013–14 school year, when it officially adopted its long-used short form of "UConn".)
1983–84	Dwayne Washington	Syracuse
1984–85	Charles Smith	Pittsburgh
1985–86	Dana Barros	Boston College
1986–87	Derrick Coleman	Syracuse
1987–88	Sean Miller	Pittsburgh
1988–89	Brian Shorter	Pittsburgh
1989–90	Nadav Henefeld	UConn
1990–91	Bill Curley	Boston College
1991–92	Lawrence Moten	Syracuse
1992–93	Othella Harrington	Georgetown
1993–94	Doron Sheffer	UConn
1994–95	Allen Iverson	Georgetown
1995–96	Scoonie Penn	Boston College
1996–97	Tim Thomas	Villanova
1997–98	Khalid El-Amin	UConn
1998–99	Troy Murphy	Notre Dame
1999–00	Troy Bell	Boston College
2000–01	Eddie Griffin	Seton Hall
2001–02	Chris Thomas	Notre Dame
2002–03	Carmelo Anthony	Syracuse
2003–04	Chris Taft	Pittsburgh
2004–05	Rudy Gay	UConn
2004–05	Jeff Green	Georgetown
2005–06	Dominic James	Marquette
2006–07	Scottie Reynolds	Villanova
2007–08	Jonny Flynn	Syracuse
2007–08	DeJuan Blair	Pittsburgh
2008–09	Greg Monroe	Georgetown
2009–10	Lance Stephenson	Cincinnati
2010–11	Cleveland Melvin	DePaul
2011–12	Moe Harkless	St. John's
2012–13	JaKarr Sampson	St. John's
2013–14	Billy Garrett Jr.	DePaul
2014–15	Ángel Delgado	Seton Hall
2015–16	Henry Ellenson	Marquette
2016–17	Justin Patton	Creighton
2017–18	Omari Spellman	Villanova
2018–19	James Akinjo	Georgetown
2019–20	Jeremiah Robinson-Earl	Villanova
2020–21	Posh Alexander	St. John's
2021–22	Ryan Nembhard	Creighton
2022–23	Cam Whitmore	Villanova
2023–24	Stephon Castle	UConn
2024–25	Liam McNeeley	UConn
2025–26	Nigel James Jr.	Marquette

== Winners by school ==
Georgetown University leads the award count as of 2023 with seven. The Big East split into two conferences in July 2013. One of the leagues, which initially included only schools that do not sponsor FBS football, retained the Big East name. This group of schools, whose core members are collectively known as the "Catholic 7", includes Georgetown. The other league, which was made up entirely of FBS football schools until non-football school Wichita State University joined in 2017, maintains the charter of the original Big East but now operates as the American Athletic Conference. The University of Connecticut, which initially remained in the renamed conference before rejoining in 2020, has the second most winners, with six. Only 13 of the 23 teams that have participated in Big East Conference men's basketball have had players win the Rookie of the Year award. Member schools which have never won the award include Providence College (in the current Big East), Rutgers University (which left The American for the Big Ten Conference in 2014), the University of Louisville (which left The American for the Atlantic Coast Conference in 2014), the University of South Florida (now in The American), and two schools which joined the current Big East from other conferences in 2013: Butler University and Xavier University. Schools which left the Big East without winning the award include the University of Miami, Virginia Tech, and West Virginia University. Boston College was a founding member in 1979, and left the Big East for the ACC in 2005. Because the college basketball season spans the new year, the year awarded is the year in which that season ended.

School (year joined)	Winners	Years
Georgetown (1979)	7	1981, 1982, 1993, 1995, 2005, 2009, 2019
UConn (1979, 2020) (Note: Following the split of the conference, Cincinnati and UConn (along with three other schools that never had a winner: Louisville, Rutgers, and South Florida) remained in the football-sponsoring portion now known as The American. UConn returned to the reconfigured Big East in 2020.)	7	1983, 1990, 1994, 1998, 2005, 2024, 2025
Pittsburgh (1982) (Note: Notre Dame, Pittsburgh, and Syracuse left for the Atlantic Coast Conference (ACC) in 2013.)	5	1985, 1988, 1989, 2004, 2008
Syracuse (1979)	5	1984, 1987, 1992, 2003, 2008
Villanova (1980)	5	1997, 2007, 2018, 2020, 2023
Boston College (1979) (Note: Boston College left for the ACC in 2005.)	4	1986, 1991, 1996, 2000
St. John's (1979)	4	1980, 2012, 2013, 2021
Marquette (2005)	3	2006, 2016, 2026
DePaul (2005)	2	2011, 2014
Notre Dame (1995)	2	1999, 2002
Seton Hall (1979)	2	2001, 2015
Cincinnati (2005)	1	2010
Creighton (2013)	1	2017

== See also ==
- Big East Conference Men's Basketball Player of the Year
- Big East Conference Women's Basketball Player of the Year
- Big East Conference Men's Basketball Defensive Player of the Year
- List of All-Big East Conference men's basketball teams
