= 1988–89 St. John's Redmen basketball team =

American college basketball season

1988–89 St. John's Redmen men's basketball

NIT champions Lapchick Memorial Champions

NIT Championship, W 73–65 vs. Saint Louis
- Conference: Big East Conference (1979–2013)
- Record: 20–13 (6–10 Big East)
- Head coach: Lou Carnesecca
- Assistant coaches: Brian Mahoney; Al LoBalbo; Ron Rutledge
- Home arena: Alumni Hall; Madison Square Garden

1988–89 Big East men's basketball standings
	Conf.				Overall
Team	W		L	PCT	W		L	PCT
No. 2 Georgetown †	13	–	3	.813	29	–	5	.853
No. 11 Seton Hall	11	–	5	.688	31	–	7	.816
No. 7 Syracuse	10	–	6	.625	30	–	8	.789
Pittsburgh	9	–	7	.563	17	–	13	.567
Villanova	7	–	9	.438	18	–	16	.529
Providence	7	–	9	.438	18	–	11	.621
Connecticut	6	–	10	.375	18	–	13	.581
St. John's	6	–	10	.375	20	–	13	.606
Boston College	3	–	13	.188	12	–	17	.414
† 1989 Big East tournament winner As of April 3, 1989; Rankings from AP poll

The 1988–89 St. John's Redmen basketball team represented St. John's University during the 1988–89 NCAA Division I men's basketball season. The team was coached by Lou Carnesecca in his twenty first year at the school. St. John's home games are played at Alumni Hall and Madison Square Garden and the team is a member of the Big East Conference.

== Off season ==
=== Departures ===
Name	Number	Pos.	Height	Weight	Year	Hometown	Notes
Marcus Broadnax	5	G	6'2"		Sophomore		Transferred to UAB
Terry Bross	10	C	6'9"		Senior		Graduated. Entered 1987 MLB draft
Marco Baldi	14	C	6'11"		Junior		Entered Italian basketball league
Elander Lewis	22	G	6'4"		Sophomore		Transferred. VCU
Shelton Jones	31	F	6'9"		Senior		Graduated. Entered 1988 NBA draft
Steve Shurina	40	G	6'4"		Senior		Graduated
Michael Porter		G	6'0"		Junior		Entered CBA

=== Class of 1988 signees ===
College recruiting information
Name	Hometown	School	Height	Weight	Commit date
Malik Sealy; SF	Bronx, NY	St. Nicholas of Tolentine High School	6 ft 8 in (2.03 m)	N/A	
Malik Sealy; SF	Recruit ratings: No ratings found				
Robert Werdann; C	Sunnyside, NY	Archbishop Molloy High School	6 ft 11 in (2.11 m)	N/A	
Robert Werdann; C	Recruit ratings: No ratings found				
Jason Buchanan; PG	Syracuse, NY	Nottingham High School	6 ft 2 in (1.88 m)	N/A	
Jason Buchanan; PG	Recruit ratings: No ratings found				
Chucky Sproling; SG	Denver, CO	Manual High School	6 ft 4 in (1.93 m)	N/A	
Chucky Sproling; SG	Recruit ratings: No ratings found				
Terence Mullin; SG	Brooklyn, NY	Xaverian High School	6 ft 0 in (1.83 m)	N/A	
Terence Mullin; SG	Recruit ratings: No ratings found				
Overall recruit ranking:
Note: In many cases, Scout, Rivals, 247Sports, On3, and ESPN may conflict in their listings of height and weight.; In these cases, the average was taken. ESPN grades are on a 100-point scale.; Sources: "1988 Team Ranking". Rivals.

=== Incoming transfers ===
Name	Number	Pos.	Height	Weight	Year	Hometown	Notes
Darrell Aiken	5	SG	6'0"		Junior		Transferred from Westchester Community College.
Barry Milhaven	13	SF	6'5"		Junior		Transferred from Nassau Community College.

== Roster ==
1988–89 St. John's Red Storm men's basketball team
Players
Coaches

Pos.	#	Name	Height	Weight	Year	Previous school	Hometown
G	3	Boo Harvey (I)	5 ft 11 in (1.8 m)	—	Sr	Andrew Jackson/San Jacinto	St. Albans, NY
G	5	Darrell Aiken	6 ft 0 in (1.83 m)	—	Jr	John F. Kennedy/Westchester	New York, NY
G	10	Terence Mullin	6 ft 0 in (1.83 m)	—	Fr	Xaverian	Brooklyn, NY
F/C	11	Jayson Williams	6 ft 10 in (2.08 m)	—	Jr	Christ the King	New York, NY
G	12	Jason Buchanan	6 ft 0 in (1.83 m)	—	Fr	Nottingham	Syracuse, NY
F	13	Barry Milhaven	6 ft 5 in (1.96 m)	—	Jr	Schreiber/Nassau	Port Washington, NY
G	15	Kevin Fitzpatrick (C)	6 ft 1 in (1.85 m)	—	Sr	St. Francis Prep	Jackson Heights, NY
F	21	Malik Sealy	6 ft 8 in (2.03 m)	—	Fr	St. Nicholas of Tolentine	Bronx, NY
G/F	22	Chucky Sproling (I)	6 ft 4 in (1.93 m)	—	Fr	Manual	Denver, CO
G/F	23	Matt Brust (C)	6 ft 4 in (1.93 m)	—	RS Sr	Babylon/North Carolina	Babylon, NY
G	24	Chris Pursoo (W)	6 ft 0 in (1.83 m)	—	Fr	Long Island Lutheran	Westbury, NY
F	33	Billy Singleton	6 ft 6 in (1.98 m)	—	So	Adlai E. Stevenson	Bronx, NY
C	41	Robert Werdann	6 ft 11 in (2.11 m)	—	Fr	Archbishop Molloy	Sunnyside, NY
C	50	Sean Muto	6 ft 11 in (2.11 m)	—	So	Mechanicsburg	Mechanicsburg, PA

Head coach

- Lou Carnesecca (St. John's, '50)

Assistant coach(es)

- Brian Mahoney
- Al LoBalbo
- Ron Rutledge

Legend

- (C) Team captain
- (S) Suspended
- (I) Ineligible
- (W) Walk-on
- Injured
- Current redshirt

== Schedule and results ==
Date time, TV	Rank^{#}	Opponent^{#}	Result	Record	Site city, state
Regular season
11/25/88*		Long Island University; Lapchick Tournament Opening Round	W 71-55	1-0	Alumni Hall; Queens, NY
11/26/88*		Brigham Young; Lapchick Tournament Championship	W 83-77	2-0	Alumni Hall; Queens, NY
11/30/88*		Fairleigh Dickinson	W 86-55	3-0	Alumni Hall; Queens, NY
12/03/88*		Hawaii	W 65-60	4-0	Alumni Hall; Queens, NY
12/07/88*		Fordham	W 67-47	5-0	Alumni Hall; Queens, NY
12/10/88		No. 20 Seton Hall	L 63-74	5-1 (0-1)	Alumni Hall; Queens, NY
12/17/88*		at Manhattan	W 71-54	6-1	Draddy Gymnasium; Bronx, NY
12/23/88*		at Niagara	L 63-68	6-2	Gallagher Center; Lewiston, NY
12/27/88*		Fordham; ECAC Holiday Festival Opening Round	W 84-59	7-2	Madison Square Garden; New York, NY
12/29/88*		No. 15 Ohio State; ECAC Holiday Festival Championship	L 72-77	7-3	Madison Square Garden; New York, NY
01/03/89		at Providence	L 69-98	7-4 (0-2)	Providence Civic Center; Providence, RI
01/07/89		Villanova	W 81-62	8-4 (1-2)	Alumni Hall; Queens, NY
01/10/89		Connecticut	W 71-63	9-4 (2-2)	Alumni Hall; Queens, NY
01/14/89		No. 4 Syracuse	W 65-63	10-4 (3-2)	Madison Square Garden; New York, NY
01/18/89*		vs. Rutgers	W 62-61	11-4	Meadowlands Arena; East Rutherford, NJ
01/21/89		at Boston College	W 74-66	12-4 (4-2)	Silvio O. Conte Forum; Chestnut Hill, MA
01/23/89		at No. 3 Georgetown	L 64-75	12-5 (4-3)	Capital Centre; Landover, MD
01/28/89		at Connecticut	L 52-80	12-6 (4-4)	Hartford Civic Center; Hartford, CT
01/30/89		Pittsburgh	L 81-85 ^{OT}	12-7 (4-5)	Alumni Hall; Queens, NY
02/01/89		Providence	W 87-73	13-7 (5-5)	Alumni Hall; Queens, NY
02/11/89		at No. 9 Syracuse	L 69-92	13-8 (5-6)	Carrier Dome; Syracuse, NY
02/14/89		at Pittsburgh	L 77-87	13-9 (5-7)	Fitzgerald Field House; Pittsburgh, PA
02/18/89		at DePaul	W 67-64	14-9	Rosemont Horizon; Rosemont, IL
02/21/89		at No. 15 Seton Hall	L 60-63	14-10 (5-8)	Meadowlands Arena; East Rutherford, NJ
02/25/89		No. 3 Georgetown	L 55-63	14-11 (5-9)	Madison Square Garden; New York, NY
02/27/89		Boston College	W 62-59 ^{OT}	15-11 (6-9)	Alumni Hall; Queens, NY
03/04/89		at Villanova	L 60-74	15-12 (6-10)	du Pont Pavilion; Villanova, PA
Big East tournament
03/09/89		vs. Boston College; Big East tournament first round	L 74-81	15-13	Madison Square Garden; New York, NY
NIT
03/15/89		Mississippi; NIT First Round	W 70-67	16-13	Alumni Hall; Queens, NY
03/21/89		Oklahoma State; NIT Second Round	W 76-64	17-13	Alumni Hall; Queens, NY
03/23/89		at Ohio State; NIT Quarterfinal	W 83-80 ^{OT}	18-13	St. John Arena; Columbus, OH
03/27/89		vs. Alabama-Birmingham; NIT Semifinal	W 76-65	19-13	Madison Square Garden; New York, NY
03/29/89		vs. St. Louis; NIT Championship	W 73-65	20-13	Madison Square Garden; New York, NY
*Non-conference game. ^{#}Rankings from AP Poll. (#) Tournament seedings in parentheses.
