= 1988–89 Syracuse Orangemen basketball team =

American college basketball season

1988–89 Syracuse Orangemen basketball

Preseason NIT champions

NCAA tournament, Elite Eight
- Conference: Big East Conference

Ranking
- Coaches: No. 9
- AP: No. 7
- Record: 30–8 (10–6 Big East)
- Head coach: Jim Boeheim (13th season)
- Assistant coaches: Bernie Fine (13th season); Wayne Morgan (5th season)
- Home arena: Carrier Dome

1988–89 Big East men's basketball standings
	Conf.				Overall
Team	W		L	PCT	W		L	PCT
No. 2 Georgetown †	13	–	3	.813	29	–	5	.853
No. 11 Seton Hall	11	–	5	.688	31	–	7	.816
No. 7 Syracuse	10	–	6	.625	30	–	8	.789
Pittsburgh	9	–	7	.563	17	–	13	.567
Villanova	7	–	9	.438	18	–	16	.529
Providence	7	–	9	.438	18	–	11	.621
Connecticut	6	–	10	.375	18	–	13	.581
St. John's	6	–	10	.375	20	–	13	.606
Boston College	3	–	13	.188	12	–	17	.414
† 1989 Big East tournament winner As of April 3, 1989; Rankings from AP poll

The 1988–89 Syracuse Orangemen basketball team represented Syracuse University in the 1988–89 NCAA Division I men's basketball season. The head coach was Jim Boeheim, serving for his 13th year. The team played home games at the Carrier Dome in Syracuse, New York. The team finished with a 30–8 (10–6) record while making it to the Midwest Regional Final of the NCAA tournament.

The team was led by senior Sherman Douglas and junior Derrick Coleman.

== Roster ==
1988–89 Syracuse Orange men's basketball team
Players
Coaches

Pos.	#	Name	Height	Weight	Year	Hometown
SF	4	Dave Johnson	6 ft 7 in (2.01 m)	200 lb (91 kg)	Fr	Morgan City, Louisiana
G	20	Sherman Douglas	6 ft 0 in (1.83 m)	170 lb (77 kg)	Sr	Washington, D.C.
G	21	Matt Roe	6 ft 5 in (1.96 m)	175 lb (79 kg)	Jr	Manlius, New York
SF	30	Billy Owens	6 ft 8 in (2.03 m)	205 lb (93 kg)	Fr	Carlisle, Pennsylvania
G	32	Stephen Thompson	6 ft 4 in (1.93 m)	175 lb (79 kg)	Jr	Los Angeles, California
F	33	Herman Harried	6 ft 7 in (2.01 m)	210 lb (95 kg)	Sr	Baltimore, Maryland
C	34	Rich Manning	6 ft 11 in (2.11 m)	240 lb (109 kg)	Fr	Tacoma, Washington
C	41	Erik Rogers	6 ft 10 in (2.08 m)	205 lb (93 kg)	Jr	Temple City, California
F	44	Derrick Coleman	6 ft 9 in (2.06 m)	215 lb (98 kg)	Jr	Detroit, Michigan

Head coach

- Jim Boeheim (Syracuse)

Assistant coach(es)

- Bernie Fine (Syracuse)
- Wayne Morgan (St. Lawrence)

Legend

- (C) Team captain
- (S) Suspended
- (I) Ineligible
- (W) Walk-on
- Injured
- Current redshirt

Roster
Last update: 2019-Jan-25

== Schedule and results ==
Date time, TV	Rank^{#}	Opponent^{#}	Result	Record	Site city, state
Nov 18, 1988*	No. 8	La Salle	W 92–76	1–0	Carrier Dome; Syracuse, NY
Nov 19, 1988*	No. 8	Wyoming	W 107–81	2–0	Carrier Dome; Syracuse, NY
Nov 23, 1988*	No. 6	vs. No. 20 Indiana; Preseason NIT Semifinals	W 102–78	3–0	Madison Square Garden; New York, NY
Nov 25, 1988*	No. 6	vs. No. 14 Missouri; Preseason NIT Championship	W 86–84 ^{OT}	4–0	Madison Square Garden; New York, NY
Nov 28, 1988*	No. 6	Cornell	W 91–66	5–0	Carrier Dome; Syracuse, NY
Dec 2, 1988*	No. 4	East Tennessee State; Carrier Classic	W 120–81	6–0	Carrier Dome; Syracuse, NY
Dec 3, 1988*	No. 4	Louisiana Tech; Carrier Classic	W 106–98 ^{OT}	7–0	Carrier Dome; Syracuse, NY
Dec 10, 1988*	No. 3	Kentucky State	W 108–73	8–0	Carrier Dome; Syracuse, NY
Dec 14, 1988*	No. 3	U.S. International	W 135–93	9–0	Carrier Dome; Syracuse, NY
Dec 17, 1988*	No. 3	Canisius	W 95–69	10–0	Carrier Dome; Syracuse, NY
Dec 21, 1988*	No. 3	Western Michigan	W 94–71	11–0	Carrier Dome; Syracuse, NY
Dec 27, 1988*	No. 3	at Rutgers	W 100–81	12–0	Louis Brown Athletic Center; Piscataway, NJ
Dec 30, 1988*	No. 3	Saint Francis (PA)	W 105–63	13–0	Carrier Dome; Syracuse, NY
Jan 4, 1989	No. 2	Pittsburgh	L 76–81	13–1 (0–1)	Carrier Dome; Syracuse, NY
Jan 7, 1989	No. 2	No. 10 Seton Hall	W 90–66	14–1 (1–1)	Carrier Dome; Syracuse, NY
Jan 9, 1989	No. 2	at Villanova	L 73–75	14–2 (1–2)	The Pavilion; Villanova, PA
Jan 14, 1989	No. 4	at St. John's	L 63–65	14–3 (1–3)	Madison Square Garden; New York, NY
Jan 16, 1989	No. 4	at Connecticut; Rivalry	L 62–68	14–4 (1–4)	Hartford Civic Center; Hartford, CT
Jan 21, 1989*	No. 11	at Notre Dame	W 99–87	15–4	Edmund P. Joyce Center; Notre Dame, IN
Jan 24, 1989	No. 14	Boston College	W 72–60	16–4 (2–4)	Carrier Dome; Syracuse, NY
Jan 28, 1989	No. 14	No. 20 Providence	W 100–96	17–4 (3–4)	Carrier Dome; Syracuse, NY
Feb 1, 1989	No. 14	Villanova	W 90–57	18–4 (4–4)	Carrier Dome; Syracuse, NY
Feb 4, 1989	No. 14	Pittsburgh	W 103–80	19–4 (5–4)	Carrier Dome; Syracuse, NY
Feb 6, 1989	No. 14	at No. 10 Seton Hall	W 85–79	20–4 (6–4)	Brendan Byrne Arena; East Rutherford, NJ
Feb 11, 1989	No. 9	St. John's	W 92–69	21–4 (7–4)	Carrier Dome; Syracuse, NY
Feb 13, 1989	No. 9	at No. 2 Georgetown; Rivalry	L 54–61	21–5 (7–5)	Capital Centre (19,035); Landover, MD
Feb 18, 1989	No. 6	at Providence	W 87–80	22–5 (8–5)	Dunkin' Donuts Center; Providence, RI
Feb 26, 1989*	No. 6	Kentucky	W 89–73	23–5	Carrier Dome; Syracuse, NY
Feb 28, 1989	No. 6	Connecticut; Rivalry	W 88–72	24–5 (9–5)	Carrier Dome; Syracuse, NY
Mar 2, 1989	No. 6	at Boston College	L 87–90	24–6 (9–6)	Silvio O. Conte Forum; Boston, MA
Mar 5, 1989	No. 6	No. 2 Georgetown; Rivalry	W 82–76 ^{OT}	25–6 (10–6)	Carrier Dome (32,683); Syracuse, NY
Big East tournament
Mar 10, 1989	No. 5	vs. Providence; Big East tournament quarterfinal	W 79–76	26–6	Madison Square Garden; New York, NY
Mar 11, 1989	No. 5	vs. No. 11 Seton Hall; Big East tournament semifinal	W 81–78	27–6	Madison Square Garden; New York, NY
Mar 12, 1989	No. 5	vs. No. 3 Georgetown; Big East Championship/Rivalry	L 79–88	27–7	Madison Square Garden (19,591); New York, NY
NCAA tournament
Mar 17, 1989*	(2 MW) No. 7	vs. (15 MW) Bucknell	W 104–81	28–7	Reunion Arena; Dallas, TX
Mar 19, 1989	(2 MW) No. 7	vs. (10 MW) Colorado State	W 65–50	29–7	Reunion Arena; Dallas, TX
Mar 24, 1989*	(2 MW) No. 7	vs. (3 MW) No. 6 Missouri; Midwest Regional semifinal	W 83–80	30–7	Hubert H. Humphrey Metrodome; Minneapolis, MN
Mar 26, 1989*	(2 MW) No. 7	vs. (1 MW) No. 3 Illinois; Midwest Regional Final	L 86–89	30–8	Hubert H. Humphrey Metrodome; Minneapolis, MN
*Non-conference game. ^{#}Rankings from AP. (#) Tournament seedings in parentheses. MW=Midwest. All times are in EST.

== Rankings ==
Ranking movements Legend: ██ Increase in ranking ██ Decrease in ranking — = Not ranked
	Week																	
Poll	Pre	1	2	3	4	5	6	7	8	9	10	11	12	13	14	15	16	Final
AP	8	6	4	3	3	3	3	2	4	11	14	14	9	6	6	6	5	7
Coaches	8	—	3	3	3	3	3	2	4	11	13	14	10	5	5	6	4	9

^Coaches did not release a Week 1 poll.
*AP does not release post-NCAA Tournament rankings

== 1989 NBA draft ==
Round	Pick	Player	NBA club
2	28	Sherman Douglas	Miami Heat
