= 1988–89 Connecticut Huskies men's basketball team =

American college basketball season

1988–89 Connecticut Huskies men's basketball

NIT, Quarterfinals
- Conference: Big East Conference
- Record: 18–13 (6–10 Big East)
- Head coach: Jim Calhoun (3rd season)
- Assistant coaches: Howie Dickenman; Dave Leitao; Glen Miller; Ted Woodward
- Home arena: Hugh S. Greer Field House; Hartford Civic Center

1988–89 Big East men's basketball standings
	Conf.				Overall
Team	W		L	PCT	W		L	PCT
No. 2 Georgetown †	13	–	3	.813	29	–	5	.853
No. 11 Seton Hall	11	–	5	.688	31	–	7	.816
No. 7 Syracuse	10	–	6	.625	30	–	8	.789
Pittsburgh	9	–	7	.563	17	–	13	.567
Villanova	7	–	9	.438	18	–	16	.529
Providence	7	–	9	.438	18	–	11	.621
Connecticut	6	–	10	.375	18	–	13	.581
St. John's	6	–	10	.375	20	–	13	.606
Boston College	3	–	13	.188	12	–	17	.414
† 1989 Big East tournament winner As of April 3, 1989; Rankings from AP poll

The 1988–89 Connecticut Huskies men's basketball team represented the University of Connecticut in the 1988–89 collegiate men's basketball season. The Huskies completed the season with an 18–13 overall record. They were members of the Big East Conference where they finished with a 6–10 record. Connecticut made it to the quarterfinals in the 1989 National Invitation Tournament before losing to UAB 85–79. The Huskies played their home games at Hugh S. Greer Field House in Storrs, Connecticut and the Hartford Civic Center in Hartford, Connecticut, and they were led by third-year head coach Jim Calhoun.

== Schedule ==
Date time, TV	Rank^{#}	Opponent^{#}	Result	Record	Site (attendance) city, state
Regular Season
11/26/1988*		Hartford	W 67–55	1–0	Hartford Civic Center (15,354); Hartford, Connecticut
11/30/1988*; WTNH		at Yale	W 75–44	2–0	Payne Whitney Gymnasium (3,100); New Haven, Connecticut
12/5/1988*		Marist	W 93–71	3–0	Hugh S. Greer Field House (4,604); Storrs, Connecticut
12/8/1988*; ESPN	No. 18	at Purdue	L 73–88	3–1	Mackey Arena (14,123); West Lafayette, Indiana
12/10/1988*	No. 18	at Virginia	W 68–61	4–1	University Hall (8,864); Charlottesville, Virginia
12/13/1988*		Fairfield	W 71–48	5–1	Hugh S. Greer Field House (4,604); Storrs, Connecticut
12/23/1988*		Pepperdine	W 76–70	6–1	Hartford Civic Center (12,217); Hartford, Connecticut
12/28/1988*		Harvard; Connecticut Mutual Classic	W 84–43	7–1	Hartford Civic Center (12,217); Hartford, Connecticut
12/29/1988*		Air Force; Connecticut Mutual Classic	W 68–55	8–1	Hartford Civic Center (13,255); Hartford, Connecticut
1/4/1989; NESN		Villanova	W 57–55	9–1 (1–0)	Hartford Civic Center (16,016); Hartford, Connecticut
1/7/1989; NESN		No. 20 Providence	L 78–80	9–2 (1–1)	Hartford Civic Center (16,016); Hartford, Connecticut
1/10/1989; WTNH		at St. John's	L 63–71	9–3 (1–2)	Carnesecca Arena (16,008); New York City
1/14/1989; WTNH		at No. 13 Seton Hall	L 62–76	9–4 (1–3)	Brendan Byrne Arena (11,782); East Rutherford, New Jersey
1/16/1989; ESPN		No. 11 Syracuse; Rivalry	W 68–62	10–4 (2–3)	Hartford Civic Center (16,016); Hartford, Connecticut
1/21/1989; WTNH		at No. 3 Georgetown; Rivalry	L 55–59	10–5 (2–4)	Capital Centre (12,531); Landover, Maryland
1/28/1989; NESN		St. John's	W 80–52	11–5 (3–4)	Hartford Civic Center (16,016); Hartford, Connecticut
1/30/1989*		Massachusetts	W 104–75	12–5	Hugh S. Greer Field House (4,604); Storrs, Connecticut
2/4/1989; WTNH		at Providence	L 61–65	12–6 (3–5)	Providence Civic Center (13,168); Providence, Rhode Island
2/8/1989; ESPN		No. 2 Georgetown; Rivalry	L 58–70	12–7 (3–6)	Hartford Civic Center (16,016); Hartford, Connecticut
2/11/1989; NESN		Boston College	W 86–49	13–7 (4–6)	Hartford Civic Center (16,016); Hartford, Connecticut
2/15/1989; ESPN		No. 12 Seton Hall	L 69–72	13–8 (4–7)	Hartford Civic Center (15,122); Hartford, Connecticut
2/18/1989; WTNH		at Villanova	L 67–76 ^{OT}	13–9 (4–8)	The Pavilion (6,500); Villanova, Pennsylvania
2/22/1989; ESPN		at Boston College	W 77–75	14–9 (5–8)	Conte Forum (6,814); Boston
2/25/1989; NESN		Pittsburgh	W 64–62	15–9 (6–8)	Hartford Civic Center (15,814); Hartford, Connecticut
2/28/1989; WTNH		at No. 6 Syracuse; Rivalry	L 72–88	15–10 (6–9)	Carrier Dome (29,124); Syracuse, New York
3/4/1989; WTNH		at Pittsburgh	L 80–88	15–11 (6–10)	Civic Arena (6,798); Pittsburgh, Pennsylvania
3/6/1989*		Central Connecticut	W 94–55	16–11	Hugh S. Greer Field House (4,604); Storrs, Connecticut
Big East tournament
3/10/1989; WTNH		vs. No. 11 Seton Hall; Quarterfinals	L 66–74	16–12	Madison Square Garden (19,591); New York
NIT
3/15/1989*		at Charlotte; First Round	W 67–62	17–12	Charlotte Coliseum (6,686); Charlotte, North Carolina
3/20/1989*		California; Second Round	W 73–72	18–12	Hartford Civic Center (12,031); Hartford, Connecticut
3/22/1989*		UAB; Quarterfinals	L 79–85	18–13	Hugh S. Greer Field House (4,604); Storrs, Connecticut
*Non-conference game. ^{#}Rankings from AP Poll. (#) Tournament seedings in parentheses. All times are in Eastern Time.

Schedule Source:
