= Nick Werkman =

American basketball player

Personal information
- Born: Trenton, New Jersey, U.S.
- Listed height: 6 ft 3 in (1.91 m)

Career information
- High school: Trenton Catholic (Trenton, New Jersey)
- College: Seton Hall (1961–1964)
- NBA draft: 1964: 5th round, 43rd overall pick
- Drafted by: Boston Celtics
- Position: Forward

Career history

Coaching
- 1972–1978: Stockton

Career highlights
- Second-team All-American – NABC (1963); Third-team All-American – AP, UPI (1963); NCAA scoring champion (1963); Haggerty Award (1964); No. 44 retired by Seton Hall Pirates
- Stats at Basketball Reference

Nicholas G. Werkman III is an American former basketball player for the Seton Hall Pirates of South Orange, New Jersey, who led the NCAA in scoring in 1962–63 and was in the top three nationally on his two other collegiate seasons.

Born in Trenton, New Jersey, Werkman played for the basketball team that won 100 consecutive games for Immaculate Conception Grammar School. Werkman earned varsity letters in both baseball and basketball all four years he attended Trenton Catholic High School, where he graduated in 1960. The basketball team won the Parochial A state championship all four years in high school.

In just three seasons of collegiate basketball (the NCAA did not allow freshman to play varsity ball at the time) Werkman compiled 2,273 points and 1,036 rebounds. Among the nation's top scorers in each of his three seasons, Werkman averaged 32 points per game in 1962 (third nationally), 29.5 in 1963 (top scorer), and 33.2 in 1964 (second nationally). His career 32.0 points per game average is ninth all-time in NCAA Division I history. He was inducted into Seton Hall's Athletics Hall of Fame in 1972.

After Werkman's senior campaign ended, he was drafted by the Boston Celtics in the 5th round as the 43rd overall selection in the 1964 NBA draft. Werkman never played in the NBA.

Werkman played for Trenton Colonials for nine seasons in the Eastern Professional Basketball League. In the 1972–73 school year, he became the coach of both the baseball and basketball teams at Stockton State College.

== See also ==
- List of NCAA Division I men's basketball players with 2,000 points and 1,000 rebounds
