= 1988–89 Georgetown Hoyas men's basketball team =

American college basketball season

1988–89 Georgetown Hoyas men's basketball

Big East regular season champions Big East tournament champions

NCAA tournament, Regional Runner-Up
- Conference: Big East Conference

Ranking
- Coaches: No. 2
- AP: No. 2
- Record: 29–5 (13–3 Big East)
- Head coach: John Thompson (17th season)
- Assistant coaches: Craig Esherick (7th season); Mike Riley (7th season)
- Captain: Charles Smith
- Home arena: Capital Centre

1988–89 Big East men's basketball standings
	Conf.				Overall
Team	W		L	PCT	W		L	PCT
No. 2 Georgetown †	13	–	3	.813	29	–	5	.853
No. 11 Seton Hall	11	–	5	.688	31	–	7	.816
No. 7 Syracuse	10	–	6	.625	30	–	8	.789
Pittsburgh	9	–	7	.563	17	–	13	.567
Villanova	7	–	9	.438	18	–	16	.529
Providence	7	–	9	.438	18	–	11	.621
Connecticut	6	–	10	.375	18	–	13	.581
St. John's	6	–	10	.375	20	–	13	.606
Boston College	3	–	13	.188	12	–	17	.414
† 1989 Big East tournament winner As of April 3, 1989; Rankings from AP poll

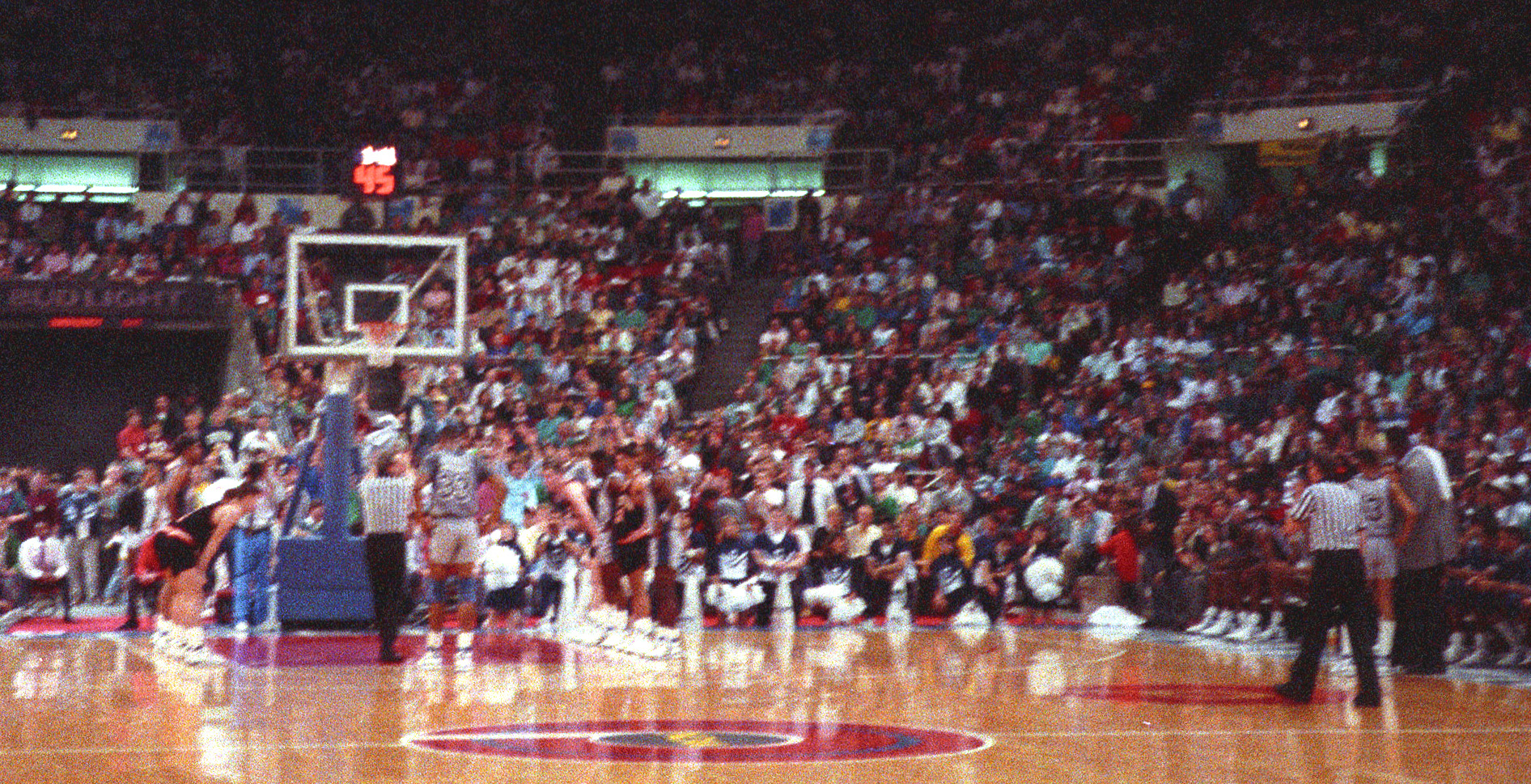
Georgetown faced Princeton in an opening round game of the 1989 NCAA tournament on March 17, 1989, at the Providence Civic Center in Providence, Rhode Island. Above, with 1:41 left in the game, Georgetown freshman center Alonzo Mourning is at the free throw line, while on the sideline head coach John Thompson, talks to senior guard Charles Smith. Georgetown won the game 50–49.

The 1988–89 Georgetown Hoyas men's basketball team represented Georgetown University in the 1988–89 NCAA Division I college basketball season. John Thompson, coached them in his 17th season as head coach. They played their home games at the Capital Centre in Landover, Maryland. They were members of the Big East Conference and finished the season with a record of 29–5, 13–3 in Big East play. They finished as the Big East regular season champions and won the 1989 Big East men's basketball tournament, the sixth Big East tournament championship in Georgetown men's basketball history, defeating Syracuse in the final game. They were the No. 1 seed in the East Region of the 1989 NCAA Division I men's basketball tournament – the 11th of 14 consecutive Georgetown NCAA tournament appearances – and advanced to the East Region final before losing to the region's No. 2 seed, Duke. They were ranked No. 2 in the season's final Associated Press Poll and Coaches' Poll.

== Player summaries ==
Since Patrick Ewing's graduation in May 1985, Georgetown had struggled to find a suitable replacement at center; sophomore Grady Mateen had been ineffective at the position in the 1985–86 season and had transferred to Ohio State after that year, while his successor Ben Gillery, who played in 1986–87 and 1987–88, had lacked offensive skill and seen only limited playing time. However, two talented centers joined the team this season. Freshman Alonzo Mourning, viewed nationally as "the next Patrick Ewing," arrived, and great things were expected of him and, because of him, for Georgetown men's basketball as a whole. Unheralded sophomore Dikembe Mutombo, a native of Zaire, in contrast, had spent his freshman year playing only intramural basketball in order to settle into life in the United States and focus on his academic studies and English language skills. Without any press attention, he was a virtual unknown outside of the Georgetown campus during his freshman year, and arrived on the varsity team for his sophomore season as a surprise to sportswriters and opposing teams. Mourning and Mutombo were among five future National Basketball Association (NBA) players on the 1988–89 squad.

Unaccustomed to American collegiate basketball, Mutombo appeared in 33 of the team's 34 games but started none of them and saw only limited playing time, averaging 11 minutes per game while he became acclimated to the college game in the United States. Although he averaged only 3.9 points and 3.3 rebounds per game for the season, these figures belied the scoring and defensive prowess he displayed on the court. Opponents found his close-range shots virtually impossible to stop, and he broke a 22-year-old school record with a 70.7% shooting average from the field; he scored in 23 games, and shot 100% from the field in ten of them. On defense, he showed himself to be a skilled shot blocker; never taught in Zaire to jump in anticipation of an opponent's shot, he simply stood his ground and waited for the opponent to commit to a shot before rising to swat it away. He blocked 75 shots during the season, and set a National Collegiate Athletic Association (NCAA) record with 12 shots blocked in a single game against St. John's. Despite his prowess, Mutumbo served solely as Mourning's backup; it would take an additional year before Thompson realized that Mourning and Mutumbo should be playing in the starting lineup at the same time.

Mourning, meanwhile, started all 34 games, averaging 29 minutes per game, and became a consistent scoring threat. Although he averaged only eight shots per game and led the team in scoring only six times, he averaged 13.2 points (along with 7.3 rebounds) per game. In his third game, playing against Saint Leo, he unofficially had the first triple double in Georgetown history. In his first ten games, he averaged 5.7 blocked shots per game, and in his eleventh, against Miami on January 7, 1989, he had 26 points, 17 rebounds, and six blocks. By the end of the season, he had blocked an NCAA-record 169 shots.

Senior guard Charles Smith closed out his college career with his best season. The Hoyas' top scorer for the year, he scored a combined 117 points at the Capital Centre in Georgetown's first five home games of the year. Two of his top offensive performances of the regular season came in Georgetown's most exciting games of the year. With Thompson sitting out the game to protest NCAA Proposition 42 and Georgetown falling 14 points behind in the second half, Smith scored 35 points at Providence to lead the Hoyas to a comeback 80–77 victory, including the winning basket with five seconds left in the game. At Louisiana State ten days later before the largest crowd in NCAA history and with a possible No. 1 ranking on the line for the second-ranked Hoyas after Arizona's loss earlier in the week, he scored 32 points as the Hoyas came back from 10 points behind to take a four-point lead with 2:08 left in the game; unfortunately for the Hoyas, the Tigers tied the game and, after they put up a shot with five seconds left that missed, LSU forward Ricky Blanton tipped the ball in to give the Tigers an 82–80 victory. Fifteen days after that, Smith scored 22 at Pittsburgh. He would finish the year averaging 18.7 points per game.

Senior guard Jaren Jackson had emerged as a top scorer in the last few games of the previous season after almost three years as a reserve, and he won a starting position this season, starting all 34 games. After averaging 16 points per game during the non-conference games of November and December 1988, he opened the Big East regular season with a 27-point performance against 10th-ranked Seton Hall. At Louisiana State he had a season-high 28 points, and he scored in double figures 20 times. He averaged 12.3 points per game for the year.

After a difficult sophomore year in which he had been demoted to the bench, junior guard Dwayne Bryant became a starter again this season. He played in all 34 games and started 32 of them, shooting 50% from the field overall and 43% from three-point range. He led the Hoyas in scoring in two big regular-season Big East games against Boston College and St. John's.

Junior guard Mark Tillmon slumped during the season, averaging only four points per game through early January 1989 and losing his starting job to Jackson; he appeared in 32 games but started only three of them. After Big East play began, however, he became one of Georgetown's top scorers off the bench, with 14 points in each of the Hoyas' two regular-season games against Boston College and 18 points in the season finale against archrival Syracuse. He ended the season averaging 8.3 points per game.

== Team season recap ==
The Hoyas finished in first place in the Big East's regular season, the second time in three seasons and fourth time in school history that they had finished in first or tied for first. They won the 1989 Big East tournament, defeating fifth-ranked Syracuse in the final for the sixth Big East tournament championship in Georgetown history. Charles Smith averaged 22 points per game over the Hoyas' three tournament games.

The Hoyas were the No. 1 seed in the East Region of the 1989 NCAA Division I men's basketball tournament – the 11th of 14 consecutive Georgetown NCAA tournament appearances. In their first round game against Ivy League champion Princeton, Smith shot only 2-for-12 from the field and the Hoyas barely escaped an upset. Princeton employed a 1950s-era offense and scored 14 of their 21 field goals off of layups off back-door screens, and, after Mourning blocked a last-second Princeton shot that some observers believed should have been called a personal foul against him, Georgetown barely eked out a 50–49 victory. In the second round, Smith scored 34 points to lead Georgetown to a win over Notre Dame, but he twisted his ankle, and the injury made him ineffective in the East Region semifinal against North Carolina State, in which he scored only a single point. Bryant scored a team-high 24 points and Jackson scored 17, however, and the Hoyas again emerged with a victory.

In the East Region final, Georgetown faced the region's No. 2 seed, Duke. Smith scored 21 points and Tillmon 16, but Jackson managed only 1-for-10 shooting from the field. The Blue Devils, led by Danny Ferry and freshman Christian Laettner built an early lead that they never relinquished, and they knocked the Hoyas out of the tournament, bringing Georgetown's season to an end, with the 85–77 loss. The Hoyas were ranked No. 2 in the season's final Associated Press Poll and Coaches' Poll behind only Arizona.

Although it was not apparent at the time, Duke's defeat of Georgetown signaled a change in the balance of power in men's college basketball. While Duke was on the rise entering the 1990s, the Hoyas' era of dominance was beginning to come to a close. Georgetown would not win the Big East tournament again until the 2007–08 team won in 2008, and before the 2007–08 team's Final Four appearance in the 2008 NCAA tournament, the Hoyas would make an Elite Eight appearance only once, when the 1995–96 team advanced to the East Region final of the 1996 NCAA tournament.

== Roster ==
Freshman guard Ronny Thompson was the son of head coach John Thompson, Jr.

#	Name	Height	Weight (lbs.)	Pos	Class	Hometown	Previous Team(s)
4	Bobby Winston	6'5"	N/A	G/F	Sr.	Washington, DC, U.S.	All Saints HS
11	Kayode Vann	6'1"	175	G	So.	New York, NY, U.S.	Berkeley Carroll School
12	Dwayne Bryant	6'2"	190	G	Jr.	New Orleans, LA, U.S.	De La Salle HS
13	Charles Smith	6'0"	160	G	Sr.	Washington, DC, U.S.	All Saints HS
20	Mark Tillmon	6'2"	190	G	Jr.	Washington, DC, U.S.	Gonzaga College HS
21	Jaren Jackson	6'2"	190	F	Sr.	New Orleans, LA, U.S.	Walter L. Cohen HS
22	Johnny Jones	6'6"	N/A	F	Sr.	Coral Springs, FL, U.S.	University of the District of Columbia
24	Anthony Allen	6'7"	N/A	F	Jr.	Port Arthur, TX, U.S.	Abraham Lincoln HS
30	Ronny Thompson	6'4"	190	G	Fr.	Washington, DC, U.S.	Flint Hill School (Oakton, VA)
33	Alonzo Mourning	6'10"	240	C	Fr.	Chesapeake, VA, U.S.	Indian River HS
40	Milton Bell	6'7"	N/A	F	Fr.	Richmond, VA, U.S.	John Marshall HS
42	Johnathan Edwards	6'8"	N/A	F	Sr.	New Orleans, LA, U.S.	O. Perry Walker HS
50	Sam Jefferson	7'2"	N/A	F	Jr.	Washington, DC, U.S.	Flint Hill School (Oakton, VA)
52	Robert Turner	6'8"	N/A	F	Jr.	Glenarden, MD, U.S.	CCAC (Pa.)
55	Dikembe Mutombo	7'2"	245	C	So.	Kinshasa, Zaire	Institut Boboto

== Rankings ==
Ranking movement Legend: ██ Improvement in ranking. ██ Decrease in ranking. ██ Not ranked the previous week. RV=Others receiving votes.
Poll	Pre	Wk 1	Wk 2	Wk 3	Wk 4	Wk 5	Wk 6	Wk 7	Wk 8	Wk 9	Wk 10	Wk 11	Wk 12	Wk 13	Wk 14	Wk 15	Wk 16	Final
AP	2	2	3	4	5	6	5	5	7	3	2	6	2	4	3	2	3	2
Coaches	4	– (Note: No Coaches' Poll this week.)	4	4	4	6	6	5	7	4	2	5	2	4	3	2	3	2

== 1988–89 Schedule and results ==
The 66,144 people who attended the game the Hoyas played against Louisiana State at the Louisiana Superdome in New Orleans, Louisiana, on January 28, 1989, set the record for the largest crowd ever to attend a game involving Georgetown.

- All times are Eastern

Date time, TV	Rank^{#}	Opponent^{#}	Result	Record	Site (attendance) city, state
Regular season
Fri., Nov. 25, 1988*	No. 2	at Hawaii Loa; Hawaii Loa Classic	W 105–59	1–0	Kaneohe Armory (503); Kaneohe, HI
Sat., Nov. 26, 1988*	No. 2	vs. Hawaii Pacific; Hawaii Loa Classic	W 95–55	2–0	Kaneohe Armory (812); Kaneohe, HI
Wed., Dec. 7, 1988*	No. 4	Saint Leo	W 95–62	3–0	Capital Centre (N/A); Landover, MD
Sat., Dec. 10, 1988*	No. 4	Shenandoah	W 114–40	4–0	Capital Centre (5,065); Landover, MD
Wed., Dec. 14, 1988*	No. 5	Oral Roberts	W 91–75	5–0	Capital Centre (6,488); Landover, MD
Sat., Dec. 17, 1988*	No. 4	DePaul	W 74–64	6–0	Capital Centre (N/A); Landover, MD
Tue., Dec. 20, 1988*	No. 6	Virginia Tech	W 87–57	7–0	Capital Centre (19,025); Landover, MD
Wed., Dec. 28, 1988*	No. 5	vs. Mercer; Miller Lite-Tampa Tribune Holiday Classic	W 80–55	8–0	USF Sun Dome (6,103); Tampa, FL
Thu., Dec. 29, 1988*	No. 5	at South Florida; Miller Lite-Tampa Tribune Holiday Classic	W 74–64	9–0	USF Sun Dome (9,138); Tampa, FL
Tue., Jan. 3, 1989	No. 5	at No. 10 Seton Hall	L 86–94	9–1 (0–1)	Brendan Byrne Arena (19,761); East Rutherford, NJ
Sat., Jan. 7, 1989*	No. 5	Miami	W 112–79	10–1	Capital Centre (11,113); Landover, MD
Wed., Jan. 11, 1989	No. 7	Pittsburgh	W 76–57	11–1 (1–1)	Capital Centre (13,878); Landover, MD
Sat., Jan. 14, 1989	No. 7	Boston College	W 86–60	12–1 (2–1)	Capital Centre (15,379); Landover, MD
Wed., Jan. 18, 1989	No. 3	at Providence	W 80–77	13–1 (3–1)	Providence Civic Center (13,203); Providence, RI
Sat., Jan. 21, 1989	No. 3	Connecticut; Rivalry	W 59–55	14–1 (4–1)	Capital Centre (12,531); Landover, MD
Mon., Jan. 23, 1989	No. 3	St. John's	W 75–64	15–1 (5–1)	Capital Centre (10,370); Landover, MD
Sat., Jan 28, 1989*	No. 2	at Louisiana State	L 80–82	15–2	Louisiana Superdome (66,144); New Orleans, LA
Wed., Feb. 1, 1989	No. 6	No. 10 Seton Hall	W 74–66	16–2 (6–1)	Capital Centre (14,185); Landover, MD
Sun., Feb. 5, 1989	No. 6	at Villanova	W 69–55	17–2 (7–1)	Spectrum (18,497); Philadelphia, PA
Wed., Feb. 7, 1989	No. 2	at Connecticut; Rivalry	W 70–58	18–2 (8–1)	Hartford Civic Center (16,016); Hartford, CT
Sat., Feb. 11, 1989	No. 2	at Pittsburgh	L 74–79	18–3 (8–2)	Civic Arena (16,669); Pittsburgh, PA
Mon., Feb. 13, 1989; 7:30 p.m.	No. 2	No. 9 Syracuse; Rivalry	W 61–54	19–3 (9–2)	Capital Centre (19,035); Landover, MD
Sat., Feb. 18, 1989	No. 4	at Boston College	W 80–69	20–3 (10–2)	Silvio O. Conte Forum (8,600); Chestnut Hill, MA
Wed., Feb. 22, 1989	No. 3	Providence	W 76–74	21–3 (11–2)	Capital Centre (11,883); Landover, MD
Sat., Feb 25, 1989	No. 3	at St. John's	W 63–55	22–3 (12–2)	Madison Square Garden (19,591); New York City
Mon., Feb. 27, 1989	No. 3	Villanova	W 76–62	23–3 (13–2)	Capital Centre (19,035); Landover, MD
Sun., Mar. 5, 1989; 12:00 noon	No. 2	at No. 6 Syracuse; Rivalry	L 76–82 ^{OT}	23–4 (13–3)	Carrier Dome (32,683); Syracuse, NY
Big East tournament
Fri., Mar. 10, 1989	(1) No. 3	vs. (9) Boston College; Quarterfinal	W 82–52	24–4	Madison Square Garden (19,591); New York, NY
Sat., Mar. 11, 1989	(1) No. 3	vs. (4) Pittsburgh; Semifinal	W 85–62	25–4	Madison Square Garden (19,591); New York, NY
Sun., Mar. 12, 1989; 2:30 p.m.	(1) No. 3	vs. (3) No. 5 Syracuse; Final/Rivalry	W 88–79	26–4	Madison Square Garden (19,591); New York, NY
NCAA tournament
Fri., Mar. 17, 1989	(1 E) No. 2	vs. (16 E) Princeton; First Round	W 50–49	27–4	Providence Civic Center (12,106); Providence, RI
Sun., Mar. 19, 1989	(1 E) No. 2	vs. (9 E) Notre Dame; Second Round	W 81–74	28–4	Providence Civic Center (12,106); Providence, RI
Fri., Mar. 24, 1989	(1 E) No. 2	vs. (5 E) No. 19 North Carolina State; Sweet Sixteen	W 69–61	29–4	Brendan Byrne Arena (19,508); East Rutherford, NJ
Sun., Mar. 26, 1989	(1 E) No. 2	vs. (2 E) No. 9 Duke; Elite Eight	L 77–85	29–5	Brendan Byrne Arena (N/A); East Rutherford, NJ
*Non-conference game. ^{#}Rankings from AP Poll. (#) Tournament seedings in parentheses.

== See also ==
- 1989 Georgetown vs. Princeton men's basketball game
