= 1988–89 Pittsburgh Panthers men's basketball team =

American college basketball season

1988–89 Pittsburgh Panthers men's basketball

NCAA tournament, first round, L 64–68 vs. Ball State
- Conference: Big East Conference (1979–2013)
- Record: 17–13 (9–7 Big East)
- Head coach: Paul Evans (3rd season)
- Assistant coaches: Norm Law (3rd season); Mark Coleman (3rd season); John Sarandrea (1st season)
- Home arena: Fitzgerald Field House (Capacity: 4,122)

1988–89 Big East men's basketball standings
	Conf.				Overall
Team	W		L	PCT	W		L	PCT
No. 2 Georgetown †	13	–	3	.813	29	–	5	.853
No. 11 Seton Hall	11	–	5	.688	31	–	7	.816
No. 7 Syracuse	10	–	6	.625	30	–	8	.789
Pittsburgh	9	–	7	.563	17	–	13	.567
Villanova	7	–	9	.438	18	–	16	.529
Providence	7	–	9	.438	18	–	11	.621
Connecticut	6	–	10	.375	18	–	13	.581
St. John's	6	–	10	.375	20	–	13	.606
Boston College	3	–	13	.188	12	–	17	.414
† 1989 Big East tournament winner As of April 3, 1989; Rankings from AP poll

The 1988–89 Pittsburgh Panthers men's basketball team represented the University of Pittsburgh in the 1988–89 NCAA Division I men's basketball season. Led by head coach Paul Evans, the Panthers finished with a record of 17–13. They received an at-large bid to the 1989 NCAA Division I men's basketball tournament where, as a #8 seed, they lost in the first round to Ball State.
