= 1988–89 Providence Friars men's basketball team =

American college basketball season

1988–89 Providence Friars men's basketball

NCAA tournament, First Round
- Conference: Big East Conference
- Record: 18–11 (7–9 Big East)
- Head coach: Rick Barnes (1st season)
- Home arena: Providence Civic Center

1988–89 Big East men's basketball standings
	Conf.				Overall
Team	W		L	PCT	W		L	PCT
No. 2 Georgetown †	13	–	3	.813	29	–	5	.853
No. 11 Seton Hall	11	–	5	.688	31	–	7	.816
No. 7 Syracuse	10	–	6	.625	30	–	8	.789
Pittsburgh	9	–	7	.563	17	–	13	.567
Villanova	7	–	9	.438	18	–	16	.529
Providence	7	–	9	.438	18	–	11	.621
Connecticut	6	–	10	.375	18	–	13	.581
St. John's	6	–	10	.375	20	–	13	.606
Boston College	3	–	13	.188	12	–	17	.414
† 1989 Big East tournament winner As of April 3, 1989; Rankings from AP poll

The 1988–89 Providence Friars men's basketball team represented the Providence College during the 1988–89 NCAA Division I men's basketball season. Led by first-year head coach Rick Barnes, the Friars finished the season 18–11 (7–9 Big East) and received an at-large bid to the NCAA tournament as the 11-seed in the Southeast region.

== Roster ==
1988–89 Providence Friars men's basketball team
Players
Coaches

Pos.	#	Name	Height	Weight	Year	Hometown
G	14	Eric Murdock	6 ft 1 in (1.85 m)	175 lb (79 kg)	So	Bridgewater Township, New Jersey
G	20	Carlton Screen	6 ft 0 in (1.83 m)	158 lb (72 kg)	Jr	Brooklyn, New York
F	24	Marques Bragg	6 ft 8 in (2.03 m)	220 lb (100 kg)	Fr	East Orange, New Jersey
F	25	Abdul Shamsid-Deen	6 ft 10 in (2.08 m)	209 lb (95 kg)	Jr	Staten Island, New York
C	30	Marty Conlon	6 ft 10 in (2.08 m)	209 lb (95 kg)	Jr	Bronxville, New York

Head coach

- Rick Barnes (Lenoir–Rhyne)

Assistant coach(es)

Legend

- (C) Team captain
- (S) Suspended
- (I) Ineligible
- (W) Walk-on
- Injured
- Current redshirt

== Schedule and results ==
Date time, TV	Rank^{#}	Opponent^{#}	Result	Record	Site city, state
Regular season
Nov 25, 1988*		Niagara	W 102–66	1–0	Providence Civic Center; Providence, Rhode Island
Nov 26, 1988*		South Alabama	W 93–88 ^{OT}	2–0	Providence Civic Center; Providence, Rhode Island
Nov 28, 1988*		at Brown	W 93–65	3–0	Marvel Gymnasium; Providence, Rhode Island
Dec 3, 1988*		Lafayette	W 75–46	4–0	Providence Civic Center; Providence, Rhode Island
Dec 5, 1988*		Yale	W 78–55	5–0	Providence Civic Center; Providence, Rhode Island
Dec 7, 1988		at Boston College	W 73–52	6–0 (1–0)	Silvio O. Conte Forum; Chestnut Hill, Massachusetts
Dec 10, 1988*		Rhode Island	W 76–70	7–0	Providence Civic Center; Providence, Rhode Island
Dec 22, 1988*		at Holy Cross	W 79–68	8–0	Hart Center; Worcester, Massachusetts
Dec 27, 1988*		Maine	W 100–78	9–0	Providence Civic Center; Providence, Rhode Island
Dec 29, 1988*		Wagner	W 93–57	10–0	Providence Civic Center; Providence, Rhode Island
Jan 3, 1989		St. John's	W 98–69	11–0 (2–0)	Providence Civic Center; Providence, Rhode Island
Jan 7, 1989; NESN	No. 20	at Connecticut	W 80–78	12–0 (3–0)	Hartford Civic Center (16,016); Storrs, Connecticut
Jan 11, 1989*	No. 20	Central Connecticut State	W 105–56	13–0	Providence Civic Center; Providence, Rhode Island
Jan 14, 1989	No. 20	Villanova	L 67–76	13–1 (3–1)	Providence Civic Center; Providence, Rhode Island
Jan 18, 1989		No. 3 Georgetown	L 77–80	13–2 (3–2)	Providence Civic Center; Providence, Rhode Island
Jan 21, 1989		at Pittsburgh	W 96–81	14–2 (4–2)	Fitzgerald Field House; Pittsburgh, Pennsylvania
Jan 24, 1989*	No. 20	at Miami (FL)	W 106–91	15–2	Miami Arena; Miami, Florida
Jan 28, 1989	No. 20	at No. 14 Syracuse	L 96–100	15–3 (4–3)	Carrier Dome; Syracuse, New York
Feb 1, 1989		at St. John's	L 73–87	15–4 (4–4)	Alumni Hall; Queens, New York
Feb 4, 1989; WTNH		Connecticut	W 65–61	16–4 (5–4)	Providence Civic Center (13,168); Providence, Rhode Island
Feb 7, 1989		Pittsburgh	W 88–78	17–4 (6–4)	Providence Civic Center; Providence, Rhode Island
Feb 14, 1989		at Villanova	L 83–86	17–5 (6–5)	The Pavilion; Villanova, Pennsylvania
Feb 18, 1989		No. 6 Syracuse	L 80–87	17–6 (6–6)	Providence Civic Center; Providence, Rhode Island
Feb 22, 1989		at No. 3 Georgetown	L 74–76	17–7 (6–7)	Capital Centre; Landover, Maryland
Feb 25, 1989		at No. 15 Seton Hall	L 80–84	17–8 (6–8)	Brendan Byrne Arena; East Rutherford, New Jersey
Mar 1, 1989		No. 12 Seton Hall	L 68–80	17–9 (6–9)	Providence Civic Center; Providence, Rhode Island
Mar 4, 1989		Boston College	W 102–76	18–9 (7–9)	Providence Civic Center; Providence, Rhode Island
Big East Tournament
Mar 10, 1989*	(6)	vs. (3) No. 5 Syracuse; Big East Tournament Quarterfinal	L 76–79	18–10	Madison Square Garden; New York, New York
NCAA Tournament
Mar 16, 1989*	(12 SE)	vs. (5 SE) Virginia; First Round	L 97–100	18–11	Memorial Gymnasium; Nashville, Tennessee
*Non-conference game. ^{#}Rankings from AP Poll. (#) Tournament seedings in parentheses. SE=Southeast.
