= Charles Smith (basketball, born 1967) =

American basketball player

Personal information
- Born: November 29, 1967 (age 58) Washington, D.C., U.S.
- Listed height: 6 ft 1 in (1.85 m)
- Listed weight: 160 lb (73 kg)

Career information
- High school: All Saints (Washington, D.C.)
- College: Georgetown (1985–1989)
- NBA draft: 1989: undrafted
- Playing career: 1989–2001
- Position: Point guard
- Number: 3, 13

Career history
- 1989–1990: Boston Celtics
- 1990–1991: Rapid City Thrillers
- 1991: Boston Celtics
- 1991: Rockford Lightning
- 1994: Rockford Lightning
- 1994–1995: Hartford Hellcats
- 1995: Omaha Racers
- 1995: Florida Sharks
- 1995: Florida Beach Dogs
- 1995: Minnesota Timberwolves
- 1996: Florida Beach Dogs
- 1996: Florida Sharks
- 1996: Red Star Belgrade
- 1996–1997: Florida Beach Dogs
- 1997: Iraklis
- 1997: Rockford Lightning
- 1997–1998: La Crosse Bobcats
- 1998: Ourense
- 1998: Vaqueros de Bayamón
- 1998–1999: Serapide Pozzuoli
- 1999: Obras Sanitarias
- 1999–2000: Record Napoli
- 2000: Media Broker Messina
- 2000–2001: La Crosse Bobcats
- 2001: Liège Basket

Career highlights
- CBA assists leader (1996); Second-team All-American – AP, UPI (1989); Big East Player of the Year (1989); First-team All-Big East (1989); Second-team All-Big East (1988)

Career NBA statistics
- Points: 186
- Rebounds: 76
- Assists: 115
- Stats at NBA.com
- Stats at Basketball Reference
Medals
Men's basketball
Representing United States
Olympic Games
Bronze medal – third place	1988 Seoul	Team competition

Charles Edward Smith IV (born November 29, 1967) is an American former professional basketball player who played with the Boston Celtics and Minnesota Timberwolves in the National Basketball Association (NBA). Smith was also a member of the bronze medal-winning 1988 United States Olympic team and was an All-American college player at Georgetown.

== College career ==
Smith was born in Washington, D.C., where he attended All Saints High School. At Georgetown University he was the Big East Men's Basketball Player of the Year for the 1988–89 season.

Smith also played for the 1988 United States Men's Olympic Basketball Team, the last American team not to feature NBA players.

== Professional career ==
After his college career, Smith went undrafted during the 1989 NBA draft, but he went on to play for the Boston Celtics and the Minnesota Timberwolves.

== Conviction of vehicular homicide ==
On March 12, 1992, Smith was convicted of vehicular homicide and leaving the scene of a crime in the hit-and-run deaths of two Boston University students on March 22, 1991. He subsequently served time in prison for the case.

== Shooting ==
On October 21, 2010, Smith was shot twice in the chest at his home in Bowie, Maryland. Smith underwent surgery and survived. The next day, police discovered "large quantity of cocaine and evidence of a gambling operation" in a search of his home.

== Career statistics ==
Legend
GP	Games played	GS	Games started	MPG	Minutes per game
FG%	Field goal percentage	3P%	3-point field goal percentage	FT%	Free throw percentage
RPG	Rebounds per game	APG	Assists per game	SPG	Steals per game
BPG	Blocks per game	PPG	Points per game	**Bold**	Career high

=== NBA ===
==== Regular season ====
Year	Team	GP	GS	MPG	FG%	3P%	FT%	RPG	APG	SPG	BPG	PPG
1989–90	Boston	**60**	0	**8.7**	**.444**	.000	**.697**	**1.2**	**1.7**	**.6**	**.1**	**2.9**
1990–91	Boston	5	0	6.0	.429	–	.600	.4	1.2	.2	.0	1.8
1995–96	Minnesota	8	0	4.9	.300	.000	.000	.6	.8	.1	.0	.8
Career		73	0	8.1	.433	.000	.675	1.0	1.6	.5	.0	2.5

==== Playoffs ====
Year	Team	GP	GS	MPG	FG%	3P%	FT%	RPG	APG	SPG	BPG	PPG
1990	Boston	3	0	3.0	.500	–	–	.3	1.0	.3	.0	.7
