= Glenn Mosley (basketball) =

American basketball player

Personal information
- Born: December 26, 1955 (age 70) Newark, New Jersey, U.S.
- Listed height: 6 ft 8 in (2.03 m)
- Listed weight: 195 lb (88 kg)

Career information
- High school: Irvington Tech (Irvington, New Jersey)
- College: Seton Hall (1973–1977)
- NBA draft: 1977: 1st round, 20th overall pick
- Drafted by: Philadelphia 76ers
- Playing career: 1977–1985
- Position: Power forward
- Number: 34

Career history
- 1977: Philadelphia 76ers
- 1978: Lancaster Red Roses
- 1978–1979: San Antonio Spurs
- 1980: Walk Tall Jeansmakers
- 1980–1982: Liberti / Benetton Treviso
- 1982–1983: CSP Limoges
- 1984–1985: Ferro Carril Oeste

Career highlights
- NCAA rebounding leader (1977); No. 34 retired by Seton Hall Pirates
- Stats at NBA.com
- Stats at Basketball Reference

Glenn E. "Smiles" Mosley (born December 26, 1955) is an American former professional basketball player for the Philadelphia 76ers and San Antonio Spurs of the National Basketball Association (NBA). Mosley played in the league for just the 1977–78 and 1978–79 seasons and averaged 3.1 points 2.2 rebounds per game. Mosley also played for part of one season in the Continental Basketball Association for the Lancaster Red Roses in 1978, and after his NBA career he played abroad in Italy, France and Argentina. While playing for CSP Limoges in France, Mosley won the Ligue Nationale de Basketball and Korać Cup in 1983.

Mosley, from Newark, New Jersey, played college basketball at Seton Hall University in nearby South Orange. He played for the Pirates from 1973–74 to 1976–77 where compiled career totals of 1,441 points and 1,263 rebounds. Mosley's 15.2 rebounds per game for his career lists high on the NCAA's all-time list, and his 16.3 per game as a senior led all of NCAA Division I.

The Philadelphia 76ers selected him in the first round (20th overall) in the 1977 NBA draft. After two years in the league with two different teams, Mosley embarked on his international professional career.

== Career statistics ==
Legend
GP	Games played	GS	Games started	MPG	Minutes per game
FG%	Field goal percentage	3P%	3-point field goal percentage	FT%	Free throw percentage
RPG	Rebounds per game	APG	Assists per game	SPG	Steals per game
BPG	Blocks per game	PPG	Points per game	**Bold**	Career high

=== NBA ===
==== Regular season ====
Year	Team	GP	GS	MPG	FG%	FT%	RPG	APG	SPG	BPG	PPG
1977–78	Philadelphia	6	0	3.5	.385	.429	.8	.3	.0	.0	2.2
1978–79	San Antonio	**26**		**8.5**	**.413**	**.605**	**2.5**	**.7**	**.3**	**.4**	**3.3**
Career		32	0	7.6	.409	.578	2.2	.7	.3	.3	3.1

==== Playoffs ====
Year	Team	GP	MPG	FG%	FT%	RPG	APG	SPG	BPG	PPG
1979	San Antonio	3	2.0	.667	.333	.3	.3	.0	.3	1.7

== See also ==
- List of NCAA Division I men's basketball season rebounding leaders
