= Jayson Williams =

American basketball player (born 1968)

Personal information
- Born: February 22, 1968 (age 58) Ritter, South Carolina, U.S.
- Listed height: 6 ft 9 in (2.06 m)
- Listed weight: 240 lb (109 kg)

Career information
- High school: Christ the King (Queens, New York)
- College: St. John's (1987–1990)
- NBA draft: 1990: 1st round, 21st overall pick
- Drafted by: Phoenix Suns
- Playing career: 1990–2000, 2005
- Position: Power forward / center
- Number: 55

Career history
- 1990–1992: Philadelphia 76ers
- 1992–2000: New Jersey Nets

Career highlights
- NBA All-Star (1998); Second-team All-Big East (1989)

Career NBA statistics
- Points: 3,472 (7.3 ppg)
- Rebounds: 3,584 (7.5 rpg)
- Assists: 287 (0.6 apg)
- Stats at NBA.com
- Stats at Basketball Reference

Jayson Williams (born February 22, 1968) is an American former professional basketball player who played in the National Basketball Association (NBA) for eleven seasons, primarily with the New Jersey Nets. He played his first two seasons with the Philadelphia 76ers, who acquired him in trade with the Phoenix Suns following the 1990 NBA draft. Williams spent the remainder of his career with the Nets and was an All-Star in 1998. He was inducted into the New York City Basketball Hall of Fame in 2016.

Williams was charged in 2002 with the accidental shooting death of a limousine driver. He pled guilty to aggravated assault in 2010 and served a 27-month prison sentence.

== Early life ==
Williams was born in Ritter, South Carolina, to Elijah Joshua "EJ" Williams and Barbara Williams. He is of Polish, Italian and African-American descent. His mother Barbara worked for years at Gouverneur skilled nursing facility in lower Manhattan. Raised Catholic, Williams moved to Brooklyn at the age of twelve and attended Christ The King Regional High School and St. John's University, both in New York City, and played on the basketball team at both.

== Professional career ==
Williams was selected by the Phoenix Suns in the first round with the 21st pick of the 1990 NBA draft. His draft rights were thereafter traded by the Suns to the Philadelphia 76ers for a 1993 first-round draft choice on October 28, 1990. After two seasons as a bench player with the 76ers, Williams was traded to the New Jersey Nets for conditional draft choices on October 8, 1992.

While with the Nets, Williams only earned 12 starts in his first three seasons with the team before finally earning a full-time starting position in the 1996–97 season.

In the first game of the following season, Williams set a franchise record with 17 offensive rebounds (20 total) in a win over the Indiana Pacers.

In that 1997–98 season, Williams was named an All Star. He led the league in offensive rebounds and offensive rebound percentage while also finishing the season in the top five in total rebounds, rebounds per game, total rebound percentage and offensive rating.

=== Injury and retirement ===
Williams' career came to a sudden end on April 1, 1999, after he broke his right leg in a collision with teammate Stephon Marbury in a game against the Atlanta Hawks. The following day, Williams underwent career-ending surgery in which a plate and five screws were inserted into his leg. After sitting out the entire 1999–2000 season, Williams officially announced his retirement on June 28, 2000, at the age of 32 after 11 seasons. At the time of the injury, Williams was in the first year of a six-year, $90 million contract.

In 2005, he briefly came out of retirement to play for the Idaho Stampede of the Continental Basketball Association.

== Legal incidents ==
In 1992, Williams was accused of breaking a beer mug over a patron's head at a saloon in Chicago.

In 1994, Williams was accused of firing a semiautomatic weapon into the parking lot at the Meadowlands Sports Complex.

He was never criminally charged in either case.

=== The death of Gus Christofi ===
On February 14, 2002, 55-year-old limousine driver Costas "Gus" Christofi was shot and killed at Williams's estate in Alexandria Township, New Jersey. Christofi had been hired to drive Williams's NBA charity team from a Bethlehem, Pennsylvania, event to his mansion, about 30 miles (48 km) northwest of Trenton, New Jersey. Members of Williams's NBA charity basketball team were present at the scene. The New York Post reported that Williams was showing people around his 30,000-square-foot (2,800 m^{2}) house when he aimed a shotgun at Christofi and killed him.

=== Initial trial and appeal ===
In April 2004, Williams was acquitted of the more serious charges against him, but the court's jury deadlocked on a charge of reckless manslaughter. He was convicted on four counts of trying to cover up the shooting.

On April 21, 2006, a Hunterdon County appeals court ruled that Williams could be retried on a reckless manslaughter charge.

=== Suicidal agitation ===
The New York City Police Department (NYPD) reported on April 27, 2009, that Williams had become suicidal and violent in a NYC hotel room. Upon entering the Manhattan hotel room police said that Williams was visibly intoxicated, and that empty bottles of prescription medications were found around the room. Officers stunned him with a taser and took him to a hospital.

=== Bar fight ===
A few weeks after the NYC tasering incident, on May 24, 2009, Williams allegedly punched a man in the face at a bar in Raleigh, North Carolina. He was charged with simple assault. The charges were later dropped.

=== Drunken car accident ===
A few days before an important courtroom appearance, Williams crashed his Mercedes into a tree in lower Manhattan. He was charged with driving while intoxicated (DWI) after this early morning accident on January 5, 2010.

=== Convictions and sentencing ===
On January 11, 2010, Williams pleaded guilty to aggravated assault in the 2002 death of Christofi. A month later, he was sentenced to 5 years in prison with possible parole after 18 months.

He was convicted and sentenced to an additional year in Rikers Island for the DWI. of which he served 8 months.

Williams was ultimately released from prison in April 2012.

=== Effects of prison ===
After being released from his 27 months in prison, Williams told ESPN: "I don't want to see anybody in a cage, man. Everybody thinks they're so tough... I've never seen a newbie go to jail and not cry the first two months every night, scream and have to get suicide prevention in front of his cell."

At that time, Williams reported being haunted not only by the shooting but also by how that incident contributed to the death of his own father: "I struggle with the loss of lives. The loss of Mr. Christofi and the loss of my father. An hour doesn't go by that I don't think about [the accident], think about how can I replay this as to bring back Mr. Christofi. And not one person died that night, two people died. My dad had never been in the hospital in 70 years. That's the ripple effect."

== Indoor lacrosse ==
Williams was the principal owner of the New Jersey Storm of the National Lacrosse League (NLL). The franchise operated for two seasons, 2002 and 2003, before moving to Anaheim, California, and becoming the Anaheim Storm.

The team went out of business before the start of the 2006 season.

== Books ==
Following his NBA retirement, Williams wrote Loose Balls: Easy Money, Hard Fouls, Cheap Laughs and True Love in the NBA (not to be confused with the Loose Balls book revolving around the life and death of the American Basketball Association), a memoir that was published in 2001. Intended to be a humorous perspective on his life in the NBA, later readers noted that the book contained nine separate episodes in which Williams behaved recklessly with guns. In one incident, the former NFL football player Wayne Chrebet was nearly shot. In another, the uncle of Manute Bol was threatened with an unloaded handgun.

In 2012, Williams published a second book, an autobiography entitled Humbled ~ Letters From Prison. The book included revelations about him having been abused as a child.

A third book, Crashing: A Memoir, was published in December 2018.

== Personal life ==
In 1996, Williams proposed during halftime of a nationally televised basketball game to model Cynthia Bailey. The two later parted.

Williams married Kellie Batiste in December 1999; they divorced soon afterward. In 2000, he married Tanya Young and together they had two daughters. The couple divorced in 2011. Young was a cast member of VH1's reality TV show Basketball Wives: LA.

Williams' father, Elijah Joshua Williams, died of a stroke at the age of 76 in November 2009. Williams had three sisters, with two having died from AIDS (one after a blood transfusion following a mugging), while his third sister was killed by her husband in a murder–suicide.

== Legacy ==
Williams was inducted into the New York City Basketball Hall of Fame with the Class of 2016 and into the St. John's University athletics Hall of Fame in 2023.

== NBA career statistics ==
Legend
GP	Games played	GS	Games started	MPG	Minutes per game
FG%	Field goal percentage	3P%	3-point field goal percentage	FT%	Free throw percentage
RPG	Rebounds per game	APG	Assists per game	SPG	Steals per game
BPG	Blocks per game	PPG	Points per game	**Bold**	Career high

=== Regular season ===
Year	Team	GP	GS	MPG	FG%	3P%	FT%	RPG	APG	SPG	BPG	PPG
1990–91	Philadelphia	52	1	9.8	.447	**.500**	.661	2.1	.3	.2	.1	3.5
1991–92	Philadelphia	50	8	12.9	.364	—	.636	2.9	.2	.4	.4	4.1
1992–93	New Jersey	12	2	11.6	.457	—	.389	3.4	.0	.3	.3	4.1
1993–94	New Jersey	70	0	12.5	.427	—	.605	3.8	.4	.2	.5	4.6
1994–95	New Jersey	75	6	13.1	.461	.000	.533	5.7	.5	.3	.4	4.8
1995–96	New Jersey	**80**	6	23.2	.423	.286	.592	10.0	.6	.4	.7	9.0
1996–97	New Jersey	41	40	**34.9**	.409	.000	.590	13.5	**1.2**	.6	.9	**13.4**
1997–98	New Jersey	65	**65**	36.0	**.498**	.000	**.666**	**13.6**	1.0	.7	.8	12.9
1998–99	New Jersey	30	30	34.0	.445	.000	.565	12.0	1.1	**.8**	**2.0**	8.1
Career		475	158	20.6	.440	.125	.606	7.5	.6	.4	.6	7.3
All-Star		1	0	19.0	.667	—	—	10.0	1.0	.0	.0	4.0

=== Playoffs ===
Year	Team	GP	GS	MPG	FG%	3P%	FT%	RPG	APG	SPG	BPG	PPG
1991	Philadelphia	**4**	0	2.5	**.800**	—	—	1.0	.0	.0	.0	2.0
1994	New Jersey	2	0	8.5	.000	—	**.500**	1.5	.0	.0	.0	.5
1998	New Jersey	3	**2**	**38.7**	.429	—	**.500**	**14.0**	**1.7**	**.7**	**1.0**	**7.0**
Career		9	2	15.9	.448	—	.500	5.4	.6	.2	.3	3.3
