= Ramón Ramos =

Puerto Rican basketball player

Personal information
- Born: November 20, 1967 (age 58) Canóvanas, Puerto Rico
- Listed height: 6 ft 8 in (2.03 m)
- Listed weight: 231 lb (105 kg)

Career information
- College: Seton Hall (1985–1989)
- NBA draft: 1989: undrafted
- Position: Power forward / center

Career history
- 1983–1989: Indios de Canóvanas

Career highlights
- First-team All-Big East (1989)
Medals
Men's basketball
Representing Puerto Rico
Pan American Games
| Bronze medal – third place | Indianapolis 1987 | National team |
Tournament of the Americas
| Gold medal – first place | Mexico City 1989 | National team |
| Silver medal – second place | Montevideo 1988 | National team |

Ramón Luis Ramos Manso (born November 20, 1967) is a Puerto Rican former basketball player. He began his career in the early 1980s with Indios de Canóvanas, then played college basketball at Seton Hall University. Ramos was signed as an undrafted free agent by the Portland Trail Blazers of the National Basketball Association in 1989, but would never play an NBA game after suffering severe injuries in a car crash.

== Career in Puerto Rico ==
Born in the Puerto Rican municipality of Canóvanas, Ramos attended Catholic all-boys school Colegio San José, and played basketball and baseball. He began his basketball career in 1983 as a reserve center on now-defunct hometown team Indios de Canóvanas. He helped the Indios win back to back BSN league titles in 1983 and 1984. In 1987, Ramos played on the national under-21 team that won the gold medal at the Centrobasket Under 21 competition after defeating Cuba 94–78 in Caguas. He played for Puerto Rico at the 1988 Summer Olympics.

== College and NBA career ==
In 1985, Ramos relocated to the United States to attend Seton Hall University and played for the Pirates in the Big East Conference for all four years. He was selected to the All-Big East First Team and awarded the Big East's Scholar athlete during the 1988–89 season and was named to the Big East All-Tournament First Team during the 1988 and 1989 NCAA tournaments. In his senior year, he averaged 11.9 points and 7.6 rebounds per game as Seton Hall reached their first and only Final Four in 1989, and progressed to the championship game. Ramos finished with nine points and five rebounds as the Pirates lost to the Michigan Wolverines 80–79 in overtime.

Ramos went undrafted in the 1989 NBA draft, and signed as a free agent during the 1989–90 preseason with the Portland Trail Blazers and was initially placed on the injured list due to tendinitis in his knee. He was promoted to the active roster shortly after being cleared to resume playing on December 5, filling the roster spot vacated by the waived Robert Reid. However, Ramos would never play in an NBA game, not leaving the bench for the next five games, and then having his career cut short eleven days later in a car crash.

== Accident ==
On December 16, 1989, after a home game against the Golden State Warriors, Ramos lost control of the car he was driving on Portland's Interstate 5 after hitting a patch of ice, causing him to cross the center median and flip several times. Ramos, who was not wearing a seatbelt and was thrown from the vehicle, suffered brain damage and remained in a coma for three months. Though alcohol was not a factor, Ramos had been speeding prior to the crash. The Blazers kept his locker space intact, complete with his game uniform, for the remainder of the 1989–90 season and several seasons to follow. He was paralyzed from the waist down for a year after the crash, while his speech was severely affected.

During the summer of 1991, more than 20,000 fans turned out to help the Trail Blazers raise $130,000 for a trust fund in Ramos's name at Slam ‘N Jam, an outdoor basketball and music event in what is now Providence Park. Players from throughout the NBA came to play in the benefit game. Ramos and his parents were special guests and drew a long, standing ovation when they were introduced.

Ramos has difficulty walking and doing everyday things, and he requires constant supervision by his parents. His story has been shown several times on Puerto Rican and American television.

Ramos was inducted into the Seton Hall University Athletics Hall of Fame in February 2006. This marked Ramos's first return to New Jersey since his graduation.

== See also ==
- List of Puerto Ricans
