= John Morton (basketball) =

American basketball player

Saint Peter's Peacocks
- Title: Assistant coach
- League: Metro Atlantic Athletic Conference

Personal information
- Born: May 18, 1967 (age 59) The Bronx, New York, U.S.
- Listed height: 6 ft 3 in (1.91 m)
- Listed weight: 180 lb (82 kg)

Career information
- High school: Walton (The Bronx, New York)
- College: Seton Hall (1985–1989)
- NBA draft: 1989: 1st round, 25th overall pick
- Drafted by: Cleveland Cavaliers
- Playing career: 1989–2002
- Position: Point guard
- Number: 23
- Coaching career: 2006–present

Career history

Playing
- 1989–1991: Cleveland Cavaliers
- 1991–1992: Miami Heat
- 1992–1993: Rapid City Thrillers
- 1993–1994: 7Up Joventut
- 1994: Rapid City Thrillers
- 1994–1995: Somontano Huesca
- 1995–1998: CB Gran Canaria
- 1998–1999: Covirán Cervezas Alhambra
- 1999–2000: Richmond Rhythm
- 2000: Shell Turbo Chargers
- 2001–2002: Canarias Telecom
- 2002: Banca Popolare Ragusa

Career highlights
- 2× Spanish League Top Scorer (1996, 1997); Haggerty Award (1989); Third-team All-Big East (1989)
- Stats at NBA.com
- Stats at Basketball Reference

John Morton (born May 18, 1967) is a retired American professional basketball player and current assistant coach for the Saint Peter's Peacocks. At a height of 6′3″ (1.91 m) and 180 pounds (82 kg), he played at the point guard position.

== College playing career ==
Morton played college basketball for the Seton Hall Pirates, from 1985 to 1989.

== Professional playing career ==
Morton was picked in the first round of the 1989 NBA draft. He played for only three NBA seasons (1990–1992), playing with the Cleveland Cavaliers and the Miami Heat. He averaged 4.8 points, 1.3 rebounds, and 2.7 assists per game.

== Coaching career ==
Morton worked as an assistant basketball coach at Fordham in 2010. In 2018, Morton was hired as an assistant coach for Saint Peter's University.

== Career statistics ==
Legend
| GP | Games played | GS | Games started | MPG | Minutes per game |
| FG% | Field goal percentage | 3P% | 3-point field goal percentage | FT% | Free throw percentage |
| RPG | Rebounds per game | APG | Assists per game | SPG | Steals per game |
| BPG | Blocks per game | PPG | Points per game | **Bold** | Career high |

=== NBA ===
==== Regular season ====
| Year | Team | GP | GS | MPG | FG% | 3P% | FT% | RPG | APG | SPG | BPG | PPG |
|---|---|---|---|---|---|---|---|---|---|---|---|---|
| 1989–90 | Cleveland | 37 | **3** | 10.9 | .298 | .233 | .694 | .9 | 1.8 | .5 | .1 | 3.9 |
| 1990–91 | Cleveland | **66** | 2 | **18.3** | **.438** | **.333** | .813 | 1.6 | **3.7** | **.9** | **.3** | **5.4** |
| 1991–92 | Cleveland | 4 | 0 | 13.5 | .250 | .000 | **.889** | **1.8** | 1.3 | .3 | 0.0 | 3.5 |
| 1991–92 | Miami | 21 | 0 | 10.3 | .407 | .133 | .828 | .9 | 1.3 | .5 | 0.0 | 4.4 |
| Career | | 128 | 5 | 14.7 | .386 | .224 | .787 | 1.3 | 2.7 | .7 | .2 | 4.8 |
