= Los Angeles Clippers accomplishments and records =

This page details the all-time statistics, records, and other achievements pertaining to the Los Angeles Clippers of the National Basketball Association.

== Individual awards ==
NBA Rookie of the Year

- Terry Cummings – 1983
- Blake Griffin – 2011

NBA Most Improved Player

- Bobby Simmons – 2005

NBA Sixth Man of the Year

- Jamal Crawford – 2014, 2016
- Lou Williams – 2018, 2019
- Montrezl Harrell – 2020

NBA Sportsmanship Award

- Elton Brand – 2006

NBA Teammate of the Year

- Chauncey Billups – 2013

NBA Executive of the Year

- Elgin Baylor – 2006

All-NBA First Team

- Chris Paul – 2012–2014
- DeAndre Jordan – 2016
- Kawhi Leonard – 2021

All-NBA Second Team

- Elton Brand – 2006
- Blake Griffin – 2012–2014
- Chris Paul – 2015, 2016
- Kawhi Leonard – 2020

All-NBA Third Team

- Dominique Wilkins – 1994
- Blake Griffin – 2015
- DeAndre Jordan – 2015, 2017
- Paul George – 2021
- James Harden -2025

NBA All-Defensive First Team

- Chris Paul – 2012–2017
- DeAndre Jordan – 2015, 2016

NBA All-Defensive Second Team

- Patrick Beverley – 2020
- Kawhi Leonard – 2020, 2021
- Ivica Zubac – 2025

NBA All-Rookie First Team

- Terry Cummings – 1983
- Charles Smith – 1989
- Lamar Odom – 2000
- Darius Miles – 2001
- Al Thornton – 2008
- Blake Griffin – 2011

NBA All-Rookie Second Team

- Brent Barry – 1996
- Maurice Taylor – 1998
- Michael Olowokandi – 1999
- Eric Gordon – 2009
- Eric Bledsoe – 2011
- Shai Gilgeous-Alexander – 2019
- Landry Shamet – 2019

== Franchise Hall of Famers ==
Los Angeles Clippers Hall of Famers
Players
No.	Name	Position	Tenure	Inducted
32	Bill Walton	C	1979–1985	1993
11	Bob McAdoo	F/C	1972–1976	2000
20	Moses Malone	C/F	1976	2001
21	Dominique Wilkins	F	1994	2006
44	Adrian Dantley	F/G	1976–1977	2008
52	Jamaal Wilkes	F	1985	2012
33	Grant Hill	F	2012–2013	2018
34	Paul Pierce	F	2015–2017	2021
Coaches
Name		Position	Tenure	Inducted
Jack Ramsay		Head coach	1972–1976	1992
Larry Brown		Head coach	1992–1993	2002
Bill Fitch		Head coach	1994–1998	2019
Contributors
Cotton Fitzsimmons		Head coach	1977–1978	2021

== All-Star Weekend ==
NBA All-Star Game Selections

- Norm Nixon – 1985
- Marques Johnson – 1986
- Danny Manning – 1993, 1994
- Elton Brand – 2002, 2006
- Chris Kaman – 2010
- Blake Griffin – 2011–2015
- Chris Paul – 2012–2016
- DeAndre Jordan – 2017
- Paul George - 2021, 2023, 2024
- Kawhi Leonard – 2020–2021, 2024, 2026
- James Harden - 2025

NBA All-Star Game Most Valuable Player

- Randy Smith – 1978
- Chris Paul – 2013
- Kawhi Leonard – 2020

Slam Dunk champion

- Brent Barry – 1996
- Blake Griffin – 2011

== Franchise individual career records for regular season ==
Accurate as of the 2025–26 NBA season
Bold denotes still active with team.
Italic denotes still active, but not with team.

Career records
Category	Player	Statistics
Minutes played	Randy Smith	24,393
Games played	DeAndre Jordan	750
Triple-doubles	James Harden	8
Total field goals made	Randy Smith	5,214
3-point field goals made	Paul George	820
Free throws made	Corey Maggette	3,122
Total rebounds	DeAndre Jordan	7,988
Assists	Chris Paul	4,076
Steals	Randy Smith	1,072
Blocks	DeAndre Jordan	1,277
Points	Randy Smith	12,735
Player efficiency rating	Chris Paul	26.0

=== Games played ===
Most games played all-time
Most games played all-time
Player	Games
DeAndre Jordan	750
Randy Smith	715
Eric Piatkowski	616
Loy Vaught	558
Ivica Zubac	513
Corey Maggette	512
Blake Griffin	504
Chris Kaman	493
Elton Brand	459
Gary Grant	446

=== Minutes ===
Minutes played all-time
Minutes played all-time
Player	Minutes
Randy Smith	24,393
DeAndre Jordan	21,045
Blake Griffin	17,706
Elton Brand	17,595
Corey Maggette	15,780
Loy Vaught	15,671
Chris Kaman	14,661
Chris Paul	14,113
Ken Norman	13,584
Bob McAdoo	13,381

Highest minutes per game all-time
Highest minutes per game all-time
Player	Minutes
Bob McAdoo	40.1
Elmore Smith	39.1
Elton Brand	38.3
World B. Free	37.9
Ron Harper	37.7
Jim McMillian	37.0
Cuttino Mobley	36.3
Mark Jackson	36.2
Terry Cummings	36.0
Blake Griffin	35.1

=== Points ===
Most points all-time
Most points scored all-time
Player	Points
Randy Smith	12,735
Blake Griffin	10,863
Bob McAdoo	9,434
Elton Brand	9,336
Corey Maggette	8,835
**Kawhi Leonard**	8,296
Chris Paul	7,721
Danny Manning	7,120
DeAndre Jordan	7,078
Loy Vaught	6,614

Highest points per game all-time
Highest points per game all-time
Player	Points
World B. Free	29.4
Bob McAdoo	28.2
**Kawhi Leonard**	25.1
Terry Cummings	23.3
Paul George	23.0
Blake Griffin	21.6
James Harden	21.1
Elton Brand	20.3
Ron Harper	19.3
Danny Manning	19.1

=== Rebounds ===
Most total rebounds all-time
Most total rebounds all-time
Player	Rebounds
DeAndre Jordan	7,988
Ivica Zubac	4,771
Elton Brand	4,710
Blake Griffin	4,686
Loy Vaught	4,471
Bob McAdoo	4,229
Swen Nater	4,168
Chris Kaman	4,109
Benoit Benjamin	3,538
Randy Smith	2,985

Most offensive rebounds all-time
Most offensive rebounds all-time
Player	Rebounds
DeAndre Jordan	2,435
Elton Brand	1,769
Ivica Zubac	1,544
Loy Vaught	1,369
Blake Griffin	1,201
Swen Nater	1,191
Chris Kaman	1,091
Ken Norman	1,032
Michael Cage	1,019
Bob McAdoo	895

Highest rebounds per game all-time
Highest rebounds per game all-time
Player	Rebounds
Elmore Smith	13.8
Bob McAdoo	12.7
Swen Nater	12.0
Marcus Camby	11.6
DeAndre Jordan	10.7
Elton Brand	10.3
Terry Cummings	10.1
Ivica Zubac	9.3
Blake Griffin	9.3
John Shumate	9.2

=== Assists ===
Most assists all-time
Most assists all-time
Player	Assists
Chris Paul	4,076
Randy Smith	3,498
Gary Grant	2,810
Norm Nixon	2,540
Blake Griffin	2,133
James Harden	1,659
Ron Harper	1,463
Ernie DiGregorio	1,457
Mark Jackson	1,402
Baron Davis	1,398

Most assists per game all-time
Most assists per game all-time
Player	Assists per game
Chris Paul	9.6
Norm Nixon	9.0
Mark Jackson	8.7
James Harden	8.5
Baron Davis	7.6
Gary Grant	6.3
Ernie DiGregorio	5.6
Jeff McInnis	5.5
Sam Cassell	5.4
Larry Drew	5.3

Highest assist percentage all-time
Highest assist percentage all-time
Player	Assist pct.
Chris Paul	47.5
Baron Davis	39.1
Norm Nixon	38.2
James Harden	35.5
Darnell Valentine	35.5
Gary Grant	35.4
Randy Woods	33.9
Sam Cassell	33.7
Mark Jackson	32.7
Larry Drew	30.6

=== Blocks ===
Most blocks all-time
Most blocks all-time
Player	Blocks
DeAndre Jordan	1,277
Benoit Benjamin	1,117
Elton Brand	1,039
Chris Kaman	707
Bob McAdoo	614
Ivica Zubac	536
Michael Olowokandi	527
Gar Heard	477
Charles Smith	451
Bo Outlaw	421

Most blocks per game all-time
Most blocks per game all-time
Player	Blocks per game
Benoit Benjamin	2.8
Bob McAdoo	2.4
Bill Walton	2.3
Elton Brand	2.3
Marcus Camby	2.0
Gar Heard	1.7
DeAndre Jordan	1.7
James Donaldson	1.7
Charles Smith	1.7
Michael Olowokandi	1.6

Highest block percentage all-time
Highest block percentage all-time
Player	Block pct.
Keith Closs	6.7
Bo Outlaw	5.5
Benoit Benjamin	5.0
Marcus Camby	4.9
DeAndre Jordan	4.8
Bill Walton	4.7
Ryan Hollins	4.6
Stanley Roberts	4.5
Elton Brand	4.4
Elmore Spencer	4.1

=== Steals ===
Most steals all-time
Most steals all-time
Player	Steals
Randy Smith	1,072
Chris Paul	913
Gary Grant	747
Ron Harper	606
**Kawhi Leonard**	548
Danny Manning	548
Blake Griffin	484
Loy Vaught	468
DeAndre Jordan	448
Elton Brand	438

Most steals per game all-time
Most steals per game all-time
Player	Steals per game
Chris Paul	2.1
Ron Harper	2.0
Randy Smith	1.9
Gary Grant	1.7
**Kris Dunn**	1.7
**Kawhi Leonard**	1.7
Baron Davis	1.6
Mark Jackson	1.6
Marko Jarić	1.6
Brian Taylor	1.5

Highest steal percentage all-time
Highest steal percentage all-time
Player	Steal pct.
Harold Ellis	4.4
Randy Woods	3.8
Chris Paul	3.3
Gary Grant	3.2
**Kris Dunn**	3.2
Darnell Valentine	3.2
Marko Jarić	3.0
Eric Bledsoe	3.0
Tom Garrick	2.6
Ron Harper	2.6

=== Field goals ===
Most total field goals made all-time
Most total FGs made all-time
Player	Total FGs made
Randy Smith	5,214
Blake Griffin	4,161
Bob McAdoo	3,697
Elton Brand	3,549
**Kawhi Leonard**	2,998
Loy Vaught	2,890
DeAndre Jordan	2,860
Danny Manning	2,848
Ken Norman	2,783
Chris Paul	2,718

Most total field goal attempts all-time
Most total FG attempts all-time
Player	Total FG attempts
Randy Smith	11,035
Blake Griffin	8,125
Bob McAdoo	7,396
Elton Brand	6,902
Corey Maggette	5,972
**Kawhi Leonard**	5,955
Chris Paul	5,741
Loy Vaught	5,661
Ken Norman	5,553
Danny Manning	5,496

Most total field goal misses all-time
Most total FG misses all-time
Player	Total FG misses
Randy Smith	5,821
Blake Griffin	3,964
Bob McAdoo	3,699
Elton Brand	3,353
Corey Maggette	3,299
Chris Paul	3,023
**Kawhi Leonard**	2,957
Ron Harper	2,853
Loy Vaught	2,771
Ken Norman	2,770

Highest total field goal pct. all-time
Highest total FG pct. all-time
Player	Total FG pct.
DeAndre Jordan	.673
Ivica Zubac	.627
James Donaldson	.609
Montrezl Harrell	.607
Bo Outlaw	.574
Swen Nater	.542
Derek Smith	.540
Bill Walton	.532
Jerome Whitehead	.532
Chris Wilcox	.521

Highest effective shooting pct. all-time
Highest effective shooting pct. all-time
Player	Effective shooting pct.
DeAndre Jordan	.673
Ivica Zubac	.627
James Donaldson	.609
Montrezl Harrell	.608
Luke Kennard	.599
**Nicolas Batum**	.598
Norman Powell	.579
Bo Outlaw	.574
J.J. Redick	.574
**Kawhi Leonard**	.564

Highest true shooting pct. all-time
Highest true shooting pct. all-time
Player	True shooting pct.
Ryan Hollins	.696
James Donaldson	.660
Ivica Zubac	.653
DeAndre Jordan	.633
Montrezl Harrell	.628
Norman Powell	.619
Luke Kennard	.616
J.J. Redick	.615
**Kawhi Leonard**	.615
**Nicolas Batum**	.610

=== Three-point field goals ===
Most 3-pt FGs made all-time
Most 3-point FGs made all-time
Player	3-pt FGs made
Paul George	820
Eric Piatkowski	738
**Kawhi Leonard**	718
J.J. Redick	674
Jamal Crawford	662
Chris Paul	628
James Harden	556
**Nicolas Batum**	524
**Norman Powell**	473
Lou Williams	447

Most 3-pt FGs attempts all-time
Most 3-point FG attempts all-time
Player	3-pt FG attempts
Paul George	2,068
Jamal Crawford	1,872
Eric Piatkowski	1,835
**Kawhi Leonard**	1,800
Chris Paul	1,667
James Harden	1,545
J.J. Redick	1,532
**Nicolas Batum**	1,297
Lou Williams	1,243
Norman Powell	1,123

Highest 3-point percentage all-time
Highest 3-point percentage all-time
Player	3-pt pct.
Luke Kennard	.448
J.J. Redick	.440
**Darius Garland**	.438
Hedo Türkoğlu	.434
Tobias Harris	.426
Norman Powell	.421
Vladimir Radmanović	.418
Robert Covington	.415
**Kobe Sanders**	.408
Danilo Gallinari	.408

=== Free throws ===
Most FTs made all-time
Most FTs made all-time
Player	Free throws
Corey Maggette	3,122
Blake Griffin	2,397
Randy Smith	2,304
Elton Brand	2,236
Bob McAdoo	2,040
Chris Paul	1,657
**Kawhi Leonard**	1,582
Danny Manning	1,413
DeAndre Jordan	1,357
Charles Smith	1,335

Most FT attempts all-time
Most FT attempts all-time
Player	Free throws
Corey Maggette	3,791
Blake Griffin	3,524
DeAndre Jordan	3,045
Randy Smith	2,986
Elton Brand	2,972
Bob McAdoo	2,617
Danny Manning	1,906
Chris Paul	1,881
**Kawhi Leonard**	1,799
Benoit Benjamin	1,741

Highest free throw pct. all-time
Highest FT percentage all-time
Player	Free throw pct.
Danilo Gallinari	.909
Ernie DiGregorio	.906
J.J. Redick	.897
Junior Bridgeman	.883
James Harden	.883
Chris Paul	.881
Jamal Crawford	.880
Randy Foye	.880
**Kawhi Leonard**	.879
Paul George	.879

=== Triple-doubles ===
Most triple-doubles all-time
Most triple-doubles all-time
Player	Triple-doubles
James Harden	8
Bob Kauffman	7
Lamar Odom	7
Blake Griffin	7
Mark Jackson	4
Ron Harper	3
**Kawhi Leonard**	2
Chris Paul	2

== Franchise individual season records for regular season ==
Single-season records
Category	Player	Statistics
Minutes played	Bob McAdoo	3,539
Field goals	Bob McAdoo	1,095
3-point field goals	Paul George	243
Free throws	World B. Free	654
Offensive rebounds	DeAndre Jordan	397
Defensive rebounds	Swen Nater	864
Total rebounds	DeAndre Jordan	1,226
Assists	Norm Nixon	914
Steals	Randy Smith	203
Blocks	Bob McAdoo	246
Points	Bob McAdoo	2,831
Player efficiency rating	Kawhi Leonard	27.9

=== Minutes ===
(Correct as of the 2025–26 season)

Most minutes played, season
Most minutes played, season
Player	Minutes	Year
Bob McAdoo	3,539	1974–75
Bob McAdoo	3,328	1975–76
Jim McMillian	3,322	1973–74
Randy Smith	3,314	1977–78
Bob Kauffman	3,205	1971–72
Elmore Smith	3,186	1971–72
Bob McAdoo	3,185	1973–74
Randy Smith	3,167	1975–76
Ron Harper	3,144	1991–92
Mark Jackson	3,117	1992–93

Highest minutes per game, season
Highest minutes per game, season
Player	Minutes	Year
Bob McAdoo	43.2	1974–75
Bob McAdoo	43.0	1973–74
Bob McAdoo	42.7	1975–76
Bob Kauffman	41.6	1971–72
Elmore Smith	40.8	1971–72
Billy Knight	40.7	1977–78
Jim McMillian	40.5	1973–74
Randy Smith	40.4	1977–78
Bob Kauffman	39.6	1972–73
Elton Brand	39.6	2002–03

=== Points ===
(Correct as of the 2025–26 season)

Most points scored, season
Most points scored, season
Player	Points	Year
Bob McAdoo	2,831	1974–75
Bob McAdoo	2,427	1975–76
Bob McAdoo	2,261	1973–74
World B. Free	2,244	1978–79
World B. Free	2,055	1979–80
Randy Smith	2,021	1977–78
Elton Brand	1,953	2005–06
Blake Griffin	1,930	2013–14
Terry Cummings	1,854	1983–84
Blake Griffin	1,845	2010–11

Highest points per game, season
Highest points per game, season
Player	Points	Year
Bob McAdoo	34.5	1974–75
Bob McAdoo	31.1	1975–76
Bob McAdoo	30.6	1973–74
World B. Free	30.2	1979–80
World B. Free	28.8	1978–79
Kawhi Leonard	27.9	2025–26
Kawhi Leonard	27.1	2019–20
Kawhi Leonard	24.8	2020–21
Elton Brand	24.7	2005–06
Randy Smith	24.6	1977–78

=== Rebounds ===
(Correct as of the 2025–26 season)

Most total rebounds, season
Most total rebounds, season
Player	Rebounds	Year
DeAndre Jordan	1,226	2014–15
Swen Nater	1,216	1979–80
Elmore Smith	1,184	1971–72
DeAndre Jordan	1,171	2017–18
Bob McAdoo	1,155	1974–75
Bob McAdoo	1,117	1973–74
DeAndre Jordan	1,114	2013–14
DeAndre Jordan	1,114	2016–17
DeAndre Jordan	1,059	2015–16
Swen Nater	1,029	1977–78

Most offensive rebounds, season
Most offensive rebounds, season
Player	Rebounds	Year
DeAndre Jordan	397	2014–15
Elton Brand	396	2001–02
Michael Cage	371	1987–88
Michael Cage	354	1986–87
Swen Nater	352	1979–80
DeAndre Jordan	331	2013–14
DeAndre Jordan	329	2017–18
Terry Cummings	323	1983–84
Bob McAdoo	307	1974–75
Terry Cummings	303	1982–83

Highest rebounds per game, season
Highest rebounds per game, season
Player	Rebounds	Year
DeAndre Jordan	15.2	2017–18
Elmore Smith	15.2	1971–72
Bob McAdoo	15.1	1973–74
Swen Nater	15.0	1979–80
DeAndre Jordan	15.0	2014–15
Bob McAdoo	14.1	1974–75
DeAndre Jordan	13.8	2015–16
DeAndre Jordan	13.8	2016–17
DeAndre Jordan	13.6	2013–14
Swen Nater	13.2	1977–78

=== Assists ===
(Correct as of the 2025–26 season)

Most assists, season
Most assists, season
Player	Assists	Year
Norm Nixon	914	1983–84
Chris Paul	838	2014–15
Chris Paul	738	2015–16
Mark Jackson	724	1992–93
Norm Nixon	711	1984–85
James Harden	687	2024–25
Mark Jackson	678	1993–94
Chris Paul	678	2012–13
Ernie DiGregorio	663	1973–74
Chris Paul	663	2013–14

Most assists per game, season
Most assists per game, season
Player	Assists per game	Year
Norm Nixon	11.1	1983–84
Chris Paul	10.7	2013–14
Chris Paul	10.2	2014–15
Gary Grant	10.0	1989–90
Chris Paul	10.0	2015–16
Chris Paul	9.7	2012–13
Chris Paul	9.2	2016–17
Chris Paul	9.1	2011–12
Mark Jackson	8.8	1992–93
Norm Nixon	8.8	1984–85

Highest assist percentage, season
Highest assist percentage all-time
Player	Assist pct.	Year
Chris Paul	52.7	2015–16
Chris Paul	48.9	2013–14
Chris Paul	47.4	2014–15
Chris Paul	46.8	2016–17
Chris Paul	46.5	2012–13
Chris Paul	43.8	2011–12
Gary Grant	42.5	1989–90
Norm Nixon	41.1	1983–84
Norm Nixon	40.3	1985–86
Baron Davis	39.6	2009–10

=== Blocks ===
(Correct as of the 2025–26 season)

Most blocks, season
Most blocks, season
Player	Blocks	Year
Bob McAdoo	246	1973–74
Gar Heard	230	1973–74
Benoit Benjamin	225	1987–88
Benoit Benjamin	221	1988–89
Benoit Benjamin	206	1985–86
DeAndre Jordan	203	2013–14
Elton Brand	201	2005–06
Benoit Benjamin	187	1986–87
Benoit Benjamin	187	1989–90
DeAndre Jordan	183	2014–15

Most blocks per game, season
Most blocks per game, season
Player	Blocks per game	Year
Bill Walton	3.6	1982–83
Benoit Benjamin	3.4	1987–88
Bob McAdoo	3.3	1973–74
Gar Heard	2.8	1973–74
Benoit Benjamin	2.8	1988–89
Chris Kaman	2.8	2007–08
George Johnson	2.7	1976–77
Benoit Benjamin	2.6	1989–90
Benoit Benjamin	2.6	1985–86
Benoit Benjamin	2.6	1986–87

Highest block percentage, season
Highest block percentage, season
Player	Block pct.	Year
Bo Outlaw	6.7	1994–95
DeAndre Jordan	6.2	2011–12
Benoit Benjamin	5.9	1987–88
Chris Kaman	5.6	2007–08
DeAndre Jordan	5.4	2010–11
DeAndre Jordan	5.4	2013–14
DeAndre Jordan	5.4	2015–16
DeAndre Jordan	5.4	2014–15
Benoit Benjamin	5.3	1985–86
Marcus Camby	5.1	2008–09

=== Steals ===
(Correct as of the 2025–26 season)

Most steals, season
Most steals, season
Player	Steals	Year
Randy Smith	203	1973–74
Randy Smith	177	1978–79
Ron Harper	177	1992–93
Randy Smith	176	1976–77
Randy Smith	172	1977–78
Chris Paul	169	2012–13
Chris Paul	156	2014–15
Chris Paul	154	2013–14
Randy Smith	153	1975–76
Ron Harper	152	1991–92
Chris Paul	152	2011–12
Chris Paul	152	2015–16

Most steals per game, season
Most steals per game, season
Player	Steals per game	Year
Chris Paul	2.5	2011–12
Chris Paul	2.5	2013–14
Randy Smith	2.5	1973–74
Chris Paul	2.4	2012–13
Ron Harper	2.2	1992–93
Randy Smith	2.2	1978–79
Randy Smith	2.1	1976–77
Randy Smith	2.1	1977–78
Chris Paul	2.1	2015–16
Gary Grant	2.0	1988–89

Highest steal percentage, season
Highest steal percentage, season
Player	Steal pct.	Year
Chris Paul	3.8	2012–13
Chris Paul	3.8	2011–12
Gary Grant	3.7	1993–94
Eric Bledsoe	3.7	2012–13
Darnell Valentine	3.6	1987–88
Chris Paul	3.5	2013–14
Kris Dunn	3.5	2024–25
Gary Grant	3.4	1988–89
Gary Grant	3.4	1989–90
Gary Grant	3.3	1991–92

=== Field goals ===
(Correct as of the 2025–26 season)

Most total field goals made, season
Most total FGs made, season
Player	Total FGs made	Year
Bob McAdoo	1,095	1974–75
Bob McAdoo	934	1975–76
Bob McAdoo	901	1973–74
World B. Free	795	1978–79
Randy Smith	789	1977–78
Elton Brand	756	2005–06
World B. Free	737	1979–80
Terry Cummings	737	1983–84
Blake Griffin	718	2013–14
Randy Smith	702	1975–76
Randy Smith	702	1976–77
Danny Manning	702	1992–93

Most total field goal attempts, season
Most total FG attempts, season
Player	Total FG attempts	Year
Bob McAdoo	2,138	1974–75
Bob McAdoo	1,918	1975–76
Randy Smith	1,697	1977–78
World B. Free	1,653	1978–79
Bob McAdoo	1,647	1973–74
World B. Free	1,556	1979–80
Randy Smith	1,523	1978–79
Randy Smith	1,504	1976–77
Terry Cummings	1,491	1983–84
Elton Brand	1,435	2005–06

Highest effective shooting pct., season
Highest effective shooting pct., season
Player	Effective shooting pct.	Year
DeAndre Jordan	.714	2016–17
DeAndre Jordan	.711	2014–15
DeAndre Jordan	.703	2015–16
DeAndre Jordan	.676	2013–14
Ivica Zubac	.649	2023–24
DeAndre Jordan	.645	2017–18
DeAndre Jordan	.643	2012–13
James Donaldson	.637	1984–85
Montrezl Harrell	.636	2017–18
Ivica Zubac	.634	2022–23

Highest true shooting pct., season
Highest true shooting pct. all-time
Player	True shooting pct.	Year
Ivica Zubac	.693	2020–21
James Donaldson	.679	1984–85
DeAndre Jordan	.673	2016–17
Ivica Zubac	.671	2023–24
Ivica Zubac	.661	2022–23
Ivica Zubac	.660	2021–22
Ivica Zubac	.651	2019–20
DeAndre Jordan	.648	2017–18
James Donaldson	.648	1983–84
Montrezl Harrell	.647	2017–18

=== Three-point field goals ===
(Correct as of the 2025–26 season)

Most three-point field goals made, season
Most 3-point FGs made, season
Player	3-pt FGs made	Year
Paul George	243	2023–24
James Harden	235	2024–25
J.J. Redick	201	2016–17
J.J. Redick	200	2014–15
J.J. Redick	200	2015–16
Luke Kennard	190	2021–22
James Harden	186	2023–24
Lou Williams	186	2017–18
Norman Powell	179	2024–25
Kawhi Leonard	172	2025–26

Most three-point field goal attempts, season
Most 3-point FG attempts, season
Player	3-pt FG attempts	Year
James Harden	668	2024–25
Paul George	588	2023–24
Lou Williams	518	2017–18
Reggie Jackson	512	2021–22
James Harden	488	2023–24
J.J. Redick	468	2016–17
J.J. Redick	458	2014–15
Jamal Crawford	446	2013–14
Kawhi Leonard	445	2025–26
Rasual Butler	432	2009–10

Highest three-point percentage, season
Highest 3-point percentage, season
Player	3-pt pct.	Year
J.J. Redick	.475	2015–16
Marcus Morris	.473	2020–21
Eric Piatkowski	.466	2001–02
Luke Kennard	.449	2021–22
Luke Kennard	.446	2020–21
Terry Dehere	.440	1995–96
J.J. Redick	.437	2014–15
Norman Powell	.435	2023–24
Tobias Harris	.434	2018–19
Nicolas Batum	.433	2024–25

=== Free throws ===
(Correct as of the 2025–26 season)

Most free throws made, season
Most FTs made, season
Player	Free throws	Year
World B. Free	654	1978–79
Bob McAdoo	641	1974–75
World B. Free	572	1979–80
Corey Maggette	563	2004–05
Bob McAdoo	559	1975–76
Corey Maggette	553	2007–08
Corey Maggette	526	2003–04
Corey Maggette	519	2006–07
James Harden	505	2024–25
Blake Griffin	482	2013–14

Most free throw attempts, season
Most FT attempts, season
Player	Free throws	Year
World B. Free	865	1978–79
Bob McAdoo	796	1974–75
World B. Free	760	1979–80
Bob McAdoo	734	1975–76
Blake Griffin	695	2010–11
Corey Maggette	681	2007–08
Blake Griffin	674	2013–14
Corey Maggette	657	2004–05
Corey Maggette	633	2006–07
Corey Maggette	620	2003–04

Highest free throw pct., season
Highest FT percentage, season
Player	Free throw pct.	Year
Ernie DiGregorio	.945	1976–77
Paul George	.907	2023–24
Jamal Crawford	.904	2015–16
Danilo Gallinari	.904	2018–19
Ernie DiGregorio	.902	1973–74
J.J. Redick	.901	2014–15
James Harden	.901	2025–26
Jamal Crawford	.901	2014–15
Chris Paul	.900	2014–15
Chris Paul	.896	2015–16

=== Triple-doubles ===
(Correct as of the 2025–26 season)

Most triple-doubles, season
Most triple-doubles, season
Player	Triple-doubles	Year
Bob Kauffman	4	1972–73
Lamar Odom	4	2000–01
Mark Jackson	3	1992–93
Lamar Odom	3	1999–2000
James Harden	3	2023–24
James Harden	3	2024–25
Bob Kauffman	2	1970–71
Ron Harper	2	1993–94
Blake Griffin	2	2017–18
Blake Griffin	2	2010–11
James Harden	2	2025–26

=== Other ===
- Highest plus-minus in a season: +734 by Chris Paul, 2014–15

(Correct as of the 2025–26 season)

Most personal fouls, season
Most personal fouls, season
Player	Personal fouls	Year
Tom Chambers	341	1981–82
Tom Chambers	333	1982–83
Stanley Roberts	332	1992–93
Danny Manning	323	1992–93
Kermit Washington	317	1978–79
Derek Smith	317	1984–85
Kevin Kunnert	309	1978–79
Elmore Smith	306	1971–72
Michael Olowokandi	304	1999–2000
Gar Heard	300	1973–74

Most turnovers, season
Most turnovers, season
Player	Turnovers	Year
James Harden	341	2024–25
World B. Free	297	1978–79
Randy Smith	286	1977–78
Norm Nixon	273	1984–85
Lamar Odom	264	2000–01
Gary Grant	258	1988–89
Lamar Odom	258	1999–2000
Swen Nater	257	1979–80
Norm Nixon	257	1983–84
Randy Smith	255	1978–79

Lowest turnover percentage, season
Lowest turnover percentage, season
Player	Turnover pct.	Year
Norman Powell	7.3	2023–24
Quinton Ross	7.3	2006–07
Amir Coffey	7.4	2024–25
Quinton Ross	7.4	2007–08
J.J. Redick	7.4	2015–16
Marcus Morris	7.6	2022–23
Bingo Smith	7.7	1979–80
Rasual Butler	7.8	2009–10
Amir Coffey	8.0	2021–22
Kawhi Leonard	8.1	2022–23

== Franchise individual game records for regular season ==
- Most points in a game

- 55 by Kawhi Leonard vs the Detroit Pistons on December 28, 2025
- 55 by James Harden vs the Charlotte Hornets on November 22, 2025

- Most points scored in a single quarter

- 27 by Lou Williams vs the Golden State Warriors on January 10, 2018 (3rd Quarter)

- Most points scored in overtime

- 10 by Lou Williams vs the Golden State Warriors on November 12, 2018

- Most total rebounds in a game

- 32 by Swen Nater vs the Denver Nuggets on December 14, 1979

- Most offensive rebounds in a game

- 14 by Michael Cage vs the Boston Celtics on December 26, 1987

- Most total rebounds by a rookie in a game

- 25 by Bob McAdoo vs the Houston Rockets on March 28, 1973
- 25 by Elmore Smith vs the Portland Trail Blazers on March 7, 1972

- Most assists in a game

- 25 by Ernie DiGregorio vs the Trail Blazers on January 1, 1974

- Most assists without a turnover in a game

- 20 by Chris Paul vs the New Orlean Pelicans on December 10, 2016

- Most blocks in a game

- 10 by Benoit Benjamin vs San Antonio Spurs on March 31, 1989
- 10 by Benoit Benjamin vs Milwaukee Bucks on January 29, 1988

- Most blocks by a rookie in a game

- 8 by Darius Miles vs the Charlotte Hornets on January 5, 2001

- Most steals in a game

- 10 by Lou Williams vs the Utah Jazz on January 20, 2018

- Most steals by a rookie in a game

- 7 by Eric Bledsoe vs the Denver Nuggets on March 5, 2011
- 7 by Tyrone Nesby vs the Seattle Supersonics on May 5, 1999
- 7 by Craig Hodges vs the Houston Rockets on February 26, 1983

- Most 3-point field goals made in a game

- 11 by Robert Covington vs the Milwaukee Bucks on April 1, 2022

== Franchise individual records for playoffs ==
- Most points scored in a playoff game

- 50 by Bob McAdoo in Game 4 of the 1975 Eastern Conference Semifinals vs the Washington Bullets

- Most points scored in a playoff run

- 511 by Paul George, 2020–21

- Most points scored in the playoffs, all-time

- 1,125 by Chris Paul

- Most rebounds in a playoff game

- 22 by DeAndre Jordan vs the Golden State Warriors on April 24, 2014
- 22 by Bob McAdoo vs the Philadelphia 76ers on April 18, 1976

- Most assists in a playoff game

- 16 by Chris Paul in Game 3 of the 2014 Western Conference Semifinals vs the Oklahoma City Thunder

- Most assists in a playoff run

- 134 by Chris Paul, 2013–14

- Most assists in the playoffs, all-time

- 462 by Chris Paul

- Most blocks in a playoff game

- 6 by Gar Heard in Game 6 of the 1974 Eastern Conference Semifinals vs the Boston Celtics

- Most blocks in a playoff run

- 33 by DeAndre Jordan in 2014–15 and 2013–14

- Most blocks in the playoffs, all-time

- 116 by DeAndre Jordan

- Most steals in a playoff game

- 6 by Jamal Crawford vs the Houston Rockets on May 8, 2015
- 6 by Ron Harper vs the Houston Rockets on May 8, 1993

- Most steals in a playoff run

- 37 by Chris Paul, 2013–14

- Most steals in the playoffs, all-time

- 121 by Chris Paul

== Franchise team records for regular season ==
Regular season wins
Wins	Season
Most wins
57	2013–14
Most home wins
34	2013–14
Most road wins
26	2014–15

- Longest winning streak

- 17 from November 28, 2012 to January 1, 2013; 2012–13
- 17 from March 29, 2017 to October 28, 2017; 2016–17 and 2017–18

- Longest losing streak

- 19 from December 30, 1988 to February 8, 1989; 1988–89
- 19 from March 11, 1982 to April 15, 1982; 1981–82

- Most points in a game

- 175 vs the Sacramento Kings on February 24, 2023

- Largest comeback

- 35 points vs the Washington Wizards on January 25, 2022

- Largest lead blown entering the 4th quarter

- 21 points vs the Los Angeles Lakers on February 28, 2024

== Franchise team records for playoffs ==
- Most points in a game, playoffs

- 154 in Game 5 of the 2020 First Round vs the Dallas Mavericks on August 25, 2020

- Largest comeback, playoffs

- 31 vs the Golden State Warriors on April 15, 2019

== Franchise Championships ==
Championships
Championships	Season
NBA championships
0	-
Conference championships
0	-
Division championships
3	2013; 2014; 2024

== See also ==
- NBA records
