= Mazi Smith =

American football player (born 2001)

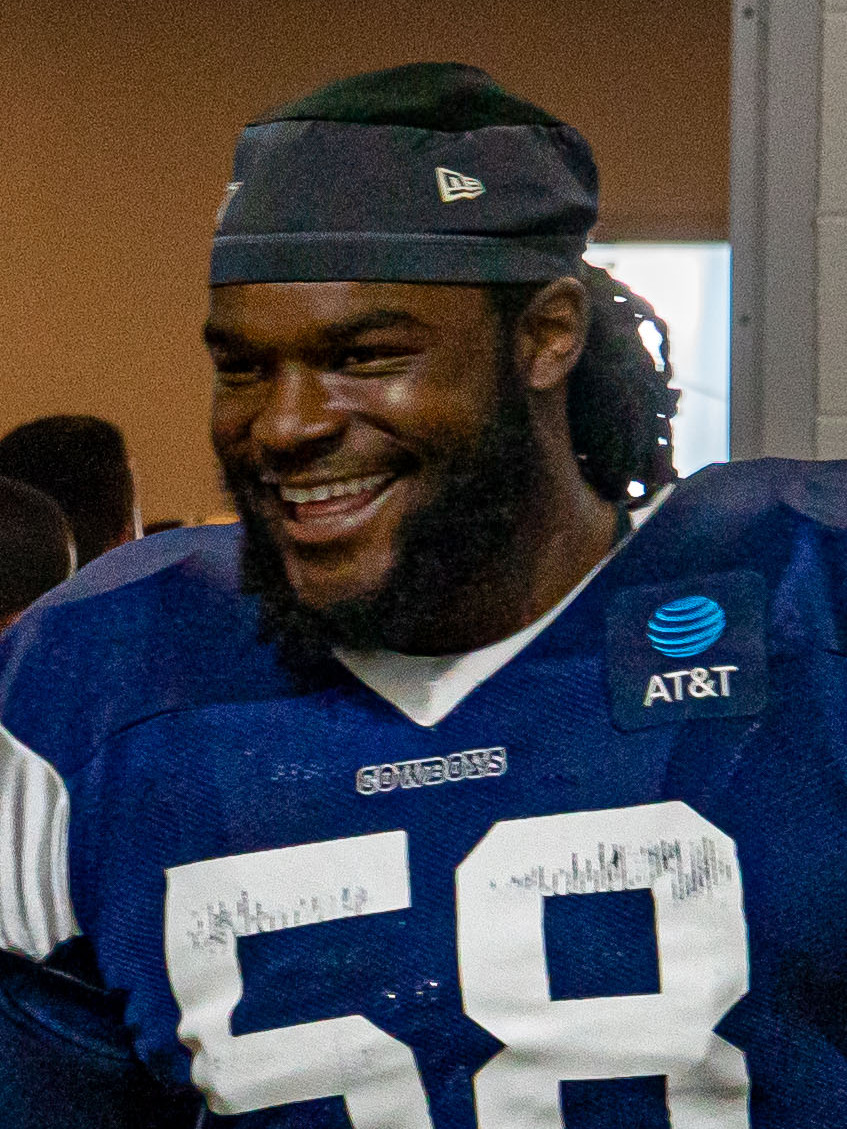
- Smith with the Dallas Cowboys in 2025

No. 63 – Green Bay Packers
- Position: Defensive tackle
- Roster status: Practice squad

Personal information
- Born: June 16, 2001 (age 25); Grand Rapids, Michigan, U.S.
- Listed height: 6 ft 3 in (1.91 m)
- Listed weight: 319 lb (145 kg)

Career information
- High school: East Kentwood (Kentwood, Michigan)
- College: Michigan (2019–2022)
- NFL draft: 2023: 1st round, 26th overall pick

Career history
- Dallas Cowboys (2023–2025); New York Jets (2025); Miami Dolphins (2026); Green Bay Packers (2026–present)*
- * Offseason or practice squad member only

Awards and highlights
- First-team All-Big Ten (2022)

Career NFL statistics as of Week 10, 2026
- Total tackles: 57
- Sacks: 2.0
- Stats at Pro Football Reference

Mazi Smith (born June 16, 2001) is an American professional football defensive tackle for the Green Bay Packers of the National Football League (NFL). He played college football for the Michigan Wolverines and was selected by the Dallas Cowboys in the first round of the 2023 NFL draft. He has also played for the New York Jets and Miami Dolphins.

== Early life ==
Smith attended East Kentwood High School in Kentwood, Michigan.

As a senior, he was a starter at nose guard, collecting 81 tackles (18 for loss) and 3 forced fumbles. He contributed to the team winning the Ottawa Kent Conference Red Division title and reaching the state quarterfinals. He received All-Area and All-State honors. He was rated by ESPN as the No. 38 recruit in the Class of 2019 and the year's second-best defensive tackle.

== College career ==
Smith accepted a football scholarship from the University of Michigan. As a freshman in 2019, he appeared in only 2 games and did not record any stat, which allowed the coaching staff to preserve his redshirt year under NCAA rules, giving him an extra year of future eligibility.

As a sophomore in 2020, the football season was reduced to 6 games due to the COVID-19 pandemic. He appeared in five games as a backup player and made 3 tackles (one for loss).

As a junior in 2021, he had a break out season, starting all 14 games along the defensive line. He registered 37 tackles (2.5 for loss), 4 quarterback hurries and 4 pass breakups. In the sixth game against the University of Nebraska, he had a career-high six tackles (three solo) and also tallied a quarterback hurry. In the eleventh game against the University of Maryland, he made 5 solo tackles.

As a senior in 2022, he started all 14 games at nose tackle. He registered 48 tackles (2.5 for loss), a share of a sack, one quarterback hurry and one forced fumble which he recovered. In the season opener against Colorado State University, he made 6 tackles (two solo) and one sack. In the fourth game against the University of Maryland, he had a career-high 8 tackles, including one for loss. He was also credited with being the vocal leader of the defense. At the end of the season, he was selected as a first-team player on the 2022 All-Big Ten Conference football team. In August 2022, Bruce Feldman of The Athletic rated Smith as the top-ranked player on his annual list of college football "freaks". Feldman cited Smith's size (over 325 pounds), speed (shuttle time of 4.41 seconds and three-cone drill time of 6.94 seconds), and his "rare power and agility". Feldman called Smith "so rare, in fact, it's hard to find the right superlative to begin with."

== Professional career ==
Pre-draft measurables
Height	Weight	Arm length	Hand span	Wingspan	Vertical jump	Broad jump	Bench press
6 ft 3 in (1.91 m)	323 lb (147 kg)	33 3/4 in (0.86 m)	9 3/4 in (0.25 m)	6 ft 8 7/8 in (2.05 m)	29.5 in (0.75 m)	8 ft 11 in (2.72 m)	34 reps
All values from NFL Combine/Pro Day

=== Dallas Cowboys ===
Smith was selected in the first round (26th overall) of the 2023 NFL draft, which was the first defensive tackle taken by the Dallas Cowboys in the first round since Russell Maryland in 1991. He was acquired to be a plug-and-play option at nose tackle and to contribute to improve the team's rushing defense. As a rookie, it was reported that he was asked to cut his weight down under 300 pounds to alternate between the 1-technique and 3-technique positions. He appeared in all 17 games with 3 starts and played only 304 snaps, while registering 15 tackles (2 for loss), one sack and 5 quarterback pressures. In the season opener against the New York Giants, he had 2 tackles (one for loss) and one quarterback pressure, contributing to a 40-0 victory. In Week 10 against the New York Giants, he had 3 tackles (one for loss) and one quarterback pressure.

In 2024, the Cowboys hired defensive coordinator Mike Zimmer, to replace Dan Quinn who left to become the head coach of the Washington Commanders. Smith was allowed to return to a weight that felt comfortable to him, in order to play primarily at the 1-technique position. He started all 17 games, posting a career-high 44 tackles (4 for loss), one sack and 4 quarterback pressures. In Week 4 against the New York Giants, he had 4 tackles (one for loss) and one quarterback pressure. In Week 11 against the Houston Texans, he made a career-high 5 tackles.

In 2025, the Cowboys hired defensive coordinator Matt Eberflus. Smith was asked once again to lose weight to be able to play multiple positions along the defensive line. He wound up losing playing time to Kenny Clark, Solomon Thomas and rookie Jay Toia. He appeared in 5 games as a backup, had 3 tackles and was declared inactive in 3 contests.

During his time with the Cowboys, Smith failed to produce relative to his first-round billing, often struggled and underperformed on the field. He also labored with significant weight changes throughout three seasons, both losing and gaining 30–40 pounds under changing defensive coordinators and defensive schemes.

=== New York Jets ===
On November 4, 2025, the Cowboys traded Smith along with a 2026 second round pick (#44-Derrick Moore) and a conditional 2027 first round pick (higher of theirs or the Green Bay Packers) to the New York Jets in exchange for defensive tackle, Quinnen Williams. In retrospect, Smith was not an important piece of the trade, failing to become part of a weak defensive line rotation. He appeared in only 3 games (54 snaps) as a backup, while making 3 tackles.

On April 29, 2026, the Jets declined the fifth-year option on Smith's contract, making him a free agent after the season. He couldn't crack the team's defensive-line rotation during preseason, despite receiving plenty of opportunities. Smith was released by the Jets on August 30.

=== Miami Dolphins ===
On September 1, 2026, Smith signed with the Miami Dolphins' practice squad. On October 13, he was released.

=== Green Bay Packers ===
On October 20, 2026, Smith signed with the Green Bay Packers practice squad.

=== NFL career statistics ===
Legend
**Bold**	Career high

Year	Team	Games		Tackles						Interceptions						Fumbles	
Year	Team	GP	GS	Comb	Solo	Ast	Sck	TFL	SFTY	PD	Int	Yds	Avg	Lng	TD	FF	FR
2023	DAL	16	3	13	9	4	**1.0**	3	0	0	0	0	0	0	0	0	0
2024	DAL	**17**	**17**	**41**	**22**	**19**	1.0	**4**	0	0	0	0	0	0	0	0	0
2025	DAL	5	0	3	0	3	0.0	0	0	0	0	0	0	0	0	0	0
2025	NYJ	3	0	0	0	0	0.0	0	0	0	0	0	0	0	0	0	0
2026	MIA	1	0	0	0	0	0.0	0	0	0	0	0	0	0	0	0	0
Career		43	20	57	31	26	2.0	7	0	0	0	0	0.0	0	0	0	0

== Personal life ==
Smith is of Nigerian descent. His cousin T. J. Duckett played running back in the NFL, and his second cousin was NBA Analyst Sekou Smith.

On October 7, 2022, Smith was stopped for speeding by police in Ann Arbor and was arrested after a gun was found in his possession without a concealed pistol license (CPL). Two months after his arrest, he was charged with carrying a concealed weapon, a felony. That count was dismissed on December 8, 2022, during a hearing as part of his guilty plea on the lesser charge of a loaded firearm in a motor vehicle.
