= Kentwood Public Schools =

School district in Michigan

Address
- 5820 Eastern Ave. Kentwood, Kent, Michigan, 49508; United States

District information
- Grades: Pre-Kindergarten-12
- Established: 1958
- Superintendent: Kevin Polston
- Schools: 16
- Budget: $187,203,000 2022-2023 expenditures
- NCES District ID: 2620340

Students and staff
- Students: 9,631 (2024-2025)
- Teachers: 556.95 (on an FTE basis) (2024-2025)
- Staff: 1,369.37 FTE (2024-2025)
- Student–teacher ratio: 16.99 (2024-2025)

Other information
- Website: www.kentwoodps.org

Kentwood Public Schools is a public school district in the Grand Rapids, Michigan area. It serves parts of Kentwood, Cutlerville, Gaines Township, Grand Rapids, and Wyoming.

== History ==
In 1958, six primary school districts southwest of Grand Rapids consolidated to form Kentwood Public Schools. The district's first high school was built in 1960 on the current site of Crestwood Middle School. By 1968, the present high school, East Kentwood High School, was under construction and West Kentwood High School was being planned for the same site. Only East Kentwood ended up being built. It opened in fall 1970. The Freshman Campus opened in fall 1994.

== Schools ==
Schools Kentwood Public Schools district
School	Address	Notes
Early Childhood Main Campus	200 60th St., Kentwood	Preschool. Opened fall 2024.
Bowen Elementary	4483 Kalamazoo Ave, Kentwood	Grades K-5
Brookwood Elementary	5465 Kalamazoo Ave, Kentwood	Grades K-5
Challenger Elementary	2475 52nd St, Kentwood	Grades K-5
Discovery Elementary	2461 60th St., Kentwood	Grades K-5
Endeavor Elementary	5757 East Paris Ave., Kentwood	Grades K-5
Explorer Elementary	2307 68th St., Caledonia	Grades PreK-5
Glenwood Elementary	912 Silverleaf, Kentwood	Grades K-5
Hamilton Elementary	3303 Breton Road SE, Grand Rapids	Grades PreK-5. Opening fall 2025.
Meadowlawn Elementary	4939 Burgis Ave., Kentwood	Grades K-5
Southwood Elementary	630 66th St., Kentwood	Grades K-5
Townline Elementary	100 60th St., Kentwood	Grades K-5
Crestwood Middle School	2674 44th St., Kentwood	Grades 6–8
Pinewood Middle School	2100 60th St., Kentwood	Grades 6–8
Valleywood Middle School	1110 50th St., Kentwood	Grades 6–8
Freshman Campus	6170 Valley Lane, Kentwood	Grade 9
East Kentwood High School	6230 Kalamazoo Ave., Kentwood	Grades 10–12
Crossroads High School	28 60th St., Kentwood	Alternative high school. Grades 9–12
