= Loy Vaught =

American basketball player (born 1968)

Personal information
- Born: February 27, 1968 (age 58) Grand Rapids, Michigan, U.S.
- Listed height: 6 ft 9 in (2.06 m)
- Listed weight: 230 lb (104 kg)

Career information
- High school: East Kentwood (Kentwood, Michigan)
- College: Michigan (1986–1990)
- NBA draft: 1990: 1st round, 13th overall pick
- Drafted by: Los Angeles Clippers
- Playing career: 1990–2001
- Position: Power forward / small forward
- Number: 35

Career history
- 1990–1998: Los Angeles Clippers
- 1999–2000: Detroit Pistons
- 2000–2001: Dallas Mavericks
- 2001: Washington Wizards

Career highlights
- NCAA champion (1989)

Career NBA statistics
- Points: 6,984 (10.1 ppg)
- Assists: 652 (0.9 apg)
- Rebounds: 4,881 (7.1 rpg)
- Stats at NBA.com
- Stats at Basketball Reference

Loy Stephen Vaught (born February 27, 1968) is an American former professional basketball player who spent ten seasons in the National Basketball Association (NBA), primarily with the Los Angeles Clippers.

Vaught played at East Kentwood High School in Kentwood, Michigan, a suburb of Grand Rapids, and helped lead the University of Michigan Wolverines to the 1989 NCAA Men's Division I Basketball Championship.

Vaught was drafted in 1990 by the Los Angeles Clippers. For a short period in the mid-1990s, Vaught was one of the most consistent forwards in the league, averaging 16.2 points and approximately 10 rebounds per game while missing only four games between 1994 and 1997. On April 22, 1994, in a 127–122 loss to the Suns, Vaught scored 29 points and grabbed 11 rebounds. On February 9, 1995, he scored a career-best 33 points along grabbing 13 rebounds in a 122–107 win over the defending champion Houston Rockets. On December 16, 1996, he scored 17 points and grabbed 21 rebounds in a 122–121 victory over the Suns. That same season, Vaught led an undermanned Clippers team to the playoffs as an 8 seed, where they were swept by NBA MVP Karl Malone and the Utah Jazz in the first round.

Injuries sustained in 1997 hampered his career, and after that his play sharply decreased in quality and he never played more than 51 games in a season again.

Vaught closed out his career with a series of stints with the Detroit Pistons, Dallas Mavericks, and Washington Wizards. He had a well earned reputation as an outstanding rebounder in his prime (especially on the defensive end of the court). He finished twice among the top ten overall and top ten defensive rebounders in the league.

Loy Vaught lives in Los Angeles. He has two daughters, Lexi and Maya.

== NBA career statistics ==
Legend
GP	Games played	GS	Games started	MPG	Minutes per game
FG%	Field goal percentage	3P%	3-point field goal percentage	FT%	Free throw percentage
RPG	Rebounds per game	APG	Assists per game	SPG	Steals per game
BPG	Blocks per game	PPG	Points per game	**Bold**	Career high
*	Led the league

=== Regular season ===
Year	Team	GP	GS	MPG	FG%	3P%	FT%	RPG	APG	SPG	BPG	PPG
1990–91	L.A. Clippers	73	0	16.1	.487	.000	.662	4.8	.5	.3	.3	5.5
1991–92	L.A. Clippers	79	38	21.4	.492	**.800**	.797	6.5	.9	.5	.4	7.6
1992–93	L.A. Clippers	79	4	20.9	.508	.250	.748	6.2	.7	.7	**.5**	9.4
1993–94	L.A. Clippers	75	56	28.2	**.537**	.000	.720	8.7	1.0	1.0	.3	11.7
1994–95	L.A. Clippers	80	79	**37.1**	.514	.212	.710	9.7	**1.7**	**1.3**	.4	**17.5**
1995–96	L.A. Clippers	80	78	**37.1**	.525	.368	.727	**10.1**	1.4	1.1	**.5**	16.2
1996–97	L.A. Clippers	**82**	**82***	34.6	.500	.167	.702	10.0	1.3	1.0	.3	14.9
1997–98	L.A. Clippers	10	6	26.5	.429	.000	.375	6.5	.7	.4	.2	7.5
1998–99	Detroit	37	10	13.0	.381	.000	.643	3.9	.3	.4	.2	3.4
1999–00	Detroit	43	0	6.8	.360	.000	.688	2.1	.3	.1	.1	1.7
2000–01	Dallas	37	1	10.6	.455	–	.667	3.3	.4	.4	.1	3.1
2000–01	Washington	14	0	11.2	.521	–	**1.000**	3.6	.5	.4	.1	3.9
Career		689	354	24.7	.504	.244	.718	7.1	.9	.7	.3	10.1

=== Playoffs ===
Year	Team	GP	GS	MPG	FG%	3P%	FT%	RPG	APG	SPG	BPG	PPG
1992	L.A. Clippers	**5**	0	7.2	**.636**	**1.000**	**1.000**	2.4	**.8**	.2	.2	3.4
1997	L.A. Clippers	3	**3**	**30.0**	.613	.333	.667	**9.0**	.7	**1.0**	**.7**	**15.0**
1999	Detroit	2	0	7.5	.500	–	–	.5	.0	.5	.0	2.0
2000	Detroit	2	0	8.0	.000	–	–	3.0	.0	**1.0**	.0	.0
Career		12	3	13.1	.571	.500	.727	3.8	.5	.6	.3	5.5
