= Kentwood, Michigan =

City in Michigan, United States

- City
- City of Kentwood
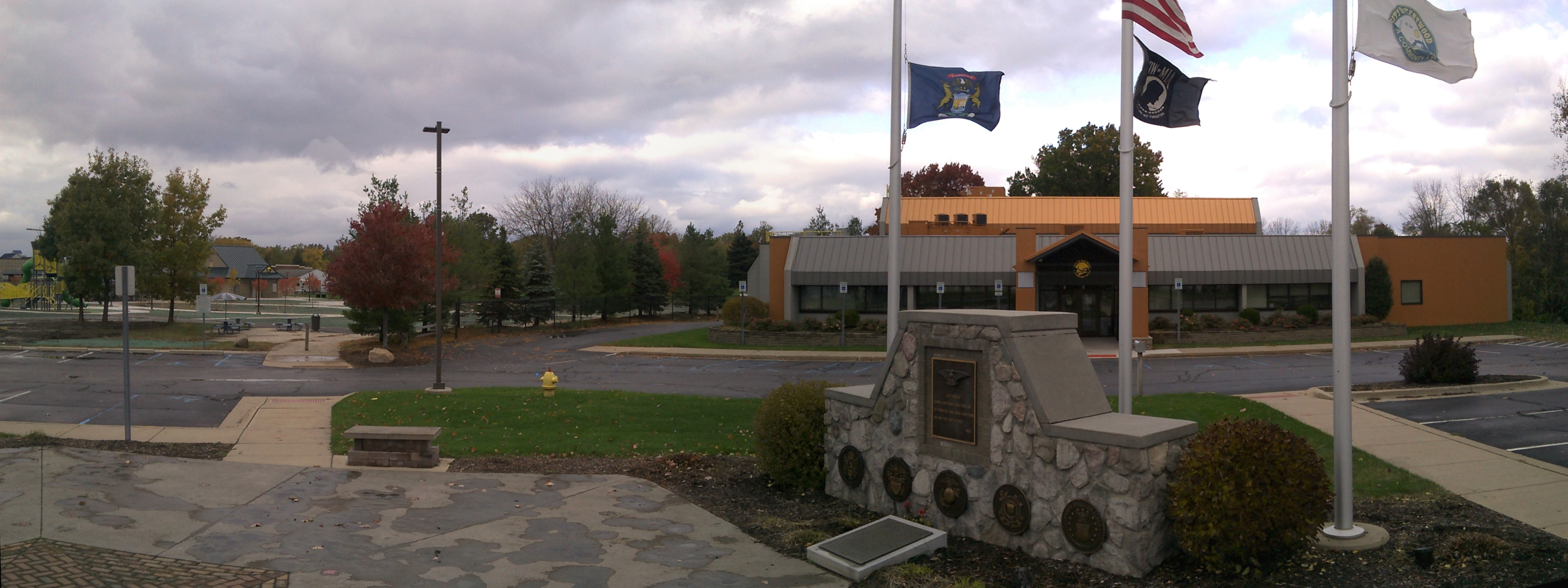
- Veterans Memorial Park

- Flag Seal

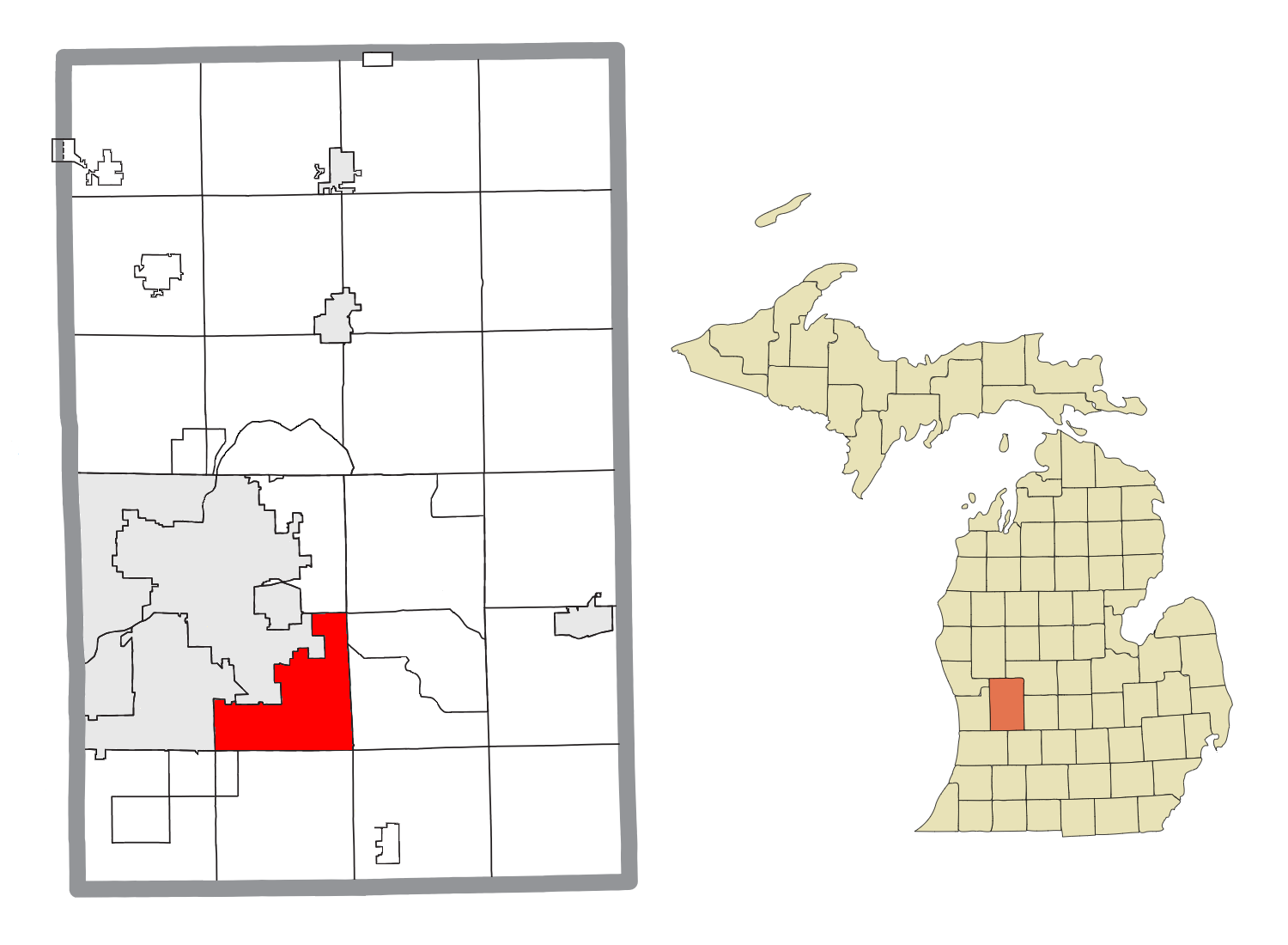
- Location within Kent County

- Location within the state of Michigan Location within the United States
- Coordinates: 42°52′48″N 85°38′46″W
- Country: United States
- State: Michigan
- County: Kent
- Incorporated: 1967

Government
  - Type: City commission
  - Mayor: Stephen Kepley
  - Clerk: Ana Jose
  - Deputy City Administrator: Shay Gallagher

Area
  - Total: 20.97 sq mi (54.30 km^{2})
  - Land: 20.92 sq mi (54.17 km^{2})
  - Water: 0.050 sq mi (0.13 km^{2})
- Elevation: 738 ft (225 m)

Population (2020)
  - Total: 54,304
  - Density: 2,596/sq mi (1,002.5/km^{2})
- Time zone: UTC-5 (EST)
  - Summer (DST): UTC-4 (EDT)
- ZIP code(s): 49508, 49512, 49548; 49546 (Grand Rapids)
- Area code: 616
- FIPS code: 26-42820
- GNIS feature ID: 1626558
- Website: Official website

Kentwood is a city in Kent County in the U.S. state of Michigan. The population was 54,304 as of the 2020 census. The city is bordered on the northwest by Grand Rapids and is the third most-populated municipality in the Grand Rapids metropolitan area.

== History ==
The city was incorporated in 1967 from what remained of Paris Township to prevent further annexation of land from the adjacent cities of Grand Rapids and Wyoming. The city is located in Kent County, which was named after jurist James Kent. The City of Kentwood was incorporated on its third try to avoid losing land to the nearby City of Grand Rapids which had annexed several key properties before then. After considering several options, the City of Kentwood was given that name because the driving force behind incorporation, first Mayor Peter M. Lamberts, decided to name it after the largest public school system in the area, the Kentwood Public Schools. Other names under consideration were Plaster Creek, for the largest river/creek that flowed through the area, and Paris, as the city was incorporated from Paris Township, but there was another Paris, Michigan, an unincorporated community in the center of the state, and that name was nixed to avoid confusion.

The city's first mayor was Peter M. Lamberts, who served in that post for its first 12 years, from 1967 until 1979. Subsequent mayors have included Marvin Hoeflinger (1979–1981), Gerald DeRuiter (1981–1992), Bill Hardiman (1992–2002), Richard Root (2002–2012), Richard Clanton (2012–2013), and Stephen Kepley (2013–present).

=== Kentwood Mine ===
The Kentwood Mine, located at 42.890°N 85.579°W, opened in 1971 and closed in 2000; it was a gypsum mine operated by Georgia-Pacific.

== Geography ==
According to the United States Census Bureau, the city has a total area of 20.95 square miles (54.26 km^{2}), of which, 20.90 square miles (54.13 km^{2}) is land and 0.05 square miles (0.13 km^{2}) is water. The city is bordered by Wyoming to the west, Grand Rapids and Grand Rapids Township to the north, Cascade Township to the east, and Gaines Township to the south.

=== Major highways ===
- I-96 passes through the northeast corner of the city.
- M-11 runs along 28th Street.
- M-37 runs along East Beltline Avenue and Broadmoor Avenue to the south.
- M-6 runs through the southern part of the city, connecting I-196 near Hudsonville to I-96 near Gerald R. Ford International Airport.

=== Trails ===
Kentwood has two trails:

- Paul Henry Rail Trail from 44th Street and Kalamazoo to 60th Street and Wing Avenue
- East-West Trail from Division Avenue to Breton Avenue

=== Climate ===
The Köppen Climate Classification subtype for this climate is "Dfb" (Warm Summer Continental Climate).

Climate data for Kentwood, Michigan
Month	Jan	Feb	Mar	Apr	May	Jun	Jul	Aug	Sep	Oct	Nov	Dec	Year
Mean daily maximum °C (°F)	−1 (30)	0 (32)	5 (41)	13 (55)	20 (68)	25 (77)	28 (82)	27 (80)	22 (71)	16 (60)	7 (44)	1 (33)	14 (56)
Mean daily minimum °C (°F)	−9 (15)	−8 (17)	−3 (26)	2 (35)	7 (44)	13 (55)	15 (59)	14 (57)	10 (50)	4 (39)	0 (32)	−5 (23)	3 (38)
Average precipitation mm (inches)	56 (2.2)	46 (1.8)	64 (2.5)	76 (3.0)	84 (3.3)	91 (3.6)	76 (3.0)	74 (2.9)	91 (3.6)	71 (2.8)	71 (2.8)	61 (2.4)	861 (33.9)
Source: Weatherbase

== Demographics ==
Historical population
Census	Pop.	Note	%±
1970	20,310		—
1980	30,438		49.9%
1990	37,826		24.3%
2000	45,255		19.6%
2010	48,707		7.6%
2020	54,304		11.5%
2023 (est.)	53,987		−0.6%
U.S. Decennial Census

=== 2020 census ===
As of the 2020 census, Kentwood had a population of 54,304. The median age was 35.2 years. 24.0% of residents were under the age of 18 and 14.3% of residents were 65 years of age or older. For every 100 females there were 93.6 males, and for every 100 females age 18 and over there were 90.0 males age 18 and over.

100.0% of residents lived in urban areas, while 0.0% lived in rural areas.

There were 21,337 households in Kentwood, of which 30.8% had children under the age of 18 living in them. Of all households, 43.7% were married-couple households, 18.5% were households with a male householder and no spouse or partner present, and 30.9% were households with a female householder and no spouse or partner present. About 29.9% of all households were made up of individuals and 11.3% had someone living alone who was 65 years of age or older.

There were 22,269 housing units, of which 4.2% were vacant. The homeowner vacancy rate was 0.9% and the rental vacancy rate was 5.7%.

Racial composition as of the 2020 census
Race	Number	Percent
White	30,333	55.9%
Black or African American	10,518	19.4%
American Indian and Alaska Native	358	0.7%
Asian	6,148	11.3%
Native Hawaiian and Other Pacific Islander	10	0.0%
Some other race	2,794	5.1%
Two or more races	4,143	7.6%
Hispanic or Latino (of any race)	5,897	10.9%

=== 2010 census ===
As of the census of 2010, there were 48,707 people, 19,741 households, and 12,345 families residing in the city. The population density was 2,330.5 inhabitants per square mile (899.8/km^{2}). There were 21,584 housing units at an average density of 1,032.7 per square mile (398.7/km^{2}). The racial makeup of the city was 70.1% White, 15.4% African American, 0.4% Native American, 6.6% Asian, 0.1% Pacific Islander, 3.5% from other races, and 3.9% from two or more races. Hispanic or Latino people of any race were 8.5% of the population.

There were 19,741 households, of which 32.9% had children under the age of 18 living with them, 45.3% were married couples living together, 13.1% had a female householder with no husband present, 4.1% had a male householder with no wife present, and 37.5% were non-families. 30.9% of all households were made up of individuals, and 10.3% had someone living alone who was 65 years of age or older. The average household size was 2.45 and the average family size was 3.10.

The median age in the city was 34.3 years. 25.4% of residents were under the age of 18; 9.8% were between the ages of 18 and 24; 28.8% were from 25 to 44; 24.3% were from 45 to 64; and 11.5% were 65 years of age or older. The gender makeup of the city was 48.0% male and 52.0% female.

=== 2000 census ===
As of the 2000 census, there were 45,255 people, 18,477 households, and 11,529 families residing in the city. The population density was 830.5/km^{2} (2,150.6/mi^{2}). There were 19,507 housing units at an average density of 358.0/km^{2} (927.0/mi^{2}). The racial makeup of the city was 80.87% White, 9.09% African American, 0.46% Native American, 5.63% Asian, 0.04% Pacific Islander, 1.42% from other races, and 2.48% from two or more races. Hispanic or Latino of any race were 3.88% of the population.

There were 18,477 households, out of which 33.3% had children under the age of 18 living with them, 48.3% were married couples living together, 10.8% had a female householder with no husband present, and 37.6% were non-families. 30.9% of all households were made up of individuals, and 8.2% had someone living alone who was 65 years of age or older. The average household size was 2.43 and the average family size was 3.10.

In the city the population was spread out, with 26.6% under the age of 18, 10.4% from 18 to 24, 33.7% from 25 to 44, 19.5% from 45 to 64, and 9.8% who were 65 years of age or older. The median age was 32 years. For every 100 females there were 93.2 males. For every 100 females age 18 and over, there were 89.4 males.

The median income for a household in the city was $45,812, and the median income for a family was $55,615. Males had a median income of $40,544 versus $27,632 for females. The per capita income for the city was $22,463. About 5.0% of families and 6.3% of the population were below the poverty line, including 8.4% of those under age 18 and 6.0% of those age 65 or over.

== Government ==
Kentwood has a mayor, who also serves as the city manager, and a legislature consisting of a city commission. The current mayor is Stephen Kepley. The mayor pro tempore is selected by the city commission; Ward 1 Commissioner Robert Coughlin currently serves in this role. The mayor serves as a voting member of the city commission and presides over commission meetings. However, he does not have the power to veto a resolution or ordinance.

Voters in Kentwood elect a mayor, city clerk, and city treasurer to four-year terms, and elect six city commissioners to four-year, staggered terms. Every two years, voters in each of the city's two wards elect one commissioner, while another city commissioner is elected by the city at-large.

== Education ==
=== Library ===
Kentwood is located within the Kent District Library district. The Kentwood Branch Library opened in 2010 on Breton Avenue, next to Kentwood City Hall. Mayor Stephen Kepley, who at the time was the City Engineer, was the project manager for the new library. The library was named the Richard L. Root Library after Kentwood's fifth mayor, who led the city commission and residents in approving a dedicated millage for its construction.

The library is located next to an old landfill that received federal funds to make it one of the many superfund sites in the United States. The Environmental Protection Agency and Kent County installed a methane flare to burn excess methane from the decaying landfill in 2015. Previously, the Kentwood Library had been located on Kalamazoo Avenue south of 44th Street, on property donated by the Bowen/Stauffer family.

=== Public schools ===
The main public school district in Kentwood is Kentwood Public Schools, consisting of one high school, one freshman campus, three middle schools, ten active elementary schools, and one closed elementary school which has become home to the early childhood programs:

- East Kentwood High School
- Crossroads Alternative High School
- East Kentwood Freshman Campus
- Crestwood Middle School
- Pinewood Middle School
- Valleywood Middle School
- Bowen Elementary School
- Brookwood Elementary School
- Challenger Elementary School
- Discovery Elementary School
- Endeavor Elementary School
- Explorer Elementary School
- Glenwood Elementary School
- Meadowlawn Elementary School
- Southwood Elementary School
- Townline Elementary School
- Hamilton Early Childhood Center

Also included within Kentwood's city limits are the Forest Hills Public Schools and Kelloggsville Public Schools.

== Notable people ==
- Kristen Kish, season 10 winner and host of Top Chef
- Mike Knuble, former NHL hockey player
- Loy Vaught, former NBA basketball player
- Joe Warren, two-time Bellator world champion
- Mazi Smith, Defensive Tackle for Dallas Cowboys
