= DeAndre Jordan =

American basketball player (born 1988)

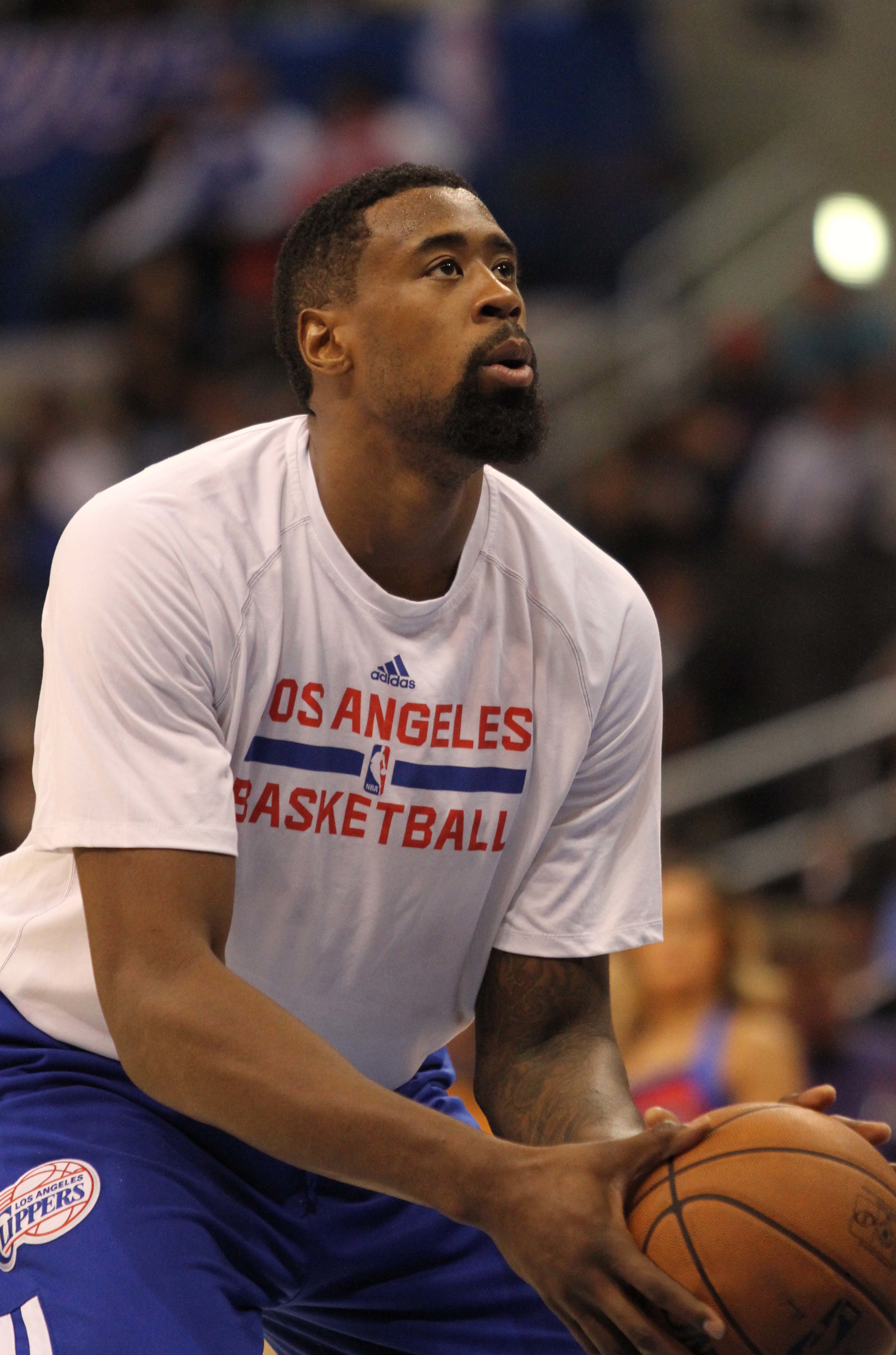
- Jordan with the Los Angeles Clippers in 2013

No. 6 – New Orleans Pelicans
- Position: Center
- League: NBA

Personal information
- Born: July 21, 1988 (age 38) Houston, Texas, U.S.
- Listed height: 6 ft 11 in (2.11 m)
- Listed weight: 280 lb (127 kg)

Career information
- High school: Episcopal (Bellaire, Texas); Christian Life Center Academy (Humble, Texas)
- College: Texas A&M (2007–2008)
- NBA draft: 2008: 2nd round, 35th overall pick
- Drafted by: Los Angeles Clippers
- Playing career: 2008–present

Career history
- 2008–2018: Los Angeles Clippers
- 2018–2019: Dallas Mavericks
- 2019: New York Knicks
- 2019–2021: Brooklyn Nets
- 2021–2022: Los Angeles Lakers
- 2022: Philadelphia 76ers
- 2022–2025: Denver Nuggets
- 2025–present: New Orleans Pelicans

Career highlights
- NBA champion (2023); NBA All-Star (2017); All-NBA First Team (2016); 2× All-NBA Third Team (2015, 2017); 2× NBA All-Defensive First Team (2015, 2016); 2× NBA rebounding leader (2014, 2015); Big 12 All-Rookie Team (2008); Third-team Parade All-American (2007)
- Stats at NBA.com
- Stats at Basketball Reference
Medals
Men's basketball
Representing the United States
Olympic Games
Gold medal – first place	2016 Rio de Janeiro	Team
U19 World Championship
Silver medal – second place	2007 Novi Sad

Hyland DeAndre Jordan Jr. (born July 21, 1988) is an American professional basketball player for the New Orleans Pelicans of the National Basketball Association (NBA). He played one season of college basketball for the Texas A&M Aggies.

Jordan was selected by the Los Angeles Clippers in the second round of the 2008 NBA draft with the 35th overall pick. He spent ten seasons with the Clippers before signing in free agency with the Dallas Mavericks in free agency in July 2018. He was traded to the New York Knicks in January 2019 and joined the Brooklyn Nets in July of the same year. He was dealt to the Detroit Pistons in September 2021 and reached a contract buyout agreement before signing with the Los Angeles Lakers in the same month. He was waived by the Lakers in March 2022 and subsequently joined the Philadelphia 76ers. He then signed with the Denver Nuggets in July 2022, with whom he won his first NBA championship in 2023.

Jordan is a three-time All-NBA and two-time NBA All-Defensive Team member, and has twice led the NBA in rebounding. In 2017, he was named an NBA All-Star for the first time. As of 2025, Jordan holds the NBA record for highest career regular season and postseason field goal percentage, at 67.4% and 67.0%, respectively. He is the Clippers' franchise leader in games played, rebounds, and blocks. He also won a gold medal at the 2016 Summer Olympics as a member of the U.S. Olympic team.

== High school career ==
Jordan attended Episcopal High School through his junior year. Jordan averaged 15.0 points, 12.0 rebounds, and 4.0 blocks as a sophomore; and 16.5 points, 14.0 rebounds, and 7.0 blocks as a junior. Jordan transferred to Christian Life Center Academy for his senior year, where he averaged 26.1 points, 15.2 rebounds, and 8.1 blocks per game. He was a third-team Parade All-American, named to the first-team All-Greater Houston squad by the Houston Chronicle and was a two-time all-state selection. At Christian Life Center, Jordan posted a career-high 37 points in a game and also set the school record for most blocks in a game with 20.

Coming out of high school, Jordan was rated as the number-eight overall prospect, the number-two center in the country, and the number-one prep player in Texas by Rivals.com. Jordan was recruited by Florida, Florida State, Indiana, Texas, Texas A&M, LSU, Kentucky, and others.

In the summer of 2007, Jordan played for Team USA at the 2007 Under-19 World Championships in Serbia. Jordan played only nine minutes per game. The team finished second with an 8–1 record.

== College career ==
Before Jordan arrived at Texas A&M University in College Station, Aggies head basketball coach Billy Gillispie left the school to take the head coaching position at Kentucky. Jordan chose to honor his commitment to the university.

Jordan started 21 of 35 games in his freshman season at Texas A&M. He averaged 20 minutes and 1.3 blocks per game. In those games, he shot a team-high of 61.7 percent in field goals, but a team-low of 43.7 percent in free throws. Most of his field goals, however, were within a few feet from the basket. He finished the season averaging 7.9 points and 6.0 rebounds. He made the Big 12 All-Rookie Team for his efforts. After the season, he declared for the 2008 NBA draft.

Prior to the draft, draftexpress.com, a third-party NBA draft website, listed Jordan's strengths and weaknesses. A few strengths include "incredible physical specimen", "defensive potential", "incredible upside", and "freakish athlete". Some weaknesses include "not productive", "poor fundamentals", "mediocre footwork", and "high bust potential". The website also projected him to be picked at No. 16 by the Philadelphia 76ers. Other mock drafts had him projected to be picked at No. 10 by the New Jersey Nets or at No. 11 by the Indiana Pacers due to his attractive ability to run the floor. ESPN's Chad Ford had him going to the Memphis Grizzlies at pick No. 28 in the first round.

== Professional career ==
=== Los Angeles Clippers (2008–2018) ===
==== Early years (2008–2013) ====
Jordan was selected with the 35th overall pick by the Los Angeles Clippers in the 2008 NBA draft. Due to injuries among the Clippers low-post players, Jordan was pushed into the starting lineup for the January 19, 2009 game against the Minnesota Timberwolves. In his first game as a starter, he recorded 8 points, 6 blocks and 10 rebounds in 34 minutes of play. In the January 21, 2009 game against the Los Angeles Lakers, he played 43 minutes and recorded a career-high 23 points. This included 10 dunks, which had only been accomplished by two others players (Dwight Howard and Shaquille O'Neal) over the past 10 NBA seasons.

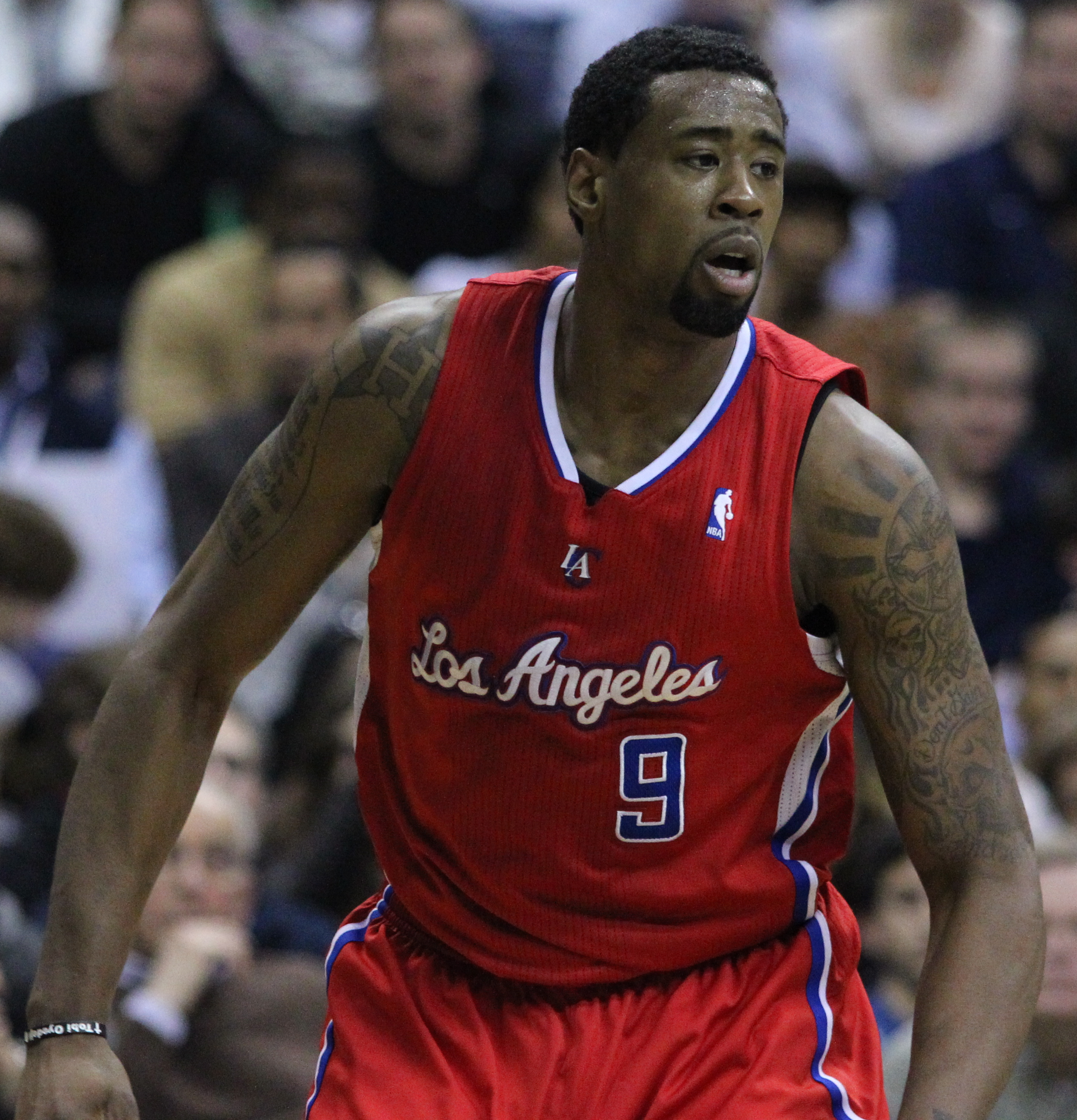
Jordan in 2011

On December 11, 2011, Jordan signed an offer sheet with the Golden State Warriors reportedly worth $43 million over four years. However, one day later, the Clippers matched the offer to keep him.

For the 2011–12 season, Jordan changed his jersey number from 9 to 6. On December 25, 2011, Jordan recorded a career-high eight blocks against the Golden State Warriors in an opening day 105–86 victory.

During the 2012–13 season, Jordan's free-throw percentage dropped from 52.5% to 38.6%, one of his career worsts. However, he led the league in field-goal percentage, shooting 64.3%. This was his first season playing all 82 games.

==== All-NBA and All-Defensive honors (2013–2016) ====
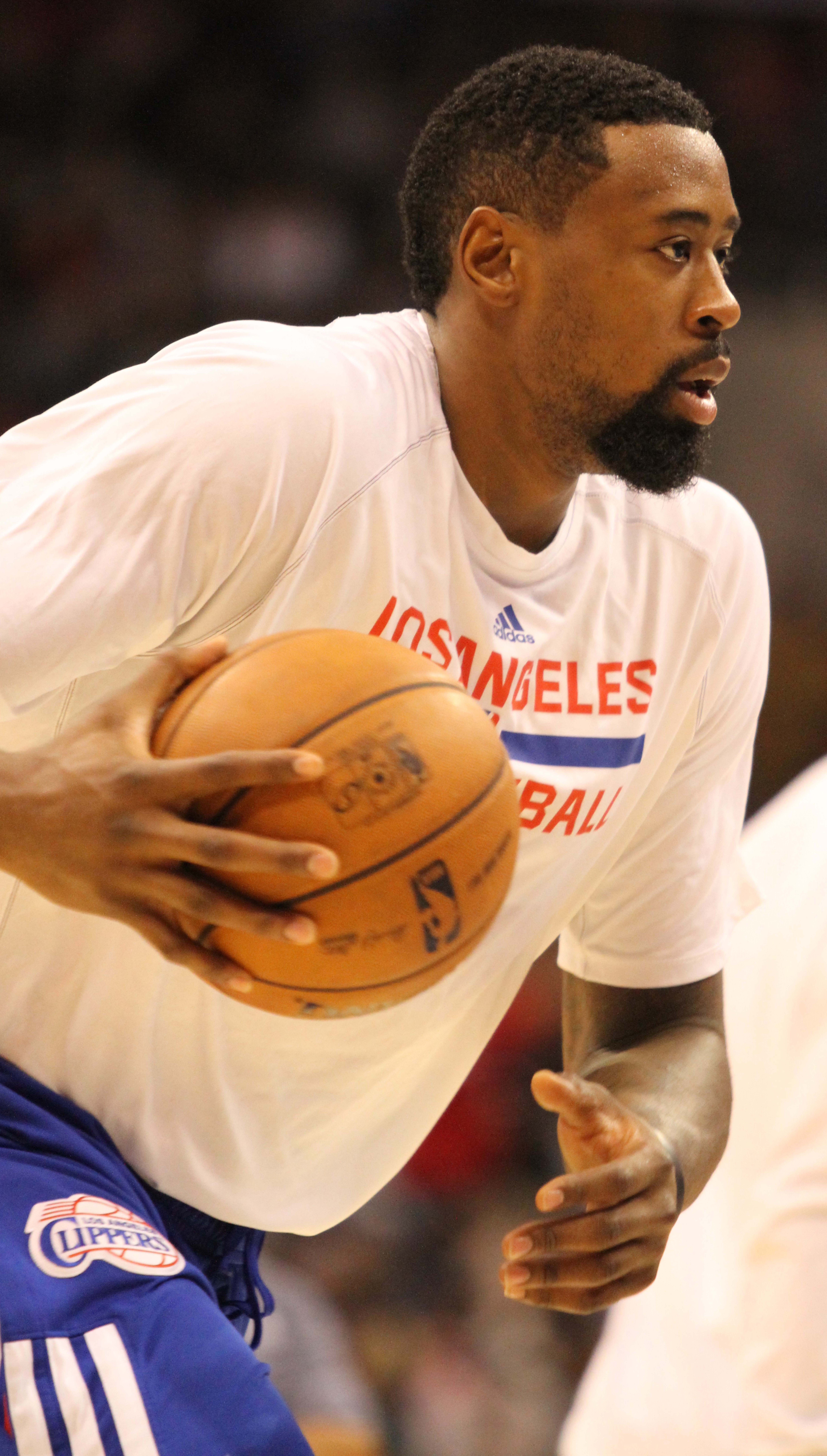
Jordan in 2013

In 2013, Jordan was selected to Team USA's minicamp in Las Vegas. On November 29, 2013, Jordan recorded a career-high nine blocks in the 104–98 victory against the Sacramento Kings. On January 3, 2014, Jordan scored a career-high 25 points in a 119–112 victory against the Dallas Mavericks. With 13.6 rebounds per game, he was the league's rebounding leader for the 2013–14 season.

On April 29, 2014, Jordan became the first NBA player with at least 25 points, 18 rebounds, and four blocked shots in a playoff game since Tim Duncan in 2008.

Blake Griffin and Jordan in 2013.

On February 9, 2015, Jordan recorded 22 points and a career-high 27 rebounds in the 115–98 win over the Dallas Mavericks. On March 13, in a 99–129 loss to the Dallas Mavericks, Jordan made his first career three-pointer early in the first quarter. On May 21, Jordan was named to the All-NBA third team. Jordan became the fifth player in NBA history to average at least 10 points, 15 rebounds, one steal, and two blocks during the regular season. The feat had last been accomplished by Moses Malone during the 1982–83 season.

Despite verbally agreeing to sign a four-year, $80 million contract with the Dallas Mavericks on July 3, 2015, Jordan began having second thoughts just days later, and on July 8, a number of Clippers personnel flew to Houston for a meeting with Jordan to convince him to back out of his Mavericks deal. Hours later, Jordan officially re-signed with the Clippers on a four-year, $88 million contract.

On November 4, 2015, with 13 rebounds against the Golden State Warriors, Jordan became the Clippers' all-time leader in total rebounds, surpassing former Clipper Elton Brand (4,710), finishing the game with 4,711 career rebounds. On November 30, he recorded 18 points and a season-high 24 rebounds against the Portland Trail Blazers, but he also missed 22 free throws (12-of-34) to tie Wilt Chamberlain's NBA record and set a franchise record with 34 attempts. On January 13, he was sidelined for the team's game against the Miami Heat because of pneumonia, ending the NBA's longest active consecutive games played streak at 360.

==== First All-Star selection and final years with Clippers (2016–2018) ====
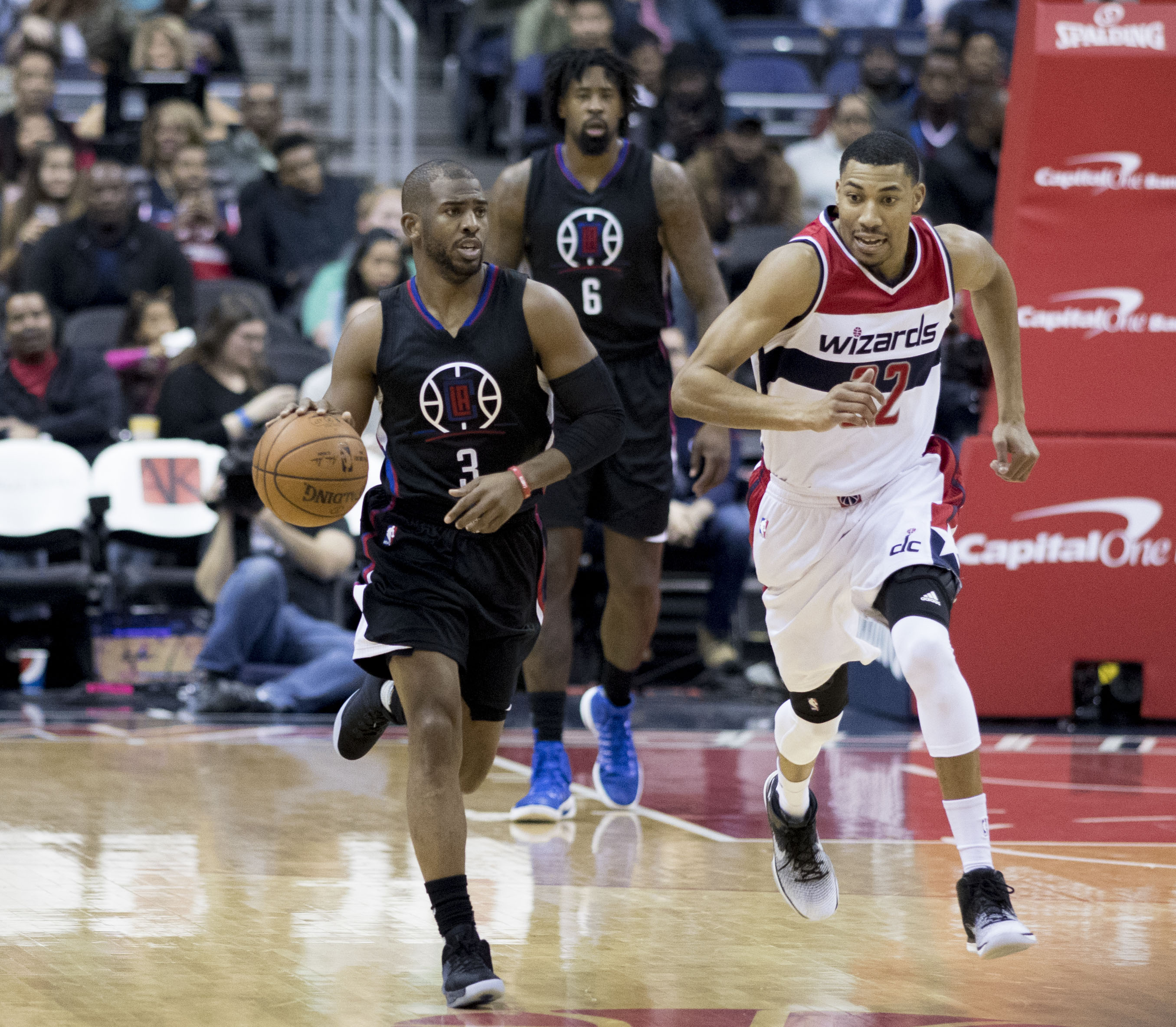
Jordan watching as Chris Paul runs the offense in 2016.

Jordan helped the Clippers record a league-best 7–1 record to start the 2016–17 season. He played his 600th career game on November 9 against the Portland Trail Blazers, joining Randy Smith (715) and Eric Piatkowski (616) as the only players in franchise history to do so. On December 28, he recorded 13 points and a season-high 25 rebounds in a 102–98 loss to the New Orleans Pelicans. On January 14, 2017, he recorded a season-high 24 points and 21 rebounds in a 113–97 win over the Los Angeles Lakers. He surpassed that mark on January 19 with a career-high 29 points in a 104–101 loss to the Minnesota Timberwolves. On January 26, he was named a Western Conference All-Star reserve for the 2017 NBA All-Star Game, marking the first All-Star selection of his career. During the All-Star Weekend festivities, Jordan participated in the Slam Dunk Contest, but failed to make it past the first round. He led the NBA in dunks for four consecutive years, between 2013-14 and 2016-17.

In the Clippers' season opener on October 19, 2017, Jordan had 14 points and 24 rebounds in a 108–92 win over the Los Angeles Lakers. On January 4, 2018, he recorded a then season-high 26 points and 17 rebounds in a 127–117 loss to the Oklahoma City Thunder. On January 24, 2018, in a 113–102 loss to the Boston Celtics, Jordan tied Randy Smith (715) for most games played in team history. Two days later, in a 109–100 win over the Memphis Grizzlies, Jordan played his 716th game as a Clipper, surpassing Smith's record. On February 14, 2018, Jordan scored a career-high 30 points to go with 13 rebounds and four steals in a 129–119 win over the Celtics. On March 9, 2018, he had 20 points and 23 rebounds in a 116–102 win over the Cleveland Cavaliers. Jordan averaged 17.1 rebounds in March 2018, just shy of his career high of 17.3 set in March 2015.

=== Dallas Mavericks (2018–2019) ===
On July 6, 2018, Jordan signed a one-year, $22.9 million deal with the Dallas Mavericks. To begin the season, Jordan had three straight double-doubles, becoming the first Dallas player since Popeye Jones in 1994 to start a season with three straight. On October 28, he recorded 12 points, 19 rebounds and a career-high nine assists in a 113–104 loss to the Utah Jazz, thus recording his sixth double-double in six games to start the season. On November 7, he had 11 points and 12 rebounds in a 117–102 loss to the Jazz, thus collecting at least 10 rebounds for a franchise record 11th straight game. On November 19, he recorded 17 points and a then season-high 20 rebounds in a 98–88 loss to the Memphis Grizzlies. On December 2, he recorded 16 points and a season-high 23 rebounds in a 114–110 win over the Los Angeles Clippers. On December 16, he tied his season high with 23 rebounds in a 120–113 loss to the Sacramento Kings. He had 23 rebounds again on December 22 against the Golden State Warriors.

=== New York Knicks (2019) ===
On January 31, 2019, Jordan was traded to the New York Knicks along with Dennis Smith Jr., Wesley Matthews and two future first round draft picks in exchange for Kristaps Porziņģis, Tim Hardaway Jr., Trey Burke and Courtney Lee. On March 15, he recorded 11 points, 13 rebounds and matched a career high with nine assists in a 109–83 loss to the San Antonio Spurs.

=== Brooklyn Nets (2019–2021) ===
==== Team stat leader (2019–2020) ====
On July 6, 2019, the Brooklyn Nets signed Jordan to a reported four-year contract worth $40 million. On October 23, he made his debut for the Nets, recording two points, three rebounds, and one assist in 17 minutes of play during a 127–126 overtime loss to the Minnesota Timberwolves. On November 2, he recorded his first double-double of the season, scoring 10 points and 10 rebounds in a 113–109 loss to the Detroit Pistons. On December 21, Jordan logged a season-high 20 rebounds along with 12 points and six assists in a 122–112 win over the Atlanta Hawks. On February 20, 2020, he logged his tenth double-double of the season, grabbing 14 points and 15 rebounds in a 112–104 overtime loss to the Philadelphia 76ers. On June 29, 2020, Jordan announced that he had tested positive for COVID-19 and decided to opt out of playing in the season restart. He finished the 2019–20 season with 13 double-doubles, which was his lowest total since the 2012–13 season. However, he led the Nets in both field goal percentage and rebounds per game.

==== Playoff absence (2020–2021) ====
Jordan made his season debut for the Nets on December 22, 2020, where he logged four points, 11 rebounds, and one assist in a 125–99 win over the Golden State Warriors. On January 18, 2021, he recorded his first double-double of the season, scoring 12 points and 12 rebounds in a 125–123 win over the Milwaukee Bucks. On March 13, he scored a season-high 14 points along with nine rebounds and one block in a 100–95 win over the Detroit Pistons. On April 14, Jordan recorded a season-high 14 rebounds in a 117–123 loss to the Philadelphia 76ers. He did not play in the Nets' final 16 games of the season, and he did not appear at all in the playoffs. Jordan finished the season with only 6 double-doubles, which was his second-lowest season total, only behind his rookie season in 2008–09.

Center LaMarcus Aldridge retired in April 2021, but was medically cleared in September to keep playing, making a return to the Nets for Jordan unlikely. The team re-signed Aldridge on September 3.

=== Los Angeles Lakers (2021–2022) ===
On September 3, 2021, Jordan was traded to the Detroit Pistons in exchange for Sekou Doumbouya and Jahlil Okafor, and he reached a buyout agreement with the team four days later. On September 9, Jordan signed with the Los Angeles Lakers. On March 1, 2022, he was waived by the Lakers.

=== Philadelphia 76ers (2022) ===
On March 3, 2022, Jordan signed with the Philadelphia 76ers, reuniting with former Clippers coach Doc Rivers and former Nets teammate James Harden.

=== Denver Nuggets (2022–2025) ===
On July 12, 2022, Jordan signed with the Denver Nuggets. On November 22, Jordan grabbed a season-high 17 rebounds during a 98–97 win over the Dallas Mavericks. The Nuggets defeated the Miami Heat in the NBA Finals in five games en route to his first NBA championship and the Nuggets’ first NBA championship in franchise history.

On July 21, 2023, Jordan re-signed with the Denver Nuggets. On November 27, Jordan had a season high in points, rebounds, and assists, scoring 21, 13, and 5 respectively. This performance helped lead the injured Nuggets to a 113–104 win over his former team the Los Angeles Clippers alongside a fellow former Clipper having a breakout game, Reggie Jackson.

On July 24, 2024, Jordan re-signed with the Nuggets. He made 56 appearances (including five starts) for Denver during the 2024–25 NBA season, averaging 3.7 points, 5.1 rebounds, and 0.9 assists.

=== New Orleans Pelicans (2025–present) ===
On October 24, 2025, Jordan signed a one-year, minimum-salary contract with the New Orleans Pelicans. He made 12 appearances (including seven starts) for New Orleans during the 2025–26 NBA season, recording averages of 4.4 points, 6.3 rebounds, and 0.9 assists. Following the season, Jordan was named as the recipient of the Teammate of the Year award.

On June 30, 2026, Jordan re-signed with the Pelicans on a one-year minimum contract.

== Personal life ==
Jordan is a Christian. Jordan prays frequently and has spoken about his faith saying, "I know my relationship with Christ, and I know what he has done for me, and that is what I live on." Jordan has a tattoo of Matthew 5:4–5 on his chest, a Christian cross on his left arm, the Serenity Prayer and his own message saying "I thank God for the gift that he has given me. I will honor, sacrifice, and dedicate myself to my talent. I know where I have come from but I know where I am going" on his right arm, and Philippians 4:13 with praying hands and "G.W.O.M" (God Watch Over Me) on his stomach.

Jordan is vegan for environmental reasons. He has hosted a vegan cooking show called Cooking Clean.

Since 2020, Jordan has been enrolled in the Contemplative Studies program at Brown University.

His younger brother, Avery Jordan, was a professional football player in the Canadian Football League.

== Player profile ==
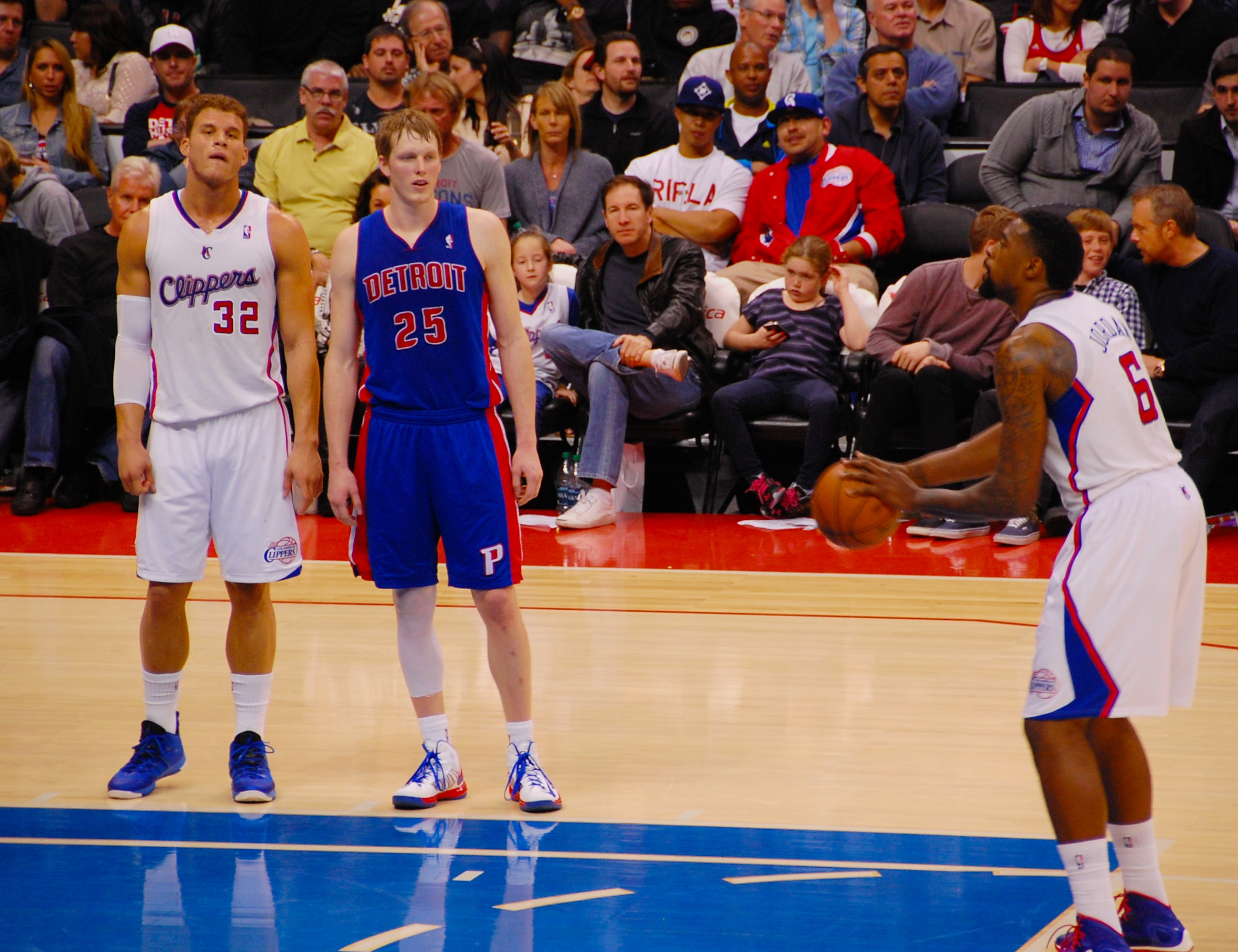
Jordan, a regular recipient of the Hack-a-Shaq strategy, about to take a free throw in 2013.

Jordan is a rebounder, averaging 10.2 rebounds per game in his career and leading the league in two seasons. He is also an post-defender averaging 1.5 blocks per game for his career. Jordan's defensive play was a mix of tactics from Bill Russell focused on blocking shots. On offense, he heavily relies on put-backs and alley-oops to score. He did lead the league in field goal percentage for five seasons. When it comes to being a free throw shooter, he makes just 47.5% of his shots at the line, leading to opponents exploiting this weakness by intentionally fouling him with the Hack-a-Shaq strategy. Jordan is considered one of the more durable players in the NBA, having played in 360 straight games at one point in his career.

== Awards and honors ==
NBA

- NBA champion (2023)
- NBA All-Star (2017)
- All-NBA First Team (2016)
- 2× All-NBA Third Team (2015, 2017)
- 2× NBA All-Defensive First Team (2015, 2016)
- 2× NBA rebounding leader (2014, 2015)
- 5× NBA field goal percentage leader (2013, 2014, 2015, 2016, 2017)
- Twyman–Stokes Teammate of the Year Award (2026)

College

- Big 12 All-Rookie Team (2008)
- Third-team Parade All-American (2007)

== Career statistics ==
Legend
GP	Games played	GS	Games started	MPG	Minutes per game
FG%	Field goal percentage	3P%	3-point field goal percentage	FT%	Free throw percentage
RPG	Rebounds per game	APG	Assists per game	SPG	Steals per game
BPG	Blocks per game	PPG	Points per game	**Bold**	Career high
†	Won an NBA championship	*	Led the league	‡	NBA record

=== NBA ===
==== Regular season ====
Year	Team	GP	GS	MPG	FG%	3P%	FT%	RPG	APG	SPG	BPG	PPG
2008–09	L.A. Clippers	53	13	14.6	.633	—	.385	4.5	.2	.2	1.1	4.3
2009–10	L.A. Clippers	70	12	16.2	.605	.000	.375	5.0	.3	.2	.9	4.8
2010–11	L.A. Clippers	80	66	25.6	.686	.000	.452	7.2	.5	.5	1.8	7.1
2011–12	L.A. Clippers	66*	66*	27.2	.632	.000	.525	8.3	.3	.5	2.0	7.4
2012–13	L.A. Clippers	**82***	**82***	24.5	.643*	—	.386	7.2	.3	.6	1.4	8.8
2013–14	L.A. Clippers	**82**	**82***	**35.0**	.676*	—	.428	13.6*	.9	**1.0**	**2.5**	10.4
2014–15	L.A. Clippers	**82**	**82***	34.4	.710*	.250	.397	15.0*	.7	**1.0**	2.2	11.5
2015–16	L.A. Clippers	77	77	33.7	.703*	.000	.430	13.8	1.2	.7	2.3	**12.7**
2016–17	L.A. Clippers	81	81	31.7	.714*	.000	.430	13.8	1.2	.6	1.7	**12.7**
2017–18	L.A. Clippers	77	77	31.5	.645	—	.580	**15.2**	1.5	.5	.9	12.0
2018–19	Dallas	50	50	31.1	.644	—	.682	13.7	2.0	.7	1.1	11.0
2018–19	New York	19	19	26.0	.634	—	**.773**	11.4	**3.0**	.5	1.1	10.9
2019–20	Brooklyn	56	6	22.0	.666	—	.680	10.0	1.9	.3	.9	8.3
2020–21	Brooklyn	57	43	21.9	.763	.000	.500	7.5	1.6	.3	1.1	7.5
2021–22	L.A. Lakers	32	19	12.8	.674	—	.462	5.4	.4	.3	.8	4.1
2021–22	Philadelphia	16	1	13.4	.593	—	.714	5.8	.5	.1	.6	4.6
2022–23^{†}	Denver	39	8	15.0	**.765**	**1.000**	.458	5.2	.9	.3	.6	5.1
2023–24	Denver	36	2	11.0	.624	—	.491	4.4	.7	.2	.4	3.9
2024–25	Denver	56	5	12.3	.650	—	.422	5.1	.9	.3	.5	3.7
2025–26	New Orleans	12	7	16.6	.656	—	.647	6.3	.9	.3	.8	4.4
Career		1,123	798	25.0	.673‡	.154	.475	9.7	.9	.5	1.4	8.5
All-Star		1	0	12.5	.600	.000	—	3.0	2.0	.0	.0	6.0

==== Playoffs ====
Year	Team	GP	GS	MPG	FG%	3P%	FT%	RPG	APG	SPG	BPG	PPG
2012	L.A. Clippers	11	11	22.7	.525	—	.333	5.3	.4	.6	1.6	4.5
2013	L.A. Clippers	6	6	24.1	.455	—	.222	6.3	.2	.2	1.7	3.7
2014	L.A. Clippers	13	13	34.0	.730	—	.434	12.5	.8	.9	2.5	9.6
2015	L.A. Clippers	**14**	**14**	34.5	.716	—	.427	13.4	1.1	1.1	2.4	13.1
2016	L.A. Clippers	6	6	33.1	.632	—	.373	**16.3**	**1.8**	**1.2**	**2.7**	11.7
2017	L.A. Clippers	7	7	**37.8**	.705	.000	.393	14.4	.7	.4	.9	**15.4**
2022	Philadelphia	3	2	10.2	**1.000**	—	—	2.3	.3	.0	.7	3.3
2023^{†}	Denver	4	0	3.4	.667	—	.500	1.0	.3	.0	.3	1.3
2024	Denver	2	0	6.5	.500	—	**1.000**	1.5	.0	.5	.5	2.0
2025	Denver	7	0	5.1	**1.000**	—	.000	1.3	.3	.0	.1	.9
Career		73	59	25.7	.670‡	.000	.404	9.2	.7	.6	1.7	8.0

=== College ===
Year	Team	GP	GS	MPG	FG%	3P%	FT%	RPG	APG	SPG	BPG	PPG
2007–08	Texas A&M	35	21	20.1	.617	–	.437	6.0	.4	.2	1.3	7.9

== See also ==
- List of NBA career rebounding leaders
- List of NBA career blocks leaders
- List of NBA career field goal percentage leaders
- List of NBA seasons played leaders
- List of NBA single-season rebounding leaders
- NBA post-season records
