= East Kentwood High School =

Public high school in Kentwood, Michigan, United States

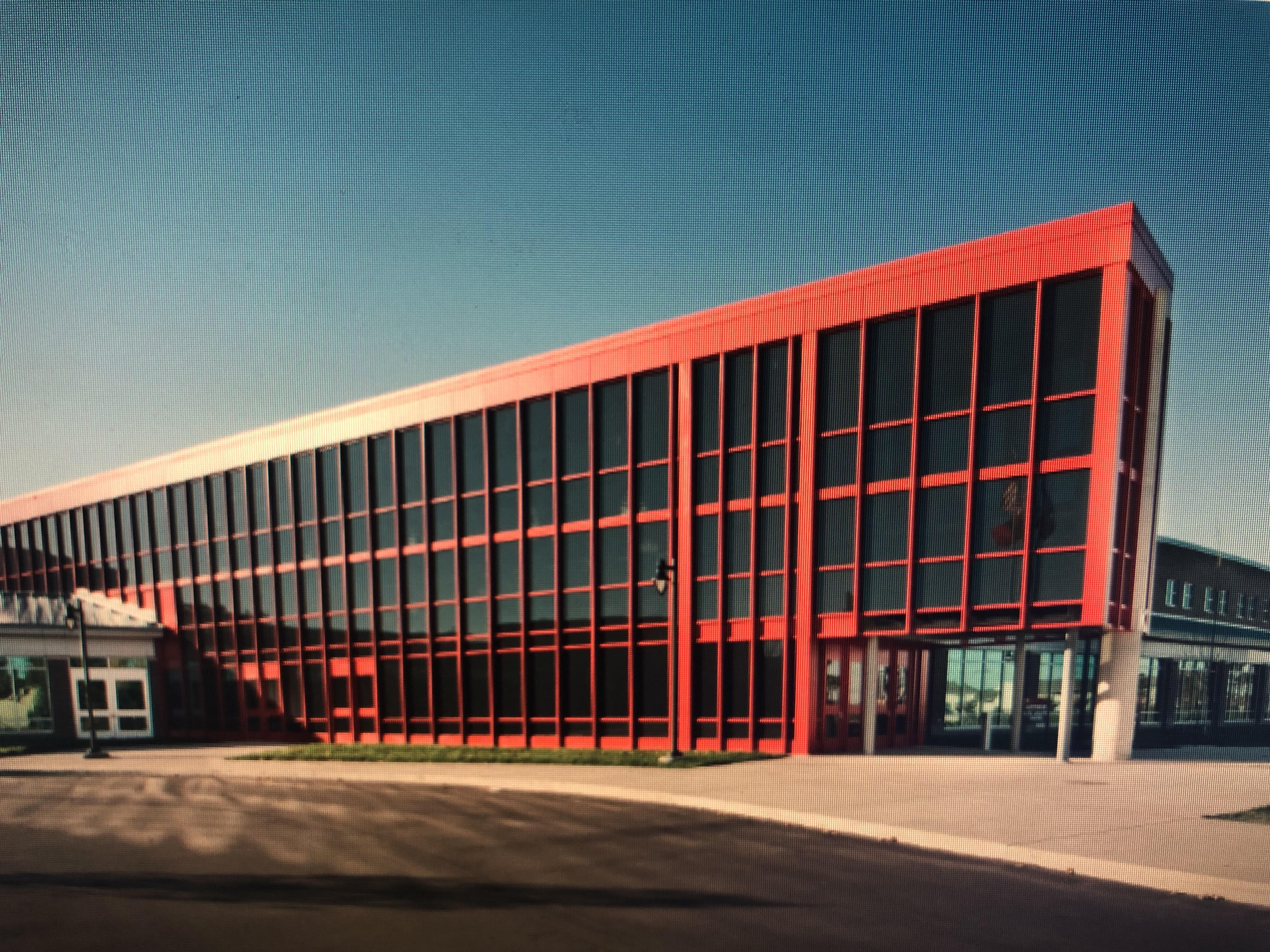

Location
- 6230 Kalamazoo Ave; Kentwood, Michigan 49508; United States; 42.8507°N 85.6193°W

Information
- School type: public, secondary
- Opened: 1969
- School district: Kentwood Public Schools
- NCES District ID: 2620340
- Superintendent: Kevin Polston
- NCES School ID: 262034005721
- Principal: Omar Bakri
- Staff: 106.75 (FTE)
- Grades: 10-12
- Gender: coed
- Enrollment: 2,087 (2023-2024)
- Student to teacher ratio: 19.55
- Campus type: Suburban
- Colors: red black
- Athletics conference: OK Conference
- Mascot: Freddy The Falcon
- Team name: Falcons
- Newspaper: The Talon
- Yearbook: Skyliner
- Website: official website

Student assessments
- 2021–22 school year Change vs. prior year

M-STEP 11th grade proficiency rates (Science / Social Studies)
- Advanced %: 15.8 / 9.6
- Proficient %: 22.0 / 29.9
- PR. Proficient %: 13.5 / 45.3
- Not Proficient %: 48.7 / 15.2

Average test scores
- SAT Total: 943.1 (▼ −15.7)

East Kentwood High School (EKHS) is a public high school located in the city of Kentwood, Michigan, United States. It is part of the Kentwood Public Schools district, working together with the Crossroads High School, an alternative learning center.

== History ==
East Kentwood High School was built in 1969 and opened in fall 1970. Since then it has undergone numerous renovations, including the addition of the Freshman Wing (later called the West Wing) in 1975 and the construction of the Freshman Campus in 1994. Further construction was finished in 1983, 1986, 1994, and 2006. The 1994 project included a renovation of the fieldhouse and expansion of the former Freshman Wing, which involved adding several new science classrooms. In the mid-1980s, a south corridor was completed to shelter students crossing between wings. East Kentwood is one of two public high schools in the state of Michigan to have its own ice arena on campus. East Kentwood also has its own competitive and community swimming pools, and a 1,600-seat Fine Arts Auditorium.

The original Kentwood high school, which is now Crestwood Middle School, opened in 1960. When the new site was built in 1969, the new school was named East Kentwood because there were plans to eventually build a second high school, which would have been known as West Kentwood a few years later. West Kentwood would have built on the same physical campus as East Kentwood. When the first vote for a second high school was turned down in the early 1970s it led to the construction of East Kentwood's first swimming pool as well as what was referred to as the Freshman wing. To this day, talks of building a second high school periodically resurface but have so far been turned down in favor of the economic advantages of running one large high school.

== Renovation ==
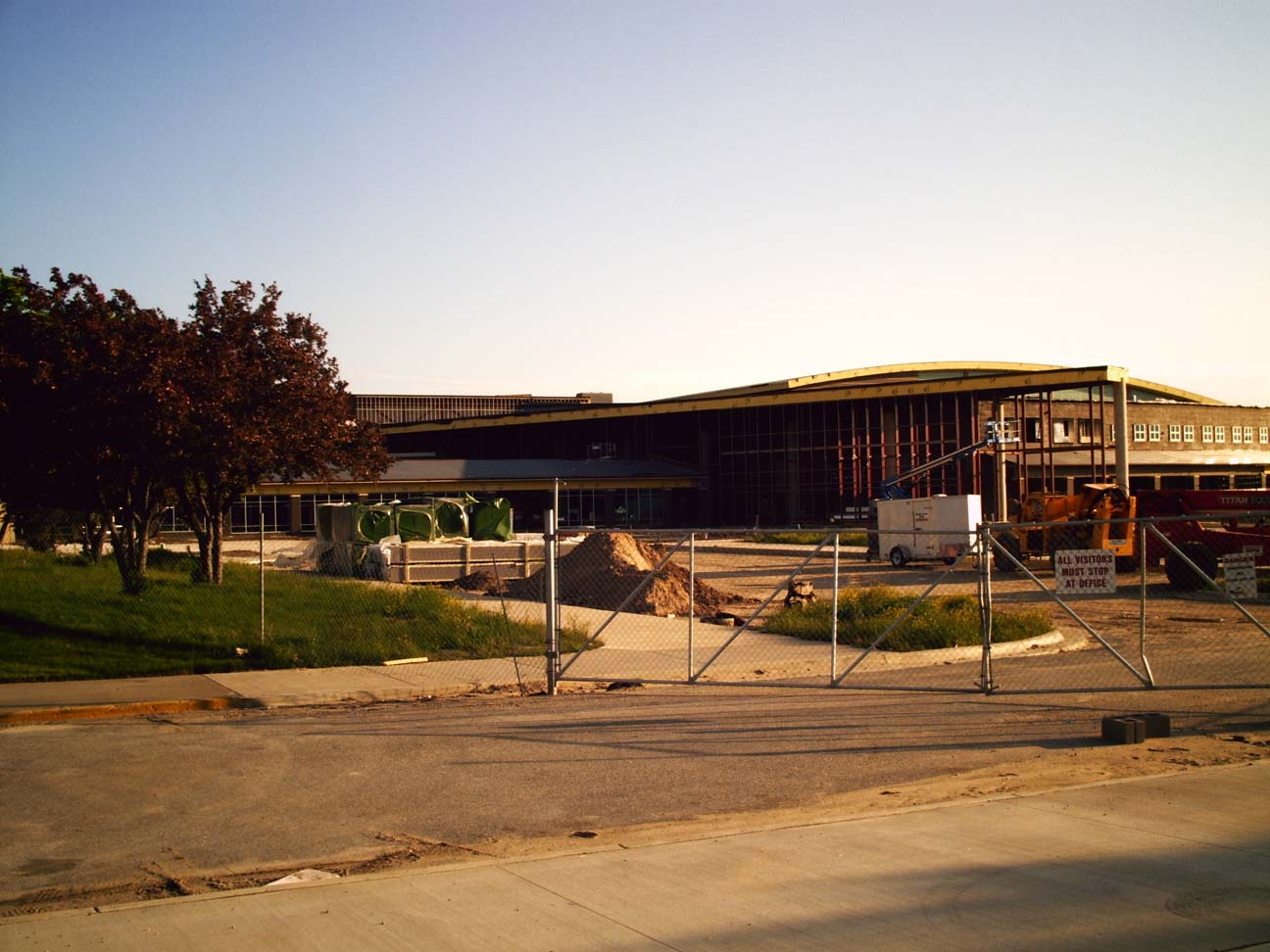
East Kentwood 10-12 Building during construction

In 2003, an $85.5 million bond was passed that allowed new construction at the High School Campus. A new athletic stadium was built with a capacity of over 7,500 along with a new 38-meter pool and a 75-foot community pool. Further work was done at the Freshman Campus to build it to the supportable core of 1,450 students with the moving of office and support staff to a new highly visible wing, and renovation of the previous office space with six classrooms and adding onto the existing classroom wings with 10 rooms. Additional work was done at the 10-12 main campus with the addition of more performing arts space including new practice rooms along with work at the auditorium with more dressing rooms, staging areas, and a new lighting and sound system. Furthermore, the seating was also refurnished.

Another major project was the expansion of the east wing cafeteria and renovation of classrooms in that wing. The circle drive that has been a mainstay of the school was removed with a new corridor built to link the west and east wings. The new corridor also puts a large commons area in front of the school with the pools, field house, and auditorium on each side. This hallway added 6 entrances, which is twice as many as before, along with creating two courtyards. Beyond the front of the school work the art department was given a remodel which includes a new art gallery. Along with all of this new carpeting has been placed through the school. Furthermore, a south side road was placed between the school and the practice fields along with a possible storage facility were added between the new south road and the field house. A renovation of the softball and baseball diamonds was also done then which included new home plate structures, scoreboards, and permanent bleachers.

In the summer of 2011, the library was renovated, as was the weight room.

== Curriculum ==
East Kentwood offers 21 Advanced Placement courses. Those courses include AP Biology, AP Calculus, AP Drawing, AP Chemistry, AP Macroeconomics, AP Microeconomics, AP English Language, AP US Government and Politics, AP Latin, AP Psychology, AP Physics, AP Spanish Language, AP Spanish Literature, AP Statistics, AP U.S. History, AP English Literature, AP Studio Art, AP World History, and AP Computer Science.
