= 1988–89 Illinois State Redbirds men's basketball team =

American college basketball season

1988–89 Illinois State Redbirds men's basketball
- Conference: Missouri Valley Conference
- Record: 13–17 (6–8 MVC)
- Head coach: Bob Donewald (11th season)
- Home arena: Horton Field House & Redbird Arena

1988–89 Missouri Valley Conference men's basketball standings
	Conf.				Overall
Team	W		L	PCT	W		L	PCT
Creighton †	11	–	3	.786	20	–	11	.645
Wichita State	10	–	4	.714	19	–	11	.633
Tulsa	10	–	4	.714	18	–	13	.581
Bradley	7	–	7	.500	13	–	14	.481
Drake	6	–	8	.429	12	–	17	.414
Southern Illinois	6	–	8	.429	20	–	14	.588
Illinois State	6	–	8	.429	13	–	17	.433
Indiana State	0	–	14	.000	4	–	24	.143
† 1989 MVC tournament winner Rankings from AP Poll

The 1988–89 Illinois State Redbirds men's basketball team represented Illinois State University during the 1988–89 NCAA Division I men's basketball season. The Redbirds, led by eleventh year head coach Bob Donewald, played their home games at both Horton Field House (finishing December, 1988) and Redbird Arena (starting January, 1989) and were a member of the Missouri Valley Conference.

The Redbirds finished the season 13–17, 6–8 in conference play to finish in a tie for fifth place. They were the number seven seed in the Missouri Valley Conference tournament. They were victorious in a quarterfinal game versus Wichita State University but were defeated in a semifinal game versus Southern Illinois University.

== Roster ==
1988–89 Illinois State Redbirds men's basketball team
Players
Coaches

Pos.	#	Name	Height	Weight	Year	Hometown
C	53	Jon Pemberton	6 ft 9 in (2.06 m)	—	RS Jr	Bloomingdale, IL
G	25	Randy Blair	6 ft 3 in (1.91 m)	—	Jr	Peoria, IL
F	52	Jarrod Coleman	6 ft 7 in (2.01 m)	—	Jr	North Chicago, IL
G	43	Rickey Jackson	6 ft 5 in (1.96 m)	—	Jr	Mount Morris, MI
F	44	Sonny Roberts	6 ft 8 in (2.03 m)	—	Jr	South Beloit, IL
G	24	Sam Skarich	6 ft 5 in (1.96 m)	—	RS So	St. Cloud, MN
F	35	Derek Stokes	6 ft 6 in (1.98 m)	—	So	Rockford, IL
C	54	Dan Cox	6 ft 9 in (2.06 m)	—	RS Fr	Normal, IL
F	42	Scott Fowler	6 ft 5 in (1.96 m)	—	RS Fr	Chicago, IL
G	30	Elvin Florez	6 ft 3 in (1.91 m)	—	Fr	Chicago, IL
G	33	Antoine Hicks	5 ft 9 in (1.75 m)	—	Fr	Chicago, IL
F	32	Xavier Williams	6 ft 6 in (1.98 m)	—	Fr	Michigan City, IN

Head coach

- Bob Donewald (Hanover)

Assistant coach(es)

- Anthony Jones
- Bill Zuiker
- Parker Laketa
- Mark Zwart

Legend

- (C) Team captain
- (S) Suspended
- (I) Ineligible
- (W) Walk-on
- Injured
- Current redshirt

== Schedule ==
Date time, TV	Rank^{#}	Opponent^{#}	Result	Record	High points	High rebounds	High assists	Site (attendance) city, state
Exhibition Season
November 10, 1988*; 7:30 pm		Brazil	L 53–58		14 – Jackson	8 – Jackson, Roberts	–	Horton Field House; Normal, IL
Regular Season
November 18, 1988*; 6:30 pm		at Indiana; Big Apple NIT [First Round]	L 48–83	0–1	20 – Jackson	8 – Coleman	–	Assembly Hall (12,165); Bloomington, IN
November 26, 1988*; 7:30 pm		Western Illinois	W 79–68	1–1	23 – Coleman	11 – Coleman	–	Horton Field House (4,935); Normal, IL
November 28, 1988*; 7:30 pm		Coppin State	W 78–75 ^{2OT}	2–1	20 – Coleman, Jackson	9 – Pemberton	–	Horton Field House (6,959); Normal, IL
December 3, 1988*; 2:30 pm, WGN		DePaul	L 77–78	2–2	20 – Jackson	8 – Jackson	–	Horton Field House (7,725); Normal, IL
December 6, 1988*; 6:30 pm		at Purdue	L 56–57	2–3	12 – Jackson	4 – Pemberton	–	Mackey Arena (14,123); West Lafayette, IN
December 10, 1988*; 2:30 pm		at Illinois–Chicago	L 61–62	2–4	16 – Jackson	6 – Coleman, Roberts	–	UIC Pavilion (3,885); Chicago, IL
December 17, 1988*; 6:00 pm, Score		at Saint Louis	L 55–92	2–5	17 – Coleman	5 – Coleman	–	Kiel Auditorium (5,623); St. Louis, MO
December 20, 1988*; 7:30 pm		at Southwest Missouri State	W 55–51	3–5	23 – Jackson	4 – Coleman, Roberts	–	John Q. Hammons Student Center (6,864); Springfield, MO
December 28, 1988*; 5:30 pm		vs. Memphis State; Volunteer Classic [Semifinal]	L 45–68	3–6	20 – Coleman	13 – Coleman	–	Thompson–Boling Arena (19,078); Knoxville, TN
December 29, 1988*; 5:30 pm		vs. Miami (Ohio); Volunteer Classic [Third Place]	L 58–61	3–7	25 – Coleman	7 – Coleman	–	Thompson–Boling Arena (22,015); Knoxville, TN
January 5, 1989; 7:30 pm		at Drake	L 63–73	3–8 (0–1)	18 – Jackson	9 – Coleman	–	Veterans Memorial Auditorium (5,921); Des Moines, IA
January 9, 1989; 8:00 pm, SportsVision		at Creighton	L 58–68	3–9 (0–2)	17 – Coleman	10 – Coleman	6 – Blair	Omaha Civic Auditorium (3,342); Omaha, NE
January 11, 1989*; 7:30 pm, TeleCable		Chicago State	W 71–70	4–9	17 – Coleman	13 – Coleman	–	Redbird Arena (9,724); Normal, IL
January 15, 1989; 5:00 pm, USA		Bradley	W 91–83	5–9 (1–2)	26 – Coleman	10 – Coleman	–	Redbird Arena (10,075); Normal, IL
January 18, 1989*; 7:30 pm, SportsVision		Loyola–Chicago	W 82–65	6–9	22 – Coleman	8 – Blair	–	Redbird Arena (8,979); Normal, IL
January 21, 1989; 7:30 pm		at Wichita State	L 53–65	6–10 (1–3)	14 – Fowler	6 – Blair	7 – Blair	Henry Levitt Arena (10,575); Wichita, KS
January 23, 1989; 8:00 pm		at Tulsa	L 51-53	6–11 (1–4)	16 – Jackson	4 – Stokes	–	Tulsa Convention Center (5,006); Tulsa, OK
January 28, 1989; 2:30 pm, TeleCable		Creighton	W 76-66	7–11 (2–4)	26 – Coleman	8 – Jackson, Fowler, Stokes	6 – Blair	Redbird Arena (9,343); Normal, IL
January 30, 1989; 7:30 pm, TeleCable		Southern Illinois	L 67-74	7–12 (2–5)	25 – Coleman	5 – Coleman, Stokes	7 – Blair	Redbird Arena (9,191); Normal, IL
February 4, 1989; 2:30 pm, TeleCable		Tulsa	L 63–67	7–13 (2–6)	21 – Coleman	12 – Coleman	–	Redbird Arena (9,665); Normal, IL
February 6, 1989; 8:00 pm, SportsVision		Wichita State	W 57–52	8–13 (3–6)	22 – Jackson	9 – Fowler	8 – Blair	Redbird Arena (8,453); Normal, IL
February 11, 1989; 7:30 pm		at Indiana State	W 86–83	9–13 (4–6)	36 – Jackson	10 – Jackson	–	Hulman Center (4,150); Terre Haute, IN
February 14, 1989*; 7:30 pm		Fairleigh Dickinson	W 60–56	10–13	14 – Coleman, Jackson	7 – Jackson	–	Redbird Arena (9,228); Normal, IL
February 16, 1989; 7:30 pm, TeleCable		Drake	L 48–58	10–14 (4–7)	17 – Coleman	5 – Coleman	–	Redbird Arena (10,177); Normal, IL
February 20, 1989; 8:00 pm, SportsVision		at Bradley	L 66–78	10–15 (4–8)	19 – Roberts	9 – Coleman	–	Carver Arena (10,227); Peoria, IL
February 22, 1989*; 7:30 pm		at Butler	L 49–66	10–16	15 – Coleman	5 – Blair, Fowler	–	Hinkle Fieldhouse (940); Indianapolis, IN
February 25, 1989; 6:00 pm, SportsVision		Indiana State	W 78–68	11–16 (5–8)	25 – Coleman, Jackson	13 – Coleman	–	Redbird Arena (10,024); Normal, IL
February 27, 1989		at Southern Illinois	W 83–82	12–16 (6–8)	27 – Jackson	8 – Coleman	6 – Blair	SIU Arena (7,787); Carbondale, IL
Pepsi Missouri Valley Conference {MVC} tournament
March 4, 1989*; SportsVision	(7)	at (2) Wichita State; Quarterfinal	W 66–60	13–16	22 – Jackson	12 – Jackson	4 – Skarich	Henry Levitt Arena (8,890); Wichita, KS
March 5, 1989*; SportsVision	(7)	vs. (6) Southern Illinois; Semifinal	L 61–69	13–17	18 – Jackson	6 – Jackson	3 – Skarich	Henry Levitt Arena (8,870); Wichita, KS
*Non-conference game. ^{#}Rankings from AP Poll. (#) Tournament seedings in parentheses. All times are in Central Standard Time.
