= 1989 Big Eight Conference men's basketball tournament =

- Classification: Division I
- Season: 1988–89
- Teams: 8
- Finals site: Kemper Arena; Kansas City, MO
- Champions: Missouri (4th title)
- Winning coach: Norm Stewart (4th title)
- MVP: Doug Smith (Missouri)
- Television: Raycom Sports (Quarterfinals, Semi-Finals and Championship); ABC (Championship game)

1988–89 Big Eight Conference men's basketball standings
	Conf.				Overall
Team	W		L	PCT	W		L	PCT
No. 4 Oklahoma	12	–	2	.857	30	–	6	.833
No. 6 Missouri †	10	–	4	.714	29	–	8	.784
Kansas State	8	–	6	.571	19	–	11	.633
Oklahoma State	7	–	7	.500	17	–	13	.567
Iowa State	7	–	7	.500	17	–	12	.586
Kansas	6	–	8	.429	19	–	12	.613
Nebraska	4	–	10	.286	17	–	16	.515
Colorado	2	–	12	.143	7	–	21	.250
† 1989 Big Eight tournament winner As of March 3, 2012; Rankings from AP poll

The 1989 Big Eight Conference men's basketball tournament was held March 10–12 at Kemper Arena in Kansas City, Missouri.

Second-seeded Missouri defeated #1 seed Oklahoma in the championship game, 98–86, to earn the conference's automatic bid to the 1989 NCAA tournament.

== Bracket ==
Quarterfinals; Friday, March 10
1	#2 Oklahoma	95
8	Colorado	87
4	Oklahoma State	69
5	Iowa State	88
3	Kansas State	73
6	Kansas	65
7	Nebraska	70
2	#10 Missouri	98

Semifinals; Saturday, March 11
1	#2 Oklahoma	76
5	Iowa State	74
3	Kansas State	83
2	#10 Missouri	88

Championship; Sunday, March 12
1	#2 Oklahoma	86
2	#10 Missouri	98
