= 1988–89 DePaul Blue Demons men's basketball team =

American college basketball season

1988–89 DePaul Blue Demons men's basketball
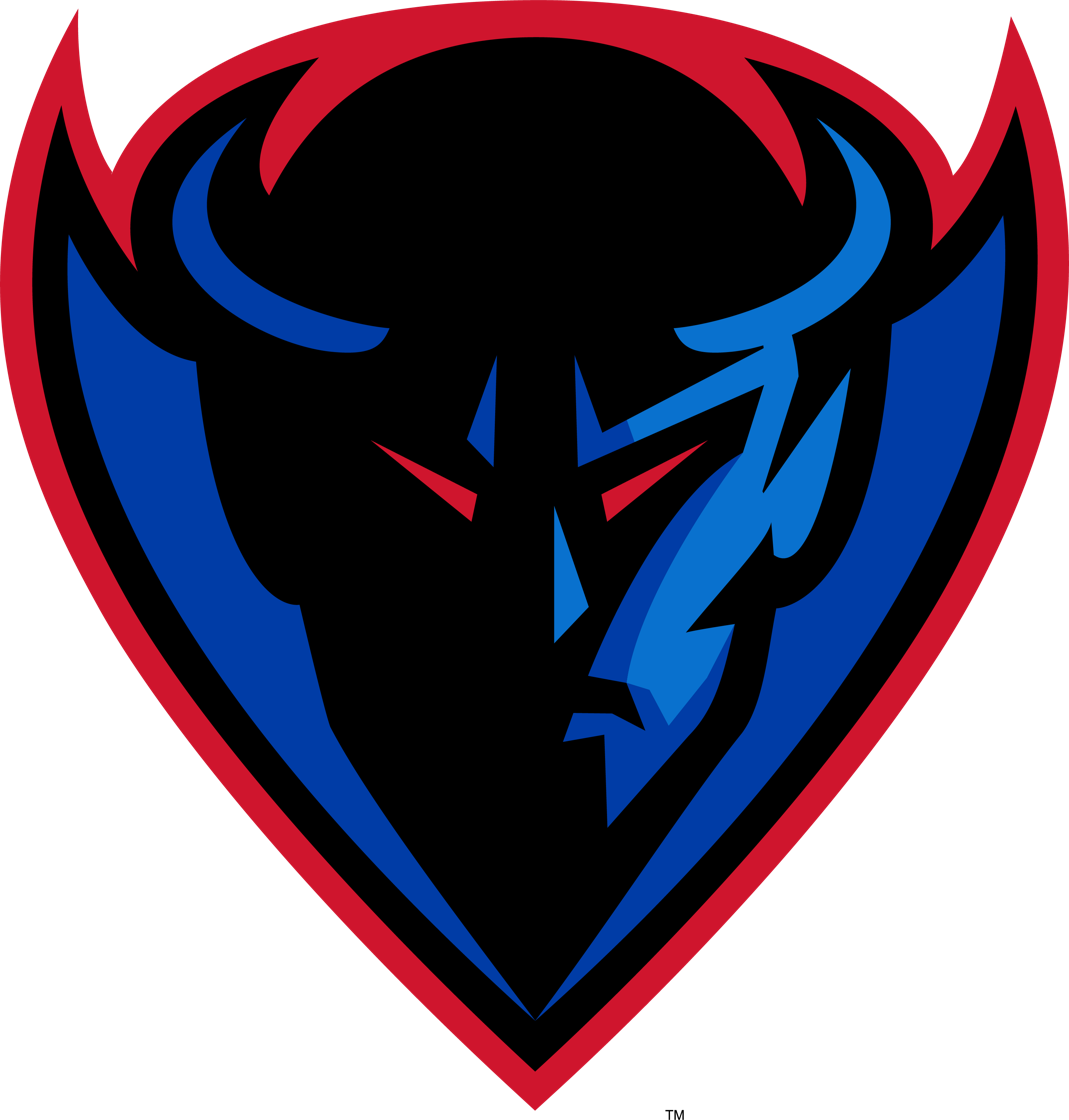

NCAA tournament, second round
- Conference: Independent
- Record: 21–12
- Head coach: Joey Meyer (5th season)
- Assistant coaches: Jim Molinari (10th season); Jim Platt (5th season); Dwayne Tyus; Jay Goedert
- Home arena: Rosemont Horizon

1988–89 NCAA Division I men's basketball independents standings
	Conf.				Overall
Team	W		L	PCT	W		L	PCT
Akron		–		–	21	–	8	.724
Notre Dame		–		–	21	–	9	.700
DePaul		–		–	21	–	12	.636
Miami (FL)		–		–	19	–	12	.613
UMBC		–		–	17	–	11	.607
Wright State		–		–	17	–	11	.607
Marquette		–		–	13	–	15	.464
Mount St. Mary's		–		–	12	–	15	.444
Chicago State		–		–	12	–	16	.429
Nicholls State		–		–	12	–	16	.429
Northern Illinois		–		–	11	–	17	.393
U.S. International		–		–	11	–	17	.393
Liberty		–		–	10	–	17	.370
Central Connecticut State		–		–	10	–	18	.357
Florida International		–		–	10	–	18	.357
Southern Utah		–		–	10	–	18	.357
UMKC		–		–	9	–	18	.333
Oral Roberts		–		–	8	–	20	.286
Central Florida		–		–	7	–	20	.259
Davidson		–		–	7	–	24	.226
Youngstown State		–		–	5	–	23	.179
Brooklyn		–		–	4	–	23	.148
Southeastern Louisiana		–		–	3	–	24	.111
Rankings from AP Poll

The 1988–89 DePaul Blue Demons men's basketball team represented DePaul University during the 1988–89 NCAA Division I men's basketball season. They were led by head coach Joey Meyer, in his 5th season, and played their home games at the Rosemont Horizon in Rosemont.

== Roster ==
1988–89 DePaul Blue Demons men's basketball team
Players
Coaches

Pos.	#	Name	Height	Weight	Year	Previous school	Hometown
G	10	Gilbert Miller	6 ft 1 in (1.85 m)	170 lb (77 kg)	Jr	Southwestern	Flint, MI
G	12	Chuckie Miller	6 ft 0 in (1.83 m)	155 lb (70 kg)	Fr	St. Joseph	Westchester, IL
G/F	13	Terence Greene	6 ft 4 in (1.93 m)	210 lb (95 kg)	Sr	Flint Central	Flint, MI
F	15	Kevin Holland	6 ft 7 in (2.01 m)	210 lb (95 kg)	Jr	Cerritos	Cerritos, CA
G	20	Melvon Foster	6 ft 3 in (1.91 m)	180 lb (82 kg)	So	Harper	Chicago, IL
F/C	21	Stephen Howard	6 ft 9 in (2.06 m)	210 lb (95 kg)	Fr	Bishop Lynch HS	Dallas, TX
G	22	Brad Niemann	6 ft 3 in (1.91 m)	175 lb (79 kg)	So	Glenbrook South	Glenview, IL
F	23	Stanley Brundy	6 ft 6 in (1.98 m)	205 lb (93 kg)	Sr	Crenshaw	Los Angeles, CA
F	25	Chris Henderson	6 ft 6 in (1.98 m)	220 lb (100 kg)	Jr	Leo	Chicago, IL
F/C	30	David Booth	6 ft 7 in (2.01 m)	205 lb (93 kg)	Fr	Manual HS	Peoria, IL
F/C	31	Bill Heppner	6 ft 8 in (2.03 m)	215 lb (98 kg)	So	Crystal Lake Central	Crystal Lake, IL
F	32	Curtis Price	6 ft 6 in (1.98 m)	190 lb (86 kg)	Fr	St. Rita	Chicago, IL
F/C	34	Charles Sowell	6 ft 10 in (2.08 m)	230 lb (104 kg)	Jr	E. E. Smith	Fayetteville, NC
C	44	James Hamby	7 ft 1 in (2.16 m)	225 lb (102 kg)	Jr	Elgin	Elgin, IL
C	50	Curtis Jackson	6 ft 10 in (2.08 m)	230 lb (104 kg)	Jr	Brockton	Brockton, MA

Head coach

- Joey Meyer

Assistant coach(es)

- Jim Molinari (Illinois Wesleyan)
- Jim Platt (Concordia (IL))
- Dwayne Tyus
- Jay Goedert

Legend

- (C) Team captain
- (S) Suspended
- (I) Ineligible
- (W) Walk-on
- Injured
- Current redshirt

Roster

== Schedule and results ==
Date time, TV	Rank^{#}	Opponent^{#}	Result	Record	Site city, state
Regular Season
Nov 25, 1988*		vs. No. 8 UNLV; Maui Invitational	L 77–86	0–1	Lahaina Civic Center (3,700); Lahaina, HI
Nov 26, 1988*		vs. No. 16 Ohio State; Maui Invitational	L 70–72	0–2	Lahaina Civic Center (2,000); Lahaina, HI
Nov 26, 1988*		at Chaminade; Maui Invitational	W 89–68	1–2	Lahaina Civic Center (1,200); Lahaina, HI
Nov 30, 1988*		Maine	W 66–46	2–2	Rosemont Horizon (8,107); Rosemont, IL
Dec 3, 1988*; 2:30 p.m., WGN		at Illinois State	W 78–77	3–2	Horton Field House (7,725); Normal, IL
Dec 6, 1988*		Washington	L 75–79	3–3	Rosemont Horizon (8,807); Rosemont, IL
Dec 10, 1988*		at Niagara	W 82–75	4–3	Niagara Falls Convention Center (5,746); Niagara Falls, NY
Dec 14, 1988*		American	W 120–85	5–3	Rosemont Horizon (7,841); Rosemont, IL
Dec 17, 1988*		at No. 5 Georgetown	L 64–74	5–4	Capital Centre (9,268); Landover, MD
Dec 22, 1988*		North Carolina A&T; Old Style Classic	W 73–52	6–4	Rosemont Horizon (5,358); Rosemont, IL
Dec 23, 1988*		Loyola Marymount; Old Style Classic	W 115–111	7–4	Rosemont Horizon (7,433); Rosemont, IL
Dec 28, 1988*		vs. Mississippi State; Sugar Bowl Tournament	W 62–60	8–4	Louisiana Superdome (4,915); New Orleans, LA
Dec 29, 1988*; 9:00 p.m.		vs. No. 13 Seton Hall; Sugar Bowl Tournament finals	L 60–83	8–5	Louisiana Superdome (6,514); New Orleans, LA
Jan 5, 1989*		No. 6 North Carolina	L 67–87	8–6	Rosemont Horizon (17,283); Rosempont, IL
Jan 7, 1989*		at No. 13 Louisville	L 67–81	8–7	Freedom Hall (19,437); Louisville, KY
Jan 11, 1989*		Eastern Illinois	W 89–75	9–7	Rosemont Horizon (8,854); Rosemont, IL
Jan 14, 1989*		Loyola Marymount	W 122–108	10–7	Rosemont Horizon (9,656); Rosemont, IL
Jan 17, 1989*		at Marquette	L 64–72	10–8	Bradley Center (12,543); Milwaukee, WI
Jan 21, 1989*		at Loyola (IL)	L 69–70	10–9	International Amphitheatre (4,407); Chicago, IL
Jan 24, 1989*		at Bradley	W 85–82	11–9	Carver Arena (9,251); Peoria, IL
Jan 28, 1989*		at South Florida	W 67–59	12–9	Sun Dome (7,361); Tampa, Florida
Jan 31, 1989*		Duquesne	W 85–63	13–9	Rosemont Horizon (8,458); Rosemont, IL
Feb 4, 1989*		No. 13 NC State	W 81–74	14–9	Rosemont Horizon (11,764); Rosemont, IL
Feb 7, 1989*		at Dayton	W 78–50	15–9	UD Arena (11,248); Dayton, OH
Feb 11, 1989*		Miami (FL)	W 89–79	16–9	Rosemont Horizon (10,805); Rosemont, IL
Feb 18, 1989*		St. John's	L 64–67	16–10	Rosemont Horizon (11,780); Rosemont, IL
Feb 22, 1989*		Texas-San Antonio	W 88–55	17–10	Rosemont Horizon (11,917); Rosemont, IL
Feb 25, 1989*		vs. Fordham	W 62–61	18–10	Madison Square Garden (19,591); New York, New York
Mar 1, 1989*		at Notre Dame	L 60–67	18–11	Joyce Center (11,278); Notre Dame, IN
Mar 4, 1989*		Marquette	W 91–79	19–11	Rosemont Horizon (13,629); Rosemont, IL
Mar 11, 1989*		Notre Dame	W 73–70	20–11	Rosemont Horizon (17,651); Rosemont, IL
NCAA Tournament
Mar 16, 1989*	(12 W)	vs. (5 W) Memphis State; First Round	W 66–63	21–11	BSU Pavilion (12,241); Boise, ID
Mar 18, 1989*	(12 W)	vs. (4 W) No. 15 UNLV; Second Round	L 70–85	21–12	BSU Pavilion (12,428); Boise, ID
*Non-conference game. ^{#}Rankings from AP Poll. (#) Tournament seedings in parentheses. W=West. All times are in Central Time.

== Team players drafted into the NBA ==
Round	Pick	Player	NBA Club
2	32	Stanley Brundy	New Jersey Nets
