= 1988–89 Notre Dame Fighting Irish men's basketball team =

American college basketball season

1988–89 Notre Dame Fighting Irish men's basketball

NCAA tournament, Second round
- Conference: Independent
- Record: 21–9
- Head coach: Digger Phelps (18th season)
- Assistant coach: Fran McCaffery (1st season)
- Home arena: Joyce Center

1988–89 NCAA Division I men's basketball independents standings
	Conf.				Overall
Team	W		L	PCT	W		L	PCT
Akron		–		–	21	–	8	.724
Notre Dame		–		–	21	–	9	.700
DePaul		–		–	21	–	12	.636
Miami (FL)		–		–	19	–	12	.613
UMBC		–		–	17	–	11	.607
Wright State		–		–	17	–	11	.607
Marquette		–		–	13	–	15	.464
Mount St. Mary's		–		–	12	–	15	.444
Chicago State		–		–	12	–	16	.429
Nicholls State		–		–	12	–	16	.429
Northern Illinois		–		–	11	–	17	.393
U.S. International		–		–	11	–	17	.393
Liberty		–		–	10	–	17	.370
Central Connecticut State		–		–	10	–	18	.357
Florida International		–		–	10	–	18	.357
Southern Utah		–		–	10	–	18	.357
UMKC		–		–	9	–	18	.333
Oral Roberts		–		–	8	–	20	.286
Central Florida		–		–	7	–	20	.259
Davidson		–		–	7	–	24	.226
Youngstown State		–		–	5	–	23	.179
Brooklyn		–		–	4	–	23	.148
Southeastern Louisiana		–		–	3	–	24	.111
Rankings from AP Poll

The 1988–89 Notre Dame Fighting Irish men's basketball team represented the University of Notre Dame during the 1988–89 college basketball season. The Irish were led by head coach Digger Phelps, in his 18th season. They finished with an overall record of 21–9. They received an at large bid as a #9 seed in the 1989 NCAA Tournament. In the opening round they defeated Vanderbilt but lost to top seed Georgetown 81–74.

== Roster ==
1988–89 Notre Dame Fighting Irish men's basketball team
Players
Coaches

Pos.	#	Name	Height	Weight	Year	Hometown
PG	12	Elmer Bennett	6 ft 0 in (1.83 m)	160 lb (73 kg)	Fr	Bellaire, Texas
PF	20	LaPhonso Ellis	6 ft 8 in (2.03 m)	220 lb (100 kg)	Fr	East St. Louis, Illinois
C	43	Keith Tower	6 ft 11 in (2.11 m)	240 lb (109 kg)	Fr	Coraopolis, Pennsylvania
G		Joe Fredrick	6 ft 4 in (1.93 m)	—	Jr
G		Jamere Jackson	6 ft 2 in (1.88 m)	—	Jr	Indianapolis, Indiana
F	50	Keith Robinson	6 ft 9 in (2.06 m)	—	Jr	Buffalo, New York
G	10	Tim Singleton	6 ft 1 in (1.85 m)	—	So
F		Daimon Sweet	6 ft 5 in (1.96 m)	—	Fr
C		Scott Paddock	6 ft 9 in (2.06 m)	—	Jr	Plantation, Florida
F		Kevin Ellery	6 ft 5 in (1.96 m)	225 lb (102 kg)	So	Springfield, Kentucky
G		Tim Crawford	6 ft 4 in (1.93 m)	—	Jr	Frankenmuth, Michigan
G		Keith Adkins	6 ft 0 in (1.83 m)	—	Fr	Paintsville, Kentucky

Head coach

- Digger Phelps (Rider)

Assistant coach(es)

Legend

- (C) Team captain
- (S) Suspended
- (I) Ineligible
- (W) Walk-on
- Injured
- Current redshirt

== Schedule and results ==
Date time, TV	Rank^{#}	Opponent^{#}	Result	Record	Site city, state
Regular Season
Nov 28, 1988*		St. Bonaventure	W 92–72	1–0	Joyce Center; Notre Dame, Indiana
Dec 3, 1988*		vs. Kentucky	W 81–65	2–0	RCA Dome; Indianapolis, Indiana
Dec 6, 1988*		Indiana	W 84–71	3–0	Joyce Center; Notre Dame, Indiana
Dec 10, 1988*		Creighton	W 77–64	4–0	Joyce Center; Notre Dame, Indiana
Dec 17, 1988*		at Valparaiso	L 68–71	4–1	Athletics-Recreation Center; Valparaiso, Indiana
Jan 2, 1989*		at Pennsylvania	W 60–55	5–1	Palestra; Philadelphia, Pennsylvania
Jan 7, 1989*		at San Francisco	L 75–79	5–2	War Memorial Gymnasium; San Francisco, California
Jan 9, 1989*		at Portland	W 80–58	6–2	Chiles Center; Portland, Oregon
Jan 14, 1989*		at UCLA	W 82–79	7–2	Pauley Pavilion; Los Angeles, California
Jan 17, 1989*		SMU	W 67–45	8–2	Joyce Center; Notre Dame, Indiana
Jan 21, 1989*		No. 11 Syracuse	L 87–99	8–3	Joyce Center; Notre Dame, Indiana
Jan 24, 1989*		Rutgers	W 85–63	9–3	Joyce Center; Notre Dame, Indiana
Jan 28, 1989*		Temple	W 64–60	10–3	Joyce Center; Notre Dame, Indiana
Jan 31, 1989*		Dayton	W 85–75	11–3	Joyce Center; Notre Dame, Indiana
Feb 2, 1989*		Marquette	W 83–68	12–3	Joyce Center; Notre Dame, Indiana
Feb 5, 1989*		No. 12 Duke	L 80–102	12–4	Joyce Center; Notre Dame, Indiana
Feb 8, 1989*		at Fordham	W 77–58	13–4	Rose Hill Gym; New York, New York
Feb 11, 1989*		USC	W 83–74	14–4	Joyce Center; Notre Dame, Indiana
Feb 14, 1989*		Boston College	L 72–83	14–5	Joyce Center; Notre Dame, Indiana
Feb 16, 1989*		La Salle	W 80–78	15–5	Joyce Center; Notre Dame, Indiana
Feb 19, 1989*		Houston	W 89–80	16–5	Joyce Center; Notre Dame, Indiana
Feb 21, 1989*		at Dayton	W 83–66	17–5	UD Arena; Dayton, Ohio
Feb 25, 1989*		at Georgia Tech	L 80–90	17–6	Alexander Memorial Coliseum; Atlanta, Georgia
Mar 1, 1989*		DePaul	W 67–60	18–6	Joyce Center; Notre Dame, Indiana
Mar 4, 1989*		No. 14 Louisville	L 77–87	18–7	Joyce Center; Notre Dame, Indiana
Mar 6, 1989*		at Butler	W 76–69	19–7	Hinkle Fieldhouse; Indianapolis, Indiana
Mar 8, 1989*		at Marquette	W 67–63	20–7	Bradley Center; Milwaukee, Wisconsin
Mar 11, 1989*		at DePaul	L 70–73	20–8	Rosemont Horizon; Rosemont, Illinois
NCAA tournament
Mar 17, 1989*	(9 E)	vs. (8 E) Vanderbilt; First Round	W 81–65	21–8	Providence Civic Center; Providence, Rhode Island
Mar 19, 1989*	(9 E)	vs. (1 E) No. 2 Georgetown; Second Round	L 74–81	21–9	Providence Civic Center; Providence, Rhode Island
*Non-conference game. ^{#}Rankings from AP Poll/UPI Poll. (#) Tournament seedings in parentheses.
