= 1988–89 Kansas Jayhawks men's basketball team =

American college basketball season

1988–89 Kansas Jayhawks men's basketball
- Conference: Big Eight Conference
- Record: 19–12 (6–8 Big Eight)
- Head coach: Roy Williams (1st season)
- Assistant coaches: Jerry Green (1st season); Steve Robinson (1st season); Kevin Stallings (1st season); Mark Turgeon (2nd season)
- Captains: Scooter Barry; Milt Newton
- Home arena: Allen Fieldhouse

1988–89 Big Eight Conference men's basketball standings
| | Conf. | | | | Overall |
| Team | W | | L | PCT | W | | L | PCT |
|---|---|---|---|---|---|---|---|---|
| No. 4 Oklahoma | 12 | – | 2 | .857 | 30 | – | 6 | .833 |
| No. 6 Missouri † | 10 | – | 4 | .714 | 29 | – | 8 | .784 |
| Kansas State | 8 | – | 6 | .571 | 19 | – | 11 | .633 |
| Oklahoma State | 7 | – | 7 | .500 | 17 | – | 13 | .567 |
| Iowa State | 7 | – | 7 | .500 | 17 | – | 12 | .586 |
| Kansas | 6 | – | 8 | .429 | 19 | – | 12 | .613 |
| Nebraska | 4 | – | 10 | .286 | 17 | – | 16 | .515 |
| Colorado | 2 | – | 12 | .143 | 7 | – | 21 | .250 |
† 1989 Big Eight tournament winner As of March 3, 2012; Rankings from AP poll

The 1988–89 Kansas Jayhawks men's basketball team represented the University of Kansas in the 1988–89 NCAA Division I men's basketball season, which was the Jayhawks' 91st basketball season. The head coach was Roy Williams, who served his 1st year at KU. The team played its home games in Allen Fieldhouse in Lawrence, Kansas. It is the most-recent season that KU failed to qualify for the NCAA Tournament, and that was due to an NCAA-imposed postseason ban imposed for recruiting violations committed by former coach Larry Brown. It also remains, as of the 2025–26 season the last time Kansas failed to win 20 games.

== Roster ==
| Name | # | Position | Height | Weight | Year | Home Town |
|---|---|---|---|---|---|---|
| Sean Alvarado | 52 | Center | 6-11 | 215 | Senior | Washington, D.C. |
| Scooter Barry | 10 | Guard | 6-4 | 175 | Senior | Concord, California |
| Jeff Gueldner | 33 | Guard/Forward | 6-5 | 180 | Junior | Charleston, Illinois |
| Brad Kampschroeder | | Forward | 6-7 | 190 | Senior | Naperville, Illinois |
| Mike Maddox | 32 | Forward | 6-8 | 200 | Sophomore | Reseda, California |
| Lincoln Minor | 11 | Guard | 6-3 | 175 | Senior | Houston, Texas |
| Milt Newton | 21 | Guard/Forward | 6-5 | 180 | Senior | Washington, D.C. |
| Kevin Pritchard | 14 | Guard | 6-4 | 180 | Junior | Tulsa, Oklahoma |
| Mark Randall | 42 | Forward | 6-9 | 225 | Sophomore | Englewood, Colorado |
| Kurt Sinnett | | | | | Freshman | |
| Freeman West | 34 | Forward | 6–5 | 190 | Junior | East Chicago, Indiana |

== Schedule ==
| Date time, TV | Rank^{#} | Opponent^{#} | Result | Record | Site city, state |
|---|---|---|---|---|---|
| 11/25/1988* | | at Alaska Anchorage; Great Alaska Shootout First Round | W 94-81 | 1-0 | Sullivan Arena; Anchorage, AK |
| 11/26/1988* | | vs. California; Great Alaska Shootout Semifinals | W 86-71 | 2-0 | Sullivan Arena; Anchorage, AK |
| 11/27/1988* | | vs. Seton Hall; Great Alaska Shootout Championship Game | L 81-92 | 2-1 | Sullivan Arena; Anchorage, AK |
| 12/1/1988* | | Seattle University | W 98-65 | 3-1 | Allen Fieldhouse; Lawrence, KS |
| 12/3/1988* | | Loyola | W 100-80 | 4-1 | Allen Fieldhouse; Lawrence, KS |
| 12/7/1988* | | Pacific Lutheran | W 112-61 | 5-1 | Allen Fieldhouse; Lawrence, KS |
| 12/10/1988* | | vs. Temple | W 95-78 | 6-1 | Boardwalk Hall; Atlantic City, NJ |
| 12/12/1988* | | Northern Arizona | W 109-59 | 7-1 | Allen Fieldhouse; Lawrence, KS |
| 12/21/1988* | No. 20 | at Texas Tech | W 81-80 | 8-1 | Lubbock Municipal Coliseum; Lubbock, Texas |
| 12/29/1988* | No. 20 | vs. Iona | W 100-67 | 9-1 | Kemper Arena; Kansas City, MO |
| 12/30/1988* | No. 20 | vs. Southwest Missouri State | W 82-73 | 10-1 | Kemper Arena; Kansas City, MO |
| 1/3/1989* | No. 18 | Brown | W 115-45 | 11-1 | Allen Fieldhouse; Lawrence, KS |
| 1/7/1989 | No. 18 | Iowa State | W 127-82 | 12-1 | Allen Fieldhouse; Lawrence, KS |
| 1/9/1989* | No. 18 | SMU | W 90-82 ^{OT} | 13-1 | Allen Fieldhouse; Lawrence, KS |
| 1/12/1989* | No. 16 | at Miami | L 86-87 | 13-2 | Miami Arena; Miami, FL |
| 1/14/1989 | No. 16 | at Kansas State; Sunflower Showdown | W 75-74 ^{OT} | 14-2 | Bramlage Coliseum; Manhattan, KS |
| 1/18/1989 | No. 17 | at No. 5 Oklahoma | L 95-123 | 14-3 | Lloyd Noble Center; Norman, OK |
| 1/21/1989 | No. 17 | at Colorado | W 89-74 | 15-3 | Coors Events Center; Boulder, CO |
| 1/25/1989* | No. 18 | Wichita State | W 86-66 | 16-3 | Allen Fieldhouse; Lawrence, KS |
| 1/28/1989 | No. 18 | Kansas State; Sunflower Showdown | L 70-71 | 16-4 | Allen Fieldhouse; Lawrence, KS |
| 2/1/1989 | | No. 5 Missouri; Border War | L 66-91 | 16-5 | Allen Fieldhouse; Lawrence, KS |
| 2/4/1989 | | at Nebraska | L 70-74 | 16-6 | Bob Devaney Sports Center; Lincoln, NE |
| 2/8/1989 | | Oklahoma State | L 81-87 | 16-7 | Allen Fieldhouse; Lawrence, KS |
| 2/11/1989 | | at No. 3 Missouri; Border War | L 80-93 | 16-8 | Hearnes Center; Columbia, MO |
| 2/15/1989 | | No. 1 Oklahoma | L 89-94 ^{OT} | 16-9 | Allen Fieldhouse; Lawrence, KS |
| 2/18/1989* | | at No. 11 Duke | L 77-102 | 16-10 | Cameron Indoor Stadium; Durham, NC |
| 2/22/1989 | | at Iowa State | L 89-97 | 16-11 | Hilton Coliseum; Ames, IA |
| 2/25/1989 | | Colorado | W 111-83 | 17-11 | Allen Fieldhouse; Lawrence, KS |
| 3/1/1989 | | Nebraska | W 80-71 | 18-11 | Allen Fieldhouse; Lawrence, KS |
| 3/4/1989 | | at Oklahoma State | W 79-78 | 19-11 | Gallagher-Iba Arena; Stillwater, OK |
Big Eight Tournament
| 3/10/1989 | | vs. Kansas State; Quarterfinals | L 65-73 | 19-12 | Kemper Arena; Kansas City, MO |
*Non-conference game. ^{#}Rankings from AP Poll, NCAA tournament seeds shown in parentheses. (#) Tournament seedings in parentheses. All times are in Central Standard Time.

== Rankings ==
| Poll | Pre | Wk 1 | Wk 2 | Wk 3 | Wk 4 | Wk 5 | Wk 6 | Wk 7 | Wk 8 | Wk 9 | Wk 10 | Wk 11 | Wk 12 | Wk 13 | Wk 14 | Wk 15 | Wk 16 | Wk 17 |
|---|---|---|---|---|---|---|---|---|---|---|---|---|---|---|---|---|---|---|
| AP | | | | | | 20 | 20 | 18 | 16 | 17 | 18 | | | | | | | |
| Coaches | | | | | | | | | | | | | | | | | | |

*There was no coaches poll in week 1.

== See also ==
- 1989 NCAA Men's Division I Basketball Tournament
