= 1988–89 Iowa State Cyclones men's basketball team =

American college basketball season

1988–89 Iowa State Cyclones men's basketball

NCAA tournament
- Conference: Big Eight Conference
- Record: 17–12 (7–7 Big Eight)
- Head coach: Johnny Orr (9th season)
- Home arena: Hilton Coliseum

1988–89 Big Eight Conference men's basketball standings
	Conf.				Overall
Team	W		L	PCT	W		L	PCT
No. 4 Oklahoma	12	–	2	.857	30	–	6	.833
No. 6 Missouri †	10	–	4	.714	29	–	8	.784
Kansas State	8	–	6	.571	19	–	11	.633
Oklahoma State	7	–	7	.500	17	–	13	.567
Iowa State	7	–	7	.500	17	–	12	.586
Kansas	6	–	8	.429	19	–	12	.613
Nebraska	4	–	10	.286	17	–	16	.515
Colorado	2	–	12	.143	7	–	21	.250
† 1989 Big Eight tournament winner As of March 3, 2012; Rankings from AP poll

The 1988–89 Iowa State Cyclones men's basketball team represented Iowa State University during the 1988–89 NCAA Division I men's basketball season. The Cyclones were coached by Johnny Orr, who was in his 9th season. They played their home games at Hilton Coliseum in Ames, Iowa.

They finished the season 17–12, 7–7 in Big Eight play to finish in 5th place. They earned an at-large bid to the NCAA tournament as the #10 seed in the Southeast region. The Cyclones lost to UCLA in the opening round of the tournament.

== Roster ==
1988–89 Iowa State Cyclones men's basketball team
Players
Coaches

Pos.	#	Name	Height	Weight	Year	Hometown
G	34	Sam Mack	6 ft 7 in (2.01 m)	—		Dolton, Illinois
F	41	Mark Baugh	6 ft 5 in (1.96 m)	—	Jr	Dolton, Illinois
F	52	Victor Alexander	6 ft 9 in (2.06 m)	255 lb (116 kg)	So	Detroit, Michigan
G	22	Mike Born (C)	6 ft 1 in (1.85 m)	—
G	4	Terry Woods	5 ft 9 in (1.75 m)	—	Jr
F	25	Elmer Robinson	6 ft 5 in (1.96 m)	—	Sr
G	30	Marc Urquhart (C)	6 ft 4 in (1.93 m)	—	Sr
G	12	Jay Goodman	6 ft 0 in (1.83 m)	—
C		Darryl Spinks	6 ft 8 in (2.03 m)	—
F	32	Adrian Moore	6 ft 4 in (1.93 m)	—	Jr
F	43	Paul Doerrfeld	6 ft 7 in (2.01 m)	—	Jr
G	3	Brian Pearson	6 ft 2 in (1.88 m)	—	Fr
G	23	Hughes Suffren	6 ft 2 in (1.88 m)	—
C	51	Bryan Heger	6 ft 9 in (2.06 m)	—	Jr
		Norman Brown	—	—
F		Phil Kunz	6 ft 9 in (2.06 m)	—

Head coach

- Johnny Orr (Beloit)

Assistant coach(es)

Legend

- (C) Team captain
- (S) Suspended
- (I) Ineligible
- (W) Walk-on
- Injured
- Current redshirt

== Schedule and results ==
Date time, TV	Rank^{#}	Opponent^{#}	Result	Record	Site city, state
Exhibition
Nov 17, 1988*; 7:00 pm		Denmark National Team; Exhibition	W 106–58	0–1	Hilton Coliseum; Ames, Iowa
Regular season
Nov 26, 1988*; 1:00 pm, CTN		Houston	L 82–89	0–1	Hilton Coliseum; Ames, Iowa
Nov 29, 1988*; 8:05 pm, CTN		at Creighton	W 88–58	1–1	Omaha Civic Auditorium; Omaha, Nebraska
Dec 3, 1988*; 1:00 pm, CTN		Drake; Iowa Big Four	W 80–66	2–1	Hilton Coliseum; Ames, Iowa
Dec 5, 1988*; 7:00 pm		Baylor	W 83–73	3–1	Hilton Coliseum; Ames, Iowa
Dec 10, 1988*; 8:00 pm, ITN		at No. 5 Iowa; Rivalry	L 71–91	3–2	Carver–Hawkeye Arena; Iowa City, Iowa
Exhibition
Dec 16, 1988*; 3:00 am CT		vs. Mitsubishi Electric Corp; Exhibition	W 88–84		Aoyama Gakuin University Gymnasium; Tokyo, Japan
Regular season
Dec 17, 1988*; 12:30 am CT		vs. Southern Mississippi; Phenix NCAA Ball Tournament	W 74–72	4-2	Aoyama Gakuin University Gymnasium; Tokyo, Japan
Dec 17, 1988*; 10:30 pm CT		vs. Bradley; Phenix NCAA Ball Tournament	W 99–97	5-2	Aoyama Gakuin University Gymnasium; Tokyo, Japan
Dec 28, 1988*; 7:00 pm, CTN		vs. UC-Santa Barbara; Kactus Klassic	L 78–88	5-3	University Activity Center; Tempe, Arizona
Dec 29, 1988*; 7:00 pm, CTN		vs. San Francisco; Kactus Klassic	W 99–73	6-3	University Activity Center; Tempe, Arizona
Jan 4, 1989*; 7:00 pm, CTN		Northern Iowa; Iowa Big Four	W 88–80	7-3	Hilton Coliseum; Ames, Iowa
Jan 7, 1989; 7:00 pm, Raycom		at No. 20 Kansas	L 82–127	7–4 (0–1)	Allen Fieldhouse; Lawrence, Kansas
Jan 9, 1989*; 8:00 pm, CTN		Illinois-Chicago	W 111–93	8–4	Hilton Coliseum; Ames, Iowa
Jan 11, 1989; 9:00 pm, ESPN		Colorado	W 81–77 ^{OT}	9–4 (1–1)	Hilton Coliseum; Ames, Iowa
Jan 14, 1989; 3:00 pm, Raycom		at No. 10 Missouri	L 71–96	9–5 (1–2)	Hearnes Center; Columbia, Missouri
Exhibition
Jan 17, 1989*; 7:00 pm		Marathon Oil; Exhibition	W 99–93		Hilton Coliseum (13,613); Ames, Iowa
Regular season
Jan 21, 1989; 3:00 pm, Raycom		No. 5 Oklahoma	L 100–109 ^{OT}	9–6 (1–3)	Hilton Coliseum; Ames, Iowa
Jan 25, 1989*; 7:00 pm, CTN		Western Illinois	W 114–74	10–6	Hilton Coliseum; Ames, Iowa
Jan 28, 1989; 7:30 pm, CTN		at Oklahoma State	L 74–102	10–7 (1–4)	Gallagher-Iba Arena; Stillwater, Oklahoma
Jan 31, 1989; 7:00 pm, CTN		Nebraska	W 88–76	11–7 (2–4)	Hilton Coliseum; Ames, Iowa
Feb 6, 1989; 8:00 pm, CTN		at No. 1 Oklahoma	L 97–126	11–8 (2–5)	Lloyd Noble Center; Norman, Oklahoma
Feb 9, 1989; 8:00 pm, CTN		at Kansas State	L 89–104	11–9 (2–6)	Bramlage Coliseum; Manhattan, Kansas
Feb 14, 1989; 7:00 pm, CTN		No. 3 Missouri	W 82–74	12–9 (3–6)	Hilton Coliseum; Ames, Iowa
Feb 18, 1989; 3:00 pm, Raycom		Oklahoma State	W 90–81	13–9 (4–6)	Hilton Coliseum; Ames, Iowa
Feb 22, 1989; 7:00 pm, CTN		Kansas	W 97–89	14–9 (5–6)	Hilton Coliseum; Ames, Iowa
Feb 25, 1989; 1:00 pm, Raycom		at Nebraska	L 74–77	14–10 (5–7)	Devaney Sports Center; Lincoln, Nebraska
Mar 1, 1989; 8:00 pm, CTN		at Colorado	W 83–68	15–10 (6–7)	Coors Events Center; Boulder, Colorado
Mar 4, 1989; 3:00 pm, Raycom		Kansas State	W 101–89	16–10 (7–7)	Hilton Coliseum; Ames, Iowa
Big Eight tournament
Mar 10, 1989*; 12:10 pm, Raycom		vs. Oklahoma State; Big Eight tournament Quarterfinal	W 88–69	17–10	Kemper Arena; Kansas City, Missouri
Mar 11, 1989*; 1:00 pm, Raycom		vs. No. 2 Oklahoma; Big Eight tournament semifinal	L 74–76	17–11	Kemper Arena; Kansas City, Missouri
NCAA Tournament
Mar 17, 1989*; 8:37 pm, CBS	(10 SE)	vs. (7 SE) UCLA; NCAA tournament Southeast Region First Round	L 74–84	17–12	Omni Coliseum; Atlanta
*Non-conference game. ^{#}Rankings from AP poll. (#) Tournament seedings in parentheses. SE=Southeast. All times are in Central Time.
