= 1988–89 Louisville Cardinals men's basketball team =

American college basketball season

1988–89 Louisville Cardinals men's basketball

Metro Conference tournament championship

NCAA men's Division I tournament, Sweet Sixteen
- Conference: Metro Conference (1975–1995)

Ranking
- Coaches: No. 13
- AP: No. 12
- Record: 24–9 (8–4 Metro)
- Head coach: Denny Crum (18th season)
- Assistant coaches: Wade Houston; Jerry Jones; Scooter McCray
- MVP: Pervis Ellison
- Home arena: Freedom Hall

1988–89 Metro Conference men's basketball standings
	Conf.				Overall
Team	W		L	PCT	W		L	PCT
No. 16 Florida State	9	–	3	.750	22	–	8	.733
No. 12 Louisville †	8	–	4	.667	24	–	9	.727
Memphis State	8	–	4	.667	21	–	11	.656
South Carolina	8	–	4	.667	19	–	11	.633
Cincinnati	5	–	7	.417	15	–	12	.556
Virginia Tech	2	–	10	.167	11	–	17	.393
Southern Miss	2	–	10	.167	10	–	17	.370
† 1989 Metro Conference tournament winner Rankings from AP poll

The 1988–89 Louisville Cardinals men's basketball team represented the University of Louisville in the 1988–89 NCAA Division I men's basketball season. The Cardinals scored 24 wins and 8 losses. They played in the Metro Conference and finished in the "Sweet Sixteen" of the NCAA Division I men's basketball tournament. Their player Pervis Ellison won several individual awards.

== Roster ==
1988–89 Louisville Cardinals men's basketball team
Players
Coaches

Pos.	#	Name	Height	Weight	Year	Hometown
SF	21	Kenny Payne	6 ft 8 in (2.03 m)	195 lb (88 kg)	Sr	Northeast Jones	Laurel, Mississippi
SG	23	LaBradford Smith	6 ft 3 in (1.91 m)	195 lb (88 kg)	So	Bay City	Bay City, Texas
PF	43	Pervis Ellison	6 ft 9 in (2.06 m)	210 lb (95 kg)	Sr	Savannah	Savannah, Georgia
C	50	Felton Spencer	7 ft 0 in (2.13 m)	255 lb (116 kg)	Jr	Eastern	Louisville, Kentucky

Head coach

- Denny Crum (UCLA)

Assistant coach(es)

- Wade Houston
- Jerry Jones
- Scooter McCray

Legend

- (C) Team captain
- (S) Suspended
- (I) Ineligible
- (W) Walk-on
- Injured
- Current redshirt

== Schedule and results ==
Date time, TV	Rank^{#}	Opponent^{#}	Result	Record	Site city, state
Regular season
Nov 18, 1988*	No. 4	at Xavier	L 83–85	0–1	Riverfront Coliseum; Cincinnati, OH
Nov 30, 1988*	No. 13	at Vanderbilt	L 62–65	0–2	Memorial Gymnasium; Nashville, TN
Dec 3, 1988*	No. 13	vs. Indiana	W 101–79	1–2	RCA Dome; Indianapolis, IN
Dec 6, 1988*	No. 15	Murray State	W 83–51	2–2	Freedom Hall; Louisville, KY
Dec 8, 1988*	No. 15	at Western Kentucky	W 81–69	3–2	E.A. Diddle Arena; Bowling Green, KY
Dec 10, 1988*	No. 15	Dayton	W 95–68	4–2	Freedom Hall; Louisville, KY
Dec 17, 1988*	No. 15	Oklahoma State	W 92–90	5–2	Freedom Hall; Louisville, KY
Dec 21, 1988*	No. 14	Eastern Kentucky	W 76–40	6–2	Freedom Hall; Louisville, KY
Dec 31, 1988*	No. 14	Kentucky	W 97–75	7–2	Freedom Hall; Louisville, KY
Jan 4, 1989*	No. 13	Virginia	W 74–71	8–2	Freedom Hall; Louisville, KY
Jan 7, 1989*	No. 13	DePaul	W 81–67	9–2	Freedom Hall; Louisville, KY
Jan 9, 1989	No. 13	at Virginia Tech	W 82–73	10–2 (1–0)	Cassell Coliseum; Blacksburg, VA
Jan 11, 1989	No. 9	South Carolina	W 75–52	11–2 (2–0)	Freedom Hall; Louisville, KY
Jan 15, 1989*	No. 9	at No. 19 Georgia Tech	W 67–65	12–2	Alexander Memorial Coliseum; Atlanta, GA
Jan 22, 1989*	No. 4	No. 10 UNLV	W 92–74	13–2	Freedom Hall; Louisville, KY
Jan 26, 1989	No. 3	at Southern Miss	W 95–76	14–2 (3–0)	Reed Green Coliseum; Hattiesburg, MS
Jan 29, 1989*	No. 3	No. 17 Ohio State	L 79–85	14–3	Freedom Hall; Louisville, KY
Feb 1, 1989	No. 7	Virginia Tech	W 108–95	15–3 (4–0)	Freedom Hall; Louisville, KY
Feb 4, 1989	No. 7	at Memphis State	W 101–85	16–3 (5–0)	Mid-South Coliseum; Memphis, TN
Feb 6, 1989	No. 7	No. 8 Florida State	L 78–81	16–4 (5–1)	Freedom Hall; Louisville, KY
Feb 8, 1989	No. 4	at Cincinnati	W 69–66	17–4 (6–1)	Cincinnati Gardens; Cincinnati, OH
Feb 12, 1989*	No. 4	at UCLA	L 75–77	17–5	Pauley Pavilion; Los Angeles, CA
Feb 16, 1989	No. 10	at No. 7 Florida State	W 78–77	18–5 (7–1)	Donald L. Tucker Center; Tallahassee, FL
Feb 20, 1989	No. 10	Memphis State	L 67–72	18–6 (7–2)	Freedom Hall; Louisville, KY
Feb 22, 1989	No. 8	Southern Miss	W 96–83	19–6 (8–2)	Freedom Hall; Chicago, IL
Feb 25, 1989	No. 8	at South Carolina	L 73–77	19–7 (8–3)	Carolina Coliseum; Columbia, SC
Mar 1, 1989	No. 14	Cincinnati	L 71–77	19–8 (8–4)	Freedom Hall; Louisville, KY
Mar 4, 1989*	No. 14	at Notre Dame	W 87–77	20–8	Joyce Center; Notre Dame, IN
Metro Conference tournament
Mar 10, 1989*	No. 16	vs. Memphis State; Semifinal	W 71–70	21–8	Carolina Coliseum; Columbia, SC
Mar 11, 1989*	No. 16	vs. No. 14 Florida State; Championship	W 87–80	22–8	Carolina Coliseum; Columbia, SC
NCAA Tournament
Mar 16, 1989*	(4 MW) No. 12	vs. (13 MW) Arkansas–Little Rock; First round	W 76–71	23–8	RCA Dome; Indianapolis, IN
Mar 18, 1989*	(4 MW) No. 12	vs. (5 MW) Arkansas; Second round	W 93–84	24–8	RCA Dome; Indianapolis, IN
Mar 24, 1988*	(4 MW) No. 12	vs. (1 MW) No. 4 Illinois; Regional semifinal	L 69–83	24–9	Hubert H. Humphrey Metrodome (33,560); Minneapolis, MN
*Non-conference game. ^{#}Rankings from AP. (#) Tournament seedings in parentheses. MW=Midwest. All times are in EST.

== Rankings ==
Ranking movements Legend: ██ Increase in ranking ██ Decrease in ranking — = Not ranked
	Week																	
Poll	Pre	1	2	3	4	5	6	7	8	9	10	11	12	13	14	15	16	Final
AP Poll	4	12	13	15	15	14	14	13	9	4	3	7	4	10	8	14	16	12
Coaches Poll	10	—	16	14	16	15	14	11	9	3	3	7	4	10	9	14	15	13

== Awards and honors ==
- Pervis Ellison : Metro Conference tournament Most Outstanding Player

Individual All-America teams

- Pervis Ellison : 1989 Consensus All-America first team
- Pervis Ellison : First team All-American by NABC and USBWA
- Pervis Ellison : Second team All-American by Associated Press and UPI

== Team players drafted into the NBA ==
Round	Pick	Player	NBA club
1	1	Pervis Ellison	Sacramento Kings
1	19	Kenny Payne	Philadelphia 76ers

== See also ==
- 1989 NCAA Division I men's basketball tournament
