= 1989 Missouri Valley Conference men's basketball tournament =

- Classification: Division I
- Season: 1988–89
- Teams: 8
- Site: Levitt Arena; Wichita, Kansas
- Champions: Creighton (3rd title)
- Winning coach: Tony Barone (1st title)
- MVP: Chad Gallagher (Creighton)

1988–89 Missouri Valley Conference men's basketball standings
	Conf.				Overall
Team	W		L	PCT	W		L	PCT
Creighton †	11	–	3	.786	20	–	11	.645
Wichita State	10	–	4	.714	19	–	11	.633
Tulsa	10	–	4	.714	18	–	13	.581
Bradley	7	–	7	.500	13	–	14	.481
Drake	6	–	8	.429	12	–	17	.414
Southern Illinois	6	–	8	.429	20	–	14	.588
Illinois State	6	–	8	.429	13	–	17	.433
Indiana State	0	–	14	.000	4	–	24	.143
† 1989 MVC tournament winner Rankings from AP Poll

The 1989 Missouri Valley Conference men's basketball tournament was played after the conclusion of the 1988–1989 regular season at Levitt Arena on the campus of Wichita State University in Wichita, Kansas.

The Creighton Bluejays defeated the Southern Illinois Salukis in the championship game, 79–77, and as a result won their 3rd MVC Tournament title and earned an automatic bid to the 1989 NCAA tournament.

== Bracket ==
Quarterfinals; March 5, 1989
1	Creighton	87
8	Indiana State	70
4	Bradley	75
5	Drake	77
2	Wichita State	60
7	Illinois State	66
3	Tulsa	66
6	Southern Illinois	73

Semifinals; March 6, 1989
1	Creighton	54
5	Drake	49
7	Illinois State	61
6	Southern Illinois	69

Final; March 7, 1989
1	Creighton	79
6	Southern Illinois	77
