= 1988–89 Memphis State Tigers men's basketball team =

American college basketball season

1988–89 Memphis State Tigers men's basketball

NCAA tournament
- Conference: Metro Conference (1975–1995)
- Record: 21–11 (8–4 Metro)
- Head coach: Larry Finch (3rd season)
- Home arena: Mid-South Coliseum

1988–89 Metro Conference men's basketball standings
	Conf.				Overall
Team	W		L	PCT	W		L	PCT
No. 16 Florida State	9	–	3	.750	22	–	8	.733
No. 12 Louisville †	8	–	4	.667	24	–	9	.727
Memphis State	8	–	4	.667	21	–	11	.656
South Carolina	8	–	4	.667	19	–	11	.633
Cincinnati	5	–	7	.417	15	–	12	.556
Virginia Tech	2	–	10	.167	11	–	17	.393
Southern Miss	2	–	10	.167	10	–	17	.370
† 1989 Metro Conference tournament winner Rankings from AP poll

The 1988–89 Memphis State Tigers men's basketball team represented Memphis State University as a member of the Metro Conference during the 1988–89 NCAA Division I men's basketball season.

The Tigers received an at-large bid to the 1989 NCAA tournament and finished with a 21–11 record (8–4 Metro).

== Roster ==
1988–89 Memphis State Tigers men's basketball team
Players	Coaches
Pos. / # / Name / Height / Weight / Year / Hometown; G / 34 / Elliot Perry / 6 ft 0 in (1.83 m) / — / So / Memphis, Tennessee	Head coach: Larry Finch (Memphis); Assistant coach(es) Legend: (C) Team captain; (S) Suspended; (I) Ineligible; (W) Walk-on; Injured; Current redshirt; Roster; Last update: April 12, 2020

== Schedule and results ==
Date time, TV	Rank^{#}	Opponent^{#}	Result	Record	Site city, state
Regular season
Nov 25, 1988*		at Chaminade; Maui Invitational	W 88–44	1–0	Lahaina Civic Center; Lahaina, Hawaii
Nov 26, 1988*		vs. No. 3 Michigan; Maui Invitational	L 75–79	1–1	Lahaina Civic Center; Lahaina, Hawaii
Nov 27, 1988*		vs. No. 8 UNLV; Maui Invitational	L 86–90	1–2	Lahaina Civic Center; Lahaina, Hawaii
Dec 4, 1988*		Grambling	W 84–63	2–2	Mid-South Coliseum; Memphis, Tennessee
Dec 6, 1988*		Bradley	W 84–77	3–2	Mid-South Coliseum; Memphis, Tennessee
Dec 10, 1988*		at No. 11 Missouri	L 74–86	3–3	Hearnes Center; Columbia, Missouri
Dec 15, 1988*		at New Orleans	W 92–61	4–3	Lakefront Arena; New Orleans, Louisiana
Dec 17, 1988*		at Washington	L 88–89	4–4	Bank of America Arena; Seattle, Washington
Dec 20, 1988*		Dartmouth	W 79–75	5–4	Mid-South Coliseum; Memphis, Tennessee
Dec 23, 1988*		Oral Roberts	W 70–62	6–4	Mid-South Coliseum; Memphis, Tennessee
Dec 28, 1988*		vs. Illinois State; Volunteer Classic	W 68–45	7–4	Thompson-Boling Arena; Knoxville, Tennessee
Dec 29, 1988*		at No. 19 Tennessee; Volunteer Classic	L 74–76	7–5	Thompson-Boling Arena; Knoxville, Tennessee
Jan 4, 1989		at Southern Miss	W 90–87	8–5 (1–0)	Reed Green Coliseum; Hattiesburg, Mississippi
Jan 7, 1989		at Cincinnati	L 79–89	8–6 (1–1)	Cincinnati Gardens; Cincinnati, Ohio
Jan 9, 1989*		Saint Louis	W 80–73	9–6	Mid-South Coliseum; Memphis, Tennessee
Jan 14, 1989		Virginia Tech	W 91–83	10–6 (2–1)	Mid-South Coliseum; Memphis, Tennessee
Jan 18, 1989		at South Carolina	L 66–78	10–7 (2–2)	Carolina Coliseum; Columbia, South Carolina
Jan 21, 1989*		at New Orleans	W 73–72	11–7	Lakefront Arena; New Orleans, Louisiana
Jan 26, 1989*		Tulsa	W 77–59	12–7	Mid-South Coliseum; Memphis, Tennessee
Jan 28, 1989*		Virginia Commonwealth	W 89–69	13–7	Mid-South Coliseum; Memphis, Tennessee
Feb 1, 1989		at No. 8 Florida State	W 99–82	14–7 (3–2)	Donald L. Tucker Center; Tallahassee, Florida
Feb 4, 1989		No. 7 Louisville	L 85–101	14–8 (3–3)	Mid-South Coliseum; Memphis, Tennessee
Feb 6, 1989*		Tennessee State	W 85–63	15–8	Mid-South Coliseum; Memphis, Tennessee
Feb 8, 1989*		at Murray State	W 73–62	16–8	Racer Arena; Murray, Kentucky
Feb 11, 1989		South Carolina	W 63–48	17–8 (4–3)	Mid-South Coliseum; Chicago, IL
Feb 15, 1989		Cincinnati	W 81–71	18–8 (5–3)	Mid-South Coliseum; Memphis, Tennessee
Feb 18, 1989		No. 7 Florida State	W 89–79	19–8 (6–3)	Mid-South Coliseum; Memphis, Tennessee
Feb 20, 1989		at No. 10 Louisville	W 72–67	20–8 (7–3)	Freedom Hall; Louisville, Kentucky
Feb 25, 1989		Southern Miss	W 83–76	21–8 (8–3)	Mid-South Coliseum; Memphis, Tennessee
Mar 4, 1989		at Virginia Tech	L 73–78	21–9 (8–4)	Cassell Coliseum; Blacksburg, Virginia
Metro Conference Tournament
Mar 10, 1989*		vs. No. 16 Louisville; Metro Tournament Quarterfinal	L 70–71	21–10	Carolina Coliseum; Columbia, South Carolina
NCAA Tournament
Mar 16, 1989*	(5 W)	vs. (12 W) DePaul; First Round	L 63–66	21–11	BSU Pavilion; Boise, Idaho
*Non-conference game. ^{#}Rankings from AP Poll. (#) Tournament seedings in parentheses. W=West. All times are in Eastern Time.
