= 1988–89 Oklahoma Sooners men's basketball team =

American college basketball season

1988–89 Oklahoma Sooners men's basketball

Big 8 Conference regular season Champions

NCAA men's Division I tournament, #1 Seed, Sweet Sixteen
- Conference: Big 8 Conference

Ranking
- Coaches: No. 5
- AP: No. 4
- Record: 30–6 (12–2 Big 8)
- Head coach: Billy Tubbs (9th season)
- Assistant coaches: Mike Mims; Jim Kerwin (5th season); Mike Anderson
- Home arena: Lloyd Noble Center (Capacity: 11,528)

1988–89 Big Eight Conference men's basketball standings
	Conf.				Overall
Team	W		L	PCT	W		L	PCT
No. 4 Oklahoma	12	–	2	.857	30	–	6	.833
No. 6 Missouri †	10	–	4	.714	29	–	8	.784
Kansas State	8	–	6	.571	19	–	11	.633
Oklahoma State	7	–	7	.500	17	–	13	.567
Iowa State	7	–	7	.500	17	–	12	.586
Kansas	6	–	8	.429	19	–	12	.613
Nebraska	4	–	10	.286	17	–	16	.515
Colorado	2	–	12	.143	7	–	21	.250
† 1989 Big Eight tournament winner As of March 3, 2012; Rankings from AP poll

The 1988–89 Oklahoma Sooners men's basketball team represented the University of Oklahoma in competitive college basketball during the 1988–89 NCAA Division I season. The Oklahoma Sooners men's basketball team played its home games in the Lloyd Noble Center and was a member of the National Collegiate Athletic Association's (NCAA) former Big Eight Conference at that time. The team posted a 30–6 overall record and a 12–2 conference record to earn the Conference title under head coach Billy Tubbs. This was the fourth Big Eight Conference regular season Championship for Tubbs and his second in a row.

The team was led by two future 1989 NBA draft first round selections Stacey King and Mookie Blaylock who were both selected as 1989 NCAA Men's Basketball All-Americans. The team won two of its three games at the 1988 Maui Invitational Tournament where it faced three ranked opponents: #16 Ohio State, #4 UNLV and #3 Michigan who defeated them and eventually won the 1989 NCAA Division I men's basketball tournament. The team then won 11 games in a row before losing to unranked Pitt. The team then won five in a row including victories over #16 Kansas and then #13 UNLV before losing to unranked Oklahoma State. The Sooners, who were ranked in the top 10 all season and the top 5 for the entire 1989 part of its schedule, then won six more in a row including back to back wins against #3 Missouri and #1 Arizona. #7 Missouri ended the streak and gave Oklahoma its final regular season loss. Oklahoma won its final two regular season games and first two Big Eight tournament games before losing its rubber match against #10 Missouri in the championship game. The team earned a second consecutive #1 seed for the NCAA Division I men's basketball tournament where it advanced to the sweet sixteen before losing to Virginia.

Mookie Blaylock established the current Oklahoma Sooners men's basketball single-season minutes played (1359) and career steals (281) records. His career steals per game record (3.8) stood as a National Collegiate Athletic Association Division I college basketball record for 13 seasons. He also tied his own NCAA single-game steals record (13). Stacey King set the current Sooners single-season free throws made (211) record. King also set the Big Eight career blocked shots record (228). Tyrone Jones became the first Sooner to make 6 consecutive three point shots (a record since tied by 4 other Sooners). The team holds the Sooner record with 20 100-point games.

== Roster ==
1988–89 Oklahoma Sooners men's basketball team
Players
Coaches

Pos.	#	Name	Height	Weight	Year	Previous school	Hometown
F	21	Mike Bell	6 ft 5 in (1.96 m)	201 lb (91 kg)	Sr	Robert E. Lee	Montgomery, AL
G	10	Mookie Blaylock	6 ft 0 in (1.83 m)	177 lb (80 kg)	Sr	Garland	Garland, TX
G	23	Chris Durley	6 ft 3 in (1.91 m)	210 lb (95 kg)		Douglass	Oklahoma City, OK
G/F	30	Skeeter Henry	6 ft 7 in (2.01 m)	171 lb (78 kg)	Jr	Midland College	Grand Prairie, TX
F	55	Darryl Johnson	6 ft 5 in (1.96 m)	218 lb (99 kg)	So	Yates	Houston, TX
F	22	Tyrone Jones	6 ft 5 in (1.96 m)	215 lb (98 kg)	Sr	Dunbar	Washington, D.C.
C	33	Stacey King	6 ft 10 in (2.08 m)	229 lb (104 kg)	Sr	Lawton	Lawton, OK
F	50	Tony Martin	6 ft 7 in (2.01 m)	230 lb (104 kg)		Manual Arts	Los Angeles, CA
G	24	Terrence Mullins	6 ft 2 in (1.88 m)	198 lb (90 kg)	So	Riordan	San Francisco, CA
G	20	Art Pollard	6 ft 2 in (1.88 m)	184 lb (83 kg)	Sr	Roosevelt	East Chicago, IN
G	11	Jason Skurcenski	6 ft 2 in (1.88 m)	172 lb (78 kg)	So	Bartlesville	Bartlesville, OK
F	32	Andre Wiley	6 ft 5 in (1.96 m)	197 lb (89 kg)	Sr	Southwestern	Flint, MI

Head coach

- Billy Tubbs

Assistant coach(es)

- Mike Mims
- Jim Kerwin

Legend

- (C) Team captain
- (S) Suspended
- (I) Ineligible
- (W) Walk-on
- Injured
- Current redshirt

Roster
Last update: March 22, 2020

== Schedule and results ==
Date time, TV	Rank^{#}	Opponent^{#}	Result	Record	Site (attendance) city, state
Regular season
Nov 25, 1988*	No. 4	vs. No. 16 Ohio State; Maui Invitational	W 97–93	1–0	Lahaina Civic Center; Lahaina, Hawaii
Nov 26, 1988*	No. 4	vs. No. 8 UNLV; Maui Invitational	W 83–81	2–0	Lahaina Civic Center; Lahaina, Hawaii
Nov 27, 1988*	No. 4	vs. No. 3 Michigan; Maui Invitational	L 80–91	2–1	Lahaina Civic Center; Lahaina, Hawaii
Nov 30, 1988*	No. 5	Southern Methodist	W 104–87	3–1	Lloyd Noble Center; Norman, Oklahoma
Dec 8, 1988*	No. 6	at New Mexico	W 100–96	4–1	University Arena ("The Pit"); Albuquerque, New Mexico
Dec 10, 1988*	No. 6	Oral Roberts	W 152–122	5–1	Lloyd Noble Center; Norman, Oklahoma
Dec 17, 1988*	No. 7	Loyola Marymount	W 136–103	6–1	Lloyd Noble Center; Norman, Oklahoma
Dec 20, 1988*	No. 7	Southern Utah	W 132–64	7–1	Lloyd Noble Center; Norman, Oklahoma
Dec 22, 1988*	No. 7	Arkansas-Little Rock	W 115–96	8–1	Lloyd Noble Center; Norman, Oklahoma
Dec 29, 1988*	No. 6	vs. Texas A&M; All-College Tournament	W 128–80	9–1	Myriad Convention Center; Oklahoma City, Oklahoma
Dec 30, 1988*	No. 6	vs. Texas; All-College Tournament	W 124–95	10–1	Myriad Convention Center; Oklahoma City, Oklahoma
Jan 3, 1989*	No. 4	Sam Houston State	W 111–66	11–1	Lloyd Noble Center; Norman, Oklahoma
Jan 7, 1989*	No. 4	UNC Charlotte	W 94–86	12–1	Lloyd Noble Center; Norman, Oklahoma
Jan 9, 1989	No. 4	at Nebraska	W 89–81	13–1 (1–0)	Bob Devaney Sports Center; Lincoln, Nebraska
Jan 15, 1989*	No. 3	at Pittsburgh	L 91–99	13–2	Fitzgerald Field House; Pittsburgh, Pennsylvania
Jan 18, 1989	No. 5	No. 17 Kansas	W 123–95	14–2 (2–0)	Lloyd Noble Center; Norman, Oklahoma
Jan 21, 1989	No. 5	at Iowa State	W 109–100 ^{OT}	15–2 (3–0)	Hilton Coliseum; Ames, Iowa
Jan 25, 1989	No. 4	Colorado	W 122–86	16–2 (4–0)	Lloyd Noble Center; Norman, Oklahoma
Jan 30, 1989*	No. 4	at No. 13 UNLV	W 90–88	17–2	Thomas & Mack Center; Las Vegas, Nevada
Feb 1, 1989	No. 1	at Kansas State	W 90–82	18–2 (5–0)	Bramlage Coliseum; Manhattan, Kansas
Feb 4, 1989	No. 1	at Oklahoma State	L 73–77	18–3 (5–1)	Gallagher-Iba Arena; Stillwater, Oklahoma
Feb 6, 1989	No. 1	Iowa State	W 126–97	19–3 (6–1)	Lloyd Noble Center; Norman, Oklahoma
Feb 9, 1989	No. 5	No. 3 Missouri	W 112–105	20–3 (7–1)	Lloyd Noble Center (11,734); Norman, Oklahoma
Feb 12, 1989*	No. 5	No. 1 Arizona	W 82–80	21–3	Lloyd Noble Center; Norman, Oklahoma
Feb 15, 1989	No. 1	at Kansas	W 94–89 ^{OT}	22–3 (8–1)	Allen Fieldhouse; Lawrence, Kansas
Feb 18, 1989	No. 1	at Colorado	W 106–88	23–3 (9–1)	CU Events/Conference Center; Boulder, Colorado
Feb 22, 1989	No. 1	Kansas State	W 86–82	24–3 (10–1)	Lloyd Noble Center; Norman, Oklahoma
Feb 25, 1989	No. 1	at No. 7 Missouri	L 84–97	24–4 (10–2)	Hearnes Center; Columbia, Missouri
Mar 1, 1989	No. 4	Oklahoma State	W 111–108	25–4 (11–2)	Lloyd Noble Center; Norman, Oklahoma
Mar 4, 1989	No. 4	Nebraska	W 103–76	26–4 (12–2)	Lloyd Noble Center; Norman, Oklahoma
Big Eight Conference tournament
Mar 10, 1989*	(1) No. 2	vs. (8) Colorado; Quarterfinal	W 95–87 ^{2OT}	27–4	Kemper Arena; Kansas City, Missouri
Mar 11, 1989*	(1) No. 2	vs. (5) Iowa State; Semifinal	W 76–74	28–4	Kemper Arena; Kansas City, Missouri
Mar 12, 1989*; ABC	(1) No. 2	vs. (2) No. 10 Missouri; Championship	L 86–98	28–5	Kemper Arena; Kansas City, Missouri
NCAA tournament
Mar 16, 1989*	(1 SE) No. 4	vs. (16 SE) East Tennessee State; First round	W 72–71	29–5	Memorial Gymnasium; Nashville, Tennessee
Mar 18, 1989*	(1 SE) No. 4	vs. (9 SE) Louisiana Tech; Second Round	W 124–81	30–5	Memorial Gymnasium; Nashville, Tennessee
Mar 23, 1989*	(1 SE) No. 4	vs. (5 SE) Virginia; Southeast Regional semifinal	L 80–86	30–6	Rupp Arena (22,314); Lexington, Kentucky
*Non-conference game. ^{#}Rankings from AP Poll. (#) Tournament seedings in parentheses. SE=Southeast. All times are in Central.

=== NCAA basketball tournament ===
The following is a summary of the team's performance in the NCAA Division I men's basketball tournament:

- Southeast
  - Oklahoma (1) 72, East Tennessee State (16) 71
  - Oklahoma 124, Louisiana Tech (9) 81
  - Virginia (5) 86, Oklahoma 80 (Sweet 16)

== Honors ==
- All-American: Mookie Blaylock and Stacey King (2nd selection)
- Big Eight POY: King

== Team players drafted into the NBA ==
The following players were drafted in the 1989 NBA draft:

Round	Pick	Player	Position	NBA club
1	6	Stacey King	Center	Chicago Bulls
1	12	Mookie Blaylock	Guard	New Jersey Nets

== See also ==
- Oklahoma Sooners men's basketball
- List of Oklahoma Sooners men's basketball conference championships
- 1989 NCAA Division I men's basketball tournament
