= 1988–89 South Carolina Gamecocks men's basketball team =

American college basketball season

1988–89 South Carolina Gamecocks men's basketball

NCAA tournament
- Conference: Metro Conference (1975–1995)
- Record: 19–11 (8–4 Metro)
- Head coach: George Felton (3rd season)
- Assistant coaches: Tubby Smith (3rd season); Eddie Payne (3rd season); Scott Rigot
- Home arena: Carolina Coliseum

1988–89 Metro Conference men's basketball standings
	Conf.				Overall
Team	W		L	PCT	W		L	PCT
No. 16 Florida State	9	–	3	.750	22	–	8	.733
No. 12 Louisville †	8	–	4	.667	24	–	9	.727
Memphis State	8	–	4	.667	21	–	11	.656
South Carolina	8	–	4	.667	19	–	11	.633
Cincinnati	5	–	7	.417	15	–	12	.556
Virginia Tech	2	–	10	.167	11	–	17	.393
Southern Miss	2	–	10	.167	10	–	17	.370
† 1989 Metro Conference tournament winner Rankings from AP poll

The 1988–89 South Carolina Gamecocks men's basketball team represented the University of South Carolina as a member of the Metro Conference during the 1988–89 men's college basketball season. The team was led by head coach George Felton and played their home games at Carolina Coliseum in Columbia, South Carolina. The team received an at-large bid to the 1989 NCAA tournament as No. 12 seed in the East region – the team's first appearance in the tournament in 15 years. The Gamecocks lost to NC State in the first round to finish the season with a record of 19–11 (8–4 Metro).

== Roster ==
1988–89 South Carolina Gamecocks men's basketball team
Players
Coaches

Pos.	#	Name	Height	Weight	Year	Hometown
F	31	Terry Dozier	6 ft 9 in (2.06 m)	205 lb (93 kg)	Sr	Baltimore, Maryland
G	4	Jo Jo English	6 ft 4 in (1.93 m)	190 lb (86 kg)	Fr
F	32	John Hudson	6 ft 8 in (2.03 m)	—	Sr
		Barry Manning	—	—
G	20	Brent Price	6 ft 1 in (1.85 m)	165 lb (75 kg)	So	Enid, Oklahoma
		Jeff Roulston	—	—

Head coach

- George Felton

Assistant coach(es)

Legend

- (C) Team captain
- (S) Suspended
- (I) Ineligible
- (W) Walk-on
- Injured
- Current redshirt

Roster
Last update: April 24, 2020

== Schedule and results ==
Date time, TV	Rank^{#}	Opponent^{#}	Result	Record	Site city, state
Regular season
Nov 26, 1988*		Lander	W 96–54	1–0	Carolina Coliseum; Columbia, South Carolina
Dec 3, 1988*		Clemson	W 90–70	2–0	Carolina Coliseum; Columbia, South Carolina
Dec 5, 1988*		Maryland	W 57–51	3–0	Carolina Coliseum; Columbia, South Carolina
Dec 7, 1988*		East Carolina	W 75–67	4–0	Carolina Coliseum; Columbia, South Carolina
Dec 17, 1988*		at No. 16 Tennessee	W 83–81 ^{OT}	5–0	Thompson-Boling Arena; Knoxville, Tennessee
Dec 20, 1988*	No. 18	No. 12 Ohio State	W 74–63	6–0	Carolina Coliseum; Columbia, South Carolina
Dec 29, 1988*	No. 16	vs. La Salle; Cotton States Classic	L 67–85	6–1	Omni Coliseum; Atlanta, Georgia
Dec 30, 1988*	No. 16	vs. Princeton; Cotton States Classic	L 58–69	6–2	Omni Coliseum; Atlanta, Georgia
Jan 2, 1989*		Augusta College	W 103–68	7–2	Carolina Coliseum; Columbia, South Carolina
Jan 7, 1989*		at Davidson	W 81–67	8–2	Charlotte Coliseum; Charlotte, North Carolina
Jan 11, 1989		at No. 9 Louisville	L 52–75	8–3 (0–1)	Freedom Hall; Louisville, Kentucky
Jan 14, 1989		Cincinnati	W 73–69	9–3 (1–1)	Carolina Coliseum; Columbia, South Carolina
Jan 18, 1989		Memphis	W 78–66	10–3 (2–1)	Carolina Coliseum; Columbia, South Carolina
Jan 21, 1989*		Youngstown State	W 92–78	11–3	Carolina Coliseum; Columbia, South Carolina
Jan 23, 1989*		Coastal Carolina	W 92–65	12–3	Carolina Coliseum; Columbia, South Carolina
Jan 26, 1989		No. 11 Florida State	L 67–69	12–4 (2–2)	Carolina Coliseum; Columbia, South Carolina
Jan 28, 1989*		at Oral Roberts	L 86–87	12–5	Mabee Center; Tulsa, Oklahoma
Feb 4, 1989*		at Clemson	L 65–78	12–6	Littlejohn Coliseum; Clemson, South Carolina
Feb 6, 1989		Southern Miss	W 105–63	13–6 (3–2)	Carolina Coliseum; Columbia, South Carolina
Feb 8, 1989		at No. 12 Florida State	L 72–88	13–7 (3–3)	Donald L. Tucker Center; Tallahassee, Florida
Feb 11, 1989		at Memphis State	L 48–63	13–8 (3–4)	Mid-South Coliseum; Memphis, Tennessee
Feb 15, 1989		Virginia Tech	W 81–70	14–8 (4–4)	Carolina Coliseum; Columbia, South Carolina
Feb 18, 1989		at Southern Miss	W 68–61	15–8 (5–4)	Reed Green Coliseum; Hattiesburg, Mississippi
Feb 22, 1989*		The Citadel	L 87–88	15–9	Carolina Coliseum; Columbia, South Carolina
Feb 25, 1989		No. 8 Louisville	W 77–73	16–9 (6–4)	Carolina Coliseum; Columbia, South Carolina
Feb 27, 1989		at Virginia Tech	W 86–79	17–9 (7–4)	Cassell Coliseum; Blacksburg, Virginia
Mar 4, 1989		at Cincinnati	W 69–68	18–9 (8–4)	Cincinnati Gardens; Cincinnati, Ohio
Metro Conference Tournament
Mar 9, 1989*		Southern Miss; Metro Conference Tournament Quarterfinal	W 63–62	19–9	Carolina Coliseum; Columbia, South Carolina
Mar 10, 1989*		No. 14 Florida State; Metro Conference Tournament Semifinal	L 63–80	19–10	Carolina Coliseum; Columbia, South Carolina
NCAA Tournament
Mar 17, 1989*	(12 E)	vs. (5 E) No. 19 NC State; First Round	L 66–81	19–11	Providence Civic Center; Providence, Rhode Island
*Non-conference game. ^{#}Rankings from AP Poll. (#) Tournament seedings in parentheses.
