= 1988–89 Wright State Raiders men's basketball team =

American college basketball season

1988–89 Wright State Raiders men's basketball
- Conference: Independent
- Record: 17–11
- Head coach: Ralph Underhill (11th season)
- Assistant coaches: Jim Brown; Bob Grote; Jeff Dillon; Tom Rhoades
- Home arena: WSU PE Building

1988–89 NCAA Division I men's basketball independents standings
	Conf.				Overall
Team	W		L	PCT	W		L	PCT
Akron		–		–	21	–	8	.724
Notre Dame		–		–	21	–	9	.700
DePaul		–		–	21	–	12	.636
Miami (FL)		–		–	19	–	12	.613
UMBC		–		–	17	–	11	.607
Wright State		–		–	17	–	11	.607
Marquette		–		–	13	–	15	.464
Mount St. Mary's		–		–	12	–	15	.444
Chicago State		–		–	12	–	16	.429
Nicholls State		–		–	12	–	16	.429
Northern Illinois		–		–	11	–	17	.393
U.S. International		–		–	11	–	17	.393
Liberty		–		–	10	–	17	.370
Central Connecticut State		–		–	10	–	18	.357
Florida International		–		–	10	–	18	.357
Southern Utah		–		–	10	–	18	.357
UMKC		–		–	9	–	18	.333
Oral Roberts		–		–	8	–	20	.286
Central Florida		–		–	7	–	20	.259
Davidson		–		–	7	–	24	.226
Youngstown State		–		–	5	–	23	.179
Brooklyn		–		–	4	–	23	.148
Southeastern Louisiana		–		–	3	–	24	.111
Rankings from AP Poll

The 1988–89 Wright State Raiders men's basketball team represented Wright State University in the 1988–89 NCAA Division I men's basketball season led by head coach Ralph Underhill.

== Season summary ==
Season two of Division I play continued the process of transition. There was optimism about the improving schedule that featured several good mid-majors. There was excitement about the new arena soon to be built on campus. The Raiders continued their high-scoring brand of basketball, averaging over 80 points a night taking on all comers. There were also the growing pains of trying to scale-up operations to compete at the big-school level and the search for a conference continued.

== Roster ==
1988–89 Wright State Raiders men's basketball team
Players
Coaches

Pos.	#	Name	Height	Weight	Year	Previous school	Hometown
F/C	24	Rondey Robinson	6 ft 7 in (2.01 m)	210 lb (95 kg)	Sr	Collins	Chicago, IL
F	45	Brad Smith	6 ft 6 in (1.98 m)	210 lb (95 kg)	Sr	Beechcroft	Columbus, OH
F	32	Dave Dinn	6 ft 6 in (1.98 m)	215 lb (98 kg)	Jr	Boone County	Florence, KY
F	23	Rob Geistwhite	6 ft 6 in (1.98 m)	195 lb (88 kg)	Jr	Woodlan	Grabill, IN
G	33	Matt Horstman	6 ft 5 in (1.96 m)	205 lb (93 kg)	Jr	Alter	Dayton, OH
G	34	Chris Wampler	6 ft 3 in (1.91 m)	170 lb (77 kg)	Jr	Tippecanoe	Tipp City, OH
F/C	44	Scott Benton	6 ft 9 in (2.06 m)	220 lb (100 kg)	So	Walton-Verona	Union, KY
C	42	Scott Wilder	6 ft 9 in (2.06 m)	235 lb (107 kg)	So	Woodlan	Woodburn, IN
G/F	43	Rob Haucke	6 ft 5 in (1.96 m)	195 lb (88 kg)	Fr	Oak Hills	Cincinnati, OH
G	20	Marc Mumphrey	6 ft 1 in (1.85 m)	185 lb (84 kg)	Fr	Carroll County	Carrollton, KY
F	35	Ron Pierce	6 ft 7 in (2.01 m)	205 lb (93 kg)	Fr	Franklin	Franklin, OH
G	22	Mark Woods	6 ft 1 in (1.85 m)	145 lb (66 kg)	Fr	Pleasure Ridge	Louisville, KY

Head coach

- Ralph Underhill

Assistant coach(es)

Jim Brown, Bob Grote, Jeff Dillon, Tom Rhoades

Legend

- (C) Team captain
- (S) Suspended
- (I) Ineligible
- (W) Walk-on
- Injured
- Current redshirt

== Schedule and results ==
Date time, TV	Rank^{#}	Opponent^{#}	Result	Record	Site city, state
Regular season
Dec 3, 1988		Middle Tennessee State	W 88-71	1–0	WSU PE Building; Fairborn, OH
Dec 5, 1988		at Central Michigan	L 87-96	1–1	Rose Arena; Mount Pleasant, MI
Dec 9, 1988		at Drake; Drake Classic	L 68-74	1–2	Veterans Auditorium; Des Moines, IA
Dec 10, 1988		vs. George Mason; Drake Classic	L 95-98 ^{2OT}	1–3	Veterans Auditorium; Des Moines, IA
Dec 13, 1988		St. Francis (NY)	W 75-74	2–3	WSU PE Building (2,026); Fairborn, OH
Dec 16, 1988		Bethune–Cookman; Wright State Invitational	L 55-64	2–4	WSU PE Building; Fairborn, OH
Dec 17, 1988		Howard; Wright State Invitational	W 76-72	3–4	WSU PE Building; Fairborn, OH
Dec 21, 1988		at Bowling Green	L 56-73	3–5	Anderson Arena; Bowling Green, OH
Dec 31, 1988		Liberty	W 105-77	4–5	WSU PE Building; Fairborn, OH
Jan 5, 1989		at Howard	W 69-67	5–5	Burr Gymnasium; Washington, D.C.
Jan 7, 1989		at Brooklyn	W 94-70	6–5	Roosevelt Gymnasium; Brooklyn, New York
Jan 11, 1989		Ashland	W 62-58	7-5	WSU PE Building; Fairborn, OH
Jan 13, 1989		Central State	W 102-70	8-5	WSU PE Building; Fairborn, OH
Jan 18, 1989		Western Illinois	W 72-65	9-5	WSU PE Building; Fairborn, OH
Jan 21, 1989		at Akron	L 78-87	9-6	JAR Arena; Akron, OH
Jan 25, 1989		Maryland-Baltimore County	W 86-81	10-6	WSU PE Building; Fairborn, OH
Jan 28, 1989		Green Bay	W 77-72	11-6	WSU PE Building; Fairborn, OH
Jan 31, 1989		Mount St. Mary’s	L 100-102	11-7	WSU PE Building; Fairborn, OH
Feb 4, 1989		Northern Illinois	L 84-85	11-8	WSU PE Building; Fairborn, OH
Feb 8, 1989		at Middle Tennessee State	L 51-83	11–9	Hale Arena; Murfreesboro, TN
Feb 11, 1989		Southern Utah	W 87-81	12–9	WSU PE Building; Fairborn, OH
Feb 13, 1989		Wilmington	W 106-88	13–9	WSU PE Building; Fairborn, OH
Feb 15, 1989		at Eastern Kentucky	W 70-65	14–9	Alumni Coliseum; Richmond, KY
Feb 18, 1989		Akron	L 70-86	14–10	WSU PE Building; Fairborn, OH
Feb 20, 1989		Brooklyn	W 118-88	15-10	WSU PE Building; Fairborn, OH
Feb 25, 1989		at Northern Illinois	L 73-82	15-11	Chick Evans Field House; DeKalb, IL
Mar 1, 1989		Youngstown State	W 105-90	16-11	WSU PE Building; Fairborn, OH
Mar 4, 1989		Milwaukee	W 105-96	17-11	WSU PE Building; Fairborn, OH
*Non-conference game. ^{#}Rankings from AP Poll. (#) Tournament seedings in parentheses. MW=Midwest.

== Awards and honors ==
Rondey Robinson	MVP
Brad Smith	MVP
Chris Wampler	Raider Award

== Statistics ==
Number	Name	Games	Average	Points	Assists	Rebounds
45	Brad Smith	28	21.7	608	48	266
42	Rondney Robinson	28	14.5	406	62	299
22	Mark Woods	27	10.0	270	156	76
20	Marcus Mumphrey	27	8.9	241	29	43
34	Chris Wampler	28	8.0	225	95	79
33	Matt Horstman	28	7.8	218	38	20
44	Scott Benton	27	6.1	164	42	98
32	Dave Dinn	4	6.0	24	5	20
35	Ron Pierce	24	2.8	67	2	39
52	Scott Wilder	20	2.2	43	1	20
23	Rob Geistwhite	14	1.9	27	11	26
43	Rob Haucke	16	1.3	21	20	8
40	Jeff Unverferth	1	0.0	0	0	0
