= 1988–89 Creighton Bluejays men's basketball team =

American college basketball season

1988–89 Creighton Bluejays men's basketball
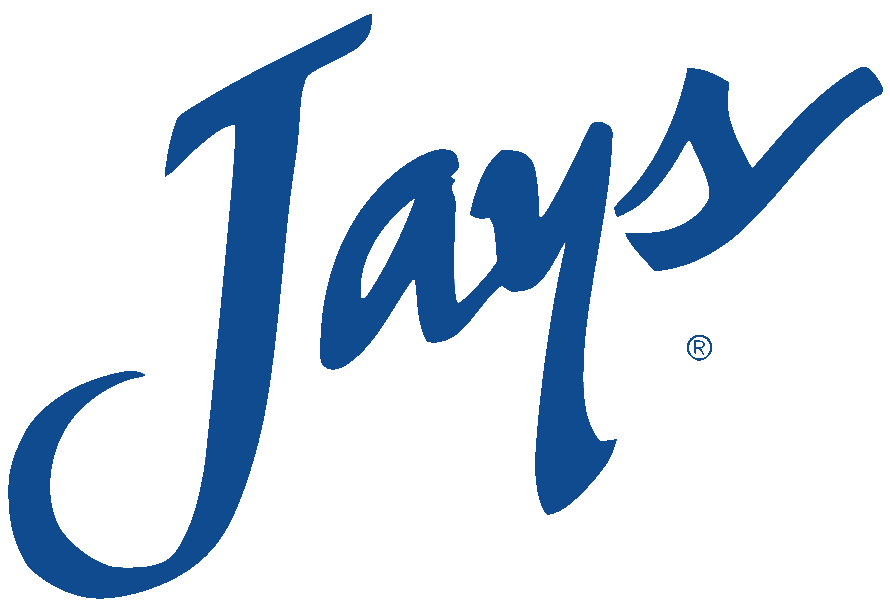

MVC Regular season champion MVC tournament champion

NCAA tournament
- Conference: Missouri Valley Conference
- Record: 20–11 (11–3 MVC)
- Head coach: Tony Barone (4th season)
- Home arena: Omaha Civic Auditorium

1988–89 Missouri Valley Conference men's basketball standings
	Conf.				Overall
Team	W		L	PCT	W		L	PCT
Creighton †	11	–	3	.786	20	–	11	.645
Wichita State	10	–	4	.714	19	–	11	.633
Tulsa	10	–	4	.714	18	–	13	.581
Bradley	7	–	7	.500	13	–	14	.481
Drake	6	–	8	.429	12	–	17	.414
Southern Illinois	6	–	8	.429	20	–	14	.588
Illinois State	6	–	8	.429	13	–	17	.433
Indiana State	0	–	14	.000	4	–	24	.143
† 1989 MVC tournament winner Rankings from AP Poll

The 1988–89 Creighton Bluejays men's basketball team represented Creighton University during the 1988–89 NCAA Division I men's basketball season. The Bluejays, led by head coach Tony Barone, played their home games at the Omaha Civic Auditorium. The Jays finished with a 20–11 record (11–3 MVC), and won the Missouri Valley Conference tournament to earn an automatic bid to the 1989 NCAA tournament.

== Roster ==
1988–89 Creighton Bluejays men's basketball team
Players
Coaches

Pos.	#	Name	Height	Weight	Year	Previous school	Hometown
G	10	Kevin Johnson	6 ft 1 in (1.85 m)	—	Fr		Columbus, Indiana
G	11	James Farr	5 ft 10 in (1.78 m)	—	Sr	Mount Carmel	Chicago, Illinois
G	14	Duan Cole	5 ft 10 in (1.78 m)	—	So		Fort Wayne, Indiana
G	15	Ed Molitor	5 ft 10 in (1.78 m)	—	Fr		Palatine, Illinois
G	20	Porter Moser	6 ft 2 in (1.88 m)	195 lb (88 kg)	Jr	Benet Academy	Naperville, Illinois
F	21	Tony Ball	6 ft 6 in (1.98 m)	200 lb (91 kg)	Jr		Tulsa, Oklahoma
G	22	Matt Roggenburk	6 ft 4 in (1.93 m)	185 lb (84 kg)	Jr		Cleveland, Ohio
G	23	Todd Eisner	6 ft 7 in (2.01 m)	210 lb (95 kg)	So		Chilton, Wisconsin
G	24	Latrell Wrightsell	6 ft 1 in (1.85 m)	170 lb (77 kg)	Fr	Roosevelt	Gary, Indiana
C	25	Chad Gallagher	6 ft 10 in (2.08 m)	245 lb (111 kg)	So	Boylan Catholic	Rockford, Illinois
F	30	Bob Harstad	6 ft 6 in (1.98 m)	220 lb (100 kg)	So	Thompson Valley	Loveland, Colorado
G/F	31	Troy Bell	6 ft 5 in (1.96 m)	—	Jr		Fort Worth, Texas
C	32	Bill O'Dowd	7 ft 0 in (2.13 m)	—	So		Miami, Florida
G	40	Dave Mohr	5 ft 10 in (1.78 m)	—	So		Manning, Iowa
F	42	Chris Rodgers	6 ft 6 in (1.98 m)	—	So		East St. Louis, Illinois

Head coach

- Tony Barone (Duke)

Assistant coach(es)

Legend

- (C) Team captain
- (S) Suspended
- (I) Ineligible
- (W) Walk-on
- Injured
- Current redshirt

Roster

== Schedule and results ==
Date time, TV	Rank^{#}	Opponent^{#}	Result	Record	Site (attendance) city, state
Regular season
Nov 26, 1988*		at Nebraska; Rivalry	L 77–86	0–1	Bob Devaney Sports Center (11,728); Lincoln, Nebraska
Nov 30, 1988*		Iowa State	L 58–88	0–2	Omaha Civic Auditorium (6,268); Omaha, Nebraska
Dec 2, 1988*		at Cleveland State	W 70–69	1–2	Woodling Gym; Cleveland, Ohio
Dec 5, 1988*		San Jose State	W 84–77	2–2	Omaha Civic Auditorium; Omaha, Nebraska
Dec 7, 1988*		at Arkansas State	L 63–71	2–3	Convocation Center; Jonesboro, Arkansas
Dec 10, 1988*		at Notre Dame	L 64–77	2–4	Joyce Center; Notre Dame, Indiana
Dec 17, 1988*		Montana	W 57–51 ^{OT}	3–4	Omaha Civic Auditorium; Omaha, Nebraska
Dec 19, 1988*		Marquette	W 79–73	4–4	Omaha Civic Auditorium; Omaha, Nebraska
Dec 22, 1988*		Montana State	W 75–69	5–4	Omaha Civic Auditorium; Omaha, Nebraska
Dec 31, 1988*		Arkansas State	L 58–69	5–5	Omaha Civic Auditorium; Omaha, Nebraska
Jan 2, 1989*		at Illinois-Chicago	L 76–78	5–6	UIC Pavilion; Chicago, Illinois
Jan 9, 1989		Illinois State	W 68–58	6–6 (1–0)	Omaha Civic Auditorium; Omaha, Nebraska
Jan 14, 1989		at Indiana State	W 76–69	7–6 (2–0)	Hulman Center; Terre Haute, Indiana
Jan 16, 1989		at Wichita State	W 81–80 ^{OT}	8–6 (3–0)	Levitt Arena; Wichita, Kansas
Jan 21, 1989		Bradley	W 94–68	9–6 (4–0)	Omaha Civic Auditorium; Omaha, Nebraska
Jan 23, 1989		at Southern Illinois	W 84–74	10–6 (5–0)	SIU Arena; Carbondale, Illinois
Jan 28, 1989		at Illinois State	L 66–76	10–7 (5–1)	Horton Field House; Normal, Illinois
Jan 30, 1989		at Bradley	W 85–68	11–7 (6–1)	Carver Arena; Peoria, Illinois
Feb 2, 1989		Tulsa	W 75–61	12–7 (7–1)	Omaha Civic Auditorium; Omaha, Nebraska
Feb 4, 1989		Drake	W 74–72	13–7 (8–1)	Omaha Civic Auditorium; Omaha, Nebraska
Feb 6, 1989*		Cleveland State	W 92–82	14–7	Omaha Civic Auditorium; Omaha, Nebraska
Feb 11, 1989		at Tulsa	L 67–75	14–8 (8–2)	Tulsa Convention Center; Tulsa, Oklahoma
Feb 13, 1989		Wichita State	L 62–66	14–9 (8–3)	Omaha Civic Auditorium; Omaha, Nebraska
Feb 16, 1989		Southern Illinois	W 102–100 ^{OT}	15–9 (9–3)	Omaha Civic Auditorium; Omaha, Nebraska
Feb 18, 1989		Indiana State	W 91–80	16–9 (10–3)	Omaha Civic Auditorium (8,316); Omaha, Nebraska
Feb 21, 1989*		at Montana State	L 80–82	16–10	Worthington Arena (4,000); Bozeman, Montana
Feb 27, 1989		at Drake	W 69–60	17–10 (11–3)	Veterans Memorial Auditorium (6,170); Des Moines, Iowa
Missouri Valley Conference tournament
Mar 5, 1989*		vs. Indiana State; MVC Tournament Quarterfinal	W 85–70	18–10	Levitt Arena; Wichita, Kansas
Mar 6, 1989*		vs. Drake; MVC Tournament Semifinal	W 54–49	19–10	Levitt Arena; Wichita, Kansas
Mar 7, 1989*		vs. Southern Illinois; MVC tournament championship	W 79–77	20–10	Levitt Arena (7,514); Wichita, Kansas
1989 NCAA tournament
Mar 17, 1989*	(14 MW)	vs. (3 MW) No. 6 Missouri; First Round	L 69–85	20–11	Reunion Arena; Dallas, Texas
*Non-conference game. ^{#}Rankings from AP. (#) Tournament seedings in parentheses. MW=Midwest. All times are in Central.
