= 1988–89 Marquette Warriors men's basketball team =

American college basketball season

1988–89 Marquette Warriors men's basketball
- Conference: Independent
- Record: 13–15
- Head coach: Bob Dukiet (3rd season)
- Home arena: Bradley Center

1988–89 NCAA Division I men's basketball independents standings
	Conf.				Overall
Team	W		L	PCT	W		L	PCT
Akron		–		–	21	–	8	.724
Notre Dame		–		–	21	–	9	.700
DePaul		–		–	21	–	12	.636
Miami (FL)		–		–	19	–	12	.613
UMBC		–		–	17	–	11	.607
Wright State		–		–	17	–	11	.607
Marquette		–		–	13	–	15	.464
Mount St. Mary's		–		–	12	–	15	.444
Chicago State		–		–	12	–	16	.429
Nicholls State		–		–	12	–	16	.429
Northern Illinois		–		–	11	–	17	.393
U.S. International		–		–	11	–	17	.393
Liberty		–		–	10	–	17	.370
Central Connecticut State		–		–	10	–	18	.357
Florida International		–		–	10	–	18	.357
Southern Utah		–		–	10	–	18	.357
UMKC		–		–	9	–	18	.333
Oral Roberts		–		–	8	–	20	.286
Central Florida		–		–	7	–	20	.259
Davidson		–		–	7	–	24	.226
Youngstown State		–		–	5	–	23	.179
Brooklyn		–		–	4	–	23	.148
Southeastern Louisiana		–		–	3	–	24	.111
Rankings from AP Poll

The 1988–89 Marquette Warriors men's basketball team represented Marquette University during the 1988–89 men's college basketball season. The Warriors finished the regular season with a record of 10–18. This was also their first season playing at the Bradley Center.

Guard Trevor Powell was the team's leading scorer with 423 points and 175 assists in 28 games. Other statistical leaders included Guard Tony Smith with 158 assists.

Following the season Bob Dukiet was hired at Gannon University.

== Roster ==
1988–89 Marquette Warriors men's basketball team
Players	Coaches
Pos. / # / Name / Height / Weight / Year / Hometown; G / 34 / Tony Smith / 6 ft 3 in (1.91 m) / 185 lb (84 kg) / Jr / Wauwatosa, Wisconsin	Head coach: Bob Dukiet; Assistant coach(es) Legend: (C) Team captain; (S) Suspended; (I) Ineligible; (W) Walk-on; Injured; Current redshirt; Roster

== Schedule ==
Date time, TV	Rank^{#}	Opponent^{#}	Result	Record	Site city, state
November 25		vs. Kent State	W 68–64	1–0	University Hall; Charlottesville, VA
November 26		at Virginia	L 63–80	1–1	University Hall (6,380); Charlottesville, VA
December 2		Rice	W 76–60	2–1	Bradley Center; Milwaukee, WI
December 3		Wisconsin	L 55–70	2–2	Bradley Center; Milwaukee, WI
December 5		Austin Peay	L 72–82	2–3	Bradley Center; Milwaukee, WI
December 8		St. Thomas (FL)	W 82–56	3–3	Bradley Center; Milwaukee, WI
December 12		at Wisconsin	L 50–61	3–4	Wisconsin Field House; Madison, WI
December 17		Minnesota	L 67–83	3–5	Bradley Center; Milwaukee, WI
December 19		at Creighton	L 73–79	3–6	Omaha Civic Auditorium; Omaha, NE
December 21		Morgan State	W 66–60	4–6	Bradley Center; Milwaukee, WI
January 2		Furman	W 78–56	5–6	Bradley Center; Milwaukee, WI
January 7		at Virginia Tech	W 93–90	6–6	Cassell Coliseum; Blacksburg, VA
January 9		Western Michigan	L 63–68	6–7	Bradley Center; Milwaukee, WI
January 14		Dayton	W 90–86	7–7	Bradley Center; Milwaukee, WI
January 17		DePaul	W 72–64	8–7	Bradley Center (12,543); Milwaukee, WI
January 28		at Miami (FL)	L 90–106	8–8	Miami Arena; Miami, FL
February 2		at Notre Dame	L 68–83	8–9	Joyce Center; Notre Dame, IN
February 4		at Wake Forest	L 67–70	8–10	Winston-Salem War Memorial Coliseum; Winston-Salem, NC
February 8		Toledo	W 84–65	9–10	Bradley Center; Milwaukee, WI
February 11		Oregon State	L 73–76	9–11	Bradley Center; Milwaukee, WI
February 15		Valparaiso	W 91–83	10–11	Bradley Center; Milwaukee, WI
February 20		Fordham	W 69–68	11–11	Bradley Center; Milwaukee, WI
February 23		Maryland-Baltimore County	W 88–75	12–11	Bradley Center; Milwaukee, WI
February 25		at Xavier	L 77–102	12–12	Cincinnati Gardens; Cincinnati, OH
February 28		Loyola (IL)	L 83–91	12–13	Bradley Center; Milwaukee, WI
March 2		at Dayton	W 76–74	13–13	UD Arena; Dayton, OH
March 4		at DePaul	L 79–91	13–14	Rosemont Horizon (13,629); Rosemont, IL
March 8		Notre Dame	L 63–67	13–15	Bradley Center; Milwaukee, WI
*Non-conference game. ^{#}Rankings from AP Poll. (#) Tournament seedings in parentheses.
