= 1988–89 UMKC Kangaroos men's basketball team =

American college basketball season

1988–89 UMKC Kangaroos men's basketball
- Conference: Independent
- Record: 9–18
- Head coach: Lee Hunt (2nd season)
- Home arena: Municipal Auditorium

1988–89 NCAA Division I men's basketball independents standings
	Conf.				Overall
Team	W		L	PCT	W		L	PCT
Akron		–		–	21	–	8	.724
Notre Dame		–		–	21	–	9	.700
DePaul		–		–	21	–	12	.636
Miami (FL)		–		–	19	–	12	.613
UMBC		–		–	17	–	11	.607
Wright State		–		–	17	–	11	.607
Marquette		–		–	13	–	15	.464
Mount St. Mary's		–		–	12	–	15	.444
Chicago State		–		–	12	–	16	.429
Nicholls State		–		–	12	–	16	.429
Northern Illinois		–		–	11	–	17	.393
U.S. International		–		–	11	–	17	.393
Liberty		–		–	10	–	17	.370
Central Connecticut State		–		–	10	–	18	.357
Florida International		–		–	10	–	18	.357
Southern Utah		–		–	10	–	18	.357
UMKC		–		–	9	–	18	.333
Oral Roberts		–		–	8	–	20	.286
Central Florida		–		–	7	–	20	.259
Davidson		–		–	7	–	24	.226
Youngstown State		–		–	5	–	23	.179
Brooklyn		–		–	4	–	23	.148
Southeastern Louisiana		–		–	3	–	24	.111
Rankings from AP Poll

The 1988–89 UMKC Kangaroos men's basketball team represented the University of Missouri–Kansas City during the 1988–89 NCAA Division I men's basketball season. The Kangaroos played their home games off-campus at Municipal Auditorium in Kansas City, Missouri as an independent (non-member of a conference) transitioning to full National Collegiate Athletic Association (NCAA) Division I status.

== Previous season ==
The Kangaroos finished the 1987–88 season competing for the initial time within the National Collegiate Athletic Association (NCAA); they ended with a record of 9–18 and no postseason involvement.

== Roster ==
1988–89 UMKC Kangaroos men's basketball team
Players
Coaches

Pos.	#	Name	Height	Weight	Year	Previous school	Hometown
F	30	Jay Boster (redshirt)	6 ft 5 in (1.96 m)	185 lb (84 kg)	Sr	Independence (KS) CC; Bennington HS	Bennington, KS
C	52	Ron Davis	6 ft 9 in (2.06 m)	208 lb (94 kg)	Sr	Seward County CC; All Saints HS	Queens, NY
G	24	Devon Francis	6 ft 3 in (1.91 m)	175 lb (79 kg)	Sr	Alvin CC; James Madison HS	Houston, TX
G	25	Frank Molak (redshirt)	6 ft 1 in (1.85 m)	180 lb (82 kg)	Sr	Iowa Lakes CC; Kuemper Catholic HS	Arcadia, IA
F	21	Billy Newbill	6 ft 8 in (2.03 m)	200 lb (91 kg)	Sr	McLennan CC; Smith-Cotton HS	Sedalia, MO
F	44	Mark Oliver	6 ft 6 in (1.98 m)	220 lb (100 kg)	Sr	Southwestern (IA) CC; Lindblom Technical HS	Chicago, IL
F	42	Napoleon Petteway	6 ft 8 in (2.03 m)	205 lb (93 kg)	Sr	Ellsworth CC; Flint Northern HS	Flint, MI
F	22	Baxter Russell	6 ft 5 in (1.96 m)	204 lb (93 kg)	Sr	McLennan CC; Crockett HS	Austin, TX
G	12	Reggie DeGrate	6 ft 1 in (1.85 m)	—	Jr
F	55	Baron McLaughlin	6 ft 6 in (1.98 m)	210 lb (95 kg)	Jr	Parkland; Lane Tech College Prep HS	Chicago, IL
G	32	Anthony Crompton	6 ft 4 in (1.93 m)	180 lb (82 kg)	So	Lincoln College Preparatory Academy	Kansas City, MO
C	45	David Robinson	6 ft 10 in (2.08 m)	230 lb (104 kg)	So	Joplin HS	Joplin, MO
G	11	Kent Denmon	6 ft 3 in (1.91 m)	—	Fr	Hickman Mills HS	Kansas City, MO

Head coach

- Lee Hunt (Central Missouri State)

Assistant coach(es)

Legend

- (C) Team captain
- (S) Suspended
- (I) Ineligible
- (W) Walk-on
- (5Y) Fifth-year Senior
- Injured
- Current redshirt

== Schedule & Results ==
Date time, TV	Rank^{#}	Opponent^{#}	Result	Record	High points	High rebounds	High assists	Site (attendance) city, state
Regular Season
November 26, 1988*; 7:05 PM		Denver	W 75–58	1–0	19 – DeGrate	12 – Russell	10 – DeGrate	Municipal Auditorium (1,855); Kansas City, MO
December 3, 1988*; 7:05 PM		at Saint Louis	L 51–67	1–1	12 – Davis	8 – Petteway	8 – Russell	Kiel Auditorium (4,511); St. Louis, MO
December 5, 1988*; 7:05 PM		Tennessee Tech	L 55–58	1–2	13 – Russell	7 – Davis	6 – DeGrate	Municipal Auditorium (2,317); Kansas City, MO
December 10, 1988*; 7:05 PM		at Tulsa	L 49–61	1–3	13 – Russell	13 – Davis	4 – Russell	Tulsa Convention Center (4,976); Tulsa, OK
December 17, 1988*; 7:05 PM		Kansas State	L 57–83	1–4	11 – Francis, Robinson	8 – Robinson	4 – Francis, Russell	Municipal Auditorium (9,516); Kansas City, MO
December 19, 1988*; 7:05 PM		at Oklahoma State	L 78–109	1–5	17 – Davis	9 – Petteway, Robinson	5 – Denmon	Gallagher-Iba Arena (2,538); Stillwater, OK
December 21, 1988*; 7:05 PM		Morehead State	W 67–65	2–5	16 – Davis	6 – Robinson	5 – Denmon	Municipal Auditorium (1,248); Kansas City, MO
December 28, 1988*; 6:05 PM		at Cincinnati	W 63–58	3–5	11 – Davis, Francis, DeGrate	9 – Robinson	6 – Russell	Riverfront Coliseum (2,149); Cincinnati, OH
December 30, 1988*; 7:05 PM		Texas Southern	W 77–76	4–5	21 – Davis	10 – Davis	5 – Francis, Russell	Municipal Auditorium (2,318); Kansas City, MO
January 4, 1989*; 7:05 PM		Grambling State	W 80–65	5–5	15 – DeGrate	10 – Davis	6 – Russell	Municipal Auditorium (2,708); Kansas City, MO
January 7, 1989*; 7:05 PM		Cleveland State	L 61–87	5–6	12 – Russell	15 – Davis	6 – Russell	Municipal Auditorium (3,569); Kansas City, MO
January 9, 1989*; 7:05 PM		Texas–Pan American	L 54–56	5–7	13 – Davis	7 – Russell	5 – DeGrate	Municipal Auditorium (2,318); Kansas City, MO
January 11, 1989*; 7:05 PM		Arkansas State	L 58–80	5–8	16 – Robinson	11 – Robinson	2 – DeGrate	Municipal Auditorium (2,329); Kansas City, MO
January 16, 1989*; 7:05 PM		at Tennessee State	W 69–59	6–8	13 – Davis, Francis, Russell	13 – Russell	5 – Francis	Gentry Center (1,003); Nashville, TN
January 23, 1989*; 7:05 PM		Samford	W 77–51	7–8	16 – Russell	8 – DeGrate	8 – DeGrate	Municipal Auditorium (1,589); Kansas City, MO
January 28, 1989*; 7:05 PM		at Northern Illinois	L 78–90	7–9	25 – Petteway, Robinson	8 – Robinson	8 – Russell	Chick Evans Field House (1,146); DeKalb, IL
January 30, 1989*; 7:05 PM		at Arkansas State	L 50–69	7–10	14 – Davis	6 – Russell	2 – Petteway, Russell, DeGrate	Convocation Center (5,370); Jonesboro, AR
February 4, 1989*; 7:05 PM		Chicago State	L 63–71	7–11	15 – Petteway	11 – Robinson	7 – Russell, Denmon	Municipal Auditorium (2,016); Kansas City, MO
February 6, 1989*; 7:05 PM		Wisconsin–Milwaukee	L 67–72	7–12	13 – DeGrate	13 – Davis	6 – Petteway	Municipal Auditorium (1,928); Kansas City, MO
February 8, 1989*; 7:05 PM		at Grambling State	L 71–79	7–13	22 – Petteway	6 – Davis, Petteway	4 – Denmon	Memorial Gymnasium (976); Grambling, LA
February 13, 1989*; 9:05 PM		at United States International	L 96–102 ^{OT}	7–14	35 – Petteway	12 – Petteway	5 – DeGrate	Golden Hall (182); San Diego, CA
February 18, 1989*; 7:05 PM		at South Alabama	L 72–91	7–15	24 – Davis	17 – Davis	4 – Russell	Jaguar Gym (3,375); Mobile, AL
February 22, 1989*; 7:05 PM		at Texas–Pan American	W 73–58	7–16	21 – Russell	15 – Davis	6 – Francis, Russell	UTPA Fieldhouse (1,639); Edinburg, TX
February 25, 1989*; 6:05 PM		at American	L 75–80	7–17	20 – Petteway, Crompton	10 – Robinson	4 – Russell, Denmon	Bender Arena (2,023); Washington, D. C.
March 1, 1989*; 7:05 PM		Alcorn State	W 92–68	8–17	35 – Petteway	9 – Davis	12 – Russell	Municipal Auditorium (2,215); Kansas City, MO
March 4, 1989*; 6:05 PM		at Youngstown State	W 77–74	9–17	26 – Russell	10 – Russell	20 – Denmon	Beeghly Physical Education Center (2,000); Youngstown, OH
March 6, 1989*; 6:05 PM		at Cleveland State	L 61–99	9–18	22 – Petteway	11 – Davis	5 – Francis	Woodling Gymnasium (2,873); Cleveland, OH
*Non-conference game. ^{#}Rankings from AP Poll. (#) Tournament seedings in parentheses. All times are in Central Standard Time (CST).
