= 1988–89 Florida State Seminoles men's basketball team =

American college basketball season

1988–89 Florida State Seminoles men's basketball

Metro Conference Regular Season Champions

NCAA tournament, First round
- Conference: Metro Conference (1975–1995)

Ranking
- Coaches: No. 16
- AP: No. 16
- Record: 22–8 (9–3 Metro)
- Head coach: Pat Kennedy (3rd season)
- Assistant coaches: David Zimroth; Rich Petriccione; Tom Carlson
- Home arena: Tallahassee-Leon County Civic Center

1988–89 Metro Conference men's basketball standings
	Conf.				Overall
Team	W		L	PCT	W		L	PCT
No. 16 Florida State	9	–	3	.750	22	–	8	.733
No. 12 Louisville †	8	–	4	.667	24	–	9	.727
Memphis State	8	–	4	.667	21	–	11	.656
South Carolina	8	–	4	.667	19	–	11	.633
Cincinnati	5	–	7	.417	15	–	12	.556
Virginia Tech	2	–	10	.167	11	–	17	.393
Southern Miss	2	–	10	.167	10	–	17	.370
† 1989 Metro Conference tournament winner Rankings from AP poll

The 1988–89 Florida State Seminoles men's basketball team represented Florida State University in the program's final season as members of the Metro Conference during the 1988–89 NCAA Division I men's basketball season. Led by head coach Pat Kennedy, the Seminoles reached the NCAA tournament as the #4 seed in the Southeast region, but were upset in the first round by Middle Tennessee State. The team finished with an overall record of 22–8 (9–3 Metro).

== Roster ==
1988–89 Florida State Seminoles men's basketball team
Players
Coaches

Pos.	#	Name	Height	Weight	Year	Previous school	Hometown
G	5	Lorenzo Hands	6 ft 3 in (1.91 m)	195 lb (88 kg)	Fr	Twin Lakes	West Palm Beach, Florida
G	11	Derrick Mitchell	6 ft 3 in (1.91 m)	190 lb (86 kg)	Sr	Raines	Jacksonville, Florida
G	12	Joey Barnes	6 ft 2 in (1.88 m)	160 lb (73 kg)	So	Shanks	Quincy, Florida
G	14	Brad Johnson	6 ft 6 in (1.98 m)	195 lb (88 kg)	So	Owen	Black Mountain, North Carolina
G/F	15	Blake Miles	6 ft 6 in (1.98 m)	195 lb (88 kg)	Fr	Maclay	Tallahassee, Florida
F	20	Aubry Boyd	6 ft 6 in (1.98 m)	175 lb (79 kg)	So	Southwest	Macon, Georgia
G	21	George McCloud	6 ft 6 in (1.98 m)	205 lb (93 kg)	Sr	Mainland	Daytona Beach, Florida
G	22	Tharon Mayes	6 ft 3 in (1.91 m)	170 lb (77 kg)	Jr	Hillhouse	New Haven, Connecticut
F	24	Tony Dawson	6 ft 7 in (2.01 m)	205 lb (93 kg)	Sr	Gulf Coast CC	Kinston, North Carolina
F	30	Irving Thomas	6 ft 8 in (2.03 m)	215 lb (98 kg)	Jr	Miami Carol City
F	31	David White	6 ft 6 in (1.98 m)	225 lb (102 kg)	So	Boca Ciega	St. Petersburg, Florida
G/F	33	Byron Wells	6 ft 8 in (2.03 m)	200 lb (91 kg)	Fr	King	Tampa, Florida
C	34	William Hunter	6 ft 7 in (2.01 m)	220 lb (100 kg)	Sr	Tate	Cantonment, Florida
F	45	Michael Polite	6 ft 7 in (2.01 m)	215 lb (98 kg)	So	Mainland	Daytona Beach, Florida

Head coach

- Pat Kennedy (King's College)

Assistant coach(es)

- Rich Petriccione
- David Zimroth
- Tom Carlson

Legend

- (C) Team captain
- (S) Suspended
- (I) Ineligible
- (W) Walk-on
- Injured
- Current redshirt

== Schedule ==
Date time, TV	Rank^{#}	Opponent^{#}	Result	Record	Site city, state
Regular Season
Nov 25, 1988*	No. 17	Central Florida	W 133–79	1–0	Tallahassee-Leon County Civic Center; Tallahassee, Florida
Nov 29, 1988*	No. 14	Florida International	W 100–75	2–0	Tallahassee-Leon County Civic Center; Tallahassee, Florida
Dec 3, 1988*	No. 14	No. 19 Florida; Rivalry	W 114–86	3–0	Tallahassee-Leon County Civic Center; Tallahassee, Florida
Dec 9, 1988*	No. 14	Stetson	W 91–74	4–0	Tallahassee-Leon County Civic Center; Tallahassee, Florida
Dec 14, 1988*	No. 12	South Alabama	W 87–82	5–0	Tallahassee-Leon County Civic Center; Tallahassee, Florida
Dec 17, 1988*	No. 12	at Penn State	W 78–71	6–0	Rec Hall; University Park, Pennsylvania
Dec 20, 1988*	No. 11	South Florida	W 113–81	7–0	Tallahassee-Leon County Civic Center; Tallahassee, Florida
Dec 28, 1988*	No. 10	vs. Central Florida; Red Lobster Classic	W 97–64	8–0	Orlando, Florida
Dec 29, 1988*	No. 10	vs. Villanova; Red Lobster Classic	L 67–68	8–1	Orlando, Florida
Jan 4, 1989*	No. 15	Rider	W 113–67	9–1	Tallahassee-Leon County Civic Center; Tallahassee, Florida
Jan 7, 1989	No. 15	Southern Miss	W 104–79	10–1 (1–0)	Tallahassee-Leon County Civic Center; Tallahassee, Florida
Jan 11, 1989*	No. 14	at Jacksonville	W 85–70	11–1	Jacksonville Memorial Coliseum; Jacksonville, Florida
Jan 15, 1989*	No. 14	No. 17 Tennessee	W 101–90	12–1	Tallahassee-Leon County Civic Center; Tallahassee, Florida
Jan 18, 1989*	No. 14	at Arkansas	W 112–105	13–1	Barnhill Arena; Fayetteville, Arkansas
Jan 21, 1989	No. 14	Cincinnati	W 95–80	14–1 (2–0)	Tallahassee-Leon County Civic Center; Tallahassee, Florida
Jan 26, 1989	No. 11	at South Carolina	W 69–67	15–1 (3–0)	Carolina Coliseum; Columbia, South Carolina
Jan 28, 1989	No. 11	at Virginia Tech	W 100–97	16–1 (4–0)	Cassell Coliseum; Blacksburg, Virginia
Feb 1, 1989	No. 8	Memphis State	L 82–99	16–2 (4–1)	Tallahassee-Leon County Civic Center; Tallahassee, Florida
Feb 4, 1989	No. 8	at Cincinnati	W 66–65	17–2 (5–1)	Cincinnati Gardens; Cincinnati, Ohio
Feb 6, 1989	No. 12	at No. 7 Louisville	W 81–78	18–2 (6–1)	Freedom Hall; Louisville, Kentucky
Feb 8, 1989	No. 12	South Carolina	W 88–72	19–2 (7–1)	Tallahassee-Leon County Civic Center; Tallahassee, Florida
Feb 16, 1989	No. 7	No. 10 Louisville	L 77–78	19–3 (7–2)	Tallahassee-Leon County Civic Center; Tallahassee, Florida
Feb 18, 1989	No. 7	at Memphis State	L 79–89	19–4 (7–3)	Mid-South Coliseum; Memphis, Tennessee
Feb 21, 1989*	No. 12	at New Orleans	L 77–83	19–5	Lakefront Arena; New Orleans, Louisiana
Feb 23, 1989*	No. 12	at La Salle	L 100–101	19–6	Palestra; Philadelphia, Pennsylvania
Mar 1, 1989	No. 16	Virginia Tech	W 117–97	20–6 (8–3)	Tallahassee-Leon County Civic Center; Tallahassee, Florida
Mar 4, 1989	No. 16	at Southern Miss	W 81–78	21–6 (9–3)	Reed Green Coliseum; Hattiesburg, Mississippi
Metro Conference Tournament
Mar 10, 1989*	No. 14	at South Carolina; Metro Conference Tournament Semifinal	W 80–63	22–6	Carolina Coliseum; Columbia, South Carolina
Mar 11, 1989*	No. 14	vs. No. 16 Louisville; Metro Conference Tournament Semifinal	L 80–87	22–7	Carolina Coliseum; Columbia, South Carolina
NCAA Tournament
Mar 16, 1989*	(4 SE) No. 16	vs. (13 SE) Middle Tennessee State; First Round	L 83–97	22–8	Memorial Gymnasium; Nashville, Tennessee
*Non-conference game. ^{#}Rankings from AP Poll. (#) Tournament seedings in parentheses. SE=Southeast. All times are in Eastern.

== NBA draft ==
Round	Pick	Player	NBA club
1	7	George McCloud	Indiana Pacers
