= 1988–89 Missouri Tigers men's basketball team =

American college basketball season

1988–89 Missouri Tigers men's basketball

Big Eight tournament champions

NCAA tournament, Sweet Sixteen
- Conference: Big Eight Conference

Ranking
- Coaches: No. 8
- AP: No. 6
- Record: 29–8 (10–4 Big 8)
- Head coach: Norm Stewart (22nd season)
- Assistant coaches: Bob Sundvold; Rich Daly; Sam Moore
- Captains: Mike Sandbothe; Greg Church
- Home arena: Hearnes Center

1988–89 Big Eight Conference men's basketball standings
	Conf.				Overall
Team	W		L	PCT	W		L	PCT
No. 4 Oklahoma	12	–	2	.857	30	–	6	.833
No. 6 Missouri †	10	–	4	.714	29	–	8	.784
Kansas State	8	–	6	.571	19	–	11	.633
Oklahoma State	7	–	7	.500	17	–	13	.567
Iowa State	7	–	7	.500	17	–	12	.586
Kansas	6	–	8	.429	19	–	12	.613
Nebraska	4	–	10	.286	17	–	16	.515
Colorado	2	–	12	.143	7	–	21	.250
† 1989 Big Eight tournament winner As of March 3, 2012; Rankings from AP poll

The 1988–89 Missouri Tigers men's basketball team represented the University of Missouri as a member of the Big Eight Conference during the 1988–89 NCAA men's basketball season. Led by head coach Norm Stewart, the Tigers finished second in the Big Eight regular season standings, won the Big Eight conference tournament, and were the No. 3 seed in the Midwest region of the NCAA tournament. The Tigers advanced to the Sweet Sixteen and finished with an overall record of 29–8 (10–4 Big Eight).

== Roster ==
1988–89 Missouri Tigers men's basketball team
Players
Coaches

Pos.	#	Name	Height	Weight	Year	Hometown
G	4	Lee Coward	6 ft 1 in (1.85 m)	—	Jr	Detroit, MI
G	21	Byron Irvin	6 ft 5 in (1.96 m)	190 lb (86 kg)	Sr	Chicago, Illinois
F	33	Greg Church	6 ft 8 in (2.03 m)	221 lb (100 kg)	Sr
F	34	Doug Smith	6 ft 10 in (2.08 m)	215 lb (98 kg)	So	Detroit, Michigan
F	42	Mike Sandbothe	6 ft 8 in (2.03 m)	—	Sr
G	44	Anthony Peeler	6 ft 4 in (1.93 m)	205 lb (93 kg)	Fr	Kansas City, Missouri
C	52	Gary Leonard	7 ft 1 in (2.16 m)	264 lb (120 kg)	Sr	Belleville, Illinois

Head coach

- Norm Stewart (Missouri)

Assistant coach(es)

- Bob Sundvold
- Rich Daly
- Sam Moore

Legend

- (C) Team captain
- (S) Suspended
- (I) Ineligible
- (W) Walk-on
- Injured
- Current redshirt

== Schedule and results ==
Date time, TV	Rank^{#}	Opponent^{#}	Result	Record	Site (attendance) city, state
Regular season
Nov 18, 1988*; ESPN	No. 14	SW Missouri State; Preseason NIT	W 73–54	1–0	Hearnes Center; Columbia, Missouri
Nov 19, 1988*; ESPN	No. 14	Xavier; Preseason NIT	W 83–71	2–0	Hearnes Center; Columbia, Missouri
Nov 20, 1988*; ESPN	No. 14	vs. No. 6 North Carolina; Preseason NIT	W 91–81	3–0	Madison Square Garden; New York, New York
Nov 21, 1988*; ESPN	No. 14	vs. No. 8 Syracuse; Preseason NIT Championship	L 84–86 ^{OT}	3–1	Madison Square Garden; New York, New York
Nov 28, 1988*	No. 13	Tennessee-Martin	W 97–55	4–1	Hearnes Center; Columbia, Missouri
Dec 2, 1988*	No. 8	vs. No. 17 Temple; Diet Pepsi Tournament of Champions	W 91–74	5–1	Charlotte Coliseum; Charlotte, North Carolina
Dec 3, 1988*	No. 8	vs. No. 10 North Carolina; Diet Pepsi Tournament of Champions	L 60–76	5–2	Charlotte Coliseum; Charlotte, North Carolina
Dec 7, 1988*	No. 11	at Tulsa	W 73–61	6–2	Tulsa Convention Center; Tulsa, Oklahoma
Dec 10, 1988*	No. 11	Memphis State	W 86–74	7–2	Hearnes Center; Columbia, Missouri
Dec 16, 1988*	No. 10	Eastern Washington	W 81–68	8–2	Hearnes Center; Columbia, Missouri
Dec 17, 1988*	No. 10	Ohio	W 113–85	9–2	Hearnes Center; Columbia, Missouri
Dec 19, 1988*	No. 10	vs. No. 6 Illinois; Braggin' Rights	L 84–87	9–3	St. Louis Arena (18,561); St. Louis, Missouri
Dec 21, 1988*	No. 10	Southern	W 114–96	10–3	Hearnes Center; Columbia, Missouri
Dec 29, 1988*	No. 11	Arkansas	W 83–78	11–3	Hearnes Center; Columbia, Missouri
Jan 3, 1989*	No. 11	Morgan State	W 96–66	12–3	Hearnes Center; Columbia, Missouri
Jan 7, 1989	No. 11	at Colorado	W 84–75	13–3 (1–0)	CU Events/Conference Center; Boulder, Colorado
Jan 14, 1989	No. 10	Iowa State	W 96–71	14–3 (2–0)	Hearnes Center; Columbia, Missouri
Jan 16, 1989*	No. 10	at Virginia Tech	W 104–99	15–3	Cassell Coliseum; Blacksburg, Virginia
Jan 21, 1989	No. 8	Oklahoma State	W 105–83	16–3 (3–0)	Hearnes Center; Columbia, Missouri
Jan 24, 1989*	No. 5	at Maryland	W 87–73	17–3	Cole Fieldhouse; College Park, Maryland
Jan 28, 1989	No. 5	at Nebraska	W 89–72	18–3 (4–0)	Bob Devaney Sports Center; Lincoln, Nebraska
Feb 1, 1989; ESPN	No. 5	at Kansas	W 91–66	19–3 (5–0)	Allen Fieldhouse; Lawrence, Kansas
Feb 4, 1989	No. 5	Kansas State	W 73–68	20–3 (6–0)	Hearnes Center; Columbia, Missouri
Feb 9, 1989; ESPN	No. 3	at No. 5 Oklahoma	L 105–112	20–4 (6–1)	Lloyd Noble Center (11,734); Norman, Oklahoma
Feb 11, 1989; NBC	No. 3	Kansas	W 93–80	21–4 (7–1)	Hearnes Center; Columbia, Missouri
Feb 14, 1989	No. 3	at Iowa State	L 75–82	21–5 (7–2)	Hilton Coliseum; Ames, Iowa
Feb 19, 1989	No. 3	Nebraska	W 79–63	22–5 (8–2)	Hearnes Center; Columbia, Missouri
Feb 22, 1989	No. 7	at Oklahoma State	L 71–82	22–6 (8–3)	Gallagher-Iba Arena; Stillwater, Oklahoma
Feb 25, 1989	No. 7	No. 1 Oklahoma	W 97–84	23–6 (9–3)	Hearnes Center; Columbia, Missouri
Mar 1, 1989	No. 7	at Kansas State	L 75–76	23–7 (9–4)	Bramlage Coliseum; Manhattan, Kansas
Mar 4, 1989	No. 7	Colorado	W 66–65	24–7 (10–4)	Hearnes Center; Columbia, Missouri
Big Eight Conference tournament
Mar 10, 1989*	No. 10	vs. Nebraska; Big Eight tournament quarterfinal	W 98–70	25–7	Kemper Arena; Kansas City, Missouri
Mar 11, 1989*	No. 10	vs. Kansas State; Big Eight tournament semifinal	W 88–83	26–7	Kemper Arena; Kansas City, Missouri
Mar 12, 1989*; ABC	No. 10	vs. No. 2 Oklahoma; Big Eight tournament championship	W 98–86	27–7	Kemper Arena; Kansas City, Missouri
NCAA tournament
Mar 17, 1989*; CBS	(3 MW) No. 6	vs. (14 MW) Creighton; First round	W 85–69	28–7	Reunion Arena; Dallas, Texas
Mar 19, 1989*; CBS	(3 MW) No. 6	vs. (11 MW) Texas; Second Round	W 108–89	29–7	Reunion Arena; Dallas, Texas
Mar 24, 1989*; CBS	(3 MW) No. 6	vs. (2 MW) No. 7 Syracuse; Midwest Regional semifinal	L 80–83	29–8	Hubert H. Humphrey Metrodome; Minneapolis, Minnesota
*Non-conference game. ^{#}Rankings from AP Poll. (#) Tournament seedings in parentheses. MW=Midwest. All times are in Central.

== Rankings ==
Ranking movements Legend: ██ Increase in ranking ██ Decrease in ranking — = Not ranked
	Week																	
Poll	Pre	1	2	3	4	5	6	7	8	9	10	11	12	13	14	15	16	Final
AP	14	13	8	11	10	10	11	11	10	8	5	5	3	3	7	7	10	6
Coaches	13	—	11	11	10	10	11	13	12	8	8	6	3	3	7	7	10	8

^Coaches did not release a Week 1 poll.
