= Tony Barone =

American basketball coach and scout (1946–2019)

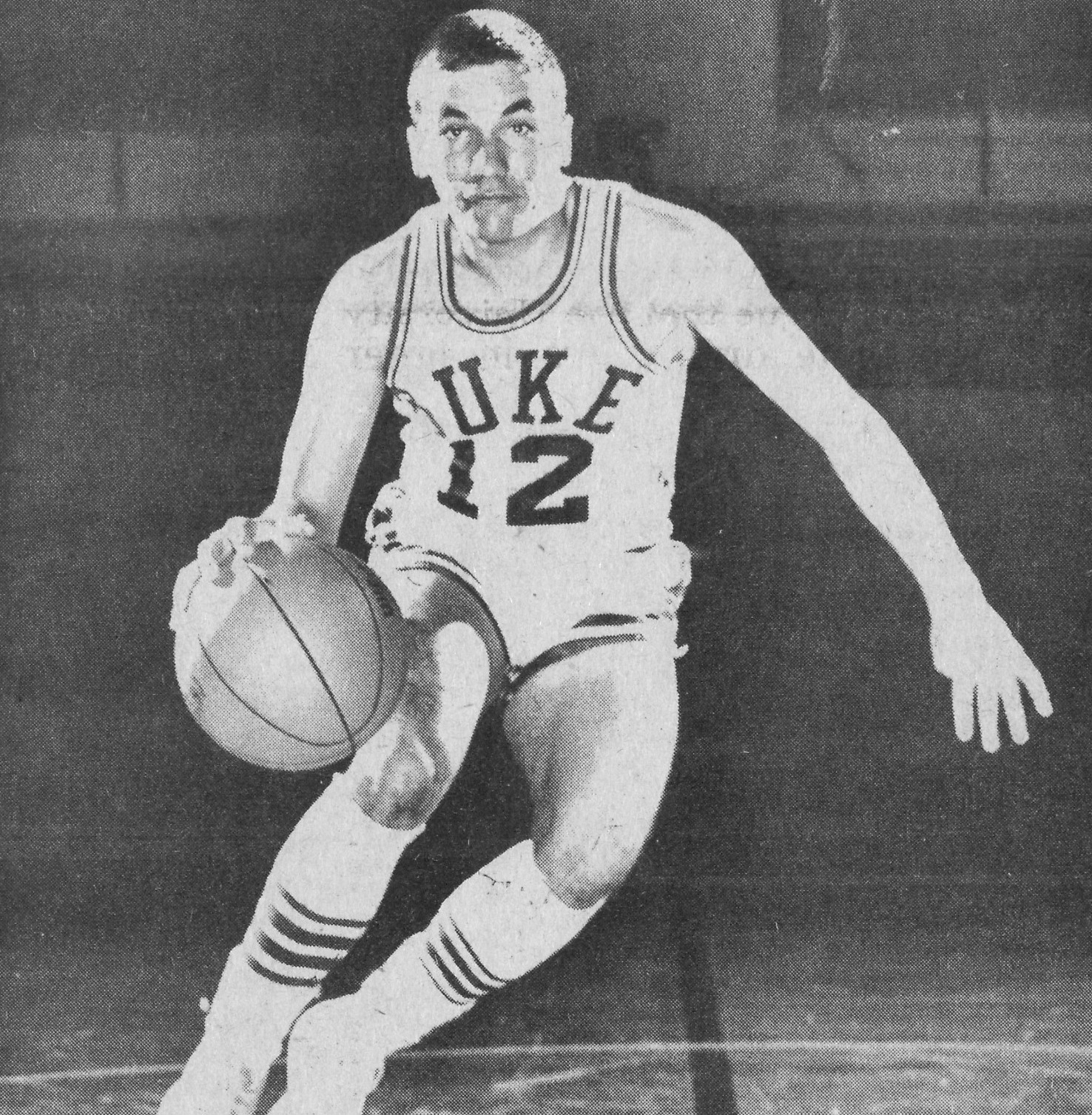
- Barone with the Duke Blue Devils in 1967

Personal information
- Born: July 20, 1946 Chicago, Illinois, U.S.
- Died: June 25, 2019 (aged 72)
- Listed height: 5 ft 9 in (1.75 m)

Career information
- High school: St. George (Evanston, Illinois)
- College: Duke (1965–1968)
- Position: Guard
- Coaching career: 1972–2007

Career history

Coaching
- 1972–1974: Duke (assistant)
- 1978–1985: Bradley (assistant)
- 1985–1991: Creighton
- 1991–1998: Texas A&M
- 2002–2004: Memphis Grizzlies (assistant)
- 2006–2007: Memphis Grizzlies

Career highlights
- 2× MVC regular season champion (1989, 1991); 2× MVC tournament champion (1989, 1991); MVC Coach of the Year (1989)

Anthony Andrew Barone Sr. (July 20, 1946 – June 25, 2019) was an American basketball coach and scout. A native of Chicago, he was head coach of the Memphis Grizzlies of the National Basketball Association (NBA). Barone was appointed as the team's interim coach by Grizzlies general manager Jerry West after West fired Mike Fratello on December 28, 2006. Prior to landing his first head coaching job after Fratello's dismissal, Barone had served as an assistant coach for five seasons. Barone was also the Grizzlies' director of player personnel.

Barone was an Academic All-American while playing at Duke, where he graduated with a degree in English in 1971. He was previously the head coach at Creighton from 1985 to 1991. During his time at Creighton, Barone compiled a 102–82 record and led Creighton to two NCAA Division I men's basketball tournament appearances. Barone was pursued by major Division I programs and took the head coach position at Texas A&M, where he led the team from 1991 to 1998. During his Texas A&M tenure, Barone compiled a record of 76–120 while having only one winning season. Barone was fired as head coach at Texas A&M following the 1997–98 season. He was a member of the Chicagoland Sports Hall of Fame.

Barone died on June 25, 2019, at the age of 72. His son Brian played for his father at Texas A&M, transferring to Marquette after Tony's dismissal; Brian would later follow in Tony's footsteps as a Division I coach, currently at SIU Edwardsville.

== Head coaching record ==
=== NBA ===
Legend
Regular season	G	Games coached	W	Games won	L	Games lost	W–L %	Win–loss %
Playoffs	PG	Playoff games	PW	Playoff wins	PL	Playoff losses	PW–L %	Playoff win–loss %

Team	Year	G	W	L	W–L%	Finish	PG	PW	PL	PW–L%	Result
Memphis	2006–07	52	16	36	.308	5th in Southwest	—	—	—	—	Missed playoffs
Career		52	16	36	.308		—	—	—	—	

=== College ===
Record table
Season	Team	Overall	Conference	Standing	Postseason
Creighton Bluejays (Missouri Valley Conference) (1985–1991)
1985–86	Creighton	12–16	7–9	T–5th	
1986–87	Creighton	9–19	4–10	T–7th	
1987–88	Creighton	16–16	6–8	T–4th	
1988–89	Creighton	20–11	11–3	1st	NCAA Division I First Round
1989–90	Creighton	21–12	9–5	T–2nd	NIT First Round
1990–91	Creighton	24–8	12–4	1st	NCAA Division I Second Round
Creighton:		102–82 (.554)	49–39 (.557)		
Texas A&M Aggies (Southwest Conference) (1991–1996)
1991–92	Texas A&M	6–22	2–12	8th	
1992–93	Texas A&M	10–17	5–9	6th	
1993–94	Texas A&M	19–11	10–4	T–2nd	NIT First Round
1994–95	Texas A&M	14–16	7–7	5th	
1995–96	Texas A&M	11–16	3–11	T–7th	
Texas A&M Aggies (Big 12 Conference) (1996–1998)
1996–97	Texas A&M	9–18	3–13	T–11th	
1997–98	Texas A&M	7–20	1–15	12th	
Texas A&M:		76–120 (.388)	31–71 (.304)		
Total:		178–202 (.468)			
National champion Postseason invitational champion Conference regular season champion Conference regular season and conference tournament champion Division regular season champion Division regular season and conference tournament champion Conference tournament champion
