= 1989 Metro Conference men's basketball tournament =

Basketball tournament in Columbia, South Carolina, USA

- Classification: Division I
- Season: 1988–89
- Teams: 5
- Site: Carolina Coliseum; Columbia, SC
- Champions: Louisville (7th title)
- Winning coach: Denny Crum (7th title)
- MVP: Pervis Ellison (2nd) (Louisville)

1988–89 Metro Conference men's basketball standings
	Conf.				Overall
Team	W		L	PCT	W		L	PCT
No. 16 Florida State	9	–	3	.750	22	–	8	.733
No. 12 Louisville †	8	–	4	.667	24	–	9	.727
Memphis State	8	–	4	.667	21	–	11	.656
South Carolina	8	–	4	.667	19	–	11	.633
Cincinnati	5	–	7	.417	15	–	12	.556
Virginia Tech	2	–	10	.167	11	–	17	.393
Southern Miss	2	–	10	.167	10	–	17	.370
† 1989 Metro Conference tournament winner Rankings from AP poll

The 1989 Metro Conference men's basketball tournament was held March 9–11 at the Carolina Coliseum in Columbia, South Carolina.

Louisville defeated Florida State in the championship game, 87–80, to win their seventh Metro men's basketball tournament.

The Cardinals received the conference's automatic bid to the 1989 NCAA Tournament. In addition, Florida State, Memphis State, and South Carolina received at-large bids.

== Format ==
Five of the conference's seven members participated, with Cincinnati and Virginia Tech left out. Teams were seeded based on regular season conference records, with the top three teams (Florida State, Louisville, Memphis State) earning a bye into the semifinal round. The other two teams – South Carolina and Southern Miss – entered into the quarterfinal round.

== Bracket ==
Quarterfinal; Thursday, March 9
4	South Carolina	63
5	Southern Miss	62

Semifinals; Friday, March 10
1	Florida State	80
4	South Carolina	63
3	Memphis State	70
2	Louisville	71

Championship; Saturday, March 11
1	Florida State	80
2	Louisville	87
