= 1988–89 Kansas State Wildcats men's basketball team =

American college basketball season

1988–89 Kansas State Wildcats men's basketball

NCAA tournament, First Round
- Conference: Big Eight Conference
- Record: 19–11 (8–6 Big Eight)
- Head coach: Lon Kruger (3rd season)
- Assistant coaches: Dana Altman (3rd season); Greg Grensing
- Home arena: Bramlage Coliseum

1988–89 Big Eight Conference men's basketball standings
	Conf.				Overall
Team	W		L	PCT	W		L	PCT
No. 4 Oklahoma	12	–	2	.857	30	–	6	.833
No. 6 Missouri †	10	–	4	.714	29	–	8	.784
Kansas State	8	–	6	.571	19	–	11	.633
Oklahoma State	7	–	7	.500	17	–	13	.567
Iowa State	7	–	7	.500	17	–	12	.586
Kansas	6	–	8	.429	19	–	12	.613
Nebraska	4	–	10	.286	17	–	16	.515
Colorado	2	–	12	.143	7	–	21	.250
† 1989 Big Eight tournament winner As of March 3, 2012; Rankings from AP poll

The 1988–89 Kansas State Wildcats men's basketball team represented Kansas State University as a member of the Big 8 Conference during the 1988–89 NCAA Division I men's basketball season. The head coach was Lon Kruger who was in his third of four years at the helm of his alma mater. The Wildcats finished with a record of 19–11 (8–6 Big 8), and received an at-large bid to the NCAA tournament as No. 6 seed in the East region. Kansas State lost to Minnesota in the opening round of the tournament.

The team played its home games at Bramlage Coliseum in Manhattan, Kansas. It was the first season the team played in the new arena after leaving Ahearn Field House after the 1987–88 season. Kansas State defeated Purdue, 81–77, in the first game played at Bramlage Coliseum.

== Roster ==
1988–89 Kansas State Wildcats men's basketball team
Players	Coaches
Pos. / # / Name / Height / Weight / Year / Hometown; G / 12 / Steve Henson / 5 ft 11 in (1.8 m) / 170 lb (77 kg) / Jr / McPherson, Kansas	Head coach: Lon Kruger (Kansas State); Assistant coach(es) Legend: (C) Team captain; (S) Suspended; (I) Ineligible; (W) Walk-on; Injured; Current redshirt; Roster

== Schedule and results ==
Date time, TV	Rank^{#}	Opponent^{#}	Result	Record	Site city, state
Regular Season
Nov 26, 1988*		Purdue	W 81–77	1–0	Bramlage Coliseum; Manhattan, Kansas
Nov 30, 1988*		Utah State	W 86–67	2–0	Bramlage Coliseum; Manhattan, Kansas
Dec 3, 1988*		at Oregon State	L 48–66	2–1	Gill Coliseum; Corvallis, Oregon
Dec 7, 1988*		Baylor	W 84–60	3–1	Bramlage Coliseum; Manhattan, Kansas
Dec 10, 1988*		Vanderbilt	W 71–62	4–1	Bramlage Coliseum; Manhattan, Kansas
Dec 17, 1988*		at Missouri-Kansas City	W 83–57	5–1	Municipal Auditorium; Kansas City, Missouri
Dec 19, 1988*		at Akron	W 70–68	6–1	James A. Rhodes Arena; Akron, Ohio
Dec 22, 1988*		Missouri-St. Louis	W 67–61	7–1	Bramlage Coliseum; Manhattan, Kansas
Jan 3, 1989*		at SW Missouri State	L 55–58	7–2	Hammons Student Center; Springfield, Missouri
Jan 5, 1989*		Texas-Arlington	W 83–52	8–2	Bramlage Coliseum; Manhattan, Kansas
Jan 7, 1989*		at Minnesota	L 67–72	8–3	Williams Arena; Minneapolis, Minnesota
Jan 14, 1989		No. 16 Kansas; Sunflower Showdown	L 74–75 ^{OT}	8–4 (0–1)	Bramlage Coliseum; Manhattan, Kansas
Jan 16, 1989*		Southern Utah	W 84–75	9–4	Bramlage Coliseum; Manhattan, Kansas
Jan 18, 1989		Colorado	W 98–84	10–4 (1–1)	Bramlage Coliseum; Manhattan, Kansas
Jan 21, 1989		at Nebraska	W 80–68	11–4 (2–1)	Bob Devaney Sports Center; Lincoln, Nebraska
Jan 25, 1989		at Oklahoma State	L 71–89	11–5 (2–2)	Gallagher-Iba Arena; Stillwater, Oklahoma
Jan 28, 1989		at No. 18 Kansas; Sunflower Showdown	W 71–70	12–5 (3–2)	Allen Fieldhouse; Lawrence, Kansas
Feb 1, 1989		No. 1 Oklahoma	L 82–90	12–6 (3–3)	Bramlage Coliseum; Manhattan, Kansas
Feb 4, 1989		at No. 5 Missouri	L 68–73	12–7 (3–4)	Hearnes Center; Columbia, Missouri
Feb 9, 1989		Iowa State	W 104–89	13–7 (4–4)	Bramlage Coliseum; Manhattan, Kansas
Feb 11, 1989		Nebraska	W 80–66	14–7 (5–4)	Bramlage Coliseum; Manhattan, Kansas
Feb 15, 1989		at Colorado	W 87–79	15–7 (6–4)	CU Events/Conference Center; Boulder, Colorado
Feb 19, 1989*		at Wichita State	W 73–71 ^{OT}	16–7	Levitt Arena; Wichita, Kansas
Feb 22, 1989		at No. 1 Oklahoma	L 82–86	16–8 (6–5)	Lloyd Noble Center; Norman, Oklahoma
Feb 25, 1989		Oklahoma State	W 69–62	17–8 (7–5)	Bramlage Coliseum; Manhattan, Kansas
Mar 1, 1989		No. 7 Missouri	W 76–75	18–8 (8–5)	Bramlage Coliseum; Manhattan, Kansas
Mar 4, 1989		at Iowa State	L 89–101	18–9 (8–6)	Hilton Coliseum; Ames, Iowa
Big 8 Tournament
Mar 10, 1989*		vs. Kansas; Big 8 Tournament Quarterfinal	W 73–65	19–9	Kemper Arena; Kansas City, Missouri
Mar 11, 1989*		vs. No. 10 Missouri; Big 8 Tournament Semifinal	L 83–88	19–10	Kemper Arena; Kansas City, Missouri
NCAA Tournament
Mar 16, 1989*	(6 E)	vs. (11 E) Minnesota; First Round	L 75–86	19–11	Greensboro Coliseum; Greensboro, North Carolina
*Non-conference game. ^{#}Rankings from AP Poll. (#) Tournament seedings in parentheses. E=East.
