= 1988 Maui Invitational =

1988 Maui Invitational Tournament
- Season: 1987–98
- Teams: 8
- Finals site: Lahaina Civic Center; Maui, Hawaii
- Champions: Michigan (2nd title)
- Runner-up: Oklahoma (1st title game)
- Semifinalists: UNLV; Memphis State
- Winning coach: Bill Frieder (2nd title)
- MVP: Glen Rice (Michigan)

The 1988 Maui Invitational Tournament was an early-season college basketball tournament that was played, for the 5th time, from November 25 to November 27, 1988. The tournament, which began in 1984, was part of the 1988-89 NCAA Division I men's basketball season. The tournament featured a particularly loaded field (three of the eight teams were ranked in the AP top 10 and a fourth in the top 20) and the eventual national champion for the second straight season. Games were played at the Lahaina Civic Center in Maui, Hawaii. The No. 3 Michigan Wolverines won the tournament by defeating Vanderbilt, Memphis State, and No. 4 Oklahoma. It was the second title for the program and its head coach Bill Frieder.

== Bracket ==
5th Place Game; Sunday, November 27
Vanderbilt	82
16	Ohio State	97
7th Place Game
Chaminade	68
DePaul	89

Consolation 2nd Round; Saturday, November 26
Chaminade	70
Vanderbilt	94
16	Ohio State	72
DePaul	70

First Round; Friday, November 25
Chaminade	44
Memphis State	88
Vanderbilt	66
3	Michigan	91
16	Ohio State	93
4	Oklahoma	97
DePaul	77
8	UNLV	86

Semifinals; Saturday, November 26
Memphis State	75
3	Michigan	79
4	Oklahoma	83
8	UNLV	81

Championship; Sunday, November 27
3	Michigan	91
4	Oklahoma	80
3rd Place Game
Memphis State	86
8	UNLV	90
