= 1988–89 NCAA Division I men's basketball season =

Basketball season

- Preseason AP No. 1: Duke Blue Devils
- NCAA Tournament: 1989
- Tournament dates: March 16 – April 3, 1989
- National Championship: Kingdome; Seattle, Washington
- NCAA Champions: Michigan Wolverines
- Other champions: St. John's Redmen (NIT)
- Player of the Year (Naismith, Wooden): Danny Ferry, Duke Blue Devils (Naismith); Sean Elliott, Arizona Wildcats (Wooden)

The 1988–89 NCAA Division I men's basketball season began in November 1988 and ended with the Final Four at the Kingdome in Seattle, Washington, on April 3, 1989.

== Season headlines ==
- The ECAC Metro renamed itself the North Atlantic Conference. It renamed itself the America East Conference in 1996.
- The ECAC North renamed itself the Northeast Conference.
- The Pacific Coast Athletic Association changed its name to the Big West Conference on July 1, 1988.
- Loyola Marymount junior All-American Hank Gathers became the second player in NCAA Division I history to lead the nation in scoring (32.7) and rebounding (13.7) in the same season.
- Neutral courts were used in all rounds of the NCAA tournament for the first time.
- All the No. 1 and No. 2 seeds in the NCAA tournament advanced to the "Sweet Sixteen" for the first time.
- The NCAA notes that P. J. Carlesimo of Seton Hall became the first head coach with a beard to advance to the NCAA tournament's Final Four.
- Steve Fisher of Michigan became the first head coach to win the NCAA title in his first year as a head coach.

== Major rule changes ==
Beginning in 1988–89, the following rules changes were implemented:

- Any player who participates in a fight is ejected from the game and placed on probation. If he participates in a second fight during the season, he is suspended for one game. If he participates in a third fight during the season, he is suspended for the rest of the season, including championship competition.

== Season outlook ==
=== Pre-season polls ===
The top 20 from the AP Poll and Coaches Poll during the pre-season.

Associated Press
Ranking	Team
1	Duke
2	Georgetown
3	Michigan
4	Louisville
5	Oklahoma
6	North Carolina
7	Iowa
8	Syracuse
9	Illinois
10	UNLV
11	Arizona
12	Villanova
13	Georgia Tech
14	Missouri
15	Florida
16	Florida State
17	Ohio State
18	NC State
19	Temple
20	Stanford

UPI Coaches
Ranking	Team
1	Duke
2	Michigan
3	North Carolina
4	Georgetown
5	Illinois
6	Oklahoma
7	UNLV
8	Syracuse
9	Iowa
10	Louisville
11	Arizona
12	Villanova
13	Missouri
14	Florida
15	Temple
16	Georgia Tech
17	Indiana
18	Florida State
19	Stanford
20	NC State
20	Purdue

== Conference membership changes ==
School	Former conference	New conference
Davidson Wildcats	Southern Conference	NCAA Division I independent
Dayton Flyers	NCAA Division I independent	Midwestern Collegiate Conference
Liberty Flames	Mason–Dixon Conference (D-II)	NCAA Division I independent
Mount St. Mary's Mountaineers	Mason–Dixon Conference (D-II)	NCAA Division I independent
Southern Utah Thunderbirds	NCAA Division II independent	NCAA Division I independent
Youngstown State Penguins	Ohio Valley Conference	NCAA Division I independent

== Regular season ==
=== Conferences ===
==== Conference winners and tournaments ====
Conference	Regular season first place	Conference player of the year	Conference Coach of the Year	Conference tournament	Tournament venue (city)	Tournament winner
American South Conference	New Orleans	Randy White, Louisiana Tech	Al Barbre, Lamar & Tim Floyd, New Orleans	1989 American South Conference men's basketball tournament	Cajundome (Lafayette, LA)	Louisiana Tech
Association of Mid-Continent Universities	SW Missouri State	Jay Taylor, Eastern Illinois	Charlie Spoonhour, SW Missouri State	1989 AMCU-8 men's basketball tournament	Hammons Student Center (Springfield, MO)	SW Missouri State
Atlantic 10 Conference	West Virginia	Mark Macon, Temple	Bob Wenzel, Rutgers	1989 Atlantic 10 men's basketball tournament	Rutgers Athletic Center; Piscataway, New Jersey	Rutgers
Atlantic Coast Conference	NC State	Danny Ferry, Duke	Jim Valvano, NC State	1989 ACC men's basketball tournament	Omni Coliseum; Atlanta, Georgia	North Carolina
Big East Conference	Georgetown	Charles Smith, Georgetown	P. J. Carlesimo, Seton Hall	1989 Big East men's basketball tournament	Madison Square Garden; New York, New York	Georgetown
Big Eight Conference	Oklahoma	Stacey King, Oklahoma	Billy Tubbs, Oklahoma	1989 Big Eight Conference men's basketball tournament	Kemper Arena; Kansas City, Missouri	Missouri
Big Sky Conference	Boise State & Idaho	Chris Childs, Idaho	Kermit Davis Jr., Idaho	1989 Big Sky Conference men's basketball tournament	BSU Pavilion; Boise, Idaho	Idaho
Big South Conference	Coastal Carolina	Henry Wilson, Campbell	Russ Bergman, Coastal Carolina	1989 Big South Conference men's basketball tournament	Winthrop Coliseum; Rock Hill, South Carolina	UNC Asheville
Big Ten Conference	Indiana	Jay Edwards, Indiana; Glen Rice, Michigan	Bob Knight, Indiana	No Tournament		
Big West Conference	UNLV	Stacey Augmon, UNLV	Neil McCarthy, New Mexico State	1989 Big West Conference men's basketball tournament	Long Beach Arena; Long Beach, California	UNLV
Colonial Athletic Association	Richmond	Blue Edwards, East Carolina	Dick Tarrant, Richmond	1989 CAA men's basketball tournament	Hampton Coliseum; Hampton, Virginia	George Mason
East Coast Conference	Bucknell	Kurk Lee, Towson State		1989 East Coast Conference men's basketball tournament	Towson Center; Towson, Maryland	Bucknell
Ivy League	Princeton	Bob Scrabis, Princeton	Not named	No Tournament		
Metro Conference	Florida State	George McCloud, Florida State	Larry Finch, Memphis State	1989 Metro Conference men's basketball tournament	Carolina Coliseum; Columbia, South Carolina	Louisville
Metro Atlantic Athletic Conference	La Salle	Lionel Simmons, La Salle	Ted Fiore, Saint Peter's, & Speedy Morris, La Salle	1989 MAAC men's basketball tournament	Meadowlands Arena; East Rutherford, New Jersey	La Salle
Mid-American Conference	Ball State	Paul Graham, Ohio	Rick Majerus, Ball State	1989 MAC men's basketball tournament	John F. Savage Hall; Toledo, Ohio	Ball State
Mid-Eastern Athletic Conference	South Carolina State	Tom Davis, Delaware State	Cy McClairen, Bethune-Cookman	1989 MEAC men's basketball tournament	Greensboro Coliseum; Greensboro, North Carolina	South Carolina State
Midwestern Collegiate Conference	Evansville	Scott Haffner, Evansville	Jim Crews, Evansville	1989 Midwestern Collegiate Conference men's basketball tournament	UD Arena; Dayton, Ohio	Xavier
Missouri Valley Conference	Creighton	Anthony Manuel, Bradley	Tony Barone, Creighton	1989 Missouri Valley Conference men's basketball tournament	Levitt Arena; Wichita, Kansas	Creighton
North Atlantic Conference	Siena	Jeff Robinson, Siena	Mike Deane, Siena	1989 North Atlantic Conference men's basketball tournament	Hartford Civic Center; Hartford, Connecticut	Siena
Northeast Conference	Robert Morris	Vaughn Luton, Robert Morris	Jarrett Durham, Robert Morris	1989 Northeast Conference men's basketball tournament	Charles L. Sewall Center; Moon Township, Pennsylvania	Robert Morris
Ohio Valley Conference	Middle Tennessee & Murray State	Jeff Martin, Murray State	Bruce Stewart, Middle Tennessee	1989 Ohio Valley Conference men's basketball tournament	Nashville Municipal Auditorium; Nashville, Tennessee	Middle Tennessee
Pacific-10 Conference	Arizona	Sean Elliott, Arizona	Lute Olson, Arizona, & Ralph Miller, Oregon State	1989 Pacific-10 Conference men's basketball tournament	Great Western Forum; Inglewood, California	Arizona
Southeastern Conference	Florida	Chris Jackson, LSU	Wimp Sanderson, Alabama	1989 SEC men's basketball tournament	Thompson–Boling Arena; Knoxville, Tennessee	Alabama
Southern Conference	Chattanooga	John Taft, Marshall	Randy Nesbit, The Citadel	1989 Southern Conference men's basketball tournament	Asheville Civic Center; Asheville, North Carolina	East Tennessee State
Southland Conference	North Texas State	Deon Hunter, North Texas State	Jimmy Gales, North Texas State	1989 Southland Conference men's basketball tournament	Super Pit; Denton, Texas	McNeese State
Southwest Conference	Arkansas	Travis Mays, Texas	Nolan Richardson, Arkansas	1989 Southwest Conference men's basketball tournament	Reunion Arena; Dallas, Texas	Arkansas
Southwestern Athletic Conference	Grambling State, Southern, & Texas Southern	Terry Brooks, Alabama State		1989 SWAC men's basketball tournament	F. G. Clark Center; Baton Rouge, Louisiana	Southern
Sun Belt Conference	South Alabama	Jeff Hodge, South Alabama	Ronnie Arrow, South Alabama	1989 Sun Belt Conference men's basketball tournament	Charlotte Coliseum; Charlotte, North Carolina	South Alabama
Trans America Athletic Conference	Georgia Southern	Jeff Sanders, Georgia Southern	Mike Newell, Arkansas–Little Rock	1989 TAAC men's basketball tournament	Barton Coliseum; Little Rock, Arkansas	Arkansas–Little Rock
West Coast Athletic Conference	Saint Mary's	Hank Gathers, Loyola Marymount	Lynn Nance, Saint Mary's	1989 West Coast Athletic Conference men's basketball tournament	War Memorial Gymnasium (San Francisco, CA)	Loyola Marymount
Western Athletic Conference	Colorado State	Tim Hardaway, UTEP	Riley Wallace, Hawaii	1989 WAC men's basketball tournament	Jon M. Huntsman Center (Salt Lake City, UT)	UTEP

==== Conference standings ====
1988–89 American South Conference men's basketball standings
	Conf.				Overall
Team	W		L	PCT	W		L	PCT
New Orleans	7	–	3	.700	19	–	11	.633
Louisiana Tech †	6	–	4	.600	23	–	9	.719
Arkansas State	6	–	4	.600	20	–	10	.667
Southwestern Louisiana	4	–	6	.400	17	–	12	.586
Pan American	4	–	6	.400	15	–	13	.536
Lamar	3	–	7	.300	12	–	16	.429
† 1989 American South tournament winner Rankings from AP Poll

1988–89 AMCU-8 Conference men's basketball standings
	Conf.				Overall
Team	W		L	PCT	W		L	PCT
Southwest Missouri State †	10	–	2	.833	21	–	10	.677
Northern Iowa	8	–	4	.667	19	–	9	.679
Eastern Illinois	7	–	5	.583	16	–	16	.500
Wisconsin–Green Bay	6	–	6	.500	14	–	14	.500
Valparaiso	4	–	8	.333	10	–	19	.345
Western Illinois	4	–	8	.333	9	–	19	.321
Illinois–Chicago	3	–	9	.250	13	–	17	.433
Cleveland State	0	–	0	–	16	–	12	.571
† 1989 AMCU-8 tournament winner

1988–89 Atlantic 10 men's basketball standings
	Conf.				Overall
Team	W		L	PCT	W		L	PCT
No. 17 West Virginia	17	–	1	.944	26	–	5	.839
Temple	15	–	3	.833	18	–	12	.600
Rutgers †	13	–	5	.722	18	–	13	.581
Penn State	12	–	6	.667	20	–	12	.625
Rhode Island	9	–	9	.500	13	–	15	.464
St. Bonaventure	7	–	11	.389	13	–	15	.464
Duquesne	7	–	11	.389	13	–	16	.448
UMass	5	–	13	.278	10	–	18	.357
Saint Joseph's	4	–	14	.222	8	–	21	.276
George Washington	1	–	17	.056	1	–	27	.036
† 1989 Atlantic 10 Tournament winner Rankings from AP Poll

1988–89 ACC men's basketball standings
	Conf.				Overall
Team	W		L	PCT	W		L	PCT
No. 19 NC State	10	–	4	.714	22	–	9	.710
No. 9 Duke	9	–	5	.643	28	–	8	.778
Virginia	9	–	5	.643	22	–	11	.667
No. 5 North Carolina †	9	–	5	.643	29	–	8	.784
Georgia Tech	8	–	6	.571	20	–	12	.625
Clemson	7	–	7	.500	19	–	11	.633
Wake Forest	3	–	11	.214	13	–	15	.464
Maryland	1	–	13	.071	9	–	20	.310
† 1989 ACC tournament winner Rankings from AP Poll

1988–89 Big East men's basketball standings
	Conf.				Overall
Team	W		L	PCT	W		L	PCT
No. 2 Georgetown †	13	–	3	.813	29	–	5	.853
No. 11 Seton Hall	11	–	5	.688	31	–	7	.816
No. 7 Syracuse	10	–	6	.625	30	–	8	.789
Pittsburgh	9	–	7	.563	17	–	13	.567
Villanova	7	–	9	.438	18	–	16	.529
Providence	7	–	9	.438	18	–	11	.621
Connecticut	6	–	10	.375	18	–	13	.581
St. John's	6	–	10	.375	20	–	13	.606
Boston College	3	–	13	.188	12	–	17	.414
† 1989 Big East tournament winner As of April 3, 1989; Rankings from AP poll

1988–89 Big Eight Conference men's basketball standings
	Conf.				Overall
Team	W		L	PCT	W		L	PCT
No. 4 Oklahoma	12	–	2	.857	30	–	6	.833
No. 6 Missouri †	10	–	4	.714	29	–	8	.784
Kansas State	8	–	6	.571	19	–	11	.633
Oklahoma State	7	–	7	.500	17	–	13	.567
Iowa State	7	–	7	.500	17	–	12	.586
Kansas	6	–	8	.429	19	–	12	.613
Nebraska	4	–	10	.286	17	–	16	.515
Colorado	2	–	12	.143	7	–	21	.250
† 1989 Big Eight tournament winner As of March 3, 2012; Rankings from AP poll

1988–89 Big Sky men's basketball standings
	Conf.				Overall
Team	W		L	PCT	W		L	PCT
Boise State	13	–	3	.813	23	–	7	.767
Idaho †	13	–	3	.813	25	–	6	.806
Montana	11	–	5	.688	20	–	11	.645
Nevada	10	–	6	.625	16	–	12	.571
Weber State	9	–	7	.563	17	–	11	.607
Montana State	6	–	10	.375	15	–	16	.484
Eastern Washington	5	–	11	.313	8	–	22	.267
Idaho State	4	–	12	.250	9	–	18	.333
Northern Arizona	1	–	15	.063	2	–	25	.074
† Conference tournament winner

1988–89 Big South Conference men's basketball standings
	Conf.				Overall
Team	W		L	PCT	W		L	PCT
Coastal Carolina	9	–	3	.750	14	–	14	.500
Campbell	8	–	4	.667	18	–	12	.600
Baptist	6	–	6	.500	12	–	16	.429
UNC Asheville †	6	–	6	.500	16	–	14	.533
Radford	5	–	7	.417	15	–	13	.536
Winthrop	5	–	7	.417	16	–	13	.552
Augusta State	3	–	9	.250	5	–	23	.179
† 1989 Big South tournament winner Rankings from AP Poll

1988–89 Big Ten Conference men's basketball standings
	Conf.				Overall
Team	W		L	PCT	W		L	PCT
No. 8 Indiana	15	–	3	.833	27	–	8	.771
No. 3 Illinois	14	–	4	.778	31	–	5	.861
No. 10 Michigan	12	–	6	.667	30	–	7	.811
No. 14 Iowa	10	–	8	.556	23	–	10	.697
Minnesota	9	–	9	.500	19	–	12	.613
Wisconsin	8	–	10	.444	18	–	12	.600
Purdue	8	–	10	.444	15	–	16	.484
Ohio State	6	–	12	.333	19	–	15	.559
Michigan State	6	–	12	.333	18	–	15	.545
Northwestern	2	–	16	.111	9	–	19	.321
Rankings from AP Poll

1988–89 Big West men's basketball standings
	Conf.				Overall
Team	W		L	PCT	W		L	PCT
No. 15 UNLV †	16	–	2	.889	29	–	8	.784
New Mexico State	12	–	6	.667	21	–	11	.656
UC Santa Barbara	11	–	7	.611	21	–	9	.700
Cal State Fullerton	10	–	8	.556	16	–	13	.552
Long Beach State	10	–	8	.556	13	–	15	.464
Utah State	10	–	8	.556	12	–	16	.429
Fresno State	9	–	9	.500	15	–	14	.517
UC Irvine	8	–	10	.444	12	–	17	.414
Pacific	3	–	15	.167	7	–	21	.250
San Jose State	1	–	17	.056	5	–	23	.179
† 1989 Big West tournament winner Rankings from AP poll

1988–89 CAA men's basketball standings
	Conf.				Overall
Team	W		L	PCT	W		L	PCT
Richmond	13	–	1	.929	21	–	10	.677
George Mason †	10	–	4	.714	20	–	11	.645
American	9	–	5	.643	17	–	11	.607
UNC Wilmington	9	–	5	.643	16	–	14	.533
James Madison	6	–	8	.429	16	–	14	.533
East Carolina	6	–	8	.429	15	–	14	.517
William & Mary	2	–	12	.143	5	–	23	.179
Navy	1	–	13	.071	6	–	22	.214
† 1989 CAA tournament winner Rankings from AP Poll

1988–89 East Coast Conference men's basketball standings
	Conf.				Overall
Team	W		L	PCT	W		L	PCT
Bucknell †	11	–	3	.786	23	–	8	.742
Towson State	10	–	4	.714	19	–	10	.655
Lafayette	8	–	6	.571	20	–	10	.667
Hofstra	7	–	7	.500	14	–	15	.483
Drexel	7	–	7	.500	12	–	16	.429
Delaware	6	–	8	.429	14	–	14	.500
Lehigh	5	–	9	.357	10	–	18	.357
Rider	2	–	12	.143	5	–	23	.179
† 1989 ECC tournament winner Rankings from AP poll

1988–89 Ivy League men's basketball standings
	Conf.				Overall
Team	W		L	PCT	W		L	PCT
Princeton	11	–	3	.786	19	–	8	.704
Dartmouth	10	–	4	.714	17	–	9	.654
Penn	9	–	5	.643	13	–	13	.500
Harvard	7	–	7	.500	11	–	15	.423
Cornell	7	–	7	.500	10	–	16	.385
Yale	6	–	8	.429	11	–	17	.393
Columbia	4	–	10	.286	8	–	18	.308
Brown	2	–	12	.143	7	–	19	.269
Rankings from AP Poll

1988–89 MAAC men's basketball standings
	Conf.				Overall
Team	W		L	PCT	W		L	PCT
La Salle †	13	–	1	.929	26	–	6	.813
Saint Peter's	11	–	3	.786	22	–	9	.710
Iona	8	–	6	.571	15	–	16	.484
Fordham	8	–	6	.571	14	–	15	.483
Army	6	–	8	.429	12	–	16	.429
Holy Cross	5	–	9	.357	13	–	15	.464
Manhattan	3	–	11	.214	7	–	21	.250
Fairfield	2	–	12	.143	7	–	21	.250
† 1989 MAAC tournament winner

1988–89 Metro Conference men's basketball standings
	Conf.				Overall
Team	W		L	PCT	W		L	PCT
No. 16 Florida State	9	–	3	.750	22	–	8	.733
No. 12 Louisville †	8	–	4	.667	24	–	9	.727
Memphis State	8	–	4	.667	21	–	11	.656
South Carolina	8	–	4	.667	19	–	11	.633
Cincinnati	5	–	7	.417	15	–	12	.556
Virginia Tech	2	–	10	.167	11	–	17	.393
Southern Miss	2	–	10	.167	10	–	17	.370
† 1989 Metro Conference tournament winner Rankings from AP poll

1988–89 Mid-American Conference men's basketball standings
	Conf.				Overall
Team	W		L	PCT	W		L	PCT
No. 18 Ball State †	14	–	2	.875	29	–	3	.906
Kent State	12	–	4	.750	21	–	10	.677
Toledo	11	–	5	.688	18	–	13	.581
Eastern Michigan	8	–	8	.500	17	–	12	.586
Central Michigan	7	–	9	.438	13	–	15	.464
Bowling Green	7	–	9	.438	13	–	15	.464
Western Michigan	6	–	10	.375	12	–	16	.429
Ohio	6	–	10	.375	13	–	16	.448
Miami (OH)	1	–	15	.063	5	–	23	.179
† 1989 MAC tournament winner Rankings from AP poll

1988–89 MEAC men's basketball standings
	Conf.				Overall
Team	W		L	PCT	W		L	PCT
South Carolina State †	14	–	2	.875	25	–	8	.758
Florida A&M	12	–	4	.750	20	–	10	.667
Coppin State	11	–	5	.688	18	–	11	.621
Morgan State	9	–	7	.563	16	–	13	.552
Bethune–Cookman	8	–	8	.500	12	–	16	.429
Delaware State	6	–	10	.375	11	–	17	.393
North Carolina A&T	6	–	10	.375	9	–	18	.333
Howard	5	–	11	.313	9	–	19	.321
Maryland Eastern Shore	1	–	15	.063	1	–	26	.037
† 1989 MEAC tournament winner Rankings from AP Poll

1988–89 Midwestern Collegiate Conference men's basketball standings
	Conf.				Overall
Team	W		L	PCT	W		L	PCT
Evansville	10	–	2	.833	25	–	6	.806
Saint Louis	8	–	4	.667	27	–	10	.730
Xavier †	7	–	5	.583	21	–	12	.636
Dayton	6	–	6	.500	12	–	17	.414
Detroit Mercy	4	–	8	.333	7	–	21	.250
Loyola (IL)	4	–	8	.333	11	–	17	.393
Butler	3	–	9	.250	11	–	17	.393
† 1989 MCC tournament winner Rankings from AP Poll

1988–89 Missouri Valley Conference men's basketball standings
	Conf.				Overall
Team	W		L	PCT	W		L	PCT
Creighton †	11	–	3	.786	20	–	11	.645
Wichita State	10	–	4	.714	19	–	11	.633
Tulsa	10	–	4	.714	18	–	13	.581
Bradley	7	–	7	.500	13	–	14	.481
Drake	6	–	8	.429	12	–	17	.414
Southern Illinois	6	–	8	.429	20	–	14	.588
Illinois State	6	–	8	.429	13	–	17	.433
Indiana State	0	–	14	.000	4	–	24	.143
† 1989 MVC tournament winner Rankings from AP Poll

1988–89 North Atlantic Conference men's basketball standings
	Conf.				Overall
Team	W		L	PCT	W		L	PCT
Siena †	16	–	1	.941	25	–	5	.833
Boston University	14	–	4	.778	21	–	9	.700
Northeastern	12	–	5	.706	17	–	11	.607
Canisius	11	–	7	.611	13	–	15	.464
Hartford	10	–	7	.588	15	–	13	.536
Maine	7	–	11	.389	9	–	19	.321
Niagara	6	–	12	.333	9	–	19	.321
Colgate	5	–	13	.278	6	–	22	.214
Vermont	4	–	14	.222	6	–	21	.222
New Hampshire	3	–	14	.176	4	–	22	.154
† 1989 NAC tournament winner

1988–89 Northeast Conference men's basketball standings
	Conf.				Overall
Team	W		L	PCT	W		L	PCT
Robert Morris†	12	–	4	.750	21	–	9	.700
Fairleigh Dickinson	11	–	5	.688	17	–	12	.586
Marist*	9	–	7	.563	13	–	15	.464
Monmouth	9	–	7	.563	15	–	13	.536
Long Island	7	–	9	.438	9	–	19	.321
Loyola (MD)	7	–	9	.438	10	–	18	.357
Saint Francis (PA)	6	–	10	.375	13	–	16	.448
Wagner	6	–	10	.375	11	–	16	.407
St. Francis (NY)	5	–	11	.313	11	–	16	.407
† 1989 NEC tournament winner Rankings from AP Poll *Ineligible for conference tournament

1988–89 Ohio Valley Conference men's basketball standings
	Conf.				Overall
Team	W		L	PCT	W		L	PCT
Middle Tennessee †	10	–	2	.833	23	–	8	.742
Murray State	10	–	2	.833	19	–	11	.633
Austin Peay	8	–	4	.667	18	–	12	.600
Morehead State	5	–	7	.417	15	–	16	.484
Eastern Kentucky	4	–	8	.333	7	–	22	.241
Tennessee Tech	3	–	9	.250	10	–	20	.333
Tennessee State	2	–	10	.167	4	–	24	.143
† 1989 OVC tournament winner Rankings from AP Poll

1988–89 Pacific-10 Conference men's basketball standings
	Conf.				Overall
Team	W		L	PCT	W		L	PCT
No. 1 Arizona †	17	–	1	.944	29	–	4	.879
No. 13 Stanford	15	–	3	.833	26	–	7	.788
UCLA	13	–	5	.722	21	–	10	.677
Oregon State	13	–	5	.722	22	–	8	.733
California	10	–	8	.556	20	–	13	.606
Washington	8	–	10	.444	12	–	16	.429
Arizona State	5	–	13	.278	12	–	16	.429
Washington State	4	–	14	.222	10	–	19	.345
Oregon	3	–	15	.167	8	–	21	.276
USC	2	–	16	.111	10	–	22	.313
† Conference tournament winner As of April 15, 1989; Rankings from AP poll

1988–89 Southeastern Conference men's basketball standings
	Conf.				Overall
Team	W		L	PCT	W		L	PCT
Florida	13	–	5	.722	21	–	13	.618
No. 20 Alabama †	12	–	6	.667	23	–	8	.742
Vanderbilt	12	–	6	.667	19	–	14	.576
LSU	11	–	7	.611	20	–	12	.625
Tennessee	11	–	7	.611	19	–	11	.633
Kentucky	8	–	10	.444	13	–	19	.406
Ole Miss	8	–	10	.444	15	–	15	.500
Mississippi State	7	–	11	.389	13	–	15	.464
Georgia	6	–	12	.333	15	–	16	.484
Auburn	2	–	16	.111	9	–	19	.321
† 1989 SEC tournament winner Rankings from AP poll

1988–89 Southern Conference men's basketball standings
	Conf.				Overall
Team	W		L	PCT	W		L	PCT
Chattanooga	10	–	4	.714	18	–	12	.600
Furman	9	–	5	.643	17	–	12	.586
Appalachian State	8	–	6	.571	20	–	8	.714
East Tennessee State †	7	–	7	.500	20	–	11	.645
The Citadel	7	–	7	.500	16	–	12	.571
Marshall	6	–	8	.429	15	–	15	.500
VMI	5	–	9	.357	11	–	17	.393
Western Carolina	4	–	10	.286	12	–	16	.429
† 1989 SoCon Tournament winner As of April 30, 1988; Rankings from AP poll

1988–89 Southland Conference men's basketball standings
	Conf.				Overall
Team	W		L	PCT	W		L	PCT
North Texas State	10	–	4	.714	14	–	15	.483
NE Louisiana	9	–	5	.643	17	–	12	.586
McNeese State †	9	–	5	.643	16	–	14	.533
Sam Houston State	8	–	6	.571	12	–	16	.429
Northwestern State	7	–	7	.500	13	–	16	.448
Southwest Texas State	6	–	8	.429	13	–	17	.433
UT Arlington	4	–	10	.286	7	–	21	.250
Stephen F. Austin	3	–	11	.214	10	–	18	.357
† 1989 Southland Conference tournament winner

1988–89 Southwest Conference men's basketball standings
	Conf.				Overall
Team	W		L	PCT	W		L	PCT
Arkansas †	13	–	3	.813	25	–	7	.781
Texas	12	–	4	.750	25	–	9	.735
TCU	9	–	7	.563	17	–	13	.567
Houston	8	–	8	.500	17	–	14	.548
Texas A&M	8	–	8	.500	16	–	14	.533
Texas Tech	8	–	8	.500	13	–	15	.464
SMU	7	–	9	.438	13	–	16	.448
Rice	6	–	10	.375	12	–	16	.429
Baylor	1	–	15	.063	5	–	22	.185
† 1989 SWC tournament winner Rankings from AP Poll

1988–89 SWAC men's basketball standings
	Conf.				Overall
Team	W		L	PCT	W		L	PCT
Southern †	10	–	4	.714	20	–	11	.645
Texas Southern	10	–	4	.714	17	–	13	.567
Grambling State	10	–	4	.714	15	–	14	.517
Jackson State	7	–	7	.500	15	–	13	.536
Alabama State	7	–	7	.500	13	–	16	.448
Prairie View A&M	5	–	9	.357	11	–	16	.407
Alcorn State	4	–	10	.286	5	–	23	.179
Mississippi Valley State	3	–	11	.214	8	–	20	.286
† 1989 SWAC tournament winner Rankings from AP Poll

1988–89 Sun Belt Conference men's basketball standings
	Conf.				Overall
Team	W		L	PCT	W		L	PCT
South Alabama †	11	–	3	.786	23	–	9	.719
UNC Charlotte	10	–	4	.714	17	–	12	.586
VCU	9	–	5	.643	13	–	15	.464
UAB	8	–	6	.571	22	–	12	.647
Old Dominion	7	–	7	.500	15	–	13	.536
Jacksonville	5	–	9	.357	14	–	16	.467
Western Kentucky	4	–	10	.286	14	–	15	.483
South Florida	2	–	12	.143	7	–	21	.250
† 1989 Sun Belt Conference tournament winner Rankings from AP Poll

1988–89 Trans America Athletic Conference men's basketball standings
	Conf.				Overall
Team	W		L	PCT	W		L	PCT
Georgia Southern	16	–	2	.889	23	–	6	.793
Arkansas–Little Rock †	14	–	4	.778	23	–	8	.742
Stetson	10	–	8	.556	17	–	12	.586
Centenary (LA)	9	–	9	.500	16	–	14	.533
Georgia State	9	–	9	.500	14	–	14	.500
Mercer	9	–	9	.500	14	–	14	.500
UTSA	8	–	10	.444	15	–	13	.536
Houston Baptist	6	–	12	.333	9	–	20	.310
Samford	5	–	13	.278	8	–	19	.296
Hardin-Simmons	4	–	14	.222	8	–	19	.296
† 1989 TAAC tournament winner Rankings from AP Poll

1988–89 West Coast Conference men's basketball standings
	Conf.				Overall
Team	W		L	PCT	W		L	PCT
Saint Mary's	12	–	2	.857	25	–	5	.833
Pepperdine	10	–	4	.714	20	–	13	.606
Loyola Marymount †	10	–	4	.714	20	–	11	.645
San Francisco	8	–	6	.571	16	–	12	.571
Santa Clara	7	–	7	.500	20	–	11	.645
Gonzaga	5	–	9	.357	14	–	14	.500
San Diego	2	–	12	.143	8	–	20	.286
Portland	2	–	12	.143	2	–	26	.071
† Conference tournament winner Rankings from AP poll

1988–89 WAC men's basketball standings
	Conf.				Overall
Team	W		L	PCT	W		L	PCT
Colorado State	12	–	4	.750	23	–	10	.697
UTEP †	11	–	5	.688	26	–	7	.788
New Mexico	11	–	5	.688	22	–	11	.667
Hawaii	9	–	7	.563	17	–	13	.567
BYU	7	–	9	.438	14	–	15	.483
Air Force	6	–	10	.375	14	–	14	.500
Wyoming	6	–	10	.375	14	–	17	.452
Utah	6	–	10	.375	16	–	17	.485
San Diego State	4	–	12	.250	12	–	17	.414
† 1989 WAC tournament winner Rankings from AP Poll

=== Division I independents ===
A total of 23 college teams played as Division I independents. Among them, Akron (21–8) had the best winning percentage (.724) and Akron, Notre Dame (21–9), and DePaul (21–12) finished with the most wins.

1988–89 NCAA Division I men's basketball independents standings
	Conf.				Overall
Team	W		L	PCT	W		L	PCT
Akron		–		–	21	–	8	.724
Notre Dame		–		–	21	–	9	.700
DePaul		–		–	21	–	12	.636
Miami (FL)		–		–	19	–	12	.613
UMBC		–		–	17	–	11	.607
Wright State		–		–	17	–	11	.607
Marquette		–		–	13	–	15	.464
Mount St. Mary's		–		–	12	–	15	.444
Chicago State		–		–	12	–	16	.429
Nicholls State		–		–	12	–	16	.429
Northern Illinois		–		–	11	–	17	.393
U.S. International		–		–	11	–	17	.393
Liberty		–		–	10	–	17	.370
Central Connecticut State		–		–	10	–	18	.357
Florida International		–		–	10	–	18	.357
Southern Utah		–		–	10	–	18	.357
UMKC		–		–	9	–	18	.333
Oral Roberts		–		–	8	–	20	.286
Central Florida		–		–	7	–	20	.259
Davidson		–		–	7	–	24	.226
Youngstown State		–		–	5	–	23	.179
Brooklyn		–		–	4	–	23	.148
Southeastern Louisiana		–		–	3	–	24	.111
Rankings from AP Poll

=== Informal championships ===
Conference	Regular season winner	Most Valuable Player
Philadelphia Big 5	La Salle & Temple	Lionel Simmons, La Salle

La Salle and Temple both finished with 3–1 records in head-to-head competition among the Philadelphia Big 5.

=== Statistical leaders ===
Points per game			Rebounds per game			Assists per game			Blocked shots per game		
Player	School	PPG	Player	School	RPG	Player	School	APG	Player	School	BPG
Hank Gathers	Loyola Marymount	32.7	Hank Gathers	Loyola Marymount	13.7	Glenn Williams	Holy Cross	9.9	Alonzo Mourning	Georgetown	5.0
Chris Jackson	LSU	30.2	Carl Herrera	Jacksonville	13.2	Chris Corchiani	NC State	8.8	Duane Causwell	Temple	4.1
Lionel Simmons	La Salle	28.4	Tyrone Hill	Xavier	12.2	Sherman Douglas	Syracuse	8.6	Alan Ogg	UAB	3.8
Gerald Glass	Ole Miss	28.0	Ron Draper	American	12.0	Gary Payton	Oregon State	8.1	Derrick Coleman	Syracuse	3.4
Blue Edwards	East Carolina	26.7	Daryl Battles	Southern	11.6	Anthony Manuel	Bradley	8.0	Eric Murdock	Providence	3.3

== Postseason tournaments ==
=== NCAA tournament ===
==== Final Four - Kingdome, Seattle, Washington ====
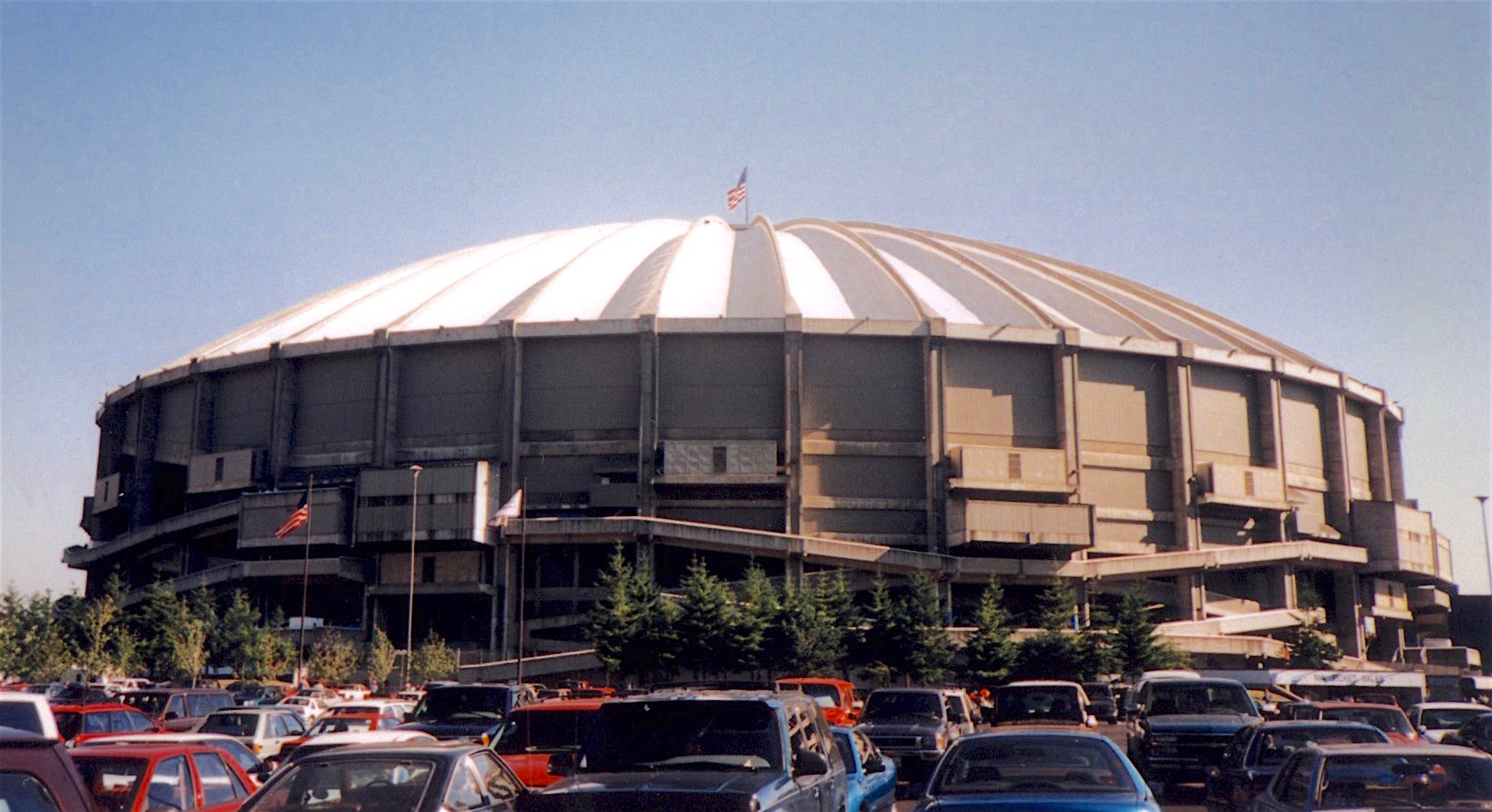
The Kingdome in Seattle, Washington, hosted the NCAA men's Final Four.

National semifinals
E2	Duke	78
W3	Seton Hall	95
S3	Michigan	83
M1	Illinois	81

National championship game
W3	Seton Hall	79*
S3	Michigan	80

(* – Denotes Overtime)

=== National Invitation tournament ===
==== NIT Semifinals and Final ====
Semifinals
UAB	65
St. John's	76
Michigan State	64
Saint Louis	74

Finals
St. John's	73
Saint Louis	65

Third place game
UAB	78
Michigan State	76

== Award winners ==
=== Consensus All-American teams ===
Consensus First Team
Player	Position	Class	Team
Sean Elliott	F	Senior	Arizona
Pervis Ellison	C	Senior	Louisville
Danny Ferry	F	Senior	Duke
Chris Jackson	G	Freshman	Louisiana State
Stacey King	C	Senior	Oklahoma

Consensus Second Team
Player	Position	Class	Team
Mookie Blaylock	G	Senior	Oklahoma
Sherman Douglas	G	Senior	Syracuse
Jay Edwards	G	Sophomore	Indiana
Todd Lichti	G	Senior	Stanford
Glen Rice	F	Senior	Michigan
Lionel Simmons	F	Junior	La Salle

=== Major player of the year awards ===
- Wooden Award: Sean Elliott, Arizona
- Naismith Award: Danny Ferry, Duke
- Associated Press Player of the Year: Sean Elliott, Arizona
- UPI Player of the Year: Danny Ferry, Duke
- NABC Player of the Year: Sean Elliott, Arizona
- Oscar Robertson Trophy (USBWA): Danny Ferry, Duke
- Adolph Rupp Trophy: Sean Elliott, Arizona
- Sporting News Player of the Year: Stacey King, Oklahoma

=== Major freshman of the year awards ===
- USBWA National Freshman of the Year: Chris Jackson, LSU

=== Major coach of the year awards ===
- Associated Press Coach of the Year: Bob Knight, Indiana
- UPI Coach of the Year: Bob Knight, Indiana
- Henry Iba Award (USBWA): Bob Knight, Indiana
- NABC Coach of the Year: P. J. Carlesimo, Seton Hall
- Naismith College Coach of the Year: Mike Krzyzewski, Duke
- CBS/Chevrolet Coach of the Year: Lute Olson, Arizona
- Sporting News Coach of the Year: P. J. Carlesimo, Seton Hall

=== Other major awards ===
- Frances Pomeroy Naismith Award (Best player under 6'0): Tim Hardaway, UTEP
- Robert V. Geasey Trophy (Top player in Philadelphia Big 5): Lionel Simmons, La Salle
- NIT/Haggerty Award (Top player in New York City metro area): John Morton, Seton Hall

== Coaching changes ==
A number of teams changed coaches during the season and after it ended.

Team	Former Coach	Interim Coach	New Coach	Reason
Akron	Bob Huggins		Coleman Crawford	Huggins left to coach Cincinnati.
Alcorn State	Davey Whitney		Lonnie Walker	
Arizona State	Steve Patterson	Bob Schermerhorn	Bill Frieder	Patterson resigned on February 4 under pressure and assistant Schermerhorn completed the season as interim. Michigan coach Frieder took the job at the conclusion of the season.
Auburn	Sonny Smith		Tommy Joe Eagles	Smith left to coach VCU.
Ball State	Rick Majerus		Dick Hunsaker	
Butler	Joe Sexson		Barry Collier	Collier was hired from the Stanford coaching staff.
BYU	LaDell Andersen		Roger Reid	
Central Florida	Phil Carter		Joe Dean Jr.	
Cincinnati	Tony Yates		Bob Huggins	
Colgate	Joe Baker		Jack Bruen	
Dayton	Don Donoher		Jim O'Brien	Donoher left to join Indiana's coaching staff. O'Brien was hired from the New York Knicks coaching staff.
Eastern Kentucky	Max Good		Mike Pollio	
Grambling State	Bob Hopkins		Aaron James	
Illinois State	Bob Donewald		Bob Bender	Donewald left to coach Western Michigan.
Indiana State	Ron Greene		Tates Locke	
Jackson State	John Prince		Andy Stoglin	
Kentucky	Eddie Sutton		Rick Pitino	
Louisiana Tech	Tommy Joe Eagles		Jerry Loyd	Eagles left to coach Auburn.
Loyola (IL)	Gene Sullivan		Will Rey	
Loyola (MD)	Mark Amatucci		Tom Schneider	
Marshall	Rick Huckabay		Dana Altman	
Marquette	Bob Dukiet		Kevin O'Neill	
Maryland	Bob Wade		Gary Williams	
Mercer	Bill Bibb		Brad Siegfried	
Michigan	Bill Frieder	Steve Fisher		Frieder announced he would take the Arizona State job before the 1989 NCAA Tournament but was immediately fired by Michigan AD Bo Schembechler, saying he wanted a “Michigan man” to lead the team. Assistant Fisher then led the team to the national title as interim and was made full-time coach after.
Morgan State	Nat Frazier		Nathaniel Taylor	
New Hampshire	Gerry Friel		Jim Boylan	Boylan was hired from the Michigan State staff.
Niagara	Andy Walker		Jack Armstrong	
Northern Illinois	Jim Rosborough		Jim Molinari	
Ohio	Billy Hahn		Larry Hunter	
Ohio State	Gary Williams		Randy Ayers	
Oregon State	Ralph Miller		Jim Anderson	
Penn	Tom Schneider		Fran Dunphy	
Rider	John Barker Carpenter		Kevin Bannon	
Saint Mary's	Lynn Nance		Paul Landreaux	Nance left to coach Washington.
Sam Houston State	Gary Moss	Jerry Dittman	Larry Brown	
San Jose State	Bill Berry		Stan Morrison	
St. Bonaventure	Ron DeCarli		Tom Chapman	
Tennessee	Don DeVoe		Wade Houston	
Tennessee State	Larry Reid		Ron Abernathy	
Utah	Lynn Archibald		Rick Majerus	
Vanderbilt	C. M. Newton		Eddie Fogler	Newton left to become athletic director at his alma mater, Kentucky.
VCU	Mike Pollio		Sonny Smith	Pollio left to coach Eastern Kentucky.
Wagner	Neil Kennett		Tim Capstraw	
Wake Forest	Bob Staak		Dave Odom	Staak left to join the Los Angeles Clippers coaching staff.
Washington	Andy Russo		Lynn Nance	
Western Carolina	Dave Possinger		Greg Blatt	
Western Michigan	Vernon Payne		Bob Donewald	
Wichita State	Eddie Fogler		Mike Cohen	Fogler left to coach Vanderbilt.
Youngstown State	Jim Cleamons		John Stroia	Cleamons left to join the Chicago Bulls coaching staff.
