= 1988–89 Tennessee Volunteers basketball team =

American college basketball season

1988–89 Tennessee Volunteers basketball

NCAA tournament
- Conference: Southeastern Conference
- East
- Record: 19–11 (11–7 SEC)
- Head coach: Don DeVoe (11th season)
- Assistant coach: Coleman Crawford
- Home arena: Thompson–Boling Arena

1988–89 Southeastern Conference men's basketball standings
	Conf.				Overall
Team	W		L	PCT	W		L	PCT
Florida	13	–	5	.722	21	–	13	.618
No. 20 Alabama †	12	–	6	.667	23	–	8	.742
Vanderbilt	12	–	6	.667	19	–	14	.576
LSU	11	–	7	.611	20	–	12	.625
Tennessee	11	–	7	.611	19	–	11	.633
Kentucky	8	–	10	.444	13	–	19	.406
Ole Miss	8	–	10	.444	15	–	15	.500
Mississippi State	7	–	11	.389	13	–	15	.464
Georgia	6	–	12	.333	15	–	16	.484
Auburn	2	–	16	.111	9	–	19	.321
† 1989 SEC tournament winner Rankings from AP poll

The 1988–89 Tennessee Volunteers basketball team represented the University of Tennessee as a member of the Southeastern Conference during the 1988–89 college basketball season. Led by head coach Don DeVoe, the team played their home games at Thompson–Boling Arena in Knoxville, Tennessee. The Volunteers finished with a record of 19–11 (11–7 SEC, 5th) and received an at-large bid to the 1989 NCAA tournament as the 10 seed in the East region.

== Roster ==
1988–89 Tennessee Volunteers men's basketball team
Players
Coaches

Pos.	#	Name	Height	Weight	Year	Hometown
G	10	Jay Price	6 ft 2 in (1.88 m)	—	Fr	Chattanooga, Tennessee
G	11	Clarence Swearengen	6 ft 3 in (1.91 m)	—	Sr	Memphis, Tennessee
G	15	Ron Taylor	6 ft 3 in (1.91 m)	—	Jr	Moulton, Alabama
F	20	Tim McConnell	6 ft 5 in (1.96 m)	—	So	Kingsport, Tennessee
G	21	Eric Smith	6 ft 1 in (1.85 m)	—	So	Chattanooga, Tennessee
G	22	Joe Carroll	5 ft 10 in (1.78 m)	—	Fr	Duff, Tennessee
G	23	Greg Bell	6 ft 2 in (1.88 m)	—	So	London, West Virginia
G	24	Rickey Clark	6 ft 5 in (1.96 m)	—	So	Lithonia, Georgia
G	25	Travis Henry	6 ft 2 in (1.88 m)	—	Sr	Knoxville, Tennessee
F	31	Dyron Nix	6 ft 7 in (2.01 m)	210 lb (95 kg)	Sr	Fort Walton Beach, Florida
F	33	Mark Griffin	6 ft 8 in (2.03 m)	—	Sr	Union City, Tennessee
F	34	Ronnie Reese	6 ft 8 in (2.03 m)	—	So	Franklin, Virginia
G	35	Eric Turner	6 ft 4 in (1.93 m)	—	Sr	Carson, California
F	40	Shaun Thompson	6 ft 7 in (2.01 m)	—	Fr	Fitzgerald, Georgia
C	50	Doug Roth	6 ft 11 in (2.11 m)	210 lb (95 kg)	Sr	Knoxville, Tennessee
C	51	Ian Lockhart	6 ft 8 in (2.03 m)	—	Jr	Nassau, Bahamas

Head coach

- Don DeVoe (Ohio State)

Assistant coach(es)

- Coleman Crawford (North Alabama)

Legend

- (C) Team captain
- (S) Suspended
- (I) Ineligible
- (W) Walk-on
- Injured
- Current redshirt

Roster

== Schedule and results ==
Date time, TV	Rank^{#}	Opponent^{#}	Result	Record	Site (attendance) city, state
Regular season
Nov 25, 1988*		Tennessee Tech	W 118–86	1–0	Thompson-Boling Arena; Knoxville, Tennessee
Nov 28, 1988		at Ole Miss	W 84–79	2–0 (1–0)	Tad Smith Coliseum; Oxford, Mississippi
Dec 3, 1988*	No. 20	Chattanooga	W 91–76	3–0	Thompson-Boling Arena; Knoxville, Tennessee
Dec 5, 1988*	No. 20	VMI	W 84–82 ^{2OT}	4–0	Thompson-Boling Arena; Knoxville, Tennessee
Dec 17, 1988*	No. 16	South Carolina	L 81–83 ^{OT}	4–1	Thompson-Boling Arena; Knoxville, Tennessee
Dec 20, 1988*	No. 19	vs. UAB; McDonald's Classic	W 111–99	5–1	Peterson Gymnasium; San Diego, California
Dec 20, 1988*	No. 19	at San Diego State; McDonald's Classic	W 77–75	6–1	Peterson Gymnasium; San Diego, California
Dec 28, 1988*	No. 19	Miami (OH); Volunteer Classic	W 94–83	7–1	Thompson-Boling Arena; Knoxville, Tennessee
Dec 29, 1988*	No. 19	Memphis State; Volunteer Classic	W 76–74	8–1	Thompson-Boling Arena; Knoxville, Tennessee
Jan 4, 1989	No. 17	at Auburn	W 84–73	9–1 (2–0)	Joel H. Eaves Memorial Coliseum; Auburn, Alabama
Jan 7, 1989	No. 17	at Mississippi State	W 86–85	10–1 (3–0)	Humphrey Coliseum; Starkville, Mississippi
Jan 11, 1989; JPT	No. 17	LSU	W 100–96	11–1 (4–0)	Thompson-Boling Arena; Knoxville, Tennessee
Jan 15, 1989*	No. 17	at No. 14 Florida State	L 90–101	11–2	Tallahassee-Leon County Civic Center; Tallahassee, Florida
Jan 18, 1989	No. 18	Florida	W 83–76	12–2 (5–0)	Thompson-Boling Arena; Knoxville, Tennessee
Jan 21, 1989	No. 18	Kentucky; Rivalry	L 65–66	12–3 (5–1)	Thompson-Boling Arena; Knoxville, Tennessee
Jan 25, 1989		at Alabama	L 85–87 ^{OT}	12–4 (5–2)	Coleman Coliseum; Tuscaloosa, Alabama
Jan 28, 1989		Georgia	L 73–74	12–5 (5–3)	Thompson-Boling Arena; Knoxville, Tennessee
Feb 1, 1989		Vanderbilt; Rivalry	L 56–68	12–6 (5–4)	Thompson-Boling Arena; Knoxville, Tennessee
Feb 4, 1989; 4:00 p.m., JPT		Auburn	W 89–72	13–6 (6–4)	Thompson-Boling Arena; Knoxville, Tennessee
Feb 8, 1989		Mississippi State	W 81–71	14–6 (7–4)	Thompson-Boling Arena; Knoxville, Tennessee
Feb 11, 1989; 1:00 p.m., JPT		at LSU	L 106–122	14–7 (7–5)	Maravich Assembly Center; Baton Rouge, Louisiana
Feb 15, 1989		Ole Miss	W 83–71	15–7 (8–5)	Thompson-Boling Arena; Knoxville, Tennessee
Feb 18, 1989		at Florida	L 81–99	15–8 (8–6)	O'Connell Center; Gainesville, Florida
Feb 22, 1989		at Kentucky; Rivalry	L 71–76	15–9 (8–7)	Rupp Arena; Lexington, Kentucky
Feb 25, 1989		Alabama	W 84–69	16–9 (9–7)	Thompson-Boling Arena; Knoxville, Tennessee
Mar 1, 1989		at Georgia	W 75–68	17–9 (10–7)	Stegeman Coliseum; Athens, Georgia
Mar 4, 1989		Vanderbilt; Rivalry	W 78–61	18–9 (11–7)	Thompson-Boling Arena; Knoxville, Tennessee
SEC tournament
Mar 10, 1989*; JPT	(5)	(4) LSU; SEC Tournament Quarterfinal	W 95–77	19–9	Thompson-Boling Arena; Knoxville, Tennessee
Mar 11, 1989*; JPT	(5)	(1) Florida; SEC Tournament Semifinal	L 71–76	19–10	Thompson-Boling Arena; Knoxville, Tennessee
NCAA tournament
Mar 16, 1989*	(10 E)	vs. (7 E) No. 17 West Virginia; First Round	L 68–84	19–11	Greensboro Coliseum; Greensboro, North Carolina
*Non-conference game. ^{#}Rankings from AP poll. (#) Tournament seedings in parentheses. E=East. All times are in Eastern Time.

== NBA draft ==
Round	Pick	Player	NBA club
2	29	Dyron Nix	Charlotte Hornets
2	41	Doug Roth	Washington Bullets
