= 1988–89 Vanderbilt Commodores men's basketball team =

American college basketball season

1988–89 Vanderbilt Commodores men's basketball

NCAA tournament, Round of 64
- Conference: Southeastern Conference
- Record: 19–14 (12–6 SEC)
- Head coach: C. M. Newton (8th season)
- Home arena: Memorial Gymnasium

1988–89 Southeastern Conference men's basketball standings
| | Conf. | | | | Overall |
| Team | W | | L | PCT | W | | L | PCT |
|---|---|---|---|---|---|---|---|---|
| Florida | 13 | – | 5 | .722 | 21 | – | 13 | .618 |
| No. 20 Alabama † | 12 | – | 6 | .667 | 23 | – | 8 | .742 |
| Vanderbilt | 12 | – | 6 | .667 | 19 | – | 14 | .576 |
| LSU | 11 | – | 7 | .611 | 20 | – | 12 | .625 |
| Tennessee | 11 | – | 7 | .611 | 19 | – | 11 | .633 |
| Kentucky | 8 | – | 10 | .444 | 13 | – | 19 | .406 |
| Ole Miss | 8 | – | 10 | .444 | 15 | – | 15 | .500 |
| Mississippi State | 7 | – | 11 | .389 | 13 | – | 15 | .464 |
| Georgia | 6 | – | 12 | .333 | 15 | – | 16 | .484 |
| Auburn | 2 | – | 16 | .111 | 9 | – | 19 | .321 |
† 1989 SEC tournament winner Rankings from AP poll

The 1988–89 Vanderbilt Commodores men's basketball men's basketball team represented Vanderbilt University as a member of the Southeastern Conference during the 1988–89 college basketball season. The team was led by head coach C. M. Newton and played its home games at Memorial Gymnasium.

The Commodores finished with a 19–14 record (12–6 SEC, 3rd) and received an at-large bid to the NCAA tournament.

== Roster ==
1988–89 Vanderbilt Commodores men's basketball team
Players
Coaches

| Pos. | # | Name | Height | Weight | Year | Hometown |
|---|---|---|---|---|---|---|
| G | 4 | Barry Booker | 6 ft 4 in (1.93 m) | — | Sr |
| G | 12 | Barry Goheen | 6 ft 3 in (1.91 m) | — | Sr | Marshall County, Kentucky |
| F | 34 | Frank Kornet | 6 ft 9 in (2.06 m) | 225 lb (102 kg) | Sr | Lexington, Kentucky |

Head coach

- C. M. Newton (Kentucky)

Assistant coach(es)

Legend

- (C) Team captain
- (S) Suspended
- (I) Ineligible
- (W) Walk-on
- Injured
- Current redshirt

== Schedule and results ==
| Date time, TV | Rank^{#} | Opponent^{#} | Result | Record | Site (attendance) city, state |
Regular season
| Nov 25, 1988*; ESPN | | vs. No. 3 Michigan; Maui Invitational | L 61–91 | 0–1 | Lahaina Civic Center; Lahaina, Hawaii |
| Nov 26, 1988* | | at Chaminade; Maui Invitational | W 94–70 | 1–1 | Lahaina Civic Center; Lahaina, Hawaii |
| Nov 27, 1988* | | vs. No. 16 Ohio State; Maui Invitational | L 82–97 | 1–2 | Lahaina Civic Center; Lahaina, Hawaii |
| Nov 30, 1988* | | No. 13 Louisville | W 65–62 | 2–2 | Memorial Gymnasium; Nashville, Tennessee |
| Dec 3, 1988* | | at Alabama-Birmingham | L 69–76 | 2–3 | Bartow Arena; Birmingham, Alabama |
| Dec 7, 1988* | | at No. 8 North Carolina | L 77–89 | 2–4 | Dean Smith Center; Chapel Hill, North Carolina |
| Dec 10, 1988* | | at Kansas State | L 62–71 | 2–5 | Bramlage Coliseum; Manhattan, Kansas |
| Dec 14, 1988 | | Auburn | W 93–77 | 3–5 (1–0) | Memorial Gymnasium; Nashville, Tennessee |
| Dec 19, 1988* | | Murray State | W 74–57 | 4–5 | Memorial Gymnasium; Nashville, Tennessee |
| Dec 22, 1988* | | Dartmouth | W 92–67 | 5–5 | Memorial Gymnasium; Nashville, Tennessee |
| Dec 29, 1988* | | Colgate; Music City Invitational | W 91–55 | 6–5 | Memorial Gymnasium; Nashville, Tennessee |
| Dec 30, 1988* | | Stanford; Music City Invitational | L 68–89 | 6–6 | Memorial Gymnasium; Nashville, Tennessee |
| Jan 4, 1989 | | Alabama | W 73–53 | 7–6 (2–0) | Memorial Gymnasium; Nashville, Tennessee |
| Jan 7, 1989 | | at Kentucky | L 61–70 | 7–7 (2–1) | Rupp Arena; Lexington, Kentucky |
| Jan 11, 1989 | | at Ole Miss | W 72–65 | 8–7 (3–1) | Tad Smith Coliseum; Oxford, Mississippi |
| Jan 14, 1989; 2:00 p.m., JPT | | Georgia | W 76–75 | 9–7 (4–1) | Memorial Gymnasium; Nashville, Tennessee |
| Jan 18, 1989; 7:00 p.m., JPT | | at LSU | L 85–86 | 9–8 (4–2) | Maravich Assembly Center; Baton Rouge, Louisiana |
| Jan 21, 1989*; CBS | | Texas | W 94–79 | 10–8 | Memorial Gymnasium; Nashville, Tennessee |
| Jan 25, 1989 | | Florida | L 78–81 | 10–9 (4–3) | Memorial Gymnasium; Nashville, Tennessee |
| Jan 28, 1989 | | at Mississippi State | W 81–70 | 11–9 (5–3) | Humphrey Coliseum; Starkville, Mississippi |
| Feb 1, 1989 | | Tennessee | W 68–56 | 12–9 (6–3) | Memorial Gymnasium; Nashville, Tennessee |
| Feb 4, 1989 | | at Alabama | L 67–77 | 12–10 (6–4) | Coleman Coliseum; Tuscaloosa, Alabama |
| Feb 8, 1989; 7:00 p.m., JPT | | Kentucky | W 81–51 | 13–10 (7–4) | Memorial Gymnasium; Nashville, Tennessee |
| Feb 11, 1989 | | Ole Miss | W 71–69 | 14–10 (8–4) | Memorial Gymnasium; Nashville, Tennessee |
| Feb 15, 1989 | | at Georgia | W 85–72 | 15–10 (9–4) | Stegeman Coliseum; Athens, Georgia |
| Feb 18, 1989; 2:00 p.m., JPT | | No. 20 LSU | W 108–74 | 16–10 (10–4) | Memorial Gymnasium; Nashville, Tennessee |
| Feb 22, 1989 | | at Auburn | W 77–62 | 17–10 (11–4) | Beard–Eaves–Memorial Coliseum; Auburn, Alabama |
| Feb 25, 1989; 2:00 p.m., JPT | | at Florida | L 80–83 | 17–11 (11–5) | Stephen C. O'Connell Center; Gainesville, Florida |
| Mar 1, 1989 | | Mississippi State | W 77–58 | 18–11 (12–5) | Memorial Gymnasium; Nashville, Tennessee |
| Mar 4, 1989 | | at Tennessee | L 61–78 | 18–12 (12–6) | Thompson-Boling Arena; Knoxville, Tennessee |
SEC tournament
| Mar 10, 1989*; JPT | | vs. Kentucky; SEC Tournament Quarterfinal | W 77–63 | 19–12 | Thompson-Boling Arena; Knoxville, Tennessee |
| Mar 11, 1989*; JPT | | vs. Alabama; SEC Tournament Semifinal | L 79–83 | 19–13 | Thompson-Boling Arena; Knoxville, Tennessee |
NCAA tournament
| Mar 17, 1989* | (8 E) | vs. (9 E) Notre Dame | L 65–81 | 18–14 | Providence Civic Center; Providence, Rhode Island |
*Non-conference game. ^{#}Rankings from AP Poll. (#) Tournament seedings in parentheses. E=East. All times are in Central Time.

== NBA draft ==
| Round | Pick | Player | NBA club |
|---|---|---|---|
| 2 | 30 | Frank Kornet | Milwaukee Bucks |
