= 1989 Big South Conference men's basketball tournament =

- Classification: Division I
- Season: 1988–89
- Teams: 7
- Site: Winthrop Coliseum; Rock Hill, SC
- Champions: UNC Asheville (1st title)
- Winning coach: Don Doucette (1st title)
- MVP: Milton Moore (UNC Asheville)

1988–89 Big South Conference men's basketball standings
	Conf.				Overall
Team	W		L	PCT	W		L	PCT
Coastal Carolina	9	–	3	.750	14	–	14	.500
Campbell	8	–	4	.667	18	–	12	.600
Baptist	6	–	6	.500	12	–	16	.429
UNC Asheville †	6	–	6	.500	16	–	14	.533
Radford	5	–	7	.417	15	–	13	.536
Winthrop	5	–	7	.417	16	–	13	.552
Augusta State	3	–	9	.250	5	–	23	.179
† 1989 Big South tournament winner Rankings from AP Poll

The 1989 Big South Conference men's basketball tournament took place March 2–4, 1989, at the Winthrop Coliseum in Rock Hill, South Carolina. For the first time in their school history, the UNC Asheville Bulldogs won the tournament, led by head coach Don Doucette.

== Format ==
All of the conference's seven members participated in the tournament, hosted at the Winthrop Coliseum, home of the Winthrop Eagles. Teams were seeded by conference winning percentage.

== Bracket ==
Quarterfinals; March 2
4	UNC Asheville	62
5	Radford	58
2	Campbell	90
7	Augusta State	84
3	Baptist	68
6	Winthrop	81

Semifinals; March 3
1	Coastal Carolina	76
4	UNC Asheville	88
2	Campbell	78
6	Winthrop	55

Finals; March 4
2	Campbell	78
4	UNC Asheville	93

- Source

== All-Tournament Team ==
- Milton Moore, UNC Asheville
- Harvey Shropshire, UNC Asheville
- Brent Keck, UNC Asheville
- Mark Mocnik, Campbell
- Henry Wilson, Campbell
- Greg Washington, Winthrop

This was the last year in which six players were selected to the All-Tournament Team. It was reduced to five the following year.
