= 1988–89 Kentucky Wildcats men's basketball team =

1988–89 season of University of Kentucky men's basketball team

1988–89 Kentucky Wildcats men's basketball
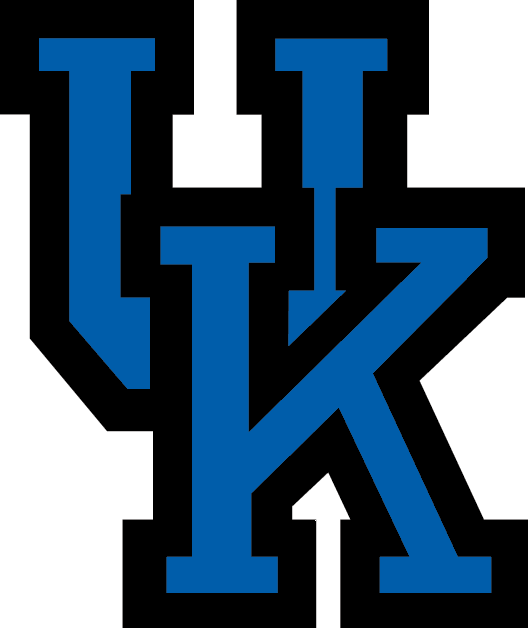
- Conference: Southeastern Conference
- Record: 13–19 (8–10 SEC)
- Head coach: Eddie Sutton (4th season)
- Home arena: Rupp Arena

1988–89 Southeastern Conference men's basketball standings
| | Conf. | | | | Overall |
| Team | W | | L | PCT | W | | L | PCT |
|---|---|---|---|---|---|---|---|---|
| Florida | 13 | – | 5 | .722 | 21 | – | 13 | .618 |
| No. 20 Alabama † | 12 | – | 6 | .667 | 23 | – | 8 | .742 |
| Vanderbilt | 12 | – | 6 | .667 | 19 | – | 14 | .576 |
| LSU | 11 | – | 7 | .611 | 20 | – | 12 | .625 |
| Tennessee | 11 | – | 7 | .611 | 19 | – | 11 | .633 |
| Kentucky | 8 | – | 10 | .444 | 13 | – | 19 | .406 |
| Ole Miss | 8 | – | 10 | .444 | 15 | – | 15 | .500 |
| Mississippi State | 7 | – | 11 | .389 | 13 | – | 15 | .464 |
| Georgia | 6 | – | 12 | .333 | 15 | – | 16 | .484 |
| Auburn | 2 | – | 16 | .111 | 9 | – | 19 | .321 |
† 1989 SEC tournament winner Rankings from AP poll

The 1988–89 Kentucky Wildcats men's basketball team represented University of Kentucky in the 1988–89 NCAA Division I men's basketball season. The team played its home game in Lexington, Kentucky at Rupp Arena. The team was led by fourth-year head coach Eddie Sutton.

== Scandal and resignation ==
After the season, Head Coach Eddie Sutton’s tenure at Kentucky ended after a scandal and a losing record tarnished the school's basketball program.

Kentucky entered the season lacking significant talents in their lineup. Sophomore standout Eric Manuel was suspected of cheating on his college entrance exam and agreed to sit out until the investigation was finished. Potential star recruit Shawn Kemp transferred out of Kentucky after signing with the school earlier that year.

Another scandal broke when it was alleged that some employees from Emery Worldwide discovered $1,000 cash in an envelope sent by Kentucky Assistant head coach Dwane Casey to Chris Mills father. It was later shown that Casey was uninvolved in the incident.

== Losing season ==
The Wildcats were placed in the hands of inexperienced sophomore LeRon Ellis and freshman Chris Mills. The two underclassmen struggled to fill in the talent on the court, resulting in the Wildcats' first full season losing record (13–19) since 1927.
