= 1989 SEC men's basketball tournament =

College basketball tournament

- Classification: Division I
- Season: 1988–89
- Teams: 10
- Site: Thompson–Boling Arena; Knoxville, Tennessee
- Champions: Alabama (4th title)
- Winning coach: Wimp Sanderson (2nd title)
- MVP: Livingston Chatman (Florida)
- Attendance: 134,280 (average 14,920 per game)
- Television: JP Sports (First and Second Rounds, and semifinals); ABC (Championship Game)

1988–89 Southeastern Conference men's basketball standings
	Conf.				Overall
Team	W		L	PCT	W		L	PCT
Florida	13	–	5	.722	21	–	13	.618
No. 20 Alabama †	12	–	6	.667	23	–	8	.742
Vanderbilt	12	–	6	.667	19	–	14	.576
LSU	11	–	7	.611	20	–	12	.625
Tennessee	11	–	7	.611	19	–	11	.633
Kentucky	8	–	10	.444	13	–	19	.406
Ole Miss	8	–	10	.444	15	–	15	.500
Mississippi State	7	–	11	.389	13	–	15	.464
Georgia	6	–	12	.333	15	–	16	.484
Auburn	2	–	16	.111	9	–	19	.321
† 1989 SEC tournament winner Rankings from AP poll

The 1989 SEC Men's Basketball Tournament took place from March 9–12, 1989 at the University of Tennessee’s Thompson–Boling Arena in Knoxville, Tennessee. The Alabama Crimson Tide won the tournament and received the SEC's automatic bid to the NCAA Division I Men's Basketball tournament by defeating Florida by a score of 72–60 in the championship game on March 12, 1989.

JP Sports, in its third season of producing regionally syndicated SEC basketball games, provided television coverage of the first round, the quarterfinals, and the semifinals. Coverage of the championship game was broadcast on the ABC Television Network through its sports division, ABC Sports.

== Bracket ==
First Round; Thursday, March 9 Jefferson-Pilot Teleproductions
8	Mississippi State	68
9	Georgia	83
7	Ole Miss	80
10	Auburn	68

Quarterfinals; Friday, March 10; Jefferson-Pilot Teleproductions
1	Florida	62
9	Georgia	61
4	LSU	77
5	Tennessee	95
2	Alabama	64
7	Ole Miss	56
3	Vanderbilt	77
6	Kentucky	63

Semifinals; Saturday, March 11; Jefferson-Pilot Teleproductions
1	Florida	76
5	Tennessee	71
2	Alabama	83
3	Vanderbilt	79

Championship game Sunday, March 12; ABC
1	Florida	60
2	Alabama	72

=== First Round ===
Jefferson-Pilot Teleproductions

March 9
7:30 p.m. EST

No. 9 Georgia Bulldogs 83, No. 8 Mississippi State Bulldogs 68
Scoring by half: 36–35, 47–33

Thompson–Boling Arena – Knoxville, Tennessee
Attendance: 12,221
Referees: John Clougherty, Don Rutledge, Mac Chauvin

Jefferson-Pilot Teleproductions

March 9
10:00 p.m. EST

No. 7 Ole Miss Rebels 80, No. 10 Auburn Tigers 68
Scoring by half: 35–40, 45–28

Thompson–Boling Arena – Knoxville, Tennessee
Attendance: 12,221
Referees: Don Shea, Wally Tanner, Don Ferguson

=== Quarterfinals ===
Jefferson-Pilot Teleproductions

March 10
1:00 p.m. EST

No. 5 Tennessee Volunteers 95, No. 4 LSU Tigers 77
Scoring by half: 41–33, 54–44

Thompson–Boling Arena – Knoxville, Tennessee
Attendance: 17,187
Referees: Don Shea, Danny Hooker, David Jones

Jefferson-Pilot Teleproductions

March 10
3:30 p.m. EST

No. 3 Vanderbilt Commodores 77, No. 6 Kentucky Wildcats 63
Scoring by half: 38–30, 39–33

Thompson–Boling Arena – Knoxville, Tennessee
Attendance: 17,614
Referees: Don Rutledge, Don Ferguson, Andre Pattillo

Jefferson-Pilot Teleproductions

March 10
7:30 p.m. EST

No. 1 Florida Gators 62, No. 9 Georgia Bulldogs 61
Scoring by half: 30–41, 32–20

Thompson–Boling Arena – Knoxville, Tennessee
Attendance: 13,841
Referees: Allie Prescott, John Clougherty, Larry Ware

Jefferson-Pilot Teleproductions

March 10
10:00 p.m. EST

No. 2 Alabama Crimson Tide 64, No. 7 Ole Miss Rebels 56
Scoring by half: 33–29, 31–27

Thompson–Boling Arena – Knoxville, Tennessee
Attendance: 14,459
Referees: Wally Tanner, Mac Chauvin, Jake Bell

=== Semifinals ===
Jefferson-Pilot Teleproductions

March 11
1:00 p.m. EST

No. 1 Florida Gators 76, No. 5 Tennessee Volunteers 71
Scoring by half: 33–32, 43–39

Thompson–Boling Arena – Knoxville, Tennessee
Attendance: 17,453
Referees: John Clougherty, Don Shea, Wally Tanner

Jefferson-Pilot Teleproductions

March 11
3:30 p.m. EST

No. 2 Alabama Crimson Tide 83, No. 3 Vanderbilt Commodores 79
Scoring by half: 43–35, 40–44

Thompson–Boling Arena – Knoxville, Tennessee
Attendance: 17,742
Referees: Don Rutledge, Mac Chauvin, David Jones

=== Championship game ===
ABC

March 12
2:00 p.m. EST

No. 2 Alabama Crimson Tide 72, No. 1 Florida Gators 60
Scoring by half: 28–26, 44–34

Thompson–Boling Arena – Knoxville, Tennessee
Attendance: 11,285
Referees: John Clougherty, Don Shea, Don Ferguson
