= 1988–89 Florida Gators men's basketball team =

American college basketball season

1988–89 Florida Gators men's basketball

SEC Regular Season champions

NCAA tournament, first round
- Conference: Southeastern Conference
- Record: 21–13 (13–5 SEC)
- Head coach: Norm Sloan (9th season)
- Assistant coach: Monte Towe (9th season)
- Captain: Clifford Lett
- Home arena: O'Connell Center

1988–89 Southeastern Conference men's basketball standings
	Conf.				Overall
Team	W		L	PCT	W		L	PCT
Florida	13	–	5	.722	21	–	13	.618
No. 20 Alabama †	12	–	6	.667	23	–	8	.742
Vanderbilt	12	–	6	.667	19	–	14	.576
LSU	11	–	7	.611	20	–	12	.625
Tennessee	11	–	7	.611	19	–	11	.633
Kentucky	8	–	10	.444	13	–	19	.406
Ole Miss	8	–	10	.444	15	–	15	.500
Mississippi State	7	–	11	.389	13	–	15	.464
Georgia	6	–	12	.333	15	–	16	.484
Auburn	2	–	16	.111	9	–	19	.321
† 1989 SEC tournament winner Rankings from AP poll

The 1988–89 Florida Gators men's basketball team represented the University of Florida as a member of the Southeastern Conference during the 1988–89 NCAA men's basketball season. They were coached by Norm Sloan, who was in his ninth consecutive (and final) season at the school.

The Gators were ranked in the AP preseason poll for only the second time in program history despite the loss of both starting guards from the previous season, Vernon Maxwell and Ronnie Montgomery. They were expected to be led by steady senior guard Clifford Lett and star center Dwayne Schintzius, but while Lett stepped into his new starting role with aplomb, Schintzius was suspended four games for getting involved in an altercation outside a Gainesville nightclub in which he allegedly wielded a tennis racket.

Schintzius' temporary absence contributed to a disappointing start to the season, and the Gators' record stood at 5–7 after losing their first conference game in early January. However, the team improved markedly from that low point, with the turnaround beginning during a key conference road game at Vanderbilt. Florida committed a turnover with one second remaining while trailing 72–70, seemingly sealing a loss. However, before play resumed, several tennis balls were tossed onto the court from the stands, apparently in taunting reference to Schinztius's earlier altercation. The officials called a technical foul on the home team, and Schintzius hit the resulting two free throws to send the game into overtime. He then scored Florida's first seven points in the extra period to lead the Gators to an 81–78 win. The improbable win was the second victory in what grew into an 11-game conference streak that ran from mid-January until early March.

The Gators ended the season one game ahead of Vanderbilt and Alabama in the conference standings to earn the program's first ever regular season SEC basketball championship. They were the runners-up to Alabama in the SEC tournament and received their third consecutive at-large bid to the NCAA tournament as a #7 seed. However, a poor shooting performance led to an upset loss to Colorado State in the first round, ending the Gators' season.

Florida was again ranked in the AP preseason poll leading up to the following season, but days before the first game in November 1989, Sloan was forced to resign due to an NCAA investigation into the program. Dwayne Schintzius quit the team over conflicts with interim coach Don DeVoe, and the program's streak of consecutive NCAA tournament appearances ended in 1989–90 with their first losing record in six years.

== Roster ==
1988–89 Florida Gators men's basketball team
Players
Coaches

Pos.	#	Name	Height	Weight	Year	Previous school	Hometown
C		Dwayne Schintzius	7 ft 1 in (2.16 m)	—	Jr	Brandon	Brandon, Florida
G		Clifford Lett	6 ft 3 in (1.91 m)	—	Sr	Pensacola	Pensacola, Florida
G		Renaldo Garcia	6 ft 2 in (1.88 m)	—	Jr	Tampa Catholic	Tampa, Florida
F		Livingston Chatman	6 ft 7 in (2.01 m)	—	So	Kathleen	Lakeland, Florida
F		Dwayne Davis	6 ft 7 in (2.01 m)	—	So

Head coach

- Norm Sloan (NC State)

Assistant coach(es)

Monte Towe (NC State)

Legend

- (C) Team captain
- (S) Suspended
- (I) Ineligible
- (W) Walk-on
- Injured
- Current redshirt

== Schedule and results ==
Date time, TV	Rank^{#}	Opponent^{#}	Result	Record	Site city, state
Regular season
Nov 25, 1988*; ESPN	No. 15	vs. California; Great Alaska Shootout	L 58–73	0–1	Sullivan Arena; Anchorage, Alaska
Nov 26, 1988; ESPN	No. 15	at Alaska-Anchorage; Great Alaska Shootout	W 83–72	1–1	Sullivan Arena; Anchorage, Alaska
Nov 27, 1988*	No. 15	vs. Utah; Great Alaska Shootout	W 77–68	2–1	Sullivan Arena; Anchorage, Alaska
Nov 30, 1988*	No. 19	Siena	W 71–67	3–1	O'Connell Center; Gainesville, Florida
Dec 3, 1988*	No. 19	at No. 14 Florida State; Rivalry	L 86–114	3–2	Donald L. Tucker Center; Tallahassee, Florida
Dec 6, 1988*; ESPN		at No. 7 Illinois	L 67–97	3–3	Assembly Hall (15,020); Champaign, Illinois
Dec 10, 1988; ESPN		LSU	L 101–111	3–4 (0–1)	O'Connell Center; Gainesville, Florida
Dec 19, 1988*		Miami (FL)	W 101–81	4–4	O'Connell Center; Gainesville, Florida
Dec 22, 1988*; USA		Pittsburgh	L 87–90	4–5	O'Connell Center; Gainesville, Florida
Dec 27, 1988*		vs. No. 15 Ohio State	L 68–93	4–6	
Dec 28, 1988*		vs. Fordham	W 59–52	5–6	
Jan 5, 1989*; ESPN		at Ole Miss	L 71–80	5–7 (0–2)	Tad Smith Coliseum; Oxford, Mississippi
Jan 7, 1989		at No. 20 Georgia	W 80–66	6–7 (1–2)	Stegeman Coliseum; Athens, Georgia
Jan 9, 1989*		at South Florida	W 87–82	7–7	Sun Dome; Tampa, Florida
Jan 12, 1989; ESPN		Kentucky	L 56–69	7–8 (1–3)	O'Connell Center; Gainesville, Florida
Jan 14, 1989		at Auburn	W 75–71	8–8 (2–3)	Beard–Eaves–Memorial; Auburn, Alabama
Jan 18, 1989		at No. 18 Tennessee	L 76–83	8–9 (2–4)	Thompson-Boling Arena; Knoxville, Tennessee
Jan 21, 1989		Mississippi State	W 81–57	9–9 (3–4)	O'Connell Center; Gainesville, Florida
Jan 25, 1989		at Vanderbilt	W 81–78 ^{OT}	10–9 (4–4)	Memorial Gymnasium; Nashville, Tennessee
Feb 1, 1989; 8:00 p.m., JPT		Alabama	W 85–76	11–9 (5–4)	O'Connell Center; Gainesville, Florida
Feb 4, 1989*; CBS		vs. No. 20 Stanford	L 69–84	11–10	Orlando, Florida
Feb 5, 1989		Ole Miss	W 78–67	12–10 (6–4)	O'Connell Center; Gainesville, Florida
Feb 8, 1989; 8:00 p.m., JPT		Georgia	W 65–60	13–10 (7–4)	O'Connell Center; Gainesville, Florida
Feb 11, 1989; NBC		at Kentucky	W 59–53	14–10 (8–4)	Rupp Arena; Lexington, Kentucky
Feb 15, 1989		Auburn	W 90–79	15–10 (9–4)	O'Connell Center; Gainesville, Florida
Feb 18, 1989		Tennessee	W 99–81	16–10 (10–4)	O'Connell Center; Gainesville, Florida
Feb 22, 1989		at Mississippi State	W 78–69	17–10 (11–4)	Humphrey Coliseum; Starkville, Mississippi
Feb 25, 1989; JPT		Vanderbilt	W 83–80	18–10 (12–4)	O'Connell Center; Gainesville, Florida
Mar 1, 1989; JPT		at LSU	W 104–95	19–10 (13–4)	Maravich Assembly Center; Baton Rouge, Louisiana
Mar 4, 1989		at Alabama	L 63–83	19–11 (13–5)	Coleman Coliseum; Tuscaloosa, Alabama
SEC tournament
Mar 10, 1989*; JPT		vs. Georgia; SEC Tournament Quarterfinal	W 62–61	20–11	Thompson-Boling Arena; Knoxville, Tennessee
Mar 11, 1989*; JPT		at Tennessee; SEC Tournament Semifinal	W 76–71	21–11	Thompson-Boling Arena; Knoxville, Tennessee
Mar 12, 1989*; ABC		vs. Alabama; SEC tournament Championship	L 60–72	21–12	Thompson-Boling Arena; Knoxville, Tennessee
NCAA tournament
Mar 17, 1989*	(7 MW)	vs. (10 MW) Colorado State; First Round	L 46–68	21–13	Reunion Arena; Dallas, Texas
*Non-conference game. ^{#}Rankings from AP Poll. (#) Tournament seedings in parentheses. MW=Midwest. All times are in Eastern Time.
