= 1988–89 Auburn Tigers men's basketball team =

American college basketball season

1988–89 Auburn Tigers men's basketball
- Conference: Southeastern Conference
- Record: 9–19 (2–16 SEC)
- Head coach: Sonny Smith (11th season)
- Home arena: Joel H. Eaves Memorial Coliseum

1988–89 Southeastern Conference men's basketball standings
	Conf.				Overall
Team	W		L	PCT	W		L	PCT
Florida	13	–	5	.722	21	–	13	.618
No. 20 Alabama †	12	–	6	.667	23	–	8	.742
Vanderbilt	12	–	6	.667	19	–	14	.576
LSU	11	–	7	.611	20	–	12	.625
Tennessee	11	–	7	.611	19	–	11	.633
Kentucky	8	–	10	.444	13	–	19	.406
Ole Miss	8	–	10	.444	15	–	15	.500
Mississippi State	7	–	11	.389	13	–	15	.464
Georgia	6	–	12	.333	15	–	16	.484
Auburn	2	–	16	.111	9	–	19	.321
† 1989 SEC tournament winner Rankings from AP poll

The 1988–89 Auburn Tigers men's basketball team represented Auburn University in the 1988–89 college basketball season. The team's head coach was Sonny Smith, who was in his eleventh and final season at Auburn. The team played their home games at Joel H. Eaves Memorial Coliseum in Auburn, Alabama. They finished the season 9–19, 2–16 in SEC play. They lost to Ole Miss in the first round of the SEC tournament.

The Tigers' season was beset with many problems. Junior forward John Caylor, expected to be a key contributor this season, was lost after five games due to a life-threatening blood clot in his shoulder.

Junior guard Derrick Dennison, another key contributor from last season, quit the team over a feud with Coach Smith about a reduced role, but later returned. Additionally, forward Kelvin Ardister, a junior-college transfer, and freshman guard Johnny Benjamin were both dismissed from the team after seven games for violating team rules. Prior to his dismissal, Benjamin had been arrested and jailed on two misdemeanor charges, criminal trespassing and third-degree theft of property, when he entered a student's off-campus apartment and took an undisclosed amount of money.

After the season, coach Sonny Smith resigned and took the head coaching position at VCU.

== Roster ==
1988–89 Auburn Tigers men's basketball team
Players
Coaches

Pos.	#	Name	Height	Weight	Year	Previous school	Hometown
F	22	John Caylor	6 ft 6 in (1.98 m)	—	Jr	Morristown West High School	Talbott, Tennessee
C	25	Matt Geiger	7 ft 0 in (2.13 m)	—	So	Countryside High School	Clearwater, FL
G	30	Keenan Carpenter	6 ft 3 in (1.91 m)	—	Sr	Rutherfordton, Tennessee
G	24	Derrick Dennison	6 ft 4 in (1.93 m)	—	Jr	Douglass High School	Atlanta, Georgia
G	3	Kirt Hankton	6 ft 4 in (1.93 m)	—	Jr	De LaSalle High School	New Orleans, Louisiana
G	12	Johnny Benjamin	6 ft 2 in (1.88 m)	—	Fr	Central Florida Academy	Orlando, Florida
G	14	Reggie Gallon	5 ft 10 in (1.78 m)	—	Fr	Miami Edison High School	Miami, Florida
F	15	Kelvin Ardister	6 ft 5 in (1.96 m)	—	Jr	Southwest DeKalb High School	Decatur, Georgia
G	20	Dustin Hester	6 ft 2 in (1.88 m)	—	So	Crestview High School	Crestview, Alabama
G	21	Ronnie Battle	6 ft 1 in (1.85 m)	—	So	Chavala High School	Pittsview, Alabama
F	34	Robert McKie	6 ft 5 in (1.96 m)	—	So	Miami Carol City High School	Miami, Florida

Head coach

- Sonny Smith (Milligan)

Assistant coach(es)

Legend

- (C) Team captain
- (S) Suspended
- (I) Ineligible
- (W) Walk-on
- Injured
- Current redshirt

== Schedule and results ==
Date time, TV	Rank^{#}	Opponent^{#}	Result	Record	Site (attendance) city, state
Regular season
Nov 26, 1988*		Mount St. Mary's	W 89-83	1-0	Auburn, AL; Joel H. Eaves Memorial Coliseum
Nov 29, 1988*		Georgia State	W 74-70	2-0	Auburn, AL; Joel H. Eaves Memorial Coliseum
Dec 3, 1988*		Mercer	W 87-66	3-0	Joel H. Eaves Memorial Coliseum; Auburn, AL
Dec 10, 1988*		Texas Southern	W 109-81	4-0	Joel H. Eaves Memorial Coliseum; Auburn, AL
Dec 14, 1988		at Vanderbilt	L 77-93	4-1 (0-1)	Memorial Gymnasium; Nashville, TN
Dec 17, 1988*		Jackson State	W 74-51	5-1	Joel H. Eaves Memorial Coliseum; Auburn, AL
Dec 20, 1988*		at Virginia Commonwealth	W 85-79	6-1	Richmond Coliseum; Richmond, VA
Dec 28,1988*		vs. Villanova; Red Lobster Classic	L 83-84	6-2	Orange County Civic Center; Orlando, FL
Dec 29, 1988*		at Central Florida; Red Lobster Classic	W 95-68	7-2	Orange County Civic Center; Orlando, FL
Jan 4, 1989		No. 17 Tennessee	L 73-84	7-3 (0-2)	Joel H. Eaves Memorial Coliseum; Auburn, AL
*Non-conference game. ^{#}Rankings from AP Poll. (#) Tournament seedings in parentheses. SE=Southeast. All times are in Central.
