= 1989 Southland Conference men's basketball tournament =

- Classification: Division I
- Season: 1988–89
- Teams: 7
- First round site: Campus Sites; Campus Arenas
- Finals site: Super Pit; Denton, Texas
- Champions: McNeese State (1st title)
- Winning coach: Steve Welch (1st title)
- MVP: Michael Cutright (McNeese State)

1988–89 Southland Conference men's basketball standings
	Conf.				Overall
Team	W		L	PCT	W		L	PCT
North Texas State	10	–	4	.714	14	–	15	.483
NE Louisiana	9	–	5	.643	17	–	12	.586
McNeese State †	9	–	5	.643	16	–	14	.533
Sam Houston State	8	–	6	.571	12	–	16	.429
Northwestern State	7	–	7	.500	13	–	16	.448
Southwest Texas State	6	–	8	.429	13	–	17	.433
UT Arlington	4	–	10	.286	7	–	21	.250
Stephen F. Austin	3	–	11	.214	10	–	18	.357
† 1989 Southland Conference tournament winner

The 1989 Southland Conference men's basketball tournament was held March 4–6 at Super Pit in Denton, Texas.

McNeese State defeated North Texas in the championship game, 85–68, to win their first Southland men's basketball tournament.

The Cowboys received a bid to the 1989 NCAA Tournament as #16 seed in the Midwest region. They were the only Southland member invited to the NCAA tournament.

== Format ==
All six of the conference's members participated in the tournament field. They were seeded based on regular season conference records, with the top two teams earning byes into the semifinal round. The other four teams began play in the quarterfinal round.

First round games were played at the home court of the higher-seeded team. All remaining games were played at the Super Pit in Denton, Texas.

== Bracket ==
Quarterfinals; Tuesday, March 4
4	Northwestern State	82
5	Southwest Texas State	81
3	NE Louisiana	81
6	Texas-Arlington	75

Semifinals; Wednesday, March 5
1	North Texas State	100
4	Northwestern State	77
3	NE Louisiana	65
2	McNeese State	80

Championship; Thursday, March 6
1	North Texas State	68
2	McNeese State	85
