= 1988–89 McNeese State Cowboys basketball team =

American college basketball season

1988–89 McNeese State Cowboys basketball

Southland tournament champions

NCAA tournament
- Conference: Southland Conference
- Record: 16–14 (9–5 Southland)
- Head coach: Steve Welch
- Home arena: Burton Coliseum

1988–89 Southland Conference men's basketball standings
	Conf.				Overall
Team	W		L	PCT	W		L	PCT
North Texas State	10	–	4	.714	14	–	15	.483
NE Louisiana	9	–	5	.643	17	–	12	.586
McNeese State †	9	–	5	.643	16	–	14	.533
Sam Houston State	8	–	6	.571	12	–	16	.429
Northwestern State	7	–	7	.500	13	–	16	.448
Southwest Texas State	6	–	8	.429	13	–	17	.433
UT Arlington	4	–	10	.286	7	–	21	.250
Stephen F. Austin	3	–	11	.214	10	–	18	.357
† 1989 Southland Conference tournament winner

The 1988–89 McNeese State Cowboys basketball team represented the McNeese State University during the 1988–89 NCAA Division I men's basketball season. The Cowboys, led by head coach Steve Welch, played their home games at Burton Coliseum and were members of the Southland Conference. They finished the season with a record of 16–14, 9–5 in Southland play. They won the 1989 Southland Conference men's basketball tournament to earn an automatic bid in the 1989 NCAA Division I men's basketball tournament as No. 16 seed in the Midwest region. They lost in the first round to No. 1 seed Illinois, 77–71.

== Roster ==
1988–89 McNeese State Cowboys men's basketball team
Players	Coaches
Pos. / # / Name / Height / Weight / Year / Hometown; F / / Anthony Pullard / 6 ft 10 in (2.08 m) / 240 lb (109 kg) / Jr / DeQuincy, Louisiana	Head coach: Steve Welch; Assistant coach(es) Legend: (C) Team captain; (S) Suspended; (I) Ineligible; (W) Walk-on; Injured; Current redshirt

== Schedule and results ==
Date time, TV	Rank^{#}	Opponent^{#}	Result	Record	Site (attendance) city, state
Regular season
Nov 26, 1988*		at No. 7 Iowa	L 56–77	0–1	Carver-Hawkeye Arena; Iowa City, Iowa
Dec 8, 1988*		at LSU	L 89–91	3–3	Maravich Assembly Center; Baton Rouge, Louisiana
Jan 16, 1989*		Louisiana Tech	L 64–70	6–6	Burton Coliseum; Lake Charles, Louisiana
Feb 25, 1989		Texas State	W 67–57	13–13 (8–5)	Burton Coliseum; Lake Charles, Louisiana
Mar 2, 1989		at Stephen F. Austin	W 87–85	14–13 (9–5)	William R. Johnson Coliseum; Nacogdoches, Texas
Southland tournament
Mar 5, 1989*		vs. Northeast Louisiana	W 80–65	15–13	Super Pit; Denton, Texas
Mar 6, 1989*		at North Texas	W 85–68	16–13	Super Pit; Denton, Texas
NCAA tournament
Mar 16, 1989*	(16 MW)	vs. (1 MW) No. 3 Illinois	L 71–77	16–14	RCA Dome; Indianapolis, Indiana
*Non-conference game. ^{#}Rankings from AP Poll. (#) Tournament seedings in parentheses. MW=Midwest. All times are in Central Time.
