= 1989 MAAC men's basketball tournament =

- Classification: Division I
- Season: 1988–89
- Teams: 8
- First round site: Campus Sites; Campus Arenas
- Finals site: Meadowlands Arena; East Rutherford, NJ
- Champions: La Salle (2nd title)
- Winning coach: Speedy Morris (2nd title)
- MVP: Lionel Simmons (La Salle)

1988–89 MAAC men's basketball standings
	Conf.				Overall
Team	W		L	PCT	W		L	PCT
La Salle †	13	–	1	.929	26	–	6	.813
Saint Peter's	11	–	3	.786	22	–	9	.710
Iona	8	–	6	.571	15	–	16	.484
Fordham	8	–	6	.571	14	–	15	.483
Army	6	–	8	.429	12	–	16	.429
Holy Cross	5	–	9	.357	13	–	15	.464
Manhattan	3	–	11	.214	7	–	21	.250
Fairfield	2	–	12	.143	7	–	21	.250
† 1989 MAAC tournament winner

The 1989 MAAC men's basketball tournament was held March 2–3 at a combination of on-campus gymnasiums and the Meadowlands Arena in East Rutherford, New Jersey. This was the first edition of the tournament.

Top-seeded La Salle defeated St. Peter's in the championship game, 71–58, to win their second MAAC men's basketball tournament.

The Explorers received an automatic bid to the 1989 NCAA tournament as the #8 seed in the Southeast region.

== Format ==
All eight of the conference's members participated in the tournament field. They were seeded based on regular season conference records.

First Round games were played at the home court of the higher-seeded team. All remaining games were played at a neutral site at the Meadowlands Arena in East Rutherford, New Jersey.

== Bracket ==
Quarterfinals; Friday, March 2
1	La Salle	91
8	Fairfield	62
4	Fordham	77
5	Army	63
3	Iona	76
6	Holy Cross	63
2	Saint Peter's	76
7	Manhattan	63

Semifinals; Saturday, March 3
1	La Salle	85
4	Fordham	69
3	Iona	76
2	Saint Peter's	77

Championship; Sunday, March 4
1	La Salle	71
2	Saint Peter's	58
