= C. M. Newton =

American college basketball coach

Biographical details
- Born: February 2, 1930; Rockwood, Tennessee, U.S.
- Died: June 4, 2018 (aged 88); Tuscaloosa, Alabama, U.S.

Playing career

Basketball
- 1949–1951: Kentucky

Baseball
- 1950–1951: Kentucky
- Positions: Guard (basketball); Pitcher (baseball)

Coaching career (HC unless noted)

Basketball
- 1956–1968: Transylvania
- 1968–1980: Alabama
- 1981–1989: Vanderbilt

Administrative career (AD unless noted)
- 1989–2000: Kentucky

Head coaching record
- Overall: 509–375
- Tournaments: 3–4 (NCAA Division I); 12–8 (NIT)

Accomplishments and honors

Championships
- 3 SEC regular season (1974, 1975, 1976)

Awards
- 6× SEC Coach of the Year (1972, 1973, 1975, 1976, 1988, 1989)
- Basketball Hall of Fame; Inducted in 2000
- College Basketball Hall of Fame; Inducted in 2006

Charles Martin Newton (February 2, 1930 – June 4, 2018) was an American collegiate basketball player, coach, and athletics administrator. He served as the head men's basketball coach at Transylvania University from 1956 to 1968, the University of Alabama from 1968 to 1980, and Vanderbilt University from 1981 to 1989, compiling a career college basketball coaching record of 509–375. He was chairman of the NCAA Rules committee from 1979 to 1985 and was the president of USA Basketball from 1992 to 1996.

Newton played basketball and baseball at the University of Kentucky, where he was a member of the national championship-winning 1950–51 Kentucky Wildcats men's basketball team led by head coach Adolph Rupp. Newton returned to his alma mater in 1989 as athletic director, serving in that role until his retirement in 2000. He was enshrined in the Naismith Memorial Basketball Hall of Fame as a contributor in 2000 and was inducted into the College Basketball Hall of Fame in 2006. Former Kentucky coach Tubby Smith said of Newton: "I don't think there's been a better person in athletics than C.M. Newton. In all athletics, not just basketball. He had the utmost respect from people."

== College career ==
Born in Rockwood, Tennessee, Newton was a two-sport player at the University of Kentucky, playing both baseball and basketball. As a reserve guard/forward, he was part of the Wildcats' national championship team in 1951 under legendary coach Adolph Rupp, though Newton himself averaged only 1.2 points per game. As a pitcher he helped the Wildcats baseball team reach the NCAA tournament and, after college, signed a minor league baseball contract with a New York Yankees farm system. Newton finally gave up baseball after the births of his two daughters.

== Coaching career ==
Newton's coaching career spanned 30 years and three institutions.

=== Transylvania ===
By 1956, Newton had landed his first basketball coaching job at Transylvania University (then Transylvania College) in Lexington, Kentucky on a recommendation by Rupp. Newton compiled a 169–137 record at Transylvania, leading them to the 1963 NAIA Tournament. While at Transylvania he recruited the school's first black player.

Newton was inducted into Transylvania's Pioneer Hall of Fame in 1992.

=== Alabama ===
In 1968, legendary football coach and athletic director Paul "Bear" Bryant, who had been the coach for the University of Kentucky's football team during Newton's playing days, called Rupp looking for someone to turn around the University of Alabama's basketball program. Rupp recommended Newton, who after twelve seasons at Transylvania, left Lexington for Tuscaloosa.

In twelve seasons at Alabama, Newton led the Crimson Tide to a record of 211–123. Under Newton the Crimson Tide became the only school besides the University of Kentucky to win three straight Southeastern Conference titles (1974, 1975, and 1976). Newton also guided Alabama to four NIT and two NCAA tournament berths, prompting the school to name a recruiting suite in his honor in 2006.

Just as he did at Transylvania, Newton recruited Alabama's first black player, Wendell Hudson, in 1969, integrating his second team in as many coaching stops. In addition, Newton would start five black players in a time of racial turbulence and progress. Center Leon Douglas said, "We knew Coach Newton (signed us) because he wanted to win. He wasn't trying to be a trailblazer. You have to respect a man for putting five black starters on the court when others said it was a no-no." On December 28, 1973, in a 65–55 win at Louisville Cardinals men's basketball, Newton started Douglas, Charles "Boonie" Russell, Charles Cleveland, T.R. Dunn and Ray Odums for the first all-black starting line-up in SEC history, and a team that would win the SEC season title.

=== Vanderbilt ===
After resigning from the University of Alabama in 1980 to become assistant commissioner of the Southeastern Conference, Newton had no intentions of coaching again until he was approached by Roy Kramer, the athletics director for Vanderbilt University. After only one year as assistant commissioner, Newton became coach of the Vanderbilt Commodores, leading them to a 129–115 mark in eight seasons and berths in the NCAA tournament in 1988 and 1989.

== Administrative career ==
=== NCAA Rules Committee ===
From 1979 to 1985, Newton served as chair of the NCAA Rules Committee. During his tenure the NCAA adopted the shot clock, the three-point line, and the coaches' box. Newton was a member of the NCAA Division I Basketball Committee, overseeing the NCAA Tournament, from 1992 to 1999, including the last two years as chair of the group. In 1998, a survey done by the San Antonio Express-News proclaimed Newton "the most powerful man in college basketball." On March 16, 2015, former long-time commissioner of the Big East, Mike Tranghese, told Chris Russo on Sirius XM radio that Newton is the best chairman that ever served the NCAA.

=== University of Kentucky ===
In 1989, Newton's alma mater, the University of Kentucky, persuaded him to replace athletic director Cliff Hagan and help navigate the stormy waters of an NCAA probation. Newton's first move as AD was to hire then-New York Knicks coach Rick Pitino. Three years later, the Wildcats bounced back from their probation with a core of mostly Kentucky-born players known affectionately to fans as "The Unforgettables." The group—consisting of Sean Woods, Deron Feldhaus, Richie Farmer, and John Pelphrey—lost to Duke in overtime of the 1992 NCAA tournament East Regional final, a matchup many consider the greatest college basketball game ever played. Pitino would lead Kentucky to three Final Four appearances and the 1996 NCAA Championship before his departure in 1997.

Newton also hired Bernadette Mattox, the university's first black women's basketball coach in 1995. In 1997, he hired Orlando "Tubby" Smith, the university's first black men's basketball coach, to replace Pitino, who had accepted a head coaching job with the NBA's Boston Celtics. Smith led the Wildcats to the NCAA Championship in his first season.

On December 18, 1999, Newton was presented with the Annie Wittenmyer White Ribbon Award by the Women's Christian Temperance Union for refusing to allow alcohol advertising at university sporting events. Newton retired on June 30, 2000.

In 2000, the University of Kentucky officially named its football playing field at Commonwealth Stadium, "C. M. Newton Field". As part of the renaming of the stadium to "Kroger Field" in 2017, the field itself was renamed "C. M. Newton Grounds".

=== USA Basketball ===
From 1992 to 1996, Newton served as the president of USA Basketball. It was on Newton's watch that the decision was made to allow professional basketball players to represent the United States in the Summer Olympics. This decision gave rise to the 1992 "Dream Team".

Newton also served as an assistant coach under Bob Knight for the gold medal-winning 1984 United States men's Olympic basketball team.

== Personal life and death ==
Newton and his first wife Evelyn, who died in 2000, had three children. He died on June 4, 2018. At the time of his death, he was survived by his wife Nancy, whom he married in 2002.

Newton's son, Charles Martin (Martin) Newton Jr., is the current athletic director at Samford University in Birmingham, Alabama, a post he has held since 2011. After spending 26 years in marketing for Converse and Nike, Martin Newton was a member of the athletic support staff at his father's alma mater Kentucky, before returning to his own alma mater. As of 2022, Samford has produced 58 Southern Conference championships under Newton's leadership and ranks among the top of all Division I schools in student-athlete graduation rates. In addition, Martin Newton has followed in his father's footsteps and began a four-year term as a member of the NCAA Division I Basketball Committee on September 1, 2022.

== Head coaching record ==
Record table
Season	Team	Overall	Conference	Standing	Postseason
Transylvania Pioneers () (1956–1968)
Transylvania:		169–137 (.552)			
Alabama Crimson Tide (Southeastern Conference) (1968–1980)
1968–69	Alabama	4–20	1–17	10th	
1969–70	Alabama	8–18	5–13	9th	
1970–71	Alabama	10–16	6–12	T–8th	
1971–72	Alabama	18–8	13–5	3rd	
1972–73	Alabama	22–8	13–5	T–2nd	NIT Fourth Place
1973–74	Alabama	22–4	15–3	T–1st	
1974–75	Alabama	22–5	15–3	T–1st	NCAA Division I First Round
1975–76	Alabama	23–5	15–3	1st	NCAA Division I Second Round
1976–77	Alabama	25–6	14–4	3rd	NIT Fourth Place
1977–78	Alabama	17–10	11–7	4th	
1978–79	Alabama	22–11	11–7	T–3rd	NIT Third Place
1979–80	Alabama	18–12	12–6	T–3rd	NIT Second Round
Alabama:		211–123 (.632)	131–85 (.606)		
Vanderbilt Commodores (Southeastern Conference) (1981–1989)
1981–82	Vanderbilt	15–13	7–11	T–7th	
1982–83	Vanderbilt	19–14	9–9	T–4th	NIT Second Round
1983–84	Vanderbilt	14–15	8–10	T–7th	
1984–85	Vanderbilt	11–17	4–14	10th	
1985–86	Vanderbilt	13–15	7–11	7th	
1986–87	Vanderbilt	18–16	7–11	T–8th	NIT Quarterfinal
1987–88	Vanderbilt	20–11	10–8	T–4th	NCAA Division I Sweet 16
1988–89	Vanderbilt	19–14	12–6	T–2nd	NCAA Division I First Round
Vanderbilt:		129–115 (.529)	64–80 (.444)		
Total:		509–375 (.576)			
National champion Postseason invitational champion Conference regular season champion Conference regular season and conference tournament champion Division regular season champion Division regular season and conference tournament champion Conference tournament champion
