= 1988–89 La Salle Explorers men's basketball team =

American college basketball season

1988–89 La Salle Explorers men's basketball

MAAC regular season champion MAAC tournament champion

NCAA Division I tournament, first round
- Conference: Metro Atlantic Athletic Conference
- Record: 26–6 (13–1 MAAC)
- Head coach: Speedy Morris (3rd season)
- Assistant coaches: Joe Mihalich; Randy Monroe
- Home arena: The Palestra

1988–89 MAAC men's basketball standings
	Conf.				Overall
Team	W		L	PCT	W		L	PCT
La Salle †	13	–	1	.929	26	–	6	.813
Saint Peter's	11	–	3	.786	22	–	9	.710
Iona	8	–	6	.571	15	–	16	.484
Fordham	8	–	6	.571	14	–	15	.483
Army	6	–	8	.429	12	–	16	.429
Holy Cross	5	–	9	.357	13	–	15	.464
Manhattan	3	–	11	.214	7	–	21	.250
Fairfield	2	–	12	.143	7	–	21	.250
† 1989 MAAC tournament winner

The 1988–89 La Salle Explorers men's basketball team represented La Salle University during the 1988–89 NCAA Division I men's basketball season.

== Regular season ==
=== Player stats ===
Player	Games	Field Goals	Three Pointers	Free Throws	Rebounds	Blocks	Steals	Points
Lionel Simmons	32	349	21	189	365	61	55	908

== NCAA tournament ==
- Southeast
  - Louisiana Tech (#9 seed) 83, La Salle (#8 seed) 74

== Awards and honors ==
- Lionel Simmons, First Team All-Big 5 selection
- Lionel Simmons, Robert V. Geasey Trophy
- Lionel Simmons, Metro Atlantic Athletic Conference Player of the Year
