= 1988–89 Alabama Crimson Tide men's basketball team =

American college basketball season

1988–89 Alabama Crimson Tide men's basketball

SEC tournament champions

NCAA tournament, First round
- Conference: Southeastern Conference

Ranking
- Coaches: No. 20
- AP: No. 20
- Record: 23–8 (12–6 SEC)
- Head coach: Wimp Sanderson (9th season)
- Home arena: Coleman Coliseum

1988–89 Southeastern Conference men's basketball standings
	Conf.				Overall
Team	W		L	PCT	W		L	PCT
Florida	13	–	5	.722	21	–	13	.618
No. 20 Alabama †	12	–	6	.667	23	–	8	.742
Vanderbilt	12	–	6	.667	19	–	14	.576
LSU	11	–	7	.611	20	–	12	.625
Tennessee	11	–	7	.611	19	–	11	.633
Kentucky	8	–	10	.444	13	–	19	.406
Ole Miss	8	–	10	.444	15	–	15	.500
Mississippi State	7	–	11	.389	13	–	15	.464
Georgia	6	–	12	.333	15	–	16	.484
Auburn	2	–	16	.111	9	–	19	.321
† 1989 SEC tournament winner Rankings from AP poll

The 1988–89 Alabama Crimson Tide men's basketball team represented the University of Alabama in the 1988-89 NCAA Division I men's basketball season. The team's head coach was Wimp Sanderson, who was in his ninth season at Alabama. The team played their home games at Coleman Coliseum in Tuscaloosa, Alabama. They finished the season with a record of 23–8, 12–6 in conference, good for second behind Florida.

It was a strong off-season of signings for the Crimson Tide. Freshmen signees Marcus Webb and Robert Horry and junior college transfer David Benoit joined holdovers Keith Askins, Melvin Cheatum, Alvin Lee, and Michael Ansley.

The Tide won the 1989 SEC men's basketball tournament, beating Florida in the final and earning an automatic bid to the NCAA tournament. However, they were upset in the first round by South Alabama in the first ever meeting in history between the two Alabama-based schools.

== Roster ==
1988–89 Alabama Crimson Tide men's basketball team
Players
Coaches

Pos.	#	Name	Height	Weight	Year	Previous school	Hometown
F	45	Michael Ansley	6 ft 7 in (2.01 m)	—	Sr	Jackson-Olin High School	Birmingham, Alabama
G	44	Melvin Cheatum	6 ft 6 in (1.98 m)	—	So	Livingston High School	Livingston, Alabama
G	20	Alvin Lee	6 ft 1 in (1.85 m)	—	Sr	Jefferson-Huguenot-Wythe High School	Richmond, Virginia
G	12	Gary Waites	6 ft 2 in (1.88 m)	—	So	Decatur High School	Decatur, Georgia
F	30	David Benoit	6 ft 8 in (2.03 m)	—	Jr	Lafayette High School	Lafayette, Louisiana
G	22	Bryant Lancaster	6 ft 3 in (1.91 m)	—	Fr	Valley High School	Valley, Alabama
F	41	Keith Askins	6 ft 6 in (1.98 m)	—	So	Athens High School	Athens, Alabama
F	25	Robert Horry	6 ft 9 in (2.06 m)	—	Fr	Andalusia (AL) High School	Harford County, Maryland
G	14	James Sanders	6 ft 2 in (1.88 m)	—	Fr
F		Marcus Webb	6 ft 9 in (2.06 m)	—	Fr	Sidney Lanier High School	Montgomery, Alabama

Head coach

- Wimp Sanderson

Assistant coach(es)

Legend

- (C) Team captain
- (S) Suspended
- (I) Ineligible
- (W) Walk-on
- Injured
- Current redshirt

== Schedule and results ==
Date time, TV	Rank^{#}	Opponent^{#}	Result	Record	Site city, state
Regular Season
November 25, 1988*		Arizona State	W 84–83 ^{OT}	1–0	Richmond Coliseum; Richmond, Virginia
November 26, 1988*		at Richmond	W 54–49	2–0	Robins Center; Richmond, Virginia
December 2, 1988*		Oral Roberts	L 86–91	2–1	Jacksonville, Florida
December 3, 1988*		Southern Miss	W 63–58	3–1	Jacksonville, Florida
December 8, 1988*		Virginia Tech	W 79–76	4–1	Coleman Coliseum; Tuscaloosa, Alabama
December 12, 1988*		Augusta	W 94–78	5–1	Coleman Coliseum; Tuscaloosa, Alabama
December 17, 1988*		UCF	W 86–48	6–1	Coleman Coliseum; Tuscaloosa, Alabama
December 19, 1988*		Southern	W 102–87	7–1	Coleman Coliseum; Tuscaloosa, Alabama
December 22, 1988		at Georgia	L 60–65	7–2 (0–1)	Stegeman Coliseum; Athens, Georgia
December 29, 1988*		Louisiana-Monroe	W 80–65	8–2	Coleman Coliseum; Tuscaloosa, Alabama
January 4, 1989		at Vanderbilt	L 53–73	8–3 (0–2)	Memorial Gymnasium; Nashville, Tennessee
January 7, 1989		Ole Miss	W 79–67	9–3 (1–2)	Coleman Coliseum; Tuscaloosa, Alabama
January 11, 1989		Georgia	W 80–62	10–3 (2–2)	Coleman Coliseum; Tuscaloosa, Alabama
January 14, 1989		Mississippi State	W 97–80	11–3 (3–2)	Coleman Coliseum; Tuscaloosa, Alabama
January 18, 1989		Kentucky	W 76–64	12–3 (4–2)	Coleman Coliseum; Tuscaloosa, Alabama
January 21, 1989		at LSU	L 76–80	12–4 (4–3)	Maravich Assembly Center; Baton Rouge, Louisiana
January 25, 1989		Tennessee	W 87–85	13–4 (5–3)	Coleman Coliseum; Tuscaloosa, Alabama
January 28, 1989		at Auburn	W 67–64	14–4 (6–3)	Memorial Coliseum; Auburn, Alabama
February 1, 1989; 7:00 p.m., JPT		at Florida	L 76–85	14–5 (6–4)	O'Connell Center; Gainesville, Florida
February 4, 1989		Vanderbilt	W 77–67	15–5 (7–4)	Coleman Coliseum; Tuscaloosa, Alabama
February 8, 1989		at Ole Miss	W 55–54	16–5 (8–4)	Tad Smith Coliseum; Oxford, Mississippi
February 15, 1989		at Mississippi State	L 57–61	16–6 (8–5)	Humphrey Coliseum; Starkville, Mississippi
February 18, 1989		at Kentucky	W 71–67	17–6 (9–5)	Rupp Arena; Lexington, Kentucky
February 22, 1989		LSU	W 87–72	18–6 (10–5)	Coleman Coliseum; Tuscaloosa, Alabama
February 25, 1989		at Tennessee	L 69–84	18–7 (10–6)	Thompson-Boling Arena; Knoxville, Tennessee
March 2, 1989		Auburn	W 74–58	19–7 (11–6)	Coleman Coliseum; Tuscaloosa, Alabama
March 4, 1989		Florida	W 83–63	20–7 (12–6)	Coleman Coliseum; Tuscaloosa, Alabama
SEC Tournament
March 10, 1989; JPT	(2)	(7) Ole Miss; Second Round	W 64–56	21–7	Thompson-Boling Arena; Knoxville, Tennessee
March 11, 1989; JPT	(2)	(3) Vanderbilt; Semifinals	W 83–79	22–7	Thompson-Boling Arena; Knoxville, Tennessee
March 12, 1989; ABC	(2)	(1) Florida; SEC Championship	W 72–60	23–7	Thompson-Boling Arena; Knoxville, Tennessee
NCAA Tournament
March 17, 1989*	(6 SE) No. 20	(11 SE) South Alabama; First Round	L 84–86	23–8	The Omni; Atlanta, Georgia
*Non-conference game. ^{#}Rankings from AP poll. (#) Tournament seedings in parentheses. SE=Southeast.
