= 1988–89 LSU Tigers basketball team =

American college basketball season

1988–89 LSU Tigers basketball

NCAA tournament, first round
- Conference: Southeast Conference
- West Division
- Record: 20–12 (11–7 SEC)
- Head coach: Dale Brown (17th season)
- Assistant coaches: Ron Abernathy (13th season); Bo Bahnsen; Johnny Jones (5th season)
- Home arena: Pete Maravich Assembly Center

1988–89 Southeastern Conference men's basketball standings
	Conf.				Overall
Team	W		L	PCT	W		L	PCT
Florida	13	–	5	.722	21	–	13	.618
No. 20 Alabama †	12	–	6	.667	23	–	8	.742
Vanderbilt	12	–	6	.667	19	–	14	.576
LSU	11	–	7	.611	20	–	12	.625
Tennessee	11	–	7	.611	19	–	11	.633
Kentucky	8	–	10	.444	13	–	19	.406
Ole Miss	8	–	10	.444	15	–	15	.500
Mississippi State	7	–	11	.389	13	–	15	.464
Georgia	6	–	12	.333	15	–	16	.484
Auburn	2	–	16	.111	9	–	19	.321
† 1989 SEC tournament winner Rankings from AP poll

The 1988–89 LSU Tigers men's basketball team represented Louisiana State University during the 1988–89 NCAA men's college basketball season. The head coach was Dale Brown. The team was a member of the Southeastern Conference and played their home games at Pete Maravich Assembly Center.

== Roster ==
1988–89 LSU Tigers men's basketball team
Players
Coaches

Pos.	#	Name	Height	Weight	Year	Previous school	Hometown
F/C	33	Ricky Blanton	6 ft 7 in (2.01 m)	215 lb (98 kg)	Sr	Miami Killian	Miami, FL
F/C	32	Harold Boudreaux (I)	6 ft 9 in (2.06 m)	250 lb (113 kg)	Fr	Cecilia	Cecilia, LA
G	35	Chris Jackson	6 ft 1 in (1.85 m)	160 lb (73 kg)	Fr	Gulfport	Gulfport, MS
F	21	Lyle Mouton	6 ft 4 in (1.93 m)	240 lb (109 kg)	So	St. Thomas More	Lafayette, LA
C	53	Stanley Roberts (I)	7 ft 0 in (2.13 m)	285 lb (129 kg)	Fr	Lower Richland	Hopkins, SC
F	44	Wayne Sims	6 ft 7 in (2.01 m)	—	So	DeRidder	DeRidder, LA
F	24	Vernel Singleton	6 ft 7 in (2.01 m)	210 lb (95 kg)	Fr		Natchez, MS
G	13	Dennis Tracey (W)	6 ft 4 in (1.93 m)	180 lb (82 kg)	Fr	De La Salle	New Orleans, LA

Head coach

- Dale Brown (Minot State)

Assistant coach(es)

- Ron Abernathy (Morehead State)
- Craig Carse
- Jim Childers
- Johnny Jones (LSU)

Legend

- (C) Team captain
- (S) Suspended
- (I) Ineligible
- (W) Walk-on
- Injured
- Current redshirt

== Schedule and results ==
Date time, TV	Rank^{#}	Opponent^{#}	Result	Record	Site city, state
Regular season
Nov 25, 1988*		Marist	W 94–58	1–0	Maravich Assembly Center; Baton Rouge, LA
Nov 30, 1988*		Oral Roberts	L 96–100	1–1	Maravich Assembly Center; Baton Rouge, LA
Dec 6, 1988*		Louisiana Tech	L 109–111	1–2	Maravich Assembly Center; Baton Rouge, LA
Dec 8, 1988*		McNeese State	W 91–89	2–2	Maravich Assembly Center; Baton Rouge, LA
Dec 10, 1988		at Florida	W 111–101	3–2 (1–0)	Stephen C. O'Connell Center; Gainesville, FL
Dec 8, 1988*		UT Martin	W 128–89	4–2	Maravich Assembly Center; Baton Rouge, LA
Dec 22, 1988*		No. 5 Illinois	L 100–127	4–3	Maravich Assembly Center (14,192); Baton Rouge, LA
Dec 28, 1988*		vs. Morehead State; Chaminade Classic	W 101–88	5–3	Honolulu, HI
Dec 29, 1988*		at Chaminade; Chaminade Classic	W 94–79	6–3	Honolulu, HI
Dec 30, 1988*		vs. Nebraska; Chaminade Classic	W 90–87	7–3	Honolulu, HI
Jan 2, 1989*		at Maryland	W 79–77	8–3	Cole Fieldhouse; College Park, MD
Jan 4, 1989		Mississippi State	L 84–87	8–4 (1–1)	Maravich Assembly Center; Baton Rouge, LA
Jan 7, 1989		Auburn	W 104–77	9–4 (2–1)	Maravich Assembly Center; Baton Rouge, LA
Jan 11, 1989		at No. 17 Tennessee	L 96–100	9–5 (2–2)	Thompson-Boling Arena; Knoxville, TN
Jan 14, 1989		at Kentucky	W 64–62	10–5 (3–2)	Rupp Arena; Lexington, KY
Jan 18, 1989; 7:00 p.m., JPT		Vanderbilt	W 86–85	11–5 (4–2)	Maravich Assembly Center; Baton Rouge, LA
Jan 21, 1989		Alabama	W 80–76	12–5 (5–2)	Maravich Assembly Center; Baton Rouge, LA
Jan 25, 1989		at Georgia	W 80–79	13–5 (6–2)	Stegeman Coliseum; Athens, GA
Jan 28, 1989*; CBS		vs. No. 2 Georgetown	W 82–80	14–5	Louisiana Superdome (54,321); New Orleans, LA
Feb 1, 1989	No. 19	Ole Miss	W 105–75	15–5 (7–2)	Maravich Assembly Center; Baton Rouge, LA
Feb 4, 1989	No. 19	at Mississippi State	L 79–96	15–6 (7–3)	Humphrey Coliseum; Starkville, MS
Feb 8, 1989		at Auburn	W 104–91	16–6 (8–3)	Beard–Eaves–Memorial Coliseum; Auburn, AL
Feb 11, 1989; JPT		Tennessee	W 122–106	17–6 (9–3)	Maravich Assembly Center; Baton Rouge, LA
Feb 15, 1989; 7:00 p.m., JPT	No. 20	Kentucky	W 99–80	18–6 (10–3)	Maravich Assembly Center; Baton Rouge, LA
Feb 18, 1989; JPT	No. 20	at Vanderbilt	L 74–108	18–7 (10–4)	Memorial Gymnasium; Nashville, TN
Feb 20, 1989		Georgia	W 97–83	19–7 (11–4)	Maravich Assembly Center; Baton Rouge, LA
Feb 22, 1989; 7:00 p.m., JPT		at Alabama	L 72–87	19–8 (11–5)	Coleman Coliseum; Tuscaloosa, AL
Feb 25, 1989*; CBS		No. 18 UNLV	W 88–87	20–8	Maravich Assembly Center; Baton Rouge, LA
Mar 1, 1989; 7:00 p.m., JPT		Florida	L 95–104	20–9 (11–6)	Maravich Assembly Center; Baton Rouge, LA
Mar 4, 1989; TigerVision		at Ole Miss	L 112–113	20–10 (11–7)	C.M. "Tad" Smith Coliseum; Oxford, MS
SEC Tournament
Mar 10, 1989*; JPT		at Tennessee; SEC Tournament Quarterfinal	L 77–95	20–11	Thompson-Boling Arena; Knoxville, TN
NCAA Tournament
Mar 17, 1989*	(7 W)	vs. (10 W) UTEP; First Round	L 74–85	20–12	McKale Center; Tucson, AZ
*Non-conference game. ^{#}Rankings from AP Poll. (#) Tournament seedings in parentheses. W=West.

== Awards and honors ==
- Chris Jackson – SEC Player of the Year, Consensus First-team All-American
- Dale Brown – SEC Coach of the Year
