= Clifford Lett =

American basketball player

Personal information
- Born: December 23, 1965 (age 60) Pensacola, Florida
- Listed height: 6 ft 3 in (1.91 m)
- Listed weight: 170 lb (77 kg)

Career information
- High school: Pensacola (Pensacola, Florida)
- College: Florida (1985–1989)
- NBA draft: 1989: undrafted
- Playing career: 1989–1997
- Position: Point guard
- Number: 11

Career history
- 1989–1991: Pensacola Tornados
- 1990: Chicago Bulls
- 1991: San Antonio Spurs
- 1992–1993: Sioux Falls Skyforce
- 1993–1994: Columbus Horizon
- 1994–1995: Rockford Lightning
- 1997: Jacksonville Barracudas

Career highlights
- CBA All-Defensive Team (1990); CBA Rookie of the Year (1990); CBA All-Rookie Team (1990)
- Stats at NBA.com
- Stats at Basketball Reference

Clifford Earl Lett (born December 23, 1965) is a retired American professional basketball player. Born in Pensacola, Florida, he played briefly in the NBA in the early 1990s, and played as a 6-foot-3-inch (1.91 m) and 170-pound (77 kg) guard.

Lett attended the University of Florida and was signed in March 1990 by the Chicago Bulls to a 10-day contract, and then to a second in April. After he scored 4 points in as many games played with the team, he was not retained. His short NBA career lasted 7 more games in 1990–91 when he signed with the San Antonio Spurs on a 10-day contract in February 1991, but was waived after 20 days.

Lett played in the Continental Basketball Association (CBA) for the Pensacola Tornados, Sioux Falls Skyforce, Columbus Horizon and Rockford Lightning from 1989 to 1995. He was selected as the CBA Rookie of the Year and named to the All-Defensive and All-Rookie Teams in 1990.

Lett played for the Jacksonville Barracudas of the United States Basketball League (USBL) during the 1997 season.
