= Tom Chapman (basketball) =

American basketball coach

Biographical details
- Born: October 11, 1948 (age 78)
- Education: University of Bridgeport (B.A.); Iona College (M.A.); St. Bonaventure University (M.A.); Nova Southeastern University (Ed.D)

Coaching career (HC unless noted)
- 1975–1978: Tuckahoe HS
- 1978–1984: Upsala College
- 1984–1989: Gannon
- 1989–1992: St. Bonaventure

Head coaching record
- Overall: 22–62 (.262) (Division I); 120–38 (.759) (Division II); 138–31 (.817) (Division III); 60–9 (.870) (High school)
- Tournaments: 7–7 (.500) (Division II); 12–7 (.632) (Division III)

Thomas Chapman (born October 11, 1948) is an American basketball coach and school administrator who was the head coach at Upsala College (1978–1984), Gannon College (1984–1989), and St. Bonaventure University (1989–1992).

== Coaching ==
From 1975 to 1978, Chapman compiled a 60–9 record as head coach at Tuckahoe High School in Eastchester, New York. In 1978, he succeeded Richie Adubato as head coach at Upsala College after Adubato became an assistant with the Detroit Pistons. The Vikings appeared in the NCAA Division III men's basketball tournament in each of Chapman's six seasons as head coach. They made it to the finals of the 1980 NCAA Division III basketball tournament, but lost to North Park University. Following a Final Four appearance in 1984, Chapman resigned to accept the head coaching job at NCAA Division II Gannon College. He led the Golden Knights to a 120–38 record over five seasons, which was the fourth-best record in Division II during that time. They made it to the finals of the 1987 NCAA Division II men's basketball tournament, but lost to Kentucky Wesleyan 92–74. Chapman then moved to NCAA Division I as the head coach of the St. Bonaventure Bonnies men's basketball team. Over three seasons, he amassed a 22–62 record, including a 6–46 record in Atlantic 10 Conference play. He was fired on July 24, 1992.

== School administration ==
After his coaching career ended, Chapman worked as a public school administrator. He was assistant principal in the Wyoming Area School District and principal of Pocono Mountain Senior High School. In 2002, he was promoted to assistant superintendent of the Pocono Mountain School District. From 2005 to 2019, he was superintendent of the Reading School District.
