= Anthony Manuel =

American basketball player

Personal information
- Listed height: 5 ft 11 in (1.80 m)

Career information
- High school: Crane (Chicago, Illinois)
- College: Bradley (1985–1989)
- NBA draft: 1989: undrafted
- Position: Point guard

Career highlights
- MVC Player of the Year (1989); First-team All-MVC (1989); 2× Second-team All-MVC (1987, 1988)

Anthony Manuel is an American former basketball player. He grew up in Chicago, Illinois and played basketball at Crane High School. He then played for Bradley University from 1985 to 1989 and holds school records for most assists in a season (373 in 1987–88) and in a career (855). He was the Missouri Valley Conference Men's Basketball Player of the Year in 1989.

== See also ==
- List of NCAA Division I men's basketball players with 20 or more assists in a game
