= Coleman Crawford =

American basketball player and coach (born 1953)

Biographical details
- Born: October 2, 1953 (age 73)

Playing career
- 1971–1973: Seward County CC
- 1973–1975: North Alabama

Coaching career (HC unless noted)
- 1983–1986: Akron (assistant)
- 1986–1989: Tennessee (assistant)
- 1989–1995: Akron
- 1995–1997: Tulsa (assistant)
- 1997–2002: Florida State (assistant)
- 2002–2004: SMU (assistant)
- 2005–2006: Fort Worth Flyers (assistant)

Head coaching record
- Overall: 71–91

Coleman Crawford (born October 2, 1953) is a former college basketball head coach. He coached the Akron Zips men's basketball team from 1989 to 1995. In six seasons, he guided the Zips to a 71–91 record.
