= Henry Wilson (basketball) =

American basketball player

Personal information
- Born: 1960s
- Listed height: 6 ft 7 in (2.01 m)

Career information
- College: Campbell (1985–1989)
- NBA draft: 1989: undrafted
- Position: Center

Career highlights
- Big South Player of the Year (1989); 3× First-team All-Big South (1987–1989)

Henry Wilson (born 1960s) is an American former basketball player best known for his collegiate career at Campbell University between 1985–86 and 1988–89. During his four-year tenure playing for the Fighting Camels, Wilson a 6'7" center, was a three-time First Team All-Big South Conference selection from his sophomore through senior seasons as well as a two-time All-Big South tournament selection in 1987 and 1989. During his senior campaign in 1988–89, Wilson was named the Big South Player of the Year, becoming the fourth overall recipient of that award and the second player from Campbell in its then-brief history.

For his career, Henry compiled 1,604 points, 724 rebounds and a school record 156 blocked shots. At the time of his graduation he also held the school record for career games started with 107 (since surpassed).
