= 1988–89 NCAA Division I men's basketball rankings =

- Season: 1988–89
- NCAA Tournament: 1989
- Preseason No. 1: Duke
- NCAA Tournament Champions: Michigan
NCAA Division I men's basketball rankings


The 1988–89 NCAA Division I men's basketball rankings was made up of two human polls, the AP Poll and the Coaches Poll, in addition to various other preseason polls.

== Legend ==
	Increase in ranking
	Decrease in ranking
	New to rankings from previous week
Italics	Number of first place votes
(#–#)	Win–loss record
т	Tied with team above or below also with this symbol

== AP Poll ==
	Preseason Pre	Week 2 Nov. 22	Week 3 Nov. 29	Week 4 Dec. 6	Week 5 Dec. 13	Week 6 Dec. 20	Week 7 Dec. 27	Week 8 Jan. 3	Week 9 Jan. 10	Week 10 Jan. 17	Week 11 Jan. 24	Week 12 Jan. 31	Week 13 Feb. 7	Week 14 Feb. 14	Week 15 Feb. 21	Week 16 Feb. 28	Week 17 Mar. 7	Final Mar. 14	
1.	Duke	Duke (1–0)	Duke (2–0)	Duke (4–0)	Duke (6–0)	Duke (6–0)	Duke (7–0)	Duke (8–0)	Duke (11–0)	Duke (13–0)	Illinois (17–0)	Oklahoma (17–2)	Arizona (17–2)	Oklahoma (21–3)	Oklahoma (23–3)	Arizona (22–3)	Arizona (24–3)	Arizona (27–3)	1.
2.	Georgetown	Georgetown (0–0)	Michigan (3–0)	Michigan (5–0)	Michigan (8–0)	Michigan (9–0)	Michigan (11–0)	Syracuse (13–0)	Illinois (13–0)	Illinois (15–0)	Georgetown (14–1)	Illinois (18–1)	Georgetown (17–2)	Arizona (18–3)	Arizona (20–3)	Georgetown (22–3)	Oklahoma (26–4)	Georgetown (26–4)	2.
3.	Michigan	Michigan (0–0)	Georgetown (2–0)	Syracuse (7–0)	Syracuse (8–0)	Syracuse (10–0)	Syracuse (11–0)	Illinois (12–0)	Oklahoma (12–1)	Georgetown (12–1)	Louisville (13–2)	North Carolina (18–3)	Missouri (20–3)	Missouri (21–4)	Georgetown (20–3)	Indiana (23–5)	Georgetown (23–4)	Illinois (27–4)	3.
4.	Louisville	Oklahoma (0–0)	Syracuse (4–0)	Georgetown (2–0)	Iowa (6–0)	Iowa (8–0)	Illinois (9–0)	Oklahoma (10–1)	Syracuse (14–1)	Louisville (12–2)	Oklahoma (15–2)	Arizona (15–2)	Louisville (16–3)	Georgetown (18–3)	Indiana (21–5)	Oklahoma (24–4)	Illinois (25–4)	Oklahoma (28–5)	4.
5.	Oklahoma	North Carolina (2–0)	Oklahoma (2–1)	Iowa (4–0)	Georgetown (4–0)	Illinois (7–0)	Georgetown (7–0)	Georgetown (9–0)	Iowa (13–1)	Oklahoma (13–2)	Missouri (16–3)	Missouri (18–3)	Oklahoma (18–3)	Illinois (20–3)	North Carolina (22–5)	North Carolina (24–5)	Syracuse (25–6)	North Carolina (27–7)	5.
6.	North Carolina	Syracuse (0–0)	Iowa (1–0)	Oklahoma (2–1)	Illinois (6–0)	Georgetown (6–0)	Oklahoma (8–1)	North Carolina (11–1)	Michigan (13–1)	Michigan (14–2)	Arizona (13–2)	Georgetown (15–2)	North Carolina (18–4)	Syracuse (21–4)	Syracuse (22–5)	Syracuse (23–5)	Indiana (24–6)	Missouri (27–7)	6.
7.	Iowa	Iowa (0–0)	Illinois (1–0)	Illinois (3–0)	Oklahoma (5–1)	Oklahoma (6–1)	North Carolina (10–1)	Michigan (12–1)	Georgetown (10–1)	Iowa (13–2)	North Carolina (16–3)	Louisville (14–3)	Illinois (18–3)	Florida State (19–2)	Missouri (22–5)	Missouri (23–6)	Duke (22–6)	Syracuse (27–7)	7.
8.	Syracuse	UNLV (0–0)	Missouri (3–1)	North Carolina (6–1)	North Carolina (8–1)	North Carolina (9–1)	Arizona (6–1)	Arizona (8–1)	North Carolina (13–2)	Missouri (13–3)	Duke (13–2)	Florida State (16–1)	Iowa (17–4)	North Carolina (19–5)	Louisville (18–5)	Illinois (23–4)	Michigan (23–6)	Indiana (25–7)	8.
9.	Illinois	Illinois (0–0)	UNLV (2–1)	UNLV (2–1)	Arizona (3–1)	Arizona (4–1)	Iowa (10–1)	Iowa (11–1)	Louisville (9–2)	Arizona (11–2)	Seton Hall (17–1)	Iowa (15–3)	Syracuse (19–4)	Indiana (20–5)	Duke (19–4)	Duke (21–5)	North Carolina (24–7)	Duke (24–7)	9.
10.	UNLV	Arizona (0–0)	North Carolina (3–1)	Arizona (2–1)	Missouri (7–2)	Missouri (9–2)	Florida State (7–0)	Seton Hall (12–0)	Missouri (13–3)	UNLV (11–2)	Michigan (15–3)	Seton Hall (18–2)	Michigan (17–4)	Louisville (17–5)	Illinois (21–4)	Michigan (21–6)	Missouri (24–7)	Michigan (24–7)	10.
11.	Arizona	Villanova (0–0)	Arizona (0–0)	Missouri (5–2)	Georgia Tech (4–0)	Florida State (6–0)	Missouri (10–3)	Missouri (12–3)	UNLV (9–2)	Syracuse (14–3)	Florida State (14–1)	Michigan (16–4)	Seton Hall (19–3)	Duke (17–4)	West Virginia (22–2)	Iowa (21–6)	Seton Hall (25–5)	Seton Hall (26–6)	11.
12.	Villanova	Louisville (0–1)	Georgia Tech (1–0)	Georgia Tech (3–0)	Florida State (4–0)	Ohio State (6–1)	UNLV (5–2)	UNLV (7–2)	Arizona (9–2)	Seton Hall (15–1)	Iowa (14–3)	Duke (14–3)	Florida State (17–2)	Seton Hall (20–4)	Florida State (19–4)	Seton Hall (23–5)	Stanford (24–5)	Louisville (22–8)	12.
13.	Georgia Tech	Missouri (2–0)	Louisville (0–1)	Florida State (3–0)	UNLV (2–2)	UNLV (3–2)	Seton Hall (10–0)	Louisville (7–2)	Seton Hall (13–1)	North Carolina (14–3)	UNLV (13–3)	NC State (14–2)	Indiana (18–5)	Michigan (18–5)	Michigan (19–6)	Stanford (23–5)	West Virginia (25–3)	Stanford (26–6)	13.
14.	Missouri	Georgia Tech (0–0)	Florida State (1–0)	Ohio State (3–1)	Ohio State (4–1)	Louisville (5–2)	Louisville (6–2)	Ohio State (9–2)	Florida State (10–1)	Florida State (12–1)	Syracuse (15–4)	Syracuse (17–4)	Duke (15–4)	West Virginia (19–2)	Iowa (19–6)	Louisville (19–7)	Florida State (21–6)	Iowa (22–9)	14.
15.	Florida	Florida (0–0)	Ohio State (2–1)	Louisville (1–2)	Louisville (4–2)	Seton Hall (9–0)	Ohio State (7–2)	Florida State (8–1)	NC State (9–1)	NC State (11–1)	NC State (12–2)	Ohio State (15–4)	West Virginia (17–2)	Iowa (17–6)	Seton Hall (21–5)	West Virginia (23–3)	Iowa (21–8)	UNLV (26–7)	15.
16.	Florida State	Ohio State (0–0)	NC State (1–0)	Tennessee (3–0)	Tennessee (4–0)	Georgia Tech (4–1)	South Carolina (6–0)	Tennessee (8–1) т	Kansas (12–1)	Ohio State (12–3)	Indiana (15–4)	UNLV (14–4)	Ohio State (15–5)	Ohio State (17–6)	Stanford (20–5)	Florida State (19–6)	Louisville (20–8)	Florida State (22–7)	16.
17.	Ohio State	Florida State (0–0)	Temple (0–0)	Villanova (3–1)	Seton Hall (7–0)	NC State (2–1)	Georgia Tech (5–1)	NC State (6–1) т	Tennessee (10–1)	Kansas (14–2)	Ohio State (12–4)	Indiana (16–5)	NC State (14–4)	Stanford (19–5)	NC State (17–5)	Saint Mary's (24–3)	NC State (20–7)	West Virginia (25–4)	17.
18.	NC State	NC State (0–0)	Villanova (1–1)	Connecticut (2–0)	NC State (2–1)	South Carolina (5–0)	NC State (4–1)	Kansas (10–1)	Ohio State (10–3)	Tennessee (11–2)	Kansas (15–3)	West Virginia (15–2)	Stanford (17–5)	UNLV (16–6)	UNLV (18–6)	UNLV (20–7)	UNLV (23–7)	Ball State (28–2)	18.
19.	Temple	Temple (0–0)	Florida (1–1)	NC State (2–1)	Notre Dame (4–0)	Tennessee (4–1)	Tennessee (6–1)	Georgia Tech (7–2)	Georgia Tech (10–2)	Indiana (13–4)	Stanford (14–4)	LSU (14–5)	UNLV (14–5)	NC State (15–5)	Saint Mary's (22–3)	Ball State (23–2)	Ball State (25–2)	NC State (20–8)	19.
20.	Stanford	Indiana (2–0)	Tennessee (1–0)	Seton Hall (5–0)	UCLA (4–0)	Kansas (7–1)	Kansas (8–1)	Georgia (9–2)	Providence (12–0)	Stanford (12–3)	Providence (14–2)	Stanford (15–5)	Georgia Tech (14–6)	LSU (17–6)	Ball State (21–2)	NC State (18–7)	Saint Mary's (25–4)	Alabama (23–7)	20.
	Preseason Pre	Week 2 Nov. 22	Week 3 Nov. 29	Week 4 Dec. 6	Week 5 Dec. 13	Week 6 Dec. 20	Week 7 Dec. 27	Week 8 Jan. 3	Week 9 Jan. 10	Week 10 Jan. 17	Week 11 Jan. 24	Week 12 Jan. 31	Week 13 Feb. 7	Week 14 Feb. 14	Week 15 Feb. 21	Week 16 Feb. 28	Week 17 Mar. 7	Final Mar. 14	
		Dropped: Stanford (1–1)	Dropped: Indiana (2–2)	Dropped: Temple (0–2); Florida (3–2)	Dropped: Villanova (3–3); Connecticut (4–1)	Dropped: Notre Dame (4–1); UCLA (4–1)	None	Dropped: South Carolina (6–2)	Dropped: Georgia (9–4)	Dropped: Georgia Tech (10–4); Providence (13–1)	Dropped: Tennessee (12–3)	Dropped: Kansas (16–4); Providence (15–3)	Dropped: LSU (15–6)	Dropped: Georgia Tech (14–7)	Dropped: Ohio State (17–8); LSU (18–7)	None	None	Dropped: Saint Mary's (25–4)	

== Coaches Poll ==
	Preseason	Week 2 Nov. 28	Week 3 Dec. 5	Week 4 Dec. 12	Week 5 Dec. 19	Week 6 Dec. 26	Week 7 Jan. 2	Week 8 Jan. 9	Week 9 Jan. 16	Week 10 Jan. 23	Week 11 Jan. 30	Week 12 Feb. 6	Week 13 Feb. 13	Week 14 Feb. 20	Week 15 Feb. 27	Week 16 Mar. 6	Final Mar. 13	
1.	Duke	Duke (2–0)	Duke (4–0)	Duke (6–0)	Duke (6–0)	Duke (7–0)	Duke (8–0)	Duke (11–0)	Duke (13–0)	Illinois (17–0)	Oklahoma (17–2)	Arizona (17–2)	Oklahoma (21–3)	Oklahoma (23–3)	Arizona (22–3)	Arizona (24–3)	Arizona (27–3)	1.
2.	Michigan	Michigan (3–0)	Michigan (5–0)	Michigan (8–0)	Michigan (9–0)	Michigan (11–0)	Syracuse (13–0)	Illinois (13–0)	Illinois (15–0)	Georgetown (14–1)	Illinois (18–1)	Georgetown (17–2)	Arizona (18–3)	Arizona (20–3)	Georgetown (22–3)	Oklahoma (26–4)	Georgetown (26–4)	2.
3.	North Carolina	Syracuse (4–0)	Syracuse (7–0)	Syracuse (8–0)	Syracuse (10–0)	Syracuse (11–0)	Illinois (12–0)	Oklahoma (12–1)	Louisville (12–2)	Louisville (13–2)	Arizona (15–2) т	Missouri (20–3)	Missouri (21–4)	Georgetown (20–3)	Indiana (23–5)	Georgetown (23–4)	Illinois (27–4)	3.
4.	Georgetown	Georgetown (2–0)	Georgetown (2–0)	Georgetown (4–0)	Iowa (8–0)	Illinois (9–0)	North Carolina (11–1)	Syracuse (14–1)	Georgetown (12–1)	Oklahoma (15–2)	North Carolina (18–3) т	Louisville (16–3)	Georgetown (18–3)	North Carolina (22–5)	Oklahoma (24–4)	Syracuse (25–6)	North Carolina (27–7)	4.
5.	Illinois	Oklahoma (2–1)	North Carolina (6–1)	Iowa (6–0)	Illinois (7–0)	North Carolina (10–1)	Georgetown (9–0)	Michigan (12–1)	Michigan (14–2)	Arizona (13–2)	Georgetown (15–2)	Oklahoma (18–3)	Syracuse (21–4)	Syracuse (22–5)	North Carolina (24–5)	Illinois (25–4)	Oklahoma (28–5)	5.
6.	Oklahoma	Illinois (1–0)	Iowa (4–0)	Illinois (6–0)	Georgetown (6–0)	Georgetown (7–0)	Oklahoma (10–1)	Iowa (13–1)	Oklahoma (13–2)	North Carolina (16–3)	Missouri (18–3)	North Carolina (18–4)	Illinois (20–3)	Indiana (21–5)	Syracuse (23–5)	Indiana (24–6)	Indiana (25–7)	6.
7.	UNLV	Iowa (1–0)	Oklahoma (2–1)	Oklahoma (5–1)	North Carolina (9–1)	Oklahoma (8–1)	Michigan (12–1) т	Georgetown (10–1)	Arizona (11–2)	Duke (13–2)	Louisville (14–3)	Illinois (18–3)	North Carolina (19–5)	Missouri (22–5)	Missouri (23–6)	Duke (22–6)	Duke (24–7)	7.
8.	Syracuse	UNLV (2–1)	UNLV (2–1)	North Carolina (8–1)	Oklahoma (6–1)	Arizona (6–1)	Arizona (8–1) т	North Carolina (13–2)	Iowa (13–2) т	Missouri (16–3)	Seton Hall (18–2)	Seton Hall (19–3)	Indiana (20–5)	Duke (19–4)	Duke (21–5)	North Carolina (24–7)	Missouri (27–7)	8.
9.	Iowa	Arizona (0–0)	Illinois (3–0)	Arizona (3–1)	Arizona (4–1)	Iowa (10–1)	Iowa (11–1)	Louisville (9–2)	Missouri (13–3) т	Seton Hall (17–1)	Florida State (16–1)	Michigan (17–4)	Florida State (19–2)	Louisville (18–5)	Illinois (23–4)	Michigan (23–6)	Syracuse (27–7)	9.
10.	Louisville	North Carolina (3–1)	Arizona (2–1)	Missouri (7–2)	Missouri (9–2)	UNLV (5–2)	Seton Hall (12–0)	Arizona (9–2)	UNLV (11–2)	Michigan (15–3)	Duke (14–3)	Syracuse (19–4)	Louisville (17–5)	Illinois (21–4)	Michigan (21–6)	Missouri (24–7)	Michigan (24–7)	10.
11.	Arizona	Missouri (3–1)	Missouri (5–2)	Georgia Tech (4–0)	Florida State (6–0)	Missouri (10–3)	Louisville (7–2)	UNLV (9–2)	Syracuse (14–3)	Florida State (14–1)	Michigan (16–4)	Iowa (17–4)	Seton Hall (20–4)	West Virginia (22–2)	Iowa (21–6)	Seton Hall (25–5)	Seton Hall (26–6)	11.
12.	Villanova	Georgia Tech (1–0)	Georgia Tech (3–0)	Florida State (4–0)	Ohio State (6–1)	Florida State (7–0)	UNLV (7–2)	Missouri (13–3)	North Carolina (14–3)	Iowa (14–3)	NC State (14–2)	Indiana (18–5)	Duke (17–4)	Florida State (19–4)	Seton Hall (23–5)	Stanford (24–5)	Stanford (26–6)	12.
13.	Missouri	Temple (0–0)	Florida State (3–0)	UNLV (2–2)	Seton Hall (9–0)	Seton Hall (10–0)	Missouri (10–3)	Seton Hall (13–1)	Seton Hall (15–1)	Syracuse (15–4)	Iowa (15–3)	Florida State (17–2)	Michigan (18–5)	Michigan (19–6)	Stanford (23–5)	NC State (20–7)	Louisville (22–8)	13.
14.	Florida	Florida State (1–0)	Louisville (1–2)	Ohio State (4–1)	UNLV (3–2)	Louisville (6–2)	Ohio State (9–2)	Florida State (10–1)	Florida State (12–1)	Indiana (15–4)	Syracuse (17–4)	Duke (15–4)	West Virginia (19–2)	Seton Hall (21–5)	Louisville (19–7)	West Virginia (25–3)	UNLV (26–7)	14.
15.	Temple	Ohio State (2–1)	Ohio State (3–1)	Seton Hall (7–0)	Louisville (5–2)	Ohio State (7–2)	Florida State (8–1)	Ohio State (10–3)	NC State (11–1)	NC State (12–2)	Ohio State (15–4)	West Virginia (17–2)	Iowa (17–6)	NC State (17–5)	West Virginia (23–3)	Louisville (20–8)	Iowa (22–9)	15.
16.	Georgia Tech	Louisville (0–1)	Tennessee (3–0)	Louisville (4–2)	Georgia Tech (4–1)	Georgia (7–2)	Georgia Tech (7–2)	Georgia Tech (10–2)	Ohio State (12–3)	UNLV (13–3)	Indiana (16–5)	Ohio State (15–5)	Stanford (19–5)	Iowa (19–6)	Florida State (19–6) т	Florida State (21–6)	Florida State (22–7)	16.
17.	Indiana	Villanova (1–1)	Villanova (3–1)	Tennessee (4–0)	South Carolina (5–0)	Georgia Tech (5–1)	Tennessee (8–1)	NC State (9–1)	Indiana (13–4)	Ohio State (12–4)	UNLV (14–4)	NC State (14–4)	UNLV (16–6)	Stanford (20–5)	UNLV (20–7) т	Iowa (21–8)	Arkansas (23–6)	17.
18.	Florida State	Florida (2–1)	UCLA (3–0)	Notre Dame (4–0)	Tennessee (4–1)	NC State (4–1)	NC State (6–1)	Providence (12–0) т	Stanford (12–3)	Stanford (14–4)	Stanford (15–5)	Stanford (17–5)	NC State (15–5)	UNLV (18–6)	Ball State (23–2) т	Ball State (25–2)	NC State (20–8)	18.
19.	Stanford	Stanford (1–1)	Seton Hall (5–0)	UCLA (4–0)	Georgia (5–2)	South Carolina (6–0)	UTEP (11–1)	Tennessee (10–1) т	Providence (13–1)	Georgia Tech (12–5)	Saint Mary's (17–2)	UNLV (14–5)	Ohio State (17–6)	Arkansas-Little Rock (18–5)	NC State (18–7) т	UNLV (23–7)	West Virginia (25–4)	19.
20.	NC State т Purdue т	Seton Hall (3–0)	Oregon State (2–0)	NC State (2–1)	NC State (2–1)	Tennessee (6–1)	Georgia (9–2)	UTEP (13–1)	Tennessee (11–2) т Georgia Tech (10–4) т	Saint Mary's (16–1)	LSU (14–5)	Saint Mary's (18–3) т Georgia Tech (14–6) т	UTEP (19–4) т UCLA (14–5) т	Ball State (21–2)	Saint Mary's (24–3)	Arkansas (20–6)	Alabama (23–7)	20.
	Preseason	Week 2 Nov. 28	Week 3 Dec. 5	Week 4 Dec. 12	Week 5 Dec. 19	Week 6 Dec. 26	Week 7 Jan. 2	Week 8 Jan. 9	Week 9 Jan. 16	Week 10 Jan. 23	Week 11 Jan. 30	Week 12 Feb. 6	Week 13 Feb. 13	Week 14 Feb. 20	Week 15 Feb. 27	Week 16 Mar. 6	Final Mar. 13	
		Dropped: Indiana (2–2); NC State (2–0); Purdue (0–1)	Dropped: Temple (0–2); Florida (3–2); Stanford (3–2)	Dropped: Villanova (3–3); Oregon State (3–1)	Dropped: Notre Dame (4–1); UCLA (4–1)	None	Dropped: South Carolina (6–2)	Dropped: Georgia (9–4)	Dropped: UTEP (14–2)	Dropped: Providence (14–2); Tennessee (12–3)	Dropped: Georgia Tech (12–6)	Dropped: LSU (15–6)	Dropped: Georgia Tech (14–7); Saint Mary's (18–5)	Dropped: UTEP (19–5); UCLA (15–7)	Dropped: Arkansas-Little Rock (19–6)	Dropped: Saint Mary's (25–4)	Dropped: Ball State (28–2)	
