= 1988–89 Saint Mary's Gaels men's basketball team =

American college basketball season

1988–89 Saint Mary's Gaels men's basketball
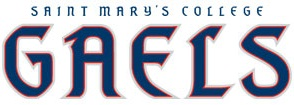

WCAC regular season champions

NCAA tournament, first round
- Conference: West Coast Athletic Conference
- Record: 25–5 (12–2 WCAC)
- Head coach: Lynn Nance (3rd season)
- Home arena: McKeon Pavilion

1988–89 West Coast Conference men's basketball standings
	Conf.				Overall
Team	W		L	PCT	W		L	PCT
Saint Mary's	12	–	2	.857	25	–	5	.833
Pepperdine	10	–	4	.714	20	–	13	.606
Loyola Marymount †	10	–	4	.714	20	–	11	.645
San Francisco	8	–	6	.571	16	–	12	.571
Santa Clara	7	–	7	.500	20	–	11	.645
Gonzaga	5	–	9	.357	14	–	14	.500
San Diego	2	–	12	.143	8	–	20	.286
Portland	2	–	12	.143	2	–	26	.071
† Conference tournament winner Rankings from AP poll

The 1988–89 Saint Mary's Gaels men's basketball team represented Saint Mary's College of California in the West Coast Athletic Conference (WCAC) during the 1988–89 college basketball season. Led by third-year head coach Lynn Nance, the Gaels played their home games on campus at McKeon Pavilion in Moraga, California. They finished the regular season with an overall record of 24–3 (.889) (12–2 in WCAC, 1st), but were upset in the semifinals of the conference tournament by fifth-seeded Santa Clara.

The Gaels received an at-large bid to the NCAA tournament, seeded eighth in the West regional. They lost to Clemson in the opening round at Boise to end the season at 25–5 (.833).

After the season in early April, Nance departed for Seattle to lead the University of Washington, his alma mater. He was succeeded by UCLA assistant Paul Landreaux, hired a few weeks later.

== Roster ==
1988–89 Saint Mary's Gaels men's basketball team
Players	Coaches
Pos. / # / Name / Height / Weight / Year / Previous school / Hometown	Head coach: Lynn Nance; Assistant coach(es) Legend: (C) Team captain; (S) Suspended; (I) Ineligible; (W) Walk-on; Injured; Current redshirt; Roster

== Schedule and results ==
Date time, TV	Rank^{#}	Opponent^{#}	Result	Record	Site (attendance) city, state
Regular season
Nov 26, 1988*		Humboldt State	W 96–46	1–0	McKeon Pavilion; Moraga, California
Nov 28, 1988*		Chico State	W 95–57	2–0	McKeon Pavilion; Moraga, California
Dec 3, 1988*		at Montana	W 71–58	3–0	Harry Adams Field House; Missoula, Montana
Dec 6, 1988*		U.S. International	W 98–67	4–0	McKeon Pavilion; Moraga, California
Dec 9, 1988*		vs. Penn State; BYU Cougar Classic	W 76–52	5–0	Marriott Center; Provo, Utah
Dec 10, 1988*		at BYU; BYU Cougar Classic	W 70–69	6–0	Marriott Center; Provo, Utah
Dec 16, 1988*		at Idaho State	W 92–48	7–0	Holt Arena; Pocatello, Idaho
Dec 19, 1988*		Eastern Washington	W 76–56	8–0	McKeon Pavilion; Moraga, California
Dec 22, 1988*		New Hampshire	W 95–56	9–0	McKeon Pavilion; Moraga, California
Dec 27, 1988*		Stanford	L 64–65	9–1	McKeon Pavilion; Moraga, California
Dec 30, 1988*		at Cal State Fullerton	W 68–61	10–1	Titan Gym; Fullerton, California
Jan 4, 1989*		at U.S. International	W 80–63	11–1	The Pavilion
Jan 7, 1989*		Southern Utah	W 80–54	12–1	McKeon Pavilion; Moraga, California
Jan 13, 1989*		Portland	W 71–45	13–1 (1–0)	McKeon Pavilion; Moraga, California
Jan 14, 1989		Gonzaga	W 67–45	14–1 (2–0)	McKeon Pavilion; Moraga, California
Jan 20, 1989		at Santa Clara	W 76–48	15–1 (3–0)	Toso Pavilion; Santa Clara, California
Jan 21, 1989		at San Francisco	W 71–53	16–1 (4–0)	War Memorial Gymnasium; San Francisco, California
Jan 27, 1989		San Francisco	L 55–62	16–2 (4–1)	McKeon Pavilion; Moraga, California
Jan 28, 1989		Santa Clara	W 53–34	17–2 (5–1)	McKeon Pavilion; Moraga, California
Feb 3, 1989		at Loyola Marymount	W 116–104	18–2 (6–1)	Gersten Pavilion; Los Angeles, California
Feb 4, 1989*		at Pepperdine	L 60–65	18–3 (6–2)	Firestone Fieldhouse; Malibu, California
Feb 10, 1989		Pepperdine	W 77–49	19–3 (7–2)	McKeon Pavilion; Moraga, California
Feb 11, 1989		Loyola Marymount	W 95–81	20–3 (8–2)	McKeon Pavilion; Moraga, California
Feb 15, 1989		San Diego	W 70–45	21–3 (9–2)	McKeon Pavilion; Moraga, California
Feb 18, 1989		at San Diego	W 65–47	22–3 (10–2)	USD Sports Center; San Diego, California
Feb 24, 1989	No. 19	at Gonzaga	W 67–63	23–3 (11–2)	Martin Centre; Spokane, Washington
Feb 25, 1989	No. 19	at Portland	W 63–41	24–3 (12–2)	Chiles Center; Portland, Oregon
WCAC tournament
Mar 4, 1989*	(1) No. 17	vs. (8) Portland; Quarterfinals	W 86–48	25–3	War Memorial Gymnasium; San Francisco, California
Mar 5, 1989*	(1) No. 17	vs. (5) Santa Clara; Semifinals	L 61–63	25–4	War Memorial Gymnasium; San Francisco, California
NCAA tournament
Mar 16, 1989*	(8 W)	vs. (9 W) Clemson; First Round	L 70–83	25–5	BSU Pavilion; Boise, Idaho
*Non-conference game. ^{#}Rankings from AP poll. (#) Tournament seedings in parentheses. W=West. All times are in Pacific time.
