= 1988–89 Duke Blue Devils men's basketball team =

American college basketball season

1988–89 Duke Blue Devils men's basketball

NCAA tournament, Final Four
- Conference: Atlantic Coast Conference

Ranking
- Coaches: No. 7
- AP: No. 9
- Record: 28–8 (9–5 ACC)
- Head coach: Mike Krzyzewski (9th season)
- Assistant coaches: Pete Gaudet (7th season); Mike Brey (2nd season); Tommy Amaker (1st season)
- Home arena: Cameron Indoor Stadium

1988–89 ACC men's basketball standings
	Conf.				Overall
Team	W		L	PCT	W		L	PCT
No. 19 NC State	10	–	4	.714	22	–	9	.710
No. 9 Duke	9	–	5	.643	28	–	8	.778
Virginia	9	–	5	.643	22	–	11	.667
No. 5 North Carolina †	9	–	5	.643	29	–	8	.784
Georgia Tech	8	–	6	.571	20	–	12	.625
Clemson	7	–	7	.500	19	–	11	.633
Wake Forest	3	–	11	.214	13	–	15	.464
Maryland	1	–	13	.071	9	–	20	.310
† 1989 ACC tournament winner Rankings from AP Poll

The 1988–89 Duke Blue Devils men's basketball team represented Duke University. The head coach was Mike Krzyzewski. The team played its home games in the Cameron Indoor Stadium in Durham, North Carolina, and was a member of the Atlantic Coast Conference. Duke finished with an overall record of 28–8 (9–5 ACC). They were invited to the 1989 NCAA Tournament as a #2 seed. Duke advanced to the Final Four after wins over South Carolina State, West Virginia, Minnesota and Georgetown. However, their season came to an end after a one-sided loss to Seton Hall 95–78.

== Roster ==
1989–90 Duke Blue Devils men's basketball team
Players
Coaches

Pos.	#	Name	Height	Weight	Year	Hometown
C	30	Alaa Abdelnaby	6 ft 10 in (2.08 m)	240 lb (109 kg)	Jr	Bloomfield, New Jersey
F	21	Robert Brickey	6 ft 5 in (1.96 m)	205 lb (93 kg)	Jr	Fayetteville, North Carolina
F/C	45	Clay Buckley	6 ft 10 in (2.08 m)	225 lb (102 kg)	So	Wayne, Pennsylvania
C	42	George Burgin	7 ft 0 in (2.13 m)	215 lb (98 kg)	Jr	Fairfax, Virginia
G/F	23	Brian Davis	6 ft 6 in (1.98 m)	185 lb (84 kg)	Fr	Bladensburg, Maryland
F	35	Danny Ferry	6 ft 10 in (2.08 m)	230 lb (104 kg)	Sr	Bowie, Maryland
G	3	Phil Henderson	6 ft 4 in (1.93 m)	170 lb (77 kg)	Jr	University Park, Illinois
F	22	Greg Koubek	6 ft 6 in (1.98 m)	205 lb (93 kg)	So	Clifton Park, New York
F/C	32	Christian Laettner	6 ft 10 in (2.08 m)	225 lb (102 kg)	Fr	Angola, New York
C	34	Crawford Palmer	6 ft 9 in (2.06 m)	225 lb (102 kg)	Fr	Arlington, Virginia
F	33	John Smith	6 ft 7 in (2.01 m)	225 lb (102 kg)	Sr	Fort Washington, Maryland
G	14	Quin Snyder	6 ft 3 in (1.91 m)	175 lb (79 kg)	Sr	Mercer Island, Washington

Head coach

- Mike Krzyzewski (Army)

Assistant coach(es)

- Pete Gaudet (Boston University)
- Mike Brey (George Washington)
- Tommy Amaker (Duke)
- Bob Bender (Indiana)

Legend

- (C) Team captain
- (S) Suspended
- (I) Ineligible
- (W) Walk-on
- Injured
- Current redshirt

== Schedule ==
Date time, TV	Rank^{#}	Opponent^{#}	Result	Record	Site city, state
Regular season
November 19, 1988*	No. 1	vs. Kentucky; Tipoff Classic	W 80–55	1–0	Springfield Civic Center; Springfield, MA
November 26, 1988*	No. 1	The Citadel	W 93–52	2–0	Cameron Indoor Stadium; Durham, NC
November 30, 1988*	No. 1	East Carolina	W 95–46	3–0	Cameron Indoor Stadium; Durham, NC
December 3, 1988*	No. 1	Northwestern	W 86–62	4–0	Cameron Indoor Stadium; Durham, NC
December 5, 1988*	No. 1	Stetson	W 90–62	5–0	Cameron Indoor Stadium; Durham, NC
December 10, 1988*	No. 1	at Miami (FL)	W 117–102	6–0	Miami Arena; Miami, FL
December 21, 1988	No. 1	Wake Forest	W 94–88	7–0	Cameron Indoor Stadium; Durham, NC
December 29, 1988*	No. 1	Cornell	W 94–59	8–0	Cameron Indoor Stadium; Durham, NC
January 3, 1989*	No. 1	at Washington	W 87–61	9–0	Bank of America Arena; Seattle, WA
January 5, 1989*	No. 1	Davidson	W 101–53	10–0	Cameron Indoor Stadium; Durham, NC
January 7, 1989	No. 1	at Virginia	W 84–76	11–0	University Hall; Charlottesville, VA
January 11, 1989*	No. 1	William & Mary	W 100–38	12–0	Cameron Indoor Stadium; Durham, NC
January 14, 1989	No. 1	at Maryland	W 82–72	13–0	Cole Field House; College Park, MD
January 18, 1989	No. 1	No. 13 North Carolina; Rivalry	L 71–91	13–1	Cameron Indoor Stadium; Durham, NC
January 21, 1989	No. 1	at Wake Forest	L 71–75	13–2	Greensboro Coliseum; Greensboro, NC
January 26, 1989	No. 8	at No. 15 NC State	L 73–88	13–3	Reynolds Coliseum; Raleigh, NC
January 29, 1989	No. 8	Clemson	W 92–62	14–3	Cameron Indoor Stadium; Durham, NC
February 2, 1989	No. 12	at Georgia Tech	L 76–81	14–4	Alexander Memorial Coliseum; Atlanta, GA
February 5, 1989*	No. 12	at Notre Dame	W 102–80	15–4	Purcell Pavilion; South Bend, IN
February 8, 1989	No. 14	Virginia	W 85–66	16–4	Cameron Indoor Stadium; Durham, NC
February 11, 1989	No. 14	Maryland	W 86–60	17–4	Cameron Indoor Stadium; Durham, NC
February 14, 1989*	No. 11	at Harvard	W 98–59	18–4	Lavietes Pavilion; Boston, MA
February 18, 1989*	No. 11	Kansas	W 102–77	19–4	Cameron Indoor Stadium; Durham, NC
February 20, 1989	No. 11	Georgia Tech	W 91–66	20–4	Cameron Indoor Stadium; Durham, NC
February 23, 1989	No. 9	No. 17 NC State	W 86–65	21–4	Cameron Indoor Stadium; Durham, NC
February 26, 1989*	No. 9	vs. No. 2 Arizona	L 75–77	21–5	Brendan Byrne Arena; East Rutherford, NJ
March 1, 1989	No. 9	at Clemson	L 74–79	21–6	Littlejohn Coliseum; Clemson, SC
March 5, 1989	No. 9	at No. 5 North Carolina; Rivalry	W 88–86	22–6	Dean Smith Center; Chapel Hill, NC
ACC Tournament
March 10, 1989	No. 7	vs. Wake Forest; Quarterfinals	W 88–64	23–6	Omni Coliseum; Atlanta, GA
March 11, 1989	No. 7	vs. Virginia; Semifinals	W 69–58	24–6	Omni Coliseum; Atlanta, GA
March 12, 1989	No. 7	vs. No. 9 North Carolina; Finals	L 74–77	24–7	Omni Coliseum; Atlanta, GA
NCAA tournament
March 16, 1989*	No. 9	vs. South Carolina State; First Round	W 90–69	25–7	Greensboro Coliseum; Greensboro, NC
March 18, 1989*	No. 9	vs. No. 17 West Virginia; Second Round	W 70–63	26–7	Greensboro Coliseum; Greensboro, NC
March 24, 1989*	No. 9	vs. Minnesota; Sweet Sixteen	W 87–70	27–7	Brendan Byrne Arena; East Rutherford, NJ
March 26, 1989*	No. 9	vs. No. 2 Georgetown; Elite Eight	W 85–77	28–7	Brendan Byrne Arena; East Rutherford, NJ
April 1, 1989*	No. 9	vs. No. 11 Seton Hall; Final Four	L 78–95	28–8	Kingdome; Seattle, WA
*Non-conference game. ^{#}Rankings from AP Poll. (#) Tournament seedings in parentheses. Source: Duke media guide

== Awards and honors ==
- Danny Ferry, USBWA College Player of the Year
- Mike Krzyzewski, ACC Coach of the Year
- Mike Krzyzewski, Naismith College Coach of the Year

== Team players drafted into the NBA ==
Round	Pick	Player	NBA club
1	2	Danny Ferry	Los Angeles Clippers
