= 1988–89 UNLV Runnin' Rebels basketball team =

American college basketball season

1988–89 UNLV Runnin' Rebels basketball

Big West tournament champions Big West regular season champions

NCAA tournament, Elite Eight
- Conference: Big West Conference

Ranking
- Coaches: No. 14
- AP: No. 15
- Record: 29–8 (16–2 Big West)
- Head coach: Jerry Tarkanian (16th season)
- Assistant coaches: Tim Grgurich (8th season); Keith Starr (3rd season); Ron Ganulin (1st season)
- Home arena: Thomas & Mack Center

1988–89 Big West men's basketball standings
	Conf.				Overall
Team	W		L	PCT	W		L	PCT
No. 15 UNLV †	16	–	2	.889	29	–	8	.784
New Mexico State	12	–	6	.667	21	–	11	.656
UC Santa Barbara	11	–	7	.611	21	–	9	.700
Cal State Fullerton	10	–	8	.556	16	–	13	.552
Long Beach State	10	–	8	.556	13	–	15	.464
Utah State	10	–	8	.556	12	–	16	.429
Fresno State	9	–	9	.500	15	–	14	.517
UC Irvine	8	–	10	.444	12	–	17	.414
Pacific	3	–	15	.167	7	–	21	.250
San Jose State	1	–	17	.056	5	–	23	.179
† 1989 Big West tournament winner Rankings from AP poll

The 1988–89 UNLV Runnin' Rebels basketball team represented the University of Nevada Las Vegas as a member of the Big West Conference during the 1988–89 college basketball season. Led by head coach Jerry Tarkanian, the team played its home games in the Thomas & Mack Center. The Runnin' Rebels won conference regular season and tournament titles, reached the Elite Eight of the NCAA tournament, and finished with an overall record of 29–8.

== Roster ==
1988–89 UNLV Runnin' Rebels men's basketball team
Players
Coaches

Pos.	#	Name	Height	Weight	Year	Hometown
C	00	David Butler	6 ft 10 in (2.08 m)	200 lb (91 kg)	Jr	Washington, D.C.
G	5	Stacey Cvijanovich	6 ft 3 in (1.91 m)	200 lb (91 kg)	Jr	Oxnard, California
G	12	Anderson Hunt	6 ft 2 in (1.88 m)	176 lb (80 kg)	Fr	Detroit, Michigan
G	15	Bryan Emerzian	5 ft 11 in (1.8 m)	165 lb (75 kg)	Fr	Waukegan, Illinois
F	32	Stacey Augmon	6 ft 8 in (2.03 m)	206 lb (93 kg)	So	Pasadena, California
F	33	Barry Young	6 ft 7 in (2.01 m)	223 lb (101 kg)	So	Ellicott City, Maryland
C	34	James Jones	6 ft 9 in (2.06 m)	220 lb (100 kg)	Jr	Cincinnati, Ohio
F	35	Moses Scurry	6 ft 7 in (2.01 m)	220 lb (100 kg)	Jr	Brooklyn, New York
F/C	44	George Ackles	6 ft 9 in (2.06 m)	210 lb (95 kg)		Pittsburgh, Pennsylvania
G	50	Greg Anthony	6 ft 2 in (1.88 m)	190 lb (86 kg)	So	Las Vegas, Nevada
F	53	Chris Jeter	6 ft 8 in (2.03 m)	216 lb (98 kg)	So	San Diego, California
G		John Smith	6 ft 2 in (1.88 m)	—	So

Head coach

- Jerry Tarkanian (Fresno State)

Assistant coach(es)

- Tim Grgurich
- Ron Ganulin
- Cleveland Edwards

Legend

- (C) Team captain
- (S) Suspended
- (I) Ineligible
- (W) Walk-on
- Injured
- Current redshirt

== Schedule and results ==
Date time, TV	Rank^{#}	Opponent^{#}	Result	Record	High points	High rebounds	High assists	Site (attendance) city, state
Regular season
Nov 25, 1988*	No. 8	vs. DePaul; Maui Invitational	W 86–77	1–0	–	–	–	Lahaina Civic Center (3,700); Lahaina, HI
Nov 26, 1988*	No. 8	vs. No. 4 Oklahoma; Maui Invitational	L 81–83	1–1	–	–	–	Lahaina Civic Center (4,200); Lahaina, HI
Nov 27, 1988*	No. 8	vs. Memphis State; Maui Invitational	W 90–86	2–1	–	–	–	Lahaina Civic Center (3,700); Lahaina, HI
Dec 10, 1988*	No. 9	at No. 10 Arizona	L 75–86	2–2	–	–	–	McKale Center (13,624); Tucson, AZ
Dec 15, 1988	No. 13	UC Irvine	W 100–85	3–2 (1–0)	–	–	–	Thomas & Mack Center (17,453); Las Vegas, NV
Dec 21, 1988*	No. 13	Rhode Island	W 88–69	4–2	–	–	–	Thomas & Mack Center (16,517); Las Vegas, NV
Dec 22, 1988*	No. 13	Texas A&M	W 110–67	5–2	–	–	–	Thomas & Mack Center (17,437); Las Vegas, NV
Dec 28, 1988*	No. 12	Pepperdine	W 88–56	6–2	–	–	–	Thomas & Mack Center (18,024); Las Vegas, NV
Dec 29, 1988	No. 12	San Jose State	W 101–68	7–2 (2–0)	–	–	–	Thomas & Mack Center (17,535); Las Vegas, NV
Jan 3, 1989	No. 12	at Long Beach State	W 97–76	8–2 (3–0)	–	–	–	The Gold Mine (1,889); Long Beach, CA
Jan 5, 1989	No. 12	New Mexico State	W 79–58	9–2 (4–0)	–	–	–	Thomas & Mack Center (17,971); Las Vegas, NV
Jan 9, 1989	No. 12	Pacific	W 83–61	10–2 (5–0)	–	–	–	Thomas & Mack Center (17,463); Las Vegas, NV
Jan 11, 1989	No. 11	at Fresno State	W 83–77	11–2 (6–0)	–	–	–	Selland Arena (10,159); Fresno, CA
Jan 16, 1989	No. 11	Cal State Fullerton	W 66–63	12–2 (7–0)	–	–	–	Thomas & Mack Center (18,405); Las Vegas, NV
Jan 19, 1989	No. 10	Utah State	W 102–80	13–2 (8–0)	–	–	–	Thomas & Mack Center (18,732); Las Vegas, NV
Jan 22, 1989*	No. 10	at No. 4 Louisville	L 74–92	13–3	–	–	–	Freedom Hall (19,632); Louisville, KY
Jan 25, 1989	No. 13	at Utah State	W 94–68	14–3 (9–0)	–	–	–	Dee Glen Smith Spectrum (10,024); Logan, UT
Jan 30, 1989*	No. 13	No. 4 Oklahoma	L 88–90	14–4	–	–	–	Thomas & Mack Center (19,000); Las Vegas, NV
Feb 4, 1989	No. 16	at UC Irvine	L 98–99	14–5 (9–1)	–	–	–	Bren Events Center (5,000); Irvine, CA
Feb 6, 1989	No. 19	UC Santa Barbara	W 77–61	15–5 (10–1)	–	–	–	Thomas & Mack Center (18,683); Las Vegas, NV
Feb 9, 1989	No. 19	at Cal State Fullerton	L 92–93	15–6 (10–2)	–	–	–	Titan Gym (4,000)
Feb 12, 1989*	No. 19	at No. 17 NC State	W 89–80	16–6	–	–	–	Reynolds Coliseum (12,400); Raleigh, NC
Feb 16, 1989	No. 18	at San Jose State	W 95–66	17–6 (11–2)	–	–	–	San Jose Civic Auditorium (2,454); San Jose, CA
Feb 19, 1989*	No. 18	Temple	W 62–60	18–6	–	–	–	Thomas & Mack Center (19,020); Las Vegas, NV
Feb 20, 1989	No. 18	Long Beach State	W 104–74	19–6 (12–2)	–	–	–	Thomas & Mack Center (17,191); Las Vegas, NV
Feb 23, 1989	No. 18	Fresno State	W 75–71	20–6 (13–2)	–	–	–	Thomas & Mack Center (19,000); Las Vegas, NV
Feb 25, 1989*	No. 18	at LSU	L 87–88	20–7	25 – Augmon	–	–	Maravich Assembly Center (13,581); Baton Rouge, LA
Feb 27, 1989	No. 18	at UC Santa Barbara	W 84–75	21–7 (14–2)	–	–	–	The Thunderdome (6,000); Santa Barbara, CA
Mar 2, 1989	No. 18	at Pacific	W 81–71	22–7 (15–2)	–	–	–	Alex G. Spanos Center (4,477); Stockton, CA
Mar 5, 1989	No. 18	at New Mexico State	W 75–73	23–7 (16–2)	–	–	–	Pan American Center (12,839); Las Cruces, NM
Big West tournament
Mar 9, 1989*	No. 18	vs. UC Irvine; Big West tournament Quarterfinal	W 102–82	24–7	–	–	–	Long Beach Arena (7,242); Long Beach, CA
Mar 10, 1989*	No. 18	vs. Cal State Fullerton; Big West tournament Semifinal	W 99–83	25–7	–	–	–	Long Beach Arena (8,153); Long Beach, CA
Mar 11, 1989*	No. 18	vs. New Mexico State; Big West tournament championship	W 68–62	26–7	–	–	–	Long Beach Arena (7,034); Long Beach, CA
NCAA Tournament
Mar 16, 1989*	(4 W) No. 15	vs. (13 W) Idaho; First round	W 68–56	27–7	17 – Augmon	14 – Scurry	4 – Hunt	BSU Pavilion (12,241); Boise, ID
Mar 18, 1989*	(4 W) No. 15	vs. (12 W) DePaul; Second Round	W 85–70	28–7	23 – Butler	11 – Augmon	7 – Hunt	BSU Pavilion (12,428); Boise, ID
Mar 23, 1989*	(4 W) No. 15	vs. (1 W) No. 1 Arizona; Regional semifinal	W 68–67	29–7	21 – Hunt	6 – Tied	11 – Anthony	McNichols Sports Arena (16,813); Denver, CO
Mar 25, 1989*	(4 W) No. 15	vs. (3 W) No. 11 Seton Hall; Regional final	L 61–84	29–8	16 – Anthony	14 – Scurry	4 – Anthony	McNichols Sports Arena (16,813); Denver, CO
*Non-conference game. ^{#}Rankings from AP Poll. (#) Tournament seedings in parentheses.

== Rankings ==
Ranking movements Legend: ██ Increase in ranking ██ Decrease in ranking
	Week																	
Poll	Pre	1	2	3	4	5	6	7	8	9	10	11	12	13	14	15	16	Final
AP	10	8	9	9	13	13	12	12	11	10	13	16	19	18	18	18	18	15
Coaches	7	7^	8	8	13	14	10	12	11	10	16	17	19	17	18	17	19	14

^Coaches did not release a week-1 poll.

== Awards and honors ==
- Stacey Augmon – NABC Defensive Player of the Year, Big West Conference Player of the Year
