= 1988–89 Arizona Wildcats men's basketball team =

American college basketball season

1988–89 Arizona Wildcats men's basketball

NCAA Division I regular season champions Pacific-10 regular season champions Pacific-10 tournament champions

NCAA tournament, Sweet Sixteen
- Conference: Pacific-10

Ranking
- Coaches: No. 1
- AP: No. 1
- Record: 29–4 (17–1 Pac-10)
- Head coach: Lute Olson (6th season)
- Assistant coaches: Kevin O'Neill (3rd season); Jessie Evans (1st season)
- Home arena: McKale Center (Capacity: 14,545)

1988–89 Pacific-10 Conference men's basketball standings
	Conf.				Overall
Team	W		L	PCT	W		L	PCT
No. 1 Arizona †	17	–	1	.944	29	–	4	.879
No. 13 Stanford	15	–	3	.833	26	–	7	.788
UCLA	13	–	5	.722	21	–	10	.677
Oregon State	13	–	5	.722	22	–	8	.733
California	10	–	8	.556	20	–	13	.606
Washington	8	–	10	.444	12	–	16	.429
Arizona State	5	–	13	.278	12	–	16	.429
Washington State	4	–	14	.222	10	–	19	.345
Oregon	3	–	15	.167	8	–	21	.276
USC	2	–	16	.111	10	–	22	.313
† Conference tournament winner As of April 15, 1989; Rankings from AP poll

The 1988–89 Arizona Wildcats men's basketball team represented the University of Arizona. The head coach was Lute Olson. The team played its home games in the McKale Center in Tucson, Arizona, and was a member of the Pacific-10 Conference. In the Pac-10 Basketball Tournament, Arizona beat Stanford by a score of 73–51 to claim its second consecutive Pac-10 title.

== Roster ==
1988–89 Arizona Wildcats men's basketball team
Players
Coaches

Pos.	#	Name	Height	Weight	Year	Previous school	Hometown
F	00	Anthony Cook	6 ft 9 in (2.06 m)	—	Sr	Van Nuys HS	Los Angeles, CA
G	11	Kenny Lofton	5 ft 11 in (1.8 m)	—	Sr	Washington HS	East Chicago, IN
G	12	Matt Othick	6 ft 0 in (1.83 m)	—	Fr	Bishop Gorman HS	Las Vegas, NV
G	24	Matt Muehlebach	—	—	So	Stillwell HS	Rockhurst, KS
F	30	Wayne Womack	6 ft 8 in (2.03 m)	—	Fr	John Muir HS	Pasadena, CA
G/F	32	Sean Elliott	6 ft 8 in (2.03 m)	210 lb (95 kg)	Sr	Cholla HS	Tucson, AZ
F	33	Ron Curry	6 ft 8 in (2.03 m)	—	Fr	Bloomington HS	Bloomington, IN
C	34	Brian David	6 ft 9 in (2.06 m)	—	Jr	Kuemper HS	Templeton, IA
SF	35	Jud Buechler	6 ft 6 in (1.98 m)	210 lb (95 kg)	Jr	Poway HS	Poway, CA
C	42	Sean Rooks (redshirt)	6 ft 10 in (2.08 m)	250 lb (113 kg)	So	Fontana HS	Fontana, CA
G	44	Harvey Mason	6 ft 3 in (1.91 m)	—	RS Jr	Crescenta HS	La Crescenta, CA
F/C	45	Mark Georgeson (redshirt)	6 ft 10 in (2.08 m)	235 lb (107 kg)	Fr	Marina HS	Huntington Beach, CA

Head coach

- Lute Olson (Augsburg)

Assistant coach(es)

Legend

- (C) Team captain
- (S) Suspended
- (I) Ineligible
- (W) Walk-on
- Injured
- Current redshirt

== Schedule and results ==
Date time, TV	Rank^{#}	Opponent^{#}	Result	Record	Site city, state
Regular season
Nov 30, 1988*	No. 11	New Mexico	W 80–67	1–0	McKale Center; Tucson, Arizona
Dec 2, 1988*	No. 11	vs. No. 10 North Carolina; Diet Pepsi Tournament of Champions	L 72–79	1–1	Charlotte Coliseum; Charlotte, North Carolina
Dec 3, 1988*	No. 11	vs. No. 17 Temple; Diet Pepsi Tournament of Champions	W 68–50	2–1	Charlotte, Coliseum; Charlotte, North Carolina
Dec 10, 1988*	No. 10	No. 9 UNLV	W 86–75	3–1	McKale Center; Tucson, Arizona
Dec 18, 1988	No. 9	Washington State	W 76–59	4–1 (1–0)	McKale Center; Tucson, Arizona
Dec 20, 1988	No. 9	Washington	W 116–61	5–1 (2–0)	McKale Center; Tucson, Arizona
Dec 23, 1988	No. 9	at Oregon State	W 73–69	6–1 (3–0)	Gill Coliseum; Corvallis, Oregon
Dec 28, 1988*	No. 8	Loyola-Chicago	W 106–82	7–1	McKale Center; Tucson, Arizona
Dec 30, 1988*	No. 8	Pittsburgh	W 88–62	8–1	McKale Center; Tucson, Arizona
Jan 5, 1989	No. 8	at Stanford	L 78–83	8–2 (3–1)	Maples Pavilion; Stanford, California
Jan 7, 1989	No. 8	at California	W 64–55	9–2 (4–1)	Harmon Gym; Berkeley, California
Jan 12, 1989	No. 12	Oregon State	W 85–64	10–2 (5–1)	McKale Center; Tucson, Arizona
Jan 14, 1989	No. 12	Oregon	W 95–71	11–2 (6–1)	McKale Center; Tucson, Arizona
Jan 19, 1989	No. 9	at USC	W 97–69	12–2 (7–1)	L.A. Sports Arena; Los Angeles, California
Jan 21, 1989*	No. 9	Villanova	W 75–67	13–2	McKale Center; Tucson, Arizona
Jan 26, 1989	No. 6	at Arizona State; Rivalry	W 96–71	14–2 (8–1)	ASU Activity Center; Tempe, Arizona
Jan 29, 1989*	No. 6	No. 19 Stanford	W 72–52	15–2 (9–1)	McKale Center; Tucson, Arizona
Feb 2, 1989	No. 4	California	W 86–59	16–2 (10–1)	McKale Center; Tucson, Arizona
Feb 5, 1989	No. 4	at Washington	W 85–68	17–2 (11–1)	Bank of America Arena; Seattle, Washington
Feb 9, 1989	No. 1	at Oregon	W 78–57	18–2 (12–1)	McArthur Court; Eugene, Oregon
Feb 12, 1989*	No. 1	at No. 5 Oklahoma	L 80–82	18–3	Lloyd Noble Center; Norman, Oklahoma
Feb 16, 1989	No. 2	USC	W 93–70	19–3 (13–1)	McKale Center; Tucson, Arizona
Feb 18, 1989	No. 2	UCLA; Rivalry	W 102–62	20–3 (14–1)	McKale Center; Tucson, Arizona
Feb 23, 1989	No. 2	Arizona State; Rivalry	W 109–74	21–3 (15–1)	McKale Center; Tucson, Arizona
Feb 26, 1989*	No. 2	vs. No. 9 Duke	W 77–75	22–3	Brendan Byrne Arena; East Rutherford, New Jersey
Mar 2, 1989	No. 1	at Washington State	W 74–48	23–3 (16–1)	Friel Court; Pullman, Washington
Mar 4, 1989	No. 1	at UCLA; Rivalry	W 89–86	24–3 (17–1)	Pauley Pavilion; Los Angeles, California
Pac-10 Tournament
Mar 10, 1989*	(1) No. 1	vs. (8) Washington State; Pac-10 Tournament Quarterfinal	W 62–54	25–3	The Forum; Inglewood, California
Mar 11, 1989*	(1) No. 1	vs. (4) Oregon State; Pac-10 Tournament Semifinal	W 98–87	26–3	The Forum; Inglewood, California
Mar 12, 1989*	(1) No. 1	vs. (2) No. 12 Stanford; Pac-10 tournament championship	W 73–51	27–3	The Forum; Inglewood, California
NCAA Tournament
Mar 16, 1989*	(1 W) No. 1	vs. (16 W) Robert Morris; First round	W 94–60	28–3	BSU Pavilion; Boise, Idaho
Mar 18, 1989*	(1 W) No. 1	vs. (9 W) Clemson; Second Round	W 94–68	29–3	BSU Pavilion; Boise, Idaho
Mar 23, 1989*	(1 W) No. 1	vs. (4 W) No. 15 UNLV; West Regional semifinal – Sweet Sixteen	L 67–68	29–4	McNichols Sports Arena; Denver, Colorado
*Non-conference game. ^{#}Rankings from AP poll. (#) Tournament seedings in parentheses. W=West.

=== NCAA basketball tournament ===
Seeding in brackets

- West
  - Arizona (1) 94, Robert Morris (16) 60
  - Arizona 94, Clemson (9) 68
  - UNLV (4) 68, Arizona 67

== Rankings ==
Ranking movements Legend: ██ Increase in ranking ██ Decrease in ranking — = Not ranked
	Week																	
Poll	Pre	1	2	3	4	5	6	7	8	9	10	11	12	13	14	15	16	Final
AP	11	10	11	10	9	9	8	8	12	9	6	4	1	2	2	1	1	1
Coaches	11	—	9	10	9	9	8	7	10	7	5	3	1	2	2	1	1	1

^Coaches did not release a Week 1 poll.

== Awards and honors ==
- Sean Elliott, Pacific-10 Player of the Year
- Sean Elliott, Pacific-10 Conference men's basketball tournament Most Valuable Player
- Sean Elliott, Adolph Rupp Trophy
- Sean Elliott, Associated Press College Basketball Player of the Year
- Sean Elliott, John R. Wooden Award
- Sean Elliott, State Farm Division I Player of the Year Award

== Team players drafted into the NBA ==
Round	Pick	Player	NBA club
1	3	Sean Elliott	San Antonio Spurs
1	24	Anthony Cook	Phoenix Suns
