= 1988–89 Oregon State Beavers men's basketball team =

American college basketball season

1988–89 Oregon State Beavers men's basketball

NCAA tournament, first round
- Conference: Pac-10 Conference
- Record: 22–8 (13–5 Pac 10)
- Head coach: Ralph Miller (19th season)
- Assistant coach: Jim Anderson
- Home arena: Gill Coliseum

1988–89 Pacific-10 Conference men's basketball standings
| | Conf. | | | | Overall |
| Team | W | | L | PCT | W | | L | PCT |
|---|---|---|---|---|---|---|---|---|
| No. 1 Arizona † | 17 | – | 1 | .944 | 29 | – | 4 | .879 |
| No. 13 Stanford | 15 | – | 3 | .833 | 26 | – | 7 | .788 |
| UCLA | 13 | – | 5 | .722 | 21 | – | 10 | .677 |
| Oregon State | 13 | – | 5 | .722 | 22 | – | 8 | .733 |
| California | 10 | – | 8 | .556 | 20 | – | 13 | .606 |
| Washington | 8 | – | 10 | .444 | 12 | – | 16 | .429 |
| Arizona State | 5 | – | 13 | .278 | 12 | – | 16 | .429 |
| Washington State | 4 | – | 14 | .222 | 10 | – | 19 | .345 |
| Oregon | 3 | – | 15 | .167 | 8 | – | 21 | .276 |
| USC | 2 | – | 16 | .111 | 10 | – | 22 | .313 |
† Conference tournament winner As of April 15, 1989; Rankings from AP poll

The 1988–89 Oregon State Beavers men's basketball team represented Oregon State University in Corvallis, Oregon, during the 1988–89 season.

Led by Ralph Miller, in his 19th and final season at Oregon State, and point guard Gary Payton, the Beavers finished at 22–8 (13–5 Pac-10, third). In the Pac-10 tournament, they lost in the semifinals to top-ranked Arizona. Seeded sixth in the West regional of the NCAA tournament, Oregon State was upset in overtime in the first round in Tucson by Evansville.

== Roster ==
1988–89 Oregon State Beavers men's basketball team
Players
Coaches

| Pos. | # | Name | Height | Weight | Year | Previous school | Hometown |
|---|---|---|---|---|---|---|---|
| G | 15 | Eric Knox | 6 ft 2 in (1.88 m) | — | Sr |
| G | 20 | Gary Payton | 6 ft 3 in (1.91 m) | 175 lb (79 kg) | Jr | Skyline HS | Oakland, California |
| F | 24 | Earl Martin | 6 ft 5 in (1.96 m) | — | Jr |
| C | 44 | Scott Haskin | 6 ft 11 in (2.11 m) | 240 lb (109 kg) | Fr | Beaumont HS | Beaumont, California |

Head coach

- Ralph Miller (Kansas)

Assistant coach(es)

- Jim Anderson (Oregon State)

Legend

- (C) Team captain
- (S) Suspended
- (I) Ineligible
- (W) Walk-on
- Injured
- Current redshirt

== Schedule and results ==
| Date time, TV | Rank^{#} | Opponent^{#} | Result | Record | Site (attendance) city, state |
Non-conference regular season
| Nov 26, 1988* | | Portland | W 106–59 | 1–0 | Gill Coliseum; Corvallis, OR |
| Dec 3, 1988* | | Kansas State | W 66–48 | 2–0 | Gill Coliseum; Corvallis, OR |
| Dec 7, 1988* | | at Loyola Marymount | W 100–90 | 3–0 | Gersten Pavilion; Los Angeles, CA |
| Dec 10, 1988* | | at Boise State | L 43–53 | 3–1 | BSU Pavilion; Boise, ID |
Pac-10 regular season
| Dec 17, 1988 | | at Stanford | L 59–87 | 3–2 (0–1) | Maples Pavilion; Stanford, CA |
Non-conference regular season
| Dec 19, 1988* | | Gonzaga | W 74–51 | 4–2 | Gill Coliseum; Corvallis, OR |
Non-conference regular season
| Feb 11, 1989* | | at Marquette | W 76–73 | 16–5 | Bradley Center; Milwaukee, WI |
Pac-10 regular season
| Mar 2, 1989 | | at Oregon; Civil War | W 73–68 | 20–6 (12–5) | McArthur Court; Eugene, OR |
| Mar 5, 1989 | | Oregon; Civil War | W 98–79 | 21–6 (13–5) | Gill Coliseum; Corvallis, OR |
Pac-10 tournament
| Mar 10, 1989* | | vs. California; Pac-10 tournament quarterfinal | W 79–66 | 22–6 | The Forum; Inglewood, CA |
| Mar 11, 1989* | | vs. No. 1 Arizona; Pac-10 tournament semifinal | L 87–98 | 22–7 | The Forum; Inglewood, CA |
NCAA tournament
| Mar 17, 1989* | (6 W) | vs. (11 W) Evansville | L 90–94 ^{OT} | 22–8 | McKale Center; Tucson, AZ |
*Non-conference game. ^{#}Rankings from AP Poll. (#) Tournament seedings in parentheses.

== Awards and honors ==
- Gary Payton – AP All-American (Honorable Mention)
- Ralph Miller – co-Pac-10 Coach of the Year
