= 1989 Pacific-10 Conference men's basketball tournament =

- Classification: Division I
- Season: 1988–89
- Teams: 10
- Site: Great Western Forum; Inglewood, California
- Champions: Arizona (2nd title)
- Winning coach: Lute Olson (2nd title)
- MVP: Sean Elliott (Arizona)
- Attendance: 41,994 (5 sessions)

1988–89 Pacific-10 Conference men's basketball standings
	Conf.				Overall
Team	W		L	PCT	W		L	PCT
No. 1 Arizona †	17	–	1	.944	29	–	4	.879
No. 13 Stanford	15	–	3	.833	26	–	7	.788
UCLA	13	–	5	.722	21	–	10	.677
Oregon State	13	–	5	.722	22	–	8	.733
California	10	–	8	.556	20	–	13	.606
Washington	8	–	10	.444	12	–	16	.429
Arizona State	5	–	13	.278	12	–	16	.429
Washington State	4	–	14	.222	10	–	19	.345
Oregon	3	–	15	.167	8	–	21	.276
USC	2	–	16	.111	10	–	22	.313
† Conference tournament winner As of April 15, 1989; Rankings from AP poll

The 1989 Pacific-10 Conference men's basketball tournament was played March 9–12 at the Great Western Forum in Inglewood, California. Like the previous year, both top seeds advanced to the final; Stanford made its first appearance in the title game and met the top-seeded (and top-ranked) Wildcats. Comfortably repeating as champion of the tournament was Arizona, which received the Pac-10's automatic bid to the NCAA tournament. Repeating as the Most Outstanding Player was Sean Elliott of Arizona.

This was the tournament's third edition and all ten teams participated.

== Bracket ==
Play-in Round; Thursday, March 9
8	Washington State	78
9	Oregon	56
7	Arizona State	82
10	USC	94

Quarterfinals; Friday, March 10
1	#1 Arizona	62
8	Washington State	54
4	Oregon State	79
5	California	66
3	UCLA	64
6	Washington	54
2	#12 Stanford	66
10	USC	61

Semifinals; Saturday, March 11
1	#1 Arizona	98
4	Oregon State	87
3	UCLA	86
2	#12 Stanford	95

Final; Sunday, March 12
1	#1 Arizona	73
2	#12 Stanford	51

There were no overtime games

== Tournament Notes ==
- Arizona was ranked #1 in the nation entering the tournament.
- For the 3rd year in a row, no universities played their arch-rival in the tournament.
- 70 field goals were scored in a game by Arizona (37) and OSU (33). This is still the record number of FGs by both teams in a game for this tournament.
- Arizona had 23 assists in the game vs. OSU (a current record).
- USC upset 7 seed ASU to finally win a Pac-10 Tournament game after 3 tries. They became the 10th team to get a tournament win in its history.
- Arizona, UCLA, Oregon State, and Stanford all were invited to the 1989 NCAA Division I men's basketball tournament.
- California was invited to the 1989 National Invitation Tournament.

== All tournament team ==
- Sean Elliott, Arizona
- Jud Buechler, Arizona
- Anthony Cook, Arizona
- Todd Lichti, Stanford
- Gary Payton, Oregon State
