= 1988–89 Loyola Marymount Lions men's basketball team =

American college basketball season

1988–89 Loyola Marymount Lions men's basketball

WCAC tournament champions

NCAA tournament, first round
- Conference: West Coast Athletic Conference
- Record: 20–11 (10–4 WCAC)
- Head coach: Paul Westhead (4th season)
- Assistant coaches: Jay Hillock (4th season); Judas Prada; Bruce Woods
- Home arena: Gersten Pavilion

1988–89 West Coast Conference men's basketball standings
	Conf.				Overall
Team	W		L	PCT	W		L	PCT
Saint Mary's	12	–	2	.857	25	–	5	.833
Pepperdine	10	–	4	.714	20	–	13	.606
Loyola Marymount †	10	–	4	.714	20	–	11	.645
San Francisco	8	–	6	.571	16	–	12	.571
Santa Clara	7	–	7	.500	20	–	11	.645
Gonzaga	5	–	9	.357	14	–	14	.500
San Diego	2	–	12	.143	8	–	20	.286
Portland	2	–	12	.143	2	–	26	.071
† Conference tournament winner Rankings from AP poll

The 1988–89 Loyola Marymount Lions men's basketball team represented Loyola Marymount University during the 1988–89 NCAA Division I men's basketball season. The Lions were led by fourth-year head coach Paul Westhead. They played their home games at Gersten Pavilion in Los Angeles, California as members of the West Coast Conference.

LMU led the nation in scoring (112.5 points per game) for the second consecutive year. Junior All-American Hank Gathers became the second player in NCAA Division I history to lead the nation in scoring (32.7) and rebounding (13.7) in the same season.

== Roster ==
1988–89 Loyola Marymount Lions men's basketball team
Players
Coaches

Pos.	#	Name	Height	Weight	Year	Previous school	Hometown
C	00	Marcellus Lee	6 ft 10 in (2.08 m)	230 lb (104 kg)	Jr		Pomona, CA
F	4	Per Stumer	6 ft 7 in (2.01 m)	210 lb (95 kg)	So		Södertälje, Sweden
G	11	Tom Peabody	6 ft 3 in (1.91 m)	180 lb (82 kg)	So		Santa Ana, CA
G	12	Tony Walker	6 ft 1 in (1.85 m)	—	So		Riverside, CA
F	14	John O'Connell	6 ft 6 in (1.98 m)	205 lb (93 kg)	Fr		Glenside, PA
G	20	Terrell Lowery	6 ft 2 in (1.88 m)	160 lb (73 kg)	Fr	Oakland Technical HS	Oakland, CA
G	21	Jeff Fryer	6 ft 2 in (1.88 m)	180 lb (82 kg)	Jr	Corona del Mar HS	Newport Beach, CA
F	23	Jeff Roscoe	6 ft 9 in (2.06 m)	210 lb (95 kg)	Jr		Puyallup, WA
G	30	Bo Kimble	6 ft 4 in (1.93 m)	190 lb (86 kg)	Jr	Dobbins Technical HS/USC	Philadelphia, PA
G	32	Enoch Simmons	6 ft 4 in (1.93 m)	205 lb (93 kg)	Sr
C	34	Chris Knight	6 ft 9 in (2.06 m)	—	Fr		Los Angeles, CA
F	44	Hank Gathers	6 ft 7 in (2.01 m)	210 lb (95 kg)	Jr	Dobbins Technical HS/USC	Philadelphia, PA
F	50	Marcus Slater	6 ft 8 in (2.03 m)	190 lb (86 kg)	So		Carson, CA

Head coach

- Paul Westhead (Saint Joseph's)

Assistant coach(es)

- Jay Hillock (Gonzaga)
- Judas Prada
- Bruce Woods
- Jim Ellis

Legend

- (C) Team captain
- (S) Suspended
- (I) Ineligible
- (W) Walk-on
- Injured
- Current redshirt

Roster

== Schedule and results ==
Date time, TV	Rank^{#}	Opponent^{#}	Result	Record	High points	High rebounds	High assists	Site (attendance) city, state
Non-conference regular season
Nov 28, 1988*		Azusa Pacific	W 164–138	1–0	–	–	–	Gersten Pavilion (1,897); Los Angeles, CA
Dec 1, 1988*		at UC Santa Barbara	L 94–95	1–1	–	–	–	(6,000); Santa Barbara, CA
Dec 7, 1988*		Oregon State	L 90–100	1–2	–	–	–	Gersten Pavilion (4,025); Los Angeles, CA
Dec 17, 1988*		at No. 7 Oklahoma	L 103–136	1–3	28 – Fryer, Simmons	18 – Gathers	9 – Lowery	Lloyd Noble Center (11,354); Norman, OK
Dec 22, 1988*		vs. Austin Peay; Old Style Classic	W 94–93	2–3	–	–	–	(5,358); Chicago, IL
Dec 23, 1988*		vs. DePaul; Old Style Classic	L 111–115	2–4	–	–	–	(7,433); Chicago, IL
Dec 28, 1988*		Marist	W 131–107	3–4	–	–	–	Gersten Pavilion (2,856); Los Angeles, CA
Dec 30, 1988*		at Nevada	W 130–125	4–4	49 – Gathers	26 – Gathers	–	Lawlor Events Center (7,640); Reno, NV
Jan 2, 1989*		Wisconsin–Green Bay	W 85–83	5–4	–	–	–	Gersten Pavilion (2,280); Los Angeles, CA
Jan 4, 1989*		Xavier	L 113–118	5–5	–	–	–	Gersten Pavilion (3,175); Los Angeles, CA
Jan 7, 1989*		at U.S. International	W 162–144	6–5	40 – Gathers	23 – Gathers	7 – Fryer	Golden Hall (1,136); San Diego, CA
WCC regular season
Jan 11, 1989		San Francisco	W 113–95	7–5 (1–0)	–	–	–	Gersten Pavilion (3,286); Los Angeles, CA
Jan 12, 1989		Santa Clara	W 87–80	8–5 (2–0)	–	–	–	Gersten Pavilion (4,053); Los Angeles, CA
Jan 14, 1989*		at DePaul	L 108–122	8–6	–	–	–	Rosemont Horizon (9,656); Rosemont, IL
Jan 20, 1989		at Gonzaga	W 113–104	9–6 (3–0)	–	–	–	Martin Centre (4,000); Spokane, WA
Jan 21, 1989		at Portland	W 100–90	10–6 (4–0)	–	–	–	(2,316); Portland, OR
Jan 25, 1989		at Pepperdine	L 79–104	10–7 (4–1)	–	–	–	(3,367); Malibu, CA
Jan 29, 1989		Pepperdine	W 99–86	11–7 (5–1)	–	–	–	Gersten Pavilion (4,350); Los Angeles, CA
Jan 31, 1989*		U.S. International	W 181–150	12–7	41 – Gathers	29 – Gathers	13 – Lowery	Gersten Pavilion (2,661); Los Angeles, CA
Feb 3, 1989		Saint Mary's	L 104–116	12–8 (5–2)	–	–	–	Gersten Pavilion (4,366); Los Angeles, CA
Feb 4, 1989		San Diego	W 139–104	13–8 (6–2)	–	–	–	Gersten Pavilion (4,085); Los Angeles, CA
Feb 18, 1989		Gonzaga	W 147–136	16–9 (9–3)	40 – Gathers, Kimble	13 – Gathers	11 – Simmons	Gersten Pavilion (3,763); Los Angeles, CA
Feb 24, 1990		at Santa Clara	W 112–101	17–9 (10–3)	32 – Fryer, Gathers	15 – Gathers	8 – Simmons	Leavey Center (5,000); Santa Clara, CA
Feb 25, 1989		at San Francisco	L 109–123	17–10 (10–4)	34 – Gathers	12 – Gathers	3 – 3 tied	War Memorial Gymnasium (5,220); San Francisco, CA
WCAC Tournament
Mar 4, 1989*	(3)	vs. (6) Gonzaga; Quarterfinals	W 101–98	18–10	31 – Gathers	12 – Gathers	6 – Simmons	War Memorial Gymnasium (5,300); San Francisco, CA
Mar 5, 1989*	(3)	vs. (2) Pepperdine; Semifinals	W 112–98	19–10	29 – Simmons	11 – Gathers	6 – Simmons	War Memorial Gymnasium (5,465); San Francisco, CA
Mar 6, 1989*	(3)	vs. (5) Santa Clara; Championship Game	W 75–70 ^{OT}	20–10	30 – Gathers	16 – Gathers	3 – 2 tied	War Memorial Gymnasium (5,330); San Francisco, CA
NCAA Tournament
Mar 16, 1989*; CBS	(12 MW)	vs. (5 MW) No. 23 Arkansas; First round	L 101–120	20–11	28 – Gathers	17 – Gathers	4 – Peabody	Hoosier Dome (37,232); Indianapolis, IN
*Non-conference game. ^{#}Rankings from AP Poll. (#) Tournament seedings in parentheses.

== Awards ==
All-Americans

- Hank Gathers – 3rd Team (AP, UPI), 2nd Team (USBWA)

NCAA Scoring Leader

- Hank Gathers – 32.7 PPG

NCAA Rebounding Leader

- Hank Gathers – 13.7 PPG

WCC Player of the Year

- Hank Gathers

WCC tournament MVP

- Hank Gathers

== Records ==
Season

Team

- Points, Both Teams – 331 vs. U.S. International (January 31, 1989)
- Field Goals, Both Teams – 130 vs. U.S. International (January 31, 1989)
- Field Goal Attempts, Both Teams – 245 vs. U.S. International (January 31, 1989)
- Points in a Half, Both Teams – 172 vs. Gonzaga (February 18, 1989)
