= 1988–89 Washington State Cougars men's basketball team =

American college basketball season

1988–89 Washington State Cougars men's basketball
- Conference: Pacific-10
- Record: 10–19 (4–14 Pac-10)
- Head coach: Kelvin Sampson (2nd season)
- Assistant coaches: Dave Harshman; Kim Motta
- Home arena: Beasley Coliseum

1988–89 Pacific-10 Conference men's basketball standings
	Conf.				Overall
Team	W		L	PCT	W		L	PCT
No. 1 Arizona †	17	–	1	.944	29	–	4	.879
No. 13 Stanford	15	–	3	.833	26	–	7	.788
UCLA	13	–	5	.722	21	–	10	.677
Oregon State	13	–	5	.722	22	–	8	.733
California	10	–	8	.556	20	–	13	.606
Washington	8	–	10	.444	12	–	16	.429
Arizona State	5	–	13	.278	12	–	16	.429
Washington State	4	–	14	.222	10	–	19	.345
Oregon	3	–	15	.167	8	–	21	.276
USC	2	–	16	.111	10	–	22	.313
† Conference tournament winner As of April 15, 1989; Rankings from AP poll

The 1988–89 Washington State Cougars men's basketball team represented Washington State University for the 1988–89 NCAA Division I men's basketball season. Led by second-year head coach Kelvin Sampson, the Cougars were members of the Pacific-10 Conference and played their home games on campus at Beasley Coliseum in Pullman, Washington.

The Cougars were 9–18 overall in the regular season and 4–14 in conference play, eighth in the standings.

At the conference tournament, the Cougars defeated ninth seed Oregon by 22 points in the first round. In the quarterfinal against top-ranked Arizona, the Cougars fell by eight points.

== Postseason results ==
Date time, TV	Rank^{#}	Opponent^{#}	Result	Record	Site (attendance) city, state
Pacific-10 Tournament
Thu, March 9; 7:00 pm	(8)	vs. (9) Oregon; First round	W 78–56	10–18	Great Western Forum (4,830); Inglewood, California
Fri, March 10; 3:00 pm	(8)	vs. (1) No. 1 Arizona; Quarterfinal	L 54–62	10–19	Great Western Forum (7,195); Inglewood, California
*Non-conference game. ^{#}Rankings from AP poll. (#) Tournament seedings in parentheses. All times are in Pacific time.
