= 1988–89 Stanford Cardinal men's basketball team =

American college basketball season

1988–89 Stanford Cardinal men's basketball

1989 NCAA Division I men's basketball tournament, first round
- Conference: Pacific-10 Conference

Ranking
- Coaches: No. 12
- AP: No. 13
- Record: 26–7 (15–3 Pac-10)
- Head coach: Mike Montgomery (3rd season)
- Assistant coaches: Barry Collier; Doug Oliver
- Home arena: Maples Pavilion (Capacity: 7,392)

1988–89 Pacific-10 Conference men's basketball standings
	Conf.				Overall
Team	W		L	PCT	W		L	PCT
No. 1 Arizona †	17	–	1	.944	29	–	4	.879
No. 13 Stanford	15	–	3	.833	26	–	7	.788
UCLA	13	–	5	.722	21	–	10	.677
Oregon State	13	–	5	.722	22	–	8	.733
California	10	–	8	.556	20	–	13	.606
Washington	8	–	10	.444	12	–	16	.429
Arizona State	5	–	13	.278	12	–	16	.429
Washington State	4	–	14	.222	10	–	19	.345
Oregon	3	–	15	.167	8	–	21	.276
USC	2	–	16	.111	10	–	22	.313
† Conference tournament winner As of April 15, 1989; Rankings from AP poll

The 1988–89 Stanford Cardinal men's basketball team represented Stanford University as a member of the Pacific-10 Conference during the 1988–89 NCAA Division I men's basketball season.

== Roster ==
1988–89 Stanford Cardinal men's basketball team
Players
Coaches

Pos.	#	Name	Height	Weight	Year	Previous school	Hometown
G	11	John Patrick	6 ft 4 in (1.93 m)	—	So	Sidwell Friends School	Vienna, VA
G	14	Oliver Cunningham	6 ft 4 in (1.93 m)	—	Jr		Diamond Bar, CA
G	20	Scott Meinert	6 ft 2 in (1.88 m)	—	RS Sr	South Salem High School	Salem, OR
G	21	Terry Taylor	6 ft 2 in (1.88 m)	—	Sr		Aurora, CO
F	23	Bryan McSweeney	6 ft 6 in (1.98 m)	—	Sr		Dana Point, CA
F	30	Andrew Vlahov	6 ft 7 in (2.01 m)	238 lb (108 kg)	So	South Eugene High School	Perth, Western Australia
F	31	Adam Keefe	6 ft 9 in (2.06 m)	220 lb (100 kg)	Fr	Woodbridge High School	Irvine, CA
F	32	Howard Wright	6 ft 8 in (2.03 m)	220 lb (100 kg)	Sr	Patrick Henry High School	San Diego, CA
F	34	Deshon Wingate	6 ft 7 in (2.01 m)	—	So		Austin TX
G	42	Todd Lichti	6 ft 4 in (1.93 m)	200 lb (91 kg)	Sr	Mount Diablo High School	Walnut Creek, CA
C	45	Derek Bruton	6 ft 10 in (2.08 m)	—	Jr	Gilroy High School	Gilroy, CA
F	50	Lang Meyer (redshirt)	6 ft 9 in (2.06 m)	—	Fr		The Woodlands, TX
C	55	Eric Reveno	6 ft 8 in (2.03 m)	—	RS Sr	Menlo School	Stanford, CA

Head coach

- Mike Montgomery (Colorado State)

Assistant coach(es)

- Barry Collier (Butler)
- Doug Oliver (San José State)

Legend

- (C) Team captain
- (S) Suspended
- (I) Ineligible
- (W) Walk-on
- Injured
- Current redshirt

Roster

== Schedule and results ==
Date time, TV	Rank^{#}	Opponent^{#}	Result	Record	Site (attendance) city, state
Non-conference regular season
Nov 18, 1988*	No. 20	at Montana; Preseason NIT	W 79–63	1–0	Harry Adams Field House; Missoula, Montana
Nov 20, 1988*	No. 20	at Indiana; Preseason NIT	L 73–84	1–1	Assembly Hall; Bloomington, Indiana
Nov 28, 1988*		at No. 5 North Carolina	L 76–87	1–2	Dean Smith Center; Chapel Hill, North Carolina
Dec 2, 1988*		Cornell; Apple Invitational	W 90–45	2–2	Maples Pavilion; Stanford, California
Dec 3, 1988*		Colorado State; Apple Invitational	W 63–49	3–2	Maples Pavilion; Stanford, California
Dec 10, 1988*		San Jose State	W 89–39	4–2	Maples Pavilion; Stanford, California
Dec 17, 1988		Oregon State	W 87–59	5–2 (1–0)	Maples Pavilion; Stanford, California
Dec 23, 1988		at UCLA	L 70–74	5–3 (1–1)	Pauley Pavilion; Los Angeles, California
Dec 27, 1988*		at Saint Mary's	W 65–64	6–3	McKeon Pavilion; Moraga, California
Dec 29, 1988*		vs. Furman; Music City Invitational	W 88–71	7–3	Memorial Gymnasium; Nashville, Tennessee
Dec 30, 1988*		at Vanderbilt; Music City Invitational	W 89–68	8–3	Memorial Gymnasium; Nashville, Tennessee
Jan 5, 1989		No. 8 Arizona	W 83–78	9–3 (2–1)	Maples Pavilion; Stanford, California
Jan 7, 1989		Arizona State	W 94–65	10–3 (3–1)	Maples Pavilion; Stanford, California
Jan 12, 1989		at Washington	W 71–69	11–3 (4–1)	Bank of America Arena; Seattle, Washington
Jan 14, 1989		at Washington State	W 85–43	12–3 (5–1)	Friel Court; Pullman, Washington
Jan 16, 1989*	No. 20	Miami (FL)	W 93–59	13–3	Maples Pavilion; Stanford, California
Jan 19, 1989	No. 20	at California	L 64–75	13–4 (5–2)	Harmon Gym; Berkeley, California
Jan 21, 1989	No. 20	UCLA	W 84–75	14–4 (6–2)	Maples Pavilion; Stanford, California
Jan 26, 1989*	No. 19	Oregon	W 75–53	15–4 (7–2)	Maples Pavilion; Stanford, California
Jan 29, 1989	No. 19	at No. 6 Arizona	L 52–72	15–5 (7–3)	McKale Center; Tucson, Arizona
Feb 2, 1989*	No. 20	at Arizona State	W 75–60	16–5 (8–3)	Wells Fargo Arena; Tempe, Arizona
Feb 4, 1989*	No. 20	vs. Florida	W 84–69	17–5	Orlando, Florida
Feb 9, 1989	No. 18	Washington State	W 65–53	18–5 (9–3)	Maples Pavilion; Stanford, California
Feb 12, 1989	No. 18	Washington	W 82–74	19–5 (10–3)	Maples Pavilion; Stanford, California
Feb 16, 1989	No. 17	California	W 97–71	20–5 (11–3)	Maples Pavilion; Stanford, California
Feb 20, 1989	No. 17	at USC	W 68–52	21–5 (12–3)	L.A. Sports Arena; Los Angeles, California
Feb 23, 1989	No. 16	at Oregon	W 54–50	22–5 (13–3)	McArthur Court; Eugene, Oregon
Feb 25, 1989	No. 16	at Oregon State	W 60–58	23–5 (14–3)	Gill Coliseum; Corvallis, Oregon
Mar 2, 1989	No. 13	USC	W 73–65	24–5 (15–3)	Maples Pavilion; Stanford, California
Pac-10 Tournament
Mar 10, 1989*	(2) No. 12	vs. (10) USC; Quarterfinals	W 66–61	25–5	The Forum; Los Angeles, California
Mar 11, 1989*	(2) No. 12	vs. (3) UCLA; Semifinals	W 95–86	26–5	The Forum; Los Angeles, California
Mar 12, 1989*	(2) No. 12	vs. (1) No. 1 Arizona; Championship	L 51–73	26–6	The Forum; Los Angeles, California
NCAA Tournament
Mar 16, 1989*	(3 E) No. 13	vs. (14 E) Siena; First Round	L 78–80	26–7	Greensboro Coliseum; Greensboro, North Carolina
*Non-conference game. ^{#}Rankings from AP Poll. (#) Tournament seedings in parentheses.

== Rankings ==
Ranking movements Legend: ██ Increase in ranking ██ Decrease in ranking
	Week																		
Poll	Pre	1	2	3	4	5	6	7	8	9	10	11	12	13	14	15	16	17	Final
AP	20	20*									20	19	20	18	17	16	13	12	13
Coaches	19	19*	19							18	18	18	18	16	17	13	12	12	Not released

*Both polls did not release a week 1 poll.
