= 1988–89 UC Irvine Anteaters men's basketball team =

American college basketball season

1988–89 UC Irvine Anteaters men's basketball
- Conference: Big West Conference
- Record: 12–17 (8–10 BWC)
- Head coach: Bill Mulligan (9th season)
- Home arena: Bren Events Center

1988–89 Big West men's basketball standings
	Conf.				Overall
Team	W		L	PCT	W		L	PCT
No. 15 UNLV †	16	–	2	.889	29	–	8	.784
New Mexico State	12	–	6	.667	21	–	11	.656
UC Santa Barbara	11	–	7	.611	21	–	9	.700
Cal State Fullerton	10	–	8	.556	16	–	13	.552
Long Beach State	10	–	8	.556	13	–	15	.464
Utah State	10	–	8	.556	12	–	16	.429
Fresno State	9	–	9	.500	15	–	14	.517
UC Irvine	8	–	10	.444	12	–	17	.414
Pacific	3	–	15	.167	7	–	21	.250
San Jose State	1	–	17	.056	5	–	23	.179
† 1989 Big West tournament winner Rankings from AP poll

The 1988–89 UC Irvine Anteaters men's basketball team represented the University of California, Irvine during the 1988–89 NCAA Division I men's basketball season. The Anteaters were led by ninth year head coach Bill Mulligan and played at the Bren Events Center. They were members of the Pacific Coast Athletic Association. They finished the season 12–17, 8–10 in PCAA play.

== Previous season ==
The 1987–88 UC Irvine Anteaters men's basketball team finished the season with a record of 16–14, 9–9 in PCAA play and reached the PCAA Tournament finals for the first time in program history. On July 1, 1988, the Pacific Coast Athletic Association officially re-branded as the Big West Conference.

== Roster ==
1988–89 UC Irvine Anteaters men's basketball team
Players
Coaches

Pos.	#	Name	Height	Weight	Year	Hometown
F		Justin Anderson	6 ft 5 in (1.96 m)	—	So
C		Ricky Butler	6 ft 7 in (2.01 m)	—	So
C		Mike Doktorczyk	6 ft 9 in (2.06 m)	—	Jr
F	22	Rob Doktorczyk	6 ft 9 in (2.06 m)	175 lb (79 kg)	Jr	San Pedro, CA
G		Kevin Floyd	6 ft 5 in (1.96 m)	—	Sr
F		Jeff Herdman	6 ft 7 in (2.01 m)	—	So
F		Mike Labat	—	—	Jr
C		Brian McCloskey	6 ft 7 in (2.01 m)	—	Fr
G		Rod Palmer	6 ft 3 in (1.91 m)	—	Jr
F		Elgin Rogers	6 ft 6 in (1.98 m)	—	Fr
G		Abraham Tang	6 ft 0 in (1.83 m)	—	Fr
G		Etop Udo-Ema	6 ft 4 in (1.93 m)	—	Fr
G		Troy Whiteto	6 ft 2 in (1.88 m)	—	Jr

Head coach

Bill Mulligan

Assistant coach(es)

Legend

- (C) Team captain
- (S) Suspended
- (I) Ineligible
- (W) Walk-on
- Injured
- Current redshirt

Roster
Last update: September 21, 2017

== Schedule ==
Date time, TV	Rank^{#}	Opponent^{#}	Result	Record	Site (attendance) city, state
Regular Season
November 25, 1988*		Georgia State; Western Digital Freedom Bowl Classic	L 84–109	0–1	Bren Events Center (2,400); Irvine, CA
November 26, 1988*		TCU; Western Digital Freedom Bowl Classic	W 83–75	1–1	Bren Events Center (1,673); Irvine, CA
November 30, 1988*		San Francisco	W 83–75	1–2	Bren Events Center (2,073); Irvine, CA
December 2, 1988*		at San Diego State	L 88–102	1–3	Peterson Gym (3,529); San Diego, CA
December 10, 1988*		Pepperdine	L 76–102	1–4	Bren Events Center (2,836); Irvine, CA
December 13, 1988*		Eastern Washington	W 112–101	2–4	Bren Events Center (1,219); Irvine, CA
December 15, 1988		at No. 13 UNLV	L 85–100	2–5 (0–1)	Thomas & Mack Center (17,453); Paradise, NV
December 18, 1988*		at Loyola–Chicago	L 94–99	2–6	Alumni Gym (1,218); Chicago, IL
December 21, 1988*		at Virginia	L 89–99 ^{OT}	2–7	University Hall (8,264); Charlottesville, CA
December 28, 1988*		UCLA	W 91–90	3–7	Bren Events Center (5,000); Irvine, CA
January 7, 1989		at UC Santa Barbara	L 79–95	3–8 (0–2)	UC Santa Barbara Events Center (6,000); Santa Barbara, CA
January 14, 1989		at San Jose State	W 71–62	4–8 (1–2)	San Jose Civic Auditorium (1,166); San Jose, CA
January 16, 1989		at Utah State	L 71–104	4–9 (1–3)	Smith Spectrum (9,948); Logan, UT
January 19, 1989		Fresno State	W 64–61	5–9 (2–3)	Bren Events Center (2,946); Irvine, CA
January 21, 1989		Pacific	W 64–61	6–9 (3–3)	Bren Events Center (2,287); Irvine, CA
January 26, 1989		at New Mexico State	L 69–90	6–10 (3–4)	Pan American Center (5,518); Las Cruces, NM
January 28, 1989		at Long Beach State	L 70–75	6–11 (3–5)	Gold Mine (1,900); Long Beach, CA
February 2, 1989		at Cal State Fullerton	W 77–73	7–11 (4–5)	Titan Gym (3,202); Fullerton, CA
February 4, 1989		No. 16 UNLV	W 99–98	8–11 (5–5)	Bren Events Center (5,000); Irvine, CA
February 9, 1989		San Jose State	W 91–69	9–11 (6–5)	Bren Events Center (2,279); Irvine, CA
February 11, 1989		Cal State Fullerton	L 75–78	9–12 (6–6)	Bren Events Center (4,718); Irvine, CA
February 16, 1989		at Pacific	W 95–92 ^{OT}	10–12 (7–6)	Alex G. Spanos Center (2,441); Stockton, CA
February 18, 1989		at Fresno State	W 82–79	11–12 (8–6)	Selland Arena (10,159); Fresno, CA
February 23, 1989		Long Beach State	L 67–72	11–13 (8–7)	Bren Events Center (3,223); Irvine, CA
February 25, 1989		New Mexico State	L 69–72	11–14 (8–8)	Bren Events Center (2,855); Irvine, CA
March 2, 1989		Utah State	L 94–95 ^{OT}	11–15 (8–9)	Bren Events Center (3,361); Irvine, CA
March 4, 1989		UC Santa Barbara	L 70–78	11–16 (8–10)	Bren Events Center (5,000); Irvine, CA
Big West Conference tournament
March 8, 1989		vs. Pacific; First Round	W 68–62	12–16	Long Beach Arena (5,533); Long Beach, CA
March 9, 1989		vs. No. 18 UNLV; Quarterfinals	L 82–102	12–17	Long Beach Arena (7,242); Long Beach, CA
*Non-conference game. ^{#}Rankings from AP Poll. (#) Tournament seedings in parentheses. All times are in Pacific Time.

== Awards and honors ==
- Mike Doktorczyk
  - Big West Second Team All-Conference
