= 1988–89 UCLA Bruins men's basketball team =

American college basketball season

1988–89 UCLA Bruins men's basketball

NCAA tournament, Round of 32
- Conference: Pacific-10
- Record: 21–10 (13–5, T-3rd Pac-10)
- Head coach: Jim Harrick (1st season)
- Assistant coaches: Brad Holland; Mark Gottfried; Paul Landreaux
- Home arena: Pauley Pavilion

1988–89 Pacific-10 Conference men's basketball standings
	Conf.				Overall
Team	W		L	PCT	W		L	PCT
No. 1 Arizona †	17	–	1	.944	29	–	4	.879
No. 13 Stanford	15	–	3	.833	26	–	7	.788
UCLA	13	–	5	.722	21	–	10	.677
Oregon State	13	–	5	.722	22	–	8	.733
California	10	–	8	.556	20	–	13	.606
Washington	8	–	10	.444	12	–	16	.429
Arizona State	5	–	13	.278	12	–	16	.429
Washington State	4	–	14	.222	10	–	19	.345
Oregon	3	–	15	.167	8	–	21	.276
USC	2	–	16	.111	10	–	22	.313
† Conference tournament winner As of April 15, 1989; Rankings from AP poll

The 1988–89 UCLA Bruins men's basketball team represented the University of California, Los Angeles in the 1988–89 NCAA Division I men's basketball season. Jim Harrick began his first year as head coach for the Bruins, being the 6th coach since the legendary John Wooden. The Bruins were ranked as high as 20th in the AP Poll during the season. The Bruins finished tied for third place in the Pac-10. They went on to the NCAA tournament where they advanced to the second round before losing to North Carolina 88–81.

== Starting lineup ==
Position	Player	Class
F	Trevor Wilson	Jr.
F	Don MacLean	Fr.
C	Kevin Walker	Jr.
G	Pooh Richardson	Sr.
G	Darrick Martin	Fr.

== Roster ==
1988–89 UCLA Bruins men's basketball team
Players
Coaches

Pos.	#	Name	Height	Weight	Year	Hometown
G	20	Jeff Bronner	6 ft 3 in (1.91 m)	—	Fr
F	43	Steve Brumbach	6 ft 6 in (1.98 m)	—	Sr
G	21	Darrin Dafney	6 ft 4 in (1.93 m)	—	Fr
F	42	Don MacLean	6 ft 10 in (2.08 m)	—	Fr	Palo Alto, California
G	15	Darrick Martin	5 ft 11 in (1.8 m)	—	Fr	Denver, Colorado
C	25	Keith Owens	6 ft 7 in (2.01 m)	—	So	San Francisco, California
G	24	Pooh Richardson (C)	6 ft 1 in (1.85 m)	—	Sr	Philadelphia, Pennsylvania
F	45	Charles Rochelin	6 ft 7 in (2.01 m)	—	Sr
C	50	Kevin Walker	6 ft 10 in (2.08 m)	—	Jr
G	11	Kevin Williams	6 ft 2 in (1.88 m)	—	So
F	4	Trevor Wilson	6 ft 8 in (2.03 m)	—	Jr	Los Angeles, California

Head coach

- Jim Harrick (Morris Harvey College)

Assistant coach(es)

- Brad Holland (UCLA)
- Mark Gottfried (Alabama)
- Paul Landreaux (CSULA)

Legend

- (C) Team captain
- (S) Suspended
- (I) Ineligible
- (W) Walk-on
- Injured
- Current redshirt

Roster

== Schedule ==
Date time, TV	Rank^{#}	Opponent^{#}	Result	Record	High points	High rebounds	High assists	Site (attendance) city, state
Regular Season
November 26, 1988		Texas Tech	W 84–62	1–0	22 – D. MacLean	10 – T. Wilson	8 – P. Richardson	Pauley Pavilion (5,866); Los Angeles, CA
December 1, 1988		at Miami (FL)	W 91–66	2–0	–	–	–	Miami Arena (6,023); Miami, FL
December 3, 1988		at BYU	W 97–87	3–0	–	–	–	Marriott Center (20,303); Provo, UT
December 7, 1988		Boston University	W 85–74	4–0	–	–	–	Pauley Pavilion (7,421); Los Angeles, CA
December 17, 1988		at No. 8 North Carolina	L 78–104	4–1	–	–	–	Dean Smith Center (20,712); Chapel Hill, NC
December 21, 1988	No. 20	California	W 76–59	5–1 (1–0)	–	–	–	Pauley Pavilion (11,831); Los Angeles, CA
December 23, 1988	No. 20	Stanford	W 74–70	6–1 (2–0)	–	–	–	Pauley Pavilion (10,427); Los Angeles, CA
December 28, 1988		at UC Irvine	L 90–91	6–2	–	–	–	Bren Events Center (5,000); Irvine, CA
December 30, 1988		North Texas	W 99–84	7–2	–	–	–	Pauley Pavilion (6,261); Los Angeles, CA
January 5, 1989		at Oregon	W 97–66	8–2 (3–0)	–	–	–	McArthur Court (8,244); Eugene, OR
January 8, 1989		at Oregon State	L 69–82	8–3 (3–1)	–	–	–	Gill Coliseum (10,785); Corvallis, OR
January 12, 1989		at USC	W 67–66	9–3 (4–1)	–	–	–	Los Angeles Memorial Sports Arena (6,319); Los Angeles, CA
January 14, 1989		Notre Dame	L 79–82	9–4	–	–	–	Pauley Pavilion (11,847); Los Angeles, CA
January 19, 1989		Arizona State	W 94–84	10–4 (5–1)	–	–	–	Pauley Pavilion (5,896); Los Angeles, CA
January 21, 1989		at No. 20 Stanford	L 75–84	10–5 (5–2)	–	–	–	Maples Pavilion (7,500); Stanford, CA
January 26, 1989		at Washington State	W 64–63	11–5 (6–2)	–	–	–	Beasley Coliseum (4,040); Pullman, WA
January 28, 1989		at Washington	W 93–74	12–5 (7–2)	–	–	–	Hec Edmundson Pavilion (3,551); Seattle, WA
February 2, 1989		Oregon	W 80–74	13–5 (8–2)	–	–	–	Pauley Pavilion (6,422); Los Angeles, CA
February 5, 1989		Oregon State	W 92–75	14–5 (9–2)	–	–	–	Pauley Pavilion (8,636); Los Angeles, CA
February 8, 1989		USC	W 68–65	15–5 (10–2)	–	–	–	Pauley Pavilion (10,062); Los Angeles, CA
February 12, 1989		No. 4 Louisville	W 77–75	16–5	–	–	–	Pauley Pavilion (12,547); Los Angeles, CA
February 16, 1989		at Arizona State	L 86–93	16–6 (10–3)	–	–	–	ASU Activity Center (4,844); Tempe, AZ
February 18, 1989		at No. 2 Arizona	L 64–102	16–7 (10–4)	–	–	–	McKale Center (13,641); Tucson, AZ
February 23, 1989		Washington	W 101–78	17–7 (11–4)	–	–	–	Pauley Pavilion (5,276); Los Angeles, CA
February 26, 1989		Washington State	W 56–55	18–7 (12–4)	–	–	–	Pauley Pavilion (4,637); Los Angeles, CA
March 2, 1989		at California	W 81–73	19–7 (13–4)	–	–	–	Harmon Gym (6,578); Berkeley, CA
March 4, 1989		No. 1 Arizona	L 86–89	19–8 (13–5)	–	–	–	Pauley Pavilion (12,729); Los Angeles, CA
Pac-10 Tournament
March 10, 1989		vs. Washington; Quarterfinals	W 64–54	20–8	–	–	–	The Forum (7,195); Los Angeles, CA
March 11, 1989		vs. No. 12 Stanford; Semifinals	L 86–95	20–9	–	–	–	The Forum (10,565); Los Angeles, CA
NCAA tournament
March 17, 1989		vs. Iowa State; First Round	W 84–74	21–9	–	–	–	Omni Coliseum (12,297); Atlanta, GA
March 19, 1989		vs. No. 5 North Carolina; Second Round	L 81–88	21–10	–	–	–	Omni Coliseum (12,821); Atlanta, GA
*Non-conference game. ^{#}Rankings from AP Poll. (#) Tournament seedings in parentheses. All times are in Pacific Time.

== Notes ==
- This was the second time UCLA had faced the North Carolina Tarheels in the NCAA Tournament. The previous encounter was in the 1968 Final Four Championship game (Los Angeles). The Bruins won out the first time, 78-55.
