= 1989 West Coast Athletic Conference men's basketball tournament =

- Classification: Division I
- Season: 1988–89
- Teams: 8
- Site: War Memorial Gymnasium; San Francisco, CA
- Champions: Loyola Marymount (2nd title)
- Winning coach: Paul Westhead (2nd title)
- MVP: Hank Gathers (Loyola Marymount)
- West Coast Athletic Conference men's basketball tournaments

1988–89 West Coast Conference men's basketball standings
	Conf.				Overall
Team	W		L	PCT	W		L	PCT
Saint Mary's	12	–	2	.857	25	–	5	.833
Pepperdine	10	–	4	.714	20	–	13	.606
Loyola Marymount †	10	–	4	.714	20	–	11	.645
San Francisco	8	–	6	.571	16	–	12	.571
Santa Clara	7	–	7	.500	20	–	11	.645
Gonzaga	5	–	9	.357	14	–	14	.500
San Diego	2	–	12	.143	8	–	20	.286
Portland	2	–	12	.143	2	–	26	.071
† Conference tournament winner Rankings from AP poll

The 1989 West Coast Athletic Conference men's basketball tournament was held March 4–6 at War Memorial Gymnasium on the campus of the University of San Francisco in San Francisco, California. This was the third edition of the tournament and the last as the WCAC; the conference name was shortened to "West Coast Conference" (WCC) that summer.

The fourth-seed and host Dons lost in the quarterfinals and the top two seeds were defeated in the semifinals. Third-seeded Loyola Marymount defeated #5 seed Santa Clara 75–70 (in overtime) in the title game to repeat as WCAC tournament champions.

The Lions earned the automatic bid to the 64-team NCAA tournament and were seeded twelfth in the Midwest regional. Regular-season champion Saint Mary's received an at-large bid and were the eighth seed in the West regional; both WCAC teams lost in the first round.

== Bracket ==
* – Denotes overtime period

Quarterfinals; Saturday, March 4
1	Saint Mary's	86
8	Portland	48
5	Santa Clara	69
4	San Francisco	64
3	Loyola Marymount	101
6	Gonzaga	98
7	San Diego	69
2	Pepperdine	72

Semifinals; Sunday, March 5
1	Saint Mary's	61
5	Santa Clara	63
3	Loyola Marymount	112
2	Pepperdine	98

Championship; Monday, March 6
5	Santa Clara	70
3	Loyola Marymount	75*
