= 1989 Big West Conference men's basketball tournament =

- Classification: Division I
- Season: 1988–89
- Teams: 10
- Site: Long Beach Arena; Long Beach, CA
- Champions: UNLV (5th title)
- Winning coach: Jerry Tarkanian (5th title)
- MVP: Stacey Augmon (UNLV)

1988–89 Big West men's basketball standings
	Conf.				Overall
Team	W		L	PCT	W		L	PCT
No. 15 UNLV †	16	–	2	.889	29	–	8	.784
New Mexico State	12	–	6	.667	21	–	11	.656
UC Santa Barbara	11	–	7	.611	21	–	9	.700
Cal State Fullerton	10	–	8	.556	16	–	13	.552
Long Beach State	10	–	8	.556	13	–	15	.464
Utah State	10	–	8	.556	12	–	16	.429
Fresno State	9	–	9	.500	15	–	14	.517
UC Irvine	8	–	10	.444	12	–	17	.414
Pacific	3	–	15	.167	7	–	21	.250
San Jose State	1	–	17	.056	5	–	23	.179
† 1989 Big West tournament winner Rankings from AP poll

The 1989 Big West Conference men's basketball tournament was held March 8–11 at the Long Beach Arena in Long Beach, California. This was the first tournament after the Big West Conference renamed itself from the Pacific Coast Athletic Association (PCAA) in July 1988.

Top-seeded UNLV defeated New Mexico State in the final, 68–62, and captured their fifth PCAA/Big West championship. This was the Runnin' Rebels' fifth title in seven seasons.

The Rebels, in turn, received an automatic bid to the 1989 NCAA tournament, where they would advance to the Elite Eight.

== Format ==
There were no changes to the tournament format from 1988. All ten conference members participated in the field, with teams seeded in the bracket based on regular season conference records.

The top six seeds were given a bye into the quarterfinal round while the four lowest-seeded teams were placed into an initial preliminary round.

== Bracket ==
First round Wednesday, March 8
9	Pacific	62
8	UC Irvine	68
7	Fresno State	64
10	San José State	60

Quarterfinals; Thursday, March 9
1	#18 UNLV	102
8	UC Irvine	82
5	Cal State Fullerton	87
4	Utah State	86
3	UC Santa Barbara	87
6	Long Beach State	86
7	Fresno State	59
2	New Mexico State	60

Semifinals; Friday, March 10
1	#18 UNLV	99
5	Cal State Fullerton	83
3	UC Santa Barbara	63
2	New Mexico State	67

Championship; Saturday, March 11
1	#18 UNLV	68
2	New Mexico State	62
