= 1988–89 North Carolina Tar Heels men's basketball team =

American college basketball season

1988–89 North Carolina Tar Heels men's basketball

ACC tournament champion

NCAA tournament, Sweet 16
- Conference: Atlantic Coast Conference

Ranking
- Coaches: No. 4
- AP: No. 5
- Record: 29–8 (9–5 ACC)
- Head coach: Dean Smith (27th season)
- Assistant coaches: Bill Guthridge (21st season); Dick Harp (3rd season)
- Captains: Steve Bucknall; Jeff Lebo
- Home arena: Dean Smith Center

1988–89 ACC men's basketball standings
	Conf.				Overall
Team	W		L	PCT	W		L	PCT
No. 19 NC State	10	–	4	.714	22	–	9	.710
No. 9 Duke	9	–	5	.643	28	–	8	.778
Virginia	9	–	5	.643	22	–	11	.667
No. 5 North Carolina †	9	–	5	.643	29	–	8	.784
Georgia Tech	8	–	6	.571	20	–	12	.625
Clemson	7	–	7	.500	19	–	11	.633
Wake Forest	3	–	11	.214	13	–	15	.464
Maryland	1	–	13	.071	9	–	20	.310
† 1989 ACC tournament winner Rankings from AP Poll

The 1988–89 North Carolina Tar Heels men's basketball team represented the University of North Carolina at Chapel Hill.

Led by head coach Dean Smith, the Tar Heels won 29 games, achieved a top ten ranking, and reached the Sweet 16 in the NCAA tournament.

== Roster ==
1988–89 North Carolina Tar Heels men's basketball team
Players
Coaches

Pos.	#	Name	Height	Weight	Year	Hometown
G	3	Jeff Denny	6 ft 4 in (1.93 m)	—	Jr	Rural Hall, North Carolina
G	14	Jeff Lebo	6 ft 3 in (1.91 m)	180 lb (82 kg)	Sr	Carlisle, Pennsylvania
F	20	Steve Bucknall	6 ft 6 in (1.98 m)	215 lb (98 kg)	So	London, United Kingdom
G	21	King Rice	6 ft 0 in (1.83 m)	—	So	Binghamton, New York
G/F	22	Kevin Madden	6 ft 6 in (1.98 m)	—	Jr	Staunton, Virginia
F	31	David May	6 ft 7 in (2.01 m)	—	Sr	Greensboro, North Carolina
F	32	Pete Chilcutt	6 ft 9 in (2.06 m)	—	So	Eutaw, Alabama
F	34	J. R. Reid	6 ft 9 in (2.06 m)	247 lb (112 kg)	Jr	Virginia Beach, Virginia
G	40	Hubert Davis	6 ft 5 in (1.96 m)	183 lb (83 kg)	Fr	Burke, Virginia
C	42	Scott Williams	6 ft 11 in (2.11 m)	230 lb (104 kg)	Jr	Hacienda Heights, California
F	44	Rick Fox	6 ft 7 in (2.01 m)	—	So	Nassau, Bahamas
F/C	45	Marty Hensley	6 ft 11 in (2.11 m)	—	Jr	Marion, North Carolina
G/F	50	Bill Akins	6 ft 5 in (1.96 m)	—	Jr	Fuquay-Varina, North Carolina
C	54	John Greene	6 ft 10 in (2.08 m)	—	Jr	Raleigh, North Carolina

Head coach

- Dean Smith (Kansas)

Assistant coach(es)

- Bill Guthridge (Kansas State)

Legend

- (C) Team captain
- (S) Suspended
- (I) Ineligible
- (W) Walk-on
- Injured
- Current redshirt

== Schedule and results ==
Date time, TV	Rank^{#}	Opponent^{#}	Result	Record	Site (attendance) city, state
Regular Season
Nov 18, 1988*	No. 6	Chattanooga; Preseason NIT	W 111–84	1–0	Dean Smith Center; Chapel Hill, North Carolina
Nov 19, 1988*	No. 6	Georgia; Preseason NIT	W 99–91	2–0	Dean Smith Center; Chapel Hill, North Carolina
Nov 20, 1988*	No. 5	vs. No. 14 Missouri; Preseason NIT	L 81–91	2–1	Madison Square Garden; New York, New York
Nov 25, 1988*	No. 5	vs. No. 20 Indiana; Preseason NIT Consolation	W 106–92	3–1	Madison Square Garden; New York, New York
Nov 28, 1988*	No. 5	Stanford	W 87–76	4–1	Dean Smith Center; Chapel Hill, North Carolina
Dec 2, 1988*	No. 10	vs. No. 11 Arizona; Diet Pepsi Tournament of Champions	W 79–72	5–1	Charlotte Coliseum; Charlotte, North Carolina
Dec 3, 1988*	No. 10	vs. No. 8 Missouri; Diet Pepsi Tournament of Champions	W 76–60	6–1	Charlotte Coliseum; Charlotte, North Carolina
Dec 7, 1988*	No. 8	Vanderbilt	W 89–77	7–1	Dean Smith Center; Chapel Hill, North Carolina
Dec 10, 1988*	No. 8	vs. Richmond	W 76–68	8–1	Greensboro Coliseum; Greensboro, North Carolina
Dec 17, 1988*	No. 8	No. 20 UCLA	W 104–78	9–1	Dean Smith Center; Chapel Hill, North Carolina
Dec 22, 1988*	No. 8	vs. Towson State	W 102–74	10–1	HersheyPark Arena; Hershey, PA
Dec 29, 1988*	No. 7	at San Diego State	W 103–92	11–1	Peterson Gym; San Diego, California
Jan 3, 1989*	No. 6	at Pepperdine	W 102–80	12–1	Firestone Fieldhouse; Malibu, California
Jan 5, 1989*	No. 6	at DePaul	W 87–67	13–1	Rosemont Horizon; Rosemont, Illinois
Jan 7, 1989*	No. 6	No. 9 Iowa	L 97–98	13–2	Dean Smith Center; Chapel Hill, North Carolina
Jan 11, 1989	No. 8	Maryland	W 88–72	14–2 (1–0)	Dean Smith Center; Chapel Hill, North Carolina
Jan 15, 1989	No. 8	at Virginia	L 83–106	14–3 (1–1)	University Hall; Charlottesville, Virginia
Jan 18, 1989	No. 13	at No. 1 Duke	W 91–71	15–3 (2–1)	Cameron Indoor Stadium; Durham, North Carolina
Jan 21, 1989	No. 13	No. 15 NC State	W 84–81	16–3 (3–1)	Dean Smith Center; Chapel Hill, North Carolina
Jan 25, 1989	No. 7	at Wake Forest	W 88–74	17–3 (4–1)	Winston-Salem Memorial Coliseum; Winston-Salem, North Carolina
Jan 28, 1989	No. 7	Georgia Tech	W 92–85	18–3 (5–1)	Dean Smith Center; Chapel Hill, North Carolina
Feb 1, 1989	No. 3	at Clemson	L 82–85	18–4 (5–2)	Littlejohn Coliseum; Clemson, South Carolina
Feb 9, 1989	No. 6	at No. 17 NC State	L 88–98	18–5 (5–3)	Reynolds Coliseum; Raleigh, North Carolina
Feb 12, 1989	No. 6	Virginia	W 85–67	19–5 (6–3)	Dean Smith Center; Chapel Hill, North Carolina
Feb 14, 1989*	No. 8	at Old Dominion	W 87–77	20–5	Norfolk Scope; Norfolk, Virginia
Feb 16, 1989	No. 8	Wake Forest	W 99–76	21–5 (7–3)	Dean Smith Center; Chapel Hill, North Carolina
Feb 19, 1989	No. 8	at Maryland	W 86–75	22–5 (8–3)	Cole Fieldhouse; College Park, Maryland
Feb 21, 1989*	No. 5	Nevada	W 109–86	23–5	Dean Smith Center; Chapel Hill, North Carolina
Feb 25, 1989	No. 5	Clemson	W 100–86	24–5 (9–3)	Dean Smith Center; Chapel Hill, North Carolina
Mar 1, 1989	No. 5	at Georgia Tech	L 74–76	24–6 (9–4)	Alexander Memorial Coliseum; Atlanta, Georgia
Mar 5, 1989	No. 5	No. 9 Duke	L 86–88	24–7 (9–5)	Dean Smith Center; Chapel Hill, North Carolina
ACC Tournament
Mar 10, 1989*	No. 9	at Georgia Tech; ACC Tournament Quarterfinal	W 77–62	25–7	Omni Coliseum; Atlanta, Georgia
Mar 11, 1989*	No. 9	vs. Maryland; ACC Tournament Semifinal	W 88–58	26–7	Omni Coliseum; Atlanta, Georgia
Mar 12, 1989*	No. 9	vs. No. 7 Duke; ACC tournament championship	W 77–74	27–7	Omni Coliseum; Atlanta, Georgia
NCAA tournament
Mar 17, 1989*	(2 SE) No. 5	vs. (15 SE) Southern; First round	W 93–79	28–7	Omni Coliseum; Atlanta, Georgia
Mar 19, 1989*	(2 SE) No. 5	vs. (7 SE) UCLA; Second Round	W 88–81	29–7	Omni Coliseum; Atlanta, Georgia
Mar 23, 1989*	(2 SE) No. 5	vs. (3 SE) No. 10 Michigan; Southeast Regional semifinal – Sweet Sixteen	L 87–92	29–8	Rupp Arena; Lexington, Kentucky
*Non-conference game. ^{#}Rankings from AP Poll. (#) Tournament seedings in parentheses. SE=Southeast. All times are in Eastern Time.

== NBA draft ==
Round	Pick	Player	NBA club
1	5	J. R. Reid	Charlotte Hornets
