= 1988–89 Georgia Tech Yellow Jackets men's basketball team =

American college basketball season

1988–89 Georgia Tech Yellow Jackets men's basketball

NCAA tournament
- Conference: Atlantic Coast Conference
- Record: 20–12 (8–6 ACC)
- Head coach: Bobby Cremins (8th season)
- Assistant coaches: Kevin Cantwell (3rd season); Sherman Dillard (1st season); Jimmy Hebron (8th season)
- Home arena: Alexander Memorial Coliseum

1988–89 ACC men's basketball standings
	Conf.				Overall
Team	W		L	PCT	W		L	PCT
No. 19 NC State	10	–	4	.714	22	–	9	.710
No. 9 Duke	9	–	5	.643	28	–	8	.778
Virginia	9	–	5	.643	22	–	11	.667
No. 5 North Carolina †	9	–	5	.643	29	–	8	.784
Georgia Tech	8	–	6	.571	20	–	12	.625
Clemson	7	–	7	.500	19	–	11	.633
Wake Forest	3	–	11	.214	13	–	15	.464
Maryland	1	–	13	.071	9	–	20	.310
† 1989 ACC tournament winner Rankings from AP Poll

The 1988–89 Georgia Tech Yellow Jackets men's basketball team represented Georgia Institute of Technology during the 1988–89 NCAA Division I men's basketball season.

== Roster ==
1988–89 Georgia Tech Yellow Jackets men's basketball team
Players
Coaches

Pos.	#	Name	Height	Weight	Year	Hometown
G/F	4	Dennis Scott	6 ft 8 in (2.03 m)	225 lb (102 kg)	So	Reston, Virginia
G	13	Brian Oliver	6 ft 4 in (1.93 m)	205 lb (93 kg)	Jr	Smyrna, Georgia

Head coach

- Bobby Cremins (South Carolina)

Assistant coach(es)

- Kevin Cantwell
- Sherman Dillard
- Jimmy Hebron

Legend

- (C) Team captain
- (S) Suspended
- (I) Ineligible
- (W) Walk-on
- Injured
- Current redshirt
