= 1988–89 Virginia Cavaliers men's basketball team =

American college basketball season

1988–89 Virginia Cavaliers men's basketball

NCAA tournament, Elite Eight
- Conference: Atlantic Coast Conference
- Record: 22–11 (9–5 ACC)
- Head coach: Terry Holland (15th season)
- Assistant coaches: Jeff Jones (7th season); Dave Odom (7th season); Craig Littlepage (1st season)
- Home arena: University Hall

1988–89 ACC men's basketball standings
	Conf.				Overall
Team	W		L	PCT	W		L	PCT
No. 19 NC State	10	–	4	.714	22	–	9	.710
No. 9 Duke	9	–	5	.643	28	–	8	.778
Virginia	9	–	5	.643	22	–	11	.667
No. 5 North Carolina †	9	–	5	.643	29	–	8	.784
Georgia Tech	8	–	6	.571	20	–	12	.625
Clemson	7	–	7	.500	19	–	11	.633
Wake Forest	3	–	11	.214	13	–	15	.464
Maryland	1	–	13	.071	9	–	20	.310
† 1989 ACC tournament winner Rankings from AP Poll

The 1988–89 Virginia Cavaliers men's basketball team represented University of Virginia as a member of the Atlantic Coast Conference during the 1988–89 NCAA Division I men's basketball season. The team was led by 15th-year head coach Terry Holland. The Cavaliers earned an at-large bid to the NCAA tournament as #5 seed in the Southeast region, and made a run to the Elite Eight before falling to Michigan, the eventual national champion.

== Roster ==
1988–89 Virginia Cavaliers men's basketball team
Players
Coaches

Pos.	#	Name	Height	Weight	Year	Hometown
G	11	Richard Morgan	6 ft 3 in (1.91 m)	—	Sr
G/F	20	Bryant Stith	6 ft 5 in (1.96 m)	—	Fr	Emporia, Virginia
G	22	John Crotty	6 ft 1 in (1.85 m)	—	So	Orange, New Jersey
F	34	Bill Batts	6 ft 8 in (2.03 m)	—	Sr
C	42	Brent Bair	6 ft 10 in (2.08 m)	—	Sr

Head coach

- Terry Holland (Davidson)

Assistant coach(es)

- Craig Littlepage (Penn)
- Jeff Jones (Virginia)

Legend

- (C) Team captain
- (S) Suspended
- (I) Ineligible
- (W) Walk-on
- Injured
- Current redshirt

== Schedule and results ==
Date time, TV	Rank^{#}	Opponent^{#}	Result	Record	High points	High rebounds	High assists	Site (attendance) city, state
Regular season
Nov 25, 1988*		Dartmouth	W 99–73	1–0	20 – Crotty	6 – Tied	4 – Crotty	University Hall (8,864); Charlottesville, Virginia
Nov 26, 1988*		Marquette	W 80–63	2–0	17 – Stith	9 – Batts	7 – Crotty	University Hall (6,380); Charlottesville, Virginia
Nov 30, 1988*		Arkansas	W 75–65	3–0	21 – Morgan	5 – Crotty	7 – Crotty	University Hall (8,864); Charlottesville, Virginia
Dec 3, 1988*		Towson State	W 87–79	4–0	26 – Morgan	7 – Morgan	9 – Crotty	University Hall (8,864); Charlottesville, Virginia
Dec 6, 1988*		Fairleigh Dickinson	W 88–61	5–0	21 – Stith	5 – Dabbs	5 – Crotty	University Hall (8,864); Charlottesville, Virginia
Dec 10, 1988*		No. 18 Connecticut	L 61–68	5–1	17 – Stith	10 – Dabbs	4 – Crotty	University Hall (8,864); Charlottesville, Virginia
Dec 19, 1988*		Jacksonville	W 86–81	6–1	18 – Morgan	11 – Stith	7 – Crotty	University Hall (8,664); Charlottesville, Virginia
Dec 21, 1988*		UC-Irvine	W 99–89	7–1	27 – Morgan	10 – Morgan	7 – Crotty	University Hall (8,264); Charlottesville, Virginia
Dec 28, 1988*		vs. No. 13 Seton Hall; Sugar Bowl Tournament	L 67–84	7–2	20 – Morgan	8 – Stith	2 – Tied	Louisiana Superdome (4,915); New Orleans, Louisiana
Dec 29, 1988*		vs. Mississippi State; Sugar Bowl Tournament Consolation	L 84–86	7–3	19 – Stith	12 – Dabbs	5 – Morgan	Louisiana Superdome; New Orleans, Louisiana
Jan 4, 1989*		at No. 13 Louisville	L 71–74	7–4	16 – Tied	8 – Blundin	6 – Crotty	Freedom Hall (19,272); Louisville, Kentucky
Jan 7, 1989		No. 1 Duke	L 76–84	7–5 (0–1)	31 – Morgan	10 – Blundin	5 – Crotty	University Hall (8,864); Charlottesville, Virginia
Jan 11, 1989		at Clemson	L 70–80	7–6 (0–2)	19 – Morgan	11 – Stith	5 – Crotty	Littlejohn Coliseum (9,500); Clemson, South Carolina
Jan 15, 1989		No. 8 North Carolina	W 106–83	8–6 (1–2)	39 – Morgan	9 – Blundin	5 – Crotty	University Hall (8,864); Charlottesville, Virginia
Jan 17, 1989		at Maryland	W 64–58	9–6 (2–2)	21 – Morgan	9 – Tied	8 – Crotty	Cole Fieldhouse (10,768); College Park, Maryland
Jan 25, 1989*		vs. Virginia Tech	W 113–106	10–6	28 – Morgan	15 – Blundin	8 – Crotty	Richmond Coliseum (10,716); Richmond, Virginia
Jan 28, 1989		Wake Forest	W 88–69	11–6 (3–2)	25 – Morgan	9 – Stith	5 – Crotty	University Hall (8,864); Charlottesville, Virginia
Feb 1, 1989		No. 13 NC State	W 91–71	12–6 (4–2)	20 – Morgan	12 – Stith	7 – Crotty	University Hall (8,864); Charlottesville, Virginia
Feb 6, 1989		Georgia Tech	W 78–71	13–6 (5–2)	23 – Morgan	9 – Dabbs	6 – Crotty	University Hall (8,864); Charlottesville, Virginia
Feb 8, 1989		at No. 14 Duke	L 66–85	13–7 (5–3)	13 – Morgan	5 – Stith	4 – Crotty	Cameron Indoor Stadium (9,314); Durham, North Carolina
Feb 12, 1989		at No. 6 North Carolina	L 67–85	13–8 (5–4)	20 – Stith	12 – Stith	4 – Tied	Dean Smith Center (21,444); Chapel Hill, North Carolina
Feb 16, 1989*		VMI	W 92–79	14–8	22 – Dabbs	11 – Dabbs	4 – Crotty	University Hall (8,864); Charlottesville, Virginia
Feb 18, 1989		Clemson	W 85–83	15–8 (6–4)	16 – Dabbs	12 – Dabbs	9 – Crotty	University Hall (8,864); Charlottesville, Virginia
Feb 22, 1989		at Georgia Tech	L 65–73	15–9 (6–5)	28 – Stith	12 – Dabbs	9 – Crotty	Alexander Memorial Coliseum (8,113); Atlanta, Georgia
Feb 26, 1989		at No. 17 NC State	W 76–75	16–9 (7–5)	29 – Stith	13 – Dabbs	8 – Crotty	Reynolds Coliseum (12,400); Raleigh, North Carolina
Mar 1, 1989		at Wake Forest	W 81–72	17–9 (8–5)	23 – Morgan	10 – Stith	7 – Crotty	Winston-Salem Memorial Coliseum (8,200); Winston-Salem, North Carolina
Mar 5, 1989		Maryland	W 86–59	18–9 (9–5)	34 – Morgan	12 – Stith	8 – Crotty	University Hall (8,864); Charlottesville, Virginia
ACC Tournament
Mar 10, 1989*		vs. Clemson; ACC Tournament Quarterfinal	W 90–73	19–9	18 – Crotty	9 – Dabbs	5 – Stith	Omni Coliseum (16,723); Atlanta, Georgia
Mar 11, 1989*		vs. No. 7 Duke; ACC Tournament Semifinal	L 58–69	19–10	15 – Stith	8 – Dabbs	5 – Crotty	Omni Coliseum (16,723); Atlanta, Georgia
NCAA tournament
Mar 16, 1989*	(5 SE)	vs. (12 SE) Providence; First round	W 100–97	20–10	33 – Morgan	7 – Tied	10 – Crotty	Memorial Gymnasium (12,541); Nashville, Tennessee
Mar 18, 1989*	(5 SE)	vs. (13 SE) Middle Tennessee State; Second round	W 104–88	21–10	33 – Morgan	10 – Daniel	14 – Crotty	Memorial Gymnasium (13,453); Nashville, Tennessee
Mar 23, 1989*	(5 SE)	vs. (1 SE) No. 4 Oklahoma; Southeast Regional semifinal	W 86–80	22–10	28 – Stith	14 – Dabbs	8 – Crotty	Rupp Arena (22,314); Lexington, Kentucky
Mar 25, 1989*	(5 SE)	vs. (3 SE) No. 10 Michigan; Southeast Regional Final	L 65–102	22–11	15 – Morgan	12 – Dabbs	7 – Crotty	Rupp Arena (22,755); Lexington, Kentucky
*Non-conference game. ^{#}Rankings from AP poll. (#) Tournament seedings in parentheses. All times are in Eastern time.
