= 1989 ACC men's basketball tournament =

- Classification: Division I
- Season: 1988–89
- Teams: 8
- Site: Atlanta, Georgia; Omni Coliseum
- Champions: North Carolina (11th title)
- Winning coach: Dean Smith (10th title)
- MVP: J. R. Reid (North Carolina)
- Television: Raycom/Jefferson-Pilot (Inside the ACC Footprint); NBC (Outside the ACC Footprint)

1988–89 ACC men's basketball standings
	Conf.				Overall
Team	W		L	PCT	W		L	PCT
No. 19 NC State	10	–	4	.714	22	–	9	.710
No. 9 Duke	9	–	5	.643	28	–	8	.778
Virginia	9	–	5	.643	22	–	11	.667
No. 5 North Carolina †	9	–	5	.643	29	–	8	.784
Georgia Tech	8	–	6	.571	20	–	12	.625
Clemson	7	–	7	.500	19	–	11	.633
Wake Forest	3	–	11	.214	13	–	15	.464
Maryland	1	–	13	.071	9	–	20	.310
† 1989 ACC tournament winner Rankings from AP Poll

The 1989 Atlantic Coast Conference men's basketball tournament took place in Atlanta, Georgia, at the Omni Coliseum. North Carolina won the tournament by defeating Duke, 77–74, in the championship game. J. R. Reid of North Carolina was named tournament MVP.

This was the first time the 1 seed in the ACC Tournament has failed to reach the semifinals.

== Bracket ==
Quarterfinals; March 10
1	#17 NC State	43
8	Maryland	71
4	#9 North Carolina	77
5	Georgia Tech	62
2	#7 Duke	88
7	Wake Forest	64
3	Virginia	90
6	Clemson	73

Semifinals; March 11
8	Maryland	58
4	#9 North Carolina	88
2	#7 Duke	69
3	Virginia	58

Championship Game; March 12
4	#9 North Carolina	77
2	#7 Duke	74

AP rankings at time of tournament
