= J. R. Reid =

American basketball player (born 1968)

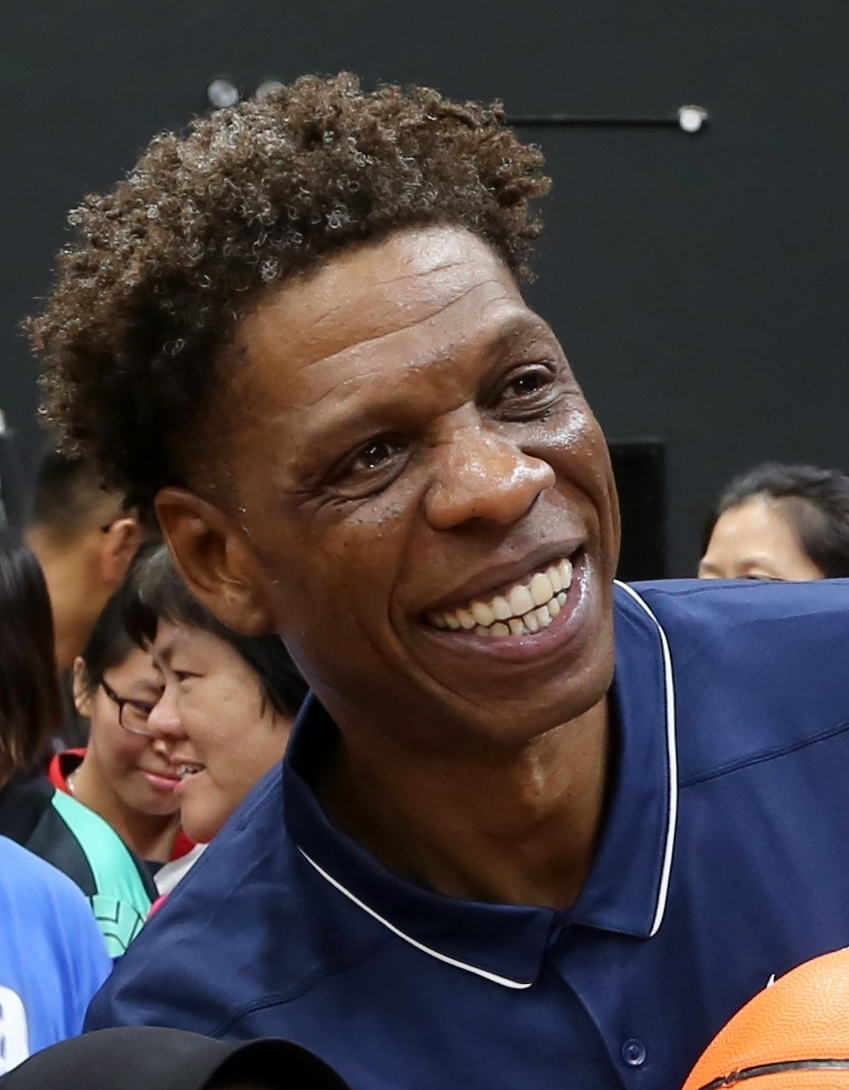
- Reid in 2019

Personal information
- Born: March 31, 1968 (age 58) Virginia Beach, Virginia, U.S.
- Listed height: 6 ft 9 in (2.06 m)
- Listed weight: 247 lb (112 kg)

Career information
- High school: Kempsville (Virginia Beach, Virginia)
- College: North Carolina (1986–1989)
- NBA draft: 1989: 1st round, 5th overall pick
- Drafted by: Charlotte Hornets
- Playing career: 1989–2003
- Position: Power forward / center
- Number: 34, 7, 11, 31
- Coaching career: 2011–2022

Career history

Playing
- 1989–1992: Charlotte Hornets
- 1992–1996: San Antonio Spurs
- 1996: New York Knicks
- 1996–1997: Paris Basket Racing
- 1997–1999: Charlotte Hornets
- 1999: Los Angeles Lakers
- 1999–2000: Milwaukee Bucks
- 2000–2001: Cleveland Cavaliers
- 2001–2002: Strasbourg
- 2002–2003: Baloncesto León

Coaching
- 2011–2013: Patrick Henry CC (assistant)
- 2018–2022: Monmouth (assistant)

Career highlights
- French League champion (1997); NBA All-Rookie Second Team (1990); Consensus first-team All-American (1988); Third-team All-American – NABC (1989); First-team All-ACC (1988); Second-team All-ACC (1987); ACC Rookie of the Year (1987); ACC tournament MVP (1989); No. 34 honored by North Carolina Tar Heels; National high school player of the year (1986); 2× First-team Parade All-American (1985, 1986); McDonald's All-American Game MVP (1986); Virginia Mr. Basketball (1986)

Career NBA statistics
- Points: 5,680 (8.5 ppg)
- Rebounds: 3,381 (5.0 rpg)
- Assists: 639 (1.5 apg)
- Stats at NBA.com
- Stats at Basketball Reference
Medals
Men's basketball
Representing United States
Olympic Games
Bronze medal – third place	1988 Seoul	Team competition

Herman "J. R." Reid Jr. (born March 31, 1968) is an American former professional basketball player. He played in the National Basketball Association (NBA) for the Charlotte Hornets, San Antonio Spurs, New York Knicks, Los Angeles Lakers, Milwaukee Bucks and Cleveland Cavaliers. Reid played college basketball for the North Carolina Tar Heels and was a consensus first-team All-American as a sophomore in 1988. He won a bronze medal as a member of the United States national team at the 1988 Summer Olympics.

== Early life ==
Reid was born and raised in Virginia Beach, Virginia, and was the son of Herman Reid Sr., who played football in the 1960s with the Baltimore Colts. Reid played football himself in his early years as a defensive player and his gridiron skills even caught the attention of the Virginia Tech Hokies, but he decided to stick with playing basketball. Reid starred at Kempsville High School in Virginia Beach, being named the 1986 Gatorade and USA Today Player of the Year. He certified his reputation by being named most valuable player (MVP) of both the 1986 McDonald's Game and the Capital Classic.

== College career ==
Reid played college basketball for the North Carolina Tar Heels from 1986 to 1989. He was named ACC Rookie of the Year in 1987 as he averaged 14.7 points and 7 rebounds per game. During his freshman year at UNC, he was featured on the March 2, 1987 cover of Sports Illustrated magazine. During his sophomore season, he was named a consensus first-team All-American when he averaged 18 points and 8.9 rebounds per game.

Reid was named to the 1988 United States men's Olympic basketball team to compete at the 1988 Summer Olympics. He played in six games and averaged 6 points per game.

=== College statistics ===
Legend
GP	Games played	GS	Games started	MPG	Minutes per game
FG%	Field goal percentage	3P%	3-point field goal percentage	FT%	Free throw percentage
RPG	Rebounds per game	APG	Assists per game	SPG	Steals per game
BPG	Blocks per game	PPG	Points per game	**Bold**	Career high

Year	Team	GP	GS	MPG	FG%	3P%	FT%	RPG	APG	SPG	BPG	PPG
1986–87	North Carolina	**36**	31	28.6	.584	.000	.653	7.4	**1.8**	**1.3**	0.8	14.7
1987–88	North Carolina	33	**33**	**31.6**	.607	.000	**.680**	**8.9**	1.7	1.2	**1.2**	**18.0**
1988–89	North Carolina	27	16	26.5	**.614**	.000	.669	6.3	1.3	0.9	0.8	15.9
Career		96	80	29.0	.601	.000	.668	7.6	1.7	1.1	0.9	16.2

== Professional career ==
He was drafted by the Charlotte Hornets as the 5th overall pick in the 1989 NBA draft. On February 25, 1996, in a game against the Phoenix Suns, A.C. Green mentioned an incident at a New York City club before Reid hit him with a vicious right elbow in the mouth during the fourth quarter of the game, knocking out two of Green's teeth. Reid was suspended for two games and fined $10,000.

In the 1996–97 season, Reid played in France, winning the national championship with Paris Basket Racing. He returned to the NBA, before rounding out his professional career in France and Spain.

During his NBA career, he saw action in a total of 672 regular season games and 47 playoff games.

== NBA career statistics ==
Legend
GP	Games played	GS	Games started	MPG	Minutes per game
FG%	Field goal percentage	3P%	3-point field goal percentage	FT%	Free throw percentage
RPG	Rebounds per game	APG	Assists per game	SPG	Steals per game
BPG	Blocks per game	PPG	Points per game	**Bold**	Career high
*	Led the league

=== Regular season ===
Year	Team	GP	GS	MPG	FG%	3P%	FT%	RPG	APG	SPG	BPG	PPG
1989–90	Charlotte	**82***	**82**	33.6	.440	.000	.664	**8.4**	1.2	1.1	**0.7**	11.1
1990–91	Charlotte	80	80	30.8	.466	.000	.703	6.3	1.1	1.1	0.6	11.3
1991–92	Charlotte	51	7	24.6	.490	.000	.705	6.2	**1.6**	1.0	0.5	11.0
1992–93	Charlotte	17	1	17.4	.429	.000	.741	4.1	1.4	0.6	0.3	7.5
1992–93	San Antonio	66	24	24.1	.485	.000	.770	5.8	0.8	0.5	0.4	9.9
1993–94	San Antonio	70	11	19.2	.491	.000	.699	3.1	1.0	0.6	0.4	9.0
1994–95	San Antonio	81	37	19.3	.508	**.500**	.687	4.9	0.7	0.7	0.4	7.0
1995–96	San Antonio	32	5	20.1	.439	.000	.736	3.8	0.4	0.8	0.3	6.5
1995–96	New York	33	16	20.3	**.550**	.000	.782	4.0	0.8	0.5	0.2	6.6
1997–98	Charlotte	79	1	14.0	.459	.375	.730	2.7	0.6	0.4	0.2	4.9
1998–99	Charlotte	16	16	**34.8**	.521	.000	**.798**	7.1	**1.6**	**1.4**	0.6	**15.2**
1998–99	Los Angeles	25	10	18.9	.407	.000	.717	4.0	0.9	0.6	0.0	5.0
1999–00	Milwaukee	34	7	17.7	.417	.143	.768	3.4	0.5	0.6	0.1	4.4
2000–01	Cleveland	6	0	6.5	.400	.000	.750	1.3	0.2	0.3	0.2	1.7
Career		672	297	22.9	.472	.135	.716	5.0	1.0	0.8	0.4	8.5

=== Playoffs ===
Year	Team	GP	GS	MPG	FG%	3P%	FT%	RPG	APG	SPG	BPG	PPG
1992–93	San Antonio	10	2	22.0	.483	.000	.771	5.0	**1.5**	**0.8**	**0.8**	**8.5**
1993–94	San Antonio	4	0	14.0	.286	.000	.600	3.0	0.8	0.3	0.5	3.8
1994–95	San Antonio	**15**	1	13.9	.492	.000	**.846**	2.8	0.6	0.5	0.3	6.1
1995–96	New York	1	0	7.0	**1.000**	.000	.000	1.0	1.0	0.0	0.0	2.0
1997–98	Charlotte	9	0	12.7	.393	.000	.800	2.2	0.2	0.3	0.2	3.3
1998–99	Los Angeles	8	**8**	**22.3**	.357	.000	.750	**5.3**	0.4	0.5	0.6	3.3
Career		47	11	16.7	.437	.000	.794	3.6	0.7	0.5	0.4	5.3

== Post-playing career ==
After his NBA career, he competed to become an analyst on the former ESPN TV show Dream Job, but lost. In 2011, he was named an assistant coach for Patrick & Henry Community College. He joined the Monmouth Hawks men's basketball team in 2018 after being hired as an assistant to former UNC teammate King Rice. Reid stayed in that job until 2022.

== Transactions ==
- Drafted by Charlotte Hornets in first round (5th overall) of 1989 NBA draft.
- Traded by Charlotte to the San Antonio Spurs for Sidney Green, a 1993 first-round pick and a 1996 second-round pick on December 9, 1992.
- Traded by San Antonio with Brad Lohaus and a future first-round pick to the New York Knicks for Charles Smith and Monty Williams on February 12, 1996.
- Played in France during 1996–97 season, winning the national championship with Paris SG, averaging 18.5 points and 8.6 rebounds per game in the French league.
- Signed as a free agent by Charlotte on July 16, 1997.
- Traded by Charlotte with B. J. Armstrong and Glen Rice to the Los Angeles Lakers for Elden Campbell and Eddie Jones on March 10, 1999.
- Signed as free agent by Milwaukee Bucks on August 20, 1999.
- Traded by Milwaukee with Robert Traylor to Cleveland Cavaliers as part of a three-team deal on June 27, 2000 (Golden State Warriors received Vinny Del Negro from Milwaukee and Bob Sura from Cleveland; Milwaukee received Jason Caffey and Billy Owens from Golden State).
- Waived by Cleveland on January 2, 2001.
