= 1988–89 Washington Huskies men's basketball team =

American college basketball season

1988–89 Washington Huskies men's basketball
- Conference: Pacific-10 Conference
- Record: 12–16 (8–10 Pac-10)
- Head coach: Andy Russo (4th season)
- Assistant coach: Ritchie McKay
- Home arena: Hec Edmundson Pavilion

1988–89 Pacific-10 Conference men's basketball standings
	Conf.				Overall
Team	W		L	PCT	W		L	PCT
No. 1 Arizona †	17	–	1	.944	29	–	4	.879
No. 13 Stanford	15	–	3	.833	26	–	7	.788
UCLA	13	–	5	.722	21	–	10	.677
Oregon State	13	–	5	.722	22	–	8	.733
California	10	–	8	.556	20	–	13	.606
Washington	8	–	10	.444	12	–	16	.429
Arizona State	5	–	13	.278	12	–	16	.429
Washington State	4	–	14	.222	10	–	19	.345
Oregon	3	–	15	.167	8	–	21	.276
USC	2	–	16	.111	10	–	22	.313
† Conference tournament winner As of April 15, 1989; Rankings from AP poll

The 1988–89 Washington Huskies men's basketball team represented the University of Washington for the 1988–89 NCAA Division I men's basketball season. Led by fourth-year head coach Andy Russo, the Huskies were members of the Pacific-10 Conference and played their home games on campus at Hec Edmundson Pavilion in Seattle, Washington.

The Huskies were 12–15 overall in the regular season and 8–10 in conference play, sixth in the standings. In the Pac-10 tournament in southern California at The Forum, Washington lost to third seed UCLA by ten points in the quarterfinal.

Russo resigned less than two weeks later, and was succeeded by alumnus Lynn Nance, the head coach at Saint Mary's. The Gaels were WCAC champions, received an at-large berth in the NCAA tournament, and finished at 25–4 in 1989.

This season's Final Four was held in Seattle at the Kingdome.

== Postseason results ==
Date time, TV	Opponent	Result	Record	Site (attendance) city, state
Pacific-10 Tournament
Fri, March 10; 9:00 pm	vs. (3) UCLA; Quarterfinal	L 54–64	12–16	The Forum (9,001); Inglewood, California
*Non-conference game. ^{#}Rankings from AP poll. (#) Tournament seedings in parentheses. All times are in Pacific time.
