= 1988–89 Gonzaga Bulldogs men's basketball team =

American college basketball season

1988–89 Gonzaga Bulldogs men's basketball
- Conference: West Coast Athletic Conference
- Record: 14–14 (5–9 WCAC)
- Head coach: Dan Fitzgerald (7th season)
- Assistant coach: Dan Monson
- Home arena: Martin Centre

1988–89 West Coast Conference men's basketball standings
| | Conf. | | | | Overall |
| Team | W | | L | PCT | W | | L | PCT |
|---|---|---|---|---|---|---|---|---|
| Saint Mary's | 12 | – | 2 | .857 | 25 | – | 5 | .833 |
| Pepperdine | 10 | – | 4 | .714 | 20 | – | 13 | .606 |
| Loyola Marymount † | 10 | – | 4 | .714 | 20 | – | 11 | .645 |
| San Francisco | 8 | – | 6 | .571 | 16 | – | 12 | .571 |
| Santa Clara | 7 | – | 7 | .500 | 20 | – | 11 | .645 |
| Gonzaga | 5 | – | 9 | .357 | 14 | – | 14 | .500 |
| San Diego | 2 | – | 12 | .143 | 8 | – | 20 | .286 |
| Portland | 2 | – | 12 | .143 | 2 | – | 26 | .071 |
† Conference tournament winner Rankings from AP poll

The 1988–89 Gonzaga Bulldogs men's basketball team represented Gonzaga University in the West Coast Athletic Conference (WCAC) during the 1988–89 NCAA Division I men's basketball season. Led by seventh-year head coach Dan Fitzgerald, the Bulldogs were 14–13 (.519) overall in the regular season (5–9 in WCAC, sixth), and played their home games on campus at the Charlotte Y. Martin Centre (formerly known as Kennedy Pavilion) in Spokane, Washington.

At the third conference tournament, the Zags lost again in the quarterfinals, this time to eventual champion Loyola Marymount, to finish at 14–14 (.500). Their first tournament wins came three years later in 1992; they advanced to the final, but fell by three to top-seeded Pepperdine.

== Postseason results ==
| Date time, TV | Rank^{#} | Opponent^{#} | Result | Record | Site (attendance) city, state |
WCAC tournament
| Sat, March 4; 6:00 pm | (6) | vs. (3); Loyola Marymount; Quarterfinal | L 98–101 | 14–14 | War Memorial Gymnasium; San Francisco, California |
*Non-conference game. ^{#}Rankings from AP poll. (#) Tournament seedings in parentheses. All times are in Pacific time.
