= 1988–89 NC State Wolfpack men's basketball team =

American college basketball season

1988–89 NC State Wolfpack men's basketball

ACC Regular Season Champions

NCAA tournament, Sweet 16
- Conference: Atlantic Coast Conference

Ranking
- Coaches: No. 18
- AP: No. 19
- Record: 22–9 (10–4 ACC)
- Head coach: Jim Valvano (9th season)
- Home arena: Reynolds Coliseum

1988–89 ACC men's basketball standings
	Conf.				Overall
Team	W		L	PCT	W		L	PCT
No. 19 NC State	10	–	4	.714	22	–	9	.710
No. 9 Duke	9	–	5	.643	28	–	8	.778
Virginia	9	–	5	.643	22	–	11	.667
No. 5 North Carolina †	9	–	5	.643	29	–	8	.784
Georgia Tech	8	–	6	.571	20	–	12	.625
Clemson	7	–	7	.500	19	–	11	.633
Wake Forest	3	–	11	.214	13	–	15	.464
Maryland	1	–	13	.071	9	–	20	.310
† 1989 ACC tournament winner Rankings from AP Poll

The 1988–89 NC State Wolfpack men's basketball team represented North Carolina State University as a member of the Atlantic Coast Conference during the 1988–89 men's college basketball season. It was Jim Valvano's ninth season as head coach.

== Roster ==
1988–89 NC State Wolfpack men's basketball team
Players
Coaches

Pos.	#	Name	Height	Weight	Year	Hometown
G	11	Kelsey Weems	6 ft 2 in (1.88 m)	180 lb (82 kg)	Sr	Atlanta, Georgia
G	13	Chris Corchiani	6 ft 1 in (1.85 m)	185 lb (84 kg)	So	Coral Gables, Florida
G	21	Rodney Monroe	6 ft 3 in (1.91 m)	185 lb (84 kg)	So	Baltimore, Maryland
F	22	Brian Howard	6 ft 6 in (1.98 m)	205 lb (93 kg)	Jr	Winston-Salem, North Carolina
F	24	Tom Gugliotta	6 ft 10 in (2.08 m)	235 lb (107 kg)	Fr	Huntington Station, New York
F	52	Chucky Brown	6 ft 7 in (2.01 m)	210 lb (95 kg)	Sr	New York, New York

Head coach

- Jim Valvano (Rutgers)

Assistant coach(es)

Legend

- (C) Team captain
- (S) Suspended
- (I) Ineligible
- (W) Walk-on
- Injured
- Current redshirt

== Schedule ==
Date time, TV	Rank^{#}	Opponent^{#}	Result	Record	Site city, state
Regular season
November 26*	No. 18	Columbia	W 110–54	1-0	Reynolds Coliseum; Raleigh, NC
November 28*	No. 18	Akron	W 87–67	2-0	Reynolds Coliseum; Raleigh, NC
December 3*	No. 16	at Southern Methodist	L 57–59	2-1	Moody Coliseum; University Park, TX
January 5	No. 16	at Clemson	W 73–65	8–1 (1–0)	Littlejohn Coliseum; Clemson, SC
January 7*	No. 16	Temple	W 71–59	9–1	Reynolds Coliseum; Raleigh, NC
January 12*	No. 16	Coastal Carolina	W 97–69	10–1	Reynolds Coliseum; Raleigh, NC
January 14	No. 15	No. 19 Georgia Tech	W 82–68	11–1 (2–0)	Reynolds Coliseum; Raleigh, NC
January 21	No. 15	at No. 13 North Carolina	L 81–84	12–2 (3–1)	Dean Smith Center; Chapel Hill, North Carolina
January 26	No. 15	No. 8 Duke	W 88–73	13–2 (4–1)	Reynolds Coliseum; Raleigh, NC
February 9	No. 17	No. 6 North Carolina	W 98–88	15–4 (6–3)	Reynolds Coliseum; Raleigh, NC
March 4	No. 20	Wake Forest	W 110–103	20–7 (10–4)	Winston-Salem Memorial Coliseum; Winston-Salem, NC
ACC Tournament
March 10*	No. 17	vs. Maryland; ACC tournament	L 49–71	20-8	The Omni; Atlanta, GA
NCAA Tournament
March 17*; CBS	(5) No. 19	vs. (12) South Carolina; First Round	W 81-66	21-8	Dunkin' Donuts Center; Providence, RI
March 19*; CBS	(5) No. 19	vs. (4) No. 14 Iowa; Second Round	W 102-96 ^{2 OT}	22-8	Dunkin' Donuts Center; Providence, RI
March 24*; CBS	(5) No. 19	vs. (1) No. 2 Georgetown; Sweet Sixteen	L 61-69	22-9	Brendan Byrne Arena (19,508); East Rutherford, NJ
*Non-conference game. ^{#}Rankings from AP Poll. (#) Tournament seedings in parentheses.

== Rankings ==
Ranking movements Legend: ██ Increase in ranking ██ Decrease in ranking — = Not ranked
	Week																	
Poll	Pre	1	2	3	4	5	6	7	8	9	10	11	12	13	14	15	16	Final
AP	18	18	16	19	18	17	18	16	15	15	15	13	17	19	17	20	17	19
Coaches	20	20	—	—	20	20	18	18	17	15	15	12	17	18	15	18	13	18
