= Anthony Cook (basketball) =

American basketball player

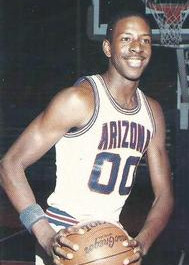
- Cook, circa 1987

Personal information
- Born: March 19, 1967 (age 59) Los Angeles, California, U.S.
- Listed height: 6 ft 9 in (2.06 m)
- Listed weight: 205 lb (93 kg)

Career information
- High school: Van Nuys (Los Angeles, California)
- College: Arizona (1985–1989)
- NBA draft: 1989: 1st round, 24th overall pick
- Drafted by: Phoenix Suns
- Playing career: 1989–1997
- Position: Power forward / center
- Number: 00, 38

Career history
- 1989–1990: P.A.O.K.
- 1990–1993: Denver Nuggets
- 1993–1994: Orlando Magic
- 1994: Milwaukee Bucks
- 1994–1995: Levallois
- 1995–1996: Portland Trail Blazers
- 1996–1997: Florida Beach Dogs

Career highlights
- 2× First-team All-Pac-10 (1988, 1989)
- Stats at NBA.com
- Stats at Basketball Reference

Anthony Lacquise Cook (born March 19, 1967) is an American former professional basketball player.

After having played collegiately at the University of Arizona, power forward–center Cook was selected by the Phoenix Suns in the first round (24th overall pick) of the 1989 NBA draft, and then traded on draft day to the Detroit Pistons in exchange for Micheal Williams and the Pistons' first round draft choice (27th overall pick), Kenny Battle. Cook chose not to join the Pistons, electing to play in Greece instead for P.A.O.K. B.C. He returned to the United States after one season and played in four NBA seasons for the Denver Nuggets, Orlando Magic, Milwaukee Bucks and Portland Trail Blazers, in a career marred by numerous injuries. He had his best season as a rookie in 1990–91, when he appeared in 58 games for the Nuggets and averaged 5.3 ppg and 5.6 rpg.

== NBA career statistics ==
Legend
GP	Games played	GS	Games started	MPG	Minutes per game
FG%	Field goal percentage	3P%	3-point field goal percentage	FT%	Free throw percentage
RPG	Rebounds per game	APG	Assists per game	SPG	Steals per game
BPG	Blocks per game	PPG	Points per game	**Bold**	Career high

=== Regular season ===
Year	Team	GP	GS	MPG	FG%	3P%	FT%	RPG	APG	SPG	BPG	PPG
1990–91	Denver	**58**	**25**	**19.3**	.417	.000	.550	**5.6**	**0.4**	**0.6**	**1.2**	**5.3**
1991–92	Denver	22	0	5.2	**.600**	.000	**.667**	1.5	0.1	0.2	0.2	1.5
1993–94	Orlando	2	0	1.0	.000	.000	.000	0.0	0.0	0.0	1.0	0.0
1993–94	Milwaukee	23	0	8.7	.491	.000	.400	2.4	0.2	0.1	0.5	2.7
1995–96	Portland	11	0	5.5	.438	.000	.250	1.1	0.2	0.0	0.1	1.4
