= Paul Landreaux =

American basketball coach

Biographical details
- Born: December 19, 1943; New Orleans, Louisiana
- Died: August 22, 2016 (aged 72)
- Education: Cal State, Los Angeles

Coaching career (HC unless noted)
- 1979–1988: El Camino College
- 1988–1989: UCLA (assistant)
- 1989–1991: Saint Mary's
- 1991–2007: El Camino College

Paul David Landreaux Jr. (December 19, 1943 – August 22, 2016) was an American college basketball coach. He spent the majority of his career as head coach at El Camino College, but also had stints as an assistant coach at UCLA and as head coach of Division I Saint Mary's in California.

Landreaux was a successful junior college coach at El Camino College, winning three state JC titles and compiling a 290–48 record before being hired at UCLA as an assistant. After one season, he was hired as head coach of Saint Mary's College in Moraga, California. In his first season, Landreaux led the team to a 7–20 mark. In his second season, he announced his resignation in December, 1990, effective the end of the 1990–91 season. He ultimately left in January, 1992. He later claimed that he had been set up by the school's administration. Following his stint at Saint Mary's, Landreaux returned to El Camino, where he remained until his retirement in 2007.

Landreaux died on August 22, 2016.
