= Gary Bossert =

American basketball player (born c.1964/65)

Personal information
- Born: c. 1964/1965
- Listed height: 5 ft 9 in (1.75 m)

Career information
- High school: Sweet Home (Amherst, New York); Kenmore West (Tonawanda, New York)
- College: Niagara (1983–1987)
- NBA draft: 1987: undrafted
- Position: Point guard

Career history

Coaching
- 198?–1989: Niagara (graduate assistant)
- 1989–1992: Norwood-Norfolk Central HS

Gary Bossert (born c. 1964/1965) is an American former college basketball player for the Niagara Purple Eagles. He ranks first in NCAA Division I history for most single-game consecutive three-point shots and second in American high-school history for most single-game free throws made without a miss.

Bossert was the first men's NCAA Division I player to make at least 12 three-point shots in a Division I game, establishing the NCAA Division I single-game three point shots made record. He was also the first men's NCAA Division I player to make 11 consecutive three-point shots, establishing the NCAA Division I consecutive three point shots made record. Both of these NCAA Division I records have been eclipsed. For the same performance, Bossert currently holds two other NCAA Division I records: single-game consecutive three-point shots made (shared) and single-game three-point shooting percentage. He is the current America East Conference (then known as the Eastern College Athletic Conference-North) record-holder for single-game three-point shots made (12) and shares the America East Conference men's basketball tournament single-game record for steals (8).

Bossert currently holds and formerly held several Niagara school records for steals, assists and three-point shots. As Niagara's point guard during the mid-1980s, he was part of the team that achieved the in 1984 "Miracle on Fourth Street" upset. Bossert went 26–26 from the free throw line in a 1982 New York State Public High School Athletic Association (NYSPHSAA) sectional championship game for Kenmore West Senior High School.

Bossert served as a graduate assistant coach at Niagara while pursuing his Master of Business Administration. He subsequently became a high school head coach and business teacher.

== Early life ==
Bossert is the son of former Seneca Vocational and Canisius guard Joe Bossert. Joe was a 1960 first team All-Western New York (WNY) selection by the Buffalo Courier-Express. Joe went on to coach basketball and Gary's younger brother Darrin followed Gary to Niagara. Bossert started getting media coverage for his play in the 1979 and 1980 13–15 youth summer league play at Martin Luther King Jr. Park.

== High school career ==
As a sophomore Bossert played the 1980–81 season for Sweet Home High School and helped oust Kenmore West in a 1981 NYSPHSAA Section VI Class A-1 semifinal. In that game he shot 10–12 coming off the bench for a then career high 23 points. In 1981, Bossert transferred to Kenmore West from Sweet Home. His high school class at Sweet Home was loaded with Division I athletes, including Barry Fordham (Michigan State basketball) and Blaine Russell (St. Bonaventure basketball) and won conference championships in 13 of the 26 boys and girls varsity sports that it competed in their senior year.

During his 1981–82 season, in which he was listed at 5 ft 9 in (1.75 m), 140 pounds (63.5 kg), he led the Niagara Frontier League (NFL) in scoring with a 22.1 average on 90.2% free throw shooting and 53.3% field goal shooting. The leading votegetter on the All-NFL team, he scored 119 points in four NYSPHSAA Section VI playoff games, including an upset victory over his formerly unbeaten Sweet Home teammates, in which he posted a 10–16 field goal and 9–10 free throw performance. On March 9, 1982, Bossert went 26–26 from the free throw line and totaled 44 points for Kenmore West in the NYSPHSAA Section VI Class A championship game loss to South Park High School. Bossert had his team ahead 80–75 with 2:30 remaining before losing 91–84. His non-free throws were described as acrobatic. As of April 14, 2006, this perfect free throw shooting performance remained the second best (31, Randy Patti of Rosedale High School on March 3, 1971) single-game free throw performance in terms of most free throws made in a game without a miss according to John Gillis, assistant director for the National Federation of State High School Associations and editor of the National High School Sports Record Book. Bossert established the Kenmore West single-game scoring record with his 44-point effort, which still stood as of December 28, 2019. He ended the season with an active free throw streak of 31. Juniors Curtis Aiken and Bossert were joined on the 1982 All-WNY team by Seniors James Clinton, Rodney Jones and Tony Kelly (Buffalo Courier Express), while The Buffalo Evening News swapped out Jones for Jeff Zern. Bossert was a 1982 large school New York State all-star team seventh team selection by the New York State Sportswriters Association. In the summer of 1982, Bossert was selected to the West New York Team for the Empire State Games scholastic (17 & under) boys' basketball competition, but did not see much action behind future Big East guards Aiken and Greg Monroe. The West team did upset New York City in overtime for the gold medal.

The 1983 Sweet Home team (with Fordham, Russell and Bryan Randall '84 — Dartmouth) is in the discussion as the All-time greatest WNY team. Without Russell and Fordham, Randall would lead the 1984 team (as 1984 WNY POY) to a NYSPHSAA Class A state title. Sweet Home had 3 first team All-WNY selections in 1983 and 1984. In the 1983 NYSPHSAA Section VI Class A-1 championship game at the Buffalo Memorial Auditorium, Sweet Home overcame a game-high 32 points by Bossert to beat Kenmore West in double overtime. In the game Kenmore West took their first lead of the game at 55–53 on 8 consecutive points by Bossert with four minutes remaining in regulation. Bossert finished the season with a 26.4 scoring average, 3.3 assists and 2.6 steals. After the Buffalo Courier Express and The Buffalo Evening News merged as The Buffalo News it selected Aiken, Bossert, Ray Salters, Michael Ray Jackson, and Barry Fordham to the 1983 All-WNY first team.

The Basketball Coaches Association of New York, celebrated their 25th anniversary in 2007 by naming regional 25-year teams for the 1983–2007 period based on high school performances. Bossert was among the top 25 for Western New York. In 2009 as The Buffalo News celebrated 50 years of All-WNY basketball selections, Bossert, who was twice an All-WNY first team selection was named to the 1980s All-WNY first team along with Aiken, Christian Laettner, Keith Robinson and Ritchie Campbell, and ahead of Ray Hall, Lester Rowe, et al. He was a third team selection for the All-time All-WNY team along with Jonny Flynn, Jason Rowe, Aaron Curry, and Jimmy "Bug" Williams. Bossert's 1982 All-WNY selection as a junior marked the first father-son All-WNY first team happening. Bossert is remembered for elevating the play of his teams.

== College career ==
When Niagara defeated the #4-ranked and 5–0 1984–85 St. John's Redmen on December 15, 1984, in one of the biggest upsets in school history, Bossert played key minutes. Students on campus wore purple and white buttons all season that said "We beat St. John's / December 15, 1984." The game, which featured Redmen all-time greats Chris Mullin, Mark Jackson, Walter Berry and Bill Wennington and was hosted at the Niagara Falls Convention Center, has been dubbed "Miracle on Fourth Street". Fans stormed the courts tore down a backboard and mailed "We Beat St. John's" t-shirts to Queens, New York. When Redmen later spent five weeks at the top of the 1984–85 rankings, Niagara was the only team to have previously beaten them that season. At the conclusion of the season the only two teams to have beaten St. John's were Georgetown (three times) and Niagara. Although the school had many big victories during the Calvin Murphy era, the only upset that rivals it in school history was snapping the #2-ranked St.Bonaventure Bonnies win streak at 99 in 1961 in front of the national press. On January 31, 1985 against Boston University, Bossert scored 21 points in an overtime victory. In that game, Bossert had another consecutive free throw streak reach 26, but not a single-game streak.

According to sports journalist Bob Lowe of the Tonawanda News it took Bossert, who had filled out to a size of 5 ft 9 in (1.75 m) and 160 pounds (72.6 kg) by the beginning of 1986, a couple of years of NCAA Division I play to adapt to defending bigger guards at that level. Lowe also described Bossert as an adept ballhandler and asset on the offensive end of the floor who could be described as the "coach on the court", "traffic cop" or "quarterback".

When the 1986–87 St. John's Redmen returned ranked and undefeated to the Buffalo–Niagara Falls Metropolitan Area for a matchup at Buffalo Memorial Auditorium on December 20, 1986, Bossert made a three-point shot to cut the deficit to 54–53 in the closing minutes, but St. Johns surged to a 66–58 victory. On January 7, 1987, Bossert became the first Purple Eagle to score 37 points in a conference game (Niagara was Independent until 1979 and teammate Joe Arlauckas would tie this school record on February 19), in a performance that set numerous NCAA records. Siena's coach, Mike Deane, deployed his usual matchup 2–3 zone defense, which is a combination of the man-to-man defense and a traditional 2–3 zone defense, that he learned from Jud Heathcote. Bossert was named America East Player of the Week on January 10, 1987. On February 5, 1987, he made a three-point shot with 8 or 9 seconds left to give Niagara a victory over the Reggie Lewis-led 1986–87 Northeastern Huskies. Bossert earned honorable mention All-America East recognition that season.

During the March 5, 1987 ECAC North men's basketball tournament semifinal against Boston University, he tied Al McClain's America East tournament record with 8 steals. In addition to the steals, Bossert made a field goal to give Niagara an 82–81 lead with 19 seconds remaining. Niagara held on to win 84–82. During his senior year, Niagara qualified for the 1987 National Invitation Tournament. In the opening round of the tournament, they defeated a Seton Hall team led by Mark Bryant and Ramón Ramos. They subsequently lost to a La Salle team with Lionel Simmons, Craig Conlin, Tim Legler, and Larry Koretz, despite 16 points by Bossert.

On November 2, 1994, Bossert was inducted into the Niagara Hall of Fame.

== Records ==
For the 1986–87 NCAA Division I men's basketball season the National Collegiate Athletic Association introduced the three-point shot. On January 7, 1987, Bossert became the first player to make at least 12 three point shots in a game for Niagara against Siena in an NCAA Division I America East contest. His NCAA Division I record for single-game three point shots made was matched on February 9 by Darrin Fitzgerald's 12–22 performance for Butler against Detroit in a Division I Midwestern Collegiate Conference (now Horizon League) contest. However, it was unsurpassed until December 21, 1989, when Dave Jamerson went 14-for-17 for the Ohio Bobcats of the Mid-American Conference against NCAA Division II's Charleston Golden Eagles. After Jamerson surpassed Bossert against a Division II opponent, some sources still referred to Bossert as the record holder. Al Dillard went 12–22 on December 11, 1993, for Arkansas against Delaware State. On March 24, 1994, Askia Jones went 14–18 for Kansas State of the Big Eight Conference against Fresno State of NCAA Division I Western Athletic Conference.

On that January 7 night, Bossert established the former NCAA Division I consecutive three-point shot record and the current NCAA Division I single-game consecutive three-point shot record (both 11) and the current NCAA single-game three-point shooting percentage record (85.7%, min 12 made) with a 12–14 performance, including a perfect 7–7 first half. Todd Leslie of Northwestern converted 15 straight three-point shots over a four-game span against Loyola, Morgan State, St. Louis and Boston College from December 15 to December 28, 1990, to overtake Bossert's consecutive three-point shot record, although it took about 10 days of research technology of the day to confirm this. Although not listed in the NCAA record book, Ronald Blackshear tied Bossert by making his first 11 three-point shots on March 1, 2002, for Marshall against Akron, but his 14–23 three point shooting night fell one short of the single-game record, which had reached 15. Bossert's 12 single-game three point shots made is tied for 10th in annual top 25 update of the Division I Men's Basketball Record book: This performance still marks the America East single-game three-point shots made record. It is also when the current Niagara records for single-half and single-game three point shots made (7 & 12) were set. While some still recognized Bossert's as the holder of the single-game three point shots made record, another Western New York athlete set the National Junior College Athletic Association single-game three point shots made record, when Bill Perkins went 17–40 for Villa Maria College in a victory over Jamestown Community College-Olean on November 20, 1990.

Bossert additionally holds Niagara records for single-season and career three-point shooting percentage (both 44.8%), single-conference game assists (15, Vermont, 1/22/87), and single-season assists (195).. He formerly held Niagara records for single-season three-point shots made (87), single-conference game points (37, Siena, 1/7/87), single-game steals (8, Boston, 3/5/87), career steals (144), career steals average (1.3), and career assists (498).

After his NCAA record-setting night, Bossert gave an opinion that the newly created three-point line distance should be 1 to 2 feet (0.30 to 0.61 m) further. When Bossert established his NCAA three-point shot records, the three-point line was at 19 feet 9 inches (6.02 metres), but for the 2008–09 NCAA Division I men's basketball season, the line was extended to 20 feet 9 inches (6.32 metres). For the 2019–20 NCAA Division I men's basketball season, the line was further extended to 22 feet 1.75 inches (6.75 metres).

== Professional career ==
Bossert spent time as a graduate assistant at Niagara. By July 27, 1989, Bossert had earned a Master of Business Administration from Niagara University. That summer, Bossert assumed varsity basketball coaching as well as scholastic business course instruction responsibilities at Norwood-Norfolk Central in Norfolk, New York. In his first season, #21-ranked Norwood-Norfolk finished 20–3 after losing to No. 1-ranked 25–0 Rensselaer in the New York State Public High School Athletic Association Region 2 Class C championship game at Rensselaer Polytechnic Institute 's Houston Field House. Bossert earned the 1990 Section 10 Class C coach of the year. His second season ended with a 19–5 record when he forfeited with 56 second remaining in the 3rd quarter against Saranac Central in the Class C intersectional round after earning two technical fouls in the first quarter, and objecting to a player technical in the third quarter. In the game Norwood-Norfolk was representing section 10, while Saranac and both referees were from section 7. Bossert recorded a 16–6 1991–92 season losing in a Class C boys' basketball state regional playoff. Bossert resigned on October 21, 1992, with plans to return to Buffalo.

As of 2009, Bossert worked for a company with offices in Las Vegas and Atlantic City selling timeshares.

== Personal life ==
Bossert's father also played Division I basketball and later coached basketball, according to an article when brother Darrin was hired to coach Cedar Crest High School in 2008. Darrin Bossert played for Niagara from 1989 to 1991 and is among the school's all-time leaders with a career 39.2% three point field goal percentage. Darrin had previously played junior college basketball from 1986 to 1988 at Villa Maria College.

== See also ==
- List of NCAA Division I men's basketball players with 12 or more 3-point field goals in a game
