= Darrin Fitzgerald =

American former basketball player

Personal information
- Listed height: 5 ft 9 in (1.75 m)

Career information
- High school: George Washington (Indianapolis, Indiana)
- College: Butler (1983–1987)
- NBA draft: 1987: undrafted
- Position: Point guard / shooting guard

Career highlights
- First-team All-MCC (1987); MCC All-Freshman team (1984)

Darrin Fitzgerald is an American former basketball player who is known for his collegiate career at Butler University. Between 1983–84 and 1986–87, Fitzgerald scored 2,019 points, which is the third highest total in school history. He is 5'9" and played the point guard and shooting guard positions.

Fitzgerald is known as a prolific three-point shooter. He possessed the ability to make long-distance jump shots, and during his senior year, the National Collegiate Athletic Association (NCAA) officially introduced three-pointers into college basketball. Fitzgerald took full advantage as he made an NCAA-record 158 threes in a single season (since broken by Stephen Curry in 2007–08), while his 5.64 made threes per game is a still-standing record (the next closest per-game average is a distant 4.96). He made more three-point field goals than all but 20 of the NCAA Division I teams that season. Also in his senior year, Fitzgerald scored 54 points against Detroit, which is another school record. In all four seasons Fitzgerald led Butler in assists.

Fitzgerald also shared the record of NCAA Division I single-game, three-point shots with Gary Bossert as of February 9, 1987, with a 12–22 game against Detroit in a Division I Midwestern Collegiate Conference (now Horizon League) contest. That record was surpassed December 21, 1989 when Dave Jamerson went 14-for-17 for the Ohio Bobcats of the Mid-American Conference against NCAA Division II's Charleston Golden Eagles.

Fitzgerald was not selected in the 1987 NBA draft. George Irvine, director of player personnel for the Indiana Pacers, explained that teams did not often consider small guards and "his reputation as a scorer may have hurt him" by not being a playmaker. Fitzgerald played for an Amateur Athletic Union (AAU) team based in Flint, Michigan, after his collegiate career until he chose to retire by the time he was 25. He found work as a foundry technician at a Daimler-Chrysler plant in Indianapolis.

Fitzgerald has five children. On September 23, 2000, his daughter, LaKeisha, was fatally shot during a robbery attempt.

== See also ==
- List of NCAA Division I men's basketball season 3-point field goal leaders
- List of NCAA Division I men's basketball players with 12 or more 3-point field goals in a game
