= Dave Jamerson =

American basketball player (born 1967)

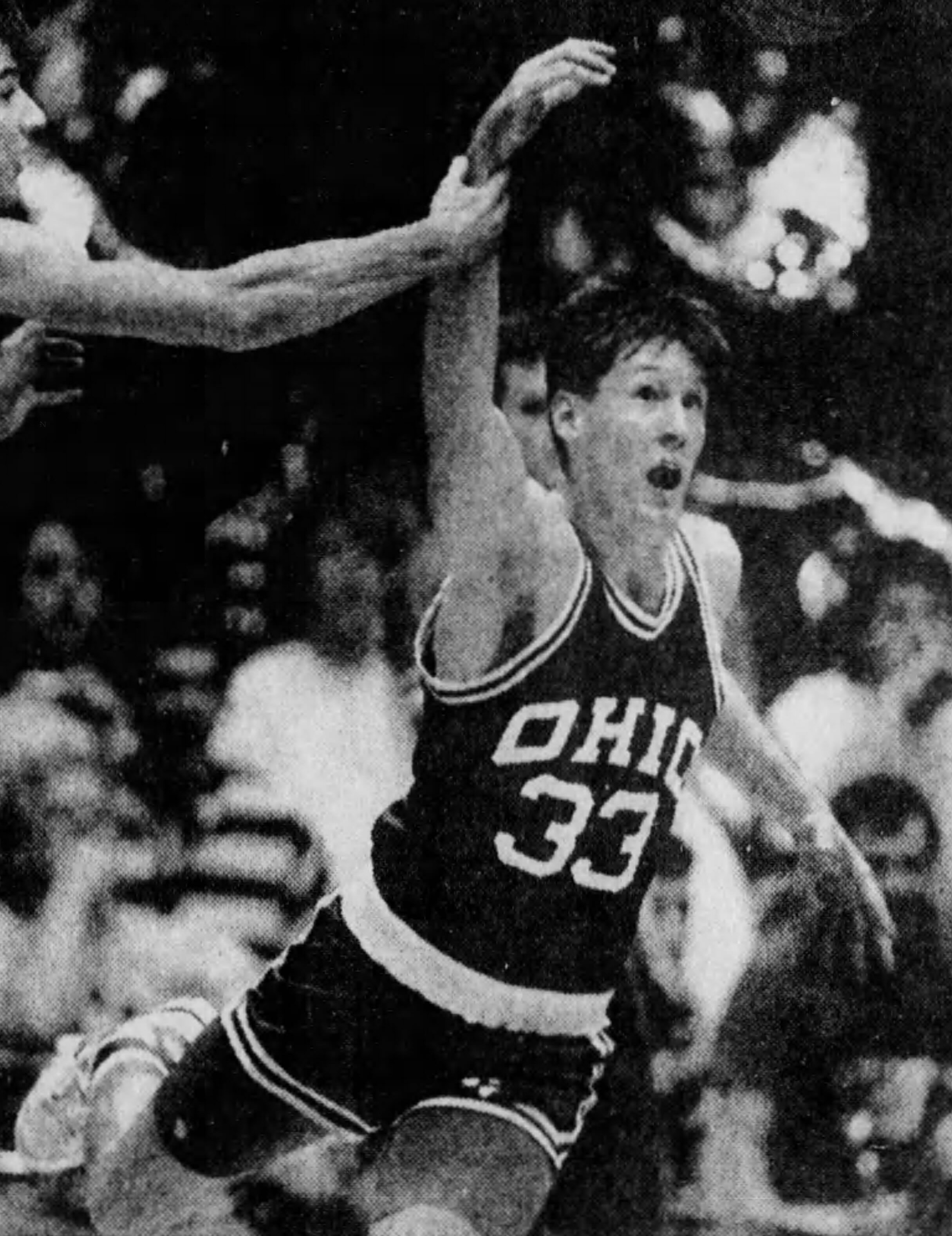
- Jamerson in 1989

Personal information
- Born: August 13, 1967 (age 59) Clarksburg, West Virginia, U.S.
- Listed height: 6 ft 5 in (1.96 m)
- Listed weight: 190 lb (86 kg)

Career information
- High school: Stow (Stow, Ohio)
- College: Ohio (1985–1990)
- NBA draft: 1990: 1st round, 15th overall pick
- Drafted by: Miami Heat
- Playing career: 1990–1995
- Position: Shooting guard
- Number: 32, 22, 24

Career history
- 1990–1992: Houston Rockets
- 1993: Utah Jazz
- 1993–1994: Omaha Racers
- 1994: Rochester Renegade
- 1994: New Jersey Nets
- 1994: Harrisburg Hammerheads
- 1995: Rapid City Thrillers

Career highlights
- MAC Player of the Year (1990); First-team All-MAC (1990); Second-team All-MAC (1989); No. 33 retired by Ohio Bobcats; First-team Academic All-America (1990)
- Stats at NBA.com
- Stats at Basketball Reference
Medals
Men's basketball
Representing United States
Pan American Games
Silver medal – second place	1995 Mar del Plata	Team competition

John David Jamerson (born August 13, 1967) is an American former professional basketball player who was selected by the Miami Heat in the first round (15th pick overall) of the 1990 NBA draft. Jamerson played for the Houston Rockets, Utah Jazz and New Jersey Nets in three National Basketball Association (NBA) seasons as well as four Continental Basketball Association (CBA) teams.

Jamerson was the first NCAA Division I men's basketball player to make 14 three-point shots in a single game. Although this NCAA record for most single-game three-point shots made has been eclipsed, his name remains listed several times in the annual NCAA Division I Men's Basketball Record Book. Jamerson remains the Mid-American Conference (MAC) single-season three-point shots made (total 131 or 4.68/game), single-game three-point shots made (14, shared), single-game scoring (60) and single conference game scoring (52, shared) record holder. He also set the MAC single-tournament record for free throws made without a miss (15). Additionally, holds several Ohio Bobcat school records. He formerly held the MAC single-season scoring record (874, 1989-90, broken in 2017)

As a college basketball senior, Jamerson finished third in the nation in scoring (31.2 points/game) and first in three-point shots/game with (4.68). He was the 1990 Mid-American Conference Men's Basketball Player of the Year as well as a 1990 Academic All-America selection. In addition to his three-point shooting excellence, he once led the MAC and once led the Continental Basketball Association in free throw shooting percentage. In high school, he was an All-Ohio first team selection.

== High school career ==
Jamerson graduated from Stow-Munroe Falls High School. As a senior, he averaged 34 points per game. He also averaged 5 rebounds, 5 assists, a 58% field goal percentage and 85% free throw percentage. He was an Associated Press 1985 Class AAA All-Ohio first team selection and the Northeast Ohio Class AAA player of the year (Jerome Lane was the NEO Class AA player of the year). Jamerson played two years of high school varsity basketball. By the fall of his senior year when he committed to Ohio he had received scholarship offers from Kent State, Penn State, St. Bonaventure and Akron. As a senior, his team won 22 consecutive games before losing in the Class AAA District Tournament semifinal to Central-Hower High School 75–62.

== College career ==
After his freshman season for the 1985–86 Bobcats during which he averaged 14 points per game, he injured a knee on the team 1986 10-game European summer trip and missed the entire season. For the 1986–87 NCAA Division I men's basketball season the National Collegiate Athletic Association introduced the three-point shot.

Jamerson returned as a redshirt sophomore for the 1987–88 Bobcats. On November 28, 1987, he scored a then career-high 39 points, while Scott Tedder scored 50 points leading Ohio Wesleyan to an upset over the Bobcats. Jamerson was an honorable mention All-MAC honoree when his 85.1% free throw percentage led the MAC. As of 2018, his 1988 MAC men's basketball tournament 15–15 free throw performance remained a Mid-American Conference men's basketball tournament single-tournament record. He was a member of the 1988 All-MAC Tournament team.

On February 25, 1989, Jamerson connected from 61 feet (18.6 m) with 1 second left in overtime to finish with 21 points and give Ohio a 77–74 victory over Toledo. He was second team All-MAC as a junior. He was a 1989 Academic All-MAC honoree for the 1988–89 team.

On December 21, 1989, against the Golden Eagles of the University of Charleston, Jamerson set a single-game record by becoming the first NCAA Division I men's basketball player to make fourteen three-point shots in a game (surpassing Gary Bossert's January 7, 1987, NCAA Division I record total of 12). He went 14–17 and had a streak of 9 consecutive three-point shots in the first half. Before head coach Larry Hunter removed him with 8:33 to remaining to play, he scored 60 points in the Ohio victory, which set Ohio Bobcat, Convocation Center arena and Mid-American Conference (MAC) single-game point total records. Jamerson scored 40 points on December 29, 1989, to keep Ohio in the contest against Washington State until they surrendered a three-point play with 1 second left to lose 72–69. The following night Jamerson scored 39 to lead Ohio to a comeback win against Fordham. He shot 8 for 16 on three pointers including four consecutive late in the first half to cut the deficit to 39–35. Jamerson was the nation's second leading scorer when he posted 52 points against Kent State on February 24, 1990. That tied the MAC single-conference game scoring record set twice by Jimmy Darrow and was the most points ever scored either for or against Kent State. As a senior for the 1989–90 Bobcats, Jamerson was a first team All-MAC honoree when he led the MAC in scoring (31.2) and three-point shots per game (4.68). He also earned a spot on the 1990 All-MAC Tournament team. Jamerson was also a First team 1990 Academic All-America selection and repeated as an Academic All-MAC selection. He led the 1989–90 Bobcats in both scoring with 874 pts (31.2 ppg/28 gms.) and rebounding 179 rebs. (6.4 rpg/28 games). That year he played alongside teammate Tom Jamerson, his younger brother.

After his college career at Ohio, Jamerson was underestimated despite finishing third nationally in scoring because the school had not produced an NBA player since Howie Jolliff in the early 1960s. He participated in the Portsmouth Invitational Tournament, earning tournament MVP honors and a late invitation to the Orlando All-Star Classic. Jamerson turned heads both on hot shooting nights and his off games when he had to demonstrate his all around game during the summer all-star circuit.

=== Legacy ===
Jamerson's 60-point/14-three point shot performance established several records. The previous school single-game record had been 45 by Fred Moore in 1957. The previous conference record had been 53 by Tommie Johnson. Scott Tedder of Ohio Wesleyan set the arena record with 50 points on November 28, 1987, which still stood as the visiting player record as of 2023. His NCAA record total of 14 three-point shots was not matched until Askia Jones went 14–18 on March 24, 1994, for Kansas State of the Big Eight Conference against Fresno State of NCAA Division I Western Athletic Conference. It was not surpassed until Keith Veney posted 15 on December 14, 1996, for Marshall of the Southern Conference against Morehead State of the Ohio Valley Conference.

Also as of 2018, his single-season three-point shot total of 131 and average of 4.68 per game were still standing conference records. His single-season point total of 874 stood as a conference record from 1990 until 2017 when Marcus Keene posted 959. His conference record 14 single-game three point shots was tied by Ronald Blackshear on March 1, 2002, but had not been surpassed as of the beginning of the 2018–19 season. When his college basketball eligibility expired, his career total of 2,336 points was second in MAC history to Ron Harper (2,377). Since no MAC player had scored 52 points since he tied the conference single-game scoring record, he still shared that record as of 2018.

Jamerson is listed five times in the NCAA's 2022-23 Division I Men's Basketball Record book: 1.) 3rd in scoring in 1990 31.2 points per game, 2.) 1990 national leader with 4.68 three-point shots per game, 3.) the 60-point game is listed as tied for 13th in the annual top 25 update for single-game scoring highs (vs. Non-DI), 4.) 14 single-game three point shots made is listed as tied for 4th in annual top 25 update, and 5.) 4.68 single-season three point shots per game is listed 6th in the annual top 25 update.

According to the Ohio Men's Basketball 2023–24 Record Book Jamerson currently holds the following school records: career points (2,336), career field goals made (864), single-season points (874), single-season scoring average (31.4), single-season three-point shots made (131), single-game points (first and second with 60 and 52), single-game field goals made (21 and 20), single-game three point field goals made (14 and 11), single-game three-point field goal percentage (5–5=100%), Per the same source, he formerly held the following school records: career three-point field goals made (239, surpassed by Tommy Freeman 2011), career three-point field goal percentage (41.9%, surpassed by Freeman 2011 44.3%), single-season field-goals made (297, surpassed by Gary Trent in 1994).

Many of Jamerson's records are for three-point shots. When he established his three-point shot records, the three-point line was at 19 feet 9 inches (6.02 metres), but for the 2008–09 NCAA Division I men's basketball season, the line was extended to 20 feet 9 inches (6.32 metres). For the 2019–20 NCAA Division I men's basketball season, the line was further extended to 22 feet 1.75 inches (6.75 metres).

Jamerson's #33 jersey was retired during halftime in a banner-raising ceremony during a January 24, 2007, game at Ohio University' Convocation Center. He was inducted into the Ohio Athletics Hall of Fame in 1995. In 2015, he was inducted into the Ohio Basketball Hall of Fame. At the time he had a wife and four children.

== Professional career ==
Jamerson became the first Ohio Bobcat to be selected in the first round of the NBA draft when he was selected 15th overall in the 1990 NBA draft by the Miami Heat before he was traded with 30th overall selection Carl Herrera to the Houston Rockets for the rights to 12th overall selection Alec Kessler. His father, John, had been an All-American for the Fairmont State Fighting Falcons and was drafted in the 1970 NBA draft by the Indiana Pacers. When he was due to report to October training camp, Jamerson went through a 5-day holdout before signing a 4-year $3.5 million ($8.6 million in 2025) contract.

=== Rookie year (1990–91) ===
As a rookie, he posted 12 points on January 8, 1991, against the Portland Trail Blazers. He matched this output in the April 25, 1991 NBA playoffs opening game 94–92 loss to the Los Angeles Lakers with 12 points that included 6–6 free throw shooting. Head coach Don Chaney inserted Jamerson in the backcourt with Sleepy Floyd for unusually meaningful time in the second quarter when the Rockets were down by 11 points. While he was in the game, the Rockets cut the lead to 7 and the rested starters returned to cut the lead to 1 by halftime. In that game, Jamerson and Terry Teagle got tangled up in the second quarter and Teagle threw two punches at Jamerson. Teagle was ejected, fined $7500 ($17728 in 2025) and suspended from game 2. Jamerson did not respond and was not penalized.

=== Peak year (1991–92) ===
His best year as a pro came during the 1991-92 NBA season as a member of the Rockets, when he appeared in 48 games and averaged 4.0 ppg. That season, he twice posted double digit scoring in back-to-back appearances. In the first of these, double digit pairs, he boosted his career high to 13 points and added 8 assists against the on December 30, 1991, against the Cleveland Cavaliers. In the second of these pairs, he posted his NBA career-high 16 points in 9 minutes of play against the Denver Nuggets on April 2, 1992.

=== Comeback attempt (1992–95) ===
In the 1992 offseason, Jamerson sprained his medial collateral ligament and tore his anterior cruciate ligament during a pickup game, causing him to miss the 1992-93 NBA season. The Rockets waived Jamerson on November 2 after their 1993 training camp triggering a delayed payment of a $1 million ($2.23 million in 2025) guarantee over a period of 8 years.

When David Benoit injured his hamstring, the Utah Jazz signed Jamerson on November 13. On November 26, the Jazz decided that they needed a center or power forward to replace Benoit and waived Jamerson, subsequently signing Aaron Williams.

On December 10, Jamerson signed with the Omaha Racers of the Continental Basketball Association. On February 3, he posted a professional career-high 36 points for the Racers against the Columbus Horizon. The Racers made several trades before the February 25 trade deadline, with Jamerson ending up with the Rochester Renegades. In his CBA tenure, he averaged 12.5 points and 2.3 rebounds per game and led the CBA in free throw shooting percent (90.1%, 82 of 91).

On March 23, the New Jersey Nets signed Jamerson to a 10-day contract. He subsequently signed a second 10-day contract on April 3. After the maximum 2 10-day contracts, Jamerson was not offered a regular contract after he missed all 5 field goals with the Nets.

He played in a 1994 Summer League with the Nets. He played in the Detroit Summer League for the Minnesota Timberwolves, averaging 8.3 in three games. Then, he went to training camp with the team, officially signing on October 3. He was vying with Askia Jones for the final roster spot behind Isaiah Rider and Doug West on the depth chart. On November 2, Jamerson was waived. At some point thereafter, he joined the Harrisburg Hammerheads before being traded with Ronnie Grandison to the Rapid City Thrillers for three 1995 draft picks, Winston Garland and $20,000 ($42258 in 2025) on January 4, 1995.

=== International play (1995) ===
Players from the CBA, including Jamerson, Rumeal Robinson, Brian Davis, Mike Williams, and A.J. Wynder, were chosen to represent the United States in Basketball at the 1995 Pan American Games. The United States lost the gold medal game 90–86 to Argentina men's national basketball team.

=== Later years (1996–) ===
In 1996, Jamerson was a member of the Fellowship of Christian Athletes-affiliated Sportspower International touring team along with David Magley and John Grieg.

He became an Outreach Pastor at Traders Point Christian Church in Indianapolis, Indiana. As of 2009, he was the pastor of Renovate Church in Cedar Park, Texas.

== See also ==
- List of NCAA Division I men's basketball players with 60 or more points in a game
- List of NCAA Division I men's basketball players with 12 or more 3-point field goals in a game
- List of NCAA Division I men's basketball season 3-point field goal leaders
- List of NCAA Division I men's basketball career scoring leaders
- Ohio Bobcats men's basketball statistical leaders
