= Billy Hahn =

American basketball coach (1953–2023)

Biographical details
- Born: June 22, 1953; Mishawaka, Indiana, U.S.
- Died: April 7, 2023 (aged 69)

Playing career
- 1971–1974: Maryland
- Position: Point guard

Coaching career (HC unless noted)
- 1974–1975: Morris Harvey (assistant)
- 1975–1976: Davidson (assistant)
- 1976–1979: Rhode Island (assistant)
- 1979–1986: Ohio (assistant)
- 1986–1989: Ohio
- 1989–2001: Maryland (assistant)
- 2001–2004: La Salle
- 2007–2017: West Virginia (assistant)

Head coaching record
- Overall: 79–99

Billy Hahn (June 22, 1953 – April 7, 2023) was an American basketball coach who was an assistant coach for the West Virginia Mountaineers under head coach Bob Huggins. During his head coaching and assistant coaching career, Hahn has coached and recruited 19 future NBA players and set various school records at Maryland with numerous NCAA Tournament appearances over his career.

== Early life ==
Born in Mishawaka, Indiana, Hahn graduated from Penn High then attended the University of Maryland. During his tenure at Maryland, Hahn was a three-year letterwinner on three of the greatest teams in Terrapins' history. As a freshman, he played on the Terps team that won the 1971 National Invitation Tournament. That season, he played as a key reserve off the bench. Hahn was team captain during his senior season and was part of the 1974–1975 squad that went 24–5. Hahn graduated from Maryland with a bachelor's degree in distributive education and a minor in business administration in 1975.

== Coaching career ==
=== Morris Harvey College and Davidson ===
Hahn began his coaching career at Morris Harvey College in 1975 as an assistant coach under Rick Meckfessel. In 1976, Hahn became an assistant coach at Davidson College.

=== Rhode Island ===
After his season at Davidson, Hahn became an assistant coach at Rhode Island, where he helped the team to the NCAA tournament in 1978, and the NIT in 1979.

Hahn recruited and coached future NBA player Sly Williams while at Rhode Island.

=== Ohio ===
In 1980, Hahn left Rhode Island for the assistant coaching position at Ohio University under Danny Nee. During his six-year tenure, the Bobcats won the Mid-American Conference Championship in 1983 and 1985 and went to the NCAA tournament in both of the seasons. In 1986, Hahn helped the Bobcats to the NIT.

After the 1986 season, Hahn was named head coach. He led the Bobcats to the MAC Championship Game in 1988. During his head coaching tenure, he recruited and coached the school's all-time leading scorer, Dave Jamerson, and the MAC Player of the Year in 1989, Paul Graham.

=== Maryland ===
After his head coaching stint at Ohio University ended following the 1989 season, Hahn returned to his alma mater, the University of Maryland, to become the assistant coach under Gary Williams. During his tenure from 1989 to 2001, Hahn's Terps went to the NCAA tournament a school-record eight straight years, including the 2001 Final Four. The Terps also finished fourth or higher in the ACC eight consecutive seasons and established school records for regular season victories, 28 in 1999, and ACC victories in a season, 13 in 1999.

Hahn was promoted to associate head coach in 1997 and became the leading recruiter and scout along with his on-court coaching duties. During the tenure, he coached Walt Williams, Joe Smith, and Steve Francis, who all became NBA Lottery draft selections. He was also named one of the top ten recruiters in the eastern United States by Eastern Basketball.

The year after he left, 2002, the Terps won the national championship with most of Hahn's recruits. He was given a championship ring by Williams and the Terrapins basketball squad, even though he was not associated with the school anymore.

Hahn coached future NBA players Tony Massenburg, Jerrod Mustaf, Keith Booth, Sarunas Jasikevicius, Laron Profit, Terence Morris, Obinna Ekezie, Steve Francis, Chris Wilcox, Lonny Baxter, Steve Blake, and Juan Dixon, at Maryland.

=== La Salle ===
==== Tenure ====
Hahn was hired as La Salle's men's basketball coach in 2001, succeeding longtime coach Speedy Morris. In each of his three seasons at La Salle, Hahn's Explorers had losing records. While at La Salle, Hahn coached NBA players Steven Smith and Rasual Butler.

==== Scandal and resignation ====
Hahn was forced to resign in 2004 when a women's basketball player claimed he discouraged her from reporting a rape she said occurred in April 2003 that allegedly involved one of Hahn's players. Hahn claimed that the woman didn't want to report the incident at the time. However, La Salle school policy required Hahn to report the incident to a counselor. This was to ensure compliance with the Clery Act, a federal law which requires colleges to make timely reports of crime on campus. La Salle women's basketball head coach John Miller was also forced to resign on the same day as Hahn, also for not reporting the alleged rape.

=== West Virginia ===
After spending three seasons out of coaching, Hahn was hired by new head coach, Bob Huggins, at West Virginia University in April 2007. Hahn and Huggins had been rivals, when Huggins coached Akron.

In Hahn's first season with the team, the Mountaineers finished the regular season with a 22–9 record. The team also advanced to the semifinals of the Big East tournament and the Sweet Sixteen of the NCAA tournament, which included a second round victory over the #2-seed Duke Blue Devils. Hahn retired from coaching after the 2017 season.

== Personal life and death ==
Hahn's son Matt, was a reserve on the Maryland basketball team from 1996–2000. He served as an assistant coach at IUP, Robert Morris, and Vermont.

Hahn suffered a heart attack and died on April 7, 2023, at the age of 69.

== Head coaching record ==
Record table
Season	Team	Overall	Conference	Standing	Postseason
Ohio Bobcats (Mid-American Conference) (1986–1989)
1986–87	Ohio	14–14	7–9	6th	
1987–88	Ohio	16–14	9–7	3rd	
1988–89	Ohio	12–17	5–11	7th	
Ohio:		42–45	21–27		
La Salle Explorers (Atlantic 10 Conference) (2001–2004)
2001–02	La Salle	15–17	6–10	4th	
2002–03	La Salle	12–17	5–11	4th	
2003–04	La Salle	10–20	5–11	6th	
La Salle:		37–54	16–32		
Total:		79–99			
