= 1988–89 Ball State Cardinals men's basketball team =

American college basketball season

1988–89 Ball State Cardinals men's basketball

MAC regular season champions MAC tournament champions

NCAA tournament, Second Round
- Conference: Mid-American Conference

Ranking
- AP: No. 18
- Record: 29–3 (14–2 MAC)
- Head coach: Rick Majerus (2nd season)
- Assistant coaches: Dick Hunsaker; Leonard Drake; Tim Hopfensperger; Kirk Earlywine
- MVP: Curtis Kidd
- Home arena: Irving Gymnasium

1988–89 Mid-American Conference men's basketball standings
	Conf.				Overall
Team	W		L	PCT	W		L	PCT
No. 18 Ball State †	14	–	2	.875	29	–	3	.906
Kent State	12	–	4	.750	21	–	10	.677
Toledo	11	–	5	.688	18	–	13	.581
Eastern Michigan	8	–	8	.500	17	–	12	.586
Central Michigan	7	–	9	.438	13	–	15	.464
Bowling Green	7	–	9	.438	13	–	15	.464
Western Michigan	6	–	10	.375	12	–	16	.429
Ohio	6	–	10	.375	13	–	16	.448
Miami (OH)	1	–	15	.063	5	–	23	.179
† 1989 MAC tournament winner Rankings from AP poll

The 1988–89 Ball State Cardinals men's basketball team represented Ball State University as a member of the Mid-American Conference during the 1988–89 NCAA Division I men's basketball season. Led by second-year head coach Rick Majerus, Ball State played stifling defense en route to one of the best seasons in the school's history, including a school-record 29 wins and the first NCAA Tournament win in program history. The Cardinals won MAC regular season and tournament titles, advanced to the second round of the NCAA tournament, and finished the season with a 29–3 record (14–2 MAC).

== Roster ==
1988–89 Ball State Cardinals men's basketball team
Players
Coaches

Pos.	#	Name	Height	Weight	Year	Previous school	Hometown
F	42	Paris McCurdy	6 ft 7 in (2.01 m)	220 lb (100 kg)	Jr	Cooley	Detroit, MI
F	4	Chandler Thompson	6 ft 3 in (1.91 m)	220 lb (100 kg)	Fr	Muncie Central	Muncie, IN
C	44	Curtis Kidd	6 ft 9 in (2.06 m)	235 lb (107 kg)	Jr	Cooley	Detroit, MI
G	30	Billy Butts	6 ft 3 in (1.91 m)	190 lb (86 kg)	Jr	Muncie Northside	Muncie, IN
F		Rick Hall (C)	6 ft 8 in (2.03 m)	—	Sr
F	31	Greg Miller	6 ft 8 in (2.03 m)	220 lb (100 kg)	Jr	Yorktown	Yorktown, IN
F	33	Shawn Parrish	6 ft 5 in (1.96 m)	205 lb (93 kg)	Jr	Vincennes University; Owen Valley	Spencer, IN
C	32	Roman Muller	7 ft 1 in (2.16 m)	230 lb (104 kg)	Jr	Wisconsin Dells	Wisconsin Dells, WI
G	22	Mike Spicer	5 ft 11 in (1.8 m)	180 lb (82 kg)	Fr	Central	Grand Rapids, MI
G	35	Dave Barber	6 ft 1 in (1.85 m)	175 lb (79 kg)	Jr	Daleville	Muncie, IN
G	20	Scott Nichols	6 ft 1 in (1.85 m)	195 lb (88 kg)	Jr	St. Martin Deporres	Detroit, IN
G	25	Rodney Haynes	6 ft 0 in (1.83 m)	175 lb (79 kg)	Jr	Chrysler	New Castle, IN
G	11	Mike Giunta	6 ft 4 in (1.93 m)	195 lb (88 kg)	Fr	Carmel, IN
G	23	Keith Stalling	6 ft 3 in (1.91 m)	215 lb (98 kg)	So	Dunbar	Chicago IL

Head coach

- Rick Majerus (Marquette)

Assistant coach(es)

- Dick Hunsaker (Weber State)
- Leonard Drake (Central Michigan)
- Tim Hopfensperger (UW–Platteville)
- Kirk Earlywine (Campbell)

Legend

- (C) Team captain
- (S) Suspended
- (I) Ineligible
- (W) Walk-on
- Injured
- Current redshirt

== Schedule and results ==
Date time, TV	Rank^{#}	Opponent^{#}	Result	Record	Site city, state
Non-conference regular season
Nov 26, 1988*		at Minnesota	W 63–57	1–0	Williams Arena; Minneapolis, Minnesota
Nov 29, 1988*		Cardinal Stritch	W 95–53	2–0	Irving Gymnasium; Muncie, Indiana
Dec 2, 1988*		U.S. International	W 85–66	3–0	Irving Gymnasium; Muncie, Indiana
Dec 3, 1988*		Florida A&M	W 76–52	4–0	Irving Gymnasium; Muncie, Indiana
Dec 7, 1988*		Indiana State	W 80–56	5–0	Irving Gymnasium; Muncie, Indiana
Dec 10, 1988*		Purdue	W 70–56	6–0	Irving Gymnasium; Muncie, Indiana
Dec 13, 1988*		at Valparaiso	W 63–56	7–0	Athletics-Recreation Center; Valparaiso, Indiana
Dec 21, 1988*		at Florida International	W 89–66	8–0	Golden Panther Arena; Miami, Florida
Dec 22, 1988*		vs. Northwestern	W 77–71	9–0	Golden Panther Arena; Miami, Florida
Dec 28, 1988*		Texas State	W 75–59	10–0	Irving Gymnasium; Muncie, Indiana
MAC regular season
Jan 4, 1989		Western Michigan	W 65–63	11–0 (1–0)	Irving Gymnasium; Muncie, Indiana
Jan 7, 1989		at Ohio	L 57–71	11–1 (1–1)	Convocation Center; Athens, Ohio
Jan 11, 1989		Central Michigan	W 77–56	12–1 (2–1)	Irving Gymnasium; Muncie, Indiana
Jan 14, 1989		at Bowling Green	W 79–73	13–1 (3–1)	Anderson Arena; Bowling Green, Ohio
Jan 18, 1989		Toledo	L 46–49	13–2 (3–2)	Irving Gymnasium; Muncie, Indiana
Jan 21, 1989*		at Butler	W 54–44	14–2	Hinkle Fieldhouse; Indianapolis, Indiana
Jan 25, 1989		Kent State	W 78–62	15–2 (4–2)	Irving Gymnasium; Muncie, Indiana
Jan 28, 1989		at Eastern Michigan	W 68–66	16–2 (5–2)	Bowen Field House; Ypsilanti, Michigan
Feb 1, 1989		at Miami (OH)	W 66–51	17–2 (6–2)	Millett Hall; Oxford, Ohio
Feb 4, 1989		Ohio	W 80–70	18–2 (7–2)	Irving Gymnasium; Muncie, Indiana
Feb 8, 1989		at Central Michigan	W 66–65	19–2 (8–2)	Rose Arena; Mount Pleasant, Michigan
Feb 11, 1989		Bowling Green	W 64–51	20–2 (9–2)	Irving Gymnasium; Muncie, Indiana
Feb 15, 1989*		at Toledo	W 74–69	21–2 (10–2)	John F. Savage Hall; Toledo, Ohio
Feb 22, 1989	No. 20	at Kent State	W 73–61	22–2 (11–2)	MAC Center; Kent, Ohio
Feb 25, 1989	No. 20	Eastern Michigan	W 76–63	23–2 (12–2)	Irving Gymnasium; Muncie, Indiana
Mar 1, 1989	No. 19	Miami (OH)	W 78–60	24–2 (13–2)	Irving Gymnasium; Muncie, Indiana
Mar 4, 1989	No. 19	at Western Michigan	W 92–79	25–2 (14–2)	University Arena; Kalamazoo, Michigan
MAC tournament
Mar 10, 1989*	No. 19	vs. Ohio; MAC Tournament Quarterfinal	W 62–46	26–2	John F. Savage Hall; Toledo, Ohio
Mar 11, 1989*	No. 19	vs. Eastern Michigan; MAC Tournament Semifinal	W 77–76	27–2	John F. Savage Hall; Toledo, Ohio
Mar 12, 1989*	No. 19	vs. Kent State; MAC tournament championship	W 67–65	28–2	John F. Savage Hall; Toledo, Ohio
NCAA tournament
Mar 16, 1989*	(9 MW) No. 18	vs. (8 MW) Pittsburgh; First round	W 68–64	29–2	RCA Dome; Indianapolis, Indiana
Mar 18, 1989*	(9 MW) No. 18	vs. (1 MW) No. 3 Illinois; Second round	L 60–72	29–3	RCA Dome (37,444); Indianapolis, Indiana
*Non-conference game. ^{#}Rankings from AP Poll. (#) Tournament seedings in parentheses. MW=Midwest. All times are in Eastern Time.
