= Timothy Pollard =

American basketball player

Personal information
- Born: Clarksdale, Mississippi, U.S.
- Listed height: 6 ft 3 in (1.91 m)

Career information
- College: Coahoma CC (1984–1986); Mississippi Valley State (1986–1988)
- NBA draft: 1988: undrafted
- Position: Shooting guard

Timothy Pollard is an American former basketball player. He is best known for being a prolific three-point field goal shooter while playing for Mississippi Valley State University between 1986–87 and 1987–88. Pollard was a two-time NCAA Division I three-point field goals made per game leader in each of his two seasons playing for the Delta Devils. As a junior, he made 4.71 per game, and then as a senior he made 4.43 per game. Pollard, a 6 ft 3 in (1.91 m) shooting guard, is a native of Clarksdale, Mississippi and played his first two seasons of college basketball at the junior college level. His 4.71 makes per game were a Division I record for juniors until Terrence Woods of Florida A&M broke it in 2003 by hitting 4.96 per game.

In one December 1986 game against Illinois, Pollard made 8 of 17 three-point attempts, all in the second half, en route to a game-high 30 points. His eight three-pointers made set a then-Assembly Hall record.
