= 1989–90 Ball State Cardinals men's basketball team =

American college basketball season

1989–90 Ball State Cardinals men's basketball

MAC regular season champions MAC tournament champions

NCAA tournament, Sweet Sixteen
- Conference: Mid-American Conference
- Record: 26–7 (13–3 MAC)
- Head coach: Dick Hunsaker (1st season)
- Assistant coach: Leonard Drake
- MVP: Paris McCurdy
- Home arena: Irving Gymnasium

1989–90 Mid-American Conference men's basketball standings
	Conf.				Overall
Team	W		L	PCT	W		L	PCT
Ball State†	13	–	3	.813	26	–	7	.788
Kent State	12	–	4	.750	21	–	8	.724
Miami	9	–	7	.563	14	–	15	.483
Bowling Green	9	–	7	.563	18	–	11	.621
Eastern Michigan	8	–	8	.500	19	–	13	.594
Toledo	7	–	9	.438	12	–	16	.429
Central Michigan	6	–	10	.375	13	–	17	.433
Ohio	5	–	11	.313	12	–	16	.429
Western Michigan	3	–	13	.188	9	–	18	.333
† 1990 MAC tournament winner Rankings from AP Poll

The 1989–90 Ball State Cardinals men's basketball team represented Ball State University as a member of the Mid-American Conference during the 1989–90 NCAA Division I men's basketball season. After the departure of head coach Rick Majerus, Ball State responded under new coach Dick Hunsaker by having the best season in the school's history. This group of Cardinals became the first team in the Mid-American Conference history to win two consecutive MAC regular season conference championships as well as back-to-back conference tournament titles. The 1990 Ball State basketball team also became the first team in the MAC to reach the Sweet 16 of the NCAA Tournament in its current format. The Cardinals lost in the Sweet 16 to the eventual national champions UNLV Runnin' Rebels, 69–67.

The team was led by many transfer players and two of Coach Hunsaker's key transfers, starting forwards Paris McCurdy and Curtis Kidd, were high school teammates. They both signed to play their college ball at the University of Arkansas-Little Rock. However, because of disciplinary reasons, the two had to find a new school. Former coach Rick Majerus gave them a second chance, and they came through. The two became the key assets to Ball States Sweet 16 run.

The Cardinals finished the regular season at 24–6 before heading to the NCAA tournament. The Cardinals were a 12 seed and began the tournament at the Huntsman Center in Salt Lake City. They upset the Oregon State Beavers in what was star point guard Gary Payton’s last game in college. They won the game when McCurdy made a three-point play with no time left. Ball State then had to play the Louisville Cardinals next. They ended up defeating Louisville late in the game by a final score of 62–60. Meanwhile, in Muncie, fans stormed the village (the center of Ball State's off campus social scene) after the win. Ball State advanced to face the top-seeded UNLV Runnin' Rebels. Ball State shut down one of the best offenses in college basketball history and had a chance to win it in the final seconds. Down by two, the Cards made a deep pass to tie or take the lead but it was picked off.

== Roster ==
1989–90 Ball State Cardinals men's basketball team
Players
Coaches

Pos.	#	Name	Height	Weight	Year	Previous school	Hometown
F	42	Paris McCurdy (C)	6 ft 7 in (2.01 m)	220 lb (100 kg)	Sr	Cooley	Detroit, MI
F	4	Chandler Thompson	6 ft 3 in (1.91 m)	220 lb (100 kg)	So	Muncie Central	Muncie, IN
C	44	Curtis Kidd (C)	6 ft 9 in (2.06 m)	235 lb (107 kg)	Sr	Cooley	Detroit, MI
G	30	Billy Butts	6 ft 3 in (1.91 m)	190 lb (86 kg)	Sr	Muncie Northside	Muncie, IN
G	34	Emanuel Cross	6 ft 1 in (1.85 m)	205 lb (93 kg)	Jr	Westinghouse	Chicago, IL
F	31	Greg Miller	6 ft 8 in (2.03 m)	220 lb (100 kg)	Sr	Yorktown	Yorktown, IN
F	33	Shawn Parrish	6 ft 5 in (1.96 m)	205 lb (93 kg)	Sr	Vincennes University; Owen Valley	Spencer, IN
C	32	Roman Muller	7 ft 1 in (2.16 m)	230 lb (104 kg)	Sr	Wisconsin Dells	Wisconsin Dells, WI
G	22	Mike Spicer	5 ft 11 in (1.8 m)	180 lb (82 kg)	So	Central	Grand Rapids, MI
G	35	Dave Barber	6 ft 1 in (1.85 m)	175 lb (79 kg)	Sr	Daleville	Muncie, IN
G	20	Scott Nichols	6 ft 1 in (1.85 m)	195 lb (88 kg)	Sr	St. Martin Deporres	Detroit, IN
G	25	Rodney Haynes	6 ft 0 in (1.83 m)	175 lb (79 kg)	Sr	Chrysler	New Castle, IN
G	11	Mike Giunta	6 ft 4 in (1.93 m)	195 lb (88 kg)	So	Carmel, IN
G	23	Keith Stalling	6 ft 3 in (1.91 m)	215 lb (98 kg)	Jr	Dunbar	Chicago IL
G		Mark Hardwick	6 ft 2 in (1.88 m)	165 lb (75 kg)	Fr	Jay County	Dunkirk, IN
G		Trent Hicks	6 ft 2 in (1.88 m)	170 lb (77 kg)	Sr	Elwood Community High School	Elwood, IN
G		Rob Harmon	6 ft 2 in (1.88 m)	175 lb (79 kg)	Sr	Martinsville High School	Martinsville, IN

Head coach

- Dick Hunsaker (Weber State)

Assistant coach(es)

Larry Eustachy
Leonard Drake
Ron Hecklinski (part time)

Legend

- (C) Team captain
- (S) Suspended
- (I) Ineligible
- (W) Walk-on
- Injured
- Current redshirt

Roster

== Schedule and results ==
Date time, TV	Rank^{#}	Opponent^{#}	Result	Record	Site city, state
Non-conference regular season
Nov 24, 1989*		at Purdue	L 43–57	0–1	Mackey Arena; West Lafayette, IN
Nov 28, 1989*		Saginaw Valley State	W 66–45	1–1	
Dec 1, 1989*		Hardin-Simmons	W 98–70	2–1	Irving Gymnasium; Muncie, IN
Dec 2, 1989*		Coppin State	W 71–66	3–1	Irving Gymnasium; Muncie, IN
Dec 5, 1989*		at Indiana State	L 48–49	3–2	Hulman Center; Terre Haute, IN
Dec 13, 1989*		at Valparaiso	W 79–72	4–2	Athletics–Recreation Center; Valparaiso, IN
Dec 21, 1989*		Cardinal Stritch	W 116–52	5–2	
Dec 23, 1989*		at Butler	W 63–42	6–2	Irving Gymnasium; Muncie, IN
Dec 29, 1989*		vs. Memphis State; Old Style Classic	L 73–76 ^{OT}	6–3	Chicago, IL
Dec 30, 1989*		vs. Grambling; Old Style Classic	W 79–56	7–3	Chicago, IL
MAC regular season
Jan 3, 1990		at Central Michigan	W 83–60	8–3 (1–0)	Rose Arena; Mount Pleasant, MI
Jan 6, 1990		Bowling Green	W 71–65	9–3 (2–0)	Irving Gymnasium; Muncie, IN
Jan 10, 1990		at Eastern Michigan	W 85–67	10–3 (3–0)	Bowen Field House; Ypsilanti, MI
Jan 13, 1990*		Florida International	W 105–50	11–3	Irving Gymnasium; Muncie, IN
Jan 17, 1990		at Kent	L 68–71	11–4 (3–1)	Memorial Athletic and Convocation Center; Kent, OH
Jan 20, 1990		Toledo	W 59–54	12–4 (4–1)	Irving Gymnasium; Muncie, IN
Jan 24, 1990		Miami University	W 71–64	13–4 (5–1)	Irving Gymnasium; Muncie, IN
Jan 27, 1990		at Western Michigan	W 65–38	14–4 (6–1)	University Arena; Kalamazoo, MI
Jan 31, 1990		Ohio	W 77–61	15–4 (7–1)	Irving Gymnasium; Muncie, IN
Feb 3, 1990		at Bowling Green	W 45–44	16–4 (8–1)	Anderson Arena; Bowling Green, OH
Feb 7, 1990		Eastern Michigan	L 57–58	16–5 (8–2)	Irving Gymnasium; Muncie, IN
Feb 14, 1990		Kent	W 77–50	17–5 (9–2)	Irving Gymnasium; Muncie, IN
Feb 17, 1990		at Toledo	L 47–68	17–6 (9–3)	John F. Savage Hall; Toledo, OH
Feb 21, 1990		at Miami University	W 79–73	18–6 (10–3)	Millett Hall; Oxford, OH
Feb 24, 1990		Western Michigan	W 77–54	19–6 (11–3)	Irving Gymnasium; Muncie, IN
Feb 28, 1990		at Ohio	W 77–60	20–6 (12–3)	Convocation Center; Athens, OH
Mar 3, 1990		Central Michigan	W 84–57	21–6 (13–3)	Irving Gymnasium; Muncie, IN
MAC tournament
Mar 9, 1990	(1)	vs. (8) Ohio; Quarterfinals	W 77–70	22–6	Cobo Arena; Detroit, MI
Mar 10, 1990	(1)	vs. (5) Eastern Michigan; Semifinals	W 69–58	23–6	Cobo Arena; Detroit, MI
Mar 11, 1990	(1)	vs. (7) Central Michigan; Championship	W 78–56	24–6	Cobo Arena; Detroit, MI
NCAA tournament
Mar 15, 1990	(12 W)	vs. (5 W) No. 22 Oregon State; First Round	W 54–53	25–6	Jon M. Huntsman Center (10,020); Salt Lake City, UT
Mar 17, 1990	(12 W)	vs. (4 W) No. 16 Louisville; Second Round	W 62–60	26–6	Jon M. Huntsman Center; Salt Lake City, UT
Mar 23, 1990	(12 W)	vs. (1 W) No. 2 UNLV; Sweet Sixteen	L 67–69	26–7	Oakland—Alameda County Coliseum Arena; Oakland, CA
*Non-conference game. ^{#}Rankings from AP Poll. (#) Tournament seedings in parentheses. All times are in Eastern Time Source.
