= Brian Merriweather =

American former basketball player (born 1978)

Personal information
- Born: March 13, 1978 (age 47) Evansville, Indiana, U.S.
- Listed height: 6 ft 3 in (1.91 m)
- Listed weight: 185 lb (84 kg)

Career information
- High school: North (Evansville, Indiana)
- College: Cumberlands (1996–1997); Texas–Pan American (1998–2001)
- NBA draft: 2001: undrafted
- Position: Shooting guard

Career highlights
- First-team All-Independents (2000)

Brian Merriweather (born March 13, 1978) is an American former basketball player. He played professionally for Basket Rimini in Italy, but he is best known for his collegiate career at the University of Texas–Pan American (UTPA) between 1998–99 and 2000–01.

Merriweather, a 6'3" shooting guard from Evansville, Indiana, played for one season for Cumberlands College and then transferred to UTPA for his final three seasons. As a sophomore he averaged 23.7 point per game (ppg), as a junior he averaged 20.4 ppg, and as a senior he averaged 18.1 ppg; his career average was 20.7 ppg. Merriweather never played his senior season. During his UTPA career he made 332 three-point field goals in 819 attempts, both of which are UTPA records; he also made at least 7 three-pointers in a game on seven times, with a school-record career high of 9 made. In his first two seasons, Merriweather led NCAA Division I in three-pointers made per game with 4.07 each year. He finished fourth in the nation in scoring his freshman year as well. In only three collegiate seasons Merriweather amassed 1,738 points, the third-most in school history as of the end of the 2012–13 season.

Merriweather played professionally, including time spent in Italy, although he never made the cut for a National Basketball Association team.

== See also ==
- List of NCAA Division I men's basketball season 3-point field goal leaders
