= Mitch Taylor =

American basketball player

Mitchell Taylor
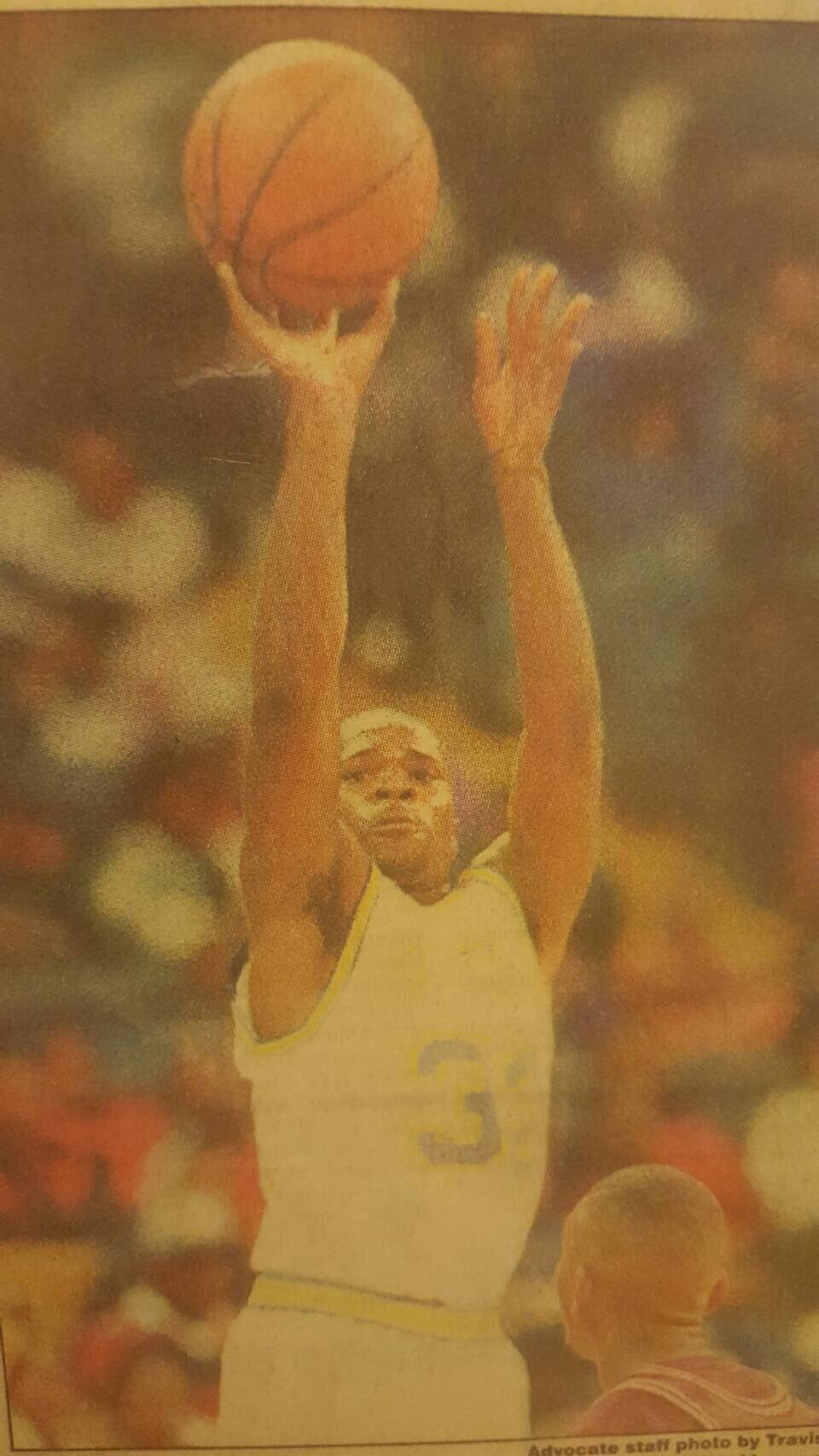

Personal information
- Born: March 31, 1973 (age 53) West Palm Beach, Florida
- Listed height: 6 ft 1 in (1.85 m)
- Listed weight: 200 lb (91 kg)

Career information
- College: Auburn (1991–1992); Southern (1993–1996)
- NBA draft: 1996: undrafted
- Position: Point guard
- Number: 12, 32

Career highlights
- NCAA 3FGM per game leader (1995); 12 three-pointers made in one game (1994)

Mitchell Taylor (born March 31, 1973) is an American former basketball player who played college basketball at Auburn University before transferring to Southern University in 1992. In his time with the Southern Jaguars basketball program, Taylor accomplished two notable achievements that have been included in the official National Collegiate Athletic Association (NCAA) Division I men's basketball record book. The first is by making 12 three-point shots in a single game, something that only 14 players in history have accomplished at the Division I level through the 2012–13 season. Taylor achieved the feat on December 1, 1994, against Baptist Christian University in which he also scored 48 points. His other accomplishment is being the officially recognized season three-pointers made per game leader in his junior season in 1994–95; in 25 games he made 109 threes, which was good for a nation-leading 4.36 per game.

He sustained an eye injury in early 1995, but still contributed as a reserve averaging over 14 points per game. He made timely big shots and one notably game winner against in-state rival, Grambling State University. Taylor was selected to play in the first annual Black College North versus South All-Star basketball game held at Georgia State Sports Arena in April 1996 in Atlanta. Virginia Union's Center Ben Wallace (former Detroit Piston) was named game's MVP.

== See also ==
- List of NCAA Division I men's basketball season 3-point field goal leaders
- List of NCAA Division I men's basketball players with 12 or more 3-point field goals in a game
