= Todd Leslie =

American basketball player (born c.1970/71)

Personal information
- Born: c. 1970/1971
- Listed height: 6 ft 5 in (1.96 m)

Career information
- High school: Fremd (Palatine, Illinois)
- College: Northwestern (1989–1994)
- NBA draft: 1994: undrafted
- Position: Guard

Todd Leslie (born c. 1970/1971) is an American former college basketball player for the Northwestern Wildcats of the Big Ten Conference. He was the first men's NCAA Division I player to make more than 11 consecutive three-point shots, establishing the current NCAA Division I consecutive three point shots made record (15). This record has stood since he set it in a four-game span in December 1990 (broke old record on December 22 and extended it on December 28). As a sophomore, he led the Big Ten Conference in three-point field goal percentage. He currently holds and formerly held several Northwestern records for three-point shots and served the team as a three-time captain. In high school, he was a top 100 recruit (#100) for the 1989 national class for William Fremd High School (Fremd).

== Early life ==
Fremd lost in the 1986 and 1987 Mid-Suburban League (MSL) championship games but finally won in 1988. The team began the 1988 Illinois High School Association (IHSA) playoffs on a 20-game winning streak with a 24–1 record matched up against Hoffman Estates High School whom they had recently defeated in the MSL championship game. As a 6 ft 4 in (1.93 m) junior, Leslie remained a bit overlooked behind the more publicized Jason Joseph and George Poorman by the time Fremd stretched its win streak to 24. Joseph was the scoring leader and Poorman (a Notre Dame football scholarship commit) was the floor leader. Leslie was a notable outside threat however. Fremd lost 72–68 in overtime in the 1988 IHSA Class AA supersectional to East Aurora High School. Leslie led the team in scoring with 27 points in the defeat. Leslie finished the season as a 73–137 (53.3%) three point shooter.

As a 6 ft 5 in (1.96 m) senior who was no longer in the shadow of his teammates, Leslie emerged as a scorer. On December 2, 1988, against Prospect High School he tallied 37. In the Elgin Holiday Basketball Tournament at the end of December 1988, Leslie had 43 against Zion-Benton Township High School, 45 points against Weber High School and totaled 134 over 4 games, which was 5 points shy of the tournament record previously established by Rob Pelinka. By February, his scoring outbursts started getting national press. His 43 points against Wheeling High School on February 3 made the USA Today High school basketball honor roll. So did his school-record 51 points on February 11 against Waukegan East. Leslie was unable to help Fremd defend its MSL title against Rolling Meadows High School on February 22. However, his 34-point performance for a 22–6 Fremd in the March 7, 1989 IHSA Class AA sectional win against Maine South High School earned a USA Today mention among "top individual performances in high school boys basketball state tournament games". Leslie's 5th 40-point game came on March 10, 1989 when he scored 43 against Streamwood High School in the IHSA Class AA sectional final 95-71 victory. Fremd had turned around a mediorcre season by winning 17 of 18 games before its run came to a halt with a 23–7 record. Fremd's season ended in a Class AA supersectional rematch against East Aurora. After a halftime tie score, East Aurora won by 19 as Leslie who had been averaging 35.2 in the IHSA playoffs was held to 27 on 6–19 shooting. He finished his senior season with a 31.3 scoring average.

Over the course of the season, he won 5 games on the final shot according to John Hersey High School coach George Zigman. Although some critics questioned his prospects for defending Division I opponents, because of his shooting abilities, his mid-March potential college choices were Wake Forest, Michigan State, Northwestern, Evansville, Drake or Colorado. He got late interest from John Thompson of Georgetown who announced his intentions to send a scout to the April 15 city-suburban all-star game at Loyola University Chicago to see Leslie after they were unable to land Matt Painter. At that time his other options seemed to be Northwestern, Evansville, Pacific and SMU. Leslie, however, signed a National Letter of Intent on April 12 with Northwestern.

Leslie was an Associated Press All-state selection. He was a Chicago area All-Academic team selection by the Chicago Sun-Times. He was the MVP of the 1989 Illinois Basketball Coaches Association Class AA All-Star Game with 20 points and 7 rebounds. Leslie finished 8th in the 1989 Illinois Mr. Basketball voting behind winner Deon Thomas and others, including Cuonzo Martin (6th). at No. 100 he was also the 8th highest rated Illinois basketball prospect in the national class of 1989. He received honorable mention recognition for the USA Today All-USA High School Basketball Team.

== College ==
For the 1986–87 NCAA Division I men's basketball season the National Collegiate Athletic Association introduced the three-point shot. On January 7, 1987, Gary Bossert set the NCAA Division I record with 11 consecutive three-point shots in single-game 12–14 performance. Leslie converted 15 straight three-point shots over a four-game span against Loyola, Morgan State, St. Louis and Boston College from December 15 to December 28, 1990 to overtake Bossert's consecutive three-point shot record, although it took about 10 days of research technology of the day to confirm this. On December 15, Leslie connected on his fifth attempt of a 2–5 three-point shooting night to start the streak against Loyola. He became the first Wildcat to go 5–5 in a game on December 21, 1990 against Morgan State. He went 6–6 the next day against St. Louis bringing his total to 12 and breaking both the NCAA Division I record for consecutive three point shots as well as the Northwestern record for most single-game three-point shots without a miss on that night. The only Wildcat to even go 5–5 since has been Kevin Coble on December 21, 2006 against Utah as of 2023. Leslie extended the NCAA consecutive three-point shots made record on December 28 by making his first 3 three-point shots against Boston College in a 3–4 performance. Two previous Big Ten Conference players had made 6 or more single-game three pointers without a miss: Doug Altenberger of Illinois had made 6 against Wisconsin on February 7, 1987. Then, Glen Rice of Michigan set the current record with 7 against Wisconsin on February 25, 1989. Then, on December 22, 1990, Leslie made 6 without a miss against St. Louis on the same night that Larry Hisle made 7 for Wisconsin against UT-Arlington.

Leslie was a three-time captain (including a redshirt season) at Northwestern. After teammate Rex Walters led the Big Ten conference in three-point field goal percentage in 1989-90, Leslie led the conference in 1990-91 with a (65–127=51.2%) season. He also led Northwestern in scoring (14.0) for the 1990–91 season and led the team in three-point field goal percentage 3 times (1990–1991, 1991–1992 & 1993–1994). His 1993–1994 80.5% (62–77) free throw percentage also led the team. He holds the Northwestern single-game (6–6=100%) and career (203–455=44.615%, tied with Walters 58–130=44.615%) three-point percentage records. He formerly held the Northwestern single-game (7, twice), single-season (77) and career three-point field goals record (203). He shared the 1992 team MVP award with teammates Kevin Rankin and Cedric Neloms. Leslie's sophomore single-season 51.2% shooting percentage was second in school history (to Rob Ross) and remains so as of 2023.

On March 1, 1992 in a loss to Iowa, Leslie became the first Wildcat to achieve seven single-game three-point shots made. His 7–11 three-point shooting performance was part of his career-high 25 point output.

In the 1992 NCAA-sanctioned Chicago Summer League, Leslie suffered a torn anterior cruciate ligament in his right knee. He returned to play his senior season for Northwestern under new head coach Ricky Byrdsong during the 1993–94 NCAA basketball season. On December 15, 1993, Leslie achieved a second single-game output of 7 three-point field goals against Youngstown State. No Wildcat would equal this output until Winston Blake did so on January 27, 2001 against Michigan. No Wildcat would surpass this total until Craig Moore made 8 on February 26, 2008 against Michigan. In March of that season, the Wildcats got some key wins against Wisconsin and Michigan to earn a bid to the 1994 National Invitation Tournament. In the opening round Northwestern hosted cross-town DePaul and overcame a 12-point halftime deficit to win by a point. In the second round Northwestern hosted Xavier and lost in overtime. Leslie's 1994 single-season total of 77 three-point field goals stood as a Northwestern single-season record until 1998 when Sean Wink totaled 86.

Leslie's records are for three-point shots. When he established his three-point shot records, the NCAA Division I three-point line was at 19 feet 9 inches (6.02 metres), but for the 2008–09 NCAA Division I men's basketball season, the line was extended to 20 feet 9 inches (6.32 metres). For the 2019–20 NCAA Division I men's basketball season, the line was further extended to 22 feet 1.75 inches (6.75 metres).

== Professional career ==
The inaugural season of the Chicago Rockers in the Continental Basketball Association was supposed to feature local talent. However, neither UIC's Kenny Williams nor Northwestern's Leslie made the opening day roster. However, a few months into the season, Leslie was described as "hanging on with the Chicago Rockers. . .as a non-roster player".

== Personal life ==
Leslie's father, Dick, was the Chicago Tribune sports editor at the time he broke the record.
