= List of NCAA Division I men's basketball players with 12 or more 3-point field goals in a game =

A three-point field goal (also known as a "three-pointer" or "3-pointer") is a field goal in a basketball game, made from beyond the three-point line, a designated arc radiating from the basket. A successful attempt is worth three points, in contrast to the two points awarded for shots made inside the three-point line. The National Collegiate Athletic Association (NCAA) keeps records of the Division I 3-point field made in a game leaders. The statistic was first recognized in the 1986–87 season when 3-point field goals were officially instituted by the NCAA. From the 1986–87 season through the 2007–08 season, the three-point perimeter was marked at 19 ft 9 in (6.02 m) for both men's and women's college basketball. On May 3, 2007, the NCAA men's basketball rules committee passed a measure to extend the distance of the men's three-point line back to 20 ft 9 in (6.32 m), while the women's line would remain the same until being moved to match the men's arc starting with the 2011–12 season. In June 2019, the NCAA officially announced that the men's three-point line would be extended to match the FIBA standard of 6.75 metres (22 ft 2 in) in a two-phase implementation, with Division I adopting the new distance in 2019–20 and Divisions II and III doing the same in 2020–21.

Through February 3, 2026, only 20 players have made at least 12 three-point field goals in a single game. Gary Bossert was the first and has the highest three-point field goal percentage among the 19. The all-time record is 15, which had only occurred one time between 1986–87 and 2017–18, by Marshall's Keith Veney. On December 14, 1996, he set the record against Morehead State. Then, within a two-night span in November 2018, two other players tied Veney's record. On November 14, Robert Morris' Josh Williams made 15, and then on November 15 Furman's Jordan Lyons matched it. Veney remains the only player to have made 15 threes against Division I opposition; Robert Morris' opponent of Mount Aloysius was in NCAA Division III, and Furman's opponent of North Greenville was Division II (both schools remain at those respective levels today). Only three other players have made 14 three-pointers: Ronald Blackshear, Dave Jamerson and Askia Jones. Blackshear and Jones did so against Division I opponents, while Jamerson's performance was against a Division II opponent. Jones' performance is an NCAA postseason record.

== Key ==
Pos.	G	F	C	Ref.
Position	Guard	Forward	Center	Reference(s)

Class (Cl.) key
Fr	Freshman	So	Sophomore	Jr	Junior	Sr	Senior

Team (X)	Denotes the number of times a player from that school appears on the list
^	Player still active in NCAA Division I

== Dates of 12+ three-pointers ==
3-pointers made	Player	Pos.	Cl.	Team	Opponent	Date	Ref.
15	Jordan Lyons	G	Jr	Furman	North Greenville	November 15, 2018	
15	Josh Williams	G	Jr	Robert Morris	Mount Aloysius	November 14, 2018	
15	Keith Veney	G	Sr	Marshall	Morehead State	December 14, 1996	
14	Ronald Blackshear	G	Jr	Marshall (2)	Akron	March 1, 2002	
14 ^{(NIT)}	Askia Jones	G	Sr	Kansas State	Fresno State	March 24, 1994	
14	Dave Jamerson	G	Sr	Ohio	Charleston (WV)	December 21, 1989	
13	Darius Dawkins	G	Sr	Jacksonville	Middle Georgia State	January 3, 2017	
13	A. J. English	G	Sr	Iona	Fairfield	December 1, 2015	
13	Rotnei Clarke	G	So	Arkansas	Alcorn State	November 13, 2009	
12	R. J. Hunter	G	So	Georgia State	UTSA	December 22, 2013	
12	Jamel Jackson	G	Jr	Seton Hall	VMI	December 12, 2009	
12	Michael Jenkins	G	Jr	Winthrop	North Greenville (2)	November 11, 2006	
12	Logan McIntire^	G	Sr	Central Michigan	UMass	February 3, 2026	
12	Terrence Woods	G	Jr	Florida A&M	Coppin State	March 1, 2003	
12	Clarence Gilbert	G	Sr	Missouri	Colorado	February 23, 2002	
12	David McMahan	G	Sr	Winthrop (2)	Coastal Carolina	January 15, 1996	
12	Mitch Taylor	G	Jr	Southern	Louisiana Christian	December 1, 1994	
12	Al Dillard	G	Jr	Arkansas (2)	Delaware State	December 11, 1993	
12	Darrin Fitzgerald	G	Sr	Butler	Detroit Mercy	February 9, 1987	
12	Gary Bossert	G	Sr	Niagara	Siena	January 7, 1987	
