= Kevin Rankin (basketball) =

Turkish-American basketball player (born 1971)

Personal information
- Born: August 26, 1971 (age 55) Wheeling, West Virginia
- Listed height: 6 ft 11 in (2.11 m)
- Listed weight: 265 lb (120 kg)

Career information
- High school: Pennings High School (De Pere, Wisconsin)
- College: Northwestern (1990–1994)
- NBA draft: 1994: undrafted
- Playing career: 1994–2003
- Position: Center / power forward
- Number: 12, 55, 8, 14

Career history
- 1994: Chicago Bulls
- 1994–1995: Fenerbahçe
- 1995–1996: CB Andorra
- 1996–2000: Ülkerspor
- 2000–2001: Hapoel Jerusalem
- 2001–2002: Pallacanestro Biella
- 2002–2003: Alba Berlin

Kevin Michael Rankin (born 26 August 1971) is a retired American/Turkish professional basketball player. He stands 2.10 m (6 ft 11 in) tall and played the power forward and center positions.

== Amateur career ==
After playing high school basketball in Wisconsin, Rankin played NCAA Division I college basketball at Northwestern University. He attended the university from 1990 to 1994, compiling a distinguished academic and athletic record.

Rankin started 111 of the 112 games he played at Northwestern and led the Wildcats in rebounding all four seasons, with a high of 8.4 per game during his junior season of 1992–1993. He remains the school's all-time leader in career blocked shots with 133. He led the team in scoring during his senior season, 1993–1994, with 15.3 points per game, and won the team MVP award in each of his last three seasons (1992, 1993, and 1994). He shared the 1992 award with teammates Todd Leslie and Cedric Neloms.

During his senior year, Rankin led the Wildcats to a thrilling 97–93 overtime berth in the 1994 National Invitation Tournament. The bid brought the Wildcats their first taste of postseason play since 1983.

Rankin was also an academic standout. He was named to the Academic All-America second team in 1994, and the third team in 1993. He won a spot on the Academic All-Big Ten team each year from 1992 to 1994, and was awarded the Big Ten Medal of Honor for scholastic and athletic excellence in 1994.
