= 1989 MAC men's basketball tournament =

- Classification: Division I
- Season: 1988–89
- Teams: 9
- Site: John F. Savage Hall; Toledo, Ohio
- Champions: Ball State (3rd title)
- Winning coach: Rick Majerus (1st title)
- MVP: Billy Butts (Ball State)
- MAC men's basketball tournaments

1988–89 Mid-American Conference men's basketball standings
	Conf.				Overall
Team	W		L	PCT	W		L	PCT
No. 18 Ball State †	14	–	2	.875	29	–	3	.906
Kent State	12	–	4	.750	21	–	10	.677
Toledo	11	–	5	.688	18	–	13	.581
Eastern Michigan	8	–	8	.500	17	–	12	.586
Central Michigan	7	–	9	.438	13	–	15	.464
Bowling Green	7	–	9	.438	13	–	15	.464
Western Michigan	6	–	10	.375	12	–	16	.429
Ohio	6	–	10	.375	13	–	16	.448
Miami (OH)	1	–	15	.063	5	–	23	.179
† 1989 MAC tournament winner Rankings from AP poll

The 1989 MAC men's basketball tournament took place on March 9–12, 1989 at John F. Savage Hall in Toledo, Ohio. Ball State defeated Kent State, 67–65 in the championship game, to win its second MAC Tournament title.

The Cardinals earned an automatic bid to the 1989 NCAA tournament as #9 seed in the Midwest region. In the round of 64, Ball State defeated Pittsburgh 68–64 to earn the first NCAA Tournament win in program history.

== Format ==
All Nine conference members participated, with the top 7 teams receiving a bye to the quarterfinal round.

== Bracket ==
First round March 9
8	Western Michigan	55
9	Ohio	61

Quarterfinals; March 9–10
1	#19 Ball State	62
8	Ohio	46
4	Miami (OH)	69
5	Eastern Michigan	70
3	Toledo	75
6	Central Michigan	55
2	Kent State	65
7	Bowling Green	56

Semifinals; March 10–11
1	#19 Ball State	77
5	Eastern Michigan	76
3	Toledo	43
2	Kent State	88

Final; March 12
1	#19 Ball State	67
3	Kent State	65
