= List of NCAA Division I men's basketball season 3-point field goal leaders =

A three-point field goal (also known as a "three-pointer" or "3-pointer") is a field goal in a basketball game, made from beyond the three-point line, a designated arc radiating from the basket. A successful attempt is worth three points, in contrast to the two points awarded for shots made inside the three-point line. The National Collegiate Athletic Association (NCAA) keeps records of the Division I 3-point field goal makes per game (3PG) average annual leaders. The statistic was first recognized in the 1986–87 season when 3-point field goals were officially instituted by the NCAA. From the 1986–87 season through the 2007–08 season, the three-point perimeter was marked at 19 ft 9 in (6.02 m) for both men's and women's college basketball. On May 3, 2007, the NCAA men's basketball rules committee passed a measure to extend the distance of the men's three-point line back to 20 ft 9 in (6.32 m), while the women's line would remain the same. The women's line would be moved back to match the men's line effective with the 2011–12 season. On June 5, 2019, the NCAA men's rules committee voted to extend the men's three-point line to the FIBA distance of 6.75 meters (22 ft 2 in), effective in 2019–20 in Division I and 2020–21 in lower NCAA divisions. The women's line remained at 20 ft 9 in until being moved to the FIBA distance in 2021–22.

Darrin Fitzgerald of Butler owns the all-time NCAA single-season record of 3-pointers made per game (5.64) which he accomplished in 1986–87. His 158 three-pointers made that season is also the second highest total in history behind Stephen Curry's 162 in 2007–08. Some players—such as prolific scorers Darrell Floyd, Pete Maravich and Austin Carr—who competed prior to the 1986–87 season may have scored more baskets from what would have been 3-point territory if the rule had been in place during their college careers. The player with the highest 3PG average over the span of his entire career (with a minimum of 200 made threes) is Mississippi Valley State's Timothy Pollard, who made 4.57 per game over four years.

== Key ==
| Pos. | G | F | C | 3PG |
| Position | Guard | Forward | Center | 3-pointers per game |

Class (Cl.) key
| Fr | Freshman | So | Sophomore | Jr | Junior | Sr | Senior | Gr | Graduate |

| ^ | Player still competing in NCAA Division I |
| Player (X) | Denotes the number of times the player had been the 3-point leader up to and including that season |

== 3-point field goals per game ==
Except as specifically noted, all teams are listed under their current athletic brand names, which do not always match those in use during a specific season.

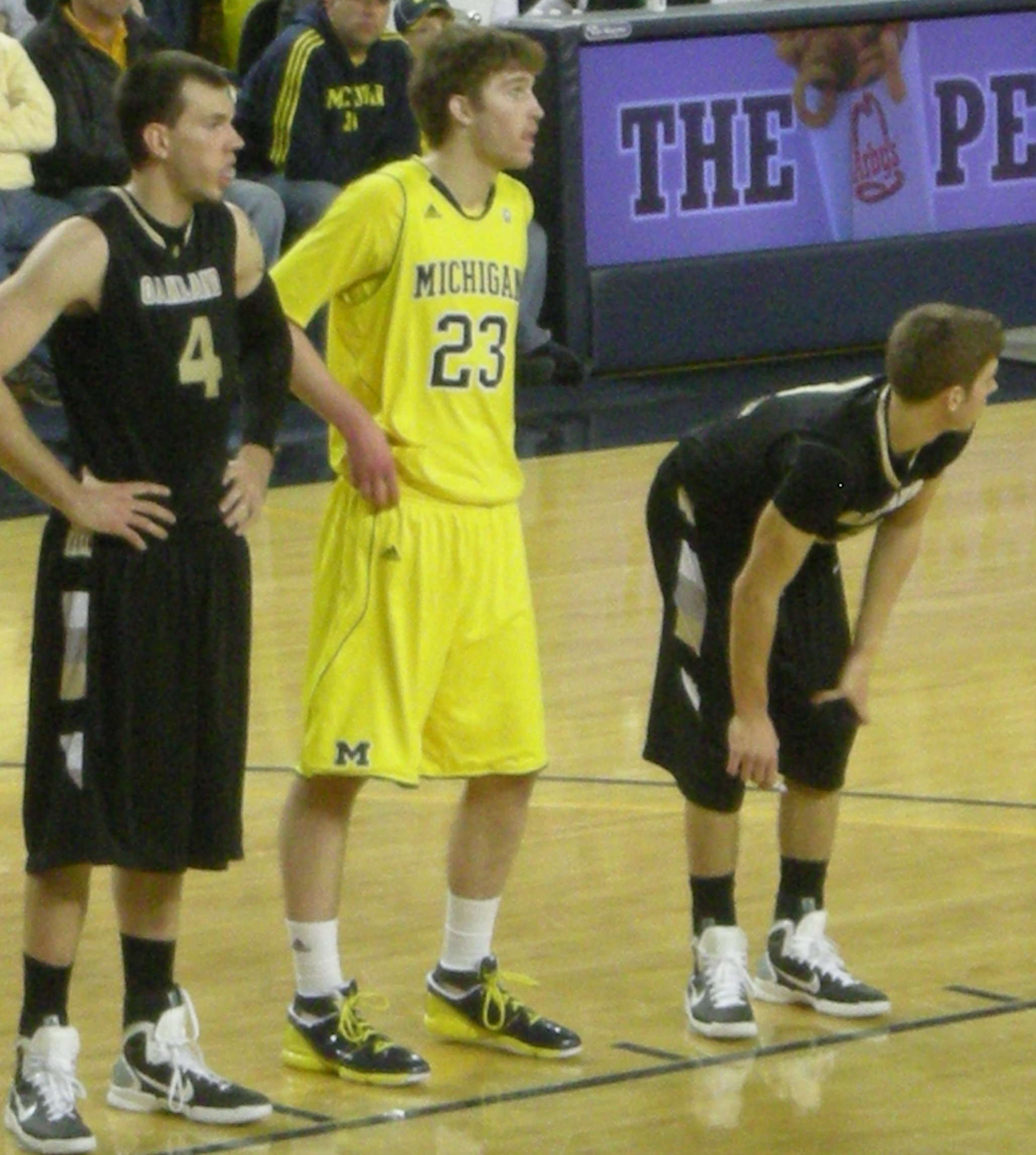
Travis Bader, right, was the 2012–13 leader.

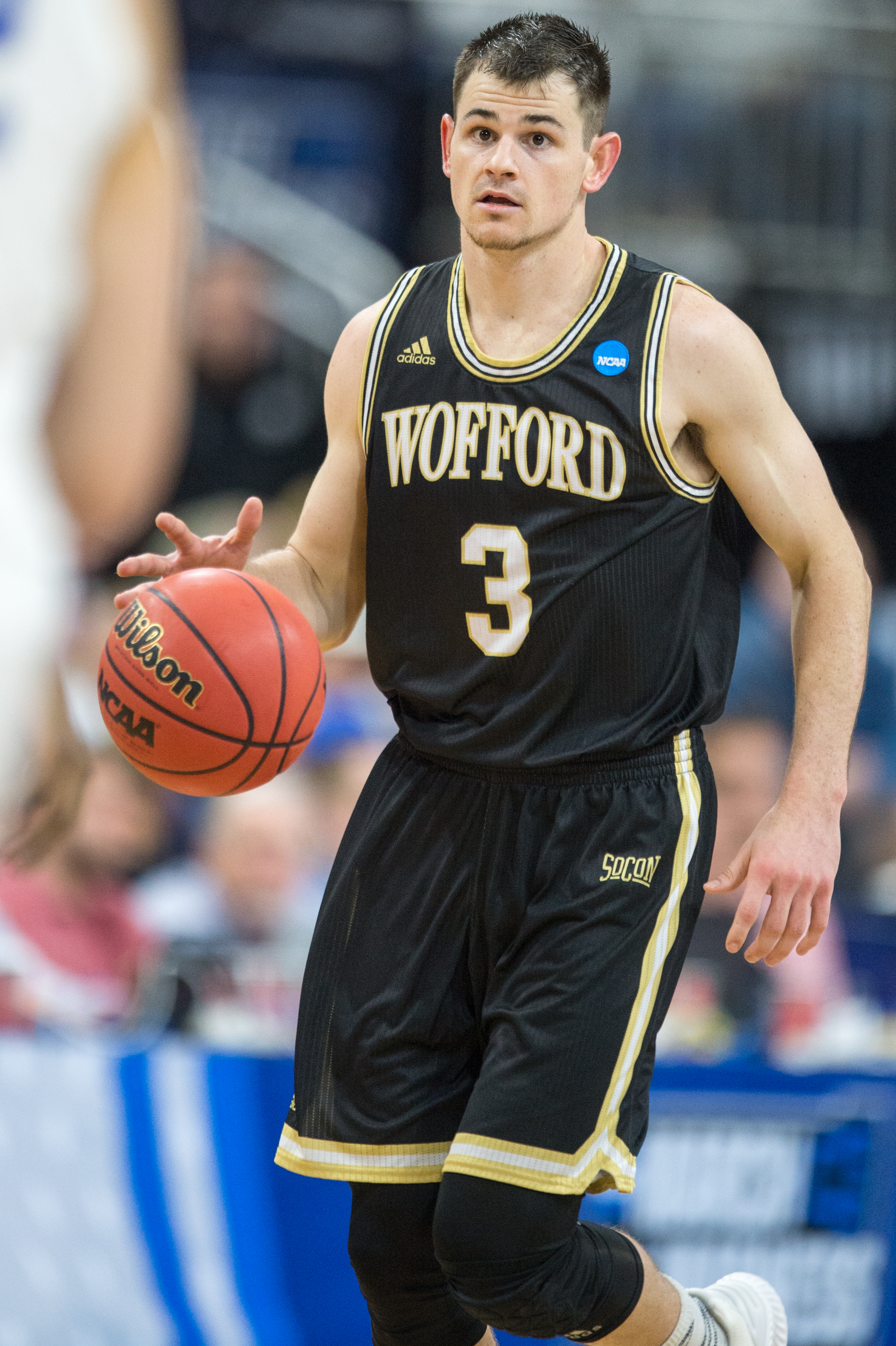
Fletcher Magee, the 2018–19 leader.

| Season | Player | Pos. | Cl. | Team | Games played | 3-point field goals | 3PG |
|---|---|---|---|---|---|---|---|
| 1986–87 | Darrin Fitzgerald | G | Sr | Butler | 28 | 158 | 5.64 |
| 1987–88 | Timothy Pollard | G | Jr | Mississippi Valley State | 28 | 132 | 4.71 |
| 1988–89 | Timothy Pollard (2) | G | Sr | Mississippi Valley State | 28 | 124 | 4.43 |
| 1989–90 | Dave Jamerson | G | Sr | Ohio | 28 | 131 | 4.68 |
| 1990–91 | Bobby Phills | G | Sr | Southern | 28 | 123 | 4.39 |
| 1991–92 | Doug Day | G | Jr | Radford | 29 | 117 | 4.03 |
| 1992–93 | Bernard Haslett | G | Jr | Southern Miss | 26 | 109 | 4.19 |
| 1993–94 | Chris Brown | G | Jr | UC Irvine | 26 | 122 | 4.69 |
| 1994–95 | Mitch Taylor | G | Jr | Southern | 25 | 109 | 4.36 |
| 1995–96 | Dominick Young | G | Jr | Fresno State | 29 | 120 | 4.14 |
| 1996–97 | William Fourche | G | Sr | Southern | 27 | 122 | 4.52 |
| 1997–98 | Curtis Staples | G | Sr | Virginia | 30 | 130 | 4.33 |
| 1998–99 | Brian Merriweather | G | Fr | Texas–Pan American (Note: Texas–Pan American ceased to exist after the 2014–15 school year, when the 2013 merger of the University of Texas–Pan American (UTPA) and the University of Texas at Brownsville, creating the current University of Texas Rio Grande Valley (UTRGV), took full effect. The UTPA athletic program, including its history, records, and memberships in Division I and the Western Athletic Conference, was fully inherited by UTRGV.) | 27 | 110 | 4.07 |
| 1999–00 | Brian Merriweather (2) | G | So | Texas–Pan American | 28 | 114 | 4.07 |
| 2000–01 | Dewayne Jefferson | G | Sr | Mississippi Valley State | 27 | 107 | 3.96 |
| 2001–02 | Cain Doliboa | G | Sr | Wright State | 28 | 104 | 3.71 |
| 2002–03 | Terrence Woods | G | Jr | Florida A&M | 28 | 139 | 4.96 |
| 2003–04 | Terrence Woods (2) | G | Sr | Florida A&M | 31 | 140 | 4.52 |
| 2004–05 | Brendan Plavich | G | Sr | Charlotte | 29 | 114 | 3.93 |
| 2005–06 | Andre Collins | G | Sr | Loyola (MD) | 28 | 118 | 4.21 |
| 2006–07 | Stephen Sir | G | Sr | Northern Arizona | 30 | 124 | 4.13 |
| 2007–08 | David Holston | G | Jr | Chicago State | 28 | 130 | 4.64 |
| 2008–09 | David Holston (2) | G | Sr | Chicago State | 32 | 147 | 4.59 |
| 2009–10 | Robbie Harman | G | Sr | Central Michigan | 30 | 105 | 3.50 |
| 2010–11 | Kevin Foster | G | So | Santa Clara | 38 | 140 | 3.68 |
| 2011–12 | John Jenkins | G | Jr | Vanderbilt | 35 | 134 | 3.83 |
| 2012–13 | Travis Bader | G | Jr | Oakland | 33 | 139 | 4.21 |
| 2013–14 | Akeem Richmond | G | Sr | East Carolina | 33 | 153 | 4.64 |
| 2014–15 | Tyler Harvey | G | Jr | Eastern Washington | 32 | 128 | 4.00 |
| 2015–16 | Buddy Hield | G | Sr | Oklahoma | 37 | 147 | 3.97 |
| 2016–17 | Marcus Keene | G | Jr | Central Michigan | 32 | 125 | 3.91 |
| 2017–18 | Kendrick Nunn | G | Sr | Oakland | 30 | 134 | 4.47 |
| 2018–19 | Fletcher Magee | G | Sr | Wofford | 35 | 158 | 4.51 |
| 2019–20 | Markus Howard | G | Sr | Marquette | 29 | 121 | 4.17 |
| 2020–21 | Jamir Harris | G | Sr | American | 10 (Note: Due to the COVID-19 pandemic's effect on teams' abilities to play full regular season schedules, the NCAA allowed for a lower games played requirement to be the season 3FGM leader.) | 39 | 3.90 |
| 2021–22 | Darius McGhee | G | Sr | Liberty | 33 | 142 | 4.30 |
| 2022–23 | Antoine Davis | G | Gr | Detroit Mercy | 33 | 159 | 4.82 |
| 2023–24 | Jack Gohlke | G | Gr | Oakland | 36 | 137 | 3.81 |
| 2024–25 | Abdi Bashir Jr.^ | G | So | Monmouth | 33 | 127 | 3.85 |
| 2025–26 | Jadin Booth | G | Gr | Samford | 30 | 127 | 4.23 |

== Multiple-time leaders ==
| Rank | Player | Team | Times leader | Years |
|---|---|---|---|---|
| 1 | David Holston | Chicago State | 2 | 2007–08, 2008–09 |
| 1 | Brian Merriweather | Texas–Pan American | 2 | 1998–99, 1999–00 |
| 1 | Timothy Pollard | Mississippi Valley State | 2 | 1987–88, 1988–89 |
| 1 | Terrence Woods | Florida A&M | 2 | 2002–03, 2003–04 |
