= 1988–89 Ohio Bobcats men's basketball team =

American college basketball season

1988–89 Ohio Bobcats men's basketball
- Conference: Mid-American Conference
- Record: 12–17 (6–10 MAC)
- Head coach: Billy Hahn (3rd season)
- Home arena: Convocation Center

1988–89 Mid-American Conference men's basketball standings
	Conf.				Overall
Team	W		L	PCT	W		L	PCT
No. 18 Ball State †	14	–	2	.875	29	–	3	.906
Kent State	12	–	4	.750	21	–	10	.677
Toledo	11	–	5	.688	18	–	13	.581
Eastern Michigan	8	–	8	.500	17	–	12	.586
Central Michigan	7	–	9	.438	13	–	15	.464
Bowling Green	7	–	9	.438	13	–	15	.464
Western Michigan	6	–	10	.375	12	–	16	.429
Ohio	6	–	10	.375	13	–	16	.448
Miami (OH)	1	–	15	.063	5	–	23	.179
† 1989 MAC tournament winner Rankings from AP poll

The 1988–89 Ohio Bobcats men's basketball team represented Ohio University in the college basketball season of 1988–89. The team was coached by Billy Hahn and played their home games at the Convocation Center.

== Schedule ==
Date time, TV	Rank^{#}	Opponent^{#}	Result	Record	Site (attendance) city, state
Non-conference regular season
11/26/1988*		Capital	W 81–67	1–0	Convocation Center; Athens, OH
11/29/1988*		at UNC Wilmington	L 68–75	1–1	Trask Coliseum; Wilmington, NC
12/3/1988*		at Boston University	L 74–80	1–2	Case Gym; Boston, MA
12/7/1988*		Morehead State	W 87–72	2–2	Convocation Center; Athens, OH
12/14/1988*		at Marshall	L 93–104	2–3	Cam Henderson Center; Huntington, WV
12/16/1988*		vs. Drexel; Walsworth Show-Me Classic	W 90–78	3–3	Hearnes Center (12,408); Columbia, MO
12/17/1988*		at No. 10 Missouri; Walsworth Show-Me Classic	L 85–113	3–4	Hearnes Center; Columbia, MO
12/19/1988*		at Youngstown St.	W 90–86	4–4	Convocation Center; Athens, OH
12/31/1988*		E. Kentucky	W 96–77	5–4	Convocation Center; Athens, OH
MAC regular season
1/4/1989		at Kent State	L 86–95	5–5	MAC Center; Kent, OH
1/7/1989*		Ball State	W 71–57	6–5	Convocation Center; Athens, OH
1/11/1989		at Miami (OH)	W 80–74	7–5	Millett Hall; Oxford, OH
1/14/1989		W. Michigan	L 90–91	7–6	Convocation Center; Athens, OH
1/18/1989		E. Michigan	W 86–80	8–6	Convocation Center; Athens, OH
1/21/1989		at C. Michigan	L 69–79	8–7	McGuirk Arena; Mount Pleasant, MI
1/25/1989		Bowling Green	L 50–56	8–8	Convocation Center; Athens, OH
1/28/1989		at Toledo	L 67–71	8–9	Savage Arena; Toledo, OH
1/31/1989		Akron	W 76–72	9–9	Convocation Center; Athens, OH
2/4/1989		at Ball State	L 70–80	9–10	Irving Gymnasium; Muncie, IN
2/8/1989		Miami (OH)	W Forfeit	10–10	Convocation Center; Athens, OH
2/11/1989		W. Michigan	L 81–85	10–11	University Arena; Kalamazoo, MI
2/15/1989		at E. Michigan	W 81–68	11–11	Bowen Field House; Ypsilanti, MI
2/18/1989		C. Michigan	L 60–62	11–12	Convocation Center; Athens, OH
2/22/1989		at Bowling Green	L 68–73 ^{OT}	11–13	Anderson Arena; Bowling Green, OH
2/25/1989		Toledo	W 77–74	12–13	Convocation Center; Athens, OH
2/27/1989*		Evansville	L 68–95	12–14	Roberts Municipal Stadium; Evansville, IN
3/4/1989		at Kent State	L 70–86	12–15	Convocation Center; Athens, OH
MAC tournament
3/10/1989		vs. W. Michigan	W 61–55	13–15	Centennial Hall; Toledo, OH
3/10/1989		vs. No. 19 Ball State	L 46–62	13–16	Centennial Hall; Toledo, OH
*Non-conference game. ^{#}Rankings from AP Poll. (#) Tournament seedings in parentheses. All times are in Eastern Time.

== Statistics ==
=== Team statistics ===
Final 1988–89 statistics

Record	Ohio	OPP
Scoring	2201	2250
Scoring Average	75.90	77.59
Field goals – Att	816–1721	781–1636
3-pt. Field goals – Att	127–338	147–369
Free throws – Att	442–600	541–744
Rebounds	1012	970
Assists	434	421
Turnovers	428	387
Steals	179	186
Blocked Shots	88	84

=== Player statistics ===
			Minutes		Scoring		Total FGs			3-point FGs			Free-Throws			Rebounds								
Player	GP	GS	Tot	Avg	Pts	Avg	FG	FGA	Pct	3FG	3FA	Pct	FT	FTA	Pct	Off	Def	Tot	Avg	A	PF	TO	Stl	Blk
Paul Graham	29	-	-	-	645	22.2	224	431	0.520	21	46	0.457	176	217	0.811	-	-	203	7.0	98	0	76	60	27
Dave Jamerson	29	-	-	-	551	19.0	200	413	0.484	59	145	0.407	92	107	0.860	-	-	136	4.7	82	77	67	35	3
John Beauford	27	-	-	-	317	11.7	127	282	0.450	8	30	0.267	55	79	0.696	-	-	169	6.3	5	0	52	5	33
Dennis Whitaker	27	-	-	-	186	6.9	66	157	0.420	15	43	0.349	39	55	0.709	-	-	86	3.2	148	0	0	43	13
Nate Craig	29	-	-	-	169	5.8	58	137	0.423	13	49	0.265	40	57	0.702	-	-	76	2.6	37	0	0	17	2
Lorenzo Bryant	26	-	-	-	156	6.0	69	136	0.507	0	1	0.000	18	29	0.621	-	-	95	3.7	16	0	0	1	4
Reggie Rankin	13	-	-	-	58	4.5	25	58	0.431	4	11	0.364	4	8	0.500	-	-	25	1.9	15	0	0	2	0
Rick Hoffman	23	-	-	-	39	1.7	16	34	0.471	0	0	0.000	7	11	0.636	-	-	30	1.3	5	0	0	7	2
Tom Jamerson	22	-	-	-	35	1.6	13	24	0.542	6	12	0.500	3	7	0.429	-	-	32	1.5	19	0	0	5	0
George Reid	24	-	-	-	34	1.4	15	39	0.385	0	0	0.000	4	22	0.182	-	-	45	1.9	5	0	0	3	4
Enrico Rau	13	-	-	-	8	0.6	2	9	0.222	0	0	0.000	4	8	0.500	-	-	11	0.8	3	0	0	1	0
Jerry Hammond	2	-	-	-	3	1.5	1	1	1.000	1	1	1.000	0	0	0.000	-	-	1	0.5	1	0	0	0	0
Total	29	-	-	-	2201	75.9	816	1721	0.474	127	338	0.376	442	600	0.737			1012	34.9	434	639	428	179	88
Opponents	29	-	-	-	2250	77.6	781	1636	0.477	147	369	0.398	541	744	0.727			970	33.4	421	553	387	186	84

Legend
GP	Games played	GS	Games started	Avg	Average per game
FG	Field-goals made	FGA	Field-goal attempts	Off	Offensive rebounds
Def	Defensive rebounds	A	Assists	TO	Turnovers
Blk	Blocks	Stl	Steals	High	Team high

== Awards and honors ==
- Paul Graham – MAC Player of the Year
