= 1990 MAC men's basketball tournament =

- Classification: Division I
- Season: 1989–90
- Teams: 8
- Site: Cobo Arena; Detroit, Michigan
- Champions: Ball State (4th title)
- Winning coach: Dick Hunsaker (1st title)
- MVP: Billy Butts (Ball State)
- MAC men's basketball tournaments

1989–90 Mid-American Conference men's basketball standings
	Conf.				Overall
Team	W		L	PCT	W		L	PCT
Ball State†	13	–	3	.813	26	–	7	.788
Kent State	12	–	4	.750	21	–	8	.724
Miami	9	–	7	.563	14	–	15	.483
Bowling Green	9	–	7	.563	18	–	11	.621
Eastern Michigan	8	–	8	.500	19	–	13	.594
Toledo	7	–	9	.438	12	–	16	.429
Central Michigan	6	–	10	.375	13	–	17	.433
Ohio	5	–	11	.313	12	–	16	.429
Western Michigan	3	–	13	.188	9	–	18	.333
† 1990 MAC tournament winner Rankings from AP Poll

The 1990 MAC men's basketball tournament took place March 9–11, 1990, at Cobo Arena in Detroit, Michigan. Ball State defeated Central Michigan, 78–56 in the championship game, to win its second straight (4th overall) MAC Tournament title.

The Cardinals earned the conference's automatic bid to the 1990 NCAA tournament as No. 12 seed in the West region. In the round of 64, Ball State defeated Oregon State, led by Gary Payton, 54–53. The Cardinals then knocked off Louisville, 62–60, to make the first Sweet Sixteen appearance in program history. Though their cinderella run would end, Ball State was up to the challenge, falling to No. 1 seed and eventual national champion UNLV by just two points, 69–67.

== Format ==
Eight of nine conference members participated, with Western Michigan left out of the competition due to their last place finish in the regular season standings.

== Bracket ==
Quarterfinals; March 9
1	Ball State	77
8	Ohio	70
4	Bowling Green	60
5	Eastern Michigan	62
3	Miami (OH)	108
6	Toledo	80
7	Central Michigan	82
2	Kent State	68

Semifinals; March 10
1	Ball State	69
5	Eastern Michigan	58
3	Miami (OH)	76
7	Central Michigan	78

Final; March 11
1	Ball State	78
7	Central Michigan	56
