= Terrence Woods =

American basketball player

Personal information
- Born: September 10, 1981 (age 45) Memphis, Tennessee
- Listed height: 6 ft 3 in (1.91 m)
- Listed weight: 185 lb (84 kg)

Career information
- High school: Treadwell (Memphis, Tennessee)
- College: Tennessee (1999–2001); Florida A&M (2002–2004)
- NBA draft: 2004: undrafted
- Position: Shooting guard

Career highlights
- Tennessee Mr. Basketball (1999)

Terrence Woods (born September 10, 1981) is an American basketball player. He has played internationally in Mexico and Jordan as well as for leagues in the United States, such as the USBL and WBA.

== Playing career ==
=== High school and Tennessee ===
In 1998–99, Woods was named the Tennessee Mr. Basketball for Class AA while playing for Treadwell High School in Memphis, Tennessee. He accepted a scholarship to the University of Tennessee to play. He was a key bench player in his freshman and sophomore seasons, but after his sophomore season ended both he and teammate Harris Walker were kicked off the Volunteers basketball team for undisclosed reasons. Woods transferred to Florida A&M to finish his collegiate career but was forced to sit the 2001–02 season due to NCAA transfer eligibility rules.

=== Florida A&M ===
Woods' career at Florida A&M was a historic one. In both of his seasons suiting up for the Rattlers he led NCAA Division I in three-point field goals made per game, while his 4.96 per game set an NCAA junior class record. He had a personal career high of 12 three-pointers made in a single game, which he achieved on March 1, 2003, against Coppin State. That season Woods made 139 threes and followed that up with making 140 in his senior season. He also led the Rattlers to their school's first-ever men's basketball postseason tournament victory in 2004 when Florida A&M defeated Lehigh in play-in game of the NCAA Tournament. After his senior season ended, Woods won the NCAA 3-Point Shootout contest by defeating Oregon's Luke Jackson 23 to 20 in the final round.

== Professional ==
Woods never played in the NBA. Instead, he was a journeyman in different semi-pro leagues in the United States as well as playing internationally, such as in Jordan and Mexico for the Vaqueros de Agua Prieta.

== See also ==
- List of NCAA Division I men's basketball season 3-point field goal leaders
- List of NCAA Division I men's basketball players with 12 or more 3-point field goals in a game
