= Al Dillard =

American basketball player

Alex Dillard is a former professional basketball player and a member of the University of Arkansas Razorbacks 1994 NCAA champion men's basketball team.

Dillard was known as an excellent three-point shooter, and he set a Southeastern Conference record for most three-pointers in a game (12 against Delaware State in 1993), which lasted for 16 years. He was known to fans as Al "3-D" Dillard, and even wore jersey #3. In addition, he was sometimes known by the nickname "Deadeye", also a recognition of his three-point shooting prowess.

== See also ==
- List of NCAA Division I men's basketball players with 12 or more 3-point field goals in a game
