= Keith Veney =

American basketball player (born 1974)

Personal information
- Born: December 20, 1974 (age 51) Lanham, Maryland, U.S.
- Listed height: 6 ft 2 in (1.88 m)
- Listed weight: 200 lb (91 kg)

Career information
- High school: Bishop McNamara (Forestville, Maryland)
- College: Lamar (1992–1994); Marshall (1995–1997)
- NBA draft: 1997: undrafted
- Playing career: 1997–2000
- Position: Shooting guard

Career history

Playing
- 1997–1998: Pau Orthez
- 1998–1999: Hapoel Tel Aviv
- 1999: Komfort Stargard Szczec
- 2000: Njarðvík

Coaching
- 2023–2026: Dallas Mavericks (assistant)

Career highlights
- Icelandic All-Star Game MVP (2000); Icelandic All-Star (2000); NCAA Division I record, 3FGM (T–15)

Keith Marcel Veney (born December 12, 1974) is an American former basketball player who was notable for his standout career for Marshall University and last was an assistant coach for the Dallas Mavericks of the National Basketball Association (NBA). He is tied with two other players for the National Collegiate Athletic Association (NCAA) Division I record for the most three-point field goals made in a single game, with 15, and is the only one of the three to have done so against a Division I opponent.

== High school career ==
Veney, a native of Seabrook, Maryland, played high school basketball at Bishop McNamara High School in Forestville where he led the area in scoring at over 30 points per game as a senior.

== College career ==
He then went on to play his first two years of college basketball at Lamar University before transferring to Marshall for the remaining two years. On March 20, 2018, Bishop McNamara announced that Veney would return to the school as the new boys’ varsity basketball head coach.

During his cumulative four-year NCAA career, Veney scored 409 three-pointers, which is currently in the top 25 all-time in Division I history. At the time of his graduation, he was number one. Veney scored 51 points while making a still-standing NCAA record 15 three-pointers against Morehead State on December 14, 1996.

== Professional career ==
After college, Veney went on to play five years of professional basketball in France, Israel, Iceland, Poland and the Dominican Republic.

In January 2000, Veney signed with Úrvalsdeild karla powerhouse Njarðvík. On January 15, he participated in the Icelandic All-Star game where he was named the game's MVP after making 12 threes on his way to 43 points. In middle of February, Veney was released by Njarðvík after averaging 10.6 points and 4.1 assists in 7 games.

After his playing career ended, he returned to the United States as a Nike NBA player representative before eventually starting his own company, Veney Management Group. Today, he also runs basketball clinics and camps for younger players all over the country.

== See also ==
- List of NCAA Division I men's basketball players with 12 or more 3-point field goals in a game
