= Ronald Blackshear =

American basketball player (born 1978)

Personal information
- Born: May 24, 1978 (age 48) Camilla, Georgia
- Listed height: 6 ft 5 in (1.96 m)
- Listed weight: 210 lb (95 kg)

Career information
- High school: Mitchell County (Camilla, Georgia); Hargrave Military Academy (Chatham, Virginia)
- College: Temple (2000–2001); Marshall (2001–2003)
- NBA draft: 2003: undrafted
- Playing career: 2004–2009
- Position: Shooting guard

Career history
- 2004–2005: Huntsville Flight
- 2005: Tulsa 66ers

Career highlights
- Second-team All-MAC (2003)

Ronald Blackshear Jr. (born May 24, 1978) is an American former professional basketball player. He played in leagues in the United States, Cyprus, Argentina, Mexico, the Dominican Republic, Venezuela, and Romania. Blackshear is best known for his collegiate career in the United States, however, where he was a standout player for Marshall University in 2001–02 and 2002–03. He then declared for the 2003 NBA draft as an early entry candidate upon the conclusion of his junior season, but after going undrafted he began his international career.

== College career ==
Ronald committed to play basketball for Clemson University, but since he did not meet NCAA eligibility requirements, he spent one additional prep year at Hargrave Military Academy in Chatham, Virginia. After eight games playing for the academy, Blackshear was kicked off due to repeatedly violating team rules. He returned home, but after more complications with Clemson, Blackshear instead enrolled at Temple University to play for John Chaney. Chaney and Blackshear did not get along, and after playing in just 10 games, he left the school. Two months later he found himself enrolled at Marshall University.

Blackshear matured at Marshall and played successfully for the Thundering Herd during his sophomore and junior seasons. In just two years at the school he scored exactly 1,000 points, with season averages of 19.6 and 20.3 points per game, respectively. Known as an accurate and prolific shooter, Blackshear made 189 three-point field goals, good for fourth most in Marshall history at the time of his graduation. He once tied an NCAA record by making 11 consecutive three-point attempts in a game and finished with the second-most made of all-time (14). Both feats occurred in a game against Akron on March 1, 2002.

== Professional career ==
For a time during Blackshear's junior year in college he was projected to be a first round draft pick in the 2003 NBA draft, but this ultimately turned out to be a false project since he did not get chosen at all that year. His professional career began in the summer of 2004 in Venezuela. He then played in Argentina for Estudiantes Olavarria, then finished the rest of the 2004–05 season with the Huntsville Flight in the NBA Development League. Blackshear split the 2005–06 season between EKA AEL Limassol in Cyprus and the D-League's Tulsa 66ers. After summer 2006 in which he played for Marineros de Puerto Plata in the Dominican Republic, Blackshear headed to Romania for the 2006–07 with CSU Atlassib Sibiu. His final two seasons of professional basketball included another stint in the Dominican Republic, Venezuela, and Mexico before last playing in 2009.

== See also ==
- List of NCAA Division I men's basketball players with 12 or more 3-point field goals in a game
