= Askia Jones =

American-Venezuelan basketball player

Personal information
- Born: December 3, 1971 (age 54) Philadelphia, Pennsylvania, U.S.
- Listed height: 6 ft 5 in (1.96 m)
- Listed weight: 200 lb (91 kg)

Career information
- High school: John Marshall (San Antonio, Texas)
- College: Kansas State (1990–1994)
- NBA draft: 1994: undrafted
- Playing career: 1994–2010
- Position: Shooting guard
- Number: 2

Career history
- 1994: Minnesota Timberwolves
- 1994–1995: Rockford Lightning
- 1995: Illiabum Clube
- 1995: Aspac Jakarta
- 1995–1997: Rio Claro Basquete
- 1996–2001: Guaiqueríes de Margarita
- 1997: Polluelos de Aibonito
- 1997–1998: Apollon Limassol
- 1998–1999: Flamengo
- 1999–2000: Joventut Badalona
- 2001: Los Barrios
- 2001–2002: Shell Turbo Chargers
- 2002–2004: Trotamundos de Carabobo
- 2005–2009: Gaiteros del Zulia
- 2010: Guaros de Lara

Career NBA statistics
- Points: 45 (4.1 ppg)
- Rebounds: 11 (1.0 rpg)
- Assists: 16 (1.5 apg)
- Stats at NBA.com
- Stats at Basketball Reference

Askia Rahman Jones (born December 3, 1971) is an American-Venezuelan former professional basketball player, a 6-foot-5-inch (1.96 m) shooting guard. He played college basketball for the Kansas State Wildcats.

A Kansas State University graduate born in Philadelphia, Pennsylvania, Jones left college as the third-leading scorer in its history. He finished his four-year college career averaging 14.8 points a game.

His scoring prowess was demonstrated on March 24, 1994, when he scored sixty-two points in only twenty-eight minutes against Fresno State in the 1994 NIT quarterfinals, the second-highest postseason scoring total in college basketball history. The fourteen three-point field goals scored by Jones in that game are a postseason record. He was also the first to make 14 against an NCAA Division I opponent.

He is also the last Division I men's player to date to have a sixty-point regulation game; the only other players since then to score sixty points, Eddie House in 2000 and Ben Woodside in 2008, respectively required two and three overtimes.

The son of former National Basketball Association player Wali Jones, Jones, after brief spell with the Minnesota Timberwolves in 1994–95, took his game to Venezuela, Brazil, Indonesia, the Philippines, Portugal, Cyprus and Spain, in a professional career spanning almost two decades.

He eventually received Venezuelan citizenship and played with Venezuela national basketball team in the 2005 FIBA Americas Championship, winning the bronze medal.

== See also ==
- List of NCAA Division I men's basketball players with 12 or more 3-point field goals in a game
- List of NCAA Division I men's basketball players with 60 or more points in a game
