= 1989–90 Ohio Bobcats men's basketball team =

American college basketball season

1989–90 Ohio Bobcats men's basketball
- Conference: Mid-American Conference
- Record: 12–16 (5–11 MAC)
- Head coach: Larry Hunter (1st season)
- Home arena: Convocation Center

1989–90 Mid-American Conference men's basketball standings
	Conf.				Overall
Team	W		L	PCT	W		L	PCT
Ball State†	13	–	3	.813	26	–	7	.788
Kent State	12	–	4	.750	21	–	8	.724
Miami	9	–	7	.563	14	–	15	.483
Bowling Green	9	–	7	.563	18	–	11	.621
Eastern Michigan	8	–	8	.500	19	–	13	.594
Toledo	7	–	9	.438	12	–	16	.429
Central Michigan	6	–	10	.375	13	–	17	.433
Ohio	5	–	11	.313	12	–	16	.429
Western Michigan	3	–	13	.188	9	–	18	.333
† 1990 MAC tournament winner Rankings from AP Poll

The 1989–90 Ohio Bobcats men's basketball team represented Ohio University in the college basketball season of 1989–90. The team was coached by Larry Hunter in his first season and played their home games at the Convocation Center.

== Schedule ==
Date time, TV	Rank^{#}	Opponent^{#}	Result	Record	Site (attendance) city, state
Non-conference regular season
11/25/1989*		Rider	W 79–60	1–0	Convocation Center; Athens, OH
11/28/1989*		Kentucky	L 73–76	1–1	Rupp Arena; Lexington, KY
12/1/1989*		at Iowa; Amanda Hawkeye Classic	L 49–75	1–2	Carver–Hawkeye Arena; Iowa City, IA
12/2/1989*		vs. Bradley; Amanda Hawkeye Classic	W 72–53	2–2	Carver–Hawkeye Arena; Iowa City, IA
12/9/1989*		Marshall	W 72–63	3–2	Convocation Center; Athens, OH
12/11/1989*		at Akron	L 60–66	3–3	James A. Rhodes Arena; Akron, OH
12/14/1989*		E. Kentucky	W 53–52	4–3	Alumni Coliseum; Richmond, KY
12/18/1989*		at Youngstown St.	W 96–95	5–3	Beeghly Center; Youngstown, OH
12/21/1989*		Charleston	W 110–81	6–3	Convocation Center; Athens, OH
12/29/1989*		vs. Washington St. Volunteer Classic	L 69–72	6–4	Thompson–Boling Arena; Knoxville, TN
12/30/1989*		vs. Fordham; Volunteer Classic	W 79–73	7–4	Thompson–Boling Arena; Knoxville, TN
MAC regular season
1/3/1990		Miami (OH)	L 72–87	7–5	Convocation Center; Athens, OH
1/6/1990		W. Michigan	L 72–81	7–6	Read Fieldhouse; Kalamazoo, MI
1/10/1990		at Toledo	L 66–86	7–7	Savage Arena; Toledo, OH
1/13/1990		C. Michigan	L 88–100	7–8	Convocation Center; Athens, OH
1/17/1990		at Bowling Green	W 65–61	8–8	Anderson Arena; Bowling Green, OH
1/20/1990		E. Michigan	W 70–52	9–8	Convocation Center; Athens, OH
1/27/1990		Kent State	L 63–74	9–9	Convocation Center; Athens, OH
1/31/1990		at Ball State	L 61–71	9–10	Irving Gymnasium; Muncie, IN
2/3/1990		W. Michigan	W 67–66	10–10	Convocation Center; Athens, OH
2/7/1990		Toledo	W 76–71	11–10	Convocation Center; Athens, OH
2/10/1990		at C. Michigan	W 60–57	12–10	McGuirk Arena; Mount Pleasant, MI
2/14/1990		Bowling Green	L 60–75	12–11	Convocation Center; Athens, OH
2/17/1990		at E. Michigan	L 63–79	12–12	Bowen Field House; Ypsilanti, MI
2/24/1990		at Kent State	L 78–83	12–13	MAC Center; Kent, OH
2/28/1990		Ball State	L 60–77	12–14	Convocation Center; Athens, OH
3/3/1990		at Miami (OH)	L 76–93	12–15	Millett Hall; Oxford, OH
MAC tournament
3/9/1990		vs. Ball State	L 70–77	12–16	Cobo Center; Detroit, MI
*Non-conference game. ^{#}Rankings from AP Poll. (#) Tournament seedings in parentheses. All times are in Eastern Time.

== Statistics ==
=== Team statistics ===
Final 1989–90 statistics

Record	Ohio	OPP
Scoring	1979	2062
Scoring Average	70.68	73.64
Field goals – Att	712–1689	710–1507
3-pt. Field goals – Att	171–447	149–346
Free throws – Att	384–577	493–692
Rebounds	996	1030
Assists	379	384
Turnovers	308	357
Steals	141	131
Blocked Shots	38	92

=== Player statistics ===
			Minutes		Scoring		Total FGs			3-point FGs			Free-Throws			Rebounds								
Player	GP	GS	Tot	Avg	Pts	Avg	FG	FGA	Pct	3FG	3FA	Pct	FT	FTA	Pct	Off	Def	Tot	Avg	A	PF	TO	Stl	Blk
Dave Jamerson	28	-	-	-	874	31.2	297	647	0.459	131	303	0.432	149	177	0.842	-	-	179	6.4	49	72	64	24	8
Dennis Whitaker	28	-	-	-	279	10.0	96	267	0.360	16	56	0.286	71	115	0.617	-	-	150	5.4	185	0	0	59	5
Nate Craig	28	-	-	-	214	7.6	85	228	0.373	11	39	0.282	33	65	0.508	-	-	135	4.8	62	0	0	30	5
Chad Gill	27	-	-	-	149	5.5	49	141	0.348	2	6	0.333	49	86	0.570	-	-	117	4.3	14	0	0	6	4
Steve Barnes	11	-	-	-	96	8.7	40	77	0.519	0	1	0.000	16	25	0.640	-	-	60	5.5	10	0	0	5	9
Jeff Hoeppner	27	-	-	-	86	3.2	28	64	0.438	4	16	0.250	26	41	0.634	-	-	44	1.6	10	0	0	1	0
Jerry Lebold	26	-	-	-	79	3.0	30	55	0.545	0	0	0.000	19	32	0.594	-	-	76	2.9	19	0	0	6	4
Rick Hoffman	27	-	-	-	70	2.6	30	63	0.476	0	0	0.000	10	18	0.556	-	-	69	2.6	15	0	0	4	2
Reggie Rankin	25	-	-	-	70	2.8	32	97	0.330	6	22	0.273	0	0	0.000	-	-	33	1.3	6	0	0	3	0
Lorenzo Bryant	4	-	-	-	34	8.5	15	26	0.577	0	0	0.000	4	7	0.571	-	-	14	3.5	3	0	0	0	1
Tom Jamerson	10	-	-	-	28	2.8	10	19	0.526	1	4	0.250	7	11	0.636	-	-	12	1.2	6	0	0	3	0
Alonzo Motley	0	-	-	-	0	0.0	0	0	0.000	0	0	0.000	0	0	0.000	-	-	0	0.0	0	0	0	0	0
Martin Scanlon	8	-	-	-	0	0.0	0	5	0.000	0	0	0.000	0	0	0.000	-	-	1	0.1	0	0	0	0	0
Total	28	-	-	-	1979	70.7	712	1689	0.422	171	447	0.383	384	577	0.666			996	35.6	379	593	308	141	38
Opponents	28	-	-	-	2062	73.6	710	1507	0.471	149	346	0.430	493	692	0.712			1030	36.8	384	556	357	131	92

Legend
GP	Games played	GS	Games started	Avg	Average per game
FG	Field-goals made	FGA	Field-goal attempts	Off	Offensive rebounds
Def	Defensive rebounds	A	Assists	TO	Turnovers
Blk	Blocks	Stl	Steals	High	Team high
