= Leonard Drake =

Biographical details
- Born: July 16, 1954; Chicago, Illinois, U.S.
- Died: September 29, 2010 (aged 56); Evansville, Indiana, U.S.

Playing career
- 1975–1978: Central Michigan

Coaching career (HC unless noted)
- 1978–1979: Central Michigan (assistant)
- 1979–1984: Xavier (LA) (assistant)
- 1984–1985: Xavier (LA)
- 1985–1993: Ball State (assoc. HC)
- 1993–1997: Central Michigan
- 1997–2002: Lamar (assoc. HC)
- 2002–2007: Lamar (women's)
- 2007–2010: Eastern Michigan (women's asst.)

Head coaching record
- Overall: 74–196 (.274)

Leonard Drake (born July 16, 1954 – September 29, 2010) He was a native of Chicago, Illinois. His collegiate coaching career spanned 33 years serving as head coach and assistant coach in both men's and women's basketball. He ended his career as athletics director at Evansville Central High School in Evansville, IN. Drake was a four-year letterman for the Central Michigan basketball team. He received several honors for his play with the Chippewas.

== Coaching ==
Over Leonard Drake's 33-year career, he was part of eight conference championships, seven conference tournament championships, five NCAA tournaments, four NITs, and one WNIT. He coached NAIA team, Xavier of Louisiana, as well as three teams from the Mid-American Conference (MAC) and one from the Southland Conference.

=== Head coaching record ===
Statistics overview
Season	Team	Overall	Conference	Standing	Postseason
Xavier University of Louisiana (GCAC (NAIA)) (1984–1985)
1984–85	Xavier (LA)	13–16			
Central Michigan Chippewas (MAC) (1993–1997)
1993–94	Central Michigan	5–21	4–14	9th	
1994–95	Central Michigan	3–23	0–18	10th	
1995–96	Central Michigan	6–20	3–15	9th	
1996–97	Central Michigan	7–19	4–14	10th	
Central Michigan:		21–83 (.202)	11–61 (.153)		
Lamar Lady Cardinals (Southland Conference) (2002–2007)
2002–03	Lamar	3–24	2–18	11th	
2003–04	Lamar	4–22	1–15	10th	
2004–05	Lamar	9–18	3–11	11th	
2005–06	Lamar	11–16	6–8	8th	
2006–07	Lamar	13–19	8–9	7th T	
Lamar:		40–97 (.292)	20–69 (.225)		
Total:		74–196 (.274)			
National champion Postseason invitational champion Conference regular season champion Conference regular season and conference tournament champion Division regular season champion Division regular season and conference tournament champion Conference tournament champion
