= Basketball Bundesliga Top Scorer =

German basketball award

The Basketball Bundesliga Top Scorer award is given to the highest scorer of each season of the Basketball Bundesliga (BBL). In basketball, points are the sum of the score accumulated through free throws or field goals. The Basketball Bundesliga's scoring title is awarded to the player with the highest points per game average in a given season.

Prior to the 1990–91 season, the league's Top Scorer was the player that scored the most total points in the league during the season. Since the 1990–91 season, the league's Top Scorer is the player with the highest scoring average per game during the season.

== Leaders by total points scored ==
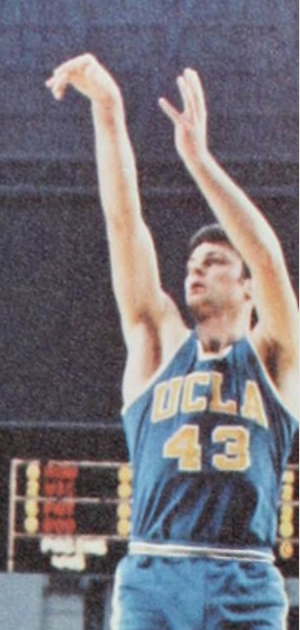
Terry Schofield was the German League's Top Scorer, in 1974.

Note: Flags indicate national team eligibility at FIBA-sanctioned events. Players may hold other non-FIBA nationalities not displayed.

| Season | Player | Nationality | Club | Total Points Scored | Ref. |
By Total Points Scored (1966–67 to 1989–90)
| 1966–67 | Dieter Sarodnick | West Germany | Post-SV Hannover | 447 | |
| 1967–68 | Dieter Sarodnick (2×) | West Germany | Post-SV Hannover | 465 | |
| 1968–69 | Volkmar Knopke | West Germany | MTV Wolfenbüttel | 423 | |
| 1969–70 | Volkmar Knopke (2×) | West Germany | MTV Wolfenbüttel | 479 | |
| 1970–71 | Bohumil Tomášek | Czechoslovakia | SSV Hagen | 507 | |
| 1971–72 | Jim Wade | United States | Bamberg | 485 | |
| 1972–73 | John Ecker | West Germany | TuS 04 Leverkusen | 504 | |
| 1973–74 | Terry Schofield | United States | ASC 1846 Göttingen | 335 | |
| 1974–75 | Dennis Curran | United States | MTV 1846 Gießen | 574 | |
| 1975–76 | "Pinky" Smith | United States | SSV Hagen | 485 | |
| 1976–77 | Ljubodrag Simonović | Yugoslavia | Bamberg | 544 | |
| 1977–78 | Rainer Frontzek | West Germany | USC Heidelberg | 818 | |
| 1978–79 | Hans DeWitt | United States | MTV Wolfenbüttel | 725 | |
| 1979–80 | John Britton | United States | Eintracht Frankfurt | 721 | |
| 1980–81 | Lou Hardy | United States | BG DEK/Fichte Hagen | 633 | |
| 1981–82 | Michael Pappert | West Germany | BSC Saturn Köln | 661 | |
| 1982–83 | Georg Kämpf | West Germany | USC Bayreuth | 614 | |
| 1983–84 | Eugene Richardson | United States | SSV Hagen | 685 | |
| 1984–85 | Mike Jackel | West Germany | ASC 1846 Göttingen | 625 | |
| 1985–86 | Brent Timm | United States | SSV Hagen | 803 | |
| 1986–87 | Mike Jackel (2×) | West Germany | BSC Saturn Köln | 524 | |
| 1987–88 | André Hills | United States | BSG Basket Ludwigsburg | 554 | |
| 1988–89 | Keith Gray | United States | TSV Hagen 1860 | 541 | |
| 1989–90 | Rimas Kurtinaitis | Soviet Union | SSV Hagen | 638 | |

== Leaders by points per game ==
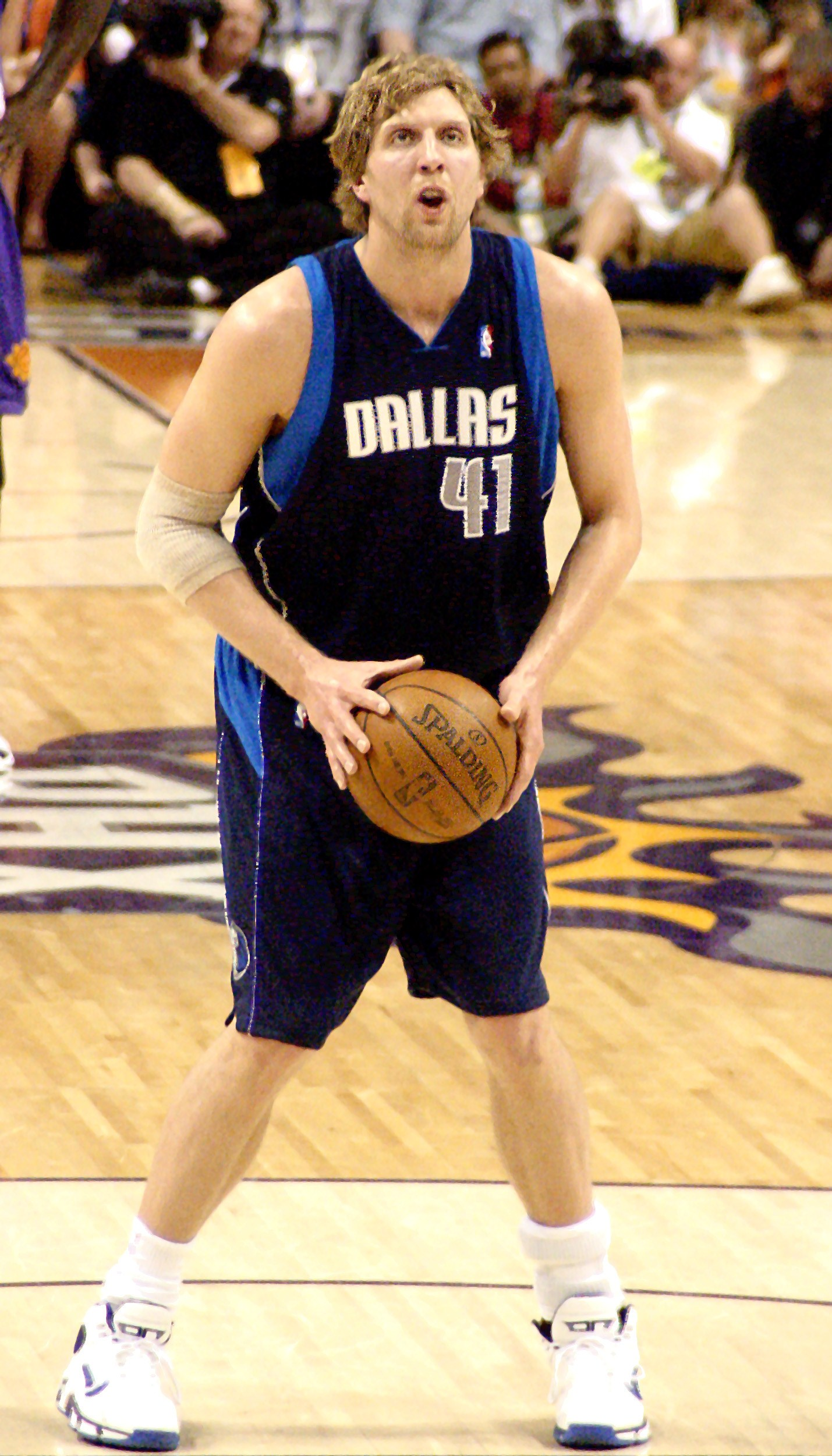
Dirk Nowitzki was the German League's Top Scorer, in 1999.

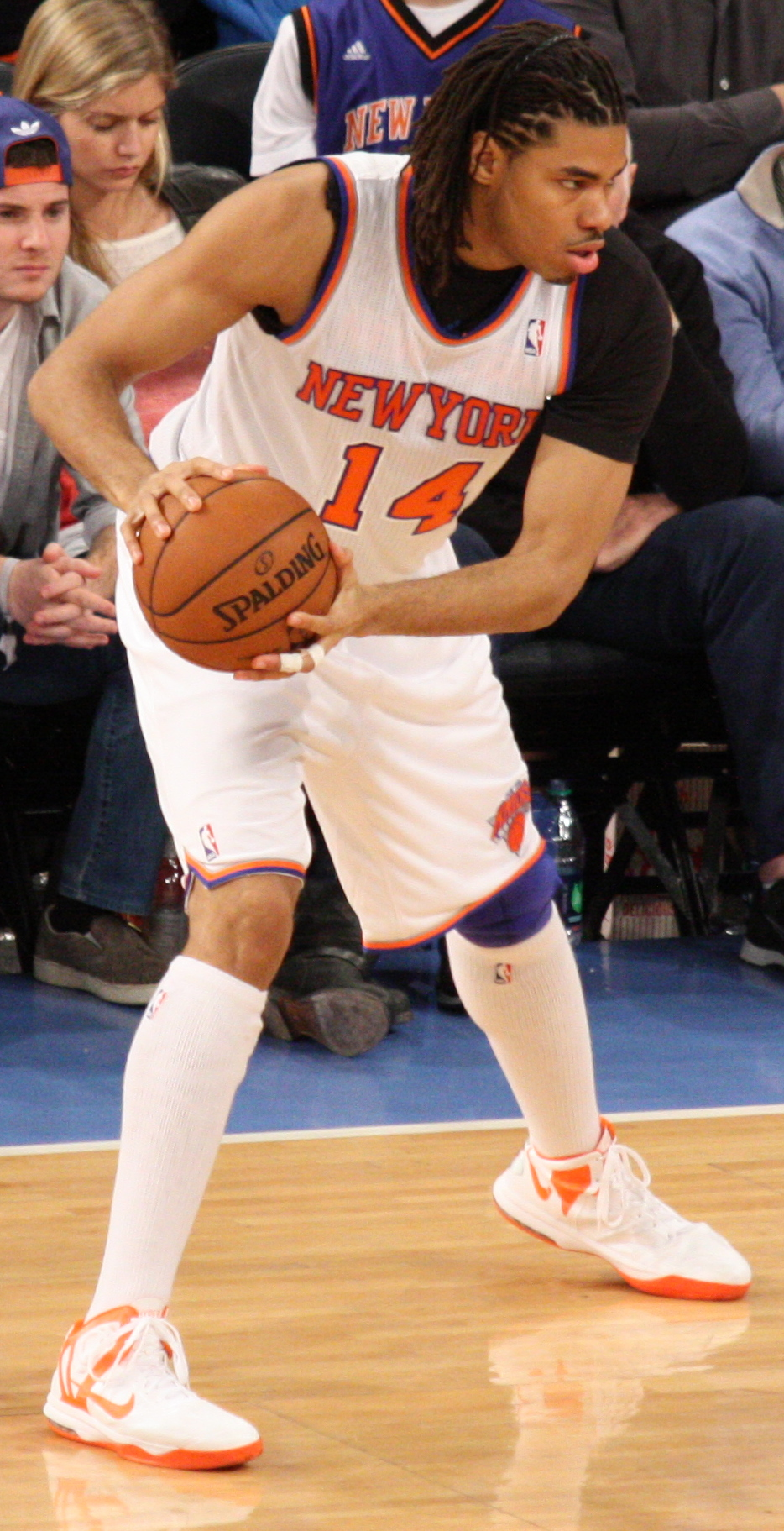
Chris Copeland was the German League's Top Scorer, in 2010.

Note: Flags indicate national team eligibility at FIBA-sanctioned events. Players may hold other non-FIBA nationalities not displayed.

| Season | Player | Nationality | Club | PPG | Ref. |
By Scoring Average (1990–91 to present)
| 1990–91 | Greg Wendt | United States | TuS Bramsche | 36.3 | |
| 1991–92 | Greg Wendt (2×) | United States | TuS Bramsche | 30.6 | |
| 1992–93 | Greg Wendt (3×) | United States | TuS Bramsche | 25.6 | |
| 1993–94 | Sergei Babkov | Russia | TBB Trier | 24.1 | |
| 1994–95 | Bernard Thompson | United States | TBB Trier | 23.9 | |
| 1995–96 | Tony Dawson | United States | TSV 04 Leverkusen | 28.6 | |
| 1996–97 | Donald Williams | United States | Hertener Löwen | 25.3 | |
| 1997–98 | Keith Gatlin | United States | Gießen 46ers | 23.3 | |
| 1998–99 | Dirk Nowitzki | Germany | DJK Würzburg | 22.5 | |
| 1999–00 | Tyron McCoy | United States | TV 1860 Lich | 23.1 | |
| 2000–01 | John Best | United States | Bayer Giants Leverkusen | 22.9 | |
| 2001–02 | DeJuan Collins | United States | SV 03 Tübingen | 24.0 | |
| 2002–03 | BJ McKie | United States | Gießen 46ers | 25.0 | |
| 2003–04 | BJ McKie (2×) | United States | TBB Trier | 22.1 | |
| 2004–05 | Narcisse Ewodo | France | BG Karlsruhe | 21.0 | |
| 2005–06 | Andrew Wisniewski | United States | Baskets Bonn | 20.6 | |
| 2006–07 | Derrick Allen | United States | Bayer Giants Leverkusen | 16.5 | |
| 2007–08 | Timothy Black | United States | Paderborn Baskets | 21.3 | |
| 2008–09 | Omari Westley | United States | Giants Nördlingen | 15.9 | |
| 2009–10 | Chris Copeland | United States | TBB Trier | 16.9 | |
| 2010–11 | DaShaun Wood | United States | Deutsche Bank Skyliners | 18.9 | |
| 2011–12 | Bobby Brown | United States | EWE Baskets Oldenburg | 16.9 | |
| 2012–13 | Davin White | United States | Phoenix Hagen | 17.1 | |
| 2013–14 | Darius Adams | Bulgaria | Eisbären Bremerhaven | 18.0 | |
| 2014–15 | D. J. Kennedy | United States | MHP Riesen Ludwigsburg | 18.0 | |
| 2015–16 | Kyle Fogg | United States | Eisbären Bremerhaven | 18.2 | |
| 2016–17 | Raymar Morgan | United States | ratiopharm Ulm | 17.7 | |
| 2017–18 | Philip Scrubb | Canada | Fraport Skyliners | 18.3 | |
| 2018–19 | Will Cummings | United States | EWE Baskets Oldenburg | 20.5 | |
| 2019–20 | No award was given, due to the shortened season because of the COVID-19 pandemic. | | | | |
| 2020–21 | Michał Michalak | Poland | Mitteldeutscher BC | 20.5 | |
| 2021–22 | T. J. Shorts | United States | Crailsheim Merlins | 20.6 | |
| 2022–23 | DeWayne Russell | United States | Baskets Oldenburg | 20.3 | |
| 2023–24 | Otis Livingston II | United States | Würzburg Baskets | 20.5 | |
| 2024–25 | Jarred Ogungbemi-Jackson Brandon Randolph | Canada; United States | Riesen Ludwigsburg; Rasta Vechta | 19.0 | |
| 2025–26 | Chris Clemons | United States | Baskets Oldenburg | 18.5 | |

== Players with most top-scorer awards ==
| Player | Awards | Editions |
|---|---|---|
| (United States) Greg Wendt | 3 | 1991-1993 |
| (Germany) Mike Jackel | 2 | 1985, 1987 |
| (Germany) Dieter Sarodnick | 2 | 1967, 1968 |
| (Germany) Volkmar Knopke | 2 | 1969, 1970 |
| (United States) BJ McKie | 2 | 2003, 2004 |

== Awards won by nationality ==
| Country | Total |
|---|---|
| United States | 39 |
| West Germany / Germany | 11 |
| Canada | 2 |
| Bulgaria | 1 |
| Czechoslovakia | 1 |
| France | 1 |
| Poland | 1 |
| Russia | 1 |
| Soviet Union | 1 |
| Yugoslavia | 1 |
