= Michael Jackel =

Canadian-German basketball player

Personal information
- Born: October 19, 1959 (age 67) Vancouver, British Columbia, Canada
- Listed height: 6 ft 7 in (2.01 m)
- Listed weight: 212 lb (96 kg)

Career information
- College: Simon Fraser (1978–1982)
- NBA draft: 1981: undrafted
- Playing career: 1982–1999
- Position: Small forward

Career history
- 1982: MTV Wolfenbüttel
- 1982–1985: ASC 1846 Göttingen
- 1985–1988: BSC Saturn Köln
- 1988–1989: DBV Charlottenburg
- 1990–1997: TTL Bamberg
- 1997–1999: SG Braunschweig

Career highlights
- 4× German champion (1983, 1984, 1987, 1988; 4× German Cup winner (1982, 1984, 1985, 1992); German Player of the Year (1988); 2× Bundesliga Top Scorer (1985, 1987); Bundesliga All-Time Top Scorer; NAIA Top Scorer (1982); NAIA All-America Second Team (1982); Simon Fraser Athletics Hall of Fame (1994); British Columbia Basketball Hall of Fame (2003)
Medals
Men's basketball
Representing Germany
FIBA EuroBasket
Gold medal – first place	1993 West Germany

Michael Jackel, or Mike Jackel (alternate spelling: Jaeckel, born October 19, 1959, in Vancouver, British Columbia) is a Canadian–German former professional basketball player. At a height of 6 ft 7 in (2.01 m) tall, he played at the small forward position. He was the first player to score more than 10,000 points in Germany's top-tier level Basketball Bundesliga (BBL), and he is also that same league's all-time career scoring leader. As a member of the senior men's German national team, Jackel won the gold medal at the 1993 FIBA EuroBasket.

== College career ==
The son of German parents who had migrated to Canada, Jackel played college basketball at Simon Fraser University, from 1978 to 1982. He scored 1,940 points for the Clan, leaving as the second leading scorer in SFU history, behind Jay Triano. Posting 28.9 points per contest, he led the NAIA in scoring his senior year (1981–82), which earned him NAIA All-America Second Team honors that season. Jackel had two 47 point games during his senior season.

Jackel was inducted into SFU's Athletics Hall of Fame in 1994. He was inducted into the British Columbia Basketball Hall of Fame in 2003.

== Professional career ==
Jackel spent his 17-year-long professional club career entirely in the German top-flight Basketball Bundesliga (BBL). He played with Wolfenbüttel (1982), Göttingen (1982–1985), Köln (1985–1988; 1989–1990), DBV Charlottenburg (1988–1989), Bamberg (1990–1997), and Braunschweig (1997–1999). He won four German League championships and four German Cup titles. In December 1996, Jackel became the first player in the history of the Bundesliga to surpass the 10,000 career total points scored mark. Jackel finished his professional club career in 1999, with 10,783 career total points scored, which made him the all-time leading scorer in the league.

== National team career ==
Between 1984 and 1993, Jackel gained a total of 113 caps with the senior German men's national team, in which he averaged 19.2 points per game. In the 1992 Summer Olympic Games, in Barcelona, he was Germany's second-leading scorer behind Detlef Schrempf, with a scoring average of 14.1 points per game. Jackel had a 15-point performance in Germany's game against the Original Dream Team. At the 1993 FIBA EuroBasket, Jackel averaged 11 points a game, en route to helping Germany win the tournament's gold medal.

== Personal life ==
After he retired from his professional basketball club playing career, Jackel returned to his native Canada.
