= Dirk Bauermann =

German basketball coach (born 1957)

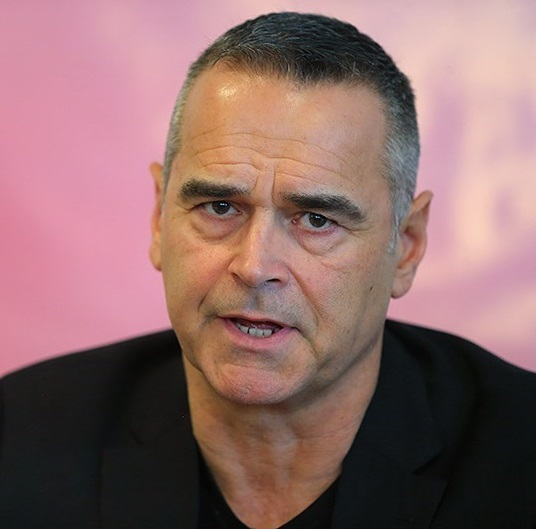
- Bauermann in 2016

Personal information
- Born: 10 December 1957 (age 68) Oberhausen, West Germany

Career information
- NBA draft: 1979: undrafted
- Playing career: 1975–1981
- Position: Head coach
- Coaching career: 1989–present

Career history

Playing
- 1975–1981: BBC Krefeld

Coaching
- 1986–1988: Fresno State (assistant)
- 1988–1989: Bayer Leverkusen (assistant)
- 1989–1998: Bayer Leverkusen
- 1994: Germany
- 1998–1999: Oostende
- 1999–2000: Apollon Patras
- 2000–2001: BBV Hagen
- 2001: Dafnis
- 2001–2008: Brose Baskets
- 2003–2011: Germany
- 2010–2012: Bayern Munich
- 2013: Lietuvos rytas
- 2013–2014: Poland
- 2014–2015: Krasny Oktyabr
- 2015–2017: Iran
- 2016–2018: s.Oliver Würzburg
- 2018–2019: Sichuan Blue Whales
- 2019: Pınar Karşıyaka
- 2020–2021: Rostock Seawolves
- 2020–2022: Tunisia

Career highlights
- As a head coach: 4× German League Coach of the Year (1990, 1991, 2003, 2004)
Medals
Men's basketball
Head Coach for Germany
EuroBasket
Silver medal – second place	2005 Serbia and Montenegro	Team
Head Coach for Iran
FIBA Asia Championship
Bronze medal – third place	2015 Changsha	Team
Head Coach for Tunisia
FIBA AfroBasket
Gold medal – first place	2021 Rwanda	Team

Dirk Bauermann (born 10 December 1957) is a German professional basketball coach.

== Playing career ==
Bauermann played club basketball in the German senior club of BBC Krefeld, from 1975 to 1981.

== Club coaching career ==
Bauermann was an assistant coach at Fresno State University, with the Fresno State Bulldogs, from 1986 to 1988.

He was then an assistant coach with the German League club TSV Bayer 04 Leverkusen during the 1988-89 season, before becoming the team's head coach prior to the 1989-90 season. With Leverkusen, he won 7 German League championships and 4 German Cups, and was twice named the German League's Coach of the Year.

He then coached the Belgian League club Oostende, and after that, the Greek club Apollon Patras, which was competing in the Greek Second Division at the time.

He then coached the German League club Brandt Hagen, before coaching the Greek League club Dafni.

He coached the German League club Brose Baskets, from 2001 to 2008. With Brose, he won two German League championships, and was twice named the German League's Coach of the Year.

He next coached the German club Bayern Munich, before coaching the Lithuanian League club Lietuvos Rytas.

In 2014, he signed with Krasny Oktyabr in Russia. In 2016, he signed with German League club s.Oliver Würzburg.

On 25 May 2017, he signed with Chinese club Sichuan Blue Whales.

He has signed a 1,5 year contract with Pınar Karşıyaka on 21 February 2019. He parted ways with Pınar Karşıyaka at the end of season. In January 2020, he was named head coach of German second-tier side Rostock Seawolves. Bauermann guided Rostock to the ProA regular season championship in 2020-21 and parted company with the team at the conclusion of the season.

== National team coaching career ==
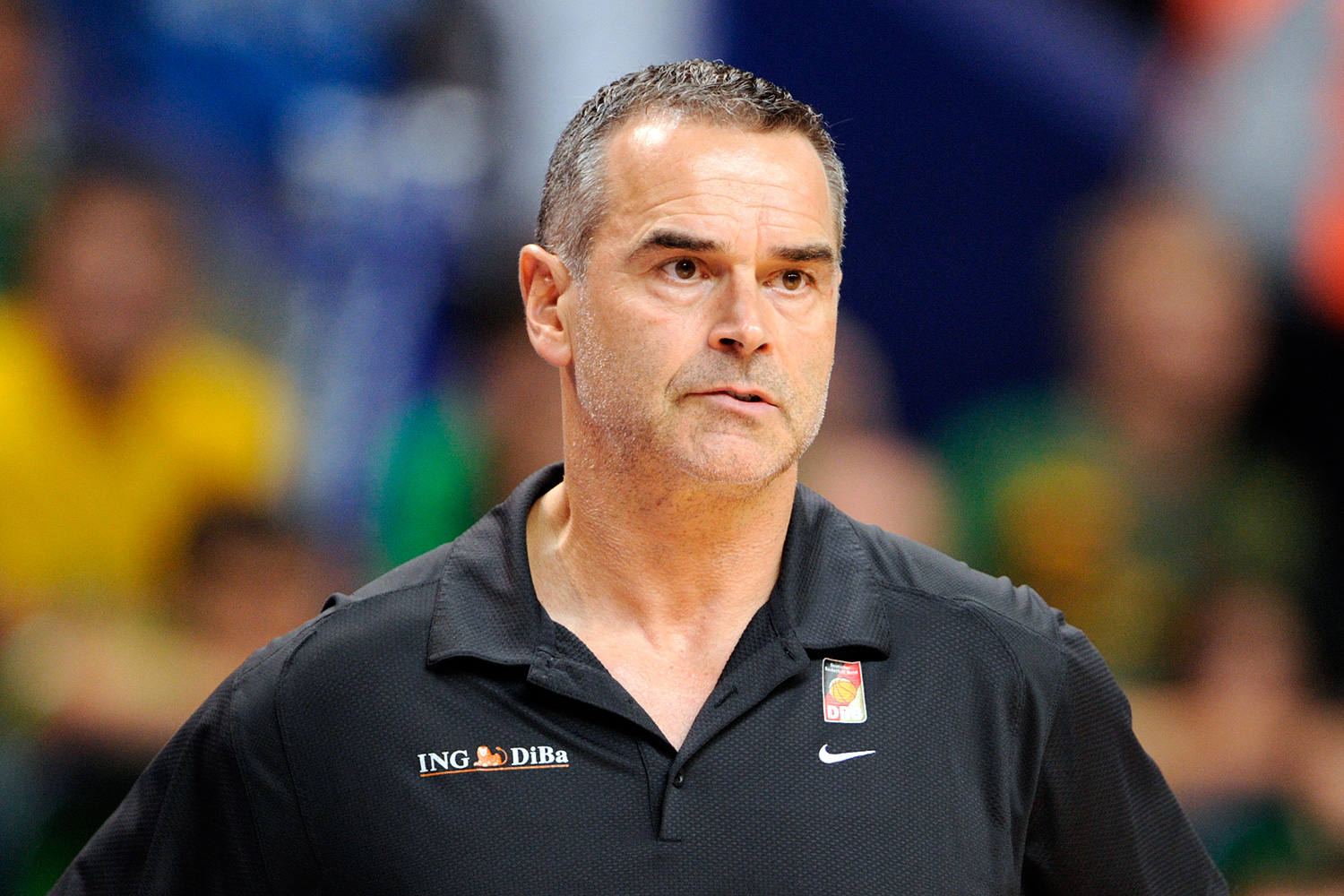
2011

Bauerman was the head coach of the senior men's German national basketball team at the 1994 FIBA World Championship. He also coached Germany at the EuroBasket 2005, where Germany won the silver medal. In addition to that, he also coached Germany at the following tournaments: the 2006 FIBA World Championship, the EuroBasket 2007, the 2008 Summer Olympic Games, the EuroBasket 2009, the 2010 FIBA World Championship, and the EuroBasket 2011.

He became the head coach of the Polish national basketball team in 2013. He led his team to a disappointing EuroBasket 2013, recording only one win. In January 2014 he decided to not extend his contract.

He became the head coach of the Iranian national basketball team in 2015. With Iran he won the bronze medal at the 2015 FIBA Asia Championship. He stepped down from his post as head coach of the Iranian national team in January 2017, shortly after agreeing terms with s.Oliver Würzburg.

In 2021, he guided Tunisia to gold at the FIBA AfroBasket. Bauermann stepped back as Tunisia's head coach in September 2022 for personal reasons.

== Honors ==
As head coach:

- International Championships:
  - FIBA African Championship: 2021
- National Championships:
  - 9× German League champion: 1990, 1991, 1992, 1993, 1994, 1995, 1996, 2005, 2007
- National Cups:
  - 4× German Cup winner: 1990, 1991, 1993, 1995
- Individual:
  - 4× German League Coach of the Year: 1990, 1991, 2003, 2004
