= Chris Fleming (basketball) =

American basketball coach (born 1970)

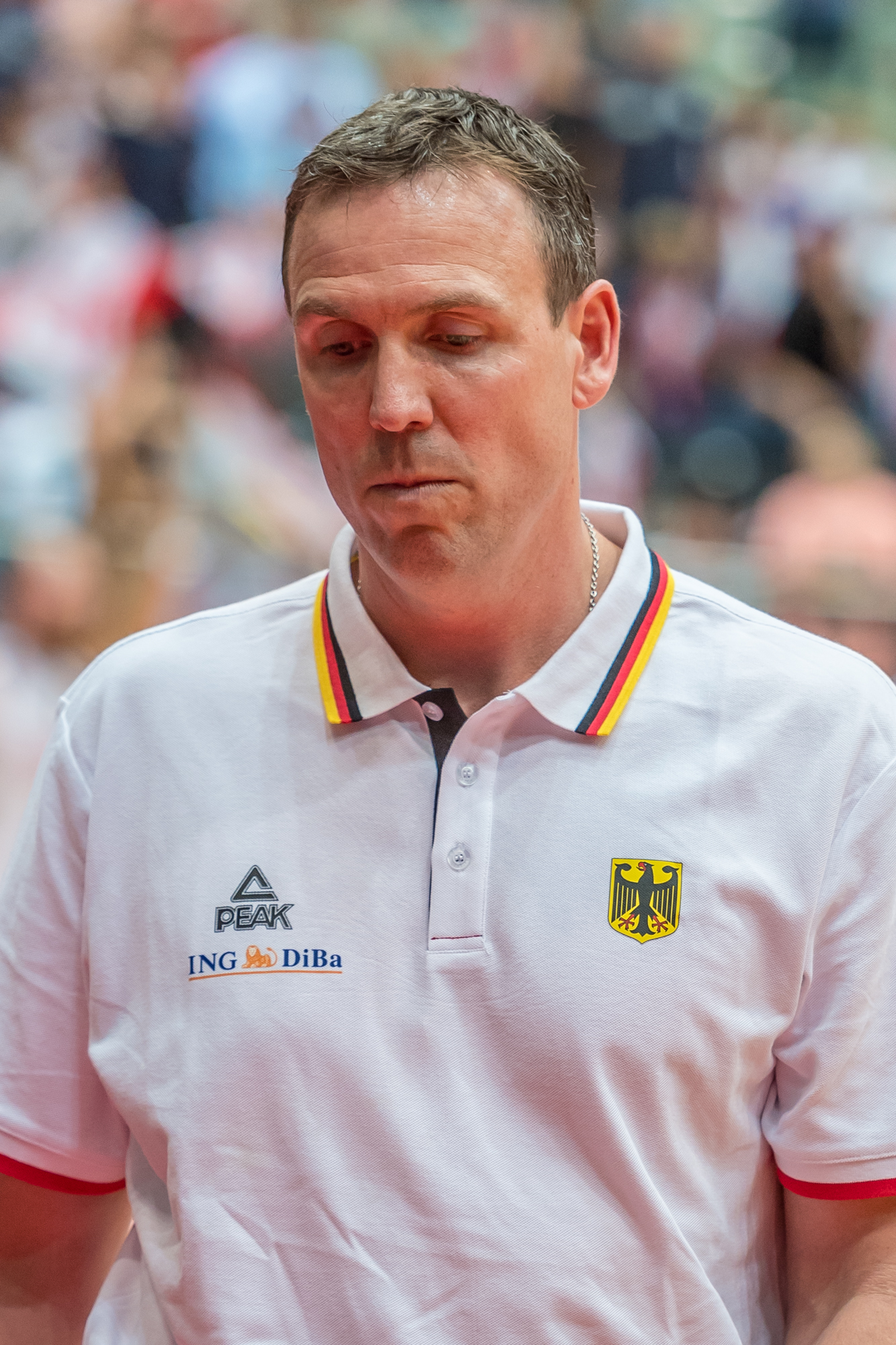
- Fleming with Germany in 2016

Alabama Crimson Tide
- Position: Assistant coach
- League: Southeastern Conference

Personal information
- Born: March 3, 1970 (age 56)
- Listed height: 6 ft 3 in (1.91 m)

Career information
- High school: Lacey Township (Lacey Township, New Jersey)
- College: Richmond (1989–1993)
- NBA draft: 1993: undrafted
- Playing career: 1994–2000

Career history

Playing
- 1994–2000: Quakenbrücker TSV

Coaching
- 1998–1999: Quakenbrücker TSV (assistant)
- 2000–2008: Quakenbrücker TSV / Artland Dragons
- 2005: Germany Under-20
- 2008–2014: Brose Baskets
- 2014–2017: Germany
- 2015–2016: Denver Nuggets (assistant)
- 2016–2019: Brooklyn Nets (assistant)
- 2019–2020: Chicago Bulls (lead assistant)
- 2020–2024: Chicago Bulls (assistant)
- 2024–2025: Portland Trail Blazers (assistant)
- 2025–present: Alabama (assistant)

Career highlights
- As coach: 4× German Cup winner (2008, 2010–2012); 4× Bundesliga champion (2010–2013); 3× German Supercup winner (2010–2012); Bundesliga Coach of the Year (2011)

Chris Fleming (born March 3, 1970) is an American basketball coach who is as an assistant coach for the Alabama Crimson Tide men's basketball team. He was also a professional basketball player, who spent his whole pro playing career with the German 2nd Division club Quakenbrücker TSV.

== Playing career ==
=== College ===
Fleming grew up in Long Beach Island, New Jersey, before moving to Forked River, New Jersey with his family, when he was ten years of age. After playing high school basketball at Lacey Township High School, Fleming played college basketball at the University of Richmond, with the Richmond Spiders.

=== Professional ===
Fleming played professional basketball from 1994 to 2000, with the German 2nd Division club Quakenbrücker TSV, based in the city of Quakenbrück. That is where he met his wife Anne.

== Coaching career ==
Fleming began his coaching career as an assistant basketball coach with QTSV in 1998. In 2000, he became the head coach of QTSV and remained in that job until 2008. He guided the Quakenbrück-based team to promotion to the German top-flight level Basketball-Bundesliga, and to a German Cup title in 2008. He then became the head coach of Brose Bamberg in 2008. In October 2012, he extended his contract with Brose Baskets through 2016. However, in May 2014, Fleming parted ways with the club. Under Fleming's guidance, Bamberg captured four German championships and three German Cup titles. Fleming also received Bundesliga Coach of the Year honors in 2011.

Fleming was a member of the coaching staff of the San Antonio Spurs at the 2014 NBA Summer League. In November 2014, he was appointed the new coach of the senior German national basketball team, by the German Basketball Federation. In July 2015, Fleming was named an assistant coach of the Denver Nuggets. On July 5, 2016, Fleming was named an assistant coach of the Brooklyn Nets. His last game as head coach of the German national team was a 72–84 loss to Spain in the quarterfinals of the 2017 European Championships. He had opted to focus solely on his job as assistant coach at the Brooklyn Nets.

On July 3, 2019, Fleming got hired by the Chicago Bulls as an assistant coach. Fleming was retained by new head coach Billy Donovan prior to the 2020-21 NBA season. On December 24, 2021, he was named as the Bulls' interim head coach as Donovan entered NBA's COVID-19 protocol. The Bulls went 5–0 with Fleming as acting head coach. His tenure with the Bulls came to a close at the end of the 2023–24 season.

Fleming spent the 2024–25 NBA season as an assistant coach for the Portland Trail Blazers. On April 30, 2025, Fleming and the Trail Blazers parted ways.

== Awards and accomplishments ==
=== Coaching career ===
- 4x German Cup Winner: (2008, 2010, 2011, 2012)
- 4x German League Champion: (2010, 2011, 2012, 2013)
- 3x German Supercup Winner: (2010, 2011, 2012)
- German League Coach of the Year: (2011)
