= List of German basketball champions =

List of German basketball champions:

The German club Bayer Giants Leverkusen (formerly known as TSV Bayer 04 Leverkusen and TuS 04 Leverkusen) currently holds the record for the most German basketball men's championships won, having won 14 championships.

== West German / German champions (men) ==
=== German championship (1938–1966) ===
- 1938–39 LSV Spandau (1)
- 1939-46 Not held due to World War II
- 1946–47 MTSV Schwabing (1)
- 1947–48 Turnerbund Heidelberg (1)
- 1948–49 MTSV Schwabing (2)
- 1949–50 Stuttgart-Degerloch (1)
- 1950–51 Turnerbund Heidelberg (2)
- 1951–52 Turnerbund Heidelberg (3)
- 1952–53 Turnerbund Heidelberg (4)
- 1953–54 Bayern Munich (1)
- 1954–55 Bayern Munich (2)
- 1955–56 ATV Düsseldorf (1)
- 1956–57 USC Heidelberg (1)
- 1957–58 USC Heidelberg (2)
- 1958–59 USC Heidelberg (3)
- 1959–60 USC Heidelberg (4)
- 1960–61 USC Heidelberg (5)
- 1961–62 USC Heidelberg (6)
- 1962–63 Alemannia Aachen (1)
- 1963–64 Alemannia Aachen (2)
- 1964–65 MTV 1846 Gießen (1)
- 1965–66 USC Heidelberg (7)

=== Basketball Bundesliga (1966–present) ===
†	Champion also won BBL-Pokal
‡	Champion also won BBL-Pokal and BBL Champions Cup

Season	Champion	Finals score	Runners-up	Champions' coach	Finals MVP
1966–67	Gießen (2)	85–73	VfL Osnabrück	(Hungary) Laszlo Lakfalvi	—N/a
1967–68	Gießen (3)	79–69	VfL Osnabrück	(Hungary) Laszlo Lakfalvi	—N/a
1968–69	VfL Osnabrück (1)	76–69	Gießen	(Czech Republic) Miloslav Kříž	—N/a
1969–70	Bayer 04 Leverkusen (1)	76–73	Gießen	(Germany) Günter Hagedorn	—N/a
1970–71	Bayer 04 Leverkusen (2)	158–136	USC Munich	(Germany) Günter Hagedorn	—N/a
1971–72	Bayer 04 Leverkusen (3)	150–142	Gießen	(Germany) Günter Hagedorn	—N/a
1972–73	Heidelberg (12)	141–140	Gießen		—N/a
1973–74	Hagen (1)	137–118	Heidelberg		—N/a
1974–75	Gießen (4)	140–136	Heidelberg	(Germany) Dietfried Kienast	—N/a
1975–76	Bayer 04 Leverkusen (4)	—N/a	Wolfenbüttel		—N/a
1976–77	Heidelberg (13)	—N/a	Gießen		—N/a
1977–78	Gießen (5)	—N/a	Heidelberg		—N/a
1978–79	Bayer 04 Leverkusen (5)	—N/a	Gießen		—N/a
1979–80	SSC Göttingen (1)	—N/a	Bayer 04 Leverkusen		—N/a
1980–81	Saturn Köln (1)	—N/a	Bayer 04 Leverkusen		—N/a
1981–82	Saturn Köln (2)	—N/a	ASC Göttingen		—N/a
1982–83	ASC Göttingen (2)	2–0	Saturn Köln		—N/a
1983–84	ASC Göttingen (3)	2–0	Saturn Köln		—N/a
1984–85	Bayer 04 Leverkusen (6)	2–0	DTV Charlottenburg		—N/a
1985–86	Bayer 04 Leverkusen (7)	2–0	Saturn Köln		—N/a
1986–87	Saturn Köln (3)	2–0	Bayer 04 Leverkusen	(United States) Tony DiLeo	—N/a
1987–88	Saturn Köln (4)	2–0	Bayer 04 Leverkusen	(United States) Tony DiLeo	—N/a
1988–89	Bayreuth (1)	3–1	Bayer 04 Leverkusen	(United States) Lester Habegger	—N/a
1989–90	Bayer 04 Leverkusen (8)	3–1	Bayreuth	(Germany) Dirk Bauermann	—N/a
1990–91	Bayer 04 Leverkusen (9)	3–2	Charlottenburg	(Germany) Dirk Bauermann	—N/a
1991–92	Bayer 04 Leverkusen (10)	3–2	Alba Berlin	(Germany) Dirk Bauermann	—N/a
1992–93	Bayer 04 Leverkusen (11)	3–1	Bamberg	(Germany) Dirk Bauermann	—N/a
1993–94	Bayer 04 Leverkusen (12)	3–0	Brandt Hagen	(Germany) Dirk Bauermann	—N/a
1994–95	Bayer 04 Leverkusen (13)	3–0	Alba Berlin	(Germany) Dirk Bauermann	—N/a
1995–96	Bayer 04 Leverkusen (14)	3–1	Alba Berlin	(Germany) Dirk Bauermann	—N/a
1996–97	Alba Berlin (1)	3–0	Ulm	(Federal Republic of Yugoslavia) Svetislav Pešić	—N/a
1997–98	Alba Berlin (2)	3–0	Ulm	(Federal Republic of Yugoslavia) Svetislav Pešić	—N/a
1998–99	Alba Berlin (3)	3–2	Bonn	(Federal Republic of Yugoslavia) Svetislav Pešić	—N/a
1999–2000	Alba Berlin (4)	3–0	Bayer 04 Leverkusen	(Federal Republic of Yugoslavia) Svetislav Pešić	—N/a
2000–01	Alba Berlin (5)	3–0	Bonn	(Bosnia and Herzegovina) Emir Mutapčić	—N/a
2001–02	Alba Berlin (6)	3–0	Köln 99ers	(Bosnia and Herzegovina) Emir Mutapčić	—N/a
2002–03	Alba Berlin (7)	3–0	Bamberg	(Bosnia and Herzegovina) Emir Mutapčić	—N/a
2003–04	Skyliners Frankfurt (1)	3–2	Bamberg	(Canada) Gordon Herbert	—N/a
2004–05	Bamberg (1)	3–2	Skyliners Frankfurt	(Germany) Dirk Bauermann	(United States) Chris Williams
2005–06	Köln 99ers (1)	3–1	Alba Berlin	(Serbia) Saša Obradović	(United States) Immanuel McElroy
2006–07	Bamberg (2)	3–1	Artland Dragons	(Germany) Dirk Bauermann	(United States) Casey Jacobsen
2007–08	Alba Berlin (8)	3–1	Bonn	(Montenegro) Luka Pavićević	(United States) Julius Jenkins
2008–09	Oldenburg (1)	3–2	Bonn	(Bosnia and Herzegovina) Predrag Krunić	(United States) Rickey Paulding
2009–10	Bamberg† (3)	3–2	Skyliners Frankfurt	(United States) Chris Fleming	(United States) Casey Jacobsen
2010–11	Bamberg‡ (4)	3–2	Alba Berlin	(United States) Chris Fleming	(United States) Kyle Hines
2011–12	Bamberg‡ (5)	3–0	Ulm	(United States) Chris Fleming	(United States) P. J. Tucker
2012–13	Bamberg (6)	3–0	Oldenburg	(United States) Chris Fleming	(Slovakia) Anton Gavel
2013–14	Bayern Munich (3)	3–1	Alba Berlin	(Serbia) Svetislav Pešić	(United States) Malcolm Delaney
2014–15	Bamberg (7)	3–2	Bayern Munich	(Italy) Andrea Trinchieri	(United States) Brad Wanamaker
2015–16	Bamberg (8)	3–0	Ulm	(Italy) Andrea Trinchieri	(United States) Darius Miller
2016–17	Bamberg (9)	3–0	Oldenburg	(Italy) Andrea Trinchieri	(France) Fabien Causeur
2017–18	Bayern Munich† (4)	3–2	Alba Berlin	(Montenegro) Dejan Radonjić	(Germany) Danilo Barthel
2018–19	Bayern Munich (5)	3–0	Alba Berlin	(Montenegro) Dejan Radonjić	(Bosnia and Herzegovina) Nihad Đedović
2019–20	Alba Berlin (9)	163–139 (Note: The season was finished in a tournament format due to the COVID-19 pandemic in Germany.)	Riesen Ludwigsburg	(Spain) Aíto García Reneses	(United States) Marcos Knight
2020–21	Alba Berlin (10)	3–1	Bayern Munich	(Spain) Aíto García Reneses	(Uruguay) Jayson Granger
2021–22	Alba Berlin (11)	3–1	Bayern Munich	(Spain) Israel González	(Germany) Johannes Thiemann
2022–23	Ratiopharm Ulm (1)	3–1	Telekom Baskets Bonn	(Slovakia) Anton Gavel	(Brazil) Yago dos Santos
2023–24	Bayern Munich (6)	3–1	Alba Berlin	(Spain) Pablo Laso	(United States) Carsen Edwards
2024–25	Bayern Munich (7)	3–2	Ratiopharm Ulm	(Canada) Gordon Herbert	(United States) Shabazz Napier

== East German champions (men) ==
1990: BSG AdW Berlin
1989: HSG TU Magdeburg
1988: HSG TU Magdeburg
1987: BSG AdW Berlin
1986: BSG AdW Berlin
1985: BSG AdW Berlin
1984: BSG AdW Berlin
1983: BSG AdW Berlin
1982: BSG AdW Berlin
1981: BSG AdW Berlin
1980: BSG AdW Berlin
1979: BSG AdW Berlin
1978: BSG AdW Berlin
1977: HSG K-M-U Leipzig
1976: HSG K-M-U Leipzig
1975: HSG K-M-U Leipzig
1974: BSG AdW Berlin
1973: HSG K-M-U Leipzig
1972: SK KPV 69 Halle
1971: HSG K-M-U Leipzig
1970: SK KPV 69 Halle
1969: ASK Vorwärts Leipzig
1968: ASK Vorwärts Leipzig
1967: ASK Vorwärts Leipzig
1966: ASK Vorwärts Leipzig
1965: ASK Vorwärts Leipzig
1964: SC Chemie Halle
1963: SC Chemie Halle
1962: ASK Vorwärts Halle
1961: HSG Humboldt-Universität Berlin
1960: HSG Humboldt-Universität Berlin
1959: HSG Humboldt-Universität Berlin
1958: HSG Humboldt-Universität Berlin
1957: HSG Wiss. HU Berlin
1956: HSG Wiss. HU Berlin
1955: HSG Wiss. HU Berlin
1954: HSG Wiss. HU Berlin
1953: HSG Wiss. HU Berlin

=== Number Of Titles ===
Team	Winner	Years
BSG AdW Berlin	12	1974, 1978, 1979, 1980, 1981, 1982, 1983, 1984, 1985, 1986, 1987, 1990
HSG Wissenschaft HU Berlin	9	1953, 1954, 1955, 1956, 1957, 1958, 1959, 1960, 1961
ASK Vorwärts Leipzig	5	1965, 1966, 1967, 1968, 1969
HSG KMU Leipzig	5	1971, 1973, 1975, 1976, 1977
SC Chemie Halle/SG KPV 69 Halle	4	1963, 1964, 1970, 1972
HSG TU Magdeburg	2	1988, 1989
ASK Vorwärts Halle	1	1962

== German champions (women) ==
2025 Rutronik Stars Keltern
2024 Alba Berlin
2023 Rutronik Stars Keltern
2022 Eisvögel USC Freiburg
2021 Rutronik Stars Keltern
2020 Canceled due to the COVID-19 pandemic in Germany
2019 Herner TC
2018 Rutronik Stars Keltern
2017 TSV 1880 Wasserburg
2016 TSV 1880 Wasserburg
2015 TSV 1880 Wasserburg
2014 TSV 1880 Wasserburg
2013 TSV 1880 Wasserburg
2012 Wolfenbüttel Wildcats
2011 TSV 1880 Wasserburg
2010: TV 1872 Saarlouis Royals
2009: TV 1872 Saarlouis Royals
2008: TSV 1880 Wasserburg
2007: TSV 1880 Wasserburg
2006: TSV 1880 Wasserburg
2005: TSV 1880 Wasserburg
2004: TSV 1880 Wasserburg
2003: BC Marburg
2002: BTV Gold-Zack Wuppertal
2001: BTV Gold-Zack Wuppertal
2000: BTV Wuppertal
1999: BTV Wuppertal
1998: BTV Wuppertal
1997: BTV Wuppertal
1996: BTV Wuppertal
1995: BTV Wuppertal
1994: BTV Wuppertal
1993: Barmer TV 1846
1992: Lotus München
1991: DJK Agon 08 Düsseldorf
1990: DJK Agon 08 Düsseldorf
1989: Barmer TV 1846
1988: DJK Agon 08 Düsseldorf
1987: DJK Agon 08 Düsseldorf
1986: DJK Agon 08 Düsseldorf
1985: DJK Agon 08 Düsseldorf
1984: DJK Agon 08 Düsseldorf
1983: DJK Agon 08 Düsseldorf
1982: DJK Agon 08 Düsseldorf
1981: DJK Agon 08 Düsseldorf
1980: DJK Agon 08 Düsseldorf
1979: TuS 04 Leverkusen
1978: TuS 04 Leverkusen
1977: Düsseldorfer BG ART/TVG
1976: Düsseldorfer BG ART/TVG
1975: DJK Agon 08 Düsseldorf
1974: 1. SC 05 Göttingen
1973: Heidelberger SC
1972: 1. SC 05 Göttingen
1971: 1. SC 05 Göttingen
1970: 1. SC 05 Göttingen
1969: VfL Lichtenrade Berlin
1968: 1. SC 05 Göttingen
1967: ATV 1877 Düsseldorf
1966: SV Schwaben Augsburg
1965: ATV 1877 Düsseldorf
1964: TV Augsburg 1847
1963: Heidelberger TV 1846
1962: TV Groß-Gerau
1961: TV Augsburg 1847
1960: Heidelberger TV 1846
1959: Heidelberger TV 1846
1958: Heidelberger TV 1846
1957: Heidelberger TV 1846
1956: Heidelberger TV 1846
1955: Heidelberger TV 1846
1954: TSG Heidelberg 1846
1953: Neuköllner SF Berlin
1952: Turnerbund Heidelberg
1951: TC Jahn 1883 München
1950: TC Jahn 1883 München
1949: TSC Spandau 1880
1948: TC Jahn 1883 München
1947: TC Jahn 1883 München

== See also ==
- German Basketball League
- German Basketball League Awards
- German Basketball Cup
- German Basketball Supercup
- German League All-Star Game

== Sources ==
- All Championship finals and scores
- EuroBasket: Previous German league title holders.
