= Calvin Oldham =

American basketball player and coach

Calvin Oldham (born February 19, 1961) is an American professional basketball coach and former professional player. He played collegiately at Virginia Tech, before embarking on a professional career in Germany. Oldham has been a professional basketball coach since 1995.

== Playing career ==
A 6’9’’ (205cm) power forward, Oldham turned professional after graduating from Virginia Tech in 1982. In his senior year, he led the Hokies in rebounding (7.3rpg), while scoring 7.4 points a contest.

Oldham took up an offer from Steiner Bayreuth of the German Basketball Bundesliga in 1983 and played for the team until 1990. He was a key part of Bayreuth’s double-winning 1988-89 campaign, when the club captured the German championship as well as the German Basketball Cup title. In 2013, Bayreuth media outlet "Nordbayerischer Kurier" described him as "one of the most important and most popular players in the history of Bayreuth basketball."

After leaving Bayreuth in 1990, Oldham spent a single season with fellow Bundesliga side BG Charlottenburg (1990–91) with CBA's Wichita Falls Texans (1991–92), before concluding his playing career with a three-year stint as a member of SSV Ulm in the German Bundesliga.

== Coaching career ==
Prior to becoming head coach at Bayreuth in 1996, Oldham served as an assistant coach with the club during the 1995-96 campaign. Following a two-year stint at the Bayreuth helm, he accepted the head coaching position at Bayer Leverkusen in 1998. During his four-year tenure, he guided the Leverkusen team to the Bundesliga finals in 2000 and to semifinal appearances in 1999 and 2001.

Oldham worked as a scout for the Toronto Raptors of the NBA in 2002-03 and was a member of the coaching staff (assistant coach in 2003-04, associate head coach in 2004-05) of Maine Black Bears men's basketball.

From 2005 to 2007, Oldham served as associate head coach of Alba Berlin alongside Henrik Rödl, winning the Bundesliga regular season championship both years and advancing to the finals in 2006.

Oldham worked as an assistant coach for KCC Egis of the Korean Basketball League (KBL) between 2007 and 2013, winning the KBL title in 2009 and reaching the finals one year later. In 2013, Oldham returned to Germany, taking over as head coach of Eisbären Bremerhaven. He was sacked in February 2015 after a run of seven straight losses. Prior to the 2016-17 season, he was appointed as assistant coach of the Chiba Jets of the Japanese B.League. Oldham stayed with the Jets until 2020. In 2021, he was named assistant coach of the Toyotsu Fighting Eagles Nagoya in Japan. His Nagoya stint came to a close in May 2026. Oldham signed with the Kobe Storks in July 2026, where he stepped into the assistant role once again.

== Family ==
His son C.J. Oldham played college basketball at the University of Akron and Gannon University, before embarking on a professional career which took him to Germany and Norway.
