= 2. Basketball Bundesliga =

Former Germany professional basketball league

- Sport: Basketball
- Founded: 1975
- Folded: 2007
- Country: Germany
- Continent: (European Union) FIBA Europe (Europe)
- Level on pyramid: 2nd tier
- Promotion to: Basketball Bundesliga
- Related competitions: ProA; ProB
- Website: www.zweite-basketball-bundesliga.de

The 2. Basketball Bundesliga was the second level league of the German professional basketball league system. Until the 2007–08 season, the 2. Basketball Bundesliga was replaced by two geographical divisions (North and South). Since 2007 the 2. Basketball Bundesliga now consists of two leagues, ProA and ProB. At the end of each season, the top two teams of the ProA are promoted to the Basketball Bundesliga, and the teams positioned 15th and 16th are relegated to the ProB.

== History ==
On May 3, 1974, the DBB Bundestag in Cologne decided, with only three votes against, to introduce the single-tier Basketball Bundesliga and the two-tier 2nd Bundesliga starting with the 1975-76 season. Since then, the league has been the second highest division in German basketball (below the BBL which has existed since 1966). It was divided into two divisions (North and South), each with 16 teams.

In the 2007-08 season, the 2nd BBL was restructured into a Germany-wide league and divided into two independent leagues (ProA and ProB). It was restructured to professionalize the clubs, increase the level of play and make promotion to the Basketball Bundesliga easier.

== List of champions (1976–2007) ==
For a list of champions after 2007, see ProA.

Season	North	South
1975–76	SSC Göttingen	Post Bayreuth
1976–77	FC Schalke 04	TuS Aschaffenburg
1977–78	USC Medico Münster	TV Eppelheim
1978–79	HTB 62 Hamburg	Eintracht Frankfurt
1979–80	BG Hagen	SpVgg 07 Ludwigsburg
1980–81	DTV Charlottenburg	USC Heidelberg
1981–82	FC Schalke 04	TuS Aschaffenburg
1982–83	BC Giants Osnabrück	USC Heidelberg
1983–84	FC Schalke 04	1. FC Bamberg
1984–85	TSV 1860 Hagen	TV Langen
1985–86	OSC Bremerhaven	SpVgg 07 Ludwigsburg
1986–87	Oldenburger TB	Bayern Munich
1987–88	TSV 1860 Hagen	SSV/SB Ulm
1988–89	MTV Wolfenbüttel	TV Langen
1989–90	TuS Bramsche	TV Germania Trier
1990–91	SG Braunschweig	TV Langen
1991–92	SVD 49 Dortmund	Tübinger SV
1992–93	TK Hannover	Steiner Bayreuth
1993–94	Paderborn Baskets 91	SV Oberelchingen
1994–95	Rhöndorfer TV	TG Landshut
1995–96	SV Telekom Bonn	TSV Speyer
1996–97	BCJ Hamburg	USC Freiburg
1997–98	BC Oldenburg/Westerstede	DJK S.Oliver Würzburg
1998–99	BCJ Hamburg	TV 1860 Lich
1999–2000	Oldenburger TB	Consors Falke Nürnberg
2000–01	SER Rhöndorf	WiredMinds Tübingen
2001–02	BCJ Hamburg	BG NWS Ludwigsburg
2002–03	TSV Quakenbrück	BG Karlsruhe
2003–04	Schwelmer Baskets	SV 03 Tübingen
2004–05	Eisbären Bremerhaven	RCE Falke Nürnberg
2005–06	Schröno Paderborn Baskets	Ratiopharm Ulm
2006–07	BG 74 Göttingen	POM baskets Jena

== See also ==
- ProA
- ProB
- Basketball Bundesliga
- Basketball in Germany
