= Norbert Thimm =

German basketball player (born 1949)

Personal information
- Born: August 21, 1949 (age 77) Dortmund, West Germany
- Listed height: 2.05 m (6 ft 9 in)

Career information
- Playing career: 1968–1981
- Position: Center

Career history
- 1968–1969: SSV Hagen
- 1969–1972: TuS 04 Leverkusen
- 1972–1974: Real Madrid
- 1974–1981: TuS 04 Leverkusen

Norbert Thimm (born August 21, 1949 in Dortmund, West Germany) is a retired German professional basketball player. He is 2.05 m (6 ft 9 in) tall and played the center position. He currently works for the sports management company T.E.A.M. Consulting and is president of the Basketball Bundesliga for Women.

== Professional career ==
Thimm played professional basketball for the West German Basketball Bundesliga teams SSV Hagen, TuS Bayer 04 Leverkusen and the Spanish ACB team Real Madrid. In 1972 Thimm became the first German basketball player to ever play professional basketball for an international team. Even though Thimm constantly was among Real Madrid’s top performers, he never consistently made it into the starting lineup. Besides winning two Spanish Championships and two Spanish Cups, Thimm has won five German Championships and five German Cups and remains one of the most successful German basketball players in history.

== West German national team ==
As a member of the West German national basketball team, Thimm competed at the EuroBasket 1971 and the 1972 Summer Olympics. At both tournaments he was the top-scorer of the West German team. His most noteworthy performance were 21 points at a surprising victory against Poland at the 1972 Summer Olympics.
