= FC Schalke 04 Basketball =

Schalke 04
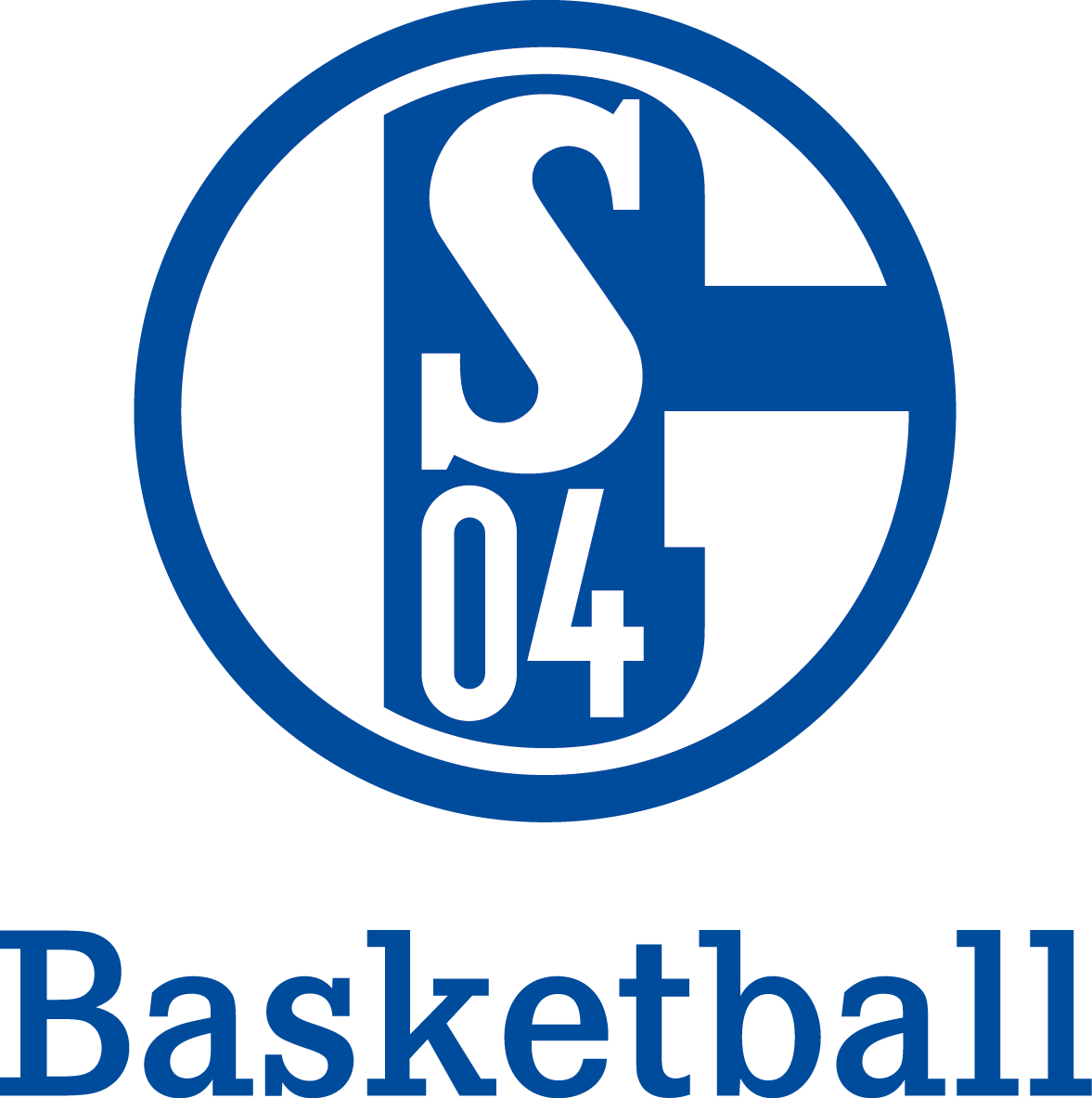
- Nickname: Die Knappen; Die Königsblauen
- Leagues: ProA
- Founded: 1974; 51 years ago
- History: Schalke 04 Basketball (1974–present)
- Arena: Halle an der Mühlbachstraße
- Capacity: 1,112
- Location: Gelsenkirchen, Germany
- Team colors: Blue, White
- President: Tobias Steinert
- Head coach: Raphael Wilder
- Championships: 3 German Second Divisions; 4 1. Regionalliga
- Website: schalke04.de/basketball
Home	Away

Schalke 04 Basketball is a German professional basketball team club in Gelsenkirchen. The team currently plays in the ProA, the German national second division. It is the basketball section of FC Schalke 04.

== History ==
The basketball department of FC Schalke 04 was founded in 1974.

In 1976-77 the club won the 2. Basketball Bundesliga and earned promotion to the National League for the following season. After relegation the returned to the top flight for the 1982-83 season.

Schalke played in the 1988–89 season in the National Basketball League Basketball Bundesliga and from 2004 for several seasons in the ProA, the second highest basketball league in Germany. 2009 saw the Schalke 04 voluntary withdrawal of Schalke 04 from the ProA.

Following the 2017-18 season, the team was promoted to the national second-tier ProA, after Scanplus Baskets resigned its promotion position.

== Honours ==
2. Basketball Bundesliga

- Champions (3): 1977, 1982, 1984

1. Regionalliga West

- Champions (4): 1975, 1987, 1995, 2016

== Season by season ==
Season	Tier	League	Pos.
2004–05	2	2. Bundesliga	15th
2005–06	2	2. Bundesliga	10th
2006–07	2	2. Bundesliga	6th
2007–08	2	ProA	14th
2008–09	2	ProA	15th (Note: Relegated to 1. Regionalliga after resigning to their place in ProB.)
2009–10	4	1. Regionalliga	11th
2010–11	4	1. Regionalliga	4th
2011–12	4	1. Regionalliga	6th
2012–13	4	1. Regionalliga	4th
2013–14	4	1. Regionalliga	3rd
2014–15	4	1. Regionalliga	4th
2015–16	4	1. Regionalliga	1st
2016–17	3	ProB	6th
2017–18	3	ProB	3rd (Note: Promoted to the ProA, after Scanplus Baskets resigned its promotion position.)

== Roster ==
Note: Flags indicate national team eligibility at FIBA-sanctioned events. Players may hold other non-FIBA nationalities not displayed.

FC Schalke 04 Basketball roster
Players
Coaches

Pos.	No.	Nat.	Name
SG	0	(United States)	Tucker Haymond
PG	1	(United States)	Shavar Newkirk
SF	2	(United States)	Lavon Hightower
SG	6	(Germany)	Marley Jean-Louis
PG	7	(United Kingdom)	Jordan Spencer
PF	11	(Germany)	Johannes Joos
SF	12	(United States)	Darnell Dunn
C	19	(Germany)	Adam Touray
G	20	(Germany)	Tomasz Szewczyk
C	22	(Germany)	Bjoern Rohwer
SF	23	(Germany)	Shawn Gulley
SG	27	(Germany)	Migel Wessel
G	32	(United States)	Courtney Belger

Head coach

(Belarus) Alexander Osipovich

Assistant coach(es)

(United States) Patrick Carney

Legend

- (C) Team captain
- Injured

- Roster
Updated: 29 January 2020

== Notable players ==
To appear in this section a player must have either:

- Set a club record or won an individual award as a professional player.
- Played at least one official international match for his senior national team at any time.

- (Germany) Moritz Kleine-Brockhoff
- (Germany) Malik El-Tamer
- (Belgium) Gael Hulsen
- (Bulgaria) Atanas Penev
- (Canada) Ryan Bell
- (Canada) Mamadou Gueye
- (Canada) Brett McKnight
- (United Kingdom) Rishi Kakad
- (United States) Cory Abercrombie
- (United States) Austin Arians
- (United States) T.J. Bannister
- (United States) Christopher Brown
- (United States) Coreontae DeBerry
- (United States) Matt Fields
- (United States) Daniel Gilbert
- (United States) Anthony Jones
- (United States) Trevin Parks
- (United States) Quentin Pryor
- (United States) Josh Steinthal
- (United States) Trent Weaver
