= SG Braunschweig =

- League: ProB
- Founded: 1978
- History: SG FT/MTV Braunschweig (1978–2007); Spot Up Medien Baskets Braunschweig (2007–2014); DRUFF! Baskets Braunschweig (2014–2015); SG Braunschweig (2015–
- Arena: Sporthalle Alte Waage
- Location: Braunschweig, Germany
- Team colors: Light blue, white, red
- Head coach: Benjamin Travnizek

SG Braunschweig is a basketball club based in Braunschweig, Germany.

== History ==
The team was formed in 1978 as a cooperation between the basketball sections of the clubs FT Braunschweig and MTV Braunschweig. The first name of the club was SG FT/MTV Braunschweig.

In 1990–91 they won the 2. Basketball Bundesliga and earned promotion to the Bundesliga. In 2000–01 the club passed its Basketball Bundesliga license to the newly founded team Metabox Braunschweig (now known as Basketball Löwen Braunschweig), and since then functions as a farm team for the Bundesliga side. From 2007 on, the team competed under the name Spot Up Medien Baskets Braunschweig for sponsorship reasons. In 2014, the name was changed into DRUFF! Baskets Braunschweig.

From 2007 to 2015, SG Braunschweig played in the ProB league, the German third division. After the 2014–15, the club sold its ProB license to the Artland Dragons. Instead, the club entered into a cooperation with MTV Herzöge Wolfenbüttel. Both clubs will field a joined ProB team from 2015 on, which will play in Wolfenbüttel, while SG Braunschweig will continue to operate its own youth teams.

On 13 September 2015, SG Braunschweig announced that they withdrew from the 5th tier 2. Regionalliga Nord-West.

== Season by season ==
Season	Tier	League	Pos.	Postseason	German Cup	European competitions
1987–88	2	2. Bundesliga North	6	Promoted	–	–
1988–89	1	Bundesliga North	12	Relegated	–	–
1989–90	2	2. Bundesliga North	5	–	–	–
1990–91	2	2. Bundesliga North	1	Promoted	Runner-up	–
1991–92	1	Bundesliga North	6	–	–	Played European Cup
1992–93	1	Bundesliga North	4	Quarter-finalist	–	–
1993–94	1	Bundesliga North	5	Relegated	–	–
1994–95	2	2. Bundesliga North	5	Promoted	–	–
1995–96	1	Bundesliga	13	–	–	–
1996–97	1	Bundesliga	8	Quarter-finalist	–	–
1997–98	1	Bundesliga	8	Quarter-finalist	–	–
1998–99	1	Bundesliga	9	Qualification round	–	–
1999–2000	1	Bundesliga	8	Qualification round	–	Played Korać Cup
2000–01	4	1. Regionalliga North		–	–	–
2001–02	4	1. Regionalliga North		Promoted	–	–
2002–03	2	2. Bundesliga North	15	–	–	–
2003–04	2	2. Bundesliga North	13	–	–	–
2004–05	2	2. Bundesliga North	6	–	–	–
2005–06	2	2. Bundesliga North	9	–	–	–
2006–07	2	2. Bundesliga North	10	Relegated	–	–
2007–08	3	ProB	8	–	–	–
2008–09	3	ProB	6	–	–	–
2009–10	3	ProB	11	–	–	–
2010–11	3	ProB North	7	Round of 16	–	–
2011–12	3	ProB North	4	Quarter-finalist	–	–
2012–13	3	ProB North	6	Round of 16	–	–
2013–14	3	ProB North	6	Round of 16	–	–
2014–15	3	ProB North	8	Round of 16	–	–
2015–16	5	Oberliga East	1	Semifinalist	–	–
2016–17	6	Oberliga East	3	Champion	–	–
2016–17	6	Oberliga East	1	Semifinalist	–	–
2017–18	5	2. Regionalliga North-West	6		–	–
2018–19	5	2. Regionalliga North-West	6	Promoted	–	–
2021–22	4	1. Regionalliga North	10		–	–
2022–23	4	1. Regionalliga North	4	Semifinalist	–	–
2023–24	4	1. Regionalliga North	10		–	–
2024–25	4	1. Regionalliga North	4	Semifinalist	–	–
2025–26	4	1. Regionalliga North	3	Semifnalist Promoted	–	–
2026–27	3	ProB North			–	–

== Notable former players ==
- (Germany) Stephen Arigbabu
- (Germany) Peter Fehse
- (Germany) Dennis Schröder (3 seasons: 2010–13)
- (Germany) Daniel Theis (2 seasons: 2010–12)
- (Netherlands) Robin Smeulders (2 seasons: 2004–06)
- (United States) Kenny Atkinson (1 season: 1998–99)
- (United States) Scooter Barry
- (United States) Steven Key
- (Czech Republic) Štefan Svitek
- (United States) Zackary Wright
- (Latvia) Igors Miglinieks
