= Goldpokal der Stadt Bremerhaven =

- Status: active
- Genre: sporting event
- Frequency: annual
- Country: West Germany
- Inaugurated: 1964
- Most recent: 1983

Goldpokal der Stadt Bremerhaven was a basketball tournament played in the town of Bremerhaven in Bremen in West Germany, consisting of a men's tournament played between 1964 and 1983 and a men's tournament played between 1965 and 1969. The tournament was open both to club teams and national teams.

== Winners ==
=== Men ===
- 1964 – Team US-Air Force
- 1965 – Blue Devils Europa
- 1966 – VfL Osnabrück
- 1967 – Netherlands
- 1968 – Sweden
- 1969 – Germany
- 1970 – Austria

- 1971 – Czechoslovakia
- 1973 – Netherlands
- 1974 – Austria
- 1976 – CSKA Moscow
- 1977 – Belgium
- 1979 – Netherlands
- 1980 – Germany

- 1981 – USSR
- 1982 – USSR
- 1983 – USSR

=== Women ===
- 1965 – US-Auswahl Heidelberg
- 1965 – ATV 77 Düsseldorf
- 1966 – Nederländerna
- 1967 – Nederländerna
- 1968 – Nederländerna
- 1969 – France
