= Casey Jacobsen =

American basketball player (born 1981)

Personal information
- Born: March 19, 1981 (age 45) Glendora, California, U.S.
- Listed height: 6 ft 6 in (1.98 m)
- Listed weight: 214 lb (97 kg)

Career information
- High school: Glendora (Glendora, California)
- College: Stanford (1999–2002)
- NBA draft: 2002: 1st round, 22nd overall pick
- Drafted by: Phoenix Suns
- Playing career: 2002–2014
- Position: Shooting guard / small forward
- Number: 10, 23, 32

Career history
- 2002–2005: Phoenix Suns
- 2005: New Orleans Hornets
- 2005–2006: TAU Cerámica
- 2006–2007: Brose Baskets
- 2007–2008: Memphis Grizzlies
- 2008–2009: Alba Berlin
- 2009–2014: Brose Baskets

Career highlights
- 5× Bundesliga champion (2007, 2010–2013); 3× German Cup winner (2010–2012); 4× German Supercup winner (2007, 2010–2012); 2× Bundesliga Finals MVP (2007, 2010); 3× All-Bundesliga Team (2007, 2011, 2012); Bundesliga Best Offensive Player (2007); No. 23 retired by Brose Baskets (2014); Consensus first-team All-American (2001); Consensus second-team All-American (2002); 3× First-team All-Pac-10 (2000–2002); Pac-10 co-Freshman of the Year (2000); McDonald's All-American (1999); Second-team Parade All-American (1999); California Mr. Basketball (1999)
- Stats at NBA.com
- Stats at Basketball Reference
Medals
Men's basketball
Representing United States
FIBA U19 World Cup
Silver medal – second place	1999 Lisbon	Team competition

Casey Gardner Jacobsen (born March 19, 1981) is an American retired professional basketball player who played four seasons in the National Basketball Association (NBA). He also had an extensive European basketball career, mostly while playing with Brose Baskets Bamberg, in Germany. With Brose, he won the Bundesliga championship in 2007 and 2010, while also receiving the German League Finals MVP award. He won Bundesliga championships in 2011, 2012, and 2013. He also won the German Cup with Bamberg, in 2010, 2011, and 2012, and the German Supercup four times (2007, 2010, 2011, 2012). Following his retirement in 2014, Brose Baskets retired his jersey number 23.

== High school ==
Jacobsen attended Glendora High School, in Glendora, California, where he played high school basketball. He was a McDonald's All-American selection.

== College career ==
After high school, Jacobsen played NCAA Division I college basketball at Stanford University, where he scored a career-high of 49 points against Arizona State University, on January 31, 2002. He was a First Team All-American his sophomore year, and a Second Team All-American his junior year. Jacobsen was also a three-time All-Pac-10 selection. In his three years in college with Stanford, he finished third in points scored (1,723), sixth in points per game (18.1), second in three-point goals (222), and fourth in three-point percentage (.427) in the school's history.

== Professional career ==
After his career at Stanford University, Jacobsen was the 22nd overall pick in the 2002 NBA draft, selected by the Phoenix Suns. He was later traded to the New Orleans Hornets in exchange for Jim Jackson. Jacobsen averaged 5.2 points per game through his career and is known as a player with exceptional range on his shot, out to beyond the NBA three-point line. His usual positions are shooting guard and small forward.

After playing for TAU Vitoria of the Spanish ACB League during the 2005–06 season, he signed a non-guaranteed contract with the Houston Rockets, and played in four preseason games with them, but was released on October 27, 2006, before the 2006–07 season began. Jacobsen then moved to the Brose Baskets (Bamberg, Germany) of the German League, where he won the German Basketball Championship in 2007, and he also earned the Finals MVP Award.

Jacobsen returned to the NBA when he was signed by the Memphis Grizzlies on July 24, 2007, and he spent the 2007–08 season with them.

On July 1, 2008, the Grizzlies chose not to offer Jacobsen a new contract, making him an unrestricted free agent. Jacobsen's final NBA game was on April 16, 2008, in a 111–120 loss to the Denver Nuggets where he recorded 8 points, 7 assists and 5 rebounds.

In August 2008, he signed with the German League club ALBA Berlin.

In June 2009 Jacobsen signed a new contract with his former team Brose Baskets Bamberg in Germany. He led his team to win both the German Cup (Pokalsieger) and German Championship in 2010 and was again named Finals MVP.

Jacobsen re-signed with Brose Baskets Bamberg in August 2010 for the 2010–2011 season. The team again won the German Cup in April 2011. At game five of the finals he announced that he extended his contract for three more years. During this time, he won the German Championships in the years 2012 and 2013 and also the German Cup in 2012. In May 2014, Jacobsen, along with his longtime teammate John Goldsberry, announced retirement from professional basketball. In tribute to him, Brose Baskets retired his 23 jersey number.

== Post-playing career ==
After retiring from playing basketball, it was announced by the Phoenix Suns that Jacobsen would not only be a broadcaster during some pre-game and post-game shows with Tom Chambers, but he would also hold his own show under the Rise Suns Digital Network. He would make his debut as a broadcaster on the November 2014 game against the Sacramento Kings. In addition, Jacobsen would also take on the college basketball analyst role for Fox Sports and the Pac-12 Networks.

== NBA career statistics ==
Legend
GP	Games played	GS	Games started	MPG	Minutes per game
FG%	Field goal percentage	3P%	3-point field goal percentage	FT%	Free throw percentage
RPG	Rebounds per game	APG	Assists per game	SPG	Steals per game
BPG	Blocks per game	PPG	Points per game	**Bold**	Career high
*	Led the league

=== Regular season ===
Year	Team	GP	GS	MPG	FG%	3P%	FT%	RPG	APG	SPG	BPG	PPG
2002–03	Phoenix	72	0	15.9	.373	.315	.686	1.2	1.0	.5	.1	5.1
2003–04	Phoenix	78	**13**	**23.4**	**.417**	**.417**	**.820**	**2.6**	1.3	**.6**	.1	6.0
2004–05	Phoenix	**40***	0	19.2	.414	.382	.774	1.7	.9	.3	.0	5.3
2004–05	New Orleans	**44***	1	**23.4**	.398	.364	.792	2.3	**1.7**	.5	**.2**	**7.6**
2007–08	Memphis	53	0	10.3	.339	.222	.765	1.2	.4	.1	.0	2.0
Career		287	14	18.5	.393	.352	.769	1.8	1.1	.4	.1	5.2

=== Playoffs ===
Year	Team	GP	GS	MPG	FG%	3P%	FT%	RPG	APG	SPG	BPG	PPG
2002–03	Phoenix	6	0	6.5	.200	.400	.000	.5	.3	.5	.0	1.0
Career		6	0	6.5	.200	.400	.000	.5	.3	.5	.0	1.0
