= SSV Hagen =

SSV Hagen, in full Sport- und Spielverein Hagen may refer to:

- SSV Hagen, a German basketball team from 1905 to 1990 that in 1990 merged into the professional team Brandt Hagen
- SSV Hagen, a German multi-sports club including football, jiu jitsu, cycling, weightlifting and jazzdance
