= Basketball Bundesliga awards =

- Awarded for: Individual awards that are given by the top-tier men's professional club basketball league in Germany
- Sponsored by: Basketball Bundesliga
- Country: Germany

The Basketball Bundesliga awards are the annual individual awards that are given by the top-tier level men's professional club basketball league in Germany, the Basketball Bundesliga.

== See also ==
- German Basketball League
- German Basketball League Champions
- German Basketball Cup
- German Basketball Supercup
- German League All-Star Game
