= Falke Nürnberg =

Falke Nürnberg was a professional basketball club that was based in Nuremberg, Germany. The club was also known as Dimplex Falke Nürnberg for sponsorship reasons, and was previously known as Baskets Nürnberg, or Sellbytel Baskets Nürnberg, for sponsorship reasons. With a budget of only €900,000, the club had the lowest budget in the German League, when it competed in the league. The club was at one time also the farm team of the German League club Brose Baskets.

== History ==
It was founded in 1922. Under the name of Baskets Nürnberg, the club played in the German top-tier level Basketball Bundesliga, in the 2005–06 and 2006–07 seasons. The club was then relegated from the top German division, and spent the 2007–08 season in the German 2nd Division, operating as the farm team of the German top-tier level club Brose Baskets, and under the name of Falke Nürnberg. The club was then dissolved before the 2008–09 season, after the Nürnberg Falcons took over the club's rights and licensing.

== Arena ==
The club's home arena was the Arena Nürnberger Versicherung of a 8,200 capacity for basketball games. It was used from the 2001-02 season and onwards.
