= John Ecker =

German-American basketball player and coach

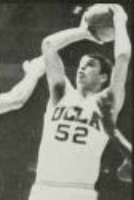
- Ecker with the Bruins during 1970–71 season

Personal information
- Born: October 12, 1948 (age 78)
- Listed height: 6 ft 6 in (1.98 m)

Career information
- High school: University (Los Angeles, California)
- College: UCLA (1968–1971)
- NBA draft: 1971: undrafted
- Playing career: 1971–1983
- Position: Forward
- Coaching career: 1992–1995

Career history

Playing
- 1971–1983: TuS 04 Leverkusen

Coaching
- 1992–1993: BG Bonn 92
- 1994–1995: Bonn

Career highlights
- As player: Basketball Bundesliga Top Scorer (1973); 3× NCAA champion (1969–1971)

John Miles Ecker (born October 12, 1948) is a German-American former basketball player and coach. He played college basketball for the UCLA Bruins under Coach John Wooden, winning three straight national championships from 1969 through 1971. Ecker played and coached professionally in Germany, where he also became a naturalized citizen in 1977. He also taught at a high school in Germany.

Ecker is married to German Olympic gold-medal winner Heide Ecker-Rosendahl. Their son, Danny Ecker, became one of the top German pole vaulters.

== Early life ==
Playing basketball at University High in West Los Angeles, Ecker was named to the All-Western League Second Team in 1965. As a senior, he averaged 20.7 points per game and was named to the All-Los Angeles City First Team. He was also named to the All-Western League First Team along with fellow senior teammate Bill Seibert.

== College career ==
Ecker was not a marquee player for UCLA. Over three championship seasons, he played in nearly every game, though his playing time was limited and typically came when the outcome of the game was already decided. The skinny, 6-foot-6-inch (1.98 m) reserve served as a backup at both forward and center. He is one of 14 players who won three National Collegiate Athletic Association (NCAA) titles at UCLA under Coach John Wooden.

Ecker entered UCLA as a walk-on without an athletic scholarship, and was a starter on the freshman team in 1966–67. He was joined in the lineup by Seibert, his former high school teammate. The following season, Ecker redshirted and did not play. He made the 15-man varsity squad for 1968–69, and served as the team's third-string center.

On the first day of practice in 1969–70, students at UCLA had scheduled a walkout to protest the Vietnam War. Ecker joined teammate Andy Hill, who was also a former high school teammate, in requesting Wooden to cancel practice to support of the antiwar effort, but the coach refused. With the graduation of three-year starting center Lew Alcindor (known later as Kareem Abdul-Jabbar), Ecker was promoted to second-string as starter Steve Patterson's backup. During the season, Ecker made a 4-foot (1.2 m) layup with five seconds remaining for a 72–71 win over Oregon State. He had entered the game for a jump ball with 16 seconds left after Sidney Wicks had fouled out, and controlled the tip before making the winning shot. UCLA finished the season 28–2, and won the national championship game over Jacksonville. At the annual team banquet after the season, Seibert delivered a speech that was highly critical of Wooden. Afterwards, the coach was determined to eliminate "all possible sources of trouble" from the team. He interrogated Ecker, Hill, and Terry Schofield, advising them to transfer from UCLA if they agreed with Seibert, but all three players insisted that they wished to stay.

In 1970–71, Ecker made two free throws in the final seven seconds in a 57–53 win over Washington State. The team's top free throw shooter at 88 percent, he made the shots in place of an injured Schofield. The Bruins won their fifth straight national championship, and seven of the previous eight.

== Professional career ==
Ecker played in Germany for TuS 04 Leverkusen from 1971 though 1983. He briefly returned to the U.S. for 15 months starting in 1974, when he served as an assistant coach with UCLA. Ecker later coached in Germany as well.

From 1975 though 2010, he was also a high school teacher at Landrat-Lucas-Gymnasium in Opladen.

== Personal ==
Ecker met his wife, Heide Rosendahl, in 1971 on his third day in Leverkusen. Rosendahl won two gold medals in track and field in the 1972 Summer Olympics in Munich. They married in 1974 and have two sons: David and Danny, who became one of Germany's top pole vaulters.

Ecker became a German citizen in 1977.
