= Basketball Bundesliga GmbH =

Governing body for basketball in Germany

- Sport: Basketball
- Founded: 1996
- CEO: (Germany) Alexander Reil
- Country: Germany

The Basketball Bundesliga GmbH is a governing body for basketball in Germany. It directs the 18 professional German basketball sports clubs of the top-tier German Basketball League.

== History ==
The Basketball Bundesliga BBL was founded 29 October 1996, as a private league company, with league independence from the German Basketball Federation (DBB). In 1998, the BBL became the BBL GmbH, of which the AG BBL e.V., comprising the clubs of the German Basketball League, own a 74% controlling share, and the German Basketball Federation (DBB) with 26%.

== See also ==
- German Basketball League (BBL)
- German Basketball Federation (DBB)
