= Eintracht Frankfurt Basketball =

- Leagues: Oberliga
- Founded: 1954
- Location: Frankfurt am Main, Germany
- Website: Official website

Eintracht Frankfurt Basketball is a German professional sports club located in Frankfurt am Main. The club played three seasons in the Basketball Bundesliga. (1967–69, 1979/80)

It is the men's basketball department of Eintracht Frankfurt, a major multi-sport club.

There is a close cooperation between Eintracht Frankfurt and the nearby Skyliners Frankfurt. To be more competitive, the two clubs have merged their top youth teams.

== History ==
The club was founded in 1954. In 1966-67 they managed to win promotion to the National League for the following season staying for 2 years. In 1978-79 they won the 2. Basketball Bundesliga and returned to the top flight of German basketball.

== Honours ==
German Second division

- Champions (1): 1979

== Notable players ==
To appear in this section a player must have either:

- Set a club record or won an individual award as a professional player.
- Played at least one official international match for his senior national team at any time.

- (Germany) Alex King
- (Guyana) Antric Klaiber
- (United States) Brian Myers
