= Bayer Giants Leverkusen =

Professional basketball team in Leverkusen, Germany

- Leagues: ProB
- Founded: 1961; 65 years ago
- History: TuS Bayer 04 Leverkusen 1961–1983; TSV Bayer 04 Leverkusen 1983–2000; Bayer Giants Leverkusen; 2000–present
- Arena: Ostermann-Arena
- Capacity: 3,500
- Location: Leverkusen, North Rhine-Westphalia
- Head coach: Michael Koch
- Team captain: Dennis Heinzmann
- Championships: 14 German Championships; 10 German Cup; 3 ProB
- Website: www.bayer-basketball.de
Home	Away

Bayer Giants Leverkusen is a professional basketball club, part of the TSV Bayer 04 Leverkusen sports club based in Leverkusen, Germany. It currently plays in ProA, the second division of German basketball.

Based on the number of titles, Bayer Leverkusen is the most successful team in the history of German Basketball with a record-14 championships and 10 Cups. In 2009, the Bayer company cut down sponsorship and the club went down to Germany's ProB (third division) to restructure. The license for the Basketball Bundesliga was transferred to the newly formed Giants Düsseldorf.

The team is currently coached by two of its legends: Hansi Gnad and Michael Koch.

== History ==
Founded as TuS Bayer 04 Leverkusen in 1961, the club moved up to first division Basketball Bundesliga in 1968. The club won 5 national championships and 4 German Cups as TuS 04 Leverkusen before it changed its name and continued its dominance as TSV Bayer 04 Leverkusen. Until today, the club has won more national titles than any other German basketball team.

The first success came in 1970 when TuS 04 won the double under coach Günter Hagedorn with more Trophies and participations in European competitions following during the 1970s. From 1970 until 1977 the club played in 5 Cup Finals winning four titles. In 1985 and 1986 Bayer won the German Championship again before establishing itself as a powerhouse in the 1990s with constant presence in the FIBA Euroleague after winning 7 championships in a row (1990–96) with coach Dirk Bauermann.

After the team lost three of its key players on a free transfer in the summer of 1996 (Michael Koch, Chris Welp and Henning Harnisch) Alba Berlin was the team that broke Bayer's dominance with the last success being the 2nd place in the league in 2000. The last participation in Europe's top competition was in the 2000-01 season when the club as German's runners-up played in the Suproleague.

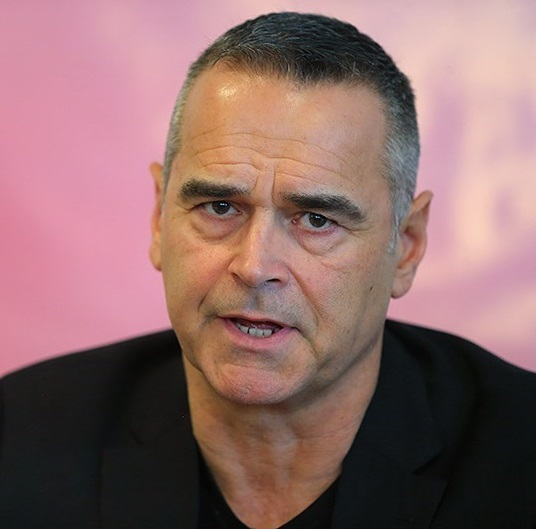
Dirk Bauermann guided Bayer to 7 straight titles.

To the disdain of all of its supporters, in 2008 the Bayer company decided to make dramatic cuts in its sponsorship for the team and simply focus on its football operations and amateur athletics. This move forced the club's basketball team to cede its Basketball Bundesliga license to the newly formed Giants Düsseldorf and move down to Germany's 4th Division Regionalliga to restructure. Thousands of club supporters gathered in the streets of Leverkusen to protest the company's move. Giants won the Regionalliga and promotion to the ProB in their first season.

In 2013, the club promoted to the ProA League, but it was relegated to the ProB two years later. In 2019 Bayer returned to the ProA, German basketball's second tier, but relegated in 2023. In the 2024/25 season, the Giants lost only one of their 34 games. The club ultimately won the ProB championship against the SBB Baskets. They subsequently moved up to the ProA.

== Season by season ==
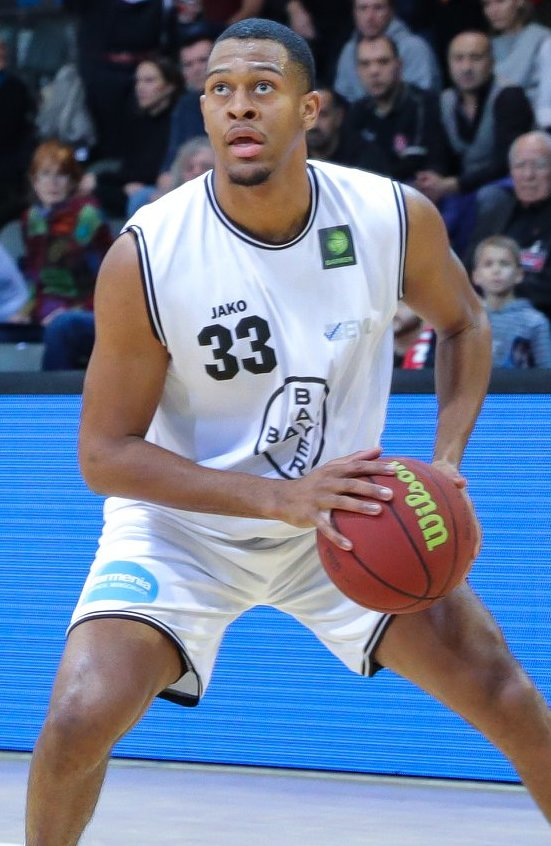
Nick Hornsby

Season	Tier	League	Pos.	German Cup	European competitions	
1989–90	1	Bundesliga	1st	Champion	2 Cup Winners' Cup	R16
1990–91	1	Bundesliga	1st	Champion	1 Champions Cup	QF
1991–92	1	Bundesliga	1st		1 Euroleague	GS
1992–93	1	Bundesliga	1st	Champion	1 Euroleague	GS
1993–94	1	Bundesliga	1st	Semifinalist	1 Euroleague	GS
1994–95	1	Bundesliga	1st	Champion	1 Euroleague	GS
1995–96	1	Bundesliga	1st	Runner-up	1 Euroleague	GS
1996–97	1	Bundesliga	4th		1 Euroleague	GS
1997–98	1	Bundesliga	8th		2 EuroCup	R32
1998–99	1	Bundesliga	4th		3 Korać Cup	GS
1999–00	1	Bundesliga	2nd		3 Korać Cup	GS
2000–01	1	Bundesliga	3rd	Third position	1 SuproLeague	RS
2001–02	1	Bundesliga	5th		3 Korać Cup	R16
2002–03	1	Bundesliga	8th		4 Regional Challenge Cup North	RU
2003–04	1	Bundesliga	8th			
2004–05	1	Bundesliga	13th			
2005–06	1	Bundesliga	10th			
2006–07	1	Bundesliga	8th			
2007–08	1	Bundesliga	6th (Note: Sold its place to Giants Düsseldorf.)			
2008–09	4	1st Regionalliga	1st			
2009–10	3	ProB	7th			
2010–11	3	ProB	8th			
2011–12	3	ProB	11th			
2012–13	3	ProB	5th			
2013–14	2	ProA	13th			
2014–15	2	ProA	14th			
2015–16	2	ProA	15th			
2016–17	3	ProB	4th			
2017–18	3	ProB	8th			
2018–19	3	ProB	1st			
2019–20	2	ProA	5th			
2020–21	2	ProA	5th			
2021–22	2	ProA	5th			
2022–23	2	ProA	17th			
2023–24	3	ProB	2nd			
2024–25	3	ProB	1st			
2025–26	2	ProA	17th			

== Honours ==
- German Champions
  - Winners (14-record): 1970, 1971, 1972, 1976, 1979, 1985, 1986, 1990, 1991, 1992, 1993, 1994, 1995, 1996
  - Runners-up (6): 1977, 1980, 1987, 1988, 1989, 2000
- German Cup:
  - Winners (10): 1970, 1971, 1974, 1976, 1986, 1987, 1990, 1991, 1993, 1995
  - Runners-up (2): 1977, 1989
- ProA
  - Runners-up (1): 2021
- ProB
  - Winners (3-record): 2013, 2019, 2025
- 1. Regionalliga
  - Winners (1): 2009

== European participations ==
The club has competed for 21 seasons in European competitions organized by FIBA Europe from 1970 until 2003.

- FIBA Euroleague/Suproleague : 11 times (1970–71, 1971–72, 1972–73, 1990–91, 1991–92, 1992–93, 1993–94, 1994–95, 1995–96, 1996–97, 2000–01)
- Cup Winners' Cup: 4 times (1974–75, 1987–88, 1989–90, 1997–98)
- Korac Cup: 5 times (1975–76, 1988–89, 1998–99, 1999–00, 2001–02)
- FIBA Regional Conference: 1 time (2002–03)

== Games against NBA teams ==
9 September 1984

Bayer 04 Leverkusen (West Germany)	86–109	(United States) Seattle SuperSonics

Wilhelm-Dopatka-Halle, Leverkusen

== Players ==
=== Current roster ===
Note: Flags indicate national team eligibility at FIBA-sanctioned events. Players may hold other non-FIBA nationalities not displayed.

Bayer Giants Leverkusen roster
Players
Coaches

Pos.	No.	Nat.	Name	Ht.	Wt.	Age
PF	1	(United States) (Germany)	Oldham, C.J.	2.02 m (6 ft 8 in)		35 – 26 February 1991
PG	3	(Germany)	Kahl, Luca Finn	1.91 m (6 ft 3 in)		29 – 1 June 1997
PG	8	(United States)	Langley, Kobe	1.84 m (6 ft 0 in)		25 – 31 December 2000
G	10	(Germany)	Brach, Sebastian	1.90 m (6 ft 3 in)		24 – 22 February 2002
F	11	(United States)	Lynch, Ricardo	2.01 m (6 ft 7 in)		27 – 9 November 1998
G/F	15	(United States)	Nicholas, Donte	1.96 m (6 ft 5 in)		39 – 13 March 1987
G	21	(United States)	Williams, John	1.93 m (6 ft 4 in)		27 – 21 February 1999
C	22	(Germany)	Heinzmann, Dennis (C)	2.16 m (7 ft 1 in)		35 – 22 January 1991
PG	24	(Romania) (Germany)	Nita, Calin	1.88 m (6 ft 2 in)		21 – 10 February 2005
C	51	(Germany)	Urbansky, Sören-Eyke	2.14 m (7 ft 0 in)		26 – 29 March 2000

Head coach

- (Germany) Michael Koch

Assistant coach(es)

- (Germany) Hansi Gnad
- (Germany) Mauriz Golka

Legend

- (C) Team captain
- Injured

- Roster
Updated: October 20, 2025

=== Notable players ===
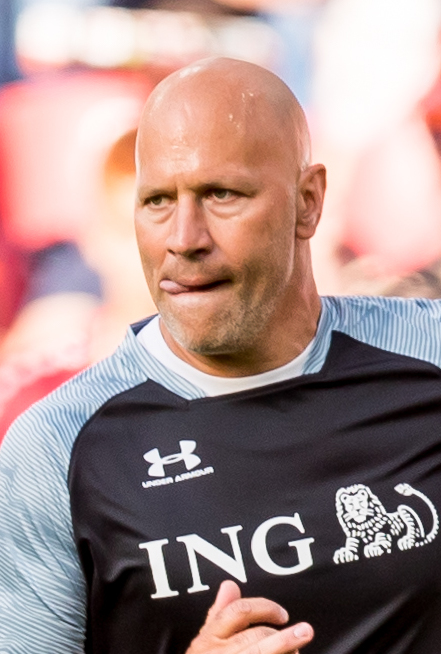
Denis Wucherer

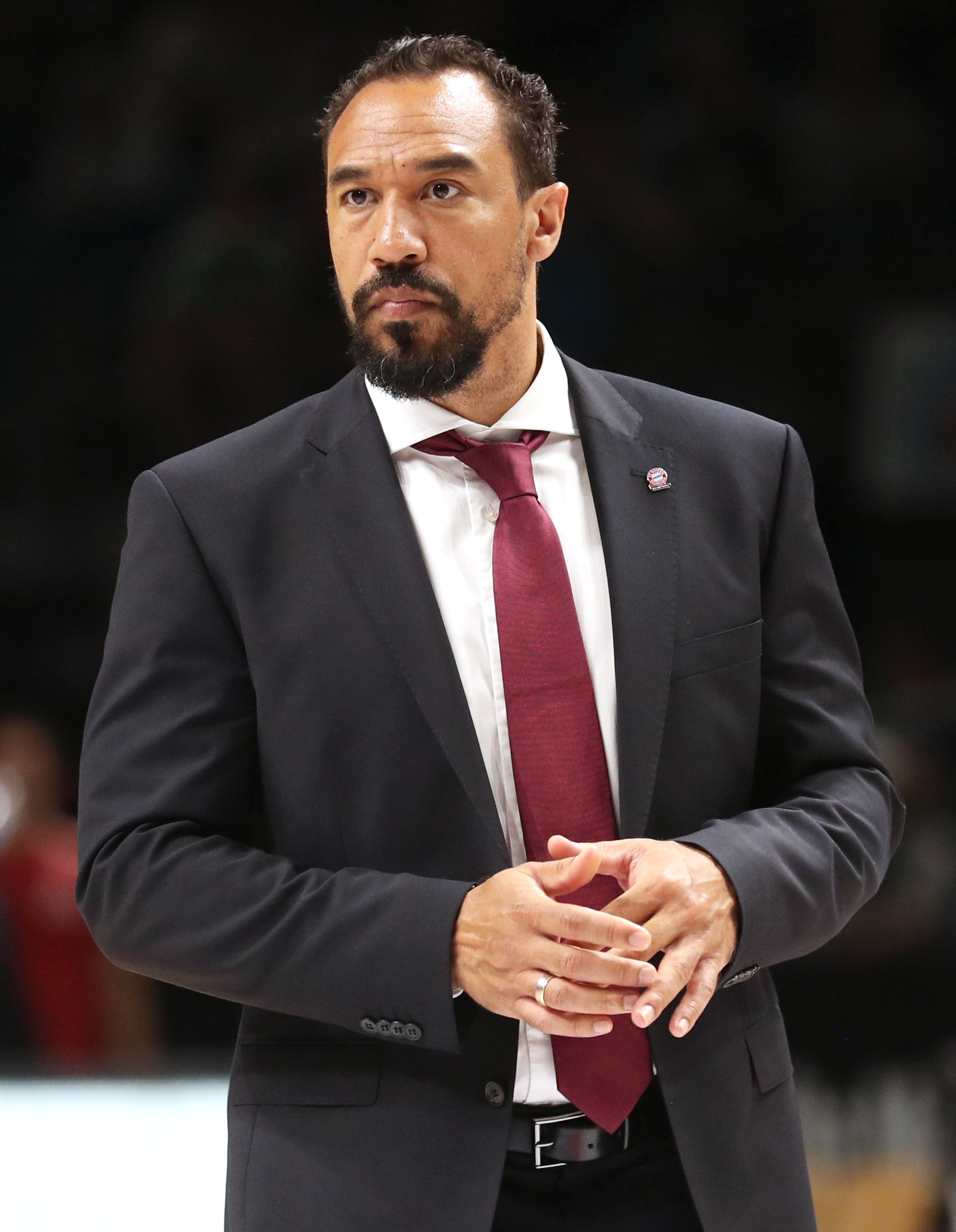
Demond Greene

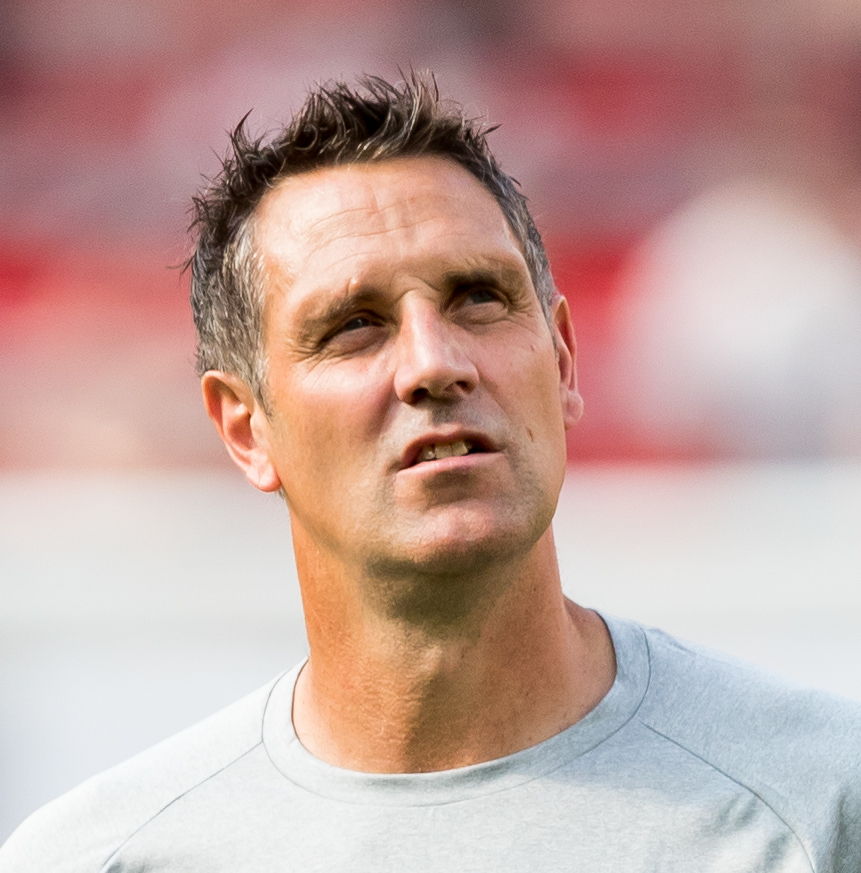
Hansi Gnad

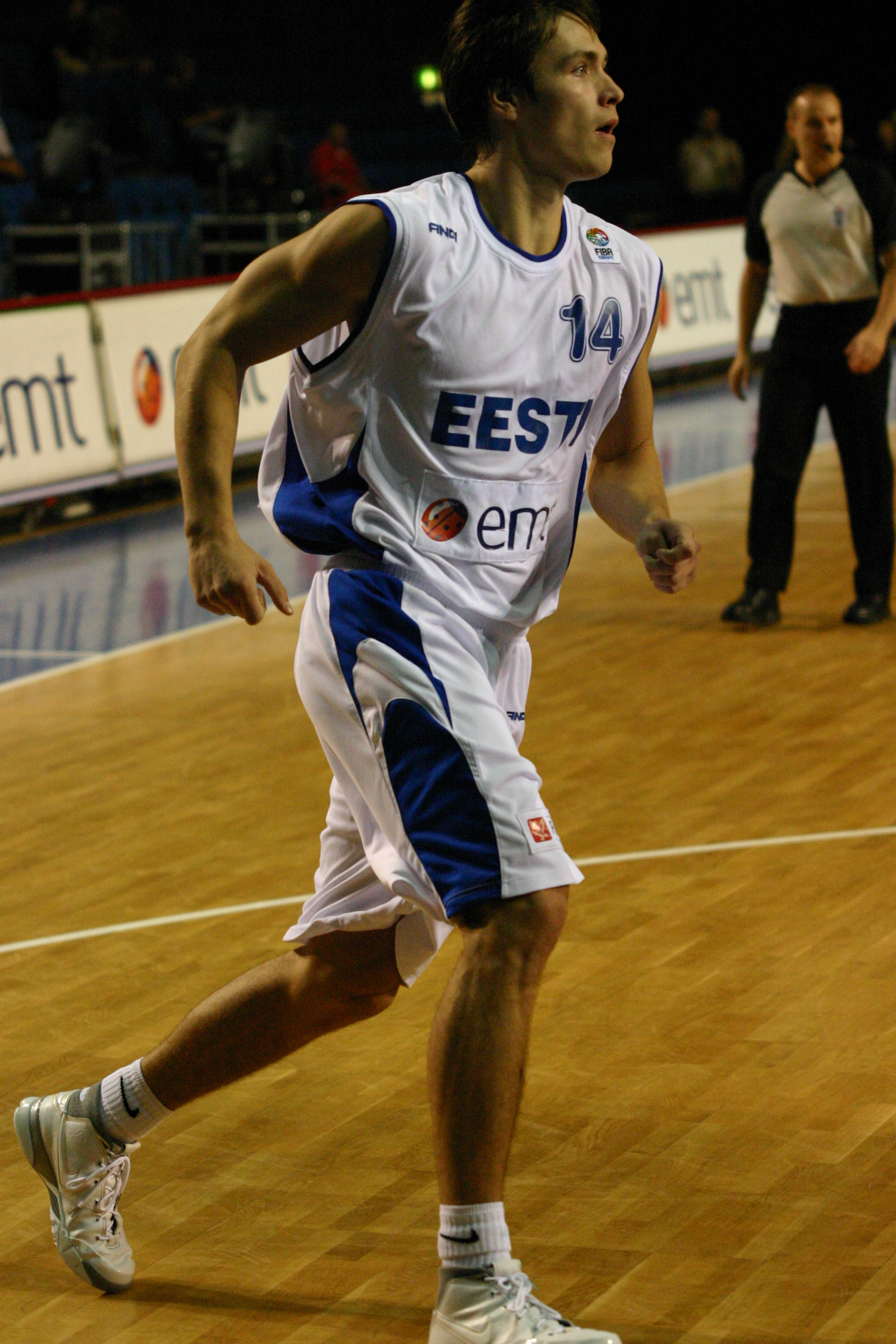
Kristjan Kangur

To appear in this section a player must have played at least two seasons for the club AND either:

– Set a club record or won an individual award as a professional player.
– Played at least one official international match for his senior national team at any time.

- (Germany) Stephan Baeck 4 seasons: '83–'85, '90–'92
- (Germany) Gunther Behnke 11 seasons: '81–'92
- (Germany) (United States) John Ecker 12 seasons: '71–'83
- (Germany) Hansi Gnad 4 seasons: '95–'97, '99–'01
- (Germany) Demond Greene 3 seasons: '02–'05
- (Germany) Henning Harnisch 8 seasons: '88–'96
- (Germany) Steven Hutchinson 3 seasons: '99–'02
- (Germany) Rudi Kleen 11 seasons: '70–'81
- (Germany) Moritz Kleine-Brockhoff 6 seasons: '88–'94
- (Germany) Michael Koch 5 seasons: '91–'96
- (Germany) Dieter Kuprella 9 seasons: '68–'77
- (Germany) Michael Pappert 4 seasons: '85–'89
- (Germany) Jochen Pollex 3 seasons: '69–'72
- (Germany) Sven Schultze 3 seasons: '02–'05
- (Germany) Norbert Thimm 10 seasons: '69–'72,'74–'81
- (Germany) Christian Welp 5 seasons: '91–'96
- (Germany) Denis Wucherer 9 seasons: '92–'98, '02–'05
- (Estonia) Kristjan Kangur 2 seasons: '04–'06
- (United States) John Best 3 seasons: '00–'03
- (United States) Tony Dawson 2 seasons: '95–'97
- (United States) Nate Fox 5 seasons: '02–'03, '05–'08
- (United States) Tom Garrick 2 seasons: '93–'95
- (United States) Nick Hornsby 2 seasons: '18–'20
- (United States) Kannard Johnson 4 seasons: '89–'93
- (United States) J. J. Mann 2 seasons: '20–'22
- (United States) Clinton Wheeler 4 seasons: '89–'93

== Head coaches ==
Coach	Start	End
(Greece) Pascal Chatziathanasiou	1965	1968
(Germany) Günter Hagedorn	1969	1973
(Germany) Bernd Röder	1975	1976
(Romania) Dragoş Nosievici	1977	1978
(United States) Chris Lee	1980	1984
(United States) Jim Kelly	1984	1989
(Germany) Dirk Bauermann	1989	1998
(United States) Calvin Oldham	1998	2002
(Germany) Heimo Förster	2002	2005
(Germany) Achim Kuczmann	2005	2008
(Germany) Stephan Ruers	2008	2010
(United States) Chris Martin	2010	2011
(Germany) Achim Kuczmann	2011	2018
(Germany) Hans-Jürgen Gnad	2018	2024
(Germany) Michael Koch	since 2024	

== See also ==
- TSV Bayer 04 Leverkusen (handball)
- Bayer 04 Leverkusen (football)
