= VfL Osnabrück (basketball) =

- Founded: 1957
- Dissolved: 1975
- History: VfL Osnabrück (1957-1975)
- Arena: Schlosswallhalle
- Capacity: 2200
- Location: Osnabrück, Lower Saxony, Germany
- Championships: 1 German Championship; 1 German Cup

VfL Osnabrück Basketball was the basketball department of the multi-sports club VfL Osnabrück based in Osnabrück, Lower Saxony, Germany.

== History ==
The basketball department was founded in 1957. In the 1965/66 season, the team qualified for the newly formed Basketball Bundesliga (two groups then) as winners of the Oberliga Nord and was one of the 20 founding teams in the first BBL season in 1966/67. In the first Bundesliga season, VfL finished runner-up and winner of the new DBB Cup. In 1967/68, VfL reached the round of "16" in the Cup Winners Cup. Followed by another runner-up finish in the 1967/68 season, VfL achieved its first and only German championship title in the 1968/69 season.

== Honours ==
- Basketball Bundesliga
  - Champions (1): 1968–69
    - Runners-up (4): 1964-65, 1966–67, 1967–68, 1965-66 (Oberliga North)
- German Cup
  - Champions (1): 1967
    - Runners-up (2): 1969, 1970
