= MTV Wolfenbüttel (basketball) =

MTV Herzöge Wolfenbüttel
- Leagues: ProB
- Founded: 1956; 69 years ago
- History: MTV Wolfenbüttel; 1956–2002; Wolfenbüttel Dukes; 2002–08; Herzöge Wolfenbüttel; 2008–12; MTV Herzöge Wolfenbüttel; 2012–present
- Arena: Lindenhalle
- Location: Wolfenbüttel, Germany
- Head coach: Demetrius Ward
- Championships: 2 German Cups
- Website: herzoege-wolfenbuettel.de
Home	Away

MTV Wolfenbüttel was a basketball club based in Wolfenbüttel, Germany. The basketball club established in 1956 within the multi-sports club MTV Wolfenbüttel (Männerturnverein Wolfenbüttel / in English: Men's gymnastics club Wolfenbüttel). In 2002, the club's license was transferred to Wolfenbüttel Dukes, and, in July 2008 to today's club as Herzöge Wolfenbüttel. In 2012 Herzöge Wolfenbüttel merged with MTV Wolfenbüttel again.

In 2015, MTV Herzöge Wolfenbüttel entered into a cooperation with SG Braunschweig. Starting with the 2015–16 ProB season, both clubs will field a joined team which will play in Wolfenbüttel and serve as a farm team to Basketball Bundesliga club Basketball Löwen Braunschweig.

== Honours ==
German Cup

- Winners (2): 1971–72, 1981–82
- Runners-up (3): 1967-68, 1972-73, 1975-76

== Notable coaches ==
- (Romania) Mihai Albu
