= BBV Hagen =

- Nickname: Die Zwiebäcke (The zwiebacks, former nickname)
- Leagues: Regionalliga
- Founded: 1905
- History: SSV Hagen (1905-1990); Brandt Hagen (1990-1998, 1999-2003); SSV GoldStar Hagen (1998-1999); SSV GoldStar Hagen (2003-Present)
- Arena: Ischelandhalle (capacity: 1,800)
- Location: Hagen, Germany
- Team colors: White and Red
- Championships: German Champion: 1974; 2x German Cup Champion: 1975, 1994
Home	Away

Brandt Hagen Hagen is a professional basketball club from Hagen in Germany.

== History ==
It is the successor of Brandt Hagen, a professional club that had considerable success in the German Basketball Bundesliga in the 90s. In April 1990, the club was formed by merging the basketball teams of SSV Goldstar Hagen and TSV Hagen 1860. The two clubs were among the founding members of the Basketball Bundesliga (BBL), the top league of German basketball. Also, at the time of merger, both teams played in the BBL.

The name "Brandt Hagen", for the new club, originated from the main sponsor Brandt Zwieback, a well known producer of zwieback in Germany. The company has its roots in Hagen. Starting with the season 1990-91, Brandt Hagen was a member of the Basketball Bundesliga, continuously until 2004.

In 1994, the German Cup was won. Until 2003, the club played in the gym Ischelandhalle in Hagen. Then the arena capacity of 1,800 was no longer sufficient for the BBL. In the 2003-04 season, Brandt Hagen opted to play in the bigger Helmut-Körnig-Halle in Dortmund. Plans for a bigger arena in Hagen were drawn. However, the arena in Dortmund caused problems: the costs for the rent were higher, and smaller audiences attended the matches than in Hagen. At the same time, main sponsor Brandt, reduced its financial support.

The club applied for insolvency in December 2003, with a financial deficit of DM400,000, which could not be sorted out, and lead to the termination of all club operations.

Shortly afterwards, the newly formed, BBV Hagen, took over Brandt Hagen's heritage. Relegated to the Regionalliga (3rd division in 2004, 4th division since 2007) to restructure, BBV Hagen has since tried to return to the former glory of its predecessors, SSV Hagen and Brandt Hagen. Since 2009, a different team from Hagen, the Phoenix Hagen, is playing in the Basketball Bundesliga.

== Honours ==
- Basketball Bundesliga
  - Winners: 74
- BBL-Pokal
  - Winners: 75, 94
  - Runners-up : 72, 78, 81, 83
- 2. Basketball Bundesliga
  - Champions (1): 1985

== Notable players ==
- (Germany) Ingo Freyer
- (Germany) Uwe Sauer
- (United States) Keith Gatlin
- (Germany) Hansi Gnad
