= ASC 1846 Göttingen =

Logo

Former logo

The ASC 1846 Göttingen is a German sports club based in Göttingen. It was founded on 3 August 1846 and is best known for its basketball section having won 3 national titles and 2 Cups and played against Seattle SuperSonics twice in the 1980s. The club currently has basketball and volleyball departments.

== Basketball ==
ASC and its predecessor societies SSV Hellas Göttingen and SSC Göttingen played 16 times in the Federal basketball league (1966–67, 1970–71, 1973–75 and 1976–88). The club became three times German champion and twice in a row German Cup winner while it won the double in 1984.

The men's team of ASC Göttingen are currently playing in 1 Regionalliga Nord. Venue is the gym of the Georg-Christoph-Lichtenberg Comprehensive School; Main training venue is the sports hall of the Mountain Grove High School, where most of the other league matches will be played.

=== Titles and achievements ===
German League

- Winners (3): 1979–80, 1982–83, 1983–84

German Cup

- Winners (2): 1983–84, 1984–85
- Runners-up (1): 1978-79

=== Games against NBA teams ===
25 August 1984

Seattle SuperSonics (United States)	119–95	(West Germany) ASC 1846 Göttingen

(West Germany) Georg-Sehring-Halle, Langen

5 September 1984

Seattle SuperSonics (United States)	106–76	(West Germany) ASC 1846 Göttingen

(West Germany) Georg-Sehring-Halle, Langen
