= BBL-Pokal =

German basketball tournament

- Founded: 1966; 60 years ago
- First season: 1966–67
- Country: Germany
- Number of teams: 16
- Related competitions: Basketball Bundesliga
- Current champions: Bamberg Baskets (7th title) (2025–26)
- Most championships: Alba Berlin (11 titles)
- Website: www.easycredit-bbl.de
- 2026–27 BBL-Pokal

Netto Basketball Bundesliga-Pokal, commonly known as the BBL-Pokal, is the annual national basketball cup competition in Germany. From 2009 until 2022, the competition has been conducted only between the top-ranked clubs of each Basketball Bundesliga (BBL) season. Beginning with the 2023/24 season also the best clubs of the second-tier league ProA take part in the competition.

== History and format ==
Former BBL-Pokal Top Four logo

The competition was founded in 1966 by the German Basketball Federation. The first final of the German Basketball Cup took place on 11 June 1967, in Oberhausen. Since 1993, the cup championship is decided in a final four format, which is held over one weekend. The host team of the cup's final four, is automatically set as one of the participants. The three remaining teams are determined by three quarterfinal matches, played between the winners of the earlier round matches.

Logo of the Top Four of the BBL-Pokal, used until 2018

Starting from the 2018–19 season, the format was changed to a sixteen team knock-out tournament, with the sixteen highest seeded teams from the previous season qualifying.

== Winners ==
- 1966–67 Vfl Osnabrück (1)
- 1967–68 Bayern Munich (1)
- 1968–69 Gießen 46ers (1)
- 1969–70 TuS 04 Leverkusen (1)
- 1970–71 TuS 04 Leverkusen (2)
- 1971–72 Wolfenbüttel (1)
- 1972–73 Gießen 46ers (2)
- 1973–74 TuS 04 Leverkusen (3)
- 1974–75 SSV Hagen (1)
- 1975–76 TuS 04 Leverkusen (4)
- 1976–77 USC Heidelberg (1)
- 1977–78 USC Heidelberg (2)
- 1978–79 Gießen 46ers (3)
- 1979–80 Saturn Köln (1)
- 1980–81 Saturn Köln (2)
- 1981–82 Wolfenbüttel (2)
- 1982–83 Saturn Köln (3)
- 1983–84 ASC 1846 Göttingen (1)
- 1984–85 ASC 1846 Göttingen (2)
- 1985–86 Bayer 04 Leverkusen (5)
- 1986–87 Bayer 04 Leverkusen (6)
- 1987–88 Steiner Bảyeuth (1)
- 1988–89 Steiner Bảyeuth (2)
- 1989–90 Bayer 04 Leverkusen (7)
- 1990–91 Bayer 04 Leverkusen (8)
- 1991–92 TTL Bamberg (1)
- 1992–93 Bayer 04 Leverkusen (9)
- 1993–94 Brandt Hagen (2)
- 1994–95 Bayer 04 Leverkusen (10)
- 1995–96 ratiopharm Ulm
- 1996–97 Alba Berlin (1)
- 1997–98 TBB Trier (1)
- 1998–99 Alba Berlin (2)
- 1999–00 Skyliners Frankfurt (1)
- 2000–01 TBB Trier (2)
- 2001–02 Alba Berlin (3)
- 2002–03 Alba Berlin (4)
- 2003–04 RheinEnergie Köln (1)
- 2004–05 RheinEnergie Köln (2)
- 2005–06 Alba Berlin (5)
- 2006–07 RheinEnergie Köln (3)
- 2007–08 Artland Dragons (1)
- 2008–09 Alba Berlin (6)
- 2009–10 Brose Baskets (2)
- 2010–11 Brose Baskets (3)
- 2011–12 Brose Baskets (4)
- 2012–13 Alba Berlin (7)
- 2013–14 Alba Berlin (8)
- 2014–15 EWE Baskets Oldenburg
- 2015–16 Alba Berlin (9)
- 2016–17 Brose Bamberg (5)
- 2017–18 Bayern Munich (2)
- 2018–19 Brose Bamberg (6)
- 2019–20 Alba Berlin (10)
- 2020–21 Bayern Munich (3)
- 2021–22 Alba Berlin (11)
- 2022–23 Bayern Munich (4)
- 2023–24 Bayern Munich (5)
- 2024–25 Mitteldeutscher BC
- 2025–26 Bamberg Baskets (7)

== Finals ==
=== Single and two-legged Finals Era (1967–1992) ===
The first DBB Cup final took place on 11 June 1967 in Oberhausen between VfL Osnabrück and ATV 1877 Düsseldorf 86:74 (HT 39:36).

- 1966–67, 11.06.67, Oberhausen: Osnabrück – ATV 1877 Düsseldorf 86–74
- 1967–68, 09.06.68, Darmstadt: Bayern Munich – Wolfenbüttel 59–55
- 1968–69, 14.06.69, Hamburg: Giessen 46ers – Osnabrück 75–74
- 1969–70, 31.05.70 Braunschweig: Bayer Giants Leverkusen – Osnabrück 73–49
- 1970–71, 17.10.71 Bamberg: Bayer Leverkusen – USC Mainz 101–64
- 1971–72, 07.05.72, Hilden: MTV Wolfenbüttel – Hagen 72–65
- 1972–73, 08.06.73 Hagen: Giessen 46ers – MTV Wolfenbüttel 90–86
- 1973–74, 08.06.74 Hagen: Bayer Leverkusen – Hamburger 88–61
- 1974–75, 15/22.03.75 Hagen & Heidelberg: SSV Hagen – USC Heidelberg 79:58 & 56:66
- 1975–76, 03/11.04.76 Leverkusen & Wolfenbüttel: TuS 04 Leverkusen – MTV Wolfenbüttel 84:77 & 62:66
- 1976–77, 30.03 /06.04.77 Heidelberg & Leverkusen: USC Heidelberg – Bayer Leverkusen 88:70 & 72:87
- 1977–78, 09/17.05.78 Heidelberg & Hagen: USC Heidelberg – SV Hagen 78:69 & 82:90
- 1978–79, 21/28.03.79 Göttingen & Gießen: Giessen 46ers – ASC 1846 Göttingen 77–72 & 75–77.
- 1979–80, 26/29.03.80 Köln + Gießen: Saturn Köln – Giessen 46ers 78–62 & 68–70
- 1980–81, 01/11.02.81 Hagen & Köln: Saturn Köln – SVV Hagen 82:77 & 85:82
- 1981–82,16/24.03.82 Wolfenbüttel & Köln: Wolfenbüttel – Saturn Köln 97:79 & 76:93
- 1982–83, 19/27.03.83 Hagen & Köln: Saturn Köln – Hagen 78:66 & 92:85
- 1983–84, 04/07.03.84 Köln & Göttingen: ASC 46 Göttingen – Saturn Köln 75:76 & 83:65
- 1984–85, 10.03.85 Osnabrück: ASC 1846 Göttingen – Medi Bayreuth (div2) 85–72
- 1985–86, 22.03.86 Bamberg: Bayer Leverkusen – Medi Bayreuth 80–68
- 1986–87, 05.04.87 Leverkusen: TSV Bayer 04 Leverkusen – Giessen 46ers 92:71
- 1987–88, 07.05.88 Ludwigsburg: Medi Bayreuth – Saturn Köln 105–88
- 1988–89, 1989, 02.04.89 Leverkusen: Medi Bayreuth – Bayer Giants Leverkusen 89–67
- 1989–90, 14/16.04.90 Bamberg & Leverkusen:TSV Bayer 04 Leverkusen – Brose Bamberg 84:83 & 99:78
- 1990–91, 17/23.03.91 Braunschweig & Leverkusen: TSV Bayer 04 Leverkusen – MTV Braunschweig 98:71 & 126:80 (OT)
- 1991–92, 06/08.03.92 Stuttgart & Bamberg: Brose Bamberg – Riesen Ludwigsburg 69–72 & 74–68

=== Top Four Era (1993–2019, 2021–present) ===
From 1993 to 2019, a final four tournament was held in a host city to determine the winner of the BBL-Pokal.

Former logo of the Top Four

Year	Host city	Champion	Runner-up	Score	MVP
1993	Bayreuth	Bayer 04 Leverkusen	Brandt Hagen	81–60	Not awarded
1994	Bamberg	Brandt Hagen	ratiopharm Ulm	86–72	Not awarded
1995	Würzburg	Bayer 04 Leverkusen	ratiopharm Ulm	77–76	Not awarded
1996	Berlin	ratiopharm Ulm	Bayer 04 Leverkusen	80–79	Not awarded
1997	Gießen	Alba Berlin	Gießen 46ers	82–73	Not awarded
1998	Frankfurt	TBB Trier	Dragons Rhöndorf	97–88	Not awarded
1999	Frankfurt	Alba Berlin	Gießen 46ers	69–48	Not awarded
2000	Frankfurt	Skyliners Frankfurt	Alba Berlin	76–68	Not awarded
2001	Frankfurt	TBB Trier	Hagen	96–83	Not awarded
2002	Berlin	Alba Berlin	EWE Baskets Oldenburg	105–55	Not awarded
2003	Berlin	Alba Berlin	RheinEnergie Köln	82–80	Not awarded
2004	Frankfurt	RheinEnergie Köln	Opel Skyliners	80–71	Not awarded
2005	Frankfurt	RheinEnergie Köln	Telekom Baskets Bonn	85–75	Not awarded
2006	Bamberg	Alba Berlin	GHP Bamberg	85–73	Not awarded
2007	Hamburg	RheinEnergie Köln	Artland Dragons	60–58	Not awarded
2008	Hamburg	Artland Dragons	EnBW Ludwigsburg	74–60	Not awarded
2009	Hamburg	Alba Berlin	Telekom Baskets Bonn	69–44	Not awarded
2010	Frankfurt	Brose Baskets	Deutsche Bank Skyliners	76–75	Not awarded
2011	Bamberg	Brose Baskets	Phantoms Braunschweig	69–66	Not awarded
2012	Bonn	Brose Baskets	Telekom Baskets Bonn	82–73	Not awarded
2013	Berlin	Alba Berlin	ratiopharm Ulm	85–67	Not awarded
2014	Ulm	Alba Berlin	ratiopharm Ulm	86–80	Not awarded
2015	Oldenburg	EWE Baskets Oldenburg	Brose Baskets	72–70	Not awarded
2016	Munich	Alba Berlin	Bayern Munich	67–65	Not awarded
2017	Berlin	Brose Bamberg	Bayern Munich	74–71	Not awarded
2018	Ulm	Bayern Munich	Alba Berlin	80–75	Not awarded
2019	Bamberg	Brose Bamberg	Alba Berlin	83–82	Not awarded
2021	Munich	Bayern Munich	Alba Berlin	85–79	Vladimir Lučić
2022	Berlin	Alba Berlin	Crailsheim Merlins	86–76	Maodo Lô
2023	Oldenburg	Bayern Munich	Baskets Oldenburg	90–78	Nick Weiler-Babb
2024	Munich	Bayern Munich	ratiopharm Ulm	81–65	Sylvain Francisco
2025	Weißenfels	Mitteldeutscher BC	Bamberg Baskets	97–87	Michael Devoe
2026	Munich	BMA365 Bamberg Baskets	Alba Berlin	74–72	Demarcus Demonia

=== Knockout tournament (2020) ===
In 2020 on, a knockout tournament was held to determine the winner of the BBL-Pokal.

Year	Host city	Champion	Runner-up	Score	MVP
2020	Berlin	Alba Berlin	EWE Baskets Oldenburg	89–56	Martin Hermannsson

== Performance by club ==
Team	Winners	Runners-up	Years
Alba Berlin	11	5	1997, 1999, 2002, 2003, 2006, 2009, 2013, 2014, 2016, 2020, 2022
Bayer Giants Leverkusen	10	3	1970, 1971, 1974, 1976, 1986, 1987, 1990, 1991, 1993, 1995
Bamberg Baskets	7	3	1992, 2010, 2011, 2012, 2017, 2019, 2026
Bayern Munich	5	2	1968, 2018, 2021, 2023, 2024
Gießen 46ers	3	4	1969, 1973, 1979
BSC Saturn Köln	3	3	1980, 1981, 1983
Köln 99ers	3	1	2004, 2005, 2007
SSV Hagen	2	6	1975, 1994
MTV Wolfenbüttel	2	3	1972, 1982
medi Bayreuth	2	2	1988, 1989
USC Heidelberg	2	1	1977, 1978
ASC 1846 Göttingen	2	1	1984, 1985
TBB Trier	2	0	1998, 2001
ratiopharm Ulm	1	5	1996
EWE Baskets Oldenburg	1	3	2015
VfL Osnabrück	1	2	1967
Skyliners Frankfurt	1	2	2000
Artland Dragons	1	1	2008
Mitteldeutscher BC	1	0	2025
Telekom Baskets Bonn	0	3	
EnBW Ludwigsburg	0	2	
Phantoms Braunschweig	0	2	
ATV 1877 Düsseldorf	0	1	
USC Mainz	0	1	
Hamburger Turnerbund	0	1	
Dragons Rhöndorf	0	1	
Crailsheim Merlins	0	1	

== Sources ==
- All cup finals and scores
