= Basketball Bundesliga =

Premier German basketball league

- Founded: 1966; 60 years ago
- First season: 1966–67
- Country: Germany
- Federation: Germany Federation
- Confederation: FIBA Europe
- Number of teams: 18
- Relegation to: ProA
- Domestic cup: BBL-Pokal
- Supercup: BBL Champions Cup
- International cup(s): EuroLeague; EuroCup; Champions League; Europe Cup
- Current champions: Alba Berlin (12th title) (2025–26)
- Most championships: Bayer Giants Leverkusen (14 titles)
- Most appearances: Alex King (638)
- All-time top scorer: Mike Jackel (10,783)
- TV partners: Dyn Sport; Fanseat (select foreign markets)
- Website: easycredit-bbl.de
- 2026–27 Basketball Bundesliga

The Basketball Bundesliga (BBL) (English language: Federal Basketball League), for sponsorship reasons named easyCredit BBL, is the highest level league of professional club basketball in Germany. The league comprises 18 teams. A BBL season is split into a league stage and a playoff stage. At the end of the league stage, the top eight teams qualify for the playoff stage, and the teams positioned in the 17th and 18th places are relegated to a lower-tier league. The playoffs are played in a "Best of five" format. The winning team of the final round are crowned the German Champions of that season.

In addition to the league competition, all BBL teams compete for the German Basketball Cup. Teams playing in the second league (ProA or ProB), or in a lower level Regionalliga, are also eligible to participate in the BBL-Cup. There are always 3 knock-out rounds that are played for the BBL-Cup. If more teams from the leagues below the BBL level apply for participation, then available places, and additional qualification rounds are added for them. The final four remaining teams determine the rankings for bronze, silver, and gold medals, in knock-out matches that are termed the BBL-TOP4. The gold winning team is the German Basketball Cup winner.

The Basketball Bundesliga is run by the Basketball Bundesliga GmbH. 74% of BBL GmbH is owned by the AG BBL e.V. (which is composed of the clubs), and 26% by the German Basketball Federation (DBB).

== History ==
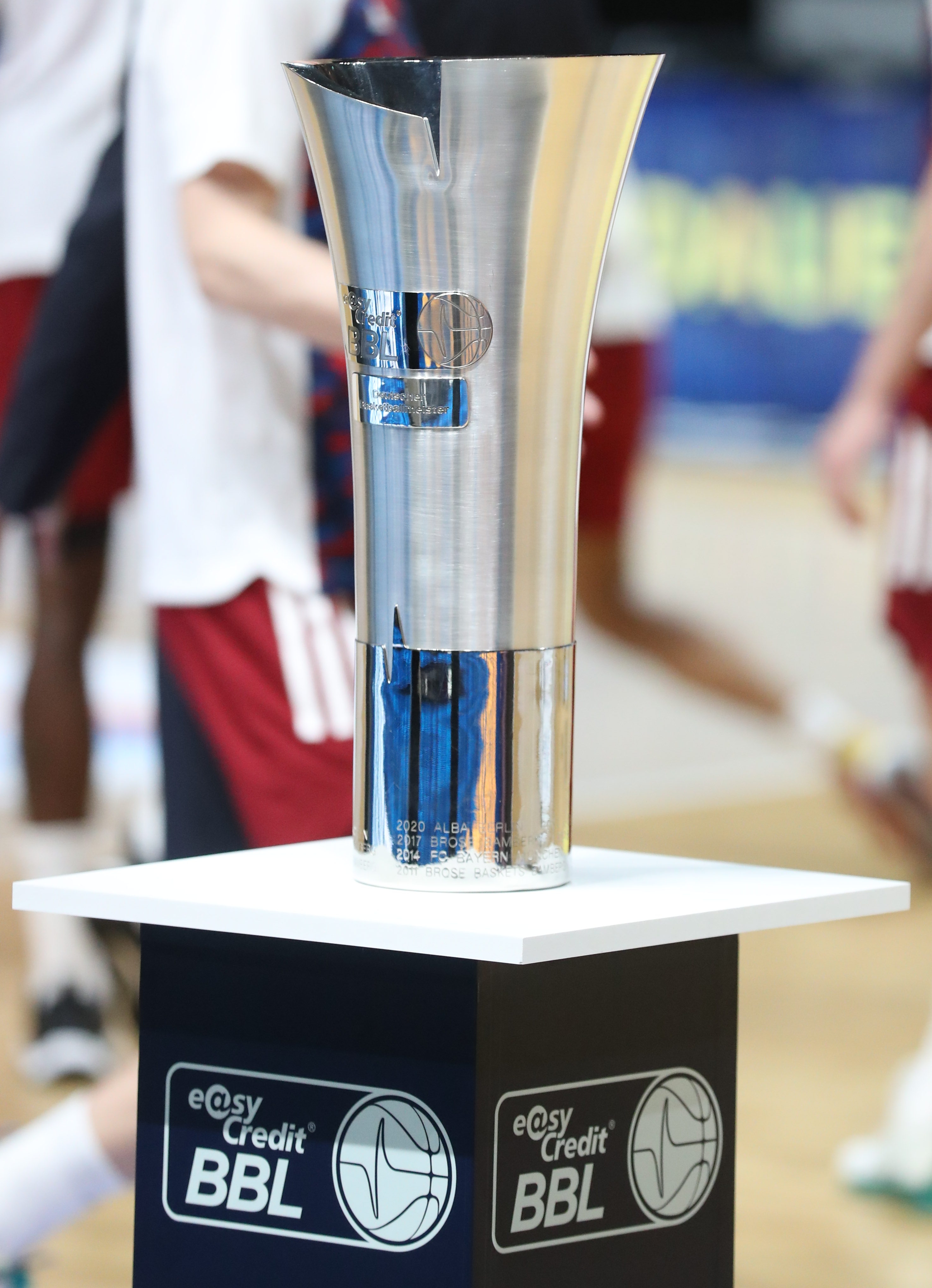
The Basketball Bundesliga trophy

In Germany, a national domestic basketball championship was first organised in 1939, and it was won by LSV Spandau. By 1944, almost all basketball activity in the country was forced to an end, due to the Second World War. In 1947, MTSV Schwabing München became the first champion of post-war divided Germany.

The creation of a split West German federal-league, consisting of one northern division and one southern division, each comprising 10 teams, was decided on by the German Basketball Federation (DBB) in 1964. On 1 October 1966, the first season of the so-called Basketball Bundesliga started. Starting with the 1971–72 season, the size of each division was reduced to 8 teams.

With the 1975–76 season, the league structure was changed into a ten team first league (1. Basketball Bundesliga), and a 20 team second league (2. Basketball Bundesliga). Only the second league was split into a northern and a southern division, of 10 teams each. In 1985, the top league was enlarged to a size of 12 teams, and two years later, each division of the second league was also enlarged to 12 teams.

In 1988, the championship mode "Best of five" was applied for the first time. Starting with the 1995–96 season, the first league consisted of 14 teams. The Basketball Bundesliga GmbH (BBL) was founded in October 1996.

The federal leagues received their own administration within the framework of the German Basketball Federation in 1997. Since then, the second league divisions have been administered by the "AG 2. Bundesliga", while the BBL has been responsible for the first league. Two years later, a contract was signed between the BBL and the German Basketball Federation, in which the federation transferred its marketing/events rights to the BBL, for a 10-year duration, and in return, the BBL agreed to pay an annual "amateur support fee" of DM 600,000 (€ 306,775).

Starting with the 2003–04 season, the top league was increased to 16 teams, and in 2006–07, it was further increased to its present size of 18 teams. For the following 2007–08 season, the structure of the second league was reshaped from its northern/southern divisions, into a ProA division, and a ProB division. These divisions remained under the administration by "AG 2. Bundesliga".

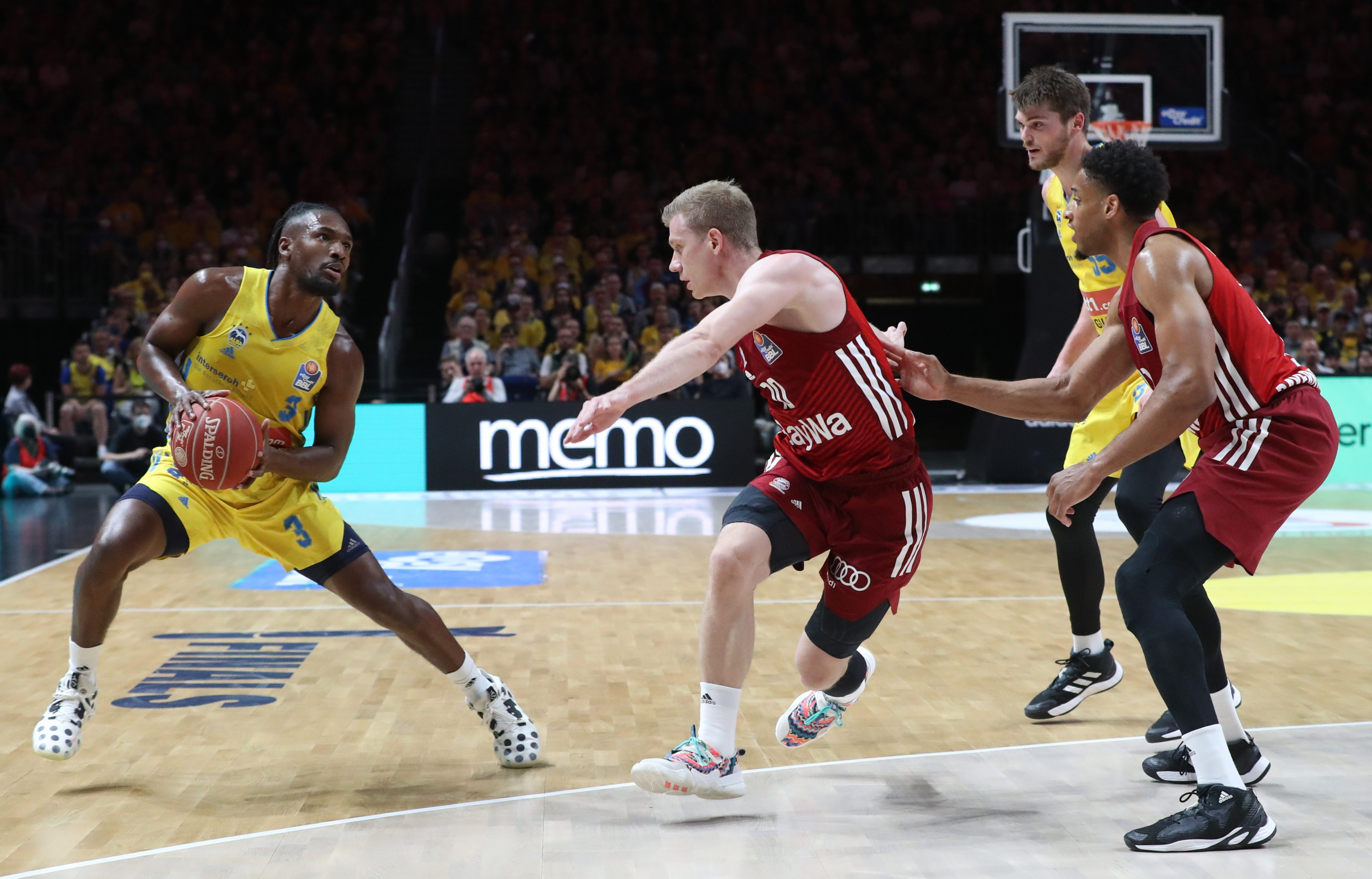
Game 3 of the BBL Finals in 2022

Between 1994 and 2001, the highest level German basketball league was called "Veltins Basketball Bundesliga", and from 2001, until 2003, the league was known as "s.Oliver Basketball Bundesliga". Bayer Giants Leverkusen hold the league titles won record, being the winner of 14 German Basketball Championships. However, since 1997, Alba Berlin has dominated the league, winning their 8th title in 2008. Twenty-one teams have won the championship, since its inception.

Since 2009, Brose Bamberg dominated the competition and won the title in four straight seasons (2009-2013).

== Sponsorship ==
In 2016, the BBL joined forces with Tipbet, a Malta-based betting company. This made Tipbet the Official Betting and Premium Sponsor of the league; the sponsorship agreement results in advertising activities throughout the arenas and online, and runs until 2018.

== Arena rules ==
Currently, all Bundesliga clubs must play in arenas that seat at least 3,000 people.

== Logos, names, and sponsorship names ==
- 1966–2009Basketball Bundesliga
- 2009–2016Beko BBL
- 2016–2021easyCredit BBL
Logo of 2010–2016

== Clubs ==
Members of the 2026–27 Basketball Bundesliga:

Location of teams in 2026–27 Basketball Bundesliga

=== Arenas and locations ===
Team	City	Arena	Capacity
Bamberg Baskets	Bamberg	Brose Arena	6,150
Alba Berlin	Berlin	Uber Arena	14,500
Telekom Baskets Bonn	Bonn	Telekom Dome	6,000
Löwen Braunschweig	Braunschweig	Volkswagen Halle	6,600
Niners Chemnitz	Chemnitz	Chemnitz Arena	5,200
Skyliners Frankfurt	Frankfurt	Süwag Energie ARENA	5,002
Phoenix Hagen	Hagen	Krollmann Arena	3,150
Veolia Towers Hamburg	Hamburg	Inselpark Arena	3,400
Science City Jena	Jena	Sparkassen-Arena	3,000
MHP Riesen Ludwigsburg	Ludwigsburg	MHP-Arena	5,300
Bayern Munich	Munich	BMW Park	6,700
ratiopharm Ulm	Neu-Ulm	ratiopharm arena	6,000
EWE Baskets Oldenburg	Oldenburg	Große EWE Arena	6,069
Rostock Seawolves	Rostock	Stadthalle Rostock	4,550
Vet-Concept Gladiators Trier	Trier	SWT-Arena	5,495
Rasta Vechta	Vechta	Rasta Dome	3,140
Syntainics MBC	Weißenfels	Stadthalle Weißenfels	3,000
FIT/One Würzburg Baskets	Würzburg	Tectake Arena	3,140

== Title holders ==
- 1938–39: LSV Spandau
- 1939-46: Not held due to World War II
- 1946–47: MTSV Schwabing
- 1947–48: Turnerbund Heidelberg
- 1948–49: MTSV Schwabing
- 1949–50: Stuttgart-Degerloch
- 1950–51: Turnerbund Heidelberg
- 1951–52: Turnerbund Heidelberg
- 1952–53: Turnerbund Heidelberg
- 1953–54: Bayern Munich
- 1954–55: Bayern Munich
- 1955–56: ATV Düsseldorf
- 1956–57: USC Heidelberg
- 1957–58: USC Heidelberg
- 1958–59: USC Heidelberg
- 1959–60: USC Heidelberg
- 1960–61: USC Heidelberg
- 1961–62: USC Heidelberg
- 1962–63: Alemannia Aachen
- 1963–64: Alemannia Aachen
- 1964–65: Gießen 46ers
- 1965–66: USC Heidelberg
- 1966–67: Gießen 46ers
- 1967–68: Gießen 46ers
- 1968–69: VfL Osnabrück
- 1969–70: TuS 04 Leverkusen
- 1970–71: TuS 04 Leverkusen
- 1971–72: TuS 04 Leverkusen
- 1972–73: USC Heidelberg
- 1973–74: SSV Hagen
- 1974–75: Gießen 46ers
- 1975–76: TuS 04 Leverkusen
- 1976–77: USC Heidelberg
- 1977–78: Gießen 46ers
- 1978–79: TuS 04 Leverkusen
- 1979–80: ASC 1846 Göttingen
- 1980–81: Saturn 77 Köln
- 1981–82: Saturn 77 Köln
- 1982–83: ASC 1846 Göttingen
- 1983–84: ASC 1846 Göttingen
- 1984–85: Bayer 04 Leverkusen
- 1985–86: Bayer 04 Leverkusen
- 1986–87: Saturn 77 Köln
- 1987–88: Saturn 77 Köln
- 1988–89: Steiner Bayreuth
- 1989–90: Bayer 04 Leverkusen
- 1990–91: Bayer 04 Leverkusen
- 1991–92: Bayer 04 Leverkusen
- 1992–93: Bayer 04 Leverkusen
- 1993–94: Bayer 04 Leverkusen
- 1994–95: Bayer 04 Leverkusen
- 1995–96: Bayer 04 Leverkusen
- 1996–97: Alba Berlin
- 1997–98: Alba Berlin
- 1998–99: Alba Berlin
- 1999–00: Alba Berlin
- 2000–01: Alba Berlin
- 2001–02: Alba Berlin
- 2002–03: Alba Berlin
- 2003–04: Opel Skyliners
- 2004–05: GHP Bamberg
- 2005–06: RheinEnergie Köln
- 2006–07: Brose Baskets
- 2007–08: Alba Berlin
- 2008–09: EWE Baskets Oldenburg
- 2009–10: Brose Baskets
- 2010–11: Brose Baskets
- 2011–12: Brose Baskets
- 2012–13: Brose Baskets
- 2013–14: Bayern Munich
- 2014–15: Brose Baskets
- 2015–16: Brose Baskets
- 2016–17: Brose Bamberg
- 2017–18: Bayern Munich
- 2018–19: Bayern Munich
- 2019–20: Alba Berlin
- 2020–21: Alba Berlin
- 2021–22: Alba Berlin
- 2022–23: Ratiopharm Ulm
- 2023–24: Bayern Munich
- 2024–25: Bayern Munich
- 2025–26: Alba Berlin

== Titles by club ==
Champion	Titles	Winning years
Bayer 04 Leverkusen	14	1969–70, 1970–71, 1971–72, 1975–76, 1978–79, 1984–85, 1985–86, 1989–90, 1990–91, 1991–92, 1992–93, 1993–94, 1994–95, 1995–96
Alba Berlin	12	1996–97, 1997–98, 1998–99, 1999–00, 2000–01, 2001–02, 2002–03, 2007–08, 2019–20, 2020–21, 2021–22, 2025–26
USC Heidelberg	9	1956–57, 1957–58, 1958–59, 1959–60, 1960–61, 1961–62, 1965–66, 1972–73, 1976–77
Bamberg Baskets	9	2004–05, 2006–07, 2009–10, 2010–11, 2011–12, 2012–13, 2014–15, 2015–16, 2016–17
Bayern Munich	7	1953–54, 1954–55, 2013–14, 2017–18, 2018–19, 2023–24, 2024–25
Gießen 46ers	5	1964–65, 1966–67, 1967–68, 1974–75, 1977–78
Turnerbund Heidelberg	4	1947–48, 1950–51, 1951–52, 1952–53
Saturn Köln	4	1980–81, 1981–82, 1986–87, 1987–88
ASC 1846 Göttingen	3	1979–80, 1982–83, 1983–84
MTSV Schwabing	2	1946–47, 1948–49
Alemannia Aachen	2	1962–63, 1963–64
LSV Spandau	1	1938–39
Stuttgart-Degerloch	1	1949–50
ATV Düsseldorf	1	1955–56
Osnabrück	1	1968–69
SSV Hagen	1	1973–74
Steiner Bayreuth	1	1988–89
Skyliners Frankfurt	1	2003–04
RheinStars Köln	1	2005–06
EWE Baskets Oldenburg	1	2008–09
Ratiopharm Ulm	1	2022–23

== Finals ==
Season	Home court advantage	Result	Home court disadvantage	Regular season champion	Record
1986–87	Bayer 04 Leverkusen	0–2	Saturn Köln	Bayer 04 Leverkusen	18–2
1987–88	Bayer 04 Leverkusen	1–3	Saturn Köln	Bayer 04 Leverkusen	19–3
1988–89	Steiner Bayreuth	3–2	Bayer 04 Leverkusen	Steiner Bayreuth	20–2
1989–90	Steiner Bayreuth	1–3	Bayer 04 Leverkusen	Steiner Bayreuth	21–1
1990–91	Bayer 04 Leverkusen	3–2	BG Charlottenburg	Bayer 04 Leverkusen	30–2
1991–92	Bayer 04 Leverkusen	3–0	Alba Berlin	Bayer 04 Leverkusen	28–4
1992–93	Bayer 04 Leverkusen	3–1	TTL Bamberg	Bayer 04 Leverkusen	26–6
1993–94	Bayer 04 Leverkusen	3–0	Brandt Hagen	Bayer 04 Leverkusen	28–4
1994–95	Bayer 04 Leverkusen	3–0	Alba Berlin	Bayer 04 Leverkusen	28–4
1995–96	Bayer 04 Leverkusen	3–1	Alba Berlin	Bayer 04 Leverkusen	24–2
1996–97	Alba Berlin	3–1	Telekom Baskets Bonn	Alba Berlin	24–2
1997–98	Alba Berlin	3–0	Ratiopharm Ulm	Alba Berlin	21–3
1998–99	Alba Berlin	3–2	Telekom Baskets Bonn	Alba Berlin	22–4
1999–00	Alba Berlin	3–0	Bayer 04 Leverkusen	Alba Berlin	24–2
2000–01	Alba Berlin	3–0	Telekom Baskets Bonn	Alba Berlin	25–1
2001–02	RheinEnergie Köln	0–3	Alba Berlin	Opel Skyliners	20–6
2002–03	Alba Berlin	3–0	TSK Bamberg	Telekom Baskets Bonn	19–7
2003–04	Opel Skyliners	3–2	GHP Bamberg	Alba Berlin	20–8
2004–05	GHP Bamberg	3–2	Opel Skyliners	Alba Berlin	22–8
2005–06	Alba Berlin	1–3	RheinEnergie Köln	Alba Berlin	26–4
2006–07	Brose Baskets	3–1	Artland Dragons	Alba Berlin	28–6
2007–08	Alba Berlin	3–1	Telekom Baskets Bonn	Alba Berlin	27–7
2008–09	EWE Baskets Oldenburg	3–2	Telekom Baskets Bonn	Alba Berlin	26–8
2009–10	Brose Baskets	3–2	Deutsche Bank Skyliners	EWE Baskets Oldenburg	25–9
2010–11	Brose Baskets	3–2	Alba Berlin	Brose Baskets	32–2
2011–12	Brose Baskets	3–0	Ratiopharm Ulm	Brose Baskets	30–4
2012–13	Brose Baskets	3–0	EWE Baskets Oldenburg	Brose Baskets	26–8
2013–14	Bayern Munich	3–1	Alba Berlin	Bayern Munich	29–5
2014–15	Brose Baskets	3–2	Bayern Munich	Brose Baskets	29–5
2015–16	Brose Baskets	3–0	Ratiopharm Ulm	Brose Baskets	31–3
2016–17	Brose Bamberg	3–0	EWE Baskets Oldenburg	Ratiopharm Ulm	30–2
2017–18	Bayern Munich	3–2	Alba Berlin	Bayern Munich	31–3
2018–19	Bayern Munich	3–0	Alba Berlin	Bayern Munich	31–3
2019–20	Alba Berlin	163–139	Riesen Ludwigsburg	Bayern Munich	19–2
2020–21	Alba Berlin	3–1	Bayern Munich	Riesen Ludwigsburg	30–4
2021–22	Alba Berlin	3–1	Bayern Munich	Alba Berlin	27–6
2022–23	Telekom Baskets Bonn	1–3	Ratiopharm Ulm	Telekom Baskets Bonn	32–2
2023–24	Bayern Munich	3–1	Alba Berlin	Bayern Munich	28–6
2024–25	Bayern Munich	3–2	Ratiopharm Ulm	Bayern Munich	24–8
2025–26	Bayern Munich	2–3	Alba Berlin	Bayern Munich	29–5

== Awards ==
=== Finals MVPs ===
- Player nationality by national team.

Season	Finals MVP
2004–05	(United States) Chris Williams
2005–06	(United States) Immanuel McElroy
2006–07	(United States) Casey Jacobsen
2007–08	(United States) Julius Jenkins
2008–09	(United States) Rickey Paulding
2009–10	(United States) Casey Jacobsen
2010–11	(United States) Kyle Hines
2011–12	(United States) P. J. Tucker
2012–13	(Germany) Anton Gavel
2013–14	(United States) Malcolm Delaney
2014–15	(United States) Brad Wanamaker
2015–16	(United States) Darius Miller
2016–17	(France) Fabien Causeur
2017–18	(Germany) Danilo Barthel
2018–19	(Bosnia and Herzegovina) Nihad Đedović
2019–20	(United States) Marcos Knight
2020–21	(Uruguay) Jayson Granger
2021–22	(Germany) Johannes Thiemann
2022–23	(Brazil) Yago dos Santos
2023–24	(United States) Carsen Edwards
2024–25	(United States) Shabazz Napier
2025–26	(United States) Justin Bean

== See also ==
- Basketball in Germany
- German Basketball League Champions
- German Basketball League Awards
- German Basketball Cup
- German Basketball Supercup
- German League All-Star Game

== Sources ==
- All finals and scores
