= Jan Niklas Wimberg =

German basketball player (born 1996)

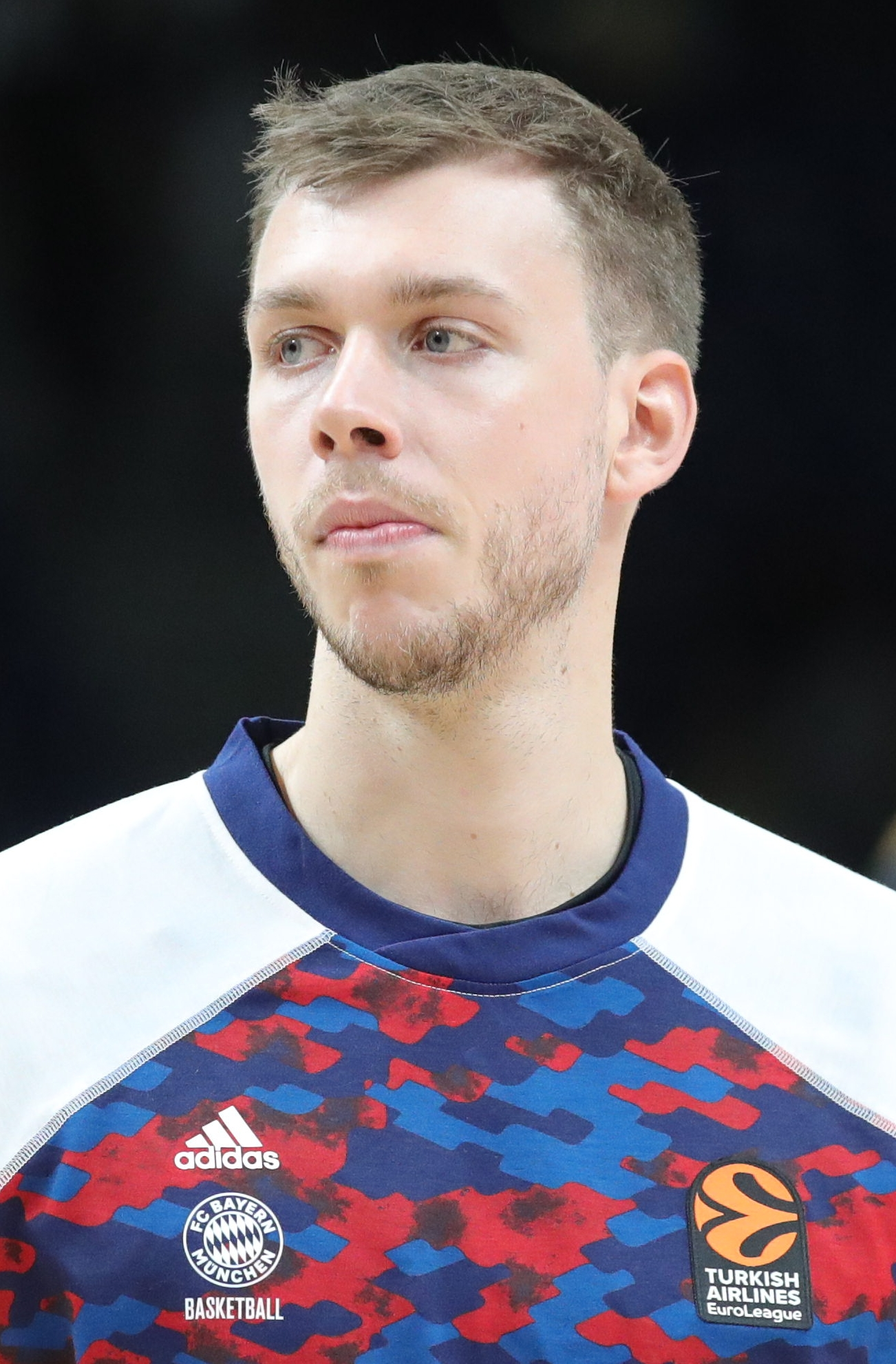
- Wimberg with Bayern Munich in 2022

No. 8 – Palmer Basket
- Position: Power forward
- League: Primera FEB

Personal information
- Born: 11 February 1996 (age 30) Oldenburg, Germany
- Listed height: 2.06 m (6 ft 9 in)
- Listed weight: 93 kg (205 lb)

Career information
- Playing career: 2014–present

Career history
- 2014–2017: Baskets Oldenburg
- 2017–2018: Rockets Gotha
- 2018–2019: Eisbären Bremerhaven
- 2019–2022: Niners Chemnitz
- 2022–2024: Bayern Munich
- 2024–2026: Hamburg Towers
- 2026–present: Palmer Basket

Jan Niklas Wimberg (born 11 February 1996) is a German professional basketball player for Palmer Basket of the Spanish Primera FEB. He also represents the Germany national team.

== Personal life ==
He studied Economics in the IU International University of Applied Sciences.

== National team career ==
He was a member of the Germany national team at the 2020 Summer Olympics in Tokyo.

== Career statistics ==
Legend
GP	Games played	GS	Games started	MPG	Minutes per game
FG%	Field-goal percentage	3P%	3-point field-goal percentage	FT%	Free-throw percentage
RPG	Rebounds per game	APG	Assists per game	SPG	Steals per game
BPG	Blocks per game	PPG	Points per game	PIR	Performance index rating
**Bold**	Career high

=== EuroLeague ===
Year	Team	GP	GS	MPG	FG%	3P%	FT%	RPG	APG	SPG	BPG	PPG	PIR
2022–23	Bayern Munich	**21**	**7**	**11.1**	.353	.240	—	1.2	**.5**	**.1**	.1	**2.0**	1.0
2023–24	Bayern Munich	12	0	7.8	**.417**	**.333**	**.750**	**1.3**	.4	**.1**	**.3**	1.3	**1.7**
Career		33	7	9.9	.365	.258	.750	1.3	.5	.1	.2	1.7	1.2

=== EuroCup ===
Year	Team	GP	GS	MPG	FG%	3P%	FT%	RPG	APG	SPG	BPG	PPG	PIR
2014–15	Oldenburg	2	0	4.0	.000	—	—	**1.5**	—	—	—	0.0	-0.5
2015–16	Oldenburg	**9**	0	**6.3**	**.222**	**.167**	—	.6	**.2**	—	—	**0.6**	-0.7
Career		11	0	5.9	.200	.167	—	.7	.2	—	—	0.5	-0.6

=== Basketball Champions League ===
Year	Team	GP	GS	MPG	FG%	3P%	FT%	RPG	APG	SPG	BPG	PPG
2016–17	Oldenburg	15	4	9.5	.355	.286	.667	1.6	.2	.2	.3	1.9
Career		15	4	9.5	.355	.286	.667	1.6	.2	.2	.3	1.9

=== Domestic leagues ===
Year	Team	League	GP	MPG	FG%	3P%	FT%	RPG	APG	SPG	BPG	PPG
2012–13	(Germany) Oldenburg Juniors	ProB	20	17.8	.431	.219	.692	2.6	1.3	.4	.6	3.6
2014–15	(Germany) Oldenburg Juniors	ProB	30	31.4	.405	.322	.720	5.6	2.2	1.0	1.1	10.8
2014–15	(Germany) Oldenburg	BBL	5	4.4	.400	.000	—	.2	.4	—	—	0.8
2015–16	(Germany) Oldenburg Juniors	ProB	16	31.6	.380	.276	.792	5.3	3.5	1.1	1.0	11.4
2015–16	(Germany) Oldenburg	BBL	21	5.5	.450	.467	—	.9	.3	.1	.0	1.2
2016–17	(Germany) Oldenburg Juniors	ProB	14	24.6	.412	.344	.800	4.9	2.1	.6	.6	9.4
2016–17	(Germany) Oldenburg	BBL	21	6.3	.313	.333	.700	.9	.2	.2	.1	1.0
2017–18	(Germany) Rockets Gotha	BBL	26	16.0	.441	.322	.882	2.3	.7	.4	.4	4.8
2018–19	(Germany) E. Bremerhaven	BBL	31	18.1	.405	.268	.875	2.5	.9	.3	.4	4.2
2019–20	(Germany) Niners Chemnitz	ProA	26	21.5	.541	.441	.938	3.7	2.0	.6	.5	10.5
2020–21	(Germany) Niners Chemnitz	BBL	26	26.9	.470	.346	.953	4.7	1.5	.9	1.0	8.6
2021–22	(Germany) Niners Chemnitz	BBL	26	24.6	.431	.264	.769	4.4	1.2	.5	.4	6.4
2022–23	(Germany) Bayern Munich	BBL	36	14.3	.404	.333	.400	2.4	.7	.5	.3	2.6
2023–24	(Germany) Bayern Munich	BBL	30	12.7	.471	.281	1.000	1.7	.7	.2	.4	2.6
