= 2016–17 ProA =

ProA
- Season: 2016–17
- Dates: 22 September 2016 – 7 May 2017
- Teams: 16

Regular season
- Top seed: Mitteldeutscher
- Season MVP: (Germany) Leon Kratzer
- Relegated: ETB Wohnbau Baskets; Dresden Titans

Finals
- Champions: Mitteldeutscher; 3rd title
- Runners-up: Oettinger Rockets

Statistical leaders
Points	(United States) Jonathon Williams	18.8
Rebounds	(Germany) Leon Kratzer	12.6
Assists	(United States) Carrington Love	7.1
Index Rating	(Germany) Leon Kratzer	21.6

Records
- Average attendance: 1,524

The 2016–17 ProA was the 10th season of the ProA, the second level of basketball in Germany. The champions the runners-up of the play-offs are promoted to the 2017–18 Basketball Bundesliga. The season started on September 22, 2016 and ended on May 7, 2017. Mitteldeutscher won the championship and promoted along with runners-up Oettinger Rockets.

== Table ==
Pos	Team	Pld	W	L	PF	PA	PD	Pts	Promotion, qualification or relegation
1	Mitteldeutscher	30	27	3	2574	2164	+410	54	Advance to play-offs
2	Crailsheim Merlins	30	25	5	2631	2236	+395	50	Advance to play-offs
3	Niners Chemnitz	30	21	9	2289	2124	+165	42	Advance to play-offs
4	Kirchheim Knights	30	20	10	2369	2331	+38	40	Advance to play-offs
5	MLP Academics Heidelberg	30	18	12	2209	2090	+119	36	Advance to play-offs
6	Gladiators Trier	30	17	13	2221	2183	+38	34	Advance to play-offs
7	Oettinger Rockets	30	16	14	2344	2248	+96	32	Advance to play-offs
8	RheinStars Köln	30	15	15	2232	2187	+45	30	Advance to play-offs
9	Hamburg Towers	30	14	16	2256	2260	−4	28	
10	Uni Baskets Paderborn	30	14	16	2322	2342	−20	28	
11	White Wings Hanau	30	13	17	2159	2214	−55	26	
12	Nürnberg Falcons	30	11	19	2204	2346	−142	22	
13	Baunach Young Pikes	30	10	20	2172	2432	−260	20	
14	Erdgas Ehingen/Urspringschule	30	9	21	2236	2432	−196	18	
15	ETB Wohnbau Baskets (R)	30	8	22	2221	2421	−200	16	Relegation to ProB
16	Dresden Titans (R)	30	2	28	2205	2682	−477	4	Relegation to ProB

Source: Scoresway, 2. Basketball Bundesliga
(R) Relegated

== Play-offs ==
The quarter-finals and semi-finals were played in a best-of-five play-off format. The Finals are played in a two-legged series in which the team with the most aggregate points wins.

Quarterfinals
1	Mitteldeutscher	3
8	RheinStars Köln	0
4	Kirchheim Knights	3
5	MLP Academics Heidelberg	2
2	Crailsheim Merlins	1
7	Oettinger Rockets	3
3	Niners Chemnitz	3
6	Gladiators Trier	2

Semifinals
1	Mitteldeutscher	3
4	Kirchheim Knights	0
7	Oettinger Rockets	3
3	Niners Chemnitz	2

Finals
1	▲ Mitteldeutscher	171
7	▲ Oettinger Rockets	142

▲ The two teams that reached the Finals were promoted to the 2017–18 Basketball Bundesliga.

== Awards ==
=== Monthly Awards ===
Month	Player of the Month		Youngster of the Month	
Month	Player	Club	Player	Club
October	(Germany) Leon Kratzer	Baunach Young Pikes	(Germany) Chrisopher Wolf	Erdgas Ehingen/Urspringschule
November	(United States) Kruize Pinkins	White Wings Hanau	(Germany) Jonas Richter	Niners Chemnitz
December	(United States) Marcus Hatten	Mitteldeutscher	(Germany) Daniel Mixich	Niners Chemnitz
January	(Germany) Tobias Jahn	Erdgas Ehingen/Urspringschule	(Slovenia) Aleksej Nikolić	Baunach Young Pikes
February	(United States) Joseph Lawson III	Niners Chemnitz	(Lithuania) Arnoldas Kulboka	Baunach Young Pikes
March	(United States) Christopher Carter	Niners Chemnitz	(Germany) Leon Kratzer	Baunach Young Pikes

== See also ==
- 2016–17 Basketball Bundesliga
- 2016–17 ProB
