= David Krämer =

German basketball player (born 1997)

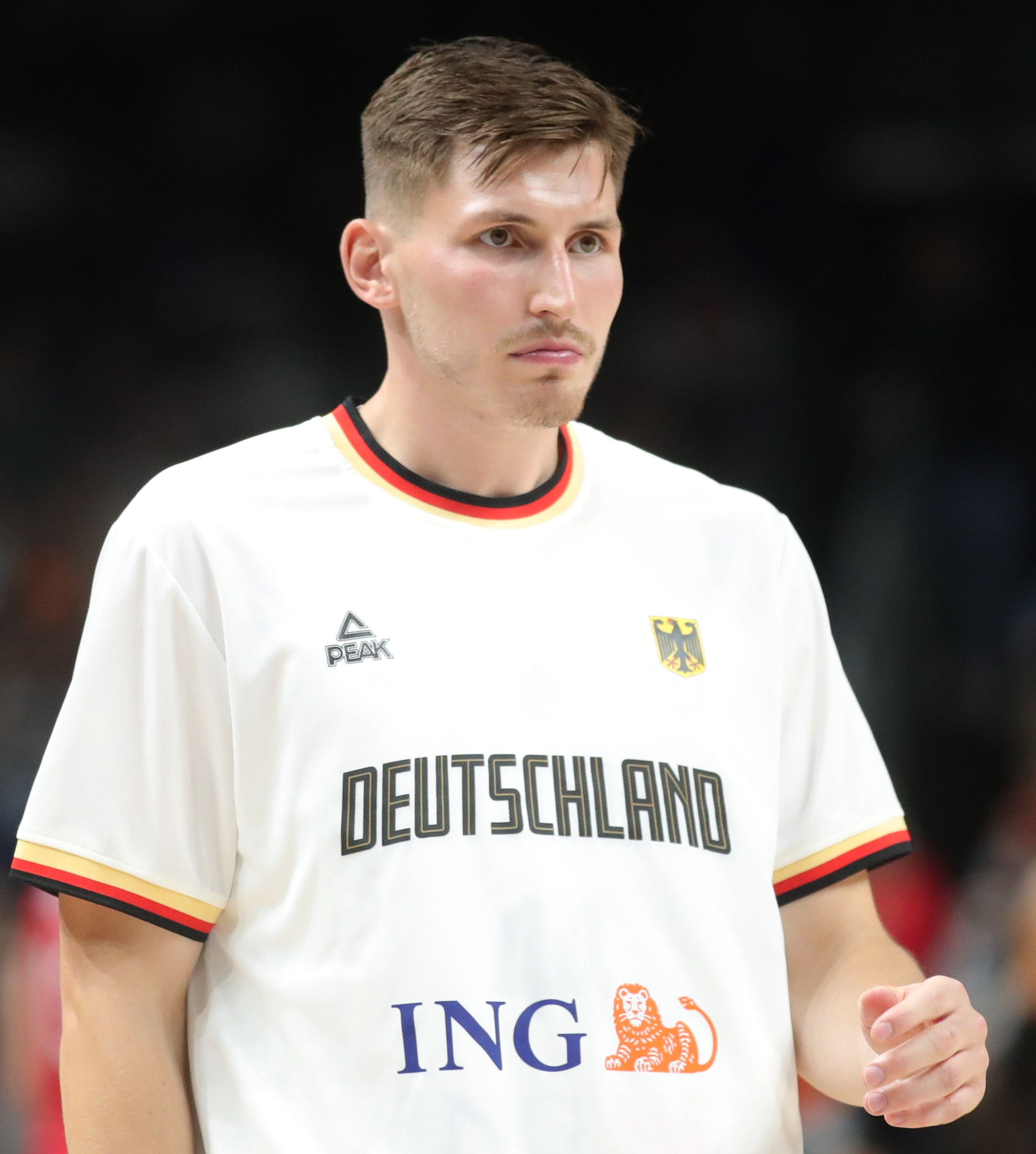
- 2023 with the German national team

No. 44 – Crvena zvezda
- Position: Shooting guard / small forward
- League: KLS; ABA League; EuroLeague

Personal information
- Born: January 14, 1997 (age 29) Myjava, Slovakia
- Listed height: 6 ft 6 in (1.98 m)
- Listed weight: 202 lb (92 kg)

Career information
- NBA draft: 2019: undrafted
- Playing career: 2013–present

Career history
- 2013–2014: Oberwart Gunners
- 2014–2019: Ratiopharm Ulm
- 2014–2019: →OrangeAcademy
- 2019–2020: Northern Arizona Suns
- 2021: Bayern Munich
- 2021–2023: Löwen Braunschweig
- 2023–2024: Granada
- 2024–2025: Tenerife
- 2025–2026: Real Madrid
- 2026–present: Crvena zvezda

Career highlights
- ProB champion (2017); ProB Best Young Player (2017)
- Stats at Basketball Reference
Medals
Men's basketball
Representing Germany
FIBA World Cup
Gold medal – first place	2023 Philippines–Japan–Indonesia

David Krämer (born January 14, 1997) is a Slovak-German professional basketball player for Crvena zvezda of the Basketball League of Serbia (KLS), the ABA League, and the EuroLeague. He also plays for the Germany national team.

== Early life ==
Krämer was born in Myjava, Slovakia, the country his mother was born in and where his father Roman was playing professional basketball. Krämer and his family soon moved to Austria when his father was signed by an Austrian team; Krämer started playing basketball at the age of four, and later joined the youth ranks of Austrian team Oberwart Gunners, where he played alongside his brother Filip (who is also a professional basketball player). Krämer is of partial Serbian and German descent through his great-grandfathers, who emigrated from Germany to Czechoslovakia.

== Professional career ==
=== Oberwart Gunners (2013–2014) ===
Krämer made his professional debut in the Austrian Basketball Bundesliga at the age of 17 during the 2013–14 season, playing a total of 13 games (10 regular season games and 3 in the playoffs) with Oberwart Gunners, receiving limited playing time.

=== Ratiopharm Ulm (2014–2019) ===
In May 2014 Krämer signed with German team Ratiopharm Ulm, and joined its ranks in August of that year. In order to aid his development as a player, ratiopharm Ulm sent Krämer to play with its affiliate team Weißenhorn Youngstars (currently known as OrangeAcademy) in the ProB, the third level of German basketball. In his first season with the new club, Krämer averaged 8.9 points, 1.9 rebounds and 1 assist per game in 24 appearances (10 starts). In the 2015–16 season, Krämer made his debut in the Basketball Bundesliga with ratiopharm Ulm, playing his first game on October 10, 2015, against Phoenix Hagen, scoring 3 points in 1 minute and 54 seconds of playing time. In that season, Krämer played 26 games with Weißenhorn (14 points, 4.5 rebounds, 1.7 assists per game) in ProB and 14 with ratiopharm Ulm (2 points, 0.7 rebounds and 0.4 assists per game) in the Bundesliga. He also made his debut at international club level, and played 3 Eurocup games.

In the 2016–17 season, Krämer played 30 games (28 starts) in ProB with Weißenhorn, averaging 15.4 points, 4.7 rebounds and 1.5 assists per game in 27.8 minutes, shooting 43.9% from the field and 36.8% on three-pointers. Weißenhorn won the league title, and Krämer was named the league's best young player (Youngster Der Saison award). He also played a total of 18 games with ratiopharm Ulm in the Bundesliga (15 during the regular season and 3 in the playoffs), averaging 2.2 points, 0.9 rebounds and 0.2 assists in 6 minutes of average playing time. He was regularly featured during the Eurocup, appearing in 10 games and averaging 1,9 points, 1.3 rebounds and 0.5 assists in 8 minutes per game.

For the 2017–18 season, Weißenhorn Youngstars changed their name to OrangeAcademy. Krämer made his debut in the ProA, the second tier of basketball in Germany, having obtained the promotion from ProB the previous season. He played a total of 27 games in the 2017–18 ProA with the team and averaged 16.9 points, 4.7 rebounds and 1.9 assists, shooting 43.3% from the field and 30.1 from three, playing a career-high 29.5 minutes per game. He also obtained increased playing time with ratiopharm Ulm during the 2017–18 Basketball Bundesliga season, appearing in 22 games with averages of 4.6 points, 1.3 rebounds and 0.4 assists, shooting 45.9% on three-pointers. He had his first start at international club level during the 2017–18 EuroCup, and played a total of 7 games in the competition.

In the 2018–19 season Krämer played consistently with ratiopharm Ulm, and only appeared in one game with OrangeAcademy. In the 2018–19 Basketball Bundesliga Krämer posted averages of 5.4 points, 1.4 rebounds and 0.5 assists per game over 35 appearances (2 starts), playing 12.9 minutes per game (his career high in the competition); he also played 15 games (3 starts) in the 2018–19 EuroCup, and averaged 6.4 points, 1.8 rebounds and 0.5 assists in 13.4 minutes.

=== Northern Arizona Suns (2019–2020) ===
Krämer had attracted the attention of NBA scouts by 2019, and he was invited to a pro day in Los Angeles in late May 2019. After a good performance, he took part in pre-draft workouts in the weeks leading to the 2019 NBA draft, where he went undrafted. The Phoenix Suns offered him a spot on their Summer League team, and Krämer played 3 games (2 starts) during the 2019 NBA Summer League in Las Vegas, averaging 8 points, 2.3 rebounds and 0.7 assists in 14.3 minutes per game. On July 24, Krämer signed an Exhibit 10 contract with the Suns; he was released on October 15, 2019, together with Norense Odiase and Tariq Owens.

Later in October 2019, Krämer joined the Northern Arizona Suns, the Phoenix Suns' NBA G League affiliate team, together with Odiase and Owens. Krämer played 15 games during the 2019–20 NBA G League season, averaging 8.2 points, 3.1 rebounds, 0.5 assists and 0.5 steals in 14.5 minutes of average playing time; he shot 44.7% from the field and 31.2% on three-pointers. On March 7, 2020, Krämer scored a season-high 26 points against the Rio Grande Valley Vipers, shooting 10 for 18 from the field.

On February 10, 2021, Krämer was included in the roster of the Austin Spurs, but was later waived by the Spurs on February 12 without appearing in a game with the team.

=== Bayern München (2021) ===
Krämer was picked up by FC Bayern München on February 23, 2021. In Bundesliga play, he saw action in 18 games, averaging 2.6 points per contest.

=== Basketball Löwen Braunschweig (2021–2023) ===
He signed a two-year deal with Bundesliga side Basketball Löwen Braunschweig in July 2021.

=== Granada (2023–2024) ===
On June 23, 2023, he signed with Granada of the Liga ACB.

=== Tenerife (2024–2025) ===
On July 3, 2024, he signed with La Laguna Tenerife of the Spanish Liga ACB.

=== Real Madrid (2025–2026) ===
On July 11, 2025, he signed with Real Madrid of the Liga ACB. He was part of Real Madrid's 12-man roster in the 2026 Euroleague Final Four, but didn't play in either match as Real Madrid lost the final, 92-85 to Olympiacos.

=== Crvena zvezda (2026–present) ===
On July 15, 2026, Krämer parted ways with Real Madrid and officially signed with Serbian team Crvena zvezda of the EuroLeague, the ABA League, and the KLS.

== National team career ==
Krämer played several international games at youth level. He played with the Austrian U16 national team in 2013, but later decided to play for the German national team.

In December 2014 he made his debut with the German U18 national team, and he appeared with the team during the 2015 U18 European Championships, averaging 2.6 points, 0.9 rebounds and 0.5 assists per game. In 2016 he received his first call-up for the U20 team, and he later played during the 2017 FIBA U20 European Championship, recording averages of 12.3 points, 4.3 rebounds and 1.3 assists per game.

In December 2018 he was called up to play for the German senior national team and made his debut in a FIBA World Cup qualifier against Estonia played on December 3, scoring 7 points in 15 minutes.

On November 23, 2024, Krämer scored a career-high 43 points in an overtime loss against Sweden in the EuroBasket 2025 qualification. His performance was the second most points ever scored by a German national team player, trailing only Dirk Nowitzki's 47 points in the 2006 World Championship.
