= 2022–23 BBL-Pokal =

- Season: 2022–23
- Dates: 15 October 2022 – 19 February 2023
- Games played: 15
- Teams: 16

Regular season
- Season MVP: (United States) Nick Weiler-Babb

Finals
- Champions: Bayern Munich (4th title)
- Runners-up: Baskets Oldenburg

The 2022–23 BBL-Pokal was the 56th season of the BBL-Pokal, the domestic cup competition of the Basketball Bundesliga (BBL).

Bayern Munich defeated Baskets Oldenburg in the final for their fourth title.

== Participants ==
The sixteen highest placed teams from the 2021–22 Basketball Bundesliga, without the relegated teams and promoted teams, qualified for the tournament.

== Standings ==
| Pos | Team | Pld | W | L | PF | PA | PD | PCT | Qualification |
|---|---|---|---|---|---|---|---|---|---|
| 1 | Alba Berlin | 33 | 27 | 6 | 2872 | 2406 | +466 | .818 | Qualified |
| 2 | Telekom Baskets Bonn | 34 | 26 | 8 | 2989 | 2752 | +237 | .765 | Qualified |
| 3 | Bayern Munich | 34 | 25 | 9 | 2771 | 2515 | +256 | .735 | Qualified |
| 4 | Riesen Ludwigsburg | 34 | 23 | 11 | 2750 | 2608 | +142 | .676 | Qualified |
| 5 | ratiopharm Ulm | 34 | 22 | 12 | 2811 | 2709 | +102 | .647 | Qualified |
| 6 | Niners Chemnitz | 34 | 22 | 12 | 2757 | 2658 | +99 | .647 | Qualified |
| 7 | Hamburg Towers | 34 | 19 | 15 | 2897 | 2747 | +150 | .559 | Qualified |
| 8 | Brose Bamberg | 34 | 18 | 16 | 2858 | 2927 | −69 | .529 | Qualified |
| 9 | Crailsheim Merlins | 34 | 17 | 17 | 2875 | 2916 | −41 | .500 | Qualified |
| 10 | BG Göttingen | 34 | 16 | 18 | 2732 | 2803 | −71 | .471 | Qualified |
| 11 | Baskets Oldenburg | 34 | 14 | 20 | 2937 | 2948 | −11 | .412 | Qualified |
| 12 | s.Oliver Würzburg | 34 | 14 | 20 | 2810 | 2948 | −138 | .412 | Qualified |
| 13 | Basketball Löwen Braunschweig | 33 | 12 | 21 | 2743 | 2787 | −44 | .364 | Qualified |
| 14 | Medi Bayreuth | 34 | 11 | 23 | 2688 | 2908 | −220 | .324 | Qualified |
| 15 | MLP Academics Heidelberg | 34 | 11 | 23 | 2664 | 2860 | −196 | .324 | Qualified |
| 16 | Mitteldeutscher BC | 34 | 11 | 23 | 2840 | 3058 | −218 | .324 | Qualified |
| 17 | Skyliners Frankfurt | 34 | 9 | 25 | 2503 | 2707 | −204 | .265 | |
| 18 | Giessen 46ers | 34 | 8 | 26 | 2705 | 2945 | −240 | .235 | |

Source: BBL
Rules for classification: 1) Points; 2) Head-to-head; 3) Points difference; 4) Points scored.

== Round of 16 ==
The games took place between 15 and 17 October 2022.

15 October 2022
18:00

Boxscore

| Syntainics MBC | 69–75 | Medi Bayreuth |
Scoring by quarter: 24–17, 19–20, 14–13, 12–25
| Pts: Lamont Jones 19; Rebs: Martin Breunig 10; Asts: Lamont Jones 5 | | Pts: Ahmed Hill 20; Rebs: Bastian Doreth 7 Asts: Brandon Childress 5 |

Stadthalle Weißenfels, Weißenfels
Attendance: 2,000
Referees: Christof Madinger, Christian Theis, Moritz Krüper

15 October 2022
18:00

Boxscore

| Crailsheim Merlins | 86–72 | Niners Chemnitz |
Scoring by quarter: 21–19, 19–18, 25–12, 21–23
| Pts: Edon Maxhuni 20; Rebs: three players 6 Asts: Otis Livingston II 5 | | Pts: Mindaugas Sušinskas 18; Rebs: Miller, Velička 6 Asts: Arnas Velička 10 |

Arena Hohenlohe, Crailsheim
Attendance: 2,471
Referees: Moritz Reiter, Andreas Bohn, Benedikt Loder

15 October 2022
20:30

Boxscore

| s.Oliver Würzburg | 87–91 | Baskets Oldenburg |
Scoring by quarter: 17–25, 27–18, 17–20, 26–28
| Pts: C. J. Bryce 15; Rebs: Filip Stanić 6 Asts: C. J. Bryce 3 | | Pts: Tanner Leissner 24; Rebs: DeWayne Russell 6 Asts: DeWayne Russell 12 |

s.Oliver Arena, Würzburg
Attendance: 1,449
Referees: Carsten Straube, Johannes Hack, Enrico Streit

15 October 2022
20:30

Boxscore

| Hamburg Towers | 86–92 | MHP Riesen Ludwigsburg |
Scoring by quarter: 21–22, 23–21, 25–18, 17–31
| Pts: Lukas Meisner 19; Rebs: Yoeli Childs 10; Asts: three players 5 | | Pts: Isaiah Whitehead 21; Rebs: Yorman Polas Bartolo 14; Asts: Isaiah Whitehead 6 |

Edel-optics.de Arena, Hamburg
Attendance: 2,287
Referees: Robert Lottermoser, Steve Bittner, Tamer Arik

16 October 2022
15:00

Boxscore

| Löwen Braunschweig | 84–85 (OT) | MLP Academics Heidelberg |
Scoring by quarter: 23–22, 13–19, 14–21, 23–11, Overtime: 11–23
| Pts: David Krämer 17; Rebs: Nicholas Tischler 11; Asts: Robin Amaize 7 | | Pts: Max Ugrai 25; Rebs: Vincent Kesteloot 7 Asts: Eric Washington 6 |

Volkswagen Halle, Braunschweig
Attendance: 1,982
Referees: Zulifkar Oruzgani, Konstantin Simonow, Nermin Hodzic

16 October 2022
15:00

Boxscore

| BG Göttingen | 86–82 | ratiopharm Ulm |
Scoring by quarter: 16–21, 20–21, 23–31, 27–19
| Pts: Harald Frey 19; Rebs: Rayshaun Hammonds 7 Asts: Crandall, Smith 6 | | Pts: Karim Jallow 25; Rebs: Sagaba Konate 7 Asts: Yago dos Santos 6 |

Sparkassen Arena, Göttingen
Attendance: 2,003
Referees: Martin Matip, Nesa Kovacevic, Nicolas Brendel

16 October 2022
18:00

Boxscore

| Brose Bamberg | 68–85 | Bayern Munich |
Scoring by quarter: 18–21, 15–23, 16–21, 19–20
| Pts: Bohačík, Wright-Foreman 14; Rebs: Sengfelder, Wright-Foreman 6 Asts: Bell, Kariniauskas 4 | | Pts: Corey Walden 20; Rebs: Nick Weiler-Babb 6 Asts: Cassius Winston 5 |

Brose Arena, Bamberg
Attendance: 4,011
Referees: Gentian Cici, Benjamin Barth, Andreas Bohn

17 October 2022
19:00

Boxscore

| Alba Berlin | 98–95 | Telekom Baskets Bonn |
Scoring by quarter: 24–27, 21–22, 30–20, 23–26
| Pts: Blatt, Wetzell 23; Rebs: Louis Olinde 8 Asts: Luke Sikma 11 | | Pts: T. J. Shorts 36; Rebs: Kratzer, Shorts 7 Asts: Shorts 6 |

Mercedes-Benz Arena, Berlin
Attendance: 5,345
Referees: Carsten Straube, Armin Mutapcic, Tamer Arik

== Quarter-finals ==
The draw was held on 17 October 2022. The games took place on 3 and 4 December 2022.

3 December 2022
20:30

Boxscore

| Crailsheim Merlins | 69–95 | MHP Riesen Ludwigsburg |
Scoring by quarter: 21–29, 14–25, 8–25, 26–16
| Pts: Otis Livingston II 20; Rebs: Jaren Lewis 7 Asts: Myles Stephens 3 | | Pts: Isaiah Whitehead 18; Rebs: Eddy Edigin 6 Asts: Roberson, Whitehead 5 |

Arena Hohenlohe, Crailsheim
Attendance: 2,365
Referees: Anne Panther, Christof Madinger, Johannes Hack

4 December 2022
15:00

Boxscore

| Baskets Oldenburg | 85–83 | MLP Academics Heidelberg |
Scoring by quarter: 21–23, 18–29, 22–14, 24–17
| Pts: DeWayne Russell 28; Rebs: Trey Drechsel 7 Asts: Trey Drechsel 7 | | Pts: Eric Washington 21; Rebs: Eric Washington 8 Asts: Eric Washington 11 |

Große EWE Arena, Oldenburg
Attendance: 5,737
Referees: Robert Lottermoser, Martin Matip, Zulifkar Oruzgani

4 December 2022
18:00

Boxscore

| Bayern Munich | 80–63 | Medi Bayreuth |
Scoring by quarter: 13–14, 34–16, 13–14, 20–19
| Pts: Andreas Obst 16; Rebs: Bonga, Gillespie 8 Asts: Bonga, Walden 4 | | Pts: Jackson Rowe 18; Rebs: Brandon Childress 4 Asts: Doreth, Hill 2 |

Audi Dome, Munich
Attendance: 5,636
Referees: Moritz Reiter, Clemens Fritz, Benjamin Barth

4 December 2022
20:30

Boxscore

| BG Göttingen | 71–99 | Alba Berlin |
Scoring by quarter: 24–27, 22–24, 16–31, 9–17
| Pts: Geno Crandall 16; Rebs: Mark Smith 8 Asts: Harald Frey 5 | | Pts: Malte Delow 18; Rebs: Luke Sikma 11; Asts: Tamir Blatt 10 |

Sparkassen Arena, Göttingen
Attendance: 2,511
Referees: Gentian Cici, Carsten Straube, Oliver Krause

== Final four ==
The draw was held on 4 December 2022. The games took place on 18 and 19 February 2023.

=== Bracket ===
Semi-finals
18 February
Baskets Oldenburg | 92
Riesen Ludwigsburg | 86
18 February
Bayern Munich | 83
Alba Berlin | 77

Final
19 February
Baskets Oldenburg | 78
Bayern Munich | 90

=== Semi-finals ===
18 February 2023
16:00

Boxscore

| Baskets Oldenburg | 92–86 | Riesen Ludwigsburg |
Scoring by quarter: 23–28, 14–21, 29–20, 26–17
| Pts: DeWayne Russell 26; Rebs: Juiston, Pjanic 6 Asts: DeWayne Russell 8 | | Pts: Justin Johnson 19; Rebs: three players 5 Asts: Prentiss Hubb 9 |

Große EWE Arena, Oldenburg
Attendance: 6,200
Referees: Anne Panther, Martin Matip, Christof Madinger

18 February 2023
19:30

Boxscore

| Bayern Munich | 83–77 | Alba Berlin |
Scoring by quarter: 21–17, 19–21, 20–13, 23–26
| Pts: Cassius Winston 21; Rebs: Freddie Gillespie 11; Asts: Cassius Winston 4 | | Pts: Jaleen Smith 31; Rebs: Jaleen Smith 6 Asts: Johannes Thiemann 6 |

Große EWE Arena, Oldenburg
Attendance: 6,200
Referees: Robert Lottermoser, Gentian Cici, Clemens Fritz

=== Final ===
19 February 2023
15:00

Boxscore

| Baskets Oldenburg | 78–90 | Bayern Munich |
Scoring by quarter: 16–24, 19–19, 19–22, 24–25
| Pts: DeWayne Russell 28; Rebs: Trey Drechsel 8 Asts: DeWayne Russell 5 | | Pts: Lučić, Walden 18; Rebs: Freddie Gillespie 9 Asts: Corey Walden 4 |

Große EWE Arena, Oldenburg
Attendance: 6,200
Referees: Anne Panther, Robert Lottermoser, Christof Madinger
