= Louis Olinde =

German basketball player (born 1998)

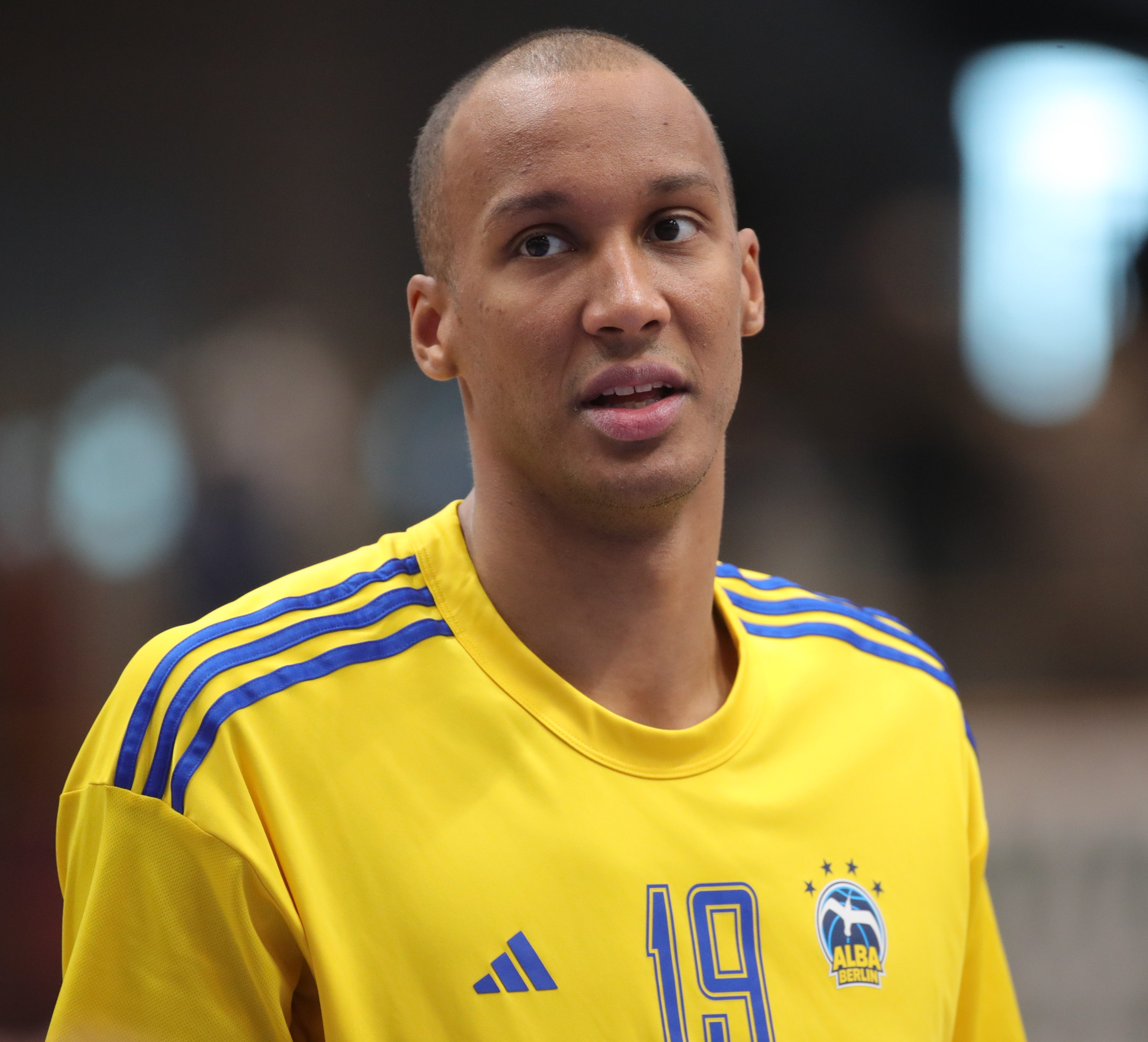
- Olinde with Alba Berlin in 2023

No. 19 – Reyer Venezia
- Position: Small forward / power forward
- League: Lega Basket Serie A EuroCup

Personal information
- Born: 19 March 1998 (age 28) Hamburg, Germany
- Listed height: 205 cm (6 ft 9 in)
- Listed weight: 180 lb (82 kg)

Career information
- Playing career: 2015–present

Career history
- 2015–2016: SC Rist Wedel
- 2015–2016: →Hamburg Towers
- 2016–2020: Brose Bamberg
- 2016–2019: →Baunach Young Pikes
- 2020–2025: Alba Berlin
- 2025–2026: Bàsquet Manresa
- 2026–present: Reyer Venezia

Career highlights
- 3× BBL champion (2017, 2021, 2022); 3× German Cup winner (2017, 2019, 2022); Albert Schweitzer Tournament winner (2016)

Louis Franklin Olinde (born 19 March 1998) is a German professional basketball player for Umana Reyer Venezia of the Italian Lega Basket Serie A (LBA) and the EuroCup. Standing at 205 cm (6 ft 9 in), Olinde plays at both the small forward and power forward positions.

His father Wilbert Olinde won the 1975 NCAA Men's Division I Basketball Tournament with UCLA and took his game to Germany following his collegiate career.

== Career ==
Olinde's career began in the youth ranks of BC Hamburg. He joined the Piraten Hamburg organization in 2011 to compete in the JBBL, Germany's under-16 division. In 2014, he made the Piraten under-19 side which plays in the NBBL, Germany's highest youth league.

Olinde earned a spot on the roster of SC Rist Wedel, a member of Germany's third-tier men's league ProB, for the 2014–15 season, but had to wait until the following campaign to see playing time. In accordance with an agreement of cooperation between SC Rist Wedel and Pro A side Hamburg Towers, Olinde was permitted to play for both clubs in the 2015–16 season, but primarily appeared in Pro B games for SC Rist. Still eligible to compete at the youth level that year, he also turned out for the Piraten Hamburg under 19 squad in 2015–16, and was selected for the 2016 NBBL All-Star Game.

In June 2016, he attended the NBA Top 100 camp in Charlottesville, Virginia. On 23 June 2016, Olinde signed a four-year deal with the Brose Bamberg of the German top-flight Basketball Bundesliga. He logged his first Bundesliga minutes in the season opener against Frankfurt on 23 September 2016. After having averaged 23 minutes, 6.8 points and 5.3 rebounds per game in the 2019–20 Bundesliga season, he signed a three-year deal with fellow Bundesliga side Alba Berlin in July 2020.

Olinde worked out for the Golden State Warriors, Oklahoma City Thunder and Portland Trail Blazers in the 2023 offseason. He signed another extension in 2023, committing himself to Alba until at least 2026.

He left Germany in the summer of 2025 to continue his playing career at Bàsquet Manresa of the Spanish Liga ACB. After a season spent in Spain, Olinde moved to Italy on 24 July 2026, signing a contract with Reyer Venezia.

== International career ==
In August 2014, Olinde made the roster of Germany's U16 Men's National Team for the European Championships in Latvia. In nine appearances, he averaged 3.9 points and 4.7 rebounds during the tournament.

In December 2015, he was named to the roster of Germany's U18 Men's National Team and helped the team win the 2016 Albert-Schweitzer-Tournament. He helped the German U18 squad to a fourth-place finish at the European Championship in December 2016, averaging 5.0 points and 5.2 rebounds a contest. Seeing action in all seven games during the 2017 FIBA Under-19 Basketball World Cup, Olinde posted 9.4 points and 5.3 rebounds a game en route to a fifth-place finish. He helped Germany win bronze at the 2018 FIBA Europe Under-20 Championship, averaging 7.3 points and 7.1 rebounds throughout the tournament.

== Career statistics ==
Legend
GP	Games played	GS	Games started	MPG	Minutes per game
FG%	Field-goal percentage	3P%	3-point field-goal percentage	FT%	Free-throw percentage
RPG	Rebounds per game	APG	Assists per game	SPG	Steals per game
BPG	Blocks per game	PPG	Points per game	PIR	Performance index rating
**Bold**	Career high

=== EuroLeague ===
Year	Team	GP	GS	MPG	FG%	3P%	FT%	RPG	APG	SPG	BPG	PPG	PIR
2016–17	Bamberg	1	0	8.0	.500	—	—	1.0	1.0	—	—	2.0	1.0
2017–18	Bamberg	15	2	7.6	.450	.125	**.867**	1.4	.3	.2	—	2.1	1.8
2020–21	Alba Berlin	25	6	16.0	.392	.357	.650	2.7	.2	.5	.2	4.3	3.0
2021–22	Alba Berlin	24	10	17.8	.450	.357	.852	3.6	.7	.3	**.4**	5.3	7.2
2022–23	Alba Berlin	**27**	**25**	**22.3**	.506	.391	.796	**4.3**	1.1	.6	.3	8.1	10.0
2023–24	Alba Berlin	17	13	22.0	**.529**	**.415**	.826	3.3	**1.4**	**1.1**	**.4**	**8.9**	**10.9**
Career		109	56	17.7	.473	.373	.799	3.2	.8	.5	.3	5.9	6.7

=== Basketball Champions League ===
Year	Team	GP	GS	MPG	FG%	3P%	FT%	RPG	APG	SPG	BPG	PPG
2018–19	Bamberg	**16**	8	17.0	**.396**	**.320**	**.774**	3.4	**.8**	.4	**.6**	4.4
2019–20	Bamberg	14	**14**	**23.2**	.282	.174	.700	**4.8**	**.8**	**.5**	**.6**	**5.5**
Career		30	22	20.0	.289	.225	.738	4.0	.8	.5	.6	4.9

=== Domestic leagues ===
Year	Team	League	GP	MPG	FG%	3P%	FT%	RPG	APG	SPG	BPG	PPG
2015–16	(Germany) Rist Wedel	ProB	19	20.2	.436	.130	.610	4.0	.9	.9	.2	6.1
2015–16	(Germany) Hamburg Towers	ProA	2	4.3	.500	.000	—	.5	1.0	1.0	—	2.0
2016–17	(Germany) Baunach	ProA	25	27.9	.424	.233	.759	5.7	1.6	.9	.4	7.8
2016–17	(Germany) Bamberg	BBL	15	5.5	.400	.400	.833	1.1	.1	.1	—	1.3
2017–18	(Germany) Baunach	ProA	15	29.9	.466	.333	.833	5.4	1.5	.9	1.1	15.4
2017–18	(Germany) Bamberg	BBL	28	7.6	.422	.375	.727	1.3	.2	.1	.1	2.7
2018–19	(Germany) Baunach	ProA	1	27.1	.500	.000	.667	5.0	—	—	2.0	12.0
2018–19	(Germany) Bamberg	BBL	30	13.9	.476	.333	.577	3.0	.9	.5	.2	3.6
2019–20	(Germany) Bamberg	BBL	21	23.3	.423	.328	.900	5.3	.9	.3	1.0	6.8
2020–21	(Germany) Alba Berlin	BBL	28	17.1	.446	.259	.851	3.5	.7	.7	.4	6.1
2021–22	(Germany) Alba Berlin	BBL	38	17.6	.493	.300	.826	3.8	.7	.7	.4	7.7
2022–23	(Germany) Alba Berlin	BBL	34	18.7	.531	.356	.754	3.4	1.1	.4	.7	7.8
2023–24	(Germany) Alba Berlin	BBL	27	18.0	.462	.364	.780	3.6	1.0	.8	.6	7.8
