= CJ Carr (basketball) =

American basketball player

Personal information
- Born: December 31, 1995 (age 30) Rock Island, Illinois, U.S.
- Listed height: 5 ft 8 in (1.73 m)
- Listed weight: 162 lb (73 kg)

Career information
- High school: Rock Island (Rock Island, Illinois)
- College: SIU Edwardsville (2014–2016); Missouri Southern (2016–2018)
- NBA draft: 2018: undrafted
- Playing career: 2018–2021
- Position: Point guard

Career history
- 2018–2019: BG Topstar Leitershofen
- 2020–2021: Fjölnir

Matthew Carr "CJ" Jr. (born December 31, 1995) is an American former professional basketball player. He played college basketball for the SIU Edwardsville Cougars and Missouri Southern Lions.

== Professional career ==
After going undrafted in the 2018 NBA draft, Carr signed with the German team BG Topstar Leitershofen of the 1. Regionalliga, the fourth tier basketball league in Germany. In his first professional game, he scored 30 points in an 80–83 loss to Rosenheim.

During the 2020–21 season, he played with Fjölnir of the Icelandic second-tier 1. deild karla. On March 12, 2021, he scored a career-high 42 points to go along with 14 assists in a 103–109 loss to the Breiðablik. For the season he averaged 29.2 points, 6.2 rebounds and 6.2 assists per game.

== Professional career statistics ==
Legend
GP	Games played	MPG	Minutes per game	FG%	Field goal percentage
3P%	3-point field goal percentage	FT%	Free throw percentage	RPG	Rebounds per game
APG	Assists per game	SPG	Steals per game	BPG	Blocks per game
PPG	Points per game	**Bold**	Career high		Led the league

Year	Team	League	GP	MPG	FG%	3P%	FT%	RPG	APG	SPG	BPG	PPG
2018–19	BG Topstar Leitershofen	1. Regionalliga	**24**	34.9	**.478**	**.396**	**.818**	4.8	4.2	2.5	**.2**	26.0
2020–21	Fjölnir	1. deild karla	18	**37.9**	.427	.333	.789	**6.2**	**6.4**	**3.9**	**.2**	**29.2**
Career		All Leagues	42	36.2	.454	.368	.804	5.4	5.2	3.1	.2	27.4
