= Emanuel Richter =

Slovenian basketball player

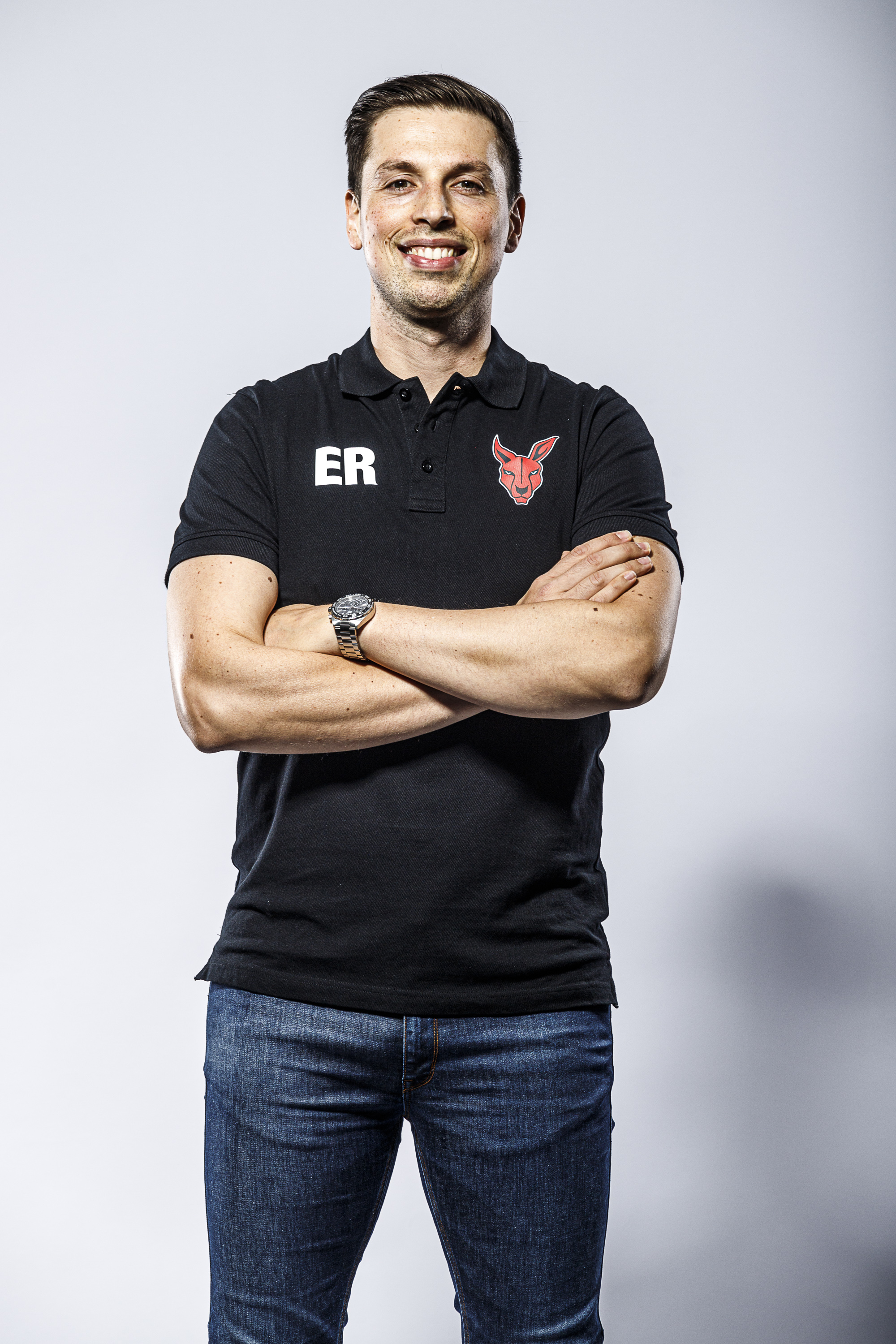
- BG Topstar Kangaroos Head Coach

Personal information
- Born: 29.11.1986 Koper, Slovenia

Career information
- Playing career: 2004–2020
- Number: 33
- Coaching career: 2020–present

Career history

Coaching
- BG Hessing Leitershofen

Emanuel Richter (born November 29, 1986, in Koper) also known as "Richie", is a Slovenian basketball coach and former professional basketball player. He is currently the Head Coach of the BG Hessing Kangaroos Leitershofen/Stadtbergen (Germany). In his career he played for: KK Luka Koper, KK Portorož, ASD Breg, Vanoli Cremona, Giants Nördlingen and BG Topstar Kangaroos Leitershofen/Stadtbergen.

Emanuel Richter won the 1. Regionalliga South/East Division with the BG Topstar Leitershofen, losing just one game in the whole 2021-22 season. With the title, the team got promoted in the 2. Bundesliga PRO B (Germany).
