= Kristian Kullamäe =

Estonian basketball player

No. 77 – U-BT Cluj-Napoca
- Position: Point guard / shooting guard
- League: Liga Națională; ABA League; EuroCup

Personal information
- Born: 25 May 1999 (age 27) Tallinn, Estonia
- Listed height: 1.94 m (6 ft 4 in)
- Listed weight: 85 kg (187 lb)

Career information
- Playing career: 2014–present

Career history
- 2014–2016: Audentes
- 2016–2018: Rockets Gotha
- 2018–2019: Baunach Young Pikes
- 2019–2020: Real Canoe
- 2020–2022: San Pablo Burgos
- 2020–2021: →Palma
- 2022–2023: Lietkabelis Panevėžys
- 2023–2025: Surne Bilbao Basket
- 2025–2026: Lietkabelis Panevėžys
- 2026–present: U-BT Cluj-Napoca

Career highlights
- FIBA Europe Cup champion (2025)
Medals
Men's basketball
Representing Estonia
FIBA Europe U-16 Championship Division B
Gold medal – first place	2015 Bulgaria	U16 Team
FIBA Europe U-18 Championship Division B
Bronze medal – third place	2017 Estonia	U18 Team

Kristian Kullamäe (born 25 May 1999) is an Estonian professional basketball player for U-BT Cluj-Napoca of the LNBM, the ABA League and the EuroCup. He also represents the Estonian national basketball team internationally. Standing at 1.94 m (6 ft 4 1/2 in), he plays at the point guard and shooting guard positions.

== Professional career ==
A native of Tallinn, Kullamäe started his career in 2014 in the ranks of Audentes, which at the time played in the Estonian first division Korvpalli Meistriliiga (KML). On 13 September 2016, Kullamäe signed with Rockets Gotha of the German second division ProA. After helping his team advance to the league finals, Kullamae made his debut in the top-tier Basketball Bundesliga (BBL) in the following 2017–2018 season. On 31 July 2018, Kullamäe returned to the ProA by signing with Baunach Young Pikes for the 2018–2019 season. On 11 July 2019, he signed with Real Canoe of the Spanish LEB Oro.

On 6 August 2020, Kullamäe signed a three-year contract with San Pablo Burgos of the Liga ACB. Under the terms of his contract, Kullamäe spent his first year playing on loan for Palma of the LEB Oro, where he was one of the leading players with 16.0 points per game. In the following season, he made his Liga ACB debut with Burgos, playing limited minutes. Kullamae chose to opt out of the final year of his contract after Burgos were relegated to LEB Oro for the 2022–23 season.

On 1 August 2022, Kullamäe signed with Lietkabelis Panevėžys of the Lithuanian Basketball League (LKL) and the EuroCup. On 30 November 2022, Kullamäe recorded 24 points (9/12 FG), six rebounds, seven assists and a 28-point PIR in a 104–98 home win over Cedevita Olimpija.

On 24 July 2025, Kullamäe for the second time in his career signed one–year contract with Lietkabelis Panevėžys of the Lithuanian Basketball League (LKL) and the EuroCup.

== National team career ==
Kullamäe made his debut for the Estonian national team on 25 February 2018, in a 2019 FIBA Basketball World Cup qualifier against Israel, scoring 8 points in a 78–62 home victory.

== Personal life ==
Kristian is the son of former Estonia international and current basketball coach, Gert Kullamäe.

== Career statistics ==
Legend
GP	Games played	GS	Games started	MPG	Minutes per game
FG%	Field-goal percentage	3P%	3-point field-goal percentage	FT%	Free-throw percentage
RPG	Rebounds per game	APG	Assists per game	SPG	Steals per game
BPG	Blocks per game	PPG	Points per game	PIR	Performance index rating
**Bold**	Career high

=== EuroCup ===
Year	Team	GP	GS	MPG	FG%	3P%	FT%	RPG	APG	SPG	BPG	PPG	PIR
2022–23	Lietkabelis Panevėžys	**19**	12	25.3	**.411**	.354	.720	**3.2**	**3.6**	**1.3**	**.4**	10.9	**10.2**
2025–26	Lietkabelis Panevėžys	18	**14**	**27.5**	.406	**.373**	**.800**	2.8	2.9	1.1	.1	**12.1**	8.0
Career		37	26	26.3	.408	.364	.750	3.0	3.3	1.2	.2	11.5	9.1

=== Domestic leagues ===
Season	Team	League	GP	MPG	FG%	3P%	FT%	RPG	APG	SPG	BPG	PPG
2014–15	Audentes	KML	8	13.3	.265	.235	1.000	2.4	1.4	.4	.1	3.4
2015–16	Audentes	KML	27	21.1	.406	.373	.818	2.7	2.2	1.0	.1	7.6
2016–17	Rockets Gotha	ProA	22	7.1	.459	.355	.882	.8	.5	.2	.0	3.7
2017–18	Rockets Gotha	BBL	12	10.1	.419	.417	.800	1.2	.8	.3	.0	3.3
2018–19	Baunach Young Pikes	ProA	29	26.3	.439	.319	.772	2.8	3.5	.6	.0	13.4
2019–20	Real Canoe	LEB Oro	22	22.4	.472	.368	.758	2.2	1.5	.6	.0	11.9
2020–21	Palma	LEB Oro	31	30.8	.408	.312	.889	3.3	2.3	1.6	.0	16.0
2021–22	San Pablo Burgos	Liga ACB	15	10.4	.365	.357	1.000	.9	1.1	.3	.0	3.3
2022–23	Lietkabelis Panevėžys	LKL	44	25.5	.525	.428	.725	3.0	3.5	1.1	.1	13.8
2023–24	Bilbao Basket	Liga ACB	5	18.2	.521	.458	1.000	1.8	1.2	.6	.0	13.2

=== National team ===
Team	Tournament	Pos.	GP	PPG	RPG	APG
Estonia	EuroBasket 2022	19th	5	7.0	2.8	4.6
Estonia	EuroBasket 2025	19th	5	13.8	3.8	5.2

=== Estonia national youth teams ===
Year	Tournament	National Team	GP	GS	MPG	FG%	3P%	FT%	RPG	APG	SPG	BPG	PPG
2014	2014 FIBA Europe Under-16 Championship Division B	Estonia U-16	9	6	23.6	.333	.267	.250	3.7	2.0	1.9	.2	9.0
2015	2015 FIBA Europe Under-16 Championship Division B	Estonia U-16	8	8	24.4	.402	.333	.667	4.9	3.6	1.4	.1	11.4
2016	2016 FIBA Europe Under-18 Championship Division B	Estonia U-18	8	-	28.9	.417	.286	.636	5.2	2.6	1.8	.2	17.6
2017	2017 FIBA U18 European Championship Division B	Estonia U-18	8	8	22.8	.400	.279	.882	3.6	4.3	1.1	.3	12.9
