= Andreas Obst =

German basketball player (born 1996)

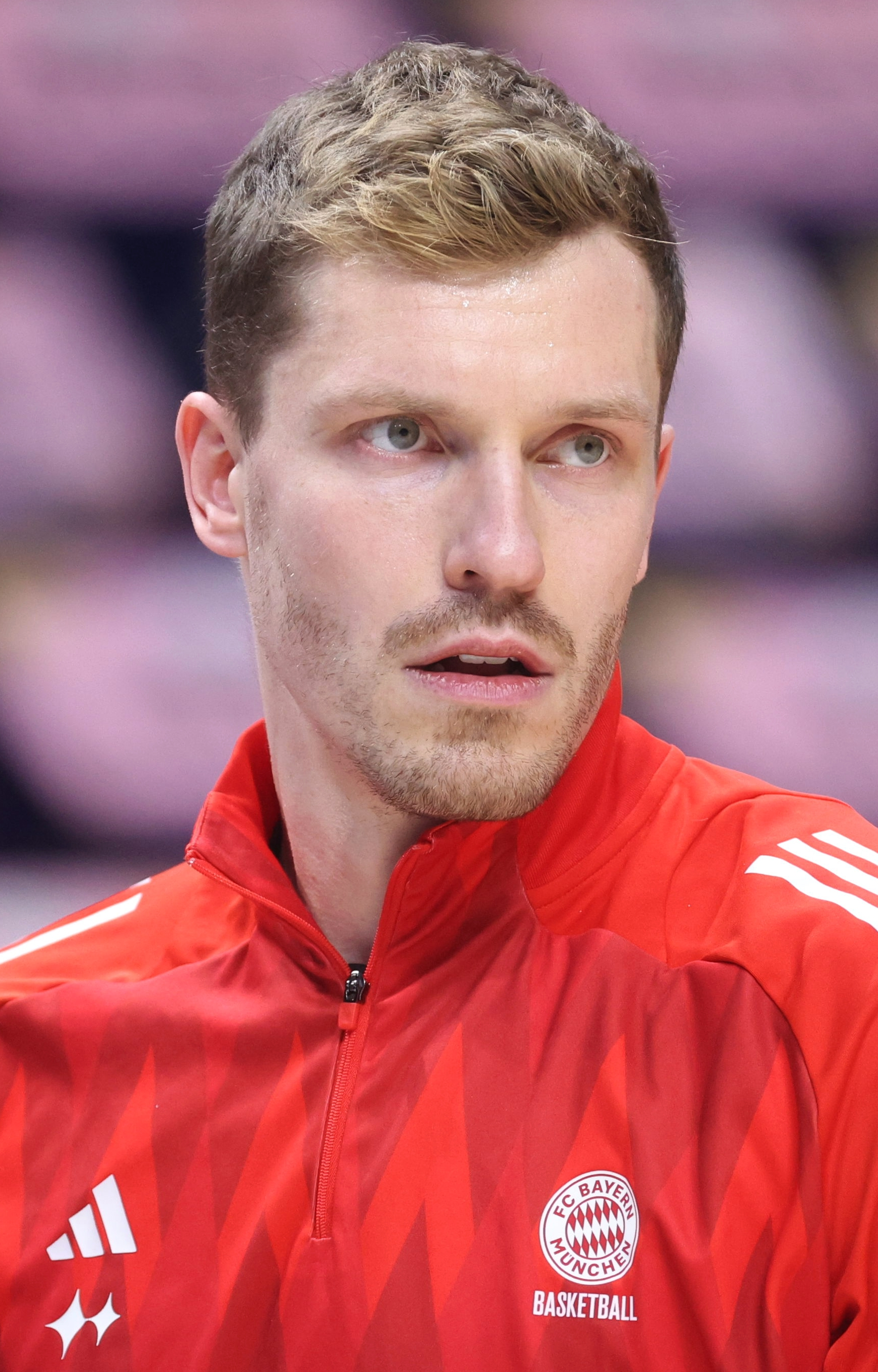
- Obst in 2025

No. 13 – Bayern Munich
- Position: Shooting guard
- League: BBL; EuroLeague

Personal information
- Born: 13 July 1996 (age 30) Halle, Germany
- Listed height: 191 cm (6 ft 3 in)
- Listed weight: 91 kg (201 lb)

Career information
- NBA draft: 2018: undrafted
- Playing career: 2014–present

Career history
- 2014–2017: Brose Bamberg
- 2016–2017: →Gießen 46ers
- 2017–2018: Rockets Gotha
- 2018–2019: Obradoiro CAB
- 2019–2021: ratiopharm Ulm
- 2021–present: Bayern Munich

Career highlights
- Bundesliga MVP (2026); BBL All-Star (2018); BBL champion (2016, 2024, 2025); German Cup winner (2023, 2024); EuroLeague records since the 2024–25 season: Most 3-point field goals made in a game
Medals
Men's basketball
Representing Germany
FIBA World Cup
Gold medal – first place	2023 Philippines–Japan–Indonesia
EuroBasket
Gold medal – first place	2025 Cyprus–Finland–Poland–Latvia
Bronze medal – third place	2022 Czech Republic–Georgia–Italy–Germany

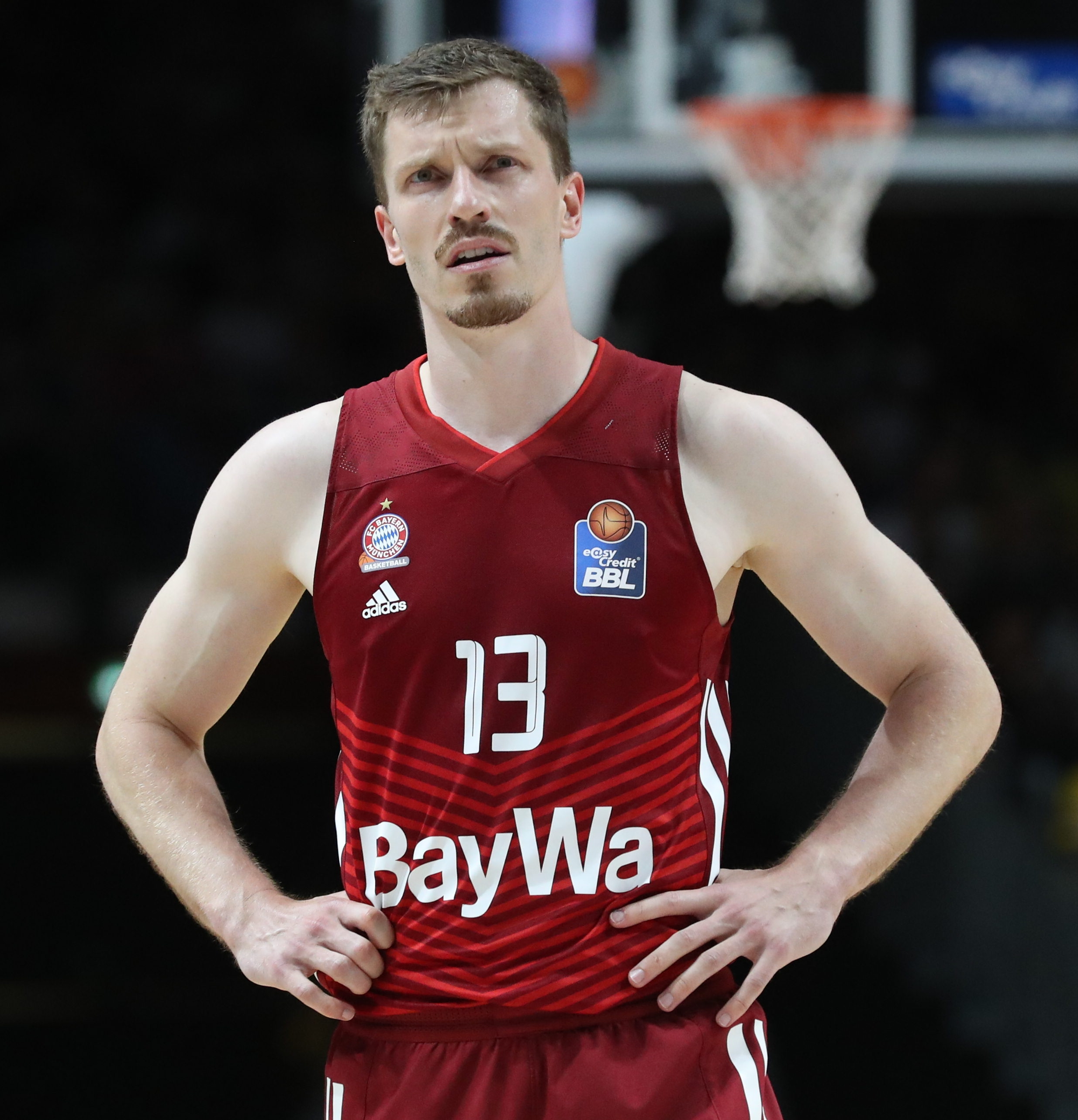
Obst in 2022

Andreas Obst (born 13 July 1996) is a German professional basketball player for Bayern Munich of the German Basketball Bundesliga (BBL) and the EuroLeague.

== Professional career ==
On 14 June 2016, Obst was sent on loan to Gießen 46ers by Brose Bamberg.

On 5 July 2017, he signed with Oettinger Rockets, newcomer in the first tier Basketball Bundesliga.

On 2 June 2018, he signed a three-year deal with Monbus Obradoiro of the Liga ACB.

On 1 July 2019, he signed a two-year deal with ratiopharm Ulm of the Basketball Bundesliga.

On 6 July 2021, he signed with Bayern Munich of the Basketball Bundesliga (BBL).

On 22 November 2024, in a game against FC Barcelona, Obst recorded 11 three-pointers and 1 free throw for a total of 34 points in a 100–78 win, breaking the record for the most three-pointers in a single EuroLeague game, which was previously held by Shane Larkin, Andrew Goudelock, and Marcus Eriksson at 10.

== International career ==
In 2016, Obst was selected for the German national basketball team, to play in the qualification rounds for the EuroBasket 2017. Obst also represented Germany in the EuroBasket 2022 and 2023 FIBA Basketball World Cup. Obst also played against USA Olympic Basketball Team in London Showcase games

== Career statistics ==
Legend
GP	Games played	GS	Games started	MPG	Minutes per game
FG%	Field-goal percentage	3P%	3-point field-goal percentage	FT%	Free-throw percentage
RPG	Rebounds per game	APG	Assists per game	SPG	Steals per game
BPG	Blocks per game	PPG	Points per game	PIR	Performance index rating
**Bold**	Career high

=== EuroLeague ===
Year	Team	GP	GS	MPG	FG%	3P%	FT%	RPG	APG	SPG	BPG	PPG	PIR
2021–22	Bayern Munich	31	3	7.0	.376	.362	.500	.4	.2	.1	—	2.9	0.7
2022–23	Bayern Munich	25	14	20.0	.412	.395	**1.000**	1.8	1.3	**.6**	**.1**	9.9	6.9
2023–24	Bayern Munich	22	3	18.7	.412	.409	.786	1.5	.7	.2	—	7.5	5.5
2024–25	Bayern Munich	**36**	**17**	**23.9**	**.420**	**.425**	.741	**1.9**	**1.5**	.5	—	**10.2**	**7.0**
Career		114	37	17.4	.405	.398	.741	1.4	.9	.4	.0	7.6	5.0

=== EuroCup ===
Year	Team	GP	GS	MPG	FG%	3P%	FT%	RPG	APG	SPG	BPG	PPG	PIR
2014–15	Bamberg	9	3	5.4	.300	.353	—	.2	.1	.2	—	2.0	0.6
2019–20	ratiopharm Ulm	**10**	**6**	**25.1**	.425	.420	**.944**	1.6	1.2	**.7**	—	10.6	6.8
2020–21	ratiopharm Ulm	**10**	1	23.2	**.466**	**.511**	.625	**2.3**	**2.2**	.6	**.1**	**11.0**	**8.6**
Career		29	10	18.4	.431	.446	.846	1.4	1.2	.5	—	8.1	5.5

=== Domestic leagues ===
Year	Team	League	GP	MPG	FG%	3P%	FT%	RPG	APG	SPG	BPG	PPG
2012–13	(Germany) Tröster	ProB	6	8.0	.368	.400	—	1.0	—	—	—	3.3
2014–15	(Germany) Baunach	ProA	10	19.9	.386	.400	1.000	1.5	1.0	1.0	.1	10.2
2014–15	(Germany) Bamberg	BBL	20	5.2	.387	.261	.667	.3	.5	.1	.0	1.7
2015–16	(Germany) Baunach	ProA	20	31.2	.386	.328	.828	2.8	2.5	1.1	.0	12.4
2015–16	(Germany) Bamberg	BBL	16	4.5	.304	.250	.500	.6	.1	—	.1	1.1
2016–17	(Germany) Giessen 46ers	BBL	28	16.2	.359	.303	.815	1.1	1.0	.1	.0	5.1
2017–18	(Germany) Rockets Gotha	BBL	32	27.8	.418	.381	.868	2.3	1.7	.5	—	10.9
2018–19	(Spain) Obradoiro	ACB	31	17.1	.423	.432	.909	1.3	1.3	.3	—	7.3
2019–20	(Germany) ratiopharm Ulm	BBL	28	23.8	.351	.321	.940	1.9	1.6	.5	.1	9.2
2020–21	(Germany) ratiopharm Ulm	BBL	41	24.9	.519	.498	.879	1.9	1.7	.6	—	13.6
2021–22	(Germany) Bayern Munich	BBL	43	19.5	.438	.426	.909	1.9	1.3	.3	—	9.8
2022–23	(Germany) Bayern Munich	BBL	31	21.0	.434	.396	.905	1.9	2.0	.7	.1	11.0
2023–24	(Germany) Bayern Munich	BBL	33	20.0	.445	.441	.878	1.6	1.7	.4	.0	9.1
2024–25	(Germany) Bayern Munich	BBL	43	25.2	.398	.376	.844	2.3	2.0	.8	.0	11.5
