= Jasper Günther =

German basketball player (born 1999)

No. 6 – RheinStars Köln
- Position: Point guard
- League: ProA

Personal information
- Born: 31 March 1999 (age 27) Herdecke, Germany
- Listed height: 1.81 m (5 ft 11 in)

Career information
- NBA draft: 2021: undrafted
- Playing career: 2017–present

Career history
- 2017–2019: Phoenix Hagen
- 2019–2025: Uni Baskets Münster
- 2025–present: RheinStars Köln

Jasper Bo Michel Günther (born 31 March 1999) is a German professional basketball player for RheinStars Köln of the German ProA league.

== Professional career ==
Jasper Günther moved from Hagen to Münster at the end of 2019.

As a leading player, Günther helped Münster to promote to the ProA after two and a half years in the ProB.

As of February 2023, he averaged 8.1 points and 4.4 assists per game.

On Juni 18, 2025, he signed with RheinStars Köln of the ProA.

== Personal ==
His brother Per Günther has also been a successful basketball player.
