= 2016–17 ProB =

ProB
- Season: 2016–17
- Teams: 24

Regular season
- Season MVP: (United States) Kerry Allen Carter
- Promoted: PS Karlsruhe Lions; Weißenhorn Youngstars
- Relegated: RSVE Stahnsdorf; Citybasket Recklinghausen; Uni-Riesen Leipzig; Giants Nördlingen

Finals
- Champions: Weißenhorn Youngstars; 1st title
- Runners-up: PS Karlsruhe Lions
- All statistics correct as of 23:54, 15 October 2016 (UTC).

The 2016–17 ProB was the 10th season of the ProB, the third level of basketball in Germany. The champions and finalists of the league are promoted to the 2017–18 ProA. Weißenhorn Youngstars won the title after defeating PS Karlsruhe Lions in the finals.

== Regular season ==
=== North ===
Pos	Team	Pld	W	L	GF	GA	GD	Pts	Promotion, qualification or relegation
1	SSV Lokomotive Bernau	6	5	1	516	433	+83	10	Playoffs
2	VfL AstroStars Bochum	6	4	2	474	420	+54	8	Playoffs
3	Iserlohn Kangaroos	6	4	2	482	434	+48	8	Playoffs
4	Artland Dragons	6	4	2	483	439	+44	8	Playoffs
5	Itzehoe Eagles	6	4	2	507	493	+14	8	Playoffs
6	Herzöge Wolfenbüttel	6	3	3	472	472	0	6	Playoffs
7	BAWE Oldenburger TB	6	3	3	463	482	−19	6	Playoffs
8	Rostock Seawolves	6	2	4	483	507	−24	4	Playoffs
9	SC Rist Wedel	6	2	4	474	503	−29	4	Relegation Round
10	Schalke 04	6	2	4	434	466	−32	4	Relegation Round
11	Citybasket Recklinghausen	6	2	4	452	505	−53	4	Relegation Round
12	RSV Eintracht Stahnsdorf	6	1	5	422	508	−86	2	Relegation Round

Updated to match(es) played on 30 October 2016. Source: Scoresway

=== South ===
Pos	Team	Pld	W	L	GF	GA	GD	Pts	Promotion, qualification or relegation
1	PS Karlsruhe Lions	6	5	1	453	403	+50	10	Playoffs
2	SV Oberelchingen	5	4	1	479	438	+41	8	Playoffs
3	Bayern Munich II	5	4	1	387	366	+21	8	Playoffs
4	Licher BasketBären	6	4	2	530	472	+58	8	Playoffs
5	Weißenhorn Youngstars	6	3	3	478	441	+37	6	Playoffs
6	Bayer Giants Leverkusen	6	3	3	543	519	+24	6	Playoffs
7	BG Karlsruhe	6	3	3	460	454	+6	6	Playoffs
8	Dragons Rhöndorf	6	3	3	472	468	+4	6	Playoffs
9	Giants Nördlingen	6	2	4	416	436	−20	4	Relegation Round
10	Skyliners Juniors	6	2	4	371	437	−66	4	Relegation Round
11	TG Würzburg	6	1	5	427	503	−76	2	Relegation Round
12	Uni-Riesen Leipzig	6	1	5	403	482	−79	2	Relegation Round

Updated to match(es) played on 30 October 2016. Source: Scoresway

== Playoffs ==
The champions and the runners-up of the playoffs would qualify for the 2017–18 ProA season.

Round of 16
Lok Bernau	75	61	88
Fraport Skyliners Juniors	64	76	59
Bayer Giants Leverkusen	77	88	80
VfL AstroStars Bochum	77	88	80
BAWE Oldenburger TB	66	85	68
BG Karlsruhe	67	70	79
Weißenhorn Youngstars	81	83
Rist Wedel	66	61
Scan Plus Elchingen	81	74	95
FC Schalke 04	66	76	65
Artland Dragons	83	69	72
TG Würzburg	71	81	76
Iserlohn Kanagaroos	77	80	74
Bayern Munich II	73	85	69
PS Karlsruhe Lions	107	77
Rostock Seawolves	105	65

Quarter-finals
Lok Bernau	66	76
VfL AstroStars Bochum	73	77
Weißenhorn Youngstars	71	63	76
BG Karlsruhe	66	83	59
Scan Plus Elchingen	81	71	83
TG Würzburg	66	76	66
PS Karlsruhe Lions	88	84
Iserlohn Kangaroos	67	75

Semi-finals
Weißenhorn Youngstars	74	79	81
VfL AstroStars Bochum	69	83	55
PS Karlsruhe Lions	66	77	92
Scan Plus Elchingen	55	78	75

Final
PS Karlsruhe Lions	71	71
Weißenhorn Youngstars	67	77

== See also ==
- 2016–17 Basketball Bundesliga
- 2016–17 ProA
