= RheinStars Köln =

- Leagues: ProA
- Founded: 1999; 27 years ago
- History: Cologne 99ers (1999–2001); RheinEnergie Köln (2001–2007); Köln 99ers (2007–2013); RheinStars Köln (2013–present)
- Arena: Motorworld Cologne
- Capacity: 1.700
- Location: Cologne, Germany
- Team colors: Red, White, Blue
- Head coach: Stephan Baeck
- Team captain: Rupert Hennen
- Championships: 1 German Championship; 3 German Cups; 1 BBL Champions Cup
- Website: rheinstars-koeln.de
Home	Away

RheinStars Köln is a professional basketball club based in Cologne, Germany. The team currently plays in the ProA, the second tier basketball league in Germany. The club has won one Basketball Bundesliga championship and three German Cup titles in its history.

== History ==
The team was founded 1999, as Cologne 99ers. In the Euroleague 2006-07 season, their home arena was an arena in Düsseldorf, Germany, named Philips Halle.

RheinEnergie power company supported the team until the summer of 2007, thus the team changed to its original name, Köln 99ers. On January 21, 2008, the club announced that they were insolvent.

In 2013, the club was re-launched and started in the 2.Regionliga (5th division) with the new name of RheinStars Köln. Since 2015, the team plays in the ProA, Germany's second division of professional basketball. In 2018-19 season, the team was relegated to the Regionalliga from ProB (Germany's 3rd division of professional basketball) after finishing the season 5-17.

== Honours ==
- German Champion: (1)
  - 2005–06
- German Cup: (3)
  - 2004, 2005, 2007
- BBL Champions Cup: (1)
  - 2006

== Players ==
=== Current roster ===
Note: Flags indicate national team eligibility at FIBA-sanctioned events. Players may hold other non-FIBA nationalities not displayed.

RheinStars Köln roster
Players
Coaches

Pos.	No.	Nat.	Name	Ht.		Age
PG	0	(United States)	Russell, Cedric (C)	1.88 m (6 ft 2 in)	86 kg (190 lb)	27 – 6 March 1999
PG	1	(United States)	Williams, Antonio	1.83 m (6 ft 0 in)	84 kg (185 lb)	29 – 12 January 1997
PF	2	(United States)	Monroe, Kris	2.03 m (6 ft 8 in)	107 kg (236 lb)	27 – 24 August 1999
PG	3	(Germany)	Trefzger, Ferdinand	1.87 m (6 ft 2 in)	67 kg (148 lb)	17 – 21 September 2009
SF	4	(United States)	Patterson, Biggie	2.01 m (6 ft 7 in)	93 kg (205 lb)	23 – 19 February 2003
PG	6	(Germany)	Günther, Jasper	1.81 m (5 ft 11 in)	75 kg (165 lb)	27 – 31 March 1999
SG	7	(Germany)	Lehmann, Konstantin	1.96 m (6 ft 5 in)	93 kg (205 lb)	18 – 1 June 2008
C	8	(Germany)	Diallo, Nat	2.08 m (6 ft 10 in)	106 kg (234 lb)	26 – 3 February 2000
PG	9	(Germany)	Begue, Maxi	1.94 m (6 ft 4 in)	92 kg (203 lb)	25 – 26 February 2001
SG	10	(Germany)	Hujic, Haris	1.93 m (6 ft 4 in)	90 kg (198 lb)	29 – 30 April 1997
PF	11	(Germany)	Bühner, Karl	2.01 m (6 ft 7 in)	103 kg (227 lb)	21 – 23 May 2005
C	14	(Germany)	Cuvalo, Marko	2.06 m (6 ft 9 in)	115 kg (254 lb)	18 – 14 January 2008
C	15	(Germany)	Rohwer, Björn	2.13 m (7 ft 0 in)	115 kg (254 lb)	31 – 22 August 1995
C	28	(Germany)	Otakho, Best	2.16 m (7 ft 1 in)	105 kg (231 lb)	25 – 28 February 2001

Head coach

- (Bosnia and Herzegovina) Zoran Kukić

Assistant coach(es)

- (Germany) Oliver Elling

Legend

- (C) Team captain
- Injured

- Roster
Updated: November 17, 2026

=== Notable players ===
Note: Flags indicate national team eligibility at FIBA-sanctioned events. Players may hold other non-FIBA nationalities not displayed.

Criteria

To appear in this section a player must have either:

- Set a club record or won an individual award while at the club
- Played at least one official international match for their national team at any time
- Played at least one official NBA match at any time.

- (Serbia) Saša Obradović
- (Poland) Marcin Gortat
- (Estonia) Janar Talts
- (United States) Immanuel McElroy
- (Germany) Philipp Schwethelm
- (Montenegro) Nikola Vučurović
- (Germany) Ademola Okulaja
- (United States) Demond Mallet
- (Germany) Tibor Pleiß
- (United States) Toby Bailey

== Season by season ==
Season	Tier	League	Pos.	Postseason	European competitions
2013–14	5	2.Regionliga	1	Promoted	–
2014–15	4	1.Regionliga	1	Promoted	–
2015–16	2	ProA	13	–	–
2016–17	2	ProA	8	Quarterfinalist	–
2017–18	2	ProA	4	Relegated	–
2018–19	3	ProB	22	Relegated	–
2019–20	4	1.Regionliga, West Zone	1	Promoted	–
2020–21	3	ProB, North Zone	9	–	–
2021–22	3	ProB, North Zone	11	–	–
2022–23	3	ProB, North Zone	6	–	–
2023–24	3	ProB, North Zone	1	–	–
2024–25	3	ProB, North Zone	2	Promoted	–
2025–26	2	ProA			–

== Head coaches ==
- (Serbia) Svetislav Pešić (2001–02)
- (Germany) Stephan Baeck (2002)
- (Serbia) Saša Obradović (2005–08)
- (Bosnia and Herzegovina) Drasko Prodanovic
