= 2017–18 ProA =

ProA
- Season: 2017–18
- Games played: 260
- Teams: 16

Regular season
- Top seed: Rasta Vechta
- Promoted: Rasta Vechta; Crailsheim Merlins
- Relegated: Ehingen Urspring; OrangeAcademy

Finals
- Champions: Rasta Vechta; 2nd title
- Runners-up: Crailsheim Merlins

The 2017–18 ProA was the 11th season of the ProA, the second level of basketball in Germany. The champions and the runners-up of the play-offs are promoted to the 2018–19 Basketball Bundesliga.

== Regular season ==
=== Table ===
Pos	Team	Pld	W	L	PF	PA	PD	Pts	Promotion, qualification or relegation
1	Rasta Vechta	30	27	3	2550	2095	+455	54	Advance to play-offs
2	Crailsheim Merlins	30	27	3	2712	2220	+492	54	Advance to play-offs
3	MLP Academics Heidelberg	30	19	11	2298	2192	+106	38	Advance to play-offs
4	RheinStars Köln (Note: RheinStars Köln resigned its ProA position for the 2018–19 season.) (R)	30	19	11	2211	2133	+78	38	Advance to play-offs
5	PS Karlsruhe Lions	30	18	12	2433	2249	+184	36	Advance to play-offs
6	Römerstrom Gladiators Trier	30	17	13	2406	2348	+58	34	Advance to play-offs
7	Hebeisen White Wings Hanau	30	15	15	2261	2314	−53	30	Advance to play-offs
8	Phoenix Hagen	30	15	15	2408	2429	−21	30	Advance to play-offs
9	VfL Kirchheim Knights	30	15	15	2331	2336	−5	30	
10	Hamburg Towers	30	13	17	2260	2326	−66	26	
11	Niners Chemnitz	30	13	17	2322	2311	+11	26	
12	Nürnberg Falcons	30	11	19	2144	2291	−147	22	
13	Uni Baskets Paderborn	30	9	21	2121	2372	−251	18	
14	Baunach Young Pikes	30	8	22	2240	2444	−204	16	
15	Ehingen Urspring (R)	30	8	22	2274	2584	−310	16	Relegation to ProB
16	OrangeAcademy (R)	30	6	24	2121	2448	−327	12	Relegation to ProB

Source: ProA
(R) Relegated

== Play-offs ==
The quarter-finals and semi-finals were played in a best-of-five play-off format. The Finals are played in a two-legged series in which the team with the most aggregate points wins.

=== Bracket ===
Quarterfinals
1	Rasta Vechta	3
8	Phoenix Hagen	0
4	RheinStars Köln	0
5	PS Karlsruhe Lions	3
2	Crailsheim Merlins	3
7	White Wings Hanau	0
3	MLP Academics Heidelberg	2
6	Gladiators Trier	3

Semifinals
1	Rasta Vechta	3
5	PS Karlsruhe Lions	1
2	Crailsheim Merlins	3
6	Gladiators Trier	1

Finals
1	Rasta Vechta	165
2	Crailsheim Merlins	158

=== Quarterfinals ===
Team 1	Series	Team 2	1st leg	2nd leg	3rd leg	4th leg	5th leg
Rasta Vechta	3–0	Phoenix Hagen	104–76	86–79	93–75		
RheinStars Köln	0–3	PS Kalsruhe Lions	67–85	70–92	68–88		
MLP Academics Heidelberg	2–3	Römerstrom Gladiators Trier	86–83	70–83	91–80	88–89	65–69
Crailsheim Merlins	3–0	Hebeisen White Wings	87–71	107–82	99–75		

=== Semifinals ===
Team 1	Series	Team 2	1st leg	2nd leg	3rd leg	4th leg	5th leg
Rasta Vechta	3–1	PS Karlsruhe Lions	90–79	80–90	95–90	91–73	
Römerstrom Gladiators Trier	1–3	Crailsheim Merlins	83–87	90–103	67–82	75–97	

=== Finals ===
==== First leg ====
4 May 2018	Crailsheim Merlins	87–103	Rasta Vechta	Crailsheim, Germany
19:30 UTC+1	Scoring by quarter: 22–22, 19–22, 22–31, 24–28
	Pts: Sherman Gay 24; Rebs: Frank Turner 7 Asts: Frank Turner 6 PIR: Sherman Gay 27	Boxscore	Pts: Robin Christen 20; Rebs: Andrew Smith 6 Asts: Cristopher Carter 16; PIR: Christopher Carter 24	Arena: Arena Hohenlohe

==== Second leg ====
6 May 2018	Rasta Vechta	62–71 (165–158 agg.)	Crailsheim Merlins	Vechta, Germany
15:00 UTC+1	Scoring by quarter: 20–24, 17–20, 15–16, 10–11
	Pts: Philip Herkenhoff 16; Rebs: Seth Hinrichs 10; Asts: Cristopher Carter 4 PIR: Cristopher Carter 18	Boxscore	Pts: Konrad Wysocki 19; Rebs: Konrad Wysocki 21; Asts: Konrad Wysocki 3 PIR: Konrad Wysocki 39	Arena: Rasta Dome

== Final standings ==
Pos	Team	Pld	W	L	Qualification
1	Rasta Vechta (P)	39	34	5	Promotion to 2018–19 Basketball Bundesliga
2	Crailsheim Merlins (P)	39	34	5	Promotion to 2018–19 Basketball Bundesliga
3	PS Karlsruhe Lions	37	22	15	
4	Römerstrom Gladiators Trier	34	16	18	
5	MLP Academics Heidelberg	35	21	14	
6	RheinStars Köln	33	19	14	
7	Hebeisen White Wings	33	15	18	
8	Phoenix Hagen	33	15	18	
9	VfL Kirchheim Knights	30	15	15	
10	Hamburg Towers	30	13	17	
11	Niners Chemnitz	30	13	17	
12	Nürnberg Falcons	30	11	19	
13	Uni Baskets Paderborn	30	9	21	
14	Baunach Young Pikes	30	8	22	
15	Ehingen Urspring	30	8	22	Relegation to ProB
16	OrangeAcademy	30	6	24	Relegation to ProB

Source: Zweite Basketball Bundesliga
(P) Promoted

== See also ==
- 2017–18 Basketball Bundesliga
