= 1. Regionalliga =

1.Regionalliga
- Country: Germany
- Confederation: FIBA Europe (Europe)
- Divisions: 4 (North, South-East, South-West and West)
- Number of teams: 56 teams
- Level on pyramid: 4
- Promotion to: ProB
- Relegation to: 2. Regionalliga
- Current champions: TSV Neustadt temps Shooters (North); TG VR-Bank Würzburg Baskets (South-East); SEEBURGER College Wizards (South-West); ETB Miners (West) (2023–24)
- Website: rln-basketball.de/index.php/1-und-2-liga/1-rl-herren

The 1.Regionalliga is the fourth-tier level league of professional club basketball in Germany.

== Structure ==
The league comprises 56 teams, separated into a 4-divisional structure wherein each regional structure consist of 12 to 16 teams.

At the end of the league stage, the winning team of the playoffs in each division is eligible for promotion to the ProB, while the teams positioned in 9th place and lower fight in the play-downs to stay in the league. The bottom two placed teams of both divisions are relegated to the 2. Regionalliga.

== Current teams (2021–22) ==
North

Team	City or Locality
TSV Neustadt temps Shooters	Neustadt am Rübenberge
ASC 46 Göttingen	Göttingen
VfL Stade	Stade
TSV Bargteheide Bees	Bargteheide
Aschersleben Tigers BC	Aschersleben
TuS ADEMAX Red Devils Bramsche	Bramsche
Baskets Juniors TSG Westerstede	Westerstede
Oldenburger TB	Oldenburg
MTV/BG Wolfenbüttel	Wolfenbüttel
SG Braunschweig	Braunschweig
BBC Rendsburg Twisters	Rendsburg
WSG Königs Wusterhausen	Wusterhausen

South-East

Team	City or Locality
TG SPRINTIS Veitshöchheim	Veitshöchheim
TG VR-Bank Würzburg Baskets Akademie	Würzburg
Culture City Weimar / Jena 2	Weimar
Dresden Titans 2	Dresden
Aschaffenburg Baskets	Aschaffenburg
TTL Basketball Bamberg	Bamberg
NINERS Chemnitz 2	Chemnitz
Regnitztal Baskets	Strullendorf
Haching Baskets	Unterhaching
TSV 1861 Nördlingen	Nördlingen
hapa Ansbach	Ansbach
Baskets Vilsbiburg	Vilsbiburg
TS Jahn München	Munich
ONLINEPRINTERS Neustadt a.d. Aisch	Neustadt an der Aisch
MTSV Schwabing Basketball	Munich
VfL Treuchtlingen	Treuchtlingen

South-West

Team	City or Locality
SEEBURGER College Wizards	Karlsruhe
ROTH Energie Gießen Pointers	Giessen
TV Langen	Langen
Lich Basketball	Lich
MTV Stuttgart	Stuttgart
Sunkings Saarlouis	Saarlouis
BBU 01 Ulm	Neu-Ulm
TSG Solcom Ravens Reutlingen	Reutlingen
KKK Haiterbach	Haiterbach
SG Mannheim	Mannheim
TuS Makkabi Frankfurt	Frankfurt am Main
vamos! TSG Söflingen	Ulm
Bona Baskets Limburg	Limburg an der Lahn
SV 03 Tigers Tübingen	Tübingen
TG Hanau	Hanau

West

Team	City or Locality
ETB Miners	Essen
BBA Hagen (BG Hagen)	Hagen
ACCENT BASKETS Salzkotten	Salzkotten
Hertener Löwen	Herten
BSV Münsterland Baskets Wulfen	Dorsten
DTV Basketball Köln	Cologne
TuS 59 HammStars	Hamm
SV Haspe 70	Hagen
TSV Bayer 04 Leverkusen 2	Leverkusen
NEW Elephants Grevenbroich	Grevenbroich
UBC Münster 2	Münster
Citybasket Recklinghausen	Recklinghausen
Telekom Baskets Bonn 2	Bonn
