= Jonathon Williams =

American basketball player

Free agent
- Position: Small forward
- League: Dutch Basketball League

Personal information
- Born: April 16, 1990 (age 36) Richmond, California
- Listed height: 6 ft 6 in (1.98 m)
- Listed weight: 225 lb (102 kg)

Career information
- High school: John F. Kennedy (Richmond, California)
- College: CC of San Francisco (2009–2011); Wagner (2011–2013)
- NBA draft: 2013: undrafted
- Playing career: 2014–present

Career history
- 2014–2015: Itzehoe Eagles
- 2015–2016: Hamburg Towers
- 2016–2017: Kirchheim Knights
- 2017–2018: Hamburg Towers
- 2018–2019: Heroes Den Bosch
- 2021: Heroes Den Bosch

Career highlights
- All-DBL Team (2019); ProA scoring champion (2017)

Jonathon Williams (born April 16, 1990) is an American basketball player, with a height of 6 ft 6 in (1.98 m). He plays as small forward or power forward.

== Professional career ==
On July 5, 2014, Williams signed his first professional contract with Itzehoe Eagles of the 1.Regionalliga, the German fourth division.

Williams played for Hamburg Towers in the German second tier ProA in the 2015–16 season, as he averaged 12.7 points and 5.5 rebounds. In 2016, he transferred to Kirchheim Knights. With Kirchheim, Williams was the leading scorer of the 2016–17 ProA season, averaging 18.8 points per game.

On July 3, 2018, Williams signed with New Heroes Den Bosch of the Dutch Basketball League (DBL) and FIBA Europe Cup.

On February 28, 2021, Williams signed with Heroes Den Bosch for a second stint.
