= Retin Obasohan =

Belgian basketball player (born 1993)

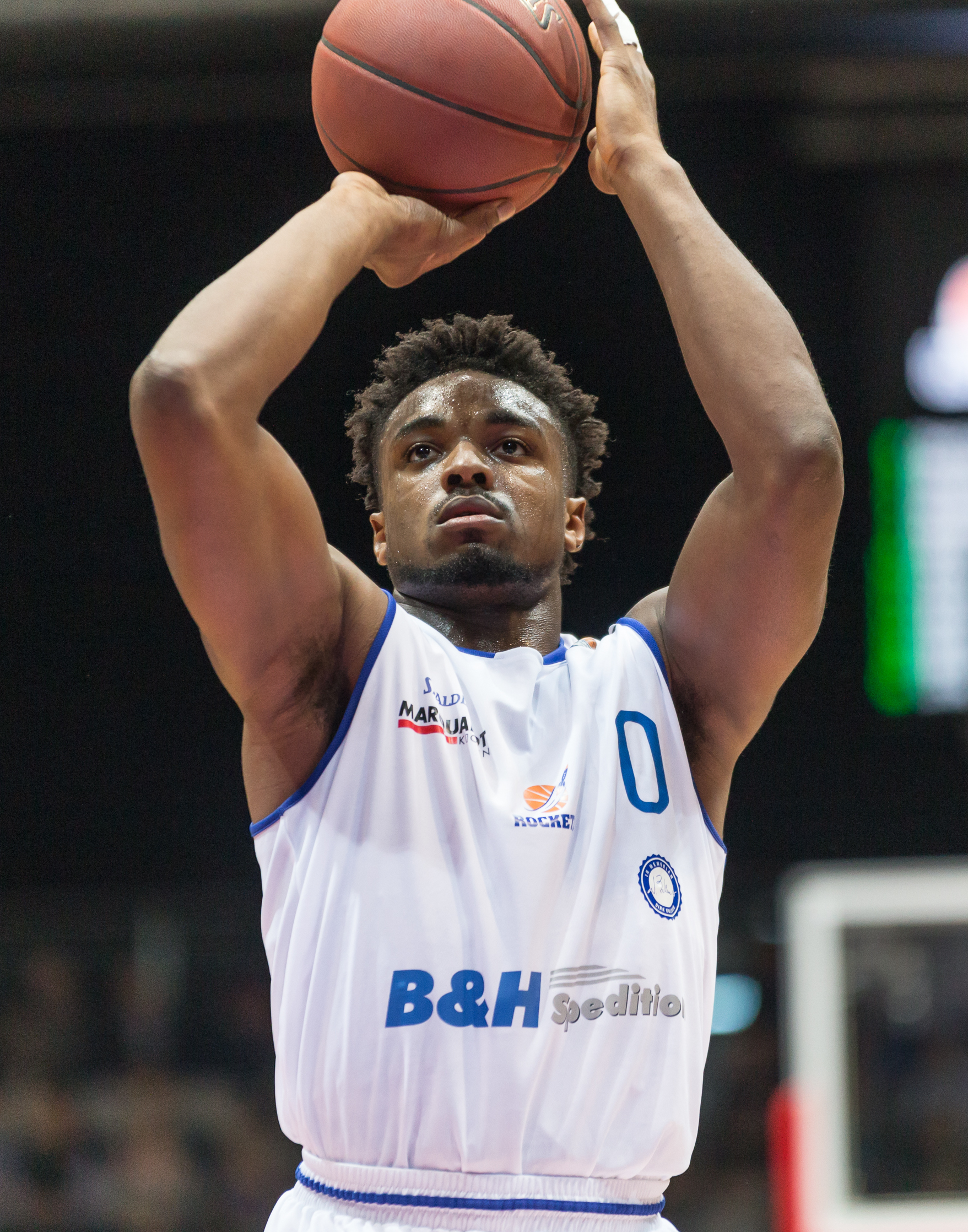
- Obasohan in action with Rockets Gotha in 2018

No. 32 – San Pablo Burgos
- Position: Point guard
- League: Liga ACB; EuroCup

Personal information
- Born: 6 July 1993 (age 33) Antwerp, Belgium
- Listed height: 1.88 m (6 ft 2 in)
- Listed weight: 95 kg (209 lb)

Career information
- College: Alabama (2012–2016)
- NBA draft: 2016: undrafted
- Playing career: 2016–present

Career history
- 2016–2017: Sidigas Avellino
- 2017–2018: Rockets Gotha
- 2018–2019: Northern Arizona Suns
- 2019–2020: Brose Bamberg
- 2020–2021: Nymburk
- 2021–2022: Hapoel Jerusalem
- 2022–2023: ASVEL
- 2023–2024: Derthona Basket
- 2024–2026: Manresa
- 2026–present: San Pablo Burgos

Career highlights
- First-team All-SEC (2016); SEC All-Defensive team (2016); SEC Scholar-Athlete of the Year (2016)

Retin Obasohan (born 6 July 1993) is a Belgian professional basketball player who plays as a guard for Liga ACB club San Pablo Burgos and the Belgium national team.

== Early life ==
Obasohan was born in Belgium and is of Nigerian descent.

== Early career ==
In the 2010–11 season, Obasohan played for amateur team Kangoeroes Boom in the Belgian Second Division.

== College career ==
From 2011 through 2016, Obasohan played for the Alabama Crimson Tide. He redshirted the 2011 season and continued to gain more playing time throughout his career. In his redshirt senior season, Obasohan averaged 17.6 points per game for the team. He led his team to NCAA tournament contention and numerous upset victories, including several wins against AP ranked opponents and a win at LSU against that year's NBA first overall pick Ben Simmons. Upon conclusion of the 2016 season, Obasohan was named to the All-SEC First Team and was named SEC Scholar-Athlete of the Year as well.

== Professional career ==
Obasohan entered the 2016 NBA draft, but went undrafted. On 28 June he signed a free-agent contract with the Sacramento Kings, as he went on to play in the 2016 NBA Summer League.

On 5 August 2016 Obasohan signed with Sidigas Avellino of the Italian Lega Basket Serie A.

On 4 August 2017 Obasohan signed with Rockets Gotha, newcomer in the German Basketball Bundesliga. On 1 April 2018 he scored a season-high 25 points in a 98–90 win over Eisbären Bremerhaven.

In October 2018, Obasohan joined the Northern Arizona Suns of the NBA G League as a local tryout player.

During the 2019–20 season, Obasohan plays in Germany for Brose Bamberg in the Basketball Bundesliga. He averaged 8.4 points and 2.7 assists per game.

On 24 October 2020 he signed with ERA Nymburk in the Czech NBL.

On 1 July 2021 he signed with Hapoel Jerusalem of the Israeli Premier League.

On 8 July 2022 he signed a deal with ASVEL Basket of the French LNB Pro A.

On 14 July 2023 he signed with Derthona Basket of the Italian LBA.

On 16 July 2024 he signed a one-season deal with Manresa of the Spanish Liga ACB.

On 16 July 2026, he signed with San Pablo Burgos of the Liga ACB.

== College statistics ==
Year	Team	GP	GS	MPG	FG%	3P%	FT%	RPG	APG	SPG	BPG	PPG
2012-13	Alabama	31	1	13.0	.374	.286	.771	1.4	.7	.9	.3	3.9
2013-14	Alabama	30	20	28.7	.381	.246	.667	3.0	1.6	1.8	1.0	9.5
2014-15	Alabama	31	12	19.5	.447	.378	.606	2.9	.8	.9	.5	6.2
2015-16	Alabama	33	33	32.3	.471	.372	.699	3.8	2.6	1.4	.3	17.6
Career		125	66	23.5	.433	.335	.683	2.8	1.5	1.2	.5	9.4
