= Leon Kratzer =

German basketball player (born 1997)

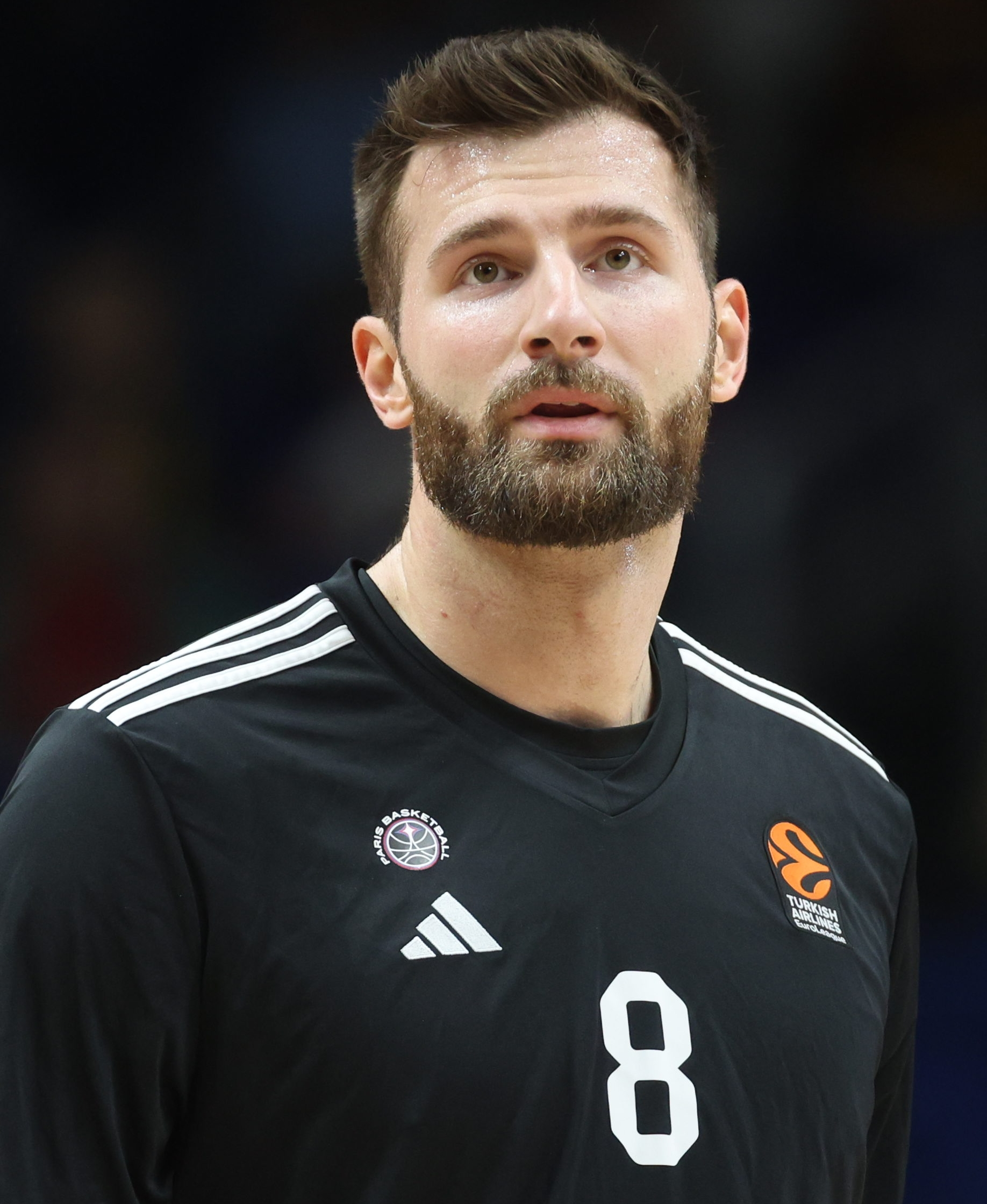
- Kratzer playing for Paris in 2024

No. 22 – Telekom Baskets Bonn
- Position: Center
- League: Basketball Bundesliga

Personal information
- Born: 4 February 1997 (age 29) Bayreuth, Germany
- Listed height: 2.11 m (6 ft 11 in)
- Listed weight: 111 kg (245 lb)

Career information
- Playing career: 2013–present

Career history
- 2013–2015: Baunach Young Pikes
- 2015–2018: Brose Bamberg
- 2015–2017: →Baunach Young Pikes
- 2017–2018: →s.Oliver Würzburg
- 2018–2020: Skyliners Frankfurt
- 2020–2023: Telekom Baskets Bonn
- 2023–2025: Paris Basketball
- 2025–2026: Bayern Munich
- 2026–present: Telekom Baskets Bonn

Career highlights
- EuroCup champion (2024); FIBA Champions League champion (2023); LNB Élite champion (2025); French Cup winner (2025); German Cup champion (2017); ProA Player of the Year (2017); ProA rebounding leader (2017)
Medals
Men's basketball
Representing Germany
EuroBasket
Gold medal – first place	2025 Cyprus–Finland–Poland–Latvia

Leon Kratzer (born 4 February 1997) is a German professional basketball player for Telekom Baskets Bonn of the German Basketball Bundesliga (BBL) and the Basketball Champions League.

== Professional career ==
The son of former professional basketball player Marc Suhr, a 7-foot center who won four caps for the German men's national team during his career, Kratzer started out with BBC Bayreuth’s youth team at age 12, moving on to the Brose Bamberg youth program in 2012. Representing Bamberg's development squad Baunach Young Pikes, he made his debut in Germany's third-tier ProB during the 2013-14 season, helping the team win promotion to ProA that year. Kratzer made his first appearances in Germany's top-flight Basketball Bundesliga for Bamberg in the 2016-17 campaign, while still being a regular in the reserve team. Averaging 14.6 points, 12.7 rebounds and 1.5 blocks a game for Baunach in 2016-17, he garnered ProA Player of the Year honors.

Looking to take the next step in his career and to gain more playing time in the Bundesliga, he signed on loan for s.Oliver Würzburg in June 2017.

On 20 November 2018 he signed with Skyliners Frankfurt of the Basketball Bundesliga.

On 31 July 2020 he signed with Telekom Baskets Bonn of the Basketball Bundesliga (BBL). In 2023 Kratzer won the Basketball Champions League with Bonn, remaining scoreless in the final against Hapoel Jerusalem, but contributing a team-high six rebounds.

On 8 July 2023 he signed with Paris Basketball of the LNB Pro A (BBL).

== International career ==
Kratzer represented the German junior national teams at the 2013 FIBA Europe Under-16 Championships, the 2015 FIBA Europe Under-18 Championships, 2016 FIBA Europe Under-20 Championships and 2017 FIBA Europe Under-20 Championships.
