= Itzehoe Eagles =

- Leagues: ProA
- Founded: 2015; 10 years ago
- History: SC Itzehoe ?–2015; Itzehoe Eagles; 2015–present
- Arena: Sportzentrum Am Lehmwohld
- Capacity: 714
- Location: Itzehoe, Germany
- President: Volker Hambrock
- Website: www.eagles-basketball.de

Itzehoe Eagles is a German basketball club, based in Itzehoe. The club currently plays in the ProB, the third tier of German basketball. Founded in 2015, the club plays its home games in the Sportzentrum Am Lehmwohld.

The club was part of the multi-sports club SC Itzehoe until 2015, when it separated from its mother club.

== Notable players ==
Note: Flags indicate national team eligibility at FIBA-sanctioned events. Players may hold other non-FIBA nationalities not displayed.

Criteria

To appear in this section a player must have either:

- Set a club record or won an individual award while at the club
- Played at least one official international match for their national team at any time
- Played at least one official NBA match at any time.

- (United States) Jonathon Williams
