= Arnoldas Kulboka =

Lithuanian basketball player (born 1998)

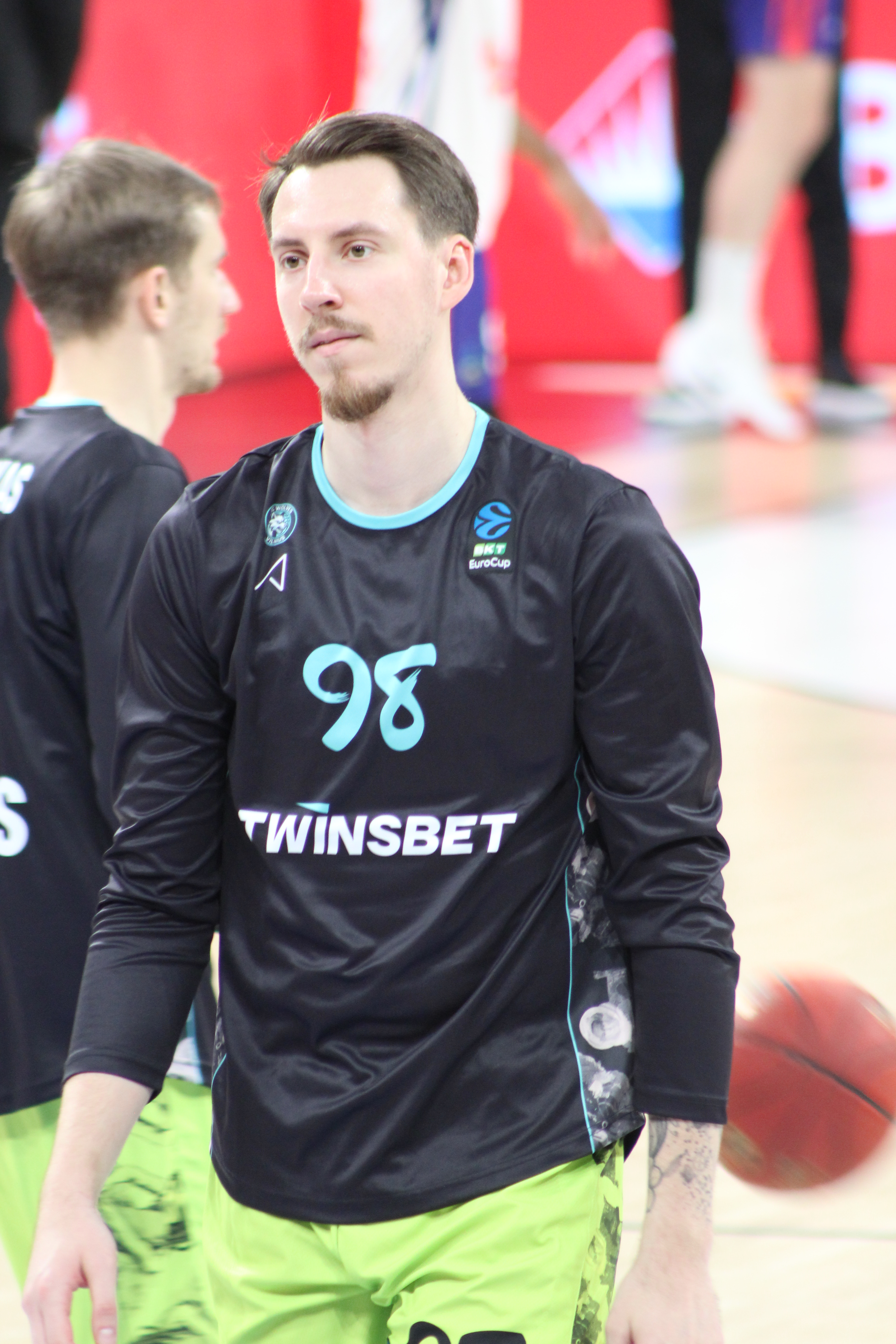
- Kulboka with Wolves in 2024

No. 98 – Promitheas Patras
- Position: Power forward / small forward
- League: Greek Basketball League

Personal information
- Born: 4 January 1998 (age 28) Marijampolė, Lithuania
- Listed height: 206 cm (6 ft 9 in)
- Listed weight: 104 kg (229 lb)

Career information
- NBA draft: 2018: 2nd round, 55th overall pick
- Drafted by: Charlotte Hornets
- Playing career: 2014–present

Career history
- 2014–2015: Žalgiris Kaunas
- 2014-2015: →Žalgiris-2 Kaunas
- 2015–2019: Brose Bamberg
- 2015–2017: →Baunach Young Pikes
- 2017–2018: →Orlandina
- 2019–2021: Bilbao
- 2021–2022: Charlotte Hornets
- 2021–2022: →Greensboro Swarm
- 2022–2023: Promitheas Patras
- 2023–2024: Prometey
- 2024–2025: Wolves Twinsbet
- 2025–2026: Aris Thessaloniki
- 2026–present: Promitheas Patras

Career highlights
- FIBA Champions League Best Young Player (2018); All-Spanish League Best Young Players Team (2020); Greek League All-Star (2022); German Cup winner (2019)
- Stats at NBA.com
- Stats at Basketball Reference
Medals
Men's basketball
Representing Lithuania
FIBA Europe Under-18 Championship
Silver medal – second place	2016 Turkey	U18 National Team
Bronze medal – third place	2015 Greece	U18 National Team

Arnoldas Kulboka (born 5 January 1998) is a Lithuanian professional basketball player for Promitheas Patras of the Greek Basketball League. He was selected by the Charlotte Hornets with the 55th overall pick in the 2018 NBA draft. At 2.06 m (6 ft 9 in), he can play at both forward positions.

== Professional career ==
=== Žalgiris-2 (2014–2015) ===
Kulboka played in the youth ranks of Žalgiris Kaunas with the club's reserve team, Žalgiris-2 Kaunas.

=== Brose Bamberg (2015–2017) ===
Kulboka signed a five-year deal with German powerhouse Brose Bamberg in August 2015. In his first year, he exclusively saw action on their affiliated teams in the German under-19 youth Bundesliga NBBL (TSV Breitengüßbach), and in the second German division 2. Bundesliga ProA (Baunach Young Pikes). He helped Breitengüßbach capture the 2016 NBBL title, while averaging 6.4 points, as well as 1.5 rebounds a contest for Baunach in ProA play. In 2016, he attended the Basketball Without Borders Global Camp in Toronto, Canada, as well as the Adidas Eurocamp in Treviso.

In the 2016–17 season, he improved his stats to 14.7 points, 4.3 rebounds and 2 assists per game for Baunach in ProA action. On 1 May 2017, Kulboka made his debut for Brose Bamberg in Germany's top-tier level Basketball Bundesliga, in a 61–74 win over Science City Jena, in which he recorded 13 points and 5 rebounds.

In June 2017, Kulboka participated in adidas Eurocamp. He was named best sniper of the camp, by scoring 10 three-pointers in a row. Furthermore, he was also named to the First Team All-Eurocamp 2017. During the same year, he declared for the 2017 NBA draft, but withdrew on 12 June.

=== Orlandina (2017–2018) ===
On 14 July 2017, Kubolka joined Orlandina Basket of the Italian top-tier level Serie A, on a loan. After averaging 10.3 points, 5 rebounds and 1.1 assists per game during the 2017–18 Basketball Champions League season, he was named the league's Best Young Player of the season.

=== Return to Bamberg (2018–2019) ===
On 23 July 2018, Brose Bamberg announced that Kulboka would return to the team.

=== Bilbao (2019–2021) ===
On 6 August 2019, Kulboka signed with Spanish club RETAbet Bilbao Basket. He averaged 8.5 points and 3.6 rebounds per game in his first season with the team. On June 12, 2020, Kulboka extended his contract for two seasons. In the summer of 2021, he left Bilbao after receiving an offer from the Charlotte Hornets.

=== Charlotte Hornets (2021–2022) ===
Near the end of the 2017–18 season, Kulboka would enter his name in the 2018 NBA draft, being one of only 11 international players to declare for the draft early that year. On 21 June 2018, he was drafted by the Charlotte Hornets, in the second round (55th overall). He represented Hornets during the 2018 NBA Summer League. During his debut game he scored 12 points per 13 minutes and helped his team to achieve an 88–87 victory over the Oklahoma City Thunder. Kulboka represented Hornets during the 2019 NBA Summer League once again. He played his best game versus the China men's national basketball team, scoring 18 points and grabbing 4 rebounds.

On 3 August 2021, the Charlotte Hornets signed Kulboka to a two-way contract for the 2021–22 season. Under the terms of the deal, he will split time between the Hornets and their NBA G League affiliate, the Greensboro Swarm.

On 11 December 2021, Kulboka debuted as a Charlotte Hornets member during an NBA game and played 3 minutes. He checked in one more time on 10 April 2022 for 3 minutes.

=== Promitheas Patras (2022–2023) ===
On 5 July 2022, Kulboka signed a one-year contract with Greek club Promitheas Patras. On 25 January 2023, Kulboka recorded a career-high 30 points (10/13 FG), four rebounds, three assists and 36-point PIR in an 81–72 home win over Budućnost VOLI.

In 27 domestic league matches, Kulboka averaged 12.1 points (shooting with 44% from the 3-point line) and 5.3 rebounds, playing around 28 minutes per contest. Additionally, in 20 EuroCup games, he averaged 14.7 points and 5.9 rebounds, playing around 31 minutes per contest.

=== Prometey (2023–2024) ===
On 21 July 2023, Kulboka signed with Prometey of the Latvian–Estonian Basketball League.

=== Wolves Twinsbet (2024–2025) ===
On 8 August 2024, Kulboka signed with Wolves Twinsbet of the Lithuanian Basketball League (LKL) and the EuroCup.

=== Aris Thessaloniki (2025–present) ===
On 15 July 2025, Kulboka signed with Aris Thessaloniki of the Greek Basketball League (GBL) and the EuroCup.

== National team career ==
At the junior youth levels, Kulboka has represented Lithuania on the international stage on several occasions, including at the 2014 FIBA Europe Under-16 Championship and the 2015 FIBA Europe Under-18 Championship. He scored a team-high 15.7 points a game in the 2016 FIBA Europe Under-18 Championship, en route to a silver medal. He also competed for Lithuania in the 2017 FIBA Under-19 Basketball World Cup, averaging a team-high 13.7 points per contest. On 26 February 2018, Kulboka debuted as a member of the senior Lithuanian national team, by scoring nine points, grabbing five rebounds and dishing out two assists, and helped to crush Kosovo's national team, by a score of 106–50, during the 2019 FIBA Basketball World Cup qualification.

== Career statistics ==
Legend
GP	Games played	GS	Games started	MPG	Minutes per game
FG%	Field goal percentage	3P%	3-point field goal percentage	FT%	Free throw percentage
RPG	Rebounds per game	APG	Assists per game	SPG	Steals per game
BPG	Blocks per game	PPG	Points per game	**Bold**	Career high

=== NBA ===
Year	Team	GP	GS	MPG	FG%	3P%	FT%	RPG	APG	SPG	BPG	PPG
2021–22	Charlotte	2	0	2.5	.000	.000	—	.0	.0	.0	.0	.0
Career		2	0	2.5	.000	.000	—	.0	.0	.0	.0	.0

=== EuroCup ===
Year	Team	GP	GS	MPG	FG%	3P%	FT%	RPG	APG	SPG	BPG	PPG	PIR
2022–23	Promitheas Patras	**20**	**19**	**30.3**	**.455**	**.430**	**.818**	**5.9**	**1.0**	**.6**	**.2**	**14.7**	**16.8**
Career		20	19	30.3	.455	.430	.818	5.9	1.0	.6	.2	14.7	16.8
