= OrangeAcademy =

- Nickname: Die Jungen Wilden
- Leagues: ProA
- Founded: 1994; 32 years ago
- History: Weißenhorn Youngstars (2012–2017); OrangeAcademy (2017–present)
- Arena: Dreifachturnhalle
- Capacity: 1,200
- Location: Weißenhorn, Germany
- Team colors: Orange, White, Black
- President: Andreas Oettel
- Head coach: vacant
- Affiliation: ratiopharm Ulm
- Championships: 1 ProB
- Website: orangeacademy.one
Home	Away

OrangeAcademy is a professional basketball club based in Weißenhorn, Germany. The team currently plays in the ProA, the second highest professional division in Germany. OrangeAcademy plays its home games at the Dreifachturnhalle, which has a capacity of 1,200 people.

The club serves as development team of the Basketball Bundesliga side Ratiopharm Ulm, which sends its young players to the team on loan.

== Honours ==
- ProB

Champions (1): 2016–17

== Season by season ==
Season	Tier	League	Pos.	Cup competitions	European competitions
2011–12	3	ProB	11th		
2012–13	3	ProB	3rd		
2013–14	3	ProB	10th		
2014–15	3	ProB	2nd		
2015–16	3	ProB	6th		
2016–17	3	ProB	1st		
2017–18	2	ProA	16th		

== Logos ==
Weißenhorn Youngstars logo (2012–2017)

== Notable players ==
Note: Flags indicate national team eligibility at FIBA-sanctioned events. Players may hold other non-FIBA nationalities not displayed.

Criteria

To appear in this section a player must have either:

- Set a club record or won an individual award while at the club
- Played at least one official international match for their national team at any time
- Played at least one official NBA match at any time.

- (Montenegro) Andrija Grbović
- (Norway) Kristian Sjolund
- (Poland) Igor Miličić Jr.
- (Poland) Jeremy Sochan
