= White Wings Hanau =

- Leagues: ProB
- Founded: 2013; 12 years ago
- History: White Wings Hanau (2013–present)
- Arena: Main-Kinzig-Halle
- Capacity: 1,564
- Location: Hanau, Germany
- Team colors: Black, White, Orange
- President: Sebastian Bartholomäus
- Website: www.hebeisen-whitewings.de
Home	Away

White Wings Hanau is a professional basketball club based in Hanau, Germany. The team currently plays in the ProB, the second highest professional division in Germany. The team plays its home games at the Main-Kinzig-Halle, which has a capacity of 1,564 people.
