= Baunach Young Pikes =

- Leagues: ProA
- Founded: 1976; 49 years ago
- History: 1. FC Baunach; 1976–2013; Bike-Café Messingschlager; 2013–2015; Baunach Young Pikes; 2015–present
- Arena: Graf-Stauffenberg-Halle
- Capacity: 1,500
- Location: Baunach, Germany
- Affiliation(s): Brose Bamberg
- Website: www.baunach-basketball.de
Home	Away

Baunach Young Pikes is a German professional basketball club, that is based in Baunach. It is the basketball section of the multi-sports club 1. FC Baunach. The team currently plays in the ProA, the German national second division.

The club has a cooperation agreement with Brose Bamberg of the Basketball Bundesliga, that regularly sends players on loan to the Baunach team.

== Season by season ==
Season	Tier	League	Pos.	Postseason
2011–12	4	1.Regionliga	4	Promotion playoffs
2012–13	4	1.Regionliga	1	Promoted
2013–14	3	ProB	8	Promoted (Runner-up)
2014–15	2	ProA	9	–
2015–16	2	ProA	9	–
2016–17	2	ProA	13	–

Source: Eurobasket.com

== Players ==
=== Notable players ===
Note: Flags indicate national team eligibility at FIBA-sanctioned events. Players may hold other non-FIBA nationalities not displayed.

Criteria

To appear in this section a player must have either:

- Set a club record or won an individual award while at the club
- Played at least one official international match for their national team at any time
- Played at least one official NBA match at any time.

- (Germany) Leon Kratzer
- (Germany) Malik Müller
- (Germany) Johannes Thiemann
- (Germany) Louis Olinde
- (Germany) Andreas Obst
- (Lithuania) Arnoldas Kulboka
- (Estonia) Henri Drell
- (Serbia) Aleksej Nikolić
- (Australia) William McDowell-White
- (Estonia) Kristian Kullamäe
