= Rockets (Germany) =

BiG Rockets Gotha
- Founded: 2 July 1998; 27 years ago
- Arena: Turnhalle KGS Gotha
- Capacity: 500
- Location: Gotha, Germany
- Team colors: Blue, White
- President: Andy Dittmar
- Head coach: Kemal Velishaev
- Championships: 1 ProB
- Website: www.big-gotha.de
| Home | Away |

Rockets is a German professional basketball team. It is originally based in Gotha, Germany, but plays its home games in Erfurt. The Rockets is the first team of the BiG Gotha basketball club.

In 2017, Rockets promoted to the Basketball Bundesliga (BBL), the German first tier. Following its debut season in the BBL, the professional team of Rockets was dissolved. Since 2018-19 season the team plays in the 2nd Regional League under the name BiG Rockets Gotha. On April 12, 2025 the team became champion of the 2nd Regional League and got promoted to the 4th tier 1st Regional League.

== History ==
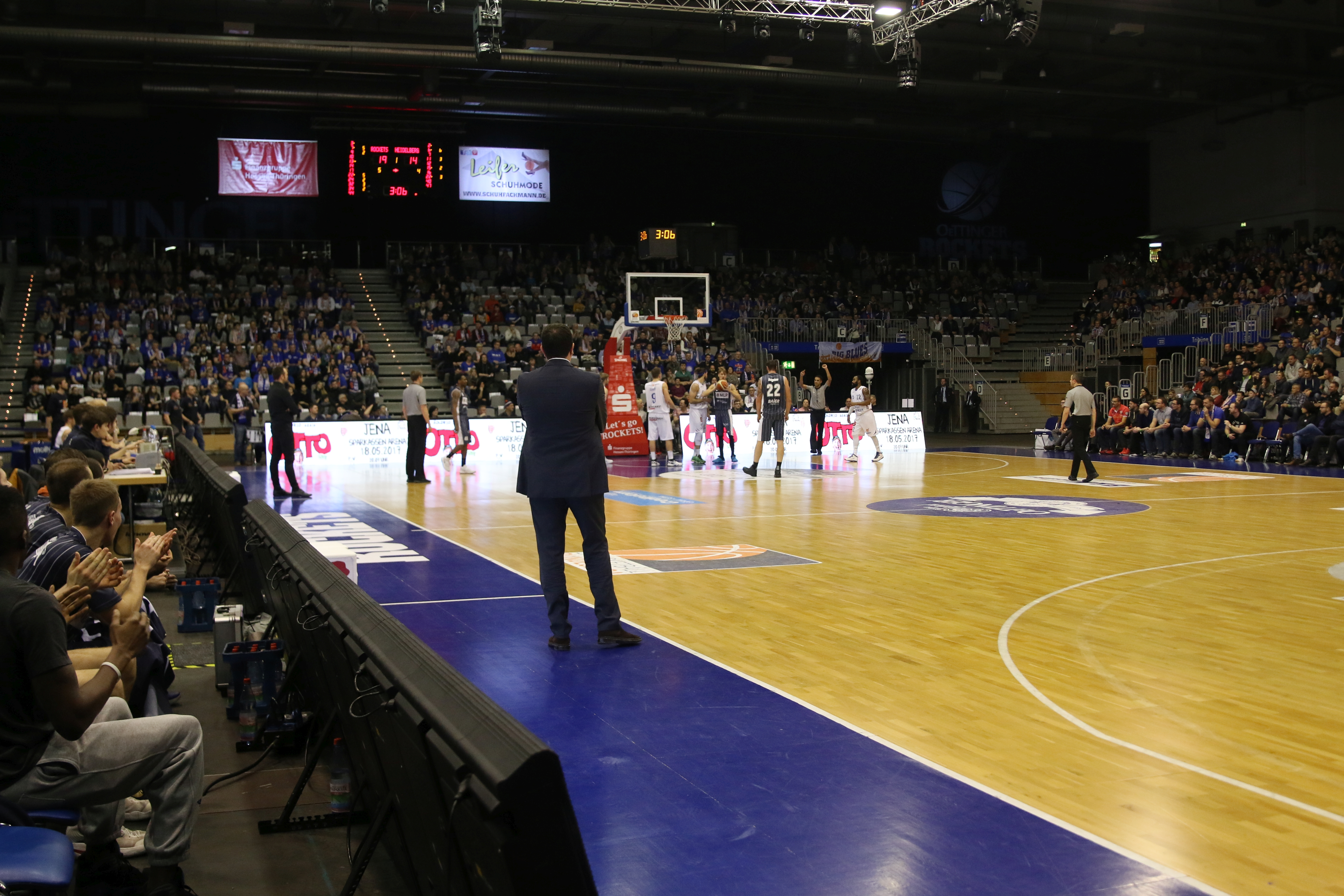
Oettinger Rockets home game in 2017

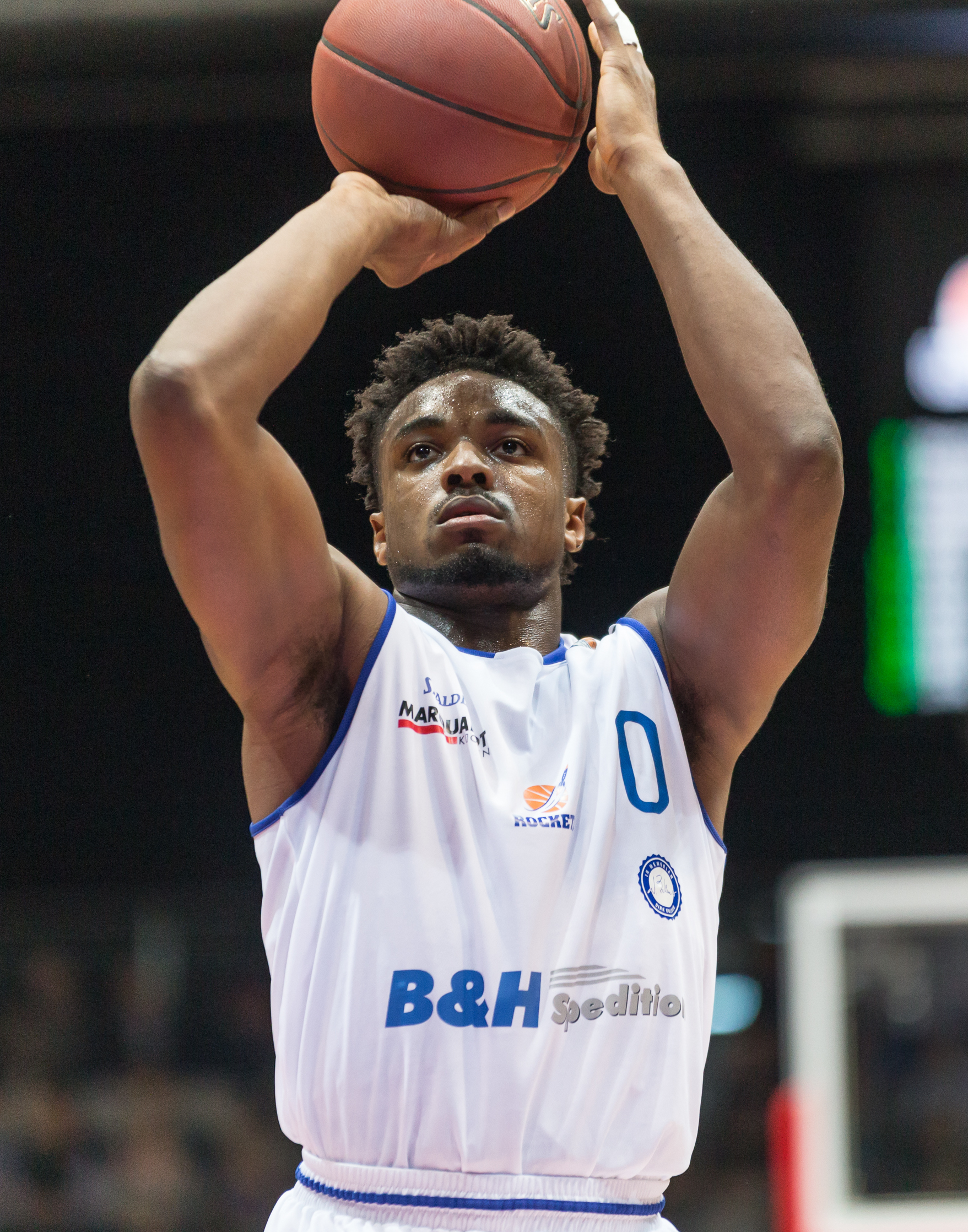
Retin Obasohan

The Oettinger Rockets were found as the first team of the club Gotha e.V. which was founded on 2 July 1998. The team started in the Bezirksliga and promoted to the fourth tier 1.Regionliga in 2005.

In the 2009–10 season, the Rockets was promoted to the national third level, the ProB. In the 2011–12 season, Gotha was crowned ProB champions and the team was promoted to the second tier level ProA.

Since the 2016–17 season, the Rockets play in the Messe Erfurt, which has a capacity of 3,236 people. On 3 May 2017, the team earned promotion to the Basketball Bundesliga by beating Niners Chemnitz in the semi-finals of the ProA to claim a promotion spot.

Rockets Gotha started the 2017–18 season as "Oettinger Rockets", named after its main sponsor Oettinger Brauerei. However, from January 2018 the main sponsor left and the club would be simply known as "Rockets". In its debut season in the BBL, Rockets ended in the 17th place and relegated back to the ProA. In July 2018, the organization announced that it was not able to play in the professional ProA league.

The same year the second team of Rockets managed to win the 1. Regional League South-East and promoted to the ProB. Due to loss of the main sponsor Oettinger Brauerei the team decided to sell their ProB licence to Basketball Löwen Erfurt and continue to compete in the 2nd Regional League under the name of BiG (Basketball in Gotha) Rockets Gotha.

== Honours ==
- ProB

Winners: 2011–12

- 2nd Regional League

Winners: 2024-25

== Players ==
=== Current roster ===
BiG Rockets Gotha roster
Players
Coaches

| Pos. | No. | Nat. | Name | Ht. | Age |
|---|---|---|---|---|---|
| PG | 5 | (Germany) | Deubner, Franz |
| PF | 6 | (Germany) | Schiller, Lorenz | 2.01 m (6 ft 7 in) | 26 – 5 April 2000 |
| F | 6 | (Germany) | Lenz, William Valentin | 1.94 m (6 ft 4 in) | 22 – 20 February 2004 |
| F/C | 7 | (Germany) | Enders, Jonas |
| C | 8 | (Germany) | Keßler, Simon |
| F | 9 | (Germany) | Pleta, Dominykas | 2.02 m (6 ft 8 in) | 21 – 6 October 2004 |
| SF | 10 | (Germany) | Hüller, Magnus | 1.96 m (6 ft 5 in) | 24 – 7 January 2002 |
| PF | 12 | (United States) | Franklin, Robert | 1.96 m (6 ft 5 in) | 45 – 20 January 1981 |
| F | 13 | (Germany) | Rösler, Tom | 1.98 m (6 ft 6 in) | 22 – 22 November 2003 |
| PF | 13 | (Germany) | Lechler, Adrian | 1.98 m (6 ft 6 in) | 23 – 1 July 2002 |
| C | 14 | (Germany) | Jäschke, Maximilian |
| PG | 15 | (Germany) | Arpasi, Moritz | 1.83 m (6 ft 0 in) | 22 – 24 March 2004 |
| SG | 17 | (Slovakia) | Kancír, Peter |
| SG | 47 | (Germany) | Wolter, Nils |

Head coach

- Vacant

Assistant coach(es)

- (Germany) Jannek Fritzschek

Legend

- (C) Team captain
- (DP) Development player
- Injured

- Roster
Updated: 4 October 2020

=== Notable players ===
Note: Flags indicate national team eligibility at FIBA-sanctioned events. Players may hold other non-FIBA nationalities not displayed.

Criteria

To appear in this section a player must have either:

- Set a club record or won an individual award while at the club
- Played at least one official international match for their national team at any time
- Played at least one official NBA match at any time.

- (Germany) Konstantin Klein
- (Germany) Andreas Obst
- (Nigeria) Ekenechukwu Ibekwe
- (Serbia) Nemanja Jaramaz
- (United States) David Hicks
- (United States) Darrel Mitchell
- (United States) Marcus Monk
- (United States) (Germany) (Israel) Travis Warech

== Head coaches ==
| Period | Coach |
|---|---|
| 2003–2007 | (Germany) Peter Krautwald |
| 2007–2009 | (Germany) Alexander Uth |
| 2009–12/2009 | (Lithuania) Dainius Pleta |
| 12/2009–2010 | (United States) Mike Smith |
| 2010–2011 | (Russia) Alexander Chartschenkow |
| 2011–11/2012 | (Switzerland) Marko Simić |
| 12/2012–2013 | (Germany) Christoph Nicol |
| 2013–2017 | (Germany) Chris Ensminger |
| 2017–2018 | (Germany) Ivan Pavić |
| 2018–10/2019 | (Germany) Valentino Lott |
| 10/2019–11/2019 | (Germany) Ronny Schönau/Peter Krautwald |
| 11/2019–03/2020 | (Spain) Iria Uxía Romarís Durán |
| 09/2020 | (Russia) (Germany) Kemal Velishaev |

== Season by season ==
| Season | Tier | League | Pos. |
|---|---|---|---|
| 2010–11 | 3 | ProB | 9th |
| 2011–12 | 3 | ProB | 1st |
| 2012–13 | 2 | ProA | 14th |
| 2013–14 | 2 | ProA | 7th |
| 2014–15 | 2 | ProA | 4th |
| 2015–16 | 2 | ProA | 3rd |
| 2016–17 | 2 | ProA | 2nd |
| 2017–18 | 1 | BBL | 17th |
| 2018-19 | 5 | 2nd Regional League | 7th |
| 2019-20 | 5 | 2nd Regional League | 8th |
| 2020-21 | 5 | 2nd Regional League | - |
| 2021-22 | 5 | 2nd Regional League | 10th |
| 2022-23 | 5 | 2nd Regional League | 5th |
| 2023-24 | 5 | 2nd Regional League | 2nd |
| 2024-25 | 5 | 2nd Regional League | 1st |
| 2025-26 | 4 | 1st Regional League | 12th |

Source: Eurobasket.com

== Sponsorship names ==
The logo of the Oettinger Rockets

Due to sponsorship reasons, the team has been known as:

- Oettinger Rockets (2006–2017)
