= ETB Schwarz-Weiß =

German basketball club

ETB Miners Essen
- Leagues: ProA
- Founded: 1960
- History: ETB Wohnbau Baskets (2006–2019); ETB Miners Essen (2019 – today)
- Arena: Sportpark am Hallo
- Capacity: 2,578
- Location: Essen, North Rhine-Westphalia, Germany
- Team colors: Black, White
- Head coach: Lars Wendt
- Championships: ProB 2 (2008, 2026)
- Website: www.miners.ruhr
Home	Away

ETB Schwarz-Weiß (known as ETB Miners Essen since 2019) is a professional basketball club based in Essen, Germany. ETB plays in the ProA and plays its home games in the Sportpark am Hallo.

== Players ==
=== Current roster ===
Note: Flags indicate national team eligibility at FIBA-sanctioned events. Players may hold other non-FIBA nationalities not displayed.

ETB Miners Essen roster
Players
Coaches

Pos.	No.	Nat.	Name
PG	0	(Germany)	Ronney, Ani	1.88 m (6 ft 2 in)	19 – 20 December 2006
PG	3	(United States)	Beard, Tre	1.80 m (5 ft 11 in)	25 – 9 November 2001
PG	4	(United States)	Lane, Quashawn	1.88 m (6 ft 2 in)	27 – 28 October 1999
C	5	(Germany)	Uzoma, Benjamin	2.10 m (6 ft 11 in)	28 – 3 November 1998
PF	6	(Germany)	Moller, Craig	2.03 m (6 ft 8 in)	32 – 22 August 1994
SG	10	(United States)	Sanders, Isaiah	1.94 m (6 ft 4 in)	26 – 23 March 2000
PF	12	(Germany)	Sperber, Niclas (C)	2.03 m (6 ft 8 in)	30 – 15 March 1996
SF	13	(United States)	Dawson, Darius	1.95 m (6 ft 5 in)	25 – 19 April 2001
PF	24	(United States)	Price-Townsend, Jackson	2.03 m (6 ft 8 in)	23 – 24 April 2003
C	26	(Germany)	Uzoma, Jonathan	2.08 m (6 ft 10 in)	27 – 24 August 1999
PG	30	(Germany)	Friederici, Marc	1.90 m (6 ft 3 in)	25 – 30 March 2001
PF	35	(Germany)	Mann, JJ	1.96 m (6 ft 5 in)	28 – 3 November 1998

Head coach

(Germany) Lars Wendt

Assistant coach(es)

(Germany) Marko Zarkovic

Legend

- (C) Team captain
- Injured

- Roster
Updated: November 13, 2026

== Overview of all seasons (since 2001) ==
Season	League	Position
2001/2002	2. Division (North)	10.
2002/2003	2. Division (North)	14.
2003/2004	2. Division (North)	8.
2004/2005	2. Division (North)	10.
2005/2006	2. Division (North)	16.
2006/2007	3. Division (now 4.)	1.
2007/2008	3. Division ProB	1.
2008/2009	2. Division ProA	13.
2009/2010	2. Division ProA	14.
2010/2011	2. Division ProA	9.
2011/2012	2. Division ProA	7.
2012/2013	2. Division ProA	12.
2013/2014	2. Division ProA	8.
2014/2015	2. Division ProA	7.
2015/2016	2. Division ProA	14.
2016/2017	2. Division ProA	15.
2017/2018	3. Division ProB	10.
2018/2019	3. Division ProB	12.
2019/2020	4. Division	14.
2020/2021	5. Division	/
2021/2022	4. Division	9.
2022/2023	4. Division	2.
2023/2024	4. Division	1.
2024/2025	3. Division ProB	

Info
Promoted / Relegated / Playoffs

=== Notable players ===
Note: Flags indicate national team eligibility at FIBA-sanctioned events. Players may hold other non-FIBA nationalities not displayed.

Criteria

To appear in this section a player must have either:

- Set a club record or won an individual award while at the club
- Played at least one official international match for their national team at any time
- Played at least one official NBA match at any time.

- (Bosnia and Herzegovina) Diego Kapelan
- (Canada) Tyler Kepkay
- (Netherlands) Nick Oudendag
- (Republic of Ireland) Colin O'Reilly
- (Peru) Daniel Daccarett
- (United States) Adrick Hills
- (United States) Jibril Hodges
- (United States) Morgan Lewis
- (United States) Patrick Flomo
- (Wales) Mike Gregory

== Honours ==
- ProB Champions (1): 2007–08
