= EWE Baskets Juniors =

- Leagues: ProB
- Founded: 1954; 72 years ago
- History: Oldenburger TB (1954–2019); EWE Baskets Juniors (2019–present)
- Arena: OTB Sporthalle
- Capacity: 560
- Location: Oldenburg, Germany
- Team colors: Yellow, Blue
- Affiliation: EWE Baskets Oldenburg
- Championships: 2 ProB
Home	Away

EWE Baskets Juniors, also Oldenburger TB, is a professional basketball team that is based in Oldenburg, Germany. The club's full name is Oldenburger Turnerbund. The team is a part of the bigger Basketball Bundesliga team EWE Baskets Oldenburg, and is used as a development team of EWE. The team cooperates with the Baskets Akademie Weser-Ems, which is the youth development academy of the Oldenburg professional team.

In the 2024–25 season, the EWE baskets juniors promoted back to the ProB from the regionalliga after defeating VFL Stade in the finals of the play-offs.

== Honours ==
- ProB

Winners (2): 2013–14, 2014–15

- Other

Holland Nordic Basketball Tournament U19 Winners (1):2026

== Season by season ==
Season	Tier	League	Pos.
2011–12	4	1.Regionliga	Champion
2012–13	3	ProB	4th
2013–14	3	ProB	Champion
2014–15	3	ProB	Champion
2015–16	3	ProB	5th
2016–17	3	ProB	3rd
2017–18	3	ProB	12th
2018–19	3	ProB	12rd
2019–20	3	ProB	11th
2020–21	4	1. Regionalliga Nord	4th
2021–22	4	1. Regionalliga Nord	7th
2022–23	4	1. Regionalliga Nord	9th
2023–24	4	1. Regionalliga Nord	7th
2024–25	4	1. Regionalliga Nord	Champion
2025–26	3	ProB	3rd

Source: Eurobasket.com
