= ProB =

Third-tier basketball league in Germany

- Founded: 2007; 19 years ago
- First season: 2007–08
- Country: Germany
- Confederation: FIBA Europe (Europe)
- Divisions: 2 (North and South)
- Number of teams: 26
- Level on pyramid: 3
- Promotion to: ProA
- Relegation to: 1. Regionalliga
- Current champions: ETB Miners Essen (1st title) (2025-26)
- Most championships: Giants Leverkusen (3 titles)
- Website: www.2basketballbundesliga.de

The ProB is the third-tier level league of professional club basketball in Germany. The league comprises 24 teams, separated into a Northern and a Southern Division. Officially, the ProB is part of the 2. Basketball Bundesliga, which consists of the two hierarchical leagues ProA and ProB. Before the 2007–08 season, the 2. Basketball Bundesliga was a basketball league with the same name, which consisted of two geographical divisions. At the end of the league stage, the winning team of the playoffs in each division, qualify for the ProA, and the teams positioned in 9th place and lower, fight in the play-downs, for the whereabouts in the league. The last two placed teams of both divisions are relegated to the lower level fourth-tier league (1.Regionalliga).

== Current teams (2025-26) ==
Clubs of the ProB 2025/26. Northern Division Southern Division

North

Team	City
Baskets Juniors TSG Westerstede	Oldenburg/Westerstede
BSW Sixers	Sandersdorf-Brehna
Dragons Rhöndorf	Bad Honnef
EN Baskets Schwelm	Schwelm
ETB Miners	Essen
Hertener Löwen	Herten
Iserlohn Kangaroos	Iserlohn
Itzehoe Eagles	Itzehoe
Lok Bernau	Bernau by Berlin
RASTA Vechta II	Vechta
SC Rist Wedel	Wedel
Seawolves Academy	Rostock
TKS 49ers	Stahnsdorf
TSV Neustadt temps Shooters	Neustadt am Rübenberge

South

Team	City
Ahorn Camp Baskets	Speyer
BBC Coburg	Coburg
BG Hessing Leitershofen	Stadtbergen
CATL Basketball Löwen	Erfurt
Dresden Titans	Dresden
FC Bayern Basketball II	Munich
OrangeAcademy	Neu-Ulm
Porsche BBA Ludwigsburg	Ludwigsburg
RheinStars Köln	Cologne
Skyliners Frankfurt Juniors	Frankfurt am Main
SV Fellbach Flashers	Fellbach
SV Oberhaching Tropics	Oberhaching
TV Langen	Langen
VR Bank Würzburg Baskets Akademie	Würzburg

== Champions ==
Season	Champion	Vice champion
2007–08	ETB Wohnbau Baskets Essen	Kirchheim Knights
2008–09	Crailsheim Merlins	Herzöge Wolfenbüttel
2009–10	Dragons Rhöndorf	Hertener Löwen
2010–11	Ehingen Urspring	BG Leitershofen/Stadtbergen
2011–12	Oettinger Rockets Gotha	Rasta Vechta
2012–13	Bayer Giants Leverkusen	Schwelmer Baskets
2013–14	Oldenburger TB	Baunach Young Pikes
2014–15	Oldenburger TB	Rist Wedel
2015–16	Ehingen Urspring	Skyliners Juniors
2016–17	Weißenhorn Youngstars	PS Karlsruhe Lions
2017–18	Elchingen	Rostock Seawolves
2018–19	Bayer Giants Leverkusen	WWU Baskets Muenster
2019–20	Season abandoned due to COVID-19 pandemic	
2020–21	Itzehoe Eagles / VfL SparkassenStars Bochum	
2021–22	Dresden Titans	ART Giants Düsseldorf
2022–23	EPG Baskets Koblenz	Rasta Vechta II
2023–24	Dragons Rhöndorf	RheinStars Köln
2024–25	Bayer Giants Leverkusen	SBB Baskets Wolmirstedt
2025-26	ETB Miners Essen	OrangeAcademy

=== Performances by club ===
Club	Winners	Runners-up	Years won	Years runner-up
Bayer Giants Leverkusen	3	0	2013, 2019, 2025	–
Oldenburger TB	2	0	2014, 2015	–
Ehingen Urspring	2	0	2011, 2016	–
Dragons Rhöndorf	2	0	2010, 2024	–
ETB Essen	2	0	2008, 2026	–
Elchingen	1	0	2018	–
Weißenhorn Youngstars	1	0	2017	–
Rockets Gotha	1	0	2012	–
Crailsheim Merlins	1	0	2009	–
Itzehoe Eagles	1	0	2021	–
VfL SparkassenStars Bochum	1	0	2021	–
Dresden Titans	1	0	2022	–
EPG Baskets Koblenz	1	0	2023	–

== See also ==
- ProA
- 2. Basketball Bundesliga
