= Germany men's national basketball team =

Men's national basketball team representing Germany

Germany
- FIBA ranking: 2 (1 September 2026)
- Joined FIBA: 1934
- FIBA zone: FIBA Europe
- National federation: Deutscher Basketball Bund (DBB)
- Coach: Álex Mumbrú
- Nickname: Die Mannschaft (The Team)

Olympic Games
- Appearances: 7
- Medals: None

FIBA World Cup
- Appearances: 7
- Medals: (gold) Gold: (2023); (bronze) Bronze: (2002)

EuroBasket
- Appearances: 26
- Medals: (gold) Gold: (1993, 2025); (silver) Silver: (2005); (bronze) Bronze: (2022)
- Retired numbers: 1 (14)
Home	Away

First international
- Switzerland 25–18 Germany (Berlin, Germany; 7 August 1936)

Biggest win
- West Germany 127–53 Scotland (Osnabrück, West Germany; 11 May 1989)

Biggest defeat
- Yugoslavia 115–56 West Germany (Tbilisi, Soviet Union; 4 June 1965)
Medal record
FIBA World Cup
Gold medal – first place	2023 Philippines–Japan–Indonesia
Bronze medal – third place	2002 United States
EuroBasket
Gold medal – first place	1993 Germany
Gold medal – first place	2025 Latvia
Silver medal – second place	2005 Serbia and Montenegro
Bronze medal – third place	2022 Germany
Stanković Cup
Silver medal – second place	2006 Nanjing

The Germany men's national basketball team (German: Deutsche Basketballnationalmannschaft or Die Mannschaft) represents Germany in international basketball competition. The team is directed by the German Basketball Federation (Deutscher Basketball Bund), the governing body for basketball in Germany. Currently, Germany is ranked second in the FIBA World Ranking.

Between 1949 and 1990, separate German national teams were recognised by FIBA due to Allied occupation. The DBB were representing the Federal Republic of Germany (named West Germany from 1949 to 1990), while the East Germany team represented the German Democratic Republic (1952–1990). The two would later merge, after reunification in 1990.

Germany's greatest achievements to date have been competing in 26 appearances at the EuroBasket, winning gold in 1993 and 2025, silver in 2005, and bronze in 2022. Germany have made seven appearances at the FIBA World Cup, winning gold in 2023, and bronze in 2002. At the Olympic Games, in Germany's seven appearances, their top performance is their fourth place finish in 2024.

== History ==
=== Early years (1934–1939) ===
Germany became members of FIBA in 1934. After declining to enter the first ever EuroBasket in 1935, the national team would make their debut presence on the international stage at the 1936 Olympic Games as hosts in Berlin. It was also the first basketball tournament held at the Olympics. American Mormon missionaries who played the sport helped coach the team to improve the church's relations with the Nazi Germany government.

Entering the competition, Germany played their first match against Switzerland, which the team would lose 25–18. The loss would send the team toward the consolation bracket to finish out the event. After the tournament, Germany failed to participate at the 1937 and 1939 editions of the EuroBasket, due to the continued rise of Nazi Germany during the late 1930s.

=== Post-war Germany (1946–1990) ===
Following World War II, along with Germany's involvement, the team was banned from participating in international competitions until 1950. The country was also split into West Germany and East Germany, after the end of Allied occupation in 1949. Also in 1949, in October of that year, the German Basketball Federation was founded. The East Germany national team eventually became members of FIBA in 1952.

At the end of their international suspension, West Germany entered the EuroBasket 1951 held in Paris. The team would open their stint at the tournament with two heavy losses, before earning their first ever victory in the competition against Scotland 25–69. With a record of (1–2) after the preliminary phase, West Germany could not advance, and were sent into the classification phase. There, the team lost four out of their five matches, with their only win coming against Portugal 47–39. West Germany would finish the event in 12th place in the then 18 team field.

Two years later, West Germany made their second appearance at the tournament for EuroBasket 1953 in Moscow. The team would once again complete the preliminary phase at a record of (1–2), this time with their lone victory against Sweden 37–65. Entering the classification rounds, West Germany would pick up two more wins, along with three more losses. At an overall record of (3–5), the team would finish out the competition in 14th place.

After subpar performances in their first two appearances at the top continental tournament, West Germany would only reach the competition four times (1955, 1957, 1961, 1965) in their next nine attempts over 16 years. The best result for the national team during that period, would be their 13th-place finish at the event in 1957.

West Germany made it back to the European Championship as hosts in 1971. The team ultimately went quietly at the event, as they were denied making it past the preliminary round once again. A year later, West Germany hosted the 1972 Olympic Games held in Munich. It was the second time the Olympic event was held on German soil. The team began the competition in Group B, where they would lose their first two matches, before defeating the Philippines 93–74. West Germany, however, would only go (2–2) in their next four games of the group stage, before being relegated to the classification bracket. There, they would lose two more games before being eliminated. After the Olympics, West Germany failed to qualify for a major international competition for the rest of the 1970s.

Nine years after West Germany played in their last international tournament, the team would qualify for the EuroBasket 1981. They would only prevail in one game in the group stage, a 66–51 win against Turkey and having to close out their tournament appearance in the classification phase. Two years later, the team made it back on to the continental stage at EuroBasket 1983. Led by a young core of players such as Detlef Schrempf, Uwe Blab and others, West Germany entered the competition placed in Group B. Behind posting a (2–2) record in their first four group stage matches, the team defeated Israel 77–70 in their final game of the round. However, finishing in a second place tie with the Netherlands, prevented the team from advancing; due to their loss against them earlier in the tournament.

In 1984, West Germany made their third appearance at the Olympic Games, after replacing the Soviet Union; who initiated a boycott on the event for political reasons. At the tournament, the team would make it to the quarter-finals of the competition for the first time, before succumbing to the eventual gold medalists United States (which featured a young Michael Jordan).

Behind the encouraging performance by the team at the prior Olympics, West Germany as hosts of EuroBasket 1985, looked to build on the momentum. The first game was against the Netherlands, where the team completely dominated from start to finish in a 104–79 win. At a record of (1–0), West Germany went on to split their next four games of the group stage to reach the quarter-finals. There, the team would come up short against Spain, to shift their focus to the classification rounds. West Germany won both of their matches in the phase, to complete a fifth-place finish at the event.

The ensuing year, West Germany competed at the 1986 FIBA World Cup, after gaining qualification through a European qualifying tournament. Making their first appearance at the competition, and without key players Detlef Schrempf and Uwe Blab due to NBA players being ineligible to participate in international competitions at the time, West Germany failed to make it out of the group stage. In 1987, West Germany would enter their last event during the 1980s. At EuroBasket 1987, the team only managed to procure slightly better results, as they were eliminated in the quarter-finals.

=== German reunification ===
After the fall of the Berlin Wall in 1989, and the reunification of Germany in 1990, a unified Germany national team qualified for its first tournament at the 1992 Olympic Games. With FIBA lifting their rule that prevented NBA players from competing in international competitions, veterans Detlef Schrempf and Uwe Blab were able to represent the national team for the first time since 1985.

Being placed in Group A at the competition, Germany earned their first victory against hosts Spain 83–74. After barely escaping with a win in their second game versus Angola 63–64, the team were up against the juggernauts of the event to that point in the United States. However, Germany was heavily defeated by the famed "Dream Team" 111–68. After the loss, the national team dropped their next two games of the group stage, but secured their spot into the quarter-finals. There, Germany lost against the Unified team representing the former Soviet Union 83–76, to finish out the tournament in the classification round.

At EuroBasket 1993, Germany entered the tournament as hosts. After Detlef Schrempf retired from international competition following the prior Olympics, expectations for the team heading toward the event were tempered. However, Germany quickly impressed, as they made it all the way to the quarter-finals to defeat Spain 77–79 in overtime to reach the semis for the first time. After a 76–73 win over Greece, the team was a win away from winning it all. In the final, Germany won their first European title 71–70 against Russia. Additionally, the steady play by Christian Welp during the event earned himself MVP. Following Germany's triumph, the FIBA World Cup in 1994, and the next two editions of the EuroBasket (1995, 1997), saw the team fail to make it past the group stage.

=== The Nowitzki era (1999–2015) ===
Prior to Germany's arrival at the EuroBasket in 1999, the team selected 21 year old prodigy Dirk Nowitzki of the Dallas Mavericks to represent the senior national team for the first time. In their opening game of the tournament, Nowitzki led Germany with 21 points and 5 rebounds, to narrowly defeat Greece 59–58. After a ten-point loss in their second game to Lithuania, the team got back on track with a 68–77 win versus the Czech Republic to enter the quarter-finals. However, Germany would lose in the round to FR Yugoslavia 78–68, to finish the competition in the classification phase.

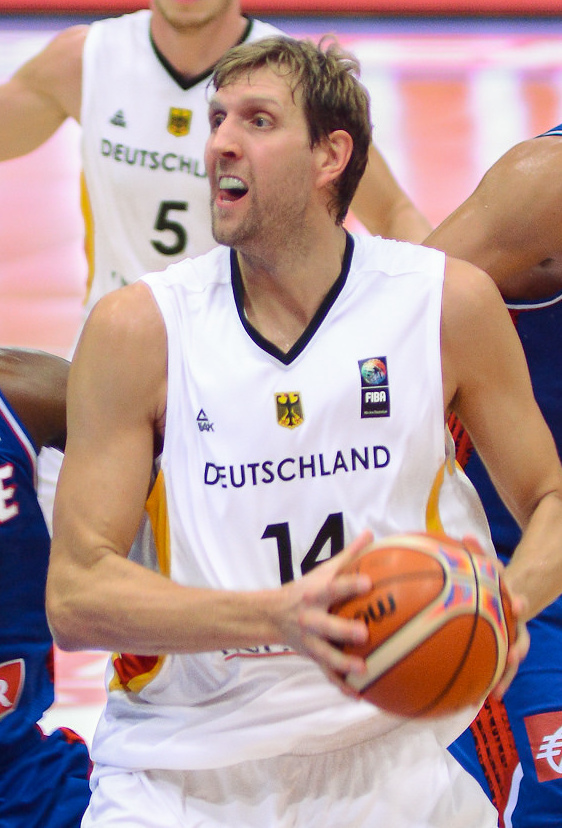
Dirk Nowitzki

After missing out on reaching the 2000 Olympics, Germany entered the EuroBasket 2001. First up for the team was Estonia, where Dirk Nowitzki poured in (33 points and 12 rebounds) to lead Germany to a 92–71 victory. Following the win, Germany won two out of their next three games to advance. In the quarter-finals against France, Nowitzki's 32 points helped the team into the semis against Turkey. There, Germany's run at the event would come to a close, after losing a tough battle to the hosts 78–79. With the bronze medal still attainable, even behind Nowitzki's tournament high (43 points and 15 rebounds), Germany was outlasted by the Pau Gasol led Spain 90–99.

At the 2002 FIBA World Cup, Germany was placed into Group C to begin the competition. The first game for the team was a wire-to-wire victory over China 76–88, with Dirk Nowitzki leading the way once again with (30 points and 8 rebounds). After the win, Germany would make it all the way to the quarter-finals with a rematch versus Spain, who they lost to in the bronze medal game at EuroBasket 2001. The team would ultimately prevail in a come-from-behind win 62–70, to reach the semis. There, Germany came up short against Argentina 80–86, and having to play in the third place game. Germany went on to earn their first medal at the World Cup, by defeating New Zealand 94–117. Moreover, national team star Dirk Nowitzki was named tournament MVP.

A year later, at EuroBasket 2003, Germany suffered its worst performance at the competition since the 1997 edition. The team failed to reach the knockout stage, and also missed out on the 2004 Olympics in the process, as the event was also a qualifier. After Germany stumbled through the EuroBasket in 2003, the team entered the tournament in 2005 with renewed ambition. Making it through the preliminary phase, and the playoff, the team was back into the quarter-finals once again. Germany would then display an all-around effort, with four players in double figures to eliminate Slovenia 62–76. In the semi-finals, Dirk Nowitzki who played the entire 40 minutes, recording (27 points and 7 rebounds) willed Germany past Spain 73–74 into the final for the first time in 12 years. However, the team would lose in the title game against the more experienced Greece 78–62. Even in defeat, the clutch play by Nowitzki throughout the competition got him the MVP award.

Entering the 2006 FIBA World Cup, Germany won three out of their first four games, and were tied for second place in Group B with Angola. With one game left in the phase, which was against Angola, Dirk Nowitzki put up his personal tournament record of (47 points) in a 103–108 triple overtime win to secure second place. After moving past Nigeria 78–77 in the Round of 16, the team would get eliminated in the quarter-finals by a Carmelo Anthony led United States 85–65. At EuroBasket 2007, Germany once again made it through to the quarter-finals, but were embarrassed in the round by hosts Spain 83–55; and ousted from the tournament.

During the 2008 Olympic Qualifying Tournament, Germany seized qualification to the 2008 Olympic Games, after grabbing the final spot by defeating Puerto Rico 82–96. The team, however, exhibited no urgency after their opening victory in the competition against Angola. Germany would finish with a record of (1–4), and fail to make it out of the preliminary phase. At EuroBasket 2009, and this time without Dirk Nowitzki, the national team continued their subpar play; and missed out on reaching the quarter-finals.

For qualification to the 2010 FIBA World Cup, Germany gained entrance into the tournament by receiving a wild card. However, they were quickly eliminated from the event, after posting a (2–3) record in the group phase. The following year, at EuroBasket 2011, Nowitzki rejoined the national team for the first time since the 2008 Olympics. Drawn in Group B to begin the competition, Germany displayed dominance in their first game against Israel 91–64. The team would eventually pickup two more wins in the round to finish at (3–2), and advance toward the second group phase. There, Germany struggled, winning only one game versus Turkey to have their tournament end. After failing to qualify for the 2012 Olympics, Germany entered the EuroBasket 2013. Without the services of an ageing Dirk Nowitzki, expectations for the team were limited. Placed in Group A, Germany started off the tournament with a surprise win over France 74–80. However, after the brilliance demonstrated in the opening match, the team endured losses in three of their next four games in the round to be eliminated.

For EuroBasket 2015, Germany was named as one of four co-hosts for the event. With Dirk Nowitzki making a return to the team for the first time since 2011, there was hope he could once again help Germany for a deep run. Drawn into Group B at the Euro finals, seen by many as the "Group of Death" entering the tournament, Germany prevailed in their first match against Iceland 71–65. After the win, the team would have the misfortune of losing their last four matches of the preliminary round by seven points or less in each game to close out the event (1–4). Following the tough tournament for Germany, national team legend Dirk Nowitzki announced his retirement from international competition.

=== Schröder takes over (2017–present) ===
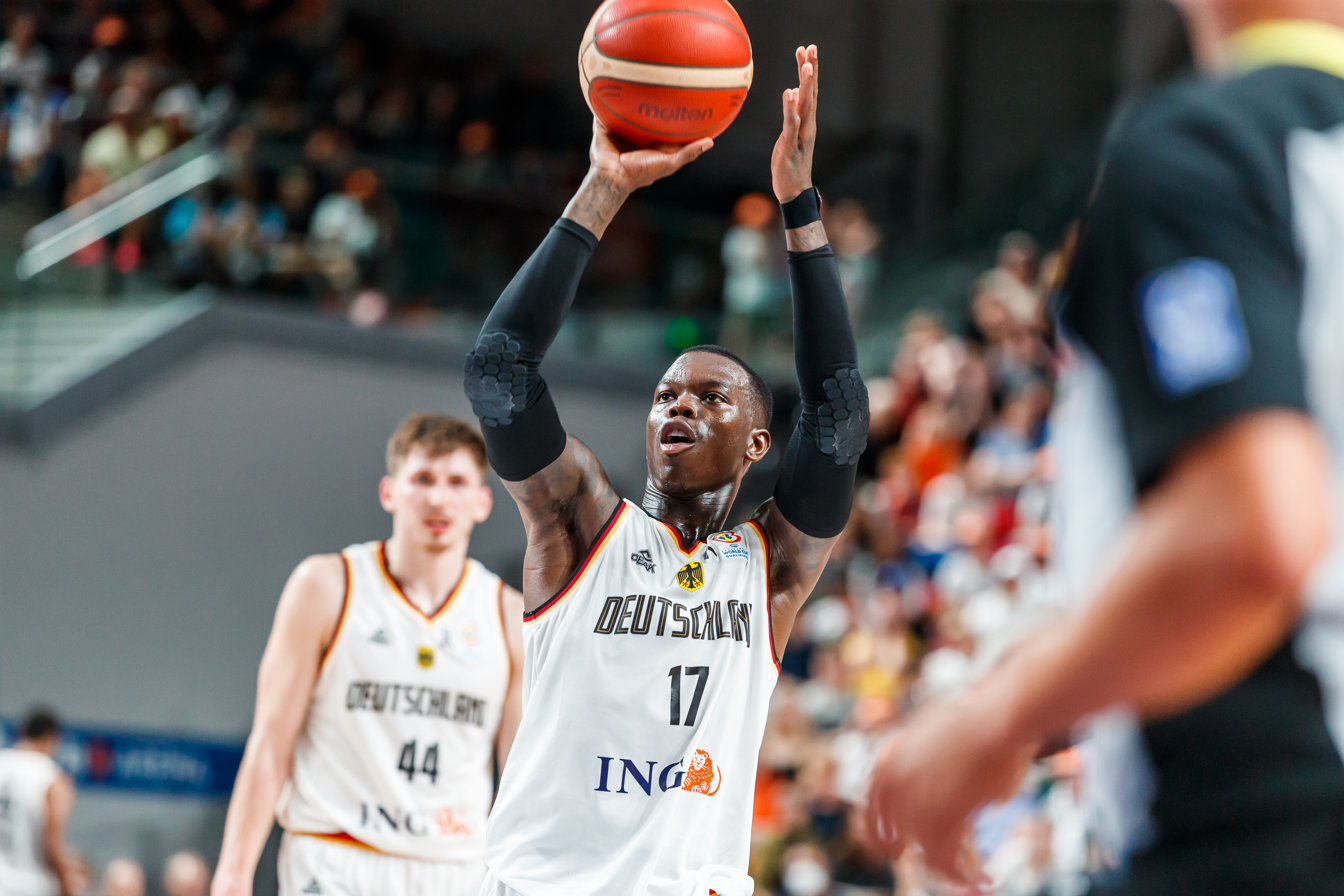
Dennis Schröder in 2022

With the disappointment of the previous EuroBasket in the rear-view, Germany did come away from the competition with some positives. The team uncovered rising phenom point guard Dennis Schröder, who led Germany in scoring and assists at the event in 2015.

During qualifying for the EuroBasket 2017, Germany put away Denmark in their first game 101–74, before their derby with Austria. Entering the match, the energetic Austria crowd helped their side hold the lead for majority of the contest, but Germany would make a final push in the fourth quarter to steal the away game 59–61. After their resilient win in Austria, the team went on to garner a (4–2) record to secure qualification.

At the tournament, Germany finished second in Group B with a (3–2) record, and advanced into the Round of 16. There, they defeated rivals France in a back-and-forth battle 84–81. In their quarter-finals match, the team came up short against the eventual bronze medalist Spain 84–72. While Germany's run did not end the way they wanted, the immense efforts of Dennis Schröder stood out. He finished number two in scoring at the competition for the second consecutive EuroBasket.

In European Qualifiers for the 2019 FIBA World Cup, Germany opened up their World Cup qualifying campaign with a victory at home against Georgia 79–70. Following the win, Germany swept through the first round of qualifiers at (6–0) to advance. During the second and final round, the team easily trounced Estonia 43–86 in the first game. Against Israel in game two, with a chance to clinch qualification to the World Cup with four games remaining, Germany rallied from 23 points down to eventually win in overtime 112–98.

At the World Cup finals for the first time since 2010, Germany was drawn into Group F to begin the event. However, after two narrow loses to France and Dominican Republic, Germany easily defeated Jordan 96–62. With a record of (1–2) in group play, the team could not advance, and were sent into the classification phase to finish out the competition. Two years later, Germany went undefeated (4–0) during the Olympic Qualifying Tournament in Split, Croatia, to qualify for the Tokyo Olympics. At the 2020 Olympic Games, which was delayed until 2021 due to the COVID-19 pandemic, Germany finished (1–2) in the preliminary phase. However, with the team being ranked as one of the best third-place finishers of the three groups, it was enough to advance. In the quarter-finals, Germany would progress no further, as they were eliminated in the round by Slovenia 86–70.

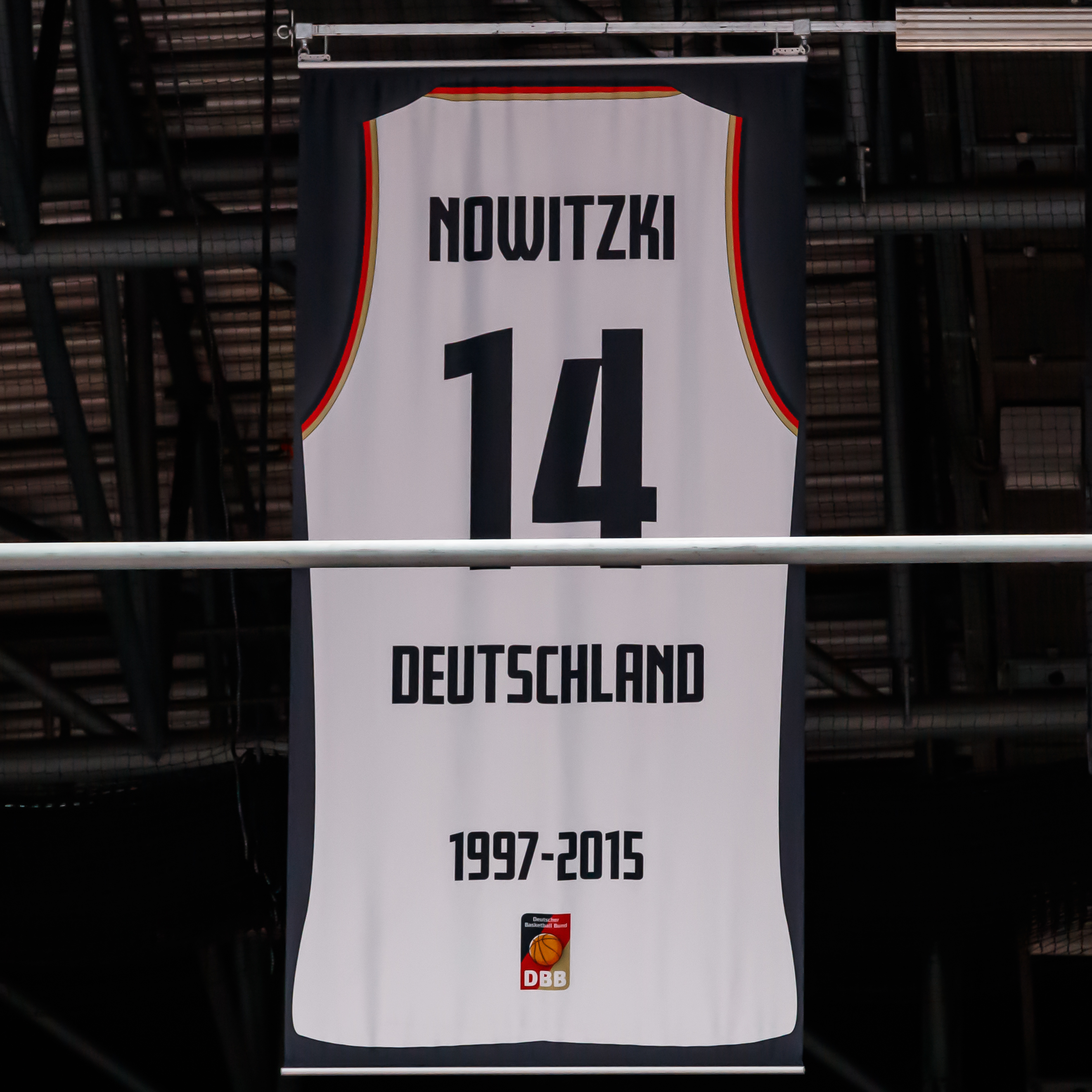
Nowitzki's number 14 retired by the Germany national team.

At the EuroBasket 2022, Germany co-hosted the competition for the second time. With Dennis Schröder back in the fold for the national team, after missing out on the 2020 Olympics, Germany entered the event with high hopes. Prior to Germany's Group B opener against France, the German Basketball Federation held a ceremony to honour national team icon Dirk Nowitzki, where his number 14 jersey was officially retired. After the conclusion of pre-game festivities, Germany would go on to capitalise on the emotions of the evening to win 63–76. Following Germany's victory over Bosnia and Herzegivina in game two, the team prevailed in a tough double overtime battle versus Lithuania 107–109. At a record of (3–0), the team would suffer their first defeat of the competition to Slovenia, before closing out the group stage with a win against Hungary.

After eliminating Montenegro in the Round of 16, Germany were up against Giannis Antetokounmpo and Greece in the quarter-finals. However, behind Germany's torrid shooting game, the team emphatically secured their place into the semi-finals for the first time in 17 years, with a 107–96 victory. There, the team would come up short against the eventual champions Spain 91–96. With the bronze medal still in reach, Germany would defeat Poland 82–69, to finish the tournament.

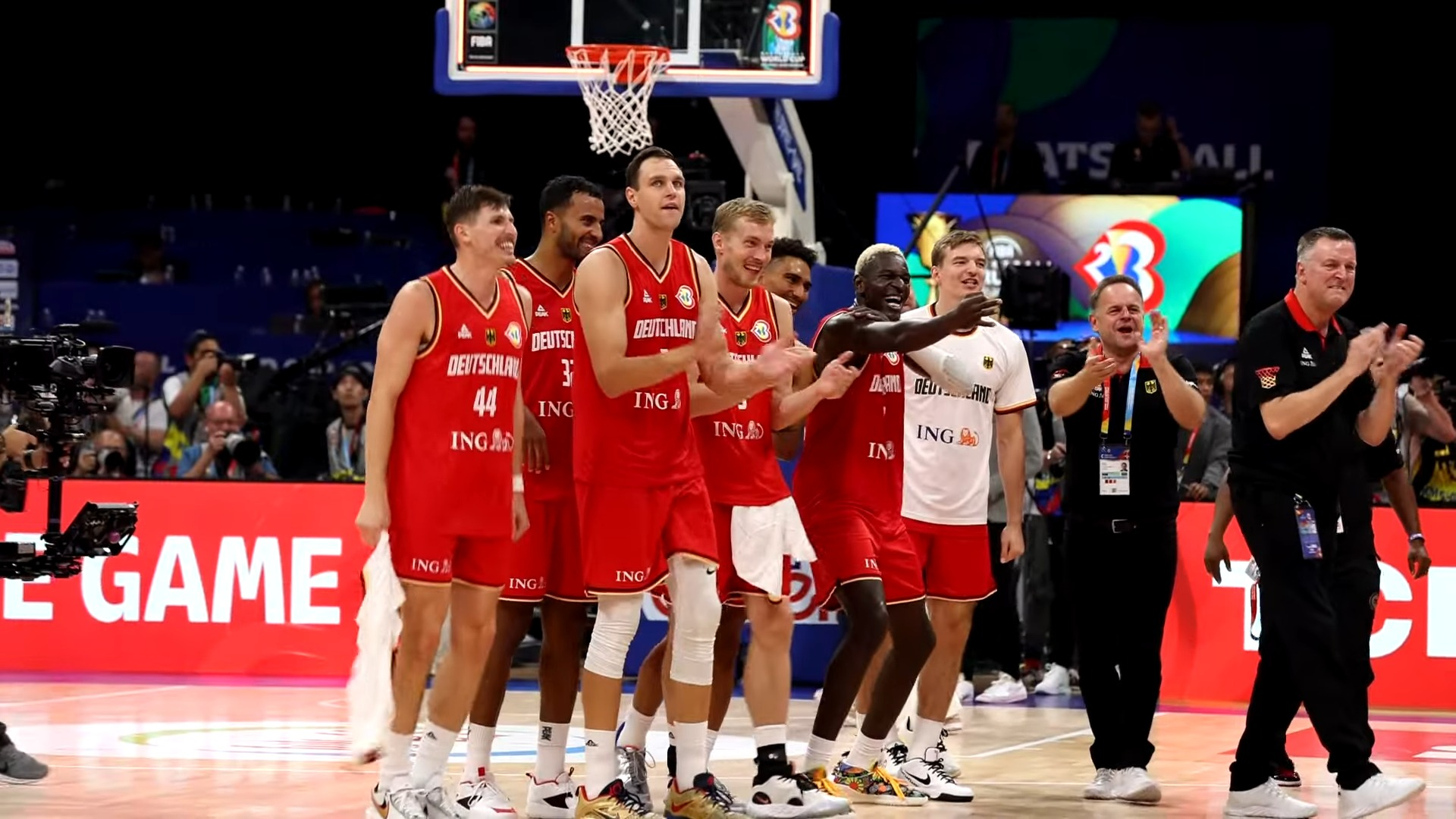
Germany after defeating the United States in the 2023 FIBA World Cup semi-final.

Following Germany's third-place finish at the Euros in 2022, the team went through European Qualifiers for the 2023 FIBA World Cup. Finishing with a (10–2) record during qualification, Germany confirmed their seventh World Cup appearance. Entering the event, Germany was poised to not replicate the underwhelming performance they exhibited at the 2019 World Cup, as the team completed the preliminary phase of the competition at (3–0).

Heading toward the second round, after heavily defeating Georgia 100–73 in the first game, Germany displayed dominance after a slow start to rout Luka Dončić and Slovenia 100–71. Led by team captain Dennis Schröder's (24 points and 10 assists), Germany would advance into the quarter-finals. There, Germany escaped a back and forth clash versus the surprise team of the tournament in Latvia 81–79. At the semis, helped by the clutch performance of national team veteran Andreas Obst and his (24 points), Germany eliminated the United States 111–113, to reach the World Cup final for the first time in their history. In the title game, in a tightly contested affair, Germany defeated Serbia 83–77 to become world champions. After the event, the consistent play throughout the tournament from Dennis Schröder earned him the MVP award.

Following Germany's triumph at the World Cup, the team entered the 2024 Olympic Games. Placed in Group B for the preliminary round, Germany defeated Japan 97–77, to begin the tournament (1–0). The team went on to win their next two games of the round, to advance into the quarter-finals. There, they would knockout Greece 76–63, to reach the semi-finals of the Olympics for the first time. However, Germany would lose in the round to hosts France 73–69, to eventually go on to finish out the competition in fourth place.

Germany entered EuroBasket 2025 qualifying, where the team would conclude their campaign with a (4–2) record to make their 26th appearance on the continental stage. At the finals, Germany were drawn into Group B, where they began their tournament run with a comfortable 106–76 victory over Montenegro. Following their win, Germany closed out the group stage defeating their last four opponents by a combined margin of 134 points to advance. In the Round of 16, Germany struggled through their first three quarters versus Portugal, before surging in the final period to reach the quarter-finals. There, in a back-and-forth tussle, Germany outlasted Slovenia 99–91, to make it to their second consecutive semi-finals at the tournament.

In a group stage rematch against Finland, led by captain Dennis Schröder's (26 points and 12 assists), Germany prevailed 98–86, to return to the final of the EuroBasket for the first time since 2005. With the title on the line, in a test of resilience, Germany defeated Turkey 83–88, to win their second European championship. Following the competition, the composed play throughout the event from Dennis Schröder earned him tournament MVP.

== Competitive record ==
=== FIBA World Cup ===
World Cup					Qualification		
Year	Position	Pld	W	L	Pld	W	L
(Argentina) 1950	Banned				Banned		
(Brazil) 1954	Did not qualify				EuroBasket served as qualifiers		
(Chile) 1959	Did not qualify				EuroBasket served as qualifiers		
(Brazil) 1963	Did not qualify				EuroBasket served as qualifiers		
(Uruguay) 1967	Did not qualify				EuroBasket served as qualifiers		
(Socialist Federal Republic of Yugoslavia) 1970	Did not qualify				EuroBasket served as qualifiers		
(Puerto Rico) 1974	Did not qualify				EuroBasket served as qualifiers		
(Philippines) 1978	Did not qualify				EuroBasket served as qualifiers		
(Colombia) 1982	Did not qualify				EuroBasket served as qualifiers		
(Spain) 1986	13th	5	2	3	6	4	2
(Argentina) 1990	Did not qualify				EuroBasket served as qualifiers		
(Canada) 1994	12th	8	5	3	EuroBasket served as qualifiers		
(Greece) 1998	Did not qualify				EuroBasket served as qualifiers		
(United States) 2002	3rd place, bronze medalist(s)	9	6	3	EuroBasket served as qualifiers		
(Japan) 2006	8th	9	5	4	EuroBasket served as qualifiers		
(Turkey) 2010	17th	5	2	3	Wild card		
(Spain) 2014	Did not qualify				Did not qualify		
(China) 2019	18th	5	3	2	12	9	3
(Philippines) (Japan) (Indonesia) 2023	1st place, gold medalist(s)	8	8	0	12	10	2
(Qatar) 2027	To be determined				To be determined		
(France) 2031	To be determined				To be determined		
Total	7/19	49	31	18	30	23	7

=== Olympic Games ===
Olympic Games					Qualifying		
Year	Position	Pld	W	L	Pld	W	L
(Nazi Germany) 1936	15th	4	1	3			
(United Kingdom) 1948	Banned from entering						
(Finland) 1952	Did not enter						
(Australia) 1956	Did not qualify						
(Italy) 1960	Did not qualify				5	3	2
(Japan) 1964	Did not enter				Did not enter		
(Mexico) 1968	Did not qualify				7	1	6
(West Germany) 1972	12th	9	3	6	Qualified as host		
(Canada) 1976	Did not enter				Did not enter		
(Soviet Union) 1980	Did not qualify				9	4	5
(United States) 1984	8th	8	2	6	9	5	4
(South Korea) 1988	Did not qualify				10	4	6
(Spain) 1992	7th	8	3	5	11	7	4
(United States) 1996	Did not qualify				Did not qualify		
(Australia) 2000	Did not qualify				Did not qualify		
(Greece) 2004	Did not qualify				Did not qualify		
(China) 2008	10th	5	1	4	5	4	1
(United Kingdom) 2012	Did not qualify				Did not qualify		
(Brazil) 2016	Did not qualify				Did not qualify		
(Japan) 2020	8th	4	1	3	4	4	0
(France) 2024	4th	6	4	2	Directly qualified		
(United States) 2028	To be determined				To be determined		
Total	7/21	44	15	29	60	32	28

=== EuroBasket ===
EuroBasket					Qualification		
Year	Position	Pld	W	L	Pld	W	L
(Switzerland) 1935	Did not enter						
(Latvia) 1937	Did not enter						
(Lithuania) 1939	Did not enter						
(Switzerland) 1946	Banned from entering						
(Czechoslovakia) 1947	Banned from entering						
(Egypt) 1949	Banned from entering						
(France) 1951	12th	8	2	6			
(Soviet Union) 1953	14th	8	3	5			
(Hungary) 1955	17th	8	3	5			
(Bulgaria) 1957	13th	10	3	7			
(Turkey) 1959	Did not enter						
(Socialist Federal Republic of Yugoslavia) 1961	16th	6	1	5			
(Poland) 1963	Did not qualify				4	1	3
(Soviet Union) 1965	14th	9	2	7	3	2	1
(Finland) 1967	Did not qualify				3	1	2
(Italy) 1969	Did not qualify				4	1	3
(West Germany) 1971	9th	7	3	4	Qualified as host		
(Spain) 1973	Did not qualify				10	6	4
(Socialist Federal Republic of Yugoslavia) 1975	Did not qualify				5	3	2
(Belgium) 1977	Did not qualify				5	2	3
(Italy) 1979	Did not qualify				5	2	3
(Czechoslovakia) 1981	10th	8	2	6	8	6	2
(France) 1983	8th	7	3	4	9	6	3
(West Germany) 1985	5th	8	5	3	Qualified as host		
(Greece) 1987	6th	8	4	4	Directly qualified		
(Socialist Federal Republic of Yugoslavia) 1989	Did not qualify				6	1	5
(Italy) 1991	Did not qualify				10	4	6
(Germany) 1993	1st place, gold medalist(s)	9	6	3	Qualified as host		
(Greece) 1995	10th	6	1	5	Directly qualified		
(Spain) 1997	12th	8	1	7	10	7	3
(France) 1999	7th	9	4	5	10	7	3
(Turkey) 2001	4th	7	4	3	Directly qualified		
(Sweden) 2003	9th	4	2	2	10	9	1
(Serbia and Montenegro) 2005	2nd place, silver medalist(s)	7	5	2	6	6	0
(Spain) 2007	5th	9	5	4	Directly qualified		
(Poland) 2009	11th	6	1	5	Directly qualified		
(Lithuania) 2011	9th	8	4	4	Directly qualified		
(Slovenia) 2013	17th	5	2	3	8	8	0
(France) (Croatia) (Germany) (Latvia) 2015	18th	5	1	4	6	4	2
(Finland) (Israel) (Romania) (Turkey) 2017	6th	7	4	3	6	4	2
(Czech Republic) (Georgia (country)) (Italy) (Germany) 2022	3rd place, bronze medalist(s)	9	7	2	6	1	5
(Cyprus) (Finland) (Poland) (Latvia) 2025	1st place, gold medalist(s)	9	9	0	6	4	2
(Estonia) (Greece) (Slovenia) (Spain) 2029	To be determined				To be determined		
Total	26/42	195	87	108	140	85	55

== Results and fixtures ==
Win Loss

=== 2025 ===
28 November 2025 2027 FIBA World Cup qualifiers – 1st round	Germany	89–69	Israel	Neu-Ulm, Germany
19:30 CET (UTC+1)	Scoring by quarter: 26–22, 24–9, 19–22, 20–16
	Pts: O. Da Silva 19; Rebs: Bonga 10; Asts: Hollatz 6	Boxscore	Pts: Sorkin 18; Rebs: Sorkin, Zoosman 7 Asts: Timor 4	Arena: Ratiopharm Arena; Attendance: 6,049; Referees: Boris Krejić (SVN), Valentin Oliot (FRA), Zafer Yılmaz (TUR)

1 December 2025 2027 FIBA World Cup qualifiers – 1st round	Cyprus	64–83	Germany	Limassol, Cyprus
19:00 EET (UTC+2)	Scoring by quarter: 17–20, 22–22, 9–27, 16–14
	Pts: Stylianou 16; Rebs: Michail 6 Asts: Michail 4	Boxscore	Pts: Krämer, Pape 14; Rebs: Krämer 10; Asts: Kayil 5	Arena: Spyros Kyprianou Athletic Center; Attendance: 950; Referees: Lorenzo Baldini (ITA), Zdenko Tomašovič (SVK), Elvis Binders-Čoders (LAT)

=== 2026 ===
27 February 2026 2027 FIBA World Cup qualifiers – 1st round	Croatia	93–88	Germany	Zagreb, Croatia
20:00 CET (UTC+1)	Scoring by quarter: 20–26, 26–24, 29–22, 18–16
	Pts: Šarić 23; Rebs: Šarić 7 Asts: Mavra, Smith 6	Boxscore	Pts: Krämer 22; Rebs: Schneider 9 Asts: Kayil 5	Arena: Dražen Petrović Basketball Hall; Attendance: 4,700; Referees: Wojciech Liszka (POL), Gatis Saliņš (LAT), Ritvars Helmšteins (LAT)

1 March 2026 2027 FIBA World Cup qualifiers – 1st round	Germany	91–89(OT)	Croatia	Bonn, Germany
18:00 CET (UTC+1)	Scoring by quarter: 22–24, 19–26, 21–17, 15–10, Overtime: 14–12
	Pts: Thiemann 24; Rebs: Thiemann 12; Asts: Kayil 6	Boxscore	Pts: Hezonja 30; Rebs: Smith 9 Asts: Smith 9	Arena: Telekom Dome; Attendance: 6,032; Referees: Yohan Rosso (FRA), Andris Aunkrogers (LAT), Zdenko Tomašovič (SVK)

3 July 2026 2027 FIBA World Cup qualifiers – 1st round	Israel	86–92	Germany	Riga, Latvia
20:00 (UTC+3)	Scoring by quarter: 15–23, 22–22, 18–31, 31–16
	Pts: Madar 31; Rebs: Ginat 8 Asts: Ginat 7	Boxscore	Pts: Schröder 20; Rebs: Sengfelder 6 Asts: Schröder 9	Arena: Xiaomi Arena; Attendance: 100; Referees: Alberto Sánchez (ESP), Elvis Binders-Čoders (LAT), Ariadna Chueca (ESP)

6 July 2026 2027 FIBA World Cup qualifiers – 1st round	Germany	111–79	Cyprus	Bamberg, Germany
19:00 CEST (UTC+2)	Scoring by quarter: 22–21, 34–10, 30–25, 25–23
	Pts: Schröder 20; Rebs: Sengfelder 10; Asts: Schröder 9	Boxscore	Pts: Giannaras, F. Tigkas 14; Rebs: Mantovani 5 Asts: Giannaras, Iliadis 4	Arena: Brose Arena; Attendance: 5,713; Referees: Dariusz Zapolski (POL), Blaž Zupančič (SVN), Tomasz Langowski (POL)

21 August 2026 DBB Supercup 2026	Germany	115–82	Czech Republic	Hamburg, Germany
20:30 CEST (UTC+2)	Scoring by quarter: 24–21, 26–28, 36–17, 29–16
	Pts: Thiemann 20; Rebs: Thiemann 9 Asts: Schröder 10	Boxscore	Pts: Bálint 27; Rebs: Svoboda 7 Asts: Sýkora 4	Arena: Barclays Arena; Attendance: 8,793

22 August 2026 DBB Supercup 2026	Germany	96–87	Croatia	Hamburg, Germany
20:30 CEST (UTC+2)	Scoring by quarter: 24–24, 26–15, 28–30, 18–18
	Pts: O. Da Silva 22; Rebs: Schröder 7 Asts: Schröder 10	Boxscore	Pts: Hezonja, Zubac 19; Rebs: Zubac 13; Asts: Šarić 3	Arena: Barclays Arena; Attendance: 9,583

27 August 2026 2027 FIBA World Cup qualifiers – 2nd round	Germany	99–83	Netherlands	Cologne, Germany
20:00 CEST (UTC+2)	Scoring by quarter: 38–31, 26–19, 18–16, 17–17
	Pts: Schröder 23; Rebs: Olinde 7 Asts: Schröder 6	Boxscore	Pts: Franke 24; Rebs: D. N'Guessan 6 Asts: Van der Vuurst 6	Arena: Lanxess Arena; Attendance: 15,309; Referees: Gvidas Gedvilas (LTU), Yener Yılmaz (TUR), Geert Jacobs (BEL)

30 August 2026 2027 FIBA World Cup qualifiers – 2nd round	Poland	94–96(OT)	Germany	Gdańsk, Poland
14:45 CEST (UTC+2)	Scoring by quarter: 15–28, 16–13, 27–29, 25–13, Overtime: 11–13
	Pts: Ponitka 20; Rebs: Olejniczak 12; Asts: Pluta, Ponitka 5	Boxscore	Pts: Schröder 18; Rebs: Thiemann 12; Asts: Schröder 5	Arena: Ergo Arena; Attendance: 10,094; Referees: Ademir Zurapović (BIH), Boris Krejić (SVN), Gintaras Mačiulis (LTU)

27 November 2026 2027 FIBA World Cup qualifiers – 2nd round	Latvia	vs.	Germany	Riga, Latvia
19:30 EET (UTC+2)
		Boxscore		Arena: Xiaomi Arena

30 November 2026 2027 FIBA World Cup qualifiers – 2nd round	Germany	vs.	Poland	Frankfurt, Germany
19:30 CET (UTC+1)
		Boxscore		Arena: Süwag Energie ARENA

=== 2027 ===
25 February 2027 2027 FIBA World Cup qualifiers – 2nd round	Netherlands	vs.	Germany	Netherlands
--:-- CET (UTC+1)
		Boxscore

28 February 2027 2027 FIBA World Cup qualifiers – 2nd round	Germany	vs.	Latvia	Germany
--:-- CET (UTC+1)
		Boxscore

== Team ==
=== Current roster ===
Roster for the 2027 FIBA World Cup Qualifiers matches on 27 and 30 August 2026 against Netherlands and Poland.

Germany men's national basketball team roster
Players
Coaches

Pos.	No.	Name	Age – Date of birth	Height	Club	Ctr.
SF	0	Isaac Bonga	26 – 8 November 1999	2.04 m (6 ft 8 in)	Panathinaikos	(Greece)
PF	1	Oscar da Silva	27 – 21 September 1998	2.05 m (6 ft 9 in)	Bayern Munich	(Germany)
G	4	Maodo Lô	33 – 31 December 1992	1.96 m (6 ft 5 in)	Žalgiris	(Lithuania)
F	5	Tristan da Silva	25 – 15 May 2001	2.03 m (6 ft 8 in)	Orlando Magic	(United States)
C	10	Daniel Theis	34 – 4 April 1992	2.03 m (6 ft 8 in)	Maccabi Tel Aviv	(Israel)
PG	11	Nelson Weidemann	27 – 25 March 1999	1.91 m (6 ft 3 in)	Free agent
F	16	Louis Olinde	28 – 19 March 1998	2.05 m (6 ft 9 in)	Reyer	(Italy)
PG	17	Dennis Schröder (C)	32 – 15 September 1993	1.88 m (6 ft 2 in)	Charlotte Hornets	(United States)
SF	19	Kay Bruhnke	25 – 15 July 2001	2.03 m (6 ft 8 in)	Rytas	(Lithuania)
SF	20	Malte Delow	25 – 22 April 2001	1.97 m (6 ft 6 in)	Alba Berlin	(Germany)
G/F	29	Kostja Mushidi	28 – 18 June 1998	1.95 m (6 ft 5 in)	Chemnitz	(Germany)
PF	32	Johannes Thiemann	32 – 9 February 1994	2.05 m (6 ft 9 in)	Bayern Munich	(Germany)
SG	44	David Krämer	29 – 14 January 1997	1.96 m (6 ft 5 in)	Crvena zvezda	(Serbia)

Head coach

- (Spain) Álex Mumbrú

Assistant coach(es)

- (Australia) / (Bosnia and Herzegovina) Alan Ibrahimagić
- (Spain) Roberto Molina
- (Germany) Sebastian Trzcionka

Legend

- (C) Team captain
- Club – describes last
  club before the competition
- Age – describes age
  on 27 August 2026

=== Depth chart ===
Pos.	Starting 5	Bench 1	Bench 2
C	Daniel Theis	Johannes Thiemann
PF	Isaac Bonga	Oscar da Silva	Kostja Mushidi
SF	Tristan da Silva	Louis Olinde	Kay Bruhnke
SG	David Krämer	Malte Delow
PG	Dennis Schröder	Maodo Lô	Nelson Weidemann

== Head coach history ==
- (Germany) Hugo Murero – (1935–1942)
- (Netherlands) / (West Germany) Theo Clausen – (1947–1951)
- (West Germany) Anton Kartak – (1951–1956)
- (Czechoslovakia) Theodor Vychodil – (1956–1961)
- (Socialist Federal Republic of Yugoslavia) Branimir Volfer – (1961–1962)
- (Turkey) / (West Germany) / (Greece) Yakovos Bilek – (1962–1968)
- (West Germany) Kurt Siebenhaar – (1968–1969)
- (Czechoslovakia) Miloslav Kriz – (1969–1971)
- (West Germany) Theodor Schober – (1971–1972)
- (West Germany) Dietfried Kienast – (1972–1973)
- (Armenia) / (France) Pascal Ezguilian – (1974–1976)
- (Brazil) Raimondo Nonato De Azevedo – (1976)
- (West Germany) Bernd Röder – (1976–1980)
- (United States) Terry Schofield – (1980–1982)
- (United States) Chris Lee – (1983–1984)
- (Israel) Ralph Klein – (1983–1986)
- (Socialist Federal Republic of Yugoslavia) Svetislav Pešić – (1987–1993)
- (Germany) Dirk Bauermann – (1994)
- (Serbia and Montenegro) Vladislav Lučić – (1994–1997)
- (Finland) Henrik Dettmann – (1997–2003)
- (Germany) Dirk Bauermann – (2003–2012)
- (Serbia) Svetislav Pešić – (2012)
- (Germany) Frank Menz – (2013–2014)
- (Bosnia and Herzegovina) Emir Mutapčić – (2014)
- (United States) Chris Fleming – (2014–2017)
- (Germany) Henrik Rödl – (2017–2021)
- (Canada) / (Finland) Gordon Herbert – (2021–2024)
- (Spain) Álex Mumbrú – (2024–present)

== Notable players ==
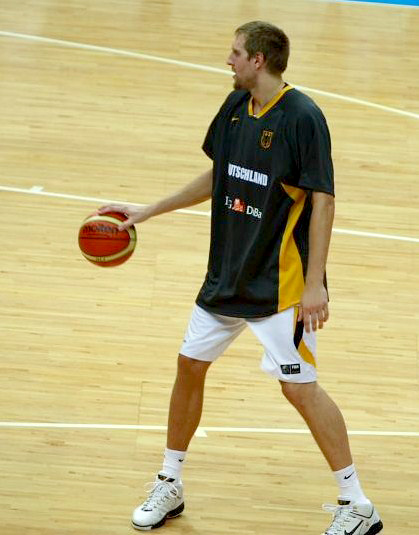
Dirk Nowitzki was a pillar for Germany throughout his career.

- Stephen Arigbabu
- Gunther Behnke
- Uwe Blab – Former NBA player
- Shawn Bradley – Former NBA player; American with dual citizenship through jus sanguinis
- Mithat Demirel
- Patrick Femerling – Had the most caps for the national team with (221)
- Hansi Gnad
- Henning Harnisch – Currently vice president of Alba Berlin
- Mike Jackel
- Chris Kaman – Former NBA player; American with dual citizenship, born and raised in the U.S., German citizenship through jus sanguinis
- Michael Koch – Currently a professional basketball Head coach
- Jens Kujawa
- Dirk Nowitzki – Former NBA star, 2011 NBA Champion, 2011 NBA Finals MVP, 2007 NBA MVP, 13× NBA All-Star, MVP of the 2002 World Cup and the EuroBasket 2005. His national team number 14 has been retired, and a replica of the jersey is hung from the rafters at all home national team games.
- Kai Nürnberger
- Ademola Okulaja – Former player at North Carolina
- Tibor Pleiß
- Henrik Rödl – Former player at North Carolina and Alba Berlin
- Detlef Schrempf – The first German NBA star, former player of the Seattle SuperSonics, 3× NBA All-Star, 2× NBA Sixth Man of the Year
- Dennis Schröder – Current NBA player for the Charlotte Hornets
- Daniel Theis – Former NBA player, currently playing for Maccabi Tel Aviv
- Franz Wagner – Current NBA player for the Orlando Magic
- Moritz Wagner – Current NBA player for the Brooklyn Nets
- Christian Welp – Former NBA player; hit the winning free throw (completing a 3-point-play) in the EuroBasket 1993 final, and named tournament MVP
- Denis Wucherer

=== International influence ===
In Germany, professional basketball is known for developing players whose parents or grandparents are immigrants. The national team routinely uses many players who have family roots in Africa, Eastern Europe, United States or others, but have grown up in Germany and speak fluent German. Some examples are:

- African-German: Stephen Arigbabu, Misan Nikagbatse, Ademola Okulaja, Dennis Schröder, Marvin Willoughby, Maodo Lô, Isaac Bonga
- American-German: Shawn Bradley, Max DiLeo, Robert Garrett, Stefano Garris, Demond Greene, Elias Harris, Isaiah Hartenstein, Frank Hudson, Chris Kaman, Patrick King, Mike Knörr, James Marsh, Christopher McNaughton, Jens-Uwe Gordon, Nick Weiler-Babb, Collin Welp
- Brazilian-German: Dominik Bahiense de Mello, Oscar da Silva, Tristan da Silva
- Canadian-German: Michael Jackel
- Croatian-German: Stipo Papić, Dražan Tomić
- Polish-German: Konrad Wysocki
- Russian-German: Dominik Bahiense de Mello, Kostja Mushidi
- Serbian-German: Vladimir Bogojević, Marko Pešić
- Turkish-German: Mahir Agva, İsmet Akpınar, Mithat Demirel, Teoman Öztürk
- Moroccan-German: Yassin Idbihi

While most German players develop through the club system, several players over the years have played U.S. college basketball. Past and present national team players who have done so include:

- Uwe Blab – Indiana
- Shawn Bradley – BYU (born in Germany, was raised in Utah, making a college basketball career a natural progression)
- Oscar da Silva – Stanford
- Tristan da Silva – Colorado
- Max DiLeo – Monmouth
- Patrick Femerling – Washington
- Niels Giffey – UConn
- Hansi Gnad – Alaska-Anchorage (Division II Program)
- Elias Harris – Gonzaga
- Johannes Herber – West Virginia
- Frank Hudson – Glassboro State/NAIA (born in Germany)
- Jan-Hendrik Jagla – Penn State
- Patrick King – Bucknell
- Moritz Kleine-Brockhoff – Hawaii
- Mike Knörr – East Texas State (now known as Texas A&M–Commerce)
- Alexander Kühl – UNC Charlotte
- Jens Kujawa – Illinois
- Jürgen Malbeck – Hawaiʻi Pacific/NAIA
- James Marsh – Davidson
- Rolf Mayr – Duquesne
- Christopher McNaughton – Bucknell
- Sven Meyer – Oregon
- Mathis Mönninghoff – Gonzaga
- Detlef Musch – Davidson
- Arnd Neuhaus – Duquesne
- Kai Nürnberger – Southern Illinois
- Ademola Okulaja – North Carolina
- Michael Pappert – Redlands (Division III)
- Ulrich Peters a.k.a. Ulrich Trogele – Wichita State (raised in the U.S.)
- Henrik Rödl – North Carolina
- Detlef Schrempf – Washington
- Christian Sengfelder – Boise State
- Julian Sensley – Hawaii (born to a German mother and raised in the U.S.)
- Lucca Staiger – Iowa State
- Marc Suhr – UConn
- Gerrit Terdenge – Fresno State
- Franz Wagner – Michigan
- Moritz Wagner – Michigan
- Christian Welp – Washington
- Collin Welp – UC Irvine
- Kirsten Zöllner – Albany

== Past rosters ==
As Germany

1936 Olympic Games: finished 17th among 21 teams

1 Bernhard Cuiper, 2 Robert Duis, 3 Karl Endres, 4 Emil Göing, 5 Otto Kuchenbecker, 6 Emil Lohbeck, 7 Hans Niclaus, 8 Kurt Oleska, 9 Siegfried Reischies, 10 Heinz Steinschulte (Coach: Hugo Murero)

As West Germany

1951 EuroBasket: finished 12th among 17 teams

3 Kurt Siebenhaar, 4 Ulrich Konz, 5 Felix Diefenbach, 6 Wolfgang Heinker, 7 Rudi Hohner, 8 Rudolf Beyerlein, 9 Franz Kronberger, 10 Willi Leissler, 11 Markus Bernhard, 12 Gunter Piontek, 13 Oskar Roth, 14 Theodor Schober, 15 Harald Muller, 16 Arthur Stolz (Coach: Theo Clausen)

1953 EuroBasket: finished 14th among 17 teams

3 Kurt Siebenhaar, 4 Theodor Schober, 5 Richard Mahrwald, 6 Gunter Piontek, 7 Friedrich Mahlo, 8 Hans Bayer, 10 Hartmut Kruger, 11 Oskar Roth, 12 Rolf Heinker, 13 Gerd Konzag, 14 Rudolf Beyerlein, 15 Richard Griese, 16 Markus Bernhard (Coach: Anton Kartak)

1955 EuroBasket: finished 17th among 18 teams

4 K. Pfeiffer, 5 L. Waldowski, 6 R. Vogt, 7 Rudolf Beyerlein, 8 E. Friebel, 9 Kurt Siebenhaar, 10 Theodor Schober, 11 Oskar Roth, 12 Arthur Stolz, 13 U. Schmitt, 14 Harald Muller, 15 Richard Griese, 16 K. Brehm (Coach: Anton Kartak)

1957 EuroBasket: finished 13th among 16 teams

3 Auxer, 4 Lamade, 5 Horst Stein, 6 R. Vogt, 7 Arthur Stolz, 8 Rigauer, 9 Gerhard Biller, 10 Ottmar, 11 Hans Brydniak, 12 Peter, 14 Klaus Schulz, 15 Richard Griese, 16 Scherer (Coach: Theodor Vychodil)

1961 EuroBasket: finished 16th among 19 teams

4 Hans Gruttner, 5 Horst Stein, 6 Richard Pull, 7 Arthur Stolz, 8 Hannes Neumann, 9 Hans Brydniak, 10 Klaus Weinand, 11 Oskar Roth, 12 Gerhard Biller, 13 Volker Heindel, 14 Klaus Schulz, 15 Jürgen Langhoff (Coach: Branimir Volfer)

1965 EuroBasket: finished 14th among 16 teams

4 Klaus Urmitzer, 5 Heinz Neef, 6 Hans-Dieter Niedlich, 7 Dietmar Kienast, 8 Hannes Neumann, 9 Bernd Roder, 10 Klaus Weinand, 11 Dieter Sarodnik, 12 Klaus Jungnickel, 13 Udo Wolfram, 14 Klaus Schulz, 15 Jorg Kruger (Coach: Yakovos Bilek)

1971 EuroBasket: finished 9th among 12 teams

4 Helmut Uhlig, 5 Rolf Dieter, 6 Dieter Pfeiffer, 7 Jurgen Loibl, 8 Gerd Brand, 9 Rainer Pethran, 10 Jochen Pollex, 11 Klaus Urmitzer, 12 Holger Geschwindner, 13 Jürgen Wohlers, 14 Dietrich Keller, 15 Norbert Thimm (Coach: Theodor Schober)

1972 Olympic Games: finished 12th among 16 teams

4 Helmut Uhlig, 5 Klaus Weinand, 6 Dieter Kuprella, 7 Karl Ampt, 8 Hans-Jörg Krüger, 9 Rainer Pethran, 10 Jochen Pollex, 11 Joachim Linnemann, 12 Holger Geschwindner, 13 Jürgen Wohlers, 14 Dietrich Keller, 15 Norbert Thimm (Coach: Theodor Schober)

1981 EuroBasket: finished 10th among 12 teams

4 Hans-Gunther Ludwig, 5 Joseph Waniek, 6 Sebastian Brunnert, 7 Matthias Strauss, 8 Jorg Heidrich, 9 Klaus Zander, 10 Michael Pappert, 11 Volkert Asshoff, 12 Holger Arpe, 13 Lutz Wadehn, 14 Armin Sowa, 15 Ingo Mendel (Coach: Terry Schofield)

1983 EuroBasket: finished 8th among 12 teams

4 Christoph Körner, 5 Frank Hudson, 6 Uwe Brauer, 7 Matthias Strauss, 8 Ulrich Peters, 9 Klaus Zander, 10 Michael Pappert, 11 Armin Sowa, 12 Detlef Schrempf, 13 Uwe Blab, 14 Lutz Wadehn, 15 Gunther Behnke (Coach: Chris Lee)

1984 Olympic Games: finished 8th among 12 teams

4 Christoph Körner, 5 Vladimir Kadlec, 6 Uwe Brauer, 7 Uwe Sauer, 8 Ulrich Peters, 9 Klaus Zander, 10 Michael Pappert, 11 Armin Sowa, 12 Detlef Schrempf, 13 Uwe Blab, 14 Ingo Mendel, Christian Welp (Coach: Ralph Klein)

1985 EuroBasket: finished 5th among 12 teams

4 Ulrich Peters, 5 Stephan Baeck, 6 Christoph Körner, 7 Uwe Sauer, 8 Michael Jackel, 9 Christian Welp, 10 Uwe Blab, 11 Armin Sowa, 12 Detlef Schrempf, 13 Lutz Wadehn, 14 Burkhard Schröder, 15 Gunther Behnke (Coach: Ralph Klein)

1986 FIBA World Cup: finished 13th among 24 teams

4 Ralf Risse, 5 Armin Andres, 6 Michael Koch, 7 Jan Villwock, 8 Rainer Greunke, 9 Holger Arpe, 10 Christian Welp, 11 Armin Sowa, 12 Hansi Gnad, 13 Lutz Wadehn, 14 Gunther Behnke, 15 Burkhard Schröder (Coach: Ralph Klein)

1987 EuroBasket: finished 6th among 12 teams

4 Armin Andres, 5 Christoph Körner, 6 Michael Koch, 7 Henning Harnisch, 8 Jens Kujawa, 9 Christian Welp, 10 Sven Meyer, 11 Michael Pappert, 12 Hansi Gnad, 13 Lutz Wadehn, 14 Gunther Behnke, 15 Michael Jackel (Coach: Ralph Klein)

As Germany

1992 Olympic Games: finished 7th among 12 teams

4 Gunther Behnke, 5 Henrik Rödl, 6 Armin Andres, 7 Stephan Baeck, 8 Arndt Neuhaus, 9 Henning Harnisch, 10 Uwe Blab, 11 Detlef Schrempf, 12 Hansi Gnad, 13 Kai Nurnberger, 14 Jens Kujawa, 15 Michael Jackel (Coach: Svetislav Pešić)

1993 EuroBasket: finished (gold) among 16 teams

4 Moritz Kleine-Brockhoff, 5 Henrik Rödl, 6 Michael Koch, 7 Christian Welp (MVP), 8 Teoman Öztürk, 9 Henning Harnisch, 10 Gunther Behnke, 11 Stephan Baeck, 12 Hansi Gnad, 13 Kai Nürnberger, 14 Jens Kujawa, 15 Michael Jackel (Coach: Svetislav Pešić)

1994 FIBA World Cup: finished 12th among 16 teams

4 Henning Harnisch, 5 Michael Koch, 6 Sascha Hupmann, 7 Henrik Rödl, 8 Hansi Gnad, 9 Gunther Behnke, 10 Kai Nurnberger, 11 Patrick King, 12 Detlef Musch, 13 Arndt Neuhaus, 14 Oliver Herkelmann, 15 Mike Knorr (Coach: Dirk Bauermann)

1995 EuroBasket: finished 11th among 14 teams

4 Ingo Freyer, 5 Henrik Rödl, 6 Michael Koch, 7 Detlef Musch, 8 Denis Wucherer, 9 Christian Welp, 10 Teoman Öztürk, 11 Patrick King, 12 Hansi Gnad, 13 Kai Nürnberger, 14 Ademola Okulaja, 15 Michael Knörr (Coach: Vladislav Lučić)

1997 EuroBasket: finished 12th among 16 teams

4 Henrik Rödl, 5 Jörg Lütcke, 6 Gerrit Terdenge, 7 Vladimir Bogojević, 8 Denis Wucherer, 9 Henning Harnisch, 10 Sascha Hupmann, 11 Jürgen Malbeck, 12 Patrick Femerling, 13 Ademola Okulaja, 14 Tim Nees, 15 Alexander Kühl (Coach: Vladislav Lučić)

1999 EuroBasket: finished 7th among 16 teams

4 Henrik Rödl, 5 Jörg Lütcke, 6 Kai Nürnberger, 7 Vladimir Bogojević, 8 Denis Wucherer, 9 Drazan Tomic, 10 Patrick Femerling, 11 Gerrit Terdenge, 12 Stephen Arigbabu, 13 Ademola Okulaja, 14 Tim Nees, 15 Dirk Nowitzki (Coach: Henrik Dettmann)

2001 EuroBasket: finished 4th among 16 teams

4 Mithat Demirel, 5 Ademola Okulaja, 6 Robert Garrett, 7 Marko Pešić, 8 Stefano Garris, 9 Drazan Tomic, 10 Marvin Willoughby, 11 Stipo Papić, 12 Stephen Arigbabu, 13 Patrick Femerling, 14 Dirk Nowitzki, 15 Shawn Bradley (Coach: Henrik Dettmann)

2002 FIBA World Cup: finished (bronze) among 16 teams

4 Mithat Demirel, 5 Ademola Okulaja, 6 Jörg Lütcke, 7 Marko Pešić, 8 Pascal Roller, 9 Henrik Rödl, 10 Misan Haldin, 11 Stefano Garris, 12 Stephen Arigbabu, 13 Patrick Femerling, 14 Dirk Nowitzki (MVP), 15 Robert Maras (Coach: Henrik Dettmann)

2003 EuroBasket: finished 11th among 16 teams

4 Mithat Demirel, 5 Ademola Okulaja, 6 Jörg Lütcke, 7 Marko Pešić, 8 Sven Schultze, 9 Steffen Hamann, 10 Misan Haldin, 11 Stefano Garris, 12 Stephen Arigbabu, 13 Patrick Femerling, 14 Dirk Nowitzki, 15 Robert Maras (Coach: Henrik Dettmann)

2005 EuroBasket: finished (silver) among 16 teams

4 Mithat Demirel, 5 Robert Garrett, 6 Demond Greene, 7 Marko Pešić, 8 Denis Wucherer, 9 Pascal Roller, 10 Misan Haldin, 11 Sven Schultze, 12 Stephen Arigbabu, 13 Patrick Femerling, 14 Dirk Nowitzki (MVP), 15 Robert Maras (Coach: Dirk Bauermann)

2006 FIBA World Cup: finished 8th among 24 teams

4 Mithat Demirel, 5 Ademola Okulaja, 6 Sven Schultze, 7 Robert Garrett, 8 Johannes Herber, 9 Steffen Hamann, 10 Demond Greene, 11 Pascal Roller, 12 Guido Grünheid, 13 Patrick Femerling, 14 Dirk Nowitzki, 15 Jan Jagla (Coach: Dirk Bauermann)

2007 EuroBasket: finished 5th among 16 teams

4 Mithat Demirel, 5 Ademola Okulaja, 6 Stephen Arigbabu, 7 Robert Garrett, 8 Johannes Herber, 9 Steffen Hamann, 10 Demond Greene, 11 Pascal Roller, 12 Guido Grünheid, 13 Patrick Femerling, 14 Dirk Nowitzki, 15 Jan Jagla (Coach: Dirk Bauermann)

2008 Olympic Games: finished 10th among 12 teams

4 Tim Ohlbrecht, 5 Philip Zwiener, 6 Sven Schultze, 7 Robert Garrett, 8 Konrad Wysocki, 9 Steffen Hamann, 10 Demond Greene, 11 Pascal Roller, 12 Chris Kaman, 13 Patrick Femerling, 14 Dirk Nowitzki, 15 Jan Jagla (Coach: Dirk Bauermann)

2009 EuroBasket: finished 11th among 16 teams

4 Lucca Staiger, 5 Heiko Schaffartzik, 6 Sven Schultze, 7 Tim Ohlbrecht, 8 Konrad Wysocki, 9 Steffen Hamann, 10 Demond Greene, 11 Tibor Pleiß, 12 Elias Harris, 13 Patrick Femerling, 14 Robin Benzing, 15 Jan Jagla (Coach: Dirk Bauermann)

2010 FIBA World Cup: finished 17th among 24 teams

4 Lucca Staiger, 5 Heiko Schaffartzik, 6 Per Günther, 7 Tim Ohlbrecht, 8 Christopher McNaughton, 9 Steffen Hamann, 10 Demond Greene, 11 Tibor Pleiß, 12 Elias Harris, 13 Philipp Schwethelm, 14 Robin Benzing, 15 Jan Jagla (Coach: Dirk Bauermann)

2011 EuroBasket: finished 9th among 24 teams

4 Robin Benzing, 5 Johannes Herber, 6 Steffen Hamann, 7 Sven Schultze, 8 Heiko Schaffartzik, 9 Tim Ohlbrecht, 10 Philipp Schwethelm, 11 Tibor Pleiß, 12 Chris Kaman, 13 Lucca Staiger, 14 Dirk Nowitzki, 15 Jan-Hendrik Jagla (Coach: Dirk Bauermann)

2013 EuroBasket: finished 17th among 24 teams

4 Alex King, 5 Niels Giffey, 6 Per Günther, 7 Philip Zwiener, 8 Heiko Schaffartzik (C), 9 Karsten Tadda, 10 Lucca Staiger, 11 Tibor Pleiß, 12 Robin Benzing, 13 Bastian Doreth, 14 Andreas Seiferth, 15 Maik Zirbes (Coach: Frank Menz)

2015 EuroBasket: finished 18th among 24 teams

4 Maodo Lô, 5 Niels Giffey, 7 Alex King, 8 Heiko Schaffartzik (C), Karsten Tadda, 9 Tibor Pleiß, 12 Robin Benzing, 14 Dirk Nowitzki,
17 Dennis Schröder, 21 Paul Zipser, 25 Anton Gavel, 77 Johannes Voigtmann (Coach: Chris Fleming)

2017 EuroBasket: finished 6th among 24 teams

4 Maodo Lô, 7 Johannes Voigtmann, 8 Lucca Staiger, 9 Karsten Tadda, 10 Daniel Theis, 12 Robin Benzing (C), 17 Dennis Schröder,
18 İsmet Akpınar, 22 Danilo Barthel, 32 Johannes Thiemann, 33 Patrick Heckmann, 55 Isaiah Hartenstein (Coach: Chris Fleming)

2019 FIBA World Cup: finished 18th among 32 teams

4 Maodo Lô, 5 Niels Giffey, 7 Johannes Voigtmann, 8 İsmet Akpınar, 10 Daniel Theis, 12 Robin Benzing (C), 17 Dennis Schröder,
21 Paul Zipser, 22 Danilo Barthel, 24 Maxi Kleber, 32 Johannes Thiemann, 42 Andreas Obst (Coach: Henrik Rödl)

2020 Olympic Games: finished 8th among 12 teams

0 Isaac Bonga, 1 Joshiko Saibou, 4 Maodo Lô, 5 Niels Giffey, 6 Jan Wimberg, 7 Johannes Voigtmann, 12 Robin Benzing (C),
13 Moritz Wagner, 19 Lukas Wank, 22 Danilo Barthel, 32 Johannes Thiemann, 42 Andreas Obst (Coach: Henrik Rödl)

2022 EuroBasket: finished (bronze) among 24 teams

4 Maodo Lô, 5 Niels Giffey, 6 Nick Weiler-Babb, 7 Johannes Voigtmann, 9 Franz Wagner, 10 Daniel Theis, 17 Dennis Schröder (C),
18 Jonas Wohlfarth-Bottermann, 21 Justus Hollatz, 32 Johannes Thiemann, 42 Andreas Obst, 43 Christian Sengfelder
(Coach: Gordon Herbert)

2023 FIBA World Cup: finished (gold) among 32 teams

0 Isaac Bonga, 4 Maodo Lô, 5 Niels Giffey, 7 Johannes Voigtmann, 9 Franz Wagner, 10 Daniel Theis, 13 Moritz Wagner,
17 Dennis Schröder (C) & (MVP), 21 Justus Hollatz, 32 Johannes Thiemann, 42 Andreas Obst, 44 David Krämer
(Coach: Gordon Herbert)

2024 Olympic Games: finished 4th among 12 teams

0 Isaac Bonga, 1 Oscar da Silva, 4 Maodo Lô, 5 Niels Giffey, 6 Nick Weiler-Babb, 7 Johannes Voigtmann, 9 Franz Wagner,
10 Daniel Theis, 13 Moritz Wagner, 17 Dennis Schröder (C), 32 Johannes Thiemann, 42 Andreas Obst (Coach: Gordon Herbert)

2025 EuroBasket: finished (gold) among 24 teams

0 Isaac Bonga, 1 Oscar da Silva, 4 Maodo Lô, 5 Tristan da Silva, 7 Johannes Voigtmann, 9 Franz Wagner, 10 Daniel Theis,
17 Dennis Schröder (C) & (MVP), 21 Justus Hollatz, 32 Johannes Thiemann, 34 Leon Kratzer, 42 Andreas Obst
(Coach: Álex Mumbrú & Alan Ibrahimagić)

== Media coverage ==
Germany's matches are currently televised by Deutsche Telekom and ProSiebenSat.1.

== Kit supplier ==
=== Manufacturer ===
- 2014–2025: Peak
- 2026–present: Adidas

=== Sponsor ===
- 2014–present: ING DiBa
- 2022–present: TipWin

== See also ==
- Sport in Germany
- Germany women's national basketball team
- Germany men's national under-20 basketball team
- Germany men's national under-19 basketball team
- Germany men's national under-17 basketball team
- Germany men's national 3x3 team
