= BSC Saturn Köln =

Saturn Köln
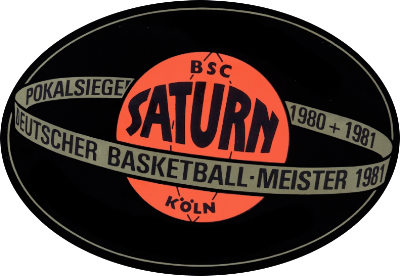
- Leagues: Basketball Bundesliga
- Founded: 1977
- Dissolved: 1993
- History: BSC Saturn Köln; 1977-1989; Galatasaray Köln; 1989–1990; BSC Saturn Köln; 1990–1991
- Arena: Müngersdorfer Sporthalle
- Capacity: 1000
- Championships: 4 German Championships; 3 German Cups

BSC Saturn 77 Köln, commonly known as Saturn Köln or Saturn Cologne, was a professional basketball club based in the fourth-largest city of Germany, Cologne. Established in 1977, Saturn won its first Basketball Bundesliga title in 1981, crowning themselves German champions. Saturn went on to win four titles in the 80s, as well as three German Cup titles. In 1993, the club was dissolved.

== History ==
The club originated in 1977 from the divested basketball department of ASV Köln. Legally, the spin-off took place, however, only in 1978. The basketball department of ASV Köln played already from 1969–70 to 1971–72, in the season 1973–74 and 1975 to spin-off in the National Basketball League.

Saturn have won four German Championships and three national Cup all the titles in the glory days of 80s. The main sponsor was since June 1977 Fritz Waffenschmidt, then owner of the Saturn stores. The sale of the Saturn stores on the Kaufhof department store group in March 1984 it was the end of the funding for the club to the top basketball ended abruptly in Cologne.

In the 1988/89 season, Saturn reached the Bundesliga semi-finals, losing to eventual champions Bayreuth. Attempts to find a new main donor were unsuccessful for a long time. In the summer of 1989, the Turkish club Galatasaray stepped in as a financier with a Turkish bank in tow and wanted to take the club to the top European level and The club was renamed as Galatasaray Cologne. It was an attempt to win over Turkish people in the Cologne area with new signings in 1989: Jackel was brought and Lutz Wadehn and Kai Nürnberger were also signed. However, from October 1989, none of the agreed payments were made to employees and players.

The club filed for insolvency in February 1990, and the last Bundesliga season of 1989/90 ended with a semi-final elimination against Bayreuth again. The debts were amounted to around 700,000 German marks, and in June 1990 the club gave up its right to participate in the Bundesliga. In 1993 the association was formally dissolved.

Highlights in the history of Saturn Köln for the European competitions came to late 80s in FIBA European Champions Cup where they arrived until quarter final group stage in 1987–88 season and face the best European basketball clubs of the era as Partizan, Aris, Tracer Milano, Maccabi Tel Aviv, FC Barcelona, Orthez and Nashua Den Bosch. The next season Saturn eliminated in the round of 16 by the Dutch Nashua Den Bosch. Also Saturn after a significant qualification against Monaco arrived until quarter final group stage in 1983–84 FIBA European Cup Winners' Cup where they made excellent performances and eliminated with a 3 wins-3 defeats record by Simac Milano and Cibona.

The Sports and Olympic Museum in Cologne opened an exhibition about the BSC Saturn Cologne in November 2008.

== Titles and achievements ==
German League

- Winners (4): 1980–81, 1981–82, 1986–87, 1987–88
- Runners-up (3): 1982-83, 1983–84, 1985–86

German Cup

- Winners (3): 1979–80, 1980–81, 1982–83
- Runners-up (4): 1980-81, 1981–82, 1983–84, 1987-88

== European participations ==
The club has competed for 6 seasons in European competitions organized by FIBA Europe from 1981 until 1990.

- FIBA Euroleague/Suproleague : 4 times (1981–82, 1982–83, 1987–88, 1988-89)
- Cup Winners' Cup: 1 time (1983–84)
- Korac Cup: 1 time (1989–90)

== Notable players ==
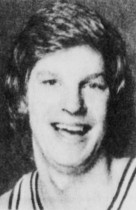
Johnny Neumann

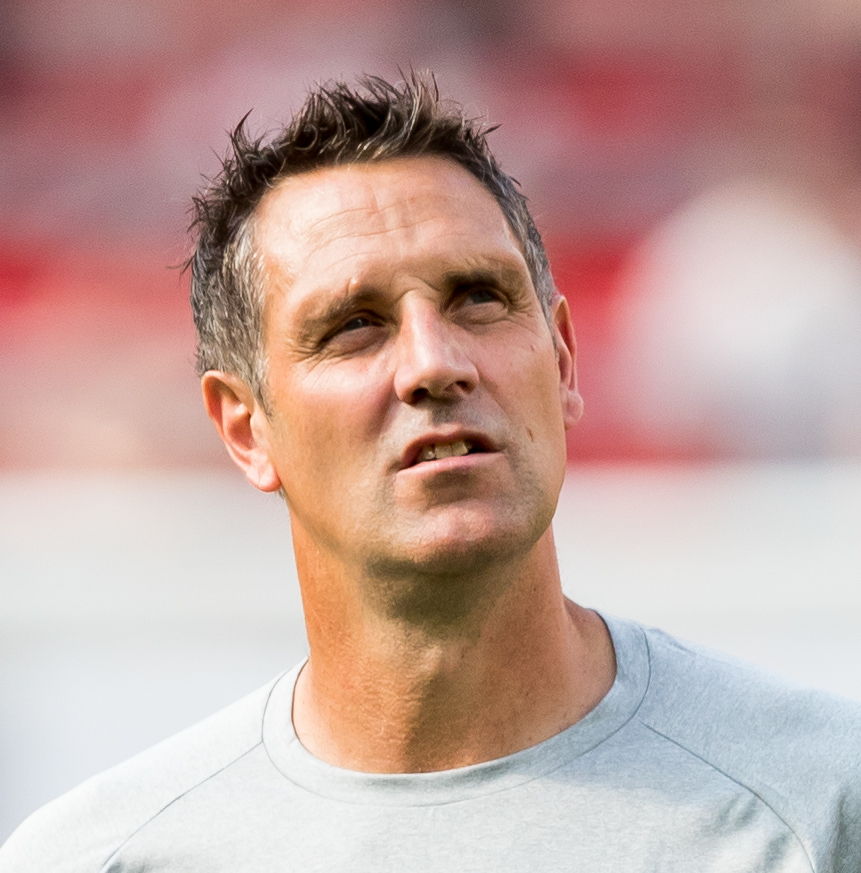
Hansi Gnad

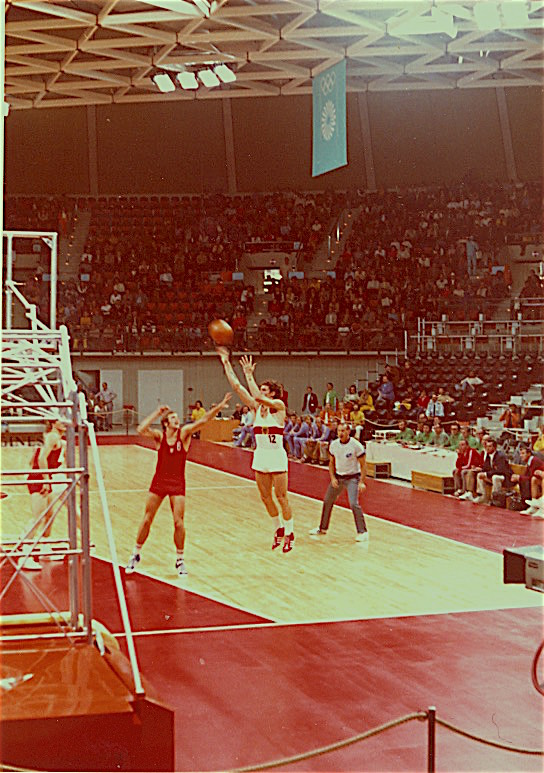
Geschwindner

Note: Flags indicate national team eligibility at FIBA-sanctioned events. Players may hold other non-FIBA nationalities not displayed.

Criteria

To appear in this section a player must have either:

- Set a club record or won an individual award while at the club
- Played at least one official international match for their national team at any time
- Played at least one official NBA match at any time.

Germany:

- (Germany) Stephan Baeck
- (Germany) Holger Geschwindner
- (Germany) Hansi Gnad
- (Germany) Michael Jackel
- (Germany) Michael Pappert
- (Germany) Uwe Sauer
- (Germany) Horst Wolf
- (Germany) Klaus Zander
- (Germany) Kai Nürnberger

Europe:

- (Socialist Federal Republic of Yugoslavia) Dragan Kapičić

USA:

- (United States) Johnny Neumann

== Head coaches ==
- (United States) Bruce Randall (1979–80)
- (Germany) Theodor Schober (1980–82)
- (Germany) Peter Krusmann (1982–83)
- (Israel) Ralph Klein: (1983–1986)
- (United States) Tony DiLeo: (1986–1988)
