= Ulrich Peters =

Ulrich Peters may refer to:

- Ulrich Peters (canoeist)
- Ulrich Peters (basketball)
