= Christopher McNaughton =

German-American basketball player (born 1982)

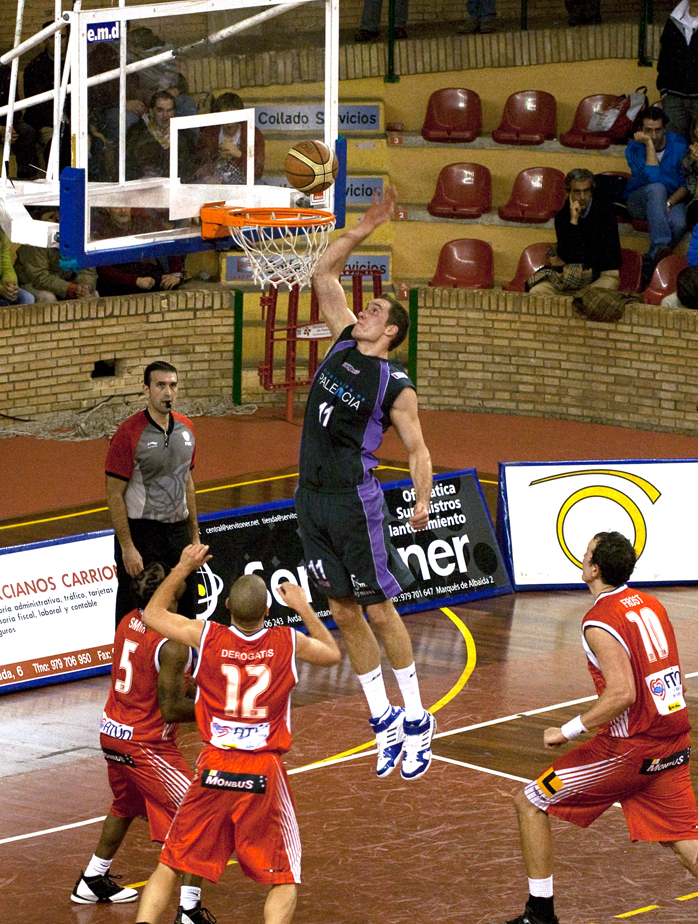
- McNaughton, with Palencia Baloncesto in 2009

Personal information
- Born: October 11, 1982 (age 44) Nuremberg, West Germany
- Listed height: 6 ft 11 in (2.11 m)
- Listed weight: 242 lb (110 kg)

Career information
- College: Bucknell (2003–2007)
- NBA draft: 2007: undrafted
- Playing career: 2001–present
- Position: Center

Career history
- 2001–2003: TSV Tröster Breitengüßbach
- 2007: L'Hospitalet
- 2007–2008: Prat
- 2008–2009: Palencia Baloncesto
- 2009–2010: BG Göttingen
- 2010–2011: EWE Baskets Oldenburg
- 2011–2012: Eisbären Bremerhaven
- 2012–2014: s.Oliver Baskets
- 2014–2016: MHP Riesen Ludwigsburg

Career highlights
- EuroChallenge champion (2010)

Christopher George McNaughton (born October 11, 1982) is a German-American (with an American father and German mother, respectively) professional basketball player who last played for MHP Riesen Ludwigsburg of the Basketball Bundesliga (BBL). He competed with the German national basketball team at the 2010 FIBA World Championship.

== College career ==
McNaughton played NCAA college basketball at Bucknell University. McNaughton was a four-year starter at center for the Bison and averaged over 12 points and five rebounds per game for his career. McNaughton was a three-time All-Patriot League selection and was named the Patriot League Men's Basketball Scholar-Athlete of the year three times. While with the Bison, McNaughton helped lead the team to two consecutive first round victories (Bucknell's only two NCAA Tournament victories to date) in the 2005 and 2006 NCAA Men's Division I Basketball Tournament. McNaughton was the hero of the 2005 upset victory over #3 seeded Kansas Jayhawks when he banked in a hook shot with ten seconds left for the 64-63 victory.

== Professional career ==
Despite his successful college career, McNaughton received little interest from professional teams in his native Germany. Instead, McNaughton spent three years for three teams in the third tier of Spanish basketball. Finally, he was picked up by Bundesliga side BG Göttingen for the 2009–10 season. With the team, he was a surprise star, averaging 7.4 points per game while helping the team to a third place regular season finish in the Bundesliga. McNaughton scored a game high 22 points while coming off the bench in BG Göttingen's victory in the final of the EuroChallenge 2009–10.

Following his successful 2009-10 campaign, McNaughton was signed to a two-year deal by fellow Bundesliga side EWE Baskets Oldenburg, but was released at the end of the 2010-11 season.

He played the 2011-12 season with the Bremerhaven Eisbaren where he averaged 12 points and 5 rebounds and was selected to the National All Star Team. He then spent the next two seasons in Wurzburg, where he was named team captain for the second season.

In June 2014, he signed a two-year deal with MHP Riesen Ludwigsburg.

== International career ==
McNaughton first played with the German national basketball team as a junior for the Under-20 national team. McNaughton was named to the German senior national team for the first time right before the 2010 FIBA World Championship in Turkey following his strong 2009-10 season.
