= Sven Schultze =

German basketball player (born 1978)

- Schultze in 2026

Personal information
- Born: July 11, 1978 (age 48) Bamberg, West Germany
- Listed height: 6 ft 9 in (2.06 m)
- Listed weight: 242 lb (110 kg)

Career information
- Playing career: 1995–2015
- Position: Power forward / center
- Number: 6

Career history
- 1995–1998: Brose Baskets
- 1998–2002: Alba Berlin
- 2002–2005: Bayer Giants Leverkusen
- 2005–2007: Olimpia Milano
- 2007–2008: Amatori Udine
- 2008–2009: Olympia Larissa
- 2009: Junior Casale
- 2009–2010: Biella
- 2010: Ferrara
- 2010–2014: Alba Berlin
- 2014–2015: Eisbären Bremerhaven

Career highlights
- 4× German League champion (1999–2002); 4× German Cup winner (1999, 2002, 2013, 2014)

Sven Schultze (born July 11, 1978) is a retired German professional basketball player. Schultze played as both a power forward and as center. He is 2.06 m (6 ft 9 in) in height and he weighs 110 kg (240 lb). His last team was Eisbären Bremerhaven of the German League, in the 2014–15 season.

== National team career ==
From 2000 to 2011, Schultze was a member of the German national basketball team and played 121 games with them.
