= Alexander Kühl =

German basketball player (born 1973)

Personal information
- Born: January 7, 1973 (age 53) Rendsburg, West Germany
- Listed height: 7 ft 2 in (2.18 m)
- Listed weight: 300 lb (136 kg)

Career information
- College: Palm Beach State (1993–1995); Charlotte (1995–1997)
- NBA draft: 1997: undrafted
- Playing career: 1997–2003
- Position: Center

Career history
- 1997–1998: Bayer Leverkusen
- 1998–1999: Aris Thessaloniki
- 1999–2000: Near East BC
- 2000–2001: Poliform Cantù
- 2001–2002: Peristeri BC
- 2002–2003: Air Avellino
- 2003: CSP Limoges

Alexander Kühl (Kuehl) (born January 7, 1973) is a former 7' 2", 300-lbs. professional basketball player born in Rendsburg, West Germany. He played college basketball in the US at Charlotte after playing 2 years at Palm Beach Community College (now Palm Beach State College). After graduating from UNC Charlotte, he played professionally in Europe for 6 years.

== Pre-professional career ==
Kühl started his collegiate career at Palm Beach Community College, where he played from 1993–1995.

In his freshman year, Kühl posted averages of 8.7 points and 7.8 rebounds per game in 32 games.

As a sophomore, he also played in 32 games and averaged 12.2 points and 9.4 rebounds per game.

He played and started in 64 straight games for PBCC and was named to the All-Southern Conference JC Team his sophomore season.

After graduating from PBCC, he went on to play at Charlotte from 1995–1997.

As a junior, he moved into the starting lineup in his first year at Charlotte before suffering a broken foot in the season's 17th game. He was lost for the remainder of the season, missing 12 games. In the 17 games he played, he averaged 6.0 points and 5.1 rebounds, adding 17 blocked shots.

As a senior, he made a successful return from a broken foot (and two subsequent foot surgeries) to play and start in 31 games for the 49ers, averaging 6.5 points, 7.9 rebounds and 1.55 blocks per game. He had 11 double-figure rebounding games and reached double figures in scoring five times that season.

He accounted for 7 points, 6 rebounds and 3 blocks against the Georgetown Hoyas, (a team that included Jahidi White and Victor Page) in the 49ers' 79-67 win in the first round of the 1997 NCAA Tournament.

He closed out his collegiate career with 9 points and 11 rebounds in a 77-58 loss to the Utah Utes (a team that included Keith Van Horn, Michael Doleac, Andre Miller and Hanno Möttola) in the second round.

In 48 career games with the 49ers, Kühl posted averages of 6.3 points, 6.9 rebounds and 1.35 blocks per game. He currently ranks ninth all-time on the school's blocked shots list with 65. His 48 blocks as a senior is the seventh-best single-season total at Charlotte. When he was in the lineup the 49ers sported a 32-16 record.

At the Portsmouth Invitational Tournament, he averaged 5.3 ppg and 5.3 rpg and was drafted in 3rd Round of USBL draft in 1997 by Philadelphia.

== Professional career ==
Kühl played professionally for 7 different teams in his 6-year career.

He started out playing for Bayer Leverkusen during the 1997–98 season, where he averaged 3.7 points and 4.0 rebounds. During EuroCup played that year, he averaged 4.9 points and 5.3 rebounds in 10 games.

He then played for Aris Thessaloniki during the 1998–99 season, averaging 3.1 points and 3.7 rebounds per game in the Greek Championship. That year Aris Thessaloniki also played in the Saporta Cup where Kühl averaged 2.6 points and 2.5 rebounds in 15 games.

He then moved to Athens to play for Near East BC for the 1999–2000 season, averaging 2.9 points and 4.8 rebounds per game. Near East BC also played in the Korać Cup that season, where Kühl averaged 0.7 points and 2.7 rebounds in 6 games.

For the 2000–01 season he moved to Italy to play for Poliform Cantù and averaged 5.7 points and 4.4 rebounds in 32 games

Kühl returned to Athens, Greece for the 2001–02 season, where he played for Peristeri BC, averaging 2.9 points and 2.9 rebounds in 24 games in the Greek Championship, and in Euroleague play that year he averagred 2.2 points and 1.5 rebounds in 8 games.

The following season, 2002–03, he went back to Italy to play for Air Avellino where he had averages of 2.1 points and 2.1 rebounds in 26 games, but left that team in March 2003 and finished the season in CSP Limoges, averaging a career high 6.8 points and 8.0 rebounds in 9 games.

Kühl also played in the 'Rocky Mountain Review', an NBA summer league, in 2000 and 2001 as a member of the Denver Nuggets.

== International career ==
Kühl was a member of the Germany national basketball team in 1996 and 1997. He was part of the team which played in the EuroBasket 1997 tournament in Barcelona, where they finished in 12th place.
