= Lucca Staiger =

German basketball player (born 1988)

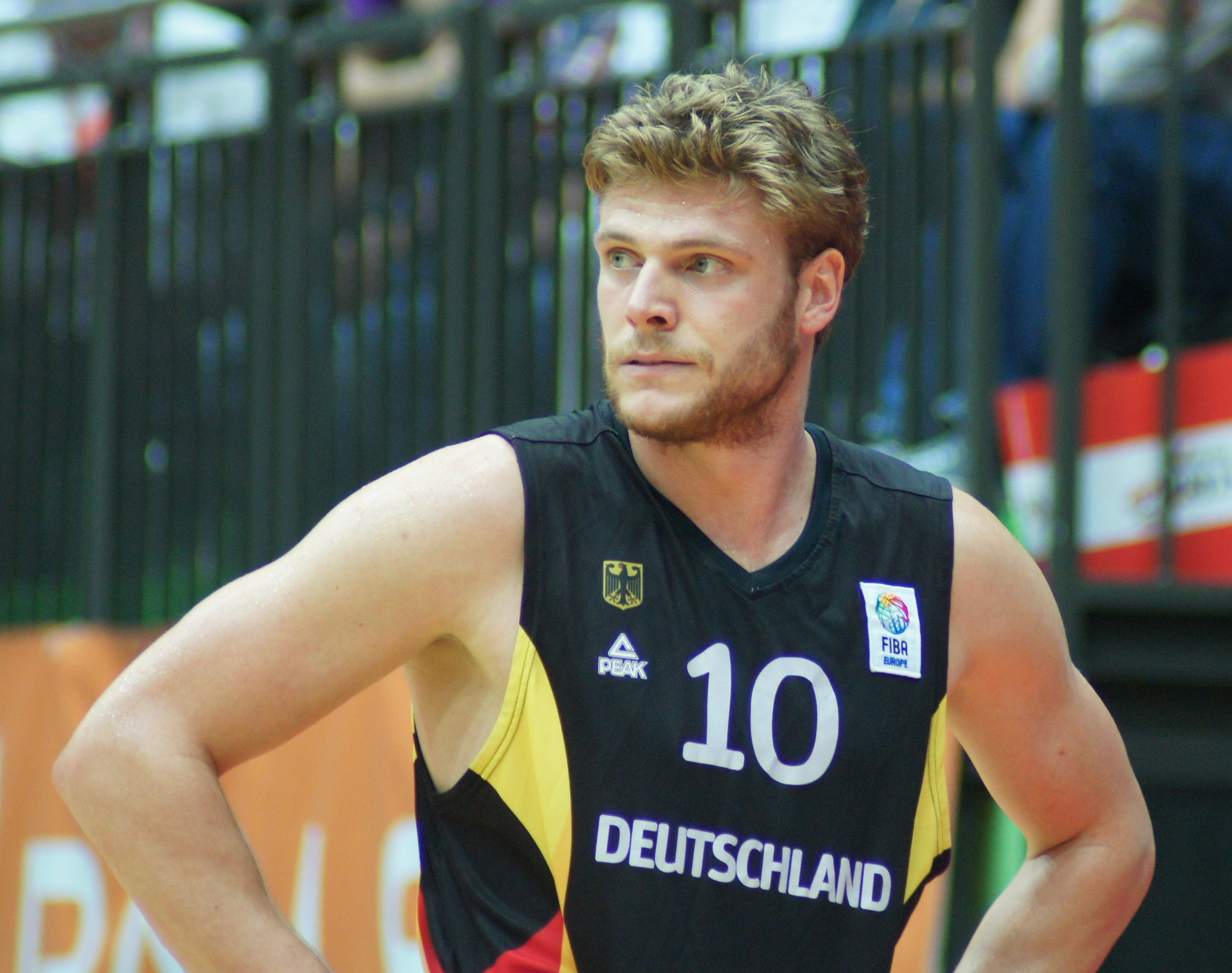
- Staiger with Germany in 2014

Personal information
- Born: June 14, 1988 (age 38) Blaustein, West Germany
- Listed height: 1.96 m (6 ft 5 in)
- Listed weight: 93 kg (205 lb)

Career information
- College: Iowa State (2008–2010)
- NBA draft: 2010: undrafted
- Playing career: 2010–2020
- Position: Shooting guard
- Number: 8

Career history
- 2010–2012: Alba Berlin
- 2012–2013: Neckar Riesen Ludwigsburg
- 2013–2015: Bayern Munich
- 2015–2018: Brose Bamberg
- 2018–2019: Canarias
- 2019–2020: Löwen Braunschweig

Lucca Staiger (born June 14, 1988) is a German former professional basketball player. Standing at 6 ft 5 in (1.96 m), he played the shooting guard position. He played collegiate basketball for Iowa State University.

== Junior career ==
Staiger was one of the top junior players in Germany. He led his high school team to the 2005 German High School Championship while averaging 24.2 points, 5.6 rebounds, and 6.2 assists. He spent his senior season at Decatur Christian High School in Illinois, averaging 13.3 points, 4.2 rebounds, and 2.4 assists per game en route to being selected to play in the Illinois Premier Basketball High School All-Star Game. As a high school player, he also competed with the German national basketball team at the 2005 FIBA Europe Under-18 Championship and 2006 FIBA Europe Under-20 Championship.

== College career ==
Staiger was declared ineligible for his freshman season with the Cyclones and was forced to sit out the entire season and lose a year of eligibility. He came back strong during his sophomore season, averaging 8.2 points and 24 minutes per game, while slowly becoming a larger part of the rotation throughout the season. He scored a career high 24 points in an early season loss to Drake University while hitting eight three-pointers. He was named Big 12 Rookie of the Week twice during the season.

Following the season, Staiger competed with the senior German national basketball team for the first time at EuroBasket 2009. He averaged 5 points per game over the team's six games, including a team-high 14 in the team's second-round game versus Macedonia.

On January 19, 2010, Staiger announced he was leaving Iowa State, effective immediately, to pursue a professional career in Europe.

== Professional career ==
Coming out of the college, Staiger joined the German BBL team Alba Berlin. In 2012, he joined the league rivals Neckar Riesen Ludwigsburg. After just one year, on June 25, 2013, it was announced that he would be joining Bayern Munich.

On July 8, 2015, Staiger signed a contract with Brose Bamberg. He parted ways with the team in July 2018. On August 6, 2018, Staiger signed a one-year deal with Iberostar Tenerife of the Liga ACB.

On December 13, 2019, he has signed with Löwen Braunschweig of the German Basketball Bundesliga (BBL).
