= Collin Welp =

American-German basketball player

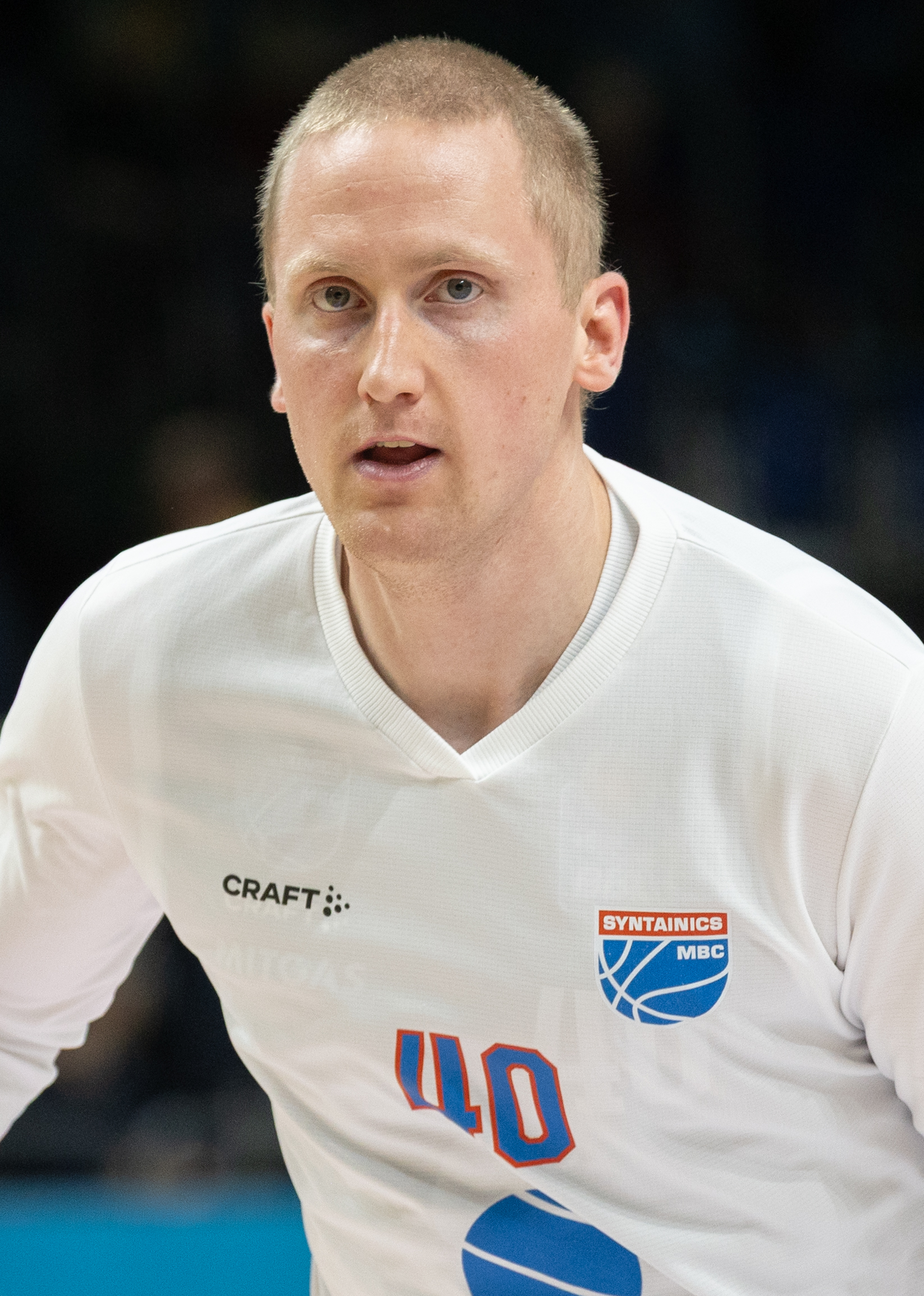

No. 40 – Mitteldeutscher BC
- Position: Power forward
- League: Basketball Bundesliga

Personal information
- Born: December 15, 1998 (age 27) Seattle, Washington, U.S.
- Listed height: 2.06 m (6 ft 9 in)
- Listed weight: 102 kg (225 lb)

Career information
- High school: Seattle Prep (Seattle, Washington)
- College: UC Irvine (2017–2022)
- NBA draft: 2022: undrafted
- Playing career: 2022–present

Career history
- 2022–2024: s.Oliver Würzburg
- 2024–2025: BG Göttingen
- 2025–present: Mitteldeutscher BC

Collin Jay Welp (born December 15, 1998) is an American-German professional basketball player for Mitteldeutscher BC of the German Basketball Bundesliga (BBL). He plays the power forward position.

== Early life and high school career ==
Collin Welp was born on December 15, 1998, in Seattle, Washington. As a youth Welp played multiple sports, until he focused on basketball at Seattle Prep.

In November 2016, during Welp's senior year in high school, he signed a national letter of intent with UC Irvine.

== College career ==
After being redshirted as a freshman during the 2017–18 season for UC Irvine, Welp eventually played the next four years at the school. He finished his collegiate career with averages of 12.3 points, 5.9 rebounds and 1.4 assists per game.

== Professional career ==
In July 2022, Welp began his professional career by signing a two-year contract with German club s.Oliver Würzburg. Following his stint with Würzburg, Welp moved to club BG Göttingen, ahead of the 2024–25 Bundesliga campaign. In Welp's lone season with Göttingen, the club endured tough defeats, while failing to avoid relegation. After the season, in June 2025, Welp remained in the first division by signing a one-year deal with Mitteldeutscher BC.

== National team career ==
In November 2025, Welp was called up to the Germany national team for the first time. He made his debut in a 2027 FIBA World Cup qualifier, picking up four points and three rebounds in a win against Cyprus.

== Personal life ==
Collin Welp is the son of the late former Germany national team legend Christian Welp. His younger brother Nic Welp also plays basketball professionally.
