= Ralph Klein (basketball) =

Israeli basketball player and coach

Ralph Klein רלף קליין
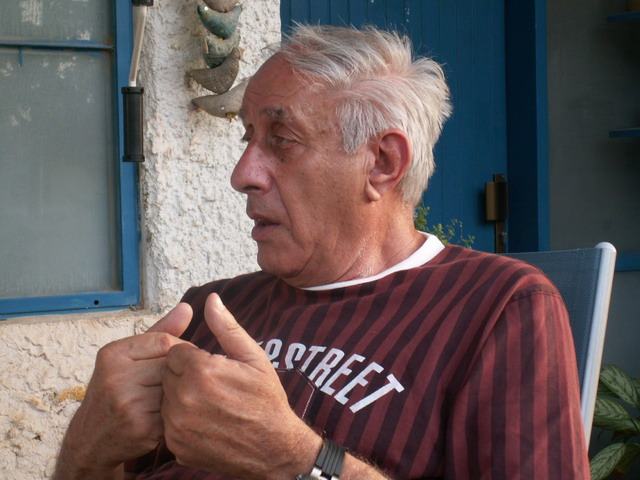
- Klein in 2006

Personal information
- Born: July 29, 1931 Berlin, Germany
- Died: August 7, 2008 (aged 77) Tel HaShomer, Israel
- Listed height: 6 ft 3.75 in (1.92 m)

Career information
- Playing career: 1952–1964
- Position: Shooting guard
- Coaching career: 1964–2008

Career history

Playing
- 1952–1964: Maccabi Tel Aviv

Coaching
- 1964–1965: Hapoel Gan Shmuel
- 1965–1966: Hapoel Haifa
- 1967–1968: Hapoel Tel Aviv
- 1969–1972: Maccabi Tel Aviv
- 1972–1973: Hapoel Jerusalem
- 1974–1975: Hapoel Haifa
- 1975–1980: Maccabi Tel Aviv
- 1977–1983: Israel
- 1981–1983: Maccabi Tel Aviv
- 1983–1986: Saturn Köln
- 1983–1987: West Germany
- 1987–1988: Maccabi Tel Aviv
- 1991: Hapoel Gvat
- 1992–1993: Hapoel Tel Aviv
- 1995-1996: Maccabi Tel Aviv
- 1996: Hapoel Eilat
- 1997: Hapoel Holon
- 1998: Maccabi Netanya
- 2006–2008: Elizur Elkana

Career highlights
- As player: 8× Israeli League champion (1954, 1955, 1957–1959, 1962–1964); 6× Israeli State Cup winner (1956, 1958, 1959, 1961, 1963, 1964); As head coach: EuroLeague champion (1977); German Cup champion (1983); 11× Israeli League champion (1970–1972, 1976–1980, 1982, 1983, 1988, 1995); 10× Israeli State Cup winner (1970–1972, 1977–1980, 1982, 1983, 1993); Israel Prize (2006)
Medals
Representing Israel
Men's basketball
FIBA EuroBasket
Silver medal – second place	1979 Italy

Ralph Klein, also known as Rafael "Ralph" Ram (Hebrew: רלף קליין; July 29, 1931 – August 7, 2008) was an Israeli professional basketball player and coach. In Israel, he was known as "Mr. Basketball".

== Early life ==
Klein was born in Berlin, during the time of the Weimar Republic to an affluent Hungarian Jewish family that returned to Budapest before the outbreak of World War II. His father was murdered in Auschwitz, but he and his family survived thanks to efforts by Raoul Wallenberg.

== Basketball playing career ==
=== Club career ===
After the war, at the age of 16, Klein began playing football, but later moved to basketball, and played in the Hungarian national league. In 1951, he immigrated to Israel, with his mother.

After serving in the Israeli navy, he joined Maccabi Tel Aviv, with which he played in more than 160 games, through 1964. With Maccabi Tel Aviv, he scored 2,701 total points, and won eight Israeli Super League national championships and six Israeli State Cups.

=== National team career ===
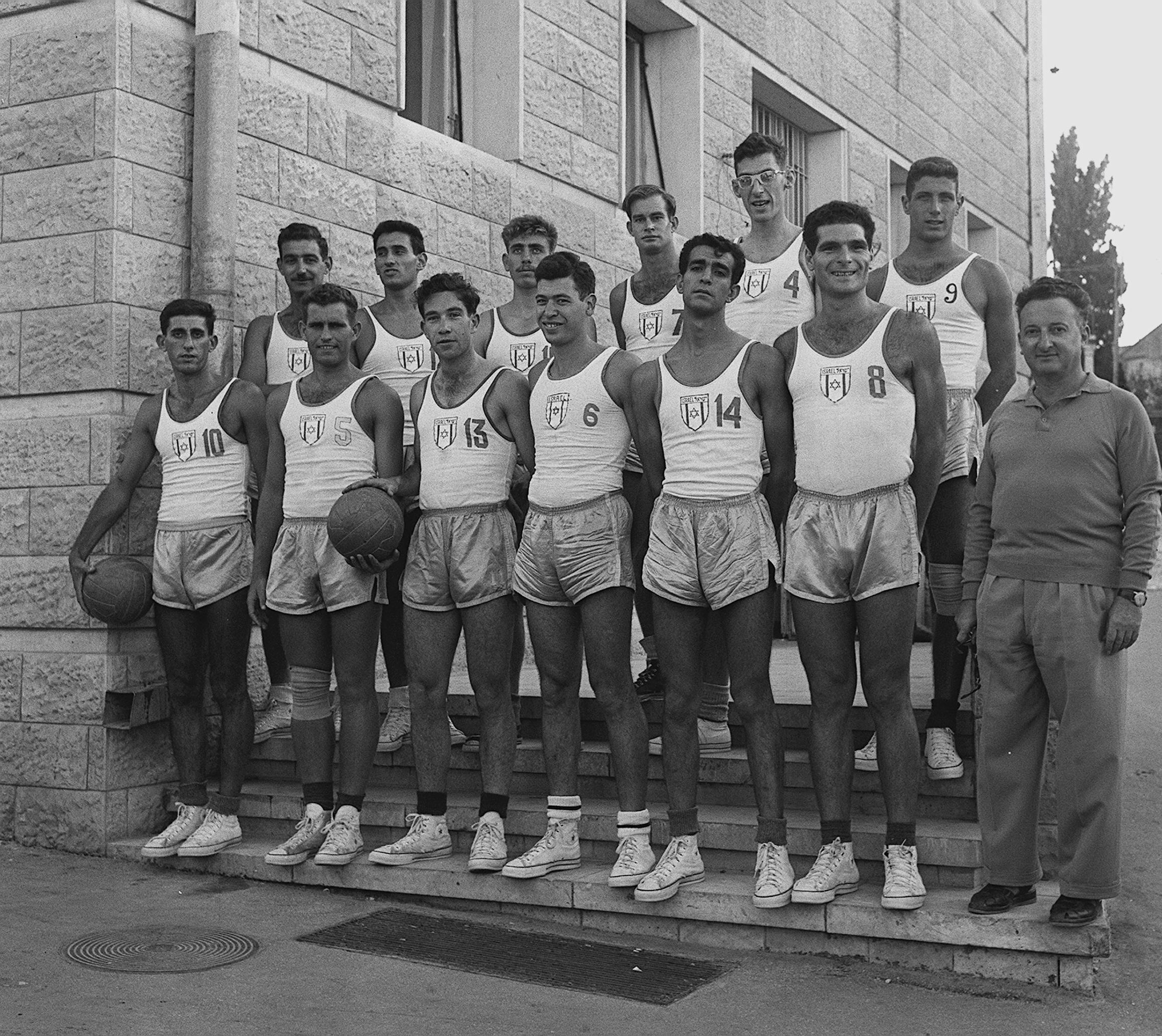
Ralph Klein (first row, left hand side), with the Israeli national basketball team, 1960

Klein was also a member of the senior Israel national basketball team. With Israel's senior national team, he played at the 1952 Summer Olympic Games, and at the 1954 edition of the FIBA World Cup. He also played at the 1953, 1959, 1961, and 1963 editions of the FIBA EuroBasket. He also played at the 1960 Pre-Olympic Tournament. In total, Klein played in 68 games with the senior Israeli national team.

== Basketball coaching career ==
=== Clubs ===
Klein began his coaching career in 1964. In 1969, he was appointed as head coach of Maccabi Tel Aviv, with which he won 10 Israeli Super League championships, 9 Israeli State Cups, and the FIBA European Champions Cup (EuroLeague) championship of the 1976–77 season. He also coached the German League club Saturn Köln, and he won another Israeli State Cup title with Hapoel Tel Aviv.

=== National teams ===
As head coach of the senior Israeli national team, Klein won a silver medal at the 1979 EuroBasket, and also finished in sixth place in 1981 and 1983. In the latter year, he unexpectedly announced his appointment as the head coach of the senior West German national team at the 1984 Summer Olympics.

Klein led West Germany to an eighth-place finish at the 1984 Summer Olympic Games, and to a fifth-place finish at the 1985 EuroBasket (which was held in West Germany).

== Personal life ==
In 2007, Klein was diagnosed as suffering from colorectal cancer, and he was believed to be on his deathbed. However, his health improved and he even went back to coaching.

He died of cancer on August 7, 2008, at Sheba Medical Center, in Tel HaShomer.

== Awards ==
In 1978, he was awarded the Herzl Prize for sports. In 2006, Klein was awarded the Israel Prize for sport, along with former football goalkeeper Ya'akov Hodorov.

== Commemoration ==
- In 2010, the filming of "Playoff" began, a movie based on Klein's life story, and directed by Israeli movie director, Eran Riklis.
- Israeli basketball team, Elitzur Elkana, whom Klein coached towards the end of his life, is named after the veteran Israeli coach (Elizur "Ralph Klein" Elkanah). The basketball team also wrote a Sefer Torah, in the name and honor of Klein.
- The veterans group of Maccabi Tel Aviv basketball team commemorates the achievements and memory of Ralph Klein, and since his death, it is named "Maccabi Ralph Klein Tel Aviv".

== See also ==
- List of Israel Prize recipients
- List of EuroLeague-winning head coaches
