= Hansi Gnad =

German basketball player and coach

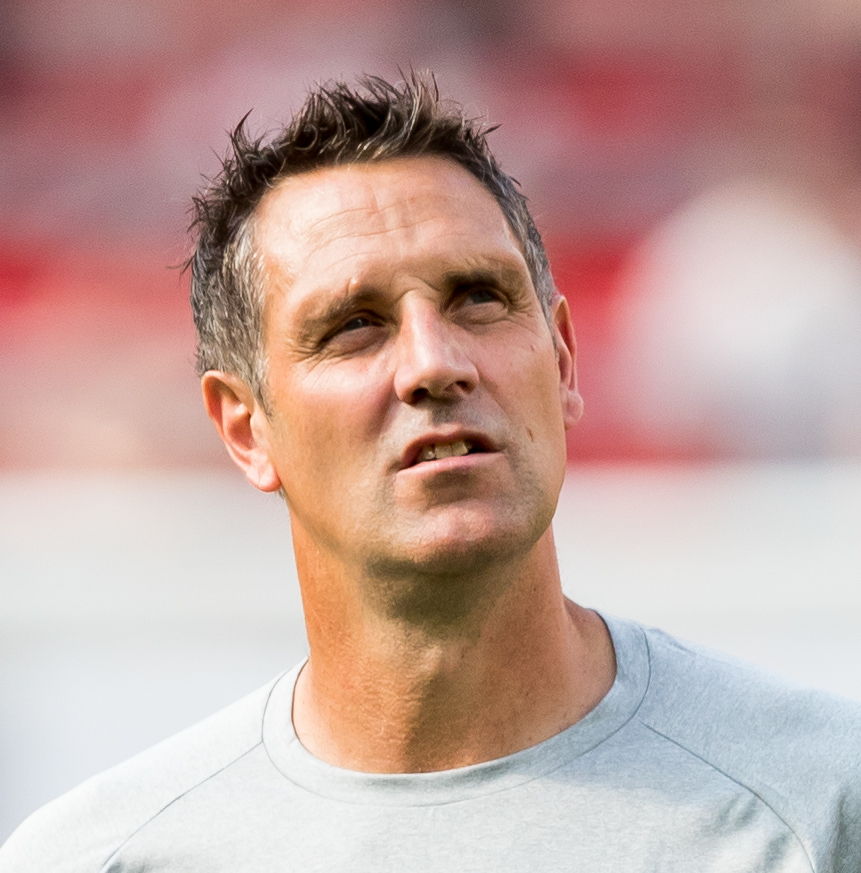
- Gnad in 2019

Bayer Giants Leverkusen
- Title: Assistant coach
- League: ProA

Personal information
- Born: June 4, 1963 (age 63) Darmstadt, West Germany
- Listed height: 6 ft 10 in (2.08 m)
- Listed weight: 220 lb (100 kg)

Career information
- College: Alaska Anchorage (1983–1987)
- NBA draft: 1987: 3rd round, 57th overall pick
- Drafted by: Philadelphia 76ers
- Playing career: 1987–2003
- Position: Power forward / center
- Number: 33, 50
- Coaching career: 2003–present

Career history

Playing
- 1987–1989: Saturn Köln
- 1989–1990: Bayreuth
- 1990–1993: Billy Desio
- 1993–1994: Alba Berlin
- 1994–1995: Brandt Hagen
- 1995–1997: Bayer Leverkusen
- 1997–1999: Scaligera Verona
- 1999: Real Madrid
- 1999–2001: Bayer Leverkusen
- 2001–2003: Brandt Hagen

Coaching
- 2003–2008: Bayer Giants Leverkusen (assistant)
- 2008: Germany (assistant)
- 2009–2010: Giants Düsseldorf
- 2011: Germany (assistant)
- 2015–2018: Bayer Giants Leverkusen (assistant)
- 2018–2024: Bayer Giants Leverkusen
- 2024–present: Bayer Giants Leverkusen (assistant)

Career highlights
- As player: FIBA Korać Cup champion (1998); 2× German League champion (1988, 1996); German Player of the Year (1989); Consensus first-team Division II All-American (1987); No. 33 retired by Alaska Anchorage Seawolves
- Stats at Basketball Reference
Medals
Men's basketball
Representing Germany
EuroBasket
Gold medal – first place	1993 Germany	National team

Hans-Jürgen "Hansi" Gnad (born 4 June 1963) is a retired German professional basketball player and coach. He is currently working as an assistant coach of the Bayer Giants Leverkusen of the ProA. .He represented the senior German national basketball team, and played in the German League team Bayer Giants Leverkusen (1995–1997, 1999–2001).

== College career ==
Gnad played college basketball at the University of Alaska Anchorage. In 2001, Gnad was named to the inaugural Alaska Anchorage sports hall of fame.

== Professional career ==
Gnad was he drafted in the 3rd round of the 1987 NBA draft, by the Philadelphia 76ers. Instead of signing with Philadelphia, Gnad returned to Germany, and began playing professional with BSC Saturn Köln. His player rights were selected in the 1988 NBA expansion draft, by the Miami Heat, with whom he also did not play.

== National team career ==
Gnad was one of the leaders of the senior German national basketball team for 10 years, including captaining it at the 1992 Summer Olympics. He also helped lead the German squad to win the gold medal at the 1993 EuroBasket.

== Personal life ==
Gnad is married to handball player Silke Gnad.

== Head coaching record ==
Team	Year	G	W	L	W–L%	Result
Bayer Giants Leverkusen	2018-19	31	29	2	.9355	Won German ProB championship
Bayer Giants Leverkusen	2019-20	27	14	13	.5185	
Bayer Giants Leverkusen	2020-21	35	23	12	.6571	
Bayer Giants Leverkusen	2021-22	32	19	13	.5938	
Career		125	85	40	.6800	
