= Chris Welp =

German basketball player (1964–2015)

Christian Welp
Personal information
- Born: 2 January 1964 Delmenhorst, West Germany
- Died: 1 March 2015 (aged 51) Hood Canal, Washington, U.S.
- Listed height: 7 ft 0 in (2.13 m)
- Listed weight: 245 lb (111 kg)

Career information
- High school: Olympic (Silverdale, Washington)
- College: Washington (1983–1987)
- NBA draft: 1987: 1st round, 16th overall pick
- Drafted by: Philadelphia 76ers
- Playing career: 1987–1999
- Position: Center
- Number: 44, 42, 40

Career history
- 1987–1989: Philadelphia 76ers
- 1989–1990: San Antonio Spurs
- 1990: Golden State Warriors
- 1990–1996: TSV Bayer 04 Leverkusen
- 1996–1997: Olympiacos
- 1997–1998: Alba Berlin
- 1999: Viola Reggio Calabria

Career highlights
- EuroLeague champion (1997); Greek League champion (1997); Greek Cup winner (1997); 7× German League champion (1991–1996, 1998); 3× German Cup winner (1991, 1993, 1995); Pac-10 Player of the Year (1986); 3× First-team All-Pac-10 (1985–1987); Pac-10 Freshman of the Year (1984); EuroBasket MVP (1993); No. 40 retired by Washington Huskies
- Stats at NBA.com
- Stats at Basketball Reference

Christian Ansgar Welp (2 January 1964 – 1 March 2015) was a German professional basketball player. During his playing career, he was a 213 cm (7 ft 0 in), 111 kg (245 lb) center. He played three seasons in the National Basketball Association (NBA). He was the MVP of the 1993 EuroBasket.

== College career ==
Welp became the leading scorer in Washington Huskies history, as a college basketball player. He scored 2,073 points for the Huskies, and was a three-time All-Pac-10 Conference selection. Welp was the Pac-10 Player of the Year in 1986, and helped lead the Huskies to consecutive conference regular-season titles. On February 22, 1986, Welp had 35 points and 10 rebounds against state rival Washington State. Welp was inducted into the Husky Hall of Fame, in 2001.

== Professional career ==
=== NBA ===
Welp was selected 16th overall, in the National Basketball Association (NBA)'s 1987 draft, by the Philadelphia 76ers, and he played three seasons in the NBA. In December 1987, he slipped on a wet court in Chicago, the night after a Blackhawks hockey game. Welp remembered, "There was condensation on the floor, and the ball boys were mopping the floor the whole game," and the injury "was so severe, my knee never got back to the level it was before. But no excuses."

He was traded by the 76ers, along with Maurice Cheeks and David Wingate, to the San Antonio Spurs, in exchange for Johnny Dawkins and Jay Vincent, during the off-season of 1989.

He was used sparingly by the Spurs, before being traded to the Golden State Warriors, in exchange for Uwe Blab (another German-born NBA center), at the trade deadline, during the 1989–90 NBA season. After a handful of games with the Warriors, his NBA career ended.

=== Europe ===
From 1990 to 1996, Welp played in Germany, with Bayer Leverkusen, with which he won six German national league championships and three German Cups. For the 1996–97 season, Welp played with the Greek League club Olympiacos, winning the EuroLeague title with them (and also the Triple Crown). In the 1997–98 season, he played with the German league club Alba Berlin.

He also played with the Italian league club Viola Reggio Calabria, during the 1998–99 season.

== National team career ==
Welp won the gold medal at the EuroBasket 1993, as a player for the senior Germany national team. He scored the decisive last points in the tournament's final. He was voted MVP of that tournament.

== Coaching career ==
Welp worked as an assistant basketball coach for the senior Germany national team until 2006.

== Personal life and death ==
After Welp retired from playing professional basketball in 1999, he lived in Seattle, Washington, with his wife, Melanie, and three children. He worked at a construction-supply business in Woodinville, for Tim Burnham, a former football player, with whom he had become friends during college.

Welp died on 1 March 2015, of heart failure. He was at a vacation home on Hood Canal, that he had purchased just after being drafted in 1987. He had been complaining of chest pains, and was planning to see a doctor. Welp's sons Collin and Nic both practiced basketball with their father; Collin later played for the UC Irvine Anteaters men's basketball team.

== Career statistics ==
Legend
GP	Games played	GS	Games started	MPG	Minutes per game
FG%	Field goal percentage	3P%	3-point field goal percentage	FT%	Free throw percentage
RPG	Rebounds per game	APG	Assists per game	SPG	Steals per game
BPG	Blocks per game	PPG	Points per game	**Bold**	Career high

=== NBA ===
==== Regular season ====
Year	Team	GP	GS	MPG	FG%	3P%	FT%	RPG	APG	SPG	BPG	PPG
1987–88	Philadelphia	10	0	**13.2**	**.581**	–	.667	2.4	**.5**	**.5**	.5	**4.8**
1988–89	Philadelphia	**72**	0	11.7	.446	.000	.658	**2.7**	.4	.3	**.6**	3.4
1989–90	San Antonio	13	1	4.3	.304	–	.500	.9	.4	.1	.0	1.2
1989–90	Golden State	14	**2**	10.1	.421	–	**.783**	2.6	.3	.4	**.6**	3.6
Career		109	3	10.8	.446	.000	.681	2.4	.4	.3	.5	3.3

==== Playoffs ====
Year	Team	GP	GS	MPG	FG%	3P%	FT%	RPG	APG	SPG	BPG	PPG
1989	Philadelphia	3	0	7.3	.333	–	.000	2.3	.0	.0	.0	.7
