= Stephen Arigbabu =

German basketball player and coach

Yankey Ark
- League: P. League+

Personal information
- Born: 15 February 1972 (age 54) Hannover, West Germany
- Listed height: 6 ft 10 in (2.08 m)
- Listed weight: 265 lb (120 kg)

Career information
- Playing career: 1992–2010
- Position: Power forward / center
- Coaching career: 2010–present

Career history

Playing
- 1992–1994: Braunschweig
- 1994–1996: SSV Ulm 1846
- 1996–1998: ALBA Berlin
- 1998–1999: Papagou
- 1999–2000: Panionios
- 2000–2001: Dafni
- 2001–2003: Köln 99ers
- 2003–2004: Mitteldeutscher
- 2004–2005: Roseto Basket
- 2005–2006: ALBA Berlin
- 2006: Basket Livorno
- 2006–2009: Olympia Larissa
- 2009–2010: Maroussi

Coaching
- 2014–2015: SC Rasta Vechta
- 2017–2019: Baskets Würzburg (assistant)
- 2026–present: Yankey Ark (assistant)

Stephen Olumide Arigbabu (born 15 February 1972) is a German professional basketball coach and former player. He is 2.08 m (6 ft 10 in) tall. Arigbabu played at the center position.

== Professional career ==
During his professional career, Arigbabu played in top-class teams such as ALBA Berlin, Panionios, and Maroussi. He won the EuroCup Challenge with Mitteldeutscher in 2004. He also won 2 German League championships, and a German Cup with ALBA Berlin.

== National team career ==
Arigbabu was also a player of the senior men's German national basketball team, and he won a bronze medal with them at the 2002 FIBA World Championship, and a silver medal at the EuroBasket 2005.
