= Marko Pešić =

German basketball player and executive

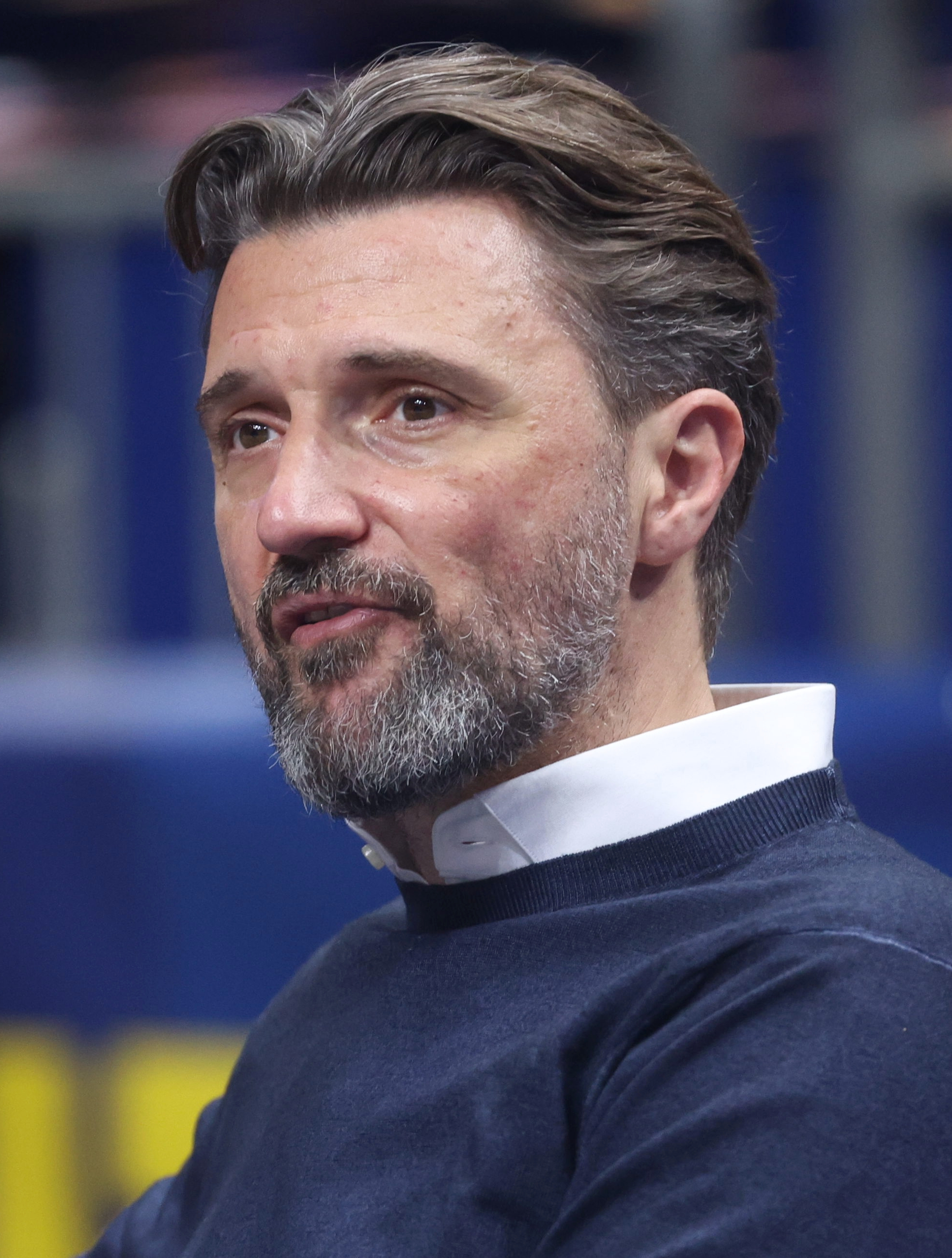
- Pešić in 2025

FC Bayern Munich
- Title: General manager
- League: Basketball Bundesliga; Euroleague

Personal information
- Born: 6 December 1976 (age 49) Sarajevo, SFR Yugoslavia
- Listed height: 1.98 m (6 ft 6 in)
- Listed weight: 80 kg (176 lb)

Career information
- NBA draft: 1998: undrafted
- Playing career: 1995–2006
- Position: Shooting guard
- Number: 7, 10, 20

Career history
- 1995–1999: Alba Berlin
- 1999–2000: Iraklis Thessaloniki
- 2000–2004: Alba Berlin
- 2004–2005: RheinEnergie Köln
- 2005–2006: Lottomatica Roma
- 2006: Teramo Basket

Career highlights
- 6× German League champion (1997, 1998, 1999, 2001, 2002, 2003); 5× German Cup winner (1997, 1999, 2002, 2003, 2005)
Medals
Men's basketball
Representing Germany
FIBA World Cup
Bronze medal – third place	2002 USA	Team
EuroBasket
Silver medal – second place	2005 Serbia & Montenegro	Team

Marko Pešić (Serbian Cyrillic: Марко Пешић, born 6 December 1976) is a German and Serbian professional basketball executive and former player, currently serving as the general manager in the Bayern Munich of the Basketball Bundesliga. He represented Germany internationally. His father is a Serbian basketball coach and former player Svetislav Pešić.

== Early life ==
Pešić was born in Sarajevo, SR Bosnia and Herzegovina, SFR Yugoslavia. His father Svetislav played for the Sarajevo-based team Bosna of the Yugoslav Basketball League during that time. He moved to Germany in 1987 when his father became a head coach of the Germany national basketball team.

== Playing career ==
Pešić spent most of his professional basketball career with the Alba Berlin of the German League. He also stints with RheinEnergie Köln, as well as the Iraklis Thessaloniki of the Greek Basket League, and the Lottomatica Roma and the Teramo Basket in Italy.

His father was his coach while he played for the Alba Berlin (1995–99) and the Lottomatica Roma (2005–06).

== National team career ==
As a player for the Germany national team Pešić won a silver medal at the EuroBasket 2005 in Serbia and Montenegro and a bronze medal at the 2002 FIBA World Championship in the United States.

== Post-playing career ==
Following his active career, Pešić studied sports marketing and communication at the University of Venice. In 2007, he became self-employed as a consultant at the company Lumani 10.7 GmbH. In 2008, he successfully completed his studies as a sports manager at IST Düsseldorf, which he had begun during his career as a player.

For the 2011–12 season, Pešić became the new sports director of the basketball division of the FC Bayern Munich. On 11 January 2013, he took over the position of general manager at the Bayern Munich.

On 29 March 2018, Bayern Munich sacked head coach Aleksandar Đorđević after the elimination in the semifinal of EuroCup. During Đorđević coaching tenure, Bayern Munich held first position in the 2017–18 Basketball Bundesliga with 23–2 score before got sacked. Few days after the dismissal, Đorđević qualified it as an "insult for common sense", especially since the 2017–18 season was one of the most successful in team's history. Đorđević also added that there was apparently a disagreement between team's management (in particular Pešić) and his coaching staff, as Đorđević didn't allow bigger involvement of team's management in coaching decisions.

== Personal life ==
German former basketball player Jan Jagla is his brother in law.

== Career achievements and awards ==
As player

- German League champion: 6 (with Alba Berlin: 1996–97, 1997–98, 1998–99, 2000–01, 2001–02, 2002–03)
- German Cup winner: 5 (with Alba Berlin: 1996–97, 1998–99, 2001–02, 2002–03; with RheinEnergie Köln: 2004–05)

As general manager

- German League champion: 1 (with FC Bayern Munich: 2013–14)
