= Stefano Garris =

German basketball player (born 1979)

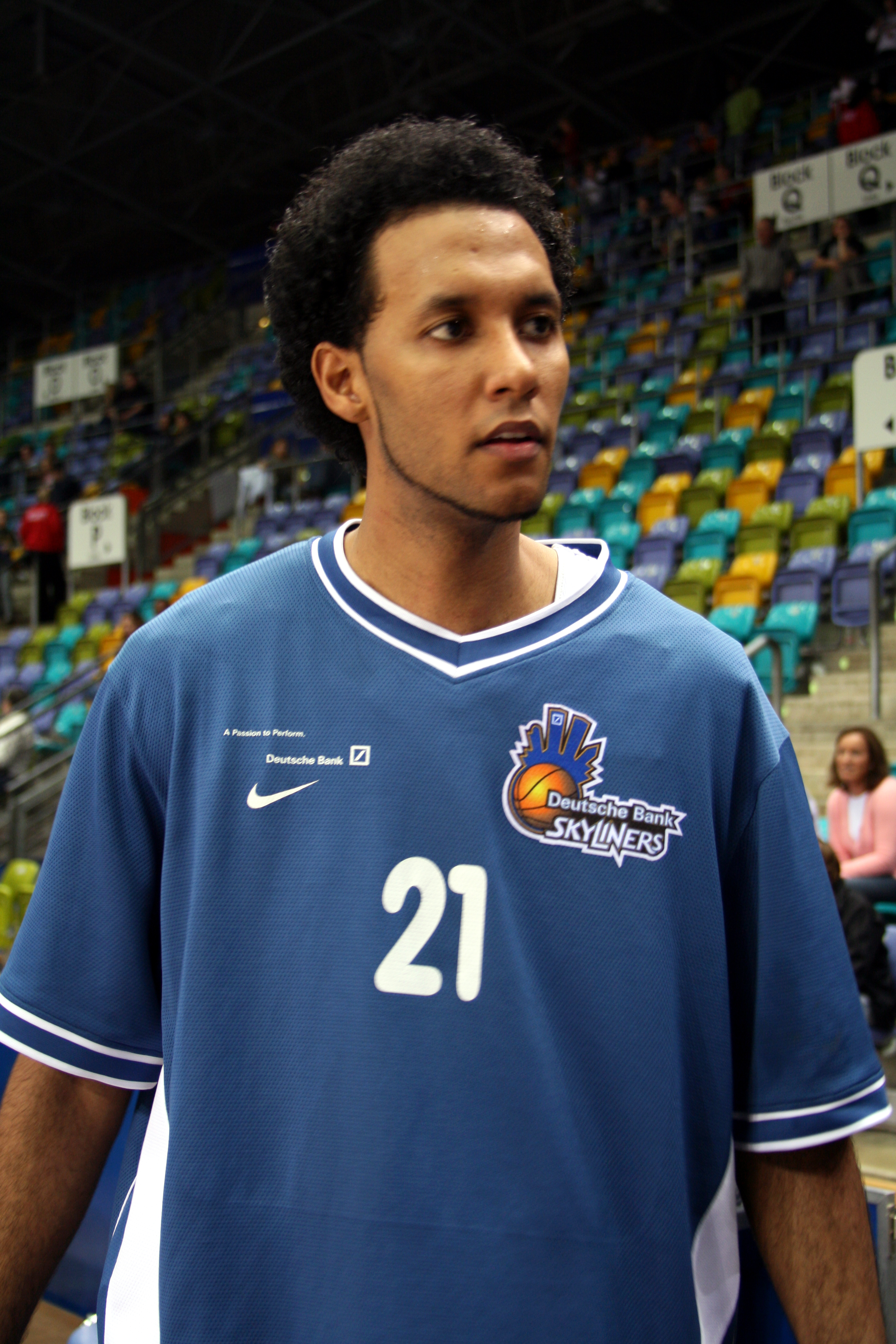
- Garris in 2006

Personal information
- Born: 21 April 1979 (age 47) Paderborn, West Germany

Career information
- Playing career: 1994–2012

Career history
- 1994–1998: Paderborn Baskets
- 1999–2001: TuS Lichterfelde Berlin
- 2001–2005: ALBA Berlin
- 2005–2008: Skyliners Frankfurt
- 2008–2009: Paderborn Baskets

Stefano "Nino" Garris (born 21 April 1979) is a German former professional basketball player.

He was born in West Germany to an Italian mother and an African American father.

Garris was capped for the German national team 72 times. His greatest success was third place at the 2002 Basketball World Cup in Indianapolis, United States.

His retirement was announced in 2012 due to injuries.
