= Armin Sowa =

German basketball player (born 1959)

Personal information
- Nationality: German
- Born: 2 August 1959 (age 67) Waake, West Germany

Sport
- Sport: Basketball

Armin Sowa (born 2 August 1959) is a West German former basketball player. He competed in the men's tournament at the 1984 Summer Olympics.
