= Klaus Weinand =

German basketball player (born 1940)

Personal information
- Born: 14 December 1940 (age 84); Koblenz, Germany

Career history
- 1960–1962: USC Heidelberg

Klaus Weinand (born 14 December 1940) is a former German basketball player. He competed in the men's tournament at the 1972 Summer Olympics.
