= Jens Kujawa =

German basketball player (born 1965)

Jens Ingo Holger Franz Kujawa (born January 28, 1965) is a former professional basketball player born in Braunschweig, Lower Saxony, West Germany. In 1984, he was a foreign exchange student and a prep basketball player at Taylorville High School in Taylorville, Illinois. He went on to play basketball for the University of Illinois Fighting Illini team from 1984 to 1988, where he earned three letters. Kujawa left for his native Germany before his senior season after averaging 5.3 points and 5.2 rebounds per game in his junior season for the Illini.

He represented Germany in the 1992 Summer Olympics held in Barcelona, Spain. The German team finished seventh overall, with a record of three wins and five losses. He was a member of the German national team that won the only European title for the country in 1993.

Professionally, Kujawa played for German teams in Leverkusen, Ludwigsburg, Ulm and Oberelchingen from 1988 to 2001.

He lives in Winsen (Luhe), Germany and works as a consultant in the field of lifetime working accounts.

He is a member of the board for the German association for lifetime working accounts AG ZWK and a charity organisation BASKETBALL AID.
