= Jürgen Wohlers =

German basketball player (born 1945)

Personal information
- Nationality: German
- Born: 27 June 1945 (age 79); Wolfenbüttel, Germany

Sport
- Sport: Basketball

Jürgen Wohlers (born 27 June 1945) is a former German basketball player. He competed in the men's tournament at the 1972 Summer Olympics.
