= Rainer Pethran =

West German basketball player (1950–2019)

Personal information
- Nationality: German
- Born: 26 November 1950; Augsburg, West Germany
- Died: 2 September 2019 (aged 68)

Sport
- Sport: Basketball

Rainer Pethran (26 November 1950 – 2 September 2019) was a West German basketball player. He competed in the men's tournament at the 1972 Summer Olympics.
