= Christoph Körner =

German basketball player (born 1962)

Personal information
- Nationality: German
- Born: 1 December 1962 (age 63) Buer, West Germany

Sport
- Sport: Basketball

Christoph Körner (born 1 December 1962) is a former West German basketball player. He competed in the men's tournament at the 1984 Summer Olympics.
