= Armin Andres =

German basketball player (born 1959)

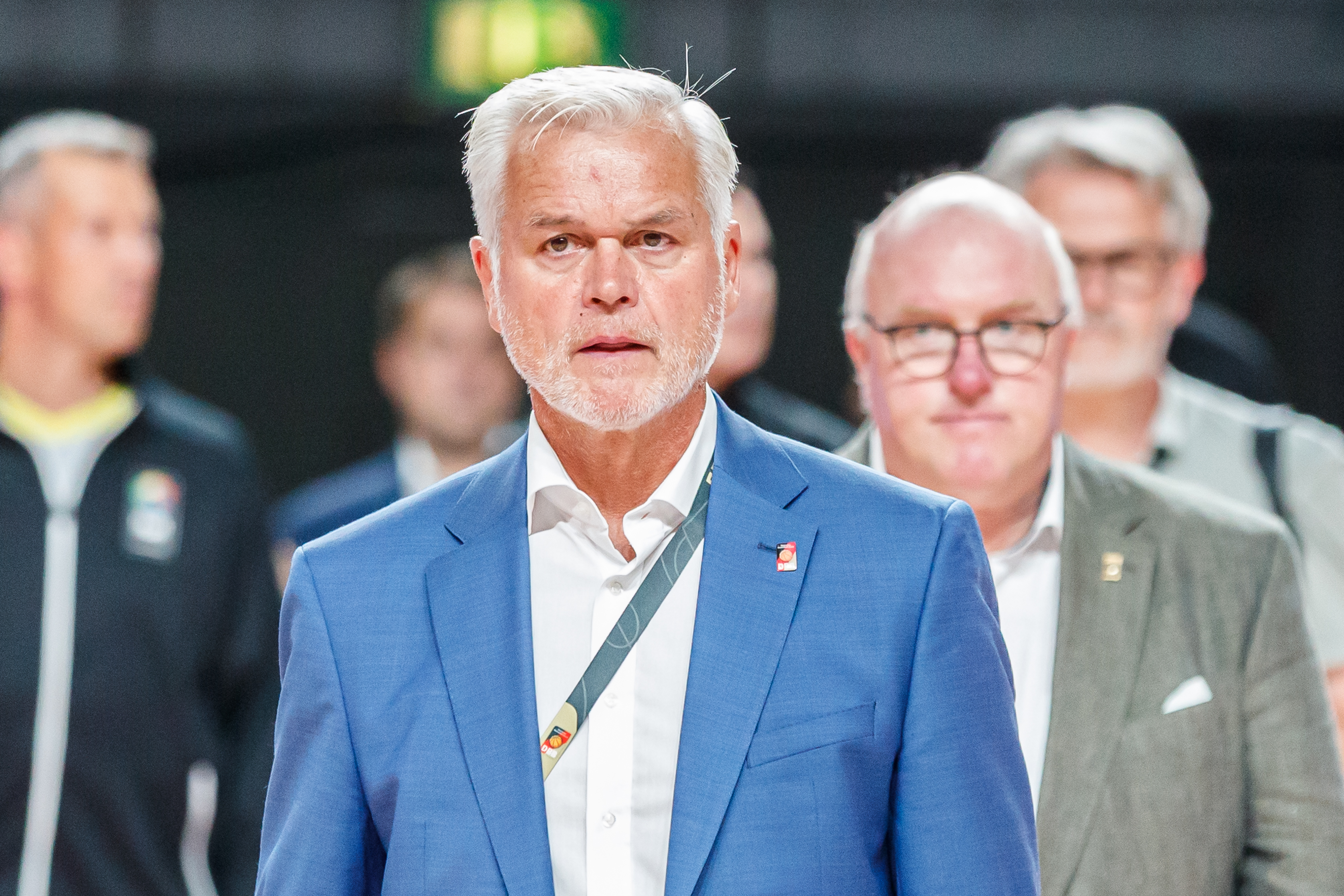
- 2022 as a vice president of DBB

Personal information
- Nationality: German
- Born: 5 April 1959 (age 66); Bamberg, West Germany

Sport
- Sport: Basketball

Armin Andres (born 5 April 1959) is a former German former basketball player. He competed in the men's tournament at the 1992 Summer Olympics.
