= Stephan Baeck =

German basketball player and coach

Personal information
- Born: 12 April 1965 (age 61) Cologne, West Germany
- Listed height: 1.94 m (6 ft 4 in)

Career history
  - 1985: Bayer Leverkusen
- 1985–1990: Saturn
- 1990–1992: Bayer Giants Leverkusen
- 1992–1996: Alba
- 1996–1997: PAOK
- 1997–1998: Ruhr Devils
- 1998–1999: Hagen
- 1999–2000: Alba Berlin
- 2000–2001: Köln

Stephan Baeck (born 12 April 1965) is a German former basketball player. He competed in the men's tournament at the 1992 Summer Olympics. He won the gold medal at the EuroBasket 1993.
