= Jochen Pollex =

German basketball player (born 1947)

Personal information
- Nationality: German
- Born: 6 June 1947 (age 77); Wismar, Germany

Sport
- Sport: Basketball

Jochen Pollex (born 6 June 1947) is a German former basketball player. He competed in the men's tournament at the 1972 Summer Olympics.
