= Gunther Behnke =

German basketball player (born 1963)

Personal information
- Born: January 19, 1963 (age 63) Leverkusen, West Germany
- Listed height: 7 ft 3 in (221 cm)
- Stats at Basketball Reference

Gunther Behnke (born January 19, 1963) is a German former professional basketball player. The 7 ft 3 in (2.21 metres) center was on the team that won the 1993 FIBA European Championship.

Behnke began playing basketball as a teenager in Pulheim near Cologne. He was recruited by head coach Joe B. Hall to play for the University of Kentucky but became homesick and never appeared in a game for Kentucky. Behnke was drafted by the Cleveland Cavaliers in the 1985 NBA draft. He was selected as the last pick of the Minnesota Timberwolves in the 1989 NBA expansion draft. He never played in the NBA.

Behnke played for TSV Bayer 04 Leverkusen from 1980 through 1992. In those eleven years the team won five German championships (1985, 1986, 1990, 1991 and 1992) and four National Cup championships (1986, 1987, 1990 and 1991). From 1992 through 1994 Behnke played for TuS Bramsche. From 1994 through 1996 he played for ALBA Berlin, which won the Korac Cup in 1995, becoming the first German team to win a European club championship. From 1996 through 2000 Behnke played for Telekom Baskets Bonn, with which he twice reached the final of the German championship, losing to his prior team, ALBA Berlin.

Between 1983 and 1995, Behnke made 146 appearances for the German national team, scoring 702 points. He participated in two World Championships and four European Championships and in 1992 competed in the Olympic Games.

In 2000, Behnke retired from basketball.
