= Jörg Lütcke =

German basketball player (born 1975)

Personal information
- Born: 12 December 1975 (age 49); Stuttgart, West Germany
- Listed height: 201 cm (6 ft 7 in)
- Listed weight: 95 kg (209 lb)
- Position: Small forward

Career history
- –1995: TuS-Lichterfelde
- 1995–2003: Alba Berlin
- 2003–2005: RheinEnergy Cologne

Jörg Lütcke (born 12 December 1975) is a German former professional basketball player.

== Biography ==
Jörg Lütcke was born on 12 December 1975 in Stuttgart and grew up in Lichterfelde, Berlin. Like his older brother Niklas, he soon joined TuS Lichterfelde, a partner of the basketball club Alba Berlin. After participating in the junior-worldwide Nike Hoop Summit in 1995, he joined Alba Berlin's League One. As a part of the German national team, he played in the European championships of 1997 and 1999, as well as the world championship in 2002.

In 1999 and 2002, Lütcke suffered from cruciate ruptures, enforcing him to take long breaks. Following another injury in 2005, he resigned from his basketball career and studied medicine, becoming an internist. He lives with his wife and four children in Berlin.

== Accolades ==
- German youth champion in 1989, 1991, 1993, 1994 (TuS Lichterfelde)
- German champion in 1996, 1997, 1998, 1999, 2000, 2001, 2002 (Alba Berlin)
- German Cup winner in 1997, 1999, 2002, 2003 (Alba Berlin)
- German Cup winner in 2004 (RheinEnergy Cologne)
- Bronze medal for World Championship in 2002
