= Uwe Brauer =

German basketball player (born 1962)

Personal information
- Nationality: German
- Born: 11 July 1962 (age 62); Leverkusen, West Germany

Sport
- Sport: Basketball

Uwe Brauer (born 11 July 1962) is a West German former basketball player. He competed in the men's tournament at the 1984 Summer Olympics.
