= Helmut Uhlig =

German basketball player (1942–2014)

Personal information
- Nationality: German
- Born: 11 November 1942; Halle, Germany
- Died: 22 July 2014 (aged 71); Osnabrück, Germany

Sport
- Sport: Basketball

Helmut Uhlig (11 November 1942 – 22 July 2014) was a German basketball player. He competed in the men's tournament at the 1972 Summer Olympics.
