= Ingo Mendel =

German basketball player (born 1960)

Personal information
- Nationality: German
- Born: 24 June 1960 (age 64); Menden, West Germany

Sport
- Sport: Basketball

Ingo Mendel (born 24 June 1960) is a former West German basketball player. He competed in the men's tournament at the 1984 Summer Olympics.
