= Ulrich Peters (basketball) =

German basketball player (born 1957)

Personal information
- Nationality: German
- Born: 2 July 1957 (age 69) Augsburg, West Germany

Sport
- Sport: Basketball

Ulrich Peters (born 2 July 1957) is a former West German basketball player. He competed in the men's tournament at the 1984 Summer Olympics.
