= Michael Pappert =

German basketball player (born 1957)

Personal information
- Full name: Michael Johannes Pappert
- Nationality: German
- Born: 15 August 1957 (age 67); Hamburg, West Germany

Sport
- Sport: Basketball

Michael Pappert (born 15 August 1957) is a former West German basketball player. He competed in the men's tournament at the 1984 Summer Olympics.
