= Kai Nürnberger =

German basketball player (born 1966)

Personal information
- Born: 7 June 1966 (age 60) Wolfenbüttel, West Germany
- Listed height: 6 ft 0 in (1.83 m)
- Listed weight: 187 lb (85 kg)

Career information
- College: Southern Illinois (1984–1989)
- NBA draft: 1989: undrafted
- Playing career: 1989–2004
- Position: Point guard

Career highlights
- German Player of the Year (1993); First-team All-MVC (1989); Second-team All-MVC (1988)

Kai Joachim Nürnberger (born 7 June 1966) is a German former basketball player. He competed in the men's tournament at the 1992 Summer Olympics.
