= Klaus Zander =

German basketball player (born 1956)

Personal information
- Nationality: German
- Born: 6 September 1956 (age 69) Cologne, West Germany

Sport
- Sport: Basketball

Klaus Zander (born 6 September 1956) is a former West German basketball player. He competed in the men's tournament at the 1984 Summer Olympics.
