= Anton Gavel =

Slovak-German basketball player (born 1984)

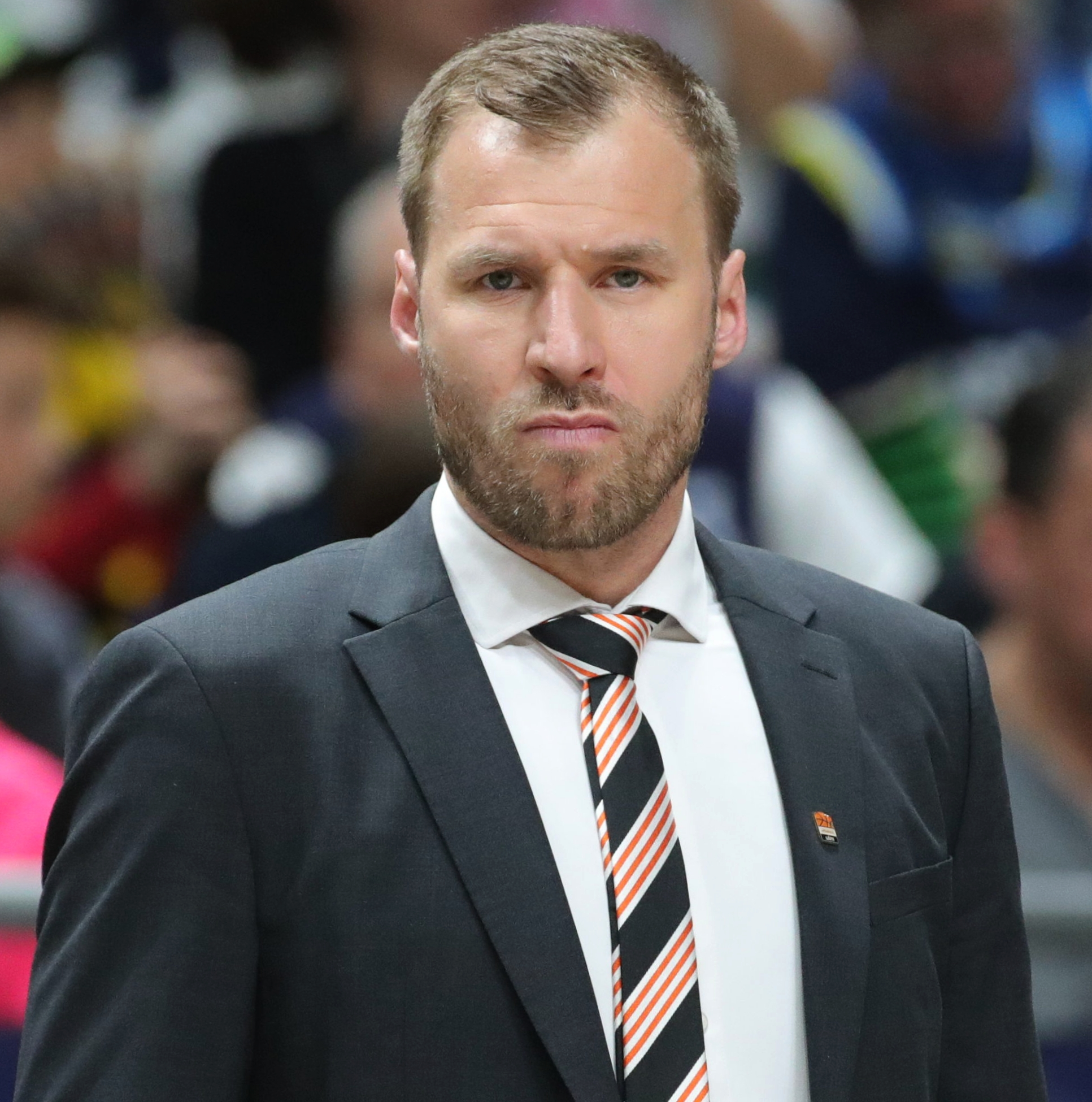
- Gavel in 2023

FC Bayern Munich
- Title: Head coach
- League: BBL; EuroLeague

Personal information
- Born: 24 October 1984 (age 42) Košice, Czechoslovakia
- Listed height: 6 ft 2 in (1.88 m)
- Listed weight: 192 lb (87 kg)

Career information
- NBA draft: 2006: undrafted
- Playing career: 2001–2018
- Position: Shooting guard / point guard
- Coaching career: 2019–present

Career history

Playing
- 2001–2003: Karlsuhe
- 2004–2006: Giessen 46ers
- 2006–2008: Murcia
- 2008–2009: Aris
- 2009: Chemosvit
- 2009–2014: Brose Bamberg
- 2014–2018: Bayern Munich

Coaching
- 2019–2022: OrangeAcademy
- 2022–2024: ratiopharm Ulm
- 2024–2026: Bamberg
- 2026–present: Bayern Munich

Career highlights
- As player: 5× German Bundesliga champion (2010–2013, 2018); 3× German Cup winner (2010–2012); 3× BBL Champions Cup winner (2010–2012); German Bundesliga Finals MVP (2013); 4× German All-Star (2013–2015, 2017); 2× All-German Bundesliga First Team (2013, 2014); All-German Bundesliga Second Team (2012); 2× German Bundesliga Best Defender (2012, 2013); German Bundesliga Newcomer of the Year (2005); German Bundesliga Rookie of the Year (2006); German 2nd Division champion (2003); 4× Slovak Player of the Year (2005, 2010–2012); As head coach: German Bundesliga champion (2023); German Cup winner (2026); German Bundesliga Coach of the Year (2026)

Anton Gavel (born 24 October 1984) is a Slovak-German professional basketball coach and former player who currently serves as the head coach for Bayern Munich of the German Basketball Bundesliga (BBL) and the EuroLeague. He is a 1.89-metre-tall (6 ft 2 in) combo guard who primarily played at the shooting guard position.

He is a four-time Slovak Player of the Year (2005, 2010, 2011, 2012).

== Professional career ==
After playing with the youth clubs of Chemosvit, Gavel began his professional career in the German 2nd Division with Karlsuhe, during the 2001–02 season. He then moved to the German 1st Division club Giessen 46ers in 2004. He was named the German League's Rookie of the Year in 2006.

After that, he joined the Spanish League club Murcia in 2006. He then joined the Greek League club Aris Thessaloniki for the 2008–09 season. He then joined the Slovak League club Chemosvit for the start of the 2009–10 season, before signing with the German 1st Division club Brose Baskets that same season.

He was named the BBL Best Defensive Player in 2012. In 2013, he won the award again, and was as well named the BBL Finals MVP, after he won his fourth straight German League title.

On 22 July 2014, Gavel signed a two-year contract with the German champion Bayern Munich. On 8 July 2016, it was announced that he signed a two-year extension with the team. Gavel announced his retirement on 28 August 2018.

== National team career ==
=== Slovak national team ===
Gavel played at the 2005 World University Games. He was a member of the senior men's Slovak national basketball team. Some of the tournaments that he played in with the Slovak senior men's national team included: the FIBA EuroBasket 2005 Division B, the FIBA EuroBasket 2007 Division B, the FIBA EuroBasket 2009 Division B, and the FIBA EuroBasket 2011 Division B. He also played at the FIBA EuroBasket 2013 qualification tournament.

=== German national team ===
In July 2015, two months before EuroBasket 2015, Gavel expressed his desire to represent the senior German national team. On 13 August 2015, FIBA permitted him to switch to the German national team. Gavel made his debut for Germany on 14 August 2015, against Croatia.

== Coaching career ==
In the 2019–20 season, Gavel would be the head coach of OrangeAcademy of the German third-tier league ProB.

On 25 June 2022, he has signed with ratiopharm Ulm of the Basketball Bundesliga.

On 27 March 2024, he signed a 3-year contract with Bamberg Baskets of the Basketball Bundesliga (BBL).

On June 29, 2026, Gavel signed a three–year contract with Bayern Munich of the Basketball Bundesliga (BBL) and the EuroLeague.

== Career statistics ==
Legend
| GP | Games played | GS | Games started | MPG | Minutes per game |
| FG% | Field-goal percentage | 3P% | 3-point field-goal percentage | FT% | Free-throw percentage |
| RPG | Rebounds per game | APG | Assists per game | SPG | Steals per game |
| BPG | Blocks per game | PPG | Points per game | PIR | Performance index rating |
| **Bold** | Career high |

=== EuroLeague ===
| Year | Team | GP | GS | MPG | FG% | 3P% | FT% | RPG | APG | SPG | BPG | PPG | PIR |
|---|---|---|---|---|---|---|---|---|---|---|---|---|---|
| 2010–11 | Bamberg | 10 | 10 | 30.8 | .434 | .333 | .857 | 2.1 | 1.9 | .6 | .0 | 8.3 | 5.7 |
| 2011–12 | Bamberg | 10 | 10 | 29.6 | .386 | .308 | .731 | 1.7 | 2.1 | **.9** | **.2** | 8.5 | 8.0 |
| 2012–13 | Bamberg | **23** | **22** | **31.5** | .441 | .367 | .794 | 2.1 | 3.0 | .7 | .1 | **12.3** | 11.5 |
| 2013–14 | Bamberg | 10 | 10 | 28.0 | **.446** | **.500** | .806 | **2.5** | **3.4** | .7 | .1 | 11.6 | **12.8** |
| 2014–15 | Bayern Munich | 7 | 5 | 29.0 | .370 | .278 | **.900** | 2.1 | 3.3 | .3 | .0 | 8.1 | 10.0 |
| Career | | 60 | 57 | 30.1 | .431 | .365 | .803 | 2.1 | 2.8 | .7 | .1 | 10.4 | 10.0 |

Sporting positions
| Preceded by Bryce Taylor | Bayern Munich captain 2017–2018 | Succeeded by Danilo Barthel |
