= Akeem Vargas =

German basketball player (born 1990)

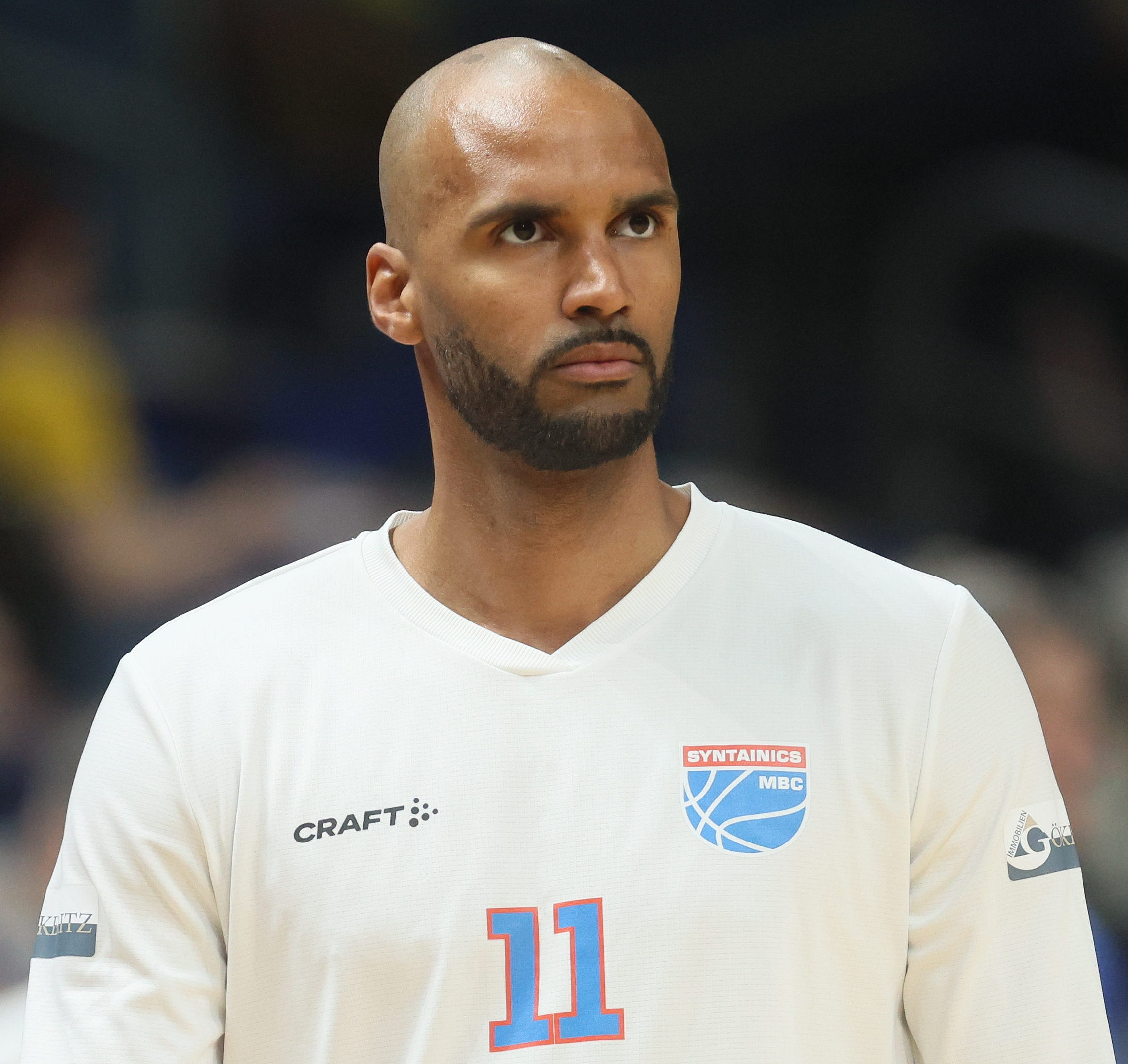
- Vargas with Mitteldeutscher BC in 2025

Free agent
- Position: Shooting guard

Personal information
- Born: April 29, 1990 (age 36) Lancaster, California, U.S.
- Listed height: 6 ft 4 in (1.93 m)
- Listed weight: 198 lb (90 kg)

Career information
- College: Iowa Lakes CC (2009–2010)
- NBA draft: 2012: undrafted
- Playing career: 2006–present

Career history
- 2006–2009: Ehingen Urspring
- 2010–2012: Tigers Tübingen
- 2010–2012: →Ehingen Urspring
- 2012–2013: Göttingen
- 2013–2018: Alba Berlin
- 2018–2020: Skyliners Frankfurt
- 2020–2022: Göttingen
- 2022–2024: Heidelberg
- 2024–2026: Mitteldeutscher BC

Career highlights
- 2× German Cup champion (2014, 2016); 2× German Supercup champion (2013, 2014); ProA Young Player of the Year (2013)

Akeem Vargas (born 29 April 1990) is a German professional basketball player who most recently played for Mitteldeutscher BC of the Basketball Bundesliga (BBL). Previously he has also played for Skyliners Frankfurt and Alba Berlin. Vargas was born in the United States but grew up in Leimen (Baden), Germany. Vargas is a former member of the German national team.

During the 2019-20 season, Vargas averaged 7 points and 2.8 rebounds per game in BBL play with Skyliners Frankfurt. He signed with BG Göttingen on July 23, 2020. On June 23, 2022, Vargas signed with USC Heidelberg of the Basketball Bundesliga. With Heidelberg, he was named team captain alongside Max Ugrai. On June 11, 2024, he signed with Mitteldeutscher BC of the BBL.
