= Leon Radošević =

Croatian basketball player (born 1990)

- Radošević with Andorra in 2026

No. 43 – BC Andorra
- Position: Center
- League: Liga ACB

Personal information
- Born: 26 February 1990 (age 36) Sisak, SR Croatia, Yugoslavia
- Listed height: 6 ft 10 in (2.08 m)
- Listed weight: 249 lb (113 kg)

Career information
- NBA draft: 2012: undrafted
- Playing career: 2009–present

Career history
- 2009–2011: Cibona
- 2011–2013: Olimpia Milano
- 2012–2013: → Lietuvos rytas
- 2013–2015: Alba Berlin
- 2015: Beşiktaş
- 2015–2018: Brose Bamberg
- 2018–2022: Bayern Munich
- 2022–2024: Derthona
- 2024–2025: Dubai Basketball
- 2025: Split
- 2025–2026: Treviso Basket
- 2026–present: BC Andorra

Career highlights
- 3× German League champion (2016, 2017, 2019); 3× German Cup winner (2014, 2017, 2021); 2× German Supercup winner (2013, 2014); Croatian League champion (2010)
Medals
Men's basketball
Representing Croatia
World U-19 Championship
Bronze medal – third place	2009 New Zealand	U-19 Team
European U-18 Championship
Bronze medal – third place	2008 Greece	U-18 Team

Leon Radošević (born 26 February 1990) is a Croatian professional basketball player for BC Andorra of the Liga ACB. He holds German citizenship since 2017.

== Professional career ==
Radošević made his professional career debut with Cibona Zagreb in 2009. On 17 July 2011 he signed a contract with Emporio Armani Milano. On 29 June 2012 it was announced that Olimpia Milano loaned Radošević to Lietuvos rytas. On 15 January 2013 he left Lietuvos rytas and returned to Emporio Armani Milano. On 30 July 2013 Radošević signed a two–year deal with Alba Berlin.

On 16 September 2015 he signed with Turkish club Beşiktaş. On 17 November 2015 he left Beşiktaş and signed with the German club Brose Bamberg until the end of the season. On 10 April 2016 he re-signed with Brose for three more seasons.

On 13 July 2022 he signed with Derthona Basket of the Italian LBA.

In June 2024, the newcomer to the ABA League, Dubai Basketball signed Radošević making him the first ever signed player for this newly-formed club. Over 25 games, he averaged 4.4 points and 3.1 rebounds on 47.2% shooting from the field. Dubai finished the season with loss in the semifinals series to Partizan Belgrade.

On November 29, 2025, he signed with Treviso Basket of the Lega Basket Serie A.

On August 2, 2026, he signed with MoraBanc Andorra of the Liga ACB.

== International career ==
Radošević represented his national team in U-16, U-18 and U-20 competitions, winning a bronze medal at the 2008 European U-18 Championship.

== Career statistics ==
Legend
GP	Games played	GS	Games started	MPG	Minutes per game
FG%	Field-goal percentage	3P%	3-point field-goal percentage	FT%	Free-throw percentage
RPG	Rebounds per game	APG	Assists per game	SPG	Steals per game
BPG	Blocks per game	PPG	Points per game	PIR	Performance index rating
**Bold**	Career high

=== EuroLeague ===
Year	Team	GP	GS	MPG	FG%	3P%	FT%	RPG	APG	SPG	BPG	PPG	PIR
2009–10	Cibona	16	8	15.2	**.581**	.000	.526	3.0	.4	.6	.2	3.8	3.8
2010–11	Cibona	9	9	**32.7**	.505	.000	.815	**6.3**	**1.3**	**1.2**	.4	**12.9**	**15.8**
2011–12	Milano	14	2	9.2	.515	.000	**.833**	1.3	.3	.2	.3	3.5	3.2
2012–13	Lietuvos rytas	10	2	21.3	.535	.000	.710	3.8	1.1	1.0	**.7**	9.8	10.8
2014–15	Alba Berlin	22	**21**	20.9	.488	.000	.717	3.6	.8	.6	.4	9.0	6.8
2015–16	Brose Bamberg	19	12	18.3	.552	.000	.712	3.5	.6	.3	.4	7.5	8.4
2016–17	Brose Bamberg	**28**	**21**	16.1	.558	.000	.634	2.6	.6	.4	.3	6.1	5.9
Career		71	42	19.8	.512	.000	.723	3.4	.7	.7	.4	7.3	7.1
