= 2015 BBL Champions Cup =

EWE Baskets Oldenburg	Brose Baskets
66	87
- Date: 27 September 2015
- Venue: Brose Arena, Bamberg
- Attendance: 6,421

The 2015 BBL Champions Cup was a basketball game that was held on 27 September 2015. 2014–15 Basketball Bundesliga champions Brose Baskets faced off against 2015 BBL-Pokal winners EWE Baskets Oldenburg in the Brose Arena in Bamberg.

== Match ==
27 September 2015
20:30

Boxscore

Brose Baskets	87–66	EWE Baskets Oldenburg
Scoring by quarter: 23–17, 23–12, 25–24, 16–13
Pts: Nicolò Melli 17; Rebs: Nicolò Melli 9 Asts: Brad Wanamaker 7		Pts: Brian Qvale 20; Rebs: three players 4 Asts: Chris Kramer 4

Brose Arena, Bamberg
Attendance: 6,421

Brose	Oldenburg

Game rules
Game was played under FIBA rules.

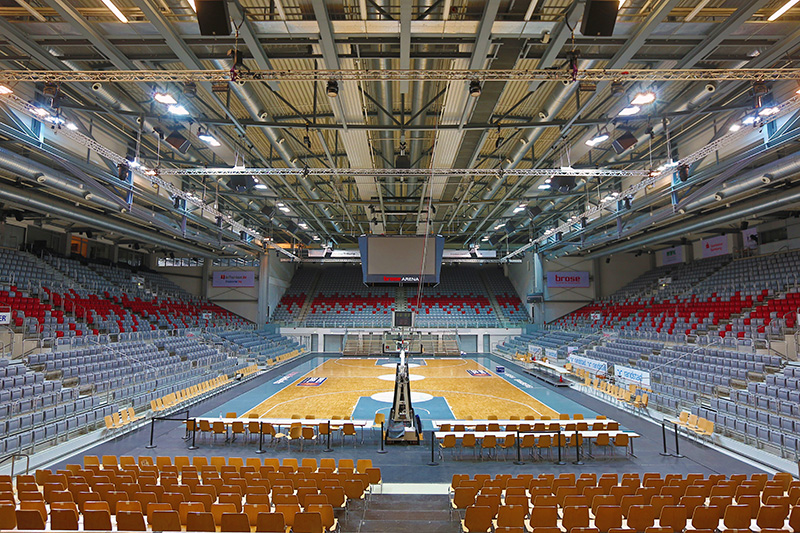
Brose Arena

2015 Champions Cup Winners
Brose Baskets (5th title)
