= 2012 BBL Champions Cup =

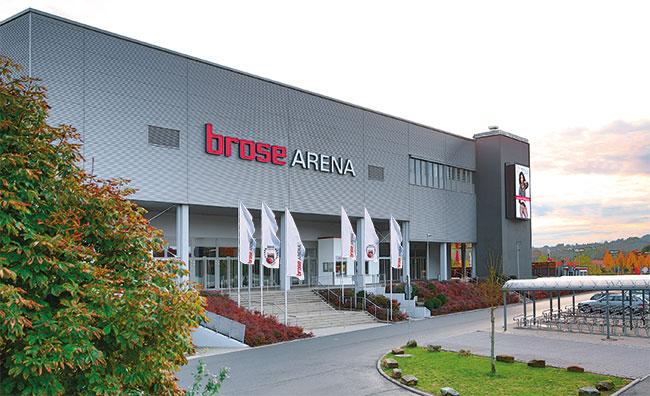
- The game was played in the Brose Arena
ratiopharm Ulm	Brose Baskets
98	102
- After overtime
- Date: September 30, 2012
- Venue: Brose Arena, Bamberg
- Attendance: 6,400

The 2012 BBL Champions Cup was the seventh edition of the super cup game in German basketball, and was played on September 30, 2012. The game was played in the Brose Arena in Bamberg. Defending BBL champions Brose Baskets took on ratiopharm Ulm, that qualified as the runner-up in the BBL-Pokal last season.

== Match ==
September 30, 2012
17:15

Boxscore

Brose Baskets	102–98 (OT)	ratiopharm Ulm
Scoring by quarter: 20–12, 23–25, 20–25, 22–23
Pts: Nachbar 26; Rebs: Ford 9 Asts: Gipson 4		Pts: Bryant 27; Rebs: Bryant 10; Asts: Jeter 5

Brose Arena, Bamberg
Attendance: 6,400

Brose	Ulm

2012 Champions Cup Winners Brose Baskets (4th title)
