= Basketball Bundesliga Best German Young Player =

German basketball award

The Basketball Bundesliga Best German Young Player (German: Bester Deutscher Nachwuchsspieler) is an annual Basketball Bundesliga award that goes to the league's most valuable player who is under age 22, and has German nationality. The award was handed out for the first time in the 2001–02 season, as the Rookie of the Year award.

== Winners ==
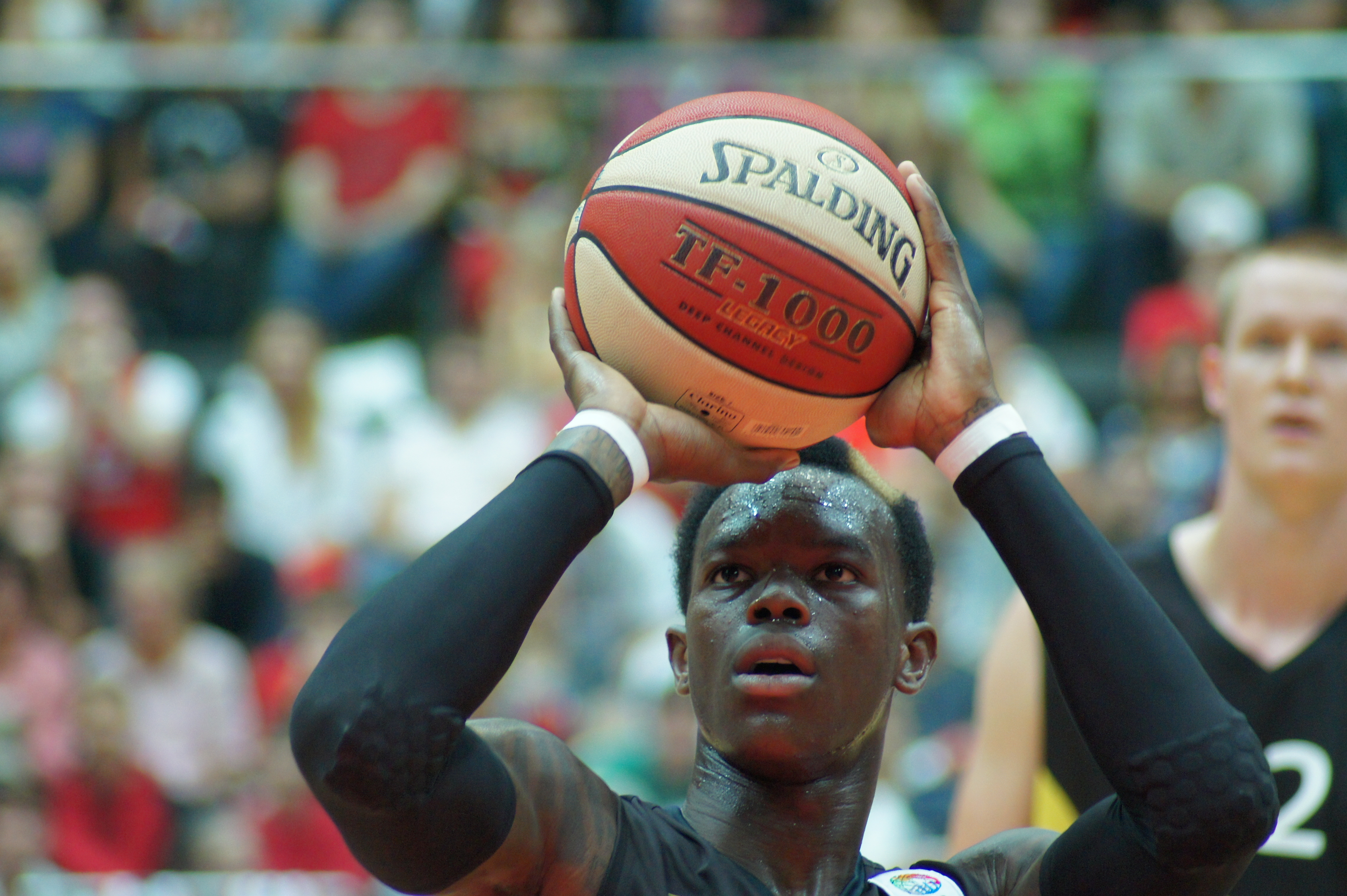
Dennis Schröder was the Basketball Bundesliga Best Young German Player in 2013.

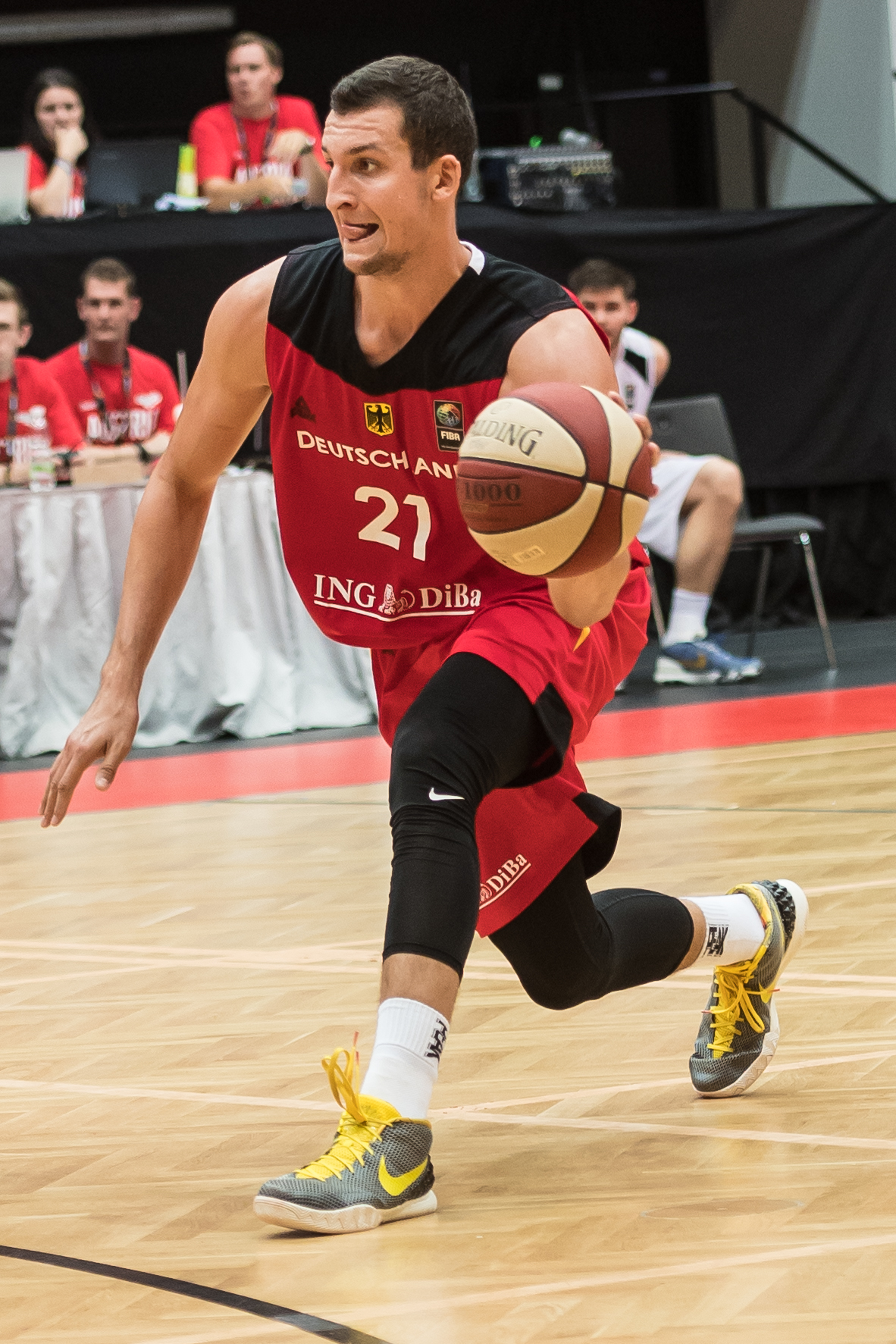
Paul Zipser was the Basketball Bundesliga Best Young German Player in 2016.

Player (X)	Denotes the number of times the player has won the award

Note: Flags indicate national team eligibility at FIBA-sanctioned events. Players may hold other non-FIBA nationalities not displayed.

Season	Player	Pos.	Nat.	Team	Ref
Rookie of the Year (2001–02 to 2009–10)
2001–02	Marcus Goree	C	(United States)	Skyliners Frankfurt	
2002–03	Szymon Szewczyk	PF	(Poland)	Braunschweig	
2003–04	Aleksandar Ćapin	PG	(Slovenia)	Telekom Baskets Bonn	
2004–05	Koko Archibong	SF	(Nigeria)	Brose Baskets	
2005–06	Anton Gavel	SG	(Germany)	Gießen 46ers	
2006–07	Nicolai Simon	SG	(Germany)	ALBA Berlin	
2007–08	Philipp Schwethelm	SF	(Germany)	Köln 99ers	
2008–09	Per Günther	PG	(Germany)	ratiopharm Ulm	
2009–10	Tibor Pleiß	C	(Germany)	Brose Baskets	
Best German Player Under–24 (2010–11 to 2012–13)
2010–11	Tibor Pleiß (2)	C	(Germany)	Brose Baskets	
2011–12	Maik Zirbes	C	(Germany)	TBB Trier	
2012–13	Dennis Schröder	PG	(Germany)	New Yorker Phantoms Braunschweig	
Best German Player Under–23 (2013–14 to 2014–15)
2013–14	Daniel Theis	C	(Germany)	ratiopharm ulm	
2014–15	Johannes Voigtmann	C	(Germany)	Fraport Skyliners	
Best German Player Under–22 (2015–16 to present)
2015–16	Paul Zipser	SF	(Germany)	Bayern Munich	
2016–17	İsmet Akpınar	PG	(Germany)	ALBA Berlin	
2017–18	Andreas Obst	G	(Germany)	Rockets	
2018–19	Franz Wagner	F	(Germany)	Alba Berlin	
2019–20	No award was given, due to the shortened season because of the COVID-19 pandemic.				
2020–21	Justus Hollatz	PG	(Germany)	Hamburg Towers	
2021–22	Justus Hollatz (2)	PG	(Germany)	Hamburg Towers	
2022–23	Malte Delow	G/F	(Germany)	Alba Berlin	
2023–24	Johann Grünloh	C	(Germany)	Rasta Vechta	
2024–25	Sananda Fru	PF	(Germany)	Basketball Löwen Braunschweig	
2025–26	Jack Kayil	G	(Germany)	Alba Berlin	
