= 2011 BBL Champions Cup =

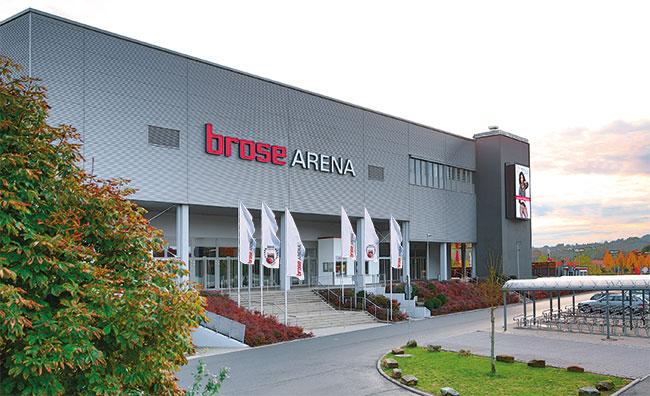
- The game was played in the Brose Arena
New Yorker Phantoms Braunschweig	Brose Baskets
66	86
- Date: October 1, 2011
- Venue: Brose Arena, Bamberg
- Attendance: 5,200

The 2011 BBL Champions Cup was the sixth edition of the super cup game in German basketball, and was played on October 1, 2011. The game was played in the Brose Arena in Bamberg.

== Match ==
October 1, 2011
20:00

Boxscore

Brose Baskets	86–66	New Yorker Phantoms Braunschweig
Scoring by quarter: 20–16, 22–15, 21–13, 23–22
Pts: Brian Roberts 17; Rebs: Anthony Tucker 6 Asts: Julius Jenkins 5		Pts: Stephen Dennis 16; Rebs: Rich Metzer 6 Asts: 2 players 2

Brose Arena, Bamberg
Attendance: 5,200

Brose	Braunschweig

2011 Champions Cup Winners
Brose Baskets
(3rd title)
