= Niels Giffey =

German basketball player (born 1991)

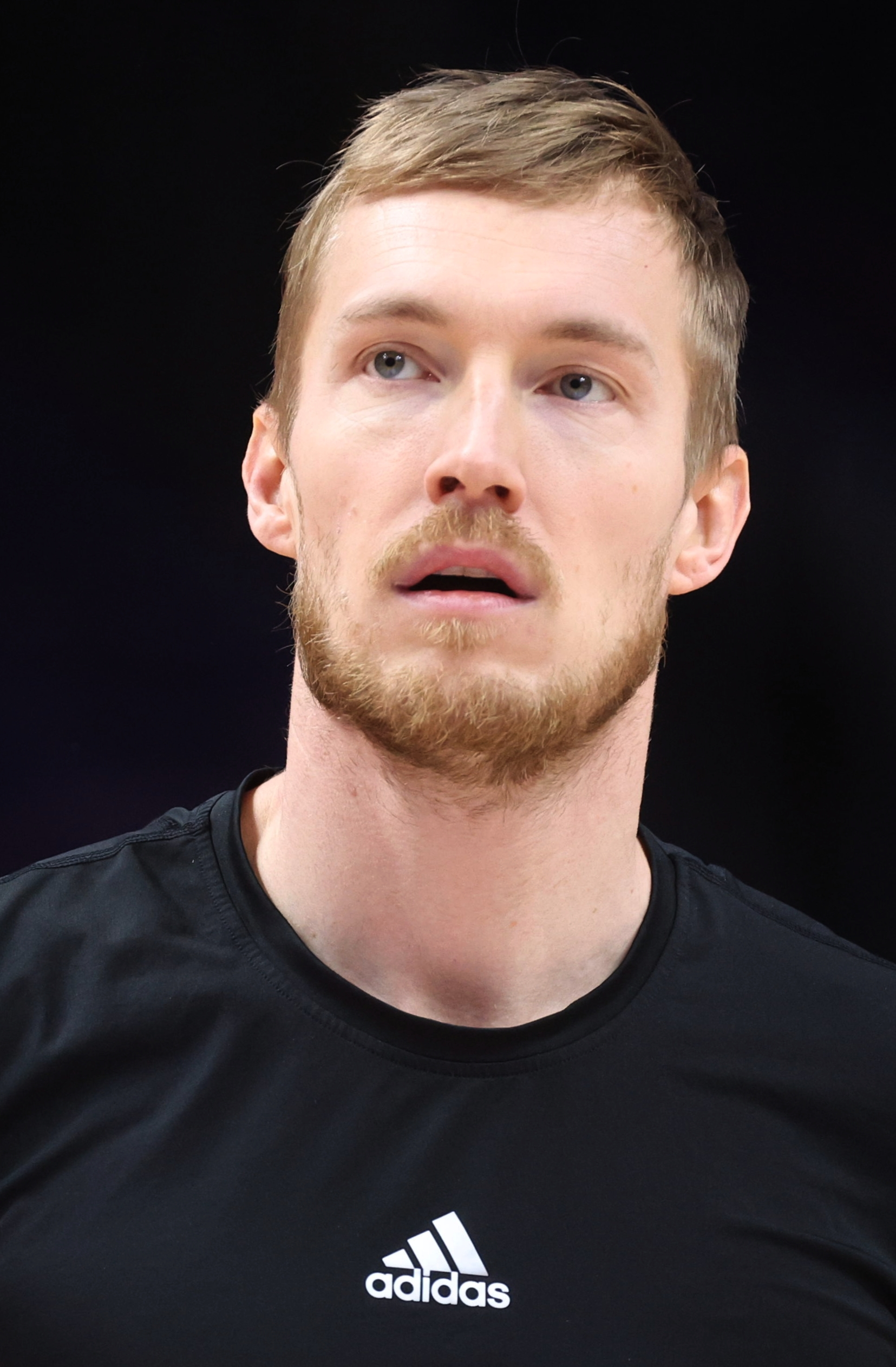
- Giffey with Bayern Munich in 2025

No. 5 – Bayern Munich
- Position: Power forward / small forward
- League: BBL; EuroLeague

Personal information
- Born: 8 June 1991 (age 35) Berlin, Germany
- Listed height: 2.01 m (6 ft 7 in)
- Listed weight: 205 lb (93 kg)

Career information
- High school: Heinrich Schliemann (Berlin, Germany)
- College: UConn (2010–2014)
- NBA draft: 2014: undrafted
- Playing career: 2014–present

Career history
- 2014–2021: Alba Berlin
- 2021–2022: Žalgiris Kaunas
- 2022: Murcia
- 2022–present: Bayern Munich

Career highlights
- King Mindaugas Cup winner (2022); 3× BBL champion (2020, 2021, 2024); 4× German Cup champion (2016, 2020, 2023, 2024); German Supercup champion (2014); 2× NCAA champion (2011, 2014)
Medals
Men's basketball
Representing Germany
FIBA World Cup
Gold medal – first place	2023 Philippines–Japan–Indonesia
EuroBasket
Bronze medal – third place	2022 Czech Republic–Georgia–Italy–Germany

Niels Giffey (born 8 June 1991) is a German professional basketball player for Bayern Munich of the German Basketball Bundesliga (BBL) and the EuroLeague. Standing at 6 ft 7 in (2.01 m), he plays the small forward and shooting guard positions. He also represents the Germany national team.

He played collegiately for the University of Connecticut Huskies men's basketball team. In his freshman year, he was part of the team that won the 2011 NCAA Men's Division I Basketball Tournament. He was again one of UConn's key players when they won the NCAA tournament for a second time in four years in 2014. Giffey and his UConn teammates Shabazz Napier and Tyler Olander are the only Division I men's basketball players in history to have won national championships as freshmen and seniors.

== Early life ==
Giffey was born on 9 June 1991 in Berlin. He is the son of Frank and Christine Giffey. He attended Heinrich-Schliemann-Oberschule gymnasium and competed for the club team Alba Berlin. His aunt Franziska Giffey was the mayor of Berlin.

== College career ==
Giffey committed to play basketball at the University of Connecticut under coach Jim Calhoun. As a freshman, he was a reserve on the squad which won the 2011 NCAA Men's Division I Basketball Tournament. After winning the tournament, he said, “It was such an emotional time for me, that this university, this team, became such a big part of my heart and became so close to me that it never crossed my mind to leave this place. I always felt it was about being a student-athlete at UConn. This school gave me so much when I won my national championship with this team.” Giffey scored four points and grabbed six rebounds in the championship game against Butler. On the season, he averaged 2.2 points and 1.4 rebounds in 9.9 minutes per game.

As a sophomore, Giffey averaged 2.6 points and 1.5 rebounds per game. He missed the first game of the season after hyperextending his elbow in the preseason.

As a junior, he averaged 4.9 points and 3.6 rebounds per game. He injured his knee in a game against Cincinnati on 3 March 2013 and missed the remainder of the season.

In the semifinal game of the 2014 American Athletic Conference men's basketball tournament Giffey scored a career-high 24 points, including 6 three-pointers, to help Connecticut defeat Memphis 72–53 on 14 March 2014.

== Professional career ==
Following graduation, Giffey played on the 2014 Memphis Grizzlies summer league team and then the Utah Jazz summer league team. On 15 July 2014, the German team Alba Berlin announced that they had signed him for three seasons.

On 29 July 2019, Giffey extended his contract with Alba for two more seasons, until 2022. Serving as the Berlin team captain, Giffey won the German national championship as well as the German Cup competition in 2020. During the 2020–21 season, he averaged 8 points and 2.8 rebounds per game.

On 18 June 2021, Giffey signed with Žalgiris Kaunas of the Lithuanian Basketball League (LKL). On 17 June 2022, he parted ways with the club.

On 11 October 2022, Giffey signed a short-term deal with UCAM Murcia of the Liga ACB.

On 8 November 2022, Giffey signed with Bayern Munich of the Basketball Bundesliga (BBL) until the end of the 2024–25 season.

== National team career ==
Giffey first represented Germany in international competition at the youth level, during the 2007 FIBA U16 European Championship Division B. He would finish the event leading the Germany U16 national team in both scoring at 14.7 points, and rebounding at 5.8 per game. The following year, he was named to the Germany U18 national team for the 2008 FIBA U18 European Championship. Giffey finished the tournament averaging 6.8 points, 2.8 rebounds and 1.5 assists per game.

Two years later, Giffey was selected to the Germany U20 national team for the 2011 FIBA U20 European Championship. Giffey would complete the event with averages of 10.4 points, 2.9 rebounds and 1.4 assists per game.

Giffey's first tournament with the senior Germany national team came at EuroBasket 2013, where he contributed with averages of 9.2 points and 3.2 rebounds per game.

The next international tournament for Giffey with Germany, would occur six years later, at the 2019 FIBA World Cup, where he played a limited role during the competition. At the 2020 Summer Olympics in Tokyo, Giffey finished the event averaging 7.3 points and 1.8 rebounds per game.

In 2022, Giffey helped Germany earn a bronze medal finish at the EuroBasket, producing 5.9 points and 1.9 rebounds per game. The following year, he was a member of Germany's 2023 FIBA World Cup title winning squad, averaging 3.1 points per game during the event.

== Honours and titles ==
=== Team ===
Alba Berlin

- 2x Basketball Bundesliga: 2019–20, 2020–21
- 2× BBL-Pokal: 2016, 2020
- German Supercup: 2014

UCONN

- 2× NCAA champion: 2011, 2014

== Career statistics ==
Legend
GP	Games played	GS	Games started	MPG	Minutes per game
FG%	Field-goal percentage	3P%	3-point field-goal percentage	FT%	Free-throw percentage
RPG	Rebounds per game	APG	Assists per game	SPG	Steals per game
BPG	Blocks per game	PPG	Points per game	PIR	Performance index rating
**Bold**	Career high

=== EuroLeague ===
*	Led the league

Year	Team	GP	GS	MPG	FG%	3P%	FT%	RPG	APG	SPG	BPG	PPG	PIR
2014–15	Alba Berlin	24	**15**	15.2	.443	.396	.400	2.3	.2	.5	.1	4.9	2.6
2019–20	Alba Berlin	28*	8	18.8	.486	.478	.851	2.2	1.2	**.8**	.3	**8.8**	7.6
2020–21	Alba Berlin	24	5	**20.0**	.487	.418	.792	**2.9**	**1.4**	**.8**	**.4**	8.1	**8.3**
2021–22	Žalgiris	28	5	16.3	.430	.345	.882	2.7	.8	.6	.1	5.6	5.1
2022–23	Bayern Munich	26	4	19.4	**.500**	**.482**	**.929**	2.6	.7	.7	.0	6.8	6.7
2023–24	Bayern Munich	**31**	7	13.1	.382	.277	.733	1.7	.4	.5	.0	3.0	2.6
Career		161	44	17.0	.462	.405	.823	2.4	.8	.6	.2	6.1	5.4

=== EuroCup ===
Year	Team	GP	GS	MPG	FG%	3P%	FT%	RPG	APG	SPG	BPG	PPG	PIR
2015–16	Alba Berlin	6	3	17.7	.318	.222	**1.000**	**3.5**	1.0	.7	—	4.8	6.3
2016–17	Alba Berlin	14	**10**	19.4	.478	**.429**	.917	2.4	.9	.6	.1	6.6	5.3
2017–18	Alba Berlin	12	4	19.7	.451	.387	.588	2.8	1.3	.6	.2	7.2	6.9
2018–19	Alba Berlin	**24**	2	**21.1**	**.482**	.427	.793	2.8	**1.3**	**.8**	**.3**	**10.5**	**9.9**
Career		56	19	20.1	.465	.409	.803	2.8	1.2	.7	.2	8.2	7.7

=== Basketball Champions League ===
Year	Team	GP	GS	MPG	FG%	3P%	FT%	RPG	APG	SPG	BPG	PPG
2022–23	UCAM Murcia	1	0	23.8	.750	1.000	1.000	4.0	—	2.0	—	10.0
Career		1	0	23.8	.750	1.000	1.000	4.0	—	2.0	—	10.0

=== Domestic leagues ===
Year	Team	League	GP	MPG	FG%	3P%	FT%	RPG	APG	SPG	BPG	PPG
2007–08	(Germany) Lichterfelde	ProB	17	10.9	.333	.308	.667	1.2	.8	.2	—	2.4
2014–15	(Germany) Alba Berlin	BBL	42	17.0	.471	.450	.700	2.7	.7	.4	.3	6.8
2015–16	(Germany) Alba Berlin	BBL	21	19.1	.438	.350	.903	3.9	.8	.5	.1	6.0
2016–17	(Germany) Alba Berlin	BBL	37	21.2	.545	.384	.746	3.9	1.3	.8	.4	8.1
2017–18	(Germany) Alba Berlin	BBL	42	18.7	.502	.478	.825	2.6	1.0	.9	.4	7.9
2018–19	(Germany) Alba Berlin	BBL	40	19.1	.523	.353	.921	2.2	1.1	1.0	.1	9.6
2019–20	(Germany) Alba Berlin	BBL	29	19.1	.525	.385	.924	2.9	1.3	.5	.2	10.2
2020–21	(Germany) Alba Berlin	BBL	34	20.3	.502	.400	.892	3.6	1.3	.6	.1	10.2
2021–22	(Lithuania) Žalgiris	LKL	39	18.5	.458	.385	.826	3.3	1.2	1.1	.1	5.9
2022–23	(Spain) UCAM Murcia	ACB	4	20.6	.400	.000	1.000	3.0	1.0	1.2	.2	5.0
2022–23	(Germany) Bayern Munich	BBL	32	21.5	.478	.410	.882	3.2	1.2	.6	.2	7.4
2023–24	(Germany) Bayern Munich	BBL	41	17.9	.533	.446	.806	2.6	.9	.8	.3	5.8

=== College ===
Year	Team	GP	GS	MPG	FG%	3P%	FT%	RPG	APG	SPG	BPG	PPG
2010–11	Connecticut	**41**	10	9.9	.403	.324	.810	1.4	.4	.2	.1	2.2
2011–12	Connecticut	30	4	11.7	.446	.429	.792	1.5	.4	.3	.2	2.6
2012–13	Connecticut	28	1	21.0	.417	.294	**.878**	3.6	.6	**.9**	.3	4.9
2013–14	Connecticut	40	**16**	**24.7**	**.540**	**.483**	.727	**3.8**	**.8**	.7	**.5**	**8.4**
Career		139	31	16.7	.476	.421	.789	2.5	.6	.5	.3	4.6
