= 2007 BBL Champions Cup =

Brose Baskets	Köln 99ers
70	51
- Date: October 2, 2007
- Venue: Arena Ludwigsburg, Ludwigsburg
- Attendance: 3,698

The 2007 BBL Champions Cup was the second edition of the super cup game in German basketball, and was played on October 2, 2007.

== Match ==
September 21, 2006

Köln 99ers	51–70	Brose Baskets

Arena Ludwigsburg, Ludwigsburg
Attendance: 3,698

Köln	Brose

2007 Champions Cup Winners
Brose Baskets
(1st title)
