= Sharrod Ford =

American basketball player (born 1982)

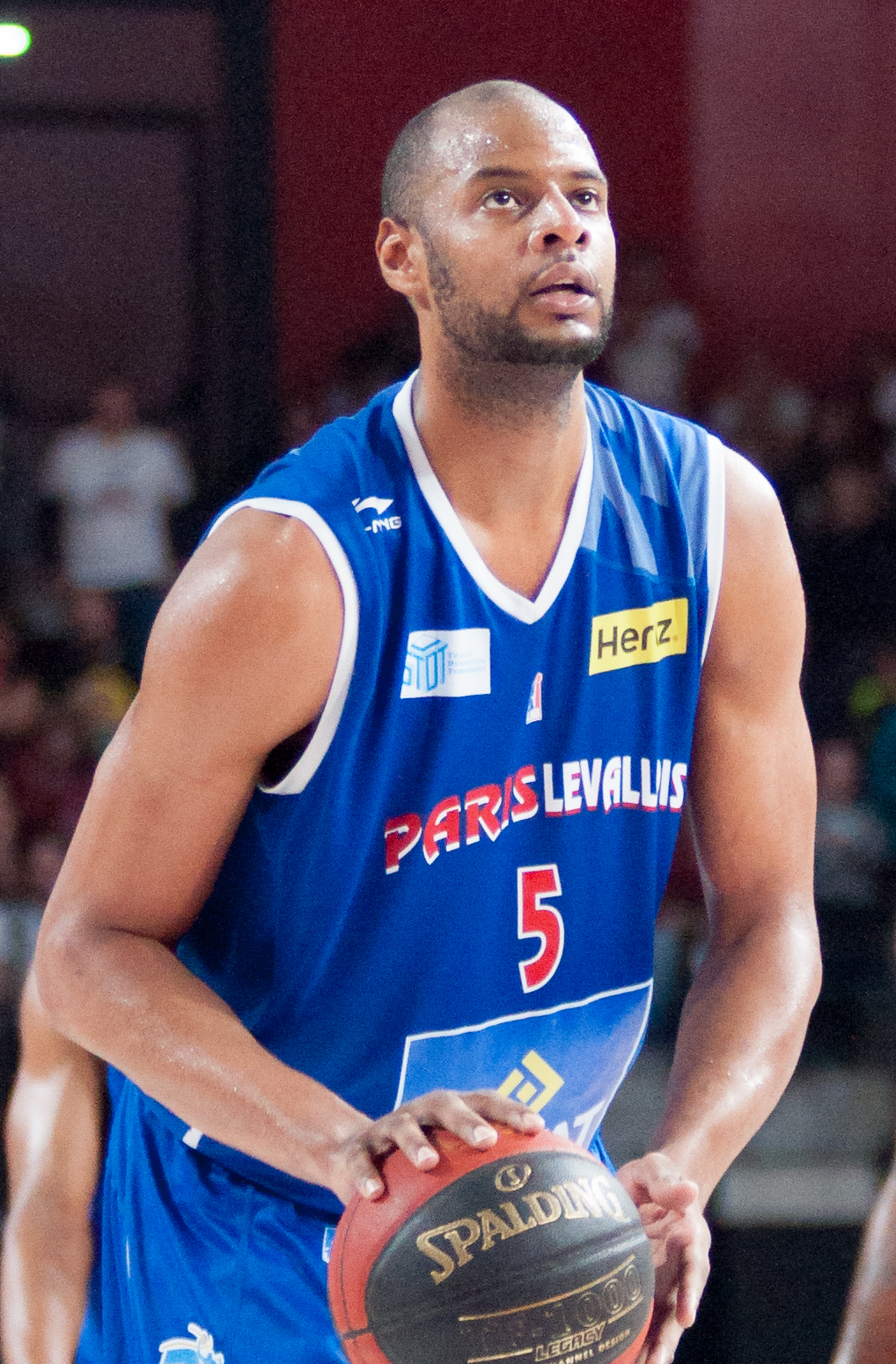
- Ford in 2014

Personal information
- Born: January 9, 1982 (age 44) Washington, D.C.
- Listed height: 6 ft 9 in (2.06 m)
- Listed weight: 243 lb (110 kg)

Career information
- High school: Gwynn Park (Brandywine, Maryland); Hargrave (Chatham, Virginia)
- College: Clemson (2001–2005)
- NBA draft: 2005: undrafted
- Playing career: 2005–2017
- Position: Power forward / center
- Number: 23

Career history
- 2005: Phoenix Suns
- 2006: Fayetteville Patriots
- 2006–2007: Alba Berlin
- 2007–2008: Sutor Montegranaro
- 2008–2009: Virtus Bologna
- 2009–2010: Spartak Saint Petersburg
- 2010: Basket Club Ferrara
- 2010–2011: Sutor Montegranaro
- 2012: Erie BayHawks
- 2012–2014: Brose Baskets
- 2014–2015: Paris-Levallois
- 2015–2017: Acıbadem Üniversitesi

Career highlights
- All-EuroCup Second Team (2015); EuroChallenge champion (2009); German Bundesliga champion (2013); BBL Champions Cup winner (2013); German Cup winner (2006); Third-team All-ACC (2005)
- Stats at NBA.com
- Stats at Basketball Reference

Sharrod Victor Ford (born January 9, 1982) is an American former professional basketball player. He played briefly in the National Basketball Association (NBA), as well as in a variety of top leagues around the world.

== Early years ==
Ford attended Clemson University from 2001 to 2005. At Clemson, he became the school's first player to lead his team in points and rebounds for two consecutive seasons since Horace Grant in the 1980s.

== Professional career ==
Ford went undrafted at the 2005 NBA draft. On November 2, 2005, he signed with the Phoenix Suns. He was waived by the Suns on December 24, 2005, after appearing in three NBA league games.

On January 10, 2006, he was acquired by the Fayetteville Patriots of the NBA D-League. He appeared in 15 games for the Patriots. In February 2006, he moved to Germany and signed with Alba Berlin for the rest of the season. With Alba he won the 2006 German Cup. On July 31, 2006, he re-signed with Alba for one more season.

For the 2007–08 season, he signed with the Italian club Sutor Montegranaro. For the 2008–09 season, he moved to Virtus Bologna, also of Italy. With Bologna, he won the 2008–09 FIBA EuroChallenge.

On September 18, 2009, he signed with Spartak Saint Petersburg. On November 16, 2009, he parted ways with Spartak. On January 10, 2010, he returned to Italy, and signed with Basket Club Ferrara, for the rest of the season. On July 19, 2010, he returned to his former team. Sutor Montegranaro. for the 2010–11 season.

On July 21, 2011, he signed with Bayern Munich. However, he left the team during the pre-season. In February 2012, he joined the Erie BayHawks of the NBA D-League, but left after only 6 games.

On August 20, 2012, he signed with the German club Brose Baskets. With Brose Baskets, he won the 2012–13 Bundesliga, and the 2013 BBL Champions Cup. On July 29, 2013, he re-signed with Brose for one more season.

On June 30, 2014, he signed a one-year deal with Paris-Levallois. On April 16, 2015, he was named to the All-EuroCup Second Team, after averaging 15.1 points and 8.8 rebounds per game.

On July 24, 2015, he signed with Acıbadem Üniversitesi of the Turkish Basketball Second League. On August 3, 2016, he re-signed with Acıbadem Üniversitesi for one more season.
