= 2010 BBL Champions Cup =

Deutsche Bank Skyliners	Brose Baskets
58	85
- Date: September 26, 2010
- Venue: JAKO-Arena, Bamberg
- Attendance: 5,000

The 2010 BBL Champions Cup was the fifth edition of the super cup game in German basketball, and was played on September 26, 2010. The game was played at the JAKO-Arena in Bamberg.

== Match ==
September 26, 2010

Brose Baskets	85–58	Deutsche Bank Skyliners
Pts: Reyshawn Terry 19		Pts: Marius Nolte 12

JAKO-Arena, Bamberg
Attendance: 5,000

Brose	Skyliners

2010 Champions Cup Winners Brose Baskets (2nd title)
