= 2014 BBL Champions Cup =

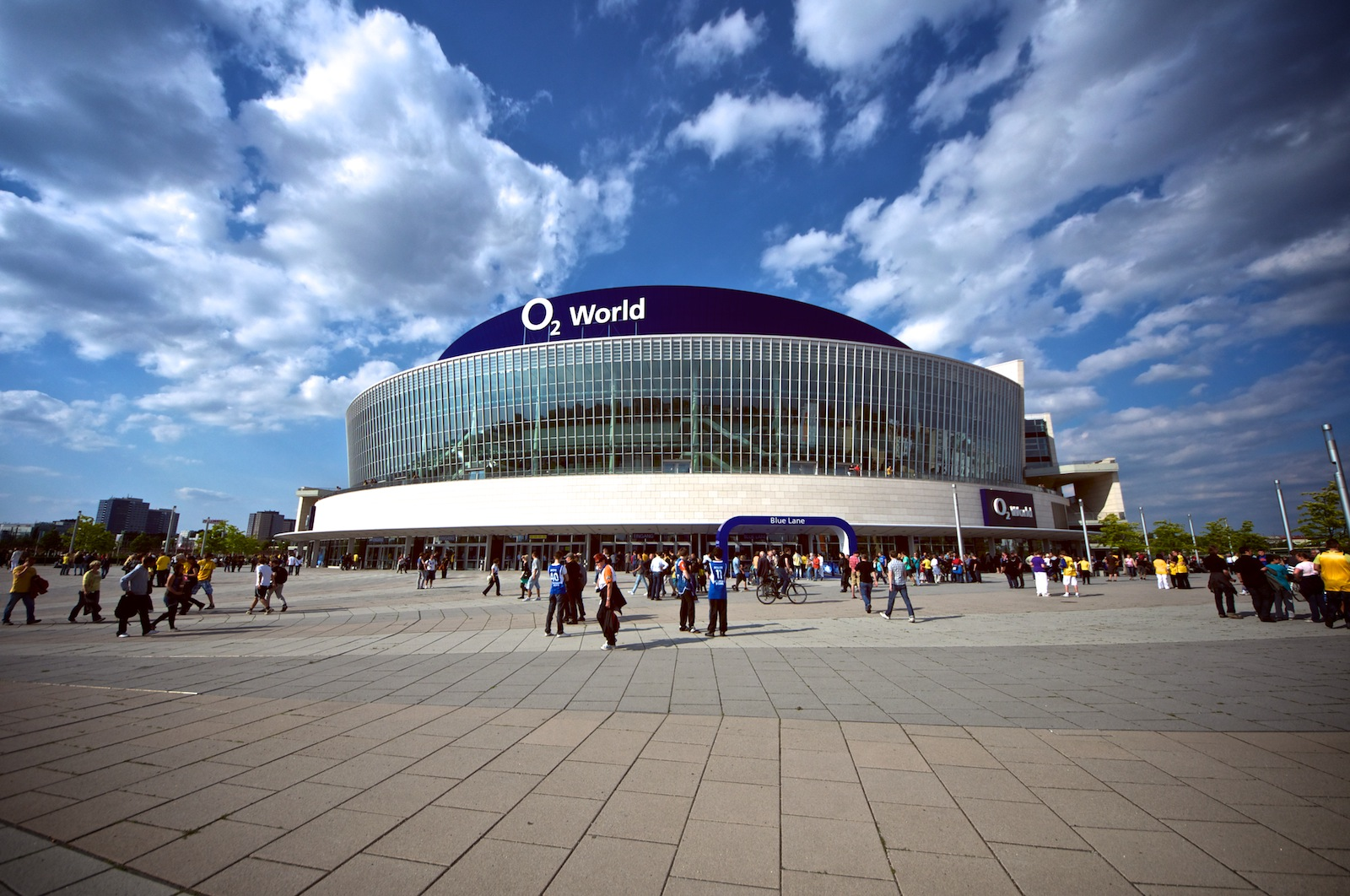
- The game was played at the O_{2} World
FC Bayern Munich	Alba Berlin
68	76
- Date: September 27, 2014
- Venue: O2 World, Berlin
- Attendance: 11,105

The 2014 BBL Champions Cup was a basketball game that was held on September 27, 2014. Basketball Bundesliga champions FC Bayern Munich faced off against BBL-Pokal winners Alba Berlin in the O_{2} World in Berlin.

== Match ==
September 27, 2014
20:30

Boxscore

Alba Berlin	76–68	FC Bayern Munich
Scoring by quarter: 21–11, 24–14, 19–28, 12–15
Pts: McLean 15; Rebs: Stojanovski 7 Asts: Redding 9		Pts: Bryant 14; Rebs: Bryant 9 Asts: Schaffartzik 5

O_{2} World, Berlin
Attendance: 11,105

Alba	FC Bayern

Starters:			Pts	Reb	Ast
G	25	(United States) Cliff Hammonds	11	2	4
G	5	(Germany) Niels Giffey	13	2	0
F	15	(United States) Reggie Redding	8	4	9
F	33	(United States) Jamel McLean	15	4	0
C	43	(Croatia) Leon Radosevic	7	4	0
Reserves:					
G	19	(North Macedonia) Vojdan Stojanovski	13	7	1
F	7	(Germany) Alex King	5	4	0
F	20	(Croatia) Marko Banic	2	4	1
G	11	(Germany) Akeem Vargas	0	0	0
F	21	(Germany) Moritz Wagner	DNP		
Head coach:
(Serbia) Sasa Obradovic

Game rules
Game was played under FIBA rules.

2014 Champions Cup Winners
Alba Berlin
3rd title

Starters:			Pts	Reb	Ast
G	8	(Germany) Heiko Schaffartzik	10	4	5
F	14	(Bosnia and Herzegovina) Nihad Djedovic	4	0	1
F	12	(Germany) Robin Benzing	3	2	0
F	20	(Serbia) Dusko Savanovic	6	6	0
C	54	(United States) John Bryant	14	9	0
Reserves:					
G	10	(Germany) Lucca Staiger	10	1	0
C	15	(Serbia) Vladimir Stimac	10	1	0
C	32	(Germany) Yassin Idbihi	7	2	0
F	45	(Germany) Jan Jagla	3	6	0
F	44	(United States) Bryce Taylor	DNP		
Head coach:
(Serbia) Svetislav Pesic
