= 2013 BBL Champions Cup =

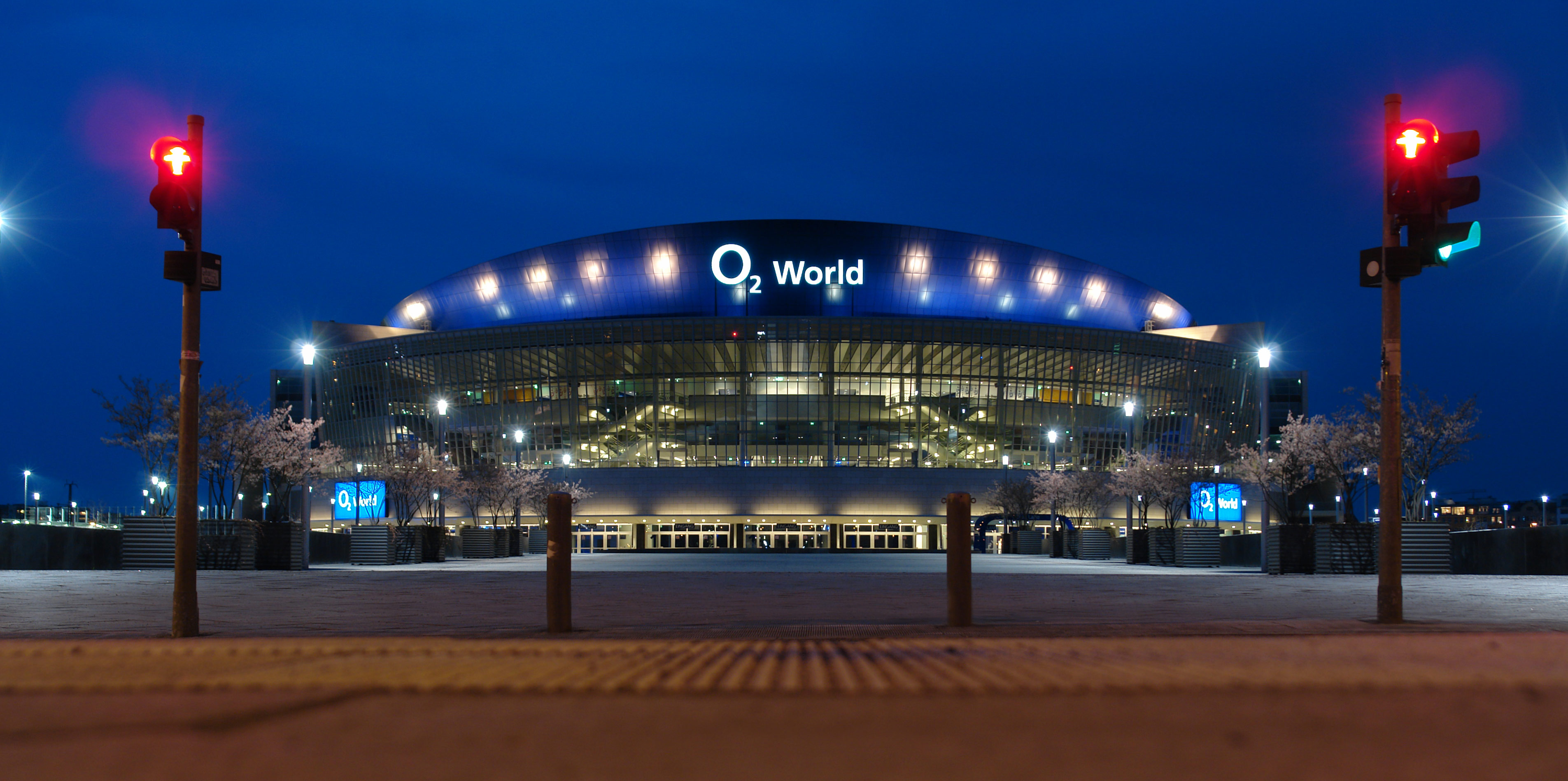
- The game was played in the O_{2} World
Alba Berlin	Brose Baskets
78	79
- Date: September 28, 2013
- Venue: O_{2} World, Berlin
- Attendance: 9,154

The 2013 BBL Champions Cup was the eighth edition of the super cup game in German basketball, and was played on September 28, 2013. The game was played in the O_{2} World in Berlin. Defending Basketball Bundesliga champions Brose Baskets took on BBL-Pokal winners Alba Berlin. Brose Baskets' Rakim Sanders was top scorer in the game, with 19 points. Alba Berlin won its first ever Champions Cup after winning the game 78–79.

== Match ==
September 28, 2013
20:15

Boxscore

Brose Baskets	78–79	Alba Berlin
Scoring by quarter: 24–20, 14–17, 18–18, 23–23
Pts: Sanders 19; Rebs: Sanders, Ford 6 Asts: Ford 4		Pts: Logan, Radosevic 16; Rebs: Radosevic 6 Asts: 3 players 3

O_{2} World, Berlin
Attendance: 9,154

Brose	Alba

2013 Champions Cup Winners Alba Berlin (1st title)
