= 2008 BBL Champions Cup =

Artland Dragons	Alba Berlin
69	84
- Date: September 19, 2008
- Venue: Artland-Arena, Quakenbrück

The 2008 BBL Champions Cup was the third edition of the super cup game in German basketball, and was played on September 19, 2007. The game was played at the Artland-Arena in Quakenbrück.

== Match ==
September 19, 2008

Alba Berlin	84–69	Artland Dragons

Artland-Arena, Quakenbrück

Alba	Artland Dragons

2008 Champions Cup Winners Alba Berlin (1st title)
