= 2006 BBL Champions Cup =

Alba Berlin	RheinEnergie Köln
74	75
- Date: September 21, 2006
- Venue: Max-Schmeling-Halle, Berlin
- Attendance: 7,161

The 2006 BBL Champions Cup was the first edition of the super cup game in German basketball, and was played on September 21, 2006.

== Match ==
September 21, 2006

RheinEnergie Köln	75–74	Alba Berlin

Max-Schmeling-Halle, Berlin
Attendance: 7,161

Köln	Alba

2004 Champions Cup Winners
RheinEnergie Köln
(1st title)
