= FC Bayern Munich (basketball) =

Men's basketball section of the FC Bayern Munich sports club

Bayern Munich
- Leagues: BBL; EuroLeague (Men); Regionalliga South-East (Women)
- Founded: 1946; 80 years ago
- History: FC Bayern Munich Basketball (1946–present)
- Arena: BMW Park & SAP Garden (Men); Säbener Halle (Women)
- Capacity: 6,700 & 12,500 (Men); 1,200 (Women)
- Location: Munich, Germany
- Team colors: Red, white
- Main sponsor: Siegmund
- President: Herbert Hainer
- Head coach: Anton Gavel (Men); Thomas Winter (Women)
- Team captain: Vladimir Lučić (Male); Sandra Arguiñano Holguín (Female)
- Championships: 7 German championships 5 German Cups
- Retired numbers: 2 (6, 24)
- Website: fcbayern.com
Home	Away	Third

FC Bayern München Basketball GmbH, commonly referred to as Bayern Munich, is a professional basketball club, a part of the FC Bayern Munich sports club, based in Munich, Germany. The club competes domestically in the Basketball Bundesliga (BBL) and internationally in the EuroLeague for their male team and in the 2. DBBL for their female team. The club has won six German championships, and five German Cups in its history.

Founded in 1946, Bayern's basketball section had early success in the 1950s and 1960s, before mostly disappearing from the national first level in the following three decades. The team had a resurgence in 2010s and has since been among Germany's best teams, as well as a EuroLeague regular.

Bayern plays its domestic home games at BMW Park, which was opened in 1972, while international games are played at the SAP Garden, which opened in 2024.

FC Bayern Munich Basketball also has a reserve team that plays in German third-tier level ProB.

== History ==
=== Early history (1946–1989) ===
Bayern Munich was founded in 1900 when a number of football enthusiasts split from a Munich gymnastics club (MTV 1879). The basketball section was founded in 1946 after one former football player started the team after retiring from his former sport.

Bayern has a long basketball tradition. Besides its most successful years in the 1950s and 1960s (German championships in 1954, 1955, and German Cup in 1968), the club enjoyed remarkable popularity in 1956, when it even drew 40,000 fans to an open-air test game against Lancia Bolzano, once a top basketball club from Italy. Later, in 1966, the club was a founding member of the Basketball Bundesliga.

Bayern was one of the founding members of the Basketball Bundesliga in 1966.

In the following years, the club slowly, but surely, faded into obscurity, and in 1974, was even relegated to the German 2nd Division. For a long time after that, the club never completely recovered, and only had a few successful years (Bayern moved up to the Basketball Bundesliga in 1987, and stayed there until 1989).

=== Resurgence (2008–2014) ===
In 2008, Bayern Munich, led by then-president Uli Hoeneß and then vice-president Bernd Rauch, announced its plans to return the club to its former glory, and return to the top level Basketball Bundesliga. Two years later, in 2010, Bayern Munich's club members voted in favor of a one-time financial injection in the team, with the aim of bringing it back to the first division. Following its new financial funding, the team announced national team head coach Dirk Bauermann. In 2011, the team became fully professional.

Success in the domestic area followed quickly, as in the 2012–13 season the club reached the BBL semifinals, where it lost 3–2 against the reigning champions Brose Baskets.

=== German power house and EuroLeague (2014–present) ===
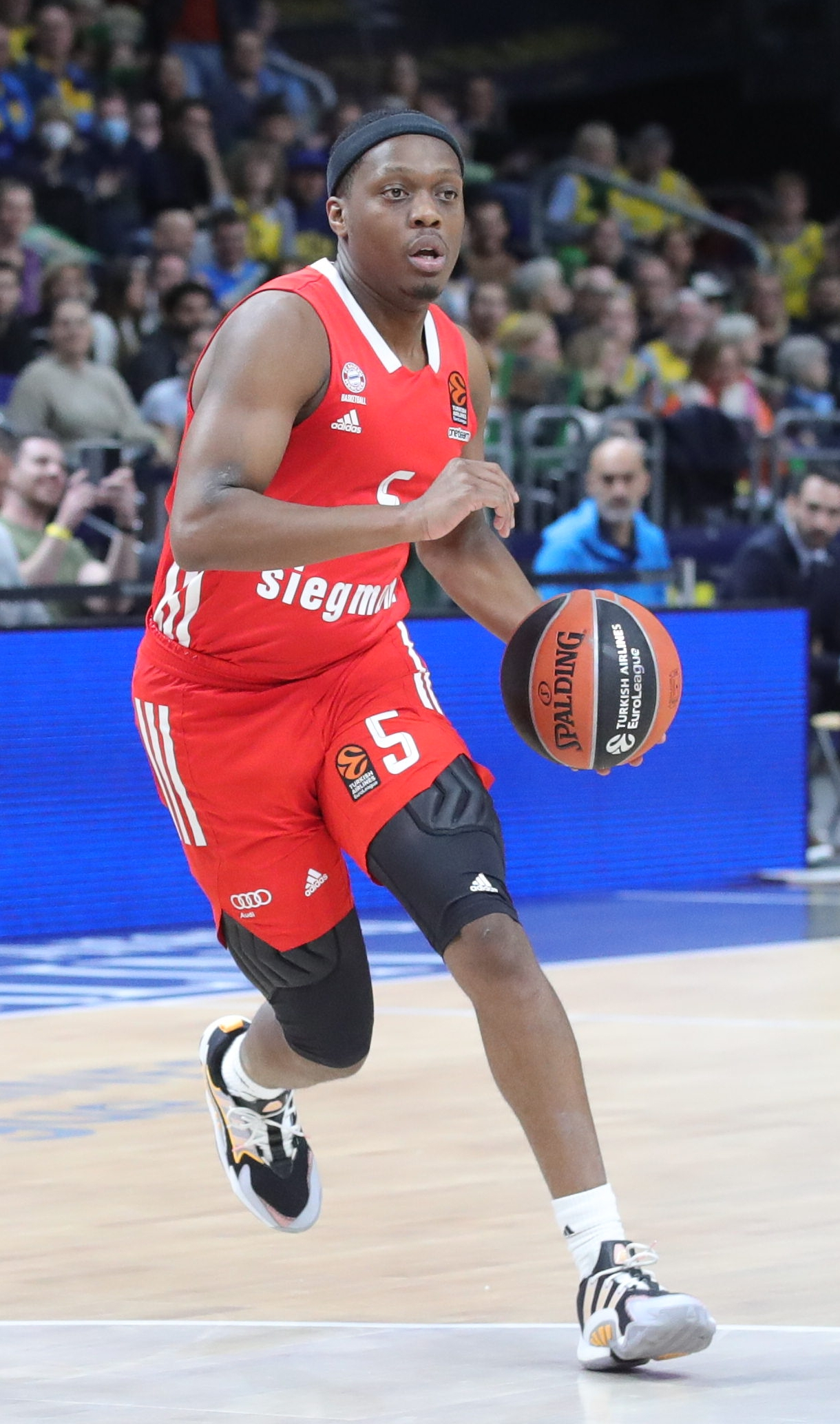
Cassius Winston in 2022

Thanks to a wild card, Bayern Munich played in the EuroLeague in the 2013–14 season. This was its first appearance in the top European championship, and it reached the Top 16 stage in its debut.

On 18 June 2014, Bayern won its third national title when it beat Alba Berlin 3–1 in the Finals. It was the first title for the team in 59 years, its last having been in 1955. The star player of the team was Malcolm Delaney, who won both the MVP and Finals MVP awards.

In the 2014–15 season, Bayern failed to win a title. In the BBL Finals they were defeated by Brose Baskets, 3–2. The team had to wait until 2018 for its next championship, as they beat Alba Berlin 3–2 in the Finals that year. By winning the BBL, Bayern also qualified for the following EuroLeague season.

In the following years, Bayern Munich became a power house in the BBL, as well as a regular in the EuroLeague.

== Home arena ==
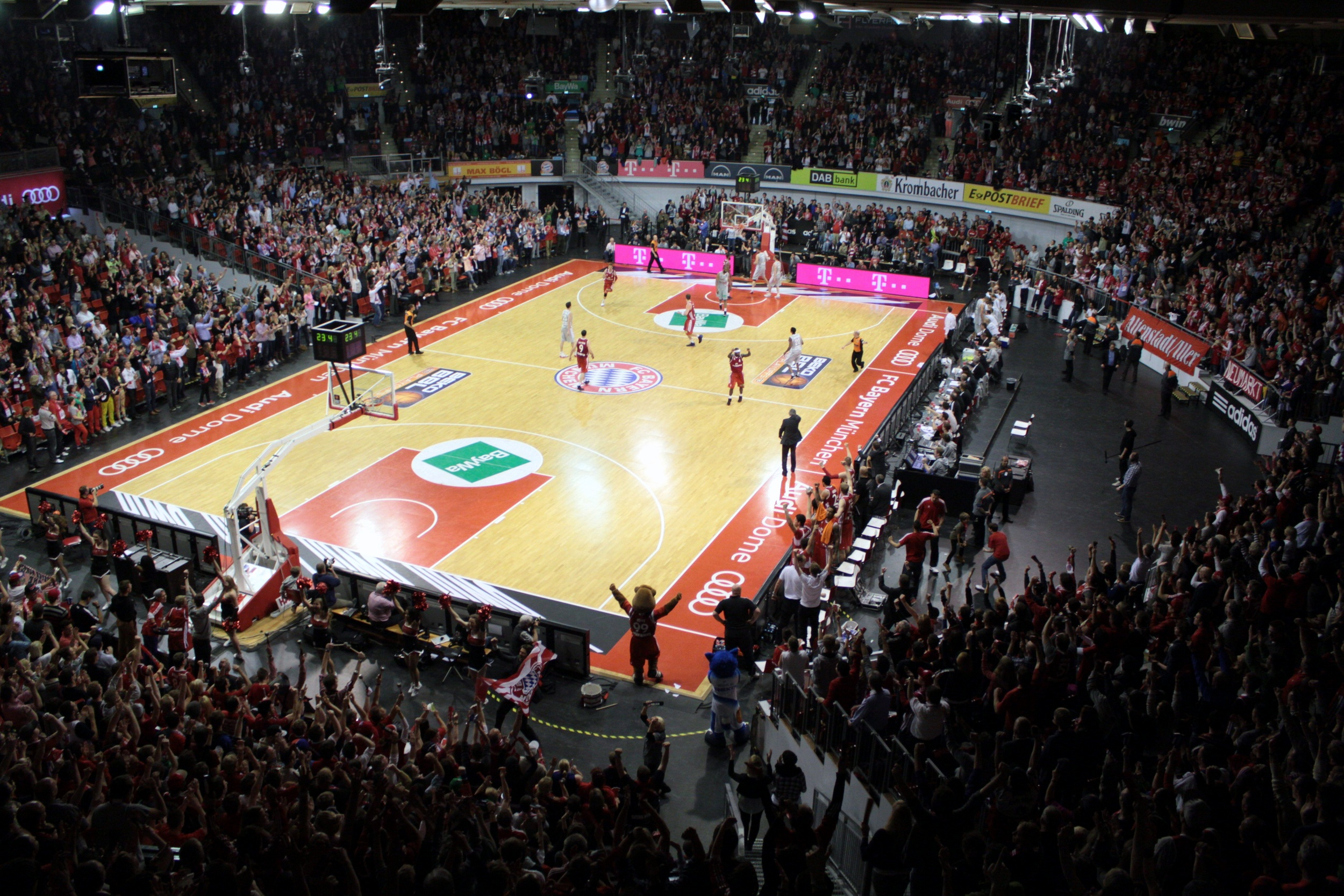
A Bayern Munich home game inside the Audi Dome.

The team's home arena is called BMW Park, which seats 6,700 spectators.

=== New arena ===
The team's home arena for EuroLeague games is called SAP Garden, which seats 12,500 spectators.

== Players ==
=== Retired numbers ===
FC Bayern Munich retired numbers
No	Nat.	Player	Position	Tenure
6	(Germany)	Steffen Hamann	PG	2010–2014
24	(Germany)	Demond Greene	SG	2010–2014

=== Current roster ===
Note: Flags indicate national team eligibility at FIBA-sanctioned events. Players may hold other non-FIBA nationalities not displayed.

FC Bayern Munich roster
Players
Coaches

Pos.	No.	Nat.	Name	Ht.	Wt.	Age
PF	0	(United States)	Norris, Miles	2.01 m (6 ft 7 in)	100 kg (220 lb)	26 – 15 April 2000
F/C	1	(Germany)	da Silva, Oscar	2.06 m (6 ft 9 in)	104 kg (229 lb)	28 – 21 September 1998
SF	3	(United States)	Beauchamp, MarJon	2.00 m (6 ft 7 in)	95 kg (209 lb)	26 – 12 October 2000
PG	4	(Germany) (United States)	Washington Jr., Duane	1.91 m (6 ft 3 in)	89 kg (196 lb)	26 – 24 March 2000
F	5	(Germany)	Giffey, Niels	2.01 m (6 ft 7 in)	93 kg (205 lb)	35 – 8 July 1991
F/C	7	(Germany)	Voigtmann, Johannes	2.11 m (6 ft 11 in)	115 kg (254 lb)	34 – 30 September 1992
G/F	8	(Denmark)	Jensen, Tobias	1.98 m (6 ft 6 in)	92 kg (203 lb)	22 – 8 May 2004
SG	10	(United States)	Jessup, Justinian	2.01 m (6 ft 7 in)	97 kg (214 lb)	28 – 23 May 1998
F	11	(Serbia)	Lučić, Vladimir (C)	2.01 m (6 ft 7 in)	95 kg (209 lb)	37 – 17 June 1989
SG	13	(Germany)	Obst, Andreas	1.91 m (6 ft 3 in)	81 kg (179 lb)	30 – 13 July 1996
PF	17	(Germany)	Fischer, Killian (Y)	2.05 m (6 ft 9 in)	96 kg (212 lb)	19 – 8 February 2007
PG	21	(Germany)	Hollatz, Justus	1.91 m (6 ft 3 in)	95 kg (209 lb)	25 – 21 April 2001
C	23	(Ukraine)	Yiamu, Desmond (Y)	1.99 m (6 ft 6 in)	105 kg (231 lb)	20 – 29 September 2006
PG	31	(Lithuania)	Jokubaitis, Rokas	1.93 m (6 ft 4 in)	87 kg (192 lb)	26 – 19 November 2000
F/C	32	(Germany)	Thiemann, Johannes	2.06 m (6 ft 9 in)	110 kg (243 lb)	32 – 9 February 1994
SF	37	(Germany)	Vossenberg, Caspar (Y)	2.02 m (6 ft 8 in)	99 kg (218 lb)	17 – 17 March 2009
SG	39	(Germany)	Jerkić, Niko (Y)	2.03 m (6 ft 8 in)	92 kg (203 lb)	19 – 13 September 2007
PG	42	(Serbia)	Šušić, Andrija (Y)	1.95 m (6 ft 5 in)	86 kg (190 lb)	18 – 9 April 2008
C	50	(United States)	Wiley, Austin	2.11 m (6 ft 11 in)	116 kg (256 lb)	27 – 8 January 1999

Head coach

- (Germany) (Slovakia) Anton Gavel

Assistant coach(es)

- (Germany) Arne Woltmann
- (Finland) Daniel Herbert
- (Serbia) Mihajlo Mitić

Athletic trainer(s)

- (Serbia) Ivan Pijanec

Legend

- (C) Team captain
- Injured

- Roster
Updated: November 10, 2026

=== Players on dual registration with FC Bayern Munich II ===
Players on dual registration with FC Bayern Munich II
Nat.	Jersey Number	Player	Position	Age
(Germany)	17	Killian Fischer	PF	8 February 2007 (age 19)
(Ukraine)	23	Desmond Yiamu	C	29 September 2006 (age 20)
(Germany)	37	Caspar Vossenberg	SF	17 March 2009 (age 17)
(Germany)	39	Niko Jerkić	SG	13 September 2007 (age 19)
(Serbia)	42	Andrija Šušić	PG	9 April 2008 (age 18)

=== Depth chart ===
Pos.	Starting 5	Bench 1	Bench 2	Bench 3
C	Johannes Thiemann	Austin Wiley	Johannes Voigtmann	Desmond Yiamu
PF	Oscar da Silva	Miles Norris		Killian Fischer
SF	Vladimir Lučić	MarJon Beauchamp	Niels Giffey	Caspar Vossenberg
SG	Andreas Obst	Justinian Jessup	Tobias Jensen	Niko Jerkić
PG	Rokas Jokubaitis	Duane Washington Jr.	Justus Hollatz	Andrija Šušić

== Notable players ==
Note: Flags indicate national team eligibility at FIBA-sanctioned events. Players may hold other non-FIBA nationalities not displayed.

Criteria

To appear in this section a player must have either:

- Set a club record or won an individual award while at the club
- Played at least one official international match for their national team at any time
- Played at least one official NBA match at any time.

- (Germany) İsmet Akpınar
- (Germany) Danilo Barthel
- (Germany) Robin Benzing
- (Germany) Isaac Bonga
- (Germany) Oscar da Silva
- (Germany) Bastian Doreth
- (Germany) Robert Garrett
- (Germany) Anton Gavel
- (Germany) Jason George
- (Germany) Niels Giffey
- (Germany) Demond Greene
- (Germany) Steffen Hamann
- (Germany) Elias Harris
- (Germany) Justus Hollatz
- (Germany) Yassin Idbihi
- (Germany) Jan Jagla
- (Germany) Karim Jallow
- (Germany) Ivan Kharchenkov
- (Germany) Alex King
- (Germany) Maxi Kleber
- (Germany) David Krämer
- (Germany) Hans-Jörg Krüger
- (Germany) Maodo Lô
- (Germany) Robert Maras
- (Germany) Joshua Obiesie
- (Germany) Andreas Obst
- (Germany) Heiko Schaffartzik
- (Germany) Gavin Schilling
- (Germany) Philipp Schwethelm
- (Germany) Andreas Seiferth
- (Germany) Lucca Staiger
- (Germany) Helmut Uhlig
- (Germany) Johannes Voigtmann
- (Germany) Nelson Weidemann
- (Germany) Nick Weiler-Babb
- (Germany) Jan Niklas Wimberg
- (Germany) Paul Zipser
- (Germany) Maik Zirbes
- (Serbia) Nemanja Dangubić
- (Serbia) Ognjen Jaramaz
- (Serbia) Stefan Jović
- (Serbia) Vladimir Lučić
- (Serbia) Milan Mačvan
- (Serbia) Vasilije Micić
- (Serbia) Aleksandar Nađfeji
- (Serbia) DeMarcus Nelson
- (Serbia) Duško Savanović
- (Serbia) Boris Savović
- (Serbia) Vladimir Štimac
- (United States) Wade Baldwin IV
- (United States) Devin Booker
- (United States) John Bryant
- (United States) Zylan Cheatham
- (United States) Jared Cunningham
- (United States) Malcolm Delaney
- (United States) Spencer Dinwiddie
- (United States) Carsen Edwards
- (United States) Freddie Gillespie
- (United States) James Gist
- (United States) Ben Hansbrough
- (United States) Darrun Hilliard
- (United States) Josh Huestis
- (United States) Othello Hunter
- (United States) JaJuan Johnson
- (United States) Nick Johnson
- (United States) Greg Monroe
- (United States) Lawrence Roberts
- (United States) Bryce Taylor
- (United States) Malcolm Thomas
- (United States) Chevon Troutman
- (United States) Derrick Williams
- (United States) Cassius Winston
- (Czech Republic) Ondřej Balvín
- (Turkey) Onuralp Bitim
- (Argentina) Leandro Bolmaro
- (Cameroon) Ruben Boumtje-Boumtje
- (Croatia) Danko Branković
- (Zimbabwe) Vitalis Chikoko
- (Montenegro) Justin Cobbs
- (Bosnia and Herzegovina) Nihad Đedović
- (Italy) Diego Flaccadori
- (France) Sylvain Francisco
- (Bosnia and Herzegovina) Amar Gegić
- (Israel) Yotam Halperin
- (Bulgaria) Jared Homan
- (Spain) Serge Ibaka
- (Finland) Petteri Koponen
- (France) Mathias Lessort
- (Israel) Yam Madar
- (North Macedonia) Bo McCalebb
- (Puerto Rico) Shabazz Napier
- (Austria) Marvin Ogunsipe
- (Nigeria) Nedu Onyeuku
- (Montenegro) Dino Radončić
- (Croatia) Leon Radošević
- (Bosnia and Herzegovina) Alex Renfroe
- (Montenegro) Tyrese Rice
- (Wales) Stuart Robbins
- (Croatia) Matej Rudan
- (Slovenia) Žan Mark Šiško
- (Ivory Coast) Deon Thompson
- (Australia) Jack White

=== Players at the NBA draft ===
*	Denotes player who has been selected for at least one All-Star Game and All-NBA Team
^{#}	Denotes player who has never appeared in an NBA regular-season or playoff game
^{~}	Denotes player who has been selected as Rookie of the Year

Position	Player	Year	Round	Pick	Drafted by
SG/SF	(Germany) Paul Zipser	2016	2nd round	48th	Chicago Bulls

== Head coaches ==
- Dirk Bauermann
- Yannis Christopoulos
- Aleksandar Đorđević
- Gordon Herbert
- Oliver Kostić
- Franz Kronberger
- Pablo Laso
- Emir Mutapčić (interim)
- Svetislav Pešić
- Dejan Radonjić
- Andrea Trinchieri

== Honours ==
=== Domestic competitions ===
- German League

Winners (7): 1953–54, 1954–55, 2013–14, 2017–18, 2018–19, 2023–24, 2024–25
Runners-up (5): 1950–51, 2014–15, 2020–21, 2021–22, 2025–26

- German Cup

Winners (5): 1968, 2018, 2021, 2023, 2024
Runners-up (2): 2016, 2017

- German Supercup

Runners-up (1): 2014

- German 2nd League

Winners (2): 1986–87, 2010–11
Runners-up (2): 1982–83, 1983–1984

=== European competitions ===
- EuroLeague:

Quarterfinalist (2): 2020–21, 2021–22

- EuroCup

Semifinalist (1): 2017–18

=== Worldwide competitions ===
- NBA G League International Challenge

Winners (1): 2019

=== Other competitions ===
- Zadar Basketball Tournament

Runners-up (1): 2015

== Individual awards ==
BBL Most Valuable Player

- Malcolm Delaney – 2014

BBL Finals MVP

- Malcolm Delaney – 2014
- Danilo Barthel – 2018
- Nihad Đedović – 2019
- Carsen Edwards – 2024

German Cup MVP

- Vladimir Lučić – 2021
- Nick Weiler-Babb – 2023
- Sylvain Francisco – 2024

All-BBL First Team

- Malcolm Delaney – 2014
- John Bryant – 2015
- Bryce Taylor – 2016

All-BBL Second Team

- Chevon Troutman – 2012, 2013
- Tyrese Rice – 2013
- Bryce Taylor – 2014
- Deon Thompson – 2014
- Nihad Đedović – 2015
- Maxi Kleber – 2017
- Danilo Barthel – 2018, 2019
- Devin Booker – 2018
- Vladimir Lučić – 2019

BBL Best German Young Player

- Paul Zipser – 2016

BBL Best Defender

- Nick Weiler-Babb – 2025

BBL Most Effective Player

- Maxi Kleber – 2017

ProA Young Player of the Year

- Bastian Doreth – 2011

50 Greatest EuroLeague Contributors
Nominated:

- Svetislav Pešić

EuroLeague Basketball 2010–20 All-Decade Team
Nominated:

- James Gist

All-EuroLeague First Team

- Vladimir Lučić – 2020–21
- Carsen Edwards – 2024–25

All-EuroLeague Second Team

- Vladimir Lučić – 2021–22

EuroLeague Best Defender

- Nick Weiler-Babb – 2024–25

EuroLeague MVP of the Month

- Augustine Rubit – 2022–23, January

EuroLeague MVP of the Round

- Malcolm Delaney – 2013–14, Top 16, Week 10
- Duško Savanović – 2014–15, Regular Season, Week 9
- Derrick Williams – 2018–19, Regular Season, Round 12
- Vladimir Lučić – 2020–21, Regular Season, Round 3–4
- Vladimir Lučić – 2020–21, Regular Season, Round 8
- Wade Baldwin – 2020–21, Regular Season, Round 17
- Nick Weiler-Babb – 2020–21, Regular Season, Round 22–23
- Jalen Reynolds – 2020–21, Regular Season, Round 24
- Serge Ibaka – 2023–24, Regular Season, Round 11
- Shabazz Napier – 2024–25, Regular Season, Round 6
- Carsen Edwards – 2024–25, Regular Season, Round 23
- Carsen Edwards – 2024–25, Regular Season, Round 28

All-EuroCup First Team

- Devin Booker – 2017–18

All-EuroCup Second Team

- Maxi Kleber – 2016–17

EuroCup Basketball MVP of the Week

- Deon Thompson – 2015–16, Quarterfinals, Game 1
- Danilo Barthel – 2017–18, Regular Season, Round 8
- Devin Booker – 2017–18, Top 16, Round 3
- Danilo Barthel – 2017–18, Top 16, Round 5

NBA G League International Challenge Finals MVP

- Greg Monroe – 2019

== Season by season ==
Season	Tier	League	Pos.	German Cup	European competitions	
1966–67	1	BBL Süd	4th			
1967–68	1	BBL Süd	4th	Champion		
1968–69	1	BBL Süd	3rd		2 Cup Winners' Cup	2R
1969–70	1	BBL Süd	6th			
1970–71	1	BBL Süd	4th			
1971–72	1	BBL Süd	6th			
1972–73	1	BBL Süd	5th			
1973–74	1	BBL Süd	8th			
...
1982–83	2	2. BBL Süd	2nd			
1983–84	2	2. BBL Süd	2nd			
1984–85	2	2. BBL Süd	4th			
1985–86	2	2. BBL Süd	3rd			
1986–87	2	2. BBL Süd	1st			
1987–88	1	BBL	10th			
1988–89	1	BBL	11th			
1989–90	2	2. BBL Süd	5th			
1990–91	2	2. BBL Süd	5th			
1991–92	2	2. BBL Süd	6th			
1992–93	2	2. BBL Süd	11th			
...
1995–96	2	2. BBL Süd	12th			
...
1999–00	2	2. BBL Süd	12th			
...
2004–05	2	2. BBL Süd	15th			
...
2008–09	2	ProA	8th			
2009–10	2	ProA	8th			
2010–11	2	ProA	1st			
2011–12	1	BBL	5th		2 Eurocup	RS
2012–13	1	BBL	4th	Third position		
2013–14	1	BBL	1st	Fourth position	1 Euroleague	T16
2014–15	1	BBL	2nd	Quarterfinalist	1 Euroleague	RS
2014–15	1	BBL	2nd	Quarterfinalist	2 Eurocup	EF
2015–16	1	BBL	4th	Runner-up	1 Euroleague	RS
2015–16	1	BBL	4th	Runner-up	2 Eurocup	QF
2016–17	1	BBL	4th	Runner-up	2 EuroCup	QF
2017–18	1	BBL	1st	Champion	2 EuroCup	SF
2018–19	1	BBL	1st	Quarterfinalist	1 EuroLeague	11th
2019–20	1	BBL	5th	Round of 16	1 EuroLeague	—
2020–21	1	BBL	2nd	Champion	1 EuroLeague	QF
2021–22	1	BBL	2nd	Quarterfinalist	1 EuroLeague	QF
2022–23	1	BBL	3rd	Champion	1 EuroLeague	15th
2023–24	1	BBL	1st	Champion	1 EuroLeague	15th
2024–25	1	BBL	1st	Semifinalist	1 EuroLeague	P-I
2025–26	1	BBL	2nd	Semifinalist	1 EuroLeague	13th
2026–27	1	BBL			1 EuroLeague	

== International record ==
Season	Achievement	Notes
EuroLeague
2013–14	Top 16	6th place in a group with CSKA Moscow, Real Madrid, Maccabi Electra Tel Aviv, Galatasaray, Lokomotiv Kuban, Partizan and Žalgiris
2014–15	Regular season	5th place in a group with FC Barcelona, Fenerbahçe Ülker, Panathinaikos, EA7 Milano and PGE Turów
2015–16	Regular season	5th place in a group with Fenerbahçe, Khimki, Crvena zvezda Telekom, Real Madrid and Strasbourg
2020–21	Quarterfinals	eliminated 3–2 by A|X Armani Exchange Milan, 79-78 (L) & 80-69 (L) in Milan, 85-79 (W) & 85-82 (W) in Munich, 92-89 (L) in Milan
2021–22	Quarterfinals	eliminated 3–2 by Barcelona, 77-67 (L) & 75-90 (W) in Barcelona, 66-75 (L) & 59-52 (W) in Munich, 81-72 (L) in Barcelona
EuroCup
2011–12	Regular season	3rd place in a group with Spartak Saint Petersburg, Benetton Treviso and Cedevita
2014–15	Eighthfinals	eliminated by Valencia Basket, 80–58 (L) in Valencia and 60–94 (L) in Munich
2015–16	Quarterfinals	eliminated by Galatasaray Odeabank, 99–89 (W) in Munich and 72–59 (L) in Istanbul
2016–17	Quarterfinals	eliminated 2–1 by Unicaja, 91–82 (W) in Munich, 82–67 (L) in Málaga and 69–74 (L) in Munich
2017–18	Semifinals	eliminated 2–0 by Darüşşafaka, 76–74 (L) in Istanbul and 83–87 (L) in Munich
FIBA Saporta Cup
1968–69	Second round	eliminated by AŠK Olimpija, 81–101 (L) in Munich and 94–46 (L) in Ljubljana

== Sponsorships ==
Official Shirt Sponsor	Bernd Siegmund GmbH
Official Sport Clothing Manufacturer	Adidas AG

== Esports ==
Bayern Munich was featured in the NBA 2K15, 2K16 & 2K17 video games.

The official FC Bayern Basketball NBA 2K19 esports team "Bayern Ballers Gaming" was founded in April 2018. The Ballers quickly became one of the best virtual basketball teams in the world: together with their coach Swen Müller, the team continued to climb the NBA 2K ProAM world ranking, making them one of the Top 5 European teams.
