= Bamberg Baskets =

Professional basketball team in Bamberg, Germany

- Leagues: BBL; 2. DBBL; Champions League
- Founded: 1955; 71 years ago
- History: List: 1.FC 01 Bamberg (1955–1988) TTL Bamberg (1988–1995) TTL uniVersa Bamberg (1995–2000) TSK uniVersa Bamberg (2000–2003) GHP Bamberg (2003–2006) Brose Baskets (2006–2016) Brose Bamberg (2016–2023) Bamberg Baskets (2023–present)
- Arena: Brose Arena
- Capacity: 6,150
- Location: Bamberg, Germany
- Team colors: Red, grey, white
- Main sponsor: Brose Fahrzeugteile
- President: Norbert Sieben
- General manager: Philipp Galewski
- Head coach: Jesús Ramírez (Men); Samuel Gloser (Women)
- Team captain: Chris Sengfelder
- Affiliation: BBC Coburg
- Championships: 9 German Championships; 7 German Cups; 5 German Super Cups
- Retired numbers: 3 (5, 6, 23)
- Website: bamberg.basketball
Home	Away	Third

Bamberg Baskets, also known as BMA365 Bamberg Baskets in the BBL and Medikamente per Klick Bamberg Baskets in the 2. DBBL for sponsorship reasons, is a professional basketball club based in Bamberg, Germany. The club has won the German Championship title nine times and the German Cup seven times. The club currently plays in the German top tier Basketball Bundesliga (BBL), the 2. Damen-Basketball-Bundesliga (2. DBBL) and the Basketball Champions League. The license holder of the club is Bamberger Basketball GmbH.

The club was co-owned and sponsored by the German automotive supplier Brose Fahrzeugteile and was known as Brose Baskets and Brose Bamberg between 2006 and 2023.

== History ==
=== 1955–2003: first Bundesliga years ===
The 1. FC 01 Bamberg basketball team was promoted to the Basketball Bundesliga, the German Basketball League, for the first time in 1970. In 1988, after being relegated and promoted twice (relegations in 1979 and 1983, promotions in 1982 and 1984), and with 1. FC 01 Bamberg facing bankruptcy, the basketball division split to form a new club: TTL Basketball Bamberg. TTL stands for Tapeten-Teppichboden-Land, which is a wallpaper and carpet company. It was the first time the team name had reflected the name of its main sponsor. From 1995, the team was called TTL uniVersa Bamberg after uniVersa Versicherungen, an insurance company. In 1992, the team won the German Cup, earning Bamberg its first basketball trophy.

In 2000, following financial difficulties, the team was rescued by the TSK company and changed its name to TSK uniVersa Bamberg.

Differences of opinion between the main sponsor and the club in 2003 jeopardized the team's position in the Bundesliga and led to a new change of name.

=== 2003–2006: first championship ===
During the 2003–04 to 2005–06 seasons, the team played in the Bundesliga under the name of its new sponsor, as GHP Bamberg. Having come second in the Championship twice in a row, in 2004–05 the team brought the German Championship title home to Bamberg for the first time. This meant that GHP Bamberg qualified for the EuroLeague. In the following season (2005–06), the Bamberg team made it into the EuroLeague Top 16. It also played in the BBL Cup Final and in the semi-finals of the BBL playoffs.

=== 2006–2009: first years as Brose Baskets ===
At the start of the 2006–07 season, the club changed its name to Brose Baskets to reflect the fact that Brose Fahrzeugteile GmbH & Co. KG had become the new primary sponsor. It was in this season that the team won its second Championship title. In 2007–08, the team did not manage to consolidate the previous year's success and was knocked out in the first round of the EuroLeague, having won two games. In May 2008, Brose Baskets failed to defend their Championship title, losing to EWE Baskets Oldenburg in the quarter-finals. One week later, trainer Dirk Bauermann announced his resignation.

On 2 June 2008, Chris Fleming signed a three-year contract as head coach. He had previously coached the Artland Dragons, who played Brose Baskets in the finals in 2007. Fleming, an American, was 38 at the time. His long-term assistant coach, Arne Woltmann, also came with him from Quakenbrück.

The first year under the new trainer was difficult and the team only just qualified for the playoffs (top eight teams), with two points more than the team in ninth place. Nevertheless, they went on to beat the team in second place, MEG Göttingen, but did not stand a chance against the Oldenburg team, who eventually won the Championship. In the following year, the points round did not go very well, but the team still qualified for the playoffs in fifth place. In the cup competition they made it into the Top 4 final in Frankfurt, where they beat Skyliners, the home team, by one point, bringing the cup back to Bamberg after 18 years, for the second time in the club's history. In the Championship playoffs, Bonn and Braunschweig, who had previously knocked Oldenburg, the winners of the first round, out of the competition, did not pose many problems and Bamberg went through to the finals. There they once again faced Skyliners Frankfurt. Brose Baskets lost the first home game but immediately fought back to achieve a 2:1 lead. Frankfurt won the fourth game in their own arena, which was as close run as the cup final had been. Eventually, however, Brose Baskets won the Championship title with a 72:70 in front of its own fans, achieving its first double win.

=== 2010–2011: first treble ===
For the 2010–11 season, Brose Baskets managed to hold onto most of their players from the year before and made a few strategic additions. The well-rounded team went on to dominate the points round, losing only two out of 34 matches. The team also won the Cup competition, defending their title against Braunschweig in the final in Bamberg, where they won 69:66. In the Championship competition, Brose Baskets beat Eisbären Bremerhaven easily in the quarter-final. In the semi-final, they suffered two surprise defeats away against Artland Dragons, and only won in the fifth deciding game. In the final against Alba Berlin, Brose Baskets once again displayed some weaknesses in their away performance. The Berlin team dominated most of the deciding game in the Stechert Arena, despite a good start from Brose Baskets. Nevertheless, Brose Baskets were able to turn the game around in the final quarter, finishing with a clear 72:65 victory. This earned them the German Championship title for the fourth time and meant they had achieved two double wins in succession. In this season, the team also won all their home Cup and Championship matches.

=== 2011–2012: second treble ===
The Brose Baskets squad remained largely unchanged in the 2011–12 season, and departures were more than compensated for by strong additions. At the end of the main round, Bamberg was top of the table with 30 wins and four defeats. The team won the Cup again during this season. In the Championship competition, Brose Baskets managed to beat Telekom Baskets Bonn 3:1 in the playoff quarter-final, despite suffering a surprise defeat in the first home game. This was their first defeat at home in 49 games. In the semi-final, Brose Baskets beat Artland Dragons, winning three out of a possible five games (best-of-five), and also won the final against ratiopharm Ulm 3:0. This was Brose Baskets’ third successive double win. Partly because of this success, several players signed bigger contracts with other teams at the end of the season, which meant it was not possible to keep the same squad intact the following season. Tibor Pleiß and Marcus Slaughter transferred to Spain, Brian Roberts and P. J. Tucker switched to the NBA, and Predrag Šuput moved to KK Cedevita in Croatia.

=== 2012–2013: sixth German championship ===
As in the previous season, it was possible to keep the core team together in 2012–13, but injuries during the season led to a number of changes, which weakened the team. Nevertheless, Brose Baskets finished the main round of the Beko BBL at the top of the table with 26 wins. In contrast with previous years, the team failed to get through the qualifying round of the Cup competition, losing 69:77 at home to FC Bayern München. In the Championship competition, Brose Baskets faced Phoenix Hagen, beating them 3:1 and making it through to the semi-final of the playoffs. Here they came up against FC Bayern München, who they managed to beat 3:2 after five games. This meant they were through to the final for the fourth time in a row. Here the champions of the previous three years faced EWE Baskets Oldenburg. Brose Baskets won 3:0 in three straight games, securing the Championship title for the fourth time in a row.

=== 2013–2014: disappointing season ===
In the regular season Brose Baskets could not defend its top seed position from the three previous years finishing second behind Bayern Munich and thus facing the 7th seeded Artland Dragons in the playoff quarterfinals. The Dragons pulled off an upset and beat Brose with 3–1. The team also failed to reach the BBL-Pokal Final and did not accomplish much in its European campaign. After the season the club parted ways with head coach Chris Fleming. Long time great players of the club John Goldsberry and Casey Jacobsen put an end to their careers, and had their jersey numbers retired by the club.

=== 2014–2015: back on top ===
In the 2014–15 season, Brose Baskets came back on top of the German basketball world, after they beat the defending champions Bayern Munich 3–2 in the Finals. Bamberg also finished the regular season in the first place. Bamberg's Bradley Wanamaker was named Basketball Bundesliga Finals MVP.

=== 2015–16: eighth German championship ===
In the 2015–16 season, Brose Baskets had an impressive EuroLeague campaign, in which the team survived the Regular Season and advanced to the Top 16. In the Bundesliga, Brose had an even more impressive season. The team finished first in the regular season by a wide margin, and eventually won the championship after sweeping all opponents in the playoffs.

In August 2016, the Brose Baskets changed the name to Brose Bamberg.

=== 2016–17: EuroLeague and more domination in Germany ===
Through its championship in the 2015–16 season, Bamberg qualified for the 2016–17 EuroLeague, the first true European basketball league. Bamberg finished in the 10th place, with All-EuroLeague Second Team member Nicolò Melli leading the team.

In Germany, the team once again dominated. The BBL-Pokal was won after beating Bayern Munich in the Final. The ninth Basketball Bundesliga title of the club was won after sweeping EWE Baskets Oldenburg 3–0 in the BBL Finals.

=== 2017–18: Last season in the EuroLeague ===
In the 2017–2018 season, Brose finished 12th in the EuroLeague. In the Basketball Bundesliga, Brose's domination ended at the hands of Bayern Munich, who beat Brose 3–1 in the semifinals. Brose also lost to Bayern in the BBL-Pokal quarterfinals. The 4th-place finish in the Bundesliga was the worst for Brose in years.

=== 2018: Participation in FIBA tournaments ===
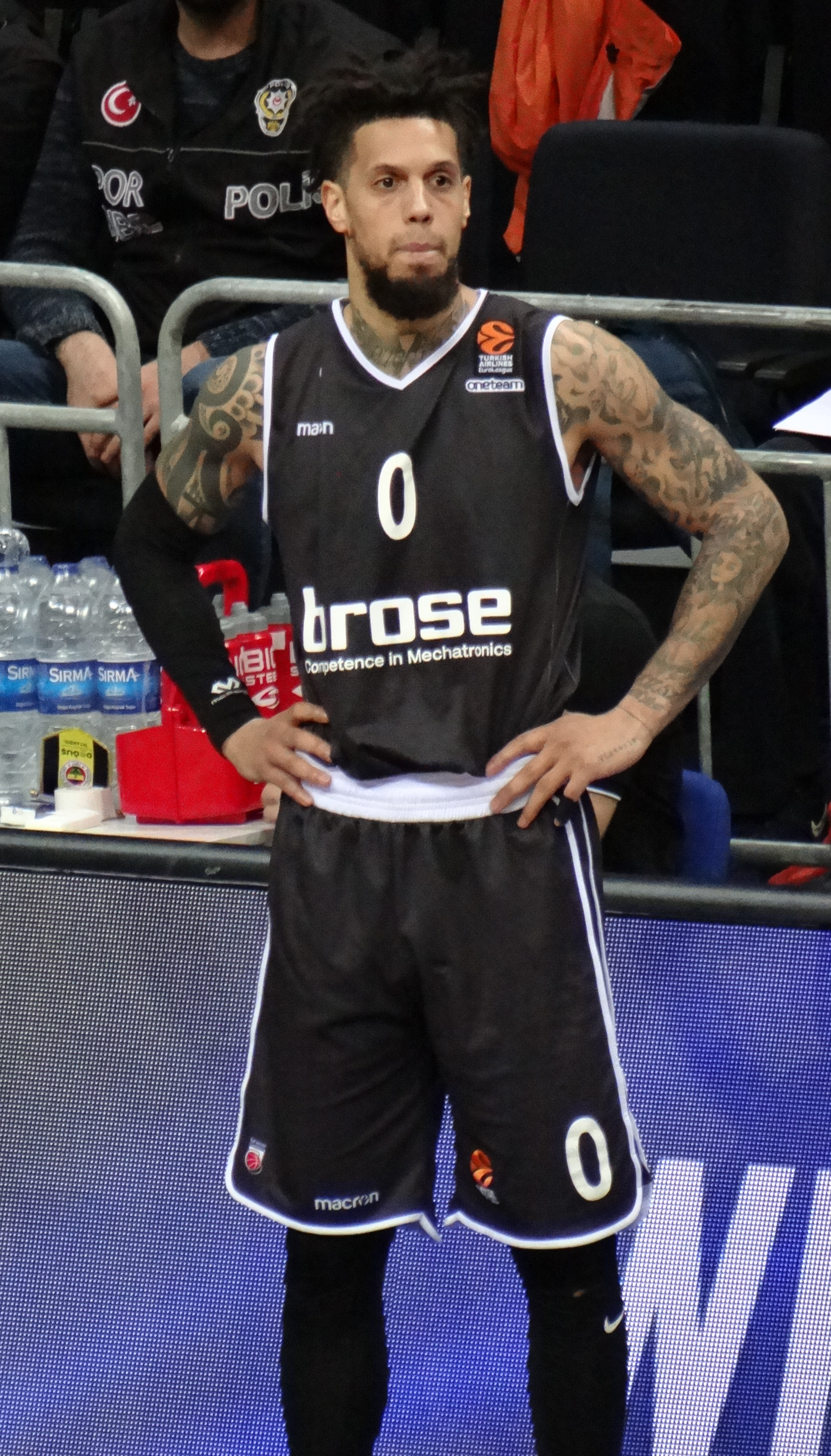
Daniel Hackett with Bamberg, in 2018.

=== 2019–2020 ===
On 17 February 2019, Bamberg won its fifth BBL-Pokal after defeating Alba Berlin 83–82 in the final. In the 2018–19 season, Bamberg also made its debut in the Basketball Champions League. After playing in EuroLeague Basketball competitions since 2004, this was the first time the club participated in a FIBA-organised competition. In the quarter-finals, Bamberg narrowly beat defending champions AEK Athens to qualify for the 2019 Final Four.

On 1 July 2020, Johan Roijakkers signed a 3-year contract as Bamberg's new head coach. With Johan Roijakkers as their head coach Brose Bamberg did not lose a single home game during the 2020–2021 season in the Basketball Champions League. Brose Bamberg also set the record for most made 3s in a single game (21 made 3s on 58% vs Casademont Zaragoza, 23 March 2021, 117 – 76).

=== 2021 ===
In November 2021, Brose Bamberg announced that Oren Amiel had signed as their head coach. With Oren Amiel as their head coach they did not qualify for the Basketball Champions League in the 2022–2023 season. The team continued their European season in the FIBA Europe Cup.

=== 2023 ===
In June 2023, the club announced that Brose was selling its shares in the company and also released its naming rights. As a result, the name of the club was changed to Bamberg Baskets on 1 July 2023.

=== 2024–2025 ===
In the 2024–2025 season the team participated for the first time in the European league ENBL.

=== 2025 ===
In June 2025, the club announced that starting with the 2025–2026 season they will have a new name sponsor and the team name will change to BMA365 Bamberg Baskets.

== Club logos ==
GHP Bamberg era logo, 2003–2006.

Brose Baskets logo, 2006–2016.

== Honors ==
=== Domestic competitions ===
- German League championship
  - Winners: 2004–05, 2006–07, 2009–10, 2010–11, 2011–12, 2012–13, 2014–15, 2015–16, 2016–17
  - Runners-up: 1992–93, 2002–03, 2003–04
- German Cup
  - Winners: 1992, 2010, 2011, 2012, 2017, 2019, 2026
  - Runners-up: 1990, 2006, 2015, 2025
- German Super Cup:
  - Winners: 2007, 2010, 2011, 2012, 2015
  - Runners-up: 2013
- 2. Basketball Bundesliga
  - Champions: 1983–84

=== European competitions ===
- Basketball Champions League
  - Fourth place: 2018–19

=== Other Competitions ===
- Zwolle, Netherlands Invitational Game
  - Winners: 2015
- Bamberg, Germany Invitational Game
  - Winners: 2016, 2017
- Bayreuth Tournament
  - Winners: 2016
- Gmunden, Austria Invitational Game
  - Winners: 2016

== Team venues ==
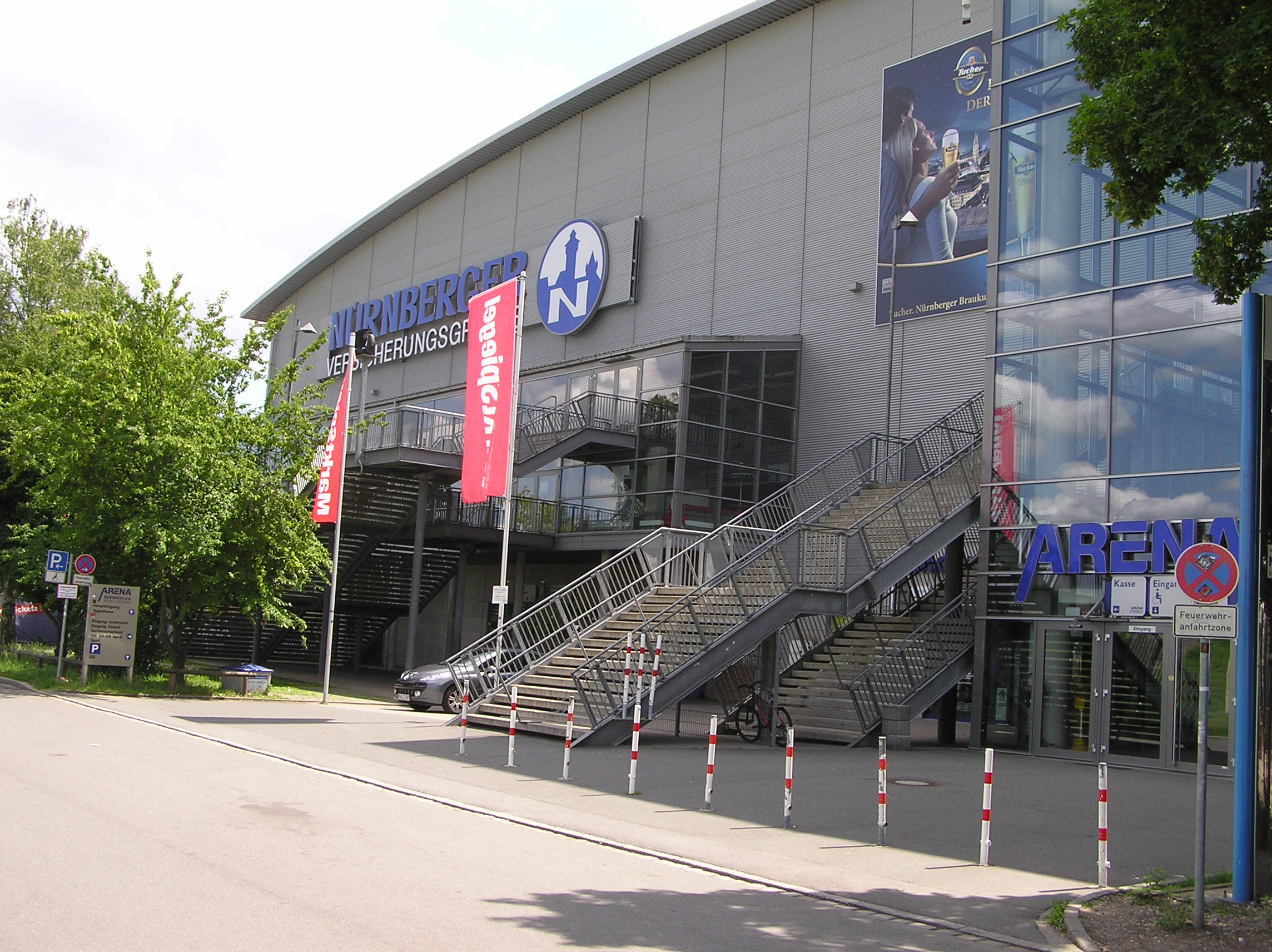
Nuremberg Arena, which has been used as home arena of the club.

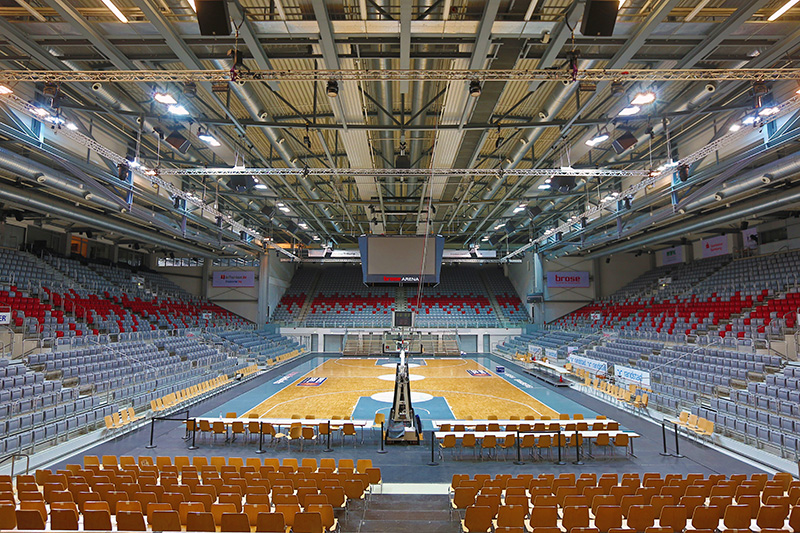
Brose Arena, which has been the regular home arena of the club, since 2001.

Since 2001, Brose Bamberg has played its home games at Brose Arena, a venue that has undergone a number of name changes since it was built.

Following alterations to the building in 2006, it could hold up to 6,820, after originally having a seating capacity of 4,750 spectators for basketball games. In 2006, a large corporate zone and new corporate luxury boxes were also added to the arena. Thanks to the 2006 expansion, the arena also became big enough for Turkish Airlines EuroLeague games (EuroLeague minimum capacity arena rules – 5,000 seats). In 2016, the arena removed the fan's standing room section, in order to meet minimum EuroLeague arena regulations (no standing room only areas are allowed in EuroLeague arenas), which reduced the arena's seating capacity to 6,150. Before brose ARENA met EuroLeague capacity requirements, European-wide home games of Brose had to take place at the 8,200 seat Arena Nürnberger Versicherung, which is located in Nuremberg, which is about 63 km (39 miles) in driving distance from Brose's home city of Bamberg.

Before Brose Arena (previously called Forum Bamberg, Jako Arena, and Stechert Arena) was built, the team played at the John F. Kennedy Hall, on the U.S. barracks site (Ausländische Militärbasen), in Bamberg, and later at the Graf Stauffenberg Hall.

Bamberg fans are known for noisy support with drums, chants and a brass band, providing atmosphere at the arena, nicknamed "Frankenhölle".

== Players ==
=== Retired numbers ===
Brose Bamberg retired numbers
No	Nat.	Player	Position	Tenure	Date retired	Ref
5	(United States)	John Goldsberry	PG	2008–2014	21 May 2014	
6	(Greece)	Nikos Zisis	PG	2015–2019	7 September 2019	
23	(United States)	Casey Jacobsen	SF	2006–2007, 2009–2014	21 May 2014	

=== Current roster ===
Note: Flags indicate national team eligibility at FIBA-sanctioned events. Players may hold other non-FIBA nationalities not displayed.

Brose Bamberg roster
Players
Coaches

Pos.	No.	Nat.	Name	Ht.	Wt.	Age
F/C	1	(Germany)	Bähre, Jonathan	2.08 m (6 ft 10 in)	95 kg (209 lb)	30 – 12 September 1996
SG	3	(United States)	Wright, Jordan	1.98 m (6 ft 6 in)	104 kg (229 lb)	26 – 21 September 2000
G	4	(United States)	Jones, Jordan	1.83 m (6 ft 0 in)	82 kg (181 lb)	24 – 2 March 2002
PF	7	(Germany) (Czech Republic)	Koppke, Benjamin	2.05 m (6 ft 9 in)	96 kg (212 lb)	21 – 11 July 2005
G/F	8	(United States)	Demonia, Demarcus	2.00 m (6 ft 7 in)	88 kg (194 lb)	27 – 12 August 1999
G	10	(United States)	Wilson, Mylik	1.91 m (6 ft 3 in)	79 kg (174 lb)	26 – 20 September 2000
G	11	(Czech Republic)	Bálint, Richard	1.92 m (6 ft 4 in)	96 kg (212 lb)	24 – 8 November 2002
F	13	(United States)	Scott, Trevon	2.03 m (6 ft 8 in)	86 kg (190 lb)	29 – 25 November 1996
F	15	(United States) (Germany)	Terry, Brendan	2.01 m (6 ft 7 in)	100 kg (220 lb)	23 – 15 April 2003
PF	20	(Rwanda) (Barbados)	Ward, Hason	2.06 m (6 ft 9 in)	92 kg (203 lb)	26 – 24 September 2000
PF	22	(Germany)	Lang, Jakob	2.01 m (6 ft 7 in)	94 kg (207 lb)	21 – 13 February 2005
G/F	31	(Germany)	Keppeler, Daniel	1.98 m (6 ft 6 in)	96 kg (212 lb)	29 – 18 January 1997
F	66	(Israel)	Hochstadter, Yuval	1.98 m (6 ft 6 in)	94 kg (207 lb)	22 – 7 October 2004
SF	77	(Germany)	Obiesie, Joshua	1.98 m (6 ft 6 in)	86 kg (190 lb)	26 – 23 May 2000

Head coach

- (Spain) Jesús Ramírez

Assistant coach(es)

- (Germany) Lars Masell

Legend

- (C) Team captain
- Injured

- Roster
Updated: October 17, 2026

== Season by season ==
Season	Tier	League	Pos.	German Cup	European competitions		
1991–92	1	Bundesliga	2nd	Champion			
1992–93	1	Bundesliga	2nd				
1993–94	1	Bundesliga	1st	Semi-finalist			
1994–95	1	Bundesliga	1st		3	FIBA Korać Cup	R1
1995–96	1	Bundesliga	4th	Semi-finalist	3	FIBA Korać Cup	R1
1996–97	1	Bundesliga	3rd	Semi-finalist	3	FIBA Korać Cup	R1
1997–98	1	Bundesliga	3rd		3	FIBA Korać Cup	R3
1998–99	1	Bundesliga	6th	Third place	3	FIBA Korać Cup	R1
1999–00	1	Bundesliga	10th				
2000–01	1	Bundesliga	10th				
2001–02	1	Bundesliga	7th				
2002–03	1	Bundesliga	2nd				
2003–04	1	Bundesliga	2nd		3	FIBA Europe League	EF
2004–05	1	Bundesliga	1st		2	ULEB Cup	RS
2005–06	1	Bundesliga	3rd	Finalist	1	Euroleague	T16
2006–07	1	Bundesliga	1st		2	ULEB Cup	RS
2007–08	1	Bundesliga	7th		1	Euroleague	RS
2008–09	1	Bundesliga	4th		2	Eurocup	RS
2009–10	1	Bundesliga	1st	Champion	2	Eurocup	T16
2010–11	1	Bundesliga	1st	Champion	1	Euroleague	RS
2011–12	1	Bundesliga	1st	Champion	1	Euroleague	RS
2012–13	1	Bundesliga	1st	Quarter-finalist	1	Euroleague	T16
2013–14	1	Bundesliga	5th	Third place	1	Euroleague	RS
2013–14	1	Bundesliga	5th	Third place	2	Eurocup	L32
2014–15	1	Bundesliga	1st	Finalist	2	Eurocup	EF
2015–16	1	Bundesliga	1st	Semi-finalist	1	Euroleague	T16
2016–17	1	Bundesliga	1st	Champion	1	EuroLeague	13th
2017–18	1	Bundesliga	4th	Quarter-finalist	1	EuroLeague	12th
2018–19	1	Bundesliga	5th	Champion	Champions League	4th	
2019–20	1	Bundesliga	6th	Semifinals	Champions League	RS	
2020–21	1	Bundesliga	8th	Group stage	Champions League	PO	
2021–22	1	Bundesliga	8th	Round of 16	Champions League	Q	
2022–23	1	Bundesliga	11th	Round of 16	Champions League	Q	
2022–23	1	Bundesliga	11th	Round of 16	Europe Cup	QF	
2023–24	1	Bundesliga	11th	Semifinals			
2024–25	1	Bundesliga	15th	Finalist	R	ENBL	QF
2025–26	1	Bundesliga	3rd	Champion			
2026–27	1	Bundesliga			Champions League		

== Notable players ==
Note: Flags indicate national team eligibility at FIBA-sanctioned events. Players may hold other non-FIBA nationalities not displayed.

Criteria

To appear in this section a player must have either:

- Set a club record or won an individual award while at the club
- Played at least one official international match for their national team at any time
- Played at least one official NBA match at any time.

- (Germany) Daniel Theis
- (Germany) Maik Zirbes
- (Germany) Tibor Pleiß
- (Germany) Steffen Hamann
- (Germany) (Nigeria) Ademola Okulaja
- (Germany) Robert Garrett
- (Germany) Tim Ohlbrecht
- (Germany) Sven Schultze
- (Germany) Holger Geschwindner
- (Finland) Pekka Markkanen
- (Serbia) Ljubodrag Simonović
- (Latvia) Uvis Helmanis
- (Estonia) Henri Drell
- (Estonia) Gert Kullamäe
- (Serbia) Predrag Šuput
- (Slovakia) (Germany) Anton Gavel
- (Slovenia) Boštjan Nachbar
- (Latvia) Jānis Strēlnieks
- (France) Fabien Causeur
- (Greece) Nikos Zisis
- (Italy) (United States) Nicolò Melli
- (Italy) (United States) Daniel Hackett
- (United States) Elton Brown
- (United States) (Poland) Dan Dickau
- (United States) Chris Ensminger
- (United States) (Israel) D'or Fischer
- (United States) Sharrod Ford
- (United States) John Goldsberry
- (United States) (Georgia (country)) Ricky Hickman
- (United States) Kyle Hines
- (United States) Casey Jacobsen
- (United States) Julius Jenkins
- (United States) Paris Lee
- (United States) Demond Mallet
- (United States) Darius Miller
- (United States) Walter Palmer
- (United States) Brian Roberts
- (United States) P. J. Tucker
- (United States) Marcus Slaughter
- (United States) (Bosnia and Herzegovina) Alex Renfroe
- (United States) Jason Sasser
- (United States) Eldridge Recasner
- (United States) Dickey Simpkins
- (United States) Brad Wanamaker
- (United States) K'zell Wesson
- (United States) Dorell Wright

== Head coaches ==
1988–1994	(Germany) Terence Schofield
1994–1999	(United States) Ken Scalabroni
1999–2001	(Germany) Armin Andres
2001	(Serbia) Zoran Slavnić
2001–2008	(Germany) Dirk Bauermann
2008–2014	(United States) Chris Fleming
2014–2018	(Italy) Andrea Trinchieri
2018	(Greece) Ilias Kantzouris (interim head coach)
2018	(Italy) Luca Banchi
2018–2019	(Latvia) Ainars Bagatskis
2019	(Italy) Federico Perego
2019–2020	(Belgium) Roel Moors
2020–2021	(Netherlands) Johan Roijakkers
2021–2024	(Israel) Oren Amiel
2024–2026	(Germany) (Slovakia) Anton Gavel
2026–present	(Spain) Jesús Ramírez

== Other important club personalities ==
- Norbert Sieben (President)
- Michael Stoschek (chairman of the supervisory board); other supervisory board members: Carl Steiner, Maximilian Stoschek

== Partnerships and youth development work ==
Brose Baskets and their registered association run junior Under-9, Under-10, Under-12, Under-14, Under-16, and Under-19 teams, and collaborate with Baunach, a team in the German third-tier level Bundesliga (ProB). Since the 2009–10 season, there is also a women's Under-17 WNBL professional team: Team Oberfranken. And another women's team, DJK Brose Bamberg, has been playing in the 1st German Bundesliga, with support from Brose Baskets, since 2012.

Partner teams:

- Bike-Cafe Messingschlager Baunach (ProB)
- TSV Tröster Breitengüßbach (South-East Regional League, NBBL, JBBL)
- Brose Baskets e. V. (WNBL)
- Regnitztal Baskets (2nd Regional League)
- TTL Bamberg (2nd Regional League, Under-14 professional team)
- DJK Don Bosco Bamberg (Under-13 professional team)
- BG Litzendorf
- SpVgg Roth
- SG Köln99ers e.V.
- Paderborn Baskets

Brose Baskets also work with a large number of other clubs, in the Under-12 to Under-19 range, as part of the Junior Franken project.

In addition, many of the players from Bamberg's youth program have been in the squads for the senior German national team and the German junior national teams. The senior German national men's A squad has included Brose players Karsten Tadda and Maik Zirbes. Bamberg has also had numerous players in the German Under-20, German Under-18, and German Under-16 squads, such as: Johannes Thiemann, Alexander Engel, Alina Hartmann, Dino Dizdarevic, Andreas Obst, Robert Zinn, Daniel Keppeler, Noah Kamdem, Leon Kratzer, Saskia Beringer, and Anne-Katrin Landwehr.

As well as running professional sports activities, Brose Baskets and their partner clubs, reach around 12,000 children and young people each year, through numerous leisure sports projects. These include: AG Grundschule (a primary school program), basketball promotion days, a school's league, basketball camps, and the Kinder+Sport Basketball Academy.

On 1 October 2013, Förderverein Basketball Bamberg e. V., was renamed Brose Baskets e.V. The aim of the association, is to support youth development work in the area of basketball. As of February 2014, it had around 300 members.

== Supporters ==
The club's broad fan support base within, a relatively small town of Bamberg (with around 76,000 inhabitants), has led to the town receiving the nickname, "Freak City", in basketball circles. The team's fan club, Faszination Basketball Bamberg, has nearly 1,000 members, making it the biggest basketball fan club in the German Beko BBL. Brose Baskets also receives organized support from fan clubs Freak City Frankenpower and Sektion Südblock, among others.
