= BBL Champions Cup =

German basketball competition

Basketball Bundesliga Champions Cup
- Current season, competition or edition: 2015 BBL Champions Cup
- Sport: Basketball
- Founded: 2006
- No. of teams: 2
- Country: Germany
- Continent: Europe
- Most recent champions: Brose Bamberg (2015)
- Most titles: Brose Bamberg (5 titles)
- Related competitions: Basketball Bundesliga; BBL-Pokal
- Website: Website

The Basketball Bundesliga (BBL) Champions Cup is an inactive men's professional basketball game in Germany, which is comparable to other super cup games. The Basketball Bundesliga champion plays the game against the BBL-Pokal winner. Usually, the game is played in the arena of the German League champion, but there are no fixed rules. When the same team wins both the Bundesliga and Pokal, then the Pokal runner-up will participate in the game.

== Matches ==
Key
Champions Cup winner

Year	Basketball Bundesliga winners	Score	BBL-Pokal winners	Venue	Ref.
2006	Köln 99ers	75–74	Alba Berlin	Max-Schmeling-Halle, Berlin	
2007	Bamberg	70–51	Köln 99ers	Arena Ludwigsburg, Ludwigsburg	
2008	Alba Berlin	84–69	Artland Dragons	Artland-Arena, Quakenbrück	
2009	Oldenburg	69–54	Bonn	EWE Arena, Oldenburg	
2010	Bamberg	85–58	Skyliners Frankfurt (Note: Qualified as BBL-Pokal runner-up, because a team won both the Bundesliga and Pokal.)	JAKO-Arena, Bamberg	
2011	Bamberg	86–66	Phantoms Braunschweig	Brose Arena, Bamberg (2)	
2012	Bamberg	102–98	Ulm	Brose Arena, Bamberg (3)	
2013	Brose Baskets	78–79	Alba Berlin	O2 World, Berlin (2)	
2014	Bayern Munich	68–76	Alba Berlin	O2 World, Berlin (3)	
2015	Bamberg	87–66	Oldenburg	Brose Arena, Bamberg (4)	
2016	The match was not played, due to the busy BBL schedule				
2017	Due to EuroBasket 2017 taking place, the match was not played.				

== Performances by club ==
Teams shown in italics are no longer in existence.

Club	Wins	Losses	Seasons won
Bamberg	5	1	2007, 2010, 2011, 2012, 2015
Alba Berlin	3	1	2008, 2013, 2014
Köln 99ers	1	1	2006
Oldenburg	1	1	2009
Ulm	–	1	
Löwen Braunschweig	–	1	
Skyliners Frankfurt	–	1	
Bonn	–	1	
Artland Dragons	–	1	
Bayern Munich	–	1	

== See also ==
- Basketball Bundesliga Awards
- Basketball Bundesliga Cup
- BBL All-Star Game
- German champions (basketball)
