= Brose Arena =

Multi-purpose hall in Bamberg, Germany

Coordinates: 49°52′45″N 10°55′14″E

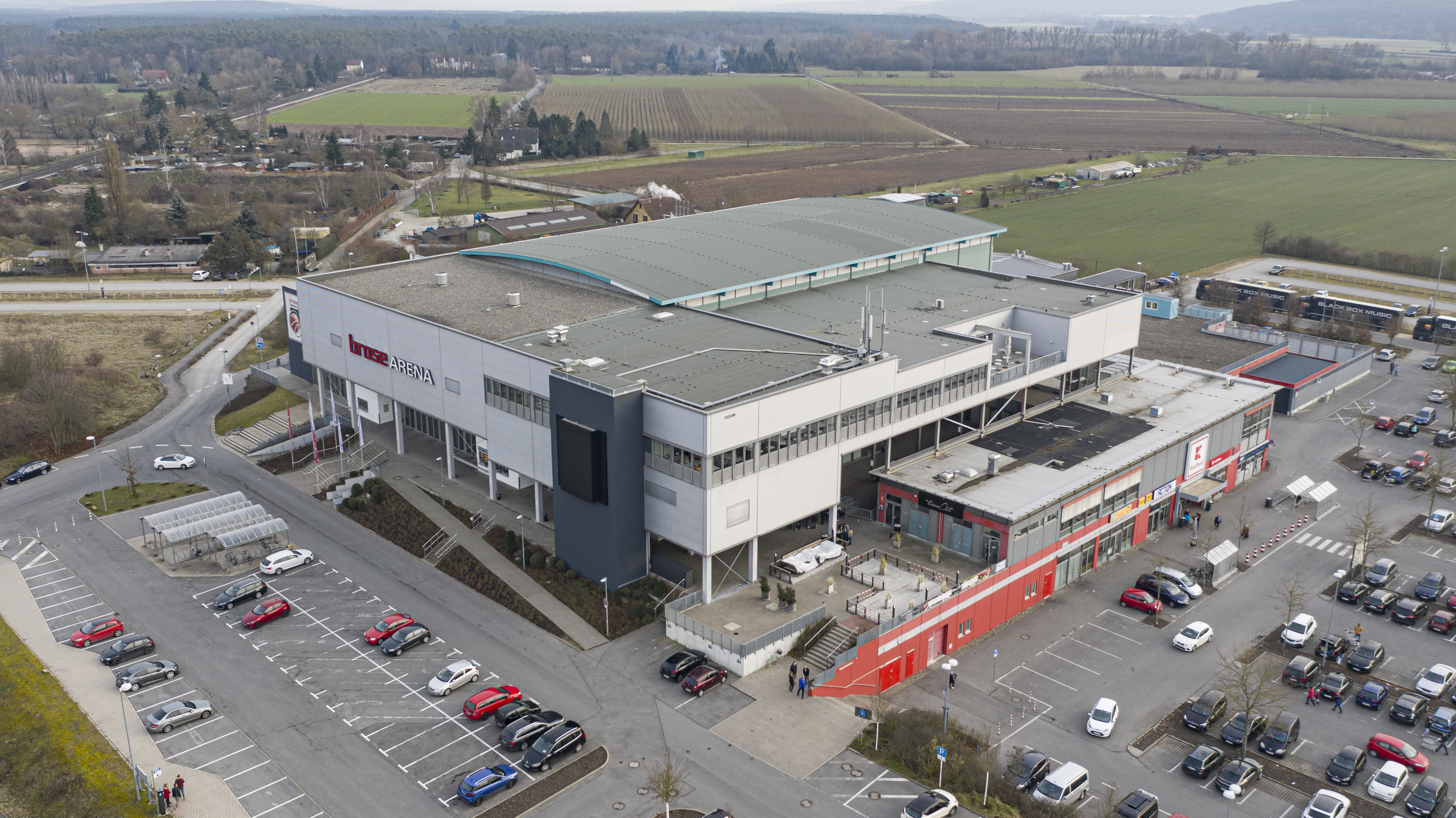
- Interactive map of Brose Arena
- Former names: Forum (2001–2006); Jako Arena (2006–2010); Stechert Arena (2010–2013)
- Location: Bamberg, Bayern
- Owner: Stadt Bamberg (Stadtwerke Bamberg, Stadtbau GmbH Bamberg)
- Operator: BAB Bamberg Arena Betriebsgesellschaft mbH
- Capacity: 10,000 (maximum, includes Loge/Lounges); 8,000 (concerts); 6,150 (basketball seats in the court area)

Construction
- Built: 2000
- Opened: 2001
- Renovated: 2006, 2013
- Expanded: 2006

Tenant
- Bamberg Baskets (BBL) (2001–present)

Website
- brosebamberg.de

Brose Arena (official spelling: brose ARENA) is the fourth largest multi-functional indoor arena in Bavaria, after the Olympic Hall and the SAP Garden in Munich and the Arena Nürnberger Versicherung in Nuremberg.

== History ==
The rights relating to the name of the arena, built in 2001, and previously known as Forum Bamberg, were sold to JAKO (a manufacturer of team sports clothing) in March 2006. In connection with this process, building work was carried out to expand the capacity from 4,750 seats for basketball games (6,850 for concerts) to 6,820 for basketball with standing room (nearly 8,000 for concerts). The structural alteration work, which cost six million euros, brought the foyer forward by 20 meters, to make room for a new north stand. It also created nine VIP boxes on the west side, and an adjoining corporate zone. This has an area of over 600 square metres, and can hold up to 700 people. Beneath the complex, there is a shopping center, with a big supermarket and several shops and restaurants.

From October 1, 2010 to September 30, 2013, the arena was named after Stechert, the tubular furniture manufacturer. Since October 1, 2013, it has been called Brose ARENA, after automotive supplier Brose. In conjunction with the change of name, the town of Bamberg carried out major maintenance and building works, worth around 2.5 million euros. The acoustics inside the arena were improved by expanding the existing loud speaker system, and installing sound-absorbing wall cladding. Then the video technology was modernized, by purchasing a video cube with the latest LED technology, and updating the networks throughout the building. The new seating stands and modernization of the corporate zone, made a big difference to the appearance of Brose ARENA.

In December 2016, the 720 capacity standing room of the arena was replaced, in order to meet the EuroLeague's standards and regulations for arenas, bringing the arena's seating capacity 6,150 regular fan seats around the basketball court, and 6,249 for basketball with VIP seats.

== Events ==
Brose Arena, located in Bamberg, is the home stadium of Brose Bamberg, a professional basketball team in the Bundesliga (Germany’s top-tier level national domestic basketball league) that also regularly competes in the EuroLeague and EuroCup. In the 2009–10 season, the arena was also home to the volleyball Bundesliga team VC Franken.

In addition, Brose Arena is used as a venue for numerous concerts and trade fairs, as well as entertainment and corporate events. In 2008, it was the chosen venue for two IBF World Championship boxing matches, and the Davis Cup tennis match between Germany and Argentina. The University of Bamberg regularly uses the arena for end-of-term exams, because of its large capacity. In 2013, Brose Arena welcomed performers Seeed, Sportfreunde Stiller, Bülent Ceylan, Cindy aus Marzahn, and Michael Mittermeier. Over 150 events are held at the arena each year, attended by a total of around 400,000 people.

== Gallery ==
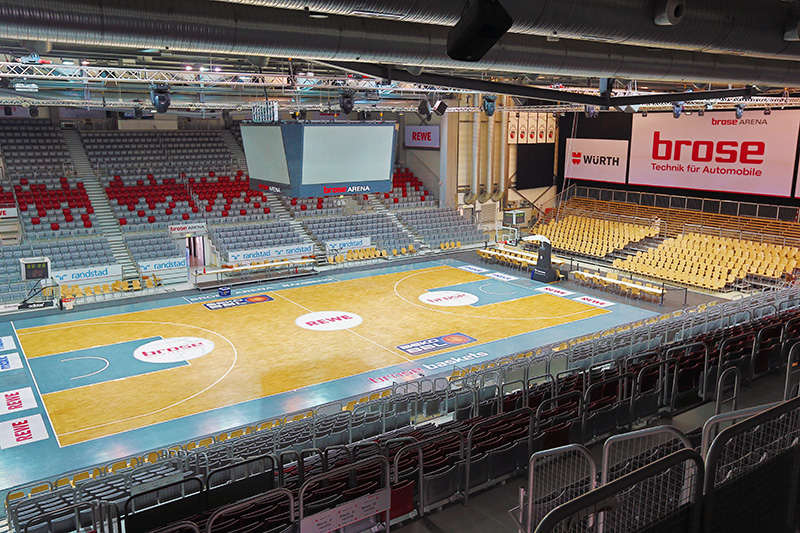

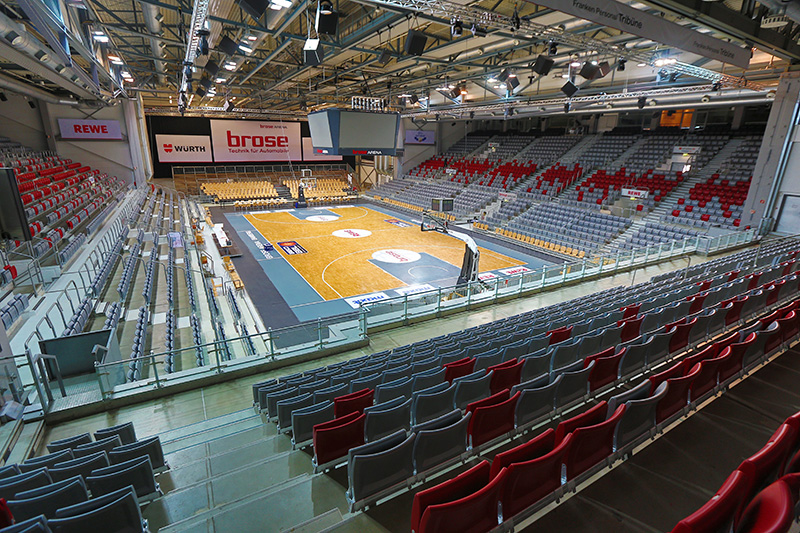

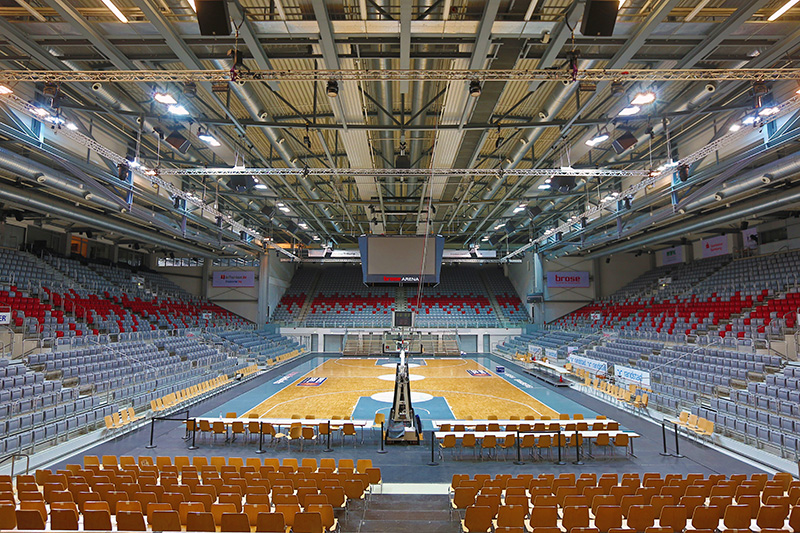
