= 2020–21 Donar (basketball club) season =

Donar
2020–21 season
- Chairman: Jannes Stokroos
- Head coach: Ivan Rudež (August 2020–April 2021); Pete Miller (April 2021–present)
- Arena: MartiniPlaza
- Dutch Basketball League: Semifinalists (lost to Heroes Den Bosch)
- DBL Cup: Quarterfinalist (lost to Yoast United)
- FIBA Europe Cup: Regular season

The 2020–21 Donar season was the 49th season in the existence of the club. The club will play in the Dutch Basketball League (DBL) and Basketball Cup. It was the first season under head coach Ivan Rudež who was fired in April 2021 after disappointing results. He was replaced by Pete Miller. The season ended in more disappointment for Donar, as the team was eliminated early in the 2021 DBL Cup by Yoast United, and later in the playoffs semifinals by Heroes Den Bosch. This season was the first time since 2013 that Donar did not play in the DBL Finals.

== Summary ==
The 2019–20 season was abandoned early in March because of the COVID-19 pandemic. Donar had qualified for the Cup Final and was second in the DBL standings at the time. The DBL announced that the final against Aris Leeuwarden will be played later in the year 2020.

On 14 April 2020, Donar announced head coach Erik Braal's contract would not be extended in mutual consent. Braal won the most trophies in club history, with seven in total. On 17 April 2020, Ivan Rudež signed a three-year contract with Donar in the Netherlands.

== Players ==
=== Squad information ===
Donar roster
Players
Coaches

Pos.	No.	Nat.	Name	Ht.	Wt.	Age
F	1	(Netherlands)	Agasi, Nesta	2.00 m (6 ft 7 in)		26 – 29 July 2000
PG	3	(Canada)	Ogungbemi-Jackson, Jarred	1.78 m (5 ft 10 in)	95 kg (209 lb)	35 – 11 August 1991
PG	5	(Netherlands)	Williams, Leon	1.89 m (6 ft 2 in)	75 kg (165 lb)	35 – 25 July 1991
G	6	(Netherlands)	Adetunji, Sheyi	1.87 m (6 ft 2 in)		27 – 11 September 1999
SG	7	(United States)	Lacy, DaVonté	1.91 m (6 ft 3 in)	93 kg (205 lb)	33 – 21 March 1993
F	9	(Croatia)	Rudež, Damjan	2.08 m (6 ft 10 in)	103 kg (227 lb)	40 – 17 June 1986
C	14	(Netherlands)	Koenis, Thomas (C)	2.10 m (6 ft 11 in)	103 kg (227 lb)	36 – 11 December 1989
PF/C	19	(Netherlands)	Brandwijk, Willem	2.06 m (6 ft 9 in)	100 kg (220 lb)	31 – 31 July 1995
G/F	21	(United States)	Caruso, Henry	1.93 m (6 ft 4 in)	95 kg (209 lb)	31 – 1 July 1995
SG	22	(United States)	Moreton, Will	1.98 m (6 ft 6 in)	88 kg (194 lb)	28 – 5 December 1997
G/F	24	(United States)	Watts, Justin	1.96 m (6 ft 5 in)	95 kg (209 lb)	36 – 1 July 1990
F	32	(Netherlands)	Zuidema, Kjeld	1.95 m (6 ft 5 in)		25 – 21 June 2001
C	33	(United States)	James, Juwann	1.98 m (6 ft 6 in)	102 kg (225 lb)	39 – 10 February 1987

Head coach

(United States) Pete Miller

Assistant coach(es)

(Netherlands) Jan Stalman

Legend

- (C) Team captain
- (DP) Development player
- (I) Import player
- Injured

- Roster
Updated: 11 January 2021

Note: Flags indicate national team eligibility at FIBA-sanctioned events. Players may hold other non-FIBA nationalities not displayed.

=== Depth chart ===
Pos.	Starting 5	Bench 1	Bench 2
C	Thomas Koenis	Juwann James
PF	Damjan Rudež	Willem Brandwijk	Nesta Agasi
SF	Henry Caruso	Will Moreton	Kjeld Zuidema
SG	DaVonté Lacy	Justin Watts
PG	Jarred Ogungbemi-Jackson	Leon Williams	Sheyi Adetunji

=== Transactions ===
==== In ====
No.	Pos.	Nat.	Name	Age	Moving from		Type	Ends	Date	Source
1	F	(Netherlands)	Nesta Agasi	19	Donar U21	(Netherlands)	Free	2021	22 June 2020	
3	PG	(Canada)	Jarred Ogungbemi-Jackson	28	Kataja	(Finland)	Free	2021	5 May 2020	
7	SF	(United States)	DaVonté Lacy	27	USC Heidelberg	(Germany)	Free	2021	2 May 2020	
19	PF	(Netherlands)	Willem Brandwijk	24	Feyenoord	(Netherlands)	Free	2022	7 July 2020	
22	G/F	(United States)	Will Moreton	22	Stonehill Skyhawks	(United States)	Free	2021	22 June 2020	
32	F	(Netherlands)	Kjeld Zuidema	18	Donar U21	(Netherlands)	Free	2021	19 June 2020	
24	G/F	(United States)	Justin Watts	30	MKS Dąbrowa Górnicza	(Poland)	Free	2021	15 July 2020	
33	G/F	(United States)	Juwann James	33	Fribourg Olympic	(Switzerland)	Free	2021	16 July 2020	
21	SF	(United States)	Henry Caruso	25	Heroes Den Bosch	(Netherlands)	Free	2021	23 August 2020	

=== Out ===
No.	Pos.	Nat.	Name	Age	Moving to		Type	Date	Source
9	SG	(Netherlands)	Jef de Vries	20	BAL	(Netherlands)	End of contract	19 June 2020	
1	PF	(United States)	Donte Thomas	24	Cantù	(Italy)	End of contract	22 June 2020	
11	G/F	(Netherlands)	Shane Hammink	25	Spirou Charleroi	(Belgium)	Mutual consent	4 July 2020	
42	SG	(United States)	Vernon Taylor	33	Union Neuchâtel	(Switzerland)	End of contract	6 July 2020	
7	G/F	(Netherlands)	Yoeri Hoexum	21	Apollo Amsterdam	(Netherlands)	End of contract	17 September 2020	
8	SF	(United States)	Jason Dourisseau	36			End of contract		
24	C	(United States)	Andrew Smith	27	Science City Jena	(Germany)	End of contract	9 September 2020	
11	PG	(United States)	Carrington Love	26	ZZ Leiden	(Netherlands)	End of contract	23 October 2020	
33	C	(Australia)	Matt McCarthy	27	CSO Voluntari	(Romania)	End of contract	17 August 2020	
0	SG	(United States)	Matt Williams Jr.	26			End of contract		
28	F	(Netherlands)	Jeffrey Sedoc	22			End of contract		

== Preseason ==
Win Loss

22 August 2020 1	Donar (Netherlands)	74–72	(Denmark) Bakken Bears	Groningen
				Arena: MartiniPlaza; Attendance: 200

23 August 2020 2	Donar (Netherlands)	75–71	(Denmark) Bakken Bears	Groningen
				Arena: MartiniPlaza

8 September 2020 3	Donar (Netherlands)	61–48	(Belgium) Belfius Mons-Hainaut	Groningen
				Arena: MartiniPlaza; Attendance: 200

9 September 2020 4	Donar (Netherlands)	66–71	(Belgium) Belfius Mons-Hainaut	Groningen
				Arena: MartiniPlaza; Attendance: 0

29 September 2020 5	Donar (Netherlands)	Cancelled	(Germany) Eisbären Bremerhaven	Groningen
				Arena: MartiniPlaza

29 December 2020 6	Donar (Netherlands)	94–64	(Netherlands) Den Helder Suns	Groningen
	Pts: Ogungbemi-Jackson 21		Pts: Brace 18	Arena: MartiniPlaza

== Basketball Champions League ==
=== Qualifying round ===
22 September 2020 Semi-final	Dnipro (Ukraine)	53–88	(Netherlands) Donar	Nicosia
	Scoring by quarter: 26–16, 27–10, 14–16, 21–11
	Pts: Lacy 19; Rebs: Caruso 6 Asts: Rudež, Ogungbemi-Jackson 5 PIR: Rudež 20	Boxscore	Pts: Shundel & Zakurdaiev 13; Rebs: Fesenko & Bondarchuk 9 Asts: Tymofeyenko 4 PIR: Bondarchuk, Zakurdaeiv 13	Arena: Tassos Papadopoulos Eleftheria Indoor Hall; Attendance: 0

24 September 2020 Final	Keravnos (Cyprus)	60–57	(Netherlands) Donar	Nicosia
	Scoring by quarter: 21–18, 11–16, 17–17, 11–6
	Pts: Rozzell 20; Rebs: Hunt 10; Asts: Rorie 3 PIR: Hunt 14	Boxscore	Pts: Ogungbemi-Jackson 15; Rebs: James 7 Asts: James 3 PIR: James 15	Arena: Tassos Papadopoulos Eleftheria Indoor Hall; Attendance: 0

== FIBA Europe Cup ==
Donar was placed in Group F of the regular season of the 2021–22 FIBA Europe Cup. The tournament was played in a bubble and was co-hosted by Donar and Heroes Den Bosch in the Maaspoort in Den Bosch.

Pos	Team	Pld	W	L	PF	PA	PD	Pts	Qualification
1	(Russia) Parma	2	2	0	178	144	+34	4	Advance to round of 16
2	(Netherlands) Heroes Den Bosch (H)	2	1	1	162	183	−21	3	Advance to round of 16
3	(Netherlands) Donar	2	0	2	179	192	−13	2	
4	(Belarus) Borisfen	0	0	0	0	0	0	0	Withdrawn

Source: FIBA Europe Cup
(H) Hosts

26 January 2021 1	Heroes Den Bosch (Netherlands)	99–98	(Netherlands) Donar	's-Hertogenbosch
	Scoring by quarter: 22–20, 25–23, 20–23, 11–10
	Pts: Van der Mars 30; Rebs: Mayfield 10; Asts: Payne 6 PIR: Van der Mars 38	Boxscore	Pts: Ogungbemi-Jackson; Rebs: Moreton 6 Asts: Ogungbemi-Jackson 6 PIR: Rudež 27	Arena: Maaspoort; Attendance: 0

28 January 2021 2	Donar (Netherlands)	81–93	(Russia) Parma	's-Hertogenbosch
	Scoring by quarter: 17–26, 24–27, 20–21, 20–19
	Pts: Ogungbemi-Jackson 25; Rebs: Moreton 6 Asts: Lacy 7 PIR: Ogungbemi-Jackson 23	Boxscore	Pts: Savović 23; Rebs: Savović 6 Asts: Williams 6 PIR: Mejeris 22	Arena: Maaspoort; Attendance: 0

== Dutch Basketball League ==
=== Regular season ===
3 October 2020 1	Donar	124–64	Almere Sailors	Groningen
19:30
	Pts: Brandwijk 27; Rebs: Brandwijk 11; Asts: Williams 6 Eff: Brandwijk 34	Boxscore	Pts: Lombardi 13; Rebs: Lombardi, Hersisia 3 Asts: van de Weijenberg, Lombardi 2 Eff: Osepa 14	Arena: MartiniPlaza; Attendance: 0

== Statistics ==
Legend
GP	Games played	GS	Games started	MPG	Minutes per game	RPG	Rebounds per game
APG	Assists per game	SPG	Steals per game	BPG	Blocks per game	PPG	Points per game
FG%	Field-goal percentage	3P%	3-point field-goal percentage	FT%	Free-throw percentage	TO	Turnovers per game
PF	Fouls per game		Team leader		League leader

=== Dutch Basketball League ===
Player	GP	MPG	FG%	3P%	FT%	RPG	APG	SPG	BPG	PPG
Jarred Ogungbemi-Jackson	26	28.8	.506	.496	.872	5.0	3.6	0.9	0.2	17.7
DaVonté Lacy	26	24.0	.421	.337	.784	2.5	2.3	1.1	0.1	11.3
Juwann James	20	20.4	.681	.000	.465	3.3	2.0	0.7	0.4	8.9
Leon Williams	25	25.4	.472	.424	.812	2.8	3.6	1.1	0.0	8.8
Henry Caruso	25	21.7	.493	.429	.750	5.7	1.5	0.8	0.0	8.3
Damjan Rudez	25	24.7	.348	.280	.765	3.8	2.8	0.7	0.1	8.0
Justin Watts	19	17.2	.415	.319	.591	3.3	0.9	0.6	0.2	7.7
Will Moreton	24	17.7	.440	.365	.781	2.7	0.9	1.2	0.2	7.5
Thomas Koenis	15	19.0	.500	.267	.524	5.3	1.1	0.8	0.3	7.1
Willem Brandwijk	24	19.6	.560	.200	.433	5.5	0.7	0.6	0.4	6.6
Sheyi Adetunji	5	4.6	.500	.286	.667	0.0	0.6	1.2	0.0	3.2
Nesta Agasi	11	6.9	.579	.000	.231	2.5	0.4	0.5	0.2	2.3
Kjeld Zuidema	8	5.5	.400	.143	1.000	1.1	0.2	0.1	0.1	1.8

== Awards and honors ==
Recipient	Award	Date awarded	Ref.
Jarred Ogungbemi-Jackson	DBL All-Star Team	29 April	
