= Niklas (name) =

Niklas is a masculine given name, a Germanic variant of Nicholas. It is most common in Sweden and among the Swedish-speaking population of Finland. It is also used as a surname. Notable people with that name include:

== Given name ==
- Niklas (singer), Danish singer-songwriter
- Niklas Almqvist, Swedish guitarist and backup vocalist of the Swedish Garage Rock band The Hives
- Niklas Andersen, Swedish footballer
- Niklas Andersson, Swedish ice hockey player
- Niklas Bäckström, Finnish ice hockey player
- Niklas Edin, Swedish curler
- Niklas Eriksson, Swedish Olympic ice hockey player
- Niklas Forsmoo (born 1983), Swedish handball player
- Niklas Fuglestad (born 2006), Norwegian footballer
- Niklas Gudmundsson (born 1972), Swedish footballer
- Niklas Graßelt, German politician
- Niklas Hagman, Finnish ice hockey player
- Niklas Hjalmarsson, Swedish ice hockey player
- Niklas Hogner, Swedish figure skater
- Niklas Karlsson (born 1974), Swedish politician
- Niklas Kaul, German Olympic decathlete
- Niklas Kiel, German basketball player
- Niklas Klingberg, Swedish motorcycle speedway rider
- Niklas Kronwall, Swedish ice hockey player
- Niklas Kvarforth, Swedish musician, composer and vocalist of the black metal band Shining
- Niklas Landin, Danish handball player
- Niklas Luhmann, German sociologist
- Niklas Malacinski, American Nordic combined skier
- Niklas Mattsson, Swedish ice hockey player
- Niklas Meinert, German field hockey midfielder
- Niklas Mohr (born 2004), German footballer
- Niklas Moisander, Finnish footballer
- Niklas Nordgren, Swedish ice hockey player
- Niklas Nüssle (born 1994), German politician
- Niklas Ødegård (born 2004), Norwegian footballer
- Niklas Sandberg, Swedish football player
- Niklas Schenker, German politician
- Niklas Skoog, Swedish football striker
- Niklas Steffen (born 2001), Swiss footballer
- Niklas Strömstedt, Swedish pop singer and songwriter
- Niklas Süle, German footballer
- Niklas Sundblad, Swedish ice hockey player
- Niklas Sundin, Swedish guitarist of Dark Tranquillity and Laethora
- Niklas Sundström, Swedish ice hockey player
- Niklas Tarvajärvi, Finnish footballer
- Niklas Teichgräber (born 1996), German former footballer
- Niklas Willén, Swedish conductor
- Niklas Würzner, German basketball player
- Niklas Zennström, Swedish entrepreneur

== Surname ==
- Wilhelm Niklas (1887–1957), German academic and politician
