= Iisalo =

Iisalo is a surname. Notable people with the surname include:

- Joonas Iisalo (born 1986), Finnish basketball player and coach
- Tuomas Iisalo (born 1982), Finnish basketball player and coach
