= Elias Lasisi =

Belgian basketball player (born 1992)

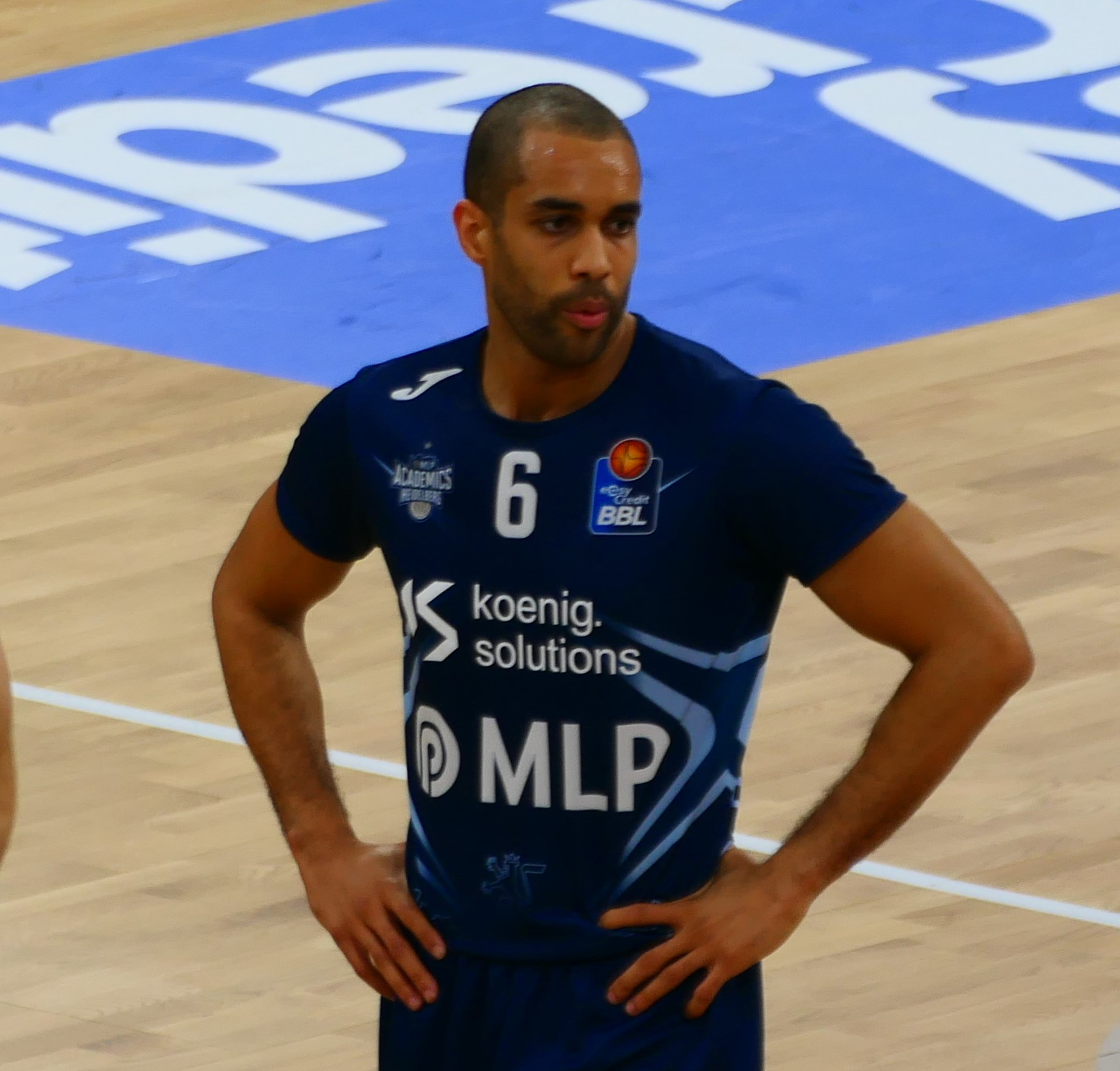
- Lasisi with Academics Heidelberg in October 2022

No. 3 – Okapi Aalst
- Position: Shooting guard
- League: BNXT League

Personal information
- Born: 9 January 1992 (age 34) Leuven, Belgium
- Listed height: 1.91 m (6 ft 3 in)
- Listed weight: 80 kg (176 lb)

Career information
- NBA draft: 2014: undrafted
- Playing career: 2012–present

Career history
- 2012–2015: Leuven Bears
- 2015–2017: Limburg United
- 2017: Le Portel
- 2017–2019: Oostende
- 2019–2020: BG Göttingen
- 2020: Brose Bamberg
- 2020–2022: Crailsheim Merlins
- 2022–2024: MLP Academics Heidelberg
- 2024–2026: Antwerp Giants
- 2026–present: Okapi Aalst

Career highlights
- 3× PBL champion (2018, 2019, 2025–26); 2× Belgian Cup champion (2018, 2026)

Elias Lasisi (born 9 January 1992) is a Belgian professional basketball player for Okapi Aalst of the BNXT League. He has also been a member of the Belgium national basketball team.

== Professional career ==
Lasisi formerly played in Belgium for Leuven Bears and Limburg United. In January 2017 Lasisi and Limburg mutually agreed to terminate his contract due to breach of disciplinary rules according to the club. Lasisi then joined French ProA side ESSM Le Portel. He returned to Belgium for the 2017-19 campaign, joining Oostende. With Oostende, Lasisi won two Pro Basketball League titles.

On 22 August 2019, Lasisi signed with BG Göttingen in Germany. In the autumn of 2020, he joined Brose Bamberg, staying on a short-term contract until 30 October 2020. He appeared in one Champions League contest for Bamberg. On 3 November 2020, Lasisi signed with the Crailsheim Merlins.

On 19 August 2022, he signed with MLP Academics Heidelberg of the Basketball Bundesliga (BBL).

On 21 June 2024, he signed with Antwerp Giants of the BNXT League.

On July 16, 2026, he signed with Okapi Aalst of the BNXT League.

== National team career ==
Lasisi was selected for Belgium for the 2019 FIBA Basketball World Cup qualification games against Bosnia and Herzegovina and France.
