= 2024–25 Basketball Bundesliga =

Basketball Bundesliga
- Season: 2024–25
- Dates: 20 September 2024 – 26 June 2025
- Teams: 17

Regular season
- Top seed: Bayern Munich
- Season MVP: Jhivvan Jackson (Würzburg Baskets)
- Relegated: BG Göttingen

Finals
- Champions: Bayern Munich
- Runners-up: Ratiopharm Ulm
- Semi-finalists: MLP Academics Heidelberg; FIT/One Würzburg Baskets

Statistical leaders
Points	Jarred Ogungbemi-Jackson; Brandon Randolph	19.0
Rebounds	Demajeo Wiggins	10.3
Assists	Geno Crandall	7.5

Seasons
- ← 2023–24 2025–26 →

The 2024–25 Basketball Bundesliga, known as the easyCredit BBL for sponsorship reasons, was the 59th season of the Basketball Bundesliga (BBL), the top-tier level of professional club basketball in Germany. It ran from 20 September 2024 to 26 June 2025. The season will be played with 17 teams after only one team was promoted from the ProA and no wildcards given out.

Bayern Munich won their second straight and seventh overall title with a finals win over Ratiopharm Ulm.

== Format ==
After a double round-robin, the top six teams from the regular season qualified for the playoffs. Teams placed seven to ten entered into a play-in tournament for the final two seeds of the playoffs.

== Teams ==
Location of teams in 2024–25 Basketball Bundesliga

=== Team changes ===
Promoted from 2023–24 ProA	Relegated from 2023–24 Basketball Bundesliga
Skyliners Frankfurt; ~~Karlsruhe Lions~~	Crailsheim Merlins; Tigers Tübingen

- Karlsruhe Lions were not allowed to participate after not getting the license. The other teams voted that no relegated team would receive a wildcard.

=== Arenas and locations ===
Team	City	Arena	Capacity
Bamberg Baskets	Bamberg	Brose Arena	6,150
Alba Berlin	Berlin	Uber Arena	14,500
Telekom Baskets Bonn	Bonn	Telekom Dome	6,000
Löwen Braunschweig	Braunschweig	Volkswagen Halle	6,600
Niners Chemnitz	Chemnitz	Chemnitz Arena	5,200
Skyliners Frankfurt	Frankfurt	Süwag Energie ARENA	5,002
BG Göttingen	Göttingen	Sparkassen Arena	3,447
Hamburg Towers	Hamburg	Inselpark Arena	3,400
Hamburg Towers	Hamburg	Barclays Arena (1 Game)	13,000
MLP Academics Heidelberg	Heidelberg	SNP Dome	5,000
MHP Riesen Ludwigsburg	Ludwigsburg	MHP-Arena	5,300
Syntainics MBC	Weißenfels	Stadthalle Weißenfels	3,000
Bayern Munich	Munich	BMW Park	6,700
EWE Baskets Oldenburg	Oldenburg	Große EWE Arena	6,069
Rostock Seawolves	Rostock	Stadthalle Rostock	4,550
ratiopharm Ulm	Ulm	ratiopharm arena	6,000
Rasta Vechta	Vechta	Rasta Dome	3,140
FIT/One Würzburg Baskets	Würzburg	s.Oliver Arena	3,140

== Regular season ==
=== Standings ===
Pos	Team	Pld	W	L	PF	PA	PD	PCT	Qualification or relegation
1	Bayern Munich	32	24	8	2660	2440	+220	.750	Advance to playoffs
2	Ratiopharm Ulm	32	23	9	2832	2561	+271	.719	Advance to playoffs
3	Basketball Löwen Braunschweig	32	20	12	2690	2585	+105	.625	Advance to playoffs
4	Niners Chemnitz	32	18	14	2647	2725	−78	.563 (Note: Chemnitz 4 wins, Heidelberg 3 wins, Würzburg 3 wins, Berlin 2 wins. Heidelberg ahead of Würzburg ranked based on points difference in head-to-head games.)	Advance to playoffs
5	MLP Academics Heidelberg	32	18	14	2567	2586	−19	.563	Advance to playoffs
6	FIT/One Würzburg Baskets	32	18	14	2657	2580	+77	.563	Advance to playoffs
7	Alba Berlin	32	18	14	2785	2553	+232	.563	Qualification to play-in
8	Mitteldeutscher BC	32	17	15	2724	2733	−9	.531	Qualification to play-in
9	Baskets Oldenburg	32	16	16	2858	2845	+13	.500 (Note: Oldenburg 4 wins, Rostock 4 wins, Ludwigsburg 2 wins, Vechta 2 wins. Tied teams ranked based on points difference in head-to-head games.)	Qualification to play-in
10	Rostock Seawolves	32	16	16	2604	2596	+8	.500	Qualification to play-in
11	Riesen Ludwigsburg	32	16	16	2439	2386	+53	.500	
12	Rasta Vechta	32	16	16	2555	2613	−58	.500	
13	Hamburg Towers	32	15	17	2596	2671	−75	.469	
14	Telekom Baskets Bonn	32	14	18	2696	2698	−2	.438	
15	Bamberg Baskets	32	12	20	2680	2753	−73	.375	
16	Skyliners Frankfurt	32	8	24	2418	2641	−223	.250	
17	BG Göttingen	32	3	29	2593	3035	−442	.094	Relegation to ProA

Source: BBL
Rules for classification: 1) points; 2) head-to-head points; 3) head-to-head points difference; 4) head-to-head number of points scored.

=== Results ===
Home \ Away	BAM	BER	BON	BRA	CHE	FRA	GÖT	HAM	HEI	LUD	MBC	MÜN	OLD	ROS	ULM	VEC	WUR
Bamberg Baskets	—	87–82	92–73	77–96	81–80	92–85	92–101	80–83	90–93	73–75	87–69	69–68	103–85	75–89	77–98	86–73	93–98
Alba Berlin	86–77	—	102–88	65–61	78–81	89–68	101–69	92–77	92–65	60–74	90–62	88–81	105–70	85–96	96–88	83–58	80–84
Telekom Baskets Bonn	87–77	91–87	—	85–81	80–84	70–77	80–67	93–96	85–80	79–89	95–80	86–90	81–76	83–72	75–95	88–94	81–90
Basketball Löwen Braunschweig	114–88	73–108	74–94	—	82–74	79–72	101–77	91–79	65–72	91–71	76–70	72–90	83–82	80–63	98–89	103–70	86–72
Niners Chemnitz	99–98	81–103	88–123	83–95	—	85–66	96–88	69–60	72–65	104–100	82–72	72–94	87–78	108–102	86–90	88–77	81–77
Skyliners Frankfurt	58–66	61–75	76–70	91–92	65–70	—	95–94	78–84	72–95	77–69	69–79	84–91	83–72	72–77	87–85	74–75	70–85
BG Göttingen	97–88	83–109	85–112	86–107	90–94	72–100	—	75–92	73–95	74–79	80–94	81–95	93–96	88–85	72–91	66–86	80–97
Hamburg Towers	93–114	97–80	91–84	86–91	88–93	91–78	91–82	—	88–81	66–73	75–96	74–70	87–78	78–77	64–79	86–73	68–66
MLP Academics Heidelberg	68–79	90–86	76–95	74–94	81–66	84–75	93–86	73–68	—	86–73	87–78	59–87	95–79	86–81	74–90	80–74	67–72
Riesen Ludwigsburg	92–73	63–79	81–61	69–83	69–65	82–61	91–62	89–78	63–67	—	85–76	78–70	66–79	70–64	92–71	77–79	82–91
Mitteldeutscher BC	99–94	94–76	100–94	82–77	97–95	85–72	93–91	102–81	93–108	76–70	—	79–75	92–77	84–87	89–92	91–83	110–101
Bayern Munich	84–82	99–86	93–73	94–72	73–59	70–56	94–86	81–80	87–78	73–72	90–88	—	89–75	91–66	70–62	77–78	70–69
Baskets Oldenburg	67–59	97–92	91–96	102–90	104–94	102–92	111–94	99–81	105–82	70–64	95–97	83–94	—	92–79	93–66	91–75	96–85
Rostock Seawolves	98–74	71–78	64–69	48–67	60–68	83–66	102–74	92–78	88–82	94–89	84–76	70–80	122–118	—	85–67	87–83	65–92
Ratiopharm Ulm	92–77	101–90	84–75	111–75	117–87	115–88	109–70	82–72	67–69	63–62	92–66	109–94	119–92	82–72	—	85–76	85–76
Rasta Vechta	101–98	96–93	83–75	91–88	89–66	74–80	87–79	69–79	78–60	64–70	87–79	79–65	98–91	68–84	73–84	—	78–86
FIT/One Würzburg Baskets	70–82	70–69	83–75	70–53	83–90	89–70	79–78	91–85	85–102	77–60	86–76	75–81	102–112	93–97	89–72	74–86	—

Source: BBL
Legend: Blue = home team win; Red = away team win.

== Playoffs ==
=== Play-in tournament ===
Only the top six seeds advanced directly to the playoffs, while the next four seeds participated in a play-in tournament. The seventh place team hosted the eighth place team in the double-chance round needing to win one game to advance, with the winner clinching the seventh seed in the playoffs. The ninth place team hosted the tenth place team in the elimination round requiring two wins to advance, with the loser being eliminated from the competition. The loser in the double-chance round hosted the elimination-round game-winner, with the winner clinching the eighth seed and the loser being eliminated. The games were played on 11 and 13 May 2025.

Play-in games
7	Alba Berlin	81
8	Mitteldeutscher BC	78
9	Baskets Oldenburg	95
10	Rostock Seawolves	83

No. 8 seed game
8	Mitteldeutscher BC	110
9	Baskets Oldenburg	95

Final seeds
7	Alba Berlin	No. 7 seed
8	Mitteldeutscher BC	No. 8 seed

Bold Game winner

=== Bracket ===
The rounds were played in a best-of-five format.

Quarterfinals
1	Bayern Munich	3
8	Mitteldeutscher BC	0
4	Niners Chemnitz	1
5	MLP Academics Heidelberg	3
2	Ratiopharm Ulm	3
7	Alba Berlin	0
3	Basketball Löwen Braunschweig	2
6	FIT/One Würzburg Baskets	3

Semifinals
1	Bayern Munich	3
5	MLP Academics Heidelberg	1
2	Ratiopharm Ulm	3
6	FIT/One Würzburg Baskets	2

Finals
1	Bayern Munich	3
2	Ratiopharm Ulm	2

== Awards and statistics ==
=== Major award winners ===
The awards were announced in May 2025.

Award	Player	Club
Most Valuable Player	(United States) Jhivvan Jackson	FIT/One Würzburg Baskets
Finals MVP	(United States) Shabazz Napier	Bayern Munich
Top Scorer	(Canada) Jarred Ogungbemi-Jackson (United States) Brandon Randolph	Riesen Ludwigsburg; Rasta Vechta
Best Offensive Player	(United States) Jhivvan Jackson	FIT/One Würzburg Baskets
Best Defender	(Germany) Nick Weiler-Babb	Bayern Munich
Most Effective Player International	(United States) Jhivvan Jackson	FIT/One Würzburg Baskets
Most Effective Player National	(Germany) Sananda Fru	Basketball Löwen Braunschweig
Best German Young Player	(Germany) Sananda Fru	Basketball Löwen Braunschweig
Coach of the Year	(Spain) Jesús Ramírez	Basketball Löwen Braunschweig

=== Statistical leaders ===
Category	Player	Club	Average
Points per game	(Canada) Jarred Ogungbemi-Jackson (United States) Brandon Randolph	Riesen Ludwigsburg; Rasta Vechta	19.0
Rebounds per game	(United States) Demajeo Wiggins	BG Göttingen	10.3
Assists per game	(United States) Geno Crandall	Baskets Oldenburg	7.5
Steals per game	(United States) Justin Simon	Riesen Ludwigsburg	2.3
Blocks per game	(United States) Isaiah Cozart (Germany) Sananda Fru (United States) Kur Kuath	Rasta Vechta; Basketball Löwen Braunschweig; Hamburg Towers	1.6
Efficiency per game	(Germany) Sananda Fru	Basketball Löwen Braunschweig	17.4

== German clubs in European competitions ==
Team	Competition	Result
Alba Berlin	EuroLeague	Regular season
Bayern Munich	EuroLeague	Play-in
Niners Chemnitz	Champions League	Play-ins
Rasta Vechta	Champions League	Regular season
FIT/One Würzburg Baskets	Champions League	Round of 16
Telekom Baskets Bonn	Champions League	Play-ins
Hamburg Towers	EuroCup	Regular season
ratiopharm Ulm	EuroCup	Regular season
Riesen Ludwigsburg	FIBA Europe Cup	Play-offs
Lowen Braunschweig	FIBA Europe Cup	Regular season

== German clubs in Regional competitions ==
Team	Competition	Progress
Bamberg Baskets	European North Basketball League	Quarterfinals

== Attendances ==
=== Home games and overall ===
As of 24 June 2025

Pos.	Team	Regular season			Play-in and playoffs			Overall			2023–24 average	Change
Pos.	Team	Matches	Attendance	Average	Matches	Attendance	Average	Matches	Total	Average	2023–24 average	Change
1	FC Bayern Munich	16	111,389	6,962	7	79,900	11,414	23	191,289	8,317	5,997	+38.7%
2	ALBA Berlin	16	132,429	8,277	2	14,073	7,037	18	146,502	8,139	8,403	−3.1%
3	EWE Baskets Oldenburg	16	99,200	6,200	1	6,200	6,200	17	105,400	6,200	6,200	0.0%
4	Telekom Baskets Bonn	16	93,277	5,830	0	—	—	16	93,277	5,830	5,872	−0.7%
5	Ratiopharm Ulm	16	91,302	5,706	7	42,000	6,000	23	133,302	5,796	5,850	−0.9%
6	MLP Academics Heidelberg	16	78,071	4,879	4	18,058	4,515	20	96,129	4,806	4,358	+10.3%
7	NINERS Chemnitz	16	76,848	4,803	2	9,474	4,737	18	86,322	4,796	4,666	+2.8%
8	Basketball Löwen Braunschweig	16	72,907	4,557	3	16,839	5,613	19	89,746	4,723	4,501	+4.9%
9	Bamberg Baskets	16	74,421	4,651	0	—	—	16	74,421	4,651	4,702	−1.1%
10	SKYLINERS	16	69,772	4,361	0	—	—	16	69,772	4,361	—	—
11	ROSTOCK SEAWOLVES	16	69,666	4,354	0	—	—	16	69,666	4,354	4,252	+2.4%
12	Veolia Towers Hamburg	16	61,288	3,830	0	—	—	16	61,288	3,830	3,637	+5.3%
13	MHP RIESEN Ludwigsburg	16	60,731	3,796	0	—	—	16	60,731	3,796	3,902	−2.7%
14	SC RASTA Vechta	16	50,023	3,126	0	—	—	16	50,023	3,126	3,130	−0.1%
15	Fitness First Würzburg Baskets	16	48,660	3,041	4	12,560	3,140	20	61,220	3,061	2,985	+2.5%
16	SYNTAINICS MBC	16	41,700	2,606	2	5,100	2,550	18	46,800	2,600	2,536	+2.5%
17	BG Göttingen	16	40,735	2,546	0	—	—	16	40,735	2,546	3,125	−18.5%
League total		272	1,272,419	4,678	32	204,204	6,381	304	1,476,623	4,857	4,414	+10.0%

Sources: Sport.de regular season, Sport.de play-in and playoffs and 2023–24 regular-season averages. The change is calculated by comparing the 2024–25 overall average with the 2023–24 regular-season average. The dash indicates that the team did not participate in the postseason or, in the case of SKYLINERS, did not participate in the 2023–24 Basketball Bundesliga season.
