= Nikles =

Nikles is a surname. Notable people with this surname include:

- Christian Nikles (born 1997), Bruneian swimmer
- Hans Nikles (fl. 1930s), Swiss football player
- Johan Nikles (born 1997), Swiss tennis player

== See also ==
- Niklas (name)
