= Tim Coleman (basketball) =

American basketball player

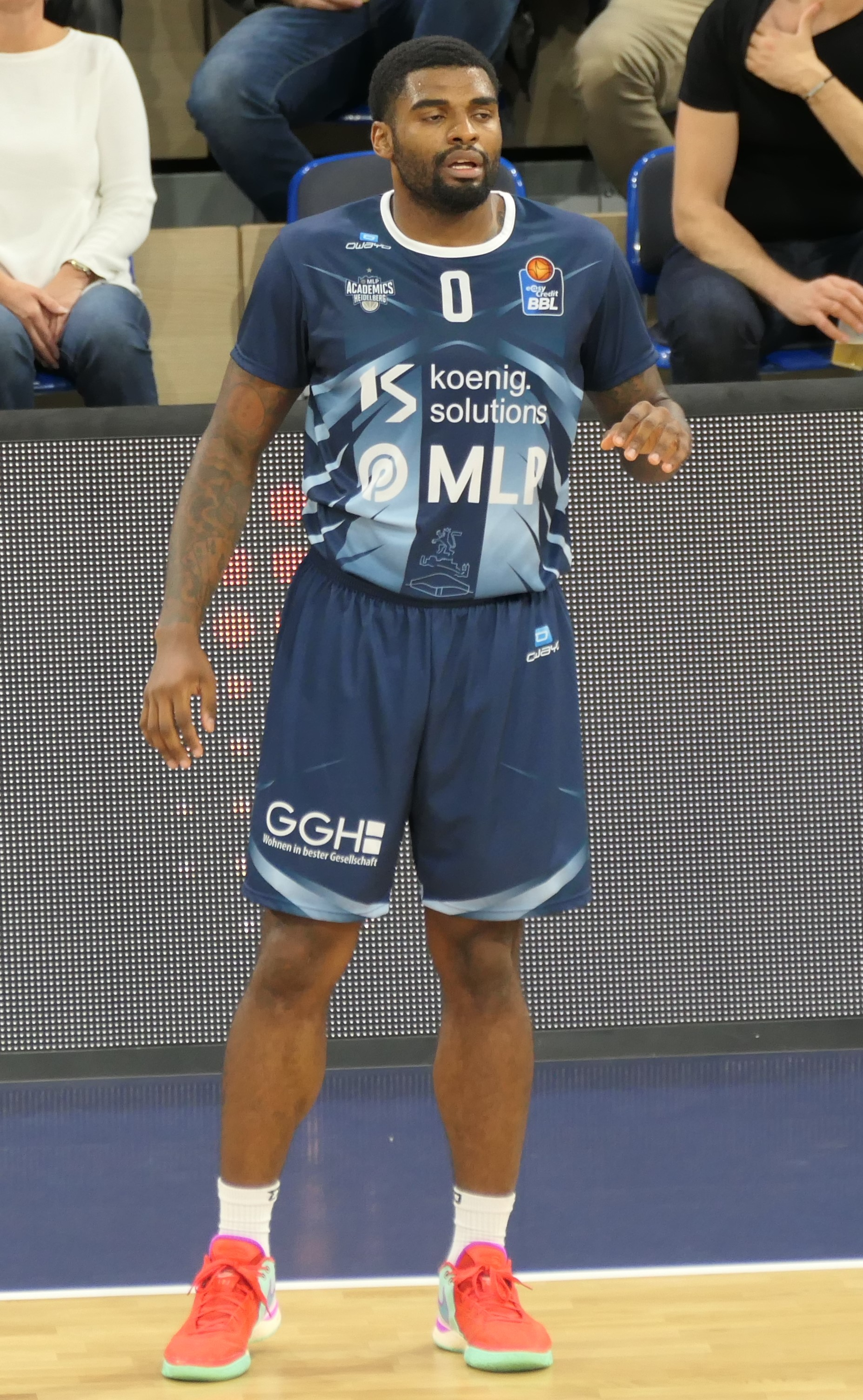
- Coleman playing for Heidelberg in 2023

No. 0 – MLP Academics Heidelberg
- Position: Small forward
- League: Basketball Bundesliga

Personal information
- Born: January 4, 1995 (age 31) Newark, New Jersey, U.S.
- Listed height: 6 ft 5 in (1.96 m)
- Listed weight: 209 lb (95 kg)

Career information
- High school: St. Anthony (Jersey City, New Jersey)
- College: NJIT (2013–2017)
- NBA draft: 2017: undrafted
- Playing career: 2018–present

Career history
- 2018–2019: B.B.C. Etzella
- 2019–2020: Vilpas Vikings
- 2020: Hapoel Gilboa Galil
- 2022–present: MLP Academics Heidelberg

Career highlights
- Luxembourg Basketball League champion (2019); Luxembourg Basketball League Cup winner (2019); Luxembourg Basketball League MVP (2019); Luxembourg Basketball League Finals MVP (2019)

Timothy James Coleman (born January 4, 1995) is an American professional basketball player.

Born in Newark, New Jersey, and raised in Union Township, Union County, New Jersey, Coleman played prep basketball at St. Anthony High School and collegiately for the NJIT Highlanders.

== Club career ==
In 2022, he joined MLP Academics Heidelberg.

In July 2023, he extended his contract for another year.

== Player profile ==
In July 2022, Coleman's coach Joonas Iisalo said that Coleman "is an incredibly versatile player who can play many positions. He can rebound and defend multiple positions."
