= Shyron Ely =

American basketball player

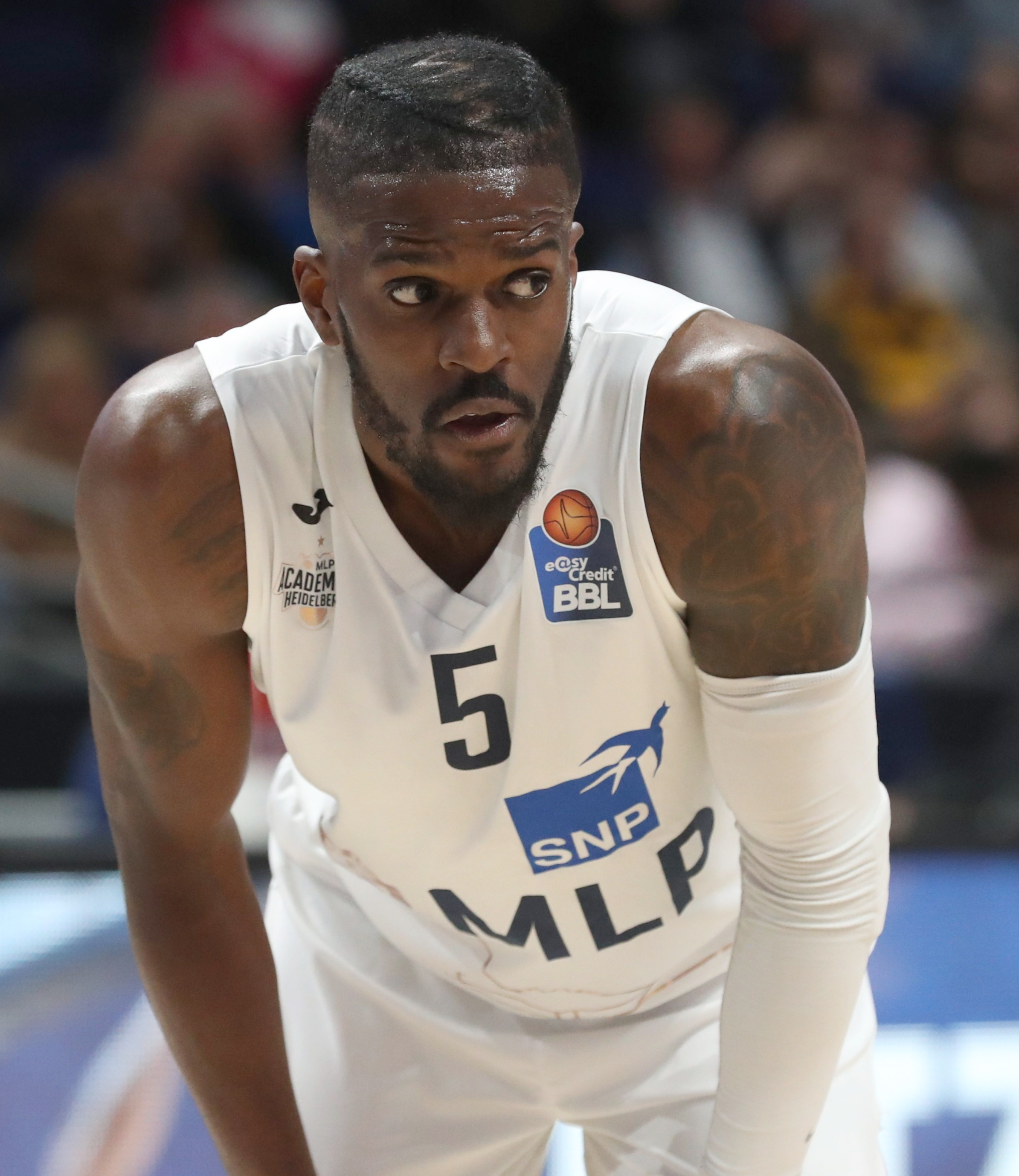

USC Heidelberg
- Title: Assistant coach
- League: Basketball Bundesliga

Personal information
- Born: 16 July 1987 (age 39) Washington, Pennsylvania, U.S.
- Listed height: 6 ft 4 in (1.93 m)
- Listed weight: 198 lb (90 kg)

Career information
- High school: Speedway (Speedway, Indiana)
- College: Evansville (2005–2009)
- NBA draft: 2009: undrafted
- Playing career: 2009–2023
- Position: Shooting guard
- Number: 5
- Coaching career: 2025–present

Career history

Playing
- 2009–2011: Iowa Energy
- 2011–2012: Dakota Wizards
- 2012–2013: BC Boncourt
- 2013–2014: MLP Academics Heidelberg
- 2014–2015: Le Mans Sarthe Basket
- 2015–2023: MLP Academics Heidelberg

Coaching
- 2025–present: MLP Academics Heidelberg (assistant)

Career highlights
- No. 5 retired by MLP Academics Heidelberg; First-team All-MVC (2009)

Shyron Quonell "Shy" Ely is an American professional basketball coach and former player who played at the shooting guard position. He is the current assistant coach for USC Heidelberg of the Basketball Bundesliga (BBL).

== Playing career ==
Shyron Ely played his first game for MLP Academics Heidelberg in 2013.

In July 2023, he left at the age of 36 after playing a total of 215 games for the club. His jersey number 5 would not be issued in the next five years, the club announced.

"It's fair to say that a special era is coming to an end. Shy has shaped this club like no other in recent club history," said managing director Matthias Lautenschläger.

== Coaching career ==
On August 8, 2025, he started his coaching career as an assistant coach at USC Heidelberg of the Basketball Bundesliga (BBL).

== Personal ==
Shyron married his wife Anna in 2018.

His sister Shyra Ely is a former WNBA player.
