= Uwe Sauer (basketball) =

German basketball player (born 1963)

Personal information
- Born: 23 February 1963 (age 63) Karlsruhe, West Germany

Career information
- College: Santa Clara (1984–1986)

Career history

Playing
- 1981–1984: USC Heidelberg
- 1986–1988: Saturn Köln
- 1989–1992: Brandt Hagen
- 1992–1997: SSV Ulm 1846

Coaching
- 1997–1999: SSV Ulm 1846
- 2011–2012: USC Heidelberg

Uwe Sauer (born 23 February 1963) is a former German basketball player and coach. He competed in the men's tournament at the 1984 Summer Olympics.
