= USC Heidelberg =

Professional basketball team in Heidelberg, Germany

MLP Academics Heidelberg
- League: ProA
- Founded: 1952; 74 years ago
- History: TB Heidelberg (1947–1953); USC Heidelberg (1953–2012); MLP Academics Heidelberg (2012–present)
- Arena: SNP Dome
- Capacity: 5,000
- Location: Heidelberg, Germany
- Team colors: Navy, White, Gold
- Head coach: Daniel Jansson
- Championships: 9 German Championships; 2 German Cups; 1 ProA
- Website: www.mlp-academics.de
Home	Away

USC Heidelberg, for sponsorship reasons named MLP Academics Heidelberg, is a professional basketball club from Heidelberg, Baden-Württemberg, Germany. The team has won nine German championships in its history, the last being in 1977. The club's men's senior team currently plays in the ProA, the second division, following their relegation from the Basketball Bundesliga at the end of the 2025–26 season, where they spent five seasons.

== History ==
=== A Triumphant Legacy ===
The team was dominant in the 1950s and 1960s, as well as in the West German Basketball League, winning a total of 9 German championships (1957–1962, 1966, 1973, 1977).

In the 2020–21 season, Heidelberg won its first-ever ProA championship and gained promotion to the first level Basketball Bundesliga (BBL).

=== Return to the Basketball Bundesliga (2021–present) ===
Heidelberg finished the 2021–22 Basketball Bundesliga season with 11 wins and 23 losses in 15th place out of 18, after surprisingly winning their first three Bundesliga games. With that cushion, the underdog was always able to stay out of the relegation spots despite the losing streak that followed.

Despite the success in 2021–22, Heidelberg changed its head coach for the 2022/23 season and brought in six new players.

Branislav Ignjatovic had served as head coach for eight years. In 2022, the Finish head coach Joonas Iisalo then took over. He came from Telekom Baskets Bonn, where he assisted his brother Tuomas as an assistant coach. The brothers' team had taken Bonn from a medium power to second place and qualified for the playoff semifinals. The Iisalos' tactics were known for a lot of passing.

As in the promotion season, the goal for the second year was to stay in the league, according to general manager Matthias Lautenschläger.

Brekkott Chapman joined the Japanese team Koshigaya Alphas. Robert Lowery and Kelvin Martin left Heidelberg without a new team. Albert Kuppe, Phillipp Heyden and Courtney Stockard ended their professional careers. Kuppe cited mental and physical reasons for his decision. Kuppe's departure was a surprise, which is why Leon Friederici, who was actually scheduled to leave, returned to the team.

For the 2022/23 season, Tim Coleman (32), who last played for the Crailsheim Merlins in 2021, joined Heidelberg.

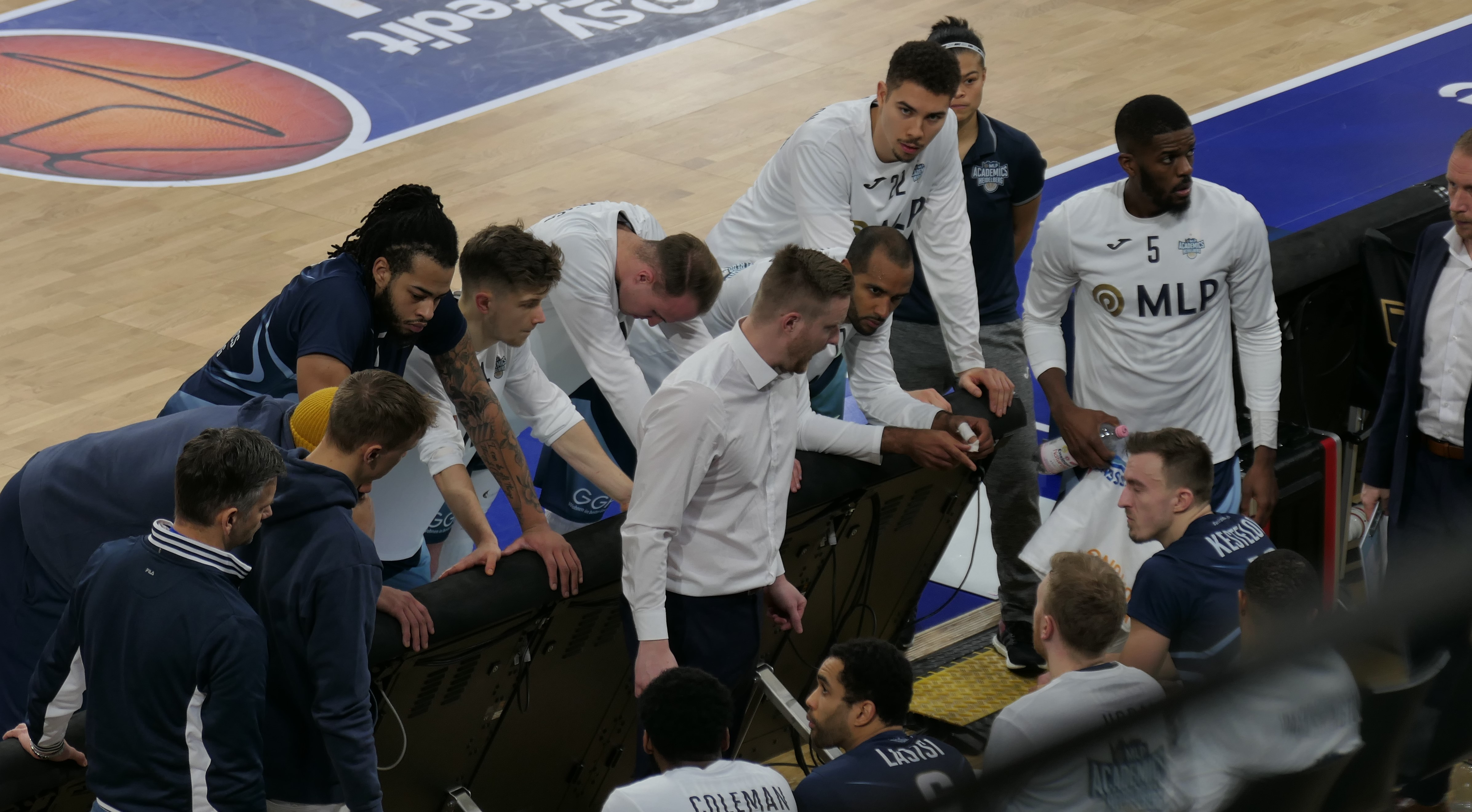
Huddle in January 2023.

Eric Washington came from Niners Chemnitz as Heidelberg's new floor general. As playmaker he would "create opportunities, especially in transition, after blocks and from isolation" and "play defensively with commitment and passion," said new Heidelberg head coach Joonas Iisalo.

Further, Lukas Herzog joined Heidelberg from MHP Riesen Ludwigsburg. In Ludwigsburg, the youngster had been known for his work ethic and defense. Both qualities let him accumulate many minutes there.

With Akeem Vargas, Heidelberg acquired the former captain of BG Göttingen. Vargas returned to play in his hometown of Heidelberg.

The new recruit Elias Lasisi had already played with the then assistant coach Joonas Iisalo for Crailsheim.

Another recruit was Power forward De'jon Davis (24). Niklas Würzner's contract was extended until 2024.

In July 2023, Shyron "Shy" Ely left the team at age 36. He had played his first game for the Academics in 2013. Overall, he had played a total of 215 games for the club. His jersey number 5 would not be issued in the next five years, the club announced. "It's fair to say that a special era is coming to an end. Shy has shaped this club like no other in recent club history," said managing director Matthias Lautenschläger.

== Names ==
- TB Heidelberg (1947–1953)
- USC Heidelberg (1953–present)
- MLP Academics Heidelberg (2012–present)

== Arenas ==
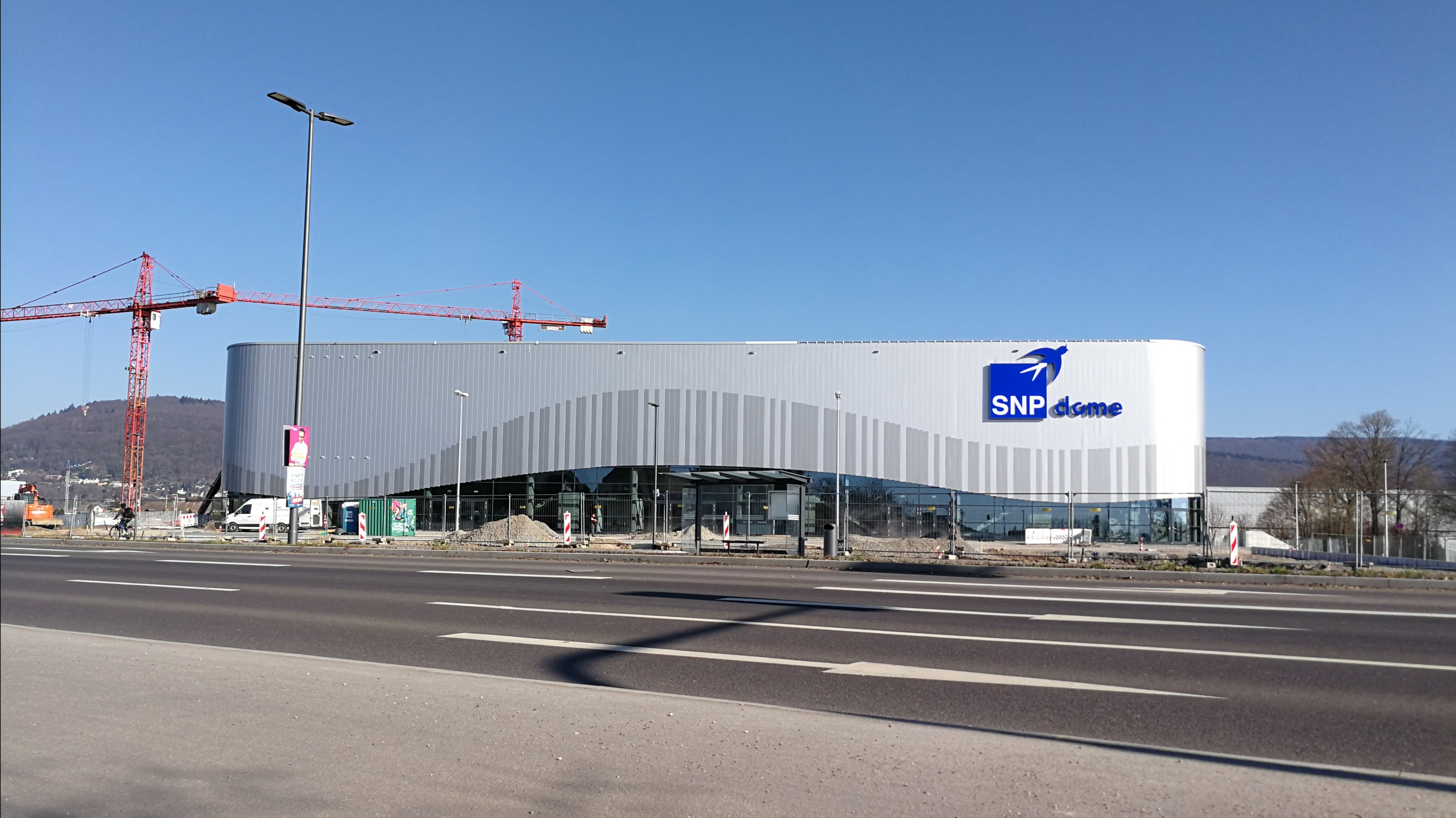
Outside view of the SNP Dome

During the majority of the club's existence, Heidelberg played at the Olympiastützpunkt Rhein-Neckar, where it was based from 1972. In 2021, the club entered the newly built SNP Dome, which has a capacity of 5,000 spectators. On 25 March 2021, the inaugural game in the arena was played against the Eisbären Bremerhaven.

In late December 2022, Heidelberg played against FC Bayern Munich in the nearby SAP Arena (Mannheim), where the team drew a record crow of 10,454 visitors. For each ticket sold, a donation was made to the Courage Foundation for the support of chronically ill children.

== Players ==
=== Current roster ===
Note: Flags indicate national team eligibility at FIBA-sanctioned events. Players may hold other non-FIBA nationalities not displayed.

MLP Academics Heidelberg roster
Players
Coaches

Pos.	No.	Nat.	Name	Ht.	Wt.	Age
G	0	(United States)	Harris, Chuck	1.88 m (6 ft 2 in)	91 kg (201 lb)	25 – 21 September 2001
PG	2	(Germany)	Würzner, Niklas	1.96 m (6 ft 5 in)	85 kg (187 lb)	32 – 2 February 1994
G	3	(Germany) (United States)	McClain, Kevin	1.90 m (6 ft 3 in)	82 kg (181 lb)	30 – 21 October 1996
G	8	(Germany)	Vengert, Dominic	1.98 m (6 ft 6 in)	88 kg (194 lb)	20 – 28 April 2006
SF	9	(Germany)	Zipser, Paul	2.03 m (6 ft 8 in)	94 kg (207 lb)	32 – 18 February 1994
G	10	(Germany)	Hoffmann, Julius	1.95 m (6 ft 5 in)	95 kg (209 lb)	21 – 15 February 2005
SG	11	(Austria)	Ersek, Erol	1.93 m (6 ft 4 in)	88 kg (194 lb)	27 – 20 April 1999
F/C	12	(Germany)	Diez, Felix	2.06 m (6 ft 9 in)	100 kg (220 lb)	20 – 18 February 2006
F	15	(Germany)	Ferner, Joschka	2.01 m (6 ft 7 in)	93 kg (205 lb)	30 – 5 January 1996
F/C	19	(Germany)	Brenneke, Lorenz	2.04 m (6 ft 8 in)	105 kg (231 lb)	26 – 2 January 2000
F	21	(Germany) (United States)	Rahming, Cantia	2.01 m (6 ft 7 in)	93 kg (205 lb)	24 – 21 November 2001
F	22	(Germany)	Humpert, Oskar	2.02 m (6 ft 8 in)	98 kg (216 lb)	21 – 3 June 2005
G	29	(Germany)	Roth, Lukas	1.89 m (6 ft 2 in)	87 kg (192 lb)	24 – 9 April 2002
C	33	(United States)	Muszynski, Nick	2.11 m (6 ft 11 in)	109 kg (240 lb)	27 – 19 November 1998
F	55	(United States)	Champion, Frank	2.01 m (6 ft 7 in)	100 kg (220 lb)	24 – 4 July 2002

Head coach

- (Italy) Carlo Finetti

Assistant coach(es)

- (Italy) Gabriele Grazzini
- (Germany) Johannes Hübner
- (United States) Shy Ely

Legend

- (C) Team captain
- Injured

- Roster
Updated: November 16, 2026

=== Depth chart ===
Pos.	Starting 5	Bench 1	Bench 2
C		Marcel Keßen
PF	Paul Zipser	Dusan Neskovic
SF	Marcus Weathers	Samuell Williamson
SG		Andrew O'Brien	Erol Ersek
PG	DJ Horne	Kevin McClain	Niklas Würzner

=== Retired numbers ===
MLP Academics Heidelberg retired numbers
No	Nat.	Player	Position	Tenure	Date retired	Ref
5	(United States)	Shyron Ely	SG	2013–2014, 2015–2023	29 July 2023	

=== Notable players ===
To appear in this section a player must have played at least two seasons for the club AND either:

– Set a club record or won an individual award as a professional player.
– Played at least one official international match for his senior national team at any time.

- (Germany) Danilo Barthel
- (Germany) Bennet Hundt
- (Germany) Dietrich Keller
- (Germany) Uwe Sauer
- (Germany) Akeem Vargas
- (Germany) Klaus Weinand
- (Germany) Paul Zipser
- (Belgium) Vincent Kesteloot
- (Belgium) Elias Lasisi
- (Czechoslovak Socialist Republic) Jiri Stastny
- (United States) (Croatia) Jaleen Smith
- (United States) Tim Coleman
- (United States) Shy Ely
- (United States) Kelvin Martin

== Trophies ==
- German Championship / Basketball Bundesliga

Champions: 1956–57, 1957–58, 1958–59, 1959–60, 1960–61, 1961–62, 1965–66, 1972–73, 1976–77
Runners-up: 1950, 1956, 1957, 1958, 1974, 1975, 1978

- BBL-Pokal

Winners: 1977, 1978
Runners-up: 1975

- 2. Basketball Bundesliga (II)

Champions: 1981, 1983

- ProA (II)

Champions: 2020–21

== Season by season ==
Season	Tier	League	Pos.	German Cup	European competitions	
2021–22	1	Bundesliga	15th			
2022–23	1	Bundesliga	12th	Quarterfinals		
2023–24	1	Bundesliga	16th	Round of 16		
2024–25	1	Bundesliga	3rd	Quarterfinals		
2025–26	1	Bundesliga	18th	Quarterfinals	3 Champions League	Play-ins
2026–27	1	Bundesliga		First round		

== Head coaches ==
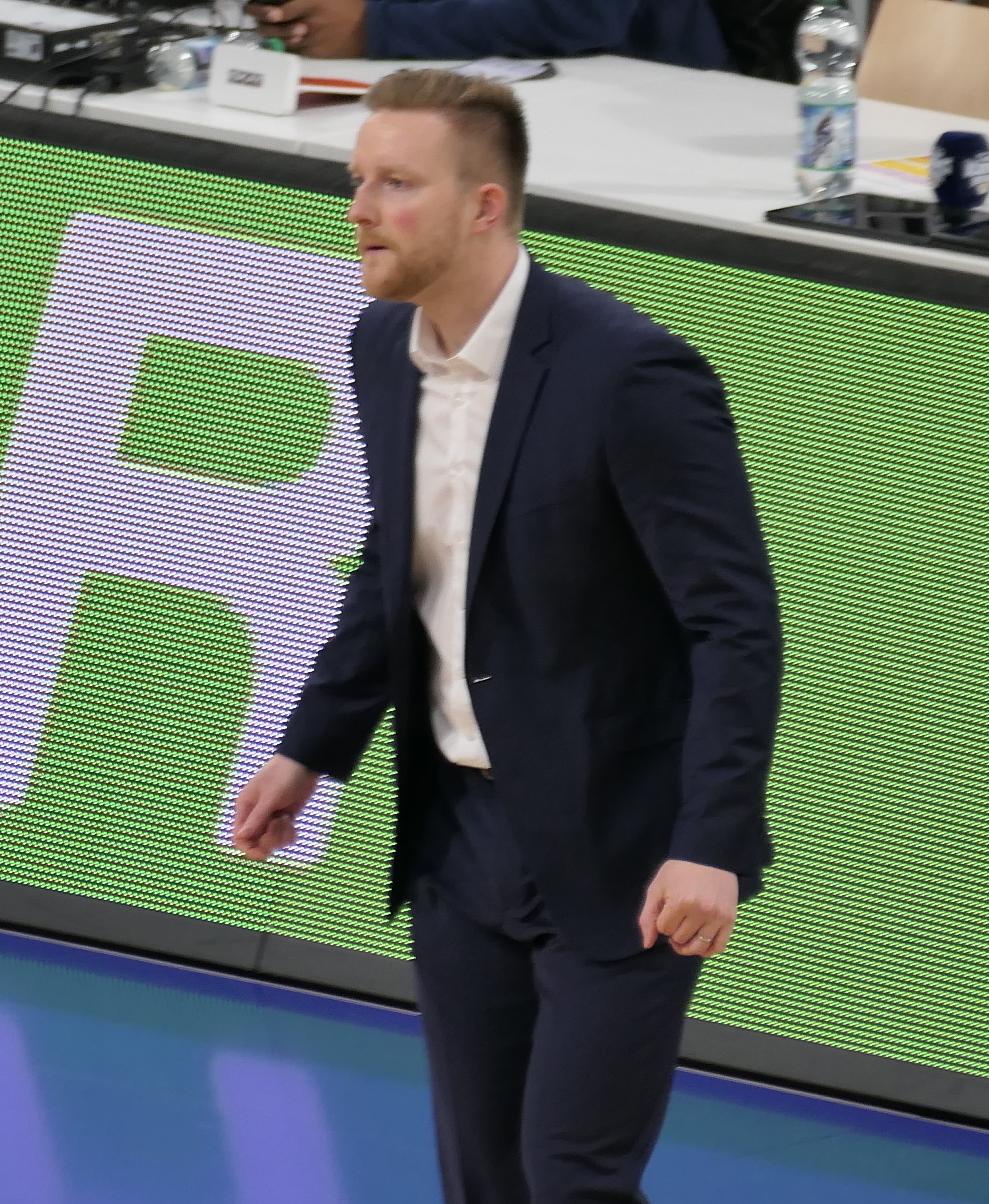
Iisalo in March 2023.

- (Germany) Anton Kartak (1956–1960) (National Champion 1957–60)
- (Germany) Kurt Siebenhaar (1960–1961) (National Champion 1961)
- (Germany) Oskar Roth (1961–1963) (National Champion 1962)
- (Germany) Theodor Schober (1964)
- (Germany) Kurt Siebenhaar (1965–1968) (National Champion 1966)
- (Germany) Hannes Neumann (1968–1971)
- (Germany) Volker Heindel (1972)
- (United States) Dick Stewart (1972–1973) (National Champion 1973)
- (Germany) Hans Leciejewski (1973–1974)
- (United States) Dick Stewart (1974)
- (Germany) Hans Leciejewski (1975–1977) (National Champion 1977)
- (Germany) Roland Geggus (1977–1980)
- (Germany) Hans Leciejewski (1980–1985)
- (Germany) Dietrich Keller (1985–1987)
- (United States) Thomas Benson (1987–1988)
- (Germany) Thomas Riedel (1988–1990)
- (Czechoslovak Socialist Republic) Eugen Tallo (1990–1991)
- (Germany) Thomas Riedel (1991–1994)
- (Germany) Thomas Dröll (1994–1995)
- (Germany) Jochen Knell (1995–1999)
- (Germany) Achim Waßong (1999–2000)
- (Germany) Harald Rupp (2000)
- (Germany) Markus Jochum (2000–2007)
- (Germany) Torsten Daume (2008–2011)
- (Germany) Uwe Sauer (2011–2012)
- (United Kingdom) Anthony Garbelotto (2012–2014)
- (Serbia) Branislav Ignjatovic (2014–2022)
- (Finland) Joonas Iisalo (2022–2024)
- (Germany) Ingo Freyer (2024)
- (Finland) Daniel Jansson (2024–present)
