= Dietrich Keller =

German basketball player (born 1943)

Personal information
- Born: 18 October 1943 (age 81); Mainz, Germany

Career history
- 1972–1977: USC Heidelberg

Dietrich Keller (born 18 October 1943) is a former German basketball player and coach. He competed in the men's tournament at the 1972 Summer Olympics.
