= Kevin McClain =

American basketball player

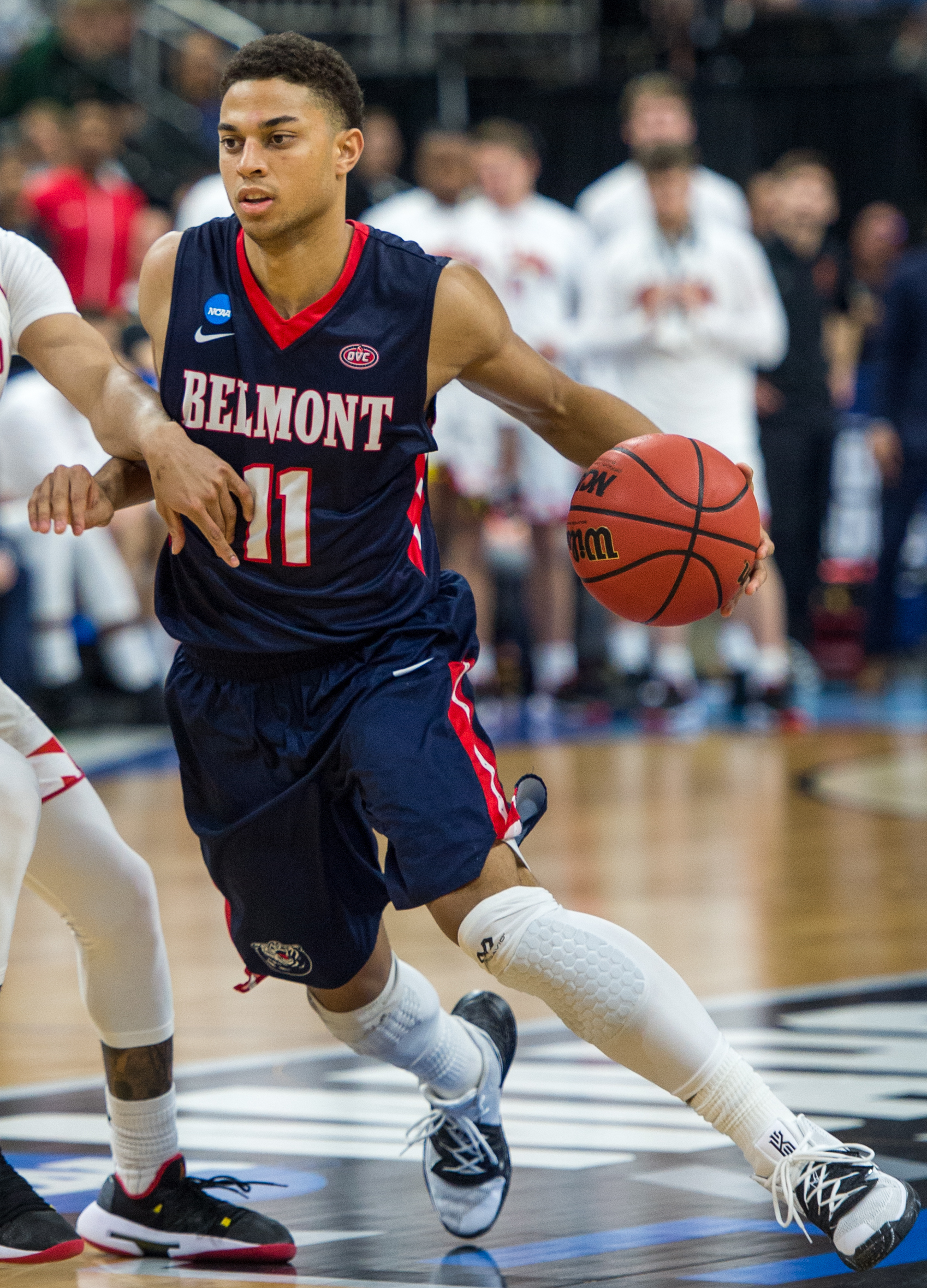

No. 3 – MLP Academics Heidelberg
- Position: Point guard
- League: ProA

Personal information
- Born: October 21, 1996 (age 30)
- Listed height: 6 ft 3 in (1.91 m)
- Listed weight: 180 lb (82 kg)

Career information
- High school: Hamilton County (Jennings, Florida)
- College: Belmont (2015–2019)
- NBA draft: 2019: undrafted
- Playing career: 2019–present

Career history
- 2019–2020: EWE Baskets Oldenburg
- 2020–2023: Fos Provence Basket
- 2023–2024: Skyliners Frankfurt
- 2024–2025: Giessen 46ers
- 2025–present: MLP Academics Heidelberg

Career highlights
- LNB Pro B champion (2021); First-team All-OVC (2019)

Kevin Michael McClain (born October 21, 1996) is an American professional basketball player for MLP Academics Heidelberg of the ProA. He played college basketball for the Belmont Bruins.

== High school career ==
McClain attended Hamilton County High School, where he was coached by Patrick Murphy. McClain signed with Belmont on April 15, 2015. He chose the Bruins over offers from St. Bonaventure University and the University of North Carolina at Asheville.

== College career ==
As a freshman, McClain averaged 5.4 points and 1.3 rebounds per game. As a sophomore, McClain posted 4.6 points, 1.3 rebounds, and 1.1 assists per game. McClain averaged 12.6 points, 3.8 rebounds and 2.1 assists per game as a junior, his first season as a starter. As a senior, McClain averaged 16.8 points, 3.6 rebounds and 3.9 assists per game and was named to the All-OVC First Team. He scored 27 points at Southeast Missouri State on March 2, 2019, to lead Belmont to an Ohio Valley Conference regular season title. In the NCAA Tournament, McClain posted 29 points against Temple, leading Belmont to an 81–70 victory. He finished 11th on Belmont's NCAA Division I era career scoring list with 1,279 points.

== Professional career ==
After going undrafted in 2019, McClain signed with the Golden State Warriors for the Summer League. On July 3, 2019, he signed with EWE Baskets Oldenburg of the German Basketball Bundesliga. McClain has ties to Germany, as his mother was born there and his grandmother lives in the country. On August 11, 2020, he signed with Fos Provence Basket of the LNB Pro A.

On October 30, 2023, McClain joined the Rip City Remix of the NBA G League, but was waived on November 7.

On June 18, 2025, he signed with MLP Academics Heidelberg of the Basketball Bundesliga (BBL).
