= Willie Young (basketball) =

American basketball player and coach

Personal information
- Born: June 15, 1973 (age 53)

Career information
- NBA draft: 1998: undrafted
- Playing career: 1998–2008
- Position: Head coach
- Coaching career: 2008–present

Career history

Playing
- 1998: Den Helder
- 1999–2000: EBBC Den Bosch
- 2000–2001: Landstede Zwolle
- 2001–2003: Lich Basket
- 2003–2008: Crailsheim Merlins

Coaching
- 2008–2012: Crailsheim Merlins (youth)
- 2012–2014: Crailsheim Merlins
- 2017–2019: Sequatchie County High School
- 2020–2021: Pajaro Valley High School

Career highlights
- As player: Dutch League champion (1998)

Willie Montrel Young (born June 15, 1973) is an American professional basketball coach and former professional basketball player.

== Career ==
Young graduated from Norview High School in 1992, before playing college basketball at Brevard Community College (1992–95) and at the University of Tennessee at Chattanooga (1995–97). As a senior, he was the Mocs second-leading scorer (14.0ppg) and helped the team reach the 1997 NCAA Sweet Sixteen.

He turned professional in 1998 and spent nine years playing overseas in the Netherlands, Israel, Belgium and Germany. As a rookie, Young helped BV Den Helder win the Dutch national championship. Young, who spent the last three years of his playing days with the Crailsheim Merlins in Germany's second-tier league 2. Bundesliga, suffered a career-ending knee injury in February 2007.

In 2008, Young began his coaching career as head coach of Crailsheim's development squad, while also coaching in the club's youth ranks. In August 2012, Young was promoted to the head coaching position at Crailsheim's first team in the ProA league. In 2014, he guided the Merlins to a second-place finish in the ProA regular season and to an appearance in the finals, which earned his team promotion to Germany's top-flight Basketball Bundesliga. He was sacked in November 2014 after a 1–8 season start.

In August 2017, he was hired as head basketball coach for the Sequatchie County High School Indians in Dunlap, Tennessee. Young worked there until 2019, in September 2020, he was appointed as boys basketball coach at Pajaro Valley High School in Watsonville, California. Young coached the Pajaro Valley Grizzlies in the 2020–21 season.
