= Jiří Šťastný =

Czech basketball player

Personal information
- Born: 13 December 1938 (age 87) Prague, Czechoslovakia

Career history
- USC Heidelberg

Jiří Šťastný (born 13 December 1938) is a Czech basketball player. He competed in the men's tournament at the 1960 Summer Olympics.
