= Lucas Mayer (basketball) =

German basketball player (born 1999)

No. 8 – Crailsheim Merlins
- Position: Point guard
- League: ProA

Personal information
- Born: 30 August 1999 (age 27) Gießen, Germany
- Listed height: 1.85 m (6 ft 1 in)

Career information
- Playing career: 2016–present

Career history
- 2020–2022: EPG Baskets Koblenz
- 2022–2023: Leitershofen/Stadtbergen
- 2023–2024: Paderborn Baskets
- 2024–2026: Kirchheim Knights
- 2026–present: Crailsheim Merlins

Lucas Mayer (born 30 August 1999) is a German professional basketball player for Crailsheim Merlins of the German ProA league. He has previously played for Paderborn Baskets and VfL Kirchheim Knights as well.

== Playing career ==
For the 2022–23 season, he played for BG Leitershofen/Stadtbergen (Augsburg area).

In the summer of 2023, he joined Paderborn Baskets.
