= Daniel Jansson =

Finnish basketball coach (born 1979)

Personal information
- Born: 11 June 1979 (age 47) Sollentuna, Sweden
- Listed height: 1.80 m (5 ft 11 in)

Career information
- College: Lakeland University
- Playing career: 1998–2007
- Position: Head coach
- Coaching career: 2007–present

Career history

Playing
- 1998–1999: Pussihukat
- 2005–2006: Porvoon Tarmo
- 2006–2007: Pussihukat

Coaching
- 2007–2008: Pussihukat (assistant)
- 2014–2017: Weißenhorn Youngstars
- 2017–2019: OrangeAcademy
- 2019–2020: Ratiopharm Ulm (assistant)
- 2020–2024: Tigers Tübingen
- 2024–2025: Finland (assistant)
- 2024–2026: USC Heidelberg

Career highlights
- As head coach: German ProA Champion (2022); German ProB Champion (2017); 2x ProA Coach of the Year (2022, 2023); NBBL Coach of the Year (2016)

Daniel Jansson (born 11 June 1979) is a Finnish basketball coach and a former player. He most recently worked as the head coach of German Bundesliga team USC Heidelberg.

== Early life ==
Jansson was born in Sollentuna, Sweden to Finnish mother and Swedish father. He is of Lebanese descent on his father's side. Jansson moved to Finland at the age of three, when his parents divorced.

== Playing career ==
Jansson started playing basketball in Kouvola and played in the youth teams of Kouvot. He played briefly in the men's premier division in 1998–99 season, and played in under-16 and under-18 youth national teams. After that, he spent four years in the United States studying and playing basketball. He also played in the Netherlands and Belgium, and graduated as MBA in the Maastricht University. He returned to Finland and played in the highest tier Korisliiga first with Porvoon Tarmo and last with Pussihukat, and ended his playing career at the age of 27, focusing more on coaching.

== Coaching career ==
Jansson started his coaching career in Vantaa with Pussihukat, the club he had played for before. He also coached the Finland U16 national team.

=== Ratiopharm Ulm ===
In 2014, Jansson moved to Germany and was appointed as a youth coach for Ratiopharm Ulm youth academy teams. In 2016, when coaching the Ulm U19 academy team in the NBBL, he was named the coach of the year in the league. He also led Weißenhorn Youngstars, the development team of Ulm, to ProB championship, and to win a promotion to ProA in 2017.

During 2019–2020, Jansson was the assistant coach of the Ratiopharm Ulm first team in Bundesliga.

=== Tigers Tübingen ===
In 2020, Jansson signed with Tigers Tübingen for the head coach position, competing in ProA. In March 2021, he extended his contract with the club until the summer 2023. He led the club to win ProA championship and to earn the promotion in 2022, but the club surrendered the league license for financial reasons. In 2023, Tübingen finished 2nd in the league and won the promotion again, and this time they were promoted to the Basketball Bundesliga. Jansson was named The Coach of the Year in ProA consecutively in 2022 and 2023.

In the summer 2023, Jansson was named the head coach, alongside Anton Mirolybov, of the Finland Universiade team, for the postponed 2021 Summer World University Games in Chengdu, China.

On 20 December 2023, Jansson renewed his contract with Tübingen, on a deal until the end of the 2024–25 season. The 2023-24 Bundesliga season ended in relegation for Jansson and his Tübingen outfit.

=== USC Heidelberg ===
In May 2024, he invoked a release clause to leave Tübingen and to sign with German Bundesliga side USC Heidelberg. Jansson led Heidelberg to the Bundesliga play-offs reaching the semi-finals against Bayern Munich.

=== Finland (assistant) ===
In May 2024, Jansson joined also the coaching staff of the Finland national team as an assistant coach.
