= Philipp Heyden =

German basketball player (born 1988)

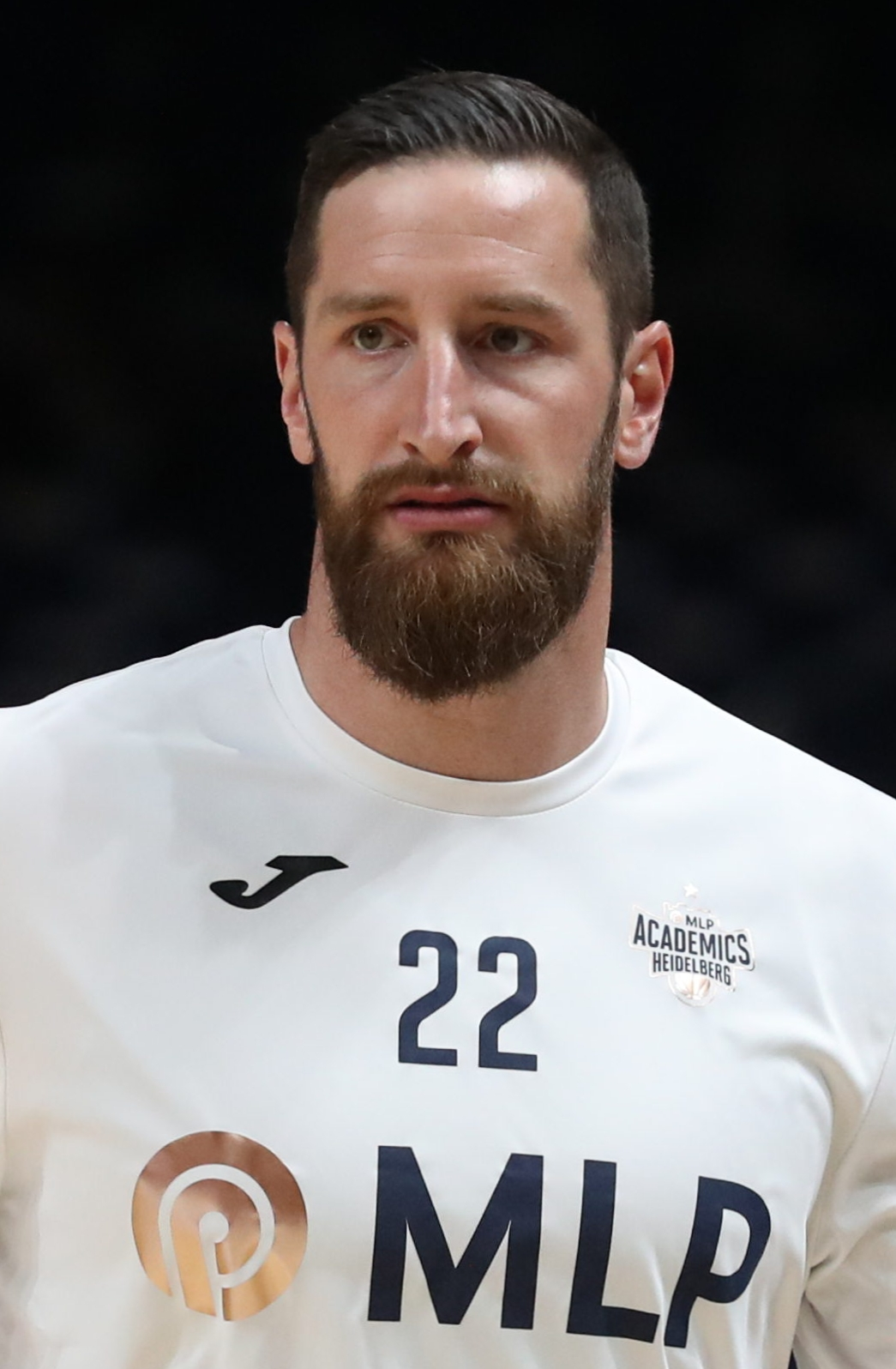
- Heyden playing for Heidelberg in 2022

Retired
- Position: Center

Personal information
- Born: September 26, 1988 (age 37) Marbach am Neckar, Germany
- Listed height: 6 ft 9 in (2.06 m)

Career information
- Playing career: 2005–present

Career history
- 2006–2008: TuS Lichterfelde
- 2008–2010: Ludwigsburg
- 2008–2010: →Kirchheim Knights
- 2010–2011: Bayreuth
- 2011–2013: Mitteldeutscher BC
- 2013–2016: Bayreuth
- 2016–2017: MLP Academics Heidelberg
- 2017–2018: Tigers Tübingen
- 2018–2022: MLP Academics Heidelberg

Philipp Heyden (born 26 September 1988) is a former German professional basketball player who last played for Academics Heidelberg of the Basketball Bundesliga.
