= DaVonté Lacy =

American basketball player

Free agent
- Position: Shooting guard

Personal information
- Born: March 11, 1993 (age 33) Tacoma, Washington
- Listed height: 6 ft 4 in (1.93 m)
- Listed weight: 210 lb (95 kg)

Career information
- High school: Curtis (University Place, Washington)
- College: Washington State (2011–2015)
- NBA draft: 2015: undrafted
- Playing career: 2015–present

Career history
- 2015–2016: Güssing Knights
- 2016: Vienna
- 2017–2018: Ehingen Urspring
- 2018–2019: PS Karlsruhe Lions
- 2019: Merkezefendi
- 2020: USC Heidelberg
- 2020–2021: Donar
- 2021–2022: Patrioti Levice
- 2022: Medipolis SC Jena
- 2022: Bashkimi Prizren
- 2022–2023: Ionikos Nikaias

Career highlights
- First-team All-Pac-12 (2015)

DaVonté Damion Lacy (born March 11, 1993) is an American professional basketball player who last played for Ionikos Nikaias of the Greek Basket League. Standing at 6 ft 4 in (1.93 m), he plays at the shooting guard position.

== College career ==
Lacy attended Washington State for four years. As a junior, Lacy averaged 19.4 points per game, which included a career-high 39-point game against California. As a senior, he averaged 16.9 points, 2.6 rebounds, 2.1 assists and a steal per game. He was named to the First Team All-Pac-12 Conference.

== Professional career ==
Lacy began his professional career in Austria with Güssing Knights. During the 2019–20 season, Lacy played four games for Merkezefendi and 11 games for USC Heidelberg. He averaged 18.7 points, 3.8 rebounds, 2.9 assists and 1.1 steals per game for Heidelberg.

On May 2, 2020, Lacy signed with Donar in the Netherlands for the 2020–21 season.

On July 22, 2021, Lacy signed with Patrioti Levice in the Slovak Basketball League. He averaged 17.1 points, 3.6 rebounds, 4.2 assists and 1.5 steals per game. On January 15, 2022, Lacy signed with Medipolis SC Jena of the German ProA.

Lacy signed a deal with Bashkimi Prizren from Kosovo in August 2022. On September 20, 2022, he moved to Greek club Ionikos Nikaias. In 22 league games, he averaged 8.5 points, 1.9 rebounds and 1.7 assists, playing around 24 minutes per contest.
