= Ingo Freyer =

German basketball player and coach

- Freyer with Heidelberg in 2024

Personal information
- Born: 7 February 1971 (age 55) Wolfsburg, West Germany
- Listed height: 6 ft 5 in (1.96 m)

Career information
- Playing career: 1989–2004
- Position: Shooting guard
- Coaching career: 2004–present

Career history

Playing
- –1991: SC Rist Wedel
- 1991–1995: Alba Berlin
- 1995–1997: Brandt Hagen
- 1997: JuveCaserta Basket
- 1998: SSV Ulm
- 1998–2001: Mitteldeutscher BC
- 2001–2002: BG Ludwigsburg
- 2002–2003: TSV Quakenbrück
- 2003–2004: Eisbären Bremerhaven

Coaching
- 2004–2007: SC Rist Wedel
- 2007–2016: Phoenix Hagen
- 2017–2020: Gießen 46ers
- 2022: EWE Baskets Oldenburg
- 2023: Mitteldeutscher BC
- 2024: MLP Academics Heidelberg

Ingo Freyer is a German professional basketball coach and former national team player.

== Professional career ==
=== As player ===
Freyer earned 39 caps for the German men's national team. He participated in the 1995 European Championships. At the club level, he won the 1994–95 FIBA Korać Cup with Alba Berlin. Later in his career, he sealed promotion to the German Basketball Bundesliga three times (with SSV Weißenfels, Ludwigsburg and Quakenbrück).

=== As coach ===
Freyer led Phoenix Hagen to promotion to the German top-tier Basketball Bundesliga in 2009. In November 2016, Hagen had its Bundesliga license revoked, Freyer left the team.

Freyer's high-intensity and fast-paced style of play became his trademark.

In 2022 (Baskets Oldenburg), 2023 (Mitteldeutscher BC) and 2024 (MLP Academics Heidelberg), Freyer saved Bundesliga teams from relegation.

== Miscellaneous ==
In the past, Freyer was a commentary for Eurosport.
