= Jussi Laakso =

Finnish basketball coach (born 1976)

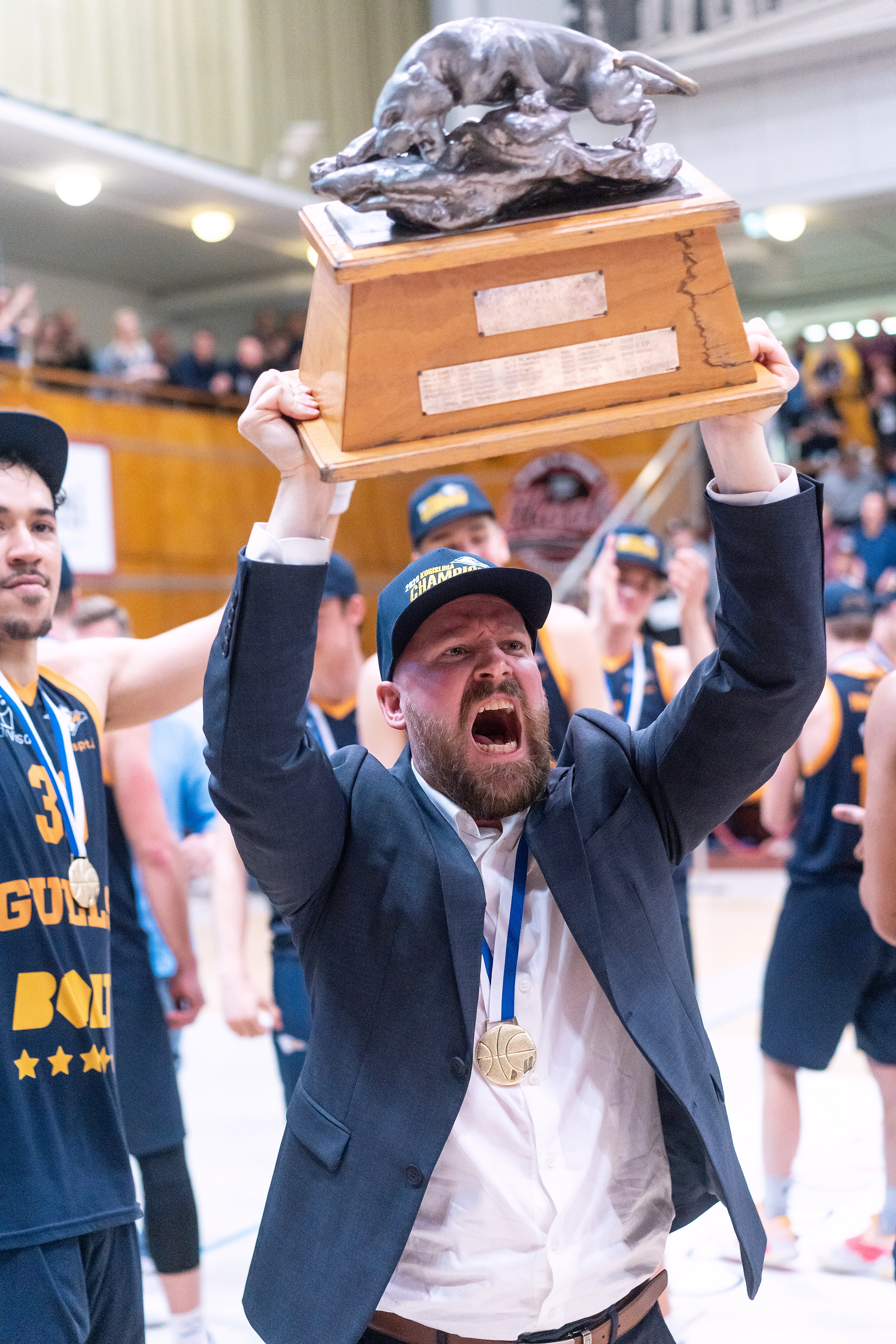
- Laakso after winning the 2023 Finnish Championship with Helsinki Seagulls

ToPoLa
- Position: Head coach

Personal information
- Born: 12 June 1976 (age 50) Riihimäki, Finland
- Coaching career: 1998–present

Career history

Coaching
- 1998–2001: BC Nokia (youth)
- 2001–2002: Lappeenrannan NMKY
- 2002–2004: Catz Lappeenranta (women)
- 2004–2008: NMKY Helsinki (women)
- 2008–2009: Honka Akatemia (women)
- 2013–2014: Tapiolan Honka (women)
- 2014–2015: Tapiolan Honka (youth)
- 2015–2017: Kauhajoki Karhu (assistant)
- 2017–2019: Kauhajoki Karhu
- 2019–2023: Helsinki Seagulls
- 2023–2024: Crailsheim Merlins
- 2024–present: ToPoLa

Career highlights
- As head coach: 3x Finnish Korisliiga champion: (2018, 2019, 2023); 2x Korisliiga Coach of the Year: (2018, 2023); 3x Finnish Cup champion: (2020–2022)

Jussi Tapani Laakso (born 12 June 1976) is a Finnish professional basketball coach, currently working as the head coach of ToPoLa.

During his career, which has run for 25 years, he has successfully coached girls', women's, boys' and men's teams.

== Coaching career ==
In the beginning of his coaching career, Laakso worked as a youth coach in BC Nokia, and as a coach of Lappeenrannan NMKY and Catz Lappeenranta, before moving to Helsinki area and working as a head coach of women's teams of NMKY Helsinki, Honka Akatemia and Tapiolan Honka.

=== Karhu Basket Kauhajoki ===
On 20 May 2015, Laakso was named an assistant coach of Karhu Basket in Kauhajoki. He was named the head coach of the club on 4 February 2017. Laakso led Karhu Basket to win two Finnish championship titles in 2018 and 2019. He was named The Korisliiga Coach of the Year in 2018.

=== Helsinki Seagulls ===
Laakso started working as the head coach of Helsinki Seagulls in the summer 2019. In February 2023, it was reported that he will depart the club after the ongoing season. His last season with Seagulls ultimately ended in winning the Finnish championship title in 2023.

During his four years with the club, Laakso also led Seagulls to win three Finnish Cups in a row, in 2020, 2021 and 2022. Seagulls also won the bronze medal in the league twice, in 2021 and 2022. After the season in 2023, he was named The Korisliiga Coach of the Year again.

=== Crailsheim Merlins ===
After his tenure with Seagulls, Laakso briefly worked in the coaching staff of Finland women's national basketball team, before being appointed as the new head coach of German Bundesliga team Crailsheim Merlins in November 2023.
