= Niklas Forsmoo =

Swedish handball player (born 1983)

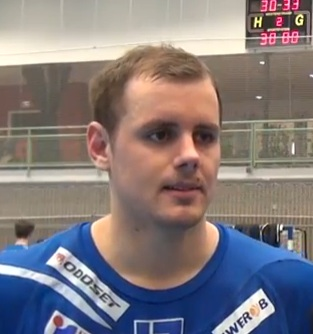
- Forsmoo in 2012

Personal information
- Full name: Niklas Forsmoo
- Nationality: Swedish (Sweden)
- Born: 9 April 1983 (age 43) Stockholm, Sweden
- Height: 190 cm (75 in)

Sport
- Sport: Handball
- Position: Right back
- Current club: Retired

Youth career
- Years: Team
- –: HV Tidaholm
- –: IFK Skövde

Senior clubs
- Years: Team
- –2005: IFK Skövde
- 2005–2008: Team Tvis Holstebro
- 2008–2010: Lugi HF
- 2010–2012: IFK Skövde
- 2012–2014: HV Tidaholm
- 2014–2015: HK Country
National team
Years	Team	Apps	(Gls)
2006–2007	Sweden	5	(7)

Niklas Forsmoo (born 9 April 1983) is a Swedish former handball player.

He started playing handball at HV Tidaholm, before joining Swedish Elitserien club IFK Skövde, with whom he won the EHF Challenge Cup in 2004. He then joined Danish team Team Tvis Holstebro, followed by Lugi HF and a return to IFK Skövde.

He then returned to HV Tidaholm as player-coach, before playing for HK Country. In 2015 he was forced to retire due to injuries.

Forsmoo has made 5 appearances for the Swedish national handball team.
