= Niklas Würzner =

German basketball player (born 1994)

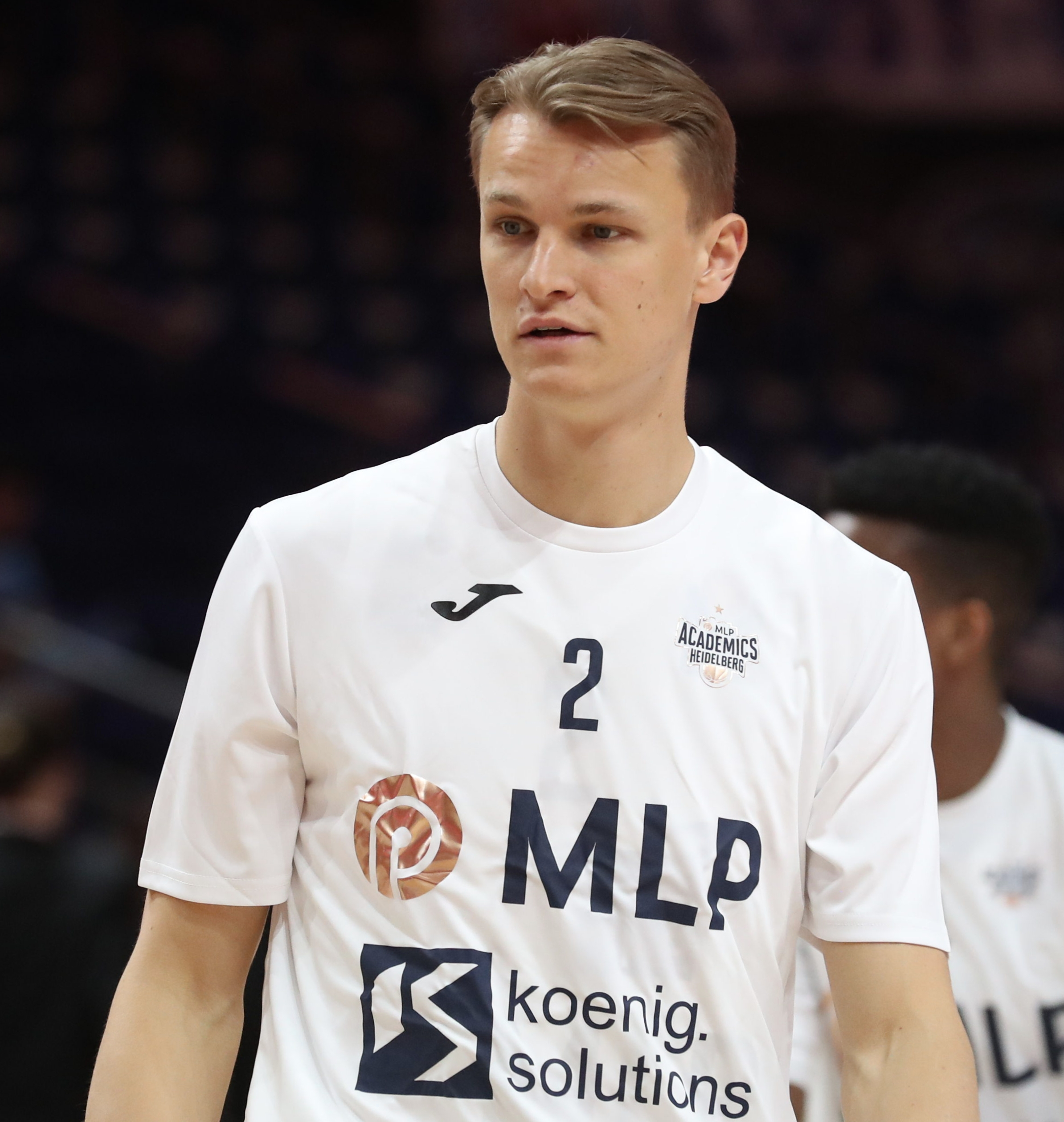

No. 2 – MLP Academics Heidelberg
- Position: Point guard
- League: ProA

Personal information
- Born: February 2, 1994 (age 32) Heidelberg, Germany
- Listed height: 6 ft 5 in (1.96 m)
- Listed weight: 187 lb (85 kg)

Career information
- Playing career: 2012–present

Career history
- 2013-present: MLP Academics Heidelberg

Career highlights
- German 3x3 national team

Niklas Würzner (alternative spelling Wuerzner; born 2 February 1994) is a German professional basketball player for MLP Academics Heidelberg of the ProA.

== Personal ==
Niklas is the son of Eckart Würzner, mayor of the city of Heidelberg.
