= Will Moreton =

American basketball player

Personal information
- Born: December 5, 1997 (age 28) Chicago, Illinois
- Listed height: 6 ft 6 in (1.98 m)
- Listed weight: 195 lb (88 kg)

Career information
- High school: Edina High School (Edina, Minnesota)
- College: Stonehill (2016–2020)
- Playing career: 2020–2022
- Position: Small forward
- Number: 21

Career history
- 2020–2021: Donar Groningen
- 2021–2022: Albacete

Career highlights
- NE-10 Player of the Year (2020); NE-10 All-First Team (2020); 2× NE-10 All-Second Team (2020)

Will Moreton (born December 5, 1997) is an American former basketball player, who last played for Albacete of the Spanish LEB Plata.

== College career ==
Moreton played four seasons for the Stonehill Skyhawks in the Northeast-10 Conference. In 2020, Moreton was named the NE-10 Player of the Year. He became the first Skyhawks player in 22 years to win the award. He averaged 18.9 points and 8.9 rebounds per game as a senior. Moreton finished his career with 1,841 points.

== Professional career ==
On June 24, 2020, Moreton signed his first professional contract with Donar of the Dutch Basketball League. He averaged 7.5 points in the DBL, helping Donar to a semi-final appearance.

In the summer of 2021, Will helped his team win the Twin City Pro-Am (Minneapolis & St Paul).

On September 15, 2021, Moreton signed with the Spanish club Albacete Basket of the LEB Plata. Moreton led Albacete in scoring with 14.7 points per game en route to the club’s promotion to LEB Oro.
