= Joonas Iisalo =

Finnish basketball coach and former player

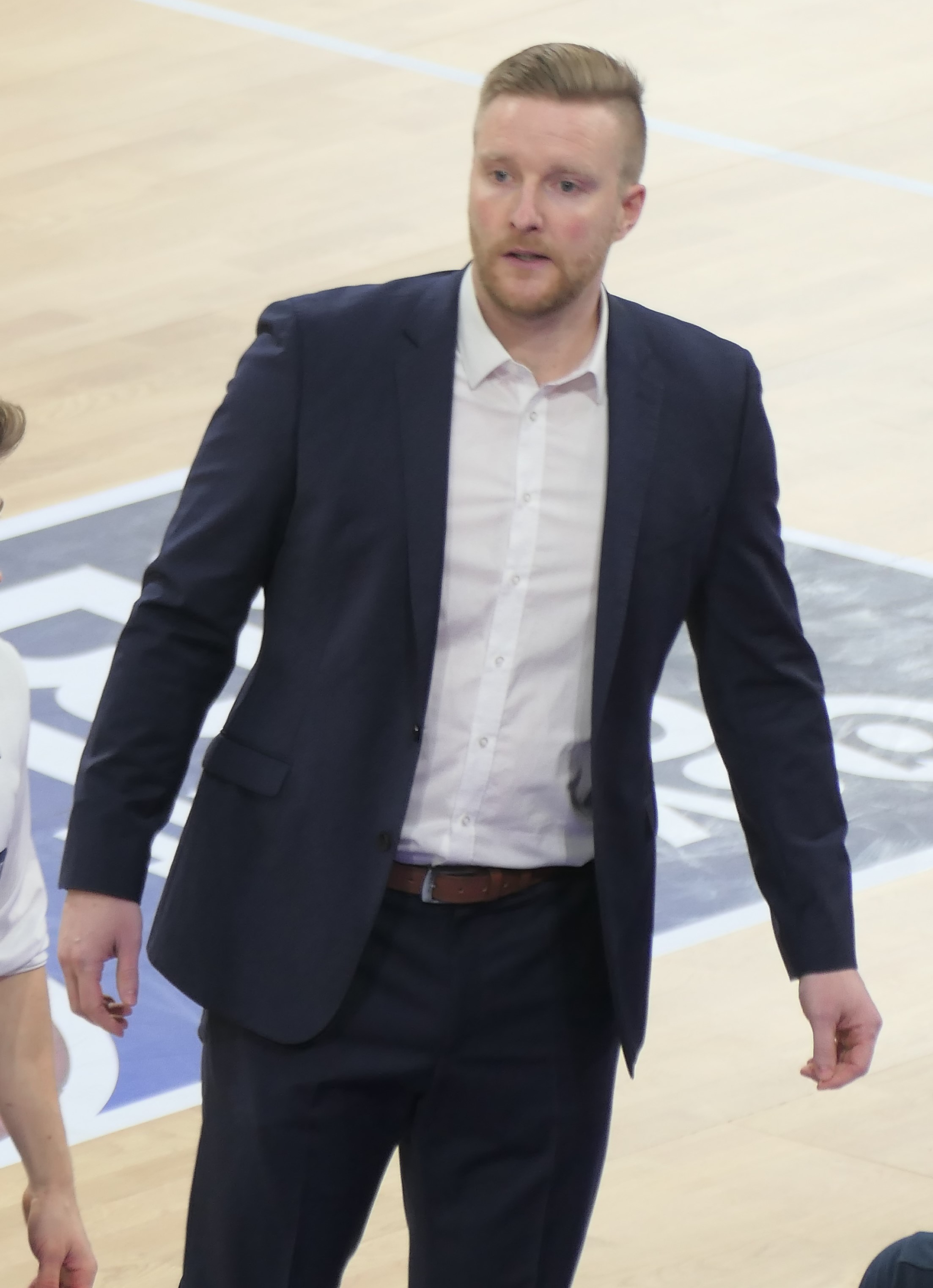
- Iisalo in 2023 with Heidelberg

Finland national team
- Title: Assistant coach

Personal information
- Born: 5 January 1986 (age 40) Berlin, Germany
- Listed height: 190 cm (6 ft 3 in)

Career information
- Playing career: 2002–2004
- Position: Shooting guard
- Coaching career: 2005–present

Career history

Playing
- 2002–2004: Kouvot

Coaching
- 2005–2009: Tapiolan Honka (youth)
- 2009–2010: Espoo Basket Team (youth)
- 2010–2011: Espoon Honka (assistant)
- 2012–2013: Karkkilan Urheilijat
- 2013–2015: Bisons Loimaa (assistant)
- 2015–2016: Forssan Koripojat
- 2016–2019: Salon Vilpas
- 2019–2021: Crailsheim Merlins (associate hc)
- 2021–2022: Telekom Baskets Bonn (associate hc)
- 2022–2024: USC Heidelberg
- 2025–present: Finland (assistant)

Career highlights
- As head coach: Finnish Cup winner: 2019

Joonas Iisalo (born 5 January 1986) is a Finnish basketball coach and former player. He is currently an assistant coach of the Finland national team.

Standing at 1.90 m (6 ft 3 in), Iisalo played as shooting guard during his playing career. He capped for Finnish youth national teams on many occasions.

== Early life ==
Joonas Iisalo's father worked as a foreign correspondent in East Berlin in the 1980s.

Both Joonas and his older brother Tuomas later became professional basketball coaches. Their sister Meri Valkama became a journalist who won the 2021 prize for best debut novel in Finland with her book "Sinun, Margot" where she describes the story of the Iisalo family.

== Coaching career ==
Joonas coached as an associate head coach to his brother Tuomas for the Crailsheim Merlins and for the Telekom Baskets Bonn. For the 2022–23 season, he switched teams to become head coach of the Bundesliga competitor MLP Academics Heidelberg. On 27 September 2023, he extended his contract with Heidelberg, signing a deal until the end of 2025–26 season.

In October 2025, it was announced that Iisalo would join the coaching staff of the Finland national team, to replace Hanno Möttölä.

== Coaching style ==
According to reports, the Iisalo style has been based on pace, many three-point shots and strong offensive rebounding.

== Personal ==
Joonas Iisalo is married and has three children. In October 2025, he revealed they are expecting their fourth child.
