= Niklas Nüssle =

German politician (born 1994)

Member of the Landtag of Baden-Württemberg
- Incumbent
- Assumed office 11 May 2021
- Constituency: Waldshut (2021–2026)

Personal details
- Born: 12 July 1994 (age 31)
- Party: Alliance 90/The Greens (since 2016)

Niklas Nüssle (born 12 July 1994) is a German politician serving as a member of the Landtag of Baden-Württemberg since 2021. From 2017 to 2022, he served as chairman of Alliance 90/The Greens in Waldshut.
