= Jarred Ogungbemi-Jackson =

Canadian-Jamaican basketball player

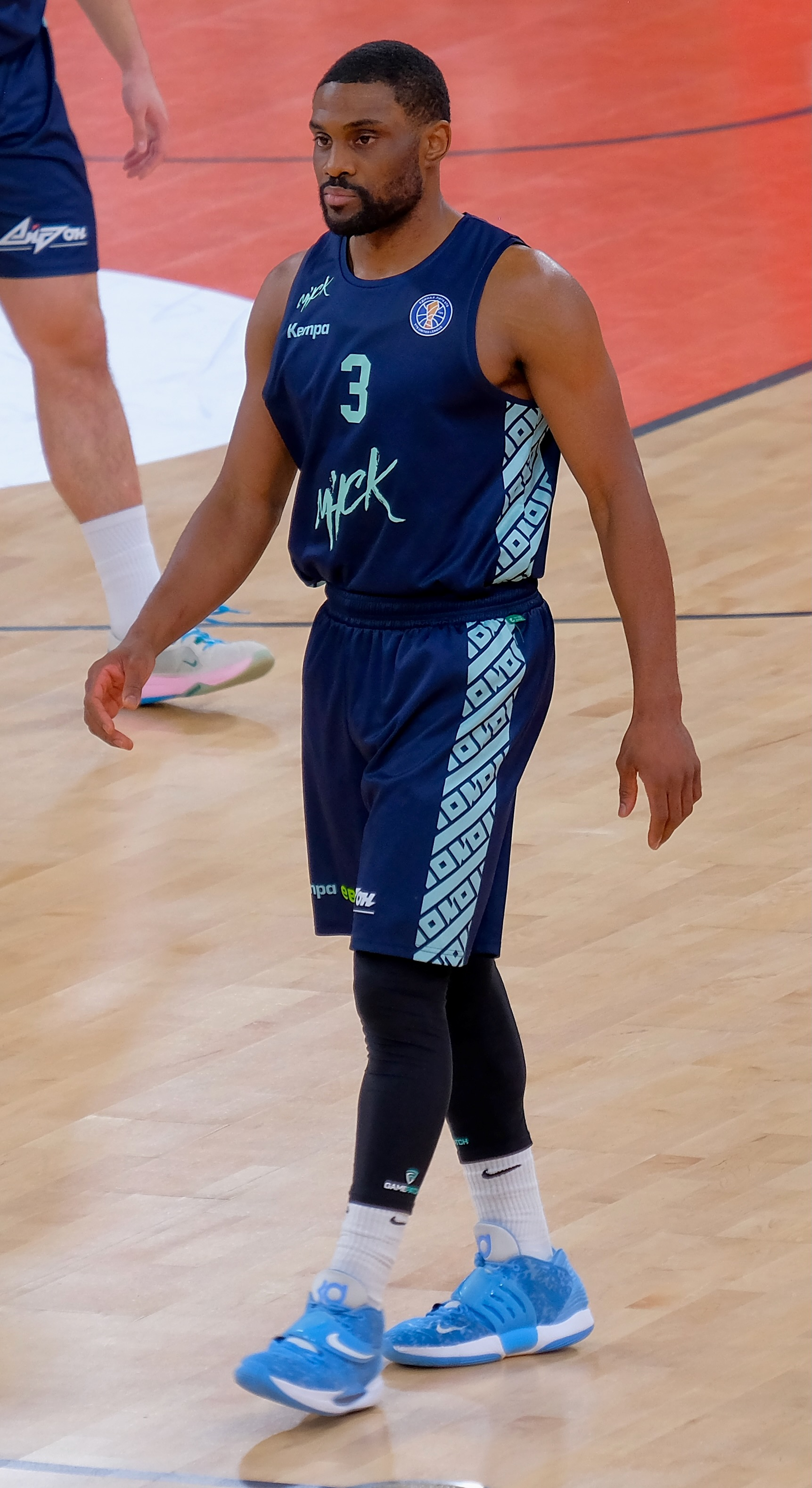

Free Agent
- Position: Point guard

Personal information
- Born: August 11, 1991 (age 35) Winnipeg, Manitoba, Canada
- Listed height: 5 ft 10 in (1.78 m)
- Listed weight: 209 lb (95 kg)

Career information
- High school: Garden City Collegiate (Winnipeg, Manitoba)
- College: Calgary (2009–2010)
- NBA draft: 2013: undrafted
- Playing career: 2015–present

Career history
- 2015–2017: Galitos Barreiro Tley
- 2017–2018: Força Lleida
- 2018–2019: Aix-les-Bains
- 2019–2020: Kataja
- 2020–2021: Donar
- 2021–2022: Bakken Bears
- 2022–2023: Orléans Loiret
- 2023–2024: BC Minsk
- 2024: Winnipeg Sea Bears
- 2024–2025: Riesen Ludwigsburg

Career highlights
- Bundesliga Top Scorer (2025); All-DBL Team (2021)

Jarred Abiona Ogungbemi-Jackson (born August 11, 1991) is a Canadian-Jamaican professional basketball player who played in Portugal, Spain, France, Finland, Denmark, the Netherlands, Belarus, and Germany, as well as Winnipeg, his hometown. He last played for Riesen Ludwigsburg of the Basketball Bundesliga.

== High school and college career ==
Ogungbemi-Jackson played high school basketball for Garden City Collegiate in Winnipeg. He was named Manitoba's most outstanding high school player in Grade 11 and Grade 12. He scored 34 points in the Manitoba province championship game and was named MVP.

He played five seasons of U Sports basketball for the Calgary Dinos. At the end of his time with the Dinos, he was 3rd all time in points scored, and 1st all time in steals in school history.

== Professional career ==
Ogungbemi-Jackson started his career in 2015 with Galitos F.C. in the Portuguese first-level LPB. In his rookie year he averaged 14.8 points and 3.7 assists in 30 games aiding his team to a 17-13 record.

In 2016-2017, his second season with Galitos F.C., he improved his stats to 17.6 points and 4.4 assists over 24 games played.

In the summer of 2017, he signed in Spain with Força Lleida CE of the LEB Oro, the Spanish 2nd division for one season. He averaged 13.5 points and 3.1 assists per game in 34 contests in the 2017-2018 season.

In the 2018–19 season, he played for AMSB in the French LNB Pro B.

He averaged 13.1 points and 3.4 assists in the French 2nd Division.

Ogungbemi-Jackson signed with Kataja to play in Finland for the 2019–20 season. The season was cancelled early because of the COVID-19 pandemic. He averaged 17.3 points in 21 games played.

On May 5, 2020, Ogungbemi-Jackson signed with Donar in the Netherlands for the 2020–21 season. After the regular season, he was named to the All-DBL Team after averaging 17.5 points, 5 rebounds and 3.6 assists per game. He also played two games in the FIBA Europe Cup, averaging 24.0 points in two lost games.

On July 10, 2021, he signed with Danish club Bakken Bears of the Basketligan.

In July 2022, he signed with French club Orléans Loiret Basket of the Pro B for the 2022-2023 season. He averaged 15.4 points, 2.8 assists and 3 rebounds per game.

On July 25, 2023, he signed with BC Minsk. On November 26, he set his career high with 38 points in a home loss against Lokomotiv Kuban, 90-86.

Ogungbemi-Jackson signed for his hometown Winnipeg Sea Bears in April 2024. Over 16 games in the 2024 CEBL season, he averaged 13.7 points per game.

Although Ogungbemi-Jackson signed with Tabiat Eslamshahr of the Iranian Basketball Super League on September 23, 2024, he only stayed for 11 days, as he was uncomfortable with the social/political situation in the region.

He got another opportunity almost immediately, as Ogungbemi-Jackson signed with Riesen Ludwigsburg of the Basketball Bundesliga on October 23, 2024. But his time with Riesen Ludwigsburg was short lived also, as he suffered a knee injury after only playing a few games with the club.

== Personal ==
Ogungbemi-Jackson was born in Winnipeg, Manitoba to James and Sybil, Jamaican and Nigerian parents. He started a sports consulting business Hoops Vision Consulting after suffering his knee injury in 2024.
