= Tuomas Iisalo =

Finnish basketball player and coach (born 1982)

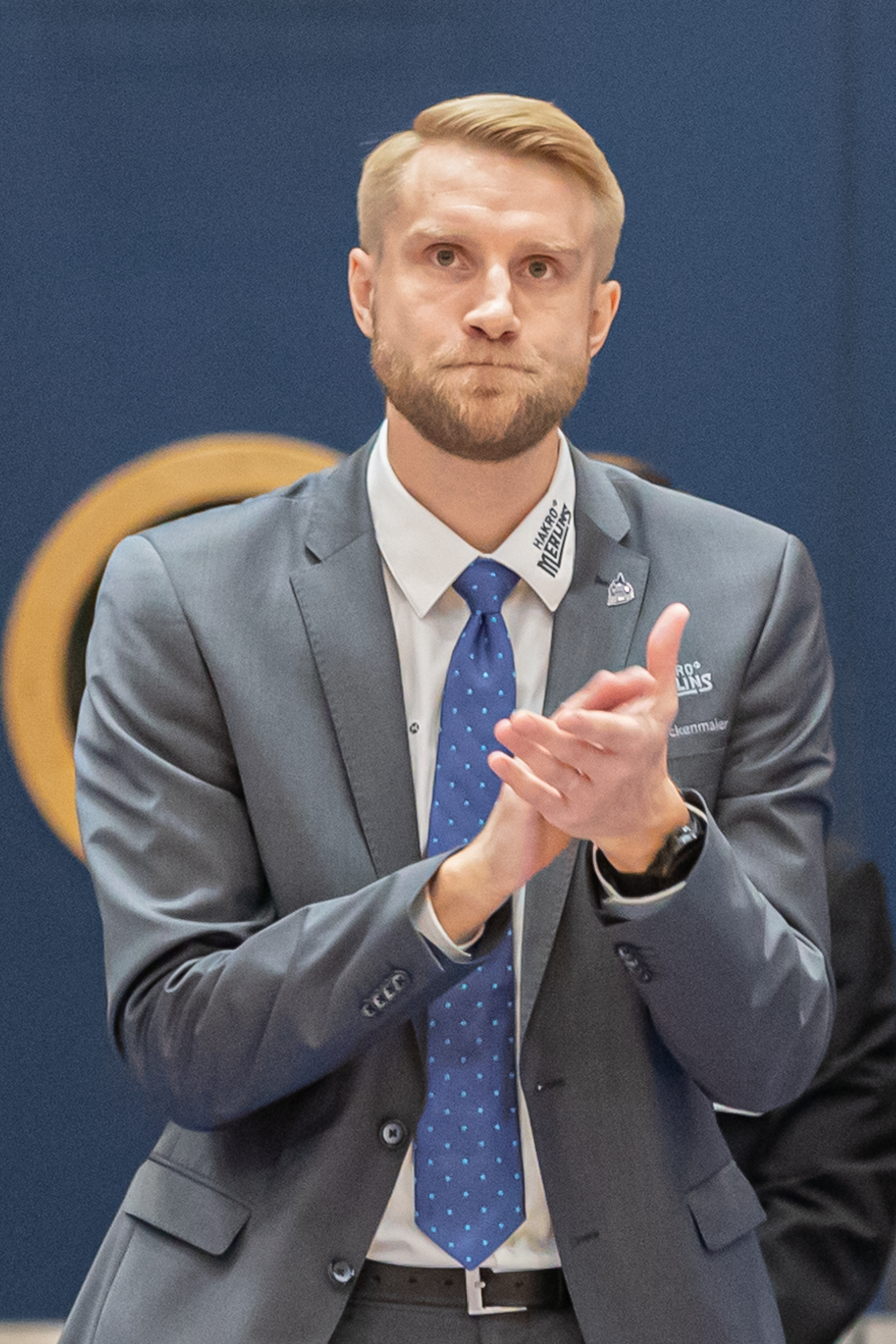
- Iisalo as the head coach of Merlins Crailsheim in 2019

Memphis Grizzlies
- Title: Head coach
- League: NBA

Personal information
- Born: 29 July 1982 (age 44) Helsinki, Finland
- Listed height: 6 ft 5 in (1.96 m)
- Listed weight: 196 lb (89 kg)

Career information
- Playing career: 2000–2014
- Position: Shooting guard
- Coaching career: 2014–present

Career history

Playing
- 2000–2003: Kouvot
- 2003–2006: Espoon Honka
- 2006–2009: Kouvot
- 2009–2011: Espoon Honka
- 2011–2012: Torpan Pojat
- 2012–2014: Espoon Honka

Coaching
- 2014–2015: Tapiolan Honka
- 2016–2021: Crailsheim Merlins
- 2021–2023: Telekom Baskets Bonn
- 2023–2024: Paris Basketball
- 2024–2025: Memphis Grizzlies (assistant)
- 2025–present: Memphis Grizzlies

Career highlights
- As player: Finnish Cup winner (2009); As head coach: EuroCup champion (2024); Champions League champion (2023); French League Cup winner (2024); EuroCup Coach of the Year (2024); Champions League Coach of the Year (2023); 2× Bundesliga Coach of the Year (2022, 2023); LNB Pro A Coach of the Year (2024); Finnish Coach of the Year (2024)

Tuomas Iisalo (born 29 July 1982) is a Finnish professional basketball coach and former player who is the head coach of the Memphis Grizzlies in the NBA. He previously served as an assistant coach of the Grizzlies under Taylor Jenkins.

Standing at 1.95 m (6 ft 5 in), Iisalo played as a shooting guard during his playing career. He also played for the Finland national team.

== Playing career ==
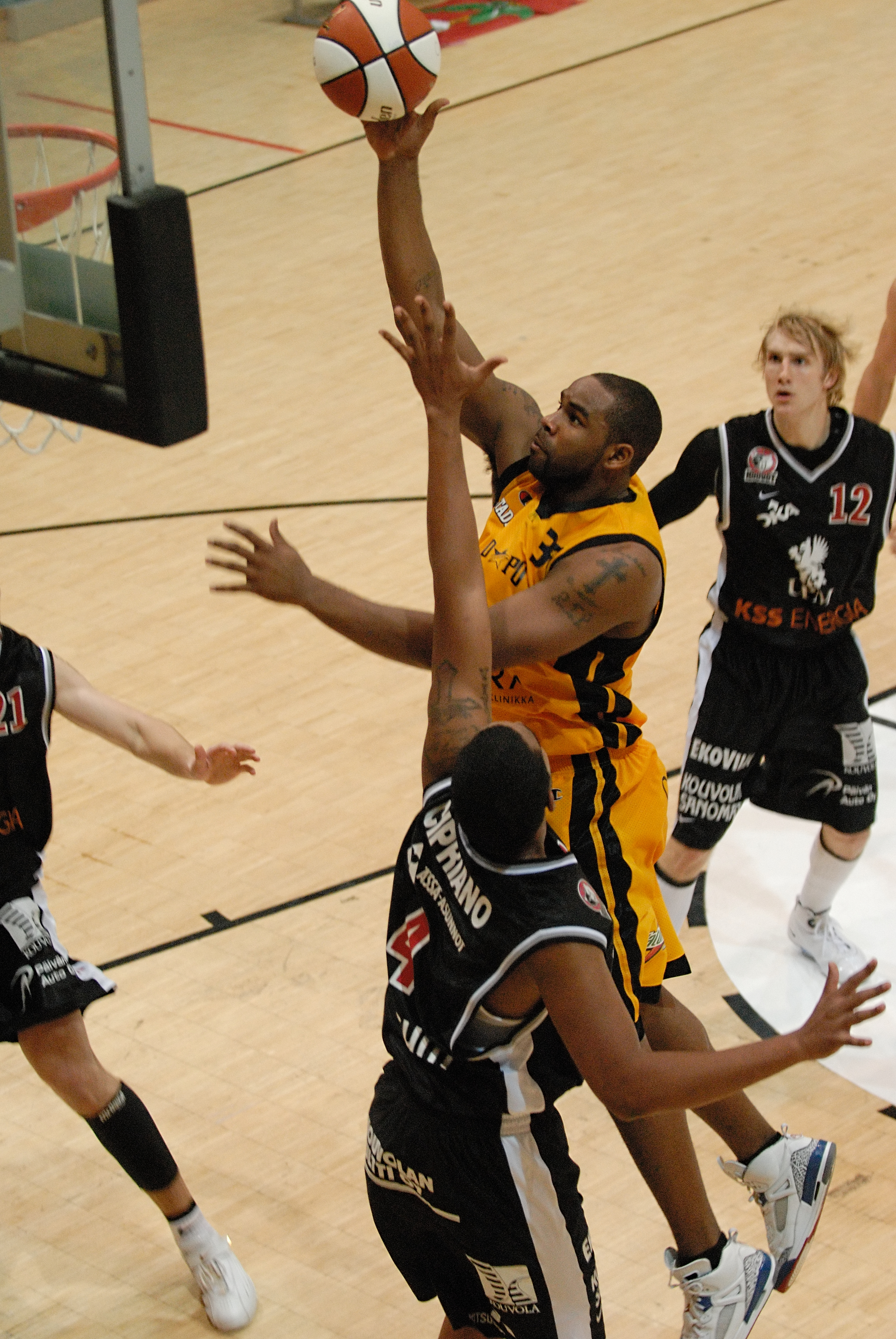
Iisalo (right) playing for Kouvot in 2007

Iisalo grew up in Loviisa since 1990 and played in a youth team of local club Hokki Basket. He started his senior playing career in 2000 with Kouvot in Korisliiga. As a player, Iisalo also represented Korisliiga clubs Espoon Honka and Torpan Pojat. He won the Finnish Cup with Kouvot in 2009.

In his early career, he played for various Finnish youth national teams, and later played 58 games with the Finland senior national team.

Iisalo retired after the 2013–14 season.

== Coaching career ==
During his playing career, Iisalo coached simultaneously at various youth levels. After retiring as a player, Iisalo turned a senior coach when he was appointed the head coach of Tapiolan Honka in Korisliiga in 2014. He worked also as an assistant with Finland U15 national team.

=== Crailsheim Merlins ===
In March 2016, he moved to Germany and signed with Crailsheim Merlins in the Basketball Bundesliga. The team had stuck in the bottom of the table and eventually he could not save the team for the relegation, but extended his deal with Merlins for the upcoming 2016–17 season in ProA. A fellow Finnish coach Vesa Vertio was named his assistant.

At the end of the 2017–18 ProA season, Crailsheim were promoted back to Bundesliga as the runners-up. In the early 2019, his brother Joonas Iisalo accompanied him as an associate coach of the team. In the following seasons they managed to establish the club in the Bundesliga, and in 2020–21 they guided the Merlins to their first-ever Bundesliga playoff berth, with one of the lowest budgets in the league.

=== Telekom Baskets Bonn ===
In May 2021, Iisalo inked a two-year deal with fellow Bundesliga side Telekom Baskets Bonn. In 2022, he was named the Bundesliga Coach of the Year, after finishing 3rd in the regular season with Bonn. Iisalo repeated as the Bundesliga Coach of the Year in the 2022–23 campaign, after leading Bonn to a regular season record of 32 wins and two losses. In May 2023, he won the FIBA Champions League with Bonn and was presented with the Basketball Champions League Best Coach honours. He helped the Bonn team to a trip to the 2023 Bundesliga finals, where they eventually fell short to Ulm. Iisalo parted company with the Bonn club at the end of the 2022–23 season.

=== Paris Basketball ===
On 29 June 2023, Paris Basketball of the French LNB Pro A and the EuroCup announced the appointment of Iisalo as head coach on a three-year deal.

In December 2023, Iisalo was named the head coach of the Team World (Team Monde) in the LNB All-Star Game. On 18 February 2024, Iisalo and Paris won the 2024 LNB Pro A Leaders Cup title, by beating Nanterre 90–85 in the final.

On 6 April 2024, Iisalo was voted the EuroCup Coach of the Year, leading Paris to the 2024 EuroCup Finals with a record-tying 20 wins and only one loss, with the highest team average (98.4 points per game) in the EuroCup history. On 12 April, Iisalo led Paris Basketball to win the 2023–24 EuroCup title, beating JL Bourg-en-Bresse with 2–0 wins in the finals, and earning a place for the next season in the EuroLeague. On 13 May, Iisalo was named the Coach of the Year in LNB Pro A, after leading Paris to the record streak of 25 consecutive games unbeaten. He also led Paris to the LNB Pro A Finals in June 2024.

=== Memphis Grizzlies ===
On 8 July 2024, the Memphis Grizzlies of the National Basketball Association (NBA) named Iisalo as assistant coach, responsible for the team's offense, making him the first Finnish-born coach in the NBA. On 7 November, he debuted as a head coach due to absence of Taylor Jenkins, leading the Grizzlies to a 131–114 win over the Los Angeles Lakers. On 28 March 2025, Iisalo was promoted to interim head coach after Jenkins was fired, despite Memphis having a 44–29 record and being all but confirmed entry for the 2025 NBA playoffs by that time. His first game as head coach in the NBA saw the Grizzlies lose 134–127 to the Los Angeles Lakers a day later. On 2 May 2025, Iisalo was named head coach of the Grizzlies. He is the fourth-ever NBA head coach to be born, raised, and trained outside North America, after Igor Kokoškov, Darko Rajaković, and Jordi Fernández, though others such as Steve Kerr were born and raised outside of North America before an amateur basketball career in the United States.

== Coaching style ==
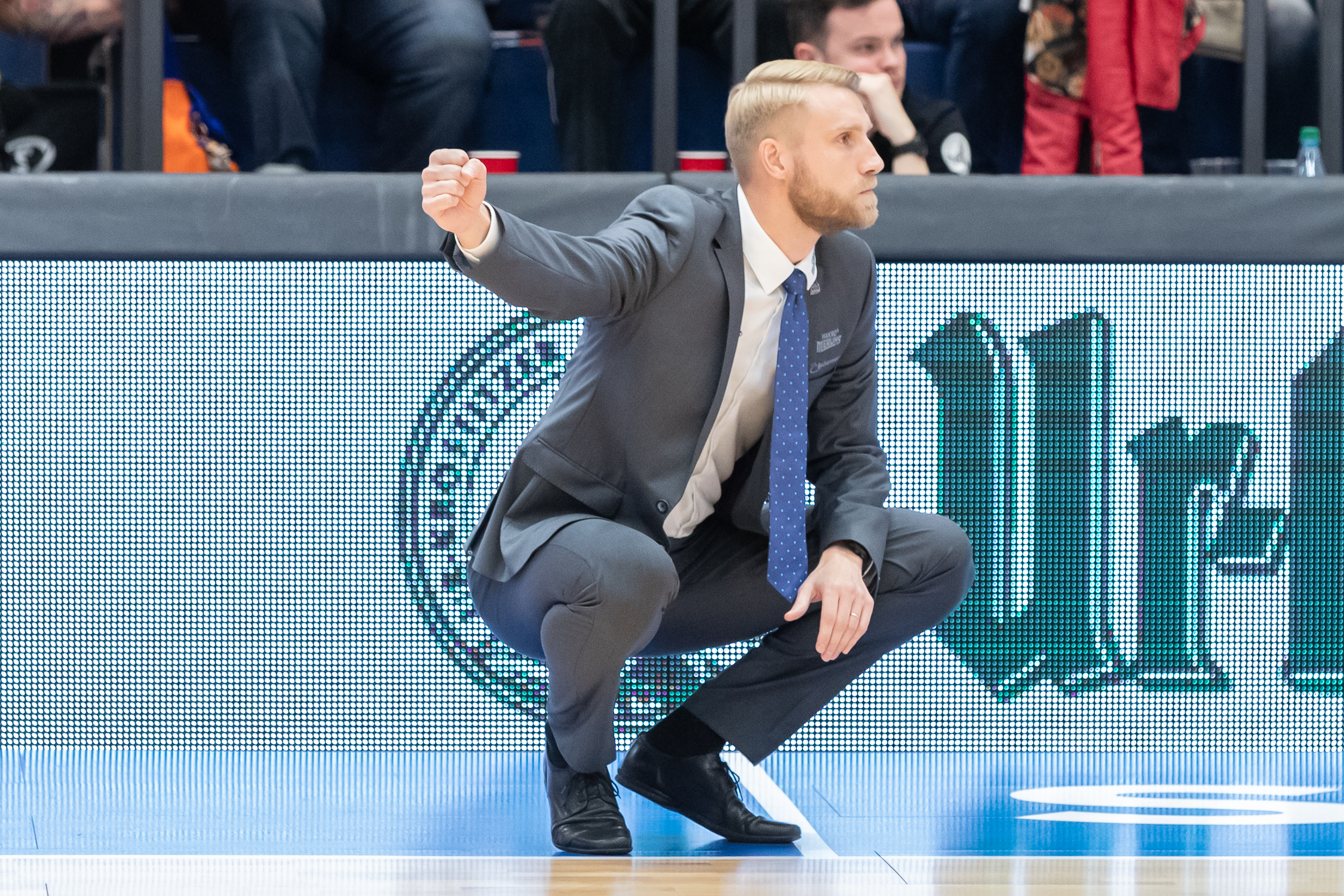
Iisalo with Merlins in a match against Mitteldeutscher BC in 2019

According to reports, Iisalo' style has been based on pace, many three-point shots and strong offensive rebounding. He has been described an extremely demanding coach. In Memphis, Iisalo's approach, which involved using three-to four-minute rotations with mass substitutions to maintain a high-intensity game, generated friction with Ja Morant.

In late June 2024, Iisalo was one of the coach lecturers in the Dušan Ivković Basketball Coaching Clinic in Belgrade, Serbia, teaching offense through variable big men and speaking about the evolution of his pick and roll defence.

He was voted the Coach of the Year in Finland in 2024 by the Finnish sports journalists.

Iisalo has named Finnish coach Harri Mannonen his basketball mentor. Mannonen first coached Iisalo in Kouvot in 2001.

== Head coaching record in the NBA ==
Legend
Regular season	G	Games coached	W	Games won	L	Games lost	W–L %	Win–loss %
Playoffs	PG	Playoff games	PW	Playoff wins	PL	Playoff losses	PW–L %	Playoff win–loss %

Team	Year	G	W	L	W–L%	Finish	PG	PW	PL	PW–L%	Result
Memphis	2024–25	9	4	5	.444	2nd in Southwest	4	0	4	.000	Lost in first round
Memphis	2025–26	82	25	57	.305	5th in Southeast	—	—	—	—	Missed playoffs
Career		91	29	62	.319		4	0	4	.000	

== Personal life ==
Iisalo and his wife have three children.

Iisalo's father worked as a foreign correspondent in East Berlin in the 1980s, where the family lived between 1983 and 1987.

His younger brother Joonas is also a professional basketball coach. Their older sister Meri Valkama became a journalist who won the literature prize of Helsingin Sanomat in 2021 for the best debut novel in Finland with her book "Sinun, Margot", where she tells the story of a family in East Berlin. Their grandfather Aulis Iisalo fought in the Winter War and in the Continuation War, and was later awarded a Cross of Liberty. During the 1990s, Aulis Iisalo recorded NBA games to VHS tapes from cable channels and sent those tapes to Tuomas and Joonas who would analyse the games since their early teens.

== Coaching honours ==
International

- EuroCup champion: 2023–24
- Basketball Champions League champion: 2022–23

Domestic

- French League Cup winner: 2024
- LNB Pro A runner-up: 2023–24
- Basketball Bundesliga runner-up: 2022–23
- ProA runner-up: 2016–17, 2017–18

== See also ==
- List of foreign NBA coaches
