= Crailsheim Merlins =

Professional basketball team in Crailsheim, Germany

Hakro Merlins Crailsheim
- Leagues: ProA
- Founded: 31 January 1986; 40 years ago
- History: Crailsheim Merlins (1986–present)
- Arena: Arena Hohenlohe
- Capacity: 3,000
- Team colors: Blue, Navy, Silver
- Main sponsor: Hakro
- President: Martin Romig
- Team manager: Ingo Enskat
- Head coach: Florian Flabb
- Championships: 1 ProB
- Website: crailsheim-merlins.de
Home	Away	Third

Crailsheim Merlins, currently referred to as HAKRO Merlins Crailsheim for sponsorship reasons, is a professional basketball club based in Crailsheim, Germany. Established in 1986, the club plays in the ProA, the second league of professional basketball in Germany. The club is a part of the multi-sports club TSV Crailsheim. Home games are played in the Arena Hohenlohe, which has a capacity of 3,000 people.

== History ==
The club was founded on 31 January 1986 by a group of students. Until 1994, the team was only active at the lower local leagues and had problems in finding a hall to play at. A year later, the club found a new home in the barracks of departed American armed forces. In 2001, the Merlins managed to get promoted to the German second division, now the ProA, for the first time. A new home arena was found again, in the form of a renovated market hall.

In the 2013–14 season Merlins promoted to the Basketball Bundesliga, by reaching the ProA Finals. The club managed to avoid relegation in its first season in the league, because Artland Dragons was relegated the club received a wild card. However, in the following 2015–16 season the team was relegated once again after finishing last. In the 2020–21 season, coach Tuomas Iisalo guided the Merlins to their first Bundesliga playoff appearance in club history. Iisalo left Crailsheim at the conclusion of the 2020–21 campaign, Sebastian Gleim was named the new head coach.

In the 2021–22 season, Crailsheim made its European debut as it was placed in the regular season of the FIBA Europe Cup. On 13 October 2021, the Merlins recorded an away win over Bakken Bears in their debut. The same season, the Merlins also reached the final of the 2021–22 BBL-Pokal, its first final appearance in the national cup. The Merlins eventually lost to 86–78 to ALBA Berlin.

== Sponsorship names ==
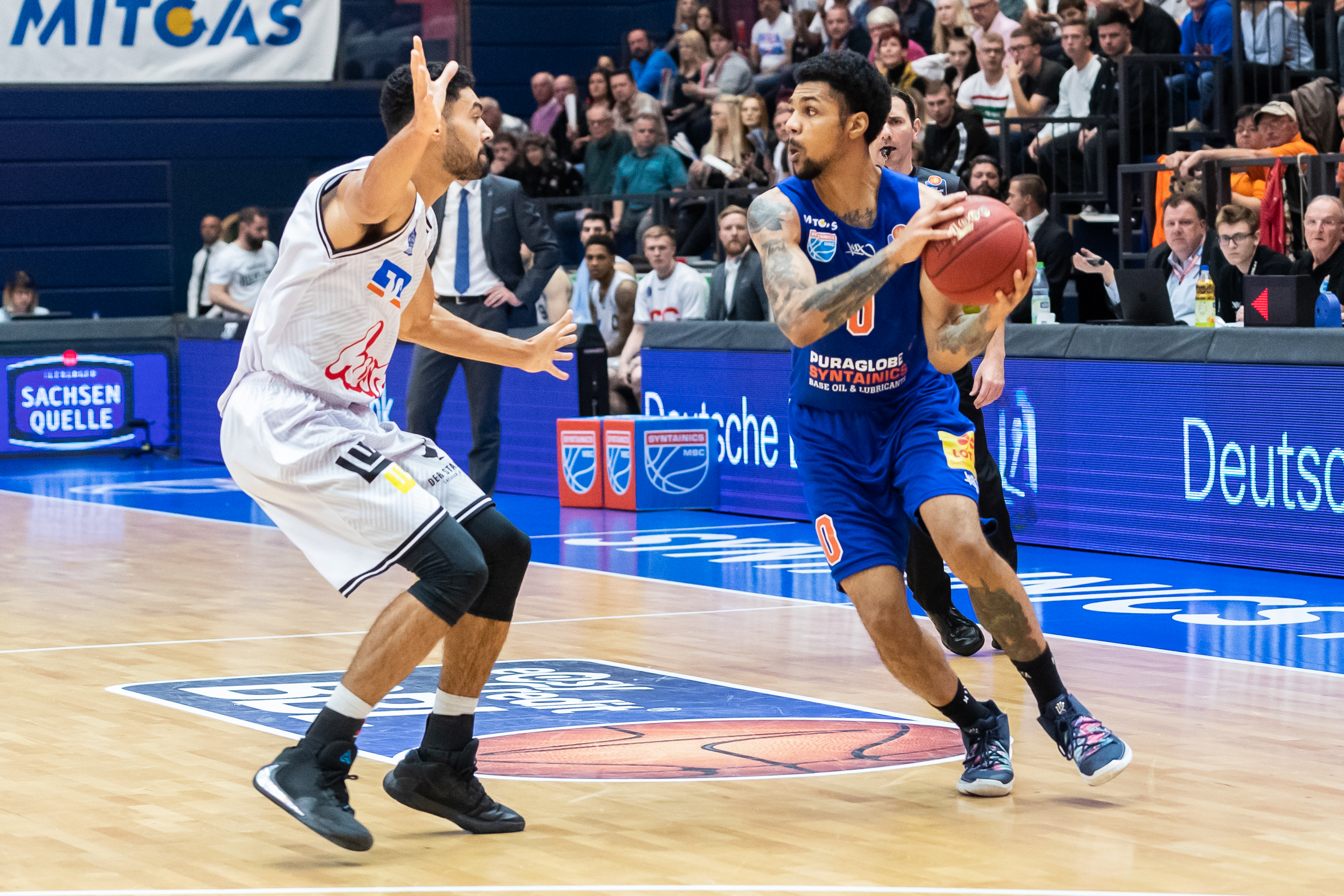
Jeremy Morgan on the left, on defense for the Merlins.

Due to sponsorship reasons the team has been known as:

- Proveo Merlins: 2007–2009
- HAKRO Merlins Crailsheim: 2018–present

== Honours ==
BBL-Pokal

- Runners-up: 2021–22

ProB

- Winners: 2008–09

== Players ==
=== Current roster ===
Crailsheim Merlins roster
Players
Coaches

Pos.	No.	Nat.	Name	Ht.	Wt.	Age
F	2	(United States)	Alexander II, Courtney	2.03 m (6 ft 8 in)	100 kg (220 lb)	29 – 8 May 1997
SG	4	(Germany)	Hermann, Mathéo	1.95 m (6 ft 5 in)	87 kg (192 lb)	18 – 21 December 2007
SF	5	(Austria) (Germany)	Höllerl, Nico	1.98 m (6 ft 6 in)	90 kg (198 lb)	23 – 27 August 2003
G	6	(United States)	Coplin, Booker	1.91 m (6 ft 3 in)	93 kg (205 lb)	28 – 19 November 1997
G	7	(United States) (Ghana)	Addae-Wusu, Dylan	1.93 m (6 ft 4 in)	105 kg (231 lb)	25 – 17 July 2001
G	8	(Germany)	Mayer, Lucas	1.85 m (6 ft 1 in)	87 kg (192 lb)	27 – 30 August 1999
C	9	(Germany)	Drescher, Hendrik	2.05 m (6 ft 9 in)	100 kg (220 lb)	26 – 21 March 2000
PG	10	(Germany)	Otto, Gianni (C)	1.86 m (6 ft 1 in)	79 kg (174 lb)	31 – 28 June 1995
F	11	(Germany)	Van Slooten, Luc	2.02 m (6 ft 8 in)	96 kg (212 lb)	24 – 17 April 2002
F	13	(United States)	Gerald, Peyton	2.05 m (6 ft 9 in)	95 kg (209 lb)	23 – 20 January 2003
F/C	19	(Germany)	Ikejiaku, Phil	2.03 m (6 ft 8 in)	93 kg (205 lb)	19 – 16 June 2007
C	21	(Germany)	Isemann, Till	2.09 m (6 ft 10 in)	110 kg (243 lb)	30 – 21 October 1996
PF	25	(Germany)	Dordevic, Marko	2.01 m (6 ft 7 in)	101 kg (223 lb)	23 – 23 February 2003
SG	55	(Slovakia)	Krajčovič, Šimon	1.88 m (6 ft 2 in)	86 kg (190 lb)	32 – 14 February 1994

Head coach

- (Germany) Florian Flabb

Assistant coach(es)

- (Germany) Tom Walther

Legend

- (C) Team captain
- Injured

- Roster
Updated: November 15, 2026

Note: Flags indicate national team eligibility at FIBA-sanctioned events. Players may hold other non-FIBA nationalities not displayed.

=== Notable players ===
Note: Flags indicate national team eligibility at FIBA-sanctioned events. Players may hold other non-FIBA nationalities not displayed.

Criteria

To appear in this section a player must have either:

- Set a club record or won an individual award while at the club
- Played at least one official international match for their national team at any time
- Played at least one official NBA match at any time.

- (Germany) Konrad Wysocki
- (Germany) Maurice Stuckey
- (Chile) / (Germany) Sebastián Herrera
- (Cuba) Yorman Polas Bartolo
- (Finland) Tuukka Kotti
- (Finland) / (Kosovo) Edon Maxhuni
- (North Macedonia) / (United States) T. J. Shorts
- (United States) Haywood Highsmith
- (United States) Stevie Johnson
- (United States) Willie Young

== Head coaches ==
Period	Name
1986–1989	(Germany) Dieter Wolfarth
1989–1990	no head coach
1990–1993	(Germany) Markus Schmidt
1993–1994	(Serbia) Zoran Borovnica
1994–1997	(Croatia) Zlatko Nikolić
1997–1999	(Germany) Matthias Braun
1999–2002	(Croatia) Zoran Banozic
2002–2004	(Croatia) Velibor Balabanović
2004	(Romania) Marian Thede
2004–2008	(Germany) Arne Alig
2008–2012	(Germany) Ingo Enskat
2012 – November 2014	(United States) Willie Young
November 2014 – March 2016	(Germany) Ingo Enskat
March 2016 – May 2021	(Finland) Tuomas Iisalo
May 2021 – May 2022	(Germany) Sebastian Gleim
May 2022 – November 2023	(Germany) Nikola Marković
November 2023 – May 2024	(Finland) Jussi Laakso
May 2024 – April 2026	(Germany) David McCray
May 2026 – present	(Germany) Florian Flabb

== Season by season ==
Season	Tier	League	Pos.	German Cup	European competitions	
2009–10	2	ProA	6			
2010–11	2	ProA	6			
2011–12	2	ProA	4			
2012–13	2	ProA	11			
2013–14	2	ProA	2			
2014–15	1	BBL	18			
2015–16	1	BBL	18			
2016–17	2	ProA	2			
2017–18	2	ProA	2			
2018–19	1	BBL	16			
2019–20	1	BBL	10	Round of 16		
2020–21	1	BBL	5	Group stage		
2021–22	1	BBL	9	Runner-up	FIBA Europe Cup	QF
2022–23	1	BBL	13	Quarterfinals	FIBA Europe Cup	2R
2023–24	1	BBL	17	First round		
2024–25	2	ProA	5	Round of 16		
2025–26	2	ProA	5	First round		
2026–27	2	ProA		First round		
