= Björn Harmsen =

German basketball coach

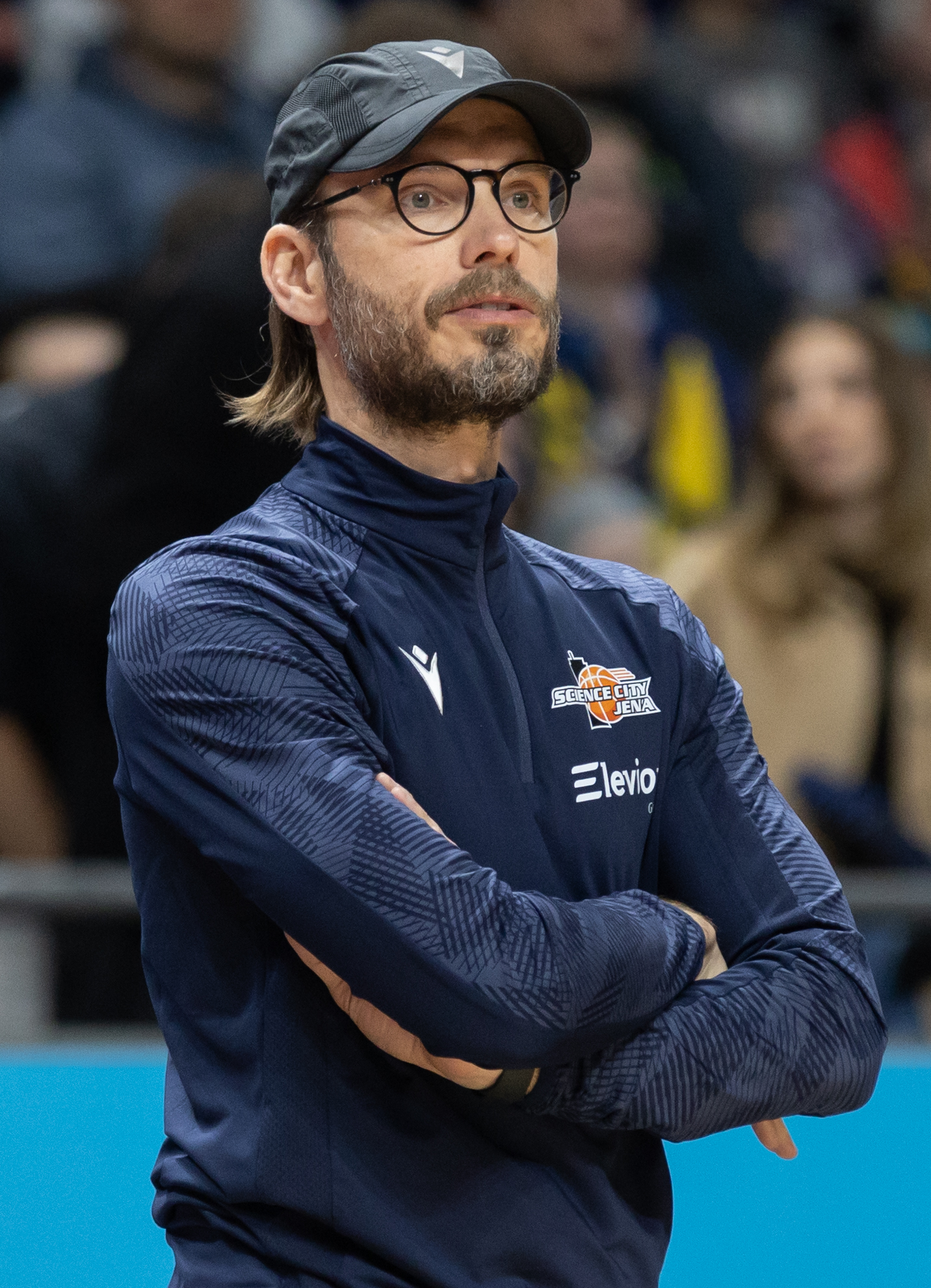
- Harmsen, 2025

Personal information
- Born: July 19, 1982 (age 44) Göttingen, Germany
- Position: Head coach
- Coaching career: 2005–present

Career history

Coaching
- 2005–2006: POM Baskets Jena (assistant)
- 2006–2008: Science City Jena
- 2008–2011: Mitteldeutscher
- 2011–2012: Gießen 46ers
- 2012–2021: Science City Jena
- 2021–2023: Uni Baskets Münster
- 2023–2026: Science City Jena

Career highlights
- 3x ProA champion (2007, 2009, 2016); 3x ProA Coach of the Year (2009, 2016, 2025)

Björn Harmsen (born 19 July 1982) is a German basketball coach. He most recently was the head coach of Science City Jena of the German Basketball Bundesliga (BBL).

== Coaching career ==
He started his coaching career in 2005, with Jena.

In 2016, Harmsen achieved promotion to the first-tier Basketball Bundesliga with Science City Jena.

In 2021 he signed with Uni Baskets Münster of the German ProB. He led the team to a promotion to the ProA in the 2021/22 season.

After the first ProA season with Uni Baskets Münster he signed back with Science City Jena in 2023.
