= 2024–25 ProA =

ProA
- Season: 2024–25
- Games played: 331
- Teams: 18

Regular season
- Season MVP: Keith Braxton
- Promoted: VET Concept Trier Gladiators; Science City Jena
- Relegated: Dresden Titans; Rasta Vechta II

Finals
- Champions: VET Concept Trier Gladiators (1st title)
- Runners-up: Science City Jena

The 2024–25 ProA was the 18th season of the ProA, the second level of basketball in Germany. The champions and the runners-up of the play-offs were promoted to the 2025–26 Basketball Bundesliga.

VET Concept Trier Gladiators won its first ProA championship after defeating Science City Jena, which promoted too, in the finals.

== Teams ==
In the 2024-25 season, 18 teams participated in the ProA.

Each team had to put in a deposit of €15.339,- to participate. In addition, they had to pay €15.350,- as a registration fee, for doping control and development of the league. For the payment of referees, each team had to pay €28.000,- and an additional €6,750,- in case of reaching the play-offs. Lastly a commissioners fee was requested of €5.250,- with an additional fee of €1.900,- in case of reaching the play-offs.

Clubs of the ProA 2024/25

Team	City
ART Giants Düsseldorf	Düsseldorf
Artland Dragons	Quakenbrück
Dresden Titans	Dresden
Eisbären Bremerhaven	Bremerhaven
Giessen 46ers	Giessen
Science City Jena	Jena
Nürnberg Falcons BC	Nuremberg
Phoenix Hagen	Hagen
PS Karlsruhe LIONS	Karlsruhe
VET-CONCEPT Gladiators Trier	Trier
Uni Baskets Münster	Münster
Bozic Estriche Knights Kirchheim	Kirchheim unter Teck
VfL SparkassenStars Bochum	Bochum
EPG GUARDIANS Koblenz	Koblenz
Tigers Tübingen	Tübingen
Rasta Vechta II	Vechta
HAKRO Merlins Crailsheim	Crailsheim
BBC Bayreuth	Bayreuth

== Regular season ==
The regular season took place from the 20th of September until the 26th of April 2025, consisting of 34 gamedays.

#	Team	Games	Won	Lost	Points made	Difference	Points
1	Science City Jena	34	30	4	3137:2593	544	60
2	VET-CONCEPT Gladiators Trier	34	26	8	3190:2785	405	52
3	HAKRO Merlins Crailsheim	34	24	10	3018:2687	331	48
4	Eisbären Bremerhaven	34	23	11	2834:2617	217	46
5	GIESSEN 46ers	34	23	11	2919:2651	268	46
6	Phoenix Hagen	34	20	14	2871:2719	152	40
7	Tigers Tübingen	34	20	14	2715:2723	−8	40
8	VfL SparkassenStars Bochum	34	20	14	2819:2904	−85	40
9	Bozic Estriche Knights Kirchheim	34	20	14	2838:2806	32	40
10	Uni Baskets Münster	34	17	17	2858:2856	2	34
11	PS Karlsruhe Lions	34	13	21	2696:2844	−148	26
12	BBC Bayreuth	34	13	21	2831:2983	−152	26
13	Nürnberg Falcons BC	34	11	23	2565:2762	−197	22
14	ART Giants Düsseldorf	34	9	25	2672:2909	−237	18
15	EPG GUARDIANS Koblenz	34	9	25	2631:2960	−329	18
16	Artland Dragons	34	9	25	2738:2960	−222	18
18	Dresden Titans*	34	15	19	2875:2939	−64	30
18	RASTA Vechta II	34	4	30	2646:3155	−509	8

- Dresden Titans pulled back their ProA license for the 2025-2026 season, earning them an automatic 18th spot and relegation.

Play-off-Position (Places 1 to 8)
Relegated (Place 17 and 18)

== Playoffs ==
Quarter-finals
Science City Jena	3
VfL SparkassenStars Bochum	0
Eisbären Bremerhaven	1
GIESSEN 46ers	3
HAKRO Merlins Crailsheim	2
Phoenix Hagen	3
Gladiators Trier	3
Tigers Tübingen	1

Semi-finals
Science City Jena	3
GIESSEN 46ers	1
Phoenix Hagen	0
Gladiators Trier	3

Final
Science City Jena	82	75
Gladiators Trier	85	90

=== Quarterfinals ===
Team 1	Series	Team 2	Game 1	Game 2	Game 3	Game 4	Game 5
Science City Jena	3–0	VfL SparkassenStars Bochum	99-75	93-75	102-77	—	—
Eisbären Bremerhaven	1–3	GIESSEN 46ers	98-109	74-86	83-69	61-80	—
HAKRO Merlins Crailsheim	2–3	Phoenix Hagen	78-71	67-83	94-91	93-100	73-77
Gladiators Trier	3–1	Tigers Tübingen	105-86	95-106	94-75	100-95	—

=== Semifinals ===
Team 1	Series	Team 2	Game 1	Game 2	Game 3	Game 4	Game 5
Science City Jena	3–1	GIESSEN 46ers	80-84	87-77	99-66	97-95	—
Gladiators Trier	3–0	Phoenix Hagen	87-74	99-87	87-69	—	—

=== Finals ===
Team 1	Agg.	Team 2	1st leg	2nd leg
Science City Jena	157–175	Gladiators Trier	82-85	75-90
