= 2026–27 BBL-Pokal =

- Dates: 10 September 2026 – 21 February 2027
- Teams: 24

The 2026–27 BBL-Pokal is the 60th season of the BBL-Pokal, the domestic cup competition of the Basketball Bundesliga (BBL), held from 10 September 2026 to 21 February 2027.

== Format ==
The top eight teams of the 2025–26 Basketball Bundesliga receive a bye and move on to the round of 16. Ten teams from the Bundesliga and six teams from the ProA will enter in the first round.

== Schedule ==
The rounds of the 2026–27 competition are scheduled as follows:

Round	Matches
First round	10–13 September 2026
Round of 16	16–19 October 2026
Quarterfinals	12–13 December 2026
Final four	20–21 February 2027

== First round ==
The draw took place on 29 July 2026. The games took place between 10 and 13 September 2026.

10 September 2026
18:30

Boxscore

Crailsheim Merlins	86–93	Phoenix Hagen
Scoring by quarter: 20–12, 19–24, 19–24, 28–33
Pts: Booker Coplin 23; Rebs: Courtney Alexander 9 Asts: Šimon Krajčovič 5		Pts: Trenton Gibson 23; Rebs: Cameron Krutwig 10; Asts: Marcus Graves 4

Arena Hohenlohe, Crailsheim
Attendance: 2,166
Referees: Johannes Hack, Andreas Bohn, Benedikt Loder

10 September 2026
20:00

Boxscore

Eisbären Bremerhaven	67–87	Löwen Braunschweig
Scoring by quarter: 12–20, 12–22, 24–30, 19–15
Pts: Garai Zeeb 11; Rebs: Jeremiah Oden 9 Asts: Garai Zeeb 7		Pts: Sheldon Edwards 19; Rebs: Zaba Bangala 12; Asts: Ferdinand Zylka 5

ÖVB Arena, Bremen
Attendance: 1,328
Referees: Dennis Sirowi, Gentian Cici, Aleksandra Pawlik

11 September 2026
20:00

Boxscore

Veolia Towers Hamburg	90–81	Rostock Seawolves
Scoring by quarter: 17–27, 31–21, 23–13, 19–20
Pts: Noah Thomasson 27; Rebs: David Muenkat 10; Asts: Zakai Zeigler 7		Pts: TJ Crockett 24; Rebs: Owen Klassen 6 Asts: DeAndre Lansdowne 4

Inselpark Arena, Hamburg
Attendance: 2,066
Referees: Robert Lottermoser, Nermin Hodzic, Doğu Berk İnnal

12 September 2026
18:30

Boxscore

Giessen 46ers	70–77	Niners Chemnitz
Scoring by quarter: 20–17, 28–22, 20–21, 12–17
Pts: Nigel Scantlebury 16; Rebs: Kovačević 8 Asts: Nigel Scantlebury 4		Pts: Cobe Williams 24; Rebs: Nighael Ceaser 9 Asts: Stefan Smith 5

Sporthalle Gießen-Ost, Gießen
Attendance: 2,318
Referees: Radeesh Kattur, Moritz Reiter, Gentian Cici

12 September 2026
20:00

Boxscore

BG Göttingen	83–113	Syntainics MBC
Scoring by quarter: 16–32, 36–21, 11–30, 20–30
Pts: Zach Jackson 20; Rebs: Omar Pajić 9 Asts: Daniel Kirchner 7		Pts: Kostja Mushidi 24; Rebs: Jure Planinić 11; Asts: DeLonnie Hunt 5

Sparkassen-Arena, Göttingen
Attendance: 1,847
Referees: Anne Panther, Zulfikar Oruzgani, Adrian Iglesias

13 September 2026
15:00

Boxscore

VfL Kirchheim Knights	73–98	MHP Riesen Ludwigsburg
Scoring by quarter: 16–23, 22–22, 16–26, 19–27
Pts: Philip Alston 21; Rebs: Alston, Morgan 6 Asts: Julius Wolf 5		Pts: Leggett, Perry 19; Rebs: four players 4 Asts: Darius Perry 6

EWS Arena, Göppingen
Attendance: 2,150
Referees: Benjamin Barth, Enrico Streit, Kristaps Konstantinovs

13 September 2026
16:30

Boxscore

Skyliners Frankfurt	94–63	Science City Jena
Scoring by quarter: 24–20, 16–15, 33–20, 21–8
Pts: Isaiah Swope 16; Rebs: Race Thompson 5 Asts: Mintz, Klepeisz 4		Pts: Terrence Edwards Jr. 18; Rebs: Terrence Edwards Jr. 6 Asts: Raphael Falkenthal 8

Süwag Energie ARENA, Frankfurt
Attendance: 2,773
Referees: Christof Madinger, Armin Mutapcic, Nils Kremer

13 September 2026
18:00

Boxscore

USC Heidelberg	62–82	EWE Baskets Oldenburg
Scoring by quarter: 16–22, 19–15, 20–23, 8–22
Pts: Franklin Champion 17; Rebs: Franklin Champion 6 Asts: Chuck Harris 5		Pts: Nate Johnson 28; Rebs: Demajeo Wiggins 10; Asts: Johnson, Roach 4

SNP Dome, Heidelberg
Attendance: 2,644
Referees: Moritz Krüper, Martin Matip, Jens Rupprecht

== Round of 16 ==
The draw took place on 29 July 2026. The games took place between 16 and 19 October 2026.

16 October 2026
20:00

Boxscore

EWE Baskets Oldenburg	61–75	Telekom Baskets Bonn
Scoring by quarter: 16–24, 13–14, 23–11, 9–26
Pts: Nicholas Tischler 14; Rebs: Hinrichs, Wiggins 9 Asts: Seth Hinrichs 5		Pts: Marcus Foster 16; Rebs: Garrett Jr., Kratzer 7 Asts: Grayson Murphy 4

Große EWE Arena, Oldenburg
Attendance: 6,244
Referees: Radeesh Kattur, Martin Matip, Dennis Sirowi

17 October 2026
20:00

Boxscore

ratiopharm Ulm	98–107	Phoenix Hagen
Scoring by quarter: 23–24, 22–21, 17–24, 36–28
Pts: Ibi Watson 22; Rebs: Meïssa Faye 7 Asts: Ibi Watson 5		Pts: Tyler Polley 22; Rebs: Cameron Krutwig 7 Asts: Trenton Gibson 7

ratiopharm arena, Neu-Ulm
Attendance: 4,352
Referees: Anne Panther, Enrico Streit, Jens Rupprecht

18 October 2026
15:00

Boxscore

Fitness First Würzburg Baskets	93–83	Syntainics MBC
Scoring by quarter: 28–16, 22–23, 15–21, 28–23
Pts: Calvin Wishart 19; Rebs: Charles Thompson 12; Asts: Kenny Dye 5		Pts: DeLonnie Hunt 17; Rebs: Boriša Simanić 10; Asts: Hunt, Reaves 3

Tectake Arena, Würzburg
Attendance: 2,347
Referees: Tamer Arik, Moritz Krüper, Gentian Cici

18 October 2026
15:00

Boxscore

Löwen Braunschweig	75–102	Niners Chemnitz
Scoring by quarter: 10–31, 21–18, 24–25, 20–28
Pts: Dejour Reaves 16; Rebs: Chip Flanigan 8 Asts: Gian Aydinoglu 4		Pts: Ben Burnham 24; Rebs: Ben Burnham 9 Asts: Phlandrous Fleming Jr. 8

Volkswagen Halle, Braunschweig
Attendance: 2,696
Referees: Andreas Bohn, Kristaps Konstantinovs, Christian Theis

18 October 2026
16:30

Boxscore

Skyliners Frankfurt	78–65	Vet-Concept Gladiators Trier
Scoring by quarter: 22–15, 12–15, 25–18, 19–17
Pts: Judah Mintz 18; Rebs: Race Thompson 9 Asts: three players 4		Pts: Jordan Roland 15; Rebs: three players 5 Asts: Jordan Roland 7

Süwag Energie ARENA, Frankfurt
Attendance: 2,644
Referees: Christof Madinger, Adrian Iglesias, Nils Kremer

18 October 2026
16:30

Boxscore

MHP Riesen Ludwigsburg	72–75	Rasta Vechta
Scoring by quarter: 21–15, 28–14, 11–29, 12–17
Pts: Hughes, Perry 14; Rebs: Tommy Rutherford 9 Asts: Baumer, Polas Bartolo 3		Pts: Lewis, Trice 14; Rebs: Matt Lewis 10; Asts: Edler-Davis, Trice 3

MHP-Arena, Ludwigsburg
Attendance: 3,047
Referees: Moritz Reiter, Aleksandra Pawlik, Nicolas Rotter

18 October 2026
18:00

Boxscore

Veolia Towers Hamburg	63–85	Bayern Munich
Scoring by quarter: 18–14, 12–28, 15–24, 18–19
Pts: Mathys Kangudia 16; Rebs: Nicolas Pavrette 7 Asts: Mathys Kangudia 3		Pts: Duane Washington Jr. 12; Rebs: Vladimir Lučić 8 Asts: Vladimir Lučić 4

Inselpark Arena, Hamburg
Attendance: 3,400
Referees: Robert Lottermoser, Nermin Hodzic, Dogu Innal

19 October 2026
20:00

Boxscore

Alba Berlin	83–71	Bamberg Baskets
Scoring by quarter: 17–19, 16–22, 23–16, 27–14
Pts: Justin Bean 20; Rebs: Brandon Angel 7 Asts: Jordan Ford 7		Pts: Richard Balint 13; Rebs: Mylik Watson 12; Asts: Jordan Jones 7

Uber Arena, Berlin
Attendance: 8,615
Referees: Steve Bittner, Nermin Hodzic, Maximilian Meiler

== Quarterfinals ==
The draw took place on 19 October 2026. The games will take place between 12 and 13 December 2026.

12 December 2026
18:30

Boxscore

Telekom Baskets Bonn	vs.	Skyliners Frankfurt

Telekom Dome, Bonn

12 December 2026
20:00

Boxscore

Fitness First Würzburg Baskets	vs.	Bayern Munich

Tectake Arena, Würzburg

13 December 2026
15:00

Boxscore

Niners Chemnitz	vs.	Rasta Vechta

Chemnitz Arena, Chemnitz

13 December 2026
18:00

Boxscore

Phoenix Hagen	vs.	Alba Berlin

Ischelandhalle, Hagen

== Final four ==
The games will take place on 20 and 21 February 2027 at the SAP Garden in Munich.
