= 2013–14 ProA =

ProA
- Teams: 16

Regular season
- Season MVP: (United States) Harper Kamp
- Promoted: BG Göttingen (1); Crailsheim Merlins (2)
- Relegated: BG Karlsruhe; Otto Baskets Magdeburg

Finals
- Champions: BG Göttingen; 2nd title
- Runners-up: Crailsheim Merlins
- Semifinalists: Gießen 46ers rent4office Nürnberg

Awards
- Youngster of the Year: (Germany) Stephan Haukohl
- Coach of the Year: (Germany) Ralph Junge

Statistical leaders
Points	(United States) Garrett Sim	20.8
Rebounds	(United States) Dennis Tinnon	10.7
Assists	(United States) Ahmad Smith	7.1

The 2013–14 ProA, was the 7th season of the ProA, the second level of basketball in Germany. BG Göttingen and Crailsheim Merlins got a place in the 2014–15 Basketball Bundesliga by reaching the Finals. Göttingen took the ProA title by winning 174–162 in two legs.

== Standings ==
Pos	Team	Pld	W	L	PF	PA	PD	Qualification or relegation
1	BG Göttingen	30	26	4	2659	2309	+350	Playoffs
2	Crailsheim Merlins	30	22	8	2602	2337	+265	Playoffs
3	erdgas Ehingen/Urspr.schule	30	18	12	2329	2265	+64	Playoffs
4	Gießen 46ers	30	18	12	2339	2295	+44	Playoffs
5	Science City Jena	30	18	12	2858	2670	+188	Playoffs
6	rent4office Nürnberg	30	17	13	2490	2449	+41	Playoffs
7	Oettinger Rockets Gotha	30	17	13	2402	2369	+33	Playoffs
8	ETB Wohnbau Baskets	30	16	14	2390	2329	+61	Playoffs
9	MLP Academics Heidelberg	30	16	14	2514	2368	+146	–
10	Kirchheim Knights	30	15	15	2503	2526	−23	–
11	BV Chemnitz 99	30	15	15	2333	2349	−16	–
12	finke baskets	30	10	20	2409	2578	−169	–
13	Bayer Giants Leverkusen	30	9	21	2238	2468	−230	–
14	Cuxhaven BasCats	30	8	22	2008	2493	−485	–
15	BG Karlsruhe	30	7	23	2323	2490	−167	Relegated
16	Otto Baskets Magdeburg	30	8	22	2267	2569	−302	Relegated

== Playoffs ==
Quarterfinals
1	BG Göttingen	3
8	ETB Wohnbau Baskets	1
4	Gießen 46ers	3
5	Science City Jena	2
2	Crailsheim Merlins	3
7	Oettinger Rockets Gotha	1
3	erdgas Ehingen/Urspr.schule	2
6	rent4office Nürnberg	3

Semifinals
1	BG Göttingen	3
4	Gießen 46ers	0
2	Crailsheim Merlins	3
6	rent4office Nürnberg	1

Finals (Note: The Finals were played with two legs)
1	BG Göttingen	174
2	Crailsheim Merlins	162

== Awards ==
- Player of the Year: (United States) Harper Kamp (BG Göttingen)
- Youngster of the Year: (Germany) Stephan Haukohl (erdgas Ehingen/Urspr.schule)
- Coach of the Year: (Germany) Ralph Junge (erdgas Ehingen/Urspr.schule)
