= 2014–15 ProA =

ProA
- Teams: 16

Regular season
- Season MVP: (United States) Braydon Hobbs
- Promoted: Gießen, S.Oliver
- Relegated: Cuxhaven BasCats; Erdgas Ehingen/Urspr.schule

Finals
- Champions: Gießen 46ers (1st title)
- Runners-up: S.Oliver Baskets

Statistical leaders
Points	(United States) Brandon Johnson	21.9
Rebounds	(United States) Andre Calvin	9.8
Assists	(United States) Devon Moore	6.6

Records
- Average attendance: 2,359

The 2014–15 ProA, was the 8th season of the ProA, the second level of basketball in Germany. The champions and finalists of the league of the Playoffs were promoted to the 2015–16 Basketball Bundesliga. Gießen 46ers won its first ProA title.

== Teams ==
Relegated from the 2013–14 Basketball Bundesliga

- S.Oliver Baskets
- SC Rasta Vechta

Promoted from the ProB

- ~~Baskets Akademie Weser-Ems Oldenburger TB~~
- Bike-Café Messingschlager

Offered a wild card

- Hamburg Towers
Clubs of the Pro A 2014/15

Team	City
Bike-Café Messingschlager Baunach	Bamberg
BV Chemnitz 99	Chemnitz
Cuxhaven BasCats	Cuxhaven
Erdgas Ehingen/Urspringschule	Ehingen (Donau)
ETB Wohnbau Baskets	Essen
Gießen 46ers	Gießen
Oettinger Rockets	Gotha
Hamburg Towers	Hamburg-Wilhelmsburg
MLP Academics Heidelberg	Heidelberg
Science City Jena	Jena
Kirchheim Knights	Kirchheim unter Teck
Bayer Giants Leverkusen	Leverkusen
Nürnberger Basketball Club	Nürnberg
finke baskets	Paderborn
SC Rasta Vechta	Vechta
s.Oliver Baskets	Würzburg

== Standings ==
Pos	Team	W	L	PCT	GP	Qualification or relegation
1	S.Oliver Baskets	28	2	.933	30	Qualified for Playoffs
2	rent4office Nürnberg	22	8	.733	30	Qualified for Playoffs
3	Gießen 46ers	21	9	.700	30	Qualified for Playoffs
4	Science City Jena	18	12	.600	30	Qualified for Playoffs
5	Oettinger Rockets Gotha	17	13	.567	30	Qualified for Playoffs
6	MLP Academics Heidelberg	17	13	.567	30	Qualified for Playoffs
7	ETB Wohnbau Baskets	16	14	.533	30	Qualified for Playoffs
8	Hamburg Towers	15	15	.500	30	Qualified for Playoffs
9	Messingschlager Baunach	14	16	.467	30	
10	Rasta Vechta	12	18	.400	30	
11	Kirchheim Knights	12	18	.400	30	
12	finke baskets	11	19	.367	30	
13	Niners Chemnitz	11	19	.367	30	
14	Bayer Giants Leverkusen	10	20	.333	30	
15	Cuxhaven BasCats	10	20	.333	30	Relegated to ProB
16	Ehningen/Uspr.schule	6	24	.200	30	Relegated to ProB

== Playoffs ==
Quarterfinals
1	S.Oliver Baskets	3
8	Hamburg Towers	0
4	Science City Jena	1
5	Oettinger Rockets Gotha	3
2	rent4office Nürnberg	3
7	ETB Wohnbau Baskets	2
3	Gießen 46ers	3
6	MLP Academics Heidelberg	0

Semifinals
1	S.Oliver Baskets	3
5	Oettinger Rockets Gotha	1
2	rent4office Nürnberg	0
3	Gießen 46ers	3

Finals
1	S.Oliver Baskets	147
3	Gießen 46ers	150

Promoted to the 2015–16 Basketball Bundesliga
