= Gladiators Trier =

VET-CONCEPT Gladiators Trier
- Leagues: Basketball Bundesliga; Europe Cup
- Founded: 1990; 36 years ago (Note: From 1990 till 2015 TBB Trier existed. After its bankruptcy in 2015, a new team was founded in Gladiators Trier.)
- History: TBB Trier; 1990–2015; Gladiators Trier; 2015–present
- Arena: SWT-Arena
- Capacity: 5,495
- Location: Trier, Germany
- Team colors: Green, white
- Head coach: Jacques Schneider
- 2024–25 position: ProA, 1st of 18
- Championships: 2 German Cups; 1 ProA
- Website: vetconceptgladiators.de
Home	Away

Gladiators Trier, for sponsorship reasons known as VET-CONCEPT Gladiators Trier, is a professional basketball club based in Trier, Germany. The club plays in the Basketball Bundesliga since their promotion from the ProA in 2025. Its home arena is Trier Arena, which has a capacity of 5,495 people. From 1990 till 2015 the club existed in the form of TBB Trier, which went bankrupt.

== History ==
The club was founded as TBB Trier in 1990, and has played in the top division Basketball Bundesliga since the club's inception. They once were a part of the sports club TV Germania Trier, and became independent after promotion to the Basketball Bundesliga.

In the 2014–15 season, TBB relegated after it lost points in the standings because of financial problems. The club was dissolved after the season. However in the 2015 offseason, a new club was founded which was not the legal successor of TBB but inherited the club's license to play in the second tier ProA.

Gladiators Trier were promoted and returned to Basketball Bundesliga after their previous naming, TBB and the club's last participation during the 2014–15 season. They beat Science City Jena 2–0 in the finals of ProA during the 2024–25 season's playoffs and achieved its promotion and its return to the top–tier league after 10 years.

The TBB Trier logo (1990–2015)

== Trophies ==
- German Cup

Winners (2): 1998, 2001

- ProA

Winners: 2025

== Current roster ==
Gladiators Trier roster
Players
Coaches

Pos.	No.	Nat.	Name
G	1	(United States)	Crowley, Austin	1.96 m (6 ft 5 in)	83 kg (183 lb)	26 – 7 September 2000
PG	3	(Germany)	Hundt, Bennet	1.80 m (5 ft 11 in)	70 kg (154 lb)	28 – 20 August 1998
G	4	(United States)	Guillozet, Clayton	1.93 m (6 ft 4 in)	90 kg (198 lb)	29 – 25 May 1997
F	5	(United States)	Simon, Justin	1.94 m (6 ft 4 in)		30 – 6 May 1996
G	8	(Iran)	Yakhchali, Behnam	1.91 m (6 ft 3 in)	87 kg (192 lb)	30 – 31 December 1995
F	9	(Germany)	Hollersbacher, Marco	2.02 m (6 ft 8 in)	100 kg (220 lb)	25 – 29 October 2000
PG	10	(Germany)	Mpacko, Emanuel	1.86 m (6 ft 1 in)	82 kg (181 lb)	21 – 1 April 2005
F	12	(Germany)	Linssen, Marten	2.03 m (6 ft 8 in)	109 kg (240 lb)	28 – 30 August 1998
G	15	(United States)	Roland, Jordan	1.85 m (6 ft 1 in)	78 kg (172 lb)	29 – 15 January 1997
SG	21	(Germany)	Rapieque, Evans	1.93 m (6 ft 4 in)	81 kg (179 lb)	24 – 5 March 2002
PF	23	(Netherlands)	Manuel, Edney	2.03 m (6 ft 8 in)	102 kg (225 lb)	21 – 3 January 2005
F	27	(Germany)	Krimmer, Moritz	2.02 m (6 ft 8 in)	93 kg (205 lb)	26 – 27 August 2000
C	33	(Germany)	Zirbes, Maik	2.08 m (6 ft 10 in)	121 kg (267 lb)	36 – 29 January 1990
PF	35	(United States)	Onu, EJ	2.11 m (6 ft 11 in)	109 kg (240 lb)	27 – 31 July 1999
PG	55	(United States)	Brooks, Eli	1.85 m (6 ft 1 in)	84 kg (185 lb)	28 – 14 October 1998

Head coach

- (Germany) Jacques Schneider

Assistant coach(es)

- (Germany) Kevin Oberlack
- (Germany) Philipp Staiger

Legend

- (C) Team captain
- Injured

- Roster
Updated: September 21, 2026

Note: Flags indicate national team eligibility at FIBA-sanctioned events. Players may hold other non-FIBA nationalities not displayed.

== Season by season ==
Season	Tier	League	Pos.	Postseason	German Cup	European competitions
TBB Trier
1991–92	1	Bundesliga	4	Quarter-finalist	–	–
1992–93	1	Bundesliga	5	–	–	–
1993–94	1	Bundesliga	6	–	–	–
1994–95	1	Bundesliga	6	Relegation playoffs	–	–
1995–96	1	Bundesliga	9	Relegation playoffs	–	–
1996–97	1	Bundesliga	3	Semi-finalist	–	–
1997–98	1	Bundesliga	3	Semi-finalist	Champion	–
1998–99	1	Bundesliga	5	Quarter-finalist	–	–
1999–00	1	Bundesliga	5	Quarter-finalist	Semi-finalist	3 Played Korać Cup
2000–01	1	Bundesliga	9	Relegation playoffs	Champion	3 Played Korać Cup
2001–02	1	Bundesliga	11	Relegation playoffs	Fourth position	3 Played Korać Cup
2002–03	1	Bundesliga	14	Relegated	–	–
2003–04	1	Bundesliga	7	Quarter-finalist	Third position	–
2004–05	1	Bundesliga	11	–	–	–
2005–06	1	Bundesliga	9	–	–	–
2006–07	1	Bundesliga	15	–	–	–
2007–08	1	Bundesliga	17	Relegated	–	–
2008–09	1	Bundesliga	10	–	–	–
2009–10	1	Bundesliga	15	–	–	–
2010–11	1	Bundesliga	10	–	–	–
2011–12	1	Bundesliga	14	–	–	–
2012–13	1	Bundesliga	12	–	Quarter-finalist	–
2013–14	1	Bundesliga	13	–	–	–
2014–15	1	Bundesliga	17	Relegated	–	–
Gladiators Trier
2015–16	2	ProA	6	Quarter-finalist	–	–
2016–17	2	ProA	6	Quarter-finalist	–	–
2017–18	2	ProA	6	Semi-finalist	–	–
2018–19	2	ProA	9	–	–	–
2019–20	2	ProA	7	–	–	–
2020–21	2	ProA	9	–	–	–
2021–22	2	ProA	4	Quarter-finalist	–	–
2022–23	2	ProA	13	–	–	–
2023–24	2	ProA	1	Semi-finalist	–	–
2024–25	2	ProA	1	Champions	First round	–
2025–26	1	Bundesliga	8	Quarter-finalist	Quarterfinals	–
2026–27	1	Bundesliga			Round of 16	4 Europe Cup

== Notable players ==
Note: Flags indicate national team eligibility at FIBA-sanctioned events. Players may hold other non-FIBA nationalities not displayed.

Criteria

To appear in this section a player must have either:

- Set a club record or won an individual award while at the club
- Played at least one official international match for their national team at any time
- Played at least one official NBA match at any time.

- (Germany) Bastian Doreth
- (Germany) Maik Zirbes
- (Israel) Anton Shoutvin
- (United States) Chris Copeland
- (United States) Bernard Thompson

== Head coaches ==
Dates	Name
1994–2001	(United States) Don Beck
2015–2018	(Netherlands) Marco van den Berg
2018–2020	(Germany) Christian Held
2020–2022	(Netherlands) Marco van den Berg
2022–2023	(Germany) Pascal Heinrichs
2023	(Canada) Jermaine Bucknor
2023–2024	(United States) Don Beck
2024–present	(Germany) Jacques Schneider
