= Dennis Tinnon =

American former professional basketball player

Personal information
- Born: December 9, 1988 (age 37) Milwaukee, Wisconsin
- Listed height: 6 ft 8 in (2.03 m)
- Listed weight: 232 lb (105 kg)

Career information
- High school: Green Bay East (Green Bay, Wisconsin)
- College: Kansas City Kansas CC (2009–2011); Marshall (2011–2013)
- NBA draft: 2013: undrafted
- Playing career: 2013–2016
- Position: Power forward

Career history
- 2013–2014: Science City Jena
- 2014–2015: s.Oliver Würzburg
- 2014–2015: Rasta Vechta
- 2015–2016: VfL Kirchheim Knights

Dennis Lee Tinnon Jr. (born December 9, 1988) is an American former professional basketball player who last played for the VfL Kirchheim Knights of the Basketball Bundesliga. Tinnon played college basketball at Kansas City Kansas Community College and at Marshall.

== Early life ==
Tinnon was born in Milwaukee, Wisconsin to Celeste Eastwood and Dennis Tinnon Sr., the second-oldest (along with a fraternal twin, David) of five children. In 2003, Tinnon's mother moved the family to Green Bay in order to give her children a safer place to grow up, and she would divorce Tinnon Sr. (who was an absent father) a year later. Tinnon began attending Green Bay East High School, but was often truant as a freshman and was expelled for that and other behavioral issues and sent to an alternative high school. He returned as a sophomore and began to find success as a basketball player, but was charged with misdemeanor theft as a junior for stealing football tickets from the school office and expelled again. Tinnon received community service as a punishment and failed to complete it, thus he was sentenced to several weekends in jail in nearby Appleton. Tinnon's coach, a social studies teacher at the school, would pick up and drop off Tinnon at jail during his senior year and noted that Tinnon was "...a good kid, who was just liable to follow the wrong people." During Tinnon's senior season, he was named an honorable mention All-State basketball player as well as the Fox River Valley Conference defensive player of the year. Tinnon was unable to graduate as he was a semester short of credits, but received an offer from Williston State College, where fellow Green Bay East standout Harry Boyce began his college career, with the provision that he would study for a GED while training with the basketball team.

== College career ==
=== Williston State College ===
While at Williston, Tinnon failed to even attend a single practice, as he was dismissed from the program due to a misdemeanor reckless endangerment charge he incurred after he and a friend allegedly hit a bystander with an errant shot from a BB gun after using a stop sign for practice. According to a Sports Illustrated profile of Tinnon, "He did not like it [at Williston] and the coaches were no longer very fond of him, so there was a swift parting of ways." He returned to Green Bay, where he was informed that he had violated his probation via the incident in North Dakota. After avoiding police for several months, Tinnon's new girlfriend (and future wife) Robin convinced him to turn himself in, and he was sentenced to four months in jail.

=== Kansas City Kansas Community College ===
After Tinnon was released from jail, he began working at a local slaughterhouse to support his expectant girlfriend. In 2009, Derick Denny, a former standout at nearby Seymour Community High School who once played Tinnon in pickup games at a local YMCA, called on Tinnon to fill in for a local tribal basketball tournament. Denny was impressed with Tinnon's performance, and invited him to try out at Kansas City Kansas Community College, where Denny was a player. Since Tinnon had received his high school diploma in fall 2009, he was eligible to enroll at KCKCC, and after assistant coach Bill Sloan said that "it took him all of five minutes to be convinced" of Tinnon's ability, the newlywed family, with new daughter Denyah, moved to Kansas City. While at KCK, Tinnon and Denny were co-Most Valuable Players for the 2009–2010 season, and Tinnon averaged a 20-point, 10-rebound double-double as a sophomore, leading Sloan to designate Tinnon the best player in KCK's history.

=== Marshall University ===
Ranked the 20th best junior college prospect in the country, Tinnon was first recruited by then-head coach Tom Herrion at a junior college showcase in Tulsa, Oklahoma, and he quickly settled on Tinnon to fill a need for a low-post player. During his first season at Marshall in 2011–12, Tinnon became the first player to average a double-double for the Thundering Herd since the 2001 season (10.2 points and 10 rebounds). The Thundering Herd finished the season 21-14 (9-7 C-USA), tied for fourth in the conference. Despite this, they advanced to the conference championship, which they lost to Memphis. Marshall was invited to the National Invitation Tournament that year, but lost in the first round to Middle Tennessee. Tinnon was named to the Conference USA (C-USA) All-Tournament Team and All-Defensive Team after his first season, and was named a preseason all-C-USA second team player before the start of his second. Tinnon was originally slated to have one year of eligibility at Marshall because of his original enrollment at Williston State, but was granted an extra year of eligibility by the NCAA. In his second season, 2012–13, Tinnon averaged a near double-double (10.5 points and 9.1 rebounds) as Marshall finished 13-19 (6-10 C-USA), losing to Tulane in the first round of the conference tournament.

== Professional career ==
Tinnon declared for the 2013 NBA draft, and was considered to be at best a late-second round pick likely to play overseas in Europe. Tinnon was invited to work out with the Brooklyn Nets and Milwaukee Bucks, though he only completed his workout for the Nets. Tinnon eventually went undrafted, but played for three years in the Basketball Bundesliga for Science City Jena, S.Oliver Würzburg, SC Rasta Vechta, and VfL Kirchheim Knights, respectively. In his three seasons in the Basketball Bundesliga, Tinnon averaged 8.5 points, 7 rebounds, and 1.2 assists.

== Personal life ==
Tinnon married Robin Hall in 2007, and had a son and a daughter with her. They divorced in 2019.

Tinnon was named by the Green Bay Press-Gazette as one of the greatest athletes at Green Bay East in the first 20 years of the 21st century.
