= Nathan Scott (disambiguation) =

Nathan Scott is a fictional character on One Tree Hill.

Nathan Scott may also refer to:

- Nathan Scott (basketball) (born 1999), American player
- Nathan Scott (composer) (1915–2010), film and television composer
- Nathan A. Scott Jr. (1925–2006), literary scholar
- Nathan B. Scott (1842–1924), U.S. politician
