= 2018–19 ProA =

ProA
- Season: 2018–19

Regular season
- Promoted: Hamburg Towers; ~~Nürnberg Falcons~~
- Relegated: White Wings Hanau; Baunach Young Pikes

Finals
- Champions: Hamburg Towers (1st title)
- Runners-up: Nürnberg Falcons

Records
- Average attendance: 2,279 ▲

The 2018–19 ProA was the 12th season of the ProA, the second level of basketball in Germany. The champions and the runners-up of the play-offs were promoted to the 2019–20 Basketball Bundesliga.

Hamburg Towers won its first ProA championship after defeating Nürnberg Falcons, which promoted too, in the finals. Nürnberg did not promote after all after it could not meet Basketball Bundesliga (BBL) BBL arena requirements.

== Teams ==
Clubs of the Pro A 2018/19

| Team | City |
|---|---|
| Artland Dragons | Quakenbrück |
| Bike-Café Messingschlager Baunach | Bamberg |
| FC Schalke 04 Basketball | Gelsenkirchen |
| Hamburg Towers | Hamburg-Wilhelmsburg |
| Hebeisen White Wings Hanau | Hanau |
| MLP Academics Heidelberg | Heidelberg |
| NINERS Chemnitz | Chemnitz |
| Nürnberg Falcons BC | Nürnberg |
| Phoenix Hagen | Hagen |
| PS Karlsruhe LIONS | Karlsruhe |
| Rostock Seawolves | Rostock |
| Römerstrom Gladiators Trier | Trier |
| Team Ehingen Urspring | Ehingen |
| Tigers Tübingen | Tübingen |
| Uni Baskets Paderborn | Paderborn |
| VFL Kirchheim Knights | Kirchheim unter Teck |

== Table ==
| # | Team | Wins | Losses | Points for/against | Points |
|---|---|---|---|---|---|
| 1 | NINERS Chemnitz | 24 | 6 | 2513:2303 | 48 |
| 2 | MLP Academics Heidelberg | 19 | 11 | 2371:2210 | 38 |
| 3 | Nürnberg Falcons BC | 19 | 11 | 2341:2244 | 38 |
| 4 | Hamburg Towers | 19 | 11 | 2498:2279 | 38 |
| 5 | Rostock Seawolves (N) | 18 | 12 | 2394:2333 | 36 |
| 6 | RÖMERSTROM Gladiators Trier | 17 | 13 | 2373:2436 | 34 |
| 7 | Team Ehingen Urspring | 17 | 13 | 2547:2436 | 34 |
| 8 | PS Karlsruhe Lions | 16 | 14 | 2416:2363 | 32 |
| 9 | Tigers Tübingen (A) | 15 | 15 | 2570:2580 | 30 |
| 10 | Phoenix Hagen | 15 | 15 | 2469:2416 | 30 |
| 11 | Artland Dragons (N) | 14 | 16 | 2411:2448 | 28 |
| 12 | Kirchheim Knights | 14 | 16 | 2256:2268 | 28 |
| 13 | Uni Baskets Paderborn | 10 | 20 | 2372:2520 | 20 |
| 14 | FC Schalke 04 (N) | 9 | 21 | 2208:2360 | 18 |
| 15 | HEBEISEN White Wings Hanau | 8 | 22 | 2260:2473 | 16 |
| 16 | Baunach Young Pikes | 6 | 24 | 2177:2510 | 12 |

| = Playoff qualification |
| = Relegated |

== Play-offs ==
Quarter-finals
Niners Chemnitz | 3
PS Karlsruhe Lions | 0
Hamburg Towers | 3
Rostock Seawolves | 1
Nürnberg Falcons | 3
Gladiators Trier | 0
MLP Academics Heidelberg | 3
Ehingen Urspring | 0

Semi-finals
Niners Chemnitz | 2
Hamburg Towers | 3
Nürnberg Falcons | 3
MLP Academics Heidelberg | 1

Final
Hamburg Towers | 87 | 99
Nürnberg Falcons | 90 | 94
