= David Hicks (basketball) =

American basketball player (born 1988)

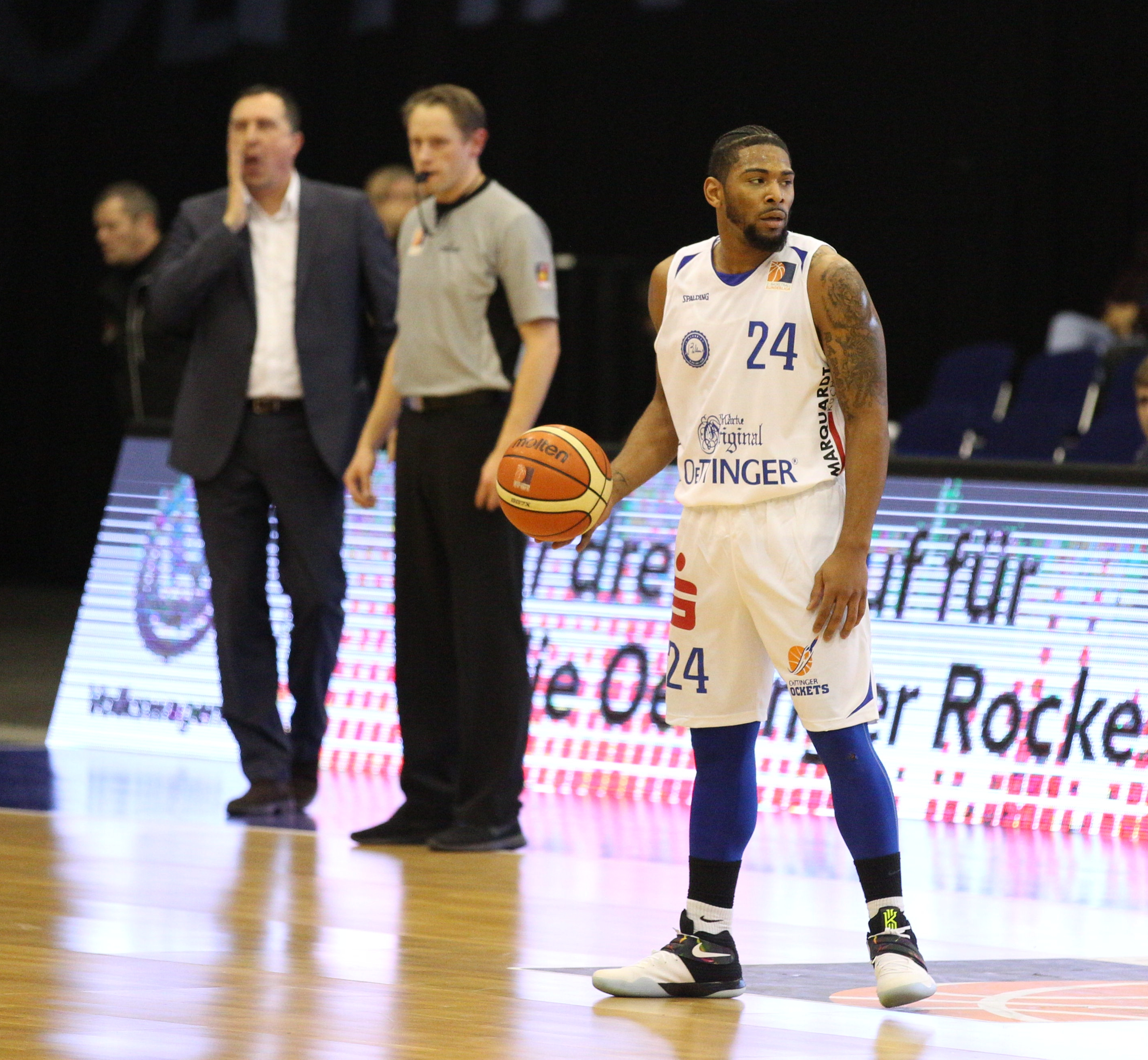
- David Hicks in 2017

No. 24 – free agent
- Position: Point guard

Personal information
- Born: August 1, 1988 (age 38) Mendota Heights, Minnesota
- Listed height: 6 ft 0 in (1.83 m)
- Listed weight: 195 lb (88 kg)

Career information
- High school: South Kent School (South Kent, Connecticut)
- College: LIU Brooklyn (2007–2012)
- NBA draft: 2011: undrafted
- Playing career: 2011–present

Career history
- 2012–2013: UBC Münster
- 2013–2014: SG Schwelmer Baskets
- 2014–2015: Science City Jena
- 2015: Ironi Nahariya
- 2016: Liepaja/Triobet
- 2017: Oettinger Rockets
- 2017: Iowa Wolves
- 2017: Schwelmer Baskets

David Hicks (born August 1, 1988) is an American professional basketball player, currently a free agent.

== College career ==
David Hicks was a key member of the 2010 Long Island University, which made it to the 2011 NCAA basketball tournament. During his college career Hicks made 123 starts in the backcourt and finished his career with 1,157 points.

== Professional career ==
After going undrafted in 2011, Hicks moved to Germany and played for UBC Münster, SG Schwelmer Baskets and Science City Jena. While there, he received player of the week honors while on the SG Schwelmer Baskets. On July 25, 2015 he signed to play with Ironi Nahariya after playing for Science City Jena. Following a stop in Latvia (Liepaja/Triobet), Hicks returned to Germany, signing with the Gotha Rockets in February 2017. He helped them reach the 2017 2. Bundesliga ProA finals and earn promotion to the top-tier Basketball Bundesliga. Hicks scored 13.8 points a game for the Rockets that season. In October 2017, he joined the Iowa Wolves in the NBA G League. After being waived, he returned to Germany, joining Schwelmer Baskets on November 24, 2017. He signed a one-month deal as an injury-replacement and appeared in four games with Schwelm, averaging 25.5 points, 4.8 rebounds as well as 4 assists per outing.
