= Nathan Scott (basketball) =

American basketball player (born 1999)

No. 25 – Uni Baskets Münster
- Position: Forward
- League: ProA

Personal information
- Born: 25 March 1999 (age 27) Naperville, Illinois, US
- Listed height: 2.03 m (6 ft 8 in)

Career information
- College: Olney Central (2017–2019); Northern Illinois (2019–2021); Eastern Michigan (2021–2022)
- Playing career: 2018–present

Career history
- 2022: theView Copenhagen
- 2022–2023: Randers Cimbria
- 2023–present: Uni Baskets Münster

Nathan Scott is an American professional basketball player for Uni Baskets Münster of the German ProA league.

He measures 2.03 meters and plays as Forward.

== Early life ==
Nathan Scott was born in Naperville, Illinois, in 1999. He has three brothers and two sisters.

== College career ==
From 2017 onwards, Nathan Scott played 102 games for three college basketball teams. He played two years each for the Blue Knights of Olney Central College and the Huskies of Northern Illinois University as well as for the 2021/22 Eastern Michigan University Eagles. With the Eagles, he distinguished himself as the best defensive and overall rebounder.

Scott earned a bachelor's degree in General Studies from Illinois University and a master's degree in Sports Management from Eastern Michigan University.

== Professional career ==
Scott played for the Danish first division club Randers Cimbria.

He joined Uni Baskets Münster for the 2023-24 ProA season.

== Player profile ==
Münster's Head Coach Götz Rohdewald stated that Scott is "an athletic and agile player who will help us a lot in defense and rebounding. I think he can be deployed quite flexibly and will be able to provide impetus in many areas." Further, Scott has been described as a player with a good basketball IQ.
