= Dan Oppland =

American basketball player

SSV Lokomotive Bernau
- Title: Assistant coach
- League: ProB

Personal information
- Born: January 7, 1984 (age 42) St. Louis, Missouri, US
- Listed height: 6 ft 8 in (2.03 m)

Career information
- College: Valparaiso (2002–2006)
- NBA draft: 2006: undrafted
- Playing career: 2006–2022
- Position: Power forward
- Number: 42
- Coaching career: 2022–present

Career history

Playing
- 2006–2007: Donar
- 2007: AZS Koszalin
- 2007–2008: Plannja
- 2008–2009: Bayreuth
- 2009–2013: Swans Gmunden
- 2013–2014: Namika Lahti
- 2014–2018: Nürnberg Falcons
- 2018–2019: MLP Academics Heidelberg
- 2019–2022: SSV Lokomotive Bernau

Coaching
- 2022–2024: Lokomotive Bernau (assistant)
- 2024–present: Lokomotive Bernau

Career highlights
- As player: ÖBL champion (2010); 3× Austrian Cup winner (2010–2012)

Dan Oppland (born 7 January 1984) is an American basketball coach and former player. A standout player for Valparaiso, he is the third all-time leading scorer for the Beacons, having scored 1,780 points.

From 2006 to 2022, he played professionally in Europe, spending most of his time with the Swans Gmunden in Austria and for several clubs in Germany.

== Professional career ==
Oppland started his professional career in the Dutch Eredivisie for Donar (then named Hanzevast Capitals after their sponsor). The following season, he played for Plannja Basket in Sweden and also played European basketball with the team.

In January 2008, Oppland signed with Bayreuth of the German second-level ProA.

The next season, he signed in Austria with Swans Gmunden and won the 2010 Austrian Leagues with them. He averaged 13 points per game in four seasons for Gmunden, 14.9 points in his final season.

After a stint in Finland for Namika Lahti, Oppland returned to Germany when he signed for Nürnberg Falcons BC.

In May 2018, he signed for MLP Academics Heidelberg. After one year in Heidelberg, he signed for SSV Lokomotive Bernau of the third-tier ProB. He retired in 2022, starting his coaching career with Bernau.

== Coaching career ==
In July 2021, while playing for Lokomotive Bernau, Oppland obtained his B-coaching license. In the 2021–22 season, he coached Brenau's under-20 team of the JBBL.

In June 2022, Oppland ended his playing career and became the assistant coach of Lokomotive Bernau, under promoted Davide Bottinelli. Oppland was promoted to head coach in Bernau in the summer of 2024.

== Personal ==
Dan has a twin brother, Mike (born 1984), who also played for the Swans Gmunden in the 2011–12 and 2012–13 seasons.
