= 2025–26 ProA =

ProA
- Season: 2025–26
- Dates: 26. September 2025 – 7. Juni 2026
- Teams: 18
- TV partner: Sporteurope.TV

Regular season
- Season MVP: (United States) Ben Burnham

Finals
- Champions: Phoenix Hagen (1st title)
- Runners-up: Bozic Estriche Knights Kirchheim

The 2025–26 ProA is the 19th season of the ProA, the second level of basketball in Germany. The champions and the runners-up of the play-offs will promote to the 2026–27 Basketball Bundesliga.

== Teams ==
In the 2025-26 season, 18 teams participated in the ProA.

Due to the BBL only consisting of 17 teams in the 2024-25 season, only BG Göttingen was demoted from the BBL. With the 2 finalists promoting to the BBL and 3 teams pulling back their license for the ProA, the league had space for four teams to be promoted from the ProB. These teams were Bayer Giants Leverkusen, SBB Baskets, RheinStars Köln and Paderborn Baskets.

Clubs of the ProA 2025/26

Team	City
BBC Bayreuth	Bayreuth
VfL SparkassenStars Bochum	Bochum
Eisbären Bremerhaven	Bremerhaven
HAKRO Merlins Crailsheim	Ilshofen
GIESSEN 46ers	Gießen
BG Göttingen	Göttingen
Phoenix Hagen	Hagen
PS Karlsruhe LIONS	Karlsruhe
Bozic Estriche Knights Kirchheim	Kirchheim unter Teck
EPG Baskets Koblenz	Koblenz
RheinStars Köln	Köln
Bayer Giants Leverkusen	Leverkusen
SBB Baskets Wolmirstedt	Magdeburg
Uni Baskets Münster	Münster
Nürnberg Falcons BC	Nürnberg
Paderborn Baskets	Paderborn
Artland Dragons	Quakenbrück
Tigers Tübingen	Tübingen

== Regular season ==
The regular season took place from the 26th of September until the 2nd of May 2026, consisting of 34 gamedays.

After the regular season, Phoenix Hagen was ranked first and thus secured homecourt advantage in all play-off rounds.

#	Team	Games	Won	Lost	Points made	Difference	Points
1	Phoenix Hagen	34	28	6	3277:2832	445	56
2	HAKRO Merlins Crailsheim	34	28	6	3035:2683	352	56
3	BG Göttingen	34	23	11	2989:2731	258	46
4	Eisbären Bremerhaven	34	23	11	2889:2718	171	46
5	Artland Dragons	34	21	13	3096:2965	131	42
6	Bozic Estriche Knights Kirchheim	34	20	14	2865:2757	108	40
7	GIESSEN 46ers	34	18	16	2876:2714	162	36
8	PS Karlsruhe LIONS	34	17	17	2781:2872	−91	34
9	Nürnberg Falcons BC	34	16	18	2818:2777	41	32
10	BBC Bayreuth	34	15	19	2859:2920	−61	30
11	VfL SparkassenStars Bochum	34	15	19	2847:2946	−99	30
12	RheinStars Köln	34	14	20	2777:2891	−114	28
13	Tigers Tübingen	34	13	21	2754:2887	−133	26
14	EPG Baskets Koblenz	34	13	21	2903:3079	−176	26
15	SBB Baskets Wolmirstedt	34	12	22	2753:2893	−140	24
16	Paderborn Baskets	34	12	22	2725:2986	−261	24
17	Bayer Giants Leverkusen	34	10	24	2697:2929	−232	20
18	Uni Baskets Münster	34	8	26	2578:2939	−361	16

Play-off-Position (Places 1 to 8)
Relegated (Place 17 and 18)

== Playoffs ==
Quarterfinals
1	Phoenix Hagen	3
8	PS Karlsruhe LIONS	0
4	Eisbären Bremerhaven	3
5	Artland Dragons	0
2	HAKRO Merlins Crailsheim	1
7	GIESSEN 46ers	3
3	BG Göttingen	1
6	Bozic Estriche Knights Kirchheim	3

Semifinals
1	Phoenix Hagen	3
4	Eisbären Bremerhaven	2
6	Bozic Estriche Knights Kirchheim	3
7	GIESSEN 46ers	1

Finals
1	Phoenix Hagen	175
6	Bozic Estriche Knights Kirchheim	168

=== Quarterfinals ===
Team 1	Series	Team 2	Game 1	Game 2	Game 3	Game 4	Game 5
Phoenix Hagen	3–0	PS Karlsruhe LIONS	90-66	108-73	79-70	—	—
Eisbären Bremerhaven	3–0	Artland Dragons	78-74	86-84	117-112	—	—
HAKRO Merlins Crailsheim	1–3	GIESSEN 46ers	77-89	79-89	88-86	87-70	—
BG Göttingen	1–3	Bozic Estriche Knights Kirchheim	99-87	67-81	82-89	85-90	—

=== Semifinals ===
Team 1	Series	Team 2	Game 1	Game 2	Game 3	Game 4	Game 5
Phoenix Hagen	3–2	Eisbären Bremerhaven	85-80	80-87	83-78	75-85	85-65
Bozic Estriche Knights Kirchheim	3–1	GIESSEN 46ers	77-90	91-75	91-63	89-85	—

=== Finals ===
Team 1	Agg.	Team 2	1st leg	2nd leg
Phoenix Hagen	175-168	Bozic Estriche Knights Kirchheim	82-86	93-82
