= Andaç Yapıcıer =

Turkish basketball coach (born 1984)

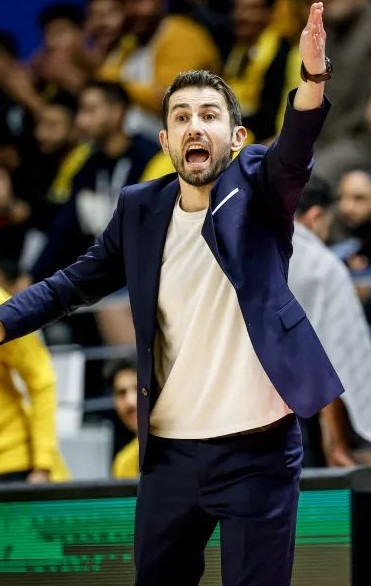

Al Wasl - Dubai
- Position: Head coach
- League: FIBA West Asia Super League, UAE Basketball League

Personal information
- Born: 18 December 1984 (age 41) Kırklareli, Turkey
- Coaching career: 2005–present

Career history

Coaching
- 2005–2015: Anadolu Efes Youth Team
- 2016–2017: Pertevniyal
- 2017–2018: Sigortam.net Bakırköy Basket
- 2018–2020: Sigortam.net İTÜ
- 2020–2022: Sigortam.net Basketball
- 2023–2023: Al-Ahli Club (Bahrain)
- 2023-2024: ART Giants Düsseldorf
- 2025-2025: Al-Ahli Club (Bahrain)
- 2025-2026: Qatar National Basketball Team (Assistant coach)
- 2025-2026: Qadsia Kuwait
- 2026-present: Al Wasl Dubai

Career highlights
- As head coach: Turkish Basketball League Play-Off Final (2018-19); Turkish Basketball League Federation Cup Champion (2020-21); Turkish Basketball League Play-Off Semi-Final (2021-22); Bahrain Premier League Play-Off Final (2024-25); Kuwait Basketball League Super Cup Final (2025-26); As youth team head coach: U14 Turkish National Champion (2010-11); 3× U16 Turkish National Champion (2012-13, 2013-14, 2014-15)

Andaç Yapıcıer (born 18 December 1984) is a Turkish professional basketball coach, who is currently the head coach of Dubai-based club Al Wasl SC of the UAE National Basketball League season.

== Coaching career ==
=== Anadolu Efes Youth Teams (2005–2015) ===
Yapıcıer began his coaching career at Anadolu Efes youth program in 2005. He won National Championship Cup four times as a head coach. He coached three NBA players at Anadolu Efes who are Onuralp Bitim - Chicago Bulls, Furkan Korkmaz - Philadelphia Sixers and Cedi Osman - San Antonio Spurs and reached the championship titles with them.

=== Pertevniyal (2016–2017) ===
He signed with Pertevniyal of the Turkish Basketball League. Pertevniyal was the lowest budget of the Turkish Basketball League so far. The season finished as planned with success. Ege Arar and Nedim Yücel were the important players of the team.

=== Sigortam.net Bakırköy (2017–2018) ===
Yapıcıer signed a three-year contract and became the head coach of Sigortam.net Bakırköy. Onuralp Bitim was one of the important player of the team and helped Yapıcıer's team success in Turkish Basketball League.

=== Sigortam.net ITU (2018–2020) ===
After 2017–2018 season the club with new name reached the play-off finals that was one of the lowest budget at the Turkish Basketball League. Former Turkish National Team player Cenk Akyol helped the team success.

Yapıcıer had a successful season with the team which finished the play-off final in the second place. After that Turkish Basketball Federation invited the club to Basketbol Super League.

Sigortam.net ITU was one of the lowest budget of the Basketbol Super League. Former NBA player Archie Goodwin was one of the important player of the team. Due to the COVID-19 pandemic, it was declared that the 2019–2020 season was cancelled by the Turkish Basketball Federation.

=== Sigortam.net Basketball (2020–2022) ===
Sigortam.net was the new member of Turkish Basketball League which took the license of Bandırma Kırmızı. After that the club signed two-year contract with Yapıcıer. In his first season he won the 2020 Federation Cup title following an 84–76 win over Semt77 Yalovaspor in the Final.

Yapıcıer's team was the best defensive team in the regular season of 2021–2022. He reached the semi-final of Turkish Basketball League Play-Off.

=== Al-Ahli Manama Bahrain (2023–2023) ===
Al-Ahli Manama agreed terms with Turkish coach for 2023–24 season. Yapıcıer's team was the leader of Bahrain Premier League before he accepted the offer from ART Giants Düsseldorf.

=== ART Giants Düsseldorf (2023–2024) ===
During the 2023–2024 season Andaç Yapıcıer signed with ART Giants Düsseldorf after buy-out process to Bahrain Club. The season finished as planned with staying in the league and success. On November 13, 2024, he left ART Giants Düsseldorf.

=== Al-Ahli Manama Bahrain (2025–2025) ===
On October 22, 2025, Andaç Yapıcıer signed with FIBA West Asia Super League and Bahrain Premier League team Al-Ahli Manama for the rest of the season.

The team was fourth place in the standing in January. Then the club reached the final by eliminating the league champion of the past three years and FIBA West Asia Super League champion Manama, with 2–0 victory in the semifinals.

=== Qatar National Basketball Team (2025–2026) ===
On June 7, 2025, had an agreement with Qatar National Basketball Team as an assistant coach.

=== Qadsia SC Kuwait (2025–2026) ===
Qadsia SC of the Kuwaiti Basketball League team agreed terms with Turkish coach for 2025–26 season as the head coach position.

On October 13, 2025, Coach Yapıcıer led his team with a 94–93 overtime victory against Kazma in the semi-final of the Kuwait Super Cup and secured a place in the final.

=== Al Wasl SC Dubai (2026–present) ===
In August 2026, Yapıcıer signed a one-year contract to become the head coach of Dubai-based club Al Wasl SC for the 2026–27 UAE National Basketball League season.
