= Eisbären Bremerhaven =

German professional basketball club

- Leagues: ProA
- Founded: 2001; 25 years ago
- History: Eisbären Bremerhaven (2001–present)
- Arena: Bremerhaven Stadthalle
- Capacity: 6,000
- Location: Bremerhaven, Germany
- Team colors: White, Navy Blue, Orange, Grey
- Head coach: Steven Esterkamp
- Team captain: Adrian Breitlauch
- Website: www.dieeisbaeren.de
Home	Away

Eisbären Bremerhaven (English: Polar Bears Bremerhaven) is a professional basketball club from Bremerhaven, Germany, that competes in the ProA. The team was established as the professional section of the club BSG Bremerhaven and played in the first-tiered Basketball Bundesliga (BBL) between 2005 and 2019.

The club plays its home games in the Bremerhaven Stadthalle, which has a capacity for 6,000 people.

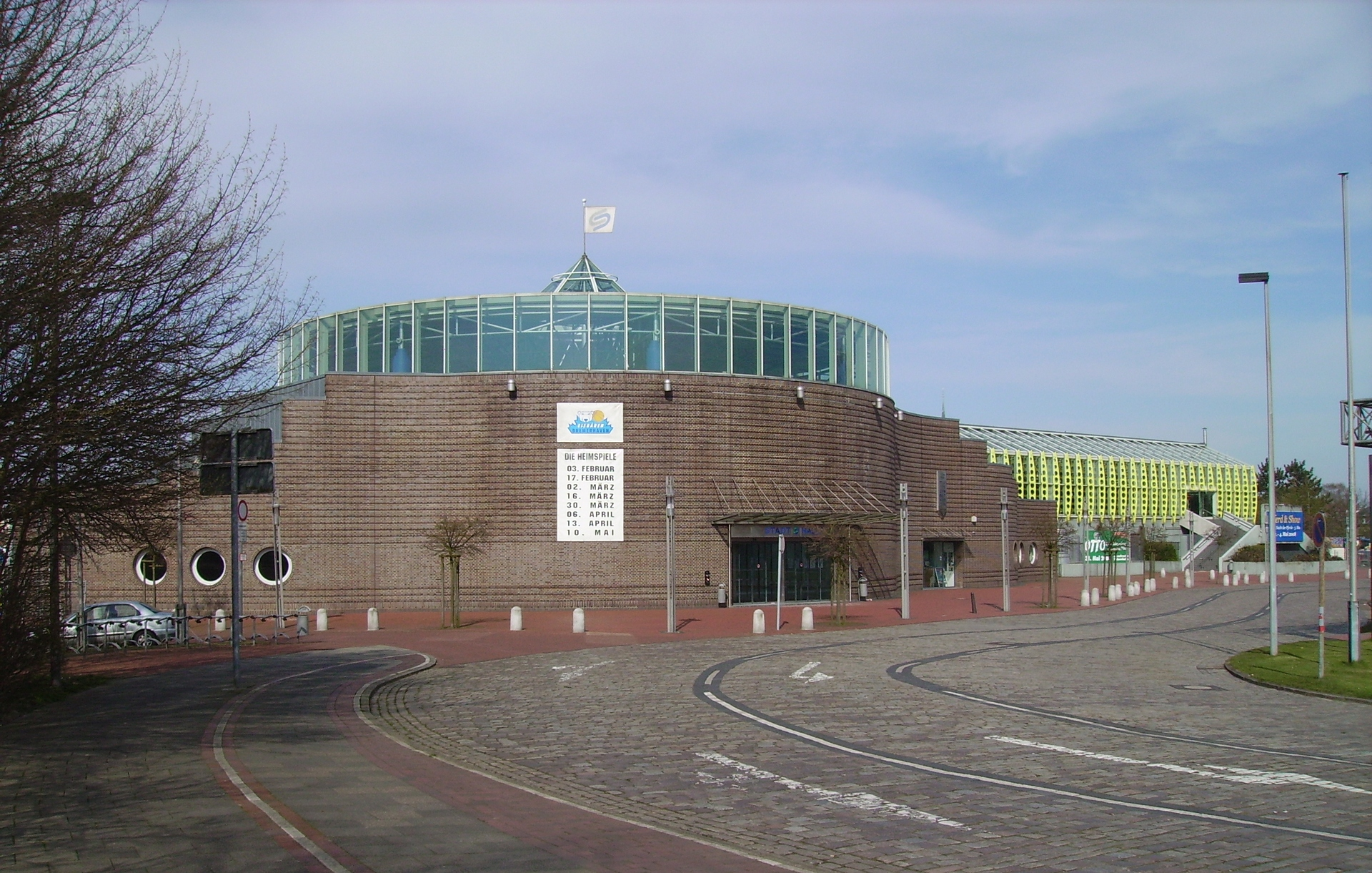
The Bremerhaven Stadthalle, the home arena of the club

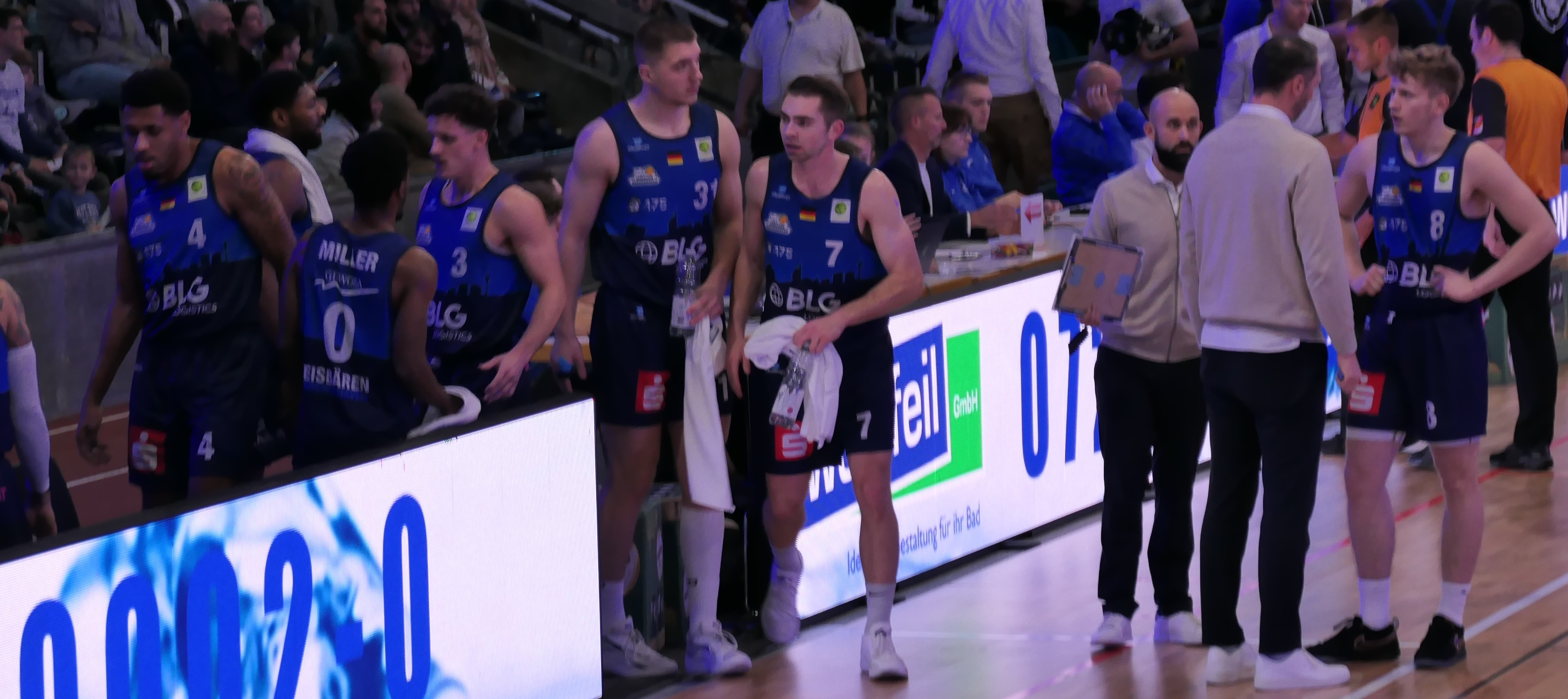
Eisbären huddle in November 2024.

== History ==
OSC Bremerhaven previously played in the 2nd Basketball Bundesliga from the 1981/1982 season to the 1985/1986 season and won promotion to the North Division of the 2nd Basketball Bundesliga in the 1985/1986 season.

In 2004–05, Eisbären won the 2. Basketball Bundesliga, which earned them promotion to the BBL. Following the 2018–19 season, Eisbären were relegated to the ProA.

== Season by season ==
Season	Tier	League	Pos.	German Cup
2000–01	2	2. BBL	8th	
2001–02	2	2. BBL	6th	
2002–03	2	2. BBL	3rd	
2003–04	2	2. BBL	2nd	
2004–05	2	2. BBL	1st	
2005–06	1	Bundesliga	4th	
2006–07	1	Bundesliga	6th	Fourth position
2007–08	1	Bundesliga	8th	Third position
2008–09	1	Bundesliga	18th	
2009–10	1	Bundesliga	5th	Third position
2010–11	1	Bundesliga	3rd	
2011–12	1	Bundesliga	11th	
2012–13	1	Bundesliga	11th	
2013–14	1	Bundesliga	12th	
2014–15	1	Bundesliga	15th	
2015–16	1	Bundesliga	15th	
2016–17	1	Bundesliga	12th	
2017–18	1	Bundesliga	16th	
2018–19	1	Bundesliga	17th	
2019–20	2	ProA	2nd (Note: The 2019–20 season was curtailed due to the COVID-19 pandemic. Based on results at the time, Eisbären was eligible to promote but refused.)	
2020–21	2	ProA	3rd	
2021–22	2	ProA	8th	
2022–23	2	ProA	7th	
2023–24	2	ProA	10th	
2024–25	2	ProA	6th	
2025–26	2	ProA	3rd	First round
2026–27	2	ProA		First round

== Players ==
=== Current roster ===
Note: Flags indicate national team eligibility at FIBA-sanctioned events. Players may hold other non-FIBA nationalities not displayed.

Eisbären Bremerhaven roster
Players
Coaches

Pos.	No.	Nat.	Name	Ht.	Wt.	Age
G	0	(United States)	Blunt, Tyreese	1.90 m (6 ft 3 in)	86 kg (190 lb)	24 – 3 June 2002
G	2	(United States)	McKeithan, Corey	1.83 m (6 ft 0 in)	79 kg (174 lb)	25 – 7 August 2001
PG	3	(Germany)	Zeeb, Garai	1.87 m (6 ft 2 in)	79 kg (174 lb)	29 – 6 April 1997
PF	4	(Germany)	Samare, Jordan	2.02 m (6 ft 8 in)	105 kg (231 lb)	24 – 12 January 2002
SF	5	(Germany)	Zintz, Benjamin	2.00 m (6 ft 7 in)	86 kg (190 lb)	19 – 31 January 2007
PF	6	(United States)	Carter, Carlos	1.96 m (6 ft 5 in)	90 kg (198 lb)	27 – 28 October 1999
G	8	(Canada)	Jahan, Sami	1.85 m (6 ft 1 in)	75 kg (165 lb)	26 – 29 June 2000
C	9	(Germany)	Parolin, Dominic	2.06 m (6 ft 9 in)	111 kg (245 lb)	23 – 14 December 2002
F/C	11	(United States)	Smith, Andrew	2.06 m (6 ft 9 in)	100 kg (220 lb)	33 – 14 December 1992
C	14	(Germany)	Stelmokas, Lukas	2.04 m (6 ft 8 in)	98 kg (216 lb)	18 – 21 November 2007
G	19	(Germany)	Meyer, Anton	1.87 m (6 ft 2 in)	79 kg (174 lb)	21 – 22 February 2005
F	21	(Germany)	Blakaj, Alen	2.00 m (6 ft 7 in)	95 kg (209 lb)	19 – 11 June 2007
F	25	(United States)	Oden, Jeremiah	2.03 m (6 ft 8 in)	98 kg (216 lb)	24 – 9 February 2002
PG	30	(Germany)	Friederici, Vincent	1.90 m (6 ft 3 in)	69 kg (152 lb)	25 – 30 March 2001
C	31	(Germany)	Warner, Hendrik	2.08 m (6 ft 10 in)	108 kg (238 lb)	24 – 22 February 2002
G	32	(United States)	Hodge, Nolan	2.01 m (6 ft 7 in)	86 kg (190 lb)	22 – 2 March 2004

Head coach

(Belgium) Ferried Naciri

Assistant coach(es)

(France) Davide Bottinelli

Legend

- (C) Team captain
- Injured

- Roster
Updated: November 11, 2026

=== Individual awards ===
BBL Best Offensive Player

- Darius Adams: 2014

=== Notable players ===
Note: Flags indicate national team eligibility at FIBA-sanctioned events. Players may hold other non-FIBA nationalities not displayed.

Criteria

To appear in this section a player must have either:

- Set a club record or won an individual award while at the club
- Played at least one official international match for their national team at any time
- Played at least one official NBA match at any time.

- (Germany) Konstantin Konga
- (Germany) Sven Schultze
- (Israel) Adam Ariel
- (Lithuania) Evaldas Jocys
- (Latvia) Ivars Timermanis
- (Poland) Geoffrey Groselle
- (United States) Darius Adams
- (United States) Ethan Alvano
- (United States) Adam Chubb
- (United States) Louis Campbell
- (United States) DeAndre Liggins
- (United States) Carrington Love
- (United States) Armani Moore
- (United States) Marcus Slaughter
- (United States Virgin Islands) Frank Elegar

== Head coaches ==
- (Lithuania) Šarūnas Sakalauskas (2001–2009)
- (United States) Michael Mai (2019–2022)
- (United States) Allen Ray Smith (2022)
- (United States) Steven Key (2022–2024)
- (United States) Steven Esterkamp (2024–2026)
- (Belgium) Ferried Naciri (2026–present)
