= Giessen 46ers =

Professional basketball club based in Gießen, Germany

- Nickname: MTV Gießen
- Leagues: ProA
- Founded: 1937; 89 years ago
- History: MTV 1846 Gießen; 1937–1993; Gießen Flippers; 1993–2000; Avitos Gießen; 2000–2003; Gießen 46ers 2003–present
- Arena: Sporthalle Gießen-Ost
- Capacity: 4,003
- Location: Gießen, Germany
- Team colors: Red, White, Black
- President: Michael Koch
- Head coach: Branislav Ignjatovic
- Team captain: Robin Benzing
- Championships: 5 German Championships; 3 German Cups; 1 German 2nd League
- Website: Team site
Home	Away	Third

The Giessen 46ers (or Gießen 46ers) are a professional basketball club based in Gießen, Germany, that plays in the ProA. Their home arena is Sporthalle Gießen-Ost, with a capacity of 4,003 people.

== History ==
The biggest achievements in club history are five German Championships (1965, 1967, 1968, 1975, 1978). Besides that, the 46ers have won the German Cup three times (1969, 1973, 1979). The most recent achievements were an appearance in the BBL semi-finals in 2005, when the team lost the series 1–3, to the eventual champion GHP Bamberg, and the third place in the BBL Cup in 2006.

In the 2012–13 season, the 46ers relegated from the Bundesliga for the first time. In the 2014–15 season, they were crowned the ProA champions and promoted back to the highest tier.

They are known in the USA for having been the team for which professional wrestler Kevin Nash (also known as Diesel) played for prior to a career ending knee injury.

== Honours ==
- German Championship

Winners (5): 1965, 1967, 1968, 1975, 1978

- German Cup

Winners (3): 1969, 1973, 1979
Runners-up (2): 1980, 1987

== Season by season ==
Season	Tier	Division	Pos.	German Cup	European Competitions
2008–09	1	Bundesliga	17th (Note: Gießen eventually did not relegate.)		
2009–10	1	Bundesliga	14th		
2010–11	1	Bundesliga	15th		
2011–12	1	Bundesliga	17th		
2012–13	1	Bundesliga	18th		
2013–14	2	ProA	3rd		
2014–15	2	ProA	1st		
2015–16	1	Bundesliga	9th		
2016–17	1	Bundesliga	9th		
2017–18	1	Bundesliga	11th		
2018–19	1	Bundesliga	13th	Round of 16	
2019–20	1	Bundesliga	13th	Round of 16	
2020–21	1	Bundesliga	17th	Group stage	
2021–22	1	Bundesliga	18th		
2022–23	2	ProA	4th		
2023–24	2	ProA	5th	Round of 16	
2024–25	2	ProA	3rd	First round	
2025–26	2	ProA	4th	First round	
2026–27	2	ProA		First round	

== Team ==
=== Current roster ===
Note: Flags indicate national team eligibility at FIBA-sanctioned events. Players may hold other non-FIBA nationalities not displayed.

Gießen 46ers roster
Players
Coaches

Pos.	No.	Nat.	Name	Ht.	Age
G	1	(United States)	Scantlebury, Nigel	1.82 m (6 ft 0 in)	26 – 10 March 2000
G	2	(Germany)	Genius, Elias	1.86 m (6 ft 1 in)	17 – 13 April 2009
G	3	(United States)	Cooks, Zach	1.80 m (5 ft 11 in)	27 – 4 March 1999
G	5	(United States) (Germany)	Carter, Chris	1.88 m (6 ft 2 in)	34 – 7 May 1992
SF	6	(United States)	Williams, Alexander	1.96 m (6 ft 5 in)	24 – 22 July 2002
G	11	(Germany)	Nickel, Luca-Noel	1.85 m (6 ft 1 in)	17 – 26 February 2009
PF	12	(Germany)	Benzing, Robin (C)	2.10 m (6 ft 11 in)	37 – 25 January 1989
G	13	(Germany) (United States)	Norl, Daniel	1.88 m (6 ft 2 in)	31 – 7 March 1995
SF	14	(Germany)	König Figge, Luis	1.97 m (6 ft 6 in)	29 – 2 June 1997
F	15	(Germany)	Müsse, Kai	2.00 m (6 ft 7 in)	20 – 4 July 2006
C	18	(Germany)	Gloger, Till	2.04 m (6 ft 8 in)	33 – 26 January 1993
PF	25	(Serbia)	Kovačević, Viktor	2.03 m (6 ft 8 in)	27 – 5 May 1999
G	51	(United States)	Peterson, Tyler	1.93 m (6 ft 4 in)	28 – 27 November 1997

Head coach

- (Serbia) Branislav Ignjatovic

Assistant coach(es)

- (Serbia) Nikola Stanic

Legend

- (C) Team captain
- Injured

- Roster
Updated: November 15, 2026

=== Individual awards ===
Basketball Bundesliga MVP
- Chuck Eidson – 2005

Basketball Bundesliga Best Offensive Player

- Chuck Eidson – 2005

Basketball Bundesliga Coach of the Year

- Stefan Koch – 2005

Basketball Bundesliga Rookie of the Year

- Anton Gavel – 2006

=== Notable players ===
To appear in this section a player must have either:

- Set a club record or won an individual award as a professional player.
- Played at least one official international match for his senior national team or one NBA game at any time.
- Achieved significant notability outside of basketball.
- (Germany) Henning Harnisch (3 seasons: 1985–88)
- (Germany) Heiko Schaffartzik (2 seasons: 2004–05, 2007–08)
- (Germany) (Kosovo) Besnik Bekteshi (1 season: 2014–15)
- (Slovakia) Anton Gavel (2 seasons: 2004–2006)
- (South Sudan) (United States) Nuni Omot
- (United States) Lance Blanks (1 season: 1994–1995)
- (United States) Louis Campbell (2 seasons: 2004–2006)
- (United States) Chuck Eidson (2 seasons: 2004–2006)
- (United States) Kevin Nash (1 season: 1980–1981)
- (United States) Diante Garrett (1 season: 2021)
- (United States) Rawle Alkins
- (United States) Nick Hornsby (born 1995)

=== Top scorers ===
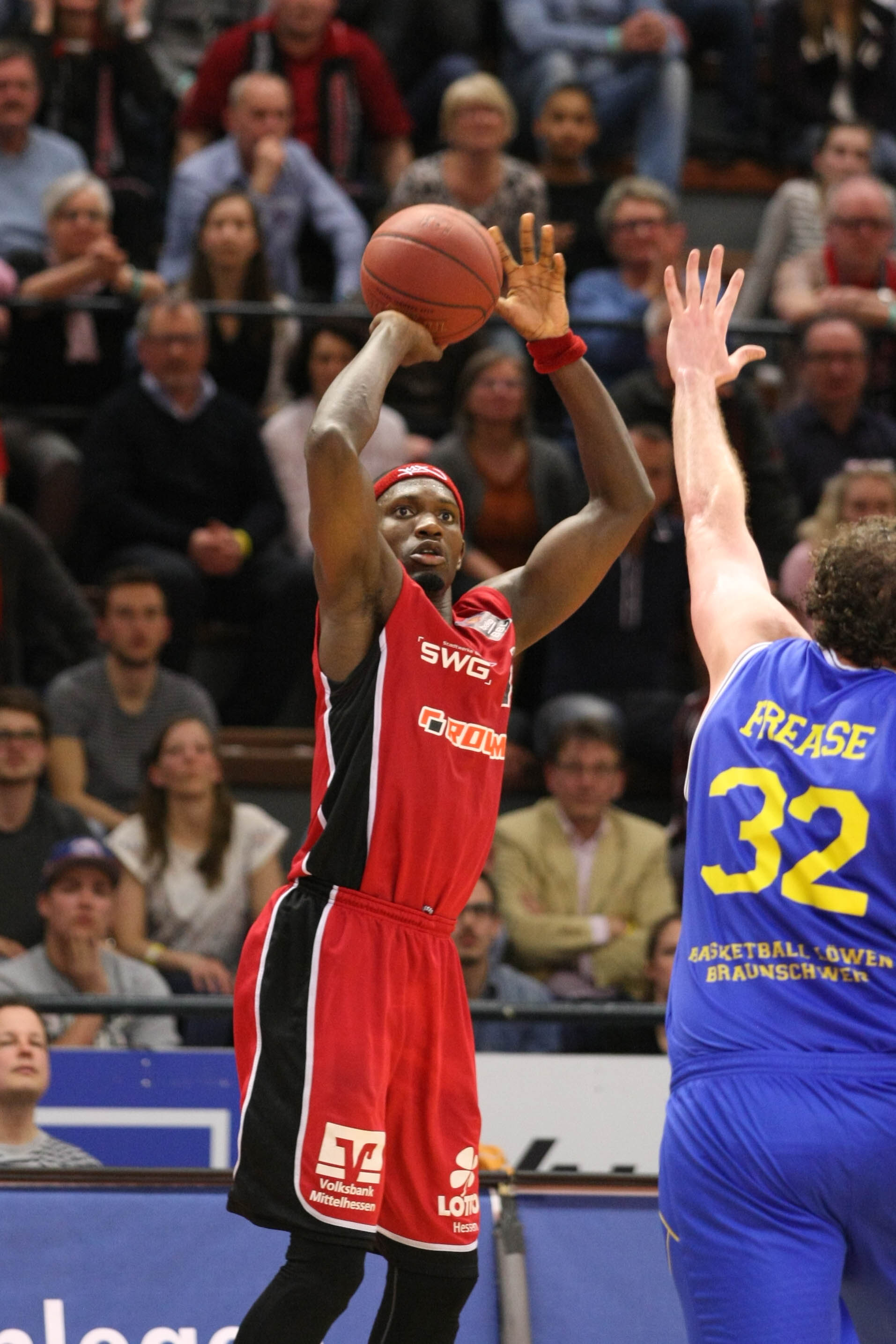
Suleiman Braimoh

Season	Player	PPG
2012–13	(United States) Ryan Brooks	15.9
2013–14	(United Kingdom) Myles Hesson	16.1
2014–15	(United States) Cameron Wells	12.3
2015–16	(Nigeria) Suleiman Braimoh	12.1
2016–17	(United States) Cameron Wells	14
