= Nürnberg Falcons BC =

Nürnberg Falcons
- Nickname: NBC; Die Falken
- Leagues: ProA
- Founded: 2009; 17 years ago
- History: List: Nürnberger BC (2009–2016) Nürnberg Falcons BC (2016–present)
- Arena: Kia Metropol Arena
- Capacity: 3,881
- Location: Nuremberg, Germany
- Team colors: Red, White, Black
- Head coach: Ralph Junge
- Team captain: Tim Köpple
- Website: www.nuernberg-falcons.de
Home	Away

Nürnberg Falcons BC, formerly called Nürnberger BC (abbreviated as NBC) is a basketball club based in Nuremberg, Germany. The team currently plays in the ProA, the German professional second division. In 2010–11 Nürnberg was promoted from the ProB to the ProA. In 2019, Nürnberg finished as runner-ups in the ProA. The club has been playing their home games in the newly built Kia Metropol arena, which has a capacity of 4,000 people, since 2021.

== History ==
The "Franken Hexer" was founded in 2002 as a "joint project of several Middle Franconian clubs to promote young basketball talents". The newly founded club started with a men's team in the lowest league (district class) as well as a male U16 and U18 team. The men's teams were also explicitly intended for young players.

In 2016, the name was changed to Falcons.

In the 2018–19 ProA season, Nürnberg ended in third place in the standings. In the playoffs it defeated second-seeded Heidelberg to qualify for the ProA finals. Because of this achievement, the team earned promotion to the Basketball Bundesliga (BBL) for the first time. In May 2019, it was announced that Falcons did not obtain a license for the BBL due to not meeting requirements on minimum arena size and minimum budget.

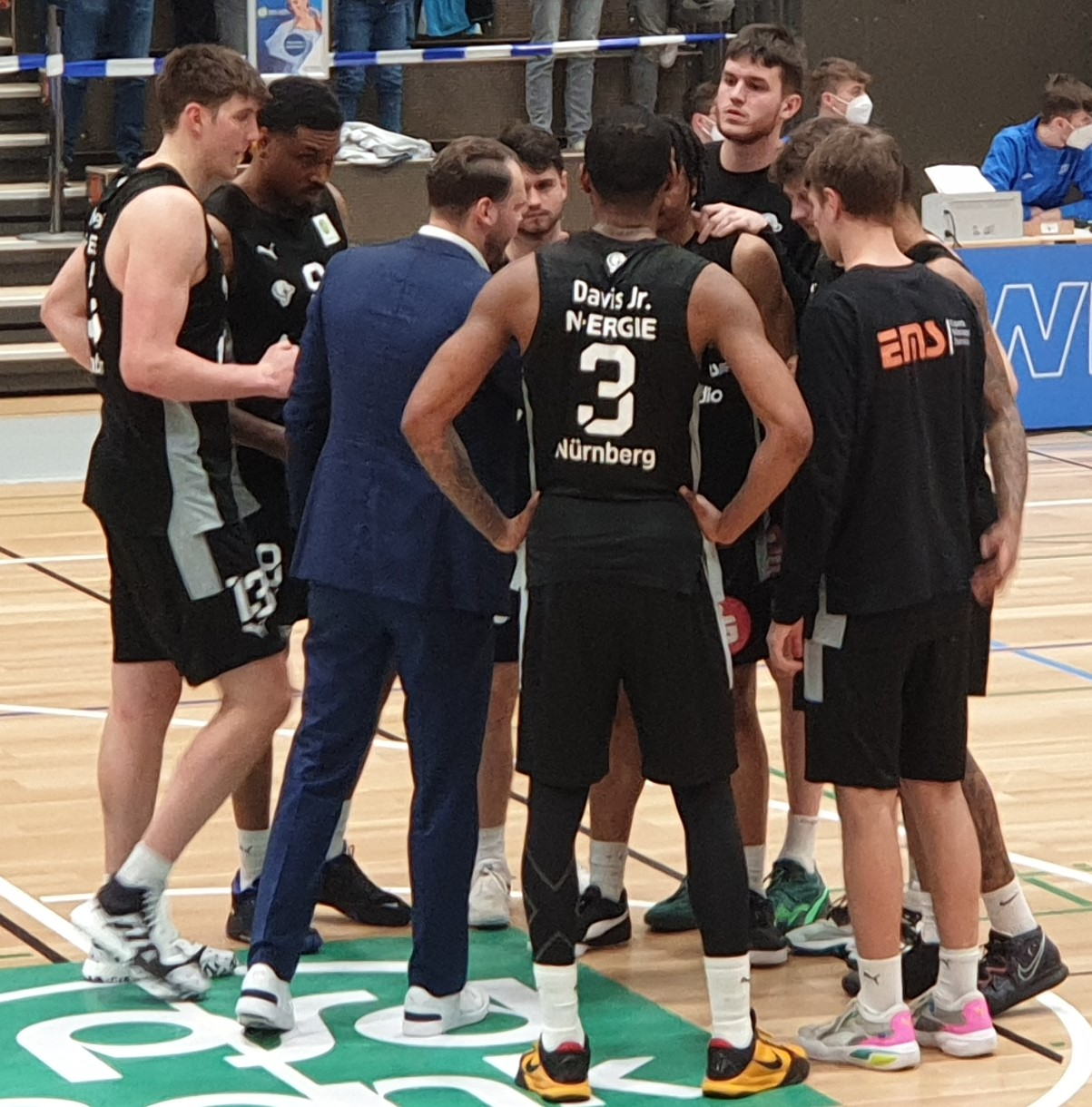
Nürnberg Falcons huddle in March 2022

Former logo, when the club was named rent4office Nürnberger BC

== Honours ==
- ProA
  - Runners-up (1): 2018–19

== Season by season ==
Season	Tier	League	Pos.	German Cup	European competitions
2024–25	2	ProA	13th		
2025–26	2	ProA	9th		

== Players ==
=== Current squad ===
Note: Flags indicate national team eligibility at FIBA-sanctioned events. Players may hold other non-FIBA nationalities not displayed.

Nürnberg Falcons BC roster
Players
Coaches

Pos.	No.	Nat.	Name	Ht.	Age
PG	0	(United States)	Austin Jr, Larry	1.88 m (6 ft 2 in)	30 – 18 February 1996
PG	4	(United States)	Bell, Xavier	1.90 m (6 ft 3 in)	24 – 4 April 2002
PG	5	(Germany)	Köpple, Tim (C)	1.84 m (6 ft 0 in)	26 – 3 September 2000
SG	7	(Germany)	Feneberg, Christian	1.94 m (6 ft 4 in)	24 – 22 April 2002
SG	9	(Germany)	von Waaden, Dominick	1.95 m (6 ft 5 in)	27 – 8 September 1999
PF	10	(United States)	Allred, Ty	2.06 m (6 ft 9 in)	24 – 5 July 2002
SF	11	(Germany)	Lenke, Lars	1.99 m (6 ft 6 in)	18 – 8 May 2008
C	13	(Germany)	Helterhoff, Daniel	2.08 m (6 ft 10 in)	23 – 14 February 2003
PF	20	(Germany)	Welp, Nic	2.04 m (6 ft 8 in)	24 – 20 March 2002
SG	33	(United States)	Heise, Nate	1.96 m (6 ft 5 in)	24 – 11 April 2002
F/C	42	(United States)	Stower, Drew	2.03 m (6 ft 8 in)	23 – 27 February 2003
C	44	(Germany)	Lagerpusch, Lars	2.07 m (6 ft 9 in)	28 – 28 March 1998

Head coach

(United States) Tim Black

Assistant coach(es)

(Germany) Derrick Taylor

Legend

- (C) Team captain
- Injured

- Roster
Updated: November 16, 2026

=== Individual awards ===
ProA MVP

- Braydon Hobbs: 2015

=== Notable players ===
- Set a club record or won an individual award as a professional player.
- Played at least one official international match for his senior national team at any time.

- (Germany) Bastian Doreth
- (Germany) Tim Ohlbrecht
- (Uganda) (United States) Ish Wainright
- (United States) A. J. Davis
- (United States) Braydon Hobbs
- (United States) Dan Oppland
- (United States) Eric Washington
- (United States) Diante Watkins

== Head coaches ==
- (Lithuania) Vytautas Buzas: (2019–2020, 2021–2022)
- (United States) (Germany) Derrick Taylor: (2022–2023)
- (United States) Virgil Matthews: (2023–2024)
- (Germany) Ralph Junge: (2024–2026)
- (United States) Tim Black: (2026–present)

== See also ==
- Falke Nürnberg
