= Phoenix Hagen =

- Nickname: Die Feuervögel (The Firebirds)
- Leagues: BBL
- Founded: 2004
- Arena: Krollmann Arena
- Capacity: 3,145
- Location: Hagen, Germany
- Team colors: Yellow, white, blue
- President: Martin Schmidt
- Head coach: Chris Harris
- Team captain: Dennis Nawrocki
- Championships: ProA 1 (2026)
- Website: www.phoenix-hagen.de
Home	Away

Phoenix Hagen is a professional basketball club based in Hagen, Germany. After withdrawing from the Basketball Bundesliga (BBL) in November 2016, Phoenix Hagen re-launched its basketball team for the 2017-18 ProA season, Germany's second division of professional basketball. After winning the championship in the 2. Basketball Bundesliga ProA, the club got promoted to the Basketball Bundesliga again in 2026.

== History ==
=== Footsteps of a former champion ===
Phoenix Hagen was founded in May 2004 in the wake of the insolvency of former top club Brandt Hagen. Brandt Hagen was forced to cease club operation in the Basketball Bundesliga (BBL) immediately in December 2003. Phoenix Hagen is not the legal successor of Brandt Hagen, but an independent new club founded to continue the basketball tradition in Hagen. Phoenix Hagen was playing in the PRO A division of the German second basketball league until the 2008–09 season. The club rented the license for operating in this league from BG DEK/Fichte Hagen, and thus is that club's legal successor. In the 2008–09 season of the Pro A Phoenix Hagen secured the second place. This position qualified the team for promotion to BBL in the season 2009–10.

Starting with season 2008–09 a Phoenix Hagen women's team is playing in the second women's league DBBL. This team is run in collaboration with the sports club TSV Hagen 1860, from which all players originate.

Phoenix Hagen wants to promote young basketball talents to ensure high-performance sport for the long term. The young talents team Phoenix Hagen Juniors plays in the north-west division of the first league for Germany's up-and-coming players (NBBL). In the first season of existence of the NBBL (2007–08), the Phoenix juniors team became vice champions.

The club filed for insolvency in October 2016 due to financial difficulties and had its Bundesliga license revoked with immediate effect the following month. The club did not finish the 2016–17 season and was placed back to the ProA for the following season.

=== Licence and arena issue ===
The home arena "Ischelandhalle" has a capacity of 1,800. The minimum capacity requirement for the BBL is 3,000. A refurbishment and enlargement to a capacity of 3,000 of the current building is planned for the 2009–10 season. Therefore, an alternative location is required for that period. Three options were considered by Phoenix Hagen: a tent solution in Hagen with a capacity of 3,500, an alternative gym in Hagen or a location near Hagen. On 23 April 2009 the BBL refused the application of Phoenix Hagen for a license to play in the BBL. In the application the tent solution was proposed, which has been the reason for the rejection. Within a week after the rejection Phoenix Hagen had the right to appeal against the decision. Phoenix Hagen evaluated the feasibility of converting a building, which is located in Hagen and is currently hosting badminton and tennis courts. As an alternative solution outside of Hagen, the gym "Uni Sporthalle" of the University of Wuppertal was considered. The appeal to the BBL was staged with the plans and contracts for the Hagen solution. On Tuesday 02/05/09 the responsible board of the BBL decided to send a delegation to the proposed location in Hagen to inspect the site before making a final decision on the licence. On Friday 08/05/09 the BBL canceled their previous decision and granted a licence with resolutive condition. Phoenix Hagen is eligible to maintain the licence, if progress requirements for the setup of the basketball arena will be fulfilled. The temporary arena is planned to have a capacity of 3,035. On Monday 06/07/09 the BBL announced that Phoenix Hagen has fulfilled the requirements regarding its economic performance. Phoenix Hagen will have to present the arena converted and ready for match operation by 31 July 2009, which forms the final hurdle towards the 2009–10 BBL licence. In the 08/05/09 press release the BBL already stated that it expects Phoenix Hagen also to meet these requirements.

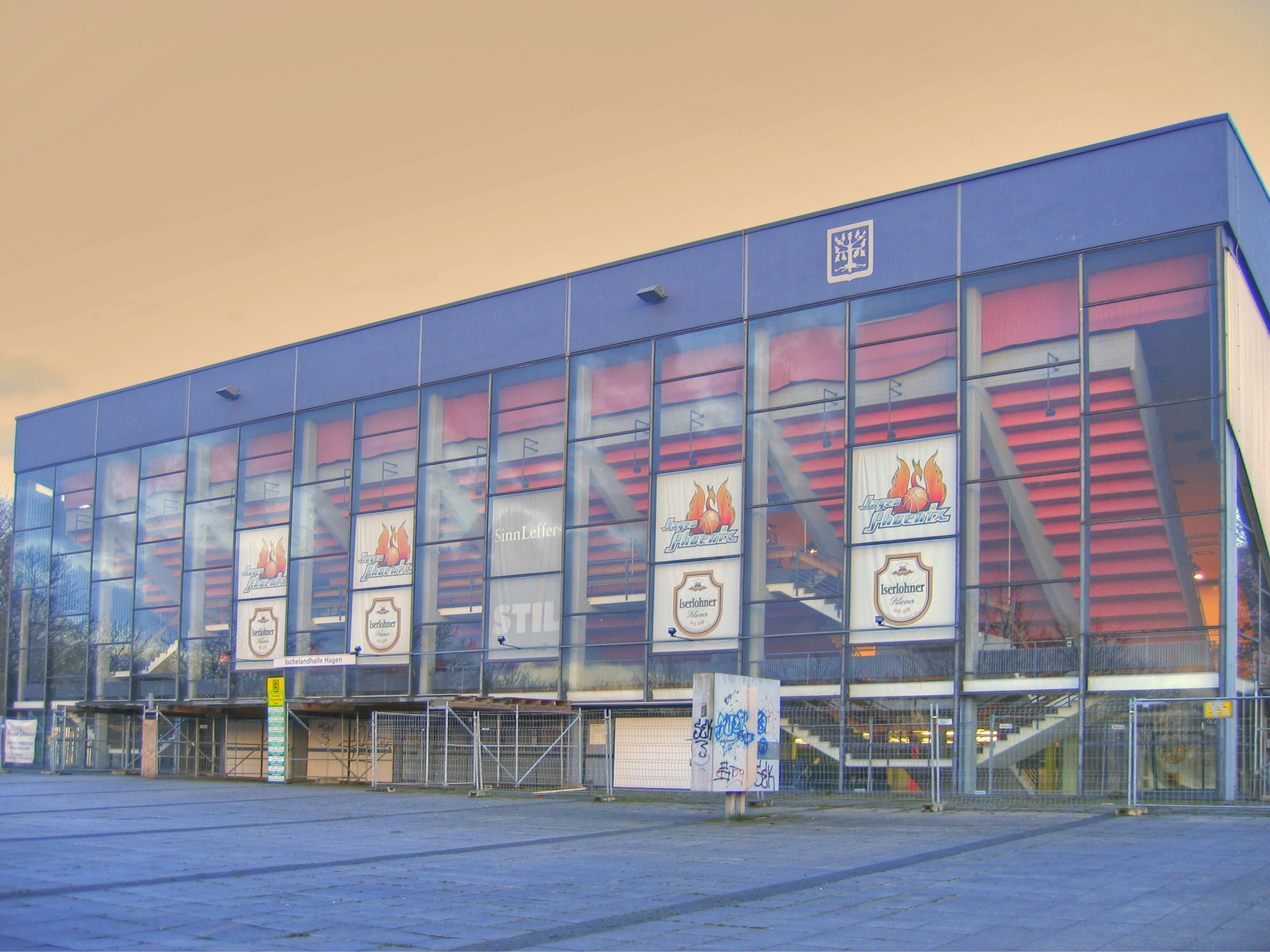
The Ischelandhalle, the venue of Phoenix Hagen's home matches

In November 2016, the club had its Bundesliga license revoked.

Beginning in the 2017–18 season, Phoenix Hagen re-launched its basketball team in the ProA, Germany's second division of professional basketball.

=== Establishment as one of the ProA's main competitors ===
After the 2022-23 Playoff season, Guard Kyle Castlin left Hagen for Belfius Mons-Hainaut.

For the 2023–24 season, Hagen was especially well equipped for its frontcourt positions as they already had players Tim Uhlemann and Marvin Omuvwie, but were reinforced by Lennart Boner (came from Giants Düsseldorf) and Nazihar Bohannon (formerly Clemson Tigers), whereas Chris Harris continued to be the Head coach.

The team reached the Final Four where they ceded to eventual league champion Karlsruhe Lions 1-3 victories.

In 2026, the team was promoted and returned to the Basketball Bundesliga in 9 years after they beat VfL Kirchheim Knights 175–168 on aggregate in the finals of the ProA.

== Players ==
=== Current roster ===
Note: Flags indicate national team eligibility at FIBA-sanctioned events. Players may hold other non-FIBA nationalities not displayed.

Phoenix Hagen roster
Players
Coaches

Pos.	No.	Nat.	Name	Ht.	Wt.	Age
PG	0	(United States)	Graves, Marcus	1.85 m (6 ft 1 in)	85 kg (187 lb)	30 – 9 June 1996
SG	2	(United States)	Anderson, C. J.	1.97 m (6 ft 6 in)	93 kg (205 lb)	30 – 10 May 1996
G	3	(United States)	Kunkel, Adam	1.93 m (6 ft 4 in)	90 kg (198 lb)	26 – 9 December 1999
PG	4	(Germany)	Kraushaar, Bjarne	1.90 m (6 ft 3 in)	81 kg (179 lb)	27 – 12 June 1999
PG	6	(Germany)	Ohrmann, Luis	1.86 m (6 ft 1 in)	80 kg (176 lb)	18 – 14 April 2008
SF	7	(Germany)	Drescher, Finn	1.90 m (6 ft 3 in)	80 kg (176 lb)	19 – 17 April 2007
G/F	8	(Switzerland)	Polite, Anthony	1.98 m (6 ft 6 in)	97 kg (214 lb)	29 – 21 June 1997
PF	10	(Germany)	Bleck, Fabian	2.01 m (6 ft 7 in)	105 kg (231 lb)	33 – 19 March 1993
SF	11	(Germany)	Omuvwie, Marvin	1.95 m (6 ft 5 in)	95 kg (209 lb)	29 – 11 July 1997
PF	12	(United States)	Polley, Tyler	2.06 m (6 ft 9 in)	97 kg (214 lb)	27 – 7 April 1999
PF	21	(Germany)	Uhlemann, Tim	2.03 m (6 ft 8 in)	105 kg (231 lb)	27 – 9 April 1999
SF	24	(Germany)	Schultze, Nicola	1.97 m (6 ft 6 in)	87 kg (192 lb)	19 – 1 November 2006
C	25	(United States)	Krutwig, Cameron	2.06 m (6 ft 9 in)	116 kg (256 lb)	27 – 21 December 1998
SF	29	(Argentina)	Garino, Patricio	2.01 m (6 ft 7 in)	98 kg (216 lb)	33 – 17 May 1993
G	33	(United States)	Gibson, Trenton	1.93 m (6 ft 4 in)	95 kg (209 lb)	26 – 19 April 2000
PG	44	(Slovenia)	Razdevsek, Jan	1.91 m (6 ft 3 in)	90 kg (198 lb)	25 – 16 December 2000

Head coach

- (Canada) Chris Harris

Assistant coach(es)

- (Germany) Johannes Hülsmann
- (Lithuania) Andrius Mikutis
- (Germany) Demetrius Ward

Legend

- (C) Team captain
- Injured

- Roster
Updated: 1 October 2026

== Notable former players ==
- Set a club record or won an individual award as a professional player.
- Played at least one official international match for his senior national team at any time.

- (Germany) Per Günther
- (Canada) Owen Klassen*
- (Democratic Republic of the Congo) Yannick Anzuluni
- (Belgium) Thomas Dreesen
- (Ivory Coast) Jonathan Kale
- (Czech Republic) Adam Pechacek
- (Finland) Luukas Vaara
- (Lithuania) Zygimantas Jonusas*
- (Senegal) Mohamed Niang
- (Tunisia) Ziyed Chennoufi
- (United States) David Bell*
- (United States) Todd Brown
- (United States) Kyle Castlin
- (United States) Jason Crowe
- (United States) Larry Gordon
- (United States) Adam Hess
- (United States) Michael-Hakim Jordan
- (United States) J.J. Mann
- (United States) Marquise Moore
- (United States) Trent Plaisted
- (United States) Quentin Pryor
- (United States) John Turek
- (United States) Davin White*
- (United States) Richard Williams

-*elected as Phoenix Hagen's "Team of the Century" by the German Newspaper WAZ in January 2020.

== Head coaches ==
- (Germany) Ingo Freyer (2007–2016)
- (Germany) Matthias-Grothe (2017–2018)
- (Canada) Chris Harris (2018–present)

== Season by season ==
Season	Tier	League	Pos.	Cup
2004–05	2	2. Bundesliga	11th	
2005–06	2	2. Bundesliga	4th	
2006–07	2	2. Bundesliga	9th	
2007–08	2	ProA	6th	
2008–09	2	ProA	2nd	
2009–10	1	Bundesliga	16th	
2010–11	1	Bundesliga	11th	
2011–12	1	Bundesliga	15th	
2012–13	1	Bundesliga	8th	
2013–14	1	Bundesliga	10th	
2014–15	1	Bundesliga	13th	
2015–16	1	Bundesliga	13th	
2016–17	1	Bundesliga	18th	
2017–18	2	ProA	8th	
2018–19	2	ProA	10th	
2019–20	2	ProA	10th	
2020–21	2	ProA	12th	
2021–22	2	ProA	10th	
2022–23	2	ProA	8th	
2023–24	2	ProA	12th	
2024–25	2	ProA	4th	First round
2025–26	2	ProA	Champion	First round
2026–27	1	Bundesliga		

== Kit ==
=== Manufacturer ===
2015: Owayo

=== Sponsor ===
2014–2016: Märkische Bank
