= Race Thompson =

American basketball player (born 1999)

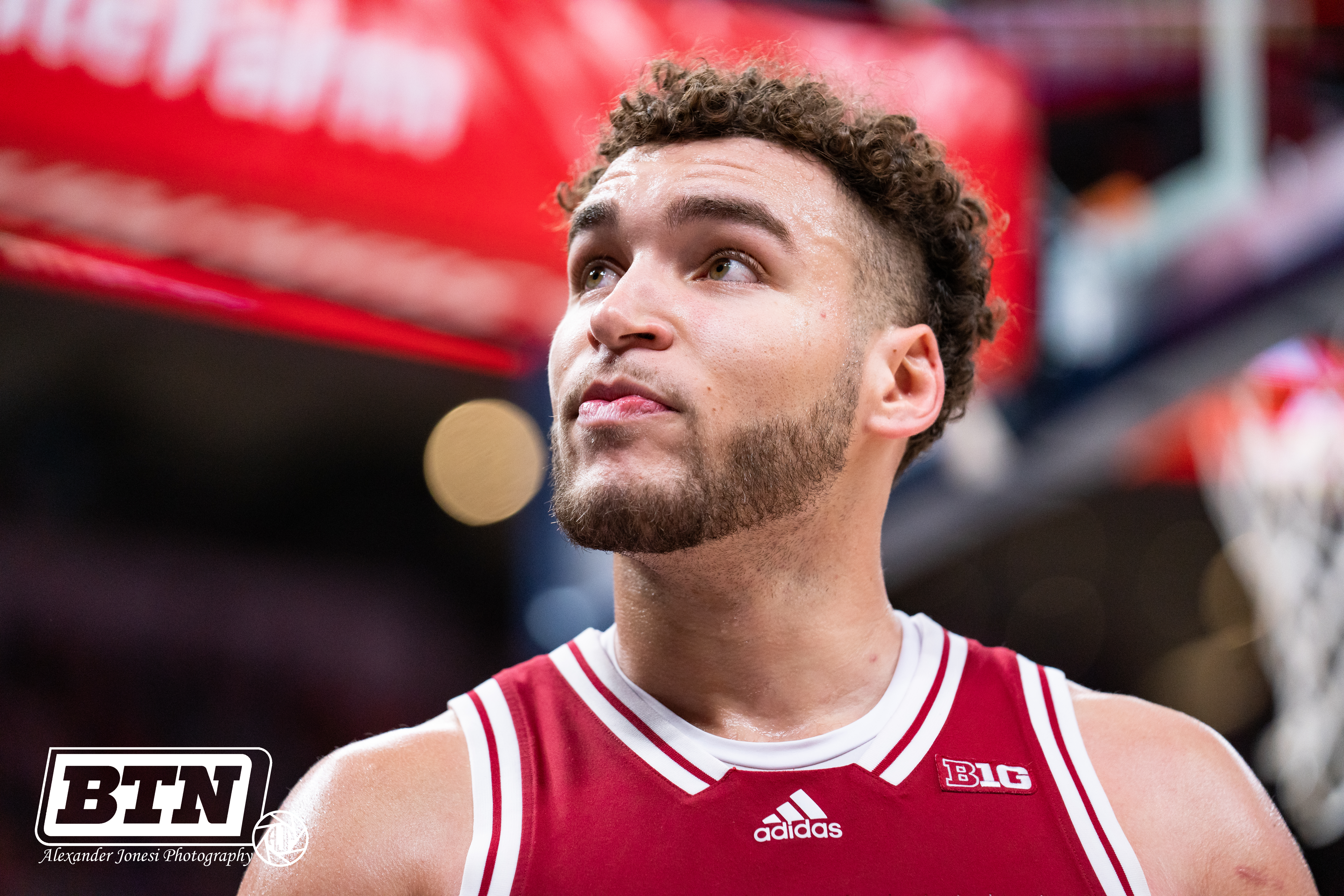

No. 5 – Fraport Skyliners
- Position: Forward
- League: Basketball Bundesliga; EuroCup

Personal information
- Born: June 4, 1999 (age 27) Plymouth, Minnesota, U.S.
- Listed height: 6 ft 8 in (2.03 m)
- Listed weight: 235 lb (107 kg)

Career information
- High school: Robbinsdale Armstrong (Plymouth, Minnesota)
- College: Indiana (2017–2023)
- NBA draft: 2023: undrafted
- Playing career: 2023–present

Career history
- 2023–2024: Memphis Hustle
- 2025–2026: Legia Warsaw
- 2026–present: Fraport Skyliners

Career highlights
- PLK champion (2026); All-Big Ten Honorable Mention (2022)

Race Thompson (born June 4, 1999) is an American professional basketball player for Skyliners Frankfurt of the Basketball Bundesliga (BBL) and the EuroCup. He played college basketball for the Indiana.

== Professional career ==
After graduation from Indiana, Thompson went undrafted. On October 16, 2024 he signed for the Memphis Hustle in the NBA G League.

On July 14, 2025, Thompson signed for Legia Warsaw in Poland.

On July 10, 2026, he signed with Skyliners Frankfurt of the Basketball Bundesliga (BBL).
