= Sporthalle Gießen-Ost =

Indoor sporting arena in Gießen, Germany

Coordinates: 50°34′39″N 8°41′29″E

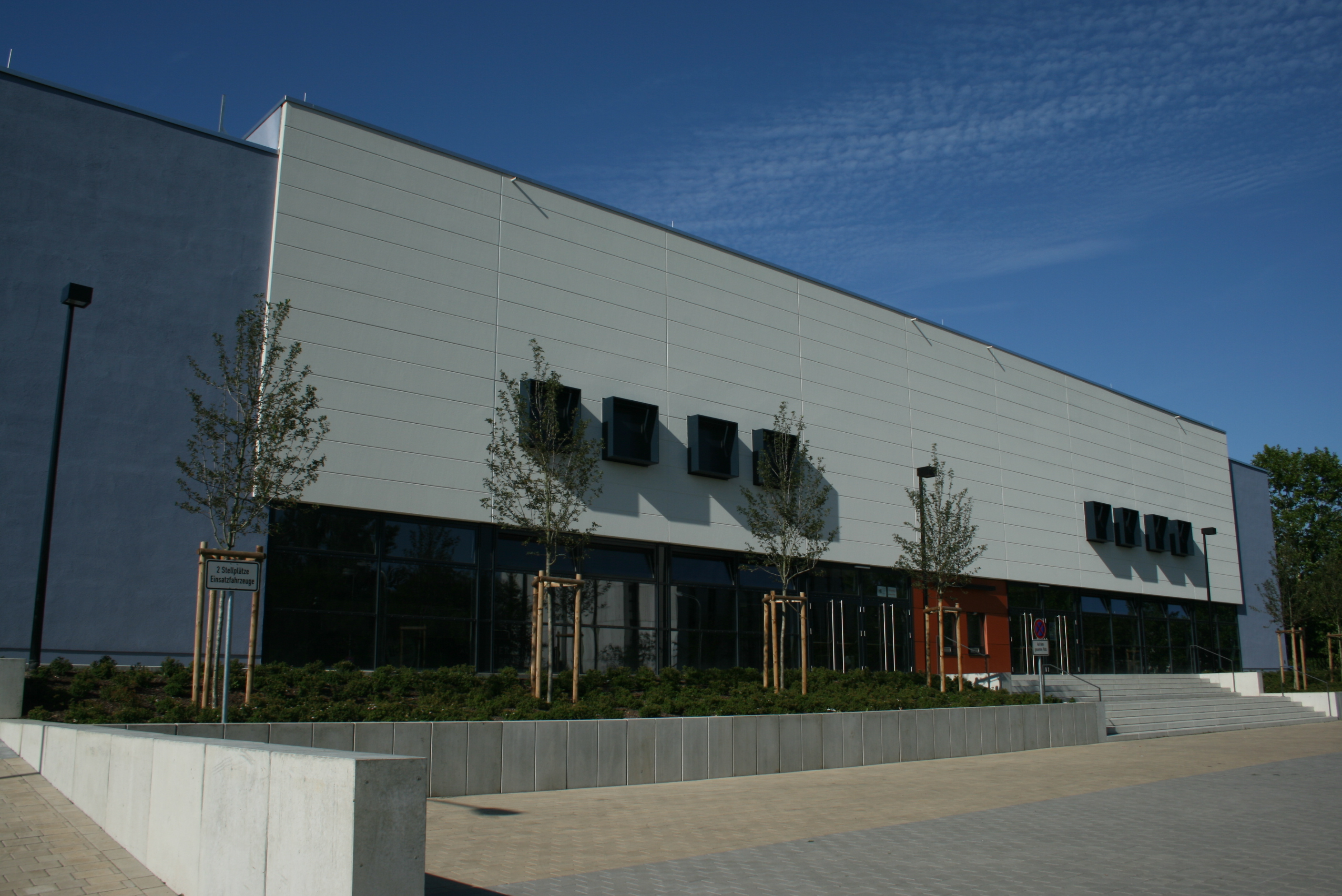
Sporthalle Gießen-Ost, 2007

Sporthalle Gießen-Ost is an indoor sporting arena located in Gießen, Germany. The gym was built in the 1960s both as the gym of a nearby high school as well as the gym for the city's professional basketball team, the Giessen 46ers. In 2006, the arena was renovated and holds now a capacity of 4,003 people.
