= ProA =

Second-tier basketball league in Germany

- Formerly: 2. Basketball Bundesliga
- Founded: 2007; 19 years ago
- First season: 2007–08
- Country: Germany
- Confederation: FIBA Europe
- Number of teams: 18
- Level on pyramid: 2
- Promotion to: Basketball Bundesliga
- Relegation to: ProB
- Current champions: Phoenix Hagen (1st title) (2025–26)
- Most championships: Mitteldeutscher BC; Rasta Vechta (3 titles)
- Website: www.2basketballbundesliga.de

The ProA is the second-tier league of professional club basketball in Germany. The league comprises 16 teams. Officially the ProA is part of the 2. Basketball Bundesliga, which consists of the two hierarchical leagues ProA and ProB. Before the 2007–08 season, the 2. Basketball Bundesliga was a basketball league with the same name, which consisted of two geographical divisions. At the end of the league stage, the top two teams qualify for the Basketball Bundesliga, and the teams positioned 15th and 16th are relegated to the lower league, ProB.

== Current teams (2026–27) ==
Clubs of the ProA 2026/27

Team	City
Artland Dragons	Quakenbrück
BG Göttingen	Göttingen
Eisbären Bremerhaven	Bremerhaven
EPG Baskets Koblenz	Koblenz
ETB Miners	Essen
Giessen 46ers	Giessen
HAKRO Merlins Crailsheim	Crailsheim
Kreisbau Kirchheim Knights	Kirchheim unter Teck
MLP Academics Heidelberg	Heidelberg
MpK Bayreuth	Bayreuth
Nürnberg Falcons	Nuremberg
OrangeAcademy	Neu-Ulm
Paderborn Baskets	Paderborn
PS Karlsruhe LIONS	Karlsruhe
RheinStars Köln	Köln
SBB Börde Baskets	Wolmirstedt
Tigers Tübingen	Tübingen
VfL SparkassenStars Bochum	Bochum

== Champions ==
The champions of a given ProA season promote to the Basketball Bundesliga, along with the runner-up of the Finals.

Season	Champion	Runner-up
2007–08	Giants Nördlingen	Cuxhaven BasCats
2008–09	Mitteldeutscher BC	Phoenix Hagen
2009–10	Bayreuth	Cuxhaven BasCats
2010–11	Bayern Munich	Würzburg Baskets
2011–12	Mitteldeutscher BC	VfL Kirchheim Knights
2012–13	Rasta Vechta	Giants Düsseldorf
2013–14	Göttingen	Crailsheim Merlins
2014–15	Gießen 46ers	s.Oliver Würzburg
2015–16	Science City Jena	Rasta Vechta
2016–17	Mitteldeutscher BC	Oettinger Rockets
2017–18	Rasta Vechta	Crailsheim Merlins
2018–19	Hamburg Towers	Nürnberg Falcons
2019–20	Abandoned due to COVID-19 pandemic	
2020–21	Heidelberg	Bayer Giants Leverkusen
2021–22	Rostock Seawolves	Tigers Tübingen
2022–23	Rasta Vechta	Tigers Tübingen
2023–24	PS Karlsruhe LIONS	Skyliners Frankfurt
2024–25	VET Concept Gladiators Trier	Science City Jena
2025–26	Phoenix Hagen	Bozic Estriche Knights Kirchheim

=== Performances by club ===
Club	Winners	Runners-up	Years won	Years runner-up
Mitteldeutscher BC	3	0	2009, 2012, 2017	–
Rasta Vechta	3	1	2013, 2018, 2023	2016
Science City Jena	1	1	2016	2025
Giants Nördlingen	1	0	2008	–
BBC Bayreuth	1	0	2010	–
Bayern Munich	1	0	2011	–
Göttingen	1	0	2014	–
Gießen 46ers	1	0	2015	–
Hamburg Towers	1	0	2019	–
Heidelberg	1	0	2021	–
Rostock Seawolves	1	0	2022	–
PS Karlsruhe LIONS	1	0	2024	–
VET Concept Gladiators Trier	1	0	2025	–
Phoenix Hagen	1	0	2026	–
Cuxhaven BasCats	0	2	–	2008, 2010
Würzburg Baskets	0	2	–	2011, 2015
Crailsheim Merlins	0	2	–	2014, 2018
Tigers Tübingen	0	2	–	2022, 2023
VfL Kirchheim Knights	0	2	–	2012, 2026
Giants Düsseldorf	0	1	–	2013
Oettinger Rockets	0	1	–	2017
Nürnberg Falcons	0	1	–	2019
Bayer Giants Leverkusen	0	1	–	2021
Skyliners Frankfurt	0	1	–	2024

== Awards ==
=== Player of the Year ===
Year	Player	Team	Ref.
2007–08	(United States) Roderick Trice	Cuxhaven BasCats	
2008–09	(United States) Wayne Bernard	Mitteldeutscher BC	
2009–10	(United States) Jaivon Harris	BBC Bayreuth	
2010–11	(Australia) Lee Jeka	Würzburg Baskets	
2011–12	(United States) Arizona Reid	Mitteldeutscher BC (2)	
2012–13	(United States) Richard Williams	SC Rasta Vechta	
2013–14	(United States) Harper Kamp	BG Göttingen	
2014–15	(United States) Braydon Hobbs	Nürnberger BC	
2015–16	(Germany) Christian Standhardinger	SC Rasta Vechta	
2016–17	(Germany) Leon Kratzer	Baunach Young Pikes	
2017–18	(United States) Seth Hinrichs	Rasta Vechta	
2018–19	(Germany) Malte Ziegenhagen	Chemnitz 99	
2019–20	(United States) Kendale McCullum	Uni Paderborn Baskets	
2020–21	(Germany) Haris Hujic	Bayer Giants Leverkusen	
2023–24	(United States) Michael Flowers	Bozic Knights	
2024–25	(United States) Keith Braxton	AstroStars Bochum	
2025–26	(United States) Ben Burnham	Artland Dragons	

=== Young Player of the Year ===
Year	Player	Team	Ref.
2007–08	(Germany) Per Günther	Phoenix Hagen	
2008–09	(Germany) Johannes Lischka	LTi Lich	
2009–10	(Germany) Simon Schmitz	Science City Jena	
2010–11	(Germany) Bastian Doreth	Bayern Munich	
2011–12	(Germany) Jusuf El-Domiaty	Cuxhaven BasCats	
2012–13	(Germany) Akeem Vargas	BG Göttingen	
2013–14	(Germany) Stephan Haukohl	erdgas Ehingen/Urspr.schule	
2014–15	(Germany) Besnik Bekteshi	Gießen 46ers	
2015–16	(Germany) Johannes Thiemann	Baunach Young Pikes	
2016–17	(Germany) Jonas Richter	Niners Chemnitz	
2017–18	(Australia) William McDowell-White	Baunach Young Pikes	
2018–19	(Germany) Justus Hollatz	Hamburg Towers	
2019–20	(Germany) Moritz Sanders	Nürnberg Falcons BC	
2024–25	(Germany) Alexander Richardson	Düsseldorf Baskets	

=== Coach of the Year ===
Year	Coach	Team	Ref.
2007–08	(Germany) Andreas Wagner	Giants Nördlingen	
2008–09	(Germany) Björn Harmsen	Mitteldeutscher BC	
2009–10	(Germany) Andreas Wagner (2)	BBC Bayreuth	
2010–11	(Germany) Torsten Loibl	BV Chemnitz 99	
2011–12	(Croatia) Silvano Poropat	Mitteldeutscher BC (2)	
2011–12	(Germany) Felix Schreier	Chemnitz Niners	
2012–13	(United States) Patrick Elzie	SC Rasta Vechta	
2013–14	(Germany) Ralph Junge	erdgas Ehingen/Urspr.schule	
2014–15	(Germany) Denis Wucherer	Gießen 46ers	
2015–16	(Germany) Björn Harmsen (2)	Science City Jena	
2016–17	(Argentina) Rodrigo Pastore	Niners Chemnitz	
2017–18	(United States) Michael Mai	PS Karlsruhe Lions	
2018–19	(Germany) Ralph Junge (2)	Nürnberg Falcons BC	
2019–20	(Argentina) Rodrigo Pastore (2)	Niners Chemnitz	
2024–25	(Germany) Björn Harmsen (3)	Science City Jena	

== Records ==
Lachlan Dent holds the ProA league record for 3-pointers made in a single game. 7 April 2024, he hit 10 for his PS Karlsruhe Lions against Paderborn Baskets.

== See also ==
- 2. Basketball Bundesliga
- ProB
