= VfL Kirchheim Knights =

German basketball team

- Leagues: ProA
- Founded: 2006; 20 years ago
- History: VfL Kirchheim Knights (2006–present)
- Arena: Sporthalle Stadtmitte
- Capacity: 1,800
- Location: Kirchheim unter Teck, Germany
- Team colors: Yellow, Black
- Website: kirchheim-knights.de
Home	Away

VfL Kirchheim Knights, also known as Kreisbau Knights Kirchheim for sponsorship reasons, is a professional basketball club based in Kirchheim unter Teck, Germany. The team plays in the ProA, the second highest stage in Germany.

== Season by season ==
Season	Tier	League	Pos.	German Cup	European competitions
2007–08	3	ProB	Runner-up		
2008–09	2	ProA	5th		
2009–10	2	ProA	4th		
2010–11	2	ProA	4th		
2011–12	2	ProA	Runner-up		
2012–13	2	ProA	15th		
2013–14	2	ProA	10th		
2014–15	2	ProA	11th		
2015–16	2	ProA	5th		
2016–17	2	ProA	4th		
2017–18	2	ProA	9th		
2018–19	2	ProA	12th		
2019–20	2	ProA	11th		
2020–21	2	ProA	4th		
2021–22	2	ProA	11th		
2022–23	2	ProA	10th		
2023–24	2	ProA	7th		
2024–25	2	ProA	9th		
2025–26	2	ProA	6th		
2026–27	2	ProA		First round	

Source: Eurobasket

== Notable players ==
- Besnik Bekteshi
- Tidjan Keita
