= Ehingen Urspring =

- Leagues: ProB
- Founded: 2005; 21 years ago
- Arena: Johann Vanotti Gymnasium
- Capacity: 1,500
- Location: Ehingen, Germany
- Team colors: Lime, White, Black
- Team captain: Andre Nation
- 2018–19 position: ProA, 7th of 16
- Championships: 2 ProB
- Website: www.ehingen-urspring.de
Home	Away

Ehingen Urspring is a professional basketball club based in Ehingen, Germany. The team plays in the ProB, the third German division. Ehingen has won the ProB, Germany's third tier league, twice, in 2011 and 2016.

Home games of the team are played in the Johann Vanotti Gymnasium, which has capacity for 1,500 people.

== Honours ==
- ProB

Winners (2): 2010–11, 2015–16

== Players ==
=== Notable players ===
Note: Flags indicate national team eligibility at FIBA-sanctioned events. Players may hold other non-FIBA nationalities not displayed.

- (United States) Jon Godfread (2005–2006)
- (Australia) Timothy Lang (2010–2011)
- (Switzerland) Yanic Konan Niederhäuser (2021–2022)
- (Germany) Christian Standhardinger (2006–2009)
- (Germany) Akeem Vargas (2006–2012)
- (United States) Garrett Williamson (2012–2013)

== Season by season ==
Season	Tier	League	Pos.	Postseason
2011–12	2	ProA	11	–
2012–13	2	ProA	8	Quarterfinalist
2013–14	2	ProA	3	Quarterfinalist
