= Uni Baskets Münster =

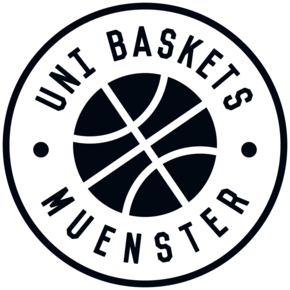
- Leagues: ProB; 2. DBBL
- Founded: 1961; 65 years ago
- History: UBC Münster (1961–2015); WWU Baskets Münster (2015–2023); Uni Baskets Münster (2023–present)
- Arena: Sporthalle Berg Fidel
- Capacity: 3,000
- Location: Münster, Germany
- President: Helge Stuckenholz
- Head coach: Götz Rohdewald
- Team captain: Cosmo Grühn
- Website: Official website
Home	Away

Uni Baskets Münster is a professional basketball club based in Münster, Germany. Since the 2026/27 season, the club competes in the third tier ProB league for their male team and in the second tier 2. DBBL for their female team.

== History ==
The club was founded in 1961 as UBC Münster. In 1978 they won the 2. Basketball Bundesliga and earned promotion to Bundesliga for the first time.

In June 2015, the team name changed to "WWU Baskets Münster."

Münster promoted to the ProA in 2022.

Münster was very young and had lots of players who played in the ProA for the first time. The fans supported their team much as Münster had the highest average attendance in the league (2,311 per game). Coach Björn Harmsen, whom the newspaper Westfalenpost once regarded as a "tactical genius", was yet also known for being very tough on his players. While Münster struggled with injuries, their rivals for relegation were Giants Düsseldorf and Bayer Giants Leverkusen.

Münster finished the 2022-23 ProA season as 14th out of 18, thus avoiding relegation.

Jordan Jones' year in Münster was less conspicuous than everyone involved had hoped in advance. Jordan slipped into the second tier after the late signing of former international Andreas Seiferth, but was still an important factor in the successful fight to stay in the league with an average of 5.3 points and playing time in all 34 games of the season. Eventually, the Poughkeepsie, New York native moved to Austria.

Yet, for the 2023/24 season, Stefan Weß and Adam Touray extended their contracts. Both players had known each other since they played for Münster as teenagers. Both returned to Münster after trips to other clubs and after being pillars of the second division team WWU Baskets. As teenagers, both players’ talent did not go unnoticed when they played in Münster's regional league team under head coach Götz Rohdewald, who in June 2023 became head coach of the club's first team.

Weß, who played for the NINERS Chemnitz in the past has been a A2-national team player who narrowly missed the Bundesliga promotion with the Niners Chemnitz in 2017. His buddy Touray also knocked on the door of the top flight; after further stints with ETB Essen and Schalke 04, he was briefly under contract with Bundesliga club Ludwigsburg in 2020. Weß and Touray are expected to be mainstays in Rohdewald's playing philosophy, which calls for a fast, aggressive style. Rohdewald stated "I've known Wessi since he was 16. As a player, his shot is his great strength, along with his size. The opponent always has to be close to him, and that opens up spaces for his teammates." About Touray he said "Adam is incredibly fast and has a lot of jumping power. We want to use that offensively, especially in the pick-and-roll. I think he also has potential as a shooter." And further stressed his rebounding skills.

In 2023, the University of Münster parted ways with its namesake Wilhelm II, following a senate decision. The decision was preceded by a process lasting several years.

For the basketball team, there were no real alternatives to the new name, and the close ties and partnership with the university were to continue. "The term Baskets has become firmly established in the minds of Münster and the surrounding area at the latest with the euphoria after our promotion to Pro B in 2018. We therefore want to hold on to this bridge to our sport," explained manager Helge Stuckenholz.

In June 2023, the team name changed to "Uni Baskets Münster".

== Home arena ==
Münster plays its home games at Berg Fidel of 3000 capacity.

== Players ==
=== Current roster ===
Note: Flags indicate national team eligibility at FIBA-sanctioned events. Players may hold other non-FIBA nationalities not displayed.

Uni Baskets Münster roster
Players
Coaches

Pos.	No.	Nat.	Name
SF	0	(United States)	O'Brien, Andrew	2.00 m (6 ft 7 in)	97 kg (214 lb)	24 – 9 July 2001
SG	1	(United States)	Hodges, Bo	1.95 m (6 ft 5 in)	98 kg (216 lb)	27 – 27 July 1998
SF	2	(Germany)	Ridder, Jannis	1.97 m (6 ft 6 in)	95 kg (209 lb)	20 – 27 July 2005
SG	3	(Germany)	Viefhues, Paul	1.93 m (6 ft 4 in)	77 kg (170 lb)	21 – 18 February 2005
SG	4	(United States)	McMullen, Nick	2.03 m (6 ft 8 in)	106 kg (234 lb)	24 – 13 May 2002
PG	6	(Germany)	Dilschmann, Thore	1.88 m (6 ft 2 in)	80 kg (176 lb)	19 – 25 August 2006
PF	8	(Germany)	Masnic, Neil	2.06 m (6 ft 9 in)	102 kg (225 lb)	26 – 10 May 2000
SG	10	(United States)	Larry, Julian	1.90 m (6 ft 3 in)	86 kg (190 lb)	24 – 11 March 2002
SG	13	(Germany)	Ferber, Julius	1.94 m (6 ft 4 in)	85 kg (187 lb)	25 – 17 April 2001
C	14	(Germany)	Ehrich, Lukas	2.04 m (6 ft 8 in)	110 kg (243 lb)	21 – 31 October 2004
PG	17	(Germany)	Pahnke, Oliver	1.86 m (6 ft 1 in)	87 kg (192 lb)	28 – 2 June 1998
C	19	(Germany)	Touray, Adam	2.06 m (6 ft 9 in)	98 kg (216 lb)	32 – 31 May 1994
PF	22	(Germany)	Grühn, Cosmo (C)	2.01 m (6 ft 7 in)	105 kg (231 lb)	28 – 4 March 1998
PF	23	(United States)	Zurliene, Caleb	2.03 m (6 ft 8 in)	95 kg (209 lb)	24 – 5 February 2002
SG	24	(Germany)	Ani, Jason	1.91 m (6 ft 3 in)	100 kg (220 lb)	24 – 27 January 2002

Head coach

- (Germany) Götz Rohdewald

Assistant coach(es)

- (Germany) Thorben Döding
- (Germany) Felix Engel

Legend

- (C) Team captain
- Injured

- Roster
Updated: 31 October 2025

== Notable players ==
To appear in this section a player must have either:

– Set a club record or won an individual award as a professional player.
– Played at least one official international match for his senior national team at any time.

- (Germany) Andreas Seiferth
- (Bosnia and Herzegovina) Rijad Avdic
- (Spain) Jose Medina
- (Iceland) Hilmar Petursson
- (Romania) Tega Moceanu
- (Slovakia) Marek Dolezaj
- (Turkey) Cem Dinc
- (United States) Sean Black
- (United States) Marck Coffin
- (United States) David Hicks

== Head coaches ==
- (Germany) Phillip Kappenstein (2012–2021)
- (United States) Chad Prewitt (2021–2022)
- (Germany) Björn Harmsen (2022–2023)
- (Germany) Götz Rohdewald (2023–present)

== See also ==
- University of Münster
