= SG ART Giants Düsseldorf =

German basketball club

- Nickname: Giants
- Leagues: ProA
- Founded: 2016; 9 years ago
- Arena: Castello Düsseldorf
- Capacity: 3,700
- Location: Düsseldorf, Germany
- Team colors: black, white, blue, red
- Head coach: Achmadschah Zazai
- 2023/24 ProA position: 15th of 18
- Website: art-giants.de
Home	Away

SG ART Giants Düsseldorf, representing its professional team as ART Giants Düsseldorf, was a basketball club based in Düsseldorf, Germany. Their home arena was the Castello Düsseldorf, which seats 3,700 spectators.

== History ==
In 2008 Bayer Giants Leverkusen lost its Bundesliga licence which was given to the newly formed Giants Dusseldof which finished 12th in the 2008–09 Basketball Bundesliga. The club relegated the following season 2009-10.

In the 2015/16 season, two teams from Düsseldorf played in the German 4th tier Regionalliga West: the ART Düsseldorf and the Giants Düsseldorf. By season ending, both teams decided to join forces, creating a 500 member strong club. After the folding and bankruptcy of the former Giants Düsseldorf in 2010, it was the officials goal to create a "new basketball force at the Rhine". This was planned to be succeeded by funding and developing young players and a promotion of the first team to professional basketball leagues in the medium run.

The team won the 2018/19 1. Regionalliga West season championship and was thus promoted to the 2nd Bundesliga ProB, the third tear of German basketball leagues.

In the 2021/22 ProB season, the ART Giants finished the playoffs in the second place and were promoted to the second tier 2nd Bundesliga ProA. This promotion came along with moving to the Castello Düsseldorf, instead of the Comenius Gymnasium Gym, where the club formerly played its home games.

As a newcomer, the Giants finished the 2022/23 ProA season in 16th position, therefore they were able to avoid relegation.

In the summer of 2023, Marin Petrić took up the post of sports director. The playing operations of the second-division team were transferred to ART Giants Düsseldorf Spielbetriebs GmbH in 2023, with Thilo von Tongelen taking over the management.

The departure of the 2022/23 season's top performers Ryan Richmond (Melilla), Booker Coplin (Frankfurt Skyliners) and Lennart Boner (Phoenix Hagen) brought new challenges for the 2023/24 season.

After a good start into the season, but several losses before the end of the year 2023, the ART Giants parted ways with Florian Flabb and signed Andaç Yapicier as his successor.

The Giants started the 2024-25 season with 9 straight losses. Yapicier was released as head coach and replaced by Achmadschah Zazai. Zazai led the team to 5 victories within the next 9 games.

After the 2024-25 season the professional team surprisingly folded and withdrew their licence application. Structural problems, as well as blocades by certain persons in management positions that made it impossible to secure financial stability were named as cause.

== Notable players ==
To appear in this section a player must have either:

- Set a club record or won an individual award as a professional player.
- Played at least one official international match for his senior national team at any time.

- (Sweden) Craig Lecesne
- (United States) C.J. Anderson
- (United States) Marquill Smith
- (Germany) Alexander Richardson

== Team mascot ==
The team mascot was a Gorilla.
