= Science City Jena =

- Leagues: Basketball Bundesliga
- Founded: 1994; 32 years ago
- History: TuS Jena; 1994–2002; Baskets Jena; 2002–2007; Science City Jena; 2007–2021; Medipolis SC Jena; 2021–2024; Science City Jena; 2024–present
- Arena: Sparkassen Arena
- Capacity: 3,000
- Location: Jena, Germany
- Team colors: Blue, orange, yellow, white
- President: Dietmar Bendix
- Head coach: Steven Esterkamp
- Affiliation: Culture City Weimar
- Championships: 1 2. Basketball Bundesliga South (2007); 1 ProA (2016)
- Website: www.baskets-jena.de
Home	Away	Third

Science City Jena is a professional basketball club based in Jena, Germany. The team plays in the Basketball Bundesliga (BBL), the highest tier in Germany. Their home court is the Sparkassen Arena, which seats 3,000.

The team was known as Erdgas Baskets Jena through the 2006 season, then as POM Baskets Jena, then Science City Jena in 2007. After being renamed to Medipolis SC Jena in 2021 due to sponsoring reasons, the name Science City Jena was again used from the 2024/25 season on. In the 2015–16 season, they won their first ProA title and promoted to the Bundesliga.

== History ==
Although never a big sport in the former East Germany, basketball was played in Jena since the 1960s. In 1994, a new basketball program was found in the "Turn- und Sportverein (TuS) Jena". Starting in the lower divisions the club gained promotion to the second division (2. Liga Süd) in 2001. Once established in professional sports the club started to become a basketball only organization with the founding of the Baskets Jena GmbH which now holds the license.

The biggest success so far has been the promotion to the 1st division (BBL) in 2007. The stay in the top league lasted only one year with the club finishing last after an eventful year. With the promotion, the team switched to the bigger "JenArena" which allowed attendances up to 3.000 in a temporary construction. Financial difficulties in maintaining the "JenArena" led to a return to the gym "Werner-Seelenbinder-Halle".

In the 2015–16 season, Jena won the ProA championship by beating SC Rasta Vechta in the Finals and was promoted back to the Bundesliga.

In 2021, the team changed its name from Science City Jena to Medipolis SC Jena.

For the 2024–25, the team changed its name back to Science City Jena.

== Honours ==
- ProA

Champions: 2015–16

== Season by season ==
Season	Tier	League	Pos.	Cup	European competitions
2013–14	2	ProA	5th		
2014–15	2	ProA	5th		
2015–16	2	ProA	1st		
2016–17	1	Bundesliga	13th		
2017–18	1	Bundesliga	13th		
2018–19	1	Bundesliga	18th	Quarterfinals	
2019–20	2	ProA	4th		
2020–21	2	ProA	4th		
2021–22	2	ProA	3rd		
2022–23	2	ProA	15th		
2023–24	2	ProA	5th		
2024–25	2	ProA	2nd	First round	
2025–26	1	Bundesliga	16th	Quarterfinals	
2026–27	1	Bundesliga		First round	

== Players ==
=== Current roster ===
Note: Flags indicate national team eligibility at FIBA-sanctioned events. Players may hold other non-FIBA nationalities not displayed.

Science City Jena roster
Players
Coaches

Pos.	No.	Nat.	Name	Ht.	Wt.	Age
G	0	(Germany)	Bader, Maxim	1.92 m (6 ft 4 in)	93 kg (205 lb)	18 – 24 April 2008
SF	1	(United States)	Brooks II, Pierre	1.98 m (6 ft 6 in)	102 kg (225 lb)	23 – 20 December 2002
G	2	(Germany)	Falkenthal, Raphael	1.93 m (6 ft 4 in)	86 kg (190 lb)	21 – 17 June 2005
SG	3	(United States)	Baker Jr., Jemarl	1.96 m (6 ft 5 in)	93 kg (205 lb)	28 – 12 June 1998
G/F	5	(United States)	Edwards Jr., Terrence	1.98 m (6 ft 6 in)	89 kg (196 lb)	24 – 20 February 2002
F	8	(Germany)	Christen, Robin	2.02 m (6 ft 8 in)	105 kg (231 lb)	35 – 19 April 1991
F	10	(Germany)	Skladanowski, Christian	2.01 m (6 ft 7 in)	88 kg (194 lb)	22 – 19 April 2004
PG	11	(United States)	Moses, Isaiah	1.85 m (6 ft 1 in)	75 kg (165 lb)	24 – 19 November 2001
G/F	15	(United States)	Anim, Sacar	1.96 m (6 ft 5 in)	95 kg (209 lb)	29 – 19 September 1997
PF	24	(Germany)	Stuckman, Tanner	2.06 m (6 ft 9 in)	99 kg (218 lb)	28 – 5 December 1997
SF	25	(Germany)	Bank, Lorenz	1.98 m (6 ft 6 in)	95 kg (209 lb)	25 – 6 April 2001
G	32	(United States)	Perrantes, London	1.87 m (6 ft 2 in)	90 kg (198 lb)	32 – 3 October 1994
G	36	(Germany)	Krause, Kristofer	1.90 m (6 ft 3 in)	83 kg (183 lb)	26 – 6 March 2000
C	41	(United States) (Germany)	Herrera, Alex	2.06 m (6 ft 9 in)	112 kg (247 lb)	34 – 15 August 1992
F/C	44	(United States)	Lee, Ira	2.03 m (6 ft 8 in)	111 kg (245 lb)	28 – 19 March 1998

Head coach

- (United States) Steven Esterkamp

Assistant coach(es)

- (United States) Patrick Carney
- (Germany) Dominik Günthner

Physiotherapist(s)

- (Germany) Detlef Stanek
- (Germany) Matthias Passarge
- (Germany) Sara Dulle

Legend

- (C) Team captain
- Injured

- Roster
Updated: October 30, 2026

=== Depth chart ===
Pos.	Starting 5	Bench 1	Bench 2
C	Alex Herrera	Ira Lee	Robin Christen
PF	Tanner Stuckman	Christian Skladanowski	Pierre Brooks II
SF	Terrence Edwards Jr.	Lorenz Bank	Jemarl Baker Jr.
SG	Kristofer Krause	Sacar Anim	Maxim Bader
PG	London Perrantes	Isaiah Moses	Raphael Falkenthal

=== Notable players ===
Note: Flags indicate national team eligibility at FIBA-sanctioned events. Players may hold other non-FIBA nationalities not displayed.

Criteria

To appear in this section a player must have either:

- Set a club record or won an individual award while at the club
- Played at least one official international match for their national team at any time
- Played at least one official NBA match at any time.

- (United States) Mark Davis
- (Nigeria) Ike Iroegbu
- (United States) Julius Jenkins
- (United States) Immanuel McElroy
- (Czech Republic) Adam Pecháček
- (Germany) Johannes Voigtmann
- (United States) Kyle Weaver
