= 2019 FIBA U16 European Championship =

33rd FIBA Under-16 European Basketball Championship

Tournament details
- Host country: Italy
- City: Udine
- Dates: 9–17 August
- Teams: 16 (from FIBA Europe federations)
- Venues: 2

Final positions
- Champions: Spain (5th title)

Tournament statistics
- MVP: (Spain) Rubén Domínguez
- Top scorer: Emanuel Sharp
- Top rebounds: Saša Ciani
- Top assists: Nir Taub
- PPG (Team): Israel
- RPG (Team): Slovenia
- APG (Team): Israel

Official website
- www.fiba.basketball

The 2019 FIBA U16 European Championship was the 33rd edition of the Under-16 European Basketball Championship. The competition took place from 9 to 17 August 2019 in Udine, Italy. The top five teams qualified for the 2020 FIBA Under-17 Basketball World Cup besides Bulgaria who automatically qualified as host.

The defending champions were Croatia.

== Participating teams ==
- Bosnia and Herzegovina ▲ (2nd at 2018 FIBA U16 European Championship Division B)
- Croatia
- Estonia
- France
- Germany
- Greece
- Israel
- Italy
- Latvia
- Lithuania
- North Macedonia ▲ (3rd at 2018 FIBA U16 European Championship Division B)
- Russia ▲ (1st at 2018 FIBA U16 European Championship Division B)
- Serbia
- Slovenia
- Spain
- Turkey

== Venues ==
Udine	Pasian di Prato	2019 FIBA U16 European Championship is located in Italy
Palasport Primo Carnera	Palazzetto Mario Vecchiato	2019 FIBA U16 European Championship is located in Italy
Capacity: 3,850	Capacity:	2019 FIBA U16 European Championship is located in Italy

== Preliminary round ==
The draw ceremony was held on 13 December 2018 in Belgrade, Serbia.

=== Group A ===
Pos	Team	Pld	W	L	PF	PA	PD	Pts
1	Italy (H)	3	2	1	215	199	+16	5 (Note: Italy 1–1, +13 PD; Russia 1–1, −1 PD; Croatia 1–1, −12 PD)
2	Russia	3	2	1	214	210	+4	5
3	Croatia	3	2	1	184	188	−4	5
4	Germany	3	0	3	189	205	−16	3

Source: FIBA
Rules for classification: 1) Points; 2) Head-to-head results; 3) Points difference; 4) Points scored.
(H) Hosts
Notes:

9 August 2019
21:00

Boxscore

Russia	58–65	Croatia
Scoring by quarter: 6–15, 16–12, 26–20, 10–18
Pts: Niagu 16; Rebs: Niagu 12; Asts: Mozharovskiy 4		Pts: Brala 23; Rebs: T Ivišić 9 Asts: Brala, T Ivišić 4

Palazzetto Mario Vecchiato, Pasian di Prato

9 August 2019
21:00

Boxscore

Italy	66–63	Germany
Scoring by quarter: 12–20, 19–19, 17–10, 18–14
Pts: Spagnolo 19; Rebs: Onojaife 9 Asts: Giordano 4		Pts: Patrick 15; Rebs: Richardson 11; Asts: Lademacher, Marz 4

Palasport Primo Carnera, Udine

10 August 2019
16:30

Boxscore

Germany	65–70	Russia
Scoring by quarter: 8–26, 18–13, 20–16, 19–15
Pts: Hanzalek 15; Rebs: Hanzalek 8 Asts: Patrick 3		Pts: Mozharovskiy 16; Rebs: Niagu 13; Asts: Mozharovskiy 4

Palazzetto Mario Vecchiato, Pasian di Prato

10 August 2019
21:00

Boxscore

Croatia	50–69	Italy
Scoring by quarter: 6–20, 12–14, 16–18, 16–17
Pts: Brala, Pleadin 12; Rebs: T Ivišić 8 Asts: Brala, T Ivišić 3		Pts: Spagnolo 19; Rebs: Greggi 7 Asts: Casarin 4

Palasport Primo Carnera, Udine

11 August 2019
16:30

Boxscore

Germany	61–69	Croatia
Scoring by quarter: 23–18, 7–23, 16–15, 15–13
Pts: Schroder 12; Rebs: Dubbeldam 8 Asts: five players 2		Pts: Brala 28; Rebs: T Ivišić 11; Asts: Klarin 5

Palazzetto Mario Vecchiato, Pasian di Prato

11 August 2019
21:00

Boxscore

Russia	86–80	Italy
Scoring by quarter: 13–22, 27–15, 23–17, 23–26
Pts: Kolosov 16; Rebs: Niagu 7 Asts: three players 4		Pts: Casarin 28; Rebs: Spagnolo 10; Asts: Casarin 4

Palasport Primo Carnera, Udine

=== Group B ===
Pos	Team	Pld	W	L	PF	PA	PD	Pts
1	Spain	3	3	0	222	163	+59	6
2	Israel	3	2	1	230	220	+10	5
3	North Macedonia	3	1	2	211	213	−2	4
4	Latvia	3	0	3	160	227	−67	3

Source: FIBA
Rules for classification: 1) Points; 2) Head-to-head results; 3) Points difference; 4) Points scored.

9 August 2019
14:15

Boxscore

North Macedonia	57–61	Spain
Scoring by quarter: 12–19, 14–17, 12–14, 19–11
Pts: Mitrevski 18; Rebs: Simić, Hot 9 Asts: Nakov 5		Pts: Ordóñez 13; Rebs: Aquino, Núñez 6 Asts: Núñez 6

Palasport Primo Carnera, Udine

9 August 2019
16:30

Boxscore

Latvia	56–76	Israel
Scoring by quarter: 15–20, 10–21, 18–15, 13–20
Pts: Kļanskis 17; Rebs: Gedrovics 7 Asts: Briedis 5		Pts: Emanuel Sharp 19; Rebs: Gol 7 Asts: Taub 9

Palasport Primo Carnera, Udine

10 August 2019
14:15

Boxscore

Israel	99–90 (OT)	North Macedonia
Scoring by quarter: 21–18, 10–18, 14–26, 27–10, Overtime: 8–8, 8–8, 11–2
Pts: Sharp 35; Rebs: Gol 14; Asts: Gol 7		Pts: Mitrevski 22; Rebs: Simić 18; Asts: Nakov 6

Palazzetto Mario Vecchiato, Pasian di Prato

10 August 2019
21:00

Boxscore

Spain	87–51	Latvia
Scoring by quarter: 24–15, 21–11, 27–11, 15–14
Pts: Domínguez, Caicedo 14; Rebs: León 8 Asts: Ordóñez 4		Pts: Briedis 9 Rebs: Skreiveris 6 Asts: Briedis 8

Palazzetto Mario Vecchiato, Pasian di Prato

11 August 2019
16:30

Boxscore

Israel	55–74	Spain
Scoring by quarter: 15–23, 17–19, 11–18, 12–14
Pts: Maman, Sharp 12; Rebs: Shefer 7 Asts: Taub 8		Pts: Domínguez, Caicedo 12; Rebs: León 10; Asts: Naspler 4

Palasport Primo Carnera, Udine

11 August 2019
18:45

Boxscore

North Macedonia	64–53	Latvia
Scoring by quarter: 9–9, 21–16, 17–10, 17–18
Pts: Mitrevski 23; Rebs: Atanasov 11; Asts: Nakov 6		Pts: Struza 12; Rebs: Kļanskis 8 Asts: Briedis 5

Palasport Primo Carnera, Udine

=== Group C ===
Pos	Team	Pld	W	L	PF	PA	PD	Pts
1	Turkey	3	3	0	241	179	+62	6
2	Lithuania	3	2	1	239	203	+36	5
3	Slovenia	3	1	2	184	202	−18	4
4	Estonia	3	0	3	166	246	−80	3

Source: FIBA
Rules for classification: 1) Points; 2) Head-to-head results; 3) Points difference; 4) Points scored.

9 August 2019
14:15

Boxscore

Slovenia	52–74	Turkey
Scoring by quarter: 8–23, 14–17, 20–17, 10–17
Pts: three players 9 Rebs: Ciani 8 Asts: Ivankovič 3		Pts: Bona 18; Rebs: Bona 10; Asts: Tuna 7

Palazzetto Mario Vecchiato, Pasian di Prato

9 August 2019
16:30

Boxscore

Lithuania	94–56	Estonia
Scoring by quarter: 30–16, 14–15, 26–16, 24–9
Pts: Kojenets 15; Rebs: Murauskas 9 Asts: Kneižys 5		Pts: Kilk 13; Rebs: Veesaar, Reinart 4 Asts: Kuusmaa 3

Palazzetto Mario Vecchiato, Pasian di Prato

10 August 2019
18:45

Boxscore

Estonia	63–68	Slovenia
Scoring by quarter: 14–13, 19–29, 16–14, 14–13
Pts: Reinart 17; Rebs: Reinart 15; Asts: Reinart 4		Pts: Klavžar 18; Rebs: Ciani 8 Asts: Ivankovič 5

Palasport Primo Carnera, Udine

10 August 2019
14:15

Boxscore

Turkey	83–80 (OT)	Lithuania
Scoring by quarter: 19–23, 18–9, 18–18, 18–23, Overtime: 10–7
Pts: Türk 17; Rebs: Bona 12; Asts: Uzun, Büyükcangaz 5		Pts: Baltrušaitis 14; Rebs: Kojenets 10; Asts: Kneižys, Sargiūnas 4

Palasport Primo Carnera, Udine

11 August 2019
18:45

Boxscore

Estonia	47–84	Turkey
Scoring by quarter: 13–33, 14–17, 6–17, 14–17
Pts: Reinart 11; Rebs: Veesaar 9 Asts: Kroos, Reinart 2		Pts: Bona 14; Rebs: Doğan 13; Asts: Peksarı 6

Palazzetto Mario Vecchiato, Pasian di Prato

11 August 2019
21:00

Boxscore

Slovenia	64–65	Lithuania
Scoring by quarter: 19–17, 17–17, 18–10, 10–21
Pts: Ciani 13; Rebs: Mirtič, Ciani 12; Asts: Ivankovič 5		Pts: Murauskas 18; Rebs: Kojenets 10; Asts: Sargiūnas 7

Palazzetto Mario Vecchiato, Pasian di Prato

=== Group D ===
Pos	Team	Pld	W	L	PF	PA	PD	Pts
1	France	3	3	0	230	159	+71	6
2	Serbia	3	2	1	221	185	+36	5
3	Greece	3	1	2	186	179	+7	4
4	Bosnia and Herzegovina	3	0	3	142	256	−114	3

Source: FIBA
Rules for classification: 1) Points; 2) Head-to-head results; 3) Points difference; 4) Points scored.

9 August 2019
18:45

Boxscore

Bosnia and Herzegovina	38–102	France
Scoring by quarter: 13–32, 5–25, 12–17, 8–28
Pts: Mulić 7 Rebs: Puce 4 Asts: Ješić 3		Pts: Y. Traore 13; Rebs: Dessert 10; Asts: Dieng 7

Palazzetto Mario Vecchiato, Pasian di Prato

9 August 2019
18:45

Boxscore

Serbia	77–55	Greece
Scoring by quarter: 9–16, 28–8, 23–19, 17–12
Pts: Radovanović 26; Rebs: Belić 8 Asts: Milijašević 5		Pts: Bazinas 20; Rebs: Tsolakis 7 Asts: Petanidis 3

Palasport Primo Carnera, Udine

10 August 2019
16:30

Boxscore

Greece	77–43	Bosnia and Herzegovina
Scoring by quarter: 20–20, 14–9, 30–8, 13–6
Pts: Mantzoukas 16; Rebs: Giannopoulos 8 Asts: Bazinas 6		Pts: Mulić 13; Rebs: Bojanić 7 Asts: three players 2

Palasport Primo Carnera, Udine

10 August 2019
18:45

Boxscore

France	69–67	Serbia
Scoring by quarter: 22–24, 11–16, 15–13, 21–14
Pts: Dieng 17; Rebs: Wembanyama 10; Asts: De Sousa 5		Pts: Radovanović 20; Rebs: Radovanović 9 Asts: Petrović 4

Palazzetto Mario Vecchiato, Pasian di Prato

11 August 2019
14:15

Boxscore

Greece	54–59	France
Scoring by quarter: 12–11, 13–8, 13–13, 16–27
Pts: Bazinas 14; Rebs: Mantzoukas 11; Asts: Bazinas 4		Pts: Y. Traore 13; Rebs: A. Traore 6 Asts: Dieng 4

Palasport Primo Carnera, Udine

11 August 2019
14:15

Boxscore

Bosnia and Herzegovina	61–77	Serbia
Scoring by quarter: 11–25, 17–15, 12–19, 21–18
Pts: Radinović 16; Rebs: Bojanić 7 Asts: Ješić 4		Pts: Šaranović 16; Rebs: Belić 10; Asts: Stefanović 5

Palazzetto Mario Vecchiato, Pasian di Prato

== Final round ==
=== Main bracket ===
Round of 16
13 August
A1 Italy (H)	82
B4 Latvia	62
13 August
C2 Lithuania	56
D3 Greece	67
13 August
B2 Israel	65
A3 Croatia	66
13 August
D1 France	70
C4 Estonia	44
13 August
A2 Russia	70
B3 North Macedonia	45
13 August
C1 Turkey	87
D4 Bosnia and Herzegovina	65
13 August
B1 Spain	62
A4 Germany	60
13 August
D2 Serbia	67
C3 Slovenia	64

Quarterfinals
14 August
A1 Italy (H)	64
D3 Greece	63
14 August
A3 Croatia	78
D1 France	80
14 August
A2 Russia	73
C1 Turkey	70
14 August
B1 Spain	72
D2 Serbia	71

Semifinals
16 August
A1 Italy (H)	56
D1 France	73
16 August
A2 Russia	53
B1 Spain	81

Final
17 August
B1 Spain	70
D1 France	61
3rd place game
17 August
A1 Italy (H)	73
A2 Russia	68

=== Round of 16 ===
13 August 2019
14:15

Boxscore

Turkey	87–65	Bosnia and Herzegovina
Scoring by quarter: 21–13, 30–23, 24–10, 12–19
Pts: Tuna, Türk 14; Rebs: Bona 16; Asts: Peksarı 8		Pts: Mulić 13; Rebs: Čović 4 Asts: Milić 3

Palasport Primo Carnera, Udine

13 August 2019
14:15

Boxscore

Serbia	67–64	Slovenia
Scoring by quarter: 17–20, 16–15, 16–13, 18–16
Pts: Belić 22; Rebs: Radovanović 14; Asts: Stefanović, Petrović 3		Pts: Klavzar 22; Rebs: Ciani 15; Asts: Ivankovič 3

Palazzetto Mario Vecchiato, Pasian di Prato

13 August 2019
16:30

Boxscore

Russia	70–45	North Macedonia
Scoring by quarter: 11–7, 19–11, 16–7, 24–20
Pts: Rumsha 12; Rebs: Panov 11; Asts: Evdokimov 6		Pts: Mitrevski 14; Rebs: Velichkovski 6 Asts: Mitrevski, Nakov 3

Palasport Primo Carnera, Udine

13 August 2019
16:30

Boxscore

Spain	62–60	Germany
Scoring by quarter: 22–12, 13–12, 19–15, 8–21
Pts: Domínguez 15; Rebs: León 9 Asts: Núñez 6		Pts: Schroder 12; Rebs: Hanzalek 10; Asts: Rataj 6

Palazzetto Mario Vecchiato, Pasian di Prato

13 August 2019
18:45

Boxscore

Lithuania	56–67	Greece
Scoring by quarter: 10–10, 17–15, 13–25, 16–17
Pts: Baltrusaitis 13; Rebs: Baltrusaitis 12; Asts: Sargiūnas, Murauskas 3		Pts: Mantzoukas 20; Rebs: Bazinas 9 Asts: Bazinas 5

Palasport Primo Carnera, Udine

13 August 2019
18:45

Boxscore

France	70–44	Estonia
Scoring by quarter: 13–10, 18–18, 22–9, 17–7
Pts: Traore 23; Rebs: Dessert 11; Asts: De Sousa 6		Pts: Kuuba 11; Rebs: Veesaar 9 Asts: Reinart 5

Palazzetto Mario Vecchiato, Pasian di Prato

13 August 2019
21:00

Boxscore

Italy	82–62	Latvia
Scoring by quarter: 19–22, 18–18, 24–11, 21–11
Pts: Spagnolo, Marangoni 18; Rebs: Spagnolo 12; Asts: Spagnolo 8		Pts: Farenhorsts 18; Rebs: Grimbergs 14; Asts: Gedrovics, Farenhorsts 3

Palasport Primo Carnera, Udine

13 August 2019
21:00

Boxscore

Israel	65–66	Croatia
Scoring by quarter: 22–16, 10–20, 19–13, 14–17
Pts: Sharp 29; Rebs: Sharp, Gol 7 Asts: Taub, Gol 5		Pts: Z Ivišić 27; Rebs: T Ivišić 19; Asts: Pleadin 6

Palazzetto Mario Vecchiato, Pasian di Prato

=== Quarterfinals ===
14 August 2019
14:15

Boxscore

Spain	72–71 (OT)	Serbia
Scoring by quarter: 18–17, 17–10, 5–17, 17–13, Overtime: 15–14
Pts: Núñez 19; Rebs: Sanchez 8 Asts: Núñez 4		Pts: Belić 28; Rebs: Belić 14; Asts: Stefanović, Milijašević 2

Palasport Primo Carnera, Udine

14 August 2019
16:30

Boxscore

Russia	73–70	Turkey
Scoring by quarter: 18–15, 16–19, 20–23, 19–13
Pts: Kolosov 28; Rebs: Niagu 10; Asts: Mozharovskiy, Rumsha 6		Pts: Yılmaz 15; Rebs: Turk 11; Asts: Tuna 5

Palasport Primo Carnera, Udine

14 August 2019
18:45

Boxscore

Croatia	78–80 (OT)	France
Scoring by quarter: 14–17, 19–20, 14–11, 25–24, Overtime: 6–8
Pts: Ivišić 25; Rebs: Santić 10; Asts: Klarin 10		Pts: Traoré 18; Rebs: Wembanyama 21; Asts: Mienandi 7

Palasport Primo Carnera, Udine

14 August 2019
21:00

Boxscore

Italy	64–63	Greece
Scoring by quarter: 10–25, 23–13, 13–9, 18–16
Pts: Casarin 20; Rebs: Onojaife 9 Asts: Casarin 5		Pts: Oikonomopoulos 18; Rebs: Mantzoukas 12; Asts: Oikonomopoulos 4

Palasport Primo Carnera, Udine

=== Semifinals ===
16 August 2019
18:45

Boxscore

Russia	53–81	Spain
Scoring by quarter: 15–21, 15–23, 17–23, 6–14
Pts: Kolosov 16; Rebs: three players 7 Asts: Mozharovskiy 3		Pts: Domínguez 19; Rebs: León, Naspler 6 Asts: Domínguez 6

Palasport Primo Carnera, Udine

16 August 2019
21:00

Boxscore

Italy	56–73	France
Scoring by quarter: 10–29, 19–13, 8–18, 19–13
Pts: Spagnolo 16; Rebs: three players 5 Asts: Fiusco 4		Pts: Dieng 17; Rebs: Wenbanyama 13; Asts: Dieng, Wembanyama 5

Palasport Primo Carnera, Udine

=== Third place game ===
17 August 2019
18:45

Boxscore

Italy	73–68	Russia
Scoring by quarter: 20–11, 11–20, 18–18, 24–19
Pts: Casarin 14; Rebs: Spagnolo, Onojaife 6 Asts: Casarin 6		Pts: Niagu 20; Rebs: Niagu 13; Asts: Evdokimov 6

Palasport Primo Carnera, Udine

=== Final ===
17 August 2019
21:00

Boxscore

France	61–70	Spain
Scoring by quarter: 11–15, 9–17, 20–20, 21–18
Pts: three players 10; Rebs: Wembanyama 12; Asts: Bal 2		Pts: Caicedo, Núñez 21; Rebs: Núñez 6 Asts: Naspler, Núñez 3

Palasport Primo Carnera, Udine
Attendance: 1500
Referees: Marius Ciulin (ROU), Beniamino Manuel Attard (ITA), Vladimir Jevtović (SRB)

== 5th–8th place classification ==
5th–8th place semifinals
16 August
D3 Greece	92
A3 Croatia	83
16 August
C1 Turkey	74
D2 Serbia	65

5th place game
17 August
D3 Greece	62
C1 Turkey	75
7th place game
17 August
A3 Croatia	81
D2 Serbia	99

=== 5th–8th place semifinals ===
16 August 2019
14:15

Boxscore

Turkey	74–65	Serbia
Scoring by quarter: 9–21, 17–15, 24–11, 24–18
Pts: Bona 19; Rebs: Bona 14; Asts: Tuna 4		Pts: Belić 18; Rebs: Belić 14; Asts: Belić 4

Palasport Primo Carnera, Udine

16 August 2019
16:30

Boxscore

Greece	92–84	Croatia
Scoring by quarter: 22–19, 28–23, 15–19, 27–23
Pts: Oikonomopoulos 22; Rebs: Mantzoukas 11; Asts: Bazinas 11		Pts: Pleadin 24; Rebs: Brala 8 Asts: Brala 8

Palasport Primo Carnera, Udine

=== Seventh place game ===
17 August 2019
17:45

Boxscore

Croatia	81–99	Serbia
Scoring by quarter: 23–16, 19–26, 13–33, 26–24
Pts: Pleadin 26; Rebs: Z Ivišić, T Ivišić 6 Asts: Klarin 7		Pts: Belić 34; Rebs: Branković 9 Asts: Branković 7

Palazzetto Mario Vecchiato, Pasian di Prato

=== Fifth place game ===
17 August 2019
14:15

Boxscore

Greece	62–75	Turkey
Scoring by quarter: 17–24, 13–17, 11–22, 21–12
Pts: Mantzoukas 19; Rebs: Mantzoukas 10; Asts: Bazinas 6		Pts: Bona 20; Rebs: Bona 11; Asts: Tuna 9

Palasport Primo Carnera, Udine

== 9th–16th place classification ==
9th–16th place quarterfinals
14 August
B2 Israel	83
C4 Estonia	53
14 August
B4 Latvia	63
C2 Lithuania	93
14 August
B3 North Macedonia	76
D4 Bosnia and Herzegovina	64
14 August
A4 Germany	65
C3 Slovenia	72

9th–12th place semifinals
16 August
B2 Israel	80
C2 Lithuania	93
16 August
B3 North Macedonia	80
C3 Slovenia	87

9th place
17 August
C2 Lithuania	91
C3 Slovenia	77
11th place game
17 August
B2 Israel	83
B3 North Macedonia	72

=== 9th–16th place quarterfinals ===
14 August 2019
14:15

Boxscore

Germany	65–72	Slovenia
Scoring by quarter: 16–14, 18–21, 11–20, 20–17
Pts: Rataj 16; Rebs: Richardson 9 Asts: Hanzalek 8		Pts: Ciani 19; Rebs: Ciani 15; Asts: Mirtič 4

Palazzetto Mario Vecchiato, Pasian di Prato

14 August 2019
16:30

Boxscore

North Macedonia	76–64	Bosnia and Herzegovina
Scoring by quarter: 19–20, 14–14, 30–14, 13–16
Pts: Mitrevski 25; Rebs: Nakov 9 Asts: Mitrevski 5		Pts: Mulić 15; Rebs: Bojanić 10; Asts: Puce 4

Palazzetto Mario Vecchiato, Pasian di Prato

14 August 2019
18:45

Boxscore

Israel	83–53	Estonia
Scoring by quarter: 19–19, 26–9, 22–11, 16–14
Pts: Sharp 27; Rebs: Taub 9 Asts: Taub 8		Pts: Kilk 14; Rebs: Sepp 11; Asts: Kuuba 3

Palazzetto Mario Vecchiato, Pasian di Prato

14 August 2019
21:00

Boxscore

Latvia	63–93	Lithuania
Scoring by quarter: 12–25, 12–21, 24–24, 15–23
Pts: Teirumnieks 15; Rebs: Grimbergs 6 Asts: Teirumnieks 4		Pts: Kojenets 17; Rebs: Murauskas 8 Asts: Sargiūnas 7

Palazzetto Mario Vecchiato, Pasian di Prato

=== 9th–12th place semifinals ===
16 August 2019
18:45

Boxscore

Lithuania	93–80	Israel
Scoring by quarter: 15–16, 23–19, 27–19, 28–26
Pts: Murauskas 23; Rebs: Butkus 10; Asts: Lelevicius, Kneižys 6		Pts: Sharp 29; Rebs: Sharp 12; Asts: Taub, Maman 5

Palazzetto Mario Vecchiato, Pasian di Prato

16 August 2019
21:00

Boxscore

North Macedonia	80–87	Slovenia
Scoring by quarter: 15–21, 20–22, 20–17, 25–27
Pts: Memed 28; Rebs: Simić 9 Asts: Memed, Nakov 5		Pts: Krizanic 23; Rebs: Ciani 13; Asts: Klavžar, Ivankovič 4

Palazzetto Mario Vecchiato, Pasian di Prato

=== 11th place game ===
17 August 2019
13:15

Boxscore

Israel	83–72	North Macedonia
Scoring by quarter: 24–22, 13–17, 21–22, 25–11
Pts: Sharp 24; Rebs: Sharp, Gol 7 Asts: Taub 6		Pts: Nakov 20; Rebs: Nakov 9 Asts: Nakov, Simic 3

Palazzetto Mario Vecchiato, Pasian di Prato

=== 9th place game ===
17 August 2019
15:30

Boxscore

Lithuania	91–77	Slovenia
Scoring by quarter: 25–24, 20–8, 22–20, 24–25
Pts: Murauskas 16; Rebs: three players 5 Asts: Sargiūnas 7		Pts: Klavžar 18; Rebs: Ciani 9 Asts: Ivankovič 3

Palazzetto Mario Vecchiato, Pasian di Prato

== 13th–16th place classification ==
13–16th place semifinals
16 August
C4 Estonia	62
B4 Latvia	71
16 August
D4 Bosnia and Herzegovina	58
A4 Germany	97

13th place
17 August
B4 Latvia	79
A4 Germany	67
15th place game
17 August
C4 Estonia	63
D4 Bosnia and Herzegovina	55

=== 13th–16th place semifinals ===
16 August 2019
14:15

Boxscore

Bosnia and Herzegovina	58–97	Germany
Scoring by quarter: 10–37, 15–23, 18–27, 15–10
Pts: Bojanić, Čolak 12; Rebs: Bojanić 7 Asts: Rebić, Ješić 3		Pts: Patrick 22; Rebs: Brockhoff 8 Asts: Wulff 4

Palazzetto Mario Vecchiato, Pasian di Prato

16 August 2019
16:30

Boxscore

Latvia	71–62	Estonia
Scoring by quarter: 17–12, 17–10, 20–11, 17–29
Pts: Arbidans 17; Rebs: Arbidans 7 Asts: Three players 4		Pts: Kuusmaa 17; Rebs: Reinart, Sepp 8 Asts: Kuusmaa 4

Palazzetto Mario Vecchiato, Pasian di Prato

=== 15th place game ===
17 August 2019
11:00

Boxscore

Estonia	63–55	Bosnia and Herzegovina
Scoring by quarter: 11–9, 17–19, 19–18, 16–9
Pts: Veesaar 18; Rebs: Veesaar 12; Asts: Reinart 5		Pts: Radinović 13; Rebs: Bojanić 13; Asts: Bojanić 3

Palazzetto Mario Vecchiato, Pasian di Prato

=== 13th place game ===
17 August 2019
16:30

Boxscore

Latvia	79–67	Germany
Scoring by quarter: 18–15, 31–13, 19–24, 11–15
Pts: Briedis 17; Rebs: Briedis 10; Asts: Farenhorsts 7		Pts: Hanzalek 13; Rebs: Richardson 11; Asts: Hanzalek 7

Palasport Primo Carnera, Udine

== Final standings ==
Rank	Team	Record
1st place, gold medalist(s)	Spain	7–0
2nd place, silver medalist(s)	France	6–1
3rd place, bronze medalist(s)	Italy	5–2
4	Russia	4–3
5	Turkey	6–1
6	Greece	3–4
7	Serbia	4–3
8	Croatia	3–4
9	Lithuania	5–2
10	Slovenia	3–4
11	Israel	4–3
12	North Macedonia	2–5
13	Latvia	2–5
14	Germany	1–6
15	Estonia	1–6
16	Bosnia and Herzegovina	0–7

Qualified for the 2020 FIBA Under-17 Basketball World Cup
Relegated to the 2022 FIBA U16 European Championship Division B

== Awards ==
Most Valuable Player
(Spain) Rubén Domínguez

All-Tournament Team

- (Spain) Juan Núñez
- (Italy) Matteo Spagnolo
- (Spain) Rubén Domínguez
- (Turkey) Adem Bona
- (France) Victor Wembanyama
