= Pat Elzie =

American-German basketball player and coach (born 1960)

Personal information
- Born: November 22, 1960 (age 65) Troy, Missouri, US
- Listed height: 6 ft 6 in (1.98 m)

Career information
- College: Holy Cross (1980–1984)
- NBA draft: 1984: undrafted
- Playing career: 1984–1996
- Position: Head coach

Career history

Coaching
- 1996–1999: Paderborn
- 1999–2001: TV Langen
- 2001–2003: BCJ Hamburg Tigers
- 2003: Syria
- 2004: Rist Wedel
- 2004–2006: Tigers Tübingen
- 2006–2007: BG Karlsruhe
- 2007–2008: Kirchheim Knights
- 2009: Eisbären Bremerhaven
- 2009: BMC Larnaka
- 2009–2015: SC Rasta Vechta
- 2015–2022: Itzehoe Eagles
- 2022–2024: EPG Baskets Koblenz
- 2024–2025: Artland Dragons

Patrick Elzie (born November 22, 1960) is an American-German professional basketball coach and former professional player. He played collegiately at Holy Cross and professionally in Europe. He acquired German citizenship in 1994.

== Playing career ==
Born in Troy, Missouri, Elzie later moved to Wentzville, Missouri with his family. A 6'8 (203 cm) power forward, he appeared in a total of 109 games for the Holy Cross Crusaders between 1980 and 1984, averaging 7.6 points and 6.4 rebounds a contest. He kicked off his professional career with MTV Gießen of the German Basketball Bundesliga in 1984 and stayed with the team until 1987. After spending the 1987–88 campaign with Hageby Basket in Sweden's top-flight, Elzie returned to Gießen, where he played another two years, followed by stints at other German teams including TV Lich (1989–94), TuS Bramsche, SG Braunschweig (1994–95) and BCJ Hamburg (1995–96).

== Coaching career ==
After serving as player-coach in Braunschweig, Elzie became a full-time head coach at Paderborn in 1996. After a three-year stint, he took over the head coaching position at Langen and then returned to BCJ Hamburg in 2001. He led BCJ to the championship in the 2. Basketball Bundesliga in 2002, however, the team then folded due to insolvency.

After a short tenure as head coach of the Syrian men's national team in 2003 and at SC Rist Wedel, Elzie was named head coach of the Walter Tigers Tübingen in Germany's top-flight Bundesliga in 2004. After parting ways with Tübingen in January 2006, he served as associate head coach at BG Karlsruhe in the first half of the 2006–07 season, before moving to second-division side Kirchheim Knights, where he took over the head coaching job in January 2007. He stayed on that job until the end of the 2007–08 campaign.

In 2008, Elzie was appointed as sport director of the Bremen Roosters in the German second-tier, but parted company with the organization in January 2009. He then served as assistant coach of Bundesliga outfit Eisbären Bremerhaven for the remainder of the 2008–09 season.

After a brief stint as head coach of BMC Larnaka in Cyprus, Elzie returned to Germany, taking over the head coaching reigns for SC Rasta Vechta in 2009. He would guide the team from Germany's third-level league ProB to the top-flight Bundesliga within four years. After steering Rasta to the 2012 ProA championship, Elzie earned Eurobasket.com All-German 2.Bundesliga Pro A Coach of the Year honors. He left his head coaching job after the conclusion of the 2013–14 season, which had ended in relegation from the Bundesliga. Elzie stayed with the club, working as director of the youth development program, before returning to head coach in January 2015. He then left Vechta at the end of the 2014–15 season and was named head coach of German ProB side Itzehoe Eagles in May 2015. Elzie was named ProB Coach of the Year after leading Itzehoe to the regular season championship in 2019–20. Afterwards, the season was stalled because of the COVID-19 pandemic. He led the Itzehoe Eagles to the ProB finals in 2020–21 which were not played due to the ongoing impact of the pandemic. By reaching the ProB finals, Elzie's Itzehoe side earned the right to promotion to the ProA ranks for the second straight year. In 2020, the club had declined promotion to the next tier for infrastructural and financial reasons.

Elzie and his Itzehoe team suffered relegation from the ProA in 2022. He stepped down from his position as Itzehoe head coach shortly after the conclusion of the 2021–22 season and was appointed head coach of German ProB side EPG Baskets Koblenz on June 30, 2022. He led them to a ProB championship in 2022-23 and to promotion to the German second division, ProA. Elzie picked up Eurobasket.com ProB Coach of the Year honors in the 2022-23 campaign. He was sacked by the Koblenz side on January 4, 2024.

On March 14, 2024, Elzie was appointed as sporting director of German ProA side Artland Dragons to start May 1, 2024. On November 11, 2024, he became also the head coach of the team. In eight ProA games under Elzie's guidance, the Artland side remained winless. On January 9, 2025, he handed the coaching job over to his assistant. The club cited illness as the reason behind the end of Elzie's tenure who continued his job as sporting director. He remained Artland's sporting director until the end of the 2024-25 season.
