= İsmet Akpınar =

German basketball player (born 1995)

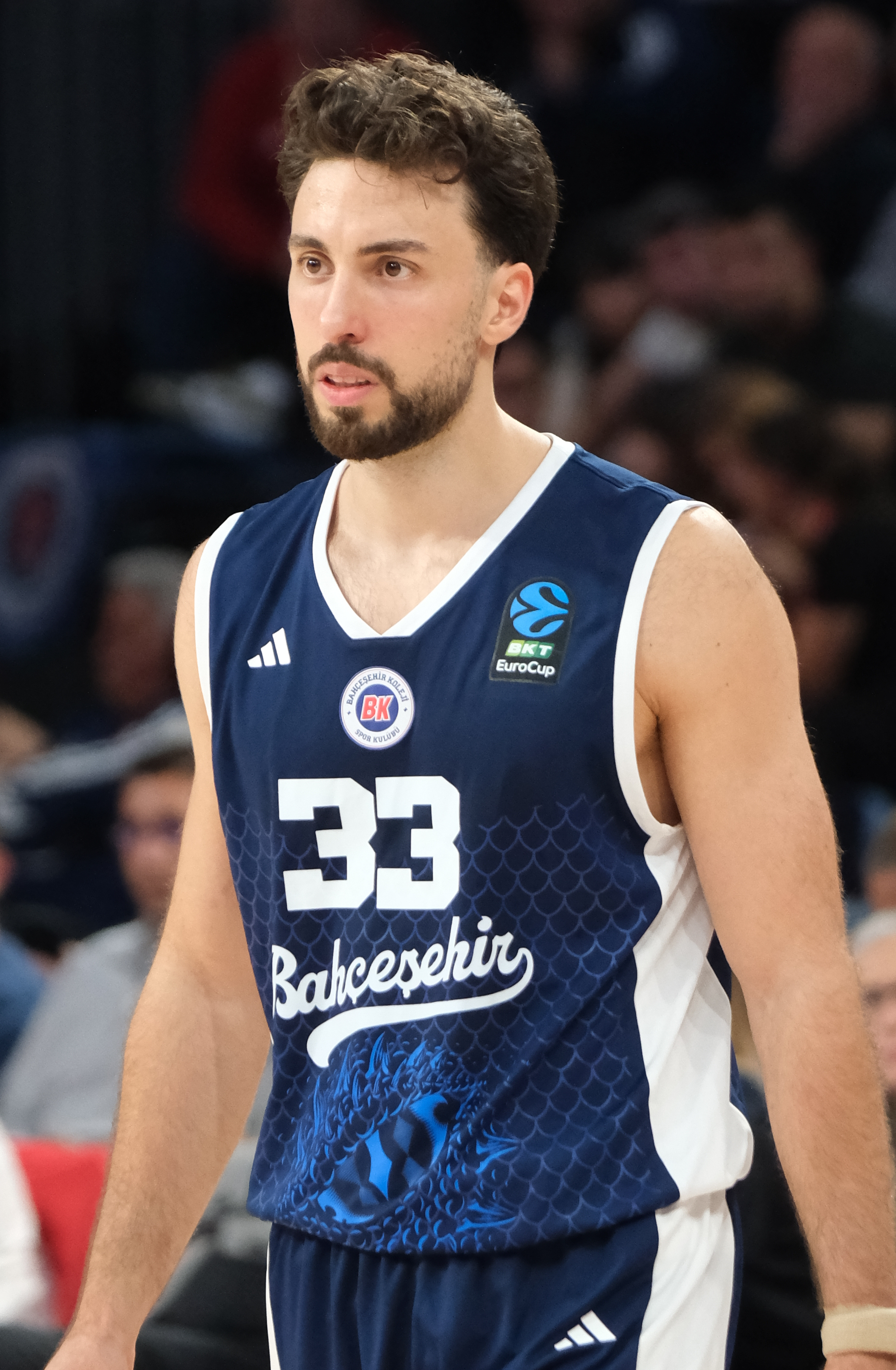
- Akpınar with Bahçeşehir Koleji in 2025

No. 5 – Bahçeşehir Koleji
- Position: Point guard / shooting guard
- League: Basketbol Süper Ligi

Personal information
- Born: May 22, 1995 (age 31) Hamburg, Germany
- Listed height: 6 ft 3 in (1.91 m)
- Listed weight: 169 lb (77 kg)

Career information
- Playing career: 2011–present

Career history
- 2011–2013: Rist Wedel
- 2013–2017: Alba Berlin
- 2017–2019: Ulm
- 2019–2020: Beşiktaş
- 2020: Bayern Munich
- 2020–2021: Bahçeşehir Koleji
- 2021–2023: Fenerbahçe
- 2023–2024: Galatasaray
- 2024–2025: Türk Telekom
- 2025–present: Bahçeşehir Koleji

Career highlights
- Turkish League champion (2022); BBL Best German Young Player (2017); 2× BBL All-Star (2018, 2019); BBL All-Star Game MVP (2019); 2× German Cup winner (2014, 2016); 2× German Supercup winner (2013, 2014)

Ismet Akpınar (Turkish: İsmet Akpınar, born May 22, 1995) is a Turkish-German professional basketball player for Bahçeşehir Koleji of the Turkish Basketbol Süper Ligi (BSL).

== Early years ==
Akpınar started his career in the BC Hamburg youth ranks. At the age of 16, he made his professional debut with SC Rist Wedel in the ProB, the third tier of German basketball, earning Eurobasket.com All-German ProB Rookie of the Year honors following the 2011–12 season. At the same time, he excelled at the youth level playing for Piraten Hamburg and was named JBBL (under-16 Bundesliga) Player of the Year in 2011 as well as NBBL (under-19 Bundesliga) Rookie of the Year the following season.

== Professional career ==
In February 2013, Akpınar agreed on a four-year deal with Bundesliga side Alba Berlin. In the 2016-17 season, he received the BBL Best German Young Player Award.

On June 7, 2017, he signed with ratiopharm Ulm. In the 2017–18 season, he was invited for the BBL All-Star Game for the first time in his career. In 2019, Akpinar played in his second All-Star Game and was MVP of the match.

=== Beşiktaş Sompo Japan ===
On July 30, 2019, he has signed contract with Beşiktaş Sompo Japan of the Basketbol Süper Ligi.

=== Bayern Munich ===
On May 25, 2020, he has signed with Bayern Munich of the Basketball Bundesliga (BBL).

=== Bahçeşehir Koleji ===
On July 11, 2020, he has signed with Bahçeşehir Koleji of the Turkish Basketball Super League (BSL).

=== Fenerbahçe ===
On June 18, 2021, he signed a two-year contract with Fenerbahçe of the Turkish Basketball Super League (BSL) and the EuroLeague. On June 22, 2023, he parted ways with the club.

=== Galatasaray Ekmas ===
On June 26, 2023, he signed with Galatasaray Nef of the Turkish Basketbol Süper Ligi (BSL).

=== Türk Telekom ===
On June 5, 2024, he signed with Türk Telekom of the Turkish Basketbol Süper Ligi (BSL).

=== Return to Bahçeşehir Koleji ===
On July 4, 2025, he signed with Bahçeşehir Koleji of the Turkish Basketbol Süper Ligi (BSL) for a second stint.

== National team ==
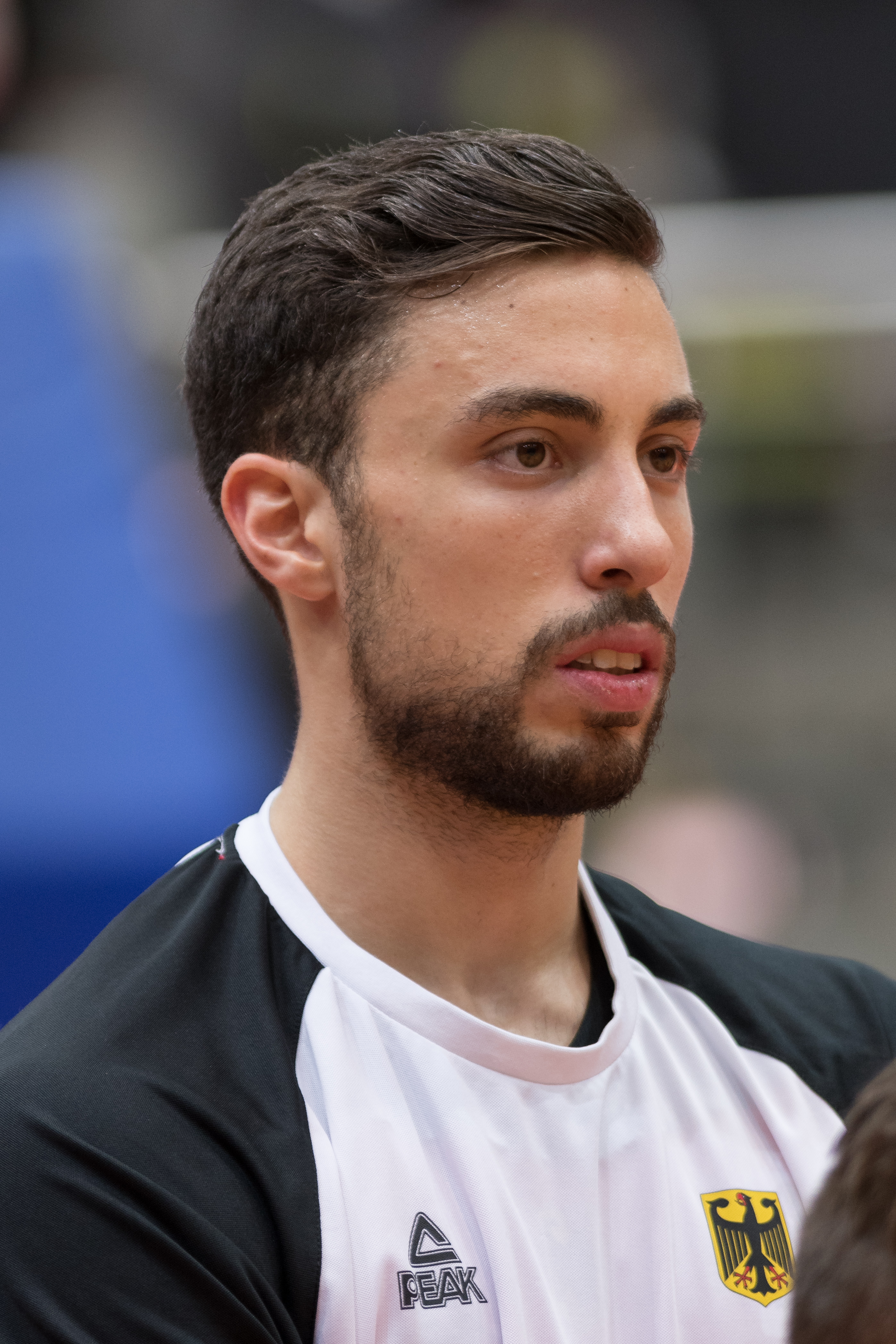
Akpınar with Germany in 2017

Akpınar has represented the German Junior National Teams on many occasions. In August 2010, he played in the North Sea Development Basketball Cup, guiding the German under-15 squad to a second-place finish.

He was with the Germany U16 National Team, competing in the 2011 under-16 European Championships, and was selected to play for Germany's U18 team at the 2012 Albert-Schweitzer-Tournament as well as at the 2012 and 2013 under-18 European Championships. In 2014 and 2015, he played for his country in the under-20 European Championships. In the summer of 2017, he was capped for the first time for Germany's men's national team.

== Career statistics ==
Legend
GP	Games played	GS	Games started	MPG	Minutes per game
FG%	Field-goal percentage	3P%	3-point field-goal percentage	FT%	Free-throw percentage
RPG	Rebounds per game	APG	Assists per game	SPG	Steals per game
BPG	Blocks per game	PPG	Points per game	PIR	Performance index rating
**Bold**	Career high

=== EuroLeague ===
Year	Team	GP	GS	MPG	FG%	3P%	FT%	RPG	APG	SPG	BPG	PPG	PIR
2014–15	Alba Berlin	5	0	5.4	.333	.500	.000	.4	.6	**.4**	.0	1.6	.4
2021–22	Fenerbahçe	**14**	**3**	**11.4**	.429	.417	**.909**	**.7**	**.9**	.1	**.1**	**4.8**	**2.8**
2022–23	Fenerbahçe	5	1	6.2	**1.000**	**.667**	.000	.4	.4	.2	.0	3.2	1.4
Career		24	4	9.3	.462	.457	.909	.6	.8	.2	.0	3.8	2.0

=== Eurocup ===
Year	Team	GP	GS	MPG	FG%	3P%	FT%	RPG	APG	SPG	BPG	PPG	PIR
2013–14	Alba Berlin	1	0	1.4	.000	.000	.000	.0	.0	.0	.0	.0	.0
2015–16	Alba Berlin	**18**	0	12.1	.417	.321	.720	.7	.4	.3	.2	3.6	.8
2016–17	Alba Berlin	14	5	11.5	**.600**	.259	**1.000**	1.2	1.2	.0	.1	3.6	2.6
2017–18	Ulm	9	8	20.4	.419	.273	.882	**2.0**	2.0	**.7**	.3	6.6	5.8
2018–19	Ulm	15	**11**	**24.0**	.519	**.413**	.850	1.8	**3.1**	.5	**.6**	**11.1**	**10.3**
2020–21	Bahçeşehir Koleji	9	2	20.2	.538	.410	1.000	1.1	2.1	**.7**	.1	10.8	8.9
Career		66	26	16.5	.497	.356	.851	1.3	1.6	.4	.3	6.6	5.0

== Personal life ==
Ismet is of Turkish descent. He is younger brother of the Turkish player Mutlu Akpınar.
