= Tigers Tübingen =

- Leagues: ProA
- Founded: 1952; 74 years ago
- History: SV 03 Tübingen (1952–2003); Tigers Tübingen (2003–present)
- Arena: Paul Horn-Arena
- Capacity: 3,132
- Location: Tübingen, Germany
- Main sponsor: Zeltwanger
- President: Robert Wintermantel
- Head coach: Henrik Sonko
- Team captain: Till-Joscha Jönke
- Website: tigers-tuebingen.de
Home	Away

Tigers Tübingen is a basketball team from Tübingen, a college town in central Baden-Württemberg, Germany, playing in the ProA, the country's second tier league. The team plays their home games at the Paul Horn-Arena, which has a capacity of 3,132 people.

Founded as SV 03 Tübingen, is affiliated with the multi-sports club SV 03 Tübingen, which was founded in 1903. In 1952, its basketball section was founded. In 2003, the name Walter Tigers Tübingen was chosen for the basketball team after the local Tübingen company Walter AG, a tool manufacturer, became the team's sponsor. The company ended their sponsorship in 2018.

== Academy ==
The Tübingen youth teams compete as Young Tigers Tübingen in the Oberliga (U19) and in the JBBL (U16). In 2010, under the leadership of then-coach Manuel Pasios, Tübingen made it into the NBBL for the first time. Previously, from 2006 to 2009, they played in the NBBL together with BBA Ludwigsburg as SG Ludwigsburg/Tübingen. Later, Kristiyan Borisov and Martin Ströbele took over the management of the NBBL team. In 2018, Pasios succeeded Claus Sieghörtner as coach of the regional league team. In 2022, the U19 team was relegated from the NBBL after twelve years in the league.

Tübingen has been playing in the JBBL since its foundation in 2009. Only in the 2010/11 season did the team fail to qualify.

== History ==
In 1992/93, SV 03 Tübingen became members of the Basketball Bundesliga for the first time, but didn't manage to escape relegation; a second one-season stint followed in 2001/02. After being promoted to the Basketball Bundesliga again in 2004 the name was changed to Walter Tigers Tübingen. In 14 consecutive seasons in the top flight they never succeeded in reaching the play-offs and were finally relegated to the ProA after finishing last in the 2017/18 season. In their first ProA season 2018/2019 the name was changed to Tigers Tübingen and they missed the playoffs by one spot finishing in the 9th place. The 2019/20 season was their second season in the ProA.

== Players ==
=== Current roster ===
Note: Flags indicate national team eligibility at FIBA-sanctioned events. Players may hold other non-FIBA nationalities not displayed.

Tigers Tübingen roster
Players
Coaches

Pos.	No.	Nat.	Name	Ht.	Age
PG	1	(Germany) (Bosnia and Herzegovina)	Bojanic, Kosta	1.82 m (6 ft 0 in)	18 – 17 September 2008
F	2	(United States)	Smith Jr., Tim	2.03 m (6 ft 8 in)	26 – 7 October 2000
PG	3	(Canada)	Warnholtz, Aiden	1.88 m (6 ft 2 in)	26 – 4 February 2000
SG	7	(Germany)	Kamp, Lars	1.90 m (6 ft 3 in)	30 – 26 March 1996
G	8	(Germany)	Schwanenberg, Neil	1.84 m (6 ft 0 in)	20 – 6 February 2006
C	9	(Germany) (Scotland)	Richardson, Alexander	2.06 m (6 ft 9 in)	23 – 9 September 2003
SF	10	(Dominican Republic) (Germany)	Santana Mojica, Nico	1.94 m (6 ft 4 in)	24 – 7 May 2002
G	11	(United States)	Haney, Isaac	1.86 m (6 ft 1 in)	24 – 5 August 2002
F	12	(Norway) (United States)	Sjolund, Kristian	2.03 m (6 ft 8 in)	27 – 10 September 1999
G/F	14	(Germany) (Nigeria)	Ani, Jesse	1.90 m (6 ft 3 in)	24 – 27 January 2002
C	17	(Germany)	Heberle, Aron	2.06 m (6 ft 9 in)	20 – 26 May 2006
G	20	(Germany)	Feneberg, Simon	1.90 m (6 ft 3 in)	21 – 20 February 2005
F	23	(Germany) (Ghana)	Moreaux, Melkisedek (injured)	1.98 m (6 ft 6 in)	29 – 23 July 1997
PF	24	(United States)	Morisch, Creighton	2.08 m (6 ft 10 in)	24 – 1 November 2002
PG	26	(Germany)	Jönke, Till-Joscha (C)	1.91 m (6 ft 3 in)	34 – 4 January 1992
F/C	34	(Germany) (Togo)	Kondo, Fabien	2.06 m (6 ft 9 in)	24 – 17 May 2002

Head coach

- (Spain) Félix Bañobre

Assistant coach(es)

- (Spain) Pablo Zapata

Legend

- (C) Team captain
- Injured

- Roster
Updated: October 20, 2026

=== Depth chart ===
Pos.	Starting 5	Bench 1	Bench 2	Inactive
C	Creighton Morisch	Aron Heberle	Alexander Richardson
PF	Tim Smith Jr.	Kristian Sjolund	Fabien Kondo
SF	Nico Santana Mojica	Jesse Ani	Till-Joscha Jönke	Melkisedek Moreaux (injured)
SG	Lars Kamp	Simon Feneberg	Neil Schwanenberg
PG	Isaac Haney	Aiden Warnholtz	Kosta Bojanic

=== Head coaches ===
Span	Coach
2004–2006	(United States) Pat Elzie
2006–2007	(United States) Aaron McCarthy
2008–2009	(Turkey) Tolga Öngören
2009–2015	(Germany) Igor Perović
2016–2017	(United States) Tyron McCoy
2017–2018	(Germany) Mathias Fischer
2018–2019	(Germany) Aleksandar Nadjfeji
2019	(Germany) Georg Kämpf
2019–2019	(United States) Doug Spradley
2020	(United States) Andy Hipsher
2020–2024	(Finland) Daniel Jansson
2024–2026	(Germany) Domenik Reinboth
2026–present	(Spain) Félix Bañobre

== Season by season ==
Season	Tier	League	Pos.	Cup
2000–01	2	2. BBL	1st	
2001–02	1	Bundesliga	15th	
2002–03	2	2. BBL	2nd	
2003–04	2	2. BBL	1st	
2004–05	1	Bundesliga	14th	
2005–06	1	Bundesliga	12th	
2006–07	1	Bundesliga	10th	
2007–08	1	Bundesliga	15th	
2008–09	1	Bundesliga	14th	
2009–10	1	Bundesliga	12th	
2010–11	1	Bundesliga	12th	
2011–12	1	Bundesliga	12th	
2012–13	1	Bundesliga	10th	
2013–14	1	Bundesliga	16th	
2014–15	1	Bundesliga	14th	
2015–16	1	Bundesliga	14th	
2016–17	1	Bundesliga	15th	
2017–18	1	Bundesliga	18th	
2018–19	2	ProA	9th	
2019–20	2	ProA	13th	
2020–21	2	ProA	13th	
2021–22	2	ProA	1st	
2022–23	2	ProA	2nd	
2023–24	1	Bundesliga	18th	First round
2024–25	2	ProA	7th	First round
2025–26	2	ProA	13th	First round

== Honours ==
2. Basketball Bundesliga

- Champions: 2001, 2004

== Notable players ==
- (Denmark) Bakary Dibba
- (Finland) Aatu Kivimäki
- (Greece) Georgios Kalaitzakis
- (United States) Augustine Rubit
