= Tolga Öngören =

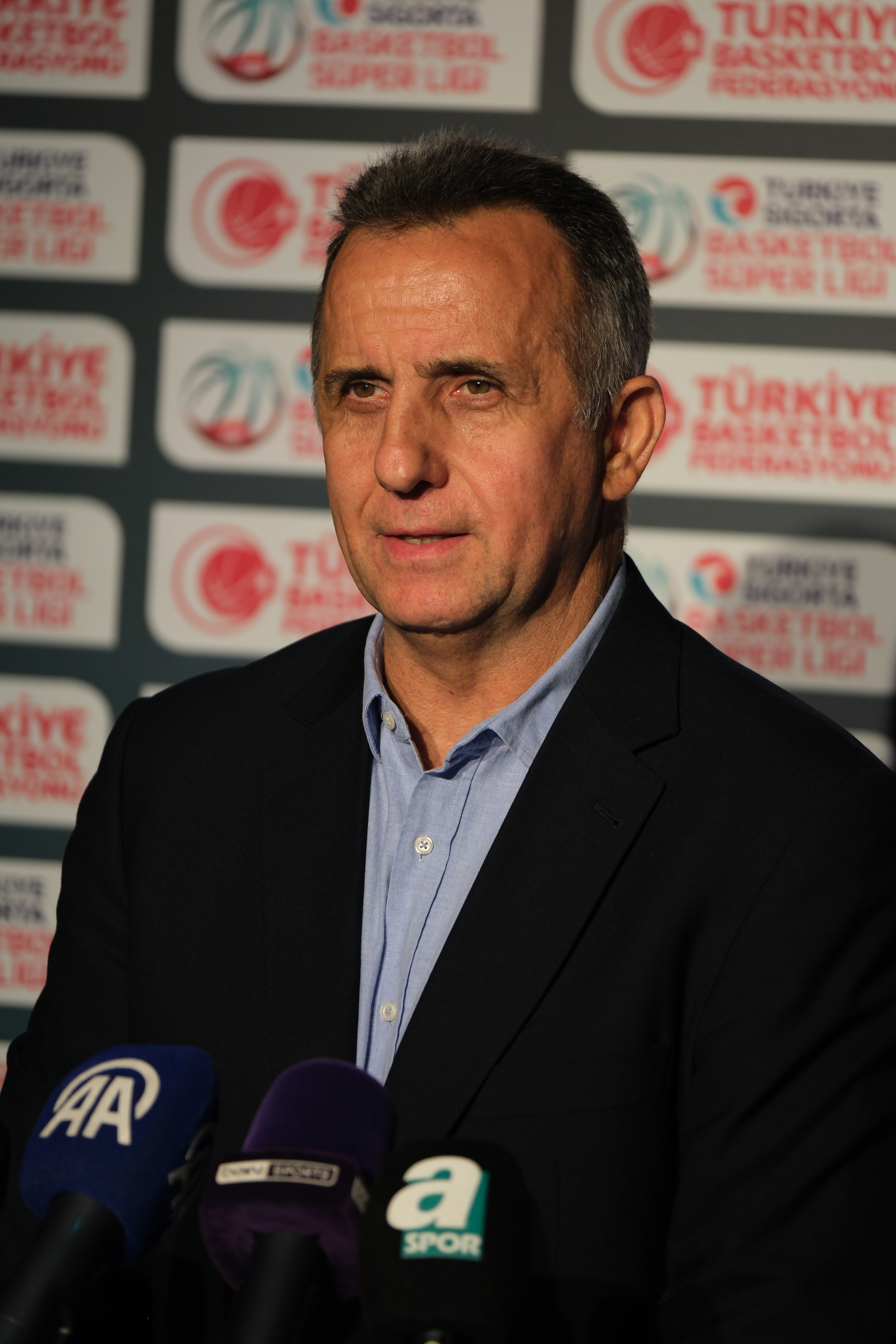

Tolga Mevlüt Öngören (born August 18, 1963) is a Turkish basketball coach who, in addition to coaching clubs in his home country, where he won one Turkish Championship and two Turkish Cups, has also coached clubs in the German Basketball Bundesliga.

== Career ==
As a player, Öngören spent a long time with Tofaş Spor Kulübü (Tofaş Bursa). After retiring as a player, he worked for a year as an assistant coach for the Purdue University Boilermakers in the National Collegiate Athletic Association (NCAA) in the United States. Upon his return, he became assistant to head coach Jasmin Repeša at Tofaş. In 1999, the team won the Turkish league title, the Turkish Cup, and the Turkish Presidential Cup. When Repeša unexpectedly resigned the following season, the inexperienced Öngören took over as head coach. The team at that time included players such as David Rivers, Slaven Rimac, Rashard Griffith, and the young, up-and-coming Mehmet Okur. The league and cup titles, won for the first time in the club's history in 1999, were successfully defended.

Öngören won another cup title as coach of Fenerbahçe Ülkerspor in the 2002/03 season, in which the league title was lost in the decisive seventh leg against defending champions and record holders Efes Pilsen Istanbul. In the following season, he resigned as coach of Ülker and briefly became coach of Türk Telekom in the capital, Ankara. In 2005, he returned to Tofaş and led the club back to the first division. However, with a defeat against Efes Pilsen on the final matchday of the 2006/07 season, they were relegated.

In January 2008, Öngören took over the relegation-threatened German Bundesliga club Walter Tigers Tübingen and secured their survival. Due to the club's financial difficulties, Öngören and Tübingen parted ways at the end of the following season. He became the new coach of the Bundesliga club EnBW Ludwigsburg. However, even with Öngören at the helm, the club again failed to qualify for the playoffs for the German championship. His contract was subsequently not renewed for the 2010/11 season. His successor in Ludwigsburg was Markus Jochum.

Öngören returned to his home country and became manager of Tofaş Bursa.
