= Rubén Domínguez (basketball) =

Spanish basketball player (born 2003)

Xavier Musketeers
- Position: Shooting guard
- Conference: Big East Conference

Personal information
- Born: 23 January 2003 (age 23) Puerto Real, Spain
- Listed height: 6 ft 6 in (1.98 m)
- Listed weight: 213 lb (97 kg)

Career information
- College: Texas A&M (2025–2026); Xavier (2026–present)
- Playing career: 2020–2025

Career history
- 2020–2023: Estudiantes
- 2023–2024: → TAU Castelló
- 2024–2025: Bilbao

Career highlights
- FIBA Europe Cup champion (2025); FIBA U16 European Championship MVP (2019)
Medals
Men's basketball
Representing Spain
FIBA U16 European Championship
Gold medal – first place	2019 Italy	Team
Silver medal – second place	2018 Serbia	Team

Rubén Domínguez González (born 23 January 2003) is a Spanish college basketball player for the Xavier Musketeers of the Big East Conference. He previously played for the Texas A&M Aggies.

== Early life and youth career ==
Domínguez grew up playing basketball for AD Las Canteras in his hometown of Puerto Real. In 2014, he joined the youth academy of Unicaja Málaga. He moved to Baloncesto Torrelodones at age 15.

In the 2019–20 season, Domínguez began playing for the reserve team of Estudiantes in the Liga EBA. On 8 November 2020, he made his Liga ACB debut with Estudiantes in a loss against FC Barcelona.

== College career ==
On June 6, 2025, Domínguez committed to play college basketball at Texas A&M.

== National team career ==
Domínguez won a silver medal with Spain at the 2018 FIBA U16 European Championship in Serbia, averaging 8.9 points. At the 2019 FIBA U16 European Championship in Italy, he was named most valuable player after averaging 13.4 points, 3.4 rebounds and 2.3 assists per game and leading Spain to a gold medal. Domínguez led his team to fifth place at the 2021 FIBA Under-19 World Cup in Latvia, averaging 18.7 points, 2.9 rebounds and 2.4 assists per game.
