= 2025–26 Penn State Nittany Lions basketball team =

American college basketball season

2025–26 Penn State Nittany Lions basketball
- Conference: Big Ten Conference
- Record: 12–20 (3–17 Big Ten)
- Head coach: Mike Rhoades (3rd season)
- Associate head coach: Jamal Brunt (3rd season)
- Assistant coaches: Brent Scott (3rd season); Talor Battle (2nd season); Joe Crispin (3rd season)
- Home arena: Bryce Jordan Center

2025–26 Big Ten Conference men's basketball standings
	Conf.				Overall
Team	W		L	PCT	W		L	PCT
No. 3 Michigan	19	–	1	.950	29	–	2	.935
No. 8 Michigan State	15	–	5	.750	25	–	6	.806
No. 11 Nebraska	15	–	5	.750	26	–	5	.839
No. 9 Illinois	15	–	5	.750	24	–	7	.774
No. 23 Wisconsin	14	–	6	.700	22	–	9	.710
UCLA	13	–	7	.650	21	–	10	.677
No. 18 Purdue	13	–	7	.650	23	–	8	.742
Ohio State	12	–	8	.600	20	–	11	.645
Iowa	10	–	10	.500	20	–	11	.645
Indiana	9	–	11	.450	18	–	13	.581
Minnesota	8	–	12	.400	15	–	16	.484
Washington	7	–	13	.350	15	–	16	.484
USC	7	–	13	.350	18	–	13	.581
Rutgers	6	–	14	.300	13	–	18	.419
Northwestern	5	–	15	.250	14	–	18	.438
Oregon	5	–	15	.250	12	–	20	.375
Maryland	4	–	16	.200	12	–	20	.375
Penn State	3	–	17	.150	12	–	20	.375
† 2026 Big Ten tournament winner As of March 10, 2026; Rankings from AP poll

The 2025–26 Penn State Nittany Lions basketball team represented Penn State University during the 2025–26 NCAA Division I men's basketball season. They were led by third-year head coach Mike Rhoades, and played their home games at Bryce Jordan Center located in State College, Pennsylvania as members of the Big Ten Conference. They finished the season 12–20, 3–17 in Big Ten play to finish in last place. They lost to Northwestern in the first round of the Big Ten tournament.

== Previous season ==
The Nittany Lions finished the 2024–25 season 16–15, 6–14 in Big Ten play to finish in 17th place. As a result of finishing in the bottom three, they failed to qualify for the Big Ten tournament.

== Offseason ==
=== Departures ===
Penn State departures
Name	Number	Pos.	Height	Weight	Year	Hometown	Reason for departure
Jahvin Carter	0	G	6'3"	175	Freshman	Alcoa, TN	Transferred to Middle Tennessee State
Ace Baldwin Jr.	1	G	6'1"	190	Graduate Student	Baltimore, MD	Graduated, signed with the Osceola Magic
D'Marco Dunn	2	G	6'5"	195	Senior	Tucson, AZ	Graduated
Nick Kern Jr.	3	G	6'6"	200	Senior	St. Louis, MO	Graduated
Puff Johnson	5	G/F	6'8"	205	Graduate Student	Moon Township, PA	Graduated
Miles Goodman	8	F	6'11"	205	Freshman	Seattle, WA	Transferred to UT Arlington
Joe Sedora	10	F	6'5"	185	Freshman	York, PA	Walk-on; Transferred to West Chester
Yanic Konan Niederhäuser	14	F	7'0"	225	Junior	Fräschels, Switzerland	Declared for the 2025 NBA draft; Selected 30th overall by Los Angeles Clippers
Kachi Nzeh	15	F	6'8"	230	Sophomore	Upper Darby, PA	Transferred to Little Rock
Zach Hicks	24	F	6'8"	200	Senior	Camden, NJ	Graduated
Hudson Ward	52	F	6'7"	210	Freshman	Leduc, AB, Canada	Transferred to Western Michigan

=== Incoming transfers ===
Penn State incoming transfers
Name	Number	Pos.	Height	Weight	Year	Hometown	Previous school
Josh Reed	10	F	6'8"	230	Senior	Atlanta, GA	Cincinnati
Saša Ciani	22	F	6'10"	240	Junior	Nova Gorica, Slovenia	UIC

=== Recruiting classes ===
==== 2025 recruiting class ====
College recruiting information
Name	Hometown	School	Height	Weight	Commit date
Kayden Mingo; CG	Farmingdale, New York	Long Island Lutheran High School	6 ft 1 in (1.85 m)	160 lb (73 kg)	Nov 1, 2024
Kayden Mingo; CG	Recruit ratings: Rivals: 247Sports: ESPN: (87)				
Mason Blackwood; SF	Rochester, New York	New Hampton School	6 ft 7 in (2.01 m)	210 lb (95 kg)	Sep 18, 2024
Mason Blackwood; SF	Recruit ratings: Rivals: 247Sports: ESPN: (81)				
Justin Houser; C	Camp Hill, Pennsylvania	The Phelps School	7 ft 0 in (2.13 m)	205 lb (93 kg)	Jun 27, 2024
Justin Houser; C	Recruit ratings: Rivals: 247Sports: ESPN: (77)				
Ivan Jurić; C	Zagreb, Croatia	Sunrise Christian Academy (Kansas)	7 ft 0 in (2.13 m)	250 lb (110 kg)	May 6, 2025
Ivan Jurić; C	Recruit ratings: Rivals: 247Sports: (NR)				
Reggie Grodin; SG	Larchmont, NY	The Newman School	6 ft 5 in (1.96 m)	200 lb (91 kg)	May 6, 2025
Reggie Grodin; SG	Recruit ratings: Rivals: 247Sports: (NR)				
Melih Tunca; SG	Istanbul, Turkey	FMV Ayazağa Işık High School	6 ft 5 in (1.96 m)	195 lb (88 kg)	Jun 2, 2025
Melih Tunca; SG	Recruit ratings: No ratings found				
Tibor Mirtič; PF	Ljubljana, Slovenia	Gimnazija Moste	6 ft 9 in (2.06 m)	225 lb (102 kg)	Jul 18, 2025
Tibor Mirtič; PF	Recruit ratings: No ratings found				
Overall recruit ranking: Rivals: 31 247Sports: 42 ESPN: —
Note: In many cases, Scout, Rivals, 247Sports, On3, and ESPN may conflict in their listings of height and weight.; In these cases, the average was taken. ESPN grades are on a 100-point scale.; Sources: "Penn State 2025 Basketball Commitments". Rivals.; "2025 Penn State Nittany Lions Recruiting Class". ESPN.; "2025 Team Ranking". Rivals.; "Penn State 2025 Basketball Commits". 247Sports.

== Roster ==
2025–26 Penn State Nittany Lions men's basketball team
Players
Coaches

Pos.	#	Name	Height	Weight	Year	Previous school	Hometown
F	1	Mason Blackwood	6 ft 7 in (2.01 m)	230 lb (104 kg)	Fr	New Hampton School	Rochester, NY
F	3	Ivan Jurić	7 ft 0 in (2.13 m)	250 lb (113 kg)	Fr	Sunrise Christian (Kans.)	Zagreb, Croatia
G	4	Kayden Mingo	6 ft 3 in (1.91 m)	195 lb (88 kg)	Fr	Long Island Lutheran HS	Farmingdale, NY
G	5	Freddie Dilione V	6 ft 5 in (1.96 m)	195 lb (88 kg)	RS Jr	Tennessee	Fayetteville, NC
G	7	Dominick Stewart	6 ft 5 in (1.96 m)	195 lb (88 kg)	So	SoCal Academy	Ocean Springs, MS
G	9	Melih Tunca	6 ft 5 in (1.96 m)	195 lb (88 kg)	Fr	FMV Ayazağa Işık HS	Istanbul, Turkey
F	10	Josh Reed	6 ft 8 in (2.03 m)	230 lb (104 kg)	Sr	Cincinnati	Atlanta, GA
G	11	Eli Rice	6 ft 8 in (2.03 m)	230 lb (104 kg)	RS So	Nebraska	Bradenton, FL
G	12	Reggie Grodin	6 ft 5 in (1.96 m)	200 lb (91 kg)	Fr	The Newman School	Larchmont, NY
F	16	Tibor Mirtič	6 ft 9 in (2.06 m)	225 lb (102 kg)	Fr	Gimnazija Moste	Ljubljana, Slovenia
F	21	Justin Houser	7 ft 0 in (2.13 m)	235 lb (107 kg)	Fr	The Phelps School	Camp Hill, PA
F	22	Saša Ciani	6 ft 10 in (2.08 m)	240 lb (109 kg)	Jr	UIC	Nova Gorica, Slovenia
F	30	Chris Lotito (w)	6 ft 5 in (1.96 m)	215 lb (98 kg)	Fr	Don Bosco Prep	Upper Saddle River, NJ

Head coach

- Mike Rhoades (Lebanon Valley)

Assistant coach(es)

- Jamal Brunt (Randolph–Macon)
- Brent Scott (Rice)
- Talor Battle (Penn State)
- Joe Crispin (Penn State)

Legend

- (C) Team captain
- (S) Suspended
- (I) Ineligible
- (W) Walk-on
- Injured
- Current redshirt

Roster

== Schedule and results ==
Date time, TV	Rank^{#}	Opponent^{#}	Result	Record	High points	High rebounds	High assists	Site (attendance) city, state
Exhibition
October 19, 2025; 2:00 p.m., FDSNO		at Dayton	L 62–78	–	16 – Tied	6 – Tied	4 – Mingo	UD Arena (13,407); Dayton, OH
October 26, 2025; 2:00 p.m., B1G+		Shippensburg	W 86–67	–	21 – Dilione V	9 – Jurić	7 – Mingo	Bryce Jordan Center (1,086); State College, PA
Regular season
November 3, 2025*; 7:00 p.m., B1G+		Fairfield	W 76–68	1–0	19 – Tunca	11 – Mirtic	6 – Tunca	Bryce Jordan Center (5,547); State College, PA
November 8, 2025*; 1:00 p.m., NEC Front Row		at New Haven	W 87–43	2–0	18 – Stewart	7 – Dilione V	6 – Mingo	Hazell Center (1,087); West Haven, CT
November 11, 2025*; 6:30 p.m., BTN		Navy; Military Appreciation Game	W 80–71	3–0	19 – Dilione V	7 – Mingo	4 – Mingo	Bryce Jordan Center (5,772); State College, PA
November 15, 2025*; 1:00 p.m., Peacock		vs. La Salle; Basketball on Broad: Autumn Invitational	W 83–69	4–0	20 – Tunca	6 – Jurić	7 – Mingo	Xfinity Mobile Arena; Philadelphia, PA
November 19, 2025*; 6:30 p.m., B1G+		Harvard; Fight for Literacy Game	W 84–80	5–0	24 – Mingo	9 – Jurić	6 – Tunca	Bryce Jordan Center (5,708); State College, PA
November 22, 2025*; 4:00 p.m., TruTV		vs. Providence; Hall of Fame Showcase	L 65–77	5–1	22 – Dilione V	9 – Dilione V	4 – Dilione V	Mohegan Sun Arena (6,456); Uncasville, CT
November 25, 2025*; 7:00 p.m., Peacock/NBCSN		Boston University	W 96–87	6–1	17 – Reed	8 – Reed	4 – Tied	Bryce Jordan Center (4,424); State College, PA
November 29, 2025*; 6:00 p.m., Peacock/NBCSN		Sacred Heart	W 90–59	7–1	14 – Jurić	9 – Jurić	5 – Mingo	Bryce Jordan Center (4,703); State College, PA
December 2, 2025*; 6:00 p.m., BTN		Campbell	W 87–76	8–1	21 – Mingo	4 – Tied	5 – Stewart	Bryce Jordan Center (6,139); State College, PA
December 9, 2025; 8:30 p.m., FS1		at Indiana	L 72–113	8–2 (0–1)	19 – Mingo	3 – Tied	2 – Tied	Simon Skjodt Assembly Hall (17,222); Bloomington, IN
December 13, 2025; 12:00 p.m., BTN		No. 9 Michigan State; Student T-Shirt Giveaway & Schuylkill County Day	L 72–76	8–3 (0–2)	23 – Dilione V	7 – Mingo	8 – Mingo	Bryce Jordan Center (7,091); State College, PA
December 21, 2025*; 12:00 p.m., BTN		vs. Pittsburgh	L 46–80	8–4	23 – Dilione V	6 – Tied	5 – Mingo	GIANT Center (8,191); Hershey, PA
December 29, 2025*; 1:00 p.m., BTN		North Carolina Central	W 90–67	9–4	19 – Mingo	5 – Ciani	5 – Tied	Bryce Jordan Center (5,285); State College, PA
January 3, 2026; 7:00 p.m., BTN		vs. No. 20 Illinois; White Out	L 65–73	9–5 (0–3)	16 – Mingo	4 – Tied	5 – Mingo	Palestra (4,686); Philadelphia, PA
January 6, 2026; 7:00 p.m., FS1		No. 2 Michigan; Bryce Jordan Center 30th Anniversary Celebration	L 72–74	9–6 (0–4)	20 – Jurić	10 – Reed	4 – Dilione V	Bryce Jordan Center (5,491); State College, PA
January 10, 2026; 2:00 p.m., BTN		at No. 5 Purdue	L 85–93	9–7 (0–5)	25 – Dilione V	10 – Jurić	5 – Dilione V	Mackey Arena (14,876); West Lafayette, IN
January 14, 2026; 8:30 p.m., FS1		UCLA	L 60–71	9–8 (0–6)	16 – Stewart	9 – Jurić	3 – Tied	Bryce Jordan Center (5,836); State College, PA
January 18, 2026; 12:00 p.m., BTN		at Maryland	L 73–96	9–9 (0–7)	19 – Mingo	4 – Stewart	5 – Mingo	Xfinity Center (11,567); College Park, MD
January 22, 2026; 7:00 p.m., FS1		Wisconsin; Return to Rec	L 71–98	9–10 (0–8)	18 – Reed	12 – Jurić	5 – Mingo	Rec Hall (5,774); University Park, PA
January 26, 2026; 7:00 p.m., FS1		at Ohio State	L 78–84	9–11 (0–9)	20 – Rice	14 – Juri	8 – Mingo	Value City Arena (10,358); Columbus, OH
January 29, 2026; 8:00 p.m., Peacock		at Northwestern	L 73–94	9–12 (0–10)	15 – Mingo	6 – Jurić	5 – Tunca	Welsh-Ryan Arena (5,143); Evanston, IL
February 1, 2026; 2:00 p.m., Peacock/NBCSN		Minnesota; Coaches vs. Cancer Game & Alumni Day	W 77–75	10–12 (1–10)	25 – Dilione V	5 – Tied	4 – Mingo	Bryce Jordan Center (6,820); State College, PA
February 5, 2026; 6:30 p.m., FS1		at No. 2 Michigan	L 69–110	10–13 (1–11)	19 – Dillone V	7 – Dilione V	3 – Tied	Crisler Center (12,707); Ann Arbor, MI
February 8, 2026; 12:00 p.m., BTN		USC; THON Game	L 75–77	10–14 (1–12)	23 – Dilione V	8 – Jurić	4 – Dilione V	Bryce Jordan Center (6,504); State College, PA
February 11, 2026; 10:30 p.m., BTN		at Washington	W 63–60	11–14 (2–12)	16 – Dillone V	6 – Tied	3 – Mingo	Alaska Airlines Arena (7,306); Seattle, WA
February 14, 2026; 3:00 p.m., BTN		at Oregon	L 72–83	11–15 (2–13)	24 – Mingo	5 – Jurić	2 – Tied	Matthew Knight Arena (6,102); Eugene, OR
February 18, 2026; 6:00 p.m., BTN		Rutgers; Academic Achievement Night & Faculty and Staff Appreciation Night	L 72–85	11–16 (2–14)	22 – Reed	6 – Reed	6 – Mingo	Bryce Jordan Center (6,230); State College, PA
February 21, 2026; 2:00 p.m., BTN		at No. 9 Nebraska	L 64–87	11–17 (2–15)	13 – Tied	10 – Jurić	6 – Mingo	Pinnacle Bank Arena (15,128); Lincoln, NE
February 28, 2026; 12:00 p.m., BTN		Iowa; Autism Awareness Game	W 71–69	12–17 (3–15)	25 – Reed	8 – Jurić	4 – Reed	Bryce Jordan Center (6,922); State College, PA
March 4, 2026; 7:30 p.m., Peacock		Ohio State; Senior Night Presented by the Penn State Alumni Association	L 62–94	12–18 (3–16)	15 – Tied	3 – Blackwood	4 – Stewart	Bryce Jordan Center (6,137); State College, PA
March 7, 2026; 12:00 p.m., BTN		at Rutgers	L 62–74	12–19 (3–17)	16 – Jurić	8 – Reed	5 – Stewart	Jersey Mike's Arena (8,000); Piscataway, NJ
Big Ten Tournament
March 10, 2026; 7:30 p.m., Peacock/NBCSN	(18)	vs. (15) Northwestern; First round	L 66–76	12–20	22 – Jurić	6 – Jurić	5 – Mingo	United Center (15,828); Chicago, IL
*Non-conference game. ^{#}Rankings from AP Poll. (#) Tournament seedings in parentheses. All times are in Eastern Time.
