= Lefteris Mantzoukas =

Greek basketball player

No. 72 – Panathinaikos
- Position: Power forward / small forward
- League: Greek Basketball League; EuroLeague

Personal information
- Born: 8 July 2003 (age 23) Ioannina, Greece
- Listed height: 2.07 m (6 ft 9 in)
- Listed weight: 100 kg (220 lb)

Career information
- College: Oklahoma State (2025–2026)
- Playing career: 2017–present

Career history
- 2017–2021: Promitheas Patras
- 2021–present: Panathinaikos
- 2024: →Aris Thessaloniki
- 2024–2025: →Maroussi

Career highlights
- EuroLeague champion (2024); 2× Greek League champion (2021, 2024); Greek Cup winner (2021); 2× Greek Super Cup winner (2020, 2021); Greek League Most Improved Player (2023); Greek League Best Young Player (2023); Greek Youth All Star Game Slam Dunk Champion (2020)
Medals
Men's basketball
Representing Greece
European U-20 Championship
Bronze medal – third place	2023 Greece	Under-20

Eleftherios "Lefteris" Mantzoukas (alternate spelling: Madzoukas) (Greek: Ελευθέριος "Λευτέρης" Μαντζούκας; born 8 July 2003) is a Greek professional basketball player for Panathinaikos BC of the Greek Basketball League (GBL) and the EuroLeague.

== Professional career ==
On 14 February 2018, at the age of 14, Mantzoukas began his pro career with Promitheas Patras, in the Greek Basket League, during the 2017–18 season. He made his Greek League debut in a game versus Panionios, in which he scored 2 points, in 1 minute of playing time. Mantzoukas thus became the second youngest player to ever debut in the top-tier level Greek League, since it became fully professional in 1992. Georgios Papagiannis is the only other player to have previously debuted in the same competition, at a younger age.

Three months later, on 24 May 2017, while still at the age of 13, Mantzoukas became the youngest player to ever start a game in the top-tier level Greek League, since it became fully professional in 1992. He accomplished that when he started a Greek League game against Olympiacos, in which he scored 12 points, in 31 minutes of playing time. During the 2017–18 Greek League season, he averaged 2.9 points, 1.3 rebounds, and 0.6 assists per game, in 7 games played.

On 10 October 2018, at the age of 15, Mantzoukas debuted in one of the two European-wide secondary level competitions, the FIBA Champions League, during the 2018–19 season. He made his FIBA Champions League debut in a game versus the Belgian League club Oostende, in which he went scoreless, in 1 minute of playing time. During the 2018–19 FIBA Champions League season, he averaged 3.5 points and 0.5 rebounds per game, in 2 games played. He also averaged 1.5 points, 1.0 rebounds, and 0.8 assists per game, in 4 games played, during the 2018–19 Greek League season.

On 2 October 2019, at the age of 16, Mantzoukas debuted in another European-wide secondary level competition, the EuroCup, during the 2019–20 season. He made his EuroCup debut in a game versus the Israeli Super League club Maccabi Rishon LeZion, in which he scored 2 points.

On 18 December 2020, Promitheas announced that Mantzoukas would be moving to EuroLeague mainstays Panathinaikos on a five-year contract.

During the 2022–2023 campaign, in 29 domestic league matches, Mantzoukas averaged 5.5 points and 2.4 rebounds (shooting with 41% from the 3-point line) in 18 minutes per contest.

On 28 June 2024, Mantzoukas was loaned to Aris Thessaloniki for the 2024–2025 campaign. On 14 October of the same year, his loan agreement was terminated at the request of his Aris head coach Ioannis Kastritis. On 17 October, Mantzoukas was loaned to Maroussi by Panathinaikos.

== National team career ==
Mantzoukas has been a member of the junior national teams of Greece. He played at the 2018 FIBA Under-16 European Championship, where he averaged 9.3 points, 4.8 rebounds, and 1.4 assists per game. He also played at the 2019 FIBA Under-16 European Championship, where he averaged 15.0 points, 9.1 rebounds, and 2.7 assists per game.

== Career statistics ==
Legend
GP	Games played	GS	Games started	MPG	Minutes per game
FG%	Field-goal percentage	3P%	3-point field-goal percentage	FT%	Free-throw percentage
RPG	Rebounds per game	APG	Assists per game	SPG	Steals per game
BPG	Blocks per game	PPG	Points per game	PIR	Performance index rating
**Bold**	Career high

=== EuroLeague ===
†	Denotes seasons in which Mantzoukas won the EuroLeague

Year	Team	GP	GS	MPG	FG%	3P%	FT%	RPG	APG	SPG	BPG	PPG	PIR
2021–22	Panathinaikos	18	**1**	9.3	.481	.368	.333	1.0	.2	**.1**	**.1**	1.9	0.4
2022–23	Panathinaikos	**21**	0	**12.6**	.480	.419	**.800**	**1.7**	**.4**	**.1**	**.1**	**3.1**	**1.6**
2023–24†	Panathinaikos	14	0	7.3	**.563**	**.667**	.333	1.0	.1	**.1**	—	1.9	**1.6**
Career		53	1	10.1	.495	.452	.545	1.3	.3	.1	.1	2.4	1.2

=== EuroCup ===
Year	Team	GP	GS	MPG	FG%	3P%	FT%	RPG	APG	SPG	BPG	PPG	PIR
2019–20	Promitheas Patras	6	**1**	10.7	.412	.200	**.333**	1.2	.5	**.5**	—	2.8	1.8
2020–21	Promitheas Patras	**7**	**1**	**15.3**	**.633**	**.600**	—	**2.0**	**.6**	.3	**.1**	**6.7**	**7.1**
Career		13	2	13.2	.553	.440	.333	1.6	.5	.4	.1	4.9	4.7

=== Basketball Champions League ===
Year	Team	GP	GS	MPG	FG%	3P%	FT%	RPG	APG	SPG	BPG	PPG
2018–19	Promitheas Patras	2	1	14.4	.600	.500	—	.5	—	—	—	3.5
Career		2	1	14.4	.600	.500	—	.5	—	—	—	3.5

=== Domestic leagues ===
Year	Team	League	GP	MPG	FG%	3P%	FT%	RPG	APG	SPG	BPG	PPG
2017–18	(Greece) Promitheas Patras	GBL	7	11.6	.500	.444	1.000	1.3	.6	.1	—	2.9
2018–19	(Greece) Promitheas Patras	GBL	4	10.8	.200	.333	.500	1.0	.7	.7	—	1.5
2019–20	(Greece) Promitheas Patras	GBL	14	12.4	.436	.353	.667	1.5	.4	.2	—	3.1
2020–21	(Greece) Promitheas Patras	GBL	2	9.7	.250	.250	—	1.5	.5	.5	—	1.5
2020–21	(Greece) Panathinaikos	GBL	3	8.9	.250	.167	—	.7	1.7	.3	.3	1.7
2021–22	(Greece) Panathinaikos	GBL	22	8.8	.460	.276	.571	1.3	.7	.1	.0	2.6
2022–23	(Greece) Panathinaikos	GBL	29	17.8	.487	.410	.647	2.4	.6	.5	.1	5.5
2023–24	(Greece) Panathinaikos	GBL	20	11.5	.453	.414	.625	1.9	.5	.3	.1	3.7
