= Félix Bañobre =

Spanish basketball coach and former player

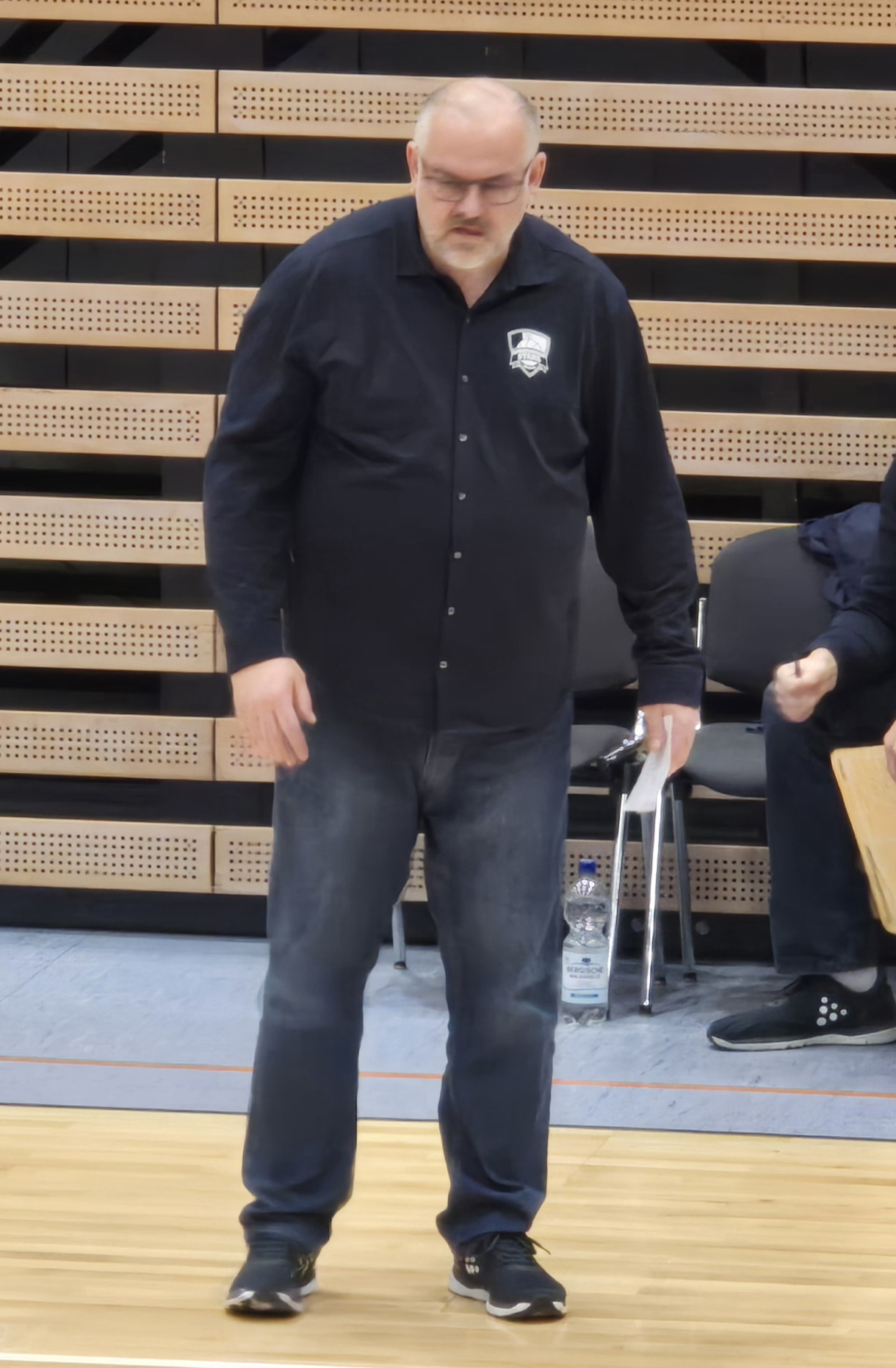
- Bañobre with Bochum in 2025

Tigers Tübingen
- Title: Head coach
- League: ProA

Personal information
- Born: 5 July 1970 (age 56) London, England

Career information
- Position: Swingman
- Coaching career: 1989–present

Career history

Coaching
- 2016–2019: SC Rist Wedel
- 2019–2026: VfL AstroStars Bochum
- 2026–present: Tigers Tübingen

Félix Bañobre Carballo (born 5 July 1970) is a Spanish basketball coach and former player. He currently serves as head coach of the Tigers Tübingen. He also holds British citizenship.

== Early life ==
Even though Bañobre was born in London, his home town is A Coruña. Bañobre returned to his home country at the age of 15. Because of his height, he was approached by a scout from first division club CB OAR Ferrol.

== Playing career ==
Bañobre played as Swingman. In 2016, he recalled that as a player, he had been a good shooter who once scored 56 points in a game.

== Coaching career ==
Bañobre started coaching children and young people during his playing career. He also coached the professionals at his first station and a second division club.

Later, he wanted to get out of Spain and was active in Denmark, coaching Team FOG Næstved in the first half of the 2013-14 season. Then, he managed the German regional league club BC Erfurt in 2015-16. In 2016, Bañobre already had 27 years of experience in the coaching sector.

In August 2016, he moved from BC Erfurt to SC Rist Wedel, cooperation partner of Hamburg Towers. In 2017-18, Bañobre simultaneously coached two teams (SC Rist Wedel in the ProB league and Hamburg's Under-19-side). He later left Wedel and joined Bochum for the 2019-20 season.

In his first year, he and the team qualified for the ProB playoffs. In the following season, Bochum was promoted to the 2nd Bundesliga ProA. In their first year in ProA, they managed to stay in the league. In the 2022-23 season, the team barely missed the ProA play-offs, finishing the regular season in ninth place. In late April 2023, he extended his contract there until 2026. In 2024, Bañobre's Bochum side suffered relegation from the ProA, but remained in the league, because no teams were promoted from the ProB. In the 2024-25 season, Bañobre led Bochum to its first ProA playoff appearance in team history. They fell to regular season champions Jena (0-3) in the opening round (quarter finals).

In April 2026, he was appointed as head coach of German ProA squad Tigers Tübingen.

== Coaching style ==
In mid-2016, Bañobre stated that he follows the “Spanish style of basketball,” meaning much freedom for the players while taking away pressure from them.

== Personal ==
He plays chess in his free time, collects exclusive wristwatches.
