= Pasian di Prato =

Pasian di Prato Pasiàn di Prât (Friulian)
- Comune
- Comune di Pasian di Prato
- Coat of arms

- Location within Italy Location within Friuli-Venezia Giulia
- Coordinates: 46°3′N 13°12′E
- Country: Italy
- Region: Friuli-Venezia Giulia
- Province: Udine (UD)
- Frazioni: Pasian di Prato, Colloredo di Prato, Passons, più le località di Santa Caterina e Bonavilla

Government
  - Mayor: Andrea Pozzo

Area
  - Total: 15.9 km^{2} (6.1 sq mi)
- Elevation: 106 m (348 ft)

Population (28 February 2017)
  - Total: 9,371
  - Density: 589/km^{2} (1,530/sq mi)
- Demonym: Pasianesi
- Time zone: UTC+1 (CET)
  - Summer (DST): UTC+2 (CEST)
- Postal code: 33037
- Dialing code: 0432
- Website: Official website

Pasian di Prato (Friulian: Pasiàn di Prât) is a comune (municipality) in the Regional decentralization entity of Udine in the Italian region of Friuli-Venezia Giulia, located about 70 kilometres (43 mi) northwest of Trieste and about 3 kilometres (2 mi) southwest of Udine.

Pasian di Prato borders the following municipalities: Basiliano, Campoformido, Martignacco, Tavagnacco and Udine (whose metropolitan area it belongs to).
