= SC Rist Wedel =

- Nickname: SCR
- Conference: North
- Leagues: ProB
- Founded: 1968; 58 years ago
- Arena: Steinberghalle
- Capacity: 600
- Location: Wedel, Germany
- General manager: Christoph Roquette
- Affiliation: Hamburg Towers
- Website: scrist.de
Home	Away

Sportclub Rist Wedel e.V., more commonly known as Rist Wedel, is a German basketball club based in Wedel. The men's team currently plays in the ProB, the third-tier in Germany. The home arena of the team is the Steinberghalle. Wedel's women team plays in the 2. Damen-Basketball-Bundesliga. The club's sports director is Christoph Roquette.

== Honours ==
ProB

- Runners-up (1): 2014–15

== Season by season ==
Season	Tier	Division	Pos.	W–L
2014–15	3	ProB	2nd (Note: Resigned to promote to the ProA.)	21–11
2015–16	3	ProB	20th	7–15
2016–17	3	ProB	15th	10–14
2017–18	3	ProB	17th	12–15

== Players ==
- (Germany) Darren Egbe PG #44
- (Germany) Nelson Martin G #10
- (Germany) Jayden Fatnassi SG #12
- (Germany) Danny Egbe SF #22
- (Germany) Paul Mellentin PF #35
- (Germany) Johan Meinberg C #33

=== Notable players ===
Note: Flags indicate national team eligibility at FIBA-sanctioned events. Players may hold other non-FIBA nationalities not displayed.

Criteria

To appear in this section a player must have either:

- Set a club record or won an individual award while at the club
- Played at least one official international match for their national team at any time
- Played at least one official NBA match at any time.

- (Germany) İsmet Akpınar
- (Germany) Louis Olinde

== Head coaches ==
- (Spain) Félix Bañobre (2016–2019)

== Player development ==
Wedel has been a cooperation partner of Bundesliga team Hamburg Towers.
