= Saša Ciani =

Slovenian basketball player (born 2003)

No. 22 – Sacramento State Hornets
- Position: Power forward
- League: Big West Conference

Personal information
- Born: 25 March 2003 (age 23) Šempeter pri Gorici, Slovenia
- Listed height: 2.06 m (6 ft 9 in)
- Listed weight: 109 kg (240 lb)

Career information
- College: Xavier (2023–2024); UIC (2024–2025); Penn State (2025–2026); Sacramento State (2026–present)
- Playing career: 2019–present

Career history
- 2019–2020: Koper Primorska
- 2020–2021: Dynamic VIP PAY
- 2021–2023: Cedevita Olimpija
- 2021–2022: →Nutrisport Ilirija
- 2022–2023: →Cedevita Junior

Career highlights
- Slovenian Cup winner (2020); All-Junior ABA League Team (2022)

Saša Ciani (born 25 March 2003) is a Slovenian basketball player who plays for the Sacrament State Hornets. He is a 2.05 m tall power forward.

== Professional career ==
Ciani started playing professional basketball for Koper Primorska. On 12 October 2020, Ciani signed with the Serbian team Dynamic VIP PAY and played in 21 games in the Serbian national championship. He previously played in the 2019–20 Slovenian national under-19 championship.

On 18 August 2021, Ciani signed a four-year contract with Cedevita Olimpija. A year later, in August 2022, Ciani was loaned to Cedevita Junior.

== College career ==
In September 2023, Ciani moved to the United States and committed to playing college basketball for the Xavier Musketeers of Xavier University for the 2023–24 season. After the season, he entered the NCAA transfer portal.

On April 23, 2024, Ciani transferred to play for the UIC Flames.

Following the season, Ciani re-entered the transfer portal. On June 28, 2025, Ciani transferred to play for the Penn State Nittany Lions.

On July 10, 2026, Ciani transferred to play for Sacramento State Hornets.

== National team career ==
Ciani made his debut for the Slovenia national team in August 2022 in a friendly match against the Netherlands, and was also included in the preliminary roster for EuroBasket 2022.

== College statistics ==
Year	Team	GP	GS	MPG	FG%	3P%	FT%	RPG	APG	SPG	BPG	PPG
2023–24	Xavier	31	5	13.2	.485	–	.524	2.9	.8	.3	.3	2.5
2024–25	UIC	27	21	20.2	.533	.308	.531	7.6	1.3	.6	.5	9.9
2025–26	Penn State	28	4	10.0	.389	.200	.682	1.9	.2	.1	.2	2.1
Career		86	30	14.3	.498	.278	.554	4.1	.8	.3	.3	4.7
