= Alexander Richardson (basketball) =

German basketball player (born 2003)

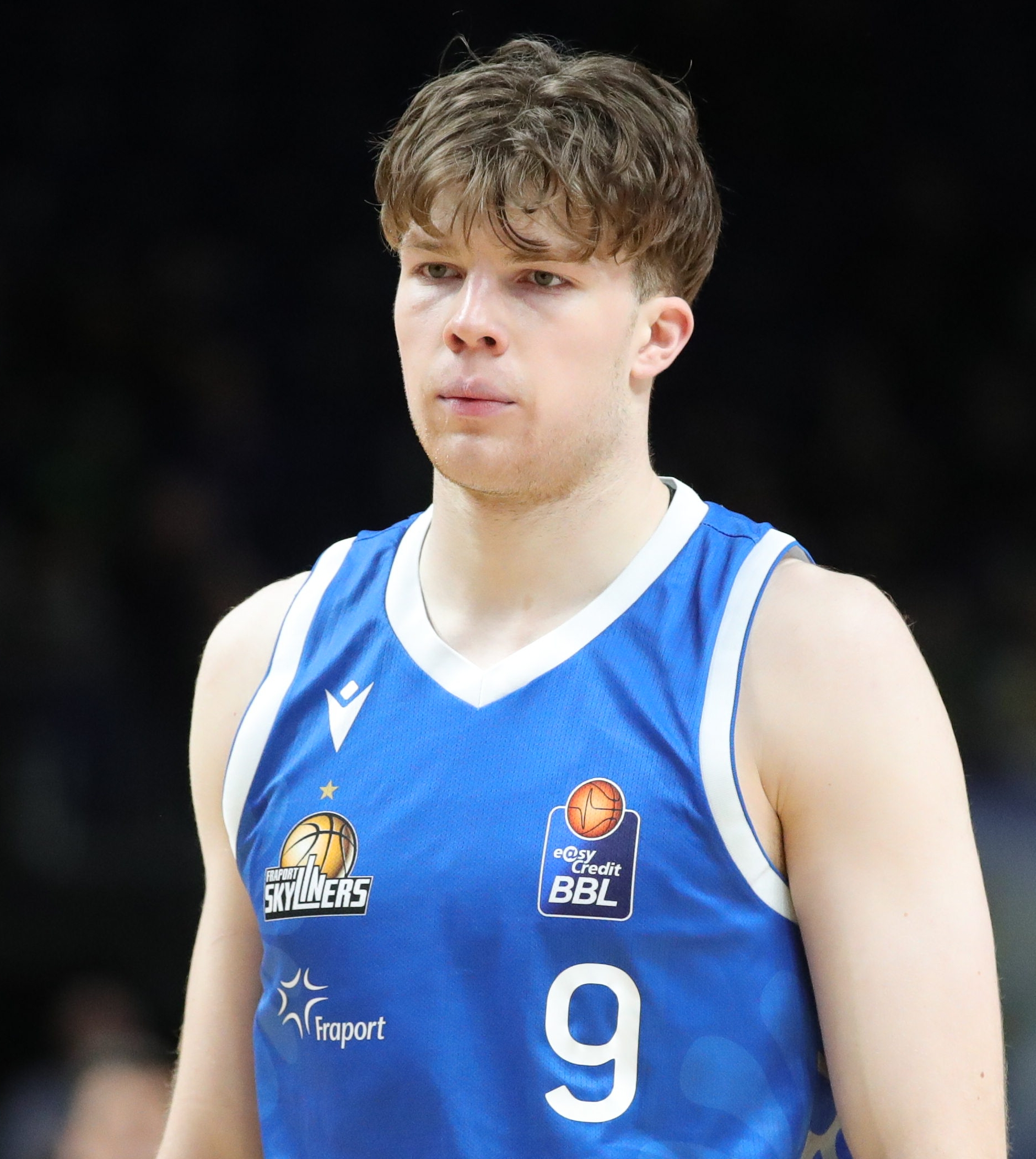
- Richardson with Frankfurt in 2023

No. 9 – Tigers Tübingen
- Position: Center
- League: ProA

Personal information
- Born: September 9, 2003 (age 23) Glasgow, Scotland
- Listed height: 6 ft 9 in (2.06 m)
- Listed weight: 237 lb (108 kg)

Career information
- College: Loyola University (2025–2026)

Career history
- 2018–2019: SSC Karlsruhe
- 2019: USC Heidelberg
- 2020–2023: Skyliners Frankfurt
- 2023–2025: ART Giants Düsseldorf
- 2026: Niners Chemnitz
- 2026–present: Tigers Tübingen

Career highlights
- ProA U22 Leader in Points, Rebounds and Efficiency (2024–25)

Alexander Richardson (born September 9, 2003) is a Scottish-German professional basketball player for the Tigers Tübingen of the German ProA. A versatile center, Richardson was one of the top young talents in German basketball.

== Professional career ==
Richardson began his basketball career playing for SSC Karlsruhe and USC Heidelberg before joining the youth academy of the Skyliners Frankfurt in 2020. He made his Basketball Bundesliga (BBL) debut on September 26, 2021, scoring nine points in just eight minutes during a game against Alba Berlin. He signed a professional contract with the Skyliners in the same year and played with the team until 2023.

In the summer of 2023, Richardson joined SG ART Giants Düsseldorf in the ProA where he became a standout player, leading all U22 players in the league in minutes, rebounds, and efficiency during the 2024-25 season. At the end of the season, he accepted an offer from Loyola University Chicago to play college basketball.

On June 17, 2026, he signed with Niners Chemnitz of the Basketball Bundesliga (BBL).

On October 19, 2026, he signed with Tigers Tübingen of the German ProA.

== National team career ==
Richardson represented Germany at the 2019 FIBA Europe Under-16 Championship. In 2023, he also played for Germany at the FIBA Europe Under-20 Championship.
