= Eurocup Basketball 2011–12 Last 16 Group J =

Standings and Results for Group J of the Last 16 phase of the 2011–12 Eurocup basketball tournament.

== Standings ==
Key to colors
Top two places in each group advance to the Quarterfinals

	Team	Pld	W	L	PF	PA	Diff	Tie-break
1.	(Ukraine) Donetsk	6	5	1	477	437	+40	1–1 (+5)
2.	(Russia) Khimki	6	5	1	465	419	+46	1–1 (–5)
3.	(France) ASVEL	6	1	5	460	477	–17	1–1 (+10)
4.	(Greece) Aris	6	1	5	389	458	–69	1–1 (–10)

== Fixtures and results ==
All times given below are in Central European Time.

=== Game 1 ===
19 January 2012
18:45

Report

Aris (Greece)	48–73	(Russia) Khimki
Scoring by quarter: 4–16, 26–15, 10–22, 8–20
Pts: James, Verginis 11; Rebs: Kerusch 9 Asts: Four players 1		Pts: Fridzon 14; Rebs: Monia 8 Asts: Quinn, Planinić 5

Alexandreio Melathron, Thessaloniki
Attendance: 4,628
Referees: Guerrino Cerebuch (ITA), Sasa Maricic (SRB), Miguel Angel Perez Niz (ESP)

19 January 2012
20:00

Report

ASVEL (France)	75–86	(Ukraine) Donetsk
Scoring by quarter: 20–19, 21–24, 16–22, 18–21
Pts: Armstrong 21; Rebs: Lacombe 6 Asts: Goss 5		Pts: Curry 18; Rebs: Four players 5 Asts: Avdalović, Curry 6

Astroballe, Villeurbanne
Attendance: 3,225
Referees: Vicente Bulto (ESP), Panagiotis Anastopoulos (GRE), Apostolos Kalpakas (SWE)

=== Game 2 ===
24 January 2012
18:00

Report

Donetsk (Ukraine)	81–74	(Greece) Aris
Scoring by quarter: 24–11, 16–23, 20–19, 21–21
Pts: Curry 18; Rebs: Lee, Jackson 6 Asts: Curry 5		Pts: Davis 22; Rebs: Muldrow 8 Asts: Mavraides 3

Druzhba Palace of Sports, Donetsk
Attendance: 3,271
Referees: Sasa Pukl (SLO), Andrej Jersan (SLO), Oskars Lucis (LAT)

24 January 2012
19:00

Report

Khimki (Russia)	86–80	(France) ASVEL
Scoring by quarter: 25–15, 16–15, 23–22, 22–28
Pts: Kelati 18; Rebs: Monia, Kelati 5 Asts: Planinić 7		Pts: Jackson 18; Rebs: Tillie 7 Asts: Thompson 3

Basketball Center of Moscow Region, Khimki
Attendance: 2,150
Referees: Matej Boltauzer (SLO), Marko Juras (SRB), Arnis Ozols (LAT)

=== Game 3 ===
31 January 2012
16:00

Report

Khimki (Russia)	68–55	(Ukraine) Donetsk
Scoring by quarter: 17–11, 19–21, 18–12, 14–11
Pts: Fridzon 17; Rebs: Lončar, Fridzon 7 Asts: Kelati 3		Pts: Kravtsov 17; Rebs: Radenović 10; Asts: Avdalović 3

Basketball Center of Moscow Region, Khimki
Attendance: 2,015
Referees: Paolo Taurino (ITA), Elias Koromilas (GRE), Tomas Trawicki (POL)

31 January 2012
18:45

Report

Aris (Greece)	77–60	(France) ASVEL
Scoring by quarter: 22–14, 13–20, 21–14, 21–12
Pts: Davis 19; Rebs: Muldrow 11; Asts: Davis, Verginis 2		Pts: Tillie 17; Rebs: Armstrong 11; Asts: Thompson 5

Alexandreio Melathron, Thessaloniki
Attendance: 2,482
Referees: Juan Carlos Garcia Gonzalez (ESP), Sinisa Herceg (CRO), Boris Shulga (UKR)

=== Game 4 ===
7 February 2012
18:00

Report

Donetsk (Ukraine)	85–67	(Russia) Khimki
Scoring by quarter: 19–18, 24–17, 16–17, 26–15
Pts: Curry, Avdalović 18; Rebs: Jackson 9 Asts: Avdalović 4		Pts: Vyaltsev 19; Rebs: Nielsen 4 Asts: Planinić 6

Druzhba Palace of Sports, Donetsk
Attendance: 4,095
Referees: Dubravko Muhvic (CRO), Seffi Shemmesh (ISR), Jurgis Laurinavicius (LTU)

7 February 2012
20:00

Report

ASVEL (France)	79–52	(Greece) Aris
Scoring by quarter: 23–9, 16–9, 16–22, 24–12
Pts: Armstrong 18; Rebs: Armstrong 8 Asts: Westermann 6		Pts: Kerusch 9 Rebs: Kerusch 7 Asts: Davis 2

Astroballe, Villeurbanne
Attendance: 3,800
Referees: Zoran Sutulovic (MNE), Luis Lopes (POR), Oscar Perea (ESP)

=== Game 5 ===
21 February 2012
16:00

Report

Khimki (Russia)	88–72	(Greece) Aris
Scoring by quarter: 22–22, 26–16, 22–16, 18–18
Pts: Lončar 14; Rebs: Monia 9 Asts: Quinn 6		Pts: Verginis 19; Rebs: Kerusch 9 Asts: Mavraides 5

Basketball Center of Moscow Region, Khimki
Attendance: 1,900
Referees: Robert Vyklicky (CZE), Rustu Nuran (TUR), Arnis Ozols (LAT)

21 February 2012
18:00

Report

Donetsk (Ukraine)	93–87	(France) ASVEL
Scoring by quarter: 16–21, 16–19, 26–23, 35–24
Pts: Jackson 20; Rebs: Radenović 7 Asts: Curry 7		Pts: Jackson 19; Rebs: Thompson 5 Asts: Jackson, Thompson 5

Druzhba Palace of Sports, Donetsk
Attendance: 3,164
Referees: Radomir Vojinovic (MNE), Apostolos Kalpakas (SWE), Zdravko Rutesic (MNE)

=== Game 6 ===
28 February 2012
19:30

Report

Aris (Greece)	66–77	(Ukraine) Donetsk
Scoring by quarter: 18–24, 16–17, 11–21, 21–15
Pts: Davis 19; Rebs: Davis 5 Asts: Davis 3		Pts: Curry 15; Rebs: Lee 9 Asts: Avdalović 5

Alexandreio Melathron, Thessaloniki
Attendance: 1,112
Referees: Sinisa Herceg (CRO), Marius Ciulin (ROM), Petar Obradovic (BIH)

28 February 2012
19:30

Report

ASVEL (France)	79–83	(Russia) Khimki
Scoring by quarter: 14–23, 13–21, 21–23, 31–16
Pts: Thompson, Tillie 22; Rebs: Charitopoulos 5 Asts: Westermann 5		Pts: Kelati 17; Rebs: Zhukanenko 7 Asts: Khvostov, Gelabale 4

Astroballe, Villeurbanne
Attendance: 3,500
Referees: Juan Carlos Garcia Gonzalez (ESP), Mortiz Reiter (GER), Sergio Silva (POR)
