= 2019–20 FC Bayern Munich (basketball) season =

Sports season

Bayern Munich
2019–20 season
- Owner: FC Bayern Munich
- President: Uli Hoeneß (until 15 November 2019); Herbert Hainer (from 15 November 2019)
- Head coach: Dejan Radonjić (until 7 January 2020); Oliver Kostić (from 7 January 2020)
- Arena: Audi Dome
- Basketball Bundesliga: Postponed due to the COVID-19 pandemic
- Playoffs: Group stage
- EuroLeague: Cancelled due to the COVID-19 pandemic
- BBL-Pokal: Round of 16

The 2019–20 season is Bayern Munich's 73rd season in existence and the club's the 9th consecutive season in the Basketball Bundesliga and the 2nd consecutive season in the EuroLeague. It is the third consecutive season under head coach Dejan Radonjić, who signed in April 2018.

Times up to 26 October 2019 and from 29 March 2020 are CEST (UTC+2). Times from 27 October 2019 to 28 March 2020 are CET (UTC+1).

== Players ==
=== Squad information ===
Note: Flags indicate national team eligibility at FIBA-sanctioned events. Players may hold other non-FIBA nationalities not displayed.

FC Bayern Munich roster
Players
Coaches

Pos.	No.	Nat.	Name	Ht.	Age
G	5	(United States)	Bray, T.J.	1.96 m (6 ft 5 in)	34 – 14 June 1992
F	7	(Germany)	King, Alex	2.01 m (6 ft 7 in)	41 – 20 February 1985
G	8	(Finland)	Koponen, Petteri	1.94 m (6 ft 4 in)	38 – 13 April 1988
C	10	(United States)	Monroe, Greg	2.11 m (6 ft 11 in)	36 – 4 June 1990
F	11	(Serbia)	Lučić, Vladimir	2.04 m (6 ft 8 in)	37 – 17 June 1989
G	12	(Germany)	Lô, Maodo	1.91 m (6 ft 3 in)	33 – 31 December 1992
G/F	14	(Bosnia and Herzegovina)	Đedović, Nihad	1.99 m (6 ft 6 in)	36 – 12 January 1990
SF	16	(Germany)	Zipser, Paul	2.03 m (6 ft 8 in)	32 – 18 February 1994
G	21	(Italy)	Flaccadori, Diego	1.93 m (6 ft 4 in)	30 – 4 April 1996
F/C	22	(Germany)	Barthel, Danilo (C)	2.08 m (6 ft 10 in)	35 – 24 October 1991
G	25	(Germany)	Akpınar, İsmet	1.90 m (6 ft 3 in)	31 – 22 May 1995
F/C	26	(France)	Lessort, Mathias	2.06 m (6 ft 9 in)	31 – 29 September 1995
PG	31	(Slovenia)	Šiško, Žan Mark	1.90 m (6 ft 3 in)	29 – 29 June 1997
C	43	(Croatia)	Radošević, Leon	2.08 m (6 ft 10 in)	36 – 26 February 1990
SF	44	(Italy)	Grant, Sasha	1.98 m (6 ft 6 in)	24 – 15 February 2002

Head coach

- (Serbia) Oliver Kostić

Legend

- (C) Team captain
- Injured

=== Transactions ===
==== In ====
No.	Pos.	Nat.	Name	Age	Moving from		Type	Ends	Date	Source
5	G	(United States)	T.J. Bray	27	Rasta Vechta	(Germany)	End of contract	2022	11 July 2019	
34	F	(United States)	Josh Huestis	27	Austin Spurs	(United States)	End of contract	2020	24 July 2019	
10	C	(United States)	Greg Monroe	29	Philadelphia 76ers	(United States)	End of contract	2020	25 July 2019	
21	G	(Italy)	Diego Flaccadori	23	Dolomiti Energia Trento	(Italy)	End of contract	2021	31 July 2019	
26	F/C	(France)	Mathias Lessort	23	Unicaja	(Spain)	End of contract	2020	1 August 2019	
16	SF	(Germany)	Paul Zipser	25	San Pablo Burgos	(Spain)	End of contract	2021	5 August 2019	
20	G	(Serbia)	DeMarcus Nelson	33	LDLC ASVEL	(France)	End of contract	2020	6 September 2019	
31	PG	(Slovenia)	Žan Mark Šiško	22	Koper Primorska	(Slovenia)	Transfer	2022	28 December 2019	
25	G	(Germany)	İsmet Akpınar	24	Beşiktaş Sompo Sigorta	(Turkey)	Transfer	2020	25 May 2020	

==== Out ====
No.	Pos.	Nat.	Name	Age	Moving to		Type	Date	Source
3	G	(United States)	Braydon Hobbs	30	EWE Baskets Oldenburg	(Germany)	End of contract	1 July 2019	
31	F/C	(United States)	Devin Booker	28	Khimki	(Russia)	End of contract	16 July 2019	
16	G	(Serbia)	Stefan Jović	28	Khimki	(Russia)	End of contract	17 July 2019	
23	PF	(United States)	Derrick Williams	28	Fenerbahçe	(Turkey)	End of contract	17 July 2019	
26	F	(Austria)	Marvin Ogunsipe	23	Hamburg Towers	(Germany)	Loan	17 July 2019	
1	F	(Serbia)	Nemanja Dangubić	26	Movistar Estudiantes	(Spain)	End of contract	19 July 2019	
2	G	(Germany)	Nelson Weidemann	20	Brose Bamberg	(Germany)	Loan	22 July 2019	
13	PF	(Serbia)	Milan Mačvan	29	Alvark Tokyo	(Japan)	End of contract	25 July 2019	
35	G/F	(Germany)	Karim Jallow	22	Basketball Löwen Braunschweig	(Germany)	Transfer	31 July 2019	
15	G/F	(Germany)	Robin Amaize	25	EWE Baskets Oldenburg	(Germany)	Loan	5 August 2019	
20	G	(Serbia)	DeMarcus Nelson	33	Limoges CSP	(France)	End of contract	5 January 2020	
34	F	(United States)	Josh Huestis	27	Free agent	(United States)	Contract termination	10 March 2020	

== Pre-season and friendlies ==
Win Loss

== Competitions ==
=== Overview ===
Competition	First match	Last match	Starting round	Final position	Record							
Competition	First match	Last match	Starting round	Final position	Pld	W	D	L	PF	PA	PD	Win %
Basketball Bundesliga	30 September 2019		Round 1		21	19	0	2	1,788	1,555	+233	90.48
EuroLeague	3 October 2019	6 March 2020	Round 1	17th	28	8	0	20	2,064	2,281	−217	28.57
BBL-Pokal	28 September 2019		Round of 16	Round of 16	1	0	0	1	84	85	−1	0.00
Total					50	27	0	23	3,936	3,921	+15	54.00

Last updated: 8 March 2020
Source: Competitions

=== Basketball Bundesliga ===
==== League table ====
Pos	Team	Pld	W	L	PF	PA	PD	Pts	Qualification
1	Bayern Munich	21	19	2	1788	1555	+233	38	Closing tournament (Note: Because of the COVID-19 pandemic in Germany, the season was interrupted in March. The BBL proposed to let 10 teams finish the season in a closing tournament. It was also decided there is no relegation this season.)
2	MHP Riesen Ludwigsburg	21	17	4	1816	1655	+161	34	Closing tournament
3	Crailsheim Merlins	21	15	6	1890	1772	+118	30	Closing tournament
4	Alba Berlin	19	14	5	1774	1551	+223	28	Closing tournament
5	EWE Baskets Oldenburg	20	13	7	1687	1663	+24	26	Closing tournament
6	Rasta Vechta	21	12	9	1695	1718	−23	24 (Note: Vechta 80–66 Bamberg)	Closing tournament
7	Brose Bamberg	21	12	9	1734	1648	+86	24	Closing tournament
8	s.Oliver Würzburg	21	11	10	1755	1785	−30	22 (Note: Würzburg 90–75 Göttingen)	
9	BG Göttingen	21	11	10	1727	1788	−61	22	Closing tournament
10	ratiopharm Ulm	20	10	10	1748	1709	+39	20	Closing tournament
11	Basketball Löwen Braunschweig	20	9	11	1791	1831	−40	18	
12	Medi Bayreuth	21	9	12	1811	1811	0	18	
13	Gießen 46ers	20	6	14	1694	1785	−91	12	
14	Skyliners Frankfurt	21	6	15	1579	1692	−113	12	Closing tournament
15	Telekom Baskets Bonn	20	4	16	1687	1824	−137	8	
16	Mitteldeutscher BC	20	3	17	1791	1949	−158	6 (Note: Mitteldeutscher BC 104–83 Hamburg)	
17	Hamburg Towers	20	3	17	1624	1855	−231	6	

Source: BBL
Rules for classification: 1) points; 2) head-to-head points; 3) head-to-head points difference; 4) head-to-head number of points scored.

==== Results summary ====
Overall						Home					Away				
Pld	W	L	PF	PA	PD	W	L	PF	PA	PD	W	L	PF	PA	PD
21	19	2	1788	1555	+233	11	0	945	767	+178	8	2	843	788	+55

Last updated: 8 March 2020.
Source: Competitive matches

==== Results by round ====
Round	1	2	3	4	5	6	7	8	9	10	11	12	13	14	15	16	17	18	19	20	21	22	23	24	25	26	27	28	29	30	31	32	33	34
Ground	H	A	H	A	A	-	H	H	A	H	H	A	H	A	A	A	H	H	H	A	H	A	-	A	H	A	H	H	A	A	H	A	H	A
Result	W	W	W	W	W	-	W	W	W	W	W	W	W	W	W	L	W	W	W	L	W	W	-	V	V	V	V	V	V	V	V	V	V	V
Position	1	1	1	3	2	2	1	1	1	1	1	1	1	1	1	1	1	1	1	1	1	1	1											

First match(es) will be played on 30 September 2019. Source: Competitive matches
A = Away; H = Home; W = Win; L = Loss; V = Void

==== Matches ====
30 September 2019 1	Bayern Munich	111–55	Hamburg Towers	Munich
20:30	Scoring by quarter: 23–7, 35–10, 34–17, 19–21
	Pts: Đedović 20; Rebs: Monroe 10; Asts: Monroe 5 PIR: Monroe 27	Boxscore	Pts: Powell, Schaffartzik 10; Rebs: Ogunsipe, Yebo 5 Asts: Schaffartzik 4 PIR: Beech 10	Arena: Audi Dome; Attendance: 5,704; Referees: Clemens Fritz, Christof Madinger, Steve Bittner

6 October 2019 2	Fraport Skyliners	77–81	Bayern Munich	Frankfurt
15:00	Scoring by quarter: 22–15, 13–18, 23–26, 19–22
	Pts: Jones 26; Rebs: Hines, Robertson 6 Asts: Jones 5 PIR: Jones 22	Boxscore	Pts: Koponen 17; Rebs: Zipser 5 Asts: three players 3 PIR: Koponen, Zipser 18	Arena: Fraport Arena; Attendance: 4,300; Referees: Enrico Streit, Moritz Krüger, Julian Groll

12 October 2019 3	Bayern Munich	75–62	Löwen Braunschweig	Munich
20:30	Scoring by quarter: 23–13, 20–16, 21–19, 11–14
	Pts: Barthel 14; Rebs: Zipser 7 Asts: Monroe 6 PIR: Monroe 22	Boxscore	Pts: Mushidi 15; Rebs: Eatherton 10; Asts: three players 5 PIR: Eatherton 16	Arena: Audi Dome; Attendance: 4,746; Referees: Anne Panther, Carsten Straube, Michael Gutting

20 October 2019 4	EWE Baskets Oldenburg	83–90	Bayern Munich	Oldenburg
18:00	Scoring by quarter: 29–13, 17–24, 15–25, 22–28
	Pts: Blakes 19; Rebs: Hobbs, Mahalbašić 4 Asts: Mahalbašić 8 PIR: Mahalbašić 19	Boxscore	Pts: Koponen 18; Rebs: Barthel 8 Asts: Lô 5 PIR: Lô 21	Arena: Große EWE Arena; Attendance: 6,200; Referees: Anne Panther, Martin Matip, Radeesh Kattur

27 October 2019 5	s.Oliver Würzburg	82–90	Bayern Munich	Würzburg
15:00	Scoring by quarter: 17–16, 26–26, 11–25, 28–23
	Pts: Wells 17; Rebs: Rudd 5 Asts: Wells 7 PIR: Wells 19	Boxscore	Pts: Monroe, Zipser 13; Rebs: Lučić 6 Asts: Lô, Radošević 4 PIR: Monroe 18	Arena: s.Oliver Arena; Attendance: 3,140; Referees: Clemens Fritz, Toni Rodriguez, Konstantin Simonow

6	vs.

10 November 2019 7	Bayern Munich	84–80	Alba Berlin	Munich
15:00	Scoring by quarter: 16–22, 25–16, 21–15, 22–27
	Pts: King 19; Rebs: Monroe 9 Asts: Koponen 4 PIR: King 21	Boxscore	Pts: Giedraitis 17; Rebs: Hermannsson, Nnoko 5 Asts: Hermannsson, Sikma 6 PIR: Giedraitis 18	Arena: Audi Dome; Attendance: 6,500; Referees: Robert Lottermoser, Carsten Straube, Christof Madinger

17 November 2019 8	Bayern Munich	91–79	medi bayreuth	Munich
15:00	Scoring by quarter: 21–20, 21–20, 26–18, 23–21
	Pts: Zipser 20; Rebs: Zipser 6 Asts: Monroe 5 PIR: Lučić, Zipser 22	Boxscore	Pts: Travis 26; Rebs: Travis 6 Asts: Doreth 6 PIR: Travis 21	Arena: Audi Dome; Attendance: 5,505; Referees: Moritz Reiter, Johannes Hack, Nicolas Brendel

24 November 2019 9	SYNTAINICS MBC	86–96	Bayern Munich	Leipzig
15:00	Scoring by quarter: 18–26, 25–22, 18–25, 25–23
	Pts: Mićović 16; Rebs: Kerusch 7 Asts: Gbinije 7 PIR: Kerusch 19	Boxscore	Pts: Zipser 16; Rebs: Lessort 8 Asts: Lô, Lučić 4 PIR: Lessort 19	Arena: Arena Leipzig; Attendance: 5,180; Referees: Toni Rodriguez, Gentian Cici, Stefan Fingerling

1 December 2019 10	Bayern Munich	82–63	HAKRO Merlins Crailsheim	Munich
18:00	Scoring by quarter: 20–13, 25–22, 12–18, 25–10
	Pts: Monroe 14; Rebs: Lučić, Zipser 5 Asts: Lô, Monroe 5 PIR: Monroe 19	Boxscore	Pts: Ford 19; Rebs: Ford 6 Asts: Russell 9 PIR: Ford 22	Arena: Audi Dome; Attendance: 4,863; Referees: Carsten Straube, Enrico Streit, Konstantin Simonow

8 December 2019 11	Bayern Munich	82–81	BG Göttingen	Munich
15:00	Scoring by quarter: 14–11, 20–26, 19–23, 29–21
	Pts: Monroe 22; Rebs: Nelson 6 Asts: three players 3 PIR: Monroe 21	Boxscore	Pts: Hundt 19; Rebs: Osetkowski 5 Asts: Hundt 4 PIR: Hundt 19	Arena: Audi Dome; Attendance: 5,231; Referees: Christof Madinger, Nesa Kovačević, Andreas Bohn

22 December 2019 12	Gießen 46ers	70–82	Bayern Munich	Gießen
15:00	Scoring by quarter: 21–17, 8–25, 20–21, 21–19
	Pts: Bryant 15; Rebs: Bryant 12; Asts: Brown 6 PIR: Thomas 15	Boxscore	Pts: Barthel, Lessort 13; Rebs: Lessort, Radošević 9 Asts: Flaccadori 4 PIR: Lessort 20	Arena: Sporthalle Gießen-Ost; Attendance: 3,752; Referees: Carsten Straube, Zulfikar Oruzgani, Dominik Bejaoui

26 November 2019 13	Bayern Munich	83–69	ratiopharm Ulm	Munich
20:30	Scoring by quarter: 20–17, 27–18, 25–15, 11–19
	Pts: Zipser 16; Rebs: Barthel, Zipser 6 Asts: Koponen 4 PIR: Zipser 18	Boxscore	Pts: Dragić 19; Rebs: Hinrichs 11; Asts: Hayes, Hinrichs 5 PIR: Dragić 19	Arena: Audi Dome; Attendance: 4,308; Referees: Anne Panther, Moritz Krüper, Julian Groll

30 December 2019 14	Brose Bamberg	76–82	Bayern Munich	Bamberg
20:30	Scoring by quarter: 17–21, 22–22, 22–21, 15–18
	Pts: Lee 23; Rebs: Marei 8 Asts: Lee 8 PIR: Lee 26	Boxscore	Pts: Monroe 20; Rebs: Monroe 6 Asts: Lô 4 PIR: Lučić 25	Arena: Brose Arena; Attendance: 6,150; Referees: Robert Lottermoser, Gentian Cici, Tamer Arik

5 January 2019 15	Rasta Vechta	68–76	Bayern Munich	Vechta
15:00	Scoring by quarter: 16–27, 17–10, 9–18, 26–21
	Pts: Vasturia 17; Rebs: Murphy 8 Asts: Murphy 3 PIR: Wainright 18	Boxscore	Pts: Koponen 19; Rebs: Lučić 11; Asts: King 5 PIR: Koponen 21	Arena: RASTA Dome; Attendance: 3,140; Referees: Martin Matip, Julian Groll, Stefan Fingerling

19 January 2019 16	MHP Riesen Ludwigsburg	81–74	Bayern Munich	Ludwigsburg
15:00	Scoring by quarter: 15–10, 22–21, 24–20, 20–23
	Pts: Carrington 25; Rebs: Carrington 7 Asts: Knight 4 PIR: Carrington 24	Boxscore	Pts: Monroe 18; Rebs: Zipser 7 Asts: Šiško 6 PIR: Monroe 17	Arena: MHP Arena; Attendance: 4,129; Referees: Clemens Fritz, Moritz Reiter, Moritz Krüper

26 January 2019 17	Bayern Munich	93–85	Telekom Baskets Bonn	Munich
18:00	Scoring by quarter: 26–7, 25–24, 11–25, 31–29
	Pts: Monroe 22; Rebs: Monroe 11; Asts: three players 6 PIR: Monroe 38	Boxscore	Pts: Frazier 21; Rebs: Zimmerman 7 Asts: four players 3 PIR: Frazier 19	Arena: Audi Dome; Attendance: 4,757; Referees: Robert Lottermoser, Johannes Hack, Konstantin Simonow

2 February 2020 18	Bayern Munich	71–60	s.Oliver Würzburg	Munich
15:00	Scoring by quarter: 13–7, 12–18, 24–25, 22–10
		Boxscore		Arena: Audi Dome; Attendance: 5,630; Referees: Martin Matip, Toni Rodriguez, Nicolas Brendel

9 February 2020 19	Bayern Munich	94–75	Gießen 46ers	Munich
15:00	Scoring by quarter: 26–18, 21–14, 20–20, 27–13
		Boxscore		Arena: Audi Dome; Attendance: 4,850; Referees: Christof Malinger, Nesa Kovačević, Dominik Bejaoui

11 February 2020 20	BG Göttingen	90–81	Bayern Munich	Göttingen
20:30	Scoring by quarter: 21–16, 23–24, 27–20, 19–21
		Boxscore		Arena: Sparkassen Arena; Attendance: 3,447; Referees: Oliver Krause, Gentian Cici, Dennis Sirowi

21	vs.

22	vs.

23	vs.

24	vs.

25	vs.

26	vs.

27	vs.

28	vs.

29	vs.

30	vs.

31	vs.

32	vs.

33	vs.

34	vs.

=== EuroLeague ===
==== League table ====
Pos	Team	Pld	W	L	PF	PA	PD
14	(Serbia) Crvena zvezda mts	28	11	17	2079	2108	−29
15	(France) LDLC ASVEL	28	10	18	2073	2284	−211
16	(Germany) ALBA Berlin	28	9	19	2304	2423	−119
17	(Germany) Bayern Munich	28	8	20	2064	2281	−217
18	(Russia) Zenit Saint Petersburg	28	8	20	2055	2240	−185

Source: EuroLeague
Rules for classification: All points scored in extra period(s) were not counted in the standings, nor for any tie-break situation.

==== Results summary ====
Overall						Home					Away				
Pld	W	L	PF	PA	PD	W	L	PF	PA	PD	W	L	PF	PA	PD
28	8	20	2064	2181	−117	6	8	1078	1099	−21	2	12	986	1082	−96

Last updated: 6 March 2020.
Source: Competitive matches

==== Results by round ====
Round	1	2	3	4	5	6	7	8	9	10	11	12	13	14	15	16	17	18	19	20	21	22	23	24	25	26	27	28	29	30	31	32	33	34
Ground	H	A	H	H	H	A	A	A	H	H	A	A	H	A	H	H	A	H	A	A	H	A	A	H	H	A	H	A	A	H	H	A	H	A
Result	W	L	W	L	W	L	L	L	W	L	L	L	W	W	L	L	L	L	L	L	W	L	L	L	L	W	L	L	V	V	V	V	V	V
Position	4	11	3	6	6	10	12	12	11	12	16	16	15	12	14	14	15	15	18	18	18	18	18	18	18	17	17	17						

First match(es) will be played on 3 October 2019. Source: Competitive matches
A = Away; H = Home; W = Win; L = Loss; V = Void

==== Matches ====
3 October 2019 1	Bayern Munich (Germany)	78–64	(Italy) AX Armani Exchange Milan	Munich
20:30	Scoring by quarter: 22-23, 20-11, 19-16, 17-14
	Pts: Lučić 18; Rebs: Monroe 10; Asts: Monroe 4 PIR: Lučić 26	Boxscore	Pts: Scola 17; Rebs: Tarczewski 8 Asts: Rodríguez 6 PIR: Scola 17	Arena: Audi Dome; Attendance: 4,270; Referees: (Spain) Miguel Ángel Pérez Niz, (Portugal) Fernando Rocha, (United Kingdom) Eduard Udyanskyy

10 October 2019 2	CSKA Moscow (Russia)	79–68	(Germany) Bayern Munich	Moscow
19:00	Scoring by quarter: 22–18, 25–22, 13–10, 19–18
	Pts: Clyburn 15; Rebs: Voigtmann 12; Asts: James 5 PIR: Clyburn 18	Boxscore	Pts: Monroe 17; Rebs: Monroe 10; Asts: Đedović, Monroe 3 PIR: Monroe 27	Arena: Megasport Arena; Attendance: 6,072; Referees: (Serbia) Ilija Belošević, (Slovenia) Saša Pukl, (Ukraine) Boris Ryzhyk

17 October 2019 3	Bayern Munich (Germany)	104–63	(France) LDLC ASVEL	Munich
20:30	Scoring by quarter: 30–13, 27–22, 26–16, 21–12
	Pts: Lô 19; Rebs: Monroe, Nelson 6 Asts: Koponen 5 PIR: Lô 21	Boxscore	Pts: Noua 16; Rebs: Jekiri 7 Asts: Jackson 5 PIR: Diot 17	Arena: Audi Dome; Attendance: 3,566; Referees: (Spain) Juan Carlos García González, (Estonia) Aare Halliko, (Greece) Vasiliki Tsaroucha

24 October 2019 4	Bayern Munich (Germany)	74–87	(Russia) Khimki	Munich
20:30	Scoring by quarter: 19–17, 18–27, 18–26, 19–17
	Pts: Monroe 18; Rebs: Lučić, Monroe 5 Asts: Monroe 4 PIR: Monroe 18	Boxscore	Pts: Shved 19; Rebs: Gill 6 Asts: Shved 9 PIR: Shved 21	Arena: Audi Dome; Attendance: 3,524; Referees: (Spain) Daniel Hierrezuelo, (Croatia) Tomislav Hordov, (Latvia) Ingus Baumanis

30 October 2019 5	Bayern Munich (Germany)	95–86	(Spain) Real Madrid	Munich
20:30	Scoring by quarter: 22–20, 19–18, 26–19, 28–29
	Pts: Monroe 18; Rebs: Lučić 6 Asts: Lô 7 PIR: Barthel 24	Boxscore	Pts: Randolph 17; Rebs: Randolph 10; Asts: Campazzo 6 PIR: Garuba, Randolph 20	Arena: Audi Dome; Attendance: 5,763; Referees: (Slovenia) Matej Boltauzer, (Greece) Spiros Gkontas, (Russia) Semen Ovinov

1 November 2019 6	Kirolbet Baskonia (Spain)	93–60	(Germany) Bayern Munich	Vitoria-Gasteiz
21:00	Scoring by quarter: 29–10, 23–19, 14–18, 27–13
	Pts: Shengelia 19; Rebs: Fall 8 Asts: Vildoza 6 PIR: Shengelia 28	Boxscore	Pts: Monroe 18; Rebs: Zipser 8 Asts: Flaccadori, Radošević 2 PIR: Monroe 19	Arena: Buesa Arena; Attendance: 10,758; Referees: (Italy) Luigi Lamonica, (Latvia) Oļegs Latiševs, (Poland) Tomasz Trawicki

8 November 2019 7	Fenerbahçe Beko (Turkey)	90–82	(Germany) Bayern Munich	Istanbul
18:45	Scoring by quarter: 18–15, 22–24, 21–23, 29–20
	Pts: Williams 19; Rebs: Veselý 4 Asts: Kalinić 5 PIR: de Colo 24	Boxscore	Pts: Monroe 19; Rebs: Lučić, Monroe 7 Asts: Lô 6 PIR: Monroe 26	Arena: Ülker Sports and Event Hall; Attendance: 8,871; Referees: (Croatia) Sreten Radović, (Greece) Ioannis Foufis, (Spain) Carlos Peruga

15 November 2019 8	Valencia Basket (Spain)	82–56	(Germany) Bayern Munich	Valencia
21:00	Scoring by quarter: 20–16, 19–13, 20–18, 23–9
	Pts: Marinković 19; Rebs: Dubljević 7 Asts: Colom, Loyd 4 PIR: Motum 18	Boxscore	Pts: Lučić 14; Rebs: Radošević 4 Asts: three players 2 PIR: Lučić 13	Arena: La Fonteta; Attendance: 7,166; Referees: (Greece) Christos Christodoulou, (Portugal) Sérgio Silva, (Italy) Michele Rossi

19 November 2019 9	Bayern Munich (Germany)	85–82	(Greece) Olympiacos	Munich
20:30	Scoring by quarter: 23–17, 20–27, 12–19, 30–19
	Pts: Lô 19; Rebs: Monroe 7 Asts: Lô 7 PIR: Lô 25	Boxscore	Pts: Baldwin 19; Rebs: Rubit 6 Asts: Rochestie 6 PIR: Baldwin 17	Arena: Audi Dome; Attendance: 4,461; Referees: (Spain) Juan Carlos García González, (Serbia) Milivoje Jovčić, (France) Hugues Thépénier

22 November 2019 10	Bayern Munich (Germany)	75–87	(Greece) Panathinaikos OPAP	Munich
20:30	Scoring by quarter: 24–16, 11–20, 18–29, 22–22
	Pts: Zipser 23; Rebs: Monroe 8 Asts: Nelson 4 PIR: Zipser 29	Boxscore	Pts: Thomas 14; Rebs: Calathes 7 Asts: Calathes, Rice 5 PIR: Rice 19	Arena: Audi Dome; Attendance: 5,563; Referees: (Slovenia) Matej Boltauzer, (Spain) Carlos Cortés, (Croatia) Josip Radojković

29 November 2019 11	Anadolu Efes (Turkey)	104–75	(Germany) Bayern Munich	Istanbul
18:30	Scoring by quarter: 30–22, 27–18, 19–18, 28–17
	Pts: Larkin 49; Rebs: Anderson 9 Asts: three players 5 PIR: Larkin 53	Boxscore	Pts: Lučić 20; Rebs: Lučić 4 Asts: Monroe 5 PIR: Lučić 28	Arena: Sinan Erdem Dome; Attendance: 14,902; Referees: (Slovenia) Damir Javor, (Spain) Emilio Pérez Pizarro, (Poland) Tomasz Trawicki

5 December 2019 12	Maccabi Tel Aviv (Israel)	77–55	(Germany) Bayern Munich	Tel Aviv
20:05	Scoring by quarter: 22–18, 19–8, 12–21, 24–8
	Pts: Wilbekin 16; Rebs: Zoosman 8 Asts: three players 2 PIR: Hunter 18	Boxscore	Pts: Koponen, Lučić 10; Rebs: Barthel, Monroe 6 Asts: Barthel 4 PIR: Lessort, Lučić 15	Arena: Menora Mivtachim Arena; Attendance: 10,389; Referees: (Slovenia) Saša Pukl, (Latvia) Oļegs Latiševs, (Lithuania) Jurgis Laurinavičius

13 December 2019 13	Bayern Munich (Germany)	77–69	(Russia) Zenit Saint Petersburg	Munich
20:30	Scoring by quarter: 14–15, 23–20, 24–15, 16–19
	Pts: Lučić 17; Rebs: Barthel 8 Asts: Lô 7 PIR: Lučić 25	Boxscore	Pts: Renfroe 18; Rebs: Ayón 5 Asts: three players 2 PIR: Abromaitis 18	Arena: Audi Dome; Attendance: 4,043; Referees: (Italy) Luigi Lamonica, (Croatia) Tomislav Hordov, (United Kingdom) Eduard Udyanskyy

18 December 2019 14	ALBA Berlin (Germany)	76–77(OT)	(Germany) Bayern Munich	Berlin
20:00	Scoring by quarter: 10–19, 18–11, 20–20, 24–22, Overtime: 4–5
	Pts: Mason 17; Rebs: Nnoko, Sikma 11; Asts: Hermannsson 6 PIR: Sikma 20	Boxscore	Pts: Lučić 19; Rebs: Monroe 10; Asts: Lô, Nelson 4 PIR: Monroe 25	Arena: Mercedes-Benz Arena; Attendance: 11,229; Referees: (Greece) Christos Christodoulou, (Spain) Carlos Peruga, (Belgium) Nick Van Den Broeck

20 December 2019 15	Bayern Munich (Germany)	67–77	(Spain) Barcelona	Munich
20:30	Scoring by quarter: 16–20, 9–19, 20–17, 22–21
	Pts: Zipser 19; Rebs: Lučić 4 Asts: Flaccadori 5 PIR: Zipser 17	Boxscore	Pts: Higgins 16; Rebs: Mirotić 9 Asts: Hanga 10; PIR: Hanga 23	Arena: Audi Dome; Attendance: 5,610; Referees: (Slovenia) Matej Boltauzer, (Greece) Ioannis Foufis, (France) Hugues Thépénier

27 December 2019 16	Bayern Munich (Germany)	73–98	(Lithuania) Žalgiris	Munich
20:30	Scoring by quarter: 13–21, 22–22, 15–25, 23–30
	Pts: Barthel 20; Rebs: Monroe 7 Asts: Lô 7 PIR: Barthel 23	Boxscore	Pts: LeDay, Milaknis 19; Rebs: Jankūnas, LeDay 5 Asts: Walkup 11; PIR: Walkup 26	Arena: Audi Dome; Attendance: 5,989; Referees: (Spain) Miguel Ángel Pérez Pérez, (Serbia) Milivoje Jovčić, (Turkey) Ersan Kartal

2 January 2020 17	Crvena zvezda mts (Serbia)	93–63	(Germany) Bayern Munich	Belgrade
19:00	Scoring by quarter: 25–13, 28–18, 18–15, 22–17
	Pts: L. Brown, Punter 15; Rebs: Kuzmić 7 Asts: L. Brown 7 PIR: L. Brown 26	Boxscore	Pts: Monroe 20; Rebs: Radošević, Zipser 6 Asts: Lô, Monroe 3 PIR: Monroe 28	Arena: Štark Arena; Attendance: 16,824; Referees: (Italy) Carmelo Paternicò, (Spain) Emilio Pérez Pizarro, (Latvia) Ingus Baumanis

10 January 2020 18	Bayern Munich (Germany)	77–84	(Russia) CSKA Moscow	Munich
20:30	Scoring by quarter: 10–18, 15–23, 27–18, 25–25
	Pts: Monroe 20; Rebs: Monroe 10; Asts: Đedović 8 PIR: Huestis, Monroe 19	Boxscore	Pts: James 27; Rebs: Hines 8 Asts: James 7 PIR: James 32	Arena: Audi Dome; Attendance: 5,251; Referees: (Latvia) Oļegs Latiševs, (Spain) Carlos Cortés, (Poland) Marcin Kowalski

15 January 2020 19	Panathinaikos OPAP (Greece)	98–83	(Germany) Bayern Munich	Athens
20:00	Scoring by quarter: 28–18, 25–35, 23–22, 22–8
	Pts: Thomas 18; Rebs: Papapetrou, Thomas 9 Asts: Calathes 12; PIR: Thomas 28	Boxscore	Pts: Monroe 17; Rebs: Monroe 9 Asts: Bray 5 PIR: Monroe 26	Arena: O.A.K.A. Attendance: 8,013; Referees: (Spain) Daniel Hierrezuelo, (Finland) Petri Mäntylä, (Turkey) Sinan İşgüder

17 January 2020 20	Olympiacos (Greece)	89–72	(Germany) Bayern Munich	Piraeus
20:30	Scoring by quarter: 17–14, 20–18, 17–21, 35–19
	Pts: Vezenkov 20; Rebs: Printezis 6 Asts: Rochestie 12; PIR: Vezenkov 24	Boxscore	Pts: Bray, Lučić 15; Rebs: Monroe 12; Asts: Lô, Lučić 5 PIR: Lučić, Monroe 19	Arena: Peace and Friendship Stadium; Attendance: 7,121; Referees: (Ukraine) Borys Ryzhyk, (Turkey) Emin Moğulkoç, (United Kingdom) Eduard Udyanskyy

23 January 2020 21	Bayern Munich (Germany)	80–68	(Israel) Maccabi Tel Aviv	Munich
20:30	Scoring by quarter: 23–12, 12–21, 22–20, 23–15
	Pts: Đedović 19; Rebs: Monroe 10; Asts: three players 3 PIR: Zipser 24	Boxscore	Pts: Bryant 14; Rebs: Hunter 7 Asts: Wilbekin 8 PIR: Jackson 18	Arena: Audi Dome; Attendance: 3,980; Referees: (Spain) Miguel Ángel Pérez Pérez, (Slovenia) Damir Javor, (Ukraine) Mykola Ambrosov

31 January 2020 22	A|X Armani Exchange Milan (Italy)	79–78	(Germany) Bayern Munich	Assago
20:45	Scoring by quarter: 21–26, 17–19, 15–21, 26–12
	Pts: Micov 16; Rebs: Gudaitis 7 Asts: Rodríguez 10; PIR: Rodríguez 16	Boxscore	Pts: Barthel 18; Rebs: Zipser 6 Asts: Monroe 6 PIR: Zipser 20	Arena: Mediolanum Forum; Attendance: 7,991; Referees: Matej Boltauzer, Oļegs Latiševs, Sinan İşgüder

4 February 2020 23	LDLC ASVEL (France)	75–65	(Germany) Bayern Munich	Villeurbanne
20:45	Scoring by quarter: 16–18, 18–17, 20–16, 21–14
	Pts: Payne, Taylor 15; Rebs: Payne 8 Asts: Taylor 8 PIR: Payne 20	Boxscore	Pts: Lessort, Lučić 14; Rebs: Monroe 7 Asts: Bray 6 PIR: Lučić 17	Arena: Astroballe; Attendance: 5,284; Referees: Carmelo Paternicò, Emilio Pérez Pizarro, Tomasz Trawicki

7 February 2020 24	Bayern Munich (Germany)	59–66	(Spain) Valencia Basket	Munich
20:30	Scoring by quarter: 13–15, 17–9, 16–21, 13–21
	Pts: Monroe 15; Rebs: Monroe 6 Asts: Šiško 6 PIR: Monroe 15	Boxscore	Pts: Doornekamp, Tobey 11; Rebs: Tobey 6 Asts: Colom 5 PIR: Doornekamp 14	Arena: Audi Dome; Attendance: 4,412; Referees: Luigi Lamonica, Sašo Petek, Josip Radojković

21 February 2020 25	Bayern Munich (Germany)	63–88	(Turkey) Anadolu Efes	Munich
20:30	Scoring by quarter: 17–19, 8–18, 23–25, 15–26
	Pts: Lô, Lučić 14; Rebs: Monroe 8 Asts: Monroe 4 PIR: Lučić 15	Boxscore	Pts: Beaubois 16; Rebs: Anderson 6 Asts: Micić 8 PIR: Micić 21	Arena: Audi Dome; Attendance: 4,850; Referees: Daniel Hierrezuelo, Tomislav Hordov, Marko Juras

28 February 2020 26	Zenit Saint Petersburg (Russia)	68–77	(Germany) Bayern Munich	Saint Petersburg
18:00	Scoring by quarter: 20–19, 16–21, 18–20, 14–17
	Pts: Hollins 18; Rebs: Abromaitis 6 Asts: Khvostov 6 PIR: Ayón 24	Boxscore	Pts: Monroe 26; Rebs: Monroe 8 Asts: Lô 8 PIR: Monroe 31	Arena: Sibur Arena; Attendance: 4,689; Referees: Sasa Pukl, Petri Mantyla, Rain Peerandi

4 March 2020 27	Bayern Munich (Germany)	71–80	(Spain) Kirolbet Baskonia	Munich
20:30	Scoring by quarter: 25–21, 16–23, 13–16, 17–20
	Pts: Monroe 18; Rebs: Monroe 6 Asts: Lô 4 PIR: Monroe 29	Boxscore	Pts: Eric 16; Rebs: Three players 4 Asts: Shengelia 5 PIR: Shengelia 18	Arena: Audi Dome; Attendance: 4,345 (tentative); Referees: Jakub Zamojski, Mehdi Difallah, Vasiliki Tsaroucha

6 March 2020 27	Barcelona (Spain)	83–80	(Germany) Bayern Munich	Barcelona
21:00	Scoring by quarter: 21–21, 21–20, 15–27, 24–12
	Pts: Mirotić 28; Rebs: Mirotić 8 Asts: Higgins, Mirotić 4 PIR: Mirotić 37	Boxscore	Pts: Monroe 19; Rebs: Monroe 8 Asts: Zipser 4 PIR: Lučić 19	Arena: Palau Blaugrana; Attendance: 5,788; Referees: Matej Boltauzer, Milivoje Jovčić, Michele Rossi

13 March 2020 29	Khimki (Russia)	vs.	(Germany) Bayern Munich	Mytishchi
18:00
		Boxscore		Arena: Mytishchi Arena

20 March 2020 30	Bayern Munich (Germany)	vs.	(Turkey) Fenerbahçe Beko	Munich
20:30
		Boxscore		Arena: Audi Dome

24 March 2020 31	Bayern Munich (Germany)	vs.	(Germany) ALBA Berlin	Munich
20:30
		Boxscore		Arena: Audi Dome

26 March 2020 32	Real Madrid (Spain)	vs.	(Germany) Bayern Munich	Madrid
21:00
		Boxscore		Arena: WiZink Center

3 April 2020 33	Bayern Munich (Germany)	vs.	(Serbia) Crvena zvezda mts	Munich
20:30
		Boxscore		Arena: Audi Dome

10 April 2020 34	Žalgiris (Lithuania)	vs.	(Germany) Bayern Munich	Kaunas
19:00
		Boxscore		Arena: Žalgirio Arena

=== BBL-Pokal ===
==== Round of 16 ====
14 October 2019	Bayern Munich	84–85	Telekom Baskets Bonn	Munich
20:30	Scoring by quarter: 22–21, 18–32, 24–10, 20–22
	Pts: Lô 19; Rebs: Barthel 5 Asts: Lô 3 PIR: Monroe 20	Boxscore	Pts: Breunig, Saibou 14; Rebs: Breunig, DiLeo 5 Asts: Saibou 6 PIR: Saibou 22	Arena: Audi Dome; Attendance: 3,914; Referees: Robert Lottermoser, Christof Madinger, Gentian Cici
