= Derrick Townsel =

American gridiron football player (born 1988)

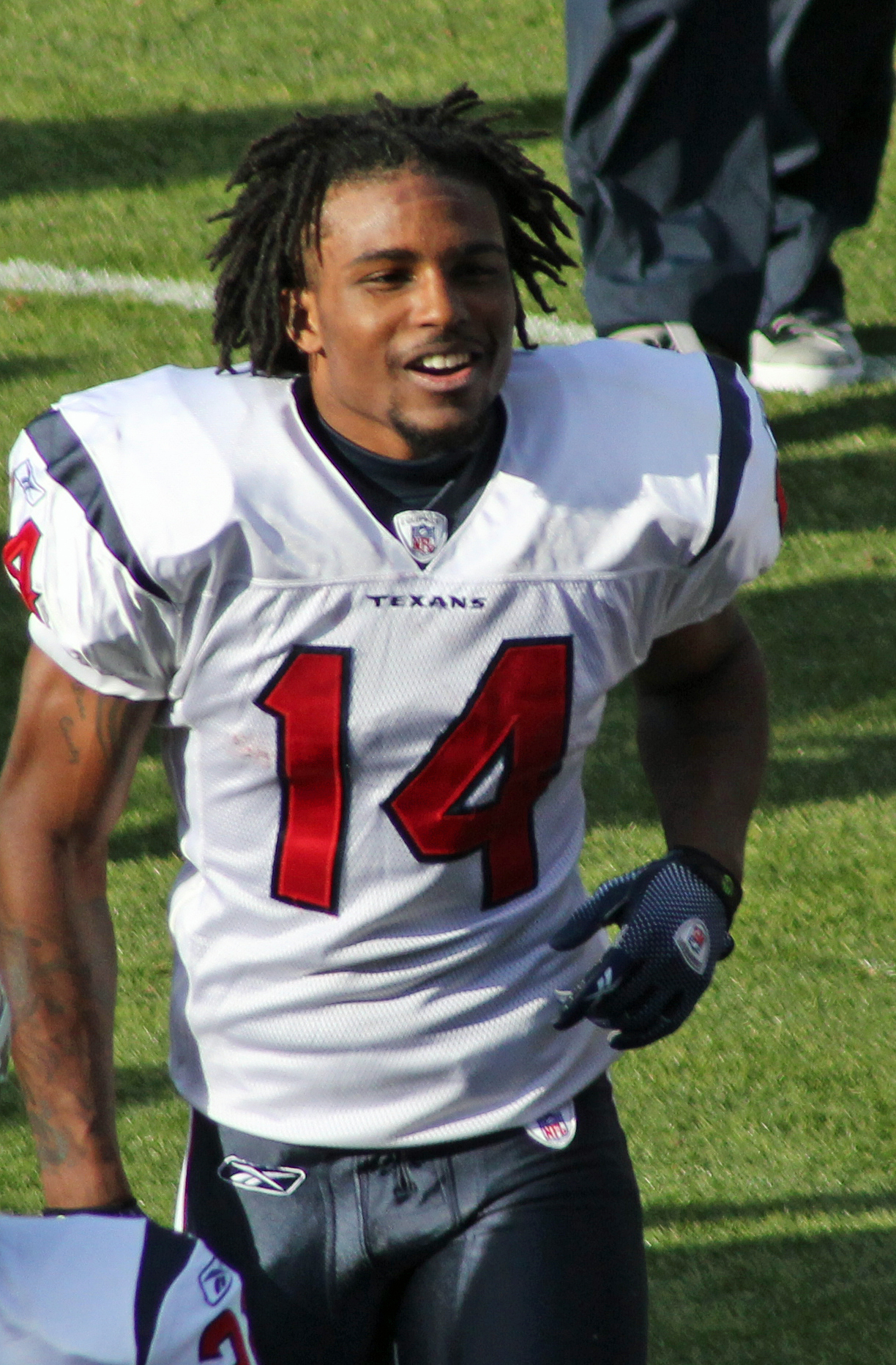
- Townsel with the Houston Texans in 2010

No. 14, 8
- Position: Wide receiver

Personal information
- Born: July 12, 1988 (age 38); Dade County, Florida, U.S.
- Listed height: 5 ft 9 in (1.75 m)
- Listed weight: 175 lb (79 kg)

Career information
- High school: Memphis (TN) Overton
- College: Murray State
- NFL draft: 2010: undrafted

Career history
- Jacksonville Jaguars (2010)*; Houston Texans (2010); Edmonton Eskimos (2012)*; Omaha Nighthawks (2012); Orlando Predators (2013)
- * Offseason or practice squad member only

Awards and highlights
- Second-team OVC (2009)
- Stats at Pro Football Reference

Derrick Joseph "DJ" Townsel (born July 12, 1988) is an American former professional football wide receiver. He was signed by the Jacksonville Jaguars as an undrafted free agent in 2010. He played college football at Murray State.

== Early life ==
Townsel was born in Dade County, Florida. He attended Overton High School in Memphis, Tennessee. He caught 26 passes for 541 yards and four touchdowns his junior season, and 34 passes for 657 yards and eight touchdowns his senior season. Townsel twice earned both OHS Offensive Player of the Year and all-region honors in high school.

== College career ==
Townsel then played college football for the Murray State Racers from 2006 to 2009. He played in 10 games during his freshman season, recording 19 receptions for 234 yards and 11 kickoff returns for 142 yards. He appeared in 10 games in 2007, totaling 37 catches for 359 yards and two touchdowns. Townsel played in nine games in 2008, catching 53 passes for 667 yards and three touchdowns while also returning a punt for a touchdown. He missed three games due to injury that season. He recorded 44 receptions for 452 yards and no touchdowns during his senior year in 2009, garnering second-team All-OVC recognition.

Townsel finished his college career with 153 catches for 1,712 yards and five touchdowns. He majored in graphic design at Murray State.

== Professional career ==
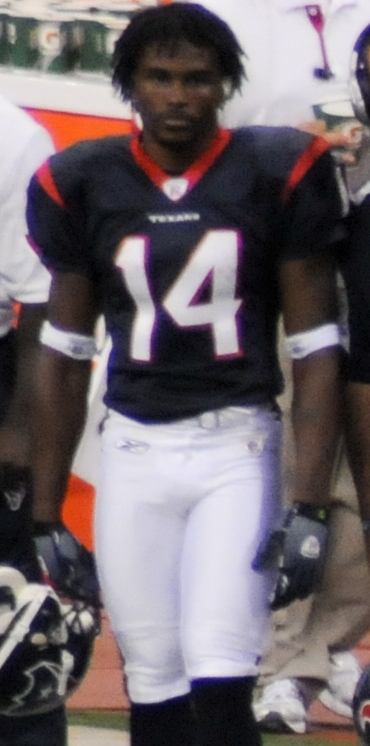
Townsel with the Texans during the 2010 preseason

=== Jacksonville Jaguars ===
Townsel was signed by the Jacksonville Jaguars as an undrafted free agent following the 2010 NFL draft on August 5, 2010. He was waived on August 17 to make room for linebacker Rod Wilson.

=== Houston Texans ===
Townsel was signed by the Houston Texans on August 23. He was waived during final cuts on September 3, but was re-signed to the team's practice squad on September 8. He was promoted to the active roster on December 15. He appeared in one game for the Texans during the 2010 season but recorded no statistics. Townsel was waived on September 3, 2011.

=== Edmonton Eskimos ===
Townsel was signed by the Edmonton Eskimos on January 10, 2012. He was released during training camp on June 17, 2012.

=== Omaha Nighthawks ===
Townsel played in one game for the Omaha Nighthawks of the United Football League in 2012, recording one punt return for -4 yards and one tackle.

=== Orlando Predators ===
Townsel was assigned to the Orlando Predators of the Arena Football League on March 6, 2013. Townsel was reassigned on March 17 before the Predators' first game of the season, but was assigned to the Predators again on March 27, following their Week 1 game. He was later reassigned again on April 8, assigned again on April 26, and reassigned for the final time on May 2, 2013. Overall, he recorded three receptions for 68 yards and one touchdown, two rushes for three yards, and one solo tackle for the Predators during the 2013 season.

== Television ==
In 2019, Townsel was a contestant on The Titan Games. During biographical footage used in the series, Townsel revealed that since his football career, he has become a professional yogi. In The Titan Games he conquered Mount Olympus against Matt Cable to become a Titan.
