= Overton High School (Memphis, Tennessee) =

American high school

Location
- 1770 Lanier Lane; Memphis, Tennessee 38117; United States
- Coordinates: 35.08361°N 89.90452°W

Information
- Type: Public secondary Creative and Performing Arts
- Motto: "Creating stars in the classroom and on the stage".
- Established: 1959
- School district: Memphis-Shelby County Schools
- NCES District ID: 4700148
- NCES School ID: 470014801130
- Principal: Reginald Williams
- Teaching staff: 79.10 (FTE)
- Grades: 9–12
- Enrollment: 1,491 (2023–2024)
- Student to teacher ratio: 18.85
- Campus: Urban
- Colors: Royal blue, white and gray
- Mascot: Wolverines
- Website: overton-hs.scsk12.org

Overton High School is a secondary school for the Creative and Performing Arts located in Memphis, Tennessee.

The school, which serves grades 9 through 12, is a part of the Memphis-Shelby County Schools district. Built in the Memphis City School district, the school became a part of the then Shelby County Schools district when the school district surrendered its charter in 2014.

The school was named in honor of former Mayor of Memphis, S. Watkins Overton.

== Athletics ==
Overton's sports programs include:

- Boys' sports: basketball, baseball, bowling, cross country, football, golf, soccer, tennis, and track.
- Girls' sports: basketball, bowling, cheerleading, cross country, golf, pom pom, soccer, softball, tennis, track, and volleyball.

== Fine arts ==
Overton was declared a performing arts high school in 1976. The late Dr. Lulah M. Hedgeman was selected as choir director in 1976 and, within five years, grew the program from 25 students to a choir of 150 students. The choir, under Hedgeman, performed a full concert in 1988 at Carnegie Hall in New York City. The choirs were invited to Nice, France, four times as guests of the city. Hedgeman was honored by the Walt Disney company in 1990 in their first production of The Salute to the American Teacher Awards. The Overton Choirs program, under the direction of Hedgeman, were ranked number 1 in the state of Tennessee for 21 consecutive years until Hedgeman's death in December 1997.

The vocal music department at Overton is still ranked the number 1 performing arts high school choir in the city of Memphis as of April 2016.

The band is the 2008 Division AAA Champions of the University of Memphis Bandmasters Championship and the 2008 Smoky Mountains Invitational Champions.

Other aspects of the CAPA program include creative writing, choirs, orchestra, jazz ensembles, drama, dance, and visual arts. Students must audition to qualify for CAPA programs.

The creative writing program, run by Shannon Marszalek, frequently hosts poetry slams. A Poetry Out Loud competition was held on Saturday, February 4, 2012. Many of the Scholastic Gold Keys come from both the creative writing department and the art department.

== Notable alumni ==
- Vernice Armour – First African-American combat pilot in the United States Marine Corps to fly the Bell AH-1 SuperCobra helicopter during the Iraq War.
- Antonius Cleveland (born 1994) – basketball player in the Israeli Basketball Premier League
- O'landa Draper – singer, choir director
- Lee Harris - politician
- Sergio Kerusch – professional basketball player
- K. Michelle – singer, actress
- Wendy Moten – singer
- Elise Neal – actress
- Johnny Neumann – basketball player and coach
- Kevin Paige – singer
- Josey Scott – lead singer of Saliva
- Derrick Townsel – former gridiron football wide receiver
