= Oliver Kostić =

Serbian basketball coach

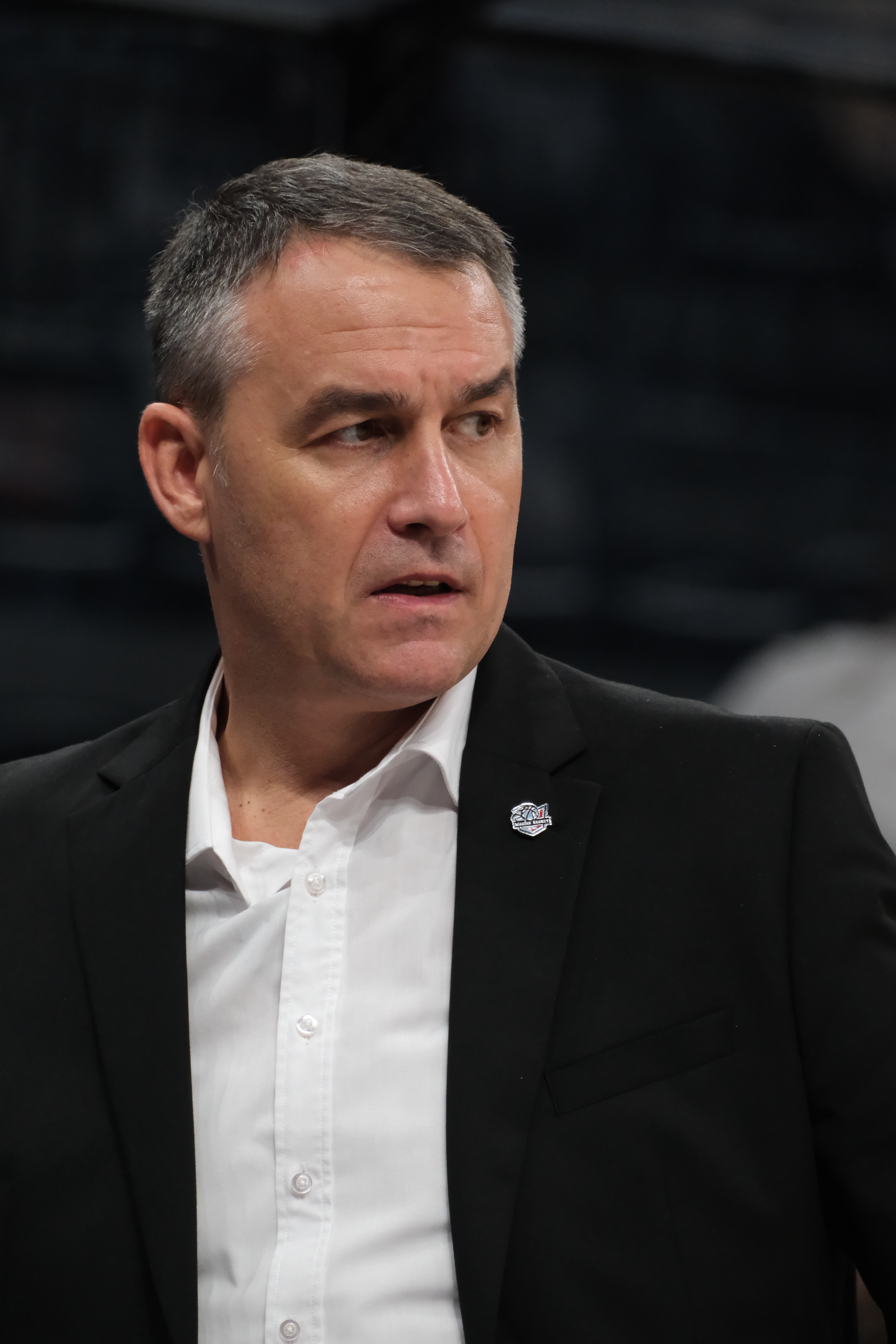

Ningbo Rockets
- Title: Head coach
- League: CBA

Personal information
- Born: 20 February 1973 (age 53) Pirot, SR Serbia, SFR Yugoslavia
- Listed height: 1.90 m (6 ft 3 in)
- Listed weight: 93 kg (205 lb)

Career information
- NBA draft: 1995: undrafted
- Playing career: 1991–1996
- Position: Guard
- Coaching career: 1997–present

Career history

Coaching
- 1997–2001: Alfa Niš
- 2001–2002: Pirot
- 2003–2004: Mitteldeutscher (assistant)
- 2004–2005: Braunschweig (assistant)
- 2005–2006: Lottomatica Roma (assistant)
- 2007–2008: Dynamo Moscow (assistant)
- 2008–2010: Crvena zvezda (assistant)
- 2010–2013: Žalgiris (assistant)
- 2011: Baltai Kaunas
- 2013–2014: Academic Sofia
- 2014–2018: Bayern Munich II
- 2018–2020: Bayern Munich (assistant)
- 2020: Bayern Munich
- 2021–present: Serbia (assistant)
- 2022–2023: Spartak Subotica
- 2023–2024: Juventus Utena
- 2025: Manisa Basket
- 2026–present: Ningbo Rockets

Career highlights
- As head coach: Lithuanian League Coach Of The Year (2024); As assistant coach: German League champion (2019); NBA G League International Challenge champion (2019); 3× Lithuanian League champion (2011–2013); 2× Lithuanian Cup champion (2011–2012); 2× Baltic League champion (2011–2012); FIBA Europe Cup champion (2004)

Oliver Kostić (Serbian Cyrillic: Оливер Костић; born 20 February 1973) is a Serbian professional basketball coach, who worked as an assistant coach for the Serbia national team.

== Coaching career ==
Between 2005 and 2010, Kostić was an assistant coach for Lottomatica Roma (Italy), Dynamo Moscow (Russia), and Crvena zvezda (Serbia); all under head coach Svetislav Pešić.

In April 2018, when Montenegrin coach Dejan Radonjić took over the Bayern Munich first team, Kostić advanced into his coaching team. On 7 January 2020, Bayern Munich parted ways with Dejan Radonjić and appointed Kostić as the new head coach for the rest of the 2019–20 season.

On 7 June 2023, Kostić was announced as the head coach for Juventus Utena of the Lithuanian Basketball League (LKL). On 4 June 2024, Kostić was named LKL Coach of the Year after leading Juventus to a fourth place finish in the regular season.

On August 4, 2025, he signed with Manisa Basket of the Basketbol Süper Ligi (BSL).

On July 27, 2026, Kostić was named as the head coach of CBA team Ningbo Rockets.

== National team coaching career ==
In November 2021, Kostić was named an assistant coach for the Serbia national team under Svetislav Pešić. He was a staff member at EuroBasket 2022 and the 2023 FIBA World Cup.
