= Vule Avdalović =

Serbian basketball player (born 1981)

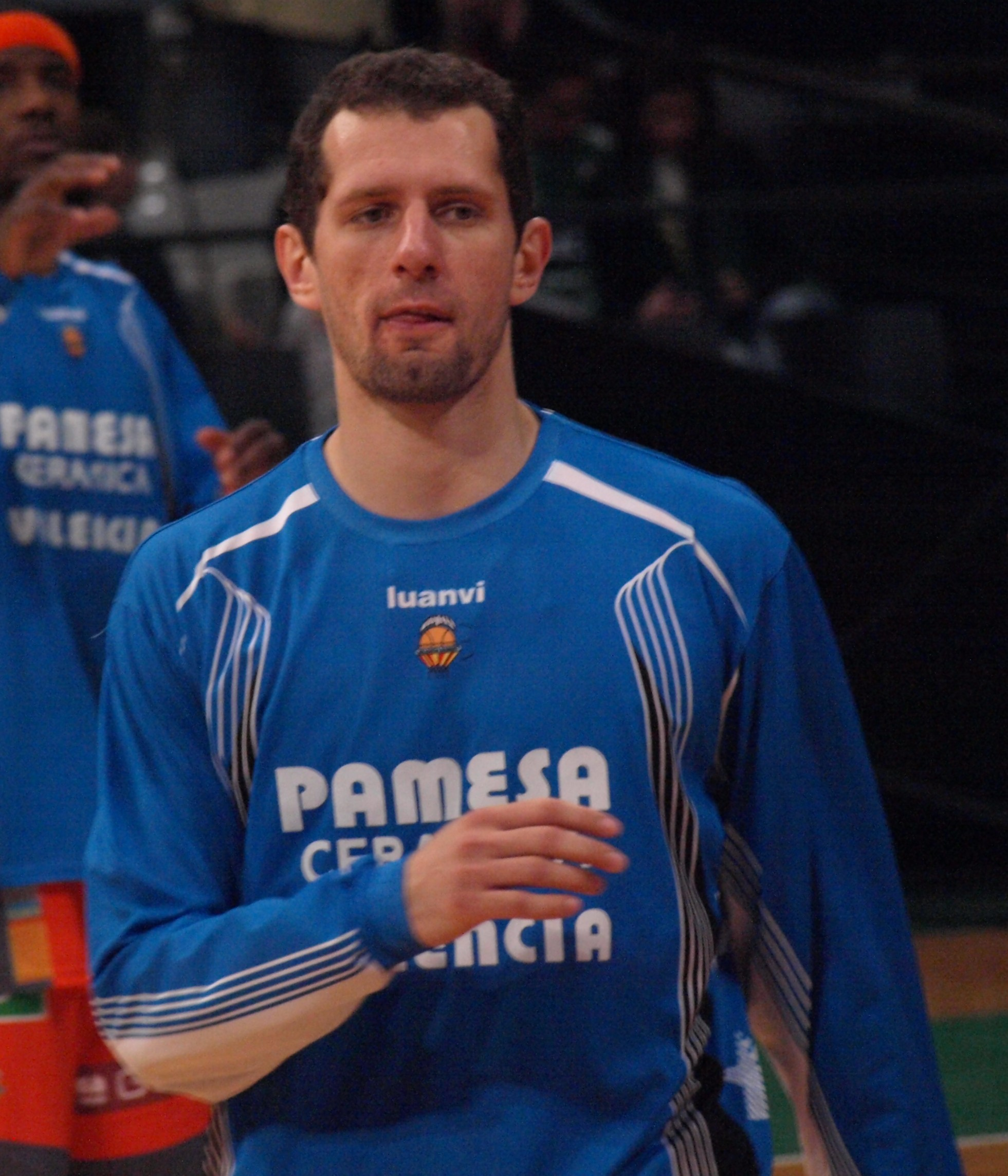
- Avdalović with Pamesa Valencia in 2008

Mega Basket
- Title: Head coach
- League: Serbian League; ABA League

Personal information
- Born: 24 November 1981 (age 44) Gacko, SR Bosnia and Herzegovina, SFR Yugoslavia
- Listed height: 6 ft 1.65 in (1.87 m)
- Listed weight: 185 lb (84 kg)

Career information
- NBA draft: 2003: undrafted
- Playing career: 1998–2013
- Position: Point guard
- Coaching career: 2015–present

Career history

Playing
- 1998–2005: Partizan
- 2005–2009: Pamesa Valencia
- 2009–2010: Lucentum Alicante
- 2010–2011: Cholet
- 2011–2012: Donetsk
- 2012–2013: Alba Berlin

Coaching
- 2015–2016: Partizan (assistant)
- 2017–2022: Mega Basket (assistant)
- 2022–2025: OKK Beograd
- 2025–present: Mega Basket
Medals
Representing FR Yugoslavia
Universiade
Gold medal – first place	2001 Beijing	National Team

Vule Avdalović (Serbian Cyrillic: Вуле Авдаловић; born 24 November 1981) is a Serbian professional basketball coach and former player. He currently works as the head coach for Mega Basket of the Serbian League (KLS) and the ABA League.

== National team career ==
As a member of the FR Yugoslavia youth team, he won the gold medal at the 2001 Summer Universiade in Beijing.

For the Serbia and Montenegro senior team, he played at the 2003 EuroBasket, the 2004 Olympics, 2005 EuroBasket and the 2006 World Championship.

== Head coach ==
On 17 June 2022, OKK Beograd named Avdalović as their new head coach.

== Career statistics ==
Legend
GP	Games played	GS	Games started	MPG	Minutes per game
FG%	Field-goal percentage	3P%	3-point field-goal percentage	FT%	Free-throw percentage
RPG	Rebounds per game	APG	Assists per game	SPG	Steals per game
BPG	Blocks per game	PPG	Points per game	PIR	Performance index rating
**Bold**	Career high

=== Euroleague ===
Year	Team	GP	GS	MPG	FG%	3P%	FT%	RPG	APG	SPG	BPG	PPG	PIR
2001–02	Partizan	**14**	4	14.6	.442	.385	.800	1.0	1.7	.2	.0	4.0	3.0
2002–03	Partizan	**14**	1	7.2	.350	.400	.500	.1	.4	.2	.0	1.5	.2
2003–04	Partizan	**14**	2	23.1	.384	.385	.810	1.4	1.6	.9	**.1**	7.5	5.1
2004–05	Partizan	10	**9**	**33.3**	**.474**	**.462**	.780	**2.7**	**4.1**	**2.1**	**.1**	**13.1**	**17.6**
2010–11	Cholet	10	4	27.7	.338	.250	.806	1.8	3.6	.4	.0	8.5	9.4
2012–13	Alba Berlin	9	6	27.4	.447	.304	**.900**	2.6	3.0	.3	.0	7.4	9.2
Career		71	35	21.0	.410	.366	.792	1.5	2.2	.7	.0	6.5	6.5

== Career achievements and awards ==
As player

- YUBA League champion: 5 (with Partizan: 2001–02, 2002–03, 2003–04, 2004–05)
- Ukrainian SuperLeague champion: 1 (with Donetsk: 2011–12)
- Yugoslav Cup winner: 2 (with Partizan: 1998–99, 2001–02)

Individual Awards

- Won the Three Point competition at the 2010 LNB All-star game
