= Alex King (basketball) =

German basketball player (born 1985)

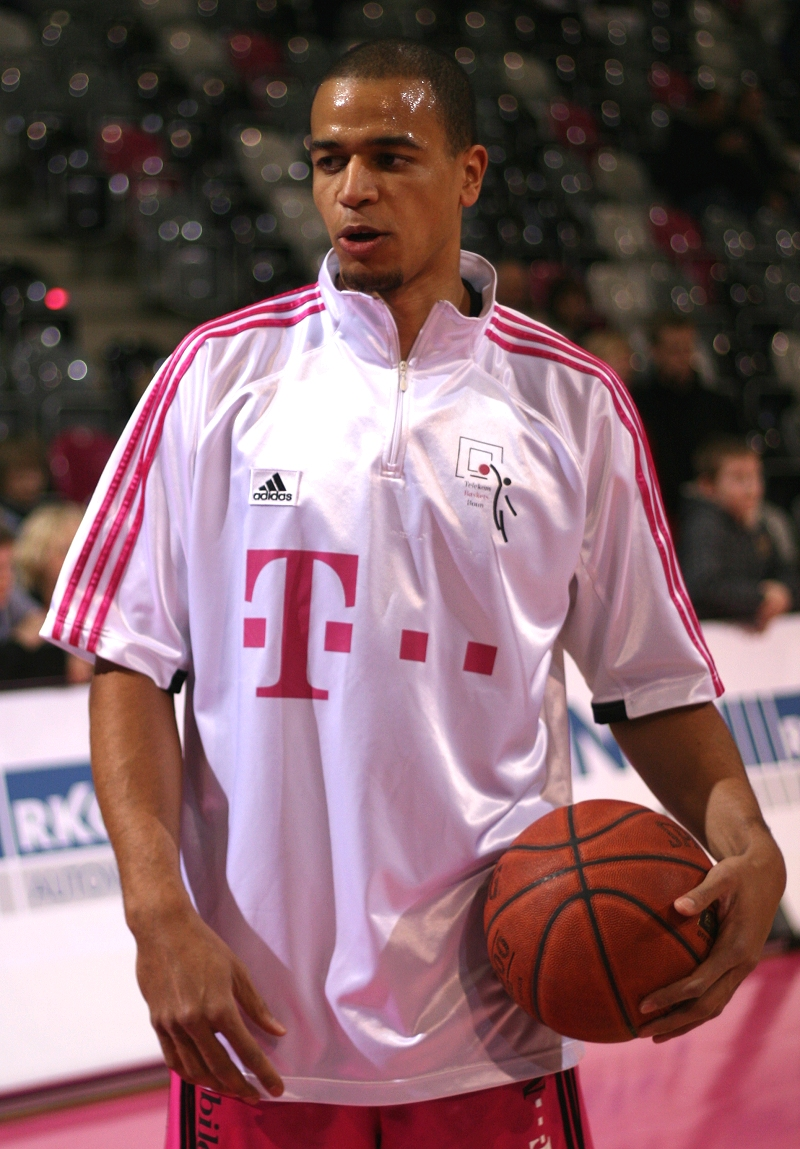
- King with Telekom Baskets Bonn

Personal information
- Born: February 20, 1985 (age 40) Ansbach, West Germany
- Listed height: 6 ft 7 in (2.01 m)
- Listed weight: 220 lb (100 kg)

Career information
- NBA draft: 2007: undrafted
- Playing career: 2002–2022
- Position: Small forward / power forward
- Number: 7

Career history
- 2002–2008: Skyliners Frankfurt
- 2004–2005: →MTV Kronberg
- 2005–2006: →TV Langen
- 2008–2011: Telekom Baskets Bonn
- 2011–2013: s.Oliver Baskets
- 2013–2016: Alba Berlin
- 2016–2020: Bayern Munich
- 2020–2022: →s.Oliver Würzburg

Career highlights
- BBL champion (2004); 2× German Cup winner (2014, 2016); 2× BBL All-Star (2013, 2016)

Alex King (born February 20, 1985) is a German former professional basketball player. He is the all-time leader of games played in the Basketball Bundesliga, with 638 appearances.

== Professional career ==
On July 8, 2013, he signed a three-year contract with German team Alba Berlin.

On August 19, 2016, he signed a contract with Bayern Munich for the 2016–17 season, including a team option for the 2017–18 season.

On December 11, 2020, he has loaned to s.Oliver Würzburg of Basketball Bundesliga (BBL) until the end of the season.

In September 2021, it was confirmed that King would be loaned to s.Oliver Würzburg for another season.

At the end of 2021–22 season, King decided to retire from professional basketball.
