= Sergio Kerusch =

American-German basketball player

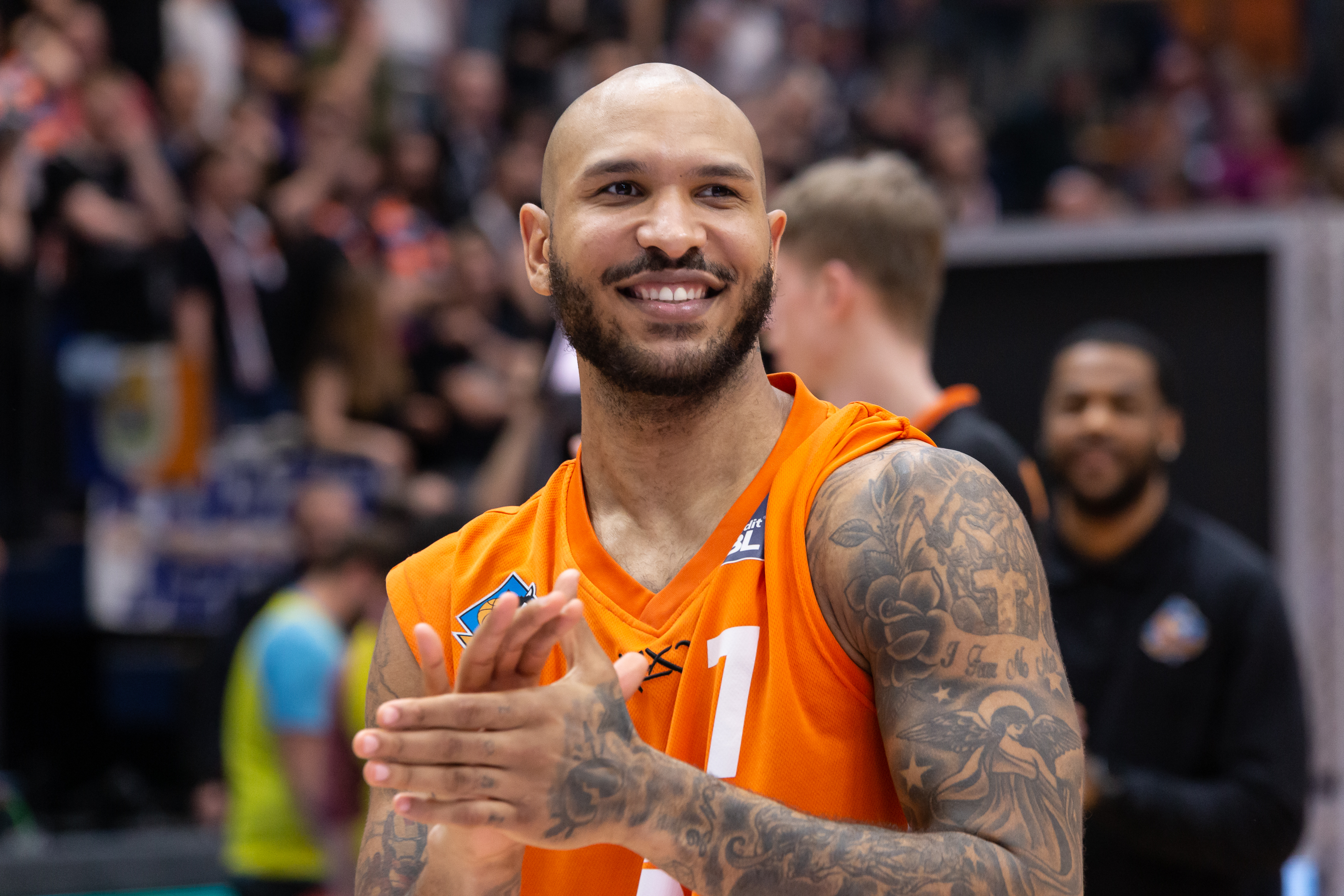
- Kerusch in 2019

No. 7 – Medipolis SC Jena
- Position: Shooting guard / small forward
- League: ProA

Personal information
- Born: January 6, 1989 (age 37) Memphis, Tennessee, U.S.
- Listed height: 6 ft 5 in (1.96 m)
- Listed weight: 225 lb (102 kg)

Career information
- High school: Overton (Memphis, Tennessee)
- College: Itawamba CC (2007–2008); Western Kentucky (2008–2011)
- NBA draft: 2011: undrafted
- Playing career: 2011–present

Career history
- 2011–2012: Aris
- 2012–2015: Artland Dragons
- 2015: Eisbären Bremerhaven
- 2016–2023: Mitteldeutscher BC
- 2023–present: Medipolis SC Jena

Sergio Kerusch (born January 6, 1989) is an American-German professional basketball player who currently plays for Mitteldeutscher BC of the Basketball Bundesliga. He is a 6 ft 5 in (1.96 m) tall shooting guard-small forward. He also holds a German passport due to his German father.

== College career ==
After playing basketball at Overton High School, Kerusch played college basketball at Itawamba Community College (2007–08), and at Western Kentucky University, with the Western Kentucky Hilltoppers, from 2008–11.

== Pro career ==
Kerusch began his professional basketball career after signing a contract with the Greek Championship club Aris Thessaloniki in 2011. In June 2012 he left Aris Thessaloniki and signed with Artland Dragons. On February 20, he signed with Eisbären Bremerhaven of the Basketball Bundesliga.

After playing for Mitteldeutscher BC from 2016–2023, he signed with Medipolis SC Jena of the ProA on February 1, 2023.
