= Michael Clayton (American football) =

American football player (born 1982)

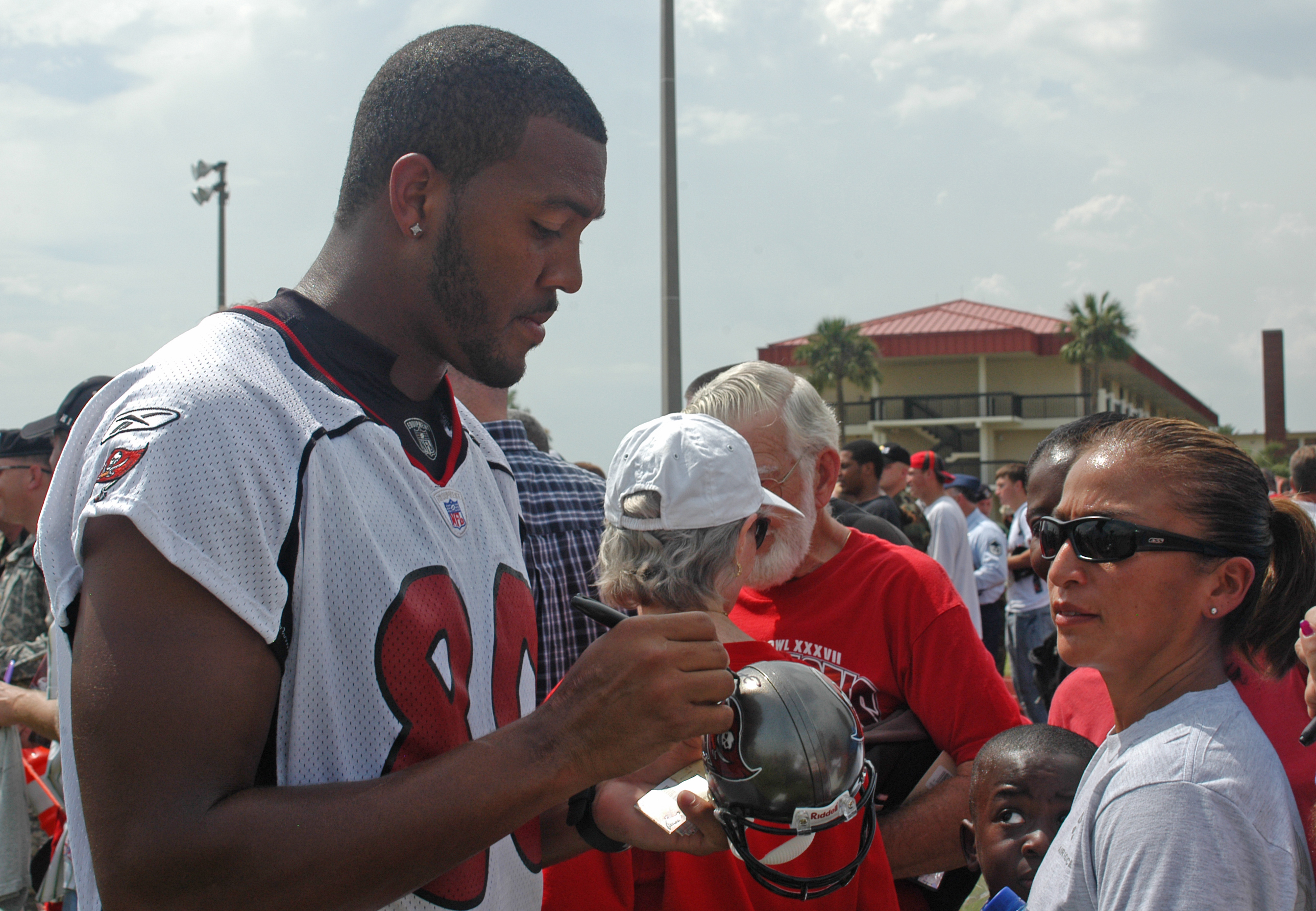
- Clayton signing autographs in 2006

No. 80, 83
- Position: Wide receiver

Personal information
- Born: October 13, 1982 (age 44); Baton Rouge, Louisiana, U.S.
- Listed height: 6 ft 3 in (1.91 m)
- Listed weight: 202 lb (92 kg)

Career information
- High school: Christian Life Academy (Baton Rouge)
- College: LSU (2001–2003)
- NFL draft: 2004: 1st round, 15th overall pick

Career history
- Tampa Bay Buccaneers (2004–2009); Omaha Nighthawks (2010); New York Giants (2010–2011)

Awards and highlights
- Super Bowl champion (XLVI); PFWA All-Rookie Team (2004); BCS national champion (2003); First-team All-SEC (2003); Second-team All-SEC (2002)

Career NFL statistics
- Receptions: 223
- Receiving yards: 2,955
- Receiving touchdowns: 10
- Stats at Pro Football Reference

Michael Rashard Clayton (born October 13, 1982) is an American former professional football player who was a wide receiver in the National Football League (NFL). He played college football for the LSU Tigers and was selected by the Tampa Bay Buccaneers 15th overall in the 2004 NFL draft.

== Early life ==
Clayton prepped at Christian Life Academy in Baton Rouge where he was one of the most sought after recruits in the nation during his senior year. He played in the first ever U.S. Army All-American Bowl on December 30, 2000, alongside fellow LSU teammates Ben Wilkerson, Andrew Whitworth, and Marcus Spears. Michael also played basketball there. In 2008, he became the first inductee in the Christian Life Academy Hall of Fame.

== College career ==
Clayton played college football at Louisiana State University, where he was part of the NCAA champion LSU Tigers in 2003. During his three years with LSU, he caught 182 passes for 2,582 yards and 21 TDs for the Tigers, and ended his LSU career with the record for career TD receptions with 21. The record was later broken by Dwayne Bowe in a game against Tennessee on November 4, 2006. He finished second in school history in receptions with 182, just one shy of tying Wendell Davis's record of 183. He is ranked fourth in career receiving yards with 2,582 and seventh in career 100-yard games, and is the only player in LSU history to have at least 700 yards receiving in three straight seasons.

Clayton is a member of Alpha Phi Alpha fraternity. Clayton was initiated into the Nu Psi chapter of Alpha Phi Alpha in the Spring of 2003.

== Professional career ==
Pre-draft measurables
Height	Weight	Arm length	Hand span	40-yard dash	10-yard split	20-yard split	20-yard shuttle	Three-cone drill	Vertical jump	Broad jump
6 ft 2 3/4 in (1.90 m)	209 lb (95 kg)	32 3/8 in (0.82 m)	9 1/8 in (0.23 m)	4.54 s	1.62 s	2.70 s	4.09 s	6.77 s	32.5 in (0.83 m)	9 ft 8 in (2.95 m)
All values from NFL Combine

=== Tampa Bay Buccaneers ===
Clayton was selected by the Tampa Bay Buccaneers with the 15th selection of the first round of the 2004 NFL draft. After a promising 2004 rookie campaign with Tampa Bay, where he led all NFL rookies and the Buccaneers with 80 receptions for 1193 yards, and his team with 7 touchdowns, Clayton had a relatively disappointing season in 2005. With knee surgery in the offseason that saw him having to play into shape in training camp, he finished with 32 receptions for a total of 372 yards and no touchdowns. He was forced to sit out the final game of the regular season against the New Orleans Saints with a turf toe injury and also sat out the Buccaneers playoff match-up against the Washington Redskins.

The start to the 2006 season showed that Clayton had returned to his healthy past of 2004. Clayton had 3 receptions and 34 yards despite the Buccaneers offensive struggles on September 10 in a 27–0 loss to the Baltimore Ravens. Continuing his return to his 2004 form, he caught 6 passes for 55 yards and a touchdown against the Cincinnati Bengals on October 15, 2006. His touchdown, thrown by Bruce Gradkowski, came with seconds left and gave the Tampa Bay Buccaneers the go ahead lead for their first win of the 2006 season. However, the Buccaneers placed him on injured reserve in December with a sprain he believed was occurring in his MCL of his left knee, ending his season with four games remaining.

He followed that overall performance with a 2007 season that was thought to be a possible make or break season. He caught 22 passes during his 14-game season, 16 of those came in the last four contests and 10 coming in the last two. He also amassed 192 of his 301 yards in those four games.

Clayton got to play in his first post-season contest on January 6, 2008, against the eventual Super Bowl-champion New York Giants. He caught 3 passes for 39 yards.

After the 2008 season, Clayton became a free agent but re-signed with the Buccaneers to a new five-year deal. After signing the deal, he made the famous "check is in the bank" quote. The Bucs released Clayton on September 4, 2010.

=== United Football League ===
Clayton joined the Omaha Nighthawks of the United Football League on October 25, 2010.

=== New York Giants ===
On November 23, 2010, Clayton signed a one-year contract with the New York Giants following injuries to Giants receivers Steve Smith, Hakeem Nicks and Ramses Barden. The move also reunited Clayton with Giants quarterback Eli Manning with whom he shared a dorm during the NFL combine in 2004. On September 3, 2011, Clayton was cut by the Giants.

On September 23, 2011, the Giants re-signed Clayton after placing Domenik Hixon on injured reserve. In the 2011–2012 season, Clayton and the Giants beat the Patriots in the Super Bowl 21–17, earning Clayton his first Super Bowl ring. He became a free agent after the season.

== NFL career statistics ==
Legend
**Bold**	Career high

=== Regular season ===
Year	Team	Games		Receiving					
Year	Team	GP	GS	Tgt	Rec	Yds	Avg	Lng	TD
2004	TB	**16**	**13**	**122**	**80**	**1,193**	**14.9**	**75**	**7**
2005	TB	14	10	55	32	372	11.6	41	0
2006	TB	12	9	65	33	356	10.8	27	1
2007	TB	14	4	40	22	301	13.7	39	0
2008	TB	15	9	61	38	484	12.7	58	1
2009	TB	13	11	48	16	230	14.4	47	1
2010	NYG	6	0	4	2	19	9.5	14	0
2011	NYG	5	0	1	0	0	0.0	0	0
		95	56	396	223	2,955	13.3	75	10

=== Playoffs ===
Year	Team	Games		Receiving					
Year	Team	GP	GS	Tgt	Rec	Yds	Avg	Lng	TD
2007	TB	**1**	0	**5**	**3**	**39**	**13.0**	**15**	0
		1	0	5	3	39	13.0	15	0

== Personal life ==
Clayton runs the Michael Clayton Generation Next Foundation, which is a non-profit organization aiding local charities around Tampa Bay and Baton Rouge; mainly the Ronald McDonald Care Mobile and the Tampa Bay Pediatric Cancer Center. Clayton holds the annual Michael Clayton Celebrity Hoops Jam, a celebrity basketball game, to raise money for the foundation.

Clayton has been a pundit for Sky Sports' NFL coverage in the United Kingdom.

Clayton now attends Florida College in Temple Terrace, Florida and is finishing out his degree there.

His cousin, Noah Cain, played football at Penn State and LSU and signed as an undrafted free agent for the Cincinnati Bengals.
