= Johnathan Stove =

American basketball player (born 1995)

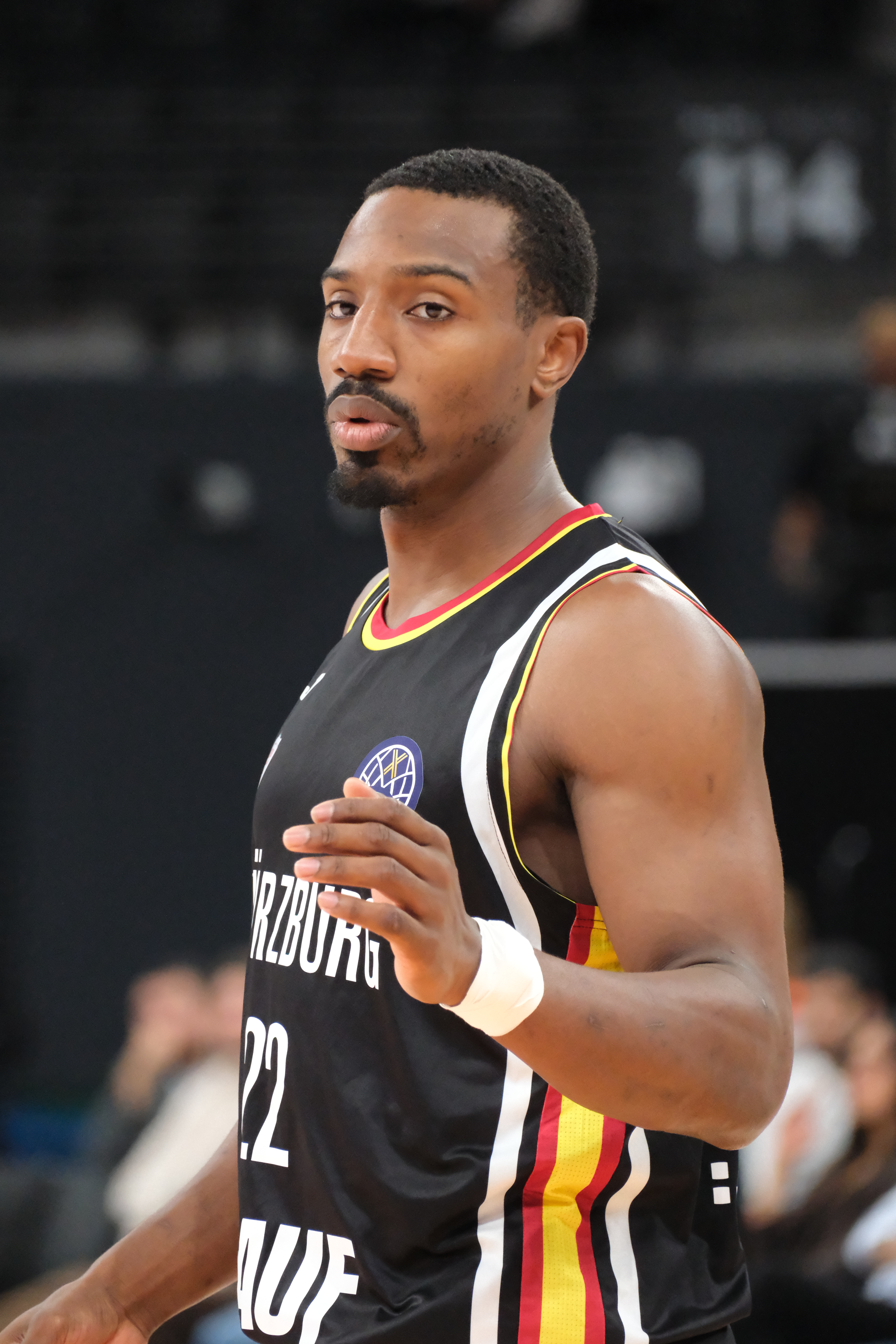
- Stove with Würzburg Baskets in 2025

No. 22 – Rostock Seawolves
- Position: Shooting guard
- League: Basketball Bundesliga

Personal information
- Born: December 23, 1995 (age 30) Baton Rouge, Louisiana, U.S.
- Listed height: 6 ft 4 in (1.93 m)
- Listed weight: 220 lb (100 kg)

Career information
- High school: Christian Life Academy (Baton Rouge, Louisiana)
- College: Louisiana (2014–2018)
- NBA draft: 2018: undrafted
- Playing career: 2021–present

Career history
- 2021: Vllaznia
- 2021–2022: Hapoel Galil Elyon
- 2022–2023: Nokia
- 2023–2024: Mitteldeutscher
- 2024: Maroussi
- 2024–2025: Hamburg Towers
- 2025–2026: Würzburg Baskets
- 2026–present: Rostock Seawolves

Career highlights
- BIBL champion (2022)

Johnathan Stove (born December 23, 1995) is an American professional basketball player for the Rostock Seawolves of the German Basketball Bundesliga (BBL). He plays at the shooting guard position. He played college basketball for the University of Louisiana at Lafayette.

== Early life ==
Stove was born in Baton Rouge, Louisiana, to Sandra and Benjamin Stove. He is 6 feet 4 inches (193 cm), and weighs 220 pounds (100 kg).

== High school ==
Playing for Christian Life Academy ('14) in Baton Rouge as a junior, he averaged 19.8 points. He earned first all-state honors, and was named to both the state Class A team and to the 11-man all-classes team by the Louisiana High School Basketball Coaches Association.

As a senior, he averaged 25.9 points, 10.9 rebounds 3.2 assists, 2.9 steals, and 2.0 blocks per game. He was ranked the No. 3 player in the state by Nola.com, and named Class 1A MVP by the Louisiana Sports Writers Association.

== College ==
In 2014-15 as a freshman for the University of Louisiana at Lafayette ('18) where he majored in business management, playing guard for the Louisiana Ragin' Cajuns he averaged 5.4 points, 2.1 rebounds, and 1.8 assists per game while shooting .496 from the field and .787 from the free throw line.

In 2015-16 he averaged 8.9 points, 3.4 rebounds, and 1.7 assists per game, and shot .447 from the floor and .750 from the free throw line. In 2016-17 as a junior he averaged 9.1 points, 4.1 rebounds, and 1.7 assists per game. He shot .415 from the floor, and .732 (9th in the Sun Belt Conference) from the free throw line.

In 2017-18 as a senior he averaged 10.1 points, 3.0 rebounds, and 1.6 assists per game. He was second among Sun Belt Conference players in free throw percentage (.821), and seventh in two-point field goal percentage (.585).

== Professional career ==
In 2021 he played for KB Vllaznia in the Albanian Basketball Superleague. He averaged 22 points, 10.4 rebounds, and 5.8 assists per game in five games played.

In November 2021 he signed with Hapoel Galil Elyon of the Israeli Basketball Premier League.

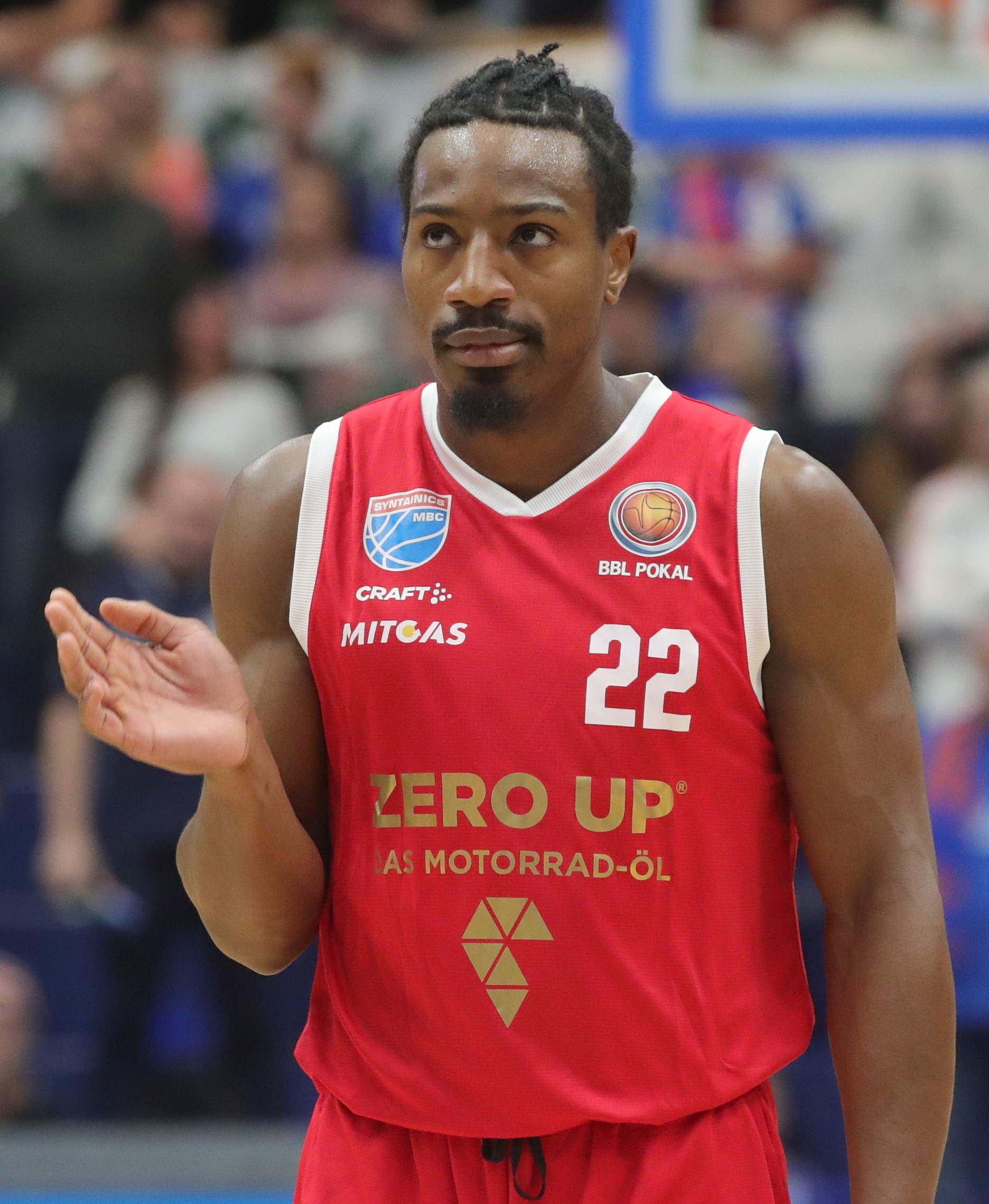
Stove with Mitteldeutscher in 2023

On June 28, 2023, he signed with Mitteldeutscher BC of the Basketball Bundesliga.

On June 9, 2024, Stove joined Maroussi of the Greek Basket League.

On November 20, 2024, he moved to the Hamburg Towers of the Basketball Bundesliga (BBL).

On July 8, 2025, he signed with Würzburg Baskets of the German Basketball Bundesliga (BBL).
