= Louisiana Ragin' Cajuns men's basketball =

American college basketball team

2026–27 Louisiana Ragin' Cajuns men's basketball team
- University: University of Louisiana at Lafayette
- First season: 1911–12; 115 years ago
- Head coach: Quannas White (2nd season)
- Location: Lafayette, Louisiana
- Arena: Cajundome (capacity: 12,362)
- Conference: Sun Belt Conference
- Nickname: Ragin' Cajuns
- Colors: Vermilion and white
Other NCAA Division I tournament results
Sweet Sixteen	1972*, 1973*
Appearances	1972*, 1973*, 1982, 1983, 1992, 1994, 2000, 2004*, 2005*, 2014, 2023

NAIA quarterfinals
- 1967

Appearances
- 1965, 1967

Conference tournament champions
- Southland: 1982; Sun Belt: 1992, 1994, 2000, 2004, 2005, 2014, 2023

Conference regular-season champions
- Gulf States: 1964, 1966, 1967, 1968, 1969; Southland: 1972, 1973, 1977, 1982; Sun Belt: 1992, 2000, 2018

Conference division champions
- Sun Belt West: 2002, 2003, 2004, 2008, 2011

Uniforms
Home	Away
- † at Division II level * vacated by NCAA

The Louisiana Ragin' Cajuns men's basketball program represents intercollegiate men's basketball at the University of Louisiana at Lafayette. The school competes in the Sun Belt Conference in Division I of the National Collegiate Athletic Association (NCAA) and play home games at the Cajundome in Lafayette, Louisiana. Quannas White is the head coach of the team after the firing of Bob Marlin in December 2024. Louisiana has appeared in the NCAA tournament eleven times, most recently in 2023. The Ragin' Cajuns have won the Sun Belt Conference tournament title seven times.

== History ==
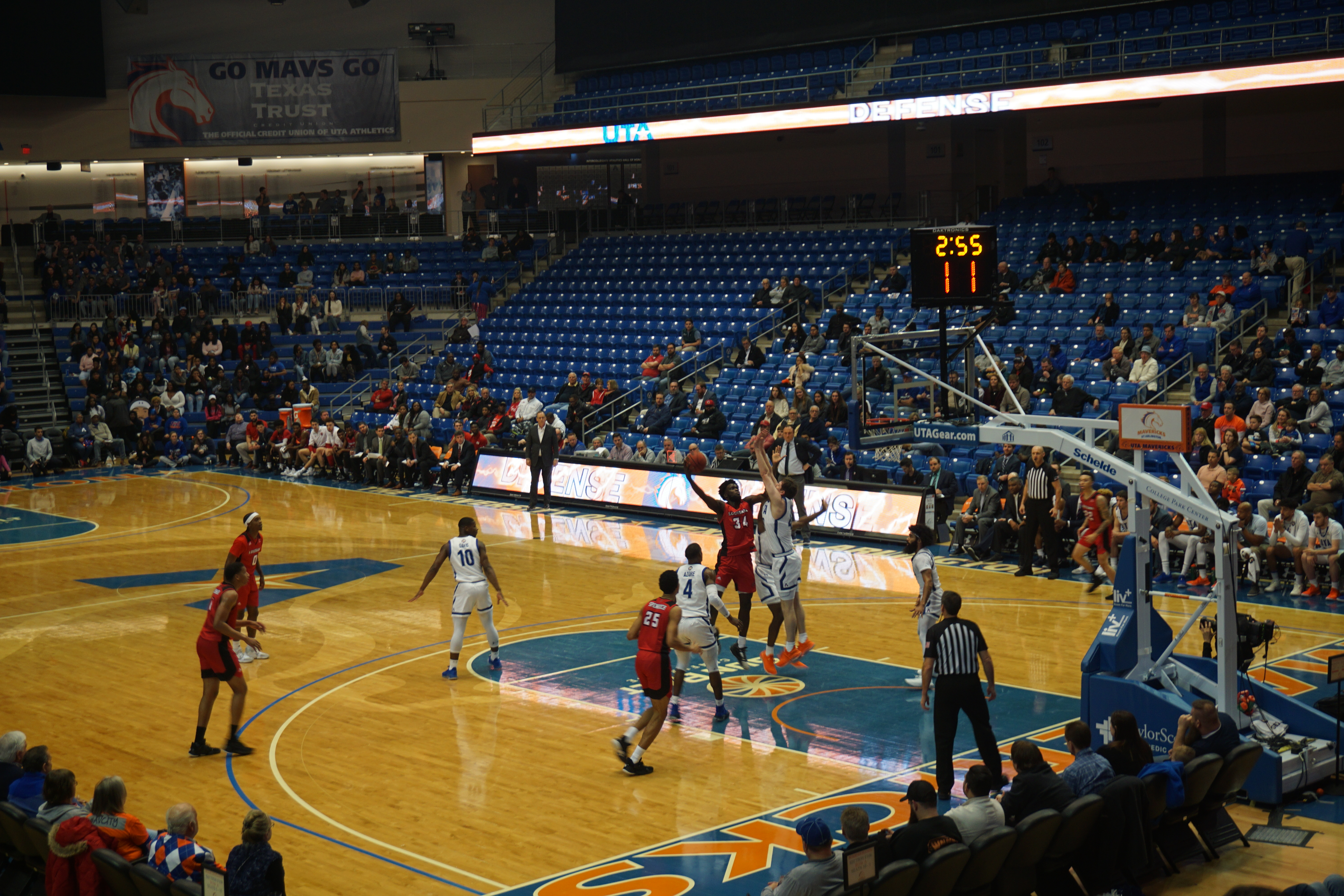
The Ragin' Cajuns in action at UT Arlington in 2020

=== Conference affiliations ===
- 1914–15 to 1924–25: Louisiana Intercollegiate Athletic Association
- 1925–26 to 1940–41: Southern Intercollegiate Athletic Association
- 1941–42 to 1946–47: Louisiana Intercollegiate Conference
- 1947–48 to 1970–71: Gulf States Conference
- 1971–72 to 1972–73; 1975–76 to 1981–82: Southland Conference
- 1982–83 to 1986–87: NCAA Division I Independent
- 1987–88 to 1990–91: American South Conference
- 1991–92 to present: Sun Belt Conference

=== NCAA sanctions ===
==== 1968 infractions ====
In 1968, Southwestern Louisiana was placed on two years' probation and barred from postseason play during that time for recruiting violations and for student-athletes receiving financial assistance from an outside organization.

==== 1973 death penalty ====
In 1973, the NCAA applied the death penalty to the basketball program, barring them from playing for two seasons. This followed an investigation in which the NCAA found that the basketball program had violated rules regarding recruiting, academic eligibility, and amateurism. Among other things, the NCAA discovered that several players had received payment in exchange for playing and that an assistant coach had doctored a high school transcript in order to allow a student athlete who would have otherwise been academically ineligible to play. The NCAA's punishment is considered one of the most extreme in its history and is only one of five times that the death penalty has been applied to a member institution.

==== 2007 major violations ====
In 2007, The Ragin Cajuns were found guilty of major violations in its men's basketball program. An NCAA investigation found that now-former player Orien Greene had relied on 15 hours of correspondence courses taken through another institution in order to remain eligible for the 2004 spring semester and the entire 2004–05 academic year. NCAA rules do not allow student-athletes to use correspondence courses taken from another institution to remain eligible. According to the NCAA, this was an "obvious error" that should have been caught right away, but the school's then-compliance coordinator, director of academic services and registrar all failed to catch it. When school officials learned about the violations, they vacated every game in which Greene participated—43 games in all, including NCAA tournament appearances in 2004 and 2005—and scrubbed Greene's records from the books. The NCAA accepted Louisiana's penalties and also imposed two years' probation.

== Award winners ==
- Lou Henson Award

Jordan Brown – 2023

- Lefty Driesell Award

Elfrid Payton – 2014

== Postseason ==
=== NCAA Division I Tournament results ===
The Ragin Cajuns have unofficially appeared in 10 NCAA Division I Tournaments. However, they have officially only appeared in six; the other four appearances have been vacated. In 1972, they became the first school to make the tournament in their first year of eligibility, advancing to the Sweet Sixteen. They repeated this feat in 1973. However, both of these appearances were vacated as a result of the 1973 infractions case. The Ragin Cajuns participated in the 2004 and 2005 NCAA tournaments, but both appearances were vacated due to major violations involving Orien Greene. Their official combined record is 1–6. All appearances prior to 2000 were when the school was still named Southwestern Louisiana.

Year	Seed	Round	Opponent	Result
1972*	N/A	First round Sweet Sixteen; Regional 3rd-place game	Marshall; Louisville; Texas	W 112–101; L 57–61; W 100–70
1973*	N/A	First round Sweet Sixteen; Regional 3rd-place game	Houston; Kansas State; South Carolina	W 102–89; L 63–66; L 85–90
1982	No. 8	First round	No. 9 Tennessee	L 57–61
1983	No. 8	First round	No. 9 Rutgers	L 53–60
1992	No. 13	First round Second Round	No. 4 Oklahoma; No. 12 New Mexico State	W 87–83; L 73–81
1994	No. 11	First round	No. 6 Marquette	L 59–81
2000	No. 13	First round	No. 4 Tennessee	L 58–63
2004*	No. 14	First round	No. 3 NC State	L 52–61
2005*	No. 13	First round	No. 4 Louisville	L 62–68
2014	No. 14	First round	No. 3 Creighton	L 66–76
2023	No. 13	First round	No. 4 Tennessee	L 55–58

* appearance and records vacated

=== NCAA Division II Tournament results ===
The Ragin Cajuns appeared in the 1971 NCAA Division II Tournament. However, that appearance was later vacated due to the same rules violations that stripped them of their 1972 and 1973 Division I Tournament results.

Year	Round	Opponent	Result
1971*	Regional semifinals Regional Finals; Elite Eight; Final Four; National 3rd-place game	New Orleans; Tennessee State; Assumption; Evansville; Kentucky Wesleyan	W 113–107; W 86–82; W 110–99; L 74–93; W 105–83

* appearance and records vacated

=== NAIA Tournament results ===
The Ragin Cajuns appeared in two NAIA Tournaments. Their combined record is 3–2.

Year	Round	Opponent	Result
1965	First round Second Round	Colorado State-Pueblo; Oklahoma Baptist	W 66–59; L 82–95
1967	First round Second Round; Quarterfinals	Findlay; Central Michigan; Oklahoma Baptist	W 110–73; W 70–62; L 65–66

=== NIT results ===
The Ragin Cajuns appeared in six National Invitation Tournaments. Their combined record is 6–7. All appearances prior to 2002 were when the school was still named Southwestern Louisiana.

Year	Round	Opponent	Result
1980	First round Second Round; Quarterfinals	UAB; Texas; Minnesota	W 74–72; W 77–76; L 73–94
1984	First round Second Round; Quarterfinals; Semifinals; Third-place game	Utah State; Weber State; Santa Clara; Notre Dame; Virginia Tech	W 94–92; W 74–72; W 97–76; L 59–65; L 70–71
1985	First round Second Round	Florida; Tennessee	W 65–64; L 72–73
2002	Opening Round	Louisiana Tech	L 63–83
2003	First round	UAB	L 80–82
2018	First round	LSU	L 76–84

=== CIT results ===
The Ragin Cajuns appeared in three CollegeInsider.com Tournaments (CIT). Their combined record is 4–3.

Year	Round	Opponent	Result
2012	First round	Rice	L 63–68
2015	First round Second Round; Quarterfinals	Incarnate Word; Sam Houston State; Evansville	W 83–68; W 71–70; L 82–89
2016	First round Second Round; Quarterfinals	Texas A&M–Corpus Christi; Furman; UC Irvine	W 96–72; W 80–72; L 66–67

== Notable players ==
- Frank Bartley (born 1994), player for PAOK Thessaloniki BC of the GBL
- JaKeenan Gant (born 1996), player for Hapoel Be'er Sheva of the Israeli Basketball Premier League
- Dwight "Bo" Lamar, former player for San Diego Conquistadors, Indiana Pacers, and Los Angeles Lakers. NCAA Scoring Title in 1972, Two Time All-American (1972, 1973)
- Elfrid Payton, former player of the Phoenix Suns, Lefty Driesell Award winner in 2014
- Johnathan Stove (born 1995), player for Hapoel Galil Elyon of the Israeli Basketball Premier League
- Andrew Toney, former player for the Philadelphia 76ers and two-time NBA All-Star
- Bryce Washington (born 1996), player in the Israeli Basketball Premier League
- Jordan Brown, winner of the 2023 Lou Henson Award.

== See also ==
- List of NCAA Division I men's basketball programs
- 2020–21 Louisiana Ragin' Cajuns women's basketball team
