= Christian Life Academy =

Private school in Baton Rouge, Louisiana, United States

- CLA

Location
- 2037 Quail Dr. Baton Rouge, East Baton Rouge Parish, Louisiana 70808; United States
- Coordinates: 30.3971°N 91.1309°W

Information
- School type: Private
- Motto: Christ, changing lives to change the world!
- Religious affiliation: Christian
- Denomination: nondenominational
- Established: 1981
- Founder: Dr. Jere Melilli
- Closed: 2019
- Grades: Pre-K to 12th
- Enrolment: 0
- Average class size: 0
- Campus type: Suburban
- Colors: Navy Blue and white
- Fight song: Fighting Crusaders
- Athletics conference: 8-2A
- Sports: volleyball, baseball, football, bowling, tennis, softball, soccer, swimming, cheerleading, colorguard, boys basketball, girls basketball, golf, track and field, winterguard
- Mascot: Crusaders
- Nickname: 'Saders
- Accreditation: SACS
- Website: web.archive.org/web/20100105035040/http://gocrusaders.com/

Christian Life Academy, and later The Church Academy, was a private, non-denominational Christian school in Baton Rouge, Louisiana. It was founded as Christian Life Academy in 1981 and closed in 2017. The school reopened in 2018 as The Church Academy, but closed again in 2019. Thousands of students have attended this K-12 academy including people of influence in the business and sports communities.

== History ==
Christian Life Fellowship opened its doors in 1976, and the Academy began in 1981 with grades 7 through 10. The following year grades Kindergarten through 12 were available. Christian Life Academy was a comprehensive school offering a college-preparatory education in a Christian atmosphere. Christian Life Academy provided for grades PS-12, including a nursery and daycare. In July 2016, The Church International took ownership of Christian Life Fellowship and Christian Life Academy.

The campus was located on 55 wooded acres in south Baton Rouge off of Perkins Road. The campus had space devoted to administrative offices, classrooms, libraries, cafeterias, a gymnasium, three athletic fields, field houses, and nursery and daycare facilities. Specialized facilities included art rooms, a choir room, a band room, a theatrical stage, a computer lab, labs for biology, chemistry, and physics, an elementary science lab, locker rooms and weight training rooms.

== Mission ==
The stated mission of Christian Life Academy is to present Jesus Christ as the focus of all truth through excellent academics, wholesome extra-curricular activities and as a foundation for all relationships.

== Fine Arts Department ==
CLA had many venues for those interesting in studying fine arts, including art, choir, theater, and band. Every Spring the Fine Arts Department hosted a "Celebration of the Arts" Festival to showcase the many talents of the students. This venue was also how they raised money to fund the purchase of music and art supplies.

Each year the drama department put on a play in the Fall and a musical in the Spring. One of the most outstanding plays was "Gossip". The musical variety included "West Side Story", "Godspell", Grease, "School House Rock", and High School Musical.

The choir was outstanding and received superior ratings on various occasions. The choir performed at Disney and also traveled to San Antonio receiving superior at all competitions.

The band performed in many different venues throughout the year: marching at the football games, marching in parades and performing in one of their annual concerts. In its competition in Orlando in 2010 the band earned a ranking of "Excellent", while in Dallas in 2011, they earned multiple superior ratings. In Spring of 2015, they scored Superiors in Atlanta, GA.

== Sports ==
CLA was known for its competitive sports programs having been the Louisiana State Basketball Champions in 1996, 2003, 2006, 2007, 2008, 2010 and 2012 in their division. NFL players Michael Clayton and Dillon Farrell attended CLA and graduated from this institution. Basketball player and CLA 2010 graduate Langston Galloway signed with the New York Knicks in 2014 after setting several school records at Saint Joseph's University.

== Notable alumni ==
- Frank Bartley (born 1994), basketball player for Ironi Ness Ziona of the Israeli Basketball Premier League
- Michael Clayton (born October 13, 1982) is a former American football wide receiver who played professionally in the National Football League (NFL). He was drafted by the Tampa Bay Buccaneers 15th overall in the 2004 NFL draft. He played college football at LSU.
- Langston Galloway (born 1991), basketball player for College Park Skyhawks of the NBA G League
- Jacob Kibodi (born 1998), football player for the New Orleans Saints of the National Football League
- Stefan LeFors (born 1981), football coach for Gallaudet and former player at Louisville
- Johnathan Stove (born 1995), basketball player for Hapoel Galil Elyon of the Israeli Basketball Premier League
