= Milan Škobalj =

Serbian basketball player and coach

Petrolul Ploiești
- Position: Head coach
- League: Liga Națională

Personal information
- Born: 9 July 1963 (age 63) Belgrade, SR Serbia, Yugoslavia

Career information
- NBA draft: 1985: undrafted
- Playing career: 1981–1994
- Coaching career: 1994–present

Career history

Coaching
- 1994–1998: FMP Železnik (youth)
- 1998–2001: FMP Železnik (assistant)
- 2001–2008: Crvena zvezda (assistant)
- 2008: Crvena zvezda
- 2008–2009: Kyiv (assistant)
- 2009–2012: Hørsholm 79ers
- 2012–2013: Sport Plazza Casablanca
- 2013–2014: Amal Essaouira
- 2015–2016: Eos Lund
- 2016–2018: FOG Næstved
- 2018–2020: Rostock Seawolves
- 2021–2023: Musel Pikes
- 2024–2025: Rapid București
- 2025–present: Petrolul Ploiești

Career highlights
- As head coach: Danish Basketligaen Coach of the Year 2010; Danish Cup winner (2017); As assistant coach: 2× Serbian Cup winner (2004, 2006)

Milan Škobalj (Serbian Cyrillic: Милан Шкобаљ, born 9 July 1963) is a Serbian professional basketball coach and former player. He is the current head coach of Petrolul Ploiești in the Liga Națională.

== Coaching career ==
Škobalj had worked as an assistant coach in FMP Železnik for three seasons before he became the assistant coach of Crvena zvezda in 2001. In 2008 had a stint as a head coach of Crvena zvezda after Stevan Karadžić resign. In 2008–09 season he was an assistant coach of Kyiv in Ukrainian League.

Škobalj was an assistant coach of Dragan Šakota in the national team of Serbia and Montenegro at the 2006 FIBA World Championship in Japan.

In 2009, Škobalj was hired as the head coach of the Hørsholm 79ers in the Danish league, Basketligaen. He received Basketligaen Coach of the Year honors in the 2009–10 season. From 2012 until 2014, he coached two clubs in the Moroccan League, Sport Plazza in Casablanca and Amal in Essaouira. In 2015, he was hired as the head coach of Eos Herrlag in Lund, Sweden.

On 9 May 2016, he was named the head coach of Team FOG Næstved of the Danish League. In May 2018, he signed for the Rostock Seawolves of the German 2nd-tier league. In January 2020, he was replaced by Dirk Bauermann.

From December 2021 until the end of the 2022-23 campaign, he served as head coach of the Musel Pikes in Luxembourg. In 2024, he was hired by CS Rapid București.

== Personal life ==
His son Filip Škobalj (born 2002) is a basketball player.

== See also ==
- List of KK Crvena zvezda head coaches
