= Jacob Kibodi =

American football player (born 1998)

Profile
- Position: Running back

Personal information
- Born: October 4, 1998 (age 28); Baton Rouge, Louisiana, U.S.
- Listed height: 6 ft 1 in (1.85 m)
- Listed weight: 225 lb (102 kg)

Career information
- High school: Christian Life Academy (Baton Rouge, Louisiana)
- College: Texas A&M (2017–2019); Incarnate Word (2020); Louisiana (2021–2023)
- NFL draft: 2024: undrafted

Career history
- New Orleans Saints (2024)*; Cleveland Browns (2024); Memphis Showboats (2025)
- * Offseason or practice squad member only

Career NFL statistics as of 2024
- Rushing yards: 24
- Rushing average: 4.8
- Receptions: 1
- Receiving yards: 15
- Stats at Pro Football Reference

Jacob Kibodi (born October 4, 1998) is an American professional football running back. He played college football for the Texas A&M Aggies and Louisiana Ragin' Cajuns.

== Early life ==
Kibodi was born on October 4, 1998. Before he was born, doctors had suggested to his mother to get an abortion, stating, according The Advocate, that Kibodi "wasn't growing the proper way and he would be diminutive if she had him." She went against the doctors' advice after being encouraged by Kibodi's father, who "encouraged her and told her that everything would be alright through their faith in God."

One of three children, Kibodi grew up in Baton Rouge, Louisiana. He attended Christian Life Academy, joining the football team mid-season as a high school freshman after having gave up being a member of the school band. As a junior, he totaled 76 carries for 842 yards and 12 touchdowns along with 18 receptions for 324 yards and five touchdowns. He then ran for 1,208 yards and 12 touchdowns as a senior, being an all-region selection. A three-star recruit, he committed to play college football for the Texas A&M Aggies.

== College career ==
Kibodi appeared in five games as a freshman at Texas A&M in 2017, running for 121 yards and a touchdown. He played two games in 2018 and ran for 26 yards. In 2019, he started two games and finished the season with 31 rushes for 123 yards and a touchdown, along with six receptions. He transferred to the Incarnate Word Cardinals for the 2020 season, but did not play as their season was canceled due to the COVID-19 pandemic.

In 2021, Kibodi transferred a second time, joining the Louisiana Ragin' Cajuns. He was a walk-on with Louisiana and saw no playing time in 2021. In 2022, he appeared in nine games and was fifth on the team with 37 rushes for 169 yards. As a senior in 2023, Kibodi ran 129 times for 729 yards and seven touchdowns, also catching nine passes for 79 yards. He ended his collegiate career having run 211 times for 1,168 yards and nine touchdowns, also having caught 19 passes for 132 yards and another touchdown.

== Professional career ==
Pre-draft measurables
| Height | Weight | Arm length | Hand span | 40-yard dash | 10-yard split | 20-yard split | 20-yard shuttle | Three-cone drill | Vertical jump | Broad jump | Bench press |
|---|---|---|---|---|---|---|---|---|---|---|---|
| 6 ft 0 1/2 in (1.84 m) | 218 lb (99 kg) | 31 5/8 in (0.80 m) | 8 3/4 in (0.22 m) | 4.64 s | 1.66 s | 2.66 s | 4.57 s | 7.41 s | 30.5 in (0.77 m) | 10 ft 2 in (3.10 m) | 15 reps |
All values from Pro Day

=== New Orleans Saints ===
After going unselected in the 2024 NFL draft, Kibodi signed with the New Orleans Saints as an undrafted free agent. He was waived on August 27, and re-signed to the practice squad. Kibodi was released by the Saints on December 3.

=== Cleveland Browns ===
On December 18, 2024, the Cleveland Browns signed Kibodi to their practice squad.

=== Memphis Showboats ===
Kibodi signed with the Memphis Showboats of the United Football League on January 27, 2025. He was released on April 28.
