= Dillon Farrell =

American football player (born 1990)

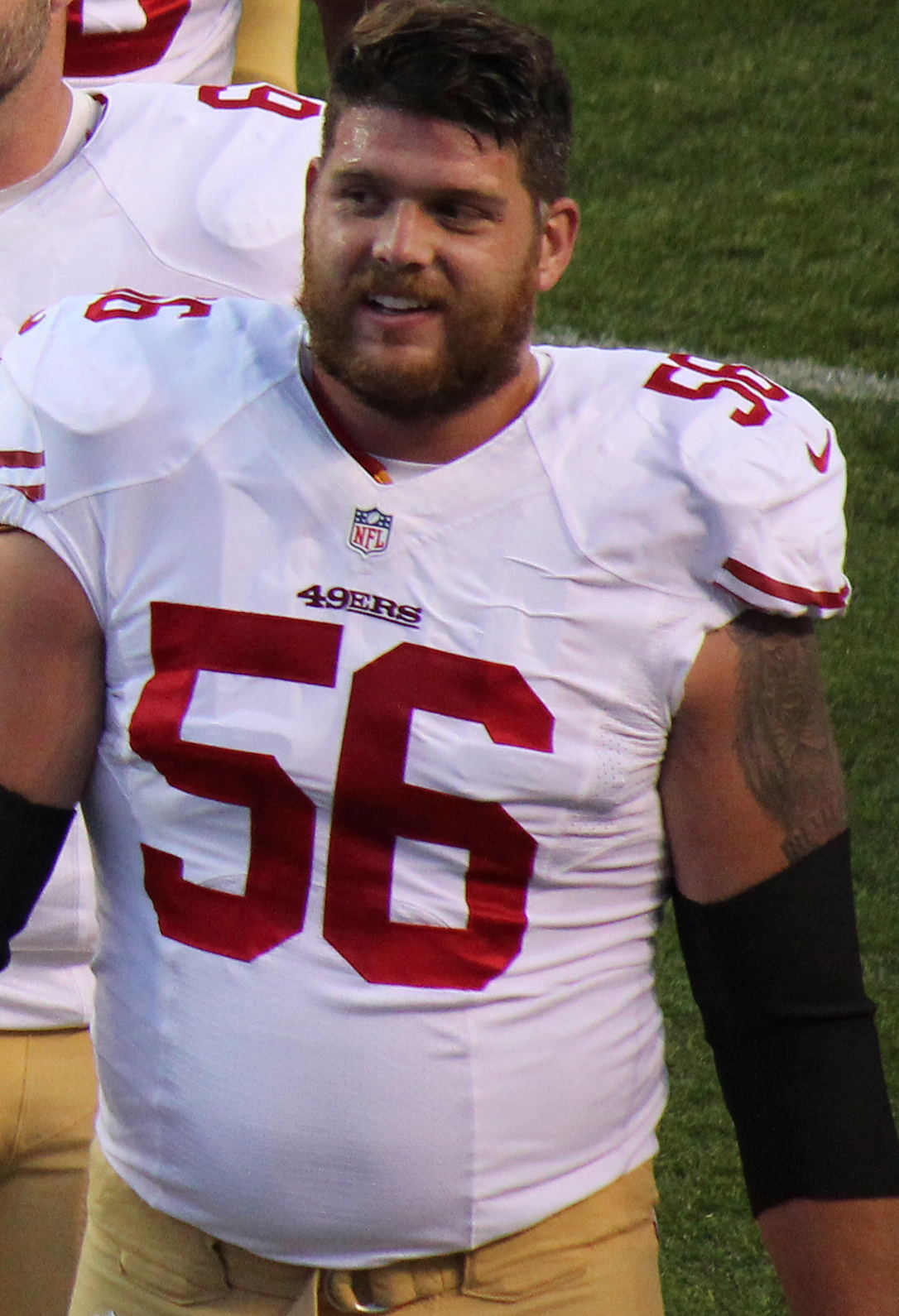
- Farrell with the San Francisco 49ers in 2014

No. 56
- Position: Guard

Personal information
- Born: September 7, 1990 (age 36)
- Listed height: 6 ft 5 in (1.96 m)
- Listed weight: 303 lb (137 kg)

Career information
- High school: Christian Life (Baton Rouge, Louisiana)
- College: New Mexico (2009–2013)
- NFL draft: 2014: undrafted

Career history
- San Francisco 49ers (2014); Tennessee Titans (2015)*; New York Giants (2016)*
- * Offseason or practice squad member only

Career NFL statistics
- Games played: 8
- Stats at Pro Football Reference

Dillon Shane Farrell (born September 7, 1990) is an American former professional football player who was an offensive guard in the National Football League (NFL). He played college football for the New Mexico Lobos. He was a member of the San Francisco 49ers, Tennessee Titans, and New York Giants of the National Football League (NFL).

== Early life ==
Farrell played high school football at Christian Life Academy in Baton Rouge, Louisiana. He was chosen as a first-team all-state offensive lineman after his senior year of 2008. In that same year, the Christian Life Academy football team went on to play in the class 1A LHSAA state championship game, finishing as the state runner up. Farrell also played in the U.S. Army Redstick Bowl. He was a four-year starter and named all-district as a junior.

== College career ==
Farrell played for the Lobos at the University of New Mexico from 2010 to 2013. He was redshirted in 2009.

== Professional career ==
Pre-draft measurables
Height	Weight	40-yard dash	10-yard split	20-yard split	20-yard shuttle	Three-cone drill	Vertical jump	Broad jump	Bench press
6 ft 5 in (1.96 m)	303 lb (137 kg)	5.06 s	1.85 s	2.93 s	4.65 s	7.81 s	30 in (0.76 m)	7 ft 9 in (2.36 m)	26 reps
All values from New Mexico Pro Day

Farrell was signed by the San Francisco 49ers on May 12, 2014, after going undrafted in the 2014 NFL draft. He made his NFL debut on September 21, 2014, against the Arizona Cardinals. He was released by the 49ers on September 5, 2015.

Farrell was signed to the Tennessee Titans' practice squad on September 22, 2015.

Farrell signed a one-year deal with the New York Giants on April 4, 2016. On September 3, 2016, he was released by the Giants.
