= Rostock Seawolves =

Professional basketball team in Rostock, Germany

- Nickname: Seewölfe
- Leagues: Basketball Bundesliga; EuroCup
- Founded: 1994; 32 years ago
- Arena: Stadthalle Rostock
- Capacity: 4,550
- Location: Rostock, Germany
- Team colors: Navy blue, light blue, orange, white
- Head coach: Przemyslaw Frasunkiewicz
- Team captain: Robin Amaize
- 2025–26 position: Bundesliga, 9th of 18
- Website: www.seawolves.de
Home	Away

Rostock Seawolves is a professional basketball club based in Rostock, Germany. The club currently competes in the Basketball Bundesliga, the top division of Germany, and in the EuroCup. The Seawolves play their home games in the Stadthalle Rostock. Within the new states of Germany, Rostock has more active members than any other basketball club, and 3rd most within Germany overall, as of December 2021.

== History ==
The EBC was founded in 1994 by members of the Sportgemeinschaft (SG) Fischkombinat (FiKo) Rostock and the HSG Uni Rostock. For the first time, the team was promoted to the 1st regional league in 2007. Despite a successful start to the season, however, direct relegation could not be avoided. Under coach Dirk Stenke, the Mecklenburg team managed to stay in Germany's highest amateur league for the first time in 2012, finishing fifth. In the summer of 2012, the name EBC Rostock Seawolves was conceived, under which the team played from then on. That same year, Rostock native Sebastian Wild, who had previously spent six years as head coach of the women's team at Lees-McRae College in the U.S. state of North Carolina, took over as coach and led the team around mainstays Sven Hellmann, Kwame Morgan and Jens Hakanowitz to third place in the standings behind Stade and Magdeburg. In 2013, the club's goal was to make the leap to the Basketball Bundesliga in the long term.

The goal for the 2013/14 season was to confirm the third place from the previous year. In the end, the team finished first in the table and was promoted to the 2nd Bundesliga ProB Nord. Among the mainstays of the championship team were, in particular, the US American Keith Radcliff, the Bulgarian Ivo Slavchev, the Frenchman Mahmoud Diakite and Sven Hellmann. One of the highlights of the season was the head-to-head race with promotion rival Itzehoe Eagles. This resulted in a rivalry that developed into a kind of derby due to the regional proximity.

In May 2018, the Seawolves signed Milan Škobalj as their new head coach, who later left the team. In 2020, Dirk Bauermann became head coach.

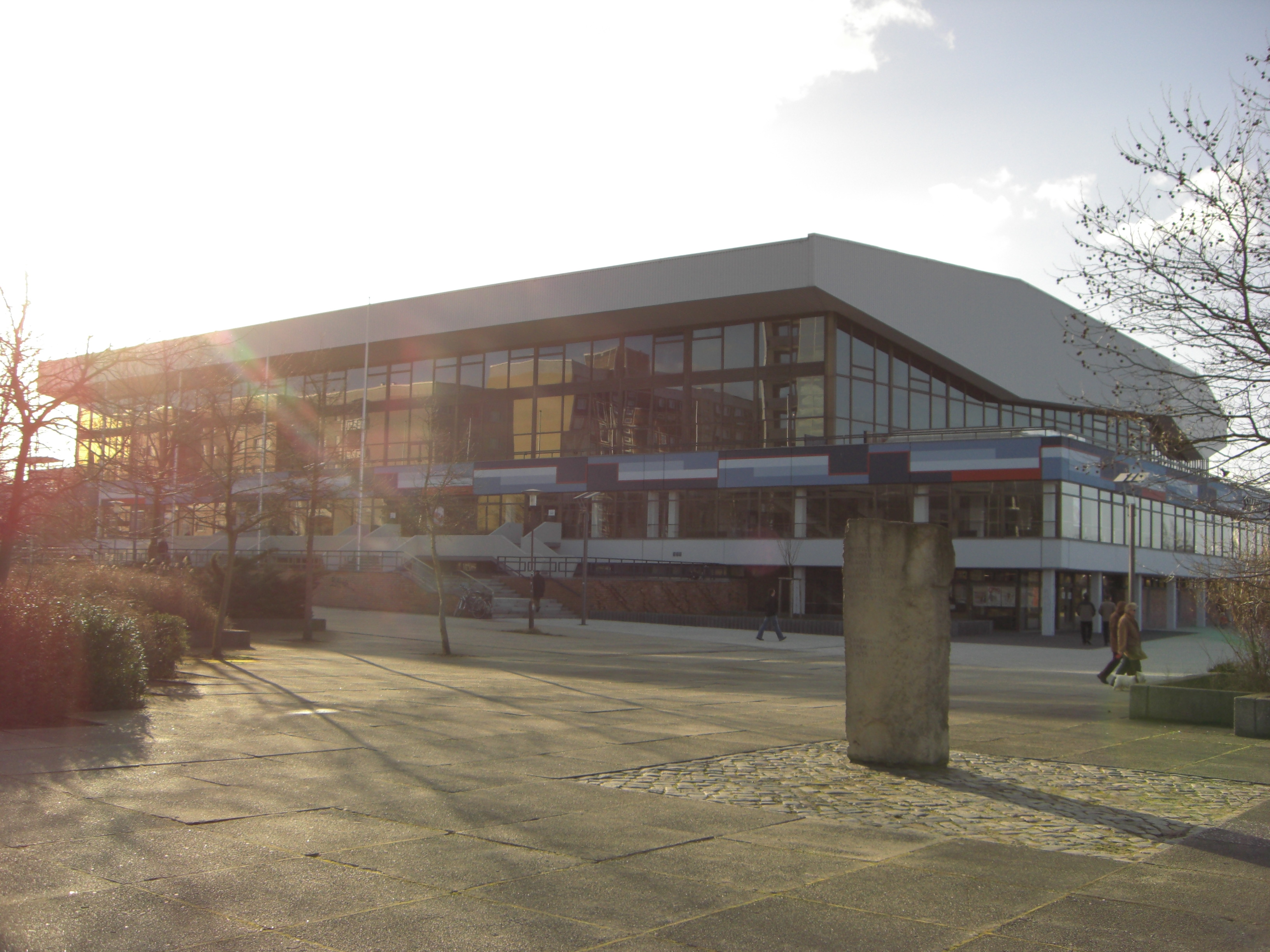
Stadthalle Rostock, home arena of the club

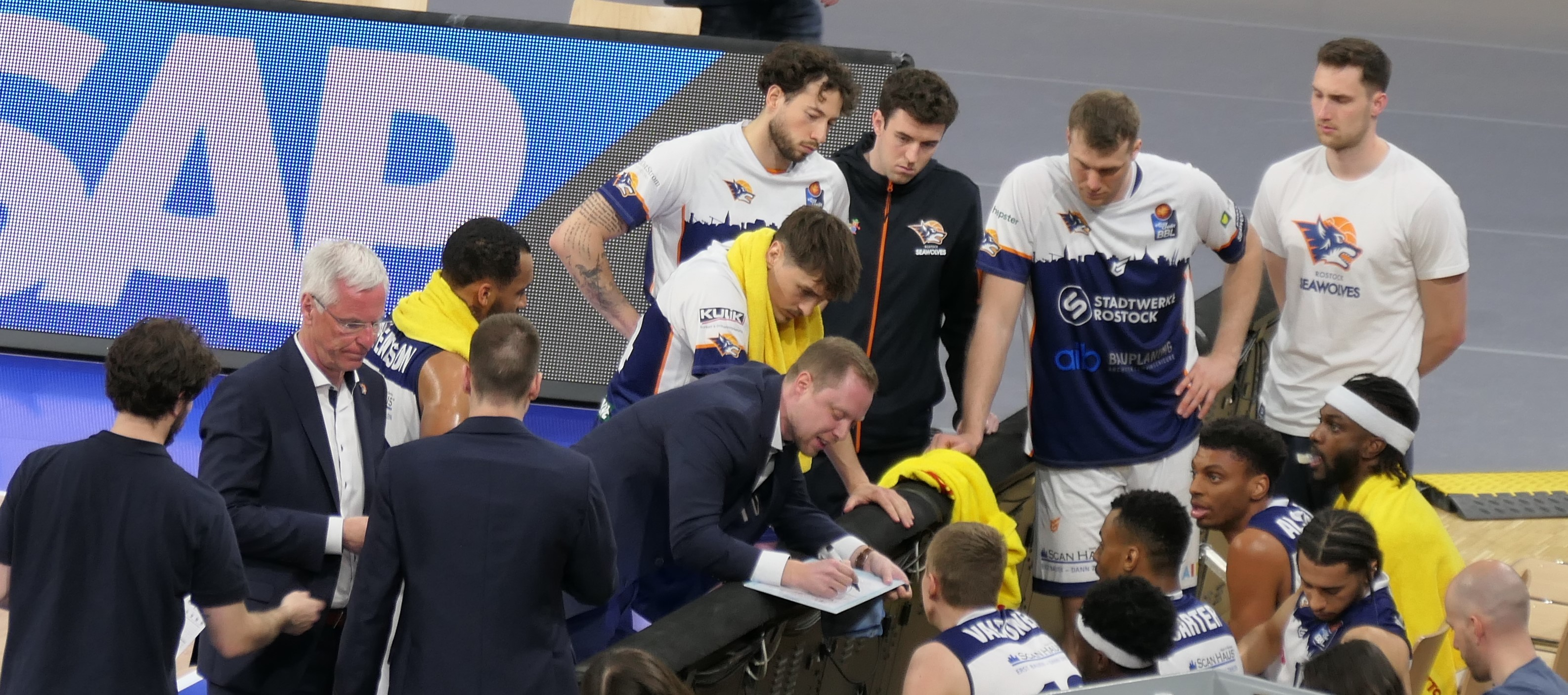
Huddle in April 2023.

== Players ==
=== Current roster ===
Note: Flags indicate national team eligibility at FIBA-sanctioned events. Players may hold other non-FIBA nationalities not displayed.

Rostock Seawolves roster
Players
Coaches

Pos.	No.	Nat.	Name
G	0	(United States)	Crockett, TJ	1.87 m (6 ft 2 in)	27 – 9 September 1999
G	2	(United States)	Copeland, Zach	1.93 m (6 ft 4 in)	29 – 21 June 1997
G/F	3	(Germany)	Lockhart, Dominic	1.99 m (6 ft 6 in)	32 – 3 July 1994
G	4	(Germany)	Baggette, Elias	1.83 m (6 ft 0 in)	24 – 28 April 2002
PG	6	(United States)	Owens, Isayah	1.91 m (6 ft 3 in)	24 – 11 March 2002
C	7	(Germany)	Hartwich, Philipp	2.18 m (7 ft 2 in)	31 – 11 September 1995
G	9	(United States)	Lansdowne, DeAndre	1.88 m (6 ft 2 in)	37 – 6 June 1989
F	15	(Germany)	Amaize, Robin (C)	1.96 m (6 ft 5 in)	32 – 31 January 1994
C	20	(Germany)	Loll, Bruno	2.02 m (6 ft 8 in)	19 – 26 March 2007
SG	22	(United States)	Stove, Johnathan	1.93 m (6 ft 4 in)	30 – 23 December 1995
C	29	(Canada)	Klassen, Owen	2.08 m (6 ft 10 in)	35 – 31 October 1991
SG	31	(Germany)	Tilsen, Matthes	1.96 m (6 ft 5 in)	20 – 14 August 2006
F	33	(United States)	Withers, Todd	2.01 m (6 ft 7 in)	30 – 6 May 1996
SF	34	(Estonia)	Konontšuk, Artur	2.00 m (6 ft 7 in)	26 – 9 May 2000
C	51	(Germany)	Leuchten, Bent	2.14 m (7 ft 0 in)	24 – 6 November 2002

Head coach

- (Poland) Przemyslaw Frasunkiewicz

Assistant coach(es)

- (Poland) Piotr Blechacz
- (Germany) Tom Schmidt

Legend

- (C) Team captain
- Injured

- Roster
Updated: September 1, 2026

=== Depth chart ===
Pos.	Starting 5	Bench 1	Bench 2
C	Owen Klassen	Bent Leuchten	Philipp Hartwich
PF	Todd Withers	Dominic Lockhart	Bruno Loll
SF	Artur Konontšuk	Johnathan Stove
SG	Zach Copeland	DeAndre Lansdowne	Robin Amaize
PG	TJ Crockett	Elias Baggette

== Notable players ==
Note: Flags indicate national team eligibility at FIBA-sanctioned events. Players may hold other non-FIBA nationalities not displayed.

Criteria

To appear in this section a player must have either:

- Set a club record or won an individual award while at the club
- Played at least one official international match for their national team at any time
- Played at least one official NBA match at any time.

- (United States) Derrick Alston Jr.
- (Democratic Republic of the Congo) Yannick Anzuluni
- (Croatia) Dino Butorac
- (United States) Zach Lofton
- (Germany) Till Gloger
- (Finland) Elias Valtonen

== Season by season ==
Season	Tier	League	Pos.	German Cup	European competitions	
2016–17	3	ProB	8th			
2017–18	3	ProB	2nd			
2018–19	2	ProA	5th			
2019–20	2	ProA	12th			
2020–21	2	ProA	3rd			
2021–22	2	ProA	1st			
2022–23	1	Bundesliga	9th			
2023–24	1	Bundesliga	15th	First round	FIBA Europe Cup	RS
2024–25	1	Bundesliga	10th	First round		
2025–26	1	Bundesliga	9th		FIBA Europe Cup	2R
2026–27	1	Bundesliga		First round	EuroCup	
