= Till Gloger =

German basketball player (born 1993)

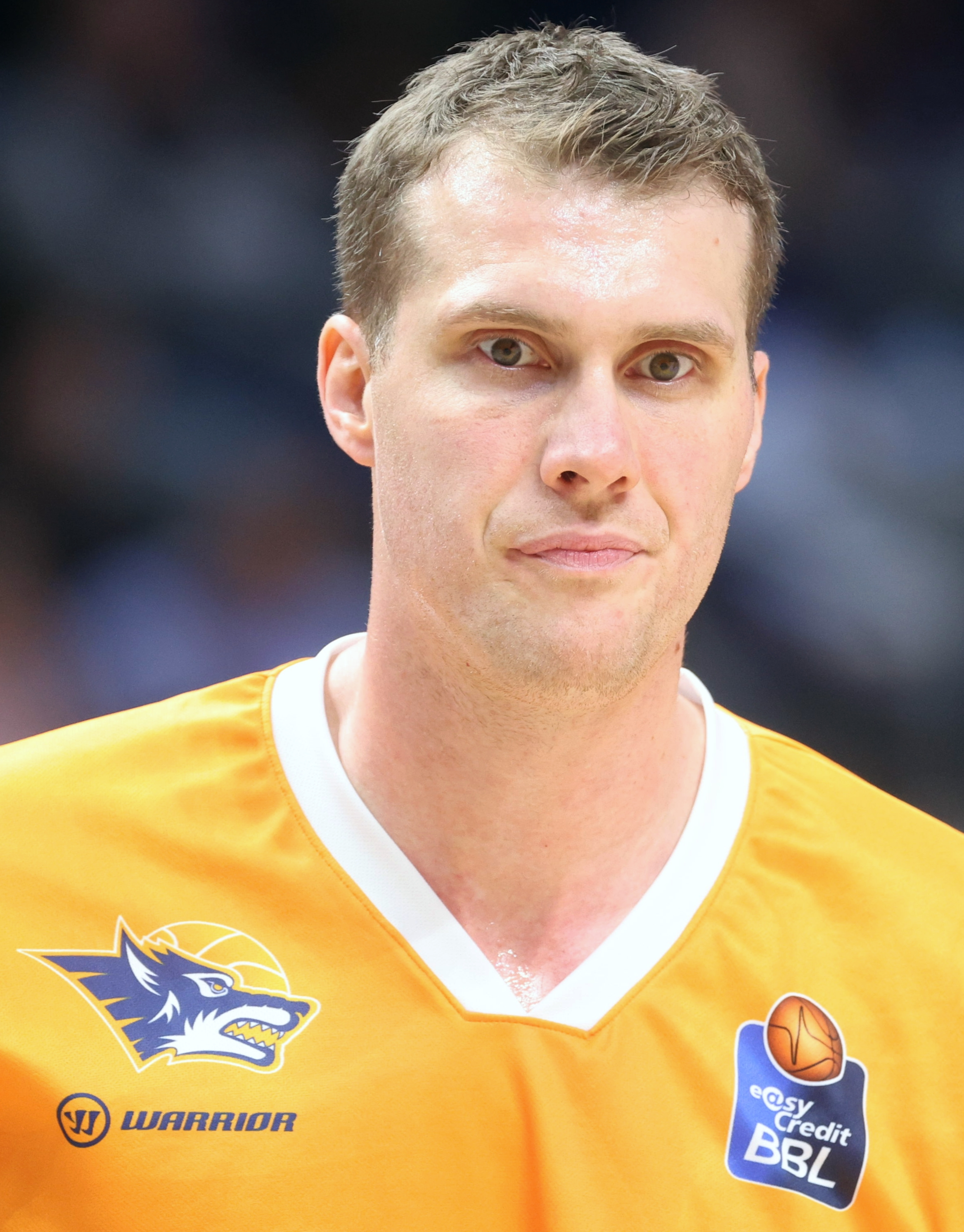
- Gloger with Rostock Seawolves in 2024

No. 18 – Gießen 46ers
- Position: Center
- League: ProA

Personal information
- Born: 26 January 1993 (age 33)
- Listed height: 204 cm (6 ft 8 in)
- Listed weight: 105 kg (231 lb)

Career information
- College: Maine (2012–2016)
- NBA draft: 2016: undrafted
- Playing career: 2016–present

Career history
- 2016–2017: Paderborn Baskets
- 2017–2018: Mitteldeutscher BC
- 2018–2020: Gladiators Treves
- 2020–2025: Rostock Seawolves
- 2025: Franklin Bulls
- 2025–present: Giessen 46ers

Career highlights
- ProA champion (2022)

Till David Gloger (born 26 January 1993) is a German professional basketball player for Giessen 46ers of the ProA. He played college basketball in the United States for the Maine Black Bears before beginning his professional career in Germany in 2016. He has played in both the ProA and Basketball Bundesliga, winning a ProA championship with Rostock Seawolves in 2022.

== Early life ==
Gloger is a native of Bochum, Germany. He grew up playing basketball with his older brothers Florian and Simon.

Gloger played for Metropol Baskets in Germany's youth basketball league, the Nachwuchs Basketball Bundesliga (NBBL), in the 2009–10 season. He moved to Paderborn Baskets in 2010. He played for Paderborn in the NBBL in 2010–11 and 2011–12, where he won the NBBL's Most Valuable Player award for the 2011–12 season after averaging 25.5 points and 13.5 points per game.

== College career ==
Gloger moved to the United States in 2012 to play college basketball for the Maine Black Bears.

As a freshman in 2012–13, Gloger played 29 games and made one start, averaging 2.9 points and 2.3 rebounds in 14.3 minutes per game. He scored a season-high 12 points on 6 December 2012 against the Fisher College Eagles.

As a sophomore in 2013–14, Gloger played 29 games and made eight starts, averaging 7.7 points and 4.0 rebounds in 20.1 minutes per game. He scored a season-high 21 points on 23 February 2014 against Stony Brook.

As a junior in 2014–15, Gloger played 30 games and made 28 starts, averaging 11.5 points and 4.8 rebounds in 26.5 minutes per game. He scored a career-high 23 points on 18 February 2015 against UMass Lowell.

As a senior in 2015–16, Gloger played 29 games and made 11 starts, averaging 8.9 points and 2.7 rebounds in 16.0 minutes per game. He scored a season-high 22 points on 27 January 2016 against Hartford.

Gloger completed his bachelor's degree at the University of Maine and returned to Germany to pursue a master's degree at Paderborn University.

== Professional career ==
Upon returning to Germany, Gloger joined Paderborn Baskets and debuted in the ProA in the 2016–17 season. In 30 games, he averaged 14.5 points and 4.4 rebounds per game.

In May 2017, Gloger signed with Mitteldeutscher BC of the Basketball Bundesliga for the 2017–18 season. In 29 games, he averaged 3.7 points and 1.7 rebounds per game.

In June 2018, Gloger signed a two-year contract with Gladiators Treves of the ProA. He missed the start of the 2018–19 season due to an elbow injury. In 29 games in 2018–19, he averaged 11.8 points and 5.0 rebounds per game. In 27 games in 2019–20, he averaged 15.8 points and 4.5 rebounds per game.

In June 2020, Gloger signed with Rostock Seawolves of the ProA. In 34 games in 2020–21, he averaged 7.8 points and 1.9 rebounds per game. In 2021–22, he helped the team win the ProA and earn promotion to the Basketball Bundesliga. In 38 games, he averaged 11.7 points, 4.3 rebounds and 1.1 assists per game. In the BBL, he averaged 6.0 points and 2.3 rebounds in 33 games in 2022–23, and 4.6 points and 2.3 rebounds in 25 games in 2023–24.

Gloger appeared in just two games for Rostock Seawolves in 2024–25, confined to the bench in coach Przemysław Frasunkiewicz's rotations. Gloger parted ways with the team in February 2025 to pursue overseas opportunities.

On 3 March 2025, Gloger signed with the Franklin Bulls of the New Zealand National Basketball League (NZNBL) for the 2025 season. In 21 games, he averaged 13.8 points, 5.6 rebounds and 1.0 assists per game.

On 7 June 2025, Gloger signed with Giessen 46ers for the 2025–26 ProA season. In 42 games, he averaged 8.7 points and 3.2 rebounds per game. He remained under contract with Giessen 46ers for the 2026–27 season.

== National team ==
Gloger played for the German University National Team at the 2017 World University Games in Taipei. In eight games, he averaged 4.9 points and 3.5 rebounds per game.
