= Frank Bartley IV =

American basketball player

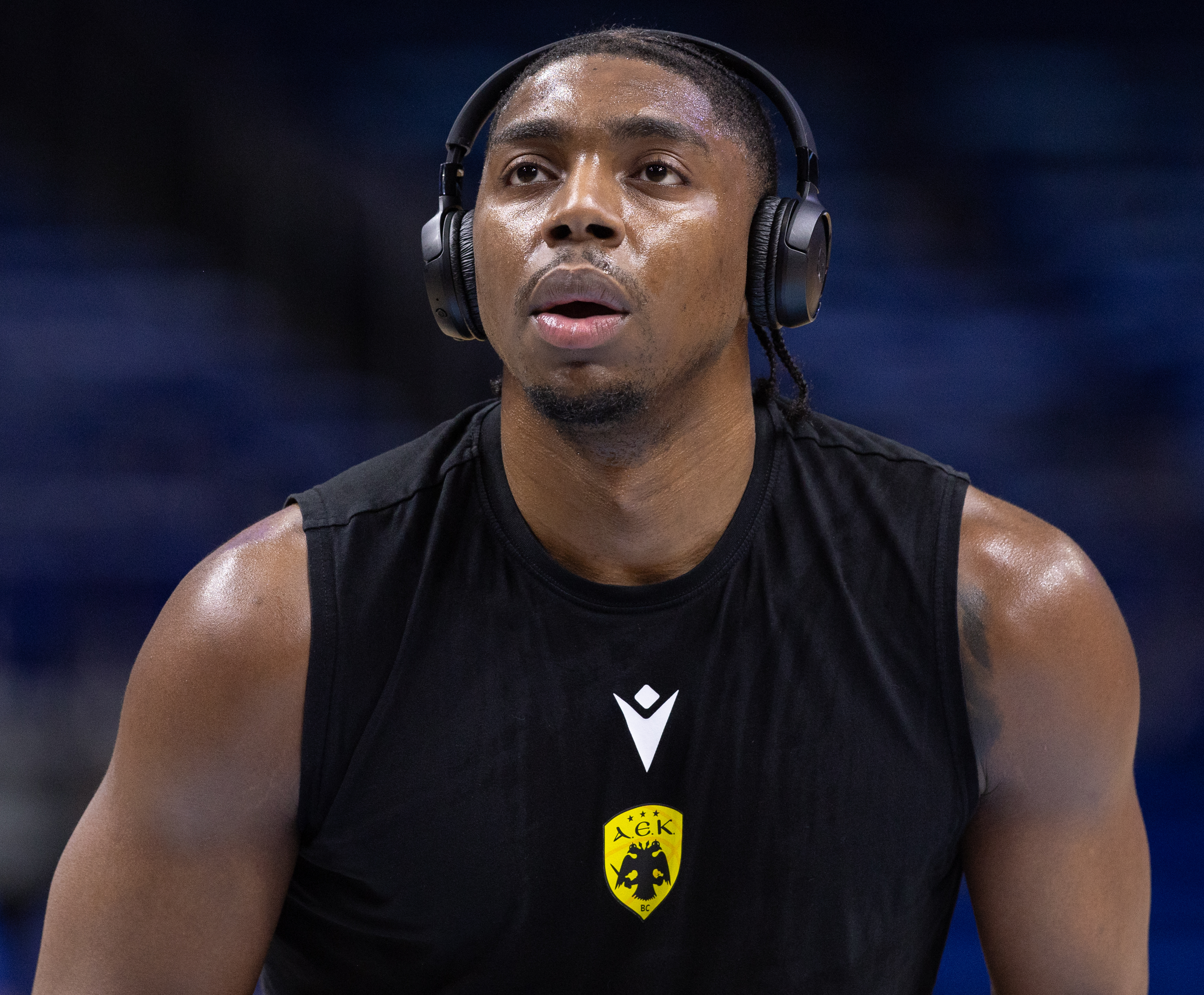
- Bartley in action with AEK Athens in 2026

No. 24 – AEK Athens
- Position: Shooting guard
- League: Greek Basketball League

Personal information
- Born: February 25, 1994 (age 32) Baton Rouge, Louisiana, U.S.
- Listed height: 6 ft 3 in (1.91 m)
- Listed weight: 214 lb (97 kg)

Career information
- High school: Christian Life Academy (Baton Rouge, Louisiana); Future College Prep (Carson, California)
- College: BYU (2013–2015); Louisiana (2016–2018)
- NBA draft: 2018: undrafted
- Playing career: 2018–present

Career history
- 2018–2019: Saint John Riptide
- 2019–2020: CB Ciudad de Valladolid
- 2020–2021: Medi Bayreuth
- 2021: Bakken Bears
- 2021–2022: Ironi Ness Ziona
- 2022–2023: Pallacanestro Trieste
- 2023: Qingdao Eagles
- 2023–2024: New Basket Brindisi
- 2024–2025: PAOK Thessaloniki
- 2025–present: AEK Athens

Career highlights
- FIBA Champions League MVP (2026); All-FIBA Champions League First Team (2026); Greek League Top Scorer (2026); Lega Serie A Top Scorer (2023); LEB Oro Player of the Year (2020); LEB Oro Top Scorer (2020); First team All-NBLC (2019); NBL Canada Rookie of the Year (2019); First team All-Sun Belt (2018); Second team All-Sun Belt (2017); Sun Belt Newcomer of the Year (2017)

Frank Bartley IV (born February 25, 1994) is an American professional basketball player for AEK Athens of the Greek Basketball League. He played college basketball for the BYU Cougars and the Louisiana Ragin' Cajuns.

== Early life ==
Bartley was born and grew up in Baton Rouge, Louisiana, and attended Christian Life Academy, where he played basketball and football. As a senior, he averaged 14.2 points and 6.7 rebounds and was named the District 7-1A co-MVP, All-Metro, and Class 1A All-State by the Louisiana Sports Writers Association. He was also named All-Metro in football as a wide receiver.

After graduating Bartley enrolled at Future College Prep in Carson, California, for a postgraduate year and averaged 19.7 points, 8.0 rebounds, and 6.0 assists per game. He committed to play college basketball at BYU over offers from Auburn and Fordham.

== College career ==
Bartley began his collegiate career at Brigham Young University. He averaged 3.9 points per game in 34 games played as a freshman and 2.5 points per game over 33 games played in his sophomore season. Bartley announced his intent to transfer at the end of the season and ultimately chose to transfer to Louisiana over offers from Hawaii, Nevada, Long Beach State, Oral Roberts, Southeastern Louisiana, Indianapolis and Louisiana Tech.

After sitting out one season due to NCAA transfer rules, Bartley entered the next season as a starter. On November 14, 2016, Bartley scored a career-high 29 points in an 84–83 loss to Montana State. He averaged 15.3 points, 4.3 rebounds, 2.6 assists, and 1.7 steals per game and was named the Sun Belt Conference Newcomer of the Year and second team All-Conference. As a redshirt senior, Bartley was named first team All-Sun Belt after averaging 17.8 points, 3.9 rebounds, 2.0 assists and 1.4 steals per game.

== Professional career ==
=== Saint John Riptide ===
Bartley was signed by the Saint John Riptide on October 29, 2018 of the National Basketball League of Canada (NBLC). Bartley finished eighth in the league with 19.3 points per game and also averaged 5.1 rebounds, 3.2 assists and 1.3 steals and was named first team All-NBLC and the NBLC Rookie of the Year.

=== Valladolid ===
Bartley signed with CB Ciudad de Valladolid of LEB Oro, the Spanish second division, on July 31, 2019. He was named the LEB Oro Player of the Year after averaging a league high 16.3 points per game through 24 games before the season was ended prematurely due to Covid-19.

=== Medi Bayreuth ===
Bartley signed with Medi Bayreuth of the German Basketball Bundesliga (BBL) on July 8, 2020. He averaged 14.3 points, 2.7 rebounds, 2.4 assists and 1.5 steals per game.

=== Bakken Bears ===
On August 20, 2021, Bartley signed with the Bakken Bears of the Basketligaen.

=== Ironi Ness Ziona ===
On September 20, 2021, Bartley signed with Ironi Ness Ziona B.C. of the Israeli Basketball Premier League.

=== Pallacanestro Trieste ===
Bartley signed with Pallacanestro Trieste of the Italian Lega Basket Serie A (LBA) on July 23, 2022. He averaged a league-high 19.5 points per game during the season. After the season, Bartley played in the 2023 NBA Summer League for the New Orleans Pelicans.

=== New Basket Brindisi ===
On December 30, 2023, Bartley signed with New Basket Brindisi of the Lega Basket Serie A.

=== PAOK Thessaloniki ===
On June 21, 2024, Bartley signed with Greek club PAOK Thessaloniki of the GBL.

=== AEK Athens ===
On July 1, 2025, Bartley signed a two-year deal with AEK Athens. In May 2026, Bartley was named the MVP of the 2025-2026 Basketball Champions League. He averaged 18.4 points, 3.6 rebounds and 3.4 assists. He was also named BCL All-Star First Team.
